= 2023 Women's NORCECA Volleyball Championship squads =

This article shows the participating team squads at the 2023 Women's NORCECA Volleyball Championship, held from 29 August to 3 September, 2023 in Quebec City, Canada.

== Canada ==
Head coach: (Canada) Shannon Winzer

No.	Name	Pos.*	Date of birth	Height	Spike	Block
3	Kiera Van Ryk	OH	6 January 1999	188 cm (6 ft 2 in)	302 cm (119 in)	288 cm (113 in)
4	Vicky Savard	OH	14 February 1993	185 cm (6 ft 1 in)	304 cm (120 in)	286 cm (113 in)
5	Julia Murmann	L	10 November 2002	181 cm (5 ft 11 in)	298 cm (117 in)	281 cm (111 in)
6	Jazmine White	MB	14 December 1993	186 cm (6 ft 1 in)	315 cm (124 in)	305 cm (120 in)
7	Layne Van Buskirk	MB	19 February 1998	191 cm (6 ft 3 in)	315 cm (124 in)	305 cm (120 in)
8	Alicia Ogoms	MB	2 April 1994	194 cm (6 ft 4 in)	315 cm (124 in)	305 cm (120 in)
9	Alexa Gray (C)	OH	7 August 1994	185 cm (6 ft 1 in)	323 cm (127 in)	315 cm (124 in)
11	Andrea Mitrovic	OH	3 June 1999	187 cm (6 ft 2 in)	320 cm (126 in)	307 cm (121 in)
13	Brie King	S	24 January 1998	183 cm (6 ft 0 in)	305 cm (120 in)	286 cm (113 in)
14	Hilary Howe	OH	16 June 1998	185 cm (6 ft 1 in)	312 cm (123 in)	295 cm (116 in)
15	Shainah Joseph	OP	15 May 1995	183 cm (6 ft 0 in)	329 cm (130 in)	292 cm (115 in)
17	Kacey Jost	L	15 February 2000	173 cm (5 ft 8 in)	287 cm (113 in)	263 cm (104 in)
19	Emily Maglio	MB	13 November 1996	191 cm (6 ft 3 in)	318 cm (125 in)	302 cm (119 in)
26	Quinn Pelland	S	11 May 1999	179 cm (5 ft 10 in)	299 cm (118 in)	281 cm (111 in)

== Costa Rica ==
Head coach: (Costa Rica) José Miguel Briceño Torres

No.	Name	Pos.*	Date of birth	Height	Spike	Block
2	Nicole Salazar	S	8 May 2003	171 cm (5 ft 7 in)	280 cm (110 in)	260 cm (102 in)
4	Julissa Rodriguez	MB	13 February 2000	185 cm (6 ft 1 in)	286 cm (113 in)	282 cm (111 in)
5	Tamara Espinoza	OH	15 January 2000	170 cm (5 ft 7 in)	276 cm (109 in)	272 cm (107 in)
7	Nicole Mata	OH	15 June 2004	171 cm (5 ft 7 in)	280 cm (110 in)	269 cm (106 in)
9	Ana Victoria Rojas	OP	14 May 2002	176 cm (5 ft 9 in)	288 cm (113 in)	285 cm (112 in)
18	Nhya Morgan	MB	11 September 2006	182 cm (6 ft 0 in)	304 cm (120 in)	275 cm (108 in)
19	Emily Fonseca	L	1 November 2005	164 cm (5 ft 5 in)	285 cm (112 in)	250 cm (98 in)
20	Nazareth Mata	OH	2 October 2006	172 cm (5 ft 8 in)	300 cm (118 in)	272 cm (107 in)
21	Sheyla Alvarez	S	15 July 2006	171 cm (5 ft 7 in)	283 cm (111 in)	262 cm (103 in)
22	Joselyn Moraga	OH	12 January 2006	174 cm (5 ft 9 in)	300 cm (118 in)	272 cm (107 in)
24	Joselyn Hemandez (C)	MB	2 May 1999	176 cm (5 ft 9 in)	282 cm (111 in)	278 cm (109 in)
25	Mariana Porras	MB	15 September 2004	185 cm (6 ft 1 in)	297 cm (117 in)	288 cm (113 in)

== Cuba ==
Head coach: (Cuba) Leivis Garcia

No.	Name	Pos.*	Date of birth	Height	Spike	Block
2	Dezirett Madan	OP	10 December 2002	190 cm (6 ft 3 in)	289 cm (114 in)	275 cm (108 in)
5	Dayana Martinez	MB	19 October 2002	190 cm (6 ft 3 in)	285 cm (112 in)	280 cm (110 in)
7	Odaimis Leliebre	S	16 January 2001	175 cm (5 ft 9 in)	228 cm (90 in)	226 cm (89 in)
8	Diaris Perez	OH	16 November 1998	182 cm (6 ft 0 in)	304 cm (120 in)	295 cm (116 in)
10	Ellemay Miranda	L	7 May 2002	165 cm (5 ft 5 in)	278 cm (109 in)	276 cm (109 in)
11	Gretell Moreno (C)	S	30 January 1998	183 cm (6 ft 0 in)	287 cm (113 in)	280 cm (110 in)
15	Jessica Aguilera	MB	25 May 1999	184 cm (6 ft 0 in)	311 cm (122 in)	302 cm (119 in)
19	Laura Suárez	MB	13 December 1998	185 cm (6 ft 1 in)	304 cm (120 in)	292 cm (115 in)
20	Greisy Fine	OP	21 July 1999	183 cm (6 ft 0 in)	315 cm (124 in)	308 cm (121 in)
24	Thalia Moreno	S	10 April 2002	189 cm (6 ft 2 in)	315 cm (124 in)	308 cm (121 in)
25	Ivy Vila	OH	22 July 2001	181 cm (5 ft 11 in)	235 cm (93 in)	232 cm (91 in)

== Dominican Republic ==
Head coach: (Brazil) Marcos Kwiek

No.	Name	Pos.*	Date of birth	Height	Spike	Block
1	Candida Arias	MB	11 March 1992	194 cm (6 ft 4 in)	320 cm (126 in)	315 cm (124 in)
2	Yaneirys Rodriguez	L	26 June 2000	171 cm (5 ft 7 in)	280 cm (110 in)	251 cm (99 in)
3	Lisvel Eve	MB	10 September 1991	194 cm (6 ft 4 in)	325 cm (128 in)	315 cm (124 in)
4	Vielka Peralta	OH	13 April 1999	186 cm (6 ft 1 in)	310 cm (122 in)	305 cm (120 in)
5	Brenda Castillo	L	5 June 1992	167 cm (5 ft 6 in)	245 cm (96 in)	230 cm (91 in)
7	Niverka Marte (C)	S	19 October 1990	178 cm (5 ft 10 in)	295 cm (116 in)	283 cm (111 in)
11	Geraldine González	MB	18 April 2002	200 cm (6 ft 7 in)	295 cm (116 in)	290 cm (114 in)
12	Yokaty Pérez	S	6 August 1998	178 cm (5 ft 10 in)	291 cm (115 in)	257 cm (101 in)
15	Madeline Guillén	OH	4 June 2001	186 cm (6 ft 1 in)	273 cm (107 in)	242 cm (95 in)
16	Yonkaira Peña	OH	10 May 1993	190 cm (6 ft 3 in)	320 cm (126 in)	310 cm (122 in)
18	Bethania De La Cruz	OH	13 May 1987	188 cm (6 ft 2 in)	330 cm (130 in)	320 cm (126 in)
20	Brayelin Martinez	OH	11 September 1996	201 cm (6 ft 7 in)	330 cm (130 in)	320 cm (126 in)
21	Jineiry Martinez	MB	3 December 1997	192 cm (6 ft 4 in)	305 cm (120 in)	280 cm (110 in)
23	Gaila Gonzalez	OP	25 June 1997	190 cm (6 ft 3 in)	304 cm (120 in)	276 cm (109 in)

== Mexico ==
Head coach: (Italy) Nicola Negro

No.	Name	Pos.*	Date of birth	Height	Spike	Block
1	Ivone Martinez	S	2 March 1997	173 cm (5 ft 8 in)	257 cm (101 in)	234 cm (92 in)
4	María Fernanda Rodríguez	OH	23 June 1997	185 cm (6 ft 1 in)	287 cm (113 in)	280 cm (110 in)
6	Grecia Castro	OH	5 March 2001	180 cm (5 ft 11 in)	255 cm (100 in)	241 cm (95 in)
9	María Celeste Vela	S	19 May 2000	177 cm (5 ft 10 in)	250 cm (98 in)	239 cm (94 in)
11	Jocelyn Urias (C)	MB	16 February 1996	190 cm (6 ft 3 in)	305 cm (120 in)	284 cm (112 in)
12	Joseline Landeros	L	20 December 2000	169 cm (5 ft 7 in)	265 cm (104 in)	249 cm (98 in)
15	Karen Rivera	OP	22 May 1999	174 cm (5 ft 9 in)	265 cm (104 in)	260 cm (102 in)
16	Angela Muñoz	L	10 November 2000	178 cm (5 ft 10 in)	260 cm (102 in)	247 cm (97 in)
20	Aime Topete	OH	16 October 2005	178 cm (5 ft 10 in)	270 cm (106 in)	260 cm (102 in)
22	Andrea Elicerio	MB	22 January 2002	181 cm (5 ft 11 in)	260 cm (102 in)	245 cm (96 in)
30	Arleth Marquez	MB	26 December 2005	194 cm (6 ft 4 in)	270 cm (106 in)	260 cm (102 in)
33	Karina Flores	MB	16 August 1998	194 cm (6 ft 4 in)	299 cm (118 in)	285 cm (112 in)

== Puerto Rico ==
Head coach: (Puerto Rico) Fernando Morales

No.	Name	Pos.*	Date of birth	Height	Spike	Block
1	Andrea Fuentes	S	12 May 1999	185 cm (6 ft 1 in)	256 cm (101 in)	249 cm (98 in)
2	Shara Venegas (C)	L	18 September 1992	172 cm (5 ft 8 in)	280 cm (110 in)	270 cm (106 in)
3	Alondra Vazquez	OH	16 August 2000	185 cm (6 ft 1 in)	267 cm (105 in)	256 cm (101 in)
4	Dariana Hollingsworth	OP	17 June 1999	176 cm (5 ft 9 in)	236 cm (93 in)	231 cm (91 in)
5	Wilmarie Rivera	S	14 February 1997	178 cm (5 ft 10 in)	294 cm (116 in)	288 cm (113 in)
8	Paola Rojas	MB	26 January 1996	182 cm (6 ft 0 in)	300 cm (118 in)	245 cm (96 in)
12	Neira Ortiz	MB	6 July 1993	192 cm (6 ft 4 in)	262 cm (103 in)	256 cm (101 in)
15	Génesis Collazo	OP	4 October 1992	185 cm (6 ft 1 in)	301 cm (119 in)	296 cm (117 in)
16	Paola Santiago	OH	17 February 2000	183 cm (6 ft 0 in)	305 cm (120 in)	282 cm (111 in)
17	Solimar Cestero	OP	8 September 2000	182 cm (6 ft 0 in)	281 cm (111 in)	276 cm (109 in)
18	Alba Hernandez	MB	3 October 1994	207 cm (6 ft 9 in)	305 cm (120 in)	293 cm (115 in)
20	Paula Cerame	OH	23 August 2000	162 cm (5 ft 4 in)	246 cm (97 in)	240 cm (94 in)
21	Pilar Marie Victoria	OH	11 October 1995	182 cm (6 ft 0 in)	301 cm (119 in)	268 cm (106 in)
23	Nomaris Vélez	L	11 June 1993	178 cm (5 ft 10 in)	242 cm (95 in)	238 cm (94 in)

== United States ==
Head coach: (United States) Karch Kiraly

No.	Name	Pos.*	Date of birth	Height	Spike	Block
1	Micha Hancock (C)	S	10 November 1992	180 cm (5 ft 11 in)	305 cm (120 in)	297 cm (117 in)
4	Justine Wong-Orantes	L	6 October 1995	168 cm (5 ft 6 in)	282 cm (111 in)	277 cm (109 in)
5	Alexandra Frantti	OH	3 March 1996	191 cm (6 ft 3 in)	305 cm (120 in)	295 cm (116 in)
6	Morgan Hentz	L	27 July 1998	175 cm (5 ft 9 in)	300 cm (118 in)	279 cm (110 in)
7	Lauren Carlini	S	28 February 1995	185 cm (6 ft 1 in)	302 cm (119 in)	295 cm (116 in)
10	Jordan Larson	OH	16 October 1986	188 cm (6 ft 2 in)	302 cm (119 in)	295 cm (116 in)
11	Andrea Drews	OP	25 December 1993	191 cm (6 ft 3 in)	316 cm (124 in)	312 cm (123 in)
12	Jordan Thompson	OP	5 May 1997	193 cm (6 ft 4 in)	320 cm (126 in)	314 cm (124 in)
15	Haleigh Washington	MB	22 September 1995	190 cm (6 ft 3 in)	307 cm (121 in)	295 cm (116 in)
16	Dana Rettke	MB	21 January 1999	203 cm (6 ft 8 in)	315 cm (124 in)	308 cm (121 in)
22	Kathryn Plummer	OH	16 October 1998	198 cm (6 ft 6 in)	318 cm (125 in)	300 cm (118 in)
23	Kelsey Robinson-Cook	OH	25 June 1992	188 cm (6 ft 2 in)	307 cm (121 in)	298 cm (117 in)
24	Chiaka Ogbogu	MB	15 April 1995	188 cm (6 ft 2 in)	318 cm (125 in)	307 cm (121 in)
27	Avery Skinner	OH	25 April 1999	186 cm (6 ft 1 in)	320 cm (126 in)	302 cm (119 in)
