= Jineiry Martínez =

Dominican Republic volleyball player

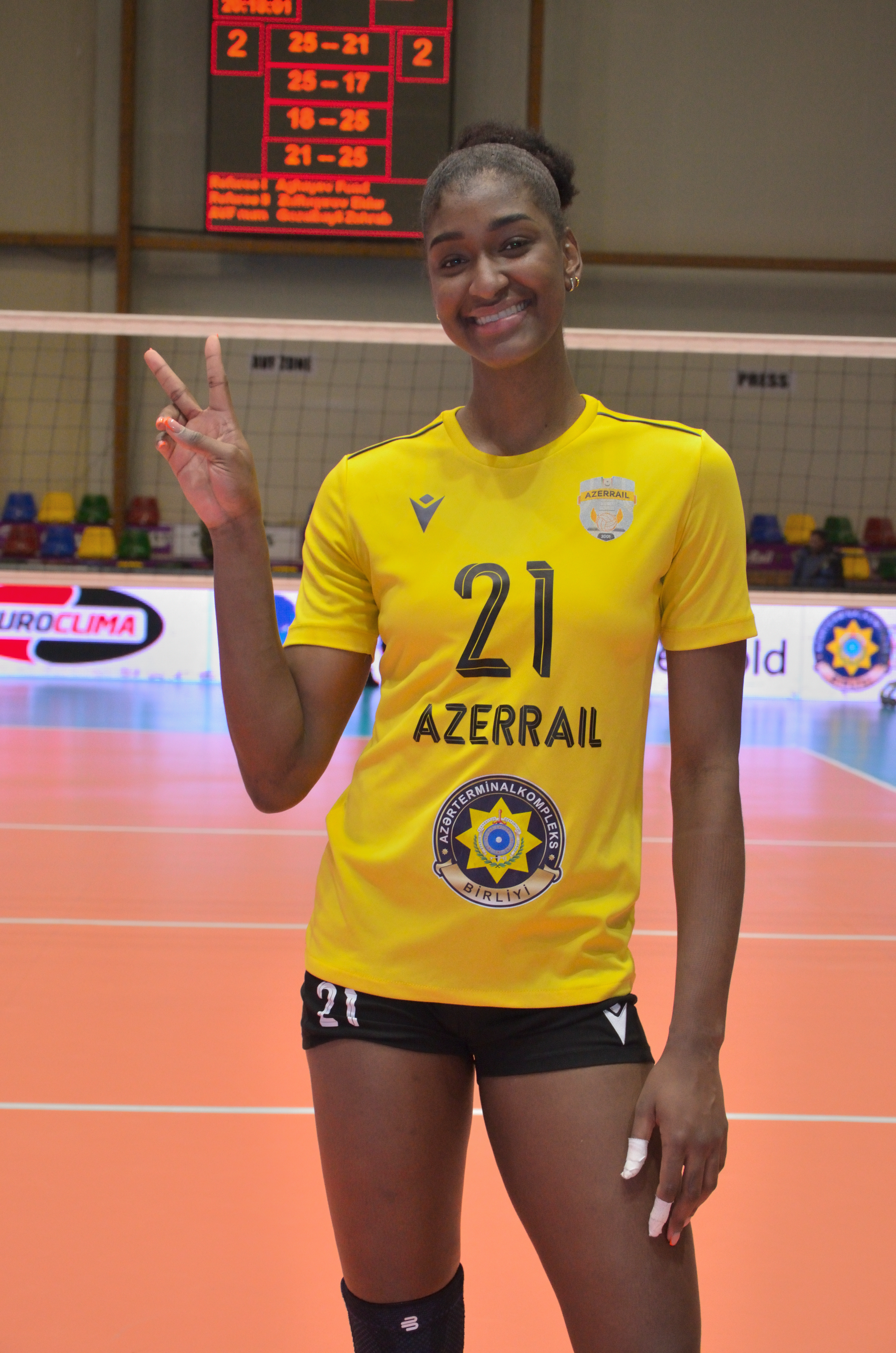
- Martínez in 2024

Personal information
- Full name: Jineiry Martínez
- Nationality: Dominican
- Born: December 3, 1997 (age 28) Santo Domingo, Dominican Republic
- Home town: Santo Domingo
- Height: 1.90 m (6 ft 3 in)
- Weight: 68 kg (150 lb)
- Spike: 305 cm (120 in)
- Block: 280 cm (110 in)

Volleyball information
- Position: Middle blocker

National team
- Years: Team
- 2015–: Dominican Republic
Honours
Women's volleyball
Representing the Dominican Republic
Pan American Games
Gold medal – first place	2019 Lima	Team
Gold medal – first place	2023 Santiago	Team
Bronze medal – third place	2015 Toronto	Team
NORCECA Championship
Gold medal – first place	2019 San Juan	Team
Silver medal – second place	2015 Puerto Rico	Team
Pan-American Cup
Gold medal – first place	2021 Santo Domingo	Team
Gold medal – first place	2016 Santo Domingo	Team
Gold medal – first place	2025 Colima	Team
Silver medal – second place	2015 Lima/Callao	Team
Silver medal – second place	2017 Cañete/Lima	Team
Silver medal – second place	2019 Trujillo and Chiclayo	Team
Central American and Caribbean Games
Gold medal – first place	2023 San Salvador	Team
Gold medal – first place	2026 Santo Domingo	Team
FIVB U23 World Championship
Silver medal – second place	2013 Tijuana	Team
Bronze medal – third place	2015 Ankara	Team
Junior Pan American Cup
Gold medal – first place	2015 Santo Domingo	Team
Bolivarian Games
Gold medal – first place	2017 Santa Marta	Team

Jineiry Martínez (born December 3, 1997, in Santo Domingo) is a Dominican volleyball player who played the 2015 FIVB World Cup with the Dominican Republic national team. She won the bronze medal in the 2015 Pan American Games. With her under ages national teams, she won the gold medal in the 2015 FIVB U20 World Championship, silver in the 2013 FIVB U23 World Championship and bronze in the 2015 FIVB U23 World Championship.

In club competitions, she played the 2015 FIVB Club World Championship with the Dominican club Mirador and the 2015–16 CEV Champions League with the French Rocheville Le Cannet.

== Personal life ==
Martínez is 190 cm (6 ft 3 in) tall 68 kilograms (150 lb), born on December 3, 1997, in Santo Domingo, Distrito Nacional. Her parents are Agripina Martínez, who also served as Dominican Republic youth and junior squads team manager, and Juan Doñe (deceased 2008). Her siblings are Brayelin who also plays for the Dominican Republic national volleyball teams and Brayan, who plays professional basketball with Titanes del Distrito Nacional. She is the cousin of basketball player Jack Michael Martínez and niece of the former national team basketball player and politician Vice-Minister of Sports Soterio Ramírez. She confessed that she never liked basketball, but felt in love with volleyball since childhood. She finds support in her sister Brayelin, who was her inspiration to play volleyball.

== Career ==
=== 2012-2013 ===
Martinez played the 2012 High Performance Championships international junior division winning the silver medal when her team lost to the USA Junior team in the final match, The Dominican Republic Youth National team moved to Tijuana, conquering the 2012 Youth NORCECA Championship silver medal. She won the gold medal at the 2012 Junior NORCECA Championship, qualifying for the 2013 Junior World Championship.

Martinez played in Guatemala where she won with her U-18 squad the 2013 Youth Pan-American Cup bronze medal match 3–1 to Argentina after losing 2–3 to Puerto Rico due to lack of concentration. During the Junior Pan-American Cup held in La Habana, Cuba, Martínez settled the silver medal when her junior team lost 1–3 to Mexico. She then played the FIVB U18 World Championship and ranked eight with her national team. and shortly afterwards played the FIVB U20 World Championship in June, also ranking eight with her national team. She won the silver medal in the 2013 FIVB U23 World Championship winning the silver medal after being defeated by China in the gold medal match.

=== 2014 ===
In March, Martinez joined the Dominican club Playeras from the Boca Chica municipality, joining her sister Brayelin and winning the local tournament after defeating the San Lorenzo de Los Mina club in the final series. They previously easyly defeated Villa Duarte in the semifinals. She later played the NORCECA Junior Championship helping her team to win the bronze medal and later joined the under 23 National Team that won the U23 Pan-American Cup and earning the Best Middle Blocker individual award tied with the Peruvian Andrea Urrutia. After the gold medal, she was among the athletes included in the Dominican Government program that support the new values by the Minister of Sports, Physical Education and Recreation.

=== 2015 ===
Martinez debuted with the Dominican Republic national senior team in Montreux, Switzerland during the Montreux Volley Masters having a team leading 14 points in the classification match for fifth place, including nine blocks. She then played the Junior Pan-American Cup in home soil, winning the gold medal and the qualification for the 2015 FIVB U23 World Championship and was awarded the second Best Middle Blocker of the tournament.

Martinez was chosen to play with the Dominican club Mirador as a wildcard in the FIVB Club World Championship but the team fell 1–3 to Voléro Zürich and 0–3 to Rexona Ades Rio to end their participation in the fifth place. She then played the NORCECA Champions Cup, taking home the gold medal and the qualification for the 2015 FIVB World Cup She then played the 2015 Pan American Games in Toronto, Canada, winning the bronze medal. She took part in the FIVB U23 World Championship finishing with her team the first round undefeated before losing 2–3 to Brazil in the semifinals, she confessed that the team felt sorry about a match they would have won. She ended up winning the bronze medal after coming from behind 3–2 to Japan.

Back with her senior team in the World Cup, and after posting a 5–6 record, they finished in the seventh place from twelve teams.

In September, Martínez signed with the French club Rocheville Le Cannet, then traveled to Puerto Rico to take part in the 2015 U20 World Championship with her junior team who advanced to the semifinals without losing one game as they later won 3–2 over Italy in the semifinals. They then beat Brazil 3–2 to win the gold medal. After the game, Martínez credited the teamwork as the key element for they win.

Martínez senior team lost 1–3 to the United States the NORCECA Championship, ending their participation with the silver medal. Later, she was enrolled in October by the Japan Anti-Doping Agency to be part of the Play True 2020 Torch Relay project, where she was among many athletes aimed to leave real heritage in sport for the world and the future.

=== 2017-2023 ===
With her national team, Martínez won the 2017 Bolivarian Games gold medal. She played with her home country at the Central American and Caribbean Games in El Salvador, taking the gold medal and being named Most Valuable Player and Best Blocker.

=== 2026 ===
Martínez helped her national team to win the gold medal at the 2026 Central American and Caribbean Games, the seventh consecutive for her home country. She was awarded tournament's Best Blocker.

== Clubs ==
- (Dominican Republic) Mirador (2013)
- (Dominican Republic) Boca Chica (2014)
- (Dominican Republic) Mirador (2015)
- (France) Rocheville Le Cannet (2015–2016)
- (Dominican Republic) Guerreras VC (2013)
- (Turkey) Aydın Büyükşehir Belediyespor (2018–2019)
- (Brazil) Praia Clube (2020–2023)
- (Azerbaijan) Azerrail Baku (2023–2024)
- (China) Liaoning (2024–2025)

== Awards ==
=== Individuals ===
- 2014 U23 Pan-American Cup "Best Middle Blocker"
- 2015 Junior Pan-American Cup "Best Middle Blocker"
- 2019 Pan American Games "Best Middle Blockers"
- 2021 Pan-American Cup "Best Middle Blocker"
- 2023 Central American and Caribbean Games "Most Valuable Player"
- 2023 Central American and Caribbean Games "Best Blocker"
- 2023 South American Club Championship "Best Blocker"
- 2023-24 Azerbaijan Super League "Best Blocker"
- 2024-25 Chinese Volleyball Super League "Best Foreign Player"
- 2026 Central American and Caribbean Games "Best Blocker"

=== Clubs ===
- 2014 Santo Domingo Superior Tournament - Champion, with Boca Chica
- 2020–21 Brazilian Superliga – Runner-Up, with Dentil/Praia Clube
- 2021 South American Club Championship – Champion, with Dentil/Praia Clube
- 2021–22 Brazilian Superliga – Runner-Up, with Dentil/Praia Clube
- 2022 South American Club Championship – Runner-Up, with Dentil/Praia Clube
- 2022–23 Brazilian Superliga – Champion, with Dentil/Praia Clube
- 2023 South American Club Championship – Champion, with Dentil/Praia Clube
- 2023-24 Azerbaijan Super League – Champion, with Azerrail Baku
- 2024-25 Chinese Volleyball Super League – Bronze medal, with Liaoning
