= 2015 FIVB Volleyball Women's U20 World Championship =

Tournament details
- Host country: Puerto Rico
- Dates: 11–19 September
- Teams: 16
- Venues: 4 (in 2 host cities)

Final positions
- Champions: Dominican Republic (1st title)

Tournament awards
- MVP: (Dominican Republic) Brayelin Martínez

The 2015 FIVB Volleyball Women's U20 World Championship was the eighteenth edition of the FIVB Volleyball Women's U20 World Championship, which was hosted by Puerto Rico from 11 to 19 September 2015 in the cities of Caguas, Gurabo, Juncos and Maunabo.

Dominican Republic defeated Brazil 3–2 in the final to claim their first title. This marked the first world title for Dominican Republic at any age group. Brayelin Martínez was elected the Most Valuable Player.

== Qualification ==
The FIVB Sports Events Council confirmed a proposal to streamline the number of teams participating in the Age Group World Championships on 14 December 2013.

Method of qualification	Date	Venue	Vacancies	Qualified
Host country	13 May 2015	(Switzerland) Lausanne	1	Puerto Rico
2014 NORCECA Junior Championship	8 – 13 July 2014	Guatemala City	1	Cuba
2014 Asian Junior Championship	16 – 24 July 2014	(Taiwan) Taipei	2	China
2014 Asian Junior Championship	16 – 24 July 2014	(Taiwan) Taipei	2	Japan
2014 South American Junior Championship	29 September – 5 October 2014	(Colombia) Barrancabermeja	2	Brazil
2014 South American Junior Championship	29 September – 5 October 2014	(Colombia) Barrancabermeja	2	Peru
2015 African Junior Championship	27 Feb – 2 Mar 2015	(Egypt) Cairo	1	Egypt
European Qualification Tournament Pool H	14 – 16 May 2015	(Russia) Anapa	1	Russia
European Qualification Tournament Pool G	15 – 17 May 2015	(Serbia) Ruma	1	Serbia
U20 World Ranking	December 2014	(Switzerland) Lausanne	7	Turkey
U20 World Ranking	December 2014	(Switzerland) Lausanne	7	Italy
U20 World Ranking	December 2014	(Switzerland) Lausanne	7	Dominican Republic
U20 World Ranking	December 2014	(Switzerland) Lausanne	7	Bulgaria
U20 World Ranking	December 2014	(Switzerland) Lausanne	7	Chinese Taipei
U20 World Ranking	December 2014	(Switzerland) Lausanne	7	Mexico
U20 World Ranking	December 2014	(Switzerland) Lausanne	7	Czech Republic
Total			16	

- United States withdrew from the tournament.

== Pools composition ==
The drawing of lots was held in Carolina, Puerto Rico on 1 July 2015. Numbers in brackets denote the World ranking as of December 2014.

Pool A	Pool B	Pool C	Pool D
Puerto Rico (Hosts)	China (1)	Japan (2)	Brazil (3)
Russia (7)	Serbia (6)	Italy (5)	Turkey (4)
Bulgaria (10)	Peru (9)	Chinese Taipei (12)	Dominican Republic (8)
Cuba (16)	Mexico (13)	Egypt (24)	Czech Republic (14)

== Venues ==
Pools A, B, D, E, 13th–16th places, 5th–8th places, Semifinals and Finals	Pools A, B, G, 9th–12th places, Seminifinals and Finals	Pools A, D, F and Finals	Pools C, H, 13th–16th places, 9th–12th places and Finals
Maunabo, Puerto Rico	Juncos, Puerto Rico	Gurabo, Puerto Rico	Caguas, Puerto Rico
Maunabo City Coliseum	Rafael G. Amalbert Coliseum	Fernando Hernandez Coliseum	Hector Sola Bezares Coliseum
Capacity: 2,500	Capacity: 3,500	Capacity: 3,500	Capacity: 7,500

== Pool standing procedure ==
1. Number of matches won
2. Match points
3. Sets ratio
4. Points ratio
5. Result of the last match between the tied teams

Match won 3–0 or 3–1: 3 match points for the winner, 0 match points for the loser
Match won 3–2: 2 match points for the winner, 1 match point for the loser

== First round ==
- All times are Atlantic Standard Time (UTC−04:00).

=== Pool A ===
Pos	Team	Pld	W	L	Pts	SW	SL	SR	SPW	SPL	SPR	Qualification
1	Russia	3	3	0	9	9	0	MAX	225	153	1.471	Pool E or Pool F
2	Bulgaria	3	2	1	6	6	5	1.200	250	237	1.055	Pool E or Pool F
3	Cuba	3	1	2	2	4	8	0.500	224	265	0.845	Pool G or Pool H
4	Puerto Rico	3	0	3	1	3	9	0.333	225	269	0.836	Pool G or Pool H

Date	Time		Score		Set 1	Set 2	Set 3	Set 4	Set 5	Total	Report
11 Sep	17:00	Cuba	0–3	Russia	9–25	22–25	17–25			48–75	P2 P3
11 Sep	19:30	Puerto Rico	1–3	Bulgaria	25–23	17–25	19–25	21–25		82–98	P2 P3
12 Sep	17:00	Cuba	1–3	Bulgaria	19–25	26–24	19–25	16–25		80–99	P2 P3
12 Sep	19:30	Puerto Rico	0–3	Russia	14–25	17–25	21–25			52–75	P2 P3
13 Sep	17:00	Russia	3–0	Bulgaria	25–19	25–15	25–19			75–53	P2 P3
13 Sep	19:30	Puerto Rico	2–3	Cuba	14–25	20–25	25–20	25–11	7–15	91–96	P2 P3

=== Pool B ===
Pos	Team	Pld	W	L	Pts	SW	SL	SR	SPW	SPL	SPR	Qualification
1	Peru	3	3	0	9	9	0	MAX	231	194	1.191	Pool E or Pool F
2	Serbia	3	2	1	5	6	5	1.200	237	212	1.118	Pool E or Pool F
3	China	3	1	2	4	5	6	0.833	237	229	1.035	Pool G or Pool H
4	Mexico	3	0	3	0	0	9	0.000	155	225	0.689	Pool G or Pool H

Date	Time		Score		Set 1	Set 2	Set 3	Set 4	Set 5	Total	Report
11 Sep	17:00	China	3–0	Mexico	25–18	25–13	25–23			75–54	P2 P3
11 Sep	19:30	Peru	3–0	Serbia	25–18	25–21	28–26			78–65	P2 P3
12 Sep	17:00	Mexico	0–3	Serbia	19–25	8–25	15–25			42–75	P2 P3
12 Sep	19:30	Peru	3–0	China	26–24	25–21	27–25			78–70	P2 P3
13 Sep	17:00	China	2–3	Serbia	20–25	25–14	25–18	17–25	5–15	92–97	P2 P3
13 Sep	19:30	Mexico	0–3	Peru	14–25	22–25	23–25			59–75	P2 P3

=== Pool C ===
Pos	Team	Pld	W	L	Pts	SW	SL	SR	SPW	SPL	SPR	Qualification
1	Italy	3	3	0	9	9	1	9.000	247	182	1.357	Pool E or Pool F
2	Japan	3	2	1	6	7	3	2.333	230	186	1.237	Pool E or Pool F
3	Chinese Taipei	3	1	2	3	3	7	0.429	213	229	0.930	Pool G or Pool H
4	Egypt	3	0	3	0	1	9	0.111	156	249	0.627	Pool G or Pool H

Date	Time		Score		Set 1	Set 2	Set 3	Set 4	Set 5	Total	Report
11 Sep	17:00	Japan	3–0	Egypt	25–12	25–8	25–10			75–30	P2 P3
11 Sep	19:30	Chinese Taipei	0–3	Italy	22–25	12–25	21–25			55–75	P2 P3
12 Sep	17:00	Italy	3–0	Egypt	25–15	25–15	25–18			75–48	P2 P3
12 Sep	19:30	Japan	3–0	Chinese Taipei	25–18	25–17	26–24			76–59	P2 P3
13 Sep	17:00	Egypt	1–3	Chinese Taipei	26–24	17–25	18–25	17–25		78–99	P2 P3
13 Sep	19:30	Japan	1–3	Italy	25–21	21–25	9–25	24–26		79–97	P2 P3

=== Pool D ===
Pos	Team	Pld	W	L	Pts	SW	SL	SR	SPW	SPL	SPR	Qualification
1	Dominican Republic	3	3	0	9	9	1	9.000	249	196	1.270	Pool E or Pool F
2	Brazil	3	2	1	6	6	3	2.000	213	174	1.224	Pool E or Pool F
3	Turkey	3	1	2	3	3	7	0.429	205	228	0.899	Pool G or Pool H
4	Czech Republic	3	0	3	0	2	9	0.222	203	272	0.746	Pool G or Pool H

Date	Time		Score		Set 1	Set 2	Set 3	Set 4	Set 5	Total	Report
11 Sep	17:00	Brazil	3–0	Czech Republic	25–18	25–11	25–17			75–46	P2 P3
11 Sep	19:30	Dominican Republic	3–0	Turkey	25–20	25–14	25–20			75–54	P2 P3
12 Sep	17:00	Dominican Republic	3–1	Czech Republic	25–20	24–26	25–19	25–14		99–79	P2 P3
12 Sep	19:30	Brazil	3–0	Turkey	25–19	25–17	25–17			75–53	P2 P3
13 Sep	17:00	Turkey	3–1	Czech Republic	25–19	23–25	25–19	25–15		98–78	P2 P3
13 Sep	19:30	Dominican Republic	3–0	Brazil	25–22	25–22	25–19			75–63	P2 P3

== Second round ==
- All times are Atlantic Standard Time (UTC−04:00).

=== Pool E ===
Pos	Team	Pld	W	L	Pts	SW	SL	SR	SPW	SPL	SPR	Qualification
1	Brazil	3	3	0	8	9	4	2.250	309	249	1.241	Semifinals
2	Italy	3	2	1	6	7	4	1.750	250	236	1.059	Semifinals
3	Serbia	3	1	2	3	5	7	0.714	262	275	0.953	5th–8th semifinals
4	Russia	3	0	3	1	3	9	0.333	215	276	0.779	5th–8th semifinals

Date	Time		Score		Set 1	Set 2	Set 3	Set 4	Set 5	Total	Report
15 Sep	17:00	Russia	1–3	Serbia	25–20	18–25	16–25	18–25		77–95	P2 P3
15 Sep	19:30	Italy	1–3	Brazil	11–25	22–25	27–25	20–25		80–100	P2 P3
16 Sep	17:00	Russia	2–3	Brazil	25–19	8–25	25–21	16–25	7–15	81–105	P2 P3
16 Sep	19:30	Italy	3–1	Serbia	19–25	25–21	25–20	25–13		94–79	P2 P3
17 Sep	17:00	Russia	0–3	Italy	18–25	24–26	15–25			57–76	P2 P3
17 Sep	19:30	Brazil	3–1	Serbia	25–14	27–25	27–29	25–20		104–88	P2 P3

=== Pool F ===
Pos	Team	Pld	W	L	Pts	SW	SL	SR	SPW	SPL	SPR	Qualification
1	Dominican Republic	3	3	0	9	9	0	MAX	228	159	1.434	Semifinals
2	Japan	3	2	1	6	6	3	2.000	205	190	1.079	Semifinals
3	Peru	3	1	2	3	3	6	0.500	198	208	0.952	5th–8th semifinals
4	Bulgaria	3	0	3	0	0	9	0.000	154	228	0.675	5th–8th semifinals

Date	Time		Score		Set 1	Set 2	Set 3	Set 4	Set 5	Total	Report
15 Sep	17:00	Dominican Republic	3–0	Japan	25–22	25–15	25–14			75–51	P2 P3
15 Sep	19:30	Peru	3–0	Bulgaria	25–21	25–21	25–12			75–54	P2 P3
16 Sep	17:00	Dominican Republic	3–0	Bulgaria	25–11	25–17	25–18			75–46	P2 P3
16 Sep	19:30	Peru	0–3	Japan	20–25	24–26	17–25			61–76	P2 P3
17 Sep	17:00	Japan	3–0	Bulgaria	25–16	25–12	28–26			78–54	P2 P3
17 Sep	19:30	Peru	0–3	Dominican Republic	14–25	22–25	26–28			62–78	P2 P3

=== Pool G ===
Pos	Team	Pld	W	L	Pts	SW	SL	SR	SPW	SPL	SPR	Qualification
1	Chinese Taipei	3	3	0	8	9	2	4.500	254	202	1.257	9th–12th semifinals
2	Czech Republic	3	2	1	7	8	4	2.000	269	246	1.093	9th–12th semifinals
3	Cuba	3	1	2	2	3	8	0.375	234	267	0.876	13th–16th semifinals
4	Mexico	3	0	3	1	3	9	0.333	238	280	0.850	13th–16th semifinals

Date	Time		Score		Set 1	Set 2	Set 3	Set 4	Set 5	Total	Report
15 Sep	17:00	Chinese Taipei	3–0	Mexico	25–13	25–20	25–16			75–49	P2 P3
15 Sep	19:30	Cuba	0–3	Czech Republic	29–31	13–25	22–25			64–81	P2 P3
16 Sep	17:00	Chinese Taipei	3–2	Czech Republic	25–23	15–25	24–26	25–13	15–9	104–96	P2 P3
16 Sep	19:30	Cuba	3–2	Mexico	20–25	25–23	26–24	27–29	15–10	113–111	P2 P3
17 Sep	17:00	Chinese Taipei	3–0	Cuba	25–19	25–22	25–16			75–57	P2 P3
17 Sep	19:30	Czech Republic	3–1	Mexico	25–18	17–25	25–20	25–15		92–78	P2 P3

=== Pool H ===
Pos	Team	Pld	W	L	Pts	SW	SL	SR	SPW	SPL	SPR	Qualification
1	Turkey	3	3	0	8	9	4	2.250	298	271	1.100	9th–12th semifinals
2	China	3	2	1	6	7	3	2.333	238	198	1.202	9th–12th semifinals
3	Puerto Rico	3	1	2	3	5	8	0.625	261	277	0.942	13th–16th semifinals
4	Egypt	3	0	3	1	3	9	0.333	227	277	0.819	13th–16th semifinals

Date	Time		Score		Set 1	Set 2	Set 3	Set 4	Set 5	Total	Report
15 Sep	17:00	China	3–0	Egypt	25–16	25–16	25–17			75–49	P2 P3
15 Sep	19:30	Turkey	3–2	Puerto Rico	22–25	25–18	23–25	25–18	15–12	110–98	P2 P3
16 Sep	17:00	Turkey	3–1	Egypt	25–16	25–23	18–25	25–21		93–85	P2 P3
16 Sep	19:30	China	3–0	Puerto Rico	25–20	25–20	25–14			75–54	P2 P3
17 Sep	17:00	China	1–3	Turkey	25–16	20–25	20–25	23–25		88–91	P2 P3
17 Sep	19:30	Puerto Rico	3–2	Egypt	25–16	25–10	18–25	23–25	18–16	109–92	P2 P3

== Final round ==
- All times are Atlantic Standard Time (UTC−04:00).

=== Classification 13th–16th ===
13th–16th semifinals
18 Sept
Cuba	3
Egypt	0
18 Sept
Puerto Rico	3
Mexico	1

13th place match
19 Sept
Cuba	3
Puerto Rico	2
15th place match
19 Sept
Egypt	1
Mexico	3

==== 13th–16th semifinals ====
Date	Time		Score		Set 1	Set 2	Set 3	Set 4	Set 5	Total	Report
18 Sep	17:00	Cuba	3–0	Egypt	25–23	25–18	25–17			75–58	P2 P3
18 Sep	17:00	Puerto Rico	3–1	Mexico	25–22	25–16	17–25	25–19		92–82	P2 P3

==== 15th place match ====
Date	Time		Score		Set 1	Set 2	Set 3	Set 4	Set 5	Total	Report
19 Sep	14:00	Egypt	1–3	Mexico	20–25	25–18	21–25	18–25		84–93	P2 P3

==== 13th place match ====
Date	Time		Score		Set 1	Set 2	Set 3	Set 4	Set 5	Total	Report
19 Sep	16:30	Cuba	3–2	Puerto Rico	25–18	22–25	25–23	20–25	15–7	107–98	P2 P3

=== Classification 9th–12th ===
9th–12th semifinals
18 Sept
Chinese Taipei	0
China	3
18 Sept
Turkey	3
Czech Republic	0

9th place match
19 Sept
China	3
Turkey	1
11th place match
19 Sept
Chinese Taipei	3
Czech Republic	1

==== 9th–12th semifinals ====
Date	Time		Score		Set 1	Set 2	Set 3	Set 4	Set 5	Total	Report
18 Sep	17:00	Chinese Taipei	0–3	China	12–25	21–25	11–25			44–75	P2 P3
18 Sep	19:30	Turkey	3–0	Czech Republic	25–9	25–19	25–13			75–41	P2 P3

==== 11th place match ====
Date	Time		Score		Set 1	Set 2	Set 3	Set 4	Set 5	Total	Report
19 Sep	17:30	Chinese Taipei	3–1	Czech Republic	26–24	25–15	22–25	25–19		98–83	P2 P3

==== 9th place match ====
Date	Time		Score		Set 1	Set 2	Set 3	Set 4	Set 5	Total	Report
19 Sep	20:00	China	3–1	Turkey	25–20	17–25	25–19	26–24		93–88	P2 P3

=== Classification 5th–8th ===
5th–8th semifinals
18 Sept
Serbia	3
Bulgaria	0
18 Sept
Peru	3
Russia	1

5th place match
19 Sept
Serbia	3
Peru	1
7th place match
19 Sept
Bulgaria	2
Russia	3

==== 5th–8th semifinals ====
Date	Time		Score		Set 1	Set 2	Set 3	Set 4	Set 5	Total	Report
18 Sep	17:00	Serbia	3–0	Bulgaria	25–23	25–20	29–27			79–70	P2 P3
18 Sep	19:30	Peru	3–1	Russia	12–25	25–21	25–16	25–22		87–84	P2 P3

==== 7th place match ====
Date	Time		Score		Set 1	Set 2	Set 3	Set 4	Set 5	Total	Report
19 Sep	14:00	Bulgaria	2–3	Russia	22–25	25–23	26–24	18–25	9–15	100–112	P2 P3

==== 5th place match ====
Date	Time		Score		Set 1	Set 2	Set 3	Set 4	Set 5	Total	Report
19 Sep	16:30	Serbia	3–1	Peru	18–25	26–24	25–23	25–23		94–95	P2 P3

=== Final four ===
Semifinals
18 Sept
Brazil	3
Japan	0
18 Sept
Dominican Republic	3
Italy	2

Final
19 Sept
Brazil	2
Dominican Republic	3
3rd place match
19 Sept
Japan	0
Italy	3

==== Semifinals ====
Date	Time		Score		Set 1	Set 2	Set 3	Set 4	Set 5	Total	Report
18 Sep	19:30	Dominican Republic	3–2	Italy	25–20	19–25	25–22	24–26	15–7	108–100	P2 P3
18 Sep	20:00	Brazil	3–0	Japan	25–18	25–15	25–21			75–54	P2 P3

==== 3rd place match ====
Date	Time		Score		Set 1	Set 2	Set 3	Set 4	Set 5	Total	Report
19 Sep	17:30	Japan	0–3	Italy	26–28	22–25	19–25			67–78	P2 P3

==== Final ====
Date	Time		Score		Set 1	Set 2	Set 3	Set 4	Set 5	Total	Report
19 Sep	20:00	Brazil	2–3	Dominican Republic	25–17	21–25	17–25	26–24	14–16	103–107	P2 P3

== Final standing ==
Rank	Team
1st place, gold medalist(s)	Dominican Republic
2nd place, silver medalist(s)	Brazil
3rd place, bronze medalist(s)	Italy
4	Japan
5	Serbia
6	Peru
7	Russia
8	Bulgaria
9	China
10	Turkey
11	Chinese Taipei
12	Czech Republic
13	Cuba
14	Puerto Rico
15	Mexico
16	Egypt

2015 Women's U20 World champions

Dominican Republic
1st title

12–woman roster
Jineiry Martínez, Gaila González, Vielka Peralta, María García, Natalia Martínez, Angelica Hinojosa, Ayleen Rivero, Massiel Matos, Yokaty Pérez, Larysmer Martínez, Lisbeth Rosario, Brayelin Martínez (c)
Head coach
Wagner Pacheco

== Awards ==
- Most valuable player
  - Brayelin Martínez (DOM)
- Best setter
  - Misaki Shirai (JPN)
- Best outside spikers
  - Brayelin Martínez (DOM)
  - Bojana Milenković (SRB)
- Best middle blockers
  - Maja Aleksić (SRB)
  - Anna Danesi (ITA)
- Best Opposite
  - Lorenne Teixeira (BRA)
- Best libero
  - Zhana Todorova (BUL)

== See also ==
- 2015 FIVB Volleyball Men's U21 World Championship
