= 2015 Women's Junior Pan-American Volleyball Cup =

Tournament details
- Host country: Dominican Republic
- Dates: April 17 – 25, 2015
- Teams: 6
- Venue: 1 (in 1 host city)

Final positions
- Champions: Dominican Republic (1st title)

Tournament awards
- MVP: Gaila González (DOM)
- Best Setter: Yokaty Pérez (DOM)
- Best OH: Natalia Martínez (DOM); María Rodríguez (MEX)
- Best MB: Candelaria Herrera (ARG); Jineiry Martínez (DOM)
- Best OPP: Anahí Tosi (ARG)
- Best Libero: Gabriela Urretaviscaya (CHI)

The 2015 Women's Junior Pan-American Volleyball Cup was the third edition of the bi-annual women's volleyball tournament, played by six countries from April 17 – 25, 2015 in Santo Domingo, Dominican Republic.

== Competing nations ==
Teams who were able to participate in this tournament are those who took part at their respective continental junior championships, South America and NORCECA. Cuba and Colombia declined to participate and Peru and Guatemala failed to apply.

Pool A

Argentina
Chile
Costa Rica
Dominican Republic
Mexico
Nicaragua

== Competition format ==
The competition format for the 2015 Junior Pan American Volleyball Cup divides the 6 participating teams in 1 group of 6.

The best team from Group A and Group B will advance to the semifinals, the second and third teams from Group B will play the quarterfinals against the second and third teams from Pool A.

=== Pool standing procedure ===
Match won 3–0: 5 points for the winner, 0 point for the loser
Match won 3–1: 4 points for the winner, 1 points for the loser
Match won 3–2: 3 points for the winner, 2 points for the loser
In case of tie, the teams were classified according to the following criteria:
points ratio and sets ratio

== Preliminary round ==
=== Group A ===
Pos	Team	Pld	W	L	Pts	SPW	SPL	SPR	SW	SL	SR
1	Dominican Republic	5	5	0	25	375	191	1.963	15	0	MAX
2	Argentina	5	4	1	20	325	259	1.255	12	3	4.000
3	Mexico	5	3	2	13	360	303	1.188	9	8	1.125
4	Chile	5	2	3	12	353	331	1.066	8	9	0.889
5	Costa Rica	5	1	4	5	223	364	0.613	3	12	0.250
6	Nicaragua	5	0	5	0	155	375	0.413	0	15	0.000

Date	Time		Score		Set 1	Set 2	Set 3	Set 4	Set 5	Total	Report
19 Apr	15:00	Chile	3–0	Costa Rica	25–15	25–14	25–12			75–41	P2 P3
19 Apr	17:00	Argentina	3–0	Mexico	25–23	25–19	25–17			75–59	P2 P3
19 Apr	19:00	Dominican Republic	3–0	Nicaragua	25–3	25–7	25–5			75–15	P2 P3
20 Apr	15:00	Nicaragua	0–3	Argentina	8–25	10–26	8–25			26–76	P2 P3
20 Apr	17:00	Mexico	3–2	Chile	21–25	21–25	25–22	25–22	15–11	107–105	P2 P3
20 Apr	19:00	Dominican Republic	3–0	Costa Rica	25–7	25–9	25–16			75–32	P2 P3
21 Apr	15:00	Mexico	3–0	Nicaragua	25–6	25–5	25–6			75–17	P2 P3
21 Apr	17:00	Argentina	3–0	Costa Rica	25–12	25–13	25–19			75–44	P2 P3
21 Apr	19:00	Dominican Republic	3–0	Chile	25–18	25–16	25–9			75–43	P2 P3
22 Apr	15:00	Costa Rica	0–3	Mexico	10–25	10–25	11–25			31–75	P2 P3
22 Apr	17:00	Chile	3–0	Nicaragua	25–10	25–15	25–8			75–33	P2 P3
22 Apr	19:00	Dominican Republic	3–0	Argentina	25–19	25–22	25–14			75–55	P2 P3
23 Apr	15:00	Nicaragua	0–3	Costa Rica	23–25	21–25	20–25			64–75	P2 P3
23 Apr	17:00	Argentina	3–0	Chile	25–19	25–22	25–14			75–55	P2 P3
23 Apr	19:00	Dominican Republic	3–0	Mexico	25–21	25–16	25–9			75–46	P2 P3

== Final round ==
=== Fifth place match ===
Date	Time		Score		Set 1	Set 2	Set 3	Set 4	Set 5	Total	Report
24 Apr	15:00	Costa Rica	3–1	Nicaragua	25–23	12–25	25–21	25–16		87–85	P2 P3

=== Bronze medal match ===
Date	Time		Score		Set 1	Set 2	Set 3	Set 4	Set 5	Total	Report
24 Apr	17:00	Mexico	1–3	Chile	20–25	25–22	20–25	18–25		83–97	P2 P3

=== Final ===
Date	Time		Score		Set 1	Set 2	Set 3	Set 4	Set 5	Total	Report
24 Apr	19:00	Dominican Republic	3–1	Argentina	25–20	25–22	20–25	25–15		95–82	P2 P3

== Final standing ==
Rank	Team
1st place, gold medalist(s)	Dominican Republic
2nd place, silver medalist(s)	Argentina
3rd place, bronze medalist(s)	Chile
4	Mexico
5	Costa Rica
6	Nicaragua

2015 Women's Junior Pan-American Cup champions

Dominican Republic
1st title

== Individual awards ==
- Most valuable player
  - Gaila González (DOM)
- Best setter
  - Yokaty Pérez (DOM)
- Best Opposite
  - Anahí Tosi (ARG)
- Best Outside Hitters
  - Natalia Martínez (DOM)
  - María Rodríguez (MEX)
- Best Middle Blockers
  - Candelaria Herrera (ARG)
  - Jineiry Martínez (DOM)
- Best libero
  - Gabriela Urretaviscaya (CHI)
