= Yonkaira Peña =

Dominican volleyball player (born 1993)

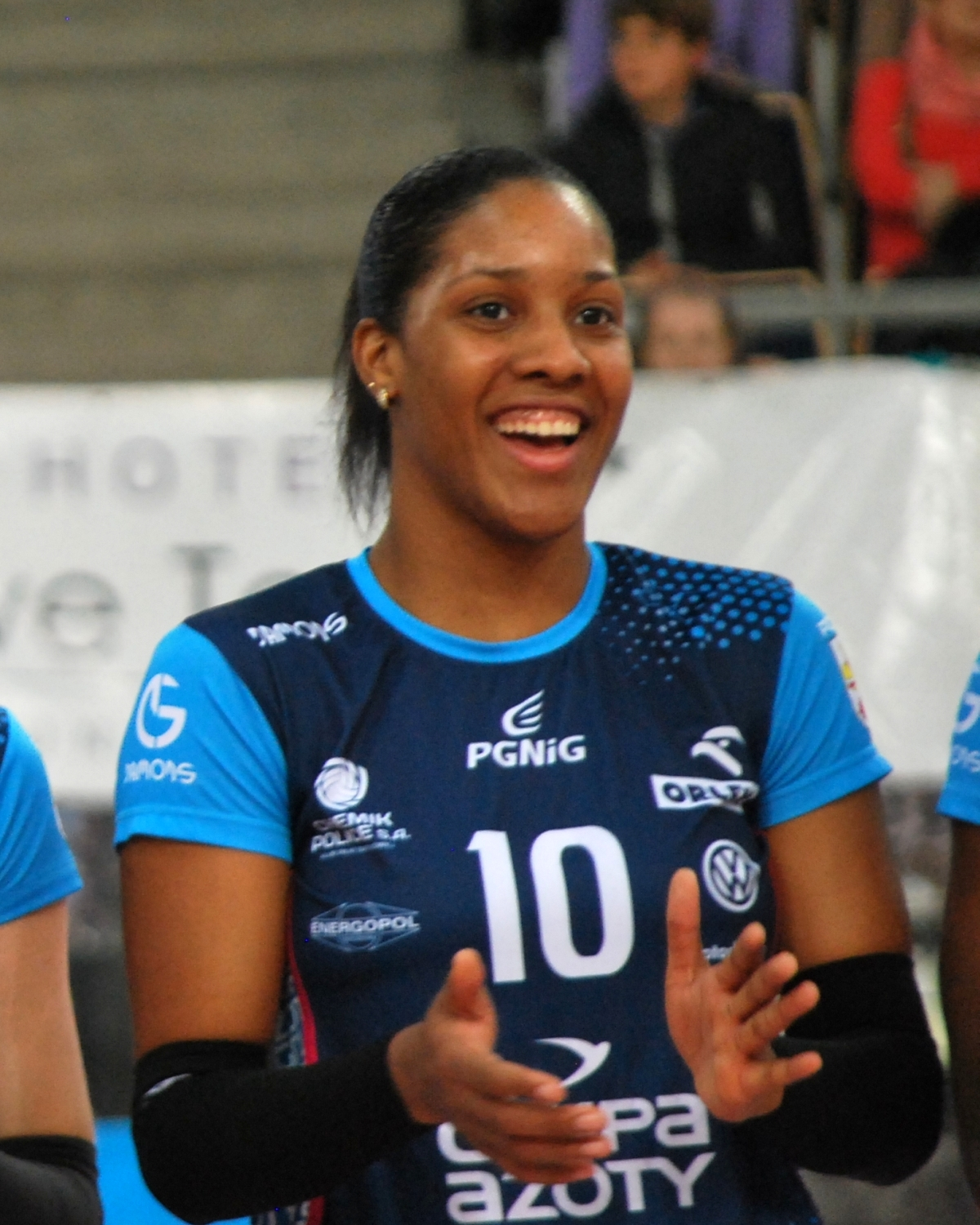
- Yonkaira Peña in 2015

Personal information
- Full name: Yonkaira Paola Peña Isabel
- Nationality: Dominican
- Born: May 10, 1993 (age 33) Santo Domingo, Dominican Republic
- Height: 1.90 m (6 ft 3 in)
- Weight: 70 kg (154 lb)
- Spike: 320 cm (126 in)
- Block: 310 cm (122 in)

Volleyball information
- Position: Outside hitter
- Current club: Jakarta Popsivo Polwan
Honours
Women's volleyball
Representing the Dominican Republic
Pan American Games
Gold medal – first place	2019 Lima	Team
Gold medal – first place	2023 Santiago	Team
Bronze medal – third place	2015 Toronto	Team
FIVB U23 World Championship
Silver medal – second place	2013 Tijuana	Team
Pan-American Cup
Gold medal – first place	2014 Mexico City	Team
Gold medal – first place	2016 Santo Domingo	Team
Gold medal – first place	2021 Santo Domingo	Team
Gold medal – first place	2022 Hermosillo	Team
Gold medal – first place	2025 Colima	Team
Silver medal – second place	2013 Lima	Team
Silver medal – second place	2015 Lima/Callao	Team
Silver medal – second place	2017 Cañete/Lima	Team
Silver medal – second place	2018 Santo Domingo	Team
NORCECA Championship
Silver medal – second place	2013 Omaha	Team
Central American and Caribbean Games
Gold medal – first place	2014 Veracruz	Team
Gold medal – first place	2026 Santo Domingo	Team

Yonkaira Paola Peña Isabel (born May 5, 1993, in Santo Domingo) is a Dominican volleyball player, who plays as an outside hitter. She was a member of the Women's National Team, who won the bronze medal with her native country at the 2008 NORCECA Girls' U18 Volleyball Continental Championship in Guaynabo, Puerto Rico wearing the number #16 jersey.

== Career ==
She played for Chemik Police for the 2015/16 season. Peña signed for the Brazilian club Sesc-RJ.

Peña helped her national team to win the gold medal at the 2026 Central American and Caribbean Games, the seventh consecutive for her home country. She was awarded tournament's Most Valuable Player and Best Spiker.

== Clubs ==
- (Dominican Republic) Mirador (2010–2011)
- (Peru) Universidad de San Martín de Porres (2011–2013)
- (Japan) Toray Arrows (2013–2014)
- (Turkey) Bursa BBSK (2014–2015)
- (Poland) Chemik Police (2015–2016)
- (Brazil) Rio de Janeiro VC (2017–2020)
- (Indonesia) Jakarta Pertamina Energi (2020)
- (Brazil) Rio de Janeiro VC (2021–2022)
- (Brazil) Gerdau Minas (2022–2025)
- (Indonesia) Jakarta Popsivo Polwan (2026–)

== Awards ==
=== Individuals ===
- 2012 U23 Pan-American Volleyball Cup "MVP"
- 2015 NORCECA Championship "Best outside hitter"
- 2026 Central American and Caribbean Games "Most valuable player"
- 2026 Central American and Caribbean Games "Best spiker"

== Clubs ==
- 2011–12 Peruvian League – Runner-up, with Universidad de San Martín de Porres
- 2012–13 Peruvian League – Runner-up, with Universidad de San Martín de Porres
- 2013–14 Japanese League – Bronze medal, with Toray Arrows
- 2014–15 CEV Challenge Cup – Champions, with Bursa BBSK
- 2015-16 Polish Supercup - Champions, with Chemik Police
- 2015-16 Polish League – Champions, with Chemik Police
- 2015-16 Polish Cup – Champions, with Chemik Police
- 2018 South American Club Championship – Runner-up, with Rio de Janeiro
- 2017–18 Brazilian Superliga – Runner-up, with Rio de Janeiro
- 2018 Carioca Championship – Champions, with Rio de Janeiro
