= 2016 Women's Pan-American Volleyball Cup =

Tournament details
- Host country: Dominican Republic
- Dates: 2–10 July
- Teams: 12
- Venue(s): Ricardo Arias Gymnasium & San Carlos Pavilion (in 1 host city)

Final positions
- Champions: Dominican Republic (4th title)

Tournament awards
- MVP: Brayelin Martínez (DOM)

The 2016 Women's Pan-American Volleyball Cup was the 15th edition of the annual women's volleyball tournament. It was held in Santo Domingo, Dominican Republic from 2 July to 10 July. Twelve teams competed in the tournament, won by the Dominican Republic when they defeated 3–2 to Puerto Rico. The United States claimed the bronze medal and Dominican Republic athlete Brayelin Martínez was awarded Most Valuable Player.

== Pools composition ==
Pool A	Pool B
Dominican Republic	United States
Puerto Rico	Argentina
Canada	Cuba
Colombia	Peru
Mexico	Costa Rica
Venezuela	Trinidad and Tobago

== Venue ==
- Ricardo Arias Gymnasium, Santo Domingo
- San Carlos Pavilion, Santo Domingo

== Pool standing procedure ==
1. Number of matches won
2. Match points
3. Points ratio
4. Sets ratio
5. Result of the last match between the tied teams

Match won 3–0: 5 match points for the winner, 0 match points for the loser
Match won 3–1: 4 match points for the winner, 1 match point for the loser
Match won 3–2: 3 match points for the winner, 2 match points for the loser

== Preliminary round ==
- All times are Atlantic Standard Time (UTC−04:00)

=== Group A ===
Pos	Team	Pld	W	L	Pts	SPW	SPL	SPR	SW	SL	SR	Qualification
1	Dominican Republic	5	5	0	24	393	291	1.351	15	1	15.000	Semifinals
2	Puerto Rico	5	4	1	20	365	291	1.254	12	3	4.000	Quarterfinals
3	Canada	5	3	2	13	384	377	1.019	9	8	1.125	Quarterfinals
4	Colombia	5	2	3	9	411	445	0.924	8	12	0.667	
5	Venezuela	5	1	4	7	337	405	0.832	5	12	0.417	
6	Mexico	5	0	5	2	328	409	0.802	2	15	0.133	

Date	Time		Score		Set 1	Set 2	Set 3	Set 4	Set 5	Total	Report
2 July	14:00	Canada	3–1	Colombia	25–21	18–25	25–16	25–21		93–83	P2 P3
2 July	18:00	Puerto Rico	3–0	Mexico	25–19	25–19	25–23			75–61	P2 P3
2 July	20:00	Dominican Republic	3–0	Venezuela	25–16	25–11	25–16			75–43	P2 P3
3 July	14:00	Colombia	0–3	Puerto Rico	18–25	17–25	15–25			50–75	P2 P3
3 July	16:00	Venezuela	1–3	Canada	25–22	20–25	29–31	21–25		95–103	P2 P3
3 July	20:00	Dominican Republic	3–0	Mexico	25–17	25–15	25–19			75–51	P2 P3
4 July	14:00	Mexico	0–3	Venezuela	17–25	20–25	20–25			57–75	P2 P3
4 July	16:00	Canada	0–3	Puerto Rico	19–25	17–25	19–25			55–75	P2 P3
4 July	20:00	Dominican Republic	3–1	Colombia	25–13	17–25	25–18	25–18		92–74	P2 P3
5 July	14:00	Puerto Rico	3–0	Venezuela	25–12	25–21	25–17			75–50	P2 P3
5 July	16:00	Colombia	3–2	Mexico	21–25	21–25	25–23	25–23	17–15	109–111	P2 P3
5 July	20:00	Dominican Republic	3–0	Canada	26–24	25–21	25–13			76–58	P2 P3
6 July	16:00	Mexico	0–3	Canada	16–25	18–25	14–25			48–75	P2 P3
6 July	16:00	Venezuela	1–3	Colombia	10–25	16–25	25–20	23–25		74–95	P2 P3
6 July	20:00	Dominican Republic	3–0	Puerto Rico	25–22	25–20	25–23			75–65	P2 P3

=== Group B ===
Pos	Team	Pld	W	L	Pts	SPW	SPL	SPR	SW	SL	SR	Qualification
1	United States	5	5	0	23	404	293	1.379	15	2	7.500	Semifinals
2	Cuba	5	3	2	18	397	347	1.144	12	6	2.000	Quarterfinals
3	Argentina	5	3	2	16	394	351	1.123	11	7	1.571	Quarterfinals
4	Peru	5	3	2	12	406	369	1.100	9	9	1.000	
5	Trinidad and Tobago	5	1	4	6	292	379	0.770	4	12	0.333	
6	Costa Rica	5	0	5	0	221	375	0.589	0	15	0.000	

Date	Time		Score		Set 1	Set 2	Set 3	Set 4	Set 5	Total	Report
2 July	14:00	Argentina	3–0	Costa Rica	25–10	25–17	25–15			75–42	P2 P3
2 July	16:00	Cuba	3–0	Trinidad and Tobago	25–20	25–14	25–19			75–53	P2 P3
2 July	16:00	United States	3–0	Peru	25–20	25–19	27–25			77–64	P2 P3
3 July	14:00	Costa Rica	0–3	Cuba	9–25	8–25	18–25			35–75	P2 P3
3 July	16:00	Trinidad and Tobago	0–3	United States	11–25	13–25	19–25			43–75	P2 P3
3 July	18:00	Peru	3–2	Argentina	25–16	25–19	24–26	20–25	15–11	109–97	P2 P3
4 July	14:00	Costa Rica	0–3	Peru	10–25	15–25	19–25			44–75	P2 P3
4 July	16:00	Argentina	3–0	Trinidad and Tobago	25–15	25–12	25–18			75–45	P2 P3
4 July	18:00	United States	3–2	Cuba	19–25	25–20	18–25	25–15	15–7	102–92	P2 P3
5 July	14:00	Trinidad and Tobago	1–3	Peru	19–25	25–23	17–25	15–25		76–98	P2 P3
5 July	16:00	Costa Rica	0–3	United States	16–25	10–25	18–25			44–75	P2 P3
5 July	18:00	Cuba	1–3	Argentina	25–22	17–25	23–25	15–25		80–97	P2 P3
6 July	14:00	Cuba	3–0	Peru	25–19	25–20	25–21			75–60	P2 P3
6 July	14:00	Trinidad and Tobago	3–0	Costa Rica	25–19	25–14	25–23			75–56	P2 P3
6 July	18:00	Argentina	0–3	United States	14–25	13–25	23–25			50–75	P2 P3

== Final round ==
=== Championship bracket ===
Quarterfinals
B2	Cuba	3
A3	Canada	2
A2	Puerto Rico	3
B3	Argentina	0

Semifinals
A1	Dominican Republic	3
B2	Cuba	0
B1	United States	1
A2	Puerto Rico	3

Finals
A1	Dominican Republic	3
A2	Puerto Rico	2
Third place
B2	Cuba	1
B1	United States	3

=== 5th–10th places bracket ===
Classification 5–10
A4	Colombia	3
B5	Trinidad and Tobago	0
B4	Peru	1
A5	Venezuela	3

Classification 5–8
B3	Argentina	3
A4	Colombia	2
A3	Canada	3
A5	Venezuela	0
Classification 9–10
B5	Trinidad and Tobago	0
B4	Peru	3

Classification 5–6
B3	Argentina	3
A3	Canada	0
Classification 7–8
A4	Colombia	3
A5	Venezuela	1

=== 11th place ===
Date	Time		Score		Set 1	Set 2	Set 3	Set 4	Set 5	Total	Report
8 July	14:00	Mexico	3–0	Costa Rica	25–17	25–16	25–20			75–53	P2 P3

=== 5th-10th Classification ===
Date	Time		Score		Set 1	Set 2	Set 3	Set 4	Set 5	Total	Report
8 July	16:00	Colombia	3–0	Trinidad and Tobago	25–21	25–17	25–17			75–55	P2 P3
8 July	16:00	Peru	1–3	Venezuela	27–25	30–32	18–25	20–25		95–107	P2 P3

=== Quarterfinals ===
Date	Time		Score		Set 1	Set 2	Set 3	Set 4	Set 5	Total	Report
8 July	18:00	Cuba	3–2	Canada	21–25	25–18	25–16	21–25	16–14	108–98	P2 P3
8 July	20:00	Puerto Rico	3–0	Argentina	25–11	25–13	25–18			75–42	P2 P3

=== 9th place ===
Date	Time		Score		Set 1	Set 2	Set 3	Set 4	Set 5	Total	Report
9 July	16:00	Trinidad and Tobago	0–3	Peru	21–25	13–25	16–25			50–75	P2 P3

=== 5th-8th Classification ===
Date	Time		Score		Set 1	Set 2	Set 3	Set 4	Set 5	Total	Report
9 July	14:00	Colombia	2–3	Argentina	18–25	25–23	25–21	25–27	8–15	101–111	P2 P3
9 July	16:00	Venezuela	0–3	Canada	20–25	16–25	22–25			58–75	P2 P3

=== Semifinals ===
Date	Time		Score		Set 1	Set 2	Set 3	Set 4	Set 5	Total	Report
9 July	18:00	United States	1–3	Puerto Rico	20–25	25–21	17–25	20–25		82–96	P2 P3
9 July	20:00	Dominican Republic	3–0	Cuba	25–11	25–22	25–21			75–54	P2 P3

=== 7th place ===
Date	Time		Score		Set 1	Set 2	Set 3	Set 4	Set 5	Total	Report
10 July	14:00	Colombia	3–1	Venezuela	25–19	20–25	25–17	25–13		95–74	P2 P3

=== 5th place ===
Date	Time		Score		Set 1	Set 2	Set 3	Set 4	Set 5	Total	Report
10 July	16:00	Argentina	3–0	Canada	25–21	25–23	25–23			75–67	P2 P3

=== 3rd place ===
Date	Time		Score		Set 1	Set 2	Set 3	Set 4	Set 5	Total	Report
10 July	15:00	United States	3–1	Cuba	20–25	25–9	25–15	25–9		95–58	P2 P3

=== Final ===
Date	Time		Score		Set 1	Set 2	Set 3	Set 4	Set 5	Total	Report
10 July	17:00	Puerto Rico	2–3	Dominican Republic	25–23	19–25	25–20	21–25	6–15	96–108	P2 P3

== Final standing ==
Rank	Team
1st place, gold medalist(s)	Dominican Republic
2nd place, silver medalist(s)	Puerto Rico
3rd place, bronze medalist(s)	United States
4	Cuba
5	Argentina
6	Canada
7	Colombia
8	Venezuela
9	Peru
10	Trinidad and Tobago
11	Mexico
12	Costa Rica

2016 Women's Pan-American Cup

Dominican Republic
4th title

14-woman roster
Vargas, Fernandez, Eve-Castillo, Fersola, Castillo, Dominguez,
Marte, Rivera, Peña, Mambrú, de la Cruz, Binet, B. Martínez, J. Martínez
Head Coach
Marcos Kwiek

== Individual awards ==
- Most valuable player
  (Dominican Republic) Brayelin Martínez
- Best setter
  (Peru) Alexandra Muñoz
- Best Outside Hitters
  (United States) Madison Kingdon
  (Dominican Republic) Brayelin Martínez
- Best Middle Blockers
  (Dominican Republic) Annerys Vargas
  (United States) Rhamat Alhassan
- Best Opposite
  (Puerto Rico) Karina Ocasio
- Best scorer
  (Colombia) Kenny Moreno
- Best server
  (United States) Micha Hancock
- Best libero
  (Dominican Republic) Brenda Castillo
- Best digger
  (Dominican Republic) Brenda Castillo
- Best receiver
  (Dominican Republic) Brenda Castillo
