= Italy women's national under-23 volleyball team =

Italy U23
- Association: FIPAV
- Confederation: CEV

Uniforms
Home	Away	Third

FIVB U23 World Championship
- Appearances: 2 (First in 2013)
- Best result: 6th place : (2013, 2015)

The Italy women's national under-23 volleyball team represents Italy in international women's volleyball competitions and friendly matches under age 23 and it is ruled by the Italian Volleyball Federation That is an affiliate of International Volleyball Federation FIVB and also a part of European Volleyball Confederation CEV.

== Results ==
=== FIVB U23 World Championship ===
Champions Runners up Third place Fourth place

FIVB U23 World Championship
Year	Round	Position	Pld	W	L	SW	SL	Squad
(Mexico) 2013		6th place						Squad
(Turkey) 2015		6th place						Squad
(Slovenia) 2017	Withdrew							
Total	0 Titles	2/3						

== Team ==
=== Current squad ===
The following is the Italian roster in the 2015 FIVB Volleyball Women's U23 World Championship.

Head Coach: Luca Cristofani

No.	Name	Date of birth	Height	Weight	Spike	Block	2015 club
2	Alice Degradi	4 October 1996	1.82 m (6 ft 0 in)	75 kg (165 lb)	312 cm (123 in)	300 cm (120 in)	(Italy) Yamamay Busto Arsizio
3	Carlotta Cambi	28 May 1996	1.77 m (5 ft 10 in)	66 kg (146 lb)	302 cm (119 in)	292 cm (115 in)	(Italy) Bakery Piacenza
4	Francesca Bosio	7 August 1997	1.80 m (5 ft 11 in)	69 kg (152 lb)	294 cm (116 in)	284 cm (112 in)	(Italy) Igor Gorgonzola Novara
6	Sofia D'Odorico (C)	6 January 1997	1.87 m (6 ft 2 in)	78 kg (172 lb)	312 cm (123 in)	302 cm (119 in)	(Italy) Club Italia
9	Sara Bonifacio	3 July 1996	1.88 m (6 ft 2 in)	76 kg (168 lb)	320 cm (130 in)	300 cm (120 in)	(Italy) Igor Volley Novara
10	Giulia Angelina	26 February 1997	1.90 m (6 ft 3 in)	89 kg (196 lb)	300 cm (120 in)	284 cm (112 in)	(Italy) Yamamay Busto Arsizio
11	Anna Danesi	20 April 1996	1.93 m (6 ft 4 in)	75 kg (165 lb)	301 cm (119 in)	284 cm (112 in)	(Italy) Club Italia
12	Anastasia Guerra	15 October 1996	1.87 m (6 ft 2 in)	80 kg (180 lb)	300 cm (120 in)	286 cm (113 in)	(Italy) Club Italia
13	Chiara De Bortoli	28 July 1997	1.80 m (5 ft 11 in)	68 kg (150 lb)	302 cm (119 in)	286 cm (113 in)	(Italy) Volley Pool Piave San Donà
15	Beatrice Berti	12 January 1996	1.93 m (6 ft 4 in)	87 kg (192 lb)	304 cm (120 in)	288 cm (113 in)	(Italy) Club Italia
16	Anna Nicoletti	3 January 1996	1.93 m (6 ft 4 in)	86 kg (190 lb)	306 cm (120 in)	290 cm (110 in)	(Italy) Club Italia
18	Elisa Zanette	17 February 1996	1.93 m (6 ft 4 in)	86 kg (190 lb)	304 cm (120 in)	288 cm (113 in)	(Italy) Igor Gorgonzola Novara
