= Germany women's national under-23 volleyball team =

Germany
- Nickname(s): Die Schmetterlinge (The butterflies). Die Adler (The Eagles); Die Mannschaft (The Team)
- Association: Deutscher Volleyball-Verband
- Confederation: CEV

Uniforms
Home	Away

FIVB U23 World Championship
- Appearances: 1 (First in 2013)
- Best result: 8th place : (2013)
- www.volleyball-verband.de (in German)

The Germany women's national under-23 volleyball team represents Germany in international women's volleyball competitions and friendly matches under the age 23 and it is ruled by the German Volleyball Association That is an affiliate of International Volleyball Federation FIVB and also a part of European Volleyball Confederation CEV.

== Results ==
=== FIVB U23 World Championship ===
Champions Runners up Third place Fourth place

FIVB U23 World Championship
Year	Round	Position	Pld	W	L	SW	SL	Squad
(Mexico) 2013		8th						Squad
(Turkey) 2015	Didn't Qualify							
(Slovenia) 2017	Didn't Qualify							
Total	0 Titles	1/3						

== Team ==
=== Current squad ===
No.	Name	Date of birth	Height	Weight	Spike	Block	2015 club
			1.00 m (3 ft 3 in)	0 kg (0 lb)	000 cm (0 in)	000 cm (0 in)	
			1.00 m (3 ft 3 in)	0 kg (0 lb)	000 cm (0 in)	000 cm (0 in)	
			1.00 m (3 ft 3 in)	0 kg (0 lb)	000 cm (0 in)	000 cm (0 in)	
			1.00 m (3 ft 3 in)	0 kg (0 lb)	000 cm (0 in)	000 cm (0 in)	
			1.00 m (3 ft 3 in)	0 kg (0 lb)	000 cm (0 in)	000 cm (0 in)	
			1.00 m (3 ft 3 in)	0 kg (0 lb)	000 cm (0 in)	000 cm (0 in)	
			1.00 m (3 ft 3 in)	0 kg (0 lb)	000 cm (0 in)	000 cm (0 in)	
			1.00 m (3 ft 3 in)	0 kg (0 lb)	000 cm (0 in)	000 cm (0 in)	
			1.00 m (3 ft 3 in)	0 kg (0 lb)	000 cm (0 in)	000 cm (0 in)	
			1.00 m (3 ft 3 in)	0 kg (0 lb)	000 cm (0 in)	000 cm (0 in)	
			1.00 m (3 ft 3 in)	0 kg (0 lb)	000 cm (0 in)	000 cm (0 in)	
			1.00 m (3 ft 3 in)	0 kg (0 lb)	000 cm (0 in)	000 cm (0 in)	
