= Brayelin Martínez =

Dominican Republic volleyball player

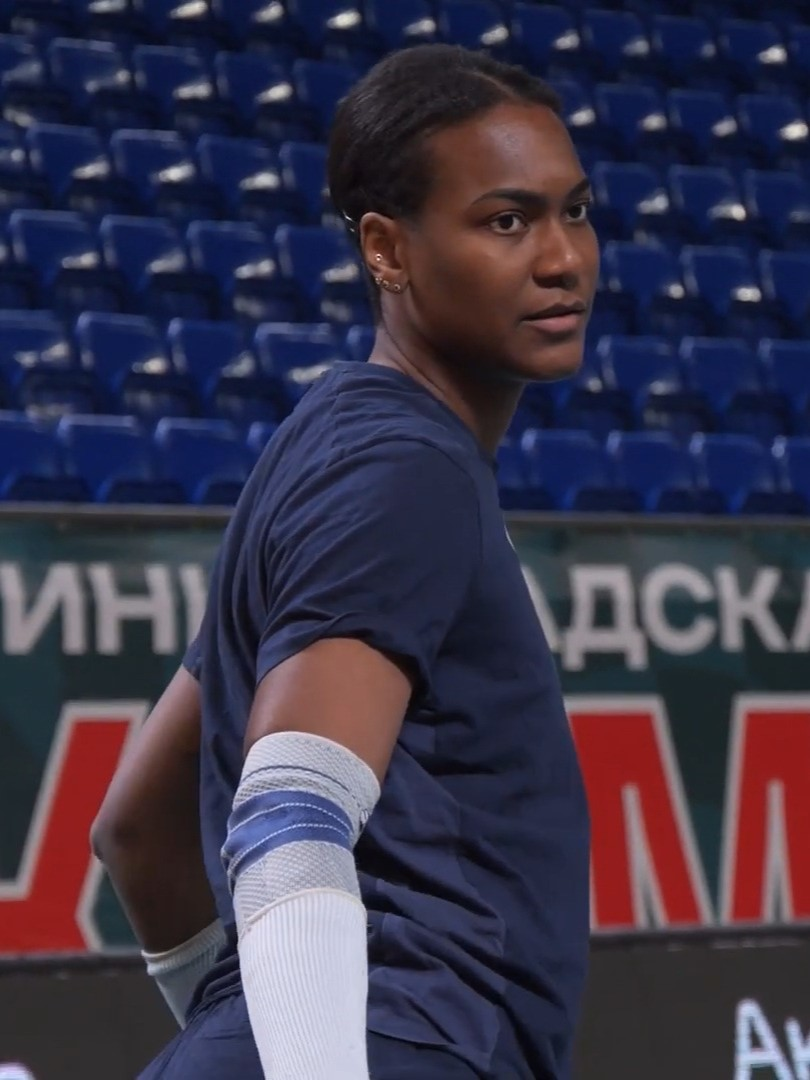

Personal information
- Full name: Brayelin Elizabeth Martínez
- Nationality: Dominican
- Born: September 11, 1996 (age 30) Santo Domingo, Dominican Republic
- Home town: Santo Domingo
- Education: Universidad APEC
- Height: 2.01 m (6 ft 7 in)
- Weight: 83 kg (183 lb)
- Spike: 330 cm (130 in)
- Block: 320 cm (130 in)

Volleyball information
- Position: Outside hitter/Opposite
- Current club: Dinamo AK-Bars
- Number: 23

National team
- Years: Team
- 2011-: Dominican Republic
Honours
Women's volleyball
Representing the Dominican Republic
Pan American Games
Gold medal – first place	2019 Lima	Team
Gold medal – first place	2023 Santiago	Team
Bronze medal – third place	2015 Toronto	Team
NORCECA Championship
Gold medal – first place	2023 Quebec
Gold medal – first place	2019 San Juan	Team
Silver medal – second place	2013 Omaha	Team
Pan-American Cup
Gold medal – first place	2014 Mexico City	Team
Gold medal – first place	2016 Santo Domingo	Team
Gold medal – first place	2021 Santo Domingo	Team
Gold medal – first place	2025 Colima	Team
Silver medal – second place	2013 Lima	Team
Silver medal – second place	2015 Lima/Callao	Team
Silver medal – second place	2017 Cañete/Lima	Team
Silver medal – second place	2018 Santo Domingo	Team
Silver medal – second place	2019 Trujillo and Chiclayo	Team
FIVB U23 World Championship
Silver medal – second place	2013 Tijuana	Team
Bronze medal – third place	2015 Ankara	Team
FIVB U20 World Championship
Gold medal – first place	2015 Puerto Rico	Team
Central American and Caribbean Games
Gold medal – first place	2014 Veracruz	Team
Gold medal – first place	2026 Santo Domingo	Team
Bolivarian Games
Gold medal – first place	2017 Santa Marta	Team

Brayelin Elizabeth Martínez (born September 11, 1996, in Santo Domingo) is a Dominican volleyball player who won the bronze medal in the 2015 Pan American Games as a member of the Dominican Republic national team. She played in the 2014 Senior World Championship and the 2011 and 2015 FIVB World Cup.

With their under-age national teams, she won the gold medal in the 2015 U20 World Championship, silver medal in the 2013 FIVB U23 World Championship and bronze in the 2015 FIVB U23 World Championship. With the senior team she won the gold medal in the 2014 and 2016 Pan-American Cup and silver in 2013 and 2015; silver in the 2013 NORCECA Continental Championship and gold in the 2014 Central American and Caribbean Games, 2016 U23 Pan-American Cup and the 2017 Bolivarian Games, where she was the flag bearer.

In 2013, she competed in five worldwide championships: the U20 World Championship, U18 World Championship, World Grand Prix, U23 World Championship and the World Grand Champions Cup. She plays as an outside hitter for the Dominican club Mirador, playing with this club the 2011 and 2015 Club World Championship.

She received the Dominican Republic Guild of Sport Writers award as the 2013 volleyball player of the year. She won the 2014 Santo Domingo Province Superior Tournament with the Dominican club Playeras de Boca Chica.

== Personal life ==
Martínez is 201 cm (6 ft 7 in) tall 83 kilograms (183 lb), born on September 11, 1996, in Villa Juana, Santo Domingo, Distrito Nacional. Her parents are Agripina Martínez, who also served as Dominican Republic youth and junior squads team manager, and Juan Doñe (deceased 2008). Her siblings are Jineiry who also plays for the Dominican Republic national volleyball teams and Bryan, who signed as pitcher for the Pittsburgh Pirates but later opted to play professional basketball with Titanes del Distrito Nacional. She is a cousin of the basketball player Jack Michael Martínez and niece of the former national team basketball player and politician Vice-Minister of Sports Soterio Ramírez. Martinez felt attracted to volleyball when she was seven years old, during the 2003 Pan American Games. She is a Bachelor of Business Administration student in Universidad APEC.

== Career ==
=== 2010 ===
The club Centro claimed the San Cristobal superior tournament championship and Martínez was selected the Most Valuable Player. She later played with Distrito Nacional, losing to La Romana the final match of the National Cup and being named Best Spiker.

=== 2011 ===
Martinez helped Cienfuegos to win the Santiago province volleyball tournament. She played the Movistar Cup in Peru with her junior team that reached the silver medal. In June, Martinez won the silver medal at the Junior Pan-American Cup and later, in July, she led her team with 31 points in the bronze medal match of the Youth Pan-American Cup with her national team and was elected Best Spiker.

During the FIVB U20 World Championship, she helped her junior team reach fifth place and ending the tournament in fourth place among the scorers. She later played with the Dominican club Mirador Santo Domingo that played the Club World Championship. Her team finished in 4th place after losing the Bronze Medal match to the Brazilian team Sollys/Nestle. She then played the Youth National Championship with Distrito Nacional, being named to take the Oath on behalf of all the athletes. She later debuted with her senior team during the FIVB World Cup as the youngest player, helping her team to reach the eight place, the best position ever.

=== 2012 ===
Martinez played the Senior Pan-American Cup in Ciudad Juarez, Mexico joining the first Dominican team left out of the podium of the Pan-American Cup when they lost 2–3 to Cuba. She then played the FIVB World Grand Prix as a sixteen-years-old, the youngest player in the tournament. Her team reached the twelfth position.

The Dominican Republic Junior team lost to the USA Junior team to settle the silver medal in the High Performance Championships international junior division, and Martinez received an All tournament team inclusion. The Dominican Republic Youth National team moved to Tijuana, conquering the Youth NORCECA Championship silver medal and Martinez won the Best Scorer and Best Spiker awards.

Even getting the Best Scorer individual award, Martinez led the Under 20 national team to the gold medal at the Junior NORCECA Championship, qualifying for the 2013 Junior World Championship. and the U23 Pan-American Cup gold medal. She led Distrito Nacional to the Junior National Championship win over La Romana. She was named tournament's Most Valuable Player and Best Scorer.

=== 2013 ===
Martinez traveled with her junior national team to Tijuana, Mexico to play the Baja California Internacional tournament as a preparation tournament. There they conquered the tournament championship after defeating 2–0 to the Baja California junior team. She then moved to Guatemala where she won with her U-18 squad the Youth Pan-American Cup bronze medal match 3–1 to Argentina after losing 2–3 to Puerto Rico due to lack of concentration.

During the Junior Pan-American Cup held in La Habana, Cuba, Martínez settled the silver medal when her junior team lost 1–3 to Mexico. Along with Winifer Fernández and Larysmer Martínez, they won the 7th Cabarete Beach Volleyball Tournament, winning a RD$30,000 (approximately US$713 in April 2013) bonus.

Martínez won the bronze medal in the 28th Montreux Volley Masters and later played the Pan-American Cup helping her senior team to win the silver medal, shortly afterwards played the FIVB U20 World Championship in June, ranking eight with her national team and tied at 167 with the Chinese player Zhu Ting as the best scorer of the tournament. She then played the FIVB U18 World Championship and ranked eight with her national team and was selected one of the Best Outside Hitters. She ranked fourth among the top scorer with 149 points. In August, she helped her national senior team to reach the tenth place at the FIVB World Grand Prix. In September, she won the silver medal with her senior team in the NORCECA Continental Championship. In October, she played the 2013 FIVB U23 World Championship winning the silver medal after being defeated by China in the gold medal match. She was again selected one of the Best Outside Hitters.

In November, Martínez played her fifth worldwide tournament, the FIVB World Grand Champions Cup; as part of the senior team that defeated Thailand and ranked last and sixth in their World Grand Champions Cup participation after being selected via wild card. accumulating 57,801 57,801 kilometres (35,916 mi) between March and October.

=== 2014 ===
In March, Martínez won the Santo Domingo Province superior tournament, playing with Playeras de Boca Chica and being the team top scorer. She later guided UNAPEC to win the National College tournament.

The Dominican Republic Guild of Sport Writers awarded Martínez as the volleyball player of the year and also nominating her for the top award, won by the jockey Joel Rosario. She helped her senior national team to reach the World Championship qualification, playing in La Romana, Dominican Republic. She was said to be disciplined, brave and courageous. She served as the captain for her team in the NORCECA Junior Championship, that she helped reach the bronze medal. When the Dominican Republic senior team was affected by the Chikungunya virus, Martínez led the offensive, nonetheless the team went 1-8 and ranked last in the Group 1 of the FIVB World Grand Prix after only defeating Turkey 3–2.

The Dominican Republic won its second U23 Pan-American Cup, when they defeated 3-1 Colombia in the final match. Martínez served as the captain of her national team and was selected Most Valuable Player, and also awarded Best Scorer and Best Spiker.

Martínez played her first Senior World Championship in Italy, being dubbed "Caribbean Gamova" helping her national team to start the competition undefeated 5-0 defeating Italy 3–2. After a 7–2 start, her team qualified for the first time to the World Championship third round besides losing 2–3 to China, but could not qualify to the semifinals after losing their two third round matches 2–3 to China and 0–3 to Brazil. Martínez's national finished in fifth place. She later traveled to Veracruz, Mexico, to play the Central American and Caribbean Games. and helped her national team to win their fourth consecutive gold medal.

=== 2015 ===
Martínez joined the Dominican club Mirador, when the club was selected as wild card to play the FIVB Club World Championship as one of the younger players that the club head coach Marcos Kwiek want them to enrich their level. Her club lost its two matches 1–3 to the Swiss Voléro Zürich and 0–3 to the Brazilian Rexona Ades Rio and finally ranking tied-fifth with the Japanese Hisamitsu Springs. Martínez participated in the 2015 Montreux Volley Masters, but her national team lost the fifth place match 1–3 to Germany. Soon after that, she took part of the NORCECA Champions Cup, taking home the gold medal and the qualification for the 2015 FIVB World Cup.

She later played the Pan-American Cup in Peru, winning the silver medal when her national team lost to the United States 0–3 in the championship match. In spite of that, they qualified to the 2016 FIVB Grand Prix. As part of a historic Dominican Republic delegation to the 2015 Pan American Games, she won with her national team the bronze medal after losing to the United States in the semifinals and defeated 3-1 the Puerto Rico national team. Martínez then traveled to Ankara, Turkey to play the U23 World Championship, winning the bronze medal after falling 2–3 to Brazil but defeating Japan 3–2 to settle with the bronze and the Best Outside Spiker award.

After going 6–0 after the pool play rounds at the U20 World Championship, she helped with 27 points her junior national team to win 3–2 over Italy and 32 points in the win 3–2 over Brazil to clain the first ever volleyball title for the Dominican Republic. She, as team captain, described patience and concentration as the keys for their win at the time she expressed the satisfaction for being awarded Most Valuable Player of the tournament. She was also awarded Best Outside Hitter and topped all the scorers with 177 points.

On 8 October the Italian volleyball club Südtirol Neruda Bolzano announced her joining.

=== 2016 ===
Playing the World Grand Prix Group II, she won with her national senior team the group gold medal and later lead her senior national team to the Pan-American Cup gold medal in home soil. She was awarded tournament's Most Valuable Player and Best Outside Spiker.

The Dominican Republic claimed the third U23 Pan-American Cup gold medal by winning the 2016 edition held in Peru were Martínez claimed the Most Valuable Player and Best Wing Spiker awards.

Martínez kept herself in the Italian League when she signed with Unet Yamamay Busto Arsizio, after a season spent with Südtirol Neruda Bolzano, finishing the season as one of the top scorers with 360 points.

=== 2017 ===
With Unet Yamamay Busto Arsizio, Martínez won the silver medal in the 2016–17 CEV Cup, when her club lost to the Russian Dynamo Kazan in the finals.

For the 2017/18 season, she moved to the Italian club Pomì Casalmaggiore. She served as Flag bearer for their national representation at the 2017 Bolivarian Games, winning the gold medal over Peru and Colombia. In 2019, playing with the Turkish club Aydın Büyükşehir Belediyespor, she settled with the silver medal at the 2018–19 CEV Challenge Cup, when they lost to Italian Saugella Team Monza.

=== 2023 ===
She won the 2022/23 Brazilian Superliga Championship with Dentil/Praia Clube when they defeated 3–0 to Gerdau/Minas. Later that month, Martínez won the South American Club Championship, when her club defeated 3–2 to fellow Brazilian club Gerdau Minas. She was named Most Valuable Player and Best outside spiker. After this victory, she said goodbye to Minas, recalling the good times she spent with the clubs and satisfied with the work done in Uberlândia, also promising that Brazil with always be in her heart. With her national team, she won the Pan American Games gold medal and Best Spiker award.

=== 2024 ===
She was transferred to the Russian club Dinamo-Ak Bars for the 2023–2024 season, winning the Super League Championship and the Best Spiker award.

=== 2026 ===
Martínez helped her national team to win the gold medal at the 2026 Central American and Caribbean Games, the seventh consecutive for her home country. She was awarded tournament's Best Spiker.

== Clubs ==
- (Dominican Republic) Distrito Nacional (2010)
- (Dominican Republic) Centro (2010)
- (Dominican Republic) Mirador (2011)
- (Dominican Republic) Cienfuegos (2011)
- (Dominican Republic) Distrito Nacional (2011–2012)
- (Dominican Republic) Playeras de Boca Chica (2014)
- (Dominican Republic) Mirador (2015)
- (Italy) Südtirol Neruda Bolzano (2015–2016)
- (Italy) Unet Yamamay Busto Arsizio (2016–2017)
- (Italy) Pomì Casalmaggiore (2017–2018)
- (Turkey) Aydın Büyükşehir Belediye Spor Kulübü (2018–2019)
- (Brazil) Praia Clube (2019–2023)
- (Russia) Dinamo-Ak Bars (2023-)

== Awards ==
=== Individuals ===
- 2011 Youth Pan-American Cup "Best spiker"
- 2012 NORCECA Junior Championship "Best scorer"
- 2012 NORCECA Youth Championship "Best scorer"
- 2012 NORCECA Youth Championship "Best spiker"
- 2013 FIVB U18 World Championship "Best outside hitter"
- 2013 FIVB U23 World Championship "Best outside hitter"
- 2014 U23 Pan-American Cup "Most valuable player"
- 2014 U23 Pan-American Cup "Best scorer"
- 2014 U23 Pan-American Cup "Best spiker"
- 2015 FIVB U23 World Championship "Best outside spiker"
- 2015 FIVB U20 World Championship "Best outside spiker"
- 2015 FIVB U20 World Championship "Most valuable player"
- 2016 Pan-American Cup "Most valuable player"
- 2016 Pan-American Cup "Best outside hitter"
- 2016 U23 Pan-American Cup "Most valuable player"
- 2016 U23 Pan-American Cup "Best spiker"
- 2019 Pan American Games "Best outside hitters"
- 2019 Pan-American Cup "Best outside hittersr"
- 2019 NORCECA Championship "Most valuable player"
- 2023 South American Club Championship "Most valuable player"
- 2023 South American Club Championship "Best outside spiker"
- 2023 Pan American Games "Best spiker"
- 2023-24 Russian Super League "Best spiker"
- 2026 Central American and Caribbean Games "Best spiker"

=== Clubs ===
- 2010 Dominican Republic Cup - Runner-Up, with Distrito Nacional
- 2012 Junior National Championship - Champion, with Distrito Nacional
- 2014 Santo Domingo Province Superior Tournament - Champion, with Playeras de Boca Chica
- 2016–17 CEV Cup - Runner-Up, with Unet Yamamay Busto Arsizio
- 2018–19 CEV Challenge Cup – Runner-Up, with Aydın Büyükşehir Belediyespor
- 2020–21 Brazilian Superliga – Runner-Up, with Dentil/Praia Clube
- 2021 South American Club Championship – Champion, with Dentil/Praia Clube
- 2021–22 Brazilian Superliga – Runner-Up, with Dentil/Praia Clube
- 2022 South American Club Championship – Runner-Up, with Dentil/Praia Clube
- 2022–23 Brazilian Superliga – Champion, with Dentil/Praia Clube
- 2023 South American Club Championship – Champion, with Dentil/Praia Clube
- 2023–24 Russian Super League – Champion, with Dinamo-Ak Bars
