= 2012 Girls' Youth NORCECA Volleyball Championship =

Tournament details
- Host country: Mexico
- Dates: August 6–11, 2012
- Teams: 7
- Venue: 1 (in 1 host city)

Final positions
- Champions: United States (7th title)

Tournament awards
- MVP: Carli Snyder (USA)

The 2012 Girls' Youth NORCECA Volleyball Championship was the eighth edition of the bi-annual women's volleyball tournament, played by seven countries from August 6–11, 2012 in Tijuana, Baja California, Mexico. The event served as qualifier to the 2013 Girls Youth World Championship

== Competing nations ==
| Group A | Group B |
|---|---|
| Costa Rica; Guatemala; Mexico; United States | Dominican Republic; Puerto Rico; Trinidad and Tobago |

== Preliminary round ==
=== Group A ===
| Pos | Team | Pld | W | L | Pts | SPW | SPL | SPR | SW | SL | SR | Qualification |
|---|---|---|---|---|---|---|---|---|---|---|---|---|
| 1 | United States | 3 | 3 | 0 | 15 | 225 | 102 | 2.206 | 9 | 0 | MAX | Semifinals |
| 2 | Mexico | 3 | 2 | 1 | 10 | 193 | 145 | 1.331 | 6 | 3 | 2.000 | Quarterfinals |
| 3 | Guatemala | 3 | 1 | 2 | 3 | 163 | 250 | 0.652 | 3 | 8 | 0.375 | Quarterfinals |
| 4 | Costa Rica | 3 | 0 | 3 | 2 | 172 | 256 | 0.672 | 2 | 9 | 0.222 | |

| Date | Time | | Score | | Set 1 | Set 2 | Set 3 | Set 4 | Set 5 | Total | Report |
|---|---|---|---|---|---|---|---|---|---|---|---|
| 6 Aug | 15:00 | United States | 3–0 | Costa Rica | 25–15 | 25–11 | 25–10 | | | 75–36 | P2 |
| 6 Aug | 19:00 | Mexico | 3–0 | Guatemala | 25–13 | 25–12 | 25–9 | | | 75–34 | P2 |
| 7 Aug | 15:00 | United States | 3–0 | Guatemala | 25–6 | 25–5 | 25–12 | | | 75–23 | P2 |
| 7 Aug | 19:00 | Mexico | 3–0 | Costa Rica | 25–15 | 25–11 | 25–10 | | | 75–36 | P2 |
| 8 Aug | 15:00 | Costa Rica | 2–3 | Guatemala | 21–25 | 25–17 | 26–24 | 17–25 | 11–15 | 100–106 | P2 |
| 8 Aug | 19:00 | Mexico | 0–3 | United States | 14–25 | 12–25 | 17–25 | | | 43–75 | P2 |

=== Group B ===
| Pos | Team | Pld | W | L | Pts | SPW | SPL | SPR | SW | SL | SR | Qualification |
|---|---|---|---|---|---|---|---|---|---|---|---|---|
| 1 | Dominican Republic | 2 | 2 | 0 | 10 | 150 | 79 | 1.899 | 6 | 0 | MAX | Semifinals |
| 2 | Puerto Rico | 2 | 1 | 1 | 5 | 135 | 97 | 1.392 | 3 | 3 | 1.000 | Quarterfinals |
| 3 | Trinidad and Tobago | 2 | 0 | 2 | 0 | 41 | 150 | 0.273 | 0 | 6 | 0.000 | Quarterfinals |

| Date | Time | | Score | | Set 1 | Set 2 | Set 3 | Set 4 | Set 5 | Total | Report |
|---|---|---|---|---|---|---|---|---|---|---|---|
| 6 Aug | 17:00 | Puerto Rico | 3–0 | Trinidad and Tobago | 25–7 | 25–7 | 25–8 | | | 75–22 | P2 |
| 7 Aug | 17:00 | Dominican Republic | 3–0 | Trinidad and Tobago | 25–8 | 25–6 | 25–5 | | | 75–19 | P2 |
| 8 Aug | 17:00 | Dominican Republic | 3–0 | Puerto Rico | 25–20 | 25–21 | 25–19 | | | 75–60 | P2 |

== Final round ==
=== Championship bracket ===
Quarterfinals
B2 | Puerto Rico | 3
A3 | Guatemala | 0
A2 | Mexico | 3
B3 | Trinidad and Tobago | 0

Semifinals
A1 | United States | 3
B2 | Puerto Rico | 1
B1 | Dominican Republic | 3
A2 | Mexico | 0

Finals
A1 | United States | 3
B1 | Dominican Republic | 1
Third place
A2 | Mexico | 3
B2 | Puerto Rico | 2

=== Quarterfinals ===
| Date | Time | | Score | | Set 1 | Set 2 | Set 3 | Set 4 | Set 5 | Total | Report |
|---|---|---|---|---|---|---|---|---|---|---|---|
| 9 Aug | 17:00 | Puerto Rico | 3–0 | Guatemala | 25–8 | 25–10 | 25–18 | | | 75–36 | P2 |
| 9 Aug | 19:00 | Mexico | 3–0 | Trinidad and Tobago | 25–6 | 25–10 | 25–5 | | | 75–21 | P2 |

=== Semifinals ===
| Date | Time | | Score | | Set 1 | Set 2 | Set 3 | Set 4 | Set 5 | Total | Report |
|---|---|---|---|---|---|---|---|---|---|---|---|
| 10 Aug | 17:00 | United States | 3–1 | Puerto Rico | 26–24 | 25–13 | 19–25 | 25–13 | | 95–75 | P2 |
| 10 Aug | 19:00 | Dominican Republic | 3–0 | Mexico | 25–22 | 25–22 | 25–12 | | | 75–56 | P2 |

=== Fifth place match ===
| Date | Time | | Score | | Set 1 | Set 2 | Set 3 | Set 4 | Set 5 | Total | Report |
|---|---|---|---|---|---|---|---|---|---|---|---|
| 10 Aug | 15:00 | Guatemala | 3–0 | Trinidad and Tobago | 25–8 | 25–13 | 25–17 | | | 75–38 | P2 |

=== Bronze medal match ===
| Date | Time | | Score | | Set 1 | Set 2 | Set 3 | Set 4 | Set 5 | Total | Report |
|---|---|---|---|---|---|---|---|---|---|---|---|
| 11 Aug | 17:00 | Mexico | 3–2 | Puerto Rico | 25–23 | 22–25 | 25–17 | 21–25 | 15–13 | 108–103 | P2 |

=== Final ===
| Date | Time | | Score | | Set 1 | Set 2 | Set 3 | Set 4 | Set 5 | Total | Report |
|---|---|---|---|---|---|---|---|---|---|---|---|
| 11 Aug | 19:00 | Dominican Republic | 1–3 | United States | 25–21 | 17–25 | 23–25 | 15–25 | | 80–96 | P2 |

== Final standing ==
| Rank | Team |
|---|---|
| 1st place, gold medalist(s) | United States |
| 2nd place, silver medalist(s) | Dominican Republic |
| 3rd place, bronze medalist(s) | Mexico |
| 4 | Puerto Rico |
| 5 | Guatemala |
| 6 | Trinidad and Tobago |
| 7 | Costa Rica |

2012 Girls' Youth NORCECA champions

United States
7th title

== Individual awards ==
- Most valuable player
  - Carli Snyder (USA)
- Best scorer
  - Brayelin Martínez (DOM)
- Best spiker
  - Brayelin Martínez (DOM)
- Best blocker
  - Daniela Vargas (CRC)
- Best server
  - Fernanda Bañuelos (MEX)
- Best digger
  - Kimberly Gutiérrez (MEX)
- Best setter
  - Taylor Tashima (USA)
- Best receiver
  - Kimberly Gutiérrez (MEX)
- Best libero
  - Kimberly Gutiérrez (MEX)
