= 2015 FIVB Volleyball Women's U20 World Championship – European qualification =

The European qualification for the 2015 FIVB Women's Junior World Championship, in Puerto Rico will be played over two rounds.

In the first round of qualification, 20 teams are split into five groups. The group winners and the best second place team will qualify for the second round and join the champion and the vice-champion of the 2014 Women's Junior European Volleyball Championship already secured in the second round.

== Qualification phase 1 ==
=== Pools ===
The pools were confirmed by CEV on October 7, 2014.

Pool A	Pool B	Pool C	Pool D	Pool E
Italy; France; Finland; Norway	Turkey; Greece; Croatia; Estonia	Russia; Germany; Romania; Israel	Belgium; Poland; Netherlands; Latvia	Czech Republic; Bulgaria; Austria; Denmark

=== Pool A ===
- Venue: Centro Pavesi, Milan, Italy
- All times are Central European Time (UTC+01:00).

Pos	Team	Pld	W	L	Pts	SW	SL	SR	SPW	SPL	SPR	Qualification
1	Italy	3	3	0	8	9	2	4.500	251	172	1.459	Qualification phase 2
2	France	3	2	1	7	8	3	2.667	250	204	1.225	Qualification phase 2
3	Finland	3	1	2	3	3	6	0.500	193	196	0.985	
4	Norway	3	0	3	0	0	9	0.000	103	225	0.458	

Date	Time		Score		Set 1	Set 2	Set 3	Set 4	Set 5	Total	Report
9 Jan	16:30	Norway	0–3	France	12–25	8–25	16–25			36–75	Report
9 Jan	19:30	Italy	3–0	Finland	25–13	25–18	25–20			75–51	Report
10 Jan	16:00	France	3–0	Finland	25–16	32–30	25–21			82–67	Report
10 Jan	18:30	Norway	0–3	Italy	12–25	6–25	10–25			28–75	Report
11 Jan	16:00	Finland	3–0	Norway	25–9	25–18	25–12			75–39	Report
11 Jan	18:30	France	2–3	Italy	25–22	25–14	17–25	14–25	12–15	93–101	Report

=== Pool B ===
- Venue: Audentes Sports Hall, Tallinn, Estonia
- All times are Eastern European Time (UTC+02:00).

Pos	Team	Pld	W	L	Pts	SW	SL	SR	SPW	SPL	SPR	Qualification
1	Turkey	3	2	1	7	8	4	2.000	279	241	1.158	Qualification phase 2
2	Greece	3	2	1	6	8	6	1.333	317	309	1.026	
3	Croatia	3	2	1	5	7	5	1.400	268	209	1.282	
4	Estonia	3	0	3	0	1	9	0.111	194	251	0.773	

Date	Time		Score		Set 1	Set 2	Set 3	Set 4	Set 5	Total	Report
9 Jan	15:30	Greece	2–3	Croatia	27–25	26–24	21–25	17–25	12–15	103–114	Report
9 Jan	18:00	Estonia	0–3	Turkey	18–25	17–25	14–25			49–75	Report
10 Jan	15:30	Croatia	1–3	Turkey	20–25	25–22	17–25	16–25		78–97	Report
10 Jan	18:00	Greece	3–1	Estonia	21–25	25–15	29–27	25–21		100–88	Report
11 Jan	15:30	Turkey	2–3	Greece	23–25	26–24	18–25	26–24	14–16	107–114	Report
11 Jan	18:00	Croatia	3–0	Estonia	25–19	25–14	26–24			76–57	Report

=== Pool C ===
- Venue: Polyvalent Hall, Bucharest, Romania
- All times are Eastern European Time (UTC+02:00).

Pos	Team	Pld	W	L	Pts	SW	SL	SR	SPW	SPL	SPR	Qualification
1	Russia	3	3	0	9	9	1	9.000	249	154	1.617	Qualification phase 2
2	Germany	3	2	1	6	6	4	1.500	227	208	1.091	
3	Israel	3	1	2	3	4	6	0.667	187	238	0.786	
4	Romania	3	0	3	0	1	9	0.111	189	252	0.750	

Date	Time		Score		Set 1	Set 2	Set 3	Set 4	Set 5	Total	Report
9 Jan	16:00	Israel	1–3	Germany	14–25	19–25	25–23	19–25		77–98	Report
9 Jan	18:30	Romania	1–3	Russia	26–24	12–25	9–25	21–25		68–99	Report
10 Jan	16:00	Germany	0–3	Russia	13–25	20–25	18–25			51–75	Report
10 Jan	18:30	Israel	3–0	Romania	25–23	25–22	25–20			75–65	Report
11 Jan	16:00	Russia	3–0	Israel	25–11	25–12	25–12			75–35	Report
11 Jan	18:30	Germany	3–0	Romania	25–15	28–26	25–15			78–56	Report

=== Pool D ===
- Venue: Centralny Osrodek Sportu, Szczyrk, Poland
- All times are Central European Time (UTC+01:00).

Pos	Team	Pld	W	L	Pts	SW	SL	SR	SPW	SPL	SPR	Qualification
1	Poland	3	3	0	9	9	0	MAX	226	145	1.559	Qualification phase 2
2	Belgium	3	2	1	6	6	3	2.000	197	177	1.113	
3	Latvia	3	1	2	3	3	6	0.500	177	218	0.812	
4	Netherlands	3	0	3	0	0	9	0.000	171	231	0.740	

Date	Time		Score		Set 1	Set 2	Set 3	Set 4	Set 5	Total	Report
9 Jan	16:00	Belgium	3–0	Latvia	25–14	25–20	25–19			75–53	Report
9 Jan	18:30	Netherlands	0–3	Poland	23–25	14–25	18–25			55–75	Report
10 Jan	16:00	Latvia	0–3	Poland	12–25	20–25	11–25			43–75	Report
10 Jan	18:30	Belgium	3–0	Netherlands	25–19	25–14	25–15			75–48	Report
11 Jan	16:00	Poland	3–0	Belgium	26–24	25–19	25–14			76–57	Report
11 Jan	18:30	Latvia	3–0	Netherlands	25–16	26–24	30–28			81–68	Report

=== Pool E ===
- Venue: Sportovní hala SSK, Tišnov, Czech Republic
- All times are Central European Time (UTC+01:00).

Pos	Team	Pld	W	L	Pts	SW	SL	SR	SPW	SPL	SPR	Qualification
1	Czech Republic	3	3	0	9	9	0	MAX	229	168	1.363	Qualification phase 2
2	Bulgaria	3	2	1	5	6	5	1.200	248	250	0.992	
3	Austria	3	1	2	4	5	7	0.714	259	263	0.985	
4	Denmark	3	0	3	0	1	9	0.111	198	253	0.783	

Date	Time		Score		Set 1	Set 2	Set 3	Set 4	Set 5	Total	Report
8 Jan	15:00	Austria	2–3	Bulgaria	25–15	27–25	23–25	27–29	8–15	110–109	Report
8 Jan	18:00	Czech Republic	3–0	Denmark	25–17	29–27	25–10			79–54	Report
9 Jan	15:00	Bulgaria	3–0	Denmark	25–20	25–20	27–25			77–65	Report
9 Jan	18:00	Austria	0–3	Czech Republic	22–25	19–25	11–25			52–75	Report
10 Jan	15:00	Denmark	1–3	Austria	11–25	20–25	25–22	23–25		79–97	Report
10 Jan	18:00	Bulgaria	0–3	Czech Republic	19–25	20–25	23–25			62–75	Report

== Qualification phase 2 ==
=== Pool G ===
- Venue: Ruma, Serbia

Pos	Team	Pld	W	L	Pts	SW	SL	SR	SPW	SPL	SPR	Qualification
1	Serbia	3	2	1	7	8	3	2.667	244	219	1.114	2015 FIVB Volleyball Women's U20 World Championship
2	Turkey	3	2	1	6	6	4	1.500	226	206	1.097	
3	France	3	2	1	5	6	5	1.200	241	214	1.126	
4	Czech Republic	3	0	3	0	1	9	0.111	176	248	0.710	

Date	Time		Score		Set 1	Set 2	Set 3	Set 4	Set 5	Total	Report
15 May	16:00	Czech Republic	1–3	Turkey	18–25	25–23	19–25	12–25		74–98	Report
15 May	18:30	Serbia	2–3	France	17–25	25–23	25–21	19–25	8–15	94–109	Report
16 May	16:00	Turkey	3–0	France	25–19	25–23	25–15			75–57	Report
16 May	18:30	Czech Republic	0–3	Serbia	22–25	16–25	19–25			57–75	Report
17 May	16:00	France	3–0	Czech Republic	25–18	25–14	25–13			75–45	Report
17 May	18:30	Turkey	0–3	Serbia	10–25	20–25	23–25			53–75	Report

=== Pool H ===
- Venue: Anapa, Russia

Pos	Team	Pld	W	L	Pts	SW	SL	SR	SPW	SPL	SPR	Qualification
1	Russia	3	3	0	8	9	3	3.000	280	225	1.244	2015 FIVB Volleyball Women's U20 World Championship
2	Italy	3	2	1	7	8	5	1.600	292	285	1.025	
3	Slovenia	3	1	2	2	4	8	0.500	241	275	0.876	
4	Poland	3	0	3	1	4	9	0.444	277	305	0.908	

Date	Time		Score		Set 1	Set 2	Set 3	Set 4	Set 5	Total	Report
14 May	16:00	Poland	1–3	Italy	25–27	21–25	26–24	13–25		85–101	Report
14 May	18:30	Russia	3–0	Slovenia	25–16	25–11	25–15			75–42	Report
15 May	16:00	Italy	3–1	Slovenia	17–25	26–24	25–22	25–19		93–90	Report
15 May	18:30	Poland	1–3	Russia	25–19	21–25	24–26	15–25		85–95	Report
16 May	16:00	Slovenia	3–2	Poland	25–27	19–25	25–21	25–22	15–12	109–107	Report
16 May	18:30	Italy	2–3	Russia	14–25	25–21	26–24	23–25	10–15	98–110	Report
