= 2025 Women's Pan-American Volleyball Cup =

Volleyball tournament

Tournament details
- Host country: Mexico
- Dates: 3–10 August
- Teams: 10
- Venue: 1 (in 1 host city)

Final positions
- Champions: Dominican Republic (7th title)
- Runners-up: Colombia
- Third place: Puerto Rico
- Fourth place: Mexico

Tournament statistics
- Matches played: 31
- Attendance: 25,300 (816 per match)

The 2025 Women's Pan-American Volleyball Cup was the 22nd edition of the annual women's volleyball tournament. It was held at the Auditorio Multifuncional Unidad Deportiva Morelos in Colima, Mexico from 3–10 August 2025.

The competition awards berths to the 2026 Women's Pan American Cup, the 2026 NORCECA Women's Championship, the 2026 Central American and Caribbean Games, and the 2027 Pan American Games.

Dominican Republic won their record seventh gold medal after defeating Colombia by 3–0 in the final. Puerto Rico defeated the hosts Mexico to claim the bronze medal. Gaila González of the Dominican Republic was the most valuable player.

== Pool composition ==
Pool A	Pool B
Cuba; Costa Rica; Mexico; Peru; Puerto Rico	Canada; Colombia; Dominican Republic; Trinidad and Tobago; Venezuela

== Preliminary round ==
=== Pool A ===
Pos	Team	Pld	W	L	Pts	SPW	SPL	SPR	SW	SL	SR	Qualification
1	Puerto Rico	4	3	1	14	356	300	1.187	10	5	2.000	Semifinals
2	Mexico	4	3	1	14	367	318	1.154	10	5	2.000	Quarterfinals
3	Peru	4	3	1	12	325	313	1.038	9	6	1.500	Quarterfinals
4	Cuba	4	1	3	10	373	353	1.057	8	9	0.889	Classification 7/10
5	Costa Rica	4	0	4	0	163	300	0.543	0	12	0.000	Classification 7/10

Source: NORCECA

Date	Time		Score		Set 1	Set 2	Set 3	Set 4	Set 5	Total	Report
3 Aug	18:00	Peru	3–2	Cuba	16–25	25–23	22–25	25–21	15–11	103–105	P2P3
3 Aug	20:00	Mexico	3–0	Costa Rica	25–13	25–10	25–17			75–40	P2P3
4 Aug	16:00	Costa Rica	0–3	Puerto Rico	17–25	16–25	8–25			41–75	P2P3
4 Aug	20:00	Mexico	1–3	Peru	25–21	21–25	23–25	21–25		90–96	P2P3
5 Aug	14:00	Peru	3–0	Costa Rica	25–14	25–16	25–13			75–43	P2P3
5 Aug	18:00	Cuba	2–3	Puerto Rico	27–25	21–25	25–21	21–25	12–15	106–111	P2P3
6 Aug	16:00	Peru	0–3	Puerto Rico	14–25	23–25	14–25			51–75	P2P3
6 Aug	20:00	Mexico	3–1	Cuba	22–25	25–18	25–18	28–26		100–87	P2P3
7 Aug	14:00	Cuba	3–0	Costa Rica	25–10	25–13	25–16			75–39	P2P3
7 Aug	20:00	Mexico	3–1	Puerto Rico	25–22	25–20	22–25	30–28		102–95	P2P3

=== Pool B ===
Pos	Team	Pld	W	L	Pts	SPW	SPL	SPR	SW	SL	SR	Qualification
1	Dominican Republic	4	4	0	17	354	264	1.341	12	3	4.000	Semifinals
2	Colombia	4	3	1	16	309	247	1.251	10	3	3.333	Quarterfinals
3	Venezuela	4	2	2	8	279	299	0.933	6	8	0.750	Quarterfinals
4	Canada	4	1	3	9	328	325	1.009	7	9	0.778	Classification 7/10
5	Trinidad and Tobago	4	0	4	0	165	300	0.550	0	12	0.000	Classification 7/10

Source: NORCECA

Date	Time		Score		Set 1	Set 2	Set 3	Set 4	Set 5	Total	Report
3 Aug	16:00	Colombia	3–0	Canada	25–16	25–15	25–22			75–53	P2P3
3 Aug	22:00	Dominican Republic	3–0	Trinidad and Tobago	25–9	25–15	25–11			75–35	P2P3
4 Aug	14:00	Colombia	3–0	Trinidad and Tobago	25–13	25–18	25–11			75–42	P2P3
4 Aug	18:00	Dominican Republic	3–0	Venezuela	25–18	25–10	25–21			75–49	P2P3
5 Aug	16:00	Canada	2–3	Venezuela	25–12	21–25	23–25	26–24	9–15	104–101	P2P3
5 Aug	20:00	Dominican Republic	3–1	Colombia	23–25	25–20	25–23	25–16		98–84	P2P3
6 Aug	14:00	Trinidad and Tobago	0–3	Canada	13–25	17–25	13–25			43–75	P2P3
6 Aug	18:00	Colombia	3–0	Venezuela	25–15	25–23	25–16			75–54	P2P3
7 Aug	16:00	Venezuela	3–0	Trinidad and Tobago	25–17	25–16	25–12			75–45	P2P3
7 Aug	18:00	Dominican Republic	3–2	Canada	25–19	15–25	25–14	26–28	15–10	106–96	P2P3

== Final round ==
=== Championship bracket ===
Quarterfinals
A2	Mexico	3
B3	Venezuela	1
B2	Colombia	3
A3	Peru	0

Semifinals
B1	Dominican Republic	3
A2	Mexico	1
A1	Puerto Rico	0
B2	Colombia	3

Final
B1	Dominican Republic	3
B2	Colombia	0
3rd place
A2	Mexico	1
A1	Puerto Rico	3

=== Classification 7/10 ===
Date	Time		Score		Set 1	Set 2	Set 3	Set 4	Set 5	Total	Report
8 Aug	14:00	Cuba	3–0	Trinidad and Tobago	25–8	25–14	25–13			75–35	P2P3
8 Aug	16:00	Canada	3–1	Costa Rica	22–25	26–24	25–20	25–17		98–86	P2P3

=== Quarterfinals ===
Date	Time		Score		Set 1	Set 2	Set 3	Set 4	Set 5	Total	Report
8 Aug	18:00	Colombia	3–0	Peru	25–21	25–20	25–20			75–61	P2P3
8 Aug	20:00	Mexico	3–1	Venezuela	28–26	25–23	20–25	25–12		98–86	P2P3

=== Final classification 9/10 ===
Date	Time		Score		Set 1	Set 2	Set 3	Set 4	Set 5	Total	Report
9 Aug	14:00	Trinidad and Tobago	1–3	Costa Rica	20–25	25–23	15–25	21–25		81–98	P2P3

=== Final classification 7/8 ===
Date	Time		Score		Set 1	Set 2	Set 3	Set 4	Set 5	Total	Report
9 Aug	16:00	Cuba	3–1	Canada	21–25	25–20	25–22	25–19		96–86	P2P3

=== Semifinals ===
Date	Time		Score		Set 1	Set 2	Set 3	Set 4	Set 5	Total	Report
9 Aug	18:00	Puerto Rico	0–3	Colombia	23–25	17–25	17–25			57–75	P2P3
9 Aug	20:00	Dominican Republic	3–1	Mexico	28–30	25–17	25–18	25–21		103–86	P2P3

=== Final classification 5/6 ===
Date	Time		Score		Set 1	Set 2	Set 3	Set 4	Set 5	Total	Report
10 Aug	13:30	Venezuela	3–2	Peru	18–25	25–23	19–25	25–20	15–12	102–105	P2P3

=== 3rd place match ===
Date	Time		Score		Set 1	Set 2	Set 3	Set 4	Set 5	Total	Report
10 Aug	15:30	Mexico	1–3	Puerto Rico	25–14	20–25	19–25	20–25		84–89	P2P3

=== Final ===
Date	Time		Score		Set 1	Set 2	Set 3	Set 4	Set 5	Total	Report
10 Aug	17:30	Dominican Republic	3–0	Colombia	25–21	29–27	25–22			79–70	P2P3

== Final standing ==
Rank	Team
1st place, gold medalist(s)	Dominican Republic
2nd place, silver medalist(s)	Colombia
3rd place, bronze medalist(s)	Puerto Rico
4	Mexico
5	Venezuela
6	Peru
7	Cuba
8	Canada
9	Costa Rica
10	Trinidad and Tobago

2025 Women's Pan-American Cup champions

Dominican Republic
7th title

14-woman roster
Yaneirys Rodríguez, Vielka Peralta, Brenda Castillo, Angélica Hinojosa, Geraldine González, Yokaty Pérez, Massiel Matos,
Madeline Guillén, Yonkaira Peña, Camila de la Rosa, Brayelin Martínez, Jineiry Martínez, Samaret Caraballo and Gaila González
Head coach
Marcos Kwiek

== Individual awards ==
- Most valuable player
  Gaila González (DOM)
- Best setter
  Argentina Ung (MEX)
- Best outside hitters
  Ana Karina Olaya (COL)
  Laura Grajales (COL)
- Best middle blockers
  Laura Suárez (CUB)
  Geraldine González (DOM)
- Best opposite
  Sofía Maldonado (MEX)
- Best scorer
  Sofía Maldonado (MEX)
- Best server
  Sandra Ostos (PER)
- Best libero
  Esmeralda Sánchez (PER)
- Best digger
  Esmeralda Sánchez (PER)
- Best receiver
  Esmeralda Sánchez (PER)

== See also ==
- 2025 Men's Pan-American Volleyball Cup
