= Volleyball at the 2019 Pan American Games – Women's tournament =

Volleyball – Women's tournament at the 2019 Pan American Games
- Venue: Callao Sports Center
- Dates: 7–11 August
- Competitors: 96 from 8 nations

Medalists
Gold medal	Dominican Republic
Silver medal	Colombia
Bronze medal	Argentina

The women's tournament of volleyball at the 2019 Pan American Games in Lima, Peru took place from 7 August to 11 August. All games were held at the Callao Sports Center. The defending champions were the United States. The Dominican Republic team took the gold, Columbia took silver, and Argentina came in third place.

== Qualification ==
A total of eight teams qualified to compete at the games.

Event	Dates	Location	Vacancies	Qualified
Host Nation	—	—	1	Peru
2018 Women's Pan-American Volleyball Cup	8–14 July	(Dominican Republic) Santo Domingo	5	United States; Dominican Republic; Canada; Brazil; Colombia
North American Qualification Tournament	4–6 January 2019	(Puerto Rico) San Juan	1	Puerto Rico
FIVB World Rankings	-	-	1	Argentina
Total			8	

== Results ==
=== Preliminary round ===
==== Group A ====
Pos	Team	Pld	W	L	Pts	SW	SL	SR	SPW	SPL	SPR	Qualification
1	Dominican Republic	3	3	0	14	9	1	9.000	252	212	1.189	Semifinals
2	Colombia	3	2	1	9	7	5	1.400	289	274	1.055	Semifinals
3	Peru (H)	3	1	2	5	4	7	0.571	239	252	0.948	5th–6th place match
4	Canada	3	0	3	2	2	9	0.222	224	266	0.842	7th–8th place match

Source: Lima 2019
(H) Host

7 August 2019; 18:30	Dominican Republic	3–1	Colombia	Callao Sports Center; Referees: Josmer Pérez Broche (FIV), Karina Rene (ARG)
7 August 2019; 18:30	(26–24, 27–25, 22–25, 27–25); P2 P3			Callao Sports Center; Referees: Josmer Pérez Broche (FIV), Karina Rene (ARG)

7 August 2019; 20:30	Peru	3–1	Canada	Callao Sports Center; Referees: Héctor Ortiz (PUR), Jediel Hosana de Carvalho (BRA)
7 August 2019; 20:30	(25–17, 25–21, 22–25, 25–18); P2			Callao Sports Center; Referees: Héctor Ortiz (PUR), Jediel Hosana de Carvalho (BRA)

8 August 2019; 18:30	Dominican Republic	3–0	Canada	Callao Sports Center
8 August 2019; 18:30	(25–16, 25–22, 25–23); P2 P3			Callao Sports Center

8 August 2019; 20:30	Peru	1–3	Colombia	Callao Sports Center
8 August 2019; 20:30	(25–21, 22–25, 21–25, 22–25); P2 P3			Callao Sports Center

9 August 2019; 18:30	Colombia	3–1	Canada	Callao Sports Center
9 August 2019; 18:30	(25–18, 25–19, 19–25, 25–20); P2 P3			Callao Sports Center

9 August 2019; 20:30	Peru	0–3	Dominican Republic	Callao Sports Center
9 August 2019; 20:30	(19–25, 16–25, 17–25); P2 P3			Callao Sports Center

==== Group B ====
Pos	Team	Pld	W	L	Pts	SW	SL	SR	SPW	SPL	SPR	Qualification
1	Brazil	3	2	1	10	6	3	2.000	215	182	1.181	Semifinals
2	Argentina	3	2	1	9	7	5	1.400	266	256	1.039	Semifinals
3	Puerto Rico	3	1	2	6	5	7	0.714	238	268	0.888	5th–6th place match
4	United States	3	1	2	5	5	8	0.625	259	272	0.952	7th–8th place match

Source: Lima 2019

7 August 2019; 13:00	Brazil	3–0	Puerto Rico	Callao Sports Center
7 August 2019; 13:00	(25–16, 25–16, 25–15); P2 P3			Callao Sports Center

7 August 2019; 15:00	United States	2–3	Argentina	Callao Sports Center; Referees: Misael Galindo Reyez (COL), Andrew Robb (CAN)
7 August 2019; 15:00	(17–25, 17–25, 25–20, 25–18, 10–15); P2 P3			Callao Sports Center; Referees: Misael Galindo Reyez (COL), Andrew Robb (CAN)

8 August 2019; 13:00	Brazil	0–3	Argentina	Callao Sports Center; Referees: Andrew Robb (CAN), James Juscamaita (PER)
8 August 2019; 13:00	(23–25, 19–25, 23–25); P2 P3			Callao Sports Center; Referees: Andrew Robb (CAN), James Juscamaita (PER)

8 August 2019; 15:00	United States	3–2	Puerto Rico	Callao Sports Center; Referees: Jediel de Carvalho (BRA), Rocio Huarcaya (PER)
8 August 2019; 15:00	(25–19, 19–25, 21–25, 25–16, 15–9); P2 P3			Callao Sports Center; Referees: Jediel de Carvalho (BRA), Rocio Huarcaya (PER)

9 August 2019; 13:00	United States	0–3	Brazil	Callao Sports Center
9 August 2019; 13:00	(21–25, 22–25, 17–25); P2 P3			Callao Sports Center

9 August 2019; 15:00	Puerto Rico	3–1	Argentina	Callao Sports Center
9 August 2019; 15:00	(21–25, 25–16, 26–24, 25–23); P2 P3			Callao Sports Center

=== Placement 5th–8th ===
7th place
10 August
Canada	0
United States	3

5th place
10 August
Peru	2
Puerto Rico	3

==== 7th–8th place match ====
10 August 2019; 13:00	Canada	0–3	United States	Callao Sports Center
10 August 2019; 13:00	(16–25, 14–25, 23–25); P2 P3			Callao Sports Center

==== 5th–6th place match ====
10 August 2019; 15:00	Peru	2–3	Puerto Rico	Callao Sports Center
10 August 2019; 15:00	(25–22, 18–25, 20–25, 25–15, 13–15); P2 P3			Callao Sports Center

=== Placement 1st–4th ===
Semifinals
Brazil	2
Colombia	3
Dominican Republic	3
Argentina	1

Gold medal match
Colombia	1
Dominican Republic	3
Bronze medal match
Brazil	0
Argentina	3

==== Semifinals ====
10 August 2019; 18:30	Brazil	2–3	Colombia	Callao Sports Center
10 August 2019; 18:30	(25–22, 27–25, 14–25, 26–28, 9–15); P2 P3			Callao Sports Center

10 August 2019; 20:30	Dominican Republic	3–1	Argentina	Callao Sports Center; Referees: Héctor Ortiz (PUR), James Juscamaita (PER)
10 August 2019; 20:30	(25–18, 26–28, 25–13, 25–21); P2 P3			Callao Sports Center; Referees: Héctor Ortiz (PUR), James Juscamaita (PER)

==== Bronze medal match ====
11 August 2019; 9:00	Brazil	0–3	Argentina	Callao Sports Center; Referees: Yuri Ramírez (DOM), Misael Galindo (COL)
11 August 2019; 9:00	(24–26, 20–25, 21–25); P2 P3			Callao Sports Center; Referees: Yuri Ramírez (DOM), Misael Galindo (COL)

==== Gold medal match ====
11 August 2019; 11:00	Colombia	1–3	Dominican Republic	Callao Sports Center
11 August 2019; 11:00	(20–25, 25–19, 25–27, 16–25); P2 P3			Callao Sports Center

== Final standings ==
Rank	Team
1st place, gold medalist(s)	Dominican Republic
2nd place, silver medalist(s)	Colombia
3rd place, bronze medalist(s)	Argentina
4	Brazil
5	Puerto Rico
6	Peru
7	United States
8	Canada

== Awards ==
- Most valuable player
  - Bethania de la Cruz (DOM)
- Best setter
  - Victoria Mayer (ARG)
- Best outside hitters
  - Bethania de la Cruz (DOM)
  - Brayelin Martínez (DOM)
- Best middle blockers
  - Jineiry Martínez (DOM)
  - Lisvel Eve (DOM)
- Best opposite
  - Lucía Fresco (ARG)
- Best libero
  - Camila Gómez (COL)
