= Universidad APEC =

Coordinates: 18.4736°N 69.9136°W

Universidad Acción Pro Educación y Cultura
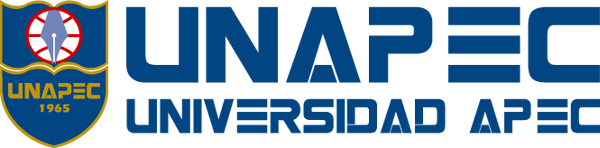
- Motto: “Por un mundo mejor” (AD MELIOREM MUNDUM)
- Type: Private
- Established: 1965; 60 years ago
- Rector: Erik Perez Vega
- Administrative staff: 500+
- Undergraduates: 8,800
- Postgraduates: 1,500
- Address: Av. Máximo Gómez #72, Santo Domingo, Dominican Republic
- Website: https://www.unapec.edu.do
- Location in the Dominican Republic

Universidad APEC (Universidad Acción Pro-Educación y Cultura) (UNAPEC) is a private university located in Santo Domingo, Dominican Republic. It was founded in 1965 under the name of Instituto de Estudios Superiores (Institute of Higher Studies). Management, Spanish and Bilingual Executive Secretarial Science, and Accounting, were the first majors offered by this university.

In 1968, the government of the Dominican Republic granted APEC accreditation as a university with the right to award higher education degrees. The university changed its name to the current one (Universidad APEC) on August 11, 1983; such change having been approved by the Dominican government in 1985.

== University's Board of Trustees ==
- Roberto Rodríguez Estrella-President
- Antonio Alma Iglesias- Vice-president
- Cristina Aguiar - Secretary
- Pedro Pablo Cabral - Treasurer
- Dr. Franklyn Holguín Haché - Ex Officio Director

== Schools and Colleges ==
- Accounting
- Arts and Communication
- Computer Science
- Economic and Entrepreneurial Sciences
- Engineering and Technology
- Languages
- Law
- Management
- Marketing
- Tourism
