= Fernanda Bañuelos =

Mexican volleyball player (born 1997)

Personal information
- Nationality: Mexican
- Born: 19 March 1997 (age 29)
- Height: 184 cm (6 ft 0 in)
- Weight: 70 kg (154 lb)
- Spike: 303 cm (119 in)
- Block: 285 cm (112 in)

Career
Years	Teams
2015	Baja California

National team
2015	Mexico

Fernanda Bañuelos (born 19 March 1997) is a Mexican female volleyball player. She is part of the Mexico women's national volleyball team.

She participated in the 2015 FIVB Volleyball World Grand Prix. On club level she played for Baja California in 2015.
