= Yokaty Pérez =

Dominican Republic volleyball player

Personal information
- Full name: Yokaty Perez Flores
- Nationality: Dominican
- Born: 6 August 1998 (age 28) Santo Domingo
- Home town: Santo Domingo
- Height: 1.78 m (5 ft 10 in)
- Weight: 79 kg (174 lb)
- Spike: 291 cm (115 in)
- Block: 257 cm (101 in)

Volleyball information
- Number: 12

Career
- Years: Team
- –: Los Cachorros
Honours
Women's volleyball
Representing the Dominican Republic
Pan-American Cup
Gold medal – first place	2025 Colima	Team
Pan American Games
Gold medal – first place	2023 Santiago	Team
Bolivarian Games
Gold medal – first place	2017 Santa Marta	Team

Yokaty Perez Flores (born 6 August 1998 in Santo Domingo) is a volleyball player from the Dominican Republic.

She played the 2018 FIVB Volleyball Women's Nations League, and the 2017 FIVB Volleyball Women's U23 World Championship.

== Clubs ==
- (Dominican Republic) Los Cachorros (2018)
