= 2013 FIVB Volleyball Women's U23 World Championship =

Campeonato Mundial de Femenino Sub-23 México 2013

Tournament details
- Host country: Mexico
- City: 2
- Dates: 5–12 October 2013
- Teams: 12
- Venues: 2

Final positions
- Champions: China (1st title)

Tournament awards
- MVP: Yao Di (CHN)

The 2013 FIVB Volleyball Women's U23 World Championship was held in Tijuana and Mexicali, Mexico, for seven days from 5 to 12 October 2013. This was the first edition of the tournament. China won the tournament and Yao Di was selected Most Valuable Player.

== Competition Formula ==
The competition format saw the 12 teams split into two pools of six teams playing in round robin format. The semifinals featured the top two teams from each pool. The FIVB Volleyball Women’s U23 World Championship featured two countries per confederation plus the host Mexico and the highest country in the world rankings not already selected by their confederation, in this case USA.

=== Qualified teams ===
Each Confederation was allowed to enter two teams into the competition. The qualification criteria were left to the discretion of each continental confederation.

Confederation	Method of Qualification	Vacancies	Qualified
	Host	1	Mexico
CSV	2012 U23 Pan-American Cup	2	Brazil; Argentina
NORCECA	2012 U23 Pan-American Cup	2	Dominican Republic; Cuba
CEV	FIVB Junior and Youth Ranking	2	Italy; Turkey
AVC	FIVB Senior Ranking	2	Japan; China
CAVB	FIVB Senior Ranking	1	Kenya
	Best ranked team	1	United States
	Wild Card	1	Germany*

- Germany was invited as Wild Card after Algeria from the African Confederation withdrew from the competition.

=== Pool Composition ===
First six teams were seeded according to their Senior World Ranking number as of October 2013, the other 6 were seeded by draw.

Pool A	Pool B
Mexico	Brazil
Japan	United States
Italy	China
Turkey	Germany
Dominican Republic	Kenya
Argentina	Cuba

== Venues ==
- High Performance Sports Center of Baja California, Tijuana, Mexico – Pool A and Final Round
- Auditorio del Estado, Mexicali, Mexico – Pool B and Final Round

== Preliminary round ==
=== Pool A ===
Pos	Team	Pld	W	L	Pts	SW	SL	SR	SPW	SPL	SPR	Qualification
1	Dominican Republic	5	4	1	13	14	4	3.500	421	333	1.264	Semifinals
2	Japan	5	5	0	12	15	7	2.143	476	433	1.099	Semifinals
3	Turkey	5	3	2	9	11	9	1.222	449	425	1.056	5th to 8th Classification
4	Italy	5	2	3	8	11	9	1.222	443	423	1.047	5th to 8th Classification
5	Argentina	5	1	4	3	3	12	0.250	291	366	0.795	
6	Mexico	5	0	5	0	2	15	0.133	318	418	0.761	

Date	Time		Score		Set 1	Set 2	Set 3	Set 4	Set 5	Total	Report
5 Oct	15:00	Italy	2–3	Turkey	31–29	25–16	24–26	22–25	15–17	117–113	P2P3
5 Oct	17:00	Dominican Republic	3–0	Argentina	25–14	25–18	25–16			75–48	P2P3
5 Oct	20:00	Mexico	1–3	Japan	19–25	13–25	25–20	15–25		72–95	P2P3
6 Oct	15:00	Japan	3–2	Italy	21–25	18–25	25–22	25–16	15–12	104–100	P2P3
6 Oct	17:00	Turkey	0–3	Dominican Republic	18–25	16–25	21–25			55–75	P2P3
6 Oct	19:00	Mexico	0–3	Argentina	24–26	21–25	21–25			66–76	P2P3
7 Oct	15:00	Argentina	0–3	Turkey	20–25	20–25	19–25			59–75	P2P3
7 Oct	17:00	Japan	3–2	Dominican Republic	15–25	25–22	17–25	25–17	15–9	97–98	P2P3
7 Oct	19:00	Mexico	0–3	Italy	19–25	15–25	20–25			54–75	P2P3
8 Oct	15:00	Argentina	0–3	Japan	19–25	16–25	19–25			54–75	P2P3
8 Oct	17:00	Dominican Republic	3–1	Italy	23–25	25–23	25–16	25–12		98–76	P2P3
8 Oct	19:00	Mexico	1–3	Turkey	7–25	25–22	25–18	25–19		82–84	P2P3
9 Oct	15:00	Italy	3–0	Argentina	25–18	25–19	25–17			75–54	P2P3
9 Oct	17:00	Turkey	2–3	Japan	25–23	22–25	24–26	25–16	13–15	109–105	P2P3
9 Oct	19:00	Mexico	0–3	Dominican Republic	15–25	21–25	21–25			57–75	P2P3

=== Pool B ===
Pos	Team	Pld	W	L	Pts	SW	SL	SR	SPW	SPL	SPR	Qualification
1	China	5	5	0	14	15	4	3.750	436	356	1.225	Semifinals
2	United States	5	4	1	11	14	7	2.000	443	376	1.178	Semifinals
3	Brazil	5	3	2	10	12	7	1.714	440	344	1.279	5th to 8th Classification
4	Germany	5	2	3	7	9	9	1.000	370	379	0.976	5th to 8th Classification
5	Cuba	5	1	4	3	4	12	0.333	346	391	0.885	
6	Kenya	5	0	5	0	0	15	0.000	186	375	0.496	

Date	Time		Score		Set 1	Set 2	Set 3	Set 4	Set 5	Total	Report
5 Oct	15:00	United States	3–0	Kenya	25–11	25–11	25–6			75–28	P2P3
5 Oct	17:00	China	3–1	Germany	25–21	25–22	18–25	25–19		93–87	P2P3
5 Oct	19:00	Brazil	3–1	Cuba	28–26	25–27	25–15	25–21		103–89	P2P3
6 Oct	15:00	Kenya	0–3	Germany	9–25	15–25	10–25			34–75	P2P3
6 Oct	17:00	United States	3–0	Cuba	25–20	25–19	25–21			75–60	P2P3
6 Oct	19:00	Brazil	1–3	China	16–25	25–21	22–25	23–25		86–96	P2P3
7 Oct	15:00	Kenya	0–3	Brazil	8–25	7–25	10–25			25–75	P2P3
7 Oct	17:00	United States	3–2	Germany	25–15	23–25	25–27	25–12	15–11	113–90	P2P3
7 Oct	19:00	Cuba	0–3	China	14–25	21–25	23–25			58–75	P2P3
8 Oct	15:00	Kenya	0–3	Cuba	19–25	23–25	21–25			63–75	P2P3
8 Oct	17:00	United States	2–3	China	15–25	25–18	25–14	19–25	5–15	89–97	P2P3
8 Oct	19:00	Germany	0–3	Brazil	11–25	11–25	21–25			43–75	P2P3
9 Oct	15:00	China	3–0	Kenya	25–16	25–6	25–14			75–36	P2P3
9 Oct	17:00	Germany	3–0	Cuba	25–22	25–22	25–20			75–64	P2P3
9 Oct	19:00	United States	3–2	Brazil	25–20	16–25	10–25	25–22	15–9	91–101	P2P3

== Final round ==
=== 5th to 8th bracket ===
Semifinals
Turkey	3
Germany	0
Brazil	0
Italy	3

5th place
Turkey	3
Italy	0
7th place
Germany	1
Brazil	3

=== Classification 5th and 8th ===
Date	Time		Score		Set 1	Set 2	Set 3	Set 4	Set 5	Total	Report
Oct 11	12:00	Turkey	3–0	Germany	25–13	25–13	25–19			75–45	P2P3
Oct 11	14:00	Brazil	0–3	Italy	13–25	24–26	22–25			59–76	P2P3

=== Classification 7th ===
Date	Time		Score		Set 1	Set 2	Set 3	Set 4	Set 5	Total	Report
Oct 12	12:00	Germany	1–3	Brazil	20–25	17–25	25–20	15–25		77–95	P2P3

=== Classification 5th ===
Date	Time		Score		Set 1	Set 2	Set 3	Set 4	Set 5	Total	Report
Oct 12	14:00	Turkey	3–0	Italy	25–17	25–20	25–22			75–59	P2P3

=== Championship bracket ===
Semifinals
Dominican Republic	3
United States	0
China	3
Japan	0

Final
Dominican Republic	0
China	3
Third place
United States	1
Japan	3

=== Semifinals ===
Date	Time		Score		Set 1	Set 2	Set 3	Set 4	Set 5	Total	Report
Oct 11	17:00	Dominican Republic	3–0	United States	25–21	25–21	27–25			77–67	P2P3
Oct 11	19:00	China	3–0	Japan	27–25	26–24	25–13			78–62	P2P3

=== Bronze medal match ===
Date	Time		Score		Set 1	Set 2	Set 3	Set 4	Set 5	Total	Report
Oct 12	17:00	United States	1–3	Japan	16–25	25–20	11–25	19–25		71–95	P2P3

=== Gold medal match ===
Date	Time		Score		Set 1	Set 2	Set 3	Set 4	Set 5	Total	Report
Oct 12	19:00	Dominican Republic	0–3	China	21–25	20–25	24–26			65–76	P2P3

== Final standing ==
Rank	Team
1st place, gold medalist(s)	China
2nd place, silver medalist(s)	Dominican Republic
3rd place, bronze medalist(s)	Japan
4	United States
5	Turkey
6	Italy
7	Brazil
8	Germany
9	Cuba
10	Argentina
11	Mexico
12	Kenya

2013 Women's U23 World champions

China
1st title

12–woman Roster
Zhang Yichan, Yang Jie, Liu Yanhan, Yang Zhou, Zhang Xiaoya, Qiao Ting, Gu Xinwei, Wang Qi, Cheng Long, Yao Di (c), Wang Lin and Shan Danna
Head coach
Xu Jiande

== All-star team ==
- Most valuable player
  - Yao Di (CHN)
- Best setter
  - Yao Di (CHN)
- Best Outside Hitters
  - Brayelin Martinez (DOM)
  - Sarina Koga (JPN)
- Best Opposite
  - Jeoselyna Rodriguez (DOM)
- Best Middle Blockers
  - Yang Zhou (CHN)
  - Zhang Xiaoya (CHN)
- Best libero
  - Brenda Castillo (DOM)
