= Volleyball at the 2023 Pan American Games – Women's tournament =

Volleyball – Women's tournament at the 2023 Pan American Games
- Venue: Arena Parque O'Higgins
- Dates: 21–26 October
- Competitors: 96 from 8 nations

Medalists
Gold medal	Dominican Republic
Silver medal	Brazil
Bronze medal	Mexico

The women's volleyball tournament at the 2023 Pan American Games was the 18th edition of the volleyball event for women at the Pan American Games. It was held from October 21–26, 2023. All games were played at the Arena Parque O'Higgins in Santiago, Chile.

== Schedule ==
The schedule is as follows.

Legend
G	Group stage	¼	Quarter-finals	½	Semi-finals	B	Bronze medal match	F	Gold medal match

Sat 21	Sun 22	Mon 23	Tue 24	Thu 25	Fri 26	
G	G	G	¼	½	B	F

== Qualification ==
A total of eight women's teams qualified to compete at the games in each tournament. The host nation (Chile) qualified automatically, along with seven other teams in various qualifying tournaments.

Event	Dates	Location	Quota(s)	Qualified
Host Nation	—N/a	—N/a	1	Chile
2021 Pan-American Cup	13–19 September	(Dominican Republic) Santo Domingo	1	Dominican Republic
2021 Junior Pan American Games	1–5 December	(Colombia) Cali	2	Brazil; Mexico
CSV Qualifying Tournament	7–11 August 2022	(Argentina) San Juan	2	Argentina; Colombia
2023 Pan-American Cup	4–14 August	Puerto Rico	2	~~United States~~; Puerto Rico
Reallocation	–	–	1	Cuba
Total			8	

== Results ==
All times are in Chile Time (UTC−3).

=== Group A ===
Pos	Team	Pld	W	L	Pts	SPW	SPL	SPR	SW	SL	SR
1	Brazil	3	3	0	9	225	153	1.471	9	0	MAX
2	Argentina	3	2	1	6	218	208	1.048	6	4	1.500
3	Puerto Rico	3	1	2	3	212	221	0.959	4	6	0.667
4	Cuba	3	0	3	0	152	225	0.676	0	9	0.000

Source: Santiago 2023

21 October 2023; 10:30	Brazil	3–0	Cuba	Arena Parque O'Higgins, Santiago; Attendance: 8,000
21 October 2023; 10:30	(25–14, 25–16, 25–14); P2 P3			Arena Parque O'Higgins, Santiago; Attendance: 8,000

21 October 2023; 13:30	Puerto Rico	1–3	Argentina	Arena Parque O'Higgins, Santiago; Attendance: 8,000
21 October 2023; 13:30	(17–25, 18–25, 25–17, 19–25); P2 P3			Arena Parque O'Higgins, Santiago; Attendance: 8,000

22 October 2023; 10:30	Puerto Rico	3–0	Cuba	Arena Parque O'Higgins, Santiago; Attendance: 8,000
22 October 2023; 10:30	(25–20, 25–16, 25–18); P2 P3			Arena Parque O'Higgins, Santiago; Attendance: 8,000

22 October 2023; 13:30	Brazil	3–0	Argentina	Arena Parque O'Higgins, Santiago; Attendance: 9,000
22 October 2023; 13:30	(25–13, 25–20, 25–18); P2 P3			Arena Parque O'Higgins, Santiago; Attendance: 9,000

23 October 2023; 10:30	Brazil	3–0	Puerto Rico	Arena Parque O'Higgins, Santiago; Attendance: 5,260
23 October 2023; 10:30	(25–15, 25–22, 25–21); P2 P3			Arena Parque O'Higgins, Santiago; Attendance: 5,260

23 October 2023; 13:30	Argentina	3–0	Cuba	Arena Parque O'Higgins, Santiago; Attendance: 1,200
23 October 2023; 13:30	(25–23, 25–16, 25–15); P2 P3			Arena Parque O'Higgins, Santiago; Attendance: 1,200

=== Group B ===
Pos	Team	Pld	W	L	Pts	SPW	SPL	SPR	SW	SL	SR
1	Dominican Republic	3	3	0	9	225	149	1.510	9	0	MAX
2	Mexico	3	2	1	6	225	204	1.103	6	4	1.500
3	Chile	3	1	2	3	205	231	0.887	4	6	0.667
4	Colombia	3	0	3	0	158	229	0.690	0	9	0.000

Source: Santiago 2023

21 October 2023; 17:30	Colombia	0–3	Mexico	Arena Parque O'Higgins, Santiago; Attendance: 8,000
21 October 2023; 17:30	(22–25, 13–25, 14–25); P2 P3			Arena Parque O'Higgins, Santiago; Attendance: 8,000

21 October 2023; 20:30	Chile	0–3	Dominican Republic	Arena Parque O'Higgins, Santiago; Attendance: 8,000
21 October 2023; 20:30	(18–25, 17–25, 11–25); P2 P3			Arena Parque O'Higgins, Santiago; Attendance: 8,000

22 October 2023; 17:30	Dominican Republic	3–0	Mexico	Arena Parque O'Higgins, Santiago; Attendance: 12,000
22 October 2023; 17:30	(25–15, 25–17, 25–19); P2 P3			Arena Parque O'Higgins, Santiago; Attendance: 12,000

22 October 2023; 20:30	Chile	3–0	Colombia	Arena Parque O'Higgins, Santiago; Attendance: 12,000
22 October 2023; 20:30	(29–27, 25–23, 25–7); P2 P3			Arena Parque O'Higgins, Santiago; Attendance: 12,000

23 October 2023; 17:30	Dominican Republic	3–0	Colombia	Arena Parque O'Higgins, Santiago; Attendance: 8,000
23 October 2023; 17:30	(25–14, 25–18, 25–20); P2 P3			Arena Parque O'Higgins, Santiago; Attendance: 8,000

23 October 2023; 20:30	Chile	1–3	Mexico	Arena Parque O'Higgins, Santiago; Attendance: 9,000
23 October 2023; 20:30	(26–24, 21–25, 15–25, 18–25); P2 P3			Arena Parque O'Higgins, Santiago; Attendance: 9,000

== Elimination round ==
=== Championship bracket ===
Quarterfinals
A2	Argentina	3
B3	Chile	2
B2	Mexico	3
A3	Puerto Rico	0

Semifinals
B1	Dominican Republic	3
A2	Argentina	1
A1	Brazil	3
B2	Mexico	2

Final
B1	Dominican Republic	3
A1	Brazil	0
Third place
A2	Argentina	2
B2	Mexico	3

=== Quarterfinals ===
24 October 2023; 10:30	Mexico	3–0	Puerto Rico	Arena Parque O'Higgins, Santiago; Attendance: 3,412
24 October 2023; 10:30	(25–17, 25–17, 25–14); P2 P3			Arena Parque O'Higgins, Santiago; Attendance: 3,412

24 October 2023; 13:30	Argentina	3–2	Chile	Arena Parque O'Higgins, Santiago; Attendance: 6,000
24 October 2023; 13:30	(25–19, 25–9, 21–25, 23–25, 15–7); P2 P3			Arena Parque O'Higgins, Santiago; Attendance: 6,000

==== 5–8th place semifinals ====
25 October 2023; 10:30	Colombia	3–2	Puerto Rico	Arena Parque O'Higgins, Santiago; Attendance: 3,500
25 October 2023; 10:30	(19–25, 22–25, 25–22, 25–21, 15–8); P2 P3			Arena Parque O'Higgins, Santiago; Attendance: 3,500

25 October 2023; 13:30	Cuba	0–3	Chile	Arena Parque O'Higgins, Santiago; Attendance: 5,000
25 October 2023; 13:30	(15–25, 26–28, 17–25); P2 P3			Arena Parque O'Higgins, Santiago; Attendance: 5,000

=== Semifinals ===
25 October 2023; 17:30	Dominican Republic	3–1	Argentina	Arena Parque O'Higgins, Santiago; Attendance: 9,500
25 October 2023; 17:30	(16–25, 25–19, 25–20, 25–17); P2 P3			Arena Parque O'Higgins, Santiago; Attendance: 9,500

25 October 2023; 20:30	Brazil	3–2	Mexico	Arena Parque O'Higgins, Santiago; Attendance: 5,500
25 October 2023; 20:30	(25–17, 22–25, 27–25, 22–25, 15–13); P2 P3			Arena Parque O'Higgins, Santiago; Attendance: 5,500

=== Seventh place match ===
26 October 2023; 10:00	Puerto Rico	3–0	Cuba	Arena Parque O'Higgins, Santiago; Attendance: 4,000
26 October 2023; 10:00	(25–23, 26–24, 25–19); P2 P3			Arena Parque O'Higgins, Santiago; Attendance: 4,000

=== Fifth place match ===
26 October 2023; 13:00	Colombia	0–3	Chile	Arena Parque O'Higgins, Santiago; Attendance: 7,000
26 October 2023; 13:00	(21–25, 20–25, 17–25); P2 P3			Arena Parque O'Higgins, Santiago; Attendance: 7,000

=== Bronze medal match ===
26 October 2023; 17:00	Argentina	2–3	Mexico	Arena Parque O'Higgins, Santiago; Attendance: 14,500
26 October 2023; 17:00	(25–22, 23–25, 25–22, 18–25, 13–15); P2 P3			Arena Parque O'Higgins, Santiago; Attendance: 14,500

=== Gold medal match ===
26 October 2023; 20:00	Dominican Republic	3–0	Brazil	Arena Parque O'Higgins, Santiago; Attendance: 15,000
26 October 2023; 20:00	(26–24, 25–16, 25–19); P2 P3			Arena Parque O'Higgins, Santiago; Attendance: 15,000

== Final standings ==
Rank	Team
1st place, gold medalist(s)	Dominican Republic
2nd place, silver medalist(s)	Brazil
3rd place, bronze medalist(s)	Mexico
4	Argentina
5	Chile
6	Colombia
7	Puerto Rico
8	Cuba

== Awards ==
- Most valuable player
  - Niverka Marte (DOM)
- Best setter
  - Ivone Martínez (MEX)
- Best outside hitters
  - Brayelin Martínez (DOM)
  - Yonkaira Peña (DOM)
- Best middle blockers
  - Neira Ortiz (PUR)
  - Lorena Viezel (BRA)
- Best opposite
  - Sabrina Machado (BRA)
- Best libero
  - Camila Gómez (COL)
