= 2024 Women's U23 Pan-American Volleyball Cup =

Tournament details
- Host country: Mexico
- City: Xalapa
- Dates: 3–8 September
- Teams: 8
- Venue: 1 (in 1 host city)

Final positions
- Champions: Cuba (1st title)
- Runners-up: Dominican Republic
- Third place: Mexico
- Fourth place: Chile

Tournament awards
- MVP: (Cuba) Lisania Grafort
- Best Setter: (Dominican Republic) Ailyn Liberato
- Best OH: (Mexico) Marcela Herrera (Mexico) Michelle Lizárraga
- Best MB: (Chile) María Ignacia Nielsen (Cuba) Yensy Kindelan
- Best OPP: (Dominican Republic) Alondra Tapia
- Best Libero: (Costa Rica) Camila Arias

Tournament statistics
- Matches played: 22

The 2024 Women's U23 Pan-American Volleyball Cup, officially named 2024 Women U23 Panamerican Cup, was the seventh edition of the Women's U23 Pan-American Volleyball Cup, the bi-annual volleyball tournament organized by the Pan-American Volleyball Union (UPV) that brings together the NORCECA and Confederación Sudamericana de Voleibol (CSV) U23 women's national teams. It was held in Xalapa, Mexico from 3 to 8 September 2024.

The competition awarded two spots to the women's volleyball tournament at the 2025 Junior Pan American Games in Asunción, Paraguay. These two berths were only for the top two teams among the NORCECA teams, excluding Dominican Republic and Mexico, who had already qualified in the previous edition of the tournament.

Cuba won their first Women's U23 Pan-American Cup by beating the six-time defending champions Dominican Republic 3–1 in the final game. Mexico completed the podium after defeating Chile also by 3–1 score in the third-place match. Champions Cuba and sixth place Costa Rica qualified for the 2025 Junior Pan American Games.

== Participating teams ==
Up to a maximum of 8 national teams could qualify for the tournament as follows: the host nation, the top 4 teams in the NORCECA U23 Continental Ranking that confirmed their participation and the top 3 teams in the CSV U23 Continental Ranking that confirmed their participation. Eventually, there were 5 NORCECA teams and 2 CSV teams that confirmed their participation, with Honduras entering the tournament after the declination of the eligible teams needed to complete the line of 8 teams.

The following were the teams eligible to participate in the tournament (teams that confirmed their participation marked in bold and confederation ranking, if given, shown in brackets):

NORCECA (North, Central America and Caribbean Volleyball Confederation)

- **Dominican Republic** (1, holders)
- **Cuba** (2)
- **Mexico** (3, hosts)
- ~~Puerto Rico~~ (4)
- ~~Canada~~ (5)
- **Suriname** (6)
- **Costa Rica** (8)
- **Nicaragua** (20, not originally considered eligible)
- ~~United States~~ (no rank)

CSV (South American Volleyball Confederation)

- ~~Colombia~~
- ~~Argentina~~
- ~~Brazil~~
- **Peru**
- ~~Venezuela~~
- **Chile**

=== Squads ===
Each national team had to register a squad of 12 players. Players born on 1 January 2002 and onwards were eligible to compete in the tournament.

== Competition format ==
In the Pan-American Cups the competition format depends on the number of participating teams. With 8 teams, two pools of four teams each were formed. The pool standing procedure were as follows:

1. Number of matches won;
2. Match points;
  - Match won 3–0: 5 match points for the winner, 0 match points for the loser
  - Match won 3–1: 4 match points for the winner, 1 match point for the loser
  - Match won 3–2: 3 match points for the winner, 2 match points for the loser
3. Points ratio;
4. Sets ratio;
5. If the tie continues between two teams: result of the last match between the tied teams;
6. If the tie continues between three or more teams: a new classification would be made taking into consideration only the matches between involved teams.

The winners of each pool advanced directly to the semi-finals, while the runners-up and the third placed teams advanced to the quarter-finals.

=== Pools composition ===
Teams were distributed into two groups of six teams. As hosts, Mexico had the right to choose the group in which to be placed and were assigned to the head of its group (Group B). The remaining teams were distributed into the groups according to their position in the NORCECA and CSV Continental Rankings (as of 1 January 2024) and following the serpentine system, starting with the highest-ranked NORCECA team as head of the remaining group (Group A).

Pool A	Pool B
Dominican Republic	Mexico
Cuba	Peru
Chile	Suriname
Costa Rica	Nicaragua

Mexico also had the right to choose their first match in the preliminary round and propose the times and order of all matches.

== Preliminary round ==
All match times are local times, CT (UTC−6), as listed by NORCECA.

=== Group A ===
Pos	Team	Pld	W	L	Pts	SPW	SPL	SPR	SW	SL	SR	Qualification
1	Dominican Republic	3	3	0	14	246	184	1.337	9	1	9.000	Semi-finals
2	Cuba	3	2	1	9	235	211	1.114	6	4	1.500	Quarter-finals
3	Chile	3	1	2	7	230	257	0.895	5	6	0.833	Quarter-finals
4	Costa Rica	3	0	3	0	166	225	0.738	0	9	0.000	5th–8th semifinals

Source: NORCECA

Date	Time		Score		Set 1	Set 2	Set 3	Set 4	Set 5	Total	Report
3 Sep	14:00	Dominican Republic	3–0	Costa Rica	25–18	25–16	25–17			75–51	P2 P3
3 Sep	18:00	Cuba	3–1	Chile	19–25	25–23	27–25	25–13		96–86	P2 P3
4 Sep	14:00	Costa Rica	0–3	Cuba	16–25	20–25	14–25			50–75	P2 P3
4 Sep	18:00	Chile	1–3	Dominican Republic	25–21	11–25	20–25	13–25		69–96	P2 P3
5 Sep	14:00	Costa Rica	0–3	Chile	22–25	23–25	20–25			65–75	P2 P3
5 Sep	18:00	Dominican Republic	3–0	Cuba	25–22	25–22	25–20			75–64	P2 P3

=== Group B ===
Pos	Team	Pld	W	L	Pts	SPW	SPL	SPR	SW	SL	SR	Qualification
1	Mexico	3	3	0	15	225	140	1.607	9	0	MAX	Semi-finals
2	Peru	3	2	1	9	234	176	1.330	6	4	1.500	Quarter-finals
3	Nicaragua	3	1	2	6	188	219	0.858	4	6	0.667	Quarter-finals
4	Suriname	3	0	3	0	113	225	0.502	0	9	0.000	5th–8th semifinals

Source: NORCECA

Date	Time		Score		Set 1	Set 2	Set 3	Set 4	Set 5	Total	Report
3 Sep	16:00	Peru	3–1	Nicaragua	25–17	21–25	25–16	25–15		96–73	P2 P3
3 Sep	20:00	Mexico	3–0	Suriname	25–13	25–13	25–11			75–37	P2 P3
4 Sep	16:00	Peru	3–0	Suriname	25–5	25–10	25–13			75–28	P2 P3
4 Sep	20:00	Nicaragua	0–3	Mexico	10–25	17–25	13–25			40–75	P2 P3
5 Sep	16:00	Suriname	0–3	Nicaragua	21–25	12–25	15–25			48–75	P2 P3
5 Sep	20:00	Mexico	3–0	Peru	25–23	25–19	25–21			75–63	P2 P3

== Final round ==
=== Bracket ===
5th place match
Costa Rica	0
Peru	3
7th place match
Nicaragua	3
Suriname	0

5th–8th semi-finals
4B	Suriname	0
2B	Peru	3
4A	Costa Rica	3
3B	Nicaragua	0

Quarter-finals
2B	Peru	1
3A	Chile	3
2A	Cuba	3
3B	Nicaragua	0

Semi-finals
1A	Dominican Republic	3
3A	Chile	0
1B	Mexico	2
2A	Cuba	3

Final
Dominican Republic	1
Cuba	3
3rd place match
Chile	1
Mexico	3

=== Quarter-finals ===
Date	Time		Score		Set 1	Set 2	Set 3	Set 4	Set 5	Total	Report
6 Sep	16:00	Cuba	3–0	Nicaragua	25–17	26–24	25–16			76–57	P2 P3
6 Sep	18:00	Peru	1–3	Chile	25–21	18–25	21–25	19–25		83–96	P2 P3

=== 5th–8th Semi-finals ===
Date	Time		Score		Set 1	Set 2	Set 3	Set 4	Set 5	Total	Report
7 Sep	14:00	Costa Rica	3–0	Nicaragua	25–22	25–18	26–24			76–64	P2 P3
7 Sep	16:00	Suriname	0–3	Peru	20–25	14–25	15–25			49–75	P2 P3

=== Semi-finals ===
Date	Time		Score		Set 1	Set 2	Set 3	Set 4	Set 5	Total	Report
7 Sep	18:00	Dominican Republic	3–0	Chile	30–28	25–21	29–27			84–76	P2 P3
7 Sep	20:00	Mexico	2–3	Cuba	25–18	22–25	19–25	25–22	14–16	105–106	P2 P3

=== 7th place match ===
Date	Time		Score		Set 1	Set 2	Set 3	Set 4	Set 5	Total	Report
8 Sep	12:00	Nicaragua	3–0	Suriname	25–12	25–16	25–15			75–43	P2 P3

=== 5th place match ===
Date	Time		Score		Set 1	Set 2	Set 3	Set 4	Set 5	Total	Report
8 Sep	14:00	Costa Rica	0–3	Peru	15–25	21–25	20–25			56–75	P2 P3

=== 3rd place match ===
Date	Time		Score		Set 1	Set 2	Set 3	Set 4	Set 5	Total	Report
8 Sep	16:00	Chile	1–3	Mexico	25–20	23–25	15–25	13–25		76–95	P2 P3

=== Final ===
Date	Time		Score		Set 1	Set 2	Set 3	Set 4	Set 5	Total	Report
8 Sep	18:00	Dominican Republic	1–3	Cuba	24–26	25–22	21–25	20–25		90–98	P2 P3

== Final standing ==
Rank	Team
1st place, gold medalist(s)	Cuba
2nd place, silver medalist(s)	Dominican Republic
3rd place, bronze medalist(s)	Mexico
4	Chile
5	Peru
6	Costa Rica
7	Nicaragua
8	Suriname

2024 Women's U23 Pan-American Cup champions

Cuba
First title

Team Roster:

Lisania Grafort, Yensy Kindelan, Lianet García, Yalain De La Peña, Brenda Nold Ferrer, Alejandra Gómez, Yamilena Ruiz Pis (L), Edisleidys Reyes, Thainalien Castillo, Martha García, Whitney James (c), Lisbeysis Hernández.

Head coach: (Cuba) Leivis García

== Individual awards ==
The following individual awards were presented at the end of the tournament.

- Most valuable player (MVP)
  Lisania Grafort (CUB)
- Best setter
  Ailyn Liberato (DOM)
- Best outside spikers
  Marcela Herrera (MEX)
  Michelle Lizárraga (MEX)
- Best middle blockers
  María Ignacia Nielsen (CHI)
  Yensy Kindelan (CUB)
- Best opposite
  Alondra Tapia (DOM)
- Best libero
  Camila Arias (CRC)
- Best scorer
  Petra Schwartzman (CHI)
- Best digger
  Brissa Nieves (PER)
- Best receiver
  Camila Arias (CRC)
- Best server
  Marcela Herrera (MEX)
