= 2023 Women's U23 Pan-American Volleyball Cup =

Tournament details
- Host country: Mexico
- City: Hermosillo
- Dates: 18–23 July
- Teams: 8
- Venue: 1 (in 1 host city)

Final positions
- Champions: Dominican Republic (6th title)
- Runners-up: Mexico
- Third place: Argentina
- Fourth place: Peru

Tournament statistics
- Matches played: 22
- Attendance: 20,125 (915 per match)

The 2023 Women's U23 Pan-American Volleyball Cup was the sixth edition of the Women's U23 Pan-American Volleyball Cup, the bi-annual volleyball tournament organized by the Pan-American Volleyball Union (UPV) that brings together the NORCECA and Confederación Sudamericana de Voleibol (CSV) U23 women's national teams. It was held in Hermosillo, Mexico from 18 to 23 July 2023.

Dominican Republic were the five-time defending champions having won all the 5 previous editions. The Dominicans managed to retain the title and win their sixth in a row after defeating the hosts Mexico 3–1 in the final match, which was a rematch of the previous 2021 final. Argentina took the bronze medal by beating Peru 3–1 in the third-place match.

== Participating teams ==
Up to a maximum of 8 national teams could qualify for the tournament as follows: the host nation, the top 4 teams in the NORCECA U23 ranking that confirmed their participation and the top 3 teams in the CSV U23 ranking that confirmed their participation. Eventually, there were 5 NORCECA teams and 2 CSV teams that confirmed their participation, with Honduras entering the tournament after the declination of the eligible teams needed to complete the line of 8 teams.

The following were the teams eligible to participate in the tournament (teams that confirmed their participation marked in bold and confederation ranking, if given, shown in brackets):

NORCECA (North, Central America and Caribbean Volleyball Confederation)

- **Dominican Republic** (1, holders)
- **Cuba** (2)
- **Mexico** (3, hosts)
- ~~Puerto Rico~~ (4)
- ~~Suriname~~ (5)
- **Costa Rica** (6)
- **Honduras** (9, not originally considered eligible)
- **Canada** (no rank)
- ~~United States~~ (no rank)

CSV (South American Volleyball Confederation)

- ~~Colombia~~
- **Argentina**
- ~~Brazil~~
- **Peru**
- ~~Venezuela~~
- ~~Chile~~

=== Squads ===
Each national team had to register a squad of 12 players. Players born on 1 January 2001 and onwards were eligible to compete in the tournament.

== Competition format ==
In the Pan-American Cups the competition format depends on the number of participating teams. With 8 teams, two pools of four teams each were formed. The pool standing procedure were as follows:

1. Number of matches won;
2. Match points;
  - Match won 3–0: 5 match points for the winner, 0 match points for the loser
  - Match won 3–1: 4 match points for the winner, 1 match point for the loser
  - Match won 3–2: 3 match points for the winner, 2 match points for the loser
3. Points ratio;
4. Sets ratio;
5. If the tie continues between two teams: result of the last match between the tied teams;
6. If the tie continues between three or more teams: a new classification would be made taking into consideration only the matches between involved teams.

The winners of each pool advanced directly to the semi-finals, while the runners-up and the third placed teams advanced to the quarter-finals.

=== Pools composition ===
The teams were distributed into two pools following their positions on the NORCECA and CSV rankings.

| Pool A | Pool B |
|---|---|
| Dominican Republic | Mexico |
| Cuba | Argentina |
| Peru | Costa Rica |
| Canada | Honduras |

== Preliminary round ==
All match times are in MXT, Pacific time (UTC−7).

=== Group A ===
| Pos | Team | Pld | W | L | Pts | SPW | SPL | SPR | SW | SL | SR | Qualification |
|---|---|---|---|---|---|---|---|---|---|---|---|---|
| 1 | Dominican Republic | 3 | 3 | 0 | 14 | 248 | 203 | 1.222 | 9 | 1 | 9.000 | Semi-finals |
| 2 | Peru | 3 | 2 | 1 | 9 | 280 | 258 | 1.085 | 7 | 5 | 1.400 | Quarter-finals |
| 3 | Canada | 3 | 1 | 2 | 5 | 232 | 258 | 0.899 | 4 | 7 | 0.571 | Quarter-finals |
| 4 | Cuba | 3 | 0 | 3 | 2 | 232 | 273 | 0.850 | 2 | 9 | 0.222 | 5th–8th semifinals |

Source: NORCECA

| Date | Time | | Score | | Set 1 | Set 2 | Set 3 | Set 4 | Set 5 | Total | Report |
|---|---|---|---|---|---|---|---|---|---|---|---|
| 18 July | 14:00 | Cuba | 1–3 | Peru | 25–23 | 22–25 | 19–25 | 20–25 | | 86–98 | P2 P3 |
| 18 July | 18:00 | Dominican Republic | 3–0 | Canada | 26–24 | 25–18 | 25–15 | | | 76–57 | P2 P3 |
| 19 July | 14:00 | Canada | 3–1 | Cuba | 25–18 | 24–19 | 25–25 | 26–24 | | 100–86 | P2 P3 |
| 19 July | 18:00 | Peru | 1–3 | Dominican Republic | 23–25 | 20–25 | 25–22 | 19-25 | | 87–72 | P2 P3 |
| 20 July | 14:00 | Peru | 3–1 | Canada | 25–14 | 25–19 | 20–25 | 25–17 | | 95–75 | P2 P3 |
| 20 July | 18:00 | Dominican Republic | 3–0 | Cuba | 25–20 | 25–16 | 25–23 | | | 75–59 | P2 P3 |

=== Group B ===
| Pos | Team | Pld | W | L | Pts | SPW | SPL | SPR | SW | SL | SR | Qualification |
|---|---|---|---|---|---|---|---|---|---|---|---|---|
| 1 | Mexico | 3 | 3 | 0 | 13 | 251 | 189 | 1.328 | 9 | 2 | 4.500 | Semi-finals |
| 2 | Argentina | 3 | 2 | 1 | 12 | 254 | 177 | 1.435 | 8 | 3 | 2.667 | Quarter-finals |
| 3 | Costa Rica | 3 | 1 | 2 | 4 | 181 | 224 | 0.808 | 3 | 7 | 0.429 | Quarter-finals |
| 4 | Honduras | 3 | 0 | 3 | 1 | 152 | 248 | 0.613 | 1 | 9 | 0.111 | 5th–8th semifinals |

Source: NORCECA

| Date | Time | | Score | | Set 1 | Set 2 | Set 3 | Set 4 | Set 5 | Total | Report |
|---|---|---|---|---|---|---|---|---|---|---|---|
| 18 July | 16:00 | Argentina | 3–0 | Costa Rica | 26–24 | 25–18 | 25–15 | | | 76–57 | P2 P3 |
| 18 July | 20:00 | Mexico | 3–0 | Honduras | 26–11 | 25–13 | 25–14 | | | 76–38 | P2 P3 |
| 19 July | 16:00 | Honduras | 0–3 | Argentina | 16–25 | 13–25 | 11–25 | | | 40–75 | P2 P3 |
| 19 July | 20:00 | Costa Rica | 0–3 | Mexico | 11–25 | 15–25 | 21–25 | | | 47–75 | P2 P3 |
| 20 July | 16:00 | Honduras | 1–3 | Costa Rica | 25–23 | 16–25 | 14–25 | 19–25 | | 74–98 | P2 P3 |
| 20 July | 20:00 | Mexico | 3–2 | Argentina | 25–17 | 23–25 | 27–25 | 11–25 | 15–12 | 101–104 | P2 P3 |

== Final round ==
=== Bracket ===
5th place match
Canada | 3
Cuba | 0
7th place match
Honduras | 3
Costa Rica | 2

5th–8th semi-finals
B4 | Honduras | 0
A3 | Canada | 3
A4 | Cuba | 3
B3 | Costa Rica | 0

Quarter-finals
B2 | Argentina | 3
A3 | Canada | 0
A2 | Peru | 3
B3 | Costa Rica | 0

Semi-finals
A1 | Dominican Republic | 3
B2 | Argentina | 1
B1 | Mexico | 3
A2 | Peru | 0

Final
Dominican Republic | 3
Mexico | 1
3rd place match
Argentina | 3
Peru | 1

=== Quarter-finals ===
| Date | Time | | Score | | Set 1 | Set 2 | Set 3 | Set 4 | Set 5 | Total | Report |
|---|---|---|---|---|---|---|---|---|---|---|---|
| 21 July | 18:00 | Argentina | 3–0 | Canada | 25–19 | 25–18 | 25–18 | | | 75–55 | P2 P3 |
| 21 July | 20:00 | Peru | 3–0 | Costa Rica | 25–10 | 25–14 | 25–9 | | | 75–33 | P2 P3 |

=== 5th–8th Semi-finals ===
| Date | Time | | Score | | Set 1 | Set 2 | Set 3 | Set 4 | Set 5 | Total | Report |
|---|---|---|---|---|---|---|---|---|---|---|---|
| 22 July | 14:00 | Honduras | 0–3 | Canada | 13–25 | 13–25 | 12–25 | | | 38–75 | P2 P3 |
| 22 July | 16:00 | Cuba | 3–0 | Costa Rica | 25–18 | 25–21 | 25–20 | | | 75–59 | P2 P3 |

=== Semi-finals ===
| Date | Time | | Score | | Set 1 | Set 2 | Set 3 | Set 4 | Set 5 | Total | Report |
|---|---|---|---|---|---|---|---|---|---|---|---|
| 22 July | 18:00 | Dominican Republic | 3–1 | Argentina | 20–25 | 25–18 | 25–13 | 25–19 | | 95–75 | P2 P3 |
| 22 July | 20:00 | Mexico | 3–0 | Peru | 25–21 | 25–17 | 25–21 | | | 75–59 | P2 P3 |

=== 7th place match ===
| Date | Time | | Score | | Set 1 | Set 2 | Set 3 | Set 4 | Set 5 | Total | Report |
|---|---|---|---|---|---|---|---|---|---|---|---|
| 23 July | 14:00 | Honduras | 3–2 | Costa Rica | 13–25 | 25–18 | 25–23 | 19–25 | 15–13 | 97–104 | P2 P3 |

=== 5th place match ===
| Date | Time | | Score | | Set 1 | Set 2 | Set 3 | Set 4 | Set 5 | Total | Report |
|---|---|---|---|---|---|---|---|---|---|---|---|
| 23 July | 16:00 | Canada | 3–0 | Cuba | 25–18 | 25–9 | 25–20 | | | 75–47 | P2 P3 |

=== 3rd place match ===
| Date | Time | | Score | | Set 1 | Set 2 | Set 3 | Set 4 | Set 5 | Total | Report |
|---|---|---|---|---|---|---|---|---|---|---|---|
| 23 July | 18:00 | Argentina | 3–1 | Peru | 24–26 | 25–19 | 25–21 | 25–21 | | 99–87 | P2 P3 |

=== Final ===
| Date | Time | | Score | | Set 1 | Set 2 | Set 3 | Set 4 | Set 5 | Total | Report |
|---|---|---|---|---|---|---|---|---|---|---|---|
| 23 July | 20:00 | Dominican Republic | 3–1 | Mexico | 25–18 | 23–25 | 25–12 | 26–24 | | 99–79 | P2 P3 |

== Final standing ==
| Rank | Team |
|---|---|
| 1st place, gold medalist(s) | Dominican Republic |
| 2nd place, silver medalist(s) | Mexico |
| 3rd place, bronze medalist(s) | Argentina |
| 4 | Peru |
| 5 | Canada |
| 6 | Cuba |
| 7 | Honduras |
| 8 | Costa Rica |

2023 Women's U23 Pan-American Cup champions

Dominican Republic
Fifth title

Team Roster:

Flormarie Heredia, Iliana Rodríguez (L), Edily Soler, Camila De La Rosa (c), Geraldine González, Madeline Guillén, Ariana Rodríguez, Alondra Tapia, Cindy Martínez, Elsa Cuevas, Vallery Martínez, Florangel Terrero

Head coach: (Brazil) Wagner Rocha

== Individual awards ==
- Most valuable player
  - Ariana Rodríguez (DOM)
- Best scorer
  - Sofía Maldonado (MEX)
- Best spiker
  - Sofía Maldonado (MEX)
  - Flormarie Heredia (DOM)
- Best Middle Blocker
  - Geraldine González (DOM)/
  - Florangel Terrero (DOM)
- Best setter
  - Ariana Rodríguez (DOM)
- Best Opposite
  - María Paula Rodríguez (PER)
- Best libero
  - Pamela Cuya (PER)
- Best digger
  - Pamela Cuya (PER)
- Best receiver
  - Victoria Caballero (ARG)
- Best server
  - Ximena Cruz (MEX)
