= Volleyball at the 2025 Junior Pan American Games =

Volleyball at the 2025 Junior American Games
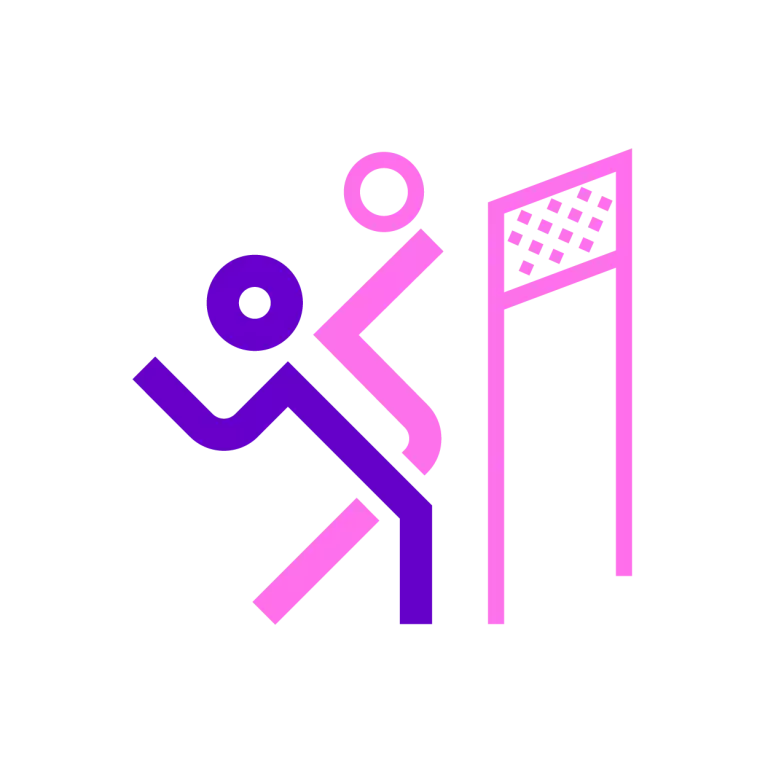
- Venue: COP Arena
- Start date: August 10, 2025
- End date: August 22, 2025
- No. of events: 2 (1 men, 1 women)
- Competitors: 192 from 10 nations

The volleyball events at the 2025 Junior Pan American Games were held at the COP Arena in Luque, in the Greater Asuncion area. The events were contested between August 10 and 22, 2025.

Two tournaments were contested, one for men and one for women. The winner of each event qualified for the 2027 Pan American Games in Lima, Peru.

== Qualification ==
A total of 16 teams qualified for the events, based on confederation rankings.

Qualification	Berths	Men's teams	Women's teams
Host country	1	Paraguay	Paraguay
NORCECA Ranking	4	Cuba; Dominican Republic; Guatemala; Mexico	Costa Rica; Cuba; Dominican Republic; Mexico
CSV Ranking	4	Argentina; Brazil; Colombia	Argentina; Brazil; Chile

== Medal summary ==
=== Medal table ===
Rank	Nation	Gold	Silver	Bronze	Total
1	Brazil	2	0	0	2
2	Argentina	0	1	0	1
2	Mexico	0	1	0	1
4	Cuba	0	0	1	1
4	Dominican Republic	0	0	1	1
Totals (5 entries)		2	2	2	6

=== Medalists ===
Event	Gold	Silver	Bronze
Men's tournament	Brazil; Lucas Oishi; Gustavo Cardoso; Gabriel Ostapechen; Guilherme Amorim; Samuel Neufeld; Marcos Junior Gonçalves; Witallo Oliveira; Thiery Nascimento; Pedro Henrique Souza; Maicon França; Matheus Bandini; Juan Pablo Gama	Argentina; Federico Trucco; Samuel Guidi; Ezequiel Vázquez; Nahuel Rojas; Giuliano Turcitu; Federico Debonis; Mauro Gay; Nahuel García; Iván Matías Pavón; Nehuén D'Aversa; Pablo Denis; Nicolás Oldani	Cuba; Jesús Pereira; Yonni Iglesias; Alejandro González; Andy Marrero; Thiago Suárez; Brayan Valle; Bryan Camino; Yusniel González; Jakdiel Contreras; Abel Domínguez; Alexis Wilson; Dayron Gallego
Women's tournament	Brazil; Heloise Soares; Adria Julia da Silva; Julliana Gandra; Stephany Morete; Jaqueline Schmitz; Lívia dos Santos; Camilly Salomé; Maria Clara Carvalhaes; Gabriela Carneiro; Maria Clara Andrade; Ana Luiza Rüdiger; Letícia Araújo	Mexico; Ashly Morales; Cassandra Soto; Alejandra Cordova; Jimena Salinas; Katherine Ramírez; Arleth Márquez; Ximena Solar; Marcela Herrera; Andrea Felix; Aime Topete; Michelle Lizarraga; Aitana Tanguma	Dominican Republic; Edily Soler; Ambar Hernández; Katielle Alonzo; Alondra Tapia; Kirssy Fernandez; Selanny Puente; Ailyn Liberato; Vallery Martínez; Crismeily Paniagua; Dilenny Maleno; Florangel Terrero

== Men's tournament ==
=== Preliminary round ===
==== Group A ====
Pos	Team	Pld	W	L	Pts	SPW	SPL	SPR	SW	SL	SR
1	Mexico	3	3	0	9	244	194	1.258	9	1	9.000
2	Colombia	3	2	1	4	311	311	1.000	7	7	1.000
3	Guatemala	3	1	2	4	252	266	0.947	5	7	0.714
4	Paraguay	3	0	3	1	253	289	0.875	3	9	0.333

Source: Asunción 2025

==== Group B ====
Pos	Team	Pld	W	L	Pts	SPW	SPL	SPR	SW	SL	SR
1	Brazil	3	3	0	13	258	218	1.183	9	2	4.500
2	Argentina	3	2	1	9	307	285	1.077	8	6	1.333
3	Cuba	3	1	2	7	241	250	0.964	5	6	0.833
4	Dominican Republic	3	0	3	0	192	245	0.784	1	9	0.111

Source: Asunción 2025

=== Championship bracket ===
Quarterfinals
Colombia	0
Cuba	3
Argentina	3
Guatemala	0

Semifinals
Brazil	3
Cuba	2
Mexico	0
Argentina	3

Final
Brazil	3
Argentina	2
Third place
Cuba	3
Mexico	1

=== Final standing ===
Rank	Team
1st place, gold medalist(s)	Brazil
2nd place, silver medalist(s)	Argentina
3rd place, bronze medalist(s)	Cuba
4	Mexico
5	Dominican Republic
6	Colombia
7	Guatemala
8	Paraguay

Team qualified to the 2027 Pan American Games

== Women's tournament ==
=== Preliminary round ===
==== Group A ====
Pos	Team	Pld	W	L	Pts	SPW	SPL	SPR	SW	SL	SR
1	Argentina	3	3	0	15	225	163	1.380	9	0	MAX
2	Cuba	3	2	1	10	212	157	1.350	6	3	2.000
3	Costa Rica	3	1	2	5	167	203	0.823	3	6	0.500
4	Paraguay	3	0	3	0	144	225	0.640	0	9	0.000

Source: Asunción 2025

10 August 2025; 11:00	Cuba	0–3	Argentina	COP Arena, Luque
10 August 2025; 11:00	(18–25, 21–25, 23–25); Report			COP Arena, Luque

10 August 2025; 20:30	Paraguay	0–3	Costa Rica	COP Arena, Luque
10 August 2025; 20:30	(21–25, 21–25, 11–25); Report			COP Arena, Luque

11 August 2025; 14:00	Cuba	3–0	Costa Rica	COP Arena, Luque
11 August 2025; 14:00	(25–11, 25–14, 25–15); Report			COP Arena, Luque

11 August 2025; 20:30	Paraguay	0–3	Argentina	COP Arena, Luque
11 August 2025; 20:30	(16–25, 12–25, 21–25); Report			COP Arena, Luque

12 August 2025; 14:00	Argentina	3–0	Costa Rica	COP Arena, Luque
12 August 2025; 14:00	(25–11, 25–19, 25–22); Report			COP Arena, Luque

12 August 2025; 20:30	Paraguay	0–3	Cuba	COP Arena, Luque
12 August 2025; 20:30	(16–25, 12–25, 14–25); Report			COP Arena, Luque

==== Group B ====
Pos	Team	Pld	W	L	Pts	SPW	SPL	SPR	SW	SL	SR
1	Brazil	3	3	0	13	268	197	1.360	9	2	4.500
2	Mexico	3	2	1	10	243	235	1.034	7	4	1.750
3	Dominican Republic	3	1	2	7	243	246	0.988	5	6	0.833
4	Chile	3	0	3	0	149	225	0.662	0	9	0.000

Source: Asunción 2025

10 August 2025; 14:00	Dominican Republic	3–0	Chile	COP Arena, Luque
10 August 2025; 14:00	(25–21, 25–15, 25–18); Report			COP Arena, Luque

10 August 2025; 17:30	Brazil	3–1	Mexico	COP Arena, Luque
10 August 2025; 17:30	(25–18, 21–25, 25–15, 25–15); Report			COP Arena, Luque

11 August 2025; 11:00	Dominican Republic	1–3	Mexico	COP Arena, Luque
11 August 2025; 11:00	(25–20, 20–25, 22–25, 16–25); Report			COP Arena, Luque

11 August 2025; 17:30	Brazil	3–0	Chile	COP Arena, Luque
11 August 2025; 17:30	(25–13, 25–14, 25–12); Report			COP Arena, Luque

12 August 2025; 11:00	Mexico	3–0	Chile	COP Arena, Luque
12 August 2025; 11:00	(25–23, 25–16, 25–17); Report			COP Arena, Luque

12 August 2025; 17:30	Dominican Republic	1–3	Brazil	COP Arena, Luque
12 August 2025; 17:30	(17–25, 23–25, 25–22, 20–25); Report			COP Arena, Luque

=== Championship bracket ===
Quarterfinals
Mexico	3
Costa Rica	0
Cuba	0
Dominican Republic	3

Semifinals
Brazil	3
Dominican Republic	0
Argentina	0
Mexico	3

Final
Brazil	3
Mexico	0
Third place
Dominican Republic	3
Argentina	1

=== Quarterfinals ===
13 August 2025; 16:00	Mexico	3–0	Costa Rica	COP Arena, Luque
13 August 2025; 16:00	(25–17, 25–18, 25–19); Report			COP Arena, Luque

13 August 2025; 19:00	Cuba	0–3	Dominican Republic	COP Arena, Luque
13 August 2025; 19:00	(20–25, 25–27, 18–25); Report			COP Arena, Luque

==== 5–8th place semifinals ====
14 August 2025; 11:00	Chile	1–3	Costa Rica	COP Arena, Luque
14 August 2025; 11:00	(23–25, 26–28, 25–21, 21–25); Report			COP Arena, Luque

14 August 2025; 14:00	Paraguay	0–3	Cuba	COP Arena, Luque
14 August 2025; 14:00	(18–25, 11–25, 19–25); Report			COP Arena, Luque

=== Semifinals ===
14 August 2025; 17:30	Brazil	3–0	Dominican Republic	COP Arena, Luque
14 August 2025; 17:30	(25–22, 25–19, 25–13); Report			COP Arena, Luque

14 August 2025; 20:30	Argentina	0–3	Mexico	COP Arena, Luque
14 August 2025; 20:30	(20–25, 12–25, 16–25); Report			COP Arena, Luque

=== Seventh place match ===
15 August 2025; 09:00	Chile	2–3	Paraguay	COP Arena, Luque
15 August 2025; 09:00	(25–20, 25–16, 16–25, 17–25, 12–15); Report			COP Arena, Luque

=== Fifth place match ===
15 August 2025; 11:00	Costa Rica	0–3	Cuba	COP Arena, Luque
15 August 2025; 11:00	(15–25, 13–25, 12–25); Report			COP Arena, Luque

=== Bronze medal match ===
15 August 2025; 13:00	Dominican Republic	3–1	Argentina	COP Arena, Luque
15 August 2025; 13:00	(25–17, 25–21, 21–25, 25–19); Report			COP Arena, Luque

=== Gold medal match ===
15 August 2025; 15:00	Brazil	3–0	Mexico	COP Arena, Luque
15 August 2025; 15:00	(25–23, 25–19, 25–14); Report			COP Arena, Luque

=== Final standing ===
Rank	Team
1st place, gold medalist(s)	Brazil
2nd place, silver medalist(s)	Mexico
3rd place, bronze medalist(s)	Dominican Republic
4	Argentina
5	Cuba
6	Costa Rica
7	Paraguay
8	Chile

Team qualified to the 2027 Pan American Games

== See also ==
- Beach volleyball at the 2025 Junior Pan American Games
