= 2026 Women's U23 NORCECA Pan American Cup =

Tournament details
- Host country: Nicaragua
- Dates: 1–6 September 2026
- Teams: 6
- Venue: 1 (in Managua host cities)

Final positions
- Champions: United States (2nd title)
- Runners-up: Dominican Republic
- Third place: Canada

Tournament awards
- MVP: Tessa Larkin (USA)

The 2026 Women's U23 NORCECA Pan American Cup was the ninth edition of the Women's U23 Pan-American Volleyball Cup. Six teams participated in this edition held at the Polideportivo Alexis Argüello in Managua, Nicaragua.

The United States won their second consecutive title, after defeated the Dominican Republic 3–1 in the final. Tessa Larkin of the United States won the Most Valuable Player award.

== Participation nations ==
- Canada
- Costa Rica
- Dominican Republic
- Mexico
- Nicaragua (host)
- United States

== Competition format ==
Six teams competed in a single pool during the preliminary round played in a round robin format. The first two ranked teams after group stage advanced to the final, the third and fourth rank teams advanced to the third place match, and the fifth and sixth rank teams advanced to the fifth place match.

== Competition venue ==
All matches
Managua, Nicaragua
Polideportivo Alexis Argüello
Capacity: 8,000
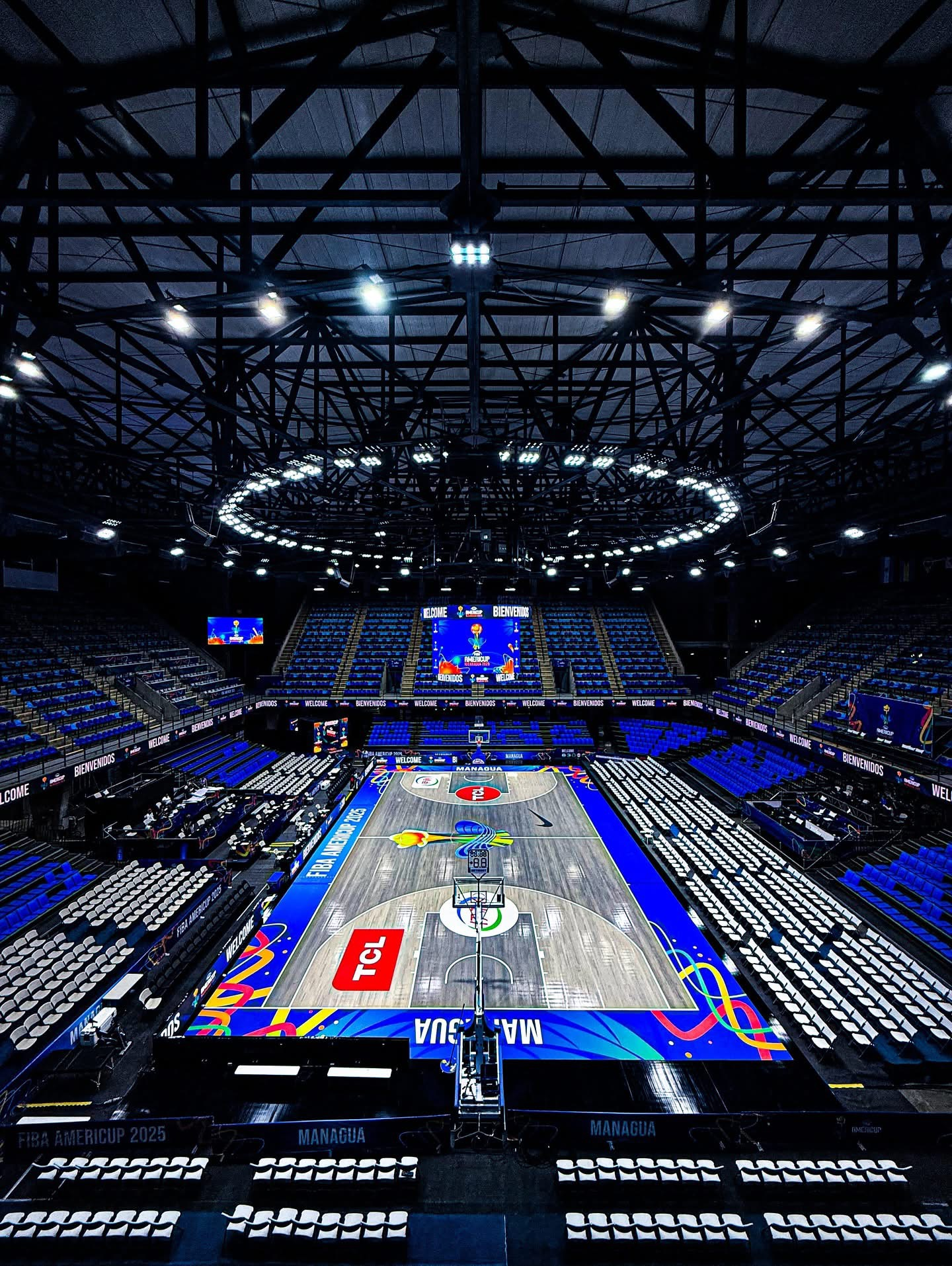

== Pool standing procedure ==
1. Number of matches won
2. Match points
3. Sets ratio
4. Points ratio
5. If the tie continues as per the point ratio between two teams, the priority will be given to the team which won the match between them. When the tie in points ratio is between three or more teams, a new classification of these teams in the terms of points 1, 2, 3 and 4 will be made taking into consideration only the matches in which they were opposed to each other.
- Match won 3–0 = 5 points
- Match won 3–1 = 4 points
- Match won 3–2 = 3 points
- Match lost 0–3 = 0 point
- Match lost 1–3 = 1 points
- Match lost 2–3 = 2 points
- Match forfeited = 0 points (0–25, 0–25, 0–25)

== Preliminary round ==
Pos	Team	Pld	W	L	Pts	SPW	SPL	SPR	SW	SL	SR	Qualification
1	United States	5	5	0	22	429	353	1.215	15	3	5.000	Final
2	Dominican Republic	5	3	2	18	418	352	1.188	12	6	2.000	Final
3	Mexico	5	3	2	16	415	348	1.193	11	7	1.571	Third place match
4	Canada	5	3	2	14	396	342	1.158	10	8	1.250	Third place match
5	Costa Rica	5	1	4	3	297	409	0.726	3	14	0.214	
6	Nicaragua	5	0	5	2	263	414	0.635	2	15	0.133	

Source: NORCECA

Date	Time		Score		Set 1	Set 2	Set 3	Set 4	Set 5	Total	Report
1 Sep	15:00	Dominican Republic	3–0	Costa Rica	25–16	25–17	25–18			75–51	P2 P3
1 Sep	17:00	United States	3–0	Canada	25–21	25–23	25–17			75–61	P2 P3
1 Sep	19:00	Nicaragua	0–3	Mexico	15–25	8–25	21–25			44–75	P2 P3
2 Sep	15:00	United States	3–0	Costa Rica	25–17	25–13	25–19			75–49	P2 P3
2 Sep	17:00	Dominican Republic	3–0	Mexico	25–17	25–21	29–27			79–65	P2 P3
2 Sep	19:00	Nicaragua	0–3	Canada	8–25	15–25	12–25			35–75	P2 P3
3 Sep	15:00	Dominican Republic	1–3	United States	25–21	23–25	22–25	23–25		93–96	P2 P3
3 Sep	17:00	Canada	1–3	Mexico	23–25	14–25	25–14	19–25		81–89	P2 P3
3 Sep	19:00	Nicaragua	2–3	Costa Rica	24–26	22–25	25–23	27–25	11–15	109–114	P2 P3
4 Sep	15:00	Dominican Republic	2–3	Canada	25–23	25–16	15–25	19–25	12–15	96–104	P2 P3
4 Sep	17:00	Mexico	3–0	Costa Rica	25–6	25–15	25–15			75–36	P2 P3
4 Sep	19:00	Nicaragua	0–3	United States	10–25	14–25	15–25			39–75	P2 P3
5 Sep	15:00	Canada	3–0	Costa Rica	25–18	25–19	25–10			75–47	P2 P3
5 Sep	17:00	United States	3–2	Mexico	27–25	18–25	25–23	23–25	15–13	108–111	P2 P3
5 Sep	19:00	Dominican Republic	3–0	Nicaragua	25–15	25–11	25–10			75–36	P2 P3

== Final round ==
=== Championship bracket ===
Final
United States	3
Dominican Republic	1
Third place
Mexico	2
Canada	3

=== Fifth place match ===
Date	Time		Score		Set 1	Set 2	Set 3	Set 4	Set 5	Total	Report
6 Sep	13:00	Costa Rica	3–0	Nicaragua	25–15	26–24	25–12			76–51	P2 P3

=== Third place match ===
Date	Time		Score		Set 1	Set 2	Set 3	Set 4	Set 5	Total	Report
6 Sep	15:00	Mexico	2–3	Canada	26–24	21–25	23–25	27–25	11–15	108–114	P2 P3

=== Final ===
Date	Time		Score		Set 1	Set 2	Set 3	Set 4	Set 5	Total	Report
6 Sep	17:00	United States	3–1	Dominican Republic	25–15	25–10	23–25	25–18		98–68	P2 P3

== Final standing ==
Rank	Team
1st place, gold medalist(s)	United States
2nd place, silver medalist(s)	Dominican Republic
3rd place, bronze medalist(s)	Canada
4	Mexico
5	Costa Rica
6	Nicaragua

== Individual awards ==
- Most valuable player
  - Tessa Larkin (USA)
- Best scorer
  - Aime Topete (MEX)
- Best setter
  - Ashly Morales (MEX)
- Best opposite
  - Alondra Tapia (DOM)
- Best spikers
  - Aime Topete (MEX)
  - Michelle Lizárraga (MEX)
- Best middle blockers
  - Veronica Dickson (CAN)
  - Megan Hodges (USA)
- Best libero
  - Rashell Easy Valverde (CRC)
- Best server
  - Arleth Márquez (MEX)
- Best receiver
  - Tessa Larkin (USA)
- Best digger
  - Kirssy Fernández (DOM)
