= United States women's national under-23 volleyball team =

United States U23
- Association: USA Volleyball
- Confederation: NORCECA

Uniforms
Home	Away

FIVB U23 World Championship
- Appearances: 1 (First in 2013)
- Best result: Fourth place: (2013)

Women's U23 NORCECA Pan American Cup
- Appearances: 2 (First in 2025)
- Best result: Gold : (2025, 2026)
- www.usavolleyball.org
Honours
Women's U23 NORCECA Pan American Cup
Gold medal – first place	2025 Mexico	Team
Gold medal – first place	2026 Nicaragua	Team

The United States women's national under-23 volleyball team represents the United States in international women's volleyball competitions and friendly matches under the age 23 and it is ruled by the American Volleyball Federation USAV body That is an affiliate of the International Volleyball Federation FIVB and also a part of the North, Central America and Caribbean Volleyball Confederation NORCECA.

== Results ==
=== FIVB Women's U23 World Championship ===
Champions Runners up Third place Fourth place

FIVB Women's U23 World Championship
Year	Round	Position	Pld	W	L	SW	SL	Squad
(Mexico) 2013	Semifinals	Fourth place	7	4	3	15	13	Squad
(Turkey) 2015	Didn't Qualify							
(Slovenia) 2017	Didn't Qualify							
Total	0 Title	1/3	7	4	3	15	13	—N/a

=== Women's U23 NORCECA Pan American Cup ===
Champions Runners up Third place Fourth place

Women's U23 NORCECA Pan American Cup
Year	Round	Position	Pld	W	L	SW	SL	Squad
(Peru) 2012	Didn't participate							
(Peru) 2014	Didn't participate							
(Peru) 2016	Didn't participate							
(Peru) 2018	Didn't participate							
(Mexico) 2021	Didn't participate							
(Mexico) 2023	Didn't participate							
(Mexico) 2024	Didn't participate							
(Mexico) 2025	Final	Champions	5	5	0	15	2	Squad
(Nicaragua) 2026	Final	Champions	6	6	0	18	4	Squad
Total	2 Titles	2/9	11	11	0	33	6	—N/a

== Team ==
=== Current Squad ===
The following is the American roster in the 2026 Women's U23 NORCECA Pan American Cup.

Head Coach: Alex Dunphy

No.	Name	Date of birth	Height	Weight	Spike	Block	School / club
1	Taimane Ainu’u		1.84 m (6 ft 0 in)				(United States) Iolani HS
3	Cala Haffner		1.72 m (5 ft 8 in)				(United States) Carroll HS
6	Megan Hodges		1.96 m (6 ft 5 in)				(United States) San Juan Hills HS
13	Shayla Rautenberg		1.94 m (6 ft 4 in)				(United States) Milford HS
14	Ireland Real		1.94 m (6 ft 4 in)				(United States) Santa Margarita Catholic HS
19	Ava Burgess		1.88 m (6 ft 2 in)				(United States) Lone Peak HS
20	Willtrace Ngoh		1.86 m (6 ft 1 in)				(United States) Katy Seven Lakes HS
21	Sophee Peterson		1.80 m (5 ft 11 in)				(United States) Byron Nelson HS
22	Isabel Incinelli		1.96 m (6 ft 5 in)				(United States) Winter Park HS
23	Nyla Livings		1.88 m (6 ft 2 in)				(United States) Prestonwood Christian Academy
24	Kendall Omoruyi		1.94 m (6 ft 4 in)				(United States) Sierra Canyon HS
25	Peyton Kubik		1.88 m (6 ft 2 in)				(United States) Blue Valley West HS
26	Tessa Larkin		1.86 m (6 ft 1 in)				(United States) Xavier College Preparatory
27	Mallory Johnson		1.76 m (5 ft 9 in)				(United States) Bryon Center HS
