= 2025 Women's U23 NORCECA Pan American Cup =

Tournament details
- Host country: Mexico
- Dates: 25 July – 2 August 2025
- Teams: 8
- Venue: (in León, Guanajuato host cities)

Final positions
- Champions: United States (1st title)
- Runners-up: Canada
- Third place: Mexico

Tournament awards
- MVP: Ifennamaka Cos-Okpalla (USA)

The 2025 Women's U23 NORCECA Pan American Cup was the eighth edition of the bi-annual women's volleyball tournament. Eight teams participated in this edition held in León, Guanajuato.

The United States won their first title, after defeated Canada 3–0 in the final. Ifennamaka Cos-Okpalla of the United States won the Most Valuable Player award.

== Preliminary round ==
=== Group A ===
Pos	Team	Pld	W	L	Pts	SPW	SPL	SPR	SW	SL	SR	Qualification
1	United States	3	3	0	15	227	133	1.707	9	0	MAX	Semifinals
2	Dominican Republic	3	2	1	10	215	131	1.641	6	3	2.000	Quarterfinals
3	Costa Rica	3	1	2	5	145	206	0.704	3	6	0.500	Quarterfinals
4	Suriname	3	0	3	0	108	225	0.480	0	9	0.000	

Date	Time		Score		Set 1	Set 2	Set 3	Set 4	Set 5	Total	Report
27 July	14:00	Dominican Republic	0–3	United States	25–27	19–25	21–25			65–77	P2 P3
27 July	16:00	Suriname	0–3	Costa Rica	23–25	15–25	18–25			56–75	P2 P3
28 July	14:00	Suriname	0–3	United States	10–25	13–25	7–25			30–75	P2 P3
28 July	16:00	Dominican Republic	3–0	Costa Rica	25–9	25–9	25–14			75–32	P2 P3
29 July	14:00	Dominican Republic	3–0	Suriname	25–4	25–11	25–7			75–22	P2 P3
29 July	16:00	Costa Rica	0–3	United States	18–25	10–25	10–25			38–75	P2 P3

=== Group B ===
Pos	Team	Pld	W	L	Pts	SPW	SPL	SPR	SW	SL	SR	Qualification
1	Cuba	3	3	0	12	288	259	1.112	9	3	3.000	Semifinals
2	Mexico	3	2	1	11	249	193	1.290	7	3	2.333	Quarterfinals
3	Canada	3	1	2	7	235	223	1.054	5	6	0.833	Quarterfinals
4	Nicaragua	3	0	3	0	128	225	0.569	0	9	0.000	

Date	Time		Score		Set 1	Set 2	Set 3	Set 4	Set 5	Total	Report
27 July	18:00	Cuba	3–2	Canada	18–25	23–25	26–24	25–18	17–15	109–107	P2 P3
27 July	20:00	Mexico	3–0	Nicaragua	25–14	25–14	25–8			75–36	P2 P3
28 July	18:00	Cuba	3–0	Nicaragua	25–18	25–19	25–16			75–53	P2 P3
28 July	20:00	Mexico	3–0	Canada	25–17	25–20	25–16			75–53	P2 P3
29 July	18:00	Nicaragua	0–3	Canada	12–25	14–25	13–25			39–75	P2 P3
29 July	20:00	Cuba	3–1	Mexico	31–29	21–25	25–20	27–25		104–99	P2 P3

== Final round ==
=== Bracket ===
Quarterfinals
A2	Dominican Republic	2
B3	Canada	3
B2	Mexico	3
A3	Costa Rica	0

Semifinals
B1	Cuba	2
B3	Canada	3
B2	Mexico	2
A1	United States	3

Final
B3	Canada	0
A1	United States	3
Third place
B1	Cuba	2
B2	Mexico	3

=== Quarterfinals ===
Date	Time		Score		Set 1	Set 2	Set 3	Set 4	Set 5	Total	Report
30 July	17:00	Dominican Republic	2–3	Canada	20–25	25–19	25–12	21–25	9–15	100–96	P2 P3
30 July	19:00	Mexico	3–0	Costa Rica	25–11	25–9	25–13			75–33	P2 P3

=== Classification 5th–8th ===
Date	Time		Score		Set 1	Set 2	Set 3	Set 4	Set 5	Total	Report
31 July	14:00	Suriname	0–3	Dominican Republic	13–25	5–25	11–25			29–75	P2 P3
31 July	16:00	Nicaragua	3–2	Costa Rica	25–22	25–21	23–25	19–25	15–13	107–106	P2 P3

=== Semifinals ===
Date	Time		Score		Set 1	Set 2	Set 3	Set 4	Set 5	Total	Report
31 July	20:00	United States	3–2	Mexico	20–25	27–25	25–20	21–25	15–10	108–105	P2 P3
31 July	18:00	Cuba	2–3	Canada	25–21	25–22	19–25	22–25	9–15	100–108	P2 P3

=== 7th place match ===
Date	Time		Score		Set 1	Set 2	Set 3	Set 4	Set 5	Total	Report
1 August	10:00	Suriname	0–3	Costa Rica	11–25	11–25	15–25			37–75	P2 P3

=== 5th place match ===
Date	Time		Score		Set 1	Set 2	Set 3	Set 4	Set 5	Total	Report
1 August	12:00	Dominican Republic	3–0	Nicaragua	25–16	25–7	25–15			75–38	P2 P3

=== Third place match ===
Date	Time		Score		Set 1	Set 2	Set 3	Set 4	Set 5	Total	Report
1 August	14:00	Cuba	2–3	Mexico	21–25	25–22	25–19	15–25	11–15	97–106	P2 P3

=== Final ===
Date	Time		Score		Set 1	Set 2	Set 3	Set 4	Set 5	Total	Report
1 August	16:00	Canada	0–3	United States	16–25	15–25	19–25			50–75	P2 P3

== Final standing ==
Rank	Team
1st place, gold medalist(s)	United States
2nd place, silver medalist(s)	Canada
3rd place, bronze medalist(s)	Mexico
4	Cuba
5	Dominican Republic
6	Nicaragua
7	Costa Rica
8	Suriname

== Individual awards ==
- Most valuable player
  - Ifennamaka Cos-Okpalla (USA)
- Best scorer
  - Aime Topete (MEX)
- Best setter
  - sabella Noblle (CAN)
- Best Opposite
  - Ivanny Blackwood (CRC)
- Best spikers
  - Aime Topete (MEX)
  - Raya Surinx (CAN)
- Best middle blockers
  - Cos-Okpalla Ifennamaka (USA)
  - Lianet Garcia (CUB)
- Best libero
  - Emily Klika (USA)
- Best server
  - Aitana Rettke (MEX)
- Best receiver
  - Emily Klika (USA)
- Best digger
  - Emily Klika (USA)
