= Dalila Palma =

Cuban volleyball player (born 1999)

Personal information
- Full name: Dalila Palma Rodriguez
- Nationality: Cuba
- Born: 18 November 1999 (age 26); Cienfuegos, Cuba
- Height: 1.94 m (6 ft 4 1/2 in)
- Weight: 62 kg (137 lb)
- Spike: 3.15 m (124 in) (10.3 ft)
- Block: 3.00 m (118 in) (9.84 ft)

Volleyball information
- Position: Wing Spiker
- Current club: İlBank
- Number: 16

Career
Years
- 2015–2019
- 2019–2020
- 2020–2021
- 2021–2023
- 2023–2024
- 2024–
Teams
- (Cuba) Cienfuegos
- (France) Volero Le Cannet
- (France) Municipal Olympique Mougin
- (Switzerland) Volero Zürich
- (Turkey) İstanbul Büyükşehir Belediyespor
- (Turkey) İlBank

National team
- 2015
- 2014–2016
- 2016–2017
- 2015–2016
- Cuba U19
- Cuba U21
- Cuba U23
- Cuba
Honours
Women's volleyball
Representing Cuba
Women's U23 Pan-American Cup
Bronze medal – third place	2016 San Vicente de Cañete	U23 team
Women's Junior NORCECA Championship
Bronze medal – third place	2016 Fort Lauderdale	U21 team
Silver medal – second place	2014 Guatemala	U21 team
Girls' Youth Pan-American Cup
Bronze medal – third place	2015 Havana	U19 team

Dalila Palma Rodriguez (born 18 November 1999) is a Cuban volleyball player, who plays for İlBank in the Turkish Women's League.

== Personal life ==
Palma was born in Cienfuegos, Cuba on 18 November 1999.

== Club career ==
Palma played in her country for her hometown club Cienfuegos. She then moved to France, and was with Volero Le Cannet and Municipal Olympique Mougin. Later, she joined Volero Zürich in Switzerland. In 2023, she went to Turkey, and signed with İstanbul Büyükşehir Belediyespor. In 2024, she transferred to the Ankara-based club İlBank.

== International career ==
At a very young age, Palma was a member of the national volleyball team, participating in NORCECA and the Grand Prix with good performance.

=== Cuba U19 ===
Palma was part of the Cuba U19 team at the 2015 Girls' Youth Pan-American Cup in Havana, Cuba, and 2015 FIVB Girls' U18 World Championship in Lima, Peru.

=== Cuba U21 ===
She was a member of the Cuba U21 team at the 2014 Women's Junior NORCECA Championship in Guatemala, 2015 FIVB Women's U20 World Championship in Puerto Rico, and 2016 Women's Junior NORCECA Championship in Fort Lauderdale, Florida, USA.

=== Cuba U23 ===
With the Cuba U23 team, she took part at the 2016 Women's U23 Pan-American Cup in San Vicente de Cañete, Peru, and 2017 FIVB Women's U23 World Championship in Ljubljana, Slovenia.

=== Cuba ===
She was admitted to the Cuba team to play at the 2015 FIVB World Grand Prix in Omaha, USA, 2015 FIVB Women's World Cup in Japan and 2016 FIVB World Grand Prix in Bangkok, Thailand.

== Honours ==
Cuba U23

- (bronze) 2016 Women's U23 Pan-American Cup

Cuba U21

- (silver) 2014 Women's Junior NORCECA Championship
- (bronze) 2016 Women's Junior NORCECA Championship

Cuba U19

- (bronze) 2015 Girls' Youth Pan-American Cup
