= 2018 Women's U23 Pan-American Volleyball Cup =

Tournament details
- Host country: Peru
- Dates: 14–19 August
- Teams: 8
- Venue: 1 (in 1 host city)

Final positions
- Champions: Dominican Republic (4th title)

Tournament awards
- MVP: Gaila González (DOM)

The 2018 Women's U23 Pan-American Volleyball Cup was the fourth edition of the bi-annual women's volleyball tournament. It was held in Lima, Peru from 14 to 19 August among eight national U23 teams.

== Pools composition ==
Pool A	Pool B
Chile	Colombia
Cuba	Costa Rica
Guatemala	Dominican Republic
Peru	Mexico

== Pool standing procedure ==
1. Number of matches won
2. Match points
3. Points ratio
4. Sets ratio
5. Result of the last match between the tied teams

Match won 3–0: 5 match points for the winner, 0 match points for the loser
Match won 3–1: 4 match points for the winner, 1 match point for the loser
Match won 3–2: 3 match points for the winner, 2 match points for the loser

== Preliminary round ==
- All times are in Peru Time (UTC−05:00)

=== Group A ===
Pos	Team	Pld	W	L	Pts	SPW	SPL	SPR	SW	SL	SR	Qualification
1	Peru	3	3	0	14	248	197	1.259	9	1	9.000	Semifinals
2	Cuba	3	2	1	11	242	185	1.308	7	3	2.333	Quarterfinals
3	Chile	3	1	2	5	183	191	0.958	3	6	0.500	Quarterfinals
4	Guatemala	3	0	3	0	125	225	0.556	0	9	0.000	5th–8th classification

Date	Time		Score		Set 1	Set 2	Set 3	Set 4	Set 5	Total	Report
14 Aug	15:00	Cuba	3–0	Guatemala	25–19	25–9	25–15			75–43	P2 P3
14 Aug	19:00	Peru	3–0	Chile	25–23	25–21	25–20			75–64	P2 P3
15 Aug	15:00	Chile	0–3	Cuba	20–25	12–25	12–25			44–75	P2 P3
15 Aug	19:00	Peru	3–0	Guatemala	25–17	25–11	25–13			75–41	P2 P3
16 Aug	13:00	Chile	3–0	Guatemala	25–14	25–8	25–19			75–41	P2 P3
16 Aug	19:00	Peru	3–1	Cuba	25–22	21–25	25–20	27–25		98–92	P2 P3

=== Group B ===
Pos	Team	Pld	W	L	Pts	SPW	SPL	SPR	SW	SL	SR	Qualification
1	Dominican Republic	3	3	0	15	225	144	1.563	9	0	MAX	Semifinals
2	Mexico	3	2	1	8	240	209	1.148	6	5	1.200	Quarterfinals
3	Colombia	3	1	2	7	209	238	0.878	5	6	0.833	Quarterfinals
4	Costa Rica	3	0	3	0	144	227	0.634	0	9	0.000	5th–8th classification

Date	Time		Score		Set 1	Set 2	Set 3	Set 4	Set 5	Total	Report
14 Aug	13:00	Dominican Republic	3–0	Costa Rica	25–16	25–15	25–11			75–42	P2 P3
14 Aug	17:00	Mexico	3–2	Colombia	23–25	25–14	16–25	25–18	15–9	104–91	P2 P3
15 Aug	13:00	Colombia	3–0	Costa Rica	25–17	27–25	25–17			77–59	P2 P3
15 Aug	17:00	Dominican Republic	3–0	Mexico	25–22	25–18	25–21			75–61	P2 P3
16 Aug	15:00	Costa Rica	0–3	Mexico	17–25	13–25	13–25			43–75	P2 P3
16 Aug	17:00	Colombia	0–3	Dominican Republic	13–25	13–25	15–25			41–75	P2 P3

== Final round ==
=== Championship bracket ===
Quarterfinals
A2	Cuba	3
B3	Colombia	0
B2	Mexico	3
A3	Chile	2

Semifinals
B1	Dominican Republic	3
A2	Cuba	1
A1	Peru	3
B2	Mexico	0

Final
B1	Dominican Republic	3
A1	Peru	0
3rd place
A2	Cuba	3
B2	Mexico	1

=== 5th–8th places bracket ===
Classification 5–8
B4	Costa Rica	0
A3	Chile	3
A4	Guatemala	0
B3	Colombia	3

5th place
A3	Chile	0
B3	Colombia	3
7th place
B4	Costa Rica	2
A4	Guatemala	3

==== Quarterfinals ====
Date	Time		Score		Set 1	Set 2	Set 3	Set 4	Set 5	Total	Report
17 Aug	17:00	Mexico	3–2	Chile	22–25	25–16	25–23	23–25	15–9	110–98	P2 P3
17 Aug	19:00	Cuba	3–0	Colombia	25–13	25–18	25–15			75–46	P2 P3

==== Classification 5th–8th ====
Date	Time		Score		Set 1	Set 2	Set 3	Set 4	Set 5	Total	Report
18 Aug	12:00	Costa Rica	0–3	Chile	12–25	22–25	14–25			48–75	P2 P3
18 Aug	14:00	Guatemala	0–3	Colombia	14–25	13–25	13–25			40–75	P2 P3

==== Semifinals ====
Date	Time		Score		Set 1	Set 2	Set 3	Set 4	Set 5	Total	Report
18 Aug	16:00	Dominican Republic	3–1	Cuba	22–25	25–16	25–13	25–21		97–75	P2 P3
18 Aug	18:00	Peru	3–0	Mexico	25–18	25–17	25–15			75–50	P2 P3

==== 7th place match ====
Date	Time		Score		Set 1	Set 2	Set 3	Set 4	Set 5	Total	Report
19 Aug	12:00	Costa Rica	2–3	Guatemala	25–20	25–20	27–29	17–25	9–15	103–109	P2 P3

==== 5th place match ====
Date	Time		Score		Set 1	Set 2	Set 3	Set 4	Set 5	Total	Report
19 Aug	14:00	Chile	0–3	Colombia	17–25	21–25	13–25			51–75	P2 P3

==== 3rd place match ====
Date	Time		Score		Set 1	Set 2	Set 3	Set 4	Set 5	Total	Report
19 Aug	16:00	Cuba	3–1	Mexico	25–15	25–23	22–25	28–26		100–89	P2 P3

==== Final ====
Date	Time		Score		Set 1	Set 2	Set 3	Set 4	Set 5	Total	Report
19 Aug	18:00	Dominican Republic	3–0	Peru	25–10	25–17	25–18			75–45	P2 P3

== Final standing ==
Rank	Team
1st place, gold medalist(s)	Dominican Republic
2nd place, silver medalist(s)	Peru
3rd place, bronze medalist(s)	Cuba
4	Mexico
5	Colombia
6	Chile
7	Guatemala
8	Costa Rica

2018 Women's U23 Pan-American Cup champions

Dominican Republic
4th title

Team Roster:

Gaila González, Vielka Peralta, Camila de la Rosa, Natalia Martínez, Angelica Hinojosa, Geraldine González, Yokaty Pérez, Yanlis Feliz, Larysmer Martínez, Brayelin Martínez, Jineiry Martínez,

Yaneirys Rodríguez
Head coach: (Brazil) Wagner Pacheco

== Individual awards ==
- Most valuable player
  - Gaila González (DOM)
- Best scorer
  - Uxue Guereca (MEX)
- Best spiker
  - Vielka Peralta (DOM)
  - Brenda Lobatón (PER)
- Best Middle Blocker
  - Jineiry Martínez (DOM)
  - Valerin Carabalí (COL)
- Best setter
  - Shiamara Almeida (PER)
- Best Opposite
  - Gaila González (DOM)
- Best libero
  - Esmeralda Sánchez (PER)
- Best digger
  - Esmeralda Sánchez (PER)
- Best receiver
  - Brenda Lobatón (PER)
- Best server
  - Ailama Cese (CUB)
