= Chile women's national under-23 volleyball team =

Youth volleyball team representing Chile

Chile
- Association: Chilean Volleyball Federation
- Confederation: CSV

Uniforms
| Home | Away |

FIVB U23 World Championship
- Appearances: No appearances

South America U22 Championship
- Appearances: 2 (First in 2014)
- Best result: 5th Place : (2014, 2016).

The Chile women's national under-23 volleyball team represents Chile in women's under-23 volleyball Events, it is controlled and managed by the Chilean Volleyball Federation that is a member of South American volleyball body Confederación Sudamericana de Voleibol (CSV) and the international volleyball body government the Fédération Internationale de Volleyball (FIVB).

== Results ==
=== FIVB U23 World Championship ===
Champions Runners up Third place Fourth place

FIVB U23 World Championship
| Year | Round | Position | Pld | W | L | SW | SL | Squad |
|---|---|---|---|---|---|---|---|---|
| (Mexico) 2013 | Didn't Qualify | | | | | | | |
| (Turkey) 2015 | Didn't Qualify | | | | | | | |
| (Slovenia) 2017 | Didn't Qualify | | | | | | | |
| Total | 0 Titles | 0/3 | | | | | | |

=== U23 Pan American Cup ===
Champions Runners up Third place Fourth place

U23 Pan American Cup
| Year | Round | Position | Pld | W | L | SW | SL | Squad |
|---|---|---|---|---|---|---|---|---|
| (Peru) 2012 | Didn't Compete | | | | | | | |
| (Peru) 2014 | Didn't Compete | | | | | | | |
| (Peru) 2016 | Didn't Compete | | | | | | | |
| (Peru) 2018 | | Qualified | | | | | | squad |
| Total | 0 Titles | 1/4 | | | | | | |

=== South America U22 Championship ===
Champions Runners up Third place Fourth place

South America U22 Championship
| Year | Round | Position | GP | MW | ML | SW | SL | Squad |
|---|---|---|---|---|---|---|---|---|
| (Colombia) 2014 | | 5th place | | | | | | Squad |
| (Peru) 2016 | | 5th place | | | | | | Squad |
| Total | 0 Titles | 2/2 | | | | | | |

== Team ==
=== Current squad ===
The following list of players represent Chile in the 2018 Women's U23 Pan-American Volleyball Cup

Head coach : Eduardo Guillaume

| No. | Name | Date of birth | Height | Weight | Spike | Block | 2018 club |
|---|---|---|---|---|---|---|---|
| 1 | Flores | 29 May 1999 | 1.75 m (5 ft 9 in) | 70 kg (150 lb) | 000 cm (0 in) | 000 cm (0 in) | |
| 2 | Reyes | 14 March 1998 | 1.76 m (5 ft 9 in) | 74 kg (163 lb) | 000 cm (0 in) | 000 cm (0 in) | |
| 3 | Carvajal (Captain) | 25 January 1998 | 1.79 m (5 ft 10 in) | 72 kg (159 lb) | 000 cm (0 in) | 000 cm (0 in) | |
| 4 | Novoa | 5 February 2001 | 1.75 m (5 ft 9 in) | 63 kg (139 lb) | 000 cm (0 in) | 000 cm (0 in) | |
| 5 | Salinas | 30 October 2000 | 1.67 m (5 ft 6 in) | 60 kg (130 lb) | 000 cm (0 in) | 000 cm (0 in) | |
| 8 | Bertens | 24 October 2001 | 1.81 m (5 ft 11 in) | 91 kg (201 lb) | 000 cm (0 in) | 000 cm (0 in) | |
| 9 | Gallardo | 12 April 1998 | 1.66 m (5 ft 5 in) | 68 kg (150 lb) | 000 cm (0 in) | 000 cm (0 in) | |
| 10 | Mendoza | 15 June 1998 | 1.83 m (6 ft 0 in) | 63 kg (139 lb) | 000 cm (0 in) | 000 cm (0 in) | |
| 11 | Carrasco | 19 October 2001 | 1.75 m (5 ft 9 in) | 68 kg (150 lb) | 000 cm (0 in) | 000 cm (0 in) | |
| 12 | Badilla | 3 February 2003 | 1.71 m (5 ft 7 in) | 62 kg (137 lb) | 000 cm (0 in) | 000 cm (0 in) | |
| 17 | Castro | 3 April 2001 | 1.79 m (5 ft 10 in) | 68 kg (150 lb) | 000 cm (0 in) | 000 cm (0 in) | |
| 18 | Munoz | 29 January 2002 | 1.72 m (5 ft 8 in) | 73 kg (161 lb) | 000 cm (0 in) | 000 cm (0 in) | |
