= Melissa Vargas =

Professional volleyball player (born 1999)

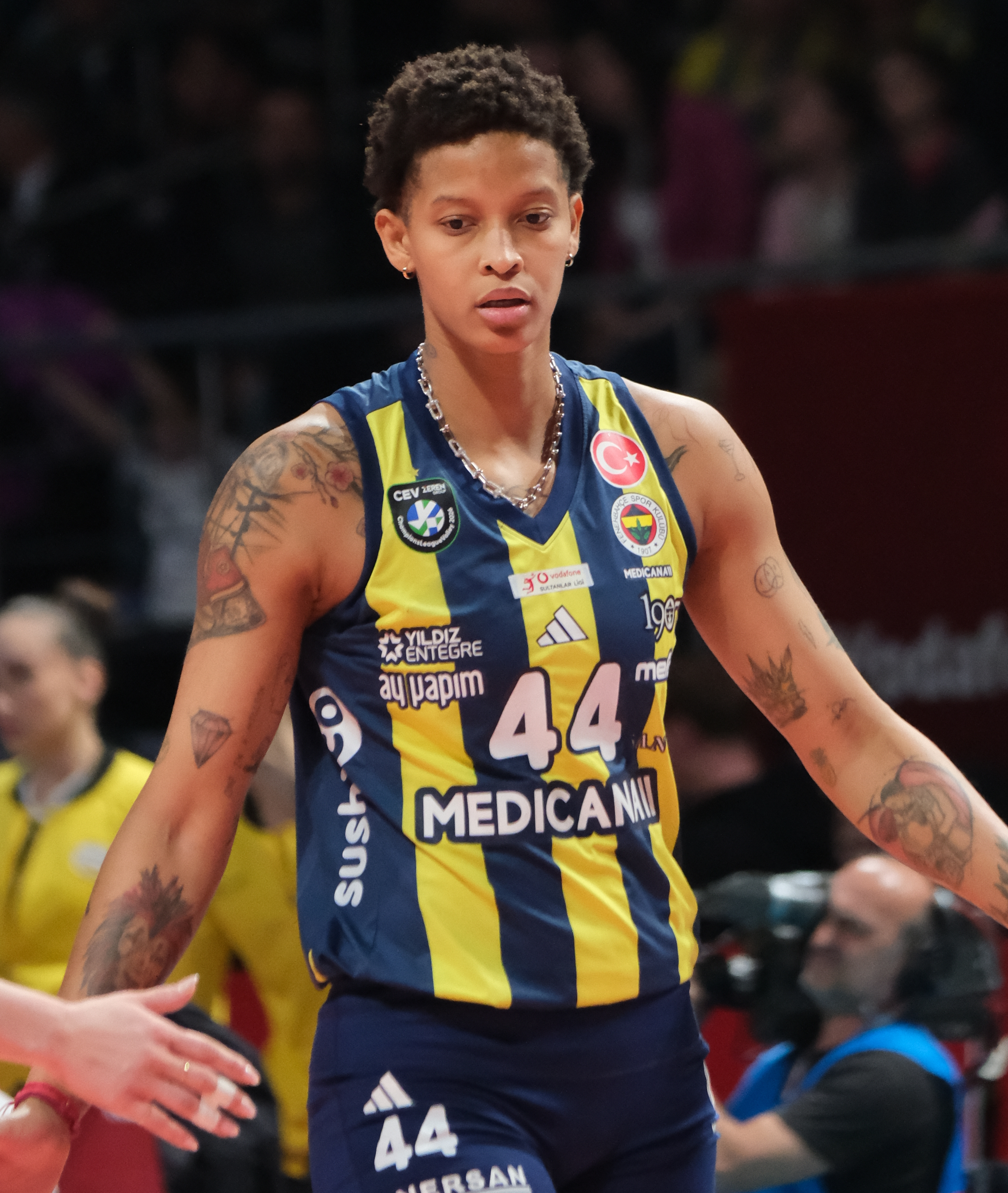

Personal information
- Full name: Melissa Teresa Vargas Abreu
- Nickname: Vargas Airlines
- Nationality: Cuban; Turkish (from 2021)
- Born: 16 October 1999 (age 27) Cienfuegos, Cuba
- Education: University of Cienfuegos
- Height: 1.95 m (6 ft 5 in)
- Weight: 76 kg (168 lb)
- Spike: 3.26 m (128 in)
- Block: 3.15 m (124 in)

Volleyball information
- Position: Wing Spiker / Opposite Spiker
- Current club: Fenerbahçe
- Number: 4 (national team), 44 (club)

Career
- Years: Team
- 2011–2015; 2015–2016; 2017–2018; 2018–; 2021; 2022; 2023: (Cuba) Cienfuegos; (Czech Republic) Agel Prostějov; (Switzerland) Volero Zürich; (Turkey) Fenerbahçe; → (China) Tianjin Bohai Bank; → (China) Tianjin Bohai Bank; → (China) Tianjin Bohai Bank

National team
- Years: Team
- 2012–2017; 2023–: Cuba; Turkey
Honours
Women's volleyball
Representing Turkey
World Championship
Silver medal – second place	2025 Thailand	Team
FIVB Nations League
Gold medal – first place	2023 Arlington	Team
Gold medal – first place	2026 Macau	Team
European Championship
Gold medal – first place	2023 Belgium/Italy/Estonia/Germany	Team
Gold medal – first place	2026 Azerbaijan/Czech Republic/Sweden/Turkey	Team
Representing Cuba
U23 Pan-American Cup
Bronze medal – third place	2014 Ica	Team

Melissa Teresa Vargas Abreu (born 16 October 1999) is a Cuban professional volleyball player who plays as an outside or opposite spiker for Sultans League club Fenerbahçe. Born in Cuba, she plays for the Turkey national team.

She was a member of the Cuba women's national volleyball team and was part of the national team at the 2014 FIVB Volleyball Women's World Championship in Italy. Since 2023, she has been playing in the Turkey women's national volleyball team.

== Personal life ==
Vargas was born in Cienfuegos, Cuba. Her father was a handball player, she began playing volleyball on the street at age six and joined her school's team at age eight. In 2021, she acquired Turkish citizenship.

== Career ==
She started training for the Cienfuegos team at the age of 12, also played in the Cuban national youth volleyball teams.

She played for Agel Prostějov in the Czech Republic for one season in 2016. She suffered a shoulder injury and returned to her country for treatment. After she was dissatisfied with the treatment opportunities in her country and criticized them, she was banned from playing in the national team for 4 years between 2017–2021, on the grounds of indiscipline. Then she was transferred to Volero Zürich.

=== Fenerbahçe (2018) ===
On 29 June 2018, she was transferred to Turkey for Fenerbahçe Opet.

She played in the Chinese League in the first halves of the Sultans League in the 2021, 2022 and 2023 seasons and returned to Fenerbahçe for the second halves of those seasons.

On 10 April 2021, the application made by the Turkish Volleyball Federation for Vargas to obtain citizenship of the Republic of Turkey was approved and President Recep Tayyip Erdoğan presented Melissa Vargas with her TR ID Card.

On 9 July 2024, she renewed her contract with Fenerbahçe Opet for 3 years.

== International career ==
=== Cuba ===
Vargas has limited international experience with Cuba, appearing in the 2014 FIVB Women's World Championship, 2015 FIVB Women's World Cup, and in three editions of the FIVB World Grand Prix.

In 2016, after suffering a shoulder injury while playing for Agel Prostějov, Vargas returned to Cuba for treatment. After finding Cuban facilities lacking, she sought treatment elsewhere, at which point the Cuban Federation imposed a four-year ban on Vargas for what they described as "insulting and undisciplined attitudes toward her country."

=== Turkey ===
After acquiring Turkish citizenship in 2021, Vargas became eligible to represent Turkey in international competition in 2023, after playing for the Turkish volleyball club Fenerbahçe for five seasons.

She debuted with the team at the 2023 FIVB Volleyball Women's Nations League, where she played in 11 matches and won gold medal with the team. She was named MVP and Best Opposite Hitter of the competition.

At the 2023 Women's European Volleyball Championship, Vargas was once again named MVP and Best Opposite Hitter after winning gold with Turkey.

She named Best Opposite Hitter at the 2025 FIVB World Championship after winning silver with Turkey.

== Awards ==
=== Honors ===
==== Club ====
(Czech Republic) Agel Prostějov

- Czech Volleyball Extraliga: (gold) 2015–16
- Czech Cup: (gold) 2015–16

(Switzerland) Volero Zürich

- Swiss Volleyball League A: (gold) 2017–18
- Swiss Cup: (gold) 2017–18

(China) Tianjin Bohai Bank

- FIVB Club World Championship: (bronze) 2023
- Chinese Volleyball Super League: (gold) 2020–21, 2021–22, 2022–23
- National Games of China: (gold) 2021

(Turkey) Fenerbahçe

- FIVB Club World Championship: (bronze) 2021
- CEV Champions League: (bronze) 2018–19, 2021–22, 2022–23, 2023–24
- Turkish Volleyball Sultanlar Ligi: (gold) 2022–23, 2023–24 (silver) 2020–21, 2021–22, 2024–25, 2025–26 (bronze) 2018–19
- Turkish Cup: (gold) 2023–24, 2024–25 (silver) 2018–19, 2021–22, 2022–23
- Turkish Super Cup: (gold) 2022, 2024, 2025 (silver) 2023

==== International ====
Cuba

- U23 Pan-American Cup: (bronze) 2014

Turkey

- FIVB World Championship: (silver) 2025
- FIVB Volleyball World Cup: (gold) 2023
- FIVB Volleyball Nations League: (gold) 2023
- FIVB Volleyball Nations League: (gold) 2026
- European Volleyball Championship: (gold) 2023
- European Volleyball Championship: (gold) 2026

=== Individual ===
- 2023 Turkish Athlete of the Year

==== Club ====
- 2018–19 CEV Champions League – "Best Scorers"
- 2018–19 Turkish Volleyball League – "Best Scorer"
- 2018–19 Turkish Volleyball League – "Best Server"
- 2021–22 Chinese Volleyball League – "Best Server"
- 2020–21 Turkish Volleyball League – "Best Opposite Hitter"
- 2022–23 Chinese Volleyball League – "Best Server"
- 2022–23 Chinese Volleyball League – "Best Scorer"
- 2022–23 Chinese Volleyball League – "Best Spiker"
- 2022–23 Turkish Volleyball League – "Best Opposite Hitter"
- 2022–23 Turkish Volleyball League – "Finals MVP"
- 2023–24 Turkish Volleyball League – "Finals MVP"
- 2023–24 Turkish Cup – "MVP"
- 2024 Turkish Super Cup – "MVP"
- 2024–25 Turkish Cup – "MVP"
- 2025 Turkish Super Cup – "MVP"

==== International ====
- 2013 U20 Pan-American Cup – "Best Spiker"
- 2014 U23 Pan-American Cup – "Best Opposite Hitter"
- 2014 Central American and Caribbean Games – Best Scorer
- 2015 Pan American Games – "Best Outside Hitter"
- 2015 Pan-American Volleyball Cup – "Best Outside Hitter"
- 2015 Pan-American Volleyball Cup – "Best Server"
- 2015 Pan-American Volleyball Cup – "Best Scorer"
- 2023 FIVB Nations League – "Best Opposite Hitter"
- 2023 FIVB Nations League – "MVP"
- 2023 European Volleyball Championship – "Best Opposite Hitter"
- 2023 European Volleyball Championship – "MVP"
- 2024 Summer Olympics – "Best Scorer"
- 2024 FIVB Nations League – "Best Scorer"
- 2024 FIVB Nations League – "Best Server"
- 2025 FIVB World Championship – "Best Opposite Hitter"
- 2025 FIVB World Championship – "Best Scorer"
- 2026 FIVB Women's Volleyball Nations League - "MVP"
- 2026 FIVB Women's Volleyball Nations League – "Best Opposite Hitter"
- 2026 European Volleyball Championship - "Best Opposite"
- 2026 European Volleyball Championship – "MVP"

Awards
Preceded by (Peru) Daniela Uribe	Best Spiker of U20 Pan-American Cup; 2013	Succeeded by Not awarded
Preceded by Not awarded	Best Opposite Hitter of U23 Pan-American Cup; 2014	Succeeded by (Argentina) Daniela Bulaich
Preceded by (Dominican Republic) Bethania de la Cruz (Colombia) Margarita Martínez	Best Outside Hitter of Pan-American Cup; 2015	Succeeded by (United States) Madison Kingdon and (Dominican Republic) Brayelin Martínez
Preceded by (Mexico) Samantha Bricio	Best Scorer of Pan-American Cup; 2015	Succeeded by (Peru) Ángela Leyva
Preceded by (United States) Nicole Fawcett	Best Server of Pan-American Cup; 2015	Succeeded by (Cuba) Diaris Pérez
Preceded by (Italy) Paola Egonu	Most Valuable Player of FIVB Nations League; 2023	Succeeded by (Italy) Paola Egonu
Preceded by (Italy) Paola Egonu	Best Opposite Hitter of FIVB Nations League; 2023	Succeeded by (Italy) Paola Egonu
Preceded by (Italy) Paola Egonu	Most Valuable Player of European Volleyball Championship; 2023; 2026	Succeeded by TBD
Preceded by (Serbia) Tijana Bošković	Best Opposite Hitter of European Volleyball Championship; 2023; 2026	Succeeded by TBD
Preceded by (Italy) Monica De Gennaro	Most Valuable Player of FIVB Nations League; 2026	Succeeded by TBD
