= 2014 Women's U23 Pan-American Volleyball Cup =

Tournament details
- Host country: Peru
- Dates: September 7–13, 2014
- Teams: 8
- Venues: 2 (in Ica and Chincha Alta host cities)

Final positions
- Champions: Dominican Republic (2nd title)

Tournament awards
- MVP: Brayelin Martínez (DOM)

The 2014 Women's U23 Pan-American Volleyball Cup was the second edition of the bi-annual women's volleyball tournament, played by eight countries from September 7–13, 2013 in Ica and Chincha Alta, Peru. At the end of the tournament, the top two teams from NORCECA and the best placed of the CSV qualified for 2015 FIVB Volleyball Women's U23 World Championship, to be held in Ankara, Turkey. Colombia (CSV), Cuba and Dominican Republic (NORCECA) qualified for the World Championship.

== Competing nations ==
Group A	Group B
Argentina; Mexico; Peru; Trinidad and Tobago	Cuba; Colombia; Costa Rica; Dominican Republic

== Pool standing procedure ==
Match won 3–0: 5 points for the winner, 0 point for the loser
Match won 3–1: 4 points for the winner, 1 points for the loser
Match won 3–2: 3 points for the winner, 2 points for the loser
The first criterion is the number of matches won, second criterion is points gained by the team
In case of tie, the teams were classified according to the criteria points ratio and sets ratio.

== Preliminary round ==
- Venues: Ica and Chincha Alta, Peru
- All times are Peruvian Standard Time (UTC−05:00)

=== Pool A (Ica) ===
Pos	Team	Pld	W	L	Pts	SPW	SPL	SPR	SW	SL	SR	Qualification
1	Peru	3	3	0	11	9	4	2.250	9	4	2.250	Semifinals
2	Argentina	3	2	1	12	8	3	2.667	8	3	2.667	Quarterfinals
3	Mexico	3	1	2	7	5	6	0.833	5	6	0.833	Quarterfinals
4	Trinidad and Tobago	3	0	3	0	0	9	0.000	0	9	0.000	

Note: Peru finished with a 3–0 record and 11 points and in front of Argentina (2–1, 12 points).

Date	Time		Score		Set 1	Set 2	Set 3	Set 4	Set 5	Total	Report
7-Sep	16:30	Argentina	3–0	Mexico	25–9	25–22	25–18			75–49	P2P3
7-Sep	19:00	Peru	3–0	Trinidad and Tobago	25–7	25–15	25–18			75–40	P2P3
8-Sep	16:30	Trinidad and Tobago	0–3	Argentina	14–25	10–25	16–25			40–75	P2P3
8-Sep	19:00	Peru	3–2	Mexico	22–25	25–23	23–25	25–23	18–16	113–112	P2P3
9-Sep	16:30	Mexico	3–0	Trinidad and Tobago	25–17	25–13	25–17			75–47	P2P3
9-Sep	19:00	Peru	3–2	Argentina	22–25	25–27	25–22	29–27	15–11	116–112	P2P3

=== Pool B (Chincha Alta) ===
Pos	Team	Pld	W	L	Pts	SPW	SPL	SPR	SW	SL	SR	Qualification
1	Cuba	3	3	0	15	9	0	MAX	9	0	MAX	Semifinals
2	Colombia	3	2	1	8	6	5	1.200	6	5	1.200	Quarterfinals
3	Dominican Republic	3	1	2	7	5	6	0.833	5	6	0.833	Quarterfinals
4	Costa Rica	3	0	3	0	0	9	0.000	0	9	0.000	

Date	Time		Score		Set 1	Set 2	Set 3	Set 4	Set 5	Total	Report
7-Sep	16:30	Cuba	3–0	Colombia	25–20	25–23	25–22			75–65	P2P3
7-Sep	19:00	Costa Rica	0–3	Dominican Republic	8–25	13–25	13–25			34–75	P2P3
8-Sep	16:30	Colombia	3–2	Dominican Republic	20–25	25–19	22–25	27–25	15–6	109–100	P2P3
8-Sep	19:00	Cuba	3–0	Costa Rica	25–10	25–15	25–15			75–40	P2P3
9-Sep	16:30	Colombia	3–0	Costa Rica	25–23	25–21	25–17			75–61	P2P3
9-Sep	19:00	Dominican Republic	0–3	Cuba	25–27	23–25	19–25			67–77	P2P3

== Final round ==
=== Championship bracket (Ica) ===
Quarterfinals
B2	Colombia	3
A3	Mexico	1
A2	Argentina	0
B3	Dominican Republic	3

Semifinals
A1	Peru	1
B2	Colombia	3
B1	Cuba	2
B3	Dominican Republic	3

Finals
B2	Colombia	1
B3	Dominican Republic	3
Third place
A1	Peru	1
B1	Cuba	3

=== 5th to 8th places bracket (Chincha Alta) ===
Semifinals
Argentina	3
Trinidad and Tobago	0
Mexico	3
Costa Rica	0

5th place
Argentina	2
Mexico	3
7th place
Trinidad and Tobago	1
Costa Rica	3

=== Quarterfinals ===
Date	Time		Score		Set 1	Set 2	Set 3	Set 4	Set 5	Total	Report
11-Sep	16:30	Colombia	3–1	Mexico	21–25	25–23	27–25	25–17		98–90	P2P3
11-Sep	19:00	Argentina	0–3	Dominican Republic	17–25	18–25	17–25			52–75	P2P3

=== Classificantion 5th at 8th ===
Date	Time		Score		Set 1	Set 2	Set 3	Set 4	Set 5	Total	Report
12-Sep	18:00	Trinidad and Tobago	0–3	Argentina	11–25	14–25	18–25			43–75	P2P3
12-Sep	20:00	Costa Rica	0–3	Mexico	12–25	18–25	18–25			48–75	P2P3

=== Semifinals ===
Date	Time		Score		Set 1	Set 2	Set 3	Set 4	Set 5	Total	Report
12-Sep	16:30	Cuba	2–3	Dominican Republic	25–18	25–23	24–26	22–25	12–15	108–107	P2P3
12-Sep	19:00	Peru	1–3	Colombia	26–28	26–24	21–25	22–25		95–102	P2P3

=== 7th place ===
Date	Time		Score		Set 1	Set 2	Set 3	Set 4	Set 5	Total	Report
13-Sep	13:00	Trinidad and Tobago	1–3	Costa Rica	25–19	22–25	21–25	17–25		85–94	P2P3

=== 5th place ===
Date	Time		Score		Set 1	Set 2	Set 3	Set 4	Set 5	Total	Report
13-Sep	15:00	Argentina	2–3	Mexico	20–25	25–16	25–23	23–25	13–15	106–104	P2P3

=== 3rd place ===
Date	Time		Score		Set 1	Set 2	Set 3	Set 4	Set 5	Total	Report
13-Sep	18:00	Cuba	3–1	Peru	25–21	25–16	19–25	25–17		94–79	P2P3

=== Final ===
Date	Time		Score		Set 1	Set 2	Set 3	Set 4	Set 5	Total	Report
13-Sep	15:00	Dominican Republic	3–1	Colombia	24–26	27–25	25–23	25–11		101–85	P2P3

== Final standing ==
Rank	Team
1st place, gold medalist(s)	Dominican Republic
2nd place, silver medalist(s)	Colombia
3rd place, bronze medalist(s)	Cuba
4	Peru
5	Mexico
6	Argentina
7	Costa Rica
8	Trinidad and Tobago

Qualified for the 2015 Women's U23 World Championship
Previously qualified for the 2015 Women's U23 World Championship through CSV

2014 Women's U23 Pan-American Cup champions

Dominican Republic
2nd title

Team Roster:

Jineiry Martínez, Gaila González, Vielka Peralta, María Yvett García, Natalia Martínez, María Angelica Hinojosa, Yokaty Pérez, Celenia Toribio, Yonkaira Peña, Larysmer Martínez (L), Lisbeth Rosario,

Brayelin Martínez,
Head Coach: (Brazil) Wagner Pacheco

== Individual awards ==
- Most valuable player
  - Brayelin Martínez (DOM)
- Best scorer
  - Brayelin Martínez (DOM)
- Best spiker
  - Brayelin Martínez (DOM)
  - Camila Hiruela (ARG)
- Best blocker
  - Andrea Urrutia (PER)
  - Jineiry Martínez (DOM)
- Best setter
  - María Marín (COL)
- Best Opposite
  - Melissa Vargas (CUB)
- Best libero
  - Camila Gómez (COL)
- Best digger
  - Camila Gómez (COL)
- Best receiver
  - Camila Gómez (COL)
- Best server
  - Regla Gracia (CUB)
