= Alondra Tapia =

Female volleyball player from the Dominican Republic (born 2004)

Personal information
- Full name: Alondra Denis Tapia Cruz
- Nationality: Dominican
- Born: 19 May 2004 (age 22); La Vega, La Vega
- Height: 1.94 m (6 ft 4 in)
- Spike: 3.35 m (132 in)
- Block: 3.20 m (126 in)

Volleyball information
- Position: Opposite hitter

National team
| 2021– | Dominican Republic |
Honours
Women's volleyball
Representing the Dominican Republic
Pan-American Cup
| Gold medal – first place | 2021 Santo Domingo | Team |
Central American and Caribbean Games
| Gold medal – first place | 2023 San Salvador | Team |
| Gold medal – first place | 2026 Santo Domingo | Team |
U23 Pan American Cup
| Gold medal – first place | 2023 Hermosillo | Team |
| Silver medal – second place | 2024 Xalapa | Team |
Bolivarian Games
| Silver medal – second place | 2022 Valledupar | Team |

Alondra Denis Tapia Cruz (born 19 May 2004 in La Vega) is a Dominican Republic volleyball player who played in the 2024 Summer Olympics.

== Career ==
=== 2019-2022 ===
In 2019, she was recruited by the head coach of Furukawa Gakuen High School from Osaki, Miyagi Prefecture, Norio Okazaki, when he valued her potential and attitude towards volleyball, receiving a scholarship to study there with the help from the Japan International Cooperation Agency and the Dominican Republic Female National Teams Program. She was scheduled to study in Japan until 2023 and play with her school in volleyball tournaments and be able to represent the Dominican Republic at international tournaments as well. She confessed that her role model was Saori Kimura. Besides she faced difficulties, and was homesick, she encouraged herself to go on to become a Caribbean Queen, a member of the senior national team. Her coach sent periodic reports on her progress in the Japanese language and the seriousness of her training and how she was adapting and improving her defense and reception, key factors in the Japanese volleyball system.

Tapia guided Furukawa Gakuen High School to the bronze medal in 2021 during the 73rd All Japan High School Volleyball Championship, when her team lost to Shujitsu in the semifinals, but she could not play at her best due to a knee injury.

She then represented her home country at the FIVB U18 World Championship held in Mexico, helping them to reach the tenth place and cumulating through the eight matches 84 points, for a 10.5 points average, including a 22 points match against Thailand. And debuted with her national senior team during the 2021 Pan-American Cup held in Santo Domingo, serving 2 aces against Cuba. She confessed how nervous she was playing alongside world-class players, but was warmed and supported by her teammates.

At the Japanese 2022 National High School Athletic Meet Volleyball Tournament (Inter-High 2022), she led her school to the Championship game, losing the finals to Kinrankai and earning tournament's Best 6 and Outstanding Player awards. Since 1999 her school have not been to the finals, but at the 2022 74th All Japan High School Volleyball Championship, they won the tournament's silver medal when they lost 1–3 to Shujitsu, Tapia earned one of the Outstanding Player Awards and expressed that felt frustrated because of the second place. after leading her school with 36 points in that final. As a second year student athlete, the team relied on her as their ace, and after the defeat she promised that they will become number one in Japan the next year.

She played the Bolivarian Games with her National Team in Valledupar, Colombia, helping them to win the silver medal of the event after losing 2–3 in their last match against the Colombians.

=== 2023 ===
During her last year of Japanese Scholarship in the Furukawa Gakuen High School, she played in the 74th All Japan High School Volleyball Championship, after leading her school with 17 points in the semifinals, she claimed that she can now converse fluently in Japanese and that she has absorbed her teachings like a sponge and her coached Okazaki said that she had grown the most as a player in these three years. This time she led her school to the championship, helping them with 36 points in the 5 sets final game that help her win the Most Valuable Player award. She expressed how happy she was to show her mom, who travelled from the Dominican Republic to cheer her up, that she became Japan's No.1, the end of three years of hardships for her. She would recall her stay in Japan as a grown experience in both, personal and as an athlete.

After ending her Japanese High School cycle, she returned to play with her national team, taking the gold medal at the Central American and Caribbean Games in El Salvador and the U23 Pan-American Cup, later in Mexico. She then played the FIVB U21 World Championship, helping her national team to reach the 14th place.

=== 2024 ===
Tapia signed with the Peruvian League club Deportivo Géminis, she partnered with fellow Dominicans Florangel Terrero and Lisvel Elisa Eve, leading her team attack during the season, finishing league's Best Scorer with 474 points. and winning the bronze medal with her club.

On 15 June, playing in Hong Kong the third week of the FIVB Nations League, Tapia became one of the four players that have scored 37 points match, during a 5-setter 2–3 defeat against Bulgaria. Her team would end up in eleventh place, not qualifying for the final round. She played the NORCECA Final Six in the Dominican Republic winning the golden medal and the Best Opposite individual award.

She was part of the Dominican Republic national team that finished eight, losing 0–3 to Brazil in the quarterfinals of the 2024 Summer Olympics. Tapia played the senior Pan-American Cup in Mexico, were her national team lost 0-3 the bronze medal match to Colombia, ending in fourth place. During the U23 Pan-American Cup played in Mexico, her home team won the silver medal after losing 1-3 the gold medal match to Cuba, even though, she led her team with 25 points and she was awarded tournament's Best Opposite. They also won a berth for the 2025 Junior Pan American Games.

When Cuban/Turkish player Melissa Vargas decided to play with Fenerbahçe Opet, her Chinese club Tianjin Bohai Bank from the Chinese Volleyball Super League decided to sign Tapia in replacement. With this club she went to the 2024 FIVB Club World Championship were her team settled with the silver medal, after losing 0–3 to the Italian Prosecco Doc Imoco Conegliano in the gold medal match.

=== 2025 ===
In February, she was transferred to the Russian PARI Super League with Lokomotiv Kaliningrad. She later expressed how welcomed she felt with Kaliningrad and that she already knew how strong the Russian championship was. Tapia debuted in the last match of the regular season, a victory over the Krasnodar club. She win the Russian championship, when her club defeated 3–2 to Dynamo-Ak Bars Kazan. They later won the Russian Cup, also defeating Dynamo-Ak Bars Kazan. The club thanked Tapia announcing her departure soon after it.

She played the FIVB Nations League, but her national team ended up in 12th place and could not make it to the final round with 5 victories and 13 points.

Playing in Asunción, Paraguay, Tapia won the Junior Pan Am Games bronze medal, defeating 1–3 to Argentina in their final match. She was named tournament's Best Scorer.

=== 2026 ===
Tapia won the gold medal at the 2026 Central American and Caribbean Games with her national team, the seventh consecutive for her home country.

== Clubs ==
- (Dominican Republic) La Vega (2020)
- (Peru) Deportivo Géminis (2023–2024)
- (China) Tianjin Bohai Bank (2024–2025)
- (Russia) Lokomotiv Kaliningrad (2025)

== Awards ==
=== Individuals ===
- 2022 National High School Athletic Meet Volleyball Tournament "Best 6"
- 2022 National High School Athletic Meet Volleyball Tournament "Outstanding Player Award"
- 2022 73rd All Japan High School Volleyball Championship "Outstanding Player Award"
- 2023 74th All Japan High School Volleyball Championship "Most Valuable Player"
- 2023 74th All Japan High School Volleyball Championship "Outstanding Player Award"
- 2023/24 Peruvian League "Best Scorer"
- 2024 NORCECA Final Six "Best Opposite"
- 2024 U23 Pan-American Cup "Best Opposite"
- 2025 Junior Pan American Games "Best Scorer"

=== Clubs ===
- 2023/24 Peruvian League – Bronze medal, with Deportivo Géminis de Comas
- 2024 FIVB Club World Championship – Runner-Up, with Tianjin Bohai Bank
- 2025 Russian PARI Super League – Champion, with Lokomotiv Kaliningrad
- 2025 Russian Cup – Champion, with Lokomotiv Kaliningrad
