= Ariana Rodríguez =

Dominican Republic volleyball player (born 2005)

Personal information
- Full name: Ariana Rodríguez Fung
- Nationality: Dominican
- Born: 3 November 2005 (age 20); New York City, United States
- Hometown: Miami
- Height: 1.84 m (6 ft 0 in)
- Weight: 67 kg (148 lb)
- Spike: 291 cm (115 in)
- Block: 283 cm (111 in)
- Education: University of Miami

Volleyball information
- Position: Setter

National team
2023–	Dominican Republic
Honours
Women's volleyball
Representing the Dominican Republic
U23 Pan American Cup
Gold medal – first place	2023 Hermosillo	Team
Bolivarian Games
Silver medal – second place	2022 Valledupar	Team

Ariana Rodríguez Fung (born 3 November 2005) is a Dominican Republic volleyball player who played the 2024 Summer Olympics.

== Personal life ==
Rodríguez is 184 cm (6 ft 0 in) tall 67 kilograms (148 lb), born on 3 November 2005, in New York City, United States. Her parents are Dominican Elvis Rodríguez, who played volleyball professionally for seven years in Switzerland, former AVP player, Dominican national team member and coach and Dominican Chinese Suquin Fung, collegiate and Dominican League volleyball player and coach. She went to Poly Prep Country Day School in New York, winning two NYSAIS championships, first team, all-league and Most Valuable Player and is studying at University of Miami.

== Career ==
=== 2021 ===
Rodríguez played with her national team the 2021 FIVB Women's U20 World Championship, finishing with her team in the eight place after losing 0–3 to Brazil.

=== 2022 ===
Rodríguez played the Bolivarian Games with her National Team in Valledupar, Colombia, helping them to win the silver medal of the event after losing 2–3 in their last match against the Colombians. She won with the Dominican Republic the U19 Pan American Cup bronze medal and the Best server award.

=== 2023 ===
Playing with her national Youth team, she played the U19 Pan American Cup where her team finished in fifth place and she was selected Best scorer and Best Server. At the U21 Pan-American Cup held in Nogales, Mexico, she played as an opposite, even though her team lost the bronze medal to Cuba, she was awarded the Best Opposite. She was among the preliminary roster for the Nations League, but never make it to the main team.

Rodríguez won the gold medal at the U23 Pan-American Cup winning the Best Setter and Most Valuable Player awards. In August, she played the U19 World Championship and help her national team to rank in 13th place with a 29 points match. While she was playing as an outside hitter instead of her usual role of setter, she received the call to play with her Senior National Team for the upcoming Olympic qualifier. She was part of the team that played the Olympic Qualification Tournament where her team won a berth for the 2024 Summer Olympics after winning the Pool A and qualifying for the fourth time to the Olympics.

=== 2024 ===
She traveled to Brazil to take part of the Nations League. Her team ended with a 2–9 mark and did not qualify for the final round. She then played at the NORCECA U21 Volleyball Continental Championship and helped her team to win the bronze medal and was awarded tournament's Best Server. She confessed that she was living an olympic dream, when she joined her national team at the 2024 Summer Olympics, when the Dominican Republic finished eight, losing 0–3 to Brazil in the quarterfinals.

== Awards ==
=== Individuals ===
- 2022 U19 Pan American Cup "Best Server"
- 2023 U19 Pan American Cup "Best Scorer"
- 2023 U19 Pan American Cup "Best Server"
- 2023 U21 Pan American Cup "Best Opposite"
- 2023 U23 Pan-American Cup "Most Valuable Player"
- 2023 U23 Pan-American Cup "Best Setter"
- 2024 U21 NORCECA Championship "Best Server"
