= Regla Gracia =

Cuban volleyball player

Personal information
- Full name: Regla Rainierys Gracia Gonzalez
- Nationality: Cuban
- Born: 28 May 1993 (age 33)
- Height: 1.77 m (5 ft 10 in)
- Weight: 67 kg (148 lb)
- Spike: 301 cm (119 in)
- Block: 282 cm (111 in)

Career
| Years | Teams |
|---|---|
| 2014 | Camagüey |

Regla Rainierys Gracia Gonzalez (born 28 May 1993) is a Cuban female volleyball player. She is a member of the Cuba women's national volleyball team and played for Camagüey in 2014.

== Career ==
She was part of the Cuban national team at the 2014 FIVB Volleyball Women's World Championship in Italy, and at the 2015 FIVB World Grand Prix.

She won the Best Server award in the 2014 U23 Pan-American Cup.

== Clubs ==
- (Cuba) Camagüey (2014)

2022-2023 Club Voleibol Astillero

== Awards ==
=== Individuals ===
- 2014 U23 Pan-American Cup "Best Server"
