= María Yvett García =

Dominican Republic volleyball player (born 1996)

Personal information
- Full name: Maria Yvett Garcia De La Cruz
- Nationality: Dominican
- Born: July 4, 1996 (age 30)
- Height: 1.84 m (6 ft 0 in)
- Weight: 71 kg (157 lb)
- Spike: 296 cm (117 in)
- Block: 265 cm (104 in)
- Education: Florida A&M

Volleyball information
- Position: Middle blocker

National team
2015-	Dominican Republic
Honours
Women's volleyball
Representing the Dominican Republic

Maria Yvett Garcia De La Cruz (born 4 July 1996) is a Dominican volleyball player.

She played for the Dominican Republic national team at the 2015 FIVB World Grand Prix.

She played for Florida A&M.

== Clubs ==
- (Dominican Republic) Mirador (2015)
