= Diaris Pérez =

Cuban volleyball player

Personal information
- Full name: Diaris de la Caridad Perez Ramos
- Nationality: Cuban
- Born: 16 November 1998 (age 27)
- Height: 1.82 m (6 ft 0 in)
- Weight: 75 kg (165 lb)
- Spike: 304 cm (120 in)
- Block: 295 cm (116 in)

Career
Years	Teams
2017	La Habana
2020	Chamalieres

Diaris de la Caridad Perez Ramos (Note: In this Spanish name, the first or paternal surname is Perez and the second or maternal family name is Ramos.) (born 16 November 1998) is a Cuban female volleyball player. She is a member of the Cuba women's national volleyball team and played for La Habana in 2017.

== Career ==
She was part of the Cuban national team at the 2015 FIVB Volleyball Women's U23 World Championship, and 2018 FIVB Volleyball Women's World Championship.

== Clubs ==
- (Cuba) La Habana (2017)
- (France) Chamalieres (2020)
