= 2016 Women's U23 Pan-American Volleyball Cup =

Tournament details
- Host country: Peru
- Dates: September 19–25, 2016
- Teams: 6
- Venues: 3 (in 2 host cities)

Final positions
- Champions: Dominican Republic (3rd title)

Tournament awards
- MVP: Brayelin Martínez (DOM)

The 2016 Women's U23 Pan-American Volleyball Cup was the third edition of the bi-annual volleyball tournament. It was held in Miraflores and San Vicente de Cañete, Peru from 19 to 25 September among six countries. The Dominican Republic won the tournament for third time and qualified for the 2017 FIVB U23 World Championship along with silver medalists Argentina and Cuba, winners of the bronze medal. Dominican Republic player Brayelin Martínez won the Most Valuable Player award.

== Competing nations ==
Round robin

Argentina
Costa Rica
Cuba
Dominican Republic
Peru
Trinidad and Tobago

== Preliminary round ==
- All times are in Peru Time (UTC−05:00)

=== Round robin ===
Pos	Team	Pld	W	L	Pts	SPW	SPL	SPR	SW	SL	SR	Qualification
1	Dominican Republic	5	4	1	21	391	270	1.448	13	3	4.333	Semifinals
2	Argentina	5	4	1	20	457	343	1.332	14	5	2.800	Semifinals
3	Peru	5	4	1	16	427	351	1.217	12	7	1.714	Semifinals
4	Cuba	5	2	3	13	397	367	1.082	9	9	1.000	Semifinals
5	Costa Rica	5	1	4	4	246	374	0.658	3	13	0.231	
6	Trinidad and Tobago	5	0	5	1	182	395	0.461	1	15	0.067	

Date	Time		Score		Set 1	Set 2	Set 3	Set 4	Set 5	Total	Report
19 Sep	12:30	Dominican Republic	3–0	Trinidad and Tobago	25–13	25–9	25–8			75–30	P2 P3
19 Sep	14:30	Cuba	1–3	Argentina	21–25	25–18	18–25	22–25		86–93	P2 P3
19 Sep	17:00	Peru	3–0	Costa Rica	25–11	25–13	25–11			75–35	P2 P3
20 Sep	12:30	Costa Rica	0–3	Cuba	20–25	17–25	18–25			55–75	P2 P3
20 Sep	14:30	Dominican Republic	1–3	Argentina	25–21	17–25	27–29	22–25		91–100	P2 P3
20 Sep	17:00	Peru	3–0	Trinidad and Tobago	25–11	25–6	25–7			75–24	P2 P3
21 Sep	12:30	Trinidad and Tobago	1–3	Costa Rica	13–25	16–25	25–20	20–25		74–95	P2 P3
21 Sep	14:30	Dominican Republic	3–0	Cuba	25–21	25–18	25–19			75–58	P2 P3
21 Sep	17:00	Peru	3–2	Argentina	17–25	26–24	23–25	27–25	17–15	110–114	P2 P3
22 Sep	12:30	Argentina	3–0	Trinidad and Tobago	25–12	25–4	25–6			75–22	P2 P3
22 Sep	14:30	Costa Rica	0–3	Dominican Republic	11–25	5–25	11–25			27–75	P2 P3
22 Sep	17:00	Peru	3–2	Cuba	22–25	22–25	25–22	25–15	18–16	112–103	P2 P3
23 Sep	12:30	Costa Rica	0–3	Argentina	7–25	16–25	11–25			34–75	P2 P3
23 Sep	14:30	Trinidad and Tobago	0–3	Cuba	11–25	9–25	12–25			32–75	P2 P3
23 Sep	17:00	Peru	0–3	Dominican Republic	21–25	17–25	17–25			55–75	P2 P3

== Final round ==
=== Championship bracket ===
Semifinals
Argentina	3
Peru	1
Dominican Republic	3
Cuba	0

Third place
Argentina	0
Dominican Republic	3
Final
Peru	2
Cuba	3

=== Semifinals ===
Date	Time		Score		Set 1	Set 2	Set 3	Set 4	Set 5	Total	Report
24 Sep	16:30	Dominican Republic	3–0	Cuba	25–17	25–20	25–20			75–57	P2 P3
24 Sep	19:00	Argentina	3–1	Peru	26–28	25–21	25–20	25–20		101–89	P2 P3

=== Fifth place match ===
Date	Time		Score		Set 1	Set 2	Set 3	Set 4	Set 5	Total	Report
24 Sep	14:00	Costa Rica	3–0	Trinidad and Tobago	25–23	25–16	25–14			75–53	P2 P3

=== Bronze medal match ===
Date	Time		Score		Set 1	Set 2	Set 3	Set 4	Set 5	Total	Report
25 Sep	15:30	Peru	2–3	Cuba	14–25	19–25	25–16	25–12	8–15	91–93	P2 P3

=== Final ===
Date	Time		Score		Set 1	Set 2	Set 3	Set 4	Set 5	Total	Report
25 Sep	18:00	Argentina	0–3	Dominican Republic	21–25	19–25	19–25			59–75	P2 P3

== Final standing ==
Rank	Team
1st place, gold medalist(s)	Dominican Republic
2nd place, silver medalist(s)	Argentina
3rd place, bronze medalist(s)	Cuba
4	Peru
5	Costa Rica
6	Trinidad and Tobago

Qualified for the 2017 Women's U23 World Championship

2016 Women's U23 Pan-American Cup champions

Dominican Republic
3rd title

Team Roster:

Jineiry Martínez, Winifer Fernández (L), Gaila González, Pamela Jorge, Natalia Martínez, Angelica Hinojosa, Geraldine González, Madeline Guillén, Yokaty Pérez, Vielka Peralta, Larysmer Martínez, Camila de la Rosa, Lisbeth Rosario,

Brayelin Martínez
Head Coach: (Brazil) Wagner Pacheco

== Individual awards ==
- Most valuable player
  - Brayelin Martínez (DOM)
- Best scorer
  - Ángela Leyva (PER)
- Best spiker
  - Ángela Leyva (PER)
  - Brayelin Martínez (DOM)
- Best Middle Blocker
  - Candelaria Herrera (ARG)
  - Yelennis Díaz (CUB)
- Best setter
  - Gretell Moreno (CUB)
- Best Opposite
  - Daniela Bulaich (ARG)
- Best libero
  - Antonela Fortuna (ARG)
- Best digger
  - Winifer Fernández (DOM)
- Best receiver
  - Sol Piccolo (ARG)
- Best server
  - Diaris Pérez (CUB)
