= 2012 Women's U23 Pan-American Volleyball Cup =

Tournament details
- Host country: Peru
- Dates: September 3–8, 2012
- Teams: 8
- Venue: 1 (in Callao host cities)

Final positions
- Champions: Dominican Republic (1st title)

Tournament awards
- MVP: Yonkaira Peña (DOM)

The 2012 Women's U23 Pan-American Volleyball Cup was the first edition of the bi-annual women's volleyball tournament, played by eight countries from September 3–8, 2012 in Callao, Peru.

== Competing nations ==
Group A	Group B
Argentina; Brazil; Colombia; Cuba	Canada; Costa Rica; Dominican Republic; Peru

== Pool standing procedure ==
Match won 3–0: 5 points for the winner, 0 point for the loser
Match won 3–1: 4 points for the winner, 1 points for the loser
Match won 3–2: 3 points for the winner, 2 points for the loser
The first criterion is the number of matches won, second criterion is points gained by the team
In case of tie, the teams were classified according to the criteria points ratio and sets ratio

== Preliminary round ==
- Venue: Miguel Grau Colisseum, Callao, Peru
- All times are Peruvian Standard Time (UTC−05:00)

=== Group A ===
Pos	Team	Pld	W	L	Pts	SPW	SPL	SPR	SW	SL	SR	Qualification
1	Brazil	3	3	0	13	272	212	1.283	9	2	4.500	Semifinals
2	Argentina	3	2	1	7	271	262	1.034	6	6	1.000	Quarterfinals
3	Cuba	3	1	2	7	219	253	0.866	5	6	0.833	Quarterfinals
4	Colombia	3	0	3	3	251	287	0.875	3	9	0.333	

Date	Time		Score		Set 1	Set 2	Set 3	Set 4	Set 5	Total	Report
3 Sep	14:30	Brazil	3–1	Colombia	25–19	21–25	27–25	25–20		98–89	P2P3
3 Sep	16:30	Cuba	1–3	Argentina	25–22	25–27	14–25	15–25		79–99	P2P3
4 Sep	14:30	Cuba	3–0	Colombia	25–18	25–17	25–21			75–56	P2P3
4 Sep	16:30	Brazil	3–0	Argentina	25–18	25–16	26–24			76–58	P2P3
5 Sep	14:30	Argentina	3–2	Colombia	23–25	25–21	22–25	25–18	19–17	114–106	P2P3
5 Sep	16:30	Brazil	3–1	Cuba	23–25	25–15	25–8	25–17		98–65	P2P3

=== Group B ===
Pos	Team	Pld	W	L	Pts	SPW	SPL	SPR	SW	SL	SR	Qualification
1	Dominican Republic	3	3	0	14	243	165	1.473	9	1	9.000	Semifinals
2	Peru	3	2	1	10	259	205	1.263	7	4	1.750	Quarterfinals
3	Canada	3	1	2	6	208	219	0.950	4	6	0.667	Quarterfinals
4	Costa Rica	2	0	2	0	104	225	0.462	0	6	0.000	

Date	Time		Score		Set 1	Set 2	Set 3	Set 4	Set 5	Total	Report
3 Sep	18:30	Dominican Republic	3–0	Canada	25–14	25–13	25–20			75–47	P2P3
3 Sep	20:30	Peru	3–0	Costa Rica	25–8	25–10	25–8			75–26	P2P3
4 Sep	18:30	Dominican Republic	3–0	Costa Rica	25–6	25–8	25–17			75–31	P2P3
4 Sep	20:30	Peru	3–1	Canada	25–15	21–25	26–24	25–22		97–86	P2P3
5 Sep	18:30	Canada	3–0	Costa Rica	25–16	25–15	25–18			75–49	P2P3
5 Sep	20:30	Peru	1–3	Dominican Republic	23–25	19–25	25–18	20–25		87–93	P2P3

== Final round ==
=== Championship bracket ===
Quarterfinals
A2	Argentina	3
B3	Canada	0
B2	Peru	3
A3	Cuba	1

Semifinals
B1	Dominican Republic	3
A2	Argentina	1
A1	Brazil	3
B2	Peru	0

Finals
B1	Dominican Republic	3
A1	Brazil	0
Third place
A2	Argentina	3
B2	Peru	1

=== 5th to 8th places bracket ===
Semifinals
Colombia	0
Canada	3
Costa Rica	0
Cuba	3

Final
Canada	2
Cuba	3
Third place
Colombia	3
Costa Rica	0

=== Quarterfinals ===
Date	Time		Score		Set 1	Set 2	Set 3	Set 4	Set 5	Total	Report
6 Sep	16:30	Argentina	3–0	Canada	25-19	25-19	25-16			75–0	P2P3
6 Sep	20:30	Peru	3–1	Cuba	15–25	25–18	25–20	25–22		90–85	P2P3

=== Classification 5th to 8th ===
Date	Time		Score		Set 1	Set 2	Set 3	Set 4	Set 5	Total	Report
7 Sep	14:30	Colombia	0–3	Canada	23–25	23–25	20–25			66–75	P2P3
7 Sep	18:30	Costa Rica	0–3	Cuba	14–25	8–25	7–25			29–75	P2P3

=== Semifinals ===
Date	Time		Score		Set 1	Set 2	Set 3	Set 4	Set 5	Total	Report
7 Sep	16:30	Dominican Republic	3–1	Argentina	25–17	25–17	26–28	25–20		101–82	P2P3
7 Sep	20:30	Brazil	3–0	Peru	26–24	25–20	25–18			76–62	P2P3

=== 7th place match ===
Date	Time		Score		Set 1	Set 2	Set 3	Set 4	Set 5	Total	Report
8 Sep	13:00	Colombia	3–0	Costa Rica	25–17	25–16	25–9			75–42	P2P3

=== 5th place match ===
Date	Time		Score		Set 1	Set 2	Set 3	Set 4	Set 5	Total	Report
8 Sep	15:00	Canada	2–3	Cuba	25–16	24–26	18–25	25–22	7–15	99–104	P2P3

=== 3rd place match ===
Date	Time		Score		Set 1	Set 2	Set 3	Set 4	Set 5	Total	Report
8 Sep	19:00	Argentina	3–1	Peru	20–25	25–14	25–16	25–20		95–75	P2P3

=== Final ===
Date	Time		Score		Set 1	Set 2	Set 3	Set 4	Set 5	Total	Report
8 Sep	17:00	Dominican Republic	3–0	Brazil	25–19	25–16	25–19			75–54	P2P3

== Final standing ==
Rank	Team
1st place, gold medalist(s)	Dominican Republic
2nd place, silver medalist(s)	Brazil
3rd place, bronze medalist(s)	Argentina
4	Peru
5	Cuba
6	Canada
7	Colombia
8	Costa Rica

2012 Women's U23 Pan-American Cup champions

Dominican Republic
1st title

Team Roster:

Winifer Fernández, Lisvel Eve, Marianne Fersola, Brenda Castillo (L), Pamela Soriano, Niverka Marte, Cándida Arias, Jeoselyna Rodríguez, Celenia Toribio, Yonkaira Peña, Galia González,

Brayelin Martínez,
Head Coach: (Brazil) Marcos Kwiek

== Individual awards ==
- Most valuable player
  - Yonkaira Peña (DOM)
- Best scorer
  - Lucía Fresco (ARG)
- Best spiker
  - Gabriela Guimarães (BRA)
- Best blocker
  - Cándida Arias (DOM)
- Best server
  - Kelci French (CAN)
- Best digger
  - Brenda Castillo (DOM)
- Best setter
  - Antonela Curatola (ARG)
- Best receiver
  - Juliana Filipeli Paes (BRA)
- Best libero
  - Jazmín Molli (ARG)
