= Peru women's national under-23 volleyball team =

Peru
- Association: Peruvian Volleyball Federation
- Confederation: CSV

Uniforms
Home	Away

FIVB U23 World Championship
- Appearances: 1 (First in 2015)
- Best result: 9th place : (2015)

South America U22 Championship
- Appearances: 2 (First in 2014)
- Best result: (bronze) Bronze : (2014, 2016).

The Peru women's national under-23 volleyball team represents Peru in women's under-23 volleyball events, it is controlled and managed by the Peruvian Volleyball Federation that is a member of South American volleyball body Confederación Sudamericana de Voleibol (CSV) and the international volleyball body government the Fédération Internationale de Volleyball (FIVB).

== Results ==
=== FIVB U23 World Championship ===
Champions Runners up Third place Fourth place

FIVB U23 World Championship
Year	Round	Position	Pld	W	L	SW	SL	Squad
(Mexico) 2013	Didn't Qualify							
(Turkey) 2015		9th place						Squad
(Slovenia) 2017	Didn't Qualify							
Total	0 Titles	1/3						

=== U23 Pan American Cup ===
Champions Runners up Third place Fourth place

U23 Pan American Cup
Year	Round	Position	Pld	W	L	SW	SL	Squad
(Peru) 2012	Semifinals	4th place						Squad
(Peru) 2014	Semifinals	4th place						Squad
(Peru) 2016	Semifinals	4th place						Squad
(Peru) 2018	Final	2nd place						Squad
(Mexico) 2021	Did not enter							
Total	0 Titles	4/5						

=== South America U22 Championship ===
Champions Runners up Third place Fourth place

South America U22 Championship
Year	Round	Position	GP	MW	ML	SW	SL	Squad
(Colombia) 2014	Semifinals	Third place						Squad
(Peru) 2016	Semifinals	Third place						Squad
Total	0 Titles	2/2						

== Team ==
=== Current squad ===
The following is the Peruvian roster in the 2022

Head Coach: Francisco Hervás

No.	Name	Date of birth	Height	Weight	Spike	Block	2018 club
1	Yadhira Anchante	19 November 2002	1.80 m (5 ft 11 in)	59 kg (130 lb)	286 cm (113 in)	290 cm (110 in)	(United States) Marquette University
3	Maria Paula Rodriguez	17 March 2003	1.87 m (6 ft 2 in)	60 kg (130 lb)	305 cm (120 in)	300 cm (120 in)	(United States) Florida SouthWestern State College
4	Alondra Alarcon	24 September 2004	1.80 m (5 ft 11 in)	68 kg (150 lb)	300 cm (120 in)	290 cm (110 in)	(Peru) Jaamsa
5	Ariana Arciniega	14 September 2000	1.80 m (5 ft 11 in)	71 kg (157 lb)	280 cm (110 in)	285 cm (112 in)	(United States) MidAmerica Nazarene University
8	Giulia Moltalbetti	17 May 2001	1.83 m (6 ft 0 in)	82 kg (181 lb)	290 cm (110 in)	286 cm (113 in)	(Peru) Regatas Lima
9	Aixa Vigil	23 September 2001	1.85 m (6 ft 1 in)	68 kg (150 lb)	285 cm (112 in)	290 cm (110 in)	(Peru) Alianza Lima
11	Kiara Montes	13 January 2001	1.78 m (5 ft 10 in)	66 kg (146 lb)	300 cm (120 in)	293 cm (115 in)	(Peru) Regatas Lima
12	Yohmara Rivera	19 March 2002	1.78 m (5 ft 10 in)	68 kg (150 lb)	285 cm (112 in)	270 cm (110 in)	(Peru) Jaamsa
14	Evadelaida Talavera	23 January 2002	1.68 m (5 ft 6 in)	60 kg (130 lb)	275 cm (108 in)	260 cm (100 in)	(Peru) Regatas Lima
15	Lizangela Lopez	21 April 2003	1.87 m (6 ft 2 in)	60 kg (130 lb)	295 cm (116 in)	280 cm (110 in)	(United States) Trinity Valley Community College
16	Kiara Vicente	21 April 2003	1.78 m (5 ft 10 in)	60 kg (130 lb)	295 cm (116 in)	280 cm (110 in)	(Peru) Circolo Sportivo Italiano
17	Flavia Montes (C)	22 November 2000	1.87 m (6 ft 2 in)	60 kg (130 lb)	295 cm (116 in)	290 cm (110 in)	(Peru) Universidad San Martín
18	Maria Jose Rojas	12 July 2003	1.75 m (5 ft 9 in)	60 kg (130 lb)	275 cm (108 in)	260 cm (100 in)	(Peru) Jaamsa
19	Carolina Milla	2 December 2002	1.76 m (5 ft 9 in)	60 kg (130 lb)	276 cm (109 in)	266 cm (105 in)	(Peru) Alianza Lima
20	Andrea Calderon	2 October 2002	1.64 m (5 ft 5 in)	60 kg (130 lb)	265 cm (104 in)	260 cm (100 in)	(United States) Chicago State University
23	Thaisa Mc Leod	1 January 2002	1.89 m (6 ft 2 in)	75 kg (165 lb)	301 cm (119 in)	305 cm (120 in)	(Peru) Regatas Lima

=== Notable players ===
- Angela Leyva
- Maguilaura Frias
- Vivian Baella
- Daniela Uribe
- Andrea Urrutia
- Clarivett Yllescas
