= Women's U23 Pan-American Volleyball Cup =

Bi-annual volleyball tournament

The Women's U23 Pan-American Volleyball Cup is a bi-annual Continental Cup organized by NORCECA for U23 teams from all over America (North-, South- and Central America, and the Caribbean).

== Results ==
U23 Pan-American Cup
| Year | Host | Champion | Runner-up | 3rd place | 4th place |
|---|---|---|---|---|---|
| 2012; Details | Callao, Peru | Dominican Republic | Brazil | Argentina | Peru |
| 2014; Details | Ica, Peru | Dominican Republic | Colombia | Cuba | Peru |
| 2016; Details | Lima/Cañete, Peru | Dominican Republic | Argentina | Cuba | Peru |
| 2018; Details | Lima, Peru | Dominican Republic | Peru | Cuba | Mexico |
| 2021; Details | Aguascalientes, Mexico | Dominican Republic | Mexico | Puerto Rico | Suriname |
| 2023; Details | Hermosillo, Mexico | Dominican Republic | Mexico | Argentina | Peru |
| 2024; Details | León, Mexico | Cuba | Dominican Republic | Mexico | Chile |
| 2025; Details | León, Mexico | United States | Canada | Mexico | Cuba |
| 2026; Details | Managua, Nicaragua | United States | Dominican Republic | Canada | Mexico |

== Medal table ==
| Rank | Nation | Gold | Silver | Bronze | Total |
|---|---|---|---|---|---|
| 1 | Dominican Republic | 6 | 2 | 0 | 8 |
| 2 | United States | 2 | 0 | 0 | 2 |
| 3 | Cuba | 1 | 0 | 3 | 4 |
| 4 | Mexico | 0 | 2 | 2 | 4 |
| 5 | Argentina | 0 | 1 | 2 | 3 |
| 6 | Canada | 0 | 1 | 1 | 2 |
| 7 | Brazil | 0 | 1 | 0 | 1 |
| 7 | Colombia | 0 | 1 | 0 | 1 |
| 7 | Peru | 0 | 1 | 0 | 1 |
| 10 | Puerto Rico | 0 | 0 | 1 | 1 |
| Totals (10 entries) | | 9 | 9 | 9 | 27 |

== Participating nations ==
| Nation | (Peru) 2012 | (Peru) 2014 | (Peru) 2016 | (Peru) 2018 | (Mexico) 2021 | (Mexico) 2023 | (Mexico) 2024 | (Mexico) 2025 | (Nicaragua) 2026 | Years |
|---|---|---|---|---|---|---|---|---|---|---|
| Argentina | 3rd | 6th | 2nd | – | – | 3rd | – | – | – | 4 |
| Brazil | 2nd | – | – | – | – | – | – | – | – | 1 |
| Canada | 6th | – | – | – | – | 5th | – | 2nd | 3rd | 4 |
| Chile | – | – | – | 6th | – | – | 4th | – | – | 2 |
| Colombia | 7th | 2nd | – | 5th | – | – | – | – | – | 3 |
| Costa Rica | 8th | 7th | 5th | 8th | 5th | 8th | 6th | 7th | 5th | 9 |
| Cuba | 5th | 3rd | 3rd | 3rd | – | 6th | 1st | 4th | – | 7 |
| Dominican Republic | 1st | 1st | 1st | 1st | 1st | 1st | 2nd | 5th | 2nd | 9 |
| Guatemala | – | – | – | 7th | 6th | – | – | – | – | 2 |
| Honduras | – | – | – | – | – | 7th | – | – | – | 1 |
| Mexico | – | 5th | – | 4th | 2nd | 2nd | 3rd | 3rd | 4th | 7 |
| Nicaragua | – | – | – | – | – | – | 7th | 6th | 6th | 3 |
| Peru | 4th | 4th | 4th | 2nd | – | 4th | 5th | – | – | 6 |
| Puerto Rico | – | – | – | – | 3rd | – | – | – | – | 1 |
| Suriname | – | – | – | – | 4th | – | 8th | 8th | – | 3 |
| Trinidad and Tobago | – | 8th | 6th | – | 7th | – | – | – | – | 3 |
| United States | – | – | – | – | – | – | – | 1st | 1st | 2 |
| Total | 8 | 8 | 6 | 8 | 7 | 8 | 8 | 8 | 6 | |

== Most valuable player by edition ==
- 2012 – (Dominican Republic) Yonkaira Peña
- 2014 – (Dominican Republic) Brayelin Martínez
- 2016 – (Dominican Republic) Brayelin Martínez
- 2018 – (Dominican Republic) Gaila González
- 2021 – (Dominican Republic) Madeline Guillén
- 2023 – (Dominican Republic) Ariana Rodríguez
- 2024 – (Cuba) Lisania Grafort
- 2025 – (United States) Ifennamaka Cos-Okpalla
- 2026 – (United States) Tessa Larkin

== See also ==
- Women's Pan-American Volleyball Cup
- Women's Junior Pan-American Volleyball Cup
- Girls' Youth Pan-American Volleyball Cup
