= Argentina women's national under-23 volleyball team =

Youth volleyball team representing Argentina

Argentina
- Association: Federación del Voleibol Argentino
- Confederation: CSV

Uniforms
Home	Away

FIVB U23 World Championship
- Appearances: 2 (First in 2013)
- Best result: 10th Place : (2013)

South America U22 Championship
- Appearances: 2 (First in 2014)
- Best result: 4th place : (2014, 2016).
- feva.org.ar

The Argentina women's national under-23 volleyball team represents Argentina in women's under-23 volleyball events, it is controlled and managed by the Argentine Volleyball Federation that is a member of South American volleyball body Confederación Sudamericana de Voleibol (CSV) and the international volleyball body government the Fédération Internationale de Volleyball (FIVB).

== Results ==
=== FIVB U23 World Championship ===
Champions Runners up Third place Fourth place

FIVB U23 World Championship
Year	Round	Position	Pld	W	L	SW	SL	Squad
(Mexico) 2013		10th place						Squad
(Turkey) 2015	Didn't Qualify							
(Slovenia) 2017		11th place						Squad
Total	0 Titles	2/3						

=== South America U22 Championship ===
Champions Runners up Third place Fourth place

South America U22 Championship
Year	Round	Position	GP	MW	ML	SW	SL	Squad
(Colombia) 2014	Semifinals	4th place						Squad
(Peru) 2016	Semifinals	4th place						Squad
Total	0 Titles	2/2						

=== U23 Pan American Cup ===
Champions Runners up Third place Fourth place

U23 Pan American Cup
Year	Round	Position	Pld	W	L	SW	SL	Squad
(Peru) 2012	Semifinals	Third place						Squad
(Peru) 2014		6th place						Squad
(Peru) 2016	Final	Runners-Up						Squad
Total	0 Titles	3/3						

== Team ==
=== Current squad ===
The following is the Argentine roster in the 2017 FIVB Women's U23 World Championship.

Head coach: Martín López

No.	Name	Date of birth	Height	Weight	Spike	Block	2016–2017 club
2	Barbara Frangella	17 February 1996	1.79 m (5 ft 10 in)	68 kg (150 lb)	289 cm (114 in)	280 cm (110 in)	(Argentina) Boca Juniors
3	Mariana Moriondo	2 December 1995	1.73 m (5 ft 8 in)	69 kg (152 lb)	268 cm (106 in)	260 cm (100 in)	(Argentina) San Lorenzo de Almagro
4	Martina Guastavino	18 July 1995	1.80 m (5 ft 11 in)	70 kg (150 lb)	285 cm (112 in)	275 cm (108 in)	(Argentina) River Plate
5	Agnes Victoria Tosi	1 July 1999	1.82 m (6 ft 0 in)	69 kg (152 lb)	283 cm (111 in)	273 cm (107 in)	(Argentina) Echaque – Parana
7	Azul Benitez	5 February 1998	1.65 m (5 ft 5 in)	60 kg (130 lb)	260 cm (100 in)	245 cm (96 in)	(Argentina) Mar Chiquita
8	Sol Piccolo	11 September 1996	1.84 m (6 ft 0 in)	74 kg (163 lb)	294 cm (116 in)	282 cm (111 in)	(Argentina) Vélez Sarsfield
10	Anahi Florencia Tosi	10 July 1998	1.81 m (5 ft 11 in)	60 kg (130 lb)	290 cm (110 in)	272 cm (107 in)	(Argentina) 9 de Julio – Freyre
12	Irene Verasio	14 July 1996	1.78 m (5 ft 10 in)	59 kg (130 lb)	283 cm (111 in)	271 cm (107 in)	(Argentina) Sonder Volley
15	Antonela Fortuna (c)	10 May 1995	1.75 m (5 ft 9 in)	61 kg (134 lb)	285 cm (112 in)	275 cm (108 in)	(Argentina) San Lorenzo de Almagro
17	Micaela Esperon	2 April 1995	1.70 m (5 ft 7 in)	58 kg (128 lb)	255 cm (100 in)	245 cm (96 in)	(Argentina) Atlético Vélez Sarsfield
22	Camila Hiruela Tapia	1 February 1997	1.76 m (5 ft 9 in)	77 kg (170 lb)	287 cm (113 in)	280 cm (110 in)	(Argentina) River Plate
23	Daniela Bulaich Simian	5 September 1997	1.72 m (5 ft 8 in)	53 kg (117 lb)	274 cm (108 in)	263 cm (104 in)	(Argentina) Boca Juniors
