= Angélica Hinojosa =

Dominican volleyball player (born 1997)

Personal information
- Full name: Angélica Maria Hinojosa Diaz
- Nationality: Dominican
- Born: 10 January 1997 (age 29)
- Height: 186 cm (73 in)
- Weight: 72 kg (159 lb)
- Spike: 305 cm (120 in)
- Block: 279 cm (110 in)

Volleyball information
- Number: 9 (national team)

Career
Years	Teams
2015	Cien Fuego

National team
2015	Dominican Republic
Honours
Pan-American Cup
Gold medal – first place	2022 Hermosillo	Team
Gold medal – first place	2025 Colima	Team
Bolivarian Games
Gold medal – first place	2017 Santa Marta	Team
- Last updated: September 6, 2022

Angélica Maria Hinojosa Diaz (Note: In this Spanish name, the first or paternal surname is Hinojosa and the second or maternal family name is Diaz.) (born 10 January 1997) is a Dominican Republic volleyball player. She is part of the Dominican Republic women's national volleyball team.

She participated in the 2015 FIVB Volleyball World Grand Prix. On club level she played for Cien Fuego in 2015. Hinojosa also competed at the 2017 Bolivarian Games.
