= Celenia Toribio =

Dominican Republic volleyball player (born 1994)

Celenia Toribio De León

Personal information
- Nationality: Dominican
- Born: 17 July 1994 (age 32)
- Height: 181 cm (5 ft 11 in)
- Weight: 69 kg (152 lb)
- Spike: 290 cm (114 in)
- Block: 286 cm (113 in)

Volleyball information
- Position: Setter / Middle Blocker
- Number: 9

Career
Years	Teams
2011	Mirador Santo Domingo

National team
2012-2015	Dominican Republic

Celenia Toribio De León (born 17 July 1994) is a Dominican Republic female volleyball player. With her club Mirador Santo Domingo she competed at the 2011 FIVB Volleyball Women's Club World Championship.
