= Mexico women's national under-23 volleyball team =

Mexico
- Association: Mexican Volleyball Federation
- Confederation: NORCECA

Uniforms
| Home | Away | Third |

FIVB U23 World Championship
- Appearances: 1 (First in 2013)
- Best result: 11th Place : (2013)

Pan American U23 Championship
- Appearances: 2 (First in 2014)
- Best result: 4th Place : (2018).

The Mexico women's national under-23 volleyball team represents Mexico in women's under-23 volleyball events. It is controlled and managed by the Mexican Volleyball Federation, a member of the North American volleyball body North, Central America and Caribbean Volleyball Confederation (NORCECA) and the international volleyball body the Fédération Internationale de Volleyball (FIVB).

== Results ==
=== FIVB U23 World Championship ===
Champions Runners up Third place Fourth place

FIVB U23 World Championship
| Year | Round | Position | Pld | W | L | SW | SL | Squad |
|---|---|---|---|---|---|---|---|---|
| (Mexico) 2013 | | 11th place | | | | | | Squad |
| (Turkey) 2015 | Did not qualify | | | | | | | |
| (Slovenia) 2017 | Did not qualify | | | | | | | |
| Total | 0 Titles | 1/3 | | | | | | |

=== U23 Pan American Cup ===
Champions Runners up Third place Fourth place

U23 Pan American Cup
| Year | Round | Position | Pld | W | L | SW | SL | Squad |
|---|---|---|---|---|---|---|---|---|
| (Peru) 2012 | Did not enter | | | | | | | |
| (Peru) 2014 | | 5th place | | | | | | squad |
| (Peru) 2016 | Did not enter | | | | | | | |
| (Peru) 2018 | | 4th place | | | | | | squad |
| Total | 0 Titles | 2/4 | | | | | | |

== Team ==
=== Current squad ===
The following list of players represented Mexico in the 2018 Women's U23 Pan-American Volleyball Cup:
