= FIVB Volleyball Women's U23 World Championship =

International women's juniors volleyball event

- Sport: Volleyball
- Founded: 2013
- Folded: 2019
- No. of teams: 12
- Continent: International (FIVB)
- Last champion: Turkey (1st title)
- Most titles: Brazil; China; Turkey (1 title each)

The FIVB Volleyball Women's U23 World Championship was the world championship of volleyball for female players under the age of 23 organized by Fédération Internationale de Volleyball (FIVB).

The first edition was staged in 2013 in Mexicali and Tijuana, Mexico and tournaments were played every two years until 2017. The last tournament was hosted by Turkey in Ankara and won by Brazil. FIVB did not announce the 2019 edition of the U23 tournament, later declaring that "As per decision of May 2019 FIVB Board of Administration, the U23 WCH has been abolished."

A corresponding tournament for male players was the FIVB Volleyball Men's U23 World Championship.

== Results summary ==
Year	Host	Final			3rd place match			Teams
Year	Host	Champions	Score	Runners-up	3rd place	Score	4th place	Teams
2013; Details	(Mexico); Mexicali / Tijuana	China	3–0	Dominican Republic	Japan	3–1	United States	12
2015; Details	(Turkey); Ankara	Brazil	3–1	Turkey	Dominican Republic	3–2	Japan	12
2017; Details	(Slovenia); Ljubljana	Turkey	4–0	Slovenia	Bulgaria	4–2	Dominican Republic	12

== Medal table ==
Rank	Nation	Gold	Silver	Bronze	Total
1	Turkey	1	1	0	2
2	Brazil	1	0	0	1
2	China	1	0	0	1
4	Dominican Republic	0	1	1	2
5	Slovenia	0	1	0	1
6	Bulgaria	0	0	1	1
6	Japan	0	0	1	1
Totals (7 entries)		3	3	3	9

== Appearances ==
Team	(Mexico); 2013 (12)	(Turkey); 2015 (12)	(Slovenia); 2017 (12)	Total
Argentina	10th	•	11th	2
Brazil	7th	1st	5th	3
Bulgaria	•	7th	3rd	2
China	1st	5th	7th	3
Colombia	•	9th	•	1
Cuba	9th	11th	6th	3
Dominican Republic	2nd	3rd	4th	3
Egypt	•	11th	9th	2
Germany	8th	•	•	1
Italy	6th	6th	•	2
Japan	3rd	4th	9th	3
Kenya	12th	•	11th	2
Mexico	11th	•	•	1
Peru	•	9th	•	1
Slovenia	•	•	2nd	1
Thailand	•	8th	8th	2
Turkey	5th	2nd	1st	3
United States	4th	•	•	1

Legend

- 1st – Champions
- 2nd – Runners-up
- 3rd – Third place
- 4th – Fourth place
- • – Did not enter / Did not qualify
- – Hosts

== Most valuable player by edition ==
- 2013 – Yao Di (CHN)
- 2015 – Juma Silva (BRA)
- 2017 – Hande Baladın (TUR)

== See also ==
- FIVB Volleyball Men's U23 World Championship
- FIVB Volleyball Women's World Championship
- FIVB Volleyball Women's U20 World Championship
- FIVB Volleyball Girls' U18 World Championship
