= Costa Rica women's national under-23 volleyball team =

Costa Rica
- Association: Costa Rican Volleyball Federation
- Confederation: NORCECA

Uniforms
Home	Away	Third

FIVB U23 World Championship
- Appearances: No appearances

Pan American U23 Championship
- Appearances: 4 (First in 2012)
- Best result: 5th Place : (2016).

The Costa Rica women's national under-23 volleyball team represents Costa Rica in women's under-23 volleyball Events, it is controlled and managed by the Costa Rican Volleyball Federation that is a member of North American volleyball body North, Central America and Caribbean Volleyball Confederation (NORCECA) and the international volleyball body government the Fédération Internationale de Volleyball (FIVB).

== Results ==
=== FIVB U23 World Championship ===
Champions Runners up Third place Fourth place

FIVB U23 World Championship
Year	Round	Position	Pld	W	L	SW	SL	Squad
(Mexico) 2013	Didn't Qualify							
(Turkey) 2015	Didn't Qualify							
(Slovenia) 2017	Didn't Qualify							
Total	0 Titles	0/3						

=== U23 Pan American Cup ===
Champions Runners up Third place Fourth place

U23 Pan American Cup
Year	Round	Position	Pld	W	L	SW	SL	Squad
(Peru) 2012		8th place						squad
(Peru) 2014		7th place						squad
(Peru) 2016		5th place						squad
(Peru) 2018		Qualified						squad
Total	0 Titles	4/4						

== Team ==
=== Current squad ===
The following list of players represent Costa Rica in the 2018 Women's U23 Pan-American Volleyball Cup

Head coach : Sezar Salas Salazar

No.	Name	Date of birth	Height	Weight	Spike	Block	2018 club
3	Saenz	13 December 2000	1.72 m (5 ft 8 in)	65 kg (143 lb)	255 cm (100 in)	250 cm (98 in)	Cartago
5	Espinoza	15 January 2000	1.69 m (5 ft 7 in)	60 kg (130 lb)	000 cm (0 in)	000 cm (0 in)	
7	Campos	13 June 2000	1.62 m (5 ft 4 in)	52 kg (115 lb)	000 cm (0 in)	000 cm (0 in)	
8	Castro	2 August 2001	1.59 m (5 ft 3 in)	63 kg (139 lb)	000 cm (0 in)	000 cm (0 in)	
9	Arroyo	6 September 2001	1.75 m (5 ft 9 in)	68 kg (150 lb)	000 cm (0 in)	000 cm (0 in)	
10	Madriz	8 February 2000	1.77 m (5 ft 10 in)	67 kg (148 lb)	000 cm (0 in)	000 cm (0 in)	
11	Volkova	22 March 2000	1.75 m (5 ft 9 in)	61 kg (134 lb)	000 cm (0 in)	000 cm (0 in)	
12	Monge	15 March 2000	1.69 m (5 ft 7 in)	55 kg (121 lb)	000 cm (0 in)	000 cm (0 in)	
14	Alpizar	27 January 2000	1.75 m (5 ft 9 in)	72 kg (159 lb)	000 cm (0 in)	000 cm (0 in)	
15	Soto	16 May 2000	1.71 m (5 ft 7 in)	65 kg (143 lb)	000 cm (0 in)	000 cm (0 in)	
16	Porras	16 August 1999	1.70 m (5 ft 7 in)	53 kg (117 lb)	000 cm (0 in)	000 cm (0 in)	
19	Beechman	19 June 2000	1.75 m (5 ft 9 in)	65 kg (143 lb)	000 cm (0 in)	000 cm (0 in)	
