= Dominican Republic women's national under-23 volleyball team =

Dominican Republic
- Association: Dominican Volleyball Federation
- Confederation: NORCECA

Uniforms
Home	Away

FIVB U23 World Championship
- Appearances: 3 (First in 2013)
- Best result: (silver) Silver : (2013)

U23 Pan American Cup
- Appearances: 3 (First in 2012)
- Best result: (gold) Gold : (2012, 2014, 2016)
- www.fedovoli.org (in Spanish)

The Dominican Republic women's national under-23 volleyball team represents the Dominican Republic in international women's volleyball competitions and friendly matches under the age 23 and it is ruled by the Dominican Volleyball Federation That Follow the North, Central America and Caribbean Volleyball Confederation NORCECA and also is a part of The Federation of International Volleyball FIVB

== Results ==
=== FIVB U23 World Championship ===
Champions Runners up Third place Fourth place

FIVB U23 World Championship
Year	Round	Position	Pld	W	L	SW	SL	Squad
(Mexico) 2013	Final	2nd place	7	5	2	17	7	Squad
(Turkey) 2015	Semifinal	Third place	7	5	2	16	6	Squad
(Slovenia) 2017	Semifinal	4 place	7	3	4	21	21	Squad
Total	0 Titles	3/3	21	13	8	54	34	—

=== U23 Pan American Cup ===
Champions Runners up Third place Fourth place

U23 Pan American Cup
Year	Round	Position	Pld	W	L	SW	SL	Squad
(Peru) 2012	Final	1st place	5	5	0	15	2	Squad
(Peru) 2014	Final	1st place	6	4	2	14	9	Squad
(Peru) 2016	Final	1st place	7	6	1	19	3	Squad
Total	3 Titles	3/3	18	15	3	48	14	—

== Team ==
=== Current squad ===
The following is the Dominican roster in the 2015 FIVB Volleyball Women's U23 World Championship.

Head Coach: Wagner Pacheco

No.	Name	Date of birth	Height	Weight	Spike	Block	2015 club
1	Jineiry Martínez	3 December 1997	1.90 m (6 ft 3 in)	68 kg (150 lb)	305 cm (120 in)	280 cm (110 in)	(Dominican Republic) Mirador
2	Winifer Fernández	6 January 1995	1.69 m (5 ft 7 in)	62 kg (137 lb)	270 cm (110 in)	265 cm (104 in)	(Dominican Republic) Cien Fuego
3	Gaila González	25 June 1997	1.88 m (6 ft 2 in)	73 kg (161 lb)	304 cm (120 in)	276 cm (109 in)	(Dominican Republic) Mirador
7	María García	4 July 1996	1.84 m (6 ft 0 in)	71 kg (157 lb)	296 cm (117 in)	265 cm (104 in)	(Dominican Republic) Mirador
8	Michelle Polanco	26 February 1998	1.78 m (5 ft 10 in)	66 kg (146 lb)	268 cm (106 in)	239 cm (94 in)	(Dominican Republic) Villa Isabela
9	Angelica Hinojosa	19 January 1997	1.86 m (6 ft 1 in)	72 kg (159 lb)	305 cm (120 in)	279 cm (110 in)	(Dominican Republic) Cien Fuego
10	Pamela Soriano	30 June 1995	1.75 m (5 ft 9 in)	64 kg (141 lb)	290 cm (110 in)	287 cm (113 in)	(Dominican Republic) Mirador
12	Ayleen Rivero	19 May 1997	1.80 m (5 ft 11 in)	67 kg (148 lb)	240 cm (94 in)	231 cm (91 in)	(Dominican Republic) Deportivo Nacional
15	Celenia Toribio	17 July 1994	1.81 m (5 ft 11 in)	69 kg (152 lb)	290 cm (110 in)	286 cm (113 in)	(Dominican Republic) Cien Fuego
16	Yonkaira Peña	10 May 1993	1.90 m (6 ft 3 in)	70 kg (150 lb)	320 cm (130 in)	310 cm (120 in)	(Dominican Republic) Mirador
17	Larysmer Martínez	18 October 1996	1.74 m (5 ft 9 in)	68 kg (150 lb)	288 cm (113 in)	253 cm (100 in)	(Dominican Republic) Deportivo Nacional
20	Brayelin Martínez (C)	11 September 1996	2.01 m (6 ft 7 in)	83 kg (183 lb)	330 cm (130 in)	320 cm (130 in)	(Dominican Republic) Deportivo Nacional
