= Cuba women's national under-23 volleyball team =

Youth volleyball team representing Cuba

Cuba
- Association: Cuban Volleyball Federation
- Confederation: NORCECA

Uniforms
Home	Away	Third

FIVB U23 World Championship
- Appearances: 3 (First in 2013)
- Best result: 6th place : (2017)

U23 Pan American Cup
- Appearances: 3 (First in 2012)
- Best result: (bronze) Bronze : (2014, 2016).

The Cuba women's national under-23 volleyball team represents Cuba in women's under-23 volleyball events, it is controlled and managed by the Cuban Volleyball Federation that is a member of North American volleyball body North, Central America and Caribbean Volleyball Confederation (NORCECA) and the international volleyball body government the Fédération Internationale de Volleyball (FIVB).

== Results ==
=== FIVB U23 World Championship ===
Champions Runners up Third place Fourth place

FIVB U23 World Championship
Year	Round	Position	Pld	W	L	SW	SL	Squad
(Mexico) 2013		9th place						Squad
(Turkey) 2015		11th place						Squad
(Slovenia) 2017		6th place						Squad
Total	0 Titles	3/3						

=== U23 Pan American Cup ===
Champions Runners up Third place Fourth place

U23 Pan American Cup
Year	Round	Position	Pld	W	L	SW	SL	Squad
(Peru) 2012		5th place						Squad
(Peru) 2014	Semifinals	Third place						Squad
(Peru) 2016	Semifinals	Third place						Squad
Total	0 Titles	3/3						

== Team ==
=== Current squad ===
The following is the Cuban roster in the 2017 FIVB Women's U23 World Championship.

Head coach: Wilfredo Robinson

No.	Name	Date of birth	Height	Weight	Spike	Block	2016–2017 club
1	Jessica Aguilera	25 May 1999	1.84 m (6 ft 0 in)	68 kg (150 lb)	311 cm (122 in)	302 cm (119 in)	(Cuba) La Habana
5	Laura Suarez	13 December 1998	1.85 m (6 ft 1 in)	75 kg (165 lb)	304 cm (120 in)	292 cm (115 in)	(Cuba) Pinar del Río
7	Dalila Palma	18 November 1999	1.82 m (6 ft 0 in)	62 kg (137 lb)	301 cm (119 in)	285 cm (112 in)	(Cuba) Cienfuegos
8	Diaris Perez (c)	16 November 1998	1.82 m (6 ft 0 in)	75 kg (165 lb)	304 cm (120 in)	295 cm (116 in)	(Cuba) La Habana
9	Dayessi Ruiz	23 October 1996	1.70 m (5 ft 7 in)	60 kg (130 lb)	288 cm (113 in)	248 cm (98 in)	(Cuba) Camagüey
11	Gretell Moreno	30 January 1998	1.83 m (6 ft 0 in)	68 kg (150 lb)	287 cm (113 in)	280 cm (110 in)	(Cuba) Granma
12	Ailama Cese	29 October 2000	1.88 m (6 ft 2 in)	58 kg (128 lb)	322 cm (127 in)	308 cm (121 in)	(Cuba) Mayabeque
13	Liset Herrera	6 December 1998	1.92 m (6 ft 4 in)	70 kg (150 lb)	311 cm (122 in)	300 cm (120 in)	(Cuba) Matanzas
14	Claudia Hernandez	9 January 1997	1.81 m (5 ft 11 in)	78 kg (172 lb)	225 cm (89 in)	223 cm (88 in)	(Cuba) La Habana
16	Yelennis Diaz	14 October 1995	1.89 m (6 ft 2 in)	71 kg (157 lb)	300 cm (120 in)	298 cm (117 in)	(Cuba) Villa Clara
17	Heidy Casanova	6 November 1998	1.84 m (6 ft 0 in)	78 kg (172 lb)	244 cm (96 in)	240 cm (94 in)	(Cuba) La Habana
20	Yamisleydis Viltres	26 July 2001	1.89 m (6 ft 2 in)	73 kg (161 lb)	247 cm (97 in)	244 cm (96 in)	(Cuba) Granma
