= 2019 FIVB Women's Volleyball Nations League squads =

This article shows the roster of all participating teams at the 2019 FIVB Volleyball Women's Nations League. The 16 national teams involved in the tournament were required to register a squad of 21 players, which every week's 14-player roster must be selected from. Each country must declare its 14-player roster two days before the start of each week's round-robin competition.

== Belgium ==
The following is the Belgian roster in the 2019 FIVB Volleyball Women's Nations League

Head coach: Gert Vande Broek

No.	Name	Date of birth	Height	Weight	Spike	Block	2018–19 club
1	Bieke Kindt	11 February 2000	1.91 m (6 ft 3 in)	74 kg (163 lb)	302 cm (119 in)	284 cm (112 in)	(Belgium) VC Oudegem
2	Elise Van Sas	1 August 1997	1.88 m (6 ft 2 in)	74 kg (163 lb)	296 cm (117 in)	281 cm (111 in)	(Belgium) VC Oudegem
3	Britt Herbots	24 September 1999	1.82 m (6 ft 0 in)	63 kg (139 lb)	310 cm (120 in)	290 cm (110 in)	(Italy) Busto Arsizio
4	Nathalie Lemmens	12 March 1995	1.92 m (6 ft 4 in)	85 kg (187 lb)	311 cm (122 in)	288 cm (113 in)	(Germany) 1. VC Wiesbaden
5	Laura Heyrman	17 May 1993	1.86 m (6 ft 1 in)	74 kg (163 lb)	310 cm (120 in)	280 cm (110 in)	(Japan) Hitachi Rivale
6	Laure Flament	18 June 1998	1.82 m (6 ft 0 in)	76 kg (168 lb)	295 cm (116 in)	282 cm (111 in)	(Belgium) VDK Gent Dames
7	Celine Van Gestel	7 November 1997	1.83 m (6 ft 0 in)	70 kg (150 lb)	310 cm (120 in)	280 cm (110 in)	(Belgium) Asterix AVO
8	Kaja Grobelna	4 January 1995	1.88 m (6 ft 2 in)	72 kg (159 lb)	318 cm (125 in)	299 cm (118 in)	(Italy) Busto Arsizio
9	Freya Aelbrecht	10 February 1990	1.86 m (6 ft 1 in)	82 kg (181 lb)	308 cm (121 in)	282 cm (111 in)	(Japan) Kurobe AquaFairies
10	Dominika Sobolska	3 December 1991	1.87 m (6 ft 2 in)	83 kg (183 lb)	309 cm (122 in)	292 cm (115 in)	(Turkey) Çanakkale
11	Iris Vandewiele	7 March 1994	1.89 m (6 ft 2 in)	71 kg (157 lb)	295 cm (116 in)	286 cm (113 in)	(Belgium) VDK Gent Dames
12	Dominika Strumilo	26 December 1996	1.87 m (6 ft 2 in)	63 kg (139 lb)	311 cm (122 in)	292 cm (115 in)	(Germany) Dresdner SC
13	Marlies Janssens	4 June 1997	1.93 m (6 ft 4 in)	79 kg (174 lb)	312 cm (123 in)	299 cm (118 in)	(Belgium) Asterix AVO
15	Jutta Van De Vyver	11 June 1996	1.75 m (5 ft 9 in)	72 kg (159 lb)	290 cm (110 in)	270 cm (110 in)	(Belgium) VT Optima Lendelede
16	Karolina Goliat	25 October 1996	1.89 m (6 ft 2 in)	79 kg (174 lb)	308 cm (121 in)	295 cm (116 in)	(France) Saint Raphael
17	Ilka Van De Vyver (c)	26 January 1993	1.70 m (5 ft 7 in)	79 kg (174 lb)	296 cm (117 in)	273 cm (107 in)	(Germany) Vilsbiburg
18	Oriane Moulin	18 February 2000	1.81 m (5 ft 11 in)	63 kg (139 lb)	303 cm (119 in)	287 cm (113 in)	(Belgium) Tchalou Volley
19	Silke Van Avermaet	2 June 1999	1.92 m (6 ft 4 in)	76 kg (168 lb)	311 cm (122 in)	290 cm (110 in)	(Belgium) Asterix AVO
20	Jodie Guilliams	26 April 1997	1.80 m (5 ft 11 in)	73 kg (161 lb)	305 cm (120 in)	289 cm (114 in)	(Germany) Ladies in Black Aachen
21	Manon Stragier	12 March 1999	1.82 m (6 ft 0 in)	69 kg (152 lb)	308 cm (121 in)	283 cm (111 in)	(Belgium) VDK Gent Dames
22	Anna Valkenborg	4 January 1998	1.74 m (5 ft 9 in)	59 kg (130 lb)	290 cm (110 in)	270 cm (110 in)	(Belgium) Datovoc Tongeren
24	Felice Vanassche	20 July 2000	1.85 m (6 ft 1 in)	71 kg (157 lb)	300 cm (120 in)	285 cm (112 in)	(Belgium) VC Oudegem
25	Britt Rampelberg	5 June 2000	1.65 m (5 ft 5 in)	58 kg (128 lb)	283 cm (111 in)	269 cm (106 in)	(Belgium) Asterix AVO
27	Charlotte Krenicky	29 June 2000	1.89 m (6 ft 2 in)	80 kg (180 lb)	312 cm (123 in)	282 cm (111 in)	(Belgium) Datovoc Tongeren
29	Britt Ruysschaert	27 May 1994	1.80 m (5 ft 11 in)	60 kg (130 lb)	302 cm (119 in)	281 cm (111 in)	(Belgium) Callant Antwerp

== Brazil ==
The following is the Brazilian roster in the 2019 FIVB Volleyball Women's Nations League

Head coach: José Roberto Guimarães

No.	Name	Date of birth	Height	Weight	Spike	Block	2018–19 club
1	Mara Leão	26 July 1991	1.90 m (6 ft 3 in)	84 kg (185 lb)	320 cm (130 in)	301 cm (119 in)	(Brazil) Minas Tênis Clube
3	Macris Carneiro	3 March 1989	1.78 m (5 ft 10 in)	64 kg (141 lb)	292 cm (115 in)	275 cm (108 in)	(Brazil) Minas Tênis Clube
4	Lara Filomeno	6 August 1989	1.85 m (6 ft 1 in)	69 kg (152 lb)	306 cm (120 in)	290 cm (110 in)	(Brazil) Fluminense
5	Ana Paula Borgo	20 October 1993	1.87 m (6 ft 2 in)	76 kg (168 lb)	305 cm (120 in)	290 cm (110 in)	(Brazil) Praia Clube
6	Júlia Bergmann	21 February 2001	1.91 m (6 ft 3 in)	78 kg (172 lb)	301 cm (119 in)	289 cm (114 in)	(United States) Georgia Tech Yellow Jackets
8	Juma Silva	17 January 1993	1.81 m (5 ft 11 in)	68 kg (150 lb)	295 cm (116 in)	280 cm (110 in)	(Brazil) Hinode Barueri
9	Roberta Ratzke	28 April 1990	1.85 m (6 ft 1 in)	71 kg (157 lb)	287 cm (113 in)	278 cm (109 in)	(Brazil) SESC Rio
10	Gabriela Guimarães	19 May 1994	1.80 m (5 ft 11 in)	65 kg (143 lb)	305 cm (120 in)	289 cm (114 in)	(Brazil) Minas Tênis Clube
11	Tainara Santos	9 March 2000	1.87 m (6 ft 2 in)	81 kg (179 lb)	306 cm (120 in)	289 cm (114 in)	(Brazil) Hinode Barueri
12	Natália Pereira (c)	4 April 1989	1.86 m (6 ft 1 in)	83 kg (183 lb)	311 cm (122 in)	295 cm (116 in)	(Brazil) Minas Tênis Clube
13	Amanda Francisco	16 August 1988	1.80 m (5 ft 11 in)	62 kg (137 lb)	304 cm (120 in)	286 cm (113 in)	(Brazil) Hinode Barueri
14	Fabíola de Sousa	3 February 1983	1.84 m (6 ft 0 in)	70 kg (150 lb)	300 cm (120 in)	285 cm (112 in)	(Brazil) SESI Bauru
15	Ana Carolina da Silva	8 April 1991	1.83 m (6 ft 0 in)	73 kg (161 lb)	290 cm (110 in)	290 cm (110 in)	(Brazil) Praia Clube
16	Tandara Caixeta	30 October 1988	1.84 m (6 ft 0 in)	87 kg (192 lb)	305 cm (120 in)	297 cm (117 in)	(China) Guangdong Evergrande
17	Suelen Pinto	4 October 1987	1.66 m (5 ft 5 in)	81 kg (179 lb)	256 cm (101 in)	238 cm (94 in)	(Brazil) Praia Clube
19	Léia Silva	1 March 1985	1.60 m (5 ft 3 in)	60 kg (130 lb)	275 cm (108 in)	269 cm (106 in)	(Brazil) Minas Tênis Clube
20	Ana Beatriz Corrêa	7 February 1992	1.88 m (6 ft 2 in)	70 kg (150 lb)	298 cm (117 in)	292 cm (115 in)	(Brazil) SESC Rio
21	Maira Claro	7 March 1995	1.86 m (6 ft 1 in)	62 kg (137 lb)	300 cm (120 in)	278 cm (109 in)	(Brazil) Hinode Barueri
22	Lana Conceição	8 December 1996	1.78 m (5 ft 10 in)	74 kg (163 lb)	305 cm (120 in)	288 cm (113 in)	(Brazil) Minas Tênis Clube
23	Edinara Brancher	1 February 1996	1.86 m (6 ft 1 in)	80 kg (180 lb)	295 cm (116 in)	285 cm (112 in)	(Brazil) SESI Bauru
24	Lorenne Teixeira	8 January 1996	1.87 m (6 ft 2 in)	72 kg (159 lb)	306 cm (120 in)	289 cm (114 in)	(Brazil) Osasco Audax
25	Milka Silva	18 July 1994	1.90 m (6 ft 3 in)	75 kg (165 lb)	307 cm (121 in)	291 cm (115 in)	(Brazil) Hinode Barueri
26	Natália Araujo	10 April 1997	1.62 m (5 ft 4 in)	59 kg (130 lb)	228 cm (90 in)	215 cm (85 in)	(Brazil) Hinode Barueri
27	Laís Vasques	12 February 1996	1.71 m (5 ft 7 in)	70 kg (150 lb)	275 cm (108 in)	274 cm (108 in)	(Brazil) Praia Clube
28	Mayany de Souza	24 November 1996	1.85 m (6 ft 1 in)	72 kg (159 lb)	293 cm (115 in)	282 cm (111 in)	(Brazil) Minas Tênis Clube

== Bulgaria ==
The following is the Bulgarian roster in the 2019 FIVB Volleyball Women's Nations League

Head coach: Ivan Petkov

No.	Name	Date of birth	Height	Weight	Spike	Block	2018–19 club
1	Gergana Dimitrova	28 February 1996	1.84 m (6 ft 0 in)	71 kg (157 lb)	305 cm (120 in)	288 cm (113 in)	(France) Volero Le Cannet
2	Nasya Dimitrova	6 November 1992	1.90 m (6 ft 3 in)	70 kg (150 lb)	305 cm (120 in)	290 cm (110 in)	(Bulgaria) Maritza Plovdiv VC
3	Kristiana Petrova	13 July 1997	1.77 m (5 ft 10 in)	70 kg (150 lb)	290 cm (110 in)	282 cm (111 in)	(Bulgaria) Levski Volley
4	Maria Dancheva	4 December 1995	1.95 m (6 ft 5 in)	73 kg (161 lb)	314 cm (124 in)	302 cm (119 in)	(Bulgaria) Maritza Plovdiv VC
5	Simona Dimitrova	17 July 1994	1.85 m (6 ft 1 in)	82 kg (181 lb)	290 cm (110 in)	280 cm (110 in)	(Hungary) TFSE Volley
6	Miroslava Paskova	16 February 1996	1.80 m (5 ft 11 in)	67 kg (148 lb)	299 cm (118 in)	280 cm (110 in)	(Bulgaria) Levski Volley
7	Lora Kitipova (c)	19 May 1991	1.84 m (6 ft 0 in)	66 kg (146 lb)	290 cm (110 in)	283 cm (111 in)	(Bulgaria) Maritza Plovdiv VC
8	Petya Barakova	18 June 1994	1.80 m (5 ft 11 in)	76 kg (168 lb)	283 cm (111 in)	271 cm (107 in)	(Romania) Alba Blaj
9	Monika Krasteva	9 May 1999	1.83 m (6 ft 0 in)	64 kg (141 lb)	292 cm (115 in)	285 cm (112 in)	(Bulgaria) Levski Volley
10	Mira Todorova	12 April 1994	1.87 m (6 ft 2 in)	73 kg (161 lb)	312 cm (123 in)	300 cm (120 in)	(France) Volero Le Cannet
11	Gergana Georgieva	15 October 1998	1.76 m (5 ft 9 in)	61 kg (134 lb)	289 cm (114 in)	272 cm (107 in)	(Bulgaria) Levski Volley
12	Mariya Karakasheva	27 October 1988	1.82 m (6 ft 0 in)	68 kg (150 lb)	295 cm (116 in)	290 cm (110 in)	(Bulgaria) VC CSKA Sofia
13	Mirela Shahpazova	28 October 1997	1.75 m (5 ft 9 in)	65 kg (143 lb)	280 cm (110 in)	270 cm (110 in)	(Bulgaria) Maritza Plovdiv VC
14	Aleksandra Milanova	4 July 2001	1.80 m (5 ft 11 in)	72 kg (159 lb)	295 cm (116 in)	284 cm (112 in)	(Czech Republic) SK Slavia Praha
15	Zhana Todorova	6 January 1997	1.70 m (5 ft 7 in)	56 kg (123 lb)	271 cm (107 in)	255 cm (100 in)	(Bulgaria) Maritza Plovdiv VC
16	Elitsa Vasileva	13 May 1990	1.90 m (6 ft 3 in)	73 kg (161 lb)	302 cm (119 in)	290 cm (110 in)	(Italy) Scandicci
17	Elena Becheva	30 May 1998	1.85 m (6 ft 1 in)	70 kg (150 lb)	296 cm (117 in)	288 cm (113 in)	(Bulgaria) Levski Volley
18	Silvana Chausheva	19 May 1995	1.88 m (6 ft 2 in)	75 kg (165 lb)	305 cm (120 in)	290 cm (110 in)	(Bulgaria) Maritza Plovdiv VC
19	Radostina Marinova	2 October 1998	1.86 m (6 ft 1 in)	65 kg (143 lb)	299 cm (118 in)	288 cm (113 in)	(Bulgaria) Kazanlak Volley
20	Mariya Krivoshiyska	6 September 2001	1.86 m (6 ft 1 in)	58 kg (128 lb)	293 cm (115 in)	285 cm (112 in)	(Bulgaria) Kazanlak Volley
21	Denitsa Dimitrova	26 March 1999	1.89 m (6 ft 2 in)	70 kg (150 lb)	299 cm (118 in)	280 cm (110 in)	(Bulgaria) Levski Volley
22	Dima Usheva	16 December 2000	1.92 m (6 ft 4 in)	73 kg (161 lb)	300 cm (120 in)	280 cm (110 in)	(Bulgaria) Maritza Plovdiv VC
23	Vangeliya Rachkovska	19 July 1997	1.85 m (6 ft 1 in)	67 kg (148 lb)	296 cm (117 in)	281 cm (111 in)	(Bulgaria) Maritza Plovdiv VC
25	Silvia Andreeva	18 August 1995	1.82 m (6 ft 0 in)	63 kg (139 lb)	292 cm (115 in)	284 cm (112 in)	(Bulgaria) Maritza Plovdiv VC
26	Polina Neykova	7 October 1998	1.82 m (6 ft 0 in)	73 kg (161 lb)	287 cm (113 in)	280 cm (110 in)	(Bulgaria) VC CSKA Sofia

== China ==
The following is the Chinese roster in the 2019 FIVB Volleyball Women's Nations League

Head coach: Lang Ping

No.	Name	Date of birth	Height	Weight	Spike	Block	2018–19 club
1	Yuan Xinyue	21 December 1996	2.01 m (6 ft 7 in)	78 kg (172 lb)	317 cm (125 in)	311 cm (122 in)	(China) Bayi Shenzhen
2	Zhu Ting (c)	29 November 1994	1.98 m (6 ft 6 in)	78 kg (172 lb)	327 cm (129 in)	300 cm (120 in)	(Turkey) Vakıfbank Sports Club
3	Diao Linyu	7 April 1994	1.82 m (6 ft 0 in)	69 kg (152 lb)	309 cm (122 in)	303 cm (119 in)	(China) Jiangsu Zenith Steel
4	Yang Hanyu	12 October 1999	1.92 m (6 ft 4 in)	72 kg (159 lb)	317 cm (125 in)	311 cm (122 in)	(China) Shandong Sports Lottery
5	Hu Mingyuan	17 May 1996	1.87 m (6 ft 2 in)	69 kg (152 lb)	305 cm (120 in)	297 cm (117 in)	(China) Liaoning Seagull
6	Gong Xiangyu	21 April 1997	1.86 m (6 ft 1 in)	72 kg (159 lb)	313 cm (123 in)	302 cm (119 in)	(China) Jiangsu Zenith Steel
7	Wang Yuanyuan	14 July 1997	1.97 m (6 ft 6 in)	75 kg (165 lb)	312 cm (123 in)	300 cm (120 in)	(China) Tianjin Bohai Bank
8	Zeng Chunlei	3 November 1989	1.87 m (6 ft 2 in)	67 kg (148 lb)	315 cm (124 in)	315 cm (124 in)	(China) Beijing Baic Auto
9	Zhang Changning	6 November 1995	1.95 m (6 ft 5 in)	80 kg (180 lb)	315 cm (124 in)	303 cm (119 in)	(China) Jiangsu Zenith Steel
10	Liu Xiaotong	16 February 1990	1.88 m (6 ft 2 in)	65 kg (143 lb)	312 cm (123 in)	300 cm (120 in)	(China) Beijing Baic Auto
11	Yao Di	15 August 1992	1.82 m (6 ft 0 in)	83 kg (183 lb)	306 cm (120 in)	298 cm (117 in)	(China) Tianjin Bohai Bank
12	Li Yingying	19 February 2000	1.96 m (6 ft 5 in)	71 kg (157 lb)	302 cm (119 in)	294 cm (116 in)	(China) Tianjin Bohai Bank
13	Sun Yan	6 July 2001	1.88 m (6 ft 2 in)	68 kg (150 lb)	308 cm (121 in)	295 cm (116 in)	(China) Jiangsu Zenith Steel
14	Zheng Yixin	6 May 1995	1.87 m (6 ft 2 in)	71 kg (157 lb)	316 cm (124 in)	307 cm (121 in)	(China) Fujian Xi Meng Bao
15	Lin Li	5 July 1992	1.71 m (5 ft 7 in)	65 kg (143 lb)	294 cm (116 in)	294 cm (116 in)	(China) Fujian Xi Meng Bao
16	Ding Xia	13 January 1990	1.80 m (5 ft 11 in)	67 kg (148 lb)	305 cm (120 in)	300 cm (120 in)	(China) Liaoning Seagull
17	Yan Ni	2 March 1987	1.92 m (6 ft 4 in)	74 kg (163 lb)	317 cm (125 in)	306 cm (120 in)	(China) Liaoning Seagull
18	Wang Mengjie	14 November 1995	1.72 m (5 ft 8 in)	65 kg (143 lb)	289 cm (114 in)	280 cm (110 in)	(China) Shandong Sports Lottery
19	Liu Yanhan	19 January 1993	1.90 m (6 ft 3 in)	75 kg (165 lb)	315 cm (124 in)	305 cm (120 in)	(China) Bayi Shenzhen
20	Duan Fang	26 December 1994	1.86 m (6 ft 1 in)	73 kg (161 lb)	301 cm (119 in)	296 cm (117 in)	(China) Liaoning Seagull
21	Ni Feifan	14 February 2001	1.75 m (5 ft 9 in)	67 kg (148 lb)	281 cm (111 in)	275 cm (108 in)	(China) Jiangsu Zenith Steel
23	Du Qingqing	18 December 1996	1.92 m (6 ft 4 in)	72 kg (159 lb)	312 cm (123 in)	300 cm (120 in)	(China) Shandong Sports Lottery
25	Zhang Yichan	11 February 1991	1.87 m (6 ft 2 in)	76 kg (168 lb)	318 cm (125 in)	307 cm (121 in)	(China) Shanghai
26	Jin Ye	10 March 1996	1.87 m (6 ft 2 in)	77 kg (170 lb)	310 cm (120 in)	302 cm (119 in)	(China) Beijing Baic Auto
29	Che Wenhan	11 April 2000	1.93 m (6 ft 4 in)	67 kg (148 lb)	305 cm (120 in)	297 cm (117 in)	(China) Shandong Sports Lottery

== Dominican Republic ==
The following is the Dominican roster in the 2019 FIVB Volleyball Women's Nations League

Head coach: Marcos Kwiek

No.	Name	Date of birth	Height	Weight	Spike	Block	2018–19 club
1	Annerys Vargas	7 August 1981	1.96 m (6 ft 5 in)	70 kg (150 lb)	327 cm (129 in)	320 cm (130 in)	Free agent
2	Yaneirys Rodriguez	26 June 2000	1.71 m (5 ft 7 in)	56 kg (123 lb)	280 cm (110 in)	251 cm (99 in)	(Dominican Republic) Bonao
3	Lisvel Elisa Eve	10 September 1991	1.94 m (6 ft 4 in)	70 kg (150 lb)	325 cm (128 in)	315 cm (124 in)	(Dominican Republic) Puerto Plata
4	Vielka Peralta	13 April 1999	1.86 m (6 ft 1 in)	56 kg (123 lb)	310 cm (120 in)	305 cm (120 in)	(Dominican Republic) Deportivo Nacional
5	Brenda Castillo	5 June 1992	1.67 m (5 ft 6 in)	55 kg (121 lb)	245 cm (96 in)	230 cm (91 in)	(Dominican Republic) San Cristóbal
6	Camil Domínguez	7 December 1991	1.76 m (5 ft 9 in)	75 kg (165 lb)	232 cm (91 in)	275 cm (108 in)	(Dominican Republic) Mirador
7	Niverka Marte	19 October 1990	1.78 m (5 ft 10 in)	71 kg (157 lb)	295 cm (116 in)	283 cm (111 in)	(Dominican Republic) Deportivo Nacional
8	Cándida Arias	11 March 1992	1.94 m (6 ft 4 in)	68 kg (150 lb)	320 cm (130 in)	315 cm (124 in)	(Dominican Republic) San Cristóbal
9	Angelica Hinojosa	10 January 1997	1.86 m (6 ft 1 in)	72 kg (159 lb)	305 cm (120 in)	279 cm (110 in)	(Dominican Republic) Cienfuegos
10	Natalia Martínez	25 November 2000	1.86 m (6 ft 1 in)	71 kg (157 lb)	310 cm (120 in)	300 cm (120 in)	(Dominican Republic) Mirador
11	Marifranchi Rodriguez	29 August 1990	1.84 m (6 ft 0 in)	68 kg (150 lb)	310 cm (120 in)	300 cm (120 in)	(Dominican Republic) Mirador
12	Yokaty Pérez	6 August 1998	1.78 m (5 ft 10 in)	79 kg (174 lb)	291 cm (115 in)	257 cm (101 in)	(Dominican Republic) Los Cachorros
13	Hennesys Lalane	10 April 2000	1.85 m (6 ft 1 in)	74 kg (163 lb)	275 cm (108 in)	263 cm (104 in)	(Dominican Republic) Deportivo Nacional
14	Prisilla Rivera	29 December 1984	1.83 m (6 ft 0 in)	67 kg (148 lb)	309 cm (122 in)	305 cm (120 in)	(Dominican Republic) San Pedro de Macorís
15	Madeline Guillen	4 June 2001	1.86 m (6 ft 1 in)	74 kg (163 lb)	273 cm (107 in)	242 cm (95 in)	(Dominican Republic) Malanga
16	Yonkaira Peña	10 May 1993	1.90 m (6 ft 3 in)	70 kg (150 lb)	320 cm (130 in)	310 cm (120 in)	(Brazil) Rio de Janeiro
17	Gina Mambrú	21 January 1986	1.82 m (6 ft 0 in)	65 kg (143 lb)	330 cm (130 in)	315 cm (124 in)	(Dominican Republic) Los Cachorros
18	Bethania de la Cruz	13 May 1987	1.88 m (6 ft 2 in)	70 kg (150 lb)	330 cm (130 in)	320 cm (130 in)	(Italy) Scandicci
19	Ana Binet	9 February 1992	1.74 m (5 ft 9 in)	58 kg (128 lb)	280 cm (110 in)	260 cm (100 in)	(Dominican Republic) Samaná
20	Brayelin Martínez	11 September 1996	2.01 m (6 ft 7 in)	83 kg (183 lb)	330 cm (130 in)	320 cm (130 in)	(Italy) Casalmaggiore
21	Jineiry Martínez	3 December 1997	1.90 m (6 ft 3 in)	68 kg (150 lb)	305 cm (120 in)	280 cm (110 in)	(Dominican Republic) Mirador
22	Erasma Moreno	25 November 1991	1.83 m (6 ft 0 in)	75 kg (165 lb)	304 cm (120 in)	289 cm (114 in)	(Dominican Republic) Monte Plata
23	Gaila González	25 June 1997	1.88 m (6 ft 2 in)	73 kg (161 lb)	304 cm (120 in)	276 cm (109 in)	(Dominican Republic) Mirador
24	Marianne Fersola	16 January 1992	1.91 m (6 ft 3 in)	60 kg (130 lb)	315 cm (124 in)	310 cm (120 in)	(Dominican Republic) Mirador
25	Larysmer Caro	18 October 1996	1.74 m (5 ft 9 in)	68 kg (150 lb)	288 cm (113 in)	258 cm (102 in)	(Dominican Republic) Deportivo Nacional

== Germany ==
The following is the German roster in the 2019 FIVB Volleyball Women's Nations League

Head coach: Felix Koslowski

No.	Name	Date of birth	Height	Weight	Spike	Block	2018–19 club
1	Lenka Dürr	10 December 1990	1.71 m (5 ft 7 in)	59 kg (130 lb)	280 cm (110 in)	270 cm (110 in)	(Romania) Dresdner SC
2	Pia Kästner	29 June 1998	1.82 m (6 ft 0 in)	68 kg (150 lb)	297 cm (117 in)	286 cm (113 in)	(Germany) Stuttgart
3	Denise Hanke	31 August 1989	1.79 m (5 ft 10 in)	58 kg (128 lb)	284 cm (112 in)	272 cm (107 in)	(Germany) Schweriner
4	Selma Hetmann	27 October 1995	1.88 m (6 ft 2 in)	70 kg (150 lb)	325 cm (128 in)	315 cm (124 in)	(Germany) Wiesbaden
5	Jana Franziska Poll	7 May 1988	1.85 m (6 ft 1 in)	69 kg (152 lb)	310 cm (120 in)	290 cm (110 in)	(Germany) Stuttgart
6	Jennifer Geerties	5 April 1994	1.84 m (6 ft 0 in)	58 kg (128 lb)	298 cm (117 in)	288 cm (113 in)	(Germany) Schweriner
7	Nele Barber	27 October 1994	1.83 m (6 ft 0 in)	55 kg (121 lb)	290 cm (110 in)	280 cm (110 in)	(Germany) Schweriner
8	Kimberly Drewniok	11 August 1997	1.88 m (6 ft 2 in)	73 kg (161 lb)	311 cm (122 in)	298 cm (117 in)	(Germany) Wiesbaden
9	Lina Alsmeier	29 June 2000	1.89 m (6 ft 2 in)	70 kg (150 lb)	305 cm (120 in)	290 cm (110 in)	(Germany) Münster
10	Lena Stigrot	20 December 1994	1.84 m (6 ft 0 in)	68 kg (150 lb)	303 cm (119 in)	295 cm (116 in)	(Germany) Vilsbiburg
11	Louisa Lippmann	23 September 1994	1.91 m (6 ft 3 in)	78 kg (172 lb)	319 cm (126 in)	312 cm (123 in)	(Germany) Schweriner
12	Hanna Orthmann	3 October 1998	1.88 m (6 ft 2 in)	74 kg (163 lb)	302 cm (119 in)	291 cm (115 in)	(Italy) Monza
13	Denise Imoudu	14 December 1995	1.80 m (5 ft 11 in)	67 kg (148 lb)	290 cm (110 in)	280 cm (110 in)	(Germany) Potsdam
14	Marie Schölzel	1 August 1997	1.88 m (6 ft 2 in)	66 kg (146 lb)	307 cm (121 in)	299 cm (118 in)	(Germany) Schweriner
15	Corina Glaab	25 May 2000	1.80 m (5 ft 11 in)	65 kg (143 lb)	291 cm (115 in)	281 cm (111 in)	(Germany) Vilsbiburg
16	Linda Bock	27 May 2000	1.72 m (5 ft 8 in)	60 kg (130 lb)	278 cm (109 in)	270 cm (110 in)	(Germany) Münster
17	Anna Pogany	21 July 1994	1.70 m (5 ft 7 in)	60 kg (130 lb)	280 cm (110 in)	270 cm (110 in)	(Switzerland) Aesch Pfeffingen
18	Leonie Schwertmann	12 January 1994	1.90 m (6 ft 3 in)	80 kg (180 lb)	300 cm (120 in)	290 cm (110 in)	(Germany) Vilsbiburg
19	Luisa Keller	25 August 2001	1.84 m (6 ft 0 in)	65 kg (143 lb)	301 cm (119 in)	285 cm (112 in)	(Germany) Münster
20	Celin Stöhr	22 November 1993	1.93 m (6 ft 4 in)	68 kg (150 lb)	299 cm (118 in)	290 cm (110 in)	(Germany) Vilsbiburg
21	Camilla Weitzel	11 June 2000	1.95 m (6 ft 5 in)	75 kg (165 lb)	302 cm (119 in)	296 cm (117 in)	(Romania) Dresdner SC
22	Lisa Gründing	2 December 1991	1.86 m (6 ft 1 in)	68 kg (150 lb)	303 cm (119 in)	291 cm (115 in)	(Germany) Potsdam
23	Natalie Wilczek	9 March 2000	1.87 m (6 ft 2 in)	73 kg (161 lb)	322 cm (127 in)	312 cm (123 in)	(Germany) Potsdam
26	Lea Ambrosius	22 May 2000	1.89 m (6 ft 2 in)	79 kg (174 lb)	305 cm (120 in)	298 cm (117 in)	(Germany) Schweriner
27	Elisa Lohmann	22 July 1998	1.74 m (5 ft 9 in)	60 kg (130 lb)	290 cm (110 in)	278 cm (109 in)	(Germany) Schweriner

== Italy ==
The following is the Italian roster in the 2019 FIVB Volleyball Women's Nations League

Head coach: Davide Mazzanti

No.	Name	Date of birth	Height	Weight	Spike	Block	2018–19 club
1	Indre Sorokaite	2 July 1988	1.88 m (6 ft 2 in)	80 kg (180 lb)	303 cm (119 in)	280 cm (110 in)	(Italy) Il Bisonte Firenze
2	Sara Alberti	3 January 1993	1.85 m (6 ft 1 in)	72 kg (159 lb)	310 cm (120 in)	300 cm (120 in)	(Italy) Il Bisonte Firenze
3	Carlotta Cambi	28 May 1996	1.77 m (5 ft 10 in)	66 kg (146 lb)	302 cm (119 in)	292 cm (115 in)	(Italy) Foppapedretti Bergamo
4	Francesca Bosio	7 August 1997	1.80 m (5 ft 11 in)	69 kg (152 lb)	294 cm (116 in)	284 cm (112 in)	(Italy) Cuneo Granda Volley
5	Ofelia Malinov	29 February 1996	1.88 m (6 ft 2 in)	81 kg (179 lb)	318 cm (125 in)	307 cm (121 in)	(Italy) Scandicci
6	Monica De Gennaro	8 January 1987	1.74 m (5 ft 9 in)	67 kg (148 lb)	292 cm (115 in)	217 cm (85 in)	(Italy) Imoco Conegliano
7	Raphaela Folie	7 March 1991	1.87 m (6 ft 2 in)	73 kg (161 lb)	324 cm (128 in)	300 cm (120 in)	(Italy) Imoco Conegliano
8	Alessia Orro	18 July 1998	1.80 m (5 ft 11 in)	74 kg (163 lb)	308 cm (121 in)	231 cm (91 in)	(Italy) Busto Arsizio
9	Caterina Bosetti	2 February 1994	1.79 m (5 ft 10 in)	59 kg (130 lb)	299 cm (118 in)	281 cm (111 in)	(Italy) Pomì Casalmaggiore
10	Cristina Chirichella (c)	10 February 1994	1.95 m (6 ft 5 in)	79 kg (174 lb)	322 cm (127 in)	306 cm (120 in)	(Italy) Igor Gorgonzola Novara
11	Anna Danesi	20 April 1996	1.98 m (6 ft 6 in)	78 kg (172 lb)	312 cm (123 in)	294 cm (116 in)	(Italy) Imoco Conegliano
12	Anastasia Guerra	15 October 1996	1.87 m (6 ft 2 in)	69 kg (152 lb)	312 cm (123 in)	294 cm (116 in)	(France) ASPTT Mulhouse
13	Sarah Fahr	12 September 2001	1.94 m (6 ft 4 in)	84 kg (185 lb)	322 cm (127 in)	306 cm (120 in)	(Italy) Club Italia
14	Elena Pietrini	17 March 2000	1.90 m (6 ft 3 in)	73 kg (161 lb)	330 cm (130 in)	306 cm (120 in)	(Italy) Club Italia
15	Sylvia Nwakalor	12 August 1999	1.80 m (5 ft 11 in)	70 kg (150 lb)	330 cm (130 in)	312 cm (123 in)	(Italy) Club Italia
16	Lucia Bosetti	9 July 1989	1.78 m (5 ft 10 in)	63 kg (139 lb)	310 cm (120 in)	292 cm (115 in)	(Italy) Scandicci
17	Miriam Sylla	8 January 1995	1.84 m (6 ft 0 in)	80 kg (180 lb)	320 cm (130 in)	240 cm (94 in)	(Italy) Imoco Conegliano
18	Paola Egonu	18 December 1998	1.93 m (6 ft 4 in)	80 kg (180 lb)	344 cm (135 in)	321 cm (126 in)	(Italy) Igor Gorgonzola Novara
19	Alexandra Botezat	3 August 1998	1.97 m (6 ft 6 in)	75 kg (165 lb)	316 cm (124 in)	304 cm (120 in)	(Italy) Busto Arsizio
20	Beatrice Parrocchiale	26 December 1995	1.68 m (5 ft 6 in)	59 kg (130 lb)	286 cm (113 in)	258 cm (102 in)	(Italy) Il Bisonte Firenze
21	Chiara De Bortoli	28 July 1997	1.77 m (5 ft 10 in)	61 kg (134 lb)	308 cm (121 in)	286 cm (113 in)	(Italy) Club Italia
22	Anna Nicoletti	3 January 1996	1.93 m (6 ft 4 in)	86 kg (190 lb)	306 cm (120 in)	290 cm (110 in)	(Italy) Millenium Brescia
23	Francesca Villani	30 May 1996	1.86 m (6 ft 1 in)	85 kg (187 lb)	305 cm (120 in)	280 cm (110 in)	(Italy) Millenium Brescia
26	Elena Perinelli	27 June 1995	1.82 m (6 ft 0 in)	66 kg (146 lb)	299 cm (118 in)	277 cm (109 in)	(Italy) Chieri '76 Volleyball
29	Beatrice Berti	12 January 1996	1.93 m (6 ft 4 in)	87 kg (192 lb)	304 cm (120 in)	288 cm (113 in)	(Italy) Busto Arsizio

== Japan ==
The following is the Japanese roster in the 2019 FIVB Volleyball Women's Nations League

Head coach: Kumi Nakada

No.	Name	Date of birth	Height	Weight	Spike	Block	2018–19 club
2	Sarina Koga	21 May 1996	1.80 m (5 ft 11 in)	67 kg (148 lb)	302 cm (119 in)	290 cm (110 in)	(Japan) NEC Red Rockets
3	Nana Iwasaka (c)	3 July 1990	1.87 m (6 ft 2 in)	75 kg (165 lb)	297 cm (117 in)	293 cm (115 in)	(Japan) Hisamitsu Springs
4	Risa Shinnabe	11 July 1990	1.73 m (5 ft 8 in)	64 kg (141 lb)	292 cm (115 in)	285 cm (112 in)	(Japan) Hisamitsu Springs
5	Erika Araki	3 August 1984	1.86 m (6 ft 1 in)	81 kg (179 lb)	302 cm (119 in)	297 cm (117 in)	(Japan) Toyota Auto Body Queenseis
6	Haruka Miyashita	1 September 1994	1.77 m (5 ft 10 in)	61 kg (134 lb)	291 cm (115 in)	272 cm (107 in)	(Japan) Okayama Seagulls
7	Yuki Ishii	8 May 1991	1.80 m (5 ft 11 in)	68 kg (150 lb)	305 cm (120 in)	287 cm (113 in)	(Japan) Hisamitsu Springs
8	Mami Uchiseto	25 October 1991	1.70 m (5 ft 7 in)	74 kg (163 lb)	295 cm (116 in)	285 cm (112 in)	(Japan) Toyota Auto Body Queenseis
9	Haruyo Shimamura	4 March 1992	1.82 m (6 ft 0 in)	78 kg (172 lb)	297 cm (117 in)	290 cm (110 in)	(Japan) NEC Red Rockets
10	Koyomi Tominaga	1 May 1989	1.75 m (5 ft 9 in)	68 kg (150 lb)	295 cm (116 in)	280 cm (110 in)	(Japan) Ageo Medics
11	Yurie Nabeya	15 December 1993	1.76 m (5 ft 9 in)	55 kg (121 lb)	305 cm (120 in)	292 cm (115 in)	(Japan) Denso Airybees
12	Miya Sato	7 March 1990	1.75 m (5 ft 9 in)	62 kg (137 lb)	278 cm (109 in)	275 cm (108 in)	(Japan) Hitachi Rivale
13	Mai Okumura	31 October 1990	1.77 m (5 ft 10 in)	69 kg (152 lb)	295 cm (116 in)	285 cm (112 in)	(Thailand) Nakhon Ratchasima
14	Mako Kobata	15 August 1992	1.64 m (5 ft 5 in)	56 kg (123 lb)	285 cm (112 in)	274 cm (108 in)	(Japan) JT Marvelous
15	Kotoe Inoue	15 February 1990	1.62 m (5 ft 4 in)	55 kg (121 lb)	286 cm (113 in)	275 cm (108 in)	(Romania) CSM București
16	Ai Kurogo	14 June 1998	1.80 m (5 ft 11 in)	69 kg (152 lb)	306 cm (120 in)	295 cm (116 in)	(Japan) Toray Arrows
17	Kanami Tashiro	25 March 1991	1.73 m (5 ft 8 in)	66 kg (146 lb)	284 cm (112 in)	273 cm (107 in)	(Romania) CSM București
18	Akane Moriya	8 January 1991	1.65 m (5 ft 5 in)	55 kg (121 lb)	280 cm (110 in)	260 cm (100 in)	(Japan) Ageo Medics
19	Yūka Imamura	2 September 1993	1.76 m (5 ft 9 in)	69 kg (152 lb)	295 cm (116 in)	291 cm (115 in)	(Japan) Hisamitsu Springs
20	Aya Watanabe	23 April 1991	1.76 m (5 ft 9 in)	68 kg (150 lb)	301 cm (119 in)	0 cm (0 in)	(Japan) Toyota Auto Body Queenseis
21	Miwako Osanai	19 July 1997	1.75 m (5 ft 9 in)	67 kg (148 lb)	293 cm (115 in)	270 cm (110 in)	(Japan) Hitachi Rivale
22	Yuri Yoshino	16 December 1999	1.73 m (5 ft 8 in)	67 kg (148 lb)	290 cm (110 in)	280 cm (110 in)	(Japan) Ageo Medics
23	Mai Irisawa	2 June 1999	1.88 m (6 ft 2 in)	72 kg (159 lb)	309 cm (122 in)	293 cm (115 in)	(Japan) Hitachi Rivale
24	Aika Akutagawa	3 April 1991	1.80 m (5 ft 11 in)	62 kg (137 lb)	300 cm (120 in)	280 cm (110 in)	(Japan) JT Marvelous
25	Nanami Seki	12 June 1999	1.70 m (5 ft 7 in)	58 kg (128 lb)	282 cm (111 in)	0 cm (0 in)	(Japan) Toray Arrows
27	Miyu Nakagawa	8 January 2000	1.80 m (5 ft 11 in)	65 kg (143 lb)	307 cm (121 in)	300 cm (120 in)	(Japan) Hisamitsu Springs

== Netherlands ==
The following is the Dutch roster in the 2019 FIVB Volleyball Women's Nations League

Head coach: Jamie Morrison

No.	Name	Date of birth	Height	Weight	Spike	Block	2018–19 club
1	Kirsten Knip	14 September 1992	1.75 m (5 ft 9 in)	70 kg (150 lb)	281 cm (111 in)	275 cm (108 in)	(Germany) Ladies in Black Aachen
2	Femke Stoltenborg	30 July 1991	1.89 m (6 ft 2 in)	81 kg (179 lb)	303 cm (119 in)	299 cm (118 in)	(Poland) Budowlani Łódź
3	Yvon Beliën	28 December 1993	1.88 m (6 ft 2 in)	73 kg (161 lb)	307 cm (121 in)	303 cm (119 in)	(Turkey) Beşiktaş
4	Celeste Plak	26 October 1995	1.90 m (6 ft 3 in)	87 kg (192 lb)	314 cm (124 in)	302 cm (119 in)	(Italy) Igor Gorgonzola Novara
5	Robin de Kruijf	5 May 1991	1.92 m (6 ft 4 in)	81 kg (179 lb)	313 cm (123 in)	300 cm (120 in)	(Italy) Imoco Conegliano
6	Maret Balkestein-Grothues	16 September 1988	1.80 m (5 ft 11 in)	68 kg (150 lb)	304 cm (120 in)	285 cm (112 in)	(Romania) CSM București
7	Juliët Lohuis	10 September 1996	1.90 m (6 ft 3 in)	77 kg (170 lb)	305 cm (120 in)	295 cm (116 in)	(Germany) USC Münster
8	Demi Korevaar	9 August 2000	1.87 m (6 ft 2 in)	71 kg (157 lb)	311 cm (122 in)	303 cm (119 in)	(Netherlands) Sliedrecht
9	Myrthe Schoot	29 August 1988	1.82 m (6 ft 0 in)	70 kg (150 lb)	298 cm (117 in)	286 cm (113 in)	(Germany) Rote Raben Vilsbiburg
10	Lonneke Slöetjes	15 November 1990	1.91 m (6 ft 3 in)	76 kg (168 lb)	322 cm (127 in)	315 cm (124 in)	(Turkey) VakıfBank
11	Anne Buijs	2 December 1991	1.91 m (6 ft 3 in)	73 kg (161 lb)	317 cm (125 in)	299 cm (118 in)	(Italy) Saugella Monza
12	Britt Bongaerts	3 November 1996	1.85 m (6 ft 1 in)	68 kg (150 lb)	296 cm (117 in)	284 cm (112 in)	(Germany) Schweriner SC
13	Hester Jasper	7 May 2001	1.75 m (5 ft 9 in)	63 kg (139 lb)	295 cm (116 in)	287 cm (113 in)	(Netherlands) VC Sneek
14	Laura Dijkema (c)	18 February 1990	1.84 m (6 ft 0 in)	70 kg (150 lb)	293 cm (115 in)	269 cm (106 in)	(Italy) II Bisonte Firenze
16	Indy Baijens	4 February 2001	1.90 m (6 ft 3 in)	67 kg (148 lb)	317 cm (125 in)	312 cm (123 in)	(Netherlands) Talent Team Papendal
17	Nicole Oude Luttikhuis	26 December 1997	1.91 m (6 ft 3 in)	82 kg (181 lb)	312 cm (123 in)	305 cm (120 in)	(Germany) Ladies in Black Aachen
18	Marrit Jasper	28 February 1996	1.80 m (5 ft 11 in)	75 kg (165 lb)	300 cm (120 in)	285 cm (112 in)	(Germany) Ladies in Black Aachen
19	Nika Daalderop	29 November 1998	1.89 m (6 ft 2 in)	72 kg (159 lb)	317 cm (125 in)	308 cm (121 in)	(Italy) II Bisonte Firenze
20	Tessa Polder	3 August 1998	1.89 m (6 ft 2 in)	76 kg (168 lb)	301 cm (119 in)	293 cm (115 in)	(Germany) Schweriner SC
21	Annick Meijers	23 March 2000	1.88 m (6 ft 2 in)	70 kg (150 lb)	310 cm (120 in)	301 cm (119 in)	(Netherlands) Talent Team Papendal
22	Nicole Koolhaas	31 January 1991	1.98 m (6 ft 6 in)	77 kg (170 lb)	310 cm (120 in)	300 cm (120 in)	(Romania) CSM București
24	Florien Reesink	9 June 1998	1.74 m (5 ft 9 in)	61 kg (134 lb)	279 cm (110 in)	273 cm (107 in)	(Netherlands) Sliedrecht
26	Sarah Van Aalen	21 January 2000	1.83 m (6 ft 0 in)	68 kg (150 lb)	300 cm (120 in)	293 cm (115 in)	(Netherlands) Sliedrecht
30	Anniek Siebring	13 May 1997	1.80 m (5 ft 11 in)	68 kg (150 lb)	302 cm (119 in)	287 cm (113 in)	(Germany) VfB 91 Suhl
31	Eline Timmerman	30 December 1998	1.92 m (6 ft 4 in)	78 kg (172 lb)	303 cm (119 in)	295 cm (116 in)	(Netherlands) Eurosped TVT

== Poland ==
The following is the German roster in the 2019 FIVB Volleyball Women's Nations League

Head coach: Jacek Nawrocki

No.	Name	Date of birth	Height	Weight	Spike	Block	2018–19 club
1	Julia Nowicka	21 October 1998	1.74 m (5 ft 9 in)	58 kg (128 lb)	295 cm (116 in)	278 cm (109 in)	(Poland) Bielsko-Biała
2	Marta Wojcik	17 February 1982	1.83 m (6 ft 0 in)	70 kg (150 lb)	295 cm (116 in)	280 cm (110 in)	(Poland) Budowlani Łódź
3	Klaudia Alagierska	2 January 1996	1.90 m (6 ft 3 in)	76 kg (168 lb)	297 cm (117 in)	290 cm (110 in)	(Poland) Legionovia Legionowo
4	Kamila Witkowska	2 December 1991	1.91 m (6 ft 3 in)	76 kg (168 lb)	310 cm (120 in)	301 cm (119 in)	(Poland) KS Developres Rzeszów
5	Agnieszka Kąkolewska (c)	17 October 1994	1.97 m (6 ft 6 in)	75 kg (165 lb)	309 cm (122 in)	295 cm (116 in)	(Poland) Budowlani Łódź
6	Justyna Łukasik	27 January 1993	1.87 m (6 ft 2 in)	77 kg (170 lb)	301 cm (119 in)	285 cm (112 in)	(Poland) Kraków
7	Julia Twardowska	4 May 1995	1.85 m (6 ft 1 in)	66 kg (146 lb)	297 cm (117 in)	283 cm (111 in)	(Poland) Budowlani Łódź
8	Maria Stenzel	25 November 1998	1.68 m (5 ft 6 in)	53 kg (117 lb)	278 cm (109 in)	262 cm (103 in)	(Poland) Wrocław
9	Magdalena Stysiak	3 December 2000	1.98 m (6 ft 6 in)	85 kg (187 lb)	312 cm (123 in)	295 cm (116 in)	(Poland) Budowlani Łódź
10	Zuzanna Efimienko	8 August 1989	1.97 m (6 ft 6 in)	72 kg (159 lb)	318 cm (125 in)	303 cm (119 in)	(Poland) ŁKS Łódź
11	Monika Bociek	6 April 1996	1.85 m (6 ft 1 in)	70 kg (150 lb)	302 cm (119 in)	287 cm (113 in)	(Poland) Muszyna
12	Malgorzata Jasek	14 March 1995	1.91 m (6 ft 3 in)	78 kg (172 lb)	300 cm (120 in)	240 cm (94 in)	(Poland) Legionovia Legionowo
13	Paulina Maj-Erwardt	22 March 1987	1.66 m (5 ft 5 in)	58 kg (128 lb)	277 cm (109 in)	255 cm (100 in)	(Poland) Bielsko-Biała
14	Joanna Wolosz	7 April 1990	1.81 m (5 ft 11 in)	71 kg (157 lb)	303 cm (119 in)	281 cm (111 in)	(Italy) Imoco Volley
15	Martyna Grajber	28 March 1995	1.80 m (5 ft 11 in)	67 kg (148 lb)	293 cm (115 in)	276 cm (109 in)	(Poland) Budowlani Łódź
16	Natalia Mędrzyk	13 January 1992	1.83 m (6 ft 0 in)	73 kg (161 lb)	305 cm (120 in)	287 cm (113 in)	(Poland) Police
17	Malwina Smarzek	3 June 1996	1.91 m (6 ft 3 in)	80 kg (180 lb)	318 cm (125 in)	292 cm (115 in)	(Poland) Police
18	Emilia Mucha	7 December 1993	1.86 m (6 ft 1 in)	78 kg (172 lb)	300 cm (120 in)	283 cm (111 in)	(Poland) Bielsko-Biała
19	Olivia Różański	5 June 1997	1.85 m (6 ft 1 in)	74 kg (163 lb)	315 cm (124 in)	300 cm (120 in)	(Poland) Bielsko-Biała
20	Marlena Pleśnierowicz	9 January 1992	1.76 m (5 ft 9 in)	61 kg (134 lb)	295 cm (116 in)	281 cm (111 in)	(Poland) Bielsko-Biała
21	Weronika Centka	6 September 2000	1.91 m (6 ft 3 in)	63 kg (139 lb)	312 cm (123 in)	297 cm (117 in)	(Poland) Budowlani Łódź
22	Natalia Murek	8 September 1999	1.80 m (5 ft 11 in)	70 kg (150 lb)	302 cm (119 in)	283 cm (111 in)	(Poland) Wrocław
23	Zuzanna Gorecka	10 April 2000	1.81 m (5 ft 11 in)	63 kg (139 lb)	301 cm (119 in)	284 cm (112 in)	(Poland) Legionovia Legionowo
24	Monika Jagła	4 January 2000	1.77 m (5 ft 10 in)	69 kg (152 lb)	298 cm (117 in)	285 cm (112 in)	(Poland) KS Pałac Bydgoszcz
28	Alicja Grabka	9 May 1998	1.78 m (5 ft 10 in)	62 kg (137 lb)	290 cm (110 in)	280 cm (110 in)	(Poland) Legionovia Legionowo

== Russia ==
The following is the Russian roster in the 2019 FIVB Volleyball Women's Nations League

Head coach: Alexander Krasilnikov

No.	Name	Date of birth	Height	Weight	Spike	Block	2018–19 club
1	Angelina Lazarenko	23 April 1998	1.93 m (6 ft 4 in)	80 kg (180 lb)	320 cm (130 in)	305 cm (120 in)	(France) Volero Le Cannet
3	Ekaterina Efimova (c)	3 July 1993	1.92 m (6 ft 4 in)	70 kg (150 lb)	305 cm (120 in)	295 cm (116 in)	(Russia) Dynamo Moscow
4	Daria Chikrizova	9 June 1990	1.77 m (5 ft 10 in)	69 kg (152 lb)	185 cm (73 in)	180 cm (71 in)	(Russia) Dinamo-Metar Chelyabinsk
5	Ekaterina Orlova	21 October 1987	1.93 m (6 ft 4 in)	77 kg (170 lb)	307 cm (121 in)	301 cm (119 in)	(Russia) Lokomotiv Kaliningrad
6	Irina Zaryazhko	4 October 1991	1.96 m (6 ft 5 in)	78 kg (172 lb)	305 cm (120 in)	290 cm (110 in)	(Russia) Dynamo Kazan
7	Tatiana Romanova	9 September 1994	1.78 m (5 ft 10 in)	64 kg (141 lb)	292 cm (115 in)	285 cm (112 in)	(Russia) Uralochka-NTMK
8	Nataliya Goncharova	1 June 1989	1.94 m (6 ft 4 in)	75 kg (165 lb)	315 cm (124 in)	306 cm (120 in)	(Russia) Dynamo Moscow
9	Alla Galkina	15 April 1992	1.78 m (5 ft 10 in)	65 kg (143 lb)	295 cm (116 in)	290 cm (110 in)	(Russia) Lokomotiv Kaliningrad
10	Ekaterina Evdokimova	10 September 1994	1.90 m (6 ft 3 in)	73 kg (161 lb)	306 cm (120 in)	285 cm (112 in)	(Russia) Uralochka-NTMK
11	Margarita Kurilo	21 June 1993	1.85 m (6 ft 1 in)	73 kg (161 lb)	304 cm (120 in)	290 cm (110 in)	(Russia) Yenisey Krasnoyarsk
12	Daria Ryseva	5 March 1998	1.75 m (5 ft 9 in)	69 kg (152 lb)	282 cm (111 in)	266 cm (105 in)	(Russia) Lokomotiv Kaliningrad
13	Yevgeniya Startseva	12 February 1989	1.85 m (6 ft 1 in)	68 kg (150 lb)	294 cm (116 in)	290 cm (110 in)	(Russia) Dynamo Kazan
16	Irina Voronkova	20 October 1995	1.90 m (6 ft 3 in)	84 kg (185 lb)	305 cm (120 in)	290 cm (110 in)	(Russia) Lokomotiv Kaliningrad
17	Valeriya Zaytseva	24 March 1995	1.87 m (6 ft 2 in)	71 kg (157 lb)	307 cm (121 in)	297 cm (117 in)	(Russia) Lokomotiv Kaliningrad
18	Ksenia Parubets	31 October 1994	1.83 m (6 ft 0 in)	64 kg (141 lb)	300 cm (120 in)	286 cm (113 in)	(Russia) Uralochka-NTMK
19	Maria Khaletskaya	31 July 1994	1.95 m (6 ft 5 in)	80 kg (180 lb)	311 cm (122 in)	302 cm (119 in)	(Russia) Dinamo Krasnodar
20	Maria Vorobyeva	24 February 1998	1.84 m (6 ft 0 in)	77 kg (170 lb)	306 cm (120 in)	288 cm (113 in)	(Russia) Zarechye Odintsovo
21	Anna Kotikova	13 October 1999	1.85 m (6 ft 1 in)	71 kg (157 lb)	306 cm (120 in)	300 cm (120 in)	(Russia) Dynamo Kazan
22	Tatiana Yurinskaya	25 January 1996	1.95 m (6 ft 5 in)	69 kg (152 lb)	305 cm (120 in)	275 cm (108 in)	(Russia) Zarechye Odintsovo
23	Olga Zubareva	8 November 1998	1.89 m (6 ft 2 in)	74 kg (163 lb)	305 cm (120 in)	297 cm (117 in)	(Russia) Dinamo Krasnodar
24	Kristina Kurnosova	5 November 1997	1.76 m (5 ft 9 in)	62 kg (137 lb)	288 cm (113 in)	278 cm (109 in)	(Russia) Zarechye Odintsovo
25	Sofya Kuznetsova	31 October 1999	1.82 m (6 ft 0 in)	65 kg (143 lb)	300 cm (120 in)	295 cm (116 in)	(Russia) Leningradka
26	Tatiana Kadochkina	21 March 2003	1.92 m (6 ft 4 in)	77 kg (170 lb)	310 cm (120 in)	292 cm (115 in)	(Russia) Dynamo Kazan
27	Polina Matveeva	8 August 2002	1.88 m (6 ft 2 in)	69 kg (152 lb)	300 cm (120 in)	285 cm (112 in)	(Russia) Dynamo Kazan
29	Viktoria Russu	16 February 1999	1.93 m (6 ft 4 in)	70 kg (150 lb)	311 cm (122 in)	305 cm (120 in)	(Russia) Zarechye Odintsovo

== Serbia ==
The following is the Serbian roster in the 2019 FIVB Volleyball Women's Nations League

Head coach: Zoran Terzić

No.	Name	Date of birth	Height	Weight	Spike	Block	2018–19 club
1	Bianka Buša	25 July 1994	1.87 m (6 ft 2 in)	74 kg (163 lb)	312 cm (123 in)	298 cm (117 in)	(Poland) KPS Chemik Police
2	Katarina Lazović	12 September 1999	1.82 m (6 ft 0 in)	65 kg (143 lb)	290 cm (110 in)	277 cm (109 in)	(Serbia) OK Vizura
4	Emilija Antanasijević	10 August 1994	1.80 m (5 ft 11 in)	72 kg (159 lb)	290 cm (110 in)	275 cm (108 in)	(Serbia) Jedinstvo Stara Pazova
5	Mina Popović	16 September 1994	1.87 m (6 ft 2 in)	73 kg (161 lb)	315 cm (124 in)	305 cm (120 in)	(Italy) II Bisonte Firenze
6	Maja Savić	14 August 1993	1.89 m (6 ft 2 in)	70 kg (150 lb)	305 cm (120 in)	295 cm (116 in)	(Serbia) Železničar Lajkovac
7	Katarina Jović	1 October 1999	1.91 m (6 ft 3 in)	76 kg (168 lb)	292 cm (115 in)	284 cm (112 in)	(France) Volero Le Cannet
8	Slađana Mirković	8 October 1995	1.85 m (6 ft 1 in)	78 kg (172 lb)	293 cm (115 in)	283 cm (111 in)	(Poland) KPS Chemik Police
9	Brankica Mihajlović (c)	13 April 1991	1.90 m (6 ft 3 in)	83 kg (183 lb)	302 cm (119 in)	290 cm (110 in)	(Japan) JT Marvelous
11	Stefana Veljković	9 January 1990	1.90 m (6 ft 3 in)	76 kg (168 lb)	325 cm (128 in)	310 cm (120 in)	(Italy) Igor Gorgonzola Novara
12	Teodora Pušić	16 October 1993	1.70 m (5 ft 7 in)	58 kg (128 lb)	270 cm (110 in)	260 cm (100 in)	(Romania) UVT Agroland Timișoara
13	Ana Bjelica	3 April 1992	1.90 m (6 ft 3 in)	78 kg (172 lb)	310 cm (120 in)	305 cm (120 in)	(France) Volero Le Cannet
14	Maja Aleksić	6 June 1997	1.88 m (6 ft 2 in)	72 kg (159 lb)	302 cm (119 in)	289 cm (114 in)	(Romania) CSM Volei Alba Blaj
18	Tijana Bošković	8 March 1997	1.93 m (6 ft 4 in)	82 kg (181 lb)	315 cm (124 in)	300 cm (120 in)	(Turkey) Eczacıbaşı VitrA
19	Bojana Milenković	6 March 1997	1.85 m (6 ft 1 in)	70 kg (150 lb)	294 cm (116 in)	288 cm (113 in)	(Italy) Scandicci
20	Jelena Blagojević	24 February 1988	1.81 m (5 ft 11 in)	67 kg (148 lb)	302 cm (119 in)	284 cm (112 in)	(Poland) Rzeszów
21	Jovana Kocić	24 February 1998	1.90 m (6 ft 3 in)	85 kg (187 lb)	290 cm (110 in)	285 cm (112 in)	(Serbia) OK Vizura
22	Sara Lozo	29 April 1997	1.86 m (6 ft 1 in)	61 kg (134 lb)	295 cm (116 in)	290 cm (110 in)	(Kazakhstan) Zhetyssu Almaty
23	Mila Đorđević	20 April 1998	1.80 m (5 ft 11 in)	58 kg (128 lb)	290 cm (110 in)	280 cm (110 in)	(Serbia) OK Crvena Zvezda
24	Aleksandra Cirović	30 September 1997	1.75 m (5 ft 9 in)	57 kg (126 lb)	285 cm (112 in)	275 cm (108 in)	(Romania) CSM Volei Alba Blaj
21	Sara Vučićević	29 April 1997	1.86 m (6 ft 1 in)	66 kg (146 lb)	287 cm (113 in)	282 cm (111 in)	(Serbia) OK Crvena Zvezda
28	Ana Pejićić	5 November 2000	1.90 m (6 ft 3 in)	69 kg (152 lb)	299 cm (118 in)	288 cm (113 in)	(Serbia) OK Vizura
29	Milica Kubura	20 March 1995	1.92 m (6 ft 4 in)	77 kg (170 lb)	297 cm (117 in)	280 cm (110 in)	(Serbia) OK Partizan
30	Aleksandra Tadić	24 December 1997	1.74 m (5 ft 9 in)	60 kg (130 lb)	270 cm (110 in)	265 cm (104 in)	(Serbia) TENT Obrenovac
31	Marija Popović	20 August 1996	1.62 m (5 ft 4 in)	60 kg (130 lb)	230 cm (91 in)	225 cm (89 in)	(United States) East Tennessee State
32	Bojana Gočanin	29 October 2002	1.79 m (5 ft 10 in)	66 kg (146 lb)	286 cm (113 in)	276 cm (109 in)	(Serbia) Takovo Zvezda Helios GM

== South Korea ==
The following is the Korean roster in the 2019 FIVB Volleyball Women's Nations League.

Head coach: (Italy) Stefano Lavarini

No.	Name	Date of birth	Height	Weight	Spike	Block	2018–19 club
1	Lee So-young	17 October 1994	1.76 m (5 ft 9 in)	68 kg (150 lb)	279 cm (110 in)	269 cm (106 in)	(South Korea) Seoul
2	Pyo Seung-ju	27 March 1999	1.82 m (6 ft 0 in)	76 kg (168 lb)	275 cm (108 in)	265 cm (104 in)	(South Korea) Seoul
3	Kim Hae-ran	16 March 1984	1.68 m (5 ft 6 in)	60 kg (130 lb)	270 cm (110 in)	250 cm (98 in)	(South Korea) Incheon
4	Kim Hee-jin	29 April 1991	1.86 m (6 ft 1 in)	75 kg (165 lb)	305 cm (120 in)	295 cm (116 in)	(South Korea) Hwaseong
5	Lee Hyo-hee	9 September 1980	1.73 m (5 ft 8 in)	58 kg (128 lb)	272 cm (107 in)	252 cm (99 in)	(South Korea) Gimcheon
6	An Hye-jin	16 February 1998	1.75 m (5 ft 9 in)	63 kg (139 lb)	270 cm (110 in)	250 cm (98 in)	(South Korea) Seoul
8	Yim Myung-ok	5 May 1986	1.75 m (5 ft 9 in)	62 kg (137 lb)	273 cm (107 in)	253 cm (100 in)	(South Korea) Gimcheon
9	Lee Ju-ah	21 August 2000	1.85 m (6 ft 1 in)	69 kg (152 lb)	282 cm (111 in)	272 cm (107 in)	(South Korea) Incheon
10	Kim Yeon-koung (c)	26 February 1988	1.92 m (6 ft 4 in)	73 kg (161 lb)	330 cm (130 in)	320 cm (130 in)	(Turkey) Eczacıbaşı VitrA
11	Kim Su-ji	11 July 1987	1.87 m (6 ft 2 in)	68 kg (150 lb)	283 cm (111 in)	273 cm (107 in)	(South Korea) Hwaseong
12	Jung Dae-young	12 August 1981	1.85 m (6 ft 1 in)	73 kg (161 lb)	279 cm (110 in)	269 cm (106 in)	(South Korea) Gimcheon
14	Park Eun-jin	15 December 1999	1.87 m (6 ft 2 in)	74 kg (163 lb)	293 cm (115 in)	283 cm (111 in)	(South Korea) Daejeon
15	Kang So-hwi	18 July 1997	1.80 m (5 ft 11 in)	65 kg (143 lb)	286 cm (113 in)	276 cm (109 in)	(South Korea) Seoul
16	Kim Yeong-yeon	1 December 1993	1.63 m (5 ft 4 in)	54 kg (119 lb)	267 cm (105 in)	247 cm (97 in)	(South Korea) Suwon
17	Lee Jae-yeong	15 October 1996	1.80 m (5 ft 11 in)	65 kg (143 lb)	289 cm (114 in)	279 cm (110 in)	(South Korea) Incheon
18	Moon Jung-won	24 March 1992	1.74 m (5 ft 9 in)	61 kg (134 lb)	271 cm (107 in)	261 cm (103 in)	(South Korea) Gimcheon
19	Lee Da-yeong	15 October 1996	1.80 m (5 ft 11 in)	63 kg (139 lb)	291 cm (115 in)	271 cm (107 in)	(South Korea) Suwon
20	Oh Ji-young	11 July 1988	1.70 m (5 ft 7 in)	63 kg (139 lb)	267 cm (105 in)	247 cm (97 in)	(South Korea) Daejeon
21	Lee Won-jung	12 January 2000	1.76 m (5 ft 9 in)	68 kg (150 lb)	269 cm (106 in)	249 cm (98 in)	(South Korea) Gimcheon
22	Jeong Ji-yun	1 January 2001	1.80 m (5 ft 11 in)	68 kg (150 lb)	283 cm (111 in)	273 cm (107 in)	(South Korea) Suwon
24	Lee Na-yeon	25 March 1992	1.73 m (5 ft 8 in)	62 kg (137 lb)	261 cm (103 in)	241 cm (95 in)	(South Korea) Hwaseong
26	Han Soo-ji	1 February 1989	1.82 m (6 ft 0 in)	72 kg (159 lb)	285 cm (9 ft 4 in)	275 cm (9 ft 0 in)	(South Korea) Daejeon
27	Ha Hye-jin	7 September 1996	1.81 m (5 ft 11 in)	60 kg (130 lb)	285 cm (112 in)	275 cm (108 in)	(South Korea) Gimcheon
29	Kim Hyun-jeong	28 August 1998	1.80 m (5 ft 11 in)	70 kg (150 lb)	272 cm (107 in)	262 cm (103 in)	(South Korea) Seoul
30	Choi Eun-ji	7 June 1992	1.83 m (6 ft 0 in)	72 kg (159 lb)	277 cm (109 in)	267 cm (105 in)	(South Korea) Daejeon

== Thailand ==
The following is the Thai roster in the 2019 FIVB Volleyball Women's Nations League.
Head coach: Danai Sriwatcharamethakul

No.	Name	Date of birth	Height	Weight	Spike	Block	2018–19 club
1	Wipawee Srithong	28 January 1999	1.74 m (5 ft 9 in)	62 kg (137 lb)	288 cm (9 ft 5 in)	266 cm (8 ft 9 in)	(Thailand) Chonburi
2	Piyanut Pannoy	10 November 1989	1.73 m (5 ft 8 in)	68 kg (150 lb)	280 cm (9 ft 2 in)	275 cm (9 ft 0 in)	(Thailand) Chonburi
3	Pornpun Guedpard	5 May 1993	1.74 m (5 ft 9 in)	65 kg (143 lb)	288 cm (9 ft 5 in)	279 cm (9 ft 2 in)	(Thailand) Khonkaen Star
4	Thatdao Nuekjang	3 February 1994	1.85 m (6 ft 1 in)	74 kg (163 lb)	308 cm (10 ft 1 in)	296 cm (9 ft 9 in)	(Thailand) Khonkaen Star
5	Pleumjit Thinkaow	9 November 1983	1.80 m (5 ft 11 in)	62 kg (137 lb)	305 cm (10 ft 0 in)	296 cm (9 ft 9 in)	(Thailand) Chonburi
6	Onuma Sittirak	13 June 1986	1.76 m (5 ft 9 in)	72 kg (159 lb)	304 cm (10 ft 0 in)	285 cm (9 ft 4 in)	(Thailand) Nakhon Ratchasima
8	Watchareeya Nuanjam	22 July 1996	1.78 m (5 ft 10 in)	64 kg (141 lb)	292 cm (9 ft 7 in)	279 cm (9 ft 2 in)	(Thailand) Chonburi
9	Wanitchaya Luangtonglang	8 October 1992	1.79 m (5 ft 10 in)	60 kg (130 lb)	300 cm (9 ft 10 in)	275 cm (9 ft 0 in)	(Thailand) Nakhon Ratchasima
10	Wilavan Apinyapong	6 June 1984	1.74 m (5 ft 9 in)	70 kg (150 lb)	294 cm (9 ft 8 in)	282 cm (9 ft 3 in)	(Thailand) Chonburi
11	Amporn Hyapha	19 May 1985	1.80 m (5 ft 11 in)	70 kg (150 lb)	301 cm (9 ft 11 in)	290 cm (9 ft 6 in)	(Thailand) Nakhon Ratchasima
12	Tapaphaipun Chaisri	29 November 1989	1.68 m (5 ft 6 in)	68 kg (150 lb)	295 cm (9 ft 8 in)	276 cm (9 ft 1 in)	(Thailand) Khonkaen Star
13	Nootsara Tomkom (c)	7 July 1985	1.70 m (5 ft 7 in)	57 kg (126 lb)	289 cm (9 ft 6 in)	278 cm (9 ft 1 in)	(Thailand) Nakhon Ratchasima
14	Chitaporn Kamlangmak	17 March 1996	1.86 m (6 ft 1 in)	75 kg (165 lb)	290 cm (9 ft 6 in)	282 cm (9 ft 3 in)	(Thailand) Khonkaen Star
15	Malika Kanthong	8 January 1987	1.78 m (5 ft 10 in)	69 kg (152 lb)	292 cm (9 ft 7 in)	278 cm (9 ft 1 in)	(Thailand) Nakhon Ratchasima
17	Tichaya Boonlert	14 February 1997	1.79 m (5 ft 10 in)	64 kg (141 lb)	293 cm (9 ft 7 in)	284 cm (9 ft 4 in)	(Thailand) Nakornnont
18	Ajcharaporn Kongyot	18 June 1995	1.80 m (5 ft 11 in)	65 kg (143 lb)	298 cm (9 ft 9 in)	287 cm (9 ft 5 in)	(Thailand) Chonburi
19	Chatchu-on Moksri	6 November 1999	1.80 m (5 ft 11 in)	58 kg (128 lb)	298 cm (9 ft 9 in)	290 cm (9 ft 6 in)	(Japan) PFU BlueCats
20	Supattra Pairoj	27 June 1990	1.60 m (5 ft 3 in)	58 kg (128 lb)	275 cm (9 ft 0 in)	265 cm (8 ft 8 in)	(Thailand) Chonburi
21	Kullapa Piampongsan	17 March 1991	1.78 m (5 ft 10 in)	60 kg (130 lb)	280 cm (9 ft 2 in)	274 cm (9 ft 0 in)	(Thailand) Khonkaen Star
22	Yupa Sanitklang	14 August 1991	1.67 m (5 ft 6 in)	60 kg (130 lb)	275 cm (9 ft 0 in)	260 cm (8 ft 6 in)	(Thailand) Nakhon Ratchasima
23	Jutarat Montripila	2 October 1986	1.75 m (5 ft 9 in)	60 kg (130 lb)	290 cm (9 ft 6 in)	280 cm (9 ft 2 in)	(Thailand) Nakornnont
24	Tichakorn Boonlert	22 March 2001	1.80 m (5 ft 11 in)	78 kg (172 lb)	294 cm (9 ft 8 in)	283 cm (9 ft 3 in)	(Thailand) Nakornnont
26	Thanacha Sooksod	26 May 2000	1.84 m (6 ft 0 in)	70 kg (150 lb)	283 cm (9 ft 3 in)	275 cm (9 ft 0 in)	(Thailand) Chonburi
27	Kaewkalaya Kamulthala	7 August 1994	1.78 m (5 ft 10 in)	66 kg (146 lb)	298 cm (9 ft 9 in)	281 cm (9 ft 3 in)	(Japan) JT Marvelous
28	Tikamporn Changkeaw	12 December 1984	1.68 m (5 ft 6 in)	62 kg (137 lb)	260 cm (8 ft 6 in)	252 cm (8 ft 3 in)	(Thailand) Nakhon Ratchasima

== Turkey ==
The following is the Turkish roster in the 2019 FIVB Volleyball Women's Nations League

Head coach: Giovanni Guidetti

No.	Name	Date of birth	Height	Weight	Spike	Block	2018–19 club
1	Hatice Gizem Örge	26 April 1993	1.72 m (5 ft 8 in)	59 kg (130 lb)	270 cm (110 in)	260 cm (100 in)	(Turkey) Vakıfbank Istanbul
2	Simge Şebnem Aköz	23 April 1991	1.68 m (5 ft 6 in)	56 kg (123 lb)	250 cm (98 in)	245 cm (96 in)	(Turkey) Eczacıbaşı VitrA
3	Cansu Özbay	17 October 1996	1.82 m (6 ft 0 in)	78 kg (172 lb)	298 cm (117 in)	290 cm (110 in)	(Turkey) Vakıfbank Istanbul
5	Şeyma Ercan	5 July 1994	1.87 m (6 ft 2 in)	73 kg (161 lb)	305 cm (120 in)	294 cm (116 in)	(Turkey) Türk Hava Yolları
6	Kübra Akman	13 October 1994	1.98 m (6 ft 6 in)	86 kg (190 lb)	310 cm (120 in)	310 cm (120 in)	(Turkey) Vakıfbank Istanbul
7	Hande Baladın	1 September 1997	1.90 m (6 ft 3 in)	81 kg (179 lb)	309 cm (122 in)	300 cm (120 in)	(Turkey) Galatasaray S.K.
8	Buse Ünal	29 July 1997	1.88 m (6 ft 2 in)	74 kg (163 lb)	299 cm (118 in)	290 cm (110 in)	(Turkey) Manisa
9	Meliha İsmailoğlu	17 September 1993	1.88 m (6 ft 2 in)	73 kg (161 lb)	303 cm (119 in)	291 cm (115 in)	(Turkey) Eczacıbaşı VitrA
10	Melis Durul	21 October 1993	1.85 m (6 ft 1 in)	73 kg (161 lb)	303 cm (119 in)	291 cm (115 in)	(Turkey) Vakıfbank Istanbul
11	Ezgi Dilik	12 June 1995	1.77 m (5 ft 10 in)	72 kg (159 lb)	288 cm (113 in)	280 cm (110 in)	(Turkey) Eczacıbaşı VitrA
12	Gözde Yılmaz	9 September 1991	1.94 m (6 ft 4 in)	79 kg (174 lb)	316 cm (124 in)	306 cm (120 in)	(Turkey) Eczacıbaşı VitrA
13	Meryem Çalık	3 February 1988	1.90 m (6 ft 3 in)	68 kg (150 lb)	323 cm (127 in)	313 cm (123 in)	(Turkey) Galatasaray S.K.
14	Eda Erdem Dündar (c)	22 June 1987	1.88 m (6 ft 2 in)	74 kg (163 lb)	307 cm (121 in)	397 cm (156 in)	(Turkey) Fenerbahçe
15	Ayçin Akyol	15 June 1999	1.88 m (6 ft 2 in)	72 kg (159 lb)	305 cm (120 in)	298 cm (117 in)	(Turkey) Ankara Karayollari
16	Yasemin Guveli	5 January 1999	1.88 m (6 ft 2 in)	72 kg (159 lb)	306 cm (120 in)	298 cm (117 in)	(Turkey) Ankara Karayollari
18	Zehra Güneş	7 July 1999	2.03 m (6 ft 8 in)	88 kg (194 lb)	319 cm (126 in)	310 cm (120 in)	(Turkey) Vakıfbank Istanbul
19	Aslı Kalaç	13 December 1995	1.85 m (6 ft 1 in)	73 kg (161 lb)	306 cm (120 in)	297 cm (117 in)	(Turkey) Galatasaray S.K.
20	Aylin Sarıoğlu	21 July 1995	1.69 m (5 ft 7 in)	68 kg (150 lb)	300 cm (120 in)	290 cm (110 in)	(Turkey) Nilüfer BS
21	Fatma Yıldırım	3 January 1990	1.80 m (5 ft 11 in)	64 kg (141 lb)	304 cm (120 in)	292 cm (115 in)	(Turkey) Fenerbahçe
22	Elif Şahin	19 January 2001	1.90 m (6 ft 3 in)	73 kg (161 lb)	300 cm (120 in)	291 cm (115 in)	(Turkey) Ankara Karayollari
23	Humay Topaloglu	3 August 1996	1.80 m (5 ft 11 in)	64 kg (141 lb)	300 cm (120 in)	290 cm (110 in)	(Turkey) Beşiktaş
34	Neriman Özsoy	13 July 1988	1.88 m (6 ft 2 in)	76 kg (168 lb)	312 cm (123 in)	300 cm (120 in)	(Japan) Toyota Auto Body Queenseis
88	Cansu Çetin	26 May 1993	1.81 m (5 ft 11 in)	69 kg (152 lb)	298 cm (117 in)	290 cm (110 in)	(Turkey) Galatasaray S.K.
90	Naz Aydemir	14 August 1990	1.86 m (6 ft 1 in)	68 kg (150 lb)	304 cm (120 in)	294 cm (116 in)	Free agent
99	Ebrar Karakurt	17 January 2000	1.96 m (6 ft 5 in)	73 kg (161 lb)	315 cm (124 in)	304 cm (120 in)	(Turkey) Vakıfbank Istanbul

== United States ==
The following is the American roster in the 2019 FIVB Volleyball Women's Nations League

Head coach: Karch Kiraly

No.	Name	Date of birth	Height	Weight	Spike	Block	2018–19 club
1	Micha Hancock	10 November 1992	1.80 m (5 ft 11 in)	76 kg (168 lb)	305 cm (120 in)	297 cm (117 in)	(Italy) Saugella Monza
2	Jordyn Poulter	31 July 1997	1.88 m (6 ft 2 in)	77 kg (170 lb)	306 cm (120 in)	296 cm (117 in)	(Italy) Chieri '76 Volleyball
3	Carli Lloyd	6 August 1989	1.80 m (5 ft 11 in)	75 kg (165 lb)	313 cm (123 in)	295 cm (116 in)	(Brazil) Praia Clube
5	Rachael Adams	3 June 1990	1.88 m (6 ft 2 in)	81 kg (179 lb)	318 cm (125 in)	307 cm (121 in)	(Italy) Saugella Monza
6	TeTori Dixon	4 August 1992	1.91 m (6 ft 3 in)	83 kg (183 lb)	306 cm (120 in)	295 cm (116 in)	(China) Beijing
7	Lauren Carlini	28 February 1995	1.85 m (6 ft 1 in)	77 kg (170 lb)	302 cm (119 in)	295 cm (116 in)	(Italy) Igor Gorgonzola Novara
8	Lauren Gibbemeyer	8 September 1988	1.87 m (6 ft 2 in)	71 kg (157 lb)	307 cm (121 in)	293 cm (115 in)	(Turkey) Eczacıbaşı VitrA
9	Madison Kingdon	20 April 1993	1.84 m (6 ft 0 in)	78 kg (172 lb)	307 cm (121 in)	298 cm (117 in)	(China) Beijing
10	Jordan Larson (c)	16 October 1986	1.90 m (6 ft 3 in)	75 kg (165 lb)	302 cm (119 in)	295 cm (116 in)	(Turkey) Eczacıbaşı VitrA
11	Andrea Drews	25 December 1993	1.91 m (6 ft 3 in)	77 kg (170 lb)	316 cm (124 in)	312 cm (123 in)	(Turkey) Beylikdüzü
12	Jordan Thompson	5 May 1997	1.93 m (6 ft 4 in)	70 kg (150 lb)	320 cm (130 in)	314 cm (124 in)	(Turkey) National Team
13	Sarah Wilhite	30 July 1996	1.85 m (6 ft 1 in)	75 kg (165 lb)	305 cm (120 in)	300 cm (120 in)	(Germany) Allianz MTV Stuttgart
14	Michelle Bartsch-Hackley	12 February 1990	1.90 m (6 ft 3 in)	78 kg (172 lb)	305 cm (120 in)	296 cm (117 in)	(Italy) Igor Gorgonzola Novara
15	Kim Hill	30 November 1989	1.93 m (6 ft 4 in)	72 kg (159 lb)	320 cm (130 in)	310 cm (120 in)	(Italy) Imoco Volley
17	Megan Courtney	27 October 1993	1.85 m (6 ft 1 in)	61 kg (134 lb)	314 cm (124 in)	300 cm (120 in)	(Italy) Volley Bergamo
18	Mikaela Foecke	22 February 1997	1.91 m (6 ft 3 in)	79 kg (174 lb)	302 cm (119 in)	295 cm (116 in)	(United States) National Team
19	Hannah Tapp	21 June 1995	1.91 m (6 ft 3 in)	77 kg (170 lb)	297 cm (117 in)	290 cm (110 in)	(Italy) Volley Bergamo
20	Dana Rettke	21 January 1999	2.03 m (6 ft 8 in)	80 kg (180 lb)	315 cm (124 in)	308 cm (121 in)	(United States) Free Agent
21	Simone Lee	7 October 1996	1.86 m (6 ft 1 in)	70 kg (150 lb)	310 cm (120 in)	305 cm (120 in)	(Turkey) Beylikdüzü
22	Haleigh Washington	22 September 1995	1.90 m (6 ft 3 in)	82 kg (181 lb)	307 cm (121 in)	295 cm (116 in)	(Italy) Volley Millenium Brescia
23	Kelsey Robinson	25 June 1992	1.88 m (6 ft 2 in)	73 kg (161 lb)	307 cm (121 in)	298 cm (117 in)	(Turkey) Vakıfbank Istanbul
24	Chiaka Ogbogu	15 April 1995	1.88 m (6 ft 2 in)	73 kg (161 lb)	318 cm (125 in)	307 cm (121 in)	(Poland) KPS Chemik Police
25	Karsta Lowe	2 February 1993	1.96 m (6 ft 5 in)	75 kg (165 lb)	315 cm (124 in)	305 cm (120 in)	(Italy) Imoco Volley
27	Mary Lake	16 September 1998	1.70 m (5 ft 7 in)	63 kg (139 lb)	263 cm (104 in)	257 cm (101 in)	(United States) National Team
32	Danielle Cuttino	22 June 1996	1.93 m (6 ft 4 in)	75 kg (165 lb)	324 cm (128 in)	316 cm (124 in)	(Italy) Pomì Casalmaggiore

== See also ==
- 2019 FIVB Men's Volleyball Nations League squads
- 2019 FIVB Volleyball Women's Challenger Cup squads
