= 2015 FIVB Volleyball Women's U23 World Championship squads =

This article shows the rosters of all participating teams at the Women's U23 World Championship 2015 in Turkey.

== Pool A ==
=== Turkey ===
The following is the Turkish roster in the 2015 FIVB Volleyball Women's U23 World Championship.

Head Coach: Ferhat Akbaş

No.	Name	Date of birth	Height	Weight	Spike	Block	2015 club
1	Hatice Gizem Örge	26 April 1993	1.70 m (5 ft 7 in)	59 kg (130 lb)	270 cm (110 in)	260 cm (100 in)	(Turkey) Vakıfbank
4	Ceylan Arısan	1 January 1994	1.93 m (6 ft 4 in)	79 kg (174 lb)	306 cm (120 in)	297 cm (117 in)	(Turkey) Eczacıbaşı
5	Kübra Akman	13 October 1994	1.97 m (6 ft 6 in)	89 kg (196 lb)	314 cm (124 in)	305 cm (120 in)	(Turkey) Vakıfbank
6	Dilara Bağcı	2 February 1994	1.65 m (5 ft 5 in)	62 kg (137 lb)	270 cm (110 in)	260 cm (100 in)	(Turkey) Eczacıbaşı
7	Hande Baladın	1 September 1997	1.89 m (6 ft 2 in)	71 kg (157 lb)	295 cm (116 in)	293 cm (115 in)	(Turkey) Eczacıbaşı
10	Ezgi Dağdelenler (C)	3 November 1993	1.84 m (6 ft 0 in)	69 kg (152 lb)	290 cm (110 in)	269 cm (106 in)	(Turkey) Ilbank
11	Melis Durul	21 October 1993	1.78 m (5 ft 10 in)	53 kg (117 lb)	280 cm (110 in)	275 cm (108 in)	(Turkey) Eczacıbaşı
15	Özge Nur Yurtdagülen	6 August 1993	1.90 m (6 ft 3 in)	67 kg (148 lb)	307 cm (121 in)	298 cm (117 in)	(Turkey) Galatasaray
16	Meliha İsmailoğlu	17 September 1993	1.88 m (6 ft 2 in)	70 kg (150 lb)	304 cm (120 in)	301 cm (119 in)	(Turkey) Fenerbahçe
17	Şeyma Ercan	5 July 1994	1.87 m (6 ft 2 in)	75 kg (165 lb)	302 cm (119 in)	295 cm (116 in)	(Turkey) Fenerbahçe
19	Ezgi Dilik	12 June 1995	1.70 m (5 ft 7 in)	60 kg (130 lb)	300 cm (120 in)	310 cm (120 in)	(Turkey) Fenerbahçe
20	Çağla Akın	19 January 1995	1.77 m (5 ft 10 in)	70 kg (150 lb)	287 cm (113 in)	280 cm (110 in)	(Turkey) Vakıfbank

=== Brazil ===
The following is the Brazilian roster in the 2015 FIVB Volleyball Women's U23 World Championship.

Head Coach: Wagner Coppini Fernandes

No.	Name	Date of birth	Height	Weight	Spike	Block	2015 club
1	Milka Silva	18 July 1994	1.90 m (6 ft 3 in)	75 kg (165 lb)	307 cm (121 in)	291 cm (115 in)	(Brazil) São Caetano
2	Naiane Rios	29 November 1994	1.79 m (5 ft 10 in)	63 kg (139 lb)	276 cm (109 in)	281 cm (111 in)	(Brazil) Minas Tênis Clube
5	Juma Silva	17 January 1993	1.81 m (5 ft 11 in)	68 kg (150 lb)	295 cm (116 in)	280 cm (110 in)	(Brazil) São Caetano
6	Saraelen Lima	16 April 1994	1.84 m (6 ft 0 in)	76 kg (168 lb)	302 cm (119 in)	282 cm (111 in)	(Brazil) Molico/Nestlé
8	Ana Paula Borgo	20 October 1993	1.87 m (6 ft 2 in)	76 kg (168 lb)	305 cm (120 in)	290 cm (110 in)	(Brazil) São Caetano
9	Rosamaria Montibeller (C)	9 April 1994	1.85 m (6 ft 1 in)	76 kg (168 lb)	291 cm (115 in)	285 cm (112 in)	(Brazil) Minas Tênis Clube
11	Valquiria Dullius	19 August 1994	1.88 m (6 ft 2 in)	72 kg (159 lb)	288 cm (113 in)	281 cm (111 in)	(Brazil) Minas Tênis Clube
12	Gabriella Souza	14 December 1993	1.75 m (5 ft 9 in)	69 kg (152 lb)	296 cm (117 in)	273 cm (107 in)	(Brazil) Molico/Nestlé
14	Juliana Fillipelli	17 September 1994	1.88 m (6 ft 2 in)	70 kg (150 lb)	304 cm (120 in)	301 cm (119 in)	(Brazil) SESI - SP
15	Drussyla Costa	1 July 1996	1.82 m (6 ft 0 in)	76 kg (168 lb)	298 cm (117 in)	284 cm (112 in)	(Brazil) Rexona-Ades
17	Kasiely Clemente	6 December 1993	1.81 m (5 ft 11 in)	62 kg (137 lb)	294 cm (116 in)	281 cm (111 in)	(Brazil) E C Pinheiros
19	Lorenne Teixeira	8 January 1996	1.87 m (6 ft 2 in)	76 kg (168 lb)	301 cm (119 in)	285 cm (112 in)	(Brazil) Rexona-Ades

=== Italy ===
The following is the Italian roster in the 2015 FIVB Volleyball Women's U23 World Championship.

Head Coach: Luca Cristofani

No.	Name	Date of birth	Height	Weight	Spike	Block	2015 club
2	Alice Degradi	4 October 1996	1.82 m (6 ft 0 in)	75 kg (165 lb)	312 cm (123 in)	300 cm (120 in)	(Italy) Yamamay Busto Arsizio
3	Carlotta Cambi	28 May 1996	1.77 m (5 ft 10 in)	66 kg (146 lb)	302 cm (119 in)	292 cm (115 in)	(Italy) Bakery Piacenza
4	Francesca Bosio	7 August 1997	1.80 m (5 ft 11 in)	69 kg (152 lb)	294 cm (116 in)	284 cm (112 in)	(Italy) Igor Gorgonzola Novara
6	Sofia D'Odorico (C)	6 January 1997	1.87 m (6 ft 2 in)	78 kg (172 lb)	312 cm (123 in)	302 cm (119 in)	(Italy) Club Italia
9	Sara Bonifacio	3 July 1996	1.88 m (6 ft 2 in)	76 kg (168 lb)	320 cm (130 in)	300 cm (120 in)	(Italy) Igor Volley Novara
10	Giulia Angelina	26 February 1997	1.90 m (6 ft 3 in)	89 kg (196 lb)	300 cm (120 in)	284 cm (112 in)	(Italy) Yamamay Busto Arsizio
11	Anna Danesi	20 April 1996	1.93 m (6 ft 4 in)	75 kg (165 lb)	301 cm (119 in)	284 cm (112 in)	(Italy) Club Italia
12	Anastasia Guerra	15 October 1996	1.87 m (6 ft 2 in)	80 kg (180 lb)	300 cm (120 in)	286 cm (113 in)	(Italy) Club Italia
13	Chiara De Bortoli	28 July 1997	1.80 m (5 ft 11 in)	68 kg (150 lb)	302 cm (119 in)	286 cm (113 in)	(Italy) Volley Pool Piave San Donà
15	Beatrice Berti	12 January 1996	1.93 m (6 ft 4 in)	87 kg (192 lb)	304 cm (120 in)	288 cm (113 in)	(Italy) Club Italia
16	Anna Nicoletti	3 January 1996	1.93 m (6 ft 4 in)	86 kg (190 lb)	306 cm (120 in)	290 cm (110 in)	(Italy) Club Italia
18	Elisa Zanette	17 February 1996	1.93 m (6 ft 4 in)	86 kg (190 lb)	304 cm (120 in)	288 cm (113 in)	(Italy) Igor Gorgonzola Novara

=== Bulgaria ===
The following is the Bulgarian roster in the 2015 FIVB Volleyball Women's U23 World Championship.

Head Coach: Atanas Lazarov

No.	Name	Date of birth	Height	Weight	Spike	Block	2015 club
1	Ralina Doshkova	7 June 1995	1.88 m (6 ft 2 in)	64 kg (141 lb)	303 cm (119 in)	295 cm (116 in)	(Bulgaria) CSKA
2	Mariya Dancheva	4 December 1995	1.93 m (6 ft 4 in)	73 kg (161 lb)	300 cm (120 in)	291 cm (115 in)	(Bulgaria) Maritza
6	Kristina Guncheva	24 March 1994	1.78 m (5 ft 10 in)	61 kg (134 lb)	282 cm (111 in)	271 cm (107 in)	(Bulgaria) TFSE
8	Milena Dimova	5 July 1994	1.89 m (6 ft 2 in)	61 kg (134 lb)	306 cm (120 in)	295 cm (116 in)	(Italy) Club Italia
9	Petya Barakova (C)	18 June 1994	1.80 m (5 ft 11 in)	76 kg (168 lb)	283 cm (111 in)	271 cm (107 in)	(Bulgaria) Levski
10	Gergana Dimitrova	28 February 1996	1.84 m (6 ft 0 in)	71 kg (157 lb)	305 cm (120 in)	288 cm (113 in)	(Bulgaria) Sm'Aesch
12	Miroslava Paskova	16 February 1996	1.80 m (5 ft 11 in)	67 kg (148 lb)	299 cm (118 in)	280 cm (110 in)	(Bulgaria) Levski
13	Kristina Yakimova	1 June 1994	1.80 m (5 ft 11 in)	66 kg (146 lb)	290 cm (110 in)	280 cm (110 in)	(Bulgaria) Levski Volley
14	Silvana Chausheva	19 May 1995	1.88 m (6 ft 2 in)	75 kg (165 lb)	305 cm (120 in)	290 cm (110 in)	(Bulgaria) Maritza
15	Zhana Todorova	6 January 1997	1.70 m (5 ft 7 in)	56 kg (123 lb)	271 cm (107 in)	255 cm (100 in)	(Bulgaria) Maritza
16	Simona Dimitrova	17 July 1994	1.85 m (6 ft 1 in)	82 kg (181 lb)	290 cm (110 in)	280 cm (110 in)	(Bulgaria) TFSE
18	Mira Todorova	12 April 1994	1.87 m (6 ft 2 in)	70 kg (150 lb)	312 cm (123 in)	300 cm (120 in)	(Bulgaria) Sm'Aesch

=== Colombia ===
The following is the Colombian roster in the 2015 FIVB Volleyball Women's U23 World Championship.

Head Coach: Eduardo Guillaume

No.	Name	Date of birth	Height	Weight	Spike	Block	2015 club
2	Yeisy Soto	17 April 1996	1.86 m (6 ft 1 in)	67 kg (148 lb)	290 cm (110 in)	299 cm (118 in)	(Colombia) Liga Bolivarense
5	Oriana Guerrero	5 May 1994	1.77 m (5 ft 10 in)	60 kg (130 lb)	290 cm (110 in)	280 cm (110 in)	(Colombia) Liga Bolivarense
6	Manuela Vargas	13 September 1996	1.73 m (5 ft 8 in)	75 kg (165 lb)	299 cm (118 in)	281 cm (111 in)	(Colombia) Liga Antioqueña
10	Diana Arrechea	14 September 1994	1.76 m (5 ft 9 in)	67 kg (148 lb)	293 cm (115 in)	278 cm (109 in)	(Colombia) Liga Vallecaucana
12	Ivonne Montaño	12 November 1995	1.87 m (6 ft 2 in)	72 kg (159 lb)	302 cm (119 in)	291 cm (115 in)	(Colombia) Liga Vallecaucana
13	Camila Gomez	6 July 1995	1.58 m (5 ft 2 in)	61 kg (134 lb)	263 cm (104 in)	260 cm (100 in)	(Colombia) Liga Vallecaucana
14	Valeria Alegrias	18 May 1998	1.82 m (6 ft 0 in)	72 kg (159 lb)	305 cm (120 in)	283 cm (111 in)	(Colombia) Liga Vallecaucana
15	Maria Alejandra Marin (C)	4 November 1995	1.78 m (5 ft 10 in)	68 kg (150 lb)	281 cm (111 in)	270 cm (110 in)	(Colombia) Liga Bolivarense
17	Daniela Castro	5 June 1993	1.84 m (6 ft 0 in)	53 kg (117 lb)	293 cm (115 in)	290 cm (110 in)	(Colombia) Liga Bolivarense
18	Maria Paula Caraballo	21 November 1999	1.87 m (6 ft 2 in)	50 kg (110 lb)	280 cm (110 in)	265 cm (104 in)	(Colombia) Liga Bolivarense
19	Maria Martinez	19 May 1995	1.78 m (5 ft 10 in)	74 kg (163 lb)	290 cm (110 in)	285 cm (112 in)	(Colombia) Liga Vallecaucana
20	Amanda Coneo	20 December 1996	1.77 m (5 ft 10 in)	58 kg (128 lb)	299 cm (118 in)	289 cm (114 in)	(Colombia) Liga Bolivarense

=== Egypt ===
The following is the Egyptian roster in the 2015 FIVB Volleyball Women's U23 World Championship.

Head Coach: Strahil Pantchev Balov

No.	Name	Date of birth	Height	Weight	Spike	Block	2015 club
2	Nehal Ahmed	25 January 1993	1.69 m (5 ft 7 in)	52 kg (115 lb)	275 cm (108 in)	262 cm (103 in)	(Egypt) Al Shams
4	Kenzie Assem	30 April 1994	1.77 m (5 ft 10 in)	73 kg (161 lb)	276 cm (109 in)	265 cm (104 in)	(Egypt) Heliopolis
6	Doaa Abdelghany	21 June 1996	1.85 m (6 ft 1 in)	70 kg (150 lb)	289 cm (114 in)	273 cm (107 in)	(Egypt) Zamalek
7	Farah Ahmed	12 July 1993	1.66 m (5 ft 5 in)	54 kg (119 lb)	271 cm (107 in)	266 cm (105 in)	(Egypt) Al Shams
10	Farida El Askalany (C)	14 February 1995	1.86 m (6 ft 1 in)	65 kg (143 lb)	278 cm (109 in)	264 cm (104 in)	(Egypt) Heliopolis
11	Aya Elshamy	27 November 1995	1.86 m (6 ft 1 in)	77 kg (170 lb)	297 cm (117 in)	279 cm (110 in)	(Egypt) Al Shams
12	Laila Abdelhamid	5 August 1995	1.83 m (6 ft 0 in)	76 kg (168 lb)	278 cm (109 in)	269 cm (106 in)	(Egypt) Heliopolis
15	Mariam Ebrahim	13 March 1997	1.67 m (5 ft 6 in)	63 kg (139 lb)	273 cm (107 in)	261 cm (103 in)	(Egypt) Al Shams
17	Aya Ahmed	27 April 1996	1.83 m (6 ft 0 in)	68 kg (150 lb)	270 cm (110 in)	262 cm (103 in)	(Egypt) Al Shams
18	Rahma Almohandes	9 November 1996	1.75 m (5 ft 9 in)	63 kg (139 lb)	277 cm (109 in)	265 cm (104 in)	(Egypt) Al Ahly
19	Mariam Ahmed	9 May 1995	1.68 m (5 ft 6 in)	57 kg (126 lb)	262 cm (103 in)	255 cm (100 in)	(Egypt) Al Ahly
20	Sarah Hanafy	15 April 1997	1.78 m (5 ft 10 in)	73 kg (161 lb)	265 cm (104 in)	255 cm (100 in)	(Egypt) Al Shams

== Pool B ==
=== Dominican Republic ===
The following is the Dominican roster in the 2015 FIVB Volleyball Women's U23 World Championship.

Head Coach: Wagner Pacheco

No.	Name	Date of birth	Height	Weight	Spike	Block	2015 club
1	Jineiry Martínez	3 December 1997	1.90 m (6 ft 3 in)	68 kg (150 lb)	305 cm (120 in)	280 cm (110 in)	(Dominican Republic) Mirador
2	Winifer Fernández	6 January 1995	1.69 m (5 ft 7 in)	62 kg (137 lb)	270 cm (110 in)	265 cm (104 in)	(Dominican Republic) Cien Fuego
3	Gaila González	25 June 1997	1.88 m (6 ft 2 in)	73 kg (161 lb)	304 cm (120 in)	276 cm (109 in)	(Dominican Republic) Mirador
7	María García	4 July 1996	1.84 m (6 ft 0 in)	71 kg (157 lb)	296 cm (117 in)	265 cm (104 in)	(Dominican Republic) Mirador
8	Michelle Polanco	26 February 1998	1.78 m (5 ft 10 in)	66 kg (146 lb)	268 cm (106 in)	239 cm (94 in)	(Dominican Republic) Villa Isabela
9	Angelica Hinojosa	19 January 1997	1.86 m (6 ft 1 in)	72 kg (159 lb)	305 cm (120 in)	279 cm (110 in)	(Dominican Republic) Cien Fuego
10	Pamela Soriano	30 June 1995	1.75 m (5 ft 9 in)	64 kg (141 lb)	290 cm (110 in)	287 cm (113 in)	(Dominican Republic) Mirador
12	Ayleen Rivero	19 May 1997	1.80 m (5 ft 11 in)	67 kg (148 lb)	240 cm (94 in)	231 cm (91 in)	(Dominican Republic) Deportivo Nacional
15	Celenia Toribio	17 July 1994	1.81 m (5 ft 11 in)	69 kg (152 lb)	290 cm (110 in)	286 cm (113 in)	(Dominican Republic) Cien Fuego
16	Yonkaira Peña	10 May 1993	1.90 m (6 ft 3 in)	70 kg (150 lb)	320 cm (130 in)	310 cm (120 in)	(Dominican Republic) Mirador
17	Larysmer Martínez	18 October 1996	1.74 m (5 ft 9 in)	68 kg (150 lb)	288 cm (113 in)	253 cm (100 in)	(Dominican Republic) Deportivo Nacional
20	Brayelin Martínez (C)	11 September 1996	2.01 m (6 ft 7 in)	83 kg (183 lb)	330 cm (130 in)	320 cm (130 in)	(Dominican Republic) Deportivo Nacional

=== Japan ===
The following is the Japanese roster in the 2015 FIVB Volleyball Women's U23 World Championship.

Head Coach: Kiyoshi Abo

No.	Name	Date of birth	Height	Weight	Spike	Block	2015 club
2	Yuka Imamura	2 September 1993	1.75 m (5 ft 9 in)	70 kg (150 lb)	295 cm (116 in)	293 cm (115 in)	(Japan) Aoyama Gakuin University
3	Mika Shibata	7 June 1994	1.70 m (5 ft 7 in)	64 kg (141 lb)	275 cm (108 in)	270 cm (110 in)	(Japan) Nippon Sport Science University
4	Misaki Shirai	30 July 1996	1.75 m (5 ft 9 in)	70 kg (150 lb)	293 cm (115 in)	278 cm (109 in)	(Japan) Toray Arrows
5	Misaki Yamauchi (C)	10 March 1995	1.72 m (5 ft 8 in)	69 kg (152 lb)	306 cm (120 in)	290 cm (110 in)	(Japan) Tokai University
6	Arisa Inoue	8 May 1995	1.80 m (5 ft 11 in)	67 kg (148 lb)	300 cm (120 in)	289 cm (114 in)	(Japan) University of Tsukuba
7	Mizuki Tanaka	28 January 1996	1.70 m (5 ft 7 in)	66 kg (146 lb)	298 cm (117 in)	286 cm (113 in)	(Japan) JT Marvelous
8	Yuka Kitsui	15 January 1997	1.72 m (5 ft 8 in)	60 kg (130 lb)	294 cm (116 in)	283 cm (111 in)	(Japan) JT Marvelous
9	Haruka Maruo	15 August 1996	1.76 m (5 ft 9 in)	64 kg (141 lb)	293 cm (115 in)	283 cm (111 in)	(Japan) University of Tsukuba
12	Moeri Hanai	17 April 1997	1.67 m (5 ft 6 in)	60 kg (130 lb)	280 cm (110 in)	272 cm (107 in)	(Japan) Kyoei Gakuen Senior HS
15	Shino Nakata	15 July 1997	1.78 m (5 ft 10 in)	66 kg (146 lb)	287 cm (113 in)	284 cm (112 in)	(Japan) Akita Kita HS
16	Nanaka Sakamoto	6 September 1996	1.76 m (5 ft 9 in)	65 kg (143 lb)	304 cm (120 in)	294 cm (116 in)	(Japan) Denso Airybees
19	Anna Koike	16 December 1996	1.62 m (5 ft 4 in)	62 kg (137 lb)	263 cm (104 in)	253 cm (100 in)	(Japan) Hitachi Rivale

=== China ===
The following is the Chinese roster in the 2015 FIVB Volleyball Women's U23 World Championship.

Head Coach: Xu Jiande

No.	Name	Date of birth	Height	Weight	Spike	Block	2015 club
2	Chen Xintong (C)	8 April 1994	1.78 m (5 ft 10 in)	69 kg (152 lb)	297 cm (117 in)	270 cm (110 in)	(China) Beijing
4	Xu Jiujing	13 July 1995	1.89 m (6 ft 2 in)	73 kg (161 lb)	316 cm (124 in)	305 cm (120 in)	(China) Shanghai
5	Qin Siyu	2 May 1994	1.84 m (6 ft 0 in)	65 kg (143 lb)	305 cm (120 in)	300 cm (120 in)	(China) Shanghai
7	Cheng Long	10 January 1995	1.85 m (6 ft 1 in)	75 kg (165 lb)	305 cm (120 in)	295 cm (116 in)	(China) Shandong
8	Song Meili	23 February 1995	1.86 m (6 ft 1 in)	75 kg (165 lb)	310 cm (120 in)	300 cm (120 in)	(China) Shandong
9	Duan Fang	26 December 1994	1.86 m (6 ft 1 in)	73 kg (161 lb)	301 cm (119 in)	296 cm (117 in)	(China) Liaoning
10	Zheng Yixin	6 May 1995	1.87 m (6 ft 2 in)	69 kg (152 lb)	305 cm (120 in)	300 cm (120 in)	(China) Fujian
12	Wang Qi	22 September 1993	1.87 m (6 ft 2 in)	70 kg (150 lb)	305 cm (120 in)	300 cm (120 in)	(China) Bayi
14	Huang Liuyan	13 June 1994	1.78 m (5 ft 10 in)	66 kg (146 lb)	297 cm (117 in)	290 cm (110 in)	(China) Bayi
16	Li Yao	23 October 1995	1.86 m (6 ft 1 in)	75 kg (165 lb)	310 cm (120 in)	300 cm (120 in)	(China) Guangdong
19	Li Weiwei	17 November 1994	1.90 m (6 ft 3 in)	74 kg (163 lb)	312 cm (123 in)	310 cm (120 in)	(China) Henan
20	Fan Xiangchen	8 July 1993	1.84 m (6 ft 0 in)	70 kg (150 lb)	308 cm (121 in)	393 cm (155 in)	(China) Henan

=== Thailand ===
The following is the Thai roster in the 2015 FIVB Volleyball Women's U23 World Championship.

Head Coach: Nataphon Srisamutnak

No.	Name	Date of birth	Height	Weight	Spike	Block	2015 club
3	Pornpun Guedpard (C)	5 May 1993	1.72 m (5 ft 8 in)	63 kg (139 lb)	310 cm (120 in)	287 cm (113 in)	(Thailand) Bangkok Glass
4	Thatdao Nuekjang	3 February 1994	1.83 m (6 ft 0 in)	66 kg (146 lb)	305 cm (120 in)	287 cm (113 in)	(Thailand) Idea Khonkaen
7	Hattaya Bamrungsuk	12 August 1993	1.80 m (5 ft 11 in)	70 kg (150 lb)	300 cm (120 in)	289 cm (114 in)	(Thailand) Nakhon Ratchasima
8	Patcharaporn Sittisad	20 February 1996	1.69 m (5 ft 7 in)	52 kg (115 lb)	288 cm (113 in)	273 cm (107 in)	(Thailand) Supreme Chonburi
9	Jarasporn Bundasak	1 March 1993	1.82 m (6 ft 0 in)	66 kg (146 lb)	292 cm (115 in)	282 cm (111 in)	(Thailand) Bangkok Glass
12	Sineenat Phocharoen	19 May 1995	1.74 m (5 ft 9 in)	53 kg (117 lb)	287 cm (113 in)	270 cm (110 in)	(Thailand) Thai-Denmark Nongrua
14	Parinya Pankaew	27 December 1995	1.70 m (5 ft 7 in)	59 kg (130 lb)	281 cm (111 in)	271 cm (107 in)	(Thailand) Supreme Chonburi
15	Kaewkalaya Kamulthala	7 August 1994	1.79 m (5 ft 10 in)	66 kg (146 lb)	298 cm (117 in)	281 cm (111 in)	(Thailand) Idea Khonkaen
17	Tichaya Boonlert	14 February 1997	1.78 m (5 ft 10 in)	64 kg (141 lb)	291 cm (115 in)	283 cm (111 in)	(Thailand) 3BB Nakhonnon
18	Ajcharaporn Kongyot	18 June 1995	1.80 m (5 ft 11 in)	66 kg (146 lb)	296 cm (117 in)	285 cm (112 in)	(Thailand) Supreme Chonburi
19	Chatchu-on Moksri	6 November 1999	1.77 m (5 ft 10 in)	63 kg (139 lb)	298 cm (117 in)	295 cm (116 in)	(Thailand) Ayutthaya A.T.C.C
20	Pimpichaya Kokram	16 June 1998	1.76 m (5 ft 9 in)	57 kg (126 lb)	291 cm (115 in)	281 cm (111 in)	(Thailand) 3BB Nakhonnon

=== Peru ===
The following is the Peruvian roster in the 2015 FIVB Volleyball Women's U23 World Championship.

Head Coach: Natalia Malaga

No.	Name	Date of birth	Height	Weight	Spike	Block	2015 club
2	Nair Canessa	4 June 1997	1.85 m (6 ft 1 in)	70 kg (150 lb)	295 cm (116 in)	298 cm (117 in)	(Peru) Deportivo Géminis
4	Cristina Cuba	4 June 1996	1.76 m (5 ft 9 in)	65 kg (143 lb)	280 cm (110 in)	275 cm (108 in)	(Peru) Regatas Lima
5	Shiamara Almeida	19 February 1996	1.72 m (5 ft 8 in)	62 kg (137 lb)	286 cm (113 in)	275 cm (108 in)	(Peru) Sporting Cristal
6	Katherinne Olemar	10 May 1993	1.76 m (5 ft 9 in)	65 kg (143 lb)	293 cm (115 in)	280 cm (110 in)	(Peru) Sporting Cristal
7	Andrea Urrutia	31 May 1997	1.85 m (6 ft 1 in)	65 kg (143 lb)	278 cm (109 in)	275 cm (108 in)	(Peru) Universidad San Martín
8	Maguilaura Frias	28 May 1997	1.86 m (6 ft 1 in)	71 kg (157 lb)	291 cm (115 in)	280 cm (110 in)	(Peru) Universidad San Martín
10	Ginna Lopez	28 May 1994	1.91 m (6 ft 3 in)	66 kg (146 lb)	319 cm (126 in)	298 cm (117 in)	(Peru) Alianza Lima
11	Clarivett Yllescas (C)	11 August 1993	1.85 m (6 ft 1 in)	63 kg (139 lb)	305 cm (120 in)	295 cm (116 in)	(Peru) Universidad César Vallejo
12	Angela Leyva	22 November 1996	1.82 m (6 ft 0 in)	70 kg (150 lb)	315 cm (124 in)	291 cm (115 in)	(Peru) Universidad San Martín
13	Yomira Villacorta	11 January 1996	1.64 m (5 ft 5 in)	61 kg (134 lb)	265 cm (104 in)	250 cm (98 in)	(Peru) Deportivo Jaamsa
18	Coraima Gomez	9 August 1996	1.77 m (5 ft 10 in)	70 kg (150 lb)	280 cm (110 in)	275 cm (108 in)	(Peru) Alianza Lima

=== Cuba ===
The following is the Cuban roster in the 2015 FIVB Volleyball Women's U23 World Championship.

Head Coach: Wilfredo Robinson Pupo

No.	Name	Date of birth	Height	Weight	Spike	Block	2015 club
1	Diana Castillo	4 March 2000	1.77 m (5 ft 10 in)	74 kg (163 lb)	304 cm (120 in)	290 cm (110 in)	(Cuba) Pinar Del Río
3	Laura Suarez	13 December 1998	1.85 m (6 ft 1 in)	75 kg (165 lb)	304 cm (120 in)	292 cm (115 in)	(Cuba) Pinar Del Río
5	Yelennis Diaz	14 October 1995	1.89 m (6 ft 2 in)	71 kg (157 lb)	300 cm (120 in)	298 cm (117 in)	(Cuba) Villa Crara
6	Mirta Derrick	30 August 1995	1.86 m (6 ft 1 in)	64 kg (141 lb)	248 cm (98 in)	246 cm (97 in)	(Cuba) Pinar Del Río
7	Yeney Leon	29 September 1996	1.96 m (6 ft 5 in)	75 kg (165 lb)	315 cm (124 in)	305 cm (120 in)	(Cuba) La Habana
8	Anet Alfonso	26 June 1996	1.72 m (5 ft 8 in)	54 kg (119 lb)	225 cm (89 in)	222 cm (87 in)	(Cuba) Camaguey
9	Dalisbel Gutierrez	2 April 1998	1.78 m (5 ft 10 in)	62 kg (137 lb)	230 cm (91 in)	227 cm (89 in)	(Cuba) Cienfuegos
13	Sonia Romero	2 August 1997	1.83 m (6 ft 0 in)	70 kg (150 lb)	301 cm (119 in)	288 cm (113 in)	(Cuba) La Habana
15	Yadidsa Rumbaut	15 April 1997	1.70 m (5 ft 7 in)	70 kg (150 lb)	300 cm (120 in)	296 cm (117 in)	(Cuba) Cienfuegos
16	Dayami Sánchez	14 March 1994	1.88 m (6 ft 2 in)	64 kg (141 lb)	314 cm (124 in)	302 cm (119 in)	(Cuba) Ciudad Habana
17	Claudia Hernández (C)	9 January 1997	1.81 m (5 ft 11 in)	78 kg (172 lb)	225 cm (89 in)	223 cm (88 in)	(Cuba) La Bahana

== See also ==
- 2015 FIVB Volleyball Men's U23 World Championship squads
