= Barueri (disambiguation) =

Barueri may refer to:

- Barueri, a municipality located in São Paulo state, Brazil
- Grêmio Barueri Futebol, a Brazilian football (soccer) club
- Sport Club Barueri, a Brazilian football (soccer) club
- Grêmio Recreativo Barueri (women's volleyball), a Brazilian women's volleyball club
- Arena Barueri, a multi-use stadium located in Barueri, Brazil
