= Bulgaria women's national under-23 volleyball team =

Youth volleyball team representing Bulgaria

Bulgaria
- Association: Bulgarian Volleyball Federation
- Confederation: CEV

Uniforms
| Home | Away |

FIVB U23 World Championship
- Appearances: 2 (First in 2015)
- Best result: (bronze) Bronze : (2017)

The Bulgaria women's national under-23 volleyball team represents Bulgaria in international women's volleyball competitions and friendly matches under the age 23 and it is ruled by the Bulgarian Volleyball Federation That is an affiliate of International Volleyball Federation FIVB and also a part of European Volleyball Confederation CEV.

== Results ==
=== FIVB U23 World Championship ===
Champions Runners up Third place Fourth place

FIVB U23 World Championship
| Year | Round | Position | Pld | W | L | SW | SL | Squad |
|---|---|---|---|---|---|---|---|---|
| (Mexico) 2013 | Didn't Qualify | | | | | | | |
| (Turkey) 2015 | | 7th | | | | | | Squad |
| (Slovenia) 2017 | | Third | | | | | | Squad |
| Total | 0 Titles | 2/3 | | | | | | |

== Team ==
=== Current squad ===
The following is the Bulgarian roster in the 2017 FIVB Women's U23 World Championship.

Head coach: Antonina Zetova

| No. | Name | Date of birth | Height | Weight | Spike | Block | 2016–2017 club |
|---|---|---|---|---|---|---|---|
| 1 | Gergana Dimitrova (c) | 28 February 1996 | 1.84 m (6 ft 0 in) | 71 kg (157 lb) | 305 cm (120 in) | 288 cm (113 in) | (France) RC Cannes |
| 2 | Polina Neykova | 7 October 1998 | 1.82 m (6 ft 0 in) | 73 kg (161 lb) | 287 cm (113 in) | 280 cm (110 in) | (Bulgaria) CSKA Volley |
| 3 | Vangeliya Rachkovska | 19 July 1997 | 1.85 m (6 ft 1 in) | 67 kg (148 lb) | 296 cm (117 in) | 281 cm (111 in) | (Bulgaria) Maritza Volley |
| 4 | Iveta Stanchulova | 11 August 1997 | 1.86 m (6 ft 1 in) | 72 kg (159 lb) | 290 cm (110 in) | 285 cm (112 in) | (Bulgaria) CSKA Volley |
| 5 | Mirela Shahpazova | 28 October 1997 | 1.75 m (5 ft 9 in) | 65 kg (143 lb) | 280 cm (110 in) | 270 cm (110 in) | (Bulgaria) Maritza Volley |
| 6 | Miroslava Paskova | 16 February 1996 | 1.80 m (5 ft 11 in) | 67 kg (148 lb) | 299 cm (118 in) | 280 cm (110 in) | (Bulgaria) Rzeszów Volley |
| 7 | Monika Krasteva | 9 May 1999 | 1.83 m (6 ft 0 in) | 64 kg (141 lb) | 292 cm (115 in) | 285 cm (112 in) | (Bulgaria) Levski Volley |
| 8 | Ralina Doshkova | 7 June 1995 | 1.88 m (6 ft 2 in) | 64 kg (141 lb) | 292 cm (115 in) | 285 cm (112 in) | (Bulgaria) CSKA Volley |
| 10 | Elitsa Barakova | 11 March 1997 | 1.84 m (6 ft 0 in) | 60 kg (130 lb) | 290 cm (110 in) | 280 cm (110 in) | (Bulgaria) Kazanlak Volley |
| 12 | Mariya Dancheva | 4 December 1995 | 1.95 m (6 ft 5 in) | 73 kg (161 lb) | 314 cm (124 in) | 302 cm (119 in) | (Bulgaria) Maritza Volley |
| 14 | Silvana Chausheva | 19 May 1995 | 1.88 m (6 ft 2 in) | 75 kg (165 lb) | 305 cm (120 in) | 290 cm (110 in) | (Bulgaria) Maritza Volley |
| 15 | Zhana Todorova | 6 January 1997 | 1.70 m (5 ft 7 in) | 56 kg (123 lb) | 271 cm (107 in) | 255 cm (100 in) | (Bulgaria) Maritza Volley |

== See also ==
- Bulgaria women's team
- Bulgaria women's U18 team
- Bulgaria women's U20 team
- Bulgaria women's U23 team
- Bulgaria men's team
