= Milena Dimova =

Bulgarian volleyball player (born 1994)

Personal information
- Nationality: Bulgaria
- Born: 17 July 1994 (age 32); Plovdiv
- Height: 1.89 m (6 ft 2 in)
- Weight: 61 kg (134 lb)
- Spike: 306 cm (120 in)
- Block: 295 cm (116 in)

Career
Teams
	Bulgaria VK Maritsa Plovdiv

Milena Dimova (born 17 July 1994) is a Bulgarian female volleyball player, playing as aн opposite. She is part of the Bulgaria women's national volleyball team. She competed at the 2015 FIVB Volleyball Women's U23 World Championship, and at the 2015 FIVB World Grand Prix.
