= Naiane Rios =

Brazilian volleyball player (born 1994)

Personal information
- Full name: Naiane de Almeida Rios
- Born: 29 November 1994 (age 31); Belém, Pará, Brazil
- Height: 1.80 m (5 ft 11 in)
- Weight: 63 kg (139 lb)
- Spike: 276 cm (109 in)
- Block: 281 cm (111 in)

Volleyball information
- Position: Setter
- Current club: Pinheiros
- Number: 3

National team
2016–2017	Brazil
Honours
Women's volleyball
Representing Brazil
World Grand Champions Cup
Silver medal – second place	2017 Japan	Team
Pan American Games
Silver medal – second place	2023 Santiago
Montreux Volley Masters
Gold medal – first place	2017 Switzerland	Team
U23 World Championship
Gold medal – first place	2015 Ankara
U20 World Championship
Bronze medal – third place	2013 Brno
U20 South American Championship
Gold medal – first place	2012 Lima
U18 South American Championship
Gold medal – first place	2010 Peru

Naiane Rios (born 29 November 1994) is a Brazilian female volleyball player. She competed at the 2015 U23 World Championship. and 2017 FIVB Volleyball World Grand Prix.

== Personal life ==
Rios is openly lesbian.

== Clubs ==
- (Brazil) Oi Macaé (2010–2011)
- (Brazil) E.C. Pinheiros (2011–2014)
- (Brazil) Minas Tênis Clube (2014–2017)
- (Brazil) Hinode Barueri (2017–2018)
- (Brazil) Vôlei Bauru (2018–2020)
- (Brazil) Osasco/Audax (2020-)

== Awards ==
=== Individuals ===
- 2010 CSV U17 South American Championship – "Best Setter"
- 2012 CSV U19 South American Championship – "Best Setter"
