= Simona Dimitrova =

Bulgarian volleyball player (born 1994)

Personal information
- Nationality: Bulgaria
- Born: 17 July 1994 (age 32); Plovdiv
- Height: 1.85 m (6 ft 1 in)
- Weight: 82 kg (181 lb)
- Spike: 290 cm (110 in)
- Block: 280 cm (110 in)

Career
Teams
| | Bulgaria VK Maritsa Plovdiv |

Simona Dimitrova (Bulgarian: Симона Димитрова, born 17 July 1994 in Plovdiv) is a Bulgarian female volleyball player. She is part of the Bulgaria women's national volleyball team. She competed at the 2015 FIVB Volleyball Women's U23 World Championship, 2015 European Games in Baku, and at the 2015 FIVB World Grand Prix.

At club level she played for TFSE in 2015.
