= Zé Roberto (volleyball) =

Brazilian volleyball player and coach

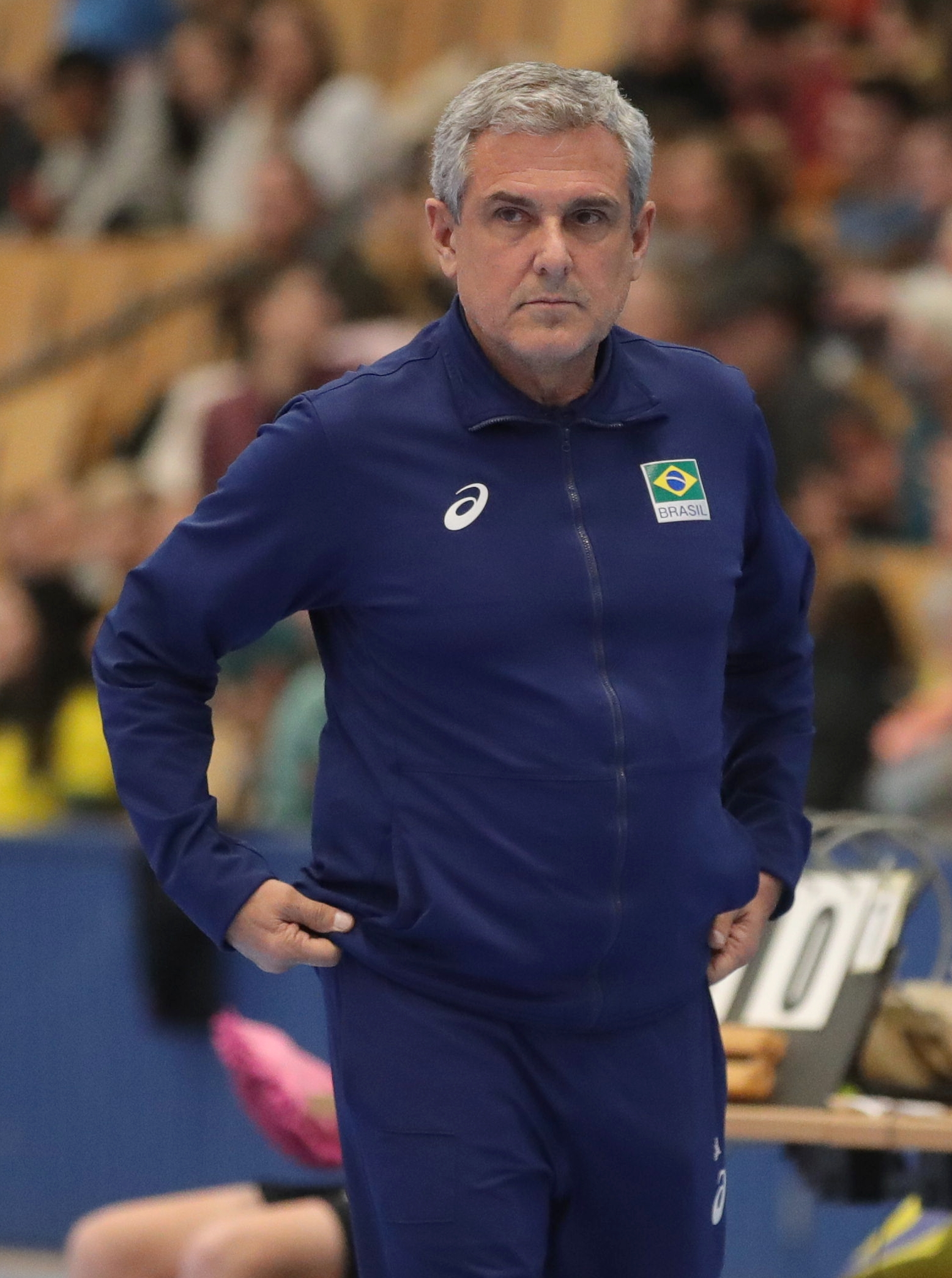
- Zé Roberto in 2022

Personal information
- Full name: José Roberto Guimarães
- Nickname: Zé Roberto
- Nationality: (Brazil) Brazilian
- Born: 31 July 1954 (age 72) Quintana, São Paulo, Brazil
- Height: 1.77 m (5 ft 10 in)
- Weight: 69 kg (152 lb)

Coaching information
- Current team: São Paulo Barueri
- Previous teams coached
- Years: Teams
- 1988–1992; 1996–1997; 1997–1998; 2000–2005; 2005–2006; 2006–2009; 2010–2012; 2012–2014; 2016–present: São Caetano; Brasil Vôlei Clube; Aché Clube; Bradesco Osasco; Unisul Esporte Clube; Volley Pesaro; Fenerbahçe; Minas Tênis Clube; São Paulo Barueri

Volleyball information
- Position: Setter

National team
- Years: Team
- 1973–1976: Brazil
- 1989–1996: Brazil (men)
- 2003–: Brazil (women)
Honours
Coach for men's volleyball
Representing Brazil
Olympic Games
Gold medal – first place	1992 Barcelona	Team
World Cup
Bronze medal – third place	1995 Japan	Team
World League
Gold medal – first place	1993 São Paulo	Team
Silver medal – second place	1995 Rio de Janeiro	Team
Bronze medal – third place	1994 Milan	Team
Coach for women's volleyball
Representing Brazil
Olympic Games
Gold medal – first place	2008 Beijing	Team
Gold medal – first place	2012 London	Team
Silver medal – second place	2020 Tokyo	Team
Bronze medal – third place	2024 Paris	Team
World Championship
Silver medal – second place	2006 Japan	Team
Silver medal – second place	2010 Japan	Team
Bronze medal – third place	2014 Italy	Team
Silver medal – second place	2022 Netherlands/Poland	Team
World Cup
Silver medal – second place	2003 Japan	Team
Silver medal – second place	2007 Japan	Team
World Grand Champions Cup
Gold medal – first place	2005 Japan	Team
Gold medal – first place	2013 Japan	Team
Silver medal – second place	2009 Japan	Team
Silver medal – second place	2017 Japan	Team
Nations League
Silver medal – second place	2019 Nanjing	Team
Silver medal – second place	2026 Macao	Team
World Grand Prix
Gold medal – first place	2004 Reggio Calabria	Team
Gold medal – first place	2005 Sendai	Team
Gold medal – first place	2006 Reggio Calabria	Team
Gold medal – first place	2008 Yokohama	Team
Gold medal – first place	2009 Tokyo	Team
Gold medal – first place	2013 Sapporo	Team
Gold medal – first place	2014 Tokyo	Team
Gold medal – first place	2016 Bangkok	Team
Gold medal – first place	2017 Nanjing	Team
Silver medal – second place	2010 Ningbo	Team
Silver medal – second place	2011 Macau	Team
Silver medal – second place	2012 Ningbo	Team
U20 World Championship
Silver medal – second place	1991 Brno	Team
Coach for women's volleyball
Representing (Turkey) Fenerbahçe
Club World Championship
Gold medal – first place	2010 Doha	Team
CEV Champions League
Gold medal – first place	2012 Baku	Team
Bronze medal – third place	2011 Istanbul	Team

José Roberto Lages Guimarães (Brazilian Portuguese pronunciation: [ʒoˈzɛ ʁoˈbɛʁtu ˈlaɡiz ɡimaˈɾɐ̃js]; born 31 July 1954), known as Zé Roberto, is a Brazilian former volleyball player and current coach. He currently coaches Grêmio Recreativo Barueri. He played volleyball between years 1967–1988 as a professional player and has coached since 1988. He first coached Brazilian women team Eletropaulo. He competed in the men's tournament at the 1976 Summer Olympics. He is the brother of the coach of the Brazilian National Sitting Volleyball Team Fernando Guimarães.

He coached Brazil Men team between 1992–96, winning an olympic gold medal in Barcelona 1992. Since 2003 he has coached the Brazil Women team, winning two gold medals, in Beijing 2008 and London 2012, a silver medal in Tokyo 2020, and a bronze medal in Paris 2024.

He was inducted into the International Volleyball Hall of Fame in 2024.

== Career ==
=== As a player ===
Club	Country	During
Randi Esporte Clube	Brazil	1967–1979
Pirelli/Santo André	Brazil	1979–1982
Olímpico	Brazil	1982–1983
Atlético Mineiro	Brazil	1983–1984
Paulistano	Brazil	1984–1985
Banespa	Brazil	1985–1986
Transbrasil	Brazil	1986–1987
ASBAC	Brazil	1987–1988

=== As a coach ===
Club	Country	During
Pão de Açúcar	Brazil	1989–1992
Brazil (men)	Brazil	1992–1996
Banespa	Brazil	1996–1997
Dayvit	Brazil	1997–1998
BCN	Brazil	2001–2003
Brazil (women)	Brazil	2003–
Finasa/Osasco	Brazil	2003–2005
Scavolini Pesaro	Italy	2006–2009
Fenerbahçe	Turkey	2010–2012
Campinas Vôlei Amil	Brazil	2012–2014
São Paulo	Brazil	2016–

== Individual awards ==
- 2003 - CBV - Best Coach
- 2006 - Panamerican Cup - Best Coach
- 2013 - Brazilian Olympic Committee - Best Coach of Year
- 2014 - FIVB World Grand Prix - Best Coach
- 2014 - FIVB World Championship - Fair Play Award
