= Sun Yan (volleyball) =

Chinese volleyball player (born 2001)

Yan Sun (born 6 July 2001) is a Chinese volleyball player.

She is a member and setter of the China women's national volleyball team. On the club level, she plays for Jiangsu Zenith Steel.

== Career ==
She competed at the 2019 FIVB Volleyball Women's U20 World Championship, and 2019 FIVB Volleyball Women's Nations League.
