= Grêmio Recreativo Barueri (women's volleyball) =

Women's volleyball team based in Brazil

Hinode Barueri
- Full name: Grêmio Recreativo Barueri
- Founded: 2016
- Ground: José Corrêa, Barueri
- Manager: José Roberto Guimarães
- League: Brazilian Superliga
- 2017–18: 5th
- Website: Club home page

Uniforms
Home	Away

Hinode Barueri is a women's volleyball team, based in Barueri, São Paulo (state), Brazil.

== History ==
The women's volleyball team was founded in 2016, and finished the 2017 Paulista Championship (São Paulo State Championship) in second, losing to Osasco Voleibol Clube. The team played the main division of the Brazilian Women's Volleyball Superliga for the first time in the season 2017/2018 and finished in fifth place.

== Team ==
Season 2019-2020 squad - As of October 2019

- Head coach: (Brazil) José Roberto Guimarães

Team roster - season 2019–2020
Number	Player	Position	Height (m)	Birth date
1	(Brazil) Daniela Guimarães	Libero	1.66	July 29, 1994 (age 31)
2	(Brazil) Diana Alecrim	Middle Blocker	1.94	February 22, 1999 (age 26)
3	(Brazil) Juma Silva	Setter	1.81	January 17, 1993 (age 32)
4	(Brazil) Maira Claro	Outside Hitter	1.87	March 7, 1995 (age 30)
6	(Brazil) Nyeme Costa	Libero	1.75	October 11, 1998 (age 27)
7	(Brazil) Lays Freitas	Middle Blocker	1.85	October 13, 1995 (age 30)
8	(Brazil) Jheovana Sebastião	Opposite	1.94	January 10, 2001 (age 24)
9	(Brazil) Kisy Nascimento	Opposite	1.90	January 28, 2000 (age 25)
10	(Brazil) Tainara Santos	Outside Hitter	1.90	March 9, 2000 (age 25)
11	(Brazil) Lorenne Teixeira	Opposite	1.87	January 8, 1996 (age 29)
12	(Brazil) Larissa Besen	Middle blocker	1.88	March 2, 2001 (age 24)
13	(Brazil) Jackeline Santos	Setter	1.74	December 30, 1999 (age 25)
16	(Brazil) Caroline Santos	Opposite	1.90	June 28, 2002 (age 23)
17	(Brazil) Moara Santos	Outside Hitter	1.78	February 14, 2001 (age 24)
18	(Brazil) Mayany de Souza	Middle Blocker	1.85	November 24, 1996 (age 29)

Team roster - season 2018–2019
Number	Player	Position	Height (m)	Birth date
1	(Brazil) Milka Silva	Middle Blocker	1.90	July 18, 1994 (age 31)
2	(Brazil) Natália Araujo	Libero	1.65	April 10, 1997 (age 28)
3	(Brazil) Danielle Lins	Setter	1.83	January 5, 1985 (age 40)
4	(Brazil) Maira Claro	Outside Hitter	1.87	March 7, 1995 (age 30)
5	(Brazil) Jackeline Santos	Setter	1.74	December 30, 1999 (age 25)
6	(Brazil) Thaísa Menezes	Middle Blocker	1.96	May 15, 1987 (age 38)
7	(Brazil) Lays Freitas	Middle Blocker	1.85	October 13, 1995 (age 30)
8	(Brazil) Jheovana Sebastião	Opposite	1.94	January 10, 2001 (age 24)
9	(Brazil) Vivian Pellegrino	Middle Blocker	1.81	May 31, 1985 (age 40)
10	(Brazil) Tainara Santos	Outside Hitter	1.87	March 9, 2000 (age 25)
13	(Brazil) Amanda Francisco	Outside Hitter	1.80	August 16, 1988 (age 37)
14	(Brazil) Sara Silva	Opposite	1.85	April 29, 1994 (age 31)
16	(Brazil) Juma Silva	Setter	1.81	January 17, 1993 (age 32)
17	(Poland) Katarzyna Skowronska	Opposite	1.89	June 30, 1986 (age 39)
19	(Argentina) Elina Rodriguez	Outside Hitter	1.89	February 11, 1997 (age 28)

Team roster - season 2017–2018
Number	Player	Position	Height (m)	Birth date
1	(Brazil) Natália Araujo	Libero	1.65	April 10, 1997 (age 28)
2	(Brazil) Daniela Guimarães	Libero	1.66	July 29, 1994 (age 31)
3	(Brazil) Erika Coimbra	Outside Hitter	1.80	March 23, 1980 (age 45)
4	(Brazil) Edinara Brancher	Opposite	1.86	February 1, 1996 (age 29)
6	(Brazil) Ana Cristina Porto	Setter	1.73	October 1, 1982 (age 43)
7	(Brazil) Saraelen Lima	Middle Blocker	1.84	April 16, 1994 (age 31)
8	(Brazil) Jaqueline Carvalho	Outside Hitter	1.86	December 31, 1983 (age 41)
9	(Brazil) Suelle Oliveira	Outside hitter	1.87	April 29, 1987 (age 38)
10	(Brazil) Tainara Santos	Outside Hitter	1.90	March 9, 2000 (age 25)
11	(United States) Carli Lloyd	Setter	1.80	August 6, 1989 (age 36)
12	(Brazil) Naiane Rios	Setter	1.80	November 29, 1994 (age 31)
13	(Brazil) Francynne Jacintho	Middle Blocker	1.90	July 16, 1992 (age 33)
14	(Brazil) Sara Silva	Opposite	1.85	April 29, 1994 (age 31)
15	(Brazil) Fernanda Isis da Silva	Middle Blocker	1.87	July 15, 1984 (age 41)
16	(Brazil) Thaísa Menezes	Middle Blocker	1.96	May 15, 1987 (age 38)
17	(Poland) Katarzyna Skowronska	Opposite	1.89	June 30, 1986 (age 39)
18	(Brazil) Ariele Ferreira	Outside Hitter	1.85	November 18, 1995 (age 30)
19	(Brazil) Francine Tomazine	Setter	1.81	November 5, 1991 (age 34)

== Titles ==
- Paulista Championship:
  - Runners-Up (1): 2017
