= Juma da Silva =

Brazilian volleyball player (born 1993)

Juma Silva
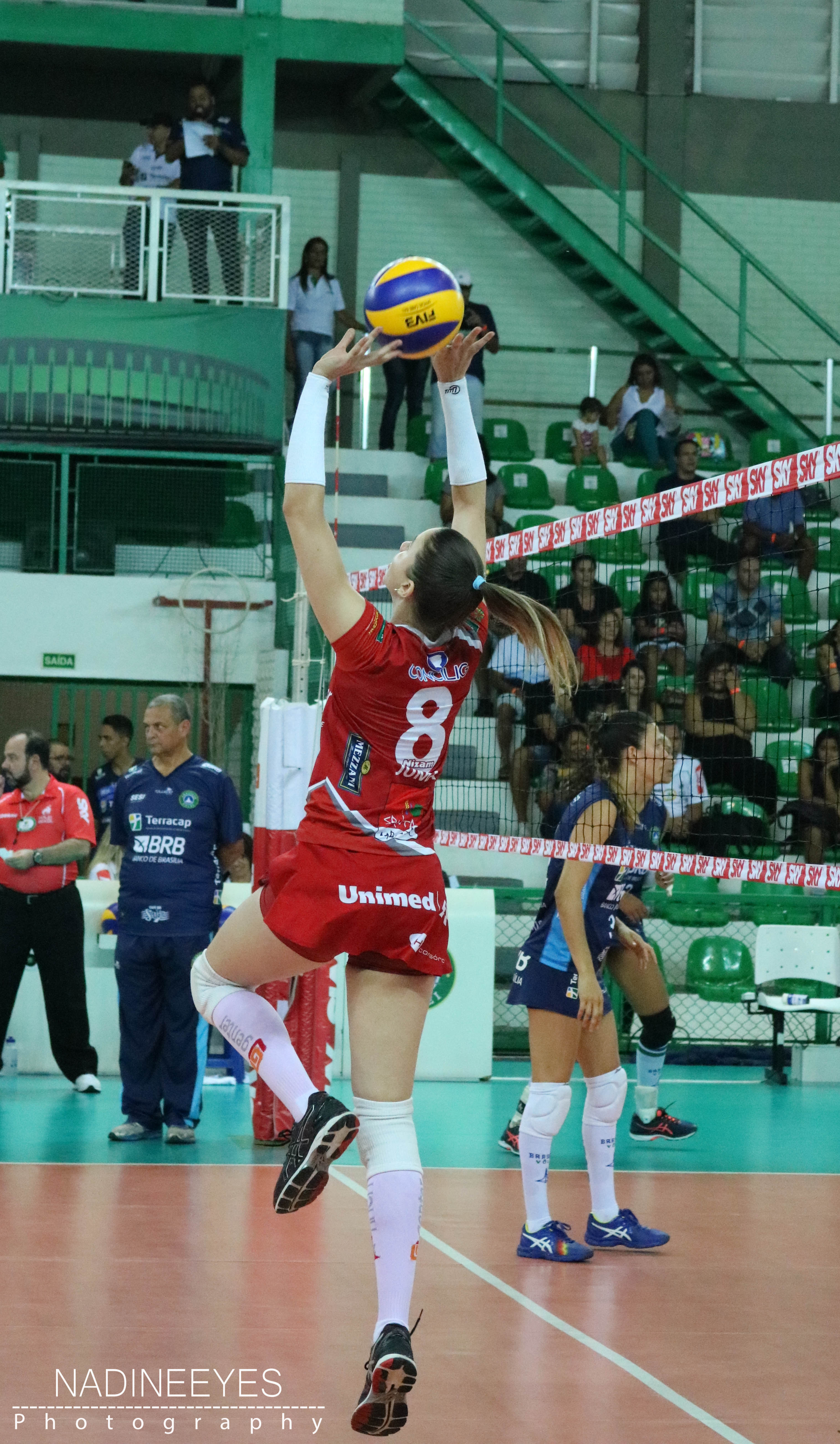
- Juma Silva in 2017

Personal information
- Full name: Juma Fernandes da Silva
- Nationality: Brazilian
- Born: 17 January 1993 (age 33); Belém, Pará
- Height: 1.81 m (5 ft 11 in)
- Weight: 68 kg (150 lb)
- Spike: 295 cm (116 in)
- Block: 280 cm (110 in)

Volleyball information
- Position: Setter
- Current club: Sesc Flamengo
- Number: 5

National team
2014–2015	Brazil U-23
Honours
Women's volleyball
Representing Brazil
FIVB U23 World Championship
Gold medal – first place	2015 Ankara	Team

Juma Fernandes da Silva (born 17 January 1993) is a Brazilian volleyball player as a setter.

== Career ==
She competed at the 2015 FIVB U23 World Championship, 2016 Montreux Volley Masters, and 2018 FIVB Volleyball Women's Nations League.

== Clubs ==
- (Brazil) Barueri (2013–2014)
- (Brazil) São Caetano (2014–2015)
- (Brazil) Pinheiros (2015–2016)
- (Brazil) Genter Bauru (2016–2018)
- (Brazil) Barueri (2018–2020)
- (Brazil) SESC Rio (2020–)

== Awards ==
=== Individuals ===
- 2014 U22 South American Championship – "Best Setter"
- 2015 FIVB U23 World Championship – "Best Setter"
- 2015 FIVB U23 World Championship – "Most Valuable Player"
