= Milka Silva =

Brazilian volleyball player (born 1994)

Personal information
- Full name: Milka Marcília Medeiros Silva
- Born: 18 July 1994 (age 32); Gameleira, Bahia, Brazil
- Height: 1.90 m (6 ft 3 in)
- Weight: 75 kg (165 lb)
- Spike: 307 cm (121 in)
- Block: 291 cm (115 in)

Volleyball information
- Position: Middle blocker
- Current club: Sesc-RJ
- Number: 1

National team
2019–	Brazil
Honours
Women's volleyball
Representing Brazil
FIVB U23 World Championship
Gold medal – first place	2015 Ankara

Milka Marcília Medeiros Silva (born 18 July 1994) is a Brazilian indoor volleyball player. She is a current member of the Brazil women's national volleyball team.

== Career ==
She participated at the 2013 FIVB U20 World Championship, 2015 FIVB U23 World Championship, and 2019 FIVB Nations League.

== Clubs ==
- (Brazil) Osasco/Audax (2012–2013)
- (Brazil) São Caetano (2013–2015)
- (Brazil) São Bernado Vôlei (2015–2016)
- (Brazil) EC Pinheiros (2016–2018)
- (Brazil) Hinode Barueri (2018–2019)
- (Brazil) SESC-RJ (2019–)

== Personal life ==
Milka is openly lesbian and is married with the Argentine volleyball player Emilce Sosa.
