= 2015 FIVB Volleyball Women's U23 World Championship =

Volleyball competition held in Turkey

2015 Women's U23 World Championship
Tournament details
- Host country: Turkey
- Dates: 12 – 19 August 2015
- Teams: 12
- Venues: 2 (in 1 host city)

Final positions
- Champions: Brazil (1st title)

Tournament awards
- MVP: Juma Silva (BRA)

The 2015 FIVB Volleyball Women's U23 World Championship was held in Ankara, Turkey, from 12 to 19 August 2015. This was the second edition of the tournament.

== Competition formula ==
The competition format will see the 12 teams split into two pools of six teams playing in round robin format. The semifinals will feature the top two teams from each pool.

== Qualification ==
The FIVB Sports Events Council confirmed a proposal to streamline the number of teams participating in the Age Group World Championships on 14 December 2013.

Method of Qualification	Date	Venue	Vacancies	Qualified
Host Country	11 November 2014	(Switzerland) Lausanne	1	Turkey
2014 African U23 Championship	7 – 9 September 2014	(Algeria) Algiers	1	Egypt
2014 U22 South American Championship	7 – 13 September 2014	(Colombia) Popayán	2	Brazil
2014 U22 South American Championship	7 – 13 September 2014	(Colombia) Popayán	2	Colombia
U19 European Rankings	18 September 2014	Luxembourg	2	Bulgaria
U19 European Rankings	18 September 2014	Luxembourg	2	Italy
2014 U23 Pan-American Cup	5 – 10 October 2014	(Peru) Ica	2	Dominican Republic
2014 U23 Pan-American Cup	5 – 10 October 2014	(Peru) Ica	2	Cuba
2015 U23 Asian Championship	1 – 9 May 2015	(Philippines) Pasig	2	China
2015 U23 Asian Championship	1 – 9 May 2015	(Philippines) Pasig	2	Thailand
U20 World Ranking	as of 1 January 2015	(Switzerland) Lausanne	2	Japan
U20 World Ranking	as of 1 January 2015	(Switzerland) Lausanne	2	Peru
Total			12	

== Pools composition ==
The pool composition was drawn by Serpentine system based on U20 World ranking. Number in the bracket denote the World ranking except the host who ranked 4th.

Pool A	Pool B
Turkey (host)	China (1)
Brazil (3)	Japan (2)
Italy (5)	Dominican Republic (8)
Bulgaria (10)	Peru (9)
Colombia (15)	Cuba (16)
Egypt (24)	Thailand (18)

== Venues ==
Pool A	Pool B
Ankara, Turkey
Ankara Arena	Başkent Volleyball Hall
Capacity: 10,400	Capacity: 7,600

== Pool standing procedure ==
1. Number of matches won
2. Match points
3. Sets ratio
4. Points ratio
5. Result of the last match between the tied teams

Match won 3–0 or 3–1: 3 match points for the winner, 0 match points for the loser
Match won 3–2: 2 match points for the winner, 1 match point for the loser

== Preliminary round ==
- All times are Eastern European Summer Time (UTC+03:00).

=== Pool A ===
Pos	Team	Pld	W	L	Pts	SW	SL	SR	SPW	SPL	SPR	Qualification
1	Turkey	5	5	0	14	15	3	5.000	429	318	1.349	Semifinals
2	Brazil	5	4	1	12	12	4	3.000	373	300	1.243	Semifinals
3	Italy	5	3	2	8	11	8	1.375	432	417	1.036	5th to 8th Classification
4	Bulgaria	5	2	3	7	8	9	0.889	370	378	0.979	5th to 8th Classification
5	Colombia	5	1	4	3	3	12	0.250	306	363	0.843	
6	Egypt	5	0	5	1	2	15	0.133	276	410	0.673	

Date	Time		Score		Set 1	Set 2	Set 3	Set 4	Set 5	Total	Report
12 Aug	14:00	Brazil	3–0	Colombia	25–15	25–15	25–18			75–48	P2 P3
12 Aug	16:30	Italy	3–0	Bulgaria	25–23	25–20	25–19			75–62	P2 P3
12 Aug	19:00	Turkey	3–0	Egypt	25–10	25–17	25–13			75–40	P2 P3
13 Aug	14:00	Bulgaria	3–0	Colombia	25–22	25–17	30–28			80–67	P2 P3
13 Aug	16:30	Brazil	3–0	Egypt	25–6	25–15	25–11			75–32	P2 P3
13 Aug	19:00	Turkey	3–1	Italy	25–15	22–25	25–18	25–22		97–80	P2 P3
14 Aug	14:00	Italy	3–0	Colombia	25–19	26–24	25–21			76–64	P2 P3
14 Aug	16:30	Bulgaria	3–0	Egypt	25–16	25–18	25–15			75–49	P2 P3
14 Aug	19:00	Turkey	3–0	Brazil	25–18	25–15	25–14			75–47	P2 P3
15 Aug	14:00	Colombia	3–0	Egypt	25–14	25–19	26–24			76–57	P2 P3
15 Aug	16:30	Brazil	3–1	Italy	30–28	16–25	25–19	25–20		96–92	P2 P3
15 Aug	19:00	Turkey	3–2	Bulgaria	25–20	25–22	23–25	19–25	15–8	107–100	P2 P3
17 Aug	14:00	Italy	3–2	Egypt	22–25	22–25	25–21	25–15	15–12	109–98	P2 P3
17 Aug	16:30	Brazil	3–0	Bulgaria	25–17	25–8	30–28			80–53	P2 P3
17 Aug	19:00	Turkey	3–0	Colombia	25–21	25–13	25–17			75–51	P2 P3

=== Pool B ===
Pos	Team	Pld	W	L	Pts	SW	SL	SR	SPW	SPL	SPR	Qualification
1	Dominican Republic	5	4	1	12	13	4	3.250	405	324	1.250	Semifinals
2	Japan	5	4	1	12	13	4	3.250	404	339	1.192	Semifinals
3	China	5	4	1	12	12	6	2.000	428	354	1.209	5th to 8th Classification
4	Thailand	5	2	3	6	7	10	0.700	380	402	0.945	5th to 8th Classification
5	Peru	5	1	4	3	6	12	0.500	372	407	0.914	
6	Cuba	5	0	5	0	0	15	0.000	217	380	0.571	

Date	Time		Score		Set 1	Set 2	Set 3	Set 4	Set 5	Total	Report
12 Aug	14:00	China	3–1	Thailand	25–27	25–19	25–21	25–23		100–90	P2 P3
12 Aug	16:30	Dominican Republic	3–1	Peru	25–21	25–17	23–25	25–17		98–80	P2 P3
12 Aug	19:00	Japan	3–0	Cuba	25–16	25–10	25–20			75–46	P2 P3
13 Aug	14:00	Peru	1–3	Thailand	25–21	17–25	22–25	21–25		85–96	P2 P3
13 Aug	16:30	Dominican Republic	3–0	Cuba	25–19	25–13	25–9			75–41	P2 P3
13 Aug	19:00	China	3–1	Japan	23–25	25–16	25–22	27–25		100–88	P2 P3
14 Aug	14:00	Japan	3–0	Thailand	25–20	25–23	25–15			75–58	P2 P3
14 Aug	16:30	Peru	3–0	Cuba	25–9	25–10	25–22			75–41	P2 P3
14 Aug	19:00	China	0–3	Dominican Republic	19–25	19–25	18–25			56–75	P2 P3
15 Aug	14:00	Cuba	0–3	Thailand	17–25	28–30	22–25			67–80	P2 P3
15 Aug	16:30	China	3–1	Peru	22–25	25–20	25–18	25–16		97–79	P2 P3
15 Aug	19:00	Japan	3–1	Dominican Republic	25–20	25–18	16–25	25–19		91–82	P2 P3
17 Aug	14:00	Dominican Republic	3–0	Thailand	25–22	25–21	25–13			75–56	P2 P3
17 Aug	16:30	Japan	3–0	Peru	25–18	25–20	25–15			75–53	P2 P3
17 Aug	19:00	China	3–0	Cuba	25–6	25–8	25–8			75–22	P2 P3

== Final round ==
- All times are Eastern European Summer Time (UTC+03:00).

=== 5th–8th places ===
Semifinals
18 August
Italy	3
Thailand	0
18 August
China	3
Bulgaria	1

5th place
19 August
Italy	0
China	3
7th place
19 August
Thailand	2
Bulgaria	3

==== Classification 5th and 8th ====
Date	Time		Score		Set 1	Set 2	Set 3	Set 4	Set 5	Total	Report
18 Aug	11:00	Italy	3–0	Thailand	25–23	27–25	28–26			80–74	P2 P3
18 Aug	13:30	China	3–1	Bulgaria	22–25	25–21	25–20	25–19		97–85	P2 P3

==== Classification 7th ====
Date	Time		Score		Set 1	Set 2	Set 3	Set 4	Set 5	Total	Report
19 Aug	11:00	Thailand	2–3	Bulgaria	21–25	25–21	25–17	12–25	8–15	91–103	P2 P3

==== Classification 5th ====
Date	Time		Score		Set 1	Set 2	Set 3	Set 4	Set 5	Total	Report
19 Aug	13:30	Italy	0–3	China	21–25	20–25	25–27			66–77	P2 P3

=== Championship round ===
Semifinals
18 August
Turkey	3
Japan	1
18 August
Dominican Republic	2
Brazil	3

Final
19 August
Turkey	1
Brazil	3
Third place
19 August
Japan	2
Dominican Republic	3

==== Semifinals ====
Date	Time		Score		Set 1	Set 2	Set 3	Set 4	Set 5	Total	Report
18 Aug	16:00	Dominican Republic	2–3	Brazil	25–19	21–25	25–15	22–25	9–15	102–99	P2 P3
18 Aug	18:30	Turkey	3–1	Japan	25–20	25–12	24–26	25–22		99–80	P2 P3

==== Bronze medal match ====
Date	Time		Score		Set 1	Set 2	Set 3	Set 4	Set 5	Total	Report
19 Aug	16:00	Japan	2–3	Dominican Republic	25–21	25–17	21–25	16–25	11–15	98–103	P2 P3

==== Gold medal match ====
Date	Time		Score		Set 1	Set 2	Set 3	Set 4	Set 5	Total	Report
19 Aug	18:30	Turkey	1–3	Brazil	21–25	25–21	19–25	22–25		87–96	P2 P3

== Final standing ==
Rank	Team
1st place, gold medalist(s)	Brazil
2nd place, silver medalist(s)	Turkey
3rd place, bronze medalist(s)	Dominican Republic
4	Japan
5	China
6	Italy
7	Bulgaria
8	Thailand
9	Peru
9	Colombia
11	Cuba
11	Egypt

2015 Women's U23 World champions

Brazil
1st title

12–woman roster
Milka Silva, Naiane Rios, Juma Silva, Saraelen Lima, Ana Paula Borgo, Rosamaria Montibeller (c), Valquiria Dullius, Gabriella Souza, Juliana Fillipelli, Drussyla Costa, Kasiely Clemente, Lorenne Teixeira
Head coach
Wagner Coppini Fernandes

== Awards ==
- Most valuable player
  - (Brazil) Juma Silva
- Best setter
  - (Brazil) Juma Silva
- Best Outside Spikers
  - (Dominican Republic) Brayelin Martinez
  - (Japan) Arisa Inoue
- Best middle blocker
  - (Turkey) Kübra Akman
  - (Italy) Sara Bonifacio
- Best opposite spiker
  - (Brazil) Rosamaria Montibeller
- Best libero
  - (Turkey) Gizem Örge

== See also ==
- 2015 FIVB Volleyball Men's U23 World Championship
