= 2017 FIVB Volleyball Women's U23 World Championship squads =

This article shows the rosters of all participating teams at the Women's U23 World Championship 2017 in Ljubljana, Slovenia.

== Pool A ==
=== Slovenia ===
The following is the Slovenian roster in the 2017 FIVB Women's U23 World Championship.

Head coach: Alessandro Chiappini

No.	Name	Date of birth	Height	Weight	Spike	Block	2016–2017 club
1	Eva Mori (c)	13 March 1996	1.86 m (6 ft 1 in)	67 kg (148 lb)	305 cm (120 in)	275 cm (108 in)	(France) Beziers
2	Darja Erzen	20 June 1997	1.89 m (6 ft 2 in)	72 kg (159 lb)	299 cm (118 in)	271 cm (107 in)	(Slovenia) OK Formis
4	Ana Marija Vovk	29 March 1998	1.85 m (6 ft 1 in)	70 kg (150 lb)	298 cm (117 in)	269 cm (106 in)	(Slovenia) OK Nova KBM Branik
5	Pia Blazic	25 July 1998	1.80 m (5 ft 11 in)	67 kg (148 lb)	294 cm (116 in)	264 cm (104 in)	(Slovenia) Calcit Ljubljana
6	Maja Pahor	23 December 1996	1.66 m (5 ft 5 in)	62 kg (137 lb)	268 cm (106 in)	253 cm (100 in)	(Slovenia) Calcit Ljubljana
9	Iza Mlaker	14 November 1995	1.84 m (6 ft 0 in)	66 kg (146 lb)	300 cm (120 in)	272 cm (107 in)	(Slovenia) OK Nova KBM Branik
14	Lana Šcuka	6 October 1996	1.85 m (6 ft 1 in)	72 kg (159 lb)	304 cm (120 in)	283 cm (111 in)	(Italy) Filottrano Pallavolo
15	Ela Pintar	11 January 1996	1.82 m (6 ft 0 in)	58 kg (128 lb)	293 cm (115 in)	268 cm (106 in)	(Slovenia) OK Nova KBM Branik
17	Spela Marusic	1 August 1999	1.75 m (5 ft 9 in)	55 kg (121 lb)	280 cm (110 in)	254 cm (100 in)	(Slovenia) OK Gorica
18	Saša Planinšec	2 June 1995	1.82 m (6 ft 0 in)	70 kg (150 lb)	300 cm (120 in)	279 cm (110 in)	(Slovenia) OK Nova KBM Branik
20	Anita Sobocan	26 May 1997	1.77 m (5 ft 10 in)	58 kg (128 lb)	280 cm (110 in)	265 cm (104 in)	(Slovenia) OK Nova KBM Branik
21	Tina Grudina	3 December 1995	1.82 m (6 ft 0 in)	67 kg (148 lb)	300 cm (120 in)	270 cm (110 in)	(Slovenia) Calcit Ljubljana

=== Dominican Republic ===
The following is the Dominican roster in the 2017 FIVB Women's U23 World Championship.

Head coach: Wagner Pacheco

No.	Name	Date of birth	Height	Weight	Spike	Block	2016–2017 club
1	Yanlis Féliz	3 June 2000	1.81 m (5 ft 11 in)	69 kg (152 lb)	282 cm (111 in)	263 cm (104 in)	(Dominican Republic) Pedernales
2	Winifer Fernández	6 January 1995	1.69 m (5 ft 7 in)	62 kg (137 lb)	270 cm (110 in)	265 cm (104 in)	(Dominican Republic) Cien Fuego
4	Vielka Peralta	13 April 1999	1.76 m (5 ft 9 in)	56 kg (123 lb)	275 cm (108 in)	242 cm (95 in)	(Dominican Republic) Deportivo Nacional
7	Camila de la Rosa	2 July 2001	1.78 m (5 ft 10 in)	73 kg (161 lb)	273 cm (107 in)	260 cm (100 in)	(Dominican Republic) Deportivo Nacional
8	Natalia Martínez	25 November 2000	1.86 m (6 ft 1 in)	71 kg (157 lb)	300 cm (120 in)	275 cm (108 in)	(Dominican Republic) Mirador
9	Angélica Hinojosa	10 January 1997	1.86 m (6 ft 1 in)	72 kg (159 lb)	305 cm (120 in)	279 cm (110 in)	(Dominican Republic) Cien Fuego
10	Larysmer Martínez	18 October 1996	1.74 m (5 ft 9 in)	68 kg (150 lb)	288 cm (113 in)	258 cm (102 in)	(Dominican Republic) Deportivo Nacional
11	Geraldine González	18 April 2002	1.93 m (6 ft 4 in)	64 kg (141 lb)	273 cm (107 in)	245 cm (96 in)	(Dominican Republic) Deportivo Nacional
12	Madeline Guillén	4 June 2001	1.86 m (6 ft 1 in)	74 kg (163 lb)	273 cm (107 in)	242 cm (95 in)	(Dominican Republic) Malanga
15	Yokaty Pérez (c)	6 August 1998	1.78 m (5 ft 10 in)	79 kg (174 lb)	291 cm (115 in)	257 cm (101 in)	(Dominican Republic) Los Cachorros
21	Jineiry Martínez	3 December 1997	1.90 m (6 ft 3 in)	68 kg (150 lb)	305 cm (120 in)	280 cm (110 in)	(Dominican Republic) Mirador
22	Gaila González	25 June 1997	1.88 m (6 ft 2 in)	73 kg (161 lb)	304 cm (120 in)	276 cm (109 in)	(Dominican Republic) Mirador

=== China ===
The following is the Chinese roster in the 2017 FIVB Women's U23 World Championship.

Head coach: Wu Sheng

No.	Name	Date of birth	Height	Weight	Spike	Block	2016–2017 club
2	Gong Meizi	17 April 1995	1.75 m (5 ft 9 in)	75 kg (165 lb)	280 cm (110 in)	270 cm (110 in)	(China) Liaoning
4	Yan Kailun	17 July 1995	1.92 m (6 ft 4 in)	70 kg (150 lb)	315 cm (124 in)	310 cm (120 in)	(China) Bayi
6	Cai Xiaoqing	5 April 1998	1.79 m (5 ft 10 in)	71 kg (157 lb)	305 cm (120 in)	295 cm (116 in)	(China) Henan
7	Huang Ruilei	8 May 1996	1.96 m (6 ft 5 in)	81 kg (179 lb)	303 cm (119 in)	296 cm (117 in)	(China) Henan
9	Jin Ye	1 March 1996	1.87 m (6 ft 2 in)	77 kg (170 lb)	310 cm (120 in)	302 cm (119 in)	(China) Beijing
10	Zhu Yuezhou	27 March 1995	1.85 m (6 ft 1 in)	72 kg (159 lb)	301 cm (119 in)	296 cm (117 in)	(China) Zhejiang
14	Song Meili	23 February 1995	1.86 m (6 ft 1 in)	75 kg (165 lb)	310 cm (120 in)	300 cm (120 in)	(China) Shandong
16	Chen Peiyan	16 September 1999	1.93 m (6 ft 4 in)	79 kg (174 lb)	318 cm (125 in)	309 cm (122 in)	(China) Guangdong
17	Yu Jiarui	23 October 1997	1.80 m (5 ft 11 in)	74 kg (163 lb)	295 cm (116 in)	290 cm (110 in)	(China) Guangdong
18	Cheng Long (c)	10 January 1995	1.85 m (6 ft 1 in)	75 kg (165 lb)	305 cm (120 in)	295 cm (116 in)	(China) Shandong
19	Lei Yanxi	20 January 1995	1.86 m (6 ft 1 in)	70 kg (150 lb)	310 cm (120 in)	305 cm (120 in)	(China) Yunnan
20	Wang Yunlu	20 May 1995	1.92 m (6 ft 4 in)	82 kg (181 lb)	310 cm (120 in)	301 cm (119 in)	(China) Bayi

=== Thailand ===
The following is the Thai roster in the 2017 FIVB Women's U23 World Championship.

Head coach: Chamnan Dokmai

No.	Name	Date of birth	Height	Weight	Spike	Block	2016–2017 club
1	Anisa Yotpinit	23 June 1998	1.62 m (5 ft 4 in)	58 kg (128 lb)	245 cm (96 in)	265 cm (104 in)	(Thailand) King-Bangkok
2	Chutimon Sagon	2 October 1998	1.69 m (5 ft 7 in)	53 kg (117 lb)	269 cm (106 in)	253 cm (100 in)	(Thailand) King-Bangkok
3	Wipawee Srithong	28 January 1999	1.74 m (5 ft 9 in)	65 kg (143 lb)	288 cm (113 in)	266 cm (105 in)	(Thailand) Supreme Chonburi
4	Hathairat Jarat	9 February 1996	1.83 m (6 ft 0 in)	65 kg (143 lb)	286 cm (113 in)	277 cm (109 in)	(Thailand) Thai-Denmark Nongrua
5	Tichakorn Boonlert	22 March 2001	1.80 m (5 ft 11 in)	78 kg (172 lb)	294 cm (116 in)	283 cm (111 in)	(Thailand) 3BB Nakornnont
7	Patcharaporn Sittisad	20 February 1996	1.65 m (5 ft 5 in)	52 kg (115 lb)	278 cm (109 in)	263 cm (104 in)	(Thailand) Supreme Chonburi
9	Usa Daowern	26 January 2000	1.80 m (5 ft 11 in)	72 kg (159 lb)	304 cm (120 in)	285 cm (112 in)	(Thailand) Thai-Denmark Nongrua
10	Thanacha Sooksod	26 May 2000	1.80 m (5 ft 11 in)	70 kg (150 lb)	283 cm (111 in)	275 cm (108 in)	(Thailand) Supreme Chonburi
11	Watchareeya Nuanjam	22 July 1996	1.78 m (5 ft 10 in)	64 kg (141 lb)	292 cm (115 in)	279 cm (110 in)	(Thailand) Supreme Chonburi
13	Natthanicha Jaisaen	21 May 1998	1.71 m (5 ft 7 in)	55 kg (121 lb)	283 cm (111 in)	276 cm (109 in)	(Thailand) 3BB Nakornnont
16	Parinya Pankaew	27 December 1995	1.70 m (5 ft 7 in)	59 kg (130 lb)	281 cm (111 in)	269 cm (106 in)	(Thailand) Supreme Chonburi
17	Tichaya Boonlert (c)	14 February 1997	1.79 m (5 ft 10 in)	64 kg (141 lb)	293 cm (115 in)	284 cm (112 in)	(Thailand) 3BB Nakornnont

=== Egypt ===
The following is the Egyptian roster in the 2017 FIVB Women's U23 World Championship.

Head coach: Maged Mohamed

No.	Name	Date of birth	Height	Weight	Spike	Block	2016–2017 club
1	Aya Elshamy	27 November 1995	1.86 m (6 ft 1 in)	77 kg (170 lb)	297 cm (117 in)	279 cm (110 in)	(Egypt) Al Ahly SC
7	Mariam Ahmed	5 September 1995	1.68 m (5 ft 6 in)	57 kg (126 lb)	262 cm (103 in)	255 cm (100 in)	(Egypt) Al Ahly SC
10	Doaa Abdelghany	21 June 1996	1.85 m (6 ft 1 in)	70 kg (150 lb)	289 cm (114 in)	273 cm (107 in)	(Egypt) Zamalek SC
11	Mariam Ebrahim	13 March 1997	1.67 m (5 ft 6 in)	63 kg (139 lb)	273 cm (107 in)	261 cm (103 in)	(Egypt) El Shams Club
12	Farida El Askalany (c)	14 February 1995	1.86 m (6 ft 1 in)	65 kg (143 lb)	278 cm (109 in)	264 cm (104 in)	(Egypt) Al Ahly SC
13	Nourallah Amin	25 November 2000	1.84 m (6 ft 0 in)	70 kg (150 lb)	285 cm (112 in)	276 cm (109 in)	(Egypt) Al Ahly SC
14	Rahma Almohandes	9 November 1996	1.75 m (5 ft 9 in)	63 kg (139 lb)	277 cm (109 in)	265 cm (104 in)	(Egypt) Al Ahly SC
15	Doaa Elghobashy	8 November 1996	1.80 m (5 ft 11 in)	74 kg (163 lb)	285 cm (112 in)	275 cm (108 in)	(Egypt) Wady Degla
16	Lina Abdou	6 November 1996	1.73 m (5 ft 8 in)	65 kg (143 lb)	282 cm (111 in)	262 cm (103 in)	(Egypt) Alexandria Sporting Club
17	Aya Ahmed	27 April 1996	1.83 m (6 ft 0 in)	68 kg (150 lb)	270 cm (110 in)	262 cm (103 in)	(Egypt) El Shams SC
18	Alaa Badawy	13 February 1996	1.74 m (5 ft 9 in)	70 kg (150 lb)	188 cm (74 in)	176 cm (69 in)	(Egypt) Smouha SC
20	Sarah Hanafy	15 April 1997	1.78 m (5 ft 10 in)	73 kg (161 lb)	265 cm (104 in)	255 cm (100 in)	(Egypt) El Shams Club

=== Argentina ===
The following is the Argentine roster in the 2017 FIVB Women's U23 World Championship.

Head coach: Martín López

No.	Name	Date of birth	Height	Weight	Spike	Block	2016–2017 club
2	Barbara Frangella	17 February 1996	1.79 m (5 ft 10 in)	68 kg (150 lb)	289 cm (114 in)	280 cm (110 in)	(Argentina) Boca Juniors
3	Mariana Moriondo	2 December 1995	1.73 m (5 ft 8 in)	69 kg (152 lb)	268 cm (106 in)	260 cm (100 in)	(Argentina) San Lorenzo de Almagro
4	Martina Guastavino	18 July 1995	1.80 m (5 ft 11 in)	70 kg (150 lb)	285 cm (112 in)	275 cm (108 in)	(Argentina) River Plate
5	Agnes Victoria Tosi	1 July 1999	1.82 m (6 ft 0 in)	69 kg (152 lb)	283 cm (111 in)	273 cm (107 in)	(Argentina) Echaque - Parana
7	Azul Benitez	5 February 1998	1.65 m (5 ft 5 in)	60 kg (130 lb)	260 cm (100 in)	245 cm (96 in)	(Argentina) Mar Chiquita
8	Sol Piccolo	11 September 1996	1.84 m (6 ft 0 in)	74 kg (163 lb)	294 cm (116 in)	282 cm (111 in)	(Argentina) Vélez Sarsfield
10	Anahi Florencia Tosi	10 July 1998	1.81 m (5 ft 11 in)	60 kg (130 lb)	290 cm (110 in)	272 cm (107 in)	(Argentina) 9 de Julio - Freyre
12	Irene Verasio	14 July 1996	1.78 m (5 ft 10 in)	59 kg (130 lb)	283 cm (111 in)	271 cm (107 in)	(Argentina) Sonder Volley
15	Antonela Fortuna (c)	10 May 1995	1.75 m (5 ft 9 in)	61 kg (134 lb)	285 cm (112 in)	275 cm (108 in)	(Argentina) San Lorenzo de Almagro
17	Micaela Esperon	2 April 1995	1.70 m (5 ft 7 in)	58 kg (128 lb)	255 cm (100 in)	245 cm (96 in)	(Argentina) Atlético Vélez Sarsfield
22	Camila Hiruela Tapia	1 February 1997	1.76 m (5 ft 9 in)	77 kg (170 lb)	287 cm (113 in)	280 cm (110 in)	(Argentina) River Plate
23	Daniela Bulaich Simian	5 September 1997	1.72 m (5 ft 8 in)	53 kg (117 lb)	274 cm (108 in)	263 cm (104 in)	(Argentina) Boca Juniors

== Pool B ==
=== Brazil ===
The following is the Brazilian roster in the 2017 FIVB Women's U23 World Championship.

Head coach: Wagner Fernandes

No.	Name	Date of birth	Height	Weight	Spike	Block	2016–2017 club
1	Drussyla Costa (c)	1 July 1996	1.82 m (6 ft 0 in)	73 kg (161 lb)	304 cm (120 in)	286 cm (113 in)	(Brazil) Rexona-Ades
2	Bruna Costa	30 January 1995	1.70 m (5 ft 7 in)	65 kg (143 lb)	276 cm (109 in)	275 cm (108 in)	(Brazil) E.C. Pinheiros
4	Maira Claro	7 March 1995	1.87 m (6 ft 2 in)	62 kg (137 lb)	300 cm (120 in)	278 cm (109 in)	(Brazil) E.C. Pinheiros
6	Gabriela Candido	22 May 1996	1.81 m (5 ft 11 in)	75 kg (165 lb)	296 cm (117 in)	285 cm (112 in)	(Brazil) Rexona-Ades
7	Lays Freitas	13 October 1995	1.85 m (6 ft 1 in)	77 kg (170 lb)	292 cm (115 in)	281 cm (111 in)	(Brazil) E.C. Pinheiros
9	Lyara Medeiros	19 September 1996	1.84 m (6 ft 0 in)	67 kg (148 lb)	297 cm (117 in)	285 cm (112 in)	(Brazil) Bradesco
10	Ingrid Rizzatti	5 June 1997	1.87 m (6 ft 2 in)	65 kg (143 lb)	295 cm (116 in)	280 cm (110 in)	(Brazil) Bradesco
11	Lorenne Teixeira	1 August 1996	1.85 m (6 ft 1 in)	73 kg (161 lb)	295 cm (116 in)	283 cm (111 in)	(Brazil) SESI São Paulo
14	Edinara Brancher	1 February 1996	1.86 m (6 ft 1 in)	80 kg (180 lb)	295 cm (116 in)	285 cm (112 in)	(Brazil) São Caetano
16	Natália Araujo	10 April 1997	1.62 m (5 ft 4 in)	59 kg (130 lb)	228 cm (90 in)	215 cm (85 in)	(Brazil) SESI São Paulo
18	Mayany de Souza	24 November 1996	1.85 m (6 ft 1 in)	62 kg (137 lb)	293 cm (115 in)	282 cm (111 in)	(Brazil) Camponesa Minas
20	Talia Costa	10 July 1997	1.78 m (5 ft 10 in)	64 kg (141 lb)	290 cm (110 in)	281 cm (111 in)	(Brazil) Chapecó

=== Turkey ===
The following is the Turkish roster in the 2017 FIVB Women's U23 World Championship.

Head coach: Ataman Guneyligil

No.	Name	Date of birth	Height	Weight	Spike	Block	2016–2017 club
2	Tuğba Senoğlu	2 February 1998	1.84 m (6 ft 0 in)	64 kg (141 lb)	275 cm (108 in)	270 cm (110 in)	(Turkey) Beşiktaş
4	Beyza Arici	27 July 1995	1.92 m (6 ft 4 in)	82 kg (181 lb)	302 cm (119 in)	293 cm (115 in)	(Turkey) Eczacıbaşı VitrA
5	Ayça Aykaç	27 February 1996	1.76 m (5 ft 9 in)	54 kg (119 lb)	280 cm (110 in)	279 cm (110 in)	(Turkey) VakıfBank
7	Çağla Akın (c)	19 January 1995	1.77 m (5 ft 10 in)	70 kg (150 lb)	300 cm (120 in)	280 cm (110 in)	(Turkey) Beşiktaş
9	Asli Kalac	13 December 1995	1.83 m (6 ft 0 in)	73 kg (161 lb)	310 cm (120 in)	300 cm (120 in)	(Turkey) Galatasaray Daikin
10	Ezgi Dilik	12 June 1995	1.70 m (5 ft 7 in)	60 kg (130 lb)	282 cm (111 in)	287 cm (113 in)	(Turkey) Fenerbahçe
12	Bihter Dumanoğlu	3 February 1995	1.70 m (5 ft 7 in)	70 kg (150 lb)	279 cm (110 in)	275 cm (108 in)	(Turkey) Galatasaray Daikin
15	Hande Baladin	1 September 1997	1.89 m (6 ft 2 in)	71 kg (157 lb)	310 cm (120 in)	300 cm (120 in)	(Turkey) Eczacıbaşı VitrA
16	Saliha Şahin	5 November 1998	1.85 m (6 ft 1 in)	62 kg (137 lb)	282 cm (111 in)	275 cm (108 in)	(Turkey) Karayolları
17	Nursevil Aydinlar	28 November 1995	1.87 m (6 ft 2 in)	64 kg (141 lb)	293 cm (115 in)	285 cm (112 in)	(Turkey) Galatasaray Daikin
18	Zehra Güneş	7 July 1999	1.94 m (6 ft 4 in)	82 kg (181 lb)	309 cm (122 in)	255 cm (100 in)	(Turkey) Beşiktaş
19	Ebrar Karakurt	17 January 2000	1.94 m (6 ft 4 in)	72 kg (159 lb)	307 cm (121 in)	305 cm (120 in)	(Turkey) VakıfBank

=== Japan ===
The following is the Japanese roster in the 2017 FIVB Women's U23 World Championship.

Head coach: Kiyoshi Abo

No.	Name	Date of birth	Height	Weight	Spike	Block	2016–2017 club
1	Misaki Yamauchi (c)	10 March 1995	1.72 m (5 ft 8 in)	69 kg (152 lb)	306 cm (120 in)	295 cm (116 in)	(Japan) NEC Red rockets
2	Nozomi Itoh	16 February 1995	1.78 m (5 ft 10 in)	70 kg (150 lb)	306 cm (120 in)	295 cm (116 in)	(Japan) Toray Arrow
3	Ayaka Sugi	12 April 1996	1.77 m (5 ft 10 in)	72 kg (159 lb)	293 cm (115 in)	282 cm (111 in)	(Japan) Tokyo Women's College
5	Haruka Kanamori	9 April 1996	1.76 m (5 ft 9 in)	66 kg (146 lb)	297 cm (117 in)	285 cm (112 in)	(Japan) Hisamitsu Springs
6	Misaki Shirai	30 July 1996	1.75 m (5 ft 9 in)	71 kg (157 lb)	293 cm (115 in)	280 cm (110 in)	(Japan) Toray Arrow
7	Nanaka Sakamoto	6 September 1996	1.76 m (5 ft 9 in)	65 kg (143 lb)	304 cm (120 in)	294 cm (116 in)	(Japan) Denso Airybees
8	Miki Sakurai	1 May 1996	1.69 m (5 ft 7 in)	62 kg (137 lb)	275 cm (108 in)	265 cm (104 in)	(Japan) Nippon Sport Science University
10	Kaori Mabashi	18 November 1996	1.73 m (5 ft 8 in)	63 kg (139 lb)	295 cm (116 in)	285 cm (112 in)	(Japan) Hitachi Rivale
11	Nanami Hirose	12 May 1997	1.77 m (5 ft 10 in)	61 kg (134 lb)	301 cm (119 in)	295 cm (116 in)	(Japan) NEC Red Rockets
12	Moeri Hanai	17 April 1997	1.66 m (5 ft 5 in)	60 kg (130 lb)	275 cm (108 in)	270 cm (110 in)	(Japan) Nippon Sport Science University
13	Miwako Osanai	19 July 1997	1.74 m (5 ft 9 in)	66 kg (146 lb)	293 cm (115 in)	270 cm (110 in)	(Japan) Hitachi Rivale
16	Rei Kudo	5 December 1997	1.75 m (5 ft 9 in)	65 kg (143 lb)	300 cm (120 in)	295 cm (116 in)	(Japan) Denso Airybees

=== Bulgaria ===
The following is the Bulgarian roster in the 2017 FIVB Women's U23 World Championship.

Head coach: Antonina Zetova

No.	Name	Date of birth	Height	Weight	Spike	Block	2016–2017 club
1	Gergana Dimitrova (c)	28 February 1996	1.84 m (6 ft 0 in)	71 kg (157 lb)	305 cm (120 in)	288 cm (113 in)	(France) RC Cannes
2	Polina Neykova	7 October 1998	1.82 m (6 ft 0 in)	73 kg (161 lb)	287 cm (113 in)	280 cm (110 in)	(Bulgaria) CSKA Volley
3	Vangeliya Rachkovska	19 July 1997	1.85 m (6 ft 1 in)	67 kg (148 lb)	296 cm (117 in)	281 cm (111 in)	(Bulgaria) Maritza Volley
4	Iveta Stanchulova	11 August 1997	1.86 m (6 ft 1 in)	72 kg (159 lb)	290 cm (110 in)	285 cm (112 in)	(Bulgaria) CSKA Volley
5	Mirela Shahpazova	28 October 1997	1.75 m (5 ft 9 in)	65 kg (143 lb)	280 cm (110 in)	270 cm (110 in)	(Bulgaria) Maritza Volley
6	Miroslava Paskova	16 February 1996	1.80 m (5 ft 11 in)	67 kg (148 lb)	299 cm (118 in)	280 cm (110 in)	(Bulgaria) Rzeszów Volley
7	Monika Krasteva	9 May 1999	1.83 m (6 ft 0 in)	64 kg (141 lb)	292 cm (115 in)	285 cm (112 in)	(Bulgaria) Levski Volley
8	Ralina Doshkova	7 June 1995	1.88 m (6 ft 2 in)	64 kg (141 lb)	292 cm (115 in)	285 cm (112 in)	(Bulgaria) CSKA Volley
10	Elitsa Barakova	11 March 1997	1.84 m (6 ft 0 in)	60 kg (130 lb)	290 cm (110 in)	280 cm (110 in)	(Bulgaria) Kazanlak Volley
12	Mariya Dancheva	4 December 1995	1.95 m (6 ft 5 in)	73 kg (161 lb)	314 cm (124 in)	302 cm (119 in)	(Bulgaria) Maritza Volley
14	Silvana Chausheva	19 May 1995	1.88 m (6 ft 2 in)	75 kg (165 lb)	305 cm (120 in)	290 cm (110 in)	(Bulgaria) Maritza Volley
15	Zhana Todorova	6 January 1997	1.70 m (5 ft 7 in)	56 kg (123 lb)	271 cm (107 in)	255 cm (100 in)	(Bulgaria) Maritza Volley

=== Cuba ===
The following is the Cuban roster in the 2017 FIVB Women's U23 World Championship.

Head coach: Wilfredo Robinson

No.	Name	Date of birth	Height	Weight	Spike	Block	2016–2017 club
1	Jessica Aguilera	25 May 1999	1.84 m (6 ft 0 in)	68 kg (150 lb)	311 cm (122 in)	302 cm (119 in)	(Cuba) La Habana
5	Laura Suarez	13 December 1998	1.85 m (6 ft 1 in)	75 kg (165 lb)	304 cm (120 in)	292 cm (115 in)	(Cuba) Pinar del Rio
7	Dalila Palma	18 November 1999	1.82 m (6 ft 0 in)	62 kg (137 lb)	301 cm (119 in)	285 cm (112 in)	(Cuba) Cienfuegos
8	Diaris Perez (c)	16 November 1998	1.82 m (6 ft 0 in)	75 kg (165 lb)	304 cm (120 in)	295 cm (116 in)	(Cuba) La Habana
9	Dayessi Ruiz	23 October 1996	1.70 m (5 ft 7 in)	60 kg (130 lb)	288 cm (113 in)	248 cm (98 in)	(Cuba) Camaguey
11	Gretell Moreno	30 January 1998	1.83 m (6 ft 0 in)	68 kg (150 lb)	287 cm (113 in)	280 cm (110 in)	(Cuba) Granma
12	Ailama Cese	29 October 2000	1.88 m (6 ft 2 in)	58 kg (128 lb)	322 cm (127 in)	308 cm (121 in)	(Cuba) Mayabeque
13	Liset Herrera	6 December 1998	1.92 m (6 ft 4 in)	70 kg (150 lb)	311 cm (122 in)	300 cm (120 in)	(Cuba) Matanzas
14	Claudia Hernandez	9 January 1997	1.81 m (5 ft 11 in)	78 kg (172 lb)	225 cm (89 in)	223 cm (88 in)	(Cuba) La Habana
16	Yelennis Diaz	14 October 1995	1.89 m (6 ft 2 in)	71 kg (157 lb)	300 cm (120 in)	298 cm (117 in)	(Cuba) Villa Clara
17	Heidy Casanova	6 November 1998	1.84 m (6 ft 0 in)	78 kg (172 lb)	244 cm (96 in)	240 cm (94 in)	(Cuba) La Habana
20	Yamisleydis Viltres	26 July 2001	1.89 m (6 ft 2 in)	73 kg (161 lb)	247 cm (97 in)	244 cm (96 in)	(Cuba) Granma

=== Kenya ===
The following is the Kenyan roster in the 2017 FIVB Women's U23 World Championship.

Head coach: Catherine Mabwi

No.	Name	Date of birth	Height	Weight	Spike	Block	2016–2017 club
1	Yvone Wavinya	22 February 1996	1.75 m (5 ft 9 in)	63 kg (139 lb)	280 cm (110 in)	230 cm (91 in)	Kenya
2	Faith Imodia	19 September 1997	1.70 m (5 ft 7 in)	56 kg (123 lb)	265 cm (104 in)	275 cm (108 in)	Kenya
3	Doreen Marani	11 February 1996	1.70 m (5 ft 7 in)	70 kg (150 lb)	270 cm (110 in)	220 cm (87 in)	Kenya
5	Joan Ngeywo	5 June 1996	1.91 m (6 ft 3 in)	61 kg (134 lb)	290 cm (110 in)	248 cm (98 in)	Kenya
6	Caroline Sirengo	4 November 1997	1.79 m (5 ft 10 in)	70 kg (150 lb)	280 cm (110 in)	240 cm (94 in)	Kenya
7	Veronica Kilabat	19 March 1996	1.78 m (5 ft 10 in)	63 kg (139 lb)	275 cm (108 in)	235 cm (93 in)	Kenya
8	Edina Mwombe	5 June 1998	1.78 m (5 ft 10 in)	70 kg (150 lb)	285 cm (112 in)	235 cm (93 in)	Kenya
9	Celestine Nafula	9 July 1996	1.50 m (4 ft 11 in)	52 kg (115 lb)	255 cm (100 in)	200 cm (79 in)	Kenya
10	Anne Lowem	1 August 1996	1.80 m (5 ft 11 in)	72 kg (159 lb)	290 cm (110 in)	242 cm (95 in)	Kenya
11	Shyrine Jepkemboi (c)	13 March 1996	1.80 m (5 ft 11 in)	69 kg (152 lb)	285 cm (112 in)	240 cm (94 in)	Kenya
12	Yvon Wafula Sinaida	17 July 1997	1.85 m (6 ft 1 in)	72 kg (159 lb)	285 cm (112 in)	245 cm (96 in)	Kenya
16	Beldine Akinyi	5 May 1996	1.90 m (6 ft 3 in)	76 kg (168 lb)	285 cm (112 in)	248 cm (98 in)	Kenya

== See also ==
- 2017 FIVB Volleyball Men's U23 World Championship squads
