= Brazil women's national under-23 volleyball team =

Women's national volleyball team representing Brazil

Brazil
- Association: CBV
- Confederation: CSV

Uniforms
| Home | Away |

FIVB U23 World Championship
- Appearances: 3 (First in 2013)
- Best result: (gold) Gold : (2015)

South America U22 Championship
- Appearances: 2 (First in 2014)
- Best result: (gold) Gold Medalist : (2014, 2016)

The Brazil women's national under-23 volleyball team represents Brazil in international women's volleyball competitions and friendly matches under the age 23 and it is ruled by the Brazilian Volleyball Federation that is a member of South American volleyball body Confederación Sudamericana de Voleibol (CSV) and the international volleyball body government the Fédération Internationale de Volleyball (FIVB).

== Results ==
=== U23 World Championship ===
Champions Runners up Third place Fourth place

World Championship record
| Year | Round | Position | GP | MW | ML | SW | SL | Squad |
|---|---|---|---|---|---|---|---|---|
| (Mexico) 2013 | Preliminary round | 7th place | 7 | 4 | 3 | 15 | 11 | Squad |
| (Turkey) 2015 | Final | Champions | 7 | 6 | 1 | 18 | 8 | Squad |
| (Slovenia) 2017 | Preliminary round | 5th place | 7 | 5 | 2 | 21 | 9 | Squad |
| Total | 1 Title | 3/3 | 21 | 15 | 6 | 54 | 28 | — |

=== U22 South America Championship ===
Champions Runners up Third place Fourth place

South America Championship record
| Year | Round | Position | GP | MW | ML | SW | SL | Squad |
|---|---|---|---|---|---|---|---|---|
| (Colombia) 2014 | Final | Champions | 5 | 5 | 0 | 15 | 0 | Squad |
| (Peru) 2016 | Final | Champions | 4 | 4 | 0 | 12 | 2 | Squad |
| Total | 2 Titles | 2/2 | 9 | 9 | 0 | 27 | 2 | — |

== Team ==
=== Current squad ===
The following is the Brazilian roster in the 2017 FIVB Women's U23 World Championship.

Head coach: Wagner Fernandes

| No. | Name | Date of birth | Height | Weight | Spike | Block | 2016–2017 club |
|---|---|---|---|---|---|---|---|
| 1 | Drussyla Costa (c) | 1 July 1996 | 1.82 m (6 ft 0 in) | 73 kg (161 lb) | 304 cm (120 in) | 286 cm (113 in) | (Brazil) Rexona-Ades |
| 2 | Bruna Costa | 30 January 1995 | 1.70 m (5 ft 7 in) | 65 kg (143 lb) | 276 cm (109 in) | 275 cm (108 in) | (Brazil) E.C. Pinheiros |
| 4 | Maira Claro | 7 March 1995 | 1.87 m (6 ft 2 in) | 62 kg (137 lb) | 300 cm (120 in) | 278 cm (109 in) | (Brazil) E.C. Pinheiros |
| 6 | Gabriela Candido | 22 May 1996 | 1.81 m (5 ft 11 in) | 75 kg (165 lb) | 296 cm (117 in) | 285 cm (112 in) | (Brazil) Rexona-Ades |
| 7 | Lays Freitas | 13 October 1995 | 1.85 m (6 ft 1 in) | 77 kg (170 lb) | 292 cm (115 in) | 281 cm (111 in) | (Brazil) E.C. Pinheiros |
| 9 | Lyara Medeiros | 19 September 1996 | 1.84 m (6 ft 0 in) | 67 kg (148 lb) | 297 cm (117 in) | 285 cm (112 in) | (Brazil) Bradesco |
| 10 | Ingrid Rizzatti | 5 June 1997 | 1.87 m (6 ft 2 in) | 65 kg (143 lb) | 295 cm (116 in) | 280 cm (110 in) | (Brazil) Bradesco |
| 11 | Lorenne Teixeira | 1 August 1996 | 1.85 m (6 ft 1 in) | 73 kg (161 lb) | 295 cm (116 in) | 283 cm (111 in) | (Brazil) SESI São Paulo |
| 14 | Edinara Brancher | 1 February 1996 | 1.86 m (6 ft 1 in) | 80 kg (180 lb) | 295 cm (116 in) | 285 cm (112 in) | (Brazil) São Caetano |
| 16 | Natália Araujo | 10 April 1997 | 1.62 m (5 ft 4 in) | 59 kg (130 lb) | 228 cm (90 in) | 215 cm (85 in) | (Brazil) SESI São Paulo |
| 18 | Mayany Souza | 24 November 1996 | 1.85 m (6 ft 1 in) | 62 kg (137 lb) | 293 cm (115 in) | 282 cm (111 in) | (Brazil) Camponesa Minas |
| 20 | Talia Costa | 10 July 1997 | 1.78 m (5 ft 10 in) | 64 kg (141 lb) | 290 cm (110 in) | 281 cm (111 in) | (Brazil) Chapecó |

== Former squads ==
=== U23 World Championship ===
- 2013 – 7th place
  Ellen Braga (c), Mara Leão, Francynne Jacintho, Juliana Carrijo, Larissa Souza, Isabela Paquiardi, Priscila Heldes, Gabriella Souza, Glauciele Silva, Carla Santos, Sonaly Cidrão and Daniela Guimarães
- 2015 – Gold medal
  Milka Silva, Naiane Rios, Juma Silva, Saraelen Lima, Ana Paula da Cruz, Rosamaria Montibeller (c), Valquiria Dullius, Gabriella Souza, Juliana Fillipelli, Drussyla Costa, Kasiely Clemente and Lorenne Teixeira
- 2017 – 5th place
  Drussyla Costa (c), Bruna Costa, Maira Claro, Gabriela Candido, Lays Freitas, Lyara Medeiros, Ingrid Rizzatti, Lorenne Teixeira, Edinara Brancher, Natália Araujo, Mayany de Souza and Talia Costa

== See also ==
- Brazil men's national under-23 volleyball team
- Brazil women's national volleyball team
- Brazil women's national under-20 volleyball team
- Brazil women's national under-18 volleyball team
