= Antonela Fortuna =

Argentine volleyball player (born 1995)

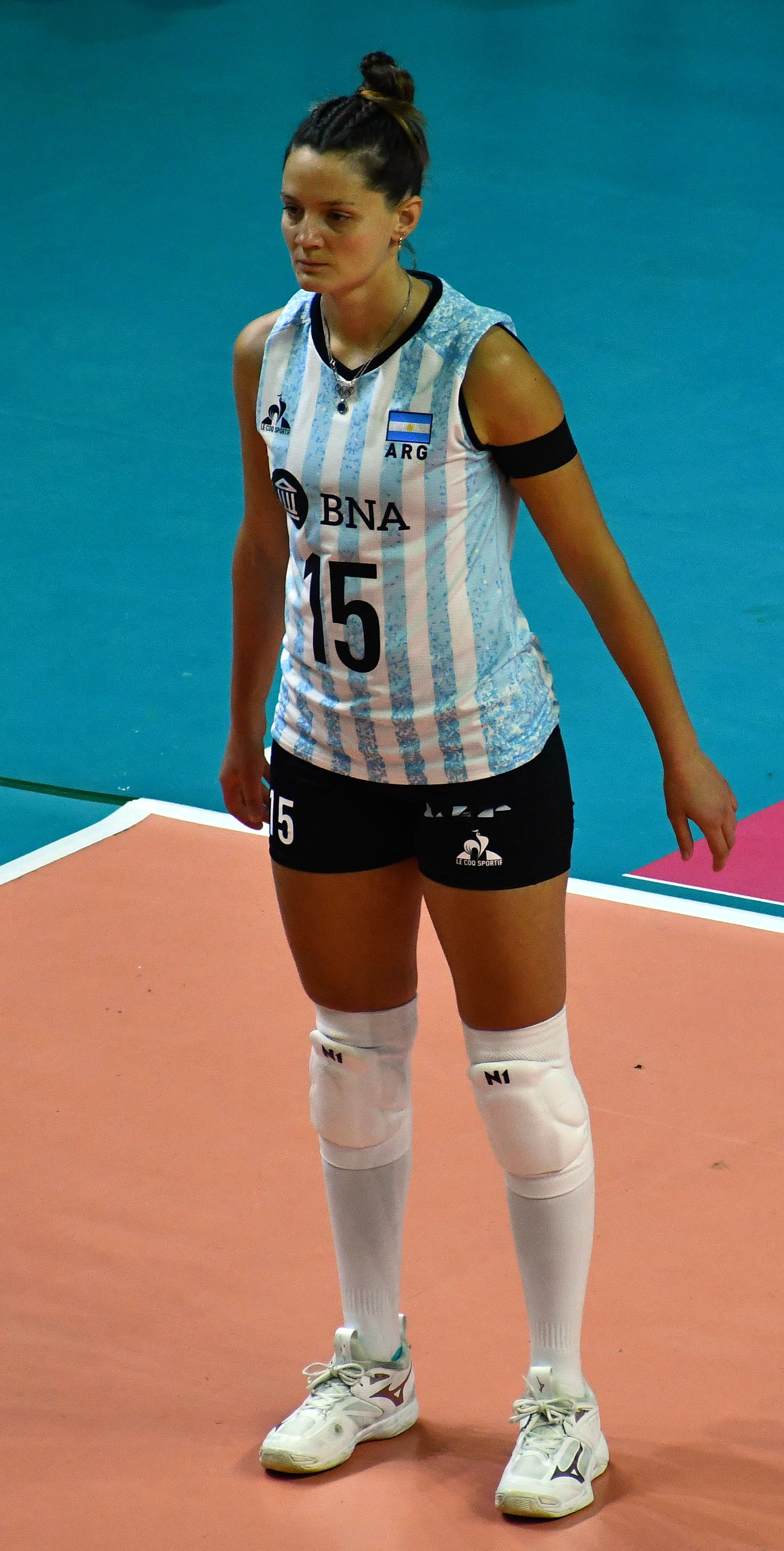
- Fortuna in 2024

Personal information
- Born: 10 May 1995 (age 31); San Carlos Centro, Argentina
- Height: 179 cm (5 ft 10 in)
- Weight: 65 kg (143 lb)
- Spike: 297 cm (117 in)
- Block: 287 cm (113 in)

Volleyball information
- Position: Outside hitter
- Number: 15 (national team)

Career
Years	Teams
2012–2013	Club Atlético Villa Dora
2013–2018	San Lorenzo de Almagro
2018–2019	Újpesti TE

National team
2011–2017	Argentina youth teams
2015–	Argentina
Honours
Representing Argentina
Pan American Games
Bronze medal – third place	2019 Lima	Team

Antonela Fortuna (born 10 May 1995) is an Argentine volleyball player, who plays as an outside hitter at Hungarian club Újpesti TE and the Argentina women's national volleyball team. She competed at the 2020 Summer Olympics.

== Career ==
She participated in the 2017 FIVB Volleyball Women's U23 World Championship, 2017 FIVB Volleyball World Grand Prix, 2018 FIVB Volleyball Women's World Championship, and 2018 FIVB Volleyball Women's Nations League.

At club level she played for San Lorenzo de Almagro from 2013 until May 2018. After participating of 2018 FIVB Volleyball Women's World Championship, she decided to move to Hungary signing for Újpesti TE from NB I Women.

== Clubs ==
- (Argentina) Club Atlético Villa Dora (2012–2013)
- (Argentina) San Lorenzo de Almagro (2013–2018)
- (Hungary) Újpesti TE (2019–)

== International career ==
=== National team ===
Competition	Host	Position
2016 Women's Pan-American Volleyball Cup	Dominican Republic	Fifth Place
2017 Montreux Volley Masters	Switzerland	Fourth Place
2017 FIVB Volleyball World Grand Prix		Group Stage
2018 FIVB Volleyball Women's World Championship qualification (CSV)	Peru	Winners
2018 FIVB Volleyball Women's Nations League		Group Stage
2018 Women's Pan-American Volleyball Cup	Dominican Republic	Group Stage
2018 FIVB Volleyball Women's World Championship	Japan	Group Stage

=== Youth teams ===
Competition	Host	Position
2011 Women's U17 Pan-American Volleyball Cup	Mexico	Champions
2011 FIVB Volleyball Women's U17 World Championship	Turkey	Round of 8
2012 Women's U23 Pan-American Volleyball Cup	Peru	Third Place
2013 FIVB Volleyball Women's U23 World Championship	Mexico	Group Stage
2014 Women's U22 South American Volleyball Championship	Colombia	Fourth Place
2016 Women's U22 South American Volleyball Championship	Peru	Fourth Place
2016 Women's U23 Pan-American Volleyball Cup	Dominican Republic	Runners-up
2017 FIVB Volleyball Women's U23 World Championship	Slovenia	Group Stage
