= Women's U22 South American Volleyball Championship =

International volleyball competition

- Current season, competition or edition: 2016 Women's U22 South American Volleyball Championship
- Sport: Volleyball
- Founded: 2014
- No. of teams: 6
- Continent: South America (CSV)
- Most recent champion: Brazil (2nd title)
- Most titles: Brazil (2 titles)

The Women's U22 South American Volleyball Championship is a sport competition for national women's volleyball teams with players under 23 years, currently held biannually and organized by the Confederación Sudamericana de Voleibol (CSV), the South America volleyball federation. The first championship was held in Popayán, Colombia, in 2014.

== Results summary ==
Year	Host	Final			3rd place match			Teams
Year	Host	Champions	Score	Runners-up	3rd place	Score	4th place	Teams
2014; Details	(Colombia); Popayán	Brazil	Round-robin	Colombia	Peru	Round-robin	Argentina	6
2016; Details	(Peru); Lima	Brazil	3–1	Colombia	Peru	3–1	Argentina	6

== Medal table ==
Rank	Nation	Gold	Silver	Bronze	Total
1	Brazil	2	0	0	2
2	Colombia	0	2	0	2
3	Peru	0	0	2	2
Totals (3 entries)		2	2	2	6

== Most valuable player by edition ==
- 2014 – Ángela Leyva (PER)
- 2016 – María Marín (COL)

== See also ==
- Men's U23 South American Volleyball Championship
- Women's Junior South American Volleyball Championship
- Girls' Youth South American Volleyball Championship
- Girls' U16 South American Volleyball Championship
