= María Marín =

Colombian volleyball player

Personal information
- Full name: María Alejandra Marín Verhelst
- Nationality: Colombian
- Born: 4 November 1995 (age 30)
- Height: 178 cm (5 ft 10 in)
- Weight: 68 kg (150 lb)
- Spike: 281 cm (111 in)
- Block: 270 cm (106 in)
- Education: Universidad Tecnológica de Bolívar

Volleyball information
- Current club: São José dos Pinhais

Career
Years	Teams
2010-2017	Liga Bolivarense
2016-2017	ASPTT Mulhouse
2017-2018	São José dos Pinhais

National team
2015-	Colombia
Honours
Women's volleyball
Representing Colombia
Pan American Games
Silver medal – second place	2019 Lima	Team
Central American and Caribbean Games
Silver medal – second place	2026 Santo Domingo	Team
South American Championship
Silver medal – second place	2017 Cali
Silver medal – second place	2019 Cajamarca
Silver medal – second place	2021 Barrancabermeja
Bronze medal – third place	2015 Cartagena
Bolivarian Games
Bronze medal – third place	2013 Trujillo	Team
Bronze medal – third place	2017 Santa Marta	Team

María Alejandra Marín Verhelst (born 4 November 1995) is a Colombian volleyball player. She is part of the Colombia women's national volleyball team.

== Career ==
With Bolivar, she won the 2010 Colombian Youth National Championship and the 2010 Colombian Junior Championship. She claimed the fifth place in the 2010 Youth South American Championship held in Peru.

She won the silver medal in the 2011 Colombia Junior Championship, representing Bolivar and later she won with Bolivar the 2011 Inter Schools Championships.

=== 2013 ===
In the 2013 Copa Latina, she won with her national team the gold medal and the Best Setter award. In June she traveled to Brno, Czech Republic, to play the 2013 FIVB U20 World Championship, ending up in the 13th place. She finished the pool play round as the top setter; she recalled that she found very important spending four months practicing together and would like to have faced the tournament with even harder strength. She won the 2013 Colombian Championship in the senior category with Bolivar. She won the 2013 Bolivarian Games bronze medal with her national team.

=== 2014 ===
Marín won with Bolivar the 2014 Colombian National Senior Championship played in Cali. In August 2014, Gómez won the silver medal in the 2014 U22 South American Championship.

She won the Best Setter award in the 2014 U23 Pan-American Cup.

=== 2015 ===
On club level she played for Liga Bolivarense in 2015. With Liga Bolivarense she claimed the 2015 National Games championship over the Antioquia team without losing a single set in the whole tournament. In the 2015 South American Championship, she won the bronze medal with her national team and was awarded tournament's Best Setter.

=== 2016 ===
Marín joined the French club ASPTT Mulhouse. She helped Bolivar to win the 2016 Colombian U21 National Championship. She won the 2016 U22 South American Championship silver medal and the Best Setter and Most Valuable Player awards.

She was awarded 2016 Volleyball player of the year by the Colombian Volleyball Federation and the Colombia Olympic Committee.

=== 2017 ===
With ASPTT Mulhouse, Marín won the 2016/17 French Championship. After returning from France, she won the 2017 Colombian Senior Championship as the captain of the Bolivar team, their fifth championship. She played with her national senior team the 2017 South American Championship, winning the silver medal when they lost 0–3 to Brazil, winning the Best Setter individual award. She played in October the 2018 FIVB World Championship CSV qualification tournament, but her team could not get a berth for next year competition.

She won the bronze medal in the 2017 Bolivarian Games under 23 tournament. She won the 2017 Volleyball player of the year in December, 2017.

=== 2026 ===
Marín won the silver medal at the 2026 Central American and Caribbean Games with her national team.

== Personal life ==
She studied in the Institución Educativa Soledad Acosta de Samper (I.E.S.A.S.) high school and as of 2015 she was studying business administration in the Universidad Tecnológica de Bolívar.

== Awards ==
=== Individuals ===
- 2013 Copa Latina "Best Setter"
- 2014 U23 Pan-American Cup "Best Setter"
- 2015 South American Championship "Best Setter"
- 2016 U22 South American Championship "Most Valuable Player"
- 2016 U22 South American Championship "Best Setter"
- 2017 South American Championship "Best Setter"
- 2021 South American Championship "Best Setter"

=== Clubs ===
- 2014 Colombian Championship – Champion, with Liga Bolivarense
- 2016-17 French Championship – Champion, with ASPTT Mulhouse
- 2017 Colombian Championship – Champion, with Liga Bolivarense
- 2018 Superliga B - Vice campeã

Awards
Preceded by (Venezuela) Ahizar Zuniaga	Best Setter of South American Championship; 2015; 2017	Succeeded by TBD
