= 2021 FIVB Women's Volleyball Nations League squads =

This article shows the roster of all participating teams at the 2021 FIVB Volleyball Women's Nations League.

== Belgium ==
The following is the Belgium roster in the 2021 Women's Nations League.

Head coach: (Belgium) Gert Vande Broek

- 2 Elise Van Sas L
- 3 Britt Herbots OH
- 4 Nathalie Lemmens MB
- 5 Jodie Guilliams OH
- 6 Helena Gilson OP
- 7 Celine Van Gestel OH
- 8 Kaja Grobelna OS
- 9 Nel Demeyer L
- 10 Dominika Sobolska MB
- 12 Charlotte Krenicky S
- 13 Marlies Janssens MB
- 14 Lise De Valkeneer OH
- 15 Jutta Van De Vyver S
- 17 Ilka Van de Vyver S
- 18 Britt Rampelberg L
- 19 Silke Van Avermaet MB
- 21 Manon Stragier OP

== Brazil ==
The following is the Brazil roster in the 2021 Women's Nations League.

Head coach: (Brazil) José Roberto Guimarães

- 2 Carol Gattaz MB
- 3 Dani Lins S
- 5 Adenízia da Silva MB
- 6 Nyeme Costa L
- 7 Rosamaria Montibeller OP
- 8 Macris Carneiro S
- 9 Roberta Ratzke S
- 10 Gabriela Guimarães OH
- 11 Tandara Caixeta OP
- 12 Natália Pereira OH
- 13 Sheilla Castro OP
- 15 Ana Carolina da Silva MB
- 16 Fernanda Garay OH
- 17 Ana Cristina de Souza OH
- 18 Camila Brait L
- 20 Ana Beatriz Corrêa MB
- 24 Lorenne Teixeira OP
- 28 Mayany de Souza MB

== Canada ==
The following is the Canada roster in the 2021 Women's Nations League.

Head coach: (Australia) Shannon Winzer

- 1 Cassandra Bujan L
- 3 Kiera Van Ryk OP
- 5 Danielle Smith S
- 6 Jazmine Ruth White MB
- 7 Layne Van Buskirk MB
- 8 Alicia Ogoms MB
- 9 Alexa Gray OP
- 11 Andrea Mitrović OP
- 12 Jennifer Cross MB
- 13 Brie King S
- 14 Hilary Howe OP
- 15 Shainah Joseph OS
- 16 Caroline Livingston OP
- 18 Kim Robitaille S
- 19 Emily Maglio MB
- 22 Kennedy Snape L
- 23 Parker Austin OP

== China ==
The following is the China roster in the 2021 Women's Nations League.

Head coach: (China) Lang Ping

- 1 Yuan Xinyue MB
- 2 Zhu Ting OP
- 3 Diao Linyu S
- 4 Yang Hanyu MB
- 5 Gao Yi MB
- 6 Gong Xiangyu OS
- 7 Wang Yuanyuan MB
- 8 Li Yao OP
- 9 Zhang Changning OP
- 10 Liu Xiaotong OP
- 11 Yao Di S
- 12 Li Yingying OP
- 14 Zheng Yixin MB
- 15 Lin Li L
- 16 Ding Xia S
- 17 Yan Ni MB
- 18 Wang Mengjie L
- 19 Liu Yanhan OP
- 22 Duan Fang OP

== Dominican Republic ==
The following is the Dominican Republic roster in the 2021 Women's Nations League.

Head coach: (Brazil) Marcos Kwiek

- 1 Annerys Vargas MB
- 3 Lisvel Elisa Eve U
- 5 Brenda Castillo L
- 6 Camil Domínguez S
- 7 Niverka Marte S
- 11 Marifranchi Rodríguez MB
- 12 Yokaty Pérez S
- 14 Prisilla Rivera OP
- 16 Yonkaira Peña OP
- 17 Gina Mambrú OS
- 18 Bethania de la Cruz OP
- 20 Brayelin Martínez OP
- 21 Jineiry Martínez MB
- 23 Gaila González OS
- 25 Larysmer Martínez Caro L

== Germany ==
The following is the Germany roster in the 2021 Women's Nations League.

Head coach: (Germany) Felix Koslowski

- 1 Linda Bock L
- 2 Pia Kästner S
- 4 Denise Imoudu S
- 5 Jana Franziska Poll OH
- 6 Jennifer Janiska OH
- 7 Ivana Vanjak OH
- 8 Kimberly Drewniok OS
- 9 Lina Alsmeier OH
- 10 Lena Stigrot OH
- 12 Hanna Orthmann OH
- 14 Marie Schölzel MB
- 16 Lea Ambrosius MB
- 17 Anna Pogany L
- 18 Magdalena Gryka S
- 20 Josepha Bock MB
- 21 Camilla Weitzel MB
- 24 Anastasia Cekulaev MB

== Italy ==
The following is the Italy roster in the 2021 Women's Nations League.

Head coach: (Italy) Giulio Cesare Bregoli

- 2 Francesca Bosio S
- 4 Sara Bonifacio MB
- 12 Anastasia Guerra OP
- 15 Sylvia Chinelo Nwakalor OS
- 19 Camilla Mingardi OP
- 21 Marina Lubian MB
- 23 Chiara De Bortoli L
- 24 Alessia Mazzaro MB
- 26 Ilaria Battistoni S
- 27 Eleonora Furlan MB
- 28 Giulia Melli OP
- 29 Sofia D'odorico OP
- 30 Federica Squarcini MB
- 31 Eleonora Fersino L
- 32 Loveth Omoruyi OP

== Japan ==
The following is the Japan roster in the 2021 Women's Nations League.

Head coach: (Japan) Kumi Nakada

- 1 Ai Kurogo OP
- 2 Sarina Koga OP
- 3 Haruyo Shimamura MB
- 4 Miyu Nagaoka OS
- 5 Erika Araki MB
- 7 Yuki Ishii OP
- 8 Mayu Ishikawa OP
- 9 Kanami Tashiro S
- 10 Aika Akutagawa MB
- 11 Yurie Nabeya OP
- 13 Mai Okumura MB
- 14 Mako Kobata L
- 15 Kotoe Inoue L
- 19 Nichika Yamada MB
- 20 Nanami Seki S
- 21 Kotona Hayashi OP
- 24 Aki Momii S

== South Korea ==
The following is the South Korea roster in the 2021 Women's Nations League.

Head coach: (Italy) Stefano Lavarini

- 1 Lee So-young OS
- 2 Lee Da-hyeon MB
- 3 Yeum Hye-seon S
- 5 Han Da-hye L
- 6 Kim Da-in S
- 7 Ahn Hye-jin S
- 8 Park Eun-jin MB
- 9 Oh Ji-young L
- 10 Kim Yeon-koung OS
- 12 Han Song-yi MB
- 13 Park Jeong-ah OP
- 14 Yang Hyo-jin MB
- 15 Yuk Seo-young OS
- 16 Jeong Ji-yun OP
- 19 Pyo Seung-ju OS

== Netherlands ==
The following is the Netherlands roster in the 2021 Women's Nations League.

Head coach: (Netherlands) Avital Selinger

- 1 Kirsten Knip L
- 2 Fleur Savelkoel OP
- 4 Celeste Plak OP
- 7 Juliët Lohuis MB
- 8 Demi Korevaar MB
- 9 Myrthe Schoot L
- 10 Sarah Van Aalen S
- 11 Anne Buijs OP
- 12 Britt Bongaerts S
- 13 Hester Jasper OP
- 16 Indy Baijens MB
- 18 Marrit Jasper OP
- 19 Nika Daalderop OP
- 21 Annick Meijers OP
- 23 Eline Timmerman MB
- 24 Laura de Zwart MB
- 26 Elles Dambrink OS
- 27 Iris Scholten OS

== Poland ==
The following is the Poland roster in the 2021 Women's Nations League.

Head coach: (Poland) Jacek Nawrocki

- 1 Julia Nowicka S
- 3 Klaudia Alagierska MB
- 5 Agnieszka Kąkolewska MB
- 8 Maria Stenzel L
- 9 Magdalena Stysiak OS
- 10 Zuzanna Efimienko MB
- 11 Martyna Łukasik OS
- 13 Monika Jagla L
- 17 Malwina Smarzek OS
- 19 Monika Fedusio OP
- 20 Martyna Czyrniańska OP
- 21 Karolina Drużkowska OS
- 23 Marta Krajewska S
- 27 Martyna Łazowska S
- 30 Olivia Różański OP
- 78 Aleksandra Gryka MB
- 88 Zuzanna Górecka OP

== Russia ==
The following is the Russia roster in the 2021 Women's Nations League.

Head coach: (Italy) Sergio Busato

- 2 Daria Malygina OS
- 4 Daria Pilipenko L
- 5 Arina Fedorovtseva OS
- 6 Irina Koroleva MB
- 8 Nataliya Goncharova OS
- 9 Valeriia Gorbunova OS
- 10 Polina Matveeva S
- 11 Yulia Brovkina MB
- 12 Anna Lazareva OP
- 13 Yevgeniya Startseva S
- 14 Irina Fetisova MB
- 15 Tatiana Kosheleva OP
- 16 Irina Voronkova OP
- 20 Ekaterina Lazareva S
- 22 Tamara Zaytseva L
- 23 Irina Kapustina OP
- 24 Ekaterina Pipunyrova OP
- 25 Kseniia Smirnova OP

== Serbia ==
The following is the Serbia roster in the 2021 Women's Nations League.

Head coach: (Serbia) Aleksandar Vladisavljev

- 2 Katarina Lazović OP
- 3 Sara Carić OS
- 6 Aleksandra Uzelac OP
- 7 Ana Jakšić S
- 21 Jovana Kocić MB
- 22 Sara Lozo OS
- 23 Mila Đorđević S
- 24 Sofija Medić MB
- 25 Božica Marković MB
- 26 Vanja Savić OS
- 27 Vanja Bukilić OS
- 28 Jelena Delić MB
- 31 Sanja Djurdjević L
- 32 Bojana Gočanin L
- 33 Jovana Cvetković OP
- 34 Jovana Mirosavljević OP

== Thailand ==
The following is the Thailand roster in the 2021 Women's Nations League.

Head coach: (Thailand) Kittikun Sriutthawong

- 2 Piyanut Pannoy L
- 3 Sirima Manakij S
- 5 Pleumjit Thinkaow MB
- 6 Onuma Sittirak OP
- 8 Tirawan Sang-Ob MB
- 9 Sutadta Chuewulim OP
- 10 Wilavan Apinyapong L
- 11 Amporn Hyapha MB
- 12 Tapaphaipun Chaisri OP
- 13 Nootsara Tomkom S
- 14 Pattiya Juangjan OP
- 15 Malika Kanthong OS
- 17 Gullapa Piampongsan S
- 19 Karina Krause MB
- 20 Soraya Phomla S
- 22 Chatsuda Nilapa OP
- 24 Watchareeya Nuanjam MB

== Turkey ==
The following is the Turkey roster in the 2021 Women's Nations League.

Head coach: (Italy) Giovanni Guidetti

- 2 Simge Şebnem Aköz L
- 3 Cansu Özbay S
- 4 Tuğba Şenoğlu OH
- 5 Şeyma Ercan OH
- 6 Kübra Akman MB
- 7 Hande Baladın OP
- 8 Yasemin Güveli MB
- 9 Meliha İsmailoğlu OP
- 10 Ayça Aykaç L
- 11 Naz Aydemir S
- 13 Meryem Boz OP
- 14 Eda Erdem Dündar MB
- 18 Zehra Güneş MB
- 19 Aslı Kalaç MB
- 99 Ebrar Karakurt OP

== United States ==
The following is the United States roster in the 2021 Women's Nations League.

Head coach: (United States) Karch Kiraly

- 1 Micha Hancock S
- 2 Jordyn Poulter S
- 3 Kathryn Plummer OH
- 4 Justine Wong-Orantes L
- 6 TeTori Dixon MB
- 7 Lauren Carlini S
- 8 Hannah Tapp MB
- 10 Jordan Larson OH
- 11 Andrea Drews OP
- 12 Jordan Thompson OP
- 13 Sarah Wilhite OH
- 14 Michelle Bartsch-Hackley OH
- 15 Kimberly Hill OH
- 16 Foluke Akinradewo MB
- 17 Megan Courtney L
- 22 Haleigh Washington MB
- 23 Kelsey Robinson OH
- 24 Chiaka Ogbogu MB
