= 2009 Volleyball Copa Latina =

2009 Copa Latina
Tournament details
- Host country: Peru
- Dates: May 14–17, 2009
- Teams: 4
- Venue: 1 (in Lima host cities)

Final positions
- Champions: Cuba (1st title)

The 2009 Copa Latina was first edition of the annual women's volleyball tournament, organized by the Peruvian Volleyball Federation, played by four countries from May 14–18, 2009 in Lima, Peru.

== Competing nations ==
Teams

Chile
Colombia
Cuba
Peru

=== Purpose ===
- Cuba participated in the tournament as preparation for the 2009 Pan-American Cup.
- Peru send the national youth team (U18) as preparation for the 2009 Youth World Championship
- Chile participated in the tournament as preparation for the 2009 South American Championship.
- Colombia participated in the tournament as preparation for the 2009 South American Championship.

== Preliminary round ==
Pos	Team	Pld	W	L	Pts	SW	SL	SR	SPW	SPL	SPR	Qualification
1	Cuba	3	3	0	6	9	0	MAX	225	136	1.654	Gold medal match
2	Peru	3	2	1	5	6	5	1.200	244	231	1.056	Gold medal match
3	Chile	3	1	2	4	5	6	0.833	211	231	0.913	Bronze medal match
4	Colombia	3	0	3	3	0	9	0.000	143	226	0.633	Bronze medal match

=== Matches ===
Date		Score		Set 1	Set 2	Set 3	Set 4	Set 5	Total
14 May	Cuba	3–0	Colombia	25–16	25–13	25–12			75–41
14 May	Peru	3–2	Chile	25–18	25–16	21–25	24–26	16–14	111–99
15 May	Cuba	3–0	Chile	25–6	25–17	25–14			75–37
15 May	Peru	3–0	Colombia	25–15	26–24	25–18			76–57
16 May	Chile	3–0	Colombia	25–15	25–21	25–9			75–45
16 May	Peru	0–3	Cuba	20–25	18–25	20–25			58–75

== Final round ==
=== Bronze medal match ===
Date		Score		Set 1	Set 2	Set 3	Set 4	Set 5	Total
17 May	Chile	3–2	Colombia	25–20	21–25	25–22	14–25	15–12	100–104

=== Gold medal match ===
Date		Score		Set 1	Set 2	Set 3	Set 4	Set 5	Total
17 May	Cuba	3–1	Peru	23–25	17–25	16–25	21–25		79–98

== Final standing ==
Rank	Team
1st place, gold medalist(s)	Cuba
2nd place, silver medalist(s)	Peru
3rd place, bronze medalist(s)	Chile
4	Colombia

2009 Copa Latina champions

Cuba
1st title
