= Volleyball Copa Latina =

The Copa Latina (Latin Cup) was a tournament organized by the Peruvian Volleyball Federation and Frecuencia Latina. This tournament serves as preparation for women national teams from all over the world to different Volleyball competitions, mainly the Pan-American Volleyball Cup. The Cup features Peru's national team and three invitees, the first two Cups only had teams from the Americas but since the third cup, European and Asian teams are invited also.

The format of the Cup has remained the same since the first edition, a preliminary round with a round-robin system between all four teams, the two top teams play the finals while the two bottom teams play for the bronze.

== History ==
Copa Latina
Year	Host	Winner	Runner-up	3rd Place	4th Place
2009; Details	Lima, Peru	Cuba	Peru	Chile	Colombia
2010; Details	Lima, Peru	Peru	Argentina	Colombia	Uruguay
2011; Details	Callao, Peru	Peru	Thailand	Great Britain	Chile
2012; Details	Lima, Peru	Cuba	Dominican Republic	Peru	Chile
2013; Details	Lima, Peru	Colombia	Dominican Republic	Mexico	Peru
2014; Details	Lima, Peru	Dominican Republic	Colombia	Cuba	Peru
2015; Details	Lima, Peru	Peru	Dominican Republic	Brazil	Cuba

== See also ==
- Peru women's national volleyball team
- Liga Nacional Superior de Voleibol
