= Camila Gómez =

Colombian volleyball player (born 1995)

Personal information
- Full name: Camila Fernanda Gómez Hernández
- Nationality: Colombian
- Born: 6 July 1995 (age 31); Cali, Valle del Cauca
- Height: 158 cm (5 ft 2 in)
- Weight: 61 kg (134 lb)
- Spike: 263 cm (104 in)
- Block: 260 cm (102 in)
- Education: Texas A&M

Volleyball information
- Position: Libero
- Current club: Omaha Supernovas
- Number: 31

Career
Years	Teams
2013-2014	CSU Târgu Mureș
2015	Liga Vallecaucana
2024-	Omaha Supernovas

National team
2015	Colombia
Honours
Women's volleyball
Representing Colombia
Pan American Games
Silver medal – second place	2019 Lima	Team
South American Championship
Silver medal – second place	2017 Cali
Bronze medal – third place	2015 Cartagena
Junior Pan-American Cup
Bronze medal – third place	2013 Havana
- Last updated: December 2017

Camila Fernanda Gómez Hernández (born 6 July 1995) is a Colombian volleyball player for the Omaha Supernovas of the Pro Volleyball Federation and the Colombia women's national volleyball team.

She played the 2013 FIVB U20 World Championship and the 2015 FIVB U23 World Championship. She won the silver bronze medal in the 2015 South American Championship and the silver in the 2017 edition being awarded Best Libero in both senior tournaments. Playing with her under ages teams, she won the Best Libero award in the 2010 Junior South American Championship, 2014 and 2016 U22 South American Championship and was awarded Best Receiver in the 2013 Junior Pan-American Cup, while conquering all defensive awards, Best Libero, Best Digger and Best Receiver in the 2014 U23 Pan-American Cup. Gómez played with the Romanian club CSU Târgu Mureș finishing in fourth place in the domestic league and in 8th finals from the 2013-14 CEV Challenge Cup. With the Miami Dade College Lady Sharks, Gómez won the 2016 and 2017 NJCAA National Championships.

== Career ==
=== 2010-2012 ===
She played the 2010 Youth South American Championship, winning the fifth place in the competition held in Peru. In the 2010 Junior South American Championship, she was awarded Best Libero and finished in fourth place. She won the gold medal and the individual awards of Most Valuable Player, Best Libero, Best Digger and Best Receiver in the II Copa Federacion 2012.

=== 2013 ===
She played the 2013 Pan-American Cup ending up in ninth place after only having two wins in the senior tournament played mostly with her junior national team. Gómez was elected Most Valuable Player, Best Libero, Best Digger and Best Receiver in the 2013 Copa Latina, earning with her team the competitions's gold medal. In the 2013 Junior Pan-American Cup she won the bronze medal and the Best Receiver award. In June she traveled to Brno, Czech Republic, to play the 2013 FIVB U20 World Championship, ending up in the 13th place. She played for the Romanian club CSU Târgu Mureș for the 2013/14 season. With this club she played the 2013–14 CEV Challenge Cup, winning 16th finals to the Belgian Asterix Kieldrecht with golden set.

=== 2014 ===
In the 8th finals in 2014, her team was defeated by the French ASPTT Mulhouse, ending their European season. In the Romanian league, CSU Târgu Mureș qualified to the league semifinals defeating 2-1 to CSM Târgoviște was defeated by Știința Bacău 0-3 in the semifinals and lost 0-3 to Volei Alba-Blaj in the bronze medal playoff.

In August 2014, Gómez won the Best Libero award and the silver medal in the 2014 U22 South American Championship. She was awarded Best Libero, Best Digger and Best Receiver in the 2014 U23 Pan-American Cup as well and the silver medal with her national U23 squad. She helped her national team to end up in the sixth place in the volleyball tournament held in the 2014 Central American and Caribbean Games in Veracruz, Mexico.

=== 2015 ===
She participated in the 2015 FIVB World Grand Prix, reaching the Group 3 Final Four and winning the group bronze medal. On club level she played for Liga Vallecaucana, winning the bronze medal in the 2015 National Games. She played in August the 2015 FIVB U23 World Championship where Colombia ranked tied in ninth place. Gómez won the 2015 South American Championship bronze medal with her national team and was awarded Best Libero.

=== 2016 ===
She participated in the 2016 FIVB Volleyball World Grand Prix qualifying to the Final Four, but losing the bronze medal match 2–3 to Peru. She won the 2016 U22 South American Championship silver medal and Best Libero award.

Playing with the Miami Dade College volleyball team, she won the Defensive Player of the Week award for the las two weeks of October 2016 in the Florida College System Activities Association (FCSAA). Gómez won the FCSAA State Championship and an All-Tournament award winning also the All-Southern Conference First Team acknowledgment. She helped Miami Dade Lady Sharks to win the National Junior College Athletic Association (NJCAA) national championship for the first time since 2004. She finished the season by having 11 matches with 25 or more digs and finished in fourth place in the NJCAA in digs per set with 6.94.

=== 2017 ===
Gómez achieved FCSAA All-Academic and Southern Conference All-Academic Team honors with a 3.44 GPA. In August 2017, Gómez won the Best Libero and the silver medal in the 2017 South American Championship. She played the 2017 FIVB Volleyball World Grand Prix group 2 and ranked in seventh place and 19th overall. She won with Miami Dade the Southern Conference District Championship State Championship and 2017 FCSAA All-Tournament Team inclusion and finally her second consecutive NJCAA national title that they won with an undefeated season mark of 34-0 and she won an All-Tournament team accolade.

=== 2024 ===
Gómez played for the Grand Rapids Rise of Pro Volleyball Federation in the team and league's inaugural 2024 season.

=== 2025 ===
Gómez signed with the Omaha Supernovas as a free agent for the 2025 season of the Pro Volleyball Federation.

== Personal life ==
Gómez was born on 6 July 1995 in Buenaventura, Valle del Cauca. She is a business student at Miami Dade College.

== Awards ==
=== Individuals ===
- 2010 Junior South American Championship "Best Libero"
- 2013 Copa Latina "Most Valuable Player"
- 2013 Copa Latina "Best Libero"
- 2013 Copa Latina "Best Digger"
- 2013 Copa Latina "Best Receiver"
- 2013 Junior Pan-American Cup "Best Receiver"
- 2014 U23 Pan-American Cup "Best Libero"
- 2014 U23 Pan-American Cup "Best Digger"
- 2014 U23 Pan-American Cup "Best Receiver"
- 2014 U22 South American Championship "Best Libero"
- 2015 South American Championship "Best Libero"
- 2016 U22 South American Championship "Best Libero"
- 2017 South American Championship "Best Libero"
- 2019 Pan American Games "Best Libero"
