= 2017 FIVB Volleyball Women's U23 World Championship – European qualification =

Tournament details
- Host country: Serbia
- Dates: 27–31 July 2016
- Teams: 6
- Venue: 1

The 2017 FIVB Volleyball Women's U23 World Championship – European qualification was the first edition of the tournament, which was played in Serbia from 27 July to 31 July 2016.

== Results ==
Pos	Team	Pld	W	L	Pts	SW	SL	SR	SPW	SPL	SPR
1	Turkey	5	4	1	13	14	5	2.800	456	391	1.166
2	Italy	5	4	1	11	13	6	2.167	440	419	1.050
3	Bulgaria	5	3	2	9	11	8	1.375	422	396	1.066
4	Poland	5	3	2	8	9	8	1.125	393	362	1.086
5	Serbia	5	1	4	4	7	13	0.538	425	439	0.968
6	Croatia	5	0	5	0	1	15	0.067	269	398	0.676

Date	Time		Score		Set 1	Set 2	Set 3	Set 4	Set 5	Total	Report
27 Jul	15:00	Poland	0–3	Italy	24–26	21–25	27–29			72–80	Report
27 Jul	17:30	Serbia	2–3	Bulgaria	25–22	25–17	21–25	22–25	9–15	102–104	Report
27 Jul	20:00	Turkey	3–0	Croatia	25–18	25–11	25–16			75–45	Report
28 Jul	15:00	Italy	3–2	Bulgaria	22–25	20–25	26–24	25–14	15–11	108–99	Report
28 Jul	17:30	Croatia	1–3	Serbia	25–20	9–25	19–25	15–25		68–95	Report
28 Jul	20:00	Poland	3–2	Turkey	24–26	21–25	25–22	25–21	15–12	110–106	Report
29 Jul	15:00	Bulgaria	3–0	Croatia	25–11	25–12	28–26			78–49	Report
29 Jul	17:30	Serbia	0–3	Poland	20–25	23–25	11–25			54–75	Report
29 Jul	20:00	Turkey	3–1	Italy	25–22	26–28	25–18	25–15		101–83	Report
30 Jul	15:00	Poland	0–3	Bulgaria	17–25	20–25	24–26			61–76	Report
30 Jul	17:30	Turkey	3–1	Serbia	23–25	25–21	25–22	25–20		98–88	Report
30 Jul	20:00	Italy	3–0	Croatia	25–23	25–22	25–16			75–61	Report
31 Jul	15:00	Bulgaria	0–3	Turkey	24–26	20–25	21–25			65–76	Report
31 Jul	17:30	Serbia	1–3	Italy	22–25	15–25	25–18	24–26		86–94	Report
31 Jul	20:00	Croatia	0–3	Poland	13–25	18–25	15–25			46–75	Report

== Final standing ==
Rank	Team
1st place, gold medalist(s)	Turkey
2nd place, silver medalist(s)	Italy
3rd place, bronze medalist(s)	Bulgaria
4	Poland
5	Serbia
6	Croatia

Qualified for the 2017 Women's U23 World Championship

== See also ==
- 2017 FIVB Volleyball Men's U23 World Championship – European qualification
