= 2010 Volleyball Copa Latina =

2010 Copa Latina
Tournament details
- Host country: Peru
- Dates: June 3–5, 2010
- Teams: 4
- Venue: 1 (in Lima host cities)

Final positions
- Champions: Peru (1st title)

The 2010 Copa Latina was second edition of the annual women's volleyball tournament, organized by the Peruvian Volleyball Federation and Frecuencia Latina, played by four countries from June 3–5, 2010 in Lima, Peru.

== Competing nations ==
Teams

Argentina
Colombia
Peru
Uruguay

=== Purpose ===
- Peru send the national junior team (U20) as preparation for the 2010 Junior South American Volleyball Championship
- Argentina send the national junior team (U20) as preparation for the 2010 Junior South American Volleyball Championship
- Colombia participated in the tournament to test a new team.
- Uruguay participated in the tournament as general preparation for the team.

== Round-Robyn ==
This edition of the tournament featured only a Round-Robyn system of matches, the team with the most points at the end of the round was declared the winner.

Pos	Team	Pld	W	L	Pts	SW	SL	SR	SPW	SPL	SPR
1	Peru	3	3	0	6	9	4	2.250	286	221	1.294
2	Argentina	3	2	1	5	8	5	1.600	299	278	1.076
3	Colombia	3	1	2	4	5	7	0.714	251	282	0.890
4	Uruguay	3	0	3	3	2	9	0.222	217	272	0.798

=== Matches ===
Date		Score		Set 1	Set 2	Set 3	Set 4	Set 5	Total
3 Jun	Colombia	3–1	Uruguay	25–21	25–22	20–25	25–18		95–86
3 Jun	Peru	3–2	Argentina	25–27	23–25	25–17	25–19	15–11	113–99
4 Jun	Colombia	1–3	Argentina	25–23	20–25	11–25	19–25		75–98
4 Jun	Peru	3–0	Uruguay	25–14	25–16	25–11			75–41
5 Jun	Argentina	3–1	Uruguay	27–29	25–19	25–19	25–23		102–90
5 Jun	Colombia	1–3	Peru	25–23	21–25	19–25	16–25		81–98

== Final standing ==
Rank	Team
1st place, gold medalist(s)	Peru
2nd place, silver medalist(s)	Argentina
3rd place, bronze medalist(s)	Colombia
4	Uruguay

2010 Copa Latina champions

Peru
1st title
