= 2017 FIVB Volleyball Men's U23 World Championship – European qualification =

Tournament details
- Host country: Croatia
- Dates: 27–31 July 2016
- Teams: 6
- Venue: 1

The 2017 FIVB Volleyball Men's U23 World Championship – European qualification was the first edition of the tournament, which was played in Croatia from 27 July to 31 July 2016.

== Results ==
Pos	Team	Pld	W	L	Pts	SW	SL	SR	SPW	SPL	SPR
1	Poland	5	5	0	13	15	4	3.750	446	356	1.253
2	Italy	5	4	1	13	14	5	2.800	447	399	1.120
3	Slovenia	5	3	2	9	10	7	1.429	388	369	1.051
4	Turkey	5	2	3	7	9	10	0.900	414	418	0.990
5	Bulgaria	5	1	4	3	3	13	0.231	319	381	0.837
6	Croatia	5	0	5	0	3	15	0.200	354	445	0.796

Date	Time		Score		Set 1	Set 2	Set 3	Set 4	Set 5	Total	Report
27 Jul	15:30	Bulgaria	0–3	Slovenia	20–25	16–25	24–26			60–76	Result
27 Jul	18:00	Turkey	0–3	Italy	21–25	17–25	24–26			62–76	Result
27 Jul	20:30	Croatia	0–3	Poland	21–25	11–25	20–25			52–75	Result
28 Jul	15:30	Italy	3–1	Slovenia	17–25	28–26	25–20	25–10		95–81	Result
28 Jul	18:00	Poland	3–0	Bulgaria	25–18	25–17	25–14			75–49	Result
28 Jul	20:30	Turkey	3–1	Croatia	25–21	25–21	23–25	25–14		98–81	Result
29 Jul	15:30	Slovenia	0–3	Poland	20–25	22–25	18–25			60–75	Result
29 Jul	18:00	Bulgaria	0–3	Turkey	16–25	20–25	21–25			57–75	Result
29 Jul	20:30	Croatia	1–3	Italy	27–29	18–25	25–23	15–25		85–102	Result
30 Jul	15:30	Turkey	1–3	Slovenia	25–21	19–25	22–25	17–25		83–96	Result
30 Jul	18:00	Italy	2–3	Poland	19–25	28–26	15–25	25–22	12–15	99–113	Result
30 Jul	20:30	Croatia	1–3	Bulgaria	17–25	25–20	17–25	21–25		80–95	Result
31 Jul	15:30	Poland	3–2	Turkey	25–14	21–25	25–20	22–25	15–12	108–96	Result
31 Jul	18:00	Bulgaria	0–3	Italy	23–25	14–25	21–25			58–75	Result
31 Jul	20:30	Slovenia	3–0	Croatia	25–15	25–18	25–23			75–56	Result

== Final standing ==
Rank	Team
1st place, gold medalist(s)	Poland
2nd place, silver medalist(s)	Italy
3rd place, bronze medalist(s)	Slovenia
4	Turkey
5	Bulgaria
6	Croatia

Qualified for the 2017 Men's U23 World Championship

== See also ==
- 2017 FIVB Volleyball Women's U23 World Championship – European qualification
