= 2013 Volleyball Copa Latina =

2013 Copa Latina
Tournament details
- Host country: Peru
- Dates: May 9 – 12, 2013
- Teams: 4
- Venue: 1 (in Lima host cities)

Final positions
- Champions: Colombia (1st title)

Tournament awards
- MVP: Camila Gómez (COL)

The 2013 Copa Latina is the fifth edition of the annual women's volleyball tournament, organized by the Peruvian Volleyball Federation and Frecuencia Latina, played by four countries from May 9–12, 2013 in Coliseo Eduardo Dibos, Lima, Peru.

This was the first edition of the Cup to be FIVB-recognized.

== Purpose ==
The organizers called the cup a 'Revenge Cup' for the top 4 teams at the 2013 Junior Pan-American Cup, with its main purpose to be a preparation for the 2013 FIVB Women's Junior World Championship.

- Peru send the national junior team (U20) as preparation for the 2013 FIVB Women's Junior World Championship.
- Dominican Republic send the national junior team (U20) as preparation for the 2013 FIVB Women's Junior World Championship.
- Mexico send the national junior team (U20) as preparation for the 2013 FIVB Women's Junior World Championship.
- Colombia send the national junior team (U20) as preparation for the 2013 FIVB Women's Junior World Championship.

== Preliminary round ==
This edition of the tournament featured a round-robin system of matches, if the teams in the top two places will play for the gold medal and the teams in third and fourth places for the bronze medal.

Pos	Team	Pld	W	L	Pts	SPW	SPL	SPR	SW	SL	SR
1	Colombia	3	2	1	6	280	266	1.053	7	5	1.400
2	Dominican Republic	3	2	1	4	274	300	0.913	7	7	1.000
3	Peru	3	1	2	4	293	274	1.069	6	7	0.857
4	Mexico	3	1	2	4	275	282	0.975	6	7	0.857

Date		Score		Set 1	Set 2	Set 3	Set 4	Set 5	Total
9 May	Mexico	2–3	Dominican Republic	18–25	17–25	25–16	25–23	9–15	94–104
9 May	Peru	3–1	Colombia	23–25	25–23	25–12	29–27		102–87
10 May	Dominican Republic	1–3	Colombia	11–25	26–24	19–25	22–25		78–99
10 May	Peru	1–3	Mexico	25–20	15–25	21–25	23–25		84–95
11 May	Mexico	1–3	Colombia	23–25	17–25	25–19	21–25		86–94
11 May	Peru	2–3	Dominican Republic	25–13	23–25	25–14	21–25	13–15	107–92

== Final round ==
=== 3rd place match ===
Date		Score		Set 1	Set 2	Set 3	Set 4	Set 5	Total
12 May	Peru	1–3	Mexico	21–25	21–25	26–24	18–25		86–99

=== Final ===
Date		Score		Set 1	Set 2	Set 3	Set 4	Set 5	Total
12 May	Colombia	3–0	Dominican Republic	25–17	25–11	25–15			75–43

== Final standing ==
Rank	Team
1st place, gold medalist(s)	Colombia
2nd place, silver medalist(s)	Dominican Republic
3rd place, bronze medalist(s)	Mexico
4	Peru

2013 Copa Latina champions

Colombia
1st title

== Individual awards ==
- Most valuable player
  - Camila Gómez (COL)
- Best Scorers (tied)
  - Alejandra Isiordia (MEX)
  - Ángela Leyva (PER)
- Best spiker
  - Ángela Leyva (PER)
- Best blocker
  - Melissa Rangel (COL)
- Best server
  - Alejandra Isiordia (MEX)
- Best digger
  - Camila Gómez (COL)
- Best setter
  - María Marín (COL)
- Best receiver
  - Camila Gómez (COL)
- Best libero
  - Camila Gómez (COL)
