= 2011 Volleyball Copa Latina =

2011 Copa Latina
Tournament details
- Host country: Peru
- Dates: May 27–30, 2011
- Teams: 4
- Venue: 1 (in Callao host cities)

Final positions
- Champions: Peru (2nd title)

The 2011 Copa Latina was the third edition of the annual women's volleyball tournament, organized by the Peruvian Volleyball Federation and Frecuencia Latina, played by four countries from May 27–30, 2011 in Coliseo Miguel Grau at Callao, Peru.

== Competing nations ==
Teams

Chile
Great Britain
Peru
Thailand

=== Purpose ===
- Peru participated in the tournament to test a new Coach, Luca Cristofani and as preparation for the 2011 World Grand Prix.
- Great Britain participated in the tournament to test the team that would play at the London Olympics as host.
- Chile participated in the tournament as preparation for their first participation at a Pan-American Cup in the 2011 edition of the tournament.
- Thailand participated in the tournament as preparation for the 2011 World Grand Prix.

== Preliminary round ==
Pos	Team	Pld	W	L	Pts	SW	SL	SR	SPW	SPL	SPR	Qualification
1	Peru	3	3	0	6	9	1	9.000	252	189	1.333	Gold medal match
2	Thailand	3	2	1	5	7	4	1.750	255	198	1.288	Gold medal match
3	Great Britain	3	1	2	4	4	6	0.667	203	230	0.883	Bronze medal match
4	Chile	3	0	3	3	0	9	0.000	132	225	0.587	Bronze medal match

=== Matches ===
Date		Score		Set 1	Set 2	Set 3	Set 4	Set 5	Total	Report
27 May	Great Britain	1–3	Thailand	25–22	14–25	23–25	12–25		67–97	
27 May	Peru	3–0	Chile	25–12	25–13	25–20			75–45	
27 May	Chile	0–3	Great Britain	20–25	15–25	19–25			54–75	
28 May	Peru	3–1	Thailand	25–22	23–25	25–18	25–18		98–83	
29 May	Thailand	3–0	Chile	25–8	25–11	25–13			75–33	
29 May	Great Britain	0–3	Peru	13–25	21–25	27–29			61–79	

== Final round ==
=== Bronze medal match ===
Date		Score		Set 1	Set 2	Set 3	Set 4	Set 5	Total
30 May	Great Britain	3–2	Chile	25–20	23–25	13–25	25–22	15–11	101–103

=== Gold medal match ===
Date		Score		Set 1	Set 2	Set 3	Set 4	Set 5	Total
30 May	Peru	3–1	Thailand	25–17	25–20	16–25	25–17		91–79

== Final standing ==
Rank	Team
1st place, gold medalist(s)	Peru
2nd place, silver medalist(s)	Thailand
3rd place, bronze medalist(s)	Great Britain
4	Chile

2011 Copa Latina champions

Peru
2nd title
