= Hande Baladın =

Turkish volleyball player

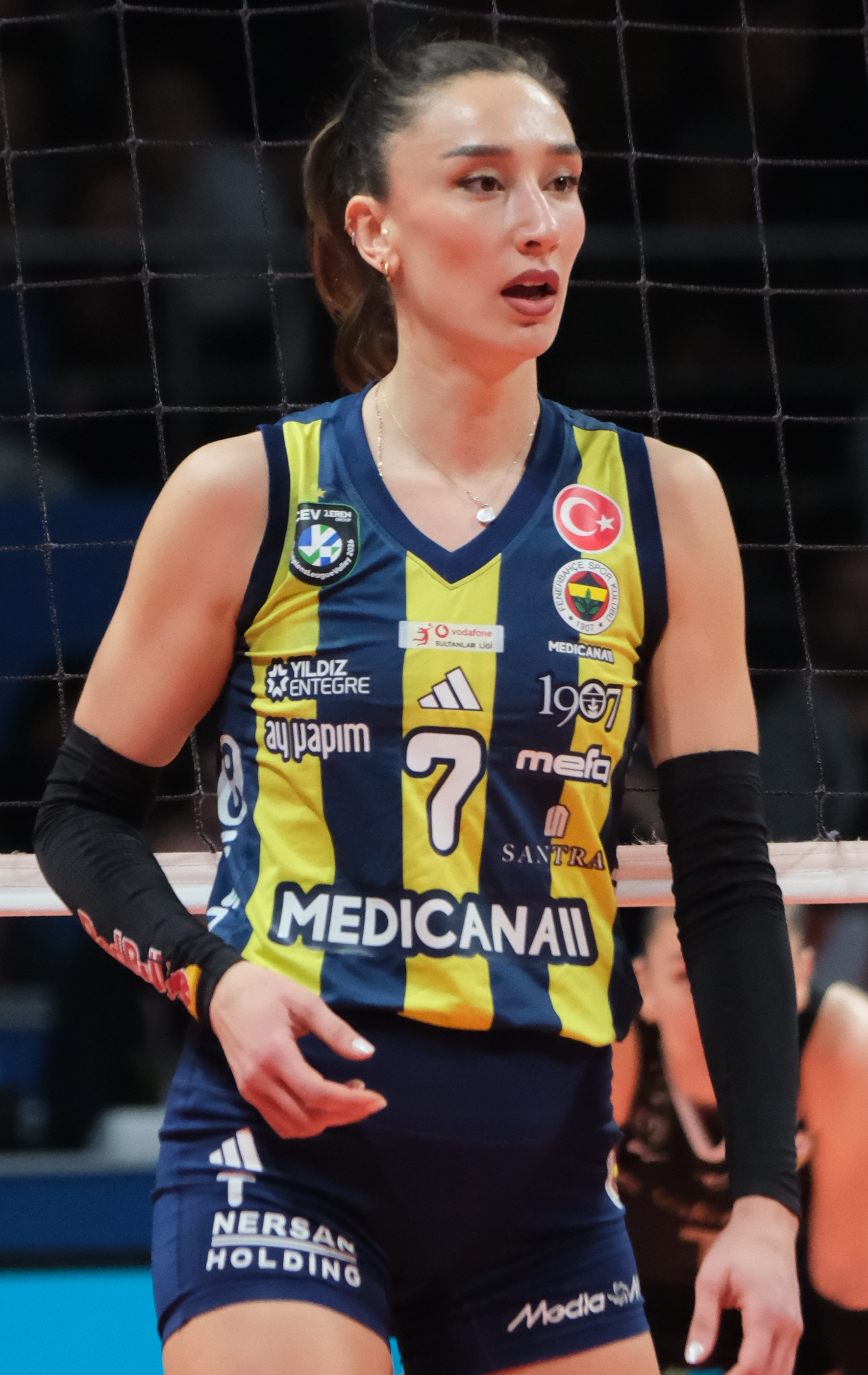
- Baladın in 2026

Personal information
- Nicknames: Handan, Baladinos
- Nationality: Turkish
- Born: 1 September 1997 (age 29) Kütahya, Turkey
- Height: 190 cm (6 ft 3 in)
- Weight: 81 kg (179 lb)
- Spike: 315 cm (124 in)
- Block: 305 cm (120 in)

Volleyball information
- Position: Outside hitter
- Current club: Fenerbahçe
- Number: 7

Career
- Years: Team
- 2013–2025; 2014–2015; 2018–2019; 2025–present: Eczacıbaşı VitrA; → Sarıyer Belediyespor; → Galatasaray; Fenerbahçe

National team
- Years: Team
- 2011–: Turkey
Honours
Women's volleyball
Representing Turkey
FIVB World Championship
Silver medal – second place	2025 Thailand	Team
FIVB Nations League
Gold medal – first place	2023 Arlington	Team
Gold medal – first place	2026 Macau	Team
Silver medal – second place	2018 Nanjing	Team
Bronze medal – third place	2021 Rimini	Team
European Championship
Gold medal – first place	2023 Belgium/Estonia/Germany/Italy	Team
Gold medal – first place	2026 Azerbaijan/Czech Republic/Sweden/Turkey	Team
Silver medal – second place	2019 Slovakia-Hungary-Poland-Turkey	Team
Bronze medal – third place	2017 Azerbaijan/Georgia	Team
Bronze medal – third place	2021 Serbia/Bulgaria/Croatia/Romania	Team
Women's U23 World Championship
Gold medal – first place	2017 Ljubljana	Team
Silver medal – second place	2015 Ankara	Team
Youth European Championship
Bronze medal – third place	2013 Bar

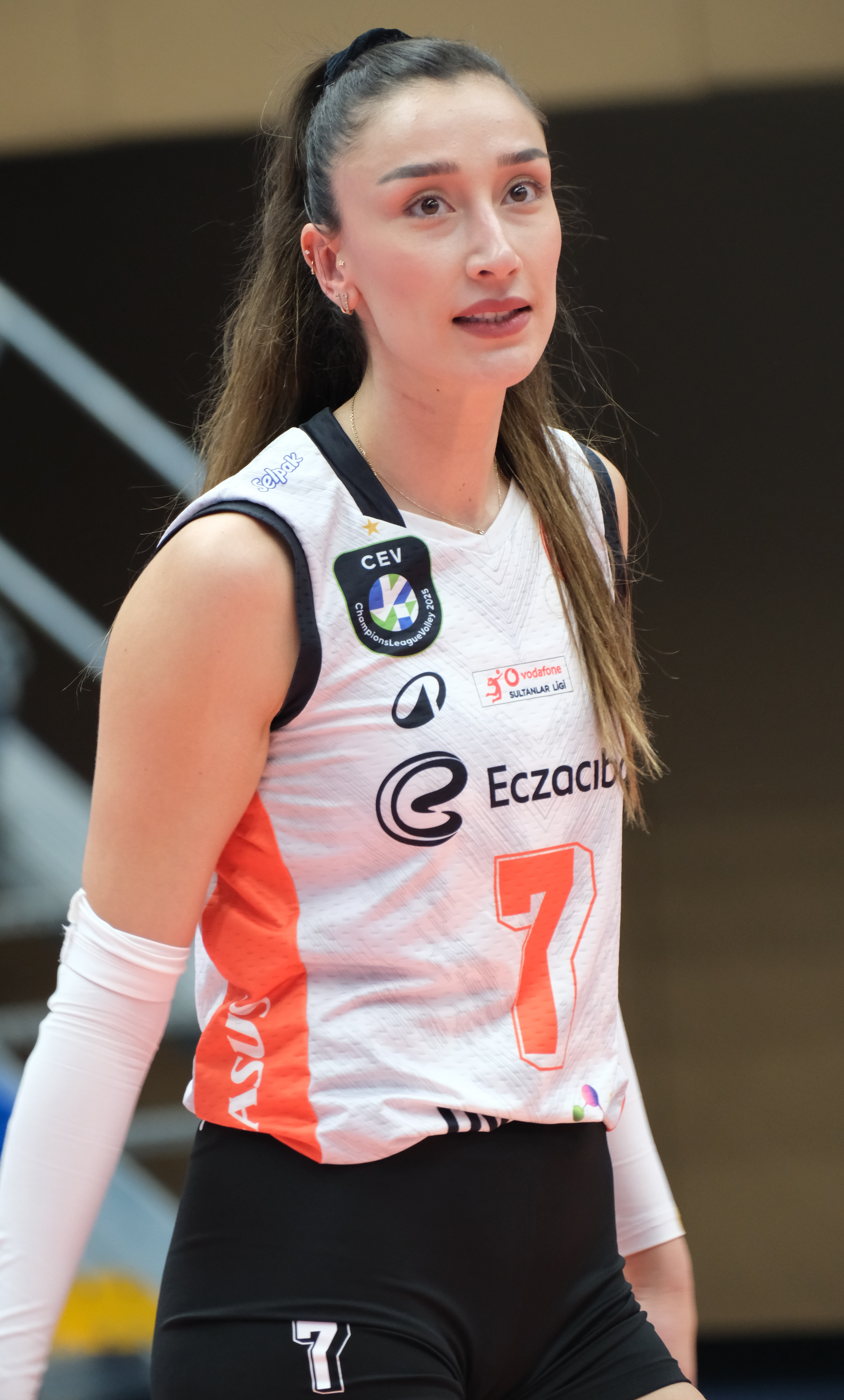

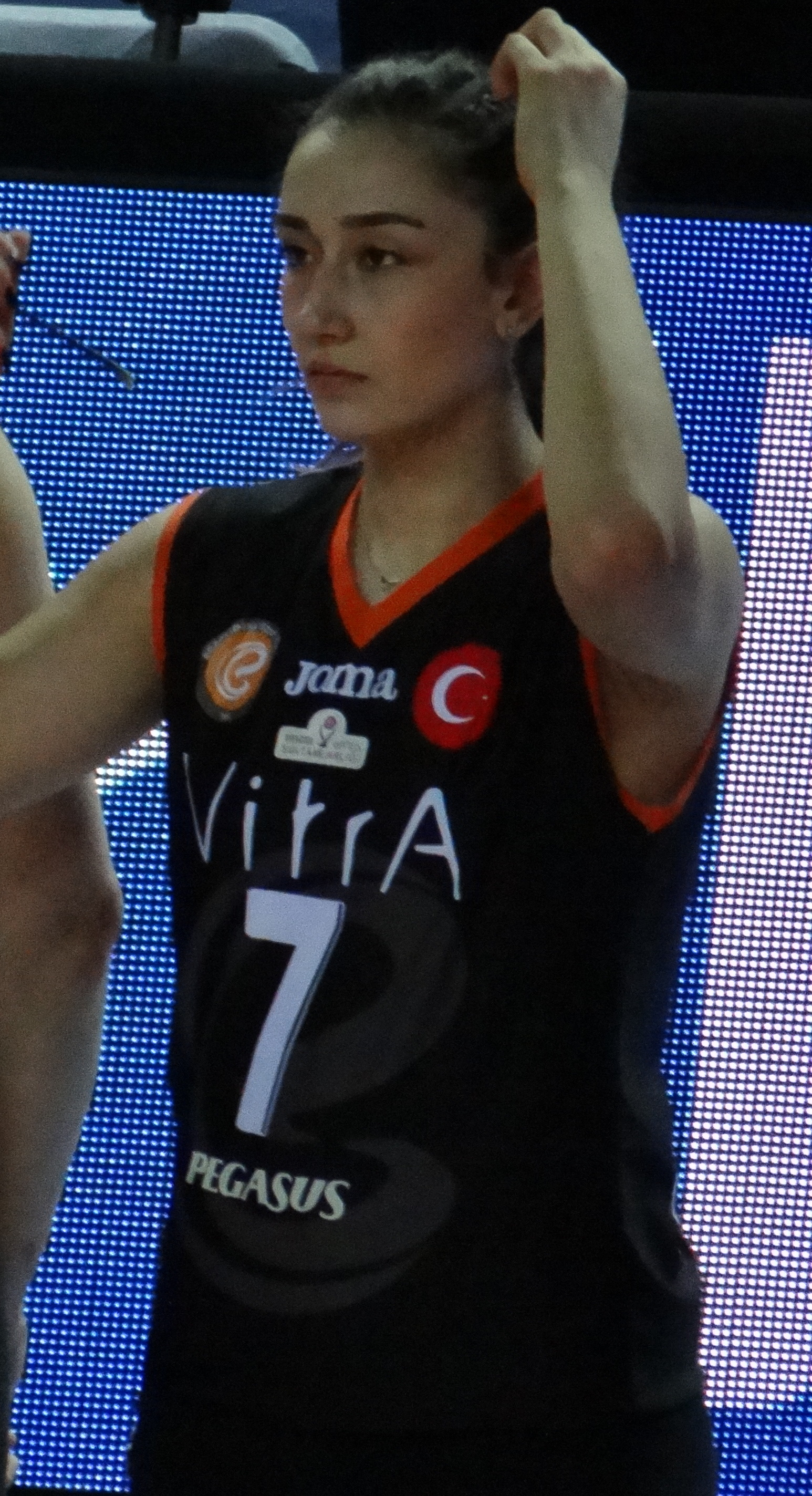

Hande Baladın (born 1 September 1997) is a Turkish professional volleyball player, playing for Fenerbahçe. She started playing volleyball as a middle blocker in the youth and junior teams of Eczacıbaşı Dynavit in Istanbul. She transitioned as an outside hitter in 2014 and continues to play in that position. Baladın is a member of the Turkey women's national volleyball team, and wears number 7. She received the 2026 Athlete of the Year Award.

== Career ==
=== Early career ===
She started her career with İzmir DSİ, then she also played for Arkas and İzmir Büyükşehir Belediyespor before she started playing for Eczacıbaşı Vitra in youth level (2009–2014).

=== Club ===
- Eczacıbaşı VitrA (2013–14)
- Sarıyer Belediyespor (2014–15) (loan)
- Eczacıbaşı VitrA (2015–18)
- Galatasaray (2018–19) (loan)
- Eczacıbaşı VitrA (2019–2025)
- Fenerbahçe (2025–present)

For the 2014–15 season, she was loaned out to Sarıyer Belediyespor along with four other players, Arelya Karasoy, Rida Erlalelitepe, Buse Ene and Aybüke Özdemir from the youth team of Eczacıbaşı Vitra. For the 2018–19 season, she was loaned out to Galatasaray along with Yasemin Güveli.

With Eczacıbaşı Vitra, she won the gold medal at the 2016 and 2023 FIVB Club World Championship.

=== International ===
In July 2011, she was admitted to the Turkey girls' youth national team. She played in the national team at the 2011 Balkan Championships held in Tirana, Albania on 12–18 July, at which they ranked fourth.

Baladın won the bronze medal with national team at the 2013 Girls' Youth European Volleyball Championship held in Serbia and Montenegro from 30 March to 7 April 2013. She was selected "Best blocker" of the championship.

== Awards ==
=== Club ===
Eczacıbaşı

- FIVB Club World Championship: (gold) 2016, 2023 (silver) 2019 (bronze) 2022
- CEV Champions League: (silver) 2022–23 (bronze) 2016–17, 2023–24
- CEV Cup: (gold) 2017–18, 2021–22
- Turkish Volleyball League: (silver) 2017–18, 2022–23, 2023–24 (bronze) 2013–14, 2015–16, 2021–22
- Turkish Cup: (bronze) 2017–18, 2020–21, 2023–24
- Turkish Super Cup: (gold) 2019–20, 2020–21 (silver) 2013–14, 2021–22, 2024–25

(Turkey) Fenerbahçe

- Turkish Super Cup: (gold) 2025–26

=== National team ===
- FIVB World Championship: (silver) 2025
- FIVB World Cup: (gold) 2023
- European Championship: (gold) 2023, 2026 (silver) 2019 (bronze) 2017, 2021
- FIVB Nations League: (gold) 2023, 2026 (silver) 2018 (bronze) 2021
- FIVB U23 World Championship: (gold) 2017 (silver) 2015
- CEV U19 European Championship: (bronze) 2014
- CEV U18 European Championship: (bronze) 2013

=== Individual ===
- 2013 Girls' Youth European Volleyball Championship - Best Blocker
- 2017 U23 World Championship - Best Outside Spiker
- 2017 U23 World Championship - Most Valuable Player
- 2026 Turkish Athlete of the Year

== See also ==
- Turkish women in sports
