= Natália Araújo =

Brazilian volleyball player (born 1997)

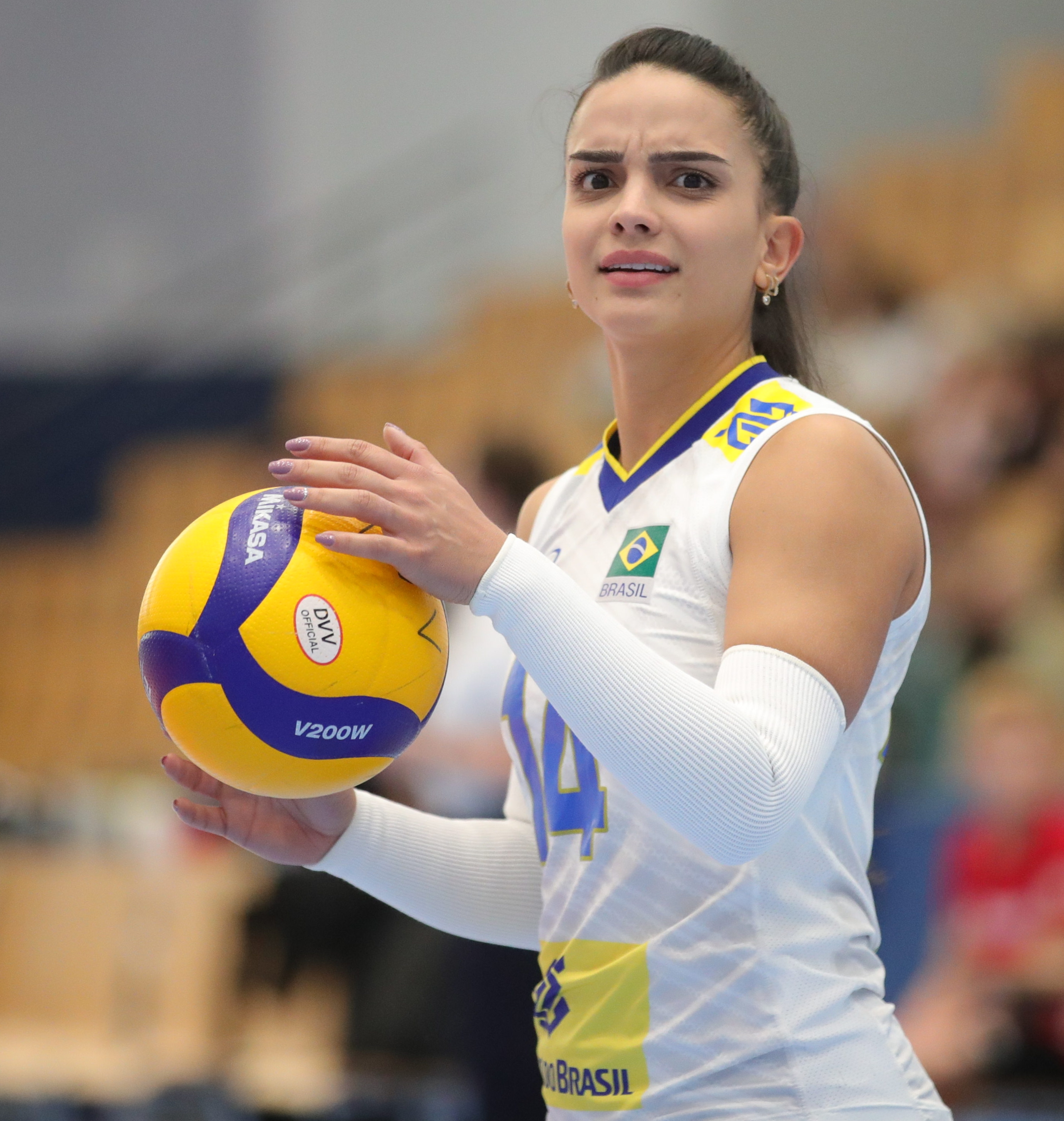
- Araujo in 2022

Personal information
- Full name: Natália Pereira de Araújo
- Nickname: Natinha
- Born: 10 April 1997 (age 29); Guarulhos, São Paulo, Brazil
- Height: 1.62 m (5 ft 4 in)
- Weight: 59 kg (130 lb)
- Spike: 228 cm (90 in)
- Block: 215 cm (85 in)

Volleyball information
- Position: Libero
- Current club: Praia Clube
- Number: 2

Career
Years	Teams
2011–2012	(Brazil) ADC Bradesco pt
2013–2014	(Brazil) Seleção Paulista
2016–2017	(Brazil) SESI-SP
2017–2019	(Brazil) Hinode Barueri
2019–2021	(Brazil) Sesc-RJ
2022	(Brazil) Osasco
2023–	(Brazil) Praia Clube

National team
2018–	Brazil
Honours
Women's volleyball
Representing Brazil
Olympic Games
Bronze medal – third place	2024 Paris	Team
FIVB World Championship
Silver medal – second place	2022 Poland/Netherlands	Team
Nations League
Silver medal – second place	2019 Nanjing	Team
Silver medal – second place	2022 Ankara	Team
Silver medal – second place	2026 Macau
South American Championship
Gold medal – first place	2021 Barrancabermeja	Team
Gold medal – first place	2023 Recife	Team
- Last updated: September 2023

Natália Araújo (Brazilian Portuguese pronunciation: [naˈtaliɐ aɾaˈuʒu]; born 10 April 1997) is a Brazilian indoor volleyball player. She is a current member of the Brazil women's national volleyball team.

== Career ==
She participated at the 2017 FIVB Volleyball Women's U23 World Championship, and 2019 FIVB Volleyball Women's Nations League.

Camila Brait's return to Osasco made Natinha's renewal unfeasible. On July 1, 2023, it was officially announced, on the Instagram profile of Praia Clube from Uberlândia, her hiring to defend the Minas Gerais team in the 2023–2024 season.

She represented Brazil at the 2024 Summer Olympics and won a bronze medal in the women's tournament.

== Clubs ==
- (Brazil) ADC Bradesco (2011–2012)
- (Brazil) Seleção Paulista (2013–2014)
- (Brazil) SESI-SP (2016–2017)
- (Brazil) Hinode Barueri (2017–2019)
- (Brazil) Sesc-RJ (2019–2021)
- (Brazil) Osasco (2022)
- (Brazil) Praia Clube (2023–)
