= Universidad Tecnológica de Bolívar =

University in Colombia

Coordinates: 10.3703°N 75.4653°W

- Type: Prevailed
- Established: 1970
- Director: Alberto Roa Varelo
- Address: Campus ternera: km 1 via Turbaco Campus manga: Street of the Bouquet cra.21 #25-92, Cartagena de Indias, Colombia
- Website: http://www.unitecnologica.edu.co

The Universidad Tecnológica de Bolívar is an institution of higher education in Bolívar, Colombia. In 2015 it was recognized as the third best undergraduate university in the country according to the MIDE. From its foundation in the year of 1970, the university is one of the main centres of higher education in the north of Colombia.

== Characteristics and location ==
It is a bilingual institution located in Cartagena de Indias. The companies of the city are the corporate partners of the university since 1975. There are two campuses: the Campus of Lemaitre's House in the Manga neighborhood and the Technologic Campus located to the outskirts of Cartagena in the Industrial Park and Technological "Carlos Vélez Pombo" in the Ternera neighborhood.

== History ==
UTB was founded on 5 August 1970 as an institution of education offering technological careers. It was the first private university established in Cartagena.

The yechnological aspects of the UTB have been recognised by the Bolivian Ministry of National Education, by means of the Resolution No 2996.
