= Lyara Medeiros =

Brazilian volleyball player

Personal information
- Nationality: Brazilian
- Born: September 19, 1996 (age 30)
- Height: 1.84 m (6 ft 1/2 in)
- Weight: 67 kg (148 lb)
- Spike: 297 cm (117 in)
- Block: 285 cm (112 in)

Volleyball information
- Position: Setter
- Current club: Bradesco

National team
2015 -	Brazil
Honours
Women's volleyball
Representing Brazil

Lyara Medeiros (born 19 September 1996) is a Brazilian volleyball player who has represented her country in youth and world championships. She is a member of the Brazil women's national under-23 volleyball team.

She was part of the Brazil national indoor volleyball team at the 2013 FIVB Volleyball Girls' U18 World Championship, 2015 Copa Panamericana, 2016 Women's U22 South American Volleyball Championship, 2015 FIVB Volleyball Women's U20 World Championship, and 2016 Montreux Volley Masters.

== Clubs ==
- 2016 Bradesco
