= Gabriela Candido =

Brazilian volleyball player (born 1996)

Gabriela Cândido

Personal information
- Full name: Gabriela Cândido da Silva
- Born: 22 May 1996 (age 30); Tamboara, Paraná, Brazil
- Height: 1.81 m (5 ft 11 in)
- Weight: 75 kg (165 lb)
- Spike: 296 cm (117 in)
- Block: 285 cm (112 in)

Volleyball information
- Position: Outside spiker
- Current club: Vôlei Bauru

National team
2018–2019	Brazil
Honours
Women's volleyball
Representing Brazil
South American Championship
Gold medal – first place	2019 Cajamarca
- Last updated: 2 September 2019

Gabriela Cândido (born 22 May 1996) is a Brazilian indoor volleyball player. She is a current member of the Brazil women's national volleyball team.

== Career ==
She participated at the 2015 FIVB Volleyball Women's U20 World Championship and 2017 FIVB Volleyball Women's U23 World Championship.

== Clubs ==
- (Brazil) SESC Rio (2015–2016)
- (Brazil) SESI São Paulo (2016–2017)
- (Brazil) Vôlei Bauru (2017–2020)
- (Brazil) Osasco Voleibol Clube (2020–)

== Awards ==
=== National team ===
- 2013 FIVB U18 World Championship
- 2015 FIVB U20 World Championship
