= Eva Pavlović Mori =

Slovenian volleyball player (born 1996)

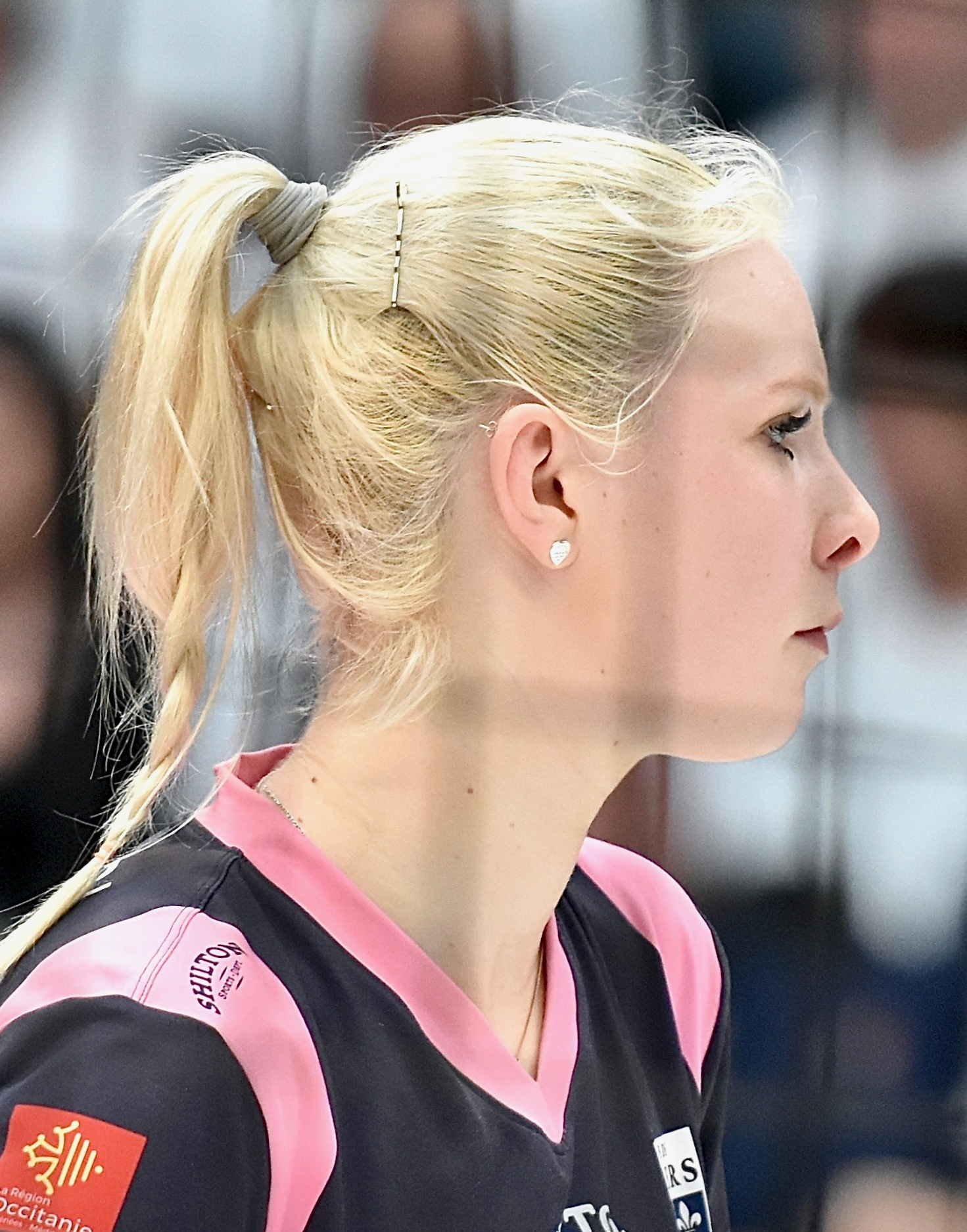

Personal information
- Nationality: Slovenian
- Born: 13 March 1996 (age 30); Kanal ob Soči, Slovenia
- Height: 186 cm (73 in)
- Spike: 290 cm (114 in)
- Block: 242 cm (95 in)

Volleyball information
- Position: Setter
- Current club: PTT Spor

Career
Years	Teams
2012–2014; 2014–2017; 2017–2018; 2018–2019; 2019–2020; 2020–2021; 2021; 2021–2022; 2022–	Calcit Volley; Volley Bergamo; Béziers Volley; Volero Le Cannet; ŁKS Łódź; İlbank Ankara; Vandœuvre Nancy; Calcit Volley; PTT Spor

National team
2015–	Slovenia
Honours
U23 World Championship
Silver medal – second place	2017 Ljubljana
Junior European Championship
Silver medal – second place	2014 Tampere/Tartu

Eva Pavlović Mori (born 13 March 1996) is a Slovenian female volleyball player, playing as a setter. She is part of the Slovenia women's national volleyball team.

With Slovenia, she competed at the 2015 Women's European Volleyball Championship. On the club level, she played for Calcit Volley, Volley Bergamo, Béziers Volley, Volero Le Cannet, ŁKS Łódź, Ilbank, Vandœuvre Nancy, and PTT Spor.
