= Barbara Frangella =

Argentine female volleyball player

Personal information
- Nationality: Argentine
- Born: 17 February 1996 (age 30)
- Height: 179 cm (70 in)
- Weight: 68 kg (150 lb)
- Spike: 289 cm (114 in)
- Block: 280 cm (110 in)

Volleyball information
- Number: 19 (national team)

Career
Years	Teams
2014	Boca Juniors

National team
2014	Argentina

Barbara Frangella (born 17 February 1996) is an Argentine female volleyball player. She is part of the Argentina women's national volleyball team.

She participated in the 2014 FIVB Volleyball World Grand Prix. On club level she played for Boca Juniors in 2014.
