= Lorenne Teixeira =

Brazilian volleyball player (born 1996)

Lorenne Geraldo Teixeira
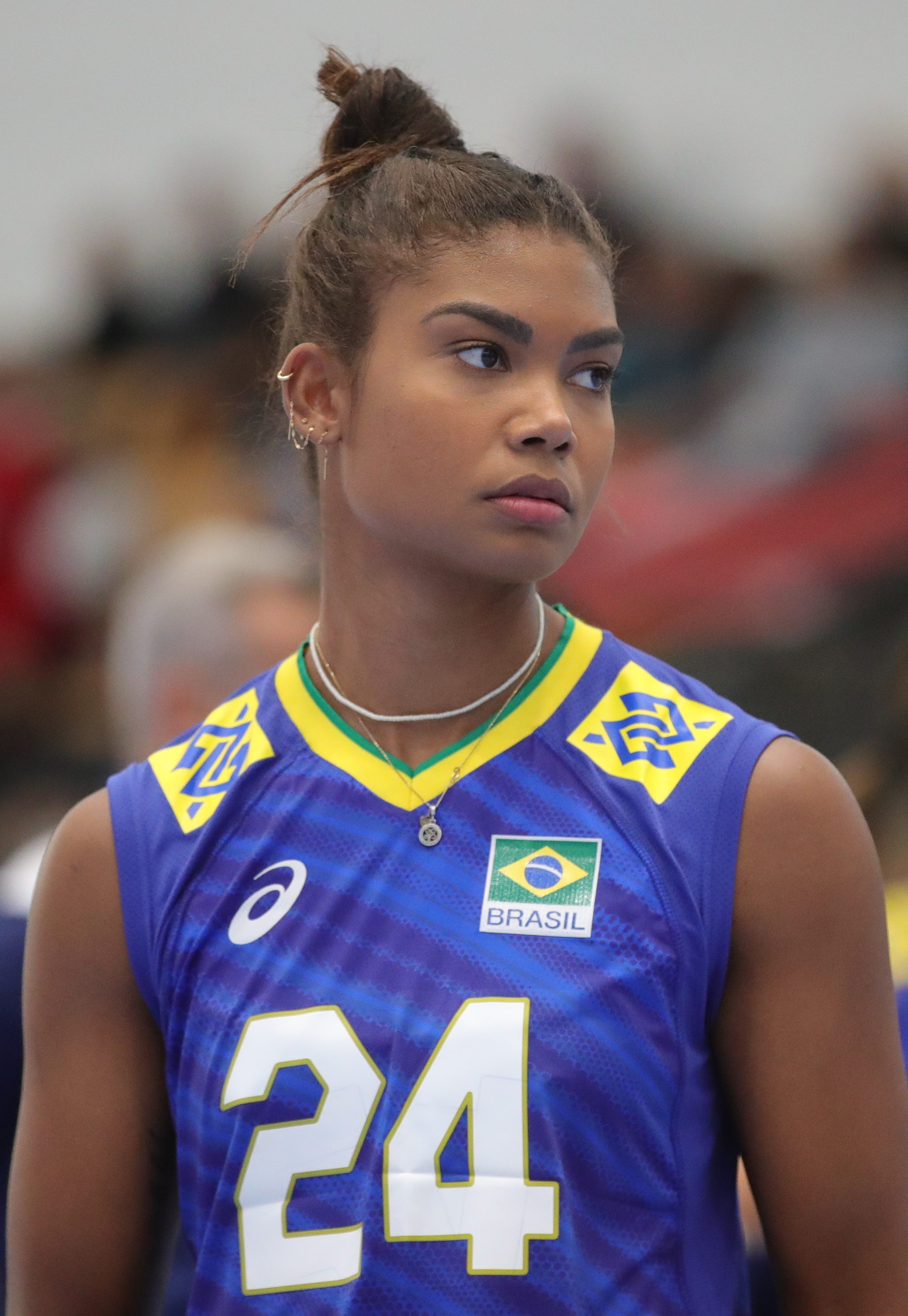

Personal information
- Nationality: Brazilian
- Born: 8 January 1996 (age 30)
- Height: 187 cm (6 ft 2 in)
Honours
Olympic Games
Bronze medal – third place	2024 Paris	Team
World Championship
Silver medal – second place	2022 Poland/Netherlands	Team
Nations League
Silver medal – second place	2019 Nanjing	Team
Silver medal – second place	2021 Rimini	Team
Silver medal – second place	2022 Ankara	Team
South American Championship
Gold medal – first place	2019 Cajamarca	Team
Gold medal – first place	2021 Barrancabermeja	Team

Lorenne Geraldo Teixeira (Brazilian Portuguese pronunciation: [loˈɾeni ʒeˈɾawdu te(j)ˈʃe(j)ɾɐ]; born 8 January 1996) is a Brazilian volleyball player. She represented Brazil at the 2024 Summer Olympics.
