= Mayany de Souza =

Brazilian volleyball player (born 1996)

Personal information
- Full name: Mayany Cristina Araújo de Souza
- Born: 24 November 1996 (age 29); Resende, Rio de Janeiro, Brazil
- Height: 1.85 m (6 ft 1 in)
- Weight: 72 kg (159 lb)
- Spike: 293 cm (115 in)
- Block: 282 cm (111 in)

Volleyball information
- Position: Middle blocker
- Current club: Kuzeyboru

National team
2019–2021	Brazil
Honours
Women's volleyball
Representing Brazil
Nations League
Silver medal – second place	2019 Nanjing	Team
Silver medal – second place	2021 Rimini	Team
South American Championship
Gold medal – first place	2021 Barrancabermeja	Team

Mayany de Souza (born 24 November 1996) is a Brazilian indoor volleyball player. She plays for Kuzeyboru in the Turkish Women's Volleyball League, and is a current member of the Brazil women's national volleyball team.

== Clubs ==
- (Brazil) São José Vôlei (2014–2015)
- (Brazil) Minas Tênis Clube (2015–2016)
- (Brazil) ABEL Brusque (2016–2017)
- (Brazil) Minas Tênis Clube (2017–2019)
- (Brazil) São Paulo/Barueri (2019–2020)
- (Brazil) Osasco Voleibol Clube (2020–2021)
- (Brazil) SESI/Vôlei Bauru (2021–)
- (Brazil) Hinode Barueri
- (Turkey) Kuzeyboru (2026–)

== Awards ==
=== Individuals ===
- 2016 U22 South American Championship – "Best Middle Blocker"
- 2018 FIVB Club World Championship – "Best Middle Blocker"

=== Clubs ===
- 2018–19 Brazilian Superliga – Champion, with Minas Tênis Clube
- 2018 South American Club Championship – Champion, with Minas Tênis Clube
- 2019 South American Club Championship – Champion, with Minas Tênis Clube
- 2018 FIVB Club World Championship – Runner-up, with Minas Tênis Clube
