= 2016 Women's U22 South American Volleyball Championship =

2016 Women's U23 South American Volleyball Championship
Tournament details
- Host country: Peru
- Dates: 27–31 July
- Teams: 6
- Venue: 1

The 2016 Women's U22 South American Volleyball Championship will be the second edition of the tournament, organised by South America's governing volleyball body, the Confederación Sudamericana de Voleibol (CSV).

== Preliminary round ==
=== Pool A ===
Pos	Team	Pld	W	L	Pts	SW	SL	SR	SPW	SPL	SPR	Qualification
1	Brazil	2	2	0	6	6	0	MAX	150	86	1.744	Semifinals
2	Argentina	2	1	1	3	3	3	1.000	119	124	0.960	Semifinals
3	Chile	2	0	2	0	0	6	0.000	91	150	0.607	5th-place match

Date	Time		Score		Set 1	Set 2	Set 3	Set 4	Set 5	Total	Report
27 Jul	17:00	Argentina	3–0	Chile	25–13	25–18	25–18			75–49	Result
28 Jul	14:45	Chile	0–3	Brazil	14–25	19–25	9–25			42–75	Result
29 Jul	14:45	Brazil	3–0	Argentina	25–14	25–20	25–10			75–44	Result

=== Pool B ===
Pos	Team	Pld	W	L	Pts	SW	SL	SR	SPW	SPL	SPR	Qualification
1	Colombia	2	2	0	6	6	1	6.000	176	126	1.397	Semifinals
2	Peru	2	1	1	3	4	3	1.333	172	131	1.313	Semifinals
3	Uruguay	2	0	2	0	0	6	0.000	59	150	0.393	5th-place match

Date	Time		Score		Set 1	Set 2	Set 3	Set 4	Set 5	Total	Report
27 Jul	14:45	Colombia	3–0	Uruguay	25–12	25–4	25–13			75–29	Result
28 Jul	17:00	Peru	3–0	Uruguay	25–11	25–5	25–14			75–30	Result
29 Jul	17:00	Peru	1–3	Colombia	23–25	28–26	23–25	23–25		97–101	Result

== Final round ==
=== 5th–6th place ===
Date	Time		Score		Set 1	Set 2	Set 3	Set 4	Set 5	Total	Report
30 Jul	13:30	Chile	3–0	Uruguay	25–18	25–14	25–16			75–48	Result

=== Final four ===
Semifinal
30 July
Brazil	3
Peru	1
30 July
Colombia	3
Argentina	1

Final
31 July
Brazil	3
Colombia	1
3rd place match
31 July
Peru	3
Argentina	1

==== Semifinals ====
Date	Time		Score		Set 1	Set 2	Set 3	Set 4	Set 5	Total	Report
30 Jul	15:45	Colombia	3–1	Argentina	25–17	25–16	24–26	25–23		99–82	Result
30 Jul	18:00	Brazil	3–1	Peru	23–25	25–23	27–25	25–16		100–89	Result

==== 3rd place match ====
Date	Time		Score		Set 1	Set 2	Set 3	Set 4	Set 5	Total	Report
31 Jul	15:45	Peru	3–1	Argentina	25–23	25–19	18–25	25–20		93–87	Result

==== Final ====
Date	Time		Score		Set 1	Set 2	Set 3	Set 4	Set 5	Total	Report
31 Jul	18:00	Brazil	3–1	Colombia	15–25	25–22	25–22	25–16		90–85	Result

== Final standing ==
Rank	Team
1st place, gold medalist(s)	Brazil
2nd place, silver medalist(s)	Colombia
3rd place, bronze medalist(s)	Peru
4	Argentina
5	Chile
6	Uruguay

Qualified for the 2017 Women's U23 World Championship

2016 Women's U23 South American Volleyball Championship

Brazil
2nd title

14–woman Roster
Drussyla Costa (c), Lyara Medeiros, Maira Claro, Karoline Tórmena, Lays Freitas, Natalia Silva, Fernanda Batista Lorenne Teixeta, Lais Vasques, Amabilie Koester, Lana Conceicao, Bruna Costa, Mayany de Souza, Vitoria Lage,
Head coach

== All-Star Team ==
- Most valuable player
  - María Alejandra Marín (COL)
- Best setter
  - María Alejandra Marín (COL)
- Best Opposite
  - Dayana Segovia (COL)
- Best Outside Hitters
  - Ángela Leyva (PER)
  - Drussyla Costa (BRA)
- Best Middle Blockers
  - Mayany de Souza (BRA)
  - Lays Freitas (BRA)
- Best libero
  - Camila Gómez (COL)

== See also ==
- 2016 Men's U23 South American Volleyball Championship
