= 2014 Women's U22 South American Volleyball Championship =

Tournament edition

Tournament details
- Host country: Colombia
- Dates: 20–24 August 2014
- Teams: 6
- Venue: 1 (in Popayán host cities)

Final positions
- Champions: Brazil (1st title)

Tournament awards
- MVP: Angela Leyva (PER)

The 2014 Women's U22 South American Volleyball Championship was the 1st edition of the tournament, organised by South America's governing volleyball body, the Confederación Sudamericana de Voleibol (CSV). The championship took place 20–24 August in Popayán, Colombia. The event served as a rating for the 2015 FIVB Women's U23 Volleyball World Championship.

== Competing nations ==
Pool A

Argentina
Brazil
Chile
Colombia
Peru
Venezuela

== Competition format ==
The 2014 Women's U22 South American Volleyball Championship consisted of a single round-robin pool between the six teams, the champion was determined from the ranking after the round.

== Competition ==
- All times are Colombia Standard Time (UTC-5)

Pos	Team	Pld	W	L	Pts	SW	SL	SR	SPW	SPL	SPR
1	Brazil	5	5	0	15	15	0	MAX	375	210	1.786
2	Colombia	5	4	1	12	12	4	3.000	356	308	1.156
3	Peru	5	3	2	8	9	9	1.000	389	369	1.054
4	Argentina	5	2	3	7	8	10	0.800	371	381	0.974
5	Chile	5	1	4	3	5	12	0.417	301	403	0.747
6	Venezuela	5	0	5	0	1	15	0.067	277	398	0.696

Date	Time		Score		Set 1	Set 2	Set 3	Set 4	Set 5	Total
20-Aug	15:00	Peru	3–2	Argentina	18–25	25–21	25–21	21–25	15–10	104–102
20-Aug	17:00	Chile	0–3	Brazil	14–25	14–25	9–25			37–75
20-Aug	21:00	Venezuela	1–3	Colombia	25–23	13–25	15–25	20–25		73–98
21-Aug	15:00	Brazil	3–0	Peru	25–17	25-21	25–12			75–50
21-Aug	17:00	Argentina	3–0	Venezuela	25–17	25–13	25–19			75–49
21-Aug	19:00	Colombia	3–0	Chile	25–15	25–12	25–15			75–42
22-Aug	15:00	Peru	3–1	Chile	24–26	25–14	25–19	25–10		99–69
22-Aug	17:00	Brazil	3–0	Venezuela	25–22	25–17	25–12			75–51
22-Aug	19:00	Argentina	0–3	Colombia	17–25	17–25	23–25			57–75
23-Aug	15:00	Chile	3–0	Venezuela	25–16	25–18	25–22			75–56
23-Aug	17:00	Brazil	3–0	Argentina	25–11	25–16	25–12			75–39
23-Aug	19:00	Colombia	3–0	Peru	25–23	25–20	25–18			75–61
24-Aug	14:00	Venezuela	0–3	Peru	21–25	13–25	14–25			48–75
24-Aug	16:00	Argentina	3–1	Chile	25–19	25–13	23–25	25–21		98–78
24-Aug	18:00	Colombia	0–3	Brazil	13–25	8–25	12–25			33–75

== Final standing ==
Rank	Team
1st place, gold medalist(s)	Brazil
2nd place, silver medalist(s)	Colombia
3rd place, bronze medalist(s)	Peru
4	Argentina
5	Chile
6	Venezuela

2014 Women's U22 South American Volleyball Championship

Brazil
1st title

Qualified for the 2015 Women's U23 World Championship

== All-Star Team ==
- Most valuable player
  - Angela Leyva (PER)
- Best setter
  - Juma Silva (BRA)
- Best Opposite
  - Ana Paula Borgo (BRA)
- Best Outside Hitters
  - Gabriella Souza (BRA)
  - Amanda Coneo (COL)
- Best Middle Blockers
  - Ivone Montaño (COL)
  - Valquiria Carboni (BRA)
- Best libero
  - Camila Gomez (COL)
