= 2017 FIVB Volleyball Women's U23 World Championship =

2017 FIVB Women's U23 World Championship
Svetovno Odbojkarsko Prvenstvo Za Ženske Do 23 Slovenija 2017

Tournament details
- Host country: Slovenia
- City: Ljubljana
- Dates: 10–17 September
- Teams: 12 (from 5 confederations)
- Venues: 2 (in 1 host city)

Final positions
- Champions: Turkey (1st title)
- Runners-up: Slovenia
- Third place: Bulgaria
- Fourth place: Dominican Republic

Tournament awards
- MVP: Hande Baladın (TUR)
- Best Setter: Eva Mori (SLO)
- Best OH: Hande Baladın (TUR); Madeline Guillén (DOM)
- Best MB: Beyza Arici (TUR); Saša Planinšec (SLO)
- Best OPP: Iza Mlakar (SLO)
- Best Libero: Zhana Todorova (BUL)

Tournament statistics
- Matches played: 34

The 2017 FIVB Volleyball Women's U23 World Championship was the third and final edition of the international volleyball tournament and the world championship for women's national teams under the age of 23, organized by the sport's world governing body, FIVB. The tournament was hosted by Slovenia in the city of Ljubljana from 10 September to 17 September 2017. 12 teams from the 5 confederations competed in the tournament.

Turkey defeated the home team in straight sets in the final to claim their first title in the competition. Bulgaria won the bronze medal outclassing Dominican Republic 4–2. Hande Baladın from Turkey was elected the MVP.

After this tournament, FIVB declared that "As per decision of May 2019 FIVB Board of Administration, the U23 WCH has been abolished."

== Qualification ==
The FIVB Sports Events Council revealed a proposal to streamline the number of teams participating in the Age Group World Championships.

| Means of Qualification | | Date | Venue | Vacancies | Qualifier |
|---|---|---|---|---|---|
| Host Nation | | 2 February 2016 | (Switzerland) Lausanne | 1 | Slovenia |
| 2016 European Qualifiers | | 27–31 July 2016 | (Serbia) Vrnjačka Banja | 2 | Turkey |
| 2016 European Qualifiers | | 27–31 July 2016 | (Serbia) Vrnjačka Banja | 2 | Bulgaria |
| 2016 South American Championship | | 27–31 July 2016 | (Peru) Lima | 1 | Brazil |
| 2016 Pan-American Cup | For CSV | 19–25 September 2016 | (Peru) Lima | 1 | Argentina |
| 2016 Pan-American Cup | For NORCECA | 19–25 September 2016 | (Peru) Lima | 2 | Dominican Republic |
| 2016 Pan-American Cup | For NORCECA | 19–25 September 2016 | (Peru) Lima | 2 | Cuba |
| 2016 African Championship | | 23–27 October 2016 | (Kenya) Kasarani | 2 | Egypt |
| 2016 African Championship | | 23–27 October 2016 | (Kenya) Kasarani | 2 | Kenya |
| 2017 Asian Championship | | 13–21 May 2017 | (Thailand) Nakhon Ratchasima | 2 | Japan |
| 2017 Asian Championship | | 13–21 May 2017 | (Thailand) Nakhon Ratchasima | 2 | Thailand |
| World Ranking | | As per 1 January 2017 | (Switzerland) Lausanne | 1 | China |
| Total | | | | 12 | |

== Pools composition ==
Teams were seeded following the Serpentine system according to their FIVB World Rankings as of January 2017. FIVB reserved the right to seed the hosts as head of pool A regardless of the U23 World Ranking. Rankings are shown in brackets except the hosts who ranked 10th.

| Pool A | Pool B |
|---|---|
| Slovenia (Hosts) | Brazil (1) |
| Dominican Republic (3) | Turkey (2) |
| China (4) | Japan (5) |
| Thailand (8) | Bulgaria (7) |
| Egypt (10) | Cuba (12) |
| Argentina (16) | Kenya (13) |

== Venues ==
| Pool A and Final round | Pool B |
|---|---|
Ljubljana, Slovenia
| Arena Stožice | Tivoli Hall |
| Capacity: 12,480 | Capacity: 4,000 |

== Testing of new rules ==
The 2017 FIVB Women's U23 World Championship will be a testing ground for a new scoring scheme currently under review by the FIVB, which, if successful, could mark a historical turning point for volleyball – much as the introduction of the Rally Scoring System did in the late 1990s.

Matches in Ljubljana will be played to best-of-seven sets with each set to 15 points (with at least a two-point difference needed). Three ranking points will be awarded to teams winning 4–0, 4–1 or 4–2. Two points go the winner of a 4–3 match with one point for the loser. It is hoped that the new scoring system will reduce overall duration of matches, while making each set more attractive and exciting – much as tie-breaks are under the current regulations. The interval between sets is reduced to two minutes (from three). Teams will switch ends after the second set - and also, if needed, after sets 4, 5 and 6. In addition, there will be no technical timeouts – just two regular thirty-second timeouts per team per set.

The basic principles for the new scheme were tested for the first time in the Dutch League in the 2016–17 season. Further testing of the scheme were conducted at the Women's U23 World Championship in Cairo. During and after the competition, players, coaches, referees and officials will be evaluating the new system through a questionnaire, while duration and scoring statistics will be gathered and analysed.

This is the second time that a U23 World Championship serves as a testbed for new regulations. Matches of the inaugural Men's U23 World Championship in 2013 in Uberlândia were played to 21-point sets. In addition to the scoring system, a new serving regulation will be tried out in Cairo, with the server not allowed to land inside the court after a jump service.

The testing of the new rules has been received with criticism from the volleyball community.

== Pool standing procedure ==
1. Number of matches won
2. Match points
3. Sets ratio
4. Points ratio
5. Result of the last match between the tied teams

Match won 4–0, 4–1 or 4–2: 3 match points for the winner, 0 match points for the loser
Match won 4–3: 2 match points for the winner, 1 match point for the loser

== Preliminary round ==
- All times are Central European Summer Time (UTC+02:00).

=== Pool A ===
| Pos | Team | Pld | W | L | Pts | SW | SL | SR | SPW | SPL | SPR | Qualification |
|---|---|---|---|---|---|---|---|---|---|---|---|---|
| 1 | Slovenia | 5 | 5 | 0 | 15 | 20 | 2 | 10.000 | 331 | 230 | 1.439 | Semifinals |
| 2 | Dominican Republic | 5 | 3 | 2 | 9 | 16 | 13 | 1.231 | 429 | 390 | 1.100 | Semifinals |
| 3 | China | 5 | 3 | 2 | 9 | 12 | 12 | 1.000 | 302 | 304 | 0.993 | 5th–8th semifinals |
| 4 | Thailand | 5 | 2 | 3 | 5 | 10 | 17 | 0.588 | 332 | 364 | 0.912 | 5th–8th semifinals |
| 5 | Egypt | 5 | 1 | 4 | 4 | 12 | 18 | 0.667 | 354 | 415 | 0.853 | |
| 6 | Argentina | 5 | 1 | 4 | 3 | 11 | 19 | 0.579 | 390 | 435 | 0.897 | |

| Date | Time | | Score | | Set 1 | Set 2 | Set 3 | Set 4 | Set 5 | Set 6 | Set 7 | Total | Report |
|---|---|---|---|---|---|---|---|---|---|---|---|---|---|
| 10 Sep | 14:00 | Dominican Republic | 4–2 | Egypt | 12–15 | 15–6 | 15–8 | 15–12 | 15–17 | 19–17 | | 91–75 | Report |
| 10 Sep | 17:00 | Slovenia | 4–0 | Argentina | 15–11 | 15–10 | 15–10 | 15–8 | | | | 60–39 | Report |
| 10 Sep | 20:00 | China | 4–0 | Thailand | 15–11 | 15–6 | 15–11 | 15–12 | | | | 60–40 | Report |
| 11 Sep | 14:00 | Thailand | 4–2 | Argentina | 11–15 | 15–5 | 15–10 | 15–12 | 13–15 | 15–10 | | 84–67 | Report |
| 11 Sep | 17:00 | China | 4–2 | Egypt | 10–15 | 15–11 | 12–15 | 15–10 | 15–7 | 15–7 | | 82–65 | Report |
| 11 Sep | 20:00 | Slovenia | 4–1 | Dominican Republic | 15–11 | 15–9 | 11–15 | 19–17 | 15–11 | | | 75–63 | Report |
| 12 Sep | 14:00 | Dominican Republic | 4–3 | Argentina | 21–23 | 12–15 | 15–12 | 17–15 | 16–14 | 20–22 | 15–5 | 116–106 | Report |
| 12 Sep | 17:00 | Slovenia | 4–0 | China | 15–11 | 15–12 | 15–5 | 15–8 | | | | 60–36 | Report |
| 12 Sep | 20:00 | Thailand | 2–4 | Egypt | 9–15 | 15–7 | 11–15 | 15–9 | 14–16 | 4–15 | | 68–77 | Report |
| 14 Sep | 14:00 | Egypt | 3–4 | Argentina | 10–15 | 6–15 | 14–16 | 16–14 | 15–13 | 15–11 | 11–15 | 87–99 | Report |
| 14 Sep | 17:00 | Slovenia | 4–0 | Thailand | 15–8 | 16–14 | 15–10 | 15–10 | | | | 61–42 | Report |
| 14 Sep | 20:00 | Dominican Republic | 4–0 | China | 15–10 | 15–13 | 15–3 | 15–10 | | | | 60–36 | Report |
| 15 Sep | 14:00 | China | 4–2 | Argentina | 11–15 | 13–15 | 15–8 | 15–11 | 18–16 | 16–14 | | 88–79 | Report |
| 15 Sep | 17:00 | Dominican Republic | 3–4 | Thailand | 15–9 | 15–12 | 12–15 | 15–11 | 12–15 | 11–15 | 19–21 | 99–98 | Report |
| 15 Sep | 20:00 | Slovenia | 4–1 | Egypt | 15–5 | 15–17 | 15–10 | 15–10 | 15–8 | | | 75–50 | Report |

=== Pool B ===
| Pos | Team | Pld | W | L | Pts | SW | SL | SR | SPW | SPL | SPR | Qualification |
|---|---|---|---|---|---|---|---|---|---|---|---|---|
| 1 | Turkey | 5 | 4 | 1 | 12 | 16 | 6 | 2.667 | 310 | 254 | 1.220 | Semifinals |
| 2 | Bulgaria | 5 | 4 | 1 | 11 | 17 | 9 | 1.889 | 358 | 292 | 1.226 | Semifinals |
| 3 | Brazil | 5 | 3 | 2 | 9 | 13 | 9 | 1.444 | 302 | 271 | 1.114 | 5th–8th semifinals |
| 4 | Cuba | 5 | 2 | 3 | 7 | 11 | 13 | 0.846 | 307 | 320 | 0.959 | 5th–8th semifinals |
| 5 | Japan | 5 | 2 | 3 | 6 | 12 | 12 | 1.000 | 313 | 306 | 1.023 | |
| 6 | Kenya | 5 | 0 | 5 | 0 | 0 | 20 | 0.000 | 153 | 300 | 0.510 | |

| Date | Time | | Score | | Set 1 | Set 2 | Set 3 | Set 4 | Set 5 | Set 6 | Set 7 | Total | Report |
|---|---|---|---|---|---|---|---|---|---|---|---|---|---|
| 10 Sep | 14:00 | Brazil | 4–0 | Kenya | 15–2 | 15–5 | 15–11 | 15–10 | | | | 60–28 | Report |
| 10 Sep | 17:00 | Turkey | 4–0 | Cuba | 15–12 | 16–14 | 17–15 | 15–8 | | | | 63–49 | Report |
| 10 Sep | 20:00 | Japan | 2–4 | Bulgaria | 13–15 | 15–13 | 15–11 | 13–15 | 12–15 | 11–15 | | 79–84 | Report |
| 11 Sep | 14:00 | Bulgaria | 4–0 | Kenya | 15–1 | 15–5 | 15–6 | 15–11 | | | | 60–23 | Report |
| 11 Sep | 17:00 | Japan | 4–0 | Cuba | 15–12 | 15–12 | 15–7 | 15–13 | | | | 60–44 | Report |
| 11 Sep | 20:00 | Brazil | 4–0 | Turkey | 17–15 | 15–12 | 15–6 | 15–12 | | | | 62–45 | Report |
| 12 Sep | 14:00 | Turkey | 4–0 | Kenya | 15–6 | 15–5 | 15–12 | 15–11 | | | | 60–34 | Report |
| 12 Sep | 17:00 | Brazil | 4–1 | Japan | 14–16 | 15–13 | 15–11 | 17–15 | 15–10 | | | 76–65 | Report |
| 12 Sep | 20:00 | Bulgaria | 4–3 | Cuba | 10–15 | 12–15 | 11–15 | 15–10 | 15–10 | 15–11 | 15–6 | 93–82 | Report |
| 14 Sep | 14:00 | Cuba | 4–0 | Kenya | 15–9 | 15–10 | 15–7 | 15–12 | | | | 60–38 | Report |
| 14 Sep | 17:00 | Brazil | 0–4 | Bulgaria | 10–15 | 5–15 | 14–16 | 9–15 | | | | 38–61 | Report |
| 14 Sep | 20:00 | Turkey | 4–1 | Japan | 15–12 | 15–5 | 15–9 | 12–15 | 15–8 | | | 72–49 | Report |
| 15 Sep | 14:00 | Japan | 4–0 | Kenya | 15–7 | 15–8 | 15–6 | 15–9 | | | | 60–30 | Report |
| 15 Sep | 17:00 | Turkey | 4–1 | Bulgaria | 15–9 | 15–12 | 15–11 | 10–15 | 15–13 | | | 70–60 | Report |
| 15 Sep | 20:00 | Brazil | 1–4 | Cuba | 12–15 | 15–9 | 10–15 | 15–17 | 14–16 | | | 66–72 | Report |

== Final round ==
- All times are Central European Summer Time (UTC+02:00).

=== 5th–8th places ===
5th–8th semifinals
16 September
China | 1
Cuba | 4
16 September
Brazil | 4
Thailand | 0

5th place match
17 September
Cuba | 0
Brazil | 4
7th place match
17 September
China | 4
Thailand | 2

==== 5th–8th semifinals ====
| Date | Time | | Score | | Set 1 | Set 2 | Set 3 | Set 4 | Set 5 | Set 6 | Set 7 | Total | Report |
|---|---|---|---|---|---|---|---|---|---|---|---|---|---|
| 16 Sep | 15:30 | China | 1–4 | Cuba | 14–16 | 15–6 | 10–15 | 10–15 | 16–18 | | | 65–70 | Report |
| 16 Sep | 18:30 | Brazil | 4–0 | Thailand | 18–16 | 16–14 | 15–10 | 15–7 | | | | 64–47 | Report |

==== 7th place match ====
| Date | Time | | Score | | Set 1 | Set 2 | Set 3 | Set 4 | Set 5 | Set 6 | Set 7 | Total | Report |
|---|---|---|---|---|---|---|---|---|---|---|---|---|---|
| 17 Sep | 14:00 | China | 4–2 | Thailand | 14–16 | 12–15 | 15–4 | 16–14 | 15–3 | 19–17 | | 91–69 | Report |

==== 5th place match ====
| Date | Time | | Score | | Set 1 | Set 2 | Set 3 | Set 4 | Set 5 | Set 6 | Set 7 | Total | Report |
|---|---|---|---|---|---|---|---|---|---|---|---|---|---|
| 17 Sep | 16:00 | Cuba | 0–4 | Brazil | 12–15 | 6–15 | 8–15 | 13–15 | | | | 39–60 | Report |

=== Final four ===
Semifinals
16 September
Turkey | 4
Dominican Republic | 3
16 September
Slovenia | 4
Bulgaria | 1

Final
17 September
Turkey | 4
Slovenia | 0
3rd place match
17 September
Dominican Republic | 2
Bulgaria | 4

==== Semifinals ====
| Date | Time | | Score | | Set 1 | Set 2 | Set 3 | Set 4 | Set 5 | Set 6 | Set 7 | Total | Report |
|---|---|---|---|---|---|---|---|---|---|---|---|---|---|
| 16 Sep | 15:30 | Slovenia | 4–1 | Bulgaria | 11–15 | 15–10 | 15–12 | 18–16 | 15–4 | | | 74–57 | Report |
| 16 Sep | 18:30 | Turkey | 4–3 | Dominican Republic | 11–15 | 16–14 | 11–15 | 13–15 | 15–7 | 16–14 | 15–8 | 97–88 | Report |

==== 3rd place match ====
| Date | Time | | Score | | Set 1 | Set 2 | Set 3 | Set 4 | Set 5 | Set 6 | Set 7 | Total | Report |
|---|---|---|---|---|---|---|---|---|---|---|---|---|---|
| 17 Sep | 16:30 | Dominican Republic | 2–4 | Bulgaria | 15–12 | 8–15 | 11–15 | 18–16 | 11–15 | 9–15 | | 72–88 | Report |

==== Final ====
| Date | Time | | Score | | Set 1 | Set 2 | Set 3 | Set 4 | Set 5 | Set 6 | Set 7 | Total | Report |
|---|---|---|---|---|---|---|---|---|---|---|---|---|---|
| 17 Sep | 19:00 | Turkey | 4–0 | Slovenia | 15–12 | 15–11 | 15–13 | 15–8 | | | | 60–44 | Report |

== Final standing ==
| Rank | Team |
|---|---|
| 1st place, gold medalist(s) | Turkey |
| 2nd place, silver medalist(s) | Slovenia |
| 3rd place, bronze medalist(s) | Bulgaria |
| 4 | Dominican Republic |
| 5 | Brazil |
| 6 | Cuba |
| 7 | China |
| 8 | Thailand |
| 9 | Egypt |
| 9 | Japan |
| 11 | Argentina |
| 11 | Kenya |

2017 Women's U23 World champions

Turkey
1st title

12–woman roster
Tuğba Senoğlu, Beyza Arici, Ayça Aykaç, Çağla Akın (c), Aslı Kalaç, Ezgi Dilik, Bihter Dumanoğlu, Hande Baladın, Saliha Şahin, Nursevil Aydinlar, Zehra Güneş, Ebrar Karakurt
Head coach
Ataman Guneyligil

== Awards ==
- Most valuable player
  (Turkey) Hande Baladın
- Best setter
  (Slovenia) Eva Mori
- Best outside spikers
  (Turkey) Hande Baladın
  (Dominican Republic) Madeline Guillén
- Best middle blockers
  (Turkey) Beyza Arici
  (Slovenia) Saša Planinšec
- Best opposite spiker
  (Slovenia) Iza Mlakar
- Best libero
  (Bulgaria) Zhana Todorova

== See also ==
- 2017 FIVB Volleyball Men's U23 World Championship
