= Volleyball at the 2013 Bolivarian Games – Women's tournament =

The Women's tournament of volleyball at the 2013 Bolivarian Games in Trujillo, Peru begun on November 24 and ended on November 29. All games were held at the Coliseo Gran Chimu. The defending champions, Peru, won their competitions's sixth title.

== Teams ==
Women
- Bolivia
- Colombia
- Guatemala
- Peru
- Venezuela

== Round-Robyn ==
Pos	Team	Pld	W	L	Pts	SW	SL	SR	SPW	SPL	SPR
1	Peru	4	4	0	12	12	0	MAX	300	161	1.863
2	Venezuela	4	3	1	9	9	3	3.000	273	212	1.288
3	Colombia	4	2	2	6	6	6	1.000	241	251	0.960
4	Guatemala	4	1	3	3	3	10	0.300	226	309	0.731
5	Bolivia	4	0	4	0	1	12	0.083	198	326	0.607

=== Match results ===
Date		Score		Set 1	Set 2	Set 3	Set 4	Set 5	Total
25 Nov	Venezuela	3–0	Bolivia	25–13	25–15	25–9			75–37
25 Nov	Peru	3–0	Guatemala	25–11	25–8	25–17			75–36
26 Nov	Guatemala	0–3	Colombia	16–25	8–25	16–25			40–75
26 Nov	Bolivia	0–3	Peru	13–25	14–25	11–25			38–75
27 Nov	Guatemala	3–1	Bolivia	25–21	25–18	26–28	25–17		101–84
27 Nov	Colombia	0–3	Venezuela	23–25	9–25	19–25			51–75
28 Nov	Venezuela	3–0	Guatemala	25–10	25–19	25–20			75–49
28 Nov	Peru	3–0	Colombia	25–11	25–11	25–18			75–40
29 Nov	Colombia	3–0	Bolivia	25–16	25–11	25–14			75–41
29 Nov	Venezuela	0–3	Peru	21–25	17–25	10–25			48–75

== Final standings ==
Rank	Team
1st place, gold medalist(s)	Peru
2nd place, silver medalist(s)	Venezuela
3rd place, bronze medalist(s)	Colombia
4.	Guatemala
5.	Bolivia

2013 Women's Bolivarian champions

Peru
6th title

== All-Star team ==
- Most valuable player
  - Karla Ortiz (PER)
- Best opposite
  - Raffaella Camet (PER)
- Best outside hitters
  - María José Pérez (VEN)
  - Ángela Leyva (PER)
- Best setter
  - Alexandra Muñoz (PER)
- Best middle blockers
  - Aleoscar Blanco (VEN)
  - Clarivett Yllescas (PER)
- Best libero
  - María de Fátima Acosta (PER)

== Medalists ==
Gold	Silver	Bronze
Peru Ángela Leyva; Mabel Olemar; Alexandra Muñoz; Maguilaura Frias; Grecia Herrada; Shiamara Almeida; Andrea Urrutia; Luciana Del Valle; Raffaella Camet; Clarivett Yllescas; María de Fátima Acosta; Karla Ortiz	Venezuela Yessica Paz; Luz Delfines; Génesis Francesco; Naimir García; Ahizar Zuniaga; Leyna Morillo; Yorohanny Tovar; Desiree Glod; Mariangel Pérez; Aleoscar Blanco; María José Pérez; Isis Francesco	Colombia Paola Ampudia; Paula Cortes; Amanda Coneo; Yuranny Romaña; Angie Vente; Mery Mancilla; Martha Nieva; Verónica Pasos; María Marín; Melisa Rangel; Cindy Ramírez; Juliana Toro
