= 2014–15 Liga Nacional Superior de Voleibol Femenino =

Liga Nacional Superior de Voleibol Femenino
- Association: FPV
- League: Liga Peruana de Vóley Femenino
- Sport: Volleyball
- Duration: November 28, 2014 to April 18, 2015
- Teams: 12
- Relegated: Latino Amisa
- Finals champions: Universidad San Martín (2nd title)
- Runners-up: Géminis

Seasons
- ← 2013–14 2015–16 →

The 2014–15 Liga Nacional Superior de Voleibol Femenino (Spanish for: 2014–15 Women's Senior National Volleyball League) or 2014–15 LNSVF was the 13th official season of the Peruvian Volleyball League. The defending champion, Universidad San Martín, reclaimed the league title championship defeating Géminis in the finals.

For the current season, Deportivo Wanka changed its name to Club Jaamsa.

== Teams ==
=== Competing teams ===
Club	Manager
Alianza Lima	(Peru) Carlos Aparicio
Circolo Sportivo Italiano	(Peru) Edwin Jiménez
Divino Maestro	(Peru) Guillermo González López
Géminis	(Peru) Martin Escudero
Jaamsa	(Peru) Andrés Rodríguez
Latino Amisa	(Peru) Jorge Reyes
Regatas Lima	(Spain) Francisco Hervás
Sport Loreto	(Peru) Fernando Caloggero
Sporting Cristal	(Peru) Walter Lung
Túpac Amaru	(Peru) José Castillo
Universidad César Vallejo	(Peru) Natalia Málaga
Universidad San Martín	(Spain) Juan D. García

== First stage ==
The first round is a Round-Robin system where all 12 teams will play once against the other 11.

Pool standing procedure

1. Match points
2. Numbers of matches won
3. Sets ratio
4. Points ratio

Match won 3–0 or 3–1: 3 match points for the winner, 0 match points for the loser
Match won 3–2: 2 match points for the winner, 1 match point for the loser

Ranking

Pos	Team	Pld	W	L	Pts	SPW	SPL	SPR	SW	SL	SR	Qualification
1	Géminis	11	10	1	30	929	751	1.237	32	8	4.000	Second Stage
2	Universidad César Vallejo	11	10	1	27	996	772	1.290	31	10	3.100	Second Stage
3	Universidad San Martín	11	8	3	26	931	689	1.351	29	10	2.900	Second Stage
4	Regatas Lima	11	8	3	25	947	850	1.114	28	14	2.000	Second Stage
5	Sporting Cristal	11	7	4	21	840	724	1.160	24	13	1.846	Second Stage
6	Alianza Lima	11	7	4	21	898	847	1.060	24	16	1.500	Second Stage
7	Jaamsa	11	6	5	18	782	778	1.005	22	18	1.222	Second Stage
8	Túpac Amaru	11	4	7	11	741	801	0.925	15	30	0.500	Second Stage
9	Circolo Sportivo Italiano	11	3	8	9	721	842	0.856	12	25	0.480	
10	Divino Maestro	11	2	9	6	666	828	0.804	8	27	0.296	
11	Sport Loreto	11	1	10	4	678	858	0.790	6	30	0.200	
12	Latino Amisa	11	0	11	0	427	825	0.518	0	33	0.000	

=== Results ===
==== First Round, November 28 - February 01 ====
The first round consisted of 40 matches, with an average of six matches per week. Teams played seven matches during this round except for four teams that only played six.

Date		Score		Set 1	Set 2	Set 3	Set 4	Set 5	Total	Report
28 Nov	Universidad César Vallejo	3–0	Latino Amisa	25–10	25–8	25–6			75–24	P2 P3
28 Nov	Alianza Lima	3–1	Jaamsa	25–15	22–25	25–20	25–17		97–77	P2 P3
30 Nov	Regatas Lima	3-1	Circolo Sportivo Italiano	22-25	26-24	25-16	25-21		98-86	P2 P3
30 Nov	Géminis	3-0	Túpac Amaru	25-12	25-20	25-12			75-44	P2 P3
03 Dec	Jaamsa	3-2	Universidad San Martín	18-25	26-24	25-23	19-25	15-13	103-110	P2 P3
03 Dec	Sporting Cristal	3-0	Divino Maestro	25-10	25-9	25-17			75-36	P2 P3
05 Dec	Universidad César Vallejo	3-0	Jaamsa	25-14	25-20	25-19			75-53	P2 P3
05 Dec	Alianza Lima	3-1	Circolo Sportivo Italiano	20-25	25-19	25-21	25-13		95-78	P2 P3
07 Dec	Universidad San Martín	3-0	Divino Maestro	25-11	25-10	25-7			75-28	P2 P3
07 Dec	Sporting Cristal	3-0	Túpac Amaru	25-21	25-22	25-17			75-60	P2 P3
10 Dec	Géminis	3-2	Regatas Lima	17-25	25-20	25-12	15-25	15-9	97-91	P2 P3
10 Dec	Universidad San Martín	3-0	Latino Amisa	25-10	25-8	25-12			75-30	P2 P3
12 Dec	Túpac Amaru	3-0	Divino Maestro	25-15	25-22	25-15			75-52	P2 P3
12 Dec	Universidad César Vallejo	3-0	Circolo Sportivo Italiano	25-16	25-7	25-13			75-36	P2 P3
14 Dec	Regatas Lima	3-1	Sporting Cristal	25-19	25-23	21-25	25-21		96-88	P2 P3
14 Dec	Géminis	3-1	Alianza Lima	25-22	25-21	22-25	25-22		97-90	P2 P3
07 Jan	Jaamsa	3-0	Latino Amisa	25-8	25-9	25-15			75-32	P2 P3
07 Jan	Sporting Cristal	3-1	Alianza Lima	25-11	25-27	25-16	25-12		100-66	P2 P3
08 Jan	Universidad San Martín	3-0	Sport Loreto	25-16	25-17	25-20			75-53	P2 P3
08 Jan	Regatas Lima	3-0	Divino Maestro	25-20	25-17	25-17			75-54	P2 P3
09 Jan	Sport Loreto	3-0	Latino Amisa	25-11	25-14	25-23			75-48	P2P3
09 Jan	Universidad César Vallejo	3-2	Géminis	25-15	23-25	26-28	25-20	15-11	116-98	P2P3
10 Jan	Circolo Sportivo Italiano	3-0	Latino Amisa	25-16	25-14	25-16			75-46	P2P3
10 Jan	Jaamsa	3-1	Sport Loreto	25-17	23-25	25-18	25-12		98-72	P2P3
10 Jan	Alianza Lima	3-1	Divino Maestro	20-25	25-21	25-18	25-14		95-78	P2P3
10 Jan	Universidad San Martín	3-0	Túpac Amaru	25-21	25-13	25-10			75-44	P2P3
11 Jan	Circolo Sportivo Italiano	3-0	Sport Loreto	25-21	25-16	25-22			75-59	P2P3
11 Jan	Regatas Lima	3-0	Túpac Amaru	25-21	29-27	25-23			79-71	P2P3
11 Jan	Géminis	3-0	Divino Maestro	25-18	25-21	25-16			75-55	P2P3
11 Jan	Universidad César Vallejo	3-1	Sporting Cristal	25-16	25-21	26-28	25-15		101-80	P2P3
14 Jan	Géminis	3-0	Latino Amisa	25-19	25-17	25-21			75-57	P2P3
14 Jan	Alianza Lima	3-0	Túpac Amaru	25-19	25-17	25-21			75-57	P2P3
15 Jan	Sporting Cristal	3-0	Sport Loreto	25-16	25-20	26-24			76-60	P2P3
15 Jan	Túpac Amaru	3-0	Latino Amisa	25-12	25-16	25-13			75-41	P2P3
16 Jan	Alianza Lima	3-0	Sport Loreto	25-11	25-17	26-24			76-52	P2P3
16 Jan	Universidad San Martín	3-0	Regatas Lima	25-20	25-10	25-20			75-50	P2P3
17 Jan	Circolo Sportivo Italiano	3-1	Divino Maestro	21-25	26-24	25-11	25-19		97-79	P2P3
17 Jan	Géminis	3-0	Sport Loreto	25-12	25-17	25-11			75-40	P2P3
17 Jan	Universidad César Vallejo	3-2	Regatas Lima	22-25	25-22	26-24	17-25	21-19	111-115	P2P3
17 Jan	Sporting Cristal	3-0	Jaamsa	25-17	25-21	25-15			75-53	P2P3
18 Jan	Túpac Amaru	3-2	Sport Loreto	25-22	23-25	25-22	22-25	15-12	110-106	P2P3
18 Jan	Universidad San Martín	3-0	Circolo Sportivo Italiano	25-23	25-17	25-14			75-54	P2P3
18 Jan	Universidad César Vallejo	3-0	Divino Maestro	25-17	25-23	27-25			77-65	P2P3
18 Jan	Sporting Cristal	3-0	Latino Amisa	25-13	25-10	25-20			75-43	P2P3
21 Jan	Sporting Cristal	3-0	Circolo Sportivo Italiano	25-13	25-12	25-13			75-38	P2P3
21 Jan	Universidad San Martín	3-0	Alianza Lima	25-19	25-19	25-10			75-48	P2P3
23 Jan	Regatas Lima	3-0	Sport Loreto	25-18	25-19	25-14			75-51	P2P3
23 Jan	Géminis	3-1	Jaamsa	25-13	21-25	25-19	25-23		96-80	P2P3
24 Jan	Divino Maestro	3-0	Sport Loreto	25-23	25-23	25-22			75-68	P2P3
24 Jan	Universidad César Vallejo	3-2	Universidad San Martín	21-25	23-25	28-26	25-21	17-15	114-112	P2P3
24 Jan	Jaamsa	3-0	Túpac Amaru	26-24	25-16	25-22			76-62	P2P3
25 Jan	Divino Maestro	3-0	Latino Amisa	25-12	25-17	25-11			75-40	P2P3
25 Jan	Universidad César Vallejo	3-0	Sport Loreto	25-15	25-13	25-10			75-38	P2P3
25 Jan	Géminis	3-0	Sporting Cristal	25-14	25-19	25-16			75-49	P2P3
25 Jan	Regatas Lima	3-1	Alianza Lima	25-21	15-25	26-24	25-14		91-84	P2P3
28 Jan	Universidad César Vallejo	3-0	Túpac Amaru	25-10	25-21	25-22			75-53	P2P3
28 Jan	Géminis	3-1	Universidad San Martín	25-22	25-19	15-25	25-22		90-88	P2P3
30 Jan	Jaamsa	3-0	Circolo Sportivo Italiano	25-16	25-16	25-17			75-49	P2P3
30 Jan	Alianza Lima	3-1	Universidad César Vallejo	31-29	15-25	25-23	26-24		97-101	P2P3
31 Jan	Alianza Lima	3-0	Latino Amisa	25-9	25-20	25-9			75-38	P2P3
31 Jan	Regatas Lima	3-2	Jaamsa	25-12	17-25	25-19	20-25	15-11	102-92	P2P3
31 Jan	Túpac Amaru	3-1	Circolo Sportivo Italiano	25-15	25-13	15-25	25-19		90-72	P2P3
31 Jan	Universidad San Martín	3-1	Sporting Cristal	21-25	25-11	25-15	25-21		96-72	P2P3
01 Feb	Jaamsa	3-0	Divino Maestro	26-24	25-22	25-23			76-69	P2P3
01 Feb	Regatas Lima	3-0	Latino Amisa	25-12	25-15	25-14			75-41	P2P3
01 Feb	Géminis	3-0	Circolo Sportivo Italiano	25-21	25-23	25-16			75-60	P2P3

== Second stage ==
The second round of the tournament will see the best 8 teams from the first round compete in another Round-Robyn system, according to the finishing will be the play-offs. It began February 11, 2015 .

Pool standing procedure

1. Match points
2. Numbers of matches won
3. Sets ratio
4. Points ratio

Match won 3–0 or 3–1: 3 match points for the winner, 0 match points for the loser
Match won 3–2: 2 match points for the winner, 1 match point for the loser

Ranking

Pos	Team	Pld	W	L	Pts	SPW	SPL	SPR	SW	SL	SR	Qualification
1	Universidad San Martín	7	6	1	18	549	471	1.166	19	4	4.750	Quarterfinals
2	Géminis	7	5	2	15	638	570	1.119	18	10	1.800	Quarterfinals
3	Universidad César Vallejo	7	5	2	14	534	469	1.139	15	9	1.667	Quarterfinals
4	Regatas Lima	7	4	3	11	606	606	1.000	15	14	1.071	Quarterfinals
5	Alianza Lima	7	4	3	11	520	523	0.994	12	12	1.000	Quarterfinals
6	Sporting Cristal	7	3	4	10	677	647	1.046	16	16	1.000	Quarterfinals
7	Túpac Amaru	7	1	6	3	472	605	0.780	6	20	0.300	Quarterfinals
8	Jaamsa	7	0	7	2	508	613	0.829	5	21	0.238	Quarterfinals

=== Second Round, February 11 - March 15 ===
The second round consisted of 28 matches, with an average of six matches per week. Teams played seven matches during this round except for four teams that only played six.

Date		Score		Set 1	Set 2	Set 3	Set 4	Set 5	Total	Report
11 Feb	Géminis	3–1	Túpac Amaru	20–25	27–25	25–20	25–14		97–84	P2 P3
11 Feb	Universidad César Vallejo	3–0	Jaamsa	25–19	25–13	25–19			75–51	P2 P3
13 Feb	Regatas Lima	3–2	Sporting Cristal	14–25	22–25	25–18	25–23	15–12	101–103	P2 P3
13 Feb	Universidad San Martín	3–0	Alianza Lima	25–18	26–24	27–25			78–67	P2 P3
14 Feb	Alianza Lima	3–0	Túpac Amaru	25–17	25–11	25–13			75–41	P2 P3
14 Feb	Géminis	3–0	Jaamsa	25–20	25–21	25–14			75–55	P2 P3
15 Feb	Sporting Cristal	3–0	Universidad César Vallejo	25–11	25–12	25–21			75–45	P2 P3
15 Feb	Universidad San Martín	3–0	Regatas Lima	25–20	25–16	25–19			75–55	P2 P3
20 Feb	Sporting Cristal	3–2	Jaamsa	27–25	25–10	14–25	22–25	16–14	104–99	P2 P3
20 Feb	Géminis	3–0	Alianza Lima	25–19	26–24	25–20			76–63	P2 P3
28 Feb	Regatas Lima	3–0	Túpac Amaru	25–12	25–13	25–23			75–48	P2 P3
28 Feb	Universidad San Martín	3–0	Universidad César Vallejo	25–19	28–26	25–22			78–67	P2 P3
04 Mar	Alianza Lima	3–1	Regatas Lima	19–25	25–20	25–20	25–18		94–83	P2 P3
04 Mar	Géminis	3–2	Sporting Cristal	23–25	25–27	25–20	25–20	15–13	113–105	P2 P3
06 Mar	Universidad César Vallejo	3–0	Túpac Amaru	25–18	25–15	25–13			75–46	P2 P3
06 Mar	Universidad San Martín	3–0	Jaamsa	25–20	25–17	25–17			75–54	P2 P3
07 Mar	Túpac Amaru	3–2	Jaamsa	22–25	25–17	23–25	25–21	16–14	111–102	P2 P3
07 Mar	Regatas Lima	3–2	Géminis	16–25	25–23	17–25	25–20	15–08	98–101	P2 P3
08 Mar	Universidad César Vallejo	3–0	Alianza Lima	25–17	25–14	25–15			75–46	P2 P3
08 Mar	Universidad San Martín	3–1	Sporting Cristal	25–21	25–13	23–25	25–20		98–79	P2 P3
11 Mar	Alianza Lima	3–0	Jaamsa	25–22	25–20	25–23			75–65	P2 P3
11 Mar	Universidad César Vallejo	3–2	Regatas Lima	25–17	25–27	13–25	25–20	15–07	103–96	P2 P3
13 Mar	Sporting Cristal	3–2	Túpac Amaru	20–25	25–15	21–25	25–16	15–11	106–92	P2 P3
13 Mar	Géminis	3–1	Universidad San Martín	24–26	25–10	25–13	25–21		99–70	P2 P3
14 Mar	Regatas Lima	3–1	Jaamsa	25–17	25–22	23–25	25–18		98–82	P2 P3
14 Mar	Alianza Lima	3–2	Sporting Cristal	25–15	11–25	30–28	19–25	15–12	100–105	P2 P3
15 Mar	Universidad San Martín	3–0	Túpac Amaru	25–11	25–20	25–19			75–50	P2 P3
15 Mar	Universidad César Vallejo	3–1	Géminis	25–20	16–25	25–17	25–19		91–82	P2 P3

== Final round ==
The final round of the tournament is a knockout stage, teams play the quarterfinals seeded according to how they finished ranking-wise in the second round. The Final Round will begin March 27, 2015 and it is expected to crown the champion team ?. This round is played best-out-of-three games, for a team to move on to the next stage, they have to win twice against the opposite team.

Quarterfinals
Universidad César Vallejo	2
Sporting Cristal	0
Géminis	2
Túpac Amaru	0
Universidad San Martín	2
Jaamsa	0
Regatas Lima	2
Alianza Lima	1

Semifinals
Universidad César Vallejo	0
Géminis	1
Universidad San Martín	2
Regatas Lima	0

Gold medal match
Universidad San Martín	1
Géminis	0
Bronze medal match
Regatas Lima	1
Universidad César Vallejo	0

=== Quarterfinals ===
Team 1	Agg.	Team 2	1st leg	2nd leg
Universidad César Vallejo	2–0	Sporting Cristal	3–2	3–1
Géminis	2–0	Túpac Amaru	3–0	3–0
Universidad San Martín	2–0	Jaamsa	3–0	3–0
Regatas Lima	2–1	Alianza Lima	3–1	2–3

^{1}Regatas Lima won third leg 3-0 (25–20 27–25 25–23).

==== First leg ====
Date		Score		Set 1	Set 2	Set 3	Set 4	Set 5	Total
27 Mar	Universidad San Martín	3–0	Jaamsa	25–21	25–19	25–8			75–48
27 Mar	Universidad César Vallejo	3–2	Sporting Cristal	25–17	20–25	25–22	29–31	15–12	114–107
29 Mar	Géminis	3–0	Túpac Amaru	25–22	25–13	25–22			75–57
29 Mar	Regatas Lima	3–1	Alianza Lima	25–23	25–16	21–25	25–23		96–87

==== Second leg ====
Date		Score		Set 1	Set 2	Set 3	Set 4	Set 5	Total
01 Apr	Universidad San Martín	3–0	Jaamsa	25–18	25–15	25–19			75–52
01 Apr	Universidad César Vallejo	3–1	Sporting Cristal	25–10	20–25	25–17	25–19		95–71
03 Apr	Géminis	3–0	Túpac Amaru	25–9	25–15	25–20			75–44
03 Apr	Regatas Lima	2–3	Alianza Lima	23–25	15–25	25–23	28–26	12–15	101–114

=== Semifinals ===
Team 1	Agg.	Team 2	1st leg	2nd leg
Universidad César Vallejo	0–2	Géminis	0–3	1–3
Universidad San Martín	2–0	Regatas Lima	3–0	3–0

==== First leg ====
Date		Score		Set 1	Set 2	Set 3	Set 4	Set 5	Total
10 Apr	Universidad San Martín	3–0	Regatas Lima	25–18	25–15	26–24			76–57
10 Apr	Universidad César Vallejo	0–3	Géminis	20–25	21–25	20–25			61–75

==== Second leg ====
Date		Score		Set 1	Set 2	Set 3	Set 4	Set 5	Total
11 Apr	Universidad San Martín	3–0	Regatas Lima	25–22	25–13	25–21			75–56
11 Apr	Universidad César Vallejo	1–3	Géminis	23–25	21–25	25–14	19–25		88–89

=== Bronze Medal Matches ===
Team 1	Agg.	Team 2	1st leg	2nd leg
Regatas Lima	1–1	Universidad César Vallejo	3–2	2–3

^{1}César Vallejo won third leg 3-0 (25–21 25–18 25–21).

==== First leg ====
Date		Score		Set 1	Set 2	Set 3	Set 4	Set 5	Total	Report
17 Abr	Regatas Lima	3–2	Universidad César Vallejo	23–25	25–19	17–25	25–20	15–10	105–99	

==== Second leg ====
Date		Score		Set 1	Set 2	Set 3	Set 4	Set 5	Total	Report
18 Abr	Regatas Lima	2–3	Universidad César Vallejo	33–31	22–25	16–25	25–23	10–15	106–119	

=== Gold Medal Matches ===
Team 1	Agg.	Team 2	1st leg	2nd leg
Universidad San Martín	2–0	Géminis	3–0	3–1

==== First leg ====
Date		Score		Set 1	Set 2	Set 3	Set 4	Set 5	Total	Report
17 Abr	Universidad San Martín	3–0	Géminis	27–25	25–15	25–20			77–60	

==== Second leg ====
Date		Score		Set 1	Set 2	Set 3	Set 4	Set 5	Total	Report
18 Abr	Universidad San Martín	3–1	Géminis	24–26	25–21	25–22	25–23		99–92	

== Final standing ==
Rank	Team
1st place, gold medalist(s)	Universidad San Martín
2nd place, silver medalist(s)	Géminis
3rd place, bronze medalist(s)	Universidad César Vallejo
4	Regatas Lima
5	Alianza Lima
6	Sporting Cristal
7	Túpac Amaru
8	Jaamsa
9	Circolo Sportivo Italiano
10	Divino Maestro
11	Sport Loreto
12	Latino Amisa

Team qualified for the 2016 South American Club Championship
Team lost A1 category

2014–15 Liga Nacional Superior de Voleibol ;

Universidad San Martín
2nd title

Team Roster:

Daniela Uribe, Sabel Moffett, Milca Da Silva, Leslie Leyva, Andrea Urrutia, Elizabeth Millan, Zoila La Rosa, Julissa Asca, Ángela Leyva (C), Maguilaura Frias, Valentina Carrasco (L), Janice Torres (L)

Head Coach: Juan Diego García

== Individual awards ==
- Most valuable player
  - (Dominican Republic) Cindy Rondón (Géminis)
- Best scorer
  - (Dominican Republic) Cindy Rondón (Géminis)
- Best Middle-Blockers
  - (United States) Sabel Moffett (Universidad San Martín)
  - (Peru) Andrea Urrutia (Universidad San Martín)
- Best Opposite
  - (Peru) Maguilaura Frias (Universidad San Martín)
- Best setter
  - (Spain) Patricia Aranda (Géminis)
- Best Outside Hitters
  - (Peru) Ángela Leyva (Universidad San Martín)
  - (Dominican Republic) Cindy Rondón (Géminis)
- Best libero
  - (Peru) María de Fátima Acosta (Géminis)
- Best server
  - (Peru) Shiamara Almeida (Sporting Cristal)
