= Katherine Regalado =

Peruvian volleyball player

Personal information
- Born: March 11, 1998 (age 28); Lima, Peru
- Height: 1.90 m (6 ft 3 in)
- Weight: 66 kg (146 lb)

Volleyball information
- Position: Opposite
- Current club: Sporting Clube de Portugal
- Number: 3

National team
2013–2015	U-18 Peru
2014–2017	U-20 Peru
2015–present	Peru
Honours
Women's volleyball
Representing Peru
Bolivarian Games
Silver medal – second place	2017 Santa Marta	Team
South American Child Championship
Bronze medal – third place	2013 Popayán	Team
South American Youth Championship
Bronze medal – third place	2014 Tarapoto	Team
South American Junior Championship
Silver medal – second place	2014 Barrancabermeja	Team
South American U22 Championship
Bronze medal – third place	2014 Popayán	Team

Katherine Regalado (born March 11, 1998) is a Peruvian volleyball player, who plays as an opposite. She was a member of the Women's National Team. She plays for Alianza Lima.

== Career ==
=== 2014 ===
Regalado played at the 2014 South American U18 Championship in Peru. Regalado was chosen the best opposite of championship.

She further played at the South American U22 Championship in Colombia, at the Pan-American U23 Cup in Peru, and at the South American U20 Championship in Colombia.

=== 2017 ===
She won the silver medal in the 2017 Bolivarian Games under 23 tournament.

== Clubs ==
- (Peru) Alianza Lima (2013–2016)
- (Peru) Géminis (2016–2018)
- (Peru) Jaamsa (2018–2020)
- (Peru) Circolo Sportivo Italiano (2020–2021)
- Sporting Clube de Portugal (2021–2022)

== Awards ==
=== Individuals ===
- 2014 South American Youth Championship "Best Opposite"
