= Maguilaura Frias =

Peruvian volleyball player (born 1997)

Personal information
- Full name: Maguilaura Dessire Frias Pomiano
- Born: May 28, 1997 (age 29); Lima, Peru
- Hometown: Lima
- Height: 1.81 m (5 ft 11 1/2 in) cm
- Weight: 71 kg (157 lb)
- Spike: 300 cm (118 in)
- Block: 299 cm (118 in)

Volleyball information
- Position: Outside hitter/Opposite
- Current club: CAV Esquimo Dos Hermanas
- Number: 8

National team
2011; 2012–2013; 2012–2015; 2013–present	U-16 Peru; U-18 Peru; U-20 Peru; Peru
Honours
Women's Volleyball
Representing Peru
Bolivarian Games
Gold medal – first place	2013 Trujillo	Team
Silver medal – second place	2017 Santa Marta	Team
Junior S. American Championship
Silver medal – second place	2012 Lima	Team
Youth S. American Championship
Gold medal – first place	2012 Callao	Team
U16 S. American Championship
Silver medal – second place	2011 Canelones	Team
- Last updated: May 2014

Maguilaura Dessire Frias Pomiano (born May 28, 1997) is a peruvian volleyball player who plays for the Peru national team. Maguilaura was part of the team that won gold at the 2012 Youth South American Championship, the first gold medal for Peruvian volleyball in that category after 32 years and the first gold in any category in 19 years. She was born in Lima.

== Career ==
Frias was transferred from Sporting Cristal to Universidad San Martin for the 2015/16 season. She won the silver medal in the 2017 Bolivarian Games under 23 tournament.

== Clubs ==
- (Peru) Sporting Cristal (2011–2014)
- (Peru) Universidad San Martin (2015–2020)
- (Turkey) Turkuaz Seramik OSB Teknik Koleji Gençlik (2020 - 2021)
- (Spain) CAV Esquimo Dos Hermanas (2021 - )

== Awards ==
=== Individuals ===
- 2013–14 Liga Nacional Superior de Voleibol "Best spiker"
- 2013–14 Liga Nacional Superior de Voleibol "Best opposite"
- 2014 Junior South American Championship "Best opposite"
- 2014–15 Liga Nacional Superior de Voleibol Femenino "Best opposite"
- 2015 Copa Latina U20 "Best outside spiker"
- 2015 Copa Latina U20 "Best receiver"

=== National team ===
- 2013 Bolivarian Games – Gold Medal

==== Junior team ====
- 2011 U16 South American Championship – Silver Medal
- 2012 Junior South American Championship – Silver Medal
- 2012 Youth South American Championship – Gold Medal
- 2014 Junior South American Championship – Silver Medal
- 2014 Junior Final Four Cup – Gold Medal
