= Ángela Leyva =

Peruvian volleyball player

Angela Leyva
Personal information
- Full name: María Angela Leyva Tagle
- Born: November 22, 1996 (age 29) Lima, Peru
- Home town: Lima
- Height: 180–184 cm (5 ft 11 in – 6 ft 0 in)
- Weight: 70 kg (154 lb)
- Spike: 312 cm (123 in)
- Block: 300 cm (118 in)

Volleyball information
- Position: Wing spiker
- Current club: (Greece) A.E.K. Athens
- Number: 1

National team
- Years: Team
- 2010–2011: U-16 Peru
- 2011–2013: U-18 Peru
- 2012–2015: U-20 Peru
- 2010–present: Peru
Honours
Women's volleyball
Representing Peru
South American Championship
Silver medal – second place	2015 Cartagena	Team
Bronze medal – third place	2017 Cali
Bolivarian Games
Gold medal – first place	2012 Trujillo	Team
Silver medal – second place	2017 Santa Marta	Team
Junior S. American Championship
Silver medal – second place	2012 Peru	Team
Silver medal – second place	2014 Colombia	Team
Youth S. American Championship
Gold medal – first place	2012 Peru	Team
Bronze medal – third place	2010 Peru	Team
U16 S. American Championship
Silver medal – second place	2011 Canelones	Team
- Updated on October 2015

María Ángela Leyva Tagle (born November 22, 1996) is a Peruvian volleyball player who plays for the Peru national team. At the age of 14 she had already been in all categories of Peru's national team, Child (U16), Youth (U18), Junior (U20) and Senior.

Leyva was captain of the team that won gold at the 2012 Youth South American Championship, the first gold medal for Peruvian volleyball in that category after 32 years and the first gold in any category in 19 years.

== Career ==
=== 2010-2011 ===
Leyva first started playing volleyball at Camino de Vida Volleyball Club in the Peruvian National League. At the age of 14 she was named captain of the U16 squad with looks for the first South American Championship of that category.

She was invited to be a part of the Peruvian senior team for the 2011 Montreux Volley Masters.

When Camino de Vida Volleyball Club dissolved, Cenaida Uribe, Peruvian ex-volleyball player and Olympic silver medalist made the club into Universidad San Martín. Leyva stayed in the team and was joined by international figures such as Dominican Republic's Cándida Arias. The club finished second in their first season at the LNSV.

Leyva then participated in the first U16 South American Championship. The team captained by Leyva defeated Brazil for the first time in 19 years. Peru finished second at the tournament and Leyva was named Best Spiker and Best Scorer.

Leyva was once again invited to play for the senior team at the 2012 Pan American Cups, first at the Senior Pan-American Cup and then at the U23 Cup. Leyva then participated in the 2012 South American Junior Championship where the Peruvian team finished second; Leyva was named Best Server.

=== 2012: South American Gold ===
Leyva was captain of the team that won gold at the 2012 Youth South American Championship, the first gold medal for Peruvian volleyball in that category after 32 years and the first gold in any category in 19 years. Leyva was named Best Scorer, Spiker and Most Valuable Player of the tournament.

=== 2013: World Championships ===
Leyva was part of both the junior and the youth Peruvian teams that competed at the 2013 world championships, in June, at the Junior World Championship, Peruvian girls finished in 12th place and Leyva was the third best scorer of the tournament.

At the Youth World Championship, with the nickname "Dark Horses" Peruvian girls reached the semifinals of the tournament for the first time in 20 years and for the second time ever, Leyva was captain of the team. At the semifinals against China, Peru and China played until the tie-break where Peru had 10 match points but China saved them all, at the end the Chinese won the match 3–2. Peru eventually finished 4th after losing the bronze medal to classic rival Brazil. Leyva was part of the ideal team being awarded as Best Opposite.

=== 2015 ===
Leyva won the Best Opposite individual award from the 2015 Pan-American Cup and her national team ranked in ninth place. She then won the Best Outside Hitter and the silver medal in the 2015 South American Championship.

=== 2017 ===
For the 2017/18 season, she played on loan with the Brazilian club Osasco Voleibol Clube, working under the same head coach as the Peruvian national team. She won the silver medal in the 2017 Bolivarian Games under 23 tournament.

=== 2018 ===
Leyva decided not to be part of the Peruvian team due to a shoulder injury that made it impossible for her to play. She will return to wear the national shirt for the season of selections 2019. For the 2018/19 season, she renewed a contract with the Brazilian club Osasco Voleibol Clube for this season. According to Cenaida Uribe, clubs from Italy, USA and Turkey want it, but especially the Italian club Pallavolo Scandicci for two seasons, but both parties did not reach an agreement.

== Clubs ==
- (Peru) Camino de Vida (2010–2011)
- (Peru) Universidad San Martín (2011–2017)
- (Brazil) Osasco Voleibol Clube (2017–2019)
- (Turkey) PTT Spor Kulübü (2019-2020)
- (Russia) VC Yenisey Krasnoyarsk (2020-2021)
- (France) Béziers Volley (2021-2022)
- (Turkey) Çukurova BLD Spor Kulübü (2022-2024)
- (Turkey) Aydın Büyükşehir Belediyespor (2024-2025)
- (Turkey) Beşiktaş JK (2025-2026)
- (Greece) A.E.K. Athens (2026-)

== Awards ==
=== Individuals ===
- 2011 U16 South American Championship "Best spiker"
- 2011 U16 South American Championship "Best scorer"
- 2012 Liga Nacional Juvenil de Voleibol Femenino "Best scorer"
- 2012 Liga Nacional Juvenil de Voleibol Femenino "Best spiker"
- 2012 Junior South American Championship "Best server"
- 2012 Youth South American Championship "Best spiker"
- 2012 Youth South American Championship "Most valuable player"
- 2013 Copa Latina "Best spiker"
- 2013 FIVB Girls Youth World Championship "Best opposite"
- 2014 South American Club Championship " Best Outside Spiker"
- 2014 Women's U22 South American Championship "Most valuable player"
- 2014 Final Four Cup "Best receiver"
- 2015 South American Club Championship "Best outside spiker"
- 2014–15 Liga Nacional Superior de Voleibol Femenino "Best outside spiker"
- 2014–15 Liga Nacional Superior de Voleibol Femenino "Best spiker"
- 2015 Copa Latina U20 "Best opposite"
- 2015 Copa Latina U20 "Most valuable player"
- 2015 South American World Cup Qualifier "Best opposite"
- 2015 Pan-American Cup "Best opposite"
- 2015 South American Championship "Best outside hitter"
- 2016 Summer Olympics South American qualification tournament "Best outside hitter"
- 2016 South American Club Championship "Best outside spiker"
- 2015–16 Liga Nacional Superior de Voleibol Femenino "Best outside spiker"
- 2015–16 Liga Nacional Superior de Voleibol Femenino "Most valuable player"
- 2016 Women's U22 South American Championship "Best outside spiker"
- 2016 U23 Pan-American Cup "Best outside spiker"
- 2017 South American Club Championship "Best outside spiker"
- 2016–17 Liga Nacional Superior de Voleibol Femenino "Best outside spiker"
- 2016–17 Liga Nacional Superior de Voleibol Femenino "Best scorer"
- 2017 South American Championship "Best outside hitter"

=== National team ===
- 2013 Bolivarian Games – Gold Medal
- 2015 South American Championship – Silver Medal

==== Junior team ====
- 2010 Youth South American Championship – Bronze Medal
- 2011 U16 South American Championship – Silver Medal
- 2012 Junior South American Championship – Silver Medal
- 2012 Youth South American Championship – Gold Medal
- 2014 Junior South American Championship – Silver Medal
- 2014 Junior Final Four Cup – Gold Medal
- 2016 U22 South American Championship – Bronze Medal

=== Clubs ===
- 2011-12 Liga Nacional Superior de Voleibol Femenino – Runner-up with Universidad San Martín
- 2012-13 Liga Nacional Superior de Voleibol Femenino – Runner-up with Universidad San Martín
- 2013-14 Liga Nacional Superior de Voleibol Femenino – Champion with Universidad San Martín
- 2014-15 Liga Nacional Superior de Voleibol Femenino – Champion with Universidad San Martín
- 2015 South American Club Championship Bronze with Universidad San Martín
- 2015-16 Liga Nacional Superior de Voleibol Femenino – Champion with Universidad San Martín
- 2016 South American Club Championship Silver with Universidad San Martín
- 2017 South American Club Championship Bronze with Universidad San Martín
- 2018 Copa Brasil de Voleibol Feminino Gold with Osasco Voleibol Clube
- 2017-18 Brazilian Women's Volleyball Superliga – 4th place with Osasco Voleibol Clube
- 2017-18 Liga Nacional Superior de Voleibol Femenino – Champion with Universidad San Martín
- 2018 Campeonato Paulista de Voleibol Feminino – Runner-up with Osasco Voleibol Clube
- 2018 Supercopa Brasileira de Voleibol – Runner-up with Osasco Voleibol Clube
- 2020-21 Russian Women's Volleyball Super League – 10th with VC Yenisey Krasnoyarsk
- 2020-21 Russian Women's Volleyball Cup – 17th with VC Yenisey Krasnoyarsk
- 2021-22 CEV Women's Champions League – 11th with Béziers Volley
- 2021-22 LNV Ligue A Féminine – 9th with Béziers Volley
- 2021-22 French Cup – Bronze with Béziers Volley
- 2021-22 French SuperCup – Runner-up with Béziers Volley
- 2022–23 Turkish Women's Volleyball Cup – 14th with Çukurova Belediyespor
- 2022–23 Turkish Women's Volleyball League – 9th with Çukurova Belediyespor

Awards
Preceded by (Brazil) Fernanda Garay (Peru) Karla Ortiz	Best Outside Hitter of South American Championship; 2015 ex aequo (Brazil) Gabriela Guimarães; 2017 ex aequo (Brazil) Natália Pereira	Succeeded by TBD
