= Gabriela Guimarães =

Brazilian volleyball player (born 1994)

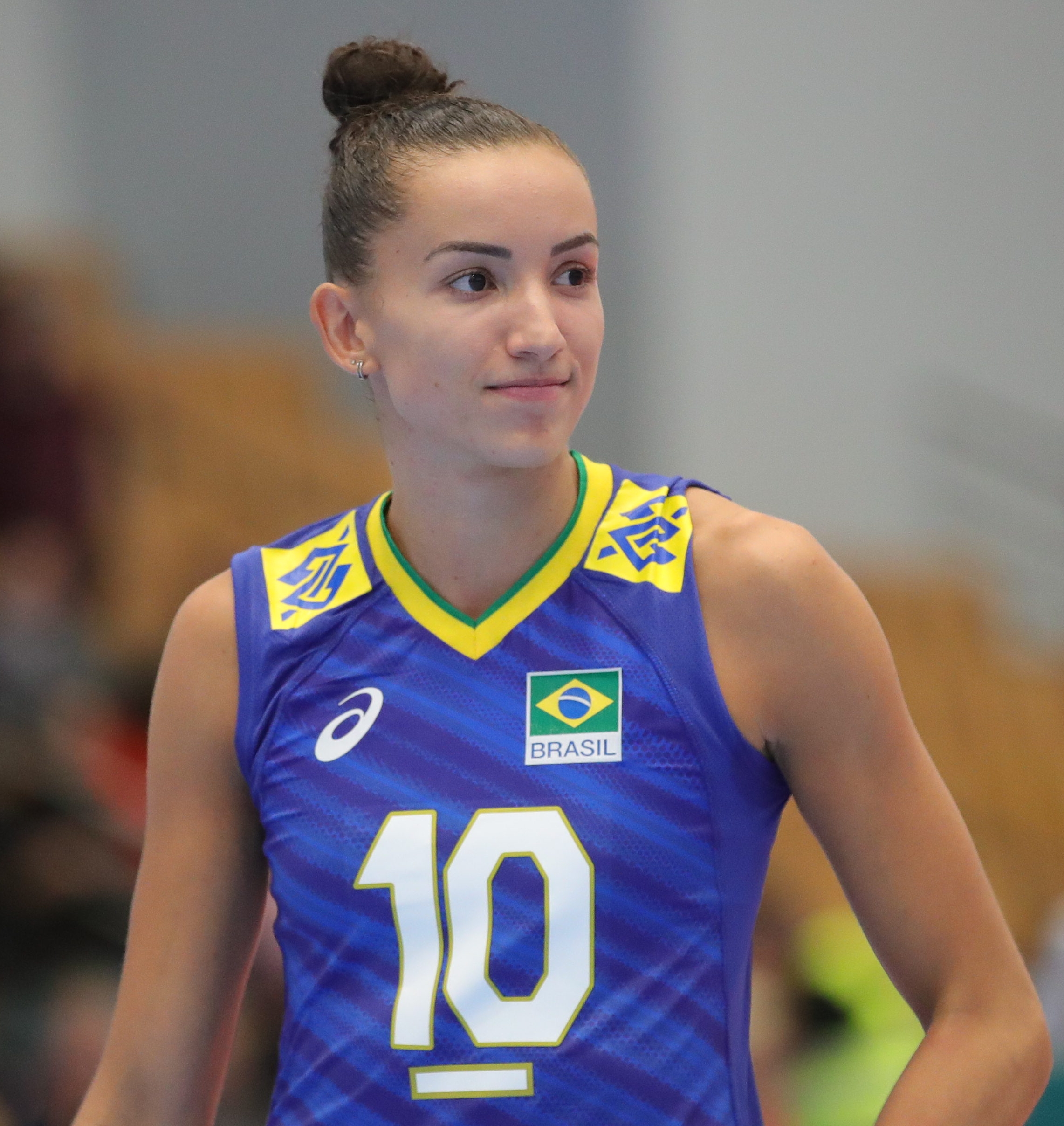
- Guimarães in 2022

Personal information
- Full name: Gabriela Braga Guimarães
- Nickname: Gabi; Daughter Of The Volleyball God
- Born: 19 May 1994 (age 32); Belo Horizonte, Minas Gerais, Brazil
- Height: 1.80 m (5 ft 11 in)
- Weight: 65 kg (143 lb)
- Spike: 305 cm (120 in)
- Block: 289 cm (114 in)

Volleyball information
- Position: Outside hitter
- Current club: (Italy) Imoco Volley Conegliano
- Number: 10

Career
Years
- 2009–2011
- 2011–2018
- 2018–2019
- 2019–2024
- 2024–
Teams
- (Brazil) Mackenzie Esporte Clube
- (Brazil) Rio de Janeiro
- (Brazil) Minas Tênis Clube
- (Turkey) Vakifbank Istanbul
- (Italy) Imoco Volley Conegliano

National team
2012–present	Brazil
Honours
Women's volleyball
Representing Brazil
Olympic Games
Silver medal – second place	2020 Tokyo	Team
Bronze medal – third place	2024 Paris	Team
World Championship
Silver medal – second place	2022 Poland/Netherlands	Team
Bronze medal – third place	2014 Italy	Team
Bronze medal – third place	2025 Thailand	Team
World Grand Champions Cup
Silver medal – second place	2017 Japan	Team
Nations League
Silver medal – second place	2019 Nanjing	Team
Silver medal – second place	2021 Rimini	Team
Silver medal – second place	2022 Ankara	Team
Silver medal – second place	2025 Łódź	Team
Silver medal – second place	2026 Macau	Team
World Grand Prix
Gold medal – first place	2013 Sapporo	Team
Gold medal – first place	2014 Tokyo	Team
Gold medal – first place	2016 Bangkok	Team
Bronze medal – third place	2015 Omaha	Team
South American Championship
Gold medal – first place	2013 Ica	Team
Gold medal – first place	2015 Cartagena	Team
Gold medal – first place	2021 Barrancabermeja	Team
Gold medal – first place	2023 Recife	Team
Gold medal – first place	2026 Rio de Janeiro	Team
- Last updated: 14 September 2026

Gabriela Braga Guimarães (Portuguese pronunciation: [ɡabɾiˈɛlɐ ˈbɾaɡɐ ɡimaˈɾɐ̃j̃s]; born 19 May 1994), also known by her nickname Gabi, is a Brazilian professional indoor volleyball player. She plays as an outside hitter. She competed at the 2020 Summer Olympics and 2024 Summer Olympics, winning a silver medal in Tokyo and a bronze medal in Paris. Gabi is considered one of the best volleyball players in the world, earning the nicknames “Miss Everything” and “the daughter of the volleyball God” for her ability to perform at a high level in every skill.

== Career ==
Guimarães practiced swimming, tennis, and football in Belo Horizonte, before starting volleyball at the age of 14. She joined the volleyball team at Colégio Pitágoras to be close to her friends, and since the school had a partnership with the Minas Tênis Clube, she tried to join their team. However, she was rejected for being considered too short. She then moved to Mackenzie Esporte Clube, where her aunt had previously won a volleyball championship. Coach Delicélio Rodrigues gave her an opportunity.

In her first year at Mackenzie, Guimarães was selected for the Minas Gerais youth state team, which finished ninth in the Brazilian Championship of State Teams held in Fortaleza, Ceará. Soon after, she was called up to the Brazil national youth team for the 2010 South American Championship in Lima, Peru. Guimarães helped Brazil win the title and was individually recognized as the tournament's Best Spiker and Most Valuable Player (MVP).

She also represented Minas Gerais in the national youth championship (Special Division), again in Fortaleza, finishing fifth.

In 2010, playing for BMG/Mackenzie, she won the Minas Gerais state championship and competed in the 2010–11 Brazilian Superliga, where her team finished ninth.

She returned to the national team to play in the 2011 FIVB Girls' Youth World Championship in Ankara, Turkey, wearing jersey number 8. Brazil finished sixth, but Guimarães stood out individually, scoring 155 points to become the tournament's top scorer. She was also sixth among best spikers, sixteenth among best blockers, fourteenth among best servers, tenth among best diggers, and also stood out for her reception performance.

Guimarães continued with BMG/Mackenzie in 2011, finishing as runner-up in the Minas Gerais state championship and playing in the 2011–12 Brazilian Superliga, where the team finished seventh after the quarterfinals.

She was once again called to represent the Minas Gerais team in the 2012 Brazilian Championship (youth category), 1st Division, held in Minas Gerais, where she helped the team secure the title.

Guimarães played with her national team, winning the bronze at the 2014 World Championship when her team defeated Italy 3–2 in the bronze medal match.

During the 2015 FIVB Club World Championship, Guimarães played with the Brazilian club Rexona Ades Rio and her team lost the bronze medal match to the Swiss Voléro Zürich. She helped her national team to win the 2015 South American Championship gold medal and she was also awarded Most Valuable Player and Best Outside Hitter.

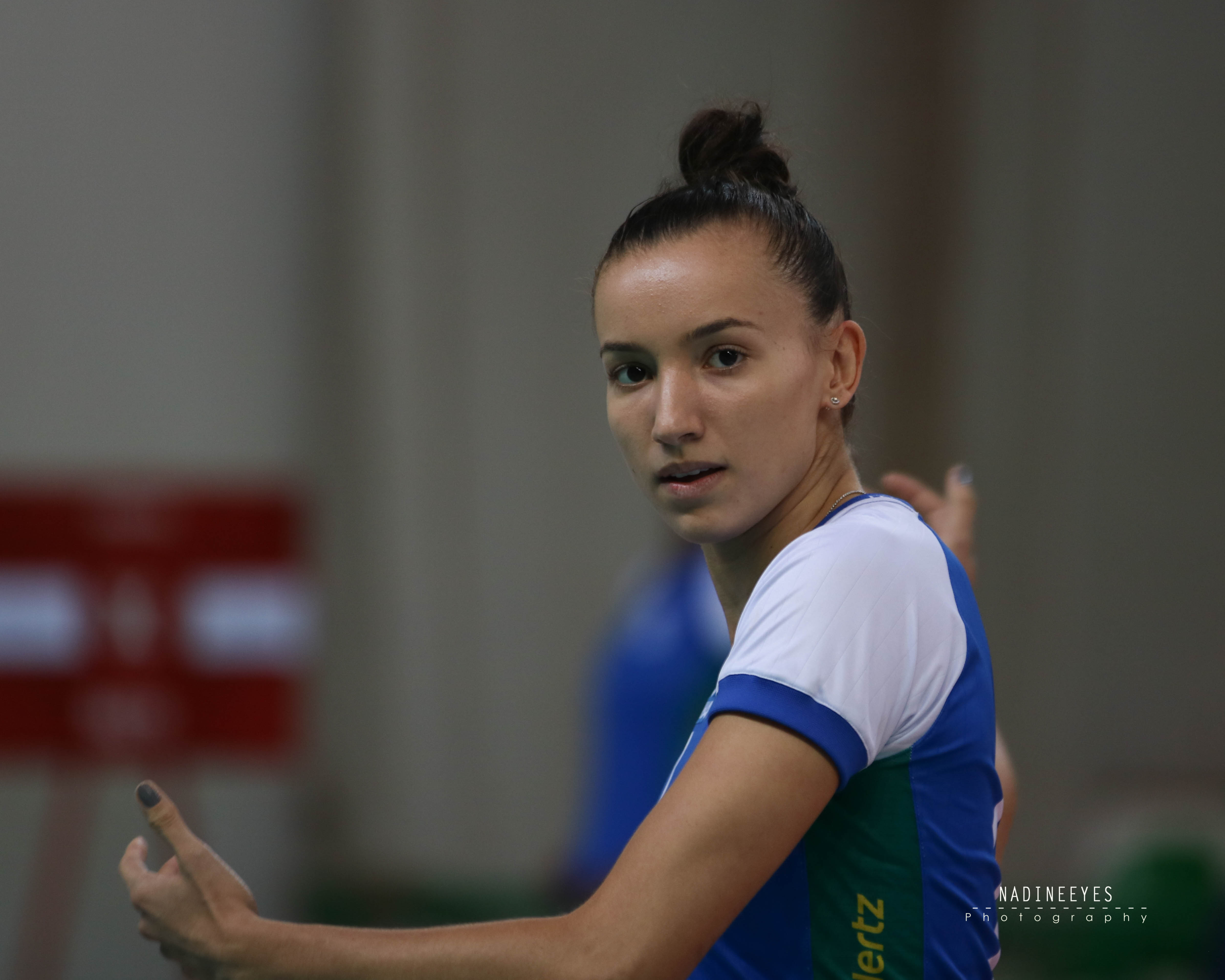
Guimarães playing for Minas in 2018

In May 2018, Guimarães ended her six-year stint with Rio de Janeiro and signed with Camponesa/Minas TC in Belo Horizonte. She stated that her decision to join the club was influenced by the opportunity to reunite with Natália Pereira, who had joined Minas shortly before, and also to be closer to her family before considering a move abroad. She won the 2018 Minas Gerais State Championship with Minas, and competed in the 2018 FIVB Club World Championship in Shaoxing. In the semifinals, she played a key role in helping her team come back from a 24–19 deficit in the second set against favorites Eczacıbaşı VitrA, securing a spot in the final.

The team won the silver medal, and Gabi was named Best Outside Spiker of the tournament.

With Itambé/Minas, she won the 2019 Copa Brasil held in Gramado, and also became a two-time South American Club Champion in 2019 in Belo Horizonte, where she was awarded Best Outside Spiker. She also helped the team win the 2018–19 Brazilian Superliga and was selected as the second Best Outside Spiker of the season.

In 2019, she also helped the Brazil national team win the silver medal at the Nations League, after losing the final to the United States. Gabi was named Best Outside Spiker of the tournament.

Following her performances, she signed with Turkish powerhouse Vakifbank Istanbul for the 2019–20 season and played there until 2024.

In 2021, Guimarães led the national team to two silver medals — at the Nations League and the Tokyo 2020 Olympics.

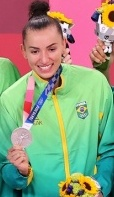
Guimarães in 2021 at the Olympic Games

She led her national team as captain to the 2022 FIVB Volleyball Women's Nations League where they won the silver medal.

During her third Olympic appearance at Paris 2024, Guimarães blamed herself for the semifinal loss to the United States, stating she struggled to find her rhythm despite her tactical importance, but bounced back to help Brazil win the bronze medal against Turkey and was named one of the tournament's Best Outside Spikers.

== Personal life ==
During the second round of the 2026 Brazilian general election, Gabi stated on her social media accounts that she would be supporting Luiz Inácio Lula da Silva’s campaign for reelection as president of Brazil, and would vote for him. She also explained why she was doing this.

== Awards and titles ==
=== Individuals ===
- 2010 Youth South American Championship – "Best spiker"
- 2011 FIVB U18 World Championship – "Best scorer"
- 2013 South American Club Championship – "Best spiker"
- 2013 FIVB U20 World Championship – "Best outside spiker"
- 2015 South American Championship – "Most valuable player"
- 2015 South American Championship – "Best outside spiker"
- 2014–15 Brazilian Superliga – "Best spiker"
- 2014–15 Brazilian Superliga – "Best scorer"
- 2017 South American Club Championship – "Most valuable player"
- 2017 FIVB Club World Championship – "Best outside spiker"
- 2018 FIVB Club World Championship – "Best outside spiker"
- 2019 South American Club Championship – "Best outside spiker"
- 2018–19 Brazilian Superliga – "Best outside spiker"
- 2019 FIVB Nations League – "Best outside spiker"
- 2021 FIVB Nations League – "Best outside spiker"
- 2021 South American Championship – "Most valuable player"
- 2021 FIVB Club World Championship – "Best outside spiker"
- 2021–22 CEV Champions League – "Most valuable player"
- 2022 FIVB Nations League – "Best outside spiker"
- 2022 FIVB World Championship – "Best outside spiker"
- 2022 FIVB Club World Championships – "Best outside spiker"
- 2023 South American Championship – "Best outside spiker"
- 2023 South American Championship – "Most valuable player"
- 2023 FIVB Club World Championship – "Best outside spiker"
- 2024 Summer Olympics – "Best outside hitter"
- 2024–25 Italian League – "Most valuable player"
- 2025 FIVB Club World Championship – "Best outside spiker"
- 2025 Prêmio Brasil Olímpico – Fan's Choice
- 2025–26 Italian Cup – "Most valuable player"

=== Clubs ===
- 2012–13 Brazilian Superliga – Champion, with Rio de Janeiro VC
- 2013 South American Club Championship – Champion, with Rio de Janeiro VC
- 2013 FIVB Club World Championship – Runner-Up, with Rio de Janeiro VC
- 2013–14 Brazilian Superliga – Champion, with Rio de Janeiro VC
- 2014–15 Brazilian Superliga – Champion, with Rio de Janeiro VC
- 2015 South American Club Championship – Champion, with Rio de Janeiro VC
- 2015 Brazilian Super Cup – Champion, with Rio de Janeiro VC
- 2015–16 Brazilian Cup – Champion, with Rio de Janeiro VC
- 2015–16 Brazilian Superliga – Champion, with Rio de Janeiro VC
- 2016 South American Club Championship – Champion, with Rio de Janeiro VC
- 2016 Brazilian Super Cup – Champion, with Rio de Janeiro VC
- 2016–17 Brazilian Cup – Champion, with Rio de Janeiro VC
- 2016–17 Brazilian Superliga – Champion, with Rio de Janeiro VC
- 2017 South American Club Championship – Champion, with Rio de Janeiro VC
- 2017 Brazilian Super Cup – Champion, with Rio de Janeiro VC
- 2017 FIVB Club World Championship – Runner-Up, with Rio de Janeiro VC
- 2017–18 Brazilian Superliga – Runner-Up, with Rio de Janeiro VC
- 2018 South American Club Championship – Runner-Up, with Rio de Janeiro VC
- 2018 FIVB Club World Championship – Runner-Up, with Minas TC
- 2018–19 Brazilian Cup – Champion, with Minas TC
- 2018–19 Brazilian Superliga – Champion, with Minas TC
- 2019 South American Club Championship – Champion, with Minas TC
- 2019 Turkish Super Cup – Runner-Up, with VakıfBank S.K.
- 2019 FIVB Club World Championship – Bronze medal, with Vakıfbank S.K.
- 2020 Turkish Super Cup – Runner-Up, with VakıfBank S.K.
- 2020–21 Turkish Cup – Champion, with Vakıfbank S.K.
- 2020–21 Turkish League – Champion, with VakıfBank S.K.
- 2020–21 CEV Champions League – Runner-Up, with VakıfBank S.K.
- 2021 Turkish Super Cup – Champion, with VakıfBank S.K.
- 2021 FIVB Club World Championship – Champion, with VakıfBank S.K.
- 2021–22 Turkish Cup – Champion, with Vakıfbank S.K.
- 2021–22 Turkish League – Champion, with VakıfBank S.K.
- 2021–22 CEV Champions League – Champion, with Vakıfbank S.K.
- 2022 Turkish Super Cup – Runner-Up, with VakıfBank S.K.
- 2022 FIVB Club World Championship – Runner-Up, with VakıfBank S.K.
- 2022–23 Turkish Cup – Champion, with Vakıfbank S.K.
- 2022–23 CEV Champions League – Champion, with VakıfBank S.K.
- 2023 Turkish Super Cup – Champion, with VakıfBank S.K.
- 2023 FIVB Club World Championship – Runner-Up, with VakıfBank S.K.
- 2024 Italian Super Cup – Champion, with Imoco Volley Conegliano
- 2024 Club World Championship – Champion, with Imoco Volley Conegliano
- 2024–25 Italian Cup – Champion, with Imoco Volley Conegliano
- 2024–25 Italian League – Champion, with Imoco Volley Conegliano
- 2024–25 CEV Champions League – Champion, with Imoco Volley Conegliano
- 2025 Italian Super Cup – Runner-Up, with Imoco Volley Conegliano
- 2025 Club World Championship – Runner-Up, with Imoco Volley Conegliano
- 2025–26 Italian Cup – Champion, with Imoco Volley Conegliano
- 2025–26 Italian League – Champion, with Imoco Volley Conegliano
- 2026 Italian Super Cup – Champion, with Imoco Volley Conegliano

Awards
Preceded by (Colombia) Madelaynne Montaño - (Brazil) Lorenne Teixeira	Most Valuable Player of South American Championship; 2015; 2021; 2023	Succeeded by (Brazil) Tandara Caixeta - Incumbent
Preceded by (Brazil) Fernanda Garay (Peru) Karla Ortiz - (Colombia) Amanda Coneo (Argentina) Daniela Bulaich	Best Outside Spiker of South American Championship; 2015 (with (Peru) Ángela Leyva); 2023 (with (Colombia) Amanda Coneo)	Succeeded by (Brazil) Natália Pereira (Peru) Ángela Leyva - Incumbent
Preceded by (Russia) Tatiana Kosheleva and (China) Zhu Ting - (South Korea) Kim Yeon-koung and (United States) Kimberly Hill	Best Outside Spiker of FIVB Club World Championship; 2017 (with (China) Zhu Ting); 2018 (with (China) Zhu Ting); 2021 (with (Russia) Arina Fedorovtseva); 2022 (with (United States) Kelsey Robinson); 2023 (with (China) Li Yingying)	Succeeded by (South Korea) Kim Yeon-koung and (United States) Kimberly Hill - (China) Li Yingying and (China) Zhu Ting
Preceded by (United States) Michelle Bartsch-Hackley and (China) Zhu Ting - (Italy) Miriam Sylla and (Japan) Sarina Koga	Best Outside Spiker of FIVB Nations League; 2019 (with (China) Liu Yanhan); 2021 (with (United States) Michelle Bartsch-Hackley); 2022 (with (Italy) Caterina Bosetti); 2025 (with (Italy) Miriam Sylla)	Succeeded by (China) Li Yingying and (Poland) Martyna Łukasik
Preceded by (Italy) Miriam Sylla and (China) Zhu Ting	Best Outside Hitter of FIVB World Championship; 2022 (with (Italy) Miriam Sylla); 2025 (with (Japan) Mayu Ishikawa)	Succeeded by Incumbent
