= 2015–16 Liga Nacional Superior de Voleibol Femenino =

Liga Nacional Superior de Voleibol Femenino
- Association: FPV
- League: Liga Peruana de Vóley Femenino
- Sport: Volleyball
- Duration: November 14, 2015 to April 24, 2016
- Teams: 12
- Relegated: Sider Perú; Divino Maestro
- Finals champions: Universidad San Martín (3rd title)
- Runners-up: Regatas Lima

Seasons
- ← 2014–15 2016–17 →

The 2015–16 Liga Nacional Superior de Voleibol Femenino (Spanish for: 2015–16 Women's Senior National Volleyball League) or 2015–16 LNSVF was the 14th official season of the Peruvian Volleyball League. Universidad San Martín was crowned three-time champion after defeating Regatas Lima 3–1 in the extra game, consolidating its dominance in the competition.

Sport Loreto was disqualified from the tournament after failing to appear for its first two matches, both of which were awarded as walkovers.

== Teams ==
=== Competing teams ===
Club	Manager
Alianza Lima	(Peru) Carlos Aparicio
Circolo Sportivo Italiano	(Peru) Manuel Artieda
Divino Maestro	(Peru) Carlos Rivero
Géminis	(Brazil) Marco Antonio Queiroga
Jaamsa	(Cuba) Juan Carlos Gala
Regatas Lima	(Spain) Francisco Hervás
Sider Perú	(Peru) Sixto Mendoza Ramírez
Sport Loreto	—
Sporting Cristal	(Peru) Edwin Jiménez
Túpac Amaru	(Peru) Heinz Garro Paso
Universidad César Vallejo	(Peru) Natalia Málaga
Universidad San Martín	(Spain) Juan Diego García

== First stage ==
The first round is a Round-Robin system where all 11 teams will play once against the other 10.

Pool standing procedure

1. Numbers of matches won
2. Match points
3. Sets ratio
4. Points ratio

Match won 3–0 or 3–1: 3 match points for the winner, 0 match points for the loser
Match won 3–2: 2 match points for the winner, 1 match point for the loser

Ranking

Pos	Team	Pld	W	L	Pts	SPW	SPL	SPR	SW	SL	SR	Qualification
1	Géminis	10	9	1	26	921	744	1.238	29	11	2.636	Second stage
2	Universidad San Martín	10	8	2	24	848	664	1.277	26	9	2.889	Second stage
3	Universidad César Vallejo	10	8	2	22	830	688	1.206	26	10	2.600	Second stage
4	Regatas Lima	10	6	4	19	792	706	1.122	22	12	1.833	Second stage
5	Jaamsa	10	7	3	18	900	842	1.069	24	17	1.412	Second stage
6	Sporting Cristal	10	5	5	18	802	778	1.031	21	16	1.313	Second stage
7	Alianza Lima	10	4	6	15	831	836	0.994	19	20	0.950	Second stage
8	Circolo Sportivo Italiano	10	4	6	11	795	831	0.957	15	23	0.652	Second stage
9	Túpac Amaru	10	3	7	9	732	821	0.892	12	24	0.500	Hexagonal por la permanencia
10	Sider Perú	10	1	9	3	542	779	0.696	4	28	0.143	Hexagonal por la permanencia
11	Divino Maestro	10	0	10	0	478	782	0.611	2	30	0.067	Hexagonal por la permanencia

=== Results ===
Date		Score		Set 1	Set 2	Set 3	Set 4	Set 5	Total	Report
14 Nov	Universidad César Vallejo	3–0	Circolo Sportivo Italiano	25–14	25–16	25–18			75–48	
14 Nov	Regatas Lima	3–0	Jaamsa	27–25	25–22	25–20			77–67	
15 Nov	Géminis	3–0	Divino Maestro	25–6	25–12	25–17			75–35	
15 Nov	Sporting Cristal	3–0	Túpac Amaru	25–19	25–17	25–23			75–59	
20 Nov	Regatas Lima	3–0	Túpac Amaru	25–23	25–19	25–20			75–62	
20 Nov	Universidad San Martín	3–0	Divino Maestro	25–5	25–13	25–16			75–34	
21 Nov	Géminis	2–3	Jaamsa	27–25	25–15	21–25	21–25	10–15	104–105	
21 Nov	Alianza Lima	0–3	Sporting Cristal	20–25	21–25	22–25			63–75	
22 Nov	Universidad San Martín	3–0	Circolo Sportivo Italiano	25–21	25–19	25–21			75–61	
22 Nov	Divino Maestro	1–3	Túpac Amaru	21–25	16–25	25–13	18–25		80–88	
27 Nov	Divino Maestro	0–3	Jaamsa	13–25	15–25	15–25			43–75	
27 Nov	Géminis	3–1	Túpac Amaru	25–20	21–25	25–23	25–22		96–90	
29 Nov	Sider Perú	0–3	Alianza Lima	17–25	10–25	17–25			44–75	
29 Nov	Universidad César Vallejo	3–0	Sporting Cristal	25–11	25–12	26–24			76–47	
4 Dec	Regatas Lima	1–3	Alianza Lima	24–26	25–18	23–25	23–25		95–94	
4 Dec	Sider Perú	0–3	Universidad César Vallejo	11–25	15–25	16–25			42–75	
5 Dec	Circolo Sportivo Italiano	3–1	Sider Perú	25–19	26–28	25–21	25–20		101–88	
5 Dec	Universidad San Martín	3–1	Jaamsa	25–15	25–21	22–25	25–15		97–76	
6 Dec	Universidad César Vallejo	3–0	Regatas Lima	25–18	26–24	26–24			77–66	
6 Dec	Géminis	3–1	Alianza Lima	21–25	25–17	25–21	25–23		96–86	
15 Jan	Sporting Cristal	3–0	Divino Maestro	25–17	25–13	25–12			75–42	
15 Jan	Regatas Lima	3–0	Circolo Sportivo Italiano	25–16	25–19	25–23			75–58	
16 Jan	Universidad San Martín	3–0	Sider Perú	25–16	25–8	25–19			75–43	
16 Jan	Alianza Lima	2–3	Túpac Amaru	25–21	25–22	23–25	21–25	8–15	102–108	
17 Jan	Géminis	3–0	Sider Perú	25–9	25–14	25–7			75–30	
17 Jan	Universidad César Vallejo	3–2	Jaamsa	25–16	25–23	23–25	18–25	15–10	106–99	
22 Jan	Regatas Lima	3–0	Divino Maestro	25–16	25–18	25–16			75–50	
22 Jan	Jaamsa	3–2	Circolo Sportivo Italiano	26–24	25–20	23–25	26–28	15–9	115–106	
23 Jan	Universidad César Vallejo	3–0	Divino Maestro	25–8	25–12	25–15			75–35	
23 Jan	Universidad San Martín	3–0	Túpac Amaru	25–15	25–16	25–9			75–40	
24 Jan	Géminis	3–0	Circolo Sportivo Italiano	25–14	25–17	25–11			75–42	
24 Jan	Alianza Lima	2–3	Jaamsa	25–23	20–25	20–25	25–21	8–15	98–109	
29 Jan	Alianza Lima	3–0	Divino Maestro	25–15	25–17	25–13			75–45	
29 Jan	Túpac Amaru	3–0	Sider Perú	25–20	25–21	25–17			75–58	
30 Jan	Jaamsa	3–0	Sider Perú	25–10	25–21	25–13			75–44	
30 Jan	Universidad San Martín	1–3	Sporting Cristal	25–19	22–25	16–25	24–26		87–95	
31 Jan	Alianza Lima	3–1	Circolo Sportivo Italiano	25–16	25–16	17–25	25–23		92–80	
31 Jan	Géminis	3–1	Universidad César Vallejo	25–18	25–18	23–25	25–13		98–74	
3 Feb	Circolo Sportivo Italiano	3–0	Divino Maestro	25–13	25–12	25–11			75–36	
3 Feb	Regatas Lima	3–0	Sporting Cristal	25–22	25–13	25–17			75–52	
5 Feb	Universidad San Martín	3–0	Alianza Lima	25–21	25–17	25–21			75–48	
5 Feb	Universidad César Vallejo	3–0	Túpac Amaru	25–11	25–23	26–24			75–58	
6 Feb	Sporting Cristal	2–3	Circolo Sportivo Italiano	25–22	25–27	24–26	25–16	16–14	115–105	
6 Feb	Géminis	3–2	Regatas Lima	25–20	21–25	25–15	18–25	15–10	104–95	
7 Feb	Túpac Amaru	0–3	Jaamsa	19–25	17–25	21–25			57–75	
7 Feb	Universidad San Martín	3–1	Universidad César Vallejo	22–25	25–18	25–21	25–23		97–87	
10 Feb	Géminis	3–2	Sporting Cristal	25–16	14–25	25–16	23–25	15–11	102–93	
10 Feb	Universidad San Martín	3–1	Regatas Lima	25–21	25–18	23–25	25–20		98–84	
12 Feb	Divino Maestro	1–3	Sider Perú	25–18	9–25	20–25	24–26		78–94	
12 Feb	Sporting Cristal	2–3	Jaamsa	26–28	25–15	23–25	25–21	11–15	110–104	
13 Feb	Regatas Lima	3–0	Sider Perú	25–13	25–14	25–14			75–44	
13 Feb	Túpac Amaru	2–3	Circolo Sportivo Italiano	26–24	16–25	16–25	16–25	12–15	95–109	
14 Feb	Sporting Cristal	3–0	Sider Perú	25–13	25–23	25–19			75–55	
14 Feb	Universidad César Vallejo	3–2	Alianza Lima	25–18	25–17	25–17	23–25	15–13	109–98	
14 Feb	Universidad San Martín	1–3	Géminis	22–25	27–29	20–25	27–29		94–96	

== Second stage ==
The second stage of the tournament will see the best 8 teams from the first stage compete in another Round-Robin system, according to the finishing will be the play-offs.

Pool standing procedure

1. Match points
2. Numbers of matches won
3. Sets ratio
4. Points ratio

Match won 3–0 or 3–1: 3 match points for the winner, 0 match points for the loser
Match won 3–2: 2 match points for the winner, 1 match point for the loser

Ranking

Pos	Team	Pld	W	L	Pts	SPW	SPL	SPR	SW	SL	SR	Qualification
1	Universidad César Vallejo	7	6	1	19	607	513	1.183	20	5	4.000	Third stage
2	Universidad San Martín	7	6	1	15	639	568	1.125	18	10	1.800	Third stage
3	Géminis	7	5	2	14	635	565	1.124	18	11	1.636	Third stage
4	Regatas Lima	7	4	3	12	586	567	1.034	15	11	1.364	Third stage
5	Sporting Cristal	7	3	4	10	634	684	0.927	14	16	0.875	Third stage
6	Jaamsa	7	2	5	6	600	645	0.930	10	18	0.556	Third stage
7	Alianza Lima	7	1	6	4	588	654	0.899	9	20	0.450	Third stage
8	Circolo Sportivo Italiano	7	1	6	4	487	580	0.840	6	19	0.316	Third stage

=== Results ===
Date		Score		Set 1	Set 2	Set 3	Set 4	Set 5	Total	Report
28 Feb	Regatas Lima	3–0	Jaamsa	25–20	25–21	25–23			75–64	
28 Feb	Universidad César Vallejo	3–1	Sporting Cristal	25–19	25–27	25–23	25–23		100–92	
4 Mar	Géminis	3–0	Circolo Sportivo Italiano	25–21	25–20	25–14			75–55	
4 Mar	Universidad San Martín	3–0	Alianza Lima	25–21	25–12	25–18			75–51	
5 Mar	Universidad César Vallejo	3–1	Regatas Lima	25–27	25–15	25–21	28–26		103–89	
5 Mar	Circolo Sportivo Italiano	2–3	Sporting Cristal	21–25	25–14	25–16	21–25	11–15	103–95	
6 Mar	Universidad San Martín	3–1	Jaamsa	20–25	25–21	25–22	25–22		95–90	
6 Mar	Géminis	3–1	Alianza Lima	21–25	25–19	25–11	25–12		96–67	
11 Mar	Universidad César Vallejo	3–0	Universidad San Martín	25–21	27–25	25–20			77–66	
11 Mar	Regatas Lima	3–0	Circolo Sportivo Italiano	25–18	25–19	25–14			75–51	
12 Mar	Alianza Lima	2–3	Jaamsa	25–15	25–23	26–28	21–25	8–15	105–106	
12 Mar	Géminis	1–3	Sporting Cristal	19–25	19–25	25–18	21–25		84–93	
13 Mar	Jaamsa	3–1	Circolo Sportivo Italiano	21–25	25–23	25–21	25–18		96–87	
13 Mar	Sporting Cristal	0–3	Regatas Lima	22–25	19–25	15–25			56–75	
16 Mar	Universidad César Vallejo	3–0	Alianza Lima	30–28	25–18	25–13			80–59	
16 Mar	Jaamsa	2–3	Géminis	15–25	18–25	25–21	25–23	7–15	90–109	
18 Mar	Sporting Cristal	2–3	Universidad San Martín	16–25	25–23	25–22	24–26	11–15	101–111	
18 Mar	Circolo Sportivo Italiano	3–1	Alianza Lima	25–22	25–23	17–25	25–19		92–89	
19 Mar	Jaamsa	0–3	Universidad César Vallejo	22–25	18–25	13–25			53–75	
19 Mar	Géminis	3–0	Regatas Lima	25–14	25–23	25–20			75–57	
20 Mar	Universidad San Martín	3–0	Circolo Sportivo Italiano	25–16	25–16	25–15			75–47	
20 Mar	Sporting Cristal	2–3	Alianza Lima	25–22	25–22	15–25	24–26	9–15	98–110	
23 Mar	Géminis	3–2	Universidad César Vallejo	21–25	14–25	25–15	27–25	15–7	102–97	
23 Mar	Regatas Lima	2–3	Universidad San Martín	25–22	22–25	25–21	20–25	16–18	108–111	
26 Mar	Universidad César Vallejo	3–0	Circolo Sportivo Italiano	25–15	25–18	25–19			75–52	
26 Mar	Regatas Lima	3–2	Alianza Lima	28–26	19–25	27–25	18–25	15–6	107–107	
27 Mar	Jaamsa	1–3	Sporting Cristal	29–31	22–25	25–16	25–27		101–99	
27 Mar	Géminis	2–3	Universidad San Martín	25–23	25–18	15–25	19–25	10–15	94–106	

== Third stage ==
=== Quarterfinals ===
==== First leg ====
Date		Score		Set 1	Set 2	Set 3	Set 4	Set 5	Total	Report
31 Mar	Regatas Lima	3–2	Sporting Cristal	25–22	25–6	21–25	22–25	15–12	108–90	
31 Mar	Universidad César Vallejo	3–0	Circolo Sportivo Italiano	25–13	25–18	25–5			75–36	
1 Apr	Géminis	3–0	Jaamsa	25–18	25–14	27–25			77–57	
1 Apr	Universidad San Martín	3–0	Alianza Lima	25–17	25–20	25–19			75–56	

==== Second leg ====
Date		Score		Set 1	Set 2	Set 3	Set 4	Set 5	Total	Report
2 Apr	Universidad César Vallejo	3–0	Circolo Sportivo Italiano	25–21	25–20	25–21			75–62	
2 Apr	Regatas Lima	3–2	Sporting Cristal	25–23	20–25	25–14	25–27	15–10	110–99	
3 Apr	Universidad San Martín	3–0	Alianza Lima	26–24	25–14	25–15			76–53	
3 Apr	Géminis	3–0	Jaamsa	26–24	25–17	25–20			76–61	

== Fourth stage ==
=== Semifinals ===
==== First leg ====
Date		Score		Set 1	Set 2	Set 3	Set 4	Set 5	Total	Report
15 Apr	Universidad César Vallejo	3–0	Regatas Lima	25–18	25–18	25–20			75–56	
15 Apr	Géminis	2–3	Universidad San Martín	24–26	19–25	26–24	25–12	11–15	105–102	

==== Second leg ====
Date		Score		Set 1	Set 2	Set 3	Set 4	Set 5	Total	Report
16 Apr	Universidad César Vallejo	1–3	Regatas Lima	25–20	21–25	20–25	20–25		86–95	
16 Apr	Universidad San Martín	3–1	Géminis	9–25	25–20	28–26	25–21		87–92	

==== Extra game ====
Date		Score		Set 1	Set 2	Set 3	Set 4	Set 5	Total	Report
17 Apr	Universidad César Vallejo	0–3	Regatas Lima	20–25	17–25	25–27			62–77	

== Fifth stage ==
=== Bronze Medal Matches ===
==== First leg ====
Date		Score		Set 1	Set 2	Set 3	Set 4	Set 5	Total	Report
22 Apr	Géminis	3–1	Universidad César Vallejo	20–25	25–23	25–19	25–20		95–87	

==== Second leg ====
Date		Score		Set 1	Set 2	Set 3	Set 4	Set 5	Total	Report
23 Apr	Géminis	3–2	Universidad César Vallejo	25–27	25–22	23–25	25–17	15–10	113–101	

=== Gold Medal Matches ===
==== First leg ====
Date		Score		Set 1	Set 2	Set 3	Set 4	Set 5	Total	Report
22 Abr	Universidad San Martín	3–0	Regatas Lima	22–25	22–25	21–25			65–75	

==== Second leg ====
Date		Score		Set 1	Set 2	Set 3	Set 4	Set 5	Total	Report
23 Abr	Universidad San Martín	3–1	Regatas Lima	25–22	25–22	16–25	25–21		91–90	

==== Extra game ====
Date		Score		Set 1	Set 2	Set 3	Set 4	Set 5	Total	Report
24 Abr	Universidad San Martín	3–1	Regatas Lima	14–25	25–21	25–18	25–20		89–84	

== Final standing ==
Rank	Team
1st place, gold medalist(s)	Universidad San Martín
2nd place, silver medalist(s)	Regatas Lima
3rd place, bronze medalist(s)	Géminis
4	Universidad César Vallejo
5	Sporting Cristal
6	Jaamsa
7	Alianza Lima
8	Circolo Sportivo Italiano
9	Túpac Amaru
10	Sider Perú
11	Divino Maestro

Team qualified for the 2017 South American Club Championship
Team lost A1 category

2015–16 Liga Nacional Superior de Voleibol;

Universidad San Martín
3rd title

== Awards ==
=== Individual awards ===
- Best scorer
  - (Brazil) Milca Da Silva (Universidad San Martín)
- Best outside hitter
  - (Peru) Ángela Leyva (Universidad San Martín)
- Best central
  - (United States) Sereea Freeman (Regatas Lima)
- Best opposite
  - (Peru) Andrea Sandoval (Géminis)
- Best setter
  - (Peru) Zoila La Rosa (Universidad San Martín)
- Best server
  - (Peru) Myrec Muñoz (Géminis)
- Best libero
  - (Peru) Miriam Patiño (Regatas Lima)
