= 2013–14 Liga Nacional Superior de Voleibol Femenino =

Liga Nacional Superior de Voleibol Femenino
- Association: FPV
- League: Liga Peruana de Vóley Femenino
- Sport: Volleyball
- Duration: December 11, 2013 to April 23, 2014
- Teams: 12
- Relegated: Unión Vallejo Tarapoto
- Finals champions: Universidad San Martín (1st title)
- Runners-up: Sporting Cristal

Seasons
- ← 2012–13 2014–15 →

The 2013–14 Liga Nacional Superior de Voleibol Femenino (Spanish for: 2013–14 Women's Senior National Volleyball League) or 2013–14 LNSVF was the 12th official season of the Peruvian Volleyball League. Universidad San Martín won the league championship.

== Teams ==
=== Competing teams ===
Club	Manager
Alianza Lima	(Peru) Carlos Aparicio
Circolo Sportivo Italiano	(Peru) Edwin Jiménez
Deportivo Wanka	(Peru) Antonio Carrasco
Divino Maestro	(Peru) Carlos Rivero
Géminis	(Peru) Martin Escudero
Latino Amisa	(Peru) César Arrese
Regatas Lima	(Spain) Francisco Hervás
Sporting Cristal	(Peru) Walter Lung
Túpac Amaru	(Peru) José Castillo
Unión Vallejo Tarapoto	(Peru) Alberto Trigoso
Universidad César Vallejo	(Peru) Natalia Málaga
Universidad San Martín	(Spain) Juan D. García

== First stage ==
The first round is a Round-Robin system where all 12 teams will play once against the other 11.

Pool standing procedure

1. Match points
2. Numbers of matches won
3. Sets ratio
4. Points ratio

Match won 3–0 or 3–1: 3 match points for the winner, 0 match points for the loser
Match won 3–2: 2 match points for the winner, 1 match point for the loser

Ranking.

Pos	Team	Pld	W	L	Pts	SW	SL	SR	SPW	SPL	SPR	Qualification
1	Universidad César Vallejo	11	11	0	31	33	4	8.250	893	599	1.491	Second stage
2	Universidad San Martín	11	10	1	30	32	8	4.000	944	733	1.288	Second stage
3	Sporting Cristal	11	8	3	25	29	11	2.636	831	654	1.271	Second stage
4	Alianza Lima	11	8	3	25	24	10	2.400	786	649	1.211	Second stage
5	Géminis	11	8	3	24	23	12	1.917	859	771	1.114	Second stage
6	Circolo Sportivo Italiano	11	6	5	18	20	16	1.250	745	700	1.064	Second stage
7	Regatas Lima	11	5	6	13	17	22	0.773	800	871	0.918	Second stage
8	Deportivo Wanka	11	4	7	12	14	20	0.700	765	794	0.963	Second stage
9	Túpac Amaru	11	3	8	9	11	26	0.423	639	780	0.819	Consolation round
10	Latino Amisa	11	2	9	6	6	28	0.214	557	728	0.765	Consolation round
11	Divino Maestro	11	1	10	3	6	29	0.207	654	837	0.781	Consolation round
12	Unión Vallejo Tarapoto	11	0	11	2	4	33	0.121	608	874	0.696	Consolation round

=== Results ===
==== First Round, December 11 - February 23 ====
The first round consisted of 40 matches, with an average of six matches per week. Teams played seven matches during this round except for four teams that only played six.

Date		Score		Set 1	Set 2	Set 3	Set 4	Set 5	Total
11 Dec	Sporting Cristal	3–0	Deportivo Wanka	25–21	25–9	25–13			75–43
11 Dec	Alianza Lima	3–1	Circolo Sportivo Italiano	25–20	21–25	25–19	26–24		97–88
13 Dec	Regatas Lima	3–0	Divino Maestro	25–22	25–14	25–22			75–58
13 Dec	Universidad San Martín	3–0	Latino Amisa	25–13	26–24	25–14			76–51
08 Jan	Sporting Cristal	3–0	Unión Vallejo Tarapoto	25–21	25–13	25–16			75–50
08 Jan	Universidad César Vallejo	3–0	Túpac Amaru	25–14	25–19	25–15			75–48
10 Jan	Géminis	3–0	Unión Vallejo Tarapoto	25–19	25–23	25–15			75–57
10 Jan	Universidad San Martín	3–0	Circolo Sportivo Italiano	25–10	25–17	25–18			75–45
11 Jan	Deportivo Wanka	3–0	Túpac Amaru	25–17	25–23	25–14			75–51
11 Jan	Universidad César Vallejo	3–0	Latino Amisa	25–16	25–16	25–12			75–44
11 Jan	Alianza Lima	3–0	Regatas Lima	25–21	25–12	25–23			75–56
12 Jan	Unión Vallejo Tarapoto	2–3	Túpac Amaru	11–25	25–21	25–18	19–25	10–15	90–104
12 Jan	Universidad San Martín	3–1	Regatas Lima	25–22	25–14	23–25	25–13		98–74
12 Jan	Géminis	3–0	Divino Maestro	25–18	25–20	25–22			75–60
15 Jan	Sporting Cristal	3–0	Divino Maestro	25–13	25–14	25–15			75–42
15 Jan	Universidad César Vallejo	3–0	Deportivo Wanka	25–19	25–18	25–7			75–44
17 Jan	Circolo Sportivo Italiano	3–0	Latino Amisa	25–21	25–21	25–21			75–63
17 Jan	Alianza Lima	3–0	Géminis	25–18	25–14	25–23			75–55
18 Jan	Túpac Amaru	3–0	Divino Maestro	25–23	25–20	28–26			78–69
18 Jan	Universidad César Vallejo	3–0	Circolo Sportivo Italiano	25–19	25–20	25–14			75–53
18 Jan	Regatas Lima	3–0	Latino Amisa	25–17	25–19	25–19			75–55
19 Jan	Deportivo Wanka	3–2	Divino Maestro	20–25	25–19	29–31	25–18	15–13	114–106
19 Jan	Alianza Lima	3–0	Túpac Amaru	25–20	25–21	25–21			75–62
19 Jan	Universidad San Martín	3–2	Géminis	21–25	25–16	25–18	19–25	15–11	105–95
22 Jan	Regatas Lima	3–0	Unión Vallejo Tarapoto	25–19	25–17	25–21			75–57
22 Jan	Alianza Lima	2–3	Sporting Cristal	16–25	25–23	9–25	25–15	12–15	87–103
24 Jan	Universidad César Vallejo	3–0	Unión Vallejo Tarapoto	25–6	25–12	25–13			75–21
24 Jan	Universidad San Martín	3–1	Sporting Cristal	25–19	21–25	25–21	25–11		96–76
25 Jan	Divino Maestro	3–2	Unión Vallejo Tarapoto	19–25	25–16	21–25	25–23	15–8	105–97
25 Jan	Circolo Sportivo Italiano	3–1	Regatas Lima	25–20	22–25	25–21	29–27		101–93
25 Jan	Géminis	3–0	Latino Amisa	25–17	25–16	25–20			75–53
26 Jan	Alianza Lima	3–0	Unión Vallejo Tarapoto	25–14	25–19	25–13			75–46
26 Jan	Sporting Cristal	3–0	Latino Amisa	25–15	25–18	25–14			75–47
26 Jan	Géminis	3–0	Túpac Amaru	25–18	25–17	25–20			75–55
29 Jan	Alianza Lima	3–0	Deportivo Wanka	25–14	25–16	25–22			75–52
29 Jan	Géminis	3–1	Circolo Sportivo Italiano	18–25	25–22	25–17	25–18		93–82
31 Jan	Universidad San Martín	3–0	Deportivo Wanka	25–14	25–15	25–18			75–47
31 Jan	Universidad César Vallejo	3–0	Regatas Lima	25–14	25–19	25–9			75–42
01 Feb	Túpac Amaru	3-0	Latino Amisa	25–18	29–27	25–15			79–60
01 Feb	Alianza Lima	3–0	Divino Maestro	26–24	25–11	25–12			76–47
01 Feb	Sporting Cristal	3–0	Circolo Sportivo Italiano	27–25	28–26	25–18			80–69
02 Feb	Universidad César Vallejo	3–0	Divino Maestro	25–17	25–8	25–14			75–39
02 Feb	Sporting Cristal	3–0	Túpac Amaru	25–11	25–14	25–15			75–40
02 Feb	Géminis	3–0	Regatas Lima	25–16	25–15	25–20			75–51
05 Feb	Universidad San Martín	3–0	Unión Vallejo Tarapoto	25–20	25–20	25–11			75–51
05 Feb	Deportivo Wanka	3–0	Latino Amisa	25–13	25–16	25–17			75–46
07 Feb	Latino Amisa	3–0	Unión Vallejo Tarapoto	25–19	25–13	25–20			75–52
07 Feb	Universidad San Martín	3–0	Divino Maestro	25–20	25–16	25–12			75–48
08 Feb	Deportivo Wanka	3–0	Unión Vallejo Tarapoto	25–13	25–11	25–19			75–43
09 Feb	Circolo Sportivo Italiano	3–0	Unión Vallejo Tarapoto	25–13	25–9	25–22			75–44
12 Feb	Circolo Sportivo Italiano	3–0	Divino Maestro	25–21	25–17	25–13			75–51
12 Feb	Universidad César Vallejo	3–0	Géminis	25–15	25–17	30–28			80–60
14 Feb	Circolo Sportivo Italiano	3–0	Deportivo Wanka	25–16	25–16	25–23			75–55
14 Feb	Sporting Cristal	3–0	Regatas Lima	25–16	25–20	25–20			75–56
15 Feb	Latino Amisa	3–1	Divino Maestro	25–21	25–12	23–25	25–18		98–76
15 Feb	Géminis	3–2	Sporting Cristal	27–25	25–22	22–25	17–25	15–11	106–108
16 Feb	Regatas Lima	3–2	Deportivo Wanka	20–25	25–23	25–23	23–25	15–11	108–107
16 Feb	Universidad César Vallejo	3–0	Alianza Lima	25–21	25–11	26–24			76–56
19 Feb	Géminis	3–0	Túpac Amaru	25–16	25–18	25–18			75–52
19 Feb	Universidad San Martín	3–1	Alianza Lima	25–19	25–19	21–25	25–23		96–86
21 Feb	Regatas Lima	3–2	Túpac Amaru	25–21	25–14	19–25	11–25	15–10	95–95
21 Feb	Universidad César Vallejo	3–2	Sporting Cristal	21–25	25–16	21–25	25–18	15–10	107–94
22 Feb	Alianza Lima	3–0	Latino Amisa	25–7	25–10	25–8			75–25
22 Feb	Géminis	3–0	Deportivo Wanka	25–17	25–19	25–22			75–58
23 Feb	Circolo Sportivo Italiano	3–0	Túpac Amaru	26–24	25–13	25–17			76–54
23 Feb	Universidad César Vallejo	3–2	Universidad San Martín	25–15	25–23	20–25	20–25	15–10	105–98

== Second stage ==
The second round of the tournament will see the best 8 teams from the first round compete in another Round-Robyn system, according to the finishing will be the play-offs. It began March 5, 2014 .

Pool standing procedure

1. Match points
2. Numbers of matches won
3. Sets ratio
4. Points ratio

Match won 3–0 or 3–1: 3 match points for the winner, 0 match points for the loser
Match won 3–2: 2 match points for the winner, 1 match point for the loser

Ranking

Pos	Team	Pld	W	L	Pts	SPW	SPL	SPR	SW	SL	SR	Qualification
1	Universidad César Vallejo	7	7	0	21	586	453	1.294	21	3	7.000	Quarterfinals
2	Sporting Cristal	7	6	1	17	431	563	0.766	19	8	2.375	Quarterfinals
3	Géminis	7	5	2	14	583	562	1.037	16	8	2.000	Quarterfinals
4	Universidad San Martín	7	4	3	12	581	528	1.100	15	8	1.875	Quarterfinals
5	Alianza Lima	7	3	4	10	396	519	0.763	11	12	0.917	Quarterfinals
6	Circolo Sportivo Italiano	7	2	5	7	539	569	0.947	9	16	0.563	Quarterfinals
7	Deportivo Wanka	7	1	6	2	467	580	0.805	3	20	0.150	Quarterfinals
8	Regatas Lima	7	0	7	1	483	617	0.783	5	21	0.238	Quarterfinals

=== Second Round, March 05 - April 04 ===
The second round consisted of 28 matches, with an average of six matches per week. Teams played seven matches during this round except for four teams that only played six.

Date		Score		Set 1	Set 2	Set 3	Set 4	Set 5	Total
05 Mar	Universidad San Martín	3–0	Regatas Lima	25–10	25–18	25–15			75–43
05 Mar	Sporting Cristal	3–1	Géminis	25–16	25–19	23–25	25–22		98–82
07 Mar	Universidad César Vallejo	3–0	Deportivo Wanka	25–16	25–13	25–21			75–50
07 Mar	Alianza Lima	3–0	Circolo Sportivo Italiano	25–19	25–19	25–21			75–59
12 Mar	Universidad César Vallejo	3–0	Regatas Lima	25–16	25–15	25–13			75–44
12 Mar	Sporting Cristal	3–0	Alianza Lima	25–23	26–24	25–10			76–57
14 Mar	Circolo Sportivo Italiano	3–0	Deportivo Wanka	25–19	28–26	25–18			78–63
14 Mar	Géminis	3–1	Regatas Lima	23–25	25–12	25–23	25–18		98–78
16 Mar	Sporting Cristal	3–1	Deportivo Wanka	23–25	25–13	25–15	25–22		98–75
16 Mar	Universidad San Martín	3–0	Alianza Lima	25–20	25–18	25–12			75–50
19 Mar	Universidad César Vallejo	3–1	Circolo Sportivo Italiano	25–15	23–25	25–20	25–20		98–80
19 Mar	Géminis	3–0	Universidad San Martín	25–23	25–17	25–23			75–63
21 Mar	Alianza Lima	3–0	Regatas Lima	25–23	25–18	25–21			75–62
21 Mar	Sporting Cristal	3–0	Circolo Sportivo Italiano	25–21	27–25	25–21			77–67
23 Mar	Universidad San Martín	3–0	Deportivo Wanka	29–27	25–15	25–15			79–57
23 Mar	Universidad César Vallejo	3–0	Géminis	25–22	25–21	25–20			75–63
26 Mar	Universidad San Martín	3–2	Circolo Sportivo Italiano	25–20	24–26	23–25	25–15	16–14	113–100
26 Mar	Universidad César Vallejo	3–1	Sporting Cristal	25–18	25–18	18–25	25–20		93–81
28 Mar	Deportivo Wanka	3–2	Regatas Lima	22–25	25–19	25–19	16–25	15–12	103–100
28 Mar	Géminis	3–2	Alianza Lima	24–26	21–25	25–15	25–20	20–18	115–104
29 Mar	Circolo Sportivo Italiano	3–1	Regatas Lima	25–14	25–15	22–25	25–14		97–68
29 Mar	Universidad San Martín	2–3	Sporting Cristal	14–25	25–19	23–25	25–23	14–16	101–108
30 Mar	Géminis	3–0	Deportivo Wanka	25–21	25–23	25–18			75–62
30 Mar	Universidad César Vallejo	3–0	Alianza Lima	25–18	25–19	25–23			75–60
02 Apr	Alianza Lima	3–0	Deportivo Wanka	25–23	25–18	25–16			75–57
02 Apr	Sporting Cristal	3–1	Regatas Lima	25–18	25–23	19–25	25–22		94–88
04 Apr	Géminis	3–0	Circolo Sportivo Italiano	25–22	25–18	25–17			75–57
04 Apr	Universidad César Vallejo	3–1	Universidad San Martín	25–13	25–23	20–25	25–14		95–75

== Consolation round ==
The consolation round of the tournament, will see the 4 losing from the first round compete in another Round-Robyn system, the best team will continue with their remaining. It began March 5, 2014.

Pool standing procedure

1. Match points
2. Numbers of matches won
3. Sets ratio
4. Points ratio

Match won 3–0 or 3–1: 3 match points for the winner, 0 match points for the loser
Match won 3–2: 2 match points for the winner, 1 match point for the loser

Ranking

Pos	Team	Pld	W	L	Pts	SPW	SPL	SPR	SW	SL	SR	Qualification
1	Túpac Amaru	3	3	0	9	267	206	1.296	9	2	4.500	
2	Latino Amisa	3	2	1	5	267	260	1.027	6	6	1.000	Relegation Hexagonal
3	Unión Vallejo Tarapoto	3	1	2	4	286	300	0.953	6	7	0.857	Relegation Hexagonal
4	Divino Maestro	3	0	3	0	233	287	0.812	3	9	0.333	Relegation Hexagonal

=== Consolation round, March 16–23 ===
The consolation round consisted of 6 matches. Teams played two matches during this round.

Date		Score		Set 1	Set 2	Set 3	Set 4	Set 5	Total	Report
16 Mar	Túpac Amaru	3–1	Unión Vallejo Tarapoto	25–22	21–25	25–18	25–14		96–79	
16 Mar	Latino Amisa	3–1	Divino Maestro	25–12	25–12	23–25	25–23		98–71	
22 Mar	Túpac Amaru	3–1	Divino Maestro	25–17	25–18	21–25	25–16		96–76	
22 Mar	Latino Amisa	3–2	Unión Vallejo Tarapoto	25–23	24–26	28–30	25–21	16–14	118–114	
23 Mar	Túpac Amaru	3–0	Latino Amisa	25–19	25–11	25–21			75–51	
23 Mar	Unión Vallejo Tarapoto	3–1	Divino Maestro	18–25	25–23	25–17	25–21		93–86	

== Final round ==
The final round of the tournament is a knockout stage, teams play the quarterfinals seeded according to how they finished ranking-wise in the second round. This round is played best-out-of-three games, for a team to move on to the next stage, they have to win twice against the opposite team.

Quarterfinals
Sporting Cristal	2
Deportivo Wanka	0
Géminis	2
Circolo Sportivo Italiano	0
Universidad San Martín	2
Alianza Lima	0
Universidad César Vallejo	2
Regatas Lima	0

Semifinals
Sporting Cristal	2
Géminis	0
Universidad San Martín	2
Universidad César Vallejo	0

Gold medal match
Universidad San Martín	2
Sporting Cristal	0
Bronze medal match
Universidad César Vallejo	2
Géminis	0

=== Quarterfinals ===
Team 1	Agg.	Team 2	1st leg	2nd leg
Sporting Cristal	2–0	Deportivo Wanka	3–0	3–0
Géminis	2–0	Circolo Sportivo Italiano	3–0	3–2
Universidad San Martín	2–0	Alianza Lima	3–0	3–0
Universidad César Vallejo	2–0	Regatas Lima	3–0	3–0

==== First leg ====
Date		Score		Set 1	Set 2	Set 3	Set 4	Set 5	Total
09 Apr	Deportivo Wanka	0–3	Sporting Cristal	12–25	15–25	23–25			46–75
09 Apr	Géminis	3–0	Circolo Sportivo Italiano	25–19	26–24	25–23			76–66
11 Apr	Universidad San Martín	3–0	Alianza Lima	25–18	25–13	25–15			75–46
11 Apr	Universidad César Vallejo	3–0	Regatas Lima	25–19	25–17	25–14			75–60

==== Second leg ====
Date		Score		Set 1	Set 2	Set 3	Set 4	Set 5	Total
12 Apr	Deportivo Wanka	0–3	Sporting Cristal	17–25	15–25	14–25			46–75
12 Apr	Géminis	3-2	Circolo Sportivo Italiano	25–22	21–25	23–25	25–15	15–8	109–95
13 Apr	Universidad San Martín	3–0	Alianza Lima	26–24	25–15	25–16			76–55
13 Apr	Universidad César Vallejo	3–0	Regatas Lima	25–15	25–21	25–23			75–59

=== Semifinals ===
Team 1	Agg.	Team 2	1st leg	2nd leg
Sporting Cristal	2–0	Géminis	3–2	3–0
Universidad San Martín	2–0	Universidad César Vallejo	3–2	3–2

==== First leg ====
Date		Score		Set 1	Set 2	Set 3	Set 4	Set 5	Total
18 Apr	Sporting Cristal	3–2	Géminis	23–25	25–21	25–17	20–25	15–13	108–101
18 Apr	Universidad San Martín	3–2	Universidad César Vallejo	25–22	16–25	17–25	25–22	15–13	118–107

==== Second leg ====
Date		Score		Set 1	Set 2	Set 3	Set 4	Set 5	Total
18 Apr	Sporting Cristal	3–0	Géminis	25–19	25–20	25–15			75–54
18 Apr	Universidad San Martín	3–2	Universidad César Vallejo	11–25	25–12	18–25	25–14	15–12	94–88

=== Bronze Medal Matches ===
Team 1	Agg.	Team 2	1st leg	2nd leg
Universidad César Vallejo	2–0	Géminis	3–1	3–2

==== First leg ====
Date		Score		Set 1	Set 2	Set 3	Set 4	Set 5	Total	Report
23 Abr	Universidad César Vallejo	3–1	Géminis	25–19	22–25	25–23	25–23		97–90	

==== Second leg ====
Date		Score		Set 1	Set 2	Set 3	Set 4	Set 5	Total	Report
25 Abr	Universidad César Vallejo	3–2	Géminis	20–25	25–19	19–25	25–19	15–12	104–100	

=== Gold Medal Matches ===
Team 1	Agg.	Team 2	1st leg	2nd leg
Universidad San Martín	2–0	Sporting Cristal	3–1	3–1

==== First leg ====
Date		Score		Set 1	Set 2	Set 3	Set 4	Set 5	Total	Report
23 Abr	Universidad San Martín	3–1	Sporting Cristal	23–25	34–32	25–22	25–15		107–94	

==== Second leg ====
Date		Score		Set 1	Set 2	Set 3	Set 4	Set 5	Total	Report
25 Abr	Universidad San Martín	3–1	Sporting Cristal	25–18	25–23	23–25	25–17		98–83	

== Final standing ==
Rank	Team
1st place, gold medalist(s)	Universidad San Martín
2nd place, silver medalist(s)	Sporting Cristal
3rd place, bronze medalist(s)	Universidad César Vallejo
4	Géminis
5	Alianza Lima
6	Circolo Sportivo Italiano
7	Deportivo Wanka
8	Regatas Lima
9	Túpac Amaru
10	Latino Amisa
11	Divino Maestro
12	Unión Vallejo Tarapoto

Team qualified for the 2015 South American Club Championship
Team lost A1 category

2013–14 Liga Nacional Superior de Voleibol ;

Universidad San Martín
1st title

Team Roster:

Jadranka Budrovic, Daniela Uribe, Patricia Soto, Milca Da Silva, Leslie Leyva, Yulissa Zamudio (C), Elizabeth Millan, Zoila La Rosa, Andrea Urrutia, Ángela Leyva, Janice Torres (L) Zaira Manso,

Head Coach: Juan Diego García

== Awards ==
=== All-Star Team ===
- Most valuable player
  - (Brazil) Milca Da Silva (Universidad San Martín)
- Best Outside Hitters
  - (Peru) Karla Ortiz (Sporting Cristal)
  - (Peru) Carla Rueda (Géminis)
- Best setter
  - (Peru) Zoila La Rosa (Universidad San Martín)
- Best Opposite
  - (Peru) Maguilaura Frias (Sporting Cristal)
- Best Middle-Blockers
  - (Brazil) Wivian Gadelha (Géminis)
  - (Peru) Clarivett Yllescas (Universidad César Vallejo)
- Best libero
  - (Peru) María de Fátima Acosta (Géminis)

=== Individual awards ===
- Best scorer
  - (Brazil) Milca Da Silva (Universidad San Martín)
- Best spiker
  - (Peru) Maguilaura Frias (Sporting Cristal)
- Best blocker
  - (Brazil) Wivian Gadelha (Géminis)
- Best server
  - (Dominican Republic) Jeoselyna Rodríguez (Universidad César Vallejo)
- Best digger
  - (Peru) María de Fátima Acosta (Géminis)
- Best Setting
  - (Peru) Shiamara Almeida (Sporting Cristal)
- Best receiver
  - (Peru) Susan Egoavil (Sporting Cristal)
