= Alicia Ogoms =

Canadian volleyball player (born 1994)

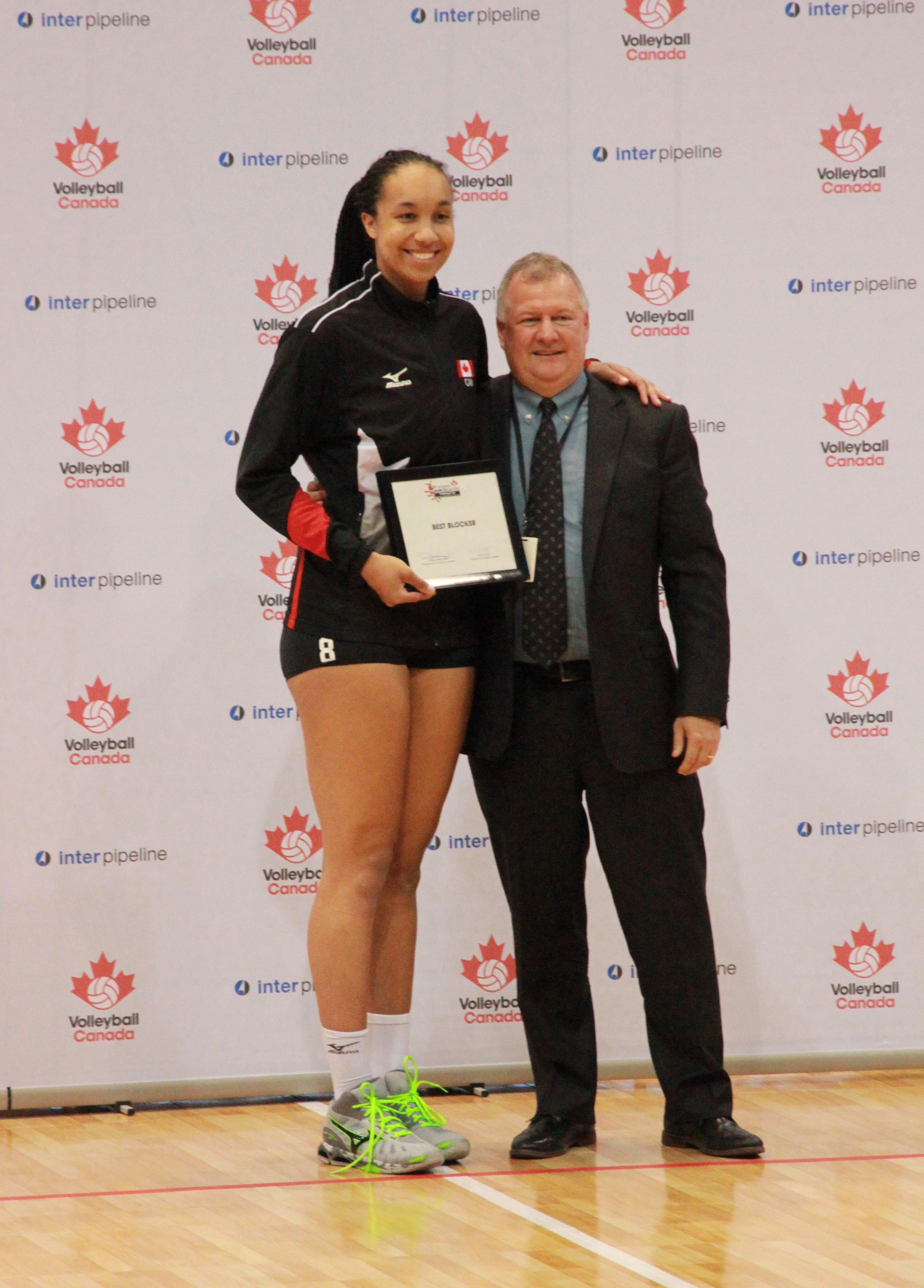
- Ogoms in 2018

Personal information
- Nationality: Canada
- Born: 2 April 1994 (age 32); Winnipeg, Canada
- Hometown: Winnipeg
- Height: 1.94 m (6 ft 4 in)
- Education: Southern California

Volleyball information
- Position: Position 4

Career
Years	Teams
2017	(Poland) PTPS Piła
2018	(Italy) SAB Volley
2019	(Poland) MKS Kalisz
2020	(Poland) BKS Bielsko-Biała
2021	(Italy) Azzurra Volley Firenze
2021–22	(Italy) Bergamo
2022–23	(France) Terville Florange Olympique Club
2023–24	(France) Béziers Angels

National team
2014–	Canada

Alicia Shanice Ogoms (born 2 April 1994) is a Canadian volleyball player. She is a member of the Canada women's national volleyball team, and participated in several tournaments for the national team including the 2017 FIVB Volleyball Women's World Grand Prix, 2018 FIVB Volleyball Women's World Championship, 2019 Women's Challenge Cup, 2020 NORCECA Women's Tokyo Qualification Tournament, 2021 Nations League, 2022 Nations League, 2022 World Championships. She played for the University of Southern California before graduating in 2016 with a degree in policy, planning, and development.

== Clubs ==
- 2017 – (Poland) PTPS Piła
- 2018 – (Italy) SAB Volley
- 2019 – (Poland) MKS Kalisz
- 2020 – (Poland) Bjelsko Biala
- 2021 – (Italy) Azzurra Volley Firenze
- 2021–22 – (Italy) Volley Bergamo
- 2022–23 – (France) Terville Florange Olympique Club
