= Cindy Rondón =

Dominican volleyball player

Personal information
- Full name: Cindy Carolina Rondón Martínez
- Nationality: Dominican Republic
- Born: 12 November 1988 (age 37); Santo Domingo
- Hometown: Santo Domingo
- Height: 1.86 m (6 ft 1 in)
- Weight: 61 kg (134 lb)
- Spike: 320 cm (130 in)
- Block: 315 cm (124 in)

Volleyball information
- Position: Middle blocker / Opposite spiker
- Current club: (Peru) Deportivo Géminis
- Number: 13

National team
2007 –	Dominican Republic
Honours
Women's volleyball
Representing the Dominican Republic
Pan-American Cup
Gold medal – first place	2010 Rosarito/Tijuana	Team
Gold medal – first place	2008 Mexicali/Tijuana	Team
Silver medal – second place	2011 Ciudad Juárez	Team
Silver medal – second place	2005 Santo Domingo	Team
Bronze medal – third place	2007 Colima	Team
NORCECA Championship
Bronze medal – third place	2005 Port of Spain	Team
Bronze medal – third place	2007 Winnipeg	Team
Central American and Caribbean Games
Gold medal – first place	2006 Cartagena	Team
Gold medal – first place	2010 Mayagüez	Team
Final Four Cup
Gold medal – first place	2010 Chiapas	Team
Silver medal – second place	2008 Fortaleza	Team
- Last updated: March 2011

Cindy Carolina Rondón Martínez (born 12 November 1988 in Santo Domingo) is a volleyball player from the Dominican Republic, who twice won the bronze medal with the Dominican women's national team at the NORCECA Championship.

== Career ==
=== 2005–2011 ===
Playing as a middle blocker, Rondón was named "Best blocker" at the 2005 NORCECA Championship. She was signed by the Italian club BigMat Kerakoll Chieri and transferred on loan to Megius Padova.

At the 2006 TV Azteca's Women Stars Volleyball Cup, she won the "Best spiker" award and the gold medal with her team. She won the "Best blocker" of the 2007 season of the LVSF with Vaqueras de Bayamón and was also selected for the All-Star game. She played for Denso Airybees from 2007/2008 until 2008/2009, when she suffered an injury and had a vertebra replacement. Playing in Chiapas, Mexico with her National Senior Team she won the 2010 Final Four Cup gold medal.

=== 2013–present ===
Rondón signed for the 2012/13 season with Peruvian club Deportivo Géminis to play the Liga Nacional Superior de Voleibol. She was signed as replacement player of fellow Dominican player Lisvel Elisa Eve after Eve suffered an exposed tibia and fibula fracture while playing a match for the Peruvian team.

== Clubs ==
- (Dominican Republic) Deportivo Nacional (2003)
- (Dominican Republic) Bameso (2004)
- (Dominican Republic) Modeca (2005)
- (Italy) Megius Volley Padova (2005–2006)
- (Puerto Rico) Vaqueras de Bayamón (2007)
- (Japan) Denso Airybees (2007–2009)
- (Dominican Republic) Distrito Nacional (2010)
- (Dominican Republic) Mirador (2010–2012)
- (Peru) Deportivo Géminis (2013)
- (Peru) Deportivo Géminis (2014–2015)

== Awards ==
=== Individuals ===
- 2005 NORCECA Championship "Best blocker"
- 2006 TV Azteca's Women Stars Volleyball Cup "Best spiker"
- 2007 Puerto Rican League "Best blocker"
- 2007 Puerto Rican League All-Star
- 2007 Pan-American Games "Best blocker"
- 2008 Pan-American Cup "Best blocker"
- 2015 Liga Nacional Superior de Voleibol Femenino "Best outside hitter"
- 2015 Liga Nacional Superior de Voleibol Femenino "Best scorer"
- 2015 Liga Nacional Superior de Voleibol Femenino "MVP"
