= 2014 Women's Junior South American Volleyball Championship =

South American Volleyball Championship organised by the CSV

Tournament details
- Host country: Colombia
- Dates: 29 September to 5 October
- Teams: 6
- Venue: 1 (in Barrancabermeja host cities)

Final positions
- Champions: Brazil (18th title)

Tournament awards
- MVP: Drussyla Costa (BRA)

The 2014 Women's Junior South American Volleyball Championship was the 22nd edition of the tournament, organised by South America's governing volleyball body, the Confederación Sudamericana de Voleibol (CSV). The top two teams qualified for the 2015 Junior World Championship.

== Competing nations ==
The following national teams participated in the tournament, teams were seeded according to how they finished in the previous edition of the tournament:

Pool A

Argentina
Brazil
Chile
Colombia
Peru
~~Venezuela~~ (withdrew)

== Competition format ==
The championship consisted of a single round-robin pool between the six teams, the champion was determined from the ranking after the round.

== Competition ==
- All times are Colombia Standard Time (UTC-5)

| Pos | Team | Pld | W | L | Pts | SW | SL | SR | SPW | SPL | SPR |
|---|---|---|---|---|---|---|---|---|---|---|---|
| 1 | Brazil | 4 | 4 | 0 | 12 | 12 | 1 | 12.000 | 324 | 216 | 1.500 |
| 2 | Peru | 4 | 3 | 1 | 8 | 10 | 7 | 1.429 | 368 | 373 | 0.987 |
| 3 | Argentina | 4 | 2 | 2 | 5 | 7 | 8 | 0.875 | 314 | 336 | 0.935 |
| 4 | Chile | 4 | 1 | 3 | 3 | 4 | 9 | 0.444 | 273 | 308 | 0.886 |
| 5 | Colombia | 4 | 0 | 4 | 2 | 4 | 12 | 0.333 | 303 | 347 | 0.873 |

| Date | Time | | Score | | Set 1 | Set 2 | Set 3 | Set 4 | Set 5 | Total |
|---|---|---|---|---|---|---|---|---|---|---|
| 30-Sep | 18:00 | Peru | 3–1 | Chile | 25–18 | 25–14 | 23–25 | 25–20 | | 98–77 |
| 30-Sep | 20:00 | Colombia | 0–3 | Brazil | 19–25 | 6–25 | 19–25 | | | 44–75 |
| 01-Oct | 18:00 | Brazil | 3–1 | Peru | 25-17 | 24-26 | 25-15 | 25-17 | | 99-75 |
| 01-Oct | 20:00 | Argentina | 3–0 | Chile | 27-25 | 26-24 | 26-24 | | | 79-73 |
| 02-Oct | 18:00 | Peru | 3–1 | Argentina | 25-19 | 26-24 | 17-25 | 25-21 | | 93-89 |
| 02-Oct | 20:00 | Chile | 3–0 | Colombia | 25-20 | 25-18 | 25-18 | | | 75-56 |
| 03-Oct | 18:00 | Brazil | 3–0 | Chile | 25-19 | 25-19 | 25-10 | | | 75-48 |
| 03-Oct | 20:00 | Colombia | 2–3 | Argentina | 18-25 | 11-25 | 25-20 | 25-15 | 10-15 | 89-100 |
| 04-Oct | 18:00 | Colombia | 2–3 | Peru | 20-25 | 24-26 | 25-16 | 25-19 | 14-16 | 108-102 |
| 04-Oct | 20:00 | Brazil | 3–0 | Argentina | 25–14 | 25–22 | 25–18 | | | 75-54 |

== Final standing ==
| Rank | Team |
|---|---|
| 1st place, gold medalist(s) | Brazil |
| 2nd place, silver medalist(s) | Peru |
| 3rd place, bronze medalist(s) | Argentina |
| 4 | Chile |
| 5 | Colombia |

| Qualified for the 2015 Junior World Championship |

2014 Women's Junior South American Volleyball Championship

Brazil
18th title

== All-Star Team ==
- Most valuable player
  - Drussyla Costa (BRA)
- Best Opposite
  - Maguilaura Frias (PER)
- Best outside hitters
  - Irene Verasio (ARG)
  - Amanda Coneo (COL)
- Best middle blockers
  - Layza Ferreira (BRA)
  - Andrea Urrutia (PER)
- Best setter
  - Thais de Oliveira (BRA)
- Best libero
  - Lais Vasques (BRA)
