= Amanda Coneo =

Colombian volleyball player (born 1996)

Personal information
- Full name: Amanda Daniela Coneo Cardona
- Nationality: Colombian
- Born: 20 December 1996 (age 29) Cartagena, Colombia
- Height: 177 cm (5 ft 10 in)
- Weight: 63 kg (139 lb)
- Spike: 314 cm (124 in)
- Block: 289 cm (114 in)

Volleyball information
- Position: Outside hitter
- Current club: (Greece) Olympiacos SF Piraeus
- Number: 20

Career
- Years: Team
- 2013-2014: (Peru) Tupac Amaru
- 2014-2015: (Bolivia) Liga Bolivarense
- 2015-2016: (Italy) Lardini Filottrano
- 2016-2018: (Italy) SAB Volley Legnano
- 2018-2019: (Italy) Barricalla Torino
- 2019-2020: (France) RC Cannes
- 2020-2021: (France) Pays d'Aix Venelles
- 2021-2023: (France) Mulhouse Alsace
- 2023-2024: (Poland) Developres Rzeszów
- 2024-2025: (Japan) Denso Airybees Kōriyama
- 2025-: (Greece) Olympiacos Piraeus

National team
- Years: Team
- 2015: Colombia
Honours
Women's volleyball
Representing Colombia
Pan American Games
| Silver medal – second place | 2019 Lima | Team |
South American Championship
| Silver medal – second place | 2017 Cali |
| Silver medal – second place | 2019 Cajamarca |
| Silver medal – second place | 2021 Barrancabermeja |
| Bronze medal – third place | 2015 Cartagena |
Bolivarian Games
| Bronze medal – third place | 2013 Trujillo | Team |
- Updated on 5 November 2025

Amanda Daniela Coneo Cardona (born 20 December 1996) is a Colombian volleyball player. She is part of the Colombia national team. On club level she plays in Hellenic Volley League for Olympiacos Piraeus.

== Career ==
She won the silver medal in the 2011 Colombia Junior Championship, representing Bolivar.

=== 2012 ===
Coneo participated in the 2012 Pan-American Cup in the senior category as a warm up for the 2012 Colombian National Games and also part of the Bolivar Ganador development program. Colombia finished the competition in the eleventh place, with just one victory, achieved in the las match against Mexico. She played the 2012 South American Girls championship, ranking in fifth place.

=== 2013 ===
In April, Coneo traveled to Guatemala to play the 2013 Youth Pan-American Cup ending up in seventh place. She won the 2013 Colombian Championship in the senior category with Bolivar. She won the 2013 Bolivarian Games bronze medal with her national team.

=== 2014 ===
Coneo played the 2013-14 Peruvian League with the club Tupac Amaru. She helped the Colombian national team to qualify for the first time to the FIVB World Grand Prix by reaching the 2014 Pan-American Cup seventh place. Later, she won the 2014 U22 South American Championship silver medal and Best Outside Hitter award and later the 2014 Junior South American Championship Best Outside Hitter award and her team finished in fifth place. Coneo won the silver medal in the 2014 U23 Pan-American Cup held in Peru, when they lost the gold medal match 1–3 to the Dominican Republic. She helped her national team to end up in the sixth place in the volleyball tournament held in the 2014 Central American and Caribbean Games in Veracruz, Mexico. With Liga Bolivarense, she won the 2014 Colombian National Championship in the senior and junior category.

=== 2015 ===
During the 2015 Pan-American Cup, Coneo ranked third among the scorers with 124 points, nonetheless, her national team finished in eight place. She played in August the 2015 FIVB U23 World Championship where Colombia ranked tied in ninth place. She participated in the 2015 FIVB World Grand Prix, reaching the Group 3 Final Four and winning the group bronze medal. With Liga Bolivarense she claimed the 2015 National Games championship over the Antioquia team. Coneo was selected to play the 2015 South American Championship winning the bronze medal with her national team.

=== 2016 ===
In January 2016, she joined the Italian club Lardini Filottrano. In May 2016, she played the 2016 Summer Olympics qualifier tournament in Puerto Rico, where her team failed the berth to the 2016 Summer Olympics after ranking second in the tournament. Coneo participated in the 2016 FIVB Volleyball World Grand Prix qualifying to the Final Four, but losing the bronze medal match 2–3 to Peru. With her national U22 team, she won the 2016 U22 South American Championship silver medal. She signed for the Italian club Sab Grima Legnano from the A2 Championship and became the first foreign player playing for them.

=== 2017 ===
Coneo played the 2017 FIVB Volleyball World Grand Prix group 2 and ranked in seventh place and 19th overall. She won the 2017 Colombian Senior Championship as the captain of the Bolivar team, their fifth championship. She played with her national senior team the 2017 South American Championship, winning the silver medal when they lost 0–3 to Brazil. She played in October the 2018 FIVB World Championship CSV qualification tournament, but her team could not get a berth for next year competition. After an Italian A2 season where she scored 424 points, she re-signed with the Italian club Sab Volley Legnano for the 2017/18 season.

== Personal life ==
Coneo was born in Cartagena, Colombia on 20 December 1996. As of 2016 she was a Psychology student. Her parents are Gabriel and Rocio and she has two siblings, Zuleima and Gabriela, who also played volleyball with the national team.

== Awards ==
=== Individuals ===
- 2014 U22 South American Championship "Best Outside Spiker"
- 2014 Junior South American Championship "Best Outside Spiker"
- 2021 South American Championship – "Best Outside Spiker"

=== Clubs ===
- 2014 Colombian Championship – Champion, with Liga Bolivarense
- 2017 Colombian Championship – Champion, with Liga Bolivarense
- 2019 French Super Cup – Cup winner, with RC Cannes
- 2021 French Super Cup – Cup winner, with Mulhouse Alsace
- 2022 French Super Cup – Cup winner, with Mulhouse Alsace
