= SAB Volley =

SAB Volley Legnano
- Full name: SAB Volley
- Founded: 2015
- Dissolved: 2018
- Ground: PalaBorsani, Castellanza, Italy (Capacity: 1,650)
- League: FIPAV Women's Serie A1
- Website: Club home page

Uniforms
Home	Away

SAB Volley was an Italian women's volleyball club based in Legnano. The club played in the Serie A1 in 2017–2018.

== Previous names ==
Due to sponsorship, the club have competed under the following names:

- SAB Grima Irge (2015–2016)
- SAB Grima Legnano (2016–2017)
- SAB Volley Legnano (2017–2018)

== History ==
The club was based in Gallarate when founded in 2015 and played in group A of the Serie B1 in 2015–16. Ahead of the 2016–17 season, it acquired Neruda Volley licence to play the Serie A2. The club moved its base to Legnano and renew a contract to continue to play at the PalaBorsani for three seasons.

The club finished its first Serie A2 season (in 2016–17) in third place during the regular season, qualifying for the Serie A1 promotion playoffs, reaching the final. Despite missing the promotion, the club submitted its participation for the following season at Serie A2 with a request to be on a waiting list for the Serie A1. On 16 July 2017, the Serie A League confirmed that SAB Volley would participate in the Serie A1 2017–18 season.

SAB Volley finished its debut season in Serie A1 in last place and was relegated to Serie A2 again. Following the failed season the club is dissolved in 2018.

== Team ==
Season 2017–2018, as of September 2017.

Number	Player	Position	Height (m)	Weight (kg)	Birth date
2	(Italy) Alice Degradi	Outside Hitter	1.81	75	10 April 1996 (age 29)
3	(Italy) Giulia Bartesaghi	Outside Hitter	1.87		5 September 1998 (age 27)
5	(Italy) Silvia Lussana	Libero	1.69		30 October 1988 (age 36)
6	(Slovakia) Jaroslava Pencová	Middle Blocker	1.91	79	24 June 1990 (age 35)
7	(Italy) Maria Luisa Cumino	Setter	1.77		22 April 1992 (age 33)
8	(Canada) Alicia Ogoms	Middle Blocker	1.94	82	2 April 1994 (age 31)
9	(Italy) Camilla Mingardi	Opposite	1.86		19 October 1997 (age 27)
10	(Italy) Melissa Martinelli	Middle Blocker	1.85		23 March 1993 (age 32)
11	(Colombia) Amanda Coneo	Outside Hitter	1.77	58	20 December 1996 (age 28)
12	(Italy) Giada Cecchetto	Libero	1.63		6 June 1991 (age 34)
14	(Italy) Valeria Caracuta	Setter	1.73	61	14 December 1987 (age 37)
16	(United States) Sonja Newcombe	Outside Hitter	1.88	76	7 March 1988 (age 37)
18	(United States) Annie Drews	Opposite	1.91	77	25 December 1993 (age 31)

2016–2017 Team
Number	Player	Position	Height (m)	Weight (kg)	Birth date
1	(Italy) Francesca Figini	Middle blocker	1.86		25 February 1995 (age 30)
2	(Italy) Sara Paris	Libero	1.65	60	19 July 1985 (age 40)
5	(Italy) Eleonora Furlan	Middle blocker	1.88		10 March 1995 (age 30)
7	(Italy) Chiara Muzi	Outside hitter	1.86		23 October 1998 (age 26)
9	(Italy) Camilla Mingardi	Opposite	1.81		19 October 1997 (age 27)
11	(Colombia) Amanda Coneo	Outside hitter	1.77	58	20 December 1996 (age 28)
12	(Italy) Laura Grigolo	Outside hitter	1.82		1 March 1996 (age 29)
13	(Italy) Fabiola Facchinetti	Middle blocker	1.82		30 April 1989 (age 36)
15	(Italy) Dayana Kosareva	Outside hitter	1.86		24 August 1999 (age 26)
16	(Italy) Martina Bossi	Libero	1.70		6 November 1997 (age 27)
17	(Italy) Sara De Lellis	Setter	1.81		14 November 1986 (age 38)
18	(Italy) Bianca Mazzotti	Setter	1.83		12 November 1998 (age 26)
