= 2017 Women's South American Volleyball Club Championship =

Tournament details
- Host country: Brazil
- Dates: 14–18 February 2017
- Teams: 6
- Venues: 2 (in Uberaba / Uberlândia host cities)

Final positions
- Champions: (Brazil) Rexona-Sesc (4th title)

Tournament awards
- MVP: (Brazil) Gabriela Guimarães (Rexona-Sesc)

The 2017 Women's South American Volleyball Club Championship was the ninth official edition of the women's volleyball tournament, played by six teams from 14 to 18 February 2017 in Uberaba and Uberlândia, Brazil. Rio de Janeiro won its third consecutive title, the fourth overall, and qualified for the 2017 FIVB Volleyball Women's Club World Championship in Kobe, Japan. Gabriela Guimarães was elected the Most Valuable Player.

== Competing clubs ==
Teams were seeded in two pools of three according to how the representatives of their countries finished in the 2016 edition.

Pool A	Pool B
(Brazil) Praia (Argentina) Villa Dora (Bolivia) Olympic	(Brazil) Rexona-Sesc (Argentina) Boca Juniors (Peru) Universidad San Martín

== Preliminary round ==
=== Pool A ===
Pos	Team	Pld	W	L	Pts	SW	SL	SR	SPW	SPL	SPR	Qualification
1	(Brazil) Praia	2	2	0	6	6	0	MAX	150	53	2.830	Semifinals
2	(Argentina) Villa Dora	2	1	1	3	3	3	1.000	114	117	0.974	Semifinals
3	(Bolivia) Olympic	2	0	2	0	0	6	0.000	56	150	0.373	

Date		Score		Set 1	Set 2	Set 3	Set 4	Set 5	Total
14 Feb	Villa Dora (Argentina)	3–0	(Bolivia) Olympic	25–6	25–17	25–19			75–42
15 Feb	Praia (Brazil)	3–0	(Bolivia) Olympic	25–2	25–6	25–6			75–14
16 Feb	Praia (Brazil)	3–0	(Argentina) Villa Dora	25–15	25–11	25–13			75–39

=== Pool B ===
Pos	Team	Pld	W	L	Pts	SW	SL	SR	SPW	SPL	SPR	Qualification
1	(Brazil) Rexona-Sesc	2	2	0	6	6	0	MAX	150	76	1.974	Semifinals
2	(Peru) Universidad San Martín	2	1	1	3	3	3	1.000	118	137	0.861	Semifinals
3	(Argentina) Boca Juniors	2	0	2	0	0	6	0.000	95	150	0.633	

Date		Score		Set 1	Set 2	Set 3	Set 4	Set 5	Total
14 Feb	Rexona-Sesc (Brazil)	3–0	(Argentina) Boca Juniors	25–17	25–8	25–8			75–33
15 Feb	Universidad San Martín (Peru)	3–0	(Argentina) Boca Juniors	25–22	25–18	25–22			75–62
16 Feb	Rexona-Sesc (Brazil)	3–0	(Peru) Universidad San Martín	25–16	25–11	25–16			75–43

== Final round ==
=== Bracket ===
Semifinals
17 February
(Brazil) Rexona-Sesc	3
(Argentina) Villa Dora	0
17 February
(Brazil) Praia	3
(Peru) Universidad San Martín	0

Final
18 February
(Brazil) Praia	1
(Brazil) Rexona-Sesc	3
3rd place
18 February
(Argentina) Villa Dora	0
(Peru) Universidad San Martín	3

=== Fifth place match ===
Date		Score		Set 1	Set 2	Set 3	Set 4	Set 5	Total
18 Feb	Olympic (Bolivia)	1–3	(Argentina) Boca Juniors	25–20	12–25	18–25	12–25		67–95

=== Semifinals ===
Date		Score		Set 1	Set 2	Set 3	Set 4	Set 5	Total
17 Feb	Rexona-Sesc (Brazil)	3–0	(Argentina) Villa Dora	25–10	25–6	25–17			75–33
17 Feb	Praia (Brazil)	3–0	(Peru) Universidad San Martín	25–18	25–23	25–13			75–54

=== Third place match ===
Date		Score		Set 1	Set 2	Set 3	Set 4	Set 5	Total
18 Feb	Villa Dora (Argentina)	0–3	(Peru) Universidad San Martín	20–25	29–31	17–25			66–81

=== Final ===
Date		Score		Set 1	Set 2	Set 3	Set 4	Set 5	Total
18 Feb	Praia (Brazil)	1–3	(Brazil) Rexona-Sesc	19–25	25–20	19–25	11–25		74–95

== Final standing ==
Rank	Team
1st place, gold medalist(s)	(Brazil) Rexona-Sesc
2nd place, silver medalist(s)	(Brazil) Praia
3rd place, bronze medalist(s)	(Peru) Universidad San Martín
4	(Argentina) Villa Dora
5	(Argentina) Boca Juniors
6	(Bolivia) Olympic

Qualified for the 2017 FIVB Volleyball Women's Club World Championship

2017 Women's South American Volleyball Club Champions

4th title

== All-Star team ==
- Most valuable player
  - (Brazil) Gabriela Guimarães (Rexona-Sesc)
- Best Opposite
  - (Brazil) Monique Pavão (Rexona-Sesc)
- Best Outside Hitters
  - (United States) Alix Klineman (Praia)
  - (Peru) Ángela Leyva (Universidad San Martín)
- Best setter
  - (Brazil) Roberta Ratzke (Rexona-Sesc)
- Best Middle Blockers
  - (Brazil) Fabiana Claudino (Praia)
  - (Brazil) Walewska Oliveira (Praia)
- Best libero
  - (Brazil) Fabiana de Oliveira (Rexona-Sesc)

== See also ==
- 2017 Men's South American Volleyball Club Championship
