= 2016 Women's South American Volleyball Club Championship =

Tournament details
- Host country: Argentina
- Dates: 24 – 28 February 2016
- Teams: 6
- Venue: 1 (in La Plata host cities)

Final positions
- Champions: (Brazil) Rexona Ades (3rd title)

Tournament awards
- MVP: Ana Carolina da Silva (BRA)

The 2016 Women's South American Volleyball Club Championship was the eighth official edition of the women's volleyball tournament, played by six teams from 24 – 28 February 2016 in La Plata, Argentina. The Brazilian club Rexona Ades claimed their third title defeating the Universidad San Martín, from Peru, by 3–0 in the final match.

== Competing clubs ==
Teams were seeded in two pools of three according to how the representatives of their countries finished in the 2015 edition.

Pool A	Pool B
(Argentina) Villa Dora (Peru) Universidad San Martín (Uruguay) Juan Ferreira	(Argentina) Gimnasia y Esgrima (LP) (Bolivia) Olympic (Brazil) Rexona Ades

== Preliminary round ==
=== Pool A ===
Pos	Team	Pld	W	L	Pts	SW	SL	SR	SPW	SPL	SPR	Qualification
1	(Peru) Universidad San Martín	2	2	0	6	6	0	MAX	150	113	1.327	Semifinals
2	(Argentina) Villa Dora	2	1	1	3	3	3	1.000	135	129	1.047	Semifinals
3	(Uruguay) Juan Ferreira	2	0	2	0	0	6	0.000	107	150	0.713	

Date		Score		Set 1	Set 2	Set 3	Set 4	Set 5	Total
24 Feb	Villa Dora (Argentina)	3–0	(Uruguay) Juan Ferreira	25–17	25–19	25–18			75–54
25 Feb	Universidad San Martín (Peru)	3–0	(Uruguay) Juan Ferreira	25–22	25–13	25–18			75–53
26 Feb	Villa Dora (Argentina)	0–3	(Peru) Universidad San Martín	21–25	17–25	22–25			60–75

=== Pool B ===
Pos	Team	Pld	W	L	Pts	SW	SL	SR	SPW	SPL	SPR	Qualification
1	(Brazil) Rexona Ades	2	2	0	6	6	0	MAX	150	56	2.679	Semifinals
2	(Argentina) Gimnasia y Esgrima (LP)	2	1	1	3	3	3	1.000	100	121	0.826	Semifinals
3	(Bolivia) Olympic	2	0	2	0	0	6	0.000	77	150	0.513	

Date		Score		Set 1	Set 2	Set 3	Set 4	Set 5	Total
24 Feb	Rexona Ades (Brazil)	3–0	(Argentina) Gimnasia y Esgrima (LP)	25–8	25–8	25–9			75–25
25 Feb	Olympic (Bolivia)	0–3	(Argentina) Gimnasia y Esgrima (LP)	9–25	14–25	23–25			46–75
26 Feb	Rexona Ades (Brazil)	3–0	(Bolivia) Olympic	25–11	25–7	25–13			75–31

== Final round ==
=== Bracket ===
Semifinals
27 February
(Peru) Universidad San Martín	3
(Argentina) Gimnasia y Esgrima (LP)	1
27 February
(Brazil) Rexona Ades	3
(Argentina) Villa Dora	0

Final
28 February
(Peru) Universidad San Martín	0
(Brazil) Rexona Ades	3
3rd place
28 February
(Argentina) Gimnasia y Esgrima (LP)	1
(Argentina) Villa Dora	3

=== Fifth place match ===
Date		Score		Set 1	Set 2	Set 3	Set 4	Set 5	Total
27 Feb	Juan Ferreira (Uruguay)	3–0	(Bolivia) Olympic	25–19	25–19	25–20			75–58

=== Semifinals ===
Date		Score		Set 1	Set 2	Set 3	Set 4	Set 5	Total
27 Feb	Rexona Ades (Brazil)	3–0	(Argentina) Villa Dora	25–14	25–13	25–16			75–43
27 Feb	Universidad San Martín (Peru)	3–1	(Argentina) Gimnasia y Esgrima (LP)	25–20	24–26	25–23	27–25		101–94

=== Third place match ===
Date		Score		Set 1	Set 2	Set 3	Set 4	Set 5	Total
28 Feb	Gimnasia y Esgrima (LP) (Argentina)	1–3	(Argentina) Villa Dora	27–25	15–25	21–25	15–25		78–100

=== Final ===
Date		Score		Set 1	Set 2	Set 3	Set 4	Set 5	Total
28 Feb	Universidad San Martín (Peru)	0–3	(Brazil) Rexona Ades	16–25	22–25	17–25			55–75

== Final standing ==
Rank	Team
1st place, gold medalist(s)	(Brazil) Rexona Ades
2nd place, silver medalist(s)	(Peru) Universidad San Martín
3rd place, bronze medalist(s)	(Argentina) Villa Dora
4	(Argentina) Gimnasia y Esgrima (LP)
5	(Uruguay) Juan Ferreira
6	(Bolivia) Olympic

Qualified for the 2016 FIVB Volleyball Women's Club World Championship

2016 Women's South American Volleyball Club Champions

3rd title

== All-Star team ==
- Most valuable player
  - (Brazil) Ana Carolina da Silva (Rexona Ades)
- Best Opposite
  - (Argentina) Micaela Fabiani (Villa Dora)
- Best Outside Hitters
  - (Peru) Ángela Leyva (Universidad San Martín)
  - (Brazil) Gabriela Guimarães (Rexona Ades)
- Best setter
  - (Peru) Zoila La Rosa (Universidad San Martín)
- Best Middle Blockers
  - (Brazil) Ana Carolina da Silva (Rexona Ades)
  - (Argentina) Candelaria Herrera (Villa Dora)
- Best libero
  - (Brazil) Fabiana de Oliveira (Rexona Ades)
