= Andrea Urrutia =

Peruvian volleyball player (born 1997)

Personal information
- Full name: Andrea Urrutia Puente Arnao
- Nationality: Peruvian
- Born: 31 May 1997 (age 29)
- Height: 183 cm (6 ft 0 in)
- Weight: 65 kg (143 lb)
- Spike: 310 cm (122 in)
- Block: 299 cm (118 in)

Volleyball information
- Position: Middle Blocker

Career
Years	Teams
2014	Universidad de San Martín de Porres

National team
2014	Peru
Honours
Women's volleyball
Representing Peru
Bolivarian Games
Silver medal – second place	2017 Santa Marta	Team

Andrea Urrutia Puente Arnao (born 31 May 1997) is a Peruvian female volleyball player. She is part of the Peru women's national volleyball team.

== Career ==
She participated in the 2014 FIVB Volleyball World Grand Prix. On club level she played for Club Univ. San Martin De Porres in 2014. She won the Best Blocker award in the 2014 U23 Pan-American Cup. She won the silver medal in the 2017 Bolivarian Games under 23 tournament.

== Clubs ==
- (Peru) Universidad San Martín (2013–2020)

== Awards ==
=== Individuals ===
- 2014 U23 Pan-American Cup "Best Blocker"
