= 2012 Women's Junior South American Volleyball Championship =

Athletic competition

Tournament details
- Host country: Peru
- Dates: 18 – 22 October
- Teams: 8
- Venue: 1 (in Lima host cities)

Final positions
- Champions: Brazil (17th title)

Tournament awards
- MVP: Diana Arrechea (COL)

The 2012 Women's Junior South American Volleyball Championship was the 21st edition of the tournament, organised by South America's governing volleyball body, the Confederación Sudamericana de Voleibol (CSV). It was determined February 26, 2011 the Peru would be the host. The top three teams qualified for the 2013 Junior World Championship.

== Competing nations ==
The following national teams participated in the tournament, teams were seeded according to how they finished in the previous edition of the tournament:

Pool A	Pool B
Brazil (1st); Colombia (4th); Argentina (5th); Paraguay	Peru (Host & 2nd); Venezuela (3rd); Chile (6th); Uruguay (7th)

== First round ==
- Venue: Coliseo Eduardo Dibos, Lima, Peru
- All times are Peruvian Standard Time (UTC−05:00)

=== Pool A ===
Pos	Team	Pld	W	L	Pts	SW	SL	SR	SPW	SPL	SPR	Qualification
1	Brazil	3	3	0	9	9	1	9.000	249	160	1.556	Semifinals
2	Colombia	3	2	1	6	7	4	1.750	254	211	1.204	Semifinals
3	Argentina	3	1	2	3	4	6	0.667	210	192	1.094	
4	Paraguay	3	0	3	0	0	9	0.000	75	225	0.333	

Date	Time		Score		Set 1	Set 2	Set 3	Set 4	Set 5	Total
18 Oct	15:00	Colombia	3–1	Argentina	25–20	25–18	19–25	26–24		95–87
18 Oct	19:00	Paraguay	0–3	Brazil	9–25	9–25	10–25			28–75
19 Oct	13:00	Colombia	3–0	Paraguay	25–13	25–5	25–7			75–25
19 Oct	15:00	Brazil	3–0	Argentina	25–13	25–19	25–16			75–48
20 Oct	15:00	Brazil	3–1	Colombia	25–23	24–26	25–14	25–21		99–84
20 Oct	19:00	Argentina	3–0	Paraguay	25–8	25–6	25–8			75–22

=== Pool B ===
Pos	Team	Pld	W	L	Pts	SPW	SPL	SPR	SW	SL	SR	Qualification
1	Peru	3	3	0	9	249	141	1.766	9	1	9.000	Semifinals
2	Chile	3	2	1	5	287	276	1.040	7	6	1.167	Semifinals
3	Venezuela	3	1	2	4	238	287	0.829	5	7	0.714	
4	Uruguay	3	0	3	0	202	272	0.743	2	9	0.222	

Date	Time		Score		Set 1	Set 2	Set 3	Set 4	Set 5	Total
18 Oct	13:00	Venezuela	2–3	Chile	26–28	25–23	25–23	18–25	7–15	101–114
18 Oct	17:00	Peru	3–0	Uruguay	25–9	25–8	25–11			75–28
19 Oct	17:00	Peru	3–1	Chile	25–18	24–26	25–21	25–12		99–77
19 Oct	19:00	Venezuela	3–1	Uruguay	20–25	25–21	31–29	25–23		101–98
20 Oct	13:00	Chile	3–1	Uruguay	20–25	25–12	26–24	25–15		96–76
20 Oct	17:00	Peru	3–0	Venezuela	25–15	25–12	25–9			75–36

== Final round ==
=== 5th to 8th places bracket ===
5th to 8th Classification
2012-10-21 – Lima
Venezuela	3
Paraguay	0
2012-10-21 – Lima
Argentina	3
Uruguay	0

5th place match
2012-10-22 – Lima
Venezuela	0
Argentina	3
7th place match
2012-10-22 – Lima
Paraguay	2
Uruguay	3

=== Championship bracket ===
Semifinals
2012-10-21 – Lima
Peru	3
Colombia	1
2012-10-21 – Lima
Brazil	3
Chile	0

Final
2012-10-22 – Lima
Peru	1
Brazil	3
Third place
2012-10-22 – Lima
Colombia	3
Chile	1

=== Classification 5 to 8 ===
Date	Time		Score		Set 1	Set 2	Set 3	Set 4	Set 5	Total
21 Oct	13:00	Venezuela	3–0	Paraguay	25–20	25–19	25–22			75–61
21 Oct	19:00	Argentina	3–0	Uruguay	25–10	25–12	25–11			75–33

=== Semifinals ===
Date	Time		Score		Set 1	Set 2	Set 3	Set 4	Set 5	Total
21 Oct	15:00	Brazil	3–0	Chile	25–7	25–14	25–17			75–38
21 Oct	17:00	Peru	3–1	Colombia	23–25	25–20	25–21	25–22		98–88

=== 7th place match ===
Date	Time		Score		Set 1	Set 2	Set 3	Set 4	Set 5	Total
22 Oct	13:00	Paraguay	2–3	Uruguay	25–14	25–18	17–25	21–25	11–15	99–97

=== 5th place match ===
Date	Time		Score		Set 1	Set 2	Set 3	Set 4	Set 5	Total
22 Oct	15:00	Argentina	3–0	Venezuela	25–23	28–26	25–14			78–63

=== Bronze Medal match ===
Date	Time		Score		Set 1	Set 2	Set 3	Set 4	Set 5	Total
22 Oct	19:00	Colombia	3–1	Chile	19–25	25–8	27–25	25–18		96–76

=== Gold Medal match ===
Date	Time		Score		Set 1	Set 2	Set 3	Set 4	Set 5	Total
22 Oct	13:00	Brazil	3–1	Peru	25–15	25–16	23–25	25–14		98–70

== Final standing ==
Rank	Team
1st place, gold medalist(s)	Brazil
2nd place, silver medalist(s)	Peru
3rd place, bronze medalist(s)	Colombia
4	Chile
5	Argentina
6	Venezuela
7	Uruguay
8	Paraguay

Qualified for the 2013 Junior World Championship

2012 Women's Junior South American Volleyball Championship

Brazil
17th title

== Individual awards ==
- Best scorer
  - Diana Arrechea (COL)
- Best spiker
  - Rosamaria Montibeller (BRA)
- Best blocker
  - Melissa Rangel (COL)
- Best server
  - Ángela Leyva (PER)
- Best digger
  - Génesis Duran (VEN)
- Best setter
  - Naiane Rios (BRA)
- Best receiver
  - Juliana Paes (BRA)
- Best libero
  - Nicole Vorpahl (CHI)
