= CV Universidad de San Martín de Porres =

Peruvian volleyball club

Club Deportivo Universidad de San Martín de Porres
- Full name: Universidad de San Martín de Porres
- Short name: USM
- Nickname: Las Santas (The Saints)
- Founded: 2011
- Ground: Manuel Bonilla Stadium (Capacity: 3000)
- Manager: (Brazil) Vinicius Gamino Alegrete
- Captain: Alexandra Machado
- League: Liga Nacional Superior de Voleibol
- 2022-23: 3rd place
- Website: Club home page

Uniforms
Home	Away

Universidad de San Martín de Porres is a women's volleyball club based in Lima, Peru champions of the Peruvian League in 2014 and 2015 and bronze medalists in the 2015 South American Championship. The club takes its name from the private university Universidad de San Martín de Porres.

== History ==
=== 2012 ===
After announcing the retirement of the Universidad de San Martín de Porres football club from the National football National Championship, the club intended to focus in other sports, strengthening the volleyball club among them.

At the end of the 2011–12 season, the team claimed second place in the championship, being defeated by Géminis in the final series. The club's foreign players Cándida Arias and Yonkaira Peña were selected best blocker and spiker, respectively, from the season.

Even when the club Géminis won the league championship and the right to represent Peru in the South American Club Championship, the team refused participating and Universidad San Martin was announced as taking its place in the competition. However, due to the lack of information about the tournament, the team turned back the invitation.

=== 2013 ===
The result of the 2012/2013 season was again the second place for Universidad San Martín after falling to Universidad César Vallejo in the final series. Yonkaira Peña received the season's Best Scorer award for San Martín de Porres.

=== 2014 ===
San Martín de Porres finally claimed their first championship when they defeated 3–1 to Sporting Cristal. Milca Da Silva became the Most Valuable Player and Best Scorer and Zoila La Rosa was awarded Best Setter among the league season's best players.

=== 2015 ===
Having won the league in the previous season, the club claimed a spot in the 2015 South American Club Championship held in February in Osasco, Brazil. USM finished in third place, after losing to the Brazilian Rexona Ades 0–3 in the semifinals, but defeating 3–0 to the Argentinian Atlético Villa Dora in the bronze medal match. USM had Angela Leyva being chosen one of the tournament's Best Outside Hitters.

Yet again, the club representing Universidad de San Martín de Porres won the 2014/2015 Peruvian League season beating 3-1 Deportivo Geminis in the final match.

== Current squad ==
Squad as of the Liga Nacional Superior de Voleibol

Number	Player	Position	Height (m)
1	(Peru) Pamela Cuya	Libero	1.58
2	(Peru) Fabiana Niquen	Middle blocker	1.83
3	(Brazil) Camila Miranda	Setter	1.75
4	(Peru) Maricarmen Guerrero	Middle blocker	1.83
5	(Peru) Abby Gonzales	Opposite	1.75
5	(Peru) Paola Villegas	Libero	1.67
6	(Brazil) Simone Scherer	Middle Blocker	1.87
7	(Peru) Mirella Montes	Setter	1.62
8	(Peru) María José Pérez	Outside Hitter	1.68
9	(Argentina) Eliana Pérez	Opposite	1.88
10	(Chile) Catalina Reyes	Setter	1.76
11	(Peru) Daniela Muñóz	Opposite	1.78
12	(Peru) Brissa Nieves	Outside hitter	1.68
13	(Peru) Mabel Olemar	Outside hitter	1.75
14	(Peru) Alexandra Machado	Middle Blocker	1.80
15	(Peru) Ana Paula Torres	Opposite	1.72
16	(Peru) Astrid Ruiz	Outside Hitter	1.75
20	(Peru) Paola García	Middle Blocker	1.86
21	(Peru) Mariana Chalco	Setter	1.72

== Honours ==
Keys

- Record
- ^{(s)} Shared record

Type	Competition	Titles	Runner-up	Third place	Winning years	Runner-up years	Third place years
National (League)	Liga Peruana de Vóley Femenino	5	5	2	2013–14, 2014–15, 2015–16, 2017–18, 2018–19	2011–12, 2012–13, 2016–17, 2023–24, 2025–26	2022–23, 2024–25
International (Cups)	Campeonato Sudamericano de Clubes de Voleibol Femenino	—	1	2	—	2016	2015, 2017

=== Summary ===
Senior competition	1st place, gold medalist(s)	2nd place, silver medalist(s)	3rd place, bronze medalist(s)	Total
Liga Peruana de Vóley Femenino	5	5	2	12
Campeonato Sudamericano de Clubes de Voleibol Femenino	0	1	2	3
Total	5	6	4	15

== Performance in International competitions ==
- Campeonato Sudamericano de Clubes de Voleibol Femenino: 5 appearances

2015: (bronze) Third place
2016: (silver) Runner-up
2017: (bronze) Third place
2026: Fourth place
2027:
