= María de Fátima Acosta =

Peruvian volleyball player (born 1992)

Maria De Fatima Acosta

Personal information
- Nationality: Peruvian
- Born: 25 May 1992 (age 34)
- Height: 164 cm (5 ft 5 in)
- Weight: 56 kg (123 lb)
- Spike: 275 cm (108 in)
- Block: 270 cm (106 in)

Volleyball information
- Position: libero

Career
Years	Teams
2014	Club Deportivo Geminis

National team
2014	Peru

Maria De Fatima Acosta (born 25 May 1992) is a Peruvian female volleyball player, playing as a libero. She is part of the Peru women's national volleyball team. On club level she played for Club Deportivo Geminis in 2014.
