= Volleyball at the 2017 Bolivarian Games – Women's tournament =

The Women's tournament of volleyball at the 2017 Bolivarian Games in Santa Marta, Colombia, was held between November 12 and November 16. All games were played at the Coliseo Municipal. The Dominican Republic won the tournament, Peru and Colombia followed.

== Teams ==
- Bolivia
- Colombia
- Dominican Republic
- Peru
- Venezuela

== Pool standing procedure ==
1. Match points
2. Sets ratio
3. Points ratio
4. Result of the last match between the tied teams

Match won 3–0 or 3–1: 3 match points for the winner, 0 match points for the loser
Match won 3–2: 2 match points for the winner, 1 match point for the loser

== Round-Robin ==
Pos	Team	Pld	W	L	Pts	SW	SL	SR	SPW	SPL	SPR
1	Dominican Republic	4	4	0	12	12	2	6.000	340	251	1.355
2	Peru	4	3	1	9	10	3	3.333	301	250	1.204
3	Colombia	4	2	2	6	7	6	1.167	290	246	1.179
4	Venezuela	4	1	3	3	3	9	0.333	232	280	0.829
5	Bolivia	4	0	4	0	0	12	0.000	164	300	0.547

=== Match results ===
Date	Time		Score		Set 1	Set 2	Set 3	Set 4	Set 5	Total	Report
12 Nov	16:00	Venezuela	0–3	Dominican Republic	12–25	23–25	17–25			52–75	Res
12 Nov	18:30	Bolivia	0–3	Colombia	7–25	9–25	18–25			34–75	Res
13 Nov	16:00	Peru	3–0	Bolivia	25–12	25–11	25–11			75–34	Res
13 Nov	18:30	Colombia	3–0	Venezuela	25–15	25–22	25–10			75–47	Res
14 Nov	16:00	Dominican Republic	3–1	Peru	25–14	25–27	25–17	25–16		100–74	Res
14 Nov	18:30	Bolivia	0–3	Venezuela	13–25	19–25	21–25			53–75	Res
15 Nov	16:00	Dominican Republic	3–0	Bolivia	25–17	25–14	25–12			75–43	Res
15 Nov	18:30	Peru	3–0	Colombia	25–21	25–16	25–21			75–58	Res
16 Nov	16:00	Venezuela	0–3	Peru	25–27	15–25	18–25			58–77	Res
16 Nov	18:30	Colombia	1–3	Dominican Republic	25–13	21–25	11–25	25–27		82–90	Res

== Final standings ==
Rank	Team
1st place, gold medalist(s)	Dominican Republic
2nd place, silver medalist(s)	Peru
3rd place, bronze medalist(s)	Colombia
4.	Venezuela
5.	Bolivia

2017 Women's Bolivarian champions

Dominican Republic
1st title
