= 2018–19 Liga Nacional Superior de Voleibol Femenino =

Liga Nacional Superior de Voleibol Femenino
- Association: FPV
- League: Liga Peruana de Vóley Femenino
- Sport: Volleyball
- Duration: November 23, 2018 to March 24, 2019
- Games: 108
- Teams: 10
- Relegated: Túpac Amaru
- Finals champions: Universidad San Martín (5th title)
- Runners-up: Circolo Sportivo Italiano

Seasons
- ← 2017–18 2019–20 →

The 2018–19 Liga Nacional Superior de Voleibol Femenino (Spanish for: 2018–19 Women's Senior National Volleyball League) or 2018–19 LNSV was the 17th official season of the Peruvian Volleyball League. Universidad San Martín were crowned champions after defeating Circolo Sportivo Italiano 3–2 in the extra game.

According to the complaint filed by Universidad San Martín and Túpac Amaru, player Patricia Aranda, from Sporting Cristal, did not have a valid International Transfer Certificate (ITC) to compete in the country. Although the player had already acquired Peruvian nationality, she had not regularized her status with the Fédération Internationale de Volleyball, where she was still registered as Spanish. This change of nationality should have been processed before the start of the season; however, according to inquiries made by both clubs to the FIVB, the procedure had not been completed at that time.

As a result, the Appeals Subcommittee of the Liga Nacional Superior de Voleibol (LNSV) ruled that Sporting Cristal would forfeit the following matches, each by a score of 3–0:

- Géminis vs. Sporting Cristal
- Regatas Lima vs. Sporting Cristal
- Túpac Amaru vs. Sporting Cristal
- Circolo Sportivo Italiano vs. Sporting Cristal

== Teams ==
=== Competing Teams ===
Club	Manager
Alianza Lima	(Peru) Carlos Aparicio
Circolo Sportivo Italiano	(Peru) Walter Lung
Géminis	(Peru) Martín Escudero
Jaamsa	(Cuba) Juan Carlos Gala
Regatas Lima	(Brazil) Marco Queiroga
Sporting Cristal	(South Korea) Byung-Tae Seo
Túpac Amaru	(Peru) José Castillo
Universidad César Vallejo	(Peru) Carlos Rivero
Universidad San Martín	(Peru) Martín Rodríguez
Universidad SISE	(Peru) Edwin Jiménez

== First stage ==
The first round is a Round-Robin system where all 10 teams will play once against the other 9.

Pool standing procedure

1. Match points
2. Numbers of matches won
3. Sets ratio
4. Points ratio

Match won 3–0 or 3–1: 3 match points for the winner, 0 match points for the loser
Match won 3–2: 2 match points for the winner, 1 match point for the loser

Ranking

Pos	Team	Pld	W	L	Pts	SPW	SPL	SPR	SW	SL	SR	Qualification
1	Regatas Lima	18	13	5	39	1564	1276	1.226	46	21	2.190	Second stage
2	Alianza Lima	18	12	6	37	1594	1467	1.087	42	27	1.556	Second stage
3	Universidad San Martín	18	10	8	34	1549	1416	1.094	41	27	1.519	Second stage
4	Sporting Cristal	18	11	7	32	1155	1355	0.852	34	28	1.214	Second stage
5	Universidad César Vallejo	18	10	8	32	1468	1480	0.992	36	33	1.091	Second stage
6	Géminis	18	12	6	31	1481	1417	1.045	38	30	1.267	Second stage
7	Jaamsa	18	9	9	24	1488	1469	1.013	34	34	1.000	Second stage
8	Circolo Sportivo Italiano	18	7	11	20	1453	1433	1.014	29	39	0.744	Second stage
9	Túpac Amaru	18	4	14	13	1380	1471	0.938	20	46	0.435	Cuadrangular por la permanencia
10	Universidad SISE	18	2	16	8	1198	1546	0.775	15	50	0.300	Cuadrangular por la permanencia

=== Results ===
==== Round 1 ====
Date		Score		Set 1	Set 2	Set 3	Set 4	Set 5	Total	Report
23 Nov	Jaamsa	3–0	Universidad César Vallejo	25–17	25–16	25–22			75–55	
23 Nov	Alianza Lima	3–1	Universidad SISE	21–25	25–12	25–14	25–14		96–65	
24 Nov	Géminis	3–0	Sporting Cristal	25–0	25–0	25–0			75–0	
24 Nov	Universidad San Martín	3–0	Túpac Amaru	25–23	27–25	25–15			77–63	
24 Nov	Regatas Lima	3–0	Circolo Sportivo Italiano	25–11	25–19	25–23			75–53	

==== Round 2 ====
Date		Score		Set 1	Set 2	Set 3	Set 4	Set 5	Total	Report
24 Nov	Jaamsa	3–0	Universidad SISE	25–10	25–12	25–14			75–36	
25 Nov	Universidad San Martín	3–0	Universidad César Vallejo	25–18	25–22	25–17			75–57	
25 Nov	Túpac Amaru	1–3	Circolo Sportivo Italiano	25–20	17–25	21–25	23–25		86–95	
25 Nov	Regatas Lima	3–0	Sporting Cristal	25–0	25–0	25–0			75–0	
28 Nov	Alianza Lima	2–3	Géminis	19–25	25–16	26–24	22–25	8–15	100–105	

==== Round 3 ====
Date		Score		Set 1	Set 2	Set 3	Set 4	Set 5	Total	Report
28 Nov	Universidad San Martín	3–0	Circolo Sportivo Italiano	25–17	25–14	25–18			75–49	
30 Nov	Universidad César Vallejo	3–0	Universidad SISE	25–10	25–11	27–25			77–46	
30 Nov	Túpac Amaru	3–0	Sporting Cristal	25–0	25–0	25–0			75–0	
1 Dec	Jaamsa	1–3	Géminis	17–25	25–20	22–25	23–25		87–95	
5 Dec	Regatas Lima	3–2	Alianza Lima	25–23	25–14	22–25	17–25	16–14	105–98	

==== Round 4 ====
Date		Score		Set 1	Set 2	Set 3	Set 4	Set 5	Total	Report
1 Dec	Universidad San Martín	3–0	Universidad SISE	25–12	25–12	25–12			75–36	
2 Dec	Universidad César Vallejo	0–3	Géminis	21–25	16–25	16–25			53–75	
2 Dec	Circolo Sportivo Italiano	3–0	Sporting Cristal	25–0	25–0	25–0			75–0	
7 Dec	Jaamsa	3–2	Regatas Lima	18–25	25–22	22–25	25–18	16–14	106–104	
7 Dec	Túpac Amaru	1–3	Alianza Lima	28–30	25–17	19–25	15–25		87–97	

==== Round 5 ====
Date		Score		Set 1	Set 2	Set 3	Set 4	Set 5	Total	Report
5 Dec	Universidad San Martín	3–0	Sporting Cristal	25–0	25–0	25–0			75–0	
12 Dec	Universidad SISE	2–3	Géminis	25–21	27–25	22–25	15–25	10–15	99–111	
12 Dec	Circolo Sportivo Italiano	1–3	Alianza Lima	18–25	15–25	25–23	18–25		76–93	
16 Dec	Universidad César Vallejo	3–1	Regatas Lima	25–23	25–22	8–25	25–18		83–88	
16 Dec	Túpac Amaru	0–3	Jaamsa	19–25	23–25	14–25			56–75	

==== Round 6 ====
Date		Score		Set 1	Set 2	Set 3	Set 4	Set 5	Total	Report
9 Jan	Universidad San Martín	2–3	Géminis	24–26	20–25	25–15	25–23	10–15	104–104	
9 Jan	Universidad SISE	0–3	Regatas Lima	11–25	17–25	21–25			39–75	
11 Jan	Sporting Cristal	0–3	Alianza Lima	22–25	19–25	23–25			64–75	
11 Jan	Circolo Sportivo Italiano	1–3	Jaamsa	16–25	25–19	19–25	21–25		81–94	
12 Jan	Universidad César Vallejo	3–0	Túpac Amaru	25–13	25–14	25–23			75–50	

==== Round 7 ====
Date		Score		Set 1	Set 2	Set 3	Set 4	Set 5	Total	Report
12 Jan	Alianza Lima	3–1	Universidad San Martín	26–24	26–24	20–25	25–14		97–87	
12 Jan	Sporting Cristal	3–1	Jaamsa	21–25	25–16	25–18	27–25		98–84	
12 Jan	Géminis	0–3	Regatas Lima	20–25	20–25	10–25			50–75	
13 Jan	Universidad SISE	1–3	Túpac Amaru	25–17	23–25	18–25	14–25		80–92	
13 Jan	Circolo Sportivo Italiano	1–3	Universidad César Vallejo	24–26	17–25	25–11	15–25		81–87	

==== Round 8 ====
Date		Score		Set 1	Set 2	Set 3	Set 4	Set 5	Total	Report
13 Jan	Universidad San Martín	0–3	Regatas Lima	15–25	16–25	19–25			50–75	
16 Jan	Alianza Lima	3–0	Jaamsa	25–18	25–20	25–16			75–54	
16 Jan	Géminis	3–0	Túpac Amaru	27–25	25–19	26–24			78–68	
18 Jan	Sporting Cristal	3–0	Universidad César Vallejo	25–19	25–17	25–21			75–57	
18 Jan	Universidad SISE	0–3	Circolo Sportivo Italiano	17–25	22–25	24–26			63–76	

==== Round 9 ====
Date		Score		Set 1	Set 2	Set 3	Set 4	Set 5	Total	Report
19 Jan	Alianza Lima	1–3	Universidad César Vallejo	16–25	25–10	21–25	23–25		85–85	
19 Jan	Universidad San Martín	3–1	Jaamsa	25–22	25–18	18–25	25–17		93–82	
19 Jan	Regatas Lima	3–0	Túpac Amaru	25–17	25–12	25–21			75–50	
20 Jan	Géminis	1–3	Circolo Sportivo Italiano	18–25	25–16	12–25	24–26		79–92	
20 Jan	Sporting Cristal	3–0	Universidad SISE	25–20	25–18	25–16			75–54	

==== Round 10 ====
Date		Score		Set 1	Set 2	Set 3	Set 4	Set 5	Total	Report
23 Jan	Jaamsa	3–2	Universidad César Vallejo	25–20	19–25	25–21	20–25	15–9	104–100	
23 Jan	Universidad San Martín	2–3	Túpac Amaru	25–23	21–25	25–27	25–23	11–15	107–113	
25 Jan	Regatas Lima	3–1	Circolo Sportivo Italiano	25–20	23–25	28–26	25–23		101–94	
25 Jan	Alianza Lima	3–1	Universidad SISE	25–17	25–18	31–33	25–18		106–86	
26 Jan	Sporting Cristal	3–1	Géminis	25–17	25–14	20–25	25–18		95–74	

==== Round 11 ====
Date		Score		Set 1	Set 2	Set 3	Set 4	Set 5	Total	Report
26 Jan	Universidad César Vallejo	3–1	Universidad San Martín	25–20	25–23	22–25	25–23		97–91	
26 Jan	Circolo Sportivo Italiano	3–2	Túpac Amaru	25–15	13–25	25–14	21–25	15–8	99–87	
27 Jan	Regatas Lima	3–0	Sporting Cristal	25–19	25–23	25–14			75–56	
27 Jan	Universidad SISE	3–1	Jaamsa	25–20	17–25	25–12	25–21		92–78	
27 Jan	Géminis	3–0	Alianza Lima	25–18	26–24	25–23	–		76–65	

==== Round 12 ====
Date		Score		Set 1	Set 2	Set 3	Set 4	Set 5	Total	Report
30 Jan	Universidad San Martín	2–3	Circolo Sportivo Italiano	25–22	25–20	19–25	20–25	16–18	105–110	
30 Jan	Universidad César Vallejo	3–2	Universidad SISE	25–16	25–16	23–25	15–25	15–9	103–91	
1 Feb	Túpac Amaru	0–3	Sporting Cristal	22–25	20–25	21–25			63–75	
1 Feb	Jaamsa	3–0	Géminis	25–22	25–18	25–23			75–63	
2 Feb	Regatas Lima	2–3	Alianza Lima	18–25	23–25	25–19	25–23	13–15	104–107	

==== Round 13 ====
Date		Score		Set 1	Set 2	Set 3	Set 4	Set 5	Total	Report
2 Feb	Universidad San Martín	3–0	Universidad SISE	25–10	25–18	25–13			75–41	
2 Feb	Sporting Cristal	3–0	Circolo Sportivo Italiano	25–19	25–23	25–14			75–56	
3 Feb	Alianza Lima	3–0	Túpac Amaru	25–22	25–15	26–24			76–61	
3 Feb	Universidad César Vallejo	2–3	Géminis	23–25	19–25	25–21	25–16	2–15	94–102	
3 Feb	Jaamsa	0–3	Regatas Lima	13–25	24–26	19–25			56–76	

==== Round 14 ====
Date		Score		Set 1	Set 2	Set 3	Set 4	Set 5	Total	Report
6 Feb	Universidad San Martín	1–3	Sporting Cristal	19–25	22–25	25–19	22–25		88–94	
6 Feb	Géminis	3–1	Universidad SISE	15–25	25–19	22–25	25–18	25–22	90–84	
8 Feb	Circolo Sportivo Italiano	1–3	Alianza Lima	21–25	25–20	14–25	23–25		83–95	
8 Feb	Universidad César Vallejo	3–1	Regatas Lima	18–25	25–22	25–22	25–22		93–91	
9 Feb	Túpac Amaru	0–3	Jaamsa	12–25	17–25	20–25			49–75	

==== Round 15 ====
Date		Score		Set 1	Set 2	Set 3	Set 4	Set 5	Total	Report
9 Feb	Universidad San Martín	3–0	Géminis	25–22	25–23	25–12			75–57	
9 Feb	Alianza Lima	1–3	Sporting Cristal	25–19	18–25	23–25	20–25		86–94	
10 Feb	Universidad SISE	1–3	Regatas Lima	24–26	25–21	11–25	16–25		76–97	
10 Feb	Circolo Sportivo Italiano	2–3	Jaamsa	19–25	25–19	22–25	25–20	13–15	104–104	
10 Feb	Universidad César Vallejo	3–1	Túpac Amaru	25–21	25–19	24–26	25–20		99–86	

==== Round 16 ====
Date		Score		Set 1	Set 2	Set 3	Set 4	Set 5	Total	Report
13 Feb	Universidad San Martín	3–0	Alianza Lima	25–22	25–11	31–29			81–62	
13 Feb	Sporting Cristal	3–1	Jaamsa	26–24	25–21	22–25	25–16		98–86	
15 Feb	Géminis	0–3	Regatas Lima	24–26	19–25	25–27			68–78	
15 Feb	Universidad SISE	3–1	Túpac Amaru	25–20	27–25	20–25	26–24		98–94	
16 Feb	Circolo Sportivo Italiano	1–3	Universidad César Vallejo	23–25	25–16	20–25	21–25		89–91	

==== Round 17 ====
Date		Score		Set 1	Set 2	Set 3	Set 4	Set 5	Total	Report
16 Feb	Universidad San Martín	2–3	Regatas Lima	25–22	17–25	24–26	26–24	11–15	103–112	
16 Feb	Alianza Lima	3–1	Jaamsa	25–19	20–25	28–26	25–20		98–90	
17 Feb	Géminis	3–2	Túpac Amaru	25–20	20–25	17–25	25–23	17–15	104–108	
17 Feb	Sporting Cristal	3–2	Universidad César Vallejo	14–25	25–17	25–21	22–25	15–7	101–95	
17 Feb	Universidad SISE	0–3	Circolo Sportivo Italiano	14–25	17–25	13–25			44–75	

==== Round 18 ====
Date		Score		Set 1	Set 2	Set 3	Set 4	Set 5	Total	Report
17 Feb	Universidad San Martín	3–1	Jaamsa	25–19	19–25	25–23	25–21		94–88	
20 Feb	Regatas Lima	1–3	Túpac Amaru	25–16	20–25	19–25	22–25		86–91	
20 Feb	Alianza Lima	3–0	Universidad César Vallejo	25–23	25–23	25–21			75–67	
22 Feb	Géminis	3–0	Circolo Sportivo Italiano	25–23	25–19	25–23			75–65	
22 Feb	Sporting Cristal	3–0	Universidad SISE	25–22	25–22	26–24			76–68	

== Cuadrangular por la permanencia ==
Ranking

Pos	Team	Pld	W	L	Pts	SPW	SPL	SPR	SW	SL	SR	Qualification
1	Universidad SISE	3	3	0	8	0	0	—	0	0	—	
2	Rebaza Acosta	3	2	1	5	0	0	—	0	0	—	
3	Túpac Amaru	3	1	2	5	0	0	—	0	0	—	Relegation to 2019–20 LNIV
4	Latino Amisa	3	0	3	0	0	0	—	0	0	—	Relegation to 2019–20 LNIV

=== Results ===
==== Round 1 ====
Date		Score		Set 1	Set 2	Set 3	Set 4	Set 5	Total	Report
9 Mar	Universidad SISE	3–0	Rebaza Acosta	25–21	27–25	25–19			77–65	
9 Mar	Túpac Amaru	–	Latino Amisa	–	–	–	–	–	–	

==== Round 2 ====
Date		Score		Set 1	Set 2	Set 3	Set 4	Set 5	Total	Report
13 Mar	Universidad SISE	–	Latino Amisa	–	–	–	–		–	
13 Mar	Túpac Amaru	–	Rebaza Acosta	–	–	–	–	–	–	

==== Round 3 ====
Date		Score		Set 1	Set 2	Set 3	Set 4	Set 5	Total	Report
16 Mar	Rebaza Acosta	3–1	Latino Amisa	–	–	–	–		–	
16 Mar	Universidad SISE	3–2	Túpac Amaru	–	–	–	–	–	–	

== Second stage ==
=== Quarterfinals ===
==== First leg ====
Date		Score		Set 1	Set 2	Set 3	Set 4	Set 5	Total	Report
23 Feb	Regatas Lima	3–0	Circolo Sportivo Italiano	25–21	25–22	25–22			75–65	
23 Feb	Sporting Cristal	2–3	Universidad César Vallejo	18–25	25–17	16–25	25–18	12–15	96–100	
24 Feb	Jaamsa	3–1	Alianza Lima	23–25	25–23	25–13	25–21		98–79	
24 Feb	Universidad San Martín	3–1	Géminis	25–18	15–25	25–22	25–14		90–79	

==== Second leg ====
Date		Score		Set 1	Set 2	Set 3	Set 4	Set 5	Total	Report
27 Feb	Circolo Sportivo Italiano	3–2	Regatas Lima	25–23	25–21	24–26	24–26	15–5	113–96	
27 Feb	Universidad César Vallejo	3–0	Sporting Cristal	25–23	25–17	25–20			75–60	
1 Mar	Alianza Lima	2–3	Jaamsa	25–22	19–25	17–25	25–20	13–15	99–107	
1 Mar	Géminis	1–3	Universidad San Martín	13–25	20–25	25–23	24–26		72–99	

==== Extra game ====
Date		Score		Set 1	Set 2	Set 3	Set 4	Set 5	Total	Report
2 Mar	Regatas Lima	2–3	Circolo Sportivo Italiano	25–18	25–12	14–25	18–25	10–15	92–95	

== Third stage ==
=== Semifinals ===
==== First leg ====
Date		Score		Set 1	Set 2	Set 3	Set 4	Set 5	Total	Report
8 Mar	Circolo Sportivo Italiano	3–1	Universidad César Vallejo	25–20	22–25	25–17	25–18		97–80	
8 Mar	Jaamsa	1–3	Universidad San Martín	20–25	31–33	25–19	18–25		94–102	

==== Second leg ====
Date		Score		Set 1	Set 2	Set 3	Set 4	Set 5	Total	Report
10 Mar	Universidad César Vallejo	1–3	Circolo Sportivo Italiano	17–25	25–22	17–25	18–25		77–97	
10 Mar	Universidad San Martín	3–2	Jaamsa	16–25	25–19	13–25	25–20	15–13	94–102	

== Fourth stage ==
=== Bronze Medal Matches ===
==== First leg ====
Date		Score		Set 1	Set 2	Set 3	Set 4	Set 5	Total	Report
15 Mar	Universidad César Vallejo	2–3	Jaamsa	25–16	17–25	21–25	25–15	11–15	99–96	

==== Second leg ====
Date		Score		Set 1	Set 2	Set 3	Set 4	Set 5	Total	Report
17 Mar	Jaamsa	3–1	Universidad César Vallejo	23–25	25–19	25–21	25–16		98–81	

=== Gold Medal Matches ===
==== First leg ====
Date		Score		Set 1	Set 2	Set 3	Set 4	Set 5	Total	Report
15 Mar	Universidad San Martín	3–2	Circolo Sportivo Italiano	22–25	25–22	17–25	25–20	15–10	104–102	

==== Second leg ====
Date		Score		Set 1	Set 2	Set 3	Set 4	Set 5	Total	Report
17 Mar	Circolo Sportivo Italiano	3–2	Universidad San Martín	10–25	25–27	25–22	27–25	15–11	102–110	

==== Extra game ====
Date		Score		Set 1	Set 2	Set 3	Set 4	Set 5	Total	Report
24 Mar	Universidad San Martín	3–2	Circolo Sportivo Italiano	25–10	22–25	16–25	25–16	15–12	103–88	

== Final standing ==
Rank	Team
1st place, gold medalist(s)	Universidad San Martín
2nd place, silver medalist(s)	Circolo Sportivo Italiano
3rd place, bronze medalist(s)	Jaamsa
4	Universidad César Vallejo
5	Regatas Lima
6	Alianza Lima
7	Sporting Cristal
8	Géminis
9	Universidad SISE
10	Túpac Amaru

Team qualified for the 2020 South American Club Championship
Team lost A1 category

2018–19 Liga Nacional Superior de Voleibol;

Universidad San Martín
5th title
