= 2020–21 Liga Nacional Superior de Voleibol Femenino =

Liga Nacional Superior de Voleibol Femenino
- Association: FPV
- League: Liga Peruana de Vóley Femenino
- Sport: Volleyball
- Duration: March 10, 2021 to June 1, 2021
- Games: 74
- Teams: 10
- Finals champions: Regatas Lima (8th title)
- Runners-up: Alianza Lima

Seasons
- ← 2019–20 2021–22 →

The 2020–21 Liga Nacional Superior de Voleibol Femenino (Spanish for: 2020–21 Women's Senior National Volleyball League) or 2020–21 LNSV was the 19th official season of the Peruvian Volleyball League. Regatas Lima were crowned champions after defeating Alianza Lima 3–2 in the third match of the final.

Sport Real and Universidad César Vallejo withdrew from the Liga Nacional Superior de Voleibol Femenino. They were replaced by Molivoleibol and Latino Amisa, the champion and runner-up, respectively, of the 2020 Liga Nacional Intermedia de Voleibol.

== Teams ==
=== Competing Teams ===
Club	Manager
Alianza Lima	(Peru) Carlos Aparicio
Circolo Sportivo Italiano	(Peru) Walter Lung
Deportivo Alianza	(Venezuela) Deyvis Yustiz
Géminis	(Peru) Sara Joya
Jaamsa	(Cuba) Juan Carlos Gala
Latino Amisa	(Peru) Natalia Málaga
Molivoleibol	(Peru) Carlos Maldonado
Rebaza Acosta	(Peru) Martín Rodríguez
Regatas Lima	(Argentina) Horacio Bastit
Universidad San Martín	(South Korea) Byung-Tae Seo

== First stage ==
The first round is a Round-Robin system where all 10 teams will play once against the other 9.

Pool standing procedure

1. Match points
2. Numbers of matches won
3. Sets ratio
4. Points ratio

Match won 3–0 or 3–1: 3 match points for the winner, 0 match points for the loser
Match won 3–2: 2 match points for the winner, 1 match point for the loser

Ranking

Pos	Team	Pld	W	L	Pts	SPW	SPL	SPR	SW	SL	SR	Qualification
1	Circolo Sportivo Italiano	9	9	0	25	775	611	1.268	27	6	4.500	Second stage
2	Alianza Lima	9	8	1	24	757	581	1.303	26	6	4.333	Second stage
3	Regatas Lima	9	7	2	22	750	637	1.177	23	9	2.556	Second stage
4	Jaamsa	9	6	3	19	737	617	1.194	22	10	2.200	Second stage
5	Latino Amisa	9	5	4	12	719	769	0.935	16	19	0.842	Second stage
6	Rebaza Acosta	9	4	5	12	734	739	0.993	16	17	0.941	Second stage
7	Géminis	9	2	7	7	668	747	0.894	10	22	0.455	Cuadrangular por la permanencia
8	Universidad San Martín	9	2	7	7	588	687	0.856	8	22	0.364	Cuadrangular por la permanencia
9	Molivoleibol	9	2	7	6	574	691	0.831	7	22	0.318	Cuadrangular por la permanencia
10	Deportivo Alianza	9	0	9	1	549	772	0.711	5	27	0.185	Cuadrangular por la permanencia

=== Results ===
==== Round 1 ====
Date		Score		Set 1	Set 2	Set 3	Set 4	Set 5	Total	Report
10 Mar	Circolo Sportivo Italiano	3–0	Deportivo Alianza	25–7	25–11	25–13			75–31	
10 Mar	Regatas Lima	3–0	Molivoleibol	25–15	26–24	25–23			76–62	
12 Mar	Jaamsa	3–0	Rebaza Acosta	25–17	25–22	25–17			75–56	
12 Mar	Alianza Lima	3–0	Géminis	25–14	25–19	25–19			75–52	
19 Mar	Universidad San Martín	2–3	Latino Amisa	25–22	23–25	25–20	21–25	8–15	102–104	

==== Round 2 ====
Date		Score		Set 1	Set 2	Set 3	Set 4	Set 5	Total	Report
13 Mar	Regatas Lima	3–1	Latino Amisa	25–15	23–25	25–16	25–23		98–79	
13 Mar	Jaamsa	3–0	Molivoleibol	25–16	25–16	25–16			75–48	
15 Mar	Alianza Lima	3–0	Deportivo Alianza	25–13	25–8	25–17			75–38	
15 Mar	Géminis	1–3	Rebaza Acosta	20–25	23–25	25–18	20–25		88–93	
24 Mar	Circolo Sportivo Italiano	3–0	Universidad San Martín	25–21	25–19	25–13			75–53	

==== Round 3 ====
Date		Score		Set 1	Set 2	Set 3	Set 4	Set 5	Total	Report
17 Mar	Alianza Lima	3–0	Universidad San Martín	25–13	25–22	25–17			75–52	
17 Mar	Circolo Sportivo Italiano	3–0	Latino Amisa	25–9	25–16	25–21			75–46	
17 Mar	Jaamsa	1–3	Regatas Lima	25–22	20–25	25–27	12–25		82–99	
19 Mar	Rebaza Acosta	3–0	Deportivo Alianza	25–20	25–20	25–16			75–56	
19 Mar	Géminis	0–3	Molivoleibol	16–25	26–28	20–25			62–78	

==== Round 4 ====
Date		Score		Set 1	Set 2	Set 3	Set 4	Set 5	Total	Report
20 Mar	Jaamsa	3–0	Latino Amisa	25–15	25–8	25–13			75–36	
20 Mar	Alianza Lima	2–3	Circolo Sportivo Italiano	21–25	18–25	25–16	25–19	12–15	101–100	
20 Mar	Géminis	0–3	Regatas Lima	22–25	19–25	20–25			61–75	
22 Mar	Deportivo Alianza	1–3	Molivoleibol	19–25	18–25	25–19	16–25		78–94	
22 Mar	Rebaza Acosta	3–0	Universidad San Martín	25–14	25–19	25–20			75–53	

==== Round 5 ====
Date		Score		Set 1	Set 2	Set 3	Set 4	Set 5	Total	Report
24 Mar	Alianza Lima	3–0	Latino Amisa	25–18	25–22	25–17			75–57	
24 Mar	Géminis	1–3	Jaamsa	17–25	16–25	25–20	16–25		74–95	
26 Mar	Deportivo Alianza	0–3	Regatas Lima	10–25	22–25	15–25			47–75	
26 Mar	Molivoleibol	0–3	Universidad San Martín	19–25	21–25	15–25			55–75	
26 Mar	Rebaza Acosta	1–3	Circolo Sportivo Italiano	20–25	25–20	23–25	13–25		81–95	

==== Round 6 ====
Date		Score		Set 1	Set 2	Set 3	Set 4	Set 5	Total	Report
27 Mar	Géminis	2–3	Latino Amisa	27–25	25–20	18–25	18–25	11–15	99–110	
27 Mar	Deportivo Alianza	0–3	Jaamsa	11–25	10–25	23–25			44–75	
27 Mar	Rebaza Acosta	1–3	Alianza Lima	15–25	25–21	22–25	26–28		88–99	
29 Mar	Molivoleibol	0–3	Circolo Sportivo Italiano	16–25	19–25	18–25			53–75	
29 Mar	Universidad San Martín	0–3	Regatas Lima	16–25	14–25	20–25			50–75	

==== Round 7 ====
Date		Score		Set 1	Set 2	Set 3	Set 4	Set 5	Total	Report
29 Mar	Deportivo Alianza	1–3	Géminis	19–25	25–21	27–29	17–25		88–100	
31 Mar	Rebaza Acosta	1–3	Latino Amisa	22–25	21–25	26–24	20–25		89–99	
31 Mar	Molivoleibol	0–3	Alianza Lima	13–25	16–25	21–25			50–75	
7 Apr	Universidad San Martín	0–3	Jaamsa	22–25	16–25	13–25			51–75	
17 Apr	Regatas Lima	2–3	Circolo Sportivo Italiano	25–19	14–25	20–25	25–18	10–15	94–102	

==== Round 8 ====
Date		Score		Set 1	Set 2	Set 3	Set 4	Set 5	Total	Report
7 Apr	Deportivo Alianza	2–3	Latino Amisa	14–25	25–22	18–25	25–21	10–15	92–108	
9 Apr	Universidad San Martín	0–3	Géminis	20–25	17–25	20–25			57–75	
16 Apr	Regatas Lima	0–3	Alianza Lima	22–25	11–25	21–25			54–75	
16 Apr	Circolo Sportivo Italiano	3–1	Jaamsa	26–28	25–20	25–23	26–24		102–95	
21 Apr	Molivoleibol	1–3	Rebaza Acosta	21–25	25–23	15–25	9–25		70–98	

==== Round 9 ====
Date		Score		Set 1	Set 2	Set 3	Set 4	Set 5	Total	Report
17 Apr	Molivoleibol	0–3	Latino Amisa	21–25	25–27	18–25			64–77	
20 Apr	Universidad San Martín	3–1	Deportivo Alianza	25–16	25–17	20–25	25–17		95–75	
20 Apr	Jaamsa	2–3	Alianza Lima	25–21	25–21	19–25	13–25	8–15	90–107	
21 Apr	Circolo Sportivo Italiano	3–0	Géminis	26–24	25–14	25–19			76–57	
22 Apr	Regatas Lima	3–1	Rebaza Acosta	27–29	27–25	25–14	25–11		104–79	

== Second stage ==
=== Serie A ===
Ranking

Pos	Team	Pld	W	L	Pts	SPW	SPL	SPR	SW	SL	SR	Qualification
1	Regatas Lima	4	4	0	11	347	283	1.226	12	3	4.000	Semifinals
2	Circolo Sportivo Italiano	4	2	2	7	331	305	1.085	9	6	1.500	Semifinals
3	Latino Amisa	4	0	4	0	214	304	0.704	0	12	0.000	

==== Results ====
Date		Score		Set 1	Set 2	Set 3	Set 4	Set 5	Total	Report
24 Apr	Regatas Lima	3–0	Latino Amisa	25–17	25–23	25–18			75–58	
28 Apr	Latino Amisa	0–3	Circolo Sportivo Italiano	27–29	19–25	20–25			66–79	
1 May	Circolo Sportivo Italiano	1–3	Regatas Lima	25–14	9–25	19–25	22–25		75–89	
4 May	Latino Amisa	0–3	Regatas Lima	15–25	15–25	18–25			48–75	
6 May	Circolo Sportivo Italiano	3–0	Latino Amisa	25–13	25–14	25–15			75–42	
8 May	Regatas Lima	3–2	Circolo Sportivo Italiano	25–19	25–19	20–25	22–25	16–14	108–102	

=== Serie B ===
Ranking

Pos	Team	Pld	W	L	Pts	SPW	SPL	SPR	SW	SL	SR	Qualification
1	Alianza Lima	4	3	1	8	354	324	1.093	10	5	2.000	Semifinals
2	Rebaza Acosta	4	2	2	5	319	330	0.967	6	9	0.667	Semifinals
3	Jaamsa	4	1	3	5	386	405	0.953	8	10	0.800	

==== Results ====
Date		Score		Set 1	Set 2	Set 3	Set 4	Set 5	Total	Report
24 Apr	Jaamsa	1–3	Rebaza Acosta	25–23	18–25	13–25	19–25		75–98	
28 Apr	Rebaza Acosta	0–3	Alianza Lima	25–27	15–25	24–26			64–78	
1 May	Alianza Lima	3–2	Jaamsa	26–28	26–28	25–22	26–24	15–13	118–115	
4 May	Rebaza Acosta	3–2	Jaamsa	25–22	20–25	25–21	21–25	15–9	106–102	
6 May	Alianza Lima	3–0	Rebaza Acosta	25–15	25–19	25–17			75–51	
8 May	Jaamsa	3–1	Alianza Lima	19–25	25–20	25–18	25–20		94–83	

== Cuadrangular por la permanencia ==
Ranking

Pos	Team	Pld	W	L	Pts	SPW	SPL	SPR	SW	SL	SR	Qualification
1	Géminis	3	3	0	8	277	236	1.174	9	3	3.000	
2	Universidad San Martín	3	2	1	5	269	264	1.019	6	6	1.000	
3	Deportivo Alianza	3	1	2	4	313	320	0.978	7	8	0.875	Qualification for Revalidación 2022
4	Molivoleibol	3	0	3	1	263	302	0.871	4	9	0.444	Relegation to 2021–22 LNIV

=== Results ===
==== Round 1 ====
Date		Score		Set 1	Set 2	Set 3	Set 4	Set 5	Total	Report
23 Apr	Géminis	3–2	Deportivo Alianza	22–25	25–22	25–13	25–20		97–80	
23 Apr	Universidad San Martín	3–1	Molivoleibol	25–20	23–25	25–14	25–23		98–82	

==== Round 2 ====
Date		Score		Set 1	Set 2	Set 3	Set 4	Set 5	Total	Report
26 Apr	Géminis	3–1	Molivoleibol	25–15	25–20	23–25	25–18		98–78	
26 Apr	Deportivo Alianza	2–3	Universidad San Martín	22–25	22–25	27–25	25–23	11–15	107–113	

==== Round 3 ====
Date		Score		Set 1	Set 2	Set 3	Set 4	Set 5	Total	Report
30 Apr	Géminis	3–0	Universidad San Martín	25–19	25–18	25–21			75–58	
30 Apr	Molivoleibol	2–3	Deportivo Alianza	19–25	17–25	25–14	28–26	14–16	103–106	

== Revalidación 2022 ==
Date		Score		Set 1	Set 2	Set 3	Set 4	Set 5	Total	Report
30 Oct	Deportivo Alianza	3–2	Star Net	25–19	25–13	17–25	16–25	15–9	98–91	

== Third stage ==
=== 5th Place Match ===
Date		Score		Set 1	Set 2	Set 3	Set 4	Set 5	Total	Report
12 May	Latino Amisa	2–3	Jaamsa	19–25	18–25	28–26	25–23	8–15	98–114	

=== Semifinals ===
==== First leg ====
Date		Score		Set 1	Set 2	Set 3	Set 4	Set 5	Total	Report
19 May	Regatas Lima	3–1	Rebaza Acosta	22–25	25–22	25–13	25–20		97–80	
19 May	Alianza Lima	3–0	Circolo Sportivo Italiano	25–23	25–16	25–20			75–59	

==== Second leg ====
Date		Score		Set 1	Set 2	Set 3	Set 4	Set 5	Total	Report
21 May	Rebaza Acosta	0–3	Regatas Lima	12–25	16–25	16–25			44–75	
21 May	Circolo Sportivo Italiano	0–3	Alianza Lima	20–25	19–25	18–25			57–75	

== Fourth stage ==
=== Bronze Medal Matches ===
==== First leg ====
Date		Score		Set 1	Set 2	Set 3	Set 4	Set 5	Total	Report
26 May	Rebaza Acosta	0–3	Circolo Sportivo Italiano	9–25	26–28	16–25			51–78	

==== Second leg ====
Date		Score		Set 1	Set 2	Set 3	Set 4	Set 5	Total	Report
29 May	Circolo Sportivo Italiano	3–1	Rebaza Acosta	25–17	25–23	23–25	25–20		98–85	

=== Gold Medal Matches ===
==== First leg ====
Date		Score		Set 1	Set 2	Set 3	Set 4	Set 5	Total	Report
26 May	Regatas Lima	3–1	Alianza Lima	23–25	25–18	25–15	27–25		100–83	

==== Second leg ====
Date		Score		Set 1	Set 2	Set 3	Set 4	Set 5	Total	Report
29 May	Alianza Lima	0–3	Regatas Lima	12–25	22–25	19–25			53–75	

==== Third leg ====
Date		Score		Set 1	Set 2	Set 3	Set 4	Set 5	Total	Report
1 Jun	Regatas Lima	3–2	Alianza Lima	21–25	23–25	25–12	25–21	15–9	109–92	

== Final standing ==
Rank	Team
1st place, gold medalist(s)	Regatas Lima
2nd place, silver medalist(s)	Alianza Lima
3rd place, bronze medalist(s)	Circolo Sportivo Italiano
4	Rebaza Acosta
5	Jaamsa
6	Latino Amisa
7	Géminis
8	Universidad San Martín
9	Deportivo Alianza
10	Molivoleibol

Team qualified for the 2022 South American Club Championship
Team lost A1 category

2020–21 Liga Nacional Superior de Voleibol;

Regatas Lima
7th title
