= 2019–20 Liga Nacional Superior de Voleibol Femenino =

Liga Nacional Superior de Voleibol Femenino
- Association: FPV
- League: Liga Peruana de Vóley Femenino
- Sport: Volleyball
- Duration: November 16, 2019 to March 11, 2020
- Games: 37
- Teams: 10
- Finals champions: No finished

Seasons
- ← 2018–19 2020–21 →

The 2019–20 Liga Nacional Superior de Voleibol Femenino (Spanish for: 2019–20 Women's Senior National Volleyball League) or 2019–20 LNSV was the 18th official season of the Peruvian Volleyball League. On March 27, 2020, the Peruvian Volleyball Federation officially announced the conclusion of the 2019–2020 Liga Nacional Superior de Voleibol due to the COVID-19 pandemic, without declaring any team as league champion.

For this season, Sporting Cristal changed its name to Club Sport Real.

== League concluded due to the COVID-19 pandemic ==
Without declaring a champion, the Peruvian Volleyball Federation officially announced on Friday, March 27, 2020, the conclusion of the 2019–20 Liga Nacional Superior de Voleibol Femenino, in which Universidad San Martín was the undisputed leader of the tournament. After the competition was suspended in the second week of March and later deemed impossible to resume due to the state of emergency in Peru, the federation decided to bring the tournament to an end “taking into account the health and well-being of all parties involved”.

== Teams ==
=== Competing Teams ===
Club	Manager
Alianza Lima	(Peru) Carlos Aparicio
Circolo Sportivo Italiano	(Peru) Walter Lung
Deportivo Alianza	(Venezuela) Deyvis Yustiz
Géminis	(Peru) Sara Joya
Jaamsa	(Cuba) Juan Carlos Gala
Rebaza Acosta	(Peru) Heinz Garro
Regatas Lima	(Argentina) Horacio Bastit
Sport Real	(South Korea) Byung-Tae Seo
Universidad César Vallejo	(Peru) Martín Rodríguez
Universidad San Martín	(Brazil) Antonio Rizola

== First stage ==
The first round is a Round-Robin system where all 10 teams will play once against the other 9.

Pool standing procedure

1. Match points
2. Numbers of matches won
3. Sets ratio
4. Points ratio

Match won 3–0 or 3–1: 3 match points for the winner, 0 match points for the loser
Match won 3–2: 2 match points for the winner, 1 match point for the loser

Ranking

Pos	Team	Pld	W	L	Pts	SPW	SPL	SPR	SW	SL	SR	Qualification
1	Regatas Lima	15	13	2	40	1287	1010	1.274	43	12	3.583	Second stage
2	Universidad San Martín	15	13	2	38	1189	899	1.323	42	8	5.250	Second stage
3	Circolo Sportivo Italiano	14	9	5	27	1132	1068	1.060	32	19	1.684	Second stage
4	Alianza Lima	15	9	6	27	1210	1152	1.050	32	21	1.524	Second stage
5	Jaamsa	14	9	5	25	1147	1069	1.073	29	23	1.261	Second stage
6	Universidad César Vallejo	15	6	9	22	1228	1282	0.958	22	28	0.786	Second stage
7	Géminis	14	8	6	21	1136	1157	0.982	25	25	1.000	Second stage
8	Sport Real	14	3	11	9	995	1124	0.885	13	35	0.371	Second stage
9	Rebaza Acosta	14	2	12	6	944	1104	0.855	10	38	0.263	Cuadrangular por la permanencia
10	Deportivo Alianza	14	0	14	1	681	1084	0.628	2	42	0.048	Cuadrangular por la permanencia

=== Results ===
==== Round 1 ====
Date		Score		Set 1	Set 2	Set 3	Set 4	Set 5	Total	Report
16 Nov	Universidad San Martín	3–0	Rebaza Acosta	25–16	25–16	25–23			75–55	
16 Nov	Circolo Sportivo Italiano	3–0	Deportivo Alianza	25–19	25–11	25–7			75–37	
16 Nov	Jaamsa	3–1	Géminis	20–25	25–10	25–19	25–16		95–70	
17 Nov	Universidad César Vallejo	2–3	Sport Real	26–24	25–21	23–25	18–25	8–15	100–110	
17 Nov	Universidad San Martín	3–0	Deportivo Alianza	25–19	25–9	25–8			75–36	
17 Nov	Regatas Lima	3–0	Alianza Lima	25–14	25–17	25–11			75–42	

==== Round 2 ====
Date		Score		Set 1	Set 2	Set 3	Set 4	Set 5	Total	Report
23 Nov	Rebaza Acosta	0–3	Géminis	23–25	19–25	20–25			62–75	
23 Nov	Circolo Sportivo Italiano	3–0	Sport Real	27–25	25–18	25–21			77–64	
23 Nov	Jaamsa	0–3	Alianza Lima	21–25	27–29	19–25			67–79	
24 Nov	Universidad César Vallejo	0–3	Regatas Lima	19–25	17–25	14–25			50–75	
24 Nov	Deportivo Alianza	0–3	Sport Real	20–25	11–25	20–25			51–75	
24 Nov	Universidad San Martín	3–0	Géminis	25–21	25–18	25–22			75–61	

==== Round 3 ====
Date		Score		Set 1	Set 2	Set 3	Set 4	Set 5	Total	Report
30 Nov	Jaamsa	3–2	Universidad César Vallejo	14–25	20–25	25–23	25–12	17–15	101–100	
30 Nov	Circolo Sportivo Italiano	0–3	Regatas Lima	22–25	16–25	15–25			53–75	
30 Nov	Rebaza Acosta	0–3	Alianza Lima	18–25	19–25	23–25			60–75	
1 Dec	Universidad San Martín	3–0	Sport Real	25–13	25–19	25–23			75–55	
1 Dec	Deportivo Alianza	0–3	Regatas Lima	17–25	17–25	12–25			46–75	
1 Dec	Universidad San Martín	1–3	Alianza Lima	22–25	19–25	31–29	18–25		90–104	

==== Round 4 ====
Date		Score		Set 1	Set 2	Set 3	Set 4	Set 5	Total	Report
23 Jan	Rebaza Acosta	0–3	Universidad César Vallejo	21–25	19–25	22–25			62–75	
23 Jan	Géminis	3–2	Alianza Lima	24–26	25–21	21–25	25–23	15–8	110–103	
23 Jan	Circolo Sportivo Italiano	2–3	Jaamsa	26–24	25–20	17–25	23–25	8–15	99–109	
24 Jan	Sport Real	1–3	Regatas Lima	22–25	29–27	11–25	21–25		83–102	
24 Jan	Géminis	3–2	Universidad César Vallejo	21–25	25–18	25–22	22–25	17–15	110–105	
24 Jan	Deportivo Alianza	0–3	Jaamsa	18–25	16–25	19–25			53–75	

==== Round 5 ====
Date		Score		Set 1	Set 2	Set 3	Set 4	Set 5	Total	Report
1 Feb	Rebaza Acosta	0–3	Circolo Sportivo Italiano	23–25	20–25	19–25			62–75	
1 Feb	Alianza Lima	1–3	Universidad César Vallejo	19–25	23–25	26–24	23–25		91–99	
1 Feb	Sport Real	0–3	Jaamsa	26–28	13–25	20–25			59–78	
2 Feb	Deportivo Alianza	0–3	Rebaza Acosta	16–25	6–25	20–25			42–75	
2 Feb	Géminis	2–3	Circolo Sportivo Italiano	25–22	24–26	21–25	25–21	14–16	109–110	
2 Feb	Universidad San Martín	3–2	Regatas Lima	18–25	25–16	23–25	25–20	15–6	106–92	

==== Round 6 ====
Date		Score		Set 1	Set 2	Set 3	Set 4	Set 5	Total	Report
7 Feb	Universidad San Martín	3–1	Universidad César Vallejo	16–25	25–9	25–18	25–16		91–68	
7 Feb	Regatas Lima	3–0	Jaamsa	25–17	25–22	25–19			75–68	
8 Feb	Sport Real	2–3	Rebaza Acosta	21–25	25–20	20–25	25–23	11–15	102–108	
8 Feb	Géminis	3–0	Deportivo Alianza	25–10	25–19	25–19			75–48	
8 Feb	Alianza Lima	3–2	Circolo Sportivo Italiano	18–25	25–16	25–17	22–25	15–9	105–102	
9 Feb	Regatas Lima	3–1	Rebaza Acosta	25–13	25–17	20–25	25–5		95–60	
9 Feb	Alianza Lima	3–0	Deportivo Alianza	25–12	25–19	25–13			75–44	
9 Feb	Universidad San Martín	3–0	Jaamsa	25–16	25–17	25–14			75–47	

==== Round 7 ====
Date		Score		Set 1	Set 2	Set 3	Set 4	Set 5	Total	Report
14 Feb	Universidad César Vallejo	3–1	Circolo Sportivo Italiano	15–25	25–21	25–23	25–22		90–91	
14 Feb	Sport Real	0–3	Géminis	20–25	18–25	23–25			61–75	
15 Feb	Jaamsa	3–0	Rebaza Acosta	25–17	25–23	25–15			75–55	
15 Feb	Alianza Lima	3–0	Sport Real	25–15	29–27	25–23			79–65	
16 Feb	Universidad César Vallejo	3–0	Deportivo Alianza	25–6	25–23	25–23			75–52	
16 Feb	Regatas Lima	3–0	Géminis	25–19	25–15	25–17			75–51	
16 Feb	Universidad San Martín	3–0	Circolo Sportivo Italiano	25–17	25–23	25–21			75–61	

==== Round 8 ====
Date		Score		Set 1	Set 2	Set 3	Set 4	Set 5	Total	Report
21 Feb	Universidad San Martín	3–0	Rebaza Acosta	25–23	25–17	25–17			75–57	
21 Feb	Circolo Sportivo Italiano	3–0	Deportivo Alianza	25–21	25–15	25–18			75–54	
22 Feb	Jaamsa	2–3	Géminis	16–25	25–27	25–15	25–19	8–15	99–101	
22 Feb	Universidad César Vallejo	3–0	Sport Real	25–16	25–22	25–22			75–60	
22 Feb	Regatas Lima	3–1	Alianza Lima	21–25	25–14	25–21	25–22		96–82	
23 Feb	Rebaza Acosta	2–3	Géminis	25–22	25–15	22–25	17–25	3–15	92–102	
23 Feb	Universidad San Martín	3–0	Deportivo Alianza	25–9	25–16	25–7			75–32	
23 Feb	Circolo Sportivo Italiano	3–0	Sport Real	25–23	26–24	25–18			76–65	

==== Round 9 ====
Date		Score		Set 1	Set 2	Set 3	Set 4	Set 5	Total	Report
28 Feb	Universidad César Vallejo	2–3	Regatas Lima	25–18	22–25	25–17	23–25	7–15	102–100	
28 Feb	Jaamsa	3–1	Alianza Lima	25–22	19–25	25–23	25–21		94–91	
29 Feb	Deportivo Alianza	0–3	Sport Real	22–25	17–25	17–25			56–75	
29 Feb	Rebaza Acosta	0–3	Alianza Lima	24–26	16–25	18–25			58–76	
29 Feb	Universidad San Martín	3–0	Géminis	25–20	25–13	25–19			75–52	
1 Mar	Circolo Sportivo Italiano	3–2	Regatas Lima	25–22	15–25	25–23	18–25	15–10	98–105	
1 Mar	Jaamsa	3–0	Universidad César Vallejo	25–19	25–19	25–21			75–59	
1 Mar	Universidad San Martín	3–0	Sport Real	25–19	25–20	25–12			75–51	

==== Round 10 ====
Date		Score		Set 1	Set 2	Set 3	Set 4	Set 5	Total	Report
4 Mar	Deportivo Alianza	0–3	Regatas Lima	17–25	19–25	16–25			52–75	
4 Mar	Géminis	0–3	Alianza Lima	14–25	22–25	26–28			62–78	
6 Mar	Rebaza Acosta	1–3	Universidad César Vallejo	19–25	21–25	25–12	20–25		85–87	
6 Mar	Circolo Sportivo Italiano	3–0	Jaamsa	25–23	25–21	25–21			75–65	
7 Mar	Sport Real	1–3	Regatas Lima	16–25	25–22	7–25	22–25		70–97	
7 Mar	Universidad San Martín	3–0	Alianza Lima	25–17	25–19	25–18			75–54	
8 Mar	Géminis	3–1	Universidad César Vallejo	25–10	28–30	25–19	25–19		103–78	
8 Mar	Deportivo Alianza	2–3	Jaamsa	25–23	25–21	8–25	13–25	7–15	78–109	
8 Mar	Rebaza Acosta	0–3	Circolo Sportivo Italiano	21–25	16–25	16–25			53–75	

==== Round 11 ====
Date		Score		Set 1	Set 2	Set 3	Set 4	Set 5	Total	Report
11 Mar	Alianza Lima	3–0	Universidad César Vallejo	26–24	25–18	25–23			76–65	
11 Mar	Universidad San Martín	0–3	Regatas Lima	23–25	18–25	16–25			57–75	
13 Mar	Géminis	Canceled	Circolo Sportivo Italiano							
13 Mar	Sport Real	Canceled	Jaamsa							
14 Mar	Deportivo Alianza	Canceled	Rebaza Acosta							
14 Mar	Universidad San Martín	Canceled	Universidad César Vallejo							
14 Mar	Regatas Lima	Canceled	Jaamsa							
15 Mar	Alianza Lima	Canceled	Circolo Sportivo Italiano							
15 Mar	Sport Real	Canceled	Rebaza Acosta							
15 Mar	Géminis	Canceled	Deportivo Alianza							
