= 2010–11 Liga Nacional Superior de Voleibol Femenino =

Liga Nacional Superior de Voleibol Femenino
- Association: FPV
- League: Liga Peruana de Vóley Femenino
- Sport: Volleyball
- Duration: July 7, 2010 to March 20, 2011
- Teams: 14
- Relegated: UNAS; Universitario
- Finals champions: Divino Maestro
- Runners-up: Géminis

Seasons
- ← 2009–10 2011–12 →

The 2010–11 Liga Nacional Superior de Voleibol Femenino (Spanish for: 2010-11 Women's Senior National Volleyball League) or 2010-11 LNSVF was the 9th official season of the Peruvian Volleyball League. Divino Maestro won the league championship and qualified to the Women's South American Volleyball Club Championship.

The Universitario team was disqualified from the Peruvian National Volleyball League following incidents that occurred during the match against Deportivo Alianza on February 24. The assault of a supposed Universitario supporter against an opposing fan resulted in the definitive sanction against Heinz Garro’s team.

== Teams ==
=== Competing teams ===
Club	Manager
Alianza Lima	(Peru) Carlos Aparicio
Camino de Vida	(Peru) David Rodas
Circolo Sportivo Italiano	(Peru) Teddy Riera
Deportivo Alianza	(Peru) Héctor Agurto
Deportivo Wanka	(Peru) Edwin Jiménez
Divino Maestro	(Peru) Martín Escudero
Géminis	(Peru) Carlos Rivero
Latino Amisa	(Peru) César Arrese
Regatas Lima	(Peru) Antonio Carrasco
Sporting Cristal	(Peru) Walter Lung
Túpac Amaru	(Peru) José Castillo
Universidad César Vallejo	(Cuba) Rolando Díaz
UNAS	
Universitario	(Peru) Heinz Garro

== Competition format ==
The tournament was played under an "Apertura and Clausura" format, followed by a Final Four round involving the top four teams of the season to determine the overall champion.

== Torneo Apertura ==
=== First stage ===
Ranking

Pos	Team	Pld	W	L	Pts	SPW	SPL	SPR	SW	SL	SR	Qualification
1	Géminis	13	13	0	26	1049	783	1.340	39	4	9.750	Octogonal
2	Regatas Lima	13	11	2	24	1021	749	1.363	35	7	5.000	Octogonal
3	Divino Maestro	13	11	2	24	987	747	1.321	34	8	4.250	Octogonal
4	Universitario	13	9	4	22	1149	1106	1.039	29	25	1.160	Octogonal
5	Deportivo Alianza	13	8	5	21	1068	1052	1.015	27	22	1.227	Octogonal
6	Universidad César Vallejo	13	7	6	20	1106	1088	1.017	27	25	1.080	Octogonal
7	Camino de Vida	13	7	6	20	943	1033	0.913	23	24	0.958	Octogonal
8	Alianza Lima	13	6	7	19	1047	1049	0.998	24	27	0.889	Octogonal
9	Sporting Cristal	13	5	8	18	1097	1109	0.989	22	28	0.786	
10	Túpac Amaru	13	5	8	18	1009	1069	0.944	22	27	0.815	
11	Latino Amisa	13	4	9	17	1033	1100	0.939	18	31	0.581	
12	Circolo Sportivo Italiano	13	3	10	16	939	1077	0.872	17	31	0.548	
13	UNAS	13	1	12	14	876	1120	0.782	9	37	0.243	
14	Deportivo Wanka	13	1	12	14	856	1098	0.780	8	37	0.216	

==== Results ====
Date		Score		Set 1	Set 2	Set 3	Set 4	Set 5	Total	Report
7 Jul	Divino Maestro	–	Camino de Vida	–	–	–			–	
7 Jul	Géminis	3–0	Universitario	25–22	25–20	27–25			77–67	
9 Jul	Latino Amisa	–	Alianza Lima	–	–	–			–	
9 Jul	Regatas Lima	–	UNAS	–	–	–			–	
10 Jul	Circolo Sportivo Italiano	–	Deportivo Wanka	–	–	–			–	
10 Jul	Deportivo Alianza	–	Túpac Amaru	–	–	–			–	
10 Jul	Géminis	–	UNAS	–	–	–			–	
10 Jul	Camino de Vida	–	Universitario	–	–	–			–	
11 Jul	Divino Maestro	3–0	UNAS	25–9	25–15	25–18			75–42	
11 Jul	Alianza Lima	3–2	Circolo Sportivo Italiano	25–9	22–25	20–25	25–10	15–11	107–80	
11 Jul	Regatas Lima	3–0	Deportivo Wanka	25–11	25–15	25–14			75–40	
11 Jul	Latino Amisa	3–2	Deportivo Alianza	19–25	25–22	17–25	25–10	15–8	101–90	
12 Sep	Universitario	3–2	Alianza Lima	24–26	25–20	17–25	25–19	15–10	106–100	

=== Octogonal ===
==== First leg ====
Date		Score		Set 1	Set 2	Set 3	Set 4	Set 5	Total	Report
7 Dec	Géminis	3–1	Alianza Lima	21–25	25–17	25–19	25–23		96–84	
7 Dec	Regatas Lima	3–1	Camino de Vida	25–10	26–24	21–25	25–11		97–70	
8 Dec	Divino Maestro	3–0	Universidad César Vallejo	25–17	25–23	25–21			75–61	
8 Dec	Universitario	3–1	Deportivo Alianza	19–25	25–23	25–15	25–15		94–78	

==== Second leg ====
Date		Score		Set 1	Set 2	Set 3	Set 4	Set 5	Total	Report
11 Dec	Alianza Lima	0–3	Géminis	21–25	21–25	20–25			62–75	
11 Dec	Camino de Vida	1–3	Regatas Lima	25–21	13–25	21–25	22–25		81–96	
12 Dec	Universidad César Vallejo	1–3	Divino Maestro	25–19	17–25	24–26	20–25		86–105	
12 Dec	Deportivo Alianza	2–3	Universitario	20–25	25–20	20–25	25–16	10–15	100–101	

=== Liguilla ===
Ranking

Pos	Team	Pld	W	L	Pts	SPW	SPL	SPR	SW	SL	SR	Qualification
1	Divino Maestro	3	3	0	6	226	187	1.209	9	0	MAX	Apertura winners, qualified to the Cuadrangular Final
2	Géminis	3	2	1	5	235	220	1.068	6	5	1.200	
3	Universitario	3	1	2	4	260	252	1.032	5	7	0.714	
4	Regatas Lima	3	0	3	3	186	248	0.750	1	9	0.111	

==== Results ====
Date		Score		Set 1	Set 2	Set 3	Set 4	Set 5	Total	Report
15 Dec	Géminis	3–2	Universitario	24–26	11–25	25–22	25–15	15–11	100–99	
15 Dec	Regatas Lima	0–3	Divino Maestro	23–25	21–25	20–25			64–75	
17 Dec	Géminis	3–0	Regatas Lima	25–15	25–15	25–16			75–46	
17 Dec	Universitario	0–3	Divino Maestro	16–25	23–25	24–26			63–76	
18 Dec	Universitario	3–1	Regatas Lima	23–25	25–18	25–20	25–13		98–76	
18 Dec	Divino Maestro	3–0	Géminis	25–17	25–23	25–20			75–60	

== Torneo Clausura ==
=== First stage ===
Ranking

Pos	Team	Pld	W	L	Pts	SPW	SPL	SPR	SW	SL	SR	Qualification
1	Géminis	13	12	1	25	1180	930	1.269	36	13	2.769	Octogonal
2	Divino Maestro	13	11	2	24	1049	816	1.286	34	9	3.778	Octogonal
3	Universidad César Vallejo	13	11	2	24	1102	955	1.154	35	13	2.692	Octogonal
4	Deportivo Alianza	13	10	3	23	1087	979	1.110	32	15	2.133	Octogonal
5	Universitario	13	9	4	22	1092	986	1.108	30	17	1.765	Octogonal
6	Latino Amisa	13	7	6	20	1066	1082	0.985	26	22	1.182	Octogonal
7	Regatas Lima	13	6	7	19	1115	1175	0.949	25	28	0.893	Octogonal
8	Túpac Amaru	13	6	7	19	1076	1146	0.939	24	28	0.857	Octogonal
9	Alianza Lima	13	5	8	18	1069	1089	0.982	23	27	0.852	
10	Sporting Cristal	13	5	8	18	1033	1070	0.965	22	27	0.815	
11	Circolo Sportivo Italiano	13	4	9	17	977	1102	0.887	16	31	0.516	
12	UNAS	13	3	10	16	898	1060	0.847	13	32	0.406	
13	Camino de Vida	13	1	12	14	1022	1178	0.868	13	38	0.342	
14	Deportivo Wanka	13	1	12	14	925	1125	0.822	10	37	0.270	

==== Results ====
Date		Score		Set 1	Set 2	Set 3	Set 4	Set 5	Total	Report
7 Jan	Divino Maestro	3–0	UNAS	25–15	25–18	25–12			75–45	
7 Jan	Deportivo Alianza	3–0	Túpac Amaru	25–21	27–25	25–14			77–60	
8 Jan	Sporting Cristal	3–0	UNAS	25–21	25–12	25–12			75–65	
8 Jan	Latino Amisa	3–1	Regatas Lima	25–23	22–25	25–20	25–22		97–90	
8 Jan	Universitario	3–0	Circolo Sportivo Italiano	25–22	25–14	25–19			75–55	
9 Jan	Divino Maestro	3–0	Deportivo Wanka	25–23	25–17	25–22			75–62	
9 Jan	Géminis	3–0	UNAS	25–19	25–19	25–14			75–52	
9 Jan	Camino de Vida	3–2	Alianza Lima	24–26	18–25	29–27	25–21	15–8	111–107	
12 Jan	Regatas Lima	3–2	UNAS	–	–	–	–	–	109–87	
12 Jan	Géminis	3–0	Latino Amisa	25–13	25–18	25–11			75–42	
13 Jan	Camino de Vida	0–3	UNAS	21–25	15–25	19–25			55–75	
13 Jan	Deportivo Alianza	3–0	Deportivo Wanka	25–23	25–17	25–17			75–57	
14 Jan	Latino Amisa	1–3	UNAS	25–21	26–28	25–27	23–25		99–101	
14 Jan	Universitario	3–0	Alianza Lima	25–13	25–16	25–20			75–49	
15 Jan	Deportivo Wanka	1–3	UNAS	16–25	25–22	20–25	23–25		84–97	
15 Jan	Regatas Lima	3–1	Camino de Vida	18–25	25–18	25–15	25–16		93–74	
15 Jan	Géminis	3–2	Sporting Cristal	25–10	23–25	25–18	18–25	15–4	106–82	
15 Jan	Universidad César Vallejo	3–2	Túpac Amaru	23–25	25–15	24–26	25–15	15–6	112–87	
16 Jan	Universitario	3–0	Túpac Amaru	25–14	25–20	25–22			75–56	
16 Jan	Universidad César Vallejo	3–0	Sporting Cristal	25–12	25–21	25–22			75–55	
16 Jan	Divino Maestro	3–0	Circolo Sportivo Italiano	25–17	25–16	25–17			75–50	
16 Jan	Deportivo Alianza	3–0	Alianza Lima	25–14	25–18	25–22			75–54	
19 Jan	Túpac Amaru	3–1	Circolo Sportivo Italiano	25–20	25–22	24–26	25–12		99–80	
19 Jan	Géminis	3–2	Camino de Vida	18–25	25–17	21–25	25–11	15–10	104–88	
20 Jan	Alianza Lima	3–1	Circolo Sportivo Italiano	23–25	25–20	27–25	25–18		100–88	
20 Jan	Regatas Lima	0–3	Deportivo Alianza	20–25	26–28	18–25			64–78	
21 Jan	Túpac Amaru	3–1	Deportivo Wanka	22–25	25–19	25–19	25–18		97–81	
21 Jan	Universitario	0–3	Universidad César Vallejo	20–25	23–25	20–25			63–75	
22 Jan	Universidad César Vallejo	3–0	Camino de Vida	25–23	27–25	25–19			77–67	
22 Jan	Géminis	3–0	Deportivo Alianza	25–22	25–14	25–23			75–59	
22 Jan	Divino Maestro	0–3	Latino Amisa	23–25	21–25	21–25			65–75	
23 Jan	Deportivo Wanka	0–3	Alianza Lima	20–25	22–25	22–25			64–75	
23 Jan	Latino Amisa	3–0	Sporting Cristal	25–18	30–28	25–18			80–64	
23 Jan	Divino Maestro	3–0	Túpac Amaru	25–22	25–14	25–22			75–58	
23 Jan	Universitario	3–1	Regatas Lima	23–25	25–13	25–11	26–24		99–73	
26 Jan	Divino Maestro	3–0	Sporting Cristal	25–17	25–17	25–11			75–45	
26 Jan	Géminis	3–2	Universitario	25–19	17–25	25–17	21–25	15–8	103–94	
27 Jan	Latino Amisa	3–1	Alianza Lima	25–21	23–25	25–19	25–16		98–81	
27 Jan	Túpac Amaru	2–3	Regatas Lima	22–25	25–19	25–23	22–25	7–15	101–107	
28 Jan	Deportivo Alianza	3–1	Sporting Cristal	19–25	25–19	25–18	25–15		94–77	
28 Jan	Universidad César Vallejo	3–0	Deportivo Wanka	25–18	25–18	25–16			75–52	
29 Jan	Latino Amisa	3–0	Camino de Vida	25–17	25–19	25–22			75–58	
29 Jan	Universidad César Vallejo	3–1	Circolo Sportivo Italiano	25–19	27–29	25–16	25–12		102–76	
29 Jan	Géminis	3–1	Túpac Amaru	25–12	25–15	20–25	25–15		95–67	
29 Jan	Divino Maestro	3–0	Alianza Lima	25–21	25–22	25–17			75–60	
30 Jan	Universitario	1–3	Sporting Cristal	25–27	23–25	25–21	9–25		82–98	
30 Jan	Deportivo Alianza	1–3	Universidad César Vallejo	23–25	15–25	28–26	20–25		86–101	
30 Jan	Camino de Vida	2–3	Circolo Sportivo Italiano	25–21	16–25	25–16	16–25	19–21	101–108	
30 Jan	Regatas Lima	3–1	Deportivo Wanka	25–19	15–25	25–19	25–8		90–71	
2 Feb	Géminis	3–0	Circolo Sportivo Italiano	25–18	25–17	25–19			75–54	
2 Feb	Divino Maestro	1–3	Universitario	23–25	25–21	23–25	26–28		97–99	
3 Feb	Latino Amisa	1–3	Deportivo Alianza	16–25	25–20	9–25	17–25		67–95	
3 Feb	Regatas Lima	3–0	Circolo Sportivo Italiano	25–22	25–22	25–19			75–63	
3 Feb	Sporting Cristal	3–0	Camino de Vida	25–22	25–20	25–11			75–53	
4 Feb	Alianza Lima	3–1	Túpac Amaru	20–25	25–21	25–14	25–14		95–74	
4 Feb	Géminis	3–1	Deportivo Wanka	25–7	25–15	23–25	25–8		98–55	
5 Feb	Universidad César Vallejo	3–0	UNAS	25–23	25–19	25–14			75–56	
5 Feb	Latino Amisa	3–2	Deportivo Wanka	23–25	25–22	23–25	25–16	15–9	111–97	
6 Feb	Universidad César Vallejo	3–2	Alianza Lima	18–25	10–25	25–19	25–15	25–15	103–99	
6 Feb	Regatas Lima	3–1	Sporting Cristal	12–25	25–23	25–22	25–22		87–92	
6 Feb	UNAS	0–3	Circolo Sportivo Italiano	22–25	18–25	17–25			57–75	
6 Feb	Universitario	0–3	Deportivo Alianza	23–25	18–25	23–25			64–75	
6 Feb	Divino Maestro	3–0	Camino de Vida	25–12	25–18	25–17			75–47	
9 Feb	UNAS	0–3	Túpac Amaru	17–25	19–25	17–25			53–75	
9 Feb	Divino Maestro	3–1	Regatas Lima	25–11	25–13	17–25	25–20		92–69	
9 Feb	Universitario	3–1	Camino de Vida	25–19	22–25	25–23	25–23		97–90	
10 Feb	Alianza Lima	3–0	UNAS	25–21	25–17	25–20			75–58	
10 Feb	Sporting Cristal	2–3	Circolo Sportivo Italiano	25–16	25–20	17–25	23–25	15–17	105–103	
11 Feb	Deportivo Alianza	3–2	UNAS	25–15	25–21	19–25	29–31	15–7	113–99	
11 Feb	Géminis	3–1	Universidad César Vallejo	23–25	25–23	25–23	25–11		98–82	
12 Feb	Universitario	3–0	UNAS	25–14	25–22	25–17			75–53	
12 Feb	Universidad César Vallejo	3–1	Regatas Lima	25–20	25–17	20–25	25–18		95–80	
12 Feb	Sporting Cristal	3–0	Deportivo Wanka	25–23	25–18	25–20			75–61	
12 Feb	Latino Amisa	2–3	Túpac Amaru	21–25	25–22	25–27	27–25	9–15	107–114	
13 Feb	Camino de Vida	1–3	Deportivo Wanka	25–21	16–25	23–25	23–25		87–96	
13 Feb	Géminis	3–1	Alianza Lima	25–18	25–18	24–26	25–15		99–77	
13 Feb	Divino Maestro	3–1	Deportivo Alianza	25–19	25–18	17–25	25–16		92–78	
13 Feb	Latino Amisa	3–0	Circolo Sportivo Italiano	25–20	27–25	25–21			77–66	
16 Feb	Alianza Lima	2–3	Sporting Cristal	20–25	25–22	25–19	23–25	10–15	103–106	
16 Feb	Circolo Sportivo Italiano	3–0	Deportivo Wanka	25–23	25–18	25–21			75–62	
17 Feb	Universitario	3–1	Latino Amisa	25–17	25–22	24–26	25–19		99–84	
17 Feb	Géminis	3–2	Regatas Lima	25–16	22–25	25–27	25–22	17–15	114–105	
18 Feb	Deportivo Alianza	3–1	Camino de Vida	19–25	25–20	25–19	25–20		94–84	
18 Feb	Divino Maestro	3–1	Universidad César Vallejo	22–25	25–11	25–10	25–19		97–65	
19 Feb	Sporting Cristal	1–3	Túpac Amaru	12–25	26–28	25–18	23–25		86–96	
19 Feb	Universidad César Vallejo	3–0	Latino Amisa	25–23	25–14	25–17			75–54	
19 Feb	Regatas Lima	1–3	Alianza Lima	15–25	25–20	21–25	12–25		73–95	
20 Feb	Camino de Vida	2–3	Túpac Amaru	25–18	25–17	19–25	24–26	14–16	107–102	
20 Feb	Universitario	3–1	Deportivo Wanka	20–25	25–20	25–22	25–16		95–83	
20 Feb	Divino Maestro	3–0	Géminis	31–29	25–17	25–17			81–63	
20 Feb	Deportivo Alianza	3–1	Circolo Sportivo Italiano	25–18	25–20	23–25	25–22		98–85	

=== Octogonal ===
==== First leg ====
Date		Score		Set 1	Set 2	Set 3	Set 4	Set 5	Total	Report
23 Feb	Géminis	3–1	Túpac Amaru	23–25	25–13	25–18	25–14		98–70	
23 Feb	Divino Maestro	3–0	Regatas Lima	25–15	25–21	26–24			76–60	
24 Feb	Latino Amisa	0–3	Universidad César Vallejo	25–27	24–26	28–30			77–83	
24 Feb	Deportivo Alianza	2–0*	Universitario	26–24	25–12				51–36	

* The match between Deportivo Alianza and Universitario was suspended before the start of the third set due to incidents involving supporters of both teams.

==== Second leg ====
Date		Score		Set 1	Set 2	Set 3	Set 4	Set 5	Total	Report
25 Feb	Túpac Amaru	3–2	Géminis	22–25	26–24	25–21	23–25	15–5	111–110	
25 Feb	Regatas Lima	0–3	Divino Maestro	19–25	23–25	19–25			61–75	
26 Feb	Universidad César Vallejo	3–0	Latino Amisa	26–24	25–17	25–21			76–62	
26 Feb	Deportivo Alianza	3–0*	Universitario	25–0	25–0	25–0			75–0	

* Universitario was disqualified and expelled from the league following the incidents that occurred during the first-leg match against Deportivo Alianza.

==== Extra match ====
Date		Score		Set 1	Set 2	Set 3	Set 4	Set 5	Total	Report
27 Feb	Géminis	3–1	Túpac Amaru	25–17	20–25	25–14	25–20		95–76	

=== Liguilla ===
==== Ranking ====
Pos	Team	Pld	W	L	Pts	SPW	SPL	SPR	SW	SL	SR	Qualification
1	Divino Maestro	3	2	1	5	249	210	1.186	8	3	2.667	Clausura winners, +1 bonus point in the Cuadrangular Final
2	Géminis	3	2	1	5	319	295	1.081	8	7	1.143	
3	Deportivo Alianza	3	1	2	4	233	248	0.940	5	6	0.833	
4	Universidad César Vallejo	3	1	2	4	204	252	0.810	3	8	0.375	

==== Results ====
Date		Score		Set 1	Set 2	Set 3	Set 4	Set 5	Total	Report
1 Mar	Géminis	3–2	Deportivo Alianza	25–17	22–25	26–24	22–25	18–16	113–107	
1 Mar	Universidad César Vallejo	0–3	Divino Maestro	15–25	19–25	21–25			55–75	
2 Mar	Divino Maestro	3–0	Deportivo Alianza	25–19	25–13	25–18			75–50	
2 Mar	Universidad César Vallejo	3–2	Géminis	14–25	25–22	25–18	10–25	15–11	89–101	
3 Mar	Deportivo Alianza	3–0	Universidad César Vallejo	25–16	25–20	26–24			76–60	
3 Mar	Divino Maestro	2–3	Géminis	25–17	25–21	15–25	25–27	9–15	99–105	

== Cuadrangular Final ==
=== Ranking ===
Pos	Team	Pld	W	L	Pts	SPW	SPL	SPR	SW	SL	SR	Qualification
1	Divino Maestro	6	6	0	13	517	409	1.264	18	3	6.000	Champion
2	Géminis	6	4	2	10	500	436	1.147	14	7	2.000	
3	Universidad César Vallejo	6	1	5	7	402	474	0.848	5	16	0.313	
4	Deportivo Alianza	6	1	5	7	442	542	0.815	6	16	0.375	

=== Results ===
Date		Score		Set 1	Set 2	Set 3	Set 4	Set 5	Total	Report
9 Mar	Géminis	3–0	Universidad César Vallejo	25–17	25–19	25–20			75–56	
9 Mar	Divino Maestro	3–1	Deportivo Alianza	19–25	25–22	25–20	25–14		94–81	
12 Mar	Géminis	3–1	Deportivo Alianza	25–14	25–23	25–27	25–18		100–82	
12 Mar	Universidad César Vallejo	0–3	Divino Maestro	25–27	7–25	22–25			54–77	
13 Mar	Deportivo Alianza	1–3	Universidad César Vallejo	12–25	25–21	14–25	16–25		67–96	
13 Mar	Divino Maestro	3–1	Géminis	25–14	17–25	25–17	32–30		99–86	
16 Mar	Universidad César Vallejo	0–3	Géminis	13–25	17–25	18–25			48–75	
16 Mar	Deportivo Alianza	0–3	Divino Maestro	20–25	21–25	12–25			53–75	
18 Mar	Divino Maestro	3–0	Universidad César Vallejo	25–17	25–17	25–13			75–47	
18 Mar	Deportivo Alianza	0–3	Géminis	14–25	16–25	24–26			54–6	
20 Mar	Universidad César Vallejo	2–3	Deportivo Alianza	25–23	19–25	25–15	17–25	15–17	101–105	
20 Mar	Géminis	1–3	Divino Maestro	23–25	25–22	23–25	17–25		88–97	

== Hexagonal por la permanencia ==
Ranking

Pos	Team	Pld	W	L	Pts	SPW	SPL	SPR	SW	SL	SR	Qualification
1	Circolo Sportivo Italiano	5	5	0	10	401	275	1.458	15	1	15.000	
2	Deportivo Wanka	5	4	1	9	362	290	1.248	12	3	4.000	
3	UNAS	5	3	2	8	339	330	1.027	9	6	1.500	Relegation to 2011–12 LNIV
4	Sport Boys (Tarapoto)	5	2	3	7	331	368	0.899	6	10	0.600	Relegation to 2011–12 LNIV
5	ABC San Felipe	5	1	4	6	328	410	0.800	5	12	0.417	Relegation to 2011–12 LNIV
6	Internacional (Arequipa)	5	0	5	5	290	378	0.767	0	15	0.000	Relegation to 2011–12 LNIV

=== Results ===
Date		Score		Set 1	Set 2	Set 3	Set 4	Set 5	Total	Report
13 Apr	Deportivo Wanka	3–0	ABC San Felipe	25–18	25–14	25–15			75–47	
13 Apr	Circolo Sportivo Italiano	3–0	Sport Boys (Tarapoto)	25–9	25–19	25–10			75–38	
15 Apr	UNAS	3–0	ABC San Felipe	25–23	25–17	25–16			75–56	
15 Apr	Deportivo Wanka	3–0	Internacional (Arequipa)	25–15	26–24	25–15			76–54	
16 Apr	UNAS	3–0	Sport Boys (Tarapoto)	25–20	26–24	25–23			76–67	
16 Apr	Circolo Sportivo Italiano	3–0	Internacional (Arequipa)	25–21	25–23	25–13			75–57	
17 Apr	Sport Boys (Tarapoto)	3–0	Internacional (Arequipa)	25–17	25–22	25–17			75–56	
17 Apr	Circolo Sportivo Italiano	3–1	ABC San Felipe	25–12	23–25	25–14	25–12		98–63	
17 Apr	Deportivo Wanka	3–0	UNAS	25–15	25–19	25–22			75–56	
23 Apr	UNAS	3–0	Internacional (Arequipa)	25–19	25–16	25–22			75–57	
23 Apr	Sport Boys (Tarapoto)	3–1	ABC San Felipe	25–18	21–25	25–22	25–20		96–85	
23 Apr	Circolo Sportivo Italiano	3–0	Deportivo Wanka	28–26	25–17	25–17			78–60	
24 Apr	Internacional (Arequipa)	0–3	ABC San Felipe	18–25	24–26	24–26			66–77	
24 Apr	Deportivo Wanka	3–0	Sport Boys (Tarapoto)	26–24	25–16	25–15			76–55	
24 Apr	Circolo Sportivo Italiano	3–0	UNAS	25–15	25–19	25–23			75–57	

== Final standing ==
Rank	Team
1st place, gold medalist(s)	Divino Maestro
2nd place, silver medalist(s)	Géminis
3rd place, bronze medalist(s)	Universidad César Vallejo
4	Deportivo Alianza
5	Regatas Lima
6	Alianza Lima
7	Túpac Amaru
8	Latino Amisa
9	Sporting Cristal
10	Camino de Vida
11	Circolo Sportivo Italiano
12	Deportivo Wanka
13	UNAS
Disqualified	Universitario

Team qualified for the 2011 South American Club Championship
Team lost A1 category

== Individual awards ==
- Most valuable player
  - (Peru) Clarivett Yllescas (Divino Maestro)
- Best spiker
  - (Peru) Clarivett Yllescas (Divino Maestro)
- Best server
  - (Peru) Ingrid Salcedo (Túpac Amaru)
- Best setter
  - (Peru) Zoila La Rosa (Divino Maestro)
- Best blocker
  - (Peru) Mirtha Uribe (Deportivo Alianza)
- Best digger
  - (Peru) Angélica Aquino (Divino Maestro)
- Best libero
  - (Peru) María Fátima Acosta (Deportivo Géminis)
- Best manager
  - (Peru) Martín Escudero (Divino Maestro)
- Best referee
  - (Peru) Rocío Huarcaya
