= 2017–18 Liga Nacional Superior de Voleibol Femenino =

Liga Nacional Superior de Voleibol Femenino
- Association: FPV
- League: Liga Peruana de Vóley Femenino
- Sport: Volleyball
- Duration: December 9, 2017 to April 29, 2018
- Games: 108
- Teams: 10
- Relegated: Sport Performance
- Finals champions: Universidad San Martín (4th title)
- Runners-up: Jaamsa

Seasons
- ← 2016–17 2018–19 →

The 2017–18 Liga Nacional Superior de Voleibol Femenino (Spanish for: 2017–18 Women's Senior National Volleyball League) or 2017–18 LNSV was the 16th official season of the Peruvian Volleyball League. Universidad San Martín were crowned champions after defeating Jaamsa 3–1 in the extra game.

== Teams ==
=== Competing Teams ===
Club	Manager
Alianza Lima	(Peru) Carlos Aparicio
Circolo Sportivo Italiano	(Peru) Walter Lung
Deportivo Alianza	(South Korea) Byung-Tae Seo
Géminis	(Brazil) Marco Queiroga
Jaamsa	(Cuba) Juan Carlos Gala
Regatas Lima	(Spain) Francisco Hervás
Sport Performance Volleyball	(Peru) Antonio Carrasco
Sporting Cristal	(Peru) Martín Escudero
Universidad César Vallejo	(Cuba) Ernesto Despaigne
Universidad San Martín	(Spain) Juan D. García

== First stage ==
The first round is a Round-Robin system where all 10 teams will play once against the other 9.

Pool standing procedure

1. Match points
2. Numbers of matches won
3. Sets ratio
4. Points ratio

Match won 3–0 or 3–1: 3 match points for the winner, 0 match points for the loser
Match won 3–2: 2 match points for the winner, 1 match point for the loser

Ranking

Pos	Team	Pld	W	L	Pts	SPW	SPL	SPR	SW	SL	SR	Qualification
1	Jaamsa	9	9	0	23	794	665	1.194	27	8	3.375	Second stage
2	Universidad San Martín	9	6	3	20	794	679	1.169	24	11	2.182	Second stage
3	Regatas Lima	9	6	3	19	791	755	1.048	22	13	1.692	Second stage
4	Alianza Lima	9	5	4	15	809	765	1.058	19	17	1.118	Second stage
5	Deportivo Alianza	9	5	4	12	768	834	0.921	17	15	1.133	Second stage
6	Géminis	9	4	5	12	869	858	1.013	19	22	0.864	Second stage
7	Sporting Cristal	9	4	5	11	842	877	0.960	18	22	0.818	Second stage
8	Circolo Sportivo Italiano	9	3	6	10	762	793	0.961	15	21	0.714	Second stage
9	Universidad César Vallejo	9	2	7	10	745	812	0.917	15	22	0.682	Cuadrangular por la permanencia
10	Sport Performance Volleyball	9	1	8	3	650	786	0.827	7	26	0.269	Cuadrangular por la permanencia

=== Results ===
Date		Score		Set 1	Set 2	Set 3	Set 4	Set 5	Total	Report
9 Dec	Regatas Lima	3–0	Sport Performance Volleyball	25–23	25–22	25–18			75–63	
9 Dec	Alianza Lima	2–3	Sporting Cristal	18–25	25–13	22–25	25–17	13–15	103–95	
10 Dec	Universidad San Martín	3–0	Deportivo Alianza	25–16	25–14	25–20			75–50	
10 Dec	Géminis	3–2	Universidad César Vallejo	25–22	25–22	22–25	23–25	15–11	110–105	
13 Dec	Jaamsa	3–0	Circolo Sportivo Italiano	25–19	25–20	25–16			75–55	
13 Dec	Regatas Lima	2–3	Deportivo Alianza	25–20	25–19	22–25	22–25	11–15	105–104	
16 Dec	Universidad César Vallejo	3–0	Sport Performance Volleyball	25–21	25–21	25–18			75–60	
16 Dec	Universidad San Martín	2–3	Sporting Cristal	25–17	25–17	20–25	21–25	13–15	104–99	
17 Dec	Géminis	3–1	Circolo Sportivo Italiano	26–28	25–20	25–21	25–20		101–89	
17 Dec	Alianza Lima	0–3	Jaamsa	19–25	19–25	23–25			61–75	
7 Jan	Deportivo Alianza	3–1	Sporting Cristal	26–28	25–18	25–20	25–23		101–89	
7 Jan	Regatas Lima	3–0	Universidad César Vallejo	25–20	25–22	25–17			75–59	
12 Jan	Sport Performance Volleyball	0–3	Circolo Sportivo Italiano	17–25	21–25	14–25			52–75	
12 Jan	Regatas Lima	3–2	Sporting Cristal	25–18	15–25	25–22	29–31	16–14	110–110	
13 Jan	Géminis	1–3	Alianza Lima	17–25	22–25	25–14	10–25		74–89	
13 Jan	Deportivo Alianza	0–3	Jaamsa	14–25	26–28	19–25			59–78	
14 Jan	Universidad César Vallejo	2–3	Circolo Sportivo Italiano	20–25	25–21	18–25	25–20	11–15	99–106	
14 Jan	Sport Performance Volleyball	0–3	Universidad San Martín	19–25	14–25	19–25			52–75	
24 Jan	Universidad San Martín	2–3	Jaamsa	23–25	20–25	25–21	25–16	12–15	105–102	
26 Jan	Regatas Lima	3–1	Circolo Sportivo Italiano	25–19	21–25	25–19	25–20		96–83	
26 Jan	Sport Performance Volleyball	1–3	Alianza Lima	17–25	26–28	25–23	18–25		86–101	
27 Jan	Sporting Cristal	0–3	Jaamsa	22–25	15–25	17–25			54–75	
27 Jan	Universidad San Martín	3–2	Géminis	25–13	25–20	24–26	21–25	15–12	110–96	
28 Jan	Deportivo Alianza	2–3	Sport Performance Volleyball	17–25	25–17	25–15	23–25	9–15	99–97	
28 Jan	Universidad César Vallejo	1–3	Alianza Lima	19–25	23–25	25–18	15–25		82–93	
31 Jan	Sporting Cristal	2–3	Géminis	25–19	20–25	25–21	18–25	8–15	96–105	
2 Feb	Regatas Lima	2–3	Jaamsa	25–19	22–25	18–25	28–26	5–15	98–110	
2 Feb	Circolo Sportivo Italiano	3–1	Alianza Lima	25–20	24–26	25–19	25–23		99–88	
3 Feb	Universidad César Vallejo	0–3	Universidad San Martín	22–25	14–25	17–25			53–75	
3 Feb	Sporting Cristal	3–1	Sport Performance Volleyball	25–23	27–29	25–15	25–23		102–90	
4 Feb	Deportivo Alianza	3–2	Géminis	10–25	25–21	17–25	27–25	15–13	94–109	
4 Feb	Regatas Lima	3–1	Alianza Lima	25–22	19–25	26–24	25–17		95–88	
7 Feb	Jaamsa	3–0	Sport Performance Volleyball	25–23	25–11	25–19			75–53	
9 Feb	Circolo Sportivo Italiano	0–3	Universidad San Martín	14–25	18–25	22–25			54–75	
10 Feb	Sporting Cristal	1–3	Universidad César Vallejo	24–26	18–25	25–18	22–25		89–94	
10 Feb	Jaamsa	3–2	Géminis	19–25	25–21	19–25	25–22	15–9	103–102	
11 Feb	Alianza Lima	3–0	Deportivo Alianza	25–19	25–19	25–21			75–59	
11 Feb	Regatas Lima	0–3	Universidad San Martín	23–25	21–25	18–25			62–75	
15 Feb	Regatas Lima	3–0	Géminis	25–21	25–23	25–19			75–63	
16 Feb	Universidad César Vallejo	2–3	Deportivo Alianza	21–25	25–21	25–17	17–25	11–15	99–103	
16 Feb	Circolo Sportivo Italiano	2–3	Sporting Cristal	25–22	25–21	22–25	12–25	11–15	95–108	
17 Feb	Jaamsa	3–2	Universidad César Vallejo	25–12	17–25	19–25	25–6	15–10	101–78	
17 Feb	Géminis	3–2	Sport Performance Volleyball	23–25	25–18	25–21	21–25	15–8	109–97	
18 Feb	Circolo Sportivo Italiano	2–3	Deportivo Alianza	25–17	21–25	22–25	25–17	13–15	106–99	
18 Feb	Alianza Lima	3–2	Universidad San Martín	21–25	24–26	25–17	26–24	15–8	111–110	

== Cuadrangular por la permanencia ==
Ranking

Pos	Team	Pld	W	L	Pts	SPW	SPL	SPR	SW	SL	SR	Qualification
1	Túpac Amaru	3	3	0	8	272	229	1.188	9	2	4.500	
2	Universidad César Vallejo	3	2	1	6	246	195	1.262	6	4	1.500	
3	Rebaza Acosta	3	1	2	4	247	297	0.832	6	7	0.857	Relegation to 2018–19 LNIV
4	Sport Performance Volleyball	3	0	3	0	187	256	0.730	1	9	0.111	Relegation to 2018–19 LNIV

=== Results ===
==== Round 1 ====
Date		Score		Set 1	Set 2	Set 3	Set 4	Set 5	Total	Report
27 Feb	Sport Performance Volleyball	1–3	Rebaza Acosta	14–25	28–26	22–25	18–25		82–101	
27 Feb	Universidad César Vallejo	0–3	Túpac Amaru	25–27	23–25	23–25			71–77	

==== Round 2 ====
Date		Score		Set 1	Set 2	Set 3	Set 4	Set 5	Total	Report
28 Feb	Universidad César Vallejo	3–1	Rebaza Acosta	25–15	25–27	25–8	25–21		100–71	
28 Feb	Sport Performance Volleyball	0–3	Túpac Amaru	13–25	28–30	17–25			58–80	

==== Round 3 ====
Date		Score		Set 1	Set 2	Set 3	Set 4	Set 5	Total	Report
1 Mar	Rebaza Acosta	2–3	Túpac Amaru	25–21	31–29	13–25	18–25	13–15	100–115	
1 Mar	Universidad César Vallejo	3–0	Sport Performance Volleyball	25–22	25–13	25–12			75–47	

== Second stage ==
The second stage of the tournament will see the best 8 teams from the first stage compete in another Round-Robin system, according to the finishing will be the play-offs.

Pool standing procedure

1. Match points
2. Numbers of matches won
3. Sets ratio
4. Points ratio

Match won 3–0 or 3–1: 3 match points for the winner, 0 match points for the loser
Match won 3–2: 2 match points for the winner, 1 match point for the loser

Ranking

Pos	Team	Pld	W	L	Pts	SPW	SPL	SPR	SW	SL	SR	Qualification
1	Jaamsa	16	14	2	37	1413	1251	1.129	44	20	2.200	Third stage
2	Regatas Lima	16	11	5	35	1378	1257	1.096	39	21	1.857	Third stage
3	Universidad San Martín	16	11	5	32	1425	1272	1.120	40	24	1.667	Third stage
4	Alianza Lima	16	9	7	26	1460	1376	1.061	35	30	1.167	Third stage
5	Géminis	16	7	9	22	1448	1467	0.987	32	36	0.889	Third stage
6	Sporting Cristal	16	7	9	22	1418	1433	0.990	31	36	0.861	Third stage
7	Deportivo Alianza	16	7	9	18	1292	1468	0.880	26	39	0.667	Third stage
8	Circolo Sportivo Italiano	16	4	12	14	1401	1508	0.929	26	41	0.634	Third stage

=== Results ===
==== Round 1 ====
Date		Score		Set 1	Set 2	Set 3	Set 4	Set 5	Total	Report
9 Mar	Regatas Lima	3–0	Géminis	25–20	25–13	25–23			75–56	
9 Mar	Jaamsa	3–1	Circolo Sportivo Italiano	25–17	25–16	23–25	25–16		98–74	
10 Mar	Universidad San Martín	3–2	Sporting Cristal	20–25	21–25	25–20	25–19	15–12	106–101	
10 Mar	Alianza Lima	3–0	Deportivo Alianza	30–28	25–13	25–11			80–52	

==== Round 2 ====
Date		Score		Set 1	Set 2	Set 3	Set 4	Set 5	Total	Report
11 Mar	Circolo Sportivo Italiano	2–3	Géminis	22–25	25–16	30–32	25–21	13–15	115–109	
11 Mar	Sporting Cristal	2–3	Jaamsa	18–25	16–25	25–20	25–12	11–15	95–97	
15 Mar	Regatas Lima	3–1	Alianza Lima	23–25	30–28	25–18	25–16		103–87	
15 Mar	Universidad San Martín	1–3	Deportivo Alianza	25–17	21–25	18–25	24–26		64–93	

==== Round 3 ====
Date		Score		Set 1	Set 2	Set 3	Set 4	Set 5	Total	Report
16 Mar	Jaamsa	3–0	Géminis	25–19	25–22	25–20			75–61	
16 Mar	Sporting Cristal	3–1	Deportivo Alianza	25–11	25–15	24–26	25–10		99–62	
17 Mar	Circolo Sportivo Italiano	2–3	Alianza Lima	19–25	25–20	25–22	17–25	11–15	97–107	
17 Mar	Universidad San Martín	0–3	Regatas Lima	19–25	17–25	12–25			48–75	

==== Round 4 ====
Date		Score		Set 1	Set 2	Set 3	Set 4	Set 5	Total	Report
18 Mar	Deportivo Alianza	3–2	Jaamsa	17–25	25–22	25–17	7–25	15–12	89–101	
18 Mar	Géminis	2–3	Alianza Lima	25–21	28–30	25–22	17–25	10–15	105–113	
22 Mar	Sporting Cristal	3–0	Regatas Lima	25–19	25–16	25–18			75–53	
22 Mar	Circolo Sportivo Italiano	1–3	Universidad San Martín	14–25	25–22	23–25	13–25		75–97	

==== Round 5 ====
Date		Score		Set 1	Set 2	Set 3	Set 4	Set 5	Total	Report
24 Mar	Deportivo Alianza	0–3	Regatas Lima	15–25	19–25	20–25			54–75	
24 Mar	Jaamsa	3–1	Alianza Lima	25–19	19–25	25–21	25–19		94–84	
25 Mar	Géminis	2–3	Universidad San Martín	21–25	25–21	18–25	27–25	6–15	97–111	
25 Mar	Sporting Cristal	3–1	Circolo Sportivo Italiano	17–25	25–23	25–20	25–20		92–88	

==== Round 6 ====
Date		Score		Set 1	Set 2	Set 3	Set 4	Set 5	Total	Report
28 Mar	Géminis	3–0	Sporting Cristal	25–20	25–21	25–19			75–60	
28 Mar	Deportivo Alianza	2–3	Circolo Sportivo Italiano	25–23	25–19	23–25	31–33	10–15	114–115	
1 Apr	Regatas Lima	2–3	Jaamsa	25–19	24–26	25–27	25–20	9–15	108–107	
1 Apr	Alianza Lima	2–3	Universidad San Martín	25–23	22–25	25–18	21–25	12–15	105–106	

==== Round 7 ====
Date		Score		Set 1	Set 2	Set 3	Set 4	Set 5	Total	Report
3 Apr	Alianza Lima	3–0	Sporting Cristal	25–20	25–18	25–16			75–54	
3 Apr	Deportivo Alianza	0–3	Géminis	24–26	22–25	14–25			62–76	
4 Apr	Jaamsa	0–3	Universidad San Martín	18–25	15–25	14–25			47–75	
4 Apr	Regatas Lima	3–1	Circolo Sportivo Italiano	25–22	25–17	23–25	25–11		98–75	

== Third stage ==
=== Quarterfinals ===
==== First leg ====
Date		Score		Set 1	Set 2	Set 3	Set 4	Set 5	Total	Report
6 Apr	Jaamsa	3–1	Circolo Sportivo Italiano	25–12	23–25	25–20	25–18		98–75	
6 Apr	Alianza Lima	3–2	Géminis	23–25	28–30	25–17	26–24	15–13	117–109	
7 Apr	Universidad San Martín	3–2	Sporting Cristal	25–18	15–25	25–14	20–25	15–8	100–90	
7 Apr	Regatas Lima	3–0	Deportivo Alianza	25–21	25–19	25–20			75–60	

==== Second leg ====
Date		Score		Set 1	Set 2	Set 3	Set 4	Set 5	Total	Report
8 Apr	Circolo Sportivo Italiano	3–0	Jaamsa	25–23	25–19	25–14			75–56	
8 Apr	Géminis	3–0	Alianza Lima	25–20	25–23	25–15			75–58	
11 Apr	Universidad San Martín	3–1	Sporting Cristal	25–19	15–25	25–21	25–23		90–88	
11 Apr	Deportivo Alianza	3–0	Regatas Lima	25–0	25–0	25–0			75–0	

==== Extra game ====
Date		Score		Set 1	Set 2	Set 3	Set 4	Set 5	Total	Report
15 Apr	Jaamsa	3–1	Circolo Sportivo Italiano	25–15	22–25	25–18	26–24		88–82	
15 Apr	Alianza Lima	3–2	Géminis	25–19	25–17	26–28	18–25	15–10	109–99	
15 Apr	Regatas Lima	3–2	Deportivo Alianza	25–22	23–25	23–25	25–23	15–11	111–106	

== Fourth stage ==
=== Semifinals ===
==== First leg ====
Date		Score		Set 1	Set 2	Set 3	Set 4	Set 5	Total	Report
20 Apr	Jaamsa	3–2	Alianza Lima	22–25	25–22	21–25	25–21	15–11	108–104	
20 Apr	Regatas Lima	0–3	Universidad San Martín	16–25	22–25	19–25			57–75	

==== Second leg ====
Date		Score		Set 1	Set 2	Set 3	Set 4	Set 5	Total	Report
21 Apr	Alianza Lima	0–3	Jaamsa	25–27	18–25	23–25			66–77	
21 Apr	Universidad San Martín	3–0	Regatas Lima	25–23	25–23	25–16			75–62	

== Fifth stage ==
=== Bronze Medal Matches ===
==== First leg ====
Date		Score		Set 1	Set 2	Set 3	Set 4	Set 5	Total	Report
27 Apr	Regatas Lima	1–3	Alianza Lima	22–25	22–25	25–15	15–25		84–90	

==== Second leg ====
Date		Score		Set 1	Set 2	Set 3	Set 4	Set 5	Total	Report
28 Apr	Alianza Lima	0–3	Regatas Lima	28–30	22–25	21–25			71–80	

==== Extra game ====
Date		Score		Set 1	Set 2	Set 3	Set 4	Set 5	Total	Report
29 Apr	Alianza Lima	2–3	Regatas Lima	27–29	21–25	25–22	25–23	11–15	109–116	

=== Gold Medal Matches ===
==== First leg ====
Date		Score		Set 1	Set 2	Set 3	Set 4	Set 5	Total	Report
27 Apr	Universidad San Martín	0–3	Jaamsa	14–25	20–25	23–25			57–75	

==== Second leg ====
Date		Score		Set 1	Set 2	Set 3	Set 4	Set 5	Total	Report
28 Apr	Jaamsa	1–3	Universidad San Martín	25–21	21–25	21–25	19–25		86–96	

==== Extra game ====
Date		Score		Set 1	Set 2	Set 3	Set 4	Set 5	Total	Report
29 Apr	Universidad San Martín	3–1	Jaamsa	22–25	25–19	25–23	30–28		102–95	

== Final standing ==
Rank	Team
1st place, gold medalist(s)	Universidad San Martín
2nd place, silver medalist(s)	Jaamsa
3rd place, bronze medalist(s)	Regatas Lima
4	Alianza Lima
5	Géminis
6	Sporting Cristal
7	Deportivo Alianza
8	Circolo Sportivo Italiano
9	Universidad César Vallejo
10	Sport Performance Volleyball

Team qualified for the 2019 South American Club Championship
Team lost A1 category

2017–18 Liga Nacional Superior de Voleibol;

Universidad San Martín
4th title

== Awards ==
=== Individual awards ===
- Best scorer
  - (Peru) Daniela Uribe (Alianza Lima)
- Best spiker
  - (Cuba) Regla Gracia (Jaamsa)
- Best outside hitter
  - (Cuba) Sulian Matienzo (Jaamsa)
- Best blocker
  - (Canada) Alicia Perrin (Universidad San Martín)
- Best setter
  - (Peru) Zaira Manzo (Jaamsa)
- Best server
  - (Peru) Mabel Olemar (Jaamsa)
- Best libero
  - (Peru) Miriam Patiño (Regatas Lima)
