= 2016–17 Liga Nacional Superior de Voleibol Femenino =

Liga Nacional Superior de Voleibol Femenino
- Association: FPV
- League: Liga Peruana de Vóley Femenino
- Sport: Volleyball
- Duration: December 3, 2016 to April 29, 2017
- Games: 108
- Teams: 11
- Relegated: Túpac Amaru
- Finals champions: Regatas Lima (6th title)
- Runners-up: Universidad San Martín

Seasons
- ← 2015–16 2017–18 →

The 2016–17 Liga Nacional Superior de Voleibol Femenino (Spanish for: 2016–17 Women's Senior National Volleyball League) or 2016–17 LNSV was the 15th official season of the Peruvian Volleyball League. Regatas Lima were crowned champions after defeating Universidad San Martín 3–0 in the second leg.

== Teams ==
=== Competing Teams ===
Club	Manager
Alianza Lima	(Peru) Carlos Aparicio
Circolo Sportivo Italiano	(Peru) César Arrese
Deportivo Alianza	(Peru) Luis Milla
Géminis	(Brazil) Marco Queiroga
Jaamsa	(Cuba) Juan Carlos Gala
Regatas Lima	(Spain) Francisco Hervás
Sport Performance Volleyball	(Peru) Antonio Carrasco
Sporting Cristal	(Peru) Walter Lung
Túpac Amaru	(Peru) José Castillo
Universidad César Vallejo	(Peru) Natalia Málaga
Universidad San Martín	(Spain) Juan D. García

== First stage ==
The first round is a Round-Robin system where all 11 teams will play once against the other 10.

Pool standing procedure

1. Numbers of matches won
2. Match points
3. Sets ratio
4. Points ratio

Match won 3–0 or 3–1: 3 match points for the winner, 0 match points for the loser
Match won 3–2: 2 match points for the winner, 1 match point for the loser

Ranking

Pos	Team	Pld	W	L	Pts	SPW	SPL	SPR	SW	SL	SR	Qualification
1	Géminis	10	9	1	26	855	689	1.241	28	8	3.500	Second stage
2	Alianza Lima	10	8	2	25	789	628	1.256	26	7	3.714	Second stage
3	Universidad San Martín	10	9	1	27	865	679	1.274	29	7	4.143	Second stage
4	Jaamsa	10	8	2	23	802	738	1.087	25	10	2.500	Second stage
5	Regatas Lima	10	6	4	18	789	672	1.174	20	13	1.538	Second stage
6	Circolo Sportivo Italiano	10	4	6	13	772	770	1.003	16	20	0.800	Second stage
7	Sporting Cristal	10	4	6	10	736	815	0.903	13	23	0.565	Second stage
8	Universidad César Vallejo	10	2	8	8	727	808	0.900	11	25	0.440	Second stage
9	Túpac Amaru	10	2	8	6	694	800	0.868	10	24	0.417	Hexagonal por la permanencia
10	Sport Performance Volleyball	10	2	8	5	605	798	0.758	6	27	0.222	Hexagonal por la permanencia
11	Deportivo Alianza	10	1	9	4	624	861	0.725	8	28	0.286	Hexagonal por la permanencia

=== Results ===
Date		Score		Set 1	Set 2	Set 3	Set 4	Set 5	Total	Report
3 Dec	Universidad César Vallejo	3–1	Túpac Amaru	25–21	25–19	21–25	25–20		96–85	
3 Dec	Sporting Cristal	3–2	Circolo Sportivo Italiano	26–24	21–25	10–25	25–23	15–11	97–108	
4 Dec	Géminis	3–0	Sport Performance Volleyball	25–11	25–15	25–11			75–37	
4 Dec	Jaamsa	0–3	Alianza Lima	16–25	16–25	9–25			41–75	
8 Dec	Regatas Lima	1–3	Alianza Lima	25–23	20–25	22–25	24–26		91–99	
8 Dec	Universidad San Martín	3–0	Sport Performance Volleyball	25–17	25–9	25–16			75–42	
10 Dec	Regatas Lima	3–0	Deportivo Alianza	25–4	25–15	25–10			75–29	
10 Dec	Géminis	3–0	Circolo Sportivo Italiano	25–22	25–14	25–16			75–52	
11 Dec	Universidad César Vallejo	0–3	Alianza Lima	11–25	12–25	21–25			44–75	
11 Dec	Sporting Cristal	0–3	Jaamsa	21–25	14–25	23–25			58–75	
16 Dec	Universidad San Martín	3–0	Deportivo Alianza	25–12	25–12	25–18			75–42	
16 Dec	Regatas Lima	3–0	Túpac Amaru	25–19	25–16	25–18			75–53	
17 Dec	Universidad César Vallejo	2–3	Sporting Cristal	25–18	21–25	11–25	26–24	12–15	95–107	
17 Dec	Géminis	3–1	Jaamsa	25–16	25–20	23–25	25–15		98–76	
7 Jan	Sport Performance Volleyball	0–3	Circolo Sportivo Italiano	18–25	18–25	18–25			54–75	
7 Jan	Túpac Amaru	1–3	Universidad San Martín	19–25	25–21	21–25	17–25		82–96	
8 Jan	Géminis	3–1	Universidad César Vallejo	25–18	25–22	20–25	25–15		95–80	
8 Jan	Regatas Lima	3–0	Sporting Cristal	25–14	25–7	25–20			75–41	
13 Jan	Sport Performance Volleyball	0–3	Jaamsa	23–25	15–25	15–25			53–75	
13 Jan	Túpac Amaru	3–0	Deportivo Alianza	25–10	25–22	26–24			76–56	
14 Jan	Sport Performance Volleyball	3–2	Universidad César Vallejo	25–19	25–23	21–25	19–25	15–13	105–105	
14 Jan	Circolo Sportivo Italiano	0–3	Universidad San Martín	13–25	19–25	12–25			44–75	
15 Jan	Deportivo Alianza	0–3	Alianza Lima	8–25	12–25	13–25			33–75	
15 Jan	Géminis	3–1	Regatas Lima	17–25	26–24	25–22	25–22		93–93	
20 Jan	Túpac Amaru	0–3	Alianza Lima	18–25	18–25	10–25			46–75	
20 Jan	Deportivo Alianza	3–1	Sporting Cristal	21–25	25–22	25–22	25–15		96–84	
21 Jan	Géminis	3–2	Deportivo Alianza	25–17	25–11	21–25	23–25	15–5	109–83	
21 Jan	Circolo Sportivo Italiano	1–3	Jaamsa	25–23	18–25	15–25	15–25		73–98	
22 Jan	Túpac Amaru	1–3	Sporting Cristal	14–25	22–25	25–22	23–25		84–97	
22 Jan	Alianza Lima	2–3	Universidad San Martín	13–25	24–26	25–23	31–29	12–15	105–118	
27 Jan	Circolo Sportivo Italiano	3–0	Universidad César Vallejo	25–20	25–18	25–15			75–53	
27 Jan	Sport Performance Volleyball	3–1	Deportivo Alianza	29–27	12–25	25–20	25–20		91–92	
28 Jan	Túpac Amaru	0–3	Géminis	20–25	16–25	16–25			52–75	
28 Jan	Alianza Lima	3–0	Sporting Cristal	25–21	25–18	25–23			75–62	
29 Jan	Sport Performance Volleyball	0–3	Regatas Lima	21–25	14–25	22–25			57–75	
29 Jan	Jaamsa	3–2	Universidad San Martín	25–20	17–25	25–19	20–25	17–15	104–104	
3 Feb	Universidad César Vallejo	0–3	Universidad San Martín	18–25	22–25	17–25			57–75	
3 Feb	Jaamsa	3–0	Regatas Lima	25–23	25–21	25–19			75–63	
4 Feb	Circolo Sportivo Italiano	3–1	Deportivo Alianza	25–16	25–17	23–25	25–12		98–70	
4 Feb	Géminis	3–0	Alianza Lima	25–20	25–19	25–20			75–59	
5 Feb	Jaamsa	3–0	Universidad César Vallejo	25–22	25–17	25–22			75–61	
5 Feb	Sporting Cristal	0–3	Universidad San Martín	15–25	18–25	21–25			54–75	
10 Feb	Circolo Sportivo Italiano	1–3	Regatas Lima	25–23	22–25	27–29	15–25		89–102	
10 Feb	Túpac Amaru	3–0	Sport Performance Volleyball	25–18	25–20	25–14			75–52	
11 Feb	Jaamsa	3–1	Deportivo Alianza	25–14	30–28	23–25	25–15		103–82	
11 Feb	Géminis	1–3	Universidad San Martín	21–25	25–22	19–25	19–25		84–97	
12 Feb	Sporting Cristal	3–0	Sport Performance Volleyball	26–24	25–15	25–17			76–56	
12 Feb	Universidad César Vallejo	0–3	Regatas Lima	19–25	23–25	19–25			61–75	
12 Feb	Alianza Lima	3–0	Circolo Sportivo Italiano	25–16	25–20	26–24			76–60	
18 Feb	Túpac Amaru	1–3	Circolo Sportivo Italiano	25–23	15–25	11–25	18–25		70–98	
18 Feb	Alianza Lima	3–0	Sport Performance Volleyball	25–21	25–18	25–19			75–58	
19 Feb	Universidad César Vallejo	3–0	Deportivo Alianza	25–14	25–12	25–15			75–41	
19 Feb	Géminis	3–0	Sporting Cristal	25–20	26–24	25–16			76–60	
25 Feb	Jaamsa	3–0	Túpac Amaru	25–20	28–26	27–25			80–71	
25 Feb	Universidad San Martín	3–0	Regatas Lima	25–23	25–20	25–22			75–65	

== Hexagonal por la permanencia ==
Ranking

Pos	Team	Pld	W	L	Pts	SPW	SPL	SPR	SW	SL	SR	Qualification
1	Deportivo Alianza	5	4	1	13	433	382	1.134	14	4	3.500	
2	Sport Performance Volleyball	5	5	0	13	485	424	1.144	15	7	2.143	
3	Túpac Amaru	5	3	2	10	463	405	1.143	12	8	1.500	Relegation to 2017–18 LNIV
4	Star Net	5	1	4	4	369	437	0.844	6	13	0.462	Relegation to 2017–18 LNIV
5	Divino Maestro	5	1	4	3	409	442	0.925	6	13	0.462	Relegation to 2017–18 LNIV
6	Rebaza Acosta	5	1	4	3	358	427	0.838	5	13	0.385	Relegation to 2017–18 LNIV

=== Results ===
==== Round 1 ====
Date		Score		Set 1	Set 2	Set 3	Set 4	Set 5	Total	Report
1 Mar	Star Net	0–3	Deportivo Alianza	17–25	21–25	12–25			50–75	
1 Mar	Divino Maestro	1–3	Sport Performance Volleyball	17–25	25–21	20–25	21–25		83–96	
1 Mar	Túpac Amaru	3–1	Rebaza Acosta	21–25	25–12	25–14	25–20		96–71	

==== Round 2 ====
Date		Score		Set 1	Set 2	Set 3	Set 4	Set 5	Total	Report
2 Mar	Divino Maestro	3–1	Star Net	20–25	25–15	25–19	25–22		95–81	
2 Mar	Sport Performance Volleyball	3–0	Rebaza Acosta	25–14	25–13	25–19			75–46	
2 Mar	Túpac Amaru	1–3	Deportivo Alianza	27–29	25–23	17–25	21–25		90–102	

==== Round 3 ====
Date		Score		Set 1	Set 2	Set 3	Set 4	Set 5	Total	Report
3 Mar	Rebaza Acosta	0–3	Deportivo Alianza	16–25	25–27	23–25			64–77	
3 Mar	Sport Performance Volleyball	3–2	Star Net	17–25	25–18	23–25	25–18	15–3	105–89	
3 Mar	Túpac Amaru	3–1	Divino Maestro	25–19	22–25	25–21	25–17		97–82	

==== Round 4 ====
Date		Score		Set 1	Set 2	Set 3	Set 4	Set 5	Total	Report
4 Mar	Rebaza Acosta	1–3	Star Net	22–25	25–21	18–25	20–25		85–96	
4 Mar	Túpac Amaru	2–3	Sport Performance Volleyball	25–12	25–18	24–26	22–25	8–15	103–97	
4 Mar	Divino Maestro	0–3	Deportivo Alianza	16–25	25–27	23–25			64–77	

==== Round 5 ====
Date		Score		Set 1	Set 2	Set 3	Set 4	Set 5	Total	Report
5 Mar	Túpac Amaru	3–0	Star Net	25–13	25–15	27–25			77–53	
5 Mar	Divino Maestro	1–3	Rebaza Acosta	14–25	23–25	25–17	21–25		83–92	
5 Mar	Sport Performance Volleyball	3–2	Deportivo Alianza	25–20	28–30	19–25	25–17	15–11	112–103	

== Second stage ==
The second stage of the tournament will see the best 8 teams from the first stage compete in another Round-Robin system, according to the finishing will be the play-offs.

Pool standing procedure

1. Match points
2. Numbers of matches won
3. Sets ratio
4. Points ratio

Match won 3–0 or 3–1: 3 match points for the winner, 0 match points for the loser
Match won 3–2: 2 match points for the winner, 1 match point for the loser

Ranking

Pos	Team	Pld	W	L	Pts	SPW	SPL	SPR	SW	SL	SR	Qualification
1	Géminis	17	15	2	42	1443	1228	1.175	46	16	2.875	Third stage
2	Alianza Lima	17	13	4	40	1415	1199	1.180	44	16	2.750	Third stage
3	Universidad San Martín	17	13	4	39	1422	1258	1.130	44	20	2.200	Third stage
4	Jaamsa	17	12	5	35	1432	1338	1.070	41	22	1.864	Third stage
5	Regatas Lima	17	11	6	33	1386	1178	1.177	36	22	1.636	Third stage
6	Circolo Sportivo Italiano	17	5	12	17	1276	1310	0.974	23	37	0.622	Third stage
7	Sporting Cristal	17	5	12	13	1217	1424	0.855	19	43	0.442	Third stage
8	Universidad César Vallejo	17	3	14	12	1288	1483	0.869	20	45	0.444	Third stage

=== Results ===
Date		Score		Set 1	Set 2	Set 3	Set 4	Set 5	Total	Report
3 Mar	Alianza Lima	3–0	Circolo Sportivo Italiano	25–20	25–22	25–22			75–64	
8 Mar	Jaamsa	1–3	Regatas Lima	25–27	19–25	25–23	14–25		83–100	
10 Mar	Universidad San Martín	3–0	Universidad César Vallejo	25–17	25–20	25–20			75–57	
10 Mar	Géminis	3–0	Sporting Cristal	25–15	25–18	25–8			75–41	
11 Mar	Circolo Sportivo Italiano	3–2	Universidad César Vallejo	25–21	14–25	25–23	24–26	15–12	103–107	
11 Mar	Alianza Lima	2–3	Jaamsa	25–22	17–25	25–17	29–31	13–15	109–110	
12 Mar	Sporting Cristal	1–3	Universidad San Martín	11–25	18–25	25–18	12–25		66–93	
12 Mar	Géminis	3–0	Regatas Lima	25–21	25–22	25–22			75–65	
15 Mar	Universidad San Martín	3–2	Jaamsa	25–20	25–19	18–25	19–25	15–9	102–96	
15 Mar	Sporting Cristal	0–3	Regatas Lima	14–25	17–25	15–25			46–75	
17 Mar	Circolo Sportivo Italiano	2–3	Géminis	25–19	24–26	23–25	25–20	19–21	116–111	
17 Mar	Sporting Cristal	0–3	Alianza Lima	22–25	19–25	27–29			68–79	
18 Mar	Circolo Sportivo Italiano	0–3	Jaamsa	23–25	19–25	23–25			60–75	
18 Mar	Regatas Lima	3–1	Universidad San Martín	25–18	25–21	23–25	25–18		98–82	
19 Mar	Sporting Cristal	2–3	Universidad César Vallejo	20–25	30–32	25–18	25–15	12–15	112–105	
19 Mar	Géminis	0–3	Alianza Lima	15–25	26–28	12–25			53–78	
24 Mar	Universidad César Vallejo	0–3	Géminis	16–25	20–25	18–25			54–75	
24 Mar	Jaamsa	3–0	Sporting Cristal	25–16	25–16	25–19			75–51	
25 Mar	Regatas Lima	3–1	Universidad César Vallejo	25–16	22–25	25–15	25–10		97–66	
25 Mar	Alianza Lima	1–3	Universidad San Martín	18–25	12–25	29–27	20–25		79–102	
26 Mar	Circolo Sportivo Italiano	2–3	Sporting Cristal	25–13	25–18	20–25	24–26	13–15	107–97	
26 Mar	Jaamsa	1–3	Géminis	15–25	23–25	25–17	19–25		82–92	
29 Mar	Universidad San Martín	0–3*	Circolo Sportivo Italiano	0–25	0–25	0–25			0–75	
29 Mar	Regatas Lima	1–3	Alianza Lima	19–25	21–25	27–25	21–25		88–100	
31 Mar	Universidad César Vallejo	1–3	Jaamsa	34–32	18–25	19–25	15–25		86–107	
31 Mar	Regatas Lima	3–0	Circolo Sportivo Italiano	25–17	25–19	25–18			75–54	
1 Apr	Alianza Lima	3–2	Universidad César Vallejo	25–16	21–25	20–25	25–13	15–7	106–86	
1 Apr	Universidad San Martín	2–3	Géminis	22–25	18–25	25–20	25–22	13–15	103–107	

* Originally, Universidad San Martín defeated Circolo Sportivo Italiano 3–0 in sets (25–15, 25–20, 25–13). However, due to an improper lineup, as they had three foreign players on the court, Universidad San Martín was ruled to have forfeited the match, and the result was officially recorded as a 3–0 victory in favor of Circolo Sportivo Italiano.

== Third stage ==
=== Quarterfinals ===
==== First leg ====
Date		Score		Set 1	Set 2	Set 3	Set 4	Set 5	Total	Report
5 Apr	Géminis	3–0	Universidad César Vallejo	25–17	25–22	25–22			75–61	
5 Apr	Universidad San Martín	3–0	Circolo Sportivo Italiano	25–15	25–20	25–18			75–53	
7 Apr	Alianza Lima	3–0	Sporting Cristal	25–12	25–16	25–19			75–47	
7 Apr	Jaamsa	1–3	Regatas Lima	21–25	20–25	25–22	19–25		85–97	

==== Second leg ====
Date		Score		Set 1	Set 2	Set 3	Set 4	Set 5	Total	Report
8 Apr	Géminis	3–0	Universidad César Vallejo	25–21	25–19	25–23			75–63	
8 Apr	Universidad San Martín	3–0	Circolo Sportivo Italiano	25–20	25–19	25–16			75–55	
9 Apr	Alianza Lima	3–0	Sporting Cristal	25–15	25–21	25–21			75–57	
9 Apr	Jaamsa	1–3	Regatas Lima	25–23	20–25	19–25	22–25		86–98	

== Fourth stage ==
=== Semifinals ===
==== First leg ====
Date		Score		Set 1	Set 2	Set 3	Set 4	Set 5	Total	Report
14 Apr	Géminis	0–3	Regatas Lima	18–25	20–25	19–25			57–75	
14 Apr	Alianza Lima	1–3	Universidad San Martín	17–25	22–25	25–19	20–25		84–94	

==== Second leg ====
Date		Score		Set 1	Set 2	Set 3	Set 4	Set 5	Total	Report
16 Apr	Regatas Lima	3–1	Géminis	25–17	26–28	25–22	25–15		101–82	
16 Apr	Universidad San Martín	1–3	Alianza Lima	21–25	25–20	20–25	20–25		86–95	

==== Extra game ====
Date		Score		Set 1	Set 2	Set 3	Set 4	Set 5	Total	Report
14 Apr	Alianza Lima	2–3	Universidad San Martín	21–25	24–26	25–23	25–14	13–15	108–103	

== Fifth stage ==
=== Bronze Medal Matches ===
==== First leg ====
Date		Score		Set 1	Set 2	Set 3	Set 4	Set 5	Total	Report
23 Apr	Géminis	3–1	Alianza Lima	21–25	25–20	25–19	26–24		97–88	

==== Second leg ====
Date		Score		Set 1	Set 2	Set 3	Set 4	Set 5	Total	Report
29 Apr	Alianza Lima	2–3	Géminis	25–23	25–22	15–25	23–25	12–15	100–110	

=== Gold Medal Matches ===
==== First leg ====
Date		Score		Set 1	Set 2	Set 3	Set 4	Set 5	Total	Report
23 Apr	Universidad San Martín	0–3	Regatas Lima	13–25	19–25	22–25			54–75	

==== Second leg ====
Date		Score		Set 1	Set 2	Set 3	Set 4	Set 5	Total	Report
29 Apr	Regatas Lima	3–0	Universidad San Martín	27–25	25–21	28–26			80–72	

== Final standing ==
Rank	Team
1st place, gold medalist(s)	Regatas Lima
2nd place, silver medalist(s)	Universidad San Martín
3rd place, bronze medalist(s)	Géminis
4	Alianza Lima
5	Jaamsa
6	Circolo Sportivo Italiano
7	Sporting Cristal
8	Universidad César Vallejo
9	Sport Performance Volleyball
10	Deportivo Alianza
11	Túpac Amaru

Team qualified for the 2019 South American Club Championship
Team lost A1 category

2017–18 Liga Nacional Superior de Voleibol;

Regatas Lima
6th title

== Awards ==
=== Individual awards ===
- Best scorer
  - (Peru) Ángela Leyva (Universidad San Martín)
- Best central
  - (United States) Ashley Benson (Regatas Lima)
- Best outside hitter
  - (Peru) Ángela Leyva (Universidad San Martín)
- Best opposite
  - (United States) Sereea Freeman (Regatas Lima)
- Best setter
  - (Peru) Shiamara Almeida (Alianza Lima)
- Best server
  - (Peru) Angélica Aquino (Regatas Lima)
- Best libero
  - (Peru) Miriam Patiño (Regatas Lima)
