= Liga Peruana de Vóley Femenino =

Club volleyball sports league in peru

Liga Peruana de Vóley Femenino Betsson
- Current season, competition or edition: 2026–27 Liga Peruana de Vóley Femenino
- Sport: Volleyball
- Founded: 1965
- No. of teams: 12
- Country: Peru
- Most recent champion: Alianza Lima (6)
- Most titles: Divino Maestro (12)
- Broadcasters: Latina; Movistar Deportes
- Relegation to: Liga Intermedia de Voleibol
- International cup: Campeonato Sudamericano de Clubes de Voleibol Femenino (women)

The Liga Peruana de Vóley Betsson (Spanish for Betsson Peruvian Volleyball League) is the top level Peruvian volleyball competition and it is organized by the Peruvian Volleyball Confederation. There are both men's and women's competitions. The number of participating clubs has been 12 per division since the 2011–12 season. The team champions qualify for the women's South American Volleyball Club Championship.

== History ==
=== Introduction of Volleyball in Peru ===
In 1911, volleyball was introduced to South America through Peru, following the hiring by the government of President Augusto B. Leguía of American educators Joseph Lockey and Joseph McKnight, who were tasked with implementing an educational reform during a period when football and boxing predominated.

Beyond schools, volleyball quickly became popular in neighborhoods, with matches played between Lima, Callao, and the coastal districts known as Balnearios. In nearly every city across the country, the sport gained particular popularity among women. Newspapers in the capital—especially La Crónica, El Comercio, and La Prensa—frequently covered league activities, particularly those in Lima and the Balnearios, highlighting closely contested matches held at Parque Buenos Aires in Barrios Altos, as well as at the Sport José Gálvez in La Victoria District. In the Balnearios, Club Regatas Lima emerged as a leading institution.

In 1933, the Women’s Volleyball League was established—now known as the Liga Deportiva Distrital de Vóleibol de Lima—which remains the oldest and a precursor to organized volleyball leagues in Peru.

On May 12, 1942, the Peruvian Volleyball Federation was founded to formalize competitions and enable participation in international events. The first elected president was Marcial Ayaipoma Vidalón, accompanied by Víctor Morón (vice president), Raúl Valderrama (treasurer), Ofelia Treneman (secretary), and Aníbal Santibáñez and Antonio Delgado as board members. Due to organizational and representation challenges at the time, early championships often saw limited participation and interest.

=== División Superior Nacional de Voleibol ===
Since 1965, official volleyball tournaments in Peru have been held under the name “DISUNVOL”.

The División Superior Nacional de Voleibol (DISUNVOL) was initially established at the level of Metropolitan Lima and was later restructured on a nationwide basis. The champion team qualified for the South American Women's Volleyball Club Championship. The competition was held until 2002, when it was discontinued due to political issues.

The lower tier of this league was known as the División Superior Regional de Voleibol (DISURVOL), which grouped departmental leagues competing for promotion.

During this period, Divino Maestro stood out with 11 titles between the 1960s and 1970s, while Deportivo Power achieved 10 consecutive titles in the 1980s. This era coincided with the golden age of the Peruvian Women’s National Volleyball Team, which won 12 South American Championship titles (from 1964 to 1993), finished as runner-up at the 1982 World Championship held in Peru, earned the bronze medal at the 1986 World Championship in Czechoslovakia, and secured the silver medal at the 1988 Summer Olympics.

Also noteworthy is the undefeated three-time championship won by Alianza Lima under the management of Carlos Aparicio. The titles in 1990 and 1992 are particularly remembered because several Olympic silver medalists wore the club’s jersey, including Rosa García, Natalia Málaga, Gina Torrealva, and Gabriela Pérez del Solar.

=== Liga Nacional Superior de Voleibol ===
LNSV logo (2002–2024)

Although Peru had volleyball competitions prior to 2004, in that year the Federación Peruana de Voleibol, Peru's Volleyball Confederation, organized the first tournament. The original format was heavily criticized due to poor organization from the sponsors and the teams. However, after Telefónica (now Movistar) decided to sponsor the Liga Nacional and change the format to include more teams and make the tournament more competitive, it grew, even becoming the qualifying tournament for Peruvian volleyball clubs to the South American Volleyball Club Championship. In this edition, the tournament adopts the commercial name Liga Peruana de Vóley Apuesta Total, thanks to the sponsorship of the sports betting company Apuesta Total, whose agreement will be in effect until the end of the season. In terms of television broadcasting, the league will no longer be exclusive to Movistar Deportes4. On November 5, 2024, it was announced that Latina Televisión will be the new official channel, broadcasting 92 matches on open signal and 120 through its digital platforms. However, on November 28, Movistar Deportes confirmed that it will continue to offer live broadcasts on its channels and digital media. This season promises intense emotions with ambitious goals among the participating teams. Alianza Lima will seek its first double championship in the history of the tournament, while Regatas Lima will try to return to the podium and achieve its tenth title. For its part, USMP emerges as a strong contender in the fight for its sixth crown. With these goals at stake, a highly competitive and vibrant edition is expected.

=== Liga Peruana de Vóley ===
Since the 2024–25 season, the tournament has been officially named the “Liga Peruana de Vóley.” The current competition format consists of three stages. In the first stage, all teams compete against each other under a round-robin system, while the bottom four teams play among themselves to avoid relegation. In the second stage, the top eight teams from the first stage face each other again in a round-robin format. In the third stage, knockout brackets are formed according to the teams’ standings from the second stage.

On 24 Oct 2025, the global sports betting and gaming company Betsson was announced as the league's new main partner resulting in the league being branded as the Betsson Peruvian Volleyball League (or Liga Peruana de Vóley Betsson in Spanish).

== Format ==
The original format that was used from 2004 to 2007–08 had 12 teams in two pools of 6, each team played once against the other 5 teams in the pool, after the first round matches were played, the 3 top teams from each pool formed a new final pool where the winner was declared champion while the bottom 3 teams from each pool played against each other as the bottom 2 teams from that round lost the category.

After Telefónica Peru joined the organizing comite, the format changed to include teams from clubs from all states in Peru and not just Lima. The competition had two parts, the Apertura and Clausura.

The Apertura was played first, consisted of a Round-Robyn system between 14 and 16 teams, after all matches are played the top 8 teams will move on while the bottom 6 or 8 teams are eliminated, the bottom 2 teams are at risk of losing the category. The top 8 teams will play the quarterfinals as follows: 1° VS 8°, 2° VS 7°, 3° VS 6° and 4° VS 5°. The winners will play the semifinals with the winning team from the 1° VS 8° match against the winner from the 4° VS 5° match, and the other two winning teams will play the other semifinal. The winners from the semifinals play for the first place while the losers play for the third place.

The Clausura was played a few months later, the top 8 teams will compete again in a Round-Robyn system, the top 4 teams will advance to the second round, in case the winning team from the Apertura finishes in 5th to 8th place, they will still advance to the second round with the top 3 teams. The 4 remaining teams will play against each other again, after each team has played the other 3, the ranking determines the semifinals, 1° VS 4° and 2° VS 3° with the winners from each match competing for the gold medal and the title of Champions of the Season while the losing teams play for the bronze medal.

As of the 2011–12 season, the competition uses the Regular Season formula which is 12 teams play two Round-Robyn tournaments, "Home and Away", the top eight teams after both rounds play the quarterfinals as follows: 1° VS 8°, 2° VS 7°, 3° VS 6° and 4° VS 5°. The winners will play the semifinals with the winning team from the 1° VS 8° match against the winner from the 4° VS 5° match, and the other two winning teams will play the other semifinal. The winners from the semifinals play for the first place while the losers play for the third place.

The winning team from the season qualifies for the Women's South American Volleyball Club Championship.

== List of Champions ==
- (In bracket, title count):

=== División Superior Nacional de Voleibol (DISUNVOL) ===
Ed.	Season	Champion	Runner-up	Third place	Winning manager
División Superior Nacional de Voleibol (DISUNVOL)
1	1965	Divino Maestro (1)			
2	1966	Divino Maestro (2)			
3	1968	Divino Maestro (3)			
4	1970	Divino Maestro (4)			
5	1971	Divino Maestro (5)			
6	1972	Divino Maestro (6)			
7	1973	Divino Maestro (7)			
8	1974	Deportivo Bancoper (1)			
9	1975	Divino Maestro (8)	Deportivo JUCU		
10	1976	Divino Maestro (9)			
11	1977	Divino Maestro (10)			
12	1978	Divino Maestro (11)			
13	1979	Deportivo JUCU (1)			
14	1980				
15	1981				
16	1982^{[1]}	Power	Deportivo Bancoper	Juventus	(Peru) Fernando Aguayo
17	1983^{[2]}	Power	Deportivo Bancoper	—	(Peru) Fernando Aguayo
18	1984^{[3]}	Power	Deportivo Bancoper	—	(Peru) Fernando Aguayo
19	1985^{[4]}	Power	Regatas Lima	—	(Peru) Fernando Aguayo
20	1986^{[5]}	Power	Regatas Lima	Deportivo Bancoper	(Peru) Fernando Aguayo
21	1987^{[6]}	Power	Regatas Lima	Deportivo Bancoper	(Peru) Fernando Aguayo
22	1988^{[7]}	Power	Deportivo Bancoper	—	(Peru) Fernando Aguayo
23	1989	Power	Tejidos La Unión	Regatas Lima	(Peru) Fernando Aguayo
24	1990^{[8]}	Alianza Lima	Regatas Lima	Power	(Peru) Carlos Aparicio
25	1991^{[9]}	Power	Alianza Lima	Banco CCC	(Peru) Fernando Aguayo
26	1992^{[10]}	Alianza Lima	Latino Amisa	Regatas Lima	(Peru) Carlos Aparicio
27	1993^{[11]}	Cristal Bancoper	Alianza Lima	Divino Maestro	(Peru) David Rodas
28	1994^{[12]}	Cristal Bancoper	Sipesa Juventus	Regatas Lima	(Peru) David Rodas
29	1995	Cristal Bancoper	Sipesa Juventus	Divino Maestro	(Peru) David Rodas
30	1996	Regatas Lima	Sipesa Juventus	Alcides Vigo	(Peru) Antonio Carrasco
31	1997–I	Regatas Lima	Deportivo Sipesa	Alcides Vigo	(Peru) Antonio Carrasco
32	1997–II	Deportivo Sipesa	ABC San Felipe	Dapelo	(Peru) Humberto Terrones
33	1998	Deportivo Sipesa	ABC San Felipe	Regatas Lima	(Peru) Humberto Terrones
34	1999	Deportivo Sipesa	ABC San Felipe	Regatas Lima	(Peru) Humberto Terrones
35	2000	Deportivo Wanka	ABC San Felipe	Regatas Lima	(Cuba) Antonio Pérez
36	2001	ABC San Felipe	Regatas Lima	Divino Maestro	(Cuba) Antonio Pérez

=== Liga Peruana de Vóley (LPV) ===
Ed.	Season	Champion	Runner-up	Third place	Winning manager
Liga Nacional Superior de Voleibol (LNSV)
1	2002–03	Regatas Lima	Deportivo Wanka	Géminis	(Peru) Enrique Briceño
2	2003–04	Circolo Sportivo Italiano	Géminis	Regatas Lima	(Peru) Teddy Riera
3	2005	Regatas Lima	Géminis	Circolo Sportivo Italiano	(Peru) Enrique Briceño
4	2005–06	Regatas Lima	Géminis	Divino Maestro	(Peru) Enrique Briceño
5	2006–07	Regatas Lima	Latino Amisa	Camino de Vida	(Peru) Antonio Carrasco
6	2007–08	Géminis	Regatas Lima	Circolo Sportivo Italiano	(Peru) Enrique Briceño
7	2008	Circolo Sportivo Italiano	Géminis	Latino Amisa	(Peru) Teddy Riera
8	2009–10	Géminis	Regatas Lima	Divino Maestro	(Peru) Martín Escudero
9	2010–11	Divino Maestro	Géminis	Universidad César Vallejo	(Peru) Martín Escudero
10	2011–12	Géminis	Universidad San Martín	Divino Maestro	(Peru) Enrique Briceño
11	2012–13	Universidad César Vallejo	Universidad San Martín	Sporting Cristal	(Peru) Natalia Málaga
12	2013–14	Universidad San Martín	Sporting Cristal	Universidad César Vallejo	(Spain) Juan Diego García
13	2014–15	Universidad San Martín	Géminis	Universidad César Vallejo	(Spain) Juan Diego García
14	2015–16	Universidad San Martín	Regatas Lima	Géminis	(Spain) Juan Diego García
15	2016–17	Regatas Lima	Universidad San Martín	Géminis	(Spain) Francisco Hervás
16	2017–18	Universidad San Martín	Jaamsa	Regatas Lima	(Spain) Juan Diego García
17	2018–19	Universidad San Martín	Circolo Sportivo Italiano	Jaamsa	(Peru) Martín Rodríguez
18	2019–20	Abandoned due to the COVID-19 pandemic (See: 2020 Copa Nacional de Vóley)			
19	2020–21	Regatas Lima	Alianza Lima	Circolo Sportivo Italiano	(Argentina) Horacio Bastid
20	2021–22	Regatas Lima	Alianza Lima	Géminis	(Argentina) Horacio Bastid
21	2022–23	Regatas Lima	Alianza Lima	Universidad San Martín	(Argentina) Horacio Bastid
22	2023–24	Alianza Lima	Universidad San Martín	Géminis	(Brazil) Rafael Petry
Liga Peruana de Vóley (LPV)
23	2024–25	Alianza Lima	Regatas Lima	Universidad San Martín	(Argentina) Facundo Morando
24	2025–26	Alianza Lima	Universidad San Martín	Universitario de Deportes	(Argentina) Facundo Morando
25	2026–27				

=== Footnotes ===
1. The tournament ended on March 5, 1983, with Deportivo Power defeating Deportivo Bancoper 3–0 (15–6, 15–7, and 15–7). Deportivo Power qualified for the 1983 Women's South American Volleyball Club Championship.
2. The tournament ended on March 25, 1984, with Deportivo Power defeating Deportivo Bancoper 3–1 (15–4, 10–15, 15–12, and 15–0). Both teams qualified for the 1984 Women's South American Volleyball Club Championship.
3. The tournament concluded on March 31, 1985, with Deportivo Power defeating Deportivo Bancoper 3–0 (15–13, 15–4, and 15–1). Deportivo Power qualified for the 1985 Women's South American Volleyball Club Championship.
4. The tournament concluded on December 22, 1985, with Deportivo Power defeating Regatas Lima 3–2 (11–15, 15–2, 15–10, 12–15, and 15–13). Deportivo Power qualified for the 1986 Women's South American Volleyball Club Championship.
5. The tournament was known as the Torneo de las Estrellas and concluded on February 1, 1987, with Deportivo Power defeating Regatas Lima 3–2 (5–15, 15–5, 15–13, 13–15, and 15–9). Deportivo Power qualified for the 1987 Women's South American Volleyball Club Championship.
6. Both teams qualified for the 1988 Women's South American Volleyball Club Championship.
7. The tournament concluded on December 18, 1988, with Deportivo Power defeating Deportivo Bancoper 3–1 (15–13, 15–11, 9–15, and 15–7). Deportivo Power qualified for the 1989 Women's South American Volleyball Club Championship.
8. The tournament concluded on February 10, 1991, with Alianza Lima defeating Regatas Lima 3–0 (15–10, 15–6, and 16–14). Alianza Lima qualified for the 1991 Women's South American Volleyball Club Championship.
9. The tournament concluded on January 27, 1992, with Deportivo Power defeating Alianza Lima 3–2 ((16–14, 15–12, 6–15, 8–15, and 15–8). Deportivo Power qualified for the 1992 Women's South American Volleyball Club Championship.
10. Alianza Lima was crowned champion of the 1992 season after winning all three short tournaments held: the Torneo Apertura, held in May 1992; the Torneo Clausura, played in July of the same year; and the Liguilla Final, which concluded in January 1993.
11. Cristal Bancoper were crowned national champions in 1993 after defeating Alianza Lima in the final between the winners of the Apertura and Clausura tournaments. The first match, played on 28 March 1994, ended in a 3–0 victory for Cristal Bancoper, with set scores of 15–11, 15–12 and 15–4. In the second match, played on 29 March, Cristal Bancoper defeated Alianza Lima once again, this time by 3–1, with set scores of 15–11, 10–15, 15–8 and 15–8, thereby securing the national title.
12. The Selección y Competencia tournament concluded on 18 December 1994 with Cristal Bancoper defeating Sipesa Juventus 3–0, with set scores of 15–9, 15–11 and 15–8. Both teams qualified for the 1995 Women's South American Volleyball Club Championship.

== Titles by club ==
Rank	Club	Winners	Runners-up	Seasons won	Seasons runner-up
1	Divino Maestro	12	1	1965, 1966, 1968, 1970, 1971, 1972, 1973, 1975, 1976, 1977, 1978, 2010–11	1994
2	Regatas Lima	10	9	1996, 1997–I, 2002–03, 2005, 2005–06, 2006–07, 2016–17, 2020–21, 2021–22, 2022–23	1985, 1986, 1987, 1990, 2001, 2007–08, 2009–10, 2015–16, 2024–25
3	Power	9	—	1982, 1983, 1984, 1985, 1986, 1987, 1988, 1989, 1991	—
4	Alianza Lima^{[D]}	5	5	1990, 1992, 2023–24, 2024–25, 2025–26	1991, 1993, 2020–21, 2021–22, 2022–23
4	Universidad San Martín	5	5	2013–14, 2014–15, 2015–16, 2017–18, 2018–19	2011–12, 2012–13, 2016–17, 2023–24, 2025–26
5	Deportivo Wanka^{[B]}	4	7	1997–II, 1998, 1999, 2000	1994, 1995, 1996, 1997–I, 2002–03, 2017–18
6	Géminis	3	6	2007–08, 2009–10, 2011–12	2003–04, 2005, 2005–06, 2008, 2010–11, 2014–15
6	Cristal Bancoper^{[A]}	3	4	1993, 1994, 1995	1983, 1984, 1985–I, 1988
7	Circolo Sportivo Italiano	2	1	2003–04, 2008	2018–19
8	ABC San Felipe^{[C]}	1	4	2001	1997–II, 1998, 1999, 2000
8	Deportivo JUCU	1	1	1979	1975
8	Universidad César Vallejo	1	—	2012–13	—

=== Footnotes ===
A. Includes titles as "Deportivo Bancoper".
B. Includes titles as "Juventus", "Sipesa Juventus", "Deportivo Sipesa", "Deportivo Pesquero", "Wanka Surco", "Wanka Callao" and "Jaamsa".
C. Includes titles as "ABC Maison de Santé".
D. Includes titles as "Alianza Santa Teresita".

== National cups ==
=== Copa Nacional de Vóley ===
Season	Champion	Score	Runner-up	Third place	Score	Fourth place	Winning manager
2020	Jaamsa	3–2	Alianza Lima	Regatas Lima	3–0	Universidad San Martín	(Cuba) Juan Carlos Gala

== Half-year / Short tournaments ==
Season		Champion	Runner-up	Third place	Fourth place
División Superior Nacional de Voleibol (DISUNVOL)
1991	Octogonal^{[A]}	Alianza Lima	Latino Amisa	Regatas Lima	Power
1992	Apertura^{[B]}	Alianza Lima	Power	Latino Amisa	Banco CCC
1992	Clausura^{[C]}	Alianza Lima	Regatas Lima	Power	Latino Amisa
1992	Liguilla Final^{[D]}	Alianza Lima	Latino Amisa	Power	Regatas Lima
1993	Apertura^{[E]}	Alianza Lima	Cristal Bancoper	Divino Maestro	Juventus
1993	Clausura^{[F]}	Cristal Bancoper	Divino Maestro	Regatas Lima	Alianza Lima
1995	Apertura	Cristal Bancoper	Sipesa Juventus	Divino Maestro	Latino Amisa
1995	Clausura^{[F]}	Cristal Bancoper	Sipesa Juventus	Divino Maestro	Latino Amisa
1997	Apertura	Regatas Lima	Deportivo Sipesa	Alcides Vigo	Peruga Real
1997	Clausura	Deportivo Sipesa	ABC San Felipe	Dapelo	Peruga Real
1998	Apreciación	Deportivo Sipesa			
1999	Apertura	Deportivo Sipesa			
1999	Clausura	Deportivo Sipesa	ABC San Felipe	Regatas Lima	AELU
Liga Nacional Superior de Voleibol (LNSV)
2009–10	Apertura	Regatas Lima	Géminis	Circolo Sportivo Italiano	Latino Amisa
2009–10	Clausura	Regatas Lima	Géminis	Divino Maestro	Circolo Sportivo Italiano
2009–10	Liguilla Final	Géminis	Regatas Lima	Divino Maestro	Circolo Sportivo Italiano
2010–11	Apertura	Divino Maestro	Géminis	Universitario de Deportes	Regatas Lima
2010–11	Clausura	Divino Maestro	Géminis	Deportivo Alianza	Universidad César Vallejo
2010–11	Liguilla Final	Divino Maestro	Géminis	Universidad César Vallejo	Deportivo Alianza

=== Footnotes ===
A. The octagonal tournament, held in honor of Dr. José Pezet Miró Quesada, concluded on June 9, 1991, with Alianza Lima defeating Latino Amisa 3–0, with set scores of 15–8, 15–4, and 15–6.
B. The tournament ended on May 9, 1992, with Alianza Lima defeating Deportivo Power 3–2 (10–15, 15–11, 9–15, 15–11, and 17–16).
C. The tournament ended on July 12, 1992, with Alianza Lima defeating Regatas Lima 3–0 (15–9, 16–14, and 15–13). Alianza Lima qualified for the 1993 Women's South American Volleyball Club Championship.
D. The tournament ended on January 17, 1993, with Alianza Lima defeating Latino Amisa 3–2 (15–17, 10–15, 15–11, 15–7, and 15–8). Alianza Lima had already secured qualification for the 1993 Women's South American Volleyball Club Championship by winning the Torneo Clausura. Meanwhile, Latino Amisa obtained the other berth in the continental tournament after Regatas Lima withdrew from the playoff for the runner-up position, which was to be contested between the runner-up of the Torneo Clausura and the runner-up of the Liguilla Final.
E. The tournament was named Torneo de las Estrellas and ended on July 24, 1993, with Alianza Lima defeating Cristal Bancoper 3–1 (11–15, 15–9, 15–10, and 15–12). Alianza Lima qualified for the 1994 Women's South American Volleyball Club Championship.
F. The tournament was named Torneo de Selección y Competencia and ended on January 23, 1994, with Cristal Bancoper defeating Divino Maestro 3–2 (7–15, 15–12, 7–15, 15–5, and 15–13). Cristal Bancoper qualified for the 1994 Women's South American Volleyball Club Championship.

== Participation in International Competitions ==
=== Medals summary ===
Rank	Nation	Gold	Silver	Bronze	Total
1	Power	5	2	2	9
2	Sipesa Juventus	1	2	1	4
3	Alianza Lima	0	2	2	4
4	Cristal Bancoper	0	2	1	3
5	Regatas Lima	0	1	2	3
5	Universidad San Martín	0	1	2	3
7	Géminis	0	1	0	1
7	Universidad César Vallejo	0	1	0	1
Totals (8 entries)		6	12	10	28

=== Total International Participations by club ===
As of 13 April 2026

Club	Total	International Participations		
Club	Total	FIVB Volleyball Club World Championship (1991–)	Campeonato Sudamericano de Clubes (1970–)	Campeonato Sudamericano de Campeones (1993–1999)
Regatas Lima	10	0	9	1
Power	9	0	9	0
Alianza Lima^{[A]}	7	1	4	2
Universidad San Martín	4	0	4	0
Cristal Bancoper^{[B]}	4	0	2	2
Sipesa Juventus^{[C]}	4	0	0	4
Géminis	2	0	2	0
Latino Amisa	2	0	1	1
(Peru) LNSV^{[D]}	1	0	1	0
Universidad César Vallejo	1	0	1	0

==== Footnotes ====
A. Includes participations as "Alianza Santa Teresita".
B. Includes participations as "Deportivo Bancoper".
C. Includes participations as "Deportivo Wanka", "Deportivo Pesquero", "Wanka Surco", "Wanka Callao" and "Jaamsa".
D. Peru competed in the 2014 tournament with its U-23 national team, which participated under the designation LNSV (Liga Nacional Superior de Voleibol).

== See also ==
- Peru women's national volleyball team
- Peru men's national volleyball team
- Volleyball Copa Latina
- Liga Peruana de Vóley Masculino
