= CV Deportivo Géminis =

Peruvian women's volleyball team

Deportivo Géminis
- Full name: Club Deportivo Cultural Géminis
- Short name: GEM
- Nickname: Las Guerreras (The Warriors)
- Founded: 2002
- Ground: Manuel Bonilla Stadium (Capacity: 3000)
- Chairman: Lincoln Lizano
- Manager: Martín Escudero
- Captain: Sara Joya
- League: Liga Nacional Superior de Voleibol
- Best Finish: Champion (2007, 2009, 2011)

Uniforms
Home	Away

Deportivo Géminis is a women's volleyball club based in Comas, Lima, Peru. The club have won the Liga Nacional Superior de Voleibol title three times.

== Current squad ==
Squad as of the 2016-17 LNSV

Number	Player	Position	Height (m)
1	(Peru) Alexandra Muñoz	Setter	1.83
3	(Peru) Nayeli Vilchez	Setter	1.78
4	(Peru) Patricia Soto	Opposite	1.83
5	(Peru) Vivian Baella	Wing-Spiker	1.77
6	(Brazil) Simone Scherer	Middle-Blocker	1.89
7	(Peru) Sandra del Aguila	Unknown	1.78
9	(Peru) Katherine Regalado	Opposite	1.88
10	(Peru) Nayeli Yabar	Unknown	1.70
11	(Peru) Nicole Linares	Wing-Spiker	1.72
12	(Peru) Claudia Palza	Middle-Blocker	1.79
14	(Peru) Diana de la Peña	Middle-Blocker	1.87
16	(Peru) Andrea Villegas	Libero	1.62
17	(Peru) Maryore Escobar	Unknown	1.75
18	(Peru) Isabella Sanchez	Unknown	1.68
19	(Peru) Milagros Sandoval	Unknown	1.75
20	(Peru) Carla Rueda	Wing-Spiker	1.84
21	(Peru) Kamila Lozada	Unknown	1.69

== Honours ==
=== Peruvian championships (3) ===
- Women's South American Volleyball Club Championship: 0

Runner-up (1): (2010)

- Liga Nacional Superior de Voleibol: 3 (2007–08, 2009–10, 2011–12)

Runner-up (1): (2010-11)
