= CV Universidad César Vallejo =

Peruvian volleyball club

Club Deportivo Universidad César Vallejo
- Full name: Universidad César Vallejo
- Short name: UCV
- Nickname: Las Poetas (The Poets)
- Founded: 2004
- Ground: Coliseo Gran Chimu (Capacity: 8,000)
- Manager: Ernesto Despaigne
- Captain: Keith Meneses
- League: Liga Nacional Superior de Voleibol
- 2012-13: Champions

Uniforms
Home	Away

Universidad César Vallejo is the women's volleyball club based in Trujillo, Peru. The team take its name from the Cesar Vallejo University.

== History ==
=== 2012/13 season ===
The team hired the junior female National Team Natalia Malaga and the international Peruvian players Milagros Moy and Verónica Contreras to play along with Dominicans Marianne Fersola and Sidarka Núñez. The season ended with the club winning the league championship and qualifying for the South American Club Championship. Milagros Moy won the Most Valuable Player award. The club lost to Unilever the first place of the South American Club tournament, settling with the silver medal.

== Current squad ==
Squad as of the 2017-18 LNSV

Number	Player	Position	Height (m)
1	(Peru) Camila Perez	Middle-Blocker	1.79
2	(Peru) Melanny Morales	Setter	1.73
3	(Peru) Thais Rojas	Libero	1.68
4	(Peru) Andrea Ampuero	Wing-Spiker	1.74
5	(Peru) Cielo Matos	Opposite	1.73
6	(Peru) Aixa Vigil	Wing-Spiker	1.87
7	(Peru) Shanaia Ayme	Wing-Spiker	1.80
8	(Peru) Izaboth Bravo	Opposite	1.74
9	(Peru) Antonela Vizurraga	Wing-Spiker	1.69
10	(Peru) Sandra Chumacero	Middle-Blocker	1.77
11	(Peru) Tamara Chavez	Middle-Blocker	1.80
12	(Peru) Hanna Lavi	Wing-Spiker	1.74
13	(Peru) Kamila Muñoz	Setter	1.80
14	(Peru) Rommy Portocarrero	Defensive-Player	1.69
15	(Cuba) Laura Suarez	Middle-Blocker	1.85
16	(Cuba) Daymara Lescay	Opposite	1.84
17	(Peru) Geissa Flores	Setter	1.66
18	(Peru) Valeria Takeda	Libero	1.65
19	(Peru) Keith Meneses	Wing-Spiker	1.78
20	(Peru) Reyna Orellana	Opposite	1.77
21	(Peru) Ariagna Linares	Wing-Spiker	1.78

== Technical and managerial staff ==
The club is managed by Kelly Acuña. daughter of the manager for the soccer club of the same name, César Acuña.

Squad as of December, 2012

Name	Job
(Peru) Kelly Acuña	Team manager
(Peru) Natalia Málaga	Head coach
(Peru) Gaspar Vicuña	Assistant coach
(Peru) Danny Fiestas	Physiotherapist
(Peru) Marco Ramírez	Trainer

== Women’s volleyball ==
=== National ===
- Liga Nacional Superior de Voleibol:

Winners (1): 2012–13

=== International ===
- Women's South American Volleyball Club Championship:

Runner-up (1): 2013
