= Peruvian Volleyball Federation =

Governing body of volleyball in Peru

- Federación Peruana de Voleibol
- Formation: 1942
- Type: National Federation
- Headquarters: Lima
- Location: Jesús María District
- Members: FIVB; CSV; PASO; ODEBO
- Official language: Spanish
- President: Lic. Luis Linares
- Key people: Mr. Mam-Bok Park
- Website: www.fpv.com.pe

The Peruvian Volleyball Federation (Spanish: Federación Peruana de Voleibol, FPV) is the governing body of volleyball and beach volleyball in Peru. Formed February 24th, 1942, its headquarters are in the capital city of Lima. The FPV is a member of the International Volleyball Federation (FIVB) and the South American Volleyball Confederation (CSV) and it is affiliated to the Instituto Peruano del Deporte IPD (Spanish for Peruvian Sports Institute) and the Peruvian Olympic Committee.

It organizes both the men's and women's Liga Nacional Superior de Voleibol (Spanish for Senior National Volleyball League), which are the top level's volleyball competition in Peru. It also organizes international cups which are registered at the FIVB such as the Copa Latina. The organization also administrates the Peru men's national volleyball team and the Peru women's national volleyball team.
