= 2026–27 Liga Peruana de Vóley Femenino =

Liga Peruana de Vóley Femenino
- Association: FPV
- League: Liga Peruana de Vóley Femenino
- Sport: Volleyball
- Duration: October 17, 2026 to May, 2027
- Teams: 11

Seasons
- ← 2024–25 2027–28 →

The 2026–27 Liga Peruana de Voley Femenino (Spanish for: 2026–27 Peruvian Women's Volleyball League) or 2026–27 LPV is be the 25th official season of the Peruvian Volleyball League. The 2026–27 Liga Peruana de Vóley will feature a video challenge system starting from First stage, as the FPV will acquire its own technology for the implementation of the system.

Alianza Lima are the defending champions after winning three consecutive titles in the 2023–24, 2024–25, and 2025–26 seasons.

== Teams ==
=== Team changes ===
Invited	Relegated from 2025–26 LPV
▲ Equipo Perú	▼ Kazoku No Perú (12th)

=== Competing Teams ===
Club	Manager
Alianza Lima	(Argentina) Alejandro Schneider
Atlético Atenea	(Argentina) Lorena Góngora
Circolo Sportivo Italiano	(Argentina) Marcos Blanco
Deportivo Soan	(Brazil) Vinícius Fernandes
Deportivo Wanka	(Peru) Heinz Garro
Equipo Perú	(Brazil) Marcello Bencardino
Géminis	(Peru) Natalia Málaga
Olva Latino	(Peru) César Arrese
Rebaza Acosta	(Peru) Martín Rodríguez
Regatas Lima	(Argentina) Horacio Bastit
Universidad San Martín	(Argentina) Martín Ambrosini
Universitario	(Spain) Francisco Hervás

== First stage ==
The first round is a Round-Robin system where all 12 teams will play once against the other 11.

Pool standing procedure

1. Numbers of matches won
2. Match points
3. Sets ratio
4. Points ratio

Match won 3–0 or 3–1: 3 match points for the winner, 0 match points for the loser
Match won 3–2: 2 match points for the winner, 1 match point for the loser

Ranking

Pos	Team	Pld	W	L	Pts	SPW	SPL	SPR	SW	SL	SR	Qualification
1	Universidad San Martín	6	6	0	18	494	361	1.368	18	2	9.000	Second stage
2	Alianza Lima	6	5	1	14	548	415	1.320	16	7	2.286	Second stage
3	Universitario	6	4	2	12	411	348	1.181	12	6	2.000	Second stage
4	Regatas Lima	6	4	2	12	383	375	1.021	13	6	2.167	Second stage
5	Atlético Atenea	5	3	2	10	432	403	1.072	12	7	1.714	Second stage
6	Deportivo Soan	6	3	3	9	452	454	0.996	10	11	0.909	Second stage
7	Rebaza Acosta	6	3	3	9	481	465	1.034	11	11	1.000	Second stage
8	Circolo Sportivo Italiano	6	3	3	8	441	458	0.963	10	11	0.909	Second stage
9	Géminis	6	2	4	7	492	494	0.996	9	13	0.692	Second stage
10	Olva Latino	6	2	4	6	367	431	0.852	7	12	0.583	Second stage
11	Deportivo Wanka	7	1	6	3	406	508	0.799	4	18	0.222	Relegation to 2027–28 LNIV
12	Equipo Perú	6	0	6	0	266	451	0.590	0	18	0.000	

=== Results ===
==== Round 1 ====
Date	Time		Score		Set 1	Set 2	Set 3	Set 4	Set 5	Total	Report
17 Oct	14:45	Atlético Atenea	3–0	Olva Latino	25–16	25–19	25–18			75–53	
17 Oct	17:00	Universitario	3–0	Deportivo Soan	25–13	25–17	25–19			75–49	
17 Oct	19:00	Universidad San Martín	3–0	Circolo Sportivo Italiano	25–18	25–10	25–19			75–47	
18 Oct	14:15	Equipo Perú	0–3	Deportivo Wanka	10–25	9–25	20–25			39–75	
18 Oct	16:30	Regatas Lima	3–0	Géminis	25–23	25–20	25–16			75–59	
18 Oct	18:30	Rebaza Acosta	2–3	Alianza Lima	22–25	25–22	25–17	22–25	13–25	107–114	

==== Round 2 ====
Date	Time		Score		Set 1	Set 2	Set 3	Set 4	Set 5	Total	Report
24 Oct	14:45	Equipo Perú	0–3	Olva Latino	14–25	24–26	11–25			49–76	
24 Oct	17:00	Rebaza Acosta	3–2	Atlético Atenea	21–25	25–17	25–23	22–25	15–13	108–103	
24 Oct	19:00	Regatas Lima	0–3*	Alianza Lima	0–25	0–25	0–25			0–75	
25 Oct	14:15	Universidad San Martín	3–1	Deportivo Soan	25–13	23–25	25–21	25–18		98–77	
25 Oct	16:30	Circolo Sportivo Italiano	3–2	Géminis	25–23	25–23	22–25	19–25	15–13	106–109	
25 Oct	18:30	Universitario	3–0	Deportivo Wanka	25–16	25–14	25–18			75–48	

* Originally, Alianza Lima defeated Regatas Lima 3–2 in sets (25-16, 22-25, 21-25, 25-18, 8-15). However, due to an improper lineup, as they had four foreign players on the court, Regatas Lima was ruled to have forfeited the match, and the result was officially recorded as a 3–0 victory in favor of Alianza Lima.

==== Round 3 ====
Date	Time		Score		Set 1	Set 2	Set 3	Set 4	Set 5	Total	Report
31 Oct	14:45	Deportivo Soan	3–1	Deportivo Wanka	19–25	25–16	25–16	25–17		94–74	
31 Oct	17:00	Universidad San Martín	3–0	Géminis	28–26	25–11	25–18			78–55	
31 Oct	19:00	Universitario	3–0	Olva Latino	25–13	25–17	25–13			75–43	
1 Nov	14:15	Equipo Perú	0–3	Rebaza Acosta	15–25	19–25	19–25			53–75	
1 Nov	16:30	Regatas Lima	1–3	Atlético Atenea	25–13	21–25	22–25	15–25		83–88	
1 Nov	18:30	Circolo Sportivo Italiano	1–3	Alianza Lima	25–20	18–25	15–25	20–25		78–95	

==== Round 4 ====
Date	Time		Score		Set 1	Set 2	Set 3	Set 4	Set 5	Total	Report
7 Nov	14:45	Deportivo Soan	3–1	Olva Latino	25–19	25–17	19–25	25–13		94–74	
7 Nov	17:00	Universidad San Martín	3–0	Deportivo Wanka	25–20	25–19	25–10			75–49	
7 Nov	19:00	Universitario	3–0	Rebaza Acosta	25–18	25–18	25–22			75–58	
8 Nov	14:15	Regatas Lima	3–0	Equipo Perú	25–10	25–16	25–13			75–39	
8 Nov	16:30	Circolo Sportivo Italiano	0–3	Atlético Atenea	23–25	21–25	16–25			60–75	
8 Nov	18:30	Géminis	1–3	Alianza Lima	26–24	20–25	23–25	26–28		95–102	

==== Round 5 ====
Date	Time		Score		Set 1	Set 2	Set 3	Set 4	Set 5	Total	Report
14 Nov	14:45	Circolo Sportivo Italiano	3–0	Equipo Perú	25–12	25–13	25–19			75–44	
14 Nov	17:00	Deportivo Wanka	0–3	Olva Latino	22–25	20–25	21–25			63–75	
14 Nov	19:00	Universidad San Martín	3–1	Alianza Lima	25–19	25–21	18–25	25–22		93–87	
15 Nov	14:15	Géminis	3–1	Atlético Atenea	25–22	23–25	26–24	25–20		99–91	
15 Nov	16:30	Deportivo Soan	3–0	Rebaza Acosta	25–22	25–16	25–20			75–58	
15 Nov	18:30	Universitario	0–3	Regatas Lima	19–25	13–25	19–25			51–75	

==== Round 6 ====
Date	Time		Score		Set 1	Set 2	Set 3	Set 4	Set 5	Total	Report
21 Nov	14:45	Deportivo Wanka	0–3	Rebaza Acosta	20–25	22–25	13–25			55–75	
21 Nov	17:00	Deportivo Soan	0–3	Regatas Lima	17–25	23–25	23–25			63–75	
21 Nov	19:00	Circolo Sportivo Italiano	3–0	Universitario	25–18	25–22	25–20			75–60	
22 Nov	14:15	Géminis	3–0	Equipo Perú	25–12	25–13	25–17			75–42	
22 Nov	16:30	Universidad San Martín	3–0	Olva Latino	25–18	25–9	25–19			75–46	
22 Nov	18:30	Alianza Lima	–	Atlético Atenea	–	–	–	–	–	0–0	–

==== Round 7 ====
Date	Time		Score		Set 1	Set 2	Set 3	Set 4	Set 5	Total	Report
28 Nov	14:45	Olva Latino	–	Rebaza Acosta	–	–	–	–	–	0–0	–
28 Nov	17:00	Alianza Lima	–	Equipo Perú	–	–	–	–	–	0–0	–
28 Nov	19:00	Universidad San Martín	–	Atlético Atenea	–	–	–	–	–	0–0	–
29 Nov	14:15	Deportivo Wanka	–	Regatas Lima	–	–	–	–	–	0–0	–
29 Nov	16:30	Deportivo Soan	–	Circolo Sportivo Italiano	–	–	–	–	–	0–0	–
29 Nov	18:30	Géminis	–	Universitario	–	–	–	–	–	0–0	–

==== Round 8 ====
Date	Time		Score		Set 1	Set 2	Set 3	Set 4	Set 5	Total	Report
5 Dec	14:45	Atlético Atenea	–	Equipo Perú	–	–	–	–	–	0–0	–
5 Dec	17:00	Deportivo Wanka	–	Circolo Sportivo Italiano	–	–	–	–	–	0–0	–
5 Dec	19:00	Alianza Lima	–	Universitario	–	–	–	–	–	0–0	–
6 Dec	14:15	Géminis	–	Deportivo Soan	–	–	–	–	–	0–0	–
6 Dec	16:30	Olva Latino	–	Regatas Lima	–	–	–	–	–	0–0	–
6 Dec	18:30	Universidad San Martín	–	Rebaza Acosta	–	–	–	–	–	0–0	–

==== Round 9 ====
Date	Time		Score		Set 1	Set 2	Set 3	Set 4	Set 5	Total	Report
2 Dec	15:30	Universidad San Martín	–	Equipo Perú	–	–	–	–	–	0–0	–
2 Dec	17:30	Atlético Atenea	–	Universitario	–	–	–	–	–	0–0	–
9 Dec	15:30	Olva Latino	–	Circolo Sportivo Italiano	–	–	–	–	–	0–0	–
9 Dec	17:30	Rebaza Acosta	–	Regatas Lima	–	–	–	–	–	0–0	–
16 Dec	15:30	Deportivo Wanka	–	Géminis	–	–	–	–	–	0–0	–
16 Dec	17:30	Alianza Lima	–	Deportivo Soan	–	–	–	–	–	0–0	–

==== Round 10 ====
Date	Time		Score		Set 1	Set 2	Set 3	Set 4	Set 5	Total	Report
18 Nov	17:30	Alianza Lima	3–0	Deportivo Wanka	25–19	25–10	25–13			75–42	
12 Dec	14:45	Atlético Atenea	–	Deportivo Soan	–	–	–	–	–	0–0	–
12 Dec	17:00	Equipo Perú	–	Universitario	–	–	–	–	–	0–0	–
12 Dec	19:00	Rebaza Acosta	–	Circolo Sportivo Italiano	–	–	–	–	–	0–0	–
13 Dec	14:15	Olva Latino	–	Géminis	–	–	–	–	–	0–0	–
13 Dec	16:30	Universidad San Martín	–	Regatas Lima	–	–	–	–	–	0–0	–

==== Round 11 ====
Date	Time		Score		Set 1	Set 2	Set 3	Set 4	Set 5	Total	Report
19 Dec	14:45	Atlético Atenea	–	Deportivo Wanka	–	–	–	–	–	0–0	–
19 Dec	17:00	Regatas Lima	–	Circolo Sportivo Italiano	–	–	–	–	–	0–0	–
19 Dec	19:00	Universidad San Martín	–	Universitario	–	–	–	–	–	0–0	–
20 Dec	14:15	Equipo Perú	–	Deportivo Soan	–	–	–	–	–	0–0	–
20 Dec	16:30	Rebaza Acosta	–	Géminis	–	–	–	–	–	0–0	–
20 Dec	18:30	Olva Latino	–	Alianza Lima	–	–	–	–	–	0–0	–

== See also ==
- 2027 Women's South American Volleyball Club Championship
