= 2025–26 Liga Peruana de Vóley Femenino =

Liga Peruana de Vóley Femenino
- Association: FPV
- League: Liga Peruana de Vóley Femenino
- Sport: Volleyball
- Duration: October 25, 2025 to May 3, 2026
- Games: 135
- Teams: 12
- Relegated: Kazoku No Perú
- Finals champions: Alianza Lima (6th title)
- Runners-up: Universidad San Martín

Seasons
- ← 2024–25 2026–27 →

The 2025–26 Liga Peruana de Voley Femenino (Spanish for: 2025–26 Peruvian Women's Volleyball League) or 2025–26 LPV was the 24th official season of the Peruvian Volleyball League.

Alianza Lima were the defending champions, having won back-to-back titles in the 2023–24 and 2024–25 seasons.

On May 3, Alianza Lima were crowned three-time champions after defeating Universidad San Martín in a thrilling extra game, winning 3 sets to 2.

== Teams ==
=== Team changes ===
| Promoted from 2024–25 LNIV | Relegated from 2024–25 LPV |
|---|---|
| ▲ Kazoku No Perú (1st) | ▼ Túpac Amaru (12th) |

=== Competing Teams ===
| Club | Manager |
|---|---|
| Alianza Lima | (Argentina) Facundo Morando |
| Atlético Atenea | (Argentina) Lorena Góngora |
| Circolo Sportivo Italiano | (Argentina) Marcos Blanco |
| Deportivo Soan | (Argentina) Mauro Boasso |
| Deportivo Wanka | (Peru) Martín Rodríguez |
| Géminis | (Brazil) Otávio Machado (First Stage: Round 1–2) (Peru) Natalia Málaga |
| Kazoku No Perú | (Peru) Arturo Gambini |
| Olva Latino | (Peru) Walter Lung |
| Rebaza Acosta | (Peru) Roy Mauricio |
| Regatas Lima | (Argentina) Horacio Bastit |
| Universidad San Martín | (Brazil) Guilherme Schmitz |
| Universitario | (Spain) Francisco Hervás |

== First stage ==
The first round is a Round-Robin system where all 12 teams will play once against the other 11.

Pool standing procedure

1. Numbers of matches won
2. Match points
3. Sets ratio
4. Points ratio

Match won 3–0 or 3–1: 3 match points for the winner, 0 match points for the loser
Match won 3–2: 2 match points for the winner, 1 match point for the loser

Ranking

| Pos | Team | Pld | W | L | Pts | SPW | SPL | SPR | SW | SL | SR | Qualification |
|---|---|---|---|---|---|---|---|---|---|---|---|---|
| 1 | Universitario | 11 | 10 | 1 | 30 | 907 | 685 | 1.324 | 32 | 7 | 4.571 | Second stage |
| 2 | Universidad San Martín | 11 | 10 | 1 | 29 | 1060 | 886 | 1.196 | 32 | 13 | 2.462 | Second stage |
| 3 | Alianza Lima | 11 | 9 | 2 | 27 | 830 | 699 | 1.187 | 28 | 9 | 3.111 | Second stage |
| 4 | Circolo Sportivo Italiano | 11 | 6 | 5 | 18 | 948 | 948 | 1.000 | 23 | 22 | 1.045 | Second stage |
| 5 | Géminis | 11 | 6 | 5 | 17 | 909 | 923 | 0.985 | 22 | 19 | 1.158 | Second stage |
| 6 | Atlético Atenea | 11 | 6 | 5 | 17 | 946 | 960 | 0.985 | 22 | 22 | 1.000 | Second stage |
| 7 | Regatas Lima | 11 | 6 | 5 | 16 | 935 | 888 | 1.053 | 23 | 19 | 1.211 | Second stage |
| 8 | Rebaza Acosta | 11 | 4 | 7 | 13 | 936 | 957 | 0.978 | 19 | 25 | 0.760 | Second stage |
| 9 | Olva Latino | 11 | 4 | 7 | 9 | 871 | 959 | 0.908 | 15 | 27 | 0.556 | Second stage |
| 10 | Deportivo Soan | 11 | 2 | 9 | 10 | 859 | 974 | 0.882 | 16 | 27 | 0.593 | Second stage |
| 11 | Kazoku No Perú | 11 | 2 | 9 | 8 | 790 | 936 | 0.844 | 12 | 29 | 0.414 | Cuadrangular por la permanencia |
| 12 | Deportivo Wanka | 11 | 1 | 10 | 4 | 718 | 894 | 0.803 | 6 | 31 | 0.194 | Cuadrangular por la permanencia |

=== Results ===
==== Round 1 ====
| Date | | Score | | Set 1 | Set 2 | Set 3 | Set 4 | Set 5 | Total | Report |
|---|---|---|---|---|---|---|---|---|---|---|
| 25 Oct | Deportivo Soan | 2–3 | Rebaza Acosta | 25–22 | 16–25 | 25–14 | 23–25 | 9–15 | 98–101 | |
| 25 Oct | Universidad San Martín | 3–1 | Olva Latino | 22–25 | 25–9 | 25–22 | 25–16 | | 97–72 | |
| 25 Oct | Universitario | 3–1 | Géminis | 17–25 | 25–19 | 25–15 | 25–23 | | 92–82 | |
| 26 Oct | Regatas Lima | 3–0 | Deportivo Wanka | 25–10 | 25–20 | 25–22 | | | 75–52 | |
| 26 Oct | Alianza Lima | 3–0 | Kazoku No Perú | 25–16 | 25–12 | 25–11 | | | 75–39 | |
| 26 Oct | Circolo Sportivo Italiano | 1–3 | Atlético Atenea | 26–28 | 25–20 | 21–25 | 19–25 | | 91–98 | |

==== Round 2 ====
| Date | | Score | | Set 1 | Set 2 | Set 3 | Set 4 | Set 5 | Total | Report |
|---|---|---|---|---|---|---|---|---|---|---|
| 1 Nov | Kazoku No Perú | 2–3 | Olva Latino | 25–17 | 23–25 | 20–25 | 32–30 | 14–16 | 114–113 | |
| 1 Nov | Universidad San Martín | 3–1 | Rebaza Acosta | 25–11 | 25–23 | 26–28 | 25–23 | | 101–85 | |
| 1 Nov | Alianza Lima | 3–0 | Deportivo Wanka | 25–12 | 25–15 | 25–16 | | | 75–43 | |
| 2 Nov | Deportivo Soan | 1–3 | Circolo Sportivo Italiano | 25–23 | 22–25 | 18–25 | 9–25 | | 74–98 | |
| 2 Nov | Regatas Lima | 1–3 | Géminis | 22–25 | 25–19 | 22–25 | 17–25 | | 86–94 | |
| 2 Nov | Universitario | 3–0 | Atlético Atenea | 25–22 | 25–22 | 25–18 | | | 75–62 | |

==== Round 3 ====
| Date | | Score | | Set 1 | Set 2 | Set 3 | Set 4 | Set 5 | Total | Report |
|---|---|---|---|---|---|---|---|---|---|---|
| 8 Nov | Kazoku No Perú | 0–3 | Rebaza Acosta | 16–25 | 22–25 | 8–25 | | | 46–75 | |
| 8 Nov | Universidad San Martín | 3–0 | Circolo Sportivo Italiano | 25–12 | 25–19 | 25–22 | | | 75–53 | |
| 8 Nov | Universitario | 3–0 | Deportivo Soan | 25–14 | 25–20 | 25–14 | | | 75–48 | |
| 9 Nov | Deportivo Wanka | 0–3 | Géminis | 19–25 | 24–26 | 14–25 | | | 57–76 | |
| 9 Nov | Regatas Lima | 1–3 | Atlético Atenea | 20–25 | 22–25 | 25–20 | 23–25 | | 90–95 | |
| 9 Nov | Alianza Lima | 3–1 | Olva Latino | 25–15 | 20–25 | 25–17 | 27–25 | | 97–82 | |

==== Round 4 ====
| Date | | Score | | Set 1 | Set 2 | Set 3 | Set 4 | Set 5 | Total | Report |
|---|---|---|---|---|---|---|---|---|---|---|
| 15 Nov | Deportivo Wanka | 3–1 | Atlético Atenea | 23–25 | 25–21 | 25–21 | 25–15 | | 98–82 | |
| 15 Nov | Olva Latino | 3–2 | Rebaza Acosta | 19–25 | 20–25 | 25–15 | 25–16 | 15–10 | 104–91 | |
| 15 Nov | Universidad San Martín | 3–2 | Universitario | 22–25 | 20–25 | 25–22 | 25–12 | 15–7 | 107–91 | |
| 16 Nov | Kazoku No Perú | 0–3 | Circolo Sportivo Italiano | 20–25 | 16–25 | 22–25 | | | 58–75 | |
| 16 Nov | Regatas Lima | 3–0 | Deportivo Soan | 25–13 | 25–15 | 25–19 | | | 75–47 | |
| 16 Nov | Alianza Lima | 3–0 | Géminis | 25–19 | 25–16 | 27–25 | | | 77–60 | |

==== Round 5 ====
| Date | | Score | | Set 1 | Set 2 | Set 3 | Set 4 | Set 5 | Total | Report |
|---|---|---|---|---|---|---|---|---|---|---|
| 22 Nov | Olva Latino | 3–2 | Circolo Sportivo Italiano | 15–25 | 28–26 | 25–17 | 17–25 | 15–13 | 100–106 | |
| 22 Nov | Géminis | 1–3 | Atlético Atenea | 25–20 | 19–25 | 18–25 | 18–25 | | 80–95 | |
| 22 Nov | Rebaza Acosta | 0–3 | Alianza Lima | 19–25 | 20–25 | 19–25 | | | 58–75 | |
| 23 Nov | Deportivo Wanka | 0–3 | Deportivo Soan | 28–30 | 21–25 | 22–25 | | | 71–80 | |
| 23 Nov | Kazoku No Perú | 0–3 | Universitario | 19–25 | 16–25 | 14–25 | | | 49–75 | |
| 23 Nov | Universidad San Martín | 2–3 | Regatas Lima | 25–20 | 25–20 | 21–25 | 16–25 | 16–18 | 103–108 | |

==== Round 6 ====
| Date | | Score | | Set 1 | Set 2 | Set 3 | Set 4 | Set 5 | Total | Report |
|---|---|---|---|---|---|---|---|---|---|---|
| 29 Nov | Kazoku No Perú | 0–3 | Regatas Lima | 18–25 | 7–25 | 21–25 | | | 46–75 | |
| 29 Nov | Géminis | 3–2 | Deportivo Soan | 29–31 | 15–25 | 25–18 | 26–24 | 15–12 | 110–110 | |
| 29 Nov | Olva Latino | 0–3 | Universitario | 18–25 | 25–27 | 22–25 | | | 65–77 | |
| 30 Nov | Rebaza Acosta | 2–3 | Circolo Sportivo Italiano | 29–27 | 25–16 | 22–25 | 20–25 | 9–15 | 105–108 | |
| 30 Nov | Deportivo Wanka | 1–3 | Universidad San Martín | 27–25 | 12–25 | 21–25 | 17–25 | | 77–100 | |
| 30 Nov | Alianza Lima | 3–0 | Atlético Atenea | 25–18 | 25–15 | 25–14 | | | 75–47 | |

==== Round 7 ====
| Date | | Score | | Set 1 | Set 2 | Set 3 | Set 4 | Set 5 | Total | Report |
|---|---|---|---|---|---|---|---|---|---|---|
| 12 Nov | Alianza Lima | 3–0 | Circolo Sportivo Italiano | 25–17 | 25–15 | 25–17 | | | 75–49 | |
| 6 Dec | Atlético Atenea | 3–2 | Deportivo Soan | 25–19 | 21–25 | 20–25 | 25–21 | 15–12 | 106–102 | |
| 6 Dec | Olva Latino | 0–3 | Regatas Lima | 20–25 | 21–25 | 22–25 | | | 63–75 | |
| 6 Dec | Géminis | 1–3 | Universidad San Martín | 15–25 | 24–26 | 25–23 | 18–25 | | 82–99 | |
| 7 Dec | Deportivo Wanka | 0–3 | Kazoku No Perú | 17–25 | 17–25 | 23–25 | | | 57–75 | |
| 7 Dec | Rebaza Acosta | 0–3 | Universitario | 23–25 | 19–25 | 21–25 | | | 63–75 | |

==== Round 8 ====
| Date | | Score | | Set 1 | Set 2 | Set 3 | Set 4 | Set 5 | Total | Report |
|---|---|---|---|---|---|---|---|---|---|---|
| 19 Nov | Alianza Lima | 3–1 | Deportivo Soan | 25–18 | 21–25 | 25–19 | 25–13 | | 96–75 | |
| 13 Dec | Géminis | 3–0 | Kazoku No Perú | 25–19 | 25–18 | 25–23 | | | 75–60 | |
| 13 Dec | Olva Latino | 3–0 | Deportivo Wanka | 25–17 | 25–17 | 25–20 | | | 75–54 | |
| 13 Dec | Atlético Atenea | 1–3 | Universidad San Martín | 17–25 | 25–23 | 12–25 | 19–25 | | 73–98 | |
| 14 Dec | Rebaza Acosta | 2–3 | Regatas Lima | 21–25 | 25–16 | 25–20 | 23–25 | 10–15 | 104–101 | |
| 14 Dec | Circolo Sportivo Italiano | 2–3 | Universitario | 7–25 | 25–17 | 10–25 | 25–22 | 9–15 | 76–104 | |

==== Round 9 ====
| Date | | Score | | Set 1 | Set 2 | Set 3 | Set 4 | Set 5 | Total | Report |
|---|---|---|---|---|---|---|---|---|---|---|
| 20 Dec | Géminis | 3–1 | Olva Latino | 25–16 | 23–25 | 25–22 | 25–23 | | 98–86 | |
| 20 Dec | Deportivo Soan | 0–3 | Universidad San Martín | 16–25 | 16–25 | 19–25 | | | 51–75 | |
| 20 Dec | Circolo Sportivo Italiano | 3–1 | Regatas Lima | 25–22 | 25–19 | 18–25 | 25–21 | | 93–87 | |
| 21 Dec | Rebaza Acosta | 3–0 | Deportivo Wanka | 25–20 | 25–23 | 25–18 | | | 75–61 | |
| 21 Dec | Atlético Atenea | 3–2 | Kazoku No Perú | 25–15 | 22–25 | 25–19 | 21–25 | 15–6 | 108–90 | |
| 21 Dec | Alianza Lima | 0–3* | Universitario | 0–25 | 0–25 | 0–25 | | | 0–75 | |

* Originally, Alianza Lima defeated Universitario 3–0 in sets (25–23, 25–17, 25–15). However, due to an improper lineup, as they had four foreign players on the court, Alianza Lima was ruled to have forfeited the match, and the result was officially recorded as a 3–0 victory in favor of Universitario.

==== Round 10 ====
| Date | | Score | | Set 1 | Set 2 | Set 3 | Set 4 | Set 5 | Total | Report |
|---|---|---|---|---|---|---|---|---|---|---|
| 27 Dec | Deportivo Soan | 2–3 | Kazoku No Perú | 25–18 | 20–25 | 25–23 | 19–25 | 10–15 | 99–106 | |
| 27 Dec | Atlético Atenea | 3–0 | Olva Latino | 25–18 | 25–17 | 25–15 | | | 75–50 | |
| 27 Dec | Alianza Lima | 1–3 | Universidad San Martín | 19–25 | 19–25 | 25–20 | 24–26 | | 87–96 | |
| 28 Dec | Circolo Sportivo Italiano | 3–2 | Deportivo Wanka | 25–21 | 19–25 | 22–25 | 25–23 | 15–9 | 106–103 | |
| 28 Dec | Rebaza Acosta | 0–3 | Géminis | 16–25 | 21–25 | 31–33 | | | 68–83 | |
| 28 Dec | Universitario | 3–1 | Regatas Lima | 25–20 | 25–20 | 18–25 | 25–23 | | 93–88 | |

==== Round 11 ====
| Date | | Score | | Set 1 | Set 2 | Set 3 | Set 4 | Set 5 | Total | Report |
|---|---|---|---|---|---|---|---|---|---|---|
| 3 Jan | Universidad San Martín | 3–2 | Kazoku No Perú | 22–25 | 25–20 | 21–25 | 25–23 | 16–14 | 109–107 | |
| 3 Jan | Circolo Sportivo Italiano | 3–1 | Géminis | 25–11 | 18–25 | 25–17 | 25–16 | | 93–69 | |
| 3 Jan | Universitario | 3–0 | Deportivo Wanka | 25–14 | 25–11 | 25–20 | | | 75–45 | |
| 4 Jan | Deportivo Soan | 3–0 | Olva Latino | 25–21 | 25–20 | 25–20 | | | 75–61 | |
| 4 Jan | Atlético Atenea | 2–3 | Rebaza Acosta | 19–25 | 22–25 | 26–24 | 25–22 | 13–15 | 105–111 | |
| 4 Jan | Alianza Lima | 3–1 | Regatas Lima | 25–14 | 23–25 | 25–21 | 25–15 | | 98–75 | |

== Cuadrangular por la permanencia ==
The clubs finishing in 11th and 12th place will take part in a Permanence/Promotion Quadrangular, together with the teams that finish 1st and 2nd in the 2025–26 Liga Nacional Intermedia de Vóley Femenino. The quadrangular will be played in a single round-robin format. At the end of the quadrangular, the team that finishes in first place will earn the right to compete in the 2026–27 Liga Peruana de Vóley Femenino, which will be contested by 11 teams. The remaining teams in the quadrangular will compete in the 2026–27 Liga Nacional Intermedia de Vóley Femenino.

Ranking

| Pos | Team | Pld | W | L | Pts | SPW | SPL | SPR | SW | SL | SR | Qualification |
|---|---|---|---|---|---|---|---|---|---|---|---|---|
| 1 | Deportivo Wanka | 3 | 3 | 0 | 8 | 278 | 218 | 1.275 | 9 | 3 | 3.000 | |
| 2 | Kazoku No Perú | 3 | 2 | 1 | 7 | 249 | 204 | 1.221 | 8 | 3 | 2.667 | Relegation to 2026–27 LNIV |
| 3 | Túpac Amaru | 3 | 1 | 2 | 3 | 190 | 214 | 0.888 | 4 | 6 | 0.667 | Relegation to 2026–27 LNIV |
| 4 | Molivoleibol | 3 | 0 | 3 | 0 | 144 | 225 | 0.640 | 0 | 9 | 0.000 | Relegation to 2026–27 LNIV |

=== Results ===
==== Round 1 ====
| Date | | Score | | Set 1 | Set 2 | Set 3 | Set 4 | Set 5 | Total | Report |
|---|---|---|---|---|---|---|---|---|---|---|
| 17 Jan | Kazoku No Perú | 3–0 | Molivoleibol | 25–18 | 25–16 | 25–22 | | | 75–56 | |
| 18 Jan | Deportivo Wanka | 3–1 | Túpac Amaru | 23–25 | 25–18 | 25–17 | 25–12 | | 98–72 | |

==== Round 2 ====
| Date | | Score | | Set 1 | Set 2 | Set 3 | Set 4 | Set 5 | Total | Report |
|---|---|---|---|---|---|---|---|---|---|---|
| 21 Jan | Deportivo Wanka | 3–0 | Molivoleibol | 25–20 | 25–8 | 25–19 | | | 75–47 | |
| 21 Jan | Kazoku No Perú | 3–0 | Túpac Amaru | 25–17 | 25–12 | 25–14 | | | 75–43 | |

==== Round 3 ====
| Date | | Score | | Set 1 | Set 2 | Set 3 | Set 4 | Set 5 | Total | Report |
|---|---|---|---|---|---|---|---|---|---|---|
| 24 Jan | Túpac Amaru | 3–0 | Molivoleibol | 25–16 | 25–12 | 25–13 | | | 75–41 | |
| 25 Jan | Kazoku No Perú | 2–3 | Deportivo Wanka | 20–25 | 20–25 | 25–16 | 26–24 | 8–15 | 99–105 | |

== Second stage ==
The second stage of the tournament will see the best 10 teams from the first stage compete in another Round-Robyn system, according to the finishing will be the play-offs.

Pool standing procedure

1. Numbers of matches won
2. Match points
3. Sets ratio
4. Points ratio

Match won 3–0 or 3–1: 3 match points for the winner, 0 match points for the loser
Match won 3–2: 2 match points for the winner, 1 match point for the loser

Ranking

| Pos | Team | Pld | W | L | Pts | SPW | SPL | SPR | SW | SL | SR | Qualification |
|---|---|---|---|---|---|---|---|---|---|---|---|---|
| 1 | Alianza Lima | 20 | 18 | 2 | 52 | 1660 | 1440 | 1.153 | 55 | 18 | 3.056 | Third stage |
| 2 | Universidad San Martín | 20 | 16 | 4 | 49 | 1729 | 1519 | 1.138 | 54 | 23 | 2.348 | Third stage |
| 3 | Universitario | 20 | 15 | 5 | 44 | 1637 | 1396 | 1.173 | 49 | 23 | 2.130 | Third stage |
| 4 | Géminis | 20 | 12 | 8 | 34 | 1603 | 1592 | 1.007 | 41 | 31 | 1.323 | Third stage |
| 5 | Atlético Atenea | 20 | 11 | 9 | 35 | 1732 | 1730 | 1.001 | 44 | 36 | 1.222 | Third stage |
| 6 | Regatas Lima | 20 | 11 | 9 | 30 | 1751 | 1649 | 1.062 | 42 | 36 | 1.167 | Third stage |
| 7 | Circolo Sportivo Italiano | 20 | 10 | 10 | 29 | 1654 | 1633 | 1.013 | 37 | 41 | 0.902 | Third stage |
| 8 | Deportivo Soan | 20 | 5 | 15 | 18 | 1573 | 1733 | 0.908 | 29 | 48 | 0.604 | Third stage |
| 9 | Rebaza Acosta | 20 | 5 | 15 | 15 | 1579 | 1738 | 0.909 | 26 | 51 | 0.510 | |
| 10 | Olva Latino | 20 | 5 | 15 | 15 | 1574 | 1740 | 0.905 | 24 | 52 | 0.462 | |

=== Results ===
==== Round 1 ====
| Date | | Score | | Set 1 | Set 2 | Set 3 | Set 4 | Set 5 | Total | Report |
|---|---|---|---|---|---|---|---|---|---|---|
| 10 Jan | Géminis | 0–3 | Atlético Atenea | 22–25 | 21–25 | 20–25 | | | 63–75 | |
| 10 Jan | Universidad San Martín | 3–0 | Olva Latino | 25–21 | 25–18 | 25–20 | | | 75–59 | |
| 10 Jan | Universitario | 3–1 | Deportivo Soan | 25–21 | 18–25 | 25–10 | 25–21 | | 93–77 | |
| 11 Jan | Circolo Sportivo Italiano | 2–3 | Regatas Lima | 18–25 | 26–28 | 33–31 | 25–19 | 9–15 | 111–118 | |
| 11 Jan | Alianza Lima | 3–1 | Rebaza Acosta | 25–21 | 25–15 | 18–25 | 25–17 | | 93–78 | |

==== Round 2 ====
| Date | | Score | | Set 1 | Set 2 | Set 3 | Set 4 | Set 5 | Total | Report |
|---|---|---|---|---|---|---|---|---|---|---|
| 17 Jan | Rebaza Acosta | 1–3 | Deportivo Soan | 16–25 | 25–20 | 17–25 | 18–25 | | 76–95 | |
| 17 Jan | Alianza Lima | 3–2 | Atlético Atenea | 20–25 | 25–23 | 25–18 | 22–25 | 15–11 | 107–102 | |
| 17 Jan | Universidad San Martín | 2–3 | Regatas Lima | 17–25 | 25–21 | 19–25 | 25–23 | 6–15 | 92–109 | |
| 18 Jan | Circolo Sportivo Italiano | 0–3 | Géminis | 19–25 | 22–25 | 22–25 | | | 63–75 | |
| 18 Jan | Universitario | 3–2 | Olva Latino | 19–25 | 25–22 | 25–23 | 21–25 | 19–17 | 109–112 | |

==== Round 3 ====
| Date | | Score | | Set 1 | Set 2 | Set 3 | Set 4 | Set 5 | Total | Report |
|---|---|---|---|---|---|---|---|---|---|---|
| 24 Jan | Alianza Lima | 3–0 | Circolo Sportivo Italiano | 25–23 | 25–14 | 25–23 | | | 75–60 | |
| 24 Jan | Universidad San Martín | 3–0 | Géminis | 25–15 | 25–18 | 25–19 | | | 75–52 | |
| 25 Jan | Atlético Atenea | 2–3 | Deportivo Soan | 15–25 | 25–22 | 23–25 | 25–18 | 11–15 | 99–105 | |
| 25 Jan | Regatas Lima | 3–0 | Olva Latino | 25–15 | 25–19 | 26–24 | | | 76–58 | |
| 25 Jan | Universitario | 3–1 | Rebaza Acosta | 25–15 | 25–18 | 14–25 | 25–13 | | 89–71 | |

==== Round 4 ====
| Date | | Score | | Set 1 | Set 2 | Set 3 | Set 4 | Set 5 | Total | Report |
|---|---|---|---|---|---|---|---|---|---|---|
| 31 Jan | Circolo Sportivo Italiano | 0–3 | Deportivo Soan | 20–25 | 16–25 | 19–25 | | | 55–75 | |
| 31 Jan | Atlético Atenea | 3–1 | Rebaza Acosta | 25–15 | 26–24 | 25–27 | 28–26 | | 104–92 | |
| 31 Jan | Universitario | 3–0 | Regatas Lima | 25–16 | 26–24 | 25–23 | | | 76–63 | |
| 1 Feb | Géminis | 3–0 | Olva Latino | 25–16 | 25–21 | 25–21 | | | 75–58 | |
| 1 Feb | Alianza Lima | 3–2 | Universidad San Martín | 25–22 | 22–25 | 25–22 | 23–25 | 15–11 | 110–105 | |

=== Round 5 ===
| Date | | Score | | Set 1 | Set 2 | Set 3 | Set 4 | Set 5 | Total | Report |
|---|---|---|---|---|---|---|---|---|---|---|
| 7 Feb | Circolo Sportivo Italiano | 3–0 | Rebaza Acosta | 25–22 | 25–18 | 25–21 | | | 75–61 | |
| 7 Feb | Universidad San Martín | 3–0 | Deportivo Soan | 25–19 | 25–17 | 25–17 | | | 75–53 | |
| 7 Feb | Alianza Lima | 3–0 | Olva Latino | 25–17 | 25–22 | 25–23 | | | 75–62 | |
| 8 Feb | Regatas Lima | 2–3 | Géminis | 22–25 | 25–16 | 25–22 | 20–25 | 12–15 | 104–103 | |
| 8 Feb | Universitario | 0–3 | Atlético Atenea | 22–25 | 16–25 | 24–26 | | | 62–76 | |

==== Round 6 ====
| Date | | Score | | Set 1 | Set 2 | Set 3 | Set 4 | Set 5 | Total | Report |
|---|---|---|---|---|---|---|---|---|---|---|
| 11 Feb | Olva Latino | 3–1 | Deportivo Soan | 25–20 | 23–25 | 25–21 | 25–18 | | 98–84 | |
| 11 Feb | Alianza Lima | 3–1 | Regatas Lima | 25–22 | 21–25 | 25–20 | 25–17 | | 96–84 | |
| 11 Feb | Universidad San Martín | 3–0 | Rebaza Acosta | 25–18 | 26–24 | 25–12 | | | 76–54 | |
| 25 Feb | Atlético Atenea | 2–3 | Circolo Sportivo Italiano | 25–20 | 19–25 | 16–25 | 25–19 | 13–15 | 98–104 | |
| 25 Feb | Universitario | 1–3 | Géminis | 21–25 | 16–25 | 25–17 | 24–26 | | 86–93 | |

==== Round 7 ====
| Date | | Score | | Set 1 | Set 2 | Set 3 | Set 4 | Set 5 | Total | Report |
|---|---|---|---|---|---|---|---|---|---|---|
| 14 Feb | Regatas Lima | 3–1 | Deportivo Soan | 25–17 | 22–25 | 25–14 | 26–24 | | 98–80 | |
| 14 Feb | Universidad San Martín | 3–1 | Atlético Atenea | 25–13 | 21–25 | 25–11 | 25–11 | | 96–60 | |
| 14 Feb | Universitario | 3–0 | Circolo Sportivo Italiano | 25–15 | 25–19 | 25–18 | | | 75–52 | |
| 15 Feb | Rebaza Acosta | 3–2 | Olva Latino | 25–16 | 15–25 | 25–20 | 21–25 | 15–10 | 101–96 | |
| 15 Feb | Alianza Lima | 3–1 | Géminis | 17–25 | 25–17 | 25–17 | 25–21 | | 92–80 | |

==== Round 8 ====
| Date | | Score | | Set 1 | Set 2 | Set 3 | Set 4 | Set 5 | Total | Report |
|---|---|---|---|---|---|---|---|---|---|---|
| 28 Feb | Géminis | 3–0 | Deportivo Soan | 25–22 | 25–16 | 25–16 | | | 75–54 | |
| 28 Feb | Regatas Lima | 3–0 | Rebaza Acosta | 25–15 | 25–15 | 25–18 | | | 75–48 | |
| 28 Feb | Universidad San Martín | 0–3* | Circolo Sportivo Italiano | 0–25 | 0–25 | 0–25 | | | 0–75 | |
| 1 Mar | Atlético Atenea | 3–0 | Olva Latino | 25–22 | 25–16 | 25–14 | | | 75–52 | |
| 1 Mar | Alianza Lima | 3–1 | Universitario | 25–22 | 17–25 | 25–19 | 25–13 | | 92–79 | |

* Originally, Universidad San Martín defeated Circolo Sportivo Italiano 3–2 in sets (22–25, 25–27, 25–16, 25–23, 15–11). However, due to an improper lineup, as they had four foreign players on the court, Universidad San Martín was ruled to have forfeited the match, and the result was officially recorded as a 3–0 victory in favor of Circolo Sportivo Italiano.

==== Round 9 ====
| Date | | Score | | Set 1 | Set 2 | Set 3 | Set 4 | Set 5 | Total | Report |
|---|---|---|---|---|---|---|---|---|---|---|
| 7 Mar | Circolo Sportivo Italiano | 3–2 | Olva Latino | 19–25 | 27–25 | 28–26 | 22–25 | 15–7 | 111–108 | |
| 7 Mar | Atlético Atenea | 3–1 | Regatas Lima | 25–23 | 22–25 | 25–19 | 25–22 | | 97–89 | |
| 7 Mar | Universitario | 0–3 | Universidad San Martín | 21–25 | 23–25 | 17–25 | | | 61–75 | |
| 8 Mar | Géminis | 3–0 | Rebaza Acosta | 25–19 | 25–17 | 28–26 | | | 78–62 | |
| 8 Mar | Alianza Lima | 3–1 | Deportivo Soan | 25–22 | 25–22 | 15–25 | 25–22 | | 90–91 | |

== Third stage ==
=== Quarterfinals ===
==== First leg ====
| Date | | Score | | Set 1 | Set 2 | Set 3 | Set 4 | Set 5 | Total | Report |
|---|---|---|---|---|---|---|---|---|---|---|
| 14 Mar | Atlético Atenea | 1–3 | Géminis | 22–25 | 20–25 | 25–20 | 17–25 | | 84–95 | |
| 14 Mar | Alianza Lima | 3–0 | Deportivo Soan | 25–17 | 26–24 | 25–20 | | | 76–61 | |
| 15 Mar | Universidad San Martín | 3–1 | Circolo Sportivo Italiano | 19–25 | 25–20 | 25–15 | 32–30 | | 101–90 | |
| 15 Mar | Universitario | 3–1 | Regatas Lima | 25–17 | 25–17 | 17–25 | 25–17 | | 92–76 | |

==== Second leg ====
| Date | | Score | | Set 1 | Set 2 | Set 3 | Set 4 | Set 5 | Total | Report |
|---|---|---|---|---|---|---|---|---|---|---|
| 21 Mar | Circolo Sportivo Italiano | 1–3 | Universidad San Martín | 16–25 | 19–25 | 25–19 | 21–25 | | 81–94 | |
| 21 Mar | Regatas Lima | 3–2 | Universitario | 25–19 | 26–28 | 25–18 | 21–25 | 18–16 | 115–106 | |
| 22 Mar | Géminis | 0–3 | Atlético Atenea | 21–25 | 23–25 | 17–25 | | | 61–75 | |
| 22 Mar | Deportivo Soan | 1–3 | Alianza Lima | 19–25 | 24–26 | 25–22 | 17–25 | | 85–98 | |

==== Extra Game ====
| Date | | Score | | Set 1 | Set 2 | Set 3 | Set 4 | Set 5 | Total | Report |
|---|---|---|---|---|---|---|---|---|---|---|
| 25 Mar | Atlético Atenea | 0–3 | Géminis | 15–25 | 27–29 | 23–25 | | | 65–79 | |
| 25 Mar | Regatas Lima | 1–3 | Universitario | 14–25 | 25–23 | 19–25 | 13–25 | | 77–89 | |

== Fourth stage ==
=== 5th Place Play-off ===
| Date | | Score | | Set 1 | Set 2 | Set 3 | Set 4 | Set 5 | Total | Report |
|---|---|---|---|---|---|---|---|---|---|---|
| 28 Mar | Deportivo Soan | 1–3 | Atlético Atenea | 17–25 | 21–25 | 25–23 | 18–25 | | 81–98 | |
| 29 Mar | Circolo Sportivo Italiano | 0–3 | Regatas Lima | 19–25 | 21–25 | 20–25 | | | 60–75 | |

=== 7th Place Match ===
| Date | | Score | | Set 1 | Set 2 | Set 3 | Set 4 | Set 5 | Total | Report |
|---|---|---|---|---|---|---|---|---|---|---|
| 4 Apr | Deportivo Soan | 1–3 | Circolo Sportivo Italiano | 21–25 | 25–19 | 17–25 | 18–25 | | 81–94 | |

=== 5th Place Match ===
| Date | | Score | | Set 1 | Set 2 | Set 3 | Set 4 | Set 5 | Total | Report |
|---|---|---|---|---|---|---|---|---|---|---|
| 5 Apr | Atlético Atenea | 1–3 | Regatas Lima | 27–25 | 18–25 | 18–25 | 23–25 | | 86–100 | |

=== Semifinals ===
==== First leg ====
| Date | | Score | | Set 1 | Set 2 | Set 3 | Set 4 | Set 5 | Total | Report |
|---|---|---|---|---|---|---|---|---|---|---|
| 28 Mar | Géminis | 1–3 | Alianza Lima | 24–26 | 13–25 | 25–20 | 16–25 | | 78–96 | |
| 29 Mar | Universitario | 0–3 | Universidad San Martín | 21–25 | 22–25 | 23–25 | | | 66–75 | |

==== Second leg ====
| Date | | Score | | Set 1 | Set 2 | Set 3 | Set 4 | Set 5 | Total | Report |
|---|---|---|---|---|---|---|---|---|---|---|
| 4 Apr | Universidad San Martín | 0–3 | Universitario | 22–25 | 17–25 | 16–25 | | | 55–75 | |
| 5 Apr | Alianza Lima | 3–0 | Géminis | 25–15 | 25–22 | 25–13 | | | 75–50 | |

==== Extra Game ====
| Date | | Score | | Set 1 | Set 2 | Set 3 | Set 4 | Set 5 | Total | Report |
|---|---|---|---|---|---|---|---|---|---|---|
| 8 Apr | Universitario | 2–3 | Universidad San Martín | 23–25 | 25–20 | 21–25 | 25–18 | 13–15 | 107–113 | |

== Fifth stage ==
=== Bronze Medal Matches ===
==== First leg ====
| Date | | Score | | Set 1 | Set 2 | Set 3 | Set 4 | Set 5 | Total | Report |
|---|---|---|---|---|---|---|---|---|---|---|
| 18 Apr | Géminis | 0–3 | Universitario | 20–25 | 18–25 | 18–25 | | | 56–75 | |

==== Second leg ====
| Date | | Score | | Set 1 | Set 2 | Set 3 | Set 4 | Set 5 | Total | Report |
|---|---|---|---|---|---|---|---|---|---|---|
| 25 Apr | Universitario | 3–0 | Géminis | 25–22 | 25–19 | 25–22 | | | 75–63 | |

=== Gold Medal Matches ===
==== First leg ====
| Date | | Score | | Set 1 | Set 2 | Set 3 | Set 4 | Set 5 | Total | Report |
|---|---|---|---|---|---|---|---|---|---|---|
| 19 Apr | Universidad San Martín | 3–0 | Alianza Lima | 25–23 | 25–23 | 25–21 | | | 75–67 | |

==== Second leg ====
| Date | | Score | | Set 1 | Set 2 | Set 3 | Set 4 | Set 5 | Total | Report |
|---|---|---|---|---|---|---|---|---|---|---|
| 26 Apr | Alianza Lima | 3–1 | Universidad San Martín | 25–15 | 18–25 | 25–18 | 27–25 | | 95–83 | |

==== Extra game ====
| Date | | Score | | Set 1 | Set 2 | Set 3 | Set 4 | Set 5 | Total | Report |
|---|---|---|---|---|---|---|---|---|---|---|
| 3 May | Alianza Lima | 3–2 | Universidad San Martín | 25–20 | 24–26 | 25–22 | 19–25 | 15–13 | 108–106 | |

== Final standing ==
| Rank | Team |
|---|---|
| 1st place, gold medalist(s) | Alianza Lima |
| 2nd place, silver medalist(s) | Universidad San Martín |
| 3rd place, bronze medalist(s) | Universitario |
| 4 | Géminis |
| 5 | Regatas Lima |
| 6 | Atlético Atenea |
| 7 | Circolo Sportivo Italiano |
| 8 | Deportivo Soan |
| 9 | Rebaza Acosta |
| 10 | Olva Latino |
| 11 | Deportivo Wanka |
| 12 | Kazoku No Perú |

| Team qualified for the 2027 South American Club Championship |
| Team lost A1 category |

2025–26 Liga Peruana de Vóley Femenino;

Alianza Lima
6th title

== Awards ==
=== Individual awards ===
- Most valuable player – Luisa Fuentes Award
  - (France) Maëva Orlé (Alianza Lima)
- Best scorer
  - (Argentina) Nicole Pérez (Atlético Atenea)
- Best spiker
  - (Argentina) Elina Rodríguez (Alianza Lima)
- Best spiker 2
  - (Brazil) Fernanda Tomé (Universidad San Martín)
- Best central
  - (Brazil) Mara Leão (Universitario)
- Best central 2
  - (Peru) Clarivett Yllescas (Alianza Lima)
- Best setter
  - (Mexico) Paola Rivera (Universidad San Martín)
- Best opposite
  - (France) Maëva Orlé (Alianza Lima)
- Best libero
  - (Peru) Miriam Patiño (Universitario)
- Best manager
  - (Argentina) Facundo Morando (Alianza Lima)

== See also ==
- 2026 Women's South American Volleyball Club Championship
