= 2020 Copa Nacional de Vóley (Peru) =

Copa Nacional de Vóley
- Association: FPV
- League: Liga Peruana de Vóley Femenino
- Sport: Volleyball
- Duration: November 18, 2020 to December 20, 2020
- Games: 22
- Teams: 6
- Finals champions: Jaamsa (1st title)
- Runners-up: Alianza Lima

Seasons
- ← 2019–20 2020–21 →

The 2020 Copa Nacional de Voley (Spanish for: 2020 National Volleyball Cup) was an official volleyball competition organized by the Peruvian Volleyball Federation in 2020 as a replacement for the 2019–20 Liga Nacional Superior de Voleibol Femenino, which had to be canceled due to the COVID-19 pandemic. Jaamsa were crowned champions after defeating Alianza Lima in the final by 3 sets to 2.

== Teams ==
=== Competing Teams ===
Club	Manager
Alianza Lima	(Peru) Carlos Aparicio
Géminis	(Peru) Sara Joya
Jaamsa	(Cuba) Juan Carlos Gala
Rebaza Acosta	(Peru) Arturo Loja
Regatas Lima	(Argentina) Horacio Bastit
Universidad San Martín	(Colombia) Bryan Silva

== First stage ==
=== Group A ===
Pos	Team	Pld	W	L	Pts	SPW	SPL	SPR	SW	SL	SR	Qualification
1	Jaamsa	4	4	0	11	342	290	1.179	12	3	4.000	Second stage
2	Universidad San Martín	4	2	2	7	352	318	1.107	9	7	1.286	Second stage
3	Rebaza Acosta	4	0	4	0	239	325	0.735	1	12	0.083	5th Place Play-off

==== Results ====
Date		Score		Set 1	Set 2	Set 3	Set 4	Set 5	Total	Report
18 Nov	Universidad San Martín	3–1	Rebaza Acosta	25–16	25–16	22–25	25–20		97–77	
20 Nov	Rebaza Acosta	0–3	Jaamsa	19–25	21–25	26–28			66–78	
22 Nov	Jaamsa	3–2	Universidad San Martín	16–25	25–19	17–25	25–22	15–13	98–104	
25 Nov	Jaamsa	3–0	Rebaza Acosta	25–11	25–16	25–17			75–44	
27 Nov	Rebaza Acosta	0–3	Universidad San Martín	15–25	17–25	20–25			52–75	
29 Nov	Universidad San Martín	1–3	Jaamsa	10–25	19–25	25–16	22–25		76–91	

=== Group B ===
Pos	Team	Pld	W	L	Pts	SPW	SPL	SPR	SW	SL	SR	Qualification
1	Alianza Lima	4	3	1	10	396	355	1.115	11	6	1.833	Second stage
2	Regatas Lima	4	3	1	7	405	403	1.005	10	8	1.250	Second stage
3	Géminis	4	0	4	1	356	399	0.892	5	12	0.417	5th place play-off

==== Results ====
Date		Score		Set 1	Set 2	Set 3	Set 4	Set 5	Total	Report
18 Nov	Regatas Lima	1–3	Alianza Lima	21–25	25–21	16–25	26–28		88–96	
20 Nov	Alianza Lima	3–1	Géminis	25–17	20–25	25–23	25–16		95–81	
22 Nov	Géminis	1–3	Regatas Lima	19–25	31–29	19–25	23–25		92–104	
25 Nov	Alianza Lima	3–1	Géminis	25–9	23–25	25–18	25–23		98–75	
27 Nov	Alianza Lima	2–3	Regatas Lima	25–22	30–32	16–25	25–17	11–15	107–111	
29 Nov	Géminis	2–3	Regatas Lima	25–21	25–16	23–25	22–25	13–15	108–102	

== 5th Place Play-off ==
Date		Score		Set 1	Set 2	Set 3	Set 4	Set 5	Total	Report
9 Dec	Rebaza Acosta	1–3	Géminis	18–25	29–27	18–25	19–25		84–102	
12 Dec	Géminis	3–0	Rebaza Acosta	25–17	25–20	25–21			75–58	

== Second stage ==
Ranking

Pos	Team	Pld	W	L	Pts	SPW	SPL	SPR	SW	SL	SR	Qualification
1	Alianza Lima	3	3	0	7	281	251	1.120	9	4	2.250	Gold Medal Match
2	Jaamsa	3	2	1	6	272	261	1.042	8	5	1.600	Gold Medal Match
3	Universidad San Martín	3	1	2	3	187	193	0.969	3	6	0.500	
4	Regatas Lima	3	0	3	2	250	285	0.877	4	9	0.444	

=== Results ===
==== Round 1 ====
Date		Score		Set 1	Set 2	Set 3	Set 4	Set 5	Total	Report
12 Dec	Regatas Lima	2–3	Alianza Lima	25–23	25–20	19–25	22–25	12–15	103–108	
18 Dec	Universidad San Martín	0–3	Jaamsa	17–25	23–25	19–25			59–75	

==== Round 2 ====
Date		Score		Set 1	Set 2	Set 3	Set 4	Set 5	Total	Report
14 Dec	Jaamsa	3–2	Regatas Lima	24–26	25–17	11–25	25–21	17–15	102–104	
14 Dec	Universidad San Martín	0–3	Alianza Lima	21–25	11–25	21–25			53–75	

==== Round 3 ====
Date		Score		Set 1	Set 2	Set 3	Set 4	Set 5	Total	Report
16 Dec	Alianza Lima	3–2	Jaamsa	26–24	18–25	25–12	14–25	15–9	98–95	
16 Dec	Regatas Lima	0–3	Universidad San Martín	20–25	12–25	11–25			43–75	

== Final stage ==
=== Bronze Medal Matches ===
Date		Score		Set 1	Set 2	Set 3	Set 4	Set 5	Total	Report
20 Dec	Universidad San Martín	0–3	Regatas Lima	15–25	23–25	18–25			56–75	

=== Gold Medal Match ===
Date		Score		Set 1	Set 2	Set 3	Set 4	Set 5	Total	Report
20 Dec	Alianza Lima	2–3	Jaamsa	25–21	30–32	24–26	25–21	12–15	116–115	

== Final standing ==
Rank	Team
1st place, gold medalist(s)	Jaamsa
2nd place, silver medalist(s)	Alianza Lima
3rd place, bronze medalist(s)	Regatas Lima
4	Universidad San Martín
5	Géminis
6	Rebaza Acosta

Champion

2020 Copa Nacional de Vóley;

Jaamsa
1st title

== Awards ==
=== Individual awards ===
- Most valuable player
  - (Peru) Coraima Gómez (Jaamsa)
- Best scorer
  - (Peru) Karla Ortiz (Regatas Lima)
- Best spiker
  - (Peru) Brenda Lobatón (Alianza Lima)
- Best libero
  - (Peru) Miriam Patiño (Regatas Lima)
- Best receiver
  - (Peru) Miriam Patiño (Regatas Lima)
- Best setter
  - (Peru) Carla Rueda (Jaamsa)
- Best server
  - (Peru) Ysabella Sánchez (Alianza Lima)
- Best blocker
  - (Peru) Yujhamy Mosquera (Alianza Lima)
