= 2024–25 Liga Peruana de Vóley Femenino =

Liga Peruana de Vóley Femenino
- Association: FPV
- League: Liga Peruana de Vóley Femenino
- Sport: Volleyball
- Duration: December 7, 2024 to May 25, 2025
- Games: 123
- Teams: 12
- Relegated: Túpac Amaru
- Finals champions: Alianza Lima (5th title)
- Runners-up: Regatas Lima

Seasons
- ← 2023–24 2025–26 →

The 2024–25 Liga Peruana de Voley Femenino (Spanish for: 2024–25 Peruvian Women's Volleyball League) or 2024–25 LPV was the 23rd official season of the Peruvian Volleyball League. The defending champion, Alianza Lima, reclaimed the league title championship defeating Regatas Lima in the finals.

== Teams ==
=== Team changes ===
Promoted from 2023–24 LNIV	Relegated from 2023–24 LNSV
▲ Atlético Atenea (1st)	▼ Deportivo Alianza (12th)

=== Competing Teams ===
Club	Manager
Alianza Lima	(Brazil) Paulo Milagres (First Stage: Round 1–Second Stage: Round 6) (Argentina) Facundo Morando
Atlético Atenea	(Argentina) Lorena Góngora
Circolo Sportivo Italiano	(Argentina) Marcos Blanco
Deportivo Soan	(Argentina) Alejandro Altamirano
Deportivo Wanka	(Peru) Carlos Rivero
Géminis	(Brazil) Rogério Portela
Olva Latino	(Peru) Walter Lung
Rebaza Acosta	(Peru) Heinz Garro
Regatas Lima	(Argentina) Horacio Bastit
Túpac Amaru	(Peru) José Castillo (First Stage: Round 1–6) (Peru) Edwin Jiménez
Universidad San Martín	(Brazil) Vinícius Gamino
Universitario	(Peru) César Arrese

== First stage ==
The first round is a Round-Robin system where all 12 teams will play once against the other 11.

Pool standing procedure

1. Match points
2. Numbers of matches won
3. Sets ratio
4. Points ratio

Match won 3–0 or 3–1: 3 match points for the winner, 0 match points for the loser
Match won 3–2: 2 match points for the winner, 1 match point for the loser

Ranking

Pos	Team	Pld	W	L	Pts	SPW	SPL	SPR	SW	SL	SR	Qualification
1	Universitario	11	10	1	29	885	722	1.226	30	7	4.286	Second stage
2	Alianza Lima	11	9	2	29	922	733	1.258	31	8	3.875	Second stage
3	Universidad San Martín	11	9	2	26	869	714	1.217	28	9	3.111	Second stage
4	Regatas Lima	11	8	3	25	905	780	1.160	27	11	2.455	Second stage
5	Deportivo Soan	11	7	4	20	919	937	0.981	22	19	1.158	Second stage
6	Rebaza Acosta	11	7	4	19	933	914	1.021	24	18	1.333	Second stage
7	Circolo Sportivo Italiano	11	6	5	17	933	858	1.087	22	20	1.100	Second stage
8	Atlético Atenea	11	4	7	12	813	907	0.896	15	25	0.600	Second stage
9	Géminis	11	3	8	12	866	903	0.959	16	25	0.640	Cuadrangular por la permanencia
10	Olva Latino	11	2	9	5	782	938	0.834	9	30	0.300	Cuadrangular por la permanencia
11	Deportivo Wanka	11	1	10	4	741	912	0.813	8	30	0.267	Cuadrangular por la permanencia
12	Túpac Amaru	11	0	11	0	653	903	0.723	3	33	0.091	Cuadrangular por la permanencia

=== Results ===
==== Round 1 ====
Date		Score		Set 1	Set 2	Set 3	Set 4	Set 5	Total	Report
7 Dec	Regatas Lima	3–0	Olva Latino	25–14	25–21	25–21			75–56	
7 Dec	Rebaza Acosta	3–0	Circolo Sportivo Italiano	25–21	25–23	25–16			75–60	
7 Dec	Alianza Lima	3–0	Atlético Atenea	25–21	25–21	25–16			75–58	
8 Dec	Géminis	3–0	Túpac Amaru	25–23	25–19	25–17			75–59	
8 Dec	Universidad San Martín	3–0	Deportivo Wanka	25–16	25–15	25–20			75–51	
8 Dec	Universitario	3–0	Deportivo Soan	25–18	25–20	25–13			75–51	

==== Round 2 ====
Date		Score		Set 1	Set 2	Set 3	Set 4	Set 5	Total	Report
14 Dec	Atlético Atenea	3–0	Túpac Amaru	25–23	25–15	25–22			75–60	
14 Dec	Géminis	1–3	Deportivo Soan	21–25	25–27	25–14	32–34		103–100	
14 Dec	Universitario	3–0	Rebaza Acosta	25–20	25–23	25–21			75–64	
15 Dec	Universidad San Martín	3–0	Olva Latino	25–13	25–19	25–19			75–51	
15 Dec	Regatas Lima	2–3	Circolo Sportivo Italiano	21–25	25–23	25–18	21–25	11–15	103–106	
15 Dec	Alianza Lima	3–0	Deportivo Wanka	25–19	25–16	25–9			75–44	

==== Round 3 ====
Date		Score		Set 1	Set 2	Set 3	Set 4	Set 5	Total	Report
21 Dec	Atlético Atenea	0–3	Deportivo Soan	19–25	19–25	17–25			55–75	
21 Dec	Universidad San Martín	3–0	Circolo Sportivo Italiano	25–14	25–20	25–16			75–50	
21 Dec	Alianza Lima	3–0	Túpac Amaru	25–11	25–16	25–12			75–39	
22 Dec	Deportivo Wanka	2–3	Olva Latino	25–23	22–25	25–20	23–25	7–15	102–108	
22 Dec	Géminis	2–3	Rebaza Acosta	25–23	25–20	22–25	19–25	5–15	96–108	
22 Dec	Universitario	0–3	Regatas Lima	20–25	20–25	23–25			63–75	

==== Round 4 ====
Date		Score		Set 1	Set 2	Set 3	Set 4	Set 5	Total	Report
4 Jan	Deportivo Wanka	0–3	Circolo Sportivo Italiano	12–25	14–25	18–25			44–75	
4 Jan	Rebaza Acosta	3–2	Atlético Atenea	21–25	21–25	25–20	25–16	15–7	107–93	
4 Jan	Universitario	3–1	Universidad San Martín	18–25	28–26	25–13	25–18		96–82	
5 Jan	Túpac Amaru	1–3	Deportivo Soan	18–25	25–21	16–25	17–25		76–96	
5 Jan	Regatas Lima	3–0	Géminis	25–19	25–14	25–20			75–53	
5 Jan	Alianza Lima	3–0	Olva Latino	25–19	25–18	25–21			75–58	

==== Round 5 ====
Date		Score		Set 1	Set 2	Set 3	Set 4	Set 5	Total	Report
11 Jan	Olva Latino	0–3	Circolo Sportivo Italiano	13–25	20–25	19–25			52–75	
11 Jan	Atlético Atenea	1–3	Regatas Lima	22–25	25–23	26–28	14–25		87–101	
11 Jan	Alianza Lima	3–0	Deportivo Soan	25–13	25–18	25–20			75–51	
12 Jan	Túpac Amaru	0–3	Rebaza Acosta	21–25	14–25	19–25			54–75	
12 Jan	Universidad San Martín	3–0	Géminis	25–23	25–16	25–17			75–56	
12 Jan	Deportivo Wanka	0–3	Universitario	10–25	18–25	22–25			50–75	

==== Round 6 ====
Date		Score		Set 1	Set 2	Set 3	Set 4	Set 5	Total	Report
18 Jan	Atlético Atenea	0–3	Universidad San Martín	17–25	12–25	18–25			47–75	
18 Jan	Deportivo Soan	1–3	Rebaza Acosta	23–25	25–18	20–25	18–25		86–93	
18 Jan	Olva Latino	0–3	Universitario	21–25	12–25	15–25			48–75	
19 Jan	Deportivo Wanka	0–3	Géminis	15–25	27–29	16–25			58–79	
19 Jan	Túpac Amaru	0–3	Regatas Lima	25–27	14–25	24–26			63–78	
19 Jan	Alianza Lima	3–1	Circolo Sportivo Italiano	24–26	25–19	25–16	25–21		99–82	

==== Round 7 ====
Date		Score		Set 1	Set 2	Set 3	Set 4	Set 5	Total	Report
25 Jan	Deportivo Soan	3–1	Regatas Lima	10–25	25–19	25–20	26–24		86–88	
25 Jan	Olva Latino	1–3	Géminis	25–22	17–25	16–25	18–25		76–97	
25 Jan	Alianza Lima	3–1	Rebaza Acosta	25–27	25–17	25–18	25–16		100–78	
26 Jan	Deportivo Wanka	1–3	Atlético Atenea	18–25	25–22	21–25	23–25		87–97	
26 Jan	Túpac Amaru	0–3	Universidad San Martín	12–25	17–25	13–25			42–75	
26 Jan	Circolo Sportivo Italiano	1–3	Universitario	25–21	16–25	22–25	23–25		86–96	

==== Round 8 ====
Date		Score		Set 1	Set 2	Set 3	Set 4	Set 5	Total	Report
1 Feb	Túpac Amaru	0–3	Deportivo Wanka	27–29	14–25	18–25			59–79	
1 Feb	Deportivo Soan	0–3	Universidad San Martín	24–26	20–25	21–25			65–76	
1 Feb	Rebaza Acosta	1–3	Regatas Lima	26–24	17–25	22–25	13–25		78–99	
2 Feb	Olva Latino	1–3	Atlético Atenea	15–25	20–25	26–24	18–25		79–99	
2 Feb	Circolo Sportivo Italiano	3–2	Géminis	25–16	25–13	20–25	20–25	15–11	105–90	
2 Feb	Alianza Lima	2–3	Universitario	25–21	25–17	22–25	19–25	9–15	100–103	

==== Round 9 ====
Date		Score		Set 1	Set 2	Set 3	Set 4	Set 5	Total	Report
8 Feb	Olva Latino	3–1	Túpac Amaru	25–19	22–25	25–21	26–24		98–89	
8 Feb	Rebaza Acosta	1–3	Universidad San Martín	28–26	19–25	21–25	15–25		83–101	
8 Feb	Universitario	3–0	Géminis	25–18	25–17	27–25			77–60	
9 Feb	Circolo Sportivo Italiano	3–0	Atlético Atenea	25–19	25–23	25–9			75–51	
9 Feb	Deportivo Soan	3–1	Deportivo Wanka	25–22	20–25	26–24	25–15		96–86	
9 Feb	Alianza Lima	3–0	Regatas Lima	25–23	25–22	25–16			75–61	

==== Round 10 ====
Date		Score		Set 1	Set 2	Set 3	Set 4	Set 5	Total	Report
11 Feb	Deportivo Soan	3–1	Olva Latino	25–22	26–28	25–22	25–21		101–93	
11 Feb	Circolo Sportivo Italiano	3–1	Túpac Amaru	25–17	27–29	25–4	25–11		102–61	
11 Feb	Alianza Lima	3–0	Géminis	25–17	25–22	25–20			75–59	
12 Feb	Rebaza Acosta	3–1	Deportivo Wanka	25–22	25–22	22–25	25–18		97–87	
12 Feb	Universitario	3–0	Atlético Atenea	25–22	25–15	25–19			75–56	
12 Feb	Regatas Lima	3–0	Universidad San Martín	25–21	25–19	25–20			75–60	

==== Round 11 ====
Date		Score		Set 1	Set 2	Set 3	Set 4	Set 5	Total	Report
15 Feb	Circolo Sportivo Italiano	2–3	Deportivo Soan	25–27	21–25	25–20	25–17	21–23	117–112	
15 Feb	Universitario	3–0	Túpac Amaru	25–23	25–17	25–10			75–50	
15 Feb	Géminis	2–3	Atlético Atenea	20–25	19–25	25–14	25–16	9–15	98–95	
16 Feb	Rebaza Acosta	3–0	Olva Latino	25–21	25–20	25–22			75–63	
16 Feb	Regatas Lima	3–0	Deportivo Wanka	25–22	25–11	25–20			75–53	
16 Feb	Alianza Lima	2–3	Universidad San Martín	25–22	25–13	17–25	22–25	9–15	98–100	

== Cuadrangular por la permanencia ==
Ranking

Pos	Team	Pld	W	L	Pts	SPW	SPL	SPR	SW	SL	SR	Qualification
1	Géminis	3	3	0	8	270	221	1.222	9	3	3.000	
2	Olva Latino	3	2	1	6	282	287	0.983	8	6	1.333	
3	Deportivo Wanka	3	1	2	4	234	240	0.975	5	6	0.833	Qualification for Revalidación 2025
4	Túpac Amaru	3	0	3	0	228	266	0.857	2	9	0.222	Relegation to 2025–26 LNIV

=== Results ===
==== Round 1 ====
Date		Score		Set 1	Set 2	Set 3	Set 4	Set 5	Total	Report
22 Feb	Géminis	3–1	Túpac Amaru	25–22	19–25	25–18	25–18		94–83	
23 Feb	Olva Latino	3–2	Deportivo Wanka	16–25	25–22	20–25	25–21	15–12	101–105	

==== Round 2 ====
Date		Score		Set 1	Set 2	Set 3	Set 4	Set 5	Total	Report
1 Mar	Olva Latino	3–1	Túpac Amaru	25–16	19–25	25–17	25–23		94–81	
2 Mar	Géminis	3–0	Deportivo Wanka	25–22	25–15	25–14			75–51	

==== Round 3 ====
Date		Score		Set 1	Set 2	Set 3	Set 4	Set 5	Total	Report
8 Mar	Géminis	3–2	Olva Latino	25–9	19–25	17–25	25–16	15–12	101–87	
8 Mar	Deportivo Wanka	3–0	Túpac Amaru	28–26	25–20	25–18			78–64	

== Revalidación 2025 ==
Date		Score		Set 1	Set 2	Set 3	Set 4	Set 5	Total	Report
15 March	Deportivo Wanka	3–1	Deportivo Alianza	25–15	21–25	25–23	25–11		96–74	

== Second stage ==
The second stage of the tournament will see the best 8 teams from the first stage compete in another Round-Robin system, according to the finishing will be the play-offs.

Pool standing procedure

1. Match points
2. Numbers of matches won
3. Sets ratio
4. Points ratio

Match won 3–0 or 3–1: 3 match points for the winner, 0 match points for the loser
Match won 3–2: 2 match points for the winner, 1 match point for the loser Ranking

Pos	Team	Pld	W	L	Pts	SPW	SPL	SPR	SW	SL	SR	Qualification
1	Universidad San Martín	7	6	1	17	677	611	1.108	20	10	2.000	Third stage
2	Universitario	7	6	1	17	675	622	1.085	18	12	1.500	Third stage
3	Regatas Lima	7	5	2	16	636	589	1.080	18	10	1.800	Third stage
4	Alianza Lima	7	5	2	15	595	515	1.155	17	9	1.889	Third stage
5	Circolo Sportivo Italiano	7	3	4	10	572	580	0.986	14	13	1.077	Third stage
6	Deportivo Soan	7	2	5	6	515	583	0.883	9	17	0.529	Third stage
7	Rebaza Acosta	7	1	6	6	593	652	0.910	11	18	0.611	Third stage
8	Atlético Atenea	7	0	7	0	472	583	0.810	3	21	0.143	Third stage

=== Results ===
==== Round 1 ====
Date		Score		Set 1	Set 2	Set 3	Set 4	Set 5	Total	Report
22 Feb	Regatas Lima	3–0	Deportivo Soan	25–19	25–13	25–16			75–48	
22 Feb	Universitario	3–1	Atlético Atenea	25–16	27–29	25–20	25–20		102–85	
23 Feb	Universidad San Martín	3–2	Rebaza Acosta	23–25	21–25	25–23	25–15	15–11	109–99	
23 Feb	Alianza Lima	3–1	Circolo Sportivo Italiano	25–16	20–25	25–18	25–18		95–77	

==== Round 2 ====
Date		Score		Set 1	Set 2	Set 3	Set 4	Set 5	Total	Report
1 Mar	Universitario	3–1	Circolo Sportivo Italiano	25–20	25–17	18–25	25–11		93–73	
1 Mar	Universidad San Martín	3–1	Regatas Lima	25–17	25–19	21–25	25–20		96–81	
2 Mar	Atlético Atenea	0–3	Rebaza Acosta	25–23	25–21	25–18			62–75	
2 Mar	Alianza Lima	3–2	Deportivo Soan	20–25	25–16	23–25	25–18	15–13	108–97	

==== Round 3 ====
Date		Score		Set 1	Set 2	Set 3	Set 4	Set 5	Total	Report
8 Mar	Atlético Atenea	1–3	Regatas Lima	23–25	25–16	20–25	23–25		91–91	
9 Mar	Circolo Sportivo Italiano	3–0	Deportivo Soan	26–24	25–15	25–22			76–61	
9 Mar	Universitario	3–2	Rebaza Acosta	25–19	25–21	17–25	27–29	15–8	109–102	
19 Mar	Alianza Lima	1–3	Universidad San Martín	21–25	15–25	25–17	20–25		81–92	

==== Round 4 ====
Date		Score		Set 1	Set 2	Set 3	Set 4	Set 5	Total	Report
15 Mar	Rebaza Acosta	1–3	Regatas Lima	25–22	18–25	20–25	17–25		80–97	
15 Mar	Universitario	3–1	Deportivo Soan	25–22	25–14	20–25	25–14		95–75	
16 Mar	Circolo Sportivo Italiano	2–3	Universidad San Martín	25–18	25–23	18–25	18–25	11–15	97–106	
16 Mar	Atlético Atenea	0–3	Alianza Lima	13–25	9–25	19–25			41–75	

==== Round 5 ====
Date		Score		Set 1	Set 2	Set 3	Set 4	Set 5	Total	Report
22 Mar	Circolo Sportivo Italiano	3–0	Atlético Atenea	25–16	25–22	25–11			75–49	
22 Mar	Universitario	3–2	Regatas Lima	23–25	17–25	26–24	25–22	15–7	106–103	
23 Mar	Deportivo Soan	0–3	Universidad San Martín	19–25	16–25	16–25			51–75	
23 Mar	Rebaza Acosta	0–3	Alianza Lima	21–25	20–25	14–25			55–75	

==== Round 6 ====
Date		Score		Set 1	Set 2	Set 3	Set 4	Set 5	Total	Report
29 Mar	Rebaza Acosta	1–3	Circolo Sportivo Italiano	18–25	25–17	19–25	19–25		81–92	
29 Mar	Regatas Lima	3–1	Alianza Lima	25–21	20–25	25–18	25–22		95–86	
30 Mar	Deportivo Soan	3–0	Atlético Atenea	25–18	25–21	25–15			75–54	
30 Mar	Universitario	3–2	Universidad San Martín	31–29	17–25	25–18	24–26	15–11	112–109	

==== Round 7 ====
Date		Score		Set 1	Set 2	Set 3	Set 4	Set 5	Total	Report
5 Apr	Universidad San Martín	3–1	Atlético Atenea	25–20	25–23	15–25	25–22		90–90	
5 Apr	Deportivo Soan	3–2	Rebaza Acosta	22–25	25–17	25–22	21–25	15–11	108–100	
6 Apr	Regatas Lima	3–1	Circolo Sportivo Italiano	25–21	19–25	25–19	25–17		94–82	
6 Apr	Universitario	0–3	Alianza Lima	17–25	18–25	23–25			58–75	

== Third stage ==
=== Quarterfinals ===
==== First leg ====
Date		Score		Set 1	Set 2	Set 3	Set 4	Set 5	Total	Report
13 Apr	Universidad San Martín	3–0	Atlético Atenea	25–17	25–11	25–20			75–48	
12 Apr	Universitario	3–1	Rebaza Acosta	25–17	19–25	25–18	25–17		94–77	
12 Apr	Regatas Lima	3–1	Deportivo Soan	25–16	25–20	21–25	25–19		96–80	
13 Apr	Alianza Lima	3–0	Circolo Sportivo Italiano	25–12	25–16	25–21			75–49	

==== Second leg ====
Date		Score		Set 1	Set 2	Set 3	Set 4	Set 5	Total	Report
19 Apr	Atlético Atenea	0–3	Universidad San Martín	21–25	20–25	21–25			62–75	
20 Apr	Rebaza Acosta	2–3	Universitario	25–19	20–25	22–25	31–29	11–15	109–113	
20 Apr	Deportivo Soan	1–3	Regatas Lima	25–17	18–25	12–25	23–25		78–92	
19 Apr	Circolo Sportivo Italiano	0–3	Alianza Lima	28–30	15–25	11–25			54–80	

== Fourth stage ==
=== 5th Place Play-off ===
Date		Score		Set 1	Set 2	Set 3	Set 4	Set 5	Total	Report
26 Apr	Deportivo Soan	3–2	Rebaza Acosta	25–22	25–18	16–25	20–25	15–13	101–103	
27 Apr	Atlético Atenea	0–3	Circolo Sportivo Italiano	14–25	14–25	23–25			51–75	

=== 7th Place Match ===
Date		Score		Set 1	Set 2	Set 3	Set 4	Set 5	Total	Report
3 May	Rebaza Acosta	1–3	Atlético Atenea	23–25	25–19	18–25	23–25		89–94	

=== 5th Place Match ===
Date		Score		Set 1	Set 2	Set 3	Set 4	Set 5	Total	Report
4 May	Circolo Sportivo Italiano	2–3	Deportivo Soan	24–26	25–17	25–21	21–25	13–15	108–104	

=== Semifinals ===
==== First leg ====
Date		Score		Set 1	Set 2	Set 3	Set 4	Set 5	Total	Report
27 Apr	Alianza Lima	3–1	Universidad San Martín	25–21	20–25	25–13	25–18		95–77	
26 Apr	Universitario	0–3	Regatas Lima	25–17	19–25	25–18	25–17		57–77	

==== Second leg ====
Date		Score		Set 1	Set 2	Set 3	Set 4	Set 5	Total	Report
3 May	Universidad San Martín	1–3	Alianza Lima	25–22	20–25	23–25	15–25		83–97	
4 May	Regatas Lima	2–3	Universitario	25–22	25–19	19–25	26–28	7–15	102–109	

==== Extra Game ====
Date		Score		Set 1	Set 2	Set 3	Set 4	Set 5	Total	Report
7 May	Universitario	0–3	Regatas Lima	21–25	27–29	14–25			62–79	

== Fifth stage ==
=== Bronze Medal Matches ===
==== First leg ====
Date		Score		Set 1	Set 2	Set 3	Set 4	Set 5	Total	Report
11 May	Universidad San Martín	2–3	Universitario	21–25	23–25	25–19	25–19	20–15	104–103	

==== Second leg ====
Date		Score		Set 1	Set 2	Set 3	Set 4	Set 5	Total	Report
18 May	Universitario	0–3	Universidad San Martín	17–25	19–25	22–25			58–75	

==== Extra Game ====
Date		Score		Set 1	Set 2	Set 3	Set 4	Set 5	Total	Report
25 May	Universidad San Martín	3–2	Universitario	26–24	24–26	25–9	21–25	15–10	111–94	

=== Gold Medal Matches ===
==== First leg ====
Date		Score		Set 1	Set 2	Set 3	Set 4	Set 5	Total	Report
11 May	Alianza Lima	3–0	Regatas Lima	25–23	25–20	25–18			75–61	

==== Second leg ====
Date		Score		Set 1	Set 2	Set 3	Set 4	Set 5	Total	Report
18 May	Regatas Lima	3–1	Alianza Lima	25–19	16–25	25–15	25–22		91–81	

==== Extra Game ====
Date		Score		Set 1	Set 2	Set 3	Set 4	Set 5	Total	Report
25 May	Alianza Lima	3–0	Regatas Lima	25–15	25–21	25–16			75–52	

== Final standing ==
Rank	Team
1st place, gold medalist(s)	Alianza Lima
2nd place, silver medalist(s)	Regatas Lima
3rd place, bronze medalist(s)	Universidad San Martín
4	Universitario
5	Deportivo Soan
6	Circolo Sportivo Italiano
7	Atlético Atenea
8	Rebaza Acosta
9	Géminis
10	Olva Latino
11	Deportivo Wanka
12	Túpac Amaru

Team qualified for the 2026 South American Club Championship
Team lost A1 category

2024–25 Liga Peruana de Vóley Femenino;

Alianza Lima
5th title

== Awards ==
=== Individual awards ===
- Most valuable player – Luisa Fuentes Award
  - (Peru) Ysabella Sánchez (Alianza Lima)
- Best scorer
  - (United States) Emily Zinger (Regatas Lima)
- Best spiker
  - (Peru) Kiara Montes (Regatas Lima)
- Best spiker 2
  - (Brazil) Fernanda Tomé (Universidad San Martín)
- Best central
  - (Brazil) Sarah Evaristo (Universitario)
- Best central 2
  - (Peru) Clarivett Yllescas (Alianza Lima)
- Best setter
  - (Mexico) Paola Rivera (Regatas Lima)
- Best opposite
  - (France) Maëva Orlé (Alianza Lima)
- Best libero
  - (Peru) Rachell Hidalgo (Regatas Lima)
- Best manager
  - (Argentina) Facundo Morando (Alianza Lima)

== See also ==
- 2025 Women's South American Volleyball Club Championship
