= 2025 FIVB Volleyball Women's Club World Championship =

International women's volleyball club competition

Tournament details
- Host country: Brazil
- City: São Paulo
- Dates: 9–14 December
- Teams: 8 (from 5 confederations)
- Venue: 1 (in 1 host city)

Final positions
- Champions: (Italy) Savino Del Bene Scandicci (1st title)
- Runners-up: (Italy) Prosecco Doc Imoco Conegliano
- Third place: (Brazil) Osasco São Cristóvão Saúde
- Fourth place: (Brazil) Dentil Praia Clube

Tournament awards
- MVP: (Italy) Ekaterina Antropova
- Best Setter: (Serbia) Maja Ognjenović
- Best OH: (United States) Avery Skinner (Brazil) Gabriela Guimarães
- Best MB: (Italy) Marina Lubian (Brazil) Adenízia da Silva
- Best OPP: (Italy) Ekaterina Antropova
- Best Libero: (Brazil) Camila Brait

Tournament statistics
- Matches played: 16
- Attendance: 26,542 (1,659 per match)

The 2025 FIVB Volleyball Women's Club World Championship was the 18th edition of the competition. It was hosted in São Paulo, Brazil, from 9 to 14 December 2025. Italy's Savino Del Bene Scandicci were crowned champions for their first time. Hosts Osasco São Cristóvão Saúde won third place match and marked the return of a Brazilian club to the podium since Minas's second place at the 2018 edition.

== Qualification ==
Eight teams were qualified for the 2025 FIVB Club World Championship:

- One host club
- Two clubs from Europe (CEV)
- Two clubs from Asia (AVC)
- Two clubs from South America (CSV)
- One club from Africa (CAVB)

On 24 October 2025, one of the qualified AVC teams, VTV Bình Điền Long An, withdrew from the competition due to the scheduling conflict from the 2025 SEA Games. After failing to fill the quota place with another AVC team, FIVB decided to invite Orlando Valkyries from the United States to represent NORCECA.

Team (Confederation)	Qualified as
(Brazil) Osasco São Cristóvão Saúde (CSV)	Hosts
(Italy) Prosecco Doc Imoco Conegliano (CEV)	2025 European champions
(Italy) Savino Del Bene Scandicci (CEV)	2025 European runners-up
(Kazakhstan) Zhetysu VC (AVC)	2025 Asian champions
(Vietnam) ~~VTV Bình Điền Long An~~ (Note: VTV Bình Điền Long An (AVC) declined the invitation to participate in the Club World Championship.) (AVC)	2025 Asian runners-up
(Brazil) Dentil Praia Clube (CSV)	2025 South American champions
(Peru) Alianza Lima (CSV)	2025 South American runners-up
(Egypt) Zamalek SC (CAVB)	2025 African champions
(United States) Orlando Valkyries (NORCECA)	Wild card

== Venue ==
All matches
São Paulo, Brazil
Ginásio do Pacaembu
Capacity: 3,000

== Format ==
Eight participating teams are divided into two pools of four teams each in a round-robin match. The top two teams of each pool advance to the semifinals (Pool A winner vs. Pool B runner-up and the Pool B winner vs. Pool A runner-up). The winners of the two semifinals advance to the gold medal match and the losers to the bronze medal match.

== Pool standing procedure ==
1. Number of victories
2. Match points
3. Sets ratio
4. Points ratio
5. Result of the last match between the tied teams.

Match won 3–0 or 3–1: 3 match points for the winner and 0 match point for the loser.

Match won 3–2: 2 match points for the winner and 1 match point for the loser.

== Preliminary round ==
- All times are Brasília Time (UTC−03:00).

=== Pool A ===
Pos	Team	Pld	W	L	Pts	SW	SL	SR	SPW	SPL	SPR	Qualification
1	(Italy) Savino Del Bene Scandicci	3	3	0	9	9	0	MAX	231	188	1.229	Semifinals
2	(Brazil) Osasco São Cristóvão Saúde	3	2	1	5	6	5	1.200	254	232	1.095	Semifinals
3	(Peru) Alianza Lima	3	1	2	3	3	7	0.429	208	244	0.852	
4	(Kazakhstan) Zhetysu VC	3	0	3	1	3	9	0.333	259	288	0.899	

Source: Volleyball World

Date	Time		Score		Set 1	Set 2	Set 3	Set 4	Set 5	Total	Report
9 Dec	17:00	Zhetysu VC (Kazakhstan)	0–3	(Italy) Savino Del Bene Scandicci	22–25	21–25	20–25			63–75	Report
9 Dec	20:30	Osasco São Cristóvão Saúde (Brazil)	3–0	(Peru) Alianza Lima	25–14	25–17	25–18			75–49	Report
10 Dec	13:30	Zhetysu VC (Kazakhstan)	1–3	(Peru) Alianza Lima	26–24	21–25	23–25	24–26		94–100	Report
10 Dec	20:30	Osasco São Cristóvão Saúde (Brazil)	0–3	(Italy) Savino Del Bene Scandicci	29–31	22–25	15–25			66–81	Report
11 Dec	17:00	Savino Del Bene Scandicci (Italy)	3–0	(Peru) Alianza Lima	25–21	25–15	25–23			75–59	Report
11 Dec	20:30	Osasco São Cristóvão Saúde (Brazil)	3–2	(Kazakhstan) Zhetysu VC	25–17	23–25	21–25	25–18	19–17	113–102	Report

=== Pool B ===
Pos	Team	Pld	W	L	Pts	SW	SL	SR	SPW	SPL	SPR	Qualification
1	(Italy) Prosecco Doc Imoco Conegliano	3	3	0	9	9	0	MAX	225	149	1.510	Semifinals
2	(Brazil) Dentil Praia Clube	3	2	1	6	6	3	2.000	204	182	1.121	Semifinals
3	(United States) Orlando Valkyries	3	1	2	3	3	6	0.500	186	214	0.869	
4	(Egypt) Zamalek SC	3	0	3	0	0	9	0.000	156	226	0.690	

Source: Volleyball World

Date	Time		Score		Set 1	Set 2	Set 3	Set 4	Set 5	Total	Report
9 Dec	10:00	Dentil Praia Clube (Brazil)	3–0	(Egypt) Zamalek SC	25–11	25–17	25–15			75–43	Report
9 Dec	13:30	Prosecco Doc Imoco Conegliano (Italy)	3–0	(United States) Orlando Valkyries	25–14	25–13	25–19			75–46	Report
10 Dec	10:00	Dentil Praia Clube (Brazil)	3–0	(United States) Orlando Valkyries	25–23	25–15	28–26			78–64	Report
10 Dec	17:00	Prosecco Doc Imoco Conegliano (Italy)	3–0	(Egypt) Zamalek SC	25–14	25–16	25–22			75–52	Report
11 Dec	10:00	Zamalek SC (Egypt)	0–3	(United States) Orlando Valkyries	21–25	16–25	24–26			61–76	Report
11 Dec	13:30	Prosecco Doc Imoco Conegliano (Italy)	3–0	(Brazil) Dentil Praia Clube	25–12	25–19	25–20			75–51	Report

== Final round ==
- All times are Brasília Time (UTC−03:00).

Semi-finals
13 December
(Italy) Scandicci	3
(Brazil) Praia	0
13 December
(Italy) Conegliano	3
(Brazil) Osasco	1

Final
14 December
(Italy) Scandicci	3
(Italy) Conegliano	1
Third Place Match
14 December
(Brazil) Praia	0
(Brazil) Osasco	3

=== Semi-finals ===
Date	Time		Score		Set 1	Set 2	Set 3	Set 4	Set 5	Total	Report
13 Dec	13:00	Savino Del Bene Scandicci (Italy)	3–0	(Brazil) Dentil Praia Clube	25–23	26–24	25–19			76–66	Report
13 Dec	16:30	Prosecco Doc Imoco Conegliano (Italy)	3–1	(Brazil) Osasco São Cristóvão Saúde	21–25	25–23	25–16	25–16		96–80	Report

=== Third Place Match ===
Date	Time		Score		Set 1	Set 2	Set 3	Set 4	Set 5	Total	Report
14 Dec	13:00	Dentil Praia Clube (Brazil)	0–3	(Brazil) Osasco São Cristóvão Saúde	20–25	26–28	19–25			65–78	Report

=== Final ===
Date	Time		Score		Set 1	Set 2	Set 3	Set 4	Set 5	Total	Report
14 Dec	16:30	Savino Del Bene Scandicci (Italy)	3–1	(Italy) Prosecco Doc Imoco Conegliano	30–28	25–19	21–25	25–23		101–95	Report

== Final standing ==
Rank	Team
1st place, gold medalist(s)	(Italy) Savino Del Bene Scandicci
2nd place, silver medalist(s)	(Italy) Prosecco Doc Imoco Conegliano
3rd place, bronze medalist(s)	(Brazil) Osasco São Cristóvão Saúde
4	(Brazil) Dentil Praia Clube
5	(United States) Orlando Valkyries
6	(Peru) Alianza Lima
7	(Kazakhstan) Zhetysu VC
8	(Egypt) Zamalek SC

2025 Club World champions
(Italy)
Savino Del Bene Scandicci
First title

Team
Gaia Traballi, Marta Bechis, Avery Skinner, Brenda Castillo, Lindsey Ruddins, Sarah Franklin, Manuela Ribechi, Caterina Bosetti, Maja Ognjenović (c), Giulia Mancini, Emma Graziani, Linda Nwakalor, Ekaterina Antropova, Camilla Weitzel
Coach
(Italy) Marco Gaspari

== Awards ==
São Paulo 2025 Dream Team:

- Most valuable player
  (Italy) Ekaterina Antropova
- Best setter
  (Serbia) Maja Ognjenović
- Best outside spikers
  (United States) Avery Skinner
  (Brazil) Gabriela Guimarães
- Best middle blockers
  (Italy) Marina Lubian
  (Brazil) Adenízia da Silva
- Best opposite spiker
  (Italy) Ekaterina Antropova
- Best libero
  (Brazil) Camila Brait

== See also ==
- 2025 FIVB Volleyball Men's Club World Championship
