= Club Alianza Lima Vóley =

Professional women's volleyball section of Club Alianza Lima

Alianza Lima Vóley
- Full name: Club Alianza Lima Vóley
- Short name: Alianza
- Nickname: Aliancistas; Blanquiazules; Íntimas
- Founded: 15 November 1990
- Chairman: Rafael Medina
- Manager: (Argentina) Facundo Morando
- League: Liga Nacional Superior de Voleibol
- 2025–26: 1st, champions

Club Alianza Lima Vóley is the professional women's volleyball section of Club Alianza Lima based in Lima, Peru and currently plays in the Liga Nacional Superior de Voleibol. With five national titles, it is one of the largest volleyball clubs in Peru.

== History ==
Alianza Lima Vóley was founded on November 15, 1990. It entered the Peruvian volleyball scene after merging with Club Santa Teresita of the División Superior de Vóley and achieved its first official title in 1990. As a result, they qualified for the South American Championship for the first time, placing third.

Alianza Lima won the national league again in 1992. In the 1994 South American Championship, Alianza Lima placed second, being one of the most historic performances by the club.

After the reorganization of the Liga Nacional Superior de Voleibol, Alianza Lima failed to win the national championship after numerous second place finished in the 2020–21, 2021–22, 2022–23 seasons. However, in the 2023–24 season, Alianza Lima won the national championship after 31 years, defeating CV Universidad de San Martín de Porres in the final. In the 2025 Women's South American Volleyball Club Championship, they stopped their group, advancing to the semi-finals and defeated Estudiantes de La Plata to advance to the final. As a result, they qualified for the FIVB Club World Championship for the first time in their history.

In the 2024–25 Liga Peruana de Vóley Femenino, the club won the back-to-back championship by defeating Regatas Lima 3–0 in sets.

In the 2025 FIVB Volleyball Women's Club World Championship, held in December of that year, the club finished sixth in the overall standings. Their campaign included a victory over Zhetysu VC and two defeats against Osasco São Cristóvão Saúde and Savino Del Bene Scandicci.

On May 3, 2026, Alianza Lima were crowned three-time champions of the Liga Peruana de Vóley after defeating Universidad San Martín in a thrilling extra game, winning 3 sets to 2.

== Noche Blanquiazul ==
The Noche Blanquiazul is the name given to the annual presentation of the professional squad of Club Alianza Lima, one of Peru's Big Three.

Starting with a musical performance (usually criolla or salsa music), Noche Blanquiazul marks the introduction of the club's new players, followed by a friendly match against an international guest team. The event was first held in 2023.

== Managers ==
=== Winning Managers ===
Manager	Years	Titles
(Peru) Carlos Aparicio	1990–2022	1990, 1992
(Brazil) Rafael Petry	2023–2024	2023–24
(Argentina) Facundo Morando	2025–2026	2024–25, 2025–26

=== Other managers ===
- (Brazil) Paulo Milagres (2024–2025)
- (Argentina) Alejandro Schneider (2026)

== Honours ==
=== Senior titles ===
Keys

- Record
- ^{(s)} Shared record

Type	Competition	Titles	Runner-up	Third place	Winning years	Runner-up years	Third place years
National (League)	Liga Peruana de Vóley Femenino	5	5	—	1990, 1992, 2023–24, 2024–25, 2025–26	1991, 1993, 2020–21, 2021–22, 2022–23	—
Half-year / Short; Tournament (League)	Torneo Apertura	2	—	—	1992, 1993	—	—
Half-year / Short; Tournament (League)	Torneo Clausura	1	—	—	1992	—	—
Half-year / Short; Tournament (League)	Torneo Final	1	—	—	1992	—	—
National (Cups)	Copa Nacional de Vóley	—	1	—	—	2020	—
International (Cups)	Campeonato Sudamericano de Clubes de Voleibol Femenino	—	1	2	—	2025	1991, 2026
International (Cups)	Campeonato Sudamericano de Campeones	—	1	1	—	1994	1993

=== Summary ===
Senior competition	1st place, gold medalist(s)	2nd place, silver medalist(s)	3rd place, bronze medalist(s)	Total
Liga Peruana de Vóley Femenino	5	5	0	10
Copa Nacional de Voley	0	1	0	1
Campeonato Sudamericano de Clubes de Voleibol Femenino	0	1	2	3
Campeonato Sudamericano de Campeones	0	1	1	2
Total	5	8	3	16

== Performance in International competitions ==
- FIVB Women's Volleyball Club World Championship: 2 appearances

2025: 6th place
2026:

- Campeonato Sudamericano de Clubes de Voleibol Femenino: 5 appearances

1991: (bronze) Third place
1994: (silver) Runner-up
2025: (silver) Runner-up
2026: (bronze) Third place
2027:

- Campeonato Sudamericano de Campeones: 2 appearances

1993: (bronze) Third place
1996: 5th place
