= 1991 Women's South American Volleyball Club Championship =

1991 Women's South American Club Championship
Tournament details
- Host country: Brazil
- Dates: 9 – 14 April 1991
- Teams: 8
- Venue: 1 (in 1 host city)

Final positions
- Champions: (Brazil) Sadia (3rd title)

The 1991 Women's South American Volleyball Club Championship was the 20th official edition of the Women's South American Volleyball Club Championship, played by eight teams in April 1991, in Ribeirão Preto, Brazil.

Sadia won its third and overall title.

== Teams ==
Pool
(Argentina) Universidad de San Juan
(Bolivia) Juventud Estudiantil
Universidad de Chile
(Colombia) Jundeportes
(Brazil) Sadia
(Brazil) PAEC
(Peru) Alianza Lima
(Uruguay) Sportivo Italiano

== Preliminary round ==
=== Group A ===
Pos	Team	Pld	W	L	Pts	SW	SL	SR	SPW	SPL	SPR	Qualification
1	(Brazil) Sadia	3	3	0	9	9	0	MAX	135	27	5.000	Semifinals
2	(Peru) Alianza Lima	3	2	1	6	6	3	2.000	101	56	1.804	Semifinals
3	(Uruguay) Sportivo Italiano	3	1	2	3	0	0	—	0	0	—	
4	(Bolivia) Juventud Estudiantil	3	0	3	0	0	0	—	0	0	—	

==== Results ====
Date		Score		Set 1	Set 2	Set 3	Set 4	Set 5	Total
9 Apr	Alianza Lima (Peru)	3–0	(Bolivia) Juventud Estudiantil	15–0	15–2	15–1			45–3
9 Apr	Sadia (Brazil)	3–0	(Uruguay) Sportivo Italiano	15–3	15–1	15–7			45–11
10 Apr	Alianza Lima (Peru)	3–0	(Uruguay) Sportivo Italiano	15–1	15–7	15–0			45–8
10 Apr	Sadia (Brazil)	3–0	(Bolivia) Juventud Estudiantil	15–0	15–0	15–5			45–5
11 Apr	Sportivo Italiano (Uruguay)	3–1	(Bolivia) Juventud Estudiantil	–	–	–	–		–
11 Apr	Sadia (Brazil)	3–0	(Peru) Alianza Lima	15–5	15–5	15–1			45–11

=== Group B ===
Pos	Team	Pld	W	L	Pts	SW	SL	SR	SPW	SPL	SPR	Qualification
1	(Brazil) PAEC	3	3	0	9	0	0	—	9	0	MAX	Semifinals
2	(Colombia) Jundeportes	0	0	0	0	0	0	—	0	0	—	Semifinals
3	(Argentina) Universidad de San Juan	0	0	0	0	0	0	—	0	0	—	
4	Universidad de Chile	0	0	0	0	0	0	—	0	0	—	

==== Results ====
Date		Score		Set 1	Set 2	Set 3	Set 4	Set 5	Total
9 Apr	Universidad de San Juan (Argentina)	0–3	(Colombia) Jundeportes	10–15	9–15	8–15			27–45
9 Apr	PAEC (Brazil)	3–0	Universidad de Chile	–	–	–			–
10 Apr	Universidad de San Juan (Argentina)	3–0	Universidad de Chile	–	–	–			–
10 Apr	PAEC (Brazil)	3–0	(Colombia) Jundeportes	–	–	–			–
11 Apr	Jundeportes (Colombia)	3–1	Universidad de Chile	–	–	–			–
11 Apr	PAEC (Brazil)	3–0	(Argentina) Universidad de San Juan	–	–	–			–

== Final round ==
=== Seventh place match ===
Date		Score		Set 1	Set 2	Set 3	Set 4	Set 5	Total
13 Apr	Juventud Estudiantil (Bolivia)	3–2	Universidad de Chile	4–15	15–4	14–16	15–7	15–10	63–52

=== Fifth place match ===
Date		Score		Set 1	Set 2	Set 3	Set 4	Set 5	Total
13 Apr	Sportivo Italiano (Uruguay)	3–1	(Argentina) Universidad de San Juan	15–8	13–15	15–8	15–6		58–37

=== Semifinals ===
Date		Score		Set 1	Set 2	Set 3	Set 4	Set 5	Total
13 Apr	PAEC (Brazil)	3–0	(Peru) Alianza Lima	15–1	15–5	15–5			45–11
13 Apr	Sadia (Brazil)	3–0	(Colombia) Jundeportes	15–3	15–2	15–1			45–6

=== Third place match ===
Date		Score		Set 1	Set 2	Set 3	Set 4	Set 5	Total
14 Apr	Alianza Lima (Peru)	3–0	(Colombia) Jundeportes	15–4	15–4	15–0			45–8

=== Final ===
Date		Score		Set 1	Set 2	Set 3	Set 4	Set 5	Total
14 Apr	Sadia (Brazil)	3–0	(Brazil) PAEC	15–11	17–16	15–10			45–37

== Final standing ==
Rank	Team
1st place, gold medalist(s)	(Brazil) Sadia
2nd place, silver medalist(s)	(Brazil) PAEC
3rd place, bronze medalist(s)	(Peru) Alianza Lima
4	(Colombia) Jundeportes
5	(Uruguay) Sportivo Italiano
6	(Argentina) Universidad de San Juan
7	(Bolivia) Juventud Estudiantil
8	Universidad de Chile

Qualified for the 1991 FIVB Volleyball Women's Club World Championship

2025 Women's South American Volleyball Club Championship

Sadia
3rd title

== See also ==
- 1991 Men's South American Volleyball Club Championship
