= 2023–24 Liga Nacional Superior de Voleibol Femenino =

Liga Nacional Superior de Voleibol Femenino
- Association: FPV
- League: Liga Peruana de Vóley Femenino
- Sport: Volleyball
- Duration: November 17, 2023 to April 28, 2024
- Games: 123
- Teams: 12
- Relegated: Deportivo Alianza
- Finals champions: Alianza Lima (4th title)
- Runners-up: Universidad San Martín

Seasons
- ← 2022–23 2024–25 →

The 2023–24 Liga Nacional Superior de Voleibol Femenino (Spanish for: 2023–24 Women's Senior National Volleyball League) or 2023–24 LNSV was the 22nd official season of the Peruvian Volleyball League. Alianza Lima, reclaimed the league title championship defeating Universidad San Martín in the finals.

For the current season, Club Jaamsa adopted the name Deportivo Wanka, while Latino Amisa was renamed Olva Latino due to commercial sponsorship agreements.

== Teams ==
=== Team changes ===
Promoted from 2022–23 LNIV	Relegated from 2023–24 LNSV
▲ Universitario (1st)	▼ Sumak Selva (12th)

=== Competing Teams ===
Club	Manager
Alianza Lima	(Brazil) Rafael Petry
Circolo Sportivo Italiano	(Peru) Walter Lung
Deportivo Alianza	(Colombia) Manuel González (First Stage: Round 1–6) (Venezuela) César Acosta
Deportivo Soan	(Peru) Carlos Rivero (First Stage – Second Stage) (Peru) Arturo Loja
Deportivo Wanka	(Peru) Martín Rodríguez
Géminis	(Peru) Martín Escudero
Olva Latino	(South Korea) Byung-Tae Seo
Rebaza Acosta	(Cuba) Juan Carlos Gala (First Stage) (Peru) Heinz Garro
Regatas Lima	(Argentina) Horacio Bastit
Túpac Amaru	(Peru) José Castillo
Universidad San Martín	(Brazil) Vinícius Gamino
Universitario	(Peru) César Arrese

== First stage ==
The first round is a Round-Robin system where all 12 teams will play once against the other 11.

Pool standing procedure

1. Match points
2. Numbers of matches won
3. Sets ratio
4. Points ratio

Match won 3–0 or 3–1: 3 match points for the winner, 0 match points for the loser
Match won 3–2: 2 match points for the winner, 1 match point for the loser

Ranking

Pos	Team	Pld	W	L	Pts	SPW	SPL	SPR	SW	SL	SR	Qualification
1	Universidad San Martín	11	11	0	32	878	633	1.387	33	3	11.000	Second stage
2	Alianza Lima	11	10	1	30	947	714	1.326	32	8	4.000	Second stage
3	Regatas Lima	11	9	2	27	915	753	1.215	29	10	2.900	Second stage
4	Géminis	11	7	4	21	958	901	1.063	27	17	1.588	Second stage
5	Universitario	11	6	5	18	891	864	1.031	22	19	1.158	Second stage
6	Rebaza Acosta	11	6	5	17	827	754	1.097	19	18	1.056	Second stage
7	Circolo Sportivo Italiano	11	5	6	15	848	857	0.989	20	20	1.000	Second stage
8	Deportivo Soan	11	4	7	15	880	889	0.990	19	23	0.826	Second stage
9	Olva Latino	11	4	7	11	766	873	0.877	14	25	0.560	Cuadrangular por la permanencia
10	Deportivo Wanka	11	3	8	7	763	903	0.845	10	29	0.345	Cuadrangular por la permanencia
11	Túpac Amaru	11	1	10	4	670	894	0.749	8	30	0.267	Cuadrangular por la permanencia
12	Deportivo Alianza	11	0	11	1	546	854	0.639	2	33	0.061	Cuadrangular por la permanencia

=== Results ===
==== Round 1 ====
Date		Score		Set 1	Set 2	Set 3	Set 4	Set 5	Total	Report
17 Nov	Deportivo Wanka	3–1	Túpac Amaru	25–14	21–25	25–18	29–27		100–84	
17 Nov	Universidad San Martín	3–0	Deportivo Soan	25–14	25–15	25–15			75–44	
18 Nov	Rebaza Acosta	3–0	Olva Latino	25–16	25–17	25–15			75–48	
18 Nov	Regatas Lima	3–0	Universitario	25–20	25–16	25–20			75–56	
19 Nov	Circolo Sportivo Italiano	2–3	Géminis	23–25	25–18	25–23	18–25	6–15	97–106	
19 Nov	Alianza Lima	3–0	Deportivo Alianza	25–8	25–13	25–15			75–36	

==== Round 2 ====
Date		Score		Set 1	Set 2	Set 3	Set 4	Set 5	Total	Report
24 Nov	Rebaza Acosta	3–0	Circolo Sportivo Italiano	25–14	25–19	25–14			75–47	
24 Nov	Regatas Lima	3–0	Deportivo Alianza	25–10	25–15	25–16			75–41	
25 Nov	Deportivo Wanka	0–3	Géminis	22–25	22–25	12–25			56–75	
25 Nov	Alianza Lima	3–0	Túpac Amaru	25–9	25–20	25–15			75–44	
26 Nov	Universidad San Martín	3–0	Olva Latino	25–17	25–18	25–10			75–45	
26 Nov	Universitario	1–3	Deportivo Soan	25–18	18–25	14–25	16–25		73–93	

==== Round 3 ====
Date		Score		Set 1	Set 2	Set 3	Set 4	Set 5	Total	Report
28 Nov	Deportivo Alianza	0–3	Túpac Amaru	9–25	18–25	13–25			40–75	
28 Nov	Regatas Lima	3–0	Deportivo Soan	25–20	25–13	25–14			75–47	
28 Nov	Alianza Lima	3–1	Géminis	25–18	22–25	25–15	25–17		97–75	
30 Nov	Deportivo Wanka	0–3	Rebaza Acosta	19–25	17–25	16–25			52–75	
30 Nov	Universidad San Martín	3–0	Circolo Sportivo Italiano	25–18	25–15	25–21			75–54	
30 Nov	Universitario	3–2	Olva Latino	21–25	25–16	25–17	20–25	15–11	106–94	

==== Round 4 ====
Date		Score		Set 1	Set 2	Set 3	Set 4	Set 5	Total	Report
1 Dec	Deportivo Alianza	0–3	Géminis	18–25	22–25	18–25			58–75	
1 Dec	Regatas Lima	3–1	Túpac Amaru	25–17	25–27	25–16	25–16		100–76	
2 Dec	Universidad San Martín	3–0	Deportivo Wanka	25–14	25–14	25–22			75–50	
2 Dec	Universitario	3–1	Circolo Sportivo Italiano	25–22	23–25	25–23	25–16		98–86	
3 Dec	Deportivo Soan	2–3	Olva Latino	21–25	25–16	25–16	23–25	11–15	105–97	
3 Dec	Alianza Lima	3–0	Rebaza Acosta	25–19	25–17	25–23			75–59	

==== Round 5 ====
Date		Score		Set 1	Set 2	Set 3	Set 4	Set 5	Total	Report
9 Dec	Túpac Amaru	0–3	Géminis	12–25	9–25	16–25			37–75	
9 Dec	Regatas Lima	3–0	Olva Latino	25–19	25–22	25–17			75–58	
9 Dec	Universitario	3–1	Deportivo Wanka	25–21	20–25	25–23	25–22		95–91	
10 Dec	Deportivo Alianza	0–3	Rebaza Acosta	9–25	12–25	21–25			42–75	
10 Dec	Deportivo Soan	2–3	Circolo Sportivo Italiano	25–18	25–20	18–25	19–25	19–21	106–109	
10 Dec	Alianza Lima	2–3	Universidad San Martín	25–18	25–23	18–25	24–26	6–15	98–107	

==== Round 6 ====
Date		Score		Set 1	Set 2	Set 3	Set 4	Set 5	Total	Report
15 Dec	Olva Latino	0–3	Circolo Sportivo Italiano	16–25	21–25	19–25			56–75	
15 Dec	Deportivo Alianza	0–3	Universidad San Martín	8–25	13–25	18–25			39–75	
16 Dec	Deportivo Soan	2–3	Deportivo Wanka	25–22	25–13	16–25	22–25	12–15	100–100	
16 Dec	Túpac Amaru	1–3	Rebaza Acosta	16–25	17–25	25–16	15–25		73–91	
17 Dec	Regatas Lima	3–2	Géminis	18–25	25–22	22–25	25–16	15–9	105–97	
17 Dec	Universitario	1–3	Alianza Lima	14–25	25–22	14–25	21–25		74–97	

==== Round 7 ====
Date		Score		Set 1	Set 2	Set 3	Set 4	Set 5	Total	Report
5 Jan	Túpac Amaru	0–3	Universidad San Martín	15–25	13–25	17–25			45–75	
5 Jan	Regatas Lima	3–1	Circolo Sportivo Italiano	25–17	27–29	25–19	25–14		102–79	
6 Jan	Deportivo Alianza	0–3	Universitario	14–25	10–25	12–25			36–75	
6 Jan	Géminis	2–3	Rebaza Acosta	25–22	27–25	19–25	16–25	10–15	97–112	
7 Jan	Olva Latino	3–0	Deportivo Wanka	27–25	25–16	25–19			77–60	
7 Jan	Deportivo Soan	0–3	Alianza Lima	19–25	24–26	13–25			56–76	

==== Round 8 ====
Date		Score		Set 1	Set 2	Set 3	Set 4	Set 5	Total	Report
12 Jan	Deportivo Soan	3–0	Deportivo Alianza	25–19	25–18	25–21			75–58	
12 Jan	Circolo Sportivo Italiano	3–0	Deportivo Wanka	25–14	25–17	25–17			75–48	
13 Jan	Túpac Amaru	0–3	Universitario	18–25	18–25	7–25			43–75	
13 Jan	Regatas Lima	3–0	Rebaza Acosta	25–20	25–23	25–17			75–60	
14 Jan	Olva Latino	0–3	Alianza Lima	11–25	16–25	23–25			50–75	
14 Jan	Géminis	1–3	Universidad San Martín	23–25	25–21	20–25	13–25		81–96	

==== Round 9 ====
Date		Score		Set 1	Set 2	Set 3	Set 4	Set 5	Total	Report
19 Jan	Túpac Amaru	0–3	Deportivo Soan	13–25	10–25	23–25			46–75	
19 Jan	Regatas Lima	3–0	Deportivo Wanka	25–19	25–15	25–23			75–57	
20 Jan	Olva Latino	3–0	Deportivo Alianza	25–11	25–23	25–12			75–46	
20 Jan	Circolo Sportivo Italiano	1–3	Alianza Lima	21–25	25–22	18–25	12–25		76–97	
21 Jan	Rebaza Acosta	0–3	Universidad San Martín	22–25	18–25	13–25			53–75	
21 Jan	Géminis	3–2	Universitario	16–25	27–25	23–25	25–22	15–8	106–105	

==== Round 10 ====
Date		Score		Set 1	Set 2	Set 3	Set 4	Set 5	Total	Report
26 Jan	Circolo Sportivo Italiano	3–0	Deportivo Alianza	25–21	25–11	25–21			75–53	
26 Jan	Olva Latino	3–2	Túpac Amaru	25–19	25–27	25–21	22–25	16–14	113–106	
27 Jan	Géminis	3–1	Deportivo Soan	25–19	21–25	25–21	25–20		96–85	
27 Jan	Rebaza Acosta	0–3	Universitario	23–25	24–26	21–25			68–76	
28 Jan	Deportivo Wanka	0–3	Alianza Lima	15–25	12–25	18–25			45–75	
28 Jan	Regatas Lima	0–3	Universidad San Martín	22–25	23–25	21–25			66–75	

==== Round 11 ====
Date		Score		Set 1	Set 2	Set 3	Set 4	Set 5	Total	Report
2 Feb	Deportivo Wanka	3–2	Deportivo Alianza	16–25	25–17	23–25	25–17	15–13	104–97	
2 Feb	Rebaza Acosta	1–3	Deportivo Soan	18–25	18–25	25–19	23–25		84–94	
3 Feb	Géminis	3–0	Olva Latino	25–12	25–22	25–19			75–53	
3 Feb	Universidad San Martín	3–0	Universitario	25–20	25–20	25–18			75–58	
4 Feb	Circolo Sportivo Italiano	3–0	Túpac Amaru	25–10	25–18	25–13			75–41	
4 Feb	Regatas Lima	2–3	Alianza Lima	16–25	26–24	18–25	25–18	7–15	92–107	

== Cuadrangular por la permanencia ==
Ranking

Pos	Team	Pld	W	L	Pts	SPW	SPL	SPR	SW	SL	SR	Qualification
1	Olva Latino	3	3	0	9	258	222	1.162	9	2	4.500	
2	Túpac Amaru	3	2	1	6	233	202	1.153	7	3	2.333	
3	Deportivo Wanka	3	1	2	3	226	211	1.071	4	6	0.667	Qualification for Revalidación 2024
4	Deportivo Alianza	3	0	3	0	143	225	0.636	0	9	0.000	Relegation to 2024–25 LNIV

=== Results ===
==== Round 1 ====
Date		Score		Set 1	Set 2	Set 3	Set 4	Set 5	Total	Report
8 Feb	Olva Latino	3–0	Deportivo Alianza	25–11	25–18	25–15			75–44	
8 Feb	Deportivo Wanka	0–3	Túpac Amaru	22–25	15–25	19–25			56–75	

==== Round 2 ====
Date		Score		Set 1	Set 2	Set 3	Set 4	Set 5	Total	Report
9 Feb	Olva Latino	3–1	Túpac Amaru	18–25	25–17	25–18	25–23		93–83	
9 Feb	Deportivo Alianza	0–3	Deportivo Wanka	15–25	12–25	19–25			46–75	

==== Round 3 ====
Date		Score		Set 1	Set 2	Set 3	Set 4	Set 5	Total	Report
10 Feb	Túpac Amaru	3–0	Deportivo Alianza	25–17	25–23	25–13			75–53	
10 Feb	Olva Latino	3–1	Deportivo Wanka	26–24	13–25	25–22	26–24		90–95	

== Revalidación 2024 ==
Date		Score		Set 1	Set 2	Set 3	Set 4	Set 5	Total	Report
17 Feb	Deportivo Wanka	3–0	Kazoku No Perú	25–17	25–19	25–23			75–59	

== Second stage ==
The second stage of the tournament will see the best 8 teams from the first stage compete in another Round-Robyn system, according to the finishing will be the play-offs. Pool standing procedure 1. Match points
2. Numbers of matches won
3. Sets ratio
4. Points ratio

Match won 3–0 or 3–1: 3 match points for the winner, 0 match points for the loser
Match won 3–2: 2 match points for the winner, 1 match point for the loser Ranking

Pos	Team	Pld	W	L	Pts	SPW	SPL	SPR	SW	SL	SR
1	Universidad San Martín	7	7	0	21	678	553	1.226	21	7	3.000
2	Alianza Lima	7	6	1	20	637	550	1.158	20	7	2.857
3	Regatas Lima	7	5	2	15	656	567	1.157	17	11	1.545
4	Rebaza Acosta	7	3	4	9	601	619	0.971	13	15	0.867
5	Géminis	7	3	4	9	580	584	0.993	12	14	0.857
6	Circolo Sportivo Italiano	7	2	5	6	481	563	0.854	9	15	0.600
7	Universitario	7	2	5	5	532	620	0.858	9	17	0.529
8	Deportivo Soan	7	0	7	2	529	638	0.829	6	21	0.286

=== Results ===
==== Round 1 ====
Date		Score		Set 1	Set 2	Set 3	Set 4	Set 5	Total	Report
10 Feb	Regatas Lima	3–2	Rebaza Acosta	23–25	20–25	25–19	25–12	15–4	108–85	
16 Feb	Universidad San Martín	3–0	Deportivo Soan	25–20	25–16	25–14			75–50	
16 Feb	Géminis	0–3	Universitario	23–25	23–25	19–25			65–75	
17 Feb	Alianza Lima	3–1	Circolo Sportivo Italiano	25–14	24–26	25–22	25–13		99–75	

==== Round 2 ====
Date		Score		Set 1	Set 2	Set 3	Set 4	Set 5	Total	Report
18 Feb	Rebaza Acosta	1–3	Géminis	23–25	20–25	25–23	18–25		86–98	
18 Feb	Universidad San Martín	3–1	Universitario	29–31	25–14	25–14	25–20		104–79	
23 Feb	Circolo Sportivo Italiano	0–3	Regatas Lima	17–25	19–25	11–25			47–75	
23 Feb	Deportivo Soan	0–3	Alianza Lima	20–25	17–25	19–25			56–75	

==== Round 3 ====
Date		Score		Set 1	Set 2	Set 3	Set 4	Set 5	Total	Report
24 Feb	Universidad San Martín	3–1	Circolo Sportivo Italiano	25–18	25–13	24–26	25–20		99–77	
24 Feb	Alianza Lima	3–1	Universitario	25–16	25–21	17–25	25–18		92–80	
25 Feb	Deportivo Soan	2–3	Rebaza Acosta	18–25	26–24	28–26	22–25	13–15	107–115	
25 Feb	Regatas Lima	3–1	Géminis	25–23	25–15	22–25	25–23		97–86	

==== Round 4 ====
Date		Score		Set 1	Set 2	Set 3	Set 4	Set 5	Total	Report
2 Mar	Universidad San Martín	3–0	Rebaza Acosta	25–17	25–22	25–23			75–62	
2 Mar	Circolo Sportivo Italiano	3–0	Universitario	25–13	25–17	26–24			76–54	
3 Mar	Deportivo Soan	1–3	Géminis	25–22	21–25	18–25	18–25		82–97	
3 Mar	Alianza Lima	3–0	Regatas Lima	25–21	25–23	25–22			75–66	

==== Round 5 ====
Date		Score		Set 1	Set 2	Set 3	Set 4	Set 5	Total	Report
9 Mar	Circolo Sportivo Italiano	3–0	Deportivo Soan	25–14	25–23	27–25			77–62	
9 Mar	Universitario	1–3	Regatas Lima	22–25	11–25	29–27	28–30		90–107	
10 Mar	Rebaza Acosta	1–3	Alianza Lima	16–25	25–23	13–25	25–27		79–100	
10 Mar	Universidad San Martín	3–1	Géminis	25–18	23–25	25–21	25–15		98–79	

==== Round 6 ====
Date		Score		Set 1	Set 2	Set 3	Set 4	Set 5	Total	Report
16 Mar	Rebaza Acosta	3–1	Circolo Sportivo Italiano	22–25	25–13	27–25	25–17		99–80	
16 Mar	Géminis	1–3	Alianza Lima	21–25	16–25	25–22	18–25		80–97	
17 Mar	Universitario	3–2	Deportivo Soan	27–25	17–25	25–19	19–25	15–7	103–101	
17 Mar	Universidad San Martín	3–2	Regatas Lima	25–27	25–22	22–25	26–24	15–9	113–107	

==== Round 7 ====
Date		Score		Set 1	Set 2	Set 3	Set 4	Set 5	Total	Report
23 Mar	Regatas Lima	3–1	Deportivo Soan	25–15	21–25	25–14	25–17		96–71	
23 Mar	Universitario	0–3	Rebaza Acosta	20–25	14–25	17–25			51–75	
24 Mar	Géminis	3–0	Circolo Sportivo Italiano	25–15	25–20	25–14			75–49	
24 Mar	Universidad San Martín	3–2	Alianza Lima	26–28	25–12	25–23	23–25	15–11	114–99	

== Third stage ==
=== Quarterfinals ===
==== First leg ====
Date		Score		Set 1	Set 2	Set 3	Set 4	Set 5	Total	Report
30 Mar	Universidad San Martín	3–0	Deportivo Soan	27–25	25–12	25–16			77–53	
31 Mar	Alianza Lima	3–1	Universitario	25–21	14–25	25–23	25–18		89–87	
31 Mar	Regatas Lima	3–0	Circolo Sportivo Italiano	29–27	25–17	25–14			79–58	
30 Mar	Rebaza Acosta	3–2	Géminis	21–25	25–13	20–25	25–23	15–10	106–96	

==== Second leg ====
Date		Score		Set 1	Set 2	Set 3	Set 4	Set 5	Total	Report
6 Apr	Deportivo Soan	0–3	Universidad San Martín	15–25	18–25	22–25			55–75	
7 Apr	Universitario	1–3	Alianza Lima	25–22	13–25	24–26	16–25		78–98	
7 Apr	Circolo Sportivo Italiano	1–3	Regatas Lima	27–25	20–25	24–26	13–25		84–101	
6 Apr	Géminis	3–0	Rebaza Acosta	25–20	25–13	25–21			75–54	

==== Extra game ====
Date		Score		Set 1	Set 2	Set 3	Set 4	Set 5	Total	Report
10 Apr	Rebaza Acosta	1–3	Géminis	23–25	23–25	25–22	19–25		90–97	

== Fourth stage ==
=== 5th Place Play-off ===
Date		Score		Set 1	Set 2	Set 3	Set 4	Set 5	Total	Report
13 Apr	Deportivo Soan	0–3	Rebaza Acosta	15–25	22–25	12–25			49–75	
14 Apr	Universitario	3–2	Circolo Sportivo Italiano	21–25	25–22	25–13	23–25	15–6	109–91	

=== 7th Place Match ===
Date		Score		Set 1	Set 2	Set 3	Set 4	Set 5	Total	Report
17 Apr	Deportivo Soan	0–3	Circolo Sportivo Italiano	16–25	20–25	15–25			51–75	

=== 5th Place Match ===
Date		Score		Set 1	Set 2	Set 3	Set 4	Set 5	Total	Report
19 Apr	Rebaza Acosta	1–3	Universitario	27–25	21–25	17–25	17–25		82–100	

=== Semifinals ===
==== First leg ====
Date		Score		Set 1	Set 2	Set 3	Set 4	Set 5	Total	Report
13 Apr	Universidad San Martín	3–1	Géminis	25–20	23–25	25–18	25–20		98–83	
13 Apr	Alianza Lima	2–3	Regatas Lima	30–28	18–25	25–20	21–25	13–15	107–113	

==== Second leg ====
Date		Score		Set 1	Set 2	Set 3	Set 4	Set 5	Total	Report
14 Apr	Géminis	2–3	Universidad San Martín	24–26	25–16	26–24	22–25	11–15	108–106	
14 Apr	Regatas Lima	0–3	Alianza Lima	21–25	24–26	10–25			55–76	

==== Extra game ====
Date		Score		Set 1	Set 2	Set 3	Set 4	Set 5	Total	Report
17 Apr	Alianza Lima	3–1	Regatas Lima	25–21	23–25	25–22	25–14		98–82	

== Fifth stage ==
=== Bronze Medal Matches ===
==== First leg ====
Date		Score		Set 1	Set 2	Set 3	Set 4	Set 5	Total	Report
19 Apr	Géminis	3–2	Regatas Lima	23–25	25–13	20–25	29–27	15–10	112–100	

==== Second leg ====
Date		Score		Set 1	Set 2	Set 3	Set 4	Set 5	Total	Report
21 Apr	Regatas Lima	1–3	Géminis	23–25	25–18	18–25	18–25		84–93	

=== Gold Medal Matches ===
==== First leg ====
Date		Score		Set 1	Set 2	Set 3	Set 4	Set 5	Total	Report
19 Apr	Universidad San Martín	3–2	Alianza Lima	25–20	20–25	25–22	25–27	16–14	111–108	

==== Second leg ====
Date		Score		Set 1	Set 2	Set 3	Set 4	Set 5	Total	Report
21 Apr	Alianza Lima	3–0	Universidad San Martín	25–18	25–22	25–22			75–62	

==== Extra game ====
Date		Score		Set 1	Set 2	Set 3	Set 4	Set 5	Total	Report
28 Apr	Universidad San Martín	1–3	Alianza Lima	20–25	25–23	18–25	23–25		86–98	

== Final standing ==
Rank	Team
1st place, gold medalist(s)	Alianza Lima
2nd place, silver medalist(s)	Universidad San Martín
3rd place, bronze medalist(s)	Géminis
4	Regatas Lima
5	Universitario
6	Rebaza Acosta
7	Circolo Sportivo Italiano
8	Deportivo Soan
9	Olva Latino
10	Túpac Amaru
11	Deportivo Wanka
12	Deportivo Alianza

Team qualified for the 2025 South American Club Championship
Team lost A1 category

2023–24 Liga Peruana de Vóley Femenino;

Alianza Lima
4th title

== Awards ==
=== Individual awards ===
- Most valuable player
  - (France) Maëva Orlé (Alianza Lima)
- Best scorer
  - (Dominican Republic) Alondra Tapia (Géminis)
- Best spiker
  - (Brazil) Fernanda Tomé (Universidad San Martín)
- Best setter
  - (Brazil) Marina Scherer (Alianza Lima)
- Best receiver
  - (Peru) Miriam Patiño (Regatas Lima)
- Best blocker
  - (Peru) Flavia Montes (Regatas Lima)
- Best server
  - (Peru) Brenda Lobatón (Universidad San Martín)
- Best libero
  - (Peru) Pamela Cuya (Universidad San Martín)
