= 2026 Women's South American Volleyball Club Championship =

18th official edition of the Women's South American Volleyball Club Championship

2026 Women's South American Club Championship
Tournament details
- Host country: Peru
- Dates: 18 to 22 February
- Teams: 9
- Venue: 1 (in 1 host city)

Final positions
- Champions: (Brazil) SESI Bauru (1st title)

The 2026 Women's South American Volleyball Club Championship was the 39th official edition of the Women's South American Volleyball Club Championship, played by nine teams in February 2026.

SESI Bauru won its first and overall title, and qualified for the 2026 FIVB Volleyball Women's Club World Championship.

== Teams ==
Pool
(Bolivia) Olympic
(Ecuador) UVIV
(Brazil) Osasco
(Brazil) SESI Bauru
(Chile) Boston College
(Peru) Alianza Lima
(Peru) Regatas Lima
(Peru) Universidad San Martín
(Uruguay) Banco República

== Draw ==
Pot 1	Pot 2	Pot 3
(Peru) Alianza Lima; (Brazil) Osasco; (Brazil) SESI Bauru	(Chile) Boston College; (Peru) Regatas Lima; (Peru) Universidad San Martín	(Bolivia) Olympic; (Ecuador) UVIV; (Uruguay) Banco República

== Preliminary round ==
=== Group A ===
Pos	Team	Pld	W	L	Pts	SW	SL	SR	SPW	SPL	SPR	Qualification
1	(Peru) Alianza Lima	2	2	0	6	6	1	6.000	171	107	1.598	Semifinals
2	(Peru) Universidad San Martín	2	1	1	3	4	3	1.333	145	138	1.051	Semifinals
3	(Uruguay) Banco República	2	0	2	0	0	6	0.000	79	150	0.527	

Date		Score		Set 1	Set 2	Set 3	Set 4	Set 5	Total
18 Feb	Alianza Lima (Peru)	3–0	(Uruguay) Banco República	25–11	25–14	25–12			75–37
19 Feb	Alianza Lima (Peru)	3–1	(Peru) Universidad San Martín	21–25	25–10	25–17	25–18		96–70
20 Feb	Universidad San Martín (Peru)	3–0	(Uruguay) Banco República	25–14	25–15	25–13			75–42

=== Group B ===
Pos	Team	Pld	W	L	Pts	SW	SL	SR	SPW	SPL	SPR	Qualification
1	(Brazil) Osasco	2	2	0	6	6	0	MAX	150	75	2.000	Semifinals
2	(Chile) Boston College	2	1	1	3	3	3	1.000	119	130	0.915	
3	(Bolivia) Olympic	2	0	2	0	0	6	0.000	86	150	0.573	

Date		Score		Set 1	Set 2	Set 3	Set 4	Set 5	Total
18 Feb	Osasco (Brazil)	3–0	(Bolivia) Olympic	25–7	25–12	25–12			75–31
19 Feb	Osasco (Brazil)	3–0	(Chile) Boston College	25–8	25–18	25–18			75–44
20 Feb	Boston College (Chile)	3–0	(Bolivia) Olympic	25–16	25–20	25–19			75–55

=== Group C ===
Pos	Team	Pld	W	L	Pts	SW	SL	SR	SPW	SPL	SPR	Qualification
1	(Brazil) SESI Bauru	2	2	0	6	6	0	MAX	150	84	1.786	Semifinals
2	(Peru) Regatas Lima	2	1	1	3	3	3	1.000	135	100	1.350	
3	(Ecuador) UVIV	2	0	2	0	0	6	0.000	49	150	0.327	

Date		Score		Set 1	Set 2	Set 3	Set 4	Set 5	Total
18 Feb	Regatas Lima (Peru)	3–0	(Ecuador) UVIV	25–10	25–7	25–8			75–25
19 Feb	SESI Bauru (Brazil)	3–0	(Ecuador) UVIV	25–9	25–7	25–8			75–24
20 Feb	SESI Bauru (Brazil)	3–0	(Peru) Regatas Lima	25–21	25–19	25–20			75–60

== Final round ==
=== Bracket ===
Semifinals
21 February
(Peru) Alianza Lima	0
(Brazil) SESI Bauru	3
21 February
(Brazil) Osasco	3
(Peru) Universidad San Martín	0

Final
22 February
(Brazil) SESI Bauru	3
(Brazil) Osasco	0
3rd place
22 February
(Peru) Alianza Lima	3
(Peru) Universidad San Martín	1

=== 7th / 8th place match ===
Date		Score		Set 1	Set 2	Set 3	Set 4	Set 5	Total
21 Feb	Olympic (Bolivia)	3–0	(Uruguay) Banco República	25–18	25–17	25–22			75–57

=== Fifth place match ===
Date		Score		Set 1	Set 2	Set 3	Set 4	Set 5	Total
22 Feb	Regatas Lima (Peru)	3–0	(Chile) Boston College	26–24	25–15	25–22			76–61

=== Semifinals ===
Date		Score		Set 1	Set 2	Set 3	Set 4	Set 5	Total
21 Feb	Alianza Lima (Peru)	0–3	(Brazil) SESI Bauru	12–25	20–25	26–28			58–78
21 Feb	Universidad San Martín (Peru)	0–3	(Brazil) Osasco	25–27	23–25	18–25			66–75

=== Third place match ===
Date		Score		Set 1	Set 2	Set 3	Set 4	Set 5	Total
22 Feb	Alianza Lima (Peru)	3–1	(Peru) Universidad San Martín	25–22	19–25	25–16	25–20		94–83

=== Final ===
Date		Score		Set 1	Set 2	Set 3	Set 4	Set 5	Total
22 Feb	Osasco (Brazil)	0–3	(Brazil) SESI Bauru	23–25	20–25	20–25			63–75

== Final standing ==
Rank	Team
1st place, gold medalist(s)	(Brazil) SESI Bauru
2nd place, silver medalist(s)	(Brazil) Osasco
3rd place, bronze medalist(s)	(Peru) Alianza Lima
4	(Peru) Universidad San Martín
5	(Peru) Regatas Lima
6	(Chile) Boston College
7	(Bolivia) Olympic
8	(Uruguay) Banco República
9	(Ecuador) UVIV

Qualified for the 2026 FIVB Volleyball Women's Club World Championship

2026 Women's South American Volleyball Club Championship

SESI Bauru
1st title

== All-Star team ==
The following players were chosen for the tournament's "All-Star team":

- Most valuable player
  - (Brazil) Dani Lins (SESI Bauru)
- Best setter
  - (Brazil) Dani Lins (SESI Bauru)
- Best libero
  - (Peru) Esmeralda Sánchez (Alianza Lima)
- Best outside hitters
  - (Peru) Aixa Vigil (Universidad San Martín)
  - (United States) Caitie Baird (Osasco)
- Best Opposite
  - (Argentina) Bianca Cugno (Osasco)
- Best middle blockers
  - (Brazil) Diana Duarte (SESI Bauru)
  - (Brazil) Larissa Besen (Osasco)

== See also ==
- 2026 Men's South American Volleyball Club Championship
