= 2025 Women's South American Volleyball Club Championship =

17th official edition of the Women's South American Volleyball Club Championship

2025 Women's South American Club Championship
Tournament details
- Host country: Brazil
- Dates: 7 to 11 March
- Teams: 7
- Venue: 1 (in 1 host city)

Final positions
- Champions: (Brazil) Praia (3rd title)

Tournament awards
- MVP: (Brazil) Adenízia

The 2025 Women's South American Volleyball Club Championship was the 38th official edition of the Women's South American Volleyball Club Championship, played by seven teams from March, 7 to March 11, 2025, in Belo Horizonte, Brazil.

Praia won its third and overall title, and qualified for the 2025 FIVB Volleyball Women's Club World Championship.

== Teams ==
Pool
(Argentina) Estudiantes (LP)
(Bolivia) San Martín
(Brazil) Gerdau Minas
(Brazil) Praia
(Chile) Deportivo Murano
(Peru) Alianza Lima
(Uruguay) Atlético Barbato

== Preliminary round ==
=== Group A ===
Pos	Team	Pld	W	L	Pts	SW	SL	SR	SPW	SPL	SPR	Qualification
1	(Brazil) Gerdau Minas	2	2	0	6	6	0	MAX	150	73	2.055	Semifinals
2	(Argentina) Estudiantes (LP)	2	1	1	3	3	4	0.750	143	156	0.917	Semifinals
3	(Chile) Deportivo Murano	2	0	2	0	1	6	0.167	110	174	0.632	

Date		Score		Set 1	Set 2	Set 3	Set 4	Set 5	Total
7 Mar	Gerdau Minas (Brazil)	3–0	(Chile) Deportivo Murano	25–10	25–9	25–10			75–29
8 Mar	Gerdau Minas (Brazil)	3–0	(Argentina) Estudiantes (LP)	25–12	25–18	25–14			75–44
9 Mar	Estudiantes (LP) (Argentina)	3–1	(Chile) Deportivo Murano	25–18	24–26	25–22	25–15		99–81

=== Group B ===
Pos	Team	Pld	W	L	Pts	SW	SL	SR	SPW	SPL	SPR	Qualification
1	(Peru) Alianza Lima	3	3	0	9	9	1	9.000	242	148	1.635	Semifinals
2	(Brazil) Praia	3	2	1	6	7	3	2.333	238	158	1.506	Semifinals
3	(Uruguay) Atlético Barbato	3	1	2	3	3	8	0.375	176	251	0.701	
4	(Bolivia) San Martín	3	0	3	0	2	9	0.222	163	258	0.632	

Date		Score		Set 1	Set 2	Set 3	Set 4	Set 5	Total
7 Mar	Alianza Lima (Peru)	3–0	(Bolivia) San Martín	25–9	25–7	25–7			75–23
7 Mar	Praia (Brazil)	3–0	(Uruguay) Atlético Barbato	25–10	25–11	25–8			75–29
8 Mar	Alianza Lima (Peru)	3–0	(Uruguay) Atlético Barbato	25–9	25–12	25–16			75–37
8 Mar	Praia (Brazil)	3–0	(Bolivia) San Martín	25–10	25–15	25–12			75–37
9 Mar	San Martín (Bolivia)	2–3	(Uruguay) Atlético Barbato	21–25	25–21	19–25	25–22	11–15	101–108
9 Mar	Praia (Brazil)	1–3	(Peru) Alianza Lima	23–25	25–17	20–25	20–25		88–92

== Final round ==
=== Bracket ===
Semifinals
10 March
(Peru) Alianza Lima	3
(Argentina) Estudiantes (LP)	0
10 March
(Brazil) Praia	3
(Brazil) Gerdau Minas	2

Final
11 March
(Peru) Alianza Lima	0
(Brazil) Praia	3
3rd place
11 March
(Argentina) Estudiantes (LP)	0
(Brazil) Gerdau Minas	3

=== Fifth place match ===
Date		Score		Set 1	Set 2	Set 3	Set 4	Set 5	Total
10 Mar	Atlético Barbato (Uruguay)	3–2	(Chile) Deportivo Murano	21–25	25–18	25–15	21–25	16–14	108–97

=== Semifinals ===
Date		Score		Set 1	Set 2	Set 3	Set 4	Set 5	Total
10 Mar	Alianza Lima (Peru)	3–0	(Argentina) Estudiantes (LP)	25–18	25–19	25–9			75–46
10 Mar	Gerdau Minas (Brazil)	2–3	(Brazil) Praia	25–21	25–11	23–25	19–25	7–15	99–97

=== Third place match ===
Date		Score		Set 1	Set 2	Set 3	Set 4	Set 5	Total
11 Mar	Estudiantes (LP) (Argentina)	0–3	(Brazil) Gerdau Minas	14–25	5–25	16–25			35–75

=== Final ===
Date		Score		Set 1	Set 2	Set 3	Set 4	Set 5	Total
11 Mar	Praia (Brazil)	3–0	(Peru) Alianza Lima	25–15	25–12	25–19			75–46

== Final standing ==
Rank	Team
1st place, gold medalist(s)	(Brazil) Praia
2nd place, silver medalist(s)	(Peru) Alianza Lima
3rd place, bronze medalist(s)	(Brazil) Gerdau Minas
4	(Argentina) Estudiantes (LP)
5	(Uruguay) Atlético Barbato
6	(Chile) Deportivo Murano
7	(Bolivia) San Martín

Qualified for the 2025 FIVB Volleyball Women's Club World Championship

2025 Women's South American Volleyball Club Championship

Praia
3rd title

== All-Star team ==
The following players were chosen for the tournament's "All-Star team":

- Most valuable player
  - (Brazil) Adenízia (Praia)
- Best Opposite
  - (Brazil) Kissy Nascimento (Gerdau Minas)
- Best outside hitters
  - (Peru) Ysabella Sánchez (Alianza Lima)
  - (United States) Payton Caffrey (Praia)
- Best setter
  - (Brazil) Macris Carneiro (Praia)
- Best middle blockers
  - (Brazil) Adenízia (Praia)
  - (Argentina) Julieta Lazcano (Alianza Lima)
- Best libero
  - (Peru) Esmeralda Sánchez (Alianza Lima)

== See also ==
- 2025 Men's South American Volleyball Club Championship
