= Club de Regatas Lima =

Sports club in Lima, Peru

Club de Regatas "Lima"
- Short name: CRL; Regatas
- Sport: Various
- Founded: April 26, 1875; 151 years ago
- Based in: Lima
- President: Rafael Guarderas Radzinsky
- Website: crl.pe

Club de Regatas "Lima" (Spanish for Regatta Club of Lima; CRL), more commonly known as Regatas, is a multi-sport club based in Lima, Peru. Founded in 1875, it is one of the oldest sport clubs in South America and the biggest sports club in Peru. The club currently has over 5,000 members.

== History ==
The club was founded in 1875 as a rowing club by five young men who frequented the beaches of Chorrillos in what was then the Hotel Terry, a floating hotel built by Mateo Terry. During the War of the Pacific, 70 of the club's 109 members joined the Peruvian Army to defend the city against the incoming Chilean Army. Once the area was occupied in 1881, the club's belongings were looted and taken aboard the Toltén, a steamship of the Chilean Navy. It was consequently shut down in 1882, but reestablished in 1894 by the club's surviving members, numbered at 53 people.

Regatas rowing club in 1940.

35 new members were accepted without paying a registration fee. The first meeting of this new era took place at the National Club. The president elected was José Vicente Oyague y Soyer. The new statutes were approved on September 9, 1894. They read: "The Club's uniform, obligatory for practices, consists of a light blue cap (or white or straw hat with a light blue ribbon), a white flannel shirt and pants, and white shoes; for competitions, the cap and shirt must be made of silk." That same year, still without a venue, the Inter-School and International Sports Games called the Athletic Games were organized on a court in the La Legua neighborhood, which was then the only sports field in a destroyed Lima. These events were a way to raise funds to build the venue and bring boats from Europe. In 1895, President Nicolás de Piérola, also a member, facilitated obtaining the license that authorized the construction of a venue on the sea. A year later, on April 19, 1896, the emblematic wooden platform was inaugurated and blessed. The first Regatas venue was born. The club that survived the war would begin to expand.

The club's sports activities expanded from regattas to other nautical sports, and then to more than 40 sports disciplines, and its headquarters became important centers of social, cultural and recreational life for its members.

Founded over a century ago, Club de Regatas Lima has a large membership base and multiple facilities, and is recognized both locally and internationally.

Although the club began its activities in the homes of its first 5 members, and then moved to a rented hall in what was once the "Terry Hotel" in Chorrillos, today (as of March 31, 2009) the club has a total area of 2,754,285 square meters, spread over 5 locations in the city, beach and countryside; its members total 5,096 people and their families are 30,987, making Regatas the numerically most important club in South America.

== Description ==
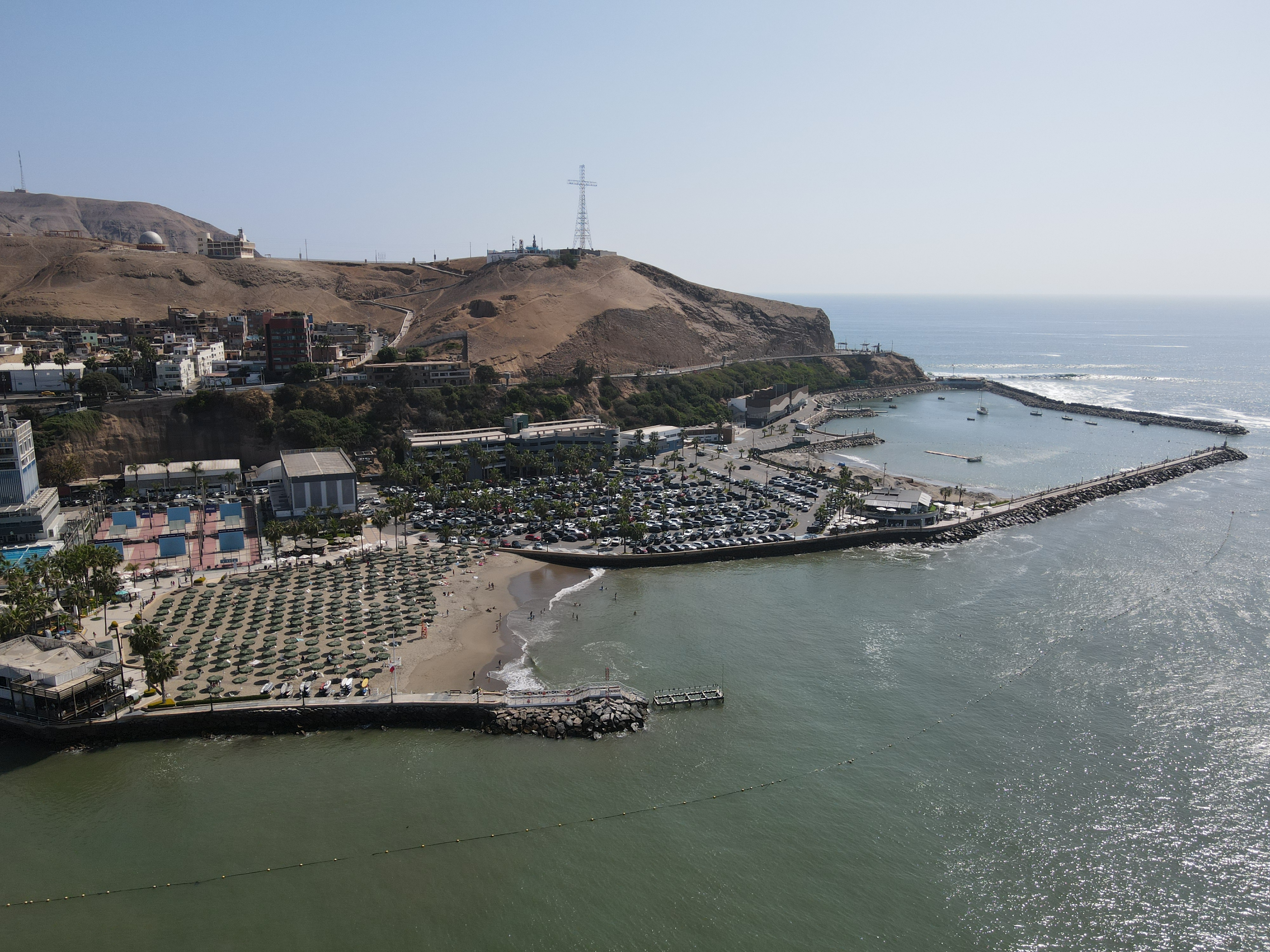
The club headquarters in 2024.

Regatas lima manages sport teams in multiple sports, including: rowing, sailing, football (soccer), basketball, swimming, and others. It has five venues: La Punta (where the rowing team trains and sleeps), La Cantuta (park with entertainment infrastructure), Villa, San Antonio (beach venue).

== Departments ==
Club Regatas de Lima currently has teams in 32 sports across all ages.

- Athletics
- Badminton
- Basketball
- Chess
- Fencing
- Golf
- Gymnastics
- Handball
- Judo
- Karate
- Lacrosse
- Pool
- Rowing
- Football
- Sailing
- Shooting
- Squash
- Surf
- Swimming
- Table tennis
- Taekwando
- Tennis
- Triathlon
- Volleyball
- Water polo
- Wind surfing

== Honours ==
=== Men's Football ===
The football department of Regatas participate in the Copa Perú, which is the fourth division of the Peruvian league. The club are 11 time winners of the Liga Distrital de San Isidro and have been runners-up 45 times. Regatas has a rivalry with Lima Cricket and Circolo Sportivo Italiano.

Type	Competition	Titles	Runner-up	Winning years	Runner-up years
Regional (League)	Liga Provincial de Lima	1	—	2026	—
Regional (League)	Liga Distrital de San Isidro	12	44	1968, 2000, 2003, 2004, 2005, 2009, 2010, 2013, 2014, 2019, 2022, 2023	1960, 1961, 1962, 1963, 1964, 1965, 1966, 1967, 1969-1999, 2001, 2002, 2006, 2007, 2008, 2024

=== Women's Volleyball ===
The volleyball section of Regatas was founded in 1954. Since then, the club has been one of the most successful and prominent in Peru, being 9 time winners of the Liga Nacional Superior de Voleibol.

Type	Competition	Titles	Runner-up	Winning years	Runner-up years
National (League)	Liga Peruana de Vóley Femenino	9	8	1996–97, 2002–03, 2005, 2005–06, 2006–07, 2016–17, 2020–21, 2021–22, 2022–23	1985–II, 1987, 1990–91, 2001, 2007–08, 2009–10, 2015–16, 2024–25
International (Cups)	Campeonato Sudamericano de Clubes de Voleibol Femenino	—	1	—	1970

=== Men's Volleyball ===
Type	Competition	Titles	Runner-up	Winning years	Runner-up years
National (League)	Liga Peruana de Vóley Masculino	3	9	1982, 2018, 2019	2004, 2005, 2006, 2007, 2016, 2017, 2021, 2022, 2023

=== Basketball ===
Regatas were 5 time winners of the Peruvian League. The club traditionally provides Peru's national basketball team with most of its key players.

- Peruvian League:

Winners (5): 2002, 2003, 2011, 2015, 2016

== See also ==
- List of football clubs in Peru
- Peruvian football league system
- Club's website:
