= Leslie Shaw discography =

- Studio albums: 1
- EPs: 1
- Singles: 25
- Music videos: 23

The discography of Peruvian recording artist Leslie Shaw as a solo artist consist of one studio album, one extended play, and twenty-five singles. She was signed onto Zona 25 records in 2008 and became a member of the Peruvian pop girl group Glow which released one single titled Signos before Shaw decided to pursue a solo career due to her wanting to do a different genre of music. After leaving the group, Shaw changed her music style to Rock music and went on to represent Peru at the 2011 Viña del Mar International Song Festival. She made it all the way to the finals and got second place with her song Destrozado y sin control. Since leaving the group, Shaw has had a successful career collaborating with international artist such as Thalía and Mau y Ricky. Her song Loco was certified gold in her native Perú while her songs Volverte A Ver and Decide went platinum, Si Me Ves Con Alguien went double platinum, and Faldita quadruple platinum. Her song Estoy Soltera became a hit and was named The #1 Hot Song in the Monitor Latino general charts in Perú and Mexico. The song was in collaboration with Mexican singer Thalía and Colombian singer Farina.

== Albums ==
=== Studio albums ===
| Title | Details |
|---|---|
| Destrozado y sin control | Released: 2010; Label: FMO Music Studio; Formats: CD, Digital Download, Streaming |

=== Extended plays ===
List of extended plays
| Title | Details |
|---|---|
| Yo Soy Leslie Shaw | Released: 2020; Label: Sony Music Latin; Formats: CD, Digital Download, Streaming |

== Singles ==
=== As lead artist ===
List of singles as lead artist, showing year released, selected chart positions, certifications, and originating album
| Title | Year | Peak chart positions | | | | | | | | | | Certifications | Album |
| Title | Year | PER | PER Pop | BOL Lat | COL | ECU | HON Pop | MEX | MEX Pop | US Latin Pop Digital Sales | VEN Pop | Certifications | Album |
|---|---|---|---|---|---|---|---|---|---|---|---|---|---|
| "Destrozado y sin control" | 2010 | 19 | — | — | — | — | — | — | — | — | — | | Destrozado y sin control |
| "Una vez más" | 2010 | — | — | — | — | — | — | — | — | — | — | | Destrozado y sin control |
| "Estúpida chica pop" | 2010 | — | — | — | — | — | — | — | — | — | — | | Destrozado y sin control |
| "Luz" | 2011 | — | — | — | — | — | — | — | — | — | — | | Destrozado y sin control |
| "Mientes" | 2011 | — | — | — | — | — | — | — | — | — | — | | Destrozado y sin control |
| "No me verás llorar" | 2012 | — | — | — | — | — | — | — | — | — | — | | Non-album singles |
| "Que esto no pare" | 2012 | — | — | — | — | — | — | — | — | — | — | | Non-album singles |
| "Aquí" (with Anna Carina and Sandra Muente) | 2012 | — | — | — | — | — | — | — | — | — | — | | Non-album singles |
| "Ven" | 2013 | — | — | — | — | — | — | — | — | — | — | | Non-album singles |
| "Instinto Animal" | 2014 | — | — | — | — | — | — | — | — | — | — | | Non-album singles |
| "Siempre más fuerte" | 2015 | — | — | — | — | — | — | — | — | — | — | | Non-album singles |
| "Decide" | 2016 | — | — | — | — | — | — | — | — | — | — | * UNIMPRO: Platinum | Non-album singles |
| "Loco" | 2017 | — | — | — | — | — | — | — | — | — | — | * UNIMPRO: Gold | Non-album singles |
| "Volverte A Ver" (with Legarda) | 2017 | — | — | — | — | — | — | — | — | — | — | * UNIMPRO: Platinum | Non-album singles |
| "Si Me Ves Con Alguien" | 2018 | 16 | — | — | — | — | — | — | — | — | — | * UNIMPRO: 2× Platinum | Non-album singles |
| "Faldita" (with Mau y Ricky) | 2019 | 2 | 1 | — | 31 | 78 | — | — | — | — | — | * UNIMPRO: 4× Platinum | Yo Soy Leslie Shaw |
| "Solterita De Oro" (with Lerica and Gente De Zona) | 2019 | — | — | — | — | — | — | — | — | — | — | | Non-album singles |
| "Cerquita De Mí (Remix)" (with Patrick Romantik) | 2019 | — | 4 | — | — | — | — | — | — | — | — | | Non-album singles |
| "Bombón" | 2019 | — | 8 | — | — | — | — | — | — | — | — | | Yo Soy Leslie Shaw |
| "Estoy Soltera" (with Thalía and Farina) | 2020 | 2 | 1 | 16 | — | — | 5 | 11 | 1 | 11 | 12 | | Yo Soy Leslie Shaw |
| "Alguien Que Cuide De Mi" | 2020 | — | — | — | — | — | — | — | — | — | — | | Non-album singles |
| "Sola y Soltera" (with El Prefe) | 2021 | — | — | — | — | — | — | — | — | — | — | | Non-album singles |
| "La Culpa" (with Jacob Forever and Mr Vla) | 2021 | — | — | — | — | — | — | — | — | — | — | | Non-album singles |
| "No Olvidó" | 2021 | — | — | — | — | — | — | — | — | — | — | | Non-album singles |
| "C.U.L.I.T.O" (with Saga WhiteBlack and Vitão) | 2021 | — | — | — | — | — | — | — | — | — | — | | Non-album singles |
| "No Y Si" (with TDA Papi "El CaraNalga") | 2022 | — | — | — | — | — | — | — | — | — | — | | Non-album singles |
| "Poderes" | 2022 | — | — | — | — | — | — | — | — | — | — | | Non-album singles |
| "Castigo" (with Marama) | 2022 | — | — | — | — | — | — | — | — | — | — | | Non-album singles |
| "Piscis" | 2023 | — | — | — | — | — | — | — | — | — | — | | Non-album singles |
| "Placer"(with Saga WhiteBlack) | 2023 | — | — | — | — | — | — | — | — | — | — | | Non-album singles |
| "No Quiero" | 2023 | — | — | — | — | — | — | — | — | — | — | | Non-album singles |
| "Diablos Azules" | 2023 | — | — | — | — | — | — | — | — | — | — | | Non-album singles |
| "Dile Adiós A Tu Ex" | 2023 | — | — | — | — | — | — | — | — | — | — | | Non-album singles |
| "Déjate Amar"(with Identico) | 2023 | — | — | — | — | — | — | — | — | — | — | | Non-album singles |
| "Fin De Semana"(with Hnos Yaipén) | 2023 | — | — | — | — | — | — | — | — | — | — | | Non-album singles |
| "Tipos Como Tú" | 2023 | — | — | — | — | — | — | — | — | — | — | | Non-album singles |
| "Tal Para Cual Parte II" | 2024 | — | — | — | — | — | — | — | — | — | — | | Non-album singles |
| "Peruanita de TV"(with Young Eiby) | 2024 | — | — | — | — | — | — | — | — | — | — | | Non-album singles |
| "Pendejerete"(with Armonia 10) | 2024 | 9 | — | — | — | — | — | — | — | — | — | | Non-album singles |
| "Hay Niveles"(with Marisol Y La Magia Del Norte) | 2024 | — | — | — | — | — | — | — | — | — | — | | Non-album singles |
| "Regalo De Navidad" | 2024 | — | — | — | — | — | — | — | — | — | — | | Non-album singles |
| "Bombea Bombea" | 2025 | — | — | — | — | — | — | — | — | — | — | | Non-album singles |
"—" denotes a recording that did not chart or was not released in that territory.

=== As featured artist ===
| Title | Year | Other artist(s) | Album |
|---|---|---|---|
| "Tal Para Cual" | 2016 | Mario Hart | Non-album single |
| "Ni Me Miras (Remix)" | 2018 | Yamal and Kalé | Non-album single |

=== With Glow ===
| Title | Year | Album |
|---|---|---|
| "Signos" | 2008 | Non-album single |
