= Thalía's Mixtape =

2023 studio album by Thalía

Studio album by Thalía
- Released: April 28, 2023
- Recorded: 2022
- Label: Sony Music Latin

Thalía chronology
Desamorfosis (2021)	Thalía's Mixtape (2023)	A Mucha Honra (2024)

Singles from Thalía's Mixtape
- 1. "Para No Verte Más" Released: March 1, 2023

Thalía's Mixtape is the nineteenth studio album by Mexican singer Thalía. It was released on April 28, 2023, by Sony Music Latin. It is a covers album that pays homage to some of the greatest Latin rock hits from the 1980s and 1990s. It was produced by Rafa Arcaute and Aureo Baqueiro.

== Production and release ==
The album was preceded by the stand-alone single "Psycho Bitch", released in November 2022.

On March 29, 2023, Thalía revealed through a video posted on her Instagram account the name of her new album, announcing that it would be available for pre-save the following day. On March 30, 2023, Thalia revealed the cover picture of the album as well as the release date of April 28, 2023.

On April 14, 2023, Thalía revealed the tracklist of the album through a video released on her official social media accounts.

== Promotion ==
On February 21, 2023, she revealed a collaboration with Mexican singer Kenia Os. The duo released a cover of the 1999 hit "Para No Verte Más", originally performed by Argentine band La Mosca Tsé Tsé, on March 2, 2023. This ended up becoming the lead single from the album, which was announced a few weeks later.

=== Thalía's Mixtape: El Soundtrack de Mi Vida ===
As a complement to the album, Thalía announced on April 13, 2023, a three-part music docuseries that premiered on May 2, 2023, through Paramount+ in the United States and Canada. It was also released in Latin America, Australia and Europe on May 3, 2023. In the three episodes she meets and performs with various artists such as Charly Alberti, Rocco Pachukote, David Summers, Kenia Os, Leon Leiden and Bruses. The series was produced by Santiago Zapata, Bruce Gilmer and Amanda Culkowski.

== Track listing ==
Thalía's Mixtape track listing
No.	Title	Writer(s)	Length
1.	"Devuélveme a Mi Chica" (with David Summers)	David Summers	3:23
2.	"Pachuco" (with Roco Pachukote)	Aldo Rubén Acuña Yance, Eulalio Cervantes Galarza, Enrique Montes Arellano, Adrián Navarro Maycotte, Rolando Javier Ortega Cuenca, José Luis Paredes Cacho	3:12
3.	"Florecita Rockera" (with Aterciopelados and León Leiden)	Héctor Vicente Buitrago	2:45
4.	"Persiana Americana"	Gustavo Adrián Cerati, Jorge Antonio Daffunchio	4:01
5.	"Me Cuesta Tanto Olvidarte"	José María Cano Andrés	3:23
6.	"Rayando el Sol"	Alejandro González Trujillo, José Fernando Emilio Olvera Sierra	4:23
7.	"Para No Verte Más" (with Kenia Os)	Guillermo Fabian Novellis, Pablo Tisera	3:18
8.	"Cuando Seas Grande"	Miguel Angel Mateos	3:51
9.	"Mixtape Medley" (Yo No Me Llamo Javier / No Voy En Tren / Obsesión / Mamá)	Carlos Alberto García, Miguel Angel Mateos, Pablo Carbonell Sanchez Gijon, Roberto Casas Torres, José Luis Moure Alonso	4:28
10.	"La Muralla Verde" (with Ben Carrillo y Bruses)	Horacio Eduardo Cantero, José Daniel Piccolo	3:07
11.	"Lucha de Gigantes"	Antonio Vega Talles	4:02
Total length:			39:00

== Accolades ==
The album is nominated for Urban/Pop Album of the Year at Premios Lo Nuestro.

Year	Award	Category	Result
2024	Premios Lo Nuestro	Urban/Pop Album of the Year	Nominated
