= Tick Tock (Thalía, Farina, and Sofía Reyes song) =

2020 song by Thalía, Farina, and Sofía Reyes

Single by Thalía, Farina and Sofía Reyes

from the album Desamorfosis
- Released: October 29, 2020
- Length: 2:50
- Label: Sony Latin
- Songwriters: Daniel Rondon; Santiago Castillo; Luigi Castillo; Musiana; Andy Clay; Thalía; Farina; Sofía Reyes

Thalía singles chronology
"Ten Cuidao" (2020)	"Tick Tock" (2020)	"Felíz Navidad" (2020)

Farina singles chronology
"Ten Cuidao" (2020)	"Tick Tock" (2020)	"La Boca" (2021)

Sofía Reyes singles chronology
"Échalo Pa' Ca" (2020)	"Tick Tock" (2020)	"Dancing on Dangerous" (2021)

Music video
- "Tick Tock" on YouTube

"Tick Tock" (stylized as "TICK TOCK") is a song by Mexican singer Thalía with Colombian singer Farina and Mexican singer Sofía Reyes. It was released by Sony Music on October 29, 2020 as the third single from Thalía's seventeenth studio album Desamorfosis.

== Background and release ==
The song along with the music video was officially released on October 29, 2020 as part of the 6th and final episode of the web series Latin Music Queens which stars the 3 singers. This marked the third time the Thalía and Farina collaborated after releasing Estoy Soltera a few months prior with Peruvian singer Leslie Shaw and on Ten Cuidao just 3 weeks prior.

== Commercial performance ==
The song peak at number 9 on the US Latin Pop Digital Songs Sales chart in Billboard. It also entered the Latin Pop Airplay charts in that country and was nominated for a Premio Juventud.

== Music video ==
The music video for the song was released on the same day. The video directed by Mike Ho and features the singers in futuristic outfits with western inspiration. The single achieved global success, adding in just a few weeks more than ten million views in the video clip.

== Charts ==
Chart performance for "Tick Tock"
Chart (2020–2021)	Peak position
US Latin Pop Airplay (Billboard)	17

== Awards and nominations ==
The song was nominated for Girl Power Collaboration at the Premios Juventud in 2021.

Year	Awards Ceremony	Category	Result
2021	Premios Juventud	Girl Power	Nominated
