= 2021–22 Liga Nacional Superior de Voleibol Femenino =

Liga Nacional Superior de Voleibol Femenino
- Association: FPV
- League: Liga Peruana de Vóley Femenino
- Sport: Volleyball
- Duration: December 16, 2021 to April 13, 2022
- Games: 79
- Teams: 10
- Finals champions: Regatas Lima (9th title)
- Runners-up: Alianza Lima

Seasons
- ← 2020–21 2022–23 →

The 2021–22 Liga Nacional Superior de Voleibol Femenino (Spanish for: 2021–22 Women's Senior National Volleyball League) or 2021–22 LNSV was the 20th official season of the Peruvian Volleyball League. Regatas Lima were crowned back-to-back champions after defeating Alianza Lima in the final.

== Teams ==
=== Competing Teams ===
Club	Manager
Alianza Lima	(Peru) Carlos Aparicio
Circolo Sportivo Italiano	(Peru) Walter Lung
Deportivo Alianza	(Venezuela) Deyvis Yustiz
Deportivo Soan	(Peru) Edwin Jiménez (First Stage: Round 1–3) (Peru) Nicolás Loja
Géminis	(Peru) Carlos Rivero
Jaamsa	(Peru) César Arrese (First Stage: Round 1–8) (Peru) Andrés Rodríguez
Latino Amisa	(Peru) Natalia Málaga
Rebaza Acosta	(Peru) Martín Rodríguez
Regatas Lima	(Argentina) Horacio Bastit
Universidad San Martín	(South Korea) Byung-Tae Seo (First Stage: Round 1) (Brazil) Mauricy Jacobs

== First stage ==
The first round is a Round-Robin system where all 10 teams will play once against the other 9.

Pool standing procedure

1. Match points
2. Numbers of matches won
3. Sets ratio
4. Points ratio

Match won 3–0 or 3–1: 3 match points for the winner, 0 match points for the loser
Match won 3–2: 2 match points for the winner, 1 match point for the loser

Ranking

Pos	Team	Pld	W	L	Pts	SPW	SPL	SPR	SW	SL	SR	Qualification
1	Regatas Lima	9	8	1	24	739	543	1.361	25	6	4.167	Serie A
2	Latino Amisa	9	6	3	19	720	675	1.067	20	12	1.667	Serie A
3	Alianza Lima	9	6	3	18	825	771	1.070	21	15	1.400	Serie A
4	Géminis	9	6	3	18	789	743	1.062	21	15	1.400	Serie A
5	Jaamsa	9	6	3	17	811	786	1.032	22	15	1.467	Serie B
6	Circolo Sportivo Italiano	9	4	5	12	712	692	1.029	22	15	1.467	Serie B
7	Rebaza Acosta	9	4	5	11	725	748	0.969	16	15	1.067	Serie B
8	Deportivo Alianza	9	2	7	7	795	863	0.921	14	25	0.560	Serie B
9	Deportivo Soan	9	2	7	7	636	698	0.911	10	22	0.455	
10	Universidad San Martín	9	1	8	2	542	775	0.699	6	26	0.231	Reclasificatorio 2022

Notes

* According to Resolution No. 001-CC-LNSF-F-2021/2022 issued by the Control Committee of the 2021–2022 LNSV, published on February 28, 2022, and following the complaint filed by Deportivo Soan, USMP was declared to have forfeited all matches in which player Alexandra Geraldine Machado Chávez participated, resulting in the loss of points and matches being awarded by default. Consequently, the results of the matches USMP 3–1 Deportivo Soan (Matchday 2) and Regatas Lima 1–3 USMP (Matchday 3) were officially amended in the LNSV standings to USMP 0–3 Deportivo Soan and Regatas Lima 3–0 USMP.

* According to the regulations of the 2021–2022 LNSV, the team that finished in ninth place in Stage 1 was to face the runner-up of the 2022 Liga Nacional Intermedia de Voley in a relegation playoff match to determine which team would compete in the 2022–2023 LNSV. This playoff was supposed to be contested by Deportivo Soan; however, the Peruvian Volleyball Federation created the 2022 Reclasificatorio in order to increase the number of participating teams from 10 to 12, resulting in the cancellation of the relegation playoff. As a result, Grupo Soan retained its place in the top division for the 2022–2023 season.

* Likewise, the Peruvian Volleyball Federation revoked the direct relegation of USMP to the 2022 Liga Nacional Intermedia de Voley, allowing the team to compete in the Relegation Playoff despite finishing in last place in the 2021–22 LNSV. USMP would only have been relegated to the 2022 LNIV had they failed to finish among the top three teams in the playoff; however, they went on to win the tournament without dropping a single set, thus retaining their place in the top division for the 2022–2023 season.

=== Results ===
==== Round 1 ====
Date		Score		Set 1	Set 2	Set 3	Set 4	Set 5	Total	Report
16 Dec	Regatas Lima	3–0	Deportivo Soan	25–15	25–23	25–17			75–55	
18 Dec	Deportivo Alianza	2–3	Alianza Lima	25–27	27–25	14–25	25–22	8–15	99–114	
18 Dec	Universidad San Martín	0–3	Circolo Sportivo Italiano	19–25	21–25	20–25			60–75	
19 Dec	Géminis	3–0	Rebaza Acosta	25–19	25–17	25–13			75–49	
19 Dec	Latino Amisa	0–3	Jaamsa	19–25	15–25	18–25			52–75	

==== Round 2 ====
Date		Score		Set 1	Set 2	Set 3	Set 4	Set 5	Total	Report
19 Jan	Regatas Lima	3–0	Deportivo Alianza	25–20	25–17	25–13			75–50	
19 Jan	Universidad San Martín	3–1	Deportivo Soan	25–22	22–25	25–19	25–23		97–89	
22 Jan	Géminis	3–1	Alianza Lima	20–25	25–23	25–20	25–20		95–88	
22 Jan	Latino Amisa	3–1	Circolo Sportivo Italiano	25–20	26–24	20–25	28–26		99–95	
23 Jan	Jaamsa	3–1	Rebaza Acosta	25–17	25–27	25–23	25–22		100–89	

==== Round 3 ====
Date		Score		Set 1	Set 2	Set 3	Set 4	Set 5	Total	Report
23 Jan	Regatas Lima	1–3	Universidad San Martín	22–25	19–25	25–15	23–25		89–90	
25 Jan	Géminis	3–1	Deportivo Alianza	20–25	25–23	25–14	26–24		96–86	
25 Jan	Latino Amisa	3–0	Deportivo Soan	25–19	25–13	25–16			75–48	
29 Jan	Jaamsa	3–2	Alianza Lima	25–23	25–19	21–25	19–25	17–15	107–107	
29 Jan	Rebaza Acosta	3–1	Circolo Sportivo Italiano	25–15	21–25	25–21	25–22		96–83	

==== Round 4 ====
Date		Score		Set 1	Set 2	Set 3	Set 4	Set 5	Total	Report
30 Jan	Regatas Lima	3–1	Géminis	15–25	25–15	25–15	25–20		90–75	
30 Jan	Latino Amisa	3–0	Universidad San Martín	25–19	25–19	25–21			75–59	
3 Feb	Jaamsa	2–3	Deportivo Alianza	25–19	16–25	25–20	17–25	14–16	97–105	
3 Feb	Rebaza Acosta	3–0	Deportivo Soan	25–16	25–18	25–13			75–47	
5 Feb	Circolo Sportivo Italiano	0–3	Alianza Lima	23–25	21–25	21–25			65–75	

==== Round 5 ====
Date		Score		Set 1	Set 2	Set 3	Set 4	Set 5	Total	Report
5 Feb	Regatas Lima	3–0	Latino Amisa	25–17	25–20	25–23			75–60	
6 Feb	Jaamsa	3–2	Géminis	25–23	21–25	15–25	25–20	15–7	101–100	
6 Feb	Rebaza Acosta	3–1	Universidad San Martín	26–24	20–25	25–18	25–22		96–79	
8 Feb	Circolo Sportivo Italiano	3–0	Deportivo Alianza	25–19	25–19	26–24			76–62	
8 Feb	Alianza Lima	3–1	Deportivo Soan	23–25	25–22	25–12	26–24		99–83	

==== Round 6 ====
Date		Score		Set 1	Set 2	Set 3	Set 4	Set 5	Total	Report
10 Feb	Regatas Lima	3–1	Jaamsa	23–25	25–22	25–17	25–17		98–81	
10 Feb	Rebaza Acosta	1–3	Latino Amisa	22–25	25–18	21–25	19–25		87–93	
12 Feb	Circolo Sportivo Italiano	3–0	Géminis	25–17	25–20	25–21			75–58	
12 Feb	Alianza Lima	3–1	Universidad San Martín	25–19	25–20	24–26	25–20		99–85	
13 Feb	Deportivo Soan	2–3	Deportivo Alianza	27–25	27–25	17–25	18–25	7–15	96–115	

==== Round 7 ====
Date		Score		Set 1	Set 2	Set 3	Set 4	Set 5	Total	Report
13 Feb	Regatas Lima	3–0	Rebaza Acosta	25–20	25–15	25–16			75–51	
15 Feb	Circolo Sportivo Italiano	1–3	Jaamsa	23–25	20–25	25–13	16–25		84–88	
15 Feb	Alianza Lima	0–3	Latino Amisa	21–25	17–25	21–25			59–75	
17 Feb	Deportivo Soan	1–3	Géminis	25–19	21–25	13–25	16–25		75–94	
17 Feb	Deportivo Alianza	2–3	Universidad San Martín	21–25	21–25	28–26	25–20	14–16	109–112	

==== Round 8 ====
Date		Score		Set 1	Set 2	Set 3	Set 4	Set 5	Total	Report
19 Feb	Regatas Lima	3–1	Circolo Sportivo Italiano	25–22	25–19	17–25	25–15		92–81	
19 Feb	Alianza Lima	3–1	Rebaza Acosta	25–17	25–16	19–25	25–20		94–78	
20 Feb	Deportivo Soan	3–1	Jaamsa	25–21	20–25	25–22	25–19		95–87	
20 Feb	Deportivo Alianza	1–3	Latino Amisa	25–18	22–25	15–25	15–25		77–93	
22 Feb	Universidad San Martín	1–3	Géminis	25–21	11–25	23–25	22–25		81–96	

==== Round 9 ====
Date		Score		Set 1	Set 2	Set 3	Set 4	Set 5	Total	Report
22 Feb	Deportivo Soan	0–3	Circolo Sportivo Italiano	26–28	20–25	16–25			62–78	
24 Feb	Deportivo Alianza	2–3	Rebaza Acosta	25–19	20–25	10–25	25–20		92–104	
24 Feb	Universidad San Martín	0–3	Jaamsa	23–25	17–25	16–25			56–75	
26 Feb	Géminis	3–2	Latino Amisa	19–25	16–25	25–19	25–19	15–10	100–98	
26 Feb	Regatas Lima	1–3	Alianza Lima	19–25	25–15	19–25	21–25		84–90	

== Reclasificatorio 2022 ==
In order to increase the number of teams in the 2022–23 Liga Nacional Superior de Voleibol Femenino from 10 to 12, the Peruvian Volleyball Federation organized the 2022 Reclasificatorio, which awarded three spots for the 2022–23 LNSV.

The tournament featured seven teams from four regions of Peru: four clubs from Lima, one from Arequipa, one from San Martín, and one from Áncash, and was held from July 19 to 24 at the El Olivar Coliseum in Jesús María District.

=== First stage ===
==== Serie A ====
Ranking

Pos	Team	Pld	W	L	Pts	SPW	SPL	SPR	SW	SL	SR	Qualification
1	Universidad San Martín	3	3	0	9	225	108	2.083	9	0	MAX	Cuadrangular Final
2	Sumak Selva	3	2	1	6	206	218	0.945	6	4	1.500	Cuadrangular Final
3	Real Mariscal Cáceres	3	1	2	3	194	233	0.833	3	0	MAX	
4	Atlético Faraday	3	0	3	0	200	266	0.752	2	9	0.222	

===== Results =====
Date		Score		Set 1	Set 2	Set 3	Set 4	Set 5	Total	Report
19 Jul	Atlético Faraday	1–3	Sumak Selva	25–16	26–28	12–25	18–25		81–94	
19 Jul	Universidad San Martín	3–0	Real Mariscal Cáceres	25–9	25–9	25–17			75–35	
20 Jul	Universidad San Martín	3–0	Sumak Selva	25–18	25–5	25–14			75–37	
20 Jul	Atlético Faraday	1–3	Real Mariscal Cáceres	24–26	22–25	25–21	12–25		83–97	
21 Jul	Sumak Selva	3–0	Real Mariscal Cáceres	25–20	25–22	25–20			75–62	
21 Jul	Universidad San Martín	3–0	Atlético Faraday	25–8	25–10	25–18			75–36	

==== Serie B ====
Ranking

Pos	Team	Pld	W	L	Pts	SPW	SPL	SPR	SW	SL	SR	Qualification
1	Túpac Amaru	2	2	0	6	152	73	2.082	6	0	MAX	Cuadrangular Final
2	Los Brillantes	2	1	1	3	125	110	1.136	3	3	1.000	Cuadrangular Final
3	Sport Performance	2	0	2	0	56	150	0.373	0	6	0.000	

===== Results =====
Date		Score		Set 1	Set 2	Set 3	Set 4	Set 5	Total	Report
19 Jul	Túpac Amaru	3–0	Los Brillantes	25–9	27–25	25–16			77–50	
20 Jul	Túpac Amaru	3–0	Sport Performance	25–3	25–12	25–8			75–23	
21 Jul	Sport Performance	0–3	Los Brillantes	9–25	13–25	11–25			33–75	

=== Cuadrangular Final ===
Ranking

Pos	Team	Pld	W	L	Pts	SPW	SPL	SPR	SW	SL	SR	Qualification
1	Universidad San Martín	3	3	0	9	225	109	2.064	9	0	MAX	2022–23 LNSV
2	Túpac Amaru	3	2	1	6	199	177	1.124	6	3	2.000	2022–23 LNSV
3	Sumak Selva	3	1	2	3	171	203	0.842	3	6	0.500	2022–23 LNSV
4	Los Brillantes	3	0	3	0	119	225	0.529	0	9	0.000	

==== Results ====
===== Round 1 =====
Date		Score		Set 1	Set 2	Set 3	Set 4	Set 5	Total	Report
22 Jul	Universidad San Martín	3–0	Los Brillantes	25–14	25–6	25–10			75–30	
22 Jul	Túpac Amaru	3–0	Sumak Selva	27–25	25–19	25–20			77–64	

===== Round 2 =====
Date		Score		Set 1	Set 2	Set 3	Set 4	Set 5	Total	Report
23 Jul	Universidad San Martín	3–0	Sumak Selva	25–18	25–3	25–11			75–32	
23 Jul	Túpac Amaru	3–0	Los Brillantes	25–8	25–14	25–16			75–38	

===== Round 3 =====
Date		Score		Set 1	Set 2	Set 3	Set 4	Set 5	Total	Report
24 Jul	Sumak Selva	3–0	Los Brillantes	25–17	25–18	25–16			75–51	
24 Jul	Universidad San Martín	3–0	Túpac Amaru	25–17	25–18	25–12			75–47	

== Second stage ==
=== Serie A ===
Ranking

Pos	Team	Pld	W	L	Pts	SPW	SPL	SPR	SW	SL	SR	Qualification
1	Regatas Lima	6	5	1	15	538	446	1.206	17	6	2.833	Semifinals
2	Alianza Lima	6	4	2	11	476	433	1.099	13	8	1.625	Semifinals
3	Géminis	6	2	4	6	496	557	0.890	9	15	0.600	Semifinals
4	Latino Amisa	6	1	5	4	443	517	0.857	6	16	0.375	Semifinals

==== Results ====
===== Round 1 =====
Date		Score		Set 1	Set 2	Set 3	Set 4	Set 5	Total	Report
1 Mar	Regatas Lima	3–2	Géminis	24–26	21–25	25–21	25–13	15–13	110–98	
3 Mar	Latino Amisa	0–3	Alianza Lima	9–25	16–25	19–25			44–75	

===== Round 2 =====
Date		Score		Set 1	Set 2	Set 3	Set 4	Set 5	Total	Report
5 Mar	Regatas Lima	3–0	Alianza Lima	25–20	25–18	25–17			75–55	
6 Mar	Latino Amisa	2–3	Géminis	23–25	25–22	22–25	27–25	13–15	44–75	

===== Round 3 =====
Date		Score		Set 1	Set 2	Set 3	Set 4	Set 5	Total	Report
8 Mar	Alianza Lima	1–3	Géminis	22–25	25–18	23–25	21–25		91–93	
9 Mar	Regatas Lima	3–0	Latino Amisa	25–22	25–18	25–19			75–59	

===== Round 4 =====
Date		Score		Set 1	Set 2	Set 3	Set 4	Set 5	Total	Report
12 Mar	Regatas Lima	3–0	Géminis	25–16	25–22	25–10			75–48	
13 Mar	Alianza Lima	3–0	Latino Amisa	25–21	25–15	25–17			75–53	

===== Round 5 =====
Date		Score		Set 1	Set 2	Set 3	Set 4	Set 5	Total	Report
15 Mar	Alianza Lima	3–2	Regatas Lima	16–25	25–23	23–25	25–22	15–10	104–105	
17 Mar	Géminis	1–3	Latino Amisa	25–20	22–25	18–25	17–25		82–95	

===== Round 6 =====
Date		Score		Set 1	Set 2	Set 3	Set 4	Set 5	Total	Report
19 Mar	Géminis	0–3	Alianza Lima	22–25	24–26	17–25			63–76	
20 Mar	Latino Amisa	1–3	Regatas Lima	22–25	25–23	18–25	17–25		82–98	

=== Serie B ===
Ranking

Pos	Team	Pld	W	L	Pts	SPW	SPL	SPR	SW	SL	SR
1	Rebaza Acosta	6	5	1	15	571	528	1.081	17	8	2.125
2	Circolo Sportivo Italiano	6	4	2	11	481	449	1.071	13	8	1.625
3	Jaamsa	6	3	3	10	478	430	1.112	12	10	1.200
4	Deportivo Alianza	6	0	6	0	364	487	0.747	2	18	0.111

==== Results ====
===== Round 1 =====
Date		Score		Set 1	Set 2	Set 3	Set 4	Set 5	Total	Report
1 Mar	Jaamsa	3–0	Deportivo Alianza	25–11	25–20	25–15			75–46	
3 Mar	Circolo Sportivo Italiano	3–2	Rebaza Acosta	25–21	29–27	23–25	20–25	23–21	120–119	

===== Round 2 =====
Date		Score		Set 1	Set 2	Set 3	Set 4	Set 5	Total	Report
5 Mar	Jaamsa	2–3	Rebaza Acosta	25–15	25–17	20–25	19–25	13–15	102–97	
6 Mar	Circolo Sportivo Italiano	3–0	Deportivo Alianza	25–20	25–21	25–11			75–52	

===== Round 3 =====
Date		Score		Set 1	Set 2	Set 3	Set 4	Set 5	Total	Report
8 Mar	Rebaza Acosta	3–1	Deportivo Alianza	20–25	25–22	25–12	25–18		95–77	
9 Mar	Jaamsa	0–3	Circolo Sportivo Italiano	15–25	20–25	17–25			52–75	

===== Round 4 =====
Date		Score		Set 1	Set 2	Set 3	Set 4	Set 5	Total	Report
12 Mar	Jaamsa	3–0	Deportivo Alianza	25–10	25–16	25–14			75–40	
13 Mar	Rebaza Acosta	3–0	Circolo Sportivo Italiano	25–18	25–20	25–19			75–57	

===== Round 5 =====
Date		Score		Set 1	Set 2	Set 3	Set 4	Set 5	Total	Report
15 Mar	Rebaza Acosta	3–1	Jaamsa	25–15	18–25	25–22	25–18		93–80	
17 Mar	Deportivo Alianza	0–3	Circolo Sportivo Italiano	17–25	20–25	20–25			57–75	

===== Round 6 =====
Date		Score		Set 1	Set 2	Set 3	Set 4	Set 5	Total	Report
19 Mar	Deportivo Alianza	1–3	Rebaza Acosta	25–15	18–25	25–22	25–18		93–80	
20 Mar	Circolo Sportivo Italiano	1–3	Jaamsa	15–25	25–19	18–25	21–25		79–94	

== Third stage ==
=== Semifinals ===
==== First leg ====
Date		Score		Set 1	Set 2	Set 3	Set 4	Set 5	Total	Report
26 Mar	Regatas Lima	3–0	Latino Amisa	25–22	25–20	25–14			75–56	
26 Mar	Alianza Lima	3–0	Géminis	25–20	25–21	25–13			75–54	

==== Second leg ====
Date		Score		Set 1	Set 2	Set 3	Set 4	Set 5	Total	Report
31 Mar	Latino Amisa	0–3	Regatas Lima	22–25	16–25	18–25			56–75	
31 Mar	Géminis	1–3	Alianza Lima	26–28	25–22	19–25	21–25		91–100	

== Fourth stage ==
=== Bronze Medal Matches ===
==== First leg ====
Date		Score		Set 1	Set 2	Set 3	Set 4	Set 5	Total	Report
7 Apr	Latino Amisa	1–3	Géminis	20–25	21–25	25–19	14–25		80–94	

==== Second leg ====
Date		Score		Set 1	Set 2	Set 3	Set 4	Set 5	Total	Report
10 Apr	Géminis	1–3	Latino Amisa	23–25	25–20	22–25	18–25		88–95	

==== Third leg ====
Date		Score		Set 1	Set 2	Set 3	Set 4	Set 5	Total	Report
13 Apr	Latino Amisa	2–3	Géminis	25–17	25–27	24–26	25–19	13–15	112–104	

=== Gold Medal Matches ===
==== First leg ====
Date		Score		Set 1	Set 2	Set 3	Set 4	Set 5	Total	Report
7 Apr	Regatas Lima	3–0	Alianza Lima	25–22	25–16	25–23			75–61	

==== Second leg ====
Date		Score		Set 1	Set 2	Set 3	Set 4	Set 5	Total	Report
10 Apr	Alianza Lima	1–3	Regatas Lima	25–22	20–25	16–25	20–25		81–97	

==== Third leg ====
Date		Score		Set 1	Set 2	Set 3	Set 4	Set 5	Total	Report
13 Apr	Regatas Lima	3–2	Alianza Lima	13–25	18–25	25–18	25–15	15–6	97–89	

== Final standing ==
Rank	Team
1st place, gold medalist(s)	Regatas Lima
2nd place, silver medalist(s)	Alianza Lima
3rd place, bronze medalist(s)	Géminis
4	Latino Amisa
5	Rebaza Acosta
6	Circolo Sportivo Italiano
7	Jaamsa
8	Deportivo Alianza
9	Deportivo Soan
10	Universidad San Martín

Team qualified for the 2022 South American Club Championship

2021–22 Liga Nacional Superior de Voleibol;

Regatas Lima
8th title

== Awards ==
=== Individual awards ===
- Most valuable player
  - (Peru) Andrea Sandoval (Géminis)
- Best scorer
  - (Peru) Andrea Sandoval (Géminis)
- Best spiker
  - (Peru) Brenda Lobatón (Alianza Lima)
- Best setter
  - (Russia) Anastasia Salina (Latino Amisa)
- Best receiver
  - (Peru) Esmeralda Sánchez (Alianza Lima)
- Best blocker
  - (United States) Lauren Sanders (Regatas Lima)
- Best server
  - (United States) Kelsi Hobbs (Latino Amisa)
- Best libero
  - (Peru) Miriam Patiño (Regatas Lima)
