= Bebé, Perdón =

Thalía song

Single by Thalía

from the album A Mucha Honra
- Released: 4 October 2023
- Genre: Regional Mexican
- Length: 3:00
- Label: Sony Latin
- Songwriters: Thalía Sodi, Jimmy Humilde, Edgar Rodríguez

Thalía singles chronology
"Mixtape Medley" (2023)	"Bebé, Perdón" (2023)	"Choro" (2023)

Music video
- "Bebé, Perdón" on YouTube

"Bebé, Perdón" ("Baby, Sorry") is a song by Mexican singer Thalía co-written by her for her upcoming twentieth studio album. It was released by Sony Music Latin as the album's lead single on October 4, 2023.

== Background and release ==
Thalía first performed the song when she was the special guest of the Consulate General of Mexico in New York at the celebration of National Independence Day, where she had the privilege of illuminating the emblematic Empire State Building with the colors of the Mexican flag. The song was officially released on October 4, 2023, along with its music video, marking Thalía's return to her Mexican music roots with a touch of melancholy The song also hits a new sub-genre of music called "Corridos Tumbados". The song reached the top spots on iTunes in countries like Mexico, Chile, and the Dominican Republic in its first week.

== Music video ==
The music video came out on the same day as the song was directed by Eduardo González, produced by GiantWeTrust, and filmed in a Californian desert. The video shows Thalia, surrounded by her musicians, narrating a tale of heartbreak filled with nostalgia as the sun sets and a gentle breeze carries each verse. The music video has success on YouTube reaching over 149,000 views in just a few hours, an accomplishment for a song of that genre nowadays. The exclusive premiere of this music video was made on the screens of MTV Live, MTVU, MTV Flow Latino and on the Paramount screens in Times Square.

== Charts ==
Chart (2023)	Peak position
Mexico Pop (Monitor Latino)	15
