= Psycho Bitch (disambiguation) =

"Psycho Bitch" is a song by Mexican singer Thalía.

Psycho Bitch may also refer to:

- "Psycho Bitch", a song trilogy by American rapper Tech N9ne:
  - "Psycho Bitch", from the album Anghellic, 2001
  - "Psycho Bitch II", from the album Killer, 2008
  - "Psycho Bitch III", from the album Special Effects, 2015
- "Psycho Bitch", a song by Lesley Roy from the album Unbeautiful, 2008
- Psycho Bitch, an EP by Smokin Jo, 2001
