= Ten Cuidao =

2020 song by Farina and Thalía

Single by Farina and Thalía
- English title: Be Careful
- Released: October 8, 2020
- Length: 2:54
- Label: Sony Latin

Farina singles chronology
"Estoy Soltera" (2020)	"Ten Cuidao" (2020)	"Tick Tock" (2020)

Thalía singles chronology
"Pa' La Cultura" (2020)	"Ten Cuidao" (2020)	"Tick Tock" (2020)

Music video
- "Ten Cuidao" on YouTube

"Ten Cuidao" (English: "Be Careful") is a song by Colombian singer Farina with Mexican singer Thalía. It was released by Sony Music on October 8, 2020.

== Background and release ==
The song along with the music video was officially released on October 8, 2020, as part of the three-episode web series Latin Music Queens, which stars both singers along with Sofía Reyes. This marked the second time the singers collaborated after releasing Estoy Soltera a few months prior in collaboration with Peruvian singer Leslie Shaw. Thalía said in an interview that "Ten Cuidao is what we say to that person who thinks that we are easy women to convince."

== Commercial performance ==
The song had airplay success in Bolivia peaking at number 17 in the general chart and 16 in the latino chart.

== Music video ==
Prior to the release of the video, Thalía shared a trailer for the video on her Instagram which showed her in a red suit and Farina in a blue suit about to make a deal with Farina asking "Are you ready?" to which Thalía replies "I was born ready!". The video shows the singers as the opposing red and purple queens in a live action game of chess. The video reached a half a million views just a few hours after its release. The video was directed by Cameron Busby who has also worked with other big stars such a Niall Horan and Wiz Khalifa.

== Charts ==
Chart performance for "Ten Cuidao"
Chart (2020)	Peak position
Bolivia (Monitor Latino)	17
