= Choro (song) =

Thalía song

Single by Thalía and Estilo Sin Límite

from the album A Mucha Honra
- Released: 30 November 2023
- Genre: Regional Mexican
- Length: 2:16
- Label: Sony Latin
- Songwriters: Thalía Sodi, Dania, Jimmy Humilde, Thomas Alexander Leavitt

Thalía singles chronology
"Bebé, Perdón" (2023)	"Choro" (2023)	"Troca" (2024)

Music video
- "Choro" on YouTube

"Choro" (Cry) is a song by Mexican singer Thalía and Estilo Sin Límite co-written by her for her upcoming twentieth studio album. It was released by Sony Music Latin as the album's second single on November 30, 2023, following the success of the album's first single which reached the top spots on iTunes in countries like Mexico, Chile, and the Dominican Republic in its first week.

== Background and release ==
The song was written by Thalía herself along with Dania from, Jimmy Humilde, and Thomas Alexander. The song was produced by Edgar Rodríguez whit Humilde serving as executive producer. The song's title is inspired by the popular Mexican language, which refers to an exaggerated person who uses his words to make people fall in love. This latest single narrates the freedom of the artists and their liberation from the chains of those arrogant men who seek to conquer them. The song is a mix of Regional Mexican music in the modern day style known as corrido tumbado. The song's lyrics are very empowering for women. The song was considered to be another way for Thalía to reinvent herself.

== Reception ==
Following the release of the song, it was received with humor in Chile due to the song's title having a different meaning in that country. Although in Mexico, the term “choro” is associated with talking a lot and in an exaggerated manner and in countries like Colombia and Perú the word means "thief", in Chilean territory it has a different connotation, colloquially referring to the female intimate area. Thalía was unaware of the word "choro" having that meaning in Chile and on December 5 2023 she released a video on her TikTok showing her reaction to the meaning of the word in different countries.

== Music video ==
The music video came out on the same day as the song and it reached over 55 thousand views in 14 hours. The music video tells the story of the protagonists, highlighting their differences, but showing how they unite in sisterhood to express their distrust towards any "choro." Directed and produced by Eduardo González, the video incorporates elements of Mexican culture and Chicano subculture through its chromatic narrative and setting.

== Charts ==
Chart (2023)	Peak position
Chile Popular (Monitor Latino)	4
