= Desamorfosis =

Studio album by Thalía
- Released: May 14, 2021
- Recorded: 2019–2021
- Genres: Pop; reggaeton; electronica; bachata
- Length: 39:35
- Label: Sony Music Latin

Thalía chronology
Viva Kids Vol. 2 (2020)	Desamorfosis (2021)	Thalía's Mixtape (2023)

Singles from Desamorfosis
- 1. "Ya Tú Me Conoces" Released: January 24, 2020; 2. "La Luz" Released: August 28, 2020; 3. "Tick Tock" Released: October 29, 2020; 4. "Mojito" Released: May 7, 2021; 5. "Eres Mio" Released: June 13, 2021; 6. "Cancelado" Released: August 19, 2021; 7. "No Te Vi" Released: October 15, 2021

Desamorfosis (stylized as desAMORfosis) is the eighteenth studio album by Mexican singer Thalía. It was released on May 14, 2021, by Sony Music Latin.

The title is a blend of the Spanish words desamor (heartbreak) and metamorfosis (metamorphosis), with an emphasis on amor (love).

== Production and release ==
The album was preceded by four singles including "Ya Tú Me Conoces" released on all digital platforms on January 24, 2020, as the lead single. It marks the second time that Thalía has collaborated with Ricky Montaner, who wrote her 2014 single "Por Lo Que Reste De Vida", the second single released to anticipate the album was La Luz, a duet with Myke Towers released on August 28. The third single released was "Tick Tock" in which she sings with Farina and Sofía Reyes that peaked #9 on Billboard's Latin Pop Digital Songs Sales.

On May 4, 2021, the singer announced the release of the album for the next day 14, in her Instagram page, suggesting that fans to reserve the album on their favorite digital platforms in order to be the first to listen it and have exclusive access to the "Universo desAMORfosis" website where they would find exclusive content and surprises. She also posted the album cover which she appear showing her body adorned with jewels and pearls in golden tones, in the center there is a dagger and a heart, while on her head has a very resplendent crown.

== Promotion ==
Thalía appeared on The Tonight Show Starring Jimmy Fallon on May 11, 2021, as a special musical guest to promote the album which included the premiere of the music video for the album's fourth single Mojito. A week later on May 18, 2021, Thalía appeared as a special guest on The Today Show to talk about the album and promote it some more.

== Track listing ==
Desamorfosis track listing
No.	Title	Writer(s)	Length
1.	"Mojito"	Thalía; Rafael Rodríguez; Daniel Rondón; Andrea Mangiamarchi	2:53
2.	"Eres Mío"	Luis Barrera Jr.; Édgar Barrera; Patrick Ingunza; Viviana Ochoa	2:00
3.	"Mal y Bien"	Thalía; Johan Espinosa; Andres Echavarría; Yoel Henríquez; Pablo Preciado	3:18
4.	"Bolsito Caro"	Thalía; Santiago Castaño; Espinosa; Echavarria; Daniel Valencia; Duvalier Torres; Jorge Villa; Douglas Tovar	2:22
5.	"No Te Vi" (with Maffio)	Thalía; Carlos Peralta; Andy Bauza; Andy Clay; Sabino Luis; Ricardo Garzozi; Alexia Valle	3:10
6.	"La Luz" (with Myke Towers)	Thalía; Alberto Meléndez; Manuel Lara; Marco Masis; Christopher Ramos; Maria Chiluiza; Michael Monge; Alejandro Borrero; Ivanni Rodríguez	2:02
7.	"Por Qué"	Thalía; Rafael Queiroz	2:22
8.	"Cancelado"	Thalía; Queiroz; Mercedes Pieretti	1:56
9.	"Secreto" (with Jhayco)	Thalía; Marcos Masis	2:00
10.	"Ya Tú Me Conoces" (with Mau y Ricky)	Édgar Barrera; Jon Leone; Camilo Echeverry; Ricardo Montaner; Mauricio Montaner; Luis O'Neill; Víctor Viera Moore	3:15
11.	"Tick Tock" (with Sofía Reyes and Fariana)	Thalía; Andy Clay; Farina Franco; Úrsula Piñeyro; Viviana Baptista; Santiago Castillo; Luigi Castillo; Daniel Rondón	2:51
12.	"Empecemos"	Thalía; Judith Buendía	3:06
13.	"Barrio"	Thalía; Jeffrey Penalva	4:02
14.	"Tu Boca (Bonus Track)" (with Banda MS de Sergio Lizárraga)	Thalía; Barrera; Horacio Palencia	3:18
Total length:			39:35

== Accolades ==
The album was nominated for Pop Album of the Year at Premios Lo Nuestro.

Year	Award	Category	Result
2022	Premios Lo Nuestro	Pop Album of the Year	Nominated
