= Ruido Blanco =

Live album by Soda Stereo
- Released: 1987
- Recorded: May–August 1987
- Venue: Argentina/Chile/Perú/Venezuela/Mexico
- Genre: New wave
- Length: 47:52
- Label: Sony Music; Columbia
- Producer: Gustavo Cerati, Zeta Bosio & Charly Alberti

Soda Stereo chronology
Signos (1986)	Ruido Blanco (1987)	Doble Vida (1988)

Professional ratings
Review scores
Source	Rating
AllMusic	3/5 stars

Ruido Blanco (Spanish for White Noise) is a live album recorded by the Argentine rock band Soda Stereo, released in 1987 and recorded on their "Signos" Latin American tour promoting their album Signos. It includes a unique track, "Vita-Set", consisting of two songs bonded by their initial chords. Frontman Gustavo Cerati started to hate the song after the tour and it was never played again.

The album's title is taken from a lyric in the song "Prófugos" (off the Signos album): Tus ojos nunca mentirán / pero ese ruido blanco / es una alarma en mis oídos. ("Your eyes will never lie / but that white noise / is an alarm in my ears.")

== Track listing ==
Vinyl Tracklist
No.	Title	Writer(s)	Length
1.	"Signos"	Gustavo Cerati	6:20
2.	"Juegos De Seducción"	Cerati	4:14
3.	"Persiana Americana"	Cerati, Jorge Daffunchio	5:38
4.	"Sobredosis De T.V."	Cerati	5:40
5.	"Final Caja Negra"	Cerati, Zeta Bosio, Charly Alberti	5:44
6.	"Cuando Pase El Temblor"	Cerati	5:00
7.	"Vita-Set: Te Hacen Falta Vitaminas / ¿Por Qué No Puedo Ser Del Jet-Set?"	Cerati, Bosio, Alberti	4:26
8.	"Prófugos"	Cerati, Alberti	6:04
Total length:			43:06

Cassette, CD Releases Tracklist
No.	Title	Writer(s)	Length
5.	"Estoy Azulado"	Cerati, Richard Coleman	4:18
6.	"Final Caja Negra"	Cerati, Zeta Bosio, Charly Alberti	5:44
7.	"Cuando Pase El Temblor"	Cerati	5:00
8.	"Vita-Set: Te Hacen Falta Vitaminas / ¿Por Qué No Puedo Ser Del Jet-Set?"	Cerati, Bosio, Alberti	4:26
9.	"Prófugos"	Cerati, Alberti	6:04
Total length:			47:24

== Personnel ==
Soda Stereo

- Gustavo Cerati: Guitars, vocals.
- Zeta Bosio: Bass guitar, acoustic guitar, backing vocals.
- Charly Alberti: Drums, percussion.

Additional personnel

- Daniel Sais: Keyboards, vocals.
- The Supremes (1984 group; Mónica Green, Melba Houston, Anita Robinson): Backup vocals.

== Certifications ==
Region	Certification	Certified units/sales
Argentina (CAPIF)	Platinum	60,000^{^}
Mexico (AMPROFON)	Gold	100,000^{‡}
^{^} Shipments figures based on certification alone.^{‡} Sales+streaming figures based on certification alone.
