= La Luz (Thalía and Myke Towers song) =

2020 single by Thalía

Single by Thalía and Myke Towers

from the album Desamorfosis
- Released: 28 August 2020
- Recorded: 2020
- Length: 2:02
- Label: Sony Latin
- Songwriters: Thalía; Alberto Meléndez; Manuel Lara; Marco Masis; Christopher Ramos; Maria Chiluiza; Michael Monge; Alejandro Borrero; Ivanni Rodríguez
- Producers: Tainy, Albert Hype, Manu Lara

Thalía singles chronology
"Estoy Soltera" (2020)	"La Luz" (2020)	"Pa' La Cultura" (2020)

Myke Towers singles chronology
"Caramelo (Remix)" (2020)	"La Luz" (2020)	"Me Gusta" (2020)

Music video
- "La Luz" on YouTube

"La Luz" (English: "The Light") is a song by Mexican singer Thalía and Puerto Rican rapper Myke Towers, from Thalía's seventeenth studio album Desamorfosis. It was released by Sony Music Latin on August 28, 2020.

== Background and release ==
The song was released on August 28, 2020 onto mainstream radio and all digital platforms. Thalía stated that she recorded the song thinking of her audience and how the song could raise their levels of positivism and happiness.

== Music video ==
The music video was released on the same day as the song. The video was directed by Ariel Danziger, filmed in New York and San Juan, and shows the singers in a rustic scenery full of neon lights and special effects. The video got over 95 thousand views in its first few hours.

== Charts ==
=== Weekly charts ===
Chart (2020)	Peak position
Chile Pop (Monitor Latino)	19
Dominican Republic Pop (Monitor Latino)	16
Mexico Pop (Monitor Latino)	11
Mexico (Billboard Espanol Airplay)	16
Puerto Rico Pop (Monitor Latino)	7
US Latin Pop Airplay (Billboard)	17

=== Year-end charts ===
Chart (2020)	Position
Puerto Rico Pop (Monitor Latino)	35
