= Cerquita De Mí =

2019 song by Patrick Romantik

Single by Patrick Romantik
- English title: A Little Close To Me
- Released: 15 February 2019
- Genre: Cumbia
- Length: 3:33
- Label: Sony Music
- Songwriter: Patrick Romantik

Patrick Romantik singles chronology
"Mi Suegra" (2018)	"Cerquita De Mí" (2019)	"Sedúcela" (2019)

Music video
- "Cerquita De Mí" on YouTube

"Cerquita De Mí (Remix)"

Single by Patrick Romantik and Leslie Shaw
- Released: 1 November 2019
- Genre: Cumbia, Reggaeton, Pop
- Length: 3:28
- Label: Sony Music
- Songwriter: Patrick Romantik

Leslie Shaw singles chronology
"Solterita De Oro" (2019)	"Cerquita De Mí (Remix)" (2019)	"Bombón" (2019)

Music video
- "Cerquita De Mí (Remix)" on YouTube

"Cerquita De Mí" (English: "A Little Close To Me") is the debut single by Peruvian singer Patrick Romantik. It was released by Sony Music as Romantik's first single as a main artist after being featured in the 2018 song Mi Suegra by Peruvian singer Maricarmen Marín. In November 2019 a remix version of the song was released featuring Peruvian singer Leslie Shaw.

== Background and release ==
The song was released by Sony Music on February 11, 2019. It received attention for being the debut single by Romantik for himself after writing and producing major hits for other artists such as Lindo Pero Bruto by Thalía, Duele El Corazón by Enrique Iglesias, and Mayores by Becky G. For the remix, Sony suggested that Romantik collaborated with a different artist but since he is good friends with Shaw and they are both signed to the same label he asked for her to be the one who he collaborated with for the remix. This version was released as a mother's day special in Perú.

== Music video ==
The music video was released on the same day as the song. It features Romantik at a party playing beer pong with his friends and then dancing while flirting with a girl. The Leslie Shaw urban remix music video came out on the same day as the song and it features Romantik and Shaw recording the song in the studio.

== Charts ==
=== Weekly charts ===
Chart (2020)	Peak position
Perú Pop (Monitor Latino)	4

=== Year-end charts ===
Chart (2020)	Position
Perú Pop (Monitor Latino)	24

Chart (2021)	Position
Perú Pop (Monitor Latino)	54
