= Mojito (Thalía song) =

Single by Thalía

from the album Desamorfosis
- Released: May 7, 2021
- Length: 2:54
- Label: Sony Latin
- Songwriters: Daniel Rondon; Rafael Rodriguez; Thalía; Elena Rose
- Producer: Rafael Rodriguez

Thalía singles chronology
"Felíz Navidad" (2020)	"Mojito" (2021)	"Eres Mío" (2021)

Music video
- "Mojito" on YouTube

Audio video
- "Mojito" on YouTube

"Mojito" is a song by Mexican singer Thalía. It was released by Sony Music on May 7, 2021, as the fourth single from Thalía's seventeenth studio album Desamorfosis. The song was released as a sneak peek for the album, which was released a week after the song.

== Background and release ==
The song along, with an audio video, was officially released as the fourth single from Desamorfosis on May 7, 2021. The sensual track that refers to the Cuban cocktail fuses various rhythms, from the strings of various Latin genres, to the most urban of the latest trends, using various analogies related to drinking to describe the relationship with her love interest. The song was considered a "good sneak peek from the album that was needed to start a good weekend".

== Commercial performance ==
The song entered the pop charts in the U.S., Puerto Rico, and the Dominican Republic.

== Live performances ==
Thalía performed the song for the first time as part of a medley with her songs "Piel Morena", "Amor a la Mexicana", "No Me Acuerdo", "¿A Quién Le Importa?", and "Arrasando" during Ellas y Su Musica, a special Latin Grammy event celebrating women that she hosted.

== Music video ==
Thalía appeared on The Tonight Show Starring Jimmy Fallon on May 11, 2021, as a special musical guest to promote her album and the song, which included the premiere of the music video. The video chronicles a sun-soaked romance between Thalía and a beachside bartender. After an initial encounter on the beach, the couple meet again at a nightclub and dance as Thalía sings. The video became available on YouTube at midnight after the show. It became a trending topic on social networks and sparked the #Mojitochallenge on TikTok where followers did the same dance as Thalía and uploaded it to the network where she would choose her favorite clips.

== Charts ==
=== Weekly charts ===
Chart (2021)	Peak position
Dominican Republic Pop (Monitor Latino)	16
Puerto Rico Pop (Monitor Latino)	9
US Latin Pop Airplay (Billboard)	18

=== Year-end charts ===
Chart (2021)	Position
Puerto Rico Pop (Monitor Latino)	29
