= Lo Siento Mucho =

Single by Río Roma and Thalía
- Released: February 24, 2020
- Length: 3:19
- Label: Sony Latin
- Songwriter: José Luis Roma

Río Roma singles chronology
| "Yo Te Prefiero A Tí" (2020) | "Lo Siento Mucho" (2020) | "Gracias Un Millón" (2020) |

Thalía singles chronology
| "Ya Tú Me Conoces" (2020) | "Lo Siento Mucho" (2020) | "Tímida" (2020) |

Music video
- "Lo Siento Mucho" on YouTube

"Lo Siento Mucho" (English: "I'm Very Sorry") is a song by Mexican duo Río Roma and singer Thalía. It was released by Sony Music Latin on February 28, 2020.

The song was a hit in Mexico where it was certified gold.

== Background and release ==
The song was released on February 28, 2020. The song was written by José Luis Roma who also composed several songs for Thalía's album Amore Mío in 2014 and since then has kept a close friendship with her.

== Music video ==
The music video for the song was released on the same day. The video features Río Roma and Thalía singing the song while a couple is going through rough times as their relationship ends.

== Charts ==
=== Weekly charts ===
| Chart (2020) | Peak position |
|---|---|
| Bolivia Latino (Monitor Latino) | 18 |
| Mexico (Monitor Latino) | 4 |
| Mexico Pop (Monitor Latino) | 1 |
| US Latin Pop Digital Song Sales (Billboard) | 10 |

=== Year-end charts ===
| Chart (2020) | Position |
|---|---|
| Costa Rica Latino (Monitor Latino) | 87 |
| Mexico Pop (Monitor Latino) | 37 |

== Certifications ==
| Region | Certification | Certified units/sales |
|---|---|---|
| Mexico (AMPROFON) | Gold | 30,000^{‡} |
^{‡} Sales+streaming figures based on certification alone.
