= Faldita =

2019 song by Leslie Shaw

Single by Leslie Shaw and Mau y Ricky

from the album Yo Soy Leslie Shaw
- English title: "Little Skirt"
- Released: 7 March 2019
- Genre: Reggaeton, Pop
- Length: 3:12
- Label: Sony Music
- Songwriters: Leslie Shaw; Andres Castro

Leslie Shaw singles chronology
"Ni Me Miras (Remix)" (2018)	"Faldita" (2019)	"Solterita De Oro" (2019)

Mau y Ricky singles chronology
"Aventura" (2018)	"Faldita" (2018)	"Anda Pal Carajo (APC)" (2019)

Music video
- "Faldita" on YouTube

"Faldita" (English: "Little Skirt") is a song by Peruvian singer Leslie Shaw with Venezuelan duo Mau y Ricky. It was released by Sony Music and was Shaw's first international release and as the lead single of her 2020 EP. In early 2020, the song was voted as the Best Latina collaboration with Mau y Ricky on a Billboard Magazine survey with over 50 percent of the votes. It samples CPR by CupcakKe.

== Live Performances ==
Leslie Shaw and Mau y Ricky performed the song at the Calle Ocho Music Festival in Miami on March 10, 2019. Leslie Shaw also performed the song on several television shows including Despierta America.

== Commercial performance ==
The song performed well being certified gold in Perú and a month later it went platinum in the country where it also quickly became trending topic on Spotify. The platinum certification was given to Shaw while she was opening for Maluma during his concert in Perú.

The song reached number 2 in Peru becoming Shaw's highest chart single in the country after a while and was eventually certified quadruple platinum there. The song also entered charts in Ecuador and Colombia becoming her first song to enter charts outside her native Perú and her most charted song until the release of Estoy Soltera in 2020.

== Music video ==
The music video for the song was released on March 7, 2019 on Leslie Shaw's Vevo channel. The video was filmed in Havana, Cuba and features Shaw dancing around town wearing different skirts. The video reached 50 million views in 6 months of its release.

== Charts ==
=== Weekly charts ===
Chart (2019)	Peak position
Colombia Pop (Monitor Latino)	16
Colombia (National-Report)	31
Ecuador (National-Report)	78
Perú (Monitor Latino)	2
Perú Pop (Monitor Latino)	1

=== Year-end charts ===
Chart (2019)	Position
Colombia Pop (Monitor Latino)	46
Perú (Monitor Latino)	8
Perú Pop (Monitor Latino)	2

Chart (2020)	Position
Perú Pop (Monitor Latino)	90

== Certifications and sales ==
Region	Certification
Perú	4× Platinum

== Awards and nominations ==
The song won Best Pop/Urban Song at the Premios Fama in 2019. It was also nominated for Hit of the Year at the Premios Luces in 2019.

Year	Awards Ceremony	Category	Result
2019	Premios Fama	Best Pop/Urban Song	Won
2019	Premios Luces	Hit of the Year	Nominated
