= Until My Mother-in-Law Separates Us =

- Theatrical release poster
- Directed by: Carlos Landeo
- Written by: Diego Varela
- Produced by: Varun Kumar Kapur
- Starring: Roger Del Águila; Carlos Álvarez; Giovanna Valcárcel
- Cinematography: Freddi Hernández
- Music by: X Dinero
- Production company: Star Films
- Release date: August 25, 2016
- Running time: 78 minutes
- Country: Peru
- Language: Spanish

Until My Mother-in-Law Separates Us (Spanish: Hasta que la suegra nos separe, lit. 'Until the mother-in-law do us part') is a 2016 Peruvian comedy film directed by Carlos Landeo and written by Diego Varela. It stars Roger Del Águila, Carlos Álvarez and Giovanna Valcárcel.

== Synopsis ==
Lucho and Jenny are a middle-class married couple who are expecting a child. Lucho works in a restaurant and is fired, being forced to live in his mother-in-law's house. Coexistence becomes impossible, and her mother-in-law is tremendously nosy. In the midst of all the fighting, he suffered a blow to the head and as a result he had a conversation with his deceased father-in-law, who convinced him that his mother-in-law killed him. Lucho tells this to his soccer friends and together they look for a thousand ways to make her confess.

== Cast ==
The actors participating in this film are:

- Carlos Álvarez
- Leslie Shaw
- Róger del Águila
- Giovanna Valcárcel
- Jesús Delaveaux
- Manolo Rojas
- Alonso Cano
- Cecilia Tosso
- Ramón García

== Release ==
Until My Mother-in-Law Separates Us was released in theaters on August 25, 2016. Later, it was released in Colombia, Ecuador and Bolivia.
