= Bombón (Leslie Shaw song) =

2019 song by Leslie Shaw

Single by Leslie Shaw

from the album Yo Soy Leslie Shaw
- Released: 21 November 2019
- Genre: Reggaeton, Pop
- Length: 3:13
- Label: Sony Music
- Songwriters: Paul Irizarry; Mike Thompson; Armando Lozano; Leslie Shaw; Luis Rangel; Roberto Bazail; Alan Matheus; Patricia Zavala
- Producers: Mike Thompson; Exel The Future; Alan Matheus; Rob Dymez; Echo

Leslie Shaw singles chronology
"Cerquita De Mí (Remix)" (2019)	"Bombón" (2019)	"Estoy Soltera" (2020)

Music video
- "Bombón" on YouTube

"Bombón" is a song by Peruvian singer Leslie Shaw. It was released by Sony Music and was Shaw's second single for her EP Yo Soy Leslie Shaw.

== Release and reception ==
The song was released as the second single from the EP. While not as internationally successful as the EP's first single, the song still had national success managing to make it into the top 10 in the pop charts in Perú. The song is distributed through the various means of digital reproduction under the Sony Music Latin label, and in the credits of the composition it has names such as: Luis Rangel, Paul F. Irizarry, Armando Lozano, Patricia Zavala, among others.

== Live performances ==
Leslie Shaw performed the song on several television shows in Perú in order to promote it. One of the most notable performances was in the Peruvian television show Cinescape. Leslie Shaw also performed the song on Hispanic television shows in the United States including Despierta America. Another performance was in collaboration with Cuban singer Nesty which became notable for the chemistry between the two singers.

== Music video ==
The music video for the song was filmed in New York and was released on the same day of the song. The video reached the third spot on YouTube trending videos in Perú just a few days after its release. The video was filmed in October 2019 just one day before the filming of the video for Shaw's single Estoy Soltera which was released on June 19, 2020.

== Charts ==
Chart (2019)	Peak position
Perú Pop (Monitor Latino)	8
