= Ya Tú Me Conoces =

2020 song by Thalía

Single by Thalía and Mau y Ricky

from the album Desamorfosis
- Released: January 24, 2020
- Length: 3:16
- Label: Sony Latin
- Songwriters: Edge; Jumbo "El Que Produce Solo"; Ricky Montaner; Mau Montaner; Jon Leone; O'Neill; Camilo

Thalía singles chronology
"Vikingo" (2019)	"Ya Tú Me Conoces" (2020)	"Lo Siento Mucho" (2020)

Mau y Ricky singles chronology
"Recuerdo" (2020)	"Ya Tú Me Conoces" (2020)	"Sigo Buscándote" (2020)

Music video
- "Ya Tú Me Conoces" on YouTube

"Ya Tú Me Conoces" (English: "You Already Know Me") is a song by Mexican singer Thalía and Venezuelan duo Mau y Ricky, from Thalía's seventeenth studio album Desamorfosis. It was released by Sony Music Latin on January 24, 2020.

== Background and release ==
"Ya Tú Me Conoces" was co-written by Mau y Ricky themselves as well as Colombian singer-songwriter Camilo. The song marks the second time that Thalía has collaborated with Ricky Montaner, who wrote her 2014 hit single "Por Lo Que Reste De Vida". The song was released on all digital platforms on January 24, 2020.

== Chart performance ==
The song entered several charts in Latin American countries as well as some U.S. Latin charts.

== Live performances ==
Thalía performed the song along with Mau y Ricky at Premio Lo Nuestro 2020, where she was also a co-host.

== Music video ==
The video for the single was released on the same day as the song. The video shows Thalía with Mau y Ricky dancing while wearing different bright colored outfits. The video was produced by 2 Wolves Film and it was directed by David Bóhorques.

== Charts ==
=== Weekly charts ===
Chart (2020)	Peak position
Bolivia (Monitor Latino)	12
Chile (Monitor Latino)	19
Dominican Republic Pop (Monitor Latino)	4
Ecuador (National-Report)	65
El Salvador (Monitor Latino)	19
Honduras Pop (Monitor Latino)	4
Mexico (Billboard Mexican Airplay)	34
Mexico (Billboard Espanol Airplay)	9
Mexico Pop (Monitor Latino)	9
Panama Pop (Monitor Latino)	4
Puerto Rico Pop (Monitor Latino)	12
US Latin Digital Songs Sales (Billboard)	15
US Latin Pop Airplay (Billboard)	30
Venezuela (Monitor Latino)	16

=== Year-end charts ===
Chart (2020)	Position
Argentina (Monitor Latino)	86
Bolivia Latino (Monitor Latino)	76
Chile (Monitor Latino)	97
Dominican Republic Pop (Monitor Latino)	33
Honduras Pop (Monitor Latino)	30
International Latino (Monitor Latino)	100
Mexico Pop (Monitor Latino)	79
Panama Pop (Monitor Latino)	27
Puerto Rico Pop (Monitor Latino)	55
Uruguay (Monitor Latino)	78
Venezuela Pop (Monitor Latino)	30

Chart (2021)	Position
Panama Pop (Monitor Latino)	96
