= Yo Soy Leslie Shaw =

EP by Leslie Shaw
- Released: June 19, 2020
- Genre: Pop, Reggaeton
- Length: 15:28
- Label: Sony Music Latin
- Producer: Alan Matheus, Alexander Palmer, Andrés Castro, DalePlay, Echo, Exel The Future, Frank Santofimio, Mantra, Mike Thompson & Rob Dymez

Leslie Shaw chronology
Destrozado y sin control (2010)	Yo Soy Leslie Shaw (2020)

Singles from Yo Soy Leslie Shaw
- 1. "Faldita" Released: March 7, 2019; 2. "Bombón" Released: November 21, 2019; 3. "Estoy Soltera" Released: June 19, 2020

Yo Soy Leslie Shaw is the first EP by the Peruvian singer Leslie Shaw, released on June 19, 2020. It's her first long form release since her 2010 debut album Destrozado y sin control and it's Shaw's first album to be released internationally.

== Background and release ==
The EP was released in 2020 simultaneously with the album's third single Estoy Soltera. The EP includes five songs including Shaw's first two international releases Faldita and Bombón. The EP includes collaborations with Thalía, Mau y Ricky, and Farina. Most songs were produced by Maffio. Shaw stated that with this EP people were going to get to know her 100% for it being very fun, rogue, and containing double meaning lyrics that would make people wanna dance.

Peruvian TV host Rebeca Escribens said she applauded Shaw for all her work on the album and accomplishments.

== Singles ==
Three song were released as singles in order to promote the EP. Each single entered the top 10 in Perú while Faldita and Estoy Soltera managed to have international success opening new markets for Shaw with the first one being certified quadruple platinum in Perú and latter being named The #1 Hot Song in the Monitor Latino general charts in Perú and Mexico. It also became Shaw's first single to enter the U.S. Billboard charts, joining Gian Marco, Yma Sumac, Susana Baca, Tony Succar, Juan Diego Flórez, Daniela Darcourt and Yahaira Plasencia as one of the few Peruvian artists to chart in that territory.

== Commercial performance ==
The EP became one of the best selling albums in Perú on the day of its release being among best selling on the digital sales chart in the country.

== Track listing ==
No.	Title	Length
1.	"Estoy Soltera" (with Thalía and Farina)	2:53
2.	"Otra Nota" (featuring Bulvoa)	2:54
3.	"Por Ahí No" (featuring Shellow Shaq)	3:15
4.	"Faldita" (with Mau y Ricky)	3:09
5.	"Bombón"	3:17
