= The Weakling's Handbook =

- Peruvian theatrical release poster
- Directed by: Carlos Landeo
- Written by: Adrián Ochoa
- Produced by: Marialuisa Hernández
- Starring: Manolo Rojas
- Cinematography: Freddi Hernández
- Music by: Alejandro Castañeda; Franco Lozano
- Production company: Star Films
- Distributed by: Star Films SAC
- Release date: April 12, 2018
- Running time: 100 minutes
- Country: Peru
- Language: Spanish

The Weakling's Handbook (Spanish: El manual del pisado, also known as Esclavo de mi esposa, lit. 'My wife's slave') is a 2018 Peruvian comedy film directed by Carlos Landeo and written by Adrián Ochoa. It stars Manolo Rojas accompanied by Natalia Málaga, Leslie Shaw, Sergio Galliani, Airam Galliani, Susan León, Mónica Domínguez and Carlos Thornton. It is about the odyssey of a man who wants to free himself from the control exerted by his wife. It premiered on April 12, 2018, in Peruvian theaters.

== Synopsis ==
Julio is the main salesman in his company, but in his personal life he is perceived as someone dominated. Tired of following orders, dealing with restrictions and the monotony of his routine, Julio decides to take control of his destiny and confront his greatest adversary: his wife.

== Cast ==
- Manolo Rojas as Julio
- Segio Galliani as Juan
- Amparo Brambilla as Carolina
- Airam Galliani as Claudia
- Carlos Thornton as Chuck Morris
- Susan León as Flor
- Leslie Shaw as Soledad
- Emilio Montero as Pablo
- Mariana Sábato as Alexander
- Hernán Romero as Julio's father-in-law
- Cecilia Tosso as Julio's mother-in-law
- Mónica Domínguez as Gaby
- Natalia Málaga as Herself
