= 2022–23 Liga Nacional Superior de Voleibol Femenino =

Liga Nacional Superior de Voleibol Femenino
- Association: FPV
- League: Liga Peruana de Vóley Femenino
- Sport: Volleyball
- Duration: January 17, 2023 to April 27, 2023
- Games: 107
- Teams: 12
- Relegated: Sumak Selva
- Finals champions: Regatas Lima (9th title)
- Runners-up: Alianza Lima

Seasons
- ← 2021–22 2023–24 →

The 2022–23 Liga Nacional Superior de Voleibol Femenino (Spanish for: 2022–23 Women's Senior National Volleyball League) or 2022–23 LNSV was the 21st official season of the Peruvian Volleyball League. Regatas Lima were crowned three-time champions after defeating Alianza Lima in the final.

== Difficult start ==
According to the 2022–2023 sports calendar of the Peruvian Volleyball Federation, published in Resolution No. 014-FPV-2022 on May 16, 2022, the 2022–23 Liga Nacional Superior de Voleibol Femenino was scheduled to begin on November 26, 2022, and conclude on May 14, 2023. However, the FPV postponed the start to December 7, a date on which the tournament also failed to kick off.

Subsequently, on December 6, 2022, Club Alianza Lima announced through its social media channels that the 2022–2023 LNSV would begin on December 17, 2022, and that “all matches would be played at the Villa El Salvador Sports Center.” This information was later confirmed by FPV president Gino Vegas on the Puro Vóley channel.

Later, the FPV officially presented the start of the league during a press conference held on December 12, 2022, in Lima, confirming a Saturday, December 17 kickoff with the matches Alianza Lima vs. Túpac Amaru (15:00 p.m.) and Latino Amisa vs. Deportivo Soan (17:00 p.m.). During the press conference, it was also announced that ticket prices would be S/ 15 and S/ 30, sold through the JoinnUs online ticketing platform. Following the rescheduling on January 25, the FPV stated that ticket prices for Saturday triple-headers would be S/ 20 and S/ 40.

== Political and social crisis ==
Unfortunately, on December 15, 2022, the Peruvian Volleyball Federation once again postponed the start of the 2022–2023 LNSV due to the severe political and social crisis in Peru following the failed self-coup attempt by Pedro Castillo Terrones and the rejection of Dina Boluarte as president. According to FPV Statement No. 03-2022, the new start date would be January 17, 2023.

After several postponements, the league finally kicked off on January 17 with the matches Regatas Lima vs. Sumak Selva (15:00 p.m.) and Alianza Lima vs. Túpac Amaru (17:00 p.m.). However, the FPV was once again forced to postpone six matches, due to widespread social protests against President Boluarte and the Peruvian Congress, particularly the so-called “Takeover of Lima” on January 19, which led the government to suspend all sporting activities nationwide.

Despite ongoing protests in Lima and other Peruvian cities, on Monday, January 23, the FPV announced that the tournament would resume on Tuesday, January 24, with the matches Géminis vs. San Martín (15:00 p.m.) and Latino Amisa vs. Deportivo Soan (17:00 p.m.).

Due to the latest postponement, the FPV released a rescheduled First Stage calendar on January 25 through the official LNSV Apuesta Total Facebook page. This rescheduling was primarily designed so that Sumak Selva would only need to travel to Lima twice for logistical and financial reasons. As a result, the Tarapoto-based team would play four matches in eight days in February (from the 5th to the 12th) and five matches in eight days in March (from the 4th to the 11th).

== Behind closed doors ==
As the political and social situation in Peru failed to improve, on February 1, 2023, the Federación Peruana de Voleibol announced, through Statement No. 002-DOD-FPV-2023, that starting February 2, LNSV 2022–2023 matches would continue “behind closed doors (without spectators) until the situation improves.” According to the FPV, the measure was lifted on February 3, allowing fans to return to the venue starting February 4.

In another episode reflecting disorganization and poor management, on March 16, 2023, the FPV announced, via Statement No. 004-2023-DOD/FPV, that “for reasons beyond our control, league matches will be played behind closed doors until further notice,” coinciding with the start of the Second Stage of the season. On March 20, the FPV confirmed that spectators would be allowed back starting March 21, after three matchdays without fans at the sports venue.

== Teams ==
=== Team changes ===
Promoted from
2022 Torneo Reclasificatorio
▲ Universidad San Martín (1st)
▲ Túpac Amaru (2nd)
▲ Sumak Selva (3rd)

=== Competing Teams ===
Club	Manager
Alianza Lima	(Brazil) Rafael Petry
Circolo Sportivo Italiano	(Peru) Walter Lung
Deportivo Alianza	(Peru) Arturo Gambini (First Stage: Round 1–8) (Peru) Pedro Quintana
Deportivo Soan	(Peru) Carlos Rivero
Géminis	(Cuba) Juan Carlos Gala
Jaamsa	(Peru) Martín Rodríguez
Latino Amisa	(South Korea) Byung-Tae Seo
Rebaza Acosta	(Peru) Heinz Garro
Regatas Lima	(Argentina) Horacio Bastit
Sumak Selva	(Peru) Maxwell Bartra
Túpac Amaru	(Peru) José Castillo
Universidad San Martín	(Brazil) Vinícius Gamino

== First stage ==
The first round is a Round-Robin system where all 12 teams will play once against the other 11.

Pool standing procedure

1. Match points
2. Numbers of matches won
3. Sets ratio
4. Points ratio

Match won 3–0 or 3–1: 3 match points for the winner, 0 match points for the loser
Match won 3–2: 2 match points for the winner, 1 match point for the loser

Ranking

Pos	Team	Pld	W	L	Pts	SPW	SPL	SPR	SW	SL	SR	Qualification
1	Regatas Lima	11	10	1	30	887	665	1.334	31	5	6.200	Second stage (Serie A / Serie B)
2	Alianza Lima	11	9	2	28	942	736	1.280	30	9	3.333	Second stage (Serie A / Serie B)
3	Universidad San Martín	11	9	2	27	927	815	1.137	29	12	2.417	Second stage (Serie A / Serie B)
4	Jaamsa	11	9	2	25	969	884	1.096	28	13	2.154	Second stage (Serie A / Serie B)
5	Géminis	11	7	4	21	939	858	1.094	25	17	1.471	Second stage (Serie A / Serie B)
6	Rebaza Acosta	11	5	6	16	990	940	1.053	22	22	1.000	Second stage (Serie A / Serie B)
7	Latino Amisa	11	5	6	14	874	886	0.986	18	21	0.857	Second stage (Serie A / Serie B)
8	Circolo Sportivo Italiano	11	4	7	12	924	946	0.977	19	22	0.864	Second stage (Serie A / Serie B)
9	Túpac Amaru	11	4	7	10	754	892	0.845	13	26	0.500	Serie C por la permanencia
10	Deportivo Soan	11	3	8	10	791	865	0.914	12	26	0.462	Serie C por la permanencia
11	Deportivo Alianza	11	1	10	3	566	802	0.706	3	30	0.100	Serie C por la permanencia
12	Sumak Selva	11	0	11	2	673	947	0.711	6	33	0.182	Serie C por la permanencia

=== Results ===
==== Round 1 ====
Date		Score		Set 1	Set 2	Set 3	Set 4	Set 5	Total	Report
17 Jan	Regatas Lima	3–0	Sumak Selva	25–15	25–11	25–16			75–42	
17 Jan	Alianza Lima	3–0	Túpac Amaru	25–17	25–6	25–19			75–42	
24 Jan	Géminis	3–2	Universidad San Martín	20–25	24–26	25–13	25–11	15–11	109–86	
24 Jan	Latino Amisa	3–0	Deportivo Soan	25–11	25–17	25–22			75–50	
26 Jan	Rebaza Acosta	3–0	Deportivo Alianza	25–15	25–13	25–12			75–40	
26 Jan	Circolo Sportivo Italiano	1–3	Jaamsa	22–25	25–19	22–25	28–30		97–99	

==== Round 2 ====
Date		Score		Set 1	Set 2	Set 3	Set 4	Set 5	Total	Report
28 Jan	Regatas Lima	3–1	Túpac Amaru	25–13	25–19	21–25	25–21		96–78	
28 Jan	Sumak Selva	0–3	Universidad San Martín	13–25	21–25	12–25			46–75	
29 Jan	Alianza Lima	3–0	Deportivo Soan	27–25	25–15	25–13			77–53	
29 Jan	Géminis	3–0	Deportivo Alianza	25–18	25–14	25–20			75–52	
31 Jan	Latino Amisa	0–3	Jaamsa	18–25	20–25	21–25			59–75	
31 Jan	Rebaza Acosta	3–1	Circolo Sportivo Italiano	28–30	25–9	25–21	25–21		103–81	

==== Round 3 ====
Date		Score		Set 1	Set 2	Set 3	Set 4	Set 5	Total	Report
4 Feb	Géminis	3–1	Circolo Sportivo Italiano	19–25	25–17	26–24	25–16		95–82	
5 Feb	Regatas Lima	3–0	Universidad San Martín	25–19	25–21	25–17			5–57	
5 Feb	Sumak Selva	0–3	Deportivo Alianza	13–25	20–25	18–25			51–75	
7 Feb	Latino Amisa	3–1	Rebaza Acosta	25–23	27–25	17–25	27–25		96–98	
7 Feb	Túpac Amaru	3–2	Deportivo Soan	23–25	25–19	17–25	25–16	21–19	111–104	
19 Feb	Alianza Lima	2–3	Jaamsa	25–19	22–25	29–31	25–18	16–18	117–111	

==== Round 4 ====
Date		Score		Set 1	Set 2	Set 3	Set 4	Set 5	Total	Report
2 Feb	Regatas Lima	3–0	Deportivo Soan	25–18	25–23	25–14			75–55	
2 Feb	Universidad San Martín	3–0	Deportivo Alianza	25–15	25–21	25–14			75–50	
4 Feb	Túpac Amaru	0–3	Jaamsa	16–25	15–25	28–30			59–80	
9 Feb	Sumak Selva	0–3	Circolo Sportivo Italiano	27–29	20–25	17–25			64–79	
14 Feb	Géminis	2–3	Latino Amisa	25–23	23–25	25–20	23–25	15–17	111–110	
14 Feb	Alianza Lima	3–1	Rebaza Acosta	25–21	21–25	25–12	25–15		96–73	

==== Round 5 ====
Date		Score		Set 1	Set 2	Set 3	Set 4	Set 5	Total	Report
9 Feb	Alianza Lima	3–0	Géminis	25–13	25–16	25–19			75–48	
11 Feb	Sumak Selva	0–3	Latino Amisa	17–25	16–25	23–25			56–75	
11 Feb	Regatas Lima	3–0	Deportivo Alianza	25–18	25–12	25–11			75–41	
11 Feb	Deportivo Soan	0–3	Jaamsa	16–25	22–25	21–25			59–75	
12 Feb	Universidad San Martín	3–1	Circolo Sportivo Italiano	25–20	13–25	25–23	25–15		88–83	
5 Mar	Túpac Amaru	0–3	Rebaza Acosta	17–25	20–25	15–25			52–75	

==== Round 6 ====
Date		Score		Set 1	Set 2	Set 3	Set 4	Set 5	Total	Report
16 Feb	Regatas Lima	3–0	Jaamsa	25–23	25–13	25–17			75–53	
16 Feb	Deportivo Alianza	0–3	Circolo Sportivo Italiano	23–25	22–25	20–25			65–75	
18 Feb	Deportivo Soan	1–3	Rebaza Acosta	25–21	22–25	21–25	25–27		93–98	
18 Feb	Universidad San Martín	3–1	Latino Amisa	23–25	25–21	25–20	25–9		98–75	
18 Feb	Túpac Amaru	0–3	Géminis	20–25	12–25	13–25			45–75	
7 Mar	Sumak Selva	0–3	Alianza Lima	8–25	14–25	17–25			39–75	

==== Round 7 ====
Date		Score		Set 1	Set 2	Set 3	Set 4	Set 5	Total	Report
12 Feb	Túpac Amaru	3–2	Sumak Selva	25–13	25–20	17–25	24–26	15–5	106–89	
19 Feb	Regatas Lima	3–1	Circolo Sportivo Italiano	27–25	25–8	24–26	25–19		101–78	
21 Feb	Deportivo Alianza	0–3	Latino Amisa	9–25	17–25	24–26			50–76	
21 Feb	Jaamsa	3–1	Rebaza Acosta	25–22	22–25	25–22	25–22		97–91	
23 Feb	Deportivo Soan	0–3	Géminis	16–25	22–25	16–25			54–75	
23 Feb	Universidad San Martín	3–1	Alianza Lima	25–21	25–20	13–25	25–20		88–86	

==== Round 8 ====
Date		Score		Set 1	Set 2	Set 3	Set 4	Set 5	Total	Report
25 Feb	Circolo Sportivo Italiano	3–1	Latino Amisa	25–20	24–26	25–22	25–23		99–91	
25 Feb	Regatas Lima	3–0	Rebaza Acosta	25–15	25–16	25–17			75–48	
26 Feb	Jaamsa	3–2	Géminis	23–25	25–19	25–21	25–27	15–13	113–105	
28 Feb	Deportivo Alianza	0–3	Alianza Lima	14–25	12–25	16–25			42–75	
2 Mar	Universidad San Martín	3–0	Túpac Amaru	25–18	25–11	25–10			75–39	
5 Mar	Deportivo Soan	3–1	Sumak Selva	25–18	22–25	25–15	25–13		97–71	

==== Round 9 ====
Date		Score		Set 1	Set 2	Set 3	Set 4	Set 5	Total	Report
25 Feb	Deportivo Alianza	0–3	Túpac Amaru	14–25	20–25	20–25			54–75	
26 Feb	Deportivo Soan	0–3	Universidad San Martín	18–25	15–25	21–25			54–75	
28 Feb	Regatas Lima	3–0	Latino Amisa	25–18	25–19	25–22			75–59	
2 Mar	Rebaza Acosta	2–3	Géminis	25–21	28–26	21–25	22–25	12–15	108–112	
4 Mar	Circolo Sportivo Italiano	1–3	Alianza Lima	23–25	25–20	19–25	19–25		86–95	
4 Mar	Jaamsa	3–1	Sumak Selva	25–14	25–11	26–28	25–16		101–69	

==== Round 10 ====
Date		Score		Set 1	Set 2	Set 3	Set 4	Set 5	Total	Report
4 Feb	Latino Amisa	0–3	Alianza Lima	22–25	23–25	19–25			64–75	
4 Mar	Regatas Lima	3–0	Géminis	25–21	25–20	25–17			75–58	
7 Mar	Jaamsa	1–3	Universidad San Martín	–	–	–			–	
9 Mar	Circolo Sportivo Italiano	3–0	Túpac Amaru	25–16	25–12	25–20			75–48	
9 Mar	Rebaza Acosta	3–2	Sumak Selva	25–13	26–28	22–25	25–12	15–10	113–88	
11 Mar	Deportivo Alianza	0–3	Deportivo Soan	10–25	16–25	18–25			44–75	

==== Round 11 ====
Date		Score		Set 1	Set 2	Set 3	Set 4	Set 5	Total	Report
11 Mar	Géminis	3–0	Sumak Selva	25–22	26–24	25–12			76–58	
11 Mar	Regatas Lima	1–3	Alianza Lima	22–25	20–25	25–21	23–25		90–96	
12 Mar	Rebaza Acosta	2–3	Universidad San Martín	22–25	25–22	23–25	25–23	13–15	108–110	
12 Mar	Latino Amisa	1–3	Túpac Amaru	21–25	25–27	25–22	23–25		94–99	
14 Mar	Circolo Sportivo Italiano	1–3	Deportivo Soan	25–21	22–25	24–26	18–25		89–97	
14 Mar	Jaamsa	3–0	Deportivo Alianza	25–20	25–13	25–20			75–53	

== Second stage ==
=== Serie A ===
Ranking

Pos	Team	Pld	W	L	Pts	SPW	SPL	SPR	SW	SL	SR	Qualification
1	Regatas Lima	13	12	1	34	1116	913	1.222	37	9	4.111	Semifinals
2	Jaamsa	13	8	5	24	1144	1129	1.013	29	22	1.318	Semifinals
3	Circolo Sportivo Italiano	13	4	9	11	1084	1169	0.927	19	31	0.613	
4	Géminis	13	3	10	10	1092	1191	0.917	17	35	0.486	

==== Results ====
===== Round 1 =====
Date		Score		Set 1	Set 2	Set 3	Set 4	Set 5	Total	Report
16 Mar	Regatas Lima	3–0	Circolo Sportivo Italiano	25–19	25–19	25–11			75–49	
19 Mar	Jaamsa	3–0	Géminis	25–16	25–19	25–19			75–54	

===== Round 2 =====
Date		Score		Set 1	Set 2	Set 3	Set 4	Set 5	Total	Report
23 Mar	Regatas Lima	3–2	Géminis	24–26	31–33	25–22	25–21	15–10	120–112	
28 Mar	Jaamsa	3–1	Circolo Sportivo Italiano	25–16	17–25	25–20	25–23		92–84	

===== Round 3 =====
Date		Score		Set 1	Set 2	Set 3	Set 4	Set 5	Total	Report
30 Mar	Regatas Lima	3–2	Jaamsa	25–18	22–25	25–16	16–25	15–9	103–93	
1 Apr	Géminis	1–3	Circolo Sportivo Italiano	20–25	22–25	25–21	22–25		89–96	

===== Round 4 =====
Date		Score		Set 1	Set 2	Set 3	Set 4	Set 5	Total	Report
2 Apr	Circolo Sportivo Italiano	0–3	Regatas Lima	22–25	24–26	16–25			62–76	
4 Apr	Géminis	0–3	Jaamsa	16–25	23–25	18–25			57–75	

===== Round 5 =====
Date		Score		Set 1	Set 2	Set 3	Set 4	Set 5	Total	Report
5 Apr	Géminis	1–3	Regatas Lima	15–25	26–28	25–23	16–25		82–101	
8 Apr	Circolo Sportivo Italiano	3–2	Jaamsa	25–23	25–27	25–20	22–25	15–10	112–105	

===== Round 6 =====
Date		Score		Set 1	Set 2	Set 3	Set 4	Set 5	Total	Report
9 Apr	Jaamsa	0–3	Regatas Lima	22–25	23–25	21–25			66–75	
11 Apr	Circolo Sportivo Italiano	3–0	Géminis	25–14	25–23	25–23			75–60	

=== Serie B ===
Ranking

Pos	Team	Pld	W	L	Pts	SPW	SPL	SPR	SW	SL	SR	Qualification
1	Alianza Lima	13	10	3	29	1151	1012	1.137	33	16	2.063	Semifinals
2	Universidad San Martín	13	9	4	28	1155	1114	1.037	31	21	1.476	Semifinals
3	Rebaza Acosta	13	3	10	12	1198	1242	0.965	22	33	0.667	
4	Latino Amisa	13	3	10	8	963	1133	0.850	13	34	0.382	

==== Results ====
===== Round 1 =====
Date		Score		Set 1	Set 2	Set 3	Set 4	Set 5	Total	Report
18 Mar	Alianza Lima	3–0	Latino Amisa	25–19	25–18	25–15			75–52	
21 Mar	Universidad San Martín	3–1	Rebaza Acosta	25–16	25–22	22–25	25–21		97–84	

===== Round 2 =====
Date		Score		Set 1	Set 2	Set 3	Set 4	Set 5	Total	Report
25 Mar	Alianza Lima	3–2	Rebaza Acosta	25–19	22–25	20–25	28–26	15–11	110–106	
28 Mar	Universidad San Martín	3–1	Latino Amisa	25–17	12–25	25–17	25–21		87–80	

===== Round 3 =====
Date		Score		Set 1	Set 2	Set 3	Set 4	Set 5	Total	Report
30 Mar	Alianza Lima	0–3	Universidad San Martín	26–28	19–25	22–25			67–78	
1 Apr	Rebaza Acosta	1–3	Latino Amisa	23–25	28–26	21–25	19–25		91–101	

===== Round 4 =====
Date		Score		Set 1	Set 2	Set 3	Set 4	Set 5	Total	Report
2 Apr	Latino Amisa	0–3	Alianza Lima	17–25	16–25	22–25			55–75	
4 Apr	Rebaza Acosta	3–2	Universidad San Martín	25–18	29–27	23–25	22–25	15–10	114–105	

===== Round 5 =====
Date		Score		Set 1	Set 2	Set 3	Set 4	Set 5	Total	Report
5 Apr	Rebaza Acosta	2–3	Alianza Lima	17–25	25–21	20–25	25–22	9–15	96–108	
8 Apr	Latino Amisa	1–3	Universidad San Martín	14–25	25–21	11–25	17–25		67–96	

===== Round 6 =====
Date		Score		Set 1	Set 2	Set 3	Set 4	Set 5	Total	Report
9 Apr	Universidad San Martín	0–3	Alianza Lima	24–26	21–25	20–25			65–76	
11 Apr	Latino Amisa	0–3	Rebaza Acosta	26–28	12–25	16–25			54–78	

=== Serie C por la permanencia ===
Ranking

Pos	Team	Pld	W	L	Pts	SPW	SPL	SPR	SW	SL	SR	Qualification
1	Túpac Amaru	6	5	1	13	564	505	1.117	17	9	1.889	
2	Deportivo Soan	6	4	2	13	573	476	1.204	16	9	1.778	
3	Deportivo Alianza	6	2	4	5	410	474	0.865	7	14	0.500	Qualification for Revalidación 2023
4	Sumak Selva	6	1	5	5	456	548	0.832	8	16	0.500	Relegation to 2023–24 LNIV

==== Results ====
===== Round 1 =====
Date		Score		Set 1	Set 2	Set 3	Set 4	Set 5	Total	Report
16 Mar	Túpac Amaru	3–0	Sumak Selva	25–11	25–15	25–17			75–43	
18 Mar	Deportivo Soan	3–0	Deportivo Alianza	25–14	25–17	25–18			75–49	

===== Round 2 =====
Date		Score		Set 1	Set 2	Set 3	Set 4	Set 5	Total	Report
19 Mar	Túpac Amaru	2–3	Deportivo Alianza	25–21	19–25	13–25	25–16	13–15	95–102	
21 Mar	Deportivo Soan	3–2	Sumak Selva	20–25	25–23	25–12	24–26	15–13	109–99	

===== Round 3 =====
Date		Score		Set 1	Set 2	Set 3	Set 4	Set 5	Total	Report
23 Mar	Deportivo Alianza	1–3	Sumak Selva	24–26	16–25	29–27	17–25		86–103	
25 Mar	Túpac Amaru	3–2	Deportivo Soan	25–23	18–25	15–25	27–25	17–15	102–113	

== Revalidación 2023 ==
Date		Score		Set 1	Set 2	Set 3	Set 4	Set 5	Total	Report
2 Apr	Deportivo Alianza	3–2	Molivoleibol	21–25	28–26	25–21	19–25	15–13	108–110	

== Third stage ==
=== Semifinals ===
==== First leg ====
Date		Score		Set 1	Set 2	Set 3	Set 4	Set 5	Total	Report
13 Apr	Regatas Lima	3–1	Universidad San Martín	25–20	25–16	17–25	25–15		92–76	
13 Apr	Jaamsa	1–3	Alianza Lima	22–25	25–22	19–25	9–25		75–97	

==== Second leg ====
Date		Score		Set 1	Set 2	Set 3	Set 4	Set 5	Total	Report
16 Apr	Universidad San Martín	1–3	Regatas Lima	10–25	18–25	25–23	14–25		67–98	
16 Apr	Alianza Lima	3–1	Jaamsa	25–23	13–25	25–23	25–19		88–90	

== Fourth stage ==
=== Bronze Medal Matches ===
==== First leg ====
Date		Score		Set 1	Set 2	Set 3	Set 4	Set 5	Total	Report
20 Apr	Universidad San Martín	3–1	Jaamsa	25–17	25–13	19–25	25–18		94–73	

==== Second leg ====
Date		Score		Set 1	Set 2	Set 3	Set 4	Set 5	Total	Report
23 Apr	Jaamsa	0–3	Universidad San Martín	18–25	16–25	18–25			52–75	

=== Gold Medal Matches ===
==== First leg ====
Date		Score		Set 1	Set 2	Set 3	Set 4	Set 5	Total	Report
20 Apr	Regatas Lima	3–1	Alianza Lima	21–25	25–22	25–18	25–23		96–88	

==== Second leg ====
Date		Score		Set 1	Set 2	Set 3	Set 4	Set 5	Total	Report
23 Apr	Alianza Lima	0–3	Regatas Lima	9–25	19–25	16–25			44–75	

==== Third leg ====
Date		Score		Set 1	Set 2	Set 3	Set 4	Set 5	Total	Report
25 Apr	Regatas Lima	1–3	Alianza Lima	25–19	22–25	22–25	24–26		93–95	

==== Fourth leg ====
Date		Score		Set 1	Set 2	Set 3	Set 4	Set 5	Total	Report
27 Apr	Alianza Lima	1–3	Regatas Lima	25–20	17–25	18–25	20–25		80–95	

== Final standing ==
Rank	Team
1st place, gold medalist(s)	Regatas Lima
2nd place, silver medalist(s)	Alianza Lima
3rd place, bronze medalist(s)	Universidad San Martín
4	Jaamsa
5	Rebaza Acosta
6	Circolo Sportivo Italiano
7	Géminis
8	Latino Amisa
9	Túpac Amaru
10	Deportivo Soan
11	Deportivo Alianza
12	Sumak Selva

Team qualified for the 2023 South American Club Championship
Team lost A1 category

2022–23 Liga Nacional Superior de Voleibol;

Regatas Lima
9th title

== Awards ==
=== Individual awards ===
- Most valuable player
  - (Peru) Karla Ortiz (Regatas Lima)
- Best scorer
  - (Argentina) Eliana Pérez (Universidad San Martín)
- Best spiker
  - (Peru) Karla Ortiz (Regatas Lima)
- Best setter
  - (Peru) Alexandra Muñoz (Regatas Lima)
- Best receiver
  - (Peru) Miriam Patiño (Regatas Lima)
- Best blocker
  - (Peru) Flavia Montes (Regatas Lima)
- Best server
  - (Peru) Ysabella Sánchez (Alianza Lima)
- Best libero
  - (Peru) Miriam Patiño (Regatas Lima)
