= Billboard Español =

Spanish version of the Billboard musical magazine

Billboard Español (formerly Billboard en Español) is an online Spanish-language counterpart to Billboard magazine which is shown on Telemundo. The site was started in 2007 to cater specifically to the Latin community.

The Spanish web site features exclusive Latin music charts in every genre, from Latin Tropical Airplay, Latin Pop Airplay, Latin Regional Mexican Airplay, and Latin Rhythm Airplay Chart. The focus of music charts ranges from the Top Latin Songs on the radio, to Top Latin Albums getting the most sales.

Billboard en Español offers music news and focus on Latin musicians, producers and industry professionals. It provides resources and biographies on Latin music stars like Juanes, Daddy Yankee, Enrique Iglesias, Shakira, Flex, Chayanne, and Gloria Trevi.

Billboard en Espanol also highlights music from emerging artists and covers new trends in music throughout Latin communities around the world. It provides in-depth coverage of Latin music while recognizing the music fans and professionals who speak Spanish. The site was relaunched in September 2022 as Billboard Español.

== See also ==
- Top Latin Songs
- Top Latin Albums
