= Destrozado y sin control =

Studio album by Shaw
- Released: May 7, 2010
- Genre: Pop rock
- Label: FMO Music Studio (Lima)
- Producer: Francisco Murias Ocampo

Shaw chronology
| Destrozado y sin control (2010) | Yo Soy Leslie Shaw (2020) |

Singles from Destrozado y sin control
- 1. "Destrozado y sin control" Released: May 9, 2010; 2. "Una vez más" Released: November 26, 2010

Destrozado y sin control is the first album by the Peruvian singer Shaw, launched in 2010. The singles "Destrozado y sin control" and "Una vez más" had rotation on MTV. Shaw participated in the Festival de Viña del Mar in the international category with her song "Destrozado y sin control" .

== Background and release ==
The album was released in 2010 as Shaw's debut as a solo artist. The album contains nine tracks in the genres of Rock, Ballad, and Electronic rhythms. The album was produced by Latin Grammy Award nominated producer Francisco Murias. On an interview with RPP Noticias, Shaw stated that she had been working on this album since the age of 16.

== Commercial performance ==
The album had success in Perú, causing Shaw to get recognition in the country and was selected to represent Perú at the Viña del Mar International Song Festival in 2011 where she performed Destrozado y sin control and ended up in second place. The song also entered the top 20 in the charts in Perú.

== Track listing ==
1. Destrozado y sin control
2. Juegos
3. Luz
4. Una vez más
5. Estúpida chica pop
6. Mientes
7. En Todo Momento
8. Ven
9. Don
