= A Mucha Honra =

Studio album by Thalía
- Released: April 26, 2024
- Recorded: 2023–2024
- Genre: Mexican regional music
- Label: Sony Music Latin

Thalía chronology
| Thalía's Mixtape (2023) | A Mucha Honra (2024) | Navidad Melancólica (2024) |

Singles from A Mucha Honra
- 1. "Bebé, Perdón" Released: October 4, 2023; 2. "Choro" Released: November 30, 2023; 3. "Troca" Released: March 8, 2024; 4. "Te Va a Doler" Released: April 25, 2024

A Mucha Honra is the twentieth studio album by Mexican singer and actress Thalía. It was released on April 26, 2024, under the Sony Music Latin label.

The album consists of 9 tracks and explores the Mexican regional genre, featuring various collaborations with artists such as Ángela Aguilar, Grupo Firme, and Estilo Sin Límite. It was co-produced by Thalía along with Jimmy Humilde and Edgar Rodríguez.

The album's title refers to her song "María la del Barrio" from 1995, which served as the theme song for the eponymous telenovela starring Thalía and Fernando Colunga.

== Background ==
In 1997, Thalía released "Amor a la Mexicana," her first song to incorporate a mix of Mexican regional music with pop. In an interview with Billboard Español, the artist pointed to this song as one of the reasons for recording this album.

"For me, singing about Mexico and singing the styles of our music has been a constant in my discography. If you look for songs, videos, and hits by Thalía that have a regional or Mexican sound, there are many songs, many projects, and the classic of my entire career is 'Amor a la Mexicana'," said the artist.

For this album, a new version of the song was recorded, which Thalía considered one of the best of the several she has had.

The album was first announced at the Billboard Latin Music Week 2023. Thalía attended the 2nd day of the event in an exclusive Premiere Party and, during the interview, also revealed the titles of other tracks from the album.

The album cover art was revealed during the artist's appearance on The Kelly Clarkson Show on February 15, 2024.

== Singles and promotion ==
On September 16, 2023, Thalía performed at Bryant Park in New York City, where she sang the then-unreleased song "Bebé, Perdón," which would later become the first single from the album. The song was released on October 4, 2023, on all digital platforms. Directed by Eduardo González, the music video for the track was released on the same day on the singer's official YouTube channel.

"Choro" was released as the second single on November 30, 2023. The track features the group Estilo Sin Limite.

"Troca," a collaboration with Ángela Aguilar, was released on March 8, 2024, in celebration of International Women's Day. The release of "Troca" is accompanied by an imaginative music video directed by Marlon Villar, transporting viewers to a captivating metaverse.

On April 25, 2024, Thalía performed at the Latin American Music Awards, where she premiered the song "Te Va a Doler" in its Deorro Remix version. Later that same day, the standard version in collaboration with Grupo Firme was published, with a video directed by Lalo the Giant and Abelardo Baez. The song became the album's biggest hit, reaching #1 on the US radios what was reflected in airplay Billboard charts.

Thalía also performed the song "Te Va a Doler" at the event "Concierto de Campeones" in Los Angeles on June 28, 2024. The performance was part of a pocket show that marked Thalía's return to the stage. The singer has not performed a full show since 2018 while promoting her "Valiente" album. The event was held for 6,000 people and the performance of the songs "Te Va a Doler", Desde Esa Noche and No Me Acuerdo were broadcast on the Univision channel on June 29.

"CanCún", "Silencio" and "Para Qué Celarme" served as promotional singles and gained official videos released during the month of May.

== Track listing ==
A Mucha Honra track listing
| No. | Title | Writer(s) | Length |
|---|---|---|---|
| 1. | "Bebé, Perdón" | Jimmy Humilde, Thomas Alexander Leavitt | 2:54 |
| 2. | "Choro" (Estilo Sin Límite) | Thalía, Dania Ivana Valenzuela Roman | 2:16 |
| 3. | "Te Va a Doler" (with Grupo Firme) | Johan Sebastián, Bautista Betancourt | 3:03 |
| 4. | "Troca" (with Ángela Aguilar) | Geovani Cabrera, Miguel Armenta, Roberto Laija "Tito Doble P", Roberto Zamudio Ramos | 2:27 |
| 5. | "Para Qué Celarme" | Roman | 3:05 |
| 6. | "Amor a la Mexicana" | Mario Pupparo | 3:05 |
| 7. | "Silencio" | Rodríguez | 2:32 |
| 8. | "CanCún" | Rodríguez | 2:42 |
| 9. | "Te Va A Doler (Deorro Remix)" | Betancourt | 3:14 |
| Total length: | | | 24:21 |

== Accolades ==
The album was nominated for Best Pop Album at the Premios Juventud.

| Year | Award | Category | Nominated | Result |
|---|---|---|---|---|
| 2025 | Premios Juventud | Best Pop Album | A Mucha Honra | Nominated |
