= Si Me Ves Con Alguien =

2018 song by Leslie Shaw

Single by Leslie Shaw
- English title: "If You See Me With Someone"
- Released: 2 March 2018
- Genre: Reggaeton, Pop
- Length: 3:26
- Label: Sony Music
- Songwriter: Leslie Shaw

Leslie Shaw singles chronology
"Volverte A Ver" (2017)	"Si Me Ves Con Alguien" (2018)	"Ni Me Miras (Remix)" (2018)

Music video
- "Si Me Ves Con Alguien" on YouTube

"Si Me Ves Con Alguien" (English: "If You See Me With Someone") is a song by Peruvian singer Leslie Shaw. It was released by Sony Music in 2018.

== Promotion ==
Leslie Shaw performed the song on several television shows in Perú and also toured throughout Latin America to promote the song.

== Music video ==
The music video for the song was released on March 2, 2018 on Leslie Shaw's Vevo channel. The video was features Shaw hanging out with her friends talking about an ex and then leaving to have a girls night out.

== Official versions and remixes ==
Remixes

1. Si Me Ves Con Alguien (Solo Version) - 3:26
2. Si Me Ves Con Alguien (Female Remix) feat. Ali Urban y Mia Mont - 3:33
3. Si Me Ves Con Alguien (Kapla & Miky Remix) feat. Kapla & Miky - 3:11

== Charts ==
Chart (2018)	Peak position
Perú (Monitor Latino)	16

=== Year-end charts ===
Chart (2018)	Position
Perú (Monitor Latino)	89

== Certifications and sales ==
Region	Certification
Perú	2× Platinum
