= Destrozado y sin control (song) =

Single by Shaw

from the album Destrozado y sin control
- Released: May 9, 2010
- Recorded: 2010; Peru
- Genre: Rock pop
- Length: 4:07
- Label: MO Music Studio
- Songwriter: Francisco Murias Ocampo
- Producer: Francisco Murias Ocampo

Shaw singles chronology
"Destrozado y sin control" (2010)	"Una vez más" (2010)

Music video
- "Destrozado Y Sin Control" on YouTube

"Destrozado y sin control" is the first single from the album of the same name by the Peruvian singer and model Shaw. The video was released on May 9, 2010 by MTV Latin America.

== Commercial performance ==
Being the debut single by Shaw, it launched her into stardom. It quickly entered the charts in Peru and began being played all over Latin America on MTV. The song entered the top 20 charts in Peru.

== Viña Del Mar Festival ==
In 2011, Shaw was chosen to represent Peru at the Festival de Viña del Mar where she chose this song for the international song competition. It was well received by the judges with Noel Schajris from Sin Bandera stating he thought it was one of, if not, the best of the competition. She made it all the way to the finals and ended up in second place.

== Charts ==
Chart (2010)	Peak position
Peru (UNIMPRO)	19
