= Natalia Málaga =

Peruvian volleyball player and coach

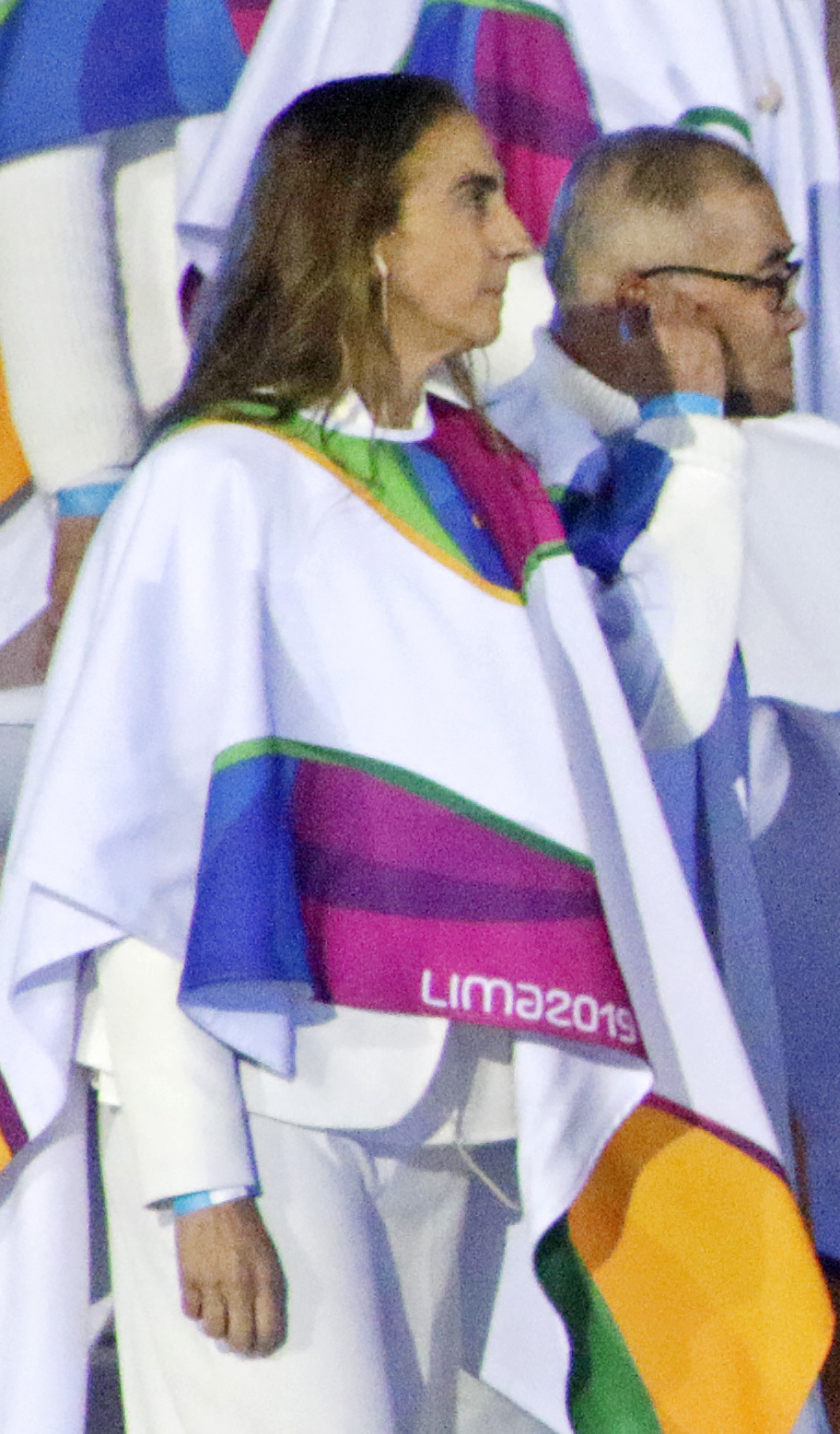
- Málaga in 2019

Personal information
- Full name: Natalia María Málaga Dibos
- Nickname: Madonna, Natalia Malamala, La madrastra, Doña Bárbara
- Born: 26 January 1964 (age 62); Lima, Peru
- Height: 1.70 m (5 ft 7 in)

Volleyball information
- Position: Outside hitter
- Number: 12

Career
Years	Teams
1990–1994; 1995–1996	Alianza Lima; Juventus Sipesa

National team
1980–2004	Peru
Medal record
Women's volleyball
Representing Peru
Olympic Games
Silver medal – second place	1988 Seoul	Team
World Championship
Silver medal – second place	1982 Peru
Bronze medal – third place	1986 Czechoslovakia	Team
Goodwill Games
Silver medal – second place	1986 Moscow
Pan American Games
Silver medal – second place	1987 Indianapolis	Team
Bronze medal – third place	1983 Caracas	Team
Bronze medal – third place	1991 Havana	Team
CSV South American Championship
Gold medal – first place	1983 São Paulo
Gold medal – first place	1985 Caracas
Gold medal – first place	1987 Punta del Este
Gold medal – first place	1989 Curitiba
Gold medal – first place	1993 Cusco
Silver medal – second place	1981 Santo André
Silver medal – second place	1991 São Paulo
Silver medal – second place	1997 Lima
Bronze medal – third place	1999 Valencia
Bronze medal – third place	2003 Bogota

Natalia María Málaga Dibos (born 26 January 1964), more commonly known as Natalia Málaga, is a former volleyball player and coach from Peru. Málaga participated in four Summer Olympics with the Peruvian women's national volleyball team. She placed sixth in 1980 in Moscow, fourth in 1984 in Los Angeles, won a silver medal in 1988 in Seoul, and placed eleventh in 2000 in Sydney.

While representing Peru, Málaga won a silver medal in the 1982 FIVB World Championship in Peru and a bronze medal in the 1986 FIVB World Championship in Czechoslovakia.

== Club volleyball ==
Málaga won the 1995 South American Club Championship gold medal playing with the Peruvian club Juventus Sipesa.

== Clubs ==
- Alianza Lima (1990–1994)
- Juventus Sipesa (1995–1996)

== Popular culture ==
Málaga had a minor role in the 2017 Peruvian film La paisana Jacinta en búsqueda de Wasaberto and appears as herself in the 2018 film El manual del pasado.
