= Estoy Soltera =

2020 song

Single by Leslie Shaw, Thalía, and Farina

from the album Yo Soy Leslie Shaw
- English title: I'm Single
- Released: June 19, 2020
- Length: 2:53
- Label: Sony Latin
- Songwriters: Leslie Shaw; Alexander Palmer; Antonio Cortes; Armando Lozano; Claudia Virginia Prieto; Farina; Frank Santofimio; Hector Montaner; Jorge Tavares; Thalía; Valdi Ramírez
- Producers: Alexander Palmer; Frank Santofimio

Leslie Shaw singles chronology
"Bombón" (2019)	"Estoy Soltera" (2020)	"Alguien Que Cuide De Mi" (2020)

Thalía singles chronology
"Mi No Cumpleaños" (2020)	"Estoy Soltera" (2020)	"La Luz" (2020)

Farina singles chronology
"Dale Cintura" (2020)	"Estoy Soltera" (2020)	"Ten Cuidao" (2020)

Music video
- "Estoy Soltera" on YouTube

"Estoy Soltera" (English: "I'm Single") is a song by Peruvian singer Leslie Shaw with Mexican singer Thalía and Colombian singer Farina. It was released by Sony Music on June 19, 2020, as the third single from Shaw's EP Yo Soy Leslie Shaw. This was Shaw's last single to be released under Sony Music.

== Release and reception ==
In early 2020, it had been rumored that Shaw had recorded a song with Thalía and Farina which was set to be a hit. Sometime later, Peruvian tv host Rodrigo "Peluchin" Gonzalez confirmed the song on his Instagram stories but neither the singers or record label confirmed. Shaw later announced the song on June 12, 2020 through her social media pages as the fifth and final song of her new EP which, along with the song, had been postponed due to the coronavirus pandemic. The song was released on June 19, 2020, the same day as Shaw's new EP. The song became a hit and was named The #1 Hot Song in the Monitor Latino general charts in Perú and Mexico.

Shaw began a promotional tour for the song which started through Mexico and Perú with hope to also expand to Colombia and the U.S. while the video also broke records in both Perú and the latin music market making her the first Peruvian artists to receive over a million views daily on a single video reaching over 9 million views in less than a week. The song topped the pop charts in Perú and Mexico. The song was an overnight hit and helped Leslie Shaw write a new page in both Peruvian and Latin music by bringing together three of the most active female exponents in the music industry in a purely urban theme. Despite the success of the song, Shaw still ended her contract with Sony Music a few months later making this her exit single from the record company before she moved to Miami where she signed with the independent label Vla Music Entertainment.

== Chart performance ==
The song entered charts in several countries and topped the pop charts in Perú and Mexico where it was placed on the 9th and 13th spot on the year end charts respectively.

== Music video ==
The music video for the song was released on the same day as the song on Shaw's Vevo channel. The video starts off with Shaw in a room singing by the windows while standing on top of some filing cabinets, then it moves to Thalía singing and dancing in a big room with chairs thrown all around. In both scenes the singers are wearing sexy lingerie then they switch to dresses and keep meet with Farina who is dancing in a bed by herself. The 3 women then move into a different room where they seduce a bunch of guys that are tied up wearing leather and/or latex in an S&M dungeon. The video reached over two million views in its first day. The video was also the #1 trending video in Perú and also reached the top 10 in countries like Colombia and Ecuador as well as the top 20 in Mexico and Argentina. In Perú it stayed the top trending video for 3 consecutive days and made Shaw the first, and currently only, Peruvian artist to surpass a million views in a day with a single video. The music video was filmed in Manhattan, directed by Katherine Diaz, and broke a record making Shaw the first Peruvian artist to surpass a million views in less than 24 hours with a single video. The video was filmed in October 2019 just one day after the filming of the video for Shaw's previous single Bombón and was originally set to be released in April 2020 along with the song.

== Charts ==
=== Weekly charts ===
Chart (2020)	Peak position
Bolivia Latino (Monitor Latino)	16
Honduras Pop (Monitor Latino)	5
Mexico (Monitor Latino)	11
Perú (Monitor Latino)	2
US Latin Pop Digital Song Sales (Billboard)	11
Venezuela Pop (Monitor Latino)	12

=== Year-end charts ===
Chart (2020)	Position
Honduras Pop (Monitor Latino)	37
Mexico (Monitor Latino)	86
Perú (Monitor Latino)	56

Chart (2021)	Position
Honduras Pop (Monitor Latino)	67

== Awards ==
The song won Hit of the Year at the Premios Luces in 2020.

Year	Awards Ceremony	Category	Result
2020	Premios Luces	Hit of the Year	Won
