= Persiana Americana =

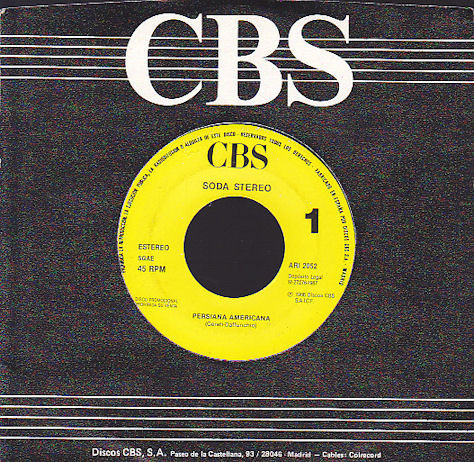
- Spanish single cover

Single by Soda Stereo

from the album Signos
- Released: 10 November 1986 or 3 November 1986
- Studio: Moebio Studios, Buenos Aires
- Genre: New wave
- Length: 4:54
- Label: CBS Records International
- Songwriter: Cerati–Daffunchio
- Producer: Mariano López

Persiana Americana (transl. American Curtain) is a song by Argentine rock band Soda Stereo that was released as a single and as the first track of the B side in their 1986 album Signos.

The song was composed by Gustavo Cerati along with help of film director Jorge Daffunchio. Cerati and Daffunchio met through a radio contest where the participants sent lyrics to musicians to include them in their next album. Cerati rejected the initial lyrics, as he thought they were too hard to musicalize. Daffunchio later sent Cerati more lyrics and organized meetings where they would finish Persiana Americana. Daffunchio final lyrics were made with inspiration of the films Body Double (1984) and Dressed To Kill (1980), making the song about a voyeur.

Persiana Americana was released as a single in 1987 with its B side being No Existes, other releases were made as a single sided single and as the B side to Sobredosis de TV.

American magazine Al Borde ranked it in 7th place in their list of the best 500 songs of Ibero-American rock. It was ranked 31st in Rolling Stone and MTV's Los 100 Hits del Rock Argentino from 2002.

== Composition ==
Persiana Americana was written by Gustavo Cerati and Jorge Daffunchio—a film director that worked in a high school— making it one of two songs in Signos which lyrics were made with help outside the band members, the other being En Camino. A base track for the song was made around the making of Nada Personal (1985). Cerati and Daffunchio met due to a radio contest—which Cerati participated in— organized by Tom Lupo on the radio station Del Plata. The contest consisted of listeners sending lyrics to various musicians who would musicalize the lyrics and include them in their next album. Daffunchio sent the lyrics to Cerati for a song called Cine Negro, which Cerati liked but rejected it as he thought it was complicated to ⁣musicalize it. Later, Daffunchio called Cerati to give him more songs and organized various meetings with him to make the lyrics for Persiana Americana. Daffunchio's original idea for the song was about a person that was looking through the curtains waiting for someone who wouldn't arrive, Cerati rejected this idea as he wanted more romantic. The final lyrics were written with inspiration by the films Body Double (1984) and Dressed to Kill (1980), making the song about a voyeur. Author Diego Giordano writes that these lyrics can be seen at the start of the song, in the lyric "Fuera de foco, Inalcanzable" (transl. Out of focus, Unreachable) which according to him is how the protagonist of the song prefers his Voyeuristic desire.

Persiana Americana's length is 4:54. Cultura Colectiva writes that the song features a British new wave vibe. The structure of the song: verse (A), bridge (B), and chorus (C), is played twice before the instrumental entr'acte (D), which splits the song in two. The second half does not begin with a repeat of the verse, but with a third bridge. The song is played in a tempo of 101 BPM, a time signature of 4/4 and with E minor as the key. Giordano praises the drumming work, calling it essential to the mix.

== Live performances ==
In 1987, while performing the song in the nightclub Highland Road, a balcony above the bar collapsed, killing five people and injuring a hundred. This happened due to the construction of the place. Musician and mime artist Manuel Wirzt, who was at the event, would later compose the song Nadie Sabía (transl. Nobody Knew) which lyrics reference the event.

== Release and reception ==
Persiana Americana was released as the first track of the B side and the fifth track in Signos, which was released on 10 November 1986 or in the 3rd. It was also released as a single in 1987, with the B side being No Existes. Other releases were made as a single sided single, and as the B side to Sobredosis de TV, a song from Soda Stereo's self-titled album.

American magazine Al Borde ranked it in 7th place in their list of the best 500 songs of Ibero-American rock. It was ranked 31st in Rolling Stone and MTV's Los 100 Hits del Rock Argentino from 2002. Iván Adaime of AllMusic wrote in a review that songs like Persiana Americana along with Signos and Prófugos helped Soda Stereo gain the possibility of conquering wider audiences. Daffunchio later said in an interview about the song that "The people turned ‘Persiana [Americana]’ into a success that no one imagined, not even Gustavo [Cerati]."

== Charts ==
Chart (1987)	Peak position
Perú (UNIMPRO)	1
Ecuador (SACIN)	4

Chart (2014)	Peak position
US Latin Digital Song Sales (Billboard)	30

== Certifications ==
Region	Certification	Certified units/sales
Mexico (AMPROFON)	Gold	30,000^{*}
^{*} Sales figures based on certification alone.

== Bibliography ==
- Giordano, Diego (2019). Uniendo fisuras (in Spanish). Ciudad Autónoma de Buenos Aires: Vademécum, La Edad de Oro. ISBN 978-987-45755-4-8.
- Fernández Bitar, Marcelo (2017). Soda Stereo: La biografía total [Soda Stereo: The Full Biography]. Sudamericana. ISBN 978-9500757706.
- Bosio, Zeta (1 May 2016). Yo conozco ese lugar [I know that place] (in Spanish). Grupo Planeta Spain. ISBN 978-950-49-5157-5.
