= Psycho Bitch =

Thalía song

Single by Thalía
- Released: 4 November 2022
- Genre: Latin pop; electropop; disco
- Length: 2:48
- Label: Sony Latin
- Songwriter: Thalía Sodi

Thalía singles chronology
"Baila Así" (2021)	"Psycho Bitch" (2022)	"Para No Verte Más" (2023)

Music video
- "Psycho B**tch" on YouTube

"Psycho Bitch" (stylized as "Psycho B**ch" on the main cover) is a self-penned song by Mexican singer Thalía, released by Sony Music Latin as a stand-alone single on November 4, 2022.

== Background and release ==
The song was released on November 4, 2022 along with its music video, marking Thalía's return to her pop music roots and topping the iTunes charts in Mexico, Argentina, Guatemala, Costa Rica, and the U.S. Latin area.

Thalía stated that she fell in love with the song from the first time she heard the music demo and decided to record it but when she heard the first version she didn't like how it turned out and decided to start the song from scratch and in 10 minutes she wrote the final lyrics to the song adding her style into it while telling people to call her a "Psycho Bitch".

Despite all this, the single's release was overshadowed by rumors that she would have insulted Shakira for her song "Monotonía." Thalía would later deny those claims at the press conference for the 23rd Annual Latin Grammy Awards and also by sharing WhatsApp messages between her and Shakira to show that they are actually friends.

== Music video ==
The music video was released on the same day as the song. The video opts for a night party aesthetic in dark areas illuminated by colored lights and a party atmosphere. The music video features Thalía dancing while on top of a giant disco ball and some backup dancers dress as dominatrixes with short black wigs which pay a tribute to her 1996 music video for her single "Gracias a Dios" where her character is a psycho. It was trending topic in different countries including the United States where it reached the 37th spot. The video reached a million views on YouTube and over 40,000 likes in just 5 days.

== Charts ==
Chart (2022)	Peak position
Guatemala (Monitor Latino)	14
Guatemala Pop (Monitor Latino)	8
Mexico (Monitor Latino)	19
Mexico Pop (Monitor Latino)	18
Puerto Rico (Monitor Latino)	20
Puerto Rico Pop (Monitor Latino)	5
US Latin Digital Song Sales (Billboard)	8
US Latin Pop Airplay (Billboard)	14

=== Year-end charts ===
Chart (2023)	Position
Puerto Rico Pop (Monitor Latino)	92
