= Fariana =

Colombian rapper and singer (born 1986)

- Born: Farina Pao Paucar Franco; 16 September 1986 (age 40); Medellín, Colombia
- Genres: Urbano; reggaetón; hip-hop; R&B
- Occupations: Singer; rapper; songwriter; actress
- Years active: 2005–present
- Labels: White Lion; Ritmo Records; Nena Fina; La Commission; Roc Nation Latin; Sony Latin
- Website: fariana.net (in Spanish)

Farina Pao Paucar Franco (born 16 September 1986) known professionally as Fariana, is a Colombian singer, rapper and songwriter. Starting her career in 2005, she is considered one of the pioneers of reggaeton in Colombia, being the first Colombian reggaetonera (female rapper). In 2017, she became the second Colombian artist signed to Jay-Z's Roc Nation subsidiary, Roc Nation Latin. She is currently managed by La Commission LLC.

Her hits include "El Caballito" (featuring Oro Solido), "Bendecido" (featuring El Alfa), "Así Así" (featuring Maluma), "A Fuego", "Trakatá" and "Las Nenas".

== Early years ==
In 2005, she became known in the TV singing competition show X-Factor (Colombia) where she obtained third place. That same year, she had her first commercial success on the radio with the song "Sólo con Palabras" (featuring Julio César Meza).

== Musical career ==
After a short hiatus, Farina returned to show business in 2011 as the main character of the Colombian series Tres Milagros. She was nominated for Best Colombian Actress and Revelation of the Year at the TVyNovelas Awards (Colombia). The show was broadcast in Panama, Venezuela, Ecuador, the Dominican Republic, and the United States. She also wrote the song "Milagros Cruz", which was later included on her second album, Del Odio Al Amor.

=== 2012 ===
In 2012, she released the album Del Odio Al Amor with 12 songs written by her and produced by DJ Largo, which included one of her biggest hits, "Pongan atención" and the promotional singles "Money" and "Soñar No Cuesta Nada".

=== 2013–2014 ===
In 2013, "Pongan Atención" made it into the top 10 of the Hot Rankings on Latinoamerican TV music channel HTV. Shortly after, she released "Pum Pum" featuring Ñengo Flow, which became a hit in 2014.

=== 2015 ===
In 2015, Farina released the song "Jala Jala" with Puerto Rican artist J Alvarez. In the music video, she showed her choreography skills. The same year, she was nominated as Best Female Artist at the Heat Latin Music Awards alongside Shakira and Gloria Trevi.

=== 2016 ===
Farina had her first music contract with the American label La Commission with singles such as "Si Ellos Supieran" (featuring Bryant Myers) and "Copas de Vino". For this new phase of her career, she worked with Wyclef Jean and released three songs with him: "Casanova", "Hendrix Remix", and "Party Started". Jean nominated her as Artist of Tomorrow for CBS and the Grammy Awards.

In 2017, Farina was signed to Jay-Z's Roc Nation subsidiary label, Roc Nation Latin. Romeo Santos, CEO of the Latin division of the company, stated: "I was very impressed with her style. I heard three songs, and I knew she had something special. I welcome Farina to the RocNation Latin family."

She released the single "Mejor Que Yo?", a reggaeton pop song produced by the duo A&X. The song made it to the top 10 on the urban charts in Colombia. The song also charted well in Peru, El Salvador, and Guatemala. She closed the year with the singles "Todo", "El Problema" and "Mucho Pa' Ti", which became one of her biggest solo hits of her career.

=== 2018–2020 ===
Fariana has performed at international events like Radio City Music Hall in New York City with J Balvin, Luis Fonsi, Zion & Lenox, Jowel & Randy, and Nacho; the SXSW in Austin, the Viña del Mar International Song Festival and was the opening act of Romeo Santos's concerts in Denver, Phoenix, Los Angeles, Monterrey, Mexico City, Lima, Buenos Aires, and Santiago de Chile.

After Fariana released 12 songs for streaming platforms only, Sony Music Latin announced Farina had been signed to the label on 27 May. The label's president, Nir Seroussi, said: "Fariana is a true superstar in the making. We've admired her from afar for quite some time, and we're thrilled to join forces to help take her career to new heights."

Under Sony Music, Fariana released the singles "Ego" and "Superarte", where she explored darker sounds and a greater influence of rap and R&B. In addition, Fariana began to gain prominence in the musical industry by participating on various songs featuring Latin artists such as Leslie Grace, Sech, Carlos Baute, Maluma, Fanny Lu, Sofia Reyes and Thalia. In January 2021, Romanian singer Inna's single "Read My Lips" (2020) featuring Fariana reached number ten on the Romanian Airplay 100 chart.

== Discography ==
=== Albums ===
Title	Album details	Refs
Del Odio Al Amor	Released: 2012; Label: Format:	
FloWres (with Arcángel)	Released: 2021; Label: Format:	
Underwater	Released: 2024; Label: Format:	

=== Singles ===
Year	Title	Refs
2005	"Sólo con Palabras" (ft. Julio César Meza)	
2006	"Regresa a Mi"	
2007	"¿Será?" (ft. Julio César Meza)	
2009	"Hasta el Final"	
2012	"Soñar no Cuesta Nada"	
2012	"Money"	
2012	"Soñar No Cuesta Nada (Official Remix)" (ft. Jowell & Randy)	
2012	"Pongan Atención"	
2013	"Ácido" (ft. Rayo y Toby)	
2013	"Pum Pum" (ft. Ñengo Flow)	
2014	"Apágame"	
2015	"Jala Jala" (ft. J Alvarez)	
2015	"Mari"	
2016	"Si Ellos Supieran" (ft. Bryant Myers)	
2016	"Copas de Vino"	
2017	"Todo"	
2017	"El Problema"	
2017	"Mejor Que Yo"	
2017	"Mucho Pa' Ti"	
2018	"Ego"	
2018	"Superarte" (ft. Miky Woodz)	
2019	"Perras Como Tú" (ft. Tokischa)	
2019	"Como Una Kardashian"	
2019	"Olvídame"	
2019	"Fariana" (ft. Blueface)	
2019	"Así Así" (ft. Maluma)	
2020	"Muy Mal" (ft. El Micha)	
2020	"Dale Cintura (Kuliki)" (ft. Steve Aoki, Darell, and Play N Skillz)	
2020	"A Fuego"	
2020	"Estoy Soltera" (with Leslie Shaw and Thalía)	
2020	"Ten Cuidao" (with Thalía)	
2020	"Tick Tock" (with Thalía and Sofía Reyes)	
2021	"La Boca" (ft. Arcangel)	
2021	"Las Nenas" (Natti Natasha, Farina, Cazzu, La Duraca)	
2022	"Flow Calle"	
2022	"La Hp" (Spotify Singles)	
2022	"La Torta"	
2022	"Bendecido" (ft. El Alfa)	
2022	"Fiesta" (ft. Ryan Castro)	
2022	"Adicta al Perreo"	
2024	"DORA" (with El Alfa)	
2024	"El Caballito" (with Oro Sólido)	
2024	"Cañonazo" (with Nath)	
2024	"Safari" (with Lion Fiah)	
2024	"5 Baby's" (with Kim Loaiza)	
2024	"Underwater"	

=== Songs as featured artist ===
Year	Title	Refs
2006	"Caliente" (Dj Buxxi ft. Farina)	
2009	"Vas a Extrañarme" (Pipe Calderón ft. Farina)	
2010	"Yo Soy De La Calle" (Shungu ft. Farina)	
2010	"Contigo" (Ron Bass ft. Farina)	
2010	"Perdiendo el Control" (Hety & Zambo ft. Farina)	
2010	"Quedate Conmigo – Echate Pa' ca" (Juachito ft. Farina)	
2016	"Imagínate" (Alex Roy ft. Farina)	
2016	"Hendrix Spanglish Remix" (Wyclef Jean ft. Farina, Bryant Myers & Anonimus)	
2017	"Party Started" (Wyclef Jean ft. Farina)	
2017	"Mari Remix" (Farina ft. Honorebel, El Micha & Pocho)	
2017	"Parcera" (Tomas the Latin Boy ft. Farina)	
2018	"Carbon Sport" (Lary Over, Farruko, Farina, Químico Ultra Mega)	
2018	"Bad Gyal" (Pipe Calderón ft. Farina)	
2018	"Caprichosa (Remix)" (Beatriz Luengo ft. Mala Rodriguez & Farina)	
2018	"Ojalá" (Sech ft. Farina y Mozart La Para)	
2018	"En Tu Colchón o El Mio" (Abraham Mateo ft. Farina)	
2018	"Otra Copa" (Play-N-Skillz, De La Ghetto, Farina)	
2019	"De Lunes a Jueves" (Leslie Grace, Farina)	
2019	"Compro Minutos" (Carlos Baute ft. Farina)	
2019	"Sentimientos Encontrados Remix" (J Álvarez ft. Farina, Lyanno, Rauw Alejandro & Andy Rivera)	
2019	"Alma Desnuda Remix" (Catalyna ft. Farina)	
2019	"Involucrado" (Andy Rivera ft. Farina)	
2019	"Te Quedaste Solo" (Fanny Lu, Farina)	
2019	"Puesto Pa' Ti" (Maluma ft. Farina)	
2020	"Dale Cintura (Kuliki)" (Darell, Farina, Play-N-Skillz, Steve Aoki, Kiko el Crazy, Toño Rosario)	
2020	"Whoppa" (Tinie Tempah ft. Sofia Reyes and Farina)	
2020	"Read My Lips" (Inna ft. Farina)	
2021	"Cuanto" (Duki ft. Lucho SSJ and Farina)	
2022	"Barbie Spotify Singles" (Rebecca ft. Dulce Maria, Mc Danny, Farina)	
2023	"Adicto" (Yandel and Farina)	
2024	"Cañonazo" (Nath and Farina)	
