= Leslie Shaw =

Peruvian model, singer, dancer and actress

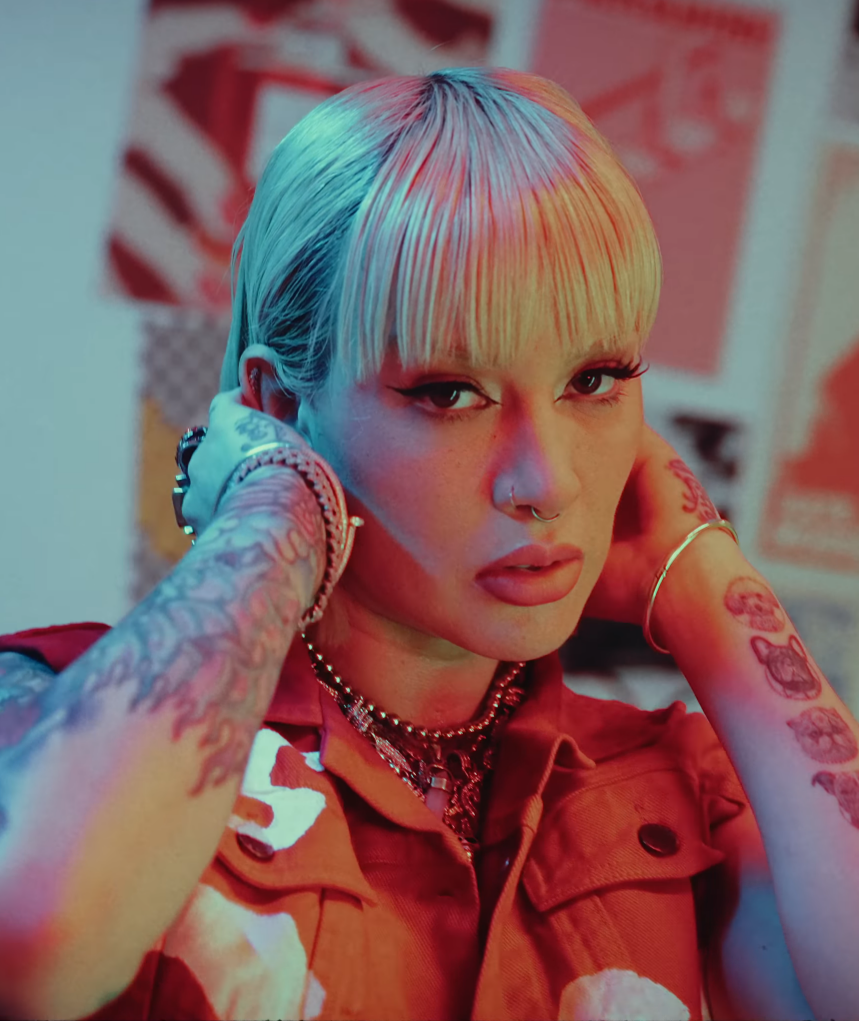
- Leslie Shaw in 2023
- Born: Leslie Ann Shaw Thays; 27 February 1989 (age 37); Lima, Peru
- Other name: Shaw
- Occupations: Singer; songwriter; actress; model; dancer
- Years active: 2008–present
- Height: 1.60 m (5 ft 3 in)
- Musical career
- Genres: Latin pop; reggaeton; pop rock
- Instruments: Vocals; guitar
- Years active: 2008–present
- Labels: Sony Perú; Sony Latin; VLA; Leslie Shaw
- Website: www.shaw.com.pe

Leslie Ann Shaw Thays (born 27 February 1989) is a Peruvian singer, songwriter, actress, model and dancer. She is best known for representing Peru in the Viña del Mar International Song Festival and being the Runner-up on the first season of El Gran Show 2011.

== Career ==
Leslie Shaw belonged to the Peruvian pop group Glow, who released their first single Signos in 2008 under Zona 25 records and they recorded several songs for their first album but Shaw wanted to record Rock music while the other members of the group wanted to record Pop music so she left the group.

In 2010 she decided to pursue a solo career and released her first album, Destrozado y sin control along with two videos, "Destrozado y sin control" and "Una vez más", both via MTV (Latin America).

In 2011 she represented Peru in the Viña del Mar International Song Festival. She made it all the way to the finals and got second place with her song Destrozado y sin control.

She participated as a celebrity constant in El Gran Show 2011, where she was the Runner-up of the season.

While she was on "El Gran Show", she took on the main role in the theater adaptation of the popular Peruvian TV soap opera, "Carmin".

Shaw is participated in the TV show Tu cara me suena (Perú) in the 2013–2014 season and ended up in third place.

In 2019 she performed at the 2019 Pan American Games opening ceremony alongside Luis Fonsi singing his hit song Échame la Culpa.

She has released one album, one EP, and has collaborated with international artists such as Thalía and Mau y Ricky. Her song Loco was certified gold in her native Perú while her songs Volverte A Ver and Decide went platinum, Si Me Ves Con Alguien went double platinum, and Faldita quadruple platinum. The Yo Soy Leslie Shaw EP includes collaborations with mayor artist such as Thalía, Mau y Ricky, and Farina. In July 2020 Billboard Magazine named her one of the top 15 new Peruvian artists to listen to.

In December 2020 she won the award for Best South Artist at the Premios Heat.

== Discography ==
Studio albums

- Destrozado y sin control (2010)

EPs

- Yo Soy Leslie Shaw (2020)
- Piscis, Vol. 1 (2023)

== Movies ==
Year	Title	Role
2013	Cementerio General	Victoria "Vicky"
2013	Rocanrol 68	Male
2015	Cementerio General 2	Victoria "Vicky"
2016	Until My Mother-in-Law Separates Us	Patty "La vendedora"
2017	Death Race 2050	Eve Rocket
2018	The Weakling's Handbook	Soledad

== Television ==
Year	Name	Role	Notes
2009	El show de los sueños: Reyes del show	Reinfocing Jean Paul Strauss	—
2011	Very Verano	Model	—
2011	El Gran Show 2011 (season 1)	Contestant "Heroine"	Runner-up
2011	El Gran Show (2011): Reyes del Show	Contestant "Heroine"	—
2013–2014	Tu cara me suena (Perú)	Contestant	Third Place

== Theater ==
Year	Name	Role	Notes
2011	Carmin	Fiorella Menchelli	Main Role

== Model ==
Leslie Shaw is a model of the agency Tempo Imagen, with experience in advertising photography and hosting events for major companies in Peru.

- Hair color: Blonde
- Eyes color: Green
- Height: 1.67 m
- Measurements:
