= Nowicki =

Nowicki (Polish pronunciation: [nɔˈvit͡ski]; feminine: Nowicka; plural: Nowiccy) is a Polish and Jewish surname. It comes from place names such as Nowice, which are derived from the Polish adjective nowy ("new").

Language	Masculine	Feminine
Polish	Nowicki	Nowicka
Belarusian (Romanization)	Навіцкі (Navicki, Navitski)	Навіцкая (Navickaja, Navitskaya, Navitskaia)
Czech, Slovak	Novický	Novická
Hungarian	Noviczky	Noviczkyné
Latvian	Novickis	Novicka
Lithuanian	Navickas, Navickis; Novickas, Novickis	Navickienė (married), Navickaitė, Navickytė (unmarried); Novickienė (married), Novickaitė, Novickytė (unmarried)
Romanian/Moldovan	Novițchi	
Russian (Romanization)	Новицкий (Novitskiy, Novitskii, Novickij, Novitsky, Novitski )	Новицкая (Novitskaya, Novitskaia, Novickaja)
Ukrainian (Romanization)	Новицький (Novitskyi, Novitskyy, Novitsky, Novickyj)	Новицька (Novitska, Novicka)
Other	Nowitzki, Nowitzky, Nowizki, Novicki	

== People ==
=== Nowicki ===
- Andrzej Nowicki (philosopher) (1919–2011), Polish philosopher, poet, and diplomat
- Andrzej Nowicki (writer) (1909–1986), Polish poet
- Bartosz Nowicki (born 1984), Polish athlete
- Dolores Ashcroft-Nowicki (born 1929), British occult author
- Douglas Robert Nowicki (1945–2024), American Benedictine abbot and priest
- Franciszek Nowicki (1864–1935), Polish poet and socialist activist
- Henryk Nowicki (1902–1969), known as Jerzy Zawieyski, Polish writer and activist
- Jan Nowicki (1939–2022), Polish actor
- Janet Nowicki (born 1953), American figure skater
- Jerzy Nowicki (1933–2013), Polish sport shooter
- Maciej Nowicki (born 1941), Polish politician
- Matthew Nowicki (1910–1950), Polish architect
- Maksymilian Nowicki (1826–1890), Polish zoologist
- Mieczysław Nowicki (born 1951), Polish road bicycle racer
- Tadeusz Nowicki (tennis) (born 1946), Polish tennis player
- Wojciech Nowicki (born 1989), Polish athlete

=== Nowicka ===
- Danuta Nowicka (born 1951), Polish politician
- Joanna Nowicka (born 1966), Polish archer
- Julia Nowicka (born 1998), Polish volleyball player
- Katarzyna Nowicka (born 1974), known as Novika, Polish vocalist
- Marta Nowicka, Polish-British interior architect
- Patrycja Nowicka (born 1998), Polish vocalist
- Stanisława Nowicka (1905–1990), Polish dancer
- Wanda Nowicka (born 1956), Polish politician and activist
