= Eda Erdem =

Turkish volleyball player (born 1987)

- Eda Erdem in 2026.

Personal information
- Full name: Eda Erdem Dündar
- Nationality: (Turkey) Turkish
- Born: Eda Erdem; 22 June 1987 (age 39); Istanbul, Turkey
- Height: 188 cm (6 ft 2 in)
- Weight: 73 kg (161 lb)
- Spike: 315 cm (124 in)
- Block: 302 cm (119 in)

Volleyball information
- Position: Middle blocker
- Current club: (Turkey) Fenerbahçe
- Number: 14 (national team), 14 (club)

Career
Years	Teams
2004–2008; 2008–	(Turkey) Beşiktaş (Turkey) Fenerbahçe

National team
2005–	Turkey
Medal record
Women's volleyball
Representing Turkey
FIVB World Championship
Silver medal – second place	2025 Thailand	Team
FIVB Nations League
Gold medal – first place	2023 Arlington	Team
Silver medal – second place	2018 Nanjing	Team
Bronze medal – third place	2021 Rimini	Team
World Grand Prix
Bronze medal – third place	2012 Ningbo	Team
European Championships
Gold medal – first place	2023 Belgium/Estonia/Germany/Italy	Team
Gold medal – first place	2026 Azerbaijan/Czech Republic/Sweden/Turkey	Team
Silver medal – second place	2019 Hungary/Poland/Slovakia/Turkey	Team
Bronze medal – third place	2011 Italy/Serbia	Team
Bronze medal – third place	2017 Azerbaijan/Georgia	Team
Bronze medal – third place	2021 Serbia/Bulgaria/Croatia/Romania	Team
European League
Silver medal – second place	2009 Kayseri	Team
Silver medal – second place	2011 Istanbul	Team
Bronze medal – third place	2010 Ankara	Team
Mediterranean Games
Gold medal – first place	2005 Almeria	Team

Eda Erdem Dündar (pronounced [ɛdɑː æɾ̞dæm ˈdyndɑɾ̞̊], born Eda Erdem; 22 June 1987) is a Turkish professional volleyball player. She currently plays for both Fenerbahçe SK and the national team and is the captain of both teams. Eda Erdem has been playing for Fenerbahçe since 2008.

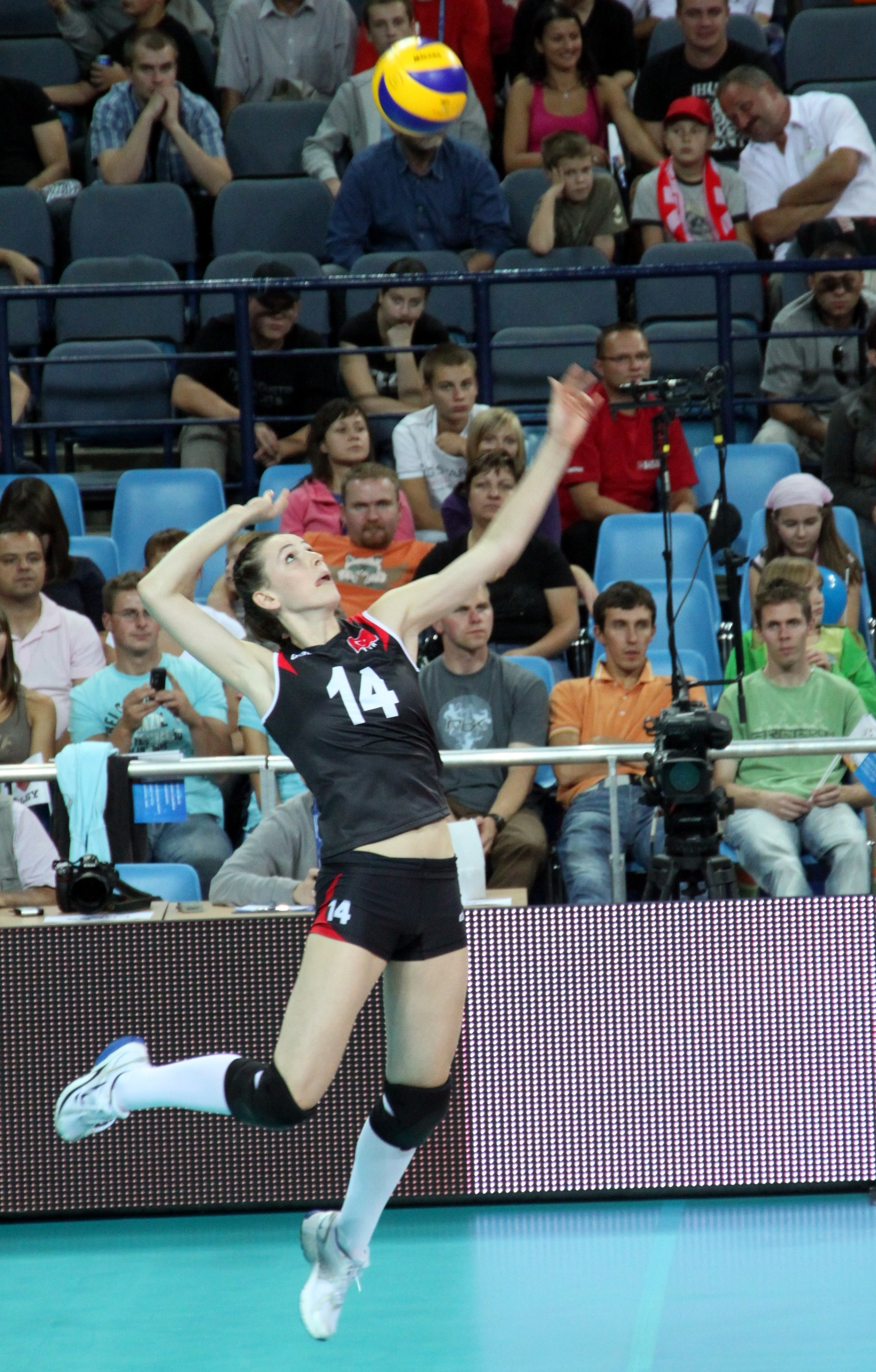
Serving in national team

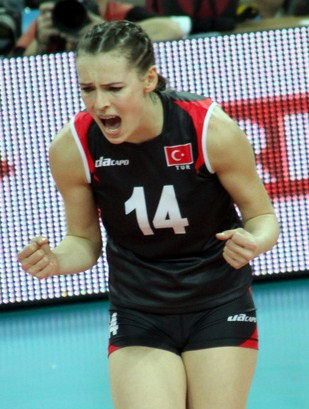
Celebrating points

== Career ==
She began her career in the Beşiktaş youth academy in 2000. It didn't take long for her talent to shine through, and in 2004, she earned a spot on the senior team. After four seasons with Beşiktaş, where she served as captain in her final two seasons, Erdem made a pivotal move in 2008 when she joined the prestigious Fenerbahçe.

With Fenerbahçe, she was part of the club's first professional league championship on 2008-09 season. She won three seasons in a row by 2008–09, 2009–10 and 2010–11.

In Doha, Qatar, Eda won the 2010 FIVB World Club Championship, playing with Fenerbahçe and earned the Best Server award.

In Baku, Azerbaijan, she won gold medal at the 2011–12 CEV Champions League with Fenerbahçe.

She played with Fenerbahçe in the 2012 FIVB Club World Championship held in Doha and helped her team to win the bronze medal after defeating Puerto Rico's Lancheras de Cataño 3–0. She also won bronze medal in 2021 FIVB Club World Championship.

In Montichiari, Italy, at the 2015–16 CEV Champions League she won the bronze medal after defeating Russia's Dynamo Kazan 3–1 and won the Best Middle Blocker award. She also won silver medal at the CEV Champions League in 2009-10 and won bronze medal in 2018-19, 2021-22, 2022-23 and 2023-24 seasons.

=== International ===
Since 2005, she has played more than 300 games for the Turkish national team.

She won the Best Blocker award at the European League in 2010 and won the Best Server award at the 2011 European League.

She also won Best Middle Blocker award at the European Championship in 2015, 2017, 2019 and 2021 and at the FIVB Nations League in 2018 and 2021.

On 9 July 2024, the roster of Filenin Sultanları for the upcoming Paris 2024 Olympic Games has been revealed and Eda Erdem to captain in third Olympic appearance.

She took some time off in the summer of 2025, and returned for the 2025 World Championship. Türkiye finishes second after a 3-2 loss to Italy. Eda was also awarded best Middle Blocker of the tournament.

== Awards ==
=== Clubs ===
Beşiktaş

- Turkish Women's Volleyball League: (bronze) 2005-06

Fenerbahçe

- FIVB Club World Championship: (gold) 2010 (bronze) 2012, 2021
- CEV Champions League: (gold) 2011-12 (silver) 2009-10 (bronze) 2010-11, 2015-16, 2018-19, 2021-22, 2022-23, 2023-24
- CEV Cup: (gold) 2013-14
- Turkish Women's Volleyball League: (gold) 2008-09, 2009–10, 2010–11, 2014-15, 2016-17, 2022-23, 2023-24 (silver) 2006-07, 2007–08, 2013-14, 2015–16, 2020-21, 2021-22 (bronze) 2011–12, 2012-13, 2017-18, 2018-19
- Turkish Cup: (gold) 2009-10, 2014–15, 2016–17, 2023–24, 2024-25 (silver) 2008-09, 2013–14, 2018–19, 2021–22, 2022-23
- Turkish Super Cup: (gold) 2009, 2010, 2015, 2022, 2024, 2025 (silver) 2011, 2014, 2017, 2023

=== National team ===
- FIVB World Championship: (silver) 2025
- FIVB Volleyball World Grand Prix: (bronze) 2012
- FIVB Nations League: (gold) 2023 (silver) 2018 (bronze) 2021
- European Championship: (gold) 2023, 2026 (silver) 2019 (bronze) 2011, 2017, 2021
- European Volleyball League: (silver) 2009, 2011 (bronze) 2010
- Mediterranean Games: (gold) 2005

=== Individuals ===
Club

- 2005–06 Turkish Volleyball League "Best Middle Blocker"
- 2009 Turkish Supercup "Most Valuable Player"
- 2010 FIVB World Club Championship "Best Server"
- 2010–11 Turkish Volleyball League "Best Spiker"
- 2010–11 Turkish Volleyball League 'Best Attacking Player"
- 2013–14 Turkish Volleyball League "Best Middle Blocker"
- 2015 Turkish Cup 'Best Attacking Player"
- 2015–16 CEV Women's Champions League "Best Middle Blockers"
- 2015–16 Turkish Volleyball League "Best Middle Blocker"
- 2016–17 Turkish Volleyball League "Best Middle Blocker"
- 2016–17 Turkish Volleyball League Finals "Best Middle Blocker"
- 2016–17 Turkish Volleyball League Finals "Best Blocker"
- 2017 Turkish Cup "MVP"
- 2017 Turkish Cup 'Best Attacking Player"
- 2018–19 Turkish Volleyball League "Best Middle Blocker"
- 2018–19 Turkish Volleyball League 'Best Attacking Player"
- 2019–20 Turkish Volleyball League "Best Middle Blocker"
- 2020–21 Turkish Volleyball League "Best Middle Blocker"
- 2021–22 CEV Women's Champions League "Best Middle Blockers"
- 2021–22 Turkish Volleyball League "Best Middle Blocker"
- 2021–22 Turkish Volleyball League "Best Blocker"
- 2022 Turkish Cup 'Best Attacking Player"
- 2022–23 CEV Women's Champions League "Best Middle Blockers"
- 2022–23 Turkish Volleyball League "Best Middle Blocker"
- 2023–24 CEV Women's Champions League "Best Middle Blockers"
- 2023–24 Turkish Volleyball League "Best Middle Blocker"

National team

- 2004 U20 European Championship "Best Blockers"
- 2010 European League "Best Blocker"
- 2011 European League "Best Server"
- 2015 European Championship "Best Middle Blockers"
- 2017 European Championship "Best Middle Blocker"
- 2017 European Championship "Best Blocker"
- 2018 Nations League "Best Middle Blocker"
- 2019 European Championship "Best Middle Blocker"
- 2019 European Championship "Best Blocker"
- 2020 Summer Olympics – Women's European qualification "Best Middle Blocker"
- 2020 Summer Olympics – Women's European qualification "Best Blocker"
- 2021 Nations League "Best Middle Blocker"
- 2021 Nations League "Best Blocker"
- 2021 European Championship "Best Middle Blocker"
- 2025 FIVB World Championship "Best Middle Blocker"
- 2025 FIVB World Championship – "Best Middle Blocker"

== Personal life ==
She is married with Erdem Dündar since 2011. Her husband's name is same with her maiden's surname: "Erdem", and she uses both surnames together: "Erdem Dündar", so she bears her husband's name and surname on her jersey.

She also has a maritime badge and is a ship captain.

Her family roots trace back to the town of Rožaje in Montenegro. Her family, originally surnamed Murić, emigrated from Montenegro to Istanbul in 1969 and settled in the Beşyüzevler neighborhood, which is known for its large Bosniak diaspora community. Her father Isljam was born in the village of Klanac, while her mother Suljka (née Grlić) is from Paučina.

== Out of courts ==
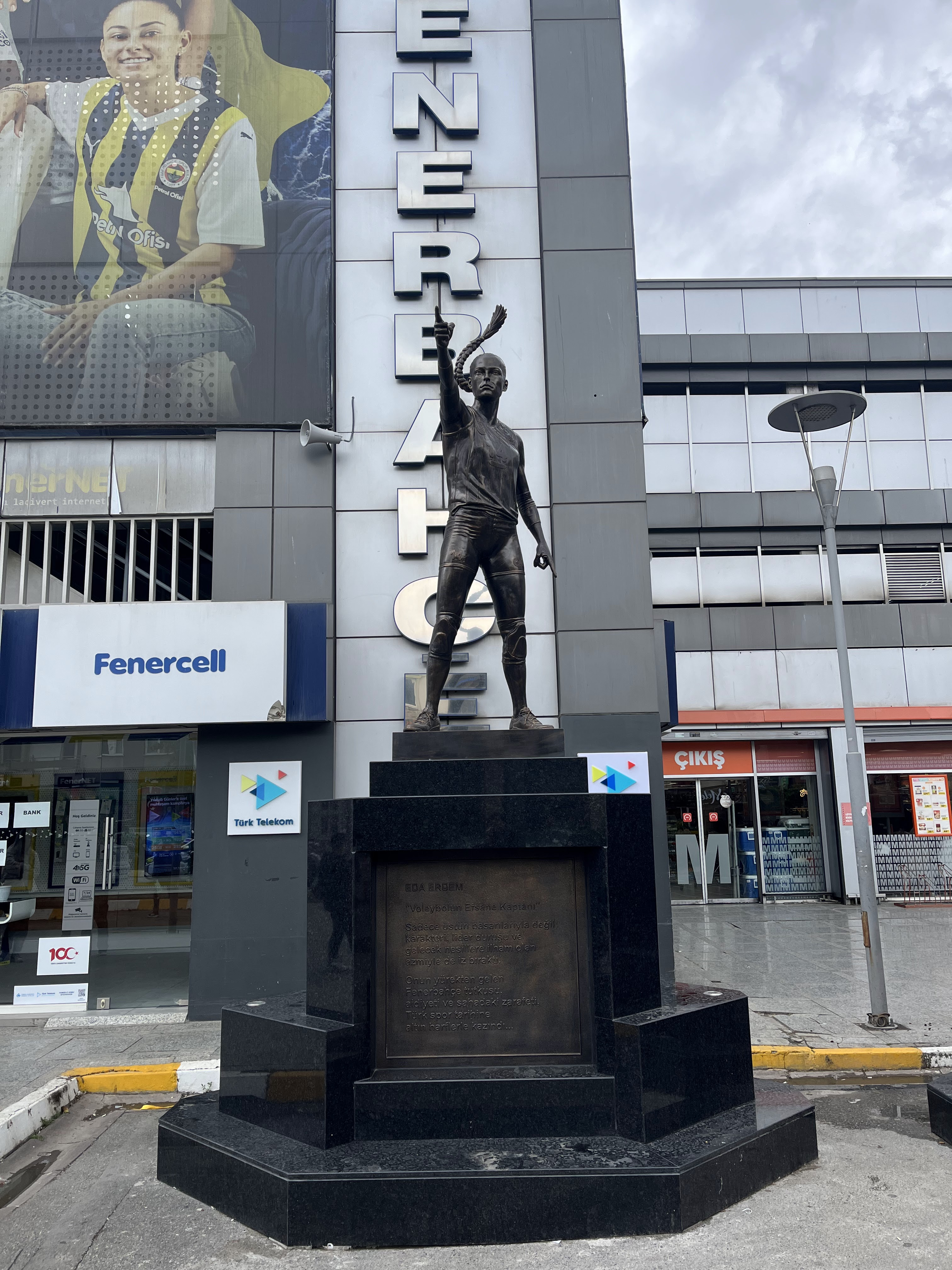
Eda Erdem Dündar Monument

Eda Erdem's presence on the court, combined with her exceptional skills and experience, has solidified her status as a role model for aspiring athletes. She is also known for her participation in social projects other than volleyball. One of these is a project to encourage girls to do sports.

As of March 30, 2022, she was elected as the Chairman of the Athlete Commission of the Turkish National Olympic Committee.

On 8 March 2024, Fenerbahçe SK unveiled a ceremony of Eda Erdem's "The Idol of Young Girls and All Successful Women Monument" in front of Şükrü Saraçoğlu Stadium on the International Women's Day. The statue is located next to other statues: Mustafa Kemal Atatürk who is founder of the Republic of Türkiye, Lefter Küçükandonyadis and Alex who are legendary football players of the club's football team, Can Bartu who is legendary football and basketball player of the club.

On 26 March 2024, She was nominated for the United States' International Women of Courage award, citing her achievements and work on women's empowerment as an example.

She also became the on-screen face of the "Empowering Girls Through Sport Project in Turkey" by Turkish National Olympic Committee.

In October 2025, UN Women announced Eda Erdem Dündar as Turkey's Goodwill Ambassador.

== See also ==
- Statue of Eda Erdem
- Turkish women in sports

Awards
Preceded by (Bulgaria) Strashimira Filipova	Best Server of European League; 2011	Succeeded by (Bulgaria) Dobriana Rabadzhieva
Preceded by (Brazil) Ana Flávia	Best Server of FIVB Club World Championship; 2010	Succeeded by (Turkey) Bahar Toksoy
Preceded by (Serbia) Nađa Ninković	Best Blocker of European League; 2010	Succeeded by (Netherlands) Caroline Wensink
Preceded by Best Blocker of (Germany) Christiane Fürst	Best Middle Blocker of European Championship; 2015 (with (Russia) Irina Zaryazhko); 2017 (with (Serbia) Stefana Veljković); 2019 (with (Poland) Agnieszka Kąkolewska); 2021 (with (Italy) Anna Danesi)	Succeeded by (Turkey) Zehra Güneş
Preceded by (Brazil) Ana Beatriz Corrêa and (Serbia) Milena Rašić	Best Middle Blocker of FIVB Nations League; 2018 (with (United States) TeTori Dixon); 2021(with (Brazil) Carol Gattaz)	Succeeded by (Brazil) Ana Beatriz Corrêa and (United States) Haleigh Washington (Brazil) Ana Carolina da Silva and (Serbia) Jovana Stevanović
Preceded by (Brazil) Ana Carolina da Silva and (Italy) Anna Danesi	Best Middle Blocker of World Championship; 2025 (with (Italy) Anna Danesi)	Succeeded by TBD
