= Navitski =

Navitski or Navicki, female Navitskaya or Navickaya, is a Belarusian surname (Belarusian: Навіцкі). Notable people with the surname include:

- Henadz Navitski (born 1949), Belarusian politician

== See also ==
- Navickas
- Novickis
- Nowicki
- Novitsky
