= Navickas =

- Lithuanian surname
- m.: Navickas
- f.: (unmarried): Navickaitė
- f.: (married): Navickienė

Navickas is a Lithuanian language family name. Its variants are Novickis and Navickis. Its alternative true form of Lithuanian origin is Naujalis. It corresponds to Polish surname Nowicki and Russian Novitsky/Novitski. Balarusian: Navitski. The surname may refer to:

- Kęstutis Navickas (born 1984), Lithuanian badminton player
- Karolis Navickas (born 1990), Lithuanian rugby union player
