= FIVB Volleyball Club World Championship =

FIVB Volleyball Club World Championship may refer to:

- FIVB Volleyball Men's Club World Championship
- FIVB Volleyball Women's Club World Championship
