= South American Women's Volleyball Club Championship =

- Current season, competition or edition: 2026 Women's South American Volleyball Club Championship
- Sport: Volleyball
- Founded: 1970
- First season: 1970
- No. of teams: 9
- Country: CSV members
- Continent: South America (CSV)
- Most recent champion: (Brazil) SESI Bauru (1st title)
- Most titles: (Brazil) Fluminense (6 titles)

The South American Women's Volleyball Club Championship is an international women's club volleyball competition organized by the Confederación Sudamericana de Voleibol (CSV), the sport's governing body in South America. The competition was first contested in 1970 in Lima, Peru and tournaments have been held every year since then.

In addition to crowning the South American champions, the tournament also serves as a qualifying tournament for the FIVB Volleyball Women's Club World Championship.

== Qualification ==
| Association | Qualification method |
|---|---|
| Argentina (1 berth) | Liga Femenina de Voleibol Argentino winners |
| Brazil (2 berths) | Superliga Brasileira de Voleibol Feminino - Série A winners |
| Brazil (2 berths) | Superliga Brasileira de Voleibol Feminino - Série A runners-up |
| Chile (1 berth) | Liga Chilena de Voleibol winners |
| Ecuador (1 berth) | Liga Ecuatoriana de Voleibol winners |
| Peru (2 berths) | Liga Peruana de Vóley Femenino winners |
| Peru (2 berths) | Liga Peruana de Vóley Femenino runners-up |
| Uruguay (1 berth) | Liga Uruguaya de Voleibol winners |
| Venezuela (1 berth) | Liga Venezolana winners |

== Results ==
Source: Official website.

- (In bracket, title count):

| Ed. | Year | Host | Final | | | 3rd place match | | | Teams |
| Ed. | Year | Host | (gold) Champions | Score | (silver) Runners-up | (bronze) Third place | Score | Fourth place | Teams |
|---|---|---|---|---|---|---|---|---|---|
| 1 | 1970 | (Peru) Lima | (Brazil) Esporte Pinheiros (1) | | (Peru) Regatas Lima | (Argentina) Gimnasia y Esgrima (BA) | | (Paraguay) Cerro Porteño | 5 |
| 2 | 1971 | (Brazil) Brasília | (Brazil) Fluminense (1) | | (Uruguay) Capurro | (Argentina) Gimnasia y Esgrima (BA) | | (Paraguay) Cerro Porteño | 4 |
| 3 | 1972 | (Brazil) Curitiba | (Brazil) Fluminense (2) | | (Argentina) Gimnasia y Esgrima (BA) | (Paraguay) Cerro Porteño | | — | 3 |
| 4 | 1973 | (Colombia) Medellín | (Brazil) Athletico Paulistano (1) | | (Argentina) Gimnasia y Esgrima (BA) | (Colombia) A-Tac | | — | 3 |
| 5 | 1975 | (Chile) Santiago | (Argentina) Gimnasia y Esgrima (BA) (1) | | (Paraguay) Olimpia | (Chile) Liceo Manuel Salas | | — | 3 |
| 6 | 1976 | (Argentina) Buenos Aires | (Argentina) Gimnasia y Esgrima (BA) (2) | | (Brazil) Minas Tênis | (Paraguay) Olimpia | | (Chile) Instituto Manuel de Salas | 6 |
| 7 | 1977 | (Argentina) Buenos Aires | (Brazil) Fluminense (3) | | (Argentina) Gimnasia y Esgrima (BA) | (Argentina) Regatas de Santa Fe | | Universidad de Chile | 6 |
| 8 | 1978 | (Chile) Santiago | (Brazil) Fluminense (4) | | (Argentina) Gimnasia y Esgrima (BA) | (Argentina) Buenos Aires | | (Brazil) Regatas Brasil | 7 |
| 9 | 1979 | (Brazil) Rio de Janeiro | (Brazil) Fluminense (5) | | (Brazil) Flamengo | (Argentina) Gimnasia y Esgrima (BA) | | (Paraguay) Recoleta | 6 |
| 10 | 1980 | (Argentina) Buenos Aires | (Brazil) Fluminense (6) | | (Peru) Bancoper | (Brazil) Flamengo | | (Argentina) Ferro Carril Oeste | 6 |
| 11 | 1981 | (Bolivia) Sucre | (Brazil) Flamengo (1) | | (Brazil) Fluminense | (Argentina) Ferro Carril Oeste | | (Bolivia) San Martín | 6 |
| 12 | 1983 | (Argentina) Buenos Aires | (Peru) Power (1) | | (Brazil) Athletico Paulistano | (Argentina) Ferro Carril Oeste | | (Brazil) Flamengo | 5 |
| 13 | 1984 | (Peru) Lima | (Peru) Power (2) | | (Brazil) Supergásbrás | (Peru) Deportivo Bancoper | | (Bolivia) San Martín | 4 |
| 14 | 1985 | (Chile) Santiago | (Brazil) Bradesco (1) | 3–2 | (Peru) Power | (Argentina) Ferro Carril Oeste | | Universidad de Chile | 6 |
| 15 | 1986 | (Bolivia) La Paz | (Peru) Power (3) | 3–0 | (Brazil) Pirelli | (Argentina) Regatas de Mendoza | 3–1 | (Bolivia) San Antonio | 6 |
| 16 | 1987 | (Bolivia) La Paz | (Peru) Power (4) | | (Brazil) Transbrasil | (Argentina) Buenos Aires | | (Paraguay) Recoleta | 6 |
| 17 | 1988 | (Paraguay) Asunción | (Peru) Power (5) | | (Brazil) Supergásbras | (Peru) Regatas Lima | | (Colombia) El Cedro | 8 |
| 18 | 1989 | (Chile) Santiago | (Brazil) Sadia (1) | | (Peru) Power | (Chile) Universidad Católica | | (Peru) Latino Amisa | 7 |
| 19 | 1990 | (Argentina) Buenos Aires | (Brazil) Sadia (2) | | (Brazil) Supergásbras | (Peru) Power | | (Argentina) Boca Juniors | 9 |
| 20 | 1991 | (Brazil) Ribeirão Preto | (Brazil) Sadia (3) | 3–0 | (Brazil) PAEC | (Peru) Alianza Lima | 3–0 | (Colombia) Jundeportes | 8 |
| 21 | 1992 | (Brazil) São Caetano do Sul | (Brazil) São Caetano (1) | 3–1 | (Brazil) Minas Tênis | (Peru) Power | 3–0 | (Argentina) El Cedro | 7 |
| 22 | 1994 | (Colombia) Medellín | (Brazil) Caja Recreativa | 3–0 | (Peru) Alianza Lima | (Brazil) Colgate São Caetano | 3–1 | (Peru) Cristal Bancoper | |
| 23 | 2009 | (Peru) Lima | (Brazil) Osasco (1) | 3–1 | (Brazil) Rio de Janeiro | (Argentina) Boca Juniors | 3–2 | (Peru) Regatas Lima | 6 |
| 24 | 2010 | (Peru) Lima | (Brazil) Osasco (2) | – (Note: Round-robin format.) | (Peru) Géminis | (Argentina) Banco Nación | – | (Chile) Universidad Católica | 4 |
| 25 | 2011 | (Brazil) Osasco | (Brazil) Osasco (3) | – | (Chile) Universidad Católica | (Bolivia) University of San Francisco Xavier | – | (Paraguay) Sport Club Venezuela | 4 |
| 26 | 2012 | (Brazil) Osasco | (Brazil) Osasco (4) | – | (Argentina) Boca Juniors | (Bolivia) Universidad Católica | – | (Paraguay) Sport Club Venezuela | 4 |
| 27 | 2013 | (Peru) Lima | (Brazil) Rio de Janeiro (1) | – | (Peru) Universidad César Vallejo | (Chile) Boston College | – | (Argentina) Vélez Sársfield | 5 |
| 28 | 2014 | (Brazil) Osasco | (Brazil) SESI São Paulo (1) | 3–0 | (Brazil) Osasco | (Argentina) Boca Juniors | 3–0 | (Peru) LNSV | 8 |
| 29 | 2015 | (Brazil) Osasco | (Brazil) Rio de Janeiro (2) | 3–1 | (Brazil) Osasco | (Peru) Universidad San Martín | 3–0 | (Argentina) Villa Dora | 8 |
| 30 | 2016 | (Argentina) La Plata | (Brazil) Rio de Janeiro (3) | 3–0 | (Peru) Universidad San Martín | (Argentina) Villa Dora | 3–1 | (Argentina) Gimnasia y Esgrima (LP) | 6 |
| 31 | 2017 | (Brazil) Uberaba / Uberlândia | (Brazil) Rio de Janeiro (4) | 3–1 | (Brazil) Dentil Praia | (Peru) Universidad San Martín | 3–0 | (Argentina) Villa Dora | 6 |
| 32 | 2018 | (Brazil) Belo Horizonte | (Brazil) Minas Tênis (1) | 3–2 | (Brazil) Rio de Janeiro | (Peru) Regatas Lima | 3–0 | (Argentina) Gimnasia y Esgrima (LP) | 6 |
| 33 | 2019 | (Brazil) Belo Horizonte | (Brazil) Minas Tênis (2) | – | (Brazil) Dentil Praia | (Argentina) San Lorenzo | – | (Argentina) Boca Juniors | 5 |
| 34 | 2020 | (Brazil) Uberlândia | (Brazil) Minas Tênis (3) | – | (Brazil) Dentil Praia | (Argentina) San Lorenzo | – | (Argentina) Boca Juniors | 5 |
| 35 | 2021 | (Brazil) Brasília | (Brazil) Praia (1) | – | (Brazil) Minas Tênis | (Brazil) Brasília Vôlei | – | (Uruguay) Olimpia | 5 |
| 36 | 2022 | (Brazil) Uberlândia | (Brazil) Minas Tênis (4) | 3–2 | (Brazil) Dentil Praia | (Brazil) SESI Bauru | 3–0 | (Peru) Regatas Lima | 6 |
| 37 | 2023 | (Brazil) Uberlândia | (Brazil) Dentil Praia (2) | 3–2 | (Brazil) Minas Tênis | (Brazil) SESI Bauru | 3–0 | (Peru) Regatas Lima | 7 |
| 38 | 2024 | (Brazil) Bauru | (Brazil) Gerdau/Minas (5) | 3–2 | (Brazil) Dentil Praia | (Brazil) SESI Bauru | 3–1 | (Peru) Regatas Lima | 6 |
| 39 | 2025 | (Brazil) Uberlândia | (Brazil) Dentil Praia (3) | 3–0 | (Peru) Alianza Lima | (Brazil) Gerdau/Minas | 3–0 | (Argentina) Estudiantes (LP) | 7 |
| 40 | 2026 | (Peru) Lima | (Brazil) SESI Bauru (1) | 3–0 | (Brazil) Osasco | (Peru) Alianza Lima | 3–0 | (Peru) Universidad San Martín | 9 |

== Medals summary ==
=== Medal table by club ===
| Rank | Nation | Gold | Silver | Bronze | Total |
|---|---|---|---|---|---|
| 1 | (Brazil) Fluminense | 6 | 1 | 0 | 7 |
| 2 | (Brazil) Minas Tênis | 5 | 4 | 1 | 10 |
| 3 | (Peru) Power | 5 | 2 | 2 | 9 |
| 4 | (Brazil) Osasco | 4 | 3 | 0 | 7 |
| 5 | (Brazil) Rio de Janeiro | 4 | 2 | 0 | 6 |
| 6 | (Brazil) Dentil Praia | 3 | 5 | 0 | 8 |
| 7 | (Brazil) Sadia | 3 | 0 | 0 | 3 |
| 8 | (Argentina) Gimnasia y Esgrima (BA) | 2 | 4 | 3 | 9 |
| 9 | (Brazil) Flamengo | 1 | 1 | 1 | 3 |
| 10 | (Brazil) Athletico Paulistano | 1 | 1 | 0 | 2 |
| 11 | (Brazil) SESI Vôlei Bauru | 1 | 0 | 3 | 4 |
| 12 | (Brazil) SESI São Paulo | 1 | 0 | 1 | 2 |
| 13 | (Brazil) Bradesco | 1 | 0 | 0 | 1 |
| 13 | (Brazil) Caja Recreativa | 1 | 0 | 0 | 1 |
| 13 | (Brazil) Esporte Pinheiros | 1 | 0 | 0 | 1 |
| 13 | (Brazil) São Caetano | 1 | 0 | 0 | 1 |
| 17 | (Brazil) Supergásbrás | 0 | 3 | 0 | 3 |
| 18 | (Peru) Alianza Lima | 0 | 2 | 2 | 4 |
| 19 | (Argentina) Boca Juniors | 0 | 1 | 2 | 3 |
| 19 | (Peru) Regatas Lima | 0 | 1 | 2 | 3 |
| 19 | (Peru) Universidad San Martín | 0 | 1 | 2 | 3 |
| 22 | (Peru) Deportivo Bancoper | 0 | 1 | 1 | 2 |
| 22 | (Paraguay) Olimpia | 0 | 1 | 1 | 2 |
| 22 | (Chile) Universidad Católica | 0 | 1 | 1 | 2 |
| 25 | (Uruguay) Capurro | 0 | 1 | 0 | 1 |
| 25 | (Brazil) PAEC | 0 | 1 | 0 | 1 |
| 25 | (Brazil) Pirelli | 0 | 1 | 0 | 1 |
| 25 | (Brazil) Transbrasil | 0 | 1 | 0 | 1 |
| 25 | (Peru) Géminis | 0 | 1 | 0 | 1 |
| 25 | (Peru) Universidad César Vallejo | 0 | 1 | 0 | 1 |
| 31 | (Argentina) Ferro Carril Oeste | 0 | 0 | 3 | 3 |
| 32 | (Argentina) Buenos Aires | 0 | 0 | 2 | 2 |
| 32 | (Argentina) San Lorenzo | 0 | 0 | 2 | 2 |
| 34 | (Colombia) A-Tac | 0 | 0 | 1 | 1 |
| 34 | (Chile) Boston College | 0 | 0 | 1 | 1 |
| 34 | (Brazil) Brasília Vôlei | 0 | 0 | 1 | 1 |
| 34 | (Chile) Liceo Manuel Salas | 0 | 0 | 1 | 1 |
| 34 | (Argentina) Mendoza | 0 | 0 | 1 | 1 |
| 34 | (Argentina) Regatas Santa Fe | 0 | 0 | 1 | 1 |
| 34 | (Bolivia) Universidad Católica | 0 | 0 | 1 | 1 |
| 34 | (Bolivia) Universidad San Francisco Xavier | 0 | 0 | 1 | 1 |
| 34 | (Argentina) Villa Dora | 0 | 0 | 1 | 1 |
| 34 | (Argentina) Banco Nación | 0 | 0 | 1 | 1 |
| 34 | (Paraguay) Cerro Porteño | 0 | 0 | 1 | 1 |
| Totals (44 entries) | | 40 | 40 | 40 | 120 |

=== Medal table by country ===
| Rank | Nation | Gold | Silver | Bronze | Total |
|---|---|---|---|---|---|
| 1 | Brazil | 33 | 23 | 7 | 63 |
| 2 | Peru | 5 | 9 | 9 | 23 |
| 3 | Argentina | 2 | 5 | 16 | 23 |
| 4 | Chile | 0 | 1 | 3 | 4 |
| 5 | Paraguay | 0 | 1 | 2 | 3 |
| 6 | Uruguay | 0 | 1 | 0 | 1 |
| 7 | Bolivia | 0 | 0 | 2 | 2 |
| 8 | Colombia | 0 | 0 | 1 | 1 |
| Totals (8 entries) | | 40 | 40 | 40 | 120 |

== Most valuable player by edition ==
| Rank | Name | Club |
|---|---|---|
| 2009 | (Brazil) Jaqueline Carvalho | Osasco |
| 2010 | (Brazil) Adenízia da Silva | Osasco |
| 2011 | (Brazil) Jaqueline Carvalho | Osasco |
| 2012 | (Brazil) Sheilla Castro | Osasco |
| 2013 | (Brazil) Natália Pereira | Rio de Janeiro |
| 2014 | (Brazil) Fabiana Claudino | SESI São Paulo |
| 2015 | (Cuba) Kenia Carcaces | Osasco |
| 2016 | (Brazil) Ana Carolina da Silva | Rio de Janeiro |
| 2017 | (Brazil) Gabriela Guimarães | Rio de Janeiro |
| 2018 | (Brazil) Caroline Gattaz | Minas Tênis |
| 2019 | (Brazil) Caroline Gattaz | Minas Tênis |
| 2020 | (Brazil) Thaísa Menezes | Minas Tênis |
| 2021 | (Brazil) Cláudia Bueno | Dentil Praia |
| 2022 | (Brazil) Kisy Nascimento | Minas Tênis |
| 2023 | (Dominican Republic) Brayelin Martínez | Dentil Praia |
| 2024 | (Brazil) Julia Kudiess | Minas Tênis |
| 2025 | (Brazil) Adenizia Silva | Praia |
| 2026 | (Brazil) Dani Lins | SESI Bauru |

== Others competitions ==
=== Campeonato Sudamericano de Campeones ===
| Ed. | Year | Host | Final | | | 3rd place match | | |
| Ed. | Year | Host | (gold) Champions | Score | (silver) Runners-up | (bronze) Third place | Score | Fourth place |
|---|---|---|---|---|---|---|---|---|
| 1 | 1993 | (Peru) Lima | (Brazil) São Caetano | | (Brazil) Minas Tênis | (Peru) Alianza Lima | | (Peru) Latino Amisa |
| 2 | 1995 | (Colombia) Medellín | (Peru) Sipesa Juventus | 3–1 | (Peru) Cristal Bancoper | (Venezuela) Indias de Miranda | 3–0 | (Argentina) Racing |
| 3 | 1996 | (Peru) Lima | (Brazil) Sollo Tietê | | (Brazil) Transmontano JC Amaral | (Peru) Sipesa Juventus | 3–0 | (Argentina) All Boys (SR) |
| 4 | 1997 | (Colombia) Medellín | (Brazil) Jundiaí | | (Brazil) Uniban | (Argentina) Boca Juniors | | (Peru) Regatas Lima |
| 5 | 1998 | (Colombia) Medellín | (Brazil) Jundiaí | 3–0 | (Peru) Deportivo Pesquero | (Argentina) Boca Juniors | 3–0 | (Argentina) Gimnasia y Esgrima (BA) |
| 6 | 1999 | (Bolivia) Cochabamba | (Brazil) Minas Tênis | | (Peru) Deportivo Pesquero | (Brazil) Petrobras/Macaé | | (Argentina) River Plate |

=== Liga Sudamericana ===
| Ed. | Year | Host | Final | | | 3rd place match | | |
| Ed. | Year | Host | Champions | Score | Runners-up | 3rd place | Score | 4th place |
|---|---|---|---|---|---|---|---|---|
| 1 | 2000 | (Brazil) Joinville | (Brazil) Minas Tênis | | (Brazil) Classista BCN | (Venezuela) Indias de Miranda | | (Argentina) Gimnasia y Esgrima (LP) |

== See also ==
- South American Men's Volleyball Club Championship
