= 2023 Women's South American Volleyball Club Championship =

16th official edition of the Women's South American Volleyball Club Championship

2023 Women's South American Club Championship
Tournament details
- Host country: Brazil
- Dates: 10 to 14 May
- Teams: 7
- Venue: 1 (in 1 host city)

Final positions
- Champions: (Brazil) Praia (2nd title)

Tournament awards
- MVP: (Dominican Republic) Brayelin Martínez

The 2023 Women's South American Volleyball Club Championship was the 36th official edition of the Women's South American Volleyball Club Championship, played by seven teams from May 10 to May 14, 2023, in Uberlândia, Brazil.

Praia won its second and overall title, and qualified for the 2023 FIVB Volleyball Women's Club World Championship.

== Teams ==
Pool
(Bolivia) Olympic
(Brazil) Gerdau Minas
(Brazil) Praia
(Brazil) SESI Bauru
(Chile) Boston College
(Peru) Regatas Lima
(Uruguay) Juan Ferreira

== Preliminary round ==
=== Group A ===
Pos	Team	Pld	W	L	Pts	SW	SL	SR	SPW	SPL	SPR	Qualification
1	(Brazil) Praia	2	2	0	6	6	1	6.000	174	118	1.475	Semifinals
2	(Peru) Regatas Lima	2	1	1	3	4	5	0.800	177	191	0.927	Semifinals
3	(Chile) Boston College	2	0	2	0	2	6	0.333	146	188	0.777	

Date		Score		Set 1	Set 2	Set 3	Set 4	Set 5	Total
10 May	Praia (Brazil)	3–0	(Chile) Boston College	25–21	25–16	25–17			75–54
11 May	Praia (Brazil)	3–1	(Peru) Regatas Lima	25–14	24–26	25–14	25–10		99–64
12 May	Regatas Lima (Peru)	3–2	(Chile) Boston College	23–25	23–25	25–13	25–14	17–15	113–92

=== Group B ===
Pos	Team	Pld	W	L	Pts	SW	SL	SR	SPW	SPL	SPR	Qualification
1	(Brazil) Gerdau Minas	3	3	0	9	9	0	MAX	225	132	1.705	Semifinals
2	(Brazil) SESI Bauru	3	2	1	6	6	3	2.000	217	126	1.722	Semifinals
3	(Bolivia) Olympic	3	1	2	3	3	7	0.429	159	215	0.740	
4	(Uruguay) Juan Ferreira	3	0	3	0	1	9	0.111	113	244	0.463	

Date		Score		Set 1	Set 2	Set 3	Set 4	Set 5	Total
10 May	SESI Bauru (Brazil)	3–0	(Uruguay) Juan Ferreira	25–10	25–5	25–5			75–20
10 May	Gerdau Minas (Brazil)	3–0	(Bolivia) Olympic	25–14	25–10	25–10			75–34
11 May	Juan Ferreira (Uruguay)	1–3	(Bolivia) Olympic	14–25	13–25	25–19	13–25		65–94
11 May	Gerdau Minas (Brazil)	3–0	(Brazil) SESI Bauru	25–22	25–22	25–23			75–67
12 May	SESI Bauru (Brazil)	3–0	(Bolivia) Olympic	25–11	25–6	25–12			75–29
11 May	Gerdau Minas (Brazil)	3–0	(Uruguay) Juan Ferreira	25–22	25–22	25–23			75–67

== Final round ==
=== Bracket ===
Semifinals
13 May
(Brazil) Praia	3
(Brazil) SESI Bauru	0
13 May
(Brazil) Gerdau Minas	3
(Peru) Regatas Lima	0

Final
10 May
(Brazil) Praia	3
(Brazil) Gerdau Minas	2
3rd place
14 May
(Brazil) SESI Bauru	3
(Peru) Regatas Lima	0

=== Fifth place match ===
Date		Score		Set 1	Set 2	Set 3	Set 4	Set 5	Total
13 May	Olympic (Bolivia)	1–3	(Chile) Boston College	25–18	21–25	20–25	15–25		81–93

=== Semifinals ===
Date		Score		Set 1	Set 2	Set 3	Set 4	Set 5	Total
13 May	Gerdau Minas (Brazil)	3–0	(Peru) Regatas Lima	25–19	25–17	25–18			75–54
13 May	Praia (Brazil)	3–0	(Brazil) SESI Bauru	25–16	25–14	25–19			75–49

=== Third place match ===
Date		Score		Set 1	Set 2	Set 3	Set 4	Set 5	Total
14 May	SESI Bauru (Brazil)	3–0	(Peru) Regatas Lima	25–20	25–15	25–22			75–57

=== Final ===
Date		Score		Set 1	Set 2	Set 3	Set 4	Set 5	Total
10 May	Praia (Brazil)	3–2	(Brazil) Gerdau Minas	25–16	17–25	27–25	12–25	15–11	96–102

== Final standing ==
Rank	Team
1st place, gold medalist(s)	(Brazil) Praia
2nd place, silver medalist(s)	(Brazil) Gerdau Minas
3rd place, bronze medalist(s)	(Brazil) SESI Bauru
4	(Peru) Regatas Lima
5	(Chile) Boston College
6	(Bolivia) Olympic
7	(Uruguay) Juan Ferreira

Qualified for the 2023 FIVB Volleyball Women's Club World Championship

2023 Women's South American Volleyball Club Championship

Praia
2nd title

== All-Star team ==
The following players were chosen for the tournament's "All-Star team":

- Most valuable player
  - (Dominican Republic) Brayelin Martínez (Praia)
- Best Opposite
  - (Brazil) Kisy (Gerdau Minas)
- Best outside hitters
  - (Dominican Republic) Brayelin Martínez (Praia)
  - (Brazil) Peña (Gerdau Minas)
- Best setter
  - (Brazil) Dani Lins (SESI Bauru)
- Best libero
  - (Peru) Mirian Patiño (Regatas Lima)
- Best middle blockers
  - (Brazil) Thaísa Menezes (Gerdau Minas)
  - (Dominican Republic) Jineiry Martinez (Praia)

== See also ==
- 2023 Men's South American Volleyball Club Championship
