= Club World Championship =

Club World Championship may refer to:

- FIFA Club World Cup, a football competition
  - Intercontinental Cup (football), the unofficial predecessor to the FIFA Club World Cup
  - FIFA Intercontinental Cup, a global football competition from 2024 using the FIFA Club World Cup's 2005 to 2023 format
- FIBA Intercontinental Cup, an international basketball championship for clubs
- World Club Challenge, a rugby league football competition
- Fédération Internationale de Volleyball world club competitions:
  - FIVB Women's Volleyball Club World Championship
  - FIVB Men's Volleyball Club World Championship
