= 2023 FIVB Women's Volleyball Nations League squads =

This article shows the roster of all participating teams at the 2023 FIVB Volleyball Women's Nations League.

== Brazil ==
The following is Brazil's roster in the 2023 Women's Nations League.

Head Coach: (Brazil) José Roberto Guimaraes

- 2 Diana Duarte MB
- 3 Júlia Kudiess MB
- 5 Priscila Daroit OH
- 6 Nyeme Costa L
- 7 Rosamaria Montibeller OH
- 8 Macris Carneiro S
- 9 Roberta Ratzke S
- 10 Gabriela Guimarães OH
- 11 Karina Barbosa OH
- 14 Natália Araujo L
- 15 Lorena Viezel MB
- 16 Kisy Nascimento OP
- 17 Júlia Bergmann OH
- 19 Tainara Santos OH

== Bulgaria ==
The following is Bulgaria's roster in the 2023 Women's Nations League.

Head Coach: (Italy) Lorenzo Micelli

- 1 Iveta Stanchulova OH
- 4 Polina Neykova S
- 5 Maria Yordanova OH
- 6 Simona Nikolova OP
- 8 Petya Barakova S
- 9 Elena Becheva OH
- 10 Mira Todorova MB
- 11 Mariya Krivoshiyska MB
- 13 Mila Pashkuleva L
- 14 Borislava Saykova MB
- 17 Radostina Marinova OP
- 21 Monika Krasteva OH
- 23 Galina Karabasheva L
- 28 Merelin Nikolova OP

== Canada ==
The following is the Canada's roster in the 2023 Women's Nations League.

Head coach: (Canada) Shannon Winzer

- 3 Kiera Van Ryk OH
- 5 Julia Murmann L
- 6 Jazmine White MB
- 7 Layne Van Buskirk MB
- 8 Alicia Ogoms MB
- 9 Alexa Gray OH
- 11 Andrea Mitrovic OH
- 13 Brie King S
- 14 Hilary Howe OH
- 15 Shainah Joseph OP
- 16 Caroline Livingston OH
- 17 Jost Kacey L
- 19 Emily Maglio MB
- 26 Quinn Pelland S

== China ==
The following is the China's roster in the 2023 Women's Nations League.

Head Coach: (China) Cai Bin

- 1 Yuan Xinyue MB
- 3 Diao Linyu S
- 4 Yang Hanyu MB
- 5 Gao Yi MB
- 6 Gong Xiangyu OP
- 7 Wang Yuanyuan MB
- 8 Xu Xiaoxiang S
- 10 Wang Yunlu OH
- 11 Zhong Hui OH
- 12 Li Yingying OH
- 14 Zheng Yixin MB
- 17 Ni Feifan L
- 18 Wang Mengjie L
- 23 Du Qingqing OH

== Croatia ==
The following is the Croatia's roster in the 2023 Women's Nations League.

Head coach: (Turkey) Ferhat Akbaş

- 1 Karla Antunović S
- 2 Andrea Mihaljević OP
- 3 Ema Strunjak MB
- 4 Božana Butigan MB
- 6 Lea Deak S
- 7 Laura Miloš OH
- 9 Lucija Mlinar OH
- 10 Dijana Karatović OH
- 12 Josipa Marković L
- 13 Samanta Fabris OP
- 14 Martina Šamadan MB
- 15 Viktoria Ana Trcol MB
- 16 Barbara Đapić OP
- 19 Izabela Štimac L

== Dominican Republic ==
The following is the Dominican Republic's roster in the 2023 Women's Nations League.

Head coach: (Brazil) Marcos Kwiek

- 2 Yaneirys Rodriguez L
- 3 Lisvel Elisa Eve MB
- 4 Vielka Peralta OH
- 5 Brenda Castillo L
- 7 Niverka Marte S
- 8 Alondra Tapia OP
- 9 Angélica Hinojosa MB
- 11 Geraldine González MB
- 12 Yokaty Pérez S
- 16 Yonkaira Peña OH
- 20 Brayelin Martínez OH
- 21 Jineiry Martínez MB
- 23 Gaila González OP
- 25 Larysmer Martínez L

== Germany ==
The following is the Germany's roster in the 2023 Women's Nations League.

Head coach: (Belgium) Vital Heynen

- 1 Vanessa Agbortabi OH
- 2 Pia Kästner S
- 3 Annie Cesar L
- 4 Pogany Anna L
- 5 Corina Glaab S
- 6 Antonia Stautz OH
- 9 Lina Alsmeier OH
- 10 Lena Stigrot OH
- 12 Hanna Orthmann OH
- 14 Marie Schölzel MB
- 15 Elisa Lohmann L
- 16 Anastasia Cekulaev MB
- 20 Emilia Weske OP
- 21 Camilla Weitzel MB
- 22 Monique Strubbe MB

== Italy ==
The following is Italy's roster in the 2023 Women's Nations League.

Head Coach: (Italy) Davide Mazzanti

- 2 Alice Degradi OH
- 3 Francesca Villani OH
- 4 Sara Bonifacio MB
- 7 Eleonora Fersino L
- 11 Anna Danesi MB
- 12 Alessia Mazzaro MB
- 15 Sylvia Nwakalor OP
- 16 Sofia D'Odorico OH
- 17 Miriam Sylla OH
- 19 Federica Squarcini MB
- 20 Beatrice Parrocchiale L
- 21 Loveth Omoruyi OH
- 23 Giulia Gennari S
- 32 Adhuoljok Malual OP

== Japan ==
The following is the Japan's roster in the 2023 Women's Nations League.

Head Coach: (Japan) Masayoshi Manabe

- 1 Miyu Nagaoka OP
- 2 Kotona Hayashi OH
- 3 Sarina Koga OH
- 4 Mayu Ishikawa OH
- 5 Haruyo Shimamura MB
- 6 Nanami Seki S
- 7 Mika Shibata S
- 9 Aya Watanabe MB
- 10 Arisa Inoue OH
- 11 Nichika Yamada MB
- 12 Satomi Fukudome L
- 15 Manami Kojima L
- 16 Yuka Meguro L
- 17 Mizuki Tanaka OH
- 20 Mami Yokota MB
- 21 Tamaki Matsui S
- 23 Airi Miyabe MB
- 24 Mai Irisawa MB
- 29 Minami Nishimura L
- 31 Yuki Nishikawa OH
- 34 Ayaka Araki MB
- 37 Yukiko Wada OH

== Netherlands ==
The following is the Netherlands's roster in the 2023 Women's Nations League.

Head Coach: (Germany) Felix Koslowski

- 1 Kirsten Knip L
- 3 Hester Jasper OH
- 4 Celeste Plak OP
- 5 Jolien Knollema OH
- 7 Juliët Lohuis MB
- 10 Sarah Van Aalen S
- 12 Bongaerts Britt S
- 16 Indy Baijens MB
- 17 Iris Vos OH
- 19 Nika Daalderop OH
- 23 Eline Timmerman MB
- 25 Florien Reesink L
- 27 Iris Scholten OP
- 33 Nova Marring OH

== Poland ==
The following is the Poland's roster in the 2023 Women's Nations League.

Head coach: (Italy) Stefano Lavarini

- 1 Maria Stenzel L
- 5 Agnieszka Kąkolewska MB
- 7 Monika Gałkowska OP
- 9 Magdalena Stysiak OP
- 10 Monika Fedusio OH
- 11 Martyna Łukasik OH
- 12 Aleksandra Szczygłowska L
- 15 Martyna Czyrniańska OH
- 23 Dominika Pierzchała MB
- 26 Katarzyna Wenerska S
- 27 Joanna Pacak MB
- 30 Olivia Różański OH
- 62 Julia Nowicka S
- 95 Magdalena Jurczyk MB

== Serbia ==
The following is Serbia's roster in the 2023 Women's Nations League.

Head coach: (Italy) Giovanni Guidetti

- 1 Bianka Buša OH
- 2 Katarina Lazović OH
- 4 Bojana Drča S
- 5 Mina Popović MB
- 9 Aleksandra Uzelac OH
- 10 Maja Ognjenović S
- 12 Teodora Pušić L
- 13 Ana Bjelica OP
- 14 Maja Aleksić MB
- 15 Jovana Stevanović MB
- 16 Aleksandra Jegdić L
- 18 Tijana Bošković OP
- 19 Bojana Milenković OH
- 22 Sara Lozo OP

== South Korea ==
The following is the South Korea's roster in the 2023 Women's Nations League.

Head Coach: (Spain) Cesar Hernández González

- 1 Kim Da-Eun OP
- 2 Juah Lee MB
- 3 Yeum Hye-seon S
- 5 Dain Kim S
- 7 Kim Ji-won S
- 12 Moon Jung-won L
- 13 Park Jeong-ah OH
- 14 Lee Da-hyeon MB
- 16 Jeong Ji-yun OH
- 17 Jung Ho-young MB
- 18 Kin Mi-youn OH
- 19 Pyo Seung-ju OH
- 71 Moon Ji-yun OP
- 97 Kang So-hwi OH

== Thailand ==
The following is Thailand's roster in the 2023 Women's Nations League.

Head coach: (Thailand) Danai Sriwatcharamethakul

- 1 Wipawee Srithong OH
- 2 Piyanut Pannoy L
- 3 Pornpun Guedpard S
- 4 Chitaporn Kamlangmak MB
- 5 Thatdao Nuekjang MB
- 12 Hattaya Bamrungsuk MB
- 14 Sutadta Chuewulim OH
- 15 Soraya Phomla S
- 16 Pimpichaya Kokram OP
- 17 Sasipapron Janthawisut OH
- 18 Ajcharaporn Kongyot OH
- 19 Chatchu-on Moksri OH
- 20 Supattra Pairoj L
- 21 Thanacha Sooksod OP
- 23 Sirima Manakij S
- 24 Tichakorn Boonlert MB
- 99 Jarasporn Bundasak MB

== Turkey ==
The following is the Türkiye's roster in the 2023 Women's Nations League.

Head coach: (Italy) Daniele Santarelli

- 1 Gizem Örge L
- 2 Simge Şebnem Aköz L
- 3 Cansu Özbay S
- 4 Melissa Vargas OP
- 5 Ayça Aykaç OH
- 7 Hande Baladın OH
- 11 Derya Cebecioğlu OH
- 12 Elif Şahin S
- 14 Eda Erdem Dündar MB
- 16 Saliha Şahin OH
- 18 Zehra Güneş MB
- 19 Aslı Kalaç MB
- 22 İlkin Aydın OH
- 99 Ebrar Karakurt OP

== United States ==
The following is USA's roster in the 2023 Women's Nations League.

Head coach: (United States) Karch Kiraly

- 1 Micha Hancock S
- 4 Justine Wong-Orantes L
- 5 Alexandra Frantti OH
- 6 Morgan Hentz L
- 7 Lauren Carlini S
- 11 Andrea Drews OP
- 12 Jordan Thompson OP
- 15 Haleigh Washington MB
- 16 Dana Rettke MB
- 23 Kelsey Robinson OH
- 24 Chiaka Ogbogu MB
- 26 Asjia O'Neal MB
- 27 Avery Skinner OH
- 29 Khalia Lanier OH

== See also ==
- 2023 FIVB Volleyball Women's Challenger Cup squads
- 2023 FIVB Volleyball Men's Nations League squads
