= Elif Şahin =

Olympic Turkish volleyball player

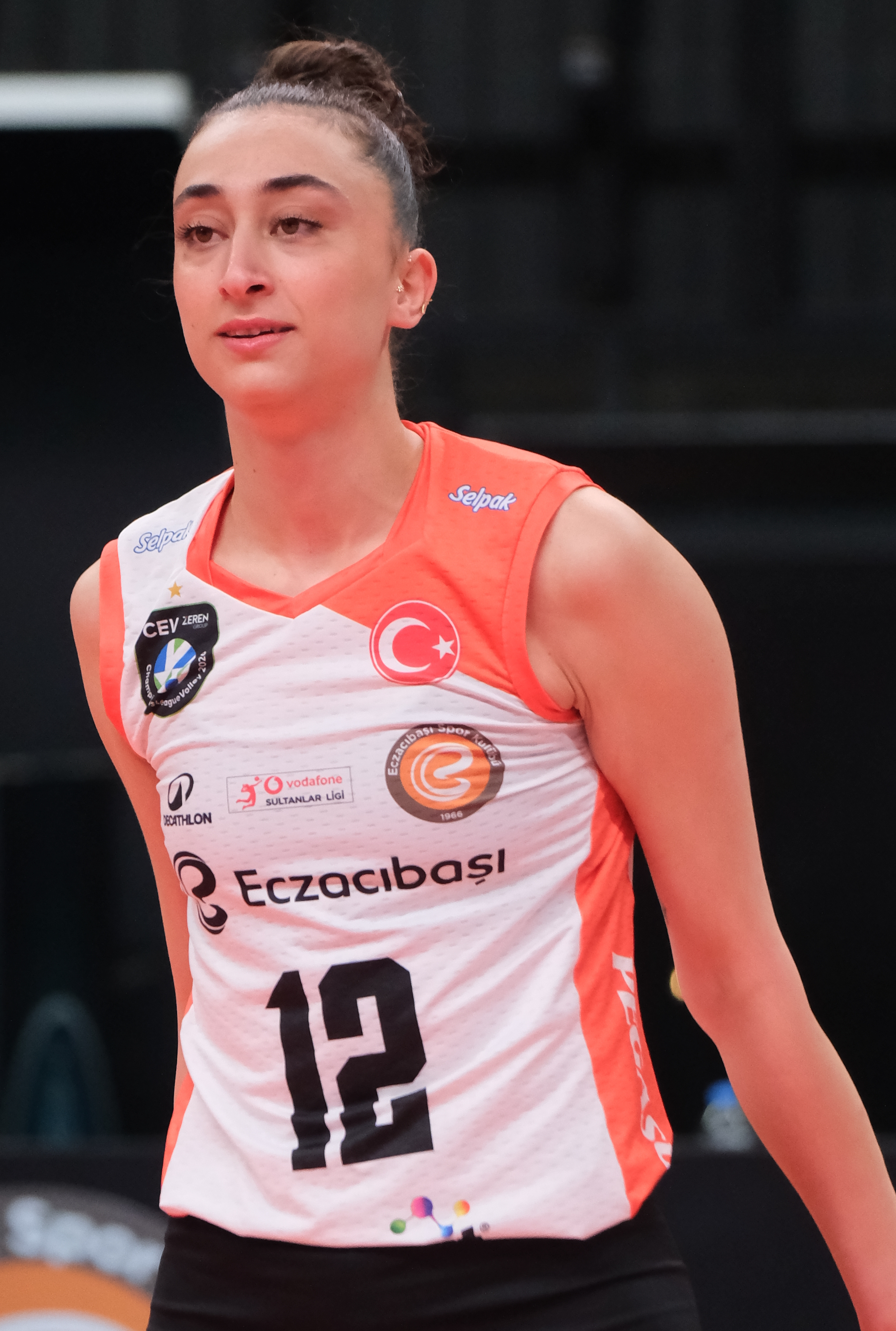
- Elif Şahin in 2025

Personal information
- Nationality: Turkish
- Born: 19 January 2001 (age 25); Ankara, Turkey
- Height: 1.84 m (6 ft 0 in)
- Weight: 68 kg (150 lb)
- Spike: 302 cm (119 in)
- Block: 300 cm (120 in)

Volleyball information
- Position: Setter
- Current club: Eczacıbaşı Dynavit
- Number: 12

Career
Years
- 2017–2020
- 2020–
Teams
- Karayolları SK
- Eczacıbaşı Dynavit

National team
- 2017
- 2018
- 2019–
- Turkey U-18
- Turkey U-19
- Turkey
Honours
Women's Volleyball
Representing Turkey
FIVB World Championship
Silver medal – second place	2025 Thailand	Team
FIVB Nations League
Gold medal – first place	2023 Arlington	Team
Gold medal – first place	2026 Macau	Team
European Championship
Gold medal – first place	2023 Belgium/Estonia/Germany/Italy	Team
Gold medal – first place	2026 Azerbaijan/Czech Republic/Sweden/Turkey	Team

Elif Şahin (born 19 January 2001) is a Turkish Volleyball player. She is 1.84 m (6 ft 1/2 in) tall at 68 kg (150 lb) and plays in the Setter position. She plays for Eczacıbaşı Dynavit in Istanbul. She is a member of the Turkey women's national volleyball team.

== Club career ==
Elif Şahin is 1.84 m (6 ft 1/2 in) tall at 68 kg (150 lb), and plays in the Setter position. She started her sport career in the academy of Karayolları SK in her hometown Ankara in the 2017–18 season. She won the Turkish runner-up title with the youth team in the 2017-19 season.

She joined Istanbul-based Eczacıbaşı Dynavit in the 2020–21 Turkish Women's Volleyball League. The same season, she won the 2020 AXA Sigorta Champions Cup. She took the bronze medal at the 2022 FIVB Volleyball Women's Club World Championship in Antalya, Turkey.

== International career ==
Şahin was admitted to the Turkey women's national U-18 team. She was part of the team, which placed fourth at the 2017 FIVB Girls' U18 World Championship in Argentina.

The next year, she played at the 2018 Women's U19 European Championship in Albania with the Turkey women's U-19 team, which finished fourth. She took the silver medal with the U-19 team at the 2018 Balkan Volleyball Championship Women's U19.

She is a member of the Turkey national team. She was part of the national team, which placed fourth at the 2019 FIVB Volleyball Women's Nations League in Nanjing, China. Her team finished the 2022 FIVB Volleyball Women's World Championship held in Poland and the Netherlands on place eight. She became gold medalist at the 2023 FIVB Volleyball Women's Nations League in Arlington, Texas, United States. She participated in the 2024 Paris Olympics with the Turkish national team. She won silver medal in the 2025 FIVB Volleyball World Championship. She won double gold medals in the 2026 national team season, winning 2026 FIVB Women's Volleyball National League and 2026 Women's European Volleyball Championships. -

== Personal life ==
Elif Şahin was born in Ankara, Turkey on 19 January 2001. She has two sisters. Her two-years older sister Saliha is also a professional volleyball player in the Outside Hitter position, who plays for Fenerbahçe and the Turkish National team.

== Honours ==
=== Individual ===
FIVB Volleyball Women's Club World Championship
Best Setter: 2023

=== Club ===
==== Karayolları SK ====
Turkish Junior Women Vollayball League
(silver) 2018

==== Eczacıbaşı Dynavit ====
Turkish Women's Volleyball League
(bronze) 2021–22
(silver) 2022–23

Turkish Women's Volleyball Cup
(silver) 2020–21
(bronze) 2021–22

Turkish Women's Volleyball Super Cup
(gold) 2020
(silver) 2021–22

AXA Sigorta Champions Cup
(gold) 2020

CEV Women's Champions League
(silver) 2022–23

FIVB Volleyball Women's Club World Championship
(bronze) 2022
(gold) 2023

Women's CEV Cup
(gold) 2021–22

=== International ===
Balkan Women's U19 Volleyball Championship
(silver) 2018

FIVB Volleyball Women's Nations League
(gold) 2023, 2026

Women's European Volleyball Championship
(gold) 2023, 2026

FIVB Women's Volleyball World Championship

(silver) 2025

Awards
Preceded by (Poland) Joanna Wołosz	Best Setter of Club World Championship; 2023	Succeeded by TBD
