= 2023 FIVB Volleyball Women's Club World Championship =

International women's volleyball club competition

2023 Women's Club World Championship

Tournament details
- Host country: China
- City: Hangzhou
- Dates: 13–17 December
- Teams: 6 (from 3 confederations)
- Venue: 1 (in 1 host city)

Final positions
- Champions: (Turkey) Eczacıbaşı Dynavit Istanbul (3rd title)
- Runners-up: (Turkey) VakıfBank Spor Kulubu
- Third place: (China) Tianjin Bohai Bank
- Fourth place: (Brazil) Dentil Praia Clube

Tournament awards
- MVP: (Serbia) Tijana Bošković
- Best Setter: (Turkey) Elif Şahin
- Best OH: (Brazil) Gabriela Guimarães (China) Li Yingying
- Best MB: (Turkey) Zehra Güneş (Serbia) Jovana Stevanović
- Best OPP: (Serbia) Tijana Bošković
- Best Libero: (Turkey) Ayça Aykaç

Tournament statistics
- Matches played: 10
- Attendance: 23,641 (2,364 per match)

The 2023 FIVB Volleyball Women's Club World Championship was the 16th edition of the competition. It was held in Hangzhou, China. The tournament took place from 13 to 17 December 2023.

Eczacıbaşı Dynavit Istanbul won their third title after defeating their archrivals VakıfBank Spor Kulubu in five-set match (3–2) in the final. VakıfBank Spor Kulubu settle for silver. Tianjin Bohai Bank claimed bronze and it's also their first medal of the tournament, defeating Dentil Praia Clube in four sets for the third place match. Tijana Bošković was named the MVP of the tournament.

This were Sport Center I first appearance at the Club World Championship.

== Qualification ==
Team (Confederation)	Qualified as
(China) Tianjin Bohai Bank (AVC)	Hosts
(Turkey) VakıfBank Spor Kulubu (CEV)	2023 European Champions
(Turkey) Eczacıbaşı Dynavit Istanbul (CEV)	2023 European runners-up
(Brazil) Dentil Praia Clube (CSV)	2023 South American Champions
(Brazil) Gerdau Minas (CSV)	2023 South American runners-up
(Vietnam) Sport Center I (AVC)	2023 Asian Champions

== Venue ==
All matches
Hangzhou, China
Yellow Dragon Sports Center
Capacity: 8,000
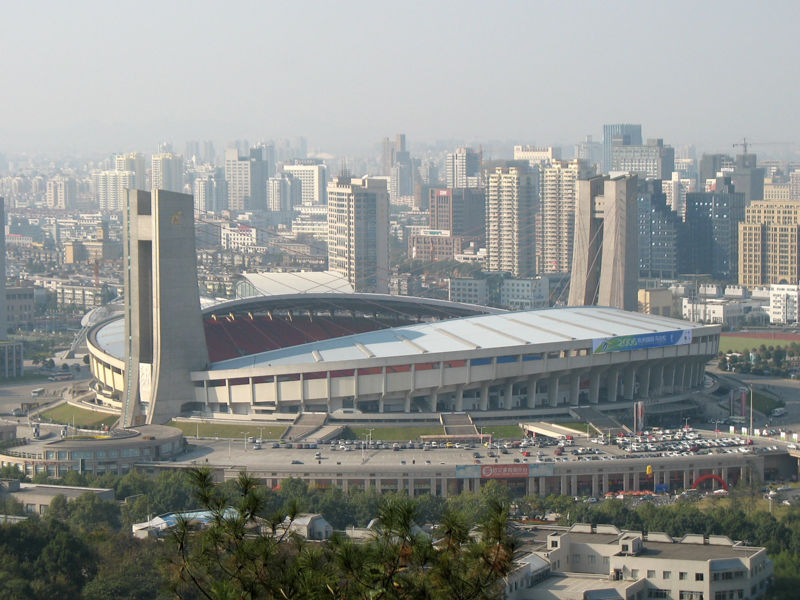

== Format ==
=== Preliminary round ===
Six teams are divided into two pools of three teams each in a round-robin match. The top two teams of each pool advance to the semifinals.

=== Final round ===
Semifinals
A1 vs. B2
B1 vs. A2

Finals
Gold match: SFW1 vs. SFW2
Bronze march: SFL1 vs. SFL2

== Pools composition ==
Pool A	Pool B
(Turkey) Eczacıbaşı Dynavit Istanbul	(Turkey) VakıfBank Spor Kulubu
(China) Tianjin Bohai Bank	(Vietnam) Sport Center I
(Brazil) Gerdau Minas	(Brazil) Dentil Praia Clube

== Pool standing procedure ==
1. Number of victories
2. Match points
3. Sets ratio
4. Points ratio
5. Result of the last match between the tied teams.

Match won 3–0 or 3–1: 3 match points for the winner and 0 match point for the loser.

Match won 3–2: 2 match points for the winner and 1 match point for the loser.

== Preliminary round ==
- All times are China Standard Time (UTC+08:00).

=== Pool A ===
Pos	Team	Pld	W	L	Pts	SW	SL	SR	SPW	SPL	SPR	Qualification
1	(Turkey) Eczacıbaşı Dynavit Istanbul	2	2	0	6	6	0	MAX	150	107	1.402	Semifinals
2	(China) Tianjin Bohai Bank	2	1	1	3	3	3	1.000	134	133	1.008	Semifinals
3	(Brazil) Gerdau Minas	2	0	2	0	0	6	0.000	106	150	0.707	

Source: Women's Club World Champs 2023 – Standings

Date	Time		Score		Set 1	Set 2	Set 3	Set 4	Set 5	Total	Report
13 Dec	19:30	Tianjin Bohai Bank (China)	3–0	(Brazil) Gerdau Minas	25–22	25–16	25–20			75–58	P2 Report
14 Dec	19:30	Eczacıbaşı Dynavit Istanbul (Turkey)	3–0	(Brazil) Gerdau Minas	25–19	25–11	25–18			75–48	P2 Report
15 Dec	19:30	Tianjin Bohai Bank (China)	0–3	(Turkey) Eczacıbaşı Dynavit Istanbul	17–25	23–25	19–25			59–75	P2 Report

=== Pool B ===
Pos	Team	Pld	W	L	Pts	SW	SL	SR	SPW	SPL	SPR	Qualification
1	(Turkey) VakıfBank Spor Kulubu	2	2	0	6	6	0	MAX	150	87	1.724	Semifinals
2	(Brazil) Dentil Praia Clube	2	1	1	3	3	3	1.000	126	132	0.955	Semifinals
3	(Vietnam) Sport Center I	2	0	2	0	0	6	0.000	95	152	0.625	

Source: Women's Club World Champs 2023 – Standings

Date	Time		Score		Set 1	Set 2	Set 3	Set 4	Set 5	Total	Report
13 Dec	14:00	VakıfBank Spor Kulubu (Turkey)	3–0	(Vietnam) Sport Center I	25–10	25–15	25–13			75–38	P2 Report
14 Dec	14:00	Dentil Praia Clube (Brazil)	3–0	(Vietnam) Sport Center I	25–10	25–22	27–25			77–57	P2 Report
15 Dec	14:00	VakıfBank Spor Kulubu (Turkey)	3–0	(Brazil) Dentil Praia Clube	25–16	25–14	25–19			75–49	P2 Report

== Final round ==
- All times are China Standard Time (UTC+08:00).

Semifinals
16 December
(Turkey) Eczacıbaşı	3
(Brazil) Praia	1
16 December
(Turkey) VakıfBank	3
(China) Tianjin	0

Final
17 December
(Turkey) Eczacıbaşı	3
(Turkey) VakıfBank	2
3rd place match
17 December
(Brazil) Praia	1
(China) Tianjin	3

=== Semifinals ===
Date	Time		Score		Set 1	Set 2	Set 3	Set 4	Set 5	Total	Report
16 Dec	14:00	Eczacıbaşı Dynavit Istanbul (Turkey)	3–1	(Brazil) Dentil Praia Clube	25–16	25–12	25–27	25–22		100–77	P2 Report
16 Dec	19:30	VakıfBank Spor Kulubu (Turkey)	3–0	(China) Tianjin Bohai Bank	25–16	25–23	25–23			75–62	P2 Report

=== 3rd place match ===
Date	Time		Score		Set 1	Set 2	Set 3	Set 4	Set 5	Total	Report
17 Dec	14:00	Dentil Praia Clube (Brazil)	1–3	(China) Tianjin Bohai Bank	23–25	20–25	25–17	19–25		87–92	P2 Report

=== Final ===
Date	Time		Score		Set 1	Set 2	Set 3	Set 4	Set 5	Total	Report
17 Dec	19:30	Eczacıbaşı Dynavit Istanbul (Turkey)	3–2	(Turkey) VakıfBank Spor Kulubu	19–25	25–23	25–23	23–25	15–9	107–105	P2 Report

== Final standing ==
Rank	Team
1st place, gold medalist(s)	(Turkey) Eczacıbaşı Dynavit Istanbul
2nd place, silver medalist(s)	(Turkey) VakıfBank Spor Kulubu
3rd place, bronze medalist(s)	(China) Tianjin Bohai Bank
4	(Brazil) Dentil Praia Clube
5	(Brazil) Gerdau Minas
6	(Vietnam) Sport Center I

Source: Women's CWC 2023 – Final Standings

2023 Club World champions
(Turkey)
Eczacıbaşı Dynavit Istanbul
Third title

Team
Tuna Aybüke Özel, Simge Şebnem Aköz, Tijana Bošković (c), Beyza Arıcı, Hande Baladın, Alexa Gray, Yaprak Erkek, Aydemir Akyol Naz, Elif Şahin, Jovana Stevanović, Irina Voronkova, Defne Başyolcu, Martyna Czyrniańska, Sinead Jack
Coach
(Turkey) Ferhat Akbaş

== Awards ==
- Most valuable player
  (Serbia) Tijana Bošković
- Best setter
  (Turkey) Elif Şahin
- Best outside spikers
  (Brazil) Gabriela Guimarães
  (China) Li Yingying
- Best middle blockers
  (Turkey) Zehra Güneş
  (Serbia) Jovana Stevanović
- Best opposite spiker
  (Serbia) Tijana Bošković
- Best libero
  (Turkey) Ayça Aykaç

== See also ==
- 2023 FIVB Volleyball Men's Club World Championship
