= Novitsky =

Novitsky (Russian: Новицкий; Ukrainian: Новицький; masculine) or Novitskaya (feminine) is a surname of Slavic origin. It may refer to:

- Craig Novitsky (born 1971), American football player
- Edward Novitski (1918–2006), American geneticist
- Evgeny Novitsky (born 1957), Russian entrepreneur
- Gennady Novitsky (born 1949), Prime Minister of Belarus
- Jeff Novitzky (born 1967), American administrator
- Mike Novitsky (born 1999), American football player
- Oleg Novitsky, Russian cosmonaut
- Pavel Novitsky (disambiguation)
- Sergei Novitski (born 1981), Russian ice dancer
- Vasily Fedorovich Novitsky, Russian general

== See also ==
- Novickis
- Nowicki
- Nowitzki (surname)
