= Liga Femenina de Voleibol Argentino =

Volleyball league

- Sport: Volleyball
- Founded: 1996
- First season: 1996–97; 30 years ago
- Administrator: FeVA
- No. of teams: 15 (2023)
- Country: Argentina
- Continent: South America
- Most recent champion: Gimnasia y Esgrima (LP) (5th. title)
- Most titles: Boca Juniors (8 titles)
- Broadcaster: DeporTV
- Level on pyramid: 1
- Relegation to: Second division
- Domestic cups: Argentine Cup; Argentine Super Cup
- International cup: South American Championship
- Website: feva.org.ar/liga-femenina

The Argentine Women's Volleyball League (Spanish: Liga Femenina de Voleibol Argentino) is the highest women 's professional volleyball league in Argentina . The champion team Qualifies to the South American Women's Volleyball Champion Clubs. Since 2003 it has been managed by Argentine Volleyball Federation (FeVA).

The current champion is Boca Juniors and it is also the team that won the tournament for the most times with a total of eight titles.

== History ==
The League has been managed by the FeVA since 2003. Since then, teams from various parts of the country have participated, even foreign teams, such as Bohemios from Uruguay in the 2007–08 season, Over the year, the number of participating teams has varied, reaching a maximum of 16 in 2013–14 and a minimum of 4 in 2011–12.

== Champions ==
- 1996–2003: championship organised by Federación Argentina de Voleibol

Ed.	Season	Champions	Final	Runners-Up	Ref.
1	1996–97	GEBA (1)	3–2	Boca Juniors	
2	1997–98	GEBA (2)	3–2	Boca Juniors	
3	1998–99	River Plate (1)	3–1	Hacoaj	
4	1999–00	Gimnasia y Esgrima (LP) (1)	3–0	Club Náutico Hacoaj	
5	2000–01	Gimnasia y Esgrima (LP) (2)	3–0	Asociación Bancaria	
6	2001–02	CUBA (1)	3–2	Gimnasia y Esgrima (LP)	(Note: Final with different rules.)
7	2002–03	Gimnasia y Esgrima (LP) (3)	3–1	Boca Juniors	
8	2003–04	GEBA (3)	2–0	Banco Nación	
9	2004–05	River Plate (2)	2–0	Gimnasia y Esgrima (LP)	
10	2005–06	River Plate (3)	3–1	Banco Nación	
11	2006–07	River Plate (4)	3–0	Banco Nación	
12	2007–08	Banco Nación (1)	3–1	Boca Juniors	
13	2008–09	Banco Nación (2)	3–1	Boca Juniors	
14	2009–10	Banco Nación (3)	3–0	Boca Juniors	
15	2010–11	Boca Juniors (1)	3–0	Bell Voley	
16	2011–12	Boca Juniors (2)	3–0	Estudiantes (Paraná)	
17	2012–13	Vélez Sarsfield (1)	3–0	Boca Juniors	
18	2013–14	Boca Juniors (3)	3–0	Vélez Sarsfield	
19	2014–15	Boca Juniors (4)	3–0	Villa Dora	
20	2015–16	Villa Dora (1)	3–1	Boca Juniors	
21	2017	Gimnasia y Esgrima (LP) (4)	2–0	Velez Sarsfield	
22	2018	Boca Juniors (5)	2–1	San Lorenzo	
23	2019	Boca Juniors (6)	2–1	San Lorenzo	
–	2020	(not held due to COVID-19 pandemic)			
24	2021	San Lorenzo (1)	2–1	Gimnasia y Esgrima (LP)	
25	2022	Boca Juniors (7)	2–1	Gimnasia y Esgrima (LP)	
26	2023	Boca Juniors (8)	2–0	San Lorenzo	
27	2024	CEF 5 (Note: Acronym for "Centro de Educación Física N° 5".)(1)	2–0	Estudiantes (LP)	
28	2025	Gimnasia y Esgrima (LP) (5)	3–0	Estudiantes (LP)	

== By Club ==
Club	Titles	Runners-up	Winning years
Boca Juniors	8	8	2010–11, 2011–12, 2013-14, 2014–15, 2018, 2019, 2021, 2022
Gimnasia y Esgrima (LP)	5	4	1999–00, 2000–01, 2002–03, 2017, 2025
River Plate	4	0	1998–99, 2004–05, 2005–06, 2006–07
Banco Nación	3	3	2007–08, 2008–09, 2009–10
GEBA	3	0	1996–97, 1997–98, 2003–04
San Lorenzo	1	3	2021
Vélez Sarsfield	1	2	2012–13
Villa Dora	1	1	2015–16
CUBA	1	0	
CEF 5	1	0	2024
Hacoaj	0	2	
Asociación Bancaria	0	1	
Bell Voley	0	1	
Estudiantes (Paraná)	0	1	
Estudiantes (LP)	0	2	
