= Novickis =

Family name

Novickis is a surname which is a rendering of the Slavic surname Nowicki/Novitsky/Navitski. In Latvian and Lithuanian, which require the suffix "-s"/"-is"/"-as" for nouns of masculine gender. In Lithuanian it may be also rendered as Navickis and Navickas.

Feminine forms:

- Novicka in Latvian
- Navickienė/Novickienė (married woman) Navickaitė/Novickaitė/Navickytė/Novickytė (unmarried woman) in Lithuanian

Notable people with the surname include:

- Alfons Novickis (1906–1931), Latvian footballer
- Monika Navickienė (born 1981), Lithuanian politician
- Voldemaras Novickis (1956–2022), Soviet/Lithuanian handball player
