= Nowitzki (surname) =

Nowitzki and Nowizki are Germanized forms of the Polish surname Nowicki, also spread across the Baltic region. Notable people with the name include:

- Dirk Nowitzki (born 1978), German basketball player
- Tamara Nowitzki (born 1976), Australian swimmer

== Fictional characters ==
- Ramona Nowitzki, a character from the sitcom The Big Bang Theory

== See also ==
- Novitsky
- Nowicki
