= Jovana Stevanović =

Serbian volleyball player

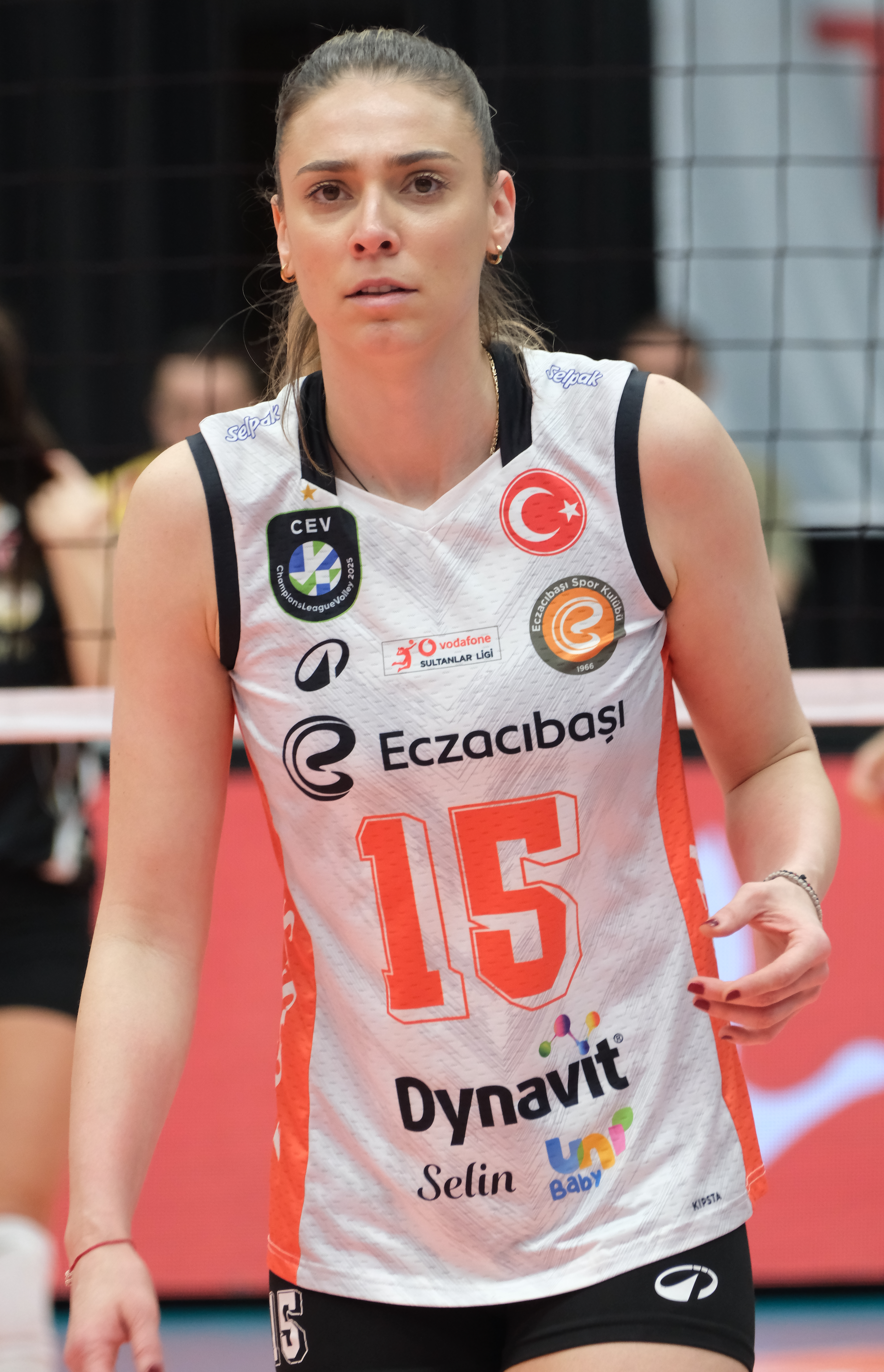
- Stevanović playing for Eczacıbaşı Dynavit

Personal information
- Nationality: Serbian
- Born: 30 June 1992 (age 34) Belgrade, Serbia, FR Yugoslavia
- Height: 1.92 m (6 ft 4 in)
- Weight: 72 kg (159 lb)
- Spike: 308 cm (121 in)
- Block: 295 cm (116 in)

Volleyball information
- Position: Middle blocker
- Number: 15

Career
- Years: Team
- 2008–2013: OK Crvena zvezda Belgrade
- 2013–2018: Pomi Casalmaggiore
- 2018–2020: Pallavolo Scandicci
- 2020–2022: Unet E-Work Busto Arsizio
- 2022–2023: Vero Volley Monza
- 2023-2025: Eczacıbaşı Dynavit
- 2025-2026: Olympiacos Piraeus
- 2026-: Gunma Green Wings .

National team
- Years: Team
- 2012, 2015–2018, 2022–2024: Serbia
Honours
Volleyball
Olympic Games
Silver medal – second place	2016 Rio de Janeiro	Team
World Championship
Gold medal – first place	2018 Japan	Team
Gold medal – first place	2022 Netherlands/Poland	Team
European Championship
Gold medal – first place	2017 Azerbaijan/Georgia
Silver medal – second place	2023 Belgium/Estonia/Germany/Italy
Bronze medal – third place	2015 Netherlands/Belgium
World Cup
Silver medal – second place	2015 Japan
FIVB World Grand Prix
Bronze medal – third place	2017 Nanjing
FIVB Nations League
Bronze medal – third place	2022 Ankara	Team
European Games
Bronze medal – third place	2015 Baku	Team
European League
Bronze medal – third place	2012 Karlovy Vary
Yeltsin Cup
Gold medal – first place	2017 Yekaterinburg
U19 World Championship
Silver medal – second place	2009 Thailand
Junior European Championship
Silver medal – second place	2010 Serbia
Youth European Championship
Silver medal – second place	2009 Netherlands
- Updated on 15 November 2025

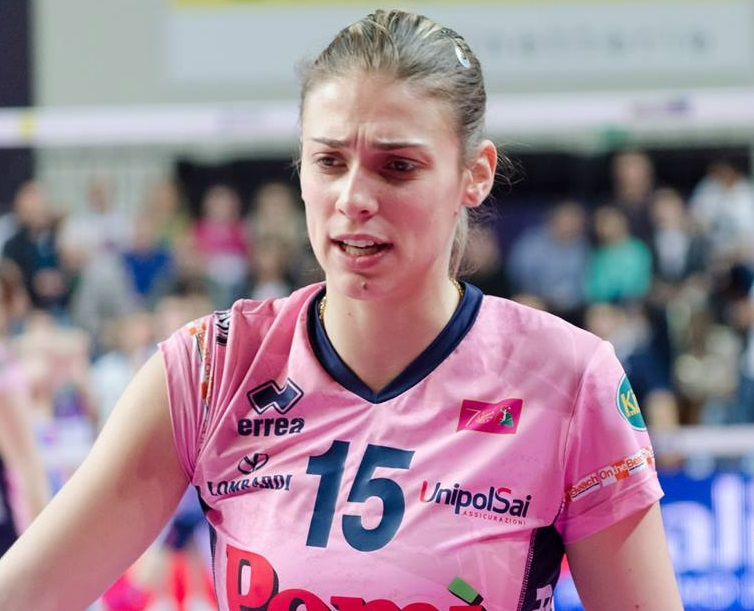
Stevanović playing for Casalmaggiore in May 2015

Jovana Stevanović (born 30 June 1992) is a Serbian professional volleyball player who won the 2016 Summer Olympics silver medal with the Serbia national team. Until 2022 she played for the Italian club Unet E-Work Busto Arsizio and until May 2023 for Vero Volley Monza. Then moved to the Turkish team Eczacıbaşı Dynavit for two seasons, 2023-2025. Her club for the season 2025-2026 was the Greek team Olympiacos SFP. The season 2026-2027 will show her in Japan, playing for Gunma Green Wings

== Career ==
2014/2015 – 'Scudetto' Winner of Women's Italian Volleyball Championship with Italian team Casalmaggiore

2015 – Supercup Winner of Women's Italian Volleyball Championship with Italian team Casalmaggiore.

2015/2016 – CEV Champions League Winner and competition Best Middle Blocker with Italian team Casalmaggiore

2016 – Silver medal at the 2016 Summer Olympics with the Serbian National team and silver medal at the 2016 FIVB Volleyball Women's Club World Championship with Italian team Casalmaggiore. She was selected to play the Italian League All-Star game in 2017.

== Awards ==
=== National team ===
==== Junior team ====
- 2009 Youth European Volleyball Championship – Silver medal
- 2009 U19 World Championship – Silver medal
- 2010 Junior European Championship – Silver medal

==== National team ====
- 2012 European League – Bronze Medal
- 2015 European games – Bronze Medal
- 2015 World Cup – Silver Medal
- 2015 European Championship – Bronze Medal
- 2016 Olympic Games – Silver Medal
- 2017 Yeltsin Cup – Gold Medal
- 2017 World Grand Prix – Bronze Medal
- 2017 European Championship – Gold Medal
- 2018 World Championship – Gold Medal
- 2022 Nations League – Bronze Medal
- 2022 World Championship – Gold Medal
- 2023 European Championship – Silver Medal

=== Club ===
Serbian Cup

- 2008–09 Serbian Cup – Runner-Up, with OK Crvena Zvezda
- 2009–10 Serbian Cup – Champion, with OK Crvena Zvezda
- 2010–11 Serbian Cup – Champion, with OK Crvena Zvezda
- 2011–12 Serbian Cup – Champion, with OK Crvena Zvezda
- 2012–13 Serbian Cup – Champion, with OK Crvena Zvezda

Serbian Superleague

- 2008–09 Serbian Superleague – Runner-Up, with OK Crvena Zvezda
- 2009–10 Serbian Superleague – Champion, with OK Crvena Zvezda
- 2010–11 Serbian Superleague – Champion, with OK Crvena Zvezda
- 2011–12 Serbian Superleague – Champion, with OK Crvena Zvezda
- 2012–13 Serbian Superleague – Champion, with OK Crvena Zvezda

Italian Serie A1

- 2014–15 Italian Serie A1 – Champion, with Pomì Casalmaggiore
- 2018–19 Italian Serie A1 – Bronze medal, with Savino Del Bene Scandicci
- 2022–23 Italian Serie A1 – Runner-Up, with Vero Volley Milano

Italian Cup

- 2015–16 Cup – Bronze medal, with Pomì Casalmaggiore
- 2018–19 Cup – Bronze medal, with Savino Del Bene Scandicci
- 2021–22 Cup – Bronze medal, with Unet E-Work Busto Arsizio
- 2022–23 Cup – Runner-Up, with Vero Volley Milano

Italian Supercup

- 2015 Supercup – Champion, with Pomì Casalmaggiore
- 2020 Superup – Runner-Up, with Unet E-Work Busto Arsizio

Turkish League

- 2023–24 Turkish Volleyball League – Runner-Up, with Eczacıbaşı Dynavit

CEV Cup

- 2009–10 CEV Cup – Runner-Up, with Crvena Zvezda Beograd
- 2010–11 CEV Cup – Bronze medal, with Crvena Zvezda Beograd
- 2016–17 CEV Cup – Bronze medal, with Pomì Casalmaggiore

CEV Champions League

- 2015–16 CEV Champions League – Champion, with Pomì Casalmaggiore
- 2020–21 CEV Champions League – Bronze medal, with Unet E-Work Busto Arsizio

FIVB Volleyball Club World Championship

- 2016 Club World Championship – Runner-Up, with Pomì Casalmaggiore
- 2023 Club World Championship – Champion, with Eczacıbaşı Dynavit

=== Individual Awards (awarded) ===
==== National team ====
- 2022 FIVB Nations League "Best middle blocker"

==== Club ====
- 2013–14 Italian Volley League A1 "Best middle blocker"
- 2015–16 Italian Volley League A1 "Best middle blocker"
- 2015–16 CEV Women's Champions League "Best middle blocker"
- 2023 FIVB Club World Championship "Best middle blocker"

=== Individual awards (not awarded) ===
==== Club ====
- 2012/13 Serbian Cup – Best middle blocker

=== Individual achievements ===
- 2023 OSS Best Female Volleyball Player of the Year

== Personal life ==
She is the daughter of ex football player and coach Goran Stevanović and sister of ex footballer Anđelo Stevanović.

Awards
Preceded by (Turkey) Eda Erdem and (Brazil) Carol Gattaz	Best Middle Blocker of FIVB Nations League; 2022 (with (Brazil) Ana Carolina da Silva)	Succeeded by (Turkey) Zehra Güneş and (China) Yuan Xinyue
Preceded by (United States) Chiaka Ogbogu and (Turkey) Zehra Güneş	Best Middle Blocker of FIVB Club World Championship; 2023 (with (Turkey) Zehra Güneş)	Succeeded by TBD
