= 2024 Women's South American Volleyball Club Championship =

16th official edition of the Women's South American Volleyball Club Championship

2024 Women's South American Club Championship
Tournament details
- Host country: Brazil
- Dates: 14 to 18 Feb
- Teams: 6
- Venue: 1 (in 1 host city)

Final positions
- Champions: (Brazil) Gerdau Minas (5th title)

Tournament awards
- MVP: (Brazil) Julia Kudiess

The 2024 Women's South American Volleyball Club Championship was the 37th official edition of the Women's South American Volleyball Club Championship, played by six teams from February 14 to February 18, 2024, in Bauru, Brazil.

Gerdau Minas won its fifth and overall title, and qualified for the 2024 FIVB Volleyball Women's Club World Championship.

== Teams ==
Pool
(Bolivia) San Martín
(Brazil) Gerdau Minas
(Brazil) Praia
(Brazil) SESI Bauru
(Peru) Regatas Lima
(Uruguay) Atlético Barbato

== Preliminary round ==
=== Group A ===
Pos	Team	Pld	W	L	Pts	SW	SL	SR	SPW	SPL	SPR	Qualification
1	(Brazil) Praia	2	2	0	6	6	0	MAX	150	75	2.000	Semifinals
2	(Peru) Regatas Lima	2	1	1	3	3	3	1.000	122	133	0.917	Semifinals
3	(Uruguay) Atlético Barbato	2	0	2	0	0	6	0.000	86	150	0.573	

Date		Score		Set 1	Set 2	Set 3	Set 4	Set 5	Total
14 Feb	Praia (Brazil)	3–0	(Uruguay) Atlético Barbato	25–12	25–9	25–7			75–28
15 Feb	Regatas Lima (Peru)	3–0	(Uruguay) Atlético Barbato	25–18	25–20	25–20			75–58
16 Feb	Praia (Brazil)	3–1	(Peru) Regatas Lima	25–15	25–18	25–14			75–47

=== Group B ===
Pos	Team	Pld	W	L	Pts	SW	SL	SR	SPW	SPL	SPR	Qualification
1	(Brazil) Gerdau Minas	2	2	0	6	6	1	6.000	169	138	1.225	Semifinals
2	(Brazil) SESI Bauru	2	1	1	3	4	3	1.333	160	118	1.356	Semifinals
3	(Bolivia) San Martín	2	0	2	0	0	6	0.000	67	150	0.447	

Date		Score		Set 1	Set 2	Set 3	Set 4	Set 5	Total
14 Feb	SESI Bauru (Brazil)	3–0	(Bolivia) San Martín	25–7	25–5	25–12			75–24
15 Feb	SESI Bauru (Brazil)	1–3	(Brazil) Gerdau Minas	19–25	25–18	24–26	17–25		85–94
16 Feb	Gerdau Minas (Brazil)	3–0	(Bolivia) San Martín	25–10	25–13	25–20			75–43

== Final round ==
=== Bracket ===
Semifinals
17 February
(Brazil) Praia	3
(Brazil) SESI Bauru	0
17 February
(Brazil) Gerdau Minas	3
(Peru) Regatas Lima	0

Final
18 February
(Brazil) Praia	2
(Brazil) Gerdau Minas	3
3rd place
18 February
(Brazil) SESI Bauru	3
(Peru) Regatas Lima	1

=== Fifth place match ===
Date		Score		Set 1	Set 2	Set 3	Set 4	Set 5	Total
17 Feb	Atlético Barbato (Uruguay)	3–2	(Bolivia) San Martín	25–23	23–25	25–21	20–25	15–9	108–103

=== Semifinals ===
Date		Score		Set 1	Set 2	Set 3	Set 4	Set 5	Total
17 Feb	Gerdau Minas (Brazil)	3–0	(Peru) Regatas Lima	25–15	25–21	25–21			75–57
17 Feb	Praia (Brazil)	3–0	(Brazil) SESI Bauru	25–20	25–19	25–19			75–58

=== Third place match ===
Date		Score		Set 1	Set 2	Set 3	Set 4	Set 5	Total
18 Feb	SESI Bauru (Brazil)	3–1	(Peru) Regatas Lima	25–21	25–15	21–25	25–21		96–82

=== Final ===
Date		Score		Set 1	Set 2	Set 3	Set 4	Set 5	Total
18 Feb	Gerdau Minas (Brazil)	3–2	(Brazil) Praia	24–26	16–25	25–19	25–22	15–11	105–103

== Final standing ==
Rank	Team
1st place, gold medalist(s)	(Brazil) Gerdau Minas
2nd place, silver medalist(s)	(Brazil) Praia
3rd place, bronze medalist(s)	(Brazil) SESI Bauru
4	(Peru) Regatas Lima
5	(Uruguay) Atlético Barbato
6	(Bolivia) San Martín

Qualified for the 2024 FIVB Volleyball Women's Club World Championship

2024 Women's South American Volleyball Club Championship

Gerdau Minas
5th title

== All-Star team ==
The following players were chosen for the tournament's "All-Star team":

- Most valuable player
  - (Brazil) Julia Kudiess (Gerdau Minas)
- Best Opposite
  - (Brazil) Monique (Gerdau Minas)
- Best outside hitters
  - (Russia) Sofya Kuznetsova (Praia)
  - (Brazil) Pri Daroit (Gerdau Minas)
- Best setter
  - (Brazil) Dani Lins (SESI Bauru)
- Best libero
  - (Brazil) Natinha (Praia)
- Best middle blockers
  - (Brazil) Thaísa Menezes (Gerdau Minas)
  - (Brazil) Mayany (SESI Bauru)

== See also ==
- 2024 Men's South American Volleyball Club Championship
