= Zehra Güneş =

Turkish volleyball player (born 1999)

- Zehra Güneş in 2026

Personal information
- Full name: Zehra Güneş
- Born: 7 July 1999 (age 27) Kartal, Istanbul, Turkey
- Height: 1.97 m (6 ft 6 in)
- Spike: 320 cm (126 in)
- Block: 310 cm (122 in)

Volleyball information
- Position: Middle Blocker
- Current club: (Turkey) Vakıfbank Istanbul
- Number: 18

Career
- Years: Team
- 2011–2014: (Turkey) Vakıfbank Istanbul
- 2014–2015: (Turkey) Istanbul BBSK
- 2015–2016: (Turkey) Vakıfbank Istanbul
- 2016–2017: (Turkey) Beşiktaş J.K.
- 2017–: (Turkey) Vakıfbank Istanbul

National team
- Years: Team
- 2015–2016: Turkey U18
- 2016–2017: Turkey U20
- 2017–2018: Turkey U23
- 2018–: Turkey
Honours
Women's volleyball
Representing Turkey
FIVB World Championship
Silver medal – second place	2025 Thailand	Team
FIVB Nations League
Gold medal – first place	2023 Arlington	Team
Gold medal – first place	2026 Macau	Team
Silver medal – second place	2018 Nanjing	Team
Bronze medal – third place	2021 Rimini	Team
European Championships
Gold medal – first place	2023 Belgium/Estonia/Germany/Italy	Team
Gold medal – first place	2026 Azerbaijan/Czech Republic/Sweden/Turkey	Team
Silver medal – second place	2019 Turkey	Team
Bronze medal – third place	2021 Serbia/Bulgaria/Croatia/Romania	Team
Women's U23 World Championship
Gold medal – first place	2017 Ljubljana	Team

Zehra Güneş (Turkish pronunciation: [zɛhɾ̞ɑː ɟyˈneʃ]; born 7 July 1999) is a Turkish professional volleyball player. She plays in the middle blocker position. Currently, she plays for Vakıfbank Istanbul and is a member of the Turkey women's national volleyball team.

== Playing career ==
=== Club ===
In the 2016–17 Turkish Women's Volleyball League season, Zehra Güneş was loaned out to Beşiktaş J.K., another women's volleyball team. The next season, she returned to her home club. She enjoyed her first league champion title in the 2017–18 season with Vakıfbank Istanbul. She was awarded the "Vestel Special Prize" of the 2017–18 Vestel Venus Sultans League, which is the Turkish top-level volleyball league sponsored by Vestel.

She participated at the 2017–18 CEV Women's Champions League with her team Vakıfbank Istanbul, which became champion.

It was announced that Zehra Güneş would be the new Captain of Vakifbank for the 2024–25 Season

=== International ===
Zehra Güneş played at the 2015 European Youth Summer Olympic Festival held in Georgia. She took part at the 2015 FIVB Volleyball Girls' U18 World Championship in Peru, and was awarded the Best Middle Blocker title. Zehra Güneş played at the 2016 FIVB World Grand Prix. She was a member of the Turkey women's U20 team that took part in the 2017 FIVB Volleyball Women's U20 World Championship in Mexico, where she was named one of the Best Middle Blockers. She played for the Turkey women's U23 team at the 2017 FIVB Volleyball Women's U23 World Championship in Slovenia, where her team won a champion title.

In January 2017, she was invited to the Turkey women's team; she was admitted to the team in March 2018. She played at the very first 2018 FIVB Volleyball Women's Nations League as part of the Turkish team, which won silver. She was also part of the Turkish squad at the 2020 Tokyo Summer Olympics, which finished in fifth place.

In 2023, Günes was a part of the 14 player roster that won the Volleyball Nations League. She contributed 14 points to help Turkey defeat USA 3–1, and 9 points in the 3–1 victory against China for Gold. She was later recognized as the best Middle Blocker of the tournament

She also helped Turkey achieve their first European Championship in 2023, and was recognized as one of the best Middle Blockers of the tournament.

Güneş was once again named to the Paris 2024 Olympic Roster. The team was able to advance to the semi finals and finishing 4th place

== Personal life ==
Güneş is of Bosniak descent on both her mother's and father's sides. Her sisters, İrem Nur and Mina, are also volleyball players.

== Honours ==
=== VakıfBank S.K. ===
Turkish Women's Volleyball League

- 2017–18 Turkish Women's Volleyball League - Gold Medal
- 2018–19 Turkish Women's Volleyball League - Gold Medal
- 2020–21 Turkish Women's Volleyball League - Gold Medal
- 2021–22 Turkish Women's Volleyball League - Gold Medal
- 2024–25 Turkish Women's Volleyball League - Gold Medal
- 2025–26 Turkish Women's Volleyball League - Gold Medal

Turkish Women's Volleyball Cup

- 2017–18 Turkish Women's Volleyball Cup - Champion
- 2020–21 Turkish Women's Volleyball Cup - Champion
- 2021–22 Turkish Women's Volleyball Cup - Champion
- 2022–23 Turkish Women's Volleyball Cup - Champion
- 2025–26 Turkish Women's Volleyball Cup - Champion

Turkish Women's Volleyball Super Cup

- 2017 Turkish Super Cup - Champion
- 2018 Turkish Super Cup - Runner-Up
- 2019 Turkish Super Cup - Runner-Up
- 2020 Turkish Super Cup - Runner-Up
- 2021 Turkish Super Cup - Champion
- 2022 Turkish Super Cup - Runner-Up
- 2023 Turkish Super Cup - Champion
- 2025 Turkish Super Cup - Runner-Up
- 2026 Turkish Super Cup - Champion

FIVB Women's Volleyball Club World Championship

- 2017 FIVB Club World Championship - Gold Medal
- 2018 FIVB Club World Championship - Gold Medal
- 2019 FIVB Club World Championship - Bronze Medal
- 2021 FIVB Club World Championship - Gold Medal
- 2022 FIVB Volleyball Women's Club World Championship - Silver Medal
- 2023 FIVB Volleyball Women's Club World Championship - Silver Medal

CEV Women's Champions League

- 2017–18 CEV Women's Champions League - Gold Medal
- 2020–21 CEV Women's Champions League - Silver Medal
- 2021–22 CEV Women's Champions League - Gold Medal
- 2022–23 CEV Women's Champions League - Gold Medal
- 2025–26 CEV Women's Champions League - Gold Medal

=== National team ===
- 2017 U23 World Championship - Gold Medal
- 2018 Nations League - Silver Medal
- 2019 European Championship - Silver Medal
- 2021 Nations League - Bronze Medal
- 2021 European Championship - Bronze Medal
- 2023 Nations League - Gold Medal
- 2023 European Championship - Gold Medal
- 2025 FIVB Women's Volleyball World Championship - Silver Medal
- 2026 Nations League - Gold Medal
- 2026 European Championship - Gold Medal

=== Individual ===
Most Valuable Player

- 2021–22 Turkish Women's Volleyball League

Best Middle Blocker

- 2015 FIVB Volleyball Girls' U18 World Championship
- 2017 FIVB Volleyball Women's U20 World Championship
- 2019 FIVB Women's Club World Championship
- 2021 FIVB Women's Club World Championship
- 2022 FIVB Volleyball Women's Club World Championship
- 2023 FIVB Women's Nations League
- 2023 FIVB Volleyball Women's Club World Championship
- 2026 Women's European Volleyball Championship

Vestel Special Prize

- 2017–18 Vestel Venus Sultans League

Awards
Preceded by (Serbia) Jovana Stevanović and (Brazil) Ana Carolina da Silva	Best Middle Blocker of FIVB Nations League; 2023 (with (China) Yuan Xinyue)	Succeeded by TBD
Preceded by (United States) Chiaka Ogbogu and (Turkey) Zehra Güneş	Best Middle Blocker of FIVB Club World Championship; 2023 (with (Serbia) Jovana Stevanović)	Succeeded by TBD
