= Songül Dikmen =

Turkish volleyball player (born 1981)

Personal information
- Full name: Songül Dikmen Gürsoytrak
- Born: May 8, 1981 (age 45); Ankara, Turkey
- Height: 1.73 m (5 ft 8 in)

Volleyball information
- Position: Libero

National team
2007-present	Turkey
Honours
Women's volleyball

Songül Dikmen Gürsoytrak (born 8 May 1981) is a Turkish volleyball player. She is 173 cm (68 in) tall and plays as libero who is currently free agent and last played for Fenerbahçe Acıbadem. She also played for İller Bankası, Emlak Toki, Gaziantep Şahinbey Bld. and Konya Ereğli. Songül won Turkish League, Cup and Super Cup championship with Fenerbahçe Acıbadem in 2009–10 season.

Songül Dikmen won the bronze medal at the 2010–11 CEV Champions League with Fenerbahçe Acıbadem.

== Awards ==
=== Clubs ===
- 2009-10 Aroma Women's Volleyball League - Champion, with Fenerbahçe Acıbadem
- 2009-10 Turkish Cup - Runner-Up, with Fenerbahçe Acıbadem
- 2010 Turkish Super Cup - Champion, with Fenerbahçe Acıbadem
- 2009-10 CEV Champions League - Runner-Up, with Fenerbahçe Acıbadem
- 2010 FIVB World Club Championship - Champion, with Fenerbahçe Acıbadem
- 2010-11 CEV Champions League - Bronze medal, with Fenerbahçe Acıbadem
- 2010-11 Aroma Women's Volleyball League - Champion, with Fenerbahçe Acıbadem

== See also ==
- Turkish women in sports
