= Nowice =

Nowice may refer to the following places in Poland:

- Nowice, Lower Silesian Voivodeship (south-west Poland)
- Nowice, West Pomeranian Voivodeship (north-west Poland)
