= Pavel Novitsky =

Pavel Novitsky or Pavel Novitskiy may refer to:

- Pavel Novitskiy (b. 1989), Russian soccer player
- Pavel Novitsky (admiral) (1857–1917), Russian admiral
- Pavel Novitsky (art critic) (1888–1971), Soviet art, theatre, literary and architecture critic and pedagogue
