= Thaísa Daher de Menezes =

Brazilian volleyball player (born 1987)

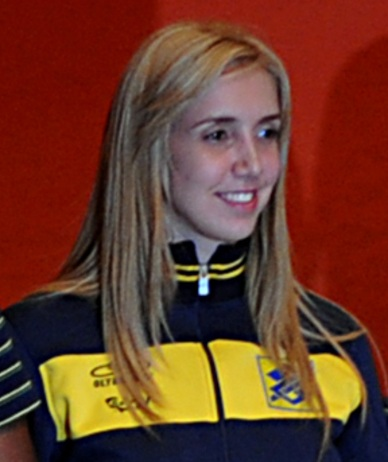
- Menezes in 2010

Personal information
- Full name: Thaísa Daher de Menezes
- Born: 15 May 1987 (age 39) Rio de Janeiro, Brazil
- Height: 1.96 m (6 ft 5 in)
- Spike: 318 cm (125 in)
- Block: 308 cm (121 in)

Volleyball information
- Position: Middle blocker
- Current club: (Brazil) Minas Tênis Clube
- Number: 6

National team
- Years: Team
- 2005–18, 2023–24: Brazil
Honours
Women's volleyball
Representing Brazil
Olympic Games
Gold medal – first place	2008 Beijing	Team
Gold medal – first place	2012 London	Team
Bronze medal – third place	2024 Paris	Team
World Championship
Silver medal – second place	2010 Japan	Team
Bronze medal – third place	2014 Italy	Team
World Cup
Silver medal – second place	2007 Japan	Team
World Grand Champions Cup
Silver medal – second place	2009 Japan	Team
Gold medal – first place	2013 Japan	Team
World Grand Prix
Gold medal – first place	2005 Sendai	Team
Gold medal – first place	2006 Reggio Calabria	Team
Gold medal – first place	2008 Yokohama	Team
Gold medal – first place	2014 Tokyo	Team
Gold medal – first place	2016 Bangkok	Team
Silver medal – second place	2010 Ningbo	Team
Silver medal – second place	2012 Ningbo	Team
Pan American Games
Gold medal – first place	2011 Guadalajara	Team
Silver medal – second place	2007 Rio de Janeiro	Team
Pan-American Cup
Gold medal – first place	2009 Miami	Team
Gold medal – first place	2011 Ciudad Juárez	Team
South American Championship
Gold medal – first place	2007 Santiago	Team
Gold medal – first place	2009 Porto Alegre	Team
Gold medal – first place	2011 Callao	Team
Gold medal – first place	2013 Ica	Team
Gold medal – first place	2023 Recife	Team

Thaísa Daher de Menezes (Portuguese pronunciation: [taˈizɐ daˈɛʁ dʒi meˈnezis]; born 15 May 1987) is a Brazilian professional volleyball player. She won back-to-back gold medals at the 2008 and 2012 Summer Olympics.

Menezes has won numerous Best Spiker and Best Blocker Awards, and is widely acclaimed as one of the greatest Middle blockers of all time.

== Biography ==
Menezes was born in the Campo Grande district, located in the western part of Rio de Janeiro. Her father is former serviceman Domingos de Menezes and her mother, Monica Daher, is a descendant of immigrants from Lebanon. Until the age of 13, Thaísa was engaged in swimming, but then, following the example of her brother Tiago, she switched to volleyball.

A year later, she was accepted into the youth team of the Tizhuk club, where Julio Cugna, one of the best mentors for working with young athletes, became her coach. In 2002, Menezes was invited to the Minas team (Belo Horizonte)- one of the strongest in Brazil, with which she won her first club level medal that same season, becoming the silver medalist of the Brazilian championship. In the same 2002 (at the age of 15), Menezes made her debut in two teams of her country at once, youth and junior, becoming the champion of two championships of South America with them. A year later, the volleyball player became the world champion both among youth teams and among juniors.

== Career ==
Menezes was part of the Brazilian team that won the gold medal at the 2008 Summer Olympics.

Menezes won a silver medal with Sollys Osasco at the 2010 FIVB World Club Championship. She also earned the Best Spiker award.

At the 2011 Pan-American Cup, Menezes was given the Best Blocker award, and also won a gold medal with her national team.

Menezes was part of the national team who won a gold medal at the 2011 Pan American Games held in Guadalajara, Mexico.

In the 2012 FIVB World Grand Prix, Menezes won a silver medal with her national team and the individual award of Best Blocker.

Menezes was part of the national team which won a gold medal at the 2012 Olympic Games held in London, UK.

Playing with Sollys Nestlé Osasco, Menezes won a gold medal and the Best Spiker award in the 2012 FIVB Club World Championship held in Doha, Qatar.

Menezes claimed the silver medal in the 2014 FIVB Club World Championship, playing with Molico Osasco, where her team lost 0–3 to the Russian Dinamo Kazan the championship match. She was named Best Team as Best Middle Blocker at the championship.

Menezes played with her national team, winning a bronze medal at the 2014 World Championship when her team defeated Italy 3–2 in the bronze medal match.

Menezes retired from the national team in 2018. In 2023, she announced her return to the team and played in the 2023 FIVB Volleyball Women's Nations League as well as the Olympic qualifying tournament. She was part of Brazil's roster in the 2024 Paris Olympics. After winning bronze in the 2024 Olympics, she announced her retirement once again.

== Clubs ==
- (Brazil) Minas Tênis Clube (2002–2005)
- (Brazil) Rio de Janeiro Vôlei Clube (2005–2008)
- (Brazil) Osasco Voleibol Clube (2008–2016)
- (Turkey) Eczacıbaşı VitrA (2016–2018)
- (Brazil) Hinode Barueri (2018–2019)
- (Brazil) Minas Tênis Clube (2019–)

== Awards ==
=== Individual ===
- 2010 FIVB Club World Championship – "Best Spiker"
- 2011 Pan-American Cup – "Best Blocker"
- 2011 FIVB World Grand Prix – "Best Server"
- 2012 Summer Olympics South American qualification – "Best Blocker"
- 2012 FIVB World Grand Prix – "Best Blocker"
- 2012 South American Club Championship – "Best Blocker"
- 2013 FIVB Club World Championship – "Best Spiker"
- 2013 FIVB World Grand Prix – "Most Valuable Player"
- 2013 FIVB World Grand Prix – "Best Middle Blocker"
- 2013–2014 Brazilian Superliga – "Best Blocker"
- 2014 FIVB World Championship – "Best Middle Blocker"
- 2014 FIVB Club World Championship – "Best Middle Blocker"
- 2016 FIVB World Grand Prix – "Best Middle Blocker"
- 2020 South American Club Championship – "Most Valuable Player"
- 2021–2022 Brazilian Superliga – "Best Middle Blocker"
- 2022–2023 Brazilian Superliga – "Best Middle Blocker"
- 2023 South American Championship – "Best Middle Blocker"

=== Clubs ===
- 2005–06 Brazilian Superliga – Champion, with Rexona-Ades
- 2006–07 Brazilian Superliga – Champion, with Rexona-Ades
- 2007–08 Brazilian Superliga – Champion, with Rexona-Ades
- 2009–10 Brazilian Superliga – Champion, with Sollys Osasco
- 2011–12 Brazilian Superliga – Champion, with Sollys Osasco
- 2020–21 Brazilian Superliga – Champion, with Itambé/Minas
- 2021–22 Brazilian Superliga – Champion, with Itambé/Minas
- 2022–23 Brazilian Superliga – Runner-up, with Gerdau/Minas
- 2023–24 Brazilian Superliga – Champion, with Gerdau/Minas
- 2009 South American Club Championship – Champion, with Molico Osasco
- 2010 South American Club Championship – Champion, with Molico Osasco
- 2011 South American Club Championship – Champion, with Molico Osasco
- 2012 South American Club Championship – Champion, with Molico Osasco
- 2014 South American Club Championship – Runner-up, with Molico Osasco
- 2015 South American Club Championship – Runner-up, with Molico Osasco
- 2020 South American Club Championship – Champion, with Itambé/Minas
- 2024 South American Club Championship – Runner-up, with Gerdau/Minas
- 2024 South American Club Championship – Champion, with Gerdau/Minas
- 2010 FIVB Club World Championship – Runner-up, with Sollys Osasco
- 2012 FIVB Club World Championship – Champion, with Sollys Nestlé Osasco
- 2014 FIVB Club World Championship – Runner-up, with Molico Osasco
- 2016 FIVB Club World Championship – Champion, with Eczacıbaşı VitrA

Awards
Preceded by Unknown (Croatia) Nataša Osmokrović	Best Spiker of FIVB Club World Championship; 2010; 2012	Succeeded by (Croatia) Nataša Osmokrović; Not awarded
Preceded by (China) Wang Yimei	Best Server of FIVB World Grand Prix; 2011	Succeeded by (Turkey) Neslihan Demir
Preceded by (Russia) Iuliia Morozova - (Brazil) Juciely Barreto (United States) Christa Harmotto	Best Blocker/Middle Blocker; FIVB World Grand Prix; 2012; 2013 ex aequo (Serbia) Milena Rašić; 2016 ex aequo (United States) Rachael Adams	Succeeded by (Brazil) Fabiana Claudino (Russia) Irina Fetisova - (Brazil) Ana Beatriz Corrêa (Serbia) Milena Rašić
Preceded by (United States) Megan Hodge	Most Valuable Player of FIVB World Grand Prix; 2013	Succeeded by (Japan) Yūko Sano
