= Julia Nowicka =

Polish volleyball player (born 1998)

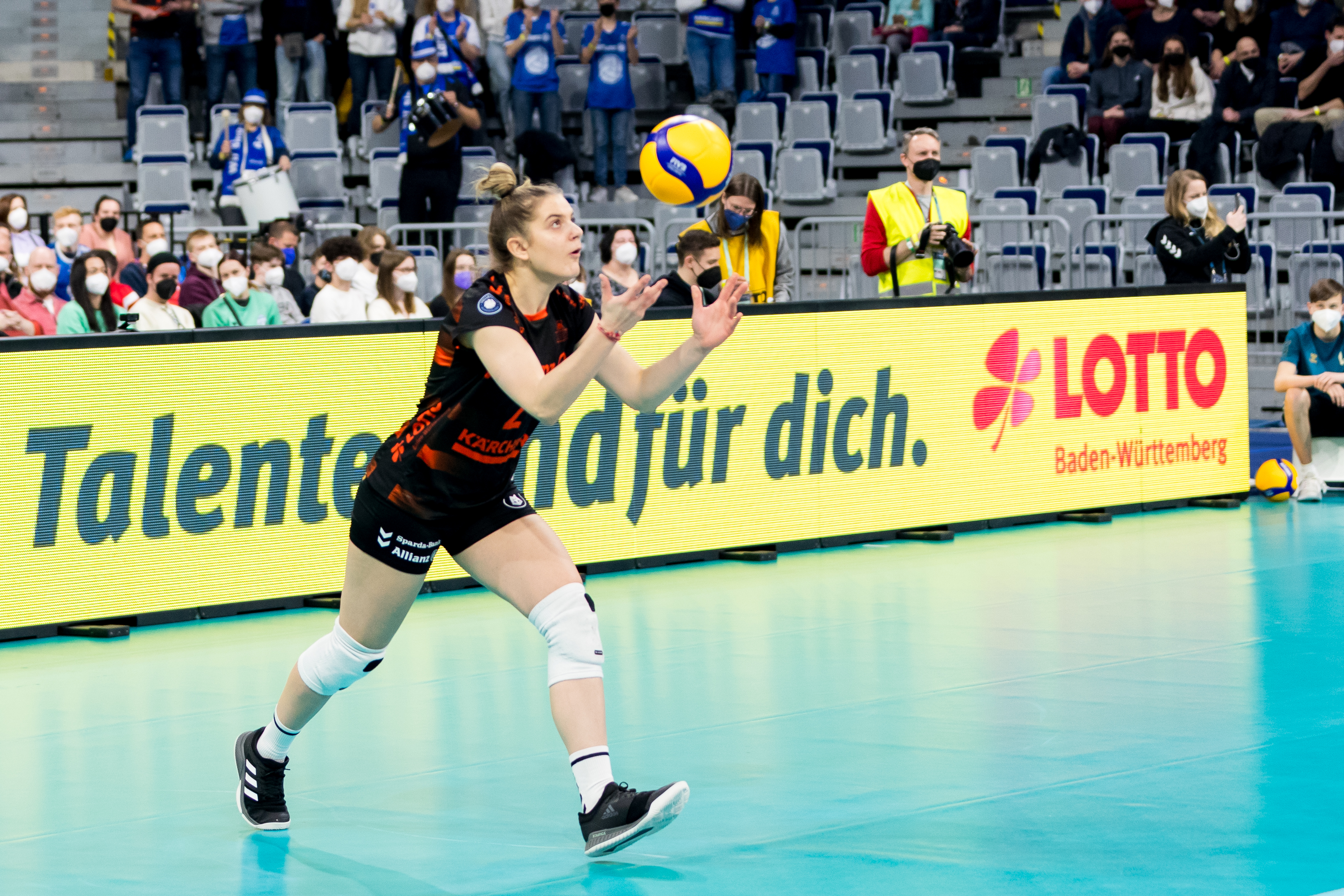
- Julia Nowicka in a volleyball game in 2022

Personal information
- Full name: Julia Iwona Nowicka
- Nationality: Polish
- Born: 21 October 1998 (age 28)
- Height: 174 cm (69 in)
- Weight: 58 kg (128 lb)
- Spike: 295 cm (116 in)
- Block: 278 cm (109 in)

Volleyball information
- Position: Setter
- Number: 1 (national team)

Career
Years	Teams
2015-2019	(Poland) BKS Bielsko-Biała
2019-2021	(Poland) Grot Budowlani Łódź
2021-2022	(Germany) MTV Stuttgart
2022-2025	(Poland) BKS Bielsko-Biała
2025-	(Brazil) Minas Tênis Clube

National team
2015-	Poland
Honours
Women's volleyball
Representing Poland
FIVB Nations League
Bronze medal – third place	2023 Arlington	Team
Bronze medal – third place	2024 Bangkok	Team

Julia Iwona Nowicka (born 21 October 1998) is a Polish volleyball player. She is part of the Poland women's national volleyball team and a member of the Brazilian club Minas Tênis Clube.

She participated in the 2015 FIVB Volleyball Girls' U18 World Championship, 2017 FIVB Volleyball Women's U20 World Championship, 2018 FIVB Volleyball Women's Nations League, and 2019 Montreux Volley Masters. On club level she played for BKS Profi Credit Bielsko Biala.
