= Marta Nowicka =

- Born: Westminster, London
- Citizenship: British
- Education: Kingston University
- Occupations: Interior architect; Interior design
- Years active: 1988-present
- Organization: DOMstay
- Known for: Interior architecture
- Television: Ugly House to Lovely House with George Clarke
- Awards: AJ Retrofit Award
- Website: Official profile

Marta Nowicka is a Polish-British interior architect, property developer, and academic, known for her designs in adaptive re-use architecture. Her work encompasses many projects, including residential and commercial spaces that focus on building re-use and site-specific designs. She is a recipient of the Architects' Journal (AJ) Retrofit Award.

== Early life and education ==
Marta Nowicka was born to a first-generation immigrant Polish family in 1964 in Westminster, London. Her father, Leszek Nowicki, was a Royal Institute of British Architects (RIBA) member. He was one of the Ronald Ward & Partners design team architects for London's Millbank complex. Her mother, Elizabeth Nowicka née Modelska, was a fashion designer and owned Lizzy Boutique on Old Brompton Road in the 60s and 70s.

Nowicka interned at her father's firm before attending an art foundation course and then an interior architecture degree under Fred Scott, Alan Phillips and Ben Kelly at Kingston University. The course was integral in her developing a passion for converting existing buildings to new uses.

== Career ==
Nowicka's career began working at various London architectural practices. In 1993, she co-founded her first business, Nowicka Stern and co-designed Fabric, Hanover Grand Nightclub, and Cyberia, the first internet café in London.

In 2003, she launched Nowicka & CO and introduced clients to a new interior design style focused on a site-specific narrative. Here, her designs, which retained details from the original structure, set her apart from other designers. Clients include Karsten Schubert, Gavin Turk, Peter Peri, Michael Landy and Gillian Wearing.

Alongside her client work, Nowicka also did property development. As a result, she changed her business model. She switched focus for her design consultancy to create DOMstay (originally DOMstay&live).

== Notable work ==
Among Nowicka's notable projects is the former St John's Ambulance Station in E.Sussex, which she converted into a 4-bedroom home. She preserved its architectural integrity while introducing modern elements that mix medieval and references to modern medicine. The property was featured on Channel 4's Ugly House to Lovely House with George Clarke, was a finalist for the World Architecture Awards and has received the AJ Retrofit Award in the house under £250,000 category.

Nowicka is also known for converting a 45m2 garage into a 126m2 three-bedroom home, The Gouse, a portmanteau of garage and house. The house features cedar shingles and yellow stock brick, designed to improve the street elevation and blend with the end-of-garden surroundings.

Nowicka led the restoration of a Grade II* listed Georgian property on Charles Square in Hoxton, London. The building was built in the 18th century and previously served as Shoreditch Magistrates' Court and later as headquarters for the Labour Party. Nowicka worked with English Heritage to convert the building into five residential apartments.
