= 2010 FIVB Volleyball Women's Club World Championship =

2010 Club World Championship

Tournament details
- Host country: Qatar
- Dates: December 15–21
- Teams: 6
- Venue: 1 (in 1 host city)

Final positions
- Champions: (Turkey) Fenerbahçe Acıbadem (1st title)
- Runners-up: (Brazil) Sollys Osasco
- Third place: (Italy) Norda Foppapedretti Bergamo
- Fourth place: (Dominican Republic) Mirador

Tournament awards
- MVP: (Poland) Katarzyna Skowrońska (Fenerbahçe)

The 2010 FIVB Women's Club World Championship was the fourth edition of the event. It was held at the Al Gharafa Sports Hall in Doha, Qatar from December 15 to 21, 2010. Fenerbahçe were crowned World champions by defeating Brazilian powerhouse Sollys Osasco 3–0 in the final.

== Qualification ==
Team	Qualified as
Kenya Prisons	2010 African Champions
(Thailand) Federbrau	2010 Asian Champions
(Dominican Republic) Mirador	2010 NORCECA Representatives
(Brazil) Sollys Osasco	2010 South American Champions
(Italy) Norda Foppapedretti Bergamo	2010 European Champions
(Turkey) Fenerbahçe Acıbadem	Wild Card (2010 European Runners-up)

== Pools composition ==
Pool A	Pool B
(Brazil) Sollys Osasco (Turkey) Fenerbahçe Acıbadem (Thailand) Federbrau	(Dominican Republic) Mirador; Kenya Prisons (Italy) Norda Foppapedretti Bergamo

== Venue ==
All matches
(Qatar) Doha
Al-Gharafa Indoor Hall
Capacity: 3,000

== Preliminary round ==
=== Pool A ===
Pos	Team	Pld	W	L	Pts	SW	SL	SR	SPW	SPL	SPR	Qualification
1	(Turkey) Fenerbahçe Acıbadem	2	2	0	4	6	0	MAX	150	117	1.282	Semifinals
2	(Brazil) Sollys Osasco	2	1	1	3	3	3	1.000	137	142	0.965	Semifinals
3	(Thailand) Federbrau	2	0	2	2	0	6	0.000	128	156	0.821	

Date	Time		Score		Set 1	Set 2	Set 3	Set 4	Set 5	Total	Report
15 Dec	17:00	Federbrau (Thailand)	0–3	(Brazil) Sollys Osasco	15–25	24–26	28–30			67–81	P2 P3
16 Dec	19:00	Fenerbahçe Acıbadem (Turkey)	3–0	(Brazil) Sollys Osasco	25–17	25–23	25–16			75–56	P2 P3
19 Dec	10:00	Fenerbahçe Acıbadem (Turkey)	3–0	(Thailand) Federbrau	25–20	25–18	25–23			75–61	P2 P3

=== Pool B ===
Pos	Team	Pld	W	L	Pts	SW	SL	SR	SPW	SPL	SPR	Qualification
1	(Italy) Norda Foppapedretti Bergamo	2	2	0	4	6	0	MAX	152	103	1.476	Semifinals
2	(Dominican Republic) Mirador	2	1	1	3	3	3	1.000	134	125	1.072	Semifinals
3	Kenya Prisons	2	0	2	2	0	6	0.000	92	150	0.613	

Date	Time		Score		Set 1	Set 2	Set 3	Set 4	Set 5	Total	Report
15 Dec	10:00	Kenya Prisons	0–3	(Dominican Republic) Mirador	20–25	11–25	17–25			48–75	P2 P3
16 Dec	10:00	Foppapedretti Bergamo (Italy)	3–0	(Dominican Republic) Mirador	27–25	25–12	25–22			77–59	P2 P3
17 Dec	17:00	Foppapedretti Bergamo (Italy)	3–0	Kenya Prisons	25–15	25–13	25–16			75–44	P2 P3

== Final round ==
Semifinals
December 20 – Doha
(Turkey) Fenerbahçe	3
(Dominican Republic) Mirador	0
December 20 – Doha
(Italy) Bergamo	0
(Brazil) Osasco	3

Final
December 21 – Doha
(Turkey) Fenerbahçe	3
(Brazil) Osasco	0
3rd place
December 21 – Doha
(Dominican Republic) Mirador	1
(Italy) Bergamo	3

=== Semifinals ===
Date	Time		Score		Set 1	Set 2	Set 3	Set 4	Set 5	Total	Report
20 Dec	10:00	Fenerbahçe Acıbadem (Turkey)	3–0	(Dominican Republic) Mirador	25–21	25–18	25–18			75–57	P2 P3
20 Dec	17:00	Foppapedretti Bergamo (Italy)	0–3	(Brazil) Sollys Osasco	22–25	20–25	21–25			63–75	P2 P3

=== 3rd place ===
Date	Time		Score		Set 1	Set 2	Set 3	Set 4	Set 5	Total	Report
21 Dec	10:00	Mirador (Dominican Republic)	1–3	(Italy) Foppapedretti Bergamo	8–25	25–23	8–25	15–25		56–98	P2 P3

=== Final ===
Date	Time		Score		Set 1	Set 2	Set 3	Set 4	Set 5	Total	Report
21 Dec	17:00	Fenerbahçe Acıbadem (Turkey)	3–0	(Brazil) Sollys Osasco	25–23	25–22	25–17			75–62	P2 P3

== Final standing ==
Rank	Team
1st place, gold medalist(s)	(Turkey) Fenerbahçe Acıbadem
2nd place, silver medalist(s)	(Brazil) Sollys Osasco
3rd place, bronze medalist(s)	(Italy) Norda Foppapedretti Bergamo
4	(Dominican Republic) Mirador
5	(Thailand) Federbrau
5	Kenya Prisons

2010 Women's Club World Champions

1st title

Team Roster
Skowrońska-Dolata, Güneyligil, Dikmen, Sokolova, Avcı, Fofão, Tokatlıoğlu, Fürst, Rasna, Osmokrović, Erdem, Aydemir
Head coach
Guimarães

== Awards ==
- MVP: (Poland) Katarzyna Skowrońska (Fenerbahçe)
- Best scorer: (Poland) Katarzyna Skowrońska (Fenerbahçe)
- Best spiker: (Brazil) Thaisa Menezes (Osasco)
- Best blocker: (Dominican Republic) Annerys Vargas (Mirador)
- Best server: (Turkey) Eda Erdem Dündar (Fenerbahçe)
- Best setter: (Brazil) Carolina Albuquerque (Osasco)
- Best libero: (Dominican Republic) Brenda Castillo (Mirador)
