= Jeff Novitzky =

American government agent

- Born: December 15, 1967 (age 58)
- Education: University of Arizona; Skyline College; San Jose State University
- Occupations: Current Senior Vice President of Athlete Health and Performance for the UFC
- Known for: Senior Vice President of Athlete Health and Performance for the UFC

Jeff Novitzky (born December 15, 1967) is the current Senior Vice President of Athlete Health and Performance for the UFC, the world's largest mixed martial arts (MMA) promotion. He previously served as a special agent for the Food and Drug Administration, investigating the use of steroids in professional sports. Before April 2008 he was a special agent for the Internal Revenue Service, where he investigated the use of steroids for over five years. Novitzky's work has been credited with "changing the face of sports."

== Early life and education ==
Novitzky grew up in Burlingame, California and graduated from Mills High School in Millbrae, California, in 1986. While at Mills High School, Novitzky high jumped seven feet, still the only high school athlete in San Mateo County history to achieve the seven-foot mark. Novitzky was the Peninsula Athletic League's (PAL's) Most Valuable Player in boys basketball in 1986. After graduating from Mills High School, Novitzky enrolled at the University of Arizona on a track and field scholarship, before transferring to Skyline College to continue his basketball career. Novitzky played two seasons of basketball at Skyline but just one game in his second season due to injuries. In 1989, Novitzky transferred to San Jose State University on a basketball scholarship. For the San Jose State Spartans, Novitzky played two games as a reserve forward in the 1989–90 season, Stan Morrison's first as head coach. Again, injuries limited Novitzky's playing time to those two games. Novitzky graduated from San Jose State in 1992 with a degree in accounting.

== Investigations ==
Novitzky first gained public notoriety during his role as a federal agent for the IRS. In a 2002 investigation which came to be known as the BALCO scandal, Novitzky was the lead investigative special agent for a raid on a San Francisco Bay Area laboratory co-operative that was supplying banned substances to dozens of elite professional athletes. The investigation is recognized as the world's most well known performance enhancing drug scandal in sports history. The resulting fallout implicated many well-known athletes in cheating at various high level competitions including Major League Baseball (MLB) and the Olympic Games. Notable athletes involved included Marion Jones, Tim Montgomery, Barry Bonds, Bill Romanowski, and Jason Giambi.

Novitzky was the lead special agent on the federal perjury trial of Barry Bonds. The trial detailed the extensive history of Bonds' athletic performance enhancing drug use during his quest for the two most hallowed records in American professional sports, the single season and all-time home run marks.

On May 20, 2010, the New York Daily News reported that Novitzky was involved in an investigation into performance enhancing drug use on Lance Armstrong's Tour de France teams, and that Armstrong's former teammate Floyd Landis was cooperating with the investigation. In a December 2018 UFC press conference, Novitzky referred to Armstrong as "one of the biggest frauds and cheats in professional sport history." Previously, Marion Jones, a track and field Olympian winner, pleaded guilty in October 2007 to making false statements to Novitzky.

The bulk of the names provided in the Mitchell Report about doping in Major League Baseball were provided by Radomski and Brian MacNamee, a personal trainer for MLB pitcher Roger Clemens, both of whom Novitzky persuaded to talk to Senator Mitchell and his staff.

In his book The Secret Race, former professional cyclist Tyler Hamilton wrote that Novitzky drove a "bulldozer" through the sport of cycling in uncovering details about the pervasive use of performance enhancing drugs.

Novitzky has been compared to famed U.S. Treasury Department investigator Eliot Ness.

Starting in April 2015, Novitzky began working for the UFC as their Vice President of Athlete Health and Performance. Within this role at the UFC, Novitzky oversees all anti-doping efforts, as well as other athlete related health and performance initiatives within the organization. The UFC's program is widely recognized as the most comprehensive anti-doping program in professional sports. In both 2016 and 2019, Novitzky was nominated for the category "Leading Man" at the World MMA Awards, awarded to the leading industry executive. In July 2019, Novitzky was promoted by the UFC to Senior Vice President of Athlete Health and Performance.

== Criticism ==
Novitzky has been criticized by certain defendants in steroid-related cases as being biased and unfair. Novitzky, in multiple cross examinations, including during the federal perjury investigation of Roger Clemens, has been a credible government witness.

== The Joe Rogan Experience ==
Novitzky has appeared as a guest on The Joe Rogan Experience podcast on three separate occasions. It was Brendan Schaub who coined Novitzky's nickname, "The Golden Snitch."

== Hotboxin' with Mike Tyson ==
In 2019, Novitzky appeared as a guest on Mike Tyson's podcast Hotboxin' with Mike Tyson. Tyson hailed Novitzky for his contribution to keeping the combat sports community clean. In reference to Novitzky's nickname, "The Golden Snitch", Tyson stated "No, that's not a golden snitch. He is a discoverer of people that are doing devilish and wicked things. People that are hurting people physically."
