= FIVB Women's Volleyball Club World Championship =

International women's club volleyball competition

- Most recent season or competition: 2025 FIVB Volleyball Women's Club World Championship
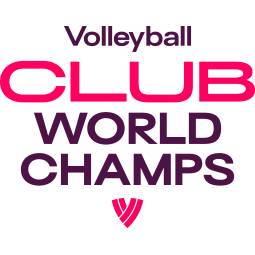
- Official logo
- Sport: Volleyball
- Founded: 1991
- First season: 1991
- No. of teams: 8
- Country: FIVB members
- Continent: International (FIVB)
- Most recent champions: (Italy) Savino Del Bene Scandicci (1 title) (2025)
- Most titles: (Turkey) Vakıfbank Spor Kulubu (4 titles)
- Streaming partner: Volleyball TV (since 2018)

The FIVB Women's Volleyball Club World Championship is an international women's club volleyball competition organised by the Fédération Internationale de Volleyball (FIVB), the sport's global governing body. The competition was first contested in 1991 in Brazil. It was not held between 1995 and 2009, but since 2010, the competition has been held every year, and has been hosted by Qatar, Switzerland, the Philippines, Japan, China and Turkey. The competition was held in Zhejiang Province of China in 2018 and 2019. After the 2020 championship was cancelled due to corona virus pandemic, the competition was held in Turkey in 2021.

The current champions are Italy's Savino Del Bene Scandicci, who defeated Italy's Imoco Volley Conegliano 3–1 in the final of the 2025 edition, to win their first title in the competition.

== Results summary ==
| Year | Host | Final | | | 3rd place match | | | Teams |
| Year | Host | Champions | Score | Runners-up | 3rd place | Score | 4th place | Teams |
| 1991; Details | (Brazil); São Paulo | (Brazil); Sadia São Paulo | 3–0 | (Brazil); São Caetano (Note: At the time the club was competing under the name Colgate/Pão de Açúcar.) | (Croatia); Mladost Zagreb | 3–1 | (Italy); Modena | 8 |
| 1992; Details | (Italy); Jesi | (Italy); Teodora Ravenna | 3–0 | (Brazil); Minas Tênis Clube | (Russia); Uralochka Yekaterinburg | 3–2 | (Italy); Brogliaccio Ancona | 8 |
| 1994; Details | (Brazil); São Paulo | (Brazil); Leite Moça Sorocaba | 3–0 | (Italy); Matera | (Brazil); Osasco (Note: At the time the club was competing under the name BCN/Guarujá.) | 3–2 | (Russia); Uralochka Yekaterinburg | 6 |
| 2010; Details | (Qatar); Doha | (Turkey); Fenerbahçe Acıbadem | 3–0 | (Brazil); Osasco | (Italy); Bergamo | 3–1 | (Dominican Republic); Mirador | 6 |
| 2011; Details | (Qatar); Doha | (Azerbaijan); Rabita Baku | 3–0 | (Turkey); VakıfBank Türk Telekom | (Brazil); Osasco | 3–0 | (Dominican Republic); Mirador | 6 |
| 2012; Details | (Qatar); Doha | (Brazil); Osasco | 3–0 | (Azerbaijan); Rabita Baku | (Turkey); Fenerbahçe | 3–0 | (Puerto Rico); Lancheras de Cataño | 6 |
| 2013; Details | (Switzerland); Zurich | (Turkey); Vakıfbank İstanbul | 3–0 | (Brazil); Rio de Janeiro | (China); Guangdong Evergrande | 3–1 | (Switzerland); Voléro Zürich | 6 |
| 2014; Details | (Switzerland); Zurich | (Russia); Dinamo Kazan | 3–0 | (Brazil); Osasco | (Brazil); SESI São Paulo | 3–2 | (Switzerland); Voléro Zürich | 6 |
| 2015; Details | (Switzerland); Zurich | (Turkey); Eczacıbaşı VitrA | 3–1 | (Russia); Dinamo Krasnodar | (Switzerland); Voléro Zürich | 3–0 | (Brazil); Rio de Janeiro | 6 |
| 2016; Details | (Philippines); Pasay | (Turkey); Eczacıbaşı VitrA | 3–2 | (Italy); Pomì Casalmaggiore | (Turkey); Vakıfbank İstanbul | 3–1 | (Switzerland); Voléro Zürich | 8 |
| 2017; Details | (Japan); Kobe | (Turkey); Vakıfbank İstanbul | 3–0 | (Brazil); Rio de Janeiro | (Switzerland); Voléro Zürich | 3–2 | (Turkey); Eczacıbaşı VitrA | 8 |
| 2018; Details | (China); Shaoxing | (Turkey); Vakıfbank İstanbul | 3–0 | (Brazil); Minas Tênis Clube | (Turkey); Eczacıbaşı VitrA | 3–0 | (Brazil); Praia | 8 |
| 2019; Details | (China); Shaoxing | (Italy); Imoco Volley Conegliano | 3–1 | (Turkey); Eczacıbaşı VitrA | (Turkey); Vakıfbank İstanbul | 3–0 | (Italy); Igor Gorgonzola Novara | 8 |
| 2020 | Canceled due to COVID-19 pandemic | | | | | | | |
| 2021; Details | (Turkey); Ankara | (Turkey); Vakıfbank İstanbul | 3–2 | (Italy); A. Carraro Imoco Conegliano | (Turkey); Fenerbahçe Opet | 3–0 | (Brazil); Minas Tênis Clube | 6 |
| 2022; Details | (Turkey); Antalya | (Italy); Prosecco Doc Imoco Volley Conegliano | 3–1 | (Turkey); Vakıfbank İstanbul | (Turkey); Eczacıbaşı Dynavit | 3–1 | (Brazil); Gerdau Minas | 6 |
| 2023; Details | (China); Hangzhou | (Turkey); Eczacıbaşı Dynavit | 3–2 | (Turkey); VakıfBank İstanbul | (China); Tianjin Bohai Bank | 3–1 | (Brazil); Dentil Praia Clube | 6 |
| 2024; Details | (China); Hangzhou | (Italy); Prosecco Doc Imoco Volley Conegliano | 3–0 | (China); Tianjin Bohai Bank | (Italy); Numia Vero Volley Milano | 3–0 | (Brazil); Dentil Praia Clube | 8 |
| 2025; Details | (Brazil); São Paulo | (Italy); Savino Del Bene Scandicci | 3–1 | (Italy); Prosecco Doc Imoco Volley Conegliano | (Brazil); Osasco São Cristóvão Saúde | 3–0 | (Brazil); Dentil Praia Clube | 8 |

=== Results by confederation ===
| Confederation | Winner | Second | Third | Fourth |
|---|---|---|---|---|
| CEV | 15 | 10 | 12 | 8 |
| CSV | 3 | 7 | 4 | 7 |
| AVC | — | 1 | 2 | — |
| NORCECA | — | — | — | 3 |
| CAVB | — | — | — | — |

- As of 14 December 2025

== Format ==
The competition formula of the FIVB Women's Volleyball Club World Championship has been constantly changed to fit the different number of teams that participate in each edition.

In general, the format of the tournament involves eight teams competing for the title at venues within the host nation over a period of about one week; the winners of that year's AVC Champions League (Asia), African Clubs Championship (Africa), South American Volleyball Club Championship (South America) and CEV Champions League (Europe), along with the host city's team and a nominated team from North America. The number of teams is increased through wild card invitees.

Starting from 2024, the qualification for the Club World Championships will be as follows: two places per continent for Europe, Asia, and South America; one place for Africa; and finally, a club from the host nation will be granted a place. This change aims to ensure the fair representation from different continents and provides an opportunity for the host country to participate in the tournament.

| Slots | Qualified as |
|---|---|
| 1 | Host club |
| 2 | CEV Champions League – Winner |
| 2 | CEV Champions League – Runner-up |
| 2 | CSV Club Championship – Winner |
| 2 | CSV Club Championship – Runner-up |
| 2 | AVC Champions League – Winner |
| 2 | AVC Champions League – Runner-up |
| 1 | CAVB Club Championship – Winner |
Total: 8

== Prize money ==
The total prize money for the tournament is over US$350,000.

== Medals summary ==
=== Medal table by club ===
| Rank | club | Gold | Silver | Bronze | Total |
|---|---|---|---|---|---|
| 1 | (Turkey) Vakıfbank İstanbul | 4 | 3 | 2 | 9 |
| 2 | (Italy) Imoco Volley Conegliano | 3 | 2 | 0 | 5 |
| 3 | (Turkey) Eczacıbaşı VitrA | 3 | 1 | 2 | 6 |
| 4 | (Brazil) Osasco | 1 | 2 | 3 | 6 |
| 5 | (Azerbaijan) Rabita Baku | 1 | 1 | 0 | 2 |
| 6 | (Turkey) Fenerbahçe | 1 | 0 | 2 | 3 |
| 7 | (Russia) Dinamo Kazan | 1 | 0 | 0 | 1 |
| 7 | (Brazil) Leite Moça Sorocaba | 1 | 0 | 0 | 1 |
| 7 | (Brazil) Sadia São Paulo | 1 | 0 | 0 | 1 |
| 7 | (Italy) Savino Del Bene Scandicci | 1 | 0 | 0 | 1 |
| 7 | (Italy) Teodora Ravenna | 1 | 0 | 0 | 1 |
| 12 | (Brazil) Minas Tênis Clube | 0 | 2 | 0 | 2 |
| 12 | (Brazil) Rio de Janeiro | 0 | 2 | 0 | 2 |
| 14 | (China) Tianjin Bohai Bank | 0 | 1 | 1 | 2 |
| 15 | (Italy) Casalmaggiore | 0 | 1 | 0 | 1 |
| 15 | (Russia) Dinamo Krasnodar | 0 | 1 | 0 | 1 |
| 15 | (Italy) Matera | 0 | 1 | 0 | 1 |
| 15 | (Brazil) São Caetano | 0 | 1 | 0 | 1 |
| 19 | (Switzerland) Voléro Zürich | 0 | 0 | 2 | 2 |
| 20 | (Italy) Bergamo | 0 | 0 | 1 | 1 |
| 20 | (China) Guangdong Evergrande | 0 | 0 | 1 | 1 |
| 20 | (Socialist Federal Republic of Yugoslavia) Mladost Zagreb (Note: FIVB considers Serbia (Since 2007) as the inheritor of the records of Yugoslavia (1948-1991), Federal Republic of Yugoslavia (1992-2002) and Serbia and Montenegro (2003-2006).) | 0 | 0 | 1 | 1 |
| 20 | (Italy) Numia Vero Volley Milano | 0 | 0 | 1 | 1 |
| 20 | (Brazil) SESI São Paulo | 0 | 0 | 1 | 1 |
| 20 | (Russia) Uralochka Yekaterinburg | 0 | 0 | 1 | 1 |
| Totals (25 entries) | | 18 | 18 | 18 | 54 |

=== Medal table by country ===
| Rank | Nation | Gold | Silver | Bronze | Total |
|---|---|---|---|---|---|
| 1 | Turkey | 8 | 4 | 6 | 18 |
| 2 | Italy | 5 | 4 | 2 | 11 |
| 3 | Brazil | 3 | 7 | 4 | 14 |
| 4 | Russia | 1 | 1 | 1 | 3 |
| 5 | Azerbaijan | 1 | 1 | 0 | 2 |
| 6 | China | 0 | 1 | 2 | 3 |
| 7 | Switzerland | 0 | 0 | 2 | 2 |
| 8 | Croatia | 0 | 0 | 1 | 1 |
| Totals (8 entries) | | 18 | 18 | 18 | 54 |

- As of 14 December 2025

== Most valuable player by edition ==
- 1991 – (Brazil) Ida Alvares (Sadia São Paulo)
- 1992 – (Brazil) Ana Flávia Sanglard (Minas)
- 1994 – (Brazil) Ana Moser (Leite Moça Sorocaba)
- 2010 – (Poland) Katarzyna Skowrońska-Dolata (Fenerbahçe)
- 2011 – (Croatia) Nataša Osmokrović (Rabita Baku)
- 2012 – (Brazil) Sheilla Castro (Osasco)
- 2013 – (Serbia) Jovana Brakočević (Vakıfbank)
- 2014 – (Russia) Yekaterina Gamova (Dynamo Kazan)
- 2015 – (United States) Jordan Larson (Eczacıbaşı)
- 2016 – (Serbia) Tijana Bošković (Eczacıbaşı)
- 2017 – (China) Zhu Ting (Vakıfbank)
- 2018 – (China) Zhu Ting (2) (Vakıfbank)
- 2019 – (Italy) Paola Egonu (Imoco Conegliano)
- 2021 – (Sweden) Isabelle Haak (Vakıfbank)
- 2022 – (Sweden) Isabelle Haak (2) (Imoco Conegliano)
- 2023 – (Serbia) Tijana Bošković (2) (Eczacıbaşı)
- 2024 – (Sweden) Isabelle Haak (3) (Imoco Conegliano)
- 2025 – (Italy) Ekaterina Antropova (Scandicci)

== See also ==
Men's

- African Clubs Championship
- Asian Men's Club Volleyball Championship
- CEV Champions League
- CEV Challenge Cup
- CEV Cup
- FIVB Volleyball Men's Club World Championship
- Men's South American Volleyball Club Championship

Women's

- Asian Women's Club Volleyball Championship
- CEV Women's Champions League
- CEV Women's Challenge Cup
- CEV Cup Women's
- Women's African Clubs Championship
- Women's South American Volleyball Club Championship
