= 2013 FIVB Women's World Grand Champions Cup squads =

This article shows all participating team squads at the 2013 FIVB Women's World Grand Champions Cup, held from November 12 to November 17, 2013 in Japan.

== Brazil ==
The following is the Brazil roster in the 2013 FIVB Women's World Grand Champions Cup.

#	Name	Date of birth	Height	Weight	Spike	Block	Club
1	Fabiana Claudino	24 January 1985	193 cm (6 ft 4 in)	76 kg (168 lb)	314 cm (10 ft 4 in)	293 cm (9 ft 7 in)	SESI - SP
2	Caroline Gattaz	27 July 1981	191 cm (6 ft 3 in)	87 kg (192 lb)	304 cm (10 ft 0 in)	280 cm (9 ft 2 in)	UNILEVER
5	Adenizia Da Silva	18 December 1986	185 cm (6 ft 1 in)	63 kg (139 lb)	312 cm (10 ft 3 in)	290 cm (9 ft 6 in)	Molico/Nestlé
8	Claudia Silva	21 September 1987	181 cm (5 ft 11 in)	80 kg (180 lb)	290 cm (9 ft 6 in)	266 cm (8 ft 9 in)	Minas Tenis Clube
9	Michelle Pavão	31 October 1986	178 cm (5 ft 10 in)	62 kg (137 lb)	295 cm (9 ft 8 in)	283 cm (9 ft 3 in)	BRASÍLIA VÔLEI
10	Walewska Oliveira	1 October 1979	190 cm (6 ft 3 in)	73 kg (161 lb)	310 cm (10 ft 2 in)	290 cm (9 ft 6 in)	C. A. V. Murcia
11	Tandara Caixeta	30 October 1988	184 cm (6 ft 0 in)	87 kg (192 lb)	305 cm (10 ft 0 in)	297 cm (9 ft 9 in)	BANANA BOAT/PRAIA CLUBE
12	Natália Pereira	4 April 1989	183 cm (6 ft 0 in)	76 kg (168 lb)	300 cm (9 ft 10 in)	288 cm (9 ft 5 in)	Rexona-Ades
13	Sheilla Castro	1 July 1983	185 cm (6 ft 1 in)	64 kg (141 lb)	302 cm (9 ft 11 in)	284 cm (9 ft 4 in)	Vakifbank
14	Fabiana Oliveira	7 March 1980	169 cm (5 ft 7 in)	59 kg (130 lb)	276 cm (9 ft 1 in)	266 cm (8 ft 9 in)	Unilever Volei
15	Monique Pavão	31 October 1986	178 cm (5 ft 10 in)	67 kg (148 lb)	294 cm (9 ft 8 in)	285 cm (9 ft 4 in)	SESI
16	Fernanda Rodrigues	10 May 1986	179 cm (5 ft 10 in)	74 kg (163 lb)	308 cm (10 ft 1 in)	288 cm (9 ft 5 in)	Dinamo Krasnodar
17	Josefa Fabiola De Sousa	3 February 1983	184 cm (6 ft 0 in)	70 kg (150 lb)	300 cm (9 ft 10 in)	285 cm (9 ft 4 in)	Dinamo Krasnodar
18	Camila Brait	28 October 1988	170 cm (5 ft 7 in)	58 kg (128 lb)	271 cm (8 ft 11 in)	256 cm (8 ft 5 in)	Molico/Nestlé

== Dominican Republic ==
The following is the Dominican Republic roster in the 2013 FIVB Women's World Grand Champions Cup.

#	Name	Date of birth	Height	Weight	Spike	Block	Club
1	Annerys Victoria Vargas Valdez	7 August 1981	196 cm (6 ft 5 in)	70 kg (150 lb)	327 cm (10 ft 9 in)	320 cm (10 ft 6 in)	Seleccion Nacional
2	Winifer Maria Fernandez Perez	6 January 1995	169 cm (5 ft 7 in)	62 kg (137 lb)	270 cm (8 ft 10 in)	265 cm (8 ft 8 in)	Cien Fuego
4	Marianne Fersola Norberto	16 January 1992	191 cm (6 ft 3 in)	60 kg (130 lb)	315 cm (10 ft 4 in)	310 cm (10 ft 2 in)	Mirador
5	Brenda Castillo	5 June 1992	167 cm (5 ft 6 in)	55 kg (121 lb)	245 cm (8 ft 0 in)	230 cm (7 ft 7 in)	San Cristobal
7	Niverka Dharlenis Marte Frica	19 October 1990	178 cm (5 ft 10 in)	71 kg (157 lb)	295 cm (9 ft 8 in)	283 cm (9 ft 3 in)	Deportivo Nacional
8	Candida Estefany Arias Perez	11 March 1992	194 cm (6 ft 4 in)	68 kg (150 lb)	320 cm (10 ft 6 in)	315 cm (10 ft 4 in)	San Cristobal
11	Jeoselyna Rodriguez Santos	9 December 1991	187 cm (6 ft 2 in)	63 kg (139 lb)	325 cm (10 ft 8 in)	315 cm (10 ft 4 in)	Mirador
12	Karla Miguelina Echenique Medina	16 May 1986	180 cm (5 ft 11 in)	65 kg (143 lb)	300 cm (9 ft 10 in)	290 cm (9 ft 6 in)	Deportivo Nacional
14	Prisilla Rivera Brens	29 December 1984	183 cm (6 ft 0 in)	67 kg (148 lb)	309 cm (10 ft 2 in)	305 cm (10 ft 0 in)	San Pedro
16	Yonkaira Paola Peña Isabel	10 May 1993	190 cm (6 ft 3 in)	70 kg (150 lb)	320 cm (10 ft 6 in)	310 cm (10 ft 2 in)	Mirador
17	Gina Altagracia Mambru Casilla	21 January 1986	182 cm (6 ft 0 in)	65 kg (143 lb)	330 cm (10 ft 10 in)	315 cm (10 ft 4 in)	Los Cachorros
18	Bethania De La Cruz De Peña	13 May 1987	188 cm (6 ft 2 in)	70 kg (150 lb)	330 cm (10 ft 10 in)	320 cm (10 ft 6 in)	Deportivo Nacional
19	Ana Yorkira Binet Stephens	9 February 1992	174 cm (5 ft 9 in)	58 kg (128 lb)	280 cm (9 ft 2 in)	260 cm (8 ft 6 in)	Samana
20	Brayelin Elizabeth Martinez	11 September 1996	201 cm (6 ft 7 in)	83 kg (183 lb)	330 cm (10 ft 10 in)	320 cm (10 ft 6 in)	Deportivo Nacional

== Japan ==
The following is the Japan roster in the 2013 FIVB Women's World Grand Champions Cup.

#	Name	Date of birth	Height	Weight	Spike	Block	Club
1	Miyu Nagaoka	25 July 1991	179 cm (5 ft 10 in)	68 kg (150 lb)	310 cm (10 ft 2 in)	298 cm (9 ft 9 in)	Hisamitsu Springs
2	Hitomi Nakamichi	18 September 1985	159 cm (5 ft 3 in)	53 kg (117 lb)	270 cm (8 ft 10 in)	256 cm (8 ft 5 in)	Toray Arrows
3	Saori Kimura	19 August 1986	185 cm (6 ft 1 in)	65 kg (143 lb)	304 cm (10 ft 0 in)	293 cm (9 ft 7 in)	Toray Arrows
4	Kanako Hirai	15 April 1984	183 cm (6 ft 0 in)	69 kg (152 lb)	309 cm (10 ft 2 in)	290 cm (9 ft 6 in)	Hisamitsu Springs
5	Yukino Nagamatsu	7 February 1989	167 cm (5 ft 6 in)	57 kg (126 lb)	280 cm (9 ft 2 in)	270 cm (8 ft 10 in)	Hitachi Rivale
7	Arisa Satō	18 July 1989	164 cm (5 ft 5 in)	53 kg (117 lb)	275 cm (9 ft 0 in)	268 cm (8 ft 10 in)	Hitachi Rivale
8	Kotoki Zayasu	11 January 1990	159 cm (5 ft 3 in)	57 kg (126 lb)	270 cm (8 ft 10 in)	255 cm (8 ft 4 in)	Hisamitsu Springs
10	Nana Iwasaka	3 July 1990	187 cm (6 ft 2 in)	72 kg (159 lb)	300 cm (9 ft 10 in)	285 cm (9 ft 4 in)	Hisamitsu Seiyaku Springs
12	Yuki Ishii	8 May 1991	180 cm (5 ft 11 in)	68 kg (150 lb)	302 cm (9 ft 11 in)	286 cm (9 ft 5 in)	Hisamitsu Springs
13	Risa Shinnabe	11 July 1990	173 cm (5 ft 8 in)	66 kg (146 lb)	295 cm (9 ft 8 in)	268 cm (8 ft 10 in)	Hisamitsu Seiyaku Springs
14	Yukiko Ebata	7 November 1989	176 cm (5 ft 9 in)	67 kg (148 lb)	305 cm (10 ft 0 in)	298 cm (9 ft 9 in)	Racing Club Cannes
16	Saori Sakoda	18 December 1987	175 cm (5 ft 9 in)	63 kg (139 lb)	305 cm (10 ft 0 in)	279 cm (9 ft 2 in)	Toray Arrows
17	Akari Oumi	10 November 1989	171 cm (5 ft 7 in)	64 kg (141 lb)	297 cm (9 ft 9 in)	276 cm (9 ft 1 in)	NEC Red Rockets
19	Riho Otake	23 December 1993	182 cm (6 ft 0 in)	68 kg (150 lb)	306 cm (10 ft 0 in)	296 cm (9 ft 9 in)	Denso Airybees

== Russia ==
The following is the Russia roster in the 2013 FIVB Women's World Grand Champions Cup.

#	Name	Date of birth	Height	Weight	Spike	Block	Club
3	Daria Isaeva	29 March 1990	186 cm (6 ft 1 in)	75 kg (165 lb)	310 cm (10 ft 2 in)	304 cm (10 ft 0 in)	Omichka-Omsk
5	Liubov Shashkova	4 December 1977	192 cm (6 ft 4 in)	72 kg (159 lb)	315 cm (10 ft 4 in)	307 cm (10 ft 1 in)	Dinamo Krasnodar
7	Svetlana Kryuchkova	21 February 1985	174 cm (5 ft 9 in)	63 kg (139 lb)	290 cm (9 ft 6 in)	286 cm (9 ft 5 in)	Dinamo Krasnodar
10	Ekaterina Kosianenko	2 February 1990	178 cm (5 ft 10 in)	64 kg (141 lb)	290 cm (9 ft 6 in)	285 cm (9 ft 4 in)	Zarechie-Odinzovo
11	Victoriia Chaplina	23 October 1988	188 cm (6 ft 2 in)	77 kg (170 lb)	301 cm (9 ft 11 in)	295 cm (9 ft 8 in)	Uralochka-NTMK
12	Alexandra Pasynkova	14 April 1987	190 cm (6 ft 3 in)	75 kg (165 lb)	313 cm (10 ft 3 in)	305 cm (10 ft 0 in)	Dinamo Krasnodar
13	Evgeniya Startseva	12 February 1989	185 cm (6 ft 1 in)	68 kg (150 lb)	294 cm (9 ft 8 in)	290 cm (9 ft 6 in)	Dinamo-Kazan
14	Natalia Dianskaya	7 March 1989	186 cm (6 ft 1 in)	64 kg (141 lb)	310 cm (10 ft 2 in)	295 cm (9 ft 8 in)	Dinamo Krasnodar
15	Tatiana Kosheleva	23 December 1988	191 cm (6 ft 3 in)	67 kg (148 lb)	315 cm (10 ft 4 in)	305 cm (10 ft 0 in)	Dinamo Krasnodar
17	Natalia Malykh	8 December 1993	187 cm (6 ft 2 in)	65 kg (143 lb)	308 cm (10 ft 1 in)	297 cm (9 ft 9 in)	Zarechie-Odinzovo
19	Anna Malova	16 April 1990	175 cm (5 ft 9 in)	59 kg (130 lb)	286 cm (9 ft 5 in)	290 cm (9 ft 6 in)	Dinamo Moscow
20	Anastasia Shlyakhovaya	5 October 1990	192 cm (6 ft 4 in)	69 kg (152 lb)	313 cm (10 ft 3 in)	307 cm (10 ft 1 in)	Omichka Omsk

== Thailand ==
The following is the Thailand roster in the 2013 FIVB Women's World Grand Champions Cup.

#	Name	Date of birth	Height	Weight	Spike	Block	Club
1	Wanna Buakaew	2 January 1981	172 cm (5 ft 8 in)	54 kg (119 lb)	292 cm (9 ft 7 in)	277 cm (9 ft 1 in)	Idea khonkaen VC
2	Piyanut Pannoy	10 November 1989	171 cm (5 ft 7 in)	68 kg (150 lb)	280 cm (9 ft 2 in)	275 cm (9 ft 0 in)	Supreme VC
4	Thatdao Nuekjang	3 February 1994	183 cm (6 ft 0 in)	66 kg (146 lb)	305 cm (10 ft 0 in)	287 cm (9 ft 5 in)	Idea-Khonkaen VC
5	Pleumjit Thinkaow	9 November 1983	180 cm (5 ft 11 in)	63 kg (139 lb)	298 cm (9 ft 9 in)	281 cm (9 ft 3 in)	Bangkok Glass VC
6	Onuma Sittirak	13 June 1986	175 cm (5 ft 9 in)	72 kg (159 lb)	304 cm (10 ft 0 in)	285 cm (9 ft 4 in)	JT Marvelous
10	Wilavan Apinyapong	6 June 1984	174 cm (5 ft 9 in)	68 kg (150 lb)	294 cm (9 ft 8 in)	282 cm (9 ft 3 in)	Nakornratchasima VC
11	Amporn Hyapha	19 May 1985	180 cm (5 ft 11 in)	70 kg (150 lb)	301 cm (9 ft 11 in)	290 cm (9 ft 6 in)	Nakhonnon VC
12	Tapaphaipun Chaisri	29 November 1989	168 cm (5 ft 6 in)	60 kg (130 lb)	295 cm (9 ft 8 in)	276 cm (9 ft 1 in)	Sisaket VC
13	Nootsara Tomkom	7 July 1985	169 cm (5 ft 7 in)	57 kg (126 lb)	289 cm (9 ft 6 in)	278 cm (9 ft 1 in)	Rabita Baku
15	Malika Kanthong	8 January 1987	177 cm (5 ft 10 in)	63 kg (139 lb)	292 cm (9 ft 7 in)	278 cm (9 ft 1 in)	Nakhonnon-3BB VC
16	Pornpun Guedpard	5 May 1993	170 cm (5 ft 7 in)	63 kg (139 lb)	270 cm (8 ft 10 in)	267 cm (8 ft 9 in)	Bangkok Glass VC
18	Ajcharaporn Kongyot	18 June 1995	180 cm (5 ft 11 in)	66 kg (146 lb)	290 cm (9 ft 6 in)	284 cm (9 ft 4 in)	Supreme VC

== United States ==
The following is the United States roster in the 2013 FIVB Women's World Grand Champions Cup.

#	Name	Date of birth	Height	Weight	Spike	Block	Club
1	Alisha Glass	5 April 1988	184 cm (6 ft 0 in)	72 kg (159 lb)	305 cm (10 ft 0 in)	300 cm (9 ft 10 in)	Imoco Volley
4	Cursty Jackson	11 September 1990	188 cm (6 ft 2 in)	71 kg (157 lb)	320 cm (10 ft 6 in)	310 cm (10 ft 2 in)	Galatasaray
5	Tamari Miyashiro	8 July 1987	170 cm (5 ft 7 in)	70 kg (150 lb)	284 cm (9 ft 4 in)	266 cm (8 ft 9 in)	Allianz Volley Stuttgart
7	Cassidy Lichtman	25 May 1989	185 cm (6 ft 1 in)	68 kg (150 lb)	299 cm (9 ft 10 in)	279 cm (9 ft 2 in)	Sichuan Women's Volleyball
8	Lauren Gibbemeyer	8 September 1988	187 cm (6 ft 2 in)	71 kg (157 lb)	307 cm (10 ft 1 in)	293 cm (9 ft 7 in)	VBC Pallavolo Rosa
9	Kristin Lynn Hildebrand	30 June 1985	185 cm (6 ft 1 in)	68 kg (150 lb)	300 cm (9 ft 10 in)	284 cm (9 ft 4 in)	Impel Volleyball S.A.
10	Jordan Larson-Burbach	16 October 1986	188 cm (6 ft 2 in)	75 kg (165 lb)	302 cm (9 ft 11 in)	295 cm (9 ft 8 in)	Eczacibasi Vitra Istanbul
12	Kayla Banwarth	21 January 1989	178 cm (5 ft 10 in)	75 kg (165 lb)	295 cm (9 ft 8 in)	283 cm (9 ft 3 in)	USA Volleyball Team
13	Christa Harmotto Dietzen	12 October 1986	188 cm (6 ft 2 in)	79 kg (174 lb)	322 cm (10 ft 7 in)	300 cm (9 ft 10 in)	Fenerbahce SK
14	Nicole Fawcett	16 December 1986	191 cm (6 ft 3 in)	82 kg (181 lb)	310 cm (10 ft 2 in)	291 cm (9 ft 7 in)	Fujian Yango Women's VB Club
15	Kelly Murphy	20 October 1989	188 cm (6 ft 2 in)	79 kg (174 lb)	315 cm (10 ft 4 in)	307 cm (10 ft 1 in)	Ageo Medics
16	Kimberly Hill	30 November 1989	193 cm (6 ft 4 in)	72 kg (159 lb)	320 cm (10 ft 6 in)	310 cm (10 ft 2 in)	Vakifbank Istanbul
17	Lauren Paolini	22 August 1987	193 cm (6 ft 4 in)	73 kg (161 lb)	317 cm (10 ft 5 in)	299 cm (9 ft 10 in)	Hitachi Automotive Systems
20	Jenna Hagglund	28 May 1989	178 cm (5 ft 10 in)	68 kg (150 lb)	292 cm (9 ft 7 in)	290 cm (9 ft 6 in)	Futura Volley
