= Cláudia da Silva =

Brazilian volleyball player (born 1987)

Claudia Silva
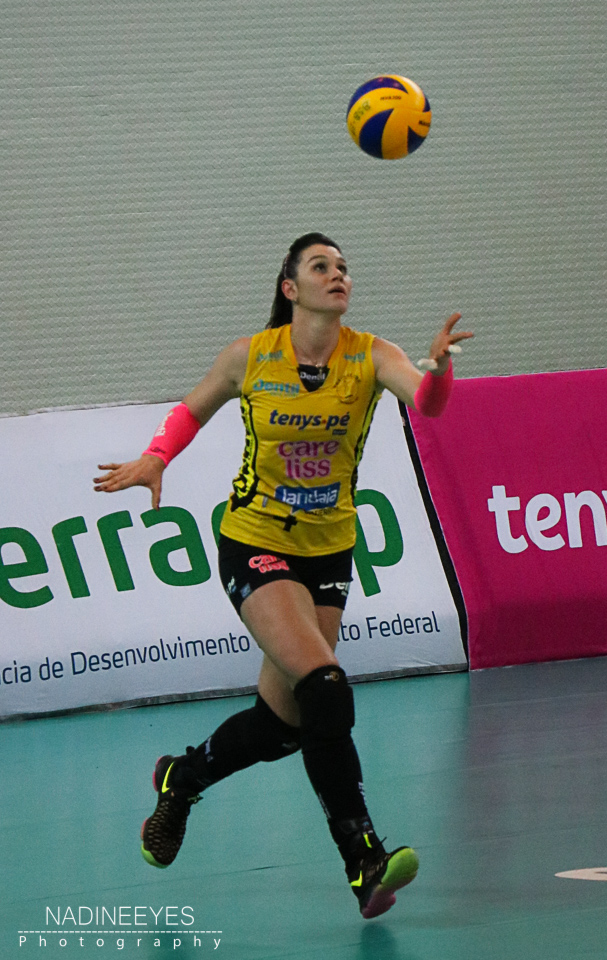

Personal information
- Full name: Cláudia Bueno da Silva
- Nationality: Brazilian
- Born: 21 September 1987 (age 39); São Caetano do Sul, São Paulo
- Height: 1.81 m (71 in)
- Weight: 80 kg (176 lb)
- Spike: 290 cm (114 in)
- Block: 266 cm (105 in)

Volleyball information
- Position: Setter
- Current club: Praia Clube
- Number: 4

National team
2013	Brazil
Honours
Women's volleyball
Representing Brazil
World Grand Champions Cup
Gold medal – first place	2013 Japan	Team
World Grand Prix
Gold medal – first place	2013 Sapporo	Team
Montreux Volley Masters
Gold medal – first place	2013 Switzerland

Cláudia Bueno da Silva (born 21 September 1987) is a Brazilian female volleyball player. She was part of the Brazil women's national volleyball team. On club level she played for Minas Tenis Clube in 2013.

== Clubs ==
- (Brazil) São Caetano (2004–2008)
- (Brazil) Praia Clube (2008–2010)
- (Brazil) Minas Tênis Clube (2010–2013)
- (Brazil) Vôlei Amil/Campinas (2013–2014)
- (Brazil) SESI São Paulo (2014–2015)
- (Brazil) Praia Clube (2015–2018)
- (Brazil) Osasco/Audax (2018–2019)
- (Brazil) Praia Clube (2019–)

== Awards ==
=== Clubs ===
- 2015–16 Brazilian Superliga – Runner-up, with Dentil/Praia Clube
- 2017–18 Brazilian Superliga – Champion, with Dentil/Praia Clube
- 2020–21 Brazilian Superliga – Runner-up, with Dentil/Praia Clube
- 2021–22 Brazilian Superliga – Runner-up, with Dentil/Praia Clube
- 2022–23 Brazilian Superliga – Champion, with Dentil/Praia Clube
- 2017 South American Club Championship – Runner-up, with Dentil/Praia Clube
- 2020 South American Club Championship – Runner-Up, with Dentil/Praia Clube
- 2021 South American Club Championship – Champion, with Dentil/Praia Clube
- 2022 South American Club Championship – Runner-Up, with Dentil/Praia Clube
