= Walewska Oliveira =

Brazilian volleyball player (1979–2023)

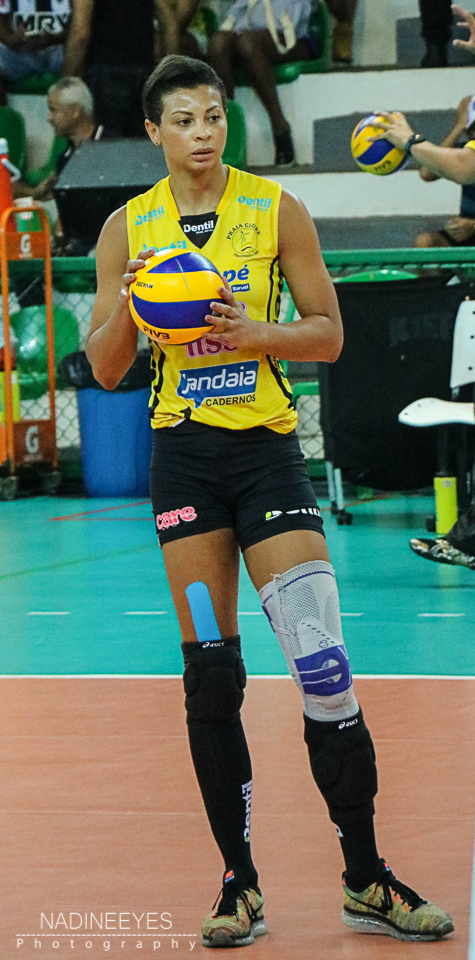
- Walewska in 2017

Personal information
- Full name: Walewska Moreira de Oliveira
- Born: 1 October 1979; Belo Horizonte, Minas Gerais, Brazil
- Died: 21 September 2023 (aged 43); São Paulo, São Paulo, Brazil
- Height: 1.90 m (6 ft 3 in)
- Weight: 73 kg (161 lb)
- Spike: 310 cm (120 in)
- Block: 290 cm (110 in)

Volleyball information
- Position: Middle blocker

National team
1998–2008, 2013	Brazil
Honours
Women's volleyball
Representing Brazil
Olympic Games
Gold medal – first place	2008 Beijing	Team
Bronze medal – third place	2000 Sydney	Team
World Championship
Silver medal – second place	2006 Japan	Team
World Cup
Silver medal – second place	2003 Japan	Team
Silver medal – second place	2007 Japan	Team
Bronze medal – third place	1999 Japan
World Grand Prix
Gold medal – first place	2004 Reggio Calabria	Team
Gold medal – first place	2006 Reggio Calabria	Team
Gold medal – first place	2008 Yokohama	Team
Silver medal – second place	1999 Yu Xi
Bronze medal – third place	2000 Manila
World Grand Champions Cup
Gold medal – first place	2013 Japan	Team
Pan American Games
Gold medal – first place	1999 Winnipeg
Silver medal – second place	2007 Rio de Janeiro	Team
Final Four Cup
Gold medal – first place	2008 Fortaleza

Walewska Moreira de Oliveira (1 October 1979 – 21 September 2023) was a Brazilian volleyball player in three consecutive Summer Olympics, starting in 2000. She won a bronze medal with the women's national team in Sydney, Australia, and a gold medal in the 2008 Olympics in Beijing. Walewska also claimed the gold medal at the 1999 Pan American Games.

Walewska Oliveira died in São Paulo on 21 September 2023, at the age of 43.

== Clubs ==
- (Brazil) MRV-Sugar/Minas (1997–1998)
- (Brazil) Rexona (1998–2003)
- (Brazil) Açucar União/São Caetano (2003–2004)
- (Italy) Sirio Perugia (2004–2007)
- (Spain) Grupo 2002 Murcia (2007–2008)
- (Russia) VC Zarechie Odintsovo (2008–2011)
- (Brazil) Vôlei Futuro (2011–2012)
- (Brazil) Vôlei Amil (2012–2014)
- (Brazil) Minas Tênis Clube (2014–2015)
- (Brazil) Praia Clube (2015–2018)
- (Brazil) Osasco Audax (2018–2019)
- (Brazil) Praia Clube (2019–2022)

== Awards ==
=== Individuals ===
- 2007 South American Championship – "Best Server"
- 2008 FIVB World Grand Prix – "Best Blocker"
- 2015–16 Brazilian Superliga – "Best Spiker"
- 2017 South American Club Championship – "Best Middle Blocker"

=== Clubs ===
- 1999–00 Brazilian Superliga – Champion, with Rexona
- 2004–05 Italian League – Runner-up, with Pallavolo Sirio Perugia
- 2005–06 CEV Champions League – Champion, with Pallavolo Sirio Perugia
- 2006–07 Italian League – Champion, with Pallavolo Sirio Perugia
- 2008–09 Russian Super League – Runner-up, with Zarechye Odintsovo
- 2009–10 Russian Super League – Champion, with Zarechye Odintsovo
- 2015–16 Brazilian Superliga – Runner-up, with Dentil Praia Clube
- 2017–18 Brazilian Superliga – Champion, with Dentil Praia Clube
- 2020–21 Brazilian Superliga – Runner-up, with Dentil Praia Clube
- 2021–22 Brazilian Superliga – Runner-up, with Dentil Praia Clube
- 2017 South American Club Championship – Runner-up, with Dentil Praia Clube
- 2020 South American Club Championship – Runner-up, with Dentil Praia Clube
- 2021 South American Club Championship – Champion, with Dentil Praia Clube
- 2022 South American Club Championship – Runner-up, with Dentil Praia Clube

== Death ==
Walewska died on the night of 21 September 2023 while travelling to São Paulo for the launch of her book. According to the Civil Police, who are investigating the circumstances, she fell from the 17th floor of a building in the Jardins neighbourhood, west of central São Paulo. According to the document, the incident took place at 6:09 pm on that date.

According to a police report obtained by the newspaper O Tempo, Walewska left a letter on the table in the leisure area, together with a bottle of wine with a glass, both half-full with wine, as well as a cellphone and a folder containing the letter, which was apparently a farewell message from her.

Walewska's death is being investigated as a suicide. Four death notes were found, each addressed towards someone, namely Walewska's parents, her brother, her friend and best man Luiz Gustavo Del Maestro, and two friends from volleyball, coach Bernardinho and player Virna Dias. Dias revealed that in her letter, Walewska wrote that the instigator for the suicide was discovering her husband had a child with another woman.

Awards
Preceded by (Poland) Eleonora Dziękiewicz	Best Blocker of FIVB World Grand Prix; 2008	Succeeded by (Brazil) Fabiana Claudino
