= Michelle Pavão =

Brazilian volleyball player (born 1986)

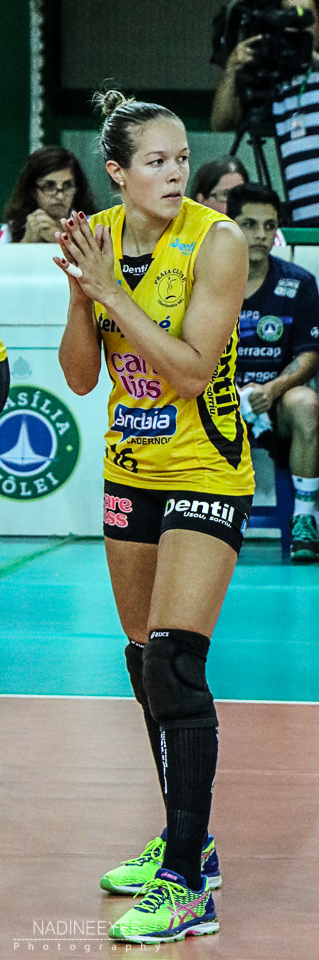

Personal information
- Full name: Michelle Marinho Pavão
- Born: 31 October 1986 (age 39); Rio de Janeiro, Brazil
- Height: 1.78 m (70 in)
- Weight: 62 kg (137 lb)
- Spike: 295 cm (116 in)
- Block: 283 cm (111 in)

Volleyball information
- Position: Outside Spiker
- Current club: (Brazil) Osasco/São Cristóvão Saúde
- Number: 10

National team
2013–2015	Brazil
Honours
Women's volleyball
Representing Brazil
World Grand Champions Cup
Gold medal – first place	2013 Japan	Team
World Grand Prix
Gold medal – first place	2013 Sapporo	Team
Pan American Games
Silver medal – second place	2015 Toronto	Team
South American Championship
Gold medal – first place	2013 Ica

Michelle Marinho Pavão (born 31 October 1986) is a Brazilian female volleyball player. She is part of the Brazil women's national volleyball team. On club level she played for BRASÍLIA VÔLEI in 2014. She often competes alongside her twin sister Monique.

== Clubs ==
- (Brazil) Rio de Janeiro (2004–2005)
- (Brazil) Macaé Sports (2005–2007)
- (Brazil) Rio de Janeiro (2007–2010)
- (Brazil) Minas Tênis Clube (2010–2011)
- (Brazil) SESI-SP (2011–2012)
- (Brazil) Praia Clube (2012–2014)
- (Brazil) Brasília Vôlei (2014–2015)
- (Brazil) Praia Clube (2015–2017)
- (Brazil) Fluminense FC (2017–2018)
- (Brazil) Praia Clube (2018–2021)
- (Brazil) Osasco/São Cristóvão Saúde (2021–)

== Awards ==
=== Clubs ===
- 2007–08 Brazilian Superliga – Champion, with Rexona/Ades
- 2008–09 Brazilian Superliga – Champion, with Rexona/Ades
- 2018–19 Brazilian Superliga – Runner-Up, with Dentil/Praia Clube
- 2020–21 Brazilian Superliga – Runner-Up, with Dentil/Praia Clube
- 2017 South American Club Championship – Runner-up, with Dentil/Praia Clube
- 2019 South American Club Championship – Runner-up, with Dentil/Praia Clube
- 2020 South American Club Championship – Runner-up, with Dentil/Praia Clube
