= Natasha Farinea =

Brazilian volleyball player (born 1986)

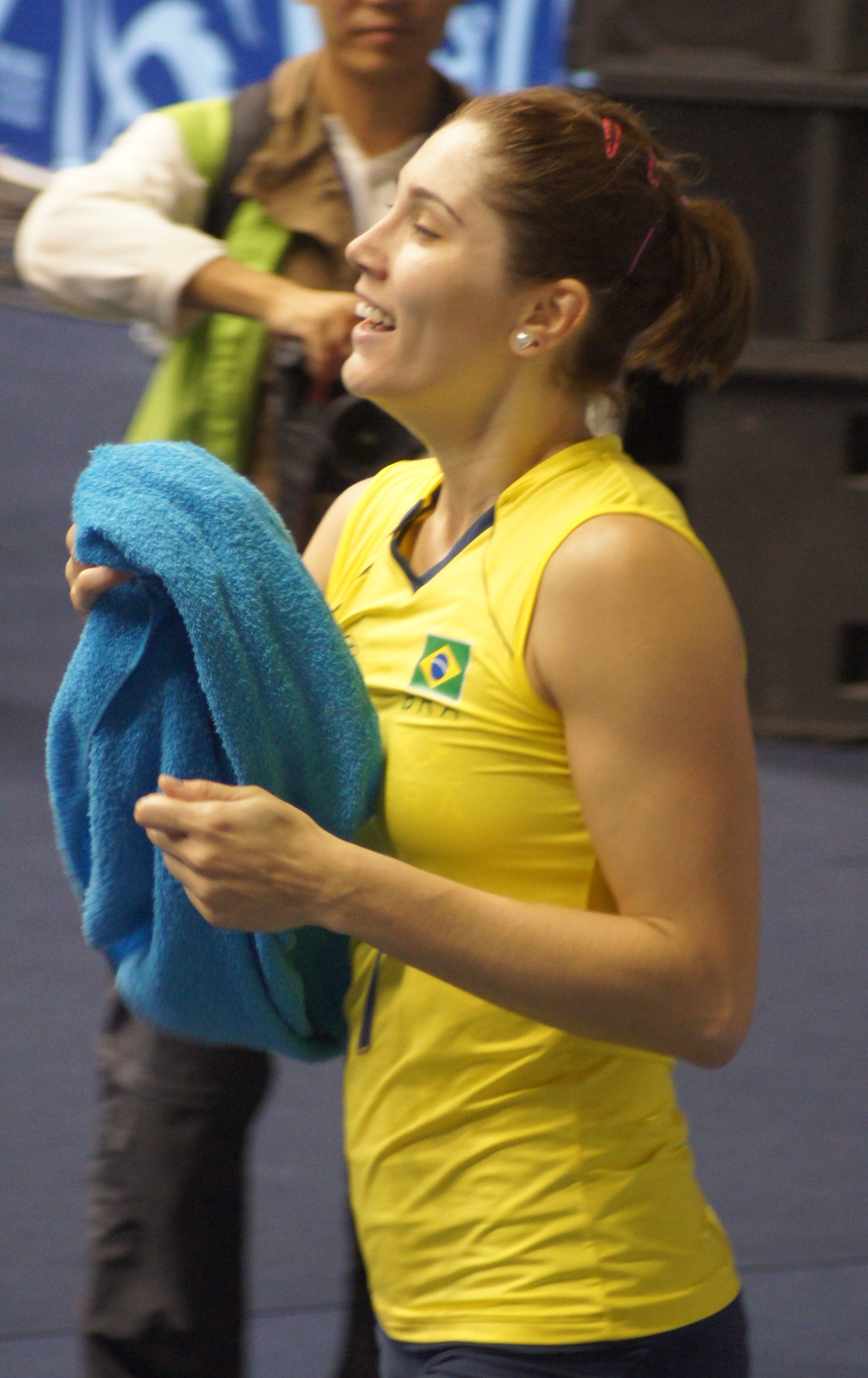
- Farinea at the 2011 Military World Games

Personal information
- Full name: Natasha Odara Azevedo Cruz Farinéa
- Born: 8 February 1986 (age 40); Porto Murtinho, Mato Grosso do Sul
- Height: 1.88 m (6 ft 2 in)
- Weight: 78 kg (172 lb)
- Spike: 300 cm (118 in)
- Block: 288 cm (113 in)

Volleyball information
- Position: Middle blocker

National team
2012	Brazil
Honours
Women's volleyball
Representing Brazil
Pan-American Cup
Silver medal – second place	2012 Mexico	Team

Natasha Farinea (born 8 February 1986) is a Brazilian volleyball player. She won a silver medal at the 2013 FIVB Volleyball Women's Club World Championship with Unilever Vôlei.

== Clubs ==
- (Brazil) São Caetano (2004–2009)
- (Brazil) Minas Tênis Clube (2009–2012)
- (Brazil) Vôlei Amil/Campinas (2012–2013)
- (Brazil) Rio de Janeiro (2013–2014)
- (Brazil) Praia Clube (2014–2018)
- (Brazil) Osasco/Audax (2018–2019)
- (Brazil) Fluminense FC (2019–)

== Awards ==
=== Individuals ===
- 2012 Pan-American Cup – "Best Blocker"
- 2013 Summer Universiade – "Best Blocker"

=== Clubs ===
- 2013–14 Brazilian Superliga – Champion, with Rexona-Ades
- 2015–16 Brazilian Superliga – Runner-up, with Praia Clube
- 2017–18 Brazilian Superliga – Champion, with Praia Clube
- 2013 South American Club Championship – Champion, with Rexona-Ades
- 2013 FIVB Club World Championship – Runner-up, with Rexona-Ades
