= Volleyball at the 2012 Summer Olympics – Women's tournament South American qualification =

The South American qualification tournament for the 2012 Women's Olympic Volleyball Tournament was held from May 9 to May 13, 2012.

== Venue ==
- Ginásio Milton Olaio Filho, São Carlos, São Paulo, Brazil

== Preliminary round ==
- All times are BRT (UTC−03:00).

=== Pool A ===
Pos	Team	Pld	W	L	Pts	SPW	SPL	SPR	SW	SL	SR	Qualification
1	Brazil	2	2	0	6	150	71	2.113	6	0	MAX	Semifinals
2	Colombia	2	1	1	3	123	129	0.953	3	3	1.000	Semifinals
3	Uruguay	2	0	2	0	77	150	0.513	0	6	0.000	

Date	Time		Score		Set 1	Set 2	Set 3	Set 4	Set 5	Total	Report
9 May	19:30	Brazil	3–0	Uruguay	25–4	25–12	25–7			75–23	P2P3
10 May	18:00	Brazil	3–0	Colombia	25–11	25–18	25–19			75–48	P2P3
11 May	19:30	Colombia	3–0	Uruguay	25–21	25–14	25–19			75–54	P2P3

=== Pool B ===
Pos	Team	Pld	W	L	Pts	SPW	SPL	SPR	SW	SL	SR	Qualification
1	Peru	3	3	0	9	247	153	1.614	9	1	9.000	Semifinals
2	Venezuela	3	2	1	6	238	230	1.035	7	4	1.750	Semifinals
3	Argentina	3	1	2	3	213	195	1.092	4	6	0.667	
4	Chile	3	0	3	0	125	225	0.556	0	9	0.000	

Date	Time		Score		Set 1	Set 2	Set 3	Set 4	Set 5	Total	Report
9 May	14:30	Peru	3–0	Chile	25–14	25–11	25–6			75–31	P2P3
9 May	17:00	Argentina	1–3	Venezuela	25–19	20–25	17–25	23–25		85–94	P2P3
10 May	13:00	Peru	3–1	Venezuela	25–15	25–16	22–25	25–13		97–69	P2P3
10 May	15:30	Argentina	3–0	Chile	25–11	25–6	25–9			75–26	P2P3
11 May	14:30	Chile	0–3	Venezuela	11–25	15–25	22–25			48–75	P2P3
11 May	17:00	Argentina	0–3	Peru	17–25	15–25	21–25			53–75	P2P3

== Final round ==
=== Championship ===
Semifinals
2012-05-12 – São Carlos
Peru	3
Colombia	2
2012-05-12 – São Carlos
Brazil	3
Venezuela	0

Final
2012-05-13 – São Carlos
Peru	0
Brazil	3
Third place
2012-05-13 – São Carlos
Venezuela	3
Colombia	2

=== Semifinals ===
Date	Time		Score		Set 1	Set 2	Set 3	Set 4	Set 5	Total	Report
12 May	13:30	Peru	3–2	Colombia	25–19	15–25	22–25	25–11	17–15	104–95	P2 P3
12 May	16:00	Brazil	3–0	Venezuela	25–14	25–15	25–23			75–52	P2P3

=== Third place ===
Date	Time		Score		Set 1	Set 2	Set 3	Set 4	Set 5	Total	Report
13 May	16:00	Colombia	2–3	Venezuela	25–18	20–25	25–20	24–26	13–15	107–104	P2P3

=== First place ===
Date	Time		Score		Set 1	Set 2	Set 3	Set 4	Set 5	Total	Report
13 May	18:30	Peru	0–3	Brazil	12–25	16–25	9–25			37–75	P2P3

== Final standing ==
Rank	Team
1	Brazil
2	Peru
3	Venezuela
4	Colombia
5	Argentina
5	Uruguay
7	Chile

== Individual awards ==
- MVP: Fernanda Garay (BRA)
- Best scorer: Madelaynne Montaño (COL)
- Best spiker: Fernanda Garay (BRA)
- Best blocker: Thaísa Menezes (BRA)
- Best server: Elena Keldibekova (PER)
- Best digger: Elena Berroterran (VEN)
- Best setter: Fabíola de Souza (BRA)
- Best receiver: Lucia Gaido (ARG)
- Best libero: Elena Berroterran (VEN)
