= Monique Pavão =

Brazilian volleyball player (born 1986)

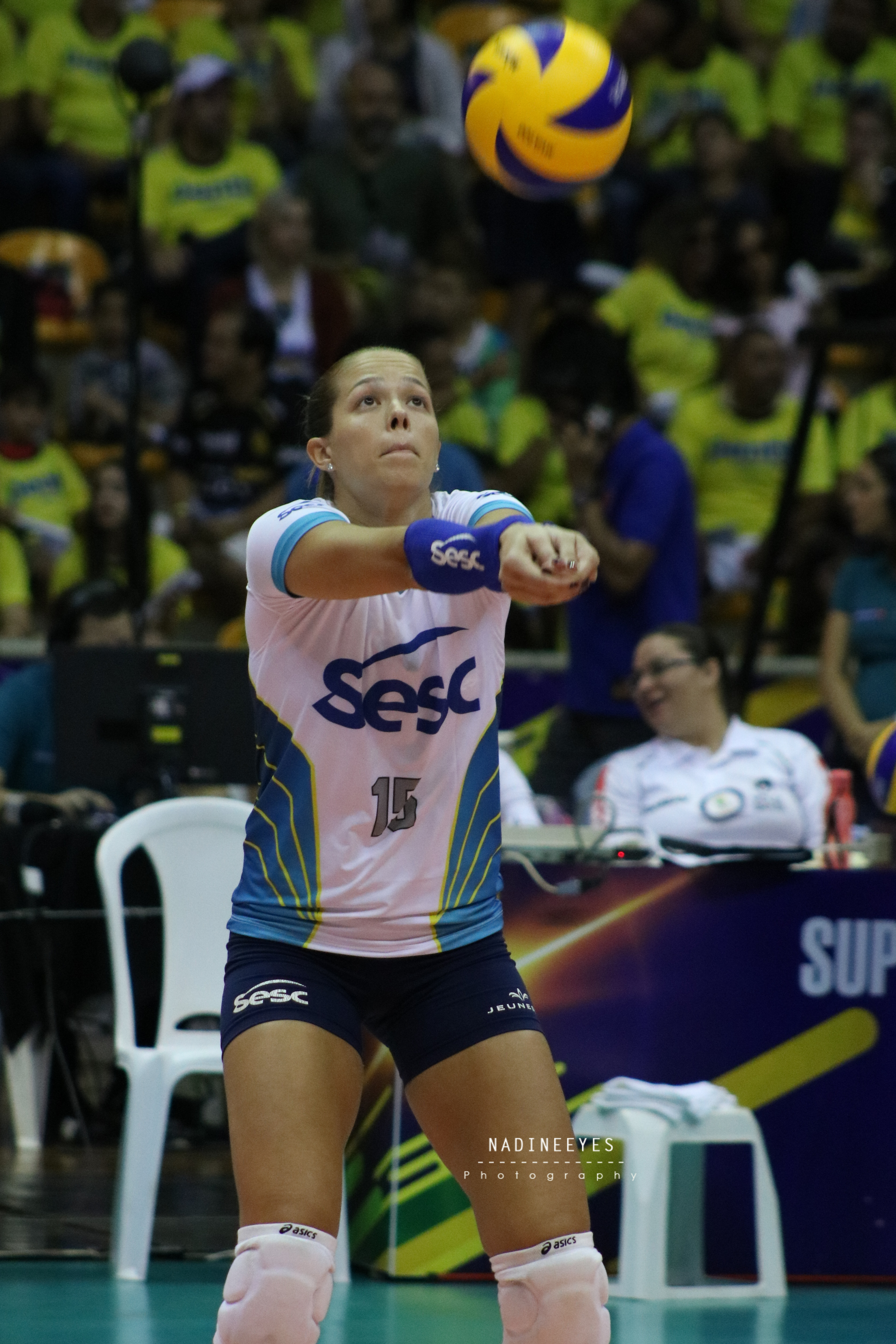
- Pavão in 2018

Personal information
- Full name: Monique Marinho Pavão
- Born: 31 October 1986 (age 39); Rio de Janeiro, Brazil
- Height: 1.78 m (70 in)
- Weight: 67 kg (148 lb)
- Spike: 294 cm (116 in)
- Block: 285 cm (112 in)

Volleyball information
- Position: Opposite spiker
- Current club: (Brazil) Sesc-RJ/Flamengo
- Number: 15

National team
| 2013–2018 | Brazil |
Honours
Representing Brazil
World Grand Champions Cup
| Gold medal – first place | 2013 Japan | Team |
| Silver medal – second place | 2017 Japan | Team |
World Grand Prix
| Gold medal – first place | 2013 Sapporo | Team |
| Gold medal – first place | 2014 Tokyo | Team |
| Gold medal – first place | 2017 Nanjing | Team |
| Bronze medal – third place | 2015 Omaha | Team |
South American Championship
| Gold medal – first place | 2013 Ica |
| Gold medal – first place | 2015 Cartagena |
| Gold medal – first place | 2017 Cali |

Monique Marinho Pavão (born 31 October 1986) is a female Brazilian volleyball player. She is part of the Brazil women's national volleyball team. On club level she played for SESI in 2014. She often competes alongside her twin sister Michelle.

== Clubs ==
- (Brazil) Macaé (2004–2007)
- (Brazil) Rio de Janeiro (2007–2010)
- (Brazil) Macaé (2010–2011)
- (Brazil) Praia Clube (2011–2014)
- (Brazil) SESI São Paulo (2014–2015)
- (Brazil) Rio de Janeiro (2015–2019)
- (Brazil) Praia Clube (2019–2021)
- (Brazil) Sesc-RJ/Flamengo (2021–)

== Awards ==
=== Individuals ===
- 2017 South American Club Championship – "Best opposite spiker"

=== Clubs ===
- 2015–16 Brazilian Superliga – Champion, with Rexona-Ades
- 2016–17 Brazilian Superliga – Champion, with Rexona-SESC
- 2017–18 Brazilian Superliga – Runner-up, with SESC Rio
- 2020–21 Brazilian Superliga – Runner-up, with Dentil/Praia Clube
- 2016 South American Club Championship – Champion, with Rexona-Ades
- 2017 South American Club Championship – Champion, with Rexona-SESC
- 2018 South American Club Championship – Runner-up, with SESC Rio
- 2020 South American Club Championship – Runner-up, with Dentil/Praia Clube
- 2017 FIVB Club World Championship – Runner-up, with Rexona-SESC
