= Andrea Moraes =

Brazilian volleyball player (born 1969)

Personal information
- Full name: Andrea Leopoldina Aparecida de Moraes
- Born: 28 July 1969 (age 57); São Paulo, Brazil
- Height: 1.86 m (6 ft 1 in)
- Weight: 74 kg (163 lb)

Volleyball information
- Position: Outside spiker

National team
Brazil
Honours
Women's volleyball
Representing Brazil
World Grand Prix
Gold medal – first place	1994 Shanghai

Andrea Moraes (born 28 July 1969) is a Brazilian female volleyball player. She was part of the Brazil women's national volleyball team.

She participated in the 1994 FIVB Volleyball Women's World Championship. On club level she played with Rio Fone.

== Clubs ==
- Rio Fone (1994)
