= 2013 FIVB Volleyball World Grand Prix =

International women's volleyball tournament

2013 World Grand Prix
Tournament details
- Host country: Japan (Final)
- Dates: 2 August – 1 September
- Teams: 20 (6 in Final Round)
- Venue: 1 (in 1 host city)

Final positions
- Champions: Brazil (9th title)

Tournament awards
- MVP: Thaisa Menezes (BRA)

The 2013 FIVB Volleyball World Grand Prix was the 21st edition of the annual women's international volleyball tournament played by 20 countries from 2 August to 1 September 2013.

== Competing nations ==
=== Qualification process ===
Competition	Date	Venue	Vacancies	Qualified
Automatically Qualified			4	China; Japan; Poland; Brazil
2012 European League	June 1 – July 6, 2012	Karlovy Vary, Czech Republic	4	Czech Republic; Bulgaria; Serbia; Netherlands
2012 Pan-American Cup	July 12–21, 2012	Ciudad Juarez, Mexico	1 (CSV)^{[a]}	Argentina
2012 Pan-American Cup	July 12–21, 2012	Ciudad Juarez, Mexico	4 (NORCECA)^{[a]}	United States; Cuba; Dominican Republic; Puerto Rico
2012 Asian Cup	September 10–16, 2012	Almaty, Kazakhstan	2	Thailand; Kazakhstan
FIVB Appointed			4	Italy; Russia; Turkey; Germany
CAVB Appointed			1	Algeria
Total			20	

- ^{[a]} The top four NORCECA teams and the top from CSV confederation, other than Brazil, at the 2012 Pan-American Cup qualified.

== Calendar ==
The original list was released December 1, 2012; one day later on December 2 a new list was released to the public.

Week 1 2–4 August 2013
Group A: Campinas, Brazil	Group B: Santo Domingo, Dominican Rep.	Group C: Ankara, Turkey	Group D: Macau, China	Group E: Montichiari, Italy
Brazil; United States; Poland; Russia	Dominican Republic; Serbia; Puerto Rico; Czech Republic	Turkey; Japan; Thailand; Algeria	China; Cuba; Netherlands; Bulgaria	Italy; Germany; Argentina; Kazakhstan
Week 2 9–11 August 2013
Group F: Belgrade, Serbia	Group G: Mayagüez, Puerto Rico	Group H: Płock, Poland	Group I: Hong Kong, China	Group J: Yekaterinburg, Russia
Serbia; United States; Netherlands; Algeria	Puerto Rico; Brazil; Dominican Republic; Bulgaria	Poland; Japan; Germany; Kazakhstan	China; Turkey; Czech Republic; Argentina	Russia; Italy; Thailand; Cuba
Week 3 16–18 August 2013
Group K: Almaty, Kazakhstan	Group L: Bangkok, Thailand	Group M: Sendai, Japan	Group N: Wuhan, China	Group O: Kaohsiung, Chinese Taipei
Kazakhstan; Brazil; Cuba; Netherlands	Thailand; Russia; Germany; Puerto Rico	Japan; United States; Czech Republic; Bulgaria	China; Serbia; Poland; Argentina	Italy; Turkey; Dominican Republic; Algeria
Week 4 Final Round 28 August–1 September 2013
Sapporo
Japan China; Brazil; Serbia; United States; Italy

== Preliminary round ==
=== Ranking ===
Japan (finals host) and the top five teams in the preliminary round will advance to the final round.

Pos	Team	Pld	W	L	Pts	SW	SL	SR	SPW	SPL	SPR	Qualification
1	China	9	9	0	25	27	6	4.500	775	627	1.236	Qualified for the final round
2	Brazil	9	8	1	23	25	8	3.125	786	625	1.258	Qualified for the final round
3	Serbia	9	7	2	23	25	8	3.125	759	640	1.186	Qualified for the final round
4	United States	9	8	1	22	25	9	2.778	785	648	1.211	Qualified for the final round
5	Italy	9	7	2	21	24	9	2.667	773	660	1.171	Qualified for the final round
6	Japan	9	7	2	19	22	12	1.833	792	703	1.127	Qualified as hosts for the final round
7	Russia	9	7	2	19	24	14	1.714	849	783	1.084	
8	Turkey	9	6	3	19	23	12	1.917	809	697	1.161	
9	Bulgaria	9	6	3	19	22	13	1.692	798	719	1.110	
10	Dominican Republic	9	6	3	17	18	14	1.286	786	749	1.049	
11	Germany	9	4	5	16	21	17	1.235	852	769	1.108	
12	Netherlands	9	4	5	12	14	15	0.933	619	599	1.033	
13	Thailand	9	3	6	10	11	20	0.550	671	672	0.999	
14	Czech Republic	9	2	7	8	11	22	0.500	686	760	0.903	
15	Poland	9	2	7	6	11	23	0.478	721	769	0.938	
16	Argentina	9	2	7	5	10	22	0.455	683	815	0.838	
17	Kazakhstan	9	1	8	4	8	25	0.320	623	790	0.789	
18	Puerto Rico	9	1	8	2	5	26	0.192	568	750	0.757	
19	Cuba	9	0	9	0	3	27	0.111	537	734	0.732	
20	Algeria	9	0	9	0	0	27	0.000	312	675	0.462	

All times are local for the host city

=== First round ===
==== Pool A ====
- Venue: Arena Concórdia, Campinas, Brazil

Date	Time		Score		Set 1	Set 2	Set 3	Set 4	Set 5	Total	Report
2 Aug	16:30	Russia	1–3	United States	20–25	25–17	21–25	12–25		78–92	P2 P3
2 Aug	19:00	Brazil	3–1	Poland	21–25	25–17	25–15	25–20		96–77	P2 P3
3 Aug	10:00	Brazil	3–2	Russia	26–28	26–24	25–19	22–25	15–8	114–104	P2 P3
3 Aug	12:30	United States	3–0	Poland	25–22	25–23	25–16			75–61	P2 P3
4 Aug	10:00	Brazil	3–1	United States	17–25	25–23	25–18	25–20		92–86	P2 P3
4 Aug	12:30	Russia	3–2	Poland	25–21	22–25	29–27	28–30	15–13	119–116	P2 P3

==== Pool B ====
- Venue: Palácio del Voleibol, Santo Domingo, Dominican Republic

Date	Time		Score		Set 1	Set 2	Set 3	Set 4	Set 5	Total	Report
2 Aug	17:00	Puerto Rico	0–3	Czech Republic	14–25	20–25	18–25			52–75	P2 P3
2 Aug	19:30	Dominican Republic	0–3	Serbia	13–25	20–25	16–25			49–75	P2 P3
3 Aug	16:00	Serbia	3–0	Czech Republic	28–26	25–18	25–23			78–67	P2 P3
3 Aug	18:00	Dominican Republic	3–0	Puerto Rico	25–14	26–24	25–21			76–59	P2 P3
4 Aug	16:00	Serbia	3–1	Puerto Rico	25–22	22–25	25–17	25–22		97–86	P2 P3
4 Aug	18:00	Dominican Republic	3–1	Czech Republic	25–22	25–20	23–25	25–18		98–85	P2 P3

==== Pool C ====
- Venue: Başkent Volleyball Hall, Ankara, Turkey

Date	Time		Score		Set 1	Set 2	Set 3	Set 4	Set 5	Total	Report
2 Aug	14:00	Turkey	3–0	Algeria	25–13	25–18	25–15			75–46	P2 P3
2 Aug	17:00	Thailand	0–3	Japan	19–25	17–25	21–25			57–75	P2 P3
3 Aug	14:00	Algeria	0–3	Japan	10–25	8–25	8–25			26–75	P2 P3
3 Aug	17:00	Turkey	3–0	Thailand	25–23	26–24	25–22			76–69	P2 P3
4 Aug	14:00	Thailand	3–0	Algeria	25–7	25–14	25–13			75–34	P2 P3
4 Aug	17:00	Japan	3–1	Turkey	25–21	30–28	18–25	25–18		98–92	P2 P3

==== Pool D ====
- Venue: Macau Forum, Macau

Date	Time		Score		Set 1	Set 2	Set 3	Set 4	Set 5	Total	Report
2 Aug	17:00	Cuba	0–3	Netherlands	20–25	14–25	11–25			45–75	P2 P3
2 Aug	20:30	China	3–0	Bulgaria	25–13	26–24	25–23			76–60	P2 P3
3 Aug	14:30	Bulgaria	3–1	Netherlands	20–25	25–15	25–20	25–23		95–83	P2 P3
3 Aug	17:00	China	3–0	Cuba	25–13	25–20	25–15			75–48	P2 P3
4 Aug	13:00	Bulgaria	3–0	Cuba	25–8	25–15	25–16			75–39	P2 P3
4 Aug	15:30	China	3–1	Netherlands	26–24	19–25	25–17	25–17		95–83	P2 P3

==== Pool E ====
- Venue: PalaGeorge, Montichiari, Italy

Date	Time		Score		Set 1	Set 2	Set 3	Set 4	Set 5	Total	Report
2 Aug	17:30	Germany	3–1	Kazakhstan	23–25	25–23	25–19	25–17		98–84	P2 P3
2 Aug	20:30	Italy	3–0	Argentina	25–21	25–20	25–17			75–58	P2 P3
3 Aug	17:30	Germany	2–3	Argentina	23–25	25–13	25–18	21–25	12–15	106–96	P2 P3
3 Aug	20:30	Italy	3–0	Kazakhstan	28–26	25–17	25–13			78–56	P2 P3
4 Aug	17:30	Argentina	3–2	Kazakhstan	15–25	25–15	23–25	25–20	15–9	103–94	P2 P3
4 Aug	20:45	Italy	3–1	Germany	25–23	25–20	24–26	25–20		99–89	P2 P3

=== Second round ===
==== Pool F ====
- Venue: Pionir Hall, Belgrade, Serbia

Date	Time		Score		Set 1	Set 2	Set 3	Set 4	Set 5	Total	Report
9 Aug	17:30	Serbia	3–0	Netherlands	25–18	25–16	25–21			75–55	P2 P3
9 Aug	20:15	Algeria	0–3	United States	12–25	15–25	11–25			38–75	P2 P3
10 Aug	17:30	Algeria	0–3	Serbia	11–25	12–25	11–25			34–75	P2 P3
10 Aug	20:15	United States	3–0	Netherlands	25–20	25–16	25–12			75–48	P2 P3
11 Aug	17:30	Netherlands	3–0	Algeria	25–15	25–7	25–6			75–28	P2 P3
11 Aug	20:15	Serbia	2–3	United States	14–25	25–22	17–25	25–23	12–15	93–110	P2 P3

==== Pool G ====
- Venue: Palacio de Recreación y Deportes, Mayagüez, Puerto Rico

Date	Time		Score		Set 1	Set 2	Set 3	Set 4	Set 5	Total	Report
9 Aug	17:00	Dominican Republic	1–3	Brazil	25–20	22–25	12–25	18–25		77–95	P2 P3
9 Aug	20:00	Puerto Rico	0–3	Bulgaria	21–25	20–25	10–25			51–75	P2 P3
10 Aug	17:00	Bulgaria	3–1	Brazil	25–22	25–21	20–25	25–21		95–89	P2 P3
10 Aug	20:00	Dominican Republic	3–0	Puerto Rico	25–22	25–23	25–20			75–65	P2 P3
11 Aug	17:00	Bulgaria	2–3	Dominican Republic	22–25	25–18	23–25	30–28	14–16	114–112	P2 P3
11 Aug	20:00	Puerto Rico	0–3	Brazil	14–25	15–25	17–25			46–75	P2 P3

==== Pool H ====
- Venue: Orlen Arena, Płock, Poland

Date	Time		Score		Set 1	Set 2	Set 3	Set 4	Set 5	Total	Report
9 Aug	17:30	Germany	2–3	Japan	25–18	25–20	20–25	22–25	12–15	104–103	P2 P3
9 Aug	20:00	Poland	3–0	Kazakhstan	25–17	25–17	25–11			75–45	P2 P3
10 Aug	17:30	Japan	3–1	Kazakhstan	23–25	25–19	25–18	25–20		98–82	P2 P3
10 Aug	20:00	Poland	0–3	Germany	17–25	17–25	24–26			58–76	P2 P3
11 Aug	17:30	Kazakhstan	1–3	Germany	14–25	11–25	25–20	19–25		69–95	P2 P3
11 Aug	20:00	Poland	0–3	Japan	19–25	24–26	15–25			58–76	P2 P3

==== Pool I ====
- Venue: Hong Kong Coliseum, Hong Kong

Date	Time		Score		Set 1	Set 2	Set 3	Set 4	Set 5	Total	Report
9 Aug	18:00	Turkey	3–1	Argentina	25–17	25–14	34–36	25–18		109–85	P2 P3
9 Aug	20:30	China	3–0	Czech Republic	25–14	25–17	25–13			75–44	P2 P3
10 Aug	13:15	Turkey	3–0	Czech Republic	25–23	25–18	25–15			75–56	P2 P3
10 Aug	15:45	China	3–0	Argentina	25–17	26–24	25–22			76–63	P2 P3
11 Aug	13:15	Argentina	1–3	Czech Republic	20–25	25–21	22–25	20–25		87–96	P2 P3
11 Aug	15:45	China	3–2	Turkey	19–25	25–17	25–20	15–25	15–10	99–97	P2 P3

==== Pool J ====
- Venue: DIVS Uralochka, Yekaterinburg, Russia

Date	Time		Score		Set 1	Set 2	Set 3	Set 4	Set 5	Total	Report
9 Aug	17:00	Italy	1–3	Russia	13–25	25–18	18–25	24–26		80–94	P2 P3
9 Aug	19:30	Cuba	1–3	Thailand	21–25	17–25	25–21	19–25		82–96	P2 P3
10 Aug	17:00	Thailand	0–3	Russia	20–25	23–25	22–25			65–75	P2 P3
10 Aug	19:30	Cuba	0–3	Italy	16–25	16–25	20–25			52–75	P2 P3
11 Aug	17:00	Russia	3–1	Cuba	25–17	25–14	16–25	25–17		91–73	P2 P3
11 Aug	19:30	Italy	3–0	Thailand	25–18	25–14	29–27			79–59	P2 P3

=== Third round ===
==== Pool K ====
- Venue: Baluan Sholak Palace of Culture and Sports, Almaty, Kazakhstan

Date	Time		Score		Set 1	Set 2	Set 3	Set 4	Set 5	Total	Report
16 Aug	15:00	Cuba	0–3	Brazil	16–25	11–25	20–25			47–75	P2 P3
16 Aug	18:00	Kazakhstan	0–3	Netherlands	23–25	14–25	16–25			53–75	P2 P3
17 Aug	15:00	Brazil	3–0	Netherlands	25–15	25–20	25–15			75–50	P2 P3
17 Aug	18:00	Kazakhstan	3–1	Cuba	25–20	17–25	30–28	25–20		97–93	P2 P3
18 Aug	15:00	Cuba	0–3	Netherlands	13–25	23–25	22–25			58–75	P2 P3
18 Aug	18:00	Kazakhstan	0–3	Brazil	17–25	16–25	10–25			43–75	P2 P3

==== Pool L ====
- Venue: Indoor Stadium Huamark, Bangkok, Thailand

Date	Time		Score		Set 1	Set 2	Set 3	Set 4	Set 5	Total	Report
16 Aug	15:00	Thailand	3–1	Puerto Rico	18–25	25–7	25–22	25–11		93–65	P2 P3
16 Aug	18:30	Germany	2–3	Russia	25–22	25–17	18–25	19–25	11–15	98–104	P2 P3
17 Aug	14:00	Russia	3–0	Puerto Rico	25–8	25–16	25–19			75–43	P2 P3
17 Aug	16:30	Thailand	0–3	Germany	16–25	14–25	25–27			55–77	P2 P3
18 Aug	14:00	Puerto Rico	3–2	Germany	25–23	25–23	23–25	13–25	15–13	101–109	P2 P3
18 Aug	16:30	Russia	3–2	Thailand	24–26	25–18	25–22	20–25	15–11	109–102	P2 P3

==== Pool M ====
- Venue: Sendai Gymnasium, Sendai, Japan

Date	Time		Score		Set 1	Set 2	Set 3	Set 4	Set 5	Total	Report
16 Aug	15:30	United States	3–0	Czech Republic	25–20	25–20	25–23			75–63	P2 P3
16 Aug	18:15	Japan	0–3	Bulgaria	23–25	23–25	29–31			75–81	P2 P3
17 Aug	12:30	Japan	1–3	United States	17–25	19–25	25–21	18–25		79–96	P2 P3
17 Aug	15:30	Czech Republic	2–3	Bulgaria	25–20	18–25	17–25	25–22	8–15	93–107	P2 P3
18 Aug	12:30	Japan	3–2	Czech Republic	25–18	22–25	28–26	23–25	15–13	113–107	P2 P3
18 Aug	15:30	United States	3–2	Bulgaria	16–25	25–23	20–25	25–15	15–8	101–96	P2 P3

==== Pool N ====
- Venue: Wuhan Sports Center Gymnasium, Wuhan, China

Date	Time		Score		Set 1	Set 2	Set 3	Set 4	Set 5	Total	Report
16 Aug	16:00	Serbia	3–1	Poland	25–14	25–20	22–25	25–21		97–80	P2 P3
16 Aug	19:30	China	3–0	Argentina	25–18	25–17	25–16			75–51	P2 P3
17 Aug	16:00	Argentina	0–3	Serbia	12–25	20–25	14–25			46–75	P2 P3
17 Aug	19:30	China	3–1	Poland	25–18	25–21	16–25	25–23		91–87	P2 P3
18 Aug	16:00	Poland	3–2	Argentina	25–21	21–25	25–12	23–25	15–11	109–94	P2 P3
18 Aug	19:30	China	3–2	Serbia	25–17	25–27	25–20	23–25	15–5	113–94	P2 P3

==== Pool O ====
- Venue: Kaohsiung Arena, Kaohsiung, Chinese Taipei

Date	Time		Score		Set 1	Set 2	Set 3	Set 4	Set 5	Total	Report
16 Aug	15:00	Italy	3–0	Algeria	25–13	25–19	25–10			75–42	P2 P3
16 Aug	18:00	Turkey	3–2	Dominican Republic	25–27	22–25	25–22	26–24	15–13	113–111	P2 P3
17 Aug	15:00	Algeria	0–3	Turkey	12–25	12–25	12–25			36–75	P2 P3
17 Aug	17:30	Italy	2–3	Dominican Republic	25–21	25–19	30–32	24–26	11–15	115–113	P2 P3
18 Aug	15:00	Italy	3–2	Turkey	25–17	25–18	17–25	15–25	15–12	97–97	P2 P3
18 Aug	17:30	Dominican Republic	3–0	Algeria	25–11	25–9	25–8			75–28	P2 P3

== Final round ==
=== Final ranking ===
Pos	Team	Pld	W	L	Pts	SW	SL	SR	SPW	SPL	SPR
1	Brazil	5	5	0	15	15	0	MAX	378	269	1.405
2	China	5	4	1	10	12	8	1.500	445	424	1.050
3	Serbia	5	3	2	8	10	9	1.111	428	421	1.017
4	Japan	5	1	4	5	7	12	0.583	394	414	0.952
5	Italy	5	1	4	4	7	14	0.500	421	481	0.875
6	United States	5	1	4	3	6	14	0.429	394	451	0.874

=== Pool Final ===
- Venue: Hokkaido Prefectural Sports Center, Sapporo, Japan

Date	Time		Score		Set 1	Set 2	Set 3	Set 4	Set 5	Total	Report
28 Aug	13:30	Serbia	1–3	China	21–25	25–22	17–25	20–25		83–97	P2 P3
28 Aug	15:30	Brazil	3–0	United States	25–19	25–12	25–10			75–41	P2 P3
28 Aug	19:10	Japan	3–0	Italy	25–18	25–19	25–22			75–59	P2 P3
29 Aug	13:30	United States	1–3	Serbia	23–25	25–20	18–25	23–25		89–95	P2 P3
29 Aug	15:30	Italy	2–3	China	30–28	22–25	28–26	13–25	10–15	103–119	P2 P3
29 Aug	19:10	Japan	0–3	Brazil	21–25	22–25	17–25			60–75	P2 P3
30 Aug	13:30	China	3–0	United States	25–20	25–23	25–17			75–60	P2 P3
30 Aug	15:30	Brazil	3–0	Italy	25–16	26–24	25–11			76–51	P2 P3
30 Aug	19:10	Serbia	3–0	Japan	25–22	25–17	25–19			75–58	P2 P3
31 Aug	13:30	Italy	3–2	United States	19–25	25–22	23–25	25–18	16–14	108–104	P2 P3
31 Aug	15:30	Brazil	3–0	Serbia	27–25	25–21	25–22			77–68	P2 P3
31 Aug	19:10	Japan	2–3	China	16–25	25–18	24–26	25–21	13–15	103–105	P2 P3
1 Sep	13:30	Serbia	3–2	Italy	22–25	25–23	20–25	25–16	15–11	107–100	P2 P3
1 Sep	15:30	China	0–3	Brazil	15–25	14–25	20–25			49–75	P2 P3
1 Sep	19:10	United States	3–2	Japan	17–25	25–19	18–25	25–17	15–12	100–98	P2 P3

- All times are local for the host city.

== Final standing ==
Rank	Team
Gold medal	Brazil
Silver medal	China
Bronze medal	Serbia
4	Japan
5	Italy
6	United States
7	Russia
8	Turkey
9	Bulgaria
10	Dominican Republic
11	Germany
12	Netherlands
13	Thailand
14	Czech Republic
15	Poland
16	Argentina
17	Kazakhstan
18	Puerto Rico
19	Cuba
20	Algeria

2013 FIVB World Grand Prix winners

Brazil
9th title

Team roster
Fabiana Claudino (c), Danielle Lins, Adenízia da Silva, Thaísa Menezes, Priscila Daroit, Claudia Silva, Michelle Pavão, Gabriela Guimarães, Sheilla Castro, Fabiana Oliveira, Monique Pavão, Fernanda Rodrigues
Head coach
José Roberto Guimarães

== Awards ==
- Most valuable player
  (Brazil) Thaisa Menezes
- Best setter
  (United States) Alisha Glass
- Best Outside Spikers
  (China) Zhu Ting
  (Serbia) Brankica Mihajlović
- Best Middle Blockers
  (Brazil) Thaisa Menezes
  (Serbia) Milena Rašić
- Best opposite spiker
  (Serbia) Jovana Brakočević
- Best libero
  (Brazil) Fabiana de Oliveira
