= Natalia Dianskaya =

Russian volleyball player

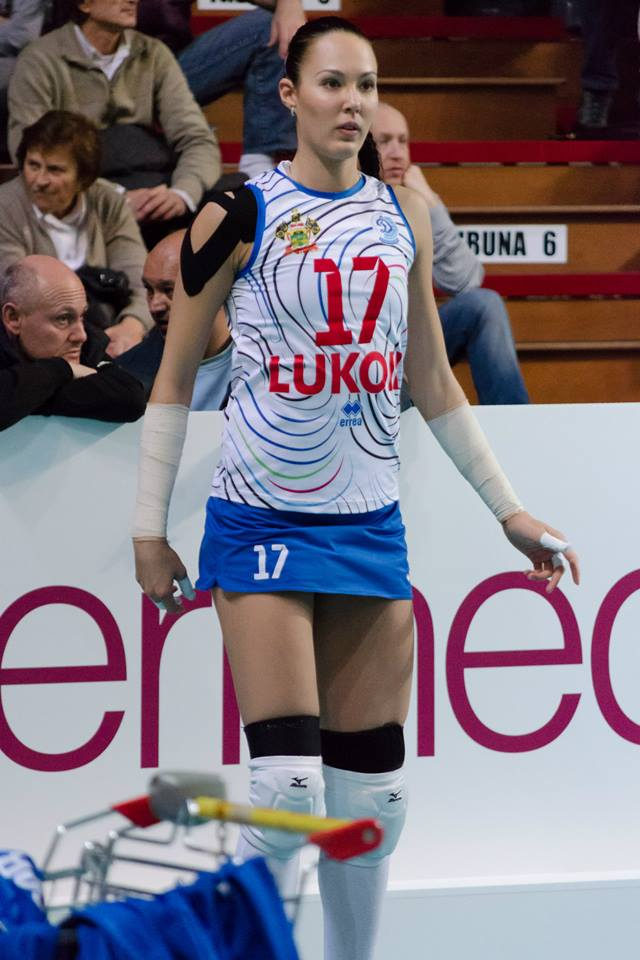
- Dianskaya in 2014

Personal information
- Nationality: Russian
- Born: March 10, 1989 (age 37)
- Height: 1.86 m (6 ft 1 in)
- Weight: 64 kg (141 lb)
- Spike: 310 cm (120 in)
- Block: 295 cm (116 in)

Volleyball information
- Current club: (Russia) WVC Dinamo Krasnodar
- Number: 11

Natalia Dianskaya (born 7 March 1989) is a Russian volleyball player.

== Career ==
In volleyball, Dianskaya played for the Women's National Team at the 2013 FIVB Women's World Grand Champions Cup.

She played for Dinamo Krasnodar.
