= Hitomi Nakamichi =

Japanese volleyball player (born 1985)

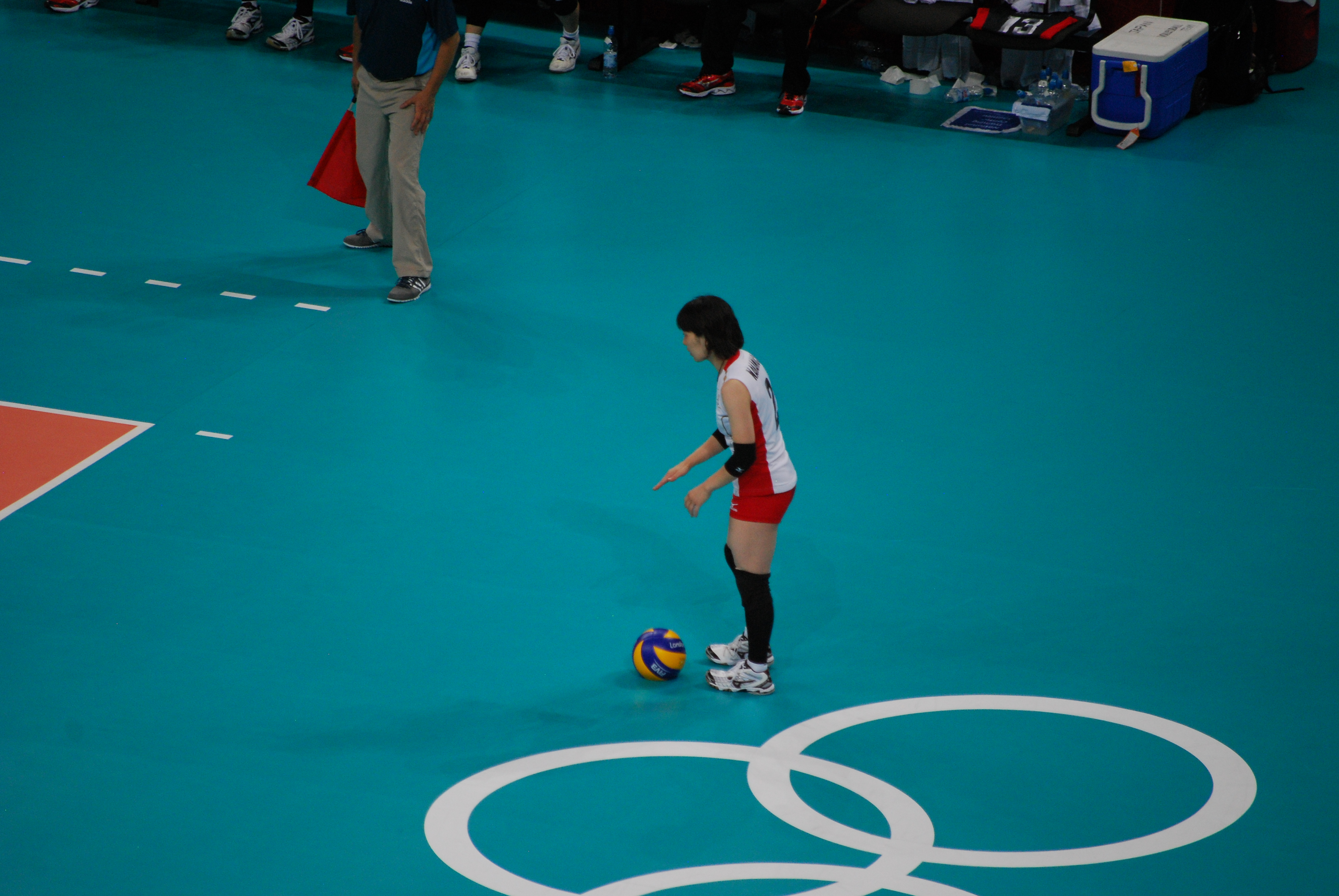
- Nakamichi at the 2012 Summer Olympics

Personal information
- Full name: Hitomi Nakamichi
- Nickname: Michi
- Born: September 18, 1985 (age 41); Joyo, Kyoto, Japan
- Height: 159 cm (5 ft 3 in)
- Weight: 53 kg (117 lb)
- Spike: 264 cm (104 in)

Volleyball information
- Position: Setter
- Current club: Retired

National team
Japan
Honours
Women's volleyball
Representing Japan
Olympic Games
Bronze medal – third place	2012 London	Team
World Championship
Bronze medal – third place	2010 Japan	Team
World Grand Champions Cup
Bronze medal – third place	2013 Japan	Team
Asian Championship
Silver medal – second place	2011 Taipei

Hitomi Nakamichi (中道 瞳, Nakamichi Hitomi; born September 18, 1985) is a former Japanese volleyball player who played for Toray Arrows. She has served as captain of the team since 2013. She was also part of the Japanese team that won the bronze medal at the 2012 Summer Olympics.

She retired from volleyball in 2015.

== Clubs ==
- (Japan) KyotoTachibana high school
- (Japan) Toray Arrows (2004–2017)

== Awards ==
=== Individual ===
- 2007–08 V.Premier League – Best6
- 2008–09 V.Premier League – Best6
- 2009 58th Kurowashiki All Japan Volleyball Tournament – Best6
- 2011 Montreux Volley Masters – MVP
- 2011–12 V.Premier League – Best6.
- 2013 FIVB Women's World Grand Champions Cup – Best Setter

=== Team ===
- 2007 Domestic Sports Festival (Volleyball) – Champion, with Toray Arrows.
- 2007–2008 Empress's Cup – Champion, with Toray Arrows.
- 2007–2008 V.Premier League – Champion, with Toray Arrows.
- 2008 Domestic Sports Festival – Runner-Up, with Toray Arrows.
- 2008–2009 V.Premier League – Champion, with Toray Arrows.
- 2009 Kurowashiki All Japan Volleyball Tournament – Champion, with Toray Arrows.
- 2009–2010 V.Premier League – Champion, with Toray Arrows.
- 2010 Kurowashiki All Japan Volleyball Tournament – Champion, with Toray Arrows.
- 2010–2011 V.Premier League – Runner-up, with Toray Arrows.
- 2011–2012 V.Premier League – Champion, with Toray Arrows.
- 2012–2013 V.Premier League – Runner-up, with Toray Arrows.

=== National team ===
- 2010 World Championship – Bronze Medal
- 2011 Montreux Volley Masters – Champion
- 2011 4th place in the World Cup in Japan
- 2012 Bronze Medal in the Olympic Games of London
- 2013 FIVB Women's World Grand Champions Cup – Bronze Medal
