= Fernanda Garay =

Brazilian volleyball player (born 1986)

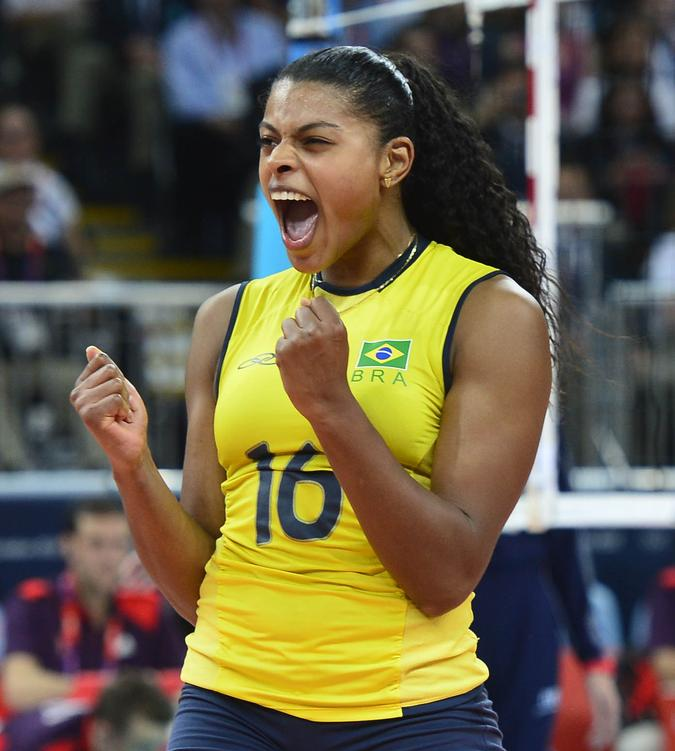
- Garay at the 2012 Summer Olympics

Personal information
- Full name: Fernanda Garay Rodrigues
- Nickname: Fê Garay
- Born: May 10, 1986 (age 40); Porto Alegre, Rio Grande do Sul, Brazil
- Height: 1.79 m (5 ft 10 in)
- Weight: 74 kg (163 lb)
- Spike: 308 cm (121 in)
- Block: 288 cm (113 in)

Volleyball information
- Position: Wing spiker
- Current club: (Brazil) Praia Clube

National team
2010–2021	Brazil
Honours
Women's volleyball
Representing Brazil
Olympic Games
Gold medal – first place	2012 London	Team
Silver medal – second place	2020 Tokyo	Team
World Championship
Silver medal – second place	2010 Japan	Team
Bronze medal – third place	2014 Italy	Team
World Grand Champions Cup
Gold medal – first place	2013 Tokyo/Nagoya	Team
World Grand Prix
Gold medal – first place	2013 Sapporo	Team
Gold medal – first place	2014 Tokyo	Team
Gold medal – first place	2016 Bangkok	Team
Silver medal – second place	2011 Macau	Team
Silver medal – second place	2012 Ningbo	Team
Pan American Games
Gold medal – first place	2011 Guadalajara	Team
Silver medal – second place	2015 Toronto	Team
South American Championship
Gold medal – first place	2011 Callao	Team
Gold medal – first place	2013 Ica	Team
Gold medal – first place	2015 Cartagena	Team
FIVB Nations League
Silver medal – second place	2021 Rimini	Team
- Last updated: November 2021

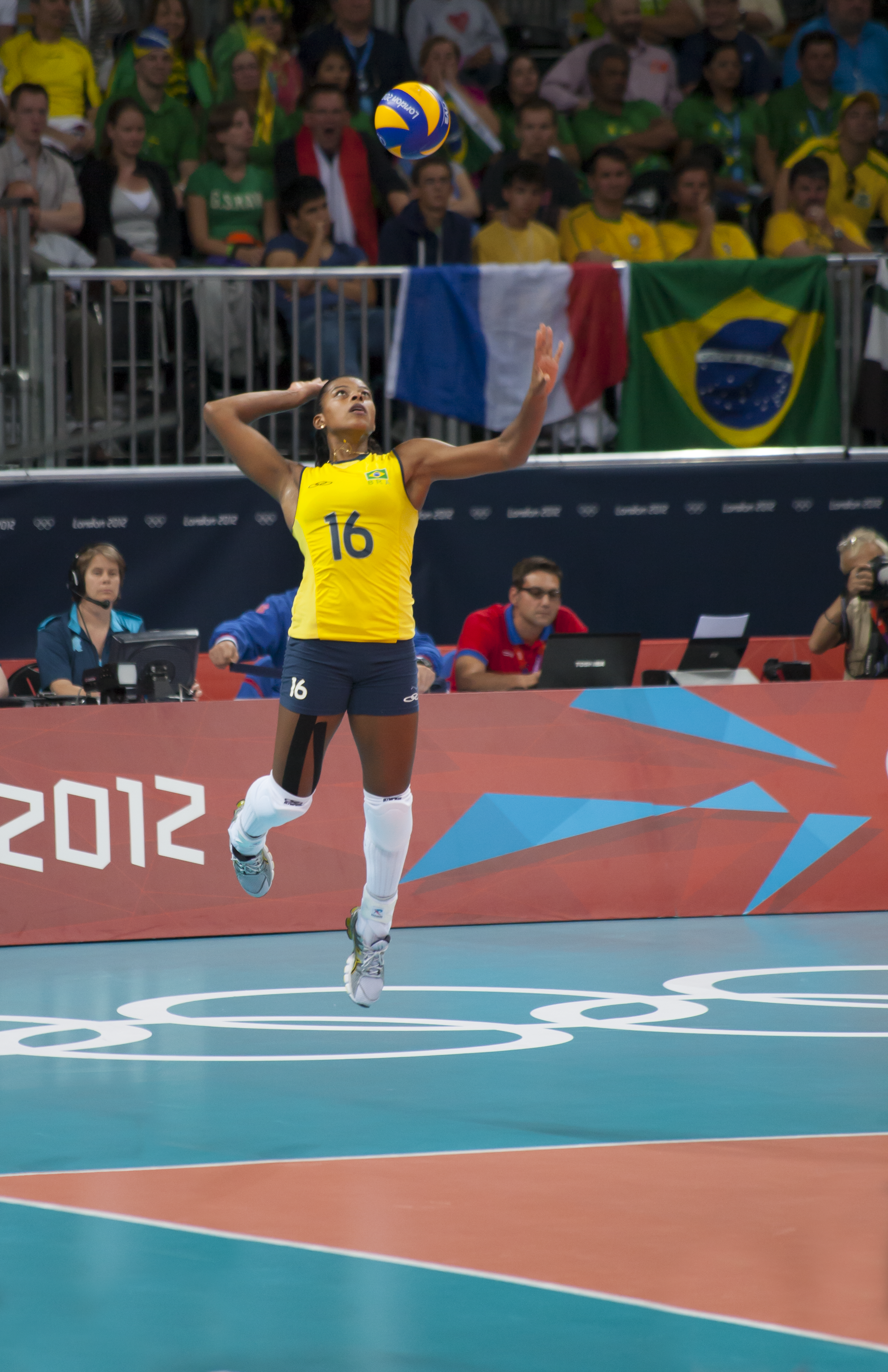
Garay at the 2012 Summer Olympics

Fernanda Garay Rodrigues (born May 10, 1986) is a Brazilian retired professional volleyball player who won the 2012 Summer Olympics gold medal and the silver medal at 2020 Tokyo Summer Olympics with the Brazilian national team. She is 1.79 m (5 ft 10 in) tall. She played with Praia Clube.

== Career ==
Garay is a military sergeant. She played at the 2011 Military World Games volleyball tournament, winning the gold medal and the Most Valuable Player and Best Spiker individual awards.

Playing with Sollys Nestlé Osasco, Garay won the gold medal in the 2012 FIVB Club World Championship held in Doha, Qatar.

Garay was awarded Best Spiker of the 2012/13 season of the Brazilian Superliga playing with Sollys/Nestlé. She was announced to play for Fenerbahçe for the 2013/14 club season.

Garay won one of the Best Outside Hitters awards during the 2013 South American Championship. Her National Team won the Continental Championship qualifying to the 2013 World Grand Champions Cup and the 2014 World Championship.

After signing with the Russian club, Dinamo Krasnodar for 2014/2015, Garay won the Russian Cup title and the 2015 FIVB Club World Championship silver medal when her team lost to the Turkish Eczacibasi VitrA in the championship match. She was recognized with the Best Outside Spiker individual award. She previously announced the extension of her contract with Krasnodar for the 2015/2016 season, but the club experienced financial problems that led her sign with Dinamo Moscow for that season. With this team, she won the bronze medal of the Russian Cup in December 2015 and the Russian league championship in 2016 with a perfect season.

Garay won the silver medal at the 2015 Pan American Games when her national team was defeated in the championship match 0–3 by the United States.

After winning silver at 2020 Summer Olympics, Garay announced her retirement from international competitions along with libero Camila Brait.

== Clubs ==
- (Brazil) São Caetano (2002–2004)
- (Brazil) MRV/Minas (2004–2005)
- (Brazil) Fiat/Minas (2005–2008)
- (Brazil) Pinheiros/Mackenzie (2008–2010)
- (Japan) NEC Red Rockets (2010–2011)
- (Brazil) Vôlei Futuro (2011–2012)
- (Brazil) Sollys/Nestlé (2012–2013)
- (Turkey) Fenerbahçe Istanbul (2013–2014)
- (Russia) Dinamo Krasnodar (2014–2015)
- (Russia) Dinamo Moscow (2015–2016)
- (China) Guangdong Evergrande (2016–2017)
- (Brazil) Praia Clube (2017–2021)

== Awards ==
- 2011 Military World Games – "Most valuable player"
- 2011 Military World Games – "Best spiker"
- 2011 World Grand Prix – "Best receiver"
- 2011 South American Championship – "Best receiver"
- 2012 Summer Olympics South American qualification tournament – "Most valuable player"
- 2012 Summer Olympics South American qualification tournament – "Best spiker"
- 2012 Summer Olympics – "Best receiver"
- 2012 South American Club Championship – "Best receiver"
- 2012–13 Brazilian Superliga – "Best spiker"
- 2013 Montreux Volley Masters – "Most valuable player"
- 2013 South American Championship – "Best outside spiker"
- 2015 FIVB Club World Championship – "Best outside spiker"
- 2019 South American Club Championship – "Best outside spiker"

=== Clubs ===
- 2012–13 Brazilian Superliga – Runner-up, with Sollys Nestlé Osasco
- 2014 Russian Cup – Champion, with Dinamo Krasnodar
- 2015–16 Russian Super League – Champion, with Dinamo Moscow
- 2017–18 Brazilian Superliga – Champion, with Dentil/Praia Clube
- 2018–19 Brazilian Superliga – Runner-up, with Dentil/Praia Clube
- 2020–21 Brazilian Superliga – Runner-up, with Dentil/Praia Clube
- 2013–14 CEV Cup – Champion, with Fenerbahçe
- 2014–15 CEV Cup – Champion, with Dinamo Krasnodar
- 2012 South American Club Championship – Champion, with Sollys Nestlé Osasco
- 2012 FIVB Club World Championship – Champion, with Sollys Nestlé Osasco
- 2015 FIVB Club World Championship – Runner-up, with Dinamo Krasnodar
- 2019 South American Club Championship – Runner-up, with Dentil/Praia Clube
- 2020 South American Club Championship – Runner-up, with Dentil/Praia Clube
