= Arisa Satō =

Japanese volleyball player (born 1989)

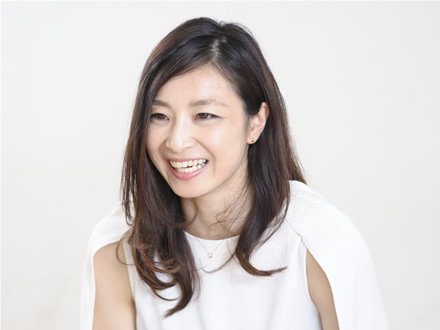
- Arisa Sato at aff interview in 2019

Personal information
- Full name: Arisa Satō
- Nickname: Rear
- Born: July 18, 1989 (age 37); Sendai, Miyagi, Japan
- Hometown: Miyagi, Japan
- Height: 1.64 m (5 ft 4 1/2 in)
- Weight: 53 kg (117 lb)
- Spike: 275 cm (108 in)
- Block: 266 cm (105 in)

Volleyball information
- Position: Libero
- Current club: Ligare Sendai

National team
Japan
Medal record
Women's volleyball
Representing Japan
Asian Championship
Silver medal – second place	2013 Nakhon Ratchasima	Team

Arisa Satō (佐藤あり紗, Satō Arisa, born 18 July 1989) is a Japanese volleyball player who plays for Hitachi Rivale. She also plays for Japan women's national volleyball team.

== Clubs ==
- (Japan) Furukawa Gakuen Highschool
- (Japan) Tohoku Fukushi University
- (Japan) Hitachi Rivale (2012-2018)
- (Japan) Ligare Sendai (2018-)

== Awards ==
=== Individual ===
- 2013 - V.Challenge League Serve Receive Award
- 2013 - World Grand Champions Cup Best Libero
- 2013-14 V.Premier League - Best Receive Award

=== Team ===
- 2013 - V.challenge League - Runner-Up, with Hitachi Rivale

=== National team ===
- 2013 - Asian Championship Silver medal
- 2013 - World Grand Champions Cup Bronze medal

Awards
Preceded by (Brazil) Fabiana de Oliveira	Best Libero of FIVB World Grand Champions Cup; 2013	Succeeded by (Japan) Kotoe Inoue
