= 2022 Women's South American Volleyball Club Championship =

16th official edition of the Women's South American Volleyball Club Championship

2022 Women's South American Club Championship
Tournament details
- Host country: Brazil
- Dates: 6 to 10 May
- Teams: 6
- Venue: 1 (in 1 host city)

Final positions
- Champions: (Brazil) Minas (6th title)

Tournament awards
- MVP: (Brazil) Kisy

The 2022 Women's South American Volleyball Club Championship was the 35th official edition of the Women's South American Volleyball Club Championship, played by six teams from May 6 to May 10, 2022, in Uberlândia, Brazil.

Gerdau Minas won its six and overall title, and qualified for the 2022 FIVB Volleyball Women's Club World Championship.

== Teams ==
Pool
(Bolivia) San Martn
(Brazil) Gerdau Minas
(Brazil) Praia
(Brazil) SESI Bauru
(Chile) Boston College
(Peru) Regatas Lima

== Preliminary round ==
=== Group A ===
Pos	Team	Pld	W	L	Pts	SW	SL	SR	SPW	SPL	SPR	Qualification
1	(Brazil) Praia	2	2	0	6	6	2	3.000	173	86	2.012	Semifinals
2	(Peru) Regatas Lima	2	1	1	3	4	3	1.333	138	135	1.022	Semifinals
3	(Bolivia) San Martín	2	0	2	0	0	6	0.000	60	150	0.400	

Date		Score		Set 1	Set 2	Set 3	Set 4	Set 5	Total
6 May	Praia (Brazil)	3–0	(Bolivia) San Martín	25–6	25–7	25–10			75–23
7 May	Praia (Brazil)	3–1	(Peru) Regatas Lima	25–12	23–25	25–13	25–13		98–63
8 May	Regatas Lima (Peru)	3–0	(Bolivia) San Martín	25–13	25–13	25–11			75–37

=== Group B ===
Pos	Team	Pld	W	L	Pts	SW	SL	SR	SPW	SPL	SPR	Qualification
1	(Brazil) Gerdau Minas	2	2	0	6	6	0	MAX	150	78	1.923	Semifinals
2	(Brazil) SESI Bauru	2	1	1	3	3	3	1.000	121	114	1.061	Semifinals
3	(Chile) Boston College	2	0	2	0	0	6	0.000	71	150	0.473	

Date		Score		Set 1	Set 2	Set 3	Set 4	Set 5	Total
6 May	Gerdau Minas (Brazil)	3–0	(Chile) Boston College	25–13	25–12	25–18			75–43
7 May	Gerdau Minas (Brazil)	3–0	(Brazil) SESI Bauru	25–20	25–15	25–19			75–53
8 May	SESI Bauru (Brazil)	3–0	(Chile) Boston College	25–21	25–9	25–17			75–47

== Final round ==
=== Bracket ===
Semifinals
9 May
(Brazil) Praia	3
(Brazil) SESI Bauru	0
9 May
(Brazil) Gerdau Minas	3
(Peru) Regatas Lima	0

Final
10 May
(Brazil) Praia	2
(Brazil) Gerdau Minas	3
3rd place
10 May
(Brazil) SESI Bauru	3
(Peru) Regatas Lima	0

=== Fifth place match ===
Date		Score		Set 1	Set 2	Set 3	Set 4	Set 5	Total
9 May	San Martín (Bolivia)	0–3	(Chile) Boston College	22–25	14–25	16–25			52–75

=== Semifinals ===
Date		Score		Set 1	Set 2	Set 3	Set 4	Set 5	Total
9 May	Gerdau Minas (Brazil)	3–0	(Peru) Regatas Lima	25–10	25–19	25–20			75–49
9 May	Praia (Brazil)	3–0	(Brazil) SESI Bauru	25–21	27–25	25–21			77–67

=== Third place match ===
Date		Score		Set 1	Set 2	Set 3	Set 4	Set 5	Total
10 May	SESI Bauru (Brazil)	3–0	(Peru) Regatas Lima	29–27	25–18	25–21			79–66

=== Final ===
Date		Score		Set 1	Set 2	Set 3	Set 4	Set 5	Total
10 May	Praia (Brazil)	2–3	(Brazil) Gerdau Minas	22–25	25–20	25–16	21–25	13–15	106–101

== Final standing ==
Rank	Team
1st place, gold medalist(s)	(Brazil) Gerdau Minas
2nd place, silver medalist(s)	(Brazil) Praia
3rd place, bronze medalist(s)	(Brazil) SESI Bauru
4	(Peru) Regatas Lima
5	(Chile) Boston College
6	(Bolivia) San Martín

Qualified for the 2022 FIVB Volleyball Women's Club World Championship

2022 Women's South American Volleyball Club Championship

Gerdau Minas
6th title

== All-Star team ==
The following players were chosen for the tournament's "All-Star team":

- Most valuable player
  - (Brazil) Kisy (Gerdau Minas)
- Best Opposite
  - (Brazil) Kisy (Gerdau Minas)
- Best outside hitters
  - (Brazil) Priscila Daroit (Gerdau Minas)
  - (Netherlands) Anne Buijs (Praia)
- Best setter
  - (Brazil) Macris Carneiro (Gerdau Minas)
- Best libero
  - (Brazil) Léia Silva (Gerdau Minas)
- Best middle blockers
  - (Brazil) Ana Carolina da Silva (Praia)
  - (Brazil) Adenízia da Silva (SESI Bauru)

== See also ==
- 2022 Men's South American Volleyball Club Championship
