= 2021 Women's South American Volleyball Club Championship =

13th official edition of the Women's South American Volleyball Club Championship

2021 Women's South American Club Championship
Tournament details
- Host country: Brazil
- Dates: 21 to 25 October
- Teams: 5
- Venue: 1 (in 1 host city)

Final positions
- Champions: (Brazil) Praia (1st title)

Tournament awards
- MVP: (Brazil) Cláudia Bueno

The 2021 Women's South American Volleyball Club Championship was the 34th official edition of the Women's South American Volleyball Club Championship, played by five teams from October 21 to October 25, 2020, in Brasília, Brazil.

Praia won its first title, and qualified for the 2021 FIVB Volleyball Women's Club World Championship.

== Pools composition ==
Pool
(Bolivia) San Martín
(Brazil) Minas Tênis
(Brazil) Praia
(Brazil) Brasília Vôlei
(Uruguay) San Martín

== Round-robin pool ==
- All times are Brasília Time (UTC−03:00).

Pos	Team	Pld	W	L	Pts	SW	SL	SR	SPW	SPL	SPR	Qualification
1	(Brazil) Praia	4	4	0	11	12	2	6.000	248	166	1.494	Champions and qualified for the 2021 Club World Championship
2	(Brazil) Minas Tênis	4	3	1	10	11	4	2.750	339	223	1.520	
3	(Brazil) Brasília Vôlei	4	2	2	6	7	6	1.167	301	249	1.209	
4	(Uruguay) Olimpia	4	1	3	3	3	10	0.300	179	319	0.561	
5	(Bolivia) San Martín	4	0	4	0	1	12	0.083	196	329	0.596	

Date	Time		Score		Set 1	Set 2	Set 3	Set 4	Set 5	Total	Report
21 Oct	19:00	Brasília Vôlei (Brazil)	1–3	(Brazil) Minas Tênis	25–23	22–25	15–25	20–25		82–98	–
21 Oct	21:00	Praia (Brazil)	3–0	(Uruguay) Olimpia	25–10	25–11	25–8			75–29	
22 Oct	19:00	Praia (Brazil)	3–0	(Brazil) Brasília Vôlei	25–19	25–18	34–32			84–69	
22 Oct	21:00	Olimpia (Uruguay)	3–0	(Bolivia) San Martín	25–21	25–14	21–25	31–29		102–89	
23 Oct	19:00	Minas Tênis (Brazil)	3–0	(Uruguay) Olimpia	25–16	25–10	25–19			75–45	
23 Oct	21:00	Praia (Brazil)	3–0	(Bolivia) San Martín	25–12	25–10	25–12			75–34	
24 Oct	19:00	Minas Tênis (Brazil)	3–0	(Bolivia) San Martín	25–14	25–13	25–12			75–39	
24 Oct	21:00	Brasília Vôlei (Brazil)	3–0	(Uruguay) Olimpia	25–14	25–8	25–11			75–33	
25 Oct	19:00	Brasília Vôlei (Brazil)	3–0	(Bolivia) San Martín	25–8	25–13	25–13			75–34	
25 Oct	21:00	Minas Tênis (Brazil)	2–3	(Brazil) Praia	17–25	25–21	17–25	25–19	7–15	91–105	

== Final standing ==
Rank	Team
1st place, gold medalist(s)	(Brazil) Praia
2nd place, silver medalist(s)	(Brazil) Minas Tênis
3rd place, bronze medalist(s)	(Brazil) Brasília Vôlei
4	(Uruguay) Olimpia
5	(Bolivia) San Martín

Qualified for the 2021 Club World Championship

2021 Women's South American Volleyball Club Championship

Praia
1st title

== All-Star team ==
The following players were chosen for the tournament's "All-Star team":

- Most valuable player
  - (Brazil) Cláudia Bueno (Praia)
- Best Opposite
  - (Dominican Republic) Brayelin Martínez (Praia)
- Best outside hitters
  - (Netherlands) Anne Bujis (Praia)
  - (Brazil) Kasiely Clemente (Minas Tênis)
- Best setter
  - (Brazil) Ana Cristina Porto (Brasília Vôlei)
- Best middle blockers
  - (Brazil) Caroline Gattaz (Minas Tênis)
  - (Brazil) Thaisa Daher (Minas Tênis)
- Best libero
  - (Brazil) Léia Silva (Minas Tênis)

== See also ==
- 2021 Men's South American Volleyball Club Championship
