= 2013 FIVB Volleyball Women's World Grand Champions Cup =

International Volleyball Event held in 2013

2013 Women's World Grand Champions Cup
Tournament details
- Host country: Japan
- Dates: 12–17 November
- Teams: 6
- Venue: 2 (in 2 host cities)

Final positions
- Champions: Brazil (2nd title)
- Runners-up: United States
- Third place: Japan

Tournament awards
- MVP: Fabiana Claudino

The 2013 FIVB Women's World Grand Champions Cup was held in Nagoya and Tokyo, Japan from November 12 to 17, 2013. Brazil won their second title and Brazilian Fabiana Claudino was selected the Most Valuable Player.

== Teams ==
Team	Qualified as
Japan	Host Nation
Russia	2013 European Champions
Thailand	2013 Asian Champions
Brazil	2013 South American Champions
United States	2013 NORCECA Champions
Dominican Republic	Wild Card

== Competition formula ==
The competition formula of the 2013 Women's World Grand Champions Cup was a single Round-Robin system. Each team played once against each of the five remaining teams. Points were accumulated during the whole tournament, and the final standing was determined by the total points gained.

== Venues ==
Opening Ceremony and First Round	Award Ceremony and Second Round
Nagoya, Japan	Tokyo, Japan
Nippon Gaishi Hall	Tokyo Metropolitan Gymnasium
Capacity: 10,000	Capacity: 10,000

== Results ==
Pos	Team	Pld	W	L	Pts	SW	SL	SR	SPW	SPL	SPR
1	Brazil	5	5	0	15	15	2	7.500	421	342	1.231
2	United States	5	4	1	10	12	9	1.333	464	449	1.033
3	Japan	5	3	2	9	10	7	1.429	403	393	1.025
4	Russia	5	1	4	4	8	13	0.615	465	470	0.989
5	Thailand	5	1	4	4	5	13	0.385	391	421	0.929
6	Dominican Republic	5	1	4	3	6	12	0.500	367	436	0.842

=== Nagoya round ===
- Venue: Nippon Gaishi Hall, Nagoya, Japan

Date	Time		Score		Set 1	Set 2	Set 3	Set 4	Set 5	Total	Report
12 Nov	12:10	Thailand	0–3	Dominican Republic	23–25	21–25	23–25			67–75	67–75
12 Nov	15:40	United States	0–3	Brazil	24–26	24–26	20–25			68–77	P2 P3
12 Nov	19:10	Japan	3–1	Russia	25–20	26–28	25–16	26–24		102–88	P2 P3
13 Nov	12:10	Brazil	3–0	Thailand	25–18	25–17	25–17			75–52	P2 P3
13 Nov	16:10	Russia	3–1	Dominican Republic	25–14	22–25	25–23	25–15		97–77	P2 P3
13 Nov	19:10	Japan	1–3	United States	19–25	19–25	25–19	21–25		84–94	P2 P3

=== Tokyo round ===
- Venue: Tokyo Metropolitan Gymnasium, Tokyo, Japan

Date	Time		Score		Set 1	Set 2	Set 3	Set 4	Set 5	Total	Report
15 Nov	12:10	Dominican Republic	1–3	Brazil	20–25	15–25	25–22	19–25		79–97	79–97
15 Nov	16:10	United States	3–2	Russia	16–25	25–22	25–19	24–26	15–13	105–105	P2 P3
15 Nov	19:10	Thailand	0–3	Japan	20–25	27–29	22–25			69–79	P2 P3
16 Nov	12:10	United States	3–2	Thailand	13–25	27–25	25–22	21–25	15–13	101–110	P2 P3
16 Nov	16:10	Russia	1–3	Brazil	25–18	18–25	22–25	19–25		84–93	P2 P3
16 Nov	19:10	Japan	3–0	Dominican Republic	25–17	25–19	29–27			79–63	P2 P3
17 Nov	12:10	Dominican Republic	1–3	United States	14–25	16–25	25–21	18–25		73–96	P2 P3
17 Nov	15:10	Thailand	3–1	Russia	18–25	25–22	25–21	25–23		93–91	P2 P3
17 Nov	18:10	Brazil	3–0	Japan	29–27	25–14	25–18			79–59	P2 P3

== Final standing ==
Rank	Team
1st place, gold medalist(s)	Brazil
2nd place, silver medalist(s)	United States
3rd place, bronze medalist(s)	Japan
4	Russia
5	Thailand
6	Dominican Republic

2013 FIVB Women's World Grand Champions Cup champions

Brazil
Second title

Team roster:
Fabiana Claudino (C), Adenízia da Silva, Claudia Silva, Michelle Pavão, Tandara Caixeta, Natália Pereira, Sheilla Castro, Fabiana de Oliveira (L), Monique Pavão, Fernanda Garay, Fabiola de Souza, Camila Brait (L), Walewska Oliveira, Carol Gattaz.
Head coach: José Roberto Guimarães

== Awards ==
- Most valuable player
  (Brazil) Fabiana Claudino
- Best setter
  (Japan) Hitomi Nakamichi
- Best Outside Spikers
  (Japan) Saori Sakoda
  (Thailand) Onuma Sittirak
- Best Middle Blockers
  (Russia) Iuliia Morozova
  (Thailand) Pleumjit Thinkaow
- Best opposite spiker
  (Dominican Republic) Gina Mambrú
- Best libero
  (Japan) Arisa Sato
