= Praia Clube =

Brazilian women's volleyball team

- Full name: Dentil/Praia Clube
- Short name: Praia Clube
- Founded: 1989
- Ground: Ginásio Oranides Borges do Nascimento, Uberlandia (Capacity: 1,730)
- Chairman: (Brazil) Aldorando Dias de Souza
- Head coach: (Portugal) Rui Moreira
- League: Brazilian Superleague
- 2025-26: Champions
- Website: Club home page

Uniforms
| Home | Away |

Praia Clube (Brazilian Portuguese pronunciation: [ˈpɾajɐ ˈklubi]) is a social and sports club from Uberlândia, Minas Gerais. It is best known for its professional volleyball teams which play in the Brazilian Women's and Men's Superleague.

== Women's team ==
=== Titles and honours ===
==== International ====
- South American Championship (3): 2021, 2023, and 2025

==== National ====
- Brazilian Cup: (1): 2024
- Brazilian Super League (first tier) (2): 2017-18, 2022-23 and 2025-26
- Brazilian League (second tier) (2): 2008 and 2010

==== Regional ====
- Minas Gerais State Championship (8): 2006, 2011, 2012, 2013, 2014, 2015, 2019, 2021

=== Team ===
Season 2022-2023 squad

Team roster - season 2025-26
| Number | Player | Position | Height (m) | Birth date |
|---|---|---|---|---|
| 2 | (Brazil) Natália Araújo | Libero | 1.62 | April 10, 1997 (age 29) |
| 3 | (Brazil) Macris Carneiro | Setter | 1.78 | March 3, 1989 (age 37) |
| 4 | (United States) Morgahn Fingall | Opposite | 1.87 | May 6, 2001 (age 25) |
| 5 | (Brazil) Adenízia Silva | Middle Blocker | 1.89 | December 18, 1986 (age 39) |
| 6 | (Brazil) Maria Clara Andrade | Outside Hitter | 1.82 | August 2, 2004 (age 21) |
| 7 | (Brazil) Gabriela Martins | Middle Blocker | 1.87 | March 5, 1996 (age 30) |
| 8 | (Brazil) Juliana Carrijo | Setter | 1.90 | February 25, 1992 (age 34) |
| 9 | (Bulgaria) Maria Yordanova | Outside Hitter | 1.85 | May 25, 2002 (age 23) |
| 10 | (Brazil) Michelle Pavão | Opposite | 1.78 | October 31, 1986 (age 39) |
| 12 | (Brazil) Caroline Gattaz | Middle Blocker | 1.95 | July 27, 1981 (age 44) |
| 13 | (Brazil) Isabelle Venâncio | Middle Blocker | 1.82 | August 29, 2004 (age 21) |
| 14 | (United States) Payton Caffrey | Outside Hitter | 1.81 | September 1, 1998 (age 27) |
| 15 | (Brazil) Monique Pavão | Opposite | 1.79 | October 31, 1986 (age 39) |
| 16 | (Brazil) Priscila Souza | Outside Hitter | 1.84 | October 29, 1987 (age 38) |
| 17 | (Brazil) Suelen Pinto | Libero | 1.68 | October 4, 1987 (age 38) |
| 18 | (Brazil) Milka Marcília | Middle Blocker | 1.92 | May 2, 1992 (age 34) |
| 20 | (Brazil) Milla Barbosa | Setter | 1.76 | July 18, 1994 (age 31) |

Team roster - season 2020–2021
| Number | Player | Position | Height (m) | Birth date |
|---|---|---|---|---|
| 1 | (Brazil) Walewska Oliveira | Middle blocker | 1.90 | October 1, 1979 (age 46) |
| 2 | (Dominican Republic) Brayelin Martinez | Outside spiker | 2.01 | September 11, 1996 (age 29) |
| 3 | (Dominican Republic) Jineiry Martínez | Middle Blocker | 1.90 | December 3, 1997 (age 28) |
| 4 | (Brazil) Claudia Silva | Setter | 1.81 | September 21, 1987 (age 38) |
| 7 | (Brazil) Mariana Costa | Outside spiker | 1.80 | June 30, 1986 (age 39) |
| 9 | (Brazil) Angélica Malinverno | Middle blocker | 1.89 | July 5, 1989 (age 36) |
| 10 | (Brazil) Michelle Pavão | Outside spiker | 1.78 | October 31, 1986 (age 39) |
| 11 | (Netherlands) Anne Buijs | Outside spiker | 1.91 | December 2, 1991 (age 34) |
| 12 | (Brazil) Laís Vasques | Libero | 1.72 | February 12, 1996 (age 30) |
| 15 | (Brazil) Ana Carolina da Silva | Middle blocker | 1.83 | April 8, 1991 (age 35) |
| 16 | (Brazil) Fernanda Garay | Outside spiker | 1.79 | May 10, 1986 (age 39) |
| 17 | (Brazil) Suelen Pinto | Libero | 1.68 | October 4, 1987 (age 38) |
| 19 | (Brazil) Lyara Medeiros | Setter | 1.84 | September 19, 1996 (age 29) |
| 20 | (Brazil) Monique Pavão | Opposite | 1.78 | October 31, 1986 (age 39) |

Team roster - season 2019–2020
| Number | Player | Position | Height (m) | Birth date |
|---|---|---|---|---|
| 1 | (Brazil) Walewska Oliveira | Middle blocker | 1.90 | October 1, 1979 (age 46) |
| 2 | (Dominican Republic) Brayelin Martinez | Outside spiker | 2.01 | September 11, 1996 (age 29) |
| 4 | (Brazil) Claudia Silva | Setter | 1.81 | September 21, 1987 (age 38) |
| 5 | (Brazil) Priscila Daroit | Outside spiker | 1.82 | August 10, 1988 (age 37) |
| 9 | (Brazil) Angélica Malinverno | Middle blocker | 1.89 | July 5, 1989 (age 36) |
| 10 | (Brazil) Michelle Pavão | Outside spiker | 1.78 | October 31, 1986 (age 39) |
| 11 | (United States) Nicole Fawcett | Opposite | 1.91 | December 16, 1986 (age 39) |
| 12 | (Brazil) Laís Vasques | Libero | 1.72 | February 12, 1996 (age 30) |
| 13 | (Brazil) Francynne Jacintho | Middle blocker | 1.90 | July 16, 1992 (age 33) |
| 14 | (Brazil) Ananda Marinho | Setter | 1.77 | May 2, 1989 (age 37) |
| 15 | (Brazil) Ana Carolina da Silva | Middle blocker | 1.83 | April 8, 1991 (age 35) |
| 16 | (Brazil) Fernanda Garay | Outside spiker | 1.79 | May 10, 1986 (age 39) |
| 17 | (Brazil) Suelen Pinto | Libero | 1.68 | October 4, 1987 (age 38) |
| 19 | (Brazil) Vivian Lima | Setter | 1.81 | October 14, 1999 (age 26) |
| 20 | (Brazil) Monique Pavão | Opposite | 1.78 | October 31, 1986 (age 39) |

Team roster - season 2018–2019
| Number | Player | Position | Height (m) | Birth date |
|---|---|---|---|---|
| 1 | (Brazil) Fabiana Claudino | Middle Blocker | 1.93 | January 24, 1985 (age 41) |
| 3 | (United States) Carli Lloyd | Setter | 1.80 | August 6, 1989 (age 36) |
| 7 | (Brazil) Ellen Braga | Outside Hitter | 1.79 | June 12, 1991 (age 34) |
| 8 | (Brazil) Ana Paula Borgo | Opposite | 1.87 | October 20, 1993 (age 32) |
| 9 | (Brazil) Rosamaria Montibeller | Outside Hitter | 1.85 | April 9, 1994 (age 32) |
| 10 | (Brazil) Michelle Pavão | Outside Hitter | 1.78 | October 31, 1986 (age 39) |
| 11 | (United States) Nicole Fawcett | Opposite | 1.91 | December 16, 1986 (age 39) |
| 12 | (Brazil) Laís Vasques | Libero | 1.72 | February 12, 1996 (age 30) |
| 13 | (Brazil) Francynne Jacintho | Middle Blocker | 1.90 | July 16, 1992 (age 33) |
| 14 | (Brazil) Ananda Marinho | Setter | 1.77 | May 2, 1989 (age 37) |
| 15 | (Brazil) Ana Carolina da Silva | Middle Blocker | 1.83 | April 8, 1991 (age 35) |
| 16 | (Brazil) Fernanda Garay | Outside Hitter | 1.79 | May 10, 1986 (age 39) |
| 17 | (Brazil) Suelen Pinto | Libero | 1.68 | October 4, 1987 (age 38) |
| 18 | (Brazil) Gabriella Rocha Silva | Middle Blocker | 1.88 | May 15, 1997 (age 28) |

Team roster - season 2017–2018
| Number | Player | Position | Height (m) | Birth date |
|---|---|---|---|---|
| 1 | (Brazil) Walewska Oliveira | Middle Blocker | 1.90 | October 1, 1979 (age 46) |
| 2 | (Brazil) Fabiana Claudino | Middle Blocker | 1.93 | January 24, 1985 (age 41) |
| 4 | (Brazil) Claudia Silva | Setter | 1.81 | September 21, 1987 (age 38) |
| 6 | (Brazil) Andréia Laurence | Opposite | 1.86 | April 26, 1983 (age 43) |
| 7 | (Brazil) Ellen Braga | Outside Hitter | 1.79 | June 12, 1991 (age 34) |
| 10 | (Brazil) Amanda Francisco | Outside Hitter | 1.80 | August 16, 1988 (age 37) |
| 11 | (United States) Nicole Fawcett | Opposite | 1.91 | December 16, 1986 (age 39) |
| 12 | (Brazil) Laís Vasques | Libero | 1.72 | February 12, 1996 (age 30) |
| 13 | (Brazil) Cala Santos | Outside Hitter | 1.73 | January 17, 1992 (age 34) |
| 14 | (Brazil) Ananda Marinho | Setter | 1.77 | May 2, 1989 (age 37) |
| 15 | (Brazil) Natasha Farinea | Middle Blocker | 1.88 | February 8, 1986 (age 40) |
| 16 | (Brazil) Fernanda Garay | Outside Hitter | 1.79 | May 10, 1986 (age 39) |
| 17 | (Brazil) Suelen Pinto | Libero | 1.68 | October 4, 1987 (age 38) |
| 18 | (Brazil) Bruna Araújo | Middle Blocker | 1.83 | April 24, 2000 (age 26) |

Team roster - season 2016–2017
| Number | Player | Position | Height (m) | Birth date |
|---|---|---|---|---|
| 1 | (Brazil) Walewska Oliveira | Middle Blocker | 1.90 | October 1, 1979 (age 46) |
| 2 | (Brazil) Fabiana Claudino | Middle Blocker | 1.93 | January 24, 1985 (age 41) |
| 4 | (Brazil) Claudia Silva | Setter | 1.81 | September 21, 1987 (age 38) |
| 5 | (Brazil) Luana Almeida | Libero | 1.75 | February 20, 1999 (age 27) |
| 6 | (Cuba) Daymi Ramirez | Opposite | 1.76 | October 8, 1983 (age 42) |
| 7 | (Brazil) Ellen Braga | Outside Hitter | 1.79 | June 12, 1991 (age 34) |
| 8 | (Brazil) Juliana Carrijo | Setter | 1.76 | February 25, 1992 (age 34) |
| 9 | (Brazil) Tássia Silva | Libero | 1.72 | June 3, 1988 (age 37) |
| 10 | (United States) Alexandra Klineman | Outside Hitter | 1.95 | December 30, 1989 (age 36) |
| 11 | (Brazil) Mariana Golon | Setter | 1.74 | February 25, 1994 (age 32) |
| 12 | (Brazil) Maria Luisa Oliveira | Opposite | 1.82 | December 12, 1992 (age 33) |
| 13 | (Brazil) Cala Santos | Outside Hitter | 1.73 | January 17, 1992 (age 34) |
| 15 | (Brazil) Natasha Farinea | Middle Blocker | 1.88 | February 8, 1986 (age 40) |
| 16 | (Brazil) Michelle Pavão | Outside Hitter | 1.78 | October 31, 1986 (age 39) |
| 18 | (Brazil) Ednéia de Souza | Middle Blocker | 1.89 | September 12, 1980 (age 45) |
| 20 | (Brazil) Bruna Araújo | Middle Blocker | 1.83 | April 24, 2000 (age 26) |

== Men's team ==
=== Titles and honours ===
==== International ====
- South American Championship: 2024–25 Runners-up

==== National ====
- Superliga Brasileira Série A: 2024–25 Third place

==== Regional ====
- Minas Gerais State Championship: 2024–25 Third place
