= Brazil women's national volleyball team =

Women's national volleyball team representing Brazil

Brazil
- Nickname(s): Canarinhas
- Association: CBV
- Confederation: CSV
- Head coach: Zé Roberto
- FIVB ranking: 2 (2 October 2026)

Uniforms
Home	Away	Third

Summer Olympics
- Appearances: 12 (First in 1980)
- Best result: Gold : (2008, 2012)

World Championship
- Appearances: 18 (First in 1956)
- Best result: Silver : (1994, 2006, 2010, 2022)

World Cup
- Appearances: 12 (First in 1973)
- Best result: Silver : (1995, 2003, 2007)
- www.cbv.com.br (in Portuguese)
Honours
Event	1st	2nd	3rd
Summer Olympics	2	1	3
World Championship	0	4	2
World Cup	0	3	1
World Grand Champions Cup	2	2	1
World Grand Prix	12	5	2
Nations League	0	5	0
Pan American Games	4	4	2
Pan-American Cup	3	3	1
South American Championship	24	11	0
Total	47	38	12
Medal record
Summer Olympics
Gold medal – first place	2008 Beijing	Team
Gold medal – first place	2012 London	Team
Silver medal – second place	2020 Tokyo	Team
Bronze medal – third place	1996 Atlanta	Team
Bronze medal – third place	2000 Sydney	Team
Bronze medal – third place	2024 Paris	Team
World Championship
Silver medal – second place	1994 Brazil	
Silver medal – second place	2006 Japan	
Silver medal – second place	2010 Japan	
Silver medal – second place	2022 Netherlands/Poland	
Bronze medal – third place	2014 Italy	
Bronze medal – third place	2025 Thailand	
World Cup
Silver medal – second place	1995 Japan	
Silver medal – second place	2003 Japan	
Silver medal – second place	2007 Japan	
Bronze medal – third place	1999 Japan	
World Grand Champions Cup
Gold medal – first place	2005 Japan	
Gold medal – first place	2013 Japan	
Silver medal – second place	2009 Japan	
Silver medal – second place	2017 Japan	
Bronze medal – third place	1997 Japan	
Nations League
Silver medal – second place	2019 Nanjing	
Silver medal – second place	2021 Rimini	
Silver medal – second place	2022 Ankara	
Silver medal – second place	2025 Łódź	
Silver medal – second place	2026 Macao	
World Grand Prix
Gold medal – first place	1994 Shanghai	
Gold medal – first place	1996 Shanghai	
Gold medal – first place	1998 Hong Kong	
Gold medal – first place	2004 Reggio Calabria	
Gold medal – first place	2005 Sendai	
Gold medal – first place	2006 Reggio Calabria	
Gold medal – first place	2008 Yokohama	
Gold medal – first place	2009 Tokyo	
Gold medal – first place	2013 Sapporo	
Gold medal – first place	2014 Tokyo	
Gold medal – first place	2016 Bangkok	
Gold medal – first place	2017 Nanjing	
Silver medal – second place	1995 Shanghai	
Silver medal – second place	1999 Yu Xi	
Silver medal – second place	2010 Ningbo	
Silver medal – second place	2011 Macau	
Silver medal – second place	2012 Ningbo	
Bronze medal – third place	2000 Quezon City	
Bronze medal – third place	2015 Omaha	
Pan American Games
Gold medal – first place	1959 Chicago	Team
Gold medal – first place	1963 São Paulo	Team
Gold medal – first place	1999 Winnipeg	Team
Gold medal – first place	2011 Guadalajara	Team
Silver medal – second place	1991 Havana	Team
Silver medal – second place	2007 Rio de Janeiro	Team
Silver medal – second place	2015 Toronto	Team
Silver medal – second place	2023 Santiago	Team
Bronze medal – third place	1955 Mexico City	Team
Bronze medal – third place	1979 San Juan	Team
Pan American Cup
Gold medal – first place	2006 San Juan	
Gold medal – first place	2009 Mianmi	
Gold medal – first place	2011 Ciudad Juárez	
Silver medal – second place	2007 Colima	
Silver medal – second place	2008 Tijuana/Mexicali	
Silver medal – second place	2012 Ciudad Juárez	
Bronze medal – third place	2005 Santo Domingo	
South American Championship
Gold medal – first place	1951 Rio de Janeiro	
Gold medal – first place	1956 Montevideo	
Gold medal – first place	1958 Porto Alegre	
Gold medal – first place	1961 Lima	
Gold medal – first place	1962 Santiago	
Gold medal – first place	1969 Caracas	
Gold medal – first place	1981 Santo André	
Gold medal – first place	1991 Osasco	
Gold medal – first place	1995 Porto Alegre	
Gold medal – first place	1997 Lima	
Gold medal – first place	1999 Valencia	
Gold medal – first place	2001 Morón	
Gold medal – first place	2003 Bogotá	
Gold medal – first place	2005 La Paz	
Gold medal – first place	2007 Santiago	
Gold medal – first place	2009 Porto Alegre	
Gold medal – first place	2011 Callao	
Gold medal – first place	2013 Ica	
Gold medal – first place	2015 Cartagena	
Gold medal – first place	2017 Cali	
Gold medal – first place	2019 Cajamarca	
Gold medal – first place	2021 Barrancabermeja	
Gold medal – first place	2023 Recife	
Gold medal – first place	2026 Rio de Janeiro	
Silver medal – second place	1967 Santos	
Silver medal – second place	1971 Montevideo	
Silver medal – second place	1973 Bucaramanga	
Silver medal – second place	1975 Asunción	
Silver medal – second place	1977 Lima	
Silver medal – second place	1979 Rosario	
Silver medal – second place	1983 São Paulo	
Silver medal – second place	1985 Caracas	
Silver medal – second place	1987 Punta del Este	
Silver medal – second place	1989 Curitiba	
Silver medal – second place	1993 Cusco	

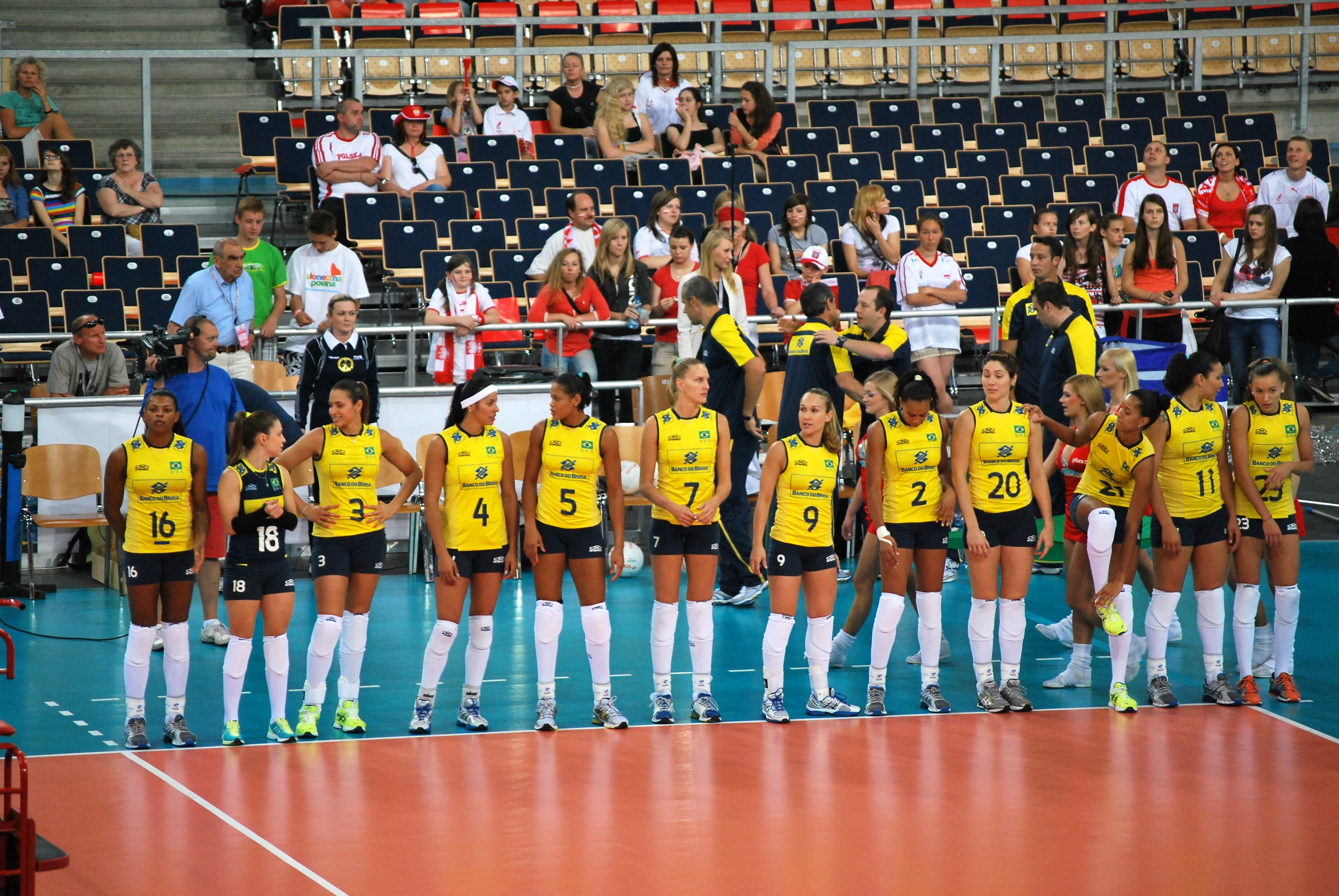
The Brazil women's national volleyball team in 2012

The Brazil women's national volleyball team is administered by the Confederação Brasileira de Voleibol (CBV) and takes part in international volleyball competitions. With a tally of 47 titles, the Brazil women's volleyball national team is one of the most successful national teams of all time. They have won 6 olympic medals including two gold medals, in the 2008 Summer Olympics and in 2012 Summer Olympics. They also hold the record of FIVB World Grand Prix championship titles having won the competition 12 times. In regional competitions they have won gold four times in the Pan American Games, and have 24 titles in the Women's South American Volleyball Championship.

The most successful coaches for Brazil are Bernardo Rezende, who led the team from 1990 to 2000, and José Roberto Guimarães, who has managed the team since 2004. Currently the team is ranked second in the FIVB World Rankings as of September 2026.

== Results ==
=== Olympic Games ===
Champions Runners up Third place Fourth place

Summer Olympics record
Year	Round	Position	GP	MW	ML	SW	SL	Squad
(Japan) 1964	did not qualify							
(Mexico) 1968	did not qualify							
(Germany) 1972	did not qualify							
(Canada) 1976	did not qualify							
(Soviet Union) 1980	5th–8th places	7th place	5	1	4	7	12	Squad
(United States) 1984	5th–8th places	7th place	5	1	4	6	12	Squad
(South Korea) 1988	5th–8th places	6th place	5	1	4	7	14	Squad
(Spain) 1992	Semifinals	4th place	6	3	3	11	10	Squad
(United States) 1996	Semifinals	Bronze	8	7	1	23	6	Squad
(Australia) 2000	Semifinals	Bronze	8	7	1	23	4	Squad
(Greece) 2004	Semifinals	4th place	8	6	2	19	10	Squad
(China) 2008	Final	Gold	8	8	0	24	1	Squad
(United Kingdom) 2012	Final	Gold	8	6	2	19	13	Squad
(Brazil) 2016	Quarterfinals	5th place	6	5	1	17	3	Squad
(Japan) 2020	Final	Silver	8	7	1	21	7	Squad
(France) 2024	Semifinals	Bronze	6	5	1	17	4	Squad
(United States) 2028	Qualified							
(Australia) 2032	to be determined							
Total	2 titles	12/18	81	57	24	194	96	—

=== World Championship ===
Champions Runners up Third place Fourth place

World Championship record
Year	Round	Position	GP	MW	ML	SW	SL	Squad
(Soviet Union) 1952	did not compete							
(France) 1956	11th–17th places	11th place	8	6	2	19	7	Squad
(Brazil) 1960	Final round	5th place	6	2	4	9	12	Squad
(Soviet Union) 1962	Final round	8th place	8	1	7	3	21	Squad
(Japan) 1967	did not compete							
(Bulgaria) 1970	9th–16th places	13th place	9	3	6	12	19	Squad
(Mexico) 1974	13th–18th places	15th place	11	6	5	21	17	Squad
(Soviet Union) 1978	5th–8th places	7th place	9	5	4	15	18	Squad
(Peru) 1982	5th–8th places	8th place	9	4	5	15	17	Squad
(Czechoslovakia) 1986	5th–8th places	5th place	8	5	3	21	8	Squad
(China) 1990	5th–8th places	7th place	6	3	3	11	10	Squad
(Brazil) 1994	Final	Runners-up	7	6	1	18	6	Squad
(Japan) 1998	Semifinals	4th place	8	5	3	17	9	Squad
(Germany) 2002	5th–8th places	7th place	11	7	4	26	13	Squad
(Japan) 2006	Final	Runners-up	11	10	1	32	9	Squad
(Japan) 2010	Final	Runners-up	11	10	1	32	8	Squad
(Italy) 2014	Semifinals	3rd place	13	12	1	30	10	Squad
(Japan) 2018	Second Round	7th place	9	7	2	23	11	Squad
(Netherlands) (Poland) 2022	Final	Runners-up	12	10	2	31	14	Squad
(Thailand) 2025	Semifinals	3rd place	7	6	1	20	8	Squad
(Canada) / (United States) 2027	Qualified							
(Philippines) 2029	to be determined							
Total	0 titles	18/22	163	108	55	355	217	—

=== World Cup ===
Champions Runners up Third place Fourth place

World Cup record
Year	Round	Position	GP	MW	ML	SW	SL	Squad
(Uruguay) 1973	Round robin	9th place	5	1	4	3	13	Squad
(Japan) 1977	did not compete							
(Japan) 1981	Round robin	8th place	7	0	7	1	21	Squad
(Japan) 1985	Round robin	6th place	7	2	5	9	17	Squad
(Japan) 1989	did not compete							
(Japan) 1991	Round robin	8th place	8	4	4	17	12	Squad
(Japan) 1995	Round robin	Runners-up	11	10	1	30	4	Squad
(Japan) 1999	Round robin	3rd place	11	9	2	29	8	Squad
(Japan) 2003	Round robin	Runners-up	11	10	1	31	7	Squad
(Japan) 2007	Round robin	Runners-up	11	9	2	29	9	Squad
(Japan) 2011	Round robin	5th place	11	8	3	25	16	Squad
(Japan) 2015	did not compete							
(Japan) 2019	Round robin	4th place	11	7	4	24	16	Squad
Total	0 titles	10/13	93	60	33	198	123	—

=== World Grand Champions Cup ===
Champions Runners up Third place Fourth place

World Grand Champions record
Year	Round	Position	GP	MW	ML	SW	SL	Squad
(Japan) 1993	did not qualify							
(Japan) 1997	Round robin	3rd place	5	3	2	12	6	Squad
(Japan) 2001	Round robin	4th place	5	2	3	9	11	Squad
(Japan) 2005	Round robin	Champions	5	5	0	15	2	Squad
(Japan) 2009	Round robin	Runners-up	5	4	1	12	4	Squad
(Japan) 2013	Round robin	Champions	5	5	0	15	2	Squad
(Japan) 2017	Round robin	Runners-up	5	3	2	13	7	Squad
Total	2 titles	6/7	30	22	8	76	32	—

=== World Grand Prix ===
Champions Runners up Third place Fourth place

World Grand Prix record
Year	Round	Position	GP	MW	ML	SW	SL	Squad
(Hong Kong) 1993	Final round	4th place	12	8	4	27	19	Squad
(China) 1994	Final round	Champions	12	10	2	34	12	Squad
(China) 1995	Final round	Runners-up	15	10	5	39	22	Squad
(China) 1996	Final round	Champions	15	12	3	39	22	Squad
(Japan) 1997	did not enter							
(Hong Kong) 1998	Final	Champions	11	8	3	28	13	Squad
(China) 1999	Final	Runners-up	8	7	1	21	9	Squad
(Philippines) 2000	Semifinals	3rd place	11	8	3	26	12	Squad
(Macau) 2001	Final round	5th place	12	7	5	27	24	Squad
(Hong Kong) 2002	Final round	4th place	12	6	6	22	21	Squad
(Italy) 2003	Preliminary round	7th place	5	3	2	11	7	Squad
(Italy) 2004	Final	Champions	13	12	1	38	10	Squad
(Japan) 2005	Final round	Champions	14	12	2	36	12	Squad
(Italy) 2006	Final	Champions	13	13	0	39	6	Squad
(China) 2007	Final round	5th place	14	9	5	33	17	Squad
(Japan) 2008	Final round	Champions	14	13	1	41	7	Squad
(Japan) 2009	Final round	Champions	14	14	0	42	11	Squad
(China) 2010	Final round	Runners-up	14	11	3	38	11	Squad
(Macau) 2011	Final round	Runners-up	14	13	1	39	6	Squad
(China) 2012	Final	Runners-up	14	11	3	36	15	Squad
(Japan) 2013	Final round	Champions	14	13	1	40	8	Squad
(Japan) 2014	Final round	Champions	14	13	1	41	6	Squad
(United States) 2015	Final round	3rd place	14	12	2	36	10	Squad
(Thailand) 2016	Final	Champions	13	11	2	35	12	Squad
(China) 2017	Final	Champions	13	9	4	29	21	Squad
Total	12 titles	24/25	305	245	60	797	313	—

=== Nations League ===
Champions Runners up Third place Fourth place

Nations League record
Year	Round	Position	GP	MW	ML	SW	SL	Squad
(China) 2018	Semifinals	4th place	19	14	5	46	26	Squad
(China) 2019	Final	Runners-up	19	13	6	49	24	Squad
(Italy) 2021	Final	Runners-up	17	14	3	46	14	Squad
(Turkey) 2022	Final	Runners-up	15	12	3	37	17	Squad
(United States) 2023	Quarterfinals	5th place	13	8	5	29	21	Squad
(Thailand) 2024	Semifinals	4th place	15	13	2	43	15	Squad
(Poland) 2025	Final	Runners-up	15	13	2	40	16	Squad
(Macau) 2026	Final	Runners-up	15	11	4	36	24	Squad
(N/A) 2027	qualified							
Total	0 titles	9/9	128	98	30	326	157	—

=== Pan American Games ===
Champions Runners up Third place Fourth place

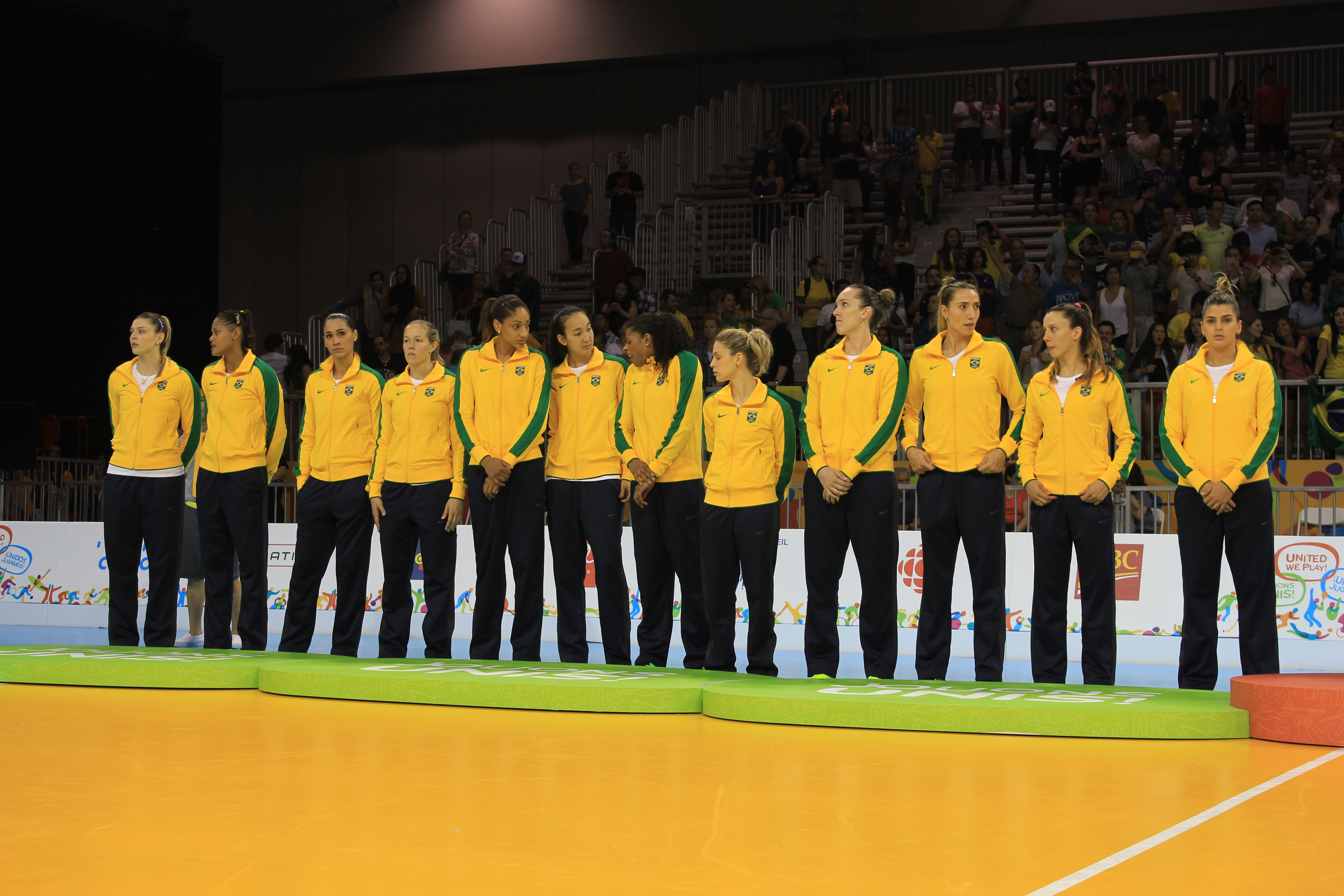
National team Toronto 2015

Pan American Games record
Year	Round	Position	GP	MW	ML	SW	SL	Squad
(Mexico) 1955	Double round robin	Bronze	6	2	4	14	13	
(United States) 1959	Double round robin	Gold	6	6	0	18	2	
(Brazil) 1963	Double round robin	Gold	4	4	0	12	2	
(Canada) 1967	Round robin	4th place	5	2	3	9	10	
(Colombia) 1971	Round robin	4th place	8	6	2	20	9	
(Mexico) 1975	Round robin	5th place	6	2	4	9	12	
(Puerto Rico) 1979	Final round	Bronze	7	4	3	13	13	
(Venezuela) 1983	Semifinals	4th place	8	3	5	12	16	
(United States) 1987	Semifinals	4th place	6	2	4	7	13	
(Cuba) 1991	Final	Silver	7	4	3	11	11	Squad
(Argentina) 1995	Group round	6th place	6	0	6	1	18	Squad
(Canada) 1999	Final	Gold	7	7	0	21	4	Squad
(Dominican Republic) 2003	Semifinals	4th place	5	2	3	11	10	Squad
(Brazil) 2007	Final	Silver	5	4	1	14	3	Squad
(Mexico) 2011	Final	Gold	5	5	0	15	4	Squad
(Canada) 2015	Final	Silver	5	4	1	12	10	Squad
(Peru) 2019	Semifinals	4th place	5	2	3	8	9	Squad
(Chile) 2023	Final	Silver	5	4	1	12	5	Squad
(Peru) 2027	to be determined							
Total	4 titles	18/18	106	63	43	219	164	—

=== Pan-American Cup ===
Champions Runners up Third place Fourth place

Pan-American Cup record
Year	Round	Position	GP	MW	ML	SW	SL	Squad
(Mexico) 2002	did not compete							
(Mexico) 2003	Semifinals	4th place	6	3	3	10	9	Squad
(Mexico) 2004	Semifinals	4th place	6	3	3	12	10	Squad
(Dominican Republic) 2005	Semifinals	3rd place	7	5	2	17	10	Squad
(Puerto Rico) 2006	Final	Champions	7	6	1	20	6	Squad
(Mexico) 2007	Final	Runners-up	7	5	2	15	7	Squad
(Mexico) 2008	Final	Runners-up	7	6	1	20	4	Squad
(United States) 2009	Final	Champions	6	5	1	17	5	Squad
(Mexico) 2010	Group round	8th place	7	2	5	11	15	Squad
(Mexico) 2011	Final	Champions	7	7	0	21	3	Squad
(Mexico) 2012	Final	Runners-up	7	6	1	20	4	Squad
(Peru) 2013	Semifinals	4th place	6	3	3	10	12	Squad
(Mexico) 2014	withdrew							
(Peru) 2015	Group round	7th place	7	4	3	18	9	Squad
(Dominican Republic) 2016	did not compete							
(Peru) 2017	did not compete							
(Dominican Republic) 2018	Semifinals	4th place	5	3	2	9	10	Squad
Total	3 titles	13/18	85	58	27	200	104	—

=== South America Championship ===
Champions Runners up Third place Fourth place

South America Championship record
Year	Round	Position	GP	MW	ML	SW	SL	Squad
(Brazil) 1951	Round robin	Champions	3	3	0	6	1	
(Uruguay) 1956	Round robin	Champions	3	3	0	6	1	
(Brazil) 1958	Round robin	Champions	4	4	0	12	0	
(Peru) 1961	Double round robin	Champions	6	6	0	18	1	
(Chile) 1962	Round robin	Champions	3	3	0	9	0	
(Argentina) 1964	did not compete							
(Brazil) 1967	Round robin	Runners-up	4	3	1	10	3	
(Venezuela) 1969	Round robin	Champions	5	5	0	15	2	
(Uruguay) 1971	Round robin	Runners-up	7	6	1	18	3	
(Colombia) 1973	Round robin	Runners-up	6	5	1	15	3	
(Paraguay) 1975	Round robin	Runners-up	5	4	1	12	4	
(Peru) 1977	Round robin	Runners-up	7	6	1	18	4	
(Argentina) 1979	Final round	Runners-up	5	4	1	13	3	
(Brazil) 1981	Round robin	Champions	5	5	0	15	2	
(Brazil) 1983	Round robin	Runners-up	5	4	1	12	3	
(Venezuela) 1985	Double round robin	Runners-up	6	4	2	14	6	
(Uruguay) 1987	Round robin	Runners-up	6	5	1	15	3	
(Brazil) 1989	Round robin	Runners-up	5	4	1	12	4	
(Brazil) 1991	Final	Champions	4	4	0	12	1	
(Peru) 1993	Final	Runners-up	6	4	2	13	6	
(Brazil) 1995	Final	Champions	4	4	0	12	0	
(Peru) 1997	Final	Champions	4	4	0	12	0	
(Venezuela) 1999	Final	Champions	4	4	0	12	2	
(Argentina) 2001	Final	Champions	4	4	0	12	0	
(Colombia) 2003	Final round	Champions	3	3	0	9	0	
(Bolivia) 2005	Round robin	Champions	6	6	0	18	0	
(Chile) 2007	Final	Champions	5	5	0	15	0	
(Brazil) 2009	Final	Champions	5	5	0	15	0	
(Peru) 2011	Final	Champions	5	5	0	15	0	
(Peru) 2013	Round robin	Champions	5	5	0	15	0	
(Colombia) 2015	Final	Champions	5	5	0	15	0	
(Colombia) 2017	Round robin	Champions	5	5	0	15	0	
(Peru) 2019	Final	Champions	5	5	0	15	1	
(Colombia) 2021	Round robin	Champions	4	3	1	10	4	
(Brazil) 2023	Round robin	Champions	4	4	0	12	0	
(Brazil) 2026	Round robin	Champions	5	5	0	15	0	
Total	24 titles	35/36	168	154	14	462	57	—

=== U23 team ===
==== World Championship ====
- Gold: 2015

==== South America Championship ====
- Gold: 2014, 2016

=== U20 team ===
==== World Championship ====
- Gold: 1987, 1989, 2001, 2003, 2005, 2007
- Silver: 1991, 1995, 1999, 2011, 2015
- Bronze: 2009, 2013

==== South America Championship ====
- Gold: 1972, 1974, 1976, 1978, 1984, 1990, 1992, 1994, 1996, 1998, 2000, 2002, 2004, 2006, 2008, 2010, 2012, 2014, 2016
- Silver: 1980, 1982, 1986, 1988

=== U18 team ===
==== World Championship ====
- Gold: 1997, 2005, 2009
- Silver: 1989, 1991, 1999, 2001
- Bronze: 2003, 2013

==== South America Championship ====
- Gold: 1982, 1984, 1986, 1988, 1990, 1992, 1994, 1998, 2000, 2002, 2004, 2006, 2008, 2010, 2014, 2016
- Silver: 1978, 1980, 1996, 2012

=== U16 team ===
==== South America Championship ====
- Gold: 2011, 2013

== Team ==
=== Current squad ===
Roster for the 2025 FIVB Women's Volleyball World Championship.

- Head coach: Zé Roberto

No.	Name	Position	Age	Height	Club
3	Macris Carneiro	Setter	35	1,77 m	(Brazil) Praia Clube
9	Roberta Ratzke	Setter	36	1,85 m	(Turkey) Türk Hava Yolları SK
2	Diana Duarte	Middle Blocker	26	1,94 m	(Brazil) Sesi Vôlei Bauru
4	Lorena Viezel	Middle Blocker	26	1,90 m	(Brazil) Sesc/Flamengo
8	Julia Kudiess	Middle Blocker	22	1,92 m	(Brazil) Minas Tênis Clube
11	Luzia Nezzo	Middle Blocker	22	1,99 m	(Brazil) Paulistano/Barueri
10	Gabi Guimarães (C)	Outside Hitter	32	1,80 m	(Italy) Imoco Conegliano
15	Helena Wenk	Outside Hitter	20	1,99 m	(Brazil) Sesc/Flamengo
17	Júlia Bergmann	Outside Hitter	25	1,91 m	(Turkey) Türk Hava Yolları SK
7	Rosamaria Montibeller	Opposite	31	1,85 m	(Japan) Denso Airybees
16	Kisy Nascimento	Opposite	25	1,90 m	(Russia) Lokomotiv Kaliningrad
19	Tainara Santos	Opposite	26	1,90 m	(Brazil) Sesc/Flamengo
22	Laís Vasques	Libero	30	1,74 m	(Brazil) Sesc/Flamengo
30	Marcelle Arruda	Libero	23	1,68 m	(Brazil) Fluminense

=== Notable players ===
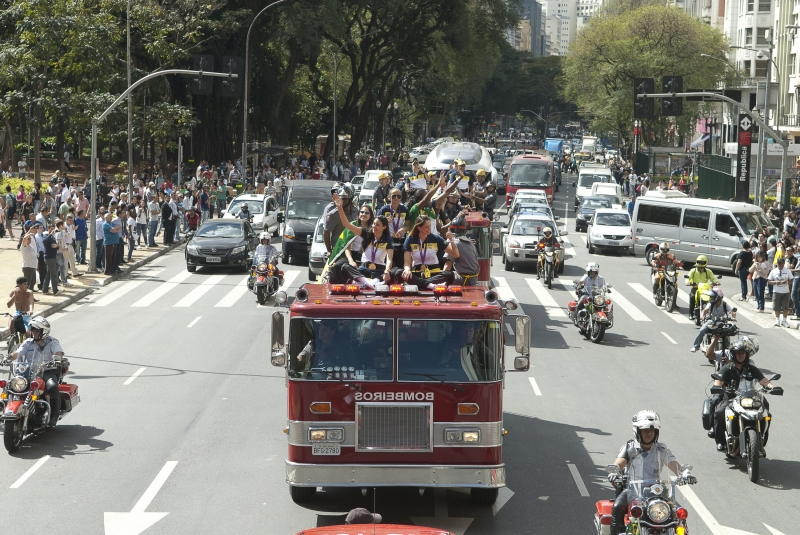
Brazil team gold medal winner in London 2012 Olympics

- Ana Beatriz Moser
- Ana Margarida Alvares (Ida)
- Ana Paula Connelly
- Ana Paula Lima
- Andrea Moraes
- Andreia Marras
- Camila Brait
- Caroline Gattaz
- Danielle Lins
- Edna Veiga
- Erika Coimbra
- Estefania Souza
- Fabiana Berto
- Fabiana Claudino
- Fabiana Oliveira
- Fernanda Doval
- Fernanda Garay
- Fernanda Venturini
- Gabriela Guimarães
- Hélia Souza (Fofão)
- Hilma Caldeira
- Jackie Silva
- Jaqueline Carvalho
- Janina Conceiçao
- Leila Barros
- Marcia Cunha (Marcia Fu)
- Maria Isabel Alencar
- Marianne Steinbrecher
- Natália Pereira
- Paula Pequeno
- Sheilla Castro
- Tandara Caixeta
- Thaisa Menezes
- Vera Mossa
- Virna Dias
- Walewska Oliveira
- Welissa Gonzaga (Sassá)

== See also ==
- Brazil men's national volleyball team
- Brazil women's national under-23 volleyball team
- Brazil women's national under-20 volleyball team
- Brazil women's national under-18 volleyball team
