= 2019 FIVB Volleyball Women's Club World Championship squads =

This article shows the rosters of all participating teams at the 2019 FIVB Volleyball Women's Club World Championship in Shaoxing, China.

== Pool A ==
=== Eczacıbaşı VitrA İstanbul ===
The following is the roster of the Turkish club Eczacıbaşı VitrA İstanbul in the 2019 FIVB Volleyball Women's Club World Championship.

- Head coach: (Brazil) Marco Aurélio Motta

No.	Name	Date of birth	Height	Weight	Spike	Block
2	(Turkey) Buse Melis Kara (L)	30 August 1998	1.77 m (5 ft 10 in)	75 kg (165 lb)	286 cm (113 in)	271 cm (107 in)
3	(Serbia) Tijana Bošković	8 March 1997	1.93 m (6 ft 4 in)	82 kg (181 lb)	315 cm (124 in)	300 cm (120 in)
4	(Turkey) Beyza Arıcı	27 July 1995	1.93 m (6 ft 4 in)	83 kg (183 lb)	303 cm (119 in)	294 cm (116 in)
5	(Turkey) Simge Şebnem Aköz (L)	23 April 1991	1.68 m (5 ft 6 in)	55 kg (121 lb)	260 cm (100 in)	255 cm (100 in)
6	(United States) Lauren Gibbemeyer	8 September 1988	1.87 m (6 ft 2 in)	71 kg (157 lb)	307 cm (121 in)	293 cm (115 in)
7	(Turkey) Hande Baladın	1 September 1997	1.90 m (6 ft 3 in)	81 kg (179 lb)	309 cm (122 in)	300 cm (120 in)
8	(Turkey) Yasemin Güveli	5 January 1999	1.88 m (6 ft 2 in)	72 kg (159 lb)	306 cm (120 in)	298 cm (117 in)
10	(South Korea) Kim Yeon-koung (C)	26 February 1988	1.92 m (6 ft 4 in)	73 kg (161 lb)	330 cm (130 in)	320 cm (130 in)
11	(Turkey) Gamze Alikaya	1 January 1993	1.79 m (5 ft 10 in)	62 kg (137 lb)	295 cm (116 in)	290 cm (110 in)
12	(Brazil) Natália Pereira	4 April 1989	1.86 m (6 ft 1 in)	83 kg (183 lb)	311 cm (122 in)	295 cm (116 in)
13	(United States) Carli Lloyd	6 August 1989	1.80 m (5 ft 11 in)	75 kg (165 lb)	313 cm (123 in)	295 cm (116 in)
14	(Turkey) Melis Durul	21 October 1993	1.85 m (6 ft 1 in)	74 kg (163 lb)	303 cm (119 in)	291 cm (115 in)
15	(Turkey) Ergül Avcı	24 July 1987	1.90 m (6 ft 3 in)	75 kg (165 lb)	300 cm (120 in)	285 cm (112 in)
16	(Turkey) Saliha Şahin	5 November 1998	1.85 m (6 ft 1 in)	62 kg (137 lb)	282 cm (111 in)	275 cm (108 in)

=== Guangdong Evergrande VC ===
The following is the roster of the Chinese club Guangdong Evergrande VC in the 2019 FIVB Volleyball Women's Club World Championship.

- Head coach: (China) Fang Yan

No.	Name	Date of birth	Height	Weight	Spike	Block
1	(China) Chen Peiyan	16 September 1999	1.93 m (6 ft 4 in)	79 kg (174 lb)	318 cm (125 in)	309 cm (122 in)
2	(China) Li Yao (C)	23 October 1995	1.86 m (6 ft 1 in)	75 kg (165 lb)	310 cm (120 in)	300 cm (120 in)
4	(China) Lin Li (L)	5 July 1992	1.71 m (5 ft 7 in)	65 kg (143 lb)	294 cm (116 in)	294 cm (116 in)
5	(Bulgaria) Dobriana Rabadzhieva	14 June 1991	1.90 m (6 ft 3 in)	77 kg (170 lb)	305 cm (120 in)	285 cm (112 in)
6	(China) Yu Jiarui	23 October 1997	1.80 m (5 ft 11 in)	74 kg (163 lb)	295 cm (116 in)	290 cm (110 in)
7	(China) Xu Xiaoting	21 January 1998	1.83 m (6 ft 0 in)	72 kg (159 lb)	308 cm (121 in)	300 cm (120 in)
9	(China) Du Qingqing	18 December 1996	1.89 m (6 ft 2 in)	72 kg (159 lb)	312 cm (123 in)	300 cm (120 in)
10	(China) Wang Min (L)	14 May 1997	1.77 m (5 ft 10 in)	70 kg (150 lb)	285 cm (112 in)	280 cm (110 in)
13	(China) Yang Hanyu	12 October 1999	1.92 m (6 ft 4 in)	75 kg (165 lb)	305 cm (120 in)	295 cm (116 in)
14	(China) Zheng Yixin	6 May 1995	1.87 m (6 ft 2 in)	71 kg (157 lb)	316 cm (124 in)	307 cm (121 in)
15	(Russia) Tatiana Kosheleva	23 December 1988	1.91 m (6 ft 3 in)	67 kg (148 lb)	315 cm (124 in)	305 cm (120 in)
16	(China) Cao Tingting	10 May 1997	1.90 m (6 ft 3 in)	68 kg (150 lb)	312 cm (123 in)	305 cm (120 in)
17	(China) Mei Xiaohan	14 February 1997	1.84 m (6 ft 0 in)	75 kg (165 lb)	305 cm (120 in)	296 cm (117 in)
18	(China) Zhang Fengmei	11 November 1997	1.83 m (6 ft 0 in)	69 kg (152 lb)	300 cm (120 in)	298 cm (117 in)

=== Imoco Volley Conegliano ===
The following is the roster of the Italian club Imoco Volley Conegliano in the 2019 FIVB Volleyball Women's Club World Championship.

- Head coach: (Italy) Daniele Santarelli

No.	Name	Date of birth	Height	Weight	Spike	Block
1	(Italy) Indre Sorokaite	7 February 1988	1.88 m (6 ft 2 in)	80 kg (180 lb)	0 cm (0 in)	0 cm (0 in)
5	(Netherlands) Robin de Kruijf	5 May 1991	1.92 m (6 ft 4 in)	81 kg (179 lb)	313 cm (123 in)	300 cm (120 in)
6	(Germany) Jennifer Geerties	5 April 1994	1.84 m (6 ft 0 in)	58 kg (128 lb)	298 cm (117 in)	288 cm (113 in)
7	(Italy) Raphaela Folie	7 March 1991	1.87 m (6 ft 2 in)	73 kg (161 lb)	324 cm (128 in)	300 cm (120 in)
8	(Italy) Eleonora Fersino (L)	24 January 2000	1.72 m (5 ft 8 in)	62 kg (137 lb)	0 cm (0 in)	0 cm (0 in)
9	(Italy) Alexandra Botezat	3 August 1998	1.97 m (6 ft 6 in)	75 kg (165 lb)	316 cm (124 in)	304 cm (120 in)
10	(Italy) Monica De Gennaro (L)	8 January 1987	1.74 m (5 ft 9 in)	67 kg (148 lb)	292 cm (115 in)	217 cm (85 in)
11	(United States) Chiaka Ogbogu	15 April 1995	1.88 m (6 ft 2 in)	73 kg (161 lb)	318 cm (125 in)	307 cm (121 in)
12	(Italy) Terry Enweonwu	12 May 2000	1.87 m (6 ft 2 in)	86 kg (190 lb)	339 cm (133 in)	309 cm (122 in)
13	(Italy) Giulia Gennari	23 June 1996	1.84 m (6 ft 0 in)	72 kg (159 lb)	293 cm (115 in)	282 cm (111 in)
14	(Poland) Joanna Wołosz (C)	7 April 1990	1.81 m (5 ft 11 in)	71 kg (157 lb)	303 cm (119 in)	281 cm (111 in)
15	(United States) Kimberly Hill	30 November 1989	1.93 m (6 ft 4 in)	72 kg (159 lb)	320 cm (130 in)	310 cm (120 in)
17	(Italy) Miriam Sylla	8 January 1995	1.84 m (6 ft 0 in)	80 kg (180 lb)	320 cm (130 in)	240 cm (94 in)
18	(Italy) Paola Egonu	18 December 1998	1.93 m (6 ft 4 in)	80 kg (180 lb)	344 cm (135 in)	321 cm (126 in)

=== Itambé Minas ===
The following is the roster of the Brazilian club Itambé Minas in the 2019 FIVB Volleyball Women's Club World Championship.

- Head coach: (Italy) Nicola Negro

No.	Name	Date of birth	Height	Weight	Spike	Block
2	(Brazil) Carol Gattaz (C)	27 July 1981	1.92 m (6 ft 4 in)	78 kg (172 lb)	315 cm (124 in)	299 cm (118 in)
3	(Brazil) Macris Carneiro	3 March 1989	1.78 m (5 ft 10 in)	64 kg (141 lb)	292 cm (115 in)	275 cm (108 in)
5	(Brazil) Laura Gambatto Kudiess	25 February 2001	1.88 m (6 ft 2 in)	72 kg (159 lb)	300 cm (120 in)	286 cm (113 in)
6	(Brazil) Thaísa Menezes	15 May 1987	1.96 m (6 ft 5 in)	79 kg (174 lb)	316 cm (124 in)	301 cm (119 in)
7	(Brazil) Vivian Maria Pellegrino	31 May 1985	1.80 m (5 ft 11 in)	72 kg (159 lb)	298 cm (117 in)	294 cm (116 in)
8	(Brazil) Lana Conceição	8 December 1996	1.78 m (5 ft 10 in)	74 kg (163 lb)	305 cm (120 in)	288 cm (113 in)
9	(Brazil) Bruna da Silva	3 July 1989	1.81 m (5 ft 11 in)	79 kg (174 lb)	310 cm (120 in)	292 cm (115 in)
11	(Brazil) Luanna Emiliano (L)	26 September 2002	1.69 m (5 ft 7 in)	65 kg (143 lb)	279 cm (110 in)	275 cm (108 in)
12	(Brazil) Bruna Costa	30 January 1995	1.70 m (5 ft 7 in)	70 kg (150 lb)	282 cm (111 in)	267 cm (105 in)
13	(Brazil) Sheilla Castro	1 July 1983	1.85 m (6 ft 1 in)	64 kg (141 lb)	302 cm (119 in)	284 cm (112 in)
16	(United States) Deja McClendon	27 June 1992	1.85 m (6 ft 1 in)	70 kg (150 lb)	300 cm (120 in)	290 cm (110 in)
17	(Brazil) Kasiely Clemente	6 December 1993	1.82 m (6 ft 0 in)	70 kg (150 lb)	294 cm (116 in)	281 cm (111 in)
18	(Venezuela) Roslandy Acosta	25 February 1992	1.90 m (6 ft 3 in)	62 kg (137 lb)	295 cm (116 in)	291 cm (115 in)
19	(Brazil) Léia Silva (L)	1 March 1985	1.60 m (5 ft 3 in)	60 kg (130 lb)	275 cm (108 in)	269 cm (106 in)

== Pool B ==
=== Dentil Praia Clube ===
The following is the roster of the Brazilian club Dentil Praia Clube in the 2019 FIVB Volleyball Women's Club World Championship.

- Head coach: (Brazil) Paulo Coco

No.	Name	Date of birth	Height	Weight	Spike	Block
1	(Brazil) Walewska Oliveira (C)	1 October 1979	1.90 m (6 ft 3 in)	73 kg (161 lb)	310 cm (120 in)	290 cm (110 in)
2	(Dominican Republic) Brayelin Martínez	11 September 1996	2.01 m (6 ft 7 in)	83 kg (183 lb)	330 cm (130 in)	320 cm (130 in)
4	(Brazil) Cláudia Silva	21 September 1987	1.81 m (5 ft 11 in)	80 kg (180 lb)	290 cm (110 in)	266 cm (105 in)
5	(Brazil) Priscila Daroit	10 August 1988	1.82 m (6 ft 0 in)	74 kg (163 lb)	290 cm (110 in)	280 cm (110 in)
9	(Brazil) Angélica Malinverno	5 July 1989	1.89 m (6 ft 2 in)	78 kg (172 lb)	295 cm (116 in)	290 cm (110 in)
10	(Brazil) Michelle Pavão	31 October 1986	1.78 m (5 ft 10 in)	62 kg (137 lb)	295 cm (116 in)	283 cm (111 in)
11	(United States) Nicole Fawcett	16 December 1986	1.91 m (6 ft 3 in)	82 kg (181 lb)	310 cm (120 in)	291 cm (115 in)
12	(Brazil) Lais Vasques (L)	12 February 1996	1.71 m (5 ft 7 in)	70 kg (150 lb)	275 cm (108 in)	274 cm (108 in)
13	(Brazil) Francyne Jacintho	16 July 1992	1.90 m (6 ft 3 in)	66 kg (146 lb)	304 cm (120 in)	243 cm (96 in)
14	(Brazil) Ananda Marinho	2 May 1989	1.77 m (5 ft 10 in)	74 kg (163 lb)	250 cm (98 in)	240 cm (94 in)
15	(Brazil) Ana Carolina da Silva	8 April 1991	1.83 m (6 ft 0 in)	73 kg (161 lb)	290 cm (110 in)	290 cm (110 in)
16	(Brazil) Fernanda Garay	10 May 1986	1.79 m (5 ft 10 in)	74 kg (163 lb)	308 cm (121 in)	288 cm (113 in)
17	(Brazil) Suelen Pinto (L)	4 October 1987	1.66 m (5 ft 5 in)	81 kg (179 lb)	256 cm (101 in)	238 cm (94 in)
20	(Brazil) Monique Pavão	31 October 1986	1.78 m (5 ft 10 in)	67 kg (148 lb)	294 cm (116 in)	285 cm (112 in)

=== Igor Gorgonzola Novara ===
The following is the roster of the Italian club Igor Gorgonzola Novara in the 2019 FIVB Volleyball Women's Club World Championship.

- Head coach: (Italy) Massimo Barbolini

No.	Name	Date of birth	Height	Weight	Spike	Block
1	(Slovenia) Iza Mlakar	14 November 1995	1.84 m (6 ft 0 in)	66 kg (146 lb)	300 cm (120 in)	272 cm (107 in)
2	(Serbia) Jovana Brakočević	5 March 1988	1.96 m (6 ft 5 in)	82 kg (181 lb)	309 cm (122 in)	295 cm (116 in)
4	(Italy) Rachele Morello	7 November 2000	1.82 m (6 ft 0 in)	77 kg (170 lb)	302 cm (119 in)	296 cm (117 in)
5	(Italy) Francesca Napodano	17 January 1999	1.74 m (5 ft 9 in)	63 kg (139 lb)	290 cm (110 in)	280 cm (110 in)
6	(United States) Megan Courtney	27 October 1993	1.85 m (6 ft 1 in)	61 kg (134 lb)	314 cm (124 in)	300 cm (120 in)
7	(Italy) Federica Piacentini (L)	7 March 2001	1.92 m (6 ft 4 in)	83 kg (183 lb)	306 cm (120 in)	286 cm (113 in)
8	(Poland) Zuzanna Górecka	10 April 2000	1.81 m (5 ft 11 in)	63 kg (139 lb)	301 cm (119 in)	284 cm (112 in)
9	(Italy) Chiara Di Iulio	5 May 1985	1.84 m (6 ft 0 in)	65 kg (143 lb)	291 cm (115 in)	278 cm (109 in)
10	(Italy) Cristina Chirichella (C)	10 February 1994	1.94 m (6 ft 4 in)	79 kg (174 lb)	322 cm (127 in)	306 cm (120 in)
11	(Italy) Stefania Sansonna (L)	1 November 1982	1.75 m (5 ft 9 in)	68 kg (150 lb)	298 cm (117 in)	220 cm (87 in)
12	(United States) Micha Hancock	10 November 1992	1.80 m (5 ft 11 in)	75 kg (165 lb)	305 cm (120 in)	297 cm (117 in)
13	(Italy) Valentina Arrighetti	26 January 1985	1.93 m (6 ft 4 in)	72 kg (159 lb)	320 cm (130 in)	310 cm (120 in)
16	(Bulgaria) Elitsa Vasileva	13 May 1990	1.90 m (6 ft 3 in)	73 kg (161 lb)	302 cm (119 in)	290 cm (110 in)
17	(Serbia) Stefana Veljković	9 January 1990	1.90 m (6 ft 3 in)	76 kg (168 lb)	325 cm (128 in)	310 cm (120 in)

=== Tianjin Bohai Bank VC ===
The following is the roster of the Chinese club Tianjin Bohai Bank VC in the 2019 FIVB Volleyball Women's Club World Championship.

- Head coach: (China) Chen Youquan

No.	Name	Date of birth	Height	Weight	Spike	Block
1	(China) Li Yingying	16 February 2000	1.92 m (6 ft 4 in)	71 kg (157 lb)	302 cm (119 in)	294 cm (116 in)
3	(China) Yuan Yumo	7 August 1997	1.86 m (6 ft 1 in)	78 kg (172 lb)	309 cm (122 in)	302 cm (119 in)
4	(China) Yu Junwei	4 July 1994	1.88 m (6 ft 2 in)	72 kg (159 lb)	308 cm (121 in)	300 cm (120 in)
5	(China) Zhu Ting (C)	29 November 1994	1.98 m (6 ft 6 in)	78 kg (172 lb)	327 cm (129 in)	300 cm (120 in)
7	(China) Yang Yi	19 March 1997	1.84 m (6 ft 0 in)	70 kg (150 lb)	308 cm (121 in)	300 cm (120 in)
9	(United States) Destinee Hooker	7 September 1987	1.93 m (6 ft 4 in)	73 kg (161 lb)	320 cm (130 in)	304 cm (120 in)
10	(China) Liu Liwen (L)	2 August 1994	1.72 m (5 ft 8 in)	67 kg (148 lb)	289 cm (114 in)	284 cm (112 in)
12	(China) Yuan Xinyue	21 December 1996	2.01 m (6 ft 7 in)	78 kg (172 lb)	317 cm (125 in)	311 cm (122 in)
13	(China) Meng Zixuan (L)	18 November 1996	1.80 m (5 ft 11 in)	62 kg (137 lb)	298 cm (117 in)	290 cm (110 in)
15	(China) Wang Yuanyuan	14 July 1997	1.95 m (6 ft 5 in)	75 kg (165 lb)	312 cm (123 in)	300 cm (120 in)
16	(China) Yao Di	15 August 1992	1.82 m (6 ft 0 in)	65 kg (143 lb)	306 cm (120 in)	298 cm (117 in)
18	(China) Chen Xintong	8 April 1994	1.78 m (5 ft 10 in)	69 kg (152 lb)	297 cm (117 in)	290 cm (110 in)
19	(China) Li Yanan	12 May 1998	1.87 m (6 ft 2 in)	70 kg (150 lb)	308 cm (121 in)	302 cm (119 in)
20	(China) Wang Yizhu	23 March 2001	1.89 m (6 ft 2 in)	75 kg (165 lb)	318 cm (125 in)	305 cm (120 in)

=== Vakıfbank İstanbul ===
The following is the roster of the Turkish club Vakıfbank İstanbul in the 2019 FIVB Volleyball Women's Club World Championship.

- Head coach: (Italy) Giovanni Guidetti

No.	Name	Date of birth	Height	Weight	Spike	Block
1	(Turkey) Hatice Gizem Örge (L)	26 April 1993	1.70 m (5 ft 7 in)	59 kg (130 lb)	270 cm (110 in)	260 cm (100 in)
3	(Turkey) Cansu Özbay	17 October 1996	1.82 m (6 ft 0 in)	78 kg (172 lb)	298 cm (117 in)	290 cm (110 in)
8	(Turkey) Ayşe Melis Gürkaynak (C)	20 April 1990	1.83 m (6 ft 0 in)	68 kg (150 lb)	300 cm (120 in)	280 cm (110 in)
9	(Turkey) Meliha İsmailoğlu	17 September 1993	1.88 m (6 ft 2 in)	73 kg (161 lb)	303 cm (119 in)	291 cm (115 in)
10	(Brazil) Gabriela Guimarães	19 May 1994	1.80 m (5 ft 11 in)	65 kg (143 lb)	305 cm (120 in)	289 cm (114 in)
11	(Sweden) Isabelle Haak	11 July 1999	1.95 m (6 ft 5 in)	83 kg (183 lb)	330 cm (130 in)	316 cm (124 in)
12	(Turkey) Pınar Atasever	12 December 1986	1.72 m (5 ft 8 in)	56 kg (123 lb)	260 cm (100 in)	252 cm (99 in)
14	(Turkey) Gözde Yılmaz	9 September 1991	1.94 m (6 ft 4 in)	79 kg (174 lb)	316 cm (124 in)	306 cm (120 in)
15	(Turkey) Ebrar Karakurt	17 January 2000	1.96 m (6 ft 5 in)	73 kg (161 lb)	315 cm (124 in)	304 cm (120 in)
16	(Serbia) Milena Rašić	25 October 1990	1.93 m (6 ft 4 in)	72 kg (159 lb)	315 cm (124 in)	310 cm (120 in)
17	(Serbia) Maja Ognjenović	6 August 1984	1.83 m (6 ft 0 in)	67 kg (148 lb)	300 cm (120 in)	293 cm (115 in)
18	(Turkey) Zehra Güneş	7 July 1999	1.97 m (6 ft 6 in)	88 kg (194 lb)	319 cm (126 in)	310 cm (120 in)
