= 2021 FIVB Volleyball Women's Club World Championship squads =

This article shows the rosters of all participating teams at the 2021 FIVB Volleyball Women's Club World Championship in Ankara, Turkey.

== Altay VC ==
The following is the roster of the Kazakhstani club Altay VC in the 2021 FIVB Volleyball Women's Club World Championship.

No.	Name	Date of birth	Height	Position
1	(Kazakhstan) Perizat Nurbergenova	29 March 2004	1.77 m (5 ft 10 in)	outside hitter
2	(Kazakhstan) Sana Anarkulova	21 July 1989	1.88 m (6 ft 2 in)	outside hitter
6	(Kazakhstan) Saniya Balagazinova	16 November 2002	1.79 m (5 ft 10 in)	middle blocker
7	(Kazakhstan) Sarina Sitkasinova	20 March 1993	1.82 m (6 ft 0 in)	libero
8	(Kazakhstan) Polina Ufimtseva	13 November 1995	1.85 m (6 ft 1 in)	middle blocker
9	(Kazakhstan) Lyudmila Issayeva	26 September 1989	1.84 m (6 ft 0 in)	middle blocker
10	(Kazakhstan) Irina Kenzhebaeva	20 February 1992	1.80 m (5 ft 11 in)	opposite
11	(Kazakhstan) Yelizaveta Meister	1 November 1997	1.77 m (5 ft 10 in)	setter
13	(Kazakhstan) Kristina Belova	28 November 1998	1.84 m (6 ft 0 in)	opposite
14	(Serbia) Danica Radenković	9 October 1992	1.85 m (6 ft 1 in)	setter
15	(Kazakhstan) Madina Beket	6 November 1999	1.60 m (5 ft 3 in)	libero
16	(Ukraine) Nadiia Kodola	29 September 1998	1.84 m (6 ft 0 in)	outside hitter
17	(Dominican Republic) Bethania de la Cruz	13 May 1987	1.88 m (6 ft 2 in)	outside hitter
18	(Kazakhstan) Kristina Anikonova	5 January 1991	1.85 m (6 ft 1 in)	middle blocker
Head coach:		(Serbia) Marko Gršić		

== Dentil Praia Clube ==
The following is the roster of the Brazilian club Dentil Praia Clube in the 2021 FIVB Volleyball Women's Club World Championship.

No.	Name	Date of birth	Height	Position
1	(Brazil) Walewska Oliveira	1 October 1979	1.90 m (6 ft 3 in)	middle blocker
2	(Dominican Republic) Brayelin Martínez	11 September 1996	2.01 m (6 ft 7 in)	outside hitter
3	(Dominican Republic) Jineiry Martínez	3 December 1997	1.92 m (6 ft 4 in)	middle blocker
4	(Brazil) Cláudia da Silva	21 September 1987	1.81 m (5 ft 11 in)	setter
9	(Brazil) Angelica Malinverno	5 July 1989	1.89 m (6 ft 2 in)	middle blocker
10	(Brazil) Tainara Santos	9 March 2000	1.90 m (6 ft 3 in)	outside hitter
11	(Netherlands) Anne Buijs	2 December 1991	1.91 m (6 ft 3 in)	outside hitter
12	(Brazil) Ariane Helena	27 January 1996	1.92 m (6 ft 4 in)	opposite
13	(Brazil) Kasiely Clemente	6 December 1993	1.82 m (6 ft 0 in)	outside hitter
14	(Brazil) Juliana Perdigão	5 April 1991	1.61 m (5 ft 3 in)	libero
15	(Brazil) Ana Carolina da Silva	8 April 1991	1.83 m (6 ft 0 in)	middle blocker
16	(Brazil) Vanessa Janke	8 March 1991	1.84 m (6 ft 0 in)	opposite
17	(Brazil) Suelen Pinto	4 October 1987	1.66 m (5 ft 5 in)	libero
19	(Brazil) Lyara Medeiros	19 September 1996	1.84 m (6 ft 0 in)	setter
Head coach:		(Brazil) Paulo Barros		

== Fenerbahçe Opet İstanbul ==
The following is the roster of the Turkish club Fenerbahçe Opet İstanbul in the 2021 FIVB Volleyball Women's Club World Championship.

No.	Name	Date of birth	Height	Position
1	(Turkey) Gizem Örge	26 April 1993	1.72 m (5 ft 8 in)	libero
4	(Russia) Anna Lazareva	31 January 1997	1.90 m (6 ft 3 in)	opposite
5	(Turkey) Beliz Başkır	26 December 1998	1.95 m (6 ft 5 in)	middle blocker
7	(Turkey) Cansu Çetin	26 May 1993	1.81 m (5 ft 11 in)	libero
8	(Turkey) Dicle Nur Babat	15 September 1992	1.91 m (6 ft 3 in)	middle blocker
9	(Turkey) Meliha İsmailoğlu	17 September 1993	1.82 m (6 ft 0 in)	outside hitter
10	(Russia) Arina Fedorovtseva	19 January 2004	1.90 m (6 ft 3 in)	outside hitter
11	(Turkey) Naz Aydemir	14 August 1990	1.86 m (6 ft 1 in)	setter
12	(Brazil) Ana Cristina de Souza	7 April 2004	1.92 m (6 ft 4 in)	outside hitter
14	(Turkey) Eda Erdem	22 June 1987	1.88 m (6 ft 2 in)	middle blocker
15	(Serbia) Mina Popović	16 September 1994	1.87 m (6 ft 2 in)	middle blocker
16	(Turkey) İpar Özay Kurt	10 November 2003	1.86 m (6 ft 1 in)	outside hitter
17	(Turkey) Tutku Burcu Yüzgenç	15 January 1999	1.92 m (6 ft 4 in)	opposite
18	(Turkey) Buse Ünal	29 July 1997	1.84 m (6 ft 0 in)	setter
Head coach:		(Serbia) Zoran Terzić		

== Imoco Volley Conegliano ==
The following is the roster of the Italian club Imoco Volley Conegliano in the 2021 FIVB Volleyball Women's Club World Championship.

No.	Name	Date of birth	Height	Position
1	(Italy) Lara Caravello	4 May 1994	1.74 m (5 ft 9 in)	libero
2	(United States) Kathryn Plummer	16 October 1998	1.98 m (6 ft 6 in)	outside hitter
3	(United States) Megan Courtney	27 October 1993	1.85 m (6 ft 1 in)	outside hitter
4	(Croatia) Božana Butigan	19 August 2000	1.92 m (6 ft 4 in)	middle blocker
5	(Netherlands) Robin De Kruijf	5 May 1991	1.92 m (6 ft 4 in)	middle blocker
7	(Italy) Raphaela Folie	7 March 1991	1.87 m (6 ft 2 in)	middle blocker
9	(Italy) Loveth Omoruyi	25 August 2002	1.84 m (6 ft 0 in)	outside hitter
10	(Italy) Monica De Gennaro	8 January 1987	1.74 m (5 ft 9 in)	libero
11	(Bulgaria) Hristina Vuchkova	1 October 1991	1.90 m (6 ft 3 in)	middle blocker
12	(Italy) Giorgia Frosini	29 November 2002	1.88 m (6 ft 2 in)	opposite
13	(Italy) Giulia Gennari	23 June 1996	1.84 m (6 ft 0 in)	setter
14	(Poland) Joanna Wołosz	7 April 1990	1.81 m (5 ft 11 in)	setter
17	(Italy) Miriam Sylla	8 January 1995	1.84 m (6 ft 0 in)	outside hitter
18	(Italy) Paola Egonu	18 December 1998	1.93 m (6 ft 4 in)	opposite
Head coach:		(Italy) Daniele Santarelli		

== Itambé Minas ==
The following is the roster of the Brazilian club Itambé Minas in the 2021 FIVB Volleyball Women's Club World Championship.

No.	Name	Date of birth	Height	Position
2	(Brazil) Carol Gattaz	27 July 1981	1.92 m (6 ft 4 in)	middle blocker
3	(Brazil) Macris Carneiro	3 March 1989	1.78 m (5 ft 10 in)	setter
5	(Brazil) Priscila Daroit	10 August 1988	1.84 m (6 ft 0 in)	outside hitter
6	(Brazil) Thaisa Menezes	15 May 1987	1.96 m (6 ft 5 in)	middle blocker
8	(Brazil) Júlia Kudiess	2 January 2003	1.92 m (6 ft 4 in)	middle blocker
9	(Brazil) Kisy Nascimento	28 January 2000	1.91 m (6 ft 3 in)	opposite
10	(Brazil) Júlia Moreira	10 January 1999	1.63 m (5 ft 4 in)	libero
11	(Brazil) Priscila Heldes	27 March 1992	1.79 m (5 ft 10 in)	setter
13	(Turkey) Neriman Özsoy	13 July 1988	1.88 m (6 ft 2 in)	opposite
14	(Brazil) Luiza Vicente	22 June 2004	1.85 m (6 ft 1 in)	outside hitter
16	(Brazil) Priscila Souza	29 October 1987	1.84 m (6 ft 0 in)	outside hitter
18	(Brazil) Rebeca Camille	21 April 2004	1.97 m (6 ft 6 in)	middle blocker
19	(Brazil) Léia Silva	1 March 1985	1.60 m (5 ft 3 in)	libero
20	(United States) Danielle Cuttino	22 June 1996	1.95 m (6 ft 5 in)	opposite
Head coach:		(Italy) Nicola Negro		

== VakıfBank İstanbul ==
The following is the roster of the Turkish club VakıfBank İstanbul in the 2021 FIVB Volleyball Women's Club World Championship.

No.	Name	Date of birth	Height	Position
1	(Turkey) Buket Gülübay	28 February 1999	1.86 m (6 ft 1 in)	setter
3	(Turkey) Cansu Özbay	17 October 1996	1.79 m (5 ft 10 in)	setter
4	(Turkey) Tuğba Şenoğlu	2 February 1998	1.82 m (6 ft 0 in)	outside hitter
5	(Turkey) Ayça Aykaç	27 February 1996	1.73 m (5 ft 8 in)	libero
6	(Turkey) Kübra Akman	13 October 1994	2.00 m (6 ft 7 in)	middle blocker
7	(United States) Chiaka Ogbogu	15 April 1995	1.88 m (6 ft 2 in)	middle blocker
8	(Turkey) Ayşe Melis Gürkaynak	20 April 1990	1.83 m (6 ft 0 in)	middle blocker
10	(Brazil) Gabriela Guimarães	19 May 1994	1.80 m (5 ft 11 in)	outside hitter
11	(Sweden) Isabelle Haak	11 July 1999	1.95 m (6 ft 5 in)	opposite
13	(Turkey) Meryem Boz	3 February 1988	1.90 m (6 ft 3 in)	opposite
14	(United States) Michelle Bartsch-Hackley	12 February 1990	1.90 m (6 ft 3 in)	outside hitter
16	(Turkey) Aylin Acar	21 July 1995	1.72 m (5 ft 8 in)	libero
17	(Turkey) Derya Cebecioğlu	24 October 2000	1.81 m (5 ft 11 in)	outside hitter
18	(Turkey) Zehra Güneş	7 July 1999	1.98 m (6 ft 6 in)	middle blocker
Head coach:		(Italy) Giovanni Guidetti		
