= 2022 FIVB Women's Volleyball Club World Championship squads =

This article shows the rosters of all participating teams at the 2022 FIVB Women's Volleyball Club World Championship in Antalya, Turkey.

== Dentil Praia Clube ==
The following is the roster of the Brazilian club Dentil Praia Clube in the 2022 FIVB Women's Volleyball Club World Championship.

No.	Name	Date of birth	Height	Position
2	(Dominican Republic) Brayelin Martínez	11 September 1996	2.01 m (6 ft 7 in)	outside hitter
3	(Dominican Republic) Jineiry Martínez	3 December 1997	1.92 m (6 ft 4 in)	middle blocker
4	(Brazil) Cláudia da Silva	21 September 1987	1.81 m (5 ft 11 in)	setter
9	(Brazil) Angelica Malinverno	5 July 1989	1.89 m (6 ft 2 in)	middle blocker
10	(Brazil) Tainara Santos	9 March 2000	1.90 m (6 ft 3 in)	outside hitter
11	(Netherlands) Anne Buijs	2 December 1991	1.91 m (6 ft 3 in)	outside hitter
12	(Brazil) Ariane Teixeira	27 January 1996	1.92 m (6 ft 4 in)	opposite
13	(Brazil) Kasiely Clemente	6 December 1993	1.82 m (6 ft 0 in)	outside hitter
14	(Brazil) Juliana Perdigão	5 April 1991	1.61 m (5 ft 3 in)	libero
15	(Brazil) Ana Carolina da Silva	8 April 1991	1.83 m (6 ft 0 in)	middle blocker
16	(Brazil) Vanessa Janke	8 March 1991	1.84 m (6 ft 0 in)	opposite
17	(Brazil) Suelen Pinto	4 October 1987	1.66 m (5 ft 5 in)	libero
18	(Brazil) Letícia Hage	9 September 1990	1.87 m (6 ft 2 in)	middle blocker
19	(Brazil) Lyara Medeiros	19 September 1996	1.84 m (6 ft 0 in)	setter
Head coach:		(Brazil) Paulo Barros		

== Eczacıbaşı Dynavit ==
The following is the roster of the Turkish club Eczacıbaşı Dynavit in the 2022 FIVB Women's Volleyball Club World Championship.

No.	Name	Date of birth	Height	Position
1	(Turkey) Tuna Aybüke Özel	24 April 2002	1.63 m (5 ft 4 in)	libero
2	(Turkey) Simge Şebnem Aköz	23 April 1991	1.68 m (5 ft 6 in)	libero
3	(Serbia) Tijana Bošković	8 March 1997	1.93 m (6 ft 4 in)	opposite
4	(Turkey) Beyza Arıcı	27 July 1995	1.90 m (6 ft 3 in)	middle blocker
5	(Belgium) Laura Heyrman	17 May 1993	1.86 m (6 ft 1 in)	middle blocker
6	(Turkey) Saliha Şahin	5 November 1998	1.83 m (6 ft 0 in)	outside hitter
7	(Turkey) Hande Baladın	1 September 1997	1.87 m (6 ft 2 in)	outside hitter
8	(Turkey) Yasemin Güveli	5 January 1999	1.88 m (6 ft 2 in)	middle blocker
10	(Serbia) Maja Ognjenović	6 August 1984	1.83 m (6 ft 0 in)	setter
12	(Turkey) Elif Şahin	19 January 2001	1.84 m (6 ft 0 in)	setter
13	(Croatia) Samanta Fabris	8 February 1992	1.90 m (6 ft 3 in)	opposite
14	(Turkey) Yaprak Erkek	2 September 2001	1.82 m (6 ft 0 in)	outside hitter
18	(Russia) Irina Voronkova	20 October 1995	1.90 m (6 ft 3 in)	outside hitter
88	(Trinidad and Tobago) Sinead Jack	8 November 1993	1.98 m (6 ft 6 in)	middle blocker
Head coach:		(Turkey) Ferhat Akbaş		

== Gerdau Minas ==
The following is the roster of the Brazilian club Gerdau Minas in the 2022 FIVB Women's Volleyball Club World Championship.

No.	Name	Date of birth	Height	Position
2	(Brazil) Carol Gattaz	27 July 1981	1.92 m (6 ft 4 in)	middle blocker
4	(Dominican Republic) Yonkaira Peña	10 May 1993	1.90 m (6 ft 3 in)	outside hitter
5	(Brazil) Priscila Daroit	10 August 1988	1.84 m (6 ft 0 in)	outside hitter
6	(Brazil) Thaisa Menezes	15 May 1987	1.96 m (6 ft 5 in)	middle blocker
7	(Brazil) Nyeme Costa	11 October 1998	1.75 m (5 ft 9 in)	libero
8	(Brazil) Júlia Kudiess	2 January 2003	1.92 m (6 ft 4 in)	middle blocker
9	(Brazil) Kisy Nascimento	28 January 2000	1.91 m (6 ft 3 in)	opposite
11	(Brazil) Priscila Heldes	27 March 1992	1.79 m (5 ft 10 in)	setter
12	(Brazil) Larissa Fortes	16 August 2004	1.67 m (5 ft 6 in)	libero
13	(Brazil) Jackeline Pina	30 December 1999	1.74 m (5 ft 9 in)	setter
14	(Brazil) Luiza Vicente	22 June 2004	1.85 m (6 ft 1 in)	outside hitter
15	(Brazil) Larissa Mendes	3 March 2005	1.91 m (6 ft 3 in)	outside hitter
16	(Brazil) Priscila Ramos	29 October 1987	1.84 m (6 ft 0 in)	outside hitter
18	(Brazil) Rebeca Silva	21 April 2004	1.97 m (6 ft 6 in)	middle blocker
Head coach:		(Italy) Nicola Negro		

== Imoco Volley Conegliano ==
The following is the roster of the Italian club Imoco Volley Conegliano in the 2022 FIVB Women's Volleyball Club World Championship.

No.	Name	Date of birth	Height	Position
1	(Italy) Roberta Carraro	17 November 1998	1.81 m (5 ft 11 in)	setter
2	(United States) Kathryn Plummer	16 October 1998	1.98 m (6 ft 6 in)	outside hitter
3	(United States) Kelsey Cook	25 June 1992	1.88 m (6 ft 2 in)	outside hitter
4	(Italy) Federica Squarcini	24 September 2000	1.81 m (5 ft 11 in)	middle blocker
5	(Netherlands) Robin De Kruijf	5 May 1991	1.92 m (6 ft 4 in)	middle blocker
6	(Italy) Alessia Gennari	3 November 1991	1.84 m (6 ft 0 in)	outside hitter
8	(Canada) Alexa Gray	7 August 1994	1.85 m (6 ft 1 in)	outside hitter
9	(Italy) Marina Lubian	11 April 2000	1.93 m (6 ft 4 in)	middle blocker
10	(Italy) Monica De Gennaro	8 January 1987	1.74 m (5 ft 9 in)	libero
11	(Sweden) Isabelle Haak	11 July 1999	1.95 m (6 ft 5 in)	opposite
12	(Italy) Ylenia Pericati	22 March 1994	1.74 m (5 ft 9 in)	libero
13	(Italy) Eleonora Furlan	10 March 1995	1.89 m (6 ft 2 in)	middle blocker
14	(Poland) Joanna Wołosz	7 April 1990	1.81 m (5 ft 11 in)	setter
20	(Italy) Anna Bardaro	29 April 2005	1.77 m (5 ft 10 in)	libero
Head coach:		(Italy) Daniele Santarelli		

== Kuanysh ==
The following is the roster of the Kazakhstani club Kuanysh in the 2022 FIVB Women's Volleyball Club World Championship.

No.	Name	Date of birth	Height	Position
1	(Bulgaria) Lora Kitipova	19 May 1991	1.84 m (6 ft 0 in)	setter
2	(Kazakhstan) Sabira Bekisheva	21 February 1998	1.69 m (5 ft 7 in)	libero
3	(Kazakhstan) Alena Kolotygina	23 March 1996	1.82 m (6 ft 0 in)	opposite
4	(Kazakhstan) Ekaterina Mikhailova	4 May 1998	1.84 m (6 ft 0 in)	outside hitter
5	(Kazakhstan) Botagoz Yessimkhan	16 May 1997	1.72 m (5 ft 8 in)	setter
7	(Kazakhstan) Tatyana Aldoshina	23 April 1998	1.85 m (6 ft 1 in)	opposite
9	(Kazakhstan) Olessya Feldbush	17 January 2003	1.86 m (6 ft 1 in)	middle blocker
10	(Kazakhstan) Yuliya Borovkova	12 March 2003	1.87 m (6 ft 2 in)	middle blocker
12	(France) Mäeva Orlé	8 May 1991	1.85 m (6 ft 1 in)	outside hitter
17	(Kazakhstan) Margarita Belchenko	21 March 1999	1.77 m (5 ft 10 in)	outside hitter
18	(Kazakhstan) Anastassiya Kolomoyets	18 April 1991	1.82 m (6 ft 0 in)	middle blocker
20	(Kazakhstan) Kristina Shvidkaya	3 January 2002	1.63 m (5 ft 4 in)	libero
27	(Kazakhstan) Natalya Smirnova	29 December 1999	1.85 m (6 ft 1 in)	middle blocker
Head coach:		(Serbia) Darko Dobreskov		

== VakıfBank İstanbul ==
The following is the roster of the VakıfBank İstanbul in the FIVB Women's Volleyball Club World Championship.

No.	Name	Date of birth	Height	Position
3	(Turkey) Cansu Özbay	17 October 1996	1.79 m (5 ft 10 in)	setter
5	(Turkey) Ayça Aykaç	27 February 1996	1.73 m (5 ft 8 in)	libero
6	(Turkey) Kübra Akman	13 October 1994	2.00 m (6 ft 7 in)	middle blocker
7	(United States) Chiaka Ogbogu	15 April 1995	1.88 m (6 ft 2 in)	middle blocker
8	(Italy) Paola Egonu	18 December 1998	1.93 m (6 ft 4 in)	opposite
10	(Brazil) Gabriela Guimarães	19 May 1994	1.80 m (5 ft 11 in)	outside hitter
13	(Turkey) Buket Gülübay	28 February 1999	1.86 m (6 ft 1 in)	setter
14	(Turkey) Alexia Căruțașu	10 June 2003	1.83 m (6 ft 0 in)	opposite
15	(United States) Kara Bajema	24 March 1998	1.90 m (6 ft 3 in)	outside hitter
16	(Turkey) Aylin Acar	21 July 1995	1.72 m (5 ft 8 in)	libero
17	(Turkey) Derya Cebecioğlu	24 October 2000	1.81 m (5 ft 11 in)	outside hitter
18	(Turkey) Zehra Güneş	7 July 1999	2.03 m (6 ft 8 in)	middle blocker
19	(Netherlands) Nika Daalderop	29 November 1998	1.89 m (6 ft 2 in)	outside hitter
21	(Turkey) Bahar Akbay	21 January 1998	1.88 m (6 ft 2 in)	middle blocker
Head coach:		(Italy) Giovanni Guidetti		
