= 2019 Women's South American Volleyball Club Championship =

Eleventh official edition of the Women's South American Volleyball Club Championship

2019 Women's South American Club Championship
Tournament details
- Host country: Brazil
- Dates: 19 to 23 February
- Teams: 5
- Venue: 1 (in 1 host city)

Final positions
- Champions: (Brazil) Minas Tênis (2nd title)

Tournament awards
- MVP: (Brazil) Carol Gattaz

The 2019 Women's South American Volleyball Club Championship was the eleventh official edition of the Women's South American Volleyball Club Championship, played by five teams from February, 19 to February 23, 2019, in Belo Horizonte, Minas Gerais, Brazil.

Minas Tênis Clube won its second consecutive and overall title, and qualified for the 2019 FIVB Volleyball Women's Club World Championship. The Brazilian middle blocker Carol Gattaz was elected the competition MVP.

== Pools composition ==
Pool
(Argentina) Boca Juniors
(Bolivia) Olympic
(Brazil) Minas Tênis
(Brazil) Praia
(Argentina) San Lorenzo

== Venue ==
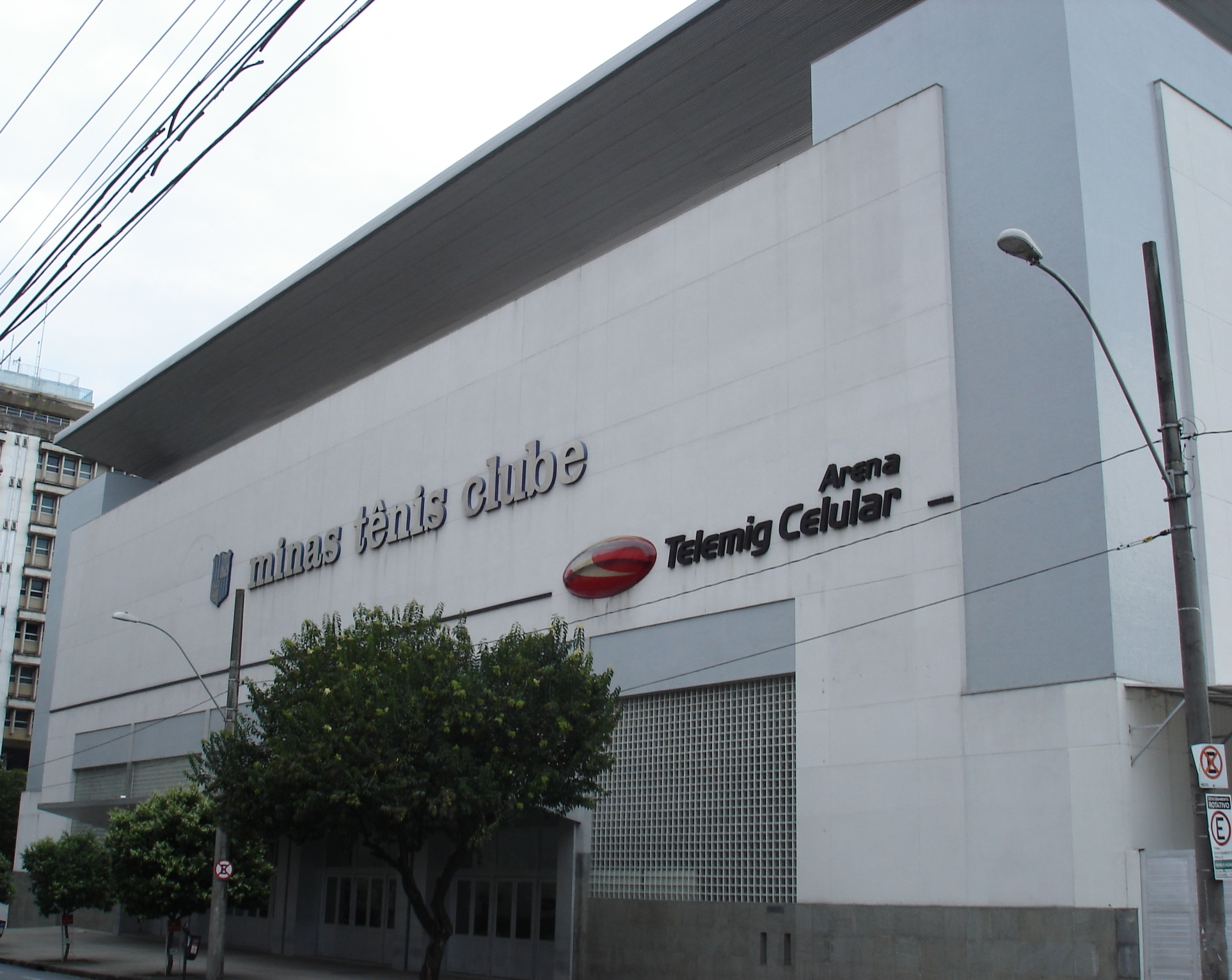
Arena Minas

All the matches were played at the Arena Minas in Belo Horizonte, Brazil.

== Round-robin pool ==
- All times are Brasília Time (UTC−03:00).

Pos	Team	Pld	W	L	Pts	SW	SL	SR	SPW	SPL	SPR	Qualification
1	(Brazil) Minas Tênis	4	4	0	12	12	0	MAX	301	187	1.610	Champions and qualified for the 2019 Club World Championship
2	(Brazil) Praia	4	3	1	9	9	3	3.000	286	187	1.529	
3	(Argentina) San Lorenzo	4	2	2	6	6	6	1.000	237	247	0.960	
4	(Argentina) Boca Juniors	4	1	3	3	3	9	0.333	215	271	0.793	
5	(Bolivia) Olympic	4	0	4	0	0	12	0.000	154	300	0.513	

Date	Time		Score		Set 1	Set 2	Set 3	Set 4	Set 5	Total
19 Feb	18:00	Praia (Brazil)	3–0	(Argentina) Boca Juniors	25–17	25–12	25–13			75–42
19 Feb	20:00	Minas Tênis (Brazil)	3–0	(Bolivia) Olympic	25–11	25–13	25–12			75–36
20 Feb	18:00	San Lorenzo (Argentina)	3–0	(Bolivia) Olympic	25–11	25–14	25–12			75–37
20 Feb	20:00	Minas Tênis (Brazil)	3–0	(Argentina) Boca Juniors	25–9	25–14	25–15			75–38
21 Feb	18:00	Boca Juniors (Argentina)	3–0	(Bolivia) Olympic	25–16	25–12	25–18			75–46
21 Feb	20:00	Praia (Brazil)	3–0	(Argentina) San Lorenzo	25–6	25–18	25–10			75–34
22 Feb	15:00	Praia (Brazil)	3–0	(Bolivia) Olympic	25–13	25–5	25–17			75–35
22 Feb	17:00	Minas Tênis (Brazil)	3–0	(Argentina) San Lorenzo	25–22	25–12	25–19			75–53
23 Feb	11:30	Boca Juniors (Argentina)	0–3	(Argentina) San Lorenzo	21–25	19–25	20–25			60–75
23 Feb	13:00	Minas Tênis (Brazil)	3–0	(Brazil) Praia	25–21	25–16	26–24			75–61

== Final standing ==
Rank	Team
1st place, gold medalist(s)	(Brazil) Minas Tênis
2nd place, silver medalist(s)	(Brazil) Praia
3rd place, bronze medalist(s)	(Argentina) San Lorenzo
4	(Argentina) Boca Juniors
5	(Bolivia) Olympic

Qualified for the 2019 Club World Championship

2019 Women's South American Volleyball Club Championship

2nd title

14–woman roster
Mara Leão, Caroline Gattaz (c), Macris Carneiro, Luanna Emiliano, Lana Conceição, Maria Luisa Oliveira, Bruna Silva, Gabriela Guimarães, Natália Pereira, Laura Kudiess, Georgia Cattani, Mayany de Souza, Leia Silva, Bruna Costa

== All-Star team ==
The following players were chosen for the tournament's "All-Star team":

- Most valuable player
  - (Brazil) Carol Gattaz (Minas Tênis)
- Best Opposite
  - (Brazil) Bruna da Silva (Minas Tênis)
- Best outside hitters
  - (Brazil) Fernanda Garay (Praia)
  - (Brazil) Gabriela Guimarães (Minas Tênis)
- Best setter
  - (Brazil) Macris Carneiro (Minas Tênis)
- Best middle blockers
  - (Brazil) Fabiana Claudino (Praia)
  - (Argentina) Bianca Farriol (San Lorenzo)
- Best libero
  - (Brazil) Léia Silva (Minas Tênis)

== See also ==
- 2019 Men's South American Volleyball Club Championship
