= Juscelino Kubitschek Arena =

Indoor stadium in Belo Horizonte, Brazil

Juscelino Kubitschek
- Arena do Minas, Arena da rua da Bahia
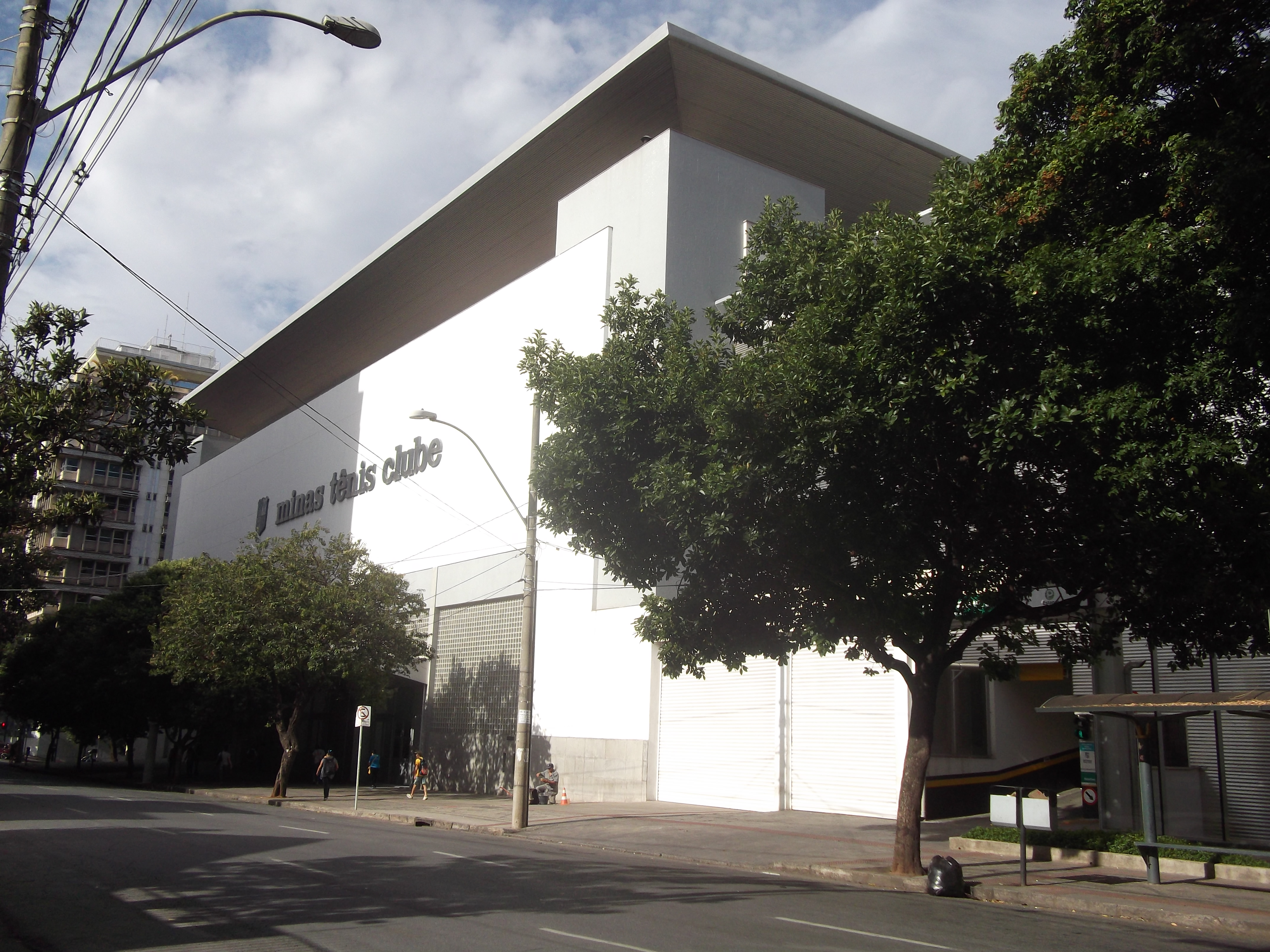
- Interactive map of Juscelino Kubitschek
- Full name: Juscelino Kubitschek Arena
- Location: Belo Horizonte, Minas Gerais, Brazil
- Coordinates: 19°56′10″S 43°56′28″W
- Owner: Minas Tênis Clube
- Capacity: 3400

The Juscelino Kubitschek Arena is the indoor multisport stadium of the Minas Tênis Clube. The name is a homage to the former Belo Horizonte mayor, former Minas Gerais governor, and former Brazilian president Juscelino Kubitschek. The stadium is currently called Arena UniBH due to naming rights after a partnership deal with the University Center of Belo Horizonte. In the past, it has been called Telemig Celular Arena and Vivo Arena for the same reason.

It is located in the Lourdes neighborhood in Belo Horizonte, Brazil, and is part of the Minas I complex, the club's headquarters. The stadium occupies an area of more than 15,600 m^{2}. Its capacity can reach up to 3,400 spectators, depending on the type of event it is hosting.
