= Lara Nobre =

Brazilian volleyball player

Lara Nobre Cardoso Gonçalves Filomeno (born 11 February 1989), is a volleyball player from Brazil who plays as middle blocker, playing for the Brazilian National Team.

== Career ==
She competed at the 2019 FIVB Volleyball Women's Nations League. She played for Fluminense FC, and Minas Tênis Clube.
