= João Pedro Pio =

Brazilian futsal player

João Pedro
Personal information
- Full name: João Pedro Teixeira de Jesus Pio
- Date of birth: 27 March 1996 (age 30)
- Place of birth: Belo Horizonte, Brazil
- Height: 1.73 m (5 ft 8 in)
- Positions: Defender; winger

Team information
- Current team: Minas
- Number: 33

Youth career
- –2014: Minas

Senior career*
| Years | Team | Apps | (Gls) |
| 2014– | Minas | | |

International career^{‡}
| 2018– | Brazil | | |
- * Club domestic league appearances and goals as of 00:00, 25 May 2019 (UTC) ‡ National team caps and goals as of 00:00, 25 May 2019 (UTC)

João Pedro Teixeira de Jesus Pio (born 27 March 1996) is a Brazilian futsal player who plays as a defender for Minas and the Brazilian national futsal team.
