= Saliha Şahin =

Turkish volleyball player

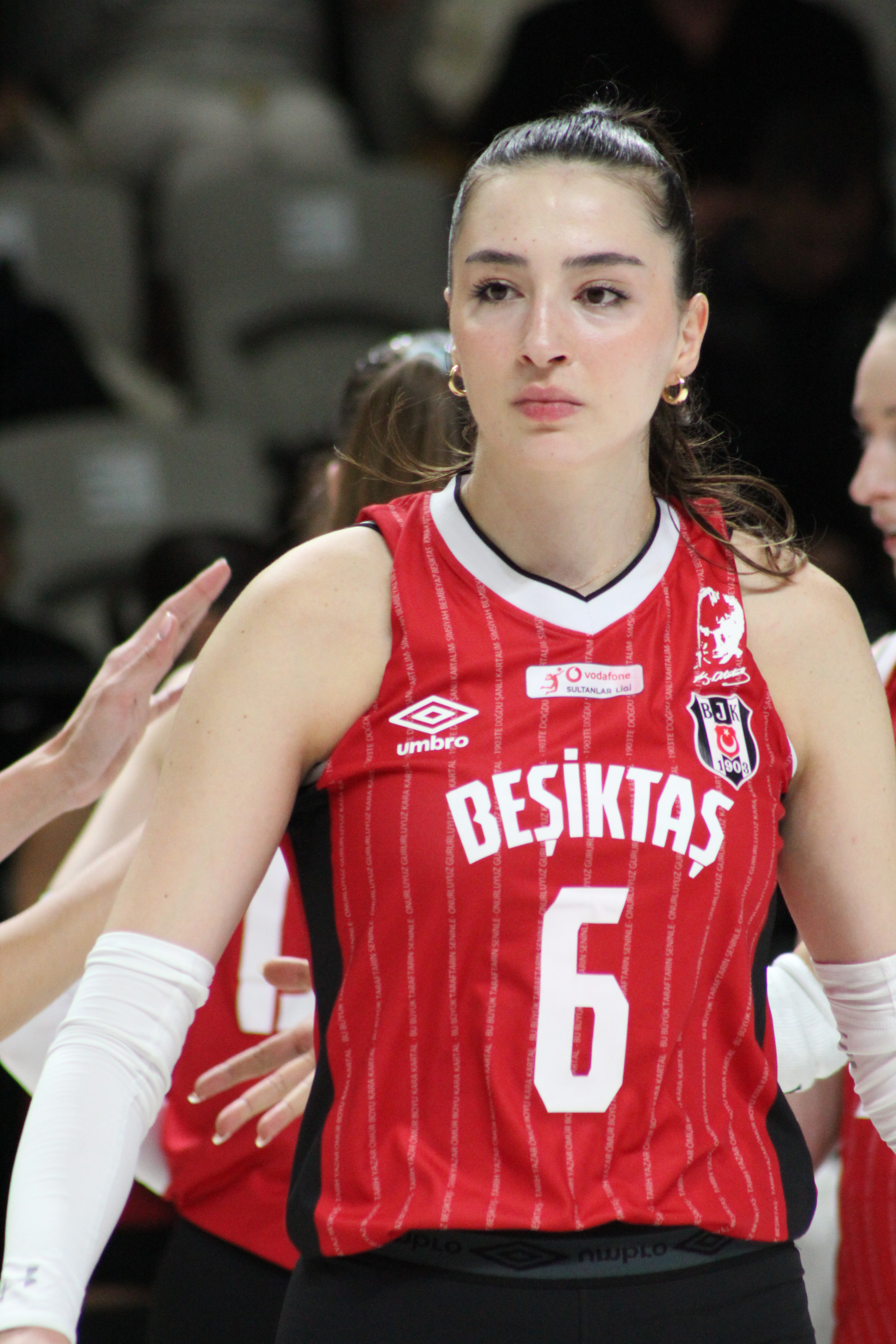

Personal information
- Nationality: Turkish
- Born: 5 November 1998 (age 27); Ankara, Turkey
- Height: 1.86 m (6 ft 1 in)
- Weight: 68 kg (150 lb)
- Spike: 304 cm (120 in)
- Block: 294 cm (116 in)

Volleyball information
- Position: Outside hitter
- Current club: Fenerbahçe

Career
Years
- 2015–2019
- 2019–2020
- 2019–2023
- 2023– 2024
- 2024-2025
- 2025-2026
- 2026-
Teams
- →Karayolları
- →Sarıyer Bld.
- Eczacıbaşı Dynavit
- →KPS Chemik Police
- Beşiktaş JK
- Zeren S.K
- Fenerbahçe

National team
- 2015
- 2016
- 2017
- 2017
- 2018–
- Turkey U-17
- Turkey U-19
- Turkey U-20
- Turkey U-23
- Turkey
Honours
Women's Volleyball
Representing Turkey
FIVB Nations League
Gold medal – first place	2023 Arlington	Team
Gold medal – first place	2026 Macau	Team
Silver medal – second place	2018 Nanjing	Team
European Championship
Gold medal – first place	2026 Azerbaijan/Czech Republic/Sweden/Turkey	Team
Mediterranean Games
Bronze medal – third place	2018 Tarragona	Team
FIVB U23 World Championship
Gold medal – first place	2017 Ljubljana	Team
Junior European Championship
Bronze medal – third place	2016 Nitra	Team
European Youth Olympic Festival
Gold medal – first place	2015 Baku	Team

Saliha Şahin (born 5 November 1998) is a Turkish professional volleyball player. She is 1.86 m (6 ft 1 in) tall at 68 kg (150 lb) and plays in the Outside Hitter position of Fenerbahçe. She is a member of the Turkey women's national volleyball team.

== Club career ==
Saliha Şahin is 1.86 m (6 ft 1 in) tall at 68 kg (150 lb), and plays in the Outside Hitter position. She started her sport career in the academy of Karayolları SK in her hometown Ankara in 2015. In 2018, she transferred to the Istanbul-based Eczacıbaşı Dynavit, formerly Eczacıbaşı Vitra. She was loaned out to her former club for the 2018–19 season. In 2019, she won the Spor Toto Champions Cup with Eczacıbaşı Dynavit. She took part at the 2019 FIVB Club World Championship in Shaoxing, China, where she won the silver medal. In the 2019–20 season, she was laoned out to Sarıyer Bld. SK. She experienced her club's champion title at the 2020–21 AXA Sigorta Champions Cup. She won also the 2021–22 Women's CEV Cup. She won the bronze medal at the 2022 FIVB Volleyball Women's Club World Championship in Antalya, Turkey.

On 22 May 2023, she announced that she left Eczacıbaşı Dynavit, where she played for four years. She was loaned out to the Polish club KPS Chemik Police to play in the 2023–24 season Tauron Liga.

For the 2024-2025 season she played for Beşiktaş.

On June 2nd, Ankara based club, Zeren S.K announced the signing of Şahin for the 2025-2026 season.

Saliha is set to return to Istanbul to play for Fenerbahçe for the 2026/2027 season.

== International career ==
Saliha won the gold medal with the Turkey U-17 team at the 2015 European Youth Summer Olympic Festival in Baku, Azerbaijan.

She played for the Turkey U-19 team to play at the 2016 U19 European Championship in Nitra, Slovakia, where she took the bronze medal.

She played in the Turkey U-20 team, which placed fourth at the 2017 FIVB U20 World Championship in Mexico.

She was part of the Turkey U-23 team, which became champion at the 2017 FIVB U23 World Championship in Ljubljana, Slovenia.

Şahin became a member of the Turkey national team. She won the silver medal at the 2018 FIVB Volleyball Nations League in Nanjing, China. She played in the bronze medalist team at the 2018 Mediterranean Games in Tarragona, Spain. At the 2022 FIVB Volleyball Nations League in Ankara, Turkey, her team placed fourth. She was part of the national team, which placed eight at the 2022 FIVB World Championship in Poland and the Netherlands. She won the gold medal at the 2023 FIVB Volleyball Women's Nations League in Arlington, Texas, United States.

== Personal life ==
Saliha Şahin was born in Ankara, Turkey on 5 November 1998. She has two sisters. Her two-years younger sister Elif is also a professional volleyball player in the Setter position, they played together in Eczacıbaşı from 2020-2023.

== Honours ==
=== Club ===
==== Eczacıbaşı Dynavit ====
Turkish Women's Volleyball League
(bronze) 2021–22
(silver) 2022–23

Turkish Women's Volleyball Cup
(silver) 2020–21
(bronze) 2021–22

Turkish Women's Volleyball Super Cup
(gold) 2019, 2020
(silver) 2021–22

CEV Women's Champions League
(silver) 2022–23

FIVB Volleyball Women's Club World Championship
(silver) 2019
(bronze) 2018, 2022

Women's CEV Cup
(gold) 2021–22

=== International ===
European Youth Olympic Festival
(gold) 2015

Women's Junior European Volleyball Championship
(bronze) 2016

FIVB Volleyball Women's U23 World Championship
(gold) 2017

Mediterranean Games
(bronze) 2018

FIVB Volleyball Women's Nations League

(gold) 2023, 2026
(silver) 2018

CEV European Volleyball Championship

(gold) 2026
