= Bruna da Silva =

Brazilian volleyball player (born 1989)

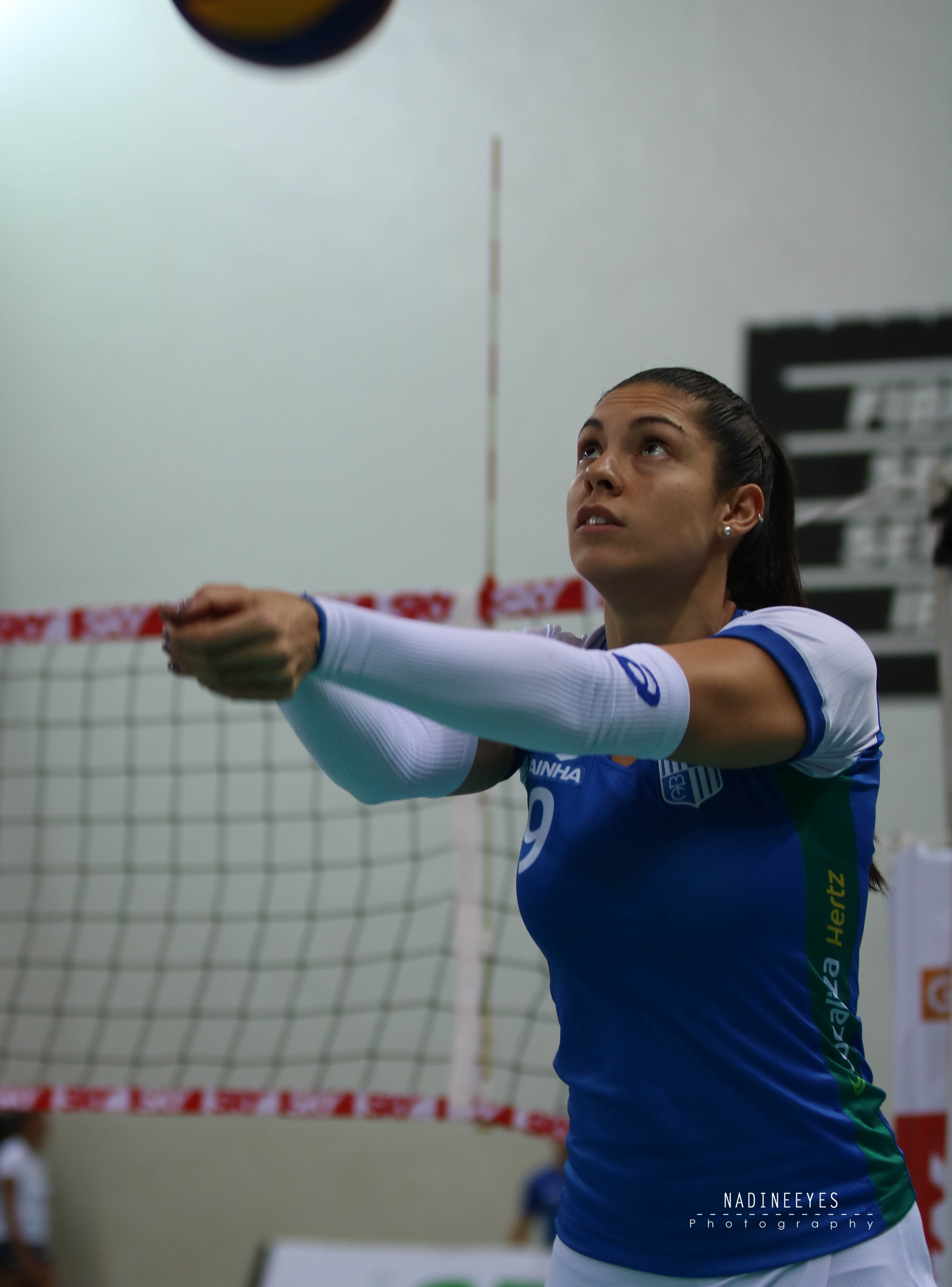

Personal information
- Full name: Bruna Honorio da Silva
- Born: 3 July 1989 (age 37); Agudos, São Paulo, Brazil
- Height: 1.81 m (5 ft 11 in)
- Weight: 80 kg (176 lb)
- Spike: 310 cm (122 in)
- Block: 292 cm (115 in)

Volleyball information
- Position: Opposite spiker
- Current club: 18
- Number: Minas Tênis Clube

National team
2018	Brazil

Bruna Honorio da Silva (born 3 July 1989) is a Brazilian female volleyball player.

With her club Unilever Vôlei she competed at the 2013 FIVB Volleyball Women's Club World Championship. With her club Rexona Ades she competed at the 2015 FIVB Volleyball Women's Club World Championship.

== Clubs ==
- (Brazil) São Bernardo Vôlei (2010–2011)
- (Brazil) E.C. Pinheiros (2011–2012)
- (Brazil) Unilever Vôlei (2012–2015)
- (Brazil) Vôlei Bauru (2015–2017)
- (Brazil) E.C. Pinheiros (2017–2018)
- (Brazil) Minas Tênis Clube (2018–2020)
- (Brazil) Minas Tênis Clube (2018–2020)
- (Poland) Radomka Radom (2020–)

== Awards ==
=== Individuals ===
- 2013 South American Club Championship – "Best blocker"
- 2017–18 Brazilian Superliga – "Best server"
- 2019 South American Club Championship – "Best opposite spiker"

=== Clubs ===
- 2012–13 Brazilian Superliga – Champion, with Unilever Vôlei
- 2013–14 Brazilian Superliga – Champion, with Rexona/Ades
- 2014–15 Brazilian Superliga – Champion, with Rexona/Ades
- 2018–19 Brazilian Superliga – Champion, with Itambé/Minas
- 2013 South American Club Championship – Champion, with Unilever Vôlei
- 2015 South American Club Championship – Champion, with Rexona/Ades
- 2019 South American Club Championship – Champion, with Itambé/Minas
- 2020 South American Club Championship – Champion, with Itambé/Minas
- 2018 Club World Championship – Runner-up, with Itambé/Minas
