= 2020 Women's South American Volleyball Club Championship =

12th official edition of the Women's South American Volleyball Club Championship

2020 Women's South American Club Championship
Tournament details
- Host country: Brazil
- Dates: 17 to 21 February
- Teams: 5
- Venue: 1 (in 1 host city)

Final positions
- Champions: (Brazil) Minas Tênis (3rd title)

Tournament awards
- MVP: (Brazil) Thaisa Menezes

The 2020 Women's South American Volleyball Club Championship was the 33th official edition of the Women's South American Volleyball Club Championship, played by five teams from February, 17 to February 21, 2020, in Uberlândia, Brazil.

Minas Tênis won its third consecutive and overall title, and qualified for the 2020 FIVB Volleyball Women's Club World Championship.

== Pools composition ==
Pool
(Argentina) Boca Juniors
(Bolivia) UC Boliviana
(Brazil) Minas Tênis
(Brazil) Praia
(Argentina) San Lorenzo

== Round-robin pool ==
- All times are Brasília Time (UTC−03:00).

Pos	Team	Pld	W	L	Pts	SW	SL	SR	SPW	SPL	SPR	Qualification
1	(Brazil) Minas Tênis	4	4	0	12	12	0	MAX	302	188	1.606	Champions and qualified for the 2020 Club World Championship
2	(Brazil) Praia	4	3	1	8	9	5	1.800	322	233	1.382	
3	(Argentina) San Lorenzo	4	2	2	6	6	6	1.000	228	252	0.905	
4	(Argentina) Boca Juniors	4	1	3	4	5	9	0.556	284	297	0.956	
5	(Bolivia) UC Boliviana	4	0	4	0	0	12	0.000	144	300	0.480	

Date	Time		Score		Set 1	Set 2	Set 3	Set 4	Set 5	Total	Report
17 Feb	19:00	Praia (Brazil)	3–0	(Bolivia) UC Boliviana	25–10	25–7	25–8			75–25	
17 Feb	20:30	Boca Juniors (Argentina)	0–3	(Argentina) San Lorenzo	23–25	18–25	20–25			61–75	
18 Feb	19:00	Praia (Brazil)	3–0	(Argentina) San Lorenzo	25–15	25–9	25–14			75–38	
18 Feb	20:30	Minas Tênis (Brazil)	3–0	(Bolivia) UC Boliviana	25–12	25–14	25–14			75–40	
19 Feb	19:00	San Lorenzo (Argentina)	3–0	(Bolivia) UC Boliviana	25–14	25–15	25–12			75–41	
19 Feb	20:30	Minas Tênis (Brazil)	3–0	(Argentina) Boca Juniors	25–17	25–12	25–16			75–45	
20 Feb	19:00	Praia (Brazil)	3–2	(Argentina) Boca Juniors	25–18	26–24	21–25	22–25	15–11	109–103	
20 Feb	21:30	Minas Tênis (Brazil)	3–0	(Argentina) San Lorenzo	25–11	25–17	25–12			75–40	
21 Feb	17:00	Boca Juniors (Argentina)	3–0	(Bolivia) UC Boliviana	25–10	25–16	25–12			75–38	
21 Feb	20:00	Minas Tênis (Brazil)	3–0	(Brazil) Praia	25–22	27–25	25–16			77–63	

== Final standing ==
Rank	Team
1st place, gold medalist(s)	(Brazil) Minas Tênis
2nd place, silver medalist(s)	(Brazil) Praia
3rd place, bronze medalist(s)	(Argentina) San Lorenzo
4	(Argentina) Boca Juniors
5	(Bolivia) UC Boliviana

Qualified for the 2020 Club World Championship

2020 Women's South American Volleyball Club Championship

Minas Tênis
3rd title

14–woman roster
Caroline Gattaz (c), Macris Carneiro, Laura Kudiess, Thaisa Menezes, Vivian Pellegrino, Lana Conceição, Bruna Silva, Luanna Emiliano, Bruna Costa, Sheilla Castro, Dobriana Rabadzhieva, Kasiely Clemente, Roslandy Acosta, Leia Silva

== All-Star team ==
The following players were chosen for the tournament's "All-Star team":

- Most valuable player
  - (Brazil) Thaisa Menezes (Minas Tênis)
- Best Opposite
  - (Dominican Republic) Brayelin Martínez (Praia)
- Best outside hitters
  - (Bulgaria) Dobriana Rabadzhieva (Minas Tênis)
  - (Argentina) Daniela Bulaich (San Lorenzo)
- Best setter
  - (Brazil) Macris Carneiro (Minas Tênis)
- Best middle blockers
  - (Brazil) Caroline Gattaz (Minas Tênis)
  - (Brazil) Ana Carolina da Silva (Praia)
- Best libero
  - (Brazil) Léia Silva (Minas Tênis)

== See also ==
- 2020 Men's South American Volleyball Club Championship
