= University Center of Belo Horizonte =

University in Belo Horizonte, Brazil

- Centro Universitário de Belo Horizonte (UniBH)
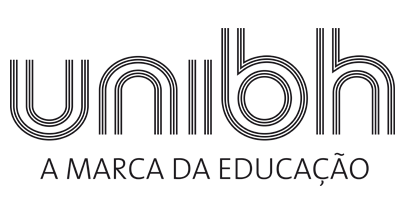
- Motto: A marca da educação
- Type: Private
- Established: March 10, 1964
- Affiliations: Anima Educação
- Rector: Rafael Luiz Ciccarini Nunes (2017-present), Vânia Amorim Café de Carvalho (2014-2017), Rivadávia Correa Drummond de Alvarenga Neto (2011-2014)
- Administrative staff: 1,532
- Students: 22,425 (2015)
- Location: Belo Horizonte, Minas Gerais, Brazil; 19.9717°S 43.9633°W
- Website: www.unibh.br

The University Center of Belo Horizonte (UniBH) (Portuguese: Centro Universitário de belo Horizonte) is a university located in the city of Belo Horizonte in the state of Minas Gerais in Brazil. It is considered the best university center in the city of Belo Horizonte and one of the best universities in Brazil, according to the Brazilian Ministry of Education (survey 2011). Acquired by pt:Anima Educação (the business alias of the publicly traded company GAEC Educação, SA (ANIM3:SA)), it is one of the strongest names in higher education in Belo Horizonte, along with UFMG and PUC Minas. UniBH is also one of the most prestigious universities in the country, due to their extension projects and their effort in bringing quality private education to those less fortunate. The UniBH also has ten courses by the starry Student Guide of Editora Abril and two courses regarded as the best in the country, Physical Education and Mathematics, according to the RUF 2012 (University Ranking of Folha de S.Paulo). UniBH was acquired in 2009 by Anima Educação.

A total of 50 academic programs offered at UniBH lead to Bachelor's of Science, Bachelor's of Arts, Master's, MBA and special Degrees in a variety of disciplines including Biomedicine, Biological Sciences, Nursing, Pharmacy, Physiotherapy, Medicine, Veterinary Medicine, Nutrition, Fashion Design, Graphic Design, Journalism, Advertising, Marketing, Communications, Public Relations, Computer Science, Aeronautic Engineering, Environmental Engineering, Civil Engineering, Chemical Engineering, Telecommunication Engineering, Geography, Geology, Environmental Management, Mechanical Engineering, Information Technology, Mining, History, Mathematics, Education, Social Service, International Relations, Law, Business Administration, Accounting, Foreign Trade, Human Resources Management, Public Administration, etc.

Noteworthy are the courses Medicine (one of the busiest of Minas Gerais), Law, Education, International Relations, Accounting, Ecology and Journalism, which has among its graduates many of the journalists working in the media mineira. Aiming to integrate teaching, research and extension, the institution maintains the TV UniBH (present on Brazilian cable TV), which has operated since 1998 showing a varied program that includes the knowledge produced by the University Center.
