= Léia Silva =

Brazilian female volleyball player (born 1985)

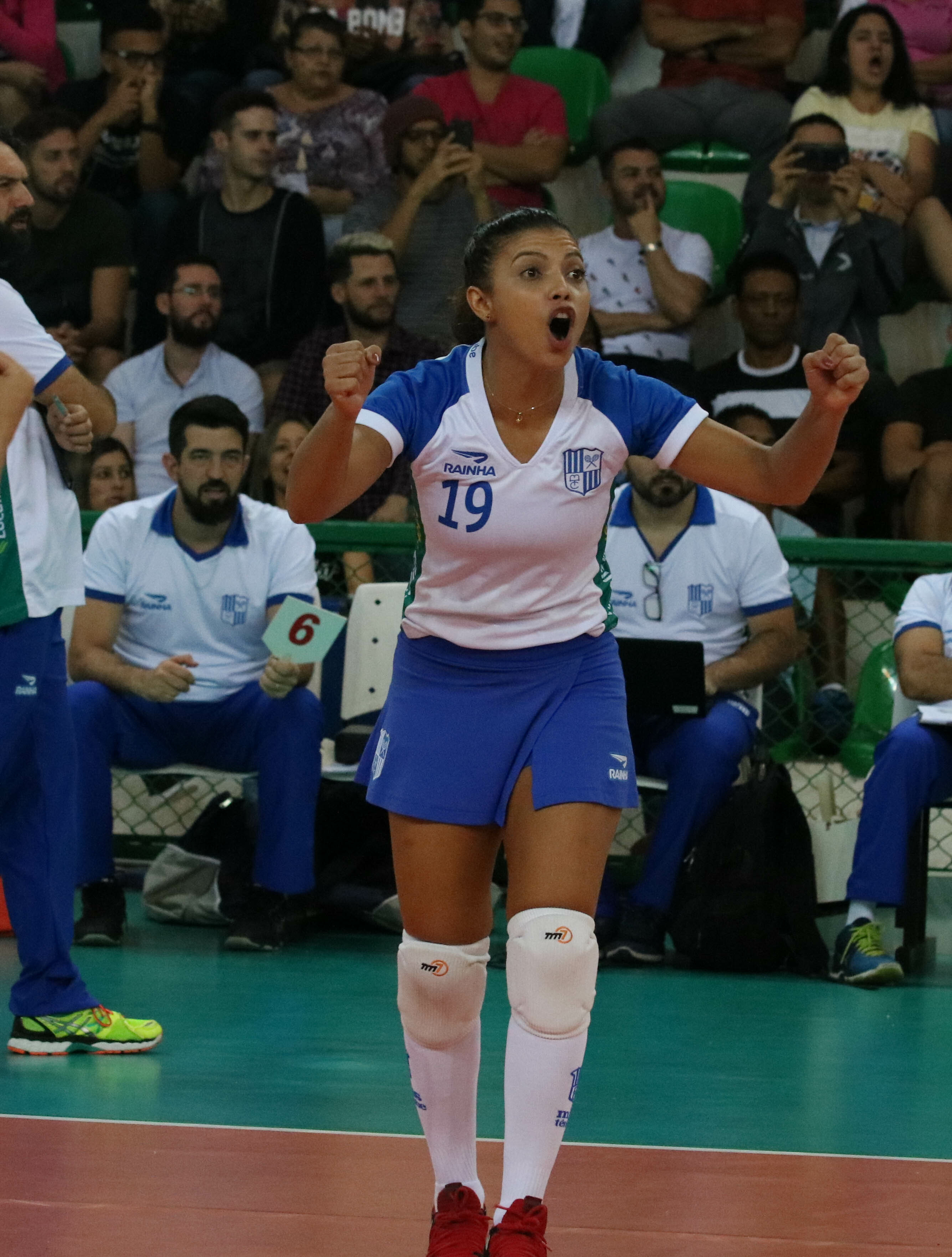

Personal information
- Full name: Léia Henrique da Silva Nicolosi
- Born: 1 March 1985 (age 41); Ibitinga, São Paulo, Brazil
- Height: 1.69 m (5 ft 7 in)
- Weight: 58 kg (128 lb)
- Spike: 268 cm (106 in)
- Block: 254 cm (100 in)

Volleyball information
- Position: Libero
- Current club: Minas Tênis Clube
- Number: 19

National team
2014–2020	Brazil
Honours
Women's volleyball
Representing Brazil
World Championship
Bronze medal – third place	2014 Italy	Team
Nations League
Silver medal – second place	2019 Nanjing	Team
World Grand Prix
Gold medal – first place	2014 Tokyo	Team
Gold medal – first place	2016 Bangkok	Team
Bronze medal – third place	2015 Omaha	Team
South American Championship
Gold medal – first place	2015 Cartagena
Gold medal – first place	2019 Cajamarca

Léia Henrique da Silva (born 1 March 1985) is a Brazilian volleyball player. She is a member of the Brazil women's national volleyball team and played for EC Pinheiros in 2014.

She was part of the Brazilian national team at the 2014 FIVB Volleyball Women's World Championship in Italy, and at the 2016 Olympic Games in Rio de Janeiro.

== Clubs ==
- (Brazil) Apiv/Piracicaba (2006)
- (Brazil) Mackenzie/Cia. do Terno (2007–2008)
- (Brazil) Medley Banespa (2008–2009)
- (Brazil) Sollys/Osasco (2010–2012)
- (Brazil) EC Pinheiros (2012–2015)
- (Brazil) Minas Tênis Clube (2015–2022)
- (Brazil) SESI Bauru (2022–)

== Awards ==
=== Individuals ===
- 2018 South American Club Championship – "Best Libero"
- 2019 South American Club Championship – "Best Libero"
- 2020 South American Club Championship – "Best Libero"

=== Clubs ===
- 2010–11 Brazilian Superliga – Runner-up, with Sollys Osasco
- 2011–12 Brazilian Superliga – Champion, with Sollys Osasco
- 2018–19 Brazilian Superliga – Champion, with Itambé Minas
- 2020–21 Brazilian Superliga – Champion, with Itambé Minas
- 2011 South American Club Championship – Champion, with Sollys Osasco
- 2018 South American Club Championship – Champion, with Camponesa Minas
- 2019 South American Club Championship – Champion, with Itambé Minas
- 2020 South American Club Championship – Champion, with Itambé Minas
- 2010 FIVB Club World Championship – Runner-up, with Sollys Osasco
- 2011 FIVB Club World Championship – Bronze medal, with Sollys Osasco
- 2018 FIVB Club World Championship – Runner-up, with Itambé Minas
