= Priscila Oliveira =

Brazilian volleyball player (born 1992)

Priscila Heldes

Personal information
- Full name: Priscila Oliveira Heldes
- Nickname: Pri Heldes
- Born: 27 March 1992 (age 34); Belo Horizonte, Minas Gerais, Brazil
- Height: 178 cm (70 in)
- Weight: 65 kg (143 lb)
- Spike: 286 cm (113 in)
- Block: 279 cm (110 in)

Volleyball information
- Position: Setter

National team
2010–2011	Brazil
Honours
Women's volleyball
Representing Brazil
U20 World Championship
Silver medal – second place	2011 Peru	Team

Priscila Oliveira Heldes (born 27 March 1992) is a Brazilian female volleyball player, playing as a setter. She was part of the Brazil women's national volleyball team.

== Clubs ==
- (Brazil) Mackenzie EC (2007–2012)
- (Brazil) Vôlei Amil/Campinas (2012–2014)
- (Brazil) Brasília Vôlei (2014–2015)
- (Brazil) SESI-São Paulo (2015–2016)
- (Brazil) Fluminense FC (2016–2017)
- (Brazil) SESI-São Paulo (2017–2018)
- (Brazil) Balneário Camboriú (2018–2019)
- (Brazil) Osasco-Audax (2019–2020)
- (Brazil) Minas Tênis Clube (2020–)

== Awards ==
=== Individuals ===
- 2010 U20 South American Championship – "Best Setter"
