= Priscila Daroit =

Brazilian volleyball player (born 1988)

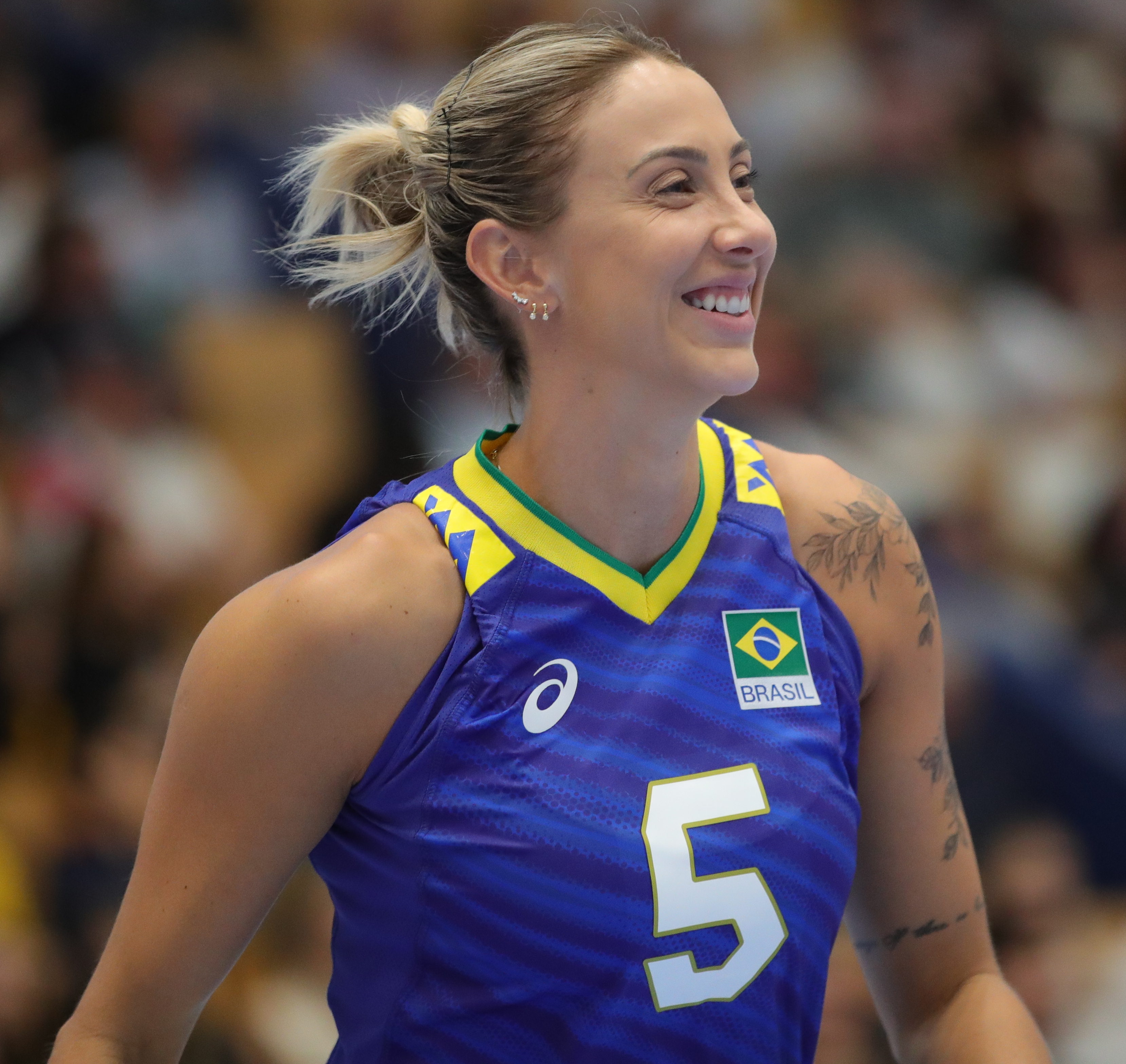
- Daroit in 2022

Personal information
- Full name: Priscila Zalewski Daroit Moreira
- Nickname: Pri Daroit
- Nationality: Brazilian
- Born: 10 August 1988 (age 38); Porto Alegre, Rio Grande do Sul
- Height: 1.82 m (6 ft 0 in)
- Weight: 74 kg (163 lb)
- Spike: 290 cm (114 in)
- Block: 280 cm (110 in)

Volleyball information
- Position: Outside spiker
- Current club: (Brazil) Minas Tênis Clube

National team
2013, 2018, 2022-	Brazil
Honours
Women's volleyball
Representing Brazil
FIVB World Championship
Silver medal – second place	2022 Poland/Netherlands	Team
Nations League
Silver medal – second place	2022 Ankara	Team
World Grand Prix
Gold medal – first place	2013 Sapporo	Team
Montreux Volley Masters
Gold medal – first place	2013 Switzerland
South American Championship
Gold medal – first place	2023 Recife	Team

Priscila Daroit (born 10 August 1988) is a Brazilian female volleyball player.

With her club SESI-SP she competed at the 2014 FIVB Volleyball Women's Club World Championship.

== Career ==
She participated at the 2018 FIVB Volleyball Women's Nations League.

== Clubs ==
- (Brazil) São Caetano (2005–2007)
- (Brazil) Minas Tênis Clube (2007–2010)
- (Brazil) Mackenzie EC (2010–2012)
- (Brazil) Vôlei Amil/Campinas (2012–2013)
- (Brazil) SESI São Paulo (2013–2015)
- (Brazil) Praia Clube (2015–2016)
- (Brazil) Minas Tênis Clube (2016–2018)
- (Brazil) Fluminense FC (2018–2019)
- (Brazil) Praia Clube (2019–2020)
- (Brazil) Minas Tênis Clube (2020–)

== Awards ==
- 2014 FIVB Club World Championship – Bronze medal, with SESI São Paulo
- 2013–14 Brazilian Superliga – Runner-up, with SESI São Paulo
- 2015–16 Brazilian Superliga – Runner-up, with Praia Clube
- 2020–21 Brazilian Superliga – Champion, with Itambé/Minas
- 2021–22 Brazilian Superliga – Champion, with Itambé/Minas
- 2022–23 Brazilian Superliga – Runner-up, with Gerdau/Minas
- 2014 South American Club Championship – Champion, with SESI São Paulo
- 2018 South American Club Championship – Champion, with Minas Tênis Clube
- 2020 South American Club Championship – Runner-Up, with Dentil/Praia Clube
