= Minas Tênis Clube =

Brazilian sports club

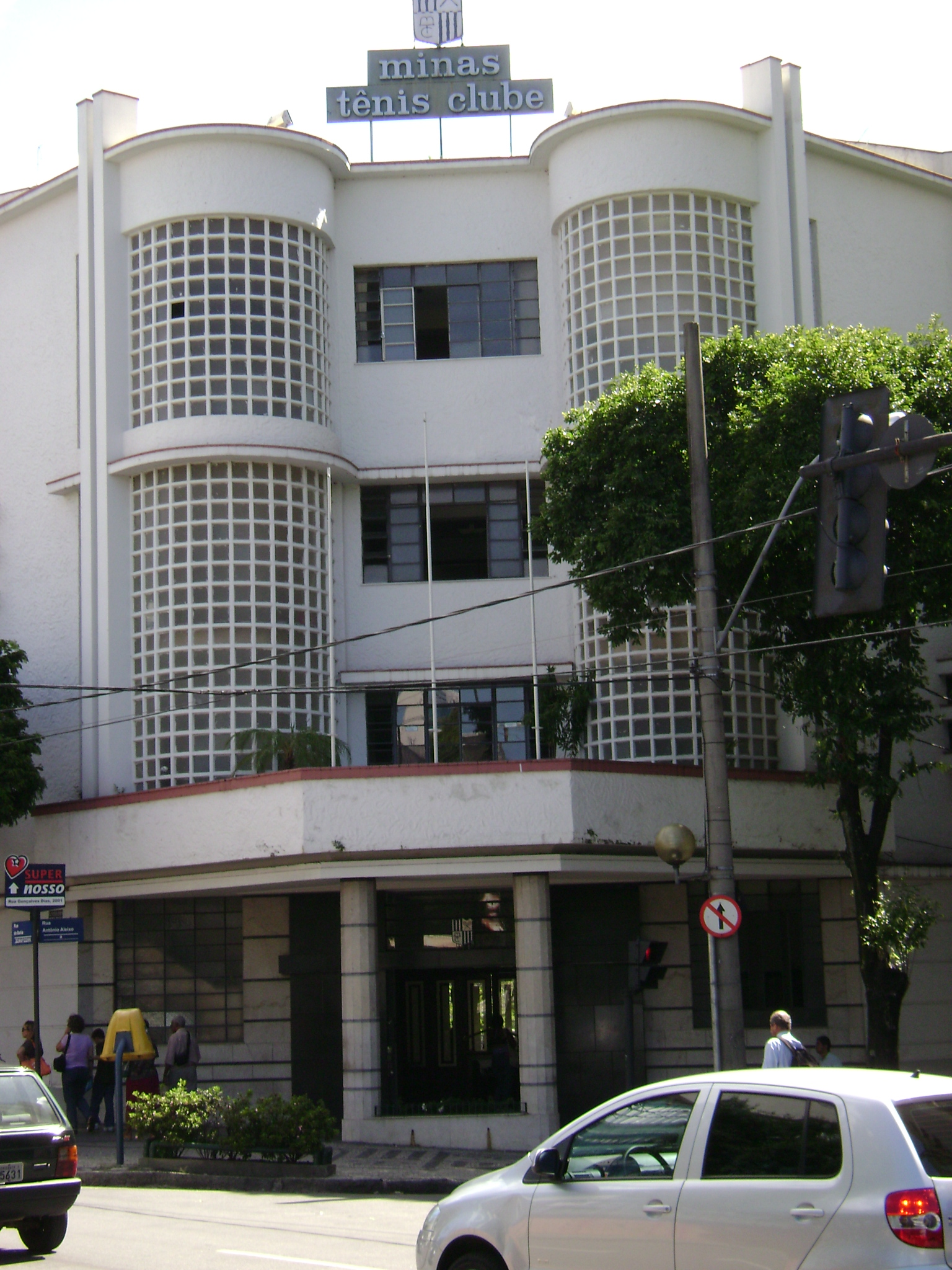
- Minas I main building
- Formation: 15 November 1935; 90 years ago
- Founder: Necésio Tavares; Waldomiro Salles Pereira; Otacílio Negrão de Lima; José Mendes Junior; Benedito Valadares
- Type: Traditional club
- Location: Belo Horizonte, Brazil
- Key people: Luiz Gustavo Lage (president)
- Website: minastenisclube.com.br

Minas Tênis Clube (short, just Minas) is a social, recreational and sports club from Belo Horizonte, Brazil. By 2013, it has more than 73,000 members. Its patrimony comprises two urban units, the Minas I and Minas II, and two country units, Minas Country and Minas Tênis Náutico Clube. It also has its own indoor arena, named Juscelino Kubitschek Arena, which is a part of the Minas I complex.

Minas is best known for the professional teams it maintains, in a variety of olympic sports. It also maintains youth teams, and is recognized to be one of the most important formation centers of new sports talents in Brazil. Currently the club has approximately 1000 competing athletes, being about 900 youth athletes.

== History ==
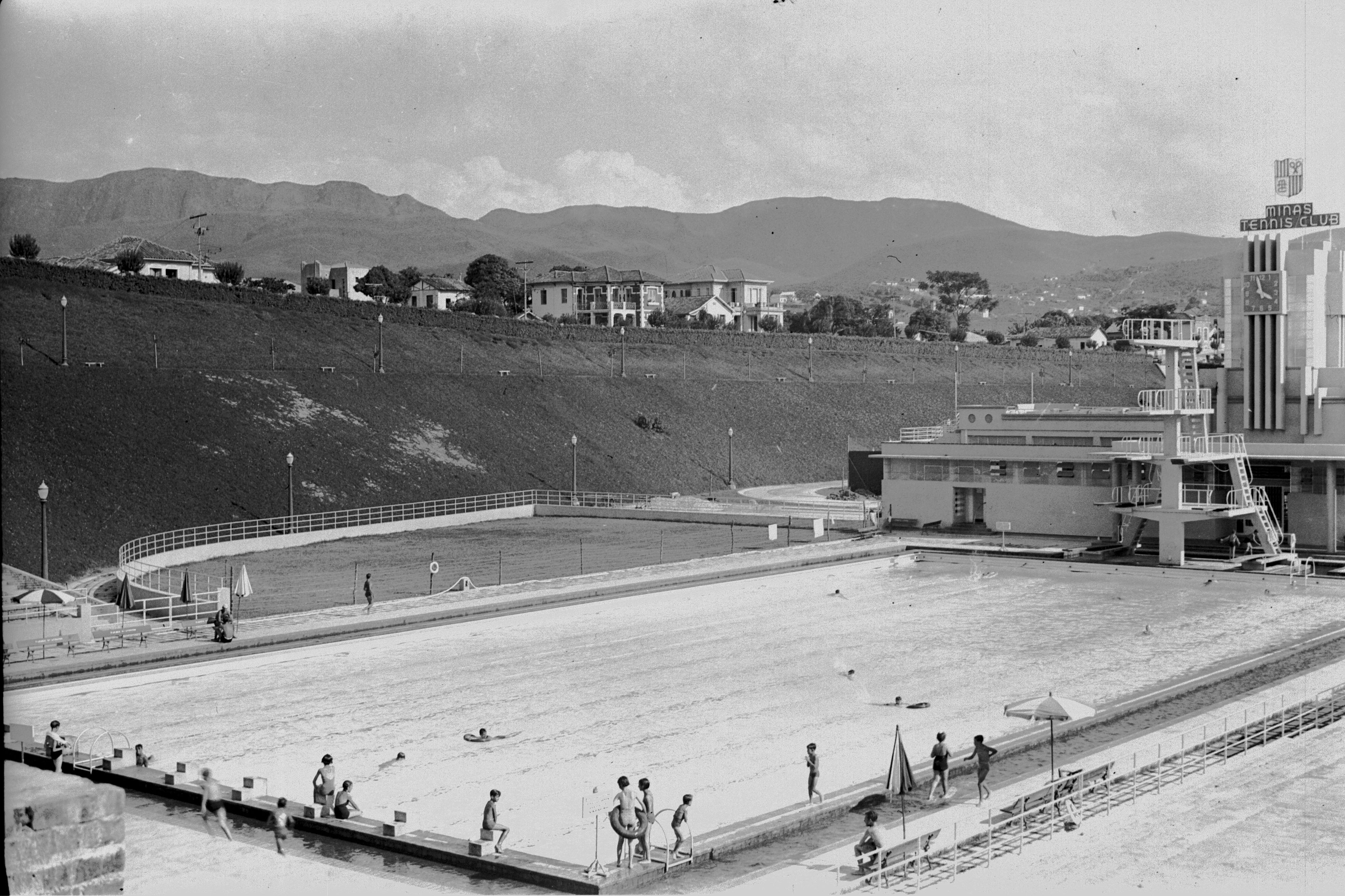
The club in 1938

The land that would become the first location of Minas Tênis Clube (currently Minas I) was originally assigned to become a zoo at Belo Horizonte's original urban plan, from the 1890s. By the beginning of the 1930s the urban growth surrounded the land with residential areas. In addition, it was very close to the Palácio da Liberdade, by then the official residence of the governor of Minas Gerais state. Thus the plan for a zoo raised environmental and hygiene concerns among the locals and the top officers of the state administration. Moreover, at the time the city had few entertainment and sports facilities. The then major Otacílio Negrão de Lima, aware of this gap, demonstrated the interest to establish a sports center to replace the original project of a zoo.

Concurrently, prominent people from the high society in Belo Horizonte planned to found a big sport club to promote the practice of sports in the city. Necésio Tavares was the leader of this movement. He had previously created a volleyball team with his own name, and started the movement to get funding and supporting to found a club named Serra. The then 23-year-old named Waldomiro Salles Pereira, whom had the intention to found a club for the practice of tennis, get to know about Necésio's initiative, and approaches him to join forces, and to found a unique new club. Together, they develop the concept of the Serra Tennis Clube.

The group, knowing the intention of the major to promote the sports in the city, asked him to donate the land to the foundation of the new club. The major agrees with the condition that the name should be changed to Minas Tênis Clube, and that the club's first president should be appointed by the then governor of the state, Benedito Valadares. All the interests were aligned, and the official act of the club's establishment was signed on November 15, 1935, in the headquarters of the Automobile Club of Minas Gerais. At the occasion, Necésio Tavares was appointed as the club's first president.

== Locations ==
Locations in Greater Belo Horizonte
1 Minas I
2 Minas II
3 Minas Country
4 Minas Náutico

The combined area of all locations is 471,000 m^{2} (approximately 108 acres).

=== Minas I ===
The Minas I complex occupies an area larger than 31,000 m^{2} (being 71,000 m^{2} constructed) in the Lourdes neighbourhood. The complex is composed by the Juscelino Kubitschek Arena, the Aquatic Park and the Sports square.

Originally, the headquarters was the only one from the club, thus a synonym of the club's name. However, since the opening of Minas II, it was naturally re-branded as Minas I (Minas One) to avoid ambiguity.

=== Minas II ===
The Minas II complex occupies an area larger than 34,000 m^{2} in Serra neighbourhood. It is composed by several sports courts, swimming pools, and the main building, which has administration facilities, and ballroom for events. The name of Minas II ("Minas Two") emerged as a natural choice since the inception, and remains until today. Moreover, caused the original headquarters to become known as Minas I ("Minas One").

In the early 80's, Minas Tênis Clube was already established as the most popular and traditional club in Belo Horizonte, and there was a high demand for its expansion. In 1982, it puts the cornerstone for the second headquarter of the club. The sports facilities were inaugurated in December 1984. In 1985, it was started the constructions of the main building, which was concluded in 1986.

Due to its large size, Minas II has been for long time the chosen venue for large events from the club. This includes the annual June Festival, but also big music concerts and sports tournaments.

=== Minas Tênis Country Clube ===
The Minas Tênis Country Clube is located in Taquaril neighborhood and occupies a total area of 285.750 m^{2}, being 148 mil m^{2} of it preserved native vegetation.

The Country Club de Belo Horizonte was a social club founded in 1933, by Alcindo Vieira. Its current main building had its construction started in 1954 and concluded on June 6, 1958. In 2000 it was incorporated by Minas, creating the Minas Tênis Country Clube. The previous members from the Country Club became automatically members from Minas Tênis Clube, thus gaining access to the other facilities.

=== Minas Tênis Náutico Clube ===
The Minas Tênis Náutico Clube is located by the Ingleses' Lake in Nova Lima, and occupies the total area of 117.000 m^{2}. The first stage of the construction occupies an area of 29.346 m^{2}. It started to be built in 1998, and concluded in March 2000.

== Artistic gymnastics ==
The club maintains a team of artistic gymnastics since 1977. Currently it competes under the name Sitran/Minas.

== Futsal ==
Minas Tênis Clube
- Full name: Minas Tênis Clube
- Nickname: Minas
- Founded: November 15, 1935 (90 years ago)
- Ground: Arena MTC, Belo Horizonte, Brazil
- Capacity: 4000
- President: Luiz Gustavo Lage
- League: Liga Futsal
- 2015: 19th
- Website: https://www.minastenisclube.com.br/esportes/futsal
Home colors	Away colors

The professional futsal men's team plays for the Brazilian league.

=== Honours ===
==== International ====
- South American Championship - Southern Zone
  - Runners-up: 2013

==== National ====
- Brazilian Cup:
  - Champions: 2002, 2012
- Brazilian league:
  - Runners-up: 2002
- Superliga de Futsal:
  - Runners-up: 2010
- Southeastern League:
  - Champions: 2009, 2010
  - Runners-up: 2006, 2011

==== Regional ====
- Belo Horizonte Metropolitan Championship:
  - Champions: 2001, 2002, 2004, 2005, 2006, 2007, 2008, 2009, 2010, 2011, 2012, 2013
- Minas Gerais State Championship:
  - Champions: 2002, 2004, 2005, 2006, 2007, 2008, 2009, 2010, 2011, 2012

Squads history
As of 23 May 2019

Team roster - season 2019
#	Position	Name	Nationality
1	Goalkeeper	Anderson Silva	(Brazil)
2	Winger	Gustavo Araújo	(Brazil)
3	Goalkeeper	Lucas Cardoso	(Brazil)
6	Pivot	Kauê Gaúcho	(Brazil)
7	Winger	Dudu Santos	(Brazil)
8	Defender	Gabriel Ferro	(Brazil)
9	Pivot	Renato Ramba	(Brazil)
10	Defender	Luís Dizotti	(Brazil)
11	Winger	Felipe Santos	(Brazil)
13	Winger	Lion de Souza	(Brazil)
14	Pivot	Maico Monteiro	(Brazil)
15	Winger	Renatinho	(Brazil)
17	Defender	Vítor Nascimento	(Brazil)
19	Pivot	Maicon Douglas	(Brazil)
20	Goalkeeper	Françoar Rodrigues	(Brazil)
21	Goalkeeper	Mateus Espírito Santo	(Brazil)
22	Winger	Vitinho	(Brazil)
33	Defender	João Pedro	(Brazil)
93	Winger	Henrique Souza	(Brazil)
96	Winger	Josué Oliveira	(Brazil)
99	Winger	Leo Fernandes	(Brazil)

== Judo ==
The club maintain an olympic judo team, which currently disputes under the name Belo Dente/Minas. Among the most successful athletes are Luciano Corrêa, Ketleyn Quadros and Érika Miranda.

== Swimming ==
Minas

Club information
- City: Belo Horizonte
- Parent body: Minas Tênis Clube
- Founded: November 15, 1935; 90 years ago
- Home pool: Minas I Aquatic Complex
- Chairman: Luiz Gustavo Lage

Swimming
- Name: Fiat/Minas
- Head coach: Sérgio Marques
- Swim cap design: Hammerhead
- League: Maria Lenk Trophy (ML); José Finkel Trophy (JF)
- ML 2019 JF 2019: 2nd 1st

The professional swimming team is one of the most successful in Brazil. It is currently runners-up and champion of the two most prestigious national competitions, respectively: the Maria Lenk and José Finkel trophies. Currently the swimming team competes with the name Fiat/Minas, repeating the same name and sponsorship from the men's volleyball team in the late 80's.

Among the most famous swimmers that have competed for the team, there are Kaio Márcio de Almeida, Joanna Maranhão, Thiago Pereira, Marcus Mattioli, Rogério Romero and the Olympic champion César Cielo.

=== History ===
Swimming is practiced in Minas since its inception. At the Maria Lenk Trophy, the club finished in second place, with 1990.5 points. The team highlights were the victory of César Cielo in the 100-metre freestyle, with 48.13. Nicolas Oliveira was 4th (49.12) and Marco Antonio Macedo was the eighth (50:25).

At the José Finkel Trophy, the team finished 1st, with 2945 points and 19 golds, 13 silver and 11 bronzes (total: 44). It was the fourth victory of Minas in a row. The highlight was the victory of Miguel Valente in 800-metre freestyle, with 7'44.84, being the best time of the world in 2014 until then.

Minas started the Maria Lenk trophy as the team to be beaten, given its renowned swimmers. The club lead the competition until the last day, when it was surpassed by Pinheiros with the tight different of 5 points. Minas finished the competition in second place, with 2,133. One of the highlights was the gold of Thiago Pereira at the 400-metre medley, with 4'13.94. The result qualified him for the FINA World Championship, in Kazan.

In August Minas won the José Finkel Trophy, in a close dispute with the host team Pinheiros. It was the club's fifth victory in a row, in a total of 11 championships.

=== Honors ===
- Maria Lenk Trophy / Brazilian Summer Trophy (long course):
  - Champions: 1988, 1990, 1992, 1994, 1994, 1996, 1997, 2011, 2013 (9)
- José Finkel Trophy / Brazilian Winter Trophy (short course):
  - Champions: 1988, 1991, 1993, 1994, 1996, 1998, 2011, 2012, 2013, 2014, 2015, 2019 (12)

== Tennis ==
The club maintains a tennis team, which competes under the name Cultura Inglesa/Minas.

== Trampolining ==
The club maintains a trampolining team since 1999. Currently it competes under the name BH Shopping/Minas.

== Volleyball - Men ==
Fiat/Minas
- Full name: Minas Tênis Clube
- Short name: Minas
- Founded: 1937
- Ground: Arena Minas Tênis Clube, Belo Horizonte (Capacity: 3,650)
- Chairman: Luiz Gustavo Lage
- Manager: Nery Tambeiro
- League: Superliga Brasileira de Voleibol
- 2024/25: 4th place
- Website: Club home page

Uniforms
Home	Away

The men's professional volleyball team plays at the Superliga Brasileira de Voleibol. It is the most successful professional Brazilian team, with a record of nine national titles.

=== History ===
The first volleyball teams from Minas Tênis Club were formed in 1937.

In the decade of 1980 the volleyball gained major attendance in Brazil. The first national professional championship was organized in 1981. Also, the decade was the era of so-called "silver generation", in a reference to the team that won the silver medal in men's volleyball in the Olympic games of Los Angeles. The team, at time sponsored by the Italian car manufactured Fiat, was the major power of the Brazilian volleyball. The team led by the Korean coach Young Wan Sohn won three titles in a row. At that time it created a major rivalry with two other teams from São Paulo state: Banespa and Pirelli.

During the 1990s the team had major success, winning three titles in a row. The team was named after Telemig Celular, a former mobile carrier. It was acquired by Vivo, which continued the sponsorship until today.

=== Honors ===
Minas Tenis Clube is the most successful team in the history of Brazilian Men's volleyball. They have a record of nine national titles.

- South-American Championship:
  - Champions: 1984, 1985, 1999
  - Runners-up: 2013, 2022
- Guarani Trophy of Champion Clubs
  - Champions: 1963
- Brazilian Championship of Champion Clubs
  - Champions: 1964
- Brazilian Championship:
  - Champions: 1984, 1985, 1986
- Brazilian League:
  - Runners-up: 1988–89
- Brazilian Superleague
  - Champions: 1999–00, 2000–01, 2001–02, 2006–07
  - Runners-up: 2004–05, 2005–06, 2008–09
- Minas Gerais state championship:
  - Champions: 1970, 1971, 1972, 1973, 1976, 1977, 1978, 1979, 1984, 1985, 1998, 1999, 2000, 2001, 2002, 2003, 2004, 2005, 2006, 2007, 2019
  - Runners-up: 2008, 2009, 2010, 2011, 2012, 2013, 2015
- São Paulo state championship (representing Esporte Clube Pinheiros):
  - Champions: 2005, 2006
  - Runners-up: 2007, 2008

Squads history

Team roster - season 2019/2020
Fiat/Minas
No.	Name	Date of birth	Position
1	(Brazil) Rodrigo Rodrigues (c)	February 13, 1986 (age 40)	setter
2	(Argentina) Nicolás Lazo	April 16, 1995 (age 31)	outside hitter
3	(Brazil) Davy Moraes	April 7, 1997 (age 29)	opposite
4	(Brazil) Bernardo Westermann	March 13, 1998 (age 28)	setter
6	(Brazil) André Saliba	August 27, 1999 (age 27)	opposite
7	(Brazil) Henrique Honorato	March 18, 1997 (age 29)	outside hitter
8	(Brazil) Lucas Figueiredo	April 20, 1999 (age 27)	outside hitter
9	(Brazil) Deivid Costa	April 26, 1988 (age 38)	middle blocker
10	(Brazil) Matheus Santos	April 23, 1996 (age 30)	middle blocker
11	(Brazil) Feliie Lourença	August 25, 1990 (age 36)	libero
12	(Brazil) Matheus Cunda	January 12, 1991 (age 35)	middle blocker
14	(Argentina) Lucas Ocampo	March 20, 1986 (age 40)	opposite
15	(Brazil) Maique Nascimento	January 16, 1997 (age 29)	libero
16	(Brazil) João Franck	March 9, 1999 (age 27)	outside hitter
18	(Brazil) Felipe Roque	May 19, 1997 (age 29)	opposite
19	(Brazil) Edson Paixão	March 29, 2000 (age 26)	middle blocker
20	(Brazil) Marcus Coelho	September 29, 2000 (age 26)	outside hitter

Team roster - season 2018/2019
Fiat/Minas
No.	Name	Date of birth	Position
2	(Cuba) Luis Mazorra	March 10, 2000 (age 26)	outside hitter
3	(Brazil) Davy Moraes	April 7, 1997 (age 29)	opposite
4	(Brazil) Marlon Yared (c)	July 27, 1977 (age 49)	setter
5	(Brazil) Lucca Vieira	June 13, 1999 (age 27)	opposite
6	(Brazil) Mateus Pereira	January 31, 1998 (age 28)	setter
7	(Brazil) Henrique Honorato	March 18, 1997 (age 29)	outside hitter
8	(Brazil) Eduardo Sobrinho	January 19, 1996 (age 30)	setter
9	(Brazil) Lucas Figueiredo	April 20, 1999 (age 27)	outside hitter
10	(Brazil) Matheus Santos	April 23, 1996 (age 30)	middle blocker
11	(Brazil) Robinson Dvoranen	December 23, 1983 (age 42)	outside hitter
12	(Brazil) Rogério Filho	February 20, 1995 (age 31)	libero
13	(Brazil) Flávio Gualberto	April 22, 1993 (age 33)	middle blocker
14	(Brazil) Rafael Martins	February 10, 1991 (age 35)	middle blocker
15	(Brazil) Maique Nascimento	January 16, 1997 (age 29)	libero
16	(Brazil) João Franck	March 9, 1999 (age 27)	outside hitter
17	(Brazil) Cledenilson Batista	June 9, 1998 (age 28)	middle blocker
18	(Brazil) Felipe Roque	May 19, 1997 (age 29)	opposite
19	(Brazil) Edson Paixão	March 29, 2000 (age 26)	middle blocker
20	(Brazil) Silmar Almeida	October 6, 1986 (age 40)	outside hitter

== Volleyball - Women ==
Gerdau/Minas
- Full name: Minas Tênis Clube
- Short name: Minas
- Founded: 1935
- Ground: Arena Minas Tênis Clube, Belo Horizonte (Capacity: 5,000)
- Chairman: (Brazil) Ricardo Vieira Santiago
- Manager: (Italy) Lorenzo Pintus
- Captain: (Brazil) Thaisa Daher
- League: Brazilian Superliga
- 2022-23: 2nd
- Website: Club home page

Uniforms
Home	Away

The women's volleyball team plays at the Brazilian Superleague and the Minas Gerais state league. By 2020 it disputed under the name Itambé/Minas.

=== History ===
Volleyball has been practiced in Minas since its opening, in 1937. During the early 1990s, Minas was one of the most successful teams in Brazil. The team was second place in the 1991–92, and won the 1992–93 Brazilian League. The main players were Hilma, Ana Paula, Leila and Ana Flávia, whom also played for the Brazil women's national volleyball team.

From late 1990s until the season 2010/2011 the team played with the name MRV/Minas. During this period the team had noticeable performance, winning its second Brazilian Superleague championship, and also being runner-up twice.

During the seasons 2011/2012 and 2012/2013 the team played under the name Usiminas/Minas. The team achieved fourth and seventh positions, respectively, in the Brazilian Superliga.

In April 2013 Usiminas announced that it would not renew the partnership. The team did not signed with any other sponsor and will play the season 2013/2014 without sponsorship, using the club's original name. In the beginning of 2014 the team signed the contract, and changed its commercial name to Decisão Engenharia/Minas. For the season 2014/2015 the team started playing under the name Camponesa/Minas. After a poor start to the season, losing the first six matches, the team signed olympic champion wing-spiker Jaqueline Carvalho, who was a free agent after missing the entire previous season due to her pregnancy, led by her, the team quickly turned its fortunes around, finishing 5th in the regular season and making to the semifinals, where they lost to Rexona-Ades. In 2015–16, despite Jaqueline's departure to SESI-SP, the team had its best season since the MRV years, finishing 3rd in the regular season, once again losing in the semifinals, this time to intrastate rival Dentil/Praia Clube.

For the 2016–17 season, the team signed American opposite Destinee Hooker on a prove-it deal. Without her to start the season, however, the team was very inconsistent, sitting at a 3–4 record after the first 7 games. During that span, the team signed Jaqueline once again in the free agency, after she found herself without a team for months following the end of the 2015–16 season. Hooker finally debuted in a 3–2 win over Fluminense in the following game, Jaqueline debuted later during midseason. Anchored by Hooker, aided by Jaqueline and also counting on a breakout years from young players like wing-spiker Rosamaria and middle-blocker Mara, the team proceeded to win 12 of the 15 final games (including a 9-game win streak), finishing 4th in the final regular season standings. Once again, Minas found themselves defeated in the semifinals, in a thrilling 5-game series against Rexona-Sesc. Despite missing the first 7 games, Hooker finished as the 2nd highest scorer in the tournament with 404 points, beating teammate Rosamaria (who scored 403 herself) and only behind Vôlei Nestlé's Tandara Caixeta. Hooker also finished the tournament as the most efficient spiker, making the Superliga team of the year. Mara also made it, as she finished 3rd in blocks but was also the most efficient blocker of the tournament on a per play basis.

In the 2018–19 season, Italian head coach Stefano Lavarini lead the team to another Superliga title. In 2021, coach Negro, another Italian, accomplished the same. Just like Lavarini, coach Negro beat Praia Clube in the final series 2–1. Under coach Negro, Minas won the South American Championship in 2020, in October of the same year the Mineiro Championship (of the state of Minas Gerais), then in 2021 the Brazilian Cup. Minas closed the season with 34 wins out of 37 games.

=== Honors ===
==== International ====
- World Championship:
  - Runners-up: 1992, 2018
- South American Championship:
  - Champions: 1999, 2000, 2018, 2019, 2020, 2022, 2024
- Salonpas Cup:
  - Runners-up: 2002** Third place: 2004, 2007

==== National ====
- Brazilian Championship of Champion Clubs / Guarani Trophy:
  - Champions: 1963, 1964
  - Runners-up: 1962
- Brazilian Trophy:
  - Champions: 1974
- Brazilian Championship:
  - Runners-up: 1978, 1981
- Brazilian League:
  - Champions: 1992/93
  - Runners-up: 1991/92
- Brazilian Superleague:
  - Champions: 2001/02, 2018/19, 2020/21, 2021/22, 2023/24
  - Runners-up: 1999/00, 2002/03, 2003/04
  - Third place: 2006/07
- Brazilian Cup:
  - Champions: 1983, 1997, 2019, 2021, 2023
  - Runners-up: 2017

==== Regional ====
- Minas Gerais state championship:
  - Champions: 1940, 1946, 1949, 2003, 2019, 2020, 2022, 2024
  - Runners-up: 2010, 2013, 2023
- São Paulo state championship:
  - Third place: 2002, 2003, 2004, 2006

=== Squad ===
2025-2026 squad - As of September 2025

Head coach: (Italy) Lorenzo Pintus

Team roster - season 2025–2026
Number	Player	Position	Height (m)	Birth date
1	(Brazil) Francine Tomazoni	Setter	1.81	November 5, 1991 (age 34)
2	(Poland) Julia Nowicka	Setter	1.74	October 21, 1998 (age 28)
11	(Brazil) Amanda Marques	Opposite	1.85	March 23, 1999 (age 27)
13	(Russia) Maria Khaletskaya	Opposite	1.95	July 31, 1994 (age 32)
5	(Brazil) Priscila Daroit	Outside hitter	1.86	August 10, 1988 (age 38)
16	(Brazil) Glayce Vasconcelos	Outside hitter	1.87	January 28, 1998 (age 28)
18	(Brazil) Ana Luiza Rüdiger	Outside hitter	1.86	January 2, 2003 (age 23)
3	(Brazil) Giovana Guimarães	Middle blocker	1.92	October 18, 2007 (age 19)
6	(Brazil) Thaisa Daher	Middle blocker	1.96	May 15, 1987 (age 39)
8	(Brazil) Júlia Kudiess	Middle blocker	1.90	January 2, 2003 (age 23)
17	(Brazil) Júlia Koehler	Middle blocker	1.88	April 15, 1999 (age 27)
7	(Brazil) Nyeme Costa	Libero	1.75	October 11, 1998 (age 28)
12	(Brazil) Larissa Fortes	Libero	1.71	August 16, 2004 (age 22)

Team roster - season 2021–2022
Number	Player	Position	Height (m)	Birth date
1	(Brazil) Jaqueline Schimitz	Outside hitter	1.85	November 2, 2003 (age 23)
2	(Brazil) Caroline Gattaz (c)	Middle blocker	1.92	July 27, 1981 (age 45)
3	(Brazil) Macris Carneiro	Setter	1.78	May 3, 1989 (age 37)
5	(Brazil) Priscila Daroit	Outside hitter	1.83	February 25, 2001 (age 25)
6	(Brazil) Thaísa Menezes	Middle blocker	1.96	May 15, 1987 (age 39)
7	(Brazil) Ana Vitória Silva	Middle blocker	1.92	June 18, 2003 (age 23)
8	(Brazil) Júlia Kudiess	Middle blocker	1.89	January 2, 2003 (age 23)
9	(Brazil) Kisy Nascimento	Opposite	1.90	January 2, 2000 (age 26)
10	(Brazil) Júlia Moreira	Libero	1.63	January 10, 1999 (age 27)
11	(Brazil) Priscila Heldes	Setter	1.78	March 27, 1992 (age 34)
13	(Turkey) Neriman Ozsoy	Outside hitter	1.90	July 13, 1988 (age 38)
14	(Brazil) Luiza Vicente	Outside hitter	1.85	June 22, 2004 (age 22)
16	(Brazil) Priscila Souza	Outside hitter	1.83	October 29, 1987 (age 39)
18	(Brazil) Rebeca Silva	Middle blocker	1.97	April 21, 2004 (age 22)
19	(Brazil) Léia Silva	Libero	1.60	March 1, 1985 (age 41)
20	(United States) Danielle Cuttino	Opposite	1.94	June 22, 1996 (age 30)

Team roster - season 2020–2021
Number	Player	Position	Height (m)	Birth date
1	(Brazil) Lara Nobre	Middle blocker	1.85	February 11, 1989 (age 37)
2	(Brazil) Caroline Gattaz (c)	Middle blocker	1.92	July 27, 1981 (age 45)
3	(Brazil) Macris Carneiro	Setter	1.78	May 3, 1989 (age 37)
5	(Brazil) Priscila Daroit	Outside hitter	1.83	February 25, 2001 (age 25)
6	(Brazil) Thaísa Menezes	Middle blocker	1.96	May 15, 1987 (age 39)
7	(Brazil) Luanna Emiliano	Libero	1.69	February 26, 2002 (age 24)
8	(Brazil) Júlia Kudiess	Middle blocker	1.89	January 2, 2003 (age 23)
10	(Brazil) Priscila Heldes	Setter	1.78	March 27, 1992 (age 34)
11	(United States) Megan Hodge	Outside hitter	1.88	October 15, 1988 (age 38)
12	(Brazil) Camila Mesquita	Opposite	1.81	February 27, 2000 (age 26)
14	(Brazil) Luiza Vicente	Outside hitter	1.85	June 22, 2004 (age 22)
17	(Brazil) Kasiely Clemente	Outside hitter	1.82	December 6, 1993 (age 32)
19	(Brazil) Léia Silva	Libero	1.68	March 1, 1985 (age 41)
20	(United States) Danielle Cuttino	Opposite	1.94	June 22, 1996 (age 30)

Team roster - season 2019–2020
Number	Player	Position	Height (m)	Birth date
2	(Brazil) Caroline Gattaz (c)	Middle blocker	1.92	July 27, 1981 (age 45)
3	(Brazil) Macris Carneiro	Setter	1.78	May 3, 1989 (age 37)
5	(Brazil) Laura Kudiess	Middle blocker	1.88	February 25, 2001 (age 25)
6	(Brazil) Thaísa Menezes	Middle blocker	1.96	May 15, 1987 (age 39)
7	(Brazil) Vivian Pellegrino	Middle blocker	1.80	May 31, 1985 (age 41)
8	(Brazil) Lana Conceição	Outside hitter	1.78	December 8, 1996 (age 29)
9	(Brazil) Bruna Silva	Opposite	1.81	July 3, 1989 (age 37)
12	(Brazil) Bruna Rocha Costa	Setter	1.70	January 30, 1995 (age 31)
13	(Brazil) Sheilla Castro	Opposite	1.85	July 1, 1983 (age 43)
15	(Bulgaria) Dobriana Rabadzhieva	Outside hitter	1.90	June 14, 1991 (age 35)
17	(Brazil) Kasiely Clemente	Outside hitter	1.82	December 6, 1993 (age 32)
18	(Venezuela) Roslandy Acosta	Outside hitter	1.90	February 25, 1992 (age 34)
19	(Brazil) Léia Silva	Libero	1.68	March 1, 1985 (age 41)

Team roster - season 2018–2019
Number	Player	Position	Height (m)	Birth date
1	(Brazil) Mara Leão	Middle Blocker	1.90	July 26, 1991 (age 35)
2	(Brazil) Caroline Gattaz (c)	Middle Blocker	1.92	July 27, 1981 (age 45)
3	(Brazil) Macris Carneiro	Setter	1.78	May 3, 1989 (age 37)
4	(Brazil) Maria Cecília de Paula	Middle Blocker	1.80	August 11, 1999 (age 27)
6	(Brazil) Lana Conceição	Outside Hitter	1.78	December 8, 1996 (age 29)
7	(Brazil) Maria Luísa Oliveira	Opposite	1.82	December 12, 1992 (age 33)
9	(Brazil) Bruna da Silva	Opposite	1.81	July 3, 1989 (age 37)
10	(Brazil) Gabriela Guimarães	Outside Hitter	1.80	May 19, 1994 (age 32)
11	(Brazil) Luiza Vicente da Silva	Middle Blocker	1.84	June 22, 2004 (age 22)
12	(Brazil) Natália Pereira	Outside Hitter	1.86	April 4, 1989 (age 37)
14	(Brazil) Laura Kudiess	Middle Blocker	1.88	February 25, 2001 (age 25)
15	(Brazil) Georgia Cattani	Libero	1.62	March 9, 1997 (age 29)
16	(Brazil) Monique de Jesus	Opposite	1.82	August 27, 2001 (age 25)
18	(Brazil) Mayany de Souza	Middle Blocker	1.85	November 24, 1996 (age 29)
19	(Brazil) Léia Silva	Libero	1.68	March 1, 1985 (age 41)
20	(Brazil) Bruna Rocha Costa	Setter	1.70	January 30, 1995 (age 31)

Team roster - season 2017–2018
Number	Player	Position	Height (m)	Birth date
1	(Brazil) Mara Leão	Middle Blocker	1.90	July 26, 1991 (age 35)
2	(Brazil) Caroline Gattaz (c)	Middle Blocker	1.92	July 27, 1981 (age 45)
3	(Brazil) Macris Carneiro	Setter	1.78	May 3, 1989 (age 37)
4	(Brazil) Kaoane Loch	Middle Blocker	1.95	January 28, 1998 (age 28)
5	(Brazil) Laiza Ferreira	Opposite	1.81	February 18, 1996 (age 30)
6	(Brazil) Luana Gonçalves	Setter	1.80	July 26, 1998 (age 28)
7	(Brazil) Karine Guerra	Setter	1.76	February 25, 1979 (age 47)
8	(Brazil) Priscila Daroit	Outside Hitter	1.83	August 10, 1988 (age 38)
9	(Brazil) Rosamaria Montibeller	Outside Hitter	1.85	April 9, 1994 (age 32)
10	(United States) Sonja Newcombe	Outside Hitter	1.82	March 7, 1988 (age 38)
11	(Brazil) Natália Monteiro	Outside Hitter	1.80	March 1, 1997 (age 29)
12	(United States) Destinee Hooker	Opposite	1.90	September 7, 1987 (age 39)
15	(Brazil) Georgia Cattani	Libero	1.63	align=right|March 9, 1997 (age 29)
16	(Brazil) Karoline Tormena	Outside Hitter	1.89	March 21, 1996 (age 30)
18	(Brazil) Mayany de Souza	Middle Blocker	1.85	November 24, 1996 (age 29)
19	(Brazil) Léia Silva	Libero	1.68	March 1, 1985 (age 41)

Team roster - season 2016–2017
Number	Player	Position	Height (m)	Birth date
1	(Brazil) Mara Leão	Middle Blocker	1.90	July 26, 1991 (age 35)
2	(Brazil) Caroline Gattaz (c)	Middle Blocker	1.92	July 27, 1981 (age 45)
3	(Brazil) Naiane Rios	Setter	1.80	November 29, 1994 (age 31)
4	(Brazil) Karine Guerra	Setter	1.76	February 25, 1979 (age 47)
6	(Brazil) Maria Clara Almeida	Setter	1.78	June 9, 1996 (age 30)
7	(Brazil) Priscila Daroit	Outside Hitter	1.83	August 10, 1988 (age 38)
8	(Brazil) Jaqueline Carvalho	Outside Hitter	1.86	December 31, 1983 (age 42)
9	(Brazil) Rosamaria Montibeller	Outside Hitter	1.85	April 9, 1994 (age 32)
10	(Brazil) Maiara Basso	Oitside Hitter	1.87	January 3, 1996 (age 30)
11	(Brazil) Renata Maggioni	Middle Blocker	1.90	April 21, 1988 (age 38)
12	(United States) Destinee Hooker	Opposite	1.90	September 7, 1987 (age 39)
13	(Brazil) Francynne Jacintho	Middle Blocker	1.88	July 16, 1992 (age 34)
14	(Brazil) Mayany de Souza	Middle Blocker	1.85	November 24, 1996 (age 29)
15	(Brazil) Georgia Cattani	Libero	1.62	March 9, 1997 (age 29)
16	(Brazil) Karoline Tormena	Outside Hitter	1.89	March 21, 1996 (age 30)
17	(Brazil) Natália Monteiro	Outside Hitter	1.80	March 1, 1997 (age 29)
18	(Brazil) Domingas Araújo	Outside Hitter	1.84	September 9, 1994 (age 32)
19	(Brazil) Léia Silva	Libero	1.68	March 1, 1985 (age 41)

Team roster - season 2015–2016
Number	Player	Position	Height (m)	Birth date
1	(Brazil) Mara Leão	Middle Blocker	1.90	July 26, 1991 (age 35)
2	(Brazil) Caroline Gattaz (c)	Middle Blocker	1.92	July 27, 1981 (age 45)
3	(Brazil) Naiane Rios	Setter	1.80	November 29, 1994 (age 31)
4	(Brazil) Samara Almeida	Outside Hitter	1.84	July 16, 1992 (age 34)
6	(Brazil) Maria Clara Almeida	Setter	1.78	June 9, 1996 (age 30)
7	(Brazil) Marcela Correa	Setter	1.78	December 1, 1987 (age 38)
8	(Brazil) Karoline Tormena	Outside Hitter	1.89	March 21, 1996 (age 30)
9	(Brazil) Rosamaria Montibeller	Outside Hitter	1.85	April 9, 1994 (age 32)
10	(Brazil) Maiara Basso	Oitside Hitter	1.87	January 3, 1996 (age 30)
11	(Brazil) Valquíria Dullius	Middle Blocker	1.90	August 19, 1994 (age 32)
12	(Brazil) Laís Vasques	Libero	1.72	February 12, 1996 (age 30)
13	(Brazil) Carla Santos	Outside Hitter	1.73	January 17, 1992 (age 34)
15	(Brazil) Mariana Costa	Outside Hitter	1.80	June 30, 1986 (age 40)
16	(Brazil) Tandara Caixeta	Opposite	1.84	October 30, 1988 (age 38)
15	(Brazil) Georgia Cattani	Libero	1.62	March 9, 1997 (age 29)
19	(Brazil) Léia Silva	Libero	1.68	March 1, 1985 (age 41)

Team roster - season 2014–2015
Number	Player	Position	Height (m)	Birth date
1	(Brazil) Walewska Oliveira	Middle Blocker	1.90	October 1, 1979 (age 47)
2	(Brazil) Caroline Gattaz (c)	Middle Blocker	1.92	July 27, 1981 (age 45)
3	(Brazil) Naiane Rios	Setter	1.80	November 29, 1994 (age 31)
4	(Brazil) Emilia Oliveira	Middle Blocker	1.86	August 7, 1992 (age 34)
5	(Brazil) Elaine Santos	Libero	1.70	January 24, 1988 (age 38)
6	(Brazil) Maiara Moreiro	Outside Htter	1.85	January 11, 1990 (age 36)
7	(Brazil) Jordane Tolentino	Setter	1.77	December 23, 1985 (age 40)
8	(Brazil) Jaqueline Carvalho	Outside Hitter	1.86	December 31, 1983 (age 42)
9	(Brazil) Gabriela Silva	Middle Blocker	1.84	March 5, 1996 (age 30)
10	(Brazil) Juliana Castro	Opposite	1.87	May 30, 1985 (age 41)
11	(Brazil) Juliana Nogueira	Outside Hitter	1.90	August 4, 1988 (age 38)
12	(Brazil) Laís Vasques	Libero	1.72	February 12, 1996 (age 30)
13	(Brazil) Carla Santos	Outside Hitter	1.73	January 17, 1992 (age 34)
14	(Brazil) Jessica Ventura	Outside Hitter	1.84	October 6, 1991 (age 35)
15	(Brazil) Mariana Costa	Outside Hitter	1.80	June 30, 1986 (age 40)
16	(Brazil) Karoline Tormena	Outside Hitter	1.89	March 21, 1996 (age 30)
17	(Brazil) Valquíria Dullius	Middle Blocker	1.90	August 19, 1994 (age 32)
18	(Brazil) Camila	Setter	1.82	July 7, 1986 (age 40)
