= Vivo Minas =

- Formerly: Telemig Celular
- Industry: Telecommunications
- Headquarters: Belo Horizonte, Brazil

Vivo Minas (formerly known as Telemig Celular) was a regional Brazilian telecommunications company
