= Carol Gattaz =

Brazilian volleyball player (born 1981)

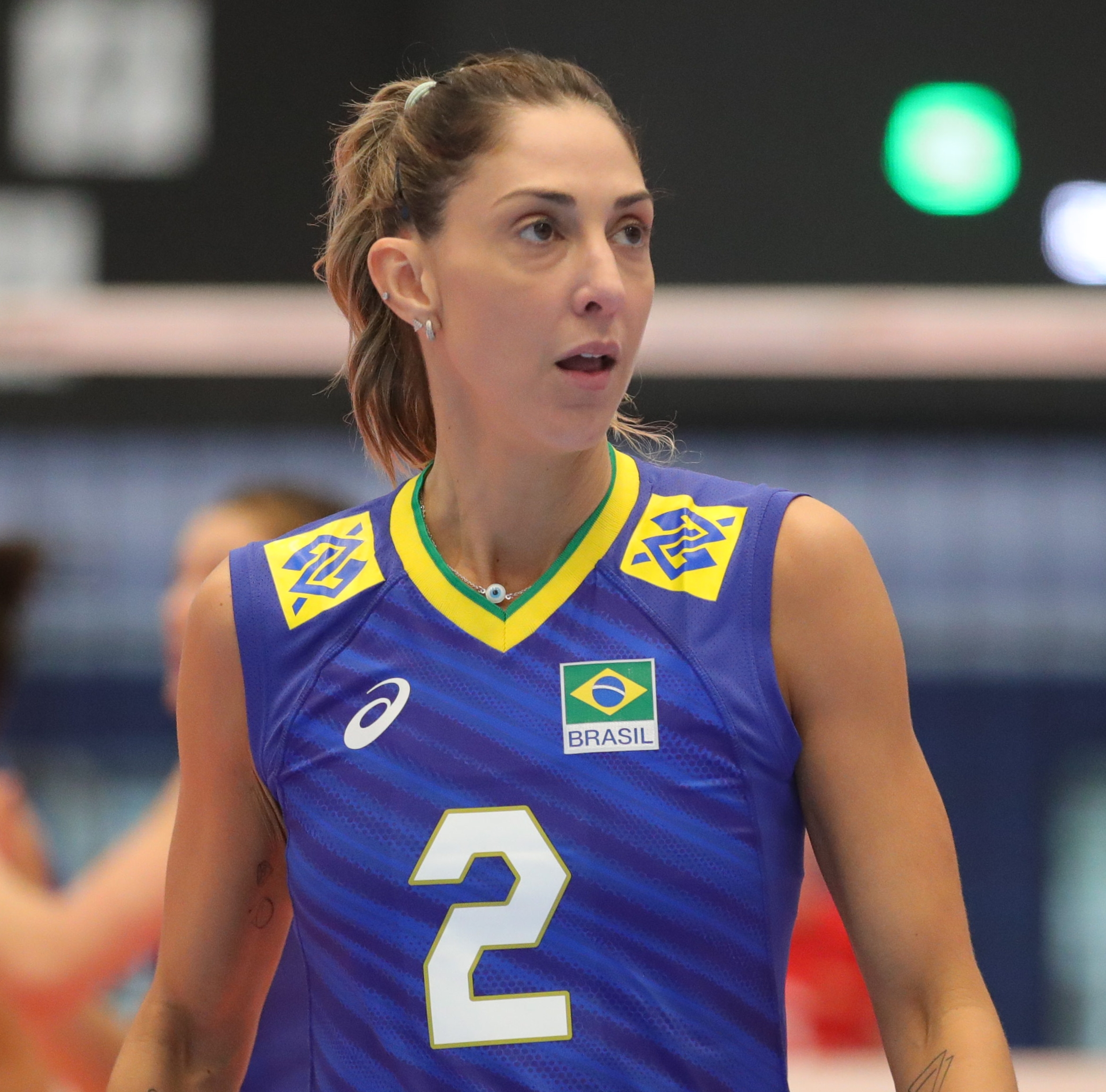
- Gattaz in 2022

Personal information
- Full name: Caroline de Oliveira Saad Gattaz
- Born: 27 July 1981 (age 45); São José do Rio Preto, São Paulo, Brazil
- Height: 1.93 m (6 ft 4 in)
- Weight: 78 kg (172 lb)
- Spike: 315 cm (124 in)
- Block: 299 cm (118 in)

Volleyball information
- Position: Middle-Blocker
- Current club: (Brazil) Praia Clube
- Number: 2

Career
Years	Teams
1998–00	(Brazil) São Caetano Esporte Clube
2000–01	(Brazil) Rio de Janeiro Vôlei Clube
2001–04	(Brazil) São Caetano Esporte Clube
2004–07	(Brazil) Finasa/Osasco
2007–08	(Italy) Monte Schiavo Jesi
2008–11	(Brazil) Rio de Janeiro Vôlei Clube
2011–12	(Brazil) Vôlei Futuro
2012–13	(Azerbaijan) Igtisadchi Baku
2013–14	(Brazil) Vôlei Amil/Campinas
2014–2024	(Brazil) Itambé/Minas
2024-26	(Brazil) Praia Clube

National team
2002–2010, 2021-2022	Brazil
Honours
Women's volleyball
Representing Brazil
Olympic Games
Silver medal – second place	2020 Tokyo	Team
World Championship
Silver medal – second place	2006 Japan	Team
Silver medal – second place	2010 Japan	Team
Silver medal – second place	2022 Netherlands/Poland	Team
World Cup
Silver medal – second place	2007 Japan	Team
World Grand Champions Cup
Gold medal – first place	2005 Nagoya	Team
Gold medal – first place	2013 Tokyo/Nagoya	Team
Silver medal – second place	2009 Tokyo/Fukuoka	Team
FIVB World Grand Prix
Gold medal – first place	Reggio Calabria 2004	Team
Gold medal – first place	Sendai 2005	Team
Gold medal – first place	Reggio Calabria 2006	Team
Gold medal – first place	Yokohama 2008	Team
Gold medal – first place	Tokyo 2009	Team
Pan-American Cup
Gold medal – first place	2009 Miami
Final Four Cup
Gold medal – first place	2009 Lima
South American Championship
Gold medal – first place	2005 La Paz
Gold medal – first place	2009 Porto Alegre
Gold medal – first place	2021 Barrancabermeja
FIVB Nations League
Silver medal – second place	2021 Rimini	Team

Caroline de Oliveira Saad "Carol" Gattaz (Brazilian Portuguese pronunciation: [kaˈɾɔw gaˈta(j)s]; born 27 July 1981) is a former Brazilian volleyball player. She competed at the 2020 Summer Olympics, in the Women's tournament, winning a silver medal. Gattaz won the World Grand Prix three times in a row.

== Early life ==
Gattaz was born in São José do Rio Preto. Before playing volleyball, as a teenager, Gattaz played futsal, defending her city's club América-SP, where she played as a striker. Still in high school, she started playing volleyball.

== Career ==
Gattaz, who played as a middle blocker, started her career defending São Caetano, then moved to Rexona-Ades in 2000. After leaving Rexona-Ades in 2001, she played for several clubs, before joining Finasa/Osasco in 2004, when she won the Superliga Brasileira de Voleibol, she left the club after the 2006–2007 season. In 2007, she moved to Italy, where she played for Monte Schiavo, returning in the following season to Brazil, to defend Rexona-Ades again. In 2011-2012 she played for Volei Futuro from Brazil.

Following a serious anterior cruciate ligament injury that was not being resolved through physiotherapy and that she already tried to solve through surgery, Gattaz decided to end her career in 2026 when she was forty four years old and was playing for the Praia Clube team.

After retiring, Gattaz underwent another knee surgery to resolve her injury.

=== National team ===
Defending the national team, she won the South American Women's Volleyball Championship in 2003, 2005, 2007, and 2009 and the World Grand Prix in 2004, 2005, 2006, 2008 and 2009.

She also won a silver medal at the 2020 Summer Olympics.

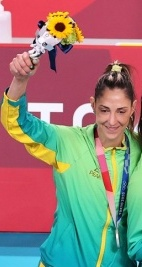
Gattaz with her silver medal at the 2020 Summer Olympics

== Later career ==
Gattaz currently works as a volleyball commentator on SporTV, a Brazilian cable television network.

== Personal life ==
She is openly lesbian.

Gattaz is a fan and supporter of the Clube Atlético Mineiro soccer team of Belo Horizonte, Brazil.

== Awards ==
=== Individuals ===
- 2005 South American Championship – "Best Blocker"
- 2009 South American Championship– "Best Blocker"
- 2009 South American Club Championship – "Best Blocker"
- 2009 Montreux Volley Masters – "Best Blocker"
- 2018 South American Club Championship – "Most Valuable Player"
- 2019 South American Club Championship – "Most Valuable Player"
- 2018–19 Brazilian Superliga – "Best Middle Blocker"
- 2020 South American Club Championship – "Best Blocker"
- 2021 FIVB Nations League - "Best Middle Blocker"
- 2020 Tokyo Olympics 2020 - "Best Blocker"
- 2021 South American Championship – "Best Blocker"

=== Clubs ===
- 2004–05 Brazilian Superliga – Champion, with Finasa/Osasco
- 2005–06 Brazilian Superliga – Runner-up, with Finasa/Osasco
- 2006–07 Brazilian Superliga – Runner-up, with Finasa/Osasco
- 2008–09 Brazilian Superliga – Champion, with Rexona/Ades
- 2009–10 Brazilian Superliga – Runner-up, with Unilever Vôlei
- 2010–11 Brazilian Superliga – Champion, with Unilever Vôlei
- 2011–12 Brazilian Superliga – Bronze medal, with Vôlei Futuro
- 2015–16 Brazilian Superliga – Bronze medal, with Camponesa/Minas
- 2017–18 Brazilian Superliga – Bronze medal, with Camponesa/Minas
- 2018–19 Brazilian Superliga – Champion, with Itambé/Minas
- 2020–21 Brazilian Superliga – Champion, with Itambé/Minas
- 2012–13 Azerbaijan Superleague – Runner-up, with Igtisadchi Baku
- 2009 South American Club Championship – Runner-up, with Unilever Vôlei
- 2018 South American Club Championship – Champion, with Camponesa/Minas
- 2019 South American Club Championship – Champion, with Itambé/Minas
- 2020 South American Club Championship – Champion, with Itambé/Minas
- 2018 FIVB Club World Championship – Runner-up, with Itambé/Minas

Awards
Preceded by (Serbia) Milena Rašić (United States) Foluke Akinradewo	Best Middle Blockers of Olympic Games; 2020 (with (United States) Haleigh Washington)	Succeeded by (Italy) Anna Danesi (United States) Chiaka Ogbogu
Preceded by (Brazil) Ana Beatriz Corrêa (United States) Haleigh Washington	Best Middle Blockers of FIVB Nations League; 2021 (with (Turkey) Eda Erdem Dündar)	Succeeded by (Serbia) Jovana Stevanović (Brazil) Ana Carolina da Silva
