= 2013 FIVB World Grand Prix squads =

This article show all participating team squads at the 2013 FIVB World Grand Prix, played by twelve countries with the final round held in Sapporo, Japan.

== Algeria ==
The following is the Algeria roster in the 2013 FIVB World Grand Prix.

#	Name	Date of Birth	Height	Weight	Spike	Block	Club
1	Nadira Ait Oumghar	9 October 1994	185 cm (6 ft 1 in)	77 kg (170 lb)	281 cm (9 ft 3 in)	263 cm (8 ft 8 in)	Seddouk Volleyball
2	Dallal Merwa Achour	3 November 1994	176 cm (5 ft 9 in)	60 kg (130 lb)	275 cm (9 ft 0 in)	262 cm (8 ft 7 in)	Asv Blida
3	Salima Hammouche	17 January 1984	158 cm (5 ft 2 in)	54 kg (119 lb)	270 cm (8 ft 10 in)	265 cm (8 ft 8 in)	G.S.Petroliers
4	Fatma Zahra Djouad	12 July 1988	180 cm (5 ft 11 in)	62 kg (137 lb)	295 cm (9 ft 8 in)	285 cm (9 ft 4 in)	MBBEJAIA
5	Sarra Belhocine	18 September 1994	179 cm (5 ft 10 in)	62 kg (137 lb)	272 cm (8 ft 11 in)	260 cm (8 ft 6 in)	Gs Petroliers
6	Silya Magnana	16 March 1991	181 cm (5 ft 11 in)	68 kg (150 lb)	274 cm (9 ft 0 in)	261 cm (8 ft 7 in)	Mb Bejaia
7	Manel Yagoubi	25 June 1992	178 cm (5 ft 10 in)	70 kg (150 lb)	295 cm (9 ft 8 in)	290 cm (9 ft 6 in)	NEDJMET CHLEF
8	Zohra Bensalem	5 April 1990	178 cm (5 ft 10 in)	68 kg (150 lb)	310 cm (10 ft 2 in)	299 cm (9 ft 10 in)	G.S.Petroliers
9	Amina Saoud	18 July 1993	173 cm (5 ft 8 in)	62 kg (137 lb)	295 cm (9 ft 8 in)	280 cm (9 ft 2 in)	ASWBEJAIA
10	Fatima Zahra Oukazi	18 January 1984	175 cm (5 ft 9 in)	67 kg (148 lb)	295 cm (9 ft 8 in)	283 cm (9 ft 3 in)	G.S.Petroliers
11	Mouni Abderrahim	19 November 1985	171 cm (5 ft 7 in)	60 kg (130 lb)	305 cm (10 ft 0 in)	293 cm (9 ft 7 in)	Mb Bejaia
12	Safia Boukhima	10 January 1991	176 cm (5 ft 9 in)	64 kg (141 lb)	294 cm (9 ft 8 in)	284 cm (9 ft 4 in)	G.S.Petroliers
13	Nawal Mansouri	1 August 1985	174 cm (5 ft 9 in)	64 kg (141 lb)	291 cm (9 ft 7 in)	281 cm (9 ft 3 in)	Mb Bejaia
14	Kahina Messaoudene	15 July 1992	183 cm (6 ft 0 in)	56 kg (123 lb)	299 cm (9 ft 10 in)	290 cm (9 ft 6 in)	ASW BEJAIA
15	Aicha Mezemate	6 June 1991	187 cm (6 ft 2 in)	75 kg (165 lb)	300 cm (9 ft 10 in)	285 cm (9 ft 4 in)	G.S.Petroliers
16	Siham Saoud	18 July 1993	174 cm (5 ft 9 in)	62 kg (137 lb)	295 cm (9 ft 8 in)	280 cm (9 ft 2 in)	Asw Bejaia
17	Lydia Oulmou	2 February 1986	181 cm (5 ft 11 in)	59 kg (130 lb)	291 cm (9 ft 7 in)	284 cm (9 ft 4 in)	Hainaut Volley
18	Tassadit Aissou	19 June 1989	184 cm (6 ft 0 in)	80 kg (180 lb)	295 cm (9 ft 8 in)	285 cm (9 ft 4 in)	Nedjmet Chlef
19	Celia Bourihane	22 January 1995	178 cm (5 ft 10 in)	56 kg (123 lb)	277 cm (9 ft 1 in)	255 cm (8 ft 4 in)	Ncbejaia
20	Kahina Arbouche	4 September 1993	175 cm (5 ft 9 in)	60 kg (130 lb)	295 cm (9 ft 8 in)	280 cm (9 ft 2 in)	Asw Bejaia
21	Yasmine Ousalah	4 July 1993	174 cm (5 ft 9 in)	60 kg (130 lb)	270 cm (8 ft 10 in)	268 cm (8 ft 10 in)	Asw Bejaia
22	Nawel Hammouche	25 April 1997	185 cm (6 ft 1 in)	62 kg (137 lb)	275 cm (9 ft 0 in)	265 cm (8 ft 8 in)	Ncbejaia

== Argentina ==
The following is the Argentina roster in the 2013 FIVB World Grand Prix.

#	Name	Date of Birth	Height	Weight	Spike	Block	Club
1	Lucia Gaido	19 January 1988	164 cm (5 ft 5 in)	53 kg (117 lb)	245 cm (8 ft 0 in)	244 cm (8 ft 0 in)	Stiinta Bacau
2	Josefina Fernandez	17 August 1991	175 cm (5 ft 9 in)	72 kg (159 lb)	294 cm (9 ft 8 in)	284 cm (9 ft 4 in)	Hotel VFM
3	Paula Yamila Nizetich	27 January 1989	181 cm (5 ft 11 in)	74 kg (163 lb)	305 cm (10 ft 0 in)	295 cm (9 ft 8 in)	NIlufer
4	Sol Piccolo	11 September 1996	184 cm (6 ft 0 in)	74 kg (163 lb)	294 cm (9 ft 8 in)	282 cm (9 ft 3 in)	Velez Sarsfield
5	Lucia Fresco	14 May 1991	195 cm (6 ft 5 in)	92 kg (203 lb)	304 cm (10 ft 0 in)	290 cm (9 ft 6 in)	Urbino
6	Daniela Gildenberger	12 June 1984	180 cm (5 ft 11 in)	77 kg (170 lb)	300 cm (9 ft 10 in)	290 cm (9 ft 6 in)	GELP
7	Natalia Aispurua	20 December 1991	192 cm (6 ft 4 in)	78 kg (172 lb)	310 cm (10 ft 2 in)	293 cm (9 ft 7 in)	Boca Juniors
8	Tanya Acosta	11 March 1991	182 cm (6 ft 0 in)	70 kg (150 lb)	287 cm (9 ft 5 in)	280 cm (9 ft 2 in)	GELP
9	Viviana Dominko	3 October 1982	172 cm (5 ft 8 in)	68 kg (150 lb)	289 cm (9 ft 6 in)	270 cm (8 ft 10 in)	Banfield
10	Emilce Sosa	11 September 1987	177 cm (5 ft 10 in)	72 kg (159 lb)	305 cm (10 ft 0 in)	295 cm (9 ft 8 in)	Rio Do Soul
11	Georgina Pinedo	30 May 1981	180 cm (5 ft 11 in)	64 kg (141 lb)	312 cm (10 ft 3 in)	290 cm (9 ft 6 in)	Le Cannet
12	Tatiana Soledad Rizzo	30 December 1986	178 cm (5 ft 10 in)	64 kg (141 lb)	280 cm (9 ft 2 in)	268 cm (8 ft 10 in)	Boca Juniors
13	Leticia Boscacci	8 November 1985	186 cm (6 ft 1 in)	70 kg (150 lb)	302 cm (9 ft 11 in)	284 cm (9 ft 4 in)	VC Kanti
14	Florencia Carlotto	14 October 1988	183 cm (6 ft 0 in)	72 kg (159 lb)	302 cm (9 ft 11 in)	291 cm (9 ft 7 in)	Velez Sarsfield
15	Sherry Moreno	21 October 1989	185 cm (6 ft 1 in)	77 kg (170 lb)	303 cm (9 ft 11 in)	295 cm (9 ft 8 in)	Glorias Argentinas
16	Florencia Natasha Busquets Reyes	27 June 1989	192 cm (6 ft 4 in)	68 kg (150 lb)	305 cm (10 ft 0 in)	290 cm (9 ft 6 in)	Hotel VFM
17	Antonela Ayelen Curatola	23 October 1991	175 cm (5 ft 9 in)	71 kg (157 lb)	290 cm (9 ft 6 in)	280 cm (9 ft 2 in)	Velez Sarsfield
18	Yael Castiglione	27 September 1985	184 cm (6 ft 0 in)	75 kg (165 lb)	295 cm (9 ft 8 in)	281 cm (9 ft 3 in)	Rio Do Soul
19	Elina Rodriguez	11 February 1997	189 cm (6 ft 2 in)	72 kg (159 lb)	300 cm (9 ft 10 in)	284 cm (9 ft 4 in)	San Lorenzo
20	Mariangeles Cossar	7 April 1990	177 cm (5 ft 10 in)	70 kg (150 lb)	290 cm (9 ft 6 in)	280 cm (9 ft 2 in)	Boca Juniors
21	Maria Sol Calvete	14 September 1994	179 cm (5 ft 10 in)	65 kg (143 lb)	295 cm (9 ft 8 in)	283 cm (9 ft 3 in)	Glorias Argentinas
22	Eugenia Nosach	31 March 1993	175 cm (5 ft 9 in)	66 kg (146 lb)	290 cm (9 ft 6 in)	277 cm (9 ft 1 in)	Boca Juniors

== Brazil ==
- Head Coach: José Roberto Guimarães

The following is the Brazil roster in the 2013 FIVB World Grand Prix.

#	Name	Date of Birth	Height	Weight	Spike	Block	Club
1	Fabiana Claudino	24 January 1985	193 cm (6 ft 4 in)	76 kg (168 lb)	314 cm (10 ft 4 in)	293 cm (9 ft 7 in)	SESI - SP
2	Juciely Cristina Barreto	18 December 1980	184 cm (6 ft 0 in)	71 kg (157 lb)	312 cm (10 ft 3 in)	289 cm (9 ft 6 in)	Rexona-Ades
3	Danielle Lins	5 January 1985	181 cm (5 ft 11 in)	68 kg (150 lb)	290 cm (9 ft 6 in)	276 cm (9 ft 1 in)	Molico/Nestlé
4	Ellen Braga	12 June 1991	178 cm (5 ft 10 in)	65 kg (143 lb)	288 cm (9 ft 5 in)	284 cm (9 ft 4 in)	Esporte Clube Pinheiros
5	Adenizia da Silva	18 December 1986	185 cm (6 ft 1 in)	63 kg (139 lb)	312 cm (10 ft 3 in)	290 cm (9 ft 6 in)	Molico/Nestlé
6	Thaisa Menezes	15 May 1987	196 cm (6 ft 5 in)	79 kg (174 lb)	316 cm (10 ft 4 in)	301 cm (9 ft 11 in)	Molico/Nestlé
7	Priscila Daroit	10 August 1988	182 cm (6 ft 0 in)	74 kg (163 lb)	290 cm (9 ft 6 in)	280 cm (9 ft 2 in)	SESI - SP
8	Claudia Silva	21 September 1987	181 cm (5 ft 11 in)	80 kg (180 lb)	290 cm (9 ft 6 in)	266 cm (8 ft 9 in)	Minas Tenis Clube
9	Michelle Pavão	31 October 1986	178 cm (5 ft 10 in)	62 kg (137 lb)	295 cm (9 ft 8 in)	283 cm (9 ft 3 in)	BRASÍLIA VÔLEI
10	Gabriela Guimaraes	19 May 1994	176 cm (5 ft 9 in)	59 kg (130 lb)	295 cm (9 ft 8 in)	274 cm (9 ft 0 in)	Rexona-Ades
11	Tandara Caixeta	30 October 1988	184 cm (6 ft 0 in)	87 kg (192 lb)	305 cm (10 ft 0 in)	297 cm (9 ft 9 in)	BANANA BOAT/PRAIA CLUBE
12	Natalia Pereira	4 April 1989	183 cm (6 ft 0 in)	76 kg (168 lb)	300 cm (9 ft 10 in)	288 cm (9 ft 5 in)	Rexona-Ades
13	Sheilla Castro	1 July 1983	185 cm (6 ft 1 in)	64 kg (141 lb)	302 cm (9 ft 11 in)	284 cm (9 ft 4 in)	Vakifbank
14	Fabiana Oliveira	7 March 1980	169 cm (5 ft 7 in)	59 kg (130 lb)	276 cm (9 ft 1 in)	266 cm (8 ft 9 in)	Unilever Volei
15	Monique Pavão	31 October 1986	178 cm (5 ft 10 in)	67 kg (148 lb)	294 cm (9 ft 8 in)	285 cm (9 ft 4 in)	SESI
16	Fernanda Rodrigues	10 May 1986	179 cm (5 ft 10 in)	74 kg (163 lb)	308 cm (10 ft 1 in)	288 cm (9 ft 5 in)	Dinamo Krasnodar
17	Fabiola de Sousa	3 February 1983	184 cm (6 ft 0 in)	70 kg (150 lb)	300 cm (9 ft 10 in)	285 cm (9 ft 4 in)	Dinamo Krasnodar
18	Camila Brait	28 October 1988	170 cm (5 ft 7 in)	58 kg (128 lb)	271 cm (8 ft 11 in)	256 cm (8 ft 5 in)	Molico/Nestlé
19	Leticia Hage	9 September 1990	187 cm (6 ft 2 in)	83 kg (183 lb)	301 cm (9 ft 11 in)	288 cm (9 ft 5 in)	São Caetano E.C.
20	Ana Beatriz Correa	7 February 1992	187 cm (6 ft 2 in)	70 kg (150 lb)	298 cm (9 ft 9 in)	292 cm (9 ft 7 in)	SESI - SP
21	Ivna Marra	25 January 1990	185 cm (6 ft 1 in)	76 kg (168 lb)	305 cm (10 ft 0 in)	294 cm (9 ft 8 in)	SESI - SP
22	Suelen Pinto	4 October 1987	166 cm (5 ft 5 in)	81 kg (179 lb)	256 cm (8 ft 5 in)	238 cm (7 ft 10 in)	SESI - SP

== Bulgaria ==
The following is the Bulgaria roster in the 2013 FIVB World Grand Prix.

#	Name	Date of Birth	Height	Weight	Spike	Block	Club
1	Diana Nenova	16 April 1985	178 cm (5 ft 10 in)	70 kg (150 lb)	294 cm (9 ft 8 in)	298 cm (9 ft 9 in)	Schweriner
2	Desislava Nikolova	21 December 1991	184 cm (6 ft 0 in)	70 kg (150 lb)	290 cm (9 ft 6 in)	285 cm (9 ft 4 in)	Halkbank
3	Kremena Kamenova	21 May 1988	185 cm (6 ft 1 in)	64 kg (141 lb)	304 cm (10 ft 0 in)	299 cm (9 ft 10 in)	VC Dorozhnik
4	Lora Kitipova	19 May 1991	184 cm (6 ft 0 in)	66 kg (146 lb)	290 cm (9 ft 6 in)	283 cm (9 ft 3 in)	Azeryol
5	Dobriana Rabadzhieva	14 June 1991	190 cm (6 ft 3 in)	72 kg (159 lb)	305 cm (10 ft 0 in)	285 cm (9 ft 4 in)	Volero
6	Tsvetelina Zarkova	18 December 1986	187 cm (6 ft 2 in)	69 kg (152 lb)	298 cm (9 ft 9 in)	289 cm (9 ft 6 in)	VC Dinamo Romprest
7	Gabriela Koeva	25 July 1989	187 cm (6 ft 2 in)	72 kg (159 lb)	306 cm (10 ft 0 in)	298 cm (9 ft 9 in)	Besiktas JK
8	Simona Dimitrova	17 July 1994	185 cm (6 ft 1 in)	82 kg (181 lb)	290 cm (9 ft 6 in)	280 cm (9 ft 2 in)	TFSE
9	Petya Barakova	18 June 1994	180 cm (5 ft 11 in)	76 kg (168 lb)	283 cm (9 ft 3 in)	271 cm (8 ft 11 in)	Levski
10	Gergana Dimitrova	28 February 1996	184 cm (6 ft 0 in)	71 kg (157 lb)	305 cm (10 ft 0 in)	288 cm (9 ft 5 in)	Sm'Aesch
11	Hristina Ruseva	1 October 1991	190 cm (6 ft 3 in)	77 kg (170 lb)	305 cm (10 ft 0 in)	290 cm (9 ft 6 in)	Nilufer Belediye
12	Mariya Karakasheva	27 October 1988	182 cm (6 ft 0 in)	68 kg (150 lb)	295 cm (9 ft 8 in)	290 cm (9 ft 6 in)	CSKA
13	Mariya Filipova	10 September 1982	178 cm (5 ft 10 in)	68 kg (150 lb)	295 cm (9 ft 8 in)	275 cm (9 ft 0 in)	Volley 2002
14	Slavina Koleva	22 November 1986	184 cm (6 ft 0 in)	57 kg (126 lb)	302 cm (9 ft 11 in)	297 cm (9 ft 9 in)	VC Karsiyaka
15	Silvana Chausheva	19 May 1995	188 cm (6 ft 2 in)	75 kg (165 lb)	305 cm (10 ft 0 in)	290 cm (9 ft 6 in)	Maritza
16	Elitsa Vasileva	13 May 1990	194 cm (6 ft 4 in)	73 kg (161 lb)	302 cm (9 ft 11 in)	290 cm (9 ft 6 in)	VakifBank
17	Strashimira Filipova	18 August 1985	195 cm (6 ft 5 in)	78 kg (172 lb)	307 cm (10 ft 1 in)	300 cm (9 ft 10 in)	VC Fakel
18	Emiliya Nikolova	26 December 1991	185 cm (6 ft 1 in)	59 kg (130 lb)	302 cm (9 ft 11 in)	287 cm (9 ft 5 in)	Imoco Volley SRL
19	Mira Todorova	12 April 1994	187 cm (6 ft 2 in)	70 kg (150 lb)	312 cm (10 ft 3 in)	300 cm (9 ft 10 in)	Sm'Aesch
20	Zhana Todorova	6 January 1997	170 cm (5 ft 7 in)	56 kg (123 lb)	271 cm (8 ft 11 in)	255 cm (8 ft 4 in)	Maritza

== China ==
- Head Coach: Ping Lang

The following is the China roster in the 2013 FIVB World Grand Prix.

#	Name	Date of Birth	Height	Weight	Spike	Block	Club
1	Yin Na	3 February 1988	182 cm (6 ft 0 in)	65 kg (143 lb)	313 cm (10 ft 3 in)	300 cm (9 ft 10 in)	Tianjin
2	Zhu Ting	29 November 1994	198 cm (6 ft 6 in)	78 kg (172 lb)	327 cm (10 ft 9 in)	300 cm (9 ft 10 in)	Henan
3	Mi Yang	24 January 1989	180 cm (5 ft 11 in)	70 kg (150 lb)	305 cm (10 ft 0 in)	298 cm (9 ft 9 in)	Tianjin
4	Wang Na	25 February 1990	178 cm (5 ft 10 in)	63 kg (139 lb)	305 cm (10 ft 0 in)	295 cm (9 ft 8 in)	Zhejiang
5	Shen Jingsi	3 May 1989	186 cm (6 ft 1 in)	75 kg (165 lb)	305 cm (10 ft 0 in)	294 cm (9 ft 8 in)	Army
6	Yang Junjing	15 May 1989	190 cm (6 ft 3 in)	70 kg (150 lb)	308 cm (10 ft 1 in)	300 cm (9 ft 10 in)	Army
7	Zhang Xian	16 March 1985	168 cm (5 ft 6 in)	57 kg (126 lb)	290 cm (9 ft 6 in)	280 cm (9 ft 2 in)	Guangdong Evergrande
8	Zeng Chunlei	3 November 1989	187 cm (6 ft 2 in)	67 kg (148 lb)	315 cm (10 ft 4 in)	315 cm (10 ft 4 in)	Beijing
9	Wang Yimei	11 January 1988	190 cm (6 ft 3 in)	87 kg (192 lb)	318 cm (10 ft 5 in)	305 cm (10 ft 0 in)	Liaoning
10	Shan Danna	8 October 1991	168 cm (5 ft 6 in)	60 kg (130 lb)	290 cm (9 ft 6 in)	285 cm (9 ft 4 in)	Zhejiang
11	Xu Yunli	2 August 1987	195 cm (6 ft 5 in)	75 kg (165 lb)	325 cm (10 ft 8 in)	306 cm (10 ft 0 in)	Fujian
12	Hui Ruoqi	4 March 1991	192 cm (6 ft 4 in)	78 kg (172 lb)	315 cm (10 ft 4 in)	305 cm (10 ft 0 in)	Jiangsu Volleyball Club
13	Liu Yanhan	19 January 1993	188 cm (6 ft 2 in)	75 kg (165 lb)	315 cm (10 ft 4 in)	305 cm (10 ft 0 in)	Army
14	Yang Jie	1 March 1994	194 cm (6 ft 4 in)	82 kg (181 lb)	312 cm (10 ft 3 in)	300 cm (9 ft 10 in)	Shanghai
15	Liu Xiaotong	16 February 1990	188 cm (6 ft 2 in)	70 kg (150 lb)	312 cm (10 ft 3 in)	300 cm (9 ft 10 in)	Beijing
16	Zhang Lei	11 January 1985	181 cm (5 ft 11 in)	71 kg (157 lb)	316 cm (10 ft 4 in)	310 cm (10 ft 2 in)	Shanghai
17	Yao Di	15 August 1992	182 cm (6 ft 0 in)	65 kg (143 lb)	306 cm (10 ft 0 in)	298 cm (9 ft 9 in)	Tianjin
18	Qiao Ting	2 March 1992	189 cm (6 ft 2 in)	66 kg (146 lb)	315 cm (10 ft 4 in)	315 cm (10 ft 4 in)	Beijing
19	Liu Congcong	8 December 1990	189 cm (6 ft 2 in)	65 kg (143 lb)	310 cm (10 ft 2 in)	302 cm (9 ft 11 in)	Army
20	Chen Zhan	11 October 1990	180 cm (5 ft 11 in)	65 kg (143 lb)	300 cm (9 ft 10 in)	295 cm (9 ft 8 in)	Jiangsu
21	Ma Yunwen	19 October 1986	190 cm (6 ft 3 in)	76 kg (168 lb)	315 cm (10 ft 4 in)	307 cm (10 ft 1 in)	Shanghai
22	Liu Dan	29 August 1989	180 cm (5 ft 11 in)	65 kg (143 lb)	305 cm (10 ft 0 in)	295 cm (9 ft 8 in)	Guangdong Evergrande

== Cuba ==
The following is the Cuba roster in the 2013 FIVB World Grand Prix.

#	Name	Date of Birth	Height	Weight	Spike	Block	Club
1	Melissa Teresa Vargas Abreu	16 October 1999	184 cm (6 ft 0 in)	78 kg (172 lb)	244 cm (8 ft 0 in)	242 cm (7 ft 11 in)	Cienfuegos
2	Lilianny Marsillan Aguero	5 October 1991	181 cm (5 ft 11 in)	65 kg (143 lb)	300 cm (9 ft 10 in)	295 cm (9 ft 8 in)	Cienfuegos
3	Alena Rojas Orta	9 August 1992	186 cm (6 ft 1 in)	76 kg (168 lb)	320 cm (10 ft 6 in)	305 cm (10 ft 0 in)	Habana
4	Yoana Palacio Mendoza	6 October 1990	184 cm (6 ft 0 in)	67 kg (148 lb)	313 cm (10 ft 3 in)	300 cm (9 ft 10 in)	La Habana
5	Heidy Casanova Alvarez	6 November 1998	184 cm (6 ft 0 in)	78 kg (172 lb)	244 cm (8 ft 0 in)	240 cm (7 ft 10 in)	La Habana
6	Daymara Lescay Cajigal	5 September 1992	184 cm (6 ft 0 in)	72 kg (159 lb)	308 cm (10 ft 1 in)	290 cm (9 ft 6 in)	Guantanamo
7	Claudia Hernandez Aguila	9 January 1997	181 cm (5 ft 11 in)	78 kg (172 lb)	225 cm (7 ft 5 in)	223 cm (7 ft 4 in)	La Habana
8	Emily Borrell Cruz	19 February 1992	167 cm (5 ft 6 in)	55 kg (121 lb)	270 cm (8 ft 10 in)	260 cm (8 ft 6 in)	Villa Clara
9	Dayessi Luis Ruiz	23 October 1996	170 cm (5 ft 7 in)	60 kg (130 lb)	288 cm (9 ft 5 in)	248 cm (8 ft 2 in)	Camaguey
10	Ana Yilian Cleger Abel	27 November 1989	183 cm (6 ft 0 in)	69 kg (152 lb)	300 cm (9 ft 10 in)	285 cm (9 ft 4 in)	Santiago de Cuba
11	Gretell Elena Moreno Borrero	30 January 1998	183 cm (6 ft 0 in)	68 kg (150 lb)	287 cm (9 ft 5 in)	280 cm (9 ft 2 in)	Granma
12	Dairilys Margarita Cruz Perez	12 September 1990	183 cm (6 ft 0 in)	65 kg (143 lb)	310 cm (10 ft 2 in)	305 cm (10 ft 0 in)	Villa Clara
13	Rosanna Giel Ramos	10 June 1992	187 cm (6 ft 2 in)	62 kg (137 lb)	320 cm (10 ft 6 in)	315 cm (10 ft 4 in)	Ciego de Avila
14	Dayami Sanchez Savon	14 March 1994	188 cm (6 ft 2 in)	64 kg (141 lb)	314 cm (10 ft 4 in)	302 cm (9 ft 11 in)	Ciudad Habana
15	Beatriz Vilches Santana	29 January 1995	182 cm (6 ft 0 in)	68 kg (150 lb)	288 cm (9 ft 5 in)	277 cm (9 ft 1 in)	Cienfuegos
16	Anet Barbara Alfonso Benitez	26 June 1996	172 cm (5 ft 8 in)	54 kg (119 lb)	225 cm (7 ft 5 in)	222 cm (7 ft 3 in)	Camaguey
17	Yelennis Diaz Cairo	14 October 1995	189 cm (6 ft 2 in)	71 kg (157 lb)	300 cm (9 ft 10 in)	298 cm (9 ft 9 in)	Villa Clara
18	Sulian Caridad Matienzo Linares	14 December 1994	178 cm (5 ft 10 in)	75 kg (165 lb)	232 cm (7 ft 7 in)	230 cm (7 ft 7 in)	La Habana
19	Jennifer Yanet Alvarez Hernandez	29 November 1993	184 cm (6 ft 0 in)	72 kg (159 lb)	310 cm (10 ft 2 in)	294 cm (9 ft 8 in)	Cienfuegos
20	Heidy Margarita Rodriguez Lopez	24 June 1993	187 cm (6 ft 2 in)	66 kg (146 lb)	312 cm (10 ft 3 in)	308 cm (10 ft 1 in)	Villa Clara

== Czech Republic ==
The following is the Czech Republic roster in the 2013 FIVB World Grand Prix.

#	Name	Date of Birth	Height	Weight	Spike	Block	Club
1	Andrea Kossanyiova	6 August 1993	186 cm (6 ft 1 in)	72 kg (159 lb)	310 cm (10 ft 2 in)	300 cm (9 ft 10 in)	VK Prostejov
2	Eva Hodanova	18 December 1993	189 cm (6 ft 2 in)	75 kg (165 lb)	306 cm (10 ft 0 in)	298 cm (9 ft 9 in)	PVK Olymp Praha
3	Kristyna Pastulova	22 October 1985	197 cm (6 ft 6 in)	84 kg (185 lb)	315 cm (10 ft 4 in)	302 cm (9 ft 11 in)	VC PUNTOTEL Sala Consilina
4	Aneta Havlickova	3 July 1987	190 cm (6 ft 3 in)	96 kg (212 lb)	316 cm (10 ft 4 in)	300 cm (9 ft 10 in)	Lokomotiv Baku
5	Julie Kovarova	14 September 1987	179 cm (5 ft 10 in)	62 kg (137 lb)	295 cm (9 ft 8 in)	280 cm (9 ft 2 in)	VK Prostejov
6	Lucie Smutna	14 April 1991	180 cm (5 ft 11 in)	75 kg (165 lb)	307 cm (10 ft 1 in)	285 cm (9 ft 4 in)	Ass. Volley Soverato
7	Sarka Kubinova	19 April 1988	178 cm (5 ft 10 in)	63 kg (139 lb)	303 cm (9 ft 11 in)	292 cm (9 ft 7 in)	Volley Köniz
8	Tereza Rossi	3 December 1982	192 cm (6 ft 4 in)	78 kg (172 lb)	310 cm (10 ft 2 in)	285 cm (9 ft 4 in)	Besiktas Istanbul
9	Michaela Monzoni	18 April 1984	193 cm (6 ft 4 in)	75 kg (165 lb)	310 cm (10 ft 2 in)	303 cm (9 ft 11 in)	Lokomotiv Baku
10	Petra Kojdova	23 September 1993	183 cm (6 ft 0 in)	65 kg (143 lb)	304 cm (10 ft 0 in)	296 cm (9 ft 9 in)	SK UP Olomouc
11	Veronika Dostalova	7 April 1992	170 cm (5 ft 7 in)	67 kg (148 lb)	278 cm (9 ft 1 in)	269 cm (8 ft 10 in)	PVK Olymp Praha
12	Karolína Bednárová	20 July 1986	183 cm (6 ft 0 in)	65 kg (143 lb)	305 cm (10 ft 0 in)	299 cm (9 ft 10 in)	PTSV Aachen
13	Tereza Vanzurova	4 April 1991	184 cm (6 ft 0 in)	76 kg (168 lb)	300 cm (9 ft 10 in)	269 cm (8 ft 10 in)	Pallavolo Scandicci-SDB SSDRL
14	Lucie Muhlsteinova	15 October 1984	180 cm (5 ft 11 in)	72 kg (159 lb)	296 cm (9 ft 9 in)	285 cm (9 ft 4 in)	Chemik Police
15	Ivona Svobodnikova	1 April 1991	190 cm (6 ft 3 in)	77 kg (170 lb)	300 cm (9 ft 10 in)	290 cm (9 ft 6 in)	Post-Telekom-Sportverein Aache
16	Helena Havelkova	25 July 1988	186 cm (6 ft 1 in)	70 kg (150 lb)	320 cm (10 ft 6 in)	300 cm (9 ft 10 in)	Yamamay Busto Arsizio
17	Ivana Plchotova	28 October 1982	192 cm (6 ft 4 in)	76 kg (168 lb)	310 cm (10 ft 2 in)	290 cm (9 ft 6 in)	MKS Dabrowa Gornicza
18	Pavla Vincourova	12 November 1992	180 cm (5 ft 11 in)	68 kg (150 lb)	297 cm (9 ft 9 in)	290 cm (9 ft 6 in)	Pallavolo Scandicci-SDB SSDRL
19	Nikol Sajdova	20 July 1988	185 cm (6 ft 1 in)	79 kg (174 lb)	298 cm (9 ft 9 in)	295 cm (9 ft 8 in)	Rote Raben Vilsbiburg
20	Lucie Herbockova	2 January 1994	183 cm (6 ft 0 in)	67 kg (148 lb)	299 cm (9 ft 10 in)	290 cm (9 ft 6 in)	VK Kralovo Pole
21	Michaela Mlejnkova	26 July 1996	184 cm (6 ft 0 in)	70 kg (150 lb)	305 cm (10 ft 0 in)	298 cm (9 ft 9 in)	PVK Olymp Praha

== Dominican Republic ==
- Head Coach: Marcos Kwiek.

The following is the Dominican Republic roster in the 2013 FIVB World Grand Prix.

#	Name	Date of Birth	Height	Weight	Spike	Block	Club
1	Annerys Victoria Vargas Valdez	7 August 1981	196 cm (6 ft 5 in)	70 kg (150 lb)	327 cm (10 ft 9 in)	320 cm (10 ft 6 in)	Seleccion Nacional
2	Winifer Maria Fernandez Perez	6 January 1995	169 cm (5 ft 7 in)	62 kg (137 lb)	270 cm (8 ft 10 in)	265 cm (8 ft 8 in)	Cien Fuego
3	Lisvel Elisa Eve Mejia	10 September 1991	194 cm (6 ft 4 in)	70 kg (150 lb)	325 cm (10 ft 8 in)	315 cm (10 ft 4 in)	Mirador
4	Marianne Fersola Norberto	16 January 1992	191 cm (6 ft 3 in)	60 kg (130 lb)	315 cm (10 ft 4 in)	310 cm (10 ft 2 in)	Mirador
5	Brenda Castillo	5 June 1992	167 cm (5 ft 6 in)	55 kg (121 lb)	245 cm (8 ft 0 in)	230 cm (7 ft 7 in)	San Cristobal
6	Marifranchi Rodriguez	29 August 1990	184 cm (6 ft 0 in)	68 kg (150 lb)	310 cm (10 ft 2 in)	300 cm (9 ft 10 in)	Mirador
7	Niverka Dharlenis Marte Frica	19 October 1990	178 cm (5 ft 10 in)	71 kg (157 lb)	295 cm (9 ft 8 in)	283 cm (9 ft 3 in)	Deportivo Nacional
8	Candida Estefany Arias Perez	11 March 1992	194 cm (6 ft 4 in)	68 kg (150 lb)	320 cm (10 ft 6 in)	315 cm (10 ft 4 in)	San Cristobal
9	Sidarka De Los Milagros Nuñez	25 June 1984	185 cm (6 ft 1 in)	62 kg (137 lb)	330 cm (10 ft 10 in)	320 cm (10 ft 6 in)	Club Malanga
10	Pamela Marie Soriano Olivo	30 June 1995	175 cm (5 ft 9 in)	64 kg (141 lb)	290 cm (9 ft 6 in)	287 cm (9 ft 5 in)	Mirador
11	Jeoselyna Rodriguez Santos	9 December 1991	187 cm (6 ft 2 in)	63 kg (139 lb)	325 cm (10 ft 8 in)	315 cm (10 ft 4 in)	Mirador
12	Karla Miguelina Echenique Medina	16 May 1986	180 cm (5 ft 11 in)	65 kg (143 lb)	300 cm (9 ft 10 in)	290 cm (9 ft 6 in)	Deportivo Nacional
13	Jineiry Martinez	3 December 1997	190 cm (6 ft 3 in)	68 kg (150 lb)	305 cm (10 ft 0 in)	280 cm (9 ft 2 in)	Mirador
14	Prisilla Rivera Brens	29 December 1984	183 cm (6 ft 0 in)	67 kg (148 lb)	309 cm (10 ft 2 in)	305 cm (10 ft 0 in)	San Pedro
15	Celenia Toribio De Leon	17 July 1994	181 cm (5 ft 11 in)	69 kg (152 lb)	290 cm (9 ft 6 in)	286 cm (9 ft 5 in)	Cien Fuego
16	Yonkaira Paola Peña Isabel	10 May 1993	190 cm (6 ft 3 in)	70 kg (150 lb)	320 cm (10 ft 6 in)	310 cm (10 ft 2 in)	Mirador
17	Gina Altagracia Mambru Casilla	21 January 1986	182 cm (6 ft 0 in)	65 kg (143 lb)	330 cm (10 ft 10 in)	315 cm (10 ft 4 in)	Los Cachorros
18	Bethania De La Cruz De Peña	13 May 1987	188 cm (6 ft 2 in)	70 kg (150 lb)	330 cm (10 ft 10 in)	320 cm (10 ft 6 in)	Deportivo Nacional
19	Ana Yorkira Binet Stephens	9 February 1992	174 cm (5 ft 9 in)	58 kg (128 lb)	280 cm (9 ft 2 in)	260 cm (8 ft 6 in)	Samana
20	Brayelin Elizabeth Martinez	11 September 1996	201 cm (6 ft 7 in)	83 kg (183 lb)	330 cm (10 ft 10 in)	320 cm (10 ft 6 in)	Deportivo Nacional
21	Erasma Moreno Martinez	25 November 1991	183 cm (6 ft 0 in)	75 kg (165 lb)	289 cm (9 ft 6 in)	304 cm (10 ft 0 in)	Monte Plata
22	Gaila Ceneida Gonzalez Lopez	25 June 1996	189 cm (6 ft 2 in)	81 kg (179 lb)	304 cm (10 ft 0 in)	276 cm (9 ft 1 in)	MIRADOR

== Germany ==
The following is the Germany roster in the 2013 FIVB World Grand Prix.

#	Name	Date of Birth	Height	Weight	Spike	Block	Club
1	Lenka Dürr	10 December 1990	171 cm (5 ft 7 in)	59 kg (130 lb)	280 cm (9 ft 2 in)	270 cm (8 ft 10 in)	Azeryol Baku
2	Kathleen Weiß	2 February 1984	171 cm (5 ft 7 in)	66 kg (146 lb)	290 cm (9 ft 6 in)	273 cm (8 ft 11 in)	Agel Prostejov
3	Denise Hanke	31 August 1989	179 cm (5 ft 10 in)	58 kg (128 lb)	284 cm (9 ft 4 in)	272 cm (8 ft 11 in)	Impel Wroclaw
4	Maren Brinker	10 July 1986	184 cm (6 ft 0 in)	68 kg (150 lb)	303 cm (9 ft 11 in)	295 cm (9 ft 8 in)	Montichiari Volley
5	Anja Brandt	15 February 1990	195 cm (6 ft 5 in)	77 kg (170 lb)	310 cm (10 ft 2 in)	295 cm (9 ft 8 in)	Schweriner SC
6	Kathy Radzuweit	2 March 1982	196 cm (6 ft 5 in)	76 kg (168 lb)	319 cm (10 ft 6 in)	300 cm (9 ft 10 in)	SC Potsdam
7	Jana Franziska Poll	7 May 1988	185 cm (6 ft 1 in)	69 kg (152 lb)	310 cm (10 ft 2 in)	290 cm (9 ft 6 in)	Schweriner SC
8	Berit Kauffeldt	8 July 1990	190 cm (6 ft 3 in)	75 kg (165 lb)	311 cm (10 ft 2 in)	294 cm (9 ft 8 in)	Impel Wroclaw/POL
9	Corina Ssuschke-Voigt	9 May 1983	189 cm (6 ft 2 in)	75 kg (165 lb)	310 cm (10 ft 2 in)	298 cm (9 ft 9 in)	Lokomotiv Baku
10	Anne Matthes	30 April 1985	182 cm (6 ft 0 in)	66 kg (146 lb)	312 cm (10 ft 3 in)	295 cm (9 ft 8 in)	Dresdner SC
11	Christiane Fürst	29 March 1985	193 cm (6 ft 4 in)	80 kg (180 lb)	323 cm (10 ft 7 in)	307 cm (10 ft 1 in)	Eczasibasi Istanbul
12	Heike Beier	9 December 1983	184 cm (6 ft 0 in)	73 kg (161 lb)	305 cm (10 ft 0 in)	293 cm (9 ft 7 in)	BKF Aluprof Bielsko Biala
13	Saskia Hippe	16 January 1991	185 cm (6 ft 1 in)	67 kg (148 lb)	315 cm (10 ft 4 in)	292 cm (9 ft 7 in)	Schweriner SC
14	Margareta Kozuch	30 October 1986	187 cm (6 ft 2 in)	70 kg (150 lb)	309 cm (10 ft 2 in)	297 cm (9 ft 9 in)	RebecchiNordameccanica Piacenz
15	Lisa Thomsen	20 August 1985	172 cm (5 ft 8 in)	68 kg (150 lb)	290 cm (9 ft 6 in)	285 cm (9 ft 4 in)	Lokomotiv Baku
16	Lena Möllers	6 January 1990	188 cm (6 ft 2 in)	74 kg (163 lb)	312 cm (10 ft 3 in)	297 cm (9 ft 9 in)	Neruda Volley Bolzano
17	Carina Aulenbrock	22 September 1994	190 cm (6 ft 3 in)	80 kg (180 lb)	310 cm (10 ft 2 in)	291 cm (9 ft 7 in)	Schweriner SC
18	Regina Burchardt	1 July 1983	186 cm (6 ft 1 in)	77 kg (170 lb)	302 cm (9 ft 11 in)	294 cm (9 ft 8 in)	VC Wiesbaden
19	Svenja Engelhardt	20 April 1988	182 cm (6 ft 0 in)	71 kg (157 lb)	304 cm (10 ft 0 in)	288 cm (9 ft 5 in)	Allianz MTV Stuttgart
20	Mareen Apitz	26 March 1987	183 cm (6 ft 0 in)	73 kg (161 lb)	295 cm (9 ft 8 in)	284 cm (9 ft 4 in)	RC Cannes
21	Jennifer Geerties	5 April 1994	184 cm (6 ft 0 in)	58 kg (128 lb)	298 cm (9 ft 9 in)	288 cm (9 ft 5 in)	Schweriner SC
22	Lisa Izquierdo	29 August 1994	178 cm (5 ft 10 in)	78 kg (172 lb)	309 cm (10 ft 2 in)	294 cm (9 ft 8 in)	Dresdner SC

== Italy ==
The following is the Italy roster in the 2013 FIVB World Grand Prix.

#	Name	Date of Birth	Height	Weight	Spike	Block	Club
1	Indre Sorokaite	2 July 1988	188 cm (6 ft 2 in)	80 kg (180 lb)	300 cm (9 ft 10 in)	280 cm (9 ft 2 in)	Fenerbahce Istanbul
2	Cristina Barcellini	20 November 1986	183 cm (6 ft 0 in)	78 kg (172 lb)	307 cm (10 ft 1 in)	292 cm (9 ft 7 in)	Imoco Volley Conegliano
3	Immacolata Sirressi	19 May 1990	175 cm (5 ft 9 in)	62 kg (137 lb)	284 cm (9 ft 4 in)	260 cm (8 ft 6 in)	Duck Farm Chieri Torino
4	Letizia Camera	1 October 1992	175 cm (5 ft 9 in)	62 kg (137 lb)	285 cm (9 ft 4 in)	270 cm (8 ft 10 in)	Imoco Volley Conegliano
5	Enrica Merlo	28 December 1988	170 cm (5 ft 7 in)	60 kg (130 lb)	281 cm (9 ft 3 in)	262 cm (8 ft 7 in)	Foppapedretti Bergamo
6	Monica De Gennaro	8 January 1987	174 cm (5 ft 9 in)	67 kg (148 lb)	292 cm (9 ft 7 in)	270 cm (8 ft 10 in)	Imoco Conegliano
7	Martina Guiggi	1 May 1984	187 cm (6 ft 2 in)	80 kg (180 lb)	315 cm (10 ft 4 in)	290 cm (9 ft 6 in)	Guangdong Evergrande
8	Noemi Signorile	15 February 1990	182 cm (6 ft 0 in)	70 kg (150 lb)	294 cm (9 ft 8 in)	290 cm (9 ft 6 in)	Igor Volley Novara
9	Caterina Bosetti	2 February 1994	179 cm (5 ft 10 in)	59 kg (130 lb)	299 cm (9 ft 10 in)	281 cm (9 ft 3 in)	Galatasaray Istanbul
10	Cristina Chirichella	10 February 1994	195 cm (6 ft 5 in)	73 kg (161 lb)	314 cm (10 ft 4 in)	296 cm (9 ft 9 in)	Igor Volley Novara
11	Chiara Di Iulio	5 May 1985	184 cm (6 ft 0 in)	65 kg (143 lb)	291 cm (9 ft 7 in)	278 cm (9 ft 1 in)	Foppapedretti Bergamo
12	Valentina Zago	21 February 1990	186 cm (6 ft 1 in)	77 kg (170 lb)	305 cm (10 ft 0 in)	284 cm (9 ft 4 in)	Pomì Casalmaggiore
13	Valentina Arrighetti	26 January 1985	185 cm (6 ft 1 in)	72 kg (159 lb)	318 cm (10 ft 5 in)	310 cm (10 ft 2 in)	Lokomotiv Baku
14	Valeria Caracuta	14 December 1987	173 cm (5 ft 8 in)	65 kg (143 lb)	285 cm (9 ft 4 in)	274 cm (9 ft 0 in)	Unendo Yamamay Busto Arsizio
15	Floriana Bertone	19 November 1992	202 cm (6 ft 8 in)	80 kg (180 lb)	316 cm (10 ft 4 in)	300 cm (9 ft 10 in)	Il Bisonte San Casciano
16	Lucia Bosetti	9 July 1989	175 cm (5 ft 9 in)	65 kg (143 lb)	316 cm (10 ft 4 in)	286 cm (9 ft 5 in)	Nordmeccanica Piacenza
17	Valentina Diouf	10 January 1993	202 cm (6 ft 8 in)	94 kg (207 lb)	320 cm (10 ft 6 in)	303 cm (9 ft 11 in)	Yamamay Busto Arsizio
18	Carolina Del Pilar Costagrande	15 October 1980	187 cm (6 ft 2 in)	90 kg (200 lb)	320 cm (10 ft 6 in)	310 cm (10 ft 2 in)	VakifBank Istanbul
19	Raphaela Folie	7 March 1991	186 cm (6 ft 1 in)	82 kg (181 lb)	307 cm (10 ft 1 in)	283 cm (9 ft 3 in)	Liu Jo Modena
20	Alessia Gennari	3 November 1991	184 cm (6 ft 0 in)	68 kg (150 lb)	302 cm (9 ft 11 in)	284 cm (9 ft 4 in)	Duck Farm Chieri Torino
21	Valentina Fiorin	9 October 1984	184 cm (6 ft 0 in)	82 kg (181 lb)	320 cm (10 ft 6 in)	310 cm (10 ft 2 in)	Imoco Volley Conegliano
22	Valentina Tirozzi	26 March 1986	181 cm (5 ft 11 in)	69 kg (152 lb)	296 cm (9 ft 9 in)	277 cm (9 ft 1 in)	KGS Robursport

== Japan ==
- Head Coach:

The following is the Japan roster in the 2013 FIVB World Grand Prix.

#	Name	Date of Birth	Height	Weight	Spike	Block	Club
1	Miyu Nagaoka	25 July 1991	179 cm (5 ft 10 in)	68 kg (150 lb)	310 cm (10 ft 2 in)	298 cm (9 ft 9 in)	Hisamitsu Springs
2	Arisa Sato	18 July 1989	164 cm (5 ft 5 in)	53 kg (117 lb)	275 cm (9 ft 0 in)	268 cm (8 ft 10 in)	Hitachi Rivale
3	Saori Kimura	19 August 1986	185 cm (6 ft 1 in)	65 kg (143 lb)	304 cm (10 ft 0 in)	293 cm (9 ft 7 in)	Toray Arrows
4	Kanako Hirai	15 April 1984	183 cm (6 ft 0 in)	69 kg (152 lb)	309 cm (10 ft 2 in)	290 cm (9 ft 6 in)	Hisamitsu Springs
5	Naoko Hashimoto	11 July 1984	172 cm (5 ft 8 in)	68 kg (150 lb)	288 cm (9 ft 5 in)	268 cm (8 ft 10 in)	JT Marvelous
6	Haruka Miyashita	1 September 1994	177 cm (5 ft 10 in)	61 kg (134 lb)	298 cm (9 ft 9 in)	272 cm (8 ft 11 in)	Okayama Seagulls
7	Mami Yoshida	5 June 1986	158 cm (5 ft 2 in)	57 kg (126 lb)	272 cm (8 ft 11 in)	260 cm (8 ft 6 in)	Pioneer Red Wings
8	Kotoki Zayasu	11 January 1990	159 cm (5 ft 3 in)	57 kg (126 lb)	270 cm (8 ft 10 in)	255 cm (8 ft 4 in)	Hisamitsu Springs
9	Mizuho Ishida	22 January 1988	174 cm (5 ft 9 in)	65 kg (143 lb)	301 cm (9 ft 11 in)	286 cm (9 ft 5 in)	Denso Airybees
10	Nana Iwasaka	3 July 1990	187 cm (6 ft 2 in)	72 kg (159 lb)	300 cm (9 ft 10 in)	285 cm (9 ft 4 in)	Hisamitsu Seiyaku Springs
11	Makoto Matsuura	9 September 1986	173 cm (5 ft 8 in)	69 kg (152 lb)	282 cm (9 ft 3 in)	265 cm (8 ft 8 in)	NEC Red Rockets
12	Yuki Ishii	8 May 1991	180 cm (5 ft 11 in)	68 kg (150 lb)	302 cm (9 ft 11 in)	286 cm (9 ft 5 in)	Hisamitsu Springs
13	Risa Shinnabe	11 July 1990	173 cm (5 ft 8 in)	66 kg (146 lb)	295 cm (9 ft 8 in)	268 cm (8 ft 10 in)	Hisamitsu Seiyaku Springs
14	Yukiko Ebata	7 November 1989	176 cm (5 ft 9 in)	67 kg (148 lb)	305 cm (10 ft 0 in)	298 cm (9 ft 9 in)	Racing Club Cannes
15	Haruyo Shimamura	4 March 1992	182 cm (6 ft 0 in)	79 kg (174 lb)	299 cm (9 ft 10 in)	290 cm (9 ft 6 in)	Nec Red Rockets
16	Saori Sakoda	18 December 1987	175 cm (5 ft 9 in)	63 kg (139 lb)	305 cm (10 ft 0 in)	279 cm (9 ft 2 in)	Toray Arrows
17	Akari Oumi	10 November 1989	171 cm (5 ft 7 in)	64 kg (141 lb)	297 cm (9 ft 9 in)	276 cm (9 ft 1 in)	NEC Red Rockets
18	Saori Takahashi	9 December 1992	177 cm (5 ft 10 in)	68 kg (150 lb)	298 cm (9 ft 9 in)	280 cm (9 ft 2 in)	Hitachi Rivale
19	Riho Otake	23 December 1993	182 cm (6 ft 0 in)	68 kg (150 lb)	306 cm (10 ft 0 in)	296 cm (9 ft 9 in)	Denso Airybees
20	Aimi Kawashima	15 April 1990	181 cm (5 ft 11 in)	67 kg (148 lb)	299 cm (9 ft 10 in)	275 cm (9 ft 0 in)	Okayama Seagulls
21	Kanami Tashiro	25 March 1991	173 cm (5 ft 8 in)	70 kg (150 lb)	280 cm (9 ft 2 in)	273 cm (8 ft 11 in)	Toray Arrows
22	Fumika Moriya	7 April 1992	180 cm (5 ft 11 in)	75 kg (165 lb)	302 cm (9 ft 11 in)	286 cm (9 ft 5 in)	Hisamitsu Seiyaku Springs

== Kazakhstan ==
The following is the Kazakhstan roster in the 2013 FIVB World Grand Prix.

#	Name	Date of Birth	Height	Weight	Spike	Block	Club
1	Tatyana Mudritskaya	17 January 1985	195 cm (6 ft 5 in)	77 kg (170 lb)	310 cm (10 ft 2 in)	300 cm (9 ft 10 in)	Apollon Limassoll
2	Lyudmila Issayeva	26 September 1989	184 cm (6 ft 0 in)	70 kg (150 lb)	295 cm (9 ft 8 in)	280 cm (9 ft 2 in)	ALMATY
3	Sana Anarkulova	21 July 1989	188 cm (6 ft 2 in)	77 kg (170 lb)	300 cm (9 ft 10 in)	280 cm (9 ft 2 in)	ALMATY
4	Lyudmila Anarbayeva	12 November 1983	192 cm (6 ft 4 in)	72 kg (159 lb)	305 cm (10 ft 0 in)	299 cm (9 ft 10 in)	Zhetyssu
5	Olga Nassedkina	28 December 1982	190 cm (6 ft 3 in)	75 kg (165 lb)	305 cm (10 ft 0 in)	255 cm (8 ft 4 in)	ZHETYSSU
6	Natalya Akilova	31 May 1993	183 cm (6 ft 0 in)	62 kg (137 lb)	295 cm (9 ft 8 in)	275 cm (9 ft 0 in)	KARAGANDA
7	Alena Ivanova	19 June 1989	195 cm (6 ft 5 in)	78 kg (172 lb)	310 cm (10 ft 2 in)	300 cm (9 ft 10 in)	Zhetyssu
8	Korinna Ishimtseva	8 February 1984	187 cm (6 ft 2 in)	69 kg (152 lb)	300 cm (9 ft 10 in)	280 cm (9 ft 2 in)	Zhetyssu
9	Irina Lukomskaya	19 March 1991	176 cm (5 ft 9 in)	66 kg (146 lb)	280 cm (9 ft 2 in)	270 cm (8 ft 10 in)	Voronezh
10	Irina Shenberger	20 February 1992	180 cm (5 ft 11 in)	73 kg (161 lb)	290 cm (9 ft 6 in)	280 cm (9 ft 2 in)	Astana
11	Marina Storozhenko	6 June 1985	175 cm (5 ft 9 in)	57 kg (126 lb)	290 cm (9 ft 6 in)	280 cm (9 ft 2 in)	Zhetyssu
12	Yekaterina Zhdanova	28 May 1992	183 cm (6 ft 0 in)	65 kg (143 lb)	280 cm (9 ft 2 in)	270 cm (8 ft 10 in)	Karaganda
13	Yana Yagodina	24 January 1993	182 cm (6 ft 0 in)	69 kg (152 lb)	300 cm (9 ft 10 in)	285 cm (9 ft 4 in)	Almaty
14	Alessya Safronova	10 February 1986	175 cm (5 ft 9 in)	57 kg (126 lb)	290 cm (9 ft 6 in)	280 cm (9 ft 2 in)	Iller Bankasi
15	Anastassiya Rostovchshikova	17 April 1994	180 cm (5 ft 11 in)	64 kg (141 lb)	280 cm (9 ft 2 in)	260 cm (8 ft 6 in)	KOSTANAY
16	Inna Matveyeva	12 October 1978	186 cm (6 ft 1 in)	70 kg (150 lb)	303 cm (9 ft 11 in)	294 cm (9 ft 8 in)	Irtysh-Kazchrom
17	Yekaterina Razorenkova	3 June 1993	185 cm (6 ft 1 in)	69 kg (152 lb)	283 cm (9 ft 3 in)	280 cm (9 ft 2 in)	Almaty
18	Yelena Gordeyeva	23 November 1988	178 cm (5 ft 10 in)	72 kg (159 lb)	280 cm (9 ft 2 in)	275 cm (9 ft 0 in)	Almaty
19	Zarina Sitkazinova	20 March 1993	182 cm (6 ft 0 in)	70 kg (150 lb)	295 cm (9 ft 8 in)	280 cm (9 ft 2 in)	Astana
20	Tatyana Fendrikova	23 February 1990	169 cm (5 ft 7 in)	55 kg (121 lb)	280 cm (9 ft 2 in)	275 cm (9 ft 0 in)	Almaty

== Netherlands ==
The following is the Netherlands roster in the 2013 FIVB World Grand Prix.

#	Name	Date of Birth	Height	Weight	Spike	Block	Club
1	Kim Staelens	7 January 1982	182 cm (6 ft 0 in)	78 kg (172 lb)	305 cm (10 ft 0 in)	301 cm (9 ft 11 in)	Stiinta Bacau
2	Femke Stoltenborg	30 July 1991	189 cm (6 ft 2 in)	81 kg (179 lb)	303 cm (9 ft 11 in)	299 cm (9 ft 10 in)	MTV Stuttgart
3	Yvon Belien	28 December 1993	188 cm (6 ft 2 in)	73 kg (161 lb)	307 cm (10 ft 1 in)	303 cm (9 ft 11 in)	Piacenza
4	Celeste Plak	26 October 1995	190 cm (6 ft 3 in)	87 kg (192 lb)	314 cm (10 ft 4 in)	302 cm (9 ft 11 in)	Volley Bergamo
5	Robin De Kruijf	5 May 1991	192 cm (6 ft 4 in)	81 kg (179 lb)	313 cm (10 ft 3 in)	300 cm (9 ft 10 in)	VakifBank Istanbul
6	Maret Balkestein-Grothues	16 September 1988	180 cm (5 ft 11 in)	68 kg (150 lb)	304 cm (10 ft 0 in)	285 cm (9 ft 4 in)	PGE Atom
7	Quinta Steenbergen	2 April 1985	189 cm (6 ft 2 in)	75 kg (165 lb)	309 cm (10 ft 2 in)	300 cm (9 ft 10 in)	VK Agel Prostejov
8	Judith Pietersen	3 July 1989	188 cm (6 ft 2 in)	73 kg (161 lb)	306 cm (10 ft 0 in)	296 cm (9 ft 9 in)	Scandicci
9	Myrthe Schoot	29 August 1988	182 cm (6 ft 0 in)	70 kg (150 lb)	298 cm (9 ft 9 in)	286 cm (9 ft 5 in)	Dresdner SC
10	Lonneke Slöetjes	15 November 1990	191 cm (6 ft 3 in)	76 kg (168 lb)	322 cm (10 ft 7 in)	315 cm (10 ft 4 in)	Vakifbank Istanbul
11	Anne Buijs	2 December 1991	191 cm (6 ft 3 in)	73 kg (161 lb)	317 cm (10 ft 5 in)	299 cm (9 ft 10 in)	Vakifbank Istanbul
12	Manon Nummerdor-Flier	8 February 1984	192 cm (6 ft 4 in)	71 kg (157 lb)	315 cm (10 ft 4 in)	301 cm (9 ft 11 in)	Zhengrong Fujian
13	Flore Gravesteijn	26 April 1987	189 cm (6 ft 2 in)	68 kg (150 lb)	303 cm (9 ft 11 in)	291 cm (9 ft 7 in)	Saint-Cloud Paris SF
14	Laura Dijkema	18 February 1990	184 cm (6 ft 0 in)	70 kg (150 lb)	293 cm (9 ft 7 in)	279 cm (9 ft 2 in)	Dresdner SC
16	Kim Renkema	28 June 1987	179 cm (5 ft 10 in)	67 kg (148 lb)	295 cm (9 ft 8 in)	282 cm (9 ft 3 in)	Allianz MTV Stuttgart
17	Moniek Jansen	26 August 1992	192 cm (6 ft 4 in)	86 kg (190 lb)	298 cm (9 ft 9 in)	285 cm (9 ft 4 in)	Alterno
18	Lynn Thijssen	22 August 1992	187 cm (6 ft 2 in)	73 kg (161 lb)	298 cm (9 ft 9 in)	284 cm (9 ft 4 in)	Sliedrecht Sport
19	Kirsten Knip	14 September 1992	175 cm (5 ft 9 in)	70 kg (150 lb)	281 cm (9 ft 3 in)	275 cm (9 ft 0 in)	Rote Raben Vilsbiburg
20	Quirine Oosterveld	5 March 1990	181 cm (5 ft 11 in)	70 kg (150 lb)	296 cm (9 ft 9 in)	288 cm (9 ft 5 in)	Vilsbiburg
21	Esther Van Berkel	31 August 1990	176 cm (5 ft 9 in)	68 kg (150 lb)	301 cm (9 ft 11 in)	287 cm (9 ft 5 in)	Saint-Cloud Paris SF
22	Inge Molendijk	9 December 1992	186 cm (6 ft 1 in)	76 kg (168 lb)	287 cm (9 ft 5 in)	284 cm (9 ft 4 in)	Istres Ouest Provence
23	Klaske Sikkes	7 April 1993	188 cm (6 ft 2 in)	74 kg (163 lb)	299 cm (9 ft 10 in)	286 cm (9 ft 5 in)	VC Sneek

== Poland ==
The following is the Poland roster in the 2013 FIVB World Grand Prix.

- Head coach: Piotr Makowski

#	Name	Date of Birth	Height	Weight	Spike	Block	Club
1	Anna Grejman	8 June 1993	183 cm (6 ft 0 in)	67 kg (148 lb)	302 cm (9 ft 11 in)	283 cm (9 ft 3 in)	Impel
2	Maja Tokarska	22 February 1991	194 cm (6 ft 4 in)	79 kg (174 lb)	317 cm (10 ft 5 in)	293 cm (9 ft 7 in)	Tauron MKS
3	Karolina Rozycka	28 June 1985	183 cm (6 ft 0 in)	68 kg (150 lb)	305 cm (10 ft 0 in)	284 cm (9 ft 4 in)	Yesilyurt
4	Izabela Belcik	29 November 1980	185 cm (6 ft 1 in)	65 kg (143 lb)	304 cm (10 ft 0 in)	292 cm (9 ft 7 in)	Atom Trefl
5	Patrycja Polak	23 February 1991	183 cm (6 ft 0 in)	62 kg (137 lb)	301 cm (9 ft 11 in)	279 cm (9 ft 2 in)	Impel Volleyball
6	Aleksandra Wojcik	3 January 1994	184 cm (6 ft 0 in)	76 kg (168 lb)	297 cm (9 ft 9 in)	279 cm (9 ft 2 in)	Legionovia SA
7	Joanna Kaczor	16 September 1984	191 cm (6 ft 3 in)	64 kg (141 lb)	305 cm (10 ft 0 in)	290 cm (9 ft 6 in)	Tauron MKS
8	Zuzanna Efimienko	8 August 1989	197 cm (6 ft 6 in)	72 kg (159 lb)	318 cm (10 ft 5 in)	303 cm (9 ft 11 in)	Atom Trefl
9	Ewelina Sieczka	26 January 1988	182 cm (6 ft 0 in)	68 kg (150 lb)	308 cm (10 ft 1 in)	280 cm (9 ft 2 in)	Budowlani
10	Krystyna Strasz	24 July 1987	165 cm (5 ft 5 in)	55 kg (121 lb)	0 cm (0 in)	252 cm (8 ft 3 in)	Tauron MKS
11	Kinga Kasprzak	12 June 1987	188 cm (6 ft 2 in)	76 kg (168 lb)	310 cm (10 ft 2 in)	295 cm (9 ft 8 in)	Bank BPS Muszynianka
12	Milena Radecka	18 October 1984	177 cm (5 ft 10 in)	65 kg (143 lb)	302 cm (9 ft 11 in)	295 cm (9 ft 8 in)	Azerrail
13	Paulina Maj	22 March 1987	166 cm (5 ft 5 in)	58 kg (128 lb)	277 cm (9 ft 1 in)	255 cm (8 ft 4 in)	Bank BPS Muszynianka Fakro
14	Joanna Wolosz	7 April 1990	181 cm (5 ft 11 in)	65 kg (143 lb)	303 cm (9 ft 11 in)	281 cm (9 ft 3 in)	Yamamay Busto Arsizio
15	Agnieszka Kakolewska	17 October 1994	197 cm (6 ft 6 in)	75 kg (165 lb)	309 cm (10 ft 2 in)	295 cm (9 ft 8 in)	Impel
16	Elzbieta Skowronska	6 July 1983	183 cm (6 ft 0 in)	71 kg (157 lb)	305 cm (10 ft 0 in)	280 cm (9 ft 2 in)	Canakkale
17	Katarzyna Skowronska-Dolata	30 June 1983	189 cm (6 ft 2 in)	75 kg (165 lb)	314 cm (10 ft 4 in)	296 cm (9 ft 9 in)	Rabita Baku
18	Katarzyna Konieczna	22 March 1985	184 cm (6 ft 0 in)	75 kg (165 lb)	304 cm (10 ft 0 in)	288 cm (9 ft 5 in)	Impel Volleyball
19	Monika Ptak	14 May 1990	187 cm (6 ft 2 in)	72 kg (159 lb)	310 cm (10 ft 2 in)	289 cm (9 ft 6 in)	PTPS
20	Dorota Medynska	25 April 1993	168 cm (5 ft 6 in)	60 kg (130 lb)	280 cm (9 ft 2 in)	261 cm (8 ft 7 in)	Impel
21	Aleksandra Sikorska	28 April 1993	185 cm (6 ft 1 in)	67 kg (148 lb)	306 cm (10 ft 0 in)	286 cm (9 ft 5 in)	Budowlani
22	Justyna Lukasik	27 January 1993	187 cm (6 ft 2 in)	77 kg (170 lb)	301 cm (9 ft 11 in)	285 cm (9 ft 4 in)	Atom Trefl

== Puerto Rico ==
The following is the Puerto Rico roster in the 2013 FIVB World Grand Prix.

#	Name	Date of Birth	Height	Weight	Spike	Block	Club
1	Debora Seilhamer	4 October 1985	166 cm (5 ft 5 in)	61 kg (134 lb)	245 cm (8 ft 0 in)	240 cm (7 ft 10 in)	Cataño
2	Shara Venegas	18 September 1992	173 cm (5 ft 8 in)	68 kg (150 lb)	280 cm (9 ft 2 in)	272 cm (8 ft 11 in)	Caguas
3	Vilmarie Mojica	13 August 1985	180 cm (5 ft 11 in)	63 kg (139 lb)	295 cm (9 ft 8 in)	288 cm (9 ft 5 in)	Caguas
4	Bianca Rivera	4 October 1987	178 cm (5 ft 10 in)	89 kg (196 lb)	280 cm (9 ft 2 in)	276 cm (9 ft 1 in)	Bayamon
5	Sarai Alvarez	3 April 1986	183 cm (6 ft 0 in)	61 kg (134 lb)	295 cm (9 ft 8 in)	286 cm (9 ft 5 in)	Mayaguez
6	Yarimar Rosa	20 June 1988	178 cm (5 ft 10 in)	62 kg (137 lb)	295 cm (9 ft 8 in)	285 cm (9 ft 4 in)	Mayaguez
7	Stephanie Enright	15 December 1990	179 cm (5 ft 10 in)	56 kg (123 lb)	300 cm (9 ft 10 in)	292 cm (9 ft 7 in)	Caguas
8	Ania Ruiz	11 July 1982	182 cm (6 ft 0 in)	68 kg (150 lb)	305 cm (10 ft 0 in)	284 cm (9 ft 4 in)	Bayamon
9	Aurea Cruz	10 January 1982	180 cm (5 ft 11 in)	63 kg (139 lb)	310 cm (10 ft 2 in)	290 cm (9 ft 6 in)	Carolina
10	Genesis Collazo	4 October 1992	185 cm (6 ft 1 in)	74 kg (163 lb)	301 cm (9 ft 11 in)	296 cm (9 ft 9 in)	Caguas
11	Karina Ocasio	1 August 1985	192 cm (6 ft 4 in)	76 kg (168 lb)	298 cm (9 ft 9 in)	288 cm (9 ft 5 in)	Caguas
12	Michelle Nogueras	5 December 1988	179 cm (5 ft 10 in)	58 kg (128 lb)	275 cm (9 ft 0 in)	262 cm (8 ft 7 in)	Carolina
13	Remy June Mcbain	27 August 1991	188 cm (6 ft 2 in)	68 kg (150 lb)	299 cm (9 ft 10 in)	289 cm (9 ft 6 in)	Mayaguez
14	Natalia Valentin	12 September 1989	170 cm (5 ft 7 in)	61 kg (134 lb)	244 cm (8 ft 0 in)	240 cm (7 ft 10 in)	Ponce
15	Daly Santana	19 February 1995	185 cm (6 ft 1 in)	65 kg (143 lb)	300 cm (9 ft 10 in)	274 cm (9 ft 0 in)	National Team
16	Patricia Montero	22 August 1997	178 cm (5 ft 10 in)	58 kg (128 lb)	225 cm (7 ft 5 in)	224 cm (7 ft 4 in)	National Team
17	Sheila Ocasio	17 November 1982	195 cm (6 ft 5 in)	74 kg (163 lb)	310 cm (10 ft 2 in)	292 cm (9 ft 7 in)	Juncos
18	Lynda Morales	20 May 1988	188 cm (6 ft 2 in)	74 kg (163 lb)	302 cm (9 ft 11 in)	296 cm (9 ft 9 in)	Guaynabo
19	Kanisha Jimenez	28 November 1995	185 cm (6 ft 1 in)	56 kg (123 lb)	295 cm (9 ft 8 in)	291 cm (9 ft 7 in)	National Team
20	Jennifer Quesada	22 February 1992	188 cm (6 ft 2 in)	71 kg (157 lb)	299 cm (9 ft 10 in)	295 cm (9 ft 8 in)	Bayamon
21	Diana Reyes	29 April 1993	191 cm (6 ft 3 in)	80 kg (180 lb)	303 cm (9 ft 11 in)	299 cm (9 ft 10 in)	Caguas
22	Maria Escoto	23 March 1991	152 cm (5 ft 0 in)	58 kg (128 lb)	285 cm (9 ft 4 in)	274 cm (9 ft 0 in)	Bayamon

== Russia ==
The following is the Russia roster in the 2013 FIVB World Grand Prix.

#	Name	Date of Birth	Height	Weight	Spike	Block	Club
1	Maria Borodakova	8 March 1986	190 cm (6 ft 3 in)	88 kg (194 lb)	301 cm (9 ft 11 in)	297 cm (9 ft 9 in)	Dinamo-Kazan
2	Anastasia Salina	30 December 1988	181 cm (5 ft 11 in)	67 kg (148 lb)	295 cm (9 ft 8 in)	288 cm (9 ft 5 in)	Uralochka-UGMK
3	Daria Isaeva	29 March 1990	186 cm (6 ft 1 in)	75 kg (165 lb)	310 cm (10 ft 2 in)	304 cm (10 ft 0 in)	Omichka-Omsk
4	Irina Zaryazhko	4 October 1991	196 cm (6 ft 5 in)	78 kg (172 lb)	305 cm (10 ft 0 in)	290 cm (9 ft 6 in)	Uralochka
5	Alexandra Pasynkova	14 April 1987	190 cm (6 ft 3 in)	75 kg (165 lb)	313 cm (10 ft 3 in)	305 cm (10 ft 0 in)	Dinamo Krasnodar
6	Anna Matienko	12 July 1981	182 cm (6 ft 0 in)	68 kg (150 lb)	298 cm (9 ft 9 in)	292 cm (9 ft 7 in)	Uralochka
7	Svetlana Kryuchkova	21 February 1985	174 cm (5 ft 9 in)	63 kg (139 lb)	290 cm (9 ft 6 in)	286 cm (9 ft 5 in)	Dinamo Krasnodar
8	Nataliya Goncharova	1 June 1989	196 cm (6 ft 5 in)	75 kg (165 lb)	315 cm (10 ft 4 in)	306 cm (10 ft 0 in)	Dinamo Moscow
9	Kseniia Bondar	1 February 1990	190 cm (6 ft 3 in)	73 kg (161 lb)	305 cm (10 ft 0 in)	300 cm (9 ft 10 in)	Fakel
10	Ekaterina Kosianenko	2 February 1990	178 cm (5 ft 10 in)	64 kg (141 lb)	290 cm (9 ft 6 in)	285 cm (9 ft 4 in)	Zarechie-Odinzovo
11	Victoriia Chaplina	23 October 1988	188 cm (6 ft 2 in)	77 kg (170 lb)	301 cm (9 ft 11 in)	295 cm (9 ft 8 in)	Uralochka-NTMK
12	Ekaterina Orlova	21 October 1987	193 cm (6 ft 4 in)	77 kg (170 lb)	307 cm (10 ft 1 in)	301 cm (9 ft 11 in)	Omichka Omsk
13	Evgeniya Startseva	12 February 1989	185 cm (6 ft 1 in)	68 kg (150 lb)	294 cm (9 ft 8 in)	290 cm (9 ft 6 in)	Dinamo-Kazan
14	Natalia Dianskaia	7 March 1989	185 cm (6 ft 1 in)	69 kg (152 lb)	297 cm (9 ft 9 in)	292 cm (9 ft 7 in)	Severstal
15	Tatiana Kosheleva	23 December 1988	191 cm (6 ft 3 in)	71 kg (157 lb)	325 cm (10 ft 8 in)	315 cm (10 ft 4 in)	Dinamo Krasnodar
16	Regina Moroz	14 January 1987	188 cm (6 ft 2 in)	70 kg (150 lb)	310 cm (10 ft 2 in)	303 cm (9 ft 11 in)	Dinamo-Kazan
17	Natalia Malykh	8 December 1993	187 cm (6 ft 2 in)	65 kg (143 lb)	308 cm (10 ft 1 in)	297 cm (9 ft 9 in)	Zarechie-Odinzovo
18	Alexandra Vinogradova	11 April 1988	175 cm (5 ft 9 in)	72 kg (159 lb)	295 cm (9 ft 8 in)	287 cm (9 ft 5 in)	Zarechie-Odinzovo
19	Anna Malova	16 April 1990	175 cm (5 ft 9 in)	59 kg (130 lb)	286 cm (9 ft 5 in)	290 cm (9 ft 6 in)	Dinamo Moscow
20	Anastasia Shlyakhovaya	5 October 1990	192 cm (6 ft 4 in)	69 kg (152 lb)	313 cm (10 ft 3 in)	307 cm (10 ft 1 in)	Omichka Omsk
21	Valeriya Goncharova	3 January 1988	188 cm (6 ft 2 in)	70 kg (150 lb)	308 cm (10 ft 1 in)	301 cm (9 ft 11 in)	Dinamo-Moscow
22	Elena Novik	23 March 1994	180 cm (5 ft 11 in)	66 kg (146 lb)	295 cm (9 ft 8 in)	290 cm (9 ft 6 in)	Proton

== Serbia ==
The following is the Serbia roster in the 2013 FIVB World Grand Prix.

#	Name	Date of Birth	Height	Weight	Spike	Block	Club
1	Ana Lazarevic	4 July 1991	186 cm (6 ft 1 in)	74 kg (163 lb)	280 cm (9 ft 2 in)	268 cm (8 ft 10 in)	BESIKTAS Istanbul (TUR)
2	Jovana Brakocevic	5 March 1988	196 cm (6 ft 5 in)	82 kg (181 lb)	309 cm (10 ft 2 in)	295 cm (9 ft 8 in)	VAKIFBANK Istanbul (TUR)
3	Sanja Malagurski	8 June 1990	193 cm (6 ft 4 in)	74 kg (163 lb)	305 cm (10 ft 0 in)	295 cm (9 ft 8 in)	OSASCO VC (BRA)
4	Bojana Zivkovic	29 March 1988	186 cm (6 ft 1 in)	72 kg (159 lb)	292 cm (9 ft 7 in)	284 cm (9 ft 4 in)	ILLER Bankasi Istanbul (TUR)
5	Natasa Krsmanovic	19 June 1985	188 cm (6 ft 2 in)	73 kg (161 lb)	305 cm (10 ft 0 in)	285 cm (9 ft 4 in)	RABITA Baku (AZE)
6	Tijana Malesevic	18 March 1991	184 cm (6 ft 0 in)	73 kg (161 lb)	289 cm (9 ft 6 in)	288 cm (9 ft 5 in)	VK PROSTEJOV (CZE)
7	Brizitka Molnar	28 July 1985	182 cm (6 ft 0 in)	69 kg (152 lb)	304 cm (10 ft 0 in)	290 cm (9 ft 6 in)	ATOM TREFL (POL)
8	Olga Raonic	31 December 1986	184 cm (6 ft 0 in)	70 kg (150 lb)	294 cm (9 ft 8 in)	280 cm (9 ft 2 in)	NIS SPARTAK Subotica (SRB)
9	Brankica Mihajlovic	13 April 1991	190 cm (6 ft 3 in)	83 kg (183 lb)	282 cm (9 ft 3 in)	264 cm (8 ft 8 in)	Hisamitsu Seiyaku Springs
10	Maja Ognjenovic	6 August 1984	183 cm (6 ft 0 in)	67 kg (148 lb)	290 cm (9 ft 6 in)	270 cm (8 ft 10 in)	CHEMIC Police SA (POL)
11	Stefana Veljkovic	9 January 1990	190 cm (6 ft 3 in)	76 kg (168 lb)	320 cm (10 ft 6 in)	305 cm (10 ft 0 in)	GALATASARAY Istanbul (TUR)
12	Jelena Nikolic	13 April 1982	194 cm (6 ft 4 in)	79 kg (174 lb)	315 cm (10 ft 4 in)	300 cm (9 ft 10 in)	VAKIFBANK Istanbul (TUR)
13	Ana Bjelica	3 April 1992	190 cm (6 ft 3 in)	78 kg (172 lb)	310 cm (10 ft 2 in)	305 cm (10 ft 0 in)	CHEMIC Police SA (POL)
14	Nadja Ninkovic	1 November 1991	192 cm (6 ft 4 in)	77 kg (170 lb)	307 cm (10 ft 1 in)	298 cm (9 ft 9 in)	Volero Zürich
15	Jovana Stevanovic	30 June 1992	192 cm (6 ft 4 in)	72 kg (159 lb)	308 cm (10 ft 1 in)	295 cm (9 ft 8 in)	VBC Pallavollo Rosa ssdrl (ITA
16	Milena Rasic	25 October 1990	191 cm (6 ft 3 in)	72 kg (159 lb)	303 cm (9 ft 11 in)	293 cm (9 ft 7 in)	RC CANNES Cannes (FRA)
17	Silvija Popovic	15 March 1986	178 cm (5 ft 10 in)	65 kg (143 lb)	276 cm (9 ft 1 in)	266 cm (8 ft 9 in)	Volero Zürich (SUI)
18	Suzana Cebic	9 November 1984	167 cm (5 ft 6 in)	60 kg (130 lb)	279 cm (9 ft 2 in)	255 cm (8 ft 4 in)	LOKOMOTIV Baku (AZE)
19	Jasna Majstorovic	23 April 1984	181 cm (5 ft 11 in)	64 kg (141 lb)	300 cm (9 ft 10 in)	293 cm (9 ft 7 in)	TOMIS Constanta (ROU)
20	Sladjana Mirkovic	7 October 1995	185 cm (6 ft 1 in)	78 kg (172 lb)	293 cm (9 ft 7 in)	282 cm (9 ft 3 in)	VIZURA Beograd (SRB)
21	Bianka Busa	25 July 1994	187 cm (6 ft 2 in)	74 kg (163 lb)	293 cm (9 ft 7 in)	282 cm (9 ft 3 in)	VIZURA Beograd (SRB)
22	Tijana Bošković	8 March 1997	193 cm (6 ft 4 in)	82 kg (181 lb)	303 cm (9 ft 11 in)	295 cm (9 ft 8 in)	VIZURA Beograd (SRB)

== Thailand ==
- Head Coach: Kiattipong Radchatagriengkai

The following is the Thailand roster in the 2013 FIVB World Grand Prix.

#	Name	Date of Birth	Height	Weight	Spike	Block	Club
1	Wanna Buakaew	2 January 1981	172 cm (5 ft 8 in)	54 kg (119 lb)	292 cm (9 ft 7 in)	277 cm (9 ft 1 in)	Idea khonkaen VC
2	Piyanut Pannoy	10 November 1989	171 cm (5 ft 7 in)	68 kg (150 lb)	280 cm (9 ft 2 in)	275 cm (9 ft 0 in)	Supreme VC
3	Em-Orn Phanusit	25 March 1988	177 cm (5 ft 10 in)	70 kg (150 lb)	302 cm (9 ft 11 in)	291 cm (9 ft 7 in)	Idea Khonkaen VC
4	Thatdao Nuekjang	3 February 1994	183 cm (6 ft 0 in)	66 kg (146 lb)	305 cm (10 ft 0 in)	287 cm (9 ft 5 in)	Idea-Khonkaen VC
5	Pleumjit Thinkaow	9 November 1983	180 cm (5 ft 11 in)	63 kg (139 lb)	298 cm (9 ft 9 in)	281 cm (9 ft 3 in)	Bangkok Glass VC
6	Onuma Sittirak	13 June 1986	175 cm (5 ft 9 in)	72 kg (159 lb)	304 cm (10 ft 0 in)	285 cm (9 ft 4 in)	JT Marvelous
7	Kamonporn Sukmak	29 February 1988	174 cm (5 ft 9 in)	63 kg (139 lb)	285 cm (9 ft 4 in)	275 cm (9 ft 0 in)	Srisaket VC
8	Utaiwan Kaensing	9 July 1988	189 cm (6 ft 2 in)	86 kg (190 lb)	310 cm (10 ft 2 in)	295 cm (9 ft 8 in)	Idea Khonkaen VC
9	Wanitchaya Luangtonglang	8 October 1992	177 cm (5 ft 10 in)	60 kg (130 lb)	300 cm (9 ft 10 in)	275 cm (9 ft 0 in)	Nakhonratchasima VC
10	Wilavan Apinyapong	6 June 1984	174 cm (5 ft 9 in)	68 kg (150 lb)	294 cm (9 ft 8 in)	282 cm (9 ft 3 in)	Nakornratchasima VC
11	Amporn Hyapha	19 May 1985	180 cm (5 ft 11 in)	70 kg (150 lb)	301 cm (9 ft 11 in)	290 cm (9 ft 6 in)	Nakhonnon VC
12	Tapaphaipun Chaisri	29 November 1989	168 cm (5 ft 6 in)	60 kg (130 lb)	295 cm (9 ft 8 in)	276 cm (9 ft 1 in)	Sisaket VC
13	Nootsara Tomkom	7 July 1985	169 cm (5 ft 7 in)	57 kg (126 lb)	289 cm (9 ft 6 in)	278 cm (9 ft 1 in)	Rabita Baku
14	Jarasporn Bundasak	1 March 1993	180 cm (5 ft 11 in)	66 kg (146 lb)	290 cm (9 ft 6 in)	280 cm (9 ft 2 in)	Bangkok Glass VC
15	Malika Kanthong	8 January 1987	177 cm (5 ft 10 in)	63 kg (139 lb)	292 cm (9 ft 7 in)	278 cm (9 ft 1 in)	Nakhonnon-3BB VC
16	Pornpun Guedpard	5 May 1993	170 cm (5 ft 7 in)	63 kg (139 lb)	270 cm (8 ft 10 in)	267 cm (8 ft 9 in)	Bangkok Glass VC
17	Kaewkalaya Kamulthala	7 August 1994	178 cm (5 ft 10 in)	66 kg (146 lb)	298 cm (9 ft 9 in)	281 cm (9 ft 3 in)	Idea Khonkaen VC
18	Ajcharaporn Kongyot	18 June 1995	180 cm (5 ft 11 in)	66 kg (146 lb)	290 cm (9 ft 6 in)	284 cm (9 ft 4 in)	Supreme VC
19	Sontaya Keawbundit	9 February 1991	177 cm (5 ft 10 in)	68 kg (150 lb)	290 cm (9 ft 6 in)	280 cm (9 ft 2 in)	Idea Khonkaen VC
20	Kuttika Kaewpin	16 August 1994	168 cm (5 ft 6 in)	56 kg (123 lb)	285 cm (9 ft 4 in)	268 cm (8 ft 10 in)	Nakhonnon VC
21	Parinya Pankaew	27 December 1995	170 cm (5 ft 7 in)	59 kg (130 lb)	281 cm (9 ft 3 in)	269 cm (8 ft 10 in)	Supreme VC
22	Sineenat Phocharoen	19 May 1995	173 cm (5 ft 8 in)	53 kg (117 lb)	287 cm (9 ft 5 in)	270 cm (8 ft 10 in)	Sisaket VC

== Turkey ==
The following is the Turkey roster in the 2013 FIVB World Grand Prix.

#	Name	Date of Birth	Height	Weight	Spike	Block	Club
1	Güldeniz Önal Pasaoglu	25 March 1986	182 cm (6 ft 0 in)	75 kg (165 lb)	296 cm (9 ft 9 in)	290 cm (9 ft 6 in)	VakifBank
2	Gülden Kayalar Kuzubasioglu	5 December 1980	167 cm (5 ft 6 in)	57 kg (126 lb)	281 cm (9 ft 3 in)	275 cm (9 ft 0 in)	ECZACIBASI
3	Gizem Karadayi	14 January 1987	178 cm (5 ft 10 in)	60 kg (130 lb)	290 cm (9 ft 6 in)	285 cm (9 ft 4 in)	Vakifbank
4	Birgül Guler	2 May 1990	178 cm (5 ft 10 in)	68 kg (150 lb)	305 cm (10 ft 0 in)	290 cm (9 ft 6 in)	BURSA BELEDIYE
5	Ergul Avci	24 July 1987	190 cm (6 ft 3 in)	75 kg (165 lb)	300 cm (9 ft 10 in)	285 cm (9 ft 4 in)	GALATASARAY
6	Polen Uslupehlivan	27 August 1990	193 cm (6 ft 4 in)	65 kg (143 lb)	305 cm (10 ft 0 in)	298 cm (9 ft 9 in)	Fenerbahce
7	Seda Tokatlioglu	25 June 1986	192 cm (6 ft 4 in)	80 kg (180 lb)	312 cm (10 ft 3 in)	304 cm (10 ft 0 in)	BAIC Motor Pekin
8	Bahar Toksoy	6 February 1988	190 cm (6 ft 3 in)	68 kg (150 lb)	315 cm (10 ft 4 in)	305 cm (10 ft 0 in)	VakifBank Istanbul
9	Özge Kirdar Çemberci	26 June 1985	183 cm (6 ft 0 in)	68 kg (150 lb)	310 cm (10 ft 2 in)	300 cm (9 ft 10 in)	ECZACIBASI
10	Gözde Sonsirma	26 June 1985	183 cm (6 ft 0 in)	70 kg (150 lb)	297 cm (9 ft 9 in)	292 cm (9 ft 7 in)	VAKIFBANK
11	Naz Aydemir	14 August 1990	186 cm (6 ft 1 in)	68 kg (150 lb)	304 cm (10 ft 0 in)	300 cm (9 ft 10 in)	VakifBank Istanbul
12	Esra Gumus Kirici	2 October 1982	181 cm (5 ft 11 in)	76 kg (168 lb)	305 cm (10 ft 0 in)	297 cm (9 ft 9 in)	ECZACIBASI
13	Neriman Ozsoy	13 July 1988	188 cm (6 ft 2 in)	76 kg (168 lb)	310 cm (10 ft 2 in)	291 cm (9 ft 7 in)	Imoco Volley Conegliano
14	Gözde Yilmaz	9 September 1991	195 cm (6 ft 5 in)	78 kg (172 lb)	306 cm (10 ft 0 in)	299 cm (9 ft 10 in)	Eczacibasi
15	Ezgi Arslan	23 March 1992	181 cm (5 ft 11 in)	59 kg (130 lb)	280 cm (9 ft 2 in)	275 cm (9 ft 0 in)	GALATASARAY
16	Büsra Cansu	16 July 1990	188 cm (6 ft 2 in)	84 kg (185 lb)	297 cm (9 ft 9 in)	291 cm (9 ft 7 in)	Eczacibasi
17	Neslihan Darnel	9 December 1983	187 cm (6 ft 2 in)	72 kg (159 lb)	315 cm (10 ft 4 in)	306 cm (10 ft 0 in)	ECZACIBASI
18	Asuman Karakoyun	16 July 1990	180 cm (5 ft 11 in)	72 kg (159 lb)	293 cm (9 ft 7 in)	289 cm (9 ft 6 in)	Eczacibasi
19	Ayse Melis Gürkaynak	20 April 1990	180 cm (5 ft 11 in)	68 kg (150 lb)	300 cm (9 ft 10 in)	280 cm (9 ft 2 in)	VakifBank Istanbul
20	Kubra Akman	13 October 1994	197 cm (6 ft 6 in)	89 kg (196 lb)	314 cm (10 ft 4 in)	305 cm (10 ft 0 in)	Vakifbank
21	Asli Kalac	13 December 1995	183 cm (6 ft 0 in)	73 kg (161 lb)	300 cm (9 ft 10 in)	290 cm (9 ft 6 in)	Galatasaray
22	Dilara Bagci	2 February 1994	165 cm (5 ft 5 in)	62 kg (137 lb)	270 cm (8 ft 10 in)	260 cm (8 ft 6 in)	Eczacibasi

== United States ==
- Head Coach: Karch Kiraly

The following is the United States roster in the 2013 FIVB World Grand Prix.

#	Name	Date of Birth	Height	Weight	Spike	Block	Club
1	Alisha Glass	5 April 1988	184 cm (6 ft 0 in)	72 kg (159 lb)	305 cm (10 ft 0 in)	300 cm (9 ft 10 in)	Imoco Volley
2	Danielle Scott-Arruda	1 October 1972	188 cm (6 ft 2 in)	84 kg (185 lb)	325 cm (10 ft 8 in)	302 cm (9 ft 11 in)	Praia Clube
3	Courtney Thompson	4 November 1984	170 cm (5 ft 7 in)	66 kg (146 lb)	276 cm (9 ft 1 in)	263 cm (8 ft 8 in)	Rio de Janeiro Volei Clube
4	Sonja Newcombe	7 March 1988	182 cm (6 ft 0 in)	70 kg (150 lb)	305 cm (10 ft 0 in)	300 cm (9 ft 10 in)	Tyumen Tyumen
5	Tamari Miyashiro	8 July 1987	170 cm (5 ft 7 in)	70 kg (150 lb)	284 cm (9 ft 4 in)	266 cm (8 ft 9 in)	Allianz Volley Stuttgart
6	Nicole Davis	24 April 1982	167 cm (5 ft 6 in)	73 kg (161 lb)	284 cm (9 ft 4 in)	266 cm (8 ft 9 in)	E.S. Cannet Rocheville VB
7	Cassidy Lichtman	25 May 1989	185 cm (6 ft 1 in)	68 kg (150 lb)	299 cm (9 ft 10 in)	279 cm (9 ft 2 in)	Sichuan Women's Volleyball
8	Lauren Gibbemeyer	8 September 1988	187 cm (6 ft 2 in)	71 kg (157 lb)	307 cm (10 ft 1 in)	293 cm (9 ft 7 in)	VBC Pallavolo Rosa
9	Alexandra Klineman	30 December 1989	194 cm (6 ft 4 in)	73 kg (161 lb)	322 cm (10 ft 7 in)	299 cm (9 ft 10 in)	Agil Volley SSD A RL
10	Kristin Lynn Hildebrand (C)	30 June 1985	185 cm (6 ft 1 in)	68 kg (150 lb)	300 cm (9 ft 10 in)	284 cm (9 ft 4 in)	Impel Volleyball S.A.
11	Alaina Bergsma	30 March 1990	190 cm (6 ft 3 in)	77 kg (170 lb)	315 cm (10 ft 4 in)	300 cm (9 ft 10 in)	Minas Tenis Clube
12	Kayla Banwarth	21 January 1989	178 cm (5 ft 10 in)	75 kg (165 lb)	295 cm (9 ft 8 in)	283 cm (9 ft 3 in)	USA Volleyball Team
13	Christa Harmotto Dietzen	12 October 1986	188 cm (6 ft 2 in)	79 kg (174 lb)	322 cm (10 ft 7 in)	300 cm (9 ft 10 in)	Fenerbahce SK
14	Nicole Fawcett	16 December 1986	191 cm (6 ft 3 in)	82 kg (181 lb)	310 cm (10 ft 2 in)	291 cm (9 ft 7 in)	Fujian Yango Women's VB Club
15	Kelly Murphy	20 October 1989	188 cm (6 ft 2 in)	79 kg (174 lb)	315 cm (10 ft 4 in)	307 cm (10 ft 1 in)	Ageo Medics
16	Kimberly Hill	30 November 1989	193 cm (6 ft 4 in)	72 kg (159 lb)	320 cm (10 ft 6 in)	310 cm (10 ft 2 in)	Vakifbank Istanbul
17	Lauren Paolini	22 August 1987	193 cm (6 ft 4 in)	73 kg (161 lb)	317 cm (10 ft 5 in)	299 cm (9 ft 10 in)	Hitachi Automotive Systems
18	Regan Hood Scott	10 August 1983	188 cm (6 ft 2 in)	79 kg (174 lb)	312 cm (10 ft 3 in)	305 cm (10 ft 0 in)	Iller Bankasi
19	Juliann Faucette	25 November 1989	188 cm (6 ft 2 in)	85 kg (187 lb)	320 cm (10 ft 6 in)	307 cm (10 ft 1 in)	Guangdong Evergrande Club
20	Jenna Hagglund	28 May 1989	178 cm (5 ft 10 in)	68 kg (150 lb)	292 cm (9 ft 7 in)	290 cm (9 ft 6 in)	Futura Volley
21	Cursty Jackson	11 September 1990	188 cm (6 ft 2 in)	71 kg (157 lb)	320 cm (10 ft 6 in)	310 cm (10 ft 2 in)	Galatasaray
22	Rachael Adams	3 June 1990	188 cm (6 ft 2 in)	81 kg (179 lb)	318 cm (10 ft 5 in)	307 cm (10 ft 1 in)	Imoco Volley
