= Liu Dan =

Liu Dan may refer to:

- Liu Dan (basketball) (born 1987), Chinese women's basketball player
- Liu Dan (volleyball) (born 1989), Chinese women's volleyball player

== See also ==
- Lau Dan, Hong Kong actor
- Dan Liu, Canadian fashion designer
