= Aleksandra Wójcik (volleyball) =

Polish volleyball player (born 1994)

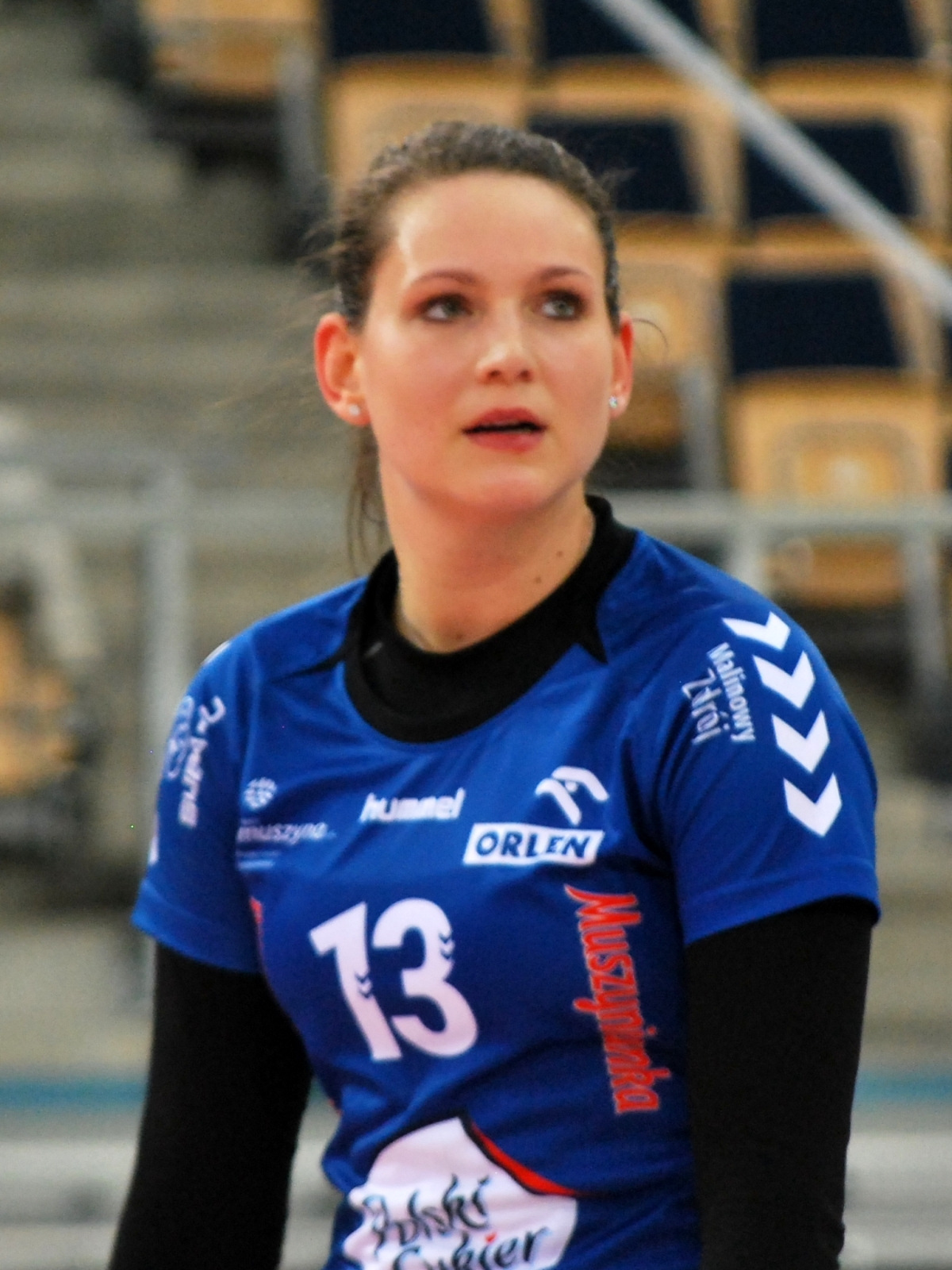
- Wójcik in 2016

Personal information
- Nationality: Polish
- Born: 3 January 1994 (age 32); Kamienna Góra, Poland
- Height: 184 cm (72 in)
- Weight: 76 kg (168 lb)
- Spike: 297 cm (117 in)
- Block: 279 cm (110 in)

Volleyball information
- Number: 18 (national team)

Career
Years	Teams
2014	Legionovia SA

National team
2013-	Poland

Aleksandra Wójcik (born 3 January 1994) is a Polish female volleyball player. She was part of the Poland women's national volleyball team.

She participated at the 2013 FIVB World Grand Prix, 2014 FIVB World Grand Prix and 2015 FIVB World Grand Prix. On club level she played for Legionovia SA in 2014.
