= Anet Alfonso =

Cuban volleyball player (born 1996)

Personal information
- Full name: Anet Barbara Alfonso Benitez
- Nationality: Cuban; Serbian
- Born: 26 June 1996 (age 30)
- Height: 1.72 m (5 ft 8 in)
- Weight: 54 kg (119 lb)
- Spike: 225 cm (89 in)
- Block: 222 cm (87 in)

Career
Years	Teams
2013	Camaguey

National team
2013	Cuba

Anet Barbara Alfonso Benitez (born 26 June 1996) is a Cuban and Serbian female volleyball player. She was part of the Cuba women's national volleyball team.

She participated in the 2013 FIVB Volleyball World Grand Prix.

On club level she played for Camaguey in 2013.
