= Alexandra Vinogradova =

Russian volleyball player (born 1988)

Personal information
- Nationality: Russian
- Born: 11 April 1988 (age 38)
- Height: 175 cm (69 in)
- Weight: 72 kg (159 lb)
- Spike: 295 cm (116 in)
- Block: 287 cm (113 in)

Volleyball information
- Position: libero
- Number: 18 (national team)

Career
Years	Teams
2013	Zarechie-Odinzovo

National team
2013	Russia

Alexandra Vinogradova (born 11 April 1988) is a Russian female volleyball player, playing as a l. She was part of the Russia women's national volleyball team.

She participated in the 2013 FIVB Volleyball World Grand Prix. On club level she played for Zarechie-Odinzovo in 2013.
