= Lilianny Marsillan =

Cuban volleyball player (born 1991)

Lilianny Marsillan Agüero

Personal information
- Nationality: Cuban
- Born: 5 October 1991 (age 35); Cienfuegos
- Height: 181 cm (5 ft 11 in)
- Weight: 65 kg (143 lb)
- Spike: 300 cm (118 in)
- Block: 295 cm (116 in)

Career
Years	Teams
2013	Cienfuegos

National team
2013	Cuba

Lilianny Marsillan Agüero (born 5 October 1991) is a Cuban female volleyball player. She was part of the Cuba women's national volleyball team.

== Career ==
She played the 2009 FIVB U20 World Championship with her junior national team. She left the Cuban team before the 2013 FIVB Volleyball World Grand Prix.
