= Flore Gravesteijn =

Dutch volleyball player (born 1987)

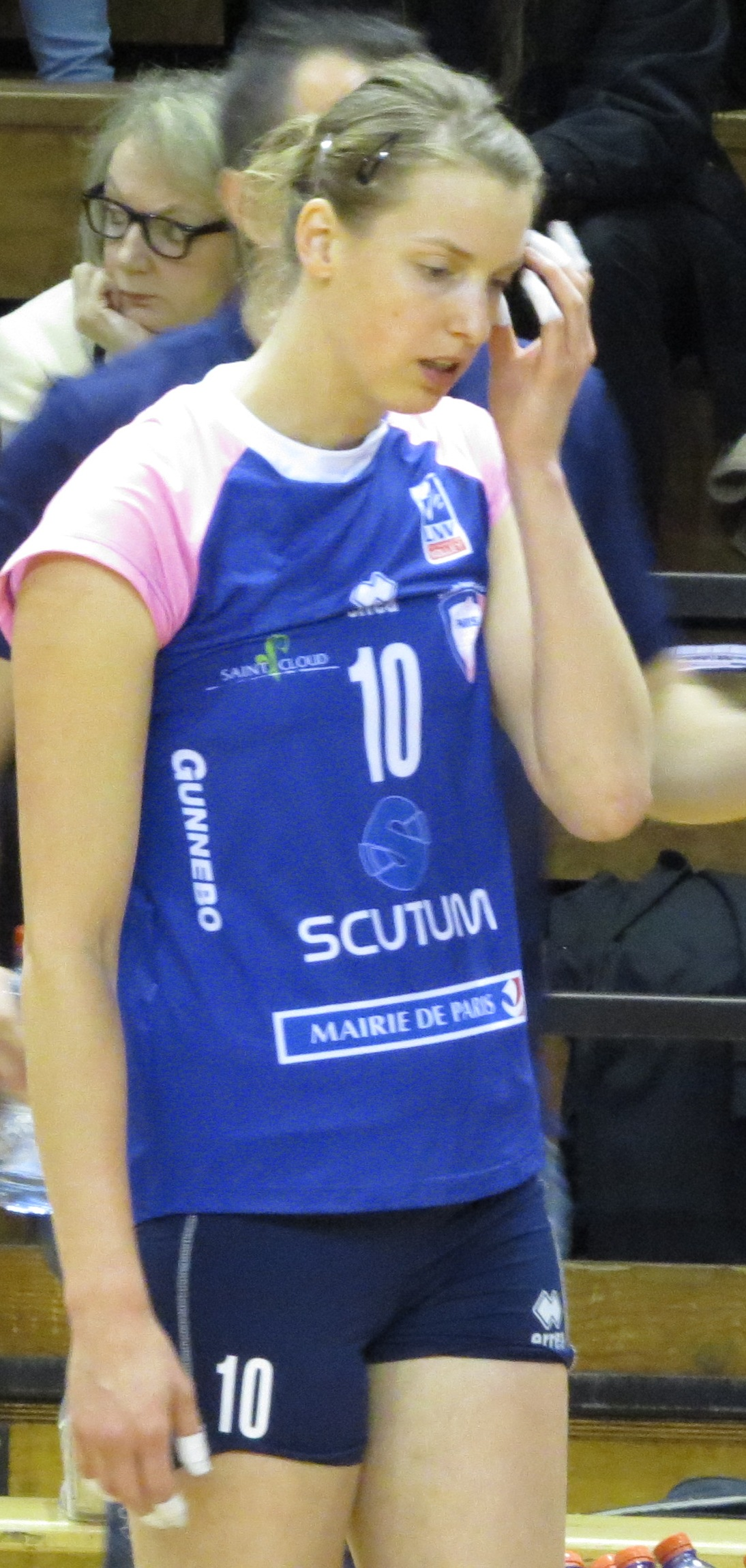

Personal information
- Nationality: Dutch
- Born: 26 April 1987 (age 39); Gouda
- Height: 189 cm (74 in)
- Weight: 68 kg (150 lb)
- Spike: 303 cm (119 in)
- Block: 291 cm (115 in)

Volleyball information
- Number: 13 (national team)

Career
Years	Teams
2014	Saint-Cloud Paris SF

National team
2013-2014	Netherlands

Flore Gravesteijn (born 26 April 1987) is a Dutch female volleyball player. She is part of the Netherlands women's national volleyball team.

She participated in the 2014 FIVB Volleyball World Grand Prix. On club level she played for Saint-Cloud Paris SF in 2014.
