= Anastassiya Rostovchshikova =

Kazakhstani volleyball player (born 1994)

Personal information
- Nationality: Kazakhstani
- Born: 17 April 1994 (age 32)
- Height: 180 cm (71 in)
- Weight: 64 kg (141 lb)
- Spike: 280 cm (110 in)
- Block: 260 cm (102 in)

Volleyball information
- Number: 15 (national team)

Career
Years	Teams
2014	KOSTANAY

National team
2014	Kazakhstan

Anastassiya Rostovchshikova (born 17 April 1994) is a Kazakhstani female volleyball player. She is part of the Kazakhstan women's national volleyball team.

She participated in the 2014 FIVB Volleyball World Grand Prix. On club level she played for Kostanay in 2014.
