= Letícia Hage =

Brazilian volleyball player (born 1990)

Leticia Hage

Personal information
- Full name: Leticia Magnani Hage
- Born: 9 September 1990 (age 36); Araraquara, São Paulo, Brazil
- Height: 187 cm (74 in)
- Weight: 83 kg (183 lb)
- Spike: 301 cm (119 in)
- Block: 288 cm (113 in)

Volleyball information
- Position: Middle blocker

National team
2013	Brazil

Leticia Magnani Hage (born 9 September 1990) is a Brazilian female volleyball player. She was part of the Brazil women's national volleyball team.

She participated in the 2013 FIVB Volleyball World Grand Prix. On club level she played for São Caetano E.C. in 2013.

== Clubs ==
- (Brazil) São Caetano (2007–2011)
- (Brazil) Mackenzie EC (2011–2012)
- (Brazil) Praia Clube (2011–2015)
- (Brazil) E.C. Pinheiros (2015–2016)
- (Brazil) Fluminense FC (2016–2020)
- (Romania) CS Rapid Bucuresti (2020–2021)
- (Poland) Pałac Bydgoszcz (2021–2022)
- (Brazil) Praia Clube (2022–)

== Awards ==
- 2022–23 Brazilian Superliga – Champion, with Dentil/Praia Clube
