= Esther van Berkel =

Dutch volleyball player (born 1990)

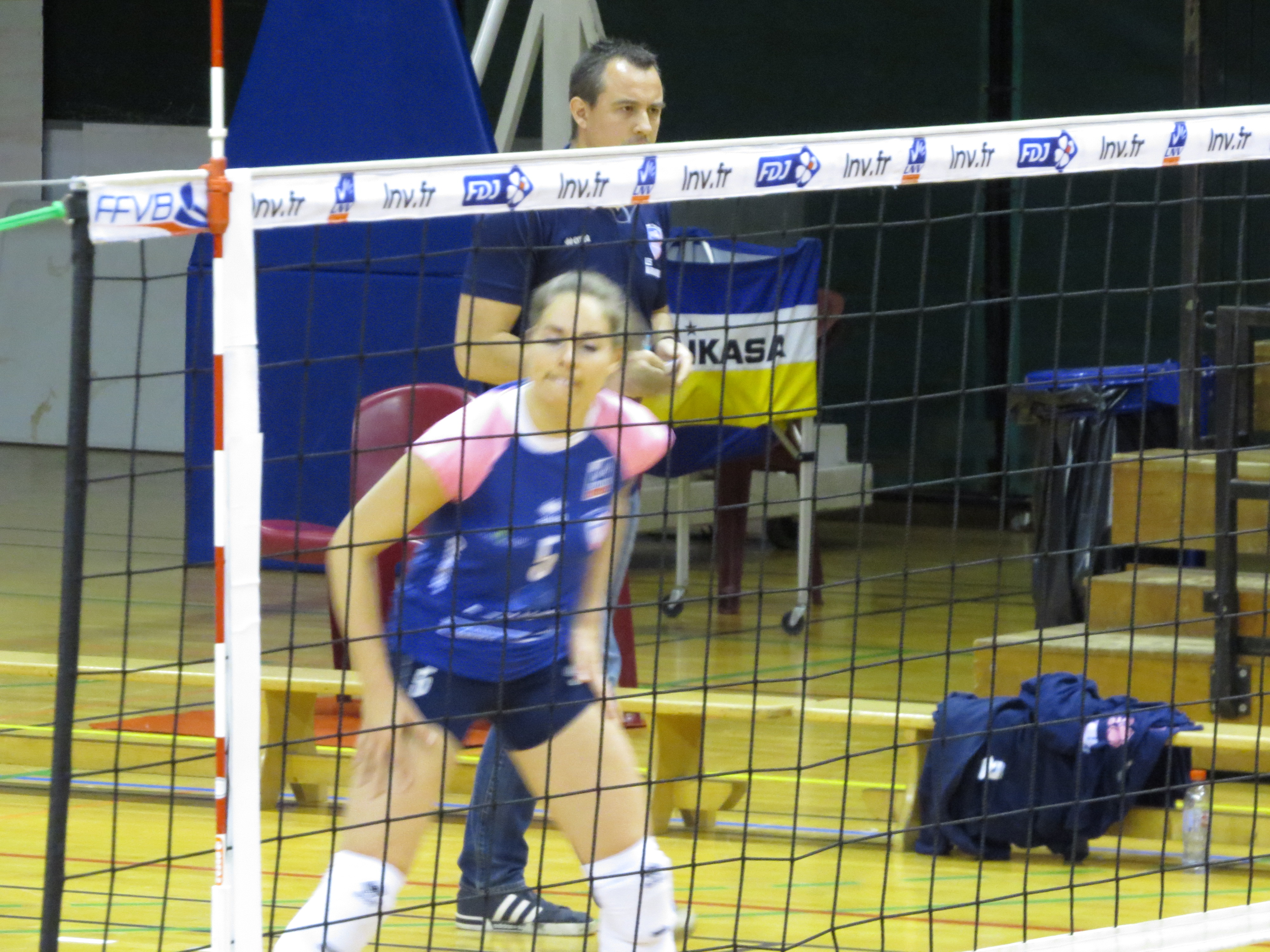

Personal information
- Nationality: Dutch
- Born: 31 August 1990 (age 36); Veghel, Netherlands
- Height: 176 cm (69 in)
- Weight: 68 kg (150 lb)
- Spike: 301 cm (119 in)
- Block: 287 cm (113 in)

Volleyball information
- Number: 21 (national team)

Career
Years	Teams
2014	Saint-Cloud Paris SF

National team
2014	Netherlands

Esther van Berkel (born 31 August 1990) is a Dutch volleyball player. She is part of the Netherlands women's national volleyball team.

She participated in the 2014 FIVB Volleyball World Grand Prix. On club level she played for Saint-Cloud Paris SF in 2014.
