= Quirine Oosterveld =

Dutch volleyball player (born 1990)

Personal information
- Nationality: Netherlands
- Born: 5 March 1990 (age 36); Almere
- Height: 1.81 m (5 ft 11 in)
- Weight: 71 kg (157 lb)
- Spike: 296 cm (117 in)
- Block: 288 cm (113 in)

Volleyball information
- Number: 20

Career
Years	Teams
2014	(Netherlands) Alterno Apeldoorn

Quirine Oosterveld (born 5 March 1990, Almere) is a Dutch female volleyball player. She is a member of the Netherlands women's national volleyball team and played for Alterno Apeldoorn in 2014.

She was part of the Dutch national team at the 2014 FIVB Volleyball Women's World Championship in Italy.

== Clubs ==
- (Netherlands) Alterno Apeldoorn (2014)
