= Patricia Montero =

Puerto Rican volleyball player

Personal information
- Nationality: Puerto Rican
- Born: 22 August 1997 (age 29); Ponce, Puerto Rico
- Height: 178 cm (5 ft 10 in)
- Weight: 58 kg (128 lb)
- Spike: 225 cm (89 in)
- Block: 224 cm (88 in)
- Education: University of Kansas

Volleyball information
- Position: Wing spiker
- Number: 16

National team
| Puerto Rico |
Honours
Women's volleyball
Representing Puerto Rico

Patricia Montero (born 22 August 1997) is a Puerto Rican female volleyball player.

She is part of the Puerto Rico women's national volleyball team. She participated in the 2013 FIVB World Grand Prix.

She played for the University of Kansas.
