= Petra Kojdová =

Czech volleyball player (born 1993)

Petra Kojdova

Personal information
- Nationality: Czech
- Born: 23 September 1993 (age 33)
- Height: 183 cm (72 in)
- Weight: 65 kg (143 lb)
- Spike: 304 cm (120 in)
- Block: 296 cm (117 in)

Volleyball information
- Number: 10 (national team)

Career
| Years | Teams |
|---|---|
| 2013 | SK UP Olomouc |

National team
| 2013 | Czech Republic |

Petra Kojdova (born 23 September 1993) is a Czech female volleyball player. She was part of the Czech Republic women's national volleyball team.

She participated in the 2013 FIVB Volleyball World Grand Prix. On club level she played for SK UP Olomouc in 2013.
