= Carina Aulenbrock =

German volleyball player (born 1994)

Personal information
- Nationality: German
- Born: 22 September 1994 (age 32)
- Height: 190 cm (75 in)
- Weight: 80 kg (176 lb)
- Spike: 310 cm (122 in)
- Block: 291 cm (115 in)

Volleyball information
- Number: 17 (national team)

Career
| Years | Teams |
|---|---|
| 2014 | Schweriner SC |

National team
| 2014 | Germany |

Carina Aulenbrock (born 22 September 1994) is a German female volleyball player. She is part of the Germany women's national volleyball team.

She participated in the 2014 FIVB Volleyball World Grand Prix. On club level she played for Schweriner SC in 2014.
