= Patrycja Polak =

Polish volleyball player (born 1991)

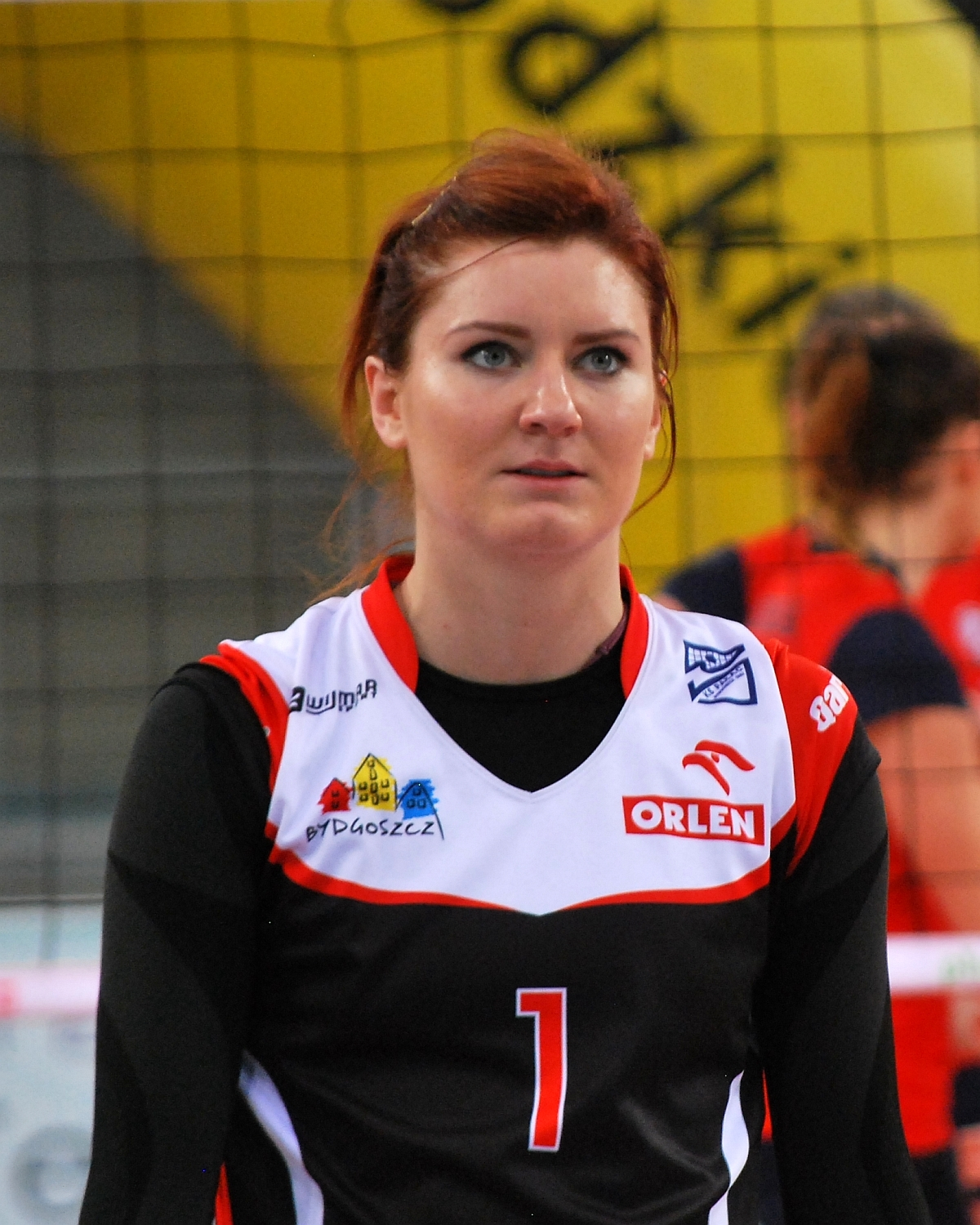

Personal information
- Nationality: Polish
- Born: 23 February 1991 (age 35)
- Height: 183 cm (72 in)
- Weight: 62 kg (137 lb)
- Spike: 301 cm (119 in)
- Block: 279 cm (110 in)

Volleyball information
- Number: 5 (national team)

Career
Years	Teams
2013	Impel Volleyball

National team
2013	Poland

Patrycja Polak (born 23 February 1991) is a Polish volleyball player. She was part of the Poland women's national volleyball team.

She participated in the 2013 FIVB Volleyball World Grand Prix. On club level she played for Impel Volleyball in 2013.
