= Beatríz Vílchez =

Cuban volleyball player (born 1995)

Personal information
- Full name: Beatríz Vilchez Santana
- Nationality: Cuban
- Born: 29 January 1995 (age 31)
- Height: 182 cm (6 ft 0 in)
- Weight: 68 kg (150 lb)
- Spike: 288 cm (113 in)
- Block: 277 cm (109 in)

Career
Years	Teams
2015	Cienfuegos

National team
2015	Cuba

Beatríz Vilchez Santana (born 29 January 1995) is a Cuban female volleyball player. She is part of the Cuba women's national volleyball team.

She participated in the 2015 FIVB Volleyball World Grand Prix. On club level she played for Cienfuegos in 2015.
