= Lisa Izquierdo =

German volleyball player (born 1994)

Personal information
- Nationality: German
- Born: 29 August 1994 (age 32); Staßfurt, Saxony-Anhalt, Germany
- Height: 178 cm (70 in)
- Weight: 78 kg (172 lb)

Volleyball information
- Position: right side hitter
- Number: 20 (national team)

Career
Years	Teams
2013	Dresdner SC

National team
2013	Germany
Medal record
Women's volleyball
Representing Germany
European Championship
Silver medal – second place	2013 Germany	Team

Lisa Izquierdo (born 29 August 1994) is a German female volleyball player, playing as a right side hitter. She is part of the Germany women's national volleyball team. She competed at the 2013 Women's European Volleyball Championship. On club level she played for Dresdner SC.
