= Slavina Koleva =

Bulgarian volleyball player

Personal information
- Full name: Славина Колева
- Nationality: Bulgarian
- Born: 22 November 1986 (age 39); Sofia, Bulgaria
- Height: 1.83 m (6 ft 0 in)
- Weight: 65 kg (143 lb)
- Spike: 306 cm (120 in)
- Block: 290 cm (110 in)

Volleyball information
- Position: Outside hitter
- Current club: CS Volei Alba-Blaj

Career
Years	Teams
2009–2010	Saint-Raphaël Var VB
2014–2015	Karşıyaka Izmir
2015–2017	Calcit Volleyball
2017	Sta. Lucia Lady Realtors
2017–	CS Volei Alba-Blaj

National team
Bulgaria

Slavina Koleva (Bulgarian: Славина Колева) (born 22 November 1986) is a Bulgarian female volleyball player. She is a member of the Bulgaria women's national volleyball team and was part of the Bulgarian national team at the 2014 FIVB Volleyball Women's World Championship in Italy. On club level, she plays for CS Volei Alba-Blaj since 2017.

== Clubs ==
- (France) Saint-Raphaël Var VB (2009–2010)
- (Turkey) Karşıyaka Izmir (2014–2015)
- (Slovenia) Calcit Volleyball (2015–2017)
- (Philippines) Sta. Lucia Lady Realtors (2017)
- (Romania) CS Volei Alba-Blaj (2017–2018)
- (Romania) Știința Bacău (2018–2019)
