= Anastasia Salina =

Russian volleyball player (born 1988)

Personal information
- Nationality: Russian
- Born: 30 December 1988 (age 37)
- Height: 181 cm (71 in)
- Weight: 67 kg (148 lb)
- Spike: 295 cm (116 in)
- Block: 288 cm (113 in)

Volleyball information
- Number: 2 (national team)

Career
- Years: Team
- 2013: Uralochka-UGMK

National team
- Years: Team
- 2013: Russia

Anastasia Salina (born 30 December 1988) is a Russian volleyball player. She was part of the Russia women's national volleyball team.

She participated in the 2013 FIVB Volleyball World Grand Prix. On club level she played for Uralochka-UGMK in 2013.
