= Birgül Güler =

Turkish volleyball player (born 1990)

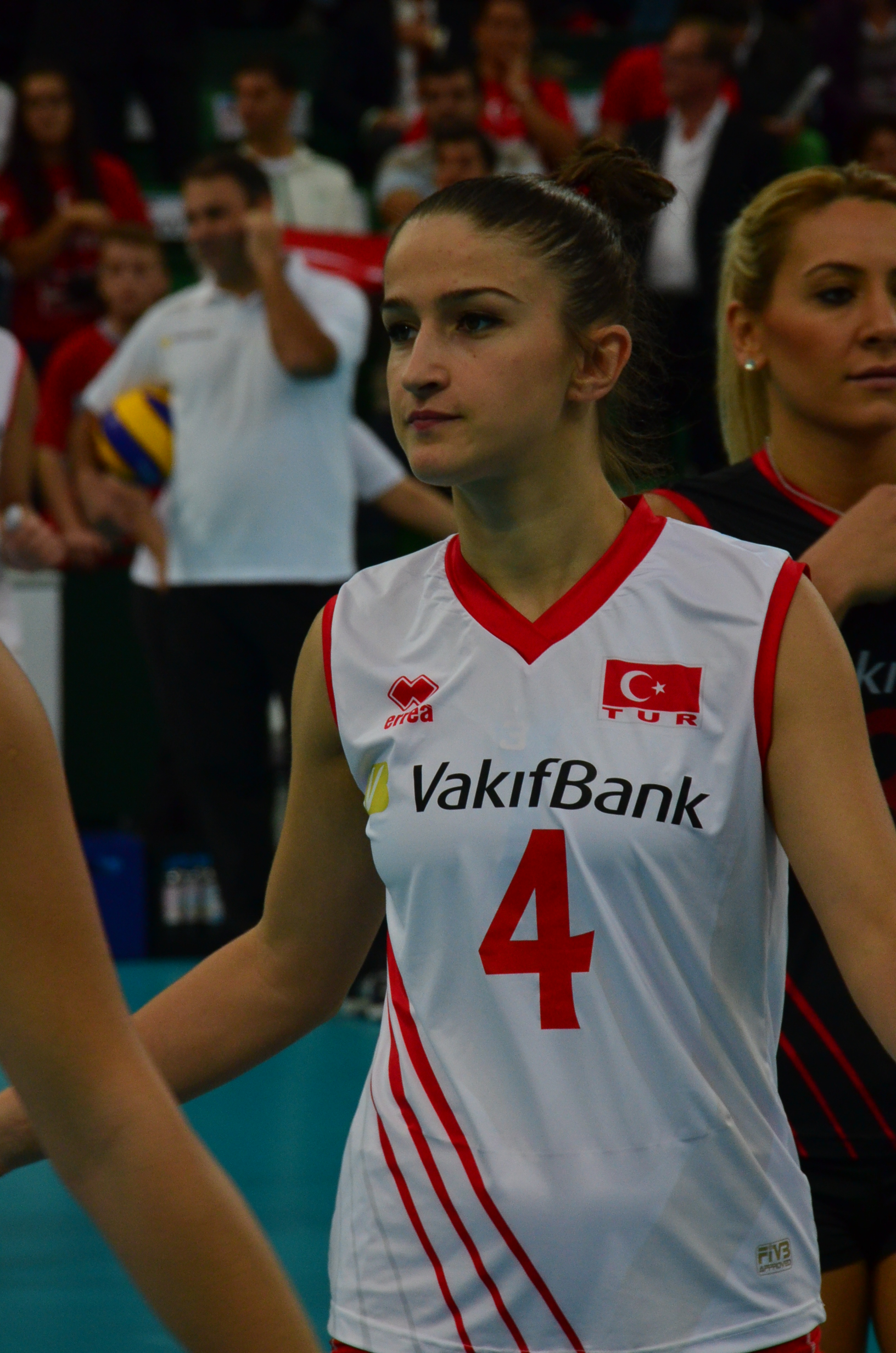
- Güler in 2013

Personal information
- Nationality: Turkish
- Born: 2 May 1990 (age 36)
- Height: 178 cm (70 in)
- Weight: 68 kg (150 lb)

Volleyball information
- Position: right side hitter
- Number: 4 (national team)

Career
Years	Teams
2013	Nilüfer Bursa

National team
2013	Turkey

Birgül Güler (born 2 May 1990) is a Turkish former female volleyball player who played as a right-side hitter. She was part of the Turkey women's national volleyball team.

She competed at the 2013 Women's European Volleyball Championship. On club level she played for Nilüfer Bursa.
