= Nadira Ait Oumghar =

Algerian volleyball player (born 1994)

Personal information
- Nationality: Algerian
- Born: 9 October 1994 (age 32); Béjaïa
- Height: 185 cm (73 in)
- Weight: 77 kg (170 lb)
- Spike: 281 cm (111 in)
- Block: 263 cm (104 in)

Volleyball information
- Number: 1 (national team)

Career
Years	Teams
2015	Seddouk Volleyball

National team
2015	Algeria

Nadira Ait Oumghar (born 9 October 1994) is an Algerian female volleyball player. She is part of the Algeria women's national volleyball team. On club level she played for Seddouk Volleyball in 2015.

== Club information ==
Current club : (Algeria) Seddouk club Bejaia
