= Valeriya Goncharova =

Russian volleyball player

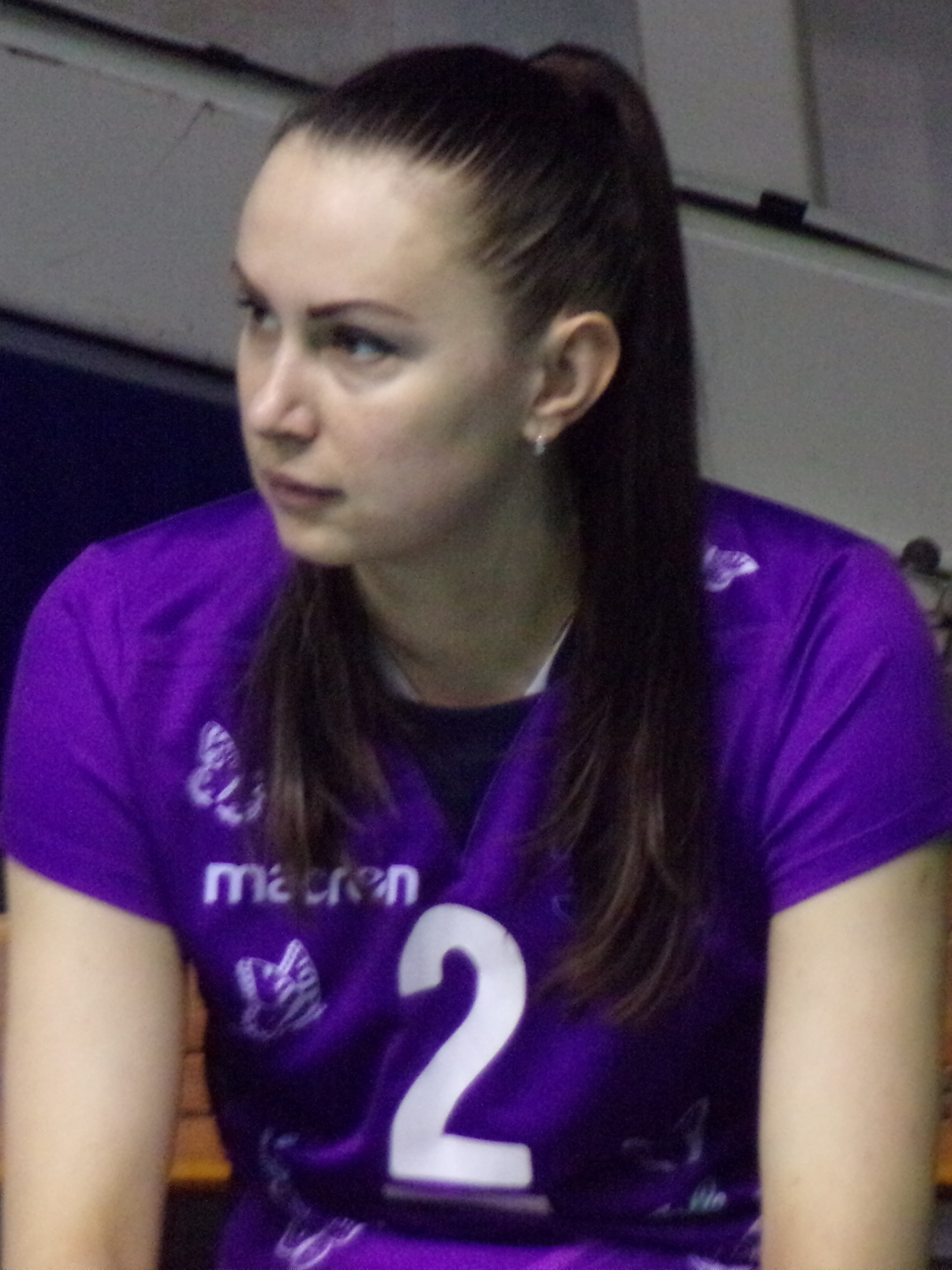

Personal information
- Nationality: Russian
- Born: 3 January 1988 (age 38)
- Height: 1.88 m (6 ft 2 in)
- Weight: 70 kg (150 lb)
- Spike: 308 cm (121 in)
- Block: 301 cm (119 in)

Volleyball information
- Position: Middle-blocker
- Current club: (Russia) WVC Dinamo-Moscow
- Number: 21

Valeriya Olegovna Goncharova (Russian: Валерия Олеговна Гончарова, Ukrainian: Валерія Олегівна Гончарова; born 3 January 1988) is a Russian volleyball player.

She played for the Women's National Team at the 2013 FIVB World Grand Prix.

She played for WVC Dynamo Moscow.

== Clubs ==
Years	Club
2004 – 2006	Regina (Rivno)
2006 – 2009	Dinamo – RGSU
2009 – 2011	Dinamo Moscow
2011	Omsk Region
2011/2012	Tyumen State University
2014; 2015/2016	Zarechie Odintsovo
