= Desislava Nikolova =

Bulgarian volleyball player (born 1985)

Personal information
- Nationality: Bulgaria
- Born: 21 December 1991 (age 34)
- Height: 1.84 m (6 ft 0 in)
- Weight: 70 kg (154 lb)
- Spike: 290 cm (114 in)
- Block: 285 cm (112 in)

Career
Teams
| | Bulgaria VK Maritsa Plovdiv |

Desislava Nikolova (born 21 December 1991) is a Bulgarian female volleyball player. She is a member of the Bulgaria women's national volleyball team and played for VK Maritsa Plovdiv in 2017.

She was part of the Bulgarian national team at the 2015 FIVB World Grand Prix.

== Clubs ==
| Club | From | To |
|---|---|---|
| Bulgaria Slavia Sofia | 2003-2004 | 2004-2005 |
| Bulgaria Septemvri Volley | 2005-2006 | 2005-2006 |
| Bulgaria Slavia Sofia | 2006-2007 | 2008-2009 |
| Austria ASKÖ Linz-Steg | 2009-2010 | 2011-2012 |
| Italy Volley Soverato | 2012-2013 | 2012-2013 |
| Turkey Halkbank Ankara | 2013-2014 | 2013-2014 |
| Turkey Seramiksan SK | 2015-2016 | 2016-2017 |
| Bulgaria VK Maritsa Plovdiv | 2017-2018 | … |
