= Liu Dan (volleyball) =

Chinese volleyball player (born 1989)

Personal information
- Nationality: Chinese
- Born: 29 August 1989 (age 37)
- Height: 180 cm (71 in)
- Weight: 65 kg (143 lb)
- Spike: 305 cm (120 in)
- Block: 295 cm (116 in)

Career
Years	Teams
2013	Guangdong Evergrande

National team
2013	China

Liu Dan (born 29 August 1989) is a Chinese female volleyball player. She was part of the China women's national volleyball team.

She participated in the 2013 FIVB Volleyball World Grand Prix. On club level she played for Guangdong Evergrande in 2013.
