= 2015 FIVB Volleyball Women's Club World Championship squads =

This article shows the rosters of all participating teams at the 2015 FIVB Volleyball Women's Club World Championship in Zürich, Switzerland.

== Pool A ==
=== Rexona Ades ===
The following is the roster of the Brazilian club Rexona Ades Rio de Janeiro in the 2015 FIVB Volleyball Women's Club World Championship.

Head coach: (Brazil) Bernardo Rezende

No.	Name	Date of birth	Height	Weight	Spike	Block
1	(Brazil) Gabriela Guimarães	19 May 1994	1.76 m (5 ft 9 in)	59 kg (130 lb)	295 cm (116 in)	274 cm (108 in)
2	(Brazil) Mayhara Silva	9 April 1989	1.84 m (6 ft 0 in)	73 kg (161 lb)	320 cm (130 in)	270 cm (110 in)
3	(Brazil) Bruna Silva	3 July 1989	1.81 m (5 ft 11 in)	80 kg (180 lb)	300 cm (120 in)	260 cm (100 in)
4	(Brazil) Giovana Gasparini	5 July 1994	1.72 m (5 ft 8 in)	74 kg (163 lb)	281 cm (111 in)	264 cm (104 in)
5	(Brazil) Regiane Bidias	2 October 1986	1.89 m (6 ft 2 in)	74 kg (163 lb)	304 cm (120 in)	286 cm (113 in)
6	(Brazil) Juciely Barreto	18 December 1980	1.84 m (6 ft 0 in)	71 kg (157 lb)	312 cm (123 in)	289 cm (114 in)
7	(Brazil) Hélia Souza (C)	10 March 1970	1.73 m (5 ft 8 in)	65 kg (143 lb)	283 cm (111 in)	264 cm (104 in)
8	(Brazil) Amanda Francisco	16 August 1988	1.80 m (5 ft 11 in)	62 kg (137 lb)	304 cm (120 in)	286 cm (113 in)
9	(Brazil) Roberta Ratzke	28 April 1990	1.85 m (6 ft 1 in)	71 kg (157 lb)	287 cm (113 in)	278 cm (109 in)
10	(Brazil) Andreia Laurence	26 April 1983	1.83 m (6 ft 0 in)	76 kg (168 lb)	298 cm (117 in)	288 cm (113 in)
12	(Brazil) Natália Pereira	4 April 1989	1.83 m (6 ft 0 in)	76 kg (168 lb)	300 cm (120 in)	288 cm (113 in)
14	(Brazil) Fabiana Oliveira	7 March 1980	1.69 m (5 ft 7 in)	59 kg (130 lb)	276 cm (109 in)	266 cm (105 in)
15	(Brazil) Ana Carolina da Silva	8 April 1991	1.83 m (6 ft 0 in)	73 kg (161 lb)	290 cm (110 in)	290 cm (110 in)
17	(Brazil) Drussyla Costa	1 July 1996	1.86 m (6 ft 1 in)	70 kg (150 lb)	310 cm (120 in)	270 cm (110 in)

=== Voléro Zürich ===
The following is the roster of the Swiss club Voléro Zürich in the 2015 FIVB Volleyball Women's Club World Championship.

Head coach: (Netherlands) Avital Selinger

No.	Name	Date of birth	Height	Weight	Spike	Block
1	(Ukraine) Yevgeniya Nyukhalova	23 May 1995	1.93 m (6 ft 4 in)	79 kg (174 lb)	310 cm (120 in)	296 cm (117 in)
2	(Switzerland) Laura Unternährer	11 July 1993	1.79 m (5 ft 10 in)	70 kg (150 lb)	303 cm (119 in)	283 cm (111 in)
3	(Serbia) Nađa Ninković	1 November 1991	1.92 m (6 ft 4 in)	77 kg (170 lb)	307 cm (121 in)	298 cm (117 in)
5	(Bulgaria) Dobriana Rabadzhieva	14 June 1991	1.94 m (6 ft 4 in)	72 kg (159 lb)	305 cm (120 in)	285 cm (112 in)
7	(Ukraine) Olesia Rykhliuk	11 December 1987	1.96 m (6 ft 5 in)	83 kg (183 lb)	316 cm (124 in)	304 cm (120 in)
8	(Serbia) Silvija Popović	15 March 1986	1.78 m (5 ft 10 in)	65 kg (143 lb)	276 cm (109 in)	266 cm (105 in)
9	(Azerbaijan) Natalya Mammadova	2 December 1984	1.96 m (6 ft 5 in)	78 kg (172 lb)	319 cm (126 in)	302 cm (119 in)
11	(United States) Natalie Hagglund	1 July 1992	1.78 m (5 ft 10 in)	68 kg (150 lb)	292 cm (115 in)	290 cm (110 in)
14	(Cuba) Rachel Sánchez	9 January 1989	1.88 m (6 ft 2 in)	86 kg (190 lb)	316 cm (124 in)	297 cm (117 in)
15	(United States) Courtney Thompson (C)	4 November 1984	1.70 m (5 ft 7 in)	66 kg (146 lb)	276 cm (109 in)	263 cm (104 in)
16	(Switzerland) Inès Granvorka	13 August 1991	1.79 m (5 ft 10 in)	70 kg (150 lb)	303 cm (119 in)	283 cm (111 in)
17	(United States) Emily Hartong	4 February 1992	1.87 m (6 ft 2 in)	75 kg (165 lb)	309 cm (122 in)	295 cm (116 in)
18	(Russia) Anna Kupriianova	20 November 1987	1.90 m (6 ft 3 in)	72 kg (159 lb)	307 cm (121 in)	291 cm (115 in)
19	(Croatia) Ana Grbac	23 March 1988	1.86 m (6 ft 1 in)	64 kg (141 lb)	302 cm (119 in)	288 cm (113 in)

=== Mirador ===
The following is the roster of the Dominican Republic club Mirador Santo Domingo in the 2015 FIVB Volleyball Women's Club World Championship.

Head coach: (Brazil) Marcos Kwiek

No.	Name	Date of birth	Height	Weight	Spike	Block
1	(Dominican Republic) Jineiry Martínez	3 December 1997	1.90 m (6 ft 3 in)	68 kg (150 lb)	305 cm (120 in)	280 cm (110 in)
2	(Dominican Republic) Winifer Fernández	6 January 1995	1.69 m (5 ft 7 in)	62 kg (137 lb)	270 cm (110 in)	265 cm (104 in)
3	(Dominican Republic) Lisvel Eve	10 September 1991	1.94 m (6 ft 4 in)	70 kg (150 lb)	325 cm (128 in)	315 cm (124 in)
4	(Dominican Republic) Marianne Fersola	16 January 1992	1.91 m (6 ft 3 in)	60 kg (130 lb)	315 cm (124 in)	310 cm (120 in)
5	(Dominican Republic) Gaila González	25 June 1997	1.88 m (6 ft 2 in)	73 kg (161 lb)	304 cm (120 in)	276 cm (109 in)
6	(Dominican Republic) Camil Domínguez	7 December 1991	1.76 m (5 ft 9 in)	75 kg (165 lb)	232 cm (91 in)	275 cm (108 in)
7	(Dominican Republic) Niverka Marte (C)	19 October 1990	1.78 m (5 ft 10 in)	71 kg (157 lb)	295 cm (116 in)	283 cm (111 in)
8	(Dominican Republic) Candida Arias	11 March 1992	1.94 m (6 ft 4 in)	68 kg (150 lb)	320 cm (130 in)	315 cm (124 in)
9	(Dominican Republic) Natalia Martínez	25 November 2000	1.86 m (6 ft 1 in)	71 kg (157 lb)	300 cm (120 in)	275 cm (108 in)
11	(Dominican Republic) María Yvett García	4 July 1996	1.84 m (6 ft 0 in)	71 kg (157 lb)	296 cm (117 in)	265 cm (104 in)
13	(Dominican Republic) Erasma Moreno	25 November 1991	1.83 m (6 ft 0 in)	75 kg (165 lb)	289 cm (114 in)	304 cm (120 in)
17	(Dominican Republic) Gina Mambru	21 January 1986	1.82 m (6 ft 0 in)	65 kg (143 lb)	330 cm (130 in)	315 cm (124 in)
19	(Dominican Republic) Ana Binet	9 February 1992	1.74 m (5 ft 9 in)	58 kg (128 lb)	280 cm (110 in)	260 cm (100 in)
20	(Dominican Republic) Brayelin Martínez	11 September 1996	1.97 m (6 ft 6 in)	76 kg (168 lb)	330 cm (130 in)	320 cm (130 in)

== Pool B ==
=== Eczacıbaşı VitrA ===
The following is the roster of the Turkish club Eczacıbaşı VitrA Istanbul in the 2015 FIVB Volleyball Women's Club World Championship.

Head coach: (Italy) Giovanni Caprara

No.	Name	Date of birth	Height	Weight	Spike	Block
1	(Dominican Republic) Bethania de la Cruz	13 May 1987	1.88 m (6 ft 2 in)	70 kg (150 lb)	330 cm (130 in)	320 cm (130 in)
2	(Turkey) Gülden Kayalar	5 December 1980	1.67 m (5 ft 6 in)	57 kg (126 lb)	281 cm (111 in)	275 cm (108 in)
5	(Turkey) Şeyma Ercan	5 July 1994	1.87 m (6 ft 2 in)	75 kg (165 lb)	302 cm (119 in)	295 cm (116 in)
6	(Turkey) Ceylan Arısan	1 January 1994	1.93 m (6 ft 4 in)	79 kg (174 lb)	306 cm (120 in)	297 cm (117 in)
7	(Turkey) Dilara Bağcı	2 February 1994	1.65 m (5 ft 5 in)	62 kg (137 lb)	280 cm (110 in)	274 cm (108 in)
8	(Turkey) Asuman Karakoyun	16 July 1990	1.80 m (5 ft 11 in)	72 kg (159 lb)	293 cm (115 in)	289 cm (114 in)
9	(Turkey) Büşra Cansu	16 July 1990	1.88 m (6 ft 2 in)	84 kg (185 lb)	297 cm (117 in)	291 cm (115 in)
10	(United States) Jordan Larson	16 October 1986	1.88 m (6 ft 2 in)	75 kg (165 lb)	302 cm (119 in)	295 cm (116 in)
11	(Turkey) Nilay Özdemir	24 October 1985	1.79 m (5 ft 10 in)	67 kg (148 lb)	286 cm (113 in)	280 cm (110 in)
12	(Turkey) Esra Gümüş (C)	2 October 1982	1.81 m (5 ft 11 in)	76 kg (168 lb)	305 cm (120 in)	297 cm (117 in)
13	(Germany) Christiane Fürst	29 March 1985	1.92 m (6 ft 4 in)	76 kg (168 lb)	323 cm (127 in)	307 cm (121 in)
14	(Turkey) Gözde Yılmaz	9 September 1991	1.95 m (6 ft 5 in)	82 kg (181 lb)	306 cm (120 in)	299 cm (118 in)
17	(Turkey) Neslihan Demir	9 December 1983	1.87 m (6 ft 2 in)	72 kg (159 lb)	307 cm (121 in)	300 cm (120 in)
18	(Croatia) Maja Poljak	2 May 1983	1.94 m (6 ft 4 in)	80 kg (180 lb)	305 cm (120 in)	300 cm (120 in)

=== Hisamitsu Springs ===
The following is the roster of the Japanese club Hisamitsu Springs Kobe in the 2015 FIVB Volleyball Women's Club World Championship.

Head coach: (Japan) Kumi Nakada

No.	Name	Date of birth	Height	Weight	Spike	Block
1	(Japan) Miyu Nagaoka	25 July 1991	1.79 m (5 ft 10 in)	68 kg (150 lb)	310 cm (120 in)	398 cm (157 in)
2	(Japan) Chizuru Kotō	8 October 1982	1.71 m (5 ft 7 in)	64 kg (141 lb)	295 cm (116 in)	282 cm (111 in)
3	(Japan) Risa Shinnabe (C)	11 July 1990	1.73 m (5 ft 8 in)	66 kg (146 lb)	295 cm (116 in)	268 cm (106 in)
4	(Japan) Nana Iwasaka	3 July 1990	1.87 m (6 ft 2 in)	72 kg (159 lb)	300 cm (120 in)	285 cm (112 in)
5	(Japan) Yumi Mizuta	30 November 1986	1.81 m (5 ft 11 in)	67 kg (148 lb)	299 cm (118 in)	290 cm (110 in)
6	(Japan) Yuki Ishii	8 May 1991	1.80 m (5 ft 11 in)	68 kg (150 lb)	302 cm (119 in)	286 cm (113 in)
8	(Japan) Rika Nomoto	21 September 1991	1.79 m (5 ft 10 in)	70 kg (150 lb)	310 cm (120 in)	279 cm (110 in)
9	(Serbia) Brankica Mihajlović	13 April 1991	1.89 m (6 ft 2 in)	64 kg (141 lb)	282 cm (111 in)	264 cm (104 in)
10	(Japan) Kotoki Zayasu	11 January 1990	1.59 m (5 ft 3 in)	57 kg (126 lb)	270 cm (110 in)	255 cm (100 in)
12	(Japan) Sayaka Tsutsui	29 September 1992	1.58 m (5 ft 2 in)	51 kg (112 lb)	255 cm (100 in)	245 cm (96 in)
13	(Japan) Shiori Murata	23 June 1992	1.67 m (5 ft 6 in)	56 kg (123 lb)	285 cm (112 in)	270 cm (110 in)
15	(Japan) Ayano Nakaoji	24 July 1991	1.67 m (5 ft 6 in)	64 kg (141 lb)	289 cm (114 in)	279 cm (110 in)
16	(Japan) Risa Ishibashi	3 February 1990	1.78 m (5 ft 10 in)	62 kg (137 lb)	292 cm (115 in)	279 cm (110 in)
18	(Japan) Mana Toe	18 May 1994	1.63 m (5 ft 4 in)	60 kg (130 lb)	292 cm (115 in)	278 cm (109 in)

=== Dinamo Krasnodar ===
The following is the roster of the Russian club Dinamo Krasnodar in the 2015 FIVB Volleyball Women's Club World Championship.

Head coach: (Russia) Konstantin Ushakov

No.	Name	Date of birth	Height	Weight	Spike	Block
1	(Russia) Natalia Khodunova	1 July 1992	1.85 m (6 ft 1 in)	65 kg (143 lb)	305 cm (120 in)	295 cm (116 in)
3	(Brazil) Fabíola de Souza	3 February 1983	1.84 m (6 ft 0 in)	70 kg (150 lb)	300 cm (120 in)	285 cm (112 in)
4	(Ukraine) Marina Maryukhnich	26 November 1982	1.97 m (6 ft 6 in)	78 kg (172 lb)	308 cm (121 in)	287 cm (113 in)
5	(Russia) Lioubov Sokolova (C)	4 December 1977	1.92 m (6 ft 4 in)	72 kg (159 lb)	315 cm (124 in)	307 cm (121 in)
7	(Russia) Svetlana Kryuchkova	21 February 1985	1.74 m (5 ft 9 in)	63 kg (139 lb)	290 cm (110 in)	286 cm (113 in)
8	(Russia) Mariia Bibina	26 March 1994	1.76 m (5 ft 9 in)	60 kg (130 lb)	281 cm (111 in)	260 cm (100 in)
10	(Russia) Ekaterina Krivets	14 November 1984	1.93 m (6 ft 4 in)	74 kg (163 lb)	309 cm (122 in)	300 cm (120 in)
11	(Russia) Tatiana Kosheleva	23 December 1988	1.91 m (6 ft 3 in)	67 kg (148 lb)	315 cm (124 in)	305 cm (120 in)
12	(Cuba) Rosir Calderón	28 December 1984	1.91 m (6 ft 3 in)	76 kg (168 lb)	330 cm (130 in)	325 cm (128 in)
14	(Russia) Irina Filishtinskaia	14 June 1990	1.70 m (5 ft 7 in)	65 kg (143 lb)	285 cm (112 in)	275 cm (108 in)
15	(Russia) Aleksandra Pasynkova	14 April 1987	1.90 m (6 ft 3 in)	75 kg (165 lb)	313 cm (123 in)	305 cm (120 in)
16	(Brazil) Fernanda Garay	10 May 1986	1.79 m (5 ft 10 in)	74 kg (163 lb)	308 cm (121 in)	288 cm (113 in)
17	(Russia) Natalia Dianskaya	7 March 1989	1.86 m (6 ft 1 in)	64 kg (141 lb)	310 cm (120 in)	295 cm (116 in)
18	(Russia) Yuliya Podskalnaya	18 April 1989	1.90 m (6 ft 3 in)	75 kg (165 lb)	306 cm (120 in)	295 cm (116 in)

== See also ==
- 2015 FIVB Volleyball Men's Club World Championship squads
