= Roberta Ratzke =

Brazilian volleyball player (born 1990)

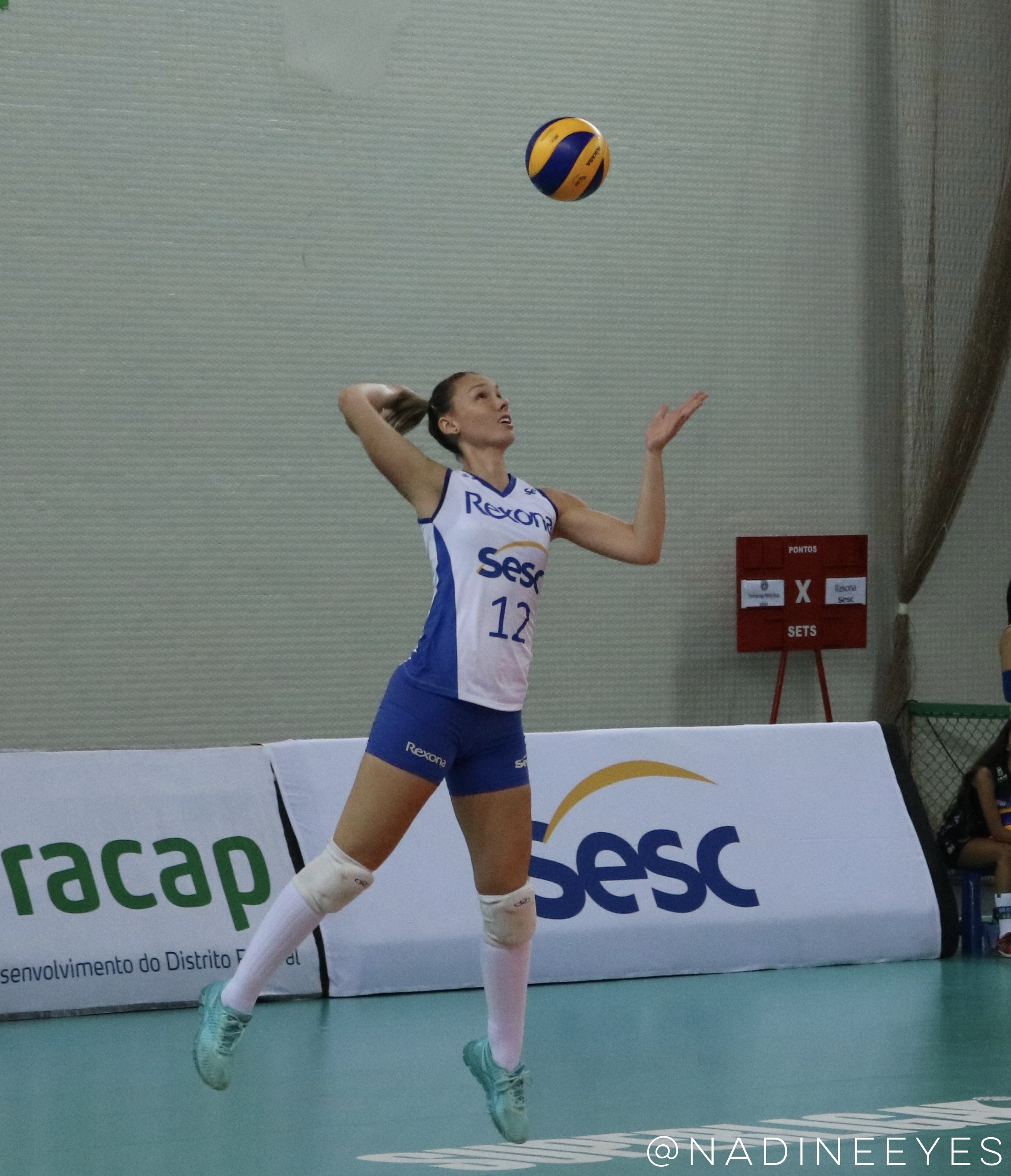
- Ratzke in 2017

Personal information
- Full name: Roberta Silva Ratzke
- Born: 28 April 1990 (age 36) Curitiba, Paraná, Brazil
- Height: 1.85 m (6 ft 1 in)
- Weight: 71 kg (157 lb)
- Spike: 287 cm (113 in)
- Block: 278 cm (109 in)

Volleyball information
- Position: Setter
- Current club: Türk Hava Yolları
- Number: 21

Career
- Years: Team
- 2007–2008 2008–2010 2010–2019 2019–2021 2021–2024 2024–: Mackenzie; E.C. Pinheiros; Sesc-RJ; Osasco/Audax; ŁKS Łódz; Türk Hava Yolları

National team
- Years: Team
- 2015–: Brazil
Honours
Women's volleyball
Representing Brazil
Olympic Games
Silver medal – second place	2020 Tokyo	Team
Bronze medal – third place	2024 Paris	Team
FIVB World Championship
Silver medal – second place	2022 Poland/Netherlands	Team
Bronze medal – third place	2025 Thailand	Team
World Grand Champions Cup
Silver medal – second place	2017 Japan	Team
Nations League
Silver medal – second place	2019 Nanjing	Team
Silver medal – second place	2021 Rimini	Team
Silver medal – second place	2022 Ankara	Team
Silver medal – second place	2025 Łódź
Silver medal – second place	2026 Macau
World Grand Prix
Gold medal – first place	2016 Bangkok	Team
Gold medal – first place	2017 Nanjing	Team
Bronze medal – third place	2015 Omaha	Team
Montreux Volley Masters
Gold medal – first place	2017 Switzerland	Team
South American Championship
Gold medal – first place	2015 Cartagena
Gold medal – first place	2017 Cali
Gold medal – first place	2019 Cajamarca
Gold medal – first place	2021 Barrancabermeja
Gold medal – first place	2023 Recife
Gold medal – first place	2026 Rio de Janeiro

Roberta Silva Ratzke (Brazilian Portuguese: [ʁoˈbɛɾtɐ ˈsiwvɐ ˈʁatski]; born 28 April 1990) is a Brazilian volleyball player for the Brazilian national team. She competed for Brazil at the 2020 Summer Olympics, winning a silver medal, and the 2024 Summer Olympics, winning a bronze medal.

== Career ==
With her club Rio de Janeiro, Ratzke competed at the FIVB Volleyball Women's Club World Championship in 2013, 2015 and 2016. She competed at the 2018 Women's Volleyball Nations League, and 2019 Women's Volleyball Nations League.

== Awards ==
=== Individuals ===
- 2008 U20 South American Championship – "Best Setter"
- 2017 South American Club Championship – "Best Setter"
- 2017 Montreux Volley Masters – "Best Setter"
- 2017–18 Brazilian Superliga – "Best Setter"
- 2023 South American Volleyball Championship – "Best Setter"

=== Clubs ===
- 2010–11 Brazilian Superliga – Champion, with Rexona-Ades
- 2012–13 Brazilian Superliga – Champion, with Unilever Vôlei
- 2013–14 Brazilian Superliga – Champion, with Rexona-Ades
- 2014–15 Brazilian Superliga – Champion, with Rexona-Ades
- 2015–16 Brazilian Superliga – Champion, with Rexona-Ades
- 2016–17 Brazilian Superliga – Champion, with Rexona-SESC
- 2013 South American Club Championship – Champion, with Unilever Vôlei
- 2015 South American Club Championship – Champion, with Rexona-Ades
- 2016 South American Club Championship – Champion, with Rexona-Ades
- 2017 South American Club Championship – Champion, with Rexona-SESC
- 2018 South American Club Championship – Runner-up, with SESC Rio
- 2013 FIVB Club World Championship – Runner-up, with Rexona-Ades
- 2017 FIVB Club World Championship – Runner-up, with Rexona-SESC
