= Gabriella Souza =

Brazilian volleyball player

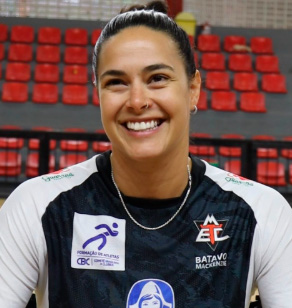

Personal information
- Full name: Gabriella Guimarães de Souza
- Nickname: Gabi or Gabiru
- Born: 14 December 1993 (age 32); Niterói, Brazil
- Height: 1.75 m (5 ft 9 in)
- Weight: 69 kg (152 lb)
- Spike: 296 cm (117 in)
- Block: 273 cm (107 in)

Volleyball information
- Position: Libero
- Current club: SESC-RJ
- Number: 14

National team
2017	Brazil
Honours
Women's volleyball
Representing Brazil
World Grand Champions Cup
Silver medal – second place	2017 Japan	Team
World Grand Prix
Gold medal – first place	2017 Nanjing	Team
Montreux Volley Masters
Gold medal – first place	2017 Switzerland	Team
South American Championship
Gold medal – first place	2017 Cali

Gabriella Guimarães de Souza, nicknames Gabi or Gabiru, (born 14 December 1993) is a Brazilian female volleyball player. With her former club Osasco/Molico she competed at the 2014 FIVB Volleyball Women's Club World Championship. She competed with the Brazil women's national volleyball team, at the 2016 Montreux Volley Masters, 2017 FIVB Volleyball World Grand Prix, and 2018 FIVB Volleyball Women's Nations League. Her club in 2019 is Sesc RJ.

== Clubs ==
- (Brazil) Niterói Vôlei (2004–2007)
- (Brazil) Fluminense FC (2007–2009)
- (Brazil) Macaé Sports (2009–2011)
- (Brazil) SESI São Paulo (2011–2012)
- (Brazil) Nestlé Osasco (2012–2017)
- (Brazil) SESC-RJ (2017–)

== Awards ==
=== Individuals ===
- 2010 U20 South American Championship – "Most valuable player"
- 2014 U22 South American Championship – "Best outside spiker"

=== Clubs ===
- 2012–13 Brazilian Superliga – Runner-up, with Sollys Nestlé
- 2014–15 Brazilian Superliga – Runner-up, with Molico/Osasco
- 2016–17 Brazilian Superliga – Runner-up, with Molico/Osasco
- 2017–18 Brazilian Superliga – Runner-up, with Rexona-SESC
- 2012 South American Club Championship – Champion, with Sollys Nestlé
- 2014 South American Club Championship – Runner-up, with Molico/Osasco
- 2015 South American Club Championship – Runner-up, with Molico/Osasco
- 2018 South American Club Championship – Runner-up, with Rexona-SESC
- 2012 FIVB Club World Championship – Champion, with Sollys Nestlé
- 2014 FIVB Club World Championship – Runner-up, with Molico/Osasco
