= Juciely Cristina Barreto =

Brazilian volleyball player (born 1980)

Juciely Cristina da Silva
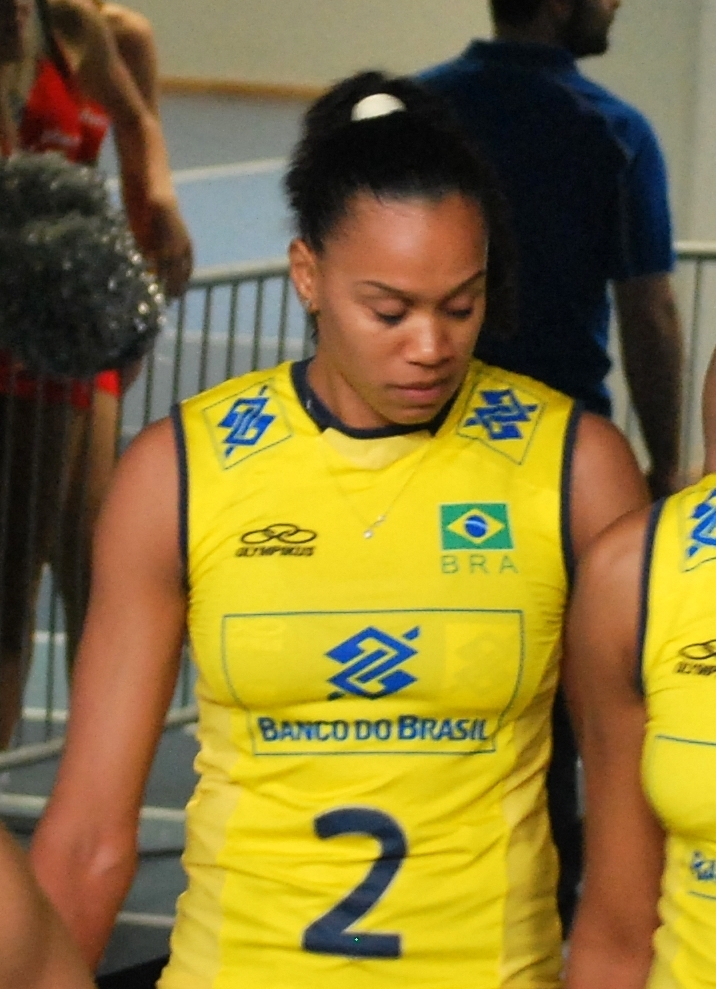
- Da Silva in 2012

Personal information
- Full name: Juciely Cristina da Silva
- Born: 18 December 1980 (age 45); João Monlevade, Minas Gerais, Brazil
- Height: 1.84 m (6 ft 0 in)
- Weight: 71 kg (157 lb)
- Spike: 312 cm (123 in)
- Block: 289 cm (114 in)

Volleyball information
- Position: Middle blocker (Universal)

National team
| 2010–2016 | Brazil |
Honours
Women's volleyball
Representing Brazil
World Grand Prix
| Gold medal – first place | 2013 Sapporo | Team |
| Gold medal – first place | 2016 Bangkok | Team |
| Silver medal – second place | 2011 Macau | Team |
| Silver medal – second place | 2012 Ningbo | Team |
| Bronze medal – third place | 2015 Omaha | Team |
Pan American Games
| Gold medal – first place | 2011 Guadalajara | Team |
South American Championship
| Gold medal – first place | 2011 Lima | Team |
| Gold medal – first place | 2013 Ica | Team |
| Gold medal – first place | 2015 Cartagena | Team |

Juciely Cristina da Silva (born 18 December 1980) is a Brazilian volleyball player. She is part of the Brazil women's national volleyball team. With her club Rio de Janeiro Vôlei Clube she competed at the 2013, 2015 and 2016 FIVB Volleyball Women's Club World Championship.

== Clubs ==
- (Brazil) Ipatinga (1999–2000)
- (Brazil) Macaé (2000–2001)
- (Brazil) Minas Tênis Clube (2001–2003)
- (Brazil) Osasco Vôlei (2003–2004)
- (Brazil) Brusque (2004–2007)
- (Brazil) Minas Tênis Clube (2007–2008)
- (Brazil) São Caetano (2009–2010)
- (Brazil) Rio de Janeiro (2010–)

== Awards ==
=== Individuals ===
- 2012–13 Brazilian Superliga –"Best Blocker"
- 2015 FIVB World Grand Prix – "Best Middle Blocker"

=== Clubs ===
- 2013 FIVB Club World Championship – Runner-up, with Rexona/Ades
- 2017 FIVB Club World Championship – Runner-up, with Rexona/SESC
- 2012–13 Brazilian Superliga – Champion, with Unilever Vôlei
- 2013–14 Brazilian Superliga – Champion, with Rexona/Ades
- 2014–15 Brazilian Superliga – Champion, with Rexona/Ades
- 2015–16 Brazilian Superliga – Champion, with Rexona/Ades
- 2016–17 Brazilian Superliga – Champion, with Rexona/SESC
- 2017–18 Brazilian Superliga – Runner-up, with SESC Rio
- 2013 Club South American Championship – Champion, with Unilever Vôlei
- 2015 Club South American Championship – Champion, with Rexona/Ades
- 2016 Club South American Championship – Champion, with Rexona/Ades
- 2017 Club South American Championship – Champion, with Rexona/SESC
- 2018 Club South American Championship – Runner-up, with SESC Rio

Awards
| Preceded by (Brazil) Fabiana Claudino (Russia) Irina Fetisova | Best Middle Blocker of FIVB World Grand Prix; 2015 ex aequo (United States) Christa Harmotto | Succeeded by (United States) Rachael Adams (Brazil) Thaísa Menezes |
| Preceded by (Brazil) Fabiana Claudino (Peru) Mirtha Uribe | Best Middle Blocker of South American Championship; 2015 ex aequo (Argentina) Natalia Aizpurúa | Succeeded by (Argentina) Julieta Lazcano (Brazil) Ana Carolina da Silva |
