= Amanda Francisco =

Brazilian volleyball player (born 1988)

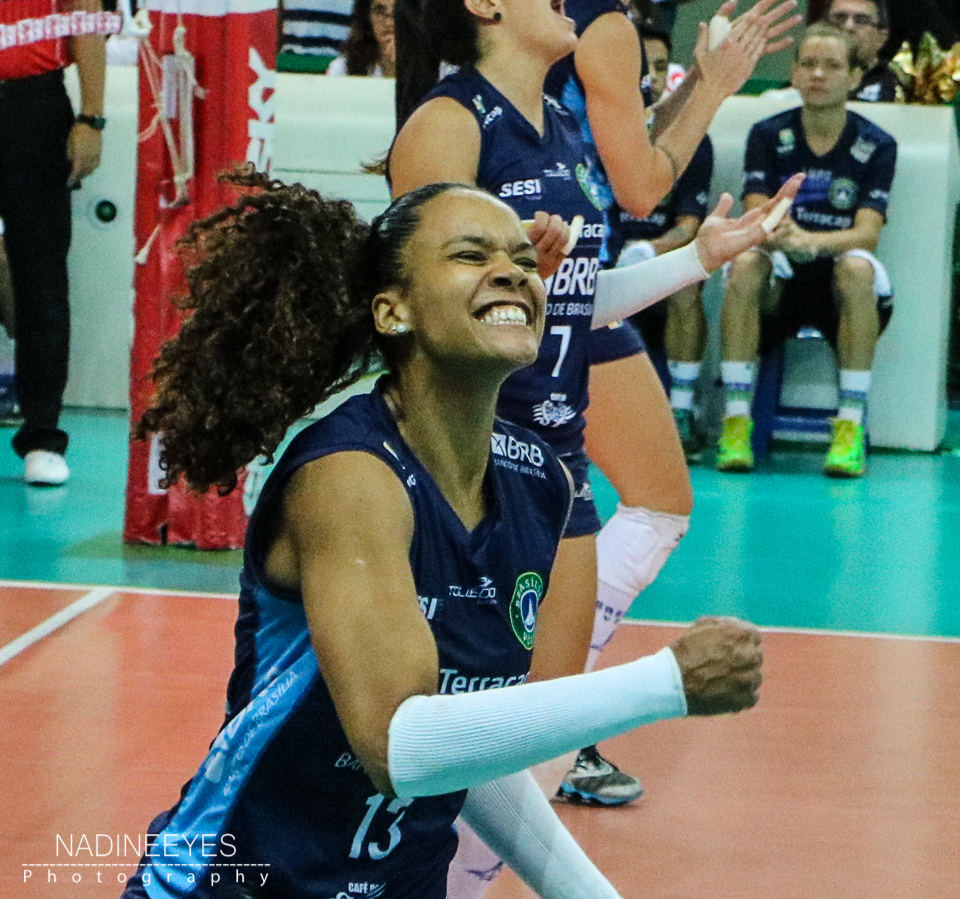

Personal information
- Full name: Amanda Juliana Campos Francisco
- Born: 16 August 1988 (age 38); Recife, Pernambuco, Brazil
- Height: 1.80 m (5 ft 11 in)
- Weight: 62 kg (137 lb)
- Spike: 304 cm (120 in)
- Block: 286 cm (113 in)

Volleyball information
- Position: Outside spiker
- Current club: PTT Spor Kulübü
- Number: 13

National team
2017–2019	Brazil
Honours
Women's volleyball
Representing Brazil
World Grand Champions Cup
Silver medal – second place	2017 Japan	Team
Nations League
Silver medal – second place	2019 Nanjing	Team
World Grand Prix
Gold medal – first place	2017 Nanjing	Team
Montreux Volley Masters
Gold medal – first place	2017 Switzerland	Team
South American Championship
Gold medal – first place	2017 Cali
Gold medal – first place	2019 Cajamarca

Amanda Francisco (born 16 August 1988) is a Brazilian volleyball player. She competed with her club Rexona Ades at the 2015 FIVB Volleyball Women's Club World Championship.

== Clubs ==
- (Brazil) Rio de Janeiro (2004–2015)
- (Brazil) Brasília Vôlei (2015–2017)
- (Brazil) Dentil Praia Clube (2017–2018)
- (Brazil) Hinode Barueri (2018–2019)
- (Brazil) Sesc-RJ (2019–2021)
- (Turkey) PTT Spor Kulübü (2021–)

== Awards ==
=== Clubs ===
- 2005–06 Brazilian Superliga – Champion, with Rexona Ades
- 2006–07 Brazilian Superliga – Champion, with Rexona Ades
- 2007–08 Brazilian Superliga – Champion, with Rexona Ades
- 2008–09 Brazilian Superliga – Champion, with Rexona Ades
- 2010–11 Brazilian Superliga – Champion, with Unilever Vôlei
- 2012–13 Brazilian Superliga – Champion, with Unilever Vôlei
- 2013–14 Brazilian Superliga – Champion, with Unilever Vôlei
- 2014–15 Brazilian Superliga – Champion, with Rexona Ades
- 2017–18 Brazilian Superliga – Champion, with Dentil Praia Clube
- 2009 South American Club Championship – Runner-Up, with Rexona/Ades
- 2013 South American Club Championship – Champion, with Unilever Vôlei
- 2015 South American Club Championship – Champion, with Unilever Vôlei
- 2013 FIVB Club World Championship – Runner-Up, with Unilever Vôlei
