= Tandara Caixeta =

Brazilian professional volleyball player

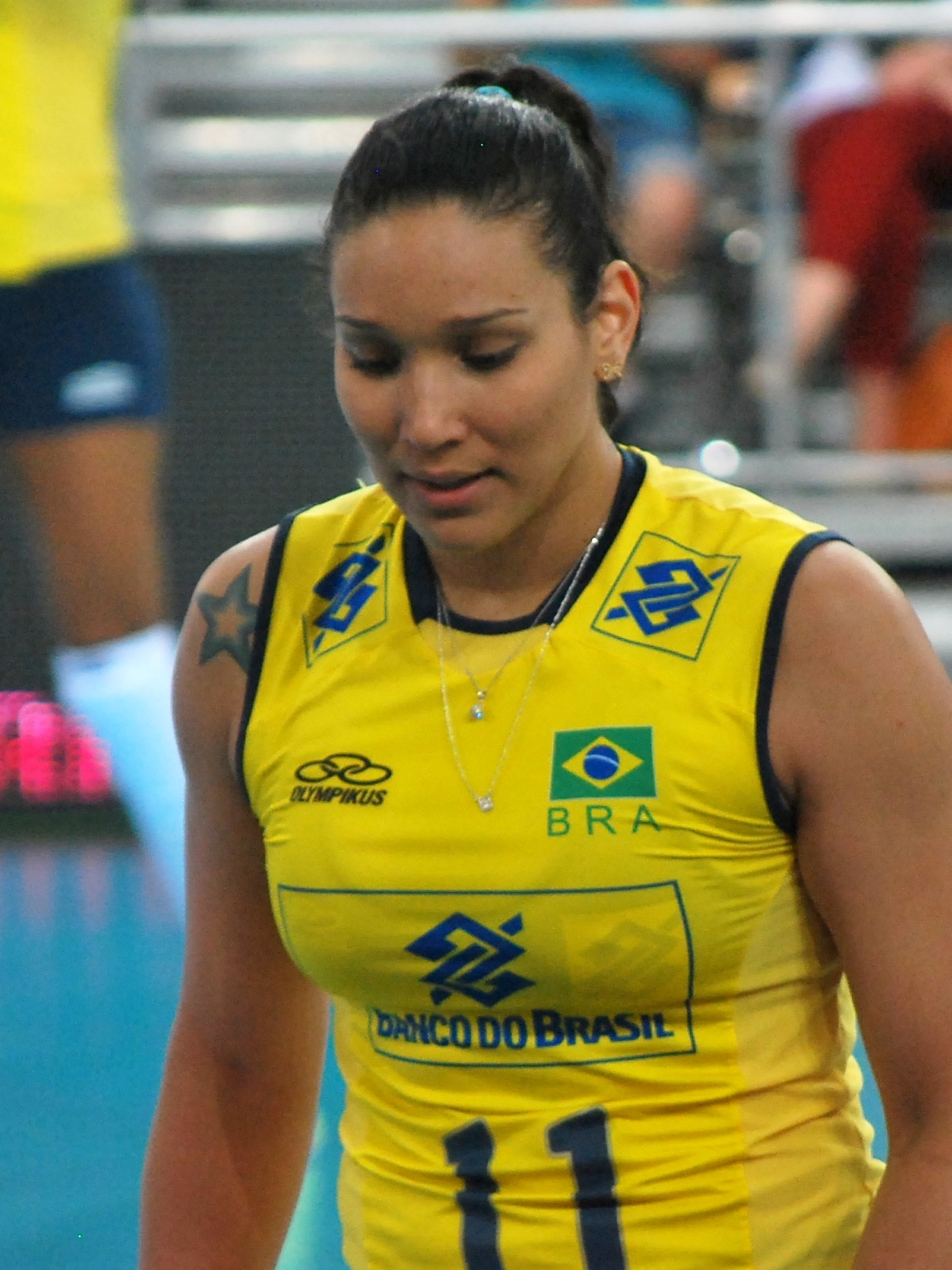
- Caixeta at the 2012 FIVB World Grand Prix

Personal information
- Full name: Tandara Alves Caixeta
- Born: 30 October 1988 (age 38); Brasília, DF, Brazil
- Height: 1.84 m (6 ft 0 in)
- Weight: 87 kg (192 lb)
- Spike: 305 cm (120 in)
- Block: 297 cm (117 in)

Volleyball information
- Position: Opposite spiker / Outside Spiker
- Current club: Osasco
- Number: 11

National team
2011–2022	Brazil
Honours
Representing Brazil
Olympic Games
Gold medal – first place	2012 London	Team
Silver medal – second place	2020 Tokyo	Team
World Championship
Bronze medal – third place	2014 Italy	Team
World Grand Champions Cup
Gold medal – first place	2013 Japan	Team
Silver medal – second place	2017 Japan	Team
World Grand Prix
Gold medal – first place	2014 Tokyo	Team
Gold medal – first place	2017 Nanjing	Team
Silver medal – second place	2011 Macau	Team
FIVB Nations League
Silver medal – second place	2021 Rimini	Team
Pan American Games
Gold medal – first place	2011 Guadalajara	Team
Montreux Volley Masters
Gold medal – first place	2017 Switzerland	Team
South American Championship
Gold medal – first place	2011 Callao
Gold medal – first place	2017 Cali

Tandara Alves Caixeta (born 30 October 1988) is a Brazilian professional volleyball player. She plays for the Brazil women's national volleyball team and for Sesc-Rio in the Brazilian Superliga. She competed for Brazil in the 2012 Summer Olympics, winning a gold medal. She is 1.84 m (6 ft 0 in) tall. She is the daughter of Evaldo Caixeta, a former amateur player with Banco do Brasil Athletic Association. At the age of nine, after trying many different sports, she saw a TV advert and decided to go to a volleyball trial. In 2005, she played with Associação Desportiva Brusque. In 2005, at the age of 16, she played for Brasil Telecom/São Bernardo.

In 2011, she was selected for the Brazil team for the first time and won gold in the 2011 Pan American Games in Guadalajara before becoming an Olympic champion in London in 2012. She has twice been the top scorer in the Brazilian Women's Superliga. She is known for breaking records in the Brazilian Superliga. In the 2013/2014 season, she broke the record for most points in a match; she scored 37 points. In the 2017/2018 season, she broke her own record, scoring 39 points, as well as scoring 626 points in the season, which this also the highest mark in the country. Again in the 2019/2020 season, she broke her record, scoring an unbelievable 40 points in 4 sets, the highest mark in the history of volleyball on the Brazilian courts.

Caixeta won the 2017 South American Championship Most Valuable Player award. She later won the 2017 FIVB World Grand Champions Cup Best Opposite Spiker award.

During the 2020 Summer Olympics, she was provisionally suspended for doping ahead of Brazil's semi-final against South Korea. Brazil ultimately won the silver medal at the tournament, and though suspended, Caixeta was still listed as a medalist, pending the outcome of the doping investigation. In 2022, she was issued with a 4-year ban backdated to July 2021 for an anti-doping rule violation for testing positive for ostarine. In July 2025, she received a two-year extension to ban set to expire in July 2027 for participating in a volleyball event in 2024 during her sanction period.

== Clubs ==
- (Brazil) A.D. Brusque (2005–2007)
- (Brazil) Grêmio de Vôlei Osasco (2007–2008)
- (Brazil) E.C. Pinheiros (2008–2009)
- (Brazil) A.D. Brusque (2009–2010)
- (Brazil) Vôlei Futuro (2010–2011)
- (Brazil) Sollys Osasco (2011–2012)
- (Brazil) SESI-SP (2012–2013)
- (Brazil) Vôlei Amil Campinas (2013–2014)
- (Brazil) Praia Clube (2014–2015)
- (Brazil) Minas Tênis Clube (2015–2016)
- (Brazil) Nestle Osasco (2016–2018)
- (China) Guangdong Evergrande (2018–2019)
- (Brazil) SESC Rio (2019–2020)
- (Brazil) Osasco/Audax (2020–2022)
- (Peru) Alianza Lima Voley Club Alianza Lima (2025–2026)

== Awards ==
=== Individuals ===
- 2012–13 Brazilian Superliga – "Best scorer"
- 2013–14 Brazilian Superliga – "Best scorer"
- 2013–14 Brazilian Superliga – "Best server"
- 2016–17 Brazilian Superliga – "Best scorer"
- 2016–17 Brazilian Superliga – "Best server"
- 2017 South American Championship – "Most valuable player"
- 2017 FIVB World Grand Champions Cup – "Best opposite spiker"
- 2017–18 Brazilian Superliga – "Most valuable player"
- 2017–18 Brazilian Superliga – "Best scorer"
- 2017–18 Brazilian Superliga – "Best spiker"
- 2018 FIVB Nations League – "Best opposite spiker"
- 2021 FIVB Nations League – "Best opposite spiker"

=== Clubs ===
- 2007–08 Brazilian Superliga – Runner Up, with Molico Osasco
- 2011–12 Brazilian Superliga – Champion, with Sollys Nestlé
- 2016–17 Brazilian Superliga – Runner Up, with Vôlei Nestlé
- 2020–21 Brazilian Superliga – Bronze medal, with Osasco Audax/São Cristovão Saúde

Awards
Preceded by (Brazil) Gabriela Guimarães	Most Valuable Player of South American Championship; 2017	Succeeded by Lorenne Teixeira
Preceded by (Dominican Republic) Gina Mambrú	Best Opposite Spiker of World Grand Champions Cup; 2017	Succeeded by TBD
Preceded by -	Best Opposite Spiker of FIVB Nations League; 2018; 2021	Succeeded by (Turkey) Ebrar Karakurt (Italy) Paola Egonu
