= Drussyla Costa =

Brazilian beach volleyball player

Personal information
- Full name: Drussyla Andressa Felix Costa
- Born: June 1, 1996 (age 30); João Pessoa, Paraíba, Brazil
- Hometown: Rio de Janeiro
- Height: 1.83 m (6 ft 0 in)
- Weight: 75 kg (165 lb)
- Spike: 304 cm (120 in)
- Block: 286 cm (113 in)

Volleyball information
- Position: Outside spiker
- Current club: Sesc-RJ
- Number: 17

National team
2017–2019	Brazil
Honours
Women's volleyball
Representing Brazil
World Grand Prix
Gold medal – first place	2017 Nanjing	Team
FIVB Nations League
Silver medal – second place	2026 Macau	Team
Montreux Volley Masters
Gold medal – first place	2017 Switzerland	Team
South American Championship
Gold medal – first place	2017 Cali
Gold medal – first place	2019 Cajamarca
- Last updated: 1 September 2019

Drussyla Andressa Felix Costa (born July 1, 1996) is a Brazilian beach volleyball player who has represented her country in junior and youth world championships and the South American Beach Volleyball Circuit. She was part of the first U16 Brazil national indoor volleyball team that won gold at the first edition of the first U16 South American Championship. Drussyla was a member of the Brazilian national team that won its first U-23 World Championship in a final against Turkey.

== Career ==
=== Indoor Volleyball ===
Drussyla was picked to be a part of Brazil's team in the inaugural U16 South American Championship held in November 2011 in Canelones, Uruguay where she took gold with her team. She was named MVP of the tournament.

During the 2015 FIVB Club World Championship, Costa played with the Brazilian club Rexona Ades Rio and her team lost the bronze medal match to the Swiss Voléro Zürich,

=== Beach Volleyball ===
Drussyla began representing Brazil in the South American Circuit at the Bolivian Open of the 2012 Continental Cup. Brazil's team took gold, however none of the pairings qualified due to the Olympic Qualification quota for the country already being filled.

Drussyla participated in the 2012 Youth and Junior Beach Volleyball World Championships, she partnered with Eduarda Santos in the Youth tournament finishing in sixth place, and also partnered with Santos in the Junior championship, earning the Silver Medal.

== Clubs ==
- (Brazil) Fluminense FC (2011–2013)
- (Brazil) Sesc-RJ (2013–2019)
- (Brazil) SESI Volei Bauru (2020–2021)
- (Brazil) Osasco (2022)
- (Romania) CSM Volei Alba-Blaj (2023– 2024)

== Awards ==
=== Individuals ===
- 2011 U16 South American Championship – "Most valuable player"
- 2014 U20 South American Championship – "Most valuable player"
- 2018 South American Club Championship – "Best outside spiker"

=== Clubs ===
- 2014–15 Brazilian Superliga – Champion, with Rexona/Ades
- 2015–16 Brazilian Superliga – Champion, with Rexona/Ades
- 2016–17 Brazilian Superliga – Champion, with Rexona/SESC
- 2017–18 Brazilian Superliga – Runner-up, with SESC Rio
- 2017 South American Club Championship – Champion, with Rexona/SESC
- 2018 South American Club Championship – Runner-up, with SESC Rio
- 2017 FIVB Club World Championship – Runner-up, with Rexona/SESC
