= Mara Ferreira Leão =

Brazilian volleyball player (born 1991)

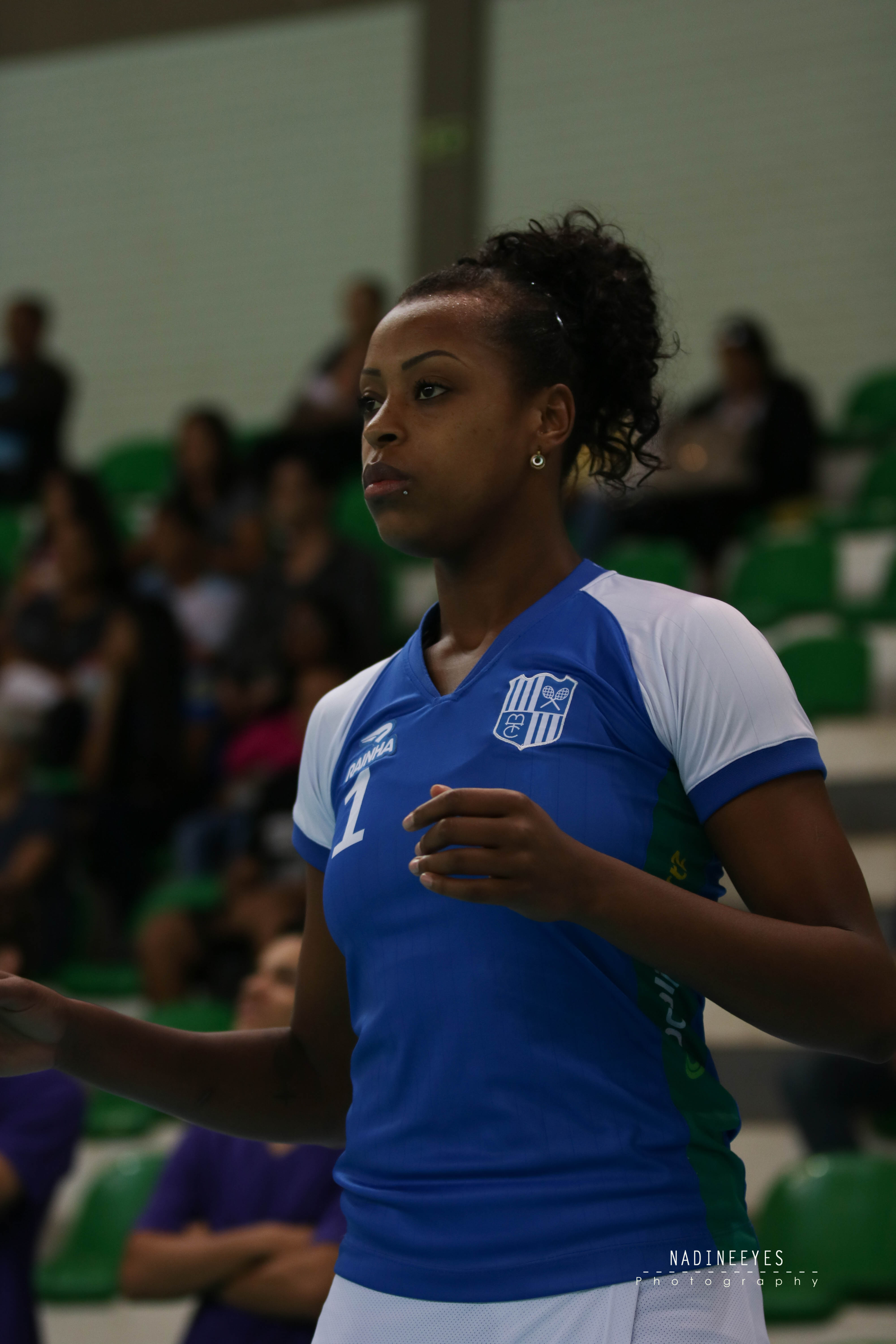

Personal information
- Full name: Mara Ferreira Leão
- Born: 26 July 1991 (age 35); Sabinópolis, Minas Gerais, Brazil
- Height: 1.90 m (6 ft 3 in)
- Weight: 81 kg (179 lb)
- Spike: 320 cm (130 in)
- Block: 301 cm (119 in)

Volleyball information
- Position: Middle blocker
- Current club: (Peru) Universitario de Deportes
- Number: 8

National team
2015–2019	Brazil
Honours
Women's volleyball
Representing Brazil
World Grand Champions Cup
Silver medal – second place	2017 Japan	Team
Nations League
Silver medal – second place	2019 Nanjing	Team
World Grand Prix
Gold medal – first place	2017 Nanjing	Team
Bronze medal – third place	2015 Omaha	Team
Montreux Volley Masters
Gold medal – first place	2017 Switzerland	Team
South American Championship
Gold medal – first place	2019 Cajamarca
Gold medal – first place	2017 Cali

Mara Ferreira Leão (born 26 July 1991) is a Brazilian volleyball player who has represented her country in world championships. She is a member of Universitario de Deportes of Perú and a member of the Brazil women's national volleyball team. She was part of the Brazil national indoor volleyball team at the 2017 FIVB Volleyball World Grand Prix, the 2018 FIVB Volleyball Women's Nations League, and the 2016 Montreux Volley Masters.

== Clubs ==
- (Brazil) Rio de Janeiro (2008–2013)
- (Brazil) São Caetano (2013–2015)
- (Brazil) Minas Tênis Clube (2015–2019)
- (Brazil) Osasco Audax (2019–2020)
- (Brazil) Sesi Vôlei Bauru (2020–)

== Awards ==
=== Individuals ===
- 2016–17 Brazilian Superliga – "Best Blocker"
- 2019 South American Championship – "Best Middle Blocker"

=== Clubs ===
- 2010–11 Brazilian Superliga – Champion, with Rio de Janeiro
- 2012–13 Brazilian Superliga – Champion, with Rio de Janeiro
- 2018–19 Brazilian Superliga – Champion, with Minas Tênis Clube
- 2009 South American Club Championship – Runner-up, with Rio de Janeiro
- 2013 South American Club Championship – Champion, with Rio de Janeiro
- 2018 South American Club Championship – Champion, with Minas Tênis Clube
- 2019 South American Club Championship – Champion, with Minas Tênis Clube
- 2018 FIVB Club World Championship – Runner-up, with Minas Tênis Clube
