= Regiane Bidias =

Brazilian volleyball player

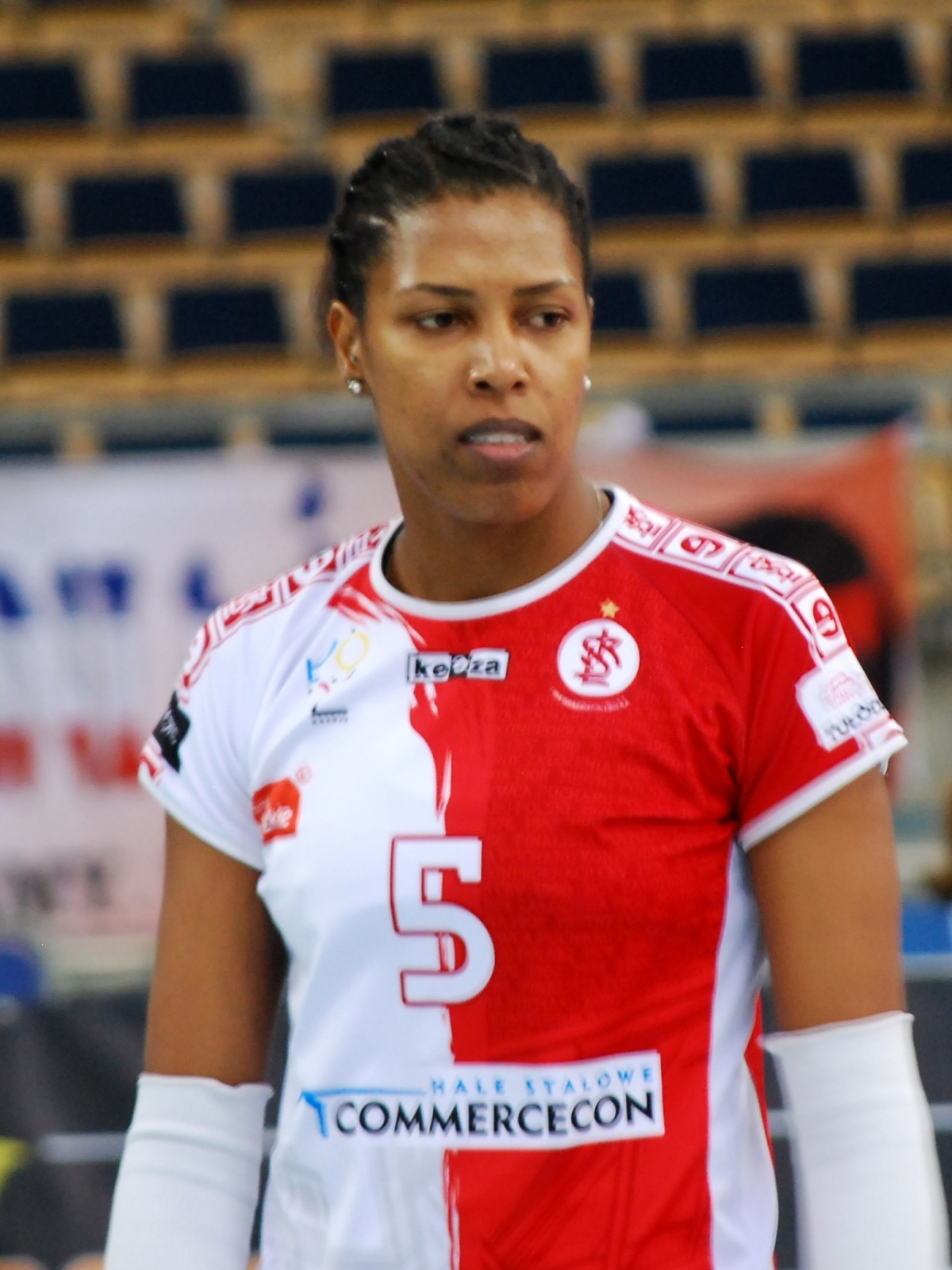

Personal information
- Full name: Regiane Fernanda Aparecida Bidias
- Born: October 2, 1986 (age 40); Piracicaba, São Paulo, Brazil
- Height: 1.90 m (6 ft 3 in)
- Weight: 74 kg (163 lb)
- Spike: 304 cm (120 in)
- Block: 286 cm (113 in)

Volleyball information
- Position: Wing spiker
- Current club: ŁKS Commercecon Łódź
- Number: 5

National team
2007–2009	Brazil
Honours
Women's volleyball
Representing Brazil
World Grand Prix
Gold medal – first place	2009 Tokyo	Team
Montreux Volley Masters
Gold medal – first place	2009 Switzerland
Pan American Games
Silver medal – second place	2007 Rio de Janeiro	Team
Pan-American Cup
Gold medal – first place	2009 Miami
Silver medal – second place	2008 Tijuana/Mexicali

Regiane Fernanda Aparecida Bidias (born October 2, 1986) is a Brazilian volleyball player, a member of the Brazil women's national volleyball team.

== Clubs ==
- (Brazil) Rio de Janeiro (2004–2017)
- (Poland) ŁKS Commercecon Łódź (2017–2019)
- (Italy) Bartoccini Gioiellerie Perugia (2019–)
- (Poland) UNI OPOLE (2021-2022)

== Awards ==
=== Individuals ===
- 2004 U20 South American Championship – "Most Valuable Player"
- 2004 U20 South American Championship – "Best Spiker"
- 2009 Final Four Cup – "Best Spiker"
- 2018–19 Polish League – "Most Valuable Player"

=== Clubs ===
- 2004–05 Brazilian Superliga – Runner-up, with Rexona-Ades
- 2005–06 Brazilian Superliga – Champion, with Rexona-Ades
- 2006–07 Brazilian Superliga – Champion, with Rexona-Ades
- 2007–08 Brazilian Superliga – Champion, with Rexona-Ades
- 2008–09 Brazilian Superliga – Champion, with Rexona-Ades
- 2009–10 Brazilian Superliga – Runner-up, with Unilever Vôlei
- 2010–11 Brazilian Superliga – Champion, with Unilever Vôlei
- 2011–12 Brazilian Superliga – Runner-up, with Unilever Vôlei
- 2012–13 Brazilian Superliga – Champion, with Unilever Vôlei
- 2013–14 Brazilian Superliga – Champion, with Rexona-Ades
- 2014–15 Brazilian Superliga – Champion, with Rexona-Ades
- 2015–16 Brazilian Superliga – Champion, with Rexona-Ades
- 2016–17 Brazilian Superliga – Champion, with Rexona-SESC
- 2017–18 Polish League – Runner-up, with ŁKS Commercecon Łódź
- 2018–19 Polish League – Champion, with ŁKS Commercecon Łódź
- 2009 South American Club Championship – Champion, with Rexona-Ades
- 2013 South American Club Championship – Champion, with Unilever Vôlei
- 2015 South American Club Championship – Champion, with Rexona-Ades
- 2016 South American Club Championship – Champion, with Rexona-Ades
- 2017 South American Club Championship – Champion, with Rexona-Sesc
- 2013 FIVB Club World Championship – Runner-up, with Rexona-Ades
- 2017 FIVB Club World Championship – Runner-up, with Rexona-Sesc

=== National team ===
- 2002 U20 South American Championship
- 2004 U20 South American Championship
- 2005 FIVB U20 World Championship
- 2007 Pan American Games
- 2008 Pan-American Cup
- 2009 Pan-American Cup
- 2009 Montreux Volley Masters
- 2009 World Grand Prix
- 2011 Summer Universiade
- 2013 Summer Universiade
