= Macris Carneiro =

Brazilian volleyball player (born 1989)

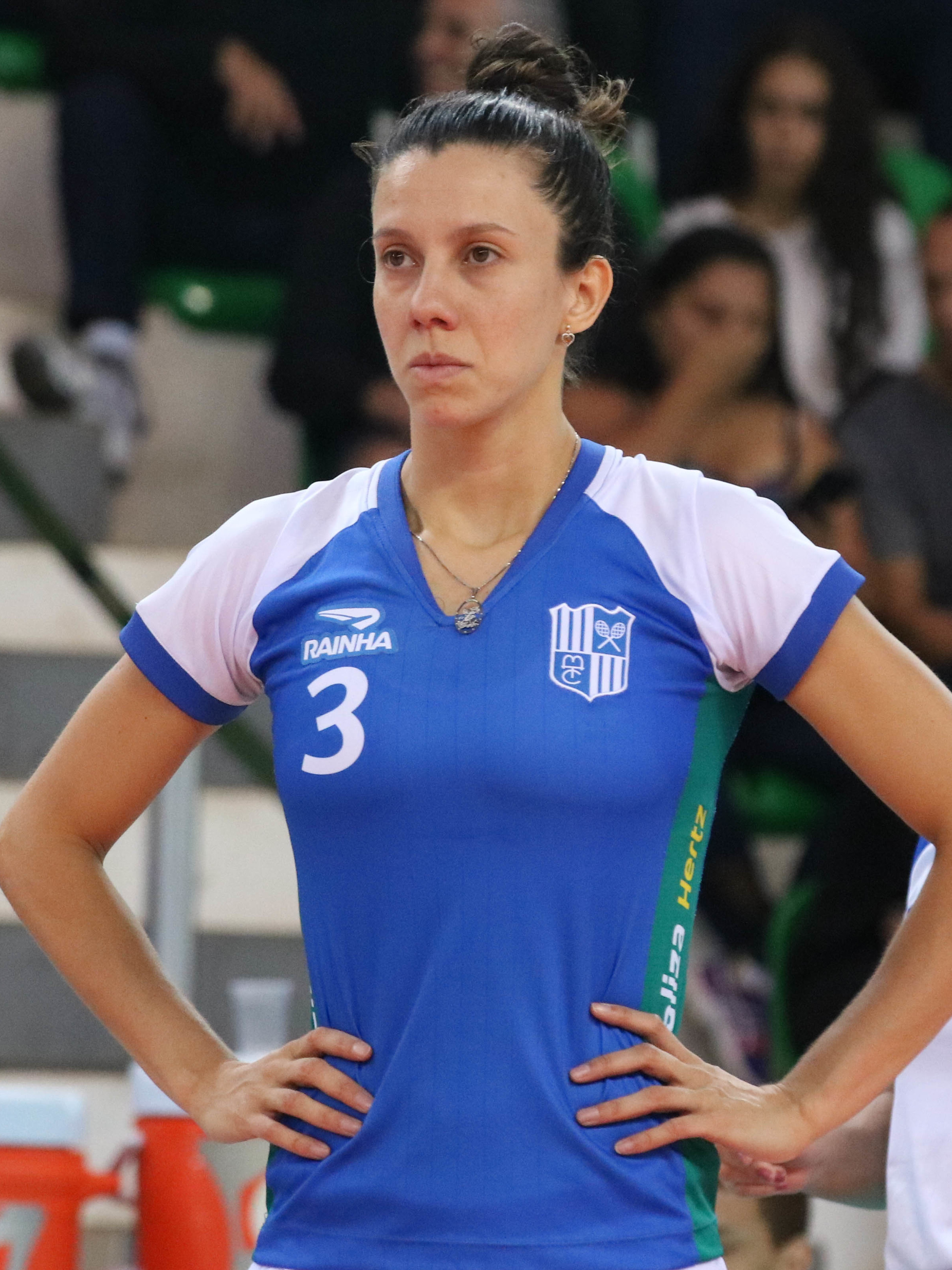
- Carneiro in 2018

Personal information
- Full name: Macris Fernanda Silva Carneiro
- Born: March 3, 1989 (age 37); Santo André, São Paulo, Brazil
- Height: 1.78 m (5 ft 10 in)
- Weight: 68 kg (150 lb)
- Spike: 292 cm (115 in)
- Block: 285 cm (112 in)

Volleyball information
- Position: Setter
- Current club: (Brazil) Praia Clube
- Number: 3

Career
Years	Teams
2010–11	(Brazil) BMG/São Bernardo
2011–12	(Brazil) São Caetano
2012–15	(Brazil) EC Pinheiros
2015–17	(Brazil) Terracap/BRB/Brasília Vôlei
2017–2022	(Brazil) Itambé/Minas
2022–2023	(Turkey) Fenerbahçe S.K.
2023-2024	(Turkey) Türk Hava Yolları
2024-	(Brazil) Praia Clube

National team
Brazil
Honours
Women's volleyball
Representing Brazil
Olympic Games
Silver medal – second place	2020 Tokyo	Team
Bronze medal – third place	2024 Paris	Team
FIVB World Championship
Silver medal – second place	2022 Poland/Netherlands	Team
Bronze medal – third place	2025 Thailand	Team
FIVB World Grand Prix
Bronze medal – third place	2015 Omaha	Team
Gold medal – first place	2017 Nanjing	Team
FIVB Nations League
Silver medal – second place	2019 Nanjing	Team
Silver medal – second place	2021 Rimini	Team
Silver medal – second place	2022 Ankara	Team
Silver medal – second place	2025 Łódź
Silver medal – second place	2026 Macau
Pan American Games
Silver medal – second place	2015 Toronto	Team
South American Championship
Gold medal – first place	2017 Cali
Gold medal – first place	2019 Cajamarca
Gold medal – first place	2021 Barrancabermeja
Gold medal – first place	2023 Recife

Macris Fernanda Silva Carneiro (Brazilian Portuguese: [maˈkɾis feʁˈnɐ̃dɐ ˈsiwvɐ kaʁˈnejɾu]; born March 3, 1989), is a volleyball player from Brazil.

She plays as setter, playing in Fenerbahçe S.K., and for the Brazilian National Team.

She competed at the 2019 FIVB Volleyball Women's Nations League, and the 2020 and 2024 Summer Olympics.

== Awards ==
=== Individuals ===
- 2013–14 Brazilian Superliga – "Best Setter"
- 2014–15 Brazilian Superliga – "Best Setter"
- 2015–16 Brazilian Superliga – "Best Setter"
- 2016–17 Brazilian Superliga – "Best Setter"
- 2018 South American Club Championship - "Best Setter"
- 2018–19 Brazilian Superliga – "Most Valuable Player"
- 2018–19 Brazilian Superliga – "Best Setter"
- 2018 Club World Championship - "Best Setter"
- 2019 South American Club Championship - "Best Setter"
- 2019 FIVB Nations League - "Best Setter"
- 2019–20 Brazilian Superliga – "Best Setter"
- 2020 South American Club Championship - "Best Setter"
- 2020–21 Brazilian Superliga – "Best Setter"
- 2021–22 Brazilian Superliga – "Best Setter"
- 2021–22 Brazilian Superliga – "Most Valuable Player"
- 2022 South American Club Championship - "Best Setter"
- 2022–23 Turkish Volleyball League – "Best Setter"
- 2024–2025 Women's South American Volleyball Club Championships - "Best Setter"

=== Clubs ===
- 2017–18 Brazilian Superliga – Bronze medal, with Camponesa/Minas
- 2018–19 Brazilian Superliga – Champion, with Itambé/Minas
- 2020–21 Brazilian Superliga – Champion, with Itambé/Minas
- 2021–22 Brazilian Superliga – Champion, with Itambé/Minas
- 2018 South American Club Championship – Champion, with Camponesa/Minas
- 2019 South American Club Championship – Champion, with Itambé/Minas
- 2020 South American Club Championship – Champion, with Itambé/Minas
- 2018 FIVB Club World Championship – Runner-up, with Itambé/Minas
- 2022 South American Club Championship – Champion, with Itambé/Minas
- 2021–22 Turkish Super Cup - Champion, with Fenerbahçe Opet
- 2021–22 Turkish Cup – (silver) runner-up with Fenerbahçe
- 2022–23 Turkish Volleyball League Champion, with Fenerbahçe Opet

Awards
Preceded by (Turkey) Cansu Özbay	Best Setter of FIVB Nations League; 2019	Succeeded by (United States) Jordyn Poulter
