= Rosamaria Montibeller =

Brazilian volleyball player (born 1994)

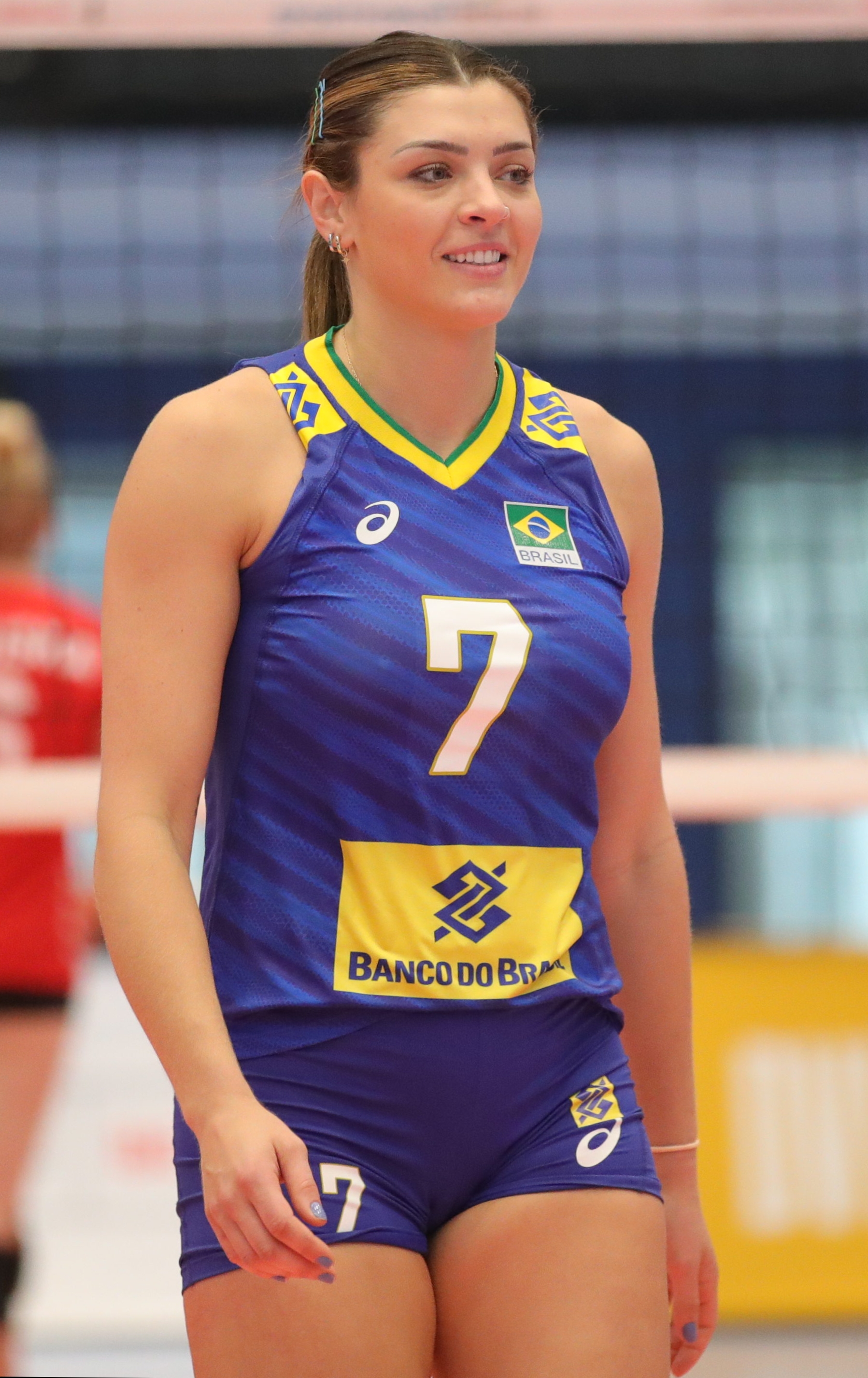
- Montibeller in 2022

Personal information
- Nickname: Rosa
- Nationality: (Brazil) Brazilian
- Born: 9 April 1994 (age 32) Nova Trento, Santa Catarina, Brazil
- Height: 1.85 m (6 ft 1 in)
- Weight: 76 kg (168 lb)
- Spike: 290 cm (114 in)
- Block: 285 cm (112 in)

Volleyball information
- Position: Opposite spiker / Outside spiker
- Current club: (Japan) Denso Airybees
- Number: 7

Career
- Years: Team
- 2011–2013 2013–2014 2014–2015 2015–2018 2018–2019 2019–2020 2020–2021 2021–2022 2022–2023 2023–: (Brazil) São Caetano (Brazil) Vôlei Amil/Campinas (Brazil) E.C. Pinheiros (Brazil) Minas Tênis Clube (Brazil) Dentil Praia Clube (Italy) Bartoccini Perugia (Italy) Pomí Casalmaggiore (Italy) Igor Gorgonzola Novara (Italy) Unet E-Work Busto Arsizio (Japan) Denso Airybees

National team
- Years: Team
- 2015–: Brazil
Honours
Women's volleyball
Representing Brazil
Olympic Games
Silver medal – second place	2020 Tokyo	Team
Bronze medal – third place	2024 Paris	Team
FIVB World Championship
Silver medal – second place	2022 Poland/Netherlands	Team
Bronze medal – third place	2025 Thailand	Team
World Grand Champions Cup
Silver medal – second place	2017 Japan	Team
FIVB Nations League
Silver medal – second place	2021 Rimini	Team
Silver medal – second place	2022 Ankara	Team
Silver medal – second place	2025 Łódź
Silver medal – second place	2026 Macau
World Grand Prix
Gold medal – first place	2017 Nanjing	Team
Pan American Games
Silver medal – second place	2015 Toronto	Team
South American Championship
Gold medal – first place	2017 Cali
Gold medal – first place	2021 Barrancabermeja
Gold medal – first place	2023 Recife
Gold medal – first place	2026 Rio de Janeiro
Montreux Volley Masters
Gold medal – first place	2017 Switzerland	Team
U23 World Championship
Gold medal – first place	2015 Ankara
U20 World Championship
Bronze medal – third place	2013 Brno
U20 South American Championship
Gold medal – first place	2012 Lima

Rosamaria Montibeller (Brazilian Portuguese: [ʁozɐmaˈɾiɐ mõtʃibeˈleʁ]; born 9 April 1994) is a Brazilian volleyball player. She usually plays as an opposite spiker and occasionally as a wing spiker. A part of Brazil women's national volleyball team ever since winning silver at the 2015 Pan American Games in Toronto, she has since won two medals in the Olympic Games, silver in Tokyo 2020 and bronze in Paris 2024.

== Early life ==
She comes from a family of Italian origins.

== Career ==
She began playing the sport of volleyball at the age of nine during a local youth project.

=== Club career ===
She began her career in 2011, making her debut for São Caetano in the Superliga Série A. She played for São Caetano until 2013. Then, she played for Campinas Voleibol Clube from 2013 to 2014. She represented Minas Tênis Clube from 2015 to 2018 for a period of three years, where she won the 2018 Women's South American Volleyball Club Championship. The club also subsequently qualified to participate at the 2018 FIVB Volleyball Women's Club World Championship after winning the 2018 South American Championship.

She later switched to Praia Clube at the end of the 2018 season and eventually won the Brazilian Super Cup with the club in 2019. She was also part of the Dentil Praia Clube which emerged as runners-up to Minas Tênis Clube at the 2018/19 Brazilian Women's Volleyball Superliga and was also a key member of the Dentil Praia Clube which emerged as runners-up in the 2019 Women's South American Volleyball Club Championship.

=== International career ===
She was a part of the Brazilian side that emerged as champions of the 2012 Women's Junior South American Volleyball Championship after defeating hosts Peru in the final. She participated at the 2013 FIVB Volleyball Women's U20 World Championship where Brazil finished in seventh position. She captained Brazil's U23 team, which won the 2015 FIVB Volleyball Women's U23 World Championship. It was also Brazil's first title in the FIVB Volleyball Women's U23 World Championship. She also competed at the 2017 FIVB Volleyball World Grand Prix, where Brazil defeated Italy in the final to be crowned as winners. She was also named in the Brazilian squad for the 2018 FIVB Volleyball Women's Nations League where Brazil finished at fourth place.

She was a member of the national which finished in seventh position at the 2018 FIVB Volleyball Women's World Championship. She also took an indefinite two-year break from international volleyball from 2019 to 2021, but returned to the national team for the 2021 FIVB Volleyball Women's Nations League, where Brazil emerged as runners-up to United States in the final.

She was also selected to the national squad to compete in the women's volleyball tournament at the 2020 Summer Olympics. She won a silver medal at the 2020 Summer Olympics after Brazil lost 21–25, 20–25, 14–25 to United States in the gold medal match of the women's volleyball tournament.

== Personal life ==
In July 2024, during an interview on the Brazilian talk show Conversa com Bial, Rosamaria publicly spoke about her relationship with a woman, stating that her girlfriend would be accompanying her to the 2024 Summer Olympics in Paris. Following this public revelation, the tabloid Purepeople reported that she had already been in a relationship with lawyer Cristal Mastrangelo for four years.

== Awards ==
=== Individuals ===
- 2012 U20 South American Championship – "Best opposite spiker"
- 2015 FIVB U23 World Championship – "Best opposite spiker"
- 2018 South American Club Championship – "Best outside spiker"

=== Clubs ===
- 2018 South American Club Championship – Champion, with Minas Tênis Clube
- 2019 South American Club Championship – Runner-up, with Dentil Praia Clube
- 2018–19 Brazilian Superliga – Runner-up, with Dentil Praia Clube
