= Mayhara Silva =

Brazilian volleyball player (born 1989)

Personal information
- Full name: Mayhara Francine da Silva
- Born: April 9, 1989 (age 37); Bauru, Brazil
- Height: 1.84 m (6 ft 0 in)
- Weight: 73 kg (161 lb)
- Spike: 320 cm (126 in)
- Block: 270 cm (106 in)

Volleyball information
- Position: Middle Blocker
- Current club: Vôlei Bauru

National team
| 2015 | Brazil |
Honours
Women's volleyball
Representing Brazil
World Grand Prix
| Bronze medal – third place | 2015 Omaha | Team |

Mayhara Francine da Silva (born April 9, 1989, in Bauru, Brazil) is a Brazilian volleyball player, a member of the Brazilian team.

== Career ==
She was part of the national team at the 2015 FIVB World Grand Prix.

She participated at the 2015 FIVB Volleyball Women's Club World Championship, and 2016 FIVB Volleyball Women's Club World Championship with Rexona-Sesc.

== Clubs ==
- (Brazil) Mackenzie (2008–2009)
- (Brazil) Uniara/AFAV (2010–2011)
- (Brazil) Sollys Osasco (2010–2011)
- (Brazil) Rio do Sul (2011–2012)
- (Brazil) Praia Clube (2012–2014)
- (Brazil) Rio de Janeiro (2014–2019)
- (Brazil) Vôlei Bauru (2019–)

== Awards ==
=== Individuals ===
- 2018 South American Club Championship – "Best Middle Blocker"

=== Clubs ===
- 2014–15 Brazilian Superliga – Champion, with Rexona-Ades
- 2015–16 Brazilian Superliga – Champion, with Rexona-Ades
- 2016–17 Brazilian Superliga – Champion, with Rexona-SESC
- 2017–18 Brazilian Superliga – Runner-up, with SESC Rio
- 2015 South American Club Championship – Champion, with Rexona-Ades
- 2016 South American Club Championship – Champion, with Rexona-Ades
- 2017 South American Club Championship – Champion, with Rexona-SESC
- 2018 South American Club Championship – Runner-up, with SESC Rio
- 2017 FIVB Club World Championship – Runner-up, with Rexona-SESC
