= 2019 Women's South American Volleyball Championship =

Tournament details
- Host country: Peru
- Dates: August 28 - September 1
- Teams: 8
- Venue: 1 (in Cajamarca host cities)

Final positions
- Champions: Brazil (21st title)

Tournament awards
- MVP: Lorenne Teixeira (BRA)

The 2019 Women's South American Volleyball Championship was the 33rd edition of the Women's South American Volleyball Championship held in Cajamarca, Peru and organised by South America's governing volleyball body, the Confederación Sudamericana de Voleibol (CSV).

== Competing nations ==
The following national teams participated:

- Argentina
- Bolivia
- Brazil
- Colombia
- Ecuador
- Peru
- Uruguay
- Venezuela

== Preliminary round ==
=== Pool A ===
Pos	Team	Pld	W	L	Pts	SW	SL	SR	SPW	SPL	SPR	Qualification
1	Brazil	3	3	0	9	9	1	9.000	248	135	1.837	Semifinals
2	Argentina	3	2	1	6	7	3	2.333	221	193	1.145	Semifinals
3	Venezuela	3	1	2	2	3	8	0.375	197	242	0.814	5th–8th place classification
4	Ecuador	3	0	3	1	2	9	0.222	163	259	0.629	5th–8th place classification

Date	Time		Score		Set 1	Set 2	Set 3	Set 4	Set 5	Total	Report
28 Aug	15:00	Brazil	3–0	Ecuador	25–8	25–9	25–10			75–27	Report
28 Aug	17:00	Argentina	3–0	Venezuela	25–16	25–13	25–22			75–51	Report
29 Aug	13:00	Argentina	3–0	Ecuador	25–16	25–15	25–13			75–44	Report
29 Aug	15:00	Brazil	3–0	Venezuela	25–10	25–16	25–11			75–37	Report
30 Aug	12:00	Venezuela	3–2	Ecuador	25–19	23–25	25–18	21–25	15–5	109–92	Report
30 Aug	14:00	Brazil	3–1	Argentina	23–25	25–19	25–16	25–11		98–71	Report

=== Pool B ===
Pos	Team	Pld	W	L	Pts	SW	SL	SR	SPW	SPL	SPR	Qualification
1	Colombia	3	3	0	8	9	2	4.500	262	162	1.617	Semifinals
2	Peru	3	2	1	7	8	3	2.667	245	187	1.310	Semifinals
3	Bolivia	3	1	2	3	3	7	0.429	151	229	0.659	5th–8th place classification
4	Uruguay	3	0	3	0	1	9	0.111	157	237	0.662	5th–8th place classification

Date	Time		Score		Set 1	Set 2	Set 3	Set 4	Set 5	Total	Report
28 Aug	13:00	Colombia	3–0	Uruguay	25–9	25–8	25–20			75–37	Report
28 Aug	19:00	Peru	3–0	Bolivia	25–12	25–11	25–11			75–34	Report
29 Aug	17:00	Colombia	3–0	Bolivia	25–8	25–6	25–16			75–30	Report
29 Aug	20:00	Peru	3–0	Uruguay	25–14	25–11	25–16			75–41	Report
30 Aug	16:00	Uruguay	1–3	Bolivia	17–25	15–25	25–12	22–25		79–87	Report
30 Aug	18:00	Peru	2–3	Colombia	22–25	25–23	26–24	13–25	9–15	95–112	Report

== Final round ==
=== 5th–8th classification ===
5th–8th semifinals
31 Aug
Venezuela	3
Uruguay	0
31 Aug
Bolivia	3
Ecuador	0

5th place match
1 Sept
Venezuela	3
Bolivia	0

==== 5th–8th semifinals ====
Date	Time		Score		Set 1	Set 2	Set 3	Set 4	Set 5	Total	Report
31 Aug	12:00	Bolivia	3–0	Ecuador	25–22	25–22	25–23			75–67	Report
31 Aug	14:00	Venezuela	3–0	Uruguay	25–15	25–9	25–14			75–38	Report

==== 5th place match ====
Date	Time		Score		Set 1	Set 2	Set 3	Set 4	Set 5	Total	Report
1 Sept	14:00	Venezuela	3–0	Bolivia	25–23	25–18	25–22			75–63	Report

=== Championship ===
Semifinals
31 Aug
Brazil	3
Peru	0
31 Aug
Colombia	3
Argentina	0

Final
1 Sept
Brazil	3
Colombia	0
Third place
1 Sept
Peru	3
Argentina	2

==== Semifinals ====
Date	Time		Score		Set 1	Set 2	Set 3	Set 4	Set 5	Total	Report
31 Aug	16:00	Colombia	3–0	Argentina	25–23	25–21	25–19			75–63	Report
31 Aug	18:00	Brazil	3–0	Peru	25–19	25–18	25–16			75–53	Report

==== Bronze medal match ====
Date	Time		Score		Set 1	Set 2	Set 3	Set 4	Set 5	Total	Report
1 Sept	16:00	Peru	3–2	Argentina	25–19	26–24	17–25	19–25	16–14	103–107	Report

==== Final ====
Date	Time		Score		Set 1	Set 2	Set 3	Set 4	Set 5	Total	Report
1 Sept	18:00	Brazil	3–0	Colombia	25–22	25–23	25–20			75–65	Report

== Final standing ==
Rank	Team
1st place, gold medalist(s)	Brazil
2nd place, silver medalist(s)	Colombia
3rd place, bronze medalist(s)	Peru
4	Argentina
5	Venezuela
6	Bolivia
7	Ecuador
7	Uruguay

2019 Women's South American champions

Brazil
21st title

14–woman roster
Fabiana Claudino (c), Mara Leão, Macris Carneiro, Gabriela Candido, Amanda Francisco, Roberta Ratzke, Sheilla Castro, Ana Carolina da Silva, Suelen Pinto, Leia Silva, Ana Beatriz Correa, Drussyla Costa, Maira Claro, Lorenne Teixeira
Head coach
José Roberto Guimarães

== Awards ==
- Most valuable player
  (Brazil) Lorenne Teixeira
- Best setter
  (Colombia) María Marín
- Best outside spikers
  (Colombia) Amanda Coneo
  (Peru) Karla Ortiz
- Best middle blockers
  (Brazil) Mara Leão
  (Brazil) Ana Beatriz Correa
- Best opposite spiker
  (Argentina) Sol Piccolo
- Best libero
  (Colombia) Juliana Toro

== See also ==
- South American Men's Volleyball Championship
- Women's U22 South American Volleyball Championship
- Women's Junior South American Volleyball Championship
- Girls' Youth South American Volleyball Championship
- Girls' U16 South American Volleyball Championship
- Volleyball at the Pan American Games
- Women's Pan-American Volleyball Cup
