= 2017 Women's South American Volleyball Championship =

Tournament details
- Host country: Colombia
- Dates: August 15–19
- Teams: 6
- Venue: 1 (in Cali host cities)

Final positions
- Champions: Brazil (20th title)

Tournament awards
- MVP: Tandara Caixeta (BRA)

The 2017 Women's South American Volleyball Championship was the 32nd edition of the Women's South American Volleyball Championship held in Cali, Colombia and organised by South America's governing volleyball body, the Confederación Sudamericana de Voleibol (CSV). The champions will qualify for 2018 FIVB Volleyball Women's World Championship.

== Competing nations ==
The following national teams participated:

- Argentina
- Brazil
- Chile
- Colombia
- Peru
- Venezuela

== Round-Robin ==
Pos	Team	Pld	W	L	Pts	SW	SL	SR	SPW	SPL	SPR
1	Brazil	5	5	0	15	15	0	MAX	375	216	1.736
2	Colombia	5	4	1	11	12	5	2.400	396	336	1.179
3	Peru	5	3	2	9	9	6	1.500	339	310	1.094
4	Argentina	5	2	3	7	8	9	0.889	361	370	0.976
5	Venezuela	5	1	4	3	3	12	0.250	280	353	0.793
6	Chile	5	0	5	0	0	15	0.000	209	375	0.557

Date	Time		Score		Set 1	Set 2	Set 3	Set 4	Set 5	Total	Report
15 Aug	15:00	Chile	0–3	Venezuela	19–25	18–25	16–25			53–75	Report
15 Aug	17:00	Brazil	3–0	Argentina	25–21	25–15	25–15			75–51	Report
15 Aug	19:30	Peru	0–3	Colombia	20–25	23–25	20–25			63–75	Report
16 Aug	15:00	Venezuela	0–3	Brazil	15–25	6–25	12–25			33–75	Report
16 Aug	17:00	Argentina	0–3	Peru	19–25	19–25	20–25			58–75	Report
16 Aug	19:30	Colombia	3–0	Chile	25–12	25–17	25–12			75–41	Report
17 Aug	15:00	Peru	3–0	Venezuela	25–15	25–21	25–21			75–57	Report
17 Aug	17:00	Brazil	3–0	Chile	25–5	25–10	25–7			75–22	Report
17 Aug	19:30	Colombia	3–2	Argentina	26–24	24–26	25–17	22–25	15–10	112–102	Report
18 Aug	15:00	Chile	0–3	Argentina	16–25	16–25	16–25			48–75	Report
18 Aug	17:00	Brazil	3–0	Peru	25–16	25–17	25–18			75–51	Report
18 Aug	19:30	Venezuela	0–3	Colombia	18–25	18–25	19–25			55–75	Report
19 Aug	12:30	Argentina	3–0	Venezuela	25–19	25–18	25–23			75–60	Report
19 Aug	14:30	Peru	3–0	Chile	25–9	25–18	25–18			75–45	Report
19 Aug	16:30	Colombia	0–3	Brazil	23–25	19–25	17–25			59–75	Report

== Final standing ==
Rank	Team
1st place, gold medalist(s)	Brazil
2nd place, silver medalist(s)	Colombia
3rd place, bronze medalist(s)	Peru
4	Argentina
5	Venezuela
6	Chile

Qualified for the 2018 World Championship

2017 South American Championship

Brazil
20th title

13–woman roster
Natália Pereira (c), Mara Leão, Macris Carneiro, Ana Carolina da Silva, Adenízia da Silva, Tandara Caixeta, Rosamaria Montibeller, Amanda Francisco, Suelen Pinto, Gabriella Souza, Roberta Ratzke, Drussyla Costa, Monique Pavão
Head coach
José Roberto Guimarães

== Awards ==
- Most valuable player
  (Brazil) Tandara Caixeta
- Best setter
  (Colombia) María Marín
- Best outside spikers
  (Peru) Ángela Leyva
  (Brazil) Natália Pereira
- Best middle blockers
  (Argentina) Julieta Lazcano
  (Brazil) Ana Carolina da Silva
- Best opposite spiker
  (Colombia) Dayana Segovia
- Best libero
  (Colombia) Camila Gómez

== See also ==
- South American Men's Volleyball Championship
- Women's U22 South American Volleyball Championship
- Women's Junior South American Volleyball Championship
- Girls' Youth South American Volleyball Championship
- Girls' U16 South American Volleyball Championship
- Volleyball at the Pan American Games
- Women's Pan-American Volleyball Cup
