= Leites Nestlé =

Volleyball club

- Full name: Leites Nestlé
- Nickname: Leite Moça
- Founded: 1993
- Dissolved: 1999
- Ground: Ginásio de Esportes Dr. Nicolino de Lucca, Jundiaí, SP (Capacity: 12,000)
- Manager: (Brazil) Sérgio Negrão
- League: (Brazil) Superliga Brasileira de Voleibol
- 1998-99: 3rd

Uniforms
Home	Away

Leites Nestlé or Leite Moça was a Brazilian women's volleyball club representing Sorocaba and Jundiaí, SP, winner of the 1994 FIVB Volleyball Women's Club World Championship. The team played the home games at the Ginásio de Esportes Dr. Nicolino de Lucca, in Jundiaí, SP.

== Names Evolution ==
- 1994-95 - 1996-97: Leite Moça/Sorocaba
- 1996-97 - 1998-99: Leites Nestlé/Jundiaí

== History ==
The team was found over the Clube Atlético Sorocaba in Sorocaba in 1993, with the sponsorship from the product Leite Moça from the Swiss company Nestlé; and transferred to Jundiaí in 1996. Three years later the team folded.

=== 1994-95 ===
Leite Moça participated at the third edition of the FIVB Volleyball Women's Club World Championship in 1994, held in São Paulo, Brazil; winning the gold medal. In that tournament Ana Moser was the MVP and Best Server and Fernanda Venturini was Best Setter.

At the first season of the Superliga Brasileira de Voleibol, after being renamed from Liga Nacional, Leite Moça win the championship under the guidance of the head coach Sérgio Negrão and players like Ana Paula and Fernanda Venturini, who was the MVP of the tournament.

=== 1995-96 ===
The next season, once again Venturini led Leite Moça to the championship, defeating BCN/Osasco 3-0 in the final series. The team also won the 1995 Paulista Championship.

=== 1996-97 ===
In 1996 the team moved to Jundiaí and was renamed Leites Nestlé, always under the Swiss sponsor, conquering the third Brazilian Superliga title in a row.

The team won the South American Club Championship in 1997. conquering the third Brazilian Superliga title in a row.

=== 1997-98 ===
After three consecutive gold medals, the team ended the season with the second place of the Superliga after losing from Rexona and won the 1998 South American Club Championship.

=== 1998-1999 ===
What it would be the last season for Leites Nestlé, after finishing in 6th place in the regular season, the team could qualify to the semifinals, being defeated again by Rexona, but winning the third place match to Universidade de Guarulhos

== Palmares ==
=== World Championship ===
- Champion: 1994

=== South American Championship ===
- Champion: 1997, 1998

=== Brazilian Superliga ===
- Champion: 1994-95, 1995–96, 1996–97
- Runner-Up: 1997-98
- 3rd Place; 1998–99
