= Andréia Laurence =

Brazilian volleyball player (born 1983)

Andreia Sforzin

Personal information
- Full name: Andréia Sforzin
- Born: 26 April 1983 (age 43); São Paulo, Brazil
- Height: 1.83 m (6 ft 0 in)
- Weight: 76 kg (168 lb)
- Spike: 298 cm (117 in)
- Block: 288 cm (113 in)

Volleyball information
- Position: Opposite spiker

National team
2014	Brazil

Andreia Sforzin (born 26 April 1983) is a Brazilian female volleyball player.

With her club Rexona Ades, she competed at the 2015 FIVB Volleyball Women's Club World Championship.

== Clubs ==
- (Brazil) São Caetano (2001–2004)
- (Brazil) E.C. Pinheiros (2004–2006)
- (South Korea) GS Caltex (2006–2007)
- (Brazil) Osasco (2007–2008)
- (Brazil) São Caetano (2008–2009)
- (Brazil) Osasco (2009–2010)
- (Brazil) E.C. Pinheiros (2010–2014)
- (Brazil) Rio de Janeiro (2014–2015)
- (Brazil) SESI-São Paulo (2015–2016)
- (Brazil) Brasília Vôlei (2016–2017)
- (Brazil) Praia Clube (2017–2018)

== Awards ==
=== Clubs ===
- 2009–10 Brazilian Superliga – Champion, with Sollys Osasco
- 2014–15 Brazilian Superliga – Champion, with Rexona-Ades
- 2017–18 Brazilian Superliga – Champion, with Praia Clube
- 2010 South American Club Championship – Champion, with Sollys Osasco
- 2015 South American Club Championship – Champion, with Rexona-Ades
