= 2013 Women's South American Volleyball Club Championship =

Tournament details
- Host country: Peru
- Dates: 1 – 5 May 2013
- Teams: 5
- Venue: 1 (in Lima host cities)

Final positions
- Champions: (Brazil) Unilever (1st title)

Tournament awards
- MVP: (Brazil) Natália Pereira (Unilever)

The 2013 Women's South American Volleyball Club Championship was the fifth official edition of the women's volleyball tournament, played by five teams from 1 – 5 May 2013 in Miraflores, Lima, Peru. Unilever qualified to the 2013 FIVB Women's Club World Championship.

== Competing clubs ==
Clubs

(Argentina) Vélez Sársfield
(Brazil) Unilever
(Chile) Boston College
(Paraguay) Universidad Metropolitana
(Peru) Universidad César Vallejo

== Round robin ==
The competition system for the tournament was a single round robin system. Each team plays once against each of the four remaining teams. Points are accumulated during the whole tournament, and the final ranking is determined by the total points gained.

=== Results ===
Pos	Team	Pld	W	L	Pts	SW	SL	SR	SPW	SPL	SPR
1	(Brazil) Unilever	4	4	0	12	12	1	12.000	323	175	1.846
2	(Peru) Universidad César Vallejo	4	3	1	9	9	4	2.250	302	252	1.198
3	(Chile) Boston College	4	2	2	5	7	8	0.875	318	321	0.991
4	(Argentina) Vélez Sársfield	4	1	3	4	6	9	0.667	318	321	0.991
5	(Paraguay) Universidad Metropolitana	4	0	4	0	0	12	0.000	110	300	0.367

Date		Score		Set 1	Set 2	Set 3	Set 4	Set 5	Total
1 May	Vélez Sársfield (Argentina)	3–0	(Paraguay) Universidad Metropolitana	25–11	25–11	25–13			75–35
1 May	Universidad César Vallejo (Peru)	3–1	(Chile) Boston College	25–27	25–22	26–24	25–14		101–87
2 May	Unilever (Brazil)	3–0	(Chile) Boston College	25–10	25–20	25–13			75–43
2 May	Universidad César Vallejo (Peru)	3–0	(Paraguay) Universidad Metropolitana	25–10	25–7	25–7			75–24
3 May	Unilever (Brazil)	3–0	(Paraguay) Universidad Metropolitana	25–9	25–5	25–3			75–17
3 May	Universidad César Vallejo (Peru)	3–0	(Argentina) Vélez Sársfield	25–22	25–22	25–22			75–66
4 May	Boston College (Chile)	3–0	(Paraguay) Universidad Metropolitana	25–17	25–6	25–11			75–34
4 May	Vélez Sársfield (Argentina)	1–3	(Brazil) Unilever	11–25	12–25	25–23	16–25		64–98
5 May	Vélez Sársfield (Argentina)	2–3	(Chile) Boston College	23–25	23–25	27–25	25–23	13–15	111–113
5 May	Universidad César Vallejo (Peru)	0–3	(Brazil) Unilever	12–25	23–25	16–25			51–75

== Final standing ==
Rank	Team
1st place, gold medalist(s)	(Brazil) Unilever
2nd place, silver medalist(s)	(Peru) Universidad César Vallejo
3rd place, bronze medalist(s)	(Chile) Boston College
4	(Argentina) Vélez Sársfield
5	(Paraguay) Universidad Metropolitana

Qualified for the 2013 FIVB Women's Club World Championship

2013 Women's South American Volleyball Club Champions

1st title

Team Roster:
Gabi, Mara, Bruna, Regis, Juciely, Fofão(C), Roberta, Valeskinha, Natalia, Fabi(L), Luciane, Juju

Head Coach: Bernardinho

== Individual awards ==
- MVP: (Brazil) Natália Pereira (Unilever)
- Best spiker: (Brazil) Gabriela Guimarães (Unilever)
- Best blocker: (Brazil) Bruna Silva (Unilever)
- Best server: (Peru) Milagros Moy (U. César Vallejo)
- Best setter: (Brazil) Hélia Souza (Unilever)
- Best digger: (Brazil) Fabiana de Oliveira (Unilever)
- Best receiver: (Peru) Mirian Patiño (U. César Vallejo)
- Best libero: (Brazil) Fabiana de Oliveira (Unilever)
