= 2018 Women's South American Volleyball Club Championship =

Tournament details
- Host country: Brazil
- Dates: 20–24 February 2018
- Teams: 6
- Venue: 1 (in Belo Horizonte host cities)

Final positions
- Champions: (Brazil) Camponesa/Minas (1st title)

Tournament awards
- MVP: (Brazil) Carol Gattaz (Camponesa/Minas)

The 2018 Women's South American Volleyball Club Championship was the tenth official edition of the women's volleyball tournament, played by six teams from 20 to 24 February 2018 in Belo Horizonte, Brazil. Camponesa/Minas won its first title and qualified for the 2018 FIVB Volleyball Women's Club World Championship in Ningbo, China. Carol Gattaz was elected the Most Valuable Player.

== Competing clubs ==
Teams were seeded in two pools of three according to how the representatives of their countries finished in the 2016 edition.

| Pool A | Pool B |
|---|---|
| (Brazil) Camponesa/Minas (Peru) Regatas Lima (Argentina) Boca Juniors | (Brazil) Rexona-Sesc (Argentina) Gimnasia y Esgrima (LP) (Bolivia) Universitario San Simón |

== Preliminary round ==
=== Pool A ===
| Pos | Team | Pld | W | L | Pts | SW | SL | SR | SPW | SPL | SPR | Qualification |
|---|---|---|---|---|---|---|---|---|---|---|---|---|
| 1 | (Brazil) Camponesa/Minas | 2 | 2 | 0 | 6 | 6 | 0 | MAX | 150 | 84 | 1.786 | Semifinals |
| 2 | (Peru) Regatas Lima | 2 | 1 | 1 | 3 | 3 | 4 | 0.750 | 143 | 162 | 0.883 | Semifinals |
| 3 | (Argentina) Boca Juniors | 2 | 0 | 2 | 0 | 1 | 6 | 0.167 | 122 | 169 | 0.722 | |

| Date | | Score | | Set 1 | Set 2 | Set 3 | Set 4 | Set 5 | Total |
|---|---|---|---|---|---|---|---|---|---|
| 20 Feb | Camponesa/Minas (Brazil) | 3–0 | (Peru) Regatas Lima | 25–22 | 25–13 | 25–14 | | | 75–49 |
| 21 Feb | Camponesa/Minas (Brazil) | 3–0 | (Argentina) Boca Juniors | 25–7 | 25–16 | 25–12 | | | 75–35 |
| 22 Feb | Regatas Lima (Peru) | 3–1 | (Argentina) Boca Juniors | 25–23 | 25–18 | 19–25 | 25-21 | | 94–87 |

=== Pool B ===
| Pos | Team | Pld | W | L | Pts | SW | SL | SR | SPW | SPL | SPR | Qualification |
|---|---|---|---|---|---|---|---|---|---|---|---|---|
| 1 | (Brazil) Rexona-Sesc | 2 | 2 | 0 | 6 | 6 | 0 | MAX | 150 | 77 | 1.948 | Semifinals |
| 2 | (Argentina) GELP | 2 | 1 | 1 | 3 | 3 | 3 | 1.000 | 120 | 114 | 1.053 | Semifinals |
| 3 | (Bolivia) Universitario San Simón | 2 | 0 | 2 | 0 | 0 | 6 | 0.000 | 71 | 150 | 0.473 | |

| Date | | Score | | Set 1 | Set 2 | Set 3 | Set 4 | Set 5 | Total |
|---|---|---|---|---|---|---|---|---|---|
| 20 Feb | Gimnasia y Esgrima (LP) (Argentina) | 3–0 | (Bolivia) Universitario San Simón | 25–11 | 25–12 | 25–16 | | | 75–39 |
| 21 Feb | Rexona-Sesc (Brazil) | 3–0 | (Argentina) Gimnasia y Esgrima (LP) | 25–13 | 25–15 | 25–17 | | | 75–45 |
| 22 Feb | Rexona-Sesc (Brazil) | 3–0 | (Bolivia) Universitario San Simón | 25–6 | 25–14 | 25–12 | | | 75–32 |

== Final round ==
=== Bracket ===
Semifinals
23 February
(Brazil) Camponesa/Minas | 3
(Argentina) Gimnasia y Esgrima (LP) | 0
23 February
(Brazil) Rexona-Sesc | 3
(Peru) Regatas Lima | 0

Final
24 February
(Brazil) Camponesa/Minas | 3
(Brazil) Rexona-Sesc | 2
3rd place
24 February
(Argentina) Gimnasia y Esgrima (LP) | 0
(Peru) Regatas Lima | 3

=== Fifth place match ===
| Date | | Score | | Set 1 | Set 2 | Set 3 | Set 4 | Set 5 | Total |
|---|---|---|---|---|---|---|---|---|---|
| 23 Feb | Boca Juniors (Argentina) | 3–0 | Universitario San Simón (Bolivia) | 25–10 | 25–11 | 25-17 | | | 75–38 |

=== Semifinals ===
| Date | | Score | | Set 1 | Set 2 | Set 3 | Set 4 | Set 5 | Total |
|---|---|---|---|---|---|---|---|---|---|
| 23 Feb | Camponesa/Minas (Brazil) | 3–0 | (Argentina) Gimnasia y Esgrima (LP) | 25–14 | 25–13 | 25–11 | | | 75–38 |
| 23 Feb | Rexona-Sesc (Brazil) | 3–0 | (Peru) Regatas Lima | 25–13 | 25–8 | 25–9 | | | 75–30 |

=== Third place match ===
| Date | | Score | | Set 1 | Set 2 | Set 3 | Set 4 | Set 5 | Total |
|---|---|---|---|---|---|---|---|---|---|
| 24 Feb | Gimnasia y Esgrima (LP) (Argentina) | 0–3 | (Peru) Regatas Lima | 19–25 | 15–25 | 15–25 | | | 49–75 |

=== Final ===
| Date | | Score | | Set 1 | Set 2 | Set 3 | Set 4 | Set 5 | Total |
|---|---|---|---|---|---|---|---|---|---|
| 24 Feb | Camponesa/Minas (Brazil) | 3–2 | (Brazil) Rexona-Sesc | 25–23 | 22–25 | 25–23 | 15–25 | 15–9 | 102–105 |

== Final standing ==
| Rank | Team |
|---|---|
| 1st place, gold medalist(s) | (Brazil) Camponesa/Minas |
| 2nd place, silver medalist(s) | (Brazil) Rexona-Sesc |
| 3rd place, bronze medalist(s) | (Peru) Regatas Lima |
| 4 | (Argentina) Gimnasia y Esgrima (LP) |
| 5 | (Argentina) Boca Juniors |
| 6 | (Bolivia) Universitario San Simón |

| Qualified for the 2018 FIVB Volleyball Women's Club World Championship |

2018 Women's South American Volleyball Club Champions

1st title

14–woman Roster
Mara Leão, Caroline Gattaz (c), Macris Carneiro, Laiza Ferreira, Karine Guerra, Priscila Daroit, Rosamaria Montibeller, Sonja Newcombe, Natália Monteiro, Destinee Hooker, Georgia Cattani, Karoline Tormena, Mayany de Souza, Leia Silva

== All-Star team ==
- Most valuable player
  - (Brazil) Carol Gattaz (Camponesa/Minas)
- Best Opposite
  - (United States) Holly Toliver (Regatas Lima)
- Best Outside Hitters
  - (Brazil) Rosamaria Montibeller (Camponesa/Minas)
  - (Brazil) Drussyla Costa (Rexona-Sesc)
- Best setter
  - (Brazil) Macris Carneiro (Camponesa/Minas)
- Best Middle Blockers
  - (Brazil) Juciely Cristina Barreto (Rexona-Sesc)
  - (Brazil) Mayhara Silva (Rexona-Sesc)
- Best libero
  - (Brazil) Léia Silva (Camponesa/Minas)

== See also ==
- 2018 Men's South American Volleyball Club Championship
