= Rio de Janeiro Vôlei Clube =

Women's volleyball team

SESC-RJ/Flamengo
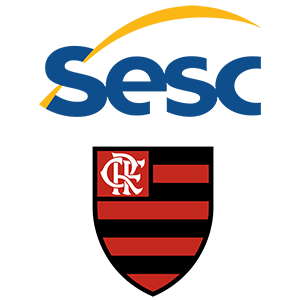
- Full name: Rio de Janeiro Vôlei Clube
- Founded: March 1997 (as Paraná VC) and March 2003 (as Rio de Janeiro VC)
- Ground: Ginásio Tijuca Tênis Clube (Capacity: 4000)
- Manager: (Brazil) Bernardo Rezende
- League: Brazilian Superliga
- Website: Club home page

Rio de Janeiro Vôlei Clube is a Brazilian women's volleyball club based in the city of Rio de Janeiro. The team competes in the Brazilian Women's Superliga and has won the competition several times while playing under different brand names, including Rexona/AdeS, Unilever, and Rexona–SESC. From the 2017–18 season it adopted the name SESC-RJ, and since 2020–21 the team has competed as SESC-RJ/Flamengo following a partnership with Flamengo and Sesc.

Although they are distinct legal entities, the Brazilian Volleyball Confederation regards Rio de Janeiro as the sporting heir to Paraná Vôlei Clube, combining the titles won by both clubs under the same brand names.

== History ==
It was founded in 1997 as Paraná Vôlei Clube of Curitiba and moved to Rio in 2003. The current Rio de Janeiro entity was formed in 2003 and formalized in 2004. Paraná had already competed as a guest in the Rio de Janeiro state championship and had won two Superliga titles. Looking to expand its social sports programs in Rio, sponsor Unilever - which branded the team with its Rexona deodorant and AdeS soy drink - relocated the team to the state capital.

In 2004, with the renewed Rexona–Unilever partnership and the return of coach Bernardo Rezende and setter Fernanda Venturini, Rexona/AdeS won the Salonpas Cup (3–0 vs. Osasco) and captured the Rio de Janeiro state title undefeated. In 2004–05 the team went unbeaten in the regular season but lost the Superliga finals to Osasco (0–3). It then won consecutive Superliga titles in 2005–06 and 2006–07; in 2007 the club completed a Salonpas Cup three-peat and claimed the Copa do Brasil.

In 2007–08 and 2008–09, the team secured two further Superliga crowns (both vs. Osasco), becoming the competition’s first five-time champion. From 2009–10 the team competed under the Unilever brand, continuing to reach Superliga finals and winning additional national titles, including 2010–11, 2012–13 and 2013–14. Also, won the silver medal at the 2013 Club World Championship after falling 3-0 to Vakıfbank Istanbul.

As Rexona/AdeS in 2014–15, the club earned a third straight Superliga (tenth overall); The team placed fourth at the 2015 Club World Championship. In 2015–16, Rexona/AdeS added an eleventh Superliga title (3–1 vs. Praia Clube). In 2016-2017, the club won the Copa do Brasil, the South American Club Championship and the Superliga, then finished runners-up to VakıfBank at the 2017 Club World Championship.

As SESC-RJ from 2017–18, results were more modest, but the team remained competitive; in 2019–20 it won the Rio de Janeiro state title and the Copa Brasil, while the Superliga playoffs were canceled due to the COVID-19 pandemic. Since 2020–21 the team has competed as SESC-RJ/Flamengo.

== Names evolution ==
- Rexona (as Paraná Vôlei Clube) (1997-2002)
- Rexona/Ades (2003-2009)
- Unilever Vôlei (2010-2013)
- Rexona/Ades (2014–2016)
- Rexona Sesc-RJ (2016-2017)
- Sesc RJ Vôlei (2017-2020)
- Sesc RJ/Flamengo (2020-present)

== Team ==
Women's team of Sesc-RJ/Flamengo for the 2025–26 season.

- Head coach: (Brazil) Bernardo Rezende

Current Squad
No.	Player	Nat.	Position	Height	Date of birth
1	Vivian Lima	(Brazil)	Setter	1.82 m	14 Oct 1999
5	Clara Rodrigues	(Brazil)	Setter	1.71 m	24 Mar 2005
20	Giovana Gasparini	(Brazil)	Setter	1.75 m	5 Jul 1994
10	Tainara Santos	(Brazil)	Opposite	1.87 m	9 Mar 2000
12	Camila Mesquita	(Brazil)	Opposite	1.82 m	27 Feb 2000
Nr.	Vittoria Kuehne	(Brazil)	Outside hitter	1.84 m	20 Jul 2006
8	Mikaela Hestmann	(Brazil)	Outside hitter	1.81 m	11 Oct 2007
11	Karina Souza	(Brazil)	Outside hitter	1.78 m	30 Nov 1998
15	Helena Wenk	(Brazil)	Outside hitter	2.00 m	11 Feb 2005
21	Simone Lee-Wank	(United States)	Outside hitter	1.88 m	7 Oct 1996
3	Adria Silva	(Brazil)	Middle blocker	1.83 m	11 Aug 2004
4	Julliana Gandra	(Brazil)	Middle blocker	1.92 m	1 Mar 2004
7	Lorena Viezel	(Brazil)	Middle blocker	1.90 m	21 Jul 1999
14	Maša Kirov	(Serbia)	Middle blocker	1.89 m	16 Aug 2005
2	Victoria Stadler	(Brazil)	Libero	1.66 m	15 Apr 2004
22	Laís Vasques	(Brazil)	Libero	1.72 m	12 Feb 1996

== Previous seasons ==
Team roster - season 2019–2020
Number	Player	Position	Height (m)	Birth date
1	(Brazil) Milka Silva	Middle Blocker	1.90	July 18, 1994 (age 31)
2	(Brazil) Natália Araujo	Libero	1.65	April 10, 1997 (age 28)
3	(Brazil) Renata Colombo	Opposite	1.82	February 25, 1981 (age 44)
4	(Brazil) Natiele Gonçalves	Opposite	1.80	November 28, 1991 (age 34)
6	(Brazil) Juciely Barreto	Middle blocker	1.84	December 18, 1980 (age 45)
7	(Brazil) Carolina Leite	Setter	1.72	November 15, 1992 (age 33)
8	(Brazil) Ariele Moreira	Outside Hitter	1.85	November 18, 1995 (age 30)
10	(Dominican Republic) Yonkaira Peña	Outside hitter	1.90	May 10, 1993 (age 32)
11	(Brazil) Lara Filomeno	Middle Blocker	1.88	February 11, 1989 (age 36)
12	(Brazil) Gabriella Souza	Libero	1.70	December 14, 1993 (age 32)
13	(Brazil) Amanda Francisco (c)	Outside hitter	1.80	October 16, 1988 (age 37)
14	(Brazil) Fabiola de Souza	Setter	1.84	February 3, 1983 (age 42)
16	(Brazil) Tandara Caixeta	Opposite	1.84	October 30, 1988 (age 37)
17	(Brazil) Drussyla Costa	Outside hitter	1.82	July 1, 1996 (age 29)
19	(Brazil) Linda Costa	Middle Blocker	1.88	September 2, 1994 (age 31)
20	(Brazil) Thaís Oliveira	Setter	1.80	April 1, 1996 (age 29)

Team roster - season 2018–2019
Number	Player	Position	Height (m)	Birth date
2	(Brazil) Mayhara Silva	Middle blocker	1.84	April 9, 1989 (age 36)
4	(Brazil) Natiele Gonçalves	Opposite	1.80	November 28, 1991 (age 34)
5	(Russia) Tatiana Kosheleva	Outside hitter	1.91	December 23, 1988 (age 37)
6	(Brazil) Juciely Barreto	Middle blocker	1.84	December 18, 1980 (age 45)
7	(Brazil) Carolina Leite	Setter	1.72	November 15, 1992 (age 33)
9	(Brazil) Vitoria Figueiredo	Libero	1.65	May 29, 1995 (age 30)
11	(Brazil) Gabriella Souza	Libero	1.70	December 14, 1993 (age 32)
12	(Brazil) Roberta Ratzke	Setter	1.85	April 28, 1990 (age 35)
13	(Brazil) Kasiely Clemente	Outside hitter	1.82	December 6, 1993 (age 32)
15	(Brazil) Monique Pavão	Opposite	1.78	October 31, 1986 (age 39)
16	(Dominican Republic) Yonkaira Peña	Outside hitter	1.90	May 10, 1993 (age 32)
17	(Brazil) Drussyla Costa	Outside hitter	1.82	July 1, 1996 (age 29)
18	(Brazil) Mikaella da Silva	Setter	1.75	June 14, 1997 (age 28)
19	(Brazil) Linda Costa	Middle Blocker	1.88	September 2, 1994 (age 31)
20	(Brazil) Ana Beatriz Correa	Middle Blocker	1.88	February 7, 1992 (age 33)

Team roster - season 2017–2018
Number	Player	Position	Height (m)	Birth date
1	(Brazil) Gabriela Guimarães	Outside hitter	1.80	May 19, 1994 (age 31)
2	(Brazil) Mayhara Silva	Middle blocker	1.84	April 9, 1989 (age 36)
3	(Brazil) Natiele Gonçalves	Opposite	1.80	November 28, 1991 (age 34)
5	(Brazil) Carolina Leite	Setter	1.72	November 15, 1992 (age 33)
6	(Brazil) Juciely Barreto	Middle blocker	1.84	December 18, 1980 (age 45)
7	(Brazil) Vivian Pelegrino	Middle Blocker	1.80	May 31, 1985 (age 40)
9	(Brazil) Vitoria Figueiredo	Libero	1.65	May 29, 1995 (age 30)
11	(Brazil) Gabriella Souza	Outside hitter	1.70	December 14, 1993 (age 32)
12	(Brazil) Roberta Ratzke	Setter	1.85	April 28, 1990 (age 35)
13	(Brazil) Kasiely Clemente	Outside hitter	1.82	December 6, 1993 (age 32)
14	(Brazil) Fabiana de Oliveira	Libero	1.69	March 7, 1980 (age 45)
15	(Brazil) Monique Pavão	Opposite	1.78	October 31, 1986 (age 39)
16	(Dominican Republic) Yonkaira Peña	Outside hitter	1.90	May 10, 1993 (age 32)
17	(Brazil) Drussyla Costa	Outside hitter	1.82	July 1, 1996 (age 29)
18	(Brazil) Mikaella da Silva	Setter	1.75	June 14, 1997 (age 28)
19	(Brazil) Linda Costa	Middle Blocker	1.88	September 2, 1994 (age 31)

Team roster - season 2016–2017
Number	Player	Position	Height (m)	Birth date
1	(Brazil) Gabriela Guimarães	Outside hitter	1.80	May 19, 1994 (age 31)
2	(Brazil) Mayhara Silva	Middle blocker	1.84	April 9, 1989 (age 36)
5	(Brazil) Regiane Bidias	Outside hitter	1.90	October 2, 1986 (age 39)
6	(Brazil) Juciely Barreto	Middle blocker	1.84	December 18, 1980 (age 45)
7	(Brazil) Camilla Barreto	Setter	1.70	June 20, 1984 (age 41)
9	(Brazil) Vitoria Figueiredo	Libero	1.65	May 29, 1995 (age 30)
10	(Brazil) Monique Pavão	Opposite	1.78	October 31, 1986 (age 39)
11	(Netherlands) Anne Buijs	Outside hitter	1.91	December 2, 1991 (age 34)
12	(Brazil) Roberta Ratzke	Setter	1.85	April 28, 1990 (age 35)
13	(Brazil) Heloiza Pereira	Opposite	1.87	November 2, 1990 (age 35)
14	(Brazil) Fabiana de Oliveira	Libero	1.69	March 7, 1980 (age 45)
15	(Brazil) Ana da Silva	Middle blocker	1.83	April 8, 1991 (age 34)
16	(Brazil) Stephanie Apolinario	Middle blocker	1.88	July 15, 1994 (age 31)
17	(Brazil) Drussyla Costa	Outside hitter	1.85	July 1, 1996 (age 29)
18	(Brazil) Mikaella da Silva	Setter	1.75	June 14, 1997 (age 28)

Team roster - season 2015–2016
Number	Player	Position	Height (m)	Birth date
1	(Brazil) Gabriela Guimarães	Outside Hitter	1.80	May 19, 1994 (age 31)
2	(Brazil) Mayhara Silva	Middle Blocker	1.85	April 9, 1989 (age 36)
3	(United States) Courtney Thompson	Setter	1.73	November 4, 1984 (age 41)
5	(Brazil) Regiane Bidias	Outside Hitter	1.91	October 2, 1986 (age 39)
6	(Brazil) Juciely Silva	Middle Blocker	1.84	December 18, 1980 (age 45)
9	(Brazil) Roberta Ratzke	Setter	1.85	April 28, 1990 (age 35)
11	(Brazil) Lorenne Teixeira	Opposite	1.87	January 8, 1996 (age 30)
12	(Brazil) Natália Pereira	Outside Hitter	1.86	April 4, 1989 (age 36)
13	(Brazil) Monique Pavão	Opposite	1.78	October 31, 1986 (age 39)
14	(Brazil) Fabiana de Oliveira	Libero	1.69	March 7, 1980 (age 45)
15	(Brazil) Ana Carolina da Silva	Middle Blocker	1.83	April 8, 1991 (age 34)
16	(Brazil) Paula Barros	Middle Blocker	1.87	March 20, 1982 (age 43)
17	(Brazil) Drussyla Costa	Outside Hitter	1.86	July 1, 1996 (age 29)
20	(Brazil) Juliana Perdigão	Libero	1.61	April 5, 1991 (age 34)

Team roster - season 2014–2015
Number	Player	Position	Height (m)	Birth date
1	(Brazil) Gabriela Guimarães	Outside Hitter	1.80	May 19, 1994 (age 31)
2	(Brazil) Mayhara Silva	Middle Blocker	1.85	April 9, 1989 (age 36)
3	(Brazil) Bruna da Silva	Opposite	1.81	July 3, 1989 (age 36)
4	(Brazil) Giovana Gasparini	Setter	1.74	July 5, 1994 (age 31)
5	(Brazil) Regiane Bidias	Outside Hitter	1.91	October 2, 1986 (age 39)
6	(Brazil) Juciely Silva	Middle Blocker	1.84	December 18, 1980 (age 45)
7	(Brazil) Hélia Souza	Setter	1.73	March 10, 1970 (age 55)
8	(Brazil) Amanda Francisco	Outside Hitter	1.80	August 16, 1988 (age 37)
9	(Brazil) Roberta Ratzke	Setter	1.85	April 28, 1990 (age 35)
10	(Brazil) Andréia Laurence	Opposite	1.86	April 26, 1983 (age 42)
12	(Brazil) Natália Pereira	Outside Hitter	1.86	April 4, 1989 (age 36)
13	(Brazil) Paula Barros	Middle Blocker	1.87	March 20, 1982 (age 43)
14	(Brazil) Fabiana de Oliveira	Libero	1.69	March 7, 1980 (age 45)
15	(Brazil) Ana Carolina da Silva	Middle Blocker	1.83	April 8, 1991 (age 34)
17	(Brazil) Drussyla Costa	Outside Hitter	1.86	July 1, 1996 (age 29)
20	(Brazil) Juliana Perdigão	Libero	1.61	April 5, 1991 (age 34)

Team roster - season 2013–2014
Number	Player	Position	Height (m)	Birth date
1	(Brazil) Gabriela Guimarães	Outside Hitter	1.80	May 19, 1994 (age 31)
4	(Canada) Sarah Pavan	Opposite	1.96	August 16, 1986 (age 39)
5	(Brazil) Regiane Bidias	Outside Hitter	1.91	October 2, 1986 (age 39)
6	(Brazil) Juciely Silva	Middle Blocker	1.84	December 18, 1980 (age 45)
7	(Brazil) Hélia Souza	Setter	1.73	March 10, 1970 (age 55)
8	(Brazil) Amanda Francisco	Outside Hitter	1.80	August 16, 1988 (age 37)
9	(Brazil) Bruna da Silva	Opposite	1.81	July 3, 1989 (age 36)
10	(Brazil) Valeska Menezes	Middle Blocker	1.80	April 23, 1976 (age 49)
11	(Serbia) Brankica Mihajlović	Outside Hitter	1.91	April 13, 1991 (age 34)
12	(Brazil) Roberta Ratzke	Setter	1.85	April 28, 1990 (age 35)
14	(Brazil) Fabiana de Oliveira	Libero	1.69	March 7, 1980 (age 45)
15	(Brazil) Ana Carolina da Silva	Middle Blocker	1.83	April 8, 1991 (age 34)
16	(Brazil) Natasha Farinea	Middle Blocker	1.90	February 8, 1986 (age 39)
20	(Brazil) Juliana Perdigão	Libero	1.61	April 5, 1991 (age 34)

Team roster - season 2012–2013
Number	Player	Position	Height (m)	Birth date
1	(Brazil) Gabriela Guimarães	Outside Hitter	1.80	May 19, 1994 (age 31)
2	(Brazil) Mara Leão	Middle Blocker	1.88	July 26, 1991 (age 34)
3	(Brazil) Bruna da Silva	Opposite	1.81	July 3, 1989 (age 36)
4	(Canada) Sarah Pavan	Opposite	1.96	August 16, 1986 (age 39)
5	(Brazil) Regiane Bidias	Outside Hitter	1.91	October 2, 1986 (age 39)
6	(Brazil) Juciely Silva	Middle Blocker	1.84	December 18, 1980 (age 45)
7	(Brazil) Hélia Souza	Setter	1.73	March 10, 1970 (age 55)
8	(Brazil) Amanda Francisco	Outside Hitter	1.80	August 16, 1988 (age 37)
9	(Brazil) Roberta Ratzke	Setter	1.85	April 28, 1990 (age 35)
10	(Brazil) Valeska Menezes	Middle Blocker	1.80	April 23, 1976 (age 49)
12	(Brazil) Natália Pereira	Outside Hitter	1.86	April 4, 1989 (age 36)
14	(Brazil) Fabiana de Oliveira	Libero	1.69	March 7, 1980 (age 45)
15	(United States) Logan Tom	Outside Hitter	1.86	May 25, 1981 (age 44)
20	(Brazil) Juliana Perdigão	Libero	1.61	April 5, 1991 (age 34)

Team roster - season 2011–2012
Number	Player	Position	Height (m)	Birth date
1	(Brazil) Fernanda Venturini	Setter	1.80	October 24, 1970 (age 55)
2	(Brazil) Mara Leão	Middle Blocker	1.88	July 26, 1991 (age 34)
5	(Brazil) Regiane Bidias	Outside Hitter	1.91	October 2, 1986 (age 39)
6	(Brazil) Juciely Silva	Middle Blocker	1.84	December 18, 1980 (age 45)
7	(Brazil) Marianne Steinbrecher	Outside Hitter	1.88	August 23, 1983 (age 42)
8	(Brazil) Amanda Francisco	Outside Hitter	1.80	August 16, 1988 (age 37)
9	(Brazil) Roberta Ratzke	Setter	1.85	April 28, 1990 (age 35)
10	(Brazil) Valeska Menezes	Middle Blocker	1.80	April 23, 1976 (age 49)
11	(Brazil) Juliana Nogueira	Opposite	1.90	August 4, 1988 (age 37)
12	(Brazil) Natália Pereira	Outside Hitter	1.86	April 4, 1989 (age 36)
13	(Brazil) Sheilla Castro	Opposite	1.86	July 1, 1983 (age 42)
14	(Brazil) Fabiana de Oliveira	Libero	1.69	March 7, 1980 (age 45)
15	(Brazil) Ana Carolina da Silva	Middle Blocker	1.83	April 8, 1991 (age 34)

== Titles ==
- Brazilian Superliga:
  - (x12) 1997–98, 1999–00, 2005–06, 2006–07, 2007–08, 2008–09, 2010–11, 2012–13, 2013–14, 2014-15, 2015-16, 2016–17
  - (x5) 1998–99, 2004–05, 2009–10, 2011–12, 2017–18
- FIVB Club World Championship
  - (x2) 2013, 2017
- South American Club Championship
  - (x4) 2013, 2015, 2016, 2017
  - (x2) 2009, 2018
- Women's Top Volley International:
  - Winners (2): 2006, 2009
