= 2017 FIVB Volleyball Women's Club World Championship =

2017 Women's Club World Championship

Tournament details
- Host country: Japan
- City: Kobe
- Dates: 9–14 May
- Teams: 8 (from 3 confederations)
- Venue: 1 (in 1 host city)

Final positions
- Champions: (Turkey) Vakıfbank İstanbul (2nd title)
- Runners-up: (Brazil) Rexona-Sesc Rio
- Third place: (Switzerland) Voléro Zürich
- Fourth place: (Turkey) Eczacıbaşı VitrA

Tournament awards
- MVP: (China) Zhu Ting
- Best Setter: (Japan) Kaname Yamaguchi
- Best OH: (China) Zhu Ting (Brazil) Gabriela Guimarães
- Best MB: (Croatia) Maja Poljak (Turkey) Kübra Akman
- Best OPP: (Serbia) Tijana Bošković
- Best Libero: (Serbia) Silvija Popović

Tournament statistics
- Matches played: 20
- Attendance: 20,850 (1,043 per match)

The 2017 FIVB Women's Club World Championship was the 11th tournament. It was held for the first time at Kobe Green Arena in Kobe, Japan. Eight teams competed in the tournament, including four wild cards.

Vakıfbank İstanbul won their second world title, defeating Rio de Janeiro in the final, 3–0. Zhu Ting was elected the most valuable player.

== Qualification ==
Team	Qualified as
(Japan) Hisamitsu Springs	Hosts
(Japan) NEC Red Rockets	2016 Asian Champions
(Brazil) Rexona-Sesc Rio	2017 South American Champions
(Turkey) Vakıfbank İstanbul	2016–17 European Champions
(Brazil) Vôlei Nestlé Osasco	Wild Card
(Turkey) Eczacıbaşı VitrA	Wild Card
(Russia) Dinamo Moscow	Wild Card
(Switzerland) Voléro Zürich	Wild Card

== Pools composition ==
Pool A	Pool B
(Turkey) Vakıfbank İstanbul	(Turkey) Eczacıbaşı VitrA
(Russia) Dinamo Moscow	(Switzerland) Voléro Zürich
(Brazil) Rexona-Sesc Rio	(Brazil) Vôlei Nestlé Osasco
(Japan) Hisamitsu Springs	(Japan) NEC Red Rockets

== Venue ==
All rounds
Kobe, Japan
Kobe Green Arena
Capacity: 4,852
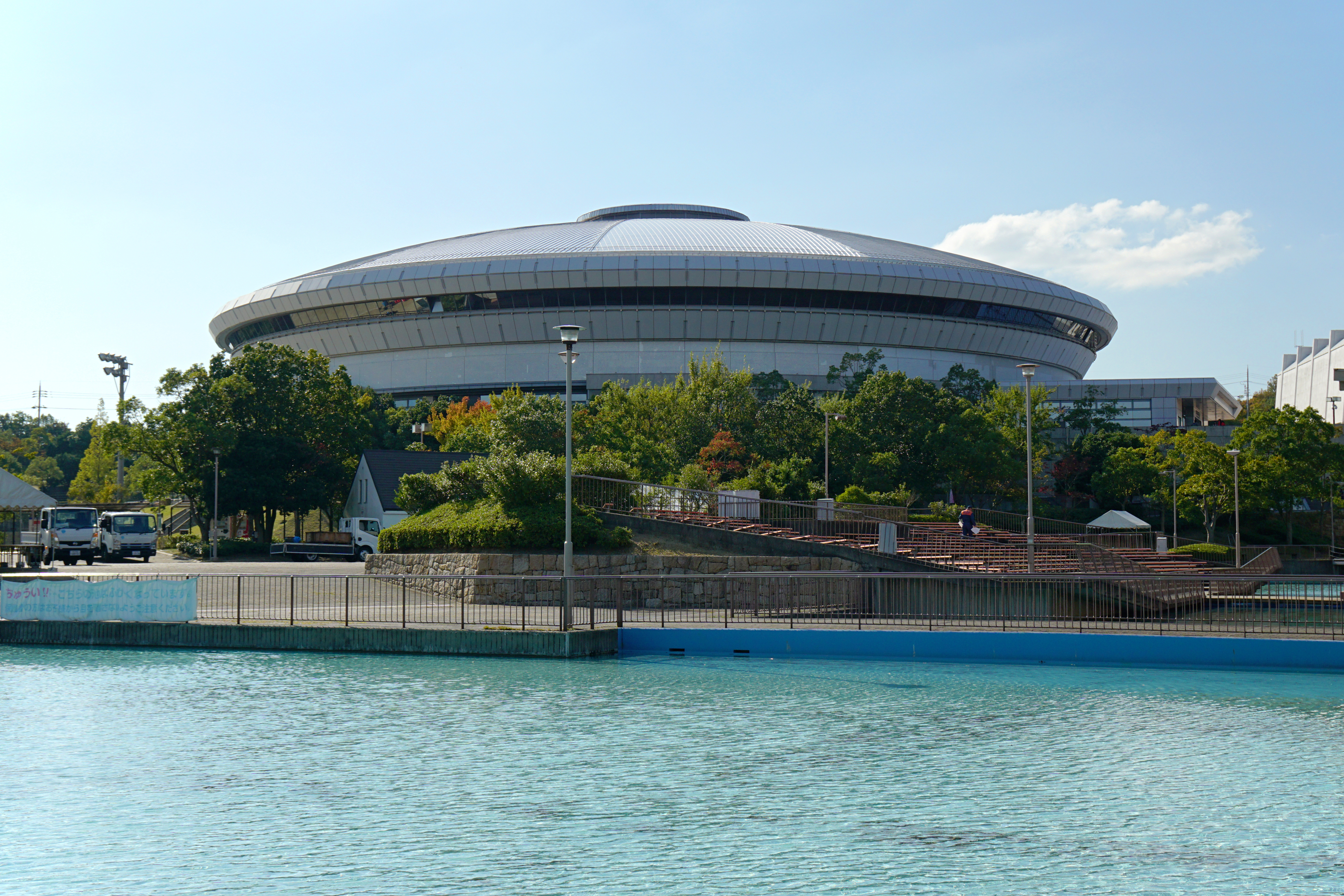

== Pool standing procedure ==
1. Number of matches won
2. Match points
3. Sets ratio
4. Points ratio
5. If the tie continues as per the point ratio between two teams, the priority will be given to the team which won the last match between them. When the tie in points ratio is between three or more teams, a new classification of these teams in the terms of points 1, 2 and 3 will be made taking into consideration only the matches in which they were opposed to each other.

Match won 3–0 or 3–1: 3 match points for the winner, 0 match points for the loser
Match won 3–2: 2 match points for the winner, 1 match point for the loser

== Preliminary round ==
- All times are Japan Standard Time (UTC+09:00).

=== Pool A ===
Pos	Team	Pld	W	L	Pts	SW	SL	SR	SPW	SPL	SPR	Qualification
1	(Turkey) Vakıfbank İstanbul	3	3	0	9	9	1	9.000	245	191	1.283	Semifinals
2	(Brazil) Rexona-Sesc Rio	3	2	1	6	7	5	1.400	267	267	1.000	Semifinals
3	(Russia) Dinamo Moscow	3	1	2	3	4	6	0.667	228	221	1.032	Classification 5th-8th
4	(Japan) Hisamitsu Springs	3	0	3	0	1	9	0.111	191	227	0.841	Classification 5th-8th

Date	Time		Score		Set 1	Set 2	Set 3	Set 4	Set 5	Total	Report
9 May	10:10	Dinamo Moscow (Russia)	0–3	(Turkey) Vakıfbank İstanbul	22–25	19–25	18–25			59–75	P2 P3
9 May	19:10	Hisamitsu Springs (Japan)	1–3	(Brazil) Rexona-Sesc Rio	16–25	25–22	16–25	21–25		78–97	P2 P3
10 May	12:55	Rexona-Sesc Rio (Brazil)	1–3	(Turkey) Vakıfbank İstanbul	17–25	15–25	25–20	15–25		72–95	P2 P3
10 May	19:10	Hisamitsu Springs (Japan)	0–3	(Russia) Dinamo Moscow	9–25	19–25	20–25			48–75	P2 P3
12 May	09:40	Dinamo Moscow (Russia)	1–3	(Brazil) Rexona-Sesc Rio	23–25	25–23	23–25	23–25		94–98	P2 P3
12 May	18:10	Vakıfbank İstanbul (Turkey)	3–0	(Japan) Hisamitsu Springs	25–17	25–21	25–22			75–60	P2 P3

=== Pool B ===
Pos	Team	Pld	W	L	Pts	SW	SL	SR	SPW	SPL	SPR	Qualification
1	(Switzerland) Voléro Zürich	3	3	0	9	9	0	MAX	229	195	1.174	Semifinals
2	(Turkey) Eczacıbaşı VitrA	3	2	1	6	6	4	1.500	236	211	1.118	Semifinals
3	(Brazil) Vôlei Nestlé Osasco	3	1	2	3	4	6	0.667	215	219	0.982	Classification 5th-8th
4	(Japan) NEC Red Rockets	3	0	3	0	0	9	0.000	171	226	0.757	Classification 5th-8th

Date	Time		Score		Set 1	Set 2	Set 3	Set 4	Set 5	Total	Report
9 May	12:55	Voléro Zürich (Switzerland)	3–0	(Turkey) Eczacıbaşı VitrA	25–22	25–20	26–24			76–66	P2 P3
9 May	15:40	NEC Red Rockets (Japan)	0–3	(Brazil) Vôlei Nestlé Osasco	11–25	17–25	19–25			47–75	P2 P3
10 May	10:10	Vôlei Nestlé Osasco (Brazil)	1–3	(Turkey) Eczacıbaşı VitrA	21–25	25–20	16–25	13–25		75–95	P2 P3
10 May	15:40	NEC Red Rockets (Japan)	0–3	(Switzerland) Voléro Zürich	23–25	17–25	24–26			64–76	P2 P3
12 May	12:10	Voléro Zürich (Switzerland)	3–0	(Brazil) Vôlei Nestlé Osasco	27–25	25–22	25–18			77–65	P2 P3
12 May	14:40	Eczacıbaşı VitrA (Turkey)	3–0	(Japan) NEC Red Rockets	25–22	25–22	25–16			75–60	P2 P3

== Classification 5th-8th ==
- All times are Japan Standard Time (UTC+09:00).

Classification 5th-8th
13 May
(Russia) Dinamo Moscow	3
(Japan) NEC Red Rockets	1
13 May
(Brazil) Vôlei Nestlé Osasco	3
(Japan) Hisamitsu Springs	0

5th place match
14 May
(Russia) Dinamo Moscow	3
(Brazil) Vôlei Nestlé Osasco	1
7th place match
14 May
(Japan) NEC Red Rockets	3
(Japan) Hisamitsu Springs	0

=== Classification 5th-8th ===
Date	Time		Score		Set 1	Set 2	Set 3	Set 4	Set 5	Total	Report
13 May	10:10	Dinamo Moscow (Russia)	3–1	(Japan) NEC Red Rockets	25–15	22–25	25–15	25–18		97–73	P2 P3
13 May	19:10	Vôlei Nestlé Osasco (Brazil)	3–0	(Japan) Hisamitsu Springs	25–20	25–21	25–21			75–62	P2 P3

=== 7th place ===
Date	Time		Score		Set 1	Set 2	Set 3	Set 4	Set 5	Total	Report
14 May	15:15	NEC Red Rockets (Japan)	3–0	(Japan) Hisamitsu Springs	25–16	25–23	25–22			75–61	P2 P3

=== 5th place ===
Date	Time		Score		Set 1	Set 2	Set 3	Set 4	Set 5	Total	Report
14 May	9:40	Dinamo Moscow (Russia)	3–1	(Brazil) Vôlei Nestlé Osasco	22–25	25–19	27–25	25–18		99–87	P2 P3

== Final round ==
- All times are Japan Standard Time (UTC+09:00).

Semifinals
13 May
(Turkey) Vakıfbank	3
(Turkey) Eczacıbaşı	1
13 May
(Switzerland) Voléro Zürich	1
(Brazil) Sesc Rio	3

Final
14 May
(Turkey) Vakıfbank	3
(Brazil) Sesc Rio	0
3rd place match
14 May
(Turkey) Eczacıbaşı	2
(Switzerland) Voléro Zürich	3

=== Semifinals ===
Date	Time		Score		Set 1	Set 2	Set 3	Set 4	Set 5	Total	Report
13 May	12:55	Vakıfbank İstanbul (Turkey)	3–1	(Turkey) Eczacıbaşı VitrA	25–20	25–23	23–25	25–22		98–90	P2 P3
13 May	15:40	Voléro Zürich (Switzerland)	1–3	(Brazil) Rexona-Sesc Rio	13–25	16–25	25–21	24–26		78–97	P2 P3

=== 3rd place match ===
Date	Time		Score		Set 1	Set 2	Set 3	Set 4	Set 5	Total	Report
14 May	12:20	Eczacıbaşı VitrA (Turkey)	2–3	(Switzerland) Voléro Zürich	22–25	15–25	25–22	25–23	12–15	99–110	P2 P3

=== Final ===
Date	Time		Score		Set 1	Set 2	Set 3	Set 4	Set 5	Total	Report
14 May	19:10	Vakıfbank İstanbul (Turkey)	3–0	(Brazil) Rexona-Sesc Rio	25–19	25–21	25–21			75–61	P2 P3

== Final standing ==
Rank	Team
1st place, gold medalist(s)	(Turkey) Vakıfbank İstanbul
2nd place, silver medalist(s)	(Brazil) Rexona-Sesc Rio
3rd place, bronze medalist(s)	(Switzerland) Voléro Zürich
4	(Turkey) Eczacıbaşı VitrA
5	(Russia) Dinamo Moscow
6	(Brazil) Vôlei Nestlé Osasco
7	(Japan) NEC Red Rockets
8	(Japan) Hisamitsu Springs

2017 Women's Club World Champions

2nd title

14–player roster
Gizem Örge, Gözde Kırdar (c), Cansu Özbay, Zhu Ting, Kübra Çalışkan, Melis Gürkaynak, Ayça Aykaç, Lonneke Slöetjes, Naz Aydemir Akyol, Özge Nur Yurtdagülen, Melis Durul, Kimberly Hill, Milena Rašić, Cansu Çetin
Head coach
Giovanni Guidetti

== Awards ==
- Most valuable player
  (China) Zhu Ting (Vakıfbank İstanbul)
- Best Opposite
  (Serbia) Tijana Bošković (Eczacıbaşı VitrA)
- Best outside spikers
  (China) Zhu Ting (Vakıfbank İstanbul)
  (Brazil) Gabriela Guimarães (Rexona-Sesc Rio)
- Best middle blockers
  (Croatia) Maja Poljak (Dinamo Moscow)
  (Turkey) Kübra Akman (Vakıfbank İstanbul)
- Best setter
  (Japan) Kaname Yamaguchi (NEC Red Rockets)
- Best libero
  (Serbia) Silvija Popović (Voléro Zürich)

== See also ==
- 2017 FIVB Volleyball Men's Club World Championship
