= Brazilian Volleyball Super League (women) =

National women's volleyball championship of Brazil

Brazilian Women's Volleyball Super League
- Current season, competition or edition: Brazilian Women's Volleyball Super League 2025–26
- Formerly: Brazilian Championship; National League
- Sport: Volleyball
- Founded: 1976; 50 years ago (1994 in its current format)
- Administrator: CBV
- No. of teams: 12
- Country: Brazil
- Confederation: CSV
- Continent: South America
- Most recent champion: Praia Clube (3rd title) (2025–26)
- Most titles: Rio de Janeiro VC (12 titles)
- Broadcasters: SporTV; VBTV
- Website: SuperLiga

The Brazilian Volleyball Super League (Portuguese: Superliga Brasileira de Voleibol) is the top level Brazilian professional volleyball competition. It is organized by the Brazilian Volleyball Confederation. It shares the same name as the men's tournament, and are disputed simultaneously. The number of participating clubs varies every year. The champion team qualifies for the South American Championship.

== History ==
=== First competitions ===
Until the early 1960s, there were only state volleyball competitions in Brazil. A national level competition was inconceivable, because of the geographical distances and lack of transportation infrastructure. Only in 1962 the first national volleyball competition was disputed, the Guarani Trophy of Champion clubs (Portuguese: Troféu Guarani de Clubes Campeões). The competition was disputed two more times, being rename in 1964 to Brazilian Championship of Champion Clubs (Portuguese: Campeonato Brasileiro de Clubes Campeões). In 1965 started a three-years hiatus without a national level competition, until the Brazilian Trophy (Portuguese: Taça Brasil) was organized in 1968 with teams from Rio de Janeiro, São Paulo and Minas Gerais. It was organized in such format until 1975.

=== Fully national competition and professionalism ===
Only in 1976, the competition was opened to amateur clubs from all Brazilian states, and became truly national. It was renamed to Brazilian Championship (Portuguese: Campeonato Brasileiro) and was held every second year. In 1980 the Brazilian Championship had a major reorganization, becoming an annual competition and allowing professional teams for the first time. The competition's format changed in 1988, and started to follow the Northern Hemisphere calendar. Also, it was renamed to Brazilian National League (Portuguese: Liga Nacional). The competition was disputed under this format between the seasons 1988-89 and 1993–94.

=== The foundation of Super League ===
There was a last major change in the organization of the competition in the 1994–95 season. Again, it was renamed to Brazilian National Super League (Portuguese: Superliga Nacional). The first champion of the tournament, with the present format, was Leite Moça/Sorocaba.

== Current season ==
=== Teams ===
Team	City	Venue	Capacity	Club locations in Brazil (2025–26 season).
Brasília Vôlei	(Federal District (Brazil)) Brasília	Sesi Taguatinga	1,000	Club locations in Brazil (2025–26 season).
Fluminense	(Rio de Janeiro (state)) Rio de Janeiro	Hebraica	1,000	Club locations in Brazil (2025–26 season).
Mackenzie	(Minas Gerais) Belo Horizonte	Ginásio Mackenzie	900	Club locations in Brazil (2025–26 season).
Maringá	(Paraná (state)) Maringá	Ginásio Chico Neto	4,500	Club locations in Brazil (2025–26 season).
Minas	(Minas Gerais) Belo Horizonte	Arena Minas	3,650	Club locations in Brazil (2025–26 season).
Osasco	(São Paulo (state)) Osasco	Ginásio José Liberatti	4,500	Club locations in Brazil (2025–26 season).
Paulistano Barueri	(São Paulo (state)) Barueri	Ginásio José Corrêa	5,000	Club locations in Brazil (2025–26 season).
Praia Clube	(Minas Gerais) Uberlândia	Arena Praia	3,000	Club locations in Brazil (2025–26 season).
Renasce Sorocaba	(São Paulo (state)) Sorocaba	Sesi Sorocaba	500	Club locations in Brazil (2025–26 season).
SESC Flamengo	(Rio de Janeiro (state)) Rio de Janeiro	Maracanãzinho	1,000	Club locations in Brazil (2025–26 season).
SESI Bauru	(São Paulo (state)) Bauru	Ginásio Paulo Skaf	5,000	Club locations in Brazil (2025–26 season).
Tijuca Tênis Clube	(Rio de Janeiro (state)) Rio de Janeiro	Ginásio Tijuca	2,000	Club locations in Brazil (2025–26 season).

== List of champions ==
Season	Champion	Runner-up
Brazilian Championship
1976	Fluminense	CRB
1978	Flamengo	Minas
1980	Flamengo	Fluminense
1981	Fluminense	Minas
1982	Paulistano	Pirelli/Santo André
1983	Supergasbras	Fluminense
1984	Bradesco Atlântica	Supergasbras
1985	Supergasbras	Paulistano
1986	Supergasbras	Bradesco Atlântica
1987	Lufkin	Supergasbras
National League
1988–89	Sadia	Lufkin
1989–90	Sadia	Supergasbras
1990–91	Sadia	São Caetano
1991–92	São Caetano	Minas
1992–93	Minas	São Caetano
1993–94	Nossa Caixa-Recra	BCN/Guarujá
Super League
1994–95	Leite Moça/Sorocaba	BCN/Guarujá
1995–96	Leite Moça/Sorocaba	BCN/Guarujá
1996–97	Leite Moça/Sorocaba	Uniban
1997–98	Paraná VC	Leite Moça/Sorocaba
1998–99	Uniban	Paraná VC
1999–00	Paraná VC	Minas
2000–01	Flamengo	Vasco da Gama
2001–02	Minas	Osasco
2002–03	Osasco	Minas
2003–04	Osasco	Minas
2004–05	Osasco	Rio de Janeiro VC
2005–06	Rio de Janeiro VC	Osasco
2006–07	Rio de Janeiro VC	Osasco
2007–08	Rio de Janeiro VC	Osasco
2008–09	Rio de Janeiro VC	Osasco
2009–10	Osasco	Rio de Janeiro VC
2010–11	Rio de Janeiro VC	Osasco
2011–12	Osasco	Rio de Janeiro VC
2012–13	Rio de Janeiro VC	Osasco
2013–14	Rio de Janeiro VC	SESI-SP
2014–15	Rio de Janeiro VC	Osasco
2015–16	Rio de Janeiro VC	Praia Clube
2016–17	Rio de Janeiro VC	Osasco
2017–18	Praia Clube	Rio de Janeiro VC
2018–19	Minas	Praia Clube
2019–20	Canceled after the regular season due to the COVID-19 pandemic.	
2020–21	Minas	Praia Clube
2021–22	Minas	Praia Clube
2022–23	Praia Clube	Minas
2023–24	Minas	Praia Clube
2024–25	Osasco	SESI Bauru
2025–26	Praia Clube	Minas

== Titles by team ==
Club	Winners	Runners-up
Rio de Janeiro VC	12 (1998, 2000, 2006, 2007, 2008, 2009, 2011, 2013, 2014, 2015, 2016, 2017)	5 (1999, 2005, 2010, 2012, 2018)
Osasco	6 (2003, 2004, 2005, 2010, 2012, 2025)	12 (1994, 1995, 1996, 2002, 2006, 2007, 2008, 2009, 2011, 2013, 2015, 2017)
Minas	6 (1993, 2002, 2019, 2021, 2022, 2024)	8 (1978, 1981, 1992, 2000, 2003, 2004, 2023, 2026)
Praia Clube	3 (2018, 2023, 2026)	5 (2016, 2019, 2021, 2022, 2024)
Supergasbras/Rio de Janeiro	3 (1983, 1985, 1986)	3 (1984, 1987, 1990)
Sorocaba	3 (1995, 1996, 1997)	1 (1998)
Flamengo	3 (1978, 1980, 2001)	0
Sadia/São Paulo	3 (1989, 1990, 1991)	0
Fluminense	2 (1976, 1981)	2 (1980, 1983)
São Caetano	1 (1992)	2 (1991, 1993)
Paulistano	1 (1982)	1 (1985)
Lufkin/Rio de Janeiro	1 (1987)	1 (1989)
São Bernardo do Campo	1 (1999)	1 (1997)
Atlântica	1 (1984)	0
Ribeirão Preto	1 (1994)	0
CRB	0	1 (1976)
Bradesco/Rio de Janeiro	0	1 (1986)
Vasco	0	1 (2001)
SESI-SP	0	1 (2014)
Vôlei Bauru	0	1 (2025)

== See also ==
- Brazilian Men's Volleyball Superliga
