= 2010 FIVB World Grand Prix squads =

This article show all participating team squads at the 2010 FIVB Women's Volleyball World Grand Prix, played by twelve countries with the final round held in Ningbo, China.

== Brazil ==
The following is the Brazil roster in the 2010 FIVB World Grand Prix.

#	Name	Date of birth	Height	Weight	Spike	Block	Club
1	Fabiana Claudino	24 January 1985	193 cm (6 ft 4 in)	76 kg (168 lb)	314 cm (10 ft 4 in)	293 cm (9 ft 7 in)	SESI - SP
2	Caroline Gattaz	27 July 1981	191 cm (6 ft 3 in)	87 kg (192 lb)	304 cm (10 ft 0 in)	280 cm (9 ft 2 in)	UNILEVER
3	Danielle Lins	5 January 1985	181 cm (5 ft 11 in)	68 kg (150 lb)	290 cm (9 ft 6 in)	276 cm (9 ft 1 in)	Molico/Nestlé
4	Paula Pequeno	22 January 1982	184 cm (6 ft 0 in)	74 kg (163 lb)	302 cm (9 ft 11 in)	285 cm (9 ft 4 in)	FENERBAHCE
5	Adenizia da Silva	18 December 1986	185 cm (6 ft 1 in)	63 kg (139 lb)	312 cm (10 ft 3 in)	290 cm (9 ft 6 in)	Molico/Nestlé
6	Thaisa Menezes	15 May 1987	196 cm (6 ft 5 in)	79 kg (174 lb)	316 cm (10 ft 4 in)	301 cm (9 ft 11 in)	Molico/Nestlé
7	Marianne Steinbrecher	23 August 1983	188 cm (6 ft 2 in)	70 kg (150 lb)	310 cm (10 ft 2 in)	290 cm (9 ft 6 in)	FENERBAHCE
8	Jaqueline Carvalho	31 December 1983	186 cm (6 ft 1 in)	70 kg (150 lb)	302 cm (9 ft 11 in)	286 cm (9 ft 5 in)	Minas Tênis Clube
9	Natalia Martins	12 November 1984	185 cm (6 ft 1 in)	69 kg (152 lb)	300 cm (9 ft 10 in)	286 cm (9 ft 5 in)	E.C. Pinheiros
10	Welissa Gonzaga	9 September 1982	179 cm (5 ft 10 in)	76 kg (168 lb)	300 cm (9 ft 10 in)	287 cm (9 ft 5 in)	Dentil Praia Clube
11	Joyce Silva	13 June 1984	190 cm (6 ft 3 in)	67 kg (148 lb)	311 cm (10 ft 2 in)	294 cm (9 ft 8 in)	KGC Pro Volleyball Club-KO
12	Natália Pereira	4 April 1989	183 cm (6 ft 0 in)	76 kg (168 lb)	300 cm (9 ft 10 in)	288 cm (9 ft 5 in)	Rexona-Ades
13	Sheilla Castro	1 July 1983	185 cm (6 ft 1 in)	64 kg (141 lb)	302 cm (9 ft 11 in)	284 cm (9 ft 4 in)	Vakifbank
14	Fabiana Oliveira	7 March 1980	169 cm (5 ft 7 in)	59 kg (130 lb)	276 cm (9 ft 1 in)	266 cm (8 ft 9 in)	Unilever Volei
15	Ana Tiemi Takagui	26 October 1987	187 cm (6 ft 2 in)	74 kg (163 lb)	295 cm (9 ft 8 in)	284 cm (9 ft 4 in)	Bursa B.B. SK
16	Fernanda Rodrigues	10 May 1986	179 cm (5 ft 10 in)	74 kg (163 lb)	308 cm (10 ft 1 in)	288 cm (9 ft 5 in)	Dinamo Krasnodar
17	Fabiola de Sousa	3 February 1983	184 cm (6 ft 0 in)	70 kg (150 lb)	300 cm (9 ft 10 in)	285 cm (9 ft 4 in)	Dinamo Krasnodar
18	Camila Brait	28 October 1988	170 cm (5 ft 7 in)	58 kg (128 lb)	271 cm (8 ft 11 in)	256 cm (8 ft 5 in)	Molico/Nestlé
19	Juciely Cristina Barreto	18 December 1980	184 cm (6 ft 0 in)	71 kg (157 lb)	289 cm (9 ft 6 in)	285 cm (9 ft 4 in)	UNILEVER

== China ==
The following is the China roster in the 2010 FIVB World Grand Prix.

#	Name	Date of birth	Height	Weight	Spike	Block	Club
1	Wang Yimei	11 January 1988	190 cm (6 ft 3 in)	87 kg (192 lb)	318 cm (10 ft 5 in)	305 cm (10 ft 0 in)	Liaoning
2	Zhang Lei	11 January 1985	181 cm (5 ft 11 in)	71 kg (157 lb)	316 cm (10 ft 4 in)	310 cm (10 ft 2 in)	Shanghai
3	Yang Jie	1 March 1994	194 cm (6 ft 4 in)	82 kg (181 lb)	312 cm (10 ft 3 in)	300 cm (9 ft 10 in)	Shanghai
4	Hui Ruoqi	4 March 1991	189 cm (6 ft 2 in)	70 kg (150 lb)	312 cm (10 ft 3 in)	305 cm (10 ft 0 in)	Jiangsu
5	Luo Yu	27 February 1987	190 cm (6 ft 3 in)	75 kg (165 lb)	310 cm (10 ft 2 in)	300 cm (9 ft 10 in)	Zhejiang
6	Wang Nan	13 August 1984	181 cm (5 ft 11 in)	67 kg (148 lb)	305 cm (10 ft 0 in)	295 cm (9 ft 8 in)	Guangdong Evergrande
7	Zhang Xian	16 March 1985	168 cm (5 ft 6 in)	57 kg (126 lb)	290 cm (9 ft 6 in)	280 cm (9 ft 2 in)	Guangdong Evergrande
8	Wei Qiuyue	26 September 1988	182 cm (6 ft 0 in)	65 kg (143 lb)	305 cm (10 ft 0 in)	300 cm (9 ft 10 in)	Tianjin
9	Wang Qian	14 March 1989	174 cm (5 ft 9 in)	65 kg (143 lb)	305 cm (10 ft 0 in)	295 cm (9 ft 8 in)	Tianjin
10	Li Juan	15 May 1981	187 cm (6 ft 2 in)	72 kg (159 lb)	315 cm (10 ft 4 in)	305 cm (10 ft 0 in)	Tianjin
11	Xu Yunli	2 August 1987	196 cm (6 ft 5 in)	75 kg (165 lb)	317 cm (10 ft 5 in)	315 cm (10 ft 4 in)	Fujian
12	Xue Ming	23 February 1987	193 cm (6 ft 4 in)	72 kg (159 lb)	324 cm (10 ft 8 in)	315 cm (10 ft 4 in)	Beijing
13	Yin Na	3 February 1988	182 cm (6 ft 0 in)	65 kg (143 lb)	305 cm (10 ft 0 in)	300 cm (9 ft 10 in)	Tianjin
14	Chen Liyi	27 April 1989	184 cm (6 ft 0 in)	75 kg (165 lb)	302 cm (9 ft 11 in)	290 cm (9 ft 6 in)	Tianjin
15	Ma Yunwen	19 October 1986	190 cm (6 ft 3 in)	76 kg (168 lb)	315 cm (10 ft 4 in)	307 cm (10 ft 1 in)	Shanghai
16	Bian Yuqian	14 June 1990	180 cm (5 ft 11 in)	70 kg (150 lb)	300 cm (9 ft 10 in)	292 cm (9 ft 7 in)	Shanghai
17	Chen Yao	25 September 1988	191 cm (6 ft 3 in)	74 kg (163 lb)	315 cm (10 ft 4 in)	305 cm (10 ft 0 in)	Army
18	Fan Linlin	1 December 1991	190 cm (6 ft 3 in)	77 kg (170 lb)	316 cm (10 ft 4 in)	301 cm (9 ft 11 in)	Army

== Chinese Taipei ==
The following is the Chinese Taipei roster in the 2010 FIVB World Grand Prix.

#	Name	Date of birth	Height	Weight	Spike	Block	Club
1	Teng Yen-min	9 February 1984	172 cm (5 ft 8 in)	65 kg (143 lb)	293 cm (9 ft 7 in)	286 cm (9 ft 5 in)	0
2	Tsai Yin-feng	6 November 1984	181 cm (5 ft 11 in)	75 kg (165 lb)	291 cm (9 ft 7 in)	280 cm (9 ft 2 in)	Taiwan Power
3	Chen Wan-ting	25 November 1990	178 cm (5 ft 10 in)	67 kg (148 lb)	290 cm (9 ft 6 in)	280 cm (9 ft 2 in)	NTNU
4	Liao Wan-ju	19 April 1984	175 cm (5 ft 9 in)	68 kg (150 lb)	290 cm (9 ft 6 in)	275 cm (9 ft 0 in)	0
5	Wu Ko-jou	17 November 1985	175 cm (5 ft 9 in)	75 kg (165 lb)	285 cm (9 ft 4 in)	275 cm (9 ft 0 in)	Taiwan Power
6	Yen Pei-ling	5 January 1986	174 cm (5 ft 9 in)	65 kg (143 lb)	270 cm (8 ft 10 in)	268 cm (8 ft 10 in)	Taiwan Power
7	Hsieh Yi-ting	7 October 1987	166 cm (5 ft 5 in)	62 kg (137 lb)	265 cm (8 ft 8 in)	250 cm (8 ft 2 in)	Taiwan Power
8	Ho Yen-chih	26 November 1987	171 cm (5 ft 7 in)	63 kg (139 lb)	280 cm (9 ft 2 in)	270 cm (8 ft 10 in)	Taiwan Power
9	Huang Szu-chi	31 March 1988	180 cm (5 ft 11 in)	69 kg (152 lb)	285 cm (9 ft 4 in)	275 cm (9 ft 0 in)	NTNU
10	Wu Shu-fen	7 April 1989	175 cm (5 ft 9 in)	68 kg (150 lb)	281 cm (9 ft 3 in)	272 cm (8 ft 11 in)	Taiwan Power
11	Yang Ya-chu	8 July 1991	173 cm (5 ft 8 in)	62 kg (137 lb)	278 cm (9 ft 1 in)	268 cm (8 ft 10 in)	NTNU
12	Yang Meng-hua	15 August 1991	170 cm (5 ft 7 in)	68 kg (150 lb)	270 cm (8 ft 10 in)	262 cm (8 ft 7 in)	Taiwan Power
13	Wen I-tzu	31 October 1991	175 cm (5 ft 9 in)	64 kg (141 lb)	281 cm (9 ft 3 in)	273 cm (8 ft 11 in)	Taiwan Power

== Dominican Republic ==
The following is the Dominican Republic roster in the 2010 FIVB World Grand Prix.

#	Name	Date of birth	Height	Weight	Spike	Block	Club
1	Annerys Victoria Vargas Valdez	7 August 1981	196 cm (6 ft 5 in)	70 kg (150 lb)	327 cm (10 ft 9 in)	320 cm (10 ft 6 in)	Seleccion Nacional
2	Rossy Dahiana Burgos Herrera	7 April 1985	184 cm (6 ft 0 in)	70 kg (150 lb)	305 cm (10 ft 0 in)	300 cm (9 ft 10 in)	Seleccion Nacional
3	Lisvel Elisa Eve Mejia	10 September 1991	194 cm (6 ft 4 in)	70 kg (150 lb)	325 cm (10 ft 8 in)	315 cm (10 ft 4 in)	Mirador
4	Marianne Fersola Norberto	16 January 1992	191 cm (6 ft 3 in)	60 kg (130 lb)	315 cm (10 ft 4 in)	310 cm (10 ft 2 in)	Mirador
5	Brenda Castillo	5 June 1992	167 cm (5 ft 6 in)	55 kg (121 lb)	245 cm (8 ft 0 in)	230 cm (7 ft 7 in)	San Cristobal
6	Carmen Rosa Caso Sierra	29 November 1981	168 cm (5 ft 6 in)	59 kg (130 lb)	240 cm (7 ft 10 in)	230 cm (7 ft 7 in)	Mirador
7	Niverka Dharlenis Marte Frica	19 October 1990	178 cm (5 ft 10 in)	71 kg (157 lb)	295 cm (9 ft 8 in)	283 cm (9 ft 3 in)	Deportivo Nacional
8	Candida Estefany Arias Perez	11 March 1992	194 cm (6 ft 4 in)	68 kg (150 lb)	320 cm (10 ft 6 in)	315 cm (10 ft 4 in)	San Cristobal
9	Sidarka De Los Milagros Nuñez	25 June 1984	185 cm (6 ft 1 in)	62 kg (137 lb)	330 cm (10 ft 10 in)	320 cm (10 ft 6 in)	Club Malanga
10	Milagros Cabral De La Cruz	17 October 1978	182 cm (6 ft 0 in)	63 kg (139 lb)	325 cm (10 ft 8 in)	320 cm (10 ft 6 in)	Los Cachorros
11	Jeoselyna Rodriguez Santos	9 December 1991	187 cm (6 ft 2 in)	63 kg (139 lb)	325 cm (10 ft 8 in)	315 cm (10 ft 4 in)	Mirador
12	Karla Miguelina Echenique Medina	16 May 1986	181 cm (5 ft 11 in)	62 kg (137 lb)	279 cm (9 ft 2 in)	300 cm (9 ft 10 in)	Mirador
13	Cindy Carolina Rondon Martinez	12 November 1987	186 cm (6 ft 1 in)	61 kg (134 lb)	320 cm (10 ft 6 in)	315 cm (10 ft 4 in)	Seleccion Nacional
14	Prisilla Altagracia Rivera Brens	29 December 1984	186 cm (6 ft 1 in)	70 kg (150 lb)	320 cm (10 ft 6 in)	315 cm (10 ft 4 in)	San Pedro
15	Cosiri Rodriguez Andino	30 August 1977	191 cm (6 ft 3 in)	72 kg (159 lb)	313 cm (10 ft 3 in)	305 cm (10 ft 0 in)	San Cristobal
16	Gabriela Alexandra Reyes Hinojosa	6 November 1992	175 cm (5 ft 9 in)	77 kg (170 lb)	265 cm (8 ft 8 in)	268 cm (8 ft 10 in)	Mirador
17	Gina Altagracia Mambru Casilla	21 January 1986	182 cm (6 ft 0 in)	65 kg (143 lb)	330 cm (10 ft 10 in)	315 cm (10 ft 4 in)	Los Cachorros
18	Bethania De La Cruz De Peña	13 May 1987	188 cm (6 ft 2 in)	70 kg (150 lb)	330 cm (10 ft 10 in)	320 cm (10 ft 6 in)	Deportivo Nacional
19	Ana Yorkira Binet Stephens	9 February 1992	174 cm (5 ft 9 in)	58 kg (128 lb)	280 cm (9 ft 2 in)	260 cm (8 ft 6 in)	Samana

== Germany ==
The following is the Germany roster in the 2010 FIVB World Grand Prix.

#	Name	Date of birth	Height	Weight	Spike	Block	Club
1	Lenka Dürr	10 December 1990	171 cm (5 ft 7 in)	59 kg (130 lb)	280 cm (9 ft 2 in)	270 cm (8 ft 10 in)	Azeryol Baku
2	Kathleen Weiß	2 February 1984	171 cm (5 ft 7 in)	66 kg (146 lb)	290 cm (9 ft 6 in)	273 cm (8 ft 11 in)	Igtisadchi Baku
3	Denise Hanke	31 August 1989	179 cm (5 ft 10 in)	58 kg (128 lb)	284 cm (9 ft 4 in)	272 cm (8 ft 11 in)	Impel Wroclaw
4	Kerstin Tzscherlich	15 February 1978	179 cm (5 ft 10 in)	72 kg (159 lb)	295 cm (9 ft 8 in)	282 cm (9 ft 3 in)	Dresdner SC
5	Lena Möllers	6 January 1990	188 cm (6 ft 2 in)	74 kg (163 lb)	312 cm (10 ft 3 in)	297 cm (9 ft 9 in)	Neruda Volley Bolzano
6	Saskia Hippe	16 January 1991	185 cm (6 ft 1 in)	67 kg (148 lb)	315 cm (10 ft 4 in)	292 cm (9 ft 7 in)	Schweriner SC
7	Imke Wedekind	23 June 1984	195 cm (6 ft 5 in)	78 kg (172 lb)	307 cm (10 ft 1 in)	295 cm (9 ft 8 in)	VT Aurubis Hamburg
8	Berit Kauffeldt	8 July 1990	190 cm (6 ft 3 in)	75 kg (165 lb)	311 cm (10 ft 2 in)	294 cm (9 ft 8 in)	Impel Wroclaw/POL
9	Corina Ssuschke-Voigt	9 May 1983	189 cm (6 ft 2 in)	75 kg (165 lb)	310 cm (10 ft 2 in)	298 cm (9 ft 9 in)	Lokomotiv Baku
10	Anne Matthes	30 April 1985	182 cm (6 ft 0 in)	66 kg (146 lb)	312 cm (10 ft 3 in)	295 cm (9 ft 8 in)	Dresdner SC
11	Janine Völker	19 September 1991	178 cm (5 ft 10 in)	69 kg (152 lb)	301 cm (9 ft 11 in)	290 cm (9 ft 6 in)	Schweriner SC
12	Heike Beier	9 December 1983	184 cm (6 ft 0 in)	73 kg (161 lb)	305 cm (10 ft 0 in)	293 cm (9 ft 7 in)	BKF Aluprof Bielsko Biala
13	Sarah Petrausch	31 July 1990	187 cm (6 ft 2 in)	85 kg (187 lb)	306 cm (10 ft 0 in)	295 cm (9 ft 8 in)	Rote Raben Vilsbiburg
14	Margareta Kozuch	30 October 1986	187 cm (6 ft 2 in)	70 kg (150 lb)	309 cm (10 ft 2 in)	297 cm (9 ft 9 in)	RebecchiNordameccanica Piacenz
15	Maren Brinker	10 July 1986	184 cm (6 ft 0 in)	68 kg (150 lb)	303 cm (9 ft 11 in)	295 cm (9 ft 8 in)	Montichiari Volley
16	Anja Brandt	15 February 1990	195 cm (6 ft 5 in)	77 kg (170 lb)	310 cm (10 ft 2 in)	295 cm (9 ft 8 in)	Schweriner SC
17	Patricia Grohmann	27 January 1990	186 cm (6 ft 1 in)	80 kg (180 lb)	303 cm (9 ft 11 in)	289 cm (9 ft 6 in)	Köpenicker SC
18	Nadja Schaus	8 November 1984	187 cm (6 ft 2 in)	66 kg (146 lb)	305 cm (10 ft 0 in)	295 cm (9 ft 8 in)	Sigel Pallavolo Marsala
19	Tatjana Zautys	4 May 1980	182 cm (6 ft 0 in)	71 kg (157 lb)	308 cm (10 ft 1 in)	293 cm (9 ft 7 in)	Rote Raben Vilsbiburg

== Italy ==
The following is the Italy roster in the 2010 FIVB World Grand Prix.

#	Name	Date of birth	Height	Weight	Spike	Block	Club
1	Chiara Di Iulio	5 May 1985	184 cm (6 ft 0 in)	65 kg (143 lb)	291 cm (9 ft 7 in)	278 cm (9 ft 1 in)	Foppapedretti Bergamo
2	Cristina Barcellini	20 November 1986	183 cm (6 ft 0 in)	78 kg (172 lb)	307 cm (10 ft 1 in)	292 cm (9 ft 7 in)	Imoco Volley Conegliano
3	Ilaria Garzaro	29 September 1986	189 cm (6 ft 2 in)	70 kg (150 lb)	312 cm (10 ft 3 in)	292 cm (9 ft 7 in)	Chateau d'Ax Urbino Volley
4	Lucia Crisanti	16 March 1986	186 cm (6 ft 1 in)	70 kg (150 lb)	312 cm (10 ft 3 in)	292 cm (9 ft 7 in)	Chateau D'Ax Urbino Volley
5	Giulia Rondon	16 October 1987	189 cm (6 ft 2 in)	74 kg (163 lb)	304 cm (10 ft 0 in)	280 cm (9 ft 2 in)	ICOS Crema
6	Enrica Merlo	28 December 1988	170 cm (5 ft 7 in)	60 kg (130 lb)	281 cm (9 ft 3 in)	262 cm (8 ft 7 in)	Foppapedretti Bergamo
7	Annamaria Quaranta	19 October 1981	184 cm (6 ft 0 in)	67 kg (148 lb)	305 cm (10 ft 0 in)	280 cm (9 ft 2 in)	Despar Sirio Perugia
8	Jenny Barazza	24 July 1981	188 cm (6 ft 2 in)	77 kg (170 lb)	300 cm (9 ft 10 in)	285 cm (9 ft 4 in)	Liu Jo Volley Modena
9	Francesca Marcon	9 July 1983	180 cm (5 ft 11 in)	65 kg (143 lb)	301 cm (9 ft 11 in)	282 cm (9 ft 3 in)	Zoppas Industries
10	Paola Cardullo	18 March 1982	159 cm (5 ft 3 in)	56 kg (123 lb)	275 cm (9 ft 0 in)	268 cm (8 ft 10 in)	0
11	Serena Ortolani	7 January 1987	187 cm (6 ft 2 in)	63 kg (139 lb)	308 cm (10 ft 1 in)	288 cm (9 ft 5 in)	Pomì Casalmaggiore
12	Francesca Piccinini	10 January 1979	184 cm (6 ft 0 in)	71 kg (157 lb)	304 cm (10 ft 0 in)	279 cm (9 ft 2 in)	Liu Jo Modena
13	Valentina Arrighetti	26 January 1985	185 cm (6 ft 1 in)	72 kg (159 lb)	318 cm (10 ft 5 in)	310 cm (10 ft 2 in)	Lokomotiv Baku
14	Eleonora Lo Bianco	22 December 1979	171 cm (5 ft 7 in)	67 kg (148 lb)	287 cm (9 ft 5 in)	273 cm (8 ft 11 in)	Galatasaray Istanbul
15	Antonella Del Core	5 November 1980	180 cm (5 ft 11 in)	70 kg (150 lb)	296 cm (9 ft 9 in)	279 cm (9 ft 2 in)	Fakel Novyj Urengoj
16	Lucia Bosetti	9 July 1989	175 cm (5 ft 9 in)	65 kg (143 lb)	316 cm (10 ft 4 in)	286 cm (9 ft 5 in)	Nordmeccanica Piacenza
17	Simona Gioli	17 September 1977	185 cm (6 ft 1 in)	70 kg (150 lb)	307 cm (10 ft 1 in)	283 cm (9 ft 3 in)	Fakel Novyj Urengoj
18	Marta Bechis	4 September 1989	181 cm (5 ft 11 in)	59 kg (130 lb)	290 cm (9 ft 6 in)	273 cm (8 ft 11 in)	Asystel Volley Novara

== Japan ==
The following is the Japan roster in the 2010 FIVB World Grand Prix.

#	Name	Date of birth	Height	Weight	Spike	Block	Club
1	Hiroko Matsuura	15 July 1990	180 cm (5 ft 11 in)	76 kg (168 lb)	302 cm (9 ft 11 in)	280 cm (9 ft 2 in)	Azeryolservis - Baku
2	Saori Arita	10 July 1984	180 cm (5 ft 11 in)	71 kg (157 lb)	305 cm (10 ft 0 in)	296 cm (9 ft 9 in)	0
3	Yoshie Takeshita	18 March 1978	159 cm (5 ft 3 in)	53 kg (117 lb)	280 cm (9 ft 2 in)	270 cm (8 ft 10 in)	JT Marvelous
4	Kaori Inoue	21 October 1982	182 cm (6 ft 0 in)	59 kg (130 lb)	306 cm (10 ft 0 in)	300 cm (9 ft 10 in)	Denso Airybees
5	Ai Yamamoto	24 March 1982	184 cm (6 ft 0 in)	68 kg (150 lb)	312 cm (10 ft 3 in)	305 cm (10 ft 0 in)	JT Marvelous
6	Yuko Sano	26 July 1979	159 cm (5 ft 3 in)	54 kg (119 lb)	260 cm (8 ft 6 in)	250 cm (8 ft 2 in)	Denso Airybees
7	Mai Yamaguchi	3 July 1983	176 cm (5 ft 9 in)	62 kg (137 lb)	304 cm (10 ft 0 in)	292 cm (9 ft 7 in)	Okayama Seagulls
8	Chie Yoshizawa	9 July 1983	172 cm (5 ft 8 in)	66 kg (146 lb)	294 cm (9 ft 8 in)	288 cm (9 ft 5 in)	JT Marvelous
9	Mizuho Ishida	22 January 1988	174 cm (5 ft 9 in)	65 kg (143 lb)	301 cm (9 ft 11 in)	286 cm (9 ft 5 in)	Denso Airybees
10	Yuki Shoji	19 November 1981	182 cm (6 ft 0 in)	67 kg (148 lb)	315 cm (10 ft 4 in)	296 cm (9 ft 9 in)	VC Wiesbaden
11	Erika Araki	3 August 1984	186 cm (6 ft 1 in)	78 kg (172 lb)	307 cm (10 ft 1 in)	295 cm (9 ft 8 in)	Ageo Medics
12	Saori Kimura	19 August 1986	185 cm (6 ft 1 in)	65 kg (143 lb)	304 cm (10 ft 0 in)	293 cm (9 ft 7 in)	Toray Arrows
13	Mai Fukuda	30 January 1984	176 cm (5 ft 9 in)	65 kg (143 lb)	298 cm (9 ft 9 in)	280 cm (9 ft 2 in)	Okayama Seagulls
14	Yukiko Ebata	7 November 1989	176 cm (5 ft 9 in)	67 kg (148 lb)	305 cm (10 ft 0 in)	298 cm (9 ft 9 in)	Racing Club Cannes
15	Koyomi Tominaga	1 May 1989	175 cm (5 ft 9 in)	67 kg (148 lb)	303 cm (9 ft 11 in)	285 cm (9 ft 4 in)	Pioneer Red Wings
16	Saori Sakoda	18 December 1987	175 cm (5 ft 9 in)	63 kg (139 lb)	305 cm (10 ft 0 in)	279 cm (9 ft 2 in)	Toray Arrows
17	Akiko Ino	28 September 1986	168 cm (5 ft 6 in)	59 kg (130 lb)	270 cm (8 ft 10 in)	260 cm (8 ft 6 in)	NEC Red Rockets
18	Maiko Sakashita	25 February 1985	180 cm (5 ft 11 in)	74 kg (163 lb)	302 cm (9 ft 11 in)	296 cm (9 ft 9 in)	JT Marvelous
19	Kanari Hamaguchi	29 August 1985	167 cm (5 ft 6 in)	60 kg (130 lb)	283 cm (9 ft 3 in)	269 cm (8 ft 10 in)	Toray Arrows

== Netherlands ==
The following is the Netherlands roster in the 2010 FIVB World Grand Prix.

#	Name	Date of birth	Height	Weight	Spike	Block	Club
2	Femke Stoltenborg	30 July 1991	189 cm (6 ft 2 in)	81 kg (179 lb)	303 cm (9 ft 11 in)	299 cm (9 ft 10 in)	MTV Stuttgart
3	Francien Huurman	18 April 1975	192 cm (6 ft 4 in)	80 kg (180 lb)	313 cm (10 ft 3 in)	292 cm (9 ft 7 in)	--
4	Chaïne Staelens	7 November 1980	194 cm (6 ft 4 in)	79 kg (174 lb)	316 cm (10 ft 4 in)	299 cm (9 ft 10 in)	Denso Airybees
5	Robin De Kruijf	5 May 1991	192 cm (6 ft 4 in)	81 kg (179 lb)	313 cm (10 ft 3 in)	300 cm (9 ft 10 in)	VakifBank Istanbul
6	Maret Balkestein-Grothues	16 September 1988	180 cm (5 ft 11 in)	68 kg (150 lb)	304 cm (10 ft 0 in)	285 cm (9 ft 4 in)	PGE Atom
7	Quinta Steenbergen	2 April 1985	189 cm (6 ft 2 in)	75 kg (165 lb)	309 cm (10 ft 2 in)	300 cm (9 ft 10 in)	VK Agel Prostejov
8	Alice Blom	7 April 1980	178 cm (5 ft 10 in)	64 kg (141 lb)	305 cm (10 ft 0 in)	280 cm (9 ft 2 in)	Iqtisadci University Baku
9	Myrthe Schoot	29 August 1988	182 cm (6 ft 0 in)	70 kg (150 lb)	298 cm (9 ft 9 in)	286 cm (9 ft 5 in)	Dresdner SC
10	Janneke Van Tienen	29 May 1979	177 cm (5 ft 10 in)	73 kg (161 lb)	294 cm (9 ft 8 in)	273 cm (8 ft 11 in)	--
11	Caroline Wensink	4 August 1984	186 cm (6 ft 1 in)	80 kg (180 lb)	309 cm (10 ft 2 in)	305 cm (10 ft 0 in)	Azerrail Baku
12	Manon Nummerdor-Flier	8 February 1984	192 cm (6 ft 4 in)	71 kg (157 lb)	315 cm (10 ft 4 in)	301 cm (9 ft 11 in)	Zhengrong Fujian
13	Anne Buijs	2 December 1991	191 cm (6 ft 3 in)	73 kg (161 lb)	317 cm (10 ft 5 in)	299 cm (9 ft 10 in)	Vakifbank Istanbul
14	Laura Dijkema	18 February 1990	184 cm (6 ft 0 in)	70 kg (150 lb)	293 cm (9 ft 7 in)	279 cm (9 ft 2 in)	Dresdner SC
15	Ingrid Visser	4 June 1977	190 cm (6 ft 3 in)	74 kg (163 lb)	314 cm (10 ft 4 in)	298 cm (9 ft 9 in)	Murcia 2005
16	Debby Stam-Pilon	24 July 1984	184 cm (6 ft 0 in)	69 kg (152 lb)	303 cm (9 ft 11 in)	281 cm (9 ft 3 in)	Rocheville Le Cannet
17	Nicole Koolhaas	31 January 1991	198 cm (6 ft 6 in)	77 kg (170 lb)	310 cm (10 ft 2 in)	300 cm (9 ft 10 in)	VFM Volley Franches-Montagnes
18	Judith Blansjaar	23 May 1990	177 cm (5 ft 10 in)	73 kg (161 lb)	286 cm (9 ft 5 in)	272 cm (8 ft 11 in)	TVC Amstelveen
19	Lonneke Slöetjes	15 November 1990	191 cm (6 ft 3 in)	76 kg (168 lb)	322 cm (10 ft 7 in)	315 cm (10 ft 4 in)	Vakifbank Istanbul

== Poland ==
The following is the Poland roster in the 2010 FIVB World Grand Prix.

#	Name	Date of birth	Height	Weight	Spike	Block	Club
1	Katarzyna Skowronska-Dolata	30 June 1983	189 cm (6 ft 2 in)	75 kg (165 lb)	314 cm (10 ft 4 in)	296 cm (9 ft 9 in)	Rabita Baku
2	Mariola Zenik	3 July 1982	175 cm (5 ft 9 in)	65 kg (143 lb)	300 cm (9 ft 10 in)	295 cm (9 ft 8 in)	Bank BPS Muszynianka
3	Karolina Rozycka	28 June 1985	183 cm (6 ft 0 in)	68 kg (150 lb)	305 cm (10 ft 0 in)	284 cm (9 ft 4 in)	Yesilyurt
4	Katarzyna Konieczna	22 March 1985	184 cm (6 ft 0 in)	75 kg (165 lb)	304 cm (10 ft 0 in)	288 cm (9 ft 5 in)	Impel Volleyball
5	Katarzyna Skorupa	16 September 1984	183 cm (6 ft 0 in)	69 kg (152 lb)	302 cm (9 ft 11 in)	296 cm (9 ft 9 in)	Rabita BAKU (AZE)
6	Agnieszka Bednarek-Kasza	20 February 1986	185 cm (6 ft 1 in)	71 kg (157 lb)	310 cm (10 ft 2 in)	295 cm (9 ft 8 in)	Bank BPS Muszynianka
7	Berenika Tomsia	18 March 1988	188 cm (6 ft 2 in)	72 kg (159 lb)	310 cm (10 ft 2 in)	302 cm (9 ft 11 in)	FENERBAHCE
8	Katarzyna Zaroslinska	3 February 1987	187 cm (6 ft 2 in)	72 kg (159 lb)	312 cm (10 ft 3 in)	290 cm (9 ft 6 in)	Atom Trefl
9	Joanna Staniucha-Szczurek	5 December 1981	184 cm (6 ft 0 in)	76 kg (168 lb)	303 cm (9 ft 11 in)	290 cm (9 ft 6 in)	Tauron MKS
10	Klaudia Kaczorowska	20 December 1988	184 cm (6 ft 0 in)	68 kg (150 lb)	303 cm (9 ft 11 in)	281 cm (9 ft 3 in)	Atom Trefl
11	Anna Werblinska	14 May 1984	178 cm (5 ft 10 in)	66 kg (146 lb)	308 cm (10 ft 1 in)	292 cm (9 ft 7 in)	Bank BPS Muszynianka
12	Milena Radecka	18 October 1984	177 cm (5 ft 10 in)	65 kg (143 lb)	302 cm (9 ft 11 in)	295 cm (9 ft 8 in)	Azerrail
13	Paulina Maj	22 March 1987	166 cm (5 ft 5 in)	58 kg (128 lb)	277 cm (9 ft 1 in)	255 cm (8 ft 4 in)	Bank BPS Muszynianka Fakro
14	Ewelina Sieczka	26 January 1988	182 cm (6 ft 0 in)	68 kg (150 lb)	308 cm (10 ft 1 in)	280 cm (9 ft 2 in)	Budowlani
15	Katarzyna Gajgal	21 September 1981	190 cm (6 ft 3 in)	85 kg (187 lb)	300 cm (9 ft 10 in)	287 cm (9 ft 5 in)	Bank BPS Muszynianka
16	Joanna Wolosz	7 April 1990	181 cm (5 ft 11 in)	65 kg (143 lb)	303 cm (9 ft 11 in)	281 cm (9 ft 3 in)	Yamamay Busto Arsizio
17	Joanna Kaczor	16 September 1984	191 cm (6 ft 3 in)	64 kg (141 lb)	305 cm (10 ft 0 in)	290 cm (9 ft 6 in)	Tauron MKS
18	Zuzanna Efimienko	8 August 1989	197 cm (6 ft 6 in)	72 kg (159 lb)	318 cm (10 ft 5 in)	303 cm (9 ft 11 in)	Atom Trefl
19	Maja Tokarska	22 February 1991	193 cm (6 ft 4 in)	72 kg (159 lb)	303 cm (9 ft 11 in)	292 cm (9 ft 7 in)	Atom Trefl

== Puerto Rico ==
The following is the Puerto Rico roster in the 2010 FIVB World Grand Prix.

#	Name	Date of birth	Height	Weight	Spike	Block	Club
1	Debora Seilhamer	4 October 1985	166 cm (5 ft 5 in)	61 kg (134 lb)	245 cm (8 ft 0 in)	240 cm (7 ft 10 in)	Cataño
2	Xaimara Colon	11 September 1988	176 cm (5 ft 9 in)	62 kg (137 lb)	255 cm (8 ft 4 in)	246 cm (8 ft 1 in)	Carolina Gigantes
3	Vilmarie Mojica	13 August 1985	180 cm (5 ft 11 in)	63 kg (139 lb)	295 cm (9 ft 8 in)	288 cm (9 ft 5 in)	Caguas
4	Tatiana Encarnación	28 July 1985	182 cm (6 ft 0 in)	72 kg (159 lb)	300 cm (9 ft 10 in)	279 cm (9 ft 2 in)	Lancheras de Catano
5	Sarai Alvarez	3 April 1986	183 cm (6 ft 0 in)	61 kg (134 lb)	295 cm (9 ft 8 in)	286 cm (9 ft 5 in)	Mayaguez
6	Yarimar Rosa	20 June 1988	178 cm (5 ft 10 in)	62 kg (137 lb)	295 cm (9 ft 8 in)	285 cm (9 ft 4 in)	Mayaguez
7	Stephanie Enright	15 December 1990	179 cm (5 ft 10 in)	56 kg (123 lb)	300 cm (9 ft 10 in)	292 cm (9 ft 7 in)	Caguas
8	Shirley Ferrer	23 June 1991	180 cm (5 ft 11 in)	63 kg (139 lb)	290 cm (9 ft 6 in)	293 cm (9 ft 7 in)	Humacao
9	Aurea Cruz	10 January 1982	180 cm (5 ft 11 in)	63 kg (139 lb)	310 cm (10 ft 2 in)	290 cm (9 ft 6 in)	Carolina
10	Shanon Torregrosa	11 February 1981	188 cm (6 ft 2 in)	85 kg (187 lb)	301 cm (9 ft 11 in)	297 cm (9 ft 9 in)	Catano
11	Karina Ocasio	1 August 1985	192 cm (6 ft 4 in)	76 kg (168 lb)	298 cm (9 ft 9 in)	288 cm (9 ft 5 in)	Caguas
12	Michelle Nogueras	5 December 1988	179 cm (5 ft 10 in)	58 kg (128 lb)	275 cm (9 ft 0 in)	262 cm (8 ft 7 in)	Carolina
13	Raimariely Santos	13 April 1992	180 cm (5 ft 11 in)	68 kg (150 lb)	284 cm (9 ft 4 in)	280 cm (9 ft 2 in)	Leonas de Ponce
14	Glorimar Ortega	21 November 1983	179 cm (5 ft 10 in)	70 kg (150 lb)	297 cm (9 ft 9 in)	285 cm (9 ft 4 in)	Caguas
15	Shara Venegas	18 September 1992	173 cm (5 ft 8 in)	68 kg (150 lb)	280 cm (9 ft 2 in)	272 cm (8 ft 11 in)	Caguas
16	Alexandra Oquendo	3 February 1984	189 cm (6 ft 2 in)	75 kg (165 lb)	297 cm (9 ft 9 in)	284 cm (9 ft 4 in)	Caguas
17	Sheila Ocasio	17 November 1982	195 cm (6 ft 5 in)	74 kg (163 lb)	310 cm (10 ft 2 in)	292 cm (9 ft 7 in)	Juncos
18	Jetzabel Del Valle	19 December 1979	185 cm (6 ft 1 in)	73 kg (161 lb)	305 cm (10 ft 0 in)	292 cm (9 ft 7 in)	Humacao
19	Diana Reyes	29 April 1993	188 cm (6 ft 2 in)	86 kg (190 lb)	290 cm (9 ft 6 in)	285 cm (9 ft 4 in)	Caguas

== Thailand ==
The following is the Thailand roster in the 2010 FIVB World Grand Prix.

#	Name	Date of birth	Height	Weight	Spike	Block	Club
1	Piyanut Pannoy	10 November 1989	171 cm (5 ft 7 in)	68 kg (150 lb)	280 cm (9 ft 2 in)	275 cm (9 ft 0 in)	Supreme VC
2	Anongporn Promrat	2 March 1992	179 cm (5 ft 10 in)	70 kg (150 lb)	260 cm (8 ft 6 in)	254 cm (8 ft 4 in)	Federbrau
3	Rasamee Supamool	10 January 1992	178 cm (5 ft 10 in)	68 kg (150 lb)	285 cm (9 ft 4 in)	276 cm (9 ft 1 in)	Chang
4	Hattaya Bamrungsuk	12 August 1993	178 cm (5 ft 10 in)	62 kg (137 lb)	289 cm (9 ft 6 in)	275 cm (9 ft 0 in)	Chang
5	Pleumjit Thinkaow	9 November 1983	180 cm (5 ft 11 in)	63 kg (139 lb)	298 cm (9 ft 9 in)	281 cm (9 ft 3 in)	Supreme VC
6	Onuma Sittirak	13 June 1986	175 cm (5 ft 9 in)	72 kg (159 lb)	304 cm (10 ft 0 in)	285 cm (9 ft 4 in)	JT Marvelous
7	Patcharee Deesamer	3 February 1989	180 cm (5 ft 11 in)	74 kg (163 lb)	306 cm (10 ft 0 in)	293 cm (9 ft 7 in)	Chang
8	Utaiwan Kaensing	7 September 1988	189 cm (6 ft 2 in)	86 kg (190 lb)	310 cm (10 ft 2 in)	295 cm (9 ft 8 in)	Chang
9	Jurairat Ponleka	6 October 1991	181 cm (5 ft 11 in)	65 kg (143 lb)	290 cm (9 ft 6 in)	280 cm (9 ft 2 in)	Federbrau
10	Wilavan Apinyapong	6 June 1984	174 cm (5 ft 9 in)	68 kg (150 lb)	294 cm (9 ft 8 in)	282 cm (9 ft 3 in)	Supreme VC
11	Amporn Hyapha	19 May 1985	180 cm (5 ft 11 in)	70 kg (150 lb)	301 cm (9 ft 11 in)	290 cm (9 ft 6 in)	Nakhonnon VC
12	Kamonporn Sukmak	29 February 1988	174 cm (5 ft 9 in)	63 kg (139 lb)	285 cm (9 ft 4 in)	275 cm (9 ft 0 in)	Chang
13	Nootsara Tomkom	7 July 1985	169 cm (5 ft 7 in)	57 kg (126 lb)	289 cm (9 ft 6 in)	278 cm (9 ft 1 in)	Rabita Baku
14	Jarasporn Bundasak	1 March 1993	180 cm (5 ft 11 in)	66 kg (146 lb)	280 cm (9 ft 2 in)	290 cm (9 ft 6 in)	Chang
15	Malika Kanthong	8 January 1987	177 cm (5 ft 10 in)	63 kg (139 lb)	292 cm (9 ft 7 in)	278 cm (9 ft 1 in)	Supreme VC
16	Sontaya Keawbundit	9 February 1991	177 cm (5 ft 10 in)	68 kg (150 lb)	290 cm (9 ft 6 in)	280 cm (9 ft 2 in)	Idea Khonkaen VC
17	Wanitchaya Luangtonglang	8 October 1992	175 cm (5 ft 9 in)	51 kg (112 lb)	295 cm (9 ft 8 in)	280 cm (9 ft 2 in)	Chang
18	Em-orn Phanusit	25 March 1988	179 cm (5 ft 10 in)	70 kg (150 lb)	302 cm (9 ft 11 in)	291 cm (9 ft 7 in)	Chang
19	Tapaphaipun Chaisri	29 November 1989	168 cm (5 ft 6 in)	60 kg (130 lb)	295 cm (9 ft 8 in)	276 cm (9 ft 1 in)	Sisaket VC

== United States ==
The following is the United States roster in the 2010 FIVB World Grand Prix.

#	Name	Date of birth	Height	Weight	Spike	Block	Club
1	Ogonna Nnamani	29 July 1983	185 cm (6 ft 1 in)	80 kg (180 lb)	315 cm (10 ft 4 in)	305 cm (10 ft 0 in)	VK Prostejov
2	Alisha Glass	5 April 1988	184 cm (6 ft 0 in)	72 kg (159 lb)	305 cm (10 ft 0 in)	300 cm (9 ft 10 in)	Imoco Volley
3	Christa Harmotto Dietzen	12 October 1986	188 cm (6 ft 2 in)	79 kg (174 lb)	322 cm (10 ft 7 in)	300 cm (9 ft 10 in)	Fenerbahce SK
4	Angela Forsett	6 June 1986	173 cm (5 ft 8 in)	74 kg (163 lb)	320 cm (10 ft 6 in)	315 cm (10 ft 4 in)	Sports Vereingung Schwechat
5	Stacy Sykora	24 June 1977	176 cm (5 ft 9 in)	61 kg (134 lb)	305 cm (10 ft 0 in)	295 cm (9 ft 8 in)	Clube Desportivo Futuro
6	Nicole Davis	24 April 1982	167 cm (5 ft 6 in)	73 kg (161 lb)	284 cm (9 ft 4 in)	266 cm (8 ft 9 in)	E.S. Cannet Rocheville VB
7	Heather Bown	29 November 1978	188 cm (6 ft 2 in)	90 kg (200 lb)	301 cm (9 ft 11 in)	290 cm (9 ft 6 in)	Azerrail Baku
8	Cynthia Barboza	7 February 1987	183 cm (6 ft 0 in)	68 kg (150 lb)	311 cm (10 ft 2 in)	301 cm (9 ft 11 in)	ASD Universal Volley
9	Jennifer Tamas	23 November 1982	191 cm (6 ft 3 in)	82 kg (181 lb)	315 cm (10 ft 4 in)	301 cm (9 ft 11 in)	Azerrail Baku
10	Courtney Thompson	4 November 1984	170 cm (5 ft 7 in)	66 kg (146 lb)	276 cm (9 ft 1 in)	263 cm (8 ft 8 in)	Rio de Janeiro Volei Clube
11	Jordan Larson-Burbach	16 October 1986	188 cm (6 ft 2 in)	75 kg (165 lb)	302 cm (9 ft 11 in)	295 cm (9 ft 8 in)	Eczacibasi Vitra Istanbul
12	Nancy Metcalf	12 November 1978	186 cm (6 ft 1 in)	73 kg (161 lb)	314 cm (10 ft 4 in)	292 cm (9 ft 7 in)	Lokomotiv Baku
13	Lauren Paolini	22 August 1987	193 cm (6 ft 4 in)	73 kg (161 lb)	317 cm (10 ft 5 in)	299 cm (9 ft 10 in)	Hitachi Automotive Systems
14	Nicole Fawcett	16 December 1986	191 cm (6 ft 3 in)	82 kg (181 lb)	310 cm (10 ft 2 in)	291 cm (9 ft 7 in)	Fujian Yango Women's VB Club
15	Logan Tom	25 May 1981	186 cm (6 ft 1 in)	80 kg (180 lb)	306 cm (10 ft 0 in)	297 cm (9 ft 9 in)	Fenerbahce Acibadem
16	Foluke Akinradewo	5 October 1987	191 cm (6 ft 3 in)	79 kg (174 lb)	331 cm (10 ft 10 in)	300 cm (9 ft 10 in)	Volero Zurich
17	Mary Spicer	3 July 1987	175 cm (5 ft 9 in)	65 kg (143 lb)	292 cm (9 ft 7 in)	280 cm (9 ft 2 in)	Rabita Baku
18	Megan Easy	15 October 1988	191 cm (6 ft 3 in)	80 kg (180 lb)	320 cm (10 ft 6 in)	297 cm (9 ft 9 in)	Imoco Volley
19	Destinee Hooker	7 September 1987	193 cm (6 ft 4 in)	73 kg (161 lb)	320 cm (10 ft 6 in)	304 cm (10 ft 0 in)	Osasco Voleibol Clube
