= Jaqueline Carvalho =

Brazilian volleyball player (born 1983)

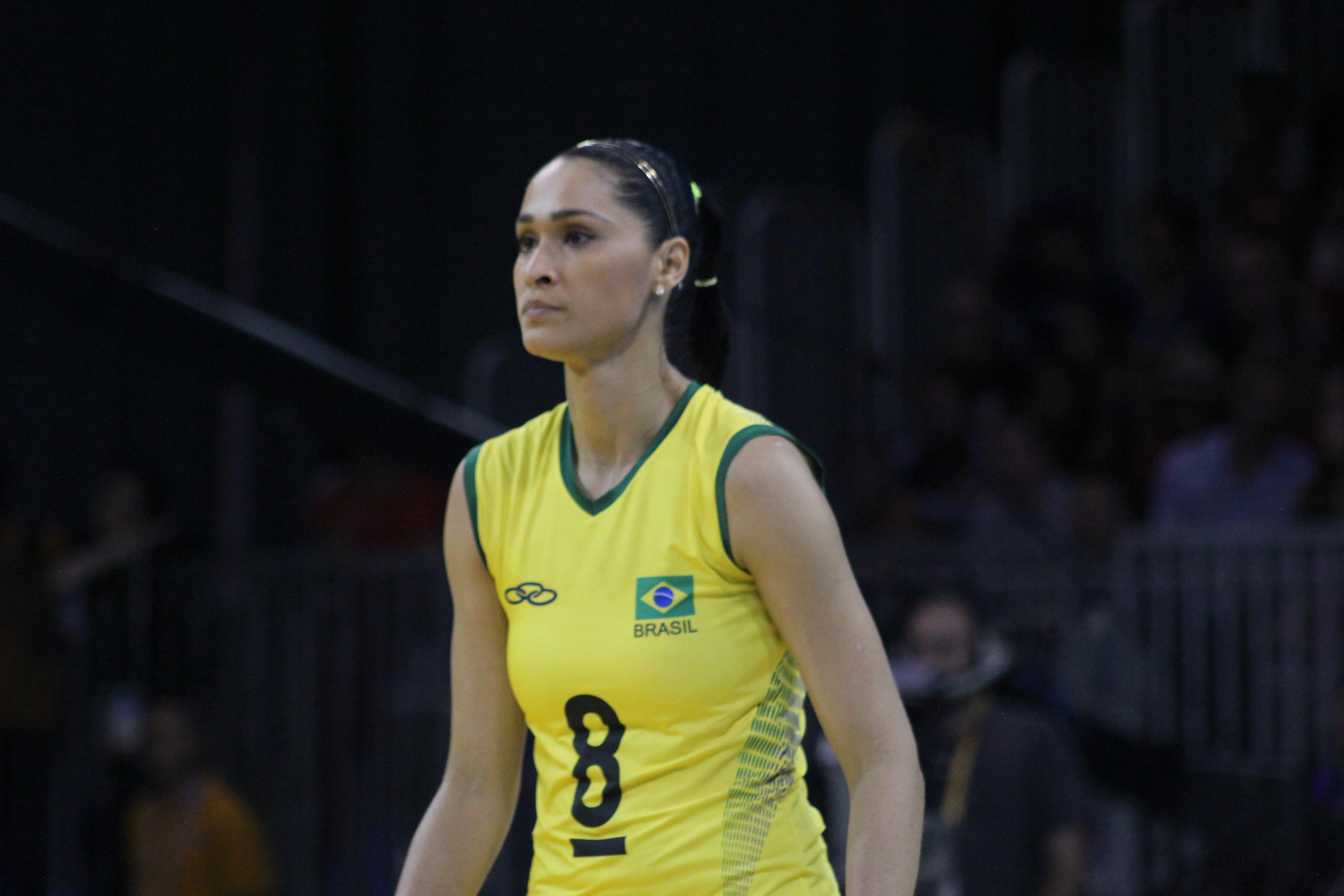

Personal information
- Full name: Jaqueline Maria Pereira de Carvalho Endres
- Nickname: Jaque
- Born: December 31, 1983 (age 42); Recife, Brazil
- Height: 1.86 m (6 ft 1 in)
- Weight: 70 kg (154 lb)
- Spike: 302 cm (119 in)
- Block: 286 cm (113 in)

Volleyball information
- Position: Outside hitter
- Current club: (Brazil) Esporte Clube Pinheiros
- Number: 8

National team
2001–2018	Brazil
Honours
Women's volleyball
Representing Brazil
Olympic Games
Gold medal – first place	2008 Beijing	Team
Gold medal – first place	2012 London	Team
World Championship
Silver medal – second place	2006 Japan	Team
Silver medal – second place	2010 Japan	Team
Bronze medal – third place	2014 Italy	Team
World Cup
Silver medal – second place	2007 Japan	Team
World Grand Champions Cup
Gold medal – first place	2005 Tokyo/Nagoya	Team
Gold medal – first place	2013 Tokyo/Nagoya	Team
World Grand Prix
Gold medal – first place	2005 Sendai	Team
Gold medal – first place	2006 Reggio Calabria	Team
Gold medal – first place	2008 Yokohama	Team
Gold medal – first place	2014 Tokyo	Team
Gold medal – first place	2016 Bangkok	Team
Silver medal – second place	2010 Ningbo	Team
Silver medal – second place	2012 Ningbo	Team
South American Championship
Gold medal – first place	2011 Callao	Team
Pan American Games
Gold medal – first place	2011 Guadalajara	Team
Silver medal – second place	2015 Toronto	Team
- Last updated: April 2019

Jaqueline Maria Pereira de Carvalho Endres (born December 31, 1983) is a Brazilian volleyball player, a member of the Brazilian team that won the Olympic Games at Beijing 2008 and London 2012. She currently plays for the Esporte Clube Pinheiros team.

== Career ==
Raised in the Boa Vista neighborhood of Recife, Jaqueline played both basketball—the sport her sister Juliana played—and volleyball at school. In 1994, at the age of 11, she chose to focus solely on volleyball, as it was becoming difficult to balance both sports with her studies. Competing in school tournaments, she began her career with Sport Club do Recife.

A standout at the club, at age 13 (in 1996), scouts from the city of São Paulo invited her to try out for a club in the city, then known as BCN/Osasco. Jaque passed the BCN/Osasco tryout and consequently had to move from Recife to São Paulo. Shortly thereafter, she was already playing in the senior team.

=== Club ===
Carvalho started her career with Gremio de Volei Osasco in 2002, before moving to Unilever Rio de Janeiro in 2004. In 2006 she moved to play in Europe for Vini Monteschiavo Jesi, later joining Gruppo Murcia 2002 and Scavolini Pesaro.

At the end of 2004, having recovered but lacking match rhythm, Jaqueline transferred to a club in Rio de Janeiro, Rexona/Ades. After one season, she went from being a reserve player due to lack of rhythm to a starting position, earning her call-up to the Brazilian national team in April 2005.

In 2006–07, Jaqueline moved to Italy to play for Monte Schiavo/Jesi. In July 2007, on the eve of the 2007 Pan American Games in Rio de Janeiro, Jaqueline—then a starter for Brazil—tested positive in an anti-doping test. The accusation stemmed from a test conducted during the Italian league finals the previous month. She was provisionally suspended for 60 days.

During hearings, she initially claimed she had consumed a tea for cellulite that contained the banned substance sibutramine. The first ruling imposed a nine-month suspension, which would have kept her out of most 2008 competitions and allowed her return just before the Beijing 2008 Olympics.

On 18 September 2007, after further investigation, Jaqueline changed her defense. She argued that the sibutramine came from a CLA supplement by IntegralMed, prescribed to burn fat. In June (the same month as the positive test), the Brazilian Olympic Committee had been informed that the company Integralmédica S/A had its activities suspended due to product contamination. As Jaqueline was in Italy and unaware of this, she continued using the supplement.

A reassessment reduced her suspension from nine months to three, and since she had already been suspended since July, she was cleared to return to play.

Jaqueline then transferred to Murcia in Spain for the 2007–08 season, where she won the Spanish championship.

Later in 2008, she returned to Italy to play for Scavolini/Pesaro in the 2008–09 season, under coach José Roberto Guimarães. She became Italian champion and was named the best player of the finals. In 2009, she returned to Brazil to play for Sollys/Osasco, where she became a five-time Brazilian champion. She remained in Osasco for three more seasons, winning another national title as team captain in 2011–12 and establishing herself as one of the team’s main players and scorers.

After finishing as runner-up in the Brazilian league in April 2013 with Osasco, Jaqueline announced her pregnancy. Arthur, her son from a 12-year relationship with fellow volleyball player Murilo Endres, was born in December. After his birth, she resumed training with the goal of playing in the final stage of the 2013–14 Women's Brazilian Volleyball Superliga - Série A for Osasco, as agreed after announcing her pregnancy.

However, the club cited team chemistry with newly signed players, beginning a difficult search for a new team. A major obstacle was the athlete ranking system established by the CBV, where each player receives a score (with 7 being the maximum for top players like Jaqueline). Top teams in São Paulo had already reached this limit. Jaqueline and other players protested the system, arguing it forced important athletes abroad, such as Fernanda Garay and Sheilla Castro.

With no club options in the state of São Paulo and wanting to remain in Brazil with her family, Jaqueline accepted an offer from Minas Tênis Clube, where former national teammate Carol Gattaz played.

Carvalho joined Camponesa-Minas for the 2014/15 season, before moving to play for Sesi-SP.

In 2015–16, she was signed by SESI-SP after a strong season with Minas.

She returned to Minas in November 2016.

In 2016–17, she returned to Minas, where alongside Destinee Hooker and Rosamaria Montibeller she helped the team reach another dramatic semifinal, decided only in the final match with a victory by Rio.

In the 2017–18 season, Jaque was a key player in reception, defense, and attack for the team coached by three-time Olympic champion José Roberto Guimarães, Hinode Barueri, finishing as São Paulo state runner-up and 5th place in the Superliga.

After a year away from competition, Jaque signed with Osasco for the 2019–20 season, returning to the club after six years and becoming one of the most talked-about signings of the season. She remained for 2020–21, standing out not only in passing but also in attack, serving as a reliable option for setter Roberta Ratzke. She won the 2020 São Paulo Championship and finished third in the Superliga.

On 20 July 2023, Jaqueline announced her return to the court, signing with Campinas, a new club in the national scene. She played the team's final match in the Campeonato Paulista before financial problems led to its dissolution in October.

Jaque later filed a lawsuit against the club's owners—her former national teammate Tandara Caixeta and her husband Cléber de Oliveira—for unpaid labor rights.

In 2025 she started playing for the Esporte Clube Pinheiros team.

In the 2025-2026 season, Carvalho was part of the Pinheiros squad that got promoted from the Superliga Brasileira de Voleibol Feminino - Série B, the second division of the Brazilian Volleyball Women's Super League, into the Superliga Brasileira de Voleibol Feminino - Série A, the first division of the Brazilian Volleyball Women's Super League.

=== International ===
Carvalho was part of the national team that won the gold medal at the 2011 Pan American Games held in Guadalajara, Mexico. Carvalho and Brazil's national team won the gold medal at the 2012 Summer Olympics in London. On August 24, 2013, she won a fourth gold medal of the World Grand Prix after winning the final match against Japan.

Carvalho won the silver medal at the 2015 Pan American Games when her national team was defeated in the championship match by the United States, 0-3.

== Personal life ==
Carvalho is married to fellow Brazilian volleyball player Murilo Endres, with whom she has a son named Arthur. Carvalho is the aunt of Enzo Endres and Eric Endres, who also play volleyball. She is the sister-in-law of former Brazilian volleyball player Gustavo Endres.

== Clubs ==
- (Brazil) Vôlei Osasco (2002–2004)
- (Brazil) Rexona-Ades (2004–2006)
- (Italy) Vini Monteschiavo Jesi (2006–2007)
- (Spain) Gruppo Murcia (2007–2008)
- (Italy) Scavolini Pesaro (2008–2009)
- (Brazil) Sollys Osasco (2009–2014)
- (Brazil) Minas Tênis Clube (2014–2015)
- (Brazil) SESI-SP (2015–2016)
- (Brazil) Minas Tênis Clube (2016–2017)
- (Brazil) Hinode Barueri (2017–2018)
- (Brazil) Osasco Audax (2019–2021)
- (Brazil) Campinas Vôlei (2023)
- (Brazil) Esporte Clube Pinheiros (2025)

== Awards ==
=== Individuals ===
- 2001 FIVB U20 World Championship – "Most valuable player"
- 2006 FIVB World Championship – "Best receiver"
- 2009 South America Club Championship – "Most valuable player"
- 2009–10 Brazilian Superliga – "Most valuable player"
- 2010 FIVB World Grand Prix – "Best spiker"
- 2011 South America Club Championship – "Most valuable player"
- 2012 South America Club Championship – "Best server"
- 2012 FIVB Club World Championship – "Best receiver"
- 2012–13 Brazilian Superliga – "Best receiver"

=== Clubs ===
- 2002–03 Brazilian Superliga – Champion, with Osasco Vôlei
- 2003–04 Brazilian Superliga – Champion, with Osasco Vôlei
- 2005–06 Brazilian Superliga – Champion, with Rexona Ades
- 2008–09 Italian League – Champion, with Scavolini Pesaro
- 2009–10 Brazilian Superliga – Champion, with Sollys Osasco
- 2011–12 Brazilian Superliga – Champion, with Sollys Osasco
- 2009 South American Club Championship – Champion, with Sollys Osasco
- 2010 South American Club Championship – Champion, with Sollys Osasco
- 2011 South American Club Championship – Champion, with Sollys Osasco
- 2012 South American Club Championship – Champion, with Sollys Nestlé Osasco
- 2012 Club World Championship – Champion, with Sollys Nestlé Osasco
