= Adenízia da Silva =

Brazilian volleyball player (born 1986)

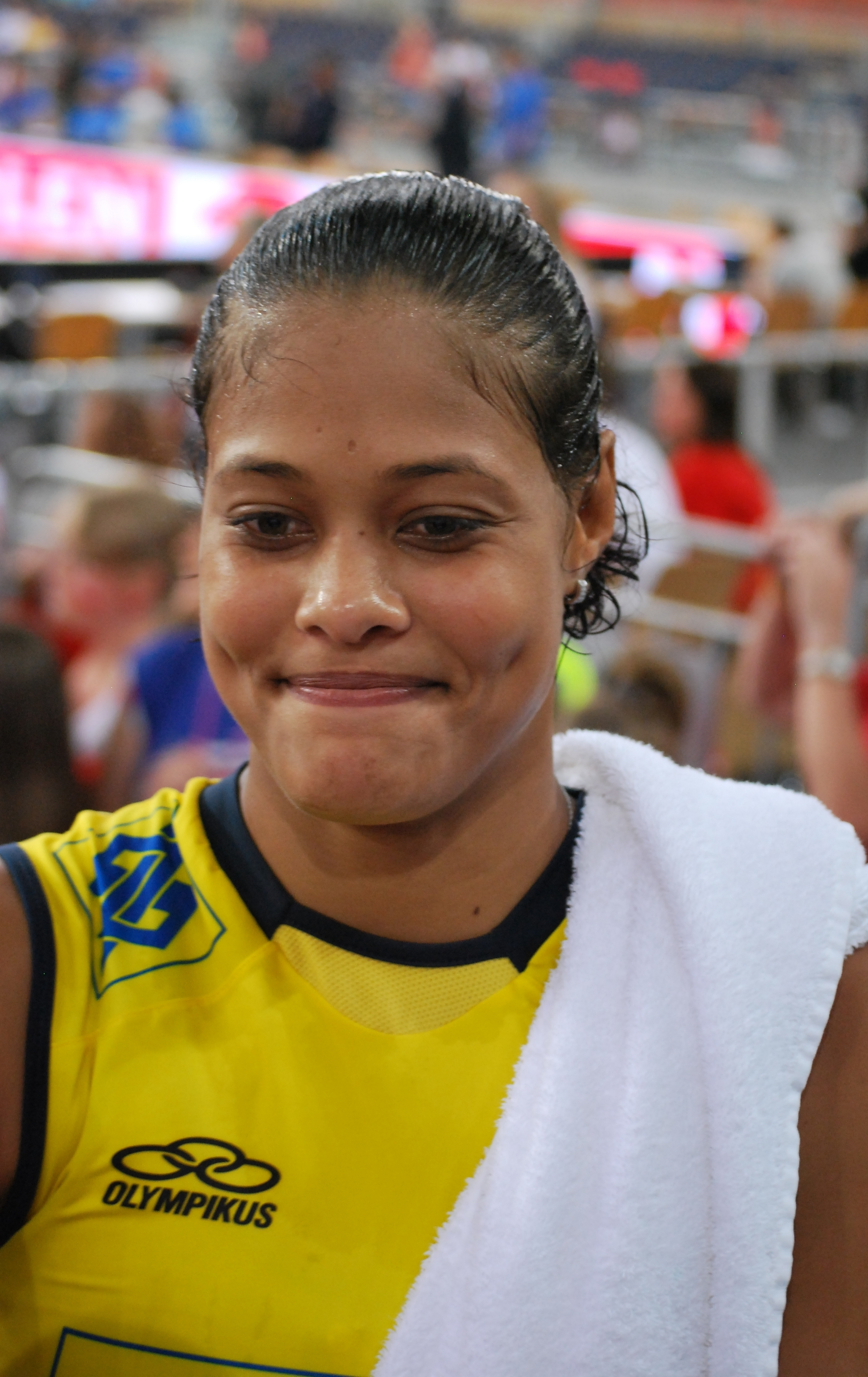

Personal information
- Full name: Adenízia Ferreira da Silva
- Born: December 18, 1986 (age 39) Ibiaí, Brazil
- Home town: Uberlândia
- Height: 1.87 m (6 ft 1 1/2 in)
- Weight: 63 kg (139 lb)
- Spike: 312 cm (123 in)
- Block: 290 cm (110 in)

Volleyball information
- Position: Middle blocker
- Current club: (Brazil) Dentil Praia Clube
- Number: 5

Career
- Years: Team
- 1999–2016 2016–2020 2020–2022 2022–2023 2023–present: (Brazil) Osasco Voleibol Clube (Italy) Pallavolo Scandicci (Brazil) SESI Bauru (Brazil) Osasco São Cristóvão Saúde (Brazil) Dentil Praia Clube

National team
- Years: Team
- 2005–2021: Brazil
Honours
Women's volleyball
Representing Brazil
Olympic Games
Gold medal – first place	2012 London	Team
FIVB World Championship
Silver medal – second place	2010 Japan	Team
Bronze medal – third place	2014 Italy	Team
FIVB World Grand Prix
Gold medal – first place	2009 Tokyo	Team
Gold medal – first place	2013 Sapporo	Team
Gold medal – first place	2014 Tokyo	Team
Gold medal – first place	2016 Bangkok	Team
Gold medal – first place	2017 Nanjing	Team
Silver medal – second place	2010 Ningbo	Team
Silver medal – second place	2011 Macau	Team
Silver medal – second place	2012 Ningbo	Team
World Grand Champions Cup
Gold medal – first place	2013 Japan	Team
Silver medal – second place	2009 Japan	Team
Pan American Games
Silver medal – second place	2015 Toronto	Team
Montreux Volley Masters
Gold medal – first place	2013 Switzerland
Gold medal – first place	2017 Switzerland	Team
South American Championship
Gold medal – first place	2009 Porto Alegre
Gold medal – first place	2011 Callao
Gold medal – first place	2013 Ica
Gold medal – first place	2015 Cartagena
Gold medal – first place	2017 Cali
FIVB Nations League
Silver medal – second place	2021 Rimini	Team
- Updated on December 2025

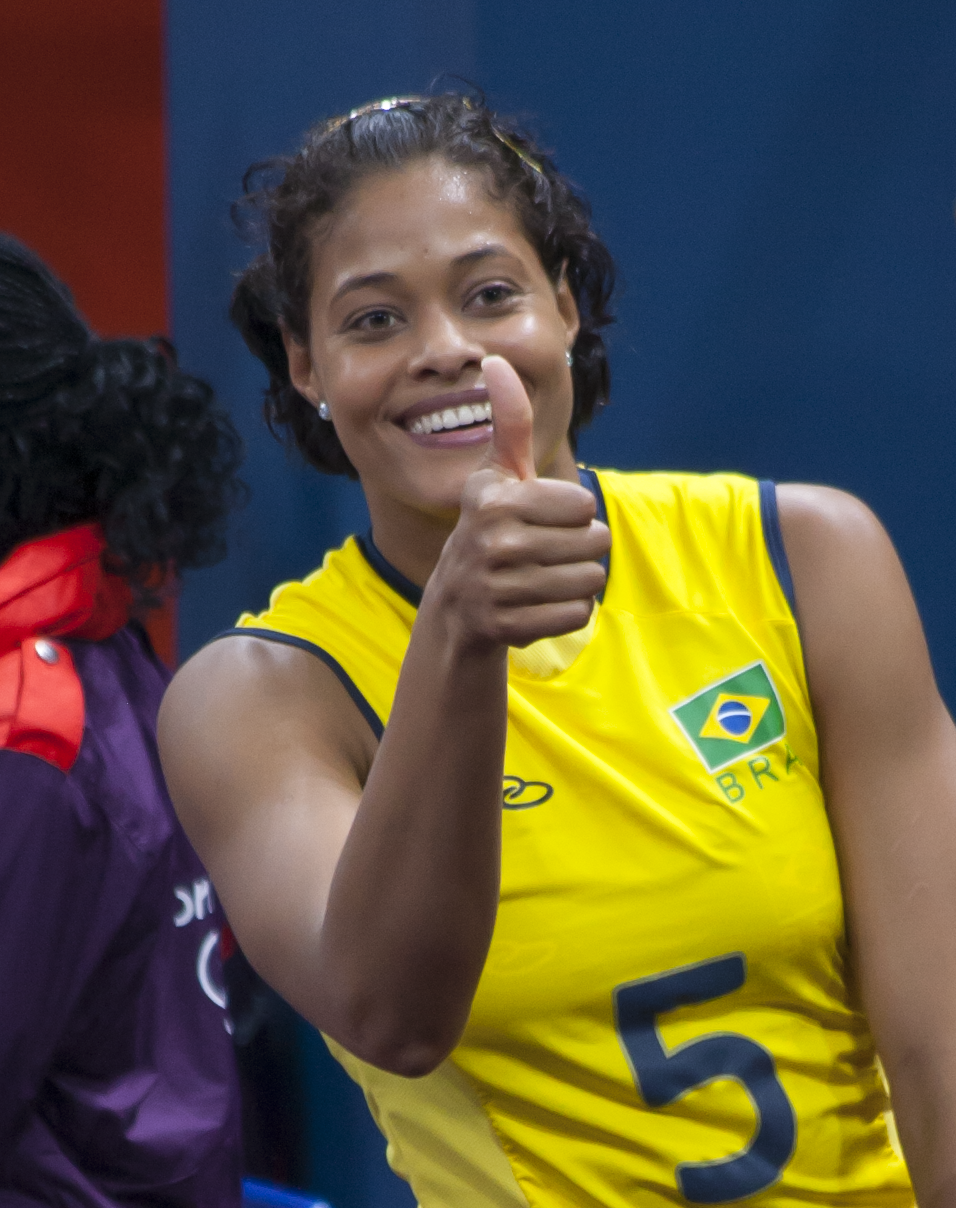
Adenízia at the 2012 London Olympics

Adenízia Aparecida Ferreira da Silva (Brazilian Portuguese: [adeˈnizi.ɐ da ˈsiwvɐ]; born December 18, 1986) is a Brazilian volleyball player who currently plays as a middle blocker for Dentil Praia Clube. She was a champion with Brazil's national team at the 2012 Summer Olympics. Da Silva is widely acclaimed as one of the best middle blockers of her generation.

== Career ==
Da Silva started playing at 11 with the Clube Filadélfia. At the age of 13, she joined Osasco Voleibol Clube.

Da Silva won the bronze medal and the "Best Blocker" at the 2005 Pan-American Cup, held in Santo Domingo, Dominican Republic.

She took the "Best Server" award and the gold medal with her team at the 2009 Final Four Cup held in Lima, Peru.

From 2009 to 2010, she won with Sollys/Osasco the Brazilian Superliga and the 2010 South American Club Championship.

Da Silva won the bronze medal at the 2011 FIVB Women's Club World Championship playing in Doha, Qatar with Sollys/Nestle. She also was awarded as the Best Blocker of the tournament.

Playing with Sollys Nestlé Osasco, Da Silva won the gold medal in the 2012 FIVB Club World Championship held in Doha, Qatar. She was part of the Brazilian team that won the gold medal at the 2012 Summer Olympics.

Da Silva played for her national team, winning the bronze at the 2014 World Championship when her team defeated Italy 3–2 in the bronze medal match.

Da Silva won the Best Blocker award and the silver medal at the 2015 Pan American Games when her national team lost the championship match 0–3 to the United States.

== Awards and honours ==
=== Individuals ===
- 2003 FIVB U18 World Championship – "Best Blocker"
- 2004 U19 South American Championship – "Best Blocker"
- 2005 FIVB U20 World Championship – "Best Blocker"
- 2005 Pan-American Cup – "Best Blocker"
- 2007–08 Brazilian Superliga – "Best Blocker"
- 2009 Final Four Cup – "Best Server"
- 2010 South American Club Championship – "Most Valuable Player"
- 2011 FIVB Club World Championship – "Best Blocker"
- 2011–12 Brazilian Superliga – "Best Blocker"
- 2012 South American Club Championship – "Best Spiker"
- 2014 South American Club Championship – "Best Middle Blocker"
- 2015 Pan American Games – "Best Middle Blocker"
- 2025 FIVB Club World Championship – "Best Blocker"

=== Clubs ===
- 2007–2008 Brazilian Superliga – Runner-up, with Finasa Osasco
- 2008–2009 Brazilian Superliga – Runner-up, with Finasa Osasco
- 2009–2010 Brazilian Superliga – Champion, with Sollys Osasco
- 2010–2011 Brazilian Superliga – Runner-up, with Sollys Osasco
- 2011–2012 Brazilian Superliga – Champion, with Sollys Osasco
- 2012–2013 Brazilian Superliga – Runner-up, with Sollys Osasco
- 2014–2015 Brazilian Superliga – Runner-up, with Molico Osasco
- 2009 South American Club Championship – Champion, with Sollys Osasco
- 2010 South American Club Championship – Champion, with Sollys Osasco
- 2011 South American Club Championship – Champion, with Sollys Osasco
- 2012 South American Club Championship – Champion, with Sollys Nestle
- 2014 South American Club Championship – Runner-up, with Molico Osasco
- 2015 South American Club Championship – Runner-up, with Molico Osasco
- 2010 FIVB Club World Championship – Runner-up, with Sollys Osasco
- 2011 FIVB Club World Championship – Bronze medal, with Sollys Osasco
- 2012 FIVB Club World Championship - Champion, with Sollys Osasco
- 2014 FIVB Club World Championship - Runner-up, with Molico Osasco

Awards
Preceded by (Dominican Republic) Annerys Vargas	Best Blocker of FIVB Club World Championship; 2011	Succeeded by (United States) Jessica Jones
