= Sheilla Castro =

Brazilian former volleyball player

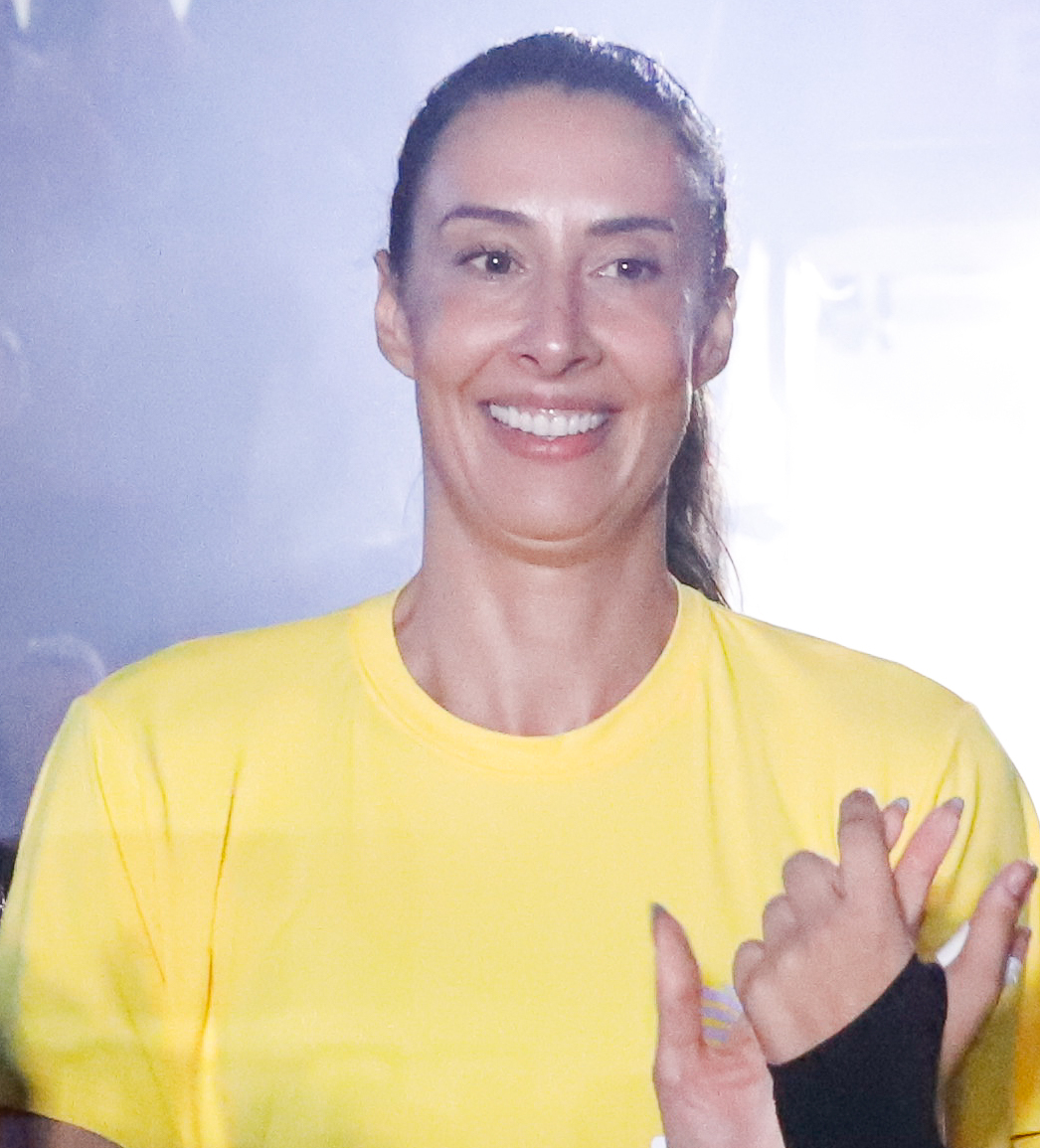
- Castro in 2025

Personal information
- Full name: Sheilla Tavares de Castro
- Born: 1 July 1983 (age 43); Belo Horizonte, Brazil
- Height: 1.85 m (6 ft 1 in)
- Weight: 64 kg (141 lb)
- Spike: 315 cm (124 in)
- Block: 305 cm (120 in)

Volleyball information
- Position: Opposite spiker/Outside hitter

National team
2001–2016 / 2019-2021	Brazil
Honours
Women's volleyball
Representing Brazil
Olympic Games
Gold medal – first place	2008 Beijing	Team
Gold medal – first place	2012 London	Team
FIVB World Championship
Silver medal – second place	2006 Japan	Team
Silver medal – second place	2010 Japan	Team
Bronze medal – third place	2014 Italy	Team
FIVB World Cup
Silver medal – second place	2007 Japan	Team
World Grand Champions Cup
Gold medal – first place	2005 Tokyo/Nagoya	Team
Gold medal – first place	2013 Tokyo/Nagoya	Team
Silver medal – second place	2009 Tokyo/Fukuoka	Team
FIVB World Grand Prix
Gold medal – first place	2005 Sendai	Team
Gold medal – first place	2006 Reggio Calabria	Team
Gold medal – first place	2008 Yokohama	Team
Gold medal – first place	2009 Tokyo	Team
Gold medal – first place	2013 Sapporo	Team
Gold medal – first place	2014 Tokyo	Team
Gold medal – first place	2016 Bangkok	Team
Silver medal – second place	2010 Ningbo	Team
Silver medal – second place	2011 Macau	Team
Silver medal – second place	2012 Ningbo	Team
Pan American Games
Gold medal – first place	2011 Guadalajara	Team
Silver medal – second place	2007 Rio de Janeiro	Team
Pan-American Cup
Gold medal – first place	2006 Puerto Rico	Team
Gold medal – first place	2009 Miami	Team
Gold medal – first place	2011 Ciudad Juárez	Team
Silver medal – second place	2007 Mexico	Team
Silver medal – second place	2008 Mexico	Team
Bronze medal – third place	2005 Dominican Republic	Team
South American Championship
Gold medal – first place	2005 La Paz	Team
Gold medal – first place	2007 Santiago	Team
Gold medal – first place	2009 Porto Alegre	Team
Gold medal – first place	2011 Lima	Team
Gold medal – first place	2013 Ica	Team
Gold medal – first place	2015 Cartagena	Team
Gold medal – first place	2019 Cajamarca	Team
Final Four Cup
Gold medal – first place	2008 Fortaleza
Gold medal – first place	2009 Lima
Montreux Volley Masters
Gold medal – first place	2005 Switzerland
Gold medal – first place	2006 Switzerland
Gold medal – first place	2009 Switzerland
FIVB Nations League
Silver medal – second place	2021 Rimini	Team

Sheilla Tavares de Castro (born 1 July 1983) is a Brazilian former volleyball player who specialized as an opposite spiker. Representing Brazil's national team, she has won the gold medal at the 2008 and 2012 Summer Olympics. She also played at the 2016 edition, when Brazil placed fifth.

== Career ==
Castro played as opposite in the Brazilian national team and with Molico/Osasco. She made her debut for the national team against Colombia.

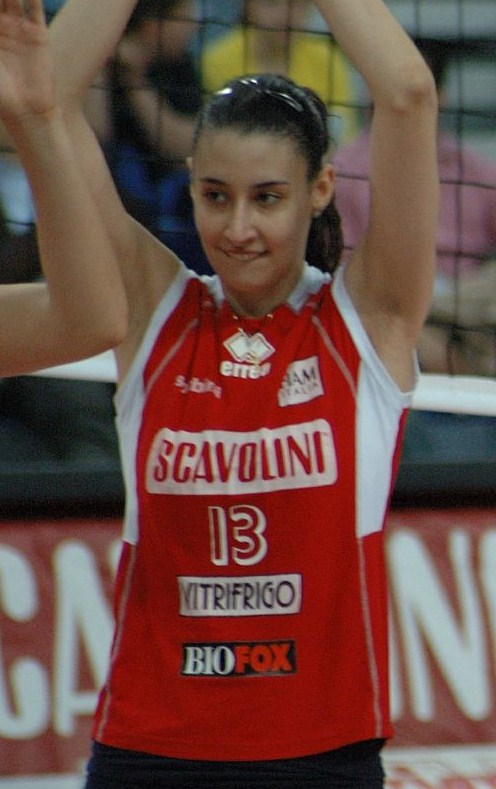
Sheilla Castro in April 2006

Castro was named "Most valuable player" at the 2006 FIVB World Grand Prix in Reggio Calabria, Italy, and at the 2009 FIVB World Grand Prix in Tokyo, Japan, with Brazil winning the gold medal both times.

At the 2007 Pan American Games, Castro won the silver medal alongside fellow players of the national team.

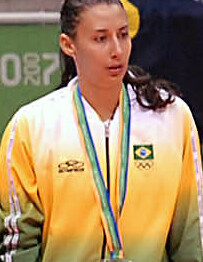
Castro at the 2007 Pan American Games.

At the 2011 Pan-American Cup, Castro was given the "Most valuable player" award, also winning the gold medal with her national team.

Castro was part of the national team who won the gold medal at the 2011 Pan American Games held in Guadalajara, Mexico.

Playing with Sollys Nestlé Osasco, Castro won the gold medal and the "Most valuable player" and "Best scorer" awards in the 2012 FIVB Club World Championship held in Doha, Qatar.

Castro won the "Best opposite" award and the gold medal with her National Team in the 2013 South American Championship held in Ica, Peru. Castro won the silver medal in the 2014 FIVB Club World Championship after her club lost 0–3 to the Russian Dinamo Kazan in the championship match.

Castro played with her national team, winning the bronze at the 2014 World Championship when her team defeated Italy 3–2 in the bronze medal match. She won the Best Opposite Spiker in the 2016 FIVB World Grand Prix.

After finishing the 2016 Olympic Games in 5th place, Castro announced her retirement from the national team. In 2019, without playing for three years even for clubs, she decided to return to the national team and played the 2019 FIVB World Cup and the 2019 South American Championship.

Castro retired in April 2022.

== Clubs ==
- (Brazil) Mackenzie Esporte Clube (1997–)
- (Brazil) MRV/Minas (2001–2004)
- (Italy) Scavolini Pesaro (2004–2008)
- (Brazil) São Caetano/Blausiegel (2008–2010)
- (Brazil) Unilever/Rio de Janeiro (2010–2012)
- (Brazil) Molico Osasco (2012–2014)
- (Turkey) Vakıfbank Istanbul (2014–2016)
- (Brazil) Minas Tênis Clube (2019–2020)
- (United States) Athletes Unlimited Volleyball (2020–2022)

== Awards ==
=== Individuals ===
- 2005 FIVB World Grand Champions Cup – "Most valuable player"
- 2005 FIVB World Grand Champions Cup – "Best scorer"
- 2005–06 CEV Cup – "Best spiker"
- 2006 FIVB World Grand Prix – "Most valuable player"
- 2008–09 Brazilian Superleague – "Best scorer"
- 2008–09 Brazilian Superleague – "Best spiker"
- 2009 FIVB World Grand Prix – "Most valuable player"
- 2009–10 Brazilian Superliga – "Best spiker"
- 2009–10 Brazilian Superliga – "Best server"
- 2011 Pan-American Cup – "Most valuable player"
- 2011 South American Championship – "Most valuable player"
- 2012 Summer Olympics – "Best server"
- 2012 South American Club Championship – "Most valuable player"
- 2012 FIVB Club World Championship – "Best Most Valuable Player"
- 2012 FIVB Club World Championship – "Best scorer"
- 2013 South American Championship – "Best Opposite Spiker"
- 2014 FIVB World Grand Prix – "Best opposite spiker"
- 2014 FIVB World Championship – "Best opposite spiker"
- 2016 FIVB World Grand Prix – "Best outside spiker"
- 2022 Athletes Unlimited "Best opposite hitter"

=== Clubs ===
- 2001–02 Brazilian Superliga – Champion, with Minas
- 2007–08 Italian League – Champion, with Scavolini Pesaro
- 2010–11 Brazilian Superliga – Champion, with Unilever Vôlei
- 2014–15 Turkish League – Runner-up, with Vakıfbank Istanbul
- 2015–16 Turkish League – Champion, with Vakıfbank Istanbul
- 2012 South American Club Championship – Champion, with Molico Osasco
- 2014 South American Club Championship – Runner-up, with Molico Osasco
- 2020 South American Club Championship – Champion, with Itambé/Minas
- 2007–08 CEV Cup – Champion, with Scavolini Pesaro
- 2014–15 CEV Champions League – Bronze medal, with Vakıfbank Istanbul
- 2015–16 CEV Champions League – Runner-up, with Vakıfbank Istanbul
- 2012 FIVB Club World Championship - Champion, with Sollys Nestlé Osasco
- 2014 FIVB Club World Championship - Runner-Up, with Molico Osasco

Awards
Preceded by (Brazil) Paula Pequeno (Brazil) Marianne Steinbrecher	Most Valuable Player of FIVB World Grand Prix; 2006; 2009	Succeeded by (Netherlands) Manon Flier (United States) Foluke Akinradewo
Preceded by (Croatia) Nataša Osmokrović	Most Valuable Player of FIVB Club World Championship; 2012	Succeeded by (Serbia) Jovana Brakočević
Preceded by (Croatia) Nataša Osmokrović	Best Scorer of FIVB Club World Championship; 2012	Succeeded by Not awarded
Preceded by Fabiana Murer	Brazilian Sportswomen of the Year; 2012	Succeeded by Poliana Okimoto
Preceded by (Serbia) Jovana Brakočević	Best Opposite Spiker of FIVB World Grand Prix; 2014	Succeeded by (Russia) Nataliya Goncharova
Preceded by (Brazil) Natália Pereira (United States) Kelsey Robinson	Best Outside Hitter of FIVB World Grand Prix; 2016 ex aequo (United States) Kimberly Hill	Succeeded by (China) Zhu Ting (Brazil) Natália Pereira
