= 2012 Women's South American Volleyball Club Championship =

Tournament details
- Host country: Brazil
- Dates: 4–6 September 2012
- Teams: 4
- Venue: 1 (in Osasco host cities)

Final positions
- Champions: (Brazil) Sollys/Osasco (4th title)

Tournament awards
- MVP: (Brazil) Sheilla Castro (Sollys/Osasco)

The 2012 Women's South American Volleyball Club Championship was the fourth official edition of the women's volleyball tournament, played by four teams over 4–6 September 2012 in Osasco, Brazil. The winning team qualified for the 2012 FIVB Women's Club World Championship.

== Competing clubs ==
Clubs

(Brazil) Sollys/Osasco
(Argentina) Boca Juniors
(Bolivia) Universidad Católica
(Paraguay) Sport Club Venezuela
(Peru) ~~Universidad San Martín~~ (withdrew)

== Round-Robin ==
The competition system for the tournament was a single Round-Robin system. Each team plays once against each of the 3 remaining teams. Points are accumulated during the whole tournament, and the final ranking is determined by the total points gained.

Pos	Team	Pld	W	L	Pts	SW	SL	SR	SPW	SPL	SPR
1	(Brazil) Sollys/Osasco	3	3	0	6	9	0	MAX	225	100	2.250
2	(Argentina) Boca Juniors	3	2	1	5	6	3	2.000	192	134	1.433
3	(Bolivia) Universidad Católica	3	1	2	4	3	7	0.429	164	225	0.729
4	(Paraguay) Sport Club Venezuela	3	0	3	3	1	9	0.111	129	251	0.514

=== Matches ===
Date		Score		Set 1	Set 2	Set 3	Set 4	Set 5	Total
4 Sep	Boca Juniors (Argentina)	3–0	(Bolivia) Universidad Católica	25–9	25–12	25–11			75–32
4 Sep	Sollys/Osasco (Brazil)	3–0	(Paraguay) Sport Club Venezuela	25–11	25–6	25–10			75–27
5 Sep	Sport Club Venezuela (Paraguay)	0–3	(Argentina) Boca Juniors	9–25	11–25	8–25			27–75
5 Sep	Sollys/Osasco (Brazil)	3–0	(Bolivia) Universidad Católica	25–6	25–12	25–13			75–31
6 Sep	Universidad Católica (Bolivia)	3–1	(Paraguay) Sport Club Venezuela	26–28	25–22	25–13	25–12		101–75
6 Sep	Sollys/Osasco (Brazil)	3–0	(Argentina) Boca Juniors	25–15	25–18	25–9			75–42

== Final standing ==
Rank	Team
1st place, gold medalist(s)	(Brazil) Sollys/Osasco
2nd place, silver medalist(s)	(Argentina) Boca Juniors
3rd place, bronze medalist(s)	(Bolivia) Universidad Católica
4	(Paraguay) Sport Club Venezuela

Qualified for the 2012 FIVB Women's Club World Championship

2012 Women's South American Volleyball Club Champions

== Individual awards ==
- Most valuable player
  - (Brazil) Sheilla Castro (Sollys/Osasco)
- Best spiker
  - (Brazil) Adenízia da Silva (Sollys/Osasco)
- Best blocker
  - (Brazil) Thaisa Menezes (Sollys/Osasco)
- Best server
  - (Brazil) Jaqueline Carvalho (Sollys/Osasco)
- Best digger
  - (Argentina) Carolina Hartmann (Sollys/Osasco)
- Best setter
  - (Brazil) Fabiola de Souza (Sollys/Osasco)
- Best receiver
  - (Brazil) Fernanda Garay (Sollys/Osasco)
- Best libero
  - (Brazil) Camila Brait (Sollys/Osasco)
