= 2012 FIVB Volleyball Women's Club World Championship =

2012 Women's Club World Championship
Tournament details
- Host country: Qatar
- Dates: October 13 – 19
- Teams: 6
- Venue: Aspire Ladies Hall (in Doha host cities)

Final positions
- Champions: (Brazil) Sollys Nestlé Osasco (1st title)

Tournament awards
- MVP: (Brazil) Sheilla Castro (Sollys Nestlé Osasco)

The 2012 FIVB Women's Club World Championship was the sixth edition of the – since 2010 – annual event. It was held in Doha, Qatar from October 13 to 19, 2012.

== Qualification ==
Team	Qualified as
Kenya Prisons	2012 African Champions
(China) Bohai Bank Tianjin	2012 Asian Champions
(Puerto Rico) Lancheras de Cataño	2012 NORCECA Representatives
(Brazil) Sollys Nestlé Osasco	2012 South American Champions
(Turkey) Fenerbahçe	2012 European Champions
(Azerbaijan) Rabita Baku	Wild Card (2011 Club World Champions)

== Pools composition ==
Pool A	Pool B
(Azerbaijan) Rabita Baku (China) Bohai Bank Tianjin (Brazil) Sollys Nestlé Osasco	(Turkey) Fenerbahçe (Puerto Rico) Lancheras de Cataño; Kenya Prisons

== Venue ==
All matches
(Qatar) Doha
Aspire Dome
Capacity: 15,500

== Pool standing procedure ==
Match won 3–0 or 3–1: 3 points for the winner, 0 points for the loser
Match won 3–2: 2 points for the winner, 1 point for the loser
In case of tie, the teams will be classified according to the following criteria:
number of matches won, sets ratio and points ratio

== Preliminary round ==
- All times are Arabia Standard Time (UTC+3).

=== Pool A ===
Pos	Team	Pld	W	L	Pts	SW	SL	SR	SPW	SPL	SPR	Qualification
1	(Brazil) Sollys Nestlé Osasco	2	2	0	6	6	1	6.000	172	131	1.313	Semifinals
2	(Azerbaijan) Rabita Baku	2	1	1	3	4	4	1.000	177	185	0.957	Semifinals
3	(China) Bohai Bank Tianjin	2	0	2	0	1	6	0.167	135	168	0.804	

Date	Time		Score		Set 1	Set 2	Set 3	Set 4	Set 5	Total	Report
Oct 14	10:00	Sollys Nestlé Osasco (Brazil)	3–0	(China) Bohai Bank Tianjin	25–13	25–14	25–20			75–47	P2 P3
Oct 15	15:00	Rabita Baku (Azerbaijan)	1–3	(Brazil) Sollys Nestlé Osasco	25–22	20–25	19–25	20–25		84–97	P2 P3
Oct 16	17:00	Rabita Baku (Azerbaijan)	3–1	(China) Bohai Bank Tianjin	25–20	25–22	18–25	25–21		93–88	P2 P3

=== Pool B ===
Pos	Team	Pld	W	L	Pts	SW	SL	SR	SPW	SPL	SPR	Qualification
1	(Turkey) Fenerbahçe	2	2	0	6	6	0	MAX	150	89	1.685	Semifinals
2	(Puerto Rico) Lancheras de Cataño	2	1	1	3	3	4	0.750	145	161	0.901	Semifinals
3	Kenya Prisons	2	0	2	0	1	6	0.167	128	173	0.740	

Date	Time		Score		Set 1	Set 2	Set 3	Set 4	Set 5	Total	Report
Oct 13	10:00	Kenya Prisons	1–3	(Puerto Rico) Lancheras de Cataño	19–25	25–23	19–25	23–25		86–98	P2 P3
Oct 15	17:00	Fenerbahçe (Turkey)	3–0	(Puerto Rico) Lancheras de Cataño	25–17	25–17	25–13			75–47	P2 P3
Oct 17	17:00	Fenerbahçe (Turkey)	3–0	Kenya Prisons	25–14	25–17	25–11			75–42	P2 P3

== Final round ==
- All times are Arabia Standard Time (UTC+3).

=== Bracket ===
Semifinals
October 18 – Doha
(Brazil) Sollys Nestlé Osasco	3
(Puerto Rico) Lancheras de Cataño	0
October 18 – Doha
(Turkey) Fenerbahçe	0
(Azerbaijan) Rabita Baku	3

Final
October 19 – Doha
(Brazil) Sollys Nestlé Osasco	3
(Azerbaijan) Rabita Baku	0
3rd place
October 19 – Doha
(Puerto Rico) Lancheras de Cataño	0
(Turkey) Fenerbahçe	3

=== Semifinals ===
Date	Time		Score		Set 1	Set 2	Set 3	Set 4	Set 5	Total	Report
Oct 18	10:00	Sollys Nestlé Osasco (Brazil)	3–0	(Puerto Rico) Lancheras de Cataño	25–15	25–13	25–15			75–43	P2 P3
Oct 18	17:00	Fenerbahçe (Turkey)	0–3	(Azerbaijan) Rabita Baku	18–25	20–25	16–25			54–75	P2 P3

=== 3rd place ===
Date	Time		Score		Set 1	Set 2	Set 3	Set 4	Set 5	Total	Report
Oct 19	10:00	Lancheras de Cataño (Puerto Rico)	0–3	(Turkey) Fenerbahçe	16–25	17–25	17–25			50–75	P2 P3

=== Final ===
Date	Time		Score		Set 1	Set 2	Set 3	Set 4	Set 5	Total	Report
Oct 19	17:00	Sollys Nestlé Osasco (Brazil)	3–0	(Azerbaijan) Rabita Baku	25–16	25–14	25–17			75–47	P2 P3

== Final standing ==
Rank	Team
1st place, gold medalist(s)	(Brazil) Sollys Nestlé Osasco
2nd place, silver medalist(s)	(Azerbaijan) Rabita Baku
3rd place, bronze medalist(s)	(Turkey) Fenerbahçe
4	(Puerto Rico) Lancheras de Cataño
5	(China) Bohai Bank Tianjin
5	Kenya Prisons

2012 Women's Club World Champions

1st title

Team roster
Ivna, Samara, Adenízia, Thaísa, Karine, Jaque (c), Gabriella, Sheilla, Fabíola, Daniele, Fe Garay, Brait
Head coach
Moura

== Awards ==
- MVP: (Brazil) Sheilla Castro (Sollys Nestlé Osasco)
- Best scorer: (Brazil) Sheilla Castro (Sollys Nestlé Osasco)
- Best spiker: (Brazil) Thaísa Menezes (Sollys Nestlé Osasco)
- Best blocker: (United States) Jessica Jones (Lancheras de Cataño)
- Best server: (Germany) Angelina Grün-Hübner (Rabita Baku)
- Best setter: (Turkey) Elif Ağca (Fenerbahçe)
- Best receiver: (Brazil) Jaqueline Carvalho (Sollys Nestlé Osasco)
- Best libero: (Brazil) Camila Brait (Sollys Nestlé Osasco)
