= Fabíola de Souza =

Brazilian volleyball player (born 1983)

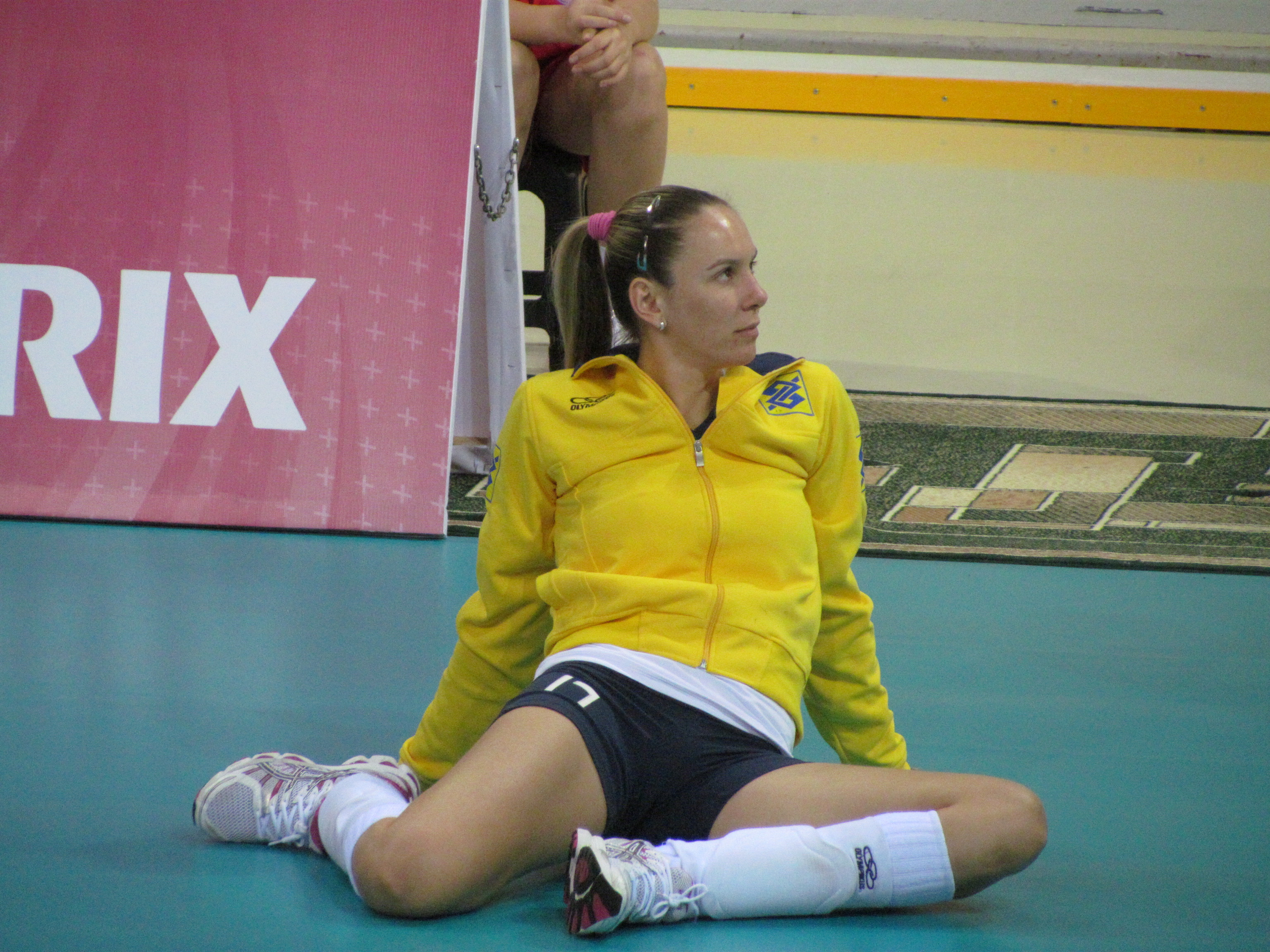

Personal information
- Full name: Josefa Fabiola Almeida de Souza Alves
- Born: 3 February 1983 (age 43); Brasília, Distrito Federal, Brazil
- Height: 184 cm (6 ft 0 in)
- Weight: 70 kg (154 lb)
- Spike: 300 cm (118 in)
- Block: 285 cm (112 in)

Volleyball information
- Position: Setter
- Current club: (Brazil) SESC–RJ

National team
2003–2016	Brazil
Honours
Women's volleyball
Representing Brazil
World Championship
Bronze medal – third place	2014 Italy	Team
World Cup
Silver medal – second place	2007 Japan	Team
World Grand Champions Cup
Gold medal – first place	2013 Japan	Team
World Grand Prix
Gold medal – first place	2014 Tokyo	Team
Silver medal – second place	2010 Ningbo	Team
Silver medal – second place	2011 Macau	Team
Silver medal – second place	2012 Ningbo	Team
Pan American Games
Gold medal – first place	2011 Guadalajara	Team
South American Championship
Gold medal – first place	2007 Santiago
Gold medal – first place	2011 Callao
Gold medal – first place	2013 Ica

Josefa Fabíola Almeida de Souza Alves (born 3 February 1983) is a Brazilian professional volleyball player who won the bronze medal at the 2014 World Championship playing with the Brazil national team.

== Career ==
De Souza claimed the silver medal in the 2014 FIVB Club World Championship, playing with Molico Osasco, when her team lost 0-3 to the Russian Dinamo Kazan the championship match. She was named among the championship Best Team as Best Setter.

De Souza played with her national team, winning the bronze at the 2014 World Championship when her team defeated Italy 3-2 in the bronze medal match.

After signing with the Russian club Dinamo Krasnodar for the 2014/2015 she won the 2015 FIVB Club World Championship silver medal when her team lost to the Turkish Eczacibasi VitrA in the championship match. She was recognized with the Best Setter individual award.

== Clubs ==
- (Brazil) Paraná Vôlei Clube (2000–2001)
- (Brazil) Minas Tênis Clube (2001–2004)
- (Brazil) São Caetano (2004–2005)
- (Brazil) A.D. Brusque (2007–2009)
- (Brazil) Esporte Clube Pinheiros (2009–2011)
- (Brazil) Osasco Voleibol Clube (2011–2014)
- (Russia) Dinamo Krasnodar (2014–2015)
- (Switzerland) Volero Zurich (2015–2017)
- (Brazil) Osasco Voleibol Clube (2017–2018)
- (Brazil) SESI Vôlei Bauru (2018–2019)
- (Brazil) Sesc Rio (2019–2021)
- (Brazil) Osasco Voleibol Clube (2021–2022)
- (Poland) KPS Chemik Police (2022–2023)
- (Brazil) Campinas Vôlei (2023)
- (Brazil) Renasce Vôlei Sorocaba (2023)

== Awards ==
=== Individual ===
- 2011–12 Brazilian Superliga – "Best Setter"
- 2012 South American Club Championship – "Best Setter"
- 2012–13 Brazilian Superliga – "Best Setter"
- 2014 Russian Cup – "Most Valuable Player"
- 2014 Russian Cup – "Best Setter"
- 2014 FIVB Club World Championship – "Best Setter"
- 2015 FIVB Club World Championship – "Best Setter"

=== Clubs ===
- 2012 FIVB Club World Championship – Champion, with Sollys Nestlé Osasco
- 2014 FIVB Club World Championship – Runner-up, with Molico Osasco
- 2015 FIVB Club World Championship – Runner-up, with Dinamo Krasnodar
