= Ana Paula Borgo =

Brazilian volleyball player (1993–2023)

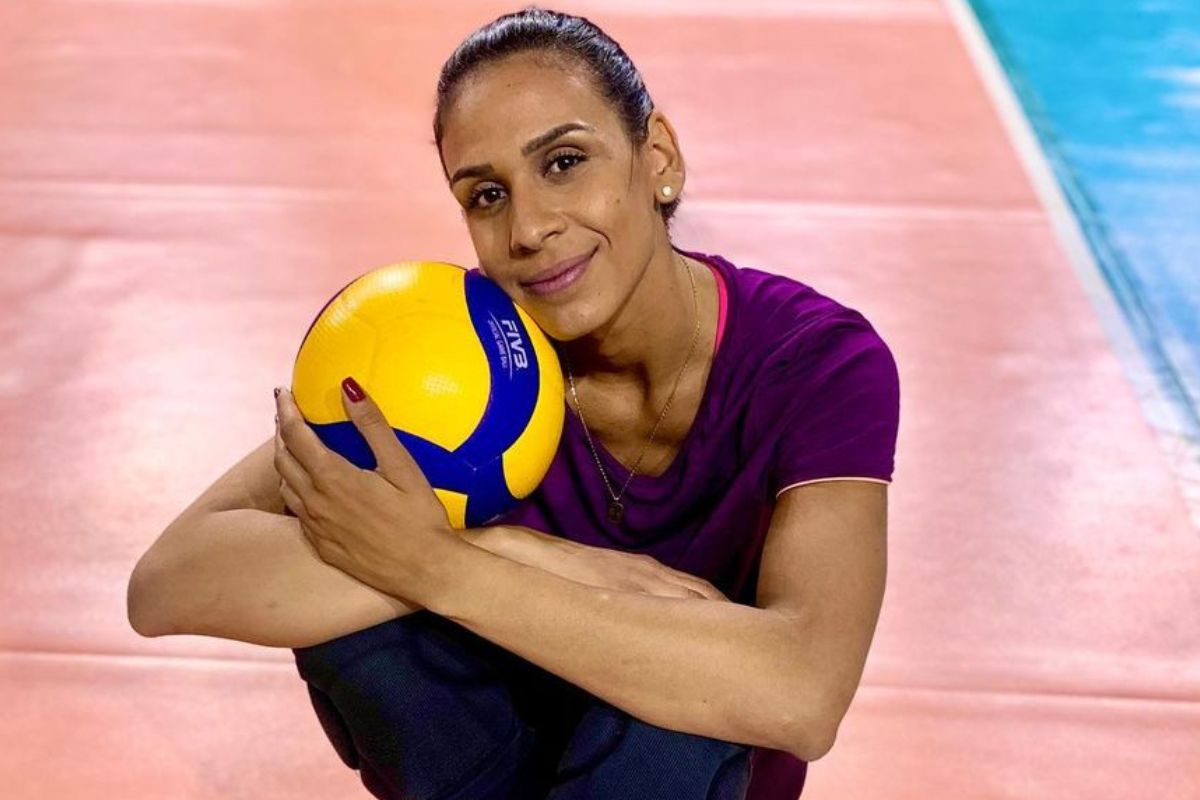
- Paula Borgo in 2022

Personal information
- Full name: Ana Paula Borgo Bedani da Cruz
- Born: 20 October 1993; Bauru, São Paulo, Brazil
- Died: 11 May 2023 (aged 29)
- Height: 1.87 m (6 ft 2 in)
- Weight: 76 kg (168 lb)
- Spike: 304 cm (120 in)
- Block: 290 cm (114 in)

Volleyball information
- Position: Opposite spiker
- Current club: Kale 1957 Spor
- Number: 8

National team
2019	Brazil
Honours
Women's volleyball
Representing Brazil
Nations League
Silver medal – second place	2019 Nanjing	Team
South American Championship
Gold medal – first place	2019 Cajamarca
- Last updated: 10 June 2020

Ana Paula Borgo (20 October 1993 – 11 May 2023) was a Brazilian indoor volleyball player. She was a member of the Brazil women's national volleyball team.

Borgo participated at the 2015 FIVB Volleyball Women's U23 World Championship. and 2019 FIVB Volleyball Women's Nations League.

== Personal life ==
Borgo was married for five years to Carlos Guedes. She was a member of the Universal Church of the Kingdom of God, where she was a worker.

== Death ==
Borgo died on 11 May 2023, at the age of 29, from stomach cancer that was discovered in September 2022.

== Clubs ==
- São Caetano (2011–2015)
- EC Pinheiros (2015–2016)
- Finasa/Osasco (2016–2018)
- Praia Clube (2018–2019)
- Fluminense FC (2019–2020)
- Kale 1957 Spor (2020–2021)
- Volley Bergamo (2021–2022)

== Awards ==
=== Individuals ===
- 2014 U22 South American Championship – "Best Opposite Spiker"

=== Clubs ===
- 2018–19 Brazilian Superliga – Runner-up, with Dentil/Praia Clube
- 2019 South American Club Championship – Runner-up, with Dentil/Praia Clube
