= Saraelen Lima =

Brazilian volleyball player (born 1994)

Personal information
- Full name: Saraelen Leandro Ferreira Lima
- Nationality: Brazilian
- Born: 16 April 1994 (age 32); Goiânia, Goiás
- Height: 1.84 m (6 ft 0 in)
- Weight: 76 kg (168 lb)
- Spike: 302 cm (119 in)
- Block: 282 cm (111 in)

Volleyball information
- Position: Middle Blocker
- Current club: EC Pinheiros
- Number: 21

National team
| 2017 | Brazil |
Honours
Women's volleyball
Representing Brazil
World Grand Champions Cup
| Silver medal – second place | 2017 Japan | Team |

Saraelen Leandro Ferreira Lima (born 16 April 1994) is a Brazilian indoor volleyball player. She is a current member of the Brazil women's national volleyball team.

== Career ==
She competed at the 2015 FIVB U23 World Championship, 2016 Montreux Volley Masters, 2017 FIVB Volleyball Women's World Grand Champions Cup, and 2017 FIVB Volleyball Women's Club World Championship.

== Clubs ==
- (Brazil) EC Pinheiros (2010–2014)
- (Brazil) São Caetano (2014–2015)
- (Brazil) Nestlé Osasco (2015–2017)
- (Brazil) Hinode Barueri (2017–2018)
- (Brazil) Vôlei Bauru (2018–2019)
- (Brazil) EC Pinheiros (2019–)
