= Ewelina Brzezińska =

Polish volleyball player (born 1988)

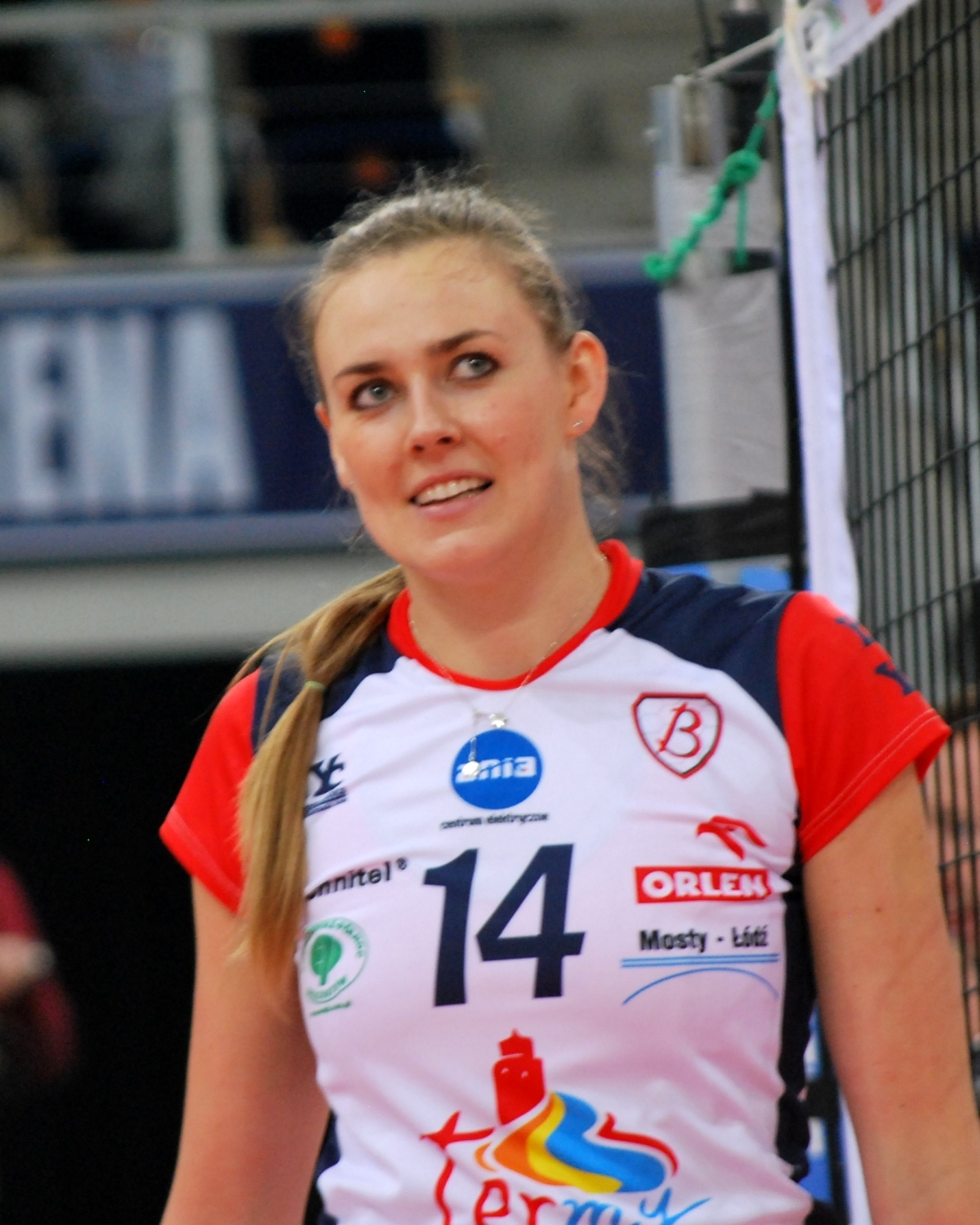

Personal information
- Full name: Ewelina Weronika Brzezinska
- Nationality: Polish
- Born: Ewelina Sieczka; 26 January 1988 (age 38)
- Height: 1.82 m (6 ft 0 in)
- Weight: 68 kg (150 lb)
- Spike: 308 cm (121 in)
- Block: 280 cm (110 in)

Volleyball information
- Number: 9

Career
Teams
	(Poland)

National team
Poland

Ewelina Weronika Brzezińska (born Ewelina Sieczka, 26 January 1988 in Sosnowiec) is a Polish volleyball player, a member of Poland women's national volleyball team.

She participated in the 2013 FIVB World Grand Prix.

From the 2017/2018 season, she plays for the Trefl Proxima Kraków team [1].

== Clubs ==
- (Poland) Polska MKS Dąbrowa Górnicza
- 2010-2012 (Poland) Atom Trefl Sopot
- 2012-2013 (Poland) BKS Aluprof Bielsko-Biała
- 2013-2014 (Poland) Impel Wrocław
- 2014-2016 (Poland) Budowlani Łódź
- 2016-2017 (Poland) BKS Profi Credit Bielsko-Biała
- 2017-2018 (Poland) Trefl Proxima Kraków
