= 2011 Women's South American Volleyball Club Championship =

Tournament details
- Host country: Brazil
- Dates: August 5–7, 2011
- Teams: 4
- Venue: José Liberatti Gymnassium (in Osasco host cities)

Final positions
- Champions: (Brazil) Sollys/Osasco (3rd title)

Tournament awards
- MVP: (Brazil) Jaqueline Carvalho (Sollys/Osasco)

The 2011 Women's South American Volleyball Club Championship was the third official edition of the women's volleyball tournament, played by four teams over August 5–7, 2011 in José Liberatti Gymnassium in Osasco, Brazil.

== Competing clubs ==
Clubs

(Brazil) Sollys/Osasco
(Paraguay) Sport Club Venezuela
(Chile) Universidad Católica
(Bolivia) Universidad San Francisco Xavier

== Round-Robyn ==
The competition system for the tournament was a single Round-Robin system. Each team plays once against each of the 3 remaining teams. Points are accumulated during the whole tournament, and the final ranking is determined by the total points gained.

Pos	Team	Pld	W	L	Pts	SW	SL	SR	SPW	SPL	SPR
1	(Brazil) Sollys/Osasco	3	3	0	6	9	0	MAX	225	87	2.586
2	(Chile) Universidad Católica	3	2	1	5	6	4	1.500	201	209	0.962
3	(Bolivia) Universidad San Francisco Xavier	3	1	2	4	3	7	0.429	174	229	0.760
4	(Paraguay) Sport Club Venezuela	3	0	3	3	2	9	0.222	188	263	0.715

=== Matches ===
Date		Score		Set 1	Set 2	Set 3	Set 4	Set 5	Total
5 Aug	Universidad Católica (Chile)	3–1	(Paraguay) Sport Club Venezuela	25–12	26–24	15–25	25–23		91–84
5 Aug	Sollys/Osasco (Brazil)	3–0	(Bolivia) U. San Francisco Xavier	25–11	25–6	25–10			75–27
6 Aug	U. San Francisco Xavier (Bolivia)	0–3	(Chile) Universidad Católica	16–25	17–25	17–25			50–75
6 Aug	Sollys/Osasco (Brazil)	3–0	(Paraguay) Sport Club Venezuela	25–8	25–6	25–11			75–25
7 Aug	U. San Francisco Xavier (Bolivia)	3–1	(Paraguay) Sport Club Venezuela	22–25	25–16	25–17	25–21		97–79
7 Aug	Sollys/Osasco (Brazil)	3–0	(Chile) Universidad Católica	25–13	25–11	25–11			75–35

== Final standing ==
Rank	Team
1st place, gold medalist(s)	(Brazil) Sollys/Osasco
2nd place, silver medalist(s)	(Chile) Universidad Católica
3rd place, bronze medalist(s)	(Bolivia) U. San Francisco Xavier
4	(Paraguay) Sport Club Venezuela

Qualified for the 2011 FIVB Women's Club World Championship

2011 Women's South American Volleyball Club Champions

3rd title

== Individual awards ==
- Most valuable player
  - (Brazil) Jaqueline Carvalho (Sollys/Osasco)
- Best spiker
  - (Brazil) Ivna Marra (Sollys/Osasco)
- Best blocker
  - (Brazil) Larissa Gongra (Sollys/Osasco)
- Best server
  - (Brazil) Jaqueline Carvalho (Sollys/Osasco)
- Best digger
  - (Chile) Carla Ruz (Universidad Católica)
- Best setter
  - (Brazil) Karine Guerra (Sollys/Osasco)
- Best receiver
  - (Brazil) Silvana Papini (Sollys/Osasco)
- Best libero
  - (Brazil) Camila Brait (Sollys/Osasco)
