= 2009 Women's South American Volleyball Club Championship =

Tournament details
- Host country: Peru
- Dates: July 1–9, 2009
- Teams: 6
- Venue: Gimnasio Municipalidad de Miraflores (in Lima host cities)

Final positions
- Champions: (Brazil) Sollys/Osasco (1st title)

Tournament awards
- MVP: Jaqueline Carvalho (BRA)

The 2009 Women's South American Volleyball Club Championship was the 2009 annual edition of the women's volleyball tournament, played by six teams from 3 countries over October 14–18, 2009 in Lima, Peru.

== Competing clubs ==
Group A	Group B
(Argentina) Boca Juniors (Peru) Géminis (Brazil) Unilever	(Peru) Regatas Lima (Argentina) River Plate (Brazil) Sollys/Osasco

=== Pool A ===
Pos	Team	Pld	W	L	Pts	SW	SL	SR	SPW	SPL	SPR	Qualification
1	(Brazil) Unilever	2	2	0	4	6	0	MAX	151	107	1.411	Semifinals
2	(Argentina) Boca Juniors	2	1	1	3	3	4	0.750	142	166	0.855	Semifinals
3	(Peru) Géminis	2	0	2	2	1	6	0.167	147	170	0.865	

Date		Score		Set 1	Set 2	Set 3	Set 4	Set 5	Total
14 Oct	Géminis (Peru)	1–3	(Argentina) Boca Juniors	23–25	25–15	19–25	24–26		91–91
15 Oct	Unilever (Brazil)	3–0	(Argentina) Boca Juniors	25–23	25–13	25–15			75–51
16 Oct	Unilever (Brazil)	3–0	(Peru) Géminis	25–16	26–24	25–16			76–56

=== Pool B ===
Pos	Team	Pld	W	L	Pts	SW	SL	SR	SPW	SPL	SPR	Qualification
1	(Brazil) Sollys/Osasco	2	2	0	4	6	1	6.000	172	129	1.333	Semifinals
2	(Peru) Regatas Lima	2	1	1	3	4	4	1.000	174	168	1.036	Semifinals
3	(Argentina) River Plate	2	0	2	2	1	6	0.167	122	171	0.713	

Date		Score		Set 1	Set 2	Set 3	Set 4	Set 5	Total
14 Oct	Sollys/Osasco (Brazil)	3–0	(Argentina) River Plate	25–18	25–14	25–19			75–51
15 Oct	River Plate (Argentina)	1–3	(Peru) Regatas Lima	13–25	25–21	15–25	18–25		71–96
16 Oct	Sollys/Osasco (Brazil)	3–1	(Peru) Regatas Lima	25–12	25–19	22–25	25–22		97–78

== Final round ==
=== Bracket ===
Semifinals
October 17 – Lima
(Brazil) Unilever	3
(Peru) Regatas Lima	0
October 17 – Lima
(Argentina) Boca Juniors	0
(Brazil) Sollys/Osasco	3

Final
October 18 – Lima
(Brazil) Unilever	1
(Brazil) Sollys/Osasco	3
3rd place
October 18 – Lima
(Argentina) Boca Juniors	3
(Peru) Regatas Lima	2

=== Semifinals ===
Date		Score		Set 1	Set 2	Set 3	Set 4	Set 5	Total
17 Oct	Unilever (Brazil)	3–0	(Peru) Regatas Lima	25–13	25–8	25–14			75–35
17 Oct	Boca Juniors (Argentina)	0–3	(Brazil) Sollys/Osasco	14–25	11–25	12–25			37–75

=== 5th place ===
Date		Score		Set 1	Set 2	Set 3	Set 4	Set 5	Total
18 Oct	Géminis (Peru)	3–1	(Argentina) River Plate	25–19	25–17	17–25	26-24		93-85

=== 3rd place ===
Date		Score		Set 1	Set 2	Set 3	Set 4	Set 5	Total
18 Oct	Boca Juniors (Argentina)	3–2	(Peru) Regatas Lima	25–23	17–25	25–21	18-25	15-10	100–104

=== Final ===
Date		Score		Set 1	Set 2	Set 3	Set 4	Set 5	Total
18 Oct	Unilever (Brazil)	1–3	(Brazil) Sollys/Osasco	19–25	17–25	25–12	18-25		79–87

== Final standing ==
Rank	Team
1st place, gold medalist(s)	(Brazil) Sollys/Osasco
2nd place, silver medalist(s)	(Brazil) Rio de Janeiro
3rd place, bronze medalist(s)	(Argentina) Boca Juniors
4	(Peru) Regatas Lima
5	(Peru) Géminis
6	(Argentina) River Plate

2009 Women's South American Volleyball Club Champions

1st title

== Awards ==
- MVP: (Brazil) Jaqueline Carvalho (Sollys/Osasco)
- Best spiker: (Brazil) Natalia Pereira (Sollys/Osasco)
- Best blocker: (Brazil) Carol Gattaz (Unilever)
- Best server: (Brazil) Danielle Lins (Unilever)
- Best setter: (Brazil) Carolina Albuquerque (Sollys/Osasco)
- Best receiver: (Brazil) Welissa Gonzaga (Sollys/Osasco)
- Best digger: (Brazil) Camila Brait (Sollys/Osasco)
- Best libero: (Brazil) Fabiana de Oliveira (Unilever)
