= Camila Brait =

Brazilian volleyball player

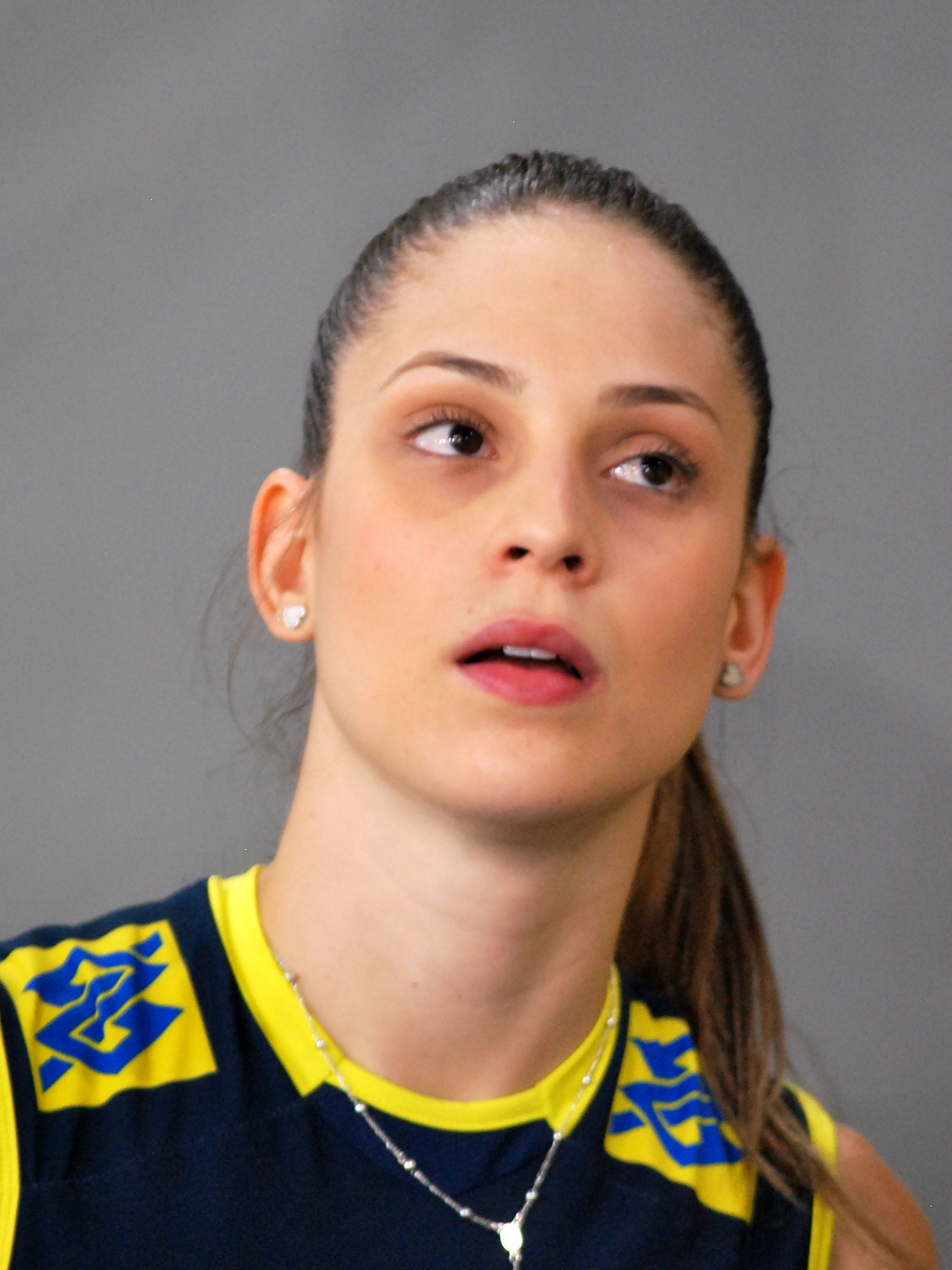
- Brait in 2012

Personal information
- Full name: Camila de Paula Brait
- Born: 28 October 1988 (age 38); Frutal, Minas Gerais, Brazil
- Height: 1.70 m (5 ft 7 in)

Volleyball information
- Position: Libero
- Current club: Osasco Audax
- Number: 18

Career
Years	Teams
1997–2004	URS/Sacramento
2005–2006	SESI/Uberlândia
2006–2007	Praia Clube
2007–2008	São Caetano
2008–2026	Osasco/Audax

National team
2007–2016, 2019-2021	Brazil
Honours
Women's volleyball
Representing Brazil
Olympic Games
Silver medal – second place	2020 Tokyo	Team
World Championship
Silver medal – second place	2010 Japan	Team
Bronze medal – third place	2014 Italy	Team
World Grand Champions Cup
Gold medal – first place	2013 Japan	Team
World Grand Prix
Gold medal – first place	2009 Tokyo	Team
Gold medal – first place	2014 Tokyo	Team
Gold medal – first place	2016 Bangkok	Team
Pan American Games
Silver medal – second place	2015 Toronto	Team
Pan-American Cup
Gold medal – first place	2009 Miami
Silver medal – second place	2007 Colima
Silver medal – second place	2008 Tijuana
South American Championship
Gold medal – first place	2009 Porto Alegre
Gold medal – first place	2013 Ica
Gold medal – first place	2015 Cartagena
FIVB Nations League
Silver medal – second place	2021 Rimini	Team

Camila de Paula Brait (born 28 October 1988) is a retired Brazilian volleyball player from Frutal, Brazil, who plays as a libero. She mostly spent her career with Osasco Voleibol Clube, and played many tournaments with the Brazilian national team, winning the silver medal while representing Brazil at the 2020 Summer Olympics.

== Career ==
Born in Frutal and raised in Sacramento, Minas Gerais, Brait started her career defending the city's team União Recreativa Sacramentana, until URS lost its financial support and made her move to Uberlândia, playing for both SESI/Uberlândia and Praia Clube. Making her professional debut with São Caetano/MonBijou, she eventually signed with Osasco in 2008, spending the rest of her career there.

Playing with Osasco, Brait won the gold medal and the Best Libero award in the 2012 FIVB Club World Championship held in Doha, Qatar.

Brait won the silver medal in the 2014 FIVB Club World Championship after her club lost 0–3 to the Russian Dinamo Kazan in the championship match.

In 2026, Brait announced her retirement to dedicate herself to raise her two children.

=== International career ===
Brait played her first international game against Venezuela. She participated in the 2010 FIVB Volleyball Women's World Championship, held in Japan, helping her country finish in the second position.

Brait won the Best Receiver, Best Digger, and Best Libero awards when her national team won the silver medal at the 2015 Pan American Games being defeated in the championship match 0–3 to the United States.

After not making the final roster of the Brazilian team in 2012 and 2016, even spending three years away from the national team after the latter, Brait was selected to the national squad to compete in the women's volleyball tournament at the 2020 Summer Olympics. She won the silver medal, and announced afterwards her retirement from the national team.

== Awards ==
=== Individuals ===
- 2006 U20 South American Championship – "Best Receiver"
- 2006 U20 South American Championship – "Best Libero"
- 2007 Pan-American Cup – "Best Digger"
- 2008 Pan-American Cup – "Best Digger"
- 2009 South American Club Championship – "Best Digger"
- 2009–10 Brazilian Superliga – "Best Libero"
- 2010 South American Club Championship – "Best Libero"
- 2010–11 Brazilian Superliga – "Best Receiver"
- 2011 South American Club Championship – "Best Libero"
- 2011–12 Brazilian Superliga – "Best Receiver"
- 2012 South American Club Championship – "Best Libero"
- 2012 FIVB Club World Championship – "Best Libero"
- 2012–13 Brazilian Superliga – "Best Digger"
- 2014–15 Brazilian Superliga – "Best Receiver"
- 2015 Pan American Games – "Best Libero"
- 2015 Pan American Games – "Best Digger"
- 2015 Pan American Games – "Best Receiver"
- 2018–19 Brazilian Superliga – "Best Libero"
- 2020-21 Brazilian Superliga – "Best Libero"

=== Club ===
- 2009 South American Club Championship – Champion, with Sollys Osasco
- 2010 South American Club Championship – Champion, with Sollys Osasco
- 2011 South American Club Championship – Champion, with Sollys Osasco
- 2012 South American Club Championship – Champion, with Sollys Osasco
- 2014 South American Club Championship – Runner-up, with Molico Osasco
- 2015 South American Club Championship – Runner-up, with Molico Osasco
- 2010 FIVB Club World Championship – Runner-up, with Sollys Nestlé Osasco
- 2011 FIVB Club World Championship – Bronze medal, with Sollys Nestlé Osasco
- 2012 FIVB Club World Championship – Champion, with Sollys Nestlé Osasco
- 2014 FIVB Club World Championship – Runner-up, with Molico Osasco
- 2009-2010 Brazilian Superliga – Champion, with Osasco
- 2011-12 Brazilian Superliga – Champion, with Osasco
- 2024-25 Brazilian Superliga – Champion, with Osasco
- 2008 Brazilian Cup – Champion, with Osasco
- 2014 Brazilian Cup – Champion, with Osasco
- 2018 Brazilian Cup – Champion, with Osasco

Awards
Preceded by (Turkey) Gizem Güreşen	Best Libero of FIVB Club World Championship; 2012	Succeeded by (Japan) Yuko Sano
