= Osasco Voleibol Clube =

Brazilian volleyball club

Osasco/São Cristóvão Saúde
- Full name: Osasco Voleibol Clube
- Short name: Vôlei Osasco
- Founded: 1996
- Ground: Ginásio Municipal Prof. José Liberatti (Capacity: 4,500)
- Head coach: Luizomar de Moura
- Captain: Camila Brait
- League: Brazilian Superliga
- 2024-2025: Champions (sixth title)
- Website: Club home page

Uniforms
Home	Away

Osasco Voleibol Clube is a professional women's volleyball club, based in Osasco, São Paulo (state), Brazil. It includes volleyball teams for females of all ages, children through adult. Since the 2021–22 season the club plays under the name Osasco/São Cristóvão Saúde.

== History ==
The club was founded in 1993, by the BCN bank, as BCN/Guarujá and changed headquarters' city in 1996, thereafter becoming known as BCN/Osasco. The club was renamed to Finasa/Osasco in 2003. The club even announced it would close its adult volleyball department in April 2009, after losing the 2008-2009 Superliga final. But four days later it was announced the return of the adult team, through a group of sponsors in partnership with the Prefecture of Osasco. Now, the Osasco team is sponsored by Nestlé, at first highlighting the Sollys product line. The club participated in the 2009-2010 Superliga, renamed in 2009 to Sollys/Osasco. In that season, the club became champion, beating its greatest rival: the Unilever/Rio de Janeiro, and also taking the South American Club Championship.

For the 2011–12 season of the Brazilian Superliga, the team name changed to Sollys/Nestlé, adopting the colors white, blue and orange (and while sporting those colors the team won the 2012 FIVB Women's Club World Championship). In 2013–14 season of the Brazilian Superliga, Nestle chose to change the product associated to the club name. Thus, Sollys was replaced by Molico, and the team then became Molico/Nestlé, adopting the colors white, blue and red.

== Home arena ==
Osasco/São Cristóvão Saúde plays their home games at Ginásio Municipal Professor José Liberatti, located in Osasco. The arena seats 4,500 people.

== Current roster ==
Season 2023-2024 squad - As of January 2024

Team roster - season 2022–2023
Number	Player	Position	Height (m)	Birth date
13	(Brazil) Kenya Malachias	Setter	1.85	November 29, 2000 (age 25)
20	(Brazil) Giovana Gasparini	Setter	1.74	July 5, 1994 (age 31)
12	(Brazil) Maynara Rossi	Setter	1.70	May 25, 1999 (age 26)
1	(Brazil) Fabiana Claudino	Middle Blocker	1.94	January 24, 1985 (age 41)
5	(Brazil) Adenizia Ferreira	Middle Blocker	1.86	December 18, 1986 (age 39)
3	(Brazil) Saraelem Lima	Middle Blocker	1.84	April 16, 1994 (age 31)
17	(Poland) Smarzek Malwina	Opposite	1.91	June 3, 1996 (age 29)
11	(Brazil) Giulia Dias	Opposite	1.90	February 9, 1999 (age 27)
9	(Brazil) Tifanny Abreu	Opposite	1.92	October 27, 1984 (age 41)
7	(Brazil) Silvana Papini	Outside Hitter	1.78	January 27, 1988 (age 38)
16	(Brazil) Glayce Kelly	Outside Hitter	1.87	January 28, 1998 (age 28)
8	(Brazil) Gabrielle Eduarda	Outside Hitter	1.84	January 7, 1999 (age 27)
15	(Brazil) Drussyla Costa	Outside Hitter	1.86	July 1, 1996 (age 29)
6	(United States) Micaya White	Outside Hitter	1.86	September 27, 1998 (age 27)
14	(Brazil) Tamara Abila	Outside Hitter	1.91	October 10, 1998 (age 27)
10	(Brazil) Keyla Alves	Libero	1.69	January 8, 2000 (age 26)
2	(Brazil) Natinha Araújo	Libero	1.62	April 10, 1997 (age 28)
18	(Brazil) Camila Brait	Ambassador	1.73	October 28, 1988 (age 37)

Team roster - season 2021–2022
Number	Player	Position	Height (m)	Birth date
1	(Brazil) Fabiana Claudino	Middle Blocker	1.93	January 24, 1985 (age 41)
2	(Brazil) Keyla Alves	Libero	1.69	January 8, 2000 (age 26)
3	(Brazil) Saraelen Lima	Middle Blocker	1.86	April 16, 1994 (age 31)
4	(Brazil) Karine Schossler	Opposite	1.81	April 13, 2000 (age 25)
5	(United States) Rachael Adams	Middle Blocker	1.88	June 3, 1990 (age 35)
7	(Brazil) Silvana Papini	Outside Hitter	1.78	January 27, 1988 (age 38)
9	(Brazil) Tifanny Abreu	Opposite	1.92	October 27, 1984 (age 41)
10	(Brazil) Michelle Pavão	Outside Hitter	1.78	October 30, 1986 (age 39)
11	(Brazil) Joyce Silva	Opposite	1.90	June 13, 1984 (age 41)
13	(Brazil) Kenya Malachias	Setter	1.85	November 29, 2000 (age 25)
14	(Brazil) Josefa Fabíola Souza	Setter	1.84	February 3, 1983 (age 43)
15	(Brazil) Camila Monteiro	Middle Blocker	1.85	January 17, 1988 (age 38)
17	(Turkey) Ceren Kapucu	Opposite	1.90	July 19, 1993 (age 32)
18	(Brazil) Camila Brait	Libero	1.73	October 28, 1988 (age 37)
20	(Brazil) Carla Santos	Outside Hitter	1.77	January 17, 1992 (age 34)

Team roster - season 2020–2021
Number	Player	Position	Height (m)	Birth date
2	(Brazil) Ana Clara Medina	Outside Hitter	1.81	June 8, 2000 (age 25)
3	(Brazil) Naiane Rios	Setter	1.80	November 29, 1994 (age 31)
4	(Brazil) Karine Schossler	Opposite	1.81	April 13, 2000 (age 25)
5	(Brazil) Amanda Sehn	Setter	1.82	June 16, 1998 (age 27)
6	(Brazil) Erica Lima	Libero	1.66	May 21, 1996 (age 29)
8	(Brazil) Jaqueline Carvalho	Outside Hitter	1.86	December 31, 1983 (age 42)
10	(Brazil) Tainara Santos	Outside Hitter	1.87	March 9, 2000 (age 26)
11	(Brazil) Mayany de Souza	Middle Blocker	1.85	November 24, 1996 (age 29)
12	(Brazil) Roberta Ratzke	Setter	1.85	April 28, 1990 (age 35)
13	(Brazil) Karyna Malachias	Middle Blocker	1.94	October 26, 1999 (age 26)
14	(Brazil) Gabriela Cândido	Outside Hitter	1.81	May 22, 1996 (age 29)
15	(Brazil) Camila Monteiro	Middle Blocler	1.85	January 19, 1988 (age 38)
16	(Brazil) Tandara Caixeta	Opposite	1.84	October 30, 1988 (age 37)
17	(Brazil) Sonaly Cidrão	Outside Hitter	1.83	June 20, 1993 (age 32)
18	(Brazil) Camila Brait	Libero	1.73	October 28, 1988 (age 37)
20	(Brazil) Ana Beatriz Correa	Middle Blocker	1.88	February 7, 1992 (age 34)

Team roster - season 2019–2020
Number	Player	Position	Height (m)	Birth date
1	(Brazil) Mara Leão	Middle Blocker	1.90	July 26, 1991 (age 34)
2	(Brazil) Fernanda Tomé	Outside Hitter	1.95	December 10, 1989 (age 36)
4	(Brazil) Adriani Joaquim	Middle Blocker	1.88	April 26, 1993 (age 32)
5	(Cuba) Heidy Casanova	Opposite	1.84	November 6, 1998 (age 27)
6	(Brazil) Erica Lima	Libero	1.66	May 21, 1996 (age 29)
7	(Brazil) Ellen Braga	Outside Hitter	1.79	June 12, 1991 (age 34)
8	(Brazil) Jaqueline Carvalho	Outside Hitter	1.86	December 31, 1983 (age 42)
9	(Brazil) Amanda Sehn	Setter	1.80	July 16, 1998 (age 27)
10	(Serbia) Ana Bjelica	Opposite	1.90	April 3, 1992 (age 33)
11	(Brazil) Priscila Heldes	Setter	1.78	March 27, 1992 (age 33)
12	(Brazil) Roberta Ratzke	Setter	1.85	April 28, 1990 (age 35)
13	(Brazil) Karyna Malachias	Middle Blocker	1.94	October 26, 1999 (age 26)
14	(Brazil) Raquel Loff da Silva	Middle Blocker	1.93	January 2, 1995 (age 31)
16	(Brazil) Vanessa Janke	Outside Hitter	1.84	March 8, 1991 (age 35)
18	(Brazil) Camila Brait	Libero	1.73	October 28, 1988 (age 37)
20	(Brazil) Ana Beatriz Correa	Middle Blocker	1.88	February 7, 1992 (age 34)

Team roster - season 2018–2019
Number	Player	Position	Height (m)	Birth date
1	(Brazil) Walewska Oliveira	Middle Blocker	1.90	October 1, 1979 (age 46)
2	(Brazil) Carolina Albuquerque	Setter	1.82	July 25, 1977 (age 48)
3	(Brazil) Gabriela Zeni	Setter	1.80	May 1, 1997 (age 28)
4	(Brazil) Paula Pequeno	Outside Hitter	1.84	January 22, 1982 (age 44)
5	(Peru) Angela Leyva	Outside Hitter	1.84	November 22, 1996 (age 29)
6	(Brazil) Erica Lima	Libero	1.66	May 21, 1996 (age 29)
7	(Brazil) Domingas Araújo	Outside Hitter	1.84	September 9, 1994 (age 31)
8	(Brazil) Cláudia Bueno	Setter	1.81	September 21, 1987 (age 38)
9	(Brazil) Viviane Braun	Outside Hitter	1.73	October 17, 1997 (age 28)
11	(Brazil) Lorenne Teixeira	Opposite	1.87	January 8, 1996 (age 30)
12	(Brazil) Mariana Costa	Outside Hitter	1.81	July 30, 1986 (age 39)
13	(Brazil) Natália Martins	Middle Blocker	1.87	November 12, 1984 (age 41)
15	(Brazil) Natasha Farinea	Middle Blocker	1.88	February 8, 1986 (age 40)
16	(Brazil) Mayara Santana	Middle Blocker	1.86	August 18, 1995 (age 30)
18	(Brazil) Camila Brait	Libero	1.73	October 28, 1988 (age 37)
19	(United States) Destinee Hooker	Opposite	1.91	September 7, 1987 (age 38)

Team roster - season 2017–2018
Number	Player	Position	Height (m)	Birth date
1	(Brazil) Gabriela Zeni	Setter	1.80	May 1, 1997 (age 28)
2	(Brazil) Carolina Albuquerque	Setter	1.82	July 25, 1977 (age 48)
3	(Serbia) Nađa Ninković	Middle Blocker	1.93	November 1, 1991 (age 34)
4	(Brazil) Bruna Neri	Outside Hitter	1.80	November 15, 1992 (age 33)
5	(Peru) Angela Leyva	Outside Hitter	1.84	November 22, 1996 (age 29)
7	(Brazil) Natasha Valente	Outside Hitter	1.83	September 24, 1989 (age 36)
8	(Brazil) Ana Paula Borgo	Opposite	1.87	October 20, 1993 (age 32)
9	(Brazil) Juliana Mello	Middle Blocker	1.86	June 29, 1994 (age 31)
11	(Brazil) Lorenne Teixeira	Opposite	1.87	January 8, 1996 (age 30)
12	(Brazil) Mariana Costa	Outside Hitter	1.81	July 30, 1986 (age 39)
13	(Brazil) Natália Martins	Middle Blocker	1.87	November 12, 1984 (age 41)
14	(Brazil) Fabíola de Souza	Setter	1.84	February 3, 1983 (age 43)
16	(Brazil) Tandara Caixeta	Outside Hitter	1.86	October 30, 1988 (age 37)
18	(Brazil) Camila Brait	Libero	1.73	October 28, 1988 (age 37)
19	(Brazil) Tássia Sthael	Libero	1.76	June 3, 1988 (age 37)
20	(Brazil) Ana Beatriz Correa	Middle Blocker	1.88	February 7, 1992 (age 34)

Team roster - season 2016–2017
Number	Player	Position	Height (m)	Birth date
1	(Brazil) Gabriela Zeni	Setter	1.80	May 1, 1997 (age 28)
2	(Brazil) Carolina Albuquerque	Setter	1.82	July 25, 1977 (age 48)
3	(Brazil) Danielle Lins	Setter	1.81	January 5, 1985 (age 41)
4	(Brazil) Bruna Neri	Outside Hitter	1.80	November 15, 1992 (age 33)
6	(Serbia) Tijana Malešević	Outside Hitter	1.85	March 18, 1991 (age 35)
7	(Brazil) Fernanda Batista	Middle Blocker	1.80	September 3, 1995 (age 30)
8	(Brazil) Ana Paula Borgo	Opposite	1.87	October 20, 1993 (age 32)
9	(Brazil) Saraelen Lima	Middle Blocker	1.84	April 16, 1994 (age 31)
10	(Serbia) Ana Bjelica	Opposite	1.90	April 3, 1992 (age 33)
11	(Brazil) Clarisse Peixoto	Outside Hitter	1.80	January 3, 1987 (age 39)
12	(Brazil) Gabriella Souza	Outside Hitter	1.75	December 14, 1993 (age 32)
13	(Brazil) Natália Martins	Middle Blocker	1.87	November 12, 1984 (age 41)
16	(Brazil) Tandara Caixeta	Outside Hitter	1.84	October 30, 1988 (age 37)
18	(Brazil) Camila Brait	Libero	1.73	October 28, 1988 (age 37)
20	(Brazil) Ana Beatriz Correa	Middle Blocker	1.88	February 7, 1992 (age 34)

Team roster - season 2015–2016
Number	Player	Position	Height (m)	Birth date
2	(Brazil) Daniela Terra	Libero	1.68	July 29, 1994 (age 31)
3	(Brazil) Danielle Lins	Setter	1.81	January 5, 1985 (age 41)
4	(Cuba) Kenia Carcaces	Outside Hitter	1.90	January 2, 1986 (age 40)
5	(Brazil) Adenízia da Silva	Middle Blocker	1.87	December 18, 1986 (age 39)
6	(Brazil) Thaísa Menezes	Middle Blocker	1.96	May 15, 1987 (age 38)
8	(Belgium) Lise Van Hecke	Opposite	1.88	July 1, 1992 (age 33)
9	(Brazil) Saraelen Lima	Middle Blocker	1.84	April 16, 1994 (age 31)
10	(Brazil) Suelle Oliveira	Outside Hitter	1.87	April 29, 1987 (age 38)
11	(Brazil) Ivna Marra	Opposite	1.85	January 25, 1990 (age 36)
12	(Brazil) Gabriella Souza	Outside Hitter	1.75	December 14, 1993 (age 32)
14	(Brazil) Diana Ferreira	Setter	1.77	May 15, 1985 (age 40)
15	(Brazil) Marjorie Correa	Middle Blocker	1.86	September 12, 1992 (age 33)
18	(Brazil) Camila Brait	Libero	1.73	October 28, 1988 (age 37)

== Titles and honours ==
=== International competitions ===
- FIVB Volleyball Women's Club World Championship
  - Champions: 2012
  - Runners-up (x2): 2010, 2014
  - Third-place: 1994, 2011, 2025
- South American Club Championship
  - Champions (x4): 2009, 2010, 2011, 2012
  - Runners-up: 2014
- Top Volley International
  - Champions (x2): 2004, 2014

=== Domestic competitions ===
- Brazilian Superliga
  - Champions (x6): 2002–03, 2003–04, 2004–05, 2009–10, 2011–12, 2024–25
  - Runners-up (x12): 1993–94, 1994–95, 1995–96, 2001–02, 2005–06, 2006–07, 2007–08, 2008–09, 2010–11, 2012–13, 2014–15, 2016–17
- Brazilian Cup
  - Champions (x4): 2008, 2014, 2018, 2025
  - Runners-up: 2007
- Campeonato Paulista (N.B.: 1994 and 1996 won as BCN/Guarujá):
  - Champions (x16): 1994, 1996, 2001, 2002, 2003, 2004, 2005, 2006, 2007, 2008, 2012, 2013, 2014, 2015, 2016, 2017, 2020, 2021
  - Runners-up (x4): 1998, 1999, 2009, 2011
- Salonpas Cup
  - Champions (x4): 2001, 2002, 2005, 2008
  - Runners-up (x3): 2004, 2006, 2007
