= 2010 Women's South American Volleyball Club Championship =

Tournament details
- Host country: Peru
- Dates: July 16–18, 2010
- Teams: 6
- Venue: Manuel Bonilla Stadium (in Lima host cities)

Final positions
- Champions: (Brazil) Sollys/Osasco (2nd title)

Tournament awards
- MVP: Adenízia da Silva (BRA)

The 2010 Women's South American Volleyball Club Championship was the second official edition of the women's volleyball tournament, played by four teams over July 16–18, 2010 in Manuel Bonilla Stadium in Miraflores, Lima, Peru.

== Competing clubs ==
Clubs

(Argentina) Banco de la Nación
(Peru) Géminis
(Brazil) Sollys/Osasco
(Chile) Universidad Católica

== Round-Robyn ==
The competition system for the tournament was a single Round-Robin system. Each team plays once against each of the 3 remaining teams. Points are accumulated during the whole tournament, and the final ranking is determined by the total points gained.

Pos	Team	Pld	W	L	Pts	SW	SL	SR	SPW	SPL	SPR
1	(Brazil) Sollys/Osasco	3	3	0	6	9	0	MAX	227	134	1.694
2	(Peru) Géminis	3	2	1	5	6	6	1.000	242	247	0.980
3	(Argentina) Banco de la Nación	3	1	2	4	5	7	0.714	256	265	0.966
4	(Chile) Universidad Católica	3	0	3	3	2	9	0.222	189	268	0.705

=== Matches ===
Date		Score		Set 1	Set 2	Set 3	Set 4	Set 5	Total
17 Sep	Sollys/Osasco (Brazil)	3–0	(Argentina) Banco de la Nación	25–13	25–17	27–25			75–55
17 Sep	Géminis (Peru)	3–1	(Chile) Universidad Católica	24–26	25–14	25–9	25–16		99–65
17 Sep	Sollys/Osasco (Brazil)	3–0	(Chile) Universidad Católica	25–17	25–11	25–11			75–39
18 Sep	Géminis (Peru)	3–2	(Argentina) Banco de la Nación	28–26	14–25	25–20	21–25	15–11	103–107
18 Sep	Banco de la Nación (Argentina)	3–1	(Chile) Universidad Católica	25–22	19–25	25–16	25–22		94–85
18 Sep	Géminis (Peru)	0–3	(Brazil) Sollys/Osasco	14–25	14–25	12–25			40–75

== Final standing ==
Rank	Team
1st place, gold medalist(s)	(Brazil) Sollys/Osasco
2nd place, silver medalist(s)	(Peru) Géminis
3rd place, bronze medalist(s)	(Argentina) Banco de la Nación
4	(Chile) Universidad Católica

Qualified for the 2010 FIVB Women's Club World Championship

2010 Women's South American Volleyball Club Champions

2nd title

== Individual awards ==
- Most valuable player
  - (Brazil) Adenizia da Silva (Sollys/Osasco)
- Best spiker
  - (Brazil) Natalia Pereira (Sollys/Osasco)
- Best blocker
  - (Peru) Jessenia Uceda (Géminis)
- Best server
  - (Brazil) Sassá (Sollys/Osasco)
- Best digger
  - (Brazil) Thais Barbosa (Sollys/Osasco)
- Best setter
  - (Brazil) Carolina Albuquerque (Sollys/Osasco)
- Best receiver
  - (Argentina) Daniela Gildenberger (Banco de la Nación)
- Best libero
  - (Brazil) Camila Brait (Sollys/Osasco)
