= 2011 FIVB World Grand Prix squads =

This article show all participating team squads at the 2011 FIVB World Grand Prix, played by sixteen countries with the final round held in Macau, China.

== Argentina ==
The following is the Argentina roster in the 2011 FIVB World Grand Prix.

#	Name	Date of Birth	Height	Weight	Spike	Block	Club
1	Lucia Gaido	19 January 1988	164 cm (5 ft 5 in)	53 kg (117 lb)	245 cm (8 ft 0 in)	244 cm (8 ft 0 in)	Stiinta Bacau
2	Marianela Garbari	13 November 1980	165 cm (5 ft 5 in)	65 kg (143 lb)	280 cm (9 ft 2 in)	270 cm (8 ft 10 in)	GELP
3	Paula Yamila Nizetich	27 January 1989	181 cm (5 ft 11 in)	74 kg (163 lb)	305 cm (10 ft 0 in)	295 cm (9 ft 8 in)	NIlufer
4	Aylin Pereyra	2 July 1988	180 cm (5 ft 11 in)	68 kg (150 lb)	300 cm (9 ft 10 in)	292 cm (9 ft 7 in)	Boca Juniors
5	Lucia Fresco	14 May 1991	195 cm (6 ft 5 in)	92 kg (203 lb)	304 cm (10 ft 0 in)	290 cm (9 ft 6 in)	Urbino
6	Daniela Gildenberger	12 June 1984	180 cm (5 ft 11 in)	77 kg (170 lb)	300 cm (9 ft 10 in)	290 cm (9 ft 6 in)	GELP
7	Ileana Leyendeker	14 October 1986	189 cm (6 ft 2 in)	84 kg (185 lb)	301 cm (9 ft 11 in)	293 cm (9 ft 7 in)	Calais
8	Tatiana Soledad Rizzo	30 December 1986	178 cm (5 ft 10 in)	64 kg (141 lb)	280 cm (9 ft 2 in)	268 cm (8 ft 10 in)	Boca Juniors
9	Camila Jersonsky	30 May 1991	181 cm (5 ft 11 in)	68 kg (150 lb)	305 cm (10 ft 0 in)	289 cm (9 ft 6 in)	Auburn College
10	Emilce Sosa	11 September 1987	177 cm (5 ft 10 in)	72 kg (159 lb)	305 cm (10 ft 0 in)	295 cm (9 ft 8 in)	Rio Do Soul
11	Georgina Pinedo	30 May 1981	180 cm (5 ft 11 in)	64 kg (141 lb)	312 cm (10 ft 3 in)	290 cm (9 ft 6 in)	Le Cannet
12	Antonella Bortolozzi	22 January 1986	182 cm (6 ft 0 in)	72 kg (159 lb)	298 cm (9 ft 9 in)	278 cm (9 ft 1 in)	Boca Juniors
13	Leticia Boscacci	8 November 1985	186 cm (6 ft 1 in)	70 kg (150 lb)	302 cm (9 ft 11 in)	284 cm (9 ft 4 in)	VC Kanti
14	Florencia Carlotto	14 October 1988	183 cm (6 ft 0 in)	72 kg (159 lb)	302 cm (9 ft 11 in)	291 cm (9 ft 7 in)	Velez Sarsfield
15	Julieta Constanza Lazcano	25 July 1989	190 cm (6 ft 3 in)	74 kg (163 lb)	312 cm (10 ft 3 in)	293 cm (9 ft 7 in)	Istres
16	Florencia Natasha Busquets Reyes	27 June 1989	192 cm (6 ft 4 in)	68 kg (150 lb)	305 cm (10 ft 0 in)	290 cm (9 ft 6 in)	Hotel VFM
17	Antonela Ayelen Curatola	23 October 1991	175 cm (5 ft 9 in)	71 kg (157 lb)	290 cm (9 ft 6 in)	280 cm (9 ft 2 in)	Velez Sarsfield
18	Yael Castiglione	27 September 1985	184 cm (6 ft 0 in)	75 kg (165 lb)	295 cm (9 ft 8 in)	281 cm (9 ft 3 in)	Rio Do Soul
19	Clarisa Sagardia	29 June 1989	174 cm (5 ft 9 in)	67 kg (148 lb)	290 cm (9 ft 6 in)	280 cm (9 ft 2 in)	Boca Juniors

== Brazil ==
The following is the Brazil roster in the 2011 FIVB World Grand Prix.

#	Name	Date of Birth	Height	Weight	Spike	Block	Club
1	Fabiana Claudino	24 January 1985	193 cm (6 ft 4 in)	76 kg (168 lb)	314 cm (10 ft 4 in)	293 cm (9 ft 7 in)	SESI - SP
2	Juciely Cristina Barreto	18 December 1980	184 cm (6 ft 0 in)	71 kg (157 lb)	289 cm (9 ft 6 in)	285 cm (9 ft 4 in)	UNILEVER
3	Danielle Lins	5 January 1985	181 cm (5 ft 11 in)	68 kg (150 lb)	290 cm (9 ft 6 in)	276 cm (9 ft 1 in)	Molico/Nestlé
4	Paula Pequeno	22 January 1982	184 cm (6 ft 0 in)	74 kg (163 lb)	302 cm (9 ft 11 in)	285 cm (9 ft 4 in)	FENERBAHCE
5	Adenizia da Silva	18 December 1986	185 cm (6 ft 1 in)	63 kg (139 lb)	312 cm (10 ft 3 in)	290 cm (9 ft 6 in)	Molico/Nestlé
6	Thaisa Menezes	15 May 1987	196 cm (6 ft 5 in)	79 kg (174 lb)	316 cm (10 ft 4 in)	301 cm (9 ft 11 in)	Molico/Nestlé
7	Marianne Steinbrecher	23 August 1983	188 cm (6 ft 2 in)	70 kg (150 lb)	310 cm (10 ft 2 in)	290 cm (9 ft 6 in)	FENERBAHCE
8	Jaqueline Carvalho	31 December 1983	186 cm (6 ft 1 in)	70 kg (150 lb)	302 cm (9 ft 11 in)	286 cm (9 ft 5 in)	Minas Tênis Clube
9	Juliana Nogueira	4 August 1988	190 cm (6 ft 3 in)	71 kg (157 lb)	307 cm (10 ft 1 in)	301 cm (9 ft 11 in)	Unilever
10	Welissa Gonzaga	9 September 1982	179 cm (5 ft 10 in)	76 kg (168 lb)	300 cm (9 ft 10 in)	287 cm (9 ft 5 in)	Dentil Praia Clube
11	Joyce Silva	13 June 1984	190 cm (6 ft 3 in)	67 kg (148 lb)	311 cm (10 ft 2 in)	294 cm (9 ft 8 in)	KGC Pro Volleyball Club-KO
12	Natalia Pereira	4 April 1989	183 cm (6 ft 0 in)	76 kg (168 lb)	300 cm (9 ft 10 in)	288 cm (9 ft 5 in)	Rexona-Ades
13	Sheilla Castro	1 July 1983	185 cm (6 ft 1 in)	64 kg (141 lb)	302 cm (9 ft 11 in)	284 cm (9 ft 4 in)	Vakifbank
14	Fabiana Oliveira	7 March 1980	169 cm (5 ft 7 in)	59 kg (130 lb)	276 cm (9 ft 1 in)	266 cm (8 ft 9 in)	Unilever Volei
15	Ana Tiemi	26 October 1987	187 cm (6 ft 2 in)	74 kg (163 lb)	295 cm (9 ft 8 in)	284 cm (9 ft 4 in)	Bursa B.B. SK
16	Fernanda Garay	10 May 1986	179 cm (5 ft 10 in)	74 kg (163 lb)	308 cm (10 ft 1 in)	288 cm (9 ft 5 in)	Dinamo Krasnodar
17	Fabiola de Sousa	3 February 1983	184 cm (6 ft 0 in)	70 kg (150 lb)	300 cm (9 ft 10 in)	285 cm (9 ft 4 in)	Dinamo Krasnodar
18	Camila Brait	28 October 1988	170 cm (5 ft 7 in)	58 kg (128 lb)	271 cm (8 ft 11 in)	256 cm (8 ft 5 in)	Molico/Nestlé
19	Tandara Caixeta	30 October 1988	184 cm (6 ft 0 in)	87 kg (192 lb)	295 cm (9 ft 8 in)	285 cm (9 ft 4 in)	Sollys/Osasco
20	Suelle Oliveira	29 April 1987	187 cm (6 ft 2 in)	72 kg (159 lb)	291 cm (9 ft 7 in)	278 cm (9 ft 1 in)	SESI - SP

== China ==
The following is the China roster in the 2011 FIVB World Grand Prix.

#	Name	Date of Birth	Height	Weight	Spike	Block	Club
1	Yin Na	3 February 1988	182 cm (6 ft 0 in)	65 kg (143 lb)	313 cm (10 ft 3 in)	300 cm (9 ft 10 in)	Tianjin
2	Zhu Ting	29 November 1994	198 cm (6 ft 6 in)	78 kg (172 lb)	327 cm (10 ft 9 in)	300 cm (9 ft 10 in)	Henan
3	Wang Ning	14 May 1994	189 cm (6 ft 2 in)	60 kg (130 lb)	312 cm (10 ft 3 in)	303 cm (9 ft 11 in)	Tianjin
4	Wang Na	25 February 1990	178 cm (5 ft 10 in)	63 kg (139 lb)	305 cm (10 ft 0 in)	295 cm (9 ft 8 in)	Zhejiang
5	Shen Jingsi	3 May 1989	186 cm (6 ft 1 in)	75 kg (165 lb)	305 cm (10 ft 0 in)	294 cm (9 ft 8 in)	Army
6	Yang Junjing	15 May 1989	190 cm (6 ft 3 in)	70 kg (150 lb)	308 cm (10 ft 1 in)	300 cm (9 ft 10 in)	Army
7	Zhang Xian	16 March 1985	168 cm (5 ft 6 in)	57 kg (126 lb)	290 cm (9 ft 6 in)	280 cm (9 ft 2 in)	Guangdong Evergrande
8	Zeng Chunlei	3 November 1989	187 cm (6 ft 2 in)	67 kg (148 lb)	315 cm (10 ft 4 in)	315 cm (10 ft 4 in)	Beijing
9	Wang Yimei	11 January 1988	190 cm (6 ft 3 in)	87 kg (192 lb)	318 cm (10 ft 5 in)	305 cm (10 ft 0 in)	Liaoning
10	Shan Danna	8 October 1991	168 cm (5 ft 6 in)	60 kg (130 lb)	290 cm (9 ft 6 in)	285 cm (9 ft 4 in)	Zhejiang
11	Xu Yunli	2 August 1987	195 cm (6 ft 5 in)	75 kg (165 lb)	325 cm (10 ft 8 in)	306 cm (10 ft 0 in)	Fujian
12	Hui Ruoqi	4 March 1991	192 cm (6 ft 4 in)	78 kg (172 lb)	315 cm (10 ft 4 in)	305 cm (10 ft 0 in)	Jiangsu Volleyball Club
13	Chen Liyi	27 April 1989	184 cm (6 ft 0 in)	75 kg (165 lb)	302 cm (9 ft 11 in)	290 cm (9 ft 6 in)	Tianjin
14	Zhang Lei	11 January 1985	181 cm (5 ft 11 in)	71 kg (157 lb)	316 cm (10 ft 4 in)	310 cm (10 ft 2 in)	Shanghai
16	Ding Xia	13 January 1990	180 cm (5 ft 11 in)	61 kg (134 lb)	305 cm (10 ft 0 in)	300 cm (9 ft 10 in)	Liaoning
17	Liu Congcong	8 December 1990	189 cm (6 ft 2 in)	65 kg (143 lb)	310 cm (10 ft 2 in)	302 cm (9 ft 11 in)	Army
18	Chen Zhan	11 October 1990	180 cm (5 ft 11 in)	65 kg (143 lb)	300 cm (9 ft 10 in)	295 cm (9 ft 8 in)	Jiangsu
19	Ma Yunwen	19 October 1986	190 cm (6 ft 3 in)	76 kg (168 lb)	315 cm (10 ft 4 in)	307 cm (10 ft 1 in)	Shanghai
20	Liu Dan	29 August 1989	180 cm (5 ft 11 in)	65 kg (143 lb)	305 cm (10 ft 0 in)	295 cm (9 ft 8 in)	Guangdong Evergrande

== Cuba ==
The following is the Cuba roster in the 2011 FIVB World Grand Prix.

#	Name	Date of Birth	Height	Weight	Spike	Block	Club
1	Wilma Salas Rosell	9 March 1991	188 cm (6 ft 2 in)	60 kg (130 lb)	313 cm (10 ft 3 in)	298 cm (9 ft 9 in)	Santiago de Cuba
2	Yanelis Santos Allegne	30 March 1986	183 cm (6 ft 0 in)	71 kg (157 lb)	315 cm (10 ft 4 in)	312 cm (10 ft 3 in)	Ciego de Avilas
3	Alena Rojas Orta	9 August 1992	186 cm (6 ft 1 in)	78 kg (172 lb)	320 cm (10 ft 6 in)	305 cm (10 ft 0 in)	Ciudad de la Habana
4	Yoana Palacio Mendoza	6 October 1990	184 cm (6 ft 0 in)	67 kg (148 lb)	313 cm (10 ft 3 in)	300 cm (9 ft 10 in)	Ciudad Habana
5	Yunieska Batista Robles	21 March 1993	185 cm (6 ft 1 in)	70 kg (150 lb)	315 cm (10 ft 4 in)	300 cm (9 ft 10 in)	Isla de la Juventud
6	Daymara Lescay Cajigal	5 September 1992	184 cm (6 ft 0 in)	72 kg (159 lb)	308 cm (10 ft 1 in)	290 cm (9 ft 6 in)	Guantanamo
7	Yumilka Ruiz Luaces	8 May 1978	180 cm (5 ft 11 in)	63 kg (139 lb)	326 cm (10 ft 8 in)	305 cm (10 ft 0 in)	Camaguey
8	Emily Borrell Cruz	19 February 1992	167 cm (5 ft 6 in)	55 kg (121 lb)	270 cm (8 ft 10 in)	260 cm (8 ft 6 in)	Villa Clara
9	Yamila Hernandez Santas	8 November 1992	182 cm (6 ft 0 in)	69 kg (152 lb)	301 cm (9 ft 11 in)	285 cm (9 ft 4 in)	La Habana
10	Ana Lidia Cleger Abel	27 November 1989	183 cm (6 ft 0 in)	69 kg (152 lb)	300 cm (9 ft 10 in)	285 cm (9 ft 4 in)	Santiago de Cuba
11	Liannes Castañeda Simon	18 October 1986	188 cm (6 ft 2 in)	70 kg (150 lb)	325 cm (10 ft 8 in)	320 cm (10 ft 6 in)	Guantanamo
12	Dayami Sanchez Savon	14 March 1994	188 cm (6 ft 2 in)	64 kg (141 lb)	314 cm (10 ft 4 in)	302 cm (9 ft 11 in)	Ciudad Habana
13	Rosanna Giel Ramos	10 June 1992	187 cm (6 ft 2 in)	62 kg (137 lb)	320 cm (10 ft 6 in)	315 cm (10 ft 4 in)	Ciego de Avila
14	Kenia Carcaces Opón	22 January 1986	190 cm (6 ft 3 in)	78 kg (172 lb)	306 cm (10 ft 0 in)	289 cm (9 ft 6 in)	Volero Zürich
15	Yusidey Silie Frómeta	11 November 1984	184 cm (6 ft 0 in)	77 kg (170 lb)	316 cm (10 ft 4 in)	300 cm (9 ft 10 in)	Ciudad de la Habana
16	Heydi Rodríguez López	24 June 1993	184 cm (6 ft 0 in)	74 kg (163 lb)	310 cm (10 ft 2 in)	305 cm (10 ft 0 in)	CIENFUEGOS
17	Gyselle de la Caridad Silva Franco	29 October 1991	184 cm (6 ft 0 in)	70 kg (150 lb)	302 cm (9 ft 11 in)	295 cm (9 ft 8 in)	Santiago de Cuba
18	Zoila Barros Fernández	16 August 1976	188 cm (6 ft 2 in)	72 kg (159 lb)	328 cm (10 ft 9 in)	307 cm (10 ft 1 in)	Ciudad de la Habana
19	Jennifer Alvarez Hernandez	29 November 1993	184 cm (6 ft 0 in)	72 kg (159 lb)	310 cm (10 ft 2 in)	294 cm (9 ft 8 in)	Cienfuegos
20	Sulian Matienzo Linares	14 December 1994	178 cm (5 ft 10 in)	67 kg (148 lb)	318 cm (10 ft 5 in)	314 cm (10 ft 4 in)	C. Habana

== Dominican Republic ==
The following is the Dominican Republic roster in the 2011 FIVB World Grand Prix.

#	Name	Date of Birth	Height	Weight	Spike	Block	Club
1	Annerys Victoria Vargas Valdez	7 August 1981	196 cm (6 ft 5 in)	70 kg (150 lb)	327 cm (10 ft 9 in)	320 cm (10 ft 6 in)	Seleccion Nacional
2	Rossy Dahiana Burgos Herrera	7 April 1985	184 cm (6 ft 0 in)	70 kg (150 lb)	305 cm (10 ft 0 in)	300 cm (9 ft 10 in)	Seleccion Nacional
3	Lisvel Elisa Eve Mejia	10 September 1991	194 cm (6 ft 4 in)	70 kg (150 lb)	325 cm (10 ft 8 in)	315 cm (10 ft 4 in)	Mirador
4	Marianne Fersola Norberto	16 January 1992	191 cm (6 ft 3 in)	60 kg (130 lb)	315 cm (10 ft 4 in)	310 cm (10 ft 2 in)	Mirador
5	Brenda Castillo	5 June 1992	167 cm (5 ft 6 in)	55 kg (121 lb)	245 cm (8 ft 0 in)	230 cm (7 ft 7 in)	San Cristobal
6	Carmen Rosa Caso Sierra	29 November 1981	168 cm (5 ft 6 in)	59 kg (130 lb)	240 cm (7 ft 10 in)	230 cm (7 ft 7 in)	Mirador
7	Niverka Dharlenis Marte Frica	19 October 1990	178 cm (5 ft 10 in)	71 kg (157 lb)	295 cm (9 ft 8 in)	283 cm (9 ft 3 in)	Deportivo Nacional
8	Candida Estefany Arias Perez	11 March 1992	194 cm (6 ft 4 in)	68 kg (150 lb)	320 cm (10 ft 6 in)	315 cm (10 ft 4 in)	San Cristobal
9	Sidarka De Los Milagros Nuñez	25 June 1984	185 cm (6 ft 1 in)	62 kg (137 lb)	330 cm (10 ft 10 in)	320 cm (10 ft 6 in)	Club Malanga
10	Milagros Cabral De La Cruz	17 October 1978	182 cm (6 ft 0 in)	63 kg (139 lb)	325 cm (10 ft 8 in)	320 cm (10 ft 6 in)	Los Cachorros
11	Jeoselyna Rodriguez Santos	9 December 1991	187 cm (6 ft 2 in)	63 kg (139 lb)	325 cm (10 ft 8 in)	315 cm (10 ft 4 in)	Mirador
12	Karla Miguelina Echenique Medina	16 May 1986	180 cm (5 ft 11 in)	65 kg (143 lb)	300 cm (9 ft 10 in)	290 cm (9 ft 6 in)	Deportivo Nacional
13	Cindy Carolina Rondon Martinez	12 November 1987	186 cm (6 ft 1 in)	61 kg (134 lb)	320 cm (10 ft 6 in)	315 cm (10 ft 4 in)	Seleccion Nacional
14	Prisilla Altagracia Rivera Brens	29 December 1984	186 cm (6 ft 1 in)	70 kg (150 lb)	320 cm (10 ft 6 in)	315 cm (10 ft 4 in)	San Pedro
15	Francia Jackson Cabrera	8 November 1975	168 cm (5 ft 6 in)	71 kg (157 lb)	245 cm (8 ft 0 in)	235 cm (7 ft 9 in)	Mirador
16	Yonkaira Paola Peña Isabel	10 May 1993	190 cm (6 ft 3 in)	70 kg (150 lb)	320 cm (10 ft 6 in)	310 cm (10 ft 2 in)	Mirador
17	Gina Altagracia Mambru Casilla	21 January 1986	182 cm (6 ft 0 in)	65 kg (143 lb)	330 cm (10 ft 10 in)	315 cm (10 ft 4 in)	Los Cachorros
18	Bethania De La Cruz De Peña	13 May 1987	188 cm (6 ft 2 in)	70 kg (150 lb)	330 cm (10 ft 10 in)	320 cm (10 ft 6 in)	Deportivo Nacional
19	Ana Yorkira Binet Stephens	9 February 1992	174 cm (5 ft 9 in)	58 kg (128 lb)	280 cm (9 ft 2 in)	260 cm (8 ft 6 in)	Samana
20	Brayelin Elizabeth Martinez	11 September 1996	201 cm (6 ft 7 in)	83 kg (183 lb)	330 cm (10 ft 10 in)	320 cm (10 ft 6 in)	Deportivo Nacional

== Germany ==
The following is the Germany roster in the 2011 FIVB World Grand Prix.

#	Name	Date of Birth	Height	Weight	Spike	Block	Club
1	Lenka Dürr	10 December 1990	171 cm (5 ft 7 in)	59 kg (130 lb)	280 cm (9 ft 2 in)	270 cm (8 ft 10 in)	Azeryol Baku
2	Kathleen Weiß	2 February 1984	171 cm (5 ft 7 in)	66 kg (146 lb)	290 cm (9 ft 6 in)	273 cm (8 ft 11 in)	Agel Prostejov
3	Denise Hanke	31 August 1989	179 cm (5 ft 10 in)	58 kg (128 lb)	284 cm (9 ft 4 in)	272 cm (8 ft 11 in)	Impel Wroclaw
4	Kerstin Tzscherlich	15 February 1978	179 cm (5 ft 10 in)	72 kg (159 lb)	295 cm (9 ft 8 in)	282 cm (9 ft 3 in)	Dresdner SC
5	Friederike Thieme	16 April 1987	187 cm (6 ft 2 in)	73 kg (161 lb)	302 cm (9 ft 11 in)	292 cm (9 ft 7 in)	Dresdner SC
6	Kathy Radzuweit	2 March 1982	196 cm (6 ft 5 in)	76 kg (168 lb)	319 cm (10 ft 6 in)	300 cm (9 ft 10 in)	SC Potsdam
7	Patricia Grohmann	27 January 1990	186 cm (6 ft 1 in)	80 kg (180 lb)	303 cm (9 ft 11 in)	289 cm (9 ft 6 in)	Köpenicker SC
8	Berit Kauffeldt	8 July 1990	190 cm (6 ft 3 in)	75 kg (165 lb)	311 cm (10 ft 2 in)	294 cm (9 ft 8 in)	Impel Wroclaw/POL
9	Corina Ssuschke-Voigt	9 May 1983	189 cm (6 ft 2 in)	75 kg (165 lb)	310 cm (10 ft 2 in)	298 cm (9 ft 9 in)	Lokomotiv Baku
10	Anne Matthes	30 April 1985	182 cm (6 ft 0 in)	66 kg (146 lb)	312 cm (10 ft 3 in)	295 cm (9 ft 8 in)	Dresdner SC
11	Christiane Fürst	29 March 1985	193 cm (6 ft 4 in)	80 kg (180 lb)	323 cm (10 ft 7 in)	307 cm (10 ft 1 in)	Eczasibasi Istanbul
12	Heike Beier	9 December 1983	184 cm (6 ft 0 in)	73 kg (161 lb)	305 cm (10 ft 0 in)	293 cm (9 ft 7 in)	BKF Aluprof Bielsko Biala
13	Saskia Hippe	16 January 1991	185 cm (6 ft 1 in)	67 kg (148 lb)	315 cm (10 ft 4 in)	292 cm (9 ft 7 in)	Schweriner SC
14	Margareta Kozuch	30 October 1986	187 cm (6 ft 2 in)	70 kg (150 lb)	309 cm (10 ft 2 in)	297 cm (9 ft 9 in)	RebecchiNordameccanica Piacenz
15	Maren Brinker	10 July 1986	184 cm (6 ft 0 in)	68 kg (150 lb)	303 cm (9 ft 11 in)	295 cm (9 ft 8 in)	Montichiari Volley
16	Lisa Thomsen	20 August 1985	172 cm (5 ft 8 in)	68 kg (150 lb)	290 cm (9 ft 6 in)	285 cm (9 ft 4 in)	Lokomotiv Baku
17	Lena Möllers	6 January 1990	188 cm (6 ft 2 in)	74 kg (163 lb)	312 cm (10 ft 3 in)	297 cm (9 ft 9 in)	Neruda Volley Bolzano
18	Nadja Schaus	8 November 1984	187 cm (6 ft 2 in)	66 kg (146 lb)	305 cm (10 ft 0 in)	295 cm (9 ft 8 in)	Sigel Pallavolo Marsala
19	Regina Burchardt	1 July 1983	186 cm (6 ft 1 in)	77 kg (170 lb)	302 cm (9 ft 11 in)	294 cm (9 ft 8 in)	VC Wiesbaden
20	Mareen Apitz	26 March 1987	183 cm (6 ft 0 in)	73 kg (161 lb)	295 cm (9 ft 8 in)	284 cm (9 ft 4 in)	RC Cannes

== Italy ==
The following is the Italy roster in the 2011 FIVB World Grand Prix.

#	Name	Date of Birth	Height	Weight	Spike	Block	Club
1	Sara Anzanello	30 July 1980	193 cm (6 ft 4 in)	78 kg (172 lb)	316 cm (10 ft 4 in)	298 cm (9 ft 9 in)	Azerrail Baku
2	Cristina Barcellini	20 November 1986	183 cm (6 ft 0 in)	78 kg (172 lb)	307 cm (10 ft 1 in)	292 cm (9 ft 7 in)	Imoco Volley Conegliano
3	Ilaria Garzaro	29 September 1986	189 cm (6 ft 2 in)	70 kg (150 lb)	312 cm (10 ft 3 in)	292 cm (9 ft 7 in)	Chateau d'Ax Urbino Volley
4	Lucia Crisanti	16 March 1986	186 cm (6 ft 1 in)	70 kg (150 lb)	312 cm (10 ft 3 in)	292 cm (9 ft 7 in)	Chateau D'Ax Urbino Volley
5	Giulia Rondon	16 October 1987	189 cm (6 ft 2 in)	74 kg (163 lb)	304 cm (10 ft 0 in)	280 cm (9 ft 2 in)	ICOS Crema
6	Enrica Merlo	28 December 1988	170 cm (5 ft 7 in)	60 kg (130 lb)	281 cm (9 ft 3 in)	262 cm (8 ft 7 in)	Foppapedretti Bergamo
7	Martina Guiggi	1 May 1984	187 cm (6 ft 2 in)	80 kg (180 lb)	315 cm (10 ft 4 in)	290 cm (9 ft 6 in)	Guangdong Evergrande
8	Carolina del Pilar Costagrande	15 October 1980	188 cm (6 ft 2 in)	80 kg (180 lb)	312 cm (10 ft 3 in)	291 cm (9 ft 7 in)	Guangdong Evergrande
9	Chiara Di Iulio	5 May 1985	184 cm (6 ft 0 in)	65 kg (143 lb)	291 cm (9 ft 7 in)	278 cm (9 ft 1 in)	Foppapedretti Bergamo
10	Paola Cardullo	18 March 1982	159 cm (5 ft 3 in)	56 kg (123 lb)	275 cm (9 ft 0 in)	268 cm (8 ft 10 in)	0
11	Serena Ortolani	7 January 1987	187 cm (6 ft 2 in)	63 kg (139 lb)	308 cm (10 ft 1 in)	288 cm (9 ft 5 in)	Pomì Casalmaggiore
12	Francesca Piccinini	10 January 1979	184 cm (6 ft 0 in)	71 kg (157 lb)	304 cm (10 ft 0 in)	279 cm (9 ft 2 in)	Liu Jo Modena
13	Valentina Arrighetti	26 January 1985	185 cm (6 ft 1 in)	72 kg (159 lb)	318 cm (10 ft 5 in)	310 cm (10 ft 2 in)	Lokomotiv Baku
14	Eleonora Lo Bianco	22 December 1979	171 cm (5 ft 7 in)	67 kg (148 lb)	287 cm (9 ft 5 in)	273 cm (8 ft 11 in)	Galatasaray Istanbul
15	Antonella Del Core	5 November 1980	180 cm (5 ft 11 in)	70 kg (150 lb)	296 cm (9 ft 9 in)	279 cm (9 ft 2 in)	Fakel Novyj Urengoj
16	Lucia Bosetti	9 July 1989	175 cm (5 ft 9 in)	65 kg (143 lb)	316 cm (10 ft 4 in)	286 cm (9 ft 5 in)	Nordmeccanica Piacenza
17	Simona Gioli	17 September 1977	185 cm (6 ft 1 in)	70 kg (150 lb)	307 cm (10 ft 1 in)	283 cm (9 ft 3 in)	Fakel Novyj Urengoj
18	Marta Bechis	4 September 1989	181 cm (5 ft 11 in)	59 kg (130 lb)	290 cm (9 ft 6 in)	273 cm (8 ft 11 in)	Asystel Volley Novara
19	Giulia Leonardi	1 December 1987	165 cm (5 ft 5 in)	57 kg (126 lb)	280 cm (9 ft 2 in)	261 cm (8 ft 7 in)	Chateau D'Ax Urbino Volley
20	Francesca Ferretti	15 February 1984	180 cm (5 ft 11 in)	70 kg (150 lb)	296 cm (9 ft 9 in)	280 cm (9 ft 2 in)	Rabita Baku

== Japan ==
The following is the Japan roster in the 2011 FIVB World Grand Prix.

#	Name	Date of Birth	Height	Weight	Spike	Block	Club
1	Kotoki Zayasu	11 January 1990	159 cm (5 ft 3 in)	57 kg (126 lb)	270 cm (8 ft 10 in)	255 cm (8 ft 4 in)	Hisamitsu Springs
2	Hitomi Nakamichi	18 September 1985	159 cm (5 ft 3 in)	53 kg (117 lb)	270 cm (8 ft 10 in)	256 cm (8 ft 5 in)	Toray Arrows
3	Yoshie Takeshita	18 March 1978	159 cm (5 ft 3 in)	53 kg (117 lb)	280 cm (9 ft 2 in)	270 cm (8 ft 10 in)	JT Marvelous
4	Yuki Ishikawa	26 April 1987	181 cm (5 ft 11 in)	68 kg (150 lb)	302 cm (9 ft 11 in)	286 cm (9 ft 5 in)	JT Marvelous
5	Ai Yamamoto	24 March 1982	184 cm (6 ft 0 in)	68 kg (150 lb)	312 cm (10 ft 3 in)	305 cm (10 ft 0 in)	JT Marvelous
6	Yuko Sano	26 July 1979	159 cm (5 ft 3 in)	54 kg (119 lb)	260 cm (8 ft 6 in)	250 cm (8 ft 2 in)	Denso Airybees
7	Mai Yamaguchi	3 July 1983	176 cm (5 ft 9 in)	62 kg (137 lb)	304 cm (10 ft 0 in)	292 cm (9 ft 7 in)	Okayama Seagulls
8	Makoto Matsuura	9 September 1986	173 cm (5 ft 8 in)	69 kg (152 lb)	282 cm (9 ft 3 in)	265 cm (8 ft 8 in)	NEC Red Rockets
9	Mizuho Ishida	22 January 1988	174 cm (5 ft 9 in)	65 kg (143 lb)	301 cm (9 ft 11 in)	286 cm (9 ft 5 in)	Denso Airybees
10	Nana Iwasaka	3 July 1990	187 cm (6 ft 2 in)	72 kg (159 lb)	300 cm (9 ft 10 in)	285 cm (9 ft 4 in)	Hisamitsu Seiyaku Springs
11	Erika Araki	3 August 1984	186 cm (6 ft 1 in)	78 kg (172 lb)	307 cm (10 ft 1 in)	295 cm (9 ft 8 in)	Ageo Medics
12	Saori Kimura	19 August 1986	185 cm (6 ft 1 in)	65 kg (143 lb)	304 cm (10 ft 0 in)	293 cm (9 ft 7 in)	Toray Arrows
13	Risa Shinnabe	11 July 1990	173 cm (5 ft 8 in)	66 kg (146 lb)	295 cm (9 ft 8 in)	268 cm (8 ft 10 in)	Hisamitsu Seiyaku Springs
14	Yukiko Ebata	7 November 1989	176 cm (5 ft 9 in)	67 kg (148 lb)	305 cm (10 ft 0 in)	298 cm (9 ft 9 in)	Racing Club Cannes
15	Maiko Kano	15 July 1988	185 cm (6 ft 1 in)	72 kg (159 lb)	303 cm (9 ft 11 in)	285 cm (9 ft 4 in)	Hisamitsu Seiyaku Springs
16	Saori Sakoda	18 December 1987	175 cm (5 ft 9 in)	63 kg (139 lb)	305 cm (10 ft 0 in)	279 cm (9 ft 2 in)	Toray Arrows
17	Akiko Ino	28 September 1986	168 cm (5 ft 6 in)	59 kg (130 lb)	270 cm (8 ft 10 in)	260 cm (8 ft 6 in)	NEC Red Rockets
18	Yuki Ishii	8 May 1991	180 cm (5 ft 11 in)	68 kg (150 lb)	302 cm (9 ft 11 in)	286 cm (9 ft 5 in)	Hisamitsu Springs
19	Kanari Hamaguchi	29 August 1985	167 cm (5 ft 6 in)	60 kg (130 lb)	283 cm (9 ft 3 in)	269 cm (8 ft 10 in)	Toray Arrows
20	Ayano Nakaoji	24 July 1991	167 cm (5 ft 6 in)	64 kg (141 lb)	289 cm (9 ft 6 in)	279 cm (9 ft 2 in)	Hisamitsu Seiyaku Springs

== Kazakhstan ==
The following is the Kazakhstan roster in the 2011 FIVB World Grand Prix.

#	Name	Date of Birth	Height	Weight	Spike	Block	Club
1	Yana Petrenko	30 July 1990	181 cm (5 ft 11 in)	71 kg (157 lb)	297 cm (9 ft 9 in)	265 cm (8 ft 8 in)	Almaty
2	Tatyana Pyurova	5 April 1982	180 cm (5 ft 11 in)	66 kg (146 lb)	298 cm (9 ft 9 in)	294 cm (9 ft 8 in)	Zhetyssu
3	Sana Anarkulova	21 July 1989	188 cm (6 ft 2 in)	77 kg (170 lb)	300 cm (9 ft 10 in)	280 cm (9 ft 2 in)	ALMATY
4	Antonina Rubtsova	30 December 1984	184 cm (6 ft 0 in)	67 kg (148 lb)	302 cm (9 ft 11 in)	275 cm (9 ft 0 in)	Irtysh Kazchrome
5	Olga Nassedkina	28 December 1982	190 cm (6 ft 3 in)	75 kg (165 lb)	305 cm (10 ft 0 in)	255 cm (8 ft 4 in)	ZHETYSSU
6	Kristina Trubina	5 November 1986	178 cm (5 ft 10 in)	64 kg (141 lb)	295 cm (9 ft 8 in)	270 cm (8 ft 10 in)	Astana
7	Alena Ivanova	19 June 1989	195 cm (6 ft 5 in)	78 kg (172 lb)	310 cm (10 ft 2 in)	300 cm (9 ft 10 in)	Zhetyssu
8	Korinna Ishimtseva	8 February 1984	187 cm (6 ft 2 in)	69 kg (152 lb)	300 cm (9 ft 10 in)	280 cm (9 ft 2 in)	Zhetyssu
9	Irina Lukomskaya	19 March 1991	176 cm (5 ft 9 in)	66 kg (146 lb)	280 cm (9 ft 2 in)	270 cm (8 ft 10 in)	Voronezh
10	Yelena Ezau	9 March 1983	174 cm (5 ft 9 in)	57 kg (126 lb)	265 cm (8 ft 8 in)	260 cm (8 ft 6 in)	Irtysh Kazchrome
11	Marina Storozhenko	6 June 1985	175 cm (5 ft 9 in)	57 kg (126 lb)	290 cm (9 ft 6 in)	280 cm (9 ft 2 in)	Zhetyssu
12	Yekaterina Zhdanova	28 May 1992	183 cm (6 ft 0 in)	65 kg (143 lb)	280 cm (9 ft 2 in)	270 cm (8 ft 10 in)	Karaganda
13	Radmila Beresneva	6 June 1983	185 cm (6 ft 1 in)	70 kg (150 lb)	300 cm (9 ft 10 in)	295 cm (9 ft 8 in)	Irtysh-Kazchrom
14	Zarina Sitkazinova	20 March 1993	182 cm (6 ft 0 in)	70 kg (150 lb)	295 cm (9 ft 8 in)	280 cm (9 ft 2 in)	Astana
15	Irina Shenberger	20 February 1992	180 cm (5 ft 11 in)	73 kg (161 lb)	290 cm (9 ft 6 in)	280 cm (9 ft 2 in)	Astana
16	Inna Matveyeva	12 October 1978	186 cm (6 ft 1 in)	70 kg (150 lb)	303 cm (9 ft 11 in)	294 cm (9 ft 8 in)	Irtysh-Kazchrom
17	Olga Drobyshevskaya	22 September 1985	185 cm (6 ft 1 in)	75 kg (165 lb)	305 cm (10 ft 0 in)	293 cm (9 ft 7 in)	Zhetyssu
18	Natalya Akilova	31 May 1993	183 cm (6 ft 0 in)	62 kg (137 lb)	295 cm (9 ft 8 in)	275 cm (9 ft 0 in)	KARAGANDA
19	Natalya Kulinich	19 July 1988	173 cm (5 ft 8 in)	66 kg (146 lb)	280 cm (9 ft 2 in)	275 cm (9 ft 0 in)	Irtysh Kazchrome
20	Inna Shkurina	20 October 1993	178 cm (5 ft 10 in)	65 kg (143 lb)	276 cm (9 ft 1 in)	266 cm (8 ft 9 in)	Shygys-SvinetsStroy

== South Korea ==
The following is the South Korea roster in the 2011 FIVB World Grand Prix.

#	Name	Date of Birth	Height	Weight	Spike	Block	Club
1	Kim Min-Ji	25 May 1985	187 cm (6 ft 2 in)	75 kg (165 lb)	304 cm (10 ft 0 in)	296 cm (9 ft 9 in)	GS Caltex
2	Park Seul-Gi	25 February 1991	178 cm (5 ft 10 in)	65 kg (143 lb)	290 cm (9 ft 6 in)	284 cm (9 ft 4 in)	Hyundai
3	Han Soo-Ji	1 February 1989	182 cm (6 ft 0 in)	78 kg (172 lb)	305 cm (10 ft 0 in)	296 cm (9 ft 9 in)	Korea Ginseng Corp.
4	Hwang Youn-Joo	13 August 1986	177 cm (5 ft 10 in)	68 kg (150 lb)	303 cm (9 ft 11 in)	294 cm (9 ft 8 in)	Hyundai Construction
5	Kim Hae-Ran	16 March 1984	168 cm (5 ft 6 in)	60 kg (130 lb)	280 cm (9 ft 2 in)	270 cm (8 ft 10 in)	Korea Expressway
6	Lee So-Jin	28 August 1987	178 cm (5 ft 10 in)	63 kg (139 lb)	280 cm (9 ft 2 in)	265 cm (8 ft 8 in)	IBK
7	Yoon Hye-Suk	19 June 1983	174 cm (5 ft 9 in)	60 kg (130 lb)	293 cm (9 ft 7 in)	283 cm (9 ft 3 in)	Hyundai
8	Nam Jie-Youn	25 May 1983	172 cm (5 ft 8 in)	63 kg (139 lb)	285 cm (9 ft 4 in)	273 cm (8 ft 11 in)	IBK
9	Yim Myung-Ok	5 May 1986	176 cm (5 ft 9 in)	65 kg (143 lb)	278 cm (9 ft 1 in)	266 cm (8 ft 9 in)	Korea Expressway Corp.
10	Kim Yeon-Koung	26 February 1988	192 cm (6 ft 4 in)	73 kg (161 lb)	307 cm (10 ft 1 in)	299 cm (9 ft 10 in)	FENERBAHCE
11	Jang Young-Eun	30 October 1993	182 cm (6 ft 0 in)	68 kg (150 lb)	290 cm (9 ft 6 in)	270 cm (8 ft 10 in)	Korea Ginseng Corp.
12	Han Song-Yi	5 September 1984	186 cm (6 ft 1 in)	65 kg (143 lb)	305 cm (10 ft 0 in)	298 cm (9 ft 9 in)	GS Caltex
13	Lee Bo-Lam	8 August 1988	185 cm (6 ft 1 in)	75 kg (165 lb)	283 cm (9 ft 3 in)	274 cm (9 ft 0 in)	Korea Highway Corp.
14	La Hea-Won	28 June 1986	184 cm (6 ft 0 in)	73 kg (161 lb)	302 cm (9 ft 11 in)	294 cm (9 ft 8 in)	GS Caltex
15	Kim Se-Young	4 June 1981	190 cm (6 ft 3 in)	73 kg (161 lb)	309 cm (10 ft 2 in)	300 cm (9 ft 10 in)	Hyundai Construction
16	Bae Yoo-Na	30 November 1989	180 cm (5 ft 11 in)	67 kg (148 lb)	303 cm (9 ft 11 in)	294 cm (9 ft 8 in)	GS Caltex
17	Kim Hye-Jin	17 February 1989	180 cm (5 ft 11 in)	62 kg (137 lb)	284 cm (9 ft 4 in)	274 cm (9 ft 0 in)	Heungkuk Life Insurance
18	Kim Hee-Jin	29 April 1991	185 cm (6 ft 1 in)	77 kg (170 lb)	300 cm (9 ft 10 in)	295 cm (9 ft 8 in)	IBK
19	Hwang Min-Kyoung	2 June 1990	174 cm (5 ft 9 in)	64 kg (141 lb)	290 cm (9 ft 6 in)	282 cm (9 ft 3 in)	Korea Highway Corp.
20	Lee Sook-Ja	17 June 1980	175 cm (5 ft 9 in)	58 kg (128 lb)	286 cm (9 ft 5 in)	264 cm (8 ft 8 in)	GS Caltex

== Peru ==
The following is the Peru roster in the 2011 FIVB World Grand Prix.

#	Name	Date of Birth	Height	Weight	Spike	Block	Club
1	Angelica Aquino	10 August 1990	170 cm (5 ft 7 in)	65 kg (143 lb)	279 cm (9 ft 2 in)	268 cm (8 ft 10 in)	Regatas Lima
2	Mirtha Uribe	12 March 1985	184 cm (6 ft 0 in)	67 kg (148 lb)	297 cm (9 ft 9 in)	286 cm (9 ft 5 in)	Deportivo Jaamsa
3	Paola Garcia	25 August 1987	186 cm (6 ft 1 in)	75 kg (165 lb)	300 cm (9 ft 10 in)	298 cm (9 ft 9 in)	DIVINO MAESTRO
4	Patricia Soto	10 February 1980	179 cm (5 ft 10 in)	67 kg (148 lb)	300 cm (9 ft 10 in)	295 cm (9 ft 8 in)	CLUB DE REGATAS LIMA
5	Vanessa Palacios	3 July 1984	167 cm (5 ft 6 in)	66 kg (146 lb)	275 cm (9 ft 0 in)	260 cm (8 ft 6 in)	DIVINO MAESTRO
6	Jessenia Uceda	14 August 1981	178 cm (5 ft 10 in)	69 kg (152 lb)	304 cm (10 ft 0 in)	294 cm (9 ft 8 in)	DEPORTIVO GEMINIS
7	Yulissa Zamudio Ore	24 March 1976	184 cm (6 ft 0 in)	61 kg (134 lb)	315 cm (10 ft 4 in)	300 cm (9 ft 10 in)	U. San Martin de Porres
8	Milagros Moy	17 October 1975	175 cm (5 ft 9 in)	66 kg (146 lb)	296 cm (9 ft 9 in)	285 cm (9 ft 4 in)	CLUB CASTELLANA - ITALIA
9	Raffaella Camet	14 September 1992	184 cm (6 ft 0 in)	67 kg (148 lb)	289 cm (9 ft 6 in)	285 cm (9 ft 4 in)	Club Sporting Cristal
10	Luren Baylon Francis	14 August 1977	180 cm (5 ft 11 in)	68 kg (150 lb)	310 cm (10 ft 2 in)	305 cm (10 ft 0 in)	CV CIUTADELLA
11	Clarivett Yllescas	11 August 1993	185 cm (6 ft 1 in)	63 kg (139 lb)	305 cm (10 ft 0 in)	295 cm (9 ft 8 in)	Club Univ. Cesar Vallejo
12	Carla Rueda	19 April 1990	184 cm (6 ft 0 in)	70 kg (150 lb)	312 cm (10 ft 3 in)	306 cm (10 ft 0 in)	Deportivo Géminis
13	Zoila La Rosa	31 May 1990	176 cm (5 ft 9 in)	57 kg (126 lb)	285 cm (9 ft 4 in)	280 cm (9 ft 2 in)	U. San Martin De Porres
14	Elena Keldibekova	23 June 1974	177 cm (5 ft 10 in)	72 kg (159 lb)	289 cm (9 ft 6 in)	280 cm (9 ft 2 in)	REGATAS LIMA
15	Karla Ortiz	20 October 1991	182 cm (6 ft 0 in)	60 kg (130 lb)	300 cm (9 ft 10 in)	290 cm (9 ft 6 in)	Club Sporting Cristal
16	Alexandra Muñoz	16 August 1992	177 cm (5 ft 10 in)	63 kg (139 lb)	287 cm (9 ft 5 in)	281 cm (9 ft 3 in)	DIVINO MAESTRO
17	Brenda Daniela Uribe	11 December 1993	183 cm (6 ft 0 in)	63 kg (139 lb)	297 cm (9 ft 9 in)	282 cm (9 ft 3 in)	DEPORTIVO ALIANZA
18	Carla Tristan	29 January 1988	180 cm (5 ft 11 in)	67 kg (148 lb)	297 cm (9 ft 9 in)	295 cm (9 ft 8 in)	ALIANZA LIMA
19	Gisela Duarte	21 November 1977	191 cm (6 ft 3 in)	78 kg (172 lb)	297 cm (9 ft 9 in)	292 cm (9 ft 7 in)	Regatas Lima
20	Sandra Guibert	11 June 1989	177 cm (5 ft 10 in)	65 kg (143 lb)	295 cm (9 ft 8 in)	287 cm (9 ft 5 in)	Universidad Cesar Vallejo

== Poland ==
The following is the Poland roster in the 2011 FIVB World Grand Prix.

#	Name	Date of Birth	Height	Weight	Spike	Block	Club
1	Anna Podolec	30 October 1985	193 cm (6 ft 4 in)	71 kg (157 lb)	318 cm (10 ft 5 in)	305 cm (10 ft 0 in)	Avtodor-Metar
2	Katarzyna Konieczna	22 March 1985	184 cm (6 ft 0 in)	75 kg (165 lb)	304 cm (10 ft 0 in)	288 cm (9 ft 5 in)	Impel Volleyball
3	Karolina Rozycka	28 June 1985	183 cm (6 ft 0 in)	68 kg (150 lb)	305 cm (10 ft 0 in)	284 cm (9 ft 4 in)	Yesilyurt
4	Izabela Belcik	29 November 1980	185 cm (6 ft 1 in)	65 kg (143 lb)	304 cm (10 ft 0 in)	292 cm (9 ft 7 in)	Atom Trefl
5	Berenika Tomsia	18 March 1988	188 cm (6 ft 2 in)	72 kg (159 lb)	310 cm (10 ft 2 in)	302 cm (9 ft 11 in)	FENERBAHCE
6	Magdalena Saad	14 May 1985	168 cm (5 ft 6 in)	55 kg (121 lb)	277 cm (9 ft 1 in)	261 cm (8 ft 7 in)	AZS Bialystok
7	Kinga Kasprzak	12 June 1987	188 cm (6 ft 2 in)	76 kg (168 lb)	310 cm (10 ft 2 in)	295 cm (9 ft 8 in)	Bank BPS Muszynianka
8	Klaudia Kaczorowska	20 December 1988	184 cm (6 ft 0 in)	68 kg (150 lb)	303 cm (9 ft 11 in)	281 cm (9 ft 3 in)	Atom Trefl
9	Joanna Kapturska	4 July 1986	185 cm (6 ft 1 in)	67 kg (148 lb)	307 cm (10 ft 1 in)	293 cm (9 ft 7 in)	BKS Aluprof
10	Sylwia Pelc	30 November 1990	189 cm (6 ft 2 in)	85 kg (187 lb)	312 cm (10 ft 3 in)	293 cm (9 ft 7 in)	GCB Centrostal
11	Anna Werblinska	14 May 1984	178 cm (5 ft 10 in)	66 kg (146 lb)	308 cm (10 ft 1 in)	292 cm (9 ft 7 in)	Bank BPS Muszynianka
12	Milena Radecka	18 October 1984	177 cm (5 ft 10 in)	65 kg (143 lb)	302 cm (9 ft 11 in)	295 cm (9 ft 8 in)	Azerrail
13	Paulina Maj	22 March 1987	166 cm (5 ft 5 in)	58 kg (128 lb)	277 cm (9 ft 1 in)	255 cm (8 ft 4 in)	Bank BPS Muszynianka Fakro
14	Joanna Wolosz	7 April 1990	181 cm (5 ft 11 in)	65 kg (143 lb)	303 cm (9 ft 11 in)	281 cm (9 ft 3 in)	Yamamay Busto Arsizio
15	Katarzyna Gajgal	21 September 1981	190 cm (6 ft 3 in)	85 kg (187 lb)	300 cm (9 ft 10 in)	287 cm (9 ft 5 in)	Bank BPS Muszynianka
16	Zuzanna Efimienko	8 August 1989	197 cm (6 ft 6 in)	72 kg (159 lb)	318 cm (10 ft 5 in)	303 cm (9 ft 11 in)	Atom Trefl
17	Joanna Kaczor	16 September 1984	191 cm (6 ft 3 in)	64 kg (141 lb)	305 cm (10 ft 0 in)	290 cm (9 ft 6 in)	Tauron MKS
18	Aleksandra Kruk	29 October 1984	181 cm (5 ft 11 in)	76 kg (168 lb)	298 cm (9 ft 9 in)	285 cm (9 ft 4 in)	AZS Bialystok
19	Maja Tokarska	22 February 1991	193 cm (6 ft 4 in)	72 kg (159 lb)	303 cm (9 ft 11 in)	292 cm (9 ft 7 in)	Atom Trefl
20	Anita Kwiatkowska	5 March 1985	182 cm (6 ft 0 in)	59 kg (130 lb)	291 cm (9 ft 7 in)	277 cm (9 ft 1 in)	Budowlani

== Russia ==
The following is the Russia roster in the 2011 FIVB World Grand Prix.

#	Name	Date of Birth	Height	Weight	Spike	Block	Club
1	Maria Borisenko	8 March 1986	190 cm (6 ft 3 in)	80 kg (180 lb)	301 cm (9 ft 11 in)	297 cm (9 ft 9 in)	Dinamo-Kazan
2	Lesya Makhno	4 September 1981	188 cm (6 ft 2 in)	73 kg (161 lb)	310 cm (10 ft 2 in)	305 cm (10 ft 0 in)	Dinamo-Kazan
3	Maria Perepelkina	9 March 1984	187 cm (6 ft 2 in)	72 kg (159 lb)	304 cm (10 ft 0 in)	300 cm (9 ft 10 in)	Dinamo Moscow
4	Ekaterina Osichkina	2 April 1986	190 cm (6 ft 3 in)	80 kg (180 lb)	307 cm (10 ft 1 in)	300 cm (9 ft 10 in)	Dinamo-Krasnodar
5	Victoria Kuzyakina	1 June 1985	175 cm (5 ft 9 in)	70 kg (150 lb)	290 cm (9 ft 6 in)	287 cm (9 ft 5 in)	Omichka
6	Olga Bukreeva	15 February 1987	187 cm (6 ft 2 in)	70 kg (150 lb)	302 cm (9 ft 11 in)	298 cm (9 ft 9 in)	Dinamo Krasnodar
7	Svetlana Kryuchkova	21 February 1985	174 cm (5 ft 9 in)	63 kg (139 lb)	290 cm (9 ft 6 in)	286 cm (9 ft 5 in)	Dinamo Krasnodar
8	Nataliya Goncharova	1 June 1989	196 cm (6 ft 5 in)	75 kg (165 lb)	315 cm (10 ft 4 in)	306 cm (10 ft 0 in)	Dinamo Moscow
9	Olga Fateeva	4 May 1984	190 cm (6 ft 3 in)	72 kg (159 lb)	310 cm (10 ft 2 in)	303 cm (9 ft 11 in)	Atom
10	Iuliia Morozova	8 January 1985	192 cm (6 ft 4 in)	79 kg (174 lb)	305 cm (10 ft 0 in)	301 cm (9 ft 11 in)	Dinamo Moscow
11	Ekaterina Gamova	17 October 1980	205 cm (6 ft 9 in)	80 kg (180 lb)	321 cm (10 ft 6 in)	310 cm (10 ft 2 in)	Dinamo-Kazan
12	Vera Vetrova-Ulyakina	21 August 1986	180 cm (5 ft 11 in)	73 kg (161 lb)	298 cm (9 ft 9 in)	293 cm (9 ft 7 in)	Dinamo Moscow
13	Evgeniya Startseva	12 February 1989	185 cm (6 ft 1 in)	68 kg (150 lb)	294 cm (9 ft 8 in)	290 cm (9 ft 6 in)	Dinamo-Kazan
14	Ekaterina Ulanova	5 August 1986	172 cm (5 ft 8 in)	61 kg (134 lb)	298 cm (9 ft 9 in)	290 cm (9 ft 6 in)	Dinamo-Kazan
15	Tatiana Kosheleva	23 December 1988	191 cm (6 ft 3 in)	67 kg (148 lb)	315 cm (10 ft 4 in)	305 cm (10 ft 0 in)	Dinamo Krasnodar
16	Iuliia Merkulova	17 February 1984	202 cm (6 ft 8 in)	75 kg (165 lb)	317 cm (10 ft 5 in)	308 cm (10 ft 1 in)	Dinamo Krasnodar
17	Ekaterina Chernova	26 January 1986	178 cm (5 ft 10 in)	68 kg (150 lb)	292 cm (9 ft 7 in)	290 cm (9 ft 6 in)	Uralochka
18	Ekaterina Kosianenko	2 February 1990	178 cm (5 ft 10 in)	64 kg (141 lb)	290 cm (9 ft 6 in)	285 cm (9 ft 4 in)	Zarechie-Odinzovo
19	Irina Uraleva	14 June 1990	170 cm (5 ft 7 in)	65 kg (143 lb)	285 cm (9 ft 4 in)	275 cm (9 ft 0 in)	Proton
20	Anna Matienko	12 July 1981	182 cm (6 ft 0 in)	68 kg (150 lb)	298 cm (9 ft 9 in)	292 cm (9 ft 7 in)	Uralochka

== Serbia ==
The following is the Serbia roster in the 2011 FIVB World Grand Prix.

#	Name	Date of Birth	Height	Weight	Spike	Block	Club
1	Ana Lazarevic	4 July 1991	186 cm (6 ft 1 in)	74 kg (163 lb)	280 cm (9 ft 2 in)	268 cm (8 ft 10 in)	Vizura Beograd (SRB)
2	Jovana Brakočević	5 March 1988	196 cm (6 ft 5 in)	82 kg (181 lb)	309 cm (10 ft 2 in)	295 cm (9 ft 8 in)	VAKIFBANK Istanbul (TUR)
3	Sanja Malagurski	8 June 1990	193 cm (6 ft 4 in)	74 kg (163 lb)	305 cm (10 ft 0 in)	295 cm (9 ft 8 in)	OSASCO VC (BRA)
4	Bojana Živković	29 March 1988	186 cm (6 ft 1 in)	72 kg (159 lb)	292 cm (9 ft 7 in)	284 cm (9 ft 4 in)	ILLER Bankasi Istanbul (TUR)
5	Nataša Krsmanović	19 June 1985	188 cm (6 ft 2 in)	73 kg (161 lb)	305 cm (10 ft 0 in)	285 cm (9 ft 4 in)	RABITA Baku (AZE)
6	Tijana Malešević	18 March 1991	185 cm (6 ft 1 in)	78 kg (172 lb)	300 cm (9 ft 10 in)	286 cm (9 ft 5 in)	VBC Volero Zurich (SUI)
7	Brižitka Molnar	28 July 1985	182 cm (6 ft 0 in)	69 kg (152 lb)	304 cm (10 ft 0 in)	290 cm (9 ft 6 in)	ATOM TREFL (POL)
8	Ana Antonijević	26 August 1987	185 cm (6 ft 1 in)	70 kg (150 lb)	295 cm (9 ft 8 in)	283 cm (9 ft 3 in)	RC DE CANNES Cannes (FRA)
9	Jovana Vesović	21 June 1987	182 cm (6 ft 0 in)	68 kg (150 lb)	283 cm (9 ft 3 in)	268 cm (8 ft 10 in)	Tomis Constanta (ROM)
10	Maja Ognjenović	6 August 1984	183 cm (6 ft 0 in)	67 kg (148 lb)	290 cm (9 ft 6 in)	270 cm (8 ft 10 in)	CHEMIC Police SA (POL)
11	Vesna Đurišić	3 February 1979	187 cm (6 ft 2 in)	75 kg (165 lb)	305 cm (10 ft 0 in)	300 cm (9 ft 10 in)	Galatasaray Istanbul (TUR)
12	Jelena Nikolić	13 April 1982	194 cm (6 ft 4 in)	79 kg (174 lb)	315 cm (10 ft 4 in)	300 cm (9 ft 10 in)	VAKIFBANK Istanbul (TUR)
13	Ana Bjelica	3 April 1992	190 cm (6 ft 3 in)	78 kg (172 lb)	310 cm (10 ft 2 in)	305 cm (10 ft 0 in)	CHEMIC Police SA (POL)
14	Nađa Ninković	1 November 1991	192 cm (6 ft 4 in)	77 kg (170 lb)	307 cm (10 ft 1 in)	298 cm (9 ft 9 in)	Volero Zürich
15	Jovana Stevanović	30 June 1992	192 cm (6 ft 4 in)	72 kg (159 lb)	308 cm (10 ft 1 in)	295 cm (9 ft 8 in)	VBC Pallavollo Rosa ssdrl (ITA
16	Milena Rašić	25 October 1990	191 cm (6 ft 3 in)	72 kg (159 lb)	303 cm (9 ft 11 in)	293 cm (9 ft 7 in)	RC CANNES Cannes (FRA)
17	Stefana Veljković	9 January 1990	190 cm (6 ft 3 in)	76 kg (168 lb)	320 cm (10 ft 6 in)	305 cm (10 ft 0 in)	GALATASARAY Istanbul (TUR)
18	Suzana Ćebić	9 November 1984	167 cm (5 ft 6 in)	60 kg (130 lb)	279 cm (9 ft 2 in)	255 cm (8 ft 4 in)	LOKOMOTIV Baku (AZE)
19	Silvija Popović	15 March 1986	178 cm (5 ft 10 in)	65 kg (143 lb)	276 cm (9 ft 1 in)	266 cm (8 ft 9 in)	Volero Zürich (SUI)
20	Nina Rosić	5 May 1990	172 cm (5 ft 8 in)	61 kg (134 lb)	277 cm (9 ft 1 in)	261 cm (8 ft 7 in)	VBC Volero Zurich (SUI)

== Thailand ==
The following is the Thailand roster in the 2011 FIVB World Grand Prix.

#	Name	Date of Birth	Height	Weight	Spike	Block	Club
1	Wanna Buakaew	2 January 1981	173 cm (5 ft 8 in)	54 kg (119 lb)	292 cm (9 ft 7 in)	277 cm (9 ft 1 in)	Idea khonkaen VC
2	Piyanut Pannoy	10 November 1989	171 cm (5 ft 7 in)	68 kg (150 lb)	280 cm (9 ft 2 in)	275 cm (9 ft 0 in)	Supreme VC
3	Rasamee Supamool	10 January 1992	178 cm (5 ft 10 in)	68 kg (150 lb)	285 cm (9 ft 4 in)	276 cm (9 ft 1 in)	Chang
4	Hattaya Bamrungsuk	12 August 1993	180 cm (5 ft 11 in)	62 kg (137 lb)	289 cm (9 ft 6 in)	275 cm (9 ft 0 in)	Chang
5	Pleumjit Thinkaow	9 November 1983	180 cm (5 ft 11 in)	63 kg (139 lb)	298 cm (9 ft 9 in)	281 cm (9 ft 3 in)	Bangkok Glass VC
6	Onuma Sittirak	13 June 1986	176 cm (5 ft 9 in)	72 kg (159 lb)	304 cm (10 ft 0 in)	285 cm (9 ft 4 in)	JT Marvelous
7	Patcharee Deesamer	3 February 1989	180 cm (5 ft 11 in)	74 kg (163 lb)	306 cm (10 ft 0 in)	293 cm (9 ft 7 in)	Chang
8	Utaiwan Kaensing	7 September 1988	190 cm (6 ft 3 in)	86 kg (190 lb)	310 cm (10 ft 2 in)	295 cm (9 ft 8 in)	Chang
9	Wanitchaya Luangtonglang	8 October 1992	179 cm (5 ft 10 in)	51 kg (112 lb)	295 cm (9 ft 8 in)	280 cm (9 ft 2 in)	Chang
10	Wilavan Apinyapong	6 June 1984	174 cm (5 ft 9 in)	68 kg (150 lb)	294 cm (9 ft 8 in)	282 cm (9 ft 3 in)	Nakornratchasima VC
11	Amporn Hyapha	19 May 1985	180 cm (5 ft 11 in)	70 kg (150 lb)	301 cm (9 ft 11 in)	290 cm (9 ft 6 in)	Nakhonnon VC
12	Tapaphaipun Chaisri	29 November 1989	168 cm (5 ft 6 in)	60 kg (130 lb)	295 cm (9 ft 8 in)	276 cm (9 ft 1 in)	Sisaket VC
13	Nootsara Tomkom	7 July 1985	169 cm (5 ft 7 in)	57 kg (126 lb)	289 cm (9 ft 6 in)	278 cm (9 ft 1 in)	Rabita Baku
14	Ajcharaporn Kongyot	18 June 1995	180 cm (5 ft 11 in)	66 kg (146 lb)	290 cm (9 ft 6 in)	284 cm (9 ft 4 in)	Supreme VC
15	Malika Kanthong	8 January 1987	178 cm (5 ft 10 in)	63 kg (139 lb)	292 cm (9 ft 7 in)	278 cm (9 ft 1 in)	Nakhonnon-3BB VC
16	Pornpun Guedpard	5 May 1993	174 cm (5 ft 9 in)	63 kg (139 lb)	270 cm (8 ft 10 in)	267 cm (8 ft 9 in)	Bangkok Glass VC
17	Kamonporn Sukmak	29 February 1988	174 cm (5 ft 9 in)	63 kg (139 lb)	285 cm (9 ft 4 in)	275 cm (9 ft 0 in)	Chang
18	Em-orn Phanusit	25 March 1988	179 cm (5 ft 10 in)	70 kg (150 lb)	302 cm (9 ft 11 in)	291 cm (9 ft 7 in)	Chang
19	Soraya Phomla	6 August 1992	169 cm (5 ft 7 in)	59 kg (130 lb)	290 cm (9 ft 6 in)	280 cm (9 ft 2 in)	Chang

== United States ==
The following is the United States roster in the 2011 FIVB World Grand Prix.

#	Name	Date of Birth	Height	Weight	Spike	Block	Club
1	Kristin Lynn Hildebrand	30 June 1985	185 cm (6 ft 1 in)	68 kg (150 lb)	300 cm (9 ft 10 in)	284 cm (9 ft 4 in)	Impel Volleyball S.A.
2	Danielle Scott-Arruda	1 October 1972	188 cm (6 ft 2 in)	84 kg (185 lb)	325 cm (10 ft 8 in)	302 cm (9 ft 11 in)	Praia Clube
3	Tayyiba Haneef-Park	23 March 1979	201 cm (6 ft 7 in)	82 kg (181 lb)	328 cm (10 ft 9 in)	312 cm (10 ft 3 in)	Igtisadchi Baku
4	Lindsey Berg	16 July 1980	173 cm (5 ft 8 in)	75 kg (165 lb)	287 cm (9 ft 5 in)	274 cm (9 ft 0 in)	GSO Villa Cortese
5	Tamari Miyashiro	8 July 1987	170 cm (5 ft 7 in)	70 kg (150 lb)	284 cm (9 ft 4 in)	266 cm (8 ft 9 in)	Allianz Volley Stuttgart
6	Nicole Davis	24 April 1982	167 cm (5 ft 6 in)	73 kg (161 lb)	284 cm (9 ft 4 in)	266 cm (8 ft 9 in)	E.S. Cannet Rocheville VB
7	Heather Bown	29 November 1978	188 cm (6 ft 2 in)	90 kg (200 lb)	301 cm (9 ft 11 in)	290 cm (9 ft 6 in)	Azerrail Baku
8	Alisha Glass	5 April 1988	184 cm (6 ft 0 in)	72 kg (159 lb)	305 cm (10 ft 0 in)	300 cm (9 ft 10 in)	Imoco Volley
9	Jennifer Tamas	23 November 1982	191 cm (6 ft 3 in)	82 kg (181 lb)	315 cm (10 ft 4 in)	301 cm (9 ft 11 in)	Azerrail Baku
10	Kimberly Glass	18 August 1984	191 cm (6 ft 3 in)	75 kg (165 lb)	314 cm (10 ft 4 in)	299 cm (9 ft 10 in)	Guangdong Evergrande Club
11	Jordan Larson-Burbach	16 October 1986	190 cm (6 ft 3 in)	75 kg (165 lb)	302 cm (9 ft 11 in)	295 cm (9 ft 8 in)	Eczacibasi Vitra Istanbul
12	Nancy Metcalf	12 November 1978	188 cm (6 ft 2 in)	73 kg (161 lb)	314 cm (10 ft 4 in)	292 cm (9 ft 7 in)	Lokomotiv Baku
13	Christa Harmotto Dietzen	12 October 1986	188 cm (6 ft 2 in)	79 kg (174 lb)	322 cm (10 ft 7 in)	300 cm (9 ft 10 in)	Fenerbahce SK
14	Nicole Fawcett	16 December 1986	196 cm (6 ft 5 in)	82 kg (181 lb)	310 cm (10 ft 2 in)	291 cm (9 ft 7 in)	Fujian Yango Women's VB Club
15	Logan Tom	25 May 1981	186 cm (6 ft 1 in)	80 kg (180 lb)	306 cm (10 ft 0 in)	297 cm (9 ft 9 in)	Fenerbahce Acibadem
16	Foluke Akinradewo	5 October 1987	191 cm (6 ft 3 in)	79 kg (174 lb)	331 cm (10 ft 10 in)	300 cm (9 ft 10 in)	Volero Zurich
17	Mary Spicer	3 July 1987	175 cm (5 ft 9 in)	65 kg (143 lb)	292 cm (9 ft 7 in)	280 cm (9 ft 2 in)	Rabita Baku
18	Megan Easy	15 October 1988	191 cm (6 ft 3 in)	80 kg (180 lb)	320 cm (10 ft 6 in)	297 cm (9 ft 9 in)	Imoco Volley
19	Destinee Hooker	7 September 1987	196 cm (6 ft 5 in)	73 kg (161 lb)	320 cm (10 ft 6 in)	304 cm (10 ft 0 in)	Osasco Voleibol Clube
20	Angela Forsett	6 June 1986	173 cm (5 ft 8 in)	74 kg (163 lb)	320 cm (10 ft 6 in)	315 cm (10 ft 4 in)	Sports Vereingung Schwechat
