= Volleyball at the 2011 Pan American Games – Women's team rosters =

This article shows all participating women's volleyball squads at the 2011 Pan American Games, held from October 15 to 20, 2011 in Guadalajara, Jalisco, Mexico.

== Brazil ==
- Head Coach: José Roberto Guimarães

#	Name	Date of Birth	Height	Weight	Spike	Block
1	Fabiana Claudino (c)	24.01.1985	193	76	314	293
2	Juciely Silva	18.12.1980	184	71	289	285
3	Danielle Lins	05.01.1985	181	68	290	276
4	Paula Pequeno	22.01.1982	184	74	302	285
6	Thaisa Menezes	15.05.1987	196	79	316	301
7	Marianne Steinbrecher	23.08.1983	188	70	310	290
8	Jaqueline Carvalho	31.12.1983	186	70	302	286
11	Tandara Caixeta	30.10.1988	184	87	295	285
13	Sheilla Castro	01.07.1983	185	64	302	284
14	Fabiana de Oliveira	07.03.1980	169	59	276	266
16	Fe Garay	10.05.1986	179	74	308	288
17	Fabiola de Souza	03.02.1983	184	70	300	285

== Canada ==
- Head Coach: Arnd Ludwig

#	Name	Date of Birth	Height	Weight	Spike	Block
1	Tricia Mayba	02.07.1989	186	77	305	287
2	Julie Young	07.03.1986	188	72	287	273
4	Tammy Mahon (c)	04.11.1980	180	76	298	282
6	Claire Hanna	27.04.1986	182	67	291	279
7	Tonya Mokelki	10.05.1985	182	67	309	292
8	Carla Bradstock	11.08.1985	178	68	282	271
12	Sherline Tasha Holness	11.02.1980	188	80	312	295
14	Elizabeth Cordonier	03.03.1987	183	75	304	285
15	Colette Meek	25.07.1986	187	77	321	299
16	Jennifer Hinze	20.05.1988	186	75	306	284
17	Brittney Page	04.02.1984	184	67	305	287
19	Lauren O'Reilly	04.04.1989	178	69	293	273

== Cuba ==
- Head Coach: Juan Carlos Gala

#	Name	Date of Birth	Height	Weight	Spike	Block
1	Wilma Salas	09.03.1991	188	60	313	298
2	Yanelis Santos	30.03.1986	181	71	315	312
3	Alena Rojas	09.08.1992	186	78	320	305
4	Yoana Palacios	06.10.1990	184	72	321	300
6	Daymara Lescay	05.09.1992	184	72	308	290
8	Emily Borrell	19.02.1992	167	55	270	260
10	Ana Cleger	27.11.1989	185	73	315	297
11	Leanny Castañeda	18.10.1986	188	70	325	320
13	Rosanna Giel	10.06.1992	187	62	320	315
14	Kenia Carcaces	22.01.1986	188	69	308	306
15	Yusidey Silié (c)	11.11.1984	183	80	316	300
17	Gyselle Silva	29.10.1991	184	70	302	295

== Dominican Republic ==
- Head Coach: Marcos Kwiek

#	Name	Date of Birth	Height	Weight	Spike	Block
2	Dahiana Burgos	07.04.1985	180	70	305	312
3	Lisvel Elisa Eve	10.09.1991	194	70	305	312
5	Brenda Castillo	05.06.1992	167	55	220	270
7	Niverka Marte	19.10.1990	178	71	275	283
8	Cándida Arias	11.03.1992	191	68	295	301
9	Sidarka Núñez	25.06.1984	188	62	330	315
10	Milagros Cabral (c)	17.10.1978	181	63	325	305
12	Karla Echenique	16.05.1986	180	62	298	295
13	Cindy Rondón	12.11.1988	183	61	312	305
14	Prisilla Rivera	29.12.1984	186	70	312	308
18	Bethania de la Cruz	13.05.1989	188	58	322	305
19	Ana Yorkira Binet	09.02.1992	174	62	267	288

== Mexico ==
- Head Coach: Mario Herrera

#	Name	Date of Birth	Height	Weight	Spike	Block
1	Karla Sainz	22.07.1993	184	75	298	285
4	Nancy Ortega	31.03.1990	172	68	285	273
5	Andrea Rangel	19.05.1993	178	57	292	283
6	Samantha Bricio	22.11.1994	186	58	296	283
7	Laura Daniela Lloreda	30.04.1981	175	80	295	289
10	Martha Revuelta (c)	06.09.1986	178	76	292	281
11	Dulce Carranza	29.06.1990	178	84	287	274
13	Itzel Gaytan	21.10.1992	172	65	270	260
14	Claudia Ríos	22.09.1992	181	68	282	264
16	Alejandra Isiordia	17.04.1994	185	72	283	274
17	Zaira Orellana	03.05.1989	183	65	295	287
18	Gema León	11.03.1991	182	63	290	278

== Peru ==
- Head Coach: Luca Cristofani

#	Name	Date of Birth	Height	Weight	Spike	Block
1	Angélica Aquino	10.08.1990	170	65	279	268
2	Mirtha Uribe	12.03.1985	182	67	297	286
4	Patricia Soto (c)	10.02.1980	179	67	300	295
5	Vanessa Palacios	03.07.1984	167	66	275	268
6	Jessenia Uceda	14.08.1981	178	69	304	300
7	Yulissa Zamudio	24.03.1976	184	61	315	300
10	Luren Baylon	14.08.1977	180	76	295	291
11	Claivett Yllescas	11.08.1993	179	63	305	295
12	Carla Rueda	19.04.1990	180	65	284	280
14	Elena Keldibekova	23.06.1974	177	72	289	280
15	Karla Ortíz	20.10.1991	178	60	300	290
16	Alexandra Muñoz	16.08.1992	177	63	287	281

== Puerto Rico ==
- Head Coach: David Alemán

#	Name	Date of Birth	Height	Weight	Spike	Block
1	Daly Santana	19.02.1995	183	65	300	274
3	Vilmarie Mojica (c)	13.08.1985	180	63	295	274
5	Sarai Álvarez	03.04.1986	185	61	295	286
6	Yarimar Rosa	20.06.1988	178	58	295	285
7	Stephanie Enright	15.12.1990	179	74	309	295
9	Áurea Cruz	10.01.1982	180	63	310	290
10	Diana Reyes	29.04.1993	191	80	303	299
12	Michelle Nogueras	05.12.1988	179	58	275	262
13	Shirley Ferrer	23.06.1991	180	63	290	293
15	Shara Venegas	18.09.1992	172	58	280	270
18	Linda Morales	20.05.1988	188	94	302	296
19	Amanda Vázquez	30.03.1984	185	94	302	297

== United States ==
- Head Coach: John Banachowski

#	Name	Date of Birth	Height	Weight	Spike	Block
2	Kayla Banwarth	21.01.1989	178	75	295	283
3	Keao Burdine	02.01.1983	185	71	306	302
4	Angela Forsett	06.06.1986	173	74	320	315
6	Tamari Miyashiro	08.07.1987	170	70	284	266
8	Cynthia Barboza (c)	07.02.1987	183	68	311	301
10	Lauren Gibbemeyer	08.09.1988	187	71	307	293
11	Regan Hood	10.08.1983	188	81	315	302
12	Alexandra Klineman	30.12.1989	194	73	322	299
13	Cassidy Lichtman	25.05.1989	185	68	299	279
14	Carli Lloyd	06.08.1989	180	75	313	295
15	Courtney Thompson	04.11.1984	170	66	276	263
19	Jessica Jones	15.11.1986	191	67	316	300
