= 2008 Final Four Women's Volleyball Cup squads =

This article shows all participating team squads at the 2008 Final Four Women's Volleyball Cup, held from September 3 to September 7, 2008 in Fortaleza, Brazil.

== Argentina ==
- Head Coach: Horacio Bastit

#	Name	Date of Birth	Height	Weight	Spike	Block
1	Lucía Bertaina
2	Josefina Fernández
4	Leticia Boscacci	08.11.1985
7	Tatiana Rizzo	30.12.1986
8	Georgina Klug (c)
9	Natali Flaviani	08.10.1985	183	72	286	280
11	Ileana Leyendeker	14.10.1986
12	Florencia Busquets
13	Sabrina Segui	12.05.1978	180	68	282	271
15	Lucia Gaido
16	Aylin Pereyra
18	Yael Castiglione

== Brazil ==
- Head Coach: José Roberto Guimarães

#	Name	Date of Birth	Height	Weight	Spike	Block
1	Walewska Oliveira	01.10.1979	190	73	310	290
2	Carolina Albuquerque	25.07.1977	182	76	289	279
3	Marianne Steinbrecher	23.08.1983	188	70	310	290
4	Paula Pequeno	22.01.1982	184	74	302	285
6	Thaisa Menezes	15.05.1987	196	79	316	301
7	Hélia Souza (c)	10.03.1970	173	63	283	264
8	Valeska Menezes	23.04.1976	180	62	302	290
9	Fabiana Claudino	24.01.1985	193	76	314	293
10	Welissa Gonzaga	09.09.1982	179	76	300	287
12	Jaqueline Carvalho	31.12.1983	186	70	302	286
13	Sheilla Castro	01.07.1983	185	64	302	284
14	Fabiana de Oliveira	07.03.1980	169	59	276	266

== Cuba ==
- Head Coach: Luiz Bonilla

#	Name	Date of Birth	Height	Weight	Spike	Block
1	Lilianny Aguero
2	Yanelis Santos (c)	30.03.1986	183	71	315	312
5	Dayesi Maso
6	Wilma Salas
7	Lisbet Arredondo
8	Yoana Palacios
9	Rachel Sánchez	09.01.1989	188	75	325	320
10	Yusleinis Herrera	12.03.1984	180	67	312	310
13	Leanny Castañeda
14	Kenia Carcaces	22.01.1986	188	69	308	306
15	Yusidey Silié	11.11.1984	183	80	316	300
17	Gyselle Silva

== Dominican Republic ==
- Head Coach: Marcos Kwiek

#	Name	Date of Birth	Height	Weight	Spike	Block
1	Annerys Vargas	07.08.1981	194	70	325	315
3	Lisvel Elisa Eve	10.09.1991	189	70	250	287
4	Sidarka Núñez	25.06.1984	188	58	312	308
5	Brenda Castillo	05.06.1992	167	55	220	270
8	Niverka Marte	19.10.1990	178	71	233	283
10	Milagros Cabral	17.10.1978	181	63	308	305
12	Karla Echenique	16.05.1986	181	62	279	273
13	Cindy Rondón	12.11.1988	189	61	312	305
14	Prisilla Rivera	29.12.1984	186	70	312	308
15	Cosiri Rodríguez (c)	30.08.1977	191	72	313	305
17	Altagracia Mambrú	21.01.1986	180	55	312	302
18	Bethania de la Cruz	13.05.1989	188	58	322	305
