= 2012 Volleyball Copa Latina =

2012 Copa Latina
Tournament details
- Host country: Peru
- Dates: March 31 – April 2, 2012
- Teams: 4
- Venue: 1 (in Lima host cities)

Final positions
- Champions: Cuba (2nd title)

Tournament awards
- MVP: Yoana Palacios (CUB)

The 2012 Copa Latina was the fourth edition of the annual women's volleyball tournament, organized by the Peruvian Volleyball Federation and Frecuencia Latina, played by four countries from March 31 – April 2, 2012 in Coliseo Eduardo Dibos, Lima, Peru.

== Purpose ==
- Peru participated in the tournament to test a new team for the Olympic Qualification tournament
- Cuba participated in the tournament as general preparation for the Olympic Qualification tournament
- Dominican Republic participated in the tournament as general preparation for the Olympic Qualification tournament
- Chile participated in the tournament as general preparation for the Olympic Qualification tournament

== Round-robin ==
This edition of the tournament featured only a round-robin system of matches. The team with the most points at the end of the round was declared the winner.

Pos	Team	Pld	W	L	Pts	SPW	SPL	SPR	SW	SL	SR
1	Cuba	3	3	0	9	225	148	1.520	9	0	MAX
2	Dominican Republic	3	2	1	5	233	219	1.064	6	5	1.200
3	Peru	3	1	2	4	241	208	1.159	5	6	0.833
4	Chile	3	0	3	0	101	225	0.449	0	9	0.000

=== Matches ===
Date		Score		Set 1	Set 2	Set 3	Set 4	Set 5	Total
3 Jun	Dominican Republic	0–3	Cuba	19–25	11–25	19–25			49–75
3 Jun	Peru	3–0	Chile	25–10	25–4	25–10			75–24
4 Jun	Cuba	3–0	Chile	25–7	25–18	25–12			75–37
4 Jun	Peru	2–3	Dominican Republic	23–25	26–24	23–25	25–20	7–15	104–109
5 Jun	Dominican Republic	3–0	Chile	25–11	25–14	25–15			75–40
5 Jun	Peru	0–3	Cuba	20–25	22–25	20–25			62–75

== Final standing ==
Rank	Team
1st place, gold medalist(s)	Cuba
2nd place, silver medalist(s)	Dominican Republic
3rd place, bronze medalist(s)	Peru
4	Chile

2011 Copa Latina champions

Cuba
2nd title

== Individual awards ==
- Most valuable player
  - Yoana Palacios (CUB)
- Best scorer
  - Jeoselyna Rodriguez (DOM)
- Best spiker
  - Yoana Palacios (CUB)
- Best blocker
  - Cándida Arias (DOM)
- Best server
  - Alexandra Muñoz (PER)
- Best digger
  - Nicole Vorpahl (CHI)
- Best setter
  - Alexandra Muñoz (PER)
- Best receiver
  - Emily Borrell (CUB)
- Best libero
  - Emily Borrell (CUB)
