= Kulinich =

Kulinich or Kulynych (Ukrainian or Russian: Кулинич) is a gender-neutral Slavic surname that may refer to the following notable people:

- Aleksandr Kulinitš (born 24 May 1992), Estonian football defender
- Anna Kulinich-Sorokina (born 1992), Russian Paralympian athlete
- Mykola Kulinich (born 1953), Ukrainian diplomat
- Natalya Kulinich (born 1988), Kazakhstani volleyball player
- Olha Kulynych (born 2000), Ukrainian racing cyclist
- Sergey Kulinich (born 1960), Russian association football coach and player
- Serhiy Kulynych (born 1995), Ukrainian football defender
