= Tamari Miyashiro =

American volleyball player (born 1987)

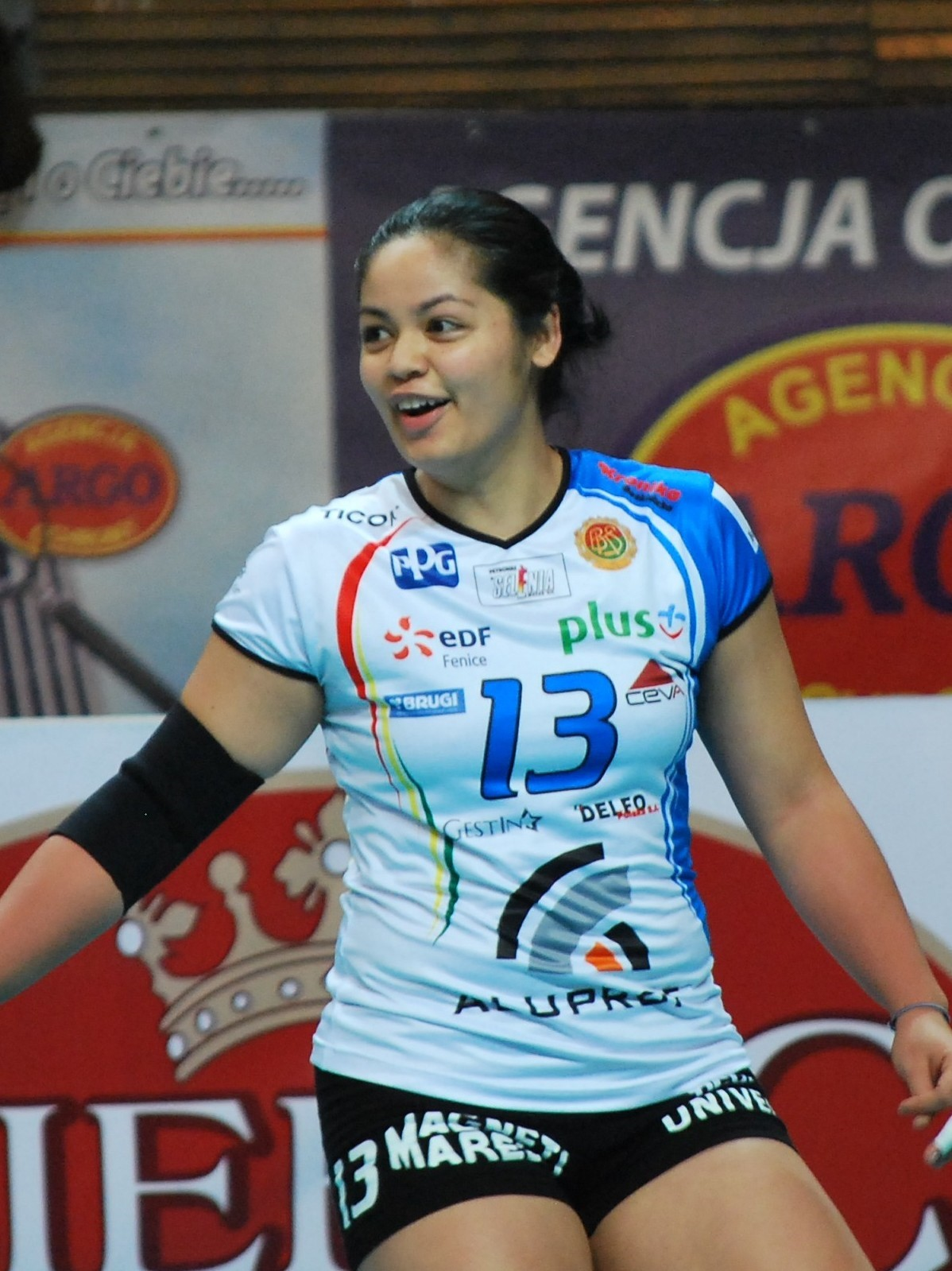

Personal information
- Born: July 8, 1987 (age 39); Honolulu, Hawaii, U.S.
- Hometown: Kaneohe, Hawaii, U.S.
- Height: 5 ft 7 in (1.7 m)
- Spike: 112 in (284 cm)
- Block: 105 in (266 cm)

Volleyball information
- Position: Libero
- Number: 5 (national team)

Career
Years	Teams
2006–09; 2010-11; 2011-12; 2012–13	(United States) University of Washington (Austria) SVS Post Schwechat (Poland) BKS Stal Bielsko-Biala (Azerbaijan) Lokomotiv Baku

National team
2010–2012	United States
Medal record
Women's volleyball
Representing the United States
Olympic Games
Silver medal – second place	2012 London	Team
World Cup
Silver medal – second place	2011 Japan	Team
FIVB World Grand Prix
Gold medal – first place	2011 Macau	Team
Gold medal – first place	2012 Ningbo	Team
Pan American Games
Bronze medal – third place	2011 Guadalajara	Team

Tamari Miyashiro (born July 8, 1987) is an American former indoor volleyball player and coach. As a libero, she was a two-time National Defensive Player of the Year at the University of Washington and played on the United States women's national volleyball team from 2010-2012. She won a silver medal at the 2012 Summer Olympics as a player and helped lead the national team to a gold medal at the 2020 Summer Olympics as an assistant coach.

== Career ==
=== High school ===
Miyashiro played volleyball for four years at Kalani High School. She was a first team All-State selection as a junior and senior and led her team to three league titles. She was the 2004 Hawaii Gatorade Player of the Year.

=== College ===
Miyashiro played on the University of Washington volleyball team from 2006 to 2009. In her first year, she was named to the Pac-10 All-Freshman team. Her 637 digs was the second-highest single-season total in school history. In 2007, she had 622 digs, which was the third-highest mark in school history. She was a first team All-Pac-10 selection and was named the National Defensive Player of the Year by Asics/Volleyball Magazine. In 2008, Miyashiro had 5.14 digs per game to lead the Pac-10 in that category. She was again a first team All-Pac-10 selection and was named National Defensive Player of the Year by UnderArmour/Volleyball Magazine. She finished her college career in 2009 with University of Washington records for career digs (2,382) and digs per set (5.36).

=== International ===
Miyashiro joined the U.S. national team in January 2010. That year, she averaged 4.00 digs per set during the Tour of China, which led the team. She also played for SVS Post Schwechat.

In 2011, Miyashiro helped the Americans win the gold medal in the FIVB World Grand Prix. She started at libero in all five matches at the Pan American Games, where the U.S. finished in third place.

At the 2012 FIVB World Grand Prix, Miyashiro was the team's starting libero in two matches and helped the U.S. win the gold medal. She then won the silver medal with the U.S. in the Olympics.

== Personal ==
Miyashiro was born in Honolulu, Hawaii, and resides in Kaneohe, Hawaii. She graduated from the University of Washington in 2009.

Her mother played volleyball for the University of Hawaii.

== Awards ==
=== College ===
- 2007 Asics/Volleyball Magazine National Defensive Player of the Year
- 2008 UnderArmour/Volleyball Magazine National Defensive Player of the Year
- Two-time AVCA All-American second team (2008, 2009)
- AVCA All-American third team (2007)
- All-Pacific Region first team (2007)
- Two-time All-Pac-10 first team (2007, 2008)
- Pac-10 All-Freshman team (2006)
