= Nicole Vorpahl =

Chilean volleyball player

Personal information
- Nickname: Nico
- Nationality: Chile
- Born: March 8, 1994 (age 32); Chile
- Height: 1.66 m (5 ft 5 1/2 in)
- Weight: 65 kg (143 lb)
- Spike: 253 cm (100 in)
- Block: 249 cm (98 in)

Volleyball information
- Position: Libero
- Current club: (Chile) C.D. Boston College
- Number: 10

National team
2010–	Chile
- Last updated: October 2012

Nicole Vorpahl (born March 8, 1994, in Chile) is a Chilean volleyball player who plays as libero for the Chile national team.

== Personal life ==
Nicole is the younger sister of Chris Vorpahl, her sister Chris is also a volleyball player in Chile.

== Career ==
=== 2011–present ===
Nicole was asked to be the Libero of the Chile national team after Hugo Jauregui, Argentinean coach and former coach of the Argentinean national team, took over. Jauregui set up a team consisting of U19 players to participate as the senior team looking to a 4-year program.

Nicole participated in the 2012 Volleyball Copa Latina in Peru with Chile's U19 team. Chile finished last but Nicole was named Best Digger of the Cup. She also participated with the U19 team at the 2012 Summer Olympics South American Qualification Tournament. Chile again finished last.

After the national team tournaments, Nicole played the 2012 season of the Chilean Volleyball League with her Club, Boston College. Her team won the season and Nicole was named Best Libero.

In October 2012, Nicole and her team finally played in their category at the 2012 Junior South American Championship. Chile for the first time in their history made it to the semifinals, the finished fourth losing the Bronze Medal against Colombia. Nicole again was named Best Libero.

In 2017 Vorpahl played with Chile's National Volleyball team at the South American Championship and finished sixth

== Clubs ==
- (Chile) C.D. Boston College (2010–present)

== Awards ==
=== Individuals ===
- 2012 Copa Latina "Best Digger"
- 2012 Chilean Volleyball League "Best Libero"
- 2012 Junior South American Championship "Best Libero"

=== Clubs ===
- 2012 Chilean Volleyball League – Champion, with C.D. Boston College
