= Gisela Duarte =

Peruvian volleyball player (born 1977)

Gisela Duarte Casas

Personal information
- Nationality: Peruvian
- Born: 21 November 1977 (age 48)
- Height: 187 cm (6 ft 2 in)

Career
Years	Teams
1994	Latino Amisa

National team
1994	Peru

Gisela Duarte Casas (born 21 November 1977) is a retired Peruvian volleyball player. She was part of the Peru women's national volleyball team.

She participated in the 1994 FIVB Volleyball Women's World Championship.

== Clubs ==
- Latino Amisa (1994)
