= Antonina Rubtsova =

Kazakhstani volleyball player (born 1984)

Personal information
- Nationality: Kazakhstani
- Born: 30 December 1984 (age 41)
- Height: 184 cm (72 in)
- Weight: 67 kg (148 lb)
- Spike: 302 cm (119 in)
- Block: 275 cm (108 in)

Volleyball information
- Number: 4 (national team)

Career
Years	Teams
2012	Irtysh Kazchrome

National team
2012	Kazakhstan

Antonina Rubtsova (born 30 December 1984) is a Kazakhstani female volleyball player. She was part of the Kazakhstan women's national volleyball team.

She participated in the 2011 FIVB Volleyball World Grand Prix. On club level she played for Irtysh Kazchrome in 2011.
