= Lee So-jin =

South Korean volleyball player (born 1987)

Lee So-Jin

Personal information
- Nationality: South Korean
- Born: 28 August 1987 (age 39)
- Height: 178 cm (70 in)
- Weight: 63 kg (139 lb)
- Spike: 280 cm (110 in)
- Block: 265 cm (104 in)

Volleyball information
- Number: 6 (national team)

Career
| Years | Teams |
|---|---|
| 2012 | IBK |

National team
| 2012 | South Korea |

Lee So-Jin (born 28 August 1987) is a South Korean female volleyball player. She was part of the South Korea women's national volleyball team.

She participated in the 2011 FIVB Volleyball World Grand Prix. At club level she played for IBK in 2011.
