= Friederike Thieme =

German volleyball player (born 1987)

Personal information
- Nationality: German
- Born: 16 April 1987 (age 39)
- Height: 187 cm (74 in)
- Weight: 73 kg (161 lb)
- Spike: 302 cm (119 in)
- Block: 292 cm (115 in)

Volleyball information
- Number: 22 (national team)

National team
2012	Germany

Friederike Thieme (born 16 April 1987) is a German female volleyball player. She was part of the Germany women's national volleyball team.

She participated in the 2012 FIVB Volleyball World Grand Prix.
