= Cynthia Barboza =

American volleyball player (born 1987)

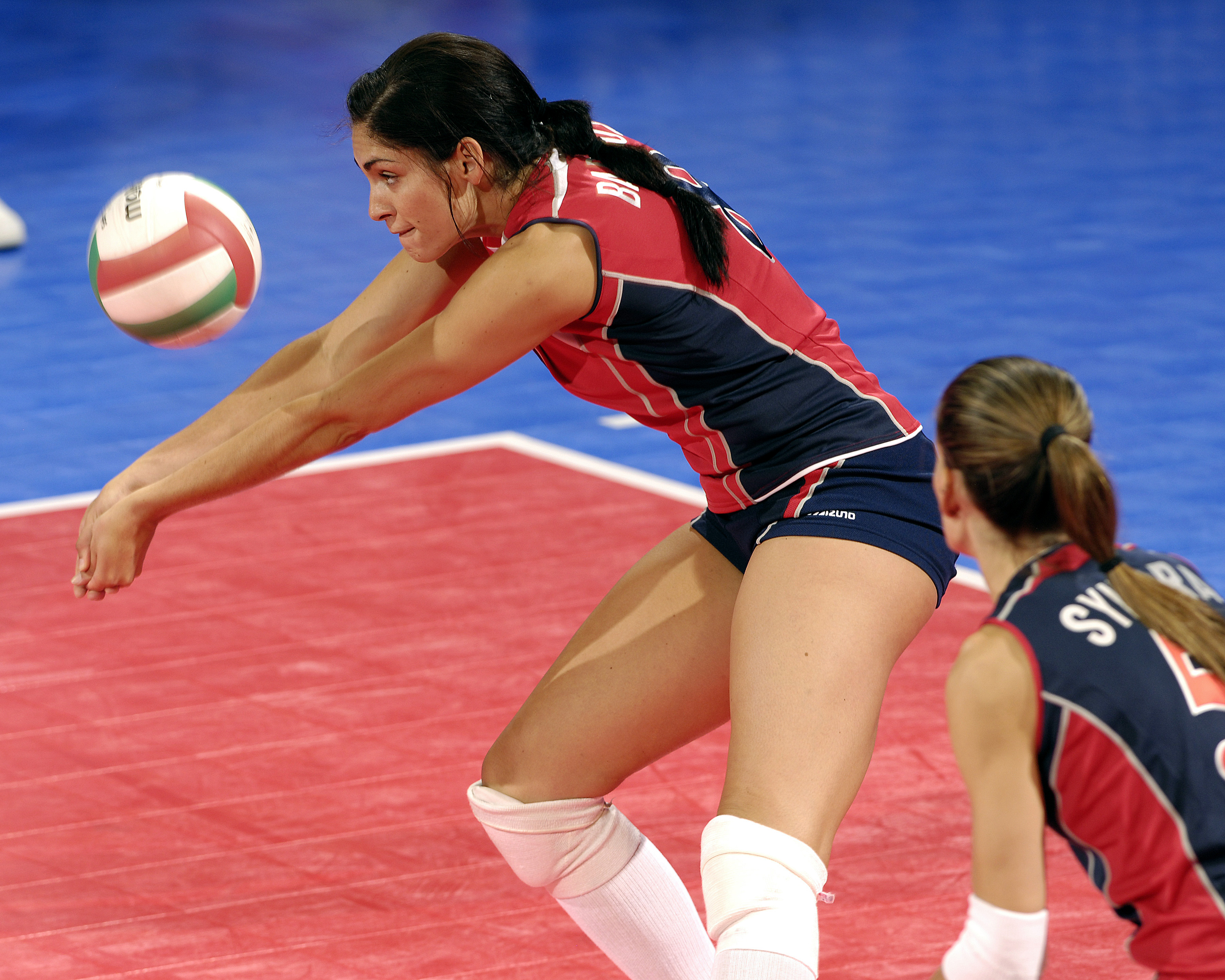

Personal information
- Born: February 7, 1987 (age 39); Santa Ana, California, U.S.
- Height: 6 ft 0 in (1.83 m)
- Spike: 311 cm (122 in)
- Block: 301 cm (119 in)

Volleyball information
- Position: Outside hitter
- Current club: (Italy) LIU•JO Volley Modena

Career
Years	Teams
2005–2008; 2009–10; 2010–11; 2011–12; 2012–2013	(United States) Stanford University (Japan) Toray Arrows (Russia) Dynamo Krasnodar (Italy) LIU•JO Volley Modena (Russia) Ufimochka Ufa

National team
2003–2012	United States
Medal record
Women's volleyball
Representing the United States
Pan American Games
Bronze medal – third place	2003 Santo Domingo	Team
Bronze medal – third place	2007 Rio de Janeiro	Team
Bronze medal – third place	2011 Guadalajara	Team
Pan American Cup
Bronze medal – third place	2010 Rosarito & Tijuana	Team
Final Four Cup
Silver medal – second place	2009 Lima	Team

Cynthia Jane Barboza (born February 7, 1987) is an American retired volleyball player. She is an outside hitter who played at Stanford University for four years.

== High school ==
Barboza was born in Santa Ana, California, and was raised in Long Beach, California where she graduated from Wilson Classical High School and was considered the top high school recruit for the class of 2005. She was the Gatorade National Player of the Year in volleyball 2 years in a row in 2003–04 and 04–05 and was also the overall girls' Gatorade Athlete of the Year in 2005. In 2002, she was on the USA Girls' Youth National Team that won a gold medal at the NORCECA championships in Salt Lake City, Utah, and she was named "best serve-receiver" for the tournament.

In her freshman season in 2001, she was named the National Freshman of the Year by Student Sports Magazine. She was named the 2002 National Sophomore of the Year by the same publication. In 2004, she hit .537 for the season, compiling 14 matches with an attack efficiency greater than .650 and four matches in which she hit better than .800. Her best effort of the season (.840) came against State Champion Mira Costa High School. In 2004, she averaged 18.3 kills, 1.57 blocks and 2.0 aces per match for the Bruins, who were 25–7 and reached the CIF Southern Section Division I-AA semifinal. She finished her high school career with 2,145 career kills, 349 blocks and 152 aces. She was named 2004 High School Player of the Year by Volleyball Magazine.

== Career at Stanford ==
=== 2005 Freshman season ===
Led the Pac-10 in kills (297) and kills per game (4.50) up until she tore her ACL near the end of the season and sat out the last 11 matches.

=== 2006 Sophomore season ===
Barboza recovered from her injury and was named an AVCA and Volleyball Magazine first team All-American. She led the team with 463 kills and 4.21 kills per game. She also led the team with 48 services aces (0.44 per game), was third on the team with 329 digs, and fourth with 76 total blocks. She collected double-digit kills in 29 of Stanford's 34 matches.

She helped her team reach the 2006 NCAA title match against Nebraska, but Stanford was defeated, 3–1. Barboza was named to the final four All-Tournament team for her efforts, as she collected 12 kills and 7 digs.

=== 2007 Junior season ===
Barboza repeated as an AVCA and Volleyball Magazine first team All-American. She accumulated 467 kills (3.99 kpg) for the season and led the team with 32 service aces. She was second on the team with 3.25 digs per game, hit .281% on the year and tallied 44 blocks. She led the team with a career-best 20 double-doubles on the year. She recorded double-figure kills in 29 matches, and double-figure digs in 20 of those. She was named the AVCA National Player of the Week on October 8, 2007.

She once again helped her team in the 2007 NCAA title match against Penn State, but Stanford was defeated, 3–2. Barboza had 16 kills and 12 digs in the match, for her 20th double-double of the season.

=== 2008 Senior season ===
Barboza was named an AVCA First Team All-American for the third time in her career. She was second on the team with 412 kills (3.49 kps), finished among the Pac-10 leaders in kills (7th) and points (8th), led the team with 24 service aces and ranked second with 358 digs. She helped Stanford to the NCAA title match for the third consecutive season and was named to the Final Four All-Tournament Team.

She finished ninth all-time at Stanford in kills (1,639), sixth in digs (1,241) and ninth in service aces (115).

== International career ==
In 2003, she was the youngest member on the USA women's national training team that earned a bronze medal at the 2003 Pan American Games in Santo Domingo, Dominican Republic. In 2004, then a rising high school senior, was named one of 6 alternatives for the USA National Team for the 2004 Olympics.

In 2007, she contributed 2.59 points per set during the Pan American Cup, highlighted by four double-figure point contests. She added 2.50 digs per set during the Pan American Games, and recorded 15 points against Argentina with 13 kills and two aces on June 21. She provided four aces as part of 10-point match against Costa Rica on June 22, and averaged 3.06 points during the Pan American Games, including 2.69 kills and 0.25 blocks per set. She turned in three double-figure point matches at Pan American Games, topped by a 12-point performance against Puerto Rico on July 15.

As of February 2008, she is training with the U.S. National Team. In June, she helped team USA to a fifth-place finish at the 2008 Pan American Cup, attacking at a .302 clip and notching 17 points against Venezuela en route to helping team USA to a fifth-place finish.

On June 17, she was named to the 19-player preliminary Olympic roster for the 2008 Olympics and was an Olympic alternate.

For the 2009–2010 Barboza was a member of the Torray Arrows, a team based in Ōtsu, Shiga, Japan. Her long-time mentor Doug Woodburn was not able to make the journey to Japan with her, but she says he continues to give her inspiration with their daily video conferences.

Cynthia was a leader of the national team that won the bronze medal at the 2011 Pan American Games held in Guadalajara, Mexico.

=== Major international competition ===
- 2009
  - Final Four Intercontinental Cup (silver medal)
  - Pan American Cup (fourth place)
  - FIVB World Championship Qualification Tournament – NORCECA Pool G (Gold)
  - FIVB World Grand Prix (Ninth Place)
- 2008
  - Pan American Cup (Fifth Place)
  - U.S. Olympic Team Exhibition for Volleyball Series versus Brazil
  - FIVB World Grand Prix (fourth place)
- 2007
  - Pan American Cup (fourth place)
  - Pan American Games (bronze medal)
- 2003
  - Pan American Games (bronze medal)
- 2002
  - NORCECA Junior Girls Continental Championships (silver medal)
  - NORCECA Youth Girls Continental Championships (gold medal)

== Collegiate Awards & Honors ==
- Three time AVCA first team All-American (2006, 2007, 2008)
- Three time Volleyball Magazine first team All-American (2006, 2007, 2008)
- Three time AVCA All-Pacific region team (2006, 2007, 2008)
- Three time All-Pac 10 team (2006, 2007, 2008)
- 2008 Final Four All-Tournament Team
- 2007 Pac-10 All-Academic Honorable Mention
- 2007 ESPN The Magazine Second Team Academic All-American
- 2007 Pac-10 Player of the Week (Oct. 8)
- 2007 AVCA National Player of the Week (Oct. 8)
- 2006 Final Four All-Tournament Team
- 2006 Pac-10 Player of the Week (Sept. 10)
- 2006 Waikiki Beach Marriott Challenge MVP

== High School Awards & Honors ==
- 2005 Gatorade Female Athlete of the Year
- 2004–05 Gatorade National Player of the Year for volleyball
- 2005 Gatorade California Player of the Year for volleyball
- 2005 Prepvolleyball.com class of 2005 top "Senior Ace" (high school recruit)
- 2004 Volleyball Magazine High School Player of the Year
- Four time first team All-CIF (2001–04)
- Three time Prepvolleyball.com High School All-American (2002–04)
- 2003–04 Gatorade National Player of the Year for volleyball
- 2004 Gatorade California Player of the Year for volleyball
- 2004 Los Angeles Times Girls' volleyball All-Star team
- 2002 Los Angeles Times Player of the Year
- 2002 CIF I-AA MVP
- 2002 Student Sports Magazine National Sophomore of the Year
- 2002 AAU National Beach Volleyball Champion
- 2001 Student Sports Magazine National Freshman of the Year
