= Dayami Sánchez =

Cuban volleyball player

Personal information
- Full name: Dayami Sanchez Savon
- Nationality: Cuban
- Born: 14 March 1994 (age 32)
- Height: 1.93 m (6 ft 4 in)
- Weight: 75 kg (165 lb)
- Spike: 3.15 cm (1 in)
- Block: 3.05 cm (1 in)

Career
Years	Teams
2014	Ciudad Habana.

Dayami Sanchez Savon (born 14 March 1994) is a Cuban female volleyball player. She is a member of the Cuba women's national volleyball team and played for Ciudad Habana.

== Career ==
She was part of the Cuban national team at the 2014 FIVB World Grand Prix, 2014 FIVB Volleyball Women's World Championship, 2015 FIVB Volleyball Women's U23 World Championship, 2015 FIVB World Grand Prix, and the 2016 FIVB World Grand Prix.

== Clubs ==
- 2010-2015 Centrales
- 2015-2017 Ciudad Habana
- 2017-2018 Le Cannet
- 2019-2020 UTE Budapest
- 2019-2020 Gimcheon Korea Expressway Hi-Pass
- 2020-2021 SC Prometey
- 2020-2021 Béziers Volley
