= Volleyball at the 2011 Pan American Games – Women's tournament =

Volleyball – Women's tournament at the 2011 Pan American Games
- Venue: Pan American Volleyball Complex
- Dates: 15–20 October 2011
- Competitors: 96 from 8 nations

Medalists
| Gold medal | Brazil |
| Silver medal | Cuba |
| Bronze medal | United States |

The women's tournament of volleyball at the 2011 Pan American Games in Guadalajara, Mexico began on 15 October and ended on 20 October 2011, when the Brazil defeated Cuba 3–2 for the gold medal. all games were held at the Pan American Volleyball Complex. The defending champions are Cuba.

== Teams ==
=== Qualification ===
The top seven teams in the combined FIVB and 2010 Women's Pan-American Volleyball Cup rankings plus hosts Mexico qualified for the final tournament. The following nations qualified for the tournament:

| Event | Date | Location | Vacancies | Qualified |
|---|---|---|---|---|
| Host Nation | – | – | 1 | Mexico |
| FIVB + 2010 Women's Pan-American Volleyball Cup rankings | January 15, 2011 | – | 7 | Brazil; United States; Cuba; Dominican Republic; Peru; Puerto Rico; Canada |
| TOTAL | | | 8 | |

=== Squads ===
At the start of tournament, all eight participating countries had 12 players on their rosters. Final squads for the tournament are due on September 14, 2011 a month before the start of 2011 Pan American Games.

- Brazil
- Canada
- Cuba
- Dominican Republic
- Mexico
- Peru
- Puerto Rico
- United States

== Format ==
- Eight teams are split into two preliminary round groups of four teams each. The top team from each group qualifies for the semifinals.
- The second placed team will play the third placed team from the other group for another place in the semifinals.
- The winning teams from the semifinals play for the gold medal. The losing teams compete for the bronze medal.

=== Pool standing procedure ===
Match won 3–0: 5 points for the winner, 0 point for the loser
Match won 3–1: 4 points for the winner, 1 points for the loser
Match won 3–2: 3 points for the winner, 2 points for the loser
In case of tie, the teams were classified according to the following criteria:
points ratio and sets ratio

== Preliminary round ==
All times are local Central Daylight Time (UTC-5)

=== Group A ===
| Pos | Team | Pld | W | L | Pts | SPW | SPL | SPR | SW | SL | SR | Qualification |
|---|---|---|---|---|---|---|---|---|---|---|---|---|
| 1 | Brazil | 3 | 3 | 0 | 13 | 267 | 212 | 1.259 | 9 | 2 | 4.500 | Semifinals |
| 2 | Cuba | 3 | 2 | 1 | 10 | 259 | 236 | 1.097 | 7 | 4 | 1.750 | Quarterfinals |
| 3 | Dominican Republic | 3 | 1 | 2 | 5 | 283 | 304 | 0.931 | 5 | 8 | 0.625 | Quarterfinals |
| 4 | Canada | 3 | 0 | 3 | 2 | 209 | 266 | 0.786 | 2 | 9 | 0.222 | |

| Date | | Score | | Set 1 | Set 2 | Set 3 | Set 4 | Set 5 | Total | Report |
|---|---|---|---|---|---|---|---|---|---|---|
| Oct 15 | Cuba | 3–0 | Canada | 25–22 | 25–16 | 25–18 | | | 75–56 | Report |
| Oct 15 | Brazil | 3–1 | Dominican Republic | 25–22 | 21–25 | 25–16 | 25–20 | | 96–83 | Report |
| Oct 16 | Cuba | 3–1 | Dominican Republic | 25–23 | 21–25 | 25–20 | 25–16 | | 96–84 | Report |
| Oct 16 | Brazil | 3–0 | Canada | 25–19 | 25–12 | 25–10 | | | 75–41 | Report |
| Oct 17 | Dominican Republic | 3–2 | Canada | 27–29 | 22–25 | 27–25 | 25–21 | 15–12 | 116–112 | Report |
| Oct 17 | Brazil | 3–1 | Cuba | 25–23 | 21–25 | 25–22 | 25–18 | | 96–88 | Report |

=== Group B ===
| Pos | Team | Pld | W | L | Pts | SPW | SPL | SPR | SW | SL | SR | Qualification |
|---|---|---|---|---|---|---|---|---|---|---|---|---|
| 1 | United States | 3 | 3 | 0 | 15 | 231 | 161 | 1.435 | 9 | 0 | MAX | Semifinals |
| 2 | Puerto Rico | 3 | 2 | 1 | 8 | 245 | 231 | 1.061 | 6 | 5 | 1.200 | Quarterfinals |
| 3 | Peru | 3 | 1 | 2 | 5 | 225 | 262 | 0.859 | 4 | 7 | 0.571 | Quarterfinals |
| 4 | Mexico | 3 | 0 | 3 | 2 | 224 | 271 | 0.827 | 2 | 9 | 0.222 | |

| Date | | Score | | Set 1 | Set 2 | Set 3 | Set 4 | Set 5 | Total | Report |
|---|---|---|---|---|---|---|---|---|---|---|
| Oct 15 | United States | 3–0 | Puerto Rico | 25–17 | 25–18 | 25–14 | | | 75–49 | Report |
| Oct 15 | Mexico | 1–3 | Peru | 25–27 | 25–16 | 19–25 | 19–25 | | 88–93 | Report |
| Oct 16 | United States | 3–0 | Peru | 25–19 | 25–15 | 25–19 | | | 75–53 | Report |
| Oct 16 | Puerto Rico | 3–1 | Mexico | 22–25 | 25–21 | 25–18 | 25–13 | | 97–77 | Report |
| Oct 17 | Peru | 1–3 | Puerto Rico | 26–24 | 21–25 | 21–25 | 11–25 | | 79–99 | Report |
| Oct 17 | United States | 3–0 | Mexico | 25–14 | 25–16 | 31–29 | | | 81–59 | Report |

== Final round ==
=== Championship bracket ===
Quarterfinals
A2 | Cuba | 3
B3 | Peru | 0
B2 | Puerto Rico | 2
A3 | Dominican Republic | 3

Semifinals
B1 | United States | 1
A2 | Cuba | 3
A1 | Brazil | 3
A3 | Dominican Republic | 0

Final
Cuba | 2
Brazil | 3
Third place
United States | 3
Dominican Republic | 1

=== 5th–8th places bracket ===
Classification 5/8
Peru | 3
Canada | 1
Puerto Rico | 3
Mexico | 2

5th Place Match
Peru | 0
Puerto Rico | 3
7th Place Match
Canada | 3
Mexico | 1

=== Quarterfinals ===
| Date | | Score | | Set 1 | Set 2 | Set 3 | Set 4 | Set 5 | Total | Report |
|---|---|---|---|---|---|---|---|---|---|---|
| Oct 18 | Cuba | 3–0 | Peru | 25–18 | 25–19 | 26–24 | | | 76–61 | Report |
| Oct 18 | Puerto Rico | 2–3 | Dominican Republic | 21–25 | 22–25 | 28–26 | 25–22 | 8–15 | 104–113 | Report |

=== Fifth to eighth place classification ===
| Date | | Score | | Set 1 | Set 2 | Set 3 | Set 4 | Set 5 | Total | Report |
|---|---|---|---|---|---|---|---|---|---|---|
| Oct 19 | Peru | 3–1 | Canada | 26–24 | 18–25 | 25–22 | 25–19 | | 94–90 | Report |
| Oct 19 | Puerto Rico | 3–2 | Mexico | 20–25 | 25–14 | 9–25 | 25–10 | 15–9 | 94–83 | Report |

=== Seventh place match ===
| Date | | Score | | Set 1 | Set 2 | Set 3 | Set 4 | Set 5 | Total | Report |
|---|---|---|---|---|---|---|---|---|---|---|
| Oct 20 | Canada | 3–1 | Mexico | 19–25 | 25–17 | 26–24 | 25–15 | | 95–81 | Report |

=== Fifth place match ===
| Date | | Score | | Set 1 | Set 2 | Set 3 | Set 4 | Set 5 | Total | Report |
|---|---|---|---|---|---|---|---|---|---|---|
| Oct 20 | Peru | 0–3 | Puerto Rico | 23–25 | 20–25 | 19–25 | | | 62–75 | Report |

=== Semifinals ===
| Date | | Score | | Set 1 | Set 2 | Set 3 | Set 4 | Set 5 | Total | Report |
|---|---|---|---|---|---|---|---|---|---|---|
| Oct 19 | United States | 1–3 | Cuba | 17–25 | 16–25 | 27–25 | 21–25 | | 81–100 | Report |
| Oct 19 | Brazil | 3–0 | Dominican Republic | 25–19 | 25–18 | 25–23 | | | 75–60 | Report |

=== Bronze medal match ===
| Date | | Score | | Set 1 | Set 2 | Set 3 | Set 4 | Set 5 | Total | Report |
|---|---|---|---|---|---|---|---|---|---|---|
| Oct 20 | United States | 3–1 | Dominican Republic | 23–25 | 25–16 | 25–20 | 25–19 | | 98–80 | Report |

=== Gold medal match ===
| Date | | Score | | Set 1 | Set 2 | Set 3 | Set 4 | Set 5 | Total | Report |
|---|---|---|---|---|---|---|---|---|---|---|
| Oct 20 | Cuba | 2–3 | Brazil | 15–25 | 25–21 | 21–25 | 25–21 | 10–15 | 96–107 | Report |

2011 Pan American Games champion

Brazil
4th title

== Final standing ==
| Rank | Team |
|---|---|
| 1st place, gold medalist(s) | Brazil |
| 2nd place, silver medalist(s) | Cuba |
| 3rd place, bronze medalist(s) | United States |
| 4 | Dominican Republic |
| 5 | Puerto Rico |
| 6 | Peru |
| 7 | Canada |
| 8 | Mexico |

== Awards ==
- MVP: Yoana Palacios (CUB)
- Best scorer: Bethania de la Cruz (DOM)
- Best spiker: Yoana Palacios (CUB)
- Best blocker: Lauren Gibbemeyer (USA)
- Best server: Gyselle Silva (CUB)
- Best digger: Brenda Castillo (DOM)
- Best setter: Dani Lins (BRA)
- Best receiver: Brenda Castillo (DOM)
- Best libero: Brenda Castillo (DOM)

== Medalists ==
| Event | Gold | Silver | Bronze |
|---|---|---|---|
| Women's tournament | Brazil; Fabiana Claudino; Juciely Cristina Barreto; Dani Lins; Paula Pequeno; Thaisa Menezes; Marianne Steinbrecher; Jaqueline Carvalho; Tandara Caxieta; Sheilla Castro; Fabiana de Oliveira; Fernanda Garay; Fabíola de Souza | Cuba; Emily Borrell; Kenia Carcaces; Liannes Castañeda; Ana Yilian Cleger; Rosanna Giel; Daymara Lescay; Yoana Palacios; Alena Rojas; Wilma Salas; Yanelis Santos; Yusidey Silie; Gyselle Silva | United States; Keao Burdine; Angela Forsett; Cynthia Barboza; Alexandra Klineman; Regan Hood; Cassidy Lichtman; Lauren Gibbemeyer; Jessica Jones; Carli Lloyd; Courtney Thompson; Kayla Banwart; Tamari Miyashiro |
