= Lauren Gibbemeyer =

American volleyball player

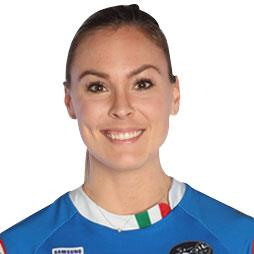
- Gibbemeyer in 2017

Personal information
- Born: September 8, 1988 (age 38); Rhode Island, U.S.
- Hometown: Saint Paul, Minnesota, U.S.
- Height: 6 ft 2 in (1.87 m)

Volleyball information
- Position: Middle Blocker
- Current club: (Turkey) Eczacıbaşı VitrA

Career
Years	Teams
2011–2012	(Japan) TAB Queenseis
2012–2013	(Italy) Volley Pesaro
2013–2014	(Azerbaijan) Lokomotiv Baku
2014–2015	(Italy) Imoco Volley Conegliano
2015–2017	(Italy) Pomí Casalmaggiore
2017–2018	(Italy) AGIL Volley Novara
2018–2020	(Turkey) Eczacıbaşı VitrA
2020–2021	(Sweden) Hylte/Halmstad
2021	(United States) Athletes Unlimited

National team
2011–2018	United States
Medal record
Women's volleyball
Representing United States
FIVB World Cup
Bronze medal – third place	2015 Japan	Team
World Grand Champions Cup
Silver medal – second place	2013 Japan	Team
Bronze medal – third place	2017 Japan	Team
FIVB World Grand Prix
Gold medal – first place	2015 Omaha	Team
FIVB Nations League
Gold medal – first place	2018 Nanjing	Team
Pan American Games
Bronze medal – third place	2011 Guadalajara	Team
Pan-American Cup
Gold medal – first place	2012 Mexico	Team
Gold medal – first place	2013 Peru	Team

Lauren Gibbemeyer (born September 8, 1988) is an American indoor volleyball player. She was a member of the United States women's national volleyball team and plays as middle blocker.

== Career ==
She played college women's volleyball at University of Minnesota from 2007 to 2010.

Gibbemeyer was part of the USA national team that won the 2015 FIVB World Grand Prix gold medal.

Lauren Gibbemeyer's early career started with Northern Lights Volleyball Club. In these years she won the 2006 North American Junior Championship. From 2007 to 2010 she played for the University of Minnesota, taking part in the Austin 2009 semifinals against the University of Texas. In 2011, after college she was asked to play for the national team for the first time. She won the bronze medal at the 16th Pan American Games, where she was awarded Best block.
In the 2011–12 season she began her professional career in the Japanese league with Toyota Auto Body Queens.
The following season she moved to Robursport Volley Pesaro in Italy.
She won the gold medal at the Pan American Cup and the North American Championship with the national team. She also won the silver medal at the Grand Champions Cup.
In the 2013–14 season she played for Lokomotiv Baku, the Azerbaijani Super league. In January 2014, in the second part of the season, she came back to play in the Italian Serie A1* for Imoco Volley Conegliano.
The following season she stayed in Italy, playing for Volleyball Casalmaggiore and winning the league title and the Italian Super Cup in 2015.

She participated in the 2018 FIVB Volleyball Women's Nations League.

=== Achievements ===
National team

- Pan-Am Cup Mexico 2012
- Pan-Am Cup Peru 2013
- FIVB World Grand Prix Omaha 2015
- 2015 FIVB Women's World Cup
- 2013 FIVB Women's World Grand Champions Cup

Clubs

- 2016 FIVB Volleyball Women's Club World Championship, with Pomi Casalmaggiore
