= Daymara Lescay =

Cuban volleyball player (born 1992)

Personal information
- Full name: Daymara Lescay Cajigal
- Nationality: Cuban
- Born: 5 September 1992 (age 34)
- Height: 1.84 m (6 ft 0 in)
- Weight: 72 kg (159 lb)
- Spike: 310 cm (122 in)
- Block: 305 cm (120 in)

Volleyball information
- Position: Middle Blocker

Career
Years	Teams
2014	Guantanamo
Honours
Women's volleyball
Representing Cuba
Pan American Games
Silver medal – second place	2011 Guadalajara	Team

Daymara Lescay (born 5 September 1992) is a Cuban female volleyball player. She is a member of the Cuba women's national volleyball team and played for Guantanamo in 2014.

She was part of the Cuban national team at the 2010 FIVB Volleyball Women's World Championship, and the 2014 FIVB Volleyball Women's World Championship in Italy.

== Clubs ==
- (Cuba) Guantanamo (2014)
