= Paula Pequeno =

Brazilian volleyball player (born 1982)

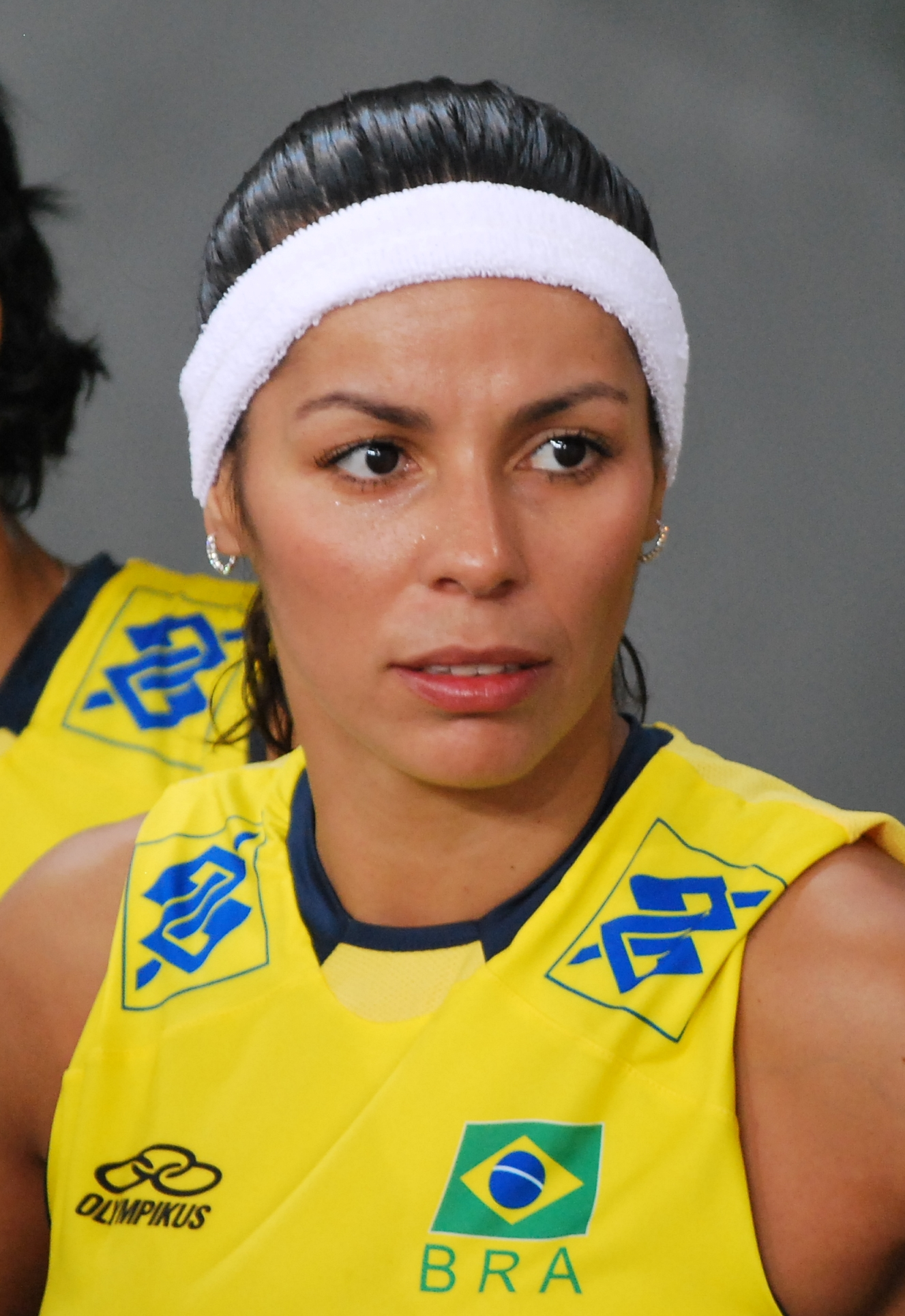

Personal information
- Full name: Paula Renata Marques Pequeno
- Born: 22 January 1982 (age 44); Brasília, DF, Brazil
- Height: 1.84 m (6 ft 1/2 in)
- Weight: 74 kg (163 lb)
- Spike: 302 cm (119 in)
- Block: 285 cm (112 in)

Volleyball information
- Position: Outside hitter
- Current club: Retired
- Number: 4

National team
2002–2012	Brazil
Honours
Women's volleyball
Representing Brazil
Olympic Games
Gold medal – first place	2008 Beijing	Team
Gold medal – first place	2012 London	Team
World Championship
Silver medal – second place	2006 Japan	Team
World Cup
Silver medal – second place	2003 Japan	Team
Silver medal – second place	2007 Japan	Team
World Grand Champions Cup
Silver medal – second place	2009 Tokyo/Fukuoka	Team
World Grand Prix
Gold medal – first place	2005 Sendai	Team
Gold medal – first place	2008 Yokohama	Team
Silver medal – second place	2010 Ningbo	Team
Silver medal – second place	2012 Ningbo	Team
Pan American Games
Gold medal – first place	2011 Guadalajara	Team
Silver medal – second place	2007 Rio de Janeiro	Team
Final Four Cup
Gold medal – first place	2008 Fortaleza	Team
Pan-American Cup
Gold medal – first place	2011 Ciudad Juárez	Team
South American Championship
Gold medal – first place	2007 Rancagua/Santiago	Team
Gold medal – first place	2009 Porto Alegre	Team
- Last updated: March 2015

Paula Renata Marques Pequeno (Brasília, January 22, 1982) is a Brazilian two-time Olympic gold medal winning volleyball player. She plays for Vôlei Bauru.

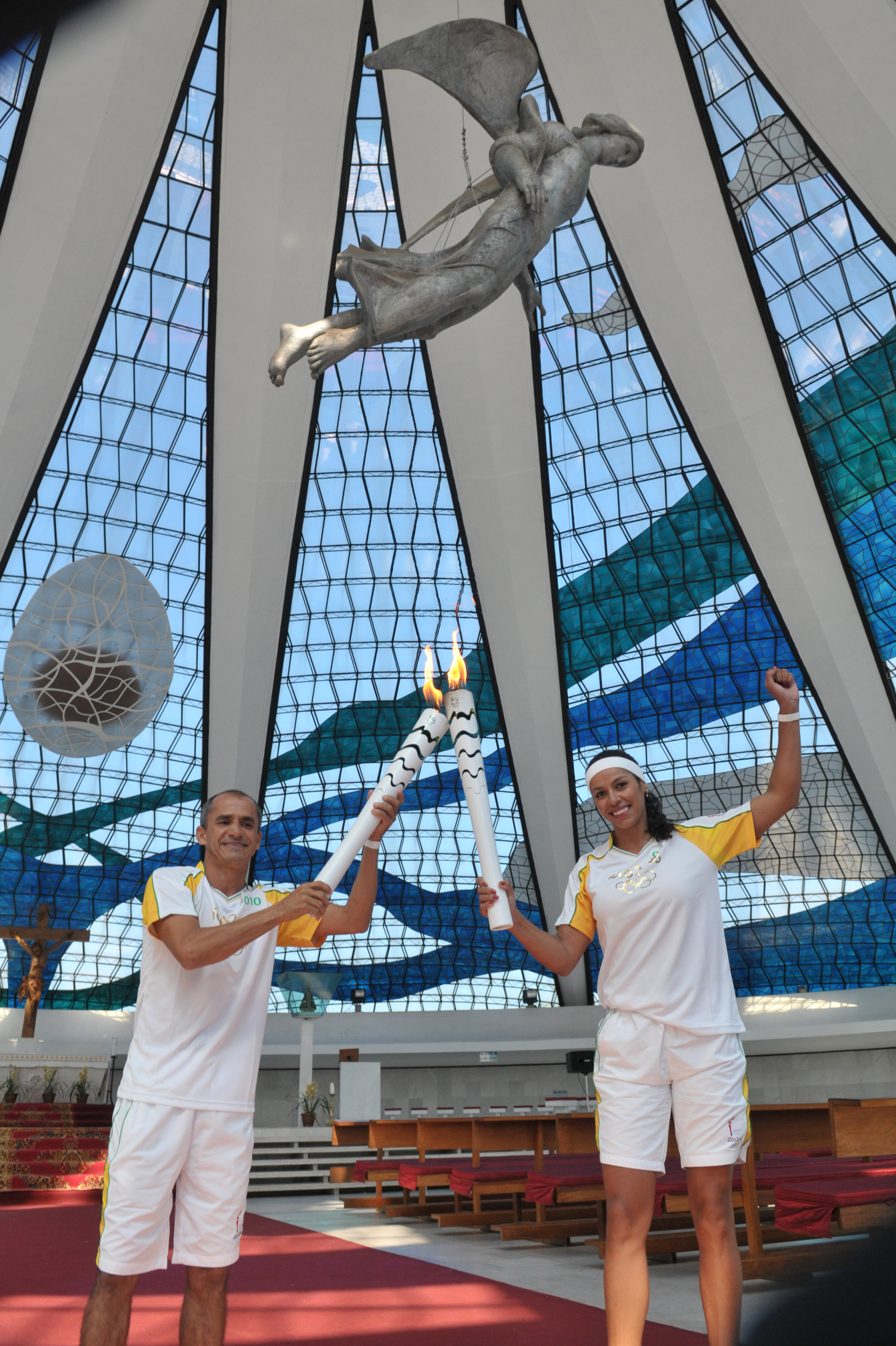
Pequeno with Vanderlei de Lima - 2016 Summer Olympics torch relay

== Career ==
Pequeno was part of the National Team which won the gold medal at the 2011 Pan American Games held in Guadalajara, Mexico.

Pequeno played with Fenerbahçe in the 2012 FIVB Club World Championship held in Doha, Qatar and helped her team to win the bronze medal after defeating Puerto Rico's Lancheras de Cataño 3-0.

== Clubs ==
- (Brazil) ASBAC (1994–1997)
- (Brazil) Leites Nestlé (1997–1998)
- (Brazil) Dayvit (1998–1999)
- (Brazil) Finasa Osasco (1999–2009)
- (Russia) Zarechie Odintsovo (2009–2010)
- (Brazil) Vôlei Futuro (2010–2012)
- (Turkey) Fenerbahçe Istanbul (2012–2013)
- (Brazil) Brasília Vôlei (2013–2017)
- (Brazil) Vôlei Bauru (2017–2018)
- (Brazil) Osasco/Audax (2018–2019)

== Awards ==
=== Individuals ===
- 2000 U20 South American Championship – "Best Spiker"
- 2005 FIVB World Grand Prix – "Most Valuable Player"
- 2007 South American Championship – "Most Valuable Player"
- 2007–08 Brazilian Superliga – "Best Spiker"
- 2008 Summer Olympics – "Most Valuable Player"

=== Clubs ===
- 2001–02 Brazilian Superliga – Runner-up, with Finasa Osasco
- 2002–03 Brazilian Superliga – Champion, with Finasa Osasco
- 2003–04 Brazilian Superliga – Champion, with Finasa Osasco
- 2004–05 Brazilian Superliga – Champion, with Finasa Osasco
- 2005–06 Brazilian Superliga – Runner-up, with Finasa Osasco
- 2006–07 Brazilian Superliga – Runner-up, with Finasa Osasco
- 2007–08 Brazilian Superliga – Runner-up, with Finasa Osasco
- 2008–09 Brazilian Superliga – Runner-up, with Finasa Osasco
- 2009–10 Russian Super League – Champion, with Zarechye Odintsovo
- 2012–13 CEV Cup – Runner-up, with Fenerbahçe
- 2012 FIVB Club World Championship – Bronze medal, with Fenerbahçe

Awards
Preceded by (United States) Logan Tom	Most Valuable Player of FIVB World Grand Prix; 2005	Succeeded by (Brazil) Sheilla Castro
Preceded by (China) Feng Kun	Most Valuable Player of Olympic Games; 2008	Succeeded by (South Korea) Kim Yeon-Koung
