= Aylin Pereyra =

Argentine volleyball player (born 1988)

Personal information
- Nationality: Argentine
- Born: 2 July 1988 (age 38)
- Height: 180 cm (71 in)
- Weight: 68 kg (150 lb)
- Spike: 300 cm (118 in)
- Block: 292 cm (115 in)

Volleyball information
- Number: 4 (national team)

Career
Years	Teams
2012	Boca Juniors

National team
2012	Argentina

Aylin Pereyra (born 2 July 1988) is an Argentine female volleyball player. She was part of the Argentina women's national volleyball team.

She participated in the 2011 FIVB Volleyball World Grand Prix. At club level she played for Boca Juniors in 2011.
