= Yoana Palacio =

Cuban-born Azerbaijani volleyball player

Yoana Palacio Mahmudova
Personal information
- Full name: Yoana Palacio Mendoza Mahmudova
- Nationality: Cuban / Azerbaijani
- Born: 6 October 1990 (age 36) Havana, Cuba
- Height: 185 cm (6 ft 1 in)
- Weight: 67 kg (148 lb)
- Spike: 327 cm (129 in)
- Block: 321 cm (126 in)

Volleyball information
- Position: Opposite / Wing Spiker

Career
- Years: Team
- 2008–2013 2013–2015 2016 2016–2017 2017–2019 2019–2021 2021–2022 2022–2023: (Cuba) Capitalinas (Azerbaijan) Rabita Baku (Turkey) Beşiktaş (China) Yunnan University Dianchi College (Brazil) Associação Vôlei Bauru (Kazakhstan) VC Zhetysu (Turkey) İlbank (Greece) Panathinaikos

National team
- Years: Team
- 2009–2013: Cuba
Honours
Women's volleyball
Representing Cuba
Pan American Games
| Silver medal – second place | 2011 Guadalajara | Team |
NORCECA Championship
| Bronze medal – third place | 2009 Bayamón | Team |
| Bronze medal – third place | 2011 Caguas | Team |
- Updated on November 2017

Yoana Palacio Mahmudova (born 6 October 1990) is a Cuban-born Azerbaijani female volleyball player. She was part of the Cuba women's national volleyball team at the 2010 FIVB World Championship in Japan. She won the silver medal in the 2011 Pan American Games being selected Best Spiker and Most Valuable Player and twice won the bronze medal in the NORCECA Continental Championship, in 2009 and 2011.

She won three time the Cuban National League with the team from Ciudad Havana, Capitalinas from 2009 to 2011 and the Azerbaijani League with Rabita Baku in the 2014/15 season.

== Career ==
=== 2008–2009 ===
Palacio won the bronze medal in the 2008 Cuban National Games when her team, Centrales, won 3–0 to Venezuela. She led the Cuban Junior national team to the 2008 NORCECA Continental Championship bronze medal. Palacio won the 2009 Cuban National League championship playing with the club Capitalinas, winning the final series 3–0 to Serranas. Before the Continental Championship, her national team won the friendly tournament President of the Republic, that they won over the local team, Peru. Later she won the 2009 NORCECA Championship bronze medal when her team defeated 3–2 to the United States.

=== 2010 ===
With Capitalinas, Palacio won undefeated the 2010 Cuban National League championship She traveled to Peru with her national team to have altitude training and warm up matches with the Peru women's national volleyball team as preparations for the 2010 World Championships. Back in Cuba, Palacio won the 2010 Cuban National Games gold medal, this time playing with Occidentales. After playing warm up tournaments in China, she participated in the 2010 Montreux Volley Masters, winning with her national team the bronze medal. Palacio played the 2010 FIVB World Championship in Japan. She ranked 12th with her team.

=== 2011 ===
She claimed with Capitalinas the 2011 Cuban National League Championship undefeated, playing sometimes as libero and as a spiker. In the 2011 Montreux Volley Masters she won the silver medal with her national team when they were beaten by the Japanese team 0–3.

She won the Most Valuable Player and Best Spiker awards in the 2011 Pan American Games were her national team won the silver medal. In the 2011 NORCECA Championship she won with her national team the bronze medal. She was awarded by the Circle of Sports Chroniclers and the Cuban Sports Institute as the 2011 Best Cuban Athlete along with Julio César La Cruz, Yarelys Barrios and Wilfredo León.

=== 2012 ===
Palacio was chosen as the Most Valuable Player and Best Spiker in the 2012 Copa Latina held in Lima, Peru were her team won the gold medal. She then travelled to Tijuana, Mexico to play the 2012 Summer Olympics NORCECA qualification tournament, there her team lost the qualification to the Dominican Republic falling 1–3 in the final match. She was selected Best Spiker from this tournament. In the 2012 FIVB World Grand Prix, Palacio ranked sixth with her national team winning the Best Spiker individual award. Cuba had another chance to qualify for the 2012 Summer Olympics in the World Qualifier, but there Cuba won just two matches and failed to qualify to the Olympics in volleyball for the first time since the 1972 Summer Olympics. She then lead the Cuban U23 national team to a fifth place rank in the 2012 U23 Pan-American Cup. Palacio and fellow Cuban teammate Yanelis Santos were announced to have signed with the Chinese club Henan Xinyuan for the 2012/13 season but the league started and the pair never make it to China.

=== 2013 ===
She helped her national team to rank sixth in the 2013 Pan-American Cup after falling 2–3 to Puerto Rico. She departed to the 2013 FIVB World Grand Prix as one of her team main players, that had previously suffered two abandons, Cleger and Marsillan and ended up in the 19th place out of 20 teams. Just before the start of the 2013 NORCECA Championship, the Cuban Federation declared that Palacio will not travel with the national team to Omaha, Nebraska, United States. The Federation cited disagreements with the player and the Cuban national team had to play the continental championship with only 11 players.

=== 2014 ===
She was announced to be signed with the Azerbaijani club Rabita Baku along with fellow Cuban Rosanna Giel in January 2014 and later with other Cubans Wilma Salas and Gyselle Silva, attached with five years contracts, with Giel later assigned to Rabita's affiliate club Telekom Baku. She played the 2014–15 CEV Champions League were her club lost in the pool play round, facing financial difficulties.

=== 2015 ===
Rabita then played the CEV Cup, winning the bronze medal and also winning the Azerbaijani League Championship. While visiting her Peruvian friend Carla Rueda in Lima, she was hit and dragged by a Taxi in the district of Surquillo suffering minor injuries in one leg. She was close to sign with Vôlei Bauru for the 2015/16 season, but she suffered a ligament injury of the left knee.

=== 2016 ===
Palacio was considered for signing with the Italian club Bolzano, but she stayed and trained in Bauru and was expected to play with that club while she was recovering from surgery, but received a better offer for the 2016/17 season from the Turkish club Beşiktaş in mid 2016. But in October, after having played warm up matches, she agreed with the Turkish club and parted ways, with Palacio joining the Chinese Yunnan University Dianchi Institute with compatriot Gyselle Silva in the round six, replacing Puerto Rican Karina Ocasio of the ongoing Chinese Volleyball League.

=== 2017 ===
After saving her Chinese club from the relegation by winning the elimination 2017 playoffs undefeated, she joined the Brazilian club Vôlei Bauru for the 2017 Paulista Championship, finishing with 108 points as the second best scorer of the tournament, the club later offered her the full Brazilian League 2017/18 season contract.

== Personal life ==
She was born Yoana Palacio Mendoza in Havana, Cuba. Palacio married in Azerbaijan in 2014 and obtained that nation's documents and the name Mahmudova. She is 185 cm (6 ft 1 in) tall 67 kilograms (148 lb).

== Clubs ==
- (Cuba) Capitalinas (2008–2013)
- (Azerbaijan) Rabita Baku (2013–2015)
- (Turkey) Beşiktaş (2016)
- (China) Yunnan University Dianchi College (2016–2017)
- (Brazil) Associação Vôlei Bauru (2017–2019)
- (Kazakhstan) VC Zhetysu (2019–2021)
- (Turkey) İlbank (2021–2022)
- (Greece) Panathinaikos (2022–2023)

== Awards ==
=== Individuals ===
- 2011 Pan American Games "Most Valuable Player"
- 2011 Pan American Games "Best Spiker"
- 2012 Copa Latina "Most Valuable Player"
- 2012 Copa Latina "Best Spiker"
- 2012 World Grand Prix "Best Blocker"

=== Clubs ===
- 2009 Cuban National League – Champion, with Capitalinas
- 2010 Cuban National League – Champion, with Capitalinas
- 2011 Cuban National League – Champion, with Capitalinas
- 2014–15 CEV Cup – Bronze medal, with Rabita Baku
- 2014–15 Azerbaijan Super League – Champion, with Rabita Baku
- 2022–23 Greek Volleyball League Champion, with Panathinaikos
