= Natalya Kulinich =

Kazakhstani volleyball player (born 1988)

Personal information
- Full name: Natalya Kulinich Tarassevitch
- Nationality: Kazakhstani
- Born: 19 July 1988 (age 38)
- Hometown: Temirtau, Karaganda, Kazakhstan
- Height: 1.73 m (5 ft 8 in)
- Weight: 66 kg (146 lb)
- Spike: 280 cm (110 in)
- Block: 275 cm (108 in)

Volleyball information
- Number: 19

Career
Years	Teams
2011	(Kazakhstan) Irtysh Kazchrome

Natalya Kulinich Tarassevitch (born 19 July 1988) is a Kazakhstani volleyball player. She is a member of the Kazakhstan women's national volleyball team and played for Irtysh Kazchrome in 2011.

She was part of the Kazakhstani national team at the 2011 FIVB World Grand Prix.

== Clubs ==
- (Kazakhstan) Irtysh Kazchrome (2011)
