= Emily Borrell =

Cuban volleyball player

Personal information
- Full name: Emily Borrell Cruz
- Nationality: Cuban
- Born: 19 February 1992 (age 34)
- Height: 1.67 m (5 ft 6 in)
- Weight: 55 kg (121 lb)
- Spike: 270 cm (106 in)
- Block: 260 cm (102 in)

Volleyball information
- Position: Libero

Career
Years	Teams
2010–2014	Villa Clara

National team
2010–2014	Cuba
Honours
Women's volleyball
Representing Cuba
Pan American Games
Silver medal – second place	2011 Guadalajara	Team

Emily Borrell Cruz (born 19 February 1992) is a Cuban female volleyball player. She is a member of the Cuba women's national volleyball team and played for Villa Clara in 2014.

She was part of the Cuban national team at the 2010 FIVB Volleyball Women's World Championship, and the 2014 FIVB Volleyball Women's World Championship in Italy.

== Clubs ==
- (Cuba) Villa Clara (2010–2014)
