= Yusidey Silié =

Cuban volleyball player (born 1984)

Personal information
- Full name: Yusidey Silié Frómeta
- Nationality: Cuban
- Born: 11 November 1984 (age 41) Havana
- Home town: Havana
- Height: 1.83 m (6 ft 0 in)
- Weight: 80 kg (176 lb)
- Spike: 316 cm (124 in)
- Block: 307 cm (121 in)

Volleyball information
- Position: Setter / Opposite
- Current club: Ciudad de La Habana
- Number: 15

National team
- Years: Team
- 2006–: Cuba
Honours
Women's volleyball
Representing Cuba
FIVB World Grand Prix
Silver medal – second place	2008 Yokohama	Team
Pan American Games
Gold medal – first place	2007 Rio de Janeiro	Team
Silver medal – second place	2011 Guadalajara	Team
Pan-American Cup
Gold medal – first place	2007 Colima	Team
NORCECA Championship
Gold medal – first place	2007 Winnipeg	Team
Bronze medal – third place	2009 Bayamon	Team
Bronze medal – third place	2011 Caguas	Team
- Updated on October 2011

Yusidey Silié Frómeta (born 11 November 1984, in Havana) is a Cuban volleyball player who competed in the 2008 Summer Olympics finishing fourth with the Cuban team in the Olympic tournament.

== Career ==
Silié has been playing with the Cuban club Ciudad de La Habana since 2005. In the 2006 season, she won the Best Spiker and Best Blocker while her team won the League Championship.

For the 2010 season she became with her team league champion (Liga Nacional), and individually awarded "Best Setter" and "Most Valuable Player".

She won the "Best Setter" award for the 2011 season of the Cuban Liga Nacional, playing with the crowned champions Ciudad Habana from the Cuban capital city.

Yusidey won with his national team the silver medal at the 2011 Pan American Games held in Guadalajara, Mexico.

== Clubs ==
- (Cuba) Ciudad de La Habana (2005–2011)

== Awards ==
=== Individual ===
- 2006 Cuban Liga Nacional "Best Spiker"
- 2006 Cuban Liga Nacional "Best Blocker"
- 2010 Cuban Liga Nacional "Most Valuable Player"
- 2010 Cuban Liga Nacional "Best Setter"
- 2011 Cuban Liga Nacional "Best Setter"

=== Club ===
- 2005 Cuban Liga Nacional - Champion, with Ciudad de La Habana
- 2006 Cuban Liga Nacional - Champion, with Ciudad de La Habana
- 2010 Cuban Liga Nacional - Champion, with Ciudad de La Habana
- 2011 Cuban Liga Nacional - Champion, with Ciudad de La Habana

=== National team ===
==== Senior team ====
- 2007 Montreux Volley Masters - Silver medal
- 2007 Pan American Games - Gold medal
- 2007 NORCECA Championship - Gold medal
- 2008 FIVB World Grand Prix - Silver medal
- 2008 Montreux Volley Masters - Gold medal
- 2010 Montreux Volley Masters - Bronze medal
- 2011 Pan American Games - Silver medal
