= Rosanna Giel =

Cuban volleyball player (born 1992)

Personal information
- Full name: Rosanna Giel Ramos
- Nationality: Cuban
- Born: 10 June 1992 (age 34)
- Height: 1.87 m (6 ft 2 in)
- Weight: 62 kg (137 lb)
- Spike: 320 cm (126 in)
- Block: 315 cm (124 in)

Volleyball information
- Position: Middle blocker

Career
Years	Teams
2010	Ciego de Ávila (2016–2018) Le Cannet volleyball (Francia)

National team
2010	Cuba
Honours
Women's volleyball
Representing Cuba
Pan American Games
Silver medal – second place	2011 Guadalajara	Team

Rosanna Giel Ramos (born 10 June 1992) is a retired Cuban female volleyball player. She was part of the Cuba women's national volleyball team.

She participated at the 2010 FIVB Volleyball Women's World Championship in Japan. She played with Ciego de Ávila.

== Clubs ==
- (Cuba) Ciego de Ávila (2010)

Le Cannet volleyball, Francia (2016–2017) and (2017–2018)
