= Brazilian Women's Volleyball Superliga 2020–21 =

Superliga Serie A
- Association: CBV
- League: Brazilian Women's Volleyball Superliga
- Sport: Volleyball
- Duration: November 9, 2020 to April 5, 2021
- Games: 148
- Teams: 12
- Season MVP: (Brazil) Thaísa
- Relegated: (Paraná (state)) São José dos Pinhais (São Paulo (state)) São Caetano
- Finals champions: (Minas Gerais) Itambé Minas
- Runners-up: (Minas Gerais) Praia Clube

Seasons
- ← 2019–20 2021–22 →

The Brazilian Women's Volleyball Superliga 2020–21 - Serie A was the 26th edition of this competition organized by the Brazilian Volleyball Confederation through the National Competitions Unit. It would also be the 42nd edition of the Brazilian Women's Volleyball Championship, the main competition between women's volleyball clubs in Brazil.

== Regulation ==
The qualifying phase of the competition is disputed by twelve teams in two rounds. In each turn, all teams will play each other only once. The games in the second round will be played in the same order as the first, only with the court control reversed.

The top eight clubs qualify for the play-offs. At this stage, a 3-0 or 3–1 victory guarantees three points for the winner and no points for the loser. With a score of 3–2, the winner of the match adds two points and the loser one. The last two placed will be relegated to the Series B 2020.

In the following order the tiebreaker criteria will be: number of wins, sets average, points average; direct confrontation (in the case of a tie between two teams) and last draw. The play-offs will be divided into three phases - quarter-finals, semi-finals and final.

In the quarter-finals there will be a cross between the teams with the best technical indexes following the logic: 1st x 8th (A); 2nd x 7th(B); 3rd x 6th (C) and 4th x 5th (D). These will play best of 3 matches (games), with a field command for each and the tiebreaker, if necessary, in the gym of the team with the best technical index of the qualifying phase.

The semi-finals will be disputed by the teams that passed the quarter-finals, following the logic: winner of duel A vs. winner of duel D; winner of duel B x winner of duel C. These will again play best of 3 (games), with a field command for each and the tiebreaker, if necessary, in the gym of the team with the best technical index of the qualifying phase .

The winners qualify for the final, which will be best of 3 games in the first place status of the qualifying round. The third and fourth places were defined by the best technical index of the qualifying phase.

The tournament sets were played up to 25 points with a minimum difference of two points (with the exception of the fifth set, which was won by the team that scored 15 points with at least two points difference). There were technical stops on the 8th and 16th points of the team that reached them first.

== Participating teams ==
Twelve teams dispute the title of the Women's Superliga 2020/2021-Series A. They are:

Team	City	Pos. season 2019/20	Gym	Capacity	Titles	Brazilian Women's Volleyball Superliga 2020–21 (Brazil)
SESC/Flamengo Rio ^{[FLA]}	(Rio de Janeiro (state)) Rio de Janeiro	2º/10º (Superliga A)	Hélio Maurício Gym	1,000	12	Brazilian Women's Volleyball Superliga 2020–21 (Brazil)
Curitiba Volleyball	(Paraná (state)) Curitiba	8th (Superliga A)	Gymnasium of Colégio Positivo	1800	0	Brazilian Women's Volleyball Superliga 2020–21 (Brazil)
Osasco	(São Paulo (state)) Osasco	3rd (Superliga A)	José Liberatti	4,500	5	Brazilian Women's Volleyball Superliga 2020–21 (Brazil)
Praia Clube	(Minas Gerais) Uberlândia	2nd (Superliga A)	Beach Arena	3,000	1	Brazilian Women's Volleyball Superliga 2020–21 (Brazil)
Pinheiros	(São Paulo (state)) São Paulo	9th (Superliga A)	Henrique Villaboim	1,100	0	Brazilian Women's Volleyball Superliga 2020–21 (Brazil)
São Caetano^{[SCA]}	(São Paulo (state)) São Caetano do Sul	12th (Superliga A)	Lauro Gomes	5,000	1	Brazilian Women's Volleyball Superliga 2020–21 (Brazil)
São José dos Pinhais ^{[HER]}	(Paraná (state)) São José dos Pinhais	4th (Superliga B)	Ney Braga Gym	1 100	1	Brazilian Women's Volleyball Superliga 2020–21 (Brazil)
Fluminense	(Rio de Janeiro (state)) Rio de Janeiro	7th (Superliga A)	Hebrew Gym	1,000	2	Brazilian Women's Volleyball Superliga 2020–21 (Brazil)
Itambé Minas	(Minas Gerais) Belo Horizonte	1st (Superliga A)	Arena Minas	3,650	3	Brazilian Women's Volleyball Superliga 2020–21 (Brazil)
Brasília Vôlei	(Federal District (Brazil)) Brasília	1st (Superliga B)	Sesi Taguatinga	1,000	0	Brazilian Women's Volleyball Superliga 2020–21 (Brazil)
SESI Volei Bauru	(São Paulo (state)) Bauru	4th (Superliga A)	Pressure Cooker	2,000	0	Brazilian Women's Volleyball Superliga 2020–21 (Brazil)
São Paulo/Barueri^{[SPFC]}	(São Paulo (state)) Barueri	6th (Superliga A)	José Corrêa	5,000	0	Brazilian Women's Volleyball Superliga 2020–21 (Brazil)

Grades
^{[SPFC]} The São Paulo FC team will partner with Barueri.
^{[HER]} Pinhais, 4th place inherited the vacancies of Itajaí and ADC Bradesco, respectively 2nd and 3rd place in the Brazilian Women's Volleyball Superliga 2020 - Series B and due to the withdrawal of Valinhos.
^{[FLA]} The FLA and SESC who finished last season 2nd and 10th respectively merged.
^{[SCA]} São Caetano was relegated, but due to the withdrawal of Itajaí, ADC Bradesco and Valinhos it remained in the elite.

== Qualifying stage ==
=== Rating ===
- Win by 3 sets to 0 or 3 to 1: 3 points for the winner;
- Win by 3 sets to 2: 2 points for the winner and 1 point for the loser.
- No show, the team loses 2 points.
- In case of equality on points, the following criteria serve as a tiebreaker: number of victories, set ratio and rally ratio.

(Q) - Teams qualified to the quarter-finals.
Teams eliminated and kept for the Series A 2021–22.
(R) - Teams relegated to the Series B 2022.

=== Shift ===
- Location: The teams on the left side of the table play at home.

==== 1st Round ====
Date	Time		Score		Set 1	Set 2	Set 3	Set 4	Set 5	Total	Report
11/09/2020	19:00	Curitiba Vôlei (Paraná (state))	1–3	(São Paulo (state)) Osasco	19–25	25–17	22–25	13–25		79–92	Report
09/11/2020	21:30	Pinheiros (São Paulo (state))	0–3	(São Paulo (state)) Sesi/Vôlei Bauru	18–25	17–25	28–30			63–80	Report
11/10/2020	17:00	Fluminense (Rio de Janeiro (state))	0–3	(São Paulo (state)) São Paulo/Barueri	13–25	19–25	23–25			55–75	Report
11/10/2020	19:00	São Caetano (São Paulo (state))	0–3	(Minas Gerais) Itambé Minas	20–25	15–25	13–25			48–75	Report
11/10/2020	20:00	São José dos Pinhais (Paraná (state))	0–3	(Minas Gerais) Praia Clube	13–25	16–25	16–25			45–75	Report
11/10/2020	21:30	SESC/Flamengo Rio (Rio de Janeiro (state))	3–1	(Federal District (Brazil)) Brasília Vôlei	15–25	25–21	25–19	25–10		90–75	Report

==== 2nd Round ====
Date	Time		Score		Set 1	Set 2	Set 3	Set 4	Set 5	Total	Report
11/13/2020	17:00	São José dos Pinhais (Paraná (state))	1–3	(São Paulo (state)) São Paulo/Barueri	14–25	27–25	21–25	16–25		78–100	Report
11/13/2020	19:00	Itambé Minas (Minas Gerais)	3–1	(São Paulo (state)) Pinheiros	25–19	21–25	25–18	25–17		96–79	Report
11/13/2020	19:00	Praia Clube (Minas Gerais)	3–0	(Federal District (Brazil)) Brasília Vôlei	25–20	25–15	25–21			75–56	Report
11/13/2020	21:30	Osasco (São Paulo (state))	3–0	(Rio de Janeiro (state)) Fluminense	25–17	25–18	25–21			75–56	Report
14/11/2020	17:00	Sesi/Vôlei Bauru (São Paulo (state))	3–1	(Paraná (state)) Curitiba Vôlei	18–25	27–25	25–20	25–23		95–93	Report
14/11/2020	21:30	SESC/Flamengo Rio (Rio de Janeiro (state))	3–0	(São Paulo (state)) São Caetano	25–14	25–13	25–08			75–35	Report

==== 3rd Round ====
Date	Time		Score		Set 1	Set 2	Set 3	Set 4	Set 5	Total	Report
11/16/2020	21:30	Fluminense (Rio de Janeiro (state))	1–3	(São Paulo (state)) Sesi/Bauru Volleyball	16–25	25–17	21–25	16–25		78–92	Report
11/17/2020	16:30	Curitiba Vôlei (Paraná (state))	1–3	(Minas Gerais) Itambé Minas	25–22	15–25	14–25	21–25		75–97	Report
11/17/2020	19:00	São Caetano (São Paulo (state))	0-3	(Minas Gerais) Praia Clube	09–25	10–25	10–25			29–75	Report
11/17/2020	19:00	São Paulo/Barueri (São Paulo (state))	0-3	(São Paulo (state)) Osasco	22–25	20–25	21–25			63–75	Report
11/17/2020	20:00	Brasília Vôlei (Federal District (Brazil))	1–3	(Paraná (state)) São José dos Pinhais	25–17	20–25	24–26	17–25		86–93	Report
11/17/2020	21:30	Pinheiros (São Paulo (state))	0–3	(Rio de Janeiro (state)) SESC/Flamengo Rio	10–25	14–25	25–27			49–77	Report

==== 4th Round ====
Date	Time		Score		Set 1	Set 2	Set 3	Set 4	Set 5	Total	Report
20/11/2020	17:00	São José dos Pinhais (Paraná (state))	0–3	(São Paulo (state)) Osasco	21–25	15–25	22–25			58–75	Report
20/11/2020	19:00	São Paulo/Barueri (São Paulo (state))	2–3	(São Paulo (state)) Sesi/Bauru Volleyball	25–23	20–25	25–19	20–25	11–15	101–107	Report
11/20/2020	19:30	Praia Clube (Minas Gerais)	3–0	(São Paulo (state)) Pinheiros	25–22	25–18	25–15			75–55	Report
11/20/2020	21:30	Itambé Minas (Minas Gerais)	3–0	(Rio de Janeiro (state)) Fluminense	25–14	25–14	25–23			75–51	Report
15/12/2020	20:00	Brasília Vôlei (Federal District (Brazil))	3–1	(São Paulo (state)) São Caetano	20–25	25–17	25–23	25–17		95–82	Report
12/15/2020	19:00	Curitiba Vôlei (Paraná (state))	2–3	(Rio de Janeiro (state)) SESC/Flamengo Rio	25–17	16–25	25–22	21–25	06–15	93–104	Report

==== 5th Round ====
Date	Time		Score		Set 1	Set 2	Set 3	Set 4	Set 5	Total	Report
11/23/2020	21:30	São Paulo/Barueri (São Paulo (state))	0–3	(Minas Gerais) Itambé Minas	15–25	20–25	23–25			58–75	Report
11/24/2020	21:30	Curitiba Vôlei (Paraná (state))	0-3	(Minas Gerais) Praia Clube	19–25	21–25	15–25			55–75	Report
24/11/2020	19:00	Osasco (São Paulo (state))	3–1	(São Paulo (state)) Sesi/Bauru Volleyball	25–20	25–18	23–25	25–11		98–74	Report
11/24/2020	19:00	São Caetano (São Paulo (state))	0-3	(Paraná (state)) São José dos Pinhais	22–25	20–25	25–27			67–77	Report
09/12/2020	20:00	Pinheiros (São Paulo (state))	3–1	(Federal District (Brazil)) Brasília Vôlei	19–25	25–20	25–19	25–18		94–82	Report
08/01/2021	19:00	SESC/Flamengo Rio (Rio de Janeiro (state))	3–0	(Rio de Janeiro (state)) Fluminense	25–11	25–15	25–16			75–42	Report

==== 6th Round ====
Date	Time		Score		Set 1	Set 2	Set 3	Set 4	Set 5	Total	Report
27/11/2020	20:00	São José dos Pinhais (Paraná (state))	0–3	(São Paulo (state)) Sesi/Bauru Volleyball	27–29	17–25	16–25			60–79	Report
11/27/2020	20:00	São Caetano (São Paulo (state))	0–3	(São Paulo (state)) Pine	14–25	23–25	18–25			55–75	Report
11/27/2020	21:30	Itambé Minas (Minas Gerais)	0–3	(São Paulo (state)) Osasco	15–25	16–25	20–25			51–75	Report
11/28/2020	19:00	Praia Clube (Minas Gerais)	3–0	(Rio de Janeiro (state)) Fluminense	25–16	25–15	25–16			75–47	Report
08/12/2020	21:30	SESC/Flamengo Rio (Rio de Janeiro (state))	3–0	(São Paulo (state)) São Paulo/Barueri	25–14	26–24	25–17			76–55	Report
12/29/2020	19:30	Curitiba Vôlei (Paraná (state))	3–0	(Federal District (Brazil)) Brasília Vôlei	25–21	25–17	25–19			75–57	Report

==== Round 7 ====
Date	Time		Score		Set 1	Set 2	Set 3	Set 4	Set 5	Total	Report
12/01/2020	19:00	Pinheiros (São Paulo (state))	3–0	(Paraná (state)) São José dos Pinhais	25–20	25–22	25–12			75–54	Report
12/01/2020	19:00	São Paulo/Barueri (São Paulo (state))	1–3	(Minas Gerais) Praia Clube	24–26	25–21	21–25	22–25		92–97	Report
12/01/2020	21:30	Curitiba Vôlei (Paraná (state))	3–0	(São Paulo (state)) São Caetano	25–21	25–07	25–16			75–44	Report
12/01/2020	21:30	Osasco (São Paulo (state))	3–0	(Rio de Janeiro (state)) SESC/Flamengo Rio	25–16	28–26	25–14			78–56	Report
15/12/2020	21:30	Sesi/Vôlei Bauru (São Paulo (state))	1–3	(Minas Gerais) Itambé Minas	25–21	22–25	14–25	23–25		84–96	Report
03/01/2021	19:30	Fluminense (Rio de Janeiro (state))	1–3	(Federal District (Brazil)) Brasília Vôlei	23–25	11–25	25–20	23–25		82–95	Report

==== 8th Round ====
Date	Time		Score		Set 1	Set 2	Set 3	Set 4	Set 5	Total	Report
04/12/2020	17:00	Brasília Vôlei (Federal District (Brazil))	1–3	(São Paulo (state)) São Paulo/Barueri	25–23	21–25	13–25	18–25		77–98	Report
12/05/2020	17:00	São Caetano (São Paulo (state))	1–3	(Rio de Janeiro (state)) Fluminense	18–25	23–25	25–23	17–25		83–98	Report
12/05/2020	19:00	São José dos Pinhais (Paraná (state))	0–3	(Minas Gerais) Itambé Minas	23–25	20–25	20–25			63–75	Report
05/12/2020	21:30	Pinheiros (São Paulo (state))	1–3	(Paraná (state)) Curitiba Volleyball	21–25	18–25	25–23	25–27		89–100	Report
12/16/2020	19:00	Praia Clube (Minas Gerais)	2–3	(São Paulo (state)) Osasco	21–25	28–26	21–25	25–16	15–17	110–109	Report
04/01/2021	19:00	SESC/Flamengo Rio (Rio de Janeiro (state))	2– 3	(São Paulo (state)) Sesi/Bauru Volleyball	25–17	22–25	31–33	26– 24	13–15	117–90	Report

==== Round 9 ====
Date	Time		Score		Set 1	Set 2	Set 3	Set 4	Set 5	Total	Report
12/11/2020	21:30	Itambé Minas (Minas Gerais)	3–0	(Rio de Janeiro (state)) SESC/Rio Flamengo	25–20	25–18	25–20			75–58	Report
12/12/2020	17:00	São Paulo/Barueri (São Paulo (state))	3–0	(São Paulo (state)) São Caetano	25–11	25–14	25–12			75–37	Report
12/12/2020	19:00	Fluminense (Rio de Janeiro (state))	3–0	(São Paulo (state)) Pinheiros	25–22	25–23	25–22			75–67	Report
12/12/2020	21:30	Osasco (São Paulo (state))	2–3	(Federal District (Brazil)) Brasília Vôlei	25–15	16–25	22–25	25–16	13–15	101–96	Report
12/22/2020	15:00	Curitiba Vôlei (Paraná (state))	3–0	(Paraná (state)) São José dos Pinhais	26–24	25–21	25–10			76–55	Report
12/29/2020	19:00	Sesi/Bauru Volleyball (São Paulo (state))	0–3	(Minas Gerais) Praia Clube	17–25	18–25	19–25			54–75	Report

==== 10th Round ====
Date	Time		Score		Set 1	Set 2	Set 3	Set 4	Set 5	Total	Report
12/18/2020	16:00	Brasília Vôlei (Federal District (Brazil))	0–3	(Paraná (state)) Sesi/Bauru Volleyball	16–25	18–25	19–25			53–75	Report
12/18/2020	20:00	Pinheiros (São Paulo (state))	2–3	(São Paulo (state)) São Paulo/Barueri	25–21	25–20	17–25	22–25	08–15	97–106	Report
12/18/2020	21:30	Praia Clube (Minas Gerais)	0–3	(Minas Gerais) Itambé Minas	19–25	21–25	17–25			57–75	Report
12/19/2020	19:00	São Caetano (São Paulo (state))	0–3	(São Paulo (state)) Osasco	14–25	21–25	18–25			53–75	Report
12/29/2020	19:00	São José dos Pinhais (Paraná (state))	0–3	(Rio de Janeiro (state)) SESC/Rio Flamengo	20–25	24–26	09–25			53–76	Report
05/01/2021	19:00	Curitiba Vôlei (Paraná (state))	3–1	(Rio de Janeiro (state)) Fluminense	25–23	22–25	25–19	26–24		98–91	Report

==== Round 11 ====
Date	Time		Score		Set 1	Set 2	Set 3	Set 4	Set 5	Total	Report
12/21/2020	21:30	Sesi/Bauru Volleyball (São Paulo (state))	3–0	(São Paulo (state)) São Caetano	25–19	25–14	25–17			75–50	Report
12/22/2020	19:00	SESC/Flamengo Rio (Rio de Janeiro (state))	3–1	(Minas Gerais) Praia Clube	25–21	19–25	25–21	26–24		95–91	Report
12/22/2020	21:30	Itambé Minas (Minas Gerais)	3–0	(Federal District (Brazil)) Brasília Vôlei	25–22	25–16	25–20			75–58	Report
12/23/2020	17:00	São Paulo/Barueri (São Paulo (state))	3–2	(Paraná (state)) Curitiba Vôlei	21–25	26–24	22–25	25–22	15–05	109–101	Report
12/23/2020	19:00	Osasco (São Paulo (state))	3–1	(São Paulo (state)) Pinheiros	25–22	25–23	21–25	25–16		96–86	Report
22/01/2021	19:00	Fluminense (Rio de Janeiro (state))	1–3	(Paraná (state)) São José dos Pinhais	18–25	25–22	25–27	25–27		93–101	Report

=== Return ===
- Location: The teams on the left side of the table play at home.

==== 1st Round ====
Date	Time		Score		Set 1	Set 2	Set 3	Set 4	Set 5	Total	Report
05/01/2021	19:00	Itambé Minas (Minas Gerais)	3–0	(São Paulo (state)) São Caetano	25–11	25–15	25–14			75–40	Report
08/01/2021	16:30	Sesi/Vôlei Bauru (São Paulo (state))	3–1	(São Paulo (state)) Pinheiros	23–25	25–20	25–18	25–23		98–86	Report
01/08/2021	20:00	Osasco (São Paulo (state))	3–1	(Paraná (state)) Curitiba Vôlei	19–25	28–26	25–21	25–20		97–92	Report
02/08/2021	19:00	Brasília Vôlei (Federal District (Brazil))	2–3	(Rio de Janeiro (state)) SESC/Rio Flamengo	25–20	21–25	23–25	25–19	13–15	107–104	Report
02/08/2021	21:30	São Paulo/Barueri (São Paulo (state))	3–0	(Rio de Janeiro (state)) Fluminense	25–13	25–22	25–11			75–46	Report
02/09/2021	16:30	Praia Clube (Minas Gerais)	3–0	(Paraná (state)) São José dos Pinhais	25–14	25–22	25–09			75–45	Report

==== 2nd Round ====
Date	Time		Score		Set 1	Set 2	Set 3	Set 4	Set 5	Total	Report
11/01/2021	19:00	Curitiba Vôlei (Paraná (state))	0-3	(São Paulo (state)) Sesi/Bauru Volleyball	17–25	24–26	25–27			66–78	Report
12/01/2021	19:00	São Paulo/Barueri (São Paulo (state))	3–0	(Paraná (state)) São José dos Pinhais	25–19	25–22	25–21			75–62	Report
12/01/2021	19:00	Brasília Vôlei (Federal District (Brazil))	0–3	(Minas Gerais) Praia Clube	12–25	11–25	16–25			39–75	Report
12/01/2021	19:30	Fluminense (Rio de Janeiro (state))	1–3	(São Paulo (state)) Osasco	25–23	14–25	15–25	15–25		69–98	Report
12/01/2021	20:00	Pinheiros (São Paulo (state))	1–3	(Minas Gerais) Itambé Minas	23–25	14–25	25–19	20–25		82–94	Report
12/01/2021	21:30	São Caetano (São Paulo (state))	0-3	(Rio de Janeiro (state)) SESC/Flamengo Rio	20–25	26–28	19–25			65–78	Report

==== 3rd Round ====
Date	Time		Score		Set 1	Set 2	Set 3	Set 4	Set 5	Total	Report
15/01/2021	19:00	SESC/Flamengo Rio (Rio de Janeiro (state))	3–0	(São Paulo (state)) Pinheiros	26–24	25–18	26–24			77–66	Report
15/01/2021	19:30	Praia Clube (Minas Gerais)	3–0	(São Paulo (state)) São Caetano	25–10	25–09	25–08			75–27	Report
15/01/2021	20:00	São José dos Pinhais (Paraná (state))	2–3	(Federal District (Brazil)) Brasília Vôlei	25–20	14–25	20–25	25–19	11–15	95–104	Report
15/01/2021	21:30	Osasco (São Paulo (state))	1–3	(São Paulo (state)) São Paulo/Barueri	25–21	21–25	23–25	14–25		83–96	Report
1/16/2021	19:00	Sesi/Vôlei Bauru (São Paulo (state))	3–0	(Rio de Janeiro (state)) Fluminense	25–17	25–16	25–15			75–48	Report
02/16/2021	19:00	Itambé Minas (Minas Gerais)	3–0	(Paraná (state)) Curitiba Vôlei	25–14	25–21	25–17			75–52	Report

==== 4th Round ====
Date	Time		Score		Set 1	Set 2	Set 3	Set 4	Set 5	Total	Report
19/01/2021	20:00	São Caetano (São Paulo (state))	1–3	(Federal District (Brazil)) Brasília Vôlei	11–25	18–25	25–22	05–25		59–97	Report
01/22/2021	21:30 PM	Pinheiros (São Paulo (state))	0–3	(Minas Gerais) Praia Clube	24–26	11–25	16–25			51–76	Report
03/02/2021	19:00	Fluminense (Rio de Janeiro (state))	0-3	(Minas Gerais) Itambé Minas	15–25	20–25	19–25			54–75	Report
02/15/2021	21:30	Osasco (São Paulo (state))	3–0	(Paraná (state)) São José dos Pinhais	25–21	25–18	25–16			75–55	Report
02/16/2021	19:00	Sesi/Bauru Volleyball (São Paulo (state))	2–3	(São Paulo (state)) São Paulo/Barueri	25–17	18–25	23–25	25–23	13–15	104–105	Report
03/01/2021	19:00	SESC/Flamengo Rio (Rio de Janeiro (state))	3–0	(Paraná (state)) Curitiba Vôlei	25–23	25–12	25–23			75–58	Report

==== 5th Round ====
Date	Time		Score		Set 1	Set 2	Set 3	Set 4	Set 5	Total	Report
01/26/2021	19:00	Itambé Minas (Minas Gerais)	3–0	(São Paulo (state)) São Paulo/Barueri	25–20	25–17	25–20			75–57	Report
01/26/2021	19:30	Fluminense (Rio de Janeiro (state))	0–3	(Rio de Janeiro (state)) SESC/Flamengo Rio	20–25	18–25	20–25			58–75	Report
26/01/2021	20:00	São José dos Pinhais (Paraná (state))	3–0	(São Paulo (state)) São Caetano	25–19	25–11	25–14			75–44	Report
01/26/2021	20:00	Brasília Vôlei (Federal District (Brazil))	3–1	(São Paulo (state)) Pinheiros	25–22	23–25	25–23	25–13		98–83	Report
02/03/2021	19:00	Sesi/Vôlei Bauru (São Paulo (state))	3–1	(São Paulo (state)) Osasco	23–25	25–18	25–22	25–15		98–80	Report
03/03/2021	18:00	Praia Clube (Minas Gerais)	3–0	(Paraná (state)) Curitiba Vôlei	25–16	25–19	25–23			75–58	Report

==== 6th Round ====
Date	Time		Score		Set 1	Set 2	Set 3	Set 4	Set 5	Total	Report
29/01/2021	19:00	São Paulo/Barueri (São Paulo (state))	3–0	(Rio de Janeiro (state)) SESC/Rio Flamengo	25–13	25–21	25–16			75–50	Report
29/01/2021	19:30	Fluminense (Rio de Janeiro (state))	0–3	(Minas Gerais) Praia Clube	11–25	18–25	15–25			44–75	Report
29/01/2021	20:00	Pinheiros (São Paulo (state))	3–0	(São Paulo (state)) São Caetano	25–14	23–13	25–16			73–43	Report
30/01/2021	19:00	Sesi/Vôlei Bauru (São Paulo (state))	3–0	(Paraná (state)) São José dos Pinhais	25–14	25–16	25–13			75–43	Report
02/09/2021	19:00	Osasco (São Paulo (state))	0–3	(Minas Gerais) Itambé Minas	20–25	19–25	22–25			61–75	Report
02/14/2021	20:30	Brasília Vôlei (Federal District (Brazil))	2–3	(Paraná (state)) Curitiba Vôlei	22–25	25–22	25–22	19–25	12–15	103–109	Report

==== Round 7 ====
Date	Time		Score		Set 1	Set 2	Set 3	Set 4	Set 5	Total	Report
02/02/2021	16:30	Praia Clube (Minas Gerais)	3–0	(São Paulo (state)) São Paulo/Barueri	25–20	35–33	25–09			85–62	Report
02/02/2021	19:00	SESC/Flamengo Rio (Rio de Janeiro (state))	2– 3	(São Paulo (state)) Osasco	13–25	21–25	25–20	25–22	04–15	88–107	
02/02/2021	20:00	São José dos Pinhais (Paraná (state))	0–3	(São Paulo (state)) Pinheiros	17–25	22–25	21–25			60–75	Report
02/02/2021	20:00	São Caetano (São Paulo (state))	1–3	(Paraná (state)) Curitiba Vôlei	15–25	22–25	25–20	15–25		77–95	Report
02/02/2021	20:00	Brasília Vôlei (Federal District (Brazil))	3–1	(Rio de Janeiro (state)) Fluminense	25–18	26–24	18–25	25–19		94–86	Report
02/13/2021	21:30	Itambé Minas (Minas Gerais)	3–1	(São Paulo (state)) Sesi/Bauru Volleyball	25–17	25–21	24–26	26–24		100–88	Report

==== 8th Round ====
Date	Time		Score		Set 1	Set 2	Set 3	Set 4	Set 5	Total	Report
02/19/2021	19:00	Itambé Minas (Minas Gerais)	3–0	(Paraná (state)) São José dos Pinhais	25–22	25–21	25–17			75–60	Report
19/02/2021	19:00	Sesi/Vôlei Bauru (São Paulo (state))	3–1	(Rio de Janeiro (state)) SESC/Flamengo Rio	28–30	25–18	25–14	25– 20		103–62	Report
02/19/2021	19:30	Fluminense (Rio de Janeiro (state))	3–0	(São Paulo (state)) São Caetano	25–21	25–19	25–22			75–62	Report
02/19/2021	19:30	Curitiba Vôlei (Paraná (state))	1–3	(São Paulo (state)) Pines	25–27	22–25	25–15	22–25		94–92	Report
02/19/2021	21:30	Osasco (São Paulo (state))	3–0	(Minas Gerais) Praia Clube	25–22	25–22	25–18			75–62	Report
02/20/2021	20:00	São Paulo/Barueri (São Paulo (state))	1–3	(Federal District (Brazil)) Brasília Vôlei	25–16	18–25	22–25	23–25		88–91	Report

==== Round 9 ====
Date	Time		Score		Set 1	Set 2	Set 3	Set 4	Set 5	Total	Report
02/22/2021	19:30	Brasília Vôlei (Federal District (Brazil))	0–3	(São Paulo (state)) Osasco	16–25	17–25	23–25			56–75	Report
02/23/2021	16:30	Praia Clube (Minas Gerais)	2–3	(São Paulo (state)) Sesi/Bauru Volleyball	25–21	27–29	25–20	25–27	13–15	115–112	
02/23/2021	19:00	SESC/Flamengo Rio (Rio de Janeiro (state))	0– 3	(Minas Gerais) Itambé Minas	16–25	21–25	23–25			60–75	Report
02/23/2021	20:00	São José dos Pinhais (Paraná (state))	0–3	(Paraná (state)) Curitiba Vôlei	19–25	20–25	22–25			61–75	Report
02/23/2021	20:00	Pinheiros (São Paulo (state))	2–3	(Rio de Janeiro (state)) Fluminense	22–25	17–25	25–21	25–14	10–15	99–100	Report
02/23/2021	20:00	São Caetano (São Paulo (state))	0–3	(São Paulo (state)) São Paulo/Barueri	17–25	14–25	17–25			48–75	Report

==== 10th Round ====
Date	Time		Score		Set 1	Set 2	Set 3	Set 4	Set 5	Total	Report
02/26/2021	21:30	Itambé Minas (Minas Gerais)	3–1	(Minas Gerais) Praia Clube	23–25	25–23	27–25	28–26		103–99	Report
02/26/2021	19:00	São Paulo/Barueri (São Paulo (state))	3–1	(São Paulo (state)) Pinheiros	25–19	24–26	25–17	25–11		99–73	Report
02/26/2021	19:30	SESC/Flamengo Rio (Rio de Janeiro (state))	3–1	(Paraná (state)) São José dos Pinhais	25–18	25–17	23–25	31– 29		104–60	Report
02/26/2021	18:00	Sesi/Bauru Volleyball (São Paulo (state))	3–0	(Federal District (Brazil)) Brasília Vôlei	25–14	25–21	25–22			75–57	Report
02/26/2021	19:30	Fluminense (Rio de Janeiro (state))	2–3	(Paraná (state)) Curitiba Vôlei	25–23	18–25	18–25	26–24	11–15	98–112	Report
02/27/2021	19:00	Osasco (São Paulo (state))	3–0	(São Paulo (state)) São Caetano	25–14	25–07	25–13			75–34	Report

==== Round 11 ====
Date	Time		Score		Set 1	Set 2	Set 3	Set 4	Set 5	Total	Report
05/03/2021	11:30 am	Sesi/Vôlei Bauru (São Paulo (state))	3–0	(São Paulo (state)) São Caetano	25–19	25–21	25–17			75–57	Report
05/03/2021	16:00	São José dos Pinhais (Paraná (state))	1–3	(Rio de Janeiro (state)) Fluminense	25–18	23–25	25–27	20–25		93–95	Report
03/05/2021	16:30	Praia Clube (Minas Gerais)	3–0	(Rio de Janeiro (state)) SESC/Rio Flamengo	25–19	25–22	25–22			75–63	Report
05/03/2021	19:00	São Paulo/Barueri (São Paulo (state))	3–2	(Paraná (state)) Curitiba Vôlei	20–25	17–25	25–12	25–16	15–11	102–89	Report
05/03/2021	19:00	Brasília Vôlei (Federal District (Brazil))	0–3	(Minas Gerais) Itambé Minas	16–25	23–25	23–25			62–75	Report
05/03/2021	20:00	Pinheiros (São Paulo (state))	3–1	(São Paulo (state)) Osasco	19–25	26–24	25–23	25–18		95–90	Report

== Playoffs ==
Quarter-finals
1st	(Minas Gerais) Itambé Minas	3	3
8th	(Federal District (Brazil)) Brasília Vôlei	0	0
4th	(São Paulo (state)) Sesi/Bauru Volleyball	1	3	3
5th	(Rio de Janeiro (state)) SESC/Flamengo Rio	3	0	2
2nd	(São Paulo (state)) Osasco	3	3
7th	(Paraná (state)) Curitiba Vôlei	2	1
3rd	(Minas Gerais) Praia Clube	3	3
6th	(São Paulo (state)) São Paulo/Barueri	2	0

Semifinals
1st	(Minas Gerais) Itambé Minas	3	3
4th	(São Paulo (state)) Sesi/Bauru Volleyball	1	2
2nd	(São Paulo (state)) Osasco	2	0
3rd	(Minas Gerais) Praia Clube	3	3

End
1st	(Minas Gerais) Itambé Minas	1	3	3
3rd	(Minas Gerais) Praia Clube	3	1	2

== Playoff matches ==
=== Quarter-finals ===
- Location: The teams on the left side of the table play at home.

==== Game 1 ====
Date	Time		Score		Set 1	Set 2	Set 3	Set 4	Set 5	Total	Report
03/11/2021	19:00	SESI Volei Bauru (São Paulo (state))	1–3	(Rio de Janeiro (state)) SESC/Rio Flamengo	18–25	22–25	28–26	21– 25		89–76	Report
03/12/2021	19:00	Osasco (São Paulo (state))	3–2	(Paraná (state)) Curitiba Vôlei	28–26	25–18	23–25	24–26	15–13	115–108	Report
03/13/2021	19:00	Itambé Minas (Minas Gerais)	3–0	(Federal District (Brazil)) Brasília Vôlei	25–19	28–26	25–16			78–61	Report
03/14/2021	11:00	São Paulo/Barueri (São Paulo (state))	2–3	(Minas Gerais) Praia Clube	19–25	25–17	14–25	25–23	14–16	97–106	Report

==== Game 2 ====
Date	Time		Score		Set 1	Set 2	Set 3	Set 4	Set 5	Total	Report
03/14/2021	14:00	Curitiba Vôlei (Paraná (state))	1–3	(São Paulo (state)) Osasco	21–25	25–16	18–25	19–25		83–91	Report
03/15/2021	19:00	SESC/Flamengo Rio (Rio de Janeiro (state))	0– 3	(São Paulo (state)) SESI Volei Bauru	20–25	20–25	22–25			62–75	Report
/03/17/2021	14:00	Brasília Vôlei (Federal District (Brazil))	0–3	(Minas Gerais) Itambé Minas	13–25	17–25	16–25			46–75	Report
03/18/2021	14:00	Praia Clube (Minas Gerais)	3–0	(São Paulo (state)) São Paulo/Barueri	25–16	25–13	25–21			75–50	Report

==== Game 3 ====
Date	Time		Score		Set 1	Set 2	Set 3	Set 4	Set 5	Total	Report
19/03/2021	19:00	SESI Volei Bauru (São Paulo (state))	3–2	(Rio de Janeiro (state)) SESC/Rio Flamengo	25–27	25–18	25–22	19– 25	15–10	109–77	Report

=== Semifinal ===
- Location: The games take place at the CDV in Saquarema.

==== Game 1 ====
Date	Time		Score		Set 1	Set 2	Set 3	Set 4	Set 5	Total	Report
03/26/2021	19:00	Osasco (São Paulo (state))	2–3	(Minas Gerais) Praia Clube	21–25	25–19	25–18	17–25	12–15	100–102	Report
03/26/2021	21:30	Itambé Minas (Minas Gerais)	3–1	(São Paulo (state)) SESI Volei Bauru	25–22	24–26	25–19	25–17		99–84	Report

==== Game 2 ====
Date	Time		Score		Set 1	Set 2	Set 3	Set 4	Set 5	Total	Report
03/28/2021	19:00	Praia Clube (Minas Gerais)	3–0	(São Paulo (state)) Osasco	25–12	25–18	25–22			75–52	Report
03/28/2021	21:30	SESI Volei Bauru (São Paulo (state))	2–3	(Minas Gerais) Itambé Minas	25–17	22–25	25–17	17–25	8–15	97–99	Report

=== End ===
- Location: The games take place at the CDV in Saquarema.

==== Game 1 ====
Date	Time		Score		Set 1	Set 2	Set 3	Set 4	Set 5	Total	Report
04/01/2021	20:00	Itambé Minas (Minas Gerais)	1–3	(Minas Gerais) Praia Clube	21–25	12–25	25–21	22–25		80–96	Report

==== Game 2 ====
Date	Time		Score		Set 1	Set 2	Set 3	Set 4	Set 5	Total	Report
04/03/2021	21:00	Praia Clube (Minas Gerais)	1–3	(Minas Gerais) Itambé Minas	25–19	20–25	25–27	23–25		93–96	Report

==== Game 3 ====
Date	Time		Score		Set 1	Set 2	Set 3	Set 4	Set 5	Total	Report
05/04/2021	21:00	Itambé Minas (Minas Gerais)	3–2	(Minas Gerais) Praia Clube	25–17	13–25	12–25	25–18	15–11	90–96	Report

== Awards ==
Superliga 2020/2021

Itambé Minas
Champion
(4th Brazilian title)

=== Superliga Selection ===
The athletes who stood out individually were

Position	Player	Team
MVP	(Brazil) Thaísa	(Minas Gerais) Itambé Minas
Best Opposite	(Brazil) Tandara	(São Paulo (state)) Osasco
1st Best Outside Hitter	(Brazil) Fê Garay	(Minas Gerais) Praia Clube
2nd Best Outsited Hitter	(Brazil) Pri Daroit	(Minas Gerais) Itambé Minas
1st Best Center	(Brazil) Thaísa	(Minas Gerais) Itambé Minas
2nd Best Center	(Brazil) Carol	(Minas Gerais) Praia Clube
Best Setter	(Brazil) Macris Carneiro	(Minas Gerais) Itambé Minas
Best Libero	(Brazil) Camila Brait	(São Paulo (state)) Osasco
Final MVP (VivaVôlei Trophy)	(Brazil) Macris Carneiro	(Minas Gerais) Itambé Minas
Fan Favorite	(Brazil) Thaísa	(Minas Gerais) Itambé Minas
Best Coach	(Italy) Nicola Negro	(Minas Gerais) Itambé Minas

== Final classification ==
Position	Team	rating/downgrade
1st place, gold medalist(s)	(Minas Gerais) Itambé Minas	▲ South American Clubs 2021; Superliga 2021/2022 - Serie A
2nd place, silver medalist(s)	(Minas Gerais) Praia Clube	Superliga 2021/2022 - Series A
3rd place, bronze medalist(s)	(São Paulo (state)) Osasco	Superliga 2021/2022 - Series A
4	(São Paulo (state)) SESI Volei Bauru	Superliga 2021/2022 - Series A
5	(Rio de Janeiro (state)) SESC/Rio Flamengo	Superliga 2021/2022 - Series A
6	(São Paulo (state)) São Paulo/Barueri	Superliga 2021/2022 - Series A
7	(Paraná (state)) Curitiba Vôlei	Superliga 2021/2022 - Series A
8	(Federal District (Brazil)) Brasília Vôlei	Superliga 2021/2022 - Series A
9	(São Paulo (state)) Pinheiros	Superliga 2021/2022 - Series A
10	(Rio de Janeiro (state)) Fluminense	Superliga 2021/2022 - Series A
11	(Paraná (state)) São José dos Pinhais	▼ Series B 2022
12	(São Paulo (state)) São Caetano	▼ Series B 2022

== Statistics ==
=== Highest Scorer ===
Rank	Player	Club	Total
1	(Azerbaijan) Polina Rahimova	(São Paulo (state)) Sesi/Vôlei Bauru	440
2	(Brazil) Tandara	(São Paulo (state)) Osasco	409
3	(Dominican Republic) Brayelin Martínez	(Minas Gerais) Praia Clube	403
4	(Brazil) Thaísa	(Minas Gerais) Itambé Minas	382
5	(Brazil) Ariane Helena	(Federal District (Brazil)) Brasília Vôlei	380
6	(Brazil) Ivna Colombo	(Paraná (state)) Curitiba Vôlei	374
7	(Brazil) Fê Garay	(Minas Gerais) Praia Clube	362
8	(Brazil) Pri Daroit	(Minas Gerais) Itambé Minas	320
9	(Brazil) Ana Cristina	(Rio de Janeiro (state)) SESC/Rio Flamengo	318
10	(Brazil) Tifanny	(São Paulo (state)) Sesi/Vôlei Bauru	312

All points scored | Source: CBV

=== Best Blocker ===
Rank	Player	Club	Total
1	(Brazil) Thaísa	(Minas Gerais) Itambé Minas	111
2	(Brazil) Mayany	(São Paulo (state)) Osasco	109
3	(Brazil) Carol	(Minas Gerais) Praia Clube	81
4	(Brazil) Lorena Viezel	(São Paulo (state)) São Paulo/Barueri	71
5	(Brazil) Valkyrie Dullius	(Rio de Janeiro (state)) SESC/Rio Flamengo	70
6	(Brazil) Diana	(São Paulo (state)) São Paulo/Barueri	67
7	(Brazil) Bia	(São Paulo (state)) Osasco	62
7	(Brazil) Adenízia	(São Paulo (state)) Sesi/Vôlei Bauru	62
9	(Dominican Republic) Jineiry Martínez	(Minas Gerais) Praia Clube	51
9	(Brazil) Juciely Barreto	(Rio de Janeiro (state)) SESC/Rio Flamengo	51

Points scored with winning blocks | Source: CBV

=== Best Servers ===
Rank	Player	Club	Total
1	(Azerbaijan) Polina Rahimova	(São Paulo (state)) Sesi/Vôlei Bauru	31
2	(Brazil) Pri Daroit	(Minas Gerais) Itambé Minas	29
3	(Brazil) Thaísa	(Minas Gerais) Itambé Minas	28
4	(Brazil) Claudinha	(Minas Gerais) Praia Clube	26
5	(Brazil) Carol	(Minas Gerais) Praia Clube	23
5	(Brazil) Ariane Helena	(Federal District (Brazil)) Brasília Vôlei	23
7	(Brazil) Roberta Ratzke	(São Paulo (state)) Osasco	22
8	(Brazil) Larissa Gongra	(Paraná (state)) São José dos Pinhais	21
8	(Brazil) Tandara	(São Paulo (state)) Osasco	21
10	(Brazil) Carla Santos	(Paraná (state)) São José dos Pinhais	20
10	(Brazil) Dani Lins	(São Paulo (state)) Sesi/Vôlei Bauru	20

Points scored in the serve ace | Source: CBV
