= Brazilian Women's Volleyball Super League 2025–26 =

2025–26 Brazilian Women's Volleyball Super League
- League: Brazilian Women's Volleyball Super League
- Sport: Volleyball
- Duration: 20 October 2025 – 3 May 2026
- Teams: 12

Regular Season
- Season champions
- Top scorer

Finals
- Champions
- Runners-up
- Finals MVP

Brazilian Women's Volleyball Super League seasons
- ← 2024–25 2026–27 →

The 2025–26 Super League Série A (in Portuguese: Superliga Série A) is the 31st season of the highest professional Brazilian Women's Volleyball League. The season takes place from October 2025 to May 2026 and is contested by twelve teams.

== Format ==
The regular season consists of 24 rounds, where the twelve participating teams play each other twice (once home and once away). At the completion of the regular season, the eight best teams advance to the championship playoffs, and the teams finishing 11th and 12th are relegated to Super League B. The standings criteria:

- highest number of result points (points awarded for results: 3 points for 3–0 or 3–1 wins, 2 points for 3–2 win, 1 point for 2–3 loss);
- highest number of matches won;
- highest set quotient (the number of total sets won divided by the number of total sets lost);
- highest points quotient (the number of total points scored divided by the number of total points conceded).

== Teams ==
The season is contested by twelve teams:

Team	City	Venue	Capacity	Club locations in Brazil (2025–26 season).
Brasília Vôlei	(Federal District (Brazil)) Brasília	Sesi Taguatinga	1,000	Club locations in Brazil (2025–26 season).
Fluminense	(Rio de Janeiro (state)) Rio de Janeiro	Hebraica	1,000	Club locations in Brazil (2025–26 season).
Mackenzie	(Minas Gerais) Belo Horizonte	Ginásio Mackenzie	900	Club locations in Brazil (2025–26 season).
Maringá	(Paraná (state)) Maringá	Ginásio Chico Neto	4,500	Club locations in Brazil (2025–26 season).
Minas	(Minas Gerais) Belo Horizonte	Arena Minas	3,650	Club locations in Brazil (2025–26 season).
Osasco	(São Paulo (state)) Osasco	Ginásio José Liberatti	4,500	Club locations in Brazil (2025–26 season).
Paulistano Barueri	(São Paulo (state)) Barueri	Ginásio José Corrêa	5,000	Club locations in Brazil (2025–26 season).
Praia Clube	(Minas Gerais) Uberlândia	Arena Praia	3,000	Club locations in Brazil (2025–26 season).
Renasce Sorocaba	(São Paulo (state)) Sorocaba	Sesi Sorocaba	500	Club locations in Brazil (2025–26 season).
SESC Flamengo	(Rio de Janeiro (state)) Rio de Janeiro	Maracanãzinho	1,000	Club locations in Brazil (2025–26 season).
SESI Bauru	(São Paulo (state)) Bauru	Ginásio Paulo Skaf	5,000	Club locations in Brazil (2025–26 season).
Tijuca Tênis Clube	(Rio de Janeiro (state)) Rio de Janeiro	Ginásio Tijuca	2,000	Club locations in Brazil (2025–26 season).

== Regular season ==
=== League table ===
Pos	Team	Pld	W	L	Pts	SW	SL	SR	SPW	SPL	SPR	Qualification or relegation
1	(Minas Gerais) Minas	18	16	2	47	50	16	3.125	1551	1307	1.187	Championship playoffs
2	(Rio de Janeiro (state)) SESC Flamengo	18	16	2	46	51	14	3.643	1546	1336	1.157	Championship playoffs
3	(Minas Gerais) Praia Clube	18	13	5	39	41	18	2.278	1401	1271	1.102	Championship playoffs
4	(São Paulo (state)) Osasco	18	13	5	39	43	25	1.720	1572	1432	1.098	Championship playoffs
5	(São Paulo (state)) SESI Bauru	18	12	6	35	39	25	1.560	1473	1362	1.081	Championship playoffs
6	(Rio de Janeiro (state)) Fluminense	18	11	7	27	37	34	1.088	1543	1514	1.019	Championship playoffs
7	(Paraná (state)) Maringá	18	8	10	25	32	36	0.889	1480	1488	0.995	Championship playoffs
8	(Minas Gerais) Mackenzie	18	7	11	20	27	40	0.675	1458	1481	0.984	Championship playoffs
9	(São Paulo (state)) Paulistano Barueri	18	4	14	15	23	46	0.500	1432	1568	0.913	Remain in Serie A
10	(Federal District (Brazil)) Brasília Vôlei	18	4	14	13	24	46	0.522	1429	1607	0.889	Remain in Serie A
11	(Rio de Janeiro (state)) Tijuca Tênis Clube	18	3	15	12	20	50	0.400	1417	1597	0.887	Relegated to Serie B
12	(São Paulo (state)) Renasce Sorocaba	18	1	17	6	16	53	0.302	1290	1629	0.792	Relegated to Serie B

Updated to match(es) played on 21 February 2026. Source: Super League

=== Results table ===
Home \ Away	BRA	FLU	MAC	MAR	MIN	OSA	BAR	PRA	SOR	FLA	BAU	TIJ
Brasília Vôlei		0–3	3–0	1–3	1–3	1–3			3–0	0–3		1–3
Fluminense			1–3	3–2	0–3	3–2	1–3	3–1	3–2	0–3		
Mackenzie		2–3			3–0	1–3	3–1	0–3	3–0	1–3	0–3	3–1
Maringá	3–2	3–0	3–0		1–3	1–3	3–1	0–3		0–3	0–3	3–0
Minas	3–1	3–1	3–1	3–0			3–0	3–0			3–1	3–0
Osasco	3–2		3–0	3–1	2–3		3–0		3–0	0–3		3–0
Paulistano Barueri	2–3	0–3	2–3		2–3	1–3		0–3		0–3	2–3	
Praia Clube	3–1		3–1	3–1	0–3	3–0			3–0	1–3	3–0	
Renasce Sorocaba		0–3	2–3	1–3	0–3	1–3	1–3	0–3			1–3	3–2
SESC Flamengo	3–0	2–3		1–3	3–2			3–0	3–2		3–0	3–0
SESI Bauru	3–0	0–3	3–0			0–3	3–0	0–3	3–1	2–3		3–0
Tijuca Tênis Clube	2–3	2–3		3–2	0–3	2–3	2–3	0–3	3–2	0–3	0–3	

Updated to match(es) played on 10 November 2025. Source:
Legend: Blue = left column team win; Red = top row team win.

=== Fixture and results ===
- All times are local, BRT (UTC−03:00).

Round 1

Date	Time		Score		Set 1	Set 2	Set 3	Set 4	Set 5	Total	Report
20 Oct	18:30	Fluminense (Rio de Janeiro (state))	3–2	(Paraná (state)) Maringá	18–25	21–25	25–18	25–22	15–8	104–98	Report
20 Oct	18:30	SESC Flamengo (Rio de Janeiro (state))	3–0	(São Paulo (state)) Paulistano Barueri	25–12	25–19	26–24			76–55	Report
20 Oct	21:00	Praia Clube (Minas Gerais)	3–1	(Federal District (Brazil)) Brasília Vôlei	25–23	25–20	21–25	25–21		96–89	Report
21 Oct	21:00	Minas (Minas Gerais)	3–1	(Minas Gerais) Mackenzie	25–12	25–18	21–25	25–21		96–76	Report
22 Oct	18:30	Tijuca (Rio de Janeiro (state))	2–3	(São Paulo (state)) Osasco	26–24	17–25	16–25	25–22	9–15	93–111	Report
22 Oct	18:30	SESI Bauru (São Paulo (state))	3–1	(São Paulo (state)) Renasce Sorocaba	22–25	25–17	25–19	25–20		97–81	Report

Round 2

Date	Time		Score		Set 1	Set 2	Set 3	Set 4	Set 5	Total	Report
24 Oct	21:00	Praia Clube (Minas Gerais)	3–1	(Paraná (state)) Maringá	25–17	23–25	25–23	25–22		98–87	Report
25 Oct	16:00	Tijuca (Rio de Janeiro (state))	2–3	(Federal District (Brazil)) Brasília Vôlei	25–19	25–16	27–29	20–25	12–15	109–104	Report
25 Oct	18:30	Osasco (São Paulo (state))	3–0	(São Paulo (state)) Renasce Sorocaba	25–10	25–21	25–20			75–51	Report
25 Oct	18:30	Paulistano Barueri (São Paulo (state))	2–3	(Minas Gerais) Minas	20–25	25–23	20–25	25–22	12–15	102–110	Report
25 Oct	21:00	SESI Bauru (São Paulo (state))	3–0	(Minas Gerais) Mackenzie	25–21	25–17	25–14			75–52	Report
9 Dec	21:00	Fluminense (Rio de Janeiro (state))	0–3	(Rio de Janeiro (state)) SESC Flamengo	28–30	21–25	21–25			70–80	Report

Round 3

Date	Time		Score		Set 1	Set 2	Set 3	Set 4	Set 5	Total	Report
30 Oct	18:30	Mackenzie (Minas Gerais)	3–0	(São Paulo (state)) Renasce Sorocaba	25–7	25–11	25–13			75–31	Report
30 Oct	18:30	Maringá (Paraná (state))	3–0	(Rio de Janeiro (state)) Tijuca	25–22	25–10	25–20			75–52	Report
30 Oct	21:00	Brasília Vôlei (Federal District (Brazil))	1–3	(São Paulo (state)) Osasco	17–25	16–25	25–19	17–25		75–94	Report
31 Oct	18:30	Paulistano Barueri (São Paulo (state))	2–3	(São Paulo (state)) SESI Bauru	25–23	25–21	17–25	21–25	3–15	91–109	Report
31 Oct	18:30	Minas (Minas Gerais)	3–1	(Rio de Janeiro (state)) Fluminense	25–20	25–21	21–25	25–19		96–85	[ Report]
31 Oct	21:00	SESC Flamengo (Rio de Janeiro (state))	3–0	(Minas Gerais) Praia Clube	25–22	25–22	26–24			76–68	[ Report]

Round 4

Date	Time		Score		Set 1	Set 2	Set 3	Set 4	Set 5	Total	Report
6 Nov	18:30	Renasce Sorocaba (São Paulo (state))	1–3	(São Paulo (state)) Paulistano Barueri	25–23	23–25	19–25	23–25		90–98	Report
6 Nov	18:30	Tijuca (Rio de Janeiro (state))	0–3	(Rio de Janeiro (state)) SESC Flamengo	20–25	21–25	24–26			65–76	Report
7 Nov	18:30	Maringá (Paraná (state))	3–2	(Federal District (Brazil)) Brasília Vôlei	25–18	16–25	25–20	21–25	15–9	102–97	Report
7 Nov	19:00	Osasco (São Paulo (state))	3–0	(Minas Gerais) Mackenzie	25–17	34–32	25–23			84–72	Report
7 Nov	21:00	Praia Clube (Minas Gerais)	0–3	(Minas Gerais) Minas	24–26	18–25	17–25			59–76	Report
9 Nov	19:30	SESI Bauru (São Paulo (state))	0–3	(Rio de Janeiro (state)) Fluminense	23–25	20–25	20–25			63–75	[ Report]

Round 5

Date	Time		Score		Set 1	Set 2	Set 3	Set 4	Set 5	Total	Report
12 Nov	18:30	Minas (Minas Gerais)	3–0	(Rio de Janeiro (state)) Tijuca	25–19	25–14	25–16			75–49	Report
13 Nov	18:30	Fluminense (Rio de Janeiro (state))	3–2	(São Paulo (state)) Renasce Sorocaba	25–20	25–22	21–25	20–25	15–6	106–98	[ Report]
13 Nov	21:30	Maringá (Paraná (state))	1–3	(São Paulo (state)) Osasco	17–25	19–25	25–12	22–25		83–87	[ Report]
14 Nov	18:30	SESC Flamengo (Rio de Janeiro (state))	3–0	(Federal District (Brazil)) Brasília Vôlei	25–18	25–16	25–23			75–57	[ Report]
14 Nov	19:00	Paulistano Barueri (São Paulo (state))	2–3	(Minas Gerais) Mackenzie	19–25	17–25	26–24	25–20	13–15	100–109	[ Report]
14 Nov	21:30	Praia Clube (Minas Gerais)	3–0	(São Paulo (state)) SESI Bauru	25–17	25–23	25–17			75–57	[ Report]

Round 6

Date	Time		Score		Set 1	Set 2	Set 3	Set 4	Set 5	Total	Report
17 Nov	19:00	Osasco (São Paulo (state))	3–0	(São Paulo (state)) Paulistano Barueri	25–19	25–18	25–21			75–58	Report
18 Nov	18:30	Brasília Vôlei (Federal District (Brazil))	1–3	(Minas Gerais) Minas	25–18	20–25	22–25	11–25		78–93	Report
18 Nov	19:00	Mackenzie (Minas Gerais)	2–3	(Rio de Janeiro (state)) Fluminense	18–25	20–25	25–19	25–19	10–15	98–103	Report
18 Nov	21:30	Maringá (Paraná (state))	0–3	(Rio de Janeiro (state)) SESC Flamengo	24–26	23–25	23–25			70–76	Report
19 Nov	18:30	Renasce Sorocaba (São Paulo (state))	0–3	(Minas Gerais) Praia Clube	18–25	18–25	21–25			57–75	Report
21 Nov	18:30	SESI Bauru (São Paulo (state))	3–0	(Rio de Janeiro (state)) Tijuca	25–19	25–21	25–19			75–59	[ Report]

Round 7

Date	Time		Score		Set 1	Set 2	Set 3	Set 4	Set 5	Total	Report
24 Nov	18:30	Fluminense (Rio de Janeiro (state))	1–3	(São Paulo (state)) Paulistano Barueri	14–25	25–19	22–25	19–25		80–94	[ Report]
24 Nov	18:30	Minas (Minas Gerais)	3–0	(Paraná (state)) Maringá	25–21	25–19	25–21			75–61	[ Report]
24 Nov	21:00	Osasco (São Paulo (state))	0–3	(Rio de Janeiro (state)) SESC Flamengo	23–25	16–25	17–25			56–75	[ Report]
25 Nov	18:30	Praia Clube (Minas Gerais)	3–1	(Minas Gerais) Mackenzie	25–21	25–17	17–25	25–17		92–80	[ Report]
25 Nov	21:00	SESI Bauru (São Paulo (state))	3–0	(Federal District (Brazil)) Brasília Vôlei	25–13	25–19	25–20			75–52	[ Report]
26 Nov	18:30	Tijuca (Rio de Janeiro (state))	3–2	(São Paulo (state)) Renasce Sorocaba	23–25	20–25	25–17	25–21	15–11	108–99	[ Report]

Round 8

Date	Time		Score		Set 1	Set 2	Set 3	Set 4	Set 5	Total	Report
28 Nov	18:30	Fluminense (Rio de Janeiro (state))	3–2	(São Paulo (state)) Osasco	24–26	27–25	25–22	21–25	15–9	112–107	Report
28 Nov	18:30	Paulistano Barueri (São Paulo (state))	0–3	(Minas Gerais) Praia Clube	17–25	23–25	19–25			59–75	Report
28 Nov	21:00	SESC Flamengo (Rio de Janeiro (state))	3–2	(Minas Gerais) Minas	20–25	28–26	15–25	25–18	15–8	103–102	Report
30 Nov	18:30	Mackenzie (Minas Gerais)	3–1	(Rio de Janeiro (state)) Tijuca	25–19	25–12	24–26	25–21		99–78	Report
1 Dec	18:30	Maringá (Paraná (state))	0–3	(São Paulo (state)) SESI Bauru	21–25	19–25	22–25			62–75	Report
1 Dec	21:00	Brasília Vôlei (Federal District (Brazil))	3–0	(São Paulo (state)) Renasce Sorocaba	25–19	25–11	25–23			75–53	Report

Round 9

Date	Time		Score		Set 1	Set 2	Set 3	Set 4	Set 5	Total	Report
4 Dec	19:00	Osasco (São Paulo (state))	2–3	(Minas Gerais) Minas	21–25	26–24	21–25	25–14	10–15	103–103	Report
4 Dec	21:00	Tijuca (Rio de Janeiro (state))	2–3	(São Paulo (state)) Paulistano Barueri	20–25	21–25	25–23	25–19	9–15	100–107	Report
5 Dec	18:30	Renasce Sorocaba (São Paulo (state))	1–3	(Paraná (state)) Maringá	25–20	19–25	17–25	18–25		79–95	Report
5 Dec	21:00	SESI Bauru (São Paulo (state))	2–3	(Rio de Janeiro (state)) SESC Flamengo	22–25	25–21	25–22	21–25	13–15	106–108	Report
5 Dec	21:00	Brasília Vôlei (Federal District (Brazil))	3–0	(Minas Gerais) Mackenzie	28–26	25–18	25–17			78–61	[ Report]
4 Nov	20:00	Fluminense (Rio de Janeiro (state))	3–1	(Minas Gerais) Praia Clube	25–21	25–13	25–27	25–17		100–78	Report

Round 10

Date	Time		Score		Set 1	Set 2	Set 3	Set 4	Set 5	Total	Report
11 Dec	18:30	Paulistano Barueri (São Paulo (state))	2–3	(Federal District (Brazil)) Brasília Vôlei	25–16	23–25	25–16	22–25	11–15	106–97	Report
12 Dec	18:30	Minas (Minas Gerais)	3–1	(São Paulo (state)) SESI Bauru	25–18	25–23	20–25	25–20		95–86	Report
12 Dec	18:30	Maringá (Paraná (state))	3–0	(Minas Gerais) Mackenzie	25–21	25–22	25–19			75–62	Report
15 Dec	21:00	SESC Flamengo (Rio de Janeiro (state))	3–2	(São Paulo (state)) Renasce Sorocaba	22–25	25–18	24–26	25–19	15–8	111–96	Report
15 Dec	18:30	Tijuca (Rio de Janeiro (state))	2–3	(Rio de Janeiro (state)) Fluminense	20–25	25–23	26–28	25–16	5–15	101–107	Report
18 Dec	21:00	Praia Clube (Minas Gerais)	3–0	(São Paulo (state)) Osasco	25–21	28–26	25–18			78–65	Report

Round 11

Date	Time		Score		Set 1	Set 2	Set 3	Set 4	Set 5	Total	Report
19 Dec	18:30	Renasce Sorocaba (São Paulo (state))	0–3	(Minas Gerais) Minas	8–25	21–25	24–26			53–76	Report
19 Dec	18:30	Mackenzie (Minas Gerais)	1–3	(Rio de Janeiro (state)) SESC Flamengo	27–25	23–25	20–25	18–25		88–100	Report
19 Dec	21:00	Maringá (Paraná (state))	3–1	(São Paulo (state)) Paulistano Barueri	20–25	25–18	25–19	25–18		95–80	Report
21 Dec	18:30	Brasília Vôlei (Federal District (Brazil))	0–3	(Rio de Janeiro (state)) Fluminense	21–25	13–25	24–26			58–76	Report
22 Dec	18:30	Tijuca (Rio de Janeiro (state))	0–3	(Minas Gerais) Praia Clube	21–25	19–25	17–25			57–75	Report
22 Dec	21:00	SESI Bauru (São Paulo (state))	0–3	(São Paulo (state)) Osasco	21–25	18–25	21–25			60–75	Report

Round 12

Date	Time		Score		Set 1	Set 2	Set 3	Set 4	Set 5	Total	Report
6 Jan	18:30	Mackenzie (Minas Gerais)	3–0	(Minas Gerais) Minas	25–19	25–22	25–18			75–59	Report
6 Jan	20:00	Maringá (Paraná (state))	3–0	(Rio de Janeiro (state)) Fluminense	25–13	25–21	27–25			77–59	Report
6 Jan	21:00	Brasília Vôlei (Federal District (Brazil))	0–3	(Minas Gerais) Praia Clube	21–25	21–25	25–27			67–77	Report
7 Jan	18:30	Renasce Sorocaba (São Paulo (state))	1–3	(São Paulo (state)) SESI Bauru	18–25	14–25	25–23	23–25		80–98	Report
7 Jan	21:00	Paulistano Barueri (São Paulo (state))	0–3	(Rio de Janeiro (state)) SESC Flamengo	17–25	15–25	17–25			49–75	Report
8 Jan	21:00	Osasco (São Paulo (state))	3–0	(Rio de Janeiro (state)) Tijuca	25–18	25–18	25–22			75–58	Report

Round 13

Date	Time		Score		Set 1	Set 2	Set 3	Set 4	Set 5	Total	Report
11 Jan	18:30	SESC Flamengo (Rio de Janeiro (state))	2–3	(Rio de Janeiro (state)) Fluminense	25–16	20–25	22–25	25–14	8–15	100–95	Report
12 Jan	18:30	Minas (Minas Gerais)	3–0	(São Paulo (state)) Paulistano Barueri	25–18	25–23	25–20			75–61	Report
12 Jan	18:30	Mackenzie (Minas Gerais)	0–3	(São Paulo (state)) SESI Bauru	17–25	22–25	19–25			58–75	Report
12 Jan	21:00	Maringá (Paraná (state))	0–3	(Minas Gerais) Praia Clube	19–25	16–25	15–25			50–75	Report
12 Jan	21:00	Renasce Sorocaba (São Paulo (state))	1–3	(São Paulo (state)) Osasco SCS	28–26	20–25	18–25	18–25		84–101	Report
13 Jan	18:30	Brasília Vôlei (Federal District (Brazil))	1–3	(Rio de Janeiro (state)) Tijuca	15–25	18–25	25–23	25–27		83–100	[ Report]

Round 14

Date	Time		Score		Set 1	Set 2	Set 3	Set 4	Set 5	Total	Report
16 Jan	18:30	Tijuca (Rio de Janeiro (state))	3–2	(Paraná (state)) Maringá	18–25	26–24	25–19	20–25	15–12	104–105	Report
16 Jan	18:30	Praia Clube (Minas Gerais)	1–3	(Rio de Janeiro (state)) SESC Flamengo	18–25	21–25	25–21	20–25		84–96	Report
16 Jan	21:00	SESI Bauru (São Paulo (state))	3–0	(São Paulo (state)) Paulistano Barueri	25–22	25–17	25–23			75–62	Report
17 Jan	18:30	Renasce Sorocaba (São Paulo (state))	2–3	(Minas Gerais) Mackenzie	28–26	25–21	14–25	8–25	9–15	84–112	Report
17 Jan	18:30	Osasco (São Paulo (state))	3–2	(Federal District (Brazil)) Brasília Vôlei	25–22	25–19	23–25	20–25	15–8	108–99	Report
17 Jan	21:00	Fluminense (Rio de Janeiro (state))	0–3	(Minas Gerais) Minas	19–25	9–25	21–25			49–75	Report

Round 15

Date	Time		Score		Set 1	Set 2	Set 3	Set 4	Set 5	Total	Report
29 Jan	18:30	Paulistano Barueri (São Paulo (state))	3–0	(São Paulo (state)) Renasce Sorocaba	25–18	25–21	25–13			75–52	Report
30 Jan	18:30	SESC Flamengo (Rio de Janeiro (state))	3–0	(Rio de Janeiro (state)) Tijuca	25–18	25–21	27–25			77–64	Report
30 Jan	20:00	Fluminense (Rio de Janeiro (state))	1–3	(São Paulo (state)) SESI Bauru	22–25	25–13	14–25	22–25		83–88	Report
30 Jan	21:00	Minas (Minas Gerais)	3–0	(Minas Gerais) Praia Clube	25–23	25–22	25–22			75–67	Report
31 Jan	18:30	Brasília Vôlei (Federal District (Brazil))	1–3	(Paraná (state)) Maringá	12–25	26–24	24–26	20–25		82–100	Report
31 Jan	21:00	Mackenzie (Minas Gerais)	1–3	(São Paulo (state)) Osasco SCS	21–25	27–25	21–25	18–25		87–100	Report

Round 16

Date	Time		Score		Set 1	Set 2	Set 3	Set 4	Set 5	Total	Report
5 Fev	18:30	Renasce Sorocaba (São Paulo (state))	0–3	(Rio de Janeiro (state)) Fluminense	20–25	21–25	10–25			51–75	Report
5 Fev	19:00	Mackenzie (Minas Gerais)	3–1	(São Paulo (state)) Paulistano Barueri	22–25	25–22	25–17	25–23		97–87	Report
5 Fev	21:00	Osasco (São Paulo (state))	3–1	(Paraná (state)) Maringá	18–25	25–10	25–19	25–21		93–75	Report
6 Fev	18:30	Tijuca (Rio de Janeiro (state))	0–3	(Minas Gerais) Minas	18–25	15–25	14–25			47–75	Report
6 Fev	19:00	Brasília Vôlei (Federal District (Brazil))	0–3	(Rio de Janeiro (state)) SESC Flamengo	18–25	19–25	19–25			56–75	Report
6 Fev	21:00	SESI Bauru (São Paulo (state))	0–3	(Minas Gerais) Praia Clube	21–25	27–29	22–25			70–79	Report

Round 17

Date	Time		Score		Set 1	Set 2	Set 3	Set 4	Set 5	Total	Report
10 Fev	19:00	Fluminense (Rio de Janeiro (state))	1–3	(Minas Gerais) Mackenzie	25–23	21–25	22–25	21–25		89–98	Report
10 Fev	21:30	Paulistano Barueri (São Paulo (state))	1–3	(São Paulo (state)) Osasco SCS	18–25	23–25	26–24	27–29		94–103	Report
11 Fev	18:30	Praia Clube (Minas Gerais)	3–0	(São Paulo (state)) Renasce Sorocaba	25–21	25–13	25–17			75–51	Report
11 Fev	19:00	Minas (Minas Gerais)	3–1	(Federal District (Brazil)) Brasília Vôlei	25–23	22–25	25–18	25–12		97–78	Report
11 Fev	21:30	Tijuca (Rio de Janeiro (state))	0–3	(São Paulo (state)) SESI Bauru	27–29	23–25	21–25			71–79	Report
12 Fev	19:30	SESC Flamengo (Rio de Janeiro (state))	1–3	(Paraná (state)) Maringá	25–19	24–26	23–25	20–25		92–95	Report

Round 18

Date	Time		Score		Set 1	Set 2	Set 3	Set 4	Set 5	Total	Report
27 Jan	18:30	Brasília Vôlei (Federal District (Brazil))	2–3	(São Paulo (state)) SESI Bauru	23–25	20–25	25–22	25–23	11–15	104–110	Report
27 Jan	21:00	SESC Flamengo (Rio de Janeiro (state))	3–0	(São Paulo (state)) Osasco SCS	25–21	25–17	25–22			75–60	Report
19 Fev	19:30	Maringá (Paraná (state))	1–3	(Minas Gerais) Minas	25–23	21–25	14–25	15–25		75–98	Report
20 Fev	18:30	Paulistano Barueri (São Paulo (state))	0–3	(Rio de Janeiro (state)) Fluminense	15–25	18–25	21–25			54–75	Report
20 Fev	19:00	Renasce Sorocaba (São Paulo (state))	3–2	(Rio de Janeiro (state)) Tijuca	25–23	20–25	25–17	15–25	15–12	100–102	Report
20 Fev	21:30	Mackenzie (Minas Gerais)	0–3	(Minas Gerais) Praia Clube	18–25	21–25	20–25			59–75	[ Report]

Round 19

Date	Time		Score		Set 1	Set 2	Set 3	Set 4	Set 5	Total	Report
5 Mar	18:30	Renasce Sorocaba (São Paulo (state))	–	(Federal District (Brazil)) Brasília Vôlei	–	–	–			0–0	[ Report]
5 Mar	18:30	Tijuca (Rio de Janeiro (state))	–	(Minas Gerais) Mackenzie	–	–	–			0–0	[ Report]
5 Mar	21:00	SESI Bauru (São Paulo (state))	–	(Paraná (state)) Maringá	–	–	–			0–0	[ Report]
6 Mar	18:30	Praia Clube (Minas Gerais)	–	(São Paulo (state)) Paulistano Barueri	–	–	–			0–0	[ Report]
6 Mar	19:00	Osasco (São Paulo (state))	–	(Rio de Janeiro (state)) Fluminense	–	–	–			0–0	[ Report]
6 Mar	21:30	Minas (Minas Gerais)	–	(Rio de Janeiro (state)) SESC Flamengo	–	–	–			0–0	[ Report]

Round 20

Date	Time		Score		Set 1	Set 2	Set 3	Set 4	Set 5	Total	Report
12 Mar	18:30	Mackenzie (Minas Gerais)	–	(Federal District (Brazil)) Brasília Vôlei	–	–	–			0–0	[ Report]
12 Mar	20:00	Minas (Minas Gerais)	–	(São Paulo (state)) Osasco SCS	–	–	–			0–0	[ Report]
12 Mar	21:00	Paulistano Barueri (São Paulo (state))	–	(Rio de Janeiro (state)) Tijuca	–	–	–			0–0	[ Report]
13 Mar	18:30	Maringá (Paraná (state))	–	(São Paulo (state)) Renasce Sorocaba	–	–	–			0–0	[ Report]
13 Mar	18:30	Praia Clube (Minas Gerais)	–	(Rio de Janeiro (state)) Fluminense	–	–	–			0–0	[ Report]
13 Mar	21:00	SESC Flamengo (Rio de Janeiro (state))	–	(São Paulo (state)) SESI Bauru	–	–	–			0–0	[ Report]

Round 21

Date	Time		Score		Set 1	Set 2	Set 3	Set 4	Set 5	Total	Report
19 Mar	18:30	Mackenzie (Minas Gerais)	–	(Paraná (state)) Maringá	–	–	–			0–0	[ Report]
19 Mar	18:30	Brasília Vôlei (Federal District (Brazil))	–	(São Paulo (state)) Paulistano Barueri	–	–	–			0–0	[ Report]
19 Mar	21:00	Renasce Sorocaba (São Paulo (state))	–	(Rio de Janeiro (state)) SESC Flamengo	–	–	–			0–0	[ Report]
20 Mar	18:30	Fluminense (Rio de Janeiro (state))	–	(Rio de Janeiro (state)) Tijuca	–	–	–			0–0	[ Report]
20 Mar	19:30	SESI Bauru (São Paulo (state))	–	(Minas Gerais) Minas	–	–	–			0–0	[ Report]
20 Mar	21:00	Osasco (São Paulo (state))	–	(Minas Gerais) Praia Clube	–	–	–			0–0	[ Report]

Round 22

Date	Time		Score		Set 1	Set 2	Set 3	Set 4	Set 5	Total	Report
24 Mar	21:00	SESC Flamengo (Rio de Janeiro (state))	–	(Minas Gerais) Mackenzie	–	–	–			0–0	[ Report]
24 Mar	21:00	Minas (Minas Gerais)	–	(São Paulo (state)) Renasce Sorocaba	–	–	–			0–0	[ Report]
24 Mar	21:00	Fluminense (Rio de Janeiro (state))	–	(Federal District (Brazil)) Brasília Vôlei	–	–	–			0–0	[ Report]
24 Mar	21:00	Osasco (São Paulo (state))	–	(São Paulo (state)) SESI Bauru	–	–	–			0–0	[ Report]
24 Mar	21:00	Praia Clube (Minas Gerais)	–	(Rio de Janeiro (state)) Tijuca	–	–	–			0–0	[ Report]
24 Mar	21:00	Paulistano Barueri (Paraná (state))	–	(Paraná (state)) Maringá	–	–	–			0–0	[ Report]

== Championship playoffs ==
- All times are local, BRT (UTC−03:00).

=== Bracket ===
Quarterfinals
1
8
4
5
2
7
3
6

Semifinals

Finals

=== Quarterfinals ===
==== (1) vs. (8) ====
Date	Time	Score	Set 1	Set 2	Set 3	Set 4	Set 5	Total	Report
		0–0	–	–	–			0–0	
		0–0	–	–	–			0–0	

==== (2) vs. (7) ====
Date	Time	Score	Set 1	Set 2	Set 3	Set 4	Set 5	Total	Report
		0–0	–	–	–			0–0	
		0–0	–	–	–			0–0	

==== (3) vs. (6) ====
Date	Time	Score	Set 1	Set 2	Set 3	Set 4	Set 5	Total	Report
		0–0	–	–	–			0–0	
		0–0	–	–	–			0–0	

==== (4) vs. (5) ====
Date	Time	Score	Set 1	Set 2	Set 3	Set 4	Set 5	Total	Report
		0–0	–	–	–			0–0	
		0–0	–	–	–			0–0	

=== Semifinals ===
Date	Time	Score	Set 1	Set 2	Set 3	Set 4	Set 5	Total	Report
		0–0	–	–	–			0–0	
		0–0	–	–	–			0–0	

Date	Time	Score	Set 1	Set 2	Set 3	Set 4	Set 5	Total	Report
		0–0	–	–	–			0–0	
		0–0	–	–	–			0–0	

=== Finals ===
Date	Time	Score	Set 1	Set 2	Set 3	Set 4	Set 5	Total	Report
3 May		0–0	–	–	–			0–0	

== Final classification ==
1st place, gold medalist(s)
2nd place, silver medalist(s)
3rd place, bronze medalist(s)
4
5
6
7
8
9
10
11
12

2025–26 Brazilian champions
