= Minas Gerais Volleyball Championship =

Brazilian volleyball competition

Campeonato Mineiro de Voleibol
- Upcoming season or competition: 2014
- Sport: Volleyball
- Founded: 1934
- First season: 1934
- Owner: Minas Gerais Volleyball Federation (FMV)
- President: Carlos Antônio Rios
- No. of teams: M: 4 F:5
- Country: Brazil
- Most recent champions: M: Sada Cruzeiro (2015); F: Praia Clube (2014)
- Most titles: M: Minas (20); F: Mackenzie (12)
- Website: http://fmvolei.org.br/

The Minas Gerais Volleyball Championship (Portuguese: Campeonato Mineiro de Voleibol) is the top level men's and women's volleyball competition in Minas Gerais, Brazil. The first edition happened in 1934 and it has been disputed yearly, with some interruptions. The tournament was initially organized by the Minas Gerais Association of General Sports (AMEG) (Portuguese: Associação Mineira de Esportes Gerais). The Minas Gerais Volleyball Federation was founded in 1942, and has organized all editions since then.

The format and number of participating clubs has varied along the years, and differ between the men's and women's tournament. Though the championship concerns to volleyball teams from Minas Gerais, eventually teams from other states have competed. The 2014 edition has four participants on the men's competition and five on the women's competition. The current version is considered to be a preparation event for the Brazilian Men's and Women's Superleagues.

== Men's tournament ==
=== Results by Year ===
Year	Champion	Runners-up
1934	Clube Marcos Lisboa	ASA
1935	Not disputed
1936	ASA	Unknown
1937	Glória E. C.	Unknown
1938	Glória E. C.	Unknown
1939	E. C. Payssandu	Unknown
1940 to 1942	Not disputed
1943	Atlético Mineiro	Unknown
1944	Atlético Mineiro	Unknown
1945	Olympico	Unknown
1946 to 1947	Not disputed
1948	Atlético Mineiro	Unknown
1949	Atlético Mineiro	Unknown
1950	Atlético Mineiro	Unknown
1951	Atlético Mineiro	Unknown
1952	Atlético Mineiro	Unknown
1953	Atlético Mineiro	Olympico
1954 to 1969	Not disputed
1970	Minas Tênis Clube	Unknown
1971	Minas Tênis Clube	Unknown
1972	Minas Tênis Clube	Unknown
1973	Minas Tênis Clube	Unknown
1974	Sport Club Juiz de Fora	Unknown
1976	Minas Tênis Clube	Unknown
1977	Minas Tênis Clube	Unknown
1978	Minas Tênis Clube	Unknown
1979	Minas Tênis Clube	Unknown
1980	Atlético Mineiro	Unknown
1981	Atlético Mineiro	Unknown
1982	Pequeno Mineiro	Unknown
1983	Atlético Mineiro	Unknown
1984	Minas Tênis Clube	Unknown
1985	Minas Tênis Clube	Unknown
1986 to 1997	Not disputed
1998	Minas Tênis Clube	Unknown
1999	Minas Tênis Clube	Unknown
2000	Minas Tênis Clube	Unknown
2001	Minas Tênis Clube	Unknown
2002	Minas Tênis Clube	Unknown
2003	Minas Tênis Clube	Unknown
2004	Minas Tênis Clube	Unknown
2005	Minas Tênis Clube	Unknown
2006	Minas Tênis Clube	Sada Betim
2007	Minas Tênis Clube	Tigre Unisul
2008	Sada Betim	Minas Tênis Clube
2009	Montes Claros	Minas Tênis Clube
2010	Sada Cruzeiro	Minas Tênis Clube
2011	Sada Cruzeiro	Minas Tênis Clube
2012	Sada Cruzeiro	Minas Tênis Clube
2013	Sada Cruzeiro	Minas Tênis Clube
2014	Sada Cruzeiro	Minas Tênis Clube
2015	Sada Cruzeiro	Minas Tênis Clube

=== Titles per Team ===
Club	Winners	Runners-up
Minas Tênis Clube	20	8
Atlético Mineiro	12	0
Sada Cruzeiro	11	1
Glória E.C.	2	0
Montes Claros	1	0
ASA	1	1
Olympico	1	1
Clube Marcos Lisboa	1	0
E.C. Payssandu	1	0
Sport Club	1	0
Tigre Unisul	0	1

== Women's tournament ==
=== Results by Year ===
Year	Champion	Runners-up
1934	ASA	Academia Fischer
1935	Not disputed
1936	Academia Fischer	Unknown
1937	Florentino Clube	Unknown
1938 to 1939	Not disputed
1940	Minas T.C.	Atlético Mineiro
1941 to 1945	Not disputed
1946	Minas T.C.	Atlético Mineiro
1947 to 1948	Not disputed
1949	Minas T.C.	Unknown
1950	Unknown	Unknown
1951	Unknown	Unknown
1952	Mackenzie	Unknown
1953	Mackenzie	Montes Claros
1954	Mackenzie.	Unknown
1955	Mackenzie	Unknown
1956	Mackenzie	Unknown
1957	Mackenzie	Unknown
1958	Unknown	Unknown
1959	Atlético Mineiro	Unknown
1960	Atlético Mineiro	Unknown
1961 a 1971	Unknown	Unknown
1972	Mackenzie	Unknown
1973	Mackenzie	Unknown
1974	Mackenzie	Unknown
1975	Mackenzie	Unknown
1976	Mackenzie	Unknown
1977	Mackenzie	Unknown
1978	Mackenzie	Unknown
1978 a 1985	Unknown	Unknown
1986 to 1997	Not disputed
1998 a 2000	Unknown	Unknown
2001	Unknown	Unknown
2002	Unknown	Unknown
2003	Minas T.C.	Unknown
2004 to 2005	Not disputed
2006	Praia Clube	PM de Betim
2007	Not disputed
2008	Mackenzie	Sada Betim
2009	Not disputed
2010	Mackenzie	Minas T.C.
2011	Praia Clube	Mackenzie
2012	Praia Clube	Unknown
2013	Praia Clube	Minas T.C.
2014	Praia Clube	Minas T.C.
2015	Praia Clube	Minas T.C.
2016	Not disputed
2017	Minas T.C.	Praia Clube
2020	Minas T.C.

=== Titles per Team ===
Club	Winners	Runners-up
Mackenzie Esporte Clube	15	1
Minas T.C.	4	4
Praia Clube	6	0
Atlético Mineiro	2	2
Academia Fischer	1	1
ASA	1	0
Florentino Clube	1	0
Montes Claros	0	1
Sada Betim	0	1
PM de Betim	0	1
