= Andressa Picussa =

Brazilian volleyball player (born 1989)

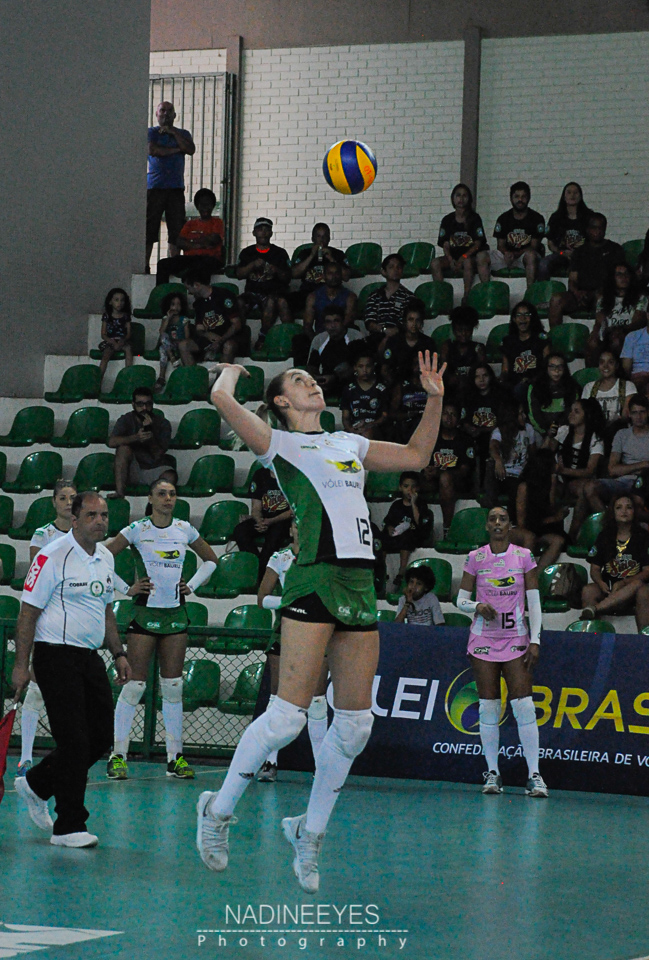

Personal information
- Full name: Andressa Hermínia Gelenski Picussa
- Born: 22 July 1989 (age 37); Curitiba, Brazil
- Height: 1.92 cm (1 in)
- Weight: 82 kg (181 lb)
- Spike: 303 cm (119 in)
- Block: 293 cm (115 in)

Volleyball information
- Position: Middle blocker

National team
2012	Brazil
Honours
Women's volleyball
Representing Brazil
Pan-American Cup
Silver medal – second place	2012 Mexico	Team

Andressa Picussa (born 22 July 1989) is a Brazilian female volleyball player. She was part of the Brazil women's national volleyball team. Her hometown is Rio de Janeiro.

She participated in the 2012 FIVB Volleyball World Grand Prix. She plays for the Minas Tênis Clube.

== Clubs ==
- (Brazil) Minas Tênis Clube (2007–2009)
- (Brazil) Mackenzie EC (2009–2010)
- (Brazil) Vôlei Futuro (2010–2012)
- (Brazil) Vôlei Amil-Campinas (2012–2013)
- (Turkey) Eczacıbaşı VitrA (2013–2014)
- (Azerbaijan) Azeryol Baku (2014–2015)
- (Brazil) São Caetano (2015–2017)
- (Brazil) Vôlei Bauru (2017–)
