= Olympico Club (Belo Horizonte) =

Brazilian volleyball clubs

- Founded: February 4, 1940; 86 years ago
- Founder: Roberto de M. Pinto; João C. Fernandes Filho; Renato de M. Pinto; Rogério de M. Pinto; Mauro Ferreira; Antônio C. R. Garcia; Alberto S. Teixeira; Luciano Passini; Camil Caram; Gil Guatimosim Júnior; José Vieira
- Type: Traditional club
- Location: Belo Horizonte, Brazil
- Key people: Luiz Carlos Bemfica Cotta Santos (president)
- Website: Official Website

Olympico Club (short, just Olympico) is a social, recreational and sports club from Belo Horizonte, Brazil. The club was established in 1940, being the second recreational club in Belo Horizonte, after Minas Tênis Clube. The club has long tradition in the formation of young athletes. Olympico's men's volleyball club plays in the Brazilian Men's Volleyball Superliga - B, the second-tier of Brazilian volleyball, being this the only professional team that the club maintains.
