= São Caetano Esporte Clube =

Women's volleyball team in Brazil

- League: Superliga Feminina
- Based in: São Caetano
- Head coach: Jailson de Andrade

São Caetano is a professional women's volleyball team, based in São Caetano do Sul, São Paulo, Brazil, competing in the Superliga Feminina.

== Current squad ==
Name	Height	Position
Gabriella Pena	176	Middle-Blocker
Talia Costa	178	Wing-Spiker
Sabrina Machado	183	Wing-Spiker
Fernanda Tomé	194	Wing-Spiker
Lyara Medeiros	178	Setter
Emilce Sosa	177	Middle-Blocker
Andressa Krachefski	172	Libero
Ana Flavia Galvão	182	Setter
Camila Monteiro	189	Middle-Blocker
Sonaly Cidrão	181	Wing-Spiker
Nayra Lima	174	Opposite
Paulina Souza	170	Libero
Kisy Nascimento	189	Opposite

2016–2017 Team
Name	Height	Position
Nikolle Del Rei Aid Correa	180	Wing-Spiker
Victoria Alvez Pinto	181	Wing-Spiker
Glauciele Martins da Silva	188	Wing-Spiker
Angelica da Penha Correa Caboclo	180	Opposite
Stefany Grecco da Silva	180	Wing-Spiker
Edinara Brancher	184	Wing-Spiker
Carolina Dias Godoi	189	Middle-Blocker
Fernanda Tomé	194	Wing-Spiker
Andressa Picussa	192	Middle-Blocker
Erika Schiersner	170	Libero
Paula Mohr	187	Wing-Spiker
Camila Caroline Miranda Silva	176	Setter
Diana Xavier	178	Setter
Marjorie Correa	185	Middle-Blocker
Ana Flavia da Mata Galvão	184	Setter
Laísa Gomes Chekini Miguel	182	Middle-Blocker

2008–2009 Team
Name	Height	Position
Hélia Souza	177	Setter
Ana Cristina	174	Setter
Camila	181	Setter
Marianne Steinbrecher	187	Wing-Spiker
Luciana	175	Wing-Spiker
Clarisse	180	Wing-Spiker
Thais	190	Wing-Spiker
Andréia Laurence	185	Middle-Blocker
Edna Schlindwein	187	Middle-Blocker
Barbara	181	Middle-Blocker
Natasha	196	Middle-Blocker
Dani	186	Opposite
Sheilla Castro	180	Opposite
Suelen	165	Libero

== Football honours ==
- Campeonato Paulista Série A2
  - Winner (2): 1928, 1940
