= Mackenzie Esporte Clube =

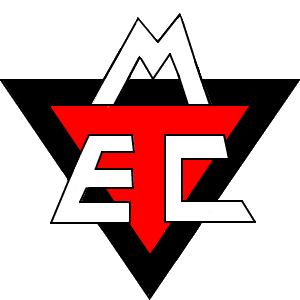
- Crest of Mackenzie Esporte Clube
- Type: Traditional club
- Founded: September 1, 1943; 83 years ago
- Headquarters: Belo Horizonte, Brazil
- Key people: Daniel Teodoro Santos Teixeira (president)
- Website: Official Website

Mackenzie Esporte Clube (short, just Mackenzie) is a social, recreational and sports club from Belo Horizonte, Brazil. The club has tradition in forming new athletes, especially in women's volleyball. The most prominent athletes that started in the club are the two-times Olympic champion Sheilla Castro, and the Olympic bronze-medal winners Ana Paula Connelly and Érika Coimbra.

Mackenzie holds the record of 15 Minas Gerais Women's Volleyball Championships. The club maintained a professional team in the Brazilian Women's Volleyball Superleague between the seasons 2007–08 and 2011–12. The club returned with the professional women's volleyball team in 2024, when it won the 2024/25 Brazilian Volleyballl Superleage - Serie B (second tier), and thus since being promoted to the Brazilian Volleyball Super League (top tier).

== Women's Volleyball ==
=== Initial Years and Team Creation ===
Volleyball is played in Mackenzie since its inception.

=== 1950-1959 ===
Mackenzie riled the volleyball in Minas Gerais in 50's, when the team won 7 state titles in a row, between the years 1952 and 1957. Also, the team won the city championship six times in a row. The main players in this period were Juraci Raso, Zezé. Miriam, Oraida, Mirtes, Zuzu, Margot, Josefina, Estela, Laís Turner and Lia de Freitas. The managers in the period were Hélcio Nunan and Mário Lopes. That was the beginning of the rivalry with Minas Tênis Clube. Both are located in the same neighborhood, and ruled the local Women's volleyball scene, jointly with Clube Atlético Mineiro.

=== 1960-1969 ===
In 1963 the club won its most important title: the Brazil Championship of Champion Clubs. The tournament was held in Juiz de Fora, and the other teams where Pinheiros (SP), Fluminense (RJ), e América (CE). The Mackenzie team was Lia de Freitas, Silene, Íris, Necy, Hilda, Leonésia, Carminha, Neusinha, Lúcia, Jacira e Rosinha. Betinho was the manager.

=== 2000-present days ===
The club kept a professional Women's volleyball team in the Brazilian Superleague from the season 2007/2008 to 2011/2012. Its best campaign was in the season 2008/2009, when it finished in the 6th position. The team withdraw from disputing the Superleague 2012/2013 due to lack of sponsorship.

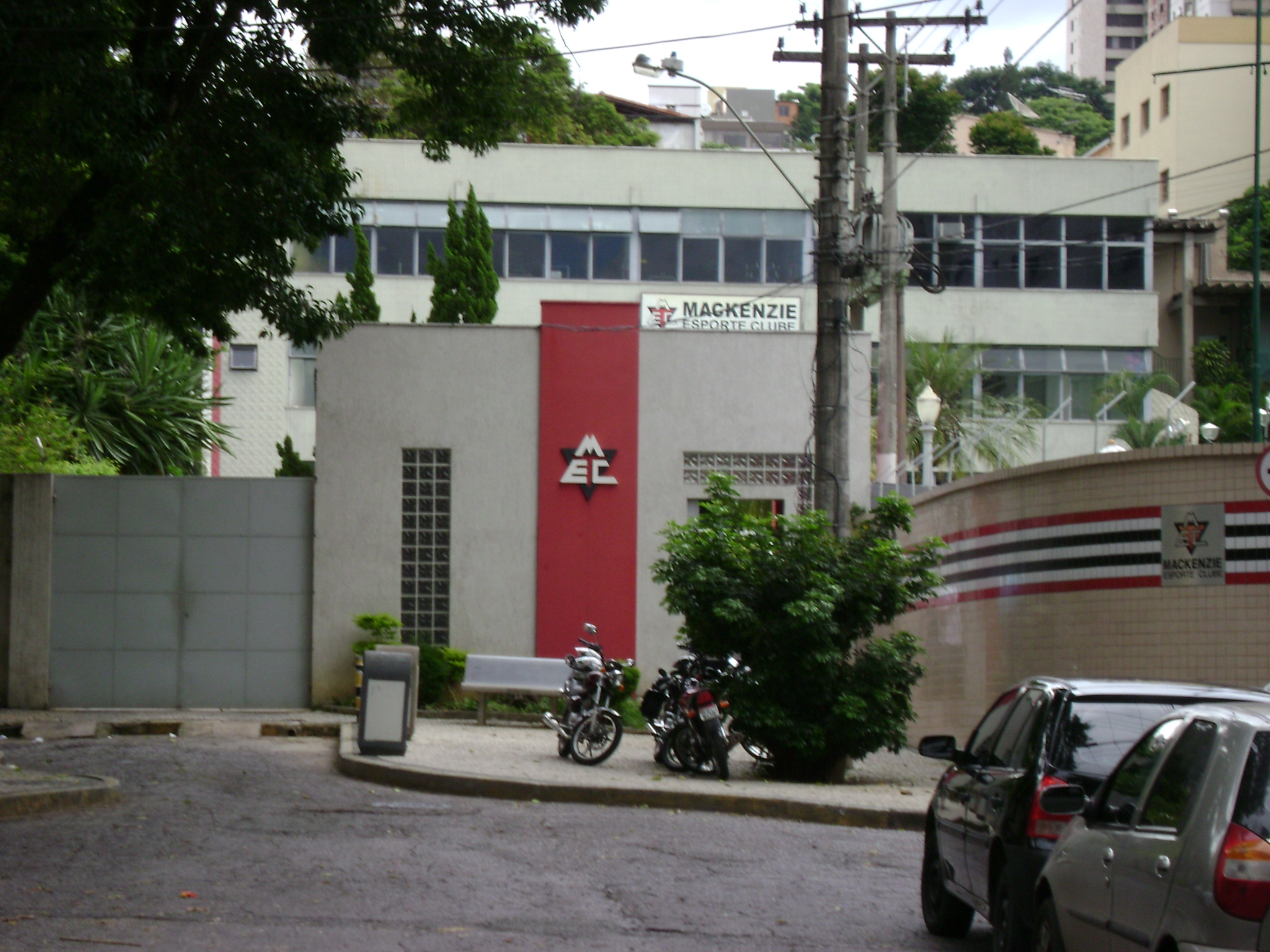
Main entrance to Mackenzie Esporte Clube.

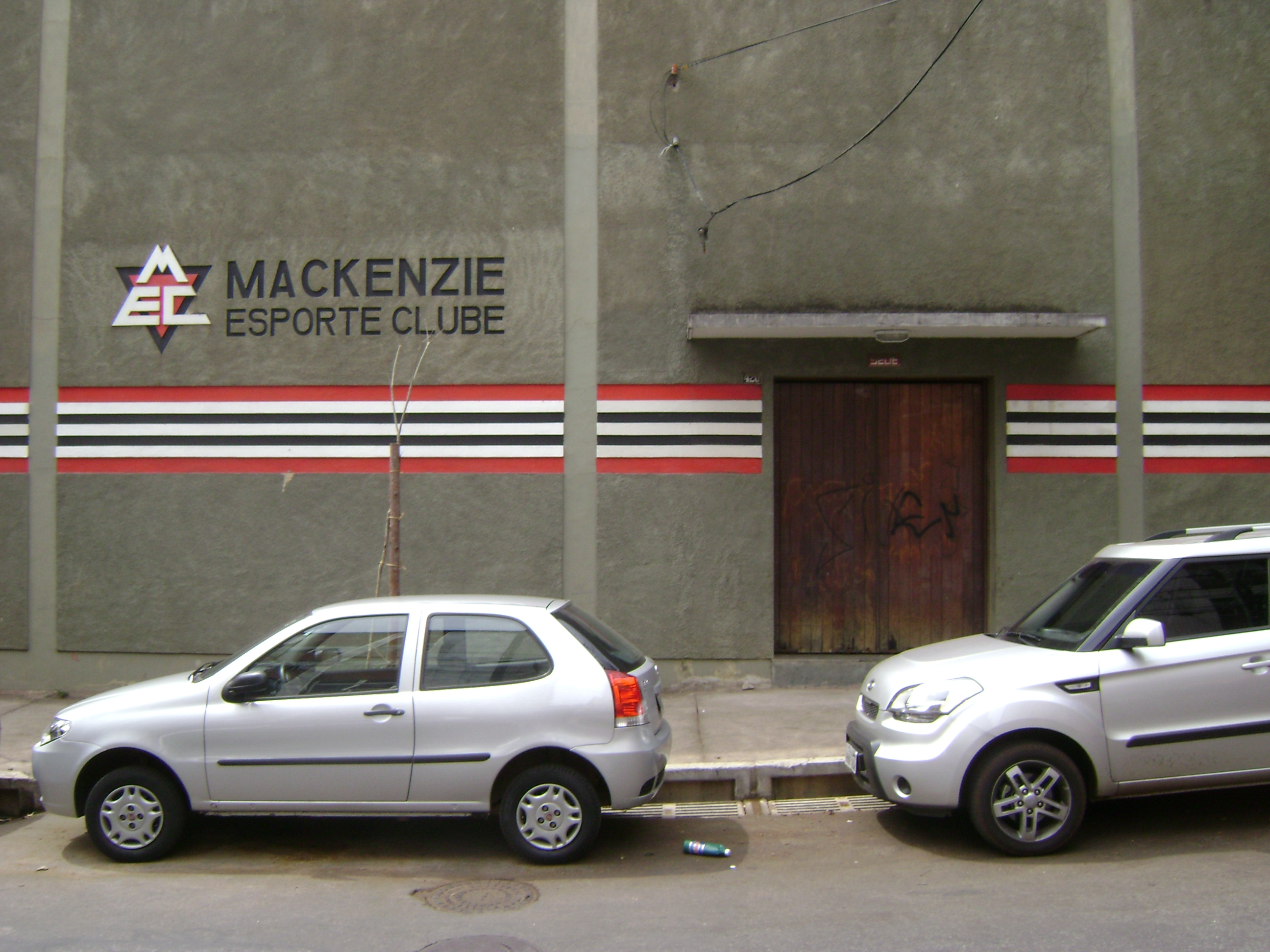
Side entrance to Mackenzie Esporte Clube, em Belo Horizonte.

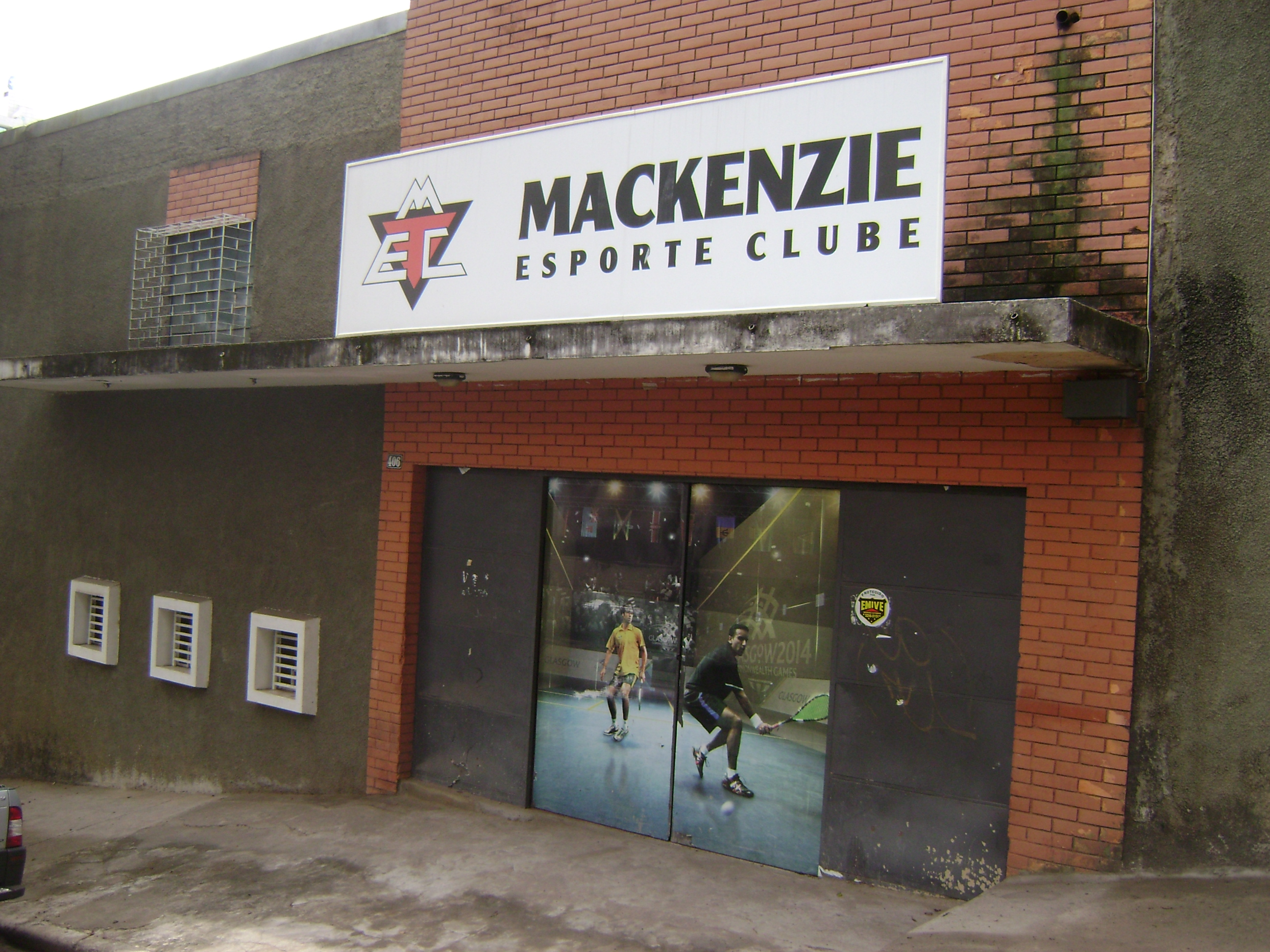
Entrance to the gymnasium Mackenzie Esporte Clube.
