= Tifanny Abreu =

Brazilian volleyball player (born 1984)

Personal information
- Born: Tifanny Pereira de Abreu; October 29, 1984 (age 41)
- Hometown: Goiás, Brazil
- Height: 1.94 m (6 ft 4 in)
- Weight: 84 kg (185 lb)

Tifanny Abreu (born October 29, 1984) is a Brazilian volleyball player. She was the first trans woman to play in the Brazilian Women's Volleyball Superliga.

Before playing in women's championships, she competed as a man for Superliga A and B in Brazil, and other championships in the leagues of Indonesia, Portugal, Spain, France, the Netherlands and Belgium. While in JTV Dero Zele-Berlare, Abreu decided to complete her gender transition. In 2017, she received permission from the International Volleyball Federation to compete in women's leagues.

In 2018, Abreu ran as a candidate for the Brazilian Democratic Movement Party.

In June 2020, in honor of the 50th anniversary of the first LGBTQ Pride parade, Queerty named her among the fifty heroes "leading the nation toward equality, acceptance, and dignity for all people".

== Clubs ==
Period	Club	Country	Ref.
2008-09	Esmoriz	Portugal	
2014	JTV Dero Zele-Berlare	Belgium	
2017	Golem Palmi	Italy	
2017-	Vôlei Bauru	Brazil	

== Personal life ==
She is currently married to football player Victor Emmanoel Metz.
