= Associação Vôlei Bauru =

Brazilian volleyball club

Vôlei Bauru
- Full name: Associação Vôlei Bauru
- Founded: 2005
- Ground: Panela de Pressão, Bauru
- Manager: Reinaldo Mandaliti
- League: Brazilian Superliga
- 2018–19: 4th
- Website: Club home page

Sesi Vôlei Bauru is a women's volleyball team, based in Bauru, São Paulo (state), Brazil.

== Team ==
Season 2021-2022' squad - As of December 2021

- Head coach: (Brazil) Rubinho Leonaldo

Team roster - season 2021–2022
Number	Player	Position	Height (m)	Birth date
1	(Brazil) Mara Leão	Middle Blocker	1.90	June 26, 1991 (age 33)
3	(Brazil) Danielle Lins	Setter	1.84	January 5, 1985 (age 40)
4	(Brazil) Suelle Oliveira	Outside Hitter	1.86	April 29, 1987 (age 37)
5	(Brazil) Adenízia da Silva	Middle Blocker	1.87	December 18, 1986 (age 38)
6	(Brazil) Nyeme Costa	Libero	1.75	October 11, 1998 (age 26)
7	(Brazil) Pamela Sanabio	Opposite	1.85	July 19, 1999 (age 25)
8	(Brazil) Letícia de Lima Linhares	Setter	1.75	September 25, 1997 (age 27)
9	(Brazil) Mayhara Silva	Middle Blocker	1.84	September 4, 1989 (age 35)
11	(Brazil) Leticia Hemelly Gomes	Libero	1.62	February 29, 1996 (age 29)
12	(Brazil) Gabriela Santin	Libero	1.74	November 17, 2002 (age 22)
13	(Brazil) Sabrina Groth	Outside Hitter	1.80	July 7, 2000 (age 24)
14	(United States) Nia Reed	Opposite	1.84	June 27, 1996 (age 28)
16	(Brazil) Ivna Marra	Opposite	1.85	January 25, 1990 (age 35)
17	(Brazil) Drussyla Costa	Outside Hitter	1.82	July 1, 1996 (age 28)
18	(Brazil) Mayany de Souza	Middle blocker	1.85	November 24, 1996 (age 28)
20	(Brazil) Thaís de Souza	Outside Hitter	1.74	April 18, 1988 (age 36)

Team roster - season 2020–2021
Number	Player	Position	Height (m)	Birth date
1	(Brazil) Mara Leão	Middle Blocker	1.90	June 26, 1991 (age 33)
2	(Brazil) Maria Luiza Elói	Opposite	1.84	September 20, 2002 (age 22)
3	(Brazil) Danielle Lins	Setter	1.84	January 5, 1985 (age 40)
4	(Brazil) Carolina Leite	Setter	1.73	November 15, 1992 (age 32)
5	(Brazil) Adenízia da Silva	Middle Blocker	1.87	December 18, 1986 (age 38)
6	(Brazil) Kátia Larissa da Silva	Middle Blocker	1.84	October 4, 2002 (age 22)
6	(Brazil) Pamela Sanabio	Opposite	1.85	July 19, 1999 (age 25)
8	(Brazil) Júlia Dias	Libero	1.57	June 8, 1998 (age 26)
9	(Brazil) Mayhara Silva	Middle Blocker	1.84	September 4, 1989 (age 35)
10	(Brazil) Tifanny Abreu	Outside Hitter	1.93	August 19, 1984 (age 40)
11	(Brazil) Zanandrya Ribeiro	Outside Hitter	1.84	January 20, 2003 (age 22)
12	(Brazil) Gabriela Santin	Libero	1.72	November 17, 2002 (age 22)
14	(Brazil) Laura Cristina Müller	Middle Blocker	1.81	March 31, 2002 (age 22)
15	(Dominican Republic) Brenda Castillo	Libero	1.68	June 5, 1992 (age 32)
16	(Brazil) Vanessa Janke	Outside Hitter	1.84	March 8, 1991 (age 34)
17	(Azerbaijan) Polina Rahimova	Opposite	1.98	June 5, 1990 (age 34)
18	(Brazil) Suelle Oliveira	Outside Hitter	1.86	April 29, 1987 (age 37)
19	(Brazil) Fernanda Ísis da Silva	Middle Blocker	1.87	April 9, 1989 (age 35)
20	(Brazil) Mariana Cassemiro	Outside Hitter	1.83	March 27, 1987 (age 37)

Team roster - season 2019–2020
Number	Player	Position	Height (m)	Birth date
1	(Brazil) Iarla Cossul	Setter	1.65	April 9, 1999 (age 25)
2	(Brazil) Naiane Rios	Setter	1.80	November 28, 1994 (age 30)
3	(Brazil) Danielle Lins	Setter	1.84	January 5, 1985 (age 40)
4	(Brazil) Lara Souza	Middle blocker	1.92	July 12, 1999 (age 25)
5	(Brazil) Glayce Vasconcelos	Outside hitter	1.85	January 28, 1998 (age 27)
6	(Brazil) Gabriela Candido	Outiside Hitter	1.81	May 22, 1996 (age 28)
8	(Brazil) Júlia Dias	Libero	1.57	June 8, 1998 (age 26)
9	(Brazil) Mayhara Silva	Middle Blocker	1.84	September 4, 1989 (age 35)
10	(Brazil) Tifanny Abreu	Outside Hitter	1.93	August 19, 1984 (age 40)
11	(Brazil) Valquiria Dullius	Middle Blocker	1.90	August 19, 1994 (age 30)
12	(Brazil) Andressa Picussa	Middle Blocker	1.92	July 22, 1989 (age 35)
13	(United States) Sarah Wilhite	Outside Hitter	1.85	July 30, 1996 (age 28)
15	(Brazil) Kimberlly Brito	Opposite	1.91	November 9, 1999 (age 25)
17	(Azerbaijan) Polina Rahimova	Opposite	1.98	June 5, 1990 (age 34)
19	(Brazil) Tássia Silva	Libero	1.74	June 3, 1988 (age 36)

Team roster - season 2018–2019
Number	Player	Position	Height (m)	Birth date
1	(Brazil) Iarla Cossul	Setter	1.65	April 9, 1999 (age 25)
3	(Brazil) Naiane Rios	Setter	1.80	November 28, 1994 (age 30)
5	(Brazil) Glayce Vasconcelos	Outside hitter	1.85	January 28, 1998 (age 27)
6	(Brazil) Gabriela Candido	Outiside Hitter	1.81	May 22, 1996 (age 28)
7	(Brazil) Saraelen Lima	Middle Blocker	1.84	April 16, 1994 (age 30)
9	(Brazil) Edinara Brancher	Opposite	1.84	February 1, 1996 (age 29)
10	(Brazil) Tiffany Abreu	Outside Hitter	1.93	August 19, 1984 (age 40)
11	(Brazil) Valquiria Dullius	Middle Blocker	1.90	August 19, 1994 (age 30)
12	(Brazil) Andressa Picussa	Middle Blocker	1.92	July 22, 1989 (age 35)
13	(Italy) Valentina Diouf	Opposite	2.02	January 10, 1993 (age 32)
14	(Brazil) Fabíola de Souza	Setter	1.84	February 3, 1983 (age 42)
15	(Brazil) Kimberlly Brito	Opposite	1.91	November 9, 1999 (age 25)
16	(Brazil) Vanessa Janke	Outside Hitter	1.84	March 8, 1991 (age 34)
17	(Brazil) Júlia Dias	Libero	1.57	June 8, 1998 (age 26)
18	(Cuba) Yoana Palacio	Outside Hitter	1.84	October 6, 1990 (age 34)
19	(Brazil) Tássia Silva	Libero	1.74	June 3, 1988 (age 36)
20	(Brazil) Arlene Xavier	Libero	1.78	December 20, 1969 (age 55)

== Titles ==
- Brazilian Cup:
  - Champions (1): 2022
- Paulista Championship:
  - Champions (1): 2018
