= Niverka Marte =

Dominican Republic volleyball player

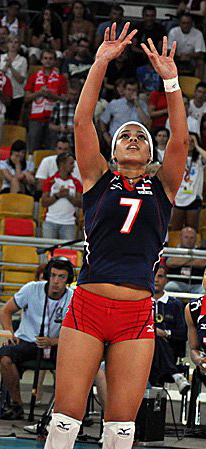
- Niverka Marte in 2011

Personal information
- Full name: Niverka Dharlenis Marte Frica
- Nickname: Nive
- Nationality: Dominican
- Born: October 19, 1990 (age 36); Santo Domingo
- Hometown: Santo Domingo
- Height: 1.78 m (5 ft 10 in)
- Weight: 67 kg (148 lb)
- Spike: 312 cm (123 in)
- Block: 300 cm (118 in)

Volleyball information
- Position: Setter
- Current club: AEK Athens
- Number: 77

National team
2008 -	Dominican Republic
Honours
Women's volleyball
Representing the Dominican Republic
Pan American Games
Gold medal – first place	2019 Lima	Team
Gold medal – first place	2023 Santiago	Team
Bronze medal – third place	2015 Toronto	Team
World Grand Champions Cup
Bronze medal – third place	2009 Tokyo/Fukuoka	Team
U20 World Championship
Silver medal – second place	2009 Mexicali/Tijuana	Team
Pan-American Cup
Gold medal – first place	2008 Mexicali/Tijuana	Team
Gold medal – first place	2010 Rosarito/Tijuana	Team
Gold medal – first place	2014 Mexico City	Team
Gold medal – first place	2016 Santo Domingo	Team
Gold medal – first place	2022 Hermosillo	Team
Silver medal – second place	2009 Miami	Team
Silver medal – second place	2011 Ciudad Juárez	Team
Silver medal – second place	2013 Lima	Team
Silver medal – second place	2015 Lima/Callao	Team
Silver medal – second place	2017 Cañete/Lima	Team
Silver medal – second place	2018 Santo Domingo	Team
NORCECA Championship
Gold medal – first place	2009 Bayamón	Team
Silver medal – second place	2011 Caguas	Team
Silver medal – second place	2013 Omaha	Team
Final Four Cup
Gold medal – first place	2010 Chiapas	Team
Silver medal – second place	2008 Fortaleza	Team
Bronze medal – third place	2009 Lima	Team
Central American and Caribbean Games
Gold medal – first place	2010 Mayagüez	Team
Gold medal – first place	2014 Veracruz	Team
Gold medal – first place	2026 Santo Domingo	Team
U23 Pan-American Cup
Gold medal – first place	2012 Callao	Team
- Last updated: September 2015

Niverka Dharlenis Marte Frica (born October 19, 1990, in Santo Domingo) is a volleyball player from the Dominican Republic who currently plays for Greek side AEK Athens. She played the 2012 Summer Olympics with the Dominican Republic national team ranking in fifth place. She also played the 2010 and the 2014 World Championship earning the 17th place and the fifth place and the 2011 and the 2015 FIVB World Cup with her national team ranking in the eight and seventh place. She won the bronze medal in the 2015 Pan American Games.

With her Junior national team, she took the silver at the 2009 World Championship.

== Career ==
During the 2006 season, she played in La Romana with Aviación and with Mirador at Distrito Nacional Superior Championship, winning her team the league championship.

Niverka played for her native country at the 2007 FIVB Girls' U18 Volleyball World Championship in Baja California, Mexico. There her team ended up in 8th place.

In 2008, she participated at the NORCECA Women´s Junior Continental Championship U-20 as team captain, winning with her them the silver medal and individually, the "Best Setter" award. Shortly afterwards she claimed the gold medal at the 2008 Women's Pan-American Volleyball Cup in Mexico, with the senior national team.

With the National Junior Team she won the silver medal at the 2009 Women's U20 Volleyball World Championship.

Playing beach volleyball (three) with Ana Yorkira Binet and Marianne Fersola, she won the gold medal at the 2010 Hato Mayor Beach Volleyball Tournament.

As a setter, she helped the National Senior Team playing in Chiapas, Mexico, to win the 2010 Final Four Cup gold medal.

Marte returned to Hato Mayor to win the gold medal in the annual Sport Festival in Beach Volleyball (three), this time playing along Altagracia Mambrú and Ana Yorkira Binet.

In 2012, Marte played on Olympic Games, where Dominican Republic qualified to quarter-final.

In September 2012, Marte won the gold medal at the first 2012 U23 Pan-American Cup, played in Callao, Peru.

Marte was transferred to the Azerbaijani Club Igtisadchi Baku in early November. With this club, she claimed the silver medal of the 2012/13 Azerbaijani Super League.

During the 2014 World Championship held in Italy, Marte helped the national team to reach the competition's fifth place starting with 7–2 record, and despite the losing 2–3 to China, her team qualified for the first time to the World Championship third round besides but being unable to reach a semifinal spot after losing their two third round matches 2–3 to China and 0–3 to Brazil.

Marte and her national team took part of the 2014 Central American and Caribbean Games. and she helped them to win their fourth consecutive gold medal, being awarded Best Setter of the tournament.

Marte was part of the Dominican Republic delegation to the 2015 Pan American Games, and she won with her national team the bronze medal after losing to the United States in the semifinals and defeated 3-1 the Puerto Rico national team. After leading the setters during the 2015 FIVB World Cup she was awarded tournament's Best Setter while her national team posted a 5–6 record, valid for the seventh place. After the World Cup, she was announced to be transferred to the French club Rocheville Le Cannet taking the role of the main setter for the 2015–16 season. Castillo won the silver medal and the Best Setter award in the NORCECA Championship. In December 2015, Marte won with her club the French Supercup, defeating RC Cannes 3–2 in the championship match.

Marte helped her national team to win the gold medal at the 2026 Central American and Caribbean Games, the seventh consecutive for her home country. She was awarded tournament's Best Setter.

== Clubs ==
- (Dominican Republic) Deportivo Nacional (2004)
- (Dominican Republic) Modeca (2005)
- (Dominican Republic) Mirador (2006)
- (Dominican Republic) Aviación (2006)
- (Dominican Republic) Deportivo Nacional (2007–2008)
- (Dominican Republic) Distrito Nacional (2007–2010)
- (Dominican Republic) Mirador (2010)
- (Azerbaijan) Igtisadchi Baku (2012–2013)
- (Dominican Republic) Mirador (2015)
- (France) Rocheville Le Cannet (2015–2016)
- (Peru) Geminis de Comas (2018–2019)
- (Indonesia) Jakarta Pertamina Energi (2022)
- (Indonesia) Jakarta Popsivo Polwan (2023)
- (Greece) AEK Athens (2025–present)

== Awards ==
=== Individuals ===
- 2008 NORCECA Junior Continental Championship U-20 "Best Setter"
- 2014 Central American and Caribbean Games "Best Setter"
- 2015 FIVB World Cup "Best Setter"
- 2015 NORCECA Championship "Best Setter"
- 2022 Pan-American Cup "Most Valuable Player"
- 2026 Central American and Caribbean Games "Best Setter"

=== National team ===
==== Senior team ====
- 2008 Pan-American Cup - Gold Medal
- 2008 Final Four Women's Cup - Silver Medal
- 2009 FIVB World Grand Champions Cup - Bronze Medal
- 2009 NORCECA Championship - Gold Medal
- 2009 Pan-American Cup - Silver Medal
- 2009 Final Four Women's Cup - Bronze Medal
- 2010 Final Four Women's Cup - Gold Medal
- 2010 Central American and Caribbean Games - Gold Medal
- 2010 Pan-American Cup - Gold Medal
- 2011 Pan-American Cup - Silver Medal
- 2011 NORCECA Championship - Silver Medal
- 2012 U23 Pan-American Cup - Gold Medal
- 2013 Pan-American Cup - Silver Medal
- 2013 NORCECA Championship - Silver Medal
- 2014 Pan-American Cup - Gold Medal
- 2014 Central American and Caribbean Games - Gold Medal
- 2015 Pan-American Cup - Silver Medal
- 2015 Pan American Games - Bronze Medal

==== Junior team ====
- 2006 NORCECA Girls Youth Continental Championship U-18 Silver Medal
- 2008 NORCECA Women´s Junior Continental Championship U-20 Silver Medal
- 2009 FIVB U20 Volleyball World Championship Silver Medal

=== Clubs ===
- 2006 Dominican Republic Distrito Nacional Superior Tournament 2006 - Champion, with Mirador
- 2007 & 2008 Dominican Republic Volleyball League - Champion, with Distrito Nacional
- 2012-13 Azerbaijan Super League - Runner-Up, with Igtisadchi Baku
- 2015 French Supercup - Champion, with Rocheville Le Cannet

=== Beach Volleyball ===
- 2010 Hato Mayor Beach Volleyball Tournament Gold Medal
- 2011 Hato Mayor Beach Volleyball Tournament Gold Medal
