= Gina Mambrú =

Dominican Republic volleyball player

Personal information
- Full name: Gina Altagracia Mambrú Casilla
- Nationality: Dominican
- Born: January 21, 1986 (age 40); Santo Domingo
- Hometown: Santo Domingo
- Height: 1.82 m (5 ft 11 1/2 in)
- Weight: 65 kg (143 lb)
- Spike: 330 cm (130 in)
- Block: 315 cm (124 in)

Volleyball information
- Position: Opposite spiker
- Number: 17

National team
2008–	Dominican Republic
Honours
Women's volleyball
Representing the Dominican Republic
World Grand Champions Cup
Bronze medal – third place	2009 Tokyo/Fukuoka	Team
Pan American Games
Bronze medal – third place	2015 Toronto	Team
Pan-American Cup
Gold medal – first place	2010 Rosarito/Tijuana	Team
Gold medal – first place	2014 Mexico City	Team
Gold medal – first place	2016 Santo Domingo	Team
Silver medal – second place	2009 Miami	Team
Silver medal – second place	2011 Ciudad Juárez	Team
Silver medal – second place	2015 Lima/Callao	Team
Silver medal – second place	2017 Cañete/Lima	Team
Silver medal – second place	2018 Santo Domingo	Team
NORCECA Championship
Gold medal – first place	2009 Bayamón	Team
Silver medal – second place	2013 Omaha	Team
Final Four Cup
Gold medal – first place	2010 Chiapas	Team
Silver medal – second place	2008 Fortaleza	Team
Bronze medal – third place	2009 Lima	Team
Central American and Caribbean Games
Gold medal – first place	2010 Mayagüez	Team
Gold medal – first place	2014 Veracruz	Team
Gold medal – first place	2018 Barranquilla	Team
- Last updated: June 2013

Gina Altagracia Mambrú Casilla (born January 21, 1986) is a volleyball player from the Dominican Republic, who played the 2012 Olympic Games and the 2014 World Championship ranking fifth in both competitions. She won the gold medal at the 2010 and 2014 Central American and Caribbean Games and bronze at the 2015 Pan American Games.

== Early life ==
Altagracia used to be a ballet dancer before becoming a volleyball player for Los Cachorros club.

== Career ==
Mambru played at the 2005 FIVB U20 Volleyball World Championship in Ankara, Turkey. Her team finished in 9th place. She played as opposite and wore the #16 jersey.

With her Junior National Team at the 2006 U-20 NORCECA Women´s Junior Continental Championship, she won the Best attacker award. Her team won the silver medal.

Playing with the Brazilian team Vôlei Futuro for the 2009/2010 season, she won the "Best server" award in the Brazilian Superliga (Superliga Brasileira de Voleibol).

=== 2010 ===
Playing in Chiapas, Mexico, with her National Senior Team, she won the 2010 Final Four Cup gold medal.

Mambrú was sidelined in October from the Dominican Republic 2010 FIVB World Championship squad, because she suffered a thrombosis, from she is recovered.

=== 2011 ===
In early 2011, Altagracia received for magnificent performance during 2010, making her the recipient of the 2010 Dominican Republic "Volleyball Player of the Year".

=== 2012 ===
Mambru played the 2012 Olympic tournament and her national team ranked 5th, after losing the quarterfinal match 3–0 against the United States.

=== 2013 ===
She won the bronze medal at the Montreux Volley Masters defeating Italy 3–1 after dropping the semifinals 0–3 from Brazil.

=== 2015 ===
Mambru helped her national team to win the Pan American Games bronze medal when they defeated the Puerto Rico national team 3–1. She was awarded tournament's Best Server.

== Clubs ==
- (Dominican Republic) Los Cachorros (2001–2005)
- (Spain) Voley Sanse Mepaban (2006–2007)
- (Dominican Republic) Distrito Nacional (2007)
- (Trinidad and Tobago) Sportway Challengers (2008)
- (Dominican Republic) Centro Deportivo Nacional (2008)
- (Japan) Ageo Medics (2008–2009)
- (Brazil) Vôlei Futuro (2009–2010)
- (Dominican Republic) Distrito Nacional (2010)
- (Turkey) Beşiktaş (2014–2015)
- (Dominican Republic) Mirador (2015)
- (Italy) Südtirol Neruda Bolzano (2015–2016)
- (Indonesia) Pgn Popsivo Polwan (2016–2017)
- (Indonesia) Pgn Popsivo Polwan (2019–2020)
- (Turkey) İller Bankası (2020–2021)
- (Indonesia) Jakarta Mandiri Popsivo Polwan (2022)
- (Turkey) ALS Volleyball Club Turquía (2022–2023)
- (Vietnam) Ho Chi Minh City VC (2023)

== Awards ==
=== Individuals ===
- 2006 NORCECA Women´s Junior Continental Championship U-20 "Best spiker"
- 2007 Dominican Volleyball League "Most valuable player"
- 2010 Dominican Republic "Volleyball Player of the Year"
- 2009/2010 Superliga Brasileira de Voleibol "Best server"
- 2010 World Championship NORCECA Qualification Pool H "Most valuable player"
- 2010 World Championship NORCECA Qualification Pool H "Best server"
- 2012 FIVB Volleyball World Grand Prix "Best scorer"
- 2013 FIVB World Grand Champions Cup "Best opposite spiker"
- 2014 Central American and Caribbean Games "Best server"
- 2015 Pan American Games "Best server"

=== National team ===
==== U-20 National Team ====
- 2006 NORCECA Women´s Junior Continental Championship U-20, Silver Medal

==== Senior team ====
- 2008 Final Four Cup, Silver Medal
- 2009 NORCECA Championship, Gold Medal
- 2009 FIVB World Grand Champions Cup, Bronze Medal
- 2009 Pan-American Cup, Silver Medal
- 2009 Final Four Cup, Bronze Medal
- 2010 Final Four Women's Cup - Gold Medal
- 2010 Central American and Caribbean Games - Gold Medal
- 2010 Pan-American Cup - Gold Medal
- 2014 Central American and Caribbean Games - Gold Medal
- 2015 Pan American Games "Bronze medal"

=== Clubs ===
- 2007 Dominican Volleyball League - Champion, with Distrito Nacional
- 2008 International Women's Volleyball League - 3rd Place, with Sportway Challengers
- 2013 Puerto Rican League - Runner-Up, with Pinkin de Corozal
- 2022 Indonesian Proliga - 3rd place, with Jakarta Mandiri Popsivo Polwan
