= Cándida Arias =

Dominican Republic volleyball player

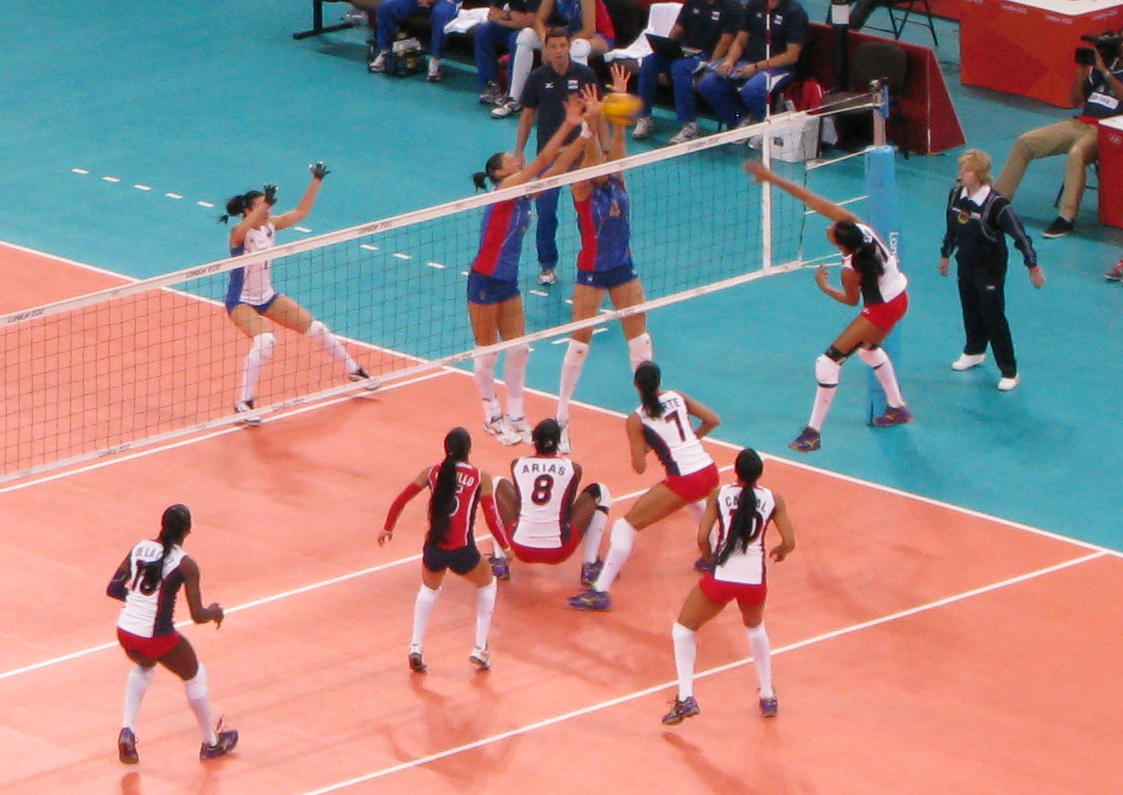

Personal information
- Full name: Cándida Estefany Arias Pérez
- Nickname: Yaguate
- Nationality: Dominican
- Born: March 11, 1992 (age 34); Yaguate, Dominican Republic
- Hometown: Santo Domingo
- Height: 1.92 m (6 ft 4 in)
- Weight: 80 kg (176 lb)
- Spike: 340 cm (130 in)
- Block: 330 cm (130 in)

Volleyball information
- Position: Middle Blocker
- Number: 15

National team
2009 –	Dominican Republic
Honours
Women's volleyball
Representing the Dominican Republic
Pan American Games
Gold medal – first place	2019 Lima	Team
Gold medal – first place	2023 Santiago	Team
World Grand Champions Cup
Bronze medal – third place	2009 Tokyo/Fukuoka	Team
U20 World Championship
Silver medal – second place	2009 Mexicali/Tijuana	Team
NORCECA Championship
Gold medal – first place	2009 Bayamón	Team
Pan American Cup
Gold medal – first place	2010 Rosarito/Tijuana	Team
Gold medal – first place	2022 Hermosillo	Team
Central American and Caribbean Games
Gold medal – first place	2014 Veracruz	Team
Gold medal – first place	2026 Santo Domingo	Team
Final Four Cup
Gold medal – first place	2010 Chiapas	Team
Bronze medal – third place	2009 Lima	Team
U23 Pan-American Cup
Gold medal – first place	2012 Callao	Team
- Last updated: November 2023

Cándida Estefany Arias Pérez (born March 11, 1992, in Yaguate, San Cristóbal) is a volleyball player from the Dominican Republic, who won the bronze medal with her native country at the 2008 NORCECA Girls' U18 Volleyball Continental Championship in Guaynabo, Puerto Rico wearing the jersey number 15. She also competed in two Olympic Games for the Dominican Republic (2012 and 2024).

== Career ==
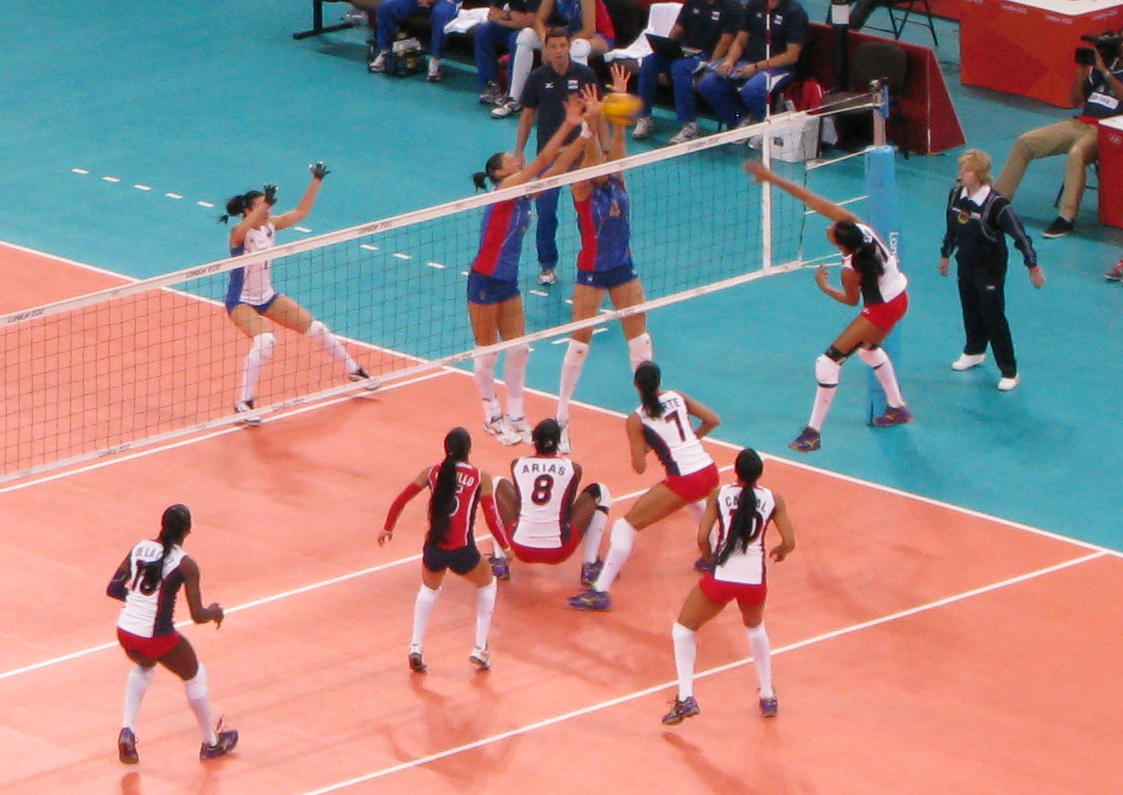
Arias (centre) as part of the Dominican Republic women's volleyball team at the 2012 London Olympics

She debuted with her senior national team in June 2009, at the 2010 World Championship NORCECA Qualification Pool H, at Santiago de los Caballeros, Dominican Republic, helping her team to qualify to the world event.

With her U-18 team she won the 11th place at the 2009 Girls Youth Volleyball World Championship held in Nakhon Ratchasima, Thailand, and shortly afterwards, won the silver medal with the National Junior Team at the 2009 Women's U20 Volleyball World Championship.

Arias played in Chiapas, Mexico, with her National Senior Team, helping her team to win the 2010 Final Four Cup gold medal.

In June 2011, Arias played with her National Junior Team at the U-20 Pan-American Cup, held in Peru. There Arias win the "Best Blocker" award while her team won the silver medal.

The Peruvian team San Martín de Porres signed Arias for the second leg of the 2012 season, as her first international club experience.

In September 2012, Arias won the gold medal and the Best Blocker award at the first 2012 U23 Pan-American Cup, played in Callao, Peru. Arias won the 2013 NORCECA Championship Best Middle Blocker award.

Arias helped win the gold medal at the 2026 Central American and Caribbean Games, the seventh consecutive for her home country.

== Clubs ==
- (Dominican Republic) San Cristóbal (2007)
- (Dominican Republic) Santo Domingo (2008)
- (Dominican Republic) San Cristóbal (2008)
- (Dominican Republic) Madre Vieja (2009)
- (Dominican Republic) Mirador (2010–2011)
- (Peru) Universidad San Martín (2011–2013)
- (Russia) Primorotchka (2013–2014)

== Awards ==
=== Individuals ===
- 2007 Dominican Volleyball League "Best Blocker"
- 2011 Junior Pan-American Cup "Best Blocker"
- 2012 Copa Latina "Best Blocker"
- 2011–12 Liga Nacional Superior de Voleibol "Best Blocker"
- 2012 U23 Pan-American Cup "Best Blocker"
- 2013 NORCECA Championship "Best Middle Blocker"
- 2014 Pan-American Cup "Best Middle Blocker"

=== National team ===
==== Senior team ====
- 2009 FIVB World Grand Champions Cup – Bronze Medal
- 2009 NORCECA Championship – Gold Medal
- 2009 Final Four Women's Cup – Bronze Medal
- 2010 Final Four Women's Cup – Gold Medal
- 2010 Pan-American Cup – Gold Medal

==== Junior team ====
- 2009 FIVB U20 Volleyball World Championship – Silver Medal
- 2008 NORCECA Girls Youth Continental Championship U-18 – Bronze Medal
- 2011 Junior Pan-American Cup – Silver Medal
- 2012 U23 Pan-American Cup – Gold Medal

=== Clubs ===
- Dominican Republic Distrito Nacional Superior Tournament 2006 – Champion, with Mirador
- Dominican Republic Volleyball League 2008 – Runner-Up, with San Cristóbal
- 2011–12 Peruvian League – Runner-Up, with Universidad San Martín
- 2012–13 Peruvian League – Runner-Up, with Universidad San Martín
