= Bethania de la Cruz =

Dominican Republic volleyball player

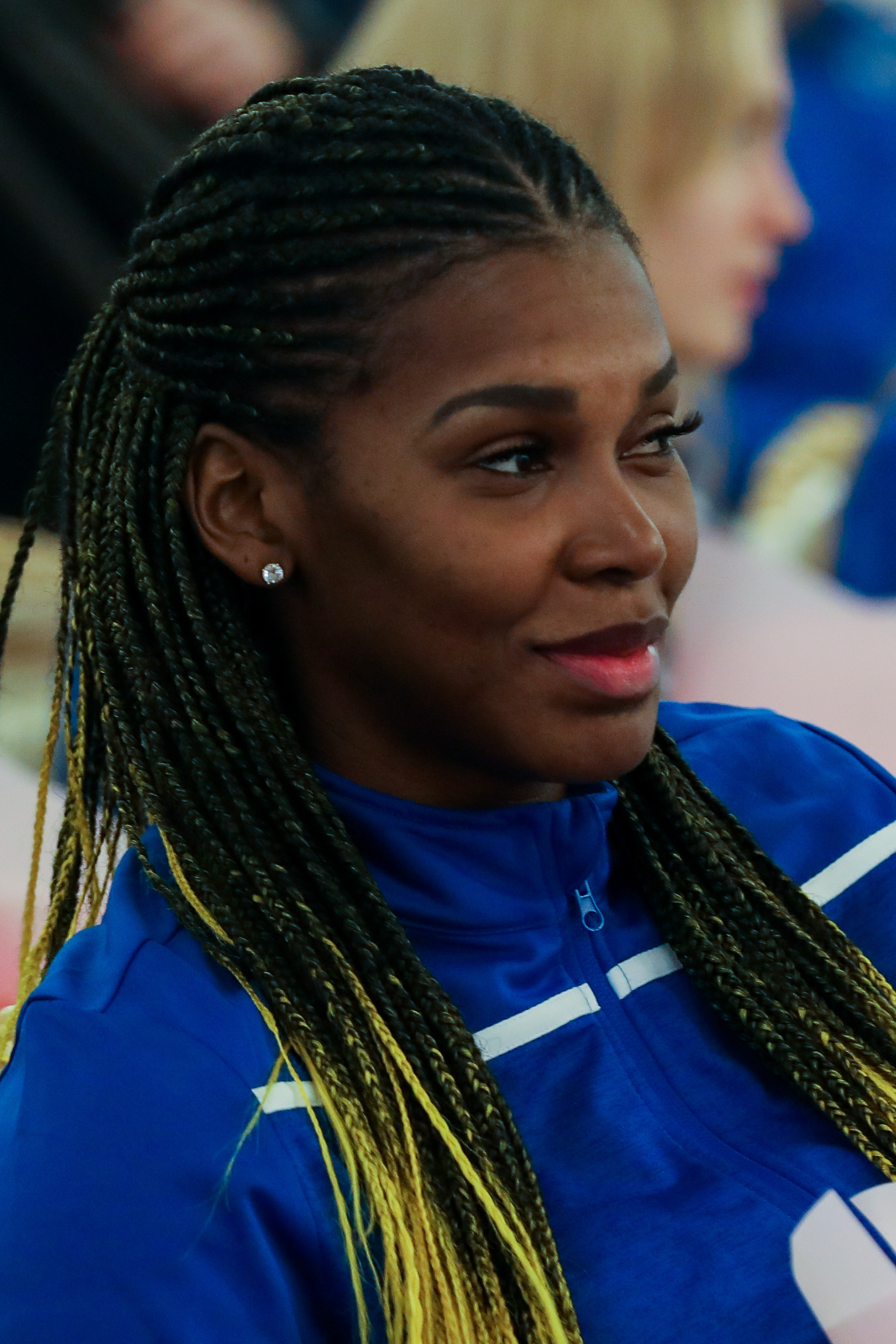
- Cruz in 2020

Personal information
- Full name: Bethania de la Cruz de Peña
- Nationality: Dominican
- Born: May 13, 1987 (age 39); Santo Domingo
- Hometown: Santo Domingo
- Height: 1.84 m (6 ft 0 in)
- Weight: 68 kg (150 lb)
- Spike: 330 cm (130 in)
- Block: 320 cm (130 in)

Volleyball information
- Position: Opposite spiker/Outside Hitter
- Current club: Athletes Unlimited Pro Volleyball
- Number: 18

National team
2005 -	Dominican Republic
Honours
Women's volleyball
Representing the Dominican Republic
Pan American Games
Gold medal – first place	2019 Lima	Team
Gold medal – first place	2023 Santiago	Team
Bronze medal – third place	2015 Toronto	Team
NORCECA Championship
Gold medal – first place	2021 Guadalajara	Team
Gold medal – first place	2019 San Juan	Team
Gold medal – first place	2009 Bayamón	Team
Silver medal – second place	2011 Caguas	Team
Silver medal – second place	2013 Omaha	Team
Bronze medal – third place	2005 Port of Spain	Team
Bronze medal – third place	2007 Winnipeg	Team
Pan-American Cup
Gold medal – first place	2008 Mexicali/Tijuana	Team
Gold medal – first place	2016 Santo Domingo	Team
Gold medal – first place	2022 Hermosillo	Team
Silver medal – second place	2009 Miami	Team
Silver medal – second place	2011 Ciudad Juárez	Team
Silver medal – second place	2013 Lima	Team
Silver medal – second place	2017 Cañete/Lima	Team
Silver medal – second place	2018 Santo Domingo	Team
Silver medal – second place	2019 Trujillo and Chiclayo	Team
Bronze medal – third place	2006 San Juan	Team
Bronze medal – third place	2007 Colima	Team
Central American and Caribbean Games
Gold medal – first place	2006 Cartagena	Team
Gold medal – first place	2014 Veracruz	Team
Final Four Cup
Gold medal – first place	2010 Chiapas	Team
Silver medal – second place	2008 Fortaleza	Team
Bronze medal – third place	2009 Lima	Team
- Last updated: October 2013

Bethania de la Cruz de Peña (born May 13, 1987) is a volleyball player from the Dominican Republic, currently playing for the Omaha Supernovas of the Pro Volleyball Federation. She is best known for winning the gold medal with the Dominican women's national team at the 2009 NORCECA Championship and the 2010 Pan-American Cup.

== Career ==
=== 2006 ===
De la Cruz won the Most Valuable Player award when she helped her Dominican professional club Mirador to win the Championship. Playing with her Junior National Team at the 2006 U-20 NORCECA Women's Junior Continental Championship, she won the Most valuable player and Best scorer awards. Her team won the silver medal. She became the MVP of the 2006 TV Azteca's Women Stars Volleyball Cup, played in Monterrey, Mexico won by the team with a perfect record in 5 matches. Previously, she won the bronze medal in beach volleyball at the 2006 National Championship, playing with Karla Echenique. After that season she became "Dominican Republic Volleyball Player of the Year".

=== 2007 ===
At the 2007 Pan-American Cup she took the bronze medal with her National Team and also the Best scorer award. She took the same award later at the 2007 NORCECA Championship.

She played with the Puerto Rican professional team Vaqueras de Bayamón for the 2007 season, being awarded as MVP of the All-Star Game, and the "Best spiker" of the season.

=== 2008 ===
For the 2007/2008 season of the Japanese V.Premier League she played with the Toray Arrows, finishing as league champion and "Best 6". At the end of the season she won for the second time the "2008 Dominican Republic Volleyball Player of the Year".

With her National Team, she won the silver medal and the "Best attacker" and "Best scorer" at the 2008 Final Four Cup. Same year was awarded "Best attacker" at the 2008 edition of the Salonpas Cup.

The next season, 2008/2009, she played for the South Korean team GS Caltex.

=== 2009 ===
The Dominican Republic Guild of Sport Writers make her recipient of the 2008 Volleyball Athlete of the Year. In June 2009, at the 2010 World Championship NORCECA Qualification Pool H, at Santiago de los Caballeros, Dominican Republic, she won the Best Spiker award. A month later, she carry her National Team to the silver medal at the 2009 Pan-American Cup, and she was elected Most valuable player of the event.

After winning with her team the 2009 NORCECA Championship, she took a sabbatical year due to maternity.

=== 2010 ===
Returning from the sabbatical year, De La Cruz joined her National Senior Team winning the 2010 Final Four Cup gold medal.

De la Cruz played with the local team Navarrete from Santiago, Dominican Republic, taking the team to the final series. During the final series, Bethania left the team to participate with Mirador at the World Club Championship, taking the fourth place. Later Navarrete would take the Santiago Intermunicipal Championship.

=== 2011 ===
Bethania joined the Canadian Stacey Gordon and countrymate Brenda Castillo at the Puerto Rican team Criollas de Caguas to play the 2011 Puerto Rican League season, leading the team to win the regular season with a 20–2 record. De la Cruz set a new record in serving, with 57 aces, topped the scorers with 392 points and won the Most valuable player award. Despite all these awards, Bethania said she wasn't in plenty physically shape.

During the quarterfinals, she set another record with 9 aces in a playoff match. Bethania crowned the season winning the Puerto Rico League Championship, sweeping the final series against the Mets de Guaynabo.

De La Cruz win the MVP award and the silver medal at the 2011 NORCECA Championship. One month later, Bethania participated with her home team at the 2011 Pan American Games held in Guadalajara, Mexico. She won the Best Scorer award and her team finished in 4th place.

The Japanese club Denso Airybees, announced her joining in November 2011.

Bethania win the Best Scorer and Best Server awards at the 2011 World Cup played in November in Japan. As the key player for her team, she was four times the Top Scorer by day and had three of the five best performances during the competition, including 42 points Vs. Germany on November 12. Her national team finished in the 8th place.

=== 2012-2015 ===
For her performances during 2011, De la Cruz was named Volleyball Player of the Year and nominated for the top national award of Athlete of the Year, later won by taekwondo practitioner and Olympic medalist Gabriel Mercedes and was awarded by the Dominican Republic Guild of Sport Writers among the 2011 Volleyball Athlete of the Year.

De la Cruz joined the Turkish club Eczacıbaşı VitrA and help them win the 2014–15 CEV Champions League by defeating 3–0 to the Italian Yamamay Busto Arsizio. She was named one of the Best Outside Spikers from the competition. This championship qualified her club to the 2015 FIVB Club World Championship that her team won after beating the Russian Dinamo Krasnodar.

=== 2016- ===
She joined the ongoing 2019 Indonesian Proliga club Jakarta Pertamina Energi starting in the second round, and helping her club to reach the league's second place and winning the Best Server individual award. De la Cruz joined Mirador for the 2019 season of the Dominican Republic Superior Volleyball League from the National District winning the League Championship and being awarded Most Valuable Player and Best Spiker.

She then headed to Russia, having signed with Dynamo Kazan. With this club she won the 2019 Russian Cup gold medal and the Best Server award. Because of the COVID-19 pandemic in Russia the championship stopped and Dinamo Kazan was declared season's champion. She was offered an extension for the 2020/21 season, but she took so long to answer. she was awarded jointly with Brayelin Martinez 2019 Volleyball Athlete of the Year by the Dominican Republic Guild of Sport Writers.

De la Cruz finished in the second place during the 2021 season of the players centered, American league Athletes Unlimited Volleyball, after recording 3,690 points, just behind Olympic American player Jordan Larson, who recorded 4,569. She was named 2021 Volleyball Player of the Year and nominated for the Athlete of the Year award, the latter finally won by water skier Robert Pigozzi. For the 2021 Club World Championship, she joined the Kazakh club Altay Volleyball Club.

=== 2024 ===
De la Cruz played for the Omaha Supernovas of the Pro Volleyball Federation in their inaugural 2024 season.

De la Cruz competed in season 4 of Athletes Unlimited Pro Volleyball.

== Clubs ==
- (Dominican Republic) Deportivo Nacional (2001–2004)
- (Dominican Republic) Mirador (2004–2006)
- (Puerto Rico) Vaqueras de Bayamón (2007)
- (Japan) Toray Arrows (2007–2008)
- (South Korea) GS Caltex (2008–2009)
- (Dominican Republic) Navarrete (2010)
- (Dominican Republic) Mirador (2010)
- (Puerto Rico) Criollas de Caguas (2011)
- (Japan) Denso Airybees (2011–2012)
- (South Korea) GS Caltex (2012–2014)
- (Turkey) Eczacıbaşı VitrA (2014–2015)
- (Russia) Dinamo Moscow (2016–2017)
- (Italy) Savino Del Bene Scandicci (2017–2018)
- (Indonesia) Jakarta Pertamina Energi (2019)
- (Dominican Republic) Mirador (2019)
- (Russia) Dynamo Kazan (2019–2020)
- (United States) Athletes Unlimited Volleyball (2021–2024)
- (Kazakhstan) Altay Volleyball Club (2021/22)
- (United States) Omaha Supernovas (2024)
- (United States) Athletes Unlimited Volleyball (2025)

== Awards ==
=== Individuals ===
- 2006 Dominican Republic Torneo Superior del Distrito Nacional "Regular Series Most Valuable Player"'
- 2006 Dominican Republic Torneo Superior del Distrito Nacional "Final Series Most Valuable Player"'
- 2006 Dominican Republic Torneo Superior del Distrito Nacional "Best spiker"'
- 2006 NORCECA Women's Junior Continental Championship U-20 "Most valuable player"
- 2006 NORCECA Women's Junior Continental Championship U-20 "Best scorer"
- 2006 TV Azteca's Women Stars Volleyball Cup "Most valuable player"
- 2007 Puerto Rican League "Best attacker"
- 2007 Puerto Rican League All-Star
- 2007 Puerto Rican League All-Star Game "Most valuable player"
- 2007 NORCECA Championship "Best scorer"
- 2007 Pan-American Cup "Best scorer"
- 2007 Pan-American Games "Best scorer"
- 2007 Dominican Republic "Volleyball Player of the Year"
- 2007-08 Women's V.Premier League Best 6
- 2008 Final Four Cup "Best scorer"
- 2008 Final Four Cup "Best attacker"
- 2008 Salonpas Cup "Best attacker"
- 2008 Dominican Republic "Volleyball Player of the Year"
- 2008–2009 NH Bank Cup Korean V-League "All-Star"
- 2008–2009 NH Bank Cup Korean V-League "Best Player of 1st. Round"
- 2008–2009 NH Bank Cup Korean V-League "Best attacker"
- 2010 World Championship NORCECA Qualification Pool H "Best spiker"
- 2009 Pan-American Cup "Most valuable player"
- 2009 Pan-American Cup "Best server"
- 2011 Puerto Rican League "Most valuable player"
- 2011 Puerto Rican League "Best scorer"
- 2011 Puerto Rican League "Best server"
- 2011 NORCECA Championship "Most valuable player"
- 2011 Dominican Republic "Volleyball Player of the Year"
- 2011 Pan American Games "Best scorer"
- 2011 World Cup "Best scorer"
- 2011 World Cup "Best server"
- 2012 Summer Olympics NORCECA qualification tournament's MVP
- 2011–2012 Japanese League – "Best scorer"
- 2011–2012 Japanese League – "Best server"
- 2011–2012 Japanese League – "Best 6"
- 2013 NORCECA Championship "Best outside hitter"
- 2014 Pan-American Cup "Best outside spiker"
- 2014–15 CEV Women's Champions League "Best outside spiker"
- 2017 Pan-American Cup "Best outside spiker"
- 2019 Indonesian Proliga – "Best server"
- 2019 Dominican Republic Superior Volleyball League – "Most valuable player"
- 2019 Dominican Republic Superior Volleyball League – "Best spiker"
- 2019 Pan American Games "Best outside hitter"
- 2019 Pan American Games "Most valuable player"
- 2019 NORCECA Championship "Best server"
- 2019 Russian Cup – "Best server"
- 2021 NORCECA Championship "Best outside spiker"
- 2021 Dominican Republic "Volleyball Player of the Year"
- 2022 Athletes Unlimited "Individual Champion"
- 2022 Athletes Unlimited "Best outside hitter"

=== Beach Volleyball ===
- 2006 National Championship — Bronze Medal

=== National team ===
==== Senior team ====
- 2006 TV Azteca's Women Stars Volleyball Cup — Gold Medal

==== Junior team ====
- 2006 NORCECA Women's Junior Continental Championship U-20 — Silver Medal

==== Clubs ====
- 2006 Dominican Republic Torneo Superior del Distrito Nacional — Champion, with Mirador
- 2007 Japan Empress's Cup — Champion, with Toray Arrows
- 2007-08 Japan V.Premier League — Champion, with Toray Arrows
- 2011 Puerto Rican League — Champion, with Criollas de Caguas
- 2011-12 Japan V.Premier League — Bronze medal, with Denso Airybees
- 2012–13 Korean League – Runner-Up, with GS Caltex
- 2012–13 Korean Cup — Champion, with GS Caltex
- 2013–14 Korean League — Champion, with GS Caltex
- 2014–15 CEV Champions League — Champion, with Eczacıbaşı VitrA
- 2014–15 Turkish Women's Volleyball League – Bronze medal, with Eczacıbaşı VitrA
- 2015 FIVB Club World Championship – Champion, with Eczacıbaşı VitrA
- 2016 Russian Cup — Runner-Up, with Dinamo Moscow
- 2016–17 Russian Championship – Champion, with Dinamo Moscow
- 2019 Indonesian Proliga — Runner-Up, with Jakarta Pertamina Energi
- 2019 Dominican Republic Superior Volleyball League — Champion, with Mirador
- 2019 Russian Cup — Champion, with Dynamo Kazan
- 2019–20 Russian Championship – Champion, with Dynamo Kazan
