= 2017 Women's Junior Pan-American Volleyball Cup =

Tournament details
- Host country: Costa Rica
- Dates: May 8 – 13, 2017
- Teams: 9
- Venue: 1 (in San José host cities)

Final positions
- Champions: United States (1st title)

Tournament awards
- MVP: Thayer Hall (USA)

The 2017 Women's Junior Pan-American Volleyball Cup was the fourth edition of the bi-annual women's volleyball tournament. Nine teams participated in this edition held in San José, Costa Rica.

== Competing nations ==
Group A	Group B	Group C
Argentina; Dominican Republic; United States	Costa Rica; Puerto Rico; Uruguay	Chile; Cuba; Peru

== Competition format ==
- Nine teams will be divided into three pools. In the group stage each pool will play round robin.
- The two best teams from the first rank team of each pool after group stage will receive byes into the semifinals.
- The remaining first-rank team will play in the quarterfinals along with the second-rank teams.

== Preliminary round ==
- All times are in Costa Rica Standard Time (UTC−06:00)

=== Group A ===
Pos	Team	Pld	W	L	Pts	SPW	SPL	SPR	SW	SL	SR	Qualification
1	United States	2	2	0	8	186	178	1.045	6	2	3.000	Quarterfinals
2	Argentina	2	1	1	6	163	145	1.124	4	3	1.333	Quarterfinals
3	Dominican Republic	2	0	2	1	145	171	0.848	1	6	0.167	

Date	Time		Score		Set 1	Set 2	Set 3	Set 4	Set 5	Total	Report
8 May	17:30	Argentina	3–0	Dominican Republic	25–17	25–18	25–20			75–55	P2 P3
9 May	19:30	United States	3–1	Argentina	25–23	25–19	15–25	25–21		90–88	P2 P3
10 May	17:30	Dominican Republic	1–3	United States	22–25	25–21	22–25	21–25		90–96	P2 P3

=== Group B ===
Pos	Team	Pld	W	L	Pts	SPW	SPL	SPR	SW	SL	SR	Qualification
1	Puerto Rico	2	2	0	10	150	102	1.471	6	0	MAX	Semifinals
2	Uruguay	2	1	1	4	147	163	0.902	3	4	0.750	Quarterfinals
3	Costa Rica	2	0	2	1	141	173	0.815	1	6	0.167	

Date	Time		Score		Set 1	Set 2	Set 3	Set 4	Set 5	Total	Report
8 May	19:30	Costa Rica	1–3	Uruguay	21–25	18–25	25–22	24–26		88–98	P2 P3
9 May	15:30	Uruguay	0–3	Puerto Rico	16–25	19–25	14–25			49–75	P2 P3
10 May	19:30	Costa Rica	0–3	Puerto Rico	19–25	19–25	15–25			53–75	P2 P3

=== Group C ===
Pos	Team	Pld	W	L	Pts	SPW	SPL	SPR	SW	SL	SR	Qualification
1	Cuba	2	2	0	9	173	131	1.321	6	1	6.000	Semifinals
2	Peru	2	1	1	6	166	157	1.057	4	3	1.333	Quarterfinals
3	Chile	2	0	2	0	99	150	0.660	0	6	0.000	

Date	Time		Score		Set 1	Set 2	Set 3	Set 4	Set 5	Total	Report
8 May	15:30	Cuba	3–0	Chile	25–17	25–11	25–12			75–40	P2 P3
9 May	17:30	Chile	0–3	Peru	23–25	16–25	20–25			59–75	P2 P3
10 May	15:30	Peru	1–3	Cuba	27–29	24–26	25–18	15–25		91–98	P2 P3

== Final round ==
=== Championship bracket ===
Quarterfinals
1A	United States	3
2B	Uruguay	0
2A	Argentina	3
2C	Peru	0

Semifinals
1C	Cuba	1
1A	United States	3
1B	Puerto Rico	0
2A	Argentina	3

Finals
1A	United States	3
2A	Argentina	0
Third place
1C	Cuba	3
1B	Puerto Rico	0

=== 9th place match ===
Date	Time		Score		Set 1	Set 2	Set 3	Set 4	Set 5	Total	Report
11 May	15:30	Costa Rica	0–3	Chile	15–25	8–25	19–25			42–75	P2 P3

=== Quarterfinals ===
Date	Time		Score		Set 1	Set 2	Set 3	Set 4	Set 5	Total	Report
11 May	17:30	Argentina	3–0	Peru	25–16	25–18	25–19			75–53	P2 P3
11 May	19:30	United States	3–0	Uruguay	25–10	25–19	25–17			75–46	P2 P3

=== 7th place match ===
Date	Time		Score		Set 1	Set 2	Set 3	Set 4	Set 5	Total	Report
12 May	15:30	Dominican Republic	3–0	Chile	25–19	25–17	25–12			75–48	P2 P3

=== Semifinals ===
Date	Time		Score		Set 1	Set 2	Set 3	Set 4	Set 5	Total	Report
12 May	17:30	Cuba	1–3	United States	17–25	23–25	32–30	20–25		92–105	P2 P3
12 May	19:30	Puerto Rico	0–3	Argentina	21–25	11–25	9–25			41–75	P2 P3

=== 5th place match ===
Date	Time		Score		Set 1	Set 2	Set 3	Set 4	Set 5	Total	Report
13 May	15:30	Peru	3–0	Uruguay	25–14	25–22	25–10			75–46	P2 P3

=== 3rd place match ===
Date	Time		Score		Set 1	Set 2	Set 3	Set 4	Set 5	Total	Report
13 May	17:30	Cuba	3–0	Puerto Rico	25–18	25–21	25–20			75–59	P2 P3

=== Final ===
Date	Time		Score		Set 1	Set 2	Set 3	Set 4	Set 5	Total	Report
13 May	19:30	United States	3–0	Argentina	27–25	25–22	25–22			77–69	P2 P3

== Final standing ==
Rank	Team
1st place, gold medalist(s)	United States
2nd place, silver medalist(s)	Argentina
3rd place, bronze medalist(s)	Cuba
4	Puerto Rico
5	Peru
6	Uruguay
7	Dominican Republic
8	Chile
9	Costa Rica

Qualified for FIVB U20 World Championship

2017 Women's Junior Pan-American Cup champions

United States
1st title

== Individual awards ==
- Most valuable player
  - Thayer Hall (USA)
- Best scorer
  - Heidy Casanova (CUB)
- Best setter
  - Gretell Moreno (CUB)
- Best Opposite
  - Heidy Casanova (CUB)
- Best Outside Hitters
  - Ailama Cese (CUB)
  - Diaris Pérez (CUB)
- Best Middle Blockers
  - Geraldine González (DOM)
  - Laura Suárez (CUB)
- Best libero
  - Valentina González (ARG)
- Best server
  - Kris Justiniano (PUR)
- Best receiver
  - Valentina González (ARG)
- Best digger
  - Valentina González (ARG)
