= Volleyball at the 2012 Summer Olympics – Women's tournament NORCECA qualification =

The NORCECA qualification tournament for the 2012 Women's Olympic Volleyball Tournament was held from 29 April – 5 May 2012.

== Venue ==
- High Performance Sports Center of Baja California, Tijuana, Baja California, Mexico

== Preliminary round ==
- All times are Pacific Time Zone (UTC−07:00).

=== Pool A ===
Pos	Team	Pld	W	L	Pts	SPW	SPL	SPR	SW	SL	SR	Qualification
1	Dominican Republic	3	3	0	13	271	181	1.497	9	2	4.500	Semifinals
2	Puerto Rico	3	2	1	11	237	165	1.436	7	3	2.333	Quarterfinals
3	Canada	3	1	2	6	205	200	1.025	4	6	0.667	Quarterfinals
4	Honduras	3	0	3	0	58	225	0.258	0	9	0.000	

Date	Time		Score		Set 1	Set 2	Set 3	Set 4	Set 5	Total	Report
29 Apr	12:00	Dominican Republic	3–0	Honduras	25–5	25–5	25–7			75–17	75–17
29 Apr	17:00	Puerto Rico	3–0	Canada	25–18	25–14	25–21			75–53	P2P3
30 Apr	12:00	Puerto Rico	3–0	Honduras	25–4	25–6	25–4			75–14	P2P3
30 Apr	17:00	Dominican Republic	3–1	Canada	25–12	27–25	21–25	25–15		98–77	P2P3
01 May	12:00	Canada	3–0	Honduras	25–9	25–10	25–8			75–27	P2P3
01 May	17:00	Dominican Republic	3–1	Puerto Rico	22–25	26–24	25–19	25–19		98–87	P2P3

=== Pool B ===
Pos	Team	Pld	W	L	Pts	SPW	SPL	SPR	SW	SL	SR	Qualification
1	Cuba	3	3	0	15	225	117	1.923	9	0	MAX	Semifinals
2	Mexico	3	2	1	10	190	199	0.955	6	3	2.000	Quarterfinals
3	Costa Rica	3	1	2	4	191	229	0.834	3	7	0.429	Quarterfinals
4	Trinidad and Tobago	3	0	3	1	179	240	0.746	1	9	0.111	

Date	Time		Score		Set 1	Set 2	Set 3	Set 4	Set 5	Total	Report
29 Apr	14:00	Cuba	3–0	Trinidad and Tobago	25–15	25–7	25–12			75–34	75–34
29 Apr	19:00	Mexico	3–0	Costa Rica	25–21	25–23	25–14			75–58	P2P3
30 Apr	14:00	Cuba	3–0	Costa Rica	25–22	25–15	25–6			75–43	P2P3
30 Apr	19:00	Mexico	3–0	Trinidad and Tobago	25–14	25–19	25–23			75–56	P2P3
01 May	14:00	Costa Rica	3–1	Trinidad and Tobago	25–19	25–22	15–25	25–13		90–79	P2P3
01 May	19:00	Cuba	3–0	Mexico	25–17	25–14	25–9			75–40	P2P3

== Final round ==
=== Championship bracket ===
Quarterfinals
Puerto Rico	3
Costa Rica	0
Mexico	0
Canada	3

Semifinals
Cuba	3
Puerto Rico	1
Dominican Republic	3
Canada	0

Final
Cuba	1
Dominican Republic	3
3rd place
Puerto Rico	3
Canada	2

=== 5th–8th places bracket ===
5th–8th places
Honduras	0
Costa Rica	3
Trinidad and Tobago	0
Mexico	3

5th place
Costa Rica	0
Mexico	3
7th place
Honduras	0
Trinidad and Tobago	3

=== Quarterfinals ===
Date	Time		Score		Set 1	Set 2	Set 3	Set 4	Set 5	Total	Report
02 May	17:00	Puerto Rico	3–0	Costa Rica	25–12	25–12	25–9			75–33	P2P3
02 May	19:00	Mexico	0–3	Canada	17–25	18–25	18–25			53–75	P2P3

=== 5th–8th places ===
Date	Time		Score		Set 1	Set 2	Set 3	Set 4	Set 5	Total	Report
04 May	12:00	Honduras	0–3	Costa Rica	11–25	9–25	11–25			31–75	P2P3
04 May	19:00	Trinidad and Tobago	0–3	Mexico	13–25	16–25	24–26			53–76	P2P3

=== Semifinals ===
Date	Time		Score		Set 1	Set 2	Set 3	Set 4	Set 5	Total	Report
04 May	14:00	Cuba	3–1	Puerto Rico	23–25	25–17	25–19	25–22		98–83	P2P3
04 May	17:00	Dominican Republic	3–0	Canada	25–15	25–18	25–15			75–48	P2P3

=== 7th place ===
Date	Time		Score		Set 1	Set 2	Set 3	Set 4	Set 5	Total	Report
05 May	12:00	Honduras	0–3	Trinidad and Tobago	10–25	15–25	23–25			48–75	P2P3

=== 5th place ===
Date	Time		Score		Set 1	Set 2	Set 3	Set 4	Set 5	Total	Report
05 May	14:00	Costa Rica	0–3	Mexico	15–25	21–25	22–25			58–75	P2P3

=== 3rd place ===
Date	Time		Score		Set 1	Set 2	Set 3	Set 4	Set 5	Total	Report
05 May	17:00	Puerto Rico	3–2	Canada	25–20	20–25	25–14	23–25	15–11	108–95	P2P3

=== Final ===
Date	Time		Score		Set 1	Set 2	Set 3	Set 4	Set 5	Total	Report
05 May	19:00	Cuba	1–3	Dominican Republic	18–25	23–25	29–27	20–25		90–102	P2P3

== Final standing ==
Rank	Team
1	Dominican Republic
2	Cuba
3	Puerto Rico
4	Canada
5	Mexico
6	Costa Rica
7	Trinidad and Tobago
8	Honduras

== Individual awards ==
- Most valuable player

- Bethania de la Cruz (DOM)

- Best scorer

- Sarah Pavan (CAN)

- Best spiker

- Yoana Palacios (CUB)

- Best blocker

- Annerys Vargas (DOM)

- Best server

- Yanelis Santos (CUB)

- Best digger

- Itzel Gaytan (MEX)

- Best setter

- Vilmarie Mojica (PUR)

- Best receiver

- Brenda Castillo (DOM)

- Best libero

- Brenda Castillo (DOM)
