= Brenda Castillo =

Dominican Republic volleyball player

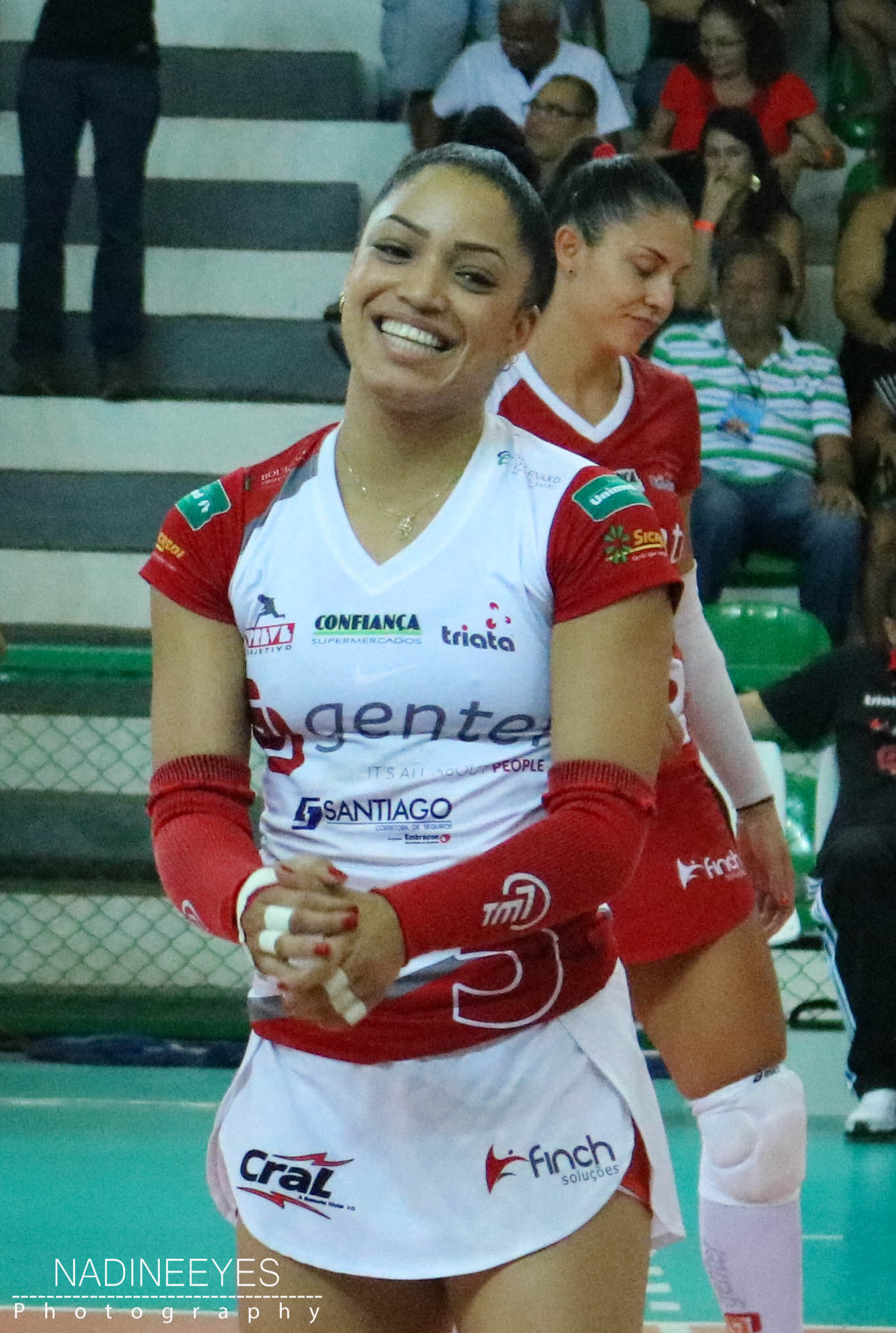
- Castillo in 2017

Personal information
- Full name: Brenda Castillo
- Nationality: Dominican
- Born: June 5, 1992 (age 34); Haina, San Cristóbal
- Hometown: Santo Domingo
- Height: 1.67 m (5 ft 6 in)
- Weight: 55 kg (121 lb)
- Spike: 220 cm (87 in)
- Block: 270 cm (106 in)

Volleyball information
- Position: Libero
- Current club: (Turkey) Fenerbahçe
- Number: 5

National team
2007–	Dominican Republic
Honours
Women's volleyball
Representing the Dominican Republic
Pan American Games
Gold medal – first place	2019 Lima	Team
Gold medal – first place	2023 Santiago	Team
Bronze medal – third place	2015 Toronto	Team
World Grand Champions Cup
Bronze medal – third place	2009 Tokyo/Fukuoka	Team
FIVB U23 World Championship
Silver medal – second place	2013 Tijuana	Team
U20 World Championship
Silver medal – second place	2009 Mexicali/Tijuana	Team
Pan-American Cup
Gold medal – first place	2008 Mexicali/Tijuana	Team
Gold medal – first place	2010 Rosarito/Tijuana	Team
Gold medal – first place	2014 Mexico City	Team
Gold medal – first place	2016 Santo Domingo	Team
Gold medal – first place	2021 Santo Domingo	Team
Gold medal – first place	2022 Hermosillo	Team
Gold medal – first place	2025 Colima	Team
Silver medal – second place	2009 Miami	Team
Silver medal – second place	2011 Ciudad Juárez	Team
Silver medal – second place	2015 Lima/Callao	Team
Silver medal – second place	2017 Cañete/Lima	Team
Silver medal – second place	2018 Santo Domingo	Team
Bronze medal – third place	2007 Colima	Team
NORCECA Championship
Gold medal – first place	2009 Bayamón	Team
Silver medal – second place	2011 Caguas	Team
Silver medal – second place	2013 Omaha	Team
Silver medal – second place	2015 Michoacan	Team
Bronze medal – third place	2007 Winnipeg	Team
Final Four Cup
Gold medal – first place	2010 Chiapas	Team
Silver medal – second place	2008 Fortaleza	Team
Bronze medal – third place	2009 Lima	Team
Central American and Caribbean Games
Gold medal – first place	2010 Mayagüez	Team
Gold medal – first place	2014 Veracruz	Team
Gold medal – first place	2018 Barranquilla	Team
Gold medal – first place	2026 Santo Domingo	Team
- Last updated: November 2017

Brenda Castillo (born June 5, 1992) is a volleyball player from the Dominican Republic and plays as a libero. She was a member of the Dominican Republic national team that won fifth place in the 2012 Summer Olympics, while she was named the tournament's Best Libero. She played in the 2014 World Championship reaching also the fifth place and ranking 17th in the 2010 World Championship and the 2011 FIVB World Cup where her national team ranked eight and the 2015 FIVB World Cup, winning the Best Libero individual award and ranking in seventh place.

She won the silver medal at the 2009 U20 World Championship, 2013 U23 World Championship and Bronze in the 2009 FIVB Women's World Grand Champions Cup and the 2015 Pan American Games. She won the gold medal of the 2009 NORCECA Championship, 2010 Final Four and the 2010 and 2014 Central American and Caribbean Games. Castillo also won the 2008, 2010, 2014 and 2016 Pan American Cup championship.

In club competition, Castillo won the 2011 Puerto Rican League with Criollas de Caguas and the 2012–13, 2013–14 Azerbaijan Super League and 2014–15 with Rabita Baku. She became runner-up with San Cristóbal at the 2008 Dominican Republic Volleyball League and won the silver medal in the 2012–13 and the bronze in the 2013–14 CEV Champions League with Rabita Baku.

== Personal and early life ==
Castillo is 167 cm (5 ft 6 in) tall and weighs 55 kilograms (121 lb). She was born on June 5, 1992, in Haina, San Cristóbal. Her parents are Argentina and Alfonso. She is married to Julio Enrique de los Santos.

She started practicing volleyball when she was ten under the guidance of coach Valentín Arias Pérez in the club Siglo XXI. Her nickname is "Chin Chin", which translates from colloquial Dominican speech as "small portion". She is also recognized for having a pretty face and model looks.

At the San Cristóbal Carnival 2010, Castillo was named Queen of the Carnival, "Reina Califé". After living a hard life, she decided to become a Christian in 2010. Castillo used to arrive late to national team practices because of a problem with alcohol, but decided to change her life in order to help herself and her family.

In January 2015, she revealed via Instagram the pictures of her wedding with Julio Enrique de los Santos. She often shares Bible verses on her Facebook account.

== Career ==
=== 2007 ===
Castillo played with the Senior National Team that traveled to Guadalajara, Spain for a friendly series. She then played the 2007 Women's Pan-American Volleyball Cup in Colima, Mexico. Her team qualified for the 2008 FIVB World Grand Prix with a 3–2 victory in quarterfinals over Puerto Rico, and finally winning the competition's bronze medal with a 3–1 victory over the United States. Castillo then played in the 2007 Pan American Games held in Rio de Janeiro, Brazil. Her national team lost in the quarterfinals after falling to Peru and ending up in fifth place. Castillo played in August her first Worldwide competition by playing the annual FIVB World Grand Prix in Tokyo, Japan then Hong Kong, China and finally Taipei, where her team won their first competition's match ranking in eleventh place overall. After that competition, she moved in September with her national Senior Team to Winnipeg, Canada, playing the NORCECA Championship. There she won the bronze medal.

She then took part in the world cup in the FIVB World Cup when the Dominican Republic was assigned with a wild card. Her country ranked ninth after winning only three matches during the competition. In the second half of December, Castillo played in Monterrey, Mexico the NORCECA Olympic Qualification Tournament; but her team fell 0–3 to Canada in the semifinals getting out of contention for the Olympic berth and later 2–3 to Puerto Rico in the Bronze medal match.

=== 2008 ===
She played for the Senior National Team at the 2008 Olympic Qualification Tournament in Japan. There her team ended up in fourth place, and did not qualify for the 2008 Summer Olympics. She then played in July with her National Junior Team, winning the silver medal at the 2008 NORCECA Junior Continental Championship U-20, and was elected Most Valuable Player, Best Libero, Best Digger and Best Receiver. Shortly afterwards Castillo claimed with her Senior Team the gold medal at the 2008 Women's Pan-American Volleyball Cup in Mexico as a sixteen-year-old. Later that year her team won the silver medal at the Final Four Cup, as she won the Rising Star award.

=== 2009 ===
During the Holy Week Sport Festival held in Hato Mayor, Castillo played Beach Volleyball (three) with Yenifer Calcaño and Evelyn Carrera winning the Gold Medal of the event.

She won with her Senior team the silver medal and the "Rising Star" award at the 2009 Pan-American Cup. In June 2009, at the 2010 World Championship NORCECA Qualification Pool H, at Santiago de los Caballeros, Dominican Republic, she took the public ovation at the Gran Arena del Cibao winning the Best Digger, Best Receiver, Best Libero and MVP awards. She then participated with her Junior National Team she won the silver medal at the 2009 U20 World Championship, being awarded Best Digger, Best Receiver, Best Libero and MVP awards. She won the Best Digger, Best Receiver, Best Libero awards and the bronze medal with her team at the 2009 Final Four Cup held in Lima, Peru. She then played with her Senior National Team, winning the Continental Championship at the 2009 Women's NORCECA Volleyball Championship, and was awarded again, Best Libero, Digger and Receiver. This win qualified her team to the 2009 FIVB Women's World Grand Champions Cup, there she was at the age of 17 one of the youngest players. The Dominican Republic and Castillo won the Bronze Medal of the event.

=== 2010 ===
Castillo crowned her 2009 performance winning the 2010 Dominican Republic "Athlete of the Year" and 2010 Dominican Republic "Volleyball Player of the Year". She started the 2010 year winning the Best Libero, Digger and Receiver awards at the 2010 Pan-American Cup, won by her home team playing in Rosarito and Tijuana. Two weeks after the Pan-Am cup, she won the silver medal and the "Best Libero, Digger and Receiver awards at the 2010 NORCECA Junior Continental Championship U-20.

The Dominican Republic Olympic Committee selected Castillo as the Dominican Republic Flag bearer for the 2010 Central American and Caribbean Games held at Mayagüez, Puerto Rico, from July 17, 2010, to August 1, 2010. In the volleyball tournament of the Regional Games, she won with her team the gold medal. She later played in Chiapas, Mexico winning the Best Libero and Best Receiver awards, along with the gold medal with her National Senior Team at the 2010 Final Four Cup. Castillo later participated in her first Senior World Championship in Japan, finishing second in digs and Best Libero categories, and being 17th with her national team.

At the end of the 2010 year, Brenda joined the Dominican Republic club Mirador that participated in the 2010 FIVB World Club Championship finishing in 4th place with this club and earning the Best Libero award.

=== 2011 ===
The Puerto Rican team Criollas de Caguas signed Brenda for the 2011 season, as her first international club experience, joining the Canadian Stacey Gordon and Dominicans Bethania de la Cruz and Annerys Vargas. She replaced the injured Yarimar Rosa. During the regular season, Brenda accumulated statistics that make her Best Libero and Best Digger, and crowned the season winning the Puerto Rico League Championship, sweeping the final series against the Mets de Guaynabo.

Castillo then played the 2011 Pan-American Cup being awarded with the Best Libero and Best Digger awards, also winning the silver medal with her national team. She then took part of the 2011 Junior World Championship held in Lima, Peru. She helped her Junior National team to reach the 5th place in the tournament. Brenda won the silver medal and the Best Libero, Best Digger and Best Receiver awards at the 2011 NORCECA Championship, held in Caguas, Puerto Rico. She was also awarded the Best Libero, Best Digger and Best Receiver awards at the 2011 Pan American Games where her team finished in fourth place.

Castillo played the 2011 FIVB World Cup and her national team ranked in eight place and she finished in seventh place among the Liberos.

=== 2012 ===
In the Summer Olympics NORCECA qualification tournament played in May in Tijuana, Baja California, Mexico, Castillo saw her team qualify for the 2012 Summer Olympics, winning the gold medal against the Cuban team. She earned awards for the Best Receiver and Best Libero of the competition. Later, she would confessed, that she played the tournament being pregnant and would not be able to play at the Olympic Games. But about one month later, the National Team doctor gynaecologist Albert Fiorinelli Milciades Camilo, announced that Castillo suffered a spontaneous abortion after 19 weeks of pregnancy. Two days later, she predicted that she would start training in 15 days in order to get physically fit to play in the Summer Olympics.

At the Pan-American Cup held in Ciudad Juárez, Mexico, she returned to play with the National team, finishing with her team in the 4th place and winning the Best Libero, Best Digger and Best Receiver awards.

Castillo played at the 2012 Olympic tournament and her national team ranked 5th, after losing the quarterfinal match 3–0 against the United States. Nonetheless, she managed to win the individual award of Best Libero of the competition. She would later recall, as of July 2016, that award as the peak moment of her career.

In September, Castillo won the gold medal and the Best Digger award at the first 2012 U23 Pan-American Cup, played in Callao, Peru.

In early November 2012, Castillo signed with the Azerbaijani club Rabita Baku to play the Azerbaijan Super League and the CEV Champions League. Her goal was to achieve the league championship, even when she was playing without any knowledge of the Azerbaijani language.

=== 2013 ===
As one of the 15 women awarded by the Dominican Republic Olympic Committee in her sport, Castillo won the 2012 Volleyball Player of the Year. Castillo was one of the candidates for the top prize, the Dominican Republic Athlete of the year, along with Félix Sánchez, Luguelín Santos, Yamilet Peña and Aumi Guerra. Castillo was also considered by the volleyball portal Volleyball.it among the candidates for the 2012 Globe Awards prize. She managed to survive Brazilian Fabiana de Oliveira in the semifinal round, but she lost the final round to Italian Enrica Merlo 55% to 45%.

Castillo played the 2012–13 CEV Champions League Final Four held in Istanbul, Turkey. Her team defeated the Italian club Unendo Busto Arsizio 3–2 in the semifinals, but lost 3–0 in the championship match to the Turkish VakıfBank.

In April, Castillo's club, Rabita Baku claimed the Azerbaijan Super League Championship ahead of Igtisadchi Baku and Azerrail Baku, three weeks before the end of the season to win their sixth title in a row. She won the league's Best Libero award. She then played the 28th Montreux Volley Masters held in Montreux, Switzerland, after the invitation received by her National Team for the first time since 2003. Castillo's team won the Bronze Medal defeating Italy 3–1 after dropping the semifinals 0–3 from Brazil. Soon after this tournament, the Dominican Republic National Federation announced the Castillo's separation from the National Team due to erratic behavior and indiscipline.

She would later apologize for her previous behavior and promised to change her attitude, being then readmitted in the national team just in time to take part in the 2013 FIVB World Grand Prix. She helped her team to reach the 10th position in the competition, posting a 3.69 digs per set average, topping all the diggers in the preliminary round. Castillo played in late September the NORCECA Continental Championship, winning the silver medal and the Best Digger award.

Castillo played with her national team at the U23 World Championship, helping her team to win its pool with a 4–1 record. They later had a 3–0 win over the USA team in the semifinals before falling 0–3 to China in the final match. She finished the tournament statistics as the best digger and was awarded Best Libero.

=== 2014 ===
In January, Castillo was selected by the volleyball specialized website Volleywood for the 2013 My Volleywood Idol voting, advancing to the second round but, could not make a final four spot.

After her Azeri club Rabita Baku won the right to host the 2013–14 CEV Champions League Final Four, Castillo's club won the Bronze medal after falling 0–3 to the Russian Dinamo Kazan in the semifinals, but defeating 3–0 to the Turkish Eczacıbaşı VitrA Istanbul in the third place match. She was awarded tournament's Best Libero. She later commented that she felt lucky for playing another year with Rabita Baku and dedicated the club's recent triumph to their fans. This new accolade helped Castillo's popularity to grow in her home country, the Dominican Republic, there she is known as one of the most popular athletes.

Rabita Baku, claimed their sixth title championship by winning the 2013–14 Azerbaijani Super League 3–0 to Azeryol Baku and Castillo won the Best Libero individual award.

The Dominican Republic head coach gave Castillo a little participation during the 2014 FIVB World Championship NORCECA qualification tournament held in La Romana, Dominican Republic, even when the audience claimed for her appearance. Nonetheless, she helped her team to reach a berth to the 2014 World Championship in late May. Later in Mexico City, Mexico, Castillo help her national team to clinch the 2014 Pan American Cup championship and the 2015 Grand Prix berth. For her performance during the tournament, Castillo won the Most Valuable Player, Best Libero, Best Digger and Best Receiver.

Castillo played the FIVB World Grand Prix, being one of the favorites from the attendants during the first week of the competition in Sassari, Italy, resulting in many people waiting in line for Castillo's autograph and pictures. After winning just one match during the Group 1, the Dominican Republic finished in 12th and last place. Nonetheless, With a 3.85 digs per set, Castillo ranked first among her Group.

Hoping to reach a late stage in the World Championship held in Italy, Castillo helped her national team to start the competition undefeated 5–0 after winning over the home team 3–2. She ranked third in defense after the Pool A round robin competition. After a 7–2 start, her team qualified for the first time to the World Championship third round besides losing 2–3 to China, but being unable to reach a semifinal spot after losing their two third round matches 2–3 to China and 0–3 to Brazil. Ultimately Castillo's national team ended up in fifth place.

Castillo returned to Rabita with the ambition of repeating the league championship and later announced a three years deal until 2017 with her Azerbaijani club, before joining again her national team in the volleyball tournament at the Central American and Caribbean Games. After her comments that being favorite make them work harder, she helped her national team to win their fourth consecutive gold medal. Winning the best digger, receiver and libero awards make her also win the tournament's Most Valuable Player.

=== 2015 ===
Because of the Dominican Republic Olympic Committee favoured the individual athletes, Castillo was not taken into account for the 2014 Athlete of the Year award besides of her notable 2014 year results. But she was selected by the Dominican Republic Guild of Sport Writers among the 2014 top athletes, along with boxer Juan Carlos Payano, Major League Baseball pitcher Johnny Cueto and the later top awarded, the tennis player Víctor Estrella Burgos. Nonetheless, Castillo was selected volleyball player of the year.

After a four sets win over Agel Prostějov, only the second win in their Pool A of Castillo's professional team, Rabita Baku in the 2014–15 CEV Champions League but the team were in the middle of a financial crisis and they then lost 0–3 to Dinamo Kazan despite their good reception and defense, and lost 2–3 to Chemik Police in the last Champions League season match. After ranking fourth in their pool A, After the pool play, Castillo was chosen among the magnificent 7 weeks all-star team. they missed the qualification to playoffs and were relegated to the CEV Cup and paired with Béziers Volley Rabita defeated Béziers Volley 3–1 and 3–0 in the return match, and for the second time, they make it to the Cup semifinals. In the semifinals they faced the Russian club Dinamo Krasnodar. But Rabita lost 1–3 in Russia and then lost 0–3 at Baku finishing their CEV Cup season in third place.

Rabita Baku ultimately faced Lokomotiv Baku in the Azerbaijani League final series, winning 3–1 the final series first match and again 3–1 in the second reaching Rabita's local league eight title and she won the league's Best Libero and Best Digger awards.

Castillo later participated in the 2015 Montreux Volley Masters, but her national team lost the fifth place match 1–3 to Germany. Soon after that, she took part of the NORCECA Champions Cup, taking home the gold medal and the qualification for the 2015 FIVB World Cup and also winning the Best Digger award.

Castillo played the Pan-American Cup in Peru, winning the silver medal when her national team lost to the United States 0–3 in the championship match. In spite of that, they qualified to the 2016 FIVB Grand Prix and she won the Best Libero, Digger and Receiver awards.

As part of a historic Dominican Republic delegation to the 2015 Pan American Games, she won with her national team the bronze medal after losing to the United States in the semifinals and defeated 3–1 the Puerto Rico national team. In the World Cup, Castillo also won the best libero award, while her team finished in the seventh place from twelve with a 5–6 record.

On early October, Castillo was awarded Best Libero and Best Digger after her national team lost 1–3 the NORCECA Championship gold medal match against the United States. Later that month, the Azerbaijani club Lokomotiv Baku announced that Castillo have signed a one-year contract with them.

=== 2016 ===
After a 3–0 matches sweep over Azeryol Baku, Castillo helped Lokomotiv Baku to win the 2015–16 Azerbaijan Super League bronze medal and she was awarded Best Digger. She joined her national team, competing in the World Olympic qualification tournament, were her team finished in sixth place from eighth teams, not qualifying for the 2016 Summer Olympics. Even though, her performance made her recipient of the Best Libero individual award. After that, she was selected Best Libero by the social media poll conducted by the specialized portal, World of Volley. She received 9,654 votes to lead the liberos contest. After receive a special salute for that accomplishment from the Women's and Sports commissioner of the Dominican Republic Olympic Committee Dulce Piña, she was sidelined from her national team who won the gold in the World Grand Prix Group II along with Prisilla Rivera to give them a rest. But her coach callEd her for the Pan-American Cup played in home soil. Her team performed with 5–0 in the pool play before defeating Cuba 3–0 and finally to Puerto Rico once again, this time 3–2 to win the gold medal and a berth for the 2017 FIVB World Grand Prix. Castillo was awarded Best Digger, Receiver and Libero. Nonetheless, she expressed that she does not play for the awards, that they come for the strength invested for playing for her native country, and that playing at home brings an extra motivation. Castillo signed with the Brazilian club Genter Vôlei Bauru for the 2016/2017 season.

=== 2017 ===
Genter Vôlei Bauru reached for the first time a Brazilian Superliga quarterfinals berth, but they were defeated by Minas 0–2 in the best-of-three playoff. After losing the first match 0–3, Castillo tattooed the John 3:16 Bible verse in one of her arms saying that these passage guided her life. However, Castillo was chosen among the tournament's best players, winning the Best Digger individual award, after she spent the season leading those statistics. She thanked God and expressed the satisfaction for being among the best of the league and described the accomplishment of playing with teamwork, helping her teammates in every match.

She was called up to the 2017 FIVB World Grand Prix and her national team finished the first round in the Netherlands with a 2–1 mark, But on the way to the second leg in Russia, making a stop in Warsaw, their LOT Polish Airlines flight check found Marianne Fersola, Niverka Marte and Castillo's passports full and could not be stamped anywhere refusing to board them and the whole team decided to stay together. After finally arriving in Russia, the team was overall ranked eight after losing two matches from three played in the second round and Castillo was among the All-Star team from that Russian leg and was leading the WGP Group 1 digs with 3.64 digs per set. The Russian police raided the Dominican team hotel suspecting involvement in white-slave traffic from Latin-American to Russia and Castillo was jailed for two days. But she was detained in the airport along with human trafficking involved people; her Russian travel visa expired on July 15, two days before she tried to leave the country on July 17 and with intervention by the Dominican ambassador in Russia, she could travel to the third round on Thailand and together with Niverka Marte and her head coach joined the rest of the team who had traveled on time. The Dominican team finally ranked eight after losing two matches in the Thai round, not qualifying for the final round.

She took part in the NORCECA 2018 FIVB World Championship qualification tournament in Santo Domingo were her national team won the qualification and the World Championship berth, with Castillo winning the tournament's Most Valuable Player, Best Libero, Best Digger and Best Receiver awards.

=== 2018 ===
Castillo played the 2018 Dominican Republic Superior Volleyball League from the National District, playing with Cristo Rey and winning the tournament's silver medal when her team lost 1–3 to Caribeñas VC. She won the Best Libero, Best Digger and Best Receiver awards. At the 2018 Central American and Caribbean Games, Castillo won with her team the gold medal and the Best Libero and Best Digger individual awards. In the inaugural Nations League her national team performed 3–12 ranking in the fourteenth place. Her team lost 2–3 in the final match of the Pan-American Cup, winning the silver medal. She was awarded the Best Libero, Best Digger and Best Receiver. Castillo played the World Championship in Japan, her team was 3–2 in the first round and 5–4 after the second round and finishing in ninth place when they could not qualify for the third round.

=== 2021 ===
Castillo won with her national team the Pan-American Cup and she was awarded Best Libero, Best Digger and Best Receiver.

=== 2024 ===
She competed in the Summer Olympics representing the Dominican Republic.

=== 2026 ===
Castillo helped her national team to win the gold medal at the 2026 Central American and Caribbean Games, the seventh consecutive for her home country. She was awarded tournament's Best Receiver, Best Digger and Best Libero.

== Clubs ==
- (Dominican Republic) San Cristóbal (2007–2010)
- (Dominican Republic) Pueblo Nuevo (2009)
- (Dominican Republic) Mirador (2010)
- (Puerto Rico) Criollas de Caguas (2011)
- (Azerbaijan) Rabita Baku (2012–2015)
- (Azerbaijan) Lokomotiv Baku (2015–2016)
- (Brazil) Genter Vôlei Bauru (2016–2017)
- (Dominican Republic) Cristo Rey (2017–2019)
- (Brazil) SESI/Vôlei Bauru (2020–2021)
- (Italy) Savino del Bene Scandicci (2021–2023)
- (Italy) Vero Volley Milano (2023–2024)
- (Italy) Savino del Bene Scandicci (2024–2026)
- (Turkey) Fenerbahçe Medicana (2026–)

== Awards ==
=== Individual ===
- 2008 NORCECA Junior Continental Championship U-20 "Most Valuable Player"
- 2008 NORCECA Junior Continental Championship U-20 "Best Libero"
- 2008 NORCECA Junior Continental Championship U-20 "Best Receiver"
- 2008 NORCECA Junior Continental Championship U-20 "Best Digger"
- 2008 Pan-American Cup "Rising Star"
- 2008 Final Four Cup "Rising Star"
- 2008 Dominican Volleyball League "Best Receiver"
- 2008 Dominican Volleyball League "Best Digger"
- 2010 World Championship NORCECA Qualification Pool H "Most Valuable Player"
- 2010 World Championship NORCECA Qualification Pool H "Best Digger"
- 2010 World Championship NORCECA Qualification Pool H "Best Receiver"
- 2010 World Championship NORCECA Qualification Pool H "Best Libero"
- 2009 Pan-American Cup "Rising Star"
- 2009 U20 World Championship "Most Valuable Player"
- 2009 U20 World Championship "Best Libero"
- 2009 U20 World Championship "Best Digger"
- 2009 U20 World Championship "Best Receiver"
- 2009 Final Four Cup "Best Libero"
- 2009 Final Four Cup "Best Digger"
- 2009 Final Four Cup "Best Receiver"
- 2009 NORCECA Championship "Best Libero"
- 2009 NORCECA Championship "Best Digger"
- 2009 NORCECA Championship "Best Receiver"
- 2010 Dominican Republic "Athlete of the Year"
- 2010 Dominican Republic "Volleyball Player of the Year"
- 2010 Pan-American Cup "Best Libero"
- 2010 Pan-American Cup "Best Digger"
- 2010 Pan-American Cup "Best Receiver"
- 2010 NORCECA Junior Continental Championship U-20 "Best Libero"
- 2010 NORCECA Junior Continental Championship U-20 "Best Digger"
- 2010 NORCECA Junior Continental Championship U-20 "Best Receiver"
- 2010 Final Four Cup "Best Libero"
- 2010 Final Four Cup "Best Receiver"
- 2010 World Club Championship "Best Libero"
- 2011 Puerto Rican League "Best Libero"
- 2011 Puerto Rican League "Best Digger"
- 2011 Pan-American Cup "Best Libero"
- 2011 Pan-American Cup "Best Digger"
- 2011 NORCECA Championship "Best Libero"
- 2011 NORCECA Championship "Best Digger"
- 2011 NORCECA Championship "Best Receiver"
- 2011 Pan American Games "Best Libero"
- 2011 Pan American Games "Best Digger"
- 2011 Pan American Games "Best Receiver"
- 2012 Summer Olympics NORCECA qualification tournament's "Best Receiver"
- 2012 Summer Olympics NORCECA qualification tournament's "Best Libero"
- 2012 Pan-American Cup "Best Receiver"
- 2012 Pan-American Cup "Best Digger"
- 2012 Pan-American Cup "Best Libero"
- 2012 Summer Olympics "Best Libero"
- 2012 U23 Pan-American Cup "Best Digger"
- 2012 Dominican Republic "Volleyball Player of the Year"
- 2012–13 Azerbaijan Super League "Best Libero"
- 2013 NORCECA Championship "Best Digger"
- 2013 U23 World Championship "Best Libero"
- 2013–14 CEV Champions League "Best Libero"
- 2013–14 Azerbaijan Super League "Best Libero"
- 2014 Pan-American Cup "Most Valuable Player"
- 2014 Pan-American Cup "Best Libero"
- 2014 Pan-American Cup "Best Receiver"
- 2014 Pan-American Cup "Best Digger"
- 2014 Central American and Caribbean Games "Most Valuable Player"
- 2014 Central American and Caribbean Games "Best Libero"
- 2014 Central American and Caribbean Games Receiver"
- 2014 Central American and Caribbean Games "Best Digger"
- 2014–15 Azerbaijan Super League "Best Libero"
- 2014–15 Azerbaijan Super League "Best Digger"
- 2015 NORCECA Champions Cup "Best Digger"
- 2015 Pan-American Cup "Best Libero"
- 2015 Pan-American Cup "Best Digger"
- 2015 Pan-American Cup "Best Receiver"
- 2015 FIVB World Cup "Best Libero"
- 2015 NORCECA Championship "Best Libero"
- 2015 NORCECA Championship "Best Digger"
- 2015–16 Azerbaijan Super League "Best Digger"
- 2016 World Olympic qualification tournament "Best Libero"
- 2016–17 Brazilian Super League "Best Digger"
- 2016 Pan-American Cup "Best Libero"
- 2016 Pan-American Cup "Best Digger"
- 2016 Pan-American Cup "Best Receiver"
- 2018 Dominican Republic Superior Volleyball League "Best Libero"
- 2018 Dominican Republic Superior Volleyball League "Best Digger"
- 2018 Dominican Republic Superior Volleyball League "Best Receiver"
- 2018 Central American and Caribbean Games "Best Libero"
- 2018 Central American and Caribbean Games "Best Digger"
- 2021 Pan-American Cup "Best Receiver"
- 2021 Pan-American Cup "Best Digger"
- 2021 Pan-American Cup "Best Libero"
- 2026 Central American and Caribbean Games "Best libero"
- 2026 Central American and Caribbean Games "Best receiver"
- 2026 Central American and Caribbean Games "Best digger"

=== National team ===
==== Junior team ====
- 2008 NORCECA Women´s Junior Continental Championship U-20 – Silver Medal
- 2009 FIVB U20 Volleyball World Championship – Silver Medal
- 2010 NORCECA Women´s Junior Continental Championship U-20 – Silver Medal
- 2012 U23 Pan-American Cup – Gold Medal
- 2013 U23 World Championship – Silver Medal

=== Clubs ===
- 2008 Dominican Republic Volleyball League – Runner-Up, with San Cristóbal
- 2011 Puerto Rican League – Champion, with Criollas de Caguas
- 2012–13 CEV Champions League – Runner-Up, with Rabita Baku
- 2012–13 Azerbaijan Super League – Champion, with Rabita Baku
- 2013–14 CEV Champions League – Bronze medal, with Rabita Baku
- 2013–14 Azerbaijan Super League – Champion, with Rabita Baku
- 2014–15 Azerbaijan Super League – Champion, with Rabita Baku
- 2015–16 Azerbaijan Super League – Bronze medal, with Lokomotiv Baku
- 2021–22 CEV Challenge Cup – Champion, with Savino del Bene Scandicci
- 2022–23 CEV Cup – Champion, with Savino del Bene Scandicci
- 2023–24 Italian Cup – Runner-Up, with Vero Volley Milano
- 2023–24 CEV Champions League – Runner-Up, with Vero Volley Milano
- 2025 FIVB Club World Championship – Gold medal, with Savino del Bene Scandicci

=== Beach Volleyball ===
- 2009 Hato Mayor Beach Volleyball Tournament Gold Medal
