= Vilmarie Mojica =

Puerto Rican volleyball player (born 1985)

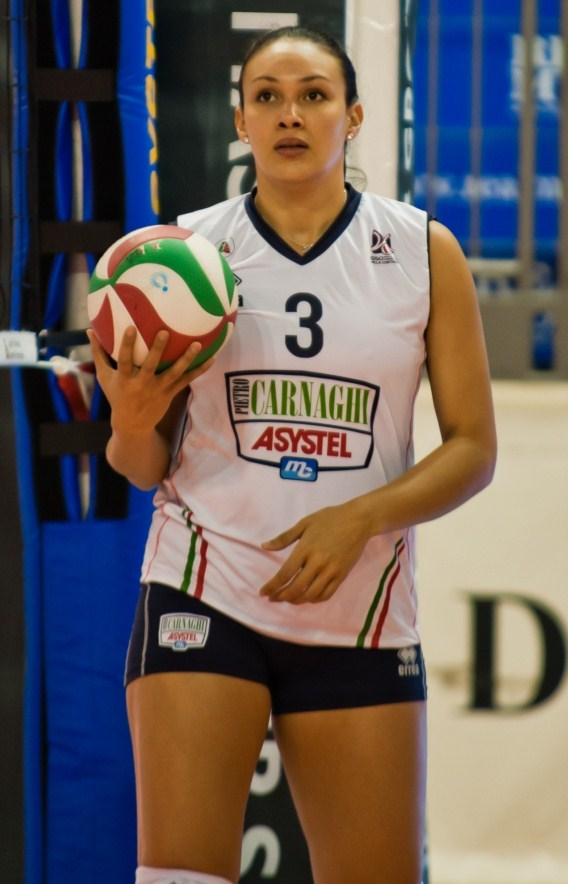

Personal information
- Nationality: Puerto Rican
- Born: August 13, 1985 (age 41); Toa Baja, Puerto Rico
- Height: 1.80 m (5 ft 11 in)

Volleyball information
- Position: Setter

National team
2002–2016	Puerto Rico
Medal record
Women's volleyball
Representing Puerto Rico
NORCECA Championship
Silver medal – second place	2009 Bayamón	Team
Central American and Caribbean Games
Silver medal – second place	2010 Mayagüez	Team
Silver medal – second place	2014 Veracruz	Team
Bronze medal – third place	2006 Cartagena	Team
Pan-American Cup
Bronze medal – third place	2009 Miami	Team

Vilmarie Mojica (born August 13, 1985, in Toa Baja, Puerto Rico) is a volleyball player from Puerto Rico, who captained the Women's National Team at the 2008 Olympic Qualification Tournament in Japan. There the team ended up in eighth and last place, having received a wild card for the event after Peru and Kenya withdrew.

== Career ==
She participated at the 2002 FIVB Volleyball Women's World Championship in Germany. Mojica was named Best Setter at the 2007 NORCECA Championship, where her team finished in fifth place in final rankings. She participated at the 2010 FIVB Volleyball Women's World Championship.

== Awards ==
=== Individuals ===
- 2007 NORCECA Championship "Best Setter"
- 2009 Pan-American Cup "Best Setter"
- 2009 NORCECA Championship "Best Setter"
- 2012 Summer Olympics NORCECA qualification tournament's "Best Setter"
