= Yanelis Santos =

Cuban volleyball player (born 1986)

Personal information
- Full name: Yanelis Santos Allegne
- Born: March 30, 1986 (age 40) Ciego de Ávila, Cuba
- Home town: Zürich, Switzerland
- Height: 1.81 m (5 ft 11 in)
- Weight: 71 kg (157 lb)
- Spike: 324 cm (128 in)
- Block: 312 cm (123 in)

Volleyball information
- Position: Setter / Opposite
- Current club: İlbank Ankara
- Number: 2 (national team)

National team
- Years: Team
- 2002–2012: Cuba
Honours
Women's volleyball
Representing Cuba
FIVB World Grand Prix
Silver medal – second place	2008 Yokohama	Team
Pan American Games
Gold medal – first place	2007 Rio de Janeiro	Team
Silver medal – second place	2003 Santo Domingo	Team
Silver medal – second place	2011 Guadalajara	Team
NORCECA Championship
Gold medal – first place	2007 Winnipeg	Team
Bronze medal – third place	2009 Bayamón	Team
Bronze medal – third place	2011 Caguas	Team
Pan-American Cup
Gold medal – first place	2007 Colima	Team
Central American and Caribbean Games
Silver medal – second place	2006 Cartagena	Team
- Updated on September 2015

Yanelis Santos Allegne (born 30 March 1986, in Ciego de Ávila) is a volleyball player from Cuba who played for the Cuban women's national team as a setter and opposite. Santos was named "Best Server" at the 2007 FIVB World Cup and the 2008 Summer Olympics.

== Career ==
=== National team ===
Santos started playing volleyball as a twelve year old in 1998, then joined the Cuban national team in 2001.

Santos played with her national team at the 2008 Summer Olympics. Even though they had previously defeated the US 3-0, this time they lost 0–3, falling to their nerves and own mistakes. They lost the bronze medal match to China, 1–3. Santos was named the tournament's "Best Server".

Santos led the Cuban national team to the silver medal during the 2011 Montreux Volley Masters. She won with her national team the silver medal at the 2011 Pan American Games held in Guadalajara, Mexico. She also won the bronze medal and the Best Spiker award at the 2011 NORCECA Championship.

In the 2012 Pan-American Cup held in Ciudad Juarez, Mexico, Santos won the "Best Spiker" and "Best Server" awards, as well as the bronze medal with her national team.

Santos held the fastest female spike record, measured at 103 km/h (64 mph).

Santos was awarded 2012 Female Athlete of the Year in a team sport by the Institute of Sports, Physical Education and Recreation (INDER) and the Union of Cuban Journalists' Sports Writers Circle.

=== Club volleyball ===
Santos signed with Voléro Zürich, moved to Switzerland, and later was transferred on loan to the Russian club Leningradka Saint Petersburg for the 2014–15 season. She later signed for the Turkish İlbank Ankara for the 2015–16 season.

=== Olympics ===
Santos placed fourth in volleyball at the 2008 Summer Olympics as part of the Cuba national team.

== Awards ==
=== Individual ===
- 2007 FIVB World Cup "Best Server"
- 2007 Montreux Volley Masters "Best Server"
- 2008 Final Four Cup "Best Server"
- 2008 Summer Olympics "Best Server"
- 2009 NORCECA Championship "Best Server"
- 2011 NORCECA Championship "Best Spiker"
- 2012 Summer Olympics NORCECA qualification tournament's "Best Server"
- 2012 Pan-American Cup "Best Spiker"
- 2012 Pan-American Cup "Best Server"
