= Shara Venegas =

Puerto Rican volleyball player (born 1992)

Personal information
- Nationality: Puerto Rico
- Born: 18 September 1992 (age 34); Toa Baja, Puerto Rico
- Height: 1.73 m (5 ft 8 in)
- Weight: 68 kg (150 lb)
- Spike: 280 cm (110 in)
- Block: 272 cm (107 in)

Volleyball information
- Current club: San Diego Mojo
- Number: 2
Honours
Women's volleyball
Representing Puerto Rico
FIVB Challenger Cup
Silver medal – second place	2024 Manila
Pan-American Cup
Bronze medal – third place	2017 Cañete
Central American and Caribbean Games
Bronze medal – third place	2026 Santo Domingo	Team

Shara Venegas (born September 18, 1992) is a Puerto Rican volleyball player who plays for the San Diego Mojo of the Pro Volleyball Federation. She is a member of the Puerto Rico women's national volleyball team and played for Criollas de Caguas in 2014. Venegas made her debut with the national team at the 2009 Women's NORCECA Volleyball Championship that was held in Bayamón, Puerto Rico. She was part of the Puerto Rican National Team at the 2014 FIVB Volleyball Women's World Championship in Italy. Venegas won the bronze medal at the 2026 Central American and Caribbean Games with her national team.

== Clubs ==
- (Puerto Rico) Llaneras de Toa Baja (2009–2011)
- (Puerto Rico) Pinkin de Corozal (2012)
- (Puerto Rico) Criollas de Caguas (2013–2017)
- (Brazil) Vôlei Bauru (2017–2018)
- (Ukraine) Prometey Club (2020–2021)
- (United States) San Diego Mojo (2024–present)
