= Volleyball at the 2026 Central American and Caribbean Games =

- Venue: Malecón Deportivo (beach); Pabellón Ricardo Gioriver Arias (indoor)
- Location: Santo Domingo, Dominican Republic
- Dates: 25 July–7 August

The volleyball competition at the 2026 Central American and Caribbean Games was held in Santo Domingo, Dominican Republic, from 25 July to 7 August 2026 at Malecón Deportivo for beach volleyball and Pabellón Ricardo Gioriver Arias for indoor volleyball.

== Medal table ==
* Host nation (Dominican Republic)

| Rank | Nation | Gold | Silver | Bronze | Total |
|---|---|---|---|---|---|
| 1 | Puerto Rico (PUR) | 1 | 1 | 2 | 4 |
| 2 | Cuba (CUB) | 1 | 1 | 1 | 3 |
| 3 | Colombia (COL) | 1 | 1 | 0 | 2 |
| 4 | Dominican Republic (DOM)* | 1 | 0 | 0 | 1 |
| 5 | Mexico (MEX) | 0 | 1 | 1 | 2 |
| Totals (5 entries) | | 4 | 4 | 4 | 12 |

== Medal summary ==
=== Beach volleyball ===
| Event | Gold | Silver | Bronze |
|---|---|---|---|
| Men | Cuba; Damián Gómez; Eblis Veranes | Mexico; Carlos Ayala; Antonio Vargas | Puerto Rico; Daniel Rivera; William Figueroa |
| Women | Puerto Rico; María González; Allanis Navas | Cuba; Maykelin Cardona; Kailin Garrido | Mexico; Abril Flores; Susana Torres |

=== Indoor volleyball ===
| Event | Gold | Silver | Bronze |
|---|---|---|---|
| Men | Colombia; Luis Cuenú; Leandro Ararat Mejía; Miguel Angel Amaranto Martinez; Samuel Jaramillo; Juan Benavides; Andrés Piza; Daniel Aponzá; Juan Ambuila; Maicol Ortiz; Santiago Ruiz; Roosvuelt Ramos; Heider Banguera | Puerto Rico; Ismael Alomar; Jair Santiago; Howard García; Axel Meléndez; Eliel Salva; Pelegrin Vargas; Dennis Del Valle; Pedro Molina; Arnel Cabrera; Klistan Lawrence; Jonathan Rodríguez; Kevin Rodríguez | Cuba; Daniel Martínez; Víctor Andreu; Miguel Ángel López; Ronaldo Flaquet; Thiago Suárez; Alejandro González; Julio Gómez; Alexis Wilson; Yonder García; Roamy Alonso; Marlon Yant; Julio César Cárdenas |
| Women | Dominican Republic; Camila de la Rosa; Cándida Arias; Flormarie Heredia; Geraldine González; Yaneirys Rodríguez; Yonkaira Peña; Alondra Tapia; Brenda Castillo; Brayelin Martínez; Jineiry Martínez; Gaila González; Niverka Marte | Colombia; Ivone Daniela Montaño; Juliana Toro; Katherin Ramírez; Dayana Segovia; Karen Rentería; Melissa Rangel; María Alejandra Marín; Doris González; Laura Pascua; Valerín Carabalí; Isabella Arroyave; Ana Karina Olaya | Puerto Rico; Diana Reyes; Dariana Hollingsworth; Paola Santiago; Jennifer Nogueras; Shara Venegas; Valeria Vázquez; Decelise Champion; Ana Sofia Jusino; Adriana Rodríguez; Wilmarie Rivera; Nataly García; Leandra Mangual |
