= Costa Rica women's national volleyball team =

National sports team

Costa Rica
- Association: Federación Costarricense de Voleibol
- Confederation: NORCECA
- Head coach: Braulio Godínez Blanco
- FIVB ranking: 61 ▼1 (24 May 2026)

Uniforms
Home	Away

The Costa Rica women's national volleyball team represents Costa Rica in international women's volleyball competitions and friendly matches.

At the Women's NORCECA Volleyball Championship, Costa Rica usually competes for places 5-8. In 2013, then head coach Horacio Bastit stated that a better finish was not yet realistic. He stated that beating teams such as the US, Canada, Puerto Rico or the Dominican Republic can remain as goals for the future.

== Results ==
=== FIVB Volleyball Women's World Championship ===
- 2006 — 17th place
- 2010 — 17th place

=== NORCECA Championship ===
- 1999 — 7th place
- 2001 — 5th place
- 2003 — 6th place
- 2005 — Did not participate
- 2007 — 7th place
- 2009 — 7th place
- 2011 — 8th place
- 2013 — 8th place
- 2015 — 8th place
- 2017 — 7th place
- 2019 — 7th place
- 2021 — 6th place
- 2023 — 7th place
- 2026 — 7th place

=== Pan-American Cup ===
- 2009 — 8th place
- 2010 — 11th place
- 2011 — 11th place
- 2012 — 9th place
- 2013 — 11th place
- 2014 — 10th place
- 2015 — 11th place
- 2016 — 12th place
- 2017 — Did not participate
- 2018 — 12th place
- 2019 — Did not participate
- 2021 — Did not participate
- 2022 — 8th place
- 2023 — 10th place

== 2009 Pan-American Cup Roster ==
- Head Coach: Braulio Godínez

#	Name	Date of Birth	Height	Weight	Spike	Block
1	Dionisia Thompson
2	Tatiana Murillo
5	Karen Cope
6	Ángela Willis
7	Mariela Quesada
8	Susana Chávez González
9	Verania Willis (c)
10	Paola Ramírez
11	Onikca Pinnock
13	Melissa Fernández Monge
14	Irene Fonseca
16	Mijal Hines Cuza
17	Marianela Alfaro
