= Mexico women's national volleyball team =

Women's national volleyball team representing Mexico

Mexico
- Association: Federación Mexicana de Voleibol
- Confederation: NORCECA
- Head coach: Nicola Negro
- FIVB ranking: 19 (24 May 2026)

Uniforms
Home	Away

World Championship
- Appearances: 9 (First in 1970)
- Best result: 10th place (1974)
Honours
Pan American Games
Gold medal – first place	1955 Mexico City	Team
Pan-American Cup
Silver medal – second place	2021 Santo Domingo	Team

The Mexico women's national volleyball team participates in international volleyball competitions.

== Results ==
=== World Championship ===
- 1970 — 12th place
- 1974 — 10th place
- 1978 — 15th place
- 1982 — 13th place
- 1986 — did not qualify
- 1990 — did not qualify
- 1994 — did not qualify
- 1998 — did not qualify
- 2002 — 21st place
- 2006 — 21st place
- 2010 — did not qualify
- 2014 — 21st place
- 2018 — 16th place
- 2022 — did not qualify
- 2025 — 24th place

=== Challenger Cup ===
- 2018 — did not qualify
- 2019 — did not qualify
- 2022 — did not qualify
- 2023 — 5th place
- 2024 — did not qualify

=== Pan American Games ===
- 1955 — Gold Medal
- 1959 — did not participate
- 1963 — 3rd place
- 1967 — 5th place
- 1971 — 3rd place
- 1975 — 3rd place
- 1979 — 5th place
- 1983 — did not participate
- 1987 — did not participate
- 1991 — did not participate
- 1995 — did not participate
- 1999 — did not participate
- 2003 — 8th place
- 2007 — 7th place
- 2011 — 8th place
- 2015 — did not participate
- 2019 — did not participate
- 2023 — 3rd place

=== Pan-American Cup ===
- 2002 — 4th place
- 2003 — 8th place
- 2004 — 7th place
- 2005 — 7th place
- 2006 — 9th place
- 2007 — 10th place
- 2008 — 10th place
- 2009 — 9th place
- 2010 — 9th place
- 2011 — 9th place
- 2012 — 12th place
- 2013 — 12th place
- 2014 — 8th place
- 2015 — 10th place
- 2016 — 11th place
- 2017 — 11th place
- 2018 — 10th place
- 2019 — 9th place
- 2021 — Silver medal
- 2022 — 4th place
- 2023 — 7th place
- 2024 — 5th place
- 2025 — 4th place

=== NORCECA Championship ===
- 1969 — Gold Medal
- 1971 — Gold Medal
- 1973 — 4th place
- 1975 — Bronze Medal
- 1977 — 6th place
- 1979 — Bronze Medal
- 1981 — Bronze Medal
- 1983 — 4th place
- 1985 — did not compete
- 1987 — 4th place
- 1989 — 4th place
- 1991 — 4th place
- 1993 — 4th place
- 1995 — 5th place
- 1997 — 6th place
- 1999 — 6th place
- 2001 — 4th place
- 2003 — did not compete
- 2005 — 7th place
- 2007 — 6th place
- 2009 — 6th place
- 2011 — 5th place
- 2013 — 5th place
- 2015 — 6th place
- 2019 — 5th place
- 2021 — 5th place
- 2023 — 5th place
- 2026 — 6th place

=== Final Four Cup ===
- 2008 — did not participate
- 2009 — did not participate
- 2010 — 4th place
- 2022 — Gold Medal
- 2023 — did not participate
- 2024 — Silver medal
- 2025 — Silver medal

== Current squad ==
The following is the Mexican roster in the 2025 FIVB Women's Volleyball World Championship.

Head coach: (Italy) Nicola Negro

No.	Name	Date of birth	Position	Height	Club
1	Uxue Guereca	12 February 2001	Outside Hitter	1.76 m (5 ft 9 in)	(Poland) UNI Opole
2	Samantha Bricio	22 November 1994	Outside Hitter	1.88 m (6 ft 2 in)	(Turkey) İller Bankası women's volleyball
3	Sofía Maldonado	6 February 2002	Opposite	1.78 m (5 ft 10 in)	(United States) Dallas Pro Volleyball
6	Grecia Castro	5 March 2001	Outside Hitter	1.80 m (5 ft 11 in)	(Spain) Avarca de Menorca
7	Argentina Ung	25 April 2002	Setter	1.81 m (5 ft 11 in)	(United States) LOVB Madison
10	Arleth Márquez	26 December 2005	Middle Blocker	1.94 m (6 ft 4 in)	(Mexico) Juanio's Guasave
11	Jocelyn Urías (c)	16 February 1996	Middle Blocker	1.90 m (6 ft 3 in)	(Romania) CSM Lugoj
12	Joseline Landeros	20 December 2000	Libero	1.69 m (5 ft 7 in)	(Azerbaijan) Turan Volleyball Club
14	Ximena Solar	3 January 2004	Middle Blocker	1.85 m (6 ft 1 in)	(Mexico) ITESM Monterrey
15	Paola Rivera	29 June 1990	Setter	1.74 m (5 ft 9 in)	(Peru) CV Universidad de San Martín de Porres
16	Paulett Muñoz	10 January 2000	Libero	1.78 m (5 ft 10 in)	(Mexico) Tigres UANL
20	Aime Topete	16 October 2005	Outside Hitter	1.78 m (5 ft 10 in)	(France) Vandœuvre Nancy
23	Melanie Parra	12 September 2002	Outside Hitter	1.78 m (5 ft 10 in)	(Italy) UYBA Volley
33	Angélica Karina Flores	16 August 1998	Middle Blocker	1.94 m (6 ft 4 in)	(Romania) CSM București (women's volleyball)

== See also ==
- Mexico women's national under-20 volleyball team
- Mexico women's national under-18 volleyball team
