= 1999 Women's NORCECA Volleyball Championship =

The 1999 Women's NORCECA Volleyball Championship was the 16th edition of the Women's Continental Volleyball Tournament, played by eight countries from September 21 to September 26, 1999, in Monterrey, Mexico.

== Competing nations ==
Group A	Group B
Costa Rica; Cuba; Puerto Rico; United States	Barbados; Canada; Dominican Republic; Mexico

== Preliminary round ==
=== Group A ===
	Team	Points	G	W	L	PW	PL	Ratio	SW	SL	Ratio
1.	Cuba	6	3	3	0				9	0	MAX
2.	United States	5	3	2	1				6	3	2.000
3.	Puerto Rico	4	3	1	2				3	7	0.428
4.	Costa Rica	3	3	0	3				1	9	0.111

- September 21

Cuba	3 – 0	Costa Rica	25-10 25-16 25-19
United States	3 – 0	Puerto Rico	25-10 25-17 25-15

- September 22

United States	3 – 0	Costa Rica	25-11 25-10 25-11
Cuba	3 – 0	Puerto Rico	25-09 25-17 25-22

- September 23

Cuba	3 – 0	United States	25-21 25-17 25-21
Puerto Rico	3 – 1	Costa Rica	22-25 25-19 25-14 25-13

=== Group B ===
	Team	Points	G	W	L	PW	PL	Ratio	SW	SL	Ratio
1.	Dominican R.	6	3	3	0				9	2	4.500
2.	Canada	5	3	2	1				7	3	2.333
3.	Mexico	4	3	1	2				4	6	0.666
4.	Barbados	3	3	0	3				0	9	0.000

- September 21

Dominican R.	3 – 1	Canada	20-25 25-19 25-21 25-22
Mexico	3 – 0	Barbados	25-17 25-14 25-20

- September 22

Dominican R.	3 – 0	Barbados	25-10 25-22 25-20
Canada	3 – 0	Mexico	25-12 25-19 25-16

- September 23

Canada	3 – 0	Barbados	25-08 25-10 25-10
Dominican R.	3 – 1	Mexico	25-10 22-25 25-10 25-20

== Final round ==
Semi-finals
1999-09-25 – Monterrey
United States	3
Dominican Republic	0
1999-09-25 – Monterrey
Cuba	3
Canada	0

Final
1999-09-26 – Monterrey
United States	0
Cuba	3
3rd place
1999-09-26 – Monterrey
Dominican Republic	1
Canada	3

=== Quarter-finals ===
- September 24

United States	3 – 0	Mexico	25-17 25-13 25-18
Canada	3 – 1	Puerto Rico	23-25 25-22 25-19 25-22

=== Semi-finals ===
- September 25

United States	3 – 0	Dominican R.	25-17 25-13 25-18
Cuba	3 – 0	Canada	25-16 25-13 25-17

=== Finals ===
- September 24 — Seventh Place Match

Costa Rica	3 – 0	Barbados	25-21 25-22 25-18

- September 26 — Fifth Place Match

Puerto Rico	3 – 0	Mexico	25-14 25-15 25-19

- September 26 — Bronze Medal Match

Canada	3 – 1	Dominican R.	25-21 25-19 19-25 35-33

- September 26 — Gold Medal Match

Cuba	3 – 0	United States	25-14 25-15 25-19

== Final ranking ==
Place	Team
1st place, gold medalist(s)	Cuba
2nd place, silver medalist(s)	United States
3rd place, bronze medalist(s)	Canada
4.	Dominican Republic
5.	Puerto Rico
6.	Mexico
7.	Costa Rica
8.	Barbados

1999 Women's NORCECA winners

Cuba
Twelfth title

== Individual awards ==
Most Valuable Player: (Cuba) Mireya Luis
