= Geraldine González (volleyball) =

Dominican Republic volleyball player (born 2002)

Personal information
- Full name: Geraldine Sthefany González
- Nationality: Dominican
- Born: 18 April 2002 (age 24); Bajos de Haina, San Cristóbal
- Height: 2.00 m (6 ft 7 in)
- Weight: 77 kg (170 lb)
- Spike: 295 cm (116 in)
- Block: 290 cm (114 in)

Volleyball information
- Position: Middle blocker

National team
2022–	Dominican Republic
Honours
Women's volleyball
Representing the Dominican Republic
Pan-American Cup
Gold medal – first place	2025 Colima	Team
Central American and Caribbean Games
Gold medal – first place	2026 Santo Domingo	Team

Geraldine Sthefany González (born 18 April 2002 in Haina) is a Dominican Republic volleyball player who played the 2024 Summer Olympics.

== Career ==
=== 2024 ===
She was part of the Dominican Republic national team that finished eight, losing 0–3 to Brazil in the quarterfinals of the 2024 Summer Olympics.

=== 2026 ===
González helped win the gold medal at the 2026 Central American and Caribbean Games, the seventh consecutive for her home country. She was awarded tournament's Best Blocker.

== Awards ==
=== Individuals ===
- 2026 Central American and Caribbean Games "Best blocker"
