= 2014 Women's Pan-American Volleyball Cup =

Tournament details
- Host country: Mexico
- Dates: 11–19 June
- Teams: 12
- Venues: 2 (in Mexico City host cities)

Final positions
- Champions: Dominican Republic (3rd title)

Tournament awards
- MVP: Brenda Castillo (DOM)

The 2014 Pan-American Volleyball Cup was the thirteenth edition of the annual women's volleyball tournament, played by twelve countries over June, 2014 in Mexico City, Mexico.

The Dominican Republic defeated 3–1 to the United States to win their third competition's gold medal. Among the NORCECA, the USA team was already qualified to the FIVB World Grand Prix as wild cards, while the Dominican Republic qualified to the 2015 group I, Puerto Rico, Cuba and Canada to the group II and Mexico will play the 2015 FIVB World Grand Prix group III. Brazil as wild card was already qualified to the group I while Argentina qualified to the group II and Colombia will play the group III.

== Competing nations ==
Group A	Group B
Canada; Cuba; Dominican Republic; Mexico; Peru; Trinidad and Tobago	Argentina; Colombia; Costa Rica; Puerto Rico; United States; ~~Brazil~~ *

* Brazil withdrew from the competition two days before the start. Their matches were not removed from the competition; rather they were not played and were considered null games.

== Pool standing procedure ==
Match ending 3–0: 5 points for the winner, 0 point for the loser
Match ending 3–1: 4 points for the winner, 1 points for the loser
Match ending 3–2: 3 points for the winner, 2 points for the loser
In case of tie, the teams will be classified according to the following criteria:
points ratio (first criteria) and sets ratio (second criteria)

== Preliminary round ==
Team advances to semifinals
Team advances to quarterfinals

=== Group A ===
Pos	Team	Pld	W	L	Pts	SPW	SPL	SPR	SW	SL	SR	Qualification
1	Dominican Republic	5	5	0	22	419	330	1.270	15	3	5.000	Semifinals
2	Canada	5	3	2	16	417	385	1.083	11	7	1.571	Quarterfinals
3	Cuba	5	3	2	15	399	370	1.078	10	7	1.429	Quarterfinals
4	Mexico	5	3	2	9	427	462	0.924	9	12	0.750	
5	Peru	5	1	4	10	444	455	0.976	8	12	0.667	
6	Trinidad and Tobago	5	0	5	3	332	427	0.778	3	15	0.200	

Note: Mexico finished with a 3–2 record and 9 points and placed fourth behind Cuba (3–2, 15 points) and in front of Peru (1–4, 10 points).

Date	Time		Score		Set 1	Set 2	Set 3	Set 4	Set 5	Total	Report
11 June	15:00	Canada	3–1	Peru	25–18	26–24	23–25	25–20		99–87	P2P3
11 June	17:00	Trinidad and Tobago	0–3	Dominican Republic	12–25	11–25	16–25			39–75	P2P3
11 June	19:00	Mexico	0–3	Cuba	19–25	17–25	21–25			57–75	P2P3
12 June	15:00	Dominican Republic	3–1	Cuba	24–26	25–17	25–21	25–19		99–83	P2P3
12 June	17:00	Canada	3–0	Trinidad and Tobago	25–23	25–14	26–24			76–61	P2P3
12 June	19:00	Mexico	3–2	Peru	25–23	16–25	28–26	21–25	15–11	105–110	P2P3
13 June	15:00	Trinidad and Tobago	0–3	Peru	24–26	21–25	24–26			69–77	P2P3
13 June	17:00	Cuba	0–3	Canada	22–25	23–25	21–25			66–75	P2P3
13 June	19:00	Dominican Republic	3–0	Mexico	25–23	25–20	25–22			75–65	P2P3
14 June	15:00	Trinidad and Tobago	1–3	Cuba	17–25	18–25	25–20	10–25		70–95	P2P3
14 June	17:00	Peru	2–3	Dominican Republic	18–25	21–25	25–22	25–18	12–15	101–105	P2P3
14 June	19:00	Mexico	3–2	Canada	27–25	27–25	13–25	14–25	15–9	96–109	P2P3
15 June	15:00	Dominican Republic	3–0	Canada	25–22	25–14	25–22			75–58	P2P3
15 June	17:00	Peru	0–3	Cuba	26–28	25–27	18–25			69–80	P2P3
15 June	19:00	Mexico	3–2	Trinidad and Tobago	18–25	21–25	25–15	25–20	15–8	104–93	P2P3

=== Group B ===
Pos	Team	Pld	W	L	Pts	SPW	SPL	SPR	SW	SL	SR	Qualification
1	United States	4	4	0	20	305	201	1.517	12	0	MAX	Semifinals
2	Argentina	4	3	1	15	286	243	1.177	9	3	3.000	Quarterfinals
3	Puerto Rico	4	2	2	10	266	262	1.015	6	6	1.000	Quarterfinals
4	Colombia	4	1	3	5	264	290	0.910	3	9	0.333	
5	Costa Rica	4	0	4	0	175	300	0.583	0	12	0.000	

Date	Time		Score		Set 1	Set 2	Set 3	Set 4	Set 5	Total	Report
11 June	17:00	Colombia	0–3	United States	19–25	19–25	28–30			66–80	P2P3
11 June	19:00	Argentina	3–0	Puerto Rico	25–14	25–22	28–26			78–62	P2P3
12 June	15:00	Puerto Rico	3–0	Costa Rica	25–15	25–11	25–19			75–45	P2P3
12 June	19:00	United States	3–0	Argentina	25–20	25–14	25–20			75–54	P2P3
13 June	15:00	Puerto Rico	0–3	United States	18–25	13–25	17–25			48–75	P2P3
13 June	17:00	Costa Rica	0–3	Colombia	16–25	18–25	16–25			50–75	P2P3
14 June	15:00	Colombia	0–3	Argentina	27–29	17–25	15–25			59–79	P2P3
14 June	19:00	Costa Rica	0–3	United States	13–25	9–25	11–25			33–75	P2P3
15 June	15:00	Puerto Rico	3–0	Colombia	25–13	25–22	31–29			81–64	P2P3
15 June	17:00	Argentina	3–0	Costa Rica	25–18	25–12	25–17			75–47	P2P3

== Final round ==
=== Championship bracket ===
Quarterfinals
A2	Canada	0
B3	Puerto Rico	3
B2	Argentina	3
A3	Cuba	1

Semifinals
B1	United States	3
B3	Puerto Rico	0
A1	Dominican Republic	3
B2	Argentina	0

Finals
B1	United States	1
A1	Dominican Republic	3
Classification 3–4
B3	Puerto Rico	3
B2	Argentina	2

=== 7th to 10th places bracket ===
Classification 7–10
A4	Mexico	3
B5	Costa Rica	0
B4	Colombia	3
A5	Peru	0

Classification 7–8
A4	Mexico	2
B4	Colombia	3
Classification 9–10
B5	Costa Rica	1
A5	Peru	3

=== Classification 7–10 ===
Date	Time		Score		Set 1	Set 2	Set 3	Set 4	Set 5	Total	Report
17 June	17:00	Colombia	3–0	Peru	25–21	25–23	25–20			75–64	P2P3
17 June	19:00	Mexico	3–0	Costa Rica	25–10	25–22	25–17			75–49	P2P3

=== Quarterfinals ===
Date	Time		Score		Set 1	Set 2	Set 3	Set 4	Set 5	Total	Report
17 June	18:00	Canada	0–3	Puerto Rico	17–25	16–25	28–30			61–80	P2P3
17 June	20:00	Argentina	3–1	Cuba	25–23	23–25	25–20	25–19		98–87	P2P3

=== Classification 9–10 ===
Date	Time		Score		Set 1	Set 2	Set 3	Set 4	Set 5	Total	Report
18 June	18:00	Peru	3–1	Costa Rica	25–12	25–12	22–25	25–14		97–63	P2P3

=== Classification 7–8 ===
Date	Time		Score		Set 1	Set 2	Set 3	Set 4	Set 5	Total	Report
18 June	20:00	Colombia	3–2	Mexico	19–25	25–19	18–25	31–29	15–11	108–109	P2P3

=== Semifinals ===
Date	Time		Score		Set 1	Set 2	Set 3	Set 4	Set 5	Total	Report
18 June	18:00	United States	3–0	Puerto Rico	25–15	25–21	25–17			75–53	P2P3
18 June	20:00	Dominican Republic	3–0	Argentina	25–21	25–18	26–24			76–63	P2P3

=== Classification 5–6 ===
Date	Time		Score		Set 1	Set 2	Set 3	Set 4	Set 5	Total	Report
19 June	16:00	Canada	1–3	Cuba	24–26	25–23	21–25	16–25		86–99	P2P3

=== Classification 3–4 ===
Date	Time		Score		Set 1	Set 2	Set 3	Set 4	Set 5	Total	Report
19 June	18:00	Puerto Rico	3–2	Argentina	24–26	25–15	24–26	25–15	16–14	114–96	P2P3

=== Final ===
Date	Time		Score		Set 1	Set 2	Set 3	Set 4	Set 5	Total	Report
19 June	20:00	United States	1–3	Dominican Republic	18–25	18–25	25–17	21–25		82–92	P2P3

== Final standing ==
Rank	Team
1st place, gold medalist(s)	Dominican Republic
2nd place, silver medalist(s)	United States
3rd place, bronze medalist(s)	Puerto Rico
4	Argentina
5	Cuba
6	Canada
7	Colombia
8	Mexico
9	Peru
10	Costa Rica
11	Trinidad and Tobago

== Individual awards ==
- Most valuable player
  (Dominican Republic) Brenda Castillo
- Best setter
  (Colombia) María Marín
- Best Outside Hitters
  (Dominican Republic) Bethania de la Cruz
  (Colombia) Margarita Martínez
- Best Middle Blockers
  (Dominican Republic) Cándida Arias
  (United States) TeTori Dixon
- Best Opposite
  (Mexico) Andrea Rangel
- Best libero
  (Dominican Republic) Brenda Castillo
