= 2009 Women's Pan-American Volleyball Cup =

Volleyball tournament

Tournament details
- Host country: United States
- Dates: May 30 – June 7, 2009
- Teams: 11
- Venue(s): Florida International University, University of Miami (in Miami, Florida host cities)

Final positions
- Champions: Brazil (2nd title)

Tournament awards
- MVP: (Dominican Republic) Bethania de la Cruz

The 2009 Women's Pan-American Volleyball Cup was the eighth edition of the annual women's volleyball tournament, played by eleven countries from June 24 to July 5, 2009, in Miami, Florida. The intercontinental event served as a qualifier for the 2010 FIVB World Grand Prix.

== Competing nations ==
Group A — University of Miami	Group B — Florida International University
Costa Rica; Guatemala; Mexico; Peru; Puerto Rico; United States	Argentina; Brazil; Canada; Dominican Republic; Trinidad and Tobago

== Preliminary round ==
=== Group A ===
	Team	Points	G	W	L	PW	PL	Ratio	SW	SL	Ratio
1	United States	10	5	5	0	400	250	1.600	15	1	15.000
2	Puerto Rico	9	5	4	1	384	304	1.263	13	3	4.333
3	Peru	8	5	3	2	351	261	1.345	9	6	1.500
4	Costa Rica	7	5	2	3	264	346	0.763	6	9	0.667
5	Mexico	6	5	1	4	278	356	0.781	3	12	0.250
6	Guatemala	5	5	0	5	215	375	0.573	0	15	0.000

- Friday June 26, 2009

Puerto Rico	3–0	Guatemala	25–9, 25–15, 25–18
Peru	3–0	Mexico	25–13, 25–15, 25–10
United States	3–0	Costa Rica	25–7, 25–6, 25–16

- Saturday June 27, 2009

Costa Rica	0–3	Peru	14–25, 10–25, 11–25
Mexico	0–3	Puerto Rico	18–25, 15–25, 21–25
Guatemala	0–3	United States	7–25, 12–25, 7–25

- Sunday June 28, 2009

Costa Rica	3–0	Guatemala	25–16, 25–17, 25–21
Puerto Rico	3–0	Peru	25–17, 25–19, 25–23
United States	3–0	Mexico	25–19, 25–14, 25–11

- Monday June 29, 2009

Mexico	3–0	Guatemala	25–23, 25–12, 25–21
Costa Rica	0–3	Puerto Rico	21–25, 18–25, 11–25
Peru	0–3	United States	22–25, 21–25, 24–26

- Tuesday June 30, 2008

Guatemala	0–3	Peru	9–25, 13–25, 15–25
Mexico	0–3	Costa Rica	23–25, 22–25, 22–25
United States	3–1	Puerto Rico	25–15, 25–20, 24–26, 25–23

=== Group B ===
	Team	Points	G	W	L	PW	PL	Ratio	SW	SL	Ratio
1	Dominican Republic	8	4	4	0	376	302	1.245	12	4	3.000
2	Brazil	7	4	3	1	353	252	1.401	11	4	2.750
3	Argentina	6	4	2	2	335	304	1.102	8	7	1.143
4	Canada	5	4	1	3	275	325	0.846	5	9	0.556
5	Trinidad and Tobago	4	4	0	4	144	300	0.480	0	12	0.000

- Friday June 26, 2009

Dominican Republic	3–1	Argentina	24–26, 25–13, 25–18, 27–25
Brazil	3–0	Canada	25–11, 25–12, 25–13

- Saturday June 27, 2009

Argentina	3–0	Trinidad and Tobago	25–6, 25–15, 25–8
Canada	1–3	Dominican Republic	25–23, 17–25, 21–25, 21–25

- Sunday June 28, 2009

Trinidad and Tobago	0–3	Dominican Republic	6–25, 7–25, 14–25
Brazil	3–1	Argentina	26–24, 18–25, 25–13, 25–18

- Monday June 29, 2009

Trinidad and Tobago	0–3	Brazil	11–25, 14–25, 9–25
Argentina	3–1	Canada	25–16, 25–22, 23–25, 25–17

- Tuesday June 30, 2009

Canada	3–0	Trinidad and Tobago	25–21, 25–10, 25–23
Brazil	2–3	Dominican Republic	23–25, 25–19, 25–18, 23–25, 13–15

== Final round ==
Semi-finals
2009-07-03 – University of Miami, Miami, Florida
Dominican Republic	3
Puerto Rico	2
2009-07-03 – University of Miami, Miami, Florida
United States	1
Brazil	3

Final
2009-07-04 – University of Miami, Miami, Florida
Dominican Republic	0
Brazil	3
3rd place
2009-07-04 – University of Miami, Miami, Florida
Puerto Rico	3
United States	1

=== Classification 5–10 ===
- Thursday July 2, 2009

Canada	3–2	Mexico	23–25, 25–14, 25–17, 20–25, 15–12
Costa Rica	3–0	Trinidad and Tobago	25–16, 25–15, 25–18

=== Quarterfinals ===
- Thursday July 2, 2009

Brazil	3–0	Peru	25–11, 25–19, 25–14
Puerto Rico	3–1	Argentina	25–18, 17–25, 25–19, 25–19

=== Classification 9 ===
- Friday July 3, 2009

Mexico	3–2	Trinidad and Tobago	18–25, 25–15, 20–25, 25–23, 15–13

=== Classification 5–8 ===
- Friday July 3, 2009

Canada	1–3	Peru	27–29, 13–25, 25–16, 21–25
Costa Rica	0–3	Argentina	22–25, 22–25, 16–25

=== Semifinals ===
- Friday July 3, 2009

Dominican Republic	3–2	Puerto Rico	34–36, 22–25, 25–23, 25–21, 15–9
United States	1–3	Brazil	25–22, 22–25, 19–25, 14–25

=== Classification 10–11, 7–8, 5–6 ===
- Saturday July 4, 2009

Trinidad and Tobago	3–0	Guatemala	25–15, 25–16, 25–22
Canada	3–0	Costa Rica	25–20, 25–13, 25–19
Peru	3–2	Argentina	27–25, 25–20, 16–25, 19–25, 17–15

=== Finals ===
- Saturday July 4, 2009

Puerto Rico	3–1	United States	25–22, 20–25, 25–21, 25–20
Dominican Republic	0–3	Brazil	18–25, 20–25, 14–25

== Final ranking ==
Place	Team
1.	Brazil
2.	Dominican Republic
3.	Puerto Rico
4.	United States
5.	Peru
6.	Argentina
7.	Canada
8.	Costa Rica
9.	Mexico
10.	Trinidad and Tobago
11.	Guatemala

2009 Women's Pan-American Cup winners

Brazil
Second title

- Brazil, Dominican Republic, Puerto Rico and the United States qualified for the 2010 World Grand Prix

== Individual awards ==
- Most valuable player
  - Bethania de la Cruz (DOM)
- Best scorer
  - Áurea Cruz (PUR)
- Best spiker
  - Yulissa Zamudio (PER)
- Best blocker
  - Danielle Scott-Arruda (USA)
- Best server
  - Bethania de la Cruz (DOM)
- Best digger
  - Nicole Davis (USA)
- Best setter
  - Vilmarie Mojica (PUR)
- Best receiver
  - Vanessa Palacios (PER)
- Best libero
  - Vanessa Palacios (PER)
- Rising Star
  - Brenda Castillo (DOM)
