= 2008 Final Four Women's Volleyball Cup =

Sports tournament in Brazil

2008 Final Four Women’s Volleyball Cup

Tournament details
- Host country: Brazil
- Dates: September 3–7, 2008
- Teams: 4
- Venue: The City Sport Stadium (in Fortaleza host cities)

Final positions
- Champions: Brazil (1st title)

Tournament awards
- MVP: (Brazil) Hélia Souza

The 2008 Final Four Women’s Volleyball Cup was first edition of the annual women's volleyball tournament, played by four countries from September 3–7, 2008 in Fortaleza, Brazil.

== Competing nations ==
Group A

Argentina
Brazil
Cuba
Dominican Republic

== Preliminary round ==
	Team	Points	G	W	L	PW	PL	Ratio	SW	SL	Ratio
1	Brazil	6	3	3	0	240	175	1.371	9	1	9.000
2	Dominican Republic	5	3	2	1	250	217	1.152	7	4	1.750
3	Cuba	4	3	1	2	200	232	0.862	4	6	0.667
4	Argentina	3	3	0	3	159	225	0.707	0	9	0.000

- September 3, 2008

Cuba	1–3	Dominican Republic	16–25, 25–21, 24–26, 14–25
Brazil	3–0	Argentina	25–19, 25–15, 25–17

- September 4, 2008

Argentina	0–3	Cuba	20–25, 20–25, 20–25
Brazil	3–1	Dominican Republic	15–25, 25–19, 25–22, 25–12

- September 5, 2008

Argentina	0–3	Dominican Republic	12–25, 19–25, 17–25
Brazil	3–0	Cuba	25–18, 25–15, 25–13

== Final round ==
Semifinals
September 6, 2008 – Fortaleza
Dominican Republic	3
Cuba	0
September 6, 2008 – Fortaleza
Brazil	3
Argentina	0

Final
September 7, 2008 – Fortaleza
Dominican Republic	0
Brazil	3
3rd place
September 7, 2008 – Fortaleza
Cuba	1
Argentina	3

=== Semifinals ===
- September 6, 2008

Dominican Republic	3–0	Cuba	25–17, 25–18, 25–20
Brazil	3–0	Argentina	25–15, 25–12, 25–12

=== Finals ===
- September 7, 2008

Cuba	1–3	Argentina	24–26, 19–25, 25–16, 22–25
Dominican Republic	0–3	Brazil	21–25, 17–25, 18–25

== Final ranking ==
Place	Team
1.	Brazil
2.	Dominican Republic
3.	Argentina
4.	Cuba

2008 Final Four Women’s Volleyball Cup Winners

Brazil
First title

== Individual awards ==
- Most valuable player
  - Hélia Souza (BRA)
- Best scorer
  - Bethania de la Cruz (DOM)
- Best spiker
  - Bethania de la Cruz (DOM)
- Best blocker
  - Fabiana Claudino (BRA)
- Best server
  - Yanelis Santos (CUB)
- Best digger
  - Lucia Gaido (ARG)
- Best setter
  - Hélia Souza (BRA)
- Best receiver
  - Fabiana de Oliveira (BRA)
- Best libero
  - Fabiana de Oliveira (BRA)
- Rising Star
  - Brenda Castillo (DOM)
