= Women's NORCECA Volleyball Continental Championship =

North American continental women's volleyball tournament

Women's NORCECA Volleyball Championship
- Current season, competition or edition: 2026 Women's NORCECA Volleyball Championship
- Sport: Volleyball
- Founded: 1969
- No. of teams: 8 (Finals)
- Continent: North America, Central America and the Caribbean (NORCECA)
- Most recent champions: Canada (1st title)
- Most titles: Cuba (13 titles)

The NORCECA Women's Volleyball Championship is the official competition for senior women's national volleyball teams of North America, Central America and the Caribbean, organized by the North, Central America and Caribbean Volleyball Confederation (NORCECA). Since its introduction in 1969 the tournaments have been awarded every two years. The competition has been dominated by Cuba and United States, which won together 21 of the 27 editions of the tournament.

== History ==
Year	Host	Final			3rd place match			Teams
Year	Host	Champions	Score	Runners-up	3rd place	Score	4th place	Teams
1969; Details	Mexico City	Mexico	3–2	Cuba	United States	3–1	Canada	7
1971; Details	(Cuba); Havana	Mexico	Round-robin	Cuba	Netherlands Antilles	Round-robin	Puerto Rico	4
1973; Details	(Mexico); Tijuana	Cuba	3–0	Canada	United States	3–2	Mexico	7
1975; Details	(United States); Los Angeles	Cuba	Round-robin	United States	Mexico	Round-robin	Canada	5
1977; Details	(Dominican Republic); Santo Domingo	Cuba	3–1	United States	Canada	3–0	Dominican Republic	9
1979; Details	(Cuba); Havana	Cuba	Round-robin	United States	Mexico	Round-robin	Canada	7
1981; Details	Mexico City	United States	3–1	Cuba	Mexico	3–1	Canada	9
1983; Details	(United States); Indianapolis	United States	Round-robin	Cuba	Canada	Round-robin	Mexico	6
1985; Details	(Dominican Republic); Santiago de los Caballeros	Cuba	3–0	United States	Canada	3–?	Puerto Rico	10
1987; Details	(Cuba); Havana	Cuba	Round-robin	United States	Canada	Round-robin	Mexico	7
1989; Details	(Puerto Rico); San Juan	Cuba	3–0	Canada	United States	3–0	Mexico	11
1991; Details	(Canada); Regina	Cuba	Round-robin	United States	Canada	Round-robin	Mexico	7
1993; Details	(United States); Colorado	Cuba	3–1	United States	Canada	3–?	Mexico	6
1995; Details	(Dominican Republic); Santo Domingo	Cuba	3–1	United States	Canada	3–?	Dominican Republic	6
1997; Details	(Puerto Rico); Caguas	Cuba	3–1	United States	Dominican Republic	3–1	Canada	8
1999; Details	(Mexico); Monterrey	Cuba	3–0	United States	Canada	3–1	Dominican Republic	8
2001; Details	(Dominican Republic); Santo Domingo	United States	3–1	Cuba	Dominican Republic	3–1	Mexico	6
2003; Details	(Dominican Republic); Santo Domingo	United States	3–0	Cuba	Dominican Republic	3–0	Canada	7
2005; Details	(Trinidad and Tobago); Port of Spain	United States	3–2	Cuba	Dominican Republic	3–0	Puerto Rico	8
2007; Details	(Canada); Winnipeg	Cuba	3–2	United States	Dominican Republic	3–2	Canada	8
2009; Details	(Puerto Rico); Bayamón	Dominican Republic	3–2	Puerto Rico	Cuba	3–2	United States	8
2011; Details	(Puerto Rico); Caguas	United States	3–0	Dominican Republic	Cuba	3–0	Puerto Rico	9
2013; Details	(United States); Omaha	United States	3–1	Dominican Republic	Puerto Rico	3–0	Canada	9
2015; Details	(Mexico); Morelia	United States	3–1	Dominican Republic	Puerto Rico	3–1	Canada	8
2017; Details	(Note: The 2017 Women's NORCECA Volleyball Championship played from 26 September to 16 October 2017 in Canada, Dominican Republic and Trinidad and Tobago was a qualifying event for the 2018 FIVB Volleyball Women's World Championship.)							12
2019; Details	(Puerto Rico); San Juan	Dominican Republic	3–2	United States	Canada	3–0	Puerto Rico	8
2021; Details	(Mexico); Guadalajara	Dominican Republic	3–2	Puerto Rico	Canada	3–2	United States	7
2023; Details	(Canada); Quebec City	Dominican Republic	3–2	United States	Canada	3–1	Cuba	7
2026; Details	(Dominican Republic); Santo Domingo	Canada	3–2	United States	Cuba	3–0	Dominican Republic	8

== Medals summary ==
Rank	Nation	Gold	Silver	Bronze	Total
1	Cuba	13	7	3	23
2	United States	8	14	3	25
3	Dominican Republic	4	3	5	12
4	Mexico	2	0	3	5
5	Canada	1	2	11	14
6	Puerto Rico	0	2	2	4
7	Netherlands Antilles	0	0	1	1
Totals (7 entries)		28	28	28	84

== Most valuable player by edition ==
- 1969 – 1999 – Unknown
- 2001 – (United States) Tara Cross-Battle
- 2003 – (Cuba) Yumilka Ruíz
- 2005 – (United States) Nancy Metcalf
- 2007 – (Cuba) Nancy Carrillo
- 2009 – (Dominican Republic) Prisilla Rivera
- 2011 – (Dominican Republic) Bethania de la Cruz
- 2013 – (United States) Kelly Murphy
- 2015 – (United States) Nicole Fawcett
- 2019 – (Dominican Republic) Brayelin Martínez
- 2021 – (Dominican Republic) Gaila González
- 2023 – (Dominican Republic) Brenda Castillo
- 2026 – (Canada) Kacey Jost

== See also ==
- NORCECA Men's Volleyball Championship
- Women's Junior NORCECA Volleyball Championship
- Girls' Youth NORCECA Volleyball Championship
- Volleyball at the Pan American Games
- Women's Pan-American Volleyball Cup
- Volleyball at the Central American and Caribbean Games
