= Final Four Volleyball Cup =

The Final Four Volleyball Cup is a Bi-Continental Cup organized by the Pan-American Volleyball Union from 2008 to 2011, with the top two ranked teams from the NORCECA and CSV confederations at the Men's and Women's Pan-American Cup.

The women's competition run from 2008 to 2010, but has been dropped out of the NORCECA and PVU Calendar as of 2011. FIVB, however, has the competitions programmed until 2013.

== History ==
=== Men ===
Final Four Cup
Year	Host	Winner	Runner-up	3rd place	4th place
2013; Details	Monterrey, Mexico	Mexico	Dominican Republic	Venezuela	Canada

=== Women ===
Final Four Cup
Year	Host	Winner	Runner-up	3rd place	4th place
2008; Details	Fortaleza Brazil	Brazil	Dominican Republic	Argentina	Cuba
2009; Details	Lima, Peru	Brazil	United States	Dominican Republic	Peru
2010; Details	Chiapas, Mexico	Dominican Republic	Peru	Argentina	Mexico
2017; Details	Lima, Peru	(Brazil) Vôlei Nestlé Osasco	(Brazil) Minas Tênis Clube	Peru	(Brazil) Fluminense FC

== See also ==
- Men's Pan-American Volleyball Cup
- Women's Pan-American Volleyball Cup
