= 2010 Final Four Women's Volleyball Cup =

Tournament details
- Host country: Mexico
- Dates: September 21–25, 2010
- Teams: 4
- Venue: Polyforum Chiapas (in Chiapas host cities)

Final positions
- Champions: Dominican Republic (1st title)

Tournament awards
- MVP: (Dominican Republic) Dahiana Burgos

The 2010 Final Four Women's Volleyball Cup was the third edition of the annual women's volleyball tournament, played by four countries from September 21–25, 2010 in Tuxtla Gutiérrez, Chiapas, Mexico. The teams qualified through the 2010 Pan-American Cup, held in Rosarito and Tijuana, Mexico.

== Competing nations ==
Group A

Argentina
Dominican Republic
Mexico
Peru

== Preliminary round ==
Pos	Team	Pld	W	L	Pts	SW	SL	SR	SPW	SPL	SPR
1	Peru	3	3	0	6	9	1	9.000	251	161	1.559
2	Dominican Republic	3	2	1	5	6	4	1.500	224	213	1.052
3	Argentina	3	1	2	4	5	6	0.833	251	244	1.029
4	Mexico	3	0	3	3	0	9	0.000	116	225	0.516

Date		Score		Set 1	Set 2	Set 3	Set 4	Set 5	Total	Report
21 September	Dominican Republic	0–3	Peru	18–25	14–25	15–25			47–75	Report
21 September	Mexico	0–3	Argentina	10–25	10–25	21–25			41–75	Report
22 September	Argentina	1–3	Dominican Republic	23–25	27–25	22–25	25–27		97–102	Report
22 September	Peru	3–0	Mexico	25–12	25–16	25–7			75–35	Report
23 September	Argentina	1–3	Peru	28–26	16–25	14–25	21–25		79–101	Report
23 September	Dominican Republic	3–0	Mexico	25–18	25–18	25–8			75–41	Report

== Final round ==
Semi finals
2010-09-24 Chiapas
Peru	3
Mexico	0
2010-09-24 Chiapas
Dominican Republic	3
Argentina	0

Final
2010-09-25 Chiapas
Peru	2
Dominican Republic	3
3rd place
2010-09-25 Chiapas
Mexico	0
Argentina	3

Date		Score		Set 1	Set 2	Set 3	Set 4	Set 5	Total	Report
24 September	Dominican Republic	3–0	Argentina	25–23	25–12	25–19			75–54	Report
24 September	Peru	3–0	Mexico	25–13	25–10	25–15			75–38	Report

=== Bronze medal match ===
Date		Score		Set 1	Set 2	Set 3	Set 4	Set 5	Total	Report
25 September	Argentina	3–0	Mexico	25–10	25–15	25–11			75–36	Report

=== Final ===
Date		Score		Set 1	Set 2	Set 3	Set 4	Set 5	Total	Report
25 September	Dominican Republic	3–2	Peru	16–25	25–23	25–23	22–25	15–12	103-108	Report

2010 Final Four Women’s Volleyball Cup Winners

Dominican Republic
First title

== Final ranking ==
1. Dominican Republic
2. Peru
3. Argentina
4. Mexico

== Individual awards ==
- Most valuable player
  - (Dominican Republic) Dahiana Burgos
- Best scorer
  - (Dominican Republic) Dahiana Burgos
- Best spiker
  - (Peru) Jessenia Uceda
- Best blocker
  - (Peru) Leyla Chihuán
- Best server
  - (Peru) Elena Keldibekova
- Best digger
  - (Dominican Republic) Brenda Castillo
- Best setter
  - (Peru) Elena Keldibekova
- Best receiver
  - (Peru) Vanessa Palacios
- Best libero
  - (Dominican Republic) Brenda Castillo
