= 2009 Final Four Women's Volleyball Cup =

2009 Final Four Women’s Volleyball Cup

Tournament details
- Host country: Peru
- Dates: September 9–13, 2009
- Teams: 4
- Venue: Coliseo Eduardo Dibos (in Lima host cities)

Final positions
- Champions: Brazil (2nd title)

Tournament awards
- MVP: Joyce Silva (BRA)

The 2009 Final Four Women’s Volleyball Cup Chinalco Cup was the second edition of the annual women's volleyball tournament, played by four countries from September 9–13, 2009 in Lima, Peru. The teams qualified through the 2009 Pan-American Cup, held in Miami, Florida.

== Competing nations ==
Group A —

Brazil
Dominican Republic
Peru
United States

== Preliminary round ==
	Team	Points	G	W	L	PW	PL	Ratio	SW	SL	Ratio
1	Brazil	6	3	3	0	253	204	1.240	9	2	4.500
2	Dominican Republic	5	3	2	1	204	186	1.097	6	3	2.000
3	United States	4	3	1	2	254	246	1.033	5	7	0.714
4	Peru	3	3	0	3	171	246	0.695	1	9	0.111

- Wednesday September 9, 2009

United States	2-3	Brazil	12-25, 25–18, 22–25, 25–19, 13–15
Peru	0-3	Dominican Republic	14-25, 22–25, 13–25

- Thursday September 10, 2009

Dominican Republic	0-3	Brazil	18-25, 18–25, 18–25
Peru	1-3	United States	10-25, 25–20, 14–25, 20–25

- Friday September 11, 2009

United States	0-3	Dominican Republic	20-25, 19–25, 23–25
Brazil	3-0	Peru	25-18, 26–24, 25–11

== Final round ==
Semi-finals
2009-09-12 – Lima
Dominican Republic	1
United States	3
2009-09-12 – Lima
Peru	0
Brazil	3

Final
2009-09-13 – Lima
Brazil	3
United States	1
3rd place
2009-09-13 – Lima
Dominican Republic	3
Peru	0

=== Semifinals ===
- Saturday September 12, 2009

Dominican Republic	1-3	United States	20-25, 25–23, 23–25, 24–26
Peru	0-3	Brazil	21-25, 13–25, 15–25

=== Finals ===
- Sunday September 13, 2009

Dominican Republic	3-0	Peru	25-17, 25–21, 27–25
Brazil	3-1	United States	25-17, 25–16, 25–27, 25–19

== Final ranking ==
Place	Team
1.	Brazil
2.	United States
3.	Dominican Republic
4.	Peru

2009 Final Four Women’s Volleyball Cup Winners

Brazil
Second title

== Individual awards ==
- Most valuable player
  - Joyce Silva (BRA)
- Best scorer
  - Angela Pressey (USA)
- Best spiker
  - Regiane Bidias (BRA)
- Best blocker
  - Christa Harmotto (USA)
- Best server
  - Adenizia da Silva (BRA)
- Best digger
  - Brenda Castillo (DOM)
- Best setter
  - Ana Tiemi (BRA)
- Best receiver
  - Brenda Castillo (DOM)
- Best libero
  - Brenda Castillo (DOM)
