= 2009 Women's NORCECA Volleyball Championship =

2009 NORCECA Volleyball Championship
Tournament details
- Host country: Puerto Rico
- Dates: September 22–27, 2009
- Teams: 8
- Venue: Coliseo Rubén Rodríguez (in Bayamón host cities)

Final positions
- Champions: Dominican Republic (1st title)

Tournament awards
- MVP: Prisilla Rivera (DOM)

The 2009 Women's NORCECA Volleyball Championship was the 21st edition of the Women's Continental Volleyball Tournament, there eight countries competed from September 22 to September 27, 2009, in Bayamón, Puerto Rico. The top finisher qualified for the 2009 FIVB Women's World Grand Champions Cup in Japan.

== Competing nations ==
| Group A | Group B |
|---|---|
| Canada; Dominican Republic; Puerto Rico; Trinidad and Tobago | Cuba; Costa Rica; Mexico; United States |

== Preliminary round ==
=== Group A ===
| Pos | Team | Pld | W | L | Pts | SW | SL | SR | SPW | SPL | SPR | Qualification |
|---|---|---|---|---|---|---|---|---|---|---|---|---|
| 1 | Dominican Republic | 3 | 3 | 0 | 6 | 9 | 1 | 9.000 | 253 | 180 | 1.406 | Semifinals |
| 2 | Puerto Rico | 3 | 2 | 1 | 5 | 7 | 3 | 2.333 | 239 | 219 | 1.091 | Quarterfinals |
| 3 | Canada | 3 | 1 | 2 | 4 | 3 | 6 | 0.500 | 203 | 205 | 0.990 | Quarterfinals |
| 4 | Trinidad and Tobago | 3 | 0 | 3 | 3 | 0 | 9 | 0.000 | 134 | 225 | 0.596 | 5th-8th place |

- Tuesday September 22, 2009

| Canada | 0–3 | Dominican Republic | 20–25, 22–25, 20–25 |
| Puerto Rico | 3–0 | Trinidad and Tobago | 25–18, 25–15, 25–17 |

- Wednesday September 23, 2009

| Dominican Republic | 3–0 | Trinidad and Tobago | 25–12, 25–10, 25–7 |
| Canada | 0–3 | Puerto Rico | 22–25, 23–25, 21–25 |

- Thursday September 24, 2009

| Canada | 3–0 | Trinidad and Tobago | 25–20, 25–16, 25–19 |
| Puerto Rico | 1–3 | Dominican Republic | 21–25, 30–28, 16–25, 22–25 |

=== Group B ===
| Pos | Team | Pld | W | L | Pts | SW | SL | SR | SPW | SPL | SPR | Qualification |
|---|---|---|---|---|---|---|---|---|---|---|---|---|
| 1 | Cuba | 3 | 3 | 0 | 6 | 9 | 3 | 3.000 | 275 | 213 | 1.291 | Semifinals |
| 2 | United States | 3 | 2 | 1 | 5 | 8 | 3 | 2.667 | 252 | 173 | 1.457 | Quarterfinals |
| 3 | Mexico | 3 | 1 | 2 | 4 | 3 | 7 | 0.429 | 184 | 239 | 0.770 | Quarterfinals |
| 4 | Costa Rica | 3 | 0 | 3 | 3 | 2 | 9 | 0.222 | 187 | 273 | 0.685 | 5th-8th place |

- Tuesday September 22, 2009

| United States | 3–0 | Mexico | 25–18, 25–10, 25–13 |
| Cuba | 3–1 | Costa Rica | 25–14, 25–10, 22–25, 25–20 |

- Wednesday September 23, 2009

| Costa Rica | 1–3 | Mexico | 26–28, 25–23, 19–25, 19–25 |
| United States | 2–3 | Cuba | 25–19, 25–16, 16–25, 26–28, 10–15 |

- Thursday September 24, 2009

| Cuba | 3–0 | Mexico | 25–15, 25–13, 25–14 |
| United States | 3–0 | Costa Rica | 25–7, 25–10, 25–13 |

== Final round ==
=== Championship bracket ===
Semi-finals
2009-09-26 – Bayamón
Dominican Republic | 3
United States | 2
2009-09-26 – Bayamón
Cuba | 2
Puerto Rico | 3

Final
2009-09-27 – Bayamón
Dominican Republic | 3
Puerto Rico | 2
3rd place
2009-09-27 – Bayamón
United States | 2
Cuba | 3

=== 5th-8th bracket ===
5-8 Places
2009-09-26 – Bayamón
Trinidad and Tobago | 0
Mexico | 3
2009-09-26 – Bayamón
Costa Rica | 2
Canada | 3

5th Place
2009-09-27 – Bayamón
Mexico | 0
Canada | 3
7th place
2009-09-27 – Bayamón
Trinidad and Tobago | 0
Costa Rica | 3

=== Quarterfinals ===
- Friday September 25

| United States | 3 – 1 | Canada | 17–25, 25–10, 25–23, 25–21 |
| Puerto Rico | 3 – 0 | Mexico | 25–11, 25–15, 25–15 |

=== Semifinals ===
- Saturday September 26 — 5th/8th place

| Trinidad and Tobago | 0 – 3 | Mexico | 20–25, 16–25, 16–25 |
| Costa Rica | 0 – 3 | Canada | 17–25, 16–25, 22–25 |

- Saturday September 26 — 1st/4th place

| Dominican Republic | 3 – 2 | United States | 21–25, 26–24, 10–25, 25–20, 21–19 |
| Cuba | 2 – 3 | Puerto Rico | 25–21, 23–25, 17–25, 25–20, 19–21 |

=== Finals ===
- Sunday September 27 — Seventh Place Match

| Trinidad and Tobago | 0 – 3 | Costa Rica | 18–25, 22–25, 23–25 |

- Sunday September 27 — Fifth Place Match

| Mexico | 0 – 3 | Canada | 22–25, 21–25, 19–25 |

- Sunday September 27 — Bronze Medal Match

| United States | 2 – 3 | Cuba | 25–17, 25–16, 26–28, 16–25, 11–15 |

- Sunday September 27 — Gold Medal Match

| Dominican Republic | 3 – 2 | Puerto Rico | 19–25, 25–23, 16–25, 32–30, 15–8 |

== Final ranking ==
| Place | Team |
|---|---|
| 1. | Dominican Republic |
| 2. | Puerto Rico |
| 3. | Cuba |
| 4. | United States |
| 5. | Canada |
| 6. | Mexico |
| 7. | Costa Rica |
| 8. | Trinidad and Tobago |

2009 Women's NORCECA winners

Dominican Republic
1st title

  - Dominican Republic qualified for the 2009 FIVB World Grand Champions Cup

== Individual awards ==
Winners:

- Most valuable player
  - Prisilla Rivera (DOM)
- Best scorer
  - Áurea Cruz (PUR)
- Best spiker
  - Nancy Metcalf (USA)
- Best blocker
  - Nancy Carrillo (CUB)
- Best server
  - Yanelis Santos (CUB)
- Best digger
  - Brenda Castillo (DOM)
- Best setter
  - Vilmarie Mojica (PUR)
- Best receiver
  - Brenda Castillo (DOM)
- Best libero
  - Brenda Castillo (DOM)
- Rising Star
  - Wilma Salas (CUB)
