= 2008 Dominican Republic Volleyball League =

The 2008 Dominican Republic Volleyball League was the 2nd official season of the event. The SEDEFIR Cup was dedicated to Daniel Toribio. Distrito Nacional's team won their second title in both genders.

== Teams ==
=== Women's ===
- Distrito Nacional
- Santiago
- San Juan
- San Cristóbal
- La Romana
- Santo Domingo
- Espaillat
- San Pedro de Macorís

=== Men's ===
- Bahoruco
- Barahona
- Distrito Nacional
- Espaillat
- La Romana
- Monte Plata
- Sánchez Ramírez
- Santo Domingo

== Men's tournament ==
=== Preliminary round ===
==== Zone 1/ Group A ====
Pos	Team	Pld	W	L	Pts	SW	SL	SR	SPW	SPL	SPR
1	Distrito Nacional	12	8	4	20	25	17	1.471	994	916	1.085
2	Barahona	12	7	5	19	25	21	1.190	1002	1016	0.986
3	La Romana	12	5	7	17	22	26	0.846	1043	1090	0.957
4	Monte Plata	12	4	8	16	20	28	0.714	1072	1089	0.984

==== Zone 2/ Group B ====
Pos	Team	Pld	W	L	Pts	SW	SL	SR	SPW	SPL	SPR
1	Bahoruco	12	8	4	20	25	15	1.667	1049	1008	1.041
2	Sánchez Ramírez	12	8	4	20	29	17	1.706	1062	1029	1.032
3	Espaillat	12	7	5	19	26	21	1.238	1074	1018	1.055
4	Santo Domingo	12	2	10	14	8	34	0.235	849	1000	0.849

=== Final round ===
Semifinals
2008-12-20 – Santo Domingo
Distrito Nacional	3
Sánchez Ramírez	0
2008-12-20 – Santo Domingo
Bahoruco	3
Barahona	1

Final
2008-12-21 – Santo Domingo
Distrito Nacional	3
Bahoruco	1
3rd place
2008-12-20 – Santo Domingo
Sánchez Ramírez	3
Barahona	2

==== Semifinals ====
Date		Score		Set 1	Set 2	Set 3	Set 4	Set 5	Total
20 Dec	Distrito Nacional	3–0	Sánchez Ramírez	25–19	25–23	25–19			75–61
20 Dec	Bahoruco	3–1	Barahona	25–19	25–20	24–26	25–17		99–82

==== 3rd place match ====
Date		Score		Set 1	Set 2	Set 3	Set 4	Set 5	Total
20 Dec	Sánchez Ramírez	3–2	Barahona	25–23	21–25	15–25	25–23	19–17	105–113

==== Final ====
Date		Score		Set 1	Set 2	Set 3	Set 4	Set 5	Total
21 Dec	Distrito Nacional	3–1	Bahoruco	21–25	25–16	25–18	25–16		96–75

=== Final standing ===
Rank	Team
1	Distrito Nacional
2	Bahoruco
3	Sánchez Ramírez
4	Barahona
5	Espaillat
6	La Romana
7	Monte Plata
8	Santo Domingo

2008 Dominican Republic Volleyball League
Distrito Nacional
2nd title

=== Awards ===
- Most valuable player

Amaury Martínez (Distrito Nacional)

== Women's tournament ==
=== Preliminary round ===
==== Zone 3/ Group A ====
Pos	Team	Pld	W	L	Pts	SW	SL	SR	SPW	SPL	SPR
1	Distrito Nacional	12	12	0	24	34	0	MAX	921	542	1.699
2	San Cristóbal	12	7	5	19	20	15	1.333	831	857	0.970
3	Santo Domingo	12	4	8	16	15	27	0.556	843	943	0.894
4	San Pedro de Macorís	12	3	9	15	7	31	0.226	647	914	0.708

==== Zone 4/ Group B ====
Pos	Team	Pld	W	L	Pts	SW	SL	SR	SPW	SPL	SPR
1	Santiago	12	9	3	21	29	12	2.417	895	739	1.211
2	La Romana	12	8	4	20	24	17	1.412	932	768	1.214
3	Espaillat	12	6	6	18	24	19	1.263	1002	905	1.107
4	San Juan	12	1	11	13	3	24	0.125	645	931	0.693

=== Final round ===
Semifinals
2008-12-20 – Santo Domingo
San Cristóbal	3
Santiago	0
2008-12-20 – Santo Domingo
Distrito Nacional	3
La Romana	0

Final
2008-12-21 – Santo Domingo
San Cristóbal	0
Distrito Nacional	3
3rd place
2008-12-20 – Santo Domingo
Santiago	3
La Romana	0

==== Semifinals ====
Date		Score		Set 1	Set 2	Set 3	Set 4	Set 5	Total
20 Dec	San Cristóbal	3–0	Santiago	25–21	25–23	25–21			75–65
20 Dec	Distrito Nacional	3–0	La Romana	25–16	25–21	25–20			75–57

==== 3rd place match ====
Date		Score		Set 1	Set 2	Set 3	Set 4	Set 5	Total
20 Dec	Santiago	3–0	La Romana	25–21	25–18	25–18			75–57

==== Final ====
Date		Score		Set 1	Set 2	Set 3	Set 4	Set 5	Total
21 Dec	Distrito Nacional	3–0	San Cristóbal	25–23	25–12	25–18			75–53

=== Final standing ===
Rank	Team
1	Distrito Nacional
2	San Cristóbal
3	Santiago
4	La Romana
5	Espaillat
6	Santo Domingo
7	San Pedro de Macorís
8	San Juan

2008 Dominican Republic Volleyball League
Distrito Nacional
2nd title

=== Awards ===
- Most valuable player
  Jeoselyna Rodríguez (Distrito Nacional)
- Best scorer
  Lisvel Elisa Eve (Santiago)
- Best spiker
  Nuris Arias (Distrito Nacional)
- Best blocker
  Lisvel Elisa Eve (Santiago)
- Best server
  Cosiri Rodríguez (San Cristóbal)
- Best digger
  Brenda Castillo (San Cristóbal)
- Best setter
  Karla Echenique (Santiago)
- Best receiver
  Brenda Castillo San Cristóbal
- Best libero
  Carmen Rosa Caso Distrito Nacional
