= Milagros Cabral =

Dominican Republic volleyball player

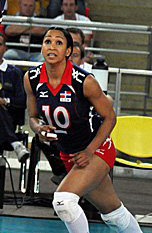
- Milagros Cabral in 2011

Personal information
- Full name: Milagros Cabral De La Cruz
- Nicknames: Mila, Milagritos
- Nationality: Dominican Republic
- Born: September 17, 1978 (age 48) Santo Domingo
- Home town: Santo Domingo
- Height: 1.82 m (6 ft 0 in)
- Weight: 63 kg (139 lb)
- Spike: 325 cm (128 in)
- Block: 320 cm (130 in)

Volleyball information
- Position: Wing Spiker

National team
- Years: Team
- 1998 -: Dominican Republic
Honours
Women's volleyball
Representing the Dominican Republic
World Grand Champions Cup
Bronze medal – third place	2009 Tokyo/Fukuoka	Team
Pan American Games
Gold medal – first place	2003 Santo Domingo	Team
Pan-American Cup
Gold medal – first place	2008 Mexicali/Tijuana	Team
Gold medal – first place	2010 Rosarito/Tijuana	Team
Silver medal – second place	2002 Tijuana	Team
Silver medal – second place	2003 Saltillo	Team
Silver medal – second place	2009 Miami	Team
Silver medal – second place	2011 Ciudad Juárez	Team
Bronze medal – third place	2006 San Juan	Team
Bronze medal – third place	2007 Colima	Team
NORCECA Championship
Gold medal – first place	2009 Bayamón	Team
Bronze medal – third place	2001 Santo Domingo	Team
Bronze medal – third place	2003 Santo Domingo	Team
Bronze medal – third place	2007 Winnipeg	Team
Central American and Caribbean Games
Gold medal – first place	2002 San Salvador	Team
Gold medal – first place	2006 Cartagena	Team
Gold medal – first place	2010 Mayagüez	Team
Silver medal – second place	1998 Maracaibo	Team
Final Four Cup
Silver medal – second place	2008 Fortaleza	Team
Bronze medal – third place	2009 Lima	Team
- Updated on June 2011

Milagros Cabral De La Cruz (born October 17, 1978, in Santo Domingo) is a retired female volleyball player from the Dominican Republic who won the 1998 silver and three consecutive gold medals in 2002, 2006 and 2010 at the Central American and Caribbean Games.

She competed for her native country at the 2004 Summer Olympics in Athens, Greece and at the 2012 Summer Olympics in London, Great Britain and played in four consecutives World Championships from 1998 to 2010.

As a professional player, she won the "Most Valuable Player" for the Spanish club Ícaro Alaró, when her club won the 2007 Liga Fev Championship. In addition, in 2008 with the Puerto Rican club Pinkin de Corozal, she was awarded Most Valuable Player and crowned with the championship.

== Early life ==
Milagros started playing volleyball with the team Los Cachorros in 1993, and internationally at Japan with the club Pioneer in 1997.

== Career ==
=== 1998 ===
Milagros started playing for the Senior National team at the 1998 Central American and Caribbean Games, where she won the silver medal.

Milagros also played at the 1998 FIVB World Championship, where the Dominican Republic finished in 11th place.

=== 1999 ===
She played in Italy for the Marsi Palermo, at a mostly Latin team, playing with fellow Dominican Nuris Arias, Argentines Marianna Ratti and Carolina Costagrande, and Cubans Marta Sánchez and Lilian Izquierdo.

=== 2000 ===
At the 2000 USA Volleyball Open Championships playing with the Dominican Dream Team, Cabral won the championship and she was selected among the All-Tournament Team.

=== 2002 ===
During The 2001–02 season Milagros played with fellow countrywoman Cosiri Rodríguez at the Spanish club Construcciones Damesa de Burgos. She won the 2002 Pan-American Cup silver medal.

At the 2002 FIVB World Championship, in her second participation at the top volleyball championship, she helped her country to finish in the 13th position.

For the 2002–03 season, Milagros played with Nuris Arias at the same club, this time sponsored by Universidad de Burgos. In both seasons with the club, she helped her team to reach the quarterfinals of the Indesit European Champions League, and the second place of the Spanish Queen's Cup.

Cabral won her first gold medal at the 2002 Central American and Caribbean Games held in San Salvador, El Salvador, also winning the "Most Valuable Player" award.

=== 2003 ===
Cabral's National Team won the silver medal at the 2003 Pan American Cup. The cup was won by the United States. Milagros finished the tournament with the Best Attacker and MVP awards.

Cabral was selected to swear the athletes' oath at the 2003 Pan American Games, held in Santo Domingo, Dominican Republic. In those games her national squad claimed the gold medal in this event for the first time, defeating for second time in the same year the powerful Cuban Team.

For the 2003–04 season she returned to the Italian League, this time as a middleblocker for Volley Modena.

=== 2004 ===
Returning home from Italy, where Cabral helped her team Modena to reach the semifinals, she played at the 2004 Distrito Nacional Superior Tournament, resulting in runner up playing with Los Cachorros, who lost to Mirador

The 2004 Summer Olympics saw the first Dominican Republic participation in women's volleyball, and Milagros had the chance to finish with an attack (scoring spike shot). It was the only Dominican Republic win against the US team in 5 sets. The Dominican Republic finished its participation in 11th place.

The Russian Super League received Cabral for the 2004–05 season with the Samorodok Khabarovsk team. There Milagros averaged 18 points.

=== 2005 ===
The Dominican Republic National Volleyball Federation chose Cabral and José Miguel Cáceres as 2004 Volleyball Players of the Year.

During her season with the Samorodok team, she was voted to be one of the favorites of the team fans and team leader.

At the end of the 2004–05 season, the Samorodok from Khabarovsk were able to play at the league quarterfinals. When at the 5th set against Balakovskaia AES Balakovo, Milagros suffered an injury in the achilles tendon of her right foot. Her team lost that game whose 5th set ended 19–17, and could not make it to the Final Four.

=== 2006 ===
She came back playing professionally at the Puerto Rican Liga de Voleibol Superior Femenino, playing with countrywoman Evelyn Carrera at Leonas de Ponce, after her Achilles tendon injury. She would later say that she was playing neither physically nor mentally in plenty form. Nonetheless, she was chosen among the league All-Stars, playing at the foreigners with countrywoman Annerys Vargas from Vaqueras de Bayamón.

At the IV Women's Villa de Benidorm International Volleyball Tournament, Cabral was selected Most Valuable Player by the players. Grupo 2002 Murcia won this club tournament, and the invitee Dominican Republic National Team was the first runner-up.

Milagros then came back to the national team at the 2006 Pan-American Cup, winning the bronze medal with her team.

During the quadrennial regional games celebrated in Cartagena, Colombia, the 2006 Central American and Caribbean Games, she won her second consecutive gold medal, when her national team defeated the powerful Cuban team in three sets. As gold medal recipient in those games, the Dominican Republic Ministry of Sports and Recreation Felipe Payano awarded Milagros and the rest of the Cartagena medalists with a Laptop to increase their professional development.

Under the guidance of the national coach Beato Miguel Cruz she went to her third world championship with her national team. There her team ended up in 17th place.

After the victory in Colombia, and her participation at the world championship, Cabral joined the Spanish club from Liga Fev, and Ícaro Alaró from Mallorca.

=== 2007 ===
The Ministry of Sports and Recreation Felipe Payano, mentioned Milagros among countrymates Juana Arrendel, Wanda Rijo, Cosiri Rodríguez and Yudelquis Contreras, as role models, when he was inaugurating the construction of sport courts and the remodeling of some other sports facilities.

Cabral contributed to the promotion of her club Ícaro Alaró to the highest level of Spanish volleyball, the Superliga. She was also crowned FEV Cup's Most Valuable Player.

Participating in Winnipeg, Canada, she won with her team the bronze medal at the 2007 NORCECA Championship.

After the Continental Championship, Cabral's National Team received a wild card to the 2007 FIVB World Cup, and her experience and the national team finished in 9th place.

=== 2008 ===
In October 2008 she signed on with the South Korean team Seongnam KEC Hi-pass, to play in that league for the first time. At the South Korean V-league, she ended the season as best player of Round 4, All-Star and season Best Scorer. During the season, when Milagros was leading all the scorers, her team used her to promote the team.

After the Korean League ending, Cabral joined the Puerto Rican team Pinkin de Corozal. She was selected among the foreign players for the All-Star game, and selected as Most Valuable Player at the end of the regular season . She was crowned with her team at the Championship, and was also selected as Most Valuable Player from the final series.

=== 2009 ===
After winning the gold medal with her team at the 2009 NORCECA Championship, Milagros qualified for the very first time for the 2009 World Grand Champions Cup, where her team won the bronze medal.

The Dominican Republic Newspaper Hoy awarded Milagros Cabral as Athlete of the Decade.

Milagros came back to the Seongnam KEC team from South Korea. The Korean coach took Milagros as an example for the younger players, because of her spiking technique.

At the end of the 2009−10 South Korean season, Cabral returned to play the end of the 2009 season at the Puerto Rican League, where she was praised for her exciting game. She helped Pinkin de Corozal to reach the finals, but could not win with her team, after she failed the last spike of the game.

=== 2010 ===
The Asics Rainbow Volleyball Club invited Cabral and the Dominican Republic Women's National Team, Marcos Kwiek, and Assistant Coach Warner Pacheco to give their U-17 and U-18 teams an international level training.

She won the gold medal with her national team at the 2010 Pan-American Cup held in Rosarito and Tijuana, Mexico.

After winning the 2010 Pan American Cup gold medal for the second time after the 2008 tournament, the President of the Dominican Republic Olympic Committee designed all the players from the National team as National Heroines.

Playing her 4th tournament at the Central American and Caribbean games, she won her 3rd consecutive gold medal, when her team defeated the Puerto Rican team at Mayagüez, Puerto Rico, in 5 sets. Later Milagros expressed that this triumph tasted like strawberry.

After the Central American and Caribbean games, the Dominican Republic government recognized the medalist athletes in those games and the 2010 Summer Youth Olympics with a total prize of RD$18.485 million Dominican pesos, which Cabral symbolically accepted in name of the whole group.

Finishing rumors of retirement, Milagros stated that she retired from the Central American and Caribbean games, but will be playing in the National team until the 2012 Summer Olympics

Milagros won the Unique Cup gold medal, defeated the Peruvian team in the final game played at Coliseo Eduardo Dibos in Lima, Peru.

The Osaka Municipal Central Gymnasium, in Osaka, Japan saw Cabral participate in her fourth World Championship in a row, but her team was not able to reach the second round, ranking 17th by defeating the Canadian team. Cabral felt disappointed at not qualifying to the second round in Tokyo.

In December 2010, Milagros played with the Dominican Republic club Mirador at the 2010 FIVB World Club Championship as team captain, finishing in 4th place with Mirador.

=== 2011 ===
For the third time, Cabral joined the Puerto Rican team Pinkin de Corozal

=== 2012 ===
After the last match she played in the defeat against the United States in the quarterfinals of the 2012 Summer Olympics, she announced that she was formally retired.

== Clubs ==
- (Dominican Republic) Los Cachorros (1995–1997)
- (Japan) Pioneer Red Wings (1997–1998)
- (Italy) Marsì Palermo (1998–1999)
- (Spain) Construcciones Damesa de Burgos (2001–2002)
- (Spain) Universidad de Burgos (2002–2003)
- (Dominican Republic) Los Cachorros (2001–2004)
- (Italy) Volley Modena (2003–2004)
- (Russia) Samorodok Khabarovsk (2004–2005)
- (Dominican Republic) Los Cachorros (2005)
- (Puerto Rico) Leonas de Ponce (2006)
- (Spain) Ícaro Alaró (2006–2007)
- (Puerto Rico) Pinkin de Corozal (2008)
- (South Korea) Seongnam KEC Hi-pass (2008–2009)
- (Puerto Rico) Pinkin de Corozal (2009)
- (South Korea) Seongnam KEC Hi-pass (2009–2010)
- (Dominican Republic) Mirador (2010)
- (Puerto Rico) Pinkin de Corozal (2011)

== Awards ==
=== Individuals ===
- 2000 USA Open Championships "All-Tournament Team"
- 2002 Central American and Caribbean Games "Most Valuable Player"
- 2003 Pan-American Cup "Most Valuable Player"
- 2003 Pan-American Cup "Best Attacker"
- 2004 Dominican Republic "Volleyball Player of the Year"
- 2006 Puerto Rican Liga de Voleibol Superior Femenino "All-Star"
- 2006–2007 Copa FEV "Most Valuable Player"
- 2008 Puerto Rican Liga de Voleibol Superior Femenino "Final Series Most Valuable Player"
- 2008 Puerto Rican Liga de Voleibol Superior Femenino "Most Valuable Player"
- 2008–2009 NH Bank Cup Korean V-League "All-Star"
- 2008–2009 NH Bank Cup Korean V-League "Best Player of 4th Round"
- 2008–2009 NH Bank Cup Korean V-League "Best Scorer"

=== Clubs ===
- 2002 Spanish Queen's Cup – Runner-Up, with Construcciones Damesa de Burgos
- 2003 Spanish Queen's Cup – Runner-Up, with Universidad de Burgos
- 2004 Dominican Republic Distrito Nacional Superior Tournament – Runner-Up, with Los Cachorros
- 2005 Dominican Republic Distrito Nacional Superior Tournament – Runner-Up, with Los Cachorros
- 2006–2007 Liga FEV – Champion, with Ícaro Alaró
- 2008 Liga de Voleibol Superior Femenino – Champion, with Pinkin de Corozal
- 2009 Liga de Voleibol Superior Femenino – Runner-Up, with Pinkin de Corozal
