= Yhonastan Fabian =

Personal information
- Born: March 18, 1984 (age 42) Monte Plata, Dominican Republic

Volleyball information

National team
- Years: Team
- 2006–2009: Dominican Republic

Yhonastan Fabian (born March 18, 1984, in Monte Plata), is a Dominican volleyball and beach volleyball coach as well as a former player who participated with La Romana in the 2013 FIVB Club World Championship as assistant coach.

== Career ==
He participated with his national team in the 2006 Central American and Caribbean Games, 2007 NORCECA Championship and the 2007 America's Cup. His team finished fourth, fifth and sixth, out of the medals. He played in the 2008 NORCECA Pre-Olympic Championship as a libero and wearing the #14 jersey. His team finished in the 6th place.

At the Dominican Republic Volleyball League, he was a runner-up with Bahoruco in the 2008 league championship, after played with Monte Plata in the preliminary round.

In Beach Volleyball, he participated in the NORCECA Beach Volleyball Circuit 2009 with William Sánchez, earning the 11th position.

Fabian served as assistant coach for his senior national team for the 2014 FIVB World Championship NORCECA qualification tournament#Pool C pool C in 2012 in Santo Domingo. He then coached for his U23 national team in the same position for the 2013 FIVB U23 World Championship and later for the Dominican professional club La Romana in the 2013 FIVB Club World Championship, when her team ended up in tied seventh place.

== Clubs ==
- (Dominican Republic) Bahoruco (2008)
- (Dominican Republic) Monte Plata (2008)
