= 2009 Men's Pan-American Volleyball Cup squads =

This article shows all participating team squads at the 2009 Men's Pan-American Volleyball Cup, held from June 15 to June 20, 2009 in Chiapas, Mexico.

== Canada ==
- Head Coach: Georges Laplante

#	Name	Date of birth	Height	Weight	Spike	Block
3	Steve Gotch
4	Davin St-Pierre
6	Olivier Faucher
8	Adam Simac
9	Dustin Schneider (c)
10	Toontje Van Lankvelt
11	Thomas Jarmoc
12	Gavin Schmitt
13	Joel Small
14	Justin Duff
15	Blair Bann
16	Joel Schmuland

== Dominican Republic ==
- Head Coach: Jacinto Campechano

#	Name	Date of birth	Height	Weight	Spike	Block
1	Elnis Palomino	2.07.1986	85	185	374	322
2	César Canario	10.10.1985	66	185	347	315
3	Elvis Contreras (c)	16.05.1984	75	185	345	320
4	Franklin González
5	William Sánchez
6	Pedro Luis García
7	Eduardo Concepción
11	José Miguel Cáceres	24.12.1981	96	210	361	340
12	José Castro	12.01.1981	82	188	336	326
15	Johan López Santos
16	Víctor Batista	02.10.1979	90	199	350	340
18	Juan Carlos Cabrera

== Guatemala ==
- Head Coach: Reidel Lucas

#	Name	Date of birth	Height	Weight	Spike	Block
1	Miguel Marroquín (c)
2	Luis García Betancourt
3	Julio Recinos Ocaña
7	José González Floris
8	Guillermo Castillo Figueroa
10	Erick Calvillo Salguero
11	Oscar García Galindo
12	Tirso Pineda López
13	Juan Méndez Molina
16	Jeyson Nery Flores
17	Aldo Barrios Cajas
18	Plubio Flores

== Mexico ==
- Head Coach: Jorge Azair

#	Name	Date of birth	Height	Weight	Spike	Block
1	Mario Becerra
2	Edgar Herrera
3	Francisco Enriquez
5	Pedro Rangel
7	Héctor Burgos
8	Ignacio Ramírez (c)
9	José Luis Alanis
14	Tomás Aguilera
15	Leonardo Manzo
16	Jorge Barajas
17	Jorge Nava
18	David Alva

== Panama ==
- Head Coach: Sergio Ballesta

#	Name	Date of birth	Height	Weight	Spike	Block
7	Jorge Patiño
8	Richard Araba
10	Rubén Cuero
11	Eduardo Guerra (c)
12	José Ríos
13	Víctor Herazo
14	Jonathan Denham
15	Otto Penso
16	Rubén Beltrán
17	Francisco De Toma
18	Roberto Muñoz
19	Luis Maclao

== Puerto Rico ==
- Head Coach: Ramón Hernández

#	Name	Date of birth	Weight	Height	Spike	Block
4	Victor Rivera
5	Víctor Bird	16.03.1982	90	195	335	328
6	Dennis Del Valle
7	Sequiel Sánchez
8	Iván Pérez
9	Oscar Rivera
12	Dimar López
14	Fernando Morales (c)	04.02.1982	68	186	299	292
15	Juan Figueroa
16	Johnatan King
18	Edgardo Goas
19	Edwin Aquino

== United States ==
- Head Coach: Richard Mclaughlin

#	Name	Date of birth	Height	Weight	Spike	Block
1	Erick Vance
3	Dean Bittner II
4	Matthew Mckinney
5	Isaac Kneubuhl
6	Tyler Hildebrand (c)
7	Robert Tarr
8	Nathan Meerstein	13.11.1982
9	Nils Nielsen
10	Brian Thornton
11	Maxwell Holt
14	Austin Zahn
19	Dustin Watten
