= Elnis Palomino =

Volleyball player from the Dominican Republic

Elnis Palomino Castillo

Personal information
- Nationality: Dominican
- Born: 2 July 1986 (age 40); San Pedro de Macorís, Dominican Republic
- Height: 194 cm (6 ft 4 in)
- Weight: 94 kg (207 lb)
- Spike: 342 cm (135 in)
- Block: 332 cm (131 in)

National team
2007–2014	Dominican Republic
Honours
Men's volleyball
Representing the Dominican Republic
Pan American Cup
Bronze medal – third place	2009 Chiapas	Team
Bronze medal – third place	2012 Santo Domingo	Team
Central American and Caribbean Games
Gold medal – first place	2014 Veracruz	Team

Elnis Palomino Castillo (born 2 July 1986 in San Pedro de Macorís) is a Dominican Republic male volleyball player who competed with the Dominican club La Romana in the 2013 FIVB Club World Championship.

== Career ==
Palomino was chosen Rookie of the Year in the 2006 Dominican Republic league, while playing with the club José Martí. With the Dominican club Sánchez Ramírez Palomino played the 2008 Dominican Republic League season, winning the bronze medal.

Palomino played with Distrito Nacional contributing to win the 2010 season Dominican Republic Volleyball League championship. He then played with the professional club from the Argentinian League Instituto Dr. Carlos Pellegrini for the 2010–2011 season. With his national team, he won the bronze medal in the 2009 Pan-American Cup and he played the 2010 edition and won the bronze again in the 2012 cup.

With the Dominican Republic national team he lost the chance to play the 2014 World Championship, after winning the gold medal and best server in the first round, but his team lost to Puerto Rico the final qualifier round.

Palomino lost the bronze medal in the 2010 Central American and Caribbean Games 2-3 from Mexico but he won the 2014 regional games gold medal, the country's first ever gold.

Palomino played in the 2013 FIVB Club World Championship with the Dominican club La Romana finishing in tied seventh place. With his national team, Palomino won the 2013 NORCECA Final Four Cup silver medal and the Best Server individual award. In 2014, Palomino played with the Dominican local team Los Alcarrizos from the Santo Domingo provincial tournament.

For the 2014–2015 season he signed with the Lebanese club Riseleh Sarafand. For this contract he was expelled from the national team because his Lebanese club was blamed of not paying the international transfer fee and for playing without permission. He was later reinstated but refused to come back to the national team citing mistreatment and the difference of training conditions of the male and female national team. Palomino played with Team IE from the American Professional Volleyball League in the 2016 season, ranking seventh with his team.

== Clubs ==
- (Dominican Republic) José Martí (2006)
- (Dominican Republic) Sánchez Ramírez (2008)
- (Dominican Republic) Distrito Nacional (2010)
- (Argentina) Instituto Dr. Carlos Pellegrini (2010–2011)
- (Israel) Maccabi Hod Hasharon (2011–2012)
- (Dominican Republic) La Romana (2013)
- (Dominican Republic) Los Alcarrizos (2014)
- (Lebanon) Riseleh Sarafand (2014–2015)
- (United States) Team IE (2016)

== Awards ==
=== Individuals ===
- 2013 NORCECA Final Four "Best Server"

=== Clubs ===
- 2008 Dominican Republic Volleyball League – Bronze medal, with Sánchez Ramírez
- 2010 Dominican Republic Volleyball League - Champion, with Distrito Nacional
