= Ana Binet =

Dominican Republic volleyball player

Ana Yorkira Binet

Personal information
- Full name: Ana Yorkira Binet Stephens
- Nationality: Dominican Republic
- Born: February 9, 1992 (age 34); Sánchez, Samaná
- Hometown: Santo Domingo
- Height: 1.74 m (5 ft 8 1/2 in)
- Weight: 62 kg (137 lb)
- Spike: 267 cm (105 in)
- Block: 288 cm (113 in)

Volleyball information
- Position: Libero/Wing Spiker
- Current club: (Dominican Republic) Mirador
- Number: 6

National team
| 2008 - | Dominican Republic |
Honours
Women's volleyball
Representing the Dominican Republic
U20 World Championship
| Silver medal – second place | 2009 Mexicali/Tijuana | Team |
FIVB U23 World Championship
| Silver medal – second place | 2013 Tijuana | Team |
Pan American Games
| Bronze medal – third place | 2015 Toronto | Team |
NORCECA Championship
| Gold medal – first place | 2009 Bayamón | Team |
| Silver medal – second place | 2011 Caguas | Team |
| Silver medal – second place | 2013 Omaha | Team |
Pan American Cup
| Gold medal – first place | 2010 Rosarito/Tijuana | Team |
| Gold medal – first place | 2014 Mexico City | Team |
| Gold medal – first place | 2016 Santo Domingo | Team |
| Silver medal – second place | 2013 Lima | Team |
| Silver medal – second place | 2015 Lima/Callao | Team |
| Silver medal – second place | 2017 Cañete/Lima | Team |
Final Four Cup
| Gold medal – first place | 2010 Chiapas | Team |
| Bronze medal – third place | 2009 Lima | Team |
Central American and Caribbean Games
| Gold medal – first place | 2010 Mayagüez | Team |
| Gold medal – first place | 2014 Veracruz | Team |
- Last updated: April 2011

Ana Yorkira Binet Stephens (born February 9, 1992) is a volleyball player from the Dominican Republic. She was born in Sánchez, Samaná.

== Career ==
=== 2008 ===
She participated as the libero for her Girls U-18 National Team at the 2008 NORCECA Girls Youth Continental Championship U-18 held in Guaynabo, Puerto Rico. There, her team won the bronze medal and she won the Best Receiver and Best Defense awards.

=== 2009 ===
With her National Junior Team to win the Silver Medal playing as wing spiker, at the 2009 U20 World Championship, at Mexicali, Mexico. She competed for her native country at the 2009 FIVB Girls' U18 Volleyball World Championship in Nakhon Ratchasima, Thailand, wearing the number #6 jersey and playing as wing spiker. There she ended up in 11th place.

=== 2010 ===
At the 2010 Hato Mayor Beach Volleyball Tournament beach volleyball (three) with Niverka Marte and Marianne Fersola, they won the gold medal.

After winning the gold medal at the 2010 Pan-American Cup with the senior team, she won the silver medal at the 2010 NORCECA Junior Continental Championship U-20.

In late September, she participated with her Senior Nacional Team who won the gold medal at the 2010 Final Four Cup.

=== 2011 ===
Binet played at Hato Mayor, winning the gold medal in the annual Sport Festival in Beach Volleyball (three), playing with Altagracia Mambrú and Niverka Marte.

== Clubs ==
- (Dominican Republic) Samaná (2006)
- (Dominican Republic) Distrito Nacional (2007–2008)
- (Dominican Republic) Santo Domingo (2008)
- (Dominican Republic) Espaillat (2010)
- (Dominican Republic) Puñal (2010)
- (Dominican Republic) Mirador (2010)
- (Dominican Republic) Malanga Manoguayabo (2011)
- (Dominican Republic) Mirador (2015)

== Awards ==
=== Individuals ===
- 2007 Dominican Volleyball League "Best Libero"
- 2007 Dominican Volleyball League "Best Defense"
- 2007 Dominican Volleyball League "Best Receiver"
- 2008 NORCECA Girls Youth Continental Championship U-18 "Best Defense"
- 2008 NORCECA Girls Youth Continental Championship U-18 "Best Receiver"
- 2010 NORCECA Junior Continental Championship U-20 "Best Scorer"

=== National team ===
==== Senior team ====
- 2010 Final Four Cup - Gold Medal
- 2010 Central American and Caribbean Games - Gold Medal
- 2010 Pan-American Cup - Gold Medal
- 2009 NORCECA Championship, Gold Medal
- 2009 Final Four Cup - Bronze Medal

==== Junior team ====
- 2010 NORCECA Women´s Junior Continental Championship U-20 Silver Medal
- 2009 FIVB U20 Volleyball World Championship Silver Medal
- 2008 NORCECA Women´s Junior Continental Championship U-20 Silver Medal
- 2006 NORCECA Girls Youth Continental Championship U-18 Silver Medal

=== Clubs ===
- 2007 & 2008 Dominican Republic Volleyball League - Champion, with Distrito Nacional

=== Beach volleyball ===
- 2010 Hato Mayor Beach Volleyball Tournament Gold Medal
- 2011 Hato Mayor Beach Volleyball Tournament Gold Medal
