= Lisvel Elisa Eve =

Dominican volleyball player

Lisvel Eve

Personal information
- Full name: Lisvel Elisa Eve Castillo
- Nickname: China
- Nationality: Dominican
- Born: September 10, 1991 (age 35); Puerto Plata, Dominican Republic
- Hometown: Santo Domingo
- Height: 1.93 m (6 ft 4 in)
- Weight: 87 kg (192 lb)
- Spike: 325 cm (128 in)
- Block: 315 cm (124 in)

Volleyball information
- Position: Middle Blocker/Wing Spiker/Opposite Spiker
- Current club: PTT
- Number: 3

National team
2007 -	Dominican Republic
Honours
Women's volleyball
Representing the Dominican Republic
Pan American Games
Gold medal – first place	2019 Lima	Team
Gold medal – first place	2023 Santiago	Team
World Grand Champions Cup
Bronze medal – third place	2009 Tokyo/Fukuoka	Team
U20 World Championship
Silver medal – second place	2009 Mexicali/Tijuana	Team
Pan-American Cup
Gold medal – first place	2016 Santo Domingo	Team
Gold medal – first place	2010 Rosarito/Tijuana	Team
Gold medal – first place	2008 Mexicali/Tijuana	Team
Silver medal – second place	2019 Trujillo and Chiclayo	Team
Silver medal – second place	2011 Ciudad Juárez	Team
Silver medal – second place	2009 Miami	Team
NORCECA Championship
Gold medal – first place	2009 Bayamón	Team
Bronze medal – third place	2007 Winnipeg	Team
Final Four Cup
Gold medal – first place	2010 Chiapas	Team
Silver medal – second place	2008 Fortaleza	Team
Bronze medal – third place	2009 Lima	Team
Central American and Caribbean Games
Gold medal – first place	2010 Mayagüez	Team
U23 Pan-American Cup
Gold medal – first place	2012 Callao	Team
- Last updated: February 2013

Lisvel Elisa Eve-Castillo (née:Eve Mejía, born September 10, 1991) is a female volleyball player from the Dominican Republic, who played for the Women's National Team at the 2012 Summer Olympics.

Eve also played the 2008 Olympic Qualification Tournament in Japan. There the team ended up in fourth place, and did not qualify for the 2008 Summer Olympics. Shortly afterwards Eve claimed the gold medal at the 2008 Women's Pan-American Volleyball Cup in Mexico as a sixteen-year-old.

== Personal life ==
Eve was born on September 10, 1991 in Puerto Plata. She was recruited by the former National Team member Miriam García.

== Career ==
Eve was the youngest athlete during the 2007 FIVB Women's World Cup, there she ranked 9th with her national team. She was chosen 2008 Athlete of the Year of her native province of Puerto Plata by the Guild of Sport Writers.

Playing in Puerto Rico at the Liga de Voleibol Superior Femenino with Criollas de Caguas for the 2009 season, Eve was chosen among the "All-Star" Team, and also at the "Offensive Team".

Playing in Chiapas, Mexico, with her National Senior Team, Eve won the 2010 Final Four Cup gold medal. She signed for the Japanese professional club Denso Airybees for the 2010–2011 season.

At the 2011 Pan-American Cup, Eve was awarded with the Best Server award, also winning the silver medal with her national team. For the 2012 Season of the Puerto Rican League, Eve signed for the team Criollas de Caguas.

At the 2012 Olympic Games held in London, Eve played with her National Team ranking in the 5th place after losing the quarter final game to the United States.

Eve signed for the Brazilian professional club Banana Boat/Praia Clube for the 2012–13 season. Even when she was announced, her Brazilian team presented the American Danielle Scott and instead of playing in Brazil, she was signed by the Peruvian professional club Deportivo Géminis for a three months contract.

In September 2012, Eve won the gold medal at the first 2012 U23 Pan-American Cup, played in Callao, Peru.

=== 2013 Injury ===
During the 2012/2013 Peruvian League, Eve suffered an exposed tibia and fibula fracture in her left leg on February 16, 2013. She went under surgery for surgical cleaning.

=== 2024 Doping Controversy ===
Lisvel Eve was removed from the Dominican national team that will compete in the 2024 Olympic Games for testing positive for doping for use of furosemide, a substance banned by the World Anti-Doping Agency (WADA).

== Clubs ==
- (Dominican Republic) Deportivo Nacional (2004–2005)
- (Dominican Republic) Mirador (2006–2007)
- (Dominican Republic) Santiago (2008)
- (Puerto Rico) Criollas de Caguas (2009)
- (South Korea) GS Caltex (2009–2010)
- (Puerto Rico) Indias de Mayagüez (2010)
- (Japan) Denso Airybees (2010–2011)
- (Puerto Rico) Criollas de Caguas (2012)
- (Peru) Deportivo Géminis (2012–2013)
- (Peru) Deportivo Géminis (2015–2019)
- (Peru) Universidad de San Martín de Porres (2019–2020)

== Awards ==
=== Individuals ===
- 2008 NORCECA Junior Continental Championship U-20 "Best Attacker"
- 2008 Dominican Volleyball League "Best Blocker"
- 2008 Dominican Volleyball League "Best Scorer"
- 2009 Liga de Voleibol Superior Femenino "All-Star"
- 2009 Liga de Voleibol Superior Femenino "Offensive Team"
- 2010 Pan-American Cup "Best Blocker"
- 2011 Pan-American Cup "Best Server"
- 2015 NORCECA Champions Cup "Most Valuable Player"
- 2019 Pan American Games "Best Middle Blockers"

==== Junior team ====
- 2006 NORCECA Girls Youth Continental Championship U-18 Silver Medal
- 2008 NORCECA Women´s Junior Continental Championship U-20 Silver Medal
- 2009 FIVB U20 Volleyball World Championship Silver Medal
- 2012 U23 Pan-American Cup - Gold Medal

=== Clubs ===
- 2008 Dominican Republic Volleyball League - 3rd Place, with Santiago
- 2010 Empress's Cup - Champion, with Denso Airybees
