= Francisco Abreu López =

Dominican volleyballer

Personal information
- Full name: Francisco Alberto Abreu López
- Born: April 26, 1983 (age 43); Santo Domingo, Dominican Republic
- Height: 1.87 m (6 ft 1 1/2 in)

Volleyball information
- Position: Setter
- Current club: VBC Waremme
- Number: 10

National team
2006–present	Dominican Republic
Honours
Men's volleyball
Representing the Dominican Republic
Central American and Caribbean Games
Gold medal – first place	2014 Veracruz	Team

Francisco Alberto Abreu López (born April 26, 1982) is a male volleyball and beach volleyball player from Dominican Republic, who won the gold medal with his national team at the 2014 Central American and Caribbean Games.

== Career ==
He played professionally at home with the club Jose Marti from the National District volleyball tournament.

Abreu played at the 2007 America's Cup wearing the #10 jersey. His team finished in the 6th place.

He also participated in the 2007 Pan-American Cup. His team finished 5th.

At the Dominican Republic Volleyball League he won the championship with Distrito Nacional at the 2008 league championship.

In Beach Volleyball, he represented his country in the 2006 NORCECA Beach Volleyball Continental Championship partnering Juan Antonio Pozo, losing the bronze medal match to Costa Ricans Gilberto and Alexánder Villegas 19–21, 21–14, 17–15, and finishing in 4th place. Later that year, he participated at the beach volleyball tournament at the 2006 Central American and Caribbean Games in Cartagena, Colombia, partnering Yewddys Pérez and finishing in the 8th place.

In the NORCECA Beach Volleyball Circuit 2008 he played with Yewddys Pérez, earning the 8th position.

He played for Distrito Nacional for the 2008 season, winning the league championship.

Abreu won with his national team the gold medal at the 2014 Central American and Caribbean Games held in Veracruz, Mexico.

== Clubs ==
- (Dominican Republic) Jose Martí (2006)
- (Dominican Republic) Distrito Nacional (2008)
- (Belgium) Beivoc Humbeek (2008–2010)
- (Belgium) VC Global Wineries Kapellen (2010–2011)
- (Belgium) Beivoc Humbeek Belgian (2008–2010)
- (Belgium) Kapellen Belgian (2010–2011)
- (France) Dunkerque Grand Littoral Volley-Ball (2011–2012)
- (Belgium) Axis Shanks Guibertin (2014–2015)
- (Belgium) VBC Waremme (2015- )

== Awards ==
=== Clubs ===
- 2008 Dominican Republic Championship – Champion, with Distrito Nacional
