= William Sánchez (volleyball) =

Personal information
- Full name: William Sánchez Tejeda
- Born: February 19, 1986 (age 40)
- Height: 1.95 m (6 ft 5 in)
- Weight: 86 kg (190 lb)
- Spike: 348 cm (137 in)
- Block: 337 cm (133 in)

Volleyball information
- Current club: (Dominican Republic) Maria trinidad sanchez
- Number: 5

Career
- Years: Team
- 2008: (Dominican Republic) Sánchez Ramírez

National team
- Years: Team
- 2007 -: Dominican Republic
Honours
Men's volleyball
Representing the Dominican Republic
Pan-American Volleyball Cup
Bronze medal – third place	2009 Chiapas	Team
- Updated on November 2009

William Sánchez Tejeda (born February 19, 1986) is a male volleyball and beach volleyball player from the Dominican Republic. He participated in the NORCECA Beach Volleyball Circuit 2009 with Yhonastan Fabian, earning the 11th position.

In the Dominican Republic Volleyball League, he won the 3rd place with Sánchez Ramírez at the 2008 league championship.

== Clubs ==
- (Dominican Republic) Sánchez Ramírez (2008)
- (Dominican Republic) Espaillat (2008)
