= Karla Echenique =

Dominican Republic volleyball player

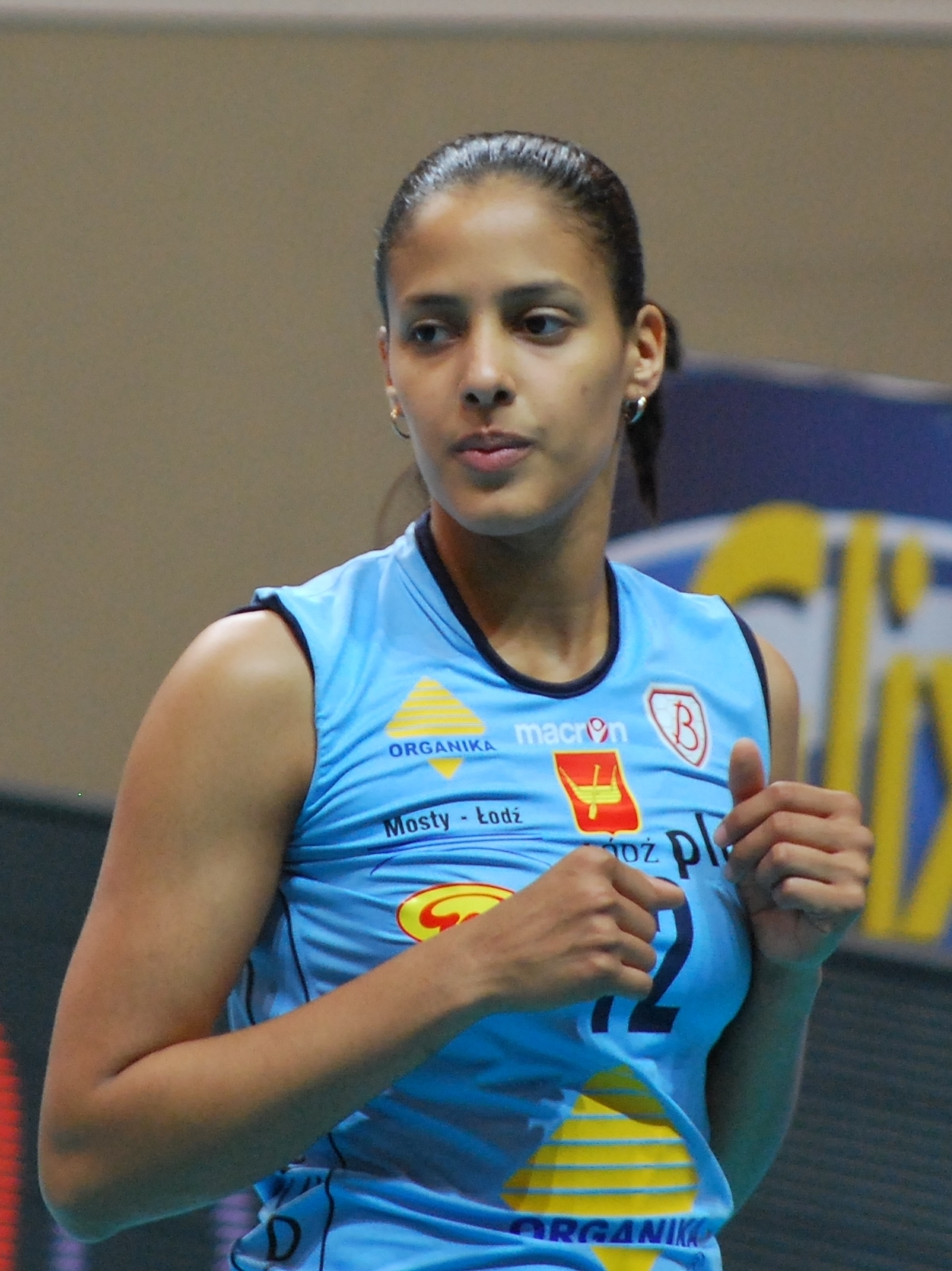

Personal information
- Full name: Karla Miguelina Echenique Medina
- Nationality: Dominican Republic
- Born: 16 May 1986 (age 40); Santo Domingo
- Hometown: Santo Domingo
- Height: 1.80 m (5 ft 11 in)
- Weight: 62 kg (137 lb)
- Spike: 300 cm (120 in)
- Block: 290 cm (110 in)

Volleyball information
- Position: Setter
- Current club: (Poland) Organika Budowlani Łódź
- Number: 12

National team
| 2002 - | Dominican Republic |
Honours
Women's volleyball
Representing the Dominican Republic
World Grand Champions Cup
| Bronze medal – third place | 2009 Tokyo/Fukuoka | Team |
Pan-American Cup
| Gold medal – first place | 2010 Rosarito/Tijuana | Team |
| Gold medal – first place | 2008 Mexicali/Tijuana | Team |
| Silver medal – second place | 2011 Ciudad Juárez | Team |
| Silver medal – second place | 2009 Miami | Team |
| Silver medal – second place | 2005 Santo Domingo | Team |
| Bronze medal – third place | 2006 San Juan | Team |
NORCECA Championship
| Gold medal – first place | 2009 Bayamón | Team |
Central American and Caribbean Games
| Gold medal – first place | 2002 San Salvador | Team |
| Gold medal – first place | 2006 Cartagena | Team |
| Gold medal – first place | 2010 Mayagüez | Team |
Final Four Cup
| Gold medal – first place | 2010 Chiapas | Team |
| Silver medal – second place | 2008 Fortaleza | Team |
| Bronze medal – third place | 2009 Lima | Team |
- Last updated: March 2011

Karla Miguelina Echenique Medina (Note: In this Spanish name, the first or paternal surname is Echenique and the second or maternal family name is Medina.) (born 16 May 1986 in Santo Domingo) is a volleyball player from the Dominican Republic, who played as a setter for the Women's National Team at the 2008 Olympic Qualification Tournament in Japan, but did not qualify for the 2008 Summer Olympics. She, and the Dominican Republic team did, however, qualify for the 2012 Summer Olympics, where they finished 5th.

Personal Life: Karla has a brother and more than one sister. One of her sisters is Michelle Echenique who is a current student at The University of Florida.

== Career ==
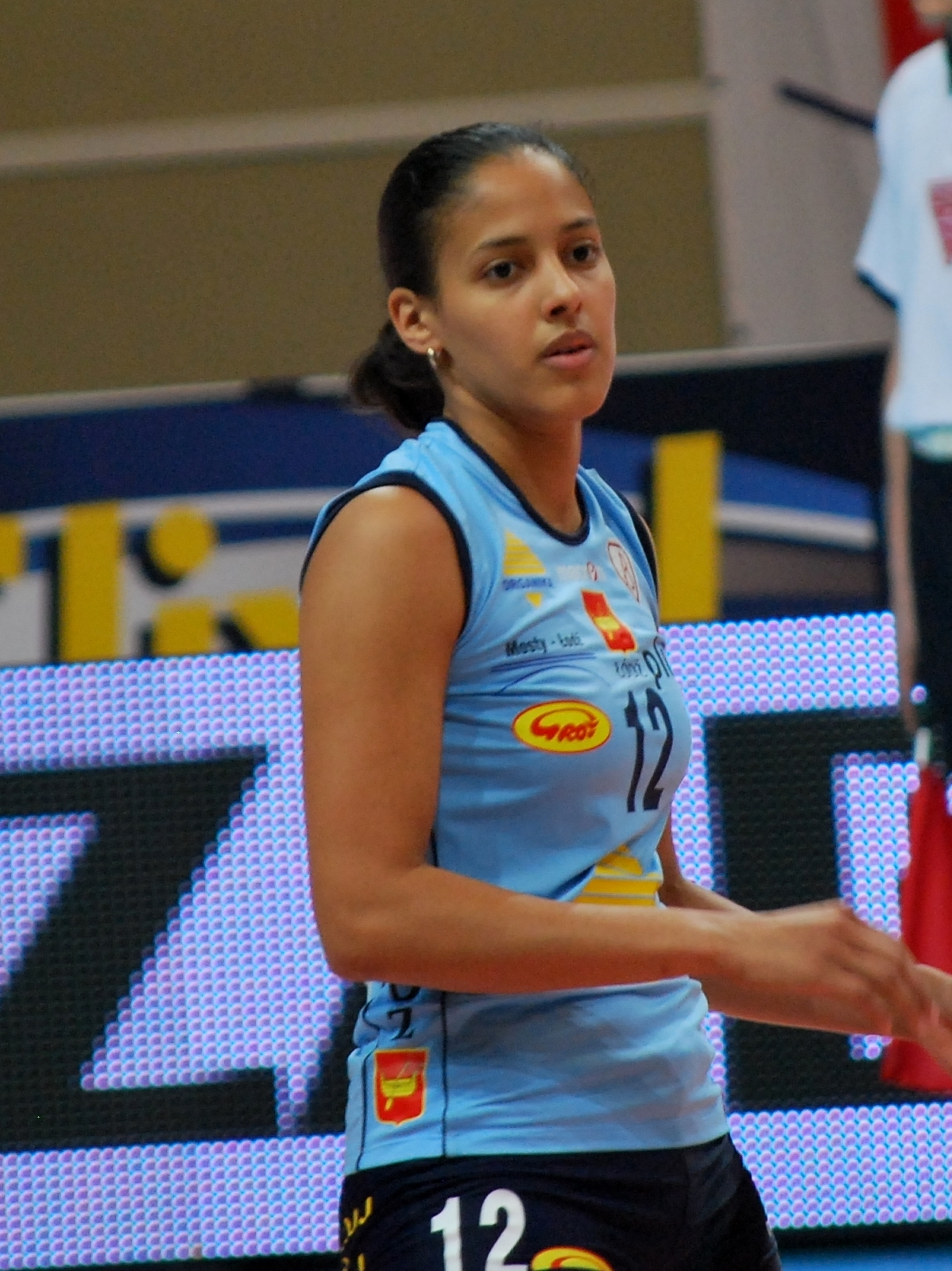
Karla Echenique while playing with Organika Budowlani Łódź.

She won the silver medal with the National Junior Team at 2002 NORCECA Youth Girls' Volleyball Championship and was selected tournament "Best Setter". Same year she participated at the 2002 World Championships with the National Senior Team at the age of 15, making her the youngest player at the competition. She helped her team to reach the 13th place.

In beach volleyball she won the bronze medal at the 2006 National Championship, playing with Bethania de la Cruz.

She finished in fourth place, playing in Japan at the 2008 Olympic Qualification Tournament, and did not qualify for the 2008 Summer Olympics. Shortly afterwards she claimed the gold medal at the 2008 Women's Pan-American Volleyball Cup in Mexico.

During the Holy Week Sport Festival held in Hato Mayor, Echenique played Beach Volleyball (three) with Bethania Almanzar and Dahiana Burgos, winning the silver medal of the event.

=== 2010 ===
Karla played for Gigantes de Carolina for the Puerto Rican LVSF in the 2010 season, being awarded by Statistics as "Best Setter", and was also selected to the All-Star game. She helped her team to reach the quarterfinals.

Playing in Chiapas, Mexico with her National Senior Team, she won the 2010 Final Four Cup gold medal.

Karla returned to the Dominican club Mirador, to play at the 2010 FIVB Women's Club World Championship, ranking in 4th place.

=== 2011 ===
At the middle of the 2010/2011 season, Echenique joined the Polish team Organika Budowlani Łódź, to play at the Polish Women's-Volleyball League.

== Clubs ==
- (Dominican Republic) Deportivo Nacional (2000–2004)
- (Dominican Republic) Bameso (2004–2005)
- (Dominican Republic) Modeca (2005–2006)
- (Dominican Republic) Mirador (2006)
- (Spain) Voley Sanse Mepaban (2006–2007)
- (Dominican Republic) Santiago (2008)
- (Puerto Rico) Gigantes de Carolina (2010)
- (Dominican Republic) Mirador (2010)
- (Poland) Organika Budowlani Łódź (2010–2011)
- (Puerto Rico) Lancheras de Cataño (2012–2013)
- (Puerto Rico) Valencianas de Juncos (2013–2014)

== Awards ==
=== Individuals ===
- 2010 Liga de Voleibol Superior Femenino "All-Star"
- 2010 World Championship NORCECA Qualification Pool H "Best Setter"
- 2008 Dominican Volleyball League "Best Setter"
- 2002 NORCECA Girls Youth Continental Championship U-18 "Best Server"

=== Beach volleyball ===
- 2006 National Championship - Bronze Medal
- 2009 Hato Mayor Beach Volleyball Tournament Silver Medal

=== National team ===
==== Junior team ====
- 2002 NORCECA Girls Youth Continental Championship U-18 Silver Medal

=== Clubs ===
- 2006 Dominican Republic Distrito Nacional Superior Tournament - Champion, with Mirador
- 2008 Dominican Republic Volleyball League - 3rd Place, with Santiago
