= Jeoselyna Rodríguez =

Dominican Republic volleyball player

Personal information
- Full name: Jeoselyna Rodríguez Santos
- Nickname: Yosy
- Nationality: Dominican
- Born: December 9, 1991 (age 34); Santo Domingo, Dominican Republic
- Hometown: Santo Domingo, Dominican Republic
- Height: 1.87 m (6 ft 2 in)
- Weight: 63 kg (139 lb)
- Spike: 325 cm (128 in)
- Block: 315 cm (124 in)

Volleyball information
- Position: Opposite / Outside Hitter

National team
2007 -	Dominican Republic
Honours
Women's volleyball
Representing the Dominican Republic
World Grand Champions Cup
Bronze medal – third place	2009 Tokyo/Fukuoka	Team
FIVB U23 World Championship
Silver medal – second place	2013 Tijuana	Team
U20 World Championship
Silver medal – second place	2009 Mexicali/Tijuana	Team
Pan-American Cup
Gold medal – first place	2010 Rosarito/Tijuana	Team
Silver medal – second place	2009 Miami	Team
Silver medal – second place	2013 Peru	Team
NORCECA Championship
Gold medal – first place	2009 Bayamón	Team
Bronze medal – third place	2007 Winnipeg	Team
Final Four Cup
Gold medal – first place	2010 Chiapas	Team
Bronze medal – third place	2009 Lima	Team
Central American and Caribbean Games
Gold medal – first place	2010 Mayagüez	Team
U23 Pan-American Cup
Gold medal – first place	2012 Callao	Team
- Last updated: January 2014

Jeoselyna Rodríguez Santos (born December 9, 1991, in Santo Domingo) is a female volleyball player from the Dominican Republic, who won the bronze medal at the 2009 World Grand Champions Cup. She won the 2009 NORCECA Championship gold medal, bronze in the 2007 edition and the gold medal at the 2010 Central American and Caribbean Games playing with the Dominican Republic national team. She also won the gold medal at the 2010 Pan-American Cup and the silver at the 2009 and 2013 editions.

With her Junior National team, Rodríguez won the best server award at the 2007 FIVB Girls' U18 World Championship while her team finished 8th. She won the silver medal at the 2009 U20 World Championship and the 2013 U23 World Championship.

== Career ==
=== 2007 ===
She competed for her native country at the 2007 FIVB Girls' U18 World Championship in Baja California, Mexico, wearing the number #10 jersey. There she won the Best server award and her team ended up in 8th place.

With the Dominican Republic women's national team. Rodriguez played as an opposite hitter. She claimed the bronze medal with the national squad at the 2007 NORCECA Championship.

=== 2008 ===
Jeoselyna played in the Salonpas Cup international tournament held in São Paulo, Brazil with CDN Mirador. Her team finished in the 5th place.

She started playing professionally overseas with the team West Side Stars, from Trinidad & Tobago. She helped her team to finish in 3rd place. Later that year, in Dominican Republic she became MVP in the 2008 Dominican Republic Volleyball League season.

=== 2009 ===
Early 2009, she signed with Indias de Mayagüez for the 2009 season of Puerto Rican league, Liga de Voleibol Superior Femenino.

After winning the silver medal with the Senior team in the 2009 Pan-American Cup, she also won the silver medal with the National Junior Team at the 2009 Women's U20 Volleyball World Championship, there she finished the second Best scorer.

=== 2010 ===
Playing in Chiapas, Mexico, with her National Senior Team she won the 2010 Final Four Cup gold medal.

For the 2010/2011 season, she joined CAV Murcia 2005 from the Spaniard Superliga, where she played with her fellow countrymates Prisilla Rivera and Marianne Fersola.

Jeoselyna became "Ideal Seven" from the 2010/2011 Superliga 7th journey.

=== 2011 ===
In the Spanish Queen's Cup, Jeoselyna's team, Murcia 2005 won Valeriano Alles Menorca in 5 sets; she contributed with 9 points to win the club's tournament.

Rodríguez joined Mirador to play at the 2011 FIVB Women's Club World Championship. Her team finished in 4th place after losing the Bronze Medal match to the Brazilian team Sollys/Nestle. She were also one of the Top Performers of the tournament with 25 points against Kenya Prisons.

=== 2012 ===
In September 2012, Rodríguez won the gold medal at the first 2012 U23 Pan-American Cup, played in Callao, Peru.

She signed with the Romanian professional club 2004 Tomis Constanța to play the 2012/2013 season in the Romanian league and the European Champions League. Rodríguez carried out her team, being the most offensive player. She led her team to a second place in the Romanian league and a ticked to the Challenge round of the CEV Cup, before leaving the team in the late December winter break along with Meagan Ganzer and Génesis Machado.

=== 2013 ===
In June, Rodríguez played at the Pan-American Cup winning the silver medal with her national team. She helped her national team to win the silver medal at the U23 World Championship, contributing to win its pool with a 4–1 record including a 7 aces match that topped all servers. They later had a 3–0 win over the USA team in the semifinals before falling 0–3 to China in the final match. She dominated the best server statistics while performing among the top scorers being awarded tournament's Best Opposite.

Rodríguez took part in the second Dominican participation at the World Grand Champions Cup, this time via wild card, taking with her national team the sixth place after their only victory to Thailand.

=== 2014 ===
In early 2014, Rodríguez joined the Peruvian league defending champion Universidad César Vallejo.

== Clubs ==
- (Dominican Republic) Mirador (2002–2004)
- (Dominican Republic) Modeca (2005)
- (Dominican Republic) Mirador (2006)
- (Dominican Republic) Deportivo Nacional (2007–2008)
- (Dominican Republic) Distrito Nacional (2007–2008)
- (Trinidad and Tobago) West Side Stars (2008)
- (Dominican Republic) Centro (2009)
- (Puerto Rico) Indias de Mayagüez (2009)
- (Brazil) Vôlei Futuro (2009–2010)
- (Dominican Republic) Distrito Nacional (2010)
- (Spain) CAV Murcia 2005 (2010–2011)
- (Dominican Republic) Mirador (2011–2012)
- (Romania) 2004 Tomis Constanța (2012–2013)
- (Peru) Universidad César Vallejo (2014)

== Awards ==
=== Individuals ===
- 2007 FIVB Girls' U18 Volleyball World Championship "Best server"
- 2008 Dominican Volleyball League "Most valuable player"
- 2012 Copa Latina "Best scorer"
- 2013 U23 World Championship "Best opposite"

=== National team ===
==== Senior team ====
- 2007 NORCECA Championship – Bronze Medal
- 2009 FIVB World Grand Champions Cup – Bronze Medal
- 2009 NORCECA Championship – Gold Medal
- 2009 Pan-American Cup – Silver Medal
- 2009 Final Four Women's Cup – Bronze Medal
- 2010 Final Four Women's Cup – Gold Medal
- 2010 Central American and Caribbean Games – Gold Medal
- 2010 Pan-American Cup – Gold Medal
- 2013 Pan-American Cup – Silver Medal

==== Junior team ====
- 2006 NORCECA Girls Youth Continental Championship U-18 – Silver Medal
- 2008 NORCECA Women´s Junior Continental Championship U-20 – Silver Medal
- 2009 FIVB U20 Volleyball World Championship – Silver Medal
- 2012 U23 Pan-American Cup – Gold Medal
- 2013 U23 World Championship – Silver Medal

=== Clubs ===
- 2006 Dominican Republic Distrito Nacional Superior Tournament – Champion, with Mirador
- 2007, 2008 Dominican Republic Volleyball League – Champion, with Distrito Nacional
- 2010 Spanish Supercup – Champion, with Murcia 2005
- 2011 Spanish Queen's Cup – Champion, with Murcia 2005
- 2010–11 Spanish Superleague – Runner-Up, with Murcia 2005
