= Juana Saviñón =

Dominican Republic volleyball player (born 1980)

Personal information
- Full name: Juana Saviñón Pérez
- Nickname: Danny
- Born: September 13, 1980 (age 46); San Cristóbal, Dominican Republic
- Height: 1.81 m (5 ft 11 in)
- Weight: 75 kg (165 lb)
- Spike: 303 cm (119 in)
- Block: 300 cm (118 in)

Volleyball information
- Position: Wing Spiker

National team
1998-2005	Dominican Republic
Honours
Women's volleyball
Representing the Dominican Republic
NORCECA Championship
Bronze medal – third place	2003 Santo Domingo	Team
Central American and Caribbean Games
Gold medal – first place	2002 San Salvador	Team
Silver medal – second place	1998 Maracaibo	Team

Juana Saviñón Pérez (born September 13, 1980) is a volleyball player from the Dominican Republic, who competed for her native country at the 2004 Summer Olympics in Athens, Greece, wearing the number #8 jersey.

There she ended up in eleventh place with the Dominican Republic women's national team. Saviñón played as a wing-spiker.

== Clubs ==
- (Dominican Republic) Evosancris (-1998)
- (Dominican Republic) Mirador (1999–2003)
- (Dominican Republic) Los Cachorros (2004)
- (Dominican Republic) Mirador (2005)
- (Dominican Republic) San Cristóbal (2007–2008)
- (Dominican Republic) Centro (2009)
- (Dominican Republic) La Romana (2010)
- (Dominican Republic) Navarrete (2010)
- (Dominican Republic) Los Mina (2011)
