= Cosiri Rodríguez =

Female volleyball player from the Dominican Republic

Personal information
- Full name: Cosiri Rodríguez Andino de Dionicio
- Nickname: Cosiris
- Nationality: Dominican Republic
- Born: August 30, 1977 (age 49); San Cristóbal
- Hometown: San Cristóbal
- Height: 1.91 m (6 ft 3 in)
- Weight: 72 kg (159 lb)
- Spike: 313 cm (123 in)
- Block: 305 cm (120 in)

Volleyball information
- Position: Opposite spiker / Universal
- Number: 10

National team
| 1998 - | Dominican Republic |
Honours
Women's volleyball
Representing the Dominican Republic
Pan American Games
| Gold medal – first place | 2003 Santo Domingo | Team |
Pan-American Cup
| Gold medal – first place | 2008 Mexicali/Tijuana | Team |
| Silver medal – second place | 2005 Santo Domingo | Team |
| Bronze medal – third place | 2006 San Juan | Team |
| Bronze medal – third place | 2007 Colima | Team |
NORCECA Championship
| Bronze medal – third place | 2001 Santo Domingo | Team |
| Bronze medal – third place | 2003 Santo Domingo | Team |
| Bronze medal – third place | 2005 Port of Spain | Team |
| Bronze medal – third place | 2007 Winnipeg | Team |
Central American and Caribbean Games
| Gold medal – first place | 2006 Cartagena | Team |
| Silver medal – second place | 1998 Maracaibo | Team |
Final Four Cup
| Silver medal – second place | 2008 Fortaleza | Team |
- Last updated: April 2010

Cosiri Rodríguez Andino de Dionicio (born August 30, 1977, in San Cristóbal) is a retired volleyball player from the Dominican Republic, who competed for her native country at the 2004 Summer Olympics in Athens, Greece, wearing the number #15 jersey. There, she ended up in eleventh place with the Dominican Republic women's national team.

== Career ==
She started representing her home country in the 1993 Central American and Caribbean Games in Ponce, Puerto Rico.

At the 2000 USA Open Championships her team won the championship and she was selected All-Tournament "MVP".

Playing with the Spanish club Hotel Cantur Costa Mogán, Rodriguez won the 2003 Spanish Superleague Championship and the second place at the 2003 CEV Cup.

Rodríguez claimed the gold medal with the national squad at the 2003 Pan American Games. She also was elected Best Digger and Best Receiver. Later that year, she claimed with her team the bronze medal and the Best Receiver award at the 2003 NORCECA Championship.

Cosiri won the "Most Valuable Player" award at the 2004 Distrito Nacional Superior Tournament in Dominican Republic. She helped Mirador to win the 9th consecutive and 23rd Championship, defeating Los Cachorros in the 7th game of the final series.

Late 2004, Rodríguez joined the Spanish club Tenerife Marichal, winning with this team the Spanish Superliga championship and the Queens cup.

Rodríguez played more than 300 matches for her National Team.

For the 2010–2011 season of the Spanish Superliga, Rodríguez signed with Cantabria Infinita, after some of their players decided not to return after the holiday season.

== Clubs ==
- (Dominican Republic) San Cristóbal (1992)
- (Dominican Republic) Mirador (1993–1999)
- (Puerto Rico) Conquistadoras de Guaynabo (1997)
- (Dominican Republic) Los Prados (1999–2002)
- (Spain) CD Universidad de Granada (2000–2001)
- (Spain) Construcciones Damesa de Burgos (2001–2002)
- (Spain) Hotel Cantur Costa Mogán (2002–2003)
- (Dominican Republic) Mirador (2002–2004)
- (Italy) Kab Holding Sassuolo (2003–2004)
- (Spain) Tenerife Marichal (2004–2005)
- (Dominican Republic) Los Cachorros (2005)
- (Spain) Hotel Cantur Las Palmas (2005–2006)
- (Spain) Voley Sanse Mepaban (2006–2007)
- (Puerto Rico) Mets de Guaynabo (2008)
- (Dominican Republic) San Cristóbal (2008)
- (Puerto Rico) Criollas de Caguas (2009)
- (Spain) Cantabria Infinita (2010–2011)
- (Spain) Voley Playa Madrid (2011–2012)

== Awards ==
=== Individuals ===
- 1997 Puerto Rican League "Best Scorer"
- 2000 USA Open Championships "MVP"
- 2003 Pan-American Games "Best Receiver"
- 2003 Pan-American Games "Best Defender"
- 2003 NORCECA Championship "Best Receiver"
- 2004 Pan-American Cup "Best Receiver"
- 2008 Dominican Volleyball League "Best Server"

=== Clubs ===
- 2001 Spanish Superliga – Runner-Up, with CD Universidad de Granada
- 2002 Spanish Queen Cup – Runner-Up, with Construcciones Damesa de Burgos
- 2003 CEV Cup – Runner-Up, with Hotel Cantur Costa Mogán
- 2003 Spanish Superliga – Champion, Hotel Cantur Costa Mogán
- 2004 Dominican Republic Distrito Nacional Superior Tournament – Champion, with Mirador
- 2004 Spanish Super Cup – Champion, with Tenerife Marichal
- 2005 Spanish Superliga – Champion, with Tenerife Marichal
- 2005 Spanish Super Cup – Runner-Up, with Hotel Cantur
- 2005 Spanish Queen Cup – Champion, with Tenerife Marichal
- 2005 Dominican Republic Distrito Nacional Superior Tournament – Runner-Up, with Los Cachorros
- 2006 Spanish Superliga – Runner-Up, with Hotel Cantur
- 2006 Spanish Queen Cup – Runner-Up, with Hotel Cantur
- 2008 Dominican Republic Volleyball League – Runner-Up, with San Cristóbal
