= Amaury Martínez =

Dominican volleyball player

Personal information
- Full name: Amaury Eduardo Martínez Aguilera
- Nationality: Dominican Republic
- Born: February 13, 1973 (age 53); Santo Domingo, Dominican Republic
- Hometown: Santo Domingo, Dominican Republic
- Height: 1.92 m (6 ft 3 1/2 in)
- Weight: 90 kg (200 lb)
- Spike: 325 cm (128 in)
- Block: 320 cm (130 in)

Volleyball information
- Position: Wing Spiker
- Current club: (Dominican Republic) Distrito Nacional
- Number: 9

National team
1998 -	Dominican Republic
- Last updated: June 2010

Amaury Eduardo Martínez Aguilera (born February 13, 1973) is a male volleyball player from the Dominican Republic. He participated with the men's national team in the 2007 NORCECA Championship in Anaheim, United States. His team finished in 5th place and he was awarded the "Best Libero" award.

== Career ==
Martínez played with Bameso at the 2004 USA Open Championship. There, his team finished with a 9–0 mark to win the Championship.

At the 2005 NORCECA Championship he was selected "Best Libero" and "Best Receiver".

In beach volleyball, he won the silver medal playing with Cristian Cabral at the 2006 Voliarena Cup, held in Santo Domingo.

Playing with the professional Dominican team Distrito Nacional, Martínez won with his club the 2007 season championship, and he was awarded "Most Valuable Player". This year he was awarded 2007 Volleyball Player of the Year.

For the 2008 season of the Dominican Republic League, he repeated with his team the Championship and the "MVP" award.

== Clubs ==
- (Dominican Republic) Bameso (1997–2006)
- (Dominican Republic) Distrito Nacional (2007–2008)

== Awards ==
=== Individuals ===
- 2008 Dominican Volleyball League "Most Valuable Player"
- 2007 Dominican Volleyball League "Most Valuable Player"
- 2007 Dominican Republic "Volleyball Player of the Year"
- 2007 NORCECA Championship "Best Libero"
- 2007 Pan-American Cup "Best Libero"
- 2005 NORCECA Championship "Best Libero"
- 2005 NORCECA Championship "Best Defender"

=== Clubs ===
- 2004, 2005 & 2006 Dominican Republic Distrito Nacional Superior Tournament – Champion, with Bameso
- 2004 USA Open Championship – Champion, with Bameso
- 2007, 2008 & 2010 Dominican Republic Volleyball League – Champion, with Distrito Nacional

=== Beach Volleyball ===
- 2006 Voliarena Cup – Silver Medal
