= Ana Ligia Fabian =

Dominican Republic volleyball player (born 1988)

Personal information
- Full name: Ana Ligia Fabian Hernández
- Nickname: Anali
- Born: November 7, 1988 (age 37); Santo Domingo, Dominican Republic
- Hometown: Santo Domingo
- Height: 1.79 m (5 ft 10 1/2 in)
- Weight: 51 kg (112 lb)
- Spike: 310 cm (122 in)
- Block: 305 cm (120 in)

Volleyball information
- Position: Wing Spiker
- Number: 8

National team
Dominican Republic

Ana Ligia Fabian Hernández (born November 7, 1988) is a volleyball player from the Dominican Republic, who participated in the 2007 Junior World Championship in Thailand. She competed as wing spiker, wearing the #4 jersey. At the 2006 U-20 NORCECA Women´s Junior Continental Championship, she took with her team the silver medal.

She participated with Ingrid Carmona at the NORCECA Beach Volleyball Circuit in 2007 and 2009 with Ysaires Restituyo, finishing in 11th and 9th position.

== Clubs ==
- (Dominican Republic) Mirador (2003)
- (Dominican Republic) Los Prados (2004–2005)
- (Dominican Republic) Mirador (2006)
- (Dominican Republic) Aviación (2006)
- (Dominican Republic) Distrito Nacional (2007)
- (Dominican Republic) San Juan (2008)
