= Johan López =

Dominican volleyball player (born 1989)

Johan Lopez

Personal information
- Full name: Johan Lopez Santos
- Nickname: Kuquin
- Nationality: Dominican Republic
- Born: 16 April 1989 (age 37); Rio San Juan
- Hometown: Ottawa
- Height: 2.01 m (6 ft 7 in)
- Weight: 100 kg (220 lb)
- Spike: 354 cm (139 in)
- Block: 333 cm (131 in)

Volleyball information
- Position: Middle-Blocker, Opposite
- Current club: (Canada) So Ninja

National team
2006 -	Dominican Republic
Honours
Men's volleyball
Representing the Dominican Republic
Pan American Cup
Bronze medal – third place	2008 Winnipeg	Team
Bronze medal – third place	2009 Chiapas	Team
- Last updated: September 2012

Johan Lopez Santos (born 16 April 1989, in Rio San Juan) is a male volleyball player from the Dominican Republic, who won the bronze medal with the men's national team at the 2008 Men's Pan-American Volleyball Cup in Winnipeg, Canada. He plays as a Middle-Blocker and Opposite.

== Clubs ==
- (Dominican Republic) Bameso (2006)
- (Dominican Republic) Avanzada Juvenil (2006)
- (Dominican Republic) 29 de Junio (2007)
- (Dominican Republic) Santo Domingo (2007–2008)
- (Dominican Republic) Distrito Nacional (2007–2008)
- (Dominican Republic) Sanchez Ramirez (2010)
- (Dominican Republic) La Romana (2010)
- (Dominican Republic) San Antonio Los Alcarrizos (2011)
- (Canada) Junk (2011–2012)
- (Canada) So Ninja (2012–2013)

== Awards ==
- Bameso (2006) Champion
- Distrito Nacional Men Volleyball Club(2007–2008)Champion
- San Antonio Los Alcarrizos (2011) Second
- Dominican National Championship(2010)San Francisco de Macoris Champion
