= Beach volleyball at the 2011 Pan American Games – Men's tournament =

Beach volleyball – Men's tournament at the 2011 Pan American Games
- Venue: Pan American Beach Volleyball Stadium
- Dates: October 17–22
- Competitors: 32 from 16 nations

Medalists
Gold medal	Alison Cerutti; Emanuel Rego	Brazil
Silver medal	Igor Hernández; Farid Mussa	Venezuela
Bronze medal	Santiago Etchgaray; Pablo Suarez	Argentina

The men's tournament competition of the beach volleyball events at the 2011 Pan American Games will take place between 17 and 22 of October at the Pan American Beach Volleyball Stadium. The defending Pan American Games champion is Emanuel Rego & Ricardo Santos of Brazil.

Each of the 16 pairs in the tournament was placed in one of four groups of four teams apiece, and played a round-robin within that pool. The top two teams in each pool advanced to the Quarterfinals. The third along with the fourth-placed teams in each group, were eliminated.

The 8 teams that advanced to the elimination rounds played a single-elimination tournament with a bronze medal match between the semifinal losers.

== Schedule ==
Date	Start	Finish	Phase
Monday October 17, 2011	9:00	18:00	Preliminaries
Tuesday October 18, 2011	9:00	18:00	Preliminaries
Wednesday October 19, 2011	9:00	18:00	Preliminaries
Thursday October 20, 2011	9:00	15:00	Quarterfinals
Friday October 21, 2011	10:00	16:00	Semifinals
Sa October 22, 2011	10:00	16:00	Gold/Bronze medal matches

== Preliminary round ==
All times are Central Standard Time (UTC−06:00)

=== Group A ===
Pos	Team	Pld	W	L	Pts	SW	SL	SR	SPW	SPL	SPR	Qualification
1	Williman – Zanotta (URU)	3	2	1	5	4	2	2.000	120	103	1.165	Quarterfinals
2	Miramontes – Virgen (MEX)	3	2	1	5	4	2	2.000	132	118	1.119	Quarterfinals
3	Saxton – Redmann (CAN)	3	2	1	5	4	2	2.000	136	127	1.071	
4	Lopez – Umaña (NCA)	3	0	3	3	0	6	0.000	89	129	0.690	

Date		Score		Set 1	Set 2	Set 3	Report
Oct 17	Miramontes – Virgen (MEX)	2–0	Lopez – Umaña (NCA)	21–12	21–15		
Oct 17	Williman – Zanotta (URU)	0–2	Saxton – Redmann (CAN)	17–21	19–21		
Oct 18	Miramontes – Virgen (MEX)	0–2	Williman – Zanotta (URU)	18–21	19–21		
Oct 18	Saxton – Redmann (CAN)	2–0	Lopez – Umaña (NCA)	24–22	21–16		
Oct 19	Williman – Zanotta (URU)	2–0	Lopez – Umaña (NCA)	21–11	21–13		
Oct 19	Miramontes – Virgen (MEX)	2–0	Saxton – Redmann (CAN)	28–26	25–23		

=== Group B ===
Pos	Team	Pld	W	L	Pts	SW	SL	SR	SPW	SPL	SPR	Qualification
1	Hernández – Mussa (VEN)	3	3	0	6	6	2	3.000	154	136	1.132	Quarterfinals
2	Fuller – Van Zwieten (USA)	3	2	1	5	5	2	2.500	138	117	1.179	Quarterfinals
3	Grimalt – Grimalt (CHI)	3	1	2	4	3	4	0.750	131	121	1.083	
4	Medrano – Vargas (ESA)	3	0	3	3	0	6	0.000	77	125	0.616	

Date		Score		Set 1	Set 2	Set 3	Report
Oct 17	Grimalt – Grimalt (CHI)	2–0	Medrano – Vargas (ESA)	21–12	21–10		
Oct 17	Fuller – Van Zwieten (USA)	1–2	Hernández – Mussa (VEN)	19–21	21–18	14–16	
Oct 18	Grimalt – Grimalt (CHI)	1–2	Hernández – Mussa (VEN)	18–21	21–18	16–18	
Oct 18	Fuller – Van Zwieten (USA)	2–0	Medrano – Vargas (ESA)	21–16	21–12		
Oct 19	Grimalt – Grimalt (CHI)	0–2	Fuller – Van Zwieten (USA)	15–21	19–21		
Oct 19	Hernández – Mussa (VEN)	2–0	Medrano – Vargas (ESA)	21–10	21–17		

=== Group C ===
Pos	Team	Pld	W	L	Pts	SW	SL	SR	SPW	SPL	SPR	Qualification
1	Etchgaray – Suarez (ARG)	3	2	1	5	4	2	2.000	121	94	1.287	Quarterfinals
2	Garrido – Leornado (GUA)	3	2	1	5	4	2	2.000	116	100	1.160	Quarterfinals
3	Rodríguez – Underwood (PUR)	3	2	1	5	4	2	2.000	118	105	1.124	
4	Brown – Gordon (JAM)	3	0	3	3	0	6	0.000	70	126	0.556	

Date		Score		Set 1	Set 2	Set 3	Report
Oct 17	Rodríguez – Underwood (PUR)	2–0	Brown – Gordon (JAM)	21–11	21–13		
Oct 17	Etchgaray – Suarez (ARG)	2–0	Garrido – Leornado (GUA)	21–19	21–11		
Oct 18	Rodríguez – Underwood (PUR)	0–2	Garrido – Leornado (GUA)	13–21	21–23		
Oct 18	Etchgaray – Suarez (ARG)	2–0	Brown – Gordon (JAM)	21–13	21–9		
Oct 19	Rodríguez – Underwood (PUR)	2–0	Etchgaray – Suarez (ARG)	21–18	21–19		
Oct 19	Garrido – Leornado (GUA)	2–0	Brown – Gordon (JAM)	21–9	21–15		

=== Group D ===
Pos	Team	Pld	W	L	Pts	SW	SL	SR	SPW	SPL	SPR	Qualification
1	Gonzalez – Piña (CUB)	3	3	0	6	6	0	MAX	131	107	1.224	Quarterfinals
2	Cerutti – Rego (BRA)	3	2	1	5	4	2	2.000	114	85	1.341	Quarterfinals
3	Pérez – Recio (DOM)	3	1	2	4	2	4	0.500	110	128	0.859	
4	Escobar – Monge (CRC)	3	0	3	3	0	6	0.000	95	131	0.725	

Date		Score		Set 1	Set 2	Set 3	Report
Oct 17	Cerutti – Rego (BRA)	2–0	Escobar – Monge (CRC)	21–11	21–7		
Oct 17	Gonzalez – Piña (CUB)	2–0	Pérez – Recio (DOM)	25–23	21–17		
Oct 18	Pérez – Recio (DOM)	2–0	Escobar – Monge (CRC)	24–22	21–18		
Oct 18	Cerutti – Rego (BRA)	0–2	Gonzalez – Piña (CUB)	19–21	11–21		
Oct 19	Cerutti – Rego (BRA)	2–0	Pérez – Recio (DOM)	21–13	21–12		
Oct 19	Gonzalez – Piña (CUB)	2–0	Escobar – Monge (CRC)	21–16	23–21		

== Elimination stage ==
Quarterfinals
D2	Cerutti – Rego (BRA)	21	21
A1	Williman – Zanotta (URU)	16	13
D1	Gonzalez – Piña (CUB)	21	16	12
A2	Miramontes – Virgen (MEX)	19	21	15
B2	Fuller – Van Zwieten (USA)	20	18
C1	Etchgaray – Suarez (ARG)	22	21
B1	Hernández – Mussa (VEN)	21	21
C2	Garrido – Leornado (GUA)	15	15

Semifinals
D2	Cerutti – Rego (BRA)	21	20	15
A2	Miramontes – Virgen (MEX)	19	22	6
C1	Etchgaray – Suarez (ARG)	21	16	12
B1	Hernández – Mussa (VEN)	19	21	15

Gold medal match
D2	Cerutti – Rego (BRA)	21	21
B1	Hernández – Mussa (VEN)	17	12
Bronze medal match
A2	Miramontes – Virgen (MEX)	21	19	11
C1	Etchgaray – Suarez (ARG)	14	21	15

=== Quarterfinals ===
Date		Score		Set 1	Set 2	Set 3	Report
Oct 20	Cerutti – Rego (BRA)	2–0	Williman – Zanotta (URU)	21–16	21–13		
Oct 20	Gonzalez – Piña (CUB)	1–2	Miramontes – Virgen (MEX)	21–19	16–21	12–15	
Oct 20	Fuller – Van Zwieten (USA)	0–2	Etchgaray – Suarez (ARG)	20–22	18–21		
Oct 20	Hernández – Mussa (VEN)	2–0	Garrido – Leornado (GUA)	21–15	21–15		

=== Semifinals ===
Date		Score		Set 1	Set 2	Set 3	Report
Oct 21	Cerutti – Rego (BRA)	2–1	Miramontes – Virgen (MEX)	21–19	20–22	15–6	
Oct 21	Etchgaray – Suarez (ARG)	1–2	Hernández – Mussa (VEN)	21–19	16–21	12–15	

=== Bronze medal match ===
Date		Score		Set 1	Set 2	Set 3	Report
Oct 22	Miramontes – Virgen (MEX)	1–2	Etchgaray – Suarez (ARG)	21–14	19–21	11–15	

=== Gold medal match ===
Date		Score		Set 1	Set 2	Set 3	Report
Oct 22	Cerutti – Rego (BRA)	2–0	Hernández – Mussa (VEN)	21–17	21–12		
