= Nuris Arias =

Dominican Republic volleyball player

Personal information
- Full name: Nuris Arias Doñé
- Nationality: Dominican Republic
- Born: May 20, 1973 (age 53); San Cristobal
- Hometown: Santo Domingo
- Height: 1.91 m (6 ft 3 in)
- Weight: 69 kg (152 lb)
- Spike: 315 cm (124 in)
- Block: 306 cm (120 in)

Volleyball information
- Position: Wing Spiker

National team
1998–2009	Dominican Republic
Honours
Women's volleyball
Representing the Dominican Republic
Pan American Games
Gold medal – first place	2003 Santo Domingo	Team
Pan-American Cup
Silver medal – second place	2009 Miami	Team
Bronze medal – third place	2006 San Juan	Team
Bronze medal – third place	2007 Colima	Team
Central American and Caribbean Games
Gold medal – first place	2002 San Salvador	Team
Gold medal – first place	2006 Cartagena	Team
Silver medal – second place	1998 Maracaibo	Team
- Last updated: July 2010

Nuris Arias Doñé (born May 20, 1973, in San Cristobal) is a retired volleyball player from the Dominican Republic, who won the gold medal with the women's national team at the 2003 Pan American Games in her home town of Santo Domingo, Dominican Republic. She was inducted into the Dominican Republic Hall of Fame in 2022.

== Career ==
At the 2000 USA Volleyball Open Championships won by her team, Arias was selected among the All-Tournament team.

Playing as a wing-spiker she also competed at the 2006 FIVB Women's World Championship for her native country, wearing the #9 jersey.

Arias was the first volleyball player who tested positive when she failed a control test with the anabolic steroid Metandienone during the 2003 FIVB World Cup first round and was given a two-year suspension.

She was inducted into the Dominican Republic Hall of Fame in 2022.

== Clubs ==
- (Dominican Republic) San Cristóbal (1991–1997)
- (Japan) Tohoku Pioneer (1997–1998)
- (Italy) Marsì Palermo (1998–1999)
- (Italy) Olimpia Teodora Ravenna (1999–2000)
- (Italy) Rio Marsì Pa (2000–2001)
- (Italy) Pallavolo Palermo (2001–2002)
- (Spain) Universidad de Burgos (2002–2003)
- (Italy) Gelati Gelma Seap Aragona (2003–2004)
- (Dominican Republic) Mirador (2006)
- (Italy) Zoppas Industries Conegliano (2006–2007)
- (Italy) Infotel Banca Di Forlì (2007–2008)
- (Dominican Republic) Distrito Nacional (2008)
- (Italy) Riso Scotti Pavia (2008–2009)

== Awards ==
=== Individuals ===
- 2000 USA Open Championships "All-Tournament Team"
- 2008 Dominican Volleyball League "Best Attacker"

=== Clubs ===
- 2003 Spanish Queen Cup – Runner-Up, with Universidad de Burgos
- 2006 Dominican Republic Distrito Nacional Superior Tournament – Champion, with Mirador
- 2008 Dominican Republic Volleyball League – Champion, with Distrito Nacional
