= Annerys Vargas =

Dominican volleyball player

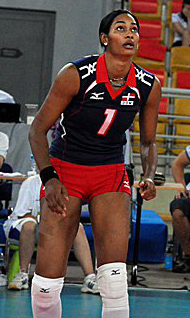

Personal information
- Full name: Annerys Victoria Vargas Valdez
- Born: August 7, 1981 (age 45); Santo Domingo, Dominican Republic
- Hometown: Santo Domingo
- Height: 1.94 m (6 ft 4 in)
- Weight: 70 kg (154 lb)
- Spike: 327 cm (129 in)
- Block: 320 cm (126 in)

Volleyball information
- Position: Middle blocker

National team
1998-2021	Dominican Republic
Honours
Women's volleyball
Representing the Dominican Republic
Pan American Games
Gold medal – first place	2019 Lima	Team
Gold medal – first place	2003 Santo Domingo	Team
Bronze medal – third place	2015 Toronto	Team
World Grand Champions Cup
Bronze medal – third place	2009 Tokyo/Fukuoka	Team
Pan-American Cup
Gold medal – first place	2016 Santo Domingo	Team
Gold medal – first place	2010 Rosarito/Tijuana	Team
Gold medal – first place	2008 Mexicali/Tijuana	Team
Silver medal – second place	2018 Santo Domingo	Team
Silver medal – second place	2017 Cañete/Lima	Team
Silver medal – second place	2011 Ciudad Juárez	Team
Silver medal – second place	2009 Miami	Team
Silver medal – second place	2005 Santo Domingo	Team
Bronze medal – third place	2007 Colima	Team
Bronze medal – third place	2006 San Juan	Team
Central American and Caribbean Games
Gold medal – first place	2002 San Salvador	Team
Gold medal – first place	2006 Cartagena	Team
Gold medal – first place	2010 Mayagüez	Team
Gold medal – first place	2014 Veracruz	Team
NORCECA Championship
Gold medal – first place	2009 Bayamón	Team
Silver medal – second place	2011 Caguas	Team
Silver medal – second place	2013 Omaha	Team
Bronze medal – third place	2003 Santo Domingo	Team
Bronze medal – third place	2005 Port of Spain	Team
Bronze medal – third place	2007 Winnipeg	Team
Final Four Cup
Silver medal – second place	2008 Fortaleza	Team
Bronze medal – third place	2009 Lima	Team
- Last updated: May 2022

Annerys Victoria Vargas Valdez (born August 7, 1981) is a retired female volleyball player from the Dominican Republic who won four consecutive gold medals at the Central American and Caribbean Games.

== Career ==
=== 2003 ===
Vargas won gold medal with the women's national team at the 2003 Pan American Games in her home town Santo Domingo, Dominican Republic. She was selected as the Best Server and Best Blocker. Later that year, she won the bronze medal at the 2003 NORCECA Championship, and was selected as the Best Blocker.

=== 2004 ===
Vargas played as a middle blocker and competed at the 2004 Summer Olympics for her native country, which finished in 11th place.

Playing with the Dominican club Los Cachorros, Vargas finished the 2004 season of the Superior Tournament as the First Runner-Up, after losing to Mirador in the final series.

=== 2005 ===
Vargas joined the Puerto Rican professional team Vaqueras de Bayamón from the LVSF for the 2005 season. She was selected among the "Offensive Team".

=== 2006 ===
In her second season with the Bayamón team, Vargas was selected as the "Best Blocker" and as an "All-Star" for the 2006 season. While playing a game Puerto Rico, where she was seen as an idol, she lost a shoe and a fan jumped to the court and picked it up, forcing her to finish the game with just one shoe.

At the volleyball tournament during the 2006 Central American and Caribbean Games, Vargas won the "Most Valuable Player", "Best Blocker" and "Best Server" awards and with her team the gold medal. After a successful 2006 season, she won the Dominican Republic "Volleyball Athlete of the Year" award.

=== 2007 ===
Playing with the Spanish team Grupo 2002 Murcia, Vargas won the Supercup, Queen Cup, and Spanish Superliga. After winning the Superliga, she celebrated with her team by taking a bath at Murcia's Plaza Circular. In the same season, she won the 2007 CEV Top Teams Cup.

=== 2008 ===
Vargas participated at the 2008 FIVB Women's World Olympic Qualification Tournament, and her team finished in 4th place failing to qualify to the 2008 Summer Olympics. She was selected tournament's "Best Blocker".

Vargas won the 2008 CEV Challenge Cup with Vakifbank Gunes Sigorta Stambuł and was awarded "Best Blocker".

=== 2009 ===
Vargas played with Criollas de Caguas from the Puerto Rican LVSF for the 2009 season, helping her team to reach the quarterfinals.

After winning the gold medal at the 2009 NORCECA Championship, Vargas qualified for the very first time for the 2009 World Grand Champions Cup, where her team won the bronze medal.

For the 2009–2010 season, Vargas played for the club Usiminas/Minas, from the Superliga Brasileira de Voleibol.

=== 2010 ===
Vargas finished the 2009–2010 season of the Brazilian Superliga as the fourth best blocker.

With the national team, Vargas won the gold medal at the 2010 Pan-American Cup held in Rosarito and Tijuana, Mexico.

In Mayagüez, Puerto Rico, Vargas was the recipient of the "Best Blocker" award during the volleyball tournament at the 2010 Central American and Caribbean Games won by her home team.

Vargas joined the Dominican Republic club Mirador to play at the 2010 FIVB World Club Championship, where her team finished in fourth place after being defeated by Bergamo for the bronze medal. Vargas won the "Best Blocker" award.

=== 2011-retirement ===
Vargas was selected 2017 Volleyball Player of the Year by her National Federation.

Vargas played the 2018 season at Dominican Republic Superior Volleyball League from the National District, joining the team Caribeñas VC. She became league champion and was awarded Best Blocker. During the 2019 season, she helped Caribeñas VC to finish second place in the league.

For the 2021–22 season, Vargas joined the Republic of China's Enterprise Volleyball League team CMFC Volleyball, and had matches suspended due to COVID-19 pandemic restrictions in Taiwan. She led her team to qualify to the league's playoff, but they lost 0–3 to Taipei King Whale in the knockout round and could not make it to the semifinals, finishing in fourth place.

Vargas announced her retirement on May 5, 2022, sending a letter to the women's national team director, Cristobal Marte, ending a 25-year career. Her career began in 1998, and encompassed three Olympic Games, five World Championships, five World Cups, five Pan American Games, and five Central American and Caribbean Games.

== Clubs ==
- (Dominican Republic) Simón Bolívar (1996–1998)
- (Dominican Republic) Modeca (1999–2002)
- (Dominican Republic) Los Cachorros (2003–2004)
- (Dominican Republic) Modeca (2005)
- (Dominican Republic) Bameso (2006)
- (Puerto Rico) Vaqueras de Bayamón (2005–2006)
- (Spain) Grupo 2002 Murcia (2006–2007)
- (Turkey) Vakifbank Gunes Sigorta Stambuł (2007–2008)
- (Dominican Republic) La Romana (2008)
- (Puerto Rico) Criollas de Caguas (2009)
- (Brazil) Usiminas/Minas (2009–2010)
- (Dominican Republic) Mirador (2010)
- (Puerto Rico) Criollas de Caguas (2011–2012)
- (Azerbaijan) Azeryol Baku (2013–2014)
- (Italy) River Volley Piacenza (2014–2015)
- (Dominican Republic) Caribeñas VC (2018–2019)
- (Taiwan) CMFC Volleyball (2021/22)

== Awards ==
=== Individuals ===
- 2003 Pan-American Games "Best Server"
- 2003 Pan-American Games "Best Blocker"
- 2003 NORCECA Championship "Best Blocker"
- 2005 Puerto Rican League, "Offensive Team"
- 2006 Puerto Rican League, "All-Star"
- 2006 Puerto Rican League, "Best Blocker"
- 2006 Central American and Caribbean Games "Most Valuable Player"
- 2006 Central American and Caribbean Games "Best Blocker"
- 2006 Central American and Caribbean Games "Best Server"
- 2006 Dominican Republic "Volleyball Player of the Year"
- 2008 Olympic Qualifier "Best Blocker"
- 2007-08 CEV Challenge Cup "Best Blocker"
- 2010 Central American and Caribbean Games "Best Blocker"
- 2010 World Club Championship "Best Blocker"
- 2012 Summer Olympics NORCECA qualification tournament's "Best Blocker"
- 2013 Dominican Republic "Volleyball Player of the Year"
- 2013–14 Azerbaijan Super League "Best Blocker"
- 2014 Central American and Caribbean Games "Best Middle Blocker"
- 2017 Dominican Republic "Volleyball Player of the Year"
- 2018 Dominican Republic Superior Volleyball League, "Best Blocker"

=== Clubs ===
- 2004 Dominican Republic Distrito Nacional Superior Tournament – Runner-Up, with Los Cachorros
- 2006 Spanish Supercup – Champion, with Grupo 2002 Murcia
- 2007 CEV Top Teams Cup – Champion, with Grupo 2002 Murcia
- 2007 Spanish Queen's Cup – Champion, with Grupo 2002 Murcia
- 2007 Spanish Superliga – Champion, with Grupo 2002 Murcia
- 2008 CEV Challenge Cup – Champion, with VakıfBank Güneş Sigorta Istanbul
- 2011 Puerto Rican League – Champion, with Criollas de Caguas
- 2012 Puerto Rican League – Runner-Up, with Criollas de Caguas
- 2013–14 Azerbaijan Super League – Runner-Up, Azeryol Baku
- 2014 Italian Supercup – Champion, with River Piacenza
- 2018 Dominican Republic Superior Volleyball League – Champion, with Caribeñas VC
- 2019 Dominican Republic Superior Volleyball League – Runner-Up, with Caribeñas VC
