= Germán Recio =

Personal information
- Full name: Germán Ricardo Recio Cuevas
- Nationality: Dominican Republic
- Born: 7 April 1988 (age 38); Neyba, Dominican Republic
- Hometown: Santo Domingo
- Height: 1.93 m (6 ft 4 in)
- Weight: 80 kg (180 lb)
- Spike: 342 cm (135 in)
- Block: 325 cm (128 in)

Beach volleyball information

Current teammate
Years	Teammate
2009	Yewddys Pérez

Best results
Years	Location	Result
2009	Montelimar	Bronze
Honours
Representing Dominican Republic
Men's beach volleyball
NORCECA Beach Volleyball Circuit
Bronze medal – third place	2009 Montelimar	Beach
Men's volleyball
Pan-American Cup
Bronze medal – third place	2008 Winnipeg	Team
Central American and Caribbean Games
Gold medal – first place	2014 Veracruz	Team

Germán Ricardo Recio Cuevas (born 7 April 1988 in Neyba) is a male volleyball and beach volleyball player from Dominican Republic, who participated in the NORCECA Beach Volleyball Circuit 2009 with Yewddys Pérez.

At indoor volleyball, he earned the bronze medal at the 2008 Pan-American Cup with his national team.

He also earned two second places with Bahoruco at the Dominican Republic Volleyball League.

== Clubs ==
- (Dominican Republic) Bahoruco (2007–2008)
- (Dominican Republic) Bahoruco (2010)
- (Dominican Republic) Puñal (2010)
- (Dominican Republic) La Romana (2013)

== Awards ==
=== Individuals ===
- 2014 Central American and Caribbean Games "Best Middle Blocker"

=== National team ===
==== Indoor ====
- 2008 Pan-American Cup Bronze Medal

==== Beach Volleyball ====
- NORCECA Beach Volleyball Circuit Montelimar 2009 Bronze Medal

=== Clubs ===
- Dominican Republic Volleyball League 2007 & 2008 – Runner-Up, with Bahoruco
