= Cinthia Piñeiro =

Dominican volleyball player (born 1986)

Personal information
- Full name: Cinthia Josefina Piñeiro Torres
- Nationality: Dominican Republic
- Born: February 4, 1986 (age 40); Santo Domingo, Dominican Republic
- Height: 1.83 m (6 ft 0 in)
- Weight: 60 kg (130 lb)

Beach volleyball information
Years	Teammate	Tours (points)
2007	Rosalin Angeles	30

Best results
Years	Location	Result
2006	Boca Chica	1st

Cinthia Josefina Piñeiro Torres (born February 4, 1986, in Santo Domingo) is a volleyball and beach volleyball player from Dominican Republic, who participated in the NORCECA Beach Volleyball Circuit 2007 with Ysaires Restituyo finishing in 9th place.

She won the gold medal of the Dominican Republic National Championship 2006, partnering Rosalin Angeles.

== Clubs ==
- (Dominican Republic) Bameso (2003)
- (Dominican Republic) Mirador (2004–2005)
