= Monte Plata Men (volleyball club) =

Male volleyball team

Monte Plata
- Full name: Monte Plata Men
- Founded: 2007
- Ground: Polideportivo; Monte Plata
- Chairman: (Dominican Republic) Fernando Gomez
- Head Coach: (Dominican Republic) Luis Gonzalez
- League: Dominican Volleyball League

Monte Plata is the professional male volleyball team representing Monte Plata Province.

== History ==
The team was founded in 2007.

== Current volleyball squad ==
As of December 2008

| Number | Player | Position |
|---|---|---|
| 1 | (Dominican Republic) Roberto De La Rosa | |
| 2 | (Dominican Republic) Juan Aquino | |
| 3 | (Dominican Republic) Yan Guzman | |
| 4 | (Dominican Republic) Lorenzo Polanco | |
| 5 | (Dominican Republic) Aneudy Cabulla | |
| 6 | (Dominican Republic) Edwin Peguero | |
| 7 | (Dominican Republic) Melvin Rincon | |
| 8 | (Dominican Republic) Gabriel Perez | |
| 9 | (Dominican Republic) Franklin Gonzalez | |
| 10 | (Dominican Republic) Ramon Castro | |
| 11 | (Dominican Republic) Eduardo Feliz | |
| 12 | (Dominican Republic) Wilian Gotoy | |
| 13 | (Dominican Republic) Ricardo Rijo | |
| 14 | (Dominican Republic) Luis Aquino | |
| 15 | (Dominican Republic) Cesar Severino | |
| 18 | (Dominican Republic) Yhonastan Fabian | |

- Coach: (Dominican Republic) Luis Gonzalez
- Assistant coach: (Dominican Republic) Cristian Polanco
