= Barahona Men (volleyball club) =

Barahona
- Full name: Barahona Men
- Founded: 2007
- Ground: Techado; Barahona, Dominican Republic
- Chairman: (Dominican Republic) Alexandra Urbaez
- Head Coach: (Dominican Republic) Franklin Segura
- League: Dominican Volleyball League

Barahona is the professional male volleyball team representing Barahona Province.

== History ==
The team was found in 2007.

== Current volleyball squad ==
As of December 2008

Number	Player	Position
1	(Dominican Republic) Ambioris Paulino	
2	(Dominican Republic) Jesus Perez	
3	(Dominican Republic) Carlos Cornielle	
4	(Dominican Republic) Dangel Alcantara	
5	(Dominican Republic) Cesar Alcantara	
6	(Dominican Republic) Oscar Alcantara	
7	(Dominican Republic) Kitzer Urbaez	
8	(Dominican Republic) Alfredo Baez	
9	(Dominican Republic) Wilman Duval	
10	(Dominican Republic) Cesar Font	
11	(Dominican Republic) Jose Matos	
12	(Dominican Republic) Miguel Angel Segura	
13	(Dominican Republic) Jesus Pineda	
14	(Dominican Republic) Yoelmin Mendez	
15	(Dominican Republic) Jose Antonio Espinal	
16	(Dominican Republic) George Luis Urbaez	
17	(Dominican Republic) Yermin Geraldo	
18	(Dominican Republic) Yamel Feliz	

- Coach: (Dominican Republic) Franklin Segura
- Assistant coach: (Dominican Republic) Keisy Feliz
