= Santo Domingo Men (volleyball club) =

Santo Domingo
- Full name: Santo Domingo Men
- Founded: 2007
- Ground: National Volleyball Pavilion; Santo Domingo, Dominican Republic (Capacity: 6.000)
- Chairman: (Dominican Republic) Robinson Guzmán
- Head Coach: (Dominican Republic) Jorge Mercedes
- League: Dominican Volleyball League
- 2008: 8th place

Santo Domingo is the male volleyball team of Santo Domingo.

== History ==
The team was founded in 2007.

== Current volleyball squad ==
As of December 2008

#	Name	Date of Birth	Weight	Height	Spike	Block
1	Luis Rivera
2	Edwin Hernandez
3	Angel Castro
4	Johan Lopez	April 16/1989	100	201	356	335
5	Milciades Tineo
6	Armando Villanueva
7	Ramon Lopez
8	Francisco Reinoso
9	Johnatan Sanchez
10	Joaquin Andujar
11	Eddy Lassis
12	Johnatan Medina
13	César Canario

Coach: (Dominican Republic) Jorge Mercedez

Assistant coach: (Dominican Republic) Bonilla R.
