= San Pedro de Macorís (volleyball club) =

San Pedro
- Full name: San Pedro de Macorís
- Founded: 2008
- Ground: Polideportivo; San Pedro, Dominican Republic
- Chairman: (Dominican Republic) Sobeida Casique
- Head Coach: (Dominican Republic) Guarionex Martínez
- League: Dominican Volleyball League
- 2008: 7th place

San Pedro is the top female volleyball team of San Pedro de Macorís.

== History ==
The team was founded in 2007.
