= Ysaires Restituyo =

Dominican Republic beach volleyball player

Personal information
- Nationality: Dominican Republic
- Born: Dominican Republic
Beach volleyball information
Current teammate
Years	Teammate	Tours (points)
2009	Ana Ligia Fabian	55

Ysaires Restituyo is a female beach volleyball player from Dominican Republic, who played in the NORCECA Beach Volleyball Circuit 2007 with Cinthia Piñeiro, 2008, with Ingrid Carmona and 2009 with Ana Ligia Fabian; at Santo Domingo, Dominican Republic.
