= San Cristóbal (volleyball club) =

- Full name: San Cristóbal Women
- Founded: 2007
- Ground: Polideportivo; San Cristóbal, Dominican Republic
- Chairman: (Dominican Republic) Valentín Pérez
- Head Coach: (Dominican Republic) Eddy Moya Marte
- League: Dominican Volleyball League
- 2008: 2nd place

San Cristóbal is the top female volleyball team of San Cristóbal, Dominican Republic.

== History ==
The team was founded in 2007 playing the league inaugural season and the team reached the semifinal round after posting a 6-6 mark in the regular round, settling with the fourth place. In the 2008 edition of the National League, the club lost to National District in the finals to earn the second place.

== 2008 squad ==
As of December 2008

Number	Player	Position	Height (m)	Birth date
3	(Dominican Republic) Teanny Cabral			
4	(Dominican Republic) Solangel Aquino	Wing Spiker	1.83	29/09/1989
5	(Dominican Republic) Esleyni Serrano	Setter		
6	(Dominican Republic) Lourdes German	Wing Spiker		
7	(Dominican Republic) Brenda Castillo	Libero	1.67	05/06/1992
8	(Dominican Republic) Valeria Castillo	Libero		
9	(Dominican Republic) Julissa Serrano	Setter		
10	(Dominican Republic) Heydi Jiménez	Middle Blocker		
11	(Dominican Republic) Estefany Andujar			
12	(Dominican Republic) Juana Saviñón	Wing Spiker	1.81	13/09/1980
13	(Dominican Republic) Janet Pérez	Opposite		
15	(Dominican Republic) Cosiri Rodríguez	Opposite	1.91	30/08/1977

Coach: (Dominican Republic) Eddy Moya Marte

Assistant coach: (Dominican Republic) Julio Baldera

== Palmares ==
=== National competition ===
National league 2007 - 4th Place
2008 - 2nd Place
