= Carmen Rosa Caso =

Volleyball player from the Dominican Republic

Rosa Caso

Personal information
- Full name: Carmen Rosa Caso Sierra
- Nationality: Dominican Republic
- Born: November 29, 1981 (age 44); Santo Domingo
- Hometown: Santo Domingo
- Height: 1.68 m (5 ft 6 in)
- Weight: 59 kg (130 lb)
- Spike: 243 cm (96 in)
- Block: 241 cm (95 in)

Volleyball information
- Position: Libero
- Number: 6

National team
2005 -	Dominican Republic
Honours
Women's volleyball
Representing the Dominican Republic
World Grand Champions Cup
Bronze medal – third place	2009 Tokyo/Fukuoka	Team
Pan-American Cup
Gold medal – first place	2008 Mexicali/Tijuana	Team
Bronze medal – third place	2006 San Juan	Team
Bronze medal – third place	2007 Colima	Team
NORCECA Championship
Bronze medal – third place	2007 Winnipeg	Team
Central American and Caribbean Games
Gold medal – first place	2006 Cartagena	Team
- Last updated: October 2011

Carmen Rosa Caso Sierra (born November 29, 1981, in Santo Domingo) is a retired volleyball player from the Dominican Republic, who won the bronze medal with the Dominican women's national team at the 2007 NORCECA Championship. She also became "Best Libero" of the event.

== Career ==
At the volleyball tournament during the 2006 Central American and Caribbean Games, she won the "Best Libero" award and the gold medal.

She became the "Best Defender" of the 2006 TV Azteca's Women Stars Volleyball Cup, played in Monterrey, Mexico, and won by the team with a perfect record in 5 matches.

At the 2007 Pan-American Cup she took the bronze medal with the National Team and also the "Best Libero" award. Later that year, she won this same award at the 2007 NORCECA Championship.

Rosa joined Mirador to play the 2011 FIVB Women's Club World Championship, and her team finished in 4th place after losing the Bronze Medal match to the Brazilian team Sollys/Nestle.

== Clubs ==
- (Dominican Republic) Arlenis Cordero (-2004)
- (Dominican Republic) Mirador (2005–2006)
- (Dominican Republic) Distrito Nacional (2007–2010)
- (Dominican Republic) Mirador (2010–2011)

== Awards ==
=== Individuals ===
- 2006 Central American and Caribbean Games "Best Libero"
- 2006 TV Azteca's Women Stars Volleyball Cup "Best Receiver"
- 2006 TV Azteca's Women Stars Volleyball Cup "Best Defender"
- 2007 Pan-American Cup "Best Libero"
- 2007 NORCECA Championship "Best Libero"
- 2007 Pan-American Games "Best Libero"
- 2008 Dominican Volleyball League "Best Libero"
