= Santo Domingo Women =

Santo Domingo
- Full name: Santo Domingo Women
- Founded: 2007
- Ground: National volleyball Pavilion; Santo Domingo, Dominican Republic (Capacity: 6000)
- Chairman: (Dominican Republic) Yovanny Sibilia
- Head Coach: (Cuba) Enrique Larrazaleta
- League: Dominican Volleyball League
- 2008: 6th

Santo Domingo is the top female volleyball team of Santo Domingo.

== History ==
The team was founded in 2007.

== Current volleyball squad ==
As of December 2008

Number	Player	Position	Height (m)	Birth date
1	(Dominican Republic) Yeniffer Ramírez		1.83	17/03/1993
2	(Dominican Republic) Estefanía De Jesús			
3	(Dominican Republic) Cándida Arias	Middle Blocker	1.91	11/03/1992
4	(Dominican Republic) Soledad Heredia			
5	(Dominican Republic) Laura George			
7	(Dominican Republic) Alicia Basilenni Moreno		1.78	25/04/1992
8	(Dominican Republic) Erica Pineda			
9	(Dominican Republic) Andrea Soriano			
10	(Dominican Republic) Yakaira Peña			
12	(Dominican Republic) Gabriela Reyes	Setter	1.75	6/11/1992
13	(Dominican Republic) Marianne Fersola	Middle Blocker	1.80	16/01/1992
14	(Dominican Republic) Ana Yorkira Binet	Libero	1.74	9/02/1992
15	(Dominican Republic) Rosa Hernández			

Coach: (Cuba) Enrique Larrazaleta

Assistant coach: (Dominican Republic) Juan Capellan

== Palmares ==
=== National competition ===
National league

None
