= Bahoruco (volleyball club) =

- Full name: Bahoruco Men
- Founded: 2007
- Ground: Polideportivo; Bahoruco
- Chairman: (Dominican Republic) Pedro Díaz
- Head Coach: (Dominican Republic) Elias Geraldo
- League: Dominican Volleyball League
- 2008: 2nd place

The Bahoruco is the male volleyball team of Bahoruco.

== History ==
The team was founded in 2007.

== Current volleyball squad ==
As of December 2008

#	Name	Date of birth	Weight	Height	Spike	Block
1	Yewddys Pérez (c)
2	Wagner Geraldo
3	Eli Contreras
4	Beiker Nueno
5	Germán Recio	07.04.1988	80	193	342	325
6	Alberto Reyes
7	Pedro Pérez
8	Waner De León
9	Felipe Figuereo
10	Yonathan Encarnación
11	Maicol González
12	Juan Carlos Cabrera
13	Pascual Figuereo
14	Yhonastan Fabian	18.03.1984	80	180	315	290
15	Wilminson Bueno
16	Elvis D. Contreras
17	Victor Batista
18	Elvis Contreras	16.05.1984	75	185	345	320

Coach: (Dominican Republic) Elias Geraldo

Assistant coach: (Dominican Republic) José Ventura

== Release or Transfer ==
Number	Player	Position
14	Wilfredo Hernández	Wing Spiker

== Palmares ==
=== National competition ===
National league Runner-Up: 2

2007 & 2008
