= Espaillat Men (volleyball club) =

Espaillat
- Full name: Espaillat Men
- Founded: 2007
- Ground: Polideportivo; Espaillat, Dominican Republic
- Chairman: (Dominican Republic) Ercilia Jaquez
- Head Coach: (Dominican Republic) Guillermo Gómez
- League: Dominican Volleyball League
- 2008: 5th place

Santo Domingo is the male volleyball team of Espaillat.

== History ==
The team was founded in 2007.

== Current squad ==
As of December 2008

#	Name	Date of Birth	Weight	Height	Spike	Block
1	Amaury Severino
2	Pedro Luis Garcia
3	Ricardo Ramirez
4	Roberto Duran
5	Jorge Luis Ureña
6	Julio Gamalier
7	Edward Jose Santana
8	Jose Virgilio Jimenez
9	German Feliz Garcia
10	Joaquin Andujar
11	Rodolfo Guzman
12	Felipe Henriquez Díaz	16.09.1977	77	183	330	310
14	Juan Díaz Gómez
15	David Caraballo
16	Charlin Vargas
17	Isaias Minaya
18	Hilariun Monción	21.10.1979	70	182	314	290

Coach: (Dominican Republic) Guillermo Gómez

Assistant coach: (Dominican Republic) Elvis Cepeda

== Release or Transfer ==
Number	Player	Position
13	William Sánchez	Wing Spiker
