= San Juan de la Maguana (volleyball club) =

San Juan
- Full name: San Juan de la Maguana Women
- Founded: 2007
- Ground: Polideportivo; San Juan de la Maguana, Dominican Republic
- Chairman: (Dominican Republic) Pablo E. Pérez
- Head Coach: (Dominican Republic) Ruddi A. Valdez
- League: Dominican Volleyball League
- 2008: 8th place

San Juan is the top female volleyball team of San Juan de la Maguana.

== History ==
The team was found in 2007.

== Current volleyball squad ==
As of December 2008

Number	Player	Position	Height (m)	Birth date
1	(Dominican Republic) Yirandi Paniagua			
2	(Dominican Republic) Alejandra Félix			
3	(Dominican Republic) Sarah Canaria			
4	(Dominican Republic) Ana Karen Javier			
5	(Dominican Republic) Yadira Pérez			
6	(Dominican Republic) Gladys De Los Santos			
7	(Dominican Republic) Rosa Ureña			
8	(Dominican Republic) Ana Ligia Fabian	Wing Spiker	1.79	07/11/1988
9	(Dominican Republic) María Arnaud			
10	(Dominican Republic) Sheila Javier			
11	(Dominican Republic) Cristy Pimentel			
12	(Dominican Republic) Lourdes Valdez			
13	(Dominican Republic) Ingrid Díaz			
14	(Dominican Republic) Diteysi Mercedes			
15	(Dominican Republic) Damarias Beltré			
16	(Dominican Republic) Merlin Mateo			
17	(Dominican Republic) Warden Gedin			

Coach: (Dominican Republic) Ruddi A. Valdéz

Assistant coach: (Dominican Republic) Miqueas Moreta

== Palmares ==
=== National competition ===
National league

- None
