= Santiago (volleyball club) =

Women's volleyball team in Santiago, Dominican Republic

- Full name: Santiago
- Founded: 2007
- Ground: INVI Polideportivo; Santiago, Dominican Republic (Capacity: 1.500)
- Chairman: (Dominican Republic) José "Yeye" Aybar
- Head Coach: (Dominican Republic) Héctor "El Chino" Rodríguez
- League: Dominican Volleyball League
- 2008: 3rd place

The Santiago is the women's volleyball team of Santiago.

== History ==
The team was founded in 2007. They claimed the 2017 North Central ligue championship, after defeating La Vega in the final series; Angélica Hinojosa and Celenia Toribio were the key players for the victory.

== Current volleyball squad ==
As of December 2008

Number	Player	Position	Height (m)	Birth date
1	(Dominican Republic) Lisvel Elisa Eve	Middle blocker		
2	(Dominican Republic) Wisleidy Rodríguez			
3	(Dominican Republic) Gleny Almonte			
4	(Dominican Republic) Eunice Vargas			
5	(Dominican Republic) Faustina Silverio			
6	(Dominican Republic) Mabel Flete	Libero		
7	(Dominican Republic) Mariana Collado			
8	(Dominican Republic) Winifer Fernández			
9	(Dominican Republic) Mercedes García	Middle Blocker		
10	(Dominican Republic) Bethania Almánzar	Wing Spiker	1.80	11/02/1987
11	(Dominican Republic) Elizabeth García			
12	(Dominican Republic) Karla Echenique	Setter	1.79	16/05/1987
13	(Dominican Republic) Yurki Almonte	Wing Spiker		
14	(Dominican Republic) Dominga Peralta			
15	(Dominican Republic) Gregoria Polanco			

Coach: (Dominican Republic) Héctor Rodríguez

Assistant coach: (Dominican Republic) Roberto Balbuena

== Palmares ==
=== National competition ===
National league:

2007 - 3rd Place
2008 - 3rd Place
