= Distrito Nacional Men (volleyball club) =

Distrito Nacional
- Full name: Distrito Nacional Men
- Founded: 2007
- Ground: National Volleyball Pavilion; Santo Domingo, Dominican Republic (Capacity: 6.000)
- Chairman: (Dominican Republic) Cristian Cruz
- Head Coach: (Dominican Republic) Duglas Mayobanex
- League: Dominican Volleyball League
- 2010: 1st place

The Distrito Nacional is the professional male volleyball team representing Distrito Nacional.

== History ==
The team was found in 2007, the inaugural season of the Dominican Republic Volleyball League. This year the team won the championship, guided by Amaury Martínez who became Most Valuable Player. The 2008 season, repeated the League Championship, with Amaury being awarded MVP again.

For the 2010 season, the team won the third straight championship, this time with the help of Jose Miguel Caceres, who became Most Valuable Player.

== Current squad ==
As of December 2008

Number	Player	Position
1	(Dominican Republic) José Miguel Cáceres	Opposite
2	(Dominican Republic) Alexis Polanco	
3	(Dominican Republic) Neiby Polanco	Middle Blocker
4	(Dominican Republic) Cristian Cruz	Setter
5	(Dominican Republic) Francisco Guerrero	
6	(Dominican Republic) Hairo Hidalgo	
7	(Dominican Republic) Jhovany Disla	
8	(Dominican Republic) Eddy Campusano	
9	(Dominican Republic) Amaury Martínez	Wing Spiker
10	(Dominican Republic) Juan Antonio Pozo	Middle Blocker
11	(Dominican Republic) Arquimedes Garcia	
12	(Dominican Republic) Alberto Castro	
13	(Dominican Republic) Juan Fiallo	
14	(Dominican Republic) Francisco Abreu	
15	(Dominican Republic) Francisco Valdez	Middle Blocker
16	(Dominican Republic) Juan Eury Almonte	
17	(Dominican Republic) Johan Lopez	

- Coach: (Dominican Republic) Duglas Mayobanex
- Assistant coach: (Dominican Republic) Julio Frias

== Palmares ==
=== National competition ===
- 2007, 2008 & 2010 National League Championship
