= Volleyball at the 2006 Central American and Caribbean Games =

2006 Central American and Caribbean Games
Tournament details
- Host country: Colombia
- Dates: July 15 to July 30, 2006
- Teams: 8
- Venue: (in Cartagena host cities)

This page presents the results of the men's and women's volleyball tournament during the 2006 Central American and Caribbean Games, which was held 15–30 July in Cartagena, Colombia.

== Medal summary ==
Event	Gold	Silver	Bronze
Men's team	Puerto Rico; José Rivera; Gregory Berrios; Victor Rivera; Jose Quinones; Ángel Pérez; Rene Estivez; Victor Beir; Roberto Muñiz; Hector Soto; Alexis Matias; Luis Rodríguez; Enrique Escalante	Cuba*; Raidel Poey; Tomas Aldazabal; Jorge Sánchez Salgado; Yasser Portuondo; Yoandry Diaz; Pavel Pimienta; Michael Sánchez; Henry Bell Cisnero; Roberlandy Simon; Oriol Camejo; Odelvis Dominico	Venezuela; Ismel Ramos; Luis Infante; Carlos Luna; Luis Díaz; Enderwuin Herrera; Renzo Sanchez; Carlos Tejada; Iván Márquez; Thomas Ereu; Francisco Soteldo; Juan Blanco; Freddy Cedeno
Women's team	Dominican Republic; Annerys Vargas; Evelyn Carreras; Carmen Casso; Nurys Arias; Milagros Cabral; Juana Gonzalez; Karla Echenique; Cindy Rondon; Prisilla Rivera; Cosiris Rodriguez; Kenia Moreta; Bethania de la Cruz	Cuba; Yumilka Ruiz; Yanelis Santos; Nancy Carrillo; Daimi Ramirez; Lisbet Arredondo; Yaima Ortiz; Rachel Sanchez; Liana Mesa; Rosir Calderon; Anniara Munoz; Kenia Carcaces; Zoila Barros	Puerto Rico; Vilmarie Mojica; Tatiana Encarnacion; Yarleen Santiago; Eva Cruz; Aurea Cruz; Vanessa Velez; Karina Ocasio; Dariam Acevedo; Glorimar Ortega; Shannon Torregrosa; Alexandra Oquendo; Shelia Ocasio

* Osmany Juantorena was disqualified for doping.

== Men's tournament ==
=== Competing nation ===
Group A	Group B
Dominican Republic; Mexico; Cuba; Trinidad and Tobago	Puerto Rico; Venezuela; Colombia; Barbados

=== Preliminary round ===
==== Group A ====
Rk	Team	Points	W	L	SW	SL	Ratio	PW	PL	Ratio
1	Cuba	6	3	0	9	1	9.000	243	173	1.405
2	Dominican Republic	5	2	1	6	5	1.200	235	234	1.004
3	Mexico	4	1	2	6	6	1.000	267	258	1.035
4	Trinidad and Tobago	3	0	3	0	9	0.000	145	225	0.644

- July 24

Dominican Republic	3-0	Trinidad and Tobago	(25–22, 25–14, 25–18)
Cuba	3-1	Mexico	(25–20, 18–25, 25–19, 25–23)

- July 25

Trinidad and Tobago	0-3	Cuba	(9-25, 11–25, 14–25)
Mexico	2-3	Dominican Republic	(21–25, 25–21, 21–25, 25–22, 13–15)

- July 26

Trinidad and Tobago	0-3	Mexico	(17–25, 22–25, 18–25)
Dominican Republic	0-3	Cuba	(14–25, 19–25, 19–25)

==== Group B ====
Rk	Team	Points	W	L	SW	SL	Ratio	PW	PL	Ratio
1	Puerto Rico	6	3	0	9	1	9.000	265	221	1.199
2	Venezuela	5	2	1	7	4	1.750	277	246	1.126
3	Colombia	4	1	2	4	6	0.667	214	214	1.000
4	Barbados	3	0	3	0	9	0.000	152	227	0.670

- July 24

Venezuela	1-3	Puerto Rico	(21–25, 25–27, 31–29, 30–32)
Colombia	3-0	Barbados	(25–15, 25–15, 25–14)

- July 25

Puerto Rico	3-0	Barbados	(25–15, 27–25, 25–18)
Venezuela	3-1	Colombia	(25–22, 20–25, 25–13, 25–23)

- July 26

Barbados	0-3	Venezuela	(13–25, 18–25, 19–25)
Colombia	0-3	Puerto Rico	(15–25, 23–25, 18–25)

=== Classification match (7th/8th place) ===
- July 27

Trinidad and Tobago	3-1	Barbados	(25–23, 30–28, 25–27, 25–17)

=== Quarterfinals ===
- July 27

Venezuela	3-0	Mexico	(25–17, 25–19, 26–24)
Dominican Republic	3-0	Colombia	(25–23, 25–19, 25–19)

=== Classification match (5th/6th place) ===
- July 28

Mexico	3-0	Colombia	(26–24, 25–22, 25–19)

=== Final round ===
Semi-finals
2006-07-28 – Cartagena, Colombia
Cuba	3
Venezuela	0
2006-07-28 – Cartagena, Colombia
Puerto Rico	3
Dominican Republic	0

Final
2006-07-21 – Cartagena, Colombia
Cuba	0
Puerto Rico	3
3rd place
2006-07-21 – Cartagena, Colombia
Venezuela	3
Dominican Republic	2

==== Semifinals ====
- July 28

Cuba	3-0	Venezuela	(25–23, 25–23, 25–15)
Puerto Rico	3-0	Dominican Republic	(25–22, 25–17, 25–20)

==== Finals ====
===== Bronze-medal match =====
- July 29

Venezuela	3-2	Dominican Republic	(25–14, 20–25, 25–21, 22–25, 15–9)

===== Gold-medal match =====
- July 29

Cuba	0-3	Puerto Rico	(26–28, 22–25, 23–25)

=== Final standings ===
1. Puerto Rico
2. Cuba
3. Venezuela
4. Dominican Republic
5. Mexico
6. Colombia
7. Trinidad and Tobago
8. Barbados

2006 Central American and Caribbean Games winners

Puerto Rico
Second title

=== Awards ===
- Most valuable player:
  - Héctor Soto (PUR)
- Best digger:
  - Gregory Berríos (PUR)
- Best libero:
  - Gregory Berríos (PUR)
- Best setter:
  - Ángel Pérez (PUR)

== Women's tournament ==
=== Competing nation ===
Group A	Group B
Costa Rica; Mexico; Cuba; Puerto Rico	Dominican Republic; Venezuela; Colombia; Barbados

=== Preliminary round ===
==== Group A ====
Rk	Team	Points	W	L	SW	SL	Ratio	PW	PL	Ratio
1	Cuba	6	3	0	9	1	9.000	242	190	1.274
2	Puerto Rico	5	2	1	7	3	2.333	237	214	1.107
3	Mexico	4	1	2	3	6	0.500	182	191	0.953
4	Costa Rica	3	0	3	0	9	0.000	159	225	0.707

- July 16

Mexico	3-0	Costa Rica	(25–12, 25–15, 25–14)
Cuba	3-1	Puerto Rico	(25–23, 17–25, 25–21, 25–18)

- July 17

Costa Rica	0-3	Cuba	(17–25, 19–25, 16–25)
Puerto Rico	3-0	Mexico	(25–20, 25–20, 25–16)

- July 18

Puerto Rico	3-0	Costa Rica	(25–22, 25–23, 25–21)
Mexico	0-3	Cuba	(23–25, 17–25, 11–25)

==== Group B ====
Rk	Team	Points	W	L	SW	SL	Ratio	PW	PL	Ratio
1	Dominican Republic	6	3	0	9	0	MAX	226	157	1.439
2	Venezuela	5	2	1	6	3	2.000	218	195	1.118
3	Colombia	4	1	2	3	6	0.500	197	204	0.966
4	Barbados	3	0	3	0	9	0.000	141	226	0.624

- July 16

Dominican Republic	3-0	Venezuela	(25–21, 25–22, 26–24)
Colombia	3-0	Barbados	(25–16, 25–19, 25–19)

- July 17

Barbados	0-3	Venezuela	(14–25, 24–26, 17–25)
Dominican Republic	3-0	Colombia	(25–19, 25–17, 25–22)

- July 18

Barbados	0-3	Dominican Republic	(8-25, 11–25, 13–25)
Colombia	0-3	Venezuela	(21–25, 23–25, 20–25)

=== Classification match (7th/8th place) ===
- July 19

Costa Rica	3-0	Barbados	(25–22, 25–20, 25–18)

=== Quarterfinals ===
- July 19

Venezuela	0-3	Mexico	(19–25, 22–25, 17–25)
Puerto Rico	3-0	Colombia	(25–21, 25–16, 25–19)

=== Classification match (5th/6th place) ===
- July 20

Venezuela	3-2	Colombia	(25–20, 18–25, 21–25, 25–20, 16–14)

=== Final round ===
Semi-finals
2006-07-20 – Cartagena, Colombia
Cuba	3
Mexico	0
2006-07-20 – Cartagena, Colombia
Dominican Republic	3
Puerto Rico	1

Final
2006-07-21 – Cartagena, Colombia
Cuba	0
Dominican Republic	3
3rd place
2006-07-21 – Cartagena, Colombia
Mexico	0
Puerto Rico	3

==== Semifinals ====
- July 20

Cuba	3-0	Mexico	(25–18, 25–12, 25–12)
Dominican Republic	3-1	Puerto Rico	(25–17, 18–25, 35–33, 25–18)

==== Finals ====
===== Bronze-medal match =====
- July 21

Mexico	0-3	Puerto Rico	(12–25, 22–25, 24–26)

===== Gold-medal match =====
- July 21

Cuba	0-3	Dominican Republic	(30–32, 19–25, 22–25)

=== Final standings ===
1. Dominican Republic
2. Cuba
3. Puerto Rico
4. Mexico
5. Venezuela
6. Colombia
7. Costa Rica
8. Barbados

2006 Central American and Caribbean Games winners

Dominican Republic
Fourth title

=== Awards ===
- Most valuable player:
  - Annerys Vargas (DOM)
- Best attacker:
  - Eva Cruz (PUR)
- Best blocker:
  - Annerys Vargas (DOM)
- Best digger:
  - Sandra Montoya (COL)
- Best libero:
  - Carmen Rosa Caso (DOM)
- Best receiver:
  - Áurea Cruz (PUR)
- Best server:
  - Annerys Vargas (DOM)
- Best setter:
  - Juana Miguelina González (DOM)
- Best scorer:
  - Áurea Cruz (PUR)
