= José Miguel Cáceres =

Dominican Republic volleyball player

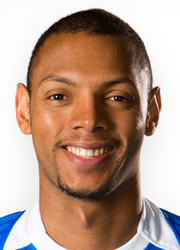
- Cáceres in 2012

Personal information
- Full name: José Miguel Cáceres Gómez
- Nickname: Clavito
- Nationality: Dominican
- Born: December 24, 1981 (age 44); Tamayo
- Hometown: Santo Domingo
- Height: 2.10 m (6 ft 10 1/2 in)
- Weight: 98 kg (216 lb)
- Spike: 385 cm (152 in)
- Block: 353 cm (139 in)

Volleyball information
- Position: Opposite
- Current club: Capitanes de Arecibo
- Number: 7

National team
2005–2014	Dominican Republic
Honours
Men's volleyball
Representing the Dominican Republic
Pan American Cup
Bronze medal – third place	2008 Winnipeg	Team
Bronze medal – third place	2009 Chiapas	Team
Bronze medal – third place	2012 Santo Domingo	Team
Central American and Caribbean Games
Gold medal – first place	2014 Veracruz	Team
- Last updated: October 2015

José Miguel Cáceres Gómez (born December 24, 1981, in Tamayo) is a men's volleyball player from the Dominican Republic, who won a bronze medal with the men's national team at the 2008 Pan American Cup in Winnipeg, Manitoba.

== Career ==
Cáceres won the "Most Valuable Player" at the 2004 Distrito Nacional Superior Tournament in Dominican Republic, helping Bameso to win the 19th Championship, defeating Los Prados in the 7th game of the final series.

Playing at the 2005 NORCECA Championship, his team finished in 4th place, and he was selected "Best spiker".

At the Dominican Republic Sport Gala of 2008 Cáceres was awarded "Volleyball Player of the Year". He then played with Distrito Nacional, to help them win the 2010 season Dominican Republic Volleyball League championship.

Cáceres signed the Spanish club CAI Voleibol Teruel for the 2010–2011 season, joining countrymate Víctor Batista.

For his performance during 2010, Cáceress was the recipient of the Dominican Republic "Volleyball Player of the Year".

For the 2010–11 season, Cáceres joined his friend and countrymate Víctor Batista at the Spaniard club CAI Voleibol Teruel, winning the 2011 King's Cup and the Superliga.

In June 2011, Cáceres signed with the Italian team Bre Banca Lannutti Cuneo to play the 2011–12 season with that club. He won the Best Scorer and the bronze medal at the 2012 Men's Pan-American Volleyball Cup. In August 2014 he announced that he would retire from the national team after the 2014 Central American and Caribbean Games. At these games, the Dominican Republic won the gold medal for the first time and Caceres were awarded Best Opposite Spiker. After this medal he joined his father José Cáceres who also won a medal, a silver in volleyball during the 1986 Central American and Caribbean Games.

Cáceres played the 2014–15 season with the Qatari Police Club, helping them to reach a second place in the Gulf Cup being named best opposite spiker and the league fourth place with a 15–5 mark. He then joined the Puerto Rican champions Capitanes de Arecibo for the 2015–16 season. He won the 2017 Pan-American Cup Best Opposite award, helping his national team to reach the sixth place.

== Clubs ==
- (Dominican Republic) Bameso (1997–2005)
- (Puerto Rico) Gigantes de Adjuntas (2006)
- (Spain) Arona Tenerife (2005–2007)
- (France) Stade Poitevin (2007–2009)
- (Puerto Rico) Indios de Mayagüez (2009–2010)
- (Dominican Republic) Distrito Nacional (2010)
- (Spain) CAI Voleibol Teruel (2010–2011)
- (Italy) Bre Banca Lannutti Cuneo (2011–2012)
- (Dominican Republic) Los Mina (2013)
- (Trinidad and Tobago) Technocrats (2013)
- (Qatar) Police Club (2014–2015)
- (Puerto Rico) Capitanes de Arecibo (2015–2016)
- (Bahrain) Al-Muharraq (2015–2016)

== Awards ==
=== Individuals ===
- 2004 Dominican Republic "Volleyball Player of the Year"
- 2005 NORCECA Championship "Best spiker"
- 2008 Dominican Republic "Volleyball Player of the Year"
- 2009 Dominican Republic "Volleyball Player of the Year"
- 2009 NORCECA Championship "Best scorer"
- 2010 Dominican Republic "Volleyball Player of the Year"
- 2012 Pan-American Cup "Best scorer"
- 2014 Central American and Caribbean Games "Best opposite spiker"
- 2015 Gulf Cup "Best Opposite Spiker"
- 2017 Pan-American Cup "Best opposite"

=== Clubs ===
- 2004 Dominican Republic Distrito Nacional Superior Tournament – Champion, with Bameso
- 2006-07 Spanish Superliga – Bronze medal, with Arona Tenerife
- 2007-08 French Championship – Runner-Up, with Stade Poitevin
- 2007-08 CEV Challenge Cup – Bronze medal, with Stade Poitevin
- 2010 Dominican Republic Volleyball League – Champion, with Distrito Nacional
- 2011 Spanish King's Cup – Champion, with CAI Voleibol Teruel
- 2010-11 Spanish Superliga – Champion, with CAI Voleibol Teruel
- 2013 Dominican Republic Santo Domingo Superior Tournament – Champion, with Los Mina
- 2015 Gulf Cup – Runner-Up, with Police Club
