= Espaillat Women =

Espaillat
- Full name: Espaillat Women
- Founded: 2007
- Ground: Polideportivo; Espaillat, Dominican Republic
- Chairman: (Dominican Republic) Julio Tavera
- Head Coach: (Dominican Republic) Ramón Cruz
- League: Dominican Volleyball League
- 2007: 7th place

Espaillat is the top female volleyball team of Espaillat.

== History ==
The team was found in 2007.

== Current volleyball squad ==
As of December 2008

Number	Player	Position	Height (m)	Birth date
1	(Dominican Republic) Dahiana Burgos	Wing Spiker	1.88	07/04/1986
2	(Dominican Republic) Eridania Veras			
3	(Dominican Republic) Siana María Ortíz			
4	(Dominican Republic) Sarah Camacho			
5	(Dominican Republic) Damari Batista			
6	(Dominican Republic) Karina Sosa			
7	(Dominican Republic) Madelin Díaz			
8	(Dominican Republic) Carmen Jiménez			
9	(Dominican Republic) Francisca Duarte			
10	(Dominican Republic) Kenia Abreu			
11	(Dominican Republic) Minelfi Cerda			
12	(Dominican Republic) Candy Ramos			
13	(Dominican Republic) Yamely Brito			
14	(Dominican Republic) Luz Nuñez Álvarez			
15	(Dominican Republic) Evelyn Carrera	Wing Spiker	1.82	05/10/1971
16	(Dominican Republic) Isaura Camacho			
17	(Dominican Republic) Alondra Moran			
18	(Dominican Republic) Marisela Guzmán			

Coach: (Dominican Republic) Ramón Cruz

Assistant coach: (Dominican Republic) Carlos Pérez

== Palmares ==
=== National competition ===
National league

- None
