= La Romana Women =

La Romana
- Full name: La Romana Women
- Founded: 2007
- Ground: Polideportivo Leoncio Mercedes; La Romana, Dominican Republic
- Chairman: (Dominican Republic) Amos Anglada
- Head Coach: (Dominican Republic) Mamerto Fernández
- League: Dominican Volleyball League
- 2007: 2nd place

La Romana is the top female volleyball team of La Romana.

== History ==
The team was founded in 2007.

== Current volleyball squad ==
As of December 2008

Number	Player	Position	Height (m)	Birth date
1	(Dominican Republic) Trianny Beltrán			
2	(Dominican Republic) Karen Basilio	Setter		
3	(Dominican Republic) Raquel Ferrán			
4	(Dominican Republic) Kahory Féliz			
5	(Dominican Republic) Alkalidia Castillo	Wing Spiker		
6	(Dominican Republic) Aracelis Mercedes			
7	(Dominican Republic) Santa Guzmán	Middle Blocker		
8	(Dominican Republic) Hislem Asencio			
9	(Dominican Republic) Biolis Florentino	Wing Spiker		
10	(Dominican Republic) Katherine Henríquez	Setter		
11	(Dominican Republic) Norma Román			
12	(Dominican Republic) Erasma Moreno			
13	(Dominican Republic) Francis Javier			
14	(Dominican Republic) Rosa Medrano	Middle Blocker		
15	(Dominican Republic) Annerys Vargas	Middle Blocker	1.93	07/08/1981
16	(Dominican Republic) Michel Torres	Middle Blocker		
17	(Dominican Republic) Ceilin King Marte			
18	(Dominican Republic) Jenny Paulino			

Coach: (Dominican Republic) Mamerto Fernández

Assistant coach: (Dominican Republic) Aramis Arredondo

== Palmares ==
=== National competition ===
National league

2007 - 2nd Place
