= Sánchez Ramírez (volleyball club) =

- Full name: Sánchez Ramírez Men
- Founded: 2007
- Chairman: (Dominican Republic) Manuel Marte
- Head Coach: (Dominican Republic) Vicente Paniagua
- League: Dominican Volleyball League
- 2008: 3rd place

The Sánchez Ramírez is the male volleyball team of Sánchez Ramírez.

== History ==
The team was founded in 2007.

== Current volleyball squad ==
As of December 2008

| # | Name | Date of Birth | Weight | Height | Spike | Block |
|---|---|---|---|---|---|---|
| 1 | Elnis Palomino | 02.07.1986 | 85 | 185 | 374 | 322 |
| 2 | Carlos Manuel Velásquez | 08.12.1985 | 68 | 170 |
| 3 | Hayden Reynoso |
| 4 | Tomy Almanzar |
| 5 | Miguel Angel Vargas |
| 6 | Teodoro Fermin Galan |
| 7 | Jesus Pineda |
| 8 | Jorge Luis Galva | 24.09.1988 | 97 | 196 | 335 | 321 |
| 9 | Freddy De Los Santos |
| 10 | Miguel Duran |
| 11 | Rafael Ventura |
| 12 | Johny Cepeda |
| 13 | Melvin Frias |
| 14 | Manuel Lara |
| 15 | Ezequiel Castillo |
| 16 | Rainel Figueroa |
| 17 | Edwin Vargas |
| 18 | Junior Batista |

Coach: (Dominican Republic) Vicente Paniagua

Assistant coach: (Dominican Republic) Jose Evangelista
