= Distrito Nacional Women =

Distrito Nacional
- Full name: Distrito Nacional Women
- Founded: 2007
- Ground: National Volleyball Pavilion; Santo Domingo, Dominican Republic (Capacity: 6.000)
- Chairman: (Dominican Republic) Ricardo Arias
- Head Coach: (Dominican Republic) Wilson Sánchez
- League: Dominican Volleyball League
- 2008: 1st place

The Distrito Nacional is the female volleyball team of Distrito Nacional.

== History ==
The team was founded in 2007.

== Current volleyball squad ==
As of December 2008

Number	Player	Position	Height (m)	Birth date
2	(Dominican Republic) Lorena Rosario			
3	(Dominican Republic) Carla Montilla			
4	(Dominican Republic) Gina Selmo	Setter	1.89	12/05/1986
5	(Dominican Republic) Marifranchi Rodríguez	Middle Blocker	1.80	29/08/1984
6	(Dominican Republic) Ginnette Selmo	Middle Blocker	1.91	12/05/1986
7	(Dominican Republic) Camil Domínguez	Setter		
8	(Dominican Republic) Nuris Arias	Wing Spiker	1.91	20/05/1973
9	(Dominican Republic) Niverka Marte	Setter	1.78	19/10/1990
10	(Dominican Republic) Jeoselyna Rodríguez	Opposite	1.84	09/12/1991
11	(Dominican Republic) Carmen Rosa Caso	Libero	1.68	29/11/1981
13	(Dominican Republic) Laritza Reyes	Middle Blocker	1.82	30/09/1982
17	(Dominican Republic) Niverka Toribio			

Coach: (Dominican Republic) Wilson Sánchez

Assistant coach: (Brazil) Wagner Pacheco

== Palmares ==
=== National competition ===
National league: 2

2007 & 2008
