= Volleyball at the 2002 Central American and Caribbean Games =

This page presents the results of the Men's and Women's Volleyball Tournament during the 2002 Central American and Caribbean Games, which was held from November 28 to December 8, 2002 in San Salvador, El Salvador.

== Men's tournament ==
=== Final standings ===
1. Puerto Rico
2. Mexico
3. Venezuela

2006 Central American and Caribbean Games winners

Puerto Rico
First title

== Women's tournament ==
=== Competing nations ===
Group A	Group B
El Salvador; Mexico; Nicaragua; Puerto Rico	Dominican Republic; Venezuela; Costa Rica; Barbados

=== Preliminary round ===
==== Group A ====
Rk	Team	Points	W	L	SW	SL	Ratio	PW	PL	Ratio
1	Puerto Rico	6	3	0	9	3	3.000	275	203	1.354
2	Mexico	5	2	1	8	3	2.667	243	189	1.286
3	Nicaragua	4	1	2	4	7	0.571	205	248	0.827
4	El Salvador	3	0	3	1	9	0.111	160	243	0.658

- November 29

Mexico	2-3	Puerto Rico	(25-16, 25-23, 19-25, 18-25, 6-15)
El Salvador	1-3	Nicaragua	(25-18, 21-25, 13-25, 18-25)

- December 1

El Salvador	0-3	Mexico	(13-25, 8-25, 14-25)
Puerto Rico	3-1	Nicaragua	(25-17, 25-13, 21-25, 25-7)

- December 3

Puerto Rico	3-0	El Salvador	(25-19, 25-14, 25-15)
Mexico	3-0	Nicaragua	(25-16, 25-17, 25-17)

==== Group B ====
Rk	Team	Points	W	L	SW	SL	Ratio	PW	PL	Ratio
1	Dominican Republic	6	3	0	9	2	4.500	253	182	1.390
2	Venezuela	5	2	1	8	3	2.667	268	219	1.224
3	Costa Rica	4	1	2	3	6	0.500	173	201	0.861
4	Barbados	3	0	3	0	9	0.000	149	241	0.618

- November 29

Dominican Republic	3-0	Barbados	(25-7, 25-13, 25-15)
Costa Rica	0-3	Venezuela	(20-25, 20-25, 13-25)

- December 1

Barbados	0-3	Costa Rica	(17-25, 19-25, 15-25)
Dominican Republic	3-2	Venezuela	(25-17, 17-25, 25-20, 19-25, 17-15)

- December 3

Venezuela	3-0	Barbados	(25-13, 41-39, 25-11)
Costa Rica	0-3	Dominican Republic	(14-25, 13-25, 18-25)

=== Quarterfinals ===
- December 4

Mexico	3-0	Costa Rica	(25-14, 25-16, 25-21)
Nicaragua	0-3	Venezuela	(15-25, 14-25, 15-25)

=== Classification match (7th/8th place) ===
- December 5

El Salvador	3-1	Barbados	(16-25, 26-24, 25-23, 25-22)

=== Final round ===
Semi-finals
2002-12-05 – San Salvador
Puerto Rico	1
Venezuela	3
2002-12-05 – San Salvador
Dominican Republic	3
Mexico	0

Final
2002-12-06 – San Salvador
Venezuela	0
Dominican Republic	3
3rd place
2002-12-07 – San Salvador
Puerto Rico	2
Mexico	3

==== Semifinals ====
- December 5

Puerto Rico	1-3	Venezuela	(23-25, 25-20, 29-31, 23-25)
Dominican Republic	3-0	Mexico	(25-16, 25-22, 25-18)

=== Classification match (5th/6th place) ===
- December 6

Costa Rica	3-0	Nicaragua	(25-21, 25-15, 25-8)

==== Finals ====
===== Bronze-medal match =====
- December 6

Puerto Rico	2-3	Mexico	(19-25, 29-27, 22-25, 27-25, 13-15)

===== Gold-medal match =====
- December 7

Venezuela	0-3	Dominican Republic	(19-25, 18-25, 19-25)

=== Final standings ===
1. Dominican Republic
2. Venezuela
3. Mexico
4. Puerto Rico
5. Costa Rica
6. Nicaragua
7. El Salvador
8. Barbados

2002 Central American and Caribbean Games winners

Dominican Republic
Third title

=== Awards ===
- Most Valuable Player:
  - Milagros Cabral (DOM)
