= 2007 Women's NORCECA Volleyball Championship =

The 2007 Women's NORCECA Volleyball Championship was the 20th edition of the Women's Continental Volleyball Tournament, played by eight countries from September 17 to September 22, 2007, in Winnipeg, Manitoba, Canada. Cuba defeated the United States to conquer the gold medal and the Dominican Republic won the bronze medal over the hosts Canada. Cuban athlete Nancy Carrillo won the Most Valuable Player award.

== Competing nations ==
Group A	Group B
Canada; Costa Rica; Cuba; Puerto Rico	Dominican Republic; Mexico; Trinidad and Tobago; United States

== Preliminary round ==
=== Group A ===
- Monday September 17

Canada	3 – 0	Costa Rica	25-18 25-16 25–18
Cuba	3 – 1	Puerto Rico	25-22 24-26 25-21 25–12

- Tuesday September 18

Cuba	3 – 0	Costa Rica	25-14 25-8 25–15
Canada	3 – 2	Puerto Rico	25-20 25-20 24-26 15-25 15–04

- Wednesday September 19

Puerto Rico	3 – 0	Costa Rica	25-16 25-13 25–19
Canada	0 – 3	Cuba	20-25 18-25 10–25

=== Group B ===
- Monday September 17

United States	3 – 0	Trinidad & T.	25-09 25-07 25–06
Dominican R.	3 – 0	Mexico	25-17 25-19 25–13

- Tuesday September 18

Trinidad & T.	0 – 3	Dominican R.	13-25 12-25 13–25
Mexico	0 – 3	United States	06-25 25-13 25–10

- Wednesday September 19

Mexico	3 – 0	Trinidad & T.	25-22 25-16 25–15
United States	3 – 0	Dominican R.	25-20 25-18 25–22

== Final round ==
Semi-finals
2007-09-21 – Winnipeg, Manitoba
Cuba	3
Dominican Republic	0
2007-09-21 – Winnipeg, Manitoba
Canada	0
United States	3

Final
2007-09-22 – Winnipeg, Manitoba
Cuba	3
United States	2
3rd place
2007-09-22 – Winnipeg, Manitoba
Dominican Republic	3
Canada	2

=== Quarter-finals ===
- Thursday September 20

Dominican R.	3 – 0	Puerto Rico	25-22 25-22 25–15
Canada	3 – 0	Mexico	25-17 25-10 25–16

=== Semi-finals ===
- Friday September 21 — 5th/8th place

Mexico	3 – 1	Costa Rica	18-25 25-15 25-17 25–21
Puerto Rico	3 – 0	Trinidad & T.	25-11 25-10 25–15

- Friday September 21 — 1st/4th place

Cuba	3 – 0	Dominican R.	25-15 25-19 25–23
Canada	0 – 3	United States	18-25 11-25 23–25

=== Finals ===
- Saturday September 22 — Seventh Place Match

Costa Rica	3 – 0	Trinidad & T.	25-19 25-20 25–19

- Saturday September 22 — Fifth Place Match

Puerto Rico	3 – 0	Mexico	25-16 26-24 25–10

- Saturday September 22 — Bronze Medal Match

Dominican R.	3 – 2	Canada	25-17 22-25 25-23 20-25 15–13

- Saturday September 22 — Gold Medal Match

Cuba	3 – 2	United States	22-25 25-18 19-25 25-23 18–16

== Final ranking ==
Place	Team
1st place, gold medalist(s)	Cuba
2nd place, silver medalist(s)	United States
3rd place, bronze medalist(s)	Dominican Republic
4.	Canada
5.	Puerto Rico
6.	Mexico
7.	Costa Rica
8.	Trinidad and Tobago

2007 Women's NORCECA winners

Cuba
13th title

- Cuba and the United States qualified for the 2007 FIVB Women's World Cup

== Awards ==
- Most valuable player
  - (Cuba) Nancy Carrillo
- Best scorer
  - (Dominican Republic) Bethania de la Cruz
- Best spiker
  - (Cuba) Nancy Carrillo
- Best blocker
  - (Cuba) Nancy Carrillo
- Best server
  - (Puerto Rico) Áurea Cruz
- Best digger
  - (Puerto Rico) Deborah Seilhamer
- Best setter
  - (Puerto Rico) Vilmarie Mojica
- Best Passer
  - (Canada) Stacey Gordon
- Best libero
  - (Dominican Republic) Carmen Rosa Caso
