= La Romana Men (volleyball club) =

La Romana
- Full name: La Romana Men
- Founded: 2007
- Ground: Polideportivo Eleoncio Mercedes; La Romana, La Romana
- Chairman: (Dominican Republic) Amos Anglada
- Head Coach: (Dominican Republic) Loren Ricardo
- League: Dominican Volleyball League
- 2010: 3rd place

La Romana is the professional male volleyball team representing La Romana Province.

== History ==
The team was founded in 2007.

== Current squad ==
As of December 2008

Number	Player	Position
1	(Dominican Republic) Geudy Vargas	
2	(Dominican Republic) Francisco Liriano	
3	(Dominican Republic) Miguel De La Cruz	
4	(Dominican Republic) Juan Carlos Smith	
5	(Dominican Republic) Juan Mercedes	
6	(Dominican Republic) Reynaldo Núñez	
7	(Dominican Republic) Uriel Rijo	
8	(Dominican Republic) Rafael Solano	
9	(Dominican Republic) Eduardo Concepción	
10	(Dominican Republic) Jose Cabrera	
11	(Dominican Republic) Freddy Lizardo	
12	(Dominican Republic) Juan Carlos Lizardo	
13	(Dominican Republic) Loren Ricardo	
14	(Dominican Republic) Jhonatan Del Rosario	
15	(Dominican Republic) Eddy Guerrero	
16	(Dominican Republic) Richard Benjamin	
17	(Dominican Republic) Tomas Coats	
18	(Dominican Republic) Leony Vrennet Perez	

- Coach: (Dominican Republic) Loren Ricardo
- Assistant coach: (Dominican Republic) Rene Beli
