= Dominican Republic Volleyball League =

- Sport: Volleyball
- Founded: 2007
- No. of teams: Men: 8 Women: 8
- Country: Dominican Republic
- Most recent champions: Men: Distrito Nacional (3); Women: La Romana (1)
- Website: www.fedovoli.org

The Dominican Republic Volleyball League (Spanish: Liga Dominicana de Voleibol LIDOVOLI) is a professional volleyball league in Dominican Republic. The competitions are organized by the Dominican Republic Volleyball Confederation (Confederación Dominicana de Voleibol).

== Men's League Champions ==
Year	Gold	Silver	Bronze
2007	Distrito Nacional	Bahoruco	Espaillat
2008	Distrito Nacional	Bahoruco	Sánchez Ramírez
2010	Distrito Nacional	Bahoruco	La Romana

== Women's League Champions ==
Year	Gold	Silver	Bronze
2007	Distrito Nacional	La Romana	Santiago
2008	Distrito Nacional	San Cristóbal	Santiago
2010	La Romana	Distrito Nacional	Bonao
