= 2006 Women's Pan-American Volleyball Cup squads =

This article shows all participating team squads at the 2006 Women's Pan-American Volleyball Cup, held from June 27 to July 8, 2006 in San Juan, Puerto Rico.

== Argentina ==
- Head coach: Carlos Di Leonardo

#	Name	Date of birth	Height	Weight	Spike	Block
1	Yamila Nizetich	27.01.1989
2	Clarisa Sagardia	29.06.1989
3	Viviana Dominkó (c)	03.10.1982
4	Leticia Boscacci	08.11.1985
5	Mirna Ansaldi	10.07.1977
6	Melisa Callo	05.03.1988
7	Aylin Pereyra	02.07.1988
9	Marcela Re	06.07.1980
12	Antonella Bortolozzi	22.01.1986
14	Julieta Borghi	06.05.1982
15	Julieta Lazcano	25.07.1989
17	Natalia Espinosa	13.04.1984

== Canada ==
- Head coach: Naoki Miyashita

#	Name	Date of birth	Height	Weight	Spike	Block
1	Stacey Gordon
2	Tara Smart
3	Larissa Cundy
4	Tammy Mahon
5	Tiffany Dodds
6	Anne-Marie Lemieux
9	Emily Cordonier
11	Lies Reimer
14	Shelley Chalmers
15	Melissa Raymond (c)
16	Annie Levesque
18	Gina Schmidt

== Cuba ==
- Head coach: Eugenio George

#	Name	Date of birth	Height	Weight	Spike	Block
1	Yumilka Ruiz (c)	08.05.1978	179	62	329	315
3	Nancy Carrillo	11.01.1986	190	74	318	315
6	Daimí Ramírez	08.10.1983	176	67	305	290
7	Lisbet Arredondo	22.11.1987	181	62	315	312
8	Yaima Ortiz	09.11.1981	179	70	325	313
9	Rachel Sánchez	09.01.1989	188	75	325	320
11	Yisel Cabrera	02.10.1984	180	66	308	304
12	Rosir Calderón	28.12.1984	191	66	330	325
13	Anniara Muñoz	24.01.1980	180	69	320	312
14	Kenia Carcaces	22.01.1986	188	69	308	306
16	María Téllez	12.09.1983	186	69	320	316
18	Zoila Barros	06.08.1976	188	76	325	312

== Dominican Republic ==
- Head coach: Beato Miguel Cruz

#	Name	Date of birth	Height	Weight	Spike	Block
1	Annerys Vargas	07.08.1982	191	70	303	298
5	Evelyn Carrera	05.10.1971	182	70	301	297
6	Carmen Rosa Caso	29.11.1981	168	59	243	241
9	Nuris Arias	20.05.1973	190	78	315	306
10	Milagros Cabral	17.10.1978	181	63	308	305
11	Juana Miguelina González	03.01.1979	185	70	295	290
12	Karla Echenique	16.05.1986	181	62	279	273
13	Cindy Rondón	12.11.1988	189	61	312	305
14	Prisilla Rivera	29.12.1986	183	67	309	305
15	Cosiri Rodríguez (c)	30.08.1977	191	72	313	305
18	Bethania de la Cruz	13.05.1989	188	58	322	305

== Mexico ==
- Head coach: Marco Heredia

#	Name	Date of birth	Height	Weight	Spike	Block
1	Yendy Cortinas	04.07.1982	185	71	296	294
2	Migdalel Ruiz	03.03.1983	180	75	307	298
3	Célida Córdova	01.08.1980	174	68	282	272
6	Mariana García
7	Bibiana Candelas (c)	02.12.1983	196	78	310	302
8	Ana Mercado	19.02.1983	185	82
11	Blanca Chan	26.07.1981	182	75	298	286
12	Claudia Rodríguez	10.08.1981	191	95	315	305
13	Mariana López	30.08.1985	178	69	295	286
14	Alejandra Acosta	01.07.1986	177	75	290	284
17	Zaira Orellana	03.05.1989	183	63	295	287
18	Gloria Segura	11.02.1982	189	79

== Peru ==
- Head coach: Carlos Aparicio

#	Name	Date of birth	Height	Weight	Spike	Block
3	Natalia Romanova	11.12.1972	185	69
5	Leyla Chihuán	04.09.1975	180	67	297	306
6	Luren Baylón	14.08.1977	180	68	310	305
7	Jessenia Uceda	14.08.1981	175	69	304	294
8	Elena Keldibekova	23.06.1974	177	72	289	280
9	Milagros Moy	17.10.1975	176	72	296	282
10	Sara Joya	22.02.1976	182	70	298	295
11	Patricia Soto	10.02.1980	179	67	300	295
12	Mirtha Uribe	12.03.1985	182	67	297	286
14	Yulissa Zamudio	24.03.1976	184	61	320	300
16	Carla Tristán	29.01.1988	180	67	297	295
18	Vanessa Palacios	03.07.1984	167	66	255	250

== Puerto Rico ==
- Head coach: Juan Carlos Núñez

#	Name	Date of birth	Height	Weight	Spike	Block
3	Vilmarie Mojica (c)	13.08.1985	177	63	295	274
4	Tatiana Encarnación	28.07.1985	182	72	300	279
5	Sarai Álvarez	03.04.1986	189	61	295	286
6	Yarleen Santiago	18.01.1978	182	72	305	287
8	Eva Cruz	22.01.1974	182	72	305	290
9	Áurea Cruz	10.01.1982	182	63	310	290
11	Karina Ocasio	08.01.1985	192	76	298	288
14	Glorimar Ortega	21.11.1983	179	70	297	285
15	Shanon Torregrosa	11.02.1981	182	68	307	287
17	Sheila Ocasio	17.11.1982	192	74	310	292
18	Jetzabel Del Valle	19.12.1979	185	73	305	292

== United States ==
- Head coach: Lang Ping

#	Name	Date of birth	Height	Weight	Spike	Block
3	Tayyiba Haneef
5	Sarah Drury
6	Elisabeth Bachman
7	Heather Bown
8	Katie Wilkins
9	Jennifer Joines
10	Jane Collymore
11	Robyn Ah Mow-Santos
12	Nancy Metcalf
14	Candace Lee
16	Sam Tortorello
18	Cassie Busse
