= Mirador Volleyball squads =

This article shows past squads from the Dominican professional volleyball team Mirador Volleyball.

== 2004 ==
- Dominican Republic Distrito Nacional Superior Tournament Squad
- Head Coach: (Dominican Republic) Héctor Romero
- Assistant Coach: (Dominican Republic) Wilson Sánchez
- Champions

Number	Player	Position
3	(Dominican Republic) Yudelkys Bautista	Middle Blocker
4	(Dominican Republic) Yahaira Bautista	Middle Blocker
6	(Dominican Republic) Alexandra Caso	Libero
8	(Dominican Republic) Altagracia Muñoz	Wing Spiker
10	(Dominican Republic) Bethania de la Cruz	Wing Spiker
11	(Dominican Republic) Rosalín Ángeles	Opposite
12	(Dominican Republic) Francia Jackson	Setter
13	(Dominican Republic) Laritza Reyes	Opposite
14	(Dominican Republic) Prisilla Rivera	Opposite
15	(Dominican Republic) Cosiri Rodríguez	Opposite
16	(Dominican Republic) Kenia Moreta	Wing Spiker

== 2005 ==
- Dominican Republic Metropolitan League Squad
- Head Coach: (Dominican Republic) Héctor Romero
- Assistant Coach: (Dominican Republic) Wilson Sánchez
- The team reached semifinals

Number	Player	Position
1	(Dominican Republic) Bethania de la Cruz	Wing Spiker
2	(Dominican Republic) Solangel Aquino	Wing Spiker
3	(Dominican Republic) Dileicy Mercedes	Wing Spiker
4	(Dominican Republic) Elaine Santos	Setter
6	(Dominican Republic) Alexandra Caso	Libero
8	(Dominican Republic) Juana Saviñón	Wing Spiker
11	(Dominican Republic) Cinthia Piñeiro	Middle Blocker
13	(Dominican Republic) Keila Antigua	Opposite
15	(Dominican Republic) Ruth Reyes	Setter
16	(Dominican Republic) Cindy Solibey	Wing Spiker
17	(Dominican Republic) Arianna Pérez	Wing Spiker

== 2006 ==
- Dominican Republic Metropolitan League Squad
- Head Coach: (Dominican Republic) Wilson Sánchez
- League Championship

Number	Player	Position
1	(Dominican Republic) Bethania de la Cruz	Wing Spiker
2	(Dominican Republic) Ana Ligia Fabian	Wing Spiker
3	(Dominican Republic) Yahaira Bautista	Middle Blocker
4	(Dominican Republic) Marianne Fersola	Middle Blocker
5	(Dominican Republic) Marifranchi Rodríguez	Middle Blocker
6	(Dominican Republic) Yeimi Arias	Libero
7	(Dominican Republic) Niverka Marte	Wing Spiker
9	(Dominican Republic) Nuris Arias	Wing Spiker
10	(Dominican Republic) Jeoselyna Rodríguez	Wing Spiker
12	(Dominican Republic) Karla Echenique	Setter
13	(Dominican Republic) Laritza Reyes	Opposite
15	(Dominican Republic) Consuelo Guzmán	Setter
18	(Dominican Republic) Ginnette Del Rosario	Middle Blocker

== 2008 CDN Mirador ==
- 2008 Salonpas Cup
- CDN Mirador (Club Deportivo Nacional Mirador
- Head Coach: Marcos Kwiek

#	Name	Date of birth	Height	Weight	Spike	Block
1	Annerys Vargas	07.08.1981	194	70	325	315
2	Ana Yorkira Binet	09.02.1992	174	62	267	288
3	Lisvel Elisa Eve	10.09.1991	189	70	250	287
4	Sidarka Núñez	25.06.1984	188	58	312	308
5	Brenda Castillo	05.06.1992	167	55	220	270
6	Carmen Rosa Caso	29.11.1981	168	59	243	241
7	Niverka Marte	19.10.1990	178	71	233	283
8	Gina Del Rosario	12.05.1986	189	61	310	300
9	Marianne Fersola	16.01.1992	180	60	240	287
10	Milagros Cabral	17.10.1978	181	63	308	305
11	Jeoselyna Rodriguez	09.12.1991	184	63	242	288
12	Karla Echenique	16.05.1986	181	62	279	273
13	Cindy Rondon	12.11.1988	189	61	312	305
14	Prisilla Rivera	29.12.1984	186	70	312	308
15	Cosiri Rodriguez (c)	30.08.1977	191	72	313	305
16	Marifranchi Rodriguez	29.08.1990	184	68	310	300
17	Altagracia Mambru	21.01.1986	180	55	312	302
18	Bethania de la Cruz	13.05.1989	188	58	322	305

=== 2010 ===
NORCECA representative at the 2010 FIVB Women's Club World Championship squad. The team ranked 4th. As of December 2010

- Head Coach: (Brazil) Marcos Kwiek
- Assistant coach: (Brazil) Wagner Pacheco

Number	Player	Position
1	(Dominican Republic) Annerys Vargas	Middle Blocker
2	(Dominican Republic) Brayelin Martínez	Wing Spiker
3	(Dominican Republic) Gabriela Reyes	Setter
4	(Dominican Republic) Yeniffer Ramírez	Wing Spiker
5	(Dominican Republic) Brenda Castillo	Libero
6	(Dominican Republic) Carmen Rosa Caso	Libero
7	(Dominican Republic) Niverka Marte	Setter
8	(Dominican Republic) Cándida Arias	Middle Blocker
9	(Dominican Republic) Sidarka Núñez	Opposite
10	(Dominican Republic) Milagros Cabral	Wing Spiker
11	(Dominican Republic) Yonkaira Peña	Wing Spiker
12	(Dominican Republic) Karla Echenique	Setter
13	(Dominican Republic) Cindy Rondón	Opposite
15	(Dominican Republic) Marifranchi Rodríguez	Middle Blocker
16	(Dominican Republic) Marisol Concepción	Wing Spiker
18	(Dominican Republic) Bethania de la Cruz	Wing Spiker
19	(Dominican Republic) Ana Yorkira Binet	Wing Spiker

=== 2011 ===
NORCECA representative at the 2011 FIVB Women's Club World Championship squad.

- Head Coach: (Dominican Republic) Wilson Sánchez
- Assistant coach: (Dominican Republic) Cristian Cruz

Number	Player	Position
1	(Dominican Republic) Marianne Fersola	Middle Blocker
2	(Dominican Republic) Erasma Moreno	Wing Spiker
5	(Dominican Republic) Deborah Constanzo	Opposite
6	(Dominican Republic) Carmen Rosa Caso	Libero
8	(Dominican Republic) Pamela Soriano	Middle Blocker
9	(Dominican Republic) Celenia Toribio	Middle Blocker
10	(Dominican Republic) Yeniffer Ramírez	Wing Spiker
11	(Dominican Republic) Jeoselyna Rodríguez	Opposite
12	(Dominican Republic) Francia Jackson	Setter
13	(Dominican Republic) Yonkaira Peña	Wing Spiker
14	(Dominican Republic) Erika Mota	Wing Spiker
15	(Dominican Republic) Brayelin Martínez	Wing Spiker
