= Yaima Ortiz =

Cuban volleyball player and model

Personal information
- Full name: Yaima Ortiz Charro
- Born: 9 November 1981 (age 44) Havana, Cuba
- Home town: Istanbul, Turkey
- Height: 179 cm (5 ft 10 in)
- Weight: 67 kg (148 lb)
- Spike: 326 cm (128 in)
- Block: 313 cm (123 in)

Volleyball information
- Position: Universal / Libero
- Number: 8

National team
- Years: Team
- 2001–2008: Cuba
Honours
Women's volleyball
Representing Cuba
Olympic Games
Bronze medal – third place	2004 Athens	Team
FIVB World Grand Prix
Silver medal – second place	Yokohama 2008	Team
Pan American Games
Gold medal – first place	2007 Rio de Janeiro	Team
Silver medal – second place	2003 Santo Domingo	Team
Pan-American Cup
Gold medal – first place	2002 Tijuana	Team
Gold medal – first place	2004 Mexicali	Team
Gold medal – first place	2005 Santo Domingo	Team
Silver medal – second place	2006 San Juan	Team
Bronze medal – third place	2003 Saltillo	Team
Central American and Caribbean Games
Silver medal – second place	2006 Cartagena	Team
NORCECA Championship
Gold medal – first place	2007 Winnipeg	Team
Silver medal – second place	2001 Santo Domingo	Team
Silver medal – second place	2003 Santo Domingo	Team
Silver medal – second place	2005 Port of Spain	Team
- Updated on December 2017

Yaima Ortiz Charro (born 9 November 1981, in Havana) is a retired Cuban volleyball player and model who competed in the 2004 and 2008 Summer Olympics. She won a bronze medal with the Cuban national team in the 2004 Olympics.

== Career ==
=== 2001 ===
Ortiz made altitude training in March 2001 with the National Team in Riobamba, Ecuador in order to be in shape for the upcoming tournaments. She played the 2001 FIVB World Grand Prix, finishing in fourth place, and later played the 2001 NORCECA Championship in Santo Domingo, winning the silver medal.

=== 2002 ===
Ortiz was called to the Cerro Pelado Training Center as one of the national team rookies at the age of 21. She later played the 2002 Cuban National League with the club Occidentales that became league champion with Ortiz's help, and only lost one match in the whole season. After the Cuban league, she joined the national team under the guidance of coaches Eugenio George, Luis Felipe Calderón and Jorge Garbey, set to a four-country warmup tour before the Pan American Cup. After beating the Dominican Republic 3–1, she won the 2002 Pan-American Cup gold medal. Shortly after that, she departed to the 2002 FIVB World Grand Prix in a competition where her national team ranked in seventh place. She was among the Cuban team called for the 2002 FIVB World Championship, in which she mostly played as substitute player. However, her team lost 0–3 to the United States in the quarterfinals and had to settle for playing the fifth to eight places round. After defeating Bulgaria 3–2, they won 3–2 over Korea to reach the tournament's fifth place.

=== 2003 ===
Ortiz was part of the Cuban team that won the 2003 Pan-American Cup bronze medal. She then was called to play the 2003 Pan American Games where her team won the silver medal when they lost 2–3 to the Dominican Republic in the gold medal match. Ortiz played the 2003 FIVB World Cup where her team qualified by winning the 2003 NORCECA Continental Championship silver medal.

=== 2004 ===
Ortiz was among the core of the national team that was getting ready for the 2004 Summer Olympics. She led all the spikers during the 2004 Pan-American Cup held in Mexico, with a 56.00 percent success, winning the gold medal and the Best Spiker award. She was a member of the Cuban team which won the bronze medal in the Olympic tournament. She played under the guidance of the veteran coach Nikolay Karpol with the Russian club Dinamo Moscow Oblast for the 2004/05 season with fellow Cuban Marta Sánchez, where she said she felt like home and became very interested in the country.

=== 2005 ===
Ortiz helped Cuba to win the 2005 Pan-American Cup championship in Santo Domingo, Dominican Republic. She was chosen to play the 2005 FIVB Volleyball World Grand Prix and she ranked fourth in the final standings.

Later in August, she played in Santiago, Dominican Republic and she helped Cuba to win their qualification tournament for the 2006 FIVB World Championship.

Ortiz helped the Cuban team over the Dominican Republic in the 2005 NORCECA Championship semifinals before they settled for the silver medal when falling to the United States 2–3, failing the championship and the ticket to the FIVB Grand Champions Cup. She played for Uralochka-NTMK for 2005/06.

=== 2006 ===
Ortiz was one of the key players of the Occidentales victory in the 2006 Cuban National Games, when they defeated the Dominican Republic representatives 3–1. She then headed to San Juan, Puerto Rico to participate in the 2006 Pan-American Cup, where they won the silver medal after falling 1–3 to Brazil, and the 2006 Central American and Caribbean Games. She then played the 2006 FIVB World Grand Prix, but she could not play as an attacker because she was injured. In the 2006 World Championship she played as Rosir Calderon's substitute for serve and defense because she was still recovering from knee surgery. She also played as a libero.

=== 2007 ===
She won the 2007 Pan American Games gold medal with her national team, playing as the team libero. She was still in the libero position for the 2007 NORCECA Championship, because she was still having a recovering knee and her team won the tournament by defeating 3–2 to the United States in the golden medal match. She played as libero for the 2007 FIVB World Cup. In 2007, she played the 2007 FIVB World Cup, ranking with her national team in fourth place. She later played also as libero in the NORCECA Olympic Qualification Tournament, where her team won a berth for the 2008 Summer Olympics by winning the event undefeated.

=== 2008 ===
She was included in the 2008 Pan-American Cup squad that ranked 11th from 12 participants and later won the silver medal in the 2008 FIVB World Grand Prix. She finished fourth with the Cuban team in the 2008 Olympic tournament.

Ortiz decided to take a break from the Cuban national team after the Olympics, but when she tried to return to the team she received a two years penalty from the Cuban authorities. After the Olympic disappointment, she dedicated herself to modeling in Italy.

=== 2010 ===
Even when she received offers from Italian volleyball clubs, her agent Alexei Kunyshev recommended the Russian league to her. After the two-year break from volleyball, Ortiz travelled in June 2010 to Russia to the Siberian city of Omsk, training during the Omichka Omsk club's vacation time in order to get in shape before August, when the contracts were going to be held. She was introduced to the press as an Omichka club member for the 2010/10 season in an open training session on 19 August 2010. She played the second round of the 2010/11 GM Capital Challenge Cup, with Omichka winning in December the home match to the Azerbaijani club Lokomotiv Baku, 3–2. However, they lost the away match 0-3 and the golden set, ending their European Cups participation. She led her club with 18 points in the lost 0–3 to Dinamo Moscow, with her first match in Siberian severe weather at under 30 degrees below zero. Because of the weather the club's doctor asked her not to play, and Ortiz was sidelined for the last 2010 match against Dinamo Krasnodar due to acute respiratory distress syndrome, but she opted to stay with the team in the warm up zone and cheer during the match.

=== 2011 ===
After Ortiz played nine matches with the Omsk club, averaging 4.31 points per set and ranking seventh in the Russian Superliga, she moved in February to the Azerbaijani club Igtisadchi Baku. She ended the season by winning the Azerbaijan Super League bronze medal.

She signed with the Russian club Dinamo Moscow for the 2011/12 season. She expressed that she was honored to play with this club and had many goals, including winning the CEV Champions League. However, due to low performance, the club's administration decided to hire Angelina Grün in her place to stay on court along with Eva Yaneva because of the local league restrictions. Ortiz agreed to continue playing in the 2011–12 CEV Champions League, and also helped them to win the 2011 Russian Cup.

=== 2012 ===
Ortiz played the CEV Champions League and contributed with her club to win their pool first place in the preliminary round. They reached the CEV Champions League Knockout stage, where they lost 2–3 to the Italian club MC-Carnaghi Villa Cortese in Italy, and 0–3 in Moscow, to end her club's European Championship and her time with the Moscow club. The club tried to help Ortiz to find a new club for the rest of the season.

She later signed for the Turkish club Sarıyer Belediyesi for the 2012/13 season. The contract was questioned within the Sarıyer Municipal Assembly, when a local lawmaker asked for clarification about the Ortiz contract worth US$1.5 million and the Brazilian Olympic player Raquel Silva US$1.25 million at the time. He showed in the assembly and published in the municipality website pictures of Ortiz in a bikini. He asked if they had come to Turkey for modelling, and questioned where the funding came from. The club president said that she had signed for US$100,000 just to play volleyball, and that the funding would be contributed by the club sponsors on a monthly basis for 10 months, starting in September 2012.

Ortiz won the first International Bosphorus Volleyball Tournament organized for her club as a warm up before the season's start. She started the season as her club's scoring leader, but decreased her performance because she was injured.

=== 2013-2015 ===
She claimed that she really enjoyed playing with Sarıyer, focused on reaching a league's top six ranking to qualify for the European Cups. She said that she looked forward playing with them the next season. However, she announced her retirement after that season, due to suffering a knee injury. She cited family reasons for making a pause in her career in July 2013, but nonetheless, she supported her former teammates in the Sarıyer's opening ceremony of the 2013–2014 season.

She unsuccessfully tried a return in October, with Sarıyer releasing the Ukrainian Mariia Voitenko, club's previous signing, to make room for her. Instead, she dedicated herself to modeling again.

She tried to return for the 2014/15 season with Sarıyer, signing after having spent one year out, and the medical check was approved, but the Brazilian Ana Paula Lopes Ferreira was transferred in her place when she suffered from injuries to her knee cartilage.

2022

In 2022 she lounge her own brand . Yo by Yaima Ortiz .

== Personal life ==
Ortiz was born on 9 November 1981 in Havana, Cuba. As of 2007 she was studying physical education in Cuba. She started playing volleyball at the age of eight, and studied in the EIDE Mártires de Barbados school before joining the Centro de Alto Rendimiento Cerro Pelado for advance training.

In 2008 she was discovered in Providencia, Chile by the Chilean designer Rubén Campos, while she was visiting her mother. She lost 10 kg, took modelling classes and announced her sport retirement at that time, claiming that she just wanted to model. She spent one and a half years modelling in Italy, and married Massimiliano Gambini.

After her second retirement, she established herself in Istanbul and worked as a model.

The American Hyperrealism sculptor and artist Carole Feuerman made a sculpture of Ortiz named Yaima and the Ball that debuted in December 2014.

During her career Ortiz suffered from a strong tendinitis of the right shoulder and degenerative meniscopathy of the right knee. Dr. Mario Pastorelli helped her recover her career.

In December 2016 she married the Turkish yacht designer Rizá Tansu in Cuba, where the Cuban band Orishas recorded their music video "Sastre de tu amor".

== Clubs ==
- (Cuba) Occidentales (2002)
- (Cuba) Ciudad Habana (2003–2004)
- (Russia) Dinamo Moscow Oblast (2004–2005)
- (Russia) Uralochka-NTMK (2005–2006)
- (Cuba) Ciudad Habana (2006–2008)
- (Russia) Omička Omsk (2010–2011)
- (Azerbaijan) Igtisadchi Baku (2011)
- (Russia) Dinamo Moscow (2011–2012)
- (Turkey) Sarıyer Belediyesi (2012–2013)

== Awards ==
=== Individuals ===
- 2004 Pan-American Cup "Best Spiker"

=== Clubs ===
- 2002 Cuban National League - Champion, with Occidentales
- 2010-11 Azerbaijan Super League - Bronze medal, with Igtisadchi Baku
- 2011-12 Russian Cup - Champion, with Dinamo Moscow
- 2011-12 Russian League - Runner-up, with Dinamo Moscow
