= 2007 FIVB Volleyball Women's World Cup squads =

This article shows the rosters of all participating teams at the 2007 FIVB Volleyball Women's World Cup in Japan.

== Brazil ==
The following is the Brazil roster in the 2007 FIVB World Cup.

| # | Name | Date of birth | Height | Weight | Spike | Block | Club |
|---|---|---|---|---|---|---|---|
| 1 | Walewska Oliveira | 1 October 1979 | 190 cm (6 ft 3 in) | 73 kg (161 lb) | 310 cm (10 ft 2 in) | 290 cm (9 ft 6 in) | C. A. V. Murcia |
| 4 | Paula Pequeno | 22 January 1982 | 184 cm (6 ft 0 in) | 74 kg (163 lb) | 302 cm (9 ft 11 in) | 290 cm (9 ft 6 in) | Fenerbahce |
| 5 | Caroline Gattaz | 27 July 1981 | 191 cm (6 ft 3 in) | 87 kg (192 lb) | 304 cm (10 ft 0 in) | 280 cm (9 ft 2 in) | Unilever |
| 6 | Thaisa Menezes | 15 May 1987 | 196 cm (6 ft 5 in) | 79 kg (174 lb) | 316 cm (10 ft 4 in) | 301 cm (9 ft 11 in) | Eczacibasi |
| 7 | Hélia Souza | 10 March 1970 | 173 cm (5 ft 8 in) | 65 kg (143 lb) | 283 cm (9 ft 3 in) | 264 cm (8 ft 8 in) | Unilever Volei |
| 8 | Fabiola de Souza | 3 February 1983 | 184 cm (6 ft 0 in) | 70 kg (150 lb) | 300 cm (9 ft 10 in) | 285 cm (9 ft 4 in) | Volero Zurich |
| 9 | Fabiana Claudino | 24 January 1985 | 193 cm (6 ft 4 in) | 76 kg (168 lb) | 314 cm (10 ft 4 in) | 293 cm (9 ft 7 in) | Sesi - Sp |
| 10 | Welissa Gonzaga | 9 September 1982 | 179 cm (5 ft 10 in) | 76 kg (168 lb) | 300 cm (9 ft 10 in) | 287 cm (9 ft 5 in) | Dentil Praia Clube |
| 12 | Jaqueline Carvalho | 31 December 1983 | 186 cm (6 ft 1 in) | 70 kg (150 lb) | 302 cm (9 ft 11 in) | 284 cm (9 ft 4 in) | Minas Tênis Clube |
| 13 | Sheilla Castro | 1 July 1983 | 185 cm (6 ft 1 in) | 64 kg (141 lb) | 302 cm (9 ft 11 in) | 284 cm (9 ft 4 in) | Vakifbank |
| 14 | Fabiana Oliveira | 7 March 1980 | 169 cm (5 ft 7 in) | 59 kg (130 lb) | 276 cm (9 ft 1 in) | 266 cm (8 ft 9 in) | Rexona-Sesc |
| 16 | Natália Pereira | 4 April 1989 | 183 cm (6 ft 0 in) | 76 kg (168 lb) | 300 cm (9 ft 10 in) | 288 cm (9 ft 5 in) | Rexona-Ades |

== Cuba ==
The following is the Cuba roster in the 2007 FIVB World Cup.

| # | Name | Date of birth | Height | Weight | Spike | Block | Club |
|---|---|---|---|---|---|---|---|
| 1 | Yumilka Ruiz Luaces | 8 May 1978 | 180 cm (5 ft 11 in) | 63 kg (139 lb) | 326 cm (10 ft 8 in) | 305 cm (10 ft 0 in) | Camaguey |
| 2 | Yanelis Santos Allegne | 30 March 1986 | 181 cm (5 ft 11 in) | 69 kg (152 lb) | 324 cm (10 ft 8 in) | 304 cm (10 ft 0 in) | Ciego de Avila |
| 3 | Nancy Carrillo De La Paz | 11 January 1986 | 190 cm (6 ft 3 in) | 74 kg (163 lb) | 320 cm (10 ft 6 in) | 315 cm (10 ft 4 in) | Ciudad de la Habana |
| 4 | Yenisey Gonzalez Dias | 22 August 1983 | 193 cm (6 ft 4 in) | 70 kg (150 lb) | 320 cm (10 ft 6 in) | 305 cm (10 ft 0 in) | La Habana |
| 6 | Daymi De La Caridad Ramirez Echevarria | 8 October 1983 | 180 cm (5 ft 11 in) | 77 kg (170 lb) | 305 cm (10 ft 0 in) | 290 cm (9 ft 6 in) | Camaguey |
| 8 | Yaima Ortiz Charro | 9 November 1981 | 181 cm (5 ft 11 in) | 72 kg (159 lb) | 326 cm (10 ft 8 in) | 303 cm (9 ft 11 in) | Ciudad de la Habana |
| 9 | Rachel Sanchez Perez | 9 January 1989 | 188 cm (6 ft 2 in) | 86 kg (190 lb) | 316 cm (10 ft 4 in) | 297 cm (9 ft 9 in) | Pinar del Rio |
| 10 | Yusleyni Herrera Alvarez | 12 March 1984 | 178 cm (5 ft 10 in) | 63 kg (139 lb) | 325 cm (10 ft 8 in) | 305 cm (10 ft 0 in) | Ciudad de la Habana |
| 12 | Rosir Calderón Diaz | 28 December 1984 | 191 cm (6 ft 3 in) | 70 kg (150 lb) | 330 cm (10 ft 10 in) | 307 cm (10 ft 1 in) | Ciudad de la Habana |
| 14 | Kenia Carcaces Opón | 22 January 1986 | 190 cm (6 ft 3 in) | 78 kg (172 lb) | 306 cm (10 ft 0 in) | 289 cm (9 ft 6 in) | Volero Zürich |
| 15 | Yusidey Silie Frómeta | 11 November 1984 | 184 cm (6 ft 0 in) | 77 kg (170 lb) | 316 cm (10 ft 4 in) | 300 cm (9 ft 10 in) | Ciudad de la Habana |
| 18 | Zoila Barros Fernández | 16 August 1976 | 188 cm (6 ft 2 in) | 72 kg (159 lb) | 328 cm (10 ft 9 in) | 307 cm (10 ft 1 in) | Ciudad de la Habana |

== Dominican Republic ==
The following is the Dominican Republic roster in the 2007 FIVB World Cup.

| # | Name | Date of birth | Height | Weight | Spike | Block | Club |
|---|---|---|---|---|---|---|---|
| 3 | Lisvel Elisa Eve Mejia | 10 September 1991 | 194 cm (6 ft 4 in) | 70 kg (150 lb) | 325 cm (10 ft 8 in) | 315 cm (10 ft 4 in) | Mirador |
| 4 | Sidarka De Los Milagros Nuñez | 25 June 1984 | 185 cm (6 ft 1 in) | 62 kg (137 lb) | 330 cm (10 ft 10 in) | 320 cm (10 ft 6 in) | Club Malanga |
| 5 | Brenda Castillo | 5 June 1992 | 167 cm (5 ft 6 in) | 55 kg (121 lb) | 245 cm (8 ft 0 in) | 230 cm (7 ft 7 in) | San Cristobal |
| 6 | Carmen Rosa Caso Sierra | 29 November 1981 | 168 cm (5 ft 6 in) | 59 kg (130 lb) | 240 cm (7 ft 10 in) | 230 cm (7 ft 7 in) | Mirador |
| 7 | Ginnette Del Rosario Selmo | 12 May 1986 | 191 cm (6 ft 3 in) | 59 kg (130 lb) | 316 cm (10 ft 4 in) | 308 cm (10 ft 1 in) | Deportivo Nacional |
| 8 | Gina Del Rosario Selmo | 12 May 1986 | 189 cm (6 ft 2 in) | 61 kg (134 lb) | 310 cm (10 ft 2 in) | 300 cm (9 ft 10 in) | Deportivo Nacional |
| 9 | Nuris Arias Doñe | 20 May 1973 | 190 cm (6 ft 3 in) | 78 kg (172 lb) | 315 cm (10 ft 4 in) | 306 cm (10 ft 0 in) | Mirador |
| 10 | Milagros Cabral De La Cruz | 17 October 1978 | 182 cm (6 ft 0 in) | 63 kg (139 lb) | 325 cm (10 ft 8 in) | 320 cm (10 ft 6 in) | Los Cachorros |
| 12 | Karla Miguelina Echenique Medina | 16 May 1986 | 181 cm (5 ft 11 in) | 62 kg (137 lb) | 279 cm (9 ft 2 in) | 300 cm (9 ft 10 in) | Mirador |
| 13 | Cindy Carolina Rondon Martinez | 12 November 1987 | 186 cm (6 ft 1 in) | 61 kg (134 lb) | 320 cm (10 ft 6 in) | 315 cm (10 ft 4 in) | Seleccion Nacional |
| 15 | Cosiri Rodriguez Andino | 30 August 1977 | 191 cm (6 ft 3 in) | 72 kg (159 lb) | 313 cm (10 ft 3 in) | 305 cm (10 ft 0 in) | San Cristobal |
| 18 | Bethania De La Cruz De Peña | 13 May 1987 | 188 cm (6 ft 2 in) | 70 kg (150 lb) | 330 cm (10 ft 10 in) | 320 cm (10 ft 6 in) | Deportivo Nacional |

== Italy ==
The following is the Italy roster in the 2007 FIVB World Cup.

| # | Name | Date of birth | Height | Weight | Spike | Block | Club |
|---|---|---|---|---|---|---|---|
| 1 | Sara Anzanello | 30 July 1980 | 193 cm (6 ft 4 in) | 78 kg (172 lb) | 316 cm (10 ft 4 in) | 298 cm (9 ft 9 in) | Azerrail Baku |
| 7 | Martina Guiggi | 1 May 1984 | 187 cm (6 ft 2 in) | 80 kg (180 lb) | 315 cm (10 ft 4 in) | 290 cm (9 ft 6 in) | Guangdong Evergrande |
| 8 | Jenny Barazza | 24 July 1981 | 188 cm (6 ft 2 in) | 77 kg (170 lb) | 300 cm (9 ft 10 in) | 285 cm (9 ft 4 in) | Liu Jo Volley Modena |
| 9 | Manuela Secolo | 22 February 1977 | 180 cm (5 ft 11 in) | 70 kg (150 lb) | 302 cm (9 ft 11 in) | 279 cm (9 ft 2 in) | MG Carnaghi Villa Cortese |
| 10 | Paola Cardullo | 18 March 1982 | 159 cm (5 ft 3 in) | 56 kg (123 lb) | 275 cm (9 ft 0 in) | 268 cm (8 ft 10 in) | 0 |
| 11 | Serena Ortolani | 7 January 1987 | 187 cm (6 ft 2 in) | 63 kg (139 lb) | 308 cm (10 ft 1 in) | 288 cm (9 ft 5 in) | Pomì Casalmaggiore |
| 12 | Taismary Aguero | 5 March 1977 | 177 cm (5 ft 10 in) | 69 kg (152 lb) | 322 cm (10 ft 7 in) | 300 cm (9 ft 10 in) | MG Carnaghi Villa Cortese |
| 13 | Francesca Ferretti | 15 February 1984 | 180 cm (5 ft 11 in) | 70 kg (150 lb) | 296 cm (9 ft 9 in) | 280 cm (9 ft 2 in) | Rabita Baku |
| 14 | Eleonora Lo Bianco | 22 December 1979 | 171 cm (5 ft 7 in) | 67 kg (148 lb) | 287 cm (9 ft 5 in) | 273 cm (8 ft 11 in) | Galatasaray Istanbul |
| 15 | Antonella Del Core | 5 November 1980 | 180 cm (5 ft 11 in) | 70 kg (150 lb) | 296 cm (9 ft 9 in) | 279 cm (9 ft 2 in) | Fakel Novyj Urengoj |
| 17 | Simona Gioli | 17 September 1977 | 185 cm (6 ft 1 in) | 70 kg (150 lb) | 307 cm (10 ft 1 in) | 283 cm (9 ft 3 in) | Fakel Novyj Urengoj |

== Japan ==
The following is the Japan roster in the 2007 FIVB World Cup.

- Head coach: Shoichi Yanagimoto

| # | Name | Date of birth | Height | Weight | Spike | Block | Club |
|---|---|---|---|---|---|---|---|
| 1 | Megumi Kurihara | 31 July 1984 | 186 cm (6 ft 1 in) | 69 kg (152 lb) | 305 cm (10 ft 0 in) | 285 cm (9 ft 4 in) | Pioneer Red Wings |
| 2 | Kana Oyama | 19 June 1984 | 187 cm (6 ft 2 in) | 84 kg (185 lb) | 313 cm (10 ft 3 in) | 299 cm (9 ft 10 in) | Toray Arrows |
| 3 | Yoshie Takeshita | 18 March 1978 | 159 cm (5 ft 3 in) | 52 kg (115 lb) | 280 cm (9 ft 2 in) | 270 cm (8 ft 10 in) | JT Marvelous |
| 5 | Miyuki Takahashi | 25 December 1978 | 170 cm (5 ft 7 in) | 65 kg (143 lb) | 290 cm (9 ft 6 in) | 285 cm (9 ft 4 in) | NEC Red Rockets |
| 8 | Asako Tajimi | 26 June 1972 | 180 cm (5 ft 11 in) | 68 kg (150 lb) | 308 cm (10 ft 1 in) | 304 cm (10 ft 0 in) | Pioneer Red Wings |
| 9 | Sachiko Sugiyama | 19 October 1979 | 184 cm (6 ft 0 in) | 66 kg (146 lb) | 310 cm (10 ft 2 in) | 300 cm (9 ft 10 in) | NEC Red Rockets |
| 11 | Erica Araki | 3 August 1984 | 186 cm (6 ft 1 in) | 79 kg (174 lb) | 307 cm (10 ft 1 in) | 298 cm (9 ft 9 in) | Toray Arrows |
| 12 | Saori Kimura | 19 August 1986 | 184 cm (6 ft 0 in) | 66 kg (146 lb) | 298 cm (9 ft 9 in) | 293 cm (9 ft 7 in) | Toray Arrows |
| 15 | Yuki Kawai | 26 January 1990 | 168 cm (5 ft 6 in) | 62 kg (137 lb) | 280 cm (9 ft 2 in) | 275 cm (9 ft 0 in) | Higashikyushu Ryukoku High School |
| 16 | Kanako Omura | 15 December 1976 | 184 cm (6 ft 0 in) | 68 kg (150 lb) | 319 cm (10 ft 6 in) | 312 cm (10 ft 3 in) | Hisamitsu Springs |
| 17 | Yuko Sano | 26 July 1979 | 159 cm (5 ft 3 in) | 53 kg (117 lb) | 270 cm (8 ft 10 in) | 260 cm (8 ft 6 in) | Hisamitsu Springs |
| 18 | Yuki Shoji | 19 November 1981 | 182 cm (6 ft 0 in) | 66 kg (146 lb) | 315 cm (10 ft 4 in) | 296 cm (9 ft 9 in) | Pioneer Red Wings |

== Kenya ==
The following is the Kenya roster in the 2007 FIVB World Cup.

| # | Name | Date of birth | Height | Weight | Spike | Block | Club |
|---|---|---|---|---|---|---|---|
| 1 | Jane Wairimu | 24 March 1985 | 174 cm (5 ft 9 in) | 60 kg (130 lb) | 300 cm (9 ft 10 in) | 285 cm (9 ft 4 in) | Kenya Prisons |
| 3 | Diana Khisa | 26 May 1987 | 180 cm (5 ft 11 in) | 72 kg (159 lb) | 305 cm (10 ft 0 in) | 300 cm (9 ft 10 in) | Kenya Prisons |
| 4 | Doris Palang'A | 2 January 1982 | 170 cm (5 ft 7 in) | 76 kg (168 lb) | 303 cm (9 ft 11 in) | 284 cm (9 ft 4 in) | Kenya Commercial Bank |
| 6 | Catherine Wanjiru | 7 August 1978 | 180 cm (5 ft 11 in) | 87 kg (192 lb) | 300 cm (9 ft 10 in) | 292 cm (9 ft 7 in) | Kenya Pipeline Company |
| 7 | Jannet Wanja | 24 February 1984 | 175 cm (5 ft 9 in) | 59 kg (130 lb) | 299 cm (9 ft 10 in) | 287 cm (9 ft 5 in) | Kenya Pipeline Company |
| 9 | Dorcas Ndasaba | 31 March 1971 | 174 cm (5 ft 9 in) | 73 kg (161 lb) | 310 cm (10 ft 2 in) | 306 cm (10 ft 0 in) | Kenya Commercial Bank |
| 11 | Jackline Barasa | 25 December 1979 | 180 cm (5 ft 11 in) | 86 kg (190 lb) | 300 cm (9 ft 10 in) | 288 cm (9 ft 5 in) | Kenya Commercial Bank |
| 12 | Lydia Maiyo | 3 November 1988 | 185 cm (6 ft 1 in) | 75 kg (165 lb) | 325 cm (10 ft 8 in) | 315 cm (10 ft 4 in) | Kenya Prisons |
| 14 | Mercy Moim | 1 January 1989 | 183 cm (6 ft 0 in) | 72 kg (159 lb) | 320 cm (10 ft 6 in) | 308 cm (10 ft 1 in) | Kenya Prisons |
| 15 | Brackcides Khadambi | 14 May 1984 | 180 cm (5 ft 11 in) | 70 kg (150 lb) | 310 cm (10 ft 2 in) | 306 cm (10 ft 0 in) | Kenya Prisons |
| 16 | Judith Tarus | 26 June 1986 | 170 cm (5 ft 7 in) | 60 kg (130 lb) | 260 cm (8 ft 6 in) | 256 cm (8 ft 5 in) | Kenya Prisons |
| 17 | Edinah Rotich | 27 March 1981 | 180 cm (5 ft 11 in) | 73 kg (161 lb) | 307 cm (10 ft 1 in) | 300 cm (9 ft 10 in) | Friends Volleyball Club |

== Peru ==
The following is the Peru roster in the 2007 FIVB World Cup.

| # | Name | Date of birth | Height | Weight | Spike | Block | Club |
|---|---|---|---|---|---|---|---|
| 1 | Sara Joya Lobaton | 22 February 1976 | 182 cm (6 ft 0 in) | 70 kg (150 lb) | 298 cm (9 ft 9 in) | 295 cm (9 ft 8 in) | DEGIRMENDERE |
| 2 | Mirtha Uribe | 12 March 1985 | 184 cm (6 ft 0 in) | 67 kg (148 lb) | 297 cm (9 ft 9 in) | 286 cm (9 ft 5 in) | Deportivo Jaamsa |
| 4 | Patricia Soto | 10 February 1980 | 179 cm (5 ft 10 in) | 67 kg (148 lb) | 300 cm (9 ft 10 in) | 295 cm (9 ft 8 in) | CLUB DE REGATAS LIMA |
| 5 | Vanessa Palacios | 3 July 1984 | 167 cm (5 ft 6 in) | 66 kg (146 lb) | 275 cm (9 ft 0 in) | 260 cm (8 ft 6 in) | DIVINO MAESTRO |
| 7 | Yulissa Zamudio Ore | 24 March 1976 | 184 cm (6 ft 0 in) | 61 kg (134 lb) | 315 cm (10 ft 4 in) | 300 cm (9 ft 10 in) | U. San Martin de Porres |
| 8 | Milagros Moy | 17 October 1975 | 178 cm (5 ft 10 in) | 72 kg (159 lb) | 296 cm (9 ft 9 in) | 282 cm (9 ft 3 in) | ALBACETE |
| 9 | Carla Tristan | 29 January 1988 | 180 cm (5 ft 11 in) | 67 kg (148 lb) | 297 cm (9 ft 9 in) | 295 cm (9 ft 8 in) | ALIANZA LIMA |
| 10 | Leyla Chihuan | 4 September 1975 | 180 cm (5 ft 11 in) | 67 kg (148 lb) | 306 cm (10 ft 0 in) | 296 cm (9 ft 9 in) | REGATAS LIMA |
| 11 | Luren Baylon Francis | 14 August 1977 | 180 cm (5 ft 11 in) | 68 kg (150 lb) | 310 cm (10 ft 2 in) | 305 cm (10 ft 0 in) | CV CIUTADELLA |
| 12 | Carla Rueda | 19 April 1990 | 184 cm (6 ft 0 in) | 70 kg (150 lb) | 312 cm (10 ft 3 in) | 306 cm (10 ft 0 in) | Deportivo Géminis |
| 13 | Zoila La Rosa | 31 May 1990 | 176 cm (5 ft 9 in) | 57 kg (126 lb) | 285 cm (9 ft 4 in) | 280 cm (9 ft 2 in) | U. San Martin De Porres |
| 14 | Pamela Barrera | 9 September 1991 | 178 cm (5 ft 10 in) | 63 kg (139 lb) | 282 cm (9 ft 3 in) | 280 cm (9 ft 2 in) | Club Sporting Cristal |

== Poland ==
The following is the Poland roster in the 2007 FIVB World Cup.

| # | Name | Date of birth | Height | Weight | Spike | Block | Club |
|---|---|---|---|---|---|---|---|
| 1 | Katarzyna Skowronska-Dolata | 30 June 1983 | 189 cm (6 ft 2 in) | 75 kg (165 lb) | 314 cm (10 ft 4 in) | 296 cm (9 ft 9 in) | Rabita Baku |
| 2 | Mariola Zenik | 3 July 1982 | 175 cm (5 ft 9 in) | 65 kg (143 lb) | 300 cm (9 ft 10 in) | 295 cm (9 ft 8 in) | Bank BPS Muszynianka |
| 3 | Eleonora Dziekiewicz | 25 October 1978 | 185 cm (6 ft 1 in) | 75 kg (165 lb) | 307 cm (10 ft 1 in) | 295 cm (9 ft 8 in) | Calisia |
| 5 | Magdalena Sliwa | 17 November 1969 | 173 cm (5 ft 8 in) | 66 kg (146 lb) | 277 cm (9 ft 1 in) | 268 cm (8 ft 10 in) | Wisla |
| 6 | Anna Podolec | 30 October 1985 | 193 cm (6 ft 4 in) | 71 kg (157 lb) | 318 cm (10 ft 5 in) | 305 cm (10 ft 0 in) | Avtodor-Metar |
| 7 | Malgorzata Glinka-Mogentale | 30 September 1978 | 190 cm (6 ft 3 in) | 84 kg (185 lb) | 314 cm (10 ft 4 in) | 303 cm (9 ft 11 in) | VakifBank Ttelekom Istanbul |
| 9 | Agnieszka Bednarek-Kasza | 20 February 1986 | 185 cm (6 ft 1 in) | 71 kg (157 lb) | 310 cm (10 ft 2 in) | 295 cm (9 ft 8 in) | Bank BPS Muszynianka |
| 12 | Milena Sadurek | 18 October 1984 | 178 cm (5 ft 10 in) | 61 kg (134 lb) | 302 cm (9 ft 11 in) | 295 cm (9 ft 8 in) | BKS Aluprof |
| 13 | Milena Rosner | 4 January 1980 | 179 cm (5 ft 10 in) | 67 kg (148 lb) | 307 cm (10 ft 1 in) | 292 cm (9 ft 7 in) | Foppapedretti |
| 14 | Maria Liktoras | 20 February 1975 | 191 cm (6 ft 3 in) | 73 kg (161 lb) | 312 cm (10 ft 3 in) | 302 cm (9 ft 11 in) | Dinamo |
| 15 | Agata Sawicka | 17 January 1985 | 180 cm (5 ft 11 in) | 64 kg (141 lb) | 295 cm (9 ft 8 in) | 277 cm (9 ft 1 in) | Winiary |
| 16 | Klaudia Kaczorowska | 20 December 1988 | 184 cm (6 ft 0 in) | 68 kg (150 lb) | 303 cm (9 ft 11 in) | 281 cm (9 ft 3 in) | Atom Trefl |

== Serbia ==
The following is the Serbia roster in the 2007 FIVB World Cup.

| # | Name | Date of birth | Height | Weight | Spike | Block | Club |
|---|---|---|---|---|---|---|---|
| 1 | Jelena Nikolic | 13 April 1982 | 194 cm (6 ft 4 in) | 79 kg (174 lb) | 315 cm (10 ft 4 in) | 300 cm (9 ft 10 in) | VAKIFBANK Istanbul (TUR) |
| 2 | Jasna Majstorovic | 23 April 1984 | 181 cm (5 ft 11 in) | 64 kg (141 lb) | 300 cm (9 ft 10 in) | 293 cm (9 ft 7 in) | Rabita Baku |
| 6 | Jovana Brakocevic | 5 March 1988 | 196 cm (6 ft 5 in) | 82 kg (181 lb) | 309 cm (10 ft 2 in) | 295 cm (9 ft 8 in) | VAKIFBANK Istanbul (TUR) |
| 7 | Brizitka Molnar | 28 July 1985 | 182 cm (6 ft 0 in) | 69 kg (152 lb) | 304 cm (10 ft 0 in) | 290 cm (9 ft 6 in) | ATOM TREFL (POL) |
| 9 | Jovana Vesovic | 21 June 1987 | 182 cm (6 ft 0 in) | 68 kg (150 lb) | 283 cm (9 ft 3 in) | 268 cm (8 ft 10 in) | Tomis Constanta (ROM) |
| 10 | Maja Ognjenovic | 6 August 1984 | 183 cm (6 ft 0 in) | 67 kg (148 lb) | 290 cm (9 ft 6 in) | 270 cm (8 ft 10 in) | CHEMIC Police SA (POL) |
| 11 | Vesna Citakovic | 3 February 1979 | 187 cm (6 ft 2 in) | 75 kg (165 lb) | 305 cm (10 ft 0 in) | 300 cm (9 ft 10 in) | Eczacibasi SK Istanbul (TUR) |
| 12 | Ivana Isailovic | 1 January 1986 | 185 cm (6 ft 1 in) | 66 kg (146 lb) | 305 cm (10 ft 0 in) | 290 cm (9 ft 6 in) | Crvena Zvezda Beograd (SRB) |
| 13 | Maja Simanic | 8 February 1980 | 180 cm (5 ft 11 in) | 70 kg (150 lb) | 280 cm (9 ft 2 in) | 270 cm (8 ft 10 in) | ZOK Rijeka KSWO (CRO) |
| 16 | Ivana Nesovic | 23 July 1988 | 190 cm (6 ft 3 in) | 75 kg (165 lb) | 296 cm (9 ft 9 in) | 281 cm (9 ft 3 in) | Crvena Zvezda Beograd (SRB) |
| 17 | Stefana Veljkovic | 9 January 1990 | 190 cm (6 ft 3 in) | 76 kg (168 lb) | 320 cm (10 ft 6 in) | 305 cm (10 ft 0 in) | GALATASARAY Istanbul (TUR) |
| 18 | Suzana Cebic | 9 November 1984 | 167 cm (5 ft 6 in) | 60 kg (130 lb) | 279 cm (9 ft 2 in) | 255 cm (8 ft 4 in) | LOKOMOTIV Baku (AZE) |

== South Korea ==
The following is the South Korea roster in the 2007 FIVB World Cup.

| # | Name | Date of birth | Height | Weight | Spike | Block | Club |
|---|---|---|---|---|---|---|---|
| 2 | Bae Yoo-Na | 30 November 1989 | 180 cm (5 ft 11 in) | 67 kg (148 lb) | 303 cm (9 ft 11 in) | 294 cm (9 ft 8 in) | GS Caltex |
| 3 | Ji Jung-Hee | 18 March 1985 | 180 cm (5 ft 11 in) | 65 kg (143 lb) | 305 cm (10 ft 0 in) | 296 cm (9 ft 9 in) | KT&G |
| 4 | Kim Sa-Nee | 21 June 1981 | 180 cm (5 ft 11 in) | 75 kg (165 lb) | 302 cm (9 ft 11 in) | 292 cm (9 ft 7 in) | Heungkuk Life Insurance Co. |
| 5 | Kim Hae-Ran | 16 March 1984 | 168 cm (5 ft 6 in) | 60 kg (130 lb) | 280 cm (9 ft 2 in) | 270 cm (8 ft 10 in) | Korea Expressway |
| 9 | La Hea-Won | 28 June 1986 | 184 cm (6 ft 0 in) | 73 kg (161 lb) | 302 cm (9 ft 11 in) | 294 cm (9 ft 8 in) | GS Caltex |
| 10 | Kim Yeon-Koung | 26 February 1988 | 192 cm (6 ft 4 in) | 73 kg (161 lb) | 307 cm (10 ft 1 in) | 299 cm (9 ft 10 in) | FENERBAHCE |
| 11 | Han Yoo-Mi | 5 February 1982 | 180 cm (5 ft 11 in) | 65 kg (143 lb) | 307 cm (10 ft 1 in) | 297 cm (9 ft 9 in) | Korea Ginseng Corp. |
| 12 | Han Song-Yi | 5 September 1984 | 186 cm (6 ft 1 in) | 65 kg (143 lb) | 305 cm (10 ft 0 in) | 298 cm (9 ft 9 in) | GS Caltex |
| 13 | Jung Dae-Young | 12 August 1981 | 183 cm (6 ft 0 in) | 71 kg (157 lb) | 303 cm (9 ft 11 in) | 292 cm (9 ft 7 in) | GS Caltex |
| 15 | Kim Se-Young | 4 June 1981 | 190 cm (6 ft 3 in) | 73 kg (161 lb) | 309 cm (10 ft 2 in) | 300 cm (9 ft 10 in) | Hyundai Construction |
| 17 | Kwan Mi-Ran | 15 July 1981 | 174 cm (5 ft 9 in) | 57 kg (126 lb) | 291 cm (9 ft 7 in) | 282 cm (9 ft 3 in) | Korea Highway Corp |
| 19 | Yeum Hye-Seon | 3 February 1991 | 177 cm (5 ft 10 in) | 65 kg (143 lb) | 302 cm (9 ft 11 in) | 291 cm (9 ft 7 in) | Hyundai Construction |

== Thailand ==
The following is the Thailand roster in the 2007 FIVB World Cup.

| # | Name | Date of birth | Height | Weight | Spike | Block | Club |
|---|---|---|---|---|---|---|---|
| 1 | Rattanaporn Sanuanram | 9 April 1980 | 180 cm (5 ft 11 in) | 66 kg (146 lb) | 308 cm (10 ft 1 in) | 297 cm (9 ft 9 in) | Petchaboon |
| 2 | Konwika Apinyapong | 24 November 1987 | 167 cm (5 ft 6 in) | 55 kg (121 lb) | 303 cm (9 ft 11 in) | 293 cm (9 ft 7 in) | Nakhonratchasima |
| 3 | Saymai Paladsrichuay | 4 August 1987 | 180 cm (5 ft 11 in) | 74 kg (163 lb) | 308 cm (10 ft 1 in) | 291 cm (9 ft 7 in) | Yesilyurt |
| 5 | Pleumjit Thinkaow | 9 November 1983 | 180 cm (5 ft 11 in) | 63 kg (139 lb) | 298 cm (9 ft 9 in) | 281 cm (9 ft 3 in) | Bangkok Glass VC |
| 6 | Onuma Sittirak | 13 June 1986 | 175 cm (5 ft 9 in) | 72 kg (159 lb) | 304 cm (10 ft 0 in) | 285 cm (9 ft 4 in) | JT Marvelous |
| 7 | Narumon Khanan | 26 January 1983 | 180 cm (5 ft 11 in) | 66 kg (146 lb) | 311 cm (10 ft 2 in) | 289 cm (9 ft 6 in) | RBAC |
| 9 | Piyamas Koijapo | 23 October 1978 | 178 cm (5 ft 10 in) | 67 kg (148 lb) | 298 cm (9 ft 9 in) | 282 cm (9 ft 3 in) | Chang |
| 10 | Wilavan Apinyapong | 6 June 1984 | 174 cm (5 ft 9 in) | 68 kg (150 lb) | 294 cm (9 ft 8 in) | 282 cm (9 ft 3 in) | Nakornratchasima VC |
| 11 | Amporn Hyapha | 19 May 1985 | 180 cm (5 ft 11 in) | 70 kg (150 lb) | 301 cm (9 ft 11 in) | 290 cm (9 ft 6 in) | Nakhonnon VC |
| 13 | Nootsara Tomkom | 7 July 1985 | 169 cm (5 ft 7 in) | 57 kg (126 lb) | 289 cm (9 ft 6 in) | 278 cm (9 ft 1 in) | Rabita Baku |
| 15 | Malika Kanthong | 8 January 1987 | 177 cm (5 ft 10 in) | 63 kg (139 lb) | 292 cm (9 ft 7 in) | 278 cm (9 ft 1 in) | Nakhonnon-3BB VC |
| 17 | Wanna Buakaew | 2 January 1981 | 172 cm (5 ft 8 in) | 54 kg (119 lb) | 292 cm (9 ft 7 in) | 277 cm (9 ft 1 in) | Idea khonkaen VC |

== United States ==
The following is the United States roster in the 2007 FIVB World Cup.

| # | Name | Date of birth | Height | Weight | Spike | Block | Club |
|---|---|---|---|---|---|---|---|
| 1 | Ogonna Nnamani | 29 July 1983 | 185 cm (6 ft 1 in) | 80 kg (180 lb) | 315 cm (10 ft 4 in) | 305 cm (10 ft 0 in) | VK Prostejov |
| 2 | Danielle Scott-Arruda | 1 October 1972 | 188 cm (6 ft 2 in) | 84 kg (185 lb) | 325 cm (10 ft 8 in) | 302 cm (9 ft 11 in) | Praia Clube |
| 3 | Tayyiba Haneef-Park | 23 March 1979 | 200 cm (6 ft 7 in) | 82 kg (181 lb) | 328 cm (10 ft 9 in) | 312 cm (10 ft 3 in) | Igtisadchi Baku |
| 4 | Lindsey Berg | 16 July 1980 | 173 cm (5 ft 8 in) | 75 kg (165 lb) | 287 cm (9 ft 5 in) | 274 cm (9 ft 0 in) | GSO Villa Cortese |
| 5 | Stacy Sykora | 24 June 1977 | 176 cm (5 ft 9 in) | 61 kg (134 lb) | 305 cm (10 ft 0 in) | 295 cm (9 ft 8 in) | Clube Desportivo Futuro |
| 6 | Logan Tom | 25 May 1981 | 186 cm (6 ft 1 in) | 80 kg (180 lb) | 306 cm (10 ft 0 in) | 297 cm (9 ft 9 in) | Fenerbahce Acibadem |
| 7 | Heather Bown | 29 November 1978 | 188 cm (6 ft 2 in) | 90 kg (200 lb) | 301 cm (9 ft 11 in) | 290 cm (9 ft 6 in) | Azerrail Baku |
| 9 | Jennifer Tamas | 23 November 1982 | 191 cm (6 ft 3 in) | 82 kg (181 lb) | 315 cm (10 ft 4 in) | 301 cm (9 ft 11 in) | Azerrail Baku |
| 10 | Kimberly Glass | 18 August 1984 | 190 cm (6 ft 3 in) | 75 kg (165 lb) | 314 cm (10 ft 4 in) | 299 cm (9 ft 10 in) | Guangdong Evergrande Club |
| 11 | Robyn Ah Mow-Santos | 15 September 1975 | 172 cm (5 ft 8 in) | 67 kg (148 lb) | 291 cm (9 ft 7 in) | 281 cm (9 ft 3 in) | VBC Volero Zurich |
| 15 | Nicole Davis | 24 April 1982 | 167 cm (5 ft 6 in) | 73 kg (161 lb) | 284 cm (9 ft 4 in) | 266 cm (8 ft 9 in) | E.S. Cannet Rocheville VB |

== See also ==
- 2007 FIVB Volleyball Men's World Cup squads
