= Marianne Steinbrecher =

Brazilian volleyball player

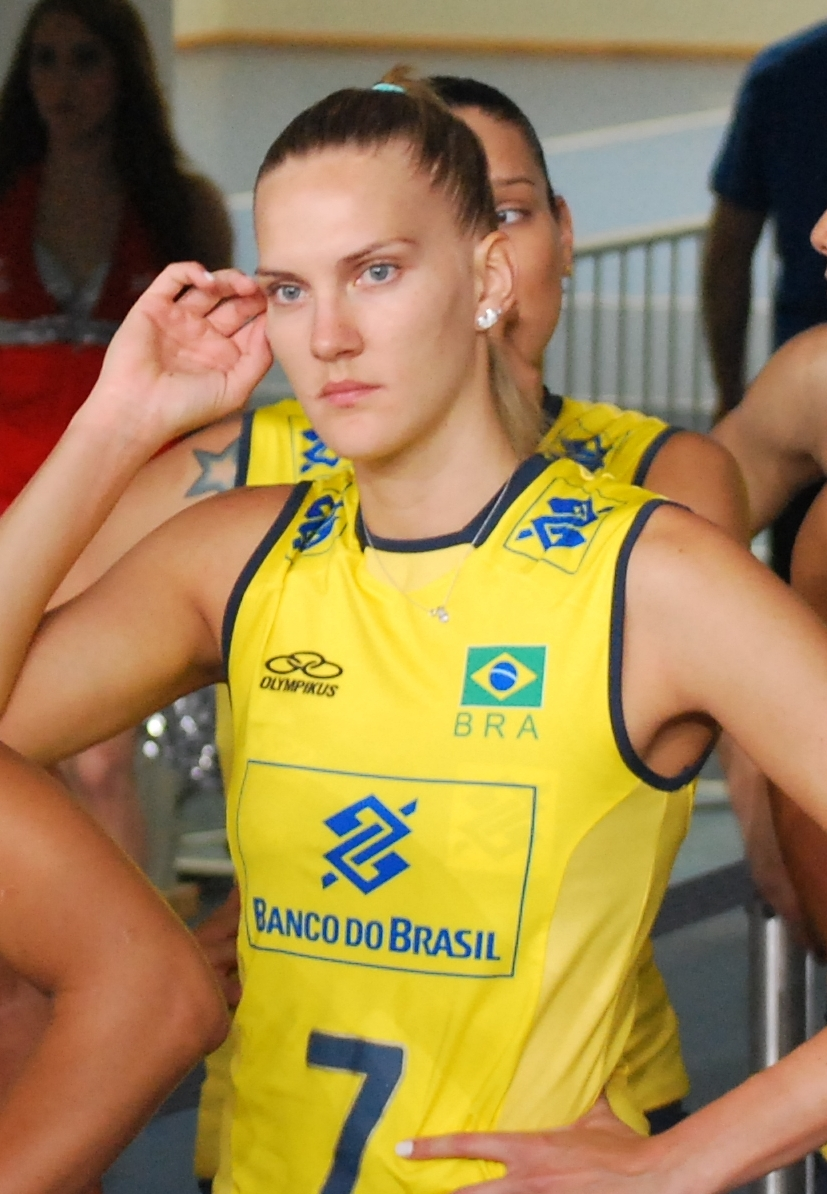

Personal information
- Full name: Marianne Steinbrecher
- Nickname: Mari
- Born: August 23, 1983 (age 43); São Paulo, Brazil
- Height: 1.88 m (6 ft 2 in)
- Spike: 320 cm (126 in)
- Block: 308 cm (121 in)

Volleyball information
- Position: Outside spiker
- Current club: Retired

Career
| Years | Teams |
|---|---|
| 1996–1999 | Rolândia/Faccar |
| 1999–2000 | Grêmio Londrinense |
| 2000–2003 | BCN/Osasco |
| 2003–2005 | Finasa/Osasco |
| 2006–2008 | Scavolini Pesaro |
| 2008–2010 | São Caetano/Blausiegel |
| 2010–2012 | Unilever Volley |
| 2012–2013 | Fenerbahçe Istanbul |
| 2013–2014 | Praia Clube |
| 2014–2015 | Molico/Nestlé Osasco |
| 2015–2016 | Jakarta Pertamina Energi |
| 2016–2017 | Vôlei Bauru |
| 2020-2021 | Fluminense |

National team
| 2004–2012 | Brazil |
Honours
Women's volleyball
Representing Brazil
Olympic Games
| Gold medal – first place | 2008 Beijing | Team |
World Championship
| Silver medal – second place | 2006 Japan | Team |
World Grand Champions Cup
| Silver medal – second place | 2009 Tokyo/Fukuoka | Team |
World Grand Prix
| Gold medal – first place | 2004 Reggio Calabria | Team |
| Gold medal – first place | 2006 Reggio Calabria | Team |
| Gold medal – first place | 2008 Yokohama | Team |
| Gold medal – first place | 2009 Tokyo | Team |
| Silver medal – second place | 2010 Ningbo | Team |
| Silver medal – second place | 2012 Ningbo | Team |
Pan American Games
| Gold medal – first place | 2011 Guadalajara | Team |
| Silver medal – second place | 2007 Rio de Janeiro | Team |
Pan-American Cup
| Gold medal – first place | 2006 San Juan | Team |
| Gold medal – first place | 2009 Miami | Team |
Final Four Cup
| Gold medal – first place | 2008 Fortaleza | Team |
South American Championship
| Gold medal – first place | 2009 Porto Alegre | Team |
| Gold medal – first place | 2011 Callao | Team |

Marianne Steinbrecher (born August 23, 1983) is a Brazilian volleyball player, who plays as a wing spiker at Molico/Osasco. She represented her native country at the 2008 Summer Olympics in Beijing, China, in which she helped her country win the gold medal.

== Life and career ==
Born in São Paulo, Steinbrecher, who is of Russian and German descent, started playing volleyball when she was 14 years old. After playing for Rolândia/Faccar and Grêmio Londrinense, she professionalized while playing for Osasco. Playing for Osasco, she won the Salonpas Cup in 2001, in 2002 and in 2005, the Campeonato Paulista in 2003, and the Superliga in 2003–04. In 2006, she left Osasco and joined Italian club Scavolini Pesaro. In 2008, she returned to Brazil to play for São Caetano/Blausiegel in the Copa Brasil. In 2010, she signed a contract with the Brazilian club Unilever Volley. She played with Fenerbahçe in the 2012 FIVB Club World Championship held in Doha, Qatar and helped her team to win the bronze medal after defeating Puerto Rico's Lancheras de Cataño 3–0.

== National team ==
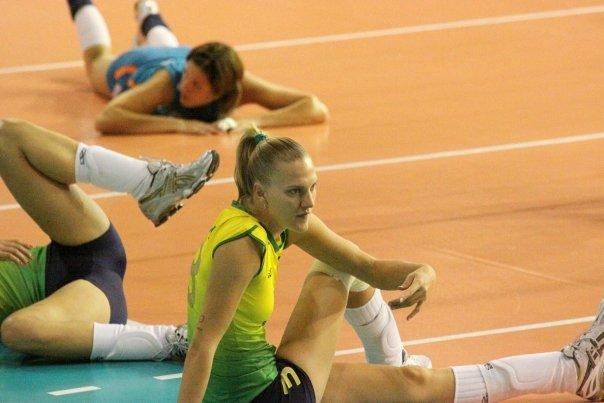
.

Playing for the national team, she won the FIVB World Grand Prix in 2004, in 2006, in 2008 and in 2009. In the 2008 FIVB World Grand Prix, she was awarded the competition's Most Valuable Player (MVP). Steinbrecher participated in the 2004 Summer Olympics, in which her country finished in the fourth place, after being defeated by Cuba in the bronze medal match. In the 2007 Pan American Games, she won the silver medal, after her country was defeated by Cuba in the final. In 2008, on her birthday, in Beijing, Steinbrecher won her first gold medal in the Olympic Games, after her country beat the United States 3–1 in the gold medal match.

Mari took part of the National Team who won the gold medal at the 2011 Pan American Games held in Guadalajara, Mexico.

== Personal life ==
Marianne came out when the newspaper Extra reported her and her girlfriend.

== Awards ==
=== Individuals ===
- 2003–04 Brazilian Superliga – "Best scorer"
- 2003–04 Brazilian Superliga – "Best spiker"
- 2004–05 Brazilian Superliga – "Best server"
- 2006 Pan-American Cup – "Most valuable player"
- 2006 Pan-American Cup – "Best spiker"
- 2008 World Grand Prix – "Most valuable player"
- 2011 South American Championship – "Best spiker"
- 2015 South American Club Championship – "Best opposite spiker"

=== Clubs ===
- 2001–02 Brazilian Superliga – Runner-up, with Vôlei Osasco
- 2002–03 Brazilian Superliga – Champion, with Vôlei Osasco
- 2003–04 Brazilian Superliga – Champion, with Vôlei Osasco
- 2004–05 Brazilian Superliga – Champion, with Vôlei Osasco
- 2006 Supercoppa Italiana – Champion, with Scavolini Pesaro
- 2007–08 Italian Serie A1 – Champion, with Scavolini Pesaro
- 2010–11 Brazilian Superliga – Champion, with Unilever Vôlei
- 2011–12 Brazilian Superliga – Runner-up, with Unilever Vôlei
- 2012 FIVB Club World Championship – Bronze medal, with Fenerbahçe
- 2012–13 Women's CEV Cup – Runner-up, with Fenerbahçe
- 2012-13 Turkish Volleyball League – Bronze medal, with Fenerbahçe
- 2014–15 Brazilian Superliga – Runner-up, with Molico Osasco
- 2015 South American Club Championship – Champion, with Molico Osasco

Awards
| Preceded by (Netherlands) Manon Flier | Most Valuable Player of FIVB World Grand Prix; 2008 | Succeeded by (Brazil) Sheilla Castro |
