= Evelyn Carrera =

Dominican Republic volleyball player

Personal information
- Full name: Evelyn Carrera Pichardo
- Nationality: Dominican Republic
- Born: 5 October 1971 (age 55); Santo Domingo
- Hometown: Santo Domingo
- Height: 1.82 m (6 ft 0 in)
- Weight: 70 kg (154 lb)
- Spike: 302 cm (119 in)
- Block: 297 cm (117 in)

Volleyball information
- Position: Libero

National team
1998–2006	Dominican Republic
Honours
Women's volleyball
Representing the Dominican Republic
Pan American Games
Gold medal – first place	2003 Santo Domingo	Team
Central American and Caribbean Games
Gold medal – first place	2002 San Salvador	Team
Gold medal – first place	2006 Cartagena	Team
Silver medal – second place	1998 Maracaibo	Team
Pan-American Cup
Silver medal – second place	2005 Santo Domingo	Team
Silver medal – second place	2003 Saltillo	Team
Silver medal – second place	2002 Mexicali	Team
Bronze medal – third place	2004 Mexicali/Tijuana	Team
Bronze medal – third place	2006 San Juan	Team
- Last updated: October 2011

Evelyn Carrera Pichardo (born 5 October 1971, in Santo Domingo) is a retired female volleyball player from the Dominican Republic, who competed at the 2004 Summer Olympics in Athens, Greece, wearing the number #5 jersey. There she ended up in eleventh place with the Dominican Republic women's national team. Carrera played as a libero.

== Career ==
Carrera win the silver medal at the 2002 Pan-American Cup held in Mexicali, Mexico; she also was awarded Best Libero for the tournament.

She won the gold medal and the Best Libero award with the national squad at the 2003 Pan American Games.

Carrera was named Best Digger and Best Libero at the 2004 Pan-American Cup.

Playing professionally in the Puerto Rico's Liga de Voleibol Superior Femenino, she was awarded as the Best Libero, and among the All Star Team 2006.

Carrera tested positive to the synthetic anabolic steroid Clostebol during the 2006 FIVB World Championship, she was sentenced to a 1-year suspension by the FIVB.

=== Beach Volleyball ===
During the Holy Week Sport Festival held in Hato Mayor, Carrera played Beach Volleyball (three) with Yenifer Calcaño and Brenda Castillo, winning the Gold Medal of the event.

== Clubs ==
- (Dominican Republic) Los Trinitarios (1996)
- (Puerto Rico) Chicas de San Juan (1997)
- (Italy) Rio Marsì Pa (2000–2001)
- (Puerto Rico) Chicas de San Juan (2002)
- (Dominican Republic) Modeca (2005)
- (Puerto Rico) Leonas de Ponce (2004–2006)
- (Puerto Rico) Vaqueras de Bayamón (2007)
- (Dominican Republic) Espaillat (2008)
- (Dominican Republic) La Romana (2008)
- (Puerto Rico) Indias de Mayagüez (2009)

== Awards ==
=== Individuals ===
- 2000–2001 Italian League All-Star
- 2002 Pan-American Cup "Best Libero"
- 2003 Pan-American Cup "Best Libero"
- 2003 Pan-American Games "Best Libero"
- 2004 Pan-American Cup "Best Digger"
- 2004 Pan-American Cup "Best Libero"
- 2005 Puerto Rican League, "Libero of the Year"
- 2006 Puerto Rican League, "All-Star"
- 2006 Puerto Rican League, "Libero of the Year"
- 2006 Puerto Rican League, "Defense Leader"

=== Beach Volleyball ===
- 2009 Hato Mayor Beach Volleyball Tournament Gold Medal
