= Ana Mercado =

Mexican volleyball player (born 1983)

Personal information
- Born: 19 February 1983 (age 43); Sonora, Mexico
- Hometown: Nogales
- Height: 185 cm (73 in)
- Weight: 82 kg (181 lb)
- Education: Missouri Baptist University

Volleyball information
- Position: Outside hitter
- Number: 8 (national team)

Career
Years	Teams
2005, 2006	Missouri Baptist University

National team
2005-2006	Mexico

Ana Mercado (born 19 February 1983, in Tepic) is a retired Mexican female volleyball player. She was part of the Mexico women's national volleyball team.

At the 2005 Women's Pan-American Volleyball Cup in Santo Domingo, Dominican Republic, Mercado was awarded for the best server. She scored during the tournament 25 serving aces and she still holds (as of 2015) the Pan American Cup record for most serving aces. She was selected as the most valuable player in the 2005 American Midwest Conference.

Mercado studied at the Missouri Baptist University.

== Palmares ==
2005
7th: 2005 Women's Pan-American Volleyball Cup
7th: 2005 Women's NORCECA Volleyball Championship
2006
4th: 2006 Central American and Caribbean Games
9th: 2006 Women's Pan-American Volleyball Cup

== Awards ==
- 2005 Women's Pan-American Volleyball Cup - best server
- 2005 American Midwest Conference - most valuable player
