= Yudelkys Bautista =

Dominican Republic volleyball player

Personal information
- Full name: Yudelkys Bautista
- Nationality: Dominican Republic
- Born: 5 December 1974 (age 51); Santo Domingo
- Hometown: Santo Domingo
- Height: 1.93 m (6 ft 4 in)
- Weight: 68 kg (150 lb)
- Spike: 312 cm (123 in)
- Block: 308 cm (121 in)

Volleyball information
- Position: Middle blocker

National team
1998–2005	Dominican Republic
Honours
Women's volleyball
Representing the Dominican Republic
Central American and Caribbean Games
Gold medal – first place	2002 San Salvador	Team
Silver medal – second place	1998 Maracaibo	Team
Pan American Games
Gold medal – first place	2003 Santo Domingo	Team
NORCECA Championship
Bronze medal – third place	2001 Santo Domingo	Team
Bronze medal – third place	2003 Santo Domingo	Team
Bronze medal – third place	2005 Port of Spain	Team
Pan-American Cup
Silver medal – second place	2005 Santo Domingo	Team
- Last updated: July 2010

Yudelkys Bautista (born 5 December 1974, in Santo Domingo) is a retired volleyball player from the Dominican Republic. She competed at the 2004 Summer Olympics in Athens, Greece, wearing the number #3 jersey. There, she ended up in eleventh place with the Dominican Republic women's national team. Bautista played as a middle blocker.

== Career ==
Bautista won the gold medal with the national squad at the 2003 Pan American Games and was selected the "Most Valuable Player". For her 2003 performance, she was also named the 2003 Dominican Republic "Volleyball Player of the Year".

Bautista won the silver medal and the "Most Valuable Player" award at the 2005 Pan-American Cup, held in Santo Domingo, Dominican Republic.

== Clubs ==
- (Italy) Rio Marsì Palermo (1999–2000)
- (Spain) Tenerife Marichal (2002–2003)
- (Dominican Republic) Mirador (2000–2004)
- (Italy) Kab Holding Sassuolo (2003–2004)
- (Italy) Volley Modena (2004–2005)
- (Spain) Hotel Cantur Las Palmas (2005–2006)
- (Dominican Republic) Modeca (2005)

== Awards ==
=== Individuals ===
- 2003 Pan-American Games "Most Valuable Player"
- 2003 Dominican Republic "Volleyball Player of the Year"
- 2005 Pan-American Cup "Most Valuable Player"

=== Clubs ===
- 2002 Spanish Supercopa – Champion, with Tenerife Marichal
- 2003 Spanish Queen Cup – Champion, with Tenerife Marichal
- 2003 Spanish Superliga – Champion, with Tenerife Marichal
- 2005 Spanish Supercopa – Runner-Up, with Hotel Cantur
- 2006 Spanish Superliga – Runner-Up, with Hotel Cantur
- 2006 Spanish Queen Cup – Runner-Up, with Hotel Cantur
