= Antonella Bortolozzi =

Argentine volleyball player (born 1986)

Antonella Bortolozziz

Personal information
- Full name: Antonella Bortolozzi
- Nationality: Argentinian
- Born: 22 January 1986 (age 40)
- Hometown: San Jerónimo
- Height: 1.82 m (6 ft 0 in)
- Weight: 72 kg (159 lb)
- Spike: 298 cm (117 in)
- Block: 278 cm (109 in)

Volleyball information
- Current club: Boca Juniors

National team
2011	Argentina

Antonella Bortolozzi (born 22 January 1986) is an Argentine volleyball player who is a member of the Argentina national team.

== Career ==
She participated at the 2005 Women's Pan-American Volleyball Cup, 2006 Women's Pan-American Volleyball Cup, and 2011 FIVB Volleyball Women's World Cup.
