= Nancy Metcalf =

American indoor volleyball player (born 1978)

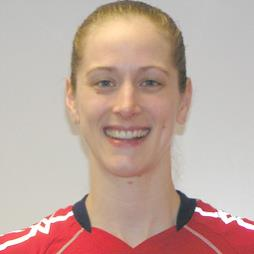
- Metcalf during the 2005–06 season with Arzano Volley

Personal information
- Full name: Nancy Jean Metcalf
- Nationality: American
- Born: Nancy Jean Meendering; November 12, 1978 (age 47); Sioux Center, Iowa, U.S.
- Hometown: Hull, Iowa; Lincoln, Nebraska
- Height: 1.84 m (6 ft 0 in)
- Weight: 75 kg (165 lb)
- Spike: 314 cm (124 in)
- Block: 292 cm (115 in)

Volleyball information
- Position: Opposite

Career
Years	Teams
1998–2001; 2002–03; 2003–04; 2005; 2005–06; 2006; 2006–07; 2007–09; 2009–10; 2010; 2010–12; 2012–13; 2013–14	University of Nebraska; Indias de Mayagüez; Despar Sirio Perugia; Indias de Mayagüez; Arzano Volley; Eczacıbaşı Zentiva; Grupo 2002 Murcia; Eczacıbaşı Zentiva; Minas Tênis Clube; Criollas de Caguas; Lokomotiv Baku; Igtisadchi Baku; Ageo Medics

National team
2000–2012	(United States) USA
Medal record
Women's volleyball
Representing the United States
World Championship
Silver medal – second place	2002 Germany	Team
FIVB World Cup
Bronze medal – third place	2003 Japan	Team
World Grand Prix
Gold medal – first place	2012 Ningbo	Team
Bronze medal – third place	2003 Andria	Team
Bronze medal – third place	2004 Reggio Calabria	Team
NORCECA Championship
Gold medal – first place	2003 Santo Domingo	Team
Gold medal – first place	2005 Port Of Spain	Team
Pan-American Cup
Gold medal – first place	2003 Saltillo	Team
Bronze medal – third place	2010 Rosarito & Tijuana	Team
Bronze medal – third place	2011 Ciudad Juárez	Team
Final Four Cup
Silver medal – second place	2009 Lima	Team

Nancy Jean Metcalf (née Meendering; born November 12, 1978) is an American indoor volleyball player. She represented the United States at the 2004 Summer Olympics in Athens, Greece, where she finished in fifth place with the USA National Team. She missed the 2008 Olympics with a torn labrum, and was not named to the national team in 2012.

== Early life ==
Nancy Meendering is the second of four children born to Harry and Dee Meendering. She attended Western Christian High School, where she earned two state titles in volleyball and made it to the all-state squad three times. In addition, she is Western's career leader in kills, kills per game and blocks. She was inducted into the Iowa Sports Hall of Fame in May 2012.

== Career ==
Metcalf graduated from the University of Nebraska–Lincoln in December 2001 with a bachelor's degree in advertising, and joined the national team in January 2000. While playing in college, in 1999 she set Nebraska's school record for kills per game (5.09) and attacks per game (12.17) and broke the Huskers' single-match record for kills with 39. She finished her career at Nebraska ranked third for career kills (1,603), third for attacks (3,741), ninth for block assists (376) and tenth with total blocks (412)

She started playing professionally in Puerto Rico in 2002, playing two years with Indias de Mayagüez and being elected MVP for the 2002 season, and Best Scorer and Spiker in both 2002 and 2003 seasons.

In 2002, she earned a silver medal at the World Championships in Germany and the bronze medal at the 2003 World Grand Prix.

She won the gold medal at the 2003 NORCECA Championship in Santo Domingo, qualifying for the 2003 World Cup. At the 2003 World Cup, her team took a berth for the 2004 Summer Olympic Games in Athens, Greece.

In 2004, she played professionally for Despar Sirio Perugia in Italy. She won the silver medal at the 2004 edition of the Montreux Volley Masters.

The next year, Metcalf participated in the Pan-American Cup, ending up in 4th place and taking home the "Best Scorer" award. Later that season, she was awarded "Most Valuable Player" at the NORCECA Championship won by her national team. Metcalf returned to the Indias de Mayagüez for the semifinal round of the 2005 season. Later that year, she signed with Arzano Volley in Italy for the 2005–2006 season, but transferred to the Turkish club Eczacıbaşı Zentiva due to Arzano's financial problems.

Metcalf spent the 2006–2007 season with the Spanish club Grupo 2002 Murcia winning the "Copa de la Reina", Spanish Supercopa, Spanish Superliga (Superliga Femenina de Voleibol), and the CEV Top Teams Cup.

Metcalf then returned to Turkey, playing for Eczacıbaşı Zentiva from 2007 to 2009. She was selected to the 2008 All Star Game, and awarded with her team Runner-Up from the Turkish League Championship, losing to Fenerbahçe Acıbadem in the final game.

Her team finished fourth at the 2009 NORCECA Championship, but she took the "Best Spiker" honor.

She played the 2009–2010 season with Minas Tênis Clube in Brazil. From 2010 to 2013, Metcalf played in Azerbaijan, with the clubs Lokomotiv Baku and Igtisadchi Baku. Metcalf played her final season with the Ageo Medics in 2013–2014.

== Personal ==
She married Jason Metcalf in 2001.

== Awards ==
=== College ===
- 2011 #7 Jersey Retired
- 2001 Verizon/CoSIDA Academic All-American of the Year
- 2001 AVCA First-Team All-American
- 2001 AVCA Central All-Region Team
- 2001 AVCA Player of the Year Candidate
- 2001 NCAA Today's Top VIII Award
- 2001 MVP of State Farm/NACWAA Tournament
- 2001 Big 12 Player of the Year
- 2001 Big 12 Player of the Week (Oct. 1)
- 2001 First-Team All-Big 12
- 2001 ASICS/Volleyball Magazine First-Team All-American
- 1999 AVCA First-Team All-American
- 1999 Big 12 Player of the Year
- 1999 First-Team All-Big 12
- 1999 AVCA First-Team District VII
- 1999 NCAA Pacific Region All-Tournament Team
- 1999 Big 12 Player of the Week (Sept. 6)
- 1998 AVCA First-Team All-American
- 1998 AVCA First-Team District V
- 1998 ASICS/Volleyball Magazine Second-Team All-American
- 1998 NCAA Pacific Region All-Tournament MVP
- 1998 First-Team All-Big 12
- 1998 Nebraska US Bank All-Tournament Team
- 1998 San Diego State All-Tournament Team

=== Individuals ===
- 2002 Puerto Rican League "Most Valuable Player"
- 2002 Puerto Rican League "Best Scorer"
- 2002 Puerto Rican League "Best Spiker"
- 2003 Puerto Rican League "Best Scorer"
- 2003 Puerto Rican League "Best Spiker"
- 2008 Turkish League "All-Star"
- 2005 NORCECA Championship "Most Valuable Player"
- 2005 Pan-American Cup "Best Scorer"
- 2009 NORCECA Championship "Best Spiker"
- 2009 USA Volleyball Indoor Female Player of the Year

=== National team ===
- 2004 Montreux Volley Masters, Silver Medal

=== Clubs ===
- 2006 Turkish League – Champion, with Eczacıbaşı Zentiva
- 2006 Spanish Supercopa – Champion, with Grupo 2002 Murcia
- 2007 Superliga Femenina de Voleibol – Champion, with Grupo 2002 Murcia
- 2007 Copa de la Reina – Champion, with Grupo 2002 Murcia
- 2007 CEV Top Teams Cup – Champion, with Grupo 2002 Murcia
- 2008 Turkish League – Champion, with Eczacıbaşı Zentiva
- 2009 Turkish League – Runner-Up, with Eczacibasi Zentiva
- 2012-13 Azerbaijan Super League - Runner-Up, with Igtisadchi Baku
