= Edinah Rotich =

- Born: 29 March 1981 (age 45); Eldoret, Kenya
- Occupations: player, manager, aide de camp
- Known for: volleyball player and aide de camp

Edinah (Edna or Ednah) Jemutai Rotich (born 29 March 1981) is a Kenyan volleyball player and national team captain. She went on to also work for First Lady Margaret Kenyatta.

== Life ==
Rotich was born in 1981 in Eldoret.

She and Gladys Munge competed at beach volleyball in 2006.

In 2007 Rotich was playing for the Friends Volleyball Club when she part of the Kenyan Team who competed for the FIVB Women's World Cup. All the other Kenyan internationals came from the Kenya Prisons or the Kenya Commercial Bank volleyball teams including Jane Wacu, Dorcas Nakhomicha Ndasaba, Janet Wanja, Mercy Moim, Catherine Wanjiru and Brackcides Khadambi. They beat Algeria to win and Ndasaba was judged best player after she gained the final point to deliver victory in straight sets.

She was chosen again in 2010 to join the 2010 FIVB Women's Volleyball World Championship squad. She was still the only choice from the Friends Volleyball Club, but Brackcides Khadambi was now the team's captain. Rotich was the team's captain in 2011 and in time she went on to manage the national team.

In February 2012 Rotich was in Algeria competing for a place in the 2012 London Olympics. The Kenyan team were the African champions but they were beaten by the home team and it was Algeria who went to the Olympics in London.

In 2014 she was in Entebbe where she and Juma Yelena won the Castle Light International Beach Volleyball Championship.

From 2014 to 2015 she was the Aide de Camp to Kenya's First Lady Margaret Kenyatta working in her office. She was still playing and winning beach volleyball cups partnered with Eunice Maiyo.

Rotich is an advocate for the Anti-Doping Agency of Kenya and she is on the advisory board of the Love Kenya Foundation.
