= Alexandra Caso =

Dominican Republic volleyball player (born 1987)

Personal information
- Full name: Alexandra Caso Sierra
- Nationality: Dominican Republic
- Born: April 25, 1987 (age 39); Santo Domingo
- Hometown: Santo Domingo
- Height: 1.68 m (5 ft 6 in)
- Weight: 59 kg (130 lb)
- Spike: 243 cm (96 in)
- Block: 241 cm (95 in)

Volleyball information
- Position: Libero

National team
2002–2005	Dominican Republic
Honours
Women's volleyball
Representing the Dominican Republic
Pan American Games
Gold medal – first place	2003 Santo Domingo	Team
Central American and Caribbean Games
Gold medal – first place	2002 San Salvador	Team
NORCECA Championship
Bronze medal – third place	2003 Santo Domingo	Team
Bronze medal – third place	2005 Port of Spain	Team
- Last updated: July 2010

Alexandra Caso Sierra (born April 25, 1987) is a volleyball player from the Dominican Republic, who competed for her native country at the 2004 Summer Olympics in Athens, Greece, wearing the number #6 jersey. There she ended up in eleventh place with the Dominican Republic women's national team. Caso played as a libero.

Playing with the Dominican Republic U-18 National Team, she won the "Best Libero", and the silver medal at the 2002 NORCECA Girls Youth Continental Championship U-18.

She claimed the gold medal with the national squad at the 2003 Pan American Games. Caso was named "Best Libero" at the 2005 NORCECA Championship.

== Awards ==
=== Individuals ===
- 2005 NORCECA Championship "Best Libero"
- 2005 Salonpas Cup "Top Receiver"
- 2002 NORCECA Girls Youth Continental Championship U-18 "Best Libero"
