= Lindsey Berg =

American volleyball player (born 1980)

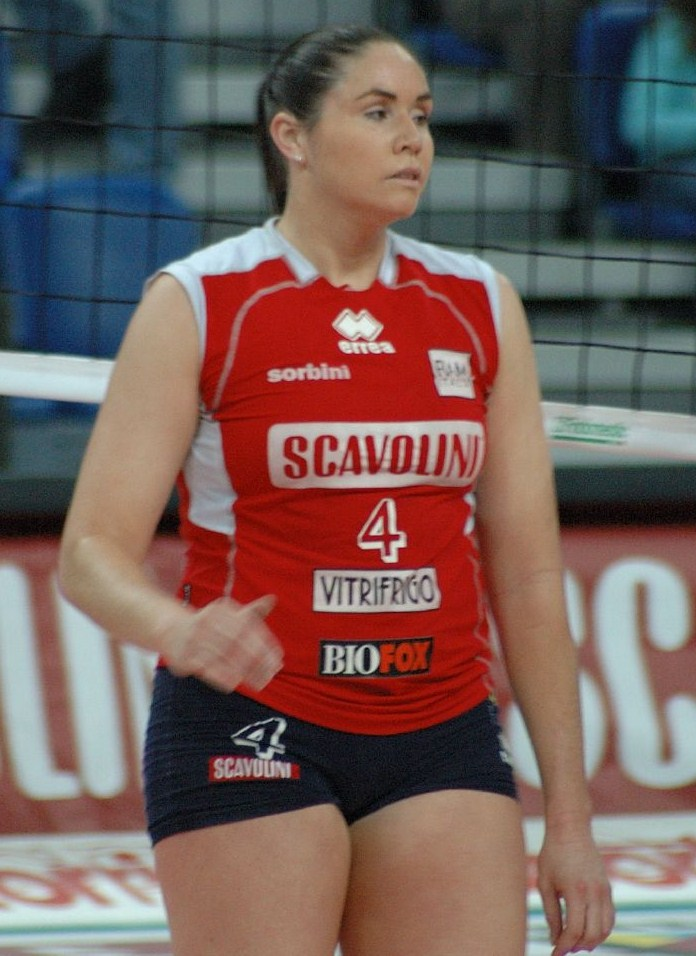

Personal information
- Full name: Lindsey Napela Berg
- Born: July 16, 1980 (age 46); Honolulu, Hawaii, U.S.
- Height: 5 ft 8 in (1.73 m)

Volleyball information
- Position: Setter
- Current club: (Turkey) Fenerbahçe Istanbul
- Number: 4 (national team)

Career
Years	Teams
1999–2001; 2002; 2004–07; 2007–08; 2009–12; 2012-2012	(United States) University of Minnesota (United States) Minnesota Chill (Italy) Scavolini Pesaro (Italy) Asystel Novara (Italy) Villa Cortese (Turkey) Fenerbahçe Istanbul

National team
2003–2012	United States
Medal record
Women's volleyball
Representing the United States
Olympic Games
Silver medal – second place	2008 Beijing	Team
Silver medal – second place	2012 London	Team
FIVB World Cup
Silver medal – second place	2011 Japan	Team
Bronze medal – third place	2003 Japan	Team
Bronze medal – third place	2007 Japan	Team
FIVB World Grand Prix
Gold medal – first place	2011 Macau	Team
Gold medal – first place	2012 Ningbo	Team
Bronze medal – third place	2003 Andria	Team
Bronze medal – third place	2004 Reggio Calabria	Team
NORCECA Championship
Gold medal – first place	2003 Santo Domingo
Gold medal – first place	2005 Port of Spain
Gold medal – first place	2011 Caguas
Silver medal – second place	2007 Winnipeg
Pan American Cup
Gold medal – first place	2003 Saltillo
Silver medal – second place	2004 Mexicali & Tijuana
Bronze medal – third place	2010 Rosarito & Tijuana
Final Four Cup
Silver medal – second place	2009 Lima

Lindsey Napela Berg (born July 16, 1980) is an American retired volleyball player who last played for Fenerbahçe Istanbul in Turkey. She was born in Honolulu, Hawaii, and played volleyball for the University of Minnesota. She played in three Olympic Games for the United States national team, winning two silver medals.

== Career ==
=== College ===
Berg attended the University of Minnesota and played on the school's volleyball team. She was named to the All-Big Ten team in 1999, 2000, and 2001. She also set a Minnesota record for most career assists.

=== Professional ===
Berg played for the Minnesota Chill of the United States Professional Volleyball league in 2002. She was named the Outstanding Server and Outstanding Setter. From 2005 to 2008, she played in the Italian Serie A League.

=== International ===
Berg joined the national team in January 2003. That year she played in all 44 of the team's matches and led the team in total assists with 1,093. She was named the best setter of the Pan American Cup and helped the U.S. win the tournament. In 2004, Berg was again named the best setter of the Pan American Cup, as the U.S. won the silver medal. She played for the team in the 2004 Summer Olympics.

Berg was named the best setter of the Pan American Cup for the third straight year in 2005, but the U.S. did not medal. She was also named best setter of the NORCECA Continental Championship, helping the U.S. win gold. In 2006, Berg played for the U.S. in the World Grand Prix. In 2007, she helped the U.S. win the bronze medal at the FIVB World Cup and the silver medal at the NORCECA Championship.

Berg was the co-captain of the team at the 2008 Summer Olympics. She played in 25 sets during the Games, and the U.S. won the silver medal. She was named the USA Volleyball Female Indoor Athlete of the Year for that year. Berg then took part of the 2009 season off to recover from surgery after the Olympics. In 2010, she played in the FIVB World Championship, and the U.S. finished fourth.

At the 2011 FIVB World Cup, Berg started 10 of 11 matches and helped the U.S. finish second and qualify for the 2012 Summer Olympics. She helped the U.S. win the gold medal at the 2011 NORCECA Volleyball Championship and was named the tournament's best setter. She also helped the U.S. win the gold medal at the FIVB World Grand Prix. She was named the USA Volleyball Indoor Female Athlete of the Year for 2011. At the 2012 Summer Olympics, Berg was the starting setter in seven of eight matches. The U.S. won the silver medal.

== Personal life ==
Berg was born in Honolulu, Hawaii, on July 16, 1980. She graduated from Punahou High School in Hawaii and the University of Minnesota.

Berg conducts youth volleyball camps. She has also been an assistant coach for University of Hawai'i Women's Volleyball team.

== Awards ==
=== Individuals ===
- 2003 Pan-American Cup "Best Setter"
- 2004 Pan-American Cup "Best Setter"
- 2005 NORCECA Championship "Best Setter"
- 2005 Pan-American Cup "Best Setter"
- 2011 NORCECA Championship "Best Setter"

=== Club ===
- CEV Cup 2012-13|2012-13 CEV Cup - Runner-Up, with Fenerbahçe
