= Candace Lee =

American volleyball player (born 1984)

Personal information
- Born: July 12, 1984 (age 42); Eugene, Oregon, U.S.
- Hometown: Colorado Springs, Colorado, U.S.
- Height: 5 ft 7 in (170 cm)
- Weight: 141 lb (64 kg)
- Spike: 114 in (290 cm)
- Block: 106 in (270 cm)
- Education: University of Washington

Volleyball information
- Position: Libero
- Number: 14 (national team)

Career
| Years | Teams |
|---|---|
| 2002-2005 | (United States) Washington |

National team
| 2006-2007 | United States |

Candace Lee (born July 12, 1984) is an American retired female volleyball player. She was part of the United States women's national volleyball team.

== Personal life ==
Lee attended high school at Winston Churchill High School. She was a top 11 student in her graduating class with a 4.0 GPA. She played both volleyball and tennis in high school.

== Career ==
=== College ===
Lee played collegiate volleyball for Washington, where she was named an AVCA Second Team All-American her senior year. By the time she ended her collegiate career, she became Washington's all-time career digs leader (2,038), which ranked second on the Pac-10 all-time list.

=== National team ===
Lee competed among others at the 2006 Women's Pan-American Volleyball Cup and also at the 2006 FIVB World Grand Prix and 2007 FIVB World Grand Prix.
