= 2004 Women's Pan-American Volleyball Cup =

Sports competition

- 2004 Women's Pan-American Cup Logo

Tournament details
- Host country: Mexico
- Dates: June 17 to 27 2004
- Teams: 10
- Venue: Gimnasio Municipal (in Mexicali and Tijuana host cities)

Final positions
- Champions: Cuba (2nd title)

Tournament awards
- MVP: (Cuba) Zoila Barros

The 2004 Women's Pan-American Volleyball Cup was the third edition of the annual women's volleyball tournament, played by ten countries from June 17 to June 27, 2004, in Mexicali and Tijuana, Mexico. The intercontinental event served as a qualifier for the 2005 FIVB World Grand Prix.

== Competing nations ==
Group A	Group B
Argentina; Canada; Cuba; Guatemala; United States	Brazil; Costa Rica; Dominican Republic; Mexico; Puerto Rico

== Preliminary round ==
=== Group A ===
	Team	Points	G	W	L	PW	PL	Ratio	SW	SL	Ratio
1.	Cuba	8	4	4	0				12	0	12.000
2.	United States	7	4	3	1				9	3	3.000
3.	Canada	6	4	2	2				6	6	1.000
4.	Argentina	5	4	1	3				3	9	0.333
5.	Guatemala	4	4	0	4				0	12	0.000

- Friday June 18, 2004

United States	3 – 0	Guatemala	25–10 25-09 25–12
Cuba	3 – 0	Canada	25–15 25–19 25–17

- Saturday June 19, 2004

Cuba	3 – 0	Argentina	25–21 25–21 25–16
United States	3 – 0	Canada	25–20 25–16 25–21

- Sunday June 20, 2004

Cuba	3 – 0	Guatemala	25- 6 25–11 25- 5
Canada	3 – 0	Argentina	25–21 25–22 25–16

- Monday June 21, 2004

Canada	3 – 0	Guatemala	25–13 25–19 25–14
United States	3 – 0	Argentina	25–16 25–22 25–19

- Tuesday June 22, 2004

Argentina	3 – 0	Guatemala	25–13 25–10 25–14
Cuba	3 – 0	United States	25–17 25–19 25–15

=== Group B ===
	Team	Points	G	W	L	PW	PL	Ratio	SW	SL	Ratio
1.	Dominican R.	7	4	3	1				10	4	2.500
2.	Brazil	7	4	3	1				10	4	2.500
3.	Puerto Rico	7	4	3	1				10	4	2.500
4.	Mexico	5	4	1	3				3	9	0.333
5.	Costa Rica	4	4	0	4				0	12	0.000

- Friday June 18, 2004

Dominican R.	3 – 1	Puerto Rico	25–18 25–17 18–25 25–23
Mexico	3 – 0	Costa Rica	25–11 25- 9 25–19

- Saturday June 19, 2004

Brazil	3 – 1	Dominican R.	21–25 25–17 25–21 25–23
Puerto Rico	3 – 0	Mexico	27–25 25–21 25–21

- Sunday June 20, 2004

Puerto Rico	3 – 0	Costa Rica	25–14 25–14 25–11
Brazil	3 – 0	Mexico	29–27 25–13 25–20

- Monday June 21, 2004

Dominican R.	3 – 0	Costa Rica	25- 7 25–22 25–12
Puerto Rico	3 – 1	Brazil	18–25 25–20 25–19 25–19

- Tuesday June 22, 2004

Brazil	3 – 0	Costa Rica	25–13 25–10 25–20
Dominican R.	3 – 0	Mexico	25–21 25–18 25–14

== Final round ==
Semi-finals
2004-06-25 – Mexicali
Cuba	3
Brazil	0
2004-06-25 – Mexicali
Dominican Republic	1
United States	3

Final
2004-06-26 – Mexicali
Cuba	3
United States	1
3rd place
2004-06-26 – Mexicali
Brazil	2
Dominican Republic	3

- Thursday June 24, 2004

Ninth Place Match

Costa Rica	3 – 0	Guatemala	25–15 25–19 25–20

Seventh Place Match

Mexico	3 – 2	Argentina	20–25 29–27 23–25 25–17 15–10

- Friday June 25, 2004

Fifth Place Match

Canada	3 – 0	Puerto Rico	25–16 25–19 25–19

Semi-finals

Cuba	3 – 0	Brazil	25–19 25–11 25–10
Dominican Republic	1 – 3	United States	16–25 28–26 18–25 21–25

- Sunday June 27, 2004

Bronze Medal Match

Brazil	2 – 3	Dominican Republic	28–26 25–20 19–25 15–25 13–15

Gold Medal Match

Cuba	3 – 1	United States	24–26 25–19 25–20 25–17

== Final ranking ==
Place	Team
1.	Cuba
2.	United States
3.	Dominican Republic
4.	Brazil
5.	Canada
6.	Puerto Rico
7.	Mexico
8.	Argentina
9.	Costa Rica
10.	Guatemala

2004 Women's Pan-American Cup winners

Cuba
Second title

- Cuba, United States, Dominican Republic and Brazil qualified for the 2005 World Grand Prix

== Individual awards ==
- Most valuable player:
  - Zoila Barros (CUB)
- Best attacker:
  - Yaima Ortiz (CUB)
- Best blocker:
  - Elisabeth Bachman (USA)
- Best digger:
  - Evelyn Carrera (DOM)
- Best libero:
  - Evelyn Carrera (DOM)
- Best receiver:
  - Cosiri Rodríguez (DOM)
- Best server:
  - Zoila Barros (CUB)
- Best setter:
  - Lindsey Berg (USA)
