= Gabriela Reyes =

Dominican Republic volleyball player (born 1992)

Gabriela Alexandra Reyes Hinojosa
Personal information
- Nationality: Dominican
- Born: 6 November 1992 (age 33)
- Height: 1.75 m (5 ft 9 in)
- Weight: 77 kg (170 lb)
- Spike: 265 cm (104 in)
- Block: 281 cm (111 in)

Volleyball information
- Position: spiker
- Number: 16

Career
- Years: Team
- 2010: (Dominican Republic) Mirador

National team
- Years: Team
- 2010: Dominican Republic

Gabriela Alexandra Reyes Hinojosa (born 6 November 1992) is a retired Dominican female volleyball player. She was part of the Dominican Republic women's national volleyball team.

She participated in the 2010 FIVB Volleyball Women's World Championship. She played with Mirador.

== Clubs ==
- (Dominican Republic) Mirador (2010)
