= Erasma Moreno =

Dominican Republic volleyball player (born 1991)

Personal information
- Nationality: Dominican
- Born: 25 November 1991 (age 34)
- Height: 1.83 m (6 ft 0 in)
- Weight: 75 kg (165 lb)
- Spike: 289 cm (114 in)
- Block: 304 cm (120 in)

Volleyball information
- Position: Wing Spiker
- Number: 13

Career
Years	Teams
2015	Mirador

National team
2015	Dominican Republic

Erasma Moreno (born 25 November 1991) is a Dominican Republic female volleyball player. She is part of the Dominican Republic women's national volleyball team.

With her club Mirador she competed at the 2015 FIVB Volleyball Women's Club World Championship.
