= Pamela Barrera =

Peruvian volleyball player (born 1990)

Personal information
- Nationality: Peruvian
- Born: 9 January 1991 (age 35)
- Height: 1.78 m (5 ft 10 in)
- Weight: 63 kg (139 lb)
- Spike: 282 cm (111 in)
- Block: 280 cm (110 in)

Volleyball information
- Number: 14

Career
Years	Teams
2011	Club Sporting Cristal

National team
2011	Peru

Pamela Barrera (born 9 january 1991) is a Peruvian female volleyball player. She was part of the Peru women's national volleyball team at the 2010 FIVB Volleyball Women's World Championship in Japan. She played for Florida A&M University.

== Clubs ==
- (Peru) Club Sporting Cristal (2011)
