= Erika Mota =

Dominican Republic volleyball player (born 1995)

Personal information
- Nationality: Dominican
- Born: 10 January 1995 (age 31)
- Height: 190 cm (6 ft 3 in)
- Weight: 89 kg (196 lb)
- Spike: 291 cm (115 in)
- Block: 280 cm (110 in)

Volleyball information
- Position: wing spiker
- Number: 14

Career
Years	Teams
2011	Mirador Santo Domingo

Erika Mota (born 10 January 1995) is a Dominican Republic female volleyball player.

With her club Mirador Santo Domingo she competed at the 2011 FIVB Volleyball Women's Club World Championship.
