= Francia Jackson =

Dominican Republic volleyball player (born 1975)

Personal information
- Full name: Francia Jackson Cabrera
- Nationality: Dominican Republic
- Born: November 8, 1975 (age 50); Santo Domingo, Dominican Republic
- Hometown: Santo Domingo
- Height: 1.68 m (5 ft 6 in)
- Weight: 71 kg (157 lb)
- Spike: 280 cm (110 in)
- Block: 275 cm (108 in)

Volleyball information
- Position: Setter
- Number: 12

National team
1998–2004, 2011-	Dominican Republic
Honours
Women's volleyball
Representing the Dominican Republic
Pan American Games
Gold medal – first place	2003 Santo Domingo	Team
Pan-American Cup
Silver medal – second place	2002 Tijuana	Team
NORCECA Championship
Bronze medal – third place	2001 Santo Domingo	Team
Bronze medal – third place	2003 Santo Domingo	Team
Central American and Caribbean Games
Gold medal – first place	2002 San Salvador	Team
Silver medal – second place	1998 Maracaibo	Team
- Last updated: October 2011

Francia Jackson Cabrera (born November 8, 1975, in Santo Domingo) is a volleyball player from the Dominican Republic, who won the gold medal with the women's national team at the 2003 Pan American Games in her home town Santo Domingo, Dominican Republic.

== Career ==
Jackson won the silver medal at the inaugural 2002 Pan-American Cup held in Mexicali, Mexico; there she was awarded "Best Setter".

Jackson was chosen to be the flag bearer at the 2004 Summer Olympics instead of the previously chosen athlete Felix Sánchez. Her team ended in the 11th place at the tournament.

Francia joined Mirador to play at the 2011 FIVB Women's Club World Championship. Her team finished in the 4th place after losing the Bronze Medal match to the Brazilian team Sollys/Nestle.

== Clubs ==
- (Dominican Republic) Mirador (2000–2004)
- (Spain) CV Murillo (2007–2008)
- (Spain) CV Laredo (2008–2009)
- (Spain) GH Ecay (2009–2011)
- (Dominican Republic) Mirador (2011)
- (Spain) CV Madrid (2015 - )

== Awards ==
=== Individuals ===
- 2002 Pan-American Cup "Best Setter"

=== Clubs ===
- 2004 Dominican Republic Distrito Nacional Superior Tournament – Champion, with Mirador

Olympic Games
Preceded by Wanda Rijo	Flagbearer for Dominican Republic; Athens 2004	Succeeded by Félix Sánchez
