= Elisabeth Bachman =

American volleyball player (born 1978)

Personal information
- Nickname: Wiz
- Born: November 7, 1978 (age 47); Minneapolis, Minnesota, U.S.
- Height: 6 ft 4 in (193 cm)
Medal record
Women's volleyball
Representing the United States
FIVB Women's World Championship
| Silver medal – second place | 2002 Germany | Team |
FIVB World Cup
| Bronze medal – third place | 2003 Japan | Team |
FIVB World Grand Prix
| Gold medal – first place | 2001 Macau | Team |
| Bronze medal – third place | 2003 Andria | Team |
| Bronze medal – third place | 2004 Reggio Calabria | Team |
NORCECA Championship
| Gold medal – first place | 2001 Santo Domingo | Team |
| Gold medal – first place | 2003 Santo Domingo |
Pan American Cup
| Gold medal – first place | 2003 Saltillo |
| Silver medal – second place | 2004 Mexicali & Tijuana |
Pan American Games
| Bronze medal – third place | 2003 Santo Domingo | Team |

Elisabeth Anne "Wiz" Bachman (born November 7, 1978) is an American retired volleyball player who represented the United States at the 2004 Summer Olympics in Athens, Greece. There she finished in fifth place with the USA National Team.

== Career ==
Elisabeth Bachman played at UCLA during her time as an undergraduate. While there she completed a highly successful Bruin career with 1,308 kills and 622 blocks, becoming the first Bruin and fifth Pac-10 player in history to record both 1,200 career kills and 600 career blocks. She set a new UCLA and Pac-10 record with a career attack percentage of .362. While at UCLA Bachman was named second-team Verizon Academic All-American, was named to Pac-10 and AVCA All-Pacific Region first teams, and three All-Tournament Teams. At the end of her season in 2000, she was named by Volleyball Magazine as Honorable Mention All-American. At the 2000 USA Volleyball Open Championships playing with the Westwood Volleyball Club of Los Angeles, Bachman won the championship and she was selected All-Tournament.

Bachman was one of nine selected to train with the USA Women's National Team in Colorado Springs, CO. She was selected from a group of 70, due to her aggressive playing on the court and her natural talent that came to her while blocking. After practicing with the team, she was selected to compete on the 2004 Summer Olympics Women's Volleyball Team in Athens, Greece.

While competing in the 2004 Summer Olympics, Bachman led her team to a four-way tie for fifth. Their first match was against China where they lost in a 3-1 match. After losing, they then played Russia where they came to a loss of 3–2.

== Personal life ==
Bachman is the youngest of three daughters to the late Todd and Barbara Bachman. She received her bachelor's degree in communication at UCLA. As of 2013, she was serving as co-chair of the Bruin Athletic Council. She has also attended the Pac-10 Leadership Conference as a BAC representative.

Bachman is married to Hugh McCutcheon, the former coach of the U.S. men and women's volleyball team and current coach of the University of Minnesota's women's volleyball team.

Her parents were attacked in an incident in Beijing when they attended the 2008 Olympics. Todd was killed, while Barbara was critically injured. A 47-year-old Chinese national identified as Tang Yongming assaulted them at the Drum Tower eight kilometres from the main Olympic site before leaping to his death from a 40-metre-high balcony.

== International competitions ==
- 2001 – Montreux Volley Masters
- 2001 – World Championship Qualifier
- 2001 – World Grand Prix(gold medal)
- 2001 – NORCECA Zone Championships
- 2001 – World Grand Champions Cup
- 2002 – World Championships (silver medal)
- 2003 – Montreux Volley Masters
- 2003 – Pan American Cup (gold medal)
- 2003 – Pan American Games (bronze medal)
- 2003 – NORCECA Zone Championships (gold medal)
- 2003 – World Cup (bronze medal)
- 2004 – Olympic Games (fifth place)

== Individual awards ==
- 2003 Pan-American Cup "Best Blocker"
- 2004 Pan-American Cup "Best Blocker"
