= 2002 Women's Pan-American Volleyball Cup =

Tournament details
- Host country: Mexico
- Dates: June 26–30
- Teams: 7
- Venue: (in Tijuana host cities)

Final positions
- Champions: Cuba (1st title)

Tournament awards
- MVP: Yumilka Ruíz (CUB)

The 2002 Women's Pan-American Volleyball Cup was the first edition of the annual women's volleyball tournament, played by seven countries from Wednesday June 26 to Sunday June 30, 2002 in Tijuana, Mexico. The intercontinental event served as a qualifier for the 2003 FIVB World Grand Prix.

== Competing nations ==
Group A	Group B
Canada; Cuba; Puerto Rico; United States	Argentina; Dominican Republic; Mexico

== Preliminary round ==
=== Group A ===
	Team	Points	G	W	L	PW	PL	Ratio	SW	SL	Ratio
1.	Cuba	6	3	3	0	255	211	1.208	9	2	4.500
2.	Canada	5	3	2	1	209	199	1.050	6	3	2.000
3.	United States	4	3	1	2	257	270	0.951	5	7	0.714
4.	Puerto Rico	3	3	0	3	210	251	0.836	1	9	0.111

- Wednesday June 26, 2002

Canada	3 – 0	United States	25–18 25–20 25–21
Cuba	3 – 0	Puerto Rico	25–23 25–18 25–14

- Thursday June 27, 2002

United States	3 – 1	Puerto Rico	25–22 27–25 24–26 25–17
Cuba	3 – 0	Canada	25–19 25–22 25–18

- Friday June 28, 2002

Canada	3 – 0	Puerto Rico	25–22 25–21 25–22
Cuba	3 – 2	United States	25–18 22–25 25–17 18–25 15–12

=== Group B ===
	Team	Points	G	W	L	PW	PL	Ratio	SW	SL	Ratio
1.	Dominican R.	4	2	2	0	150	119	1.260	6	0	6.000
2.	Mexico	3	2	1	1	147	149	0.986	3	4	0.750
3.	Argentina	2	2	0	2	136	165	0.824	1	6	0.166

- Wednesday June 26, 2002

Mexico	3 – 1	Argentina	15–25 25–16 25–18 25–15

- Thursday June 27, 2002

Dominican Republic	3 – 0	Mexico	25–14 25–21 25–22

- Friday June 28, 2002

Dominican Republic	3 – 0	Argentina	25–23 25–22 25–17

== Final round ==
Semi-finals
2002-06-29 – Tijuana
Cuba	3
Mexico	0
2002-06-29 – Tijuana
Dominican Republic	3
Canada	0

Final
2002-06-30 – Tijuana
Cuba	3
Dominican Republic	1
3rd place
2003-06-30 – Tijuana
Mexico	0
Canada	3

- Saturday June 29, 2002
  - Classification Match

Argentina	3 – 1	Puerto Rico	26–24 10–25 25–13 26–24

  - Semi-finals

Cuba	3 – 0	Mexico	25–20 25–15 25–20
Dominican Republic	3 – 0	Canada	25–15 25–20 25–13

- Sunday June 30, 2002
  - Fifth Place Match

Argentina	3 – 0	United States	25–23 25–20 25–16

  - Bronze Medal Match

Mexico	0 – 3	Canada	21–25 22–25 16–25

  - Gold Medal Match

Cuba	3 – 1	Dominican Republic	25–23 25–22 24–26 25–16

== Final ranking ==
Place	Team
1.	Cuba
2.	Dominican Republic
3.	Canada
4.	Mexico
5.	Argentina
6.	United States
7.	Puerto Rico

2002 Women's Pan-American Cup winners

Cuba
First title

  - Cuba and Dominican Republic qualified for the 2003 World Grand Prix. The Dominican Republic withdrew because of the 2003 Pan-American Games, Canada replace them.

== Individual awards ==
- Most valuable player
  - Yumilka Ruíz (CUB)
- Best spiker
  - Nancy Carrillo (CUB)
- Best blocker
  - Bibiana Candelas (MEX)
- Best digger
  - Yumilka Ruíz (CUB)
- Best receiver
  - Yumilka Ruíz (CUB)
- Best libero
  - Evelyn Carrera (DOM)
- Best server
  - Nancy Carrillo (CUB)
- Best setter
  - Francia Jackson (DOM)
