= 2003 Women's Pan-American Volleyball Cup =

2nd edition of annual women's volleyball tournament in Mexico

Women's Pan-American Volleyball Cup
Tournament details
- Host country: Mexico
- Dates: June 30 to July 5
- Teams: 8
- Venue: Centro de Convenciones (in Saltillo host cities)

Final positions
- Champions: United States (1st title)

Tournament awards
- MVP: Milagros Cabral (DOM)

The 2003 Women's Pan-American Volleyball Cup was the second edition of the annual women's volleyball tournament, played by eight countries from Monday June 30 to Saturday July 5, 2003 in Saltillo, Coahuila, Mexico. The intercontinental event served as a qualifier for the 2004 FIVB World Grand Prix.

== Competing nations ==
Group A	Group B
Brazil; Canada; Puerto Rico; United States	Cuba; Dominican Republic; Mexico; Venezuela

== Preliminary round ==
=== Group A ===
	Team	Points	G	W	L	PW	PL	Ratio	SW	SL	Ratio
1.	United States	6	3	3	0				9	0	9.000
2.	Brazil	5	3	2	1				6	3	2.000
3.	Canada	4	3	1	2				3	7	0.428
4.	Puerto Rico	3	3	0	3				1	9	0.111

- Monday June 30, 2003

Puerto Rico	3 – 1	Canada	22–25 25–22 25–18 25–23
United States	3 – 0	Brazil	25–22 25–20 25–14

- Tuesday July 1, 2003

Brazil	3 – 0	Canada	25–18 25–21 25–19
United States	3 – 0	Puerto Rico	25–15 25–20 25–21

- Wednesday July 2, 2003

United States	3 – 0	Canada	25–10 25–19 25–21
Brazil	3 – 0	Puerto Rico	25–19 25–20 25–23

=== Group B ===
	Team	Points	G	W	L	PW	PL	Ratio	SW	SL	Ratio
1.	Cuba	6	3	3	0				9	0	9.000
2.	Dominican R.	5	3	2	1				6	3	2.000
3.	Venezuela	4	3	1	2				3	7	0.428
4.	Mexico	3	3	0	3				1	9	0.111

- Monday June 30, 2003

Cuba	3 – 0	Venezuela	25–18 25–16 25–23
Dominican Republic	3 – 0	Mexico	25–21 25–19 25–16

- Tuesday July 1, 2003

Dominican Republic	3 – 0	Venezuela	27–25 25–15 25–11
Cuba	3 – 0	Mexico	25–19 27–25 25–23

- Wednesday July 2, 2003

Cuba	3 – 0	Dominican Republic	25–14 25–15 25–21
Venezuela	3 – 1	Mexico	25–21 20–25 25–15 25–21

== Classification round ==
- Thursday July 3, 2003
  - Seventh-place match

Puerto Rico	3 – 1	Mexico	25–17 13–25 25–23 25–20

  - Classification Matches

Brazil	3 – 0	Venezuela	25–23 25–19 25–18
Dominican Republic	3 – 0	Canada	25–21 25–23 25–22

== Final round ==
Semi-finals
2003-07-04
United States	3
Brazil	1
2003-07-04
Dominican Republic	3
Cuba	2

Final
2003-07-05
United States	3
Dominican Republic	0
3rd place
2003-07-05
Brazil	0
Cuba	3

- Friday July 4, 2003
  - Fifth-place match

Venezuela	3 – 1	Canada	17–25 25–20 25–16 26–24

  - Semi-finals

United States	3 – 1	Brazil	25–20 22–25 25–20 25–16
Dominican Republic	3 – 2	Cuba	24–26 23–25 25–21 25–16 17–15

- Saturday July 5, 2003
  - Bronze-medal match

Brazil	0 – 3	Cuba	16–25 19–25 30–32

  - Gold-medal match

United States	3 – 0	Dominican Republic	25–20 25–18 25–19

== Final ranking ==
Place	Team
1.	United States
2.	Dominican Republic
3.	Cuba
4.	Brazil
5.	Venezuela
6.	Canada
7.	Puerto Rico
8.	Mexico

2003 Women's Pan-American Cup winners

United States
First title

  - United States, Dominican Republic, Cuba and Brazil qualified for the 2004 World Grand Prix

== Individual awards ==
- Most valuable player
  - Milagros Cabral (DOM)
- Best attacker
  - Milagros Cabral (DOM)
- Best blocker
  - Elisabeth Bachman (USA)
- Best defender
  - Alessandra Sperb (BRA)
- Best libero
  - Evelyn Carrera (DOM)
- Best receiver
  - Logan Tom (USA)
- Best server
  - Zoila Barros (CUB)
- Best setter
  - Lindsey Berg (USA)
