= Zoila Barros =

Cuban volleyball player (born 1976)

Personal information
- Full name: Zoila Barros Fernández
- Born: 6 August 1976 (age 50); Havana, Cuba
- Height: 1.88 m (6 ft 2 in)
- Weight: 76 kg (168 lb)
- Spike: 328 cm (129 in)
- Block: 312 cm (123 in)

Volleyball information
- Position: Middle blocker
- Number: 18

National team
1998–2008	Cuba
Honours
Women's volleyball
Representing Cuba
Olympic Games
Gold medal – first place	2000 Sydney	Team
Bronze medal – third place	2004 Athens	Team
FIVB World Grand Prix
Silver medal – second place	2008 Yokohama	Team
Pan American Games
Gold medal – first place	2007 Rio de Janeiro	Team
Silver medal – second place	2003 Santo Domingo	Team
NORCECA Championship
Gold medal – first place	2007 Winnipeg	Team
Silver medal – second place	2005 Port of Spain	Team
Pan-American Cup
Gold medal – first place	2007 Colima	Team
Central American and Caribbean Games
Gold medal – first place	1993 Ponce	Team
Silver medal – second place	2006 Cartagena	Team

Zoila Barros Fernández (born 6 August 1976) is a Cuban former volleyball player and three-time Olympian. As a middle blocker, she played for the Cuban women's national volleyball team, helping the team win the gold medal in the 2000 Summer Olympics in Sydney and the bronze medal in the 2004 Summer Olympics in Athens. She also participated in the 2008 Summer Olympics in Beijing.

Barros was named Best Spiker at the 2005 Women's NORCECA Volleyball Championship in Port of Spain, where Cuba was defeated in the final by title defender United States.

== Club volleyball ==
Barros played for the Italian club Medinex Reggio di Calabria for the 1998–99 season. She played with the Russian club Uralochka-NTMK for the 2004–05 season.

== Clubs ==
- (Cuba) Ciudad Deportiva La Habana (1998)
- (Italy) Medinex Reggio di Calabria (1998-1999)
- (Cuba) Ciudad Deportiva La Habana (1999-2004)
- (Russia) Uralochka-NTMK (2004–2005)
- (Russia) Dinamo Moscow (2005–2006)
- (Cuba) Ciudad Deportiva La Habana (2002)

== Awards ==
=== Individual ===
- 2001 FIVB World Grand Prix "Best Server"
- 2003 Pan-American Cup "Best Server"
- 2003 FIVB World Cup "Best Server"
- 2003 NORCECA Championship "Best Server"
- 2004 Pan-American Cup "Most Valuable Player"
- 2004 Pan-American Cup "Best Server"
- 2004 Olympic Games "Best Server"
- 2005 NORCECA Championship "Best Spiker"

Awards
Preceded by (Brazil) Érika Coimbra	Best Server of FIVB World Grand Prix; 2001	Succeeded by (China) Yang Hao
