= 2005 Women's Pan-American Volleyball Cup =

Tournament details
- Host country: Dominican Republic
- Dates: 8–19 June 2005
- Teams: 12
- Venue(s): Pabellón de Voleibol, Centro Olímpico Juan Pablo Duarte (in Santo Domingo host cities)

Final positions
- Champions: Cuba (3rd title)

Tournament awards
- MVP: (Dominican Republic) Yudelkys Bautista

The 2005 Women's Pan-American Volleyball Cup was held from 8 to 19 June 2005 in Santo Domingo, Dominican Republic. It was the fourth edition of the annual women's volleyball tournament and was attended by twelve countries. The intercontinental event served as a qualifier for the 2006 FIVB World Grand Prix.

== Competing nations ==
Group A	Group B
Argentina; Brazil; Costa Rica; Dominican Republic; Puerto Rico; Venezuela	Barbados; Canada; Cuba; Jamaica; Mexico; United States

== Preliminary round ==
=== Group A ===
- Friday 10 June

Argentina	3 – 0	Costa Rica	25–21 29–27 25–20
Brazil	3 – 2	Puerto Rico	28–26 21–25 23–25 25–23 15–11
Dominican R.	3 – 0	Venezuela	25–20 25–17 25–23

- Saturday 11 June

Venezuela	3 – 0	Costa Rica	25–12 25–19 25–20
Brazil	3 – 1	Argentina	25–20 22–25 25–18 25–22
Dominican R.	3 – 2	Puerto Rico	22–25 21–25 27–25 25–18 15–13

- Sunday 12 June

Brazil	3 – 0	Costa Rica	25-09 25–12 25–10
Venezuela	2 – 3	Puerto Rico	23–25 25–17 23–25 25–21 10–15
Dominican R.	3 – 1	Argentina	25–20 25–20 20–25 25–16

- Monday 13 June

Puerto Rico	3 – 1	Argentina	25–22 28–26 22–25 25–20
Brazil	3 – 0	Venezuela	25–18 25–21 25–17
Dominican R.	3 – 0	Costa Rica	25-09 25–17 25–09

- Tuesday 14 June

Puerto Rico	3 – 0	Costa Rica	25–19 25–14 25–20
Venezuela	3 – 0	Argentina	25–20 25–23 25–16
Dominican R.	3 – 2	Brazil	26–24 25–20 21–25 19–25 15–12

=== Group B ===
- Friday 10 June

Barbados	0 – 3	Canada	18–25 16–25 19–25
United States	3 – 0	Jamaica	25–10 25–16 25–09
Cuba	3 – 0	Mexico	25–15 25–11 25–11

- Saturday 11 June

Canada	3 – 0	Jamaica	25–20 25–11 25–13
Cuba	3 – 0	Barbados	25–16 25–12 25–15
United States	3 – 0	Mexico	25–13 25–21 25–08

- Sunday 12 June

United States	3 – 0	Barbados	25–11 25–15 25–17
Jamaica	0 – 3	Mexico	21–25 16–25 20–25
Cuba	3 – 0	Canada	25–17 25–19 25–18

- Monday 13 June

Jamaica	0 – 3	Cuba	12–25 12–25 11–25
Mexico	3 – 0	Barbados	25–20 25–16 25–12
United States	3 – 0	Canada	25–11 26–24 25–14

- Tuesday 14 June

Barbados	3 – 0	Jamaica	25-08 25–21 25–15
Mexico	0 – 3	Canada	20–25 21–25 12–25
United States	0 – 3	Cuba	28–30 24–26 22–25

== Final round ==
Semifinals
2005-06-17 – Santo Domingo
Cuba	3
Brazil	0
2005-06-17 – Santo Domingo
Dominican Republic	3
United States	1

Final
2005-06-18 – Santo Domingo
Cuba	3
Dominican Republic	0
3rd place
2005-06-18 – Santo Domingo
Brazil	3
United States	1

=== Quarterfinals ===
- Thursday 16 June

Brazil	3 – 0	Canada	25–14 25–20 25–16
United States	3 – 1	Puerto Rico	24–26 25–21 25–22 25–20

=== Semifinals ===
- Friday 17 June

Cuba	3 – 0	Brazil	25–19 25–19 25–18
Dominican R.	3 – 1	United States	25–17 20–25 25–18 25–23

=== Finals ===
- Thursday 16 June — Eleventh place match

Costa Rica	3 – 0	Jamaica	25-07 25–15 25–11

- Thursday 16 June — Ninth place match

Argentina	3 – 0	Barbados	25-09 25–13 25–13

- Friday 17 June — Seventh place match

Venezuela	2 – 3	Mexico	25–19 21–25 23–25 25–19 12–15

- Friday 17 June — Fifth place match

Canada	0 – 3	Puerto Rico	23–25 18–25 19–25

- Saturday 18 June — Bronze medal match

Brazil	3 – 1	United States	25–22 21–25 25–22 27–25

- Saturday 18 June — Gold medal match

Cuba	3 – 0	Dominican R.	25–16 25–17 25–19

== Final ranking ==
Place	Team
1.	Cuba
2.	Dominican Republic
3.	Brazil
4.	United States
5.	Puerto Rico
6.	Canada
7.	Mexico
8.	Venezuela
9.	Argentina
10.	Barbados
11.	Costa Rica
12.	Jamaica

2005 Women's Pan-American Cup winners

Cuba
Third title

Cuba, the Dominican Republic, Brazil and the United States qualified for the 2006 FIVB World Grand Prix.

== Individual awards ==
- Most valuable player
  - Yudelkys Bautista (DOM)
- Best spiker
  - Yumilka Ruíz (CUB)
- Best scorer
  - Nancy Metcalf (USA)
- Best blocker
  - Adenizia da Silva (BRA)
- Best setter
  - Lindsey Berg (USA)
- Best digger
  - Annie Levesque (CAN)
- Best server
  - Ana Mercado (MEX)
- Best libero
  - Annie Levesque (CAN)
- Best receiver
  - Suelen Pinto (BRA)
- Best coach
  - Luis Felipe Calderón (CUB)
