= 2005 Women's NORCECA Volleyball Championship =

Tournament details
- Host country: Trinidad and Tobago
- Dates: September 4–12, 2005
- Teams: 8
- Venue(s): UWI Sports and Physical Educational Centre (in Port of Spain host cities)

Final positions
- Champions: United States (5th title)

Tournament awards
- MVP: (United States) Nancy Metcalf

The 2005 Women's NORCECA Volleyball Championship was the 19th edition of the Women's Continental Volleyball Tournament, played by eight countries from September 6 to September 11, 2005, in Port of Spain, Trinidad and Tobago.

The United States won the event, after defeated Cuba and qualified for the 2005 Women's Volleyball Grand Champions Cup, later that year in Japan. Barbados and Trinidad & Tobago were the newcomers to this competition. The Dominican Republic won the bronze medal. Nancy Metcalf of the United States was awarded Most Valuable Player.

== Competing nations ==
Group A	Group B
Barbados; Dominican Republic; Puerto Rico; Trinidad and Tobago	Canada; Cuba; Mexico; United States

== Preliminary round ==
=== Group A ===
	Team	Points	G	W	L	PW	PL	Ratio	SW	SL	Ratio
1.	Puerto Rico	6	3	3	0	225	120	1.875	9	0	MAX
2.	Dominican R.	5	3	2	1	216	151	1.430	6	3	2.000
3.	Barbados	4	3	1	2	161	226	0.712	3	7	0.429
4.	Trinidad and T.	3	3	0	3	143	248	0.577	1	9	0.111

- September 6

Dominican R.	3 – 0	Barbados	25-14 25-12 25–12
Trinidad & T.	0 – 3	Puerto Rico	14-25 09-25 06–25

- September 7

Puerto Rico	3 – 0	Barbados	25-10 25-10 25–05
Trinidad & T.	0 – 3	Dominican R.	25-08 25-20 25–10

- September 8

Dominican R.	0 – 3	Puerto Rico	23-25 21-25 22–25
Barbados	3 – 1	Trinidad & T.	25-22 23-25 25-20 25–09

=== Group B ===
	Team	Points	G	W	L	PW	PL	Ratio	SW	SL	Ratio
1.	Cuba	6	3	3	0	225	164	1.372	9	0	MAX
2.	United States	5	3	2	1	223	195	1.144	6	4	1.500
3.	Canada	4	3	1	2	210	226	0.929	4	6	0.667
4.	Mexico	3	3	0	3	152	225	0.676	0	9	0.000

- September 6

Cuba	3 – 0	Mexico	25-18 25-18 25–20
United States	3 – 1	Canada	22-25 25-17 25-22 25–14

- September 7

United States	3 – 0	Mexico	25-04 25-22 25–16
Cuba	3 – 0	Canada	25-21 25-18 25–18

- September 8

Canada	3 – 0	Mexico	25-17 25-22 25–15
Cuba	3 – 0	United States	25-13 25-22 25–16

== Final round ==
Semi-finals
2005-09-10 – Port of Spain
United States	3
Puerto Rico	0
2005-09-10 – Port of Spain
Dominican Republic	0
Cuba	3

Final
2005-09-11 – Port of Spain
United States	3
Cuba	2
3rd place
2005-09-11 – Port of Spain
Puerto Rico	0
Dominican Republic	3

=== Quarter-finals ===
- September 9

Dominican R.	3 – 0	Canada	25-22 25-19 25–14
United States	3 – 0	Barbados	25-16 25-09 25–05

=== Semi-finals ===
- September 10

Puerto Rico	0 – 3	United States	18-25 18-25 18–25
Cuba	3 – 0	Dominican R.	25-12 25-12 25–18

=== Finals ===
- September 9 — Seventh Place Match

Trinidad & T.	0 – 3	Mexico	10-25 11-25 12–25

- September 10 — Fifth Place Match

Canada	3 – 0	Barbados	25-20 25-10 25–14

- September 11 — Bronze Medal Match

Dominican R.	3 – 0	Puerto Rico	25-19 25-19 25–13

- September 11 — Gold Medal Match

Cuba	2 – 3	United States	13-25 25-22 25-27 25-20 10–15

== Final ranking ==
Place	Team
1st place, gold medalist(s)	United States
2nd place, silver medalist(s)	Cuba
3rd place, bronze medalist(s)	Dominican Republic
4.	Puerto Rico
5.	Canada
6.	Barbados
7.	Mexico
8.	Trinidad and Tobago

2005 Women's NORCECA winners

United States
Fifth title

- The United States qualified for the 2005 Women's Volleyball Grand Champions Cup

== Awards ==
- Most valuable player
  - (United States) Nancy Metcalf
- Best scorer
  - (United States) Tayyiba Haneef
- Best setter
  - (United States) Lindsey Berg
- Best spiker
  - (Cuba) Zoila Barros
- Best blocker
  - (Dominican Republic) Cindy Rondón
- Best defender
  - (Canada) Annie Levesque
- Best server
  - (Cuba) Nancy Carrillo
- Best libero
  - (Dominican Republic) Alexandra Caso
- Best receiver
  - (Puerto Rico) Aury Cruz
