= Mirador Volleyball =

Volleyball club in the Dominican Republic

- Full name: Mirador Sport and Cultural Center
- Short name: Mirador
- Founded: 1970
- Ground: National Volleyball Pavilion (Capacity: 6,000)
- Chairman: (Dominican Republic) Ricardo Arias
- Manager: (Dominican Republic) Miguel Angel Russo
- Captain: (Dominican Republic) Francia Jackson
- League: Distrito Nacional Superior Tournament
- 2006: 1st Place

Uniforms
Home	Away

The Mirador Sport and Cultural Center or simply Mirador is a women's volleyball club, based in Santo Domingo, Distrito Nacional, Dominican Republic.

== History ==
The team was found 1970.

With the help of Cosiri Rodríguez, who became the "Most Valuable Player" at the 2004 Distrito Nacional Superior Tournament, Mirador win the 9th consecutive and 23rd Championship, defeating Los Cachorros in the 7th game of the final series.

The team won in 2006 its 24th title at the Distrito Nacional Volleyball Tournament.

Mirador participated as CDN Mirador (Centro Deportivo Nacional and Mirador) at the 2008 edition of the Salonpas Cup finishing in 5th place. Bethania de la Cruz earned the Best Attacker award.

For the 2010 FIVB Women's Club World Championship, Mirador was selected as the representative from the NORCECA confederation. The team ended up in 4th place, being defeated by Bergamo in the Bronze medal Match. Brenda Castillo and Annerys Vargas shined for Mirador, earning the Best Libero and Best Blocker awards.

The NORCECA Confederation of Volleyball, selected Mirador to represent the continent at the 2011 FIVB Women's Club World Championship. The club finished in 4th. place after being defeated by the Brazilian team Sollys/Nestle. The team had Jeoselyna Rodríguez as one of the tournament Top Performers.

== Squads ==
=== 2011 ===
NORCECA representative at the 2011 FIVB Women's Club World Championship squad.

- Head coach: (Dominican Republic) Wilson Sánchez
- Assistant coach: (Dominican Republic) Cristian Cruz

Number	Player	Position
1	(Dominican Republic) Marianne Fersola	Middle Blocker
2	(Dominican Republic) Erasma Moreno	Wing Spiker
5	(Dominican Republic) Deborah Constanzo	Opposite
6	(Dominican Republic) Carmen Rosa Caso	Libero
8	(Dominican Republic) Pamela Soriano	Middle Blocker
9	(Dominican Republic) Celenia Toribio	Middle Blocker
10	(Dominican Republic) Yeniffer Ramírez	Wing Spiker
11	(Dominican Republic) Jeoselyna Rodríguez	Opposite
12	(Dominican Republic) Francia Jackson	Setter
13	(Dominican Republic) Yonkaira Peña	Wing Spiker
14	(Dominican Republic) Erika Mota	Wing Spiker
15	(Dominican Republic) Brayelin Martínez	Wing Spiker

== Palmares ==
=== NORCECA Tournament of Champions Clubs ===
- 1993 Silver Medal

=== National Championship ===
- 1975

=== Distrito Nacional Superior Tournament League Championship ===
- 1975, 1976, 1977, 1978, 1979, 1980, 1981, 1982, 1983, 1985, 1989, 1991, 1992, 1993, 1994, 1995, 1996, 1997, 1998, 1999, 2000, 2001, 2002, 2003, 2004, 2006
