= Salonpas Cup =

International women's volleyball club cup competition in Brazil

The Salonpas Cup (sometimes called Torneio Internacional de Vôlei Feminino or Women's Volleyball International Cup) is an international women's volleyball club competition held annually in Brazil. Created by DeBrito Propaganda for Hisamitsu Pharmaceutical, the tournament features clubs from several countries. It is supported by the Brazilian Volleyball Confederation and recognized by FIVB (Fédération Internationale de Volleyball). The competition is named after Salonpas, a product made by the Japanese company Hisamitsu Pharmaceutical Co. Inc, which is the tournament's sponsor.

== Competition format ==
In 2008, the six participating clubs played against each other once. The four best placed teams qualified to the semifinals, where the first placed team played against the fourth placed team and the second placed team played against the third placed team. The winners played the final, while the losers competed in a third-place playoff.

== Participating teams ==
Below is a list of the participating teams, year by year:

=== 2001 edition ===
- BCN/Osasco (Brazil)
- Rexona (Brazil)
- MRV/Minas (Brazil)
- Hisamitsu Spring Attackers (Japan)
- Club Italia Ravena (Italy)
- Gimnasia y Esgrima La Plata (Argentina)

=== 2002 edition ===
- BCN/Osasco (Brazil)
- MRV/Minas (Brazil)
- Rexona (Brazil)
- Hisamitsu Springs (Japan)
- Washington D.C. (United States)
- La Rochete France (France)

=== 2003 edition ===
- MRV/Minas (Brazil)
- ACF/Campos (Brazil)
- Blue Life/Pinheiros (Brazil)
- Brazilian youngsters national team
- Hisamitsu Springs (Japan)
- Sucre Team (Bolivia)
- Boricuas Club Team (Puerto Rico)
- Dames Volley Avo Melsle (Belgium)

=== 2004 edition ===
- Finasa/Osasco (Brazil)
- MRV/Minas (Brazil)
- Rexona-Ades (Brazil)
- Club de Regatas Lima (Peru)
- Habana Club (Cuba)
- USC-Munster (Germany)

=== 2005 edition ===
- Minas Tênis Clube (Brazil)
- Finasa/Osasco (Brazil)
- Rexona-Ades (Brazil)
- All Stars Belgian (Belgium)
- Habana Club (Cuba)
- Club Proyecto Nacional (Dominican Republic)

=== 2006 edition ===
- Rexona-Ades (Brazil)
- Finasa/Osasco (Brazil)
- Cimed/Macaé (Brazil)
- Hisamitsu Springs (Japan)
- Schweriner SC (Germany)
- River Plate (Argentina)

=== 2007 edition ===
- Rexona-Ades (Brazil)
- Finasa/Osasco (Brazil)
- Fiat/Minas (Brazil)
- CV Tenerife (Spain)
- Club ADO (Chile)
- Winiary Kalisz (Poland)

=== 2008 edition ===
- Rexona-Ades (Brazil)
- Finasa/Osasco (Brazil)
- Pinheiros/Mackenzie (Brazil)
- Scavolini Pesaro (Italy)
- Kinder Voleibol (Portugal)
- CDN Mirador (Dominican Republic)

== List of champions ==
Salonpas Cup
Year	Host	Champions	Score	Runners-up
2001	Salvador, Brazil	(Brazil); BCN/Osasco	-	(Italy); Club Italia Ravena
2002	Fortaleza, Brazil	(Brazil); BCN/Osasco	3–2	(Brazil); MRV/Minas
2003	João Pessoa, Brazil; Natal, Brazil; Recife, Brazil	(Brazil); Blue Life/Pinheiros	3–2	(Brazil); ACF/Campos
2004	São Paulo, Brazil	(Brazil); Rexona/Ades	3–0	(Brazil); Finasa/Osasco
2005	São Paulo, Brazil	(Brazil); Finasa/Osasco	3–0	(Brazil); Rexona-Ades
2006	São Paulo, Brazil	(Brazil); Rexona/Ades	3–0	(Brazil); Finasa/Osasco
2007	São Paulo, Brazil	(Brazil); Rexona/Ades	3–1	(Brazil); Finasa/Osasco
2008	São Paulo, Brazil	(Brazil); Finasa/Osasco	3–2	(Brazil); Rexona-Ades
2009	Not held

== Titles by team ==
Club	Country	Titles
BCN/Osasco (now Molico Nestlé Osasco)	Brazil	4
Rexona/Ades (now Unilever)	Brazil	3
Blue Life/Pinheiros	Brazil	1

== Titles by country ==
Country	Titles
Brazil	8
