= 2006 Women's Pan-American Volleyball Cup =

Tournament details
- Host country: Puerto Rico
- Dates: June 27 – July 8, 2005
- Teams: 12
- Venue: Coliseo Roberto Clemente (in San Juan host cities)

Final positions
- Champions: Brazil (1st title)

Tournament awards
- MVP: (Brazil) Mari Steinbrecher

The 2006 Women's Pan-American Volleyball Cup was the fifth edition of the annual women's volleyball tournament, played by twelve countries from June 27 to July 8, 2006, in the Coliseo Roberto Clemente in San Juan, Puerto Rico. The event served as a qualifier for the 2007 World Grand Prix in Ningbo, PR China. The winner of each pool automatically advanced to the semi-finals and the teams placed in second and third met in crossed matches in the quarterfinals round.

== Competing nations ==
Group A	Group B
Brazil; Canada; Costa Rica; Dominican Republic; Mexico; Puerto Rico	Argentina; Barbados; Cuba; Peru; United States; Venezuela

== Preliminary round ==
=== Group A ===
	Team	Points	G	W	L	PW	PL	Ratio	SW	SL	Ratio
1.	Brazil	9	5	4	1				14	4	3.500
2.	Dominican R.	9	5	4	1				13	4	3.250
3.	Puerto Rico	9	5	4	1				12	7	1.714
4.	Canada	7	5	2	3				8	9	0.888
5.	Mexico	6	5	1	4				4	13	0.307
5.	Costa Rica	5	5	0	5				1	15	0.066

- Thursday June 29

Brazil	3 – 1	Dominican R.	25–21 24–26 25–15 25–19
Canada	3 – 0	Costa Rica	25–15 25–20 25–06
Puerto Rico	3 – 1	Mexico	18–25 25–14 25–18 25–19

- Friday June 30

Brazil	3 – 0	Mexico	25–8 25–12 25–19
Dominican R.	3 – 0	Costa Rica	25–12 25–11 25–19
Puerto Rico	3 – 1	Canada	23–25 25–14 25–20 25–20

- Saturday July 1

Dominican R.	3 – 1	Canada	26–24 18–25 25–13 25–22
Mexico	3 – 1	Costa Rica	22–25 25–21 25–18 25–16
Brazil	2 – 3	Puerto Rico	25–19 20–25 22–25 25–18 13–15

- Sunday July 2

Brazil	3 – 0	Canada	25–22 25–21 25–12
Dominican R.	3 – 0	Mexico	25–17 25–16 27–25
Puerto Rico	3 – 0	Costa Rica	25–14 25–20 25–11

- Monday July 3

Canada	3 – 0	Mexico	25–14 25–19 25–16
Brazil	3 – 0	Costa Rica	25–13 25–13 25–16
Puerto Rico	0 – 3	Dominican R.	19–25 27–29 20–25

=== Group B ===
	Team	Points	G	W	L	PW	PL	Ratio	SW	SL	Ratio
1.	Cuba	10	5	5	0				15	1	15.000
2.	United States	9	5	4	1				13	3	4.333
3.	Peru	8	5	3	2				9	8	1.125
4.	Venezuela	7	5	2	3				4	12	0.333
5.	Argentina	6	5	1	4				6	12	0.500
5.	Barbados	5	5	0	5				0	15	0.000

- Thursday June 29

Venezuela	3 – 0	Barbados	25–10 25–20 25–07
United States	3 – 0	Peru	25–18 25–17 25–20
Cuba	3 – 0	Argentina	25–19 25–12 25–16

- Friday June 30

Cuba	3 – 0	Barbados	25-07 25–22 25–09
Peru	3 – 1	Venezuela	25–23 23–25 25–23 25–21
United States	3 – 0	Argentina	25-09 25–14 25–12

- Saturday July 1

United States	3 – 0	Barbados	25-08 25–17 25–11
Peru	3 – 1	Argentina	25–20 25–18 29–31 25–21
Cuba	3 – 0	Venezuela	25–16 25–17 25–21

- Sunday July 2

Peru	3 – 0	Barbados	25–18 25–17 25–21
Argentina	2 – 3	Venezuela	25–22 21–25 15–25 25–23 11–15
Cuba	3 – 1	United States	27–25 25–22 20–25 26–24

- Monday July 3

Argentina	3 – 0	Barbados	25–13 25-06 25–19
United States	3 – 0	Venezuela	26–24 25–20 25–14
Cuba	3 – 0	Peru	25–15 25–20 25–19

== Final round ==
Semi-finals
2006-07-06 – San Juan, Puerto Rico
Brazil	3
United States	1
2006-07-06 – San Juan, Puerto Rico
Cuba	3
Dominican Republic	1

Final
2006-07-07 – San Juan, Puerto Rico
Brazil	3
Cuba	1
3rd place
2006-07-07 – San Juan, Puerto Rico
United States	0
Dominican Republic	3

=== Quarterfinals ===
- Wednesday July 5, 2006

Dominican R.	3 – 0	Peru	25–21 25–18 25–13
United States	3 – 2	Puerto Rico	23–25 22–25 25–22 25–21 15–08

=== Semi-finals ===
- Thursday July 6, 2006

Brazil	3 – 1	United States	21–25 25–22 25–17 25–10
Cuba	3 – 1	Dominican R.	25–23 25–22 14–25 25–13

=== Finals ===
- Wednesday July 5, 2006 — Eleventh Place Match

Costa Rica	3 – 0	Barbados	25–19 25–16 25–15

- Wednesday July 5, 2006 — Ninth Place Match

Mexico	3 – 1	Argentina	25–18 23–25 25–21 25–14

- Thursday July 6, 2006 — Seventh Place Match

Canada	3 – 2	Venezuela	25–17 25–21 21–25 20–25 19–17

- Thursday July 6, 2006 — Fifth Place Match

Puerto Rico	3 – 0	Peru	25–14 25–22 25–22

- Friday July 7, 2006 — Bronze Medal Match

United States	0 – 3	Dominican R.	18–25 22–25 20–25

- Friday July 7, 2006 — Gold Medal Match

Brazil	3 – 1	Cuba	25–14 21–25 25–22 25–11

== Final ranking ==
Place	Team
1.	Brazil
2.	Cuba
3.	Dominican Republic
4.	United States
5.	Puerto Rico
6.	Peru
7.	Canada
8.	Venezuela
9.	Mexico
10.	Argentina
11.	Costa Rica
12.	Barbados

2006 Women's Pan-American Cup winners

Brazil
First title

- Brazil, Cuba, Dominican Republic and the United States qualified for the 2007 World Grand Prix

== Awards ==
- Most valuable player
  - (Brazil) Mari Steinbrecher
- Best attacker
  - (Brazil) Mari Steinbrecher
- Best scorer
  - (Puerto Rico) Aury Cruz
- Best defender
  - (Puerto Rico) Yarleen Santiago
- Best setter
  - (United States) Robyn Ah Mow-Santos
- Best server
  - (Puerto Rico) Aury Cruz
- Best receiver
  - (Canada) Stacey Gordon
- Best libero
  - (Brazil) Arlene Xavier
- Best blocker
  - (Brazil) Fabiana Claudino
- Best coach
  - (Brazil) José Roberto Guimarães
