= Yaque =

Yaque may refer to:

- Yaque or Cují Yaque, an emblematic tree in Venezuela
- Yaque del Norte River, the longest river in the Dominican Republic
- Yaque del Sur River, a river in the southwestern Dominican Republic
- Playa El Yaque, a beach in the southern side of Margarita Island, Venezuela
- Hato del Yaque, a municipal district in the province of Santiago, Dominican Republic
