= Trina de Moya =

Dominican poet and writer (1863–1941)

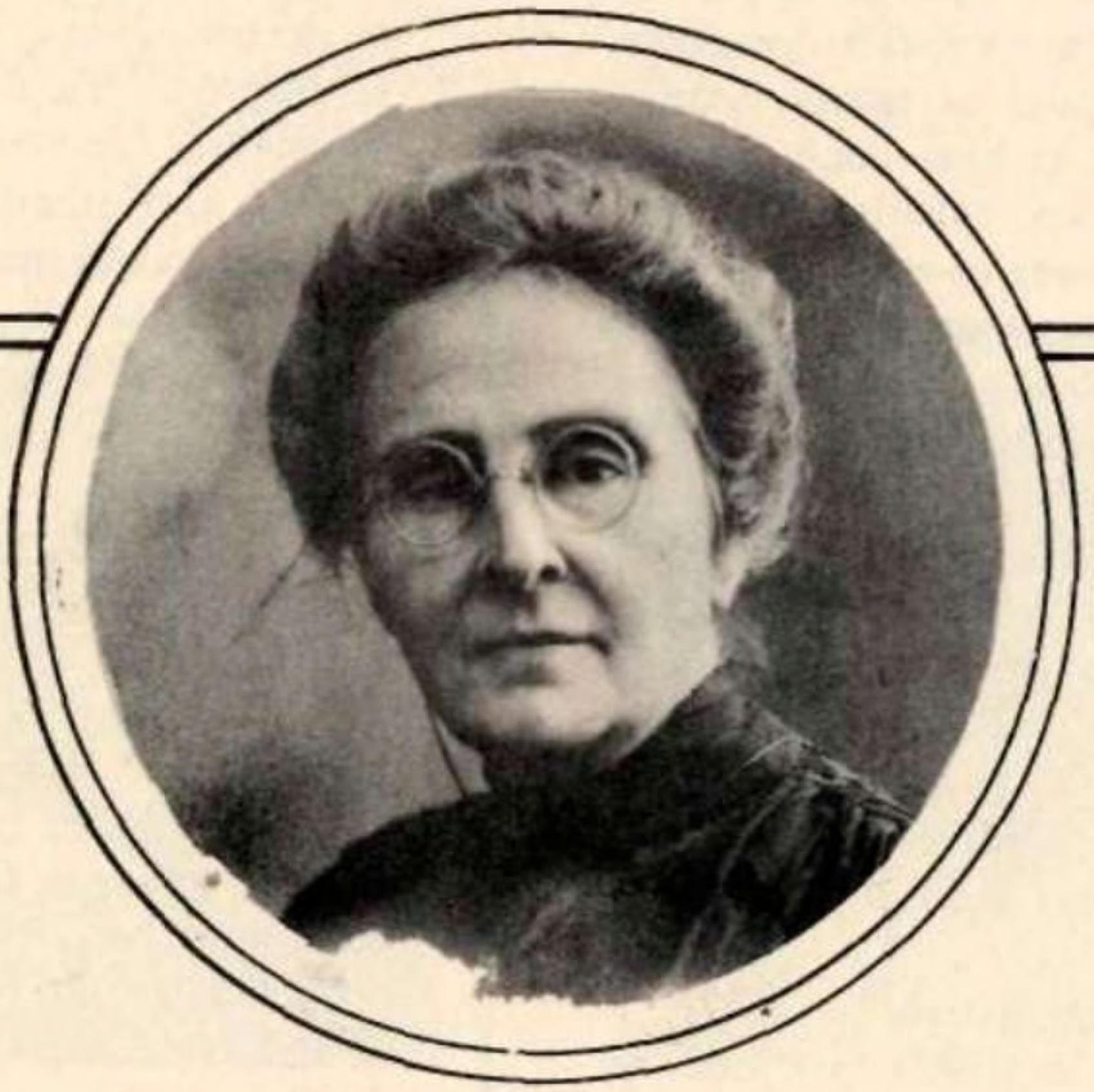

First Lady of the Dominican Republic
- In office July 24, 1924 – March 3, 1930
- President: Horacio Vásquez
- Preceded by: Natividad Lauransón Amiama (1916); Vacant(1916–1924)
- Succeeded by: Tomasina Martínez
- In office May 2, 1902 – April 23, 1903
- President: Horacio Vásquez
- Preceded by: Josefa de los Santos Domínguez
- Succeeded by: María Altagracia Ricart
- In office September 4, 1899 – November 15, 1899
- President: Horacio Vásquez
- Preceded by: María Isabel Balbina Juanes Sánchez
- Succeeded by: Josefa de los Santos Domínguez

Personal details
- Born: María de los Ángeles Trinidad de Moya Pérez; January 13, 1863 La Vega, Dominican Republic
- Died: March 13, 1941 (aged 78) Santurce, Puerto Rico
- Spouse: Horacio Vásquez (m. 1888; died 1936)

María de los Ángeles Trinidad de Moya Pérez (January 13, 1863 – March 13, 1941), known as just Trina de Moya, was a Dominican Republic poet and writer. She served as the First Lady of the Dominican Republic as the wife of President Horacio Vásquez for three nonconsecutive terms. De Moya was the first Dominican presidential wife to be called "first lady", a title which came into widespread public usage during her third tenure from 1924 to 1930.

Trina de Moya's best known literary works include the Dominican version of Himno a la Madre, a Latin American hymn dedicated to mothers, which premiered on May 30, 1926. She often published her poetry and other writings under the literary pseudonyms "T. Colombina" and "Angela".

== Biography ==
Trina de Moya was born in La Vega, Dominican Republic, on January 13, 1863. Her parents, Román Martín de Moya Portes and Antonia Mauricia Pérez, had eight children, including herself. De Moya and her family were relatives of Emilio Portes Gil, who became president of Mexico from 1928 to 1930.

De Moya became interested in poetry and literature at during her childhood and adolescence. She wrote many poems during her early life, but later destroyed most of these works, which she saw as mediocre.

In 1888, she married General Horacio Vásquez when she was 26-years old. Vásquez served as President of the Dominican Republic for different terms, including as provisional president from September 1899 to November 1899 and from 1902 to 1903. He later served as the democratically-elected president from 1924 until he was ousted in a 1930 coup led by Rafael Trujillo. Following their wedding, Vásquez and de Moya lived in Tamboril, Dominican Republic, for several years before relocating to the city of Moca. De Moya never had any children, though the El Carib newspaper does mention one adoptive daughter, Edilia Antonia "Toñita" De Moya.

Trina de Moya became a successful poet and writer while living in Moca. Using the pseudonym T. Colombina, de Moya penned a poem called "El estudio" (The Study), which was first published in the Ilustrada No.16 literary magazine on March 15, 1899. She also released her "El Campo" poem using the same T. Colombina moniker. De Moya founded both the Women's Club of Moca and the Women's Club of Santiago in 1906. She headed both organizations and oversaw their cultural and social initiatives. De Noya won an award at the 1915 Juegos Florales de La Vega (Floral Games of La Vega) for her composition, "Patria y La Mujer Dominicana". She won first place with her poem, "Soneto a María", at the feast day coronation of Our Lady of Altagracia in 1922. Other noted works include "Añoranzas", a book of prose.

De Moya had briefly served as first lady in 1899 and again from 1902 to 1903 during her husband's provisional presidencies. She returned to the role from 1924 to 1930 during Horacio Vásquez's third tenure in office. Trina de Moya was the first presidential wife to be called "first lady" by Dominicans. The term "first lady" had originated in the United States in the late 1800s, before gaining popularity in the Dominican Republic during the 1920s. De Moya focused on children right's, culture, education, and humanitarian issues during her time as first lady. She hosted literary events and evenings at the National Palace. She also accompanied President Vásquez on official domestic and international trips. Trina de Moya continued to write and publish while serving as first lady in the 1920s.

First Lady de Moya and Dominican educator Ercilia Pepín were among the first to promote Mother's Day as a new national holiday beginning in 1926. The Vásquez government created the holiday by passing Law Number 370 of 1926, which set Mother's Day as the last Sunday in May. Trina de Moya wrote the Dominican version of Himno a la Madre, a popular Latin American hymn dedicated to mothers. To mark the first official Mother's Day, Himno a la Madre premiered in a choir performance at the Church and Convent of the Dominicans in Santo Domingo on 30 May 1926, with accompanying music composed by Father Manuel de Jesús González.

In 1929, First Lady de Moya published a book of verse poetry titled Patria y Hogar. The poetry book included a prologue written by Dominican poet Fabio Fiallo.

President Horacio Vásquez was overthrown in a 1930 coup led by Rafael Trujillo, the dictator who would rule the Dominican Republic for the next thirty years. Vásquez and de Moya were sent into exile in Puerto Rico, but were allowed to return. He and his wife lived in internal exile at their home at 97 Calle Real in Tamboril until his death. Horacio Vásquez died on March 25, 1936, and was buried at the San Rafael Catholic Church in Tamboril, Dominican Republic.

Trina de Moya died of throat cancer on May 13, 1941, in Santurce, Puerto Rico, where she had travelled for medical treatment. She was buried next to her husband at the San Rafael Catholic Church in Tamboril. In 1989, President Joaquín Balaguer ordered de Moya's remains to be reburied in the National Pantheon of the Dominican Republic in Santo Domingo, but her body was not relocated.

== Legacy ==
Trina de Moya was a devotee of Our Lady of Lourdes. She ordered a painting of Our Lady of Lourdes from France and donated the image to the San Rafael Catholic Church in Tamboril.

The small municipality of Villa Trina in Espaillat Province is named for the poet and former first lady.

Trina de Moya's adopted daughter, Edilia Antonia "Toñita" De Moya, donated her parents' home at 97 Calle Real in Tamboril to the Roman Catholic Archdiocese of Santiago de los Caballeros on 23 May 1989. The Catholic Church, in turn, leased the house to the Horacio Vásquez Foundation for a period of 50 years beginning in 2019. The foundation announced plans to restore the residence and turn it into a museum dedicated to Horacio Vásquez and Trina de Moya.

The Trina de Moya de Vasquez metro station, which opened on Line 2B of the Santo Domingo Metro in August 2018, is named in her honor. Three other new Line 2B metro stations were also named for noted Dominican women: educator Ercilia Pepín and pro-independence activists Concepción Bona and Rosa Duarte.

A park and cultural center in Tamboril were also named for the late poet and first lady.
