= Rosa Smester Marrero =

Dominican feminist, teacher, writer (1874–1945)

Rosa Smester
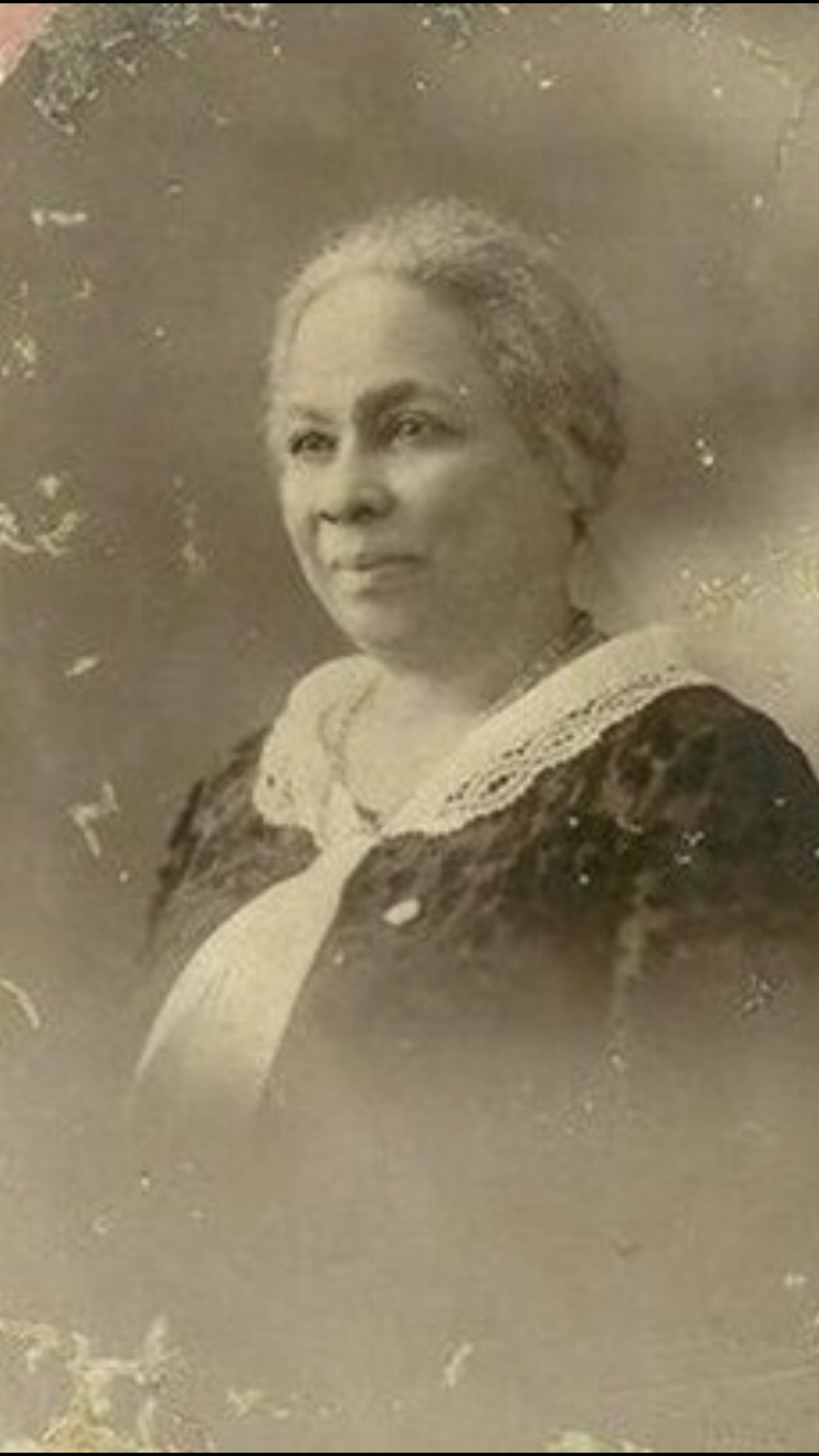
- Born: Rosa Smester Marrero; August 30, 1874; Santiago de los Caballeros, Dominican Republic
- Died: February 15, 1945 (aged 70); Santiago de los Caballeros, Dominican Republic
- Occupations: Teacher; writer
- Known for: Feminist and anti-occupation writings
- Spouse: Juan Grullón

Rosa Smester Marrero (Note: In this Spanish name, the first or paternal surname is Smester and the second or maternal family name is Marrero.) (August 30, 1874 – February 15, 1945) was an educator and writer from the Dominican Republic. She became prominent for her feminist writings and opposition to the United States' occupation of the Dominican Republic. Her career as a teacher rendered her a prominent figure in her home city of Santiago de los Caballeros, where she founded a school and the St Vincent de Paul Hospice.

== Early life ==
Smester was born in Santiago de los Caballeros, Dominican Republic on August 30, 1874. She was the daughter of Paul Emmanuel "Pablo" Smester and Dolores Trinidad "Dada" Marrero. Her father was born in Pointe-à-Pitre in Guadeloupe, and moved from Haiti to Santiago in 1870 to work as a German, English, and Italian translator.

Smester was self-taught and educated at home by her mother. She recalled that her mother taught her the décimas of Juan Antonio Alix and reading from her favorite book, La Historia Sagrada.

== Teaching career ==
In 1897, Smester began teaching French to children at home, which she credited with the discovery of her vocation. By 1902, she had become a syntax, literature, history, and French teacher at the ladies' high school of Santiago. She resigned in 1908 and founded a school in Santiago in 1913.

In 1913, Smester moved to Monte Cristi. Her son, Federico Máximo Smester, was born in Monte Cristi from her marriage to Juan Grullón. As a teacher at the Higher Normal School of Montecristi, a teacher training college, she prepared the first group of Normal Teachers. She directed the Higher School of Ladies of Montecristi.

She was a member of the Amantes de la Luz society, a library and archive.

== Writings ==
Smester's writings are scattered across magazines and journals. She never fulfilled her ambition to write a book, though she published a short story entitled Juan de Dios. Her prose conveys a deep religiosity and Christian conviction.

=== Opposition to the American occupation ===
With the Junta Patriótica de Damas, led by Floripez Mieses, Abigail Mejía, Luisa Ozema Pellerano and Ercilia Pepín, Smester was one of many women who publicly agitated against the United States occupation of the Dominican Republic, which took place between 1916 and 1924. Smester expressed her opposition in the national press, publishing in literary magazines in Santiago. One of Smester's appeals for the removal of American forces read:

To the American journalists who visit us. A simple schoolteacher speaks to you with my heart on my lips. [...] The Dominican people love, above all things, like God, their freedom and their land; that is why our pain in this unfortunate hour is infinite [...] Surprised by the American invasion, we did not prepare for death; because our leaders proclaimed from the outset that we were not at war with the United States and we trusted that that normality would be temporary [...] And it's been over five years of the Via Crucis; we have experienced every pain and humiliation. [...] We have been defenseless and have relied on the strength of patience, justice, and resistance [...] Women have had a prayer on their lips that God help us, and that the gift of justice be granted to the people who oppress us, and the shame of ignominy does not fall upon the country of Washington and Lincoln [...] The Senate Commission comes to clarify the truth of the atrocities we have suffered; it is true that there have been many. [...] There is an unusual fact, a monster against which we will forever clamor: the landing of American troops in our country under the guise of friends and protectors, to strip us of our rights and our holy freedom. Can there be a greater atrocity?

Smester refused to speak English as a form of civil resistance. In May 1920, Smester donated a month's salary to a nationalist cause, writing to Francisco Henríquez y Carvajal, the President of the Nationalist Board, that "whenever necessary, I will give gladly".

=== Feminism ===
In 1926, Smester wrote to Petronila Angélica Gómez, founder of Fémina, the first feminist Dominican journal, that "your magazine is the only genuine feminine, genuinely Dominican, and therefore deserving of the greatest help." In the same year, Smester requested to publish in the magazine, and so recorded her first two contributions to feminist journalism, publishing a further article in 1929. She became one of the magazine's main contributors.

Of the three articles written by Smester for Fémina, two concerned the masculine condition. Smester contributed to a broader feminist position that pacifist strategies disqualify androcentric warmongering, thereby including female voices in war discourses, such that "honoring and glorifying enlightened men is a form of patriotic love". In her 1929 article Así Es, Smester praised Francisco Henríquez y Carvajal's intellectual attributes, which lent him to be an "enlightened" feminist man.

In her Escrito Pro-Feminismo, Smester wrote that feminism has proven to be "essentially constructive", tending "to widen the sphere of action of the woman, to bring into play the activity of her spirit, to develop all her capacity", all without harming "the home and family".

In a conference speech to the cultural society Renovación of Puerto Plata, Smester explained her view that feminism "tries to intensify the femininity in women". By campaigning for women to be as cultured as men, feminism allows women to "be the best collaborator of man to attenuate human miseries and achieve world peace".

Smester praised women "as the greatest spiritual force in the world". Tracing the role of women through the Bible, she situated Eve's act of offering Adam the knowledge of good and evil as "the first act that takes place in paradise [that] marks the eternal and indisputable influence of women". Smester claimed that men would be "born as a turnip" without women and live in a world with neither pleasure nor suffering. Finally, women "are essentially and potently equal to men", and while men have historically dominated humanity's cultural output, a woman's self-denial and "her ability to love and suffer and to shape man in her bosom" brings women "to the same level [as men] if not higher".

In her Elogio a la Madre, Smester wrote that while a woman can be unsurpassable as a teacher or pharmacist, her "highest glory and most certain triumph" is as a mother. In her speech in Puerto Plata, she called motherhood a woman's "true mission, her highest prerogative" and a woman's life devoid of maternal work "useless". For Smester, supporting feminism and emancipation "do nothing against the mysterious instinct of motherhood".

Smester pitied "masculine women", calling the case of tomboys a "natural aberration [that] deserves compassion". She advocated complementary gender roles:

For feminism to be fruitful, women should be very feminine and not domineering, different and equivalent to men, like two feet for the perfect walk.

=== Teaching ===
In Una Educacionista Notable, Smester praised the work of Josefa Goméz, an "enlightened and self-sacrificing" teacher who directed the graduate school at Salcedo, whom Smester credited for increasing the city's level of education. She noted the increasing stature of the profession of teaching, and viewed a teacher's primary duty as instilling a moral education into their students:

The mission of the teacher [is] to put into activity the latent forces of good and reject the depths of the soul, so that what is evil in every human creature is never externalized. And this work is carried out by the poor rural teacher who teaches the boy the rudiments of a morality that he barely understands, to the great philosopher who investigates and teaches the evolution of life. Everyone contributes their grain of sand...Each must serve according to their measure. Give to Caesar what is Caesar's.

== Later life and death ==
Smester chaired a chapter of the charitable Society of Saint Vincent de Paul. At her urging, in 1923, the La Caridad society, which had founded the first hospital in Santiago in 1891, established the 'St Vincent de Paul Branch' under her leadership, for the foundation of a nursing home in Santiago. Smester thus became the first director of the city's St Vincent de Paul Hospice. During this time, she lived in a Victorian house in the Calle del Sol, in front of the Parque Duarte.

From 1927 to 1937, Smester lived in Paris, accompanying her son at the beginning of his career as a doctor at the Sorbonne. She offered private classes while in Paris. Smester lectured at the University of Barcelona and spoke to the newly-founded Lyceum Club (Barcelona), a women's group that called on her help as a cultural figure and influence.

Smester died on February 15, 1945.

== Legacy ==
During her life, the El Regional newspaper of Monte Cristi asked Smester to be honored as the 'Illustrious Daughter' of the city "as a teacher, mother, and fighter". While she was in Paris, an editorial of the Santiago newspaper La Información, which cited Smester as a founding intellectual influence, said she had "one of the most outstanding intellectual capacities" and was "one of the best literary pens the Republic has".

A street in Santo Domingo bears Smester's name. In Santiago, a housing development was named after her. In Monte Cristi, an educational establishment was named the Rosa Smester Basic School.

Smester educated former Dominican President Joaquín Balaguer. Balaguer recalled Smester's great influence on his intellectual formation in his memoirs. Smester also taught Dominican artist Federico Izquierdo, a fellow member and later President of the Amantes de la Luz society, who was greatly pained by her death.

A 1982 poem by Dominican poet Armando Oscar paid tribute to Smester: "[She] went towards the conquest of ethical values [...] On her heart, she carried a crucifix [...] She was a woman, a believer above all else \ And God crowned her with the pain of a son!"

In its 2016 International Women's Day celebrations, the Constitutional Court of the Dominican Republic named Smester among sixty-three "outstanding Dominican women in the struggles for peace and democracy".
