= Ercilia Pepín =

Dominican teacher

Ercilia Pepín Estrella
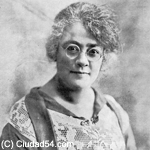
- Born: Ambrosia Ercilia Pepín Estrella; December 7, 1886; Santiago de los Caballeros, Dominican Republic
- Died: June 14, 1939 (age 52); Santiago de los Caballeros, Dominican Republic
- Occupation: Educator

Ercilia Pepín (December 7, 1886 – June 14, 1939) was a teacher, feminist, and equal rights activist in the Dominican Republic. She dedicated herself to the welfare and preservation of the Dominican nation through education.

== Early life ==
Ambrosia Ercilia Pepín Estrella was born on December 7, 1886, in the city of Santiago de los Caballeros. She was the daughter of Don Jose Pepín and Edelmira Estrella. Through her father, she was related to the political and military figure Pedro "Perico" Pepín, right hand man of President Ulises Heureaux.

In 1891, when Pepín was five years old, her mother died and her father's involvement in the Dominican political struggles of the late 19th century between conservatives and liberals led her to live with her grandmother Carlota Alvarez in the village of Marilópez, on the outskirts of San- tiago. However, her grandmother's dire financial situation led to Pepín moving to live with Dolores Báez in the Nibaje neighbourhood of Santiago, where she lived for the rest of her life. She began her formal studies at the age of eight, in 1894, when she entered the first year of basic education. Her family was prominent in the political circles of the country, which led to Pepín received basic lessons in social studies, math, French, physics and other disciplines. At the age of 10, Pepín was accepted into the Practical Courses at the Normal School for training teachers. Enrollment was not supposed to be until the age of 12, but she finished a programme designed for six years in only four years.

== Career ==
In 1900, at the young age of 14, Pepín formally began her career as a teacher in a school for girls in the Santiago neighbourhood of Nibaje. In 1906 she was appointed headmistress of the Girls' School in the Marilope neighbourhood. In 1908 she assumed the post of teacher in the areas of Mathematics, Physical and Natural Sciences in the College for Women, replacing her teacher Cucurullo Salvador. He was of Italian origin, and had settled in Santiago in 1896. Salvador had taught her Italian and French, and encouraged her teaching skills.

Pepín adopted the system taught by the educator Eugenio María de Hostos, which at that time was beginning to spread throughout the country. With this method she could better organise the lessons and apply disciplinary rules and standards of behaviour. Among the measures introduced were the use of school uniform for the first time in Dominican Republic and the respectful treatment between teachers and students, including the rule of addressing students with the title "señoritas", which was imposed both on the students themselves and on the teachers.

Pepín urged respect for national symbols, the flag and coat of arms; she also prompted some musicians to compose and sing hymns in honor of these symbols. She also added as part of the method de Hostos, a Primary School Manual Arts or Crafts, a Gymnasium and a school choir, and also introduced subjects such as drawing and cartography. Most of these measures were criticized at first by sectors of society, who did not understand or accept the then-innovative measures of a teacher who was only 25 years old.

== Activism ==
Pepín was one of the first Dominican woman to push the feminist movements in the country, raising her voice in defense of equal rights throughout country. She was also patriotic and a nationalist, campaigning to promote awareness of the teaching of moral and civic values.

In August 1913, with honors, Pepín received the title of Maestra Normal, at her home town. She then began a campaign to Congress, with the aim of establishing a Professional Institute of Higher Education in Santiago. In 1915, by resolution of Congress, she began teaching at the institute in which Mathematics, Law, Medicine, Pharmacy and Dentistry were taught. Pepín became a medical student there but soon after the United States military occupation of the Dominican Republic (1916–1924) 1916, the Institute had to close its doors.

Pepín opposed the U.S. invasion, and gave several speeches to inform the people of what was happening in the country; she spoke of love for Duarte's homeland, love for the land of your birth. She demanded that Americans sing the National Anthem and fly the Dominican flag, extending these customs to all citizens, regardless of sex or age.

Pepín was one of the founders and leaders of the Junta Patriótica de Damas, (Patriotic League of Ladies) alongside other feminist writers, Floripez Mieses, Abigail Mejía, Luisa Ozema Pellerano, created on March 15, 1920. Rosa Smester Marrero was a prominent member of the organisation.

Pepín drafted a letter protesting the occupation of the Dominican Republic which was signed by hundreds of women before being sent to the U.S. Senate Committee studying the situation on the island.

When Pépin was invited by the occupying U.S. military government to represent the Dominican Republic at the National American Woman’s Suffrage Association in the United States in 1921, she refused to attend stating “¿Cómo voy a ir a hablar de mi país en el país que tiene preso a mi país?”. ("How can I go and talk about my country in the country that has my country imprisoned?").

In 1928 Pepín founded Acción Cultural Feminista with Delia Weber and Abigail Mejia to promote education as a tool of liberation for all women. Women in Dominican Republic at the time had higher levels of illiteracy than men.

Members of the Junta Patriótica de Damas, alongside some of Pepín’s students at the Colegio de Señoritas “México” embroidered a replica of the Nicaraguan flag and sent it to Augusto César Sandino, on May 15, 1928, accompanied by a letter from Pepín explaining their support of his campaign against the United States occupation of Nicaragua that lasted from 1912 to 1933.

When the intervening troops withdrew on 24 July 1924, she led the ceremony organised by country's authorities for the raising of the national flag at the Fortress of San Luis. The tricolour ensign used in the fortress was made by the young students of her college. One hundred young women knelt to see the Stars and Stripes flag lowered and the flag of the Dominican Republic since 27 February 1844 raised in its stead.

== Later years ==
In 1925 she was declared Hija Benemérita de Santiago (a Meritorious Daughter) by the City of Santiago. In 1926, she travelled to America and Europe.

In 1930, the head of the Army, Rafael Leonidas Trujillo maneuvered his way to power and remained in control as dictator until his assassination in 1961. Trujillo initially had great admiration and respect for Pepín. In 1932, when Professor Andrés Perezo was ambushed and killed by government assassins, she placed a flag that Trujillo had given her at half-mast as a sign of mourning. Trujillo reacted badly and ordered her dismissal as principal of the Escuela Mexico. Pepín continued to teach in a private school, while she was gravely ill with a kidney disease. Trujillo took care of the expenses of her illness.

Ercilia Pepín died on June 14, 1939. Today she is remembered as one of the outstanding women in the history of the in Dominican Republic.

== Commemoration ==
A metro station in Santo Domingo is named after her on Line 2, opened on 9 August 2018. Other stations on the line commemorate notable people from the Dominican republic including Eduardo Brito, Concepción Bona, Rosa Duarte and Trina de Moya de Vasquez. In the San Carlos area of La Romana, a street bears her name.

The Ercilia Pepín Parent Leadership Institute at New York's Children’s Aid community school in Washington Heights has offered adult high school graduation equivalent classes in English and Spanish for over twenty years.
