= Hato del Yaque =

District in Santiago, Dominican Republic

Coordinates: 19°28′N 70°46′W

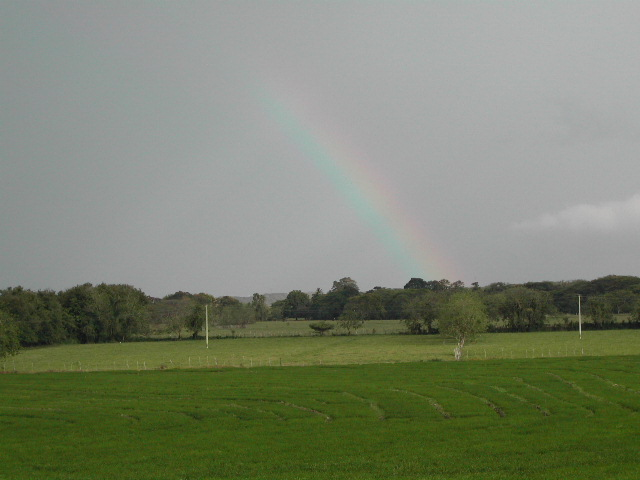
This picture of a rainbow was taken at a rice field in the village of El muro, Hato del yaque

Hato del Yaque is a municipal district in the province of Santiago, Dominican Republic. Its urban centre is located 10 km west of the city of Santiago de los caballeros.

== History ==
In 1979 Hurricane David destroyed many homes alongside the river in the city of Santiago. Most of those people were relocated in what is now the town of Hato del Yaque.

Hato del yaque had a population of 25,816 people in 2002. The population of its urban center in 2002 was 18,354 people.

In 2024, President Luis Abinader and Housing Minister Carlos Bonilla delivered 300 new apartments to local families as part of the government's Mi Vivienda Hato del Yaque plan. With a planned total of 1,200 apartments, the housing development was built to help families living in vulnerable conditions on the Gurabo river.

== Subdivisions ==
The municipal district of Hato del Yaque is subdivided into four secciones or sectors, which are subdivided into barrios (neighborhoods). The sectors of Hato del Yaque are listed below.

- Hato del Yaque
- Hato del Yaque Arriba
- Aciba
- Guayacanal

== Neighborhoods ==
The town of Hato del Yaque is subdivided into the following neighborhoods.

- Monseñor Eliseo Pérez Sánchez
- Villa Progreso
- Urb. Dr. Grullón
- La Mina
- Hermanas Mirabal
- El Tamarindo
- San Antonio
- La Paz
- Las Colinas
- Los Jiménez
- El Portón
- Los Letreros
- El Porton
- La Rinconada
- Barrio Balaguer
- Tres Pasitos
- Villa Fatima
- Los Guandules
- Villa Bao
- Brisas del Yaque
- Cerros del Yaque
- Praderas del Yaque
