= Santiago de los Caballeros =

City in Santiago, Dominican Republic

- City
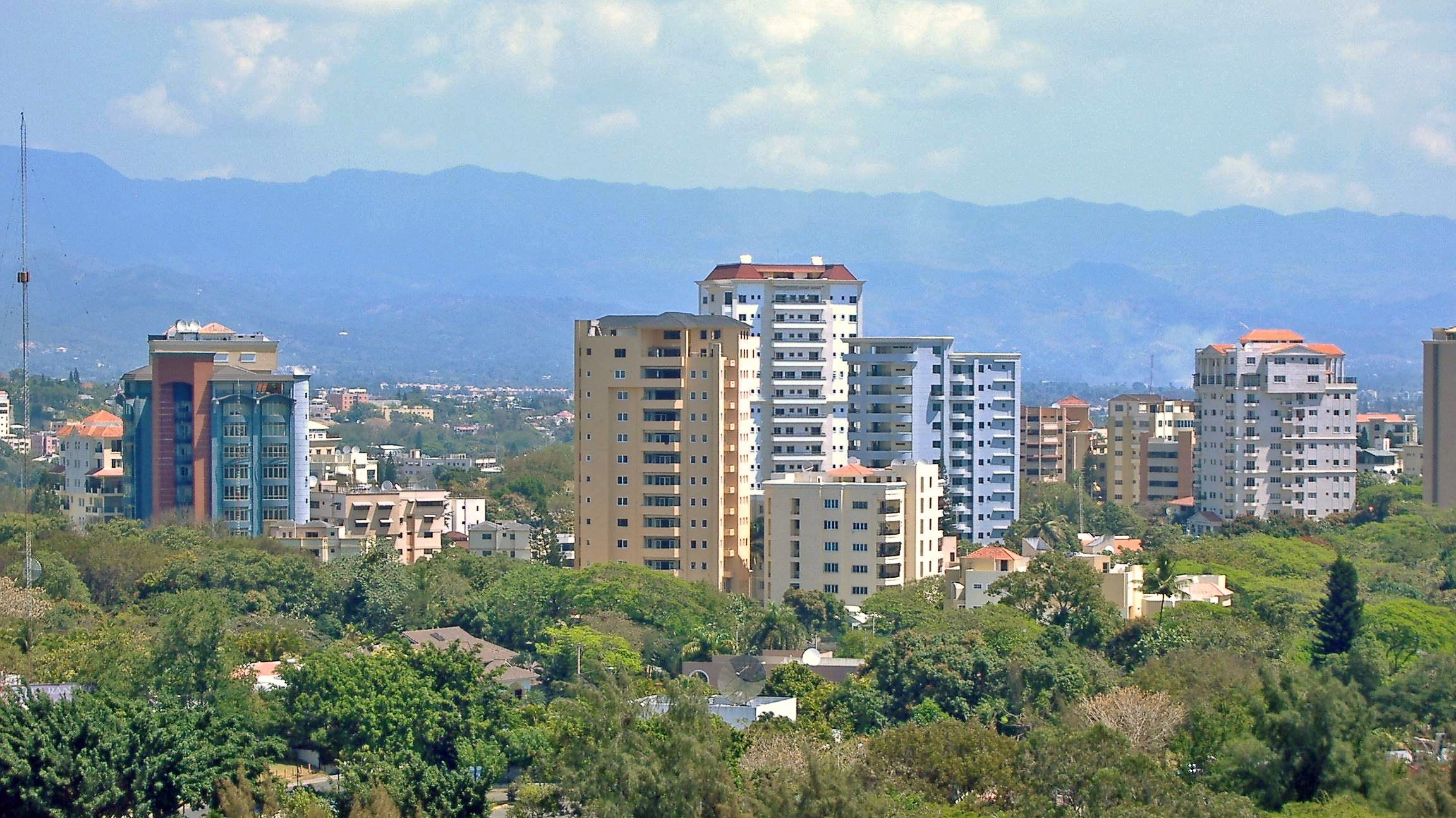
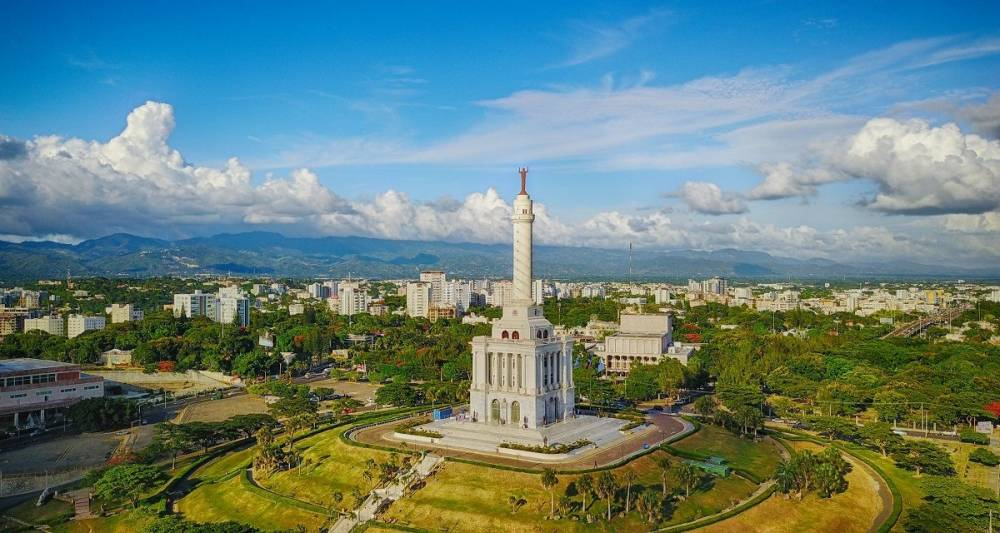
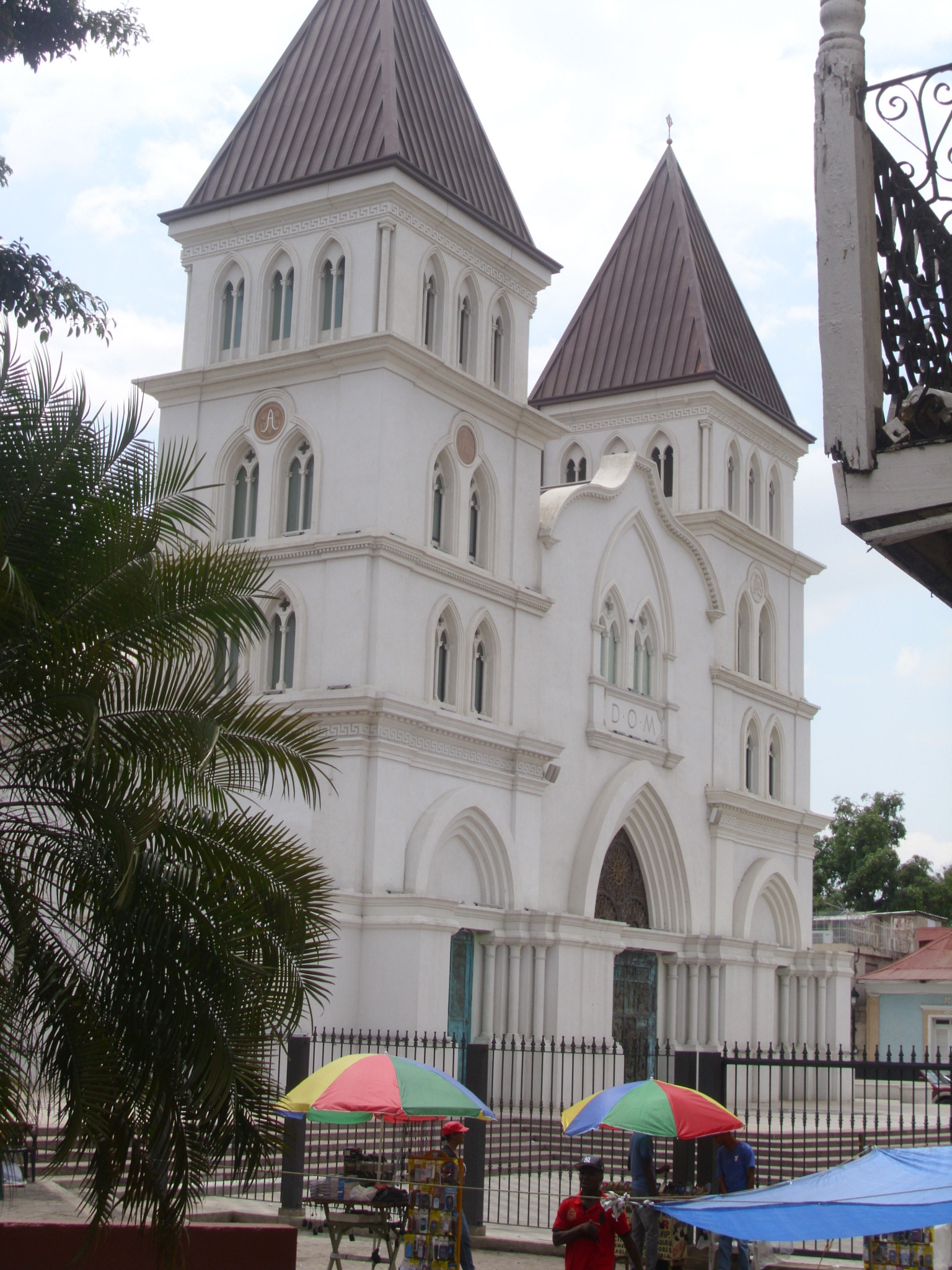
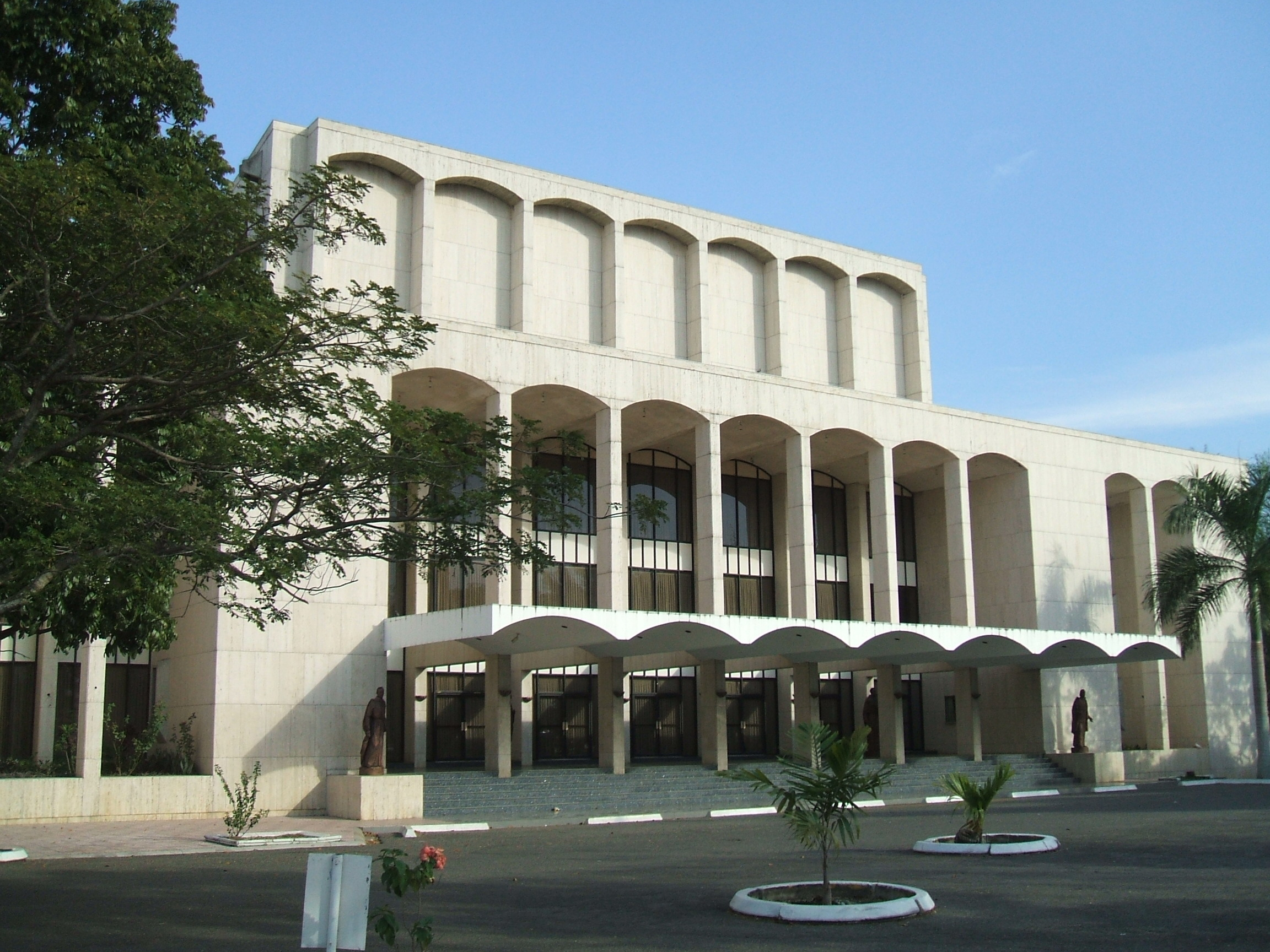
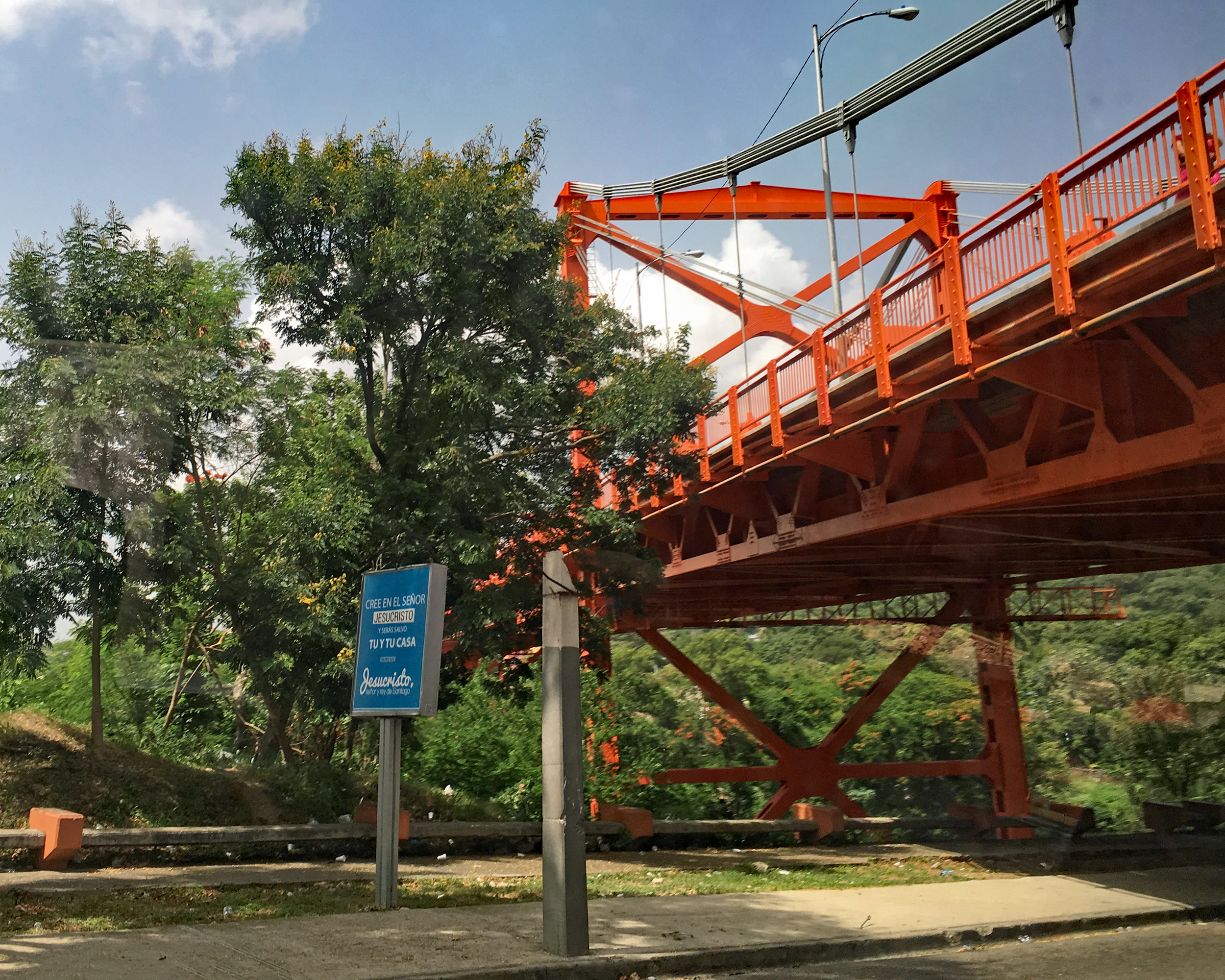
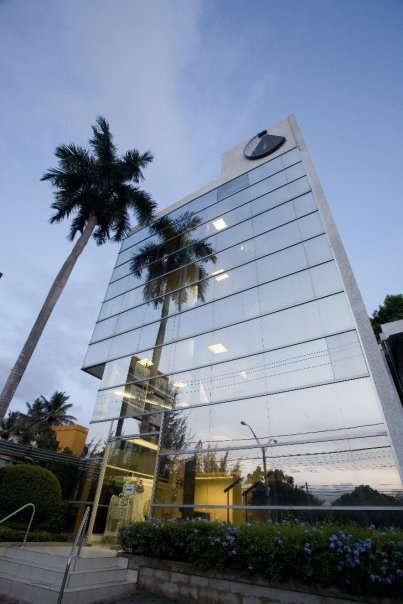

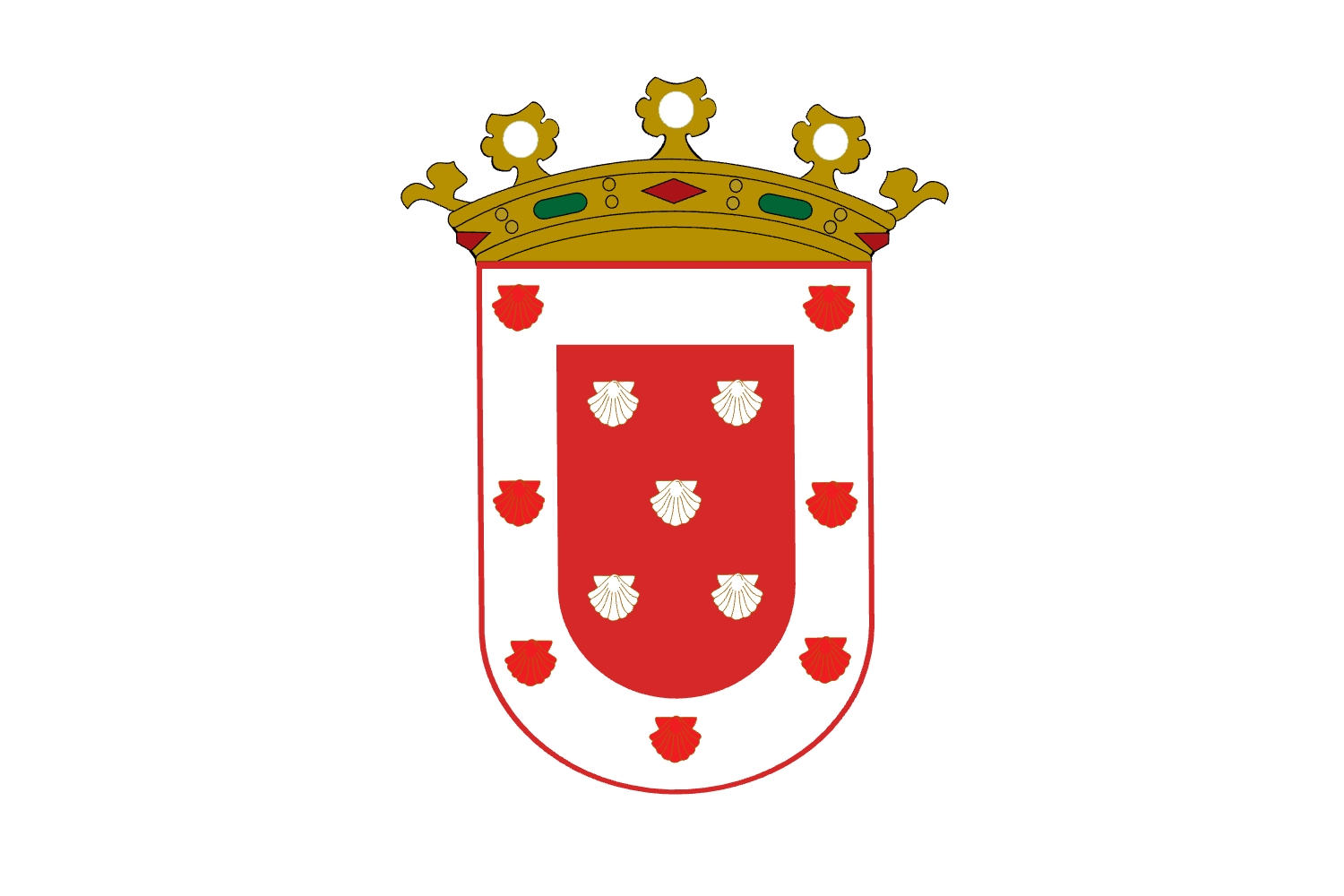
- Flag Coat of arms
- Nickname: Ciudad Corazón
- Mottoes: "La Ciudad Corazón", "Primer Santiago de América" (in Spanish) ("The Heartland City", "First Santiago of the Americas")
- Location within the Dominican Republic Location within the Caribbean
- Coordinates: 19°27′26″N 70°41′20″W
- Country: Dominican Republic
- Province: Santiago
- Founded: 1495

Government
  - Mayor: Ulises Rodriguez

Area
  - Total: 524.01 km^{2} (202.32 sq mi)
- Elevation: 175 m (574 ft)

Population (2022 census)
  - Total: 771,748
  - Rank: 2nd
  - Density: 1,472.8/km^{2} (3,814.5/sq mi)
  - Metro: 1,261,852
  - Demonym: Spanish: Santiaguero; Santiagueño

GDP (PPP, constant 2015 values)
  - Year: 2023
  - Total: $16.0 billion
  - Per capita: $23,200
- Time zone: UTC-4 (Atlantic Standard Time)
- Postal code: 51000
- Climate: Am
- Municipal districts: 5
- Website: ayuntamientosantiago.gob.do

Santiago de los Caballeros ("Saint James of the Knights"), often shortened to Santiago, is the second-largest city in the Dominican Republic and the fourth-largest city in the Caribbean by population. It is the capital of Santiago Province and the largest major metropolis in the Cibao region of the country. Santiago is the largest Caribbean city that is not a capital city, and the largest non-coastal metropolis in the Caribbean islands. It is approximately 155 km (96 mi) northwest of the capital, Santo Domingo, with an average altitude of 178 m (584 ft). The city has a population of 771,748 inhabitants (2022). Santiago's metropolitan area population composed of the municipalities of Santiago-Licey Al Medio-Baitoa-Tamboril-Puñal-Villa González is 1,261,852 as of 2022, making it the Dominican Republic's second-largest.

Founded in 1495 during the first wave of European settlement in the New World, the city is the "first Santiago of the Americas". Today it is one of the Dominican Republic's cultural, political, industrial and financial centers. Due to its location in the fertile Cibao Valley, it has a robust agricultural sector and is a leading exporter of rum, textiles, and cigars. Santiago is known as "La Ciudad Corazón" (the "Heartland City").

Santiago de los Caballeros was an important strategic city in the Dominican War of Independence. The city's name, Saint James of the Knights, refers to the Hidalgos de la Isabela, a group of knights who came from La Isabela city to stay in Santiago. Sometimes, the city is called Santiago de los 30 Caballeros (English: Saint James of the 30 Knights).

== History ==
The name of the city (Saint James of the Knights) refers to the Hidalgos de la Isabela, a group of knights who had come from La Isabela to settle in Santiago. The colony was originally located in San Francisco de Jacagua (now a suburb of the city), founded in 1495. Still, when an earthquake destroyed it, it was moved to its current location in 1506. In granting in 1508 the Royal Privilege of Concession de Armas to the Villa de Santiago of Hispaniola, the heraldic emblem that was included in his shield was venerated. The royal decree was signed by King Ferdinand II of Aragon.

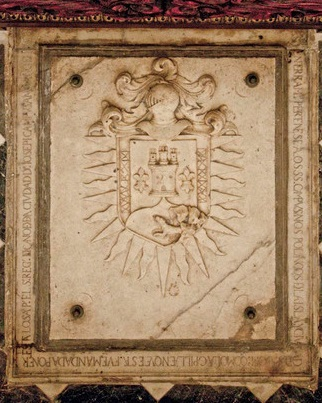
Campuzano Polanco Coat of Arms.

The city was devastated by another earthquake on December 2, 1562. The survivors settled on land belonging to Petronila Jáquez of Minaya, adjacent to the Yaque del Norte, which is the current location of the city's river. The brief French during the Peace of Basel (which yielded the Spanish part of the island to France in 1795) left its mark on Santiago. Santiago was returned to Spain under the Peace of Paris of 1814. During the 19th Century, Santiago began its modern urban planning. European neoclassicism is represented at the Palace Hall, built between 1892 and 1895, by a Belgian architect named Louis Bogaert. The late 1800s saw a peak of architecture in the city. Numerous residences were built in European styles, and make up the central core of Santiago.

== Geography ==
Santiago de los Caballeros is located on a hilly terrain in the middle of the Cibao Valley in the Central Region of the Dominican Republic, one of the most fertile lands found in the island. The Yaque del Norte River passes by Santiago which is in between the Cordillera Central and the Cordillera Septentrional, two of the three major mountain ranges on the island of Hispaniola, forming the Cibao Valley.

=== Climate ===
Santiago features a tropical savanna climate (Aw) under the Köppen climate classification. The average temperature varies little in the city, because the tropical trade winds help mitigate the heat and humidity throughout the year. December and January are the coolest months and July and August are the warmest. Santiago and most of the country have a tropical climate, which, when coupled with the city's altitude, 183 meters above sea level, causes cloudy conditions to persist through much of the year. While the entire country is susceptible to Atlantic hurricanes, Santiago and its environs are more sheltered than other parts of the country from their effects because of its location in the Cibao Valley.

Climate data for Santiago de los Caballeros (1991–2020)
Month	Jan	Feb	Mar	Apr	May	Jun	Jul	Aug	Sep	Oct	Nov	Dec	Year
Mean daily maximum °C (°F)	28.9 (84.0)	29.7 (85.5)	30.7 (87.3)	31.3 (88.3)	31.9 (89.4)	33.1 (91.6)	33.2 (91.8)	33.5 (92.3)	33.3 (91.9)	32.6 (90.7)	30.6 (87.1)	29.3 (84.7)	31.5 (88.7)
Daily mean °C (°F)	23.8 (74.8)	24.4 (75.9)	25.1 (77.2)	26.0 (78.8)	26.9 (80.4)	27.9 (82.2)	28.1 (82.6)	28.2 (82.8)	27.9 (82.2)	27.3 (81.1)	25.7 (78.3)	24.3 (75.7)	26.3 (79.3)
Mean daily minimum °C (°F)	18.8 (65.8)	19.1 (66.4)	19.5 (67.1)	20.7 (69.3)	21.8 (71.2)	22.8 (73.0)	22.9 (73.2)	22.9 (73.2)	22.4 (72.3)	22.0 (71.6)	20.7 (69.3)	19.3 (66.7)	21.1 (70.0)
Average precipitation mm (inches)	69.4 (2.73)	42.1 (1.66)	73.5 (2.89)	121.2 (4.77)	140.4 (5.53)	67.4 (2.65)	73.4 (2.89)	76.8 (3.02)	94.7 (3.73)	118.2 (4.65)	107.7 (4.24)	81.4 (3.20)	1,066.1 (41.97)
Source: NOAA

Climate data for Santiago de los Caballeros (1971–2000)
Month	Jan	Feb	Mar	Apr	May	Jun	Jul	Aug	Sep	Oct	Nov	Dec	Year
Record high °C (°F)	34.4 (93.9)	34.7 (94.5)	35.8 (96.4)	36.0 (96.8)	36.0 (96.8)	36.7 (98.1)	36.6 (97.9)	38.2 (100.8)	37.6 (99.7)	36.5 (97.7)	39.8 (103.6)	34.7 (94.5)	39.8 (103.6)
Mean daily maximum °C (°F)	28.9 (84.0)	29.4 (84.9)	30.4 (86.7)	31.1 (88.0)	31.9 (89.4)	32.9 (91.2)	33.1 (91.6)	33.2 (91.8)	33.1 (91.6)	32.4 (90.3)	30.5 (86.9)	28.9 (84.0)	31.3 (88.4)
Daily mean °C (°F)	23.7 (74.7)	24.0 (75.2)	24.8 (76.6)	25.6 (78.1)	26.6 (79.9)	27.6 (81.7)	27.8 (82.0)	27.8 (82.0)	27.6 (81.7)	27.0 (80.6)	25.5 (77.9)	23.9 (75.0)	26.0 (78.8)
Mean daily minimum °C (°F)	18.5 (65.3)	18.7 (65.7)	19.3 (66.7)	20.2 (68.4)	21.4 (70.5)	22.4 (72.3)	22.4 (72.3)	22.4 (72.3)	22.0 (71.6)	21.6 (70.9)	20.5 (68.9)	19.0 (66.2)	20.7 (69.3)
Record low °C (°F)	11.2 (52.2)	12.2 (54.0)	12.5 (54.5)	12.7 (54.9)	16.3 (61.3)	18.5 (65.3)	17.0 (62.6)	17.6 (63.7)	18.6 (65.5)	17.5 (63.5)	15.0 (59.0)	12.1 (53.8)	11.2 (52.2)
Average rainfall mm (inches)	55.0 (2.17)	42.3 (1.67)	61.9 (2.44)	109.3 (4.30)	133.1 (5.24)	63.7 (2.51)	48.1 (1.89)	71.9 (2.83)	85.3 (3.36)	112.4 (4.43)	94.4 (3.72)	68.2 (2.69)	945.6 (37.25)
Average rainy days (≥ 1.0 mm)	8.0	6.5	6.0	8.0	9.6	5.3	6.8	7.4	7.9	9.3	9.6	9.6	94
Average relative humidity (%)	77.2	75.1	71.6	71.5	73.5	71.0	70.5	71.5	73.4	75.4	78.4	78.5	74.0
Mean monthly sunshine hours	224.1	202.2	245.2	236.9	242.7	245.9	255.1	262.8	234.5	235.4	212.2	205.1	2,802.1
Source: ONAMET

Climate data for Santiago de los Caballeros (1961-1990)
Month	Jan	Feb	Mar	Apr	May	Jun	Jul	Aug	Sep	Oct	Nov	Dec	Year
Record high °C (°F)	34.4 (93.9)	34.4 (93.9)	37.2 (99.0)	38.4 (101.1)	36.2 (97.2)	37.4 (99.3)	36.2 (97.2)	39.0 (102.2)	41.0 (105.8)	37.0 (98.6)	36.8 (98.2)	34.7 (94.5)	41.0 (105.8)
Mean daily maximum °C (°F)	28.8 (83.8)	29.4 (84.9)	30.4 (86.7)	31.2 (88.2)	31.8 (89.2)	32.9 (91.2)	33.0 (91.4)	33.2 (91.8)	33.3 (91.9)	32.4 (90.3)	30.3 (86.5)	28.7 (83.7)	31.3 (88.3)
Daily mean °C (°F)	23.5 (74.3)	23.8 (74.8)	24.7 (76.5)	25.5 (77.9)	26.5 (79.7)	27.4 (81.3)	27.5 (81.5)	27.7 (81.9)	27.6 (81.7)	26.9 (80.4)	25.2 (77.4)	23.7 (74.7)	25.8 (78.4)
Mean daily minimum °C (°F)	18.2 (64.8)	18.4 (65.1)	19.0 (66.2)	19.9 (67.8)	21.2 (70.2)	22.1 (71.8)	22.2 (72.0)	22.2 (72.0)	21.9 (71.4)	21.5 (70.7)	20.2 (68.4)	18.7 (65.7)	20.5 (68.9)
Record low °C (°F)	11.2 (52.2)	12.2 (54.0)	12.0 (53.6)	12.7 (54.9)	16.3 (61.3)	18.5 (65.3)	17.0 (62.6)	17.6 (63.7)	18.6 (65.5)	17.5 (63.5)	15.0 (59.0)	12.0 (53.6)	11.2 (52.2)
Average rainfall mm (inches)	49.8 (1.96)	47.7 (1.88)	59.2 (2.33)	104.4 (4.11)	151.2 (5.95)	67.6 (2.66)	56.4 (2.22)	73.1 (2.88)	96.8 (3.81)	109.7 (4.32)	125.6 (4.94)	80.2 (3.16)	1,021.7 (40.22)
Average rainy days (≥ 1.0 mm)	7.4	6.2	5.7	7.9	10.5	5.6	7.2	8.0	8.1	8.7	10.7	9.8	95.8
Average relative humidity (%)	77.8	75.9	72.6	72.5	74.8	72.4	71.9	72.6	74.0	76.1	79.1	79.6	74.9
Mean monthly sunshine hours	224	202	245	237	243	246	255	263	235	235	212	205	2,802
Source 1: NOAA, Acqweather (sun)
Source 2: Temperature Extreme Records

== Economy ==
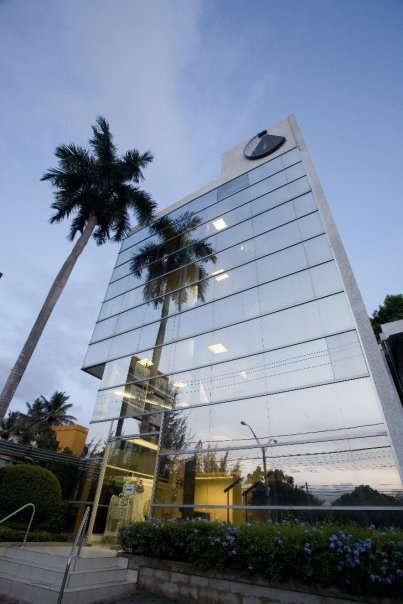
La Trinitaria area in Santiago Dominican Republic.

Santiago de los Caballeros is considered the capital of the Cibao region, which produces 33% of the GDP, for a total of US$36,025 million in 2022, exceeding the total of El Salvador. Likewise, it had a Foreign Direct Investment (FDI) of US$978 million, equivalent to the 16th economy in receiving foreign investment in Latin America and the Caribbean, surpassing Ecuador.

Santiago's economy is mainly based by the commercialization and industrialization of its products and finished goods, production of goods in the free zones, and by commerce. The city has headquarters and branches of all the main stores, supermarkets, restaurants and financial entities of the country. The city also has several shopping centers and multinational companies.

Since it is the second-largest city in the Dominican Republic, it currently produces the second highest percentage of the nation's GDP, while also having one of the highest incomes per capita, and a large middle-class population. Telecommunications, such as; wireless phones, cable service, internet service and other services are important for the local economy. Tourism, to a lesser extent, also accounts for a portion of the city's economy.

Santiago, like most cities and towns in the Cibao valley, has historically benefited from the fertile lands of this region. This makes Santiago de los Caballeros an important area for farming and livestock. Santiago's industrial sector is also one of the most dynamic in the country. It has the concentration of 15% of domestic industries. This means 308 manufacturing companies, which in 2004 employed more than 14,000 people or 12% of the labor of Dominican manufacturing work. The products range from cigars, coffee, and alcoholic beverages, to concrete, plywood and sheet products.

The Mercado Modelo on Calle del Sol is a shopping center where there are various stores of handicrafts and native articles made by hand.

=== Growth and development ===
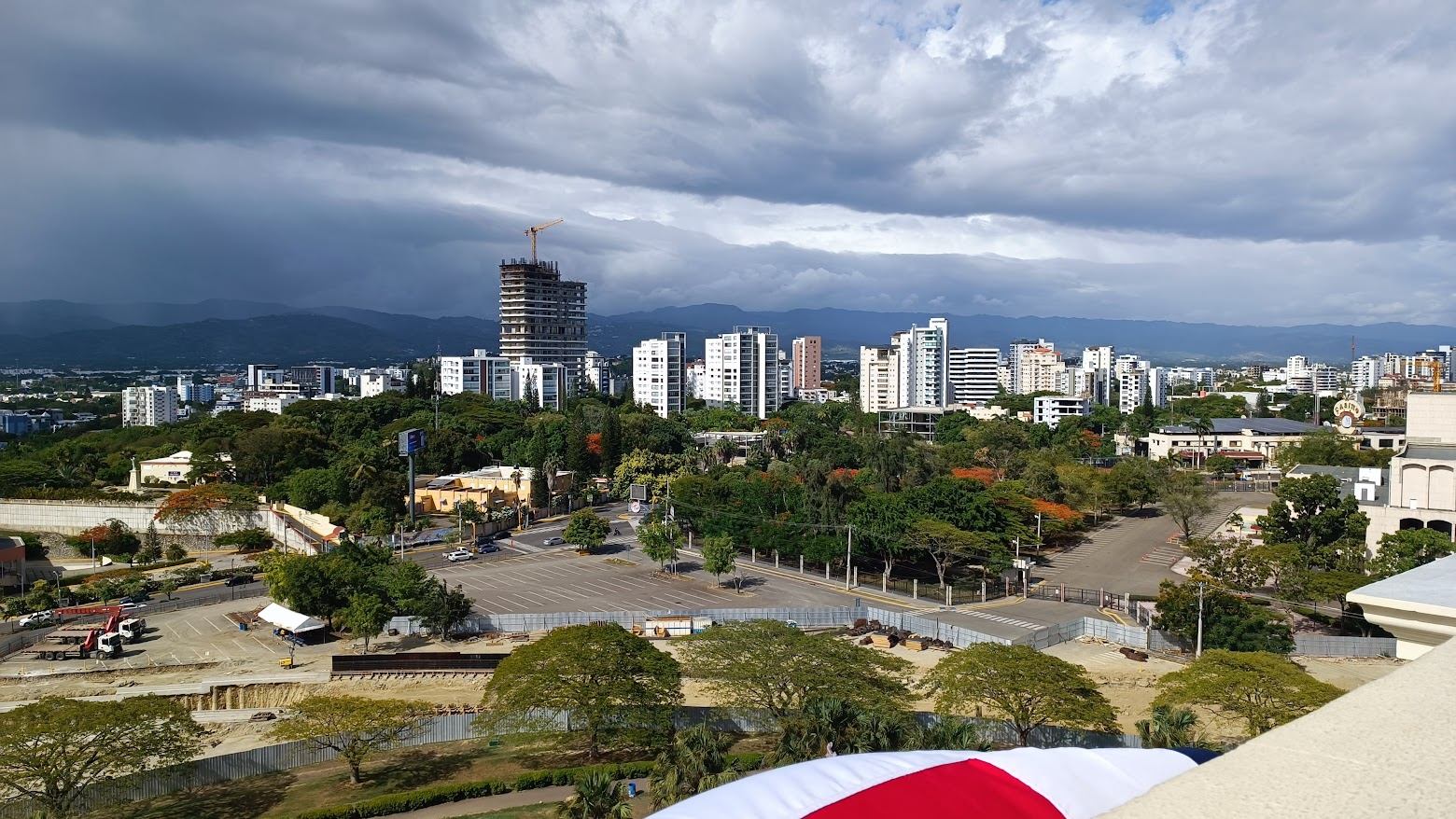
Panoramic view of Santiago.

Santiago has recently experienced an era of rapid growth and development. It has become a city of great importance for the nation and the region's development. The population of Santiago was about 771,748 inhabitants as of 2022, making it the second most populous city in the Dominican Republic and one of the largest in the Caribbean (behind Santo Domingo, Havana, and Port-au-Prince), as well as the largest city that isn't a capital (although it once was).

The role of Santiago as a regional development hub and that of La Vega, Moca, San Francisco de Macorís and Puerto Plata as “hinge” cities for interregional articulation, give it a unique character in the national territory. While the first articulates regional, national and international processes that generate agro-productive wealth and services, the other three do so with their immediate regions: La Vega with the center of the national territory, San Francisco de Macorís with its immediate surroundings in the east and south, and Moca and Puerto Plata with their northern surroundings. This dynamic of territorial cohesion is completed with an articulated network of three tertiary centers (Tamboril, Navarrete and Salcedo) and 8 local centers that articulate with the immediate rural environment.

Economically, Santiago de los Caballeros is the axis of advancement of the northern and central region of the country and has a particular influence on the national economy. The economy of the Santiago municipality is supported mainly by the production, industrialization and commercialization of agricultural products, commerce, banking services, call centers, health services, education, among others. The industrial free zone of the Santiago municipality houses 23% of the country's companies and generates 24% of exports36, and a total of 155 companies operate in these 15 parks, that is, 30% of the national total of companies under this regime. The first generator of direct employment is the commerce and hotel sector, followed by the industrial sector, which represents 29.2% and 18.3% of the employed population, respectively; However, the percentage of the employed population was estimated for 2010 at 41.4% of the total for the Santiago municipality, while informal employment for 2015 was around 54.4% of the employed population according to data collected in the ICES study (2015). As of 2025, the city has 771,748 inhabitants with a visitor population of more than 250,000 per day.

== Demographics ==
Historical population
Year	Pop.	±%
1960	85,640	—
1970	155,240	+81.3%
1981	260,361	+67.7%
1988	306,031	+17.5%
1993	363,106	+18.7%
2002	507,418	+39.7%
2007	622,101	+22.6%
2010	691,262	+11.1%
2022	771,748	+11.6%

=== Population Growth and Development ===
Santiago de Los Caballeros had experienced important demographic growth since the 1960s decade. During the period of 1960–70 the population growth from 85,640 to 155,240 inhabitants with an annual growth rate of 6.51%. During the intercensal period 1970–1981 the population annual growth rate was of 4.43%, increasing from 155,240 to 260,361. During the inter-census period of 1981–1993 the population of the city increased on an annual rate of 2.86% and registered a total increase of 102,745 inhabitants. The population jumped from 260,361 to 363,106 inhabitants.

Despite the population continuing to grow, in the decades after the 1960s, the growth rate gradually decreased. This slowdown may have been related to the decrease in the attraction force of Santiago as a regional nucleus and the loss of local dynamism, generating changes in population distribution. In the decade from 1993 to 2002 the annual growth rate was 3.61%, which constituted an increase of 141,955 more people, and reached a population of 507,418 inhabitants in 2002 while the urban area was 602,701 inhabitants. This growth was related to the attraction generated by the job offer in the free zone sector and the university academic offer. According to the Dominican Republic's 2003–2007 National Statistics Office (ONE) report, the estimated population of the city was 622,101 as of 2007.

In the period 1960–1969 the city grew by 6 km^{2}, that is, it covered an area of approximately 9 km^{2}. In 1979 the city of Santiago de los Caballeros already had an urbanized area of 25 km^{2}, the result of rural-urban migration that extended the city with the creation of new peripheral neighborhoods. Later, with the use of immigrant labor from rural areas and neighboring towns that attracted the opening of the industrial free zone in the 80s, there was significant urban growth in the northwest area of the city, as well as real estate investment towards the north-northeast and east, extending to 28 km^{2}, three times more than in 1970.

The 90s defined a new profile of the city, registering a greater growth of high-rise buildings for residential use. By 1998, it was estimated that the city had reached an urbanized area of 40 km^{2}. And by 2009, an urban area of approximately 90 km^{2} (55% of the municipality), extending its north–south axis approximately 10 kilometers and its east–west axis 11 kilometers. From 1960 to 2009, Santiago has multiplied its urban population by eight and has expanded its urbanized territory 30 times, leaving only 72 km^{2} available for expansion of the 162 km^{2} of the municipality.

Analyzing the growth trend and the role that Santiago has played in the regional configuration of the Cibao, it is understood that beyond the political-administrative borders, Santiago has a functional relationship with settlements that directly influence it, located within a radius of 50 kilometers, which includes all the municipalities and municipal districts of its province, in addition to Puerto Plata, Mao, La Vega and Moca. Its indirect influence reaches distant localities such as Dajabón, in the Northwest Line (150 kilometers), even to Cap Haitien, the main urban center of the northern part of the Republic of Haiti. As of 2002, The area of influence of the municipality, at an economic level, is exercised not only with the municipalities that make up the province but with the municipalities of Moca, Mao, Esperanza, La Vega, Puerta Plata, Imbert and Sosua. The basic production of the surrounding municipalities is tobacco planting and production, poultry activities and free trade zones.

In the last 20 years, its urban area has expanded by 35% (14.74 km2) and has been consolidated by 65% (27.98 km2), totaling 42.72 km2, which corresponds to 47% of the total area of the study of the city of Santiago. To have a reference of the size to which this expansion-consolidation refers, this area would be 47 times larger than the Colonial City of Santo Domingo or approximately half the size of the National District. The expansion has been carried out predominantly in the periphery, especially in western Santiago, where 31% (4.52 km2) of the expansion is located. On the other hand, the predominant consolidation has been combined in the central, eastern and southeastern areas of the city, especially in the urban area, with 46% (12.89 km2). Although urban expansion has been proportionally lower than consolidation in the study area, it does not include the expansion observed in the municipalities of Tamboril, Licey al Medio and Puñal, which are part of the metropolitan area of Santiago de los Caballeros. These three municipalities have totaled an additional expansion of 12 km2.

=== 2010 Population Census ===
As of 2010 Dominican Republic population census, the city of Santiago de los Caballeros had 691,262 inhabitants, Of these, a total of 550,753 live in the urban area of the municipality, while some 41,232 live in the rural area, which indicates that there is a minimal incidence of populations established in peri-urban and rural areas (6.96% of the total population) while 691,262 inhabitants on the urban area, Distributed over an area of 480.7 km^{2}, which reflects a population density of 1,438 inhabitants per km^{2}. However, unlike the 2002 census, the districts of Puñal and Sabana Iglesias were excluded of the municipal and urban area population.

The population of Santiago de los Caballeros is predominantly young, with 64.28% being made up of people under 34 years of age. Of this total, 31.42% is made up of people between 18 and 34 years of age. The population is predominantly female (51.2%), resulting in a masculinity index of 0.95. In 2010, the population was distributed in 175,318 households, with an average of 3.38 inhabitants per household. According to the city hall 2016's strategic plan, Santiago de los Caballeros had 852,361 metropolitan area population, which is 88.5% population of the providence and 9% of the country's population. In terms of occupied surface area, the metropolitan area occupies 733 km^{2}, which represents 34% of the province and 2% of the country.

==== Districts ====
The city has the following subdivisions:

Division	Status	Area in km^{2}	Population (2010)	Population Density
Hato del Yaque	District	37.96	29,524	776.95
La Canela	District	93.49	17,067	182.73
Pedro García	District	52.51	4,006	76.16
San Francisco de Jacagua	District	82.74	36,902	448.38
Santiago	Municipal Core	148.3	591,985	3.587.79
Baitoa	District	42.9	11,778	274.55
Total	City		691,262	1,458.05

=== 2022 Census ===
As of 2022 Dominican Republic population census, the city of Santiago de los Caballeros had 771,262 inhabitants. However, unlike the 2010 census, the District of Baitoa doesn't count as city population. However, the west part of the municipal core that included the neighborhood of Ingenio Arriba and Cienfiegos, were divided and created as municipal district in 2018.

==== Districts ====
As of 2022, the city has the following subdivisions:

Division	Status	Area in km^{2}	Population (2022)	Population Density
Hato del Yaque	District	37.96	34,458	907.6
La Canela	District	93.49	20,214	216.2
Pedro García	District	52.51	3,361	64.0
San Francisco de Jacagua	District	82.74	47,223	570.7
Santiago	Municipal Core	148.3	561,005	3,783
Santiago Oeste	District	16.67	105,487	6,329
Total	City		771,748	

=== Metropolitan Area ===
According to the Santiago 2030 strategic plan prepared by the Council for the Strategic Development of Santiago, Inc. (CDES) and published by the Santiago City Council in 2019, the municipalities of Licey Al Medio, Baitoa, Tamboril, Puñal and Villa González are part of the metropolitan area of Santiago de los Caballeros. According to the 2022 Dominican Republic population census, the summary of the municipalities and districts that composed the metropolitan area of Santiago de los Caballeros is 959,498 inhabitants. The population of the city of Santiago is expected to reach 852,634 inhabitants by 2030 and 1.066 million inhabitants in its metropolitan area.

As of 2022, The city has the metropolitan area as the following subdivisions:

Division	Status	Area in km^{2}	Population (2022)	Population Density
Hato del Yaque	District	37.96	34,458	907.6
La Canela	District	93.49	20,214	216.2
Pedro García	District	52.51	3,361	64.0
San Francisco de Jacagua	District	82.74	47,223	570.7
Santiago	Municipal Core	148.3	561,005	3,783
Santiago Oeste	District	16.67	105,487	6,329
Licey Al Medio	Municipality	14	15,437	1,116
Las Palomas	District	13	14,666	1,138
Baitoa	Municipality	52	11,690	223
Tamboril	Municipality	45	44,242	988
Canca La Piedra	District	27	13,427	495
Puñal	Municipality	24	25,915	1,100
Guayabal	District	20	7,670	388
Canabacoa	District	8	12,505	1,539
Villa González	Municipality	56	31,206	559
Palmar Arriba	District	13	6,874	544
El Limon	District	33	4,118	125
Total	Metropolitan Area	736 km2	959,498	

== Arts, Culture and Tourism ==
=== Architecture ===
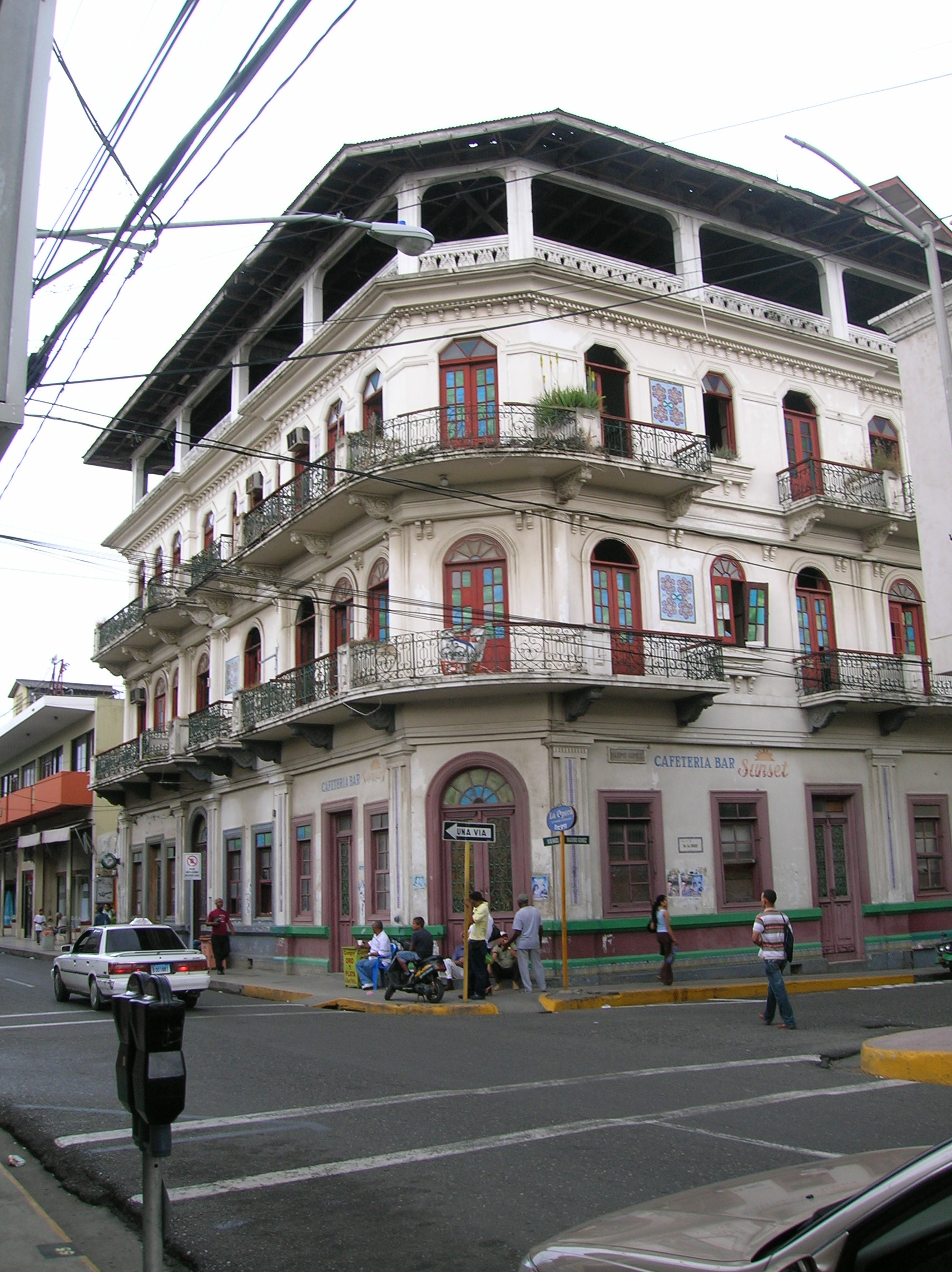
Hotel Mercedes in Santiago's historic center.

The Victorian era was the zenith of architecture in the city. Numerous residences were built in this European style, which makes up the historic center of Santiago. The neo-classical gothic Cathedral of Santiago was built in 1895 by Onofre de Lora, an architect native to the city.

The Hermanos Patiño Bridge is both the largest and oldest bridge in the city connecting the North and South sides of the city of Santiago. Its construction was started by Rafael Leónidas Trujillo and inaugurated in 1962, one year after his death. The bridge is named after the five brothers that died in an effort to end Trujillo's regime and dictatorship in the Dominican Republic in the mid 20th century. The anti-Trujillo legacy of the Patiño family did not begin with the brothers, but with their father who was killed in 1931 in the first anti-Trujillo insurrection of the Dominican Republic.

Centro de Recreo and Palacio Consistorial in Santiago.

On a hill overlooking Santiago is the city's tallest structure, a 67 m (220 ft) high marble monument named the Monumento de Santiago. Construction of the monument began in 1944 on the orders of then-dictator Rafael Trujillo. Monumento a los Héroes de la Restauración Trujillo was assassinated in 1961, after which the monument was renamed the Monumento a los Héroes de la Restauración ("Monument to the Heroes of the Restoration" in English), in honor of the Dominican Restoration War of 1863, in which the Dominican Republic regained its independence from Spain.

=== Museums ===
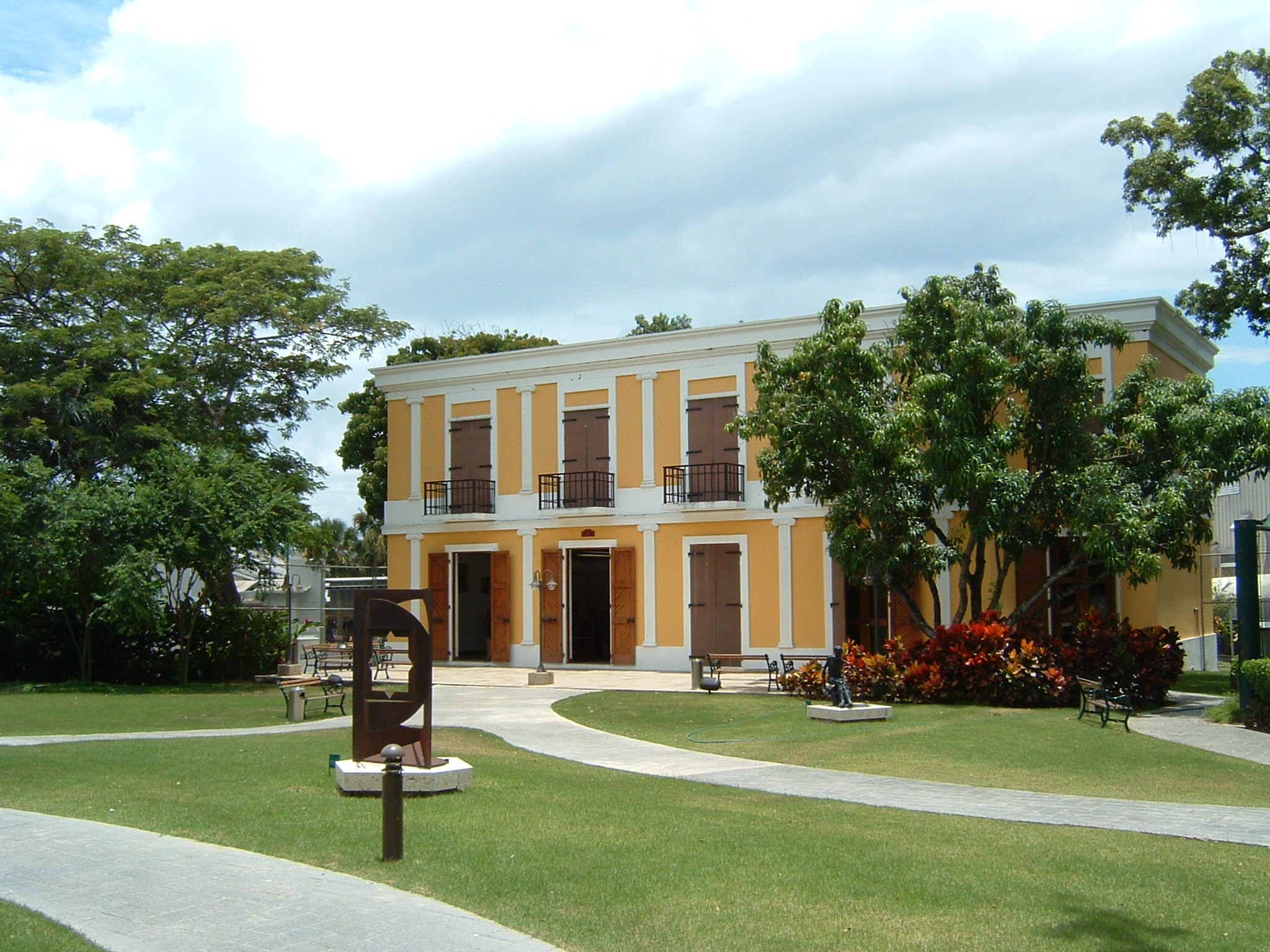
Aurora cigar factory.

Museums in the city include the Museo Folklórico Yoryi Morel which exhibits Santiago's Carnival culture, and displays some garments worn by lechones of Santiago Province in the Carnival, as well as those worn in other provinces. The museum is named after noted Santiago painter Yoryi Morel. Museo del Tabaco or The Tobacco Museum which shows manufacturing methods as well as the effect of the tobacco plantations along the city's history, the Museo Histórico Fortaleza San Luis or Historic San Luis Fort Museum which previously served as a municipal prison., the Museo de los Héroes de la Restauración or Restoration Heroes Museum is currently under construction and houses a display of pictures from the Restoration War from the 1863–1865 battles between the Dominican Government and the Spanish army. and Centro León which displays elements of the Caribbean and Dominican experience, natural Dominican history, and the evolution and culture of the indigenous Taíno peoples.

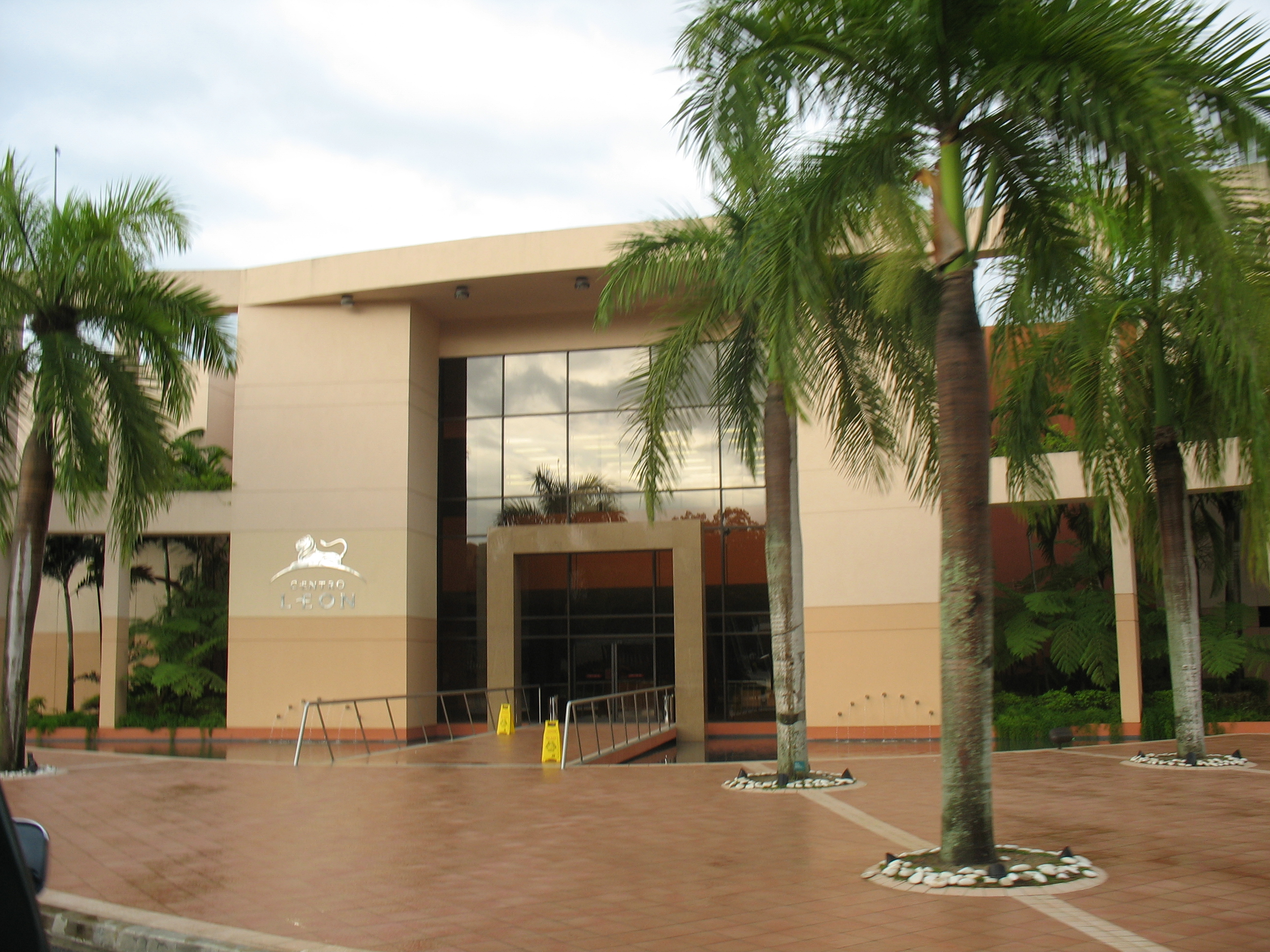
The Centro Leon exhibits Dominican culture and some Dominican customs and national parks

=== Tourism ===
The city of Santiago de los Caballeros is visited by 250,000 people daily and it is a reference point for different types of tourism: Health, Cultural, Gastronomic and local tourism. The profile of tourists in Santiago is 10% business and 85% diaspora. As of 2023, the city received over 60,000 international tourists for the health sector, 200% up from 20,000 tourists in 2015. During the 2024, a considerable number of new hotel rooms were built and projected nearly three thousand for 2025, of which 1,500 will be premium rooms. On the same year, Estadio Cibao FC was selected among the only two venues to held FIFA U-17 Women's World Cup. During the first four months of 2025, nearly 100,000 turist arrived at Cibao International Airport. During 2025, Santiago's airport received over 10% of the total number of tourist and visitors to the Dominican Republic.

In 2025, The Ministry of Tourism of the Dominican Republic disbursed the first contribution of 82 million pesos for the execution of the projects contemplated in the agreement signed with the institutions that make up Compromiso Santiago, which consists of promoting tourism in the city. Later the same year, the Mayor's Office of Santiago and the Association of Incoming Tour Operators of the Dominican Republic (Opetur) signed an agreement in Spain, within the framework of the International Tourism Fair (Fitur) 2025, with the aim of attracting tourists to visit the country and promoting the city, with an emphasis on promoting and empowering the Santiago Carnival. In the same event, the city of Santiago officially launched a city brand for the world, designed for business, culture and innovation, seeking to highlight the historical richness and dynamism of a city with extraordinary potential in the business and cultural sectors.

Among the most important sites to visit in Santiago are:

- Historic Center (Calle del Sol) (Old Town): It contains historical sites such as the San Luis Fortress, the city's first banks and the Santiago Apostol Cathedral. It receives from 50,000 to 75,000 people per day.
- Santiago Central Park: It has an area of 344,521 square meters, of which 21,000 square meters would be used for exhibitions, outdoor sports and recreational activitiest. As of 2018, received around 15,000 to 17,000 people each week. Expo Cibao, which is a multi-sector trade fair held in the city of Santiago, Dominican Republic, is considered the most important trade exhibition in the country and in the northern region, is annually held on the park. Also, Summer Food Fest is held on the park which is visited by 30,000 consumers every August annually.
- Santiago de los Caballeros Cable Car: Mostly used by internal tourism users, it is used by 60,000 people monthly. It is part of the Integrated Transport System (STI) of the city which includes with the Santiago Monorail.
- Monument to the Heroes of the Restoration: Inaugurated on September 30 of 1953, original named, "Monumento a la Paz de Trujillo", is the most symbolic and important place to visit in Santiago and The Cibao region. Considered a Cultural landmark in Santiago de los Caballeros and by many to be the most emblematic monument of the Dominican Republic, it was remodeled and inaugurated on August 16 of 2007. It is an important historical and cultural heritage site, which houses within it a significant portion of the history of Santiago and the country. In addition, the space is used to promote traditions, customs, art, music, folklore, sports, and many other elements and characteristics of the culture of the Dominican people. The city's iconic white marble tower, surrounded on all sides by a multi-level garden and offering panoramic views of the city. You can tour the interior of the 67-metre-high monument, named after the heroes of the Restoration War (1863–1865) who died in the fight to regain independence from Spain. It is located on the Castillo hill, which rises to approximately 302 meters above sea level in the heart of Santiago de los Caballeros. On the fifth floor it contains a panoramic view of the city. As of 2015, more than 100,000 torurist visited the monument annually. During 2025, it received 70,000 visitors.
- Centro Leon: Inaugurated on 3 October 2003, It is a museum and cultural center that promotes research and gathers 40 collections of visual arts, archaeology, ethnography, folklore, popular culture of the Dominican Republic as well as cartography, documentary and multimedia. In addition, it contains projects that have identity and habitability as thematic axes, and in its gardens, sociocultural animation and educational activities are carried out. Its buildings comply with the international standards established by the International Council of Museums and UNESCO. As of 2015, it receive over 90,000 students and visitors annually. During the 2016 receive over one millione of visitors and by 2024 it pass over 3 million of visitors in total during it 21 years of lifespan. It is the largest and most important private cultural center in the country
- Santiago Botanical Garden Funder: inaugurated on April 23 of 2018, It is conceived as “a natural space for the enjoyment of the whole family”, it consists of more than 600,000 square meters of land, 12 kilometers of paths and trails, a dozen themed gardens, a cycle path of almost 4 kilometers and a series of attractions that make it unique in its kind. During it first year, it was visited by 200,000 while on average 18,000 people walk or cycle every month. During 2019, over 10,000 students visited the park.
- Santiago Center Mall: considered the first green mall of the region and inaugurated in April 2025, The project has 110,000 square meters of construction. It operated under the concept of urban mixed use, consisting of a 14 stories Curio Collection by Hilton Hotel and a four floors of commercial area with 30 thousand m2 of GLA. It will be the first commercial building in Santiago and the entire Cibao to be certified as a “Green Building” under the Leadership in Energy and Environmental Design (LEED) standards.

== Sports ==
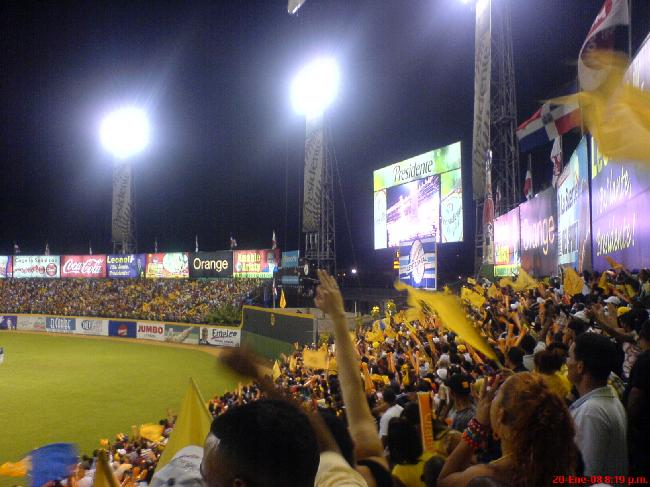
Estadio Cibao home of Las Aguilas Cibaeñas baseball team.

Baseball is a major professional sport in Santiago de los Caballeros, which is home to Águilas Cibaeñas of the Dominican winter league. Professional basketball is also played in the city, with local competitions organized by the Asociación de Baloncesto de Santiago de los Treinta Caballeros (ABASACA). Águilas Cibaeñas has won multiple national championships and Caribbean Series titles and has a long-standing rivalry with Tigres del Licey.

Santiago's major baseball and basketball teams are Las Aguilas Cibaeñas and Los Metros de Santiago.

Santiago has two stadiums, and the stadiums are The Estadio Cibao home of the Aguilas Cibaeñas and The Gran Arena del Cibao home of Los Metros de Santiago

The Female Volleyball Team have claimed two bronze medals in the professional Dominican Volleyball League.

In early 2015, there was the official launch of Liga Dominicana de Fútbol in the Dominican Republic. Santiago is the first city in the country to hold a FIFA Certified Stadium, which was built in the campus of the Pontificia Universidad Catolica Madre y Maestra and became the home of the major and first city soccer team Cibao FC from Liga Dominicana de Fútbol.

== Education ==
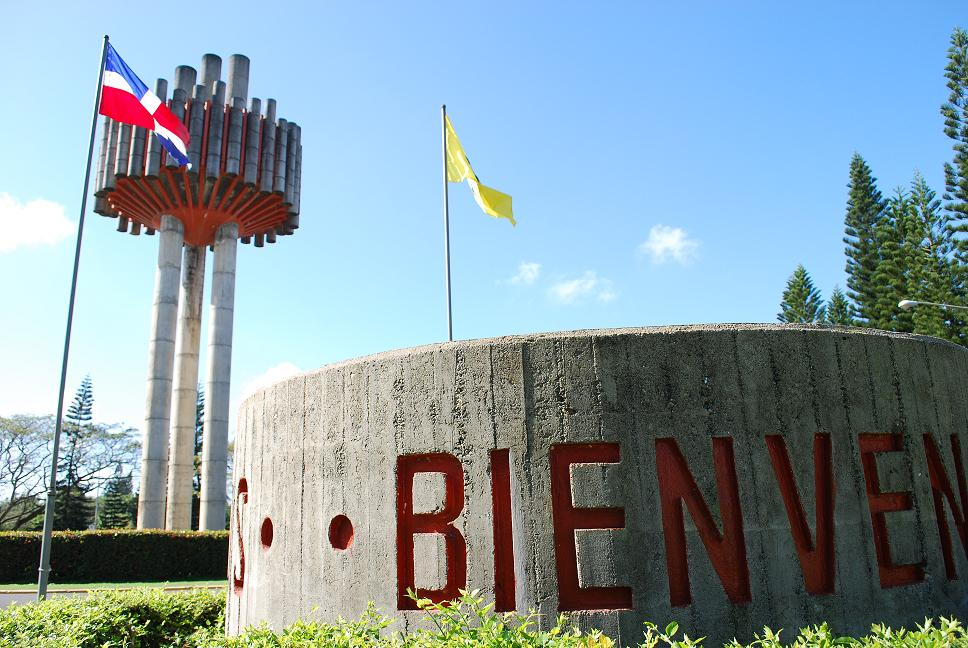
Principal entrance of Pontificia Universidad Catolica Madre y Maestra (PUCMM)

Santiago is home of several universities including the prestigious Pontificia Universidad Católica Madre y Maestra (PUCMM) and Universidad Tecnológica de Santiago (UTESA). Other higher learning institutions present in Santiago are: Universidad Organización & Método (O&M), Universidad Abierta para Adultos (UAPA), Universidad Nacional Evangélica and one regional campus belonging to the Universidad Autónoma de Santo Domingo

Santiago is also home to a Binational Center, the Centro Cultural Domínico-Americano (CCDA), which was founded in 1962 by a group of Dominicans and Americans living in Santiago. At the beginning, the CCDA set about providing English language courses. Later, the library was opened and included the lending of overhead projectors and documentary films. These last two were sponsored by the American Embassy.

CCDA is located on Estrella Sadhalá Avenue. These facilities of the CCDA were opened on July 23, 1962. Throughout its 50 years of existence, the CCDA has taught English language courses, painting classes and manual activities.

== Transportation ==
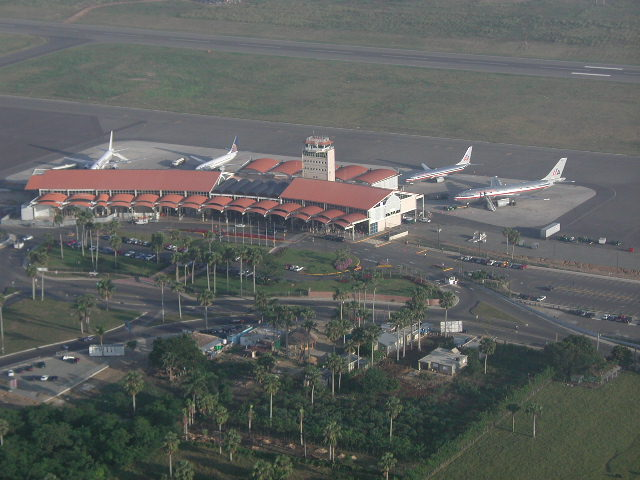
Cibao International Airport in 2003 AIC

Santiago is served by several forms of public transportation, including share taxis locally known as carros públicos or conchos and private and independent bus owners who form their own routes according to their demands.

The Santiago Cable Car (Teleférico de Santiago) opened on 17 March 2024 and forms part of the city's integrated public transportation system. Its first line runs approximately 4km between La Yaguita del Pastor and the Central Terminal at Las Carreras, with four stations. The system has a capacity of approximately 4,000 passengers per hour in each direction.

Santiago Cable Car, with Pico Diego de Ocampo in the background.

Santiago is also constructing the Santiago Monorail, a 12.8 km elevated rapid-transit line intended to serve as another principal component of the city's integrated transportation system. Construction was reported to be more than 90% complete in 2026, with dynamic testing scheduled for the final months of the year and passenger service planned for late 2026.

The Autopista Juan Pablo Duarte highway, officially known as DR-1, connects Santiago with Santo Domingo and forms the principal highway corridor between Cibao region and the national capital. Other highways connect Santiago with Puerto Plata and the northwestern region of the country.

The Cibao International Airport, located southeast of the city, is the principal airport serving Santiago and the surrounding Cibao region. It provides international service, particularly to destinations in the United States and the Caribbean. The former Santiago Municipal Airport ceased operations in 2002 following the opening of Cibao International Airport.

== Health ==
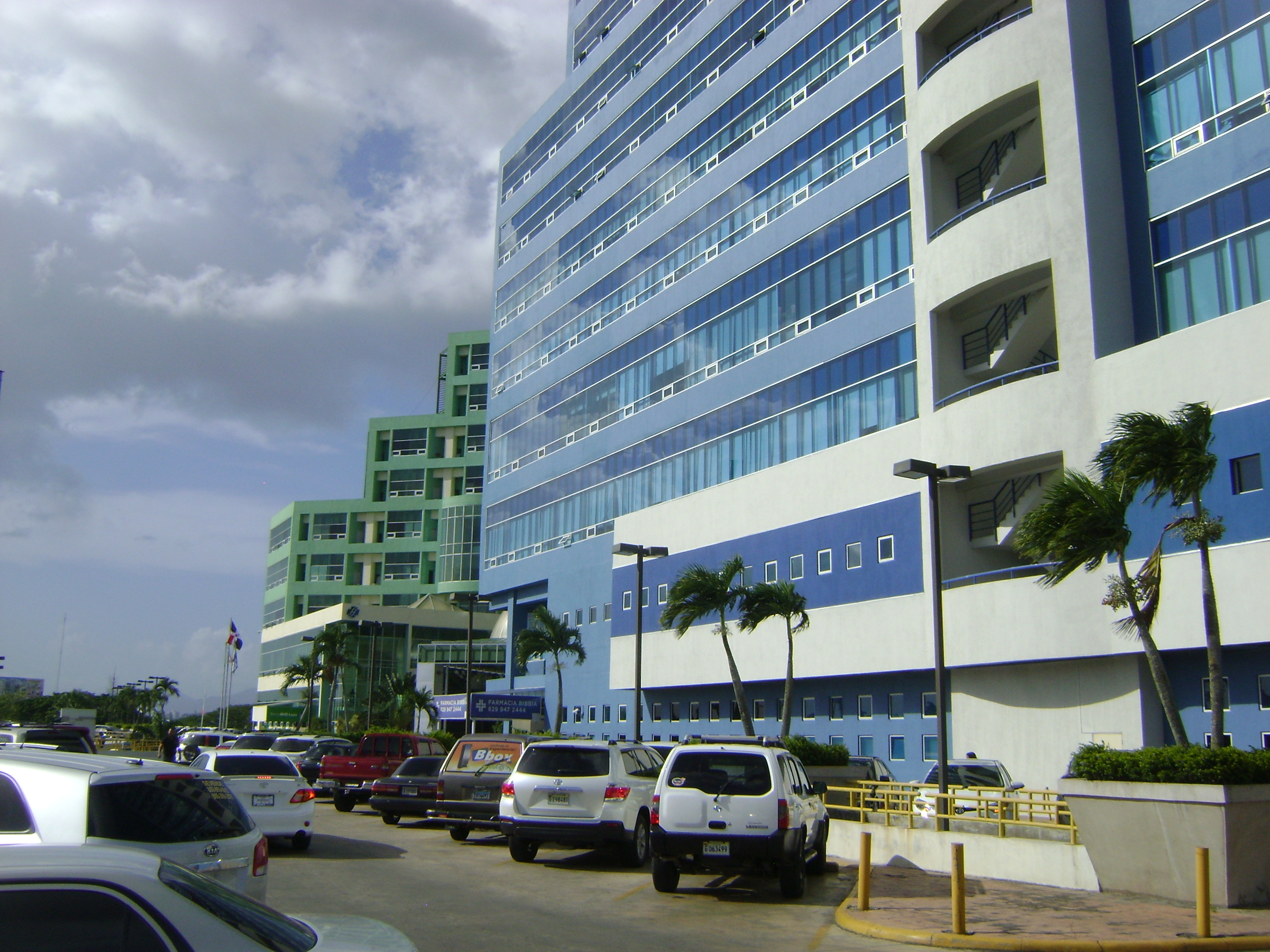
Hospital Metropolitano de Santiago

Facilities include Hospital Cabral y Baez, Clínica Corominas, Hospital De Especialidades Medicas Materno Infantil, Union Médica, and Hospital Metropolitano De Santiago (HOMS), being the largest hospital in all of the Dominican Republic and in all the Caribbean

== Notable people from Santiago de los Caballeros ==
=== Actors, artists, musicians, writers ===
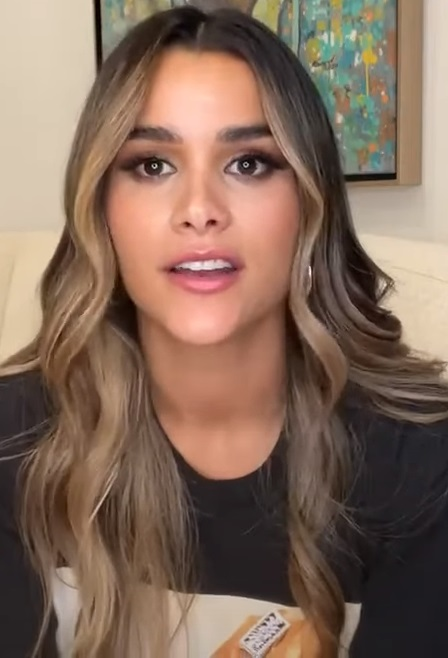
Clarissa Molina

- Fernando Cabrera – poet, visual artist and songwriter
- Aisha Syed Castro – violinist
- Laura García-Godoy – actress
- Eddy Herrera – Merengue singer
- Krisspy – Merengue singer
- Clara Ledesma – painter
- Ñico Lora – Merengue musician
- La Materialista – rapper and actress
- Clarissa Molina – actress
- Natti Natasha – musician
- Johnny Pacheco – musician
- Manny Pérez – actor
- Frank Perozo – actor
- Nereyda Rodríguez – dancer
- Mu-Kien Adriana Sang – historian, essayist, analyst, political scientist, and academic
- Julio Vega Batlle – author and diplomat
- Miguel Vila Luna – architect and painter

=== Athletes ===
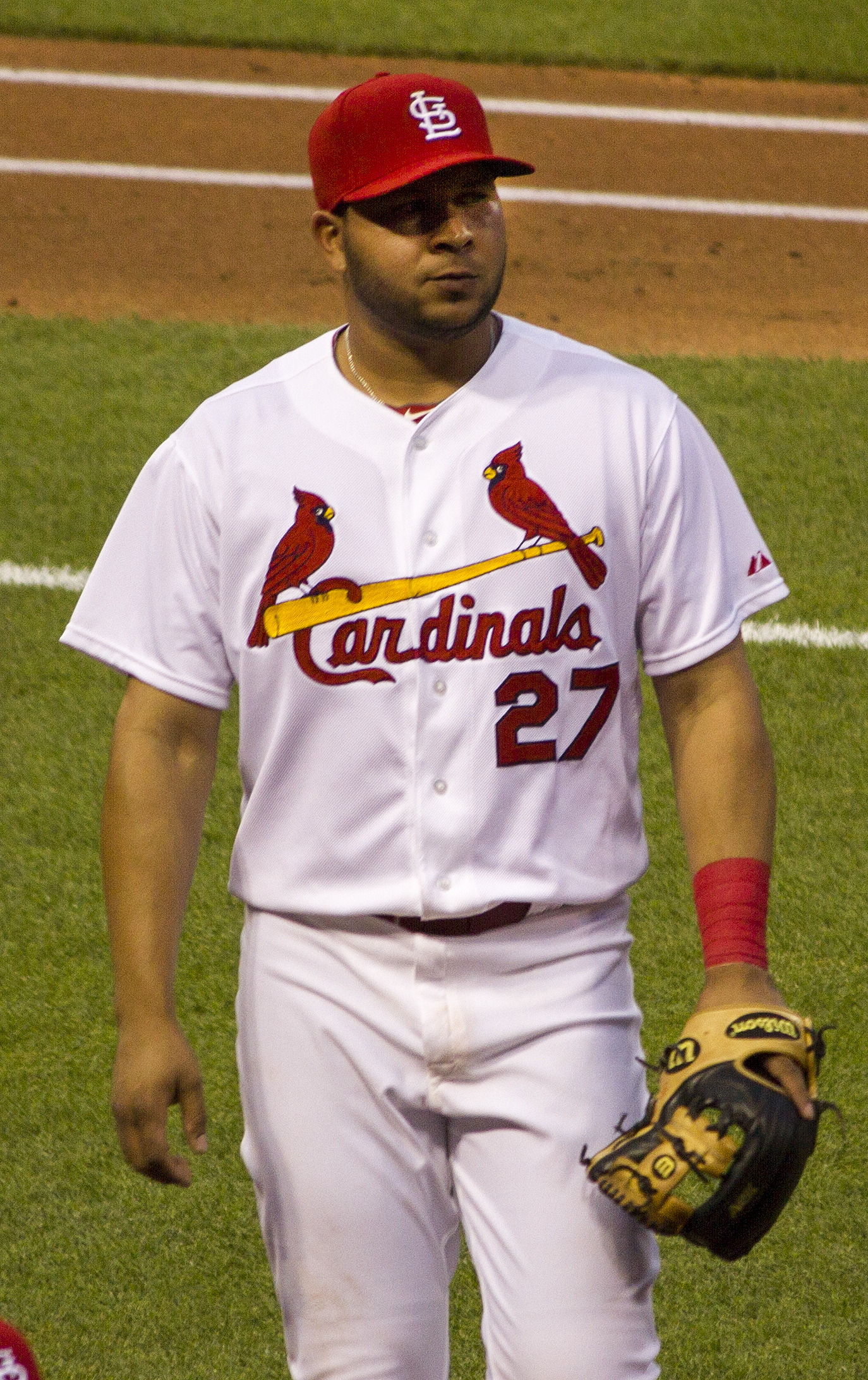
Jhonny Peralta

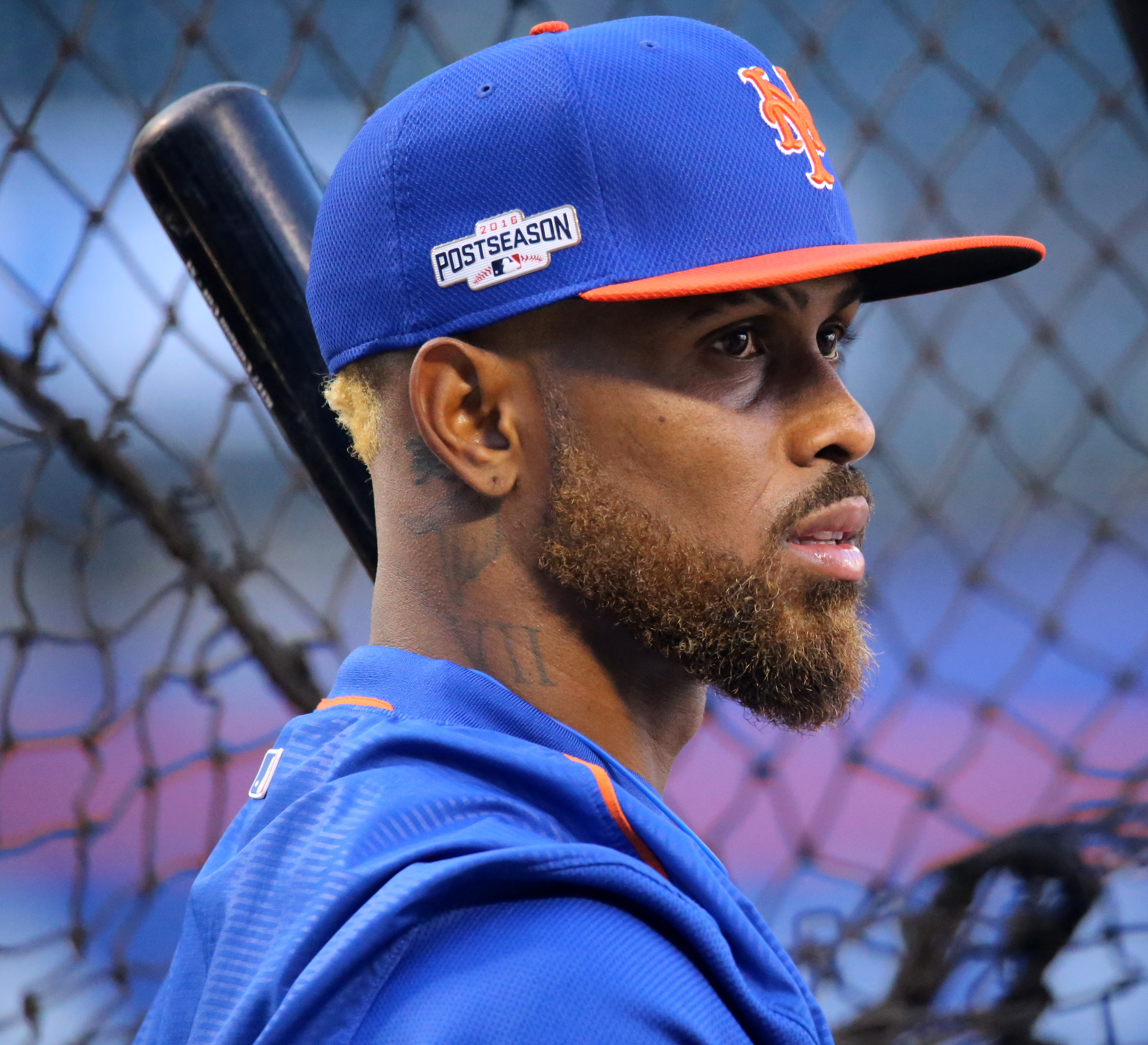
Jose Reyes

- Al Alburquerque – baseball pitcher
- Carlos Almanzar – baseball pitcher
- Rafael Belliard – baseball player and cousin of Washington Nationals 2B Ronnie Belliard
- Joaquín Benoit – baseball pitcher
- Ángel Berroa – baseball player
- Victor Estrella Burgos – tennis player, first Dominican to win an ATP tournament, first Dominican on the ATP top 100
- Edward Cabrera – baseball player for the Miami Marlins
- José Cabrera – MLB pitcher for the Houston Astros, Atlanta Braves and Milwaukee Brewers
- Kelvin Cáceres – baseball pitcher
- Bernie Castro – baseball player
- Bill Castro–MLB player for the Milwaukee Brewers, New York Yankees, and Kansas City Royals; pitching coach of the Milwaukee Brewers
- Robinson Checo – baseball pitcher
- Leonardo Cruz – boxer
- Víctor Díaz – baseball player for the Baltimore Orioles
- Marcos Diplan – Major League Baseball pitcher
- Leo Garcia – baseball player
- Carlos Gómez – baseball player for the Texas Rangers
- Rudy Hernández – baseball pitcher
- José Lima – baseball pitcher
- Winston Llenas – baseball player
- Luis Felipe Lopez – 1st Dominican-born player drafted in the 1st round of the 1998 NBA draft
- Victor Martinez – IFBB bodybuilder, runner-up many years for Mr. Olympia
- Christopher Morel – baseball player for the Chicago Cubs
- Reyes Moronta – baseball pitcher for the San Francisco Giants
- Ramon Antonio Nery – boxer
- Franquelis Osoria – baseball pitcher
- Francisco Peña – baseball player for the New York Mets; son of Tony Peña and brother of Tony Peña Jr.
- Ramón Peña – baseball relief pitcher and member of the famous baseball Pena family
- Tony Peña Jr. – baseball pitcher
- Jhonny Peralta – baseball player
- Hipólito Pichardo – baseball pitcher for the Kansas City Royals, Boston Red Sox and Houston Astros
- Luis Polonia – baseball player
- Luis Pujols – baseball player
- Jose Reyes – baseball player for the New York Mets
- Luis Silverio – baseball player who is now a coach
- Alfredo Simón – baseball pitcher for the Baltimore Orioles
- Julián Tavárez – baseball pitcher
- Carlos Triunfel – baseball player for the Seattle Mariners organization
- Carlos Villanueva – MLB pitcher for the Toronto Blue Jays

=== Politicians ===
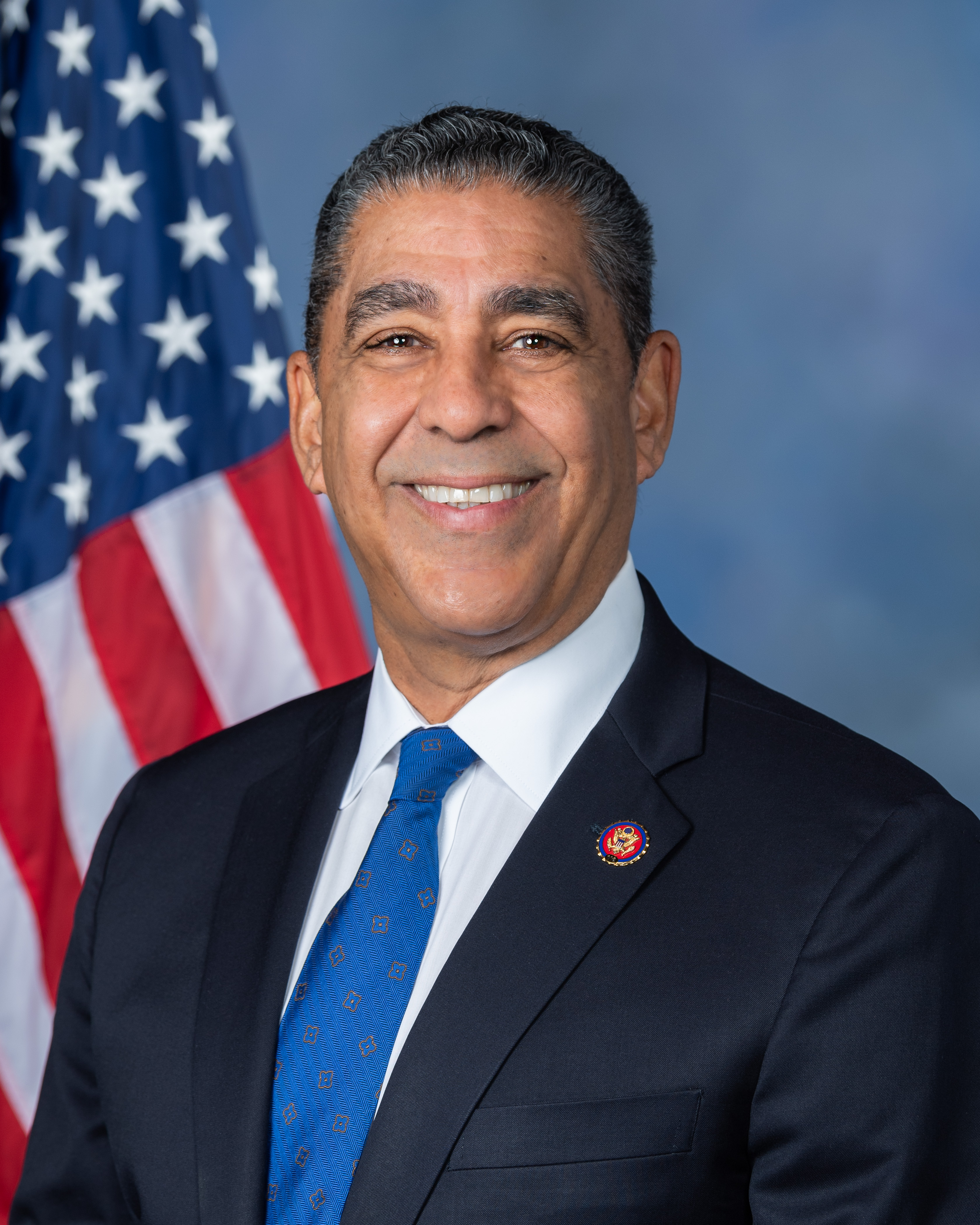
Adriano Espaillat

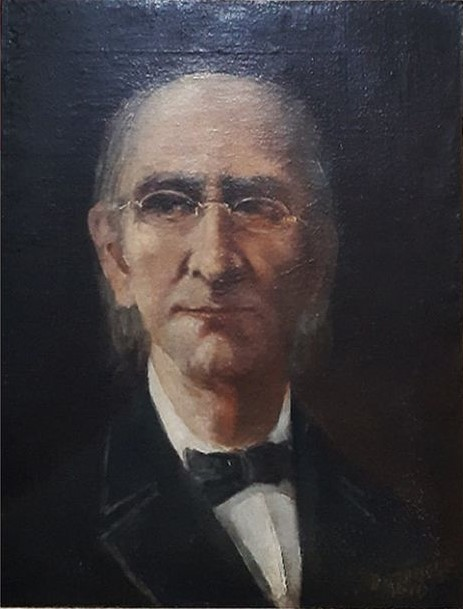
Ulises Francisco Espaillat

- Joaquín Balaguer – Dominican President
- Salvador Jorge Blanco – Dominican President, lawyer and a writer
- Rafael Filiberto Bonnelly – Dominican President, lawyer, scholar and diplomat
- Adriano Espaillat – U.S. representative for New York
- Ulises Francisco Espaillat – Dominican President, and author
- Rafael Estrella Ureña – Dominican President
- Antonio Guzmán Fernández – Dominican President
- Hipólito Mejía – Dominican President
- Raquel Peña de Antuña – Dominican Vice President
- Francisco Augusto Lora – Dominican Vice President, Ambassador to Washington, USA, lawyer
- Abel Martínez – Dominican and former mayor of Santiago, lawyer

=== Other ===
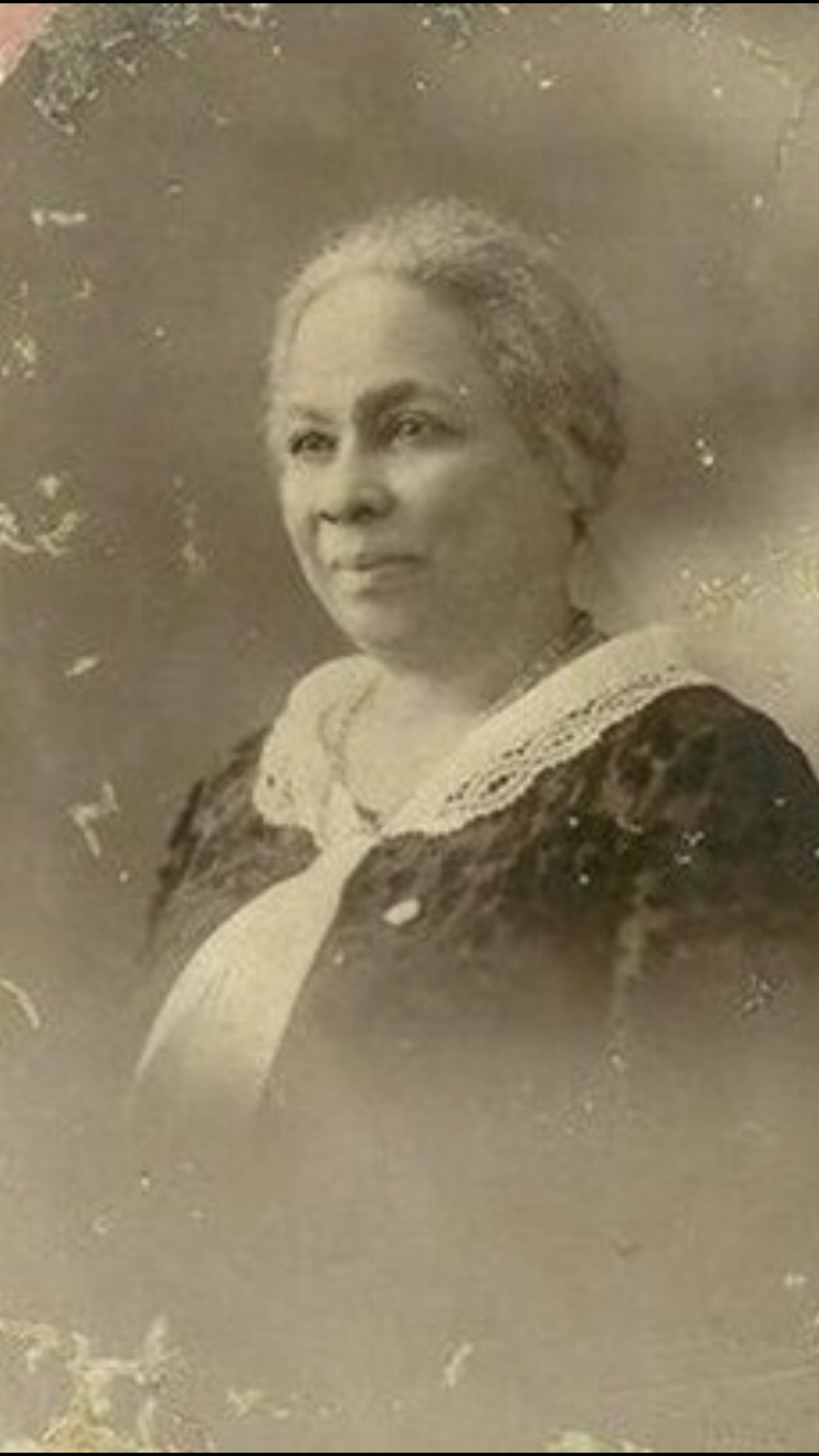
Rosa Smester

- Miguel Cocco – businessman
- Martha Heredia – Latin American Idol
- Clarissa Molina – Miss Dominican Republic 2015 – Nuestra Bellaza Latina VIP 2016
- Mons. Agripino Núñez Collado – former rector of Pontificia Universidad Católica Madre y Maestra
- Ercilia Pepín – teacher, feminist, and equal rights activist
- Rosa Smester Marrero – educator and feminist writer, who founded a hospice and school in the city.
- Amelia Vega – Miss Dominican Republic 2002, Miss Universe 2003

== Twin towns – sister cities ==
Santiago has twinning agreements with the following sister cities:

- Fort Myers, Florida (United States)
- Havana (Cuba)
- Santiago de Compostela (Spain)
- San Juan, Puerto Rico (United States)
- Mayagüez, Puerto Rico (United States)

== Photo gallery ==
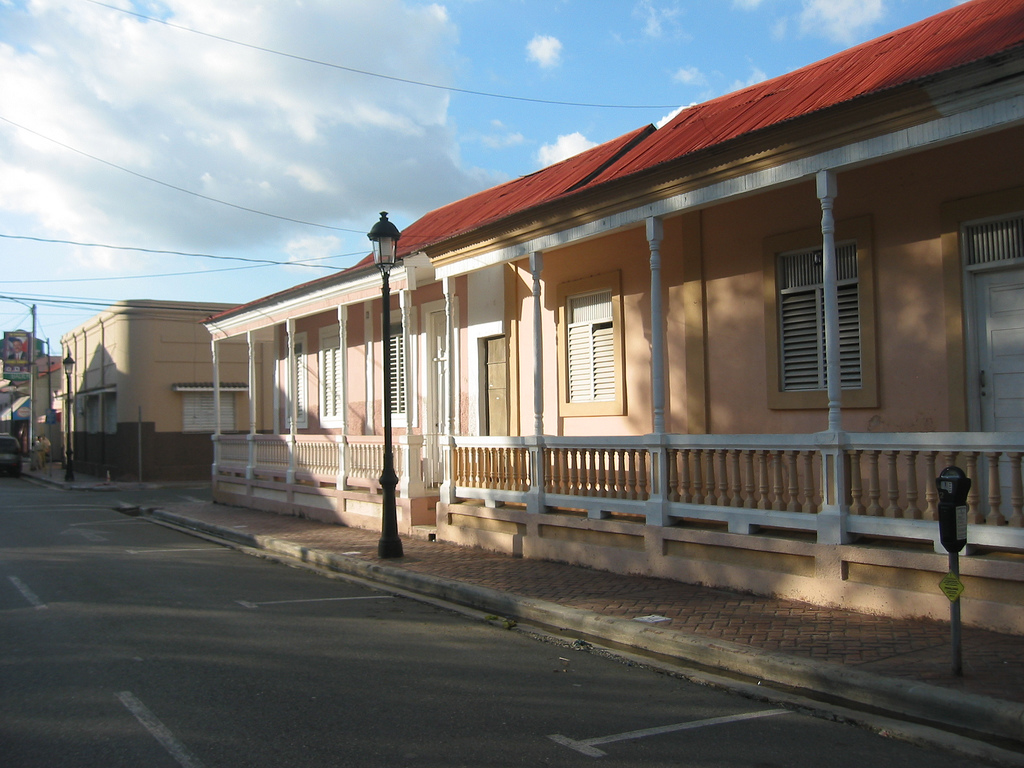
Houses in Santiago's Old Historic Center

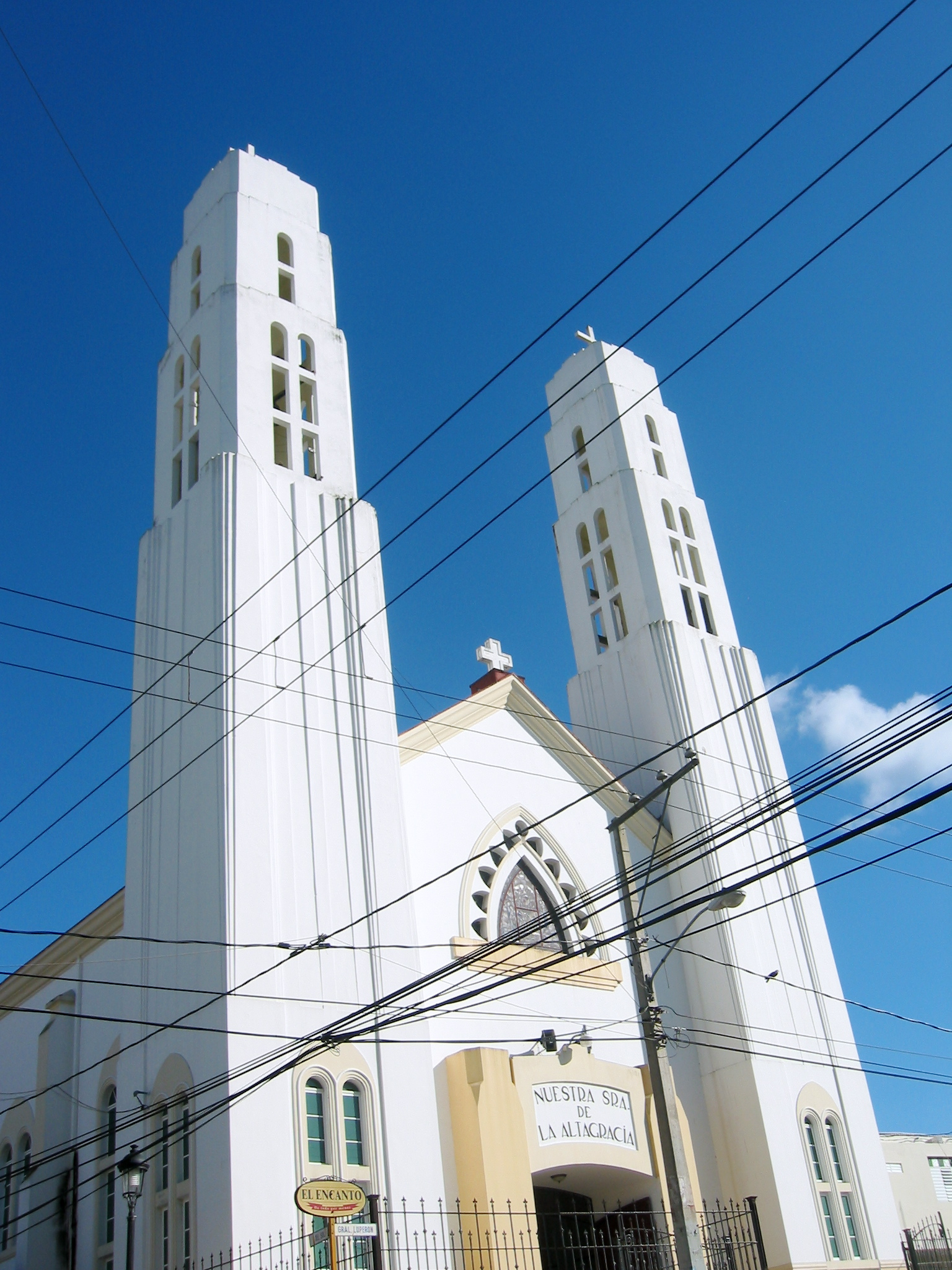
Nuestra Señora de la Altagracia Catholic Church

Gran Teatro del Cibao

Shadow of the Monumento de Santiago

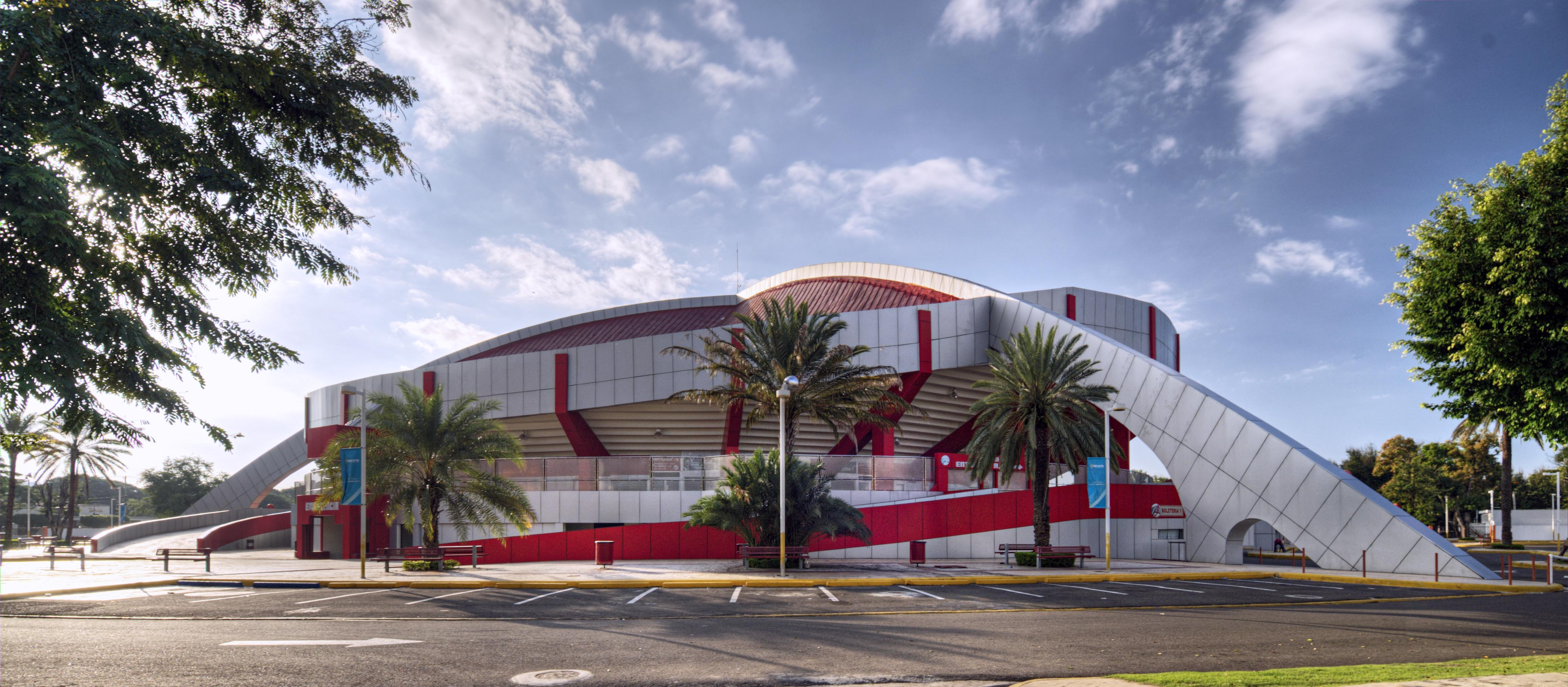
Gran Arena del Cibao

== See also ==
- Santiago Province
- Cibao region
- List of cities in the Dominican Republic
- Dominican War of Independence
- History of the Dominican Republic
