= Volleyball at the 2020 Summer Olympics =

Volleyball at the Games of the XXXII Olympiad
- Pictograms for indoor (left) and beach volleyball (right)
- Venue: Ariake Arena (indoor); Shiokaze Park (beach)
- Dates: 24 July – 8 August 2021
- No. of events: 4
- Competitors: 382 from 31 nations

The volleyball tournaments at the 2020 Summer Olympics in Tokyo were played between 24 July and 8 August 2021. 24 volleyball teams and 48 beach volleyball teams participated in the tournament. The indoor volleyball competition took place at Ariake Arena in Ariake, and the beach volleyball tournament at Shiokaze Park, in the temporary Shiokaze Park Stadium.

It was originally scheduled to take place in 2020, but due to the COVID-19 pandemic, the IOC and the Tokyo 2020 Organising Committee announced on 24 March 2020 that the 2020 Summer Olympics would be delayed to 2021.

== Schedule ==
Legend
P	Preliminary round	⅛	Round of 16	¼	Quarter-finals	½	Semi-finals	B	Bronze medal match	F	Final

Date Event	Sat 24	Sun 25	Mon 26	Tue 27	Wed 28	Thu 29	Fri 30	Sat 31	Sun 1	Mon 2	Tue 3	Wed 4	Thu 5	Fri 6		Sat 7		Sun 8	
Men's indoor	P		P		P		P		P		1/4		1/2			B	F		
Women's indoor		P		P		P		P		P		1/4		1/2				B	F
Men's beach	P	P	P	P	P	P	P	P	1/8	1/8		1/4	1/2			B	F		
Women's beach	P	P	P	P	P	P	P	P	1/8	1/8	1/4		1/2	B	F				

== Medal summary ==
=== Medal table ===
* Host nation (Japan)

Rank	Nation	Gold	Silver	Bronze	Total
1	United States	2	0	0	2
2	France	1	0	0	1
2	Norway	1	0	0	1
4	ROC	0	2	0	2
5	Australia	0	1	0	1
5	Brazil	0	1	0	1
7	Argentina	0	0	1	1
7	Qatar	0	0	1	1
7	Serbia	0	0	1	1
7	Switzerland	0	0	1	1
Totals (10 entries)		4	4	4	12

=== Medalists ===
==== Beach volleyball ====
Event	Gold	Silver	Bronze
Men's beach	Norway; Anders Mol; Christian Sørum	ROC; Viacheslav Krasilnikov; Oleg Stoyanovskiy	Qatar; Cherif Younousse; Ahmed Tijan
Women's beach	United States; April Ross; Alix Klineman	Australia; Taliqua Clancy; Mariafe Artacho del Solar	Switzerland; Joana Heidrich; Anouk Vergé-Dépré

==== Indoor volleyball ====
Event	Gold	Silver	Bronze
Men's indoor	France; Barthélémy Chinenyeze; Jenia Grebennikov (L); Jean Patry; Benjamin Toniutti (c); Kevin Tillie; Earvin N'Gapeth; Antoine Brizard; Stephen Boyer; Nicolas Le Goff; Daryl Bultor; Trévor Clévenot; Yacine Louati	ROC; Yaroslav Podlesnykh; Artem Volvich; Dmitry Volkov; Ivan Iakovlev; Denis Bogdan; Pavel Pankov; Viktor Poletaev; Maxim Mikhailov; Egor Kliuka; Ilyas Kurkaev; Igor Kobzar (c); Valentin Golubev (L)	Argentina; Matías Sánchez; Federico Pereyra; Cristian Poglajen; Facundo Conte; Agustín Loser; Santiago Danani (L); Sebastián Solé; Bruno Lima; Ezequiel Palacios (c); Luciano De Cecco; Nicolás Méndez; Martín Ramos
Women's indoor	United States; Micha Hancock; Jordyn Poulter; Justine Wong-Orantes (L); Jordan Larson (c); Annie Drews; Jordan Thompson; Michelle Bartsch-Hackley; Kimberly Hill; Foluke Akinradewo; Haleigh Washington; Kelsey Robinson; Chiaka Ogbogu	Brazil; Carol Gattaz; Rosamaria Montibeller; Macris Carneiro; Roberta Ratzke; Gabriela Guimarães; Tandara Caixeta; Natália Pereira (c); Ana Carolina da Silva; Fernanda Garay; Ana Cristina de Souza; Camila Brait (L); Ana Beatriz Corrêa	Serbia; Bianka Buša; Mina Popović; Slađana Mirković; Brankica Mihajlović; Maja Ognjenović (c); Ana Bjelica; Maja Aleksić; Milena Rašić; Silvija Popović (L); Tijana Bošković; Bojana Milenković; Jelena Blagojević

== Qualification summary ==
This qualification pathways were confirmed by the Fédération Internationale de Volleyball on 23 September 2018.

=== Men's volleyball ===
Event		Dates	Venue(s)	Quota	Qualifier(s)
Host nation		—N/a		1	Japan
Intercontinental Qualifier	Pool A	9–11 August 2019	(Bulgaria) Varna	1	Brazil
Intercontinental Qualifier	Pool B	9–11 August 2019	(Netherlands) Rotterdam	1	United States
Intercontinental Qualifier	Pool C	9–11 August 2019	(Italy) Bari	1	Italy
Intercontinental Qualifier	Pool D	9–11 August 2019	(Poland) Gdańsk–Sopot	1	Poland
Intercontinental Qualifier	Pool E	9–11 August 2019	(Russia) Saint Petersburg	1	(Russia) ROC
Intercontinental Qualifier	Pool F	9–11 August 2019	(China) Ningbo	1	Argentina
European Qualifier		5–10 January 2020	(Germany) Berlin	1	France
Asian Qualifier		7–12 January 2020	(China) Jiangmen	1	Iran
African Qualifier		7–11 January 2020	(Egypt) Cairo	1	Tunisia
South American Qualifier		10–12 January 2020	(Chile) Mostazal	1	Venezuela
North American Qualifier		10–12 January 2020	(Canada) Vancouver	1	Canada
Total				12	

=== Women's volleyball ===
Event		Dates	Venue(s)	Quota	Qualifier(s)
Host nation		—N/a		1	Japan
Intercontinental Qualifier	Pool A	1–4 August 2019	(Poland) Wrocław	1	Serbia
Intercontinental Qualifier	Pool B	1–4 August 2019	(China) Ningbo	1	China
Intercontinental Qualifier	Pool C	1–4 August 2019	(United States) Bossier City	1	United States
Intercontinental Qualifier	Pool D	1–4 August 2019	(Brazil) Uberlândia	1	Brazil
Intercontinental Qualifier	Pool E	1–4 August 2019	(Russia) Kaliningrad	1	ROC
Intercontinental Qualifier	Pool F	1–4 August 2019	(Italy) Catania	1	Italy
African Qualifier		5–9 January 2020	(Cameroon) Yaoundé	1	Kenya
South American Qualifier		7–9 January 2020	(Colombia) Bogotá	1	Argentina
Asian Qualifier		7–12 January 2020	(Thailand) Nakhon Ratchasima	1	South Korea
European Qualifier		7–12 January 2020	(Netherlands) Apeldoorn	1	Turkey
North American Qualifier		10–12 January 2020	(Dominican Republic) Santo Domingo	1	Dominican Republic
Total				12	

=== Men's beach volleyball ===
Means of qualification	Date	Venue	Vacancies	Qualified
Host nation	—N/a	—N/a	1	Japan
2019 World Championships	28 June – 7 July 2019	(Germany) Hamburg	1	ROC
2019 FIVB Olympic Qualification Tournament	18–22 September 2019	(China) Haiyang	2	Italy
2019 FIVB Olympic Qualification Tournament	18–22 September 2019	(China) Haiyang	2	Latvia
FIVB Beach Volleyball Olympic Ranking	13 June 2021	(Switzerland) Lausanne	15	Norway
FIVB Beach Volleyball Olympic Ranking	13 June 2021	(Switzerland) Lausanne	15	Qatar
FIVB Beach Volleyball Olympic Ranking	13 June 2021	(Switzerland) Lausanne	15	Brazil
FIVB Beach Volleyball Olympic Ranking	13 June 2021	(Switzerland) Lausanne	15	Poland
FIVB Beach Volleyball Olympic Ranking	13 June 2021	(Switzerland) Lausanne	15	Netherlands
FIVB Beach Volleyball Olympic Ranking	13 June 2021	(Switzerland) Lausanne	15	Brazil
FIVB Beach Volleyball Olympic Ranking	13 June 2021	(Switzerland) Lausanne	15	Germany
FIVB Beach Volleyball Olympic Ranking	13 June 2021	(Switzerland) Lausanne	15	ROC
FIVB Beach Volleyball Olympic Ranking	13 June 2021	(Switzerland) Lausanne	15	Czech Republic
FIVB Beach Volleyball Olympic Ranking	13 June 2021	(Switzerland) Lausanne	15	United States
FIVB Beach Volleyball Olympic Ranking	13 June 2021	(Switzerland) Lausanne	15	United States
FIVB Beach Volleyball Olympic Ranking	13 June 2021	(Switzerland) Lausanne	15	Spain
FIVB Beach Volleyball Olympic Ranking	13 June 2021	(Switzerland) Lausanne	15	Poland
FIVB Beach Volleyball Olympic Ranking	13 June 2021	(Switzerland) Lausanne	15	Italy
FIVB Beach Volleyball Olympic Ranking	13 June 2021	(Switzerland) Lausanne	15	Chile
2018–2020 CEV Continental Cup Final	23–26 June 2021	(Netherlands) The Hague	1	Switzerland
2018–2020 AVC Continental Cup Final	25–27 June 2021	(Thailand) Nakhon Pathom	1	Australia
2018–2020 CAVB Continental Cup Final	25–27 June 2021	(Morocco) Agadir	1	Morocco
2018–2020 NORCECA Continental Cup Final	25–27 June 2021	(Mexico) Colima	1	Mexico
2018–2020 CSV Continental Cup Final	26–27 June 2021	(Chile) Santiago	1	Argentina
Total			24	

=== Women's beach volleyball ===
Means of qualification	Date	Venue	Vacancies	Qualified
Host nation	—N/a	—N/a	1	Japan
2019 World Championships	28 June – 7 July 2019	(Germany) Hamburg	1	Canada
2019 FIVB Olympic Qualification Tournament	18–22 September 2019	(China) Haiyang	2	Latvia
2019 FIVB Olympic Qualification Tournament	18–22 September 2019	(China) Haiyang	2	Spain
FIVB Beach Volleyball Olympic Ranking	13 June 2021	(Switzerland) Lausanne	15	United States
FIVB Beach Volleyball Olympic Ranking	13 June 2021	(Switzerland) Lausanne	15	Brazil
FIVB Beach Volleyball Olympic Ranking	13 June 2021	(Switzerland) Lausanne	15	Brazil
FIVB Beach Volleyball Olympic Ranking	13 June 2021	(Switzerland) Lausanne	15	Australia
FIVB Beach Volleyball Olympic Ranking	13 June 2021	(Switzerland) Lausanne	15	United States
FIVB Beach Volleyball Olympic Ranking	13 June 2021	(Switzerland) Lausanne	15	Switzerland
FIVB Beach Volleyball Olympic Ranking	13 June 2021	(Switzerland) Lausanne	15	ROC
FIVB Beach Volleyball Olympic Ranking	13 June 2021	(Switzerland) Lausanne	15	Canada
FIVB Beach Volleyball Olympic Ranking	13 June 2021	(Switzerland) Lausanne	15	Switzerland
FIVB Beach Volleyball Olympic Ranking	13 June 2021	(Switzerland) Lausanne	15	Netherlands
FIVB Beach Volleyball Olympic Ranking	13 June 2021	(Switzerland) Lausanne	15	China
FIVB Beach Volleyball Olympic Ranking	13 June 2021	(Switzerland) Lausanne	15	Czech Republic
FIVB Beach Volleyball Olympic Ranking	13 June 2021	(Switzerland) Lausanne	15	Germany
FIVB Beach Volleyball Olympic Ranking	13 June 2021	(Switzerland) Lausanne	15	Germany
FIVB Beach Volleyball Olympic Ranking	13 June 2021	(Switzerland) Lausanne	15	Italy
2018–2020 CEV Continental Cup Final	23–26 June 2021	(Netherlands) The Hague	1	Netherlands
2018–2020 AVC Continental Cup Final	25–27 June 2021	(Thailand) Nakhon Pathom	1	China
2018–2020 CAVB Continental Cup Final	25–27 June 2021	(Morocco) Agadir	1	Kenya
2018–2020 NORCECA Continental Cup Final	25–27 June 2021	(Mexico) Colima	1	Cuba
2018–2020 CSV Continental Cup Final	26–27 June 2021	(Paraguay) Asunción	1	Argentina
Total			24	

== Men's indoor tournament ==
=== Pool A ===
Pos	Team	Pld	W	L	Pts	SW	SL	SR	SPW	SPL	SPR	Qualification
1	Poland	5	4	1	13	14	4	3.500	435	365	1.192	Quarterfinals
2	Italy	5	4	1	11	12	7	1.714	447	411	1.088	Quarterfinals
3	Japan (H)	5	3	2	8	10	9	1.111	437	433	1.009	Quarterfinals
4	Canada	5	2	3	7	9	9	1.000	396	387	1.023	Quarterfinals
5	Iran	5	2	3	6	9	11	0.818	453	460	0.985	
6	Venezuela	5	0	5	0	1	15	0.067	281	393	0.715	

Source: Tokyo 2020 and FIVB
Rules for classification: Tiebreakers
(H) Host

=== Pool B ===
Pos	Team	Pld	W	L	Pts	SW	SL	SR	SPW	SPL	SPR	Qualification
1	ROC	5	4	1	12	13	5	2.600	427	397	1.076	Quarterfinals
2	Brazil	5	4	1	10	12	8	1.500	476	450	1.058	Quarterfinals
3	Argentina	5	3	2	8	12	10	1.200	476	464	1.026	Quarterfinals
4	France	5	2	3	8	10	10	1.000	449	442	1.016	Quarterfinals
5	United States	5	2	3	6	8	10	0.800	432	412	1.049	
6	Tunisia	5	0	5	1	3	15	0.200	339	434	0.781	

Source: Tokyo 2020 and FIVB
Rules for classification: Tiebreakers

=== Knockout stage ===
Quarterfinals
3 August
Poland	2
France	3
3 August
Italy	2
Argentina	3
3 August
Japan	0
Brazil	3
3 August
Canada	0
ROC	3

Semifinals
5 August
France	3
Argentina	0
5 August
Brazil	1
ROC	3

Gold medal match
7 August
France	3
ROC	2
Bronze medal match
7 August
Argentina	3
Brazil	2

=== Final standings ===
Rank	Team
1st place, gold medalist(s)	France
2nd place, silver medalist(s)	ROC
3rd place, bronze medalist(s)	Argentina
4	Brazil
5	Poland
6	Italy
7	Japan
8	Canada
9	Iran
10	United States
11	Tunisia
12	Venezuela

== Women's indoor tournament ==
=== Pool A ===
Pos	Team	Pld	W	L	Pts	SW	SL	SR	SPW	SPL	SPR	Qualification
1	Brazil	5	5	0	14	15	3	5.000	434	315	1.378	Quarter-finals
2	Serbia	5	4	1	12	13	3	4.333	381	313	1.217	Quarter-finals
3	South Korea	5	3	2	7	9	10	0.900	374	415	0.901	Quarter-finals
4	Dominican Republic	5	2	3	8	10	10	1.000	411	406	1.012	Quarter-finals
5	Japan (H)	5	1	4	4	6	12	0.500	378	395	0.957	
6	Kenya	5	0	5	0	0	15	0.000	242	376	0.644	

Source: Tokyo 2020 and FIVB
Rules for classification: Tiebreakers
(H) Host

=== Pool B ===
Pos	Team	Pld	W	L	Pts	SW	SL	SR	SPW	SPL	SPR	Qualification
1	United States	5	4	1	10	12	7	1.714	418	401	1.042	Quarter-finals
2	Italy	5	3	2	10	11	7	1.571	409	377	1.085	Quarter-finals
3	Turkey	5	3	2	9	12	8	1.500	434	416	1.043	Quarter-finals
4	ROC	5	3	2	9	11	8	1.375	422	378	1.116	Quarter-finals
5	China	5	2	3	7	8	9	0.889	374	385	0.971	
6	Argentina	5	0	5	0	0	15	0.000	275	375	0.733	

Source: Tokyo 2020 and FIVB
Rules for classification: Tiebreakers

=== Knockout stage ===
Quarter-finals
4 August
Brazil	3
ROC	1
4 August
South Korea	3
Turkey	2
4 August
Dominican Republic	0
United States	3
4 August
Serbia	3
Italy	0

Semi-finals
6 August
Brazil	3
South Korea	0
6 August
Serbia	0
United States	3

Gold medal match
8 August
Brazil	0
United States	3
Bronze medal match
8 August
South Korea	0
Serbia	3

=== Final standings ===
Rank	Team
Gold medal	United States
Silver medal	Brazil
Bronze medal	Serbia
4	South Korea
5	Turkey
6	Italy
7	ROC
8	Dominican Republic
9	China
10	Japan
11	Argentina
12	Kenya

== Men's beach volleyball competition ==
=== Knockout stage ===
Round of 16
2 August
Semenov – Leshukov (ROC)	2
M. Grimalt – E. Grimalt (CHI)	0
1 August
Mol – Sørum (NOR)	2
Brouwer – Meeuwsen (NED)	0
2 August
Evandro – Schmidt (BRA)	0
Pļaviņš – Točs (LAT)	2
2 August
Gaxiola – Rubio (MEX)	0
Alison – Álvaro (BRA)	2
1 August
Cherif – Ahmed (QAT)	2
Lucena – Dalhausser (USA)	1
2 August
Fijałek – Bryl (POL)	0
Nicolai – Lupo (ITA)	2
2 August
Gibb – Bourne (USA)	1
Thole – Wickler (GER)	2
2 August
Herrera – Gavira (ESP)	0
Krasilnikov – Stoyanovskiy (ROC)	2

Quarter-finals
4 August
Semenov – Leshukov (ROC)	0
Mol – Sørum (NOR)	2
4 August
Pļaviņš – Točs (LAT)	2
Alison – Álvaro (BRA)	0
4 August
Cherif – Ahmed (QAT)	2
Nicolai – Lupo (ITA)	0
4 August
Thole – Wickler (GER)	0
Krasilnikov – Stoyanovskiy (ROC)	2

Semi-finals
5 August
Mol – Sørum (NOR)	2
Pļaviņš – Točs (LAT)	0
5 August
Cherif – Ahmed (QAT)	0
Krasilnikov – Stoyanovskiy (ROC)	2

Gold medal
7 August
Mol – Sørum (NOR)	2
Krasilnikov – Stoyanovskiy (ROC)	0
Bronze medal
7 August
Pļaviņš – Točs (LAT)	0
Cherif – Ahmed (QAT)	2

=== Final standings ===
Rank	Team
Gold medal	Mol – Sørum (NOR)
Silver medal	Krasilnikov – Stoyanovskiy (ROC)
Bronze medal	Cherif – Ahmed (QAT)
4	Pļaviņš – Točs (LAT)
5	Alison – Álvaro (BRA)
5	Thole – Wickler (GER)
5	Nicolai – Lupo (ITA)
5	Semenov – Leshukov (ROC)
9	Evandro – Schmidt (BRA)
9	M. Grimalt – E. Grimalt (CHI)
9	Gaxiola – Rubio (MEX)
9	Brouwer – Meeuwsen (NED)
9	Fijałek – Bryl (POL)
9	Herrera – Gavira (ESP)
9	Gibb – Bourne (USA)
9	Lucena – Dalhausser (USA)
17	Kantor – Łosiak (POL)
17	Heidrich – Gerson (SUI)
19	Azaad – Capogrosso (ARG)
19	McHugh – Schumann (AUS)
19	Perušič – Schweiner (CZE)
19	Carambula – Rossi (ITA)
19	Ishijima – Shiratori (JPN)
19	El Graoui – Abicha (MAR)

== Women's beach volleyball competition ==
=== Knockout stage ===
Round of 16
2 August
Pavan – Humana-Paredes (CAN)	2
Liliana – Baquerizo (ESP)	0
1 August
Clancy – Artacho del Solar (AUS)	2
Xue – Wang X (CHN)	0
1 August
Makroguzova – Kholomina (ROC)	1
Kravčenoka – Graudiņa (LAT)	2
1 August
Bansley – Wilkerson (CAN)	2
Claes – Sponcil (USA)	1
1 August
Wang F – Xia (CHN)	0
Ana Patrícia – Rebecca (BRA)	2
1 August
Heidrich – Vergé-Dépré (SUI)	2
Hüberli – Betschart (SUI)	1
1 August
Kozuch – Ludwig (GER)	2
Ágatha – Duda (BRA)	1
2 August
Lidy – Leila (CUB)	0
Ross – Klineman (USA)	2

Quarter-finals
3 August
Pavan – Humana-Paredes (CAN)	1
Clancy – Artacho del Solar (AUS)	2
3 August
Kravčenoka – Graudiņa (LAT)	2
Bansley – Wilkerson (CAN)	1
3 August
Ana Patrícia – Rebecca (BRA)	1
Heidrich – Vergé-Dépré (SUI)	2
3 August
Kozuch – Ludwig (GER)	0
Ross – Klineman (USA)	2

Semi-finals
5 August
Clancy – Artacho del Solar (AUS)	2
Kravčenoka – Graudiņa (LAT)	0
5 August
Heidrich – Vergé-Dépré (SUI)	0
Ross – Klineman (USA)	2

Gold medal
6 August
Clancy – Artacho del Solar (AUS)	0
Ross – Klineman (USA)	2
Bronze medal
6 August
Kravčenoka – Graudiņa (LAT)	0
Heidrich – Vergé-Dépré (SUI)	2

=== Final standings ===
Rank	Team
Gold medal	Ross – Klineman (USA)
Silver medal	Clancy – Artacho del Solar (AUS)
Bronze medal	Heidrich – Vergé-Dépré (SUI)
4	Kravčenoka – Graudiņa (LAT)
5	Ana Patrícia – Rebecca (BRA)
5	Bansley – Wilkerson (CAN)
5	Pavan – Humana-Paredes (CAN)
5	Kozuch – Ludwig (GER)
9	Ágatha – Duda (BRA)
9	Wang F – Xia (CHN)
9	Xue – Wang X (CHN)
9	Lidy – Leila (CUB)
9	Makroguzova – Kholomina (ROC)
9	Hüberli – Betschart (SUI)
9	Liliana – Baquerizo (ESP)
9	Claes – Sponcil (USA)
17	Ishii – Murakami (JPN)
17	Stam – Schoon (NED)
19	Gallay – Pereyra (ARG)
19	Hermannová – Sluková (CZE)
19	Sude – Borger (GER)
19	Menegatti – Orsi Toth (ITA)
19	Makokha – Khadambi (KEN)
19	Keizer – Meppelink (NED)

== See also ==
- Volleyball at the 2018 Asian Games
- Volleyball at the 2019 Pan American Games
- Sitting volleyball at the 2020 Summer Paralympics
