= Volleyball at the 2020 Summer Olympics – Women's qualification =

The qualification for the 2020 women's Olympic volleyball tournament allocated twelve teams quota spots: the host, the winners of each of six Intercontinental Qualifying Tournaments, and five continental Olympic qualification tournament champions. Teams already qualified for the event were not eligible to play in the following qualification tournaments. The 2020 Summer Olympics were postponed to 2021 due to the COVID-19 pandemic.

== Qualification summary ==
Event		Dates	Venue(s)	Quota	Qualifier(s)
Host nation		—N/a		1	Japan
Intercontinental Qualifier	Pool A	1–4 August 2019	(Poland) Wrocław	1	Serbia
Intercontinental Qualifier	Pool B	1–4 August 2019	(China) Ningbo	1	China
Intercontinental Qualifier	Pool C	1–4 August 2019	(United States) Bossier City	1	United States
Intercontinental Qualifier	Pool D	1–4 August 2019	(Brazil) Uberlândia	1	Brazil
Intercontinental Qualifier	Pool E	1–4 August 2019	(Russia) Kaliningrad	1	ROC
Intercontinental Qualifier	Pool F	1–4 August 2019	(Italy) Catania	1	Italy
African Qualifier		5–9 January 2020	(Cameroon) Yaoundé	1	Kenya
South American Qualifier		7–9 January 2020	(Colombia) Bogotá	1	Argentina
Asian Qualifier		7–12 January 2020	(Thailand) Nakhon Ratchasima	1	South Korea
European Qualifier		7–12 January 2020	(Netherlands) Apeldoorn	1	Turkey
North American Qualifier		10–12 January 2020	(Dominican Republic) Santo Domingo	1	Dominican Republic
Total				12	

== Timeline ==
Confederation	Tournament		Dates	Venue	Teams
FIVB (Intercontinental)	FIVB Tokyo Volleyball Qualification	Pool A	2–4 August 2019	(Poland) Wrocław	4
FIVB (Intercontinental)	FIVB Tokyo Volleyball Qualification	Pool B	2–4 August 2019	(China) Ningbo	4
FIVB (Intercontinental)	FIVB Tokyo Volleyball Qualification	Pool C	2–4 August 2019	(United States) Bossier City	4
FIVB (Intercontinental)	FIVB Tokyo Volleyball Qualification	Pool D	1–3 August 2019	(Brazil) Uberlândia	4
FIVB (Intercontinental)	FIVB Tokyo Volleyball Qualification	Pool E	2–4 August 2019	(Russia) Kaliningrad	4
FIVB (Intercontinental)	FIVB Tokyo Volleyball Qualification	Pool F	2–4 August 2019	(Italy) Catania	4
CAVB (Africa)	CAVB Tokyo Volleyball Qualification		5–9 January 2020	(Cameroon) Yaoundé	5
AVC (Asia and Oceania)	Asian Championship		17–25 August 2019	(South Korea) Seoul	11+2
AVC (Asia and Oceania)	AVC Tokyo Volleyball Qualification		7–12 January 2020	(Thailand) Nakhon Ratchasima	7
CEV (Europe)	CEV Tokyo Volleyball Qualification		7–12 January 2020	(Netherlands) Apeldoorn	8
NORCECA (North America)	NORCECA Champions Cup		22–24 August 2019	(United States) Colorado Springs	4
NORCECA (North America)	NORCECA Championship		8–13 October 2019	(Puerto Rico) San Juan	8
NORCECA (North America)	NORCECA Tokyo Volleyball Qualification		10–12 January 2020	(Dominican Republic) Santo Domingo	4
CSV (South America)	South American Championship		28 August–1 September 2019	(Peru) Cajamarca	8
CSV (South America)	CSV Tokyo Volleyball Qualification		7–9 January 2020	(Colombia) Bogotá	4

== Pool standing procedure ==
For all qualification tournaments except North American qualification tournament

1. Total number of victories (matches won, matches lost)
2. In the event of a tie, the following first tiebreaker will apply: The teams will be ranked by the most point gained per match as follows:
  - Match won 3–0 or 3–1: 3 points for the winner, 0 points for the loser
  - Match won 3–2: 2 points for the winner, 1 point for the loser
  - Match forfeited: 3 points for the winner, 0 points (0–25, 0–25, 0–25) for the loser
3. If teams are still tied after examining the number of victories and points gained, then the FIVB will examine the results in order to break the tie in the following order:
  - Set quotient: if two or more teams are tied on the number of points gained, they will be ranked by the quotient resulting from the division of the number of all set won by the number of all sets lost.
  - Points quotient: if the tie persists based on the set quotient, the teams will be ranked by the quotient resulting from the division of all points scored by the total of points lost during all sets.
  - If the tie persists based on the point quotient, the tie will be broken based on the team that won the match of the Round Robin Phase between the tied teams. When the tie in point quotient is between three or more teams, these teams ranked taking into consideration only the matches involving the teams in question.

For North American qualification tournament only

1. Number of matches won
2. Match points
3. Points ratio
4. Sets ratio
5. Result of the last match between the tied teams

Match won 3–0: 5 match points for the winner, 0 match points for the loser
Match won 3–1: 4 match points for the winner, 1 match point for the loser
Match won 3–2: 3 match points for the winner, 2 match points for the loser

== Host country ==
FIVB reserved a vacancy for the 2020 Olympic Games host country to participate in the tournament.

- Japan

== Intercontinental Olympic Qualification Tournaments ==
- The winners in each pool will qualify for the 2020 Olympic Games.

=== Qualification round ===
Twenty-four teams qualified for the competition as the top twenty-four teams of FIVB World Rankings on 1 January 2019 (except Japan who qualified as host.).

Qualified to 2019 FIVB IOQT
Qualified but withdrew
2020 Summer Olympics host country

Seeding	Team	WC 2015	OG 2016	WGP 2017	WCH 2018	Total
1	Serbia	90	90	42	100	322
2	China	100	100	40	80	320
3	United States	80	80	38	58	256
4	Brazil	50	50	50	50	200
5	Russia	70	50	28	50	198
–	Japan	50	50	32	58	190
6	Netherlands	0	70	38	70	178
7	Italy	0	30	45	90	165
8	South Korea	40	50	18	30	138
9	Dominican Republic	30	3	30	45	108
10	Argentina	25	30	8	30	93
11	Turkey	0	3	24	45	72
12	Puerto Rico	0	20	14	36	70
13	Thailand	0	3	26	36	65
14	Germany	0	2	17	40	59
15	Bulgaria	0	0	15	40	55
16	Cameroon	0	20	2	25	47
17	Canada	0	2	12	30	44
18	Belgium	0	2	22	18	42
19	Kenya	5	0	2	30	37
20	Mexico	0	0	2	33	35
21	Azerbaijan	0	0	0	33	33
22	Kazakhstan	0	1	6	25	32
23	Czech Republic	0	0	16	15	31
–	Cuba	5	0	0	25	30
24	Poland	0	1	20	8	29

=== Qualified teams ===
Teams were seeded following the serpentine system according to their FIVB World Ranking as of 1 January 2019. Rankings are shown in brackets.

Pool A	Pool B	Pool C	Pool D	Pool E	Pool F
**Serbia** (1)	**China** (2) **(H)**	**United States** (3) **(H)**	**Brazil** (4) **(H)**	**Russia** (5) **(H)**	Netherlands (7)
Puerto Rico (13)	Turkey (12)	Argentina (11)	Dominican Republic (10)	South Korea (9)	**Italy** (8) **(H)**
Thailand (14)	Germany (15)	Bulgaria (16)	Cameroon (17)	Canada (18)	Belgium (19)
Poland (26) **(H)**	Czech Republic (24)	Kazakhstan (23)	Azerbaijan (22)	Mexico (21)	Kenya (20)

Notes

- Teams in **bold** qualified for the final tournament.
- (H): Qualification group hosts

=== Final round ===
==== Means of qualification ====
Qualified for the 2020 Olympic Games

==== Pool A ====
Pos	Team	Pld	Pts
1	Serbia (Q)	3	9
2	Poland (H)	3	5
3	Thailand	3	4
4	Puerto Rico	3	0

Source: FIVB
(H) Host; (Q) Qualified for the phase indicated

==== Pool B ====
Pos	Team	Pld	Pts
1	China (H, Q)	3	9
2	Turkey	3	6
3	Germany	3	3
4	Czech Republic	3	0

Source: FIVB
(H) Host; (Q) Qualified for the phase indicated

==== Pool C ====
Pos	Team	Pld	Pts
1	United States (H, Q)	3	8
2	Bulgaria	3	7
3	Argentina	3	3
4	Kazakhstan	3	0

Source: FIVB
(H) Host; (Q) Qualified for the phase indicated

==== Pool D ====
Pos	Team	Pld	Pts
1	Brazil (H, Q)	3	7
2	Dominican Republic	3	7
3	Azerbaijan	3	4
4	Cameroon	3	0

Source: FIVB
(H) Host; (Q) Qualified for the phase indicated

==== Pool E ====
Pos	Team	Pld	Pts
1	Russia (H, Q)	3	8
2	South Korea	3	7
3	Canada	3	3
4	Mexico	3	0

Source: FIVB
(H) Host; (Q) Qualified for the phase indicated

==== Pool F ====
Pos	Team	Pld	Pts
1	Italy (H, Q)	3	9
2	Netherlands	3	6
3	Belgium	3	3
4	Kenya	3	0

Source: FIVB
(H) Host; (Q) Qualified for the phase indicated

== Continental Olympic Qualification Tournaments ==
=== Africa ===
Of the 5 entered teams, only winner of this round was qualified to the 2020 Olympics.

==== Means of qualification ====
Qualified for the 2020 Olympic Games

==== Round robin ====
Pos	Team	Pld	Pts
1	Kenya (Q)	4	11
2	Cameroon (H)	4	10
3	Egypt	4	6
4	Nigeria	4	3
5	Botswana	4	0

Source: FIVB
(H) Host; (Q) Qualified for the phase indicated

=== Asia and Oceania ===
- The winners in final round will qualify for the 2020 Olympic Games.

==== Qualified teams ====
Of the 61 AVC and IOC member associations, a total of 13 AVC member national teams entered the qualifying stage

Qualification round

Pool A	Pool B
**South Korea** **(H)**	Japan
**Iran**	**Kazakhstan**
Hong Kong	**Australia**
	**India**
Pool C	Pool D
**Thailand**	China
**Chinese Taipei**	Sri Lanka
New Zealand	**Indonesia**

Final round

Pool A	Pool B
Thailand **(H)**	South Korea
Chinese Taipei	Kazakhstan
Australia	Iran
	Indonesia

Notes

- Teams in **bold** qualified for the next phase and final tournament.
- (H): Qualification group hosts

==== Qualification round ====
Of the 13 qualified teams, top eight teams (excluding Japan, and 2019 IOQT pool B winners China) will be qualified to the next round.

==== Means of qualification ====
Qualified for the Asian Olympic Qualification Tournament
Qualified for the Asian Olympic Qualification Tournament playoffs

==== Pool A ====
Pos	Team	Pld	Pts
1	South Korea (H, Q)	2	6
2	Iran (Q)	2	3
3	Hong Kong	2	0

Source: AVC
(H) Host; (Q) Qualified for the phase indicated

==== Pool B ====
Pos	Team	Pld	Pts
1	Japan	3	9
2	Kazakhstan (Q)	3	6
3	Australia	3	3
4	India	3	0

Source: AVC
(Q) Qualified for the phase indicated

==== Pool C ====
Pos	Team	Pld	Pts
1	Thailand (Q)	2	6
2	Chinese Taipei (Q)	2	3
3	New Zealand	2	0

Source: AVC
(Q) Qualified for the phase indicated

==== Pool D ====
Pos	Team	Pld	Pts
1	China	2	6
2	Indonesia (Q)	2	3
3	Sri Lanka	2	0

Source: AVC
(Q) Qualified for the phase indicated

==== Pool G ====
Pos	Team	Pld	Pts
1	Hong Kong	1	3
2	New Zealand	1	0

Source: AVC

==== Pool H ====
Pos	Team	Pld	Pts
1	Australia	2	6
2	India	2	2
3	Sri Lanka	2	1

Source: AVC

==== 9th–12th Classification round ====
Ninth place playoffs
24 August
Hong Kong	0
**India (Q)**	**3**
24 August
**Australia (Q)**	**3**
New Zealand	2

Ninth place
25 August
India	2
**Australia**	**3**
Eleventh place
25 August
**Hong Kong**	**3**
New Zealand	1

==== Final round ====
Of the 8 qualified teams, only winner of this round will be qualified to the 2020 Olympics.

==== Means of qualification ====
Qualified for the Asian Olympic Qualification Tournament semifinals

==== Pool A ====
Pos	Team	Pld	Pts
1	Thailand (H)	2	6
2	Chinese Taipei	2	3
3	Australia	2	0

Source: AVC
(H) Host

==== Pool B ====
Pos	Team	Pld	Pts
1	South Korea	3	9
2	Kazakhstan	3	6
3	Indonesia	3	2
4	Iran	3	1

Source: AVC

==== Final four ====
Semi-finals
11 January
**South Korea**	**3**
Chinese Taipei	1
11 January
**Thailand**	**3**
Kazakhstan	1

Final
12 January
South Korea **(Q)**	**3**
Thailand	0
Third place
12 January
Chinese Taipei	1
**Kazakhstan**	**3**

=== Europe ===
- The winners in final round will qualify for the 2020 Olympic Games.

==== Qualification round ====
Eight teams qualified for the competition as the top eight teams of CEV European Rankings on 1 October 2019 (except Serbia, Russia and Italy who qualified as Intercontinental Qualifier winners).

Qualified to 2019 CEV COQT
Qualified as Intercontinental Qualifier winners

Seeding	Team	ECH 2019	ECH 2017	WCH 2018	WGP 2017	Total
–	Serbia	100	100	50	48	298
–	Italy	96	92	48	50	286
1	Netherlands	92	98	46	46	282
2	Turkey	98	96	42	42	278
–	Russia	88	90	44	44	266
3	Germany	90	86	40	36	252
4	Bulgaria	86	84	40	32	242
5	Poland	94	82	26	38	240
6	Belgium	84	74	34	40	232
7	Croatia	80	80	24	30	214
8	Azerbaijan	82	94	36	0	212

==== Final round ====
Of the 8 qualified teams, only winner of this round will be qualified to the 2020 Olympics.

==== Means of qualification ====
Qualified for the European Olympic Qualification Tournament semifinals

==== Pool A ====
Pos	Team	Pld	Pts
1	Poland	3	9
2	Netherlands (H)	3	6
3	Bulgaria	3	3
4	Azerbaijan	3	0

Source: FIVB
(H) Host

==== Pool B ====
Pos	Team	Pld	Pts
1	Germany	3	9
2	Turkey	3	5
3	Belgium	3	4
4	Croatia	3	0

Source: FIVB

==== Final four ====
Semi-finals
11 January
Poland	2
**Turkey**	**3**
11 January
**Germany**	**3**
Netherlands	0

Final
12 January
**Turkey (Q)**	**3**
Germany	0

=== North America ===
- The winners in final round will qualify for the 2020 Summer Olympics.

==== Qualified teams ====
Of the 35 NORCECA and IOC member associations, a total of 8 NORCECA member national teams entered the qualifying stage.

Qualification round – NORCECA Champions Cup

Round robin
United States **(H)**
**Dominican Republic**
Puerto Rico
Canada

Qualification round – NORCECA Championship

Pool A	Pool B
**Puerto Rico** **(H)**	United States
**Canada**	Dominican Republic
Cuba	**Mexico**
Costa Rica	Trinidad and Tobago

Final round

Round robin
Dominican Republic **(H)**
Canada
Puerto Rico
Mexico

Notes

- Teams in **bold** qualified for the next phase and final tournament.
- (H): Qualification group hosts

==== Qualification round ====
The 2019 NORCECA Champions Cup champions and the top three teams from the 2019 NORCECA Championship which had not yet qualified to the 2020 Summer Olympics will compete in the North American Olympic Qualification Tournament.

==== Means of qualification ====
Qualified for the North American Olympic Qualification Tournament
Qualified for the North American Olympic Qualification Tournament playoffs

==== NORCECA Champions Cup – Round robin ====
Pos	Team	Pld	Pts
1	United States **(H)**	3	13
2	Dominican Republic **(Q)**	3	8
3	Canada	3	6
4	Puerto Rico	3	3

Source: NORCECA
**(H)** Host; **(Q)** Qualified to the phase indicated.

==== NORCECA Championship – Pool A ====
Pos	Team	Pld	Pts
1	Puerto Rico **(H, Q)**	3	15
2	Canada	3	9
3	Cuba	3	6
4	Costa Rica	3	0

Source: NORCECA
**(H)** Host; **(Q)** Qualified to the phase indicated.

==== NORCECA Championship – Pool B ====
Pos	Team	Pld	Pts
1	United States	3	15
2	Dominican Republic	3	10
3	Mexico	3	5
4	Trinidad and Tobago	3	0

Source: NORCECA

==== NORCECA Championship – Final round ====
Quarterfinals
11 October
**Dominican Republic**	**3**
Cuba	0
11 October
**Canada (Q)**	**3**
Mexico	1

Semifinals
12 October
Puerto Rico	2
**Dominican Republic**	**3**
12 October
**United States**	**3**
Canada	0

Final
13 October
**Dominican Republic**	**3**
United States	2
3rd place match
13 October
Puerto Rico	0
**Canada**	**3**

5th place match
13 October
Cuba	1
**Mexico (Q)**	**3**

==== Final round ====
Of the 4 qualified teams, only winner of this round will be qualified to the 2020 Olympics.

==== Means of qualification ====
Qualified for the 2020 Olympic Games

==== Round robin ====
Pos	Team	Pld	Pts
1	Dominican Republic **(H, Q)**	3	12
2	Puerto Rico	3	8
3	Canada	3	7
4	Mexico	3	3

Source: FIVB
(H) Host. (Q) Qualified to the phase indicated.

=== South America ===
- The winners in final round will qualify for the 2020 Olympic Games.

==== Qualified teams ====
Of the 11 CSV and IOC member associations, a total of 8 CSV member national teams entered the qualifying stage

Qualification round

Pool A	Pool B
Brazil	**Peru** **(H)**
**Argentina**	**Colombia**
**Venezuela**	Bolivia
Ecuador	Uruguay

Final round

Round robin
Colombia **(H)**
Argentina
Peru
Venezuela

Notes

- Teams in **bold** qualified for the next phase and final tournament.
- (H): Qualification group hosts

==== Qualification round ====
The top four teams from the 2019 South American Championship which had not yet qualified to the 2020 Olympic Games will compete in the South American Olympic Qualification Tournament.

==== Means of qualification ====
Qualified for the South American Olympic Qualification Tournament
Qualified for the South American Olympic Qualification Tournament playoffs

==== Pool A ====
Pos	Team	Pld	Pts
1	Brazil	3	9
2	Argentina (Q)	3	6
3	Venezuela	3	2
4	Ecuador	3	1

Source: CSV
(Q) Qualified for the phase indicated

==== Pool B ====
Pos	Team	Pld	Pts
1	Colombia (Q)	3	8
2	Peru (Q)	3	7
3	Bolivia	3	3
4	Uruguay	3	0

Source: CSV
(Q) Qualified for the phase indicated

==== 5th–8th Classification round ====
5th–8th semifinals
31 Aug
**Venezuela**	**3**
Uruguay	0
31 Aug
**Bolivia**	**3**
Ecuador	0

5th place match
1 Sept
**Venezuela (Q)**	**3**
Bolivia	0

==== Final round ====
Of the 4 qualified teams, only winner of this round will be qualified to the 2020 Olympics.

==== Means of qualification ====
Qualified for the 2020 Olympic Games

==== Round robin ====
Pos	Team	Pld	Pts
1	Argentina (Q)	3	9
2	Colombia (H)	3	6
3	Venezuela	3	3
4	Peru	3	0

Source: FIVB
(H) Host; (Q) Qualified for the phase indicated
