= Meryem Boz =

Turkish volleyball player (born 1988)

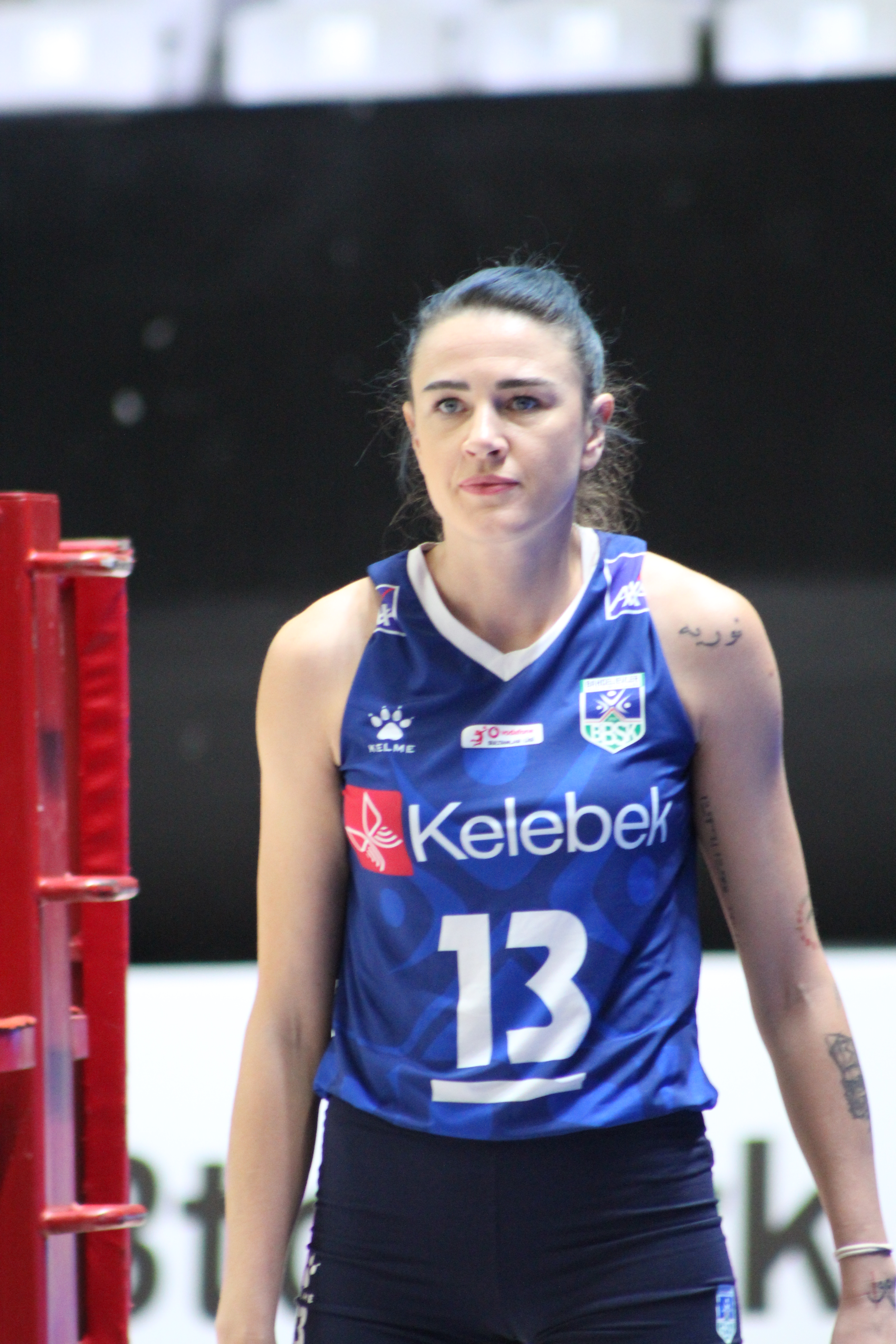
- Meryem Boz in 2024

Personal information
- Nickname: Blue Lightning
- Nationality: Turkish
- Born: 3 February 1988 (age 38); Eskişehir, Turkey
- Height: 194 cm (6 ft 4 in)
- Weight: 63 kg (139 lb)
- Spike: 323 cm (127 in)
- Block: 315 cm (124 in)

Volleyball information
- Position: Opposite
- Current club: Sarıyer Belediyesi
- Number: 13

Career
Years	Teams
2001–2002; 2002–2010; 2010–2011; 2011–2012; 2012–2013; 2013–2014; 2014–2015; 2015–2016; 2016–2018; 2018–2019; 2019-2021; 2021-2022; 2022-2024; 2024; 2024-2025	Eskişehir DSİ Bentspor; İller Bankası; Atom Trefl Sopot; İller Bankası; Fenerbahçe; Nakhonnon; Bursa BBSK; Nilüfer Belediyespor; Seramiksan; Galatasaray; Aydın Büyükşehir Belediyespor; VakıfBank S.K. Fenerbahçe S.K. Bahçelievler Belediyespor; Sarıyer Belediyesi

National team
2008–	Turkey
Honours
Women's volleyball
Representing Turkey
European Championship
Silver medal – second place	2019 Turkey	Team
Bronze medal – third place	2021 Serbia/Bulgaria/Croatia/Romania	Team
Bronze medal – third place	2017 Azerbaijan/Georgia	Team
FIVB Nations League
Silver medal – second place	2018 Nanjing	Team
Bronze medal – third place	2021 Rimini	Team
Women's European Volleyball League
Silver medal – second place	2015 Hungary	Team
Bronze medal – third place	2010 Ankara/Turkey	Team

Meryem Boz (born 3 February 1988) is a Turkish volleyball player. She is 194 cm (6 ft 4 in) and plays as an opposite for Sarıyer Belediyesi. She was chosen MVP of the CEV Tokyo Volleyball European Qualification 2020.

== Career ==
Boz played for Fenerbahçe in the 2012 FIVB Club World Championship held in Doha, Qatar and helped her team win the bronze medal after defeating Puerto Rico's Lancheras de Cataño 3–0. She also won Challenge Cup with Bursa BBSK in 2015. For the 2016/17 season, she played for the Turkish club Seramiksan. She will be playing as opposite spiker for Fenerbahçe in the 2022/23 season.

== Awards ==
=== Individuals ===
- 2014–15 CEV Women's Challenge Cup "MVP"
- 2020 CEV Tokyo qualification "MVP"

=== National team ===
- 2010 European League – Bronze Medal
- 2015 European League – Silver Medal
- 2017 European Championship - Bronze Medal
- 2018 Nations League - Silver Medal
- 2019 European Championship - Silver Medal
- 2021 Nations League - Bronze Medal
- 2021 European Championship - Bronze Medal

=== Clubs ===
- 2010–11 Polish Championship – Runner-Up, with Atom Trefl Sopot
- 2012 FIVB Women's Club World Championship – Bronze Medal, with Fenerbahçe
- 2012–13 Women's CEV Cup - Runner-Up, with Fenerbahçe
- 2014–15 CEV Women's Challenge Cup - Champion, with Bursa BBSK
- 2021 FIVB Women's Club World Championship - Champion, with VakıfBank S.K.
- 2021–22 CEV Women's Champions League - Champion, with VakıfBank S.K.
- 2021–22 Turkish Super Cup - Champion, with Fenerbahçe Beko
- 2022–23 Turkish Volleyball League Champion, with Fenerbahçe Opet
- 2023–24 Turkish Volleyball Cup Champion, with Fenerbahçe Opet
- 2023–24 Turkish Volleyball League Champion, with Fenerbahçe Opet

== See also ==
- Turkish women in sports
