= 2019 Women's NORCECA Volleyball Championship =

2019 Women's NORCECA Championship
Tournament details
- Host country: Puerto Rico
- Dates: 8–13 October
- Teams: 8
- Venue: 1 (in 1 host city)

Final positions
- Champions: Dominican Republic (2nd title)
- Runners-up: United States
- Third place: Canada

Tournament awards
- MVP: (Dominican Republic) Brayelin Martínez

The 2019 Women's NORCECA Volleyball Championship was the 26th edition of the tournament, and was played from 8 October to 13 October 2019 in San Juan, Puerto Rico. The Dominican Republic defeated the United States by 3–2 to win the Continental Championship. Puerto Rico, Canada, Mexico, and the Dominican Republic qualified for the NORCECA Olympic Qualifier, which will see the four teams compete for a spot in the 2020 Olympics. Dominican Brayelin Martínez earned the Most Valuable Player award.

== Competing nations ==
The following national teams have qualified:

| Pool A | Pool B |
|---|---|
| Puerto Rico | United States |
| Canada | Dominican Republic |
| Cuba | Mexico |
| Costa Rica | Trinidad and Tobago |

== Pool standing procedure ==
1. Number of matches won
2. Match points
3. Points ratio
4. Sets ratio
5. Result of the last match between the tied teams

Match won 3–0: 5 match points for the winner, 0 match points for the loser
Match won 3–1: 4 match points for the winner, 1 match point for the loser
Match won 3–2: 3 match points for the winner, 2 match points for the loser

== Preliminary round ==
=== Pool A ===
| Pos | Team | Pld | W | L | Pts | SPW | SPL | SPR | SW | SL | SR | Qualification |
|---|---|---|---|---|---|---|---|---|---|---|---|---|
| 1 | Puerto Rico | 3 | 3 | 0 | 15 | 225 | 140 | 1.607 | 9 | 0 | MAX | Semifinals |
| 2 | Canada | 3 | 2 | 1 | 9 | 235 | 188 | 1.250 | 6 | 4 | 1.500 | Quarterfinals |
| 3 | Cuba | 3 | 1 | 2 | 6 | 189 | 220 | 0.859 | 4 | 6 | 0.667 | Quarterfinals |
| 4 | Costa Rica | 3 | 0 | 3 | 0 | 124 | 225 | 0.551 | 0 | 9 | 0.000 | 5th – 8th classification |

| Date | Time | | Score | | Set 1 | Set 2 | Set 3 | Set 4 | Set 5 | Total | Report |
|---|---|---|---|---|---|---|---|---|---|---|---|
| 8 out | 14:00 | Canada | 3–1 | Cuba | 25–16 | 22–25 | 25–17 | 25–14 | | 97–72 | P2P3 |
| 8 out | 20:15 | Puerto Rico | 3–0 | Costa Rica | 25–8 | 25–14 | 25–13 | | | 75–35 | P2P3 |
| 9 out | 14:00 | Canada | 3–0 | Costa Rica | 25–20 | 25–8 | 25–13 | | | 75–41 | P2P3 |
| 9 out | 20:15 | Puerto Rico | 3–0 | Cuba | 25–15 | 25–9 | 25–18 | | | 75–42 | P2P3 |
| 10 out | 14:00 | Costa Rica | 0–3 | Cuba | 17–25 | 15–25 | 16–25 | | | 48–75 | P2P3 |
| 10 out | 20:15 | Puerto Rico | 3–0 | Canada | 25–23 | 25–22 | 25–18 | | | 75–63 | P2P3 |

=== Pool B ===
| Pos | Team | Pld | W | L | Pts | SPW | SPL | SPR | SW | SL | SR | Qualification |
|---|---|---|---|---|---|---|---|---|---|---|---|---|
| 1 | United States | 3 | 3 | 0 | 15 | 227 | 115 | 1.974 | 9 | 0 | MAX | Semifinals |
| 2 | Dominican Republic | 3 | 2 | 1 | 10 | 207 | 155 | 1.335 | 6 | 3 | 2.000 | Quarterfinals |
| 3 | Mexico | 3 | 1 | 2 | 5 | 161 | 182 | 0.885 | 3 | 6 | 0.500 | Quarterfinals |
| 4 | Trinidad and Tobago | 3 | 0 | 3 | 0 | 82 | 225 | 0.364 | 0 | 9 | 0.000 | 5th – 8th classification |

| Date | Time | | Score | | Set 1 | Set 2 | Set 3 | Set 4 | Set 5 | Total | Report |
|---|---|---|---|---|---|---|---|---|---|---|---|
| 8 out | 16:00 | United States | 3–0 | Trinidad and Tobago | 25–8 | 25–7 | 25–7 | | | 75–22 | P2P3 |
| 8 out | 18:00 | Dominican Republic | 3–0 | Mexico | 26–24 | 25–11 | 25–14 | | | 76–49 | P2P3 |
| 9 out | 16:00 | Dominican Republic | 3–0 | Trinidad and Tobago | 25–7 | 25–13 | 25–9 | | | 75–29 | P2P3 |
| 9 out | 18:00 | United States | 3–0 | Mexico | 25–8 | 25–15 | 25–14 | | | 75–37 | P2P3 |
| 10 out | 16:00 | Mexico | 3–0 | Trinidad and Tobago | 25–14 | 25–7 | 25–10 | | | 75–31 | P2P3 |
| 10 out | 18:00 | United States | 3–0 | Dominican Republic | 27–25 | 25–17 | 25–14 | | | 77–56 | P2P3 |

== Final round ==
Quarterfinals
11 October
Dominican Republic | 3
Cuba | 0
11 October
Canada | 3
Mexico | 1

Semifinals
12 October
Puerto Rico | 2
Dominican Republic | 3
12 October
United States | 3
Canada | 0

Final
13 October
Dominican Republic | 3
United States | 2
3rd place
13 October
Puerto Rico | 0
Canada | 3

5th–8th semifinals
12 October
Costa Rica | 0
Mexico | 3
12 October
Trinidad and Tobago | 0
Cuba | 3

5th place
13 October
Mexico | 3
Cuba | 1
7th place
13 October
Costa Rica | 3
Trinidad and Tobago | 0

=== Quarterfinals ===
| Date | Time | | Score | | Set 1 | Set 2 | Set 3 | Set 4 | Set 5 | Total | Report |
|---|---|---|---|---|---|---|---|---|---|---|---|
| 11 out | 18:00 | Dominican Republic | 3–0 | Cuba | 25–18 | 25–11 | 25–20 | | | 75–49 | P2P3 |
| 11 out | 20:15 | Canada | 3–1 | Mexico | 25–20 | 29–31 | 25–17 | 25–20 | | 104–88 | P2P3 |

=== Classification 5th–8th places ===
| Date | Time | | Score | | Set 1 | Set 2 | Set 3 | Set 4 | Set 5 | Total | Report |
|---|---|---|---|---|---|---|---|---|---|---|---|
| 12 out | 14:00 | Costa Rica | 0–3 | Mexico | 14–25 | 11–25 | 17–25 | | | 42–75 | P2P3 |
| 12 out | 16:00 | Trinidad and Tobago | 0–3 | Cuba | 18–25 | 20–25 | 9–25 | | | 47–75 | P2P3 |

=== Semifinals ===
| Date | Time | | Score | | Set 1 | Set 2 | Set 3 | Set 4 | Set 5 | Total | Report |
|---|---|---|---|---|---|---|---|---|---|---|---|
| 12 out | 18:00 | United States | 3–0 | Canada | 25–17 | 25–16 | 25–18 | | | 75–51 | P2P3 |
| 12 out | 20:15 | Puerto Rico | 2–3 | Dominican Republic | 25–19 | 14–25 | 24–26 | 25–21 | 8–15 | 96–106 | P2P3 |

=== Seventh place match ===
| Date | Time | | Score | | Set 1 | Set 2 | Set 3 | Set 4 | Set 5 | Total | Report |
|---|---|---|---|---|---|---|---|---|---|---|---|
| 13 out | 11:00 | Costa Rica | 3–0 | Trinidad and Tobago | 25–19 | 25–21 | 25–19 | | | 75–59 | P2P3 |

=== Fifth place match ===
| Date | Time | | Score | | Set 1 | Set 2 | Set 3 | Set 4 | Set 5 | Total | Report |
|---|---|---|---|---|---|---|---|---|---|---|---|
| 13 out | 13:00 | Mexico | 3–1 | Cuba | 25–20 | 25–20 | 17–25 | 25–22 | | 92–87 | P2P3 |

=== Bronze medal match ===
| Date | Time | | Score | | Set 1 | Set 2 | Set 3 | Set 4 | Set 5 | Total | Report |
|---|---|---|---|---|---|---|---|---|---|---|---|
| 13 out | 15:00 | Puerto Rico | 0–3 | Canada | 24–26 | 13–25 | 20–25 | | | 57–76 | P2P3 |

=== Final ===
| Date | Time | | Score | | Set 1 | Set 2 | Set 3 | Set 4 | Set 5 | Total | Report |
|---|---|---|---|---|---|---|---|---|---|---|---|
| 13 out | 17:15 | Dominican Republic | 3–2 | United States | 25–19 | 25–23 | 15–25 | 20–25 | 15–9 | 100–101 | P2P3 |

== Final standing ==
| Rank | Team |
|---|---|
| 1st place, gold medalist(s) | Dominican Republic |
| 2nd place, silver medalist(s) | United States |
| 3rd place, bronze medalist(s) | Canada |
| 4 | Puerto Rico |
| 5 | Mexico |
| 6 | Cuba |
| 7 | Costa Rica |
| 8 | Trinidad and Tobago |

| Already qualified for the NORCECA Olympic Qualifier |
| Already qualified for the 2020 Olympics |
| Qualified for the NORCECA Olympic Qualifier |

2019 Women's NORCECA champions

Dominican Republic
2nd title

== All-Star team ==
- Most valuable player
  - Brayelin Martínez (DOM)
- Best spikers
  - Kimberly Hill (USA)
  - Alexa Gray (CAN)
- Best middle blockers
  - Neira Ortiz (PUR)
  - Tori Dixon (USA)
- Best setter
  - Jordyn Poulter (USA)
- Best Opposite
  - Karsta Lowe (USA)
- Best scorer
  - Andrea Rangel (MEX)
- Best server
  - Bethania de la Cruz (DOM)
- Best libero
  - María José Castro (CRC)
- Best digger
  - Justine Wong (USA)
- Best receiver
  - Shara Venegas (PUR)
