= Mina Popović =

Serbian volleyball player (born 1994)

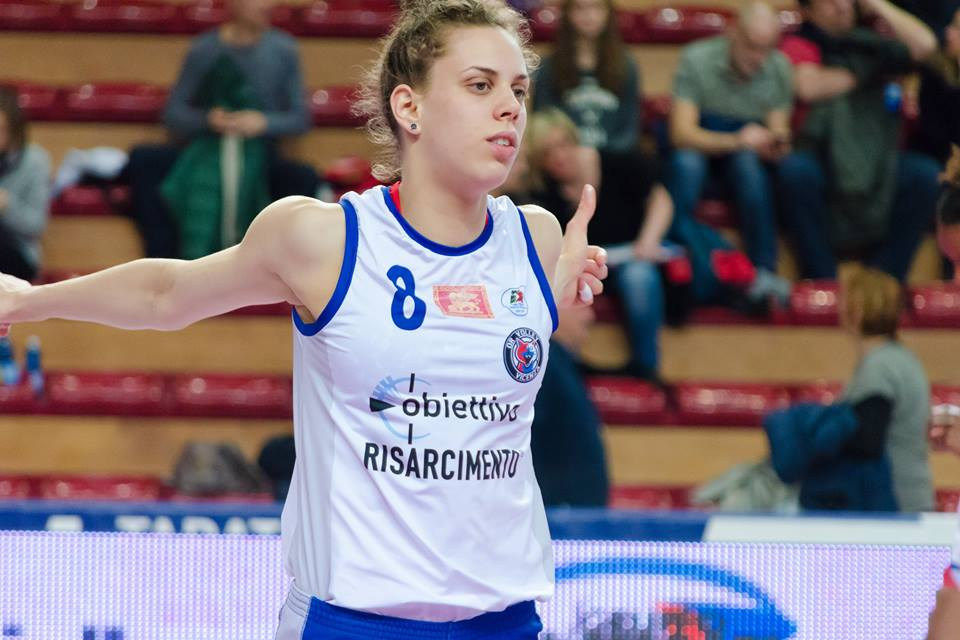
- Popović in 2016

Personal information
- Nationality: Serbian
- Born: 16 September 1994 (age 32); Kraljevo, Serbia, FR Yugoslavia
- Height: 1.87 m (6 ft 2 in)
- Weight: 65 kg (143 lb)
- Spike: 286 cm (113 in)
- Block: 276 cm (109 in)

Volleyball information
- Position: Middle blocker

Career
Years	Teams
2011–2015	OK Crvena Zvezda
2015–2016	Obiettivo Risarcimento
2016–2018	Volley Bergamo
2018–2019	Azzurra Volley San Casciano
2019–2020	Volleyball Casalmaggiore
2021–2022	Fenerbahçe Opet
2022–2023	Galatasaray HDI Sigorta
2023–2024	Lokomotiv Kaliningrad
2024–2025	Zarechie Odintsovo
2025-2026	Leningradka Saint Petersburg
2026-	LOVB Atlanta

National team
2015–	Serbia
Honours
Women's volleyball
Representing Serbia
Olympic Games
Bronze medal – third place	2020 Tokyo	Team
World Championship
Gold medal – first place	2022 Netherlands/Poland	Team
FIVB Nations League
Bronze medal – third place	2022 Ankara	Team
European Championship
Gold medal – first place	2017 Azerbaijan
Gold medal – first place	2019 Turkey
Silver medal – second place	2021 Serbia/Croatia/Bulgaria/Romania
Silver medal – second place	2023 Belgium/Estonia/Germany/Italy
Bronze medal – third place	2015 Netherlands/Belgium
Bronze medal – third place	2026 Azerbaijan/Czechia/Sweden/Turkey
European Games
Bronze medal – third place	2015 Baku	Team

Mina Popović (Serbian Cyrillic: Мина Поповић; born 16 September 1994) is a Serbian volleyball player.

== Club career ==
On club level, Popović ha played for OK Crvena Zvezda, Obiettivo Risarcimento, Volley Bergamo, Azzurra Volley San Casciano and Volleyball Casalmaggiore. With OK Crvena Zvezda, she won two Serbian volleyball league titles (2012, 2013) and three Serbian volleyball cup titles (2012, 2013, 2014).

=== Galatasaray ===
She signed a 1-year contract with Galatasaray HDI Sigorta on 17 August 2022.

== National team career ==
As part of the Serbia national volleyball team, Popović won a bronze medal at the 2015 European Games and the 2015 European Volleyball Championship, and the gold medal at the 2017 European Volleyball Championship.
