= Bianka Buša =

Serbian volleyball player (born 1994)

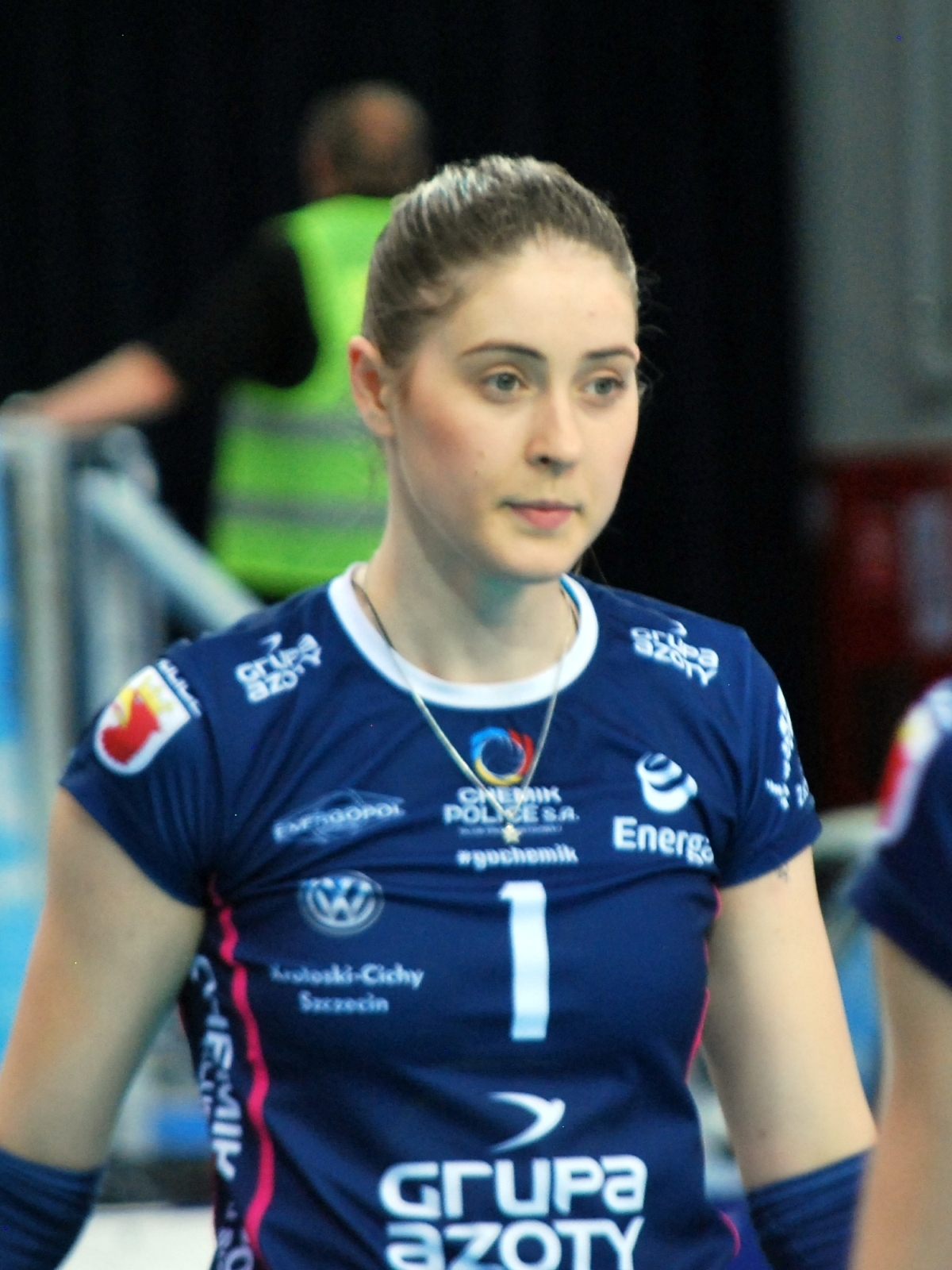
- Buša in 2018

Personal information
- Nationality: Serbian
- Born: 25 July 1994 (age 32); Vrbas, Serbia, FR Yugoslavia
- Height: 1.90 m (6 ft 3 in)
- Weight: 74 kg (163 lb)
- Spike: 312 cm (123 in)
- Block: 300 cm (118 in)

Volleyball information
- Position: Wing spiker
- Number: 12

Career
Years	Teams
2010–2015	ŽOK Vizura Belgrade
2015–2016	Volley Towers
2016	CSM Târgoviște
2016–2017	Metalleghe Montichiari
2017–2019	KPS Chemik Police
2019–2020	CSM Volei Alba Blaj
2020–2021	Fenerbahçe
2021–2022	Lokomotiv Kaliningrad
2022–	PTT Spor Kulübü
2025 -	Panionios V.C.

National team
2015–	Serbia
Honours
Women's volleyball
Representing Serbia
Olympic Games
Silver medal – second place	2016 Rio de Janeiro	Team
Bronze medal – third place	2020 Tokyo	Team
World Championship
Gold medal – first place	2018 Japan	Team
Gold medal – first place	2022 Netherlands/Poland	Team
European Championship
Gold medal – first place	2017 Azerbaijan/Georgia
Gold medal – first place	2019 Turkey
Silver medal – second place	2021 Serbia/Croatia/Bulgaria/Romania
Silver medal – second place	2023 Belgium/Estonia/Germany/Italy
Bronze medal – third place	2015 Netherlands/Belgium
World Cup
Silver medal – second place	2015 Japan
FIVB World Grand Prix
Bronze medal – third place	2017 Nanjing
European Games
Bronze medal – third place	2015 Baku	Team
FIVB Nations League
Bronze medal – third place	2022 Ankara	Team

Bianka Buša (Serbian Cyrillic: Бианка Буша; born 25 July 1994) is a Serbian volleyball player, playing as wing spiker. She had played for ŽOK Vizura Belgrade before continuing an international career in Italy in 2015, with a brief stint in Romanian CSM Târgoviște. From 2017 to 2019 she joined Polish club KPS Chemik Police. She joined Alba Blaj in the start of season 2019–2020.

With the Serbia women's national volleyball team, she competed at the 2015 Women's European Volleyball Championship, winning bronze, 2017 Women's European Volleyball Championship, winning gold, the 2016 Summer Olympics in Rio, winning silver, 2018 FIVB Volleyball Women's World Championship, winning gold., 2019 Women's European Volleyball Championship, winning gold and 2022 FIVB Volleyball Women's World Championship, winning gold.
