= Volleyball at the 2020 Summer Olympics – Men's European qualification =

2020 Men's European Olympic Qualification Tournament
Tournament details
- Host country: Germany
- City: Berlin
- Dates: 5–10 January
- Teams: 8 (from 1 confederation)
- Venue: 1 (in 1 host city)

Final positions
- Champions: France (1st title)
- Runners-up: Germany

Tournament awards
- MVP: (France) Jean Patry
- Best Setter: (Germany) Lukas Kampa
- Best OH: (Germany) Denys Kaliberda (France) Earvin N'Gapeth
- Best MB: (Bulgaria) Viktor Yosifov (France) Nicolas Le Goff
- Best OPP: (France) Jean Patry
- Best Libero: (France) Jenia Grebennikov

Tournament statistics
- Matches played: 15

The European Qualification Tournament for the 2020 Men's Olympic Volleyball Tournament was a volleyball tournament for men's national teams held in Berlin, Germany from 5 to 10 January 2020. Eight teams played in the tournament and the winners France qualified for the 2020 Summer Olympics. The 2020 Summer Olympics were postponed to 2021 due to the COVID-19 pandemic.

== Qualification ==
The hosts Germany and the top seven ranked teams from the CEV European Ranking as of 30 September 2019 which had not yet qualified to the 2020 Summer Olympics qualified for the tournament. Rankings are shown in brackets except the hosts who ranked tenth.

- Germany (Hosts)
- Serbia (1)
- France (3)
- Belgium (6)
- Slovenia (7)
- Bulgaria (8)
- Netherlands (9)
- Czech Republic (11)

== Pools composition ==
Teams were seeded following the serpentine system according to their CEV European Ranking as of 30 September 2019. CEV reserved the right to seed the hosts as head of pool A regardless of the European Ranking.

Pool A	Pool B
Germany	Serbia
Belgium	France
Slovenia	Bulgaria
Czech Republic	Netherlands

== Venue ==
All matches
Berlin, Germany
Max-Schmeling-Halle
Capacity: 8,500
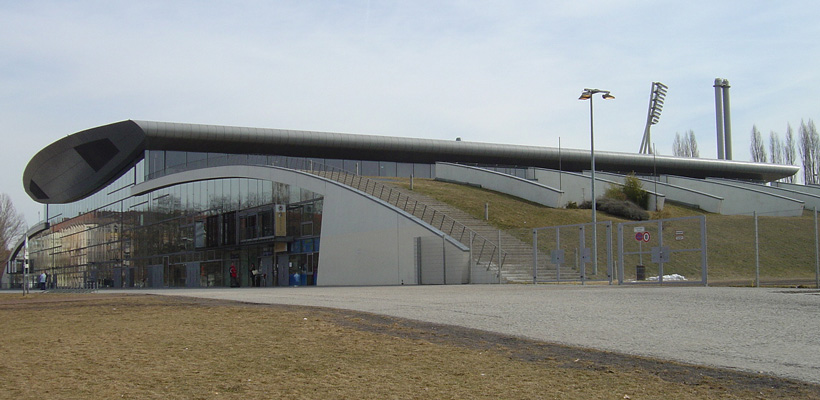

== Pool standing procedure ==
1. Number of matches won
2. Match points
3. Sets ratio
4. Points ratio
5. Result of the last match between the tied teams

Match won 3–0 or 3–1: 3 match points for the winner, 0 match points for the loser
Match won 3–2: 2 match points for the winner, 1 match point for the loser

== Preliminary round ==
- All times are Central European Time (UTC+01:00).

=== Pool A ===
Pos	Team	Pld	W	L	Pts	SW	SL	SR	SPW	SPL	SPR	Qualification
1	Slovenia	3	3	0	8	9	3	3.000	294	270	1.089	Semifinals
2	Germany	3	2	1	7	8	3	2.667	263	242	1.087	Semifinals
3	Belgium	3	1	2	2	3	8	0.375	249	267	0.933	
4	Czech Republic	3	0	3	1	3	9	0.333	263	290	0.907	

Date	Time		Score		Set 1	Set 2	Set 3	Set 4	Set 5	Total	Report
5 Jan	16:30	Slovenia	3–0	Belgium	25–23	28–26	25–20			78–69	Report
5 Jan	19:30	Czech Republic	0–3	Germany	19–25	22–25	20–25			61–75	Report
6 Jan	20:10	Belgium	0–3	Germany	18–25	23–25	24–26			65–76	Report
7 Jan	17:00	Belgium	3–2	Czech Republic	21–25	28–26	25–20	22–25	19–17	115–113	Report
7 Jan	20:10	Germany	2–3	Slovenia	34–32	20–25	25–19	21–25	12–15	112–116	Report
8 Jan	17:30	Slovenia	3–1	Czech Republic	25–12	28–26	19–25	28–26		100–89	Report

=== Pool B ===
Pos	Team	Pld	W	L	Pts	SW	SL	SR	SPW	SPL	SPR	Qualification
1	Bulgaria	3	3	0	7	9	4	2.250	285	260	1.096	Semifinals
2	France	3	1	2	5	7	6	1.167	281	271	1.037	Semifinals
3	Serbia	3	1	2	4	5	6	0.833	246	237	1.038	
4	Netherlands	3	1	2	2	3	8	0.375	209	253	0.826	

Date	Time		Score		Set 1	Set 2	Set 3	Set 4	Set 5	Total	Report
5 Jan	13:30	France	3–0	Serbia	25–21	25–21	25–22			75–64	Report
6 Jan	14:00	Netherlands	0–3	Serbia	18–25	18–25	17–25			53–75	Report
6 Jan	17:00	Bulgaria	3–2	France	25–23	17–25	25–22	19–25	15–8	101–103	Report
7 Jan	14:00	Bulgaria	3–0	Netherlands	25–19	25–16	25–15			75–50	Report
8 Jan	14:30	Serbia	2–3	Bulgaria	21–25	26–24	22–25	25–20	13–15	107–109	Report
8 Jan	20:45	France	2–3	Netherlands	25–21	25–20	22–25	19–25	12–15	103–106	Report

== Final round ==
- All times are Central European Time (UTC+01:00).

Semifinals
9 January
Slovenia	2
France	3
9 January
Bulgaria	1
Germany	3

Final
10 January
France	3
Germany	0

=== Semifinals ===
Date	Time		Score		Set 1	Set 2	Set 3	Set 4	Set 5	Total	Report
9 Jan	17:00	Slovenia	2–3	France	25–13	25–22	14–25	21–25	9–15	94–100	Report
9 Jan	20:10	Bulgaria	1–3	Germany	20–25	23–25	25–20	23–25		91–95	Report

=== Final ===
Date	Time		Score		Set 1	Set 2	Set 3	Set 4	Set 5	Total	Report
10 Jan	20:10	France	3–0	Germany	25–20	25–20	25–23			75–63	Report

== Final standing ==
Rank	Team
1	France
2	Germany
3	Bulgaria
3	Slovenia
5	Belgium
5	Serbia
7	Czech Republic
7	Netherlands

Qualified for the 2020 Summer Olympics

== Qualifying team for Summer Olympics ==
Team	Qualified on	Previous appearances in Summer Olympics (Note: Bold indicates champions for that year. Italic indicates hosts for that year.)
France	10 January 2020	4 (1988, 1992, 2004, 2016)

== Awards ==
- **Most valuable player**
  (France) Jean Patry
- **Best setter**
  (Germany) Lukas Kampa
- **Best outside spikers**
  (Germany) Denys Kaliberda
  (France) Earvin N'Gapeth
- **Best middle blockers**
  (Bulgaria) Viktor Yosifov
  (France) Nicolas Le Goff
- **Best opposite spiker**
  (France) Jean Patry
- **Best libero**
  (France) Jenia Grebennikov

== See also ==
- Volleyball at the 2020 Summer Olympics – Women's European qualification
