= Volleyball at the 2020 Summer Olympics – Men's African qualification =

2020 Men's African Olympic Qualification Tournament
Tournament details
- Host country: Egypt
- City: Cairo
- Dates: 7–11 January
- Teams: 5 (from 1 confederation)
- Venue: 1 (in 1 host city)

Final positions
- Champions: Tunisia (4th title)
- Runners-up: Egypt
- Third place: Algeria
- Fourth place: Cameroon

Tournament statistics
- Matches played: 6

The African Qualification Tournament for the 2020 Men's Olympic Volleyball Tournament was a volleyball tournament for men's national teams held in Cairo, Egypt from 7 to 11 January 2020. 5 teams played in the tournament and the winners Tunisia qualified for the 2020 Summer Olympics.

== Qualification ==
Seven CAVB national teams which had not yet qualified to the 2020 Summer Olympics entered qualification. But, Botswana and Niger later withdrew. In addition, Ghana were disqualified for not arriving in Cairo until just before the beginning of the tournament. All of Ghana's matches were forfeited and Ghana were ranked in last place in the final standing.

- Algeria
- Botswana (withdrew)
- Cameroon
- Egypt
- Ghana (Disqualified)
- Niger (withdrew)
- Tunisia

== Venue ==
- Cairo Stadium Indoor Hall 2, Cairo, Egypt

== Pool standing procedure ==
1. Number of matches won
2. Match points
3. Sets ratio
4. Points ratio
5. Result of the last match between the tied teams

Match won 3–0 or 3–1: 3 match points for the winner, 0 match points for the loser
Match won 3–2: 2 match points for the winner, 1 match point for the loser

== Round robin ==
- All times are Egypt Standard Time (UTC+02:00).
- Ghana's forfeited matches (25–0, 25–0, 25–0) were not recorded and excluded from the ranking calculation.

Pos	Team	Pld	W	L	Pts	SW	SL	SR	SPW	SPL	SPR
1	Tunisia	3	3	0	9	9	1	9.000	255	208	1.226
2	Egypt	3	2	1	6	6	4	1.500	235	211	1.114
3	Algeria	3	1	2	3	5	6	0.833	241	246	0.980
4	Cameroon	3	0	3	0	0	9	0.000	159	225	0.707
5	Ghana	0	0	0	0	0	0	—	0	0	—

Date	Time		Score		Set 1	Set 2	Set 3	Set 4	Set 5	Total	Report
7 Jan	20:15	Egypt	3–1	Algeria	25–18	25–17	21–25	25–20		96–80	P2
8 Jan	20:00	Cameroon	0–3	Tunisia	20–25	20–25	18–25			58–75	P2
9 Jan	17:00	Cameroon	0–3	Algeria	16–25	16–25	17–25			49–75	P2
9 Jan	20:00	Egypt	0–3	Tunisia	27–29	14–25	23–25			64–79	P2
10 Jan	20:00	Tunisia	3–1	Algeria	25–17	25–23	26–28	25–18		101–86	P2
11 Jan	20:00	Cameroon	0–3	Egypt	16–25	18–25	18–25			52–75	P2

== Final standing ==
Rank	Team
1	Tunisia
2	Egypt
3	Algeria
4	Cameroon
5	Ghana

Qualified for the 2020 Summer Olympics

== Qualifying team for Summer Olympics ==
Team	Qualified on	Previous appearances in Summer Olympics (Note: Bold indicates champions for that year. Italic indicates hosts for that year.)
Tunisia	10 January 2020	6 (1972, 1984, 1988, 1996, 2004, 2012)

== See also ==
- Volleyball at the 2020 Summer Olympics – Women's African qualification
