= Volleyball at the 2020 Summer Olympics – Women's North American qualification =

2020 Women's North American Olympic Qualification Tournament
Tournament details
- Host country: Dominican Republic
- City: Santo Domingo
- Dates: 10–12 January
- Teams: 4 (from 1 confederation)
- Venue: 1 (in 1 host city)

The 2020 Women's Volleyball North American Olympic Qualification Tournament will be a volleyball tournament for women's national teams to be held in Santo Domingo, Dominican Republic from 10 to 12 January 2020. 4 teams will play in the tournament, where the winner will qualify to the 2020 women's Olympic volleyball tournament.

== Qualification ==
The 2019 NORCECA Champions Cup champions which had not yet qualified to the 2020 Olympic Games and the top three teams from the 2019 NORCECA Championship which had not yet qualified to the 2020 Olympic Games or this tournament qualified for this tournament. Final standings of the 2019 NORCECA Champions Cup or 2019 NORCECA Championship are shown in brackets.

- Dominican Republic (2019 NORCECA Champions Cup runners-up)
- Canada (2019 NORCECA Championship 3rd place)
- Puerto Rico (2019 NORCECA Championship 4th place)
- Mexico (2019 NORCECA Championship 5th place)

== Pool standing procedure ==
1. Number of matches won
2. Match points
3. Points ratio
4. Sets ratio
5. Result of the last match between the tied teams

Match won 3–0: 5 match points for the winner, 0 match points for the loser
Match won 3–1: 4 match points for the winner, 1 match point for the loser
Match won 3–2: 3 match points for the winner, 2 match points for the loser

== Round robin ==
- All times are Atlantic Standard Time (UTC−04:00).

| Pos | Team | Pld | W | L | Pts | SPW | SPL | SPR | SW | SL | SR |
|---|---|---|---|---|---|---|---|---|---|---|---|
| 1 | Dominican Republic | 3 | 3 | 0 | 12 | 280 | 216 | 1.296 | 9 | 3 | 3.000 |
| 2 | Puerto Rico | 3 | 2 | 1 | 8 | 237 | 247 | 0.960 | 6 | 5 | 1.200 |
| 3 | Canada | 3 | 1 | 2 | 7 | 275 | 290 | 0.948 | 6 | 7 | 0.857 |
| 4 | Mexico | 3 | 0 | 3 | 3 | 241 | 280 | 0.861 | 3 | 9 | 0.333 |

| Date | Time | | Score | | Set 1 | Set 2 | Set 3 | Set 4 | Set 5 | Total | Report |
|---|---|---|---|---|---|---|---|---|---|---|---|
| 10 Jan | 17:00 | Canada | 2–3 | Puerto Rico | 22–25 | 25–22 | 25–22 | 23–25 | 12–15 | 107–109 | P2 P3 |
| 10 Jan | 20:00 | Dominican Republic | 3–2 | Mexico | 25–19 | 25–17 | 21–25 | 23–25 | 15–5 | 109–91 | P2 P3 |
| 11 Jan | 17:00 | Puerto Rico | 3–0 | Mexico | 25–20 | 25–22 | 25–23 | | | 75–65 | P2 P3 |
| 11 Jan | 19:00 | Canada | 1–3 | Dominican Republic | 13–25 | 25–21 | 19–25 | 15–25 | | 72–96 | P2 P3 |
| 12 Jan | 16:00 | Mexico | 1–3 | Canada | 25–21 | 19–25 | 18–25 | 23–25 | | 85–96 | P2 P3 |
| 12 Jan | 18:00 | Dominican Republic | 3–0 | Puerto Rico | 25–20 | 25–18 | 25–15 | | | 75–53 | P2 P3 |

== Final standing ==
| Rank | Team |
|---|---|
| 1 | Dominican Republic |
| 2 | Puerto Rico |
| 3 | Canada |
| 4 | Mexico |

| Qualified for the 2020 Olympic Games |

== See also ==
- Volleyball at the 2020 Summer Olympics – Men's North American qualification
