= Justine Wong-Orantes =

American volleyball player (born 1995)

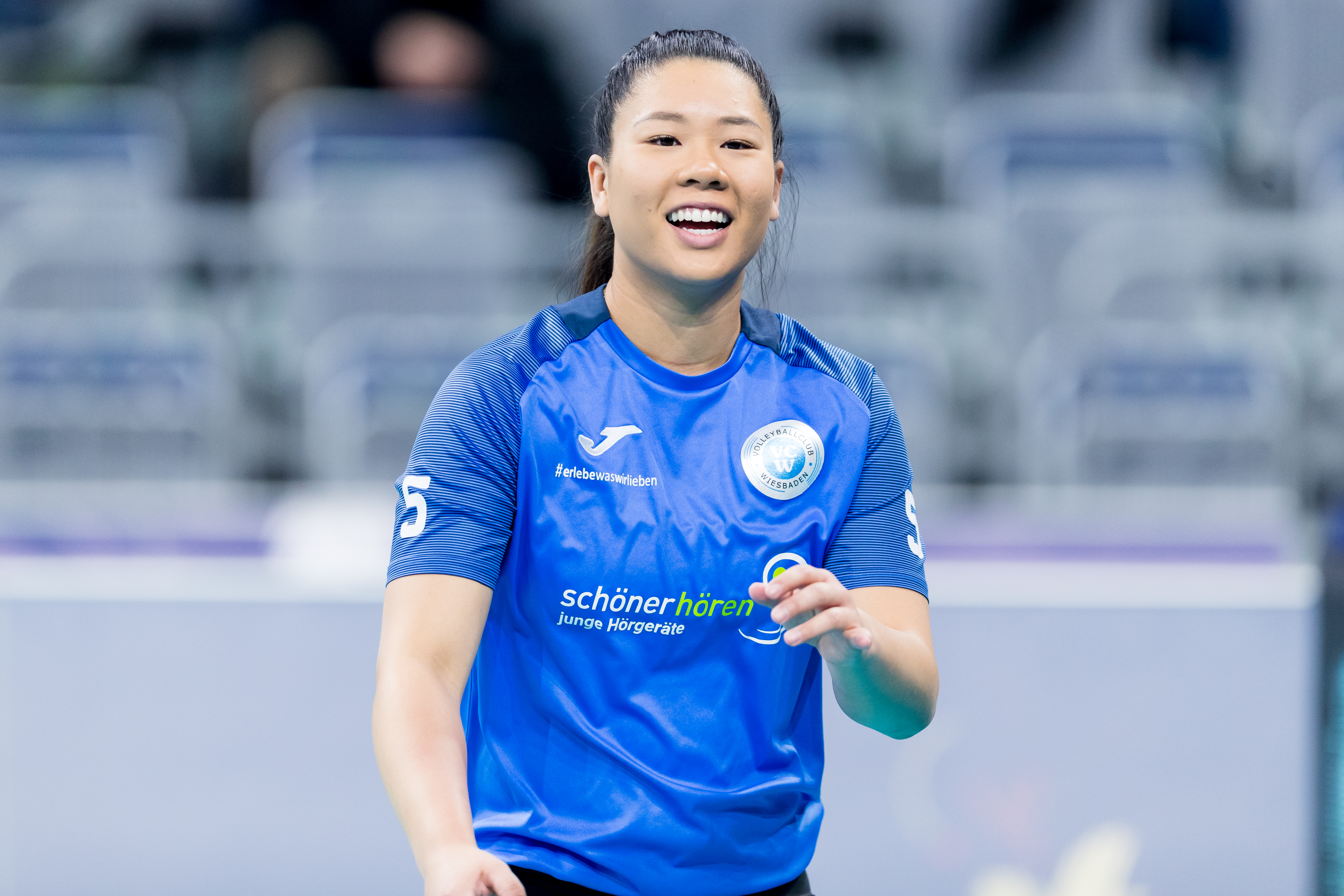
- Wong-Orantes in 2022

Personal information
- Born: October 6, 1995 (age 31); Torrance, California, U.S.
- Hometown: Cypress, California, U.S.
- Height: 5 ft 6 in (1.68 m)
- Weight: 146 lb (66 kg)
- Spike: 111 in (282 cm)
- Block: 109 in (277 cm)
- Education: Nebraska

Volleyball information
- Position: Libero
- Current club: (United States) LOVB Houston
- Number: 4 (national team)

Career
Years	Teams
2019–2020	(Germany) Schweriner SC
2020–2022	(Germany) VC Wiesbaden
2022–2023	(France) Béziers Volley
2023–2024	(Germany) SC Potsdam
2024-	(United States) LOVB Omaha

National team
2017–	United States
Medal record
Women's volleyball
Representing the United States
Olympic Games
Gold medal – first place	2020 Tokyo	Team
Silver medal – second place	2024 Paris	Team
World Cup
Silver medal – second place	2019 Japan	Team
FIVB Nations League
Gold medal – first place	2018 Nanjing	Team
Gold medal – first place	2021 Rimini	Team
NORCECA Championship
Silver medal – second place	2019 San Juan	Team
Pan-American Cup
Gold medal – first place	2017 Cañete/Lima
Gold medal – first place	2018 Santo Domingo
Gold medal – first place	2019 Trujillo/Chiclayo
Bronze medal – third place	2016 Santo Domingo
World Grand Champions Cup
Bronze medal – third place	2017 Japan	Team

Justine Wong-Orantes (born October 6, 1995) is an American volleyball player who plays as libero for the United States women's national volleyball team. She played college volleyball for the Nebraska Cornhuskers, where she won an NCAA national championship. She began playing for U.S. national team in 2017. In 2021, she was one of twelve players who won a gold medal at the 2020 Summer Olympics in Tokyo, the first-ever gold medal finish for the women's national team.

== Career ==
=== Early life and high school ===
Wong-Orantes is Filipino-Chinese of descent on her mother's side and of Mexican descent on her father's side. Both of her parents, Winnie Wong and Robert Orantes, were volleyball players. Her father also coached the Mizuno Long Beach volleyball club.

She was an accomplished beach volleyball player from a young age, partnering with Sara Hughes and appearing on "Volleyball" magazine covers at age 12, after winning a prestigious beach volleyball California tournament. She was the youngest female to ever earn an AAA rating in beach volleyball. She attended high school at Los Alamitos High School in Los Alamitos, California, where as an indoor player, her position was setter where she led her Long Beach-based club team to a national title.

Due to her being considered undersized at 5'6", she was not heavily recruited coming out of high school by top volleyball schools. It wasn't until she was attending a high school club tournament, when the head coach got tired of so many balls dropping easily and asked her to put on a libero jersey. Nebraska head coach John Cook happened to be at the tournament and watched her play in her first ever match as libero. He saw potential in her, invited her for a visit to campus, where she eventually committed to play.

=== University of Nebraska ===
Wong-Orantes played both beach and indoor volleyball at Nebraska. In indoor volleyball, she won several accolades, including AVCA First Team All-American in 2016 and Third Team All-American in 2015. She was a two time Big Ten Defensive Player of the Year in 2015 and 2016, and finished her career as Nebraska's all-time career digs leader with 1,890. She helped her team win the 2015 NCAA national championship.

=== U.S. National Team ===
Wong-Orantes joined the United States national team in 2017, during which year she won gold at the Pan-American Volleyball Cup and bronze at the Volleyball World Grand Prix.

In May 2021, she was named to the 18-player roster for the FIVB Volleyball Nations League tournament that was played in Rimini, Italy. She was named the best libero of the tournament after helping Team USA win its third straight gold medal.

On June 7, 2021, U.S. National Team head coach Karch Kiraly announced she would be part of the 12-player Olympic roster for the 2020 Summer Olympics in Tokyo. Wong-Orantes led the Olympics in serve reception percentage and helped the U.S. capture its first-ever gold medal. She was named the best libero of the Olympics.

== Professional clubs ==
- (Germany) Schweriner SC (2019–2020)
- (Germany) VC Wiesbaden (2020–2022)
- (France) Béziers Volley (2022–2023)
- (Germany) SC Potsdam (2023–2024)
- (United States) LOVB Omaha (2024–present)

== International awards ==
- 2021 FIVB Nations League - "Best Libero"
- 2020 Summer Olympics - "Best Libero"

Awards
Preceded by (China) Lin Li	Best Libero of Olympic Games; 2020	Succeeded by (Italy) Monica De Gennaro
Preceded by (United States) Megan Courtney	Best Libero of FIVB Nations League; 2021	Succeeded by (Italy) Monica De Gennaro
