= Volleyball at the 2020 Summer Olympics – Women's tournament =

Women's volleyball at the Games of the XXXII Olympiad
- Venue: Ariake Arena
- Date: 25 July – 8 August 2021
- Competitors: 144 from 12 nations

Medalists
| 1st place, gold medalist(s) | | United States (1st title) |
| 2nd place, silver medalist(s) | | Brazil |
| 3rd place, bronze medalist(s) | | Serbia |

The women's tournament in volleyball at the 2020 Summer Olympics was the 15th edition of the event at an Olympic Games, organised by the world's governing body, the FIVB, in conjunction with the IOC. It was held in Tokyo, Japan from 25 July to 8 August 2021. It was originally scheduled to take place from 26 July to 9 August 2020, but due to the COVID-19 pandemic, the IOC and the Tokyo 2020 Organising Committee announced on 24 March 2020 that the 2020 Summer Olympics would be delayed to 2021. Because of this pandemic, the games were played behind closed doors.

The United States won their first gold after finishing runners-up three times with a 3–0 win over Brazil. Serbia won the bronze medal with a victory over South Korea.

The medals for the competition were presented by Nenad Lalović, IOC Executive Board Member; Serbia, and the medalists' bouquets were presented by Ary Graça, FIVB President; Brazil.

== Competition schedule ==
| P | Preliminary round | ¼ | Quarter-finals | ½ | Semi-finals | B | Bronze medal match | F | Gold medal match |

| Sun 25 | Mon 26 | Tue 27 | Wed 28 | Thu 29 | Fri 30 | Sat 31 | Sun 1 | Mon 2 | Tue 3 | Wed 4 | Thu 5 | Fri 6 | Sat 7 | Sun 8 | |
|---|---|---|---|---|---|---|---|---|---|---|---|---|---|---|---|
| P | | P | | P | | P | | P | | ¼ | | ½ | | B | F |

== Qualification ==
| Event | | Dates | Venue(s) | Quota | Qualifier(s) |
|---|---|---|---|---|---|
| Host nation | | —N/a | | 1 | Japan |
| Intercontinental Qualifier | Pool A | 1–4 August 2019 | (Poland) Wrocław | 1 | Serbia |
| Intercontinental Qualifier | Pool B | 1–4 August 2019 | (China) Ningbo | 1 | China |
| Intercontinental Qualifier | Pool C | 1–4 August 2019 | (United States) Bossier City | 1 | United States |
| Intercontinental Qualifier | Pool D | 1–4 August 2019 | (Brazil) Uberlândia | 1 | Brazil |
| Intercontinental Qualifier | Pool E | 1–4 August 2019 | (Russia) Kaliningrad | 1 | ROC |
| Intercontinental Qualifier | Pool F | 1–4 August 2019 | (Italy) Catania | 1 | Italy |
| African Qualifier | | 5–9 January 2020 | (Cameroon) Yaoundé | 1 | Kenya |
| South American Qualifier | | 7–9 January 2020 | (Colombia) Bogotá | 1 | Argentina |
| Asian Qualifier | | 7–12 January 2020 | (Thailand) Nakhon Ratchasima | 1 | South Korea |
| European Qualifier | | 7–12 January 2020 | (Netherlands) Apeldoorn | 1 | Turkey |
| North American Qualifier | | 10–12 January 2020 | (Dominican Republic) Santo Domingo | 1 | Dominican Republic |
| Total | | | | 12 | |

== Pools composition ==
Teams were seeded following the serpentine system according to their FIVB World Ranking as of 29 September 2019. FIVB reserved the right to seed the hosts as head of pool A regardless of the World Ranking. Rankings are shown in brackets except the hosts who ranked 7th.

| Pool A | Pool B |
|---|---|
| Japan (Hosts) | China (1) |
| Serbia (3) | United States (2) |
| Brazil (4) | ROC (5) |
| South Korea (9) | Italy (8) |
| Dominican Republic (10) | Argentina (11) |
| Kenya (19) | Turkey (12) |

== Venue ==
All matches
Tokyo, Japan
Ariake Arena
Capacity: 15,000
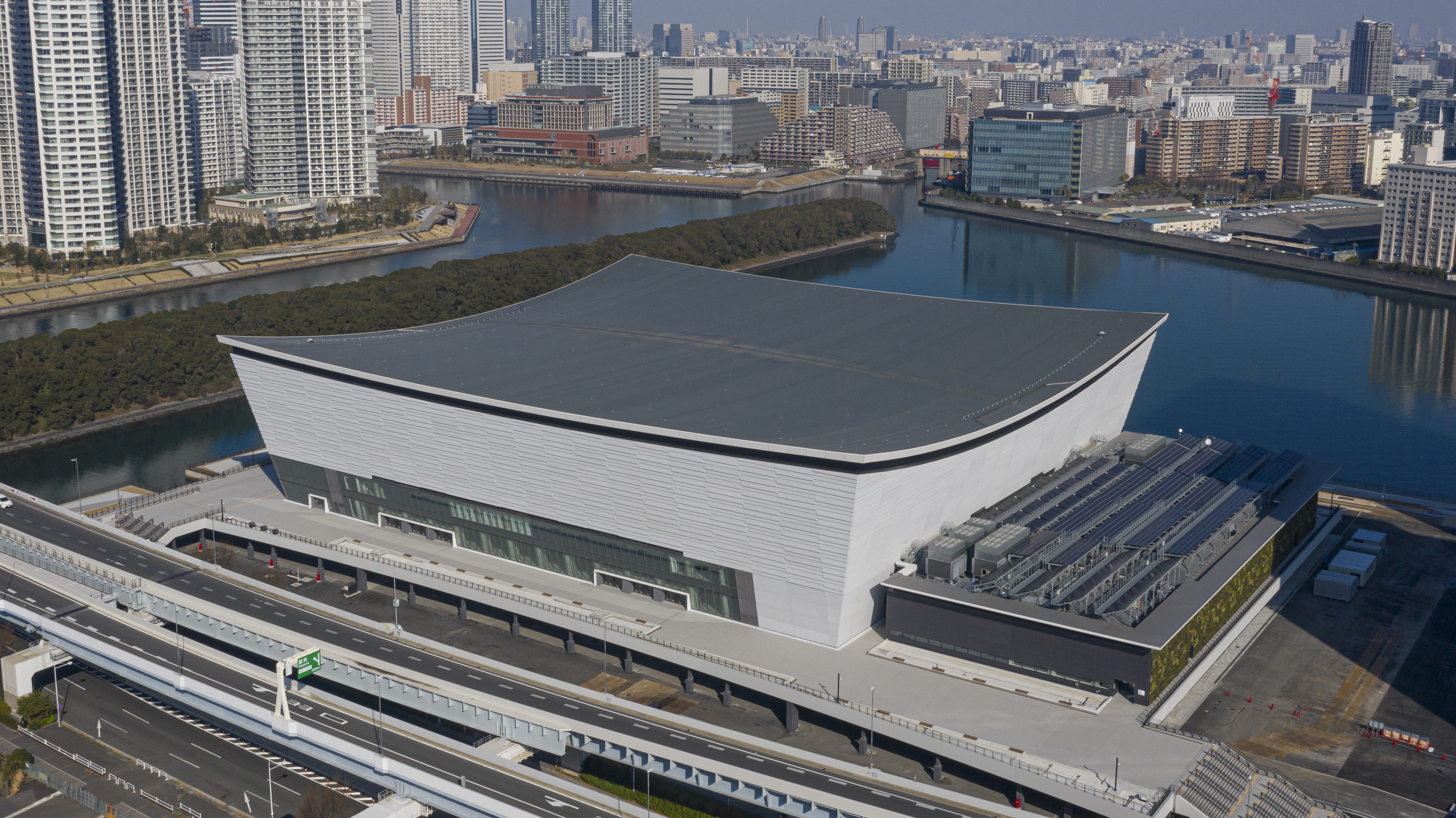

== Format ==
The preliminary round was a competition between the twelve teams divided into two pools of six teams. The teams competed in a single round-robin format. The four highest ranked teams in each group advanced to the knockout stage (quarter-finals). The sixth placed teams in each pool were ranked eleventh in this competition. The fifth placed teams in each pool were ranked ninth.

The knockout stage followed the single-elimination format. The losers of the quarter-finals were eliminated and ranked fifth. The quarterfinal winners played in the semi-finals. The winners of the semi-finals competed for gold medals and the losers played for bronze medals.

== Pool standing procedure ==
In order to establish the ranking of teams after the group stage, the following criteria should be implemented:

1. Number of matches won
2. Match points
3. Sets ratio
4. Points ratio
5. Result of the last match between the tied teams

Match won 3–0 or 3–1: 3 match points for the winner, 0 match points for the loser
Match won 3–2: 2 match points for the winner, 1 match point for the loser

== Referees ==
The following referees were selected for the tournament.

- (Argentina) Hernán Casamiquela
- (Brazil) Paulo Turci
- (China) Liu Jiang
- (Dominican Republic) Denny Cespedes
- (France) Fabrice Collados
- (Italy) Daniele Rapisarda
- (Japan) Shin Muranaka
- (Japan) Sumie Myoi
- (Mexico) Luis Macias
- (Poland) Wojciech Maroszek
- (Russia) Evgeny Makshanov
- (Serbia) Vladimir Simonović
- (Slovakia) Juraj Mokrý
- (South Korea) Kang Joo-hee
- (Spain) Susana Rodríguez
- (United Arab Emirates) Hamid Al-Rousi
- (United States) Patricia Rolf

== Preliminary round ==
- All times are Japan Standard Time (UTC+09:00).
- The top four teams in each pool qualified for the quarter-finals.

=== Pool A ===
| Pos | Team | Pld | W | L | Pts | SW | SL | SR | SPW | SPL | SPR | Qualification |
|---|---|---|---|---|---|---|---|---|---|---|---|---|
| 1 | Brazil | 5 | 5 | 0 | 14 | 15 | 3 | 5.000 | 434 | 315 | 1.378 | Quarter-finals |
| 2 | Serbia | 5 | 4 | 1 | 12 | 13 | 3 | 4.333 | 381 | 313 | 1.217 | Quarter-finals |
| 3 | South Korea | 5 | 3 | 2 | 7 | 9 | 10 | 0.900 | 374 | 415 | 0.901 | Quarter-finals |
| 4 | Dominican Republic | 5 | 2 | 3 | 8 | 10 | 10 | 1.000 | 411 | 406 | 1.012 | Quarter-finals |
| 5 | Japan (H) | 5 | 1 | 4 | 4 | 6 | 12 | 0.500 | 378 | 395 | 0.957 | |
| 6 | Kenya | 5 | 0 | 5 | 0 | 0 | 15 | 0.000 | 242 | 376 | 0.644 | |

Source: Tokyo 2020 and FIVB
Rules for classification: Tiebreakers
(H) Host

| 25 July 2021; 14:20 | Serbia | 3–0 | Dominican Republic | Ariake Arena, Tokyo; Referees: Kang Joo-hee (KOR), Evgeny Makshanov (RUS) |
| 25 July 2021; 14:20 | (25–18, 25–12, 25–20); Results Statistics | | | Ariake Arena, Tokyo; Referees: Kang Joo-hee (KOR), Evgeny Makshanov (RUS) |

| 25 July 2021; 19:40 | Japan | 3–0 | Kenya | Ariake Arena, Tokyo; Referees: Fabrice Collados (FRA), Hamid Al-Rousi (UAE) |
| 25 July 2021; 19:40 | (25–15, 25–11, 25–23); Results Statistics | | | Ariake Arena, Tokyo; Referees: Fabrice Collados (FRA), Hamid Al-Rousi (UAE) |

| 25 July 2021; 21:45 | Brazil | 3–0 | South Korea | Ariake Arena, Tokyo; Referees: Liu Jiang (CHN), Shin Muranaka (JPN) |
| 25 July 2021; 21:45 | (25–10, 25–22, 25–19); Results Statistics | | | Ariake Arena, Tokyo; Referees: Liu Jiang (CHN), Shin Muranaka (JPN) |

| 27 July 2021; 14:20 | Japan | 0–3 | Serbia | Ariake Arena, Tokyo; Referees: Patricia Rolf (USA), Juraj Mokrý (SVK) |
| 27 July 2021; 14:20 | (23–25, 16–25, 24–26); Results Statistics | | | Ariake Arena, Tokyo; Referees: Patricia Rolf (USA), Juraj Mokrý (SVK) |

| 27 July 2021; 19:40 | Brazil | 3–2 | Dominican Republic | Ariake Arena, Tokyo; Referees: Susana Rodríguez (ESP), Vladimir Simonović (SRB) |
| 27 July 2021; 19:40 | (22–25, 25–17, 25–13, 23–25, 15–12); Results Statistics | | | Ariake Arena, Tokyo; Referees: Susana Rodríguez (ESP), Vladimir Simonović (SRB) |

| 27 July 2021; 21:45 | South Korea | 3–0 | Kenya | Ariake Arena, Tokyo; Referees: Sumie Myoi (JPN), Evgeny Makshanov (RUS) |
| 27 July 2021; 21:45 | (25–14, 25–22, 26–24); Results Statistics | | | Ariake Arena, Tokyo; Referees: Sumie Myoi (JPN), Evgeny Makshanov (RUS) |

| 29 July 2021; 11:05 | South Korea | 3–2 | Dominican Republic | Ariake Arena, Tokyo; Referees: Hernán Casamiquela (ARG), Shin Muranaka (JPN) |
| 29 July 2021; 11:05 | (25–20, 17–25, 25–18, 15–25, 15–12); Results Statistics | | | Ariake Arena, Tokyo; Referees: Hernán Casamiquela (ARG), Shin Muranaka (JPN) |

| 29 July 2021; 14:20 | Serbia | 3–0 | Kenya | Ariake Arena, Tokyo; Referees: Hamid Al-Rousi (UAE), Sumie Myoi (JPN) |
| 29 July 2021; 14:20 | (25–21, 25–11, 25–20); Results Statistics | | | Ariake Arena, Tokyo; Referees: Hamid Al-Rousi (UAE), Sumie Myoi (JPN) |

| 29 July 2021; 19:40 | Japan | 0–3 | Brazil | Ariake Arena, Tokyo; Referees: Denny Cespedes (DOM), Evgeny Makshanov (RUS) |
| 29 July 2021; 19:40 | (16–25, 18–25, 24–26); Results Statistics | | | Ariake Arena, Tokyo; Referees: Denny Cespedes (DOM), Evgeny Makshanov (RUS) |

| 31 July 2021; 09:00 | Dominican Republic | 3–0 | Kenya | Ariake Arena, Tokyo; Referees: Kang Joo-hee (KOR), Patricia Rolf (USA) |
| 31 July 2021; 09:00 | (25–19, 25–18, 25–10); Results Statistics | | | Ariake Arena, Tokyo; Referees: Kang Joo-hee (KOR), Patricia Rolf (USA) |

| 31 July 2021; 16:25 | Serbia | 1–3 | Brazil | Ariake Arena, Tokyo; Referees: Fabrice Collados (FRA), Wojciech Maroszek (POL) |
| 31 July 2021; 16:25 | (20–25, 16–25, 25–23, 19–25); Results Statistics | | | Ariake Arena, Tokyo; Referees: Fabrice Collados (FRA), Wojciech Maroszek (POL) |

| 31 July 2021; 19:40 | Japan | 2–3 | South Korea | Ariake Arena, Tokyo; Referees: Susana Rodríguez (ESP), Paulo Turci (BRA) |
| 31 July 2021; 19:40 | (19–25, 25–19, 22–25, 25–15, 14–16); Results Statistics | | | Ariake Arena, Tokyo; Referees: Susana Rodríguez (ESP), Paulo Turci (BRA) |

| 2 August 2021; 09:00 | Serbia | 3–0 | South Korea | Ariake Arena, Tokyo; Referees: Evgeny Makshanov (RUS), Sumie Myoi (JPN) |
| 2 August 2021; 09:00 | (25–18, 25–17, 25–15); Results Statistics | | | Ariake Arena, Tokyo; Referees: Evgeny Makshanov (RUS), Sumie Myoi (JPN) |

| 2 August 2021; 19:40 | Japan | 1–3 | Dominican Republic | Ariake Arena, Tokyo; Referees: Patricia Rolf (USA), Wojciech Maroszek (POL) |
| 2 August 2021; 19:40 | (10–25, 23–25, 25–19, 19–25); Results Statistics | | | Ariake Arena, Tokyo; Referees: Patricia Rolf (USA), Wojciech Maroszek (POL) |

| 2 August 2021; 21:45 | Brazil | 3–0 | Kenya | Ariake Arena, Tokyo; Referees: Vladimir Simonović (SRB), Daniele Rapisarda (ITA) |
| 2 August 2021; 21:45 | (25–10, 25–16, 25–8); Results Statistics | | | Ariake Arena, Tokyo; Referees: Vladimir Simonović (SRB), Daniele Rapisarda (ITA) |

=== Pool B ===
| Pos | Team | Pld | W | L | Pts | SW | SL | SR | SPW | SPL | SPR | Qualification |
|---|---|---|---|---|---|---|---|---|---|---|---|---|
| 1 | United States | 5 | 4 | 1 | 10 | 12 | 7 | 1.714 | 418 | 401 | 1.042 | Quarter-finals |
| 2 | Italy | 5 | 3 | 2 | 10 | 11 | 7 | 1.571 | 409 | 377 | 1.085 | Quarter-finals |
| 3 | Turkey | 5 | 3 | 2 | 9 | 12 | 8 | 1.500 | 434 | 416 | 1.043 | Quarter-finals |
| 4 | ROC | 5 | 3 | 2 | 9 | 11 | 8 | 1.375 | 422 | 378 | 1.116 | Quarter-finals |
| 5 | China | 5 | 2 | 3 | 7 | 8 | 9 | 0.889 | 374 | 385 | 0.971 | |
| 6 | Argentina | 5 | 0 | 5 | 0 | 0 | 15 | 0.000 | 275 | 375 | 0.733 | |

Source: Tokyo 2020 and FIVB
Rules for classification: Tiebreakers

| 25 July 2021; 09:00 | ROC | 0–3 | Italy | Ariake Arena, Tokyo; Referees: Patricia Rolf (USA), Wojciech Maroszek (POL) |
| 25 July 2021; 09:00 | (23–25, 19–25, 14–25); Results Statistics | | | Ariake Arena, Tokyo; Referees: Patricia Rolf (USA), Wojciech Maroszek (POL) |

| 25 July 2021; 11:05 | United States | 3–0 | Argentina | Ariake Arena, Tokyo; Referees: Sumie Myoi (JPN), Daniele Rapisarda (ITA) |
| 25 July 2021; 11:05 | (25–20, 25–19, 25–20); Results Statistics | | | Ariake Arena, Tokyo; Referees: Sumie Myoi (JPN), Daniele Rapisarda (ITA) |

| 25 July 2021; 16:25 | China | 0–3 | Turkey | Ariake Arena, Tokyo; Referees: Susana Rodríguez (ESP), Luis Macias (MEX) |
| 25 July 2021; 16:25 | (21–25, 14–25, 14–25); Results Statistics | | | Ariake Arena, Tokyo; Referees: Susana Rodríguez (ESP), Luis Macias (MEX) |

| 27 July 2021; 09:00 | ROC | 3–0 | Argentina | Ariake Arena, Tokyo; Referees: Kang Joo-hee (KOR), Hamid Al-Rousi (UAE) |
| 27 July 2021; 09:00 | (25–19, 25–15, 25–13); Results Statistics | | | Ariake Arena, Tokyo; Referees: Kang Joo-hee (KOR), Hamid Al-Rousi (UAE) |

| 27 July 2021; 11:05 | China | 0–3 | United States | Ariake Arena, Tokyo; Referees: Wojciech Maroszek (POL), Fabrice Collados (FRA) |
| 27 July 2021; 11:05 | (27–29, 22–25, 21–25); Results Statistics | | | Ariake Arena, Tokyo; Referees: Wojciech Maroszek (POL), Fabrice Collados (FRA) |

| 27 July 2021; 16:25 | Italy | 3–1 | Turkey | Ariake Arena, Tokyo; Referees: Denny Cespedes (DOM), Hernán Casamiquela (ARG) |
| 27 July 2021; 16:25 | (25–22, 23–25, 25–20, 25–15); Results Statistics | | | Ariake Arena, Tokyo; Referees: Denny Cespedes (DOM), Hernán Casamiquela (ARG) |

| 29 July 2021; 09:00 | Italy | 3–0 | Argentina | Ariake Arena, Tokyo; Referees: Susana Rodríguez (ESP), Liu Jiang (CHN) |
| 29 July 2021; 09:00 | (25–21, 25–16, 25–15); Results Statistics | | | Ariake Arena, Tokyo; Referees: Susana Rodríguez (ESP), Liu Jiang (CHN) |

| 29 July 2021; 16:25 | China | 2–3 | ROC | Ariake Arena, Tokyo; Referees: Daniele Rapisarda (ITA), Juraj Mokrý (SVK) |
| 29 July 2021; 16:25 | (17–25, 25–23, 25–20, 25–27, 12–15); Results Statistics | | | Ariake Arena, Tokyo; Referees: Daniele Rapisarda (ITA), Juraj Mokrý (SVK) |

| 29 July 2021; 21:45 | United States | 3–2 | Turkey | Ariake Arena, Tokyo; Referees: Paulo Turci (BRA), Kang Joo-hee (KOR) |
| 29 July 2021; 21:45 | (25–19, 25–20, 17–25, 20–25, 15–12); ResultsStatistics | | | Ariake Arena, Tokyo; Referees: Paulo Turci (BRA), Kang Joo-hee (KOR) |

| 31 July 2021; 11:05 | United States | 0–3 | ROC | Ariake Arena, Tokyo; Referees: Vladimir Simonović (SRB), Hernán Casamiquela (ARG) |
| 31 July 2021; 11:05 | (20–25, 12–25, 19–25); Results Statistics | | | Ariake Arena, Tokyo; Referees: Vladimir Simonović (SRB), Hernán Casamiquela (ARG) |

| 31 July 2021; 14:20 | Argentina | 0–3 | Turkey | Ariake Arena, Tokyo; Referees: Sumie Myoi (JPN), Hamid Al-Rousi (UAE) |
| 31 July 2021; 14:20 | (23–25, 20–25, 18–25); Results Statistics | | | Ariake Arena, Tokyo; Referees: Sumie Myoi (JPN), Hamid Al-Rousi (UAE) |

| 31 July 2021; 21:45 | China | 3–0 | Italy | Ariake Arena, Tokyo; Referees: Shin Muranaka (JPN), Evgeny Makshanov (RUS) |
| 31 July 2021; 21:45 | (25–21, 25–20, 26–24); Results Statistics | | | Ariake Arena, Tokyo; Referees: Shin Muranaka (JPN), Evgeny Makshanov (RUS) |

| 2 August 2021; 11:05 | United States | 3–2 | Italy | Ariake Arena, Tokyo; Referees: Liu Jiang (CHN), Luis Macias (MEX) |
| 2 August 2021; 11:05 | (21–25, 25–16, 25–27, 25–16, 15–12); Results Statistics | | | Ariake Arena, Tokyo; Referees: Liu Jiang (CHN), Luis Macias (MEX) |

| 2 August 2021; 14:20 | ROC | 2–3 | Turkey | Ariake Arena, Tokyo; Referees: Fabrice Collados (FRA), Susana Rodríguez (ESP) |
| 2 August 2021; 14:20 | (25–21, 23–25, 23–25, 25–15, 10–15); Results Statistics | | | Ariake Arena, Tokyo; Referees: Fabrice Collados (FRA), Susana Rodríguez (ESP) |

| 2 August 2021; 16:25 | China | 3–0 | Argentina | Ariake Arena, Tokyo; Referees: Kang Joo-hee (KOR), Denny Cespedes (DOM) |
| 2 August 2021; 16:25 | (25–15, 25–22, 25–19); Results Statistics | | | Ariake Arena, Tokyo; Referees: Kang Joo-hee (KOR), Denny Cespedes (DOM) |

== Knockout stage ==
- The first ranked teams of both pools played against the fourth ranked teams of the other pool. The second ranked teams faced the second or third ranked teams of the other pool, determined by drawing of lots. The drawing of lots was held after the last match in the preliminary round. As it happened at the 2008 Beijing Olympic Games, the drawing ended up with the 2nd ranked teams facing each other, and the 3rd ranked teams playing against each other.

=== Bracket ===
Quarter-finals
4 August
Brazil | 3
ROC | 1
4 August
South Korea | 3
Turkey | 2
4 August
Dominican Republic | 0
United States | 3
4 August
Serbia | 3
Italy | 0

Semi-finals
6 August
Brazil | 3
South Korea | 0
6 August
Serbia | 0
United States | 3

Gold medal match
8 August
Brazil | 0
United States | 3
Bronze medal match
8 August
South Korea | 0
Serbia | 3

=== Quarter-finals ===
| 4 August 2021; 09:00 | South Korea | 3–2 | Turkey | Ariake Arena, Tokyo; Referees: Hamid Al-Rousi (UAE), Patricia Rolf (USA) |
| 4 August 2021; 09:00 | (17–25, 25–17, 28–26, 18–25, 15–13); Results Statistics | | | Ariake Arena, Tokyo; Referees: Hamid Al-Rousi (UAE), Patricia Rolf (USA) |

| 4 August 2021; 13:00 | Dominican Republic | 0–3 | United States | Ariake Arena, Tokyo; Referees: Luis Macias (MEX), Kang Joo-hee (KOR) |
| 4 August 2021; 13:00 | (11–25, 20–25, 19–25); Results Statistics | | | Ariake Arena, Tokyo; Referees: Luis Macias (MEX), Kang Joo-hee (KOR) |

| 4 August 2021; 17:00 | Serbia | 3–0 | Italy | Ariake Arena, Tokyo; Referees: Paulo Turci (BRA), Evgeny Makshanov (RUS) |
| 4 August 2021; 17:00 | (25–21, 25–14, 25–21); Results Statistics | | | Ariake Arena, Tokyo; Referees: Paulo Turci (BRA), Evgeny Makshanov (RUS) |

| 4 August 2021; 21:30 | Brazil | 3–1 | ROC | Ariake Arena, Tokyo; Referees: Fabrice Collados (FRA), Susana Rodríguez (ESP) |
| 4 August 2021; 21:30 | (23–25, 25–21, 25–19, 25–22); Results Statistics | | | Ariake Arena, Tokyo; Referees: Fabrice Collados (FRA), Susana Rodríguez (ESP) |

=== Semi-finals ===
Tandara Caixeta of Brazil was suspended from the semi-final match against South Korea after a positive out-of-competition drug test for Enobosarm.

| 6 August 2021; 13:00 | Serbia | 0–3 | United States | Ariake Arena, Tokyo; Referees: Hernán Casamiquela (ARG), Susana Rodríguez (ESP) |
| 6 August 2021; 13:00 | (19–25, 15–25, 23–25); Results Statistics | | | Ariake Arena, Tokyo; Referees: Hernán Casamiquela (ARG), Susana Rodríguez (ESP) |

| 6 August 2021; 21:00 | Brazil | 3–0 | South Korea | Ariake Arena, Tokyo; Referees: Luis Macias (MEX), Denny Cespedes (DOM) |
| 6 August 2021; 21:00 | (25–16, 25–16, 25–16); Results Statistics | | | Ariake Arena, Tokyo; Referees: Luis Macias (MEX), Denny Cespedes (DOM) |

=== Bronze medal match ===
| 8 August 2021; 09:00 | South Korea | 0–3 | Serbia | Ariake Arena, Tokyo; Referees: Daniele Rapisarda (ITA), Patricia Rolf (USA) |
| 8 August 2021; 09:00 | (18–25, 15–25, 15–25); Results Statistics | | | Ariake Arena, Tokyo; Referees: Daniele Rapisarda (ITA), Patricia Rolf (USA) |

=== Gold medal match ===
| 8 August 2021; 13:30 | Brazil | 0–3 | United States | Ariake Arena, Tokyo; Referees: Juraj Mokrý (SVK), Hernán Casamiquela (ARG) |
| 8 August 2021; 13:30 | (21–25, 20–25, 14–25); Results Statistics | | | Ariake Arena, Tokyo; Referees: Juraj Mokrý (SVK), Hernán Casamiquela (ARG) |

== Statistics leaders ==
- Only players whose teams advanced to the semifinals are ranked.

Best scorers

| Rank | Name | Points |
|---|---|---|
| 1 | (Serbia) Tijana Bošković | 192 |
| 2 | (South Korea) Kim Yeon-koung | 136 |
| 3 | (Brazil) Fernanda Garay | 120 |
| 4 | (Brazil) Gabriela Guimarães | 106 |
| 5 | (United States) Jordan Larson | 91 |
| 5 | (United States) Michelle Bartsch-Hackley | 91 |

Best spikers

| Rank | Name | %Eff |
|---|---|---|
| 1 | (Brazil) Fernanda Garay | 41.40 |
| 2 | (Serbia) Tijana Bošković | 36.42 |
| 3 | (United States) Andrea Drews | 34.94 |
| 4 | (South Korea) Kim Yeon-koung | 31.99 |
| 5 | (Brazil) Gabriela Guimarães | 27.35 |

Best blockers

| Rank | Name | Avg |
|---|---|---|
| 1 | (Brazil) Ana Carolina da Silva | 0.82 |
| 2 | (Brazil) Carol Gattaz | 0.79 |
| 3 | (United States) Foluke Akinradewo | 0.75 |
| 4 | (Serbia) Mina Popović | 0.72 |
| 5 | (United States) Haleigh Washington | 0.71 |

Best servers

| Rank | Name | Avg |
|---|---|---|
| 1 | (Serbia) Tijana Bošković | 0.48 |
| 2 | (Serbia) Maja Ognjenovic | 0.28 |
| 2 | (Serbia) Bianka Buša | 0.28 |
| 4 | (South Korea) Yeum Hye-seon | 0.27 |
| 5 | (Brazil) Carol Gattaz | 0.25 |

Best diggers

| Rank | Name | Avg |
|---|---|---|
| 1 | (South Korea) Oh Ji-young | 3.10 |
| 2 | (United States) Justine Wong-Orantes | 2.93 |
| 2 | (Brazil) Camila Brait | 2.93 |
| 4 | (South Korea) Kim Yeon-koung | 2.77 |
| 5 | (Serbia) Silvija Popović | 2.44 |

Best setters

| Rank | Name | Avg |
|---|---|---|
| 1 | (Serbia) Maja Ognjenović | 9.76 |
| 2 | (United States) Jordyn Poulter | 8.82 |
| 3 | (South Korea) Yeum Hye-seon | 7.43 |
| 4 | (Brazil) Macris Carneiro | 6.54 |
| 5 | (Brazil) Roberta Ratzke | 5.43 |

Best receivers

| Rank | Name | %Succ |
|---|---|---|
| 1 | (United States) Justine Wong-Orantes | 74.45 |
| 2 | (Brazil) Gabriela Guimarães | 71.13 |
| 3 | (United States) Michelle Bartsch-Hackley | 70.59 |
| 4 | (United States) Jordan Larson | 68.35 |
| 5 | (Serbia) Bojana Milenković | 67.43 |

== Final standing ==
| Rank | Team |
|---|---|
| Gold medal | United States |
| Silver medal | Brazil |
| Bronze medal | Serbia |
| 4 | South Korea |
| 5 | Turkey |
| 6 | Italy |
| 7 | ROC |
| 8 | Dominican Republic |
| 9 | China |
| 10 | Japan |
| 11 | Argentina |
| 12 | Kenya |

2020 Women's Olympic champions

United States
1st title

12–woman roster
Micha Hancock, Jordyn Poulter, Justine Wong-Orantes (L), Jordan Larson (c), Annie Drews, Jordan Thompson, Michelle Bartsch-Hackley, Kim Hill, Foluke Akinradewo, Haleigh Washington, Kelsey Robinson, Chiaka Ogbogu
Head coach
Karch Kiraly

== Medalists ==
| Gold | Silver | Bronze |
| United States Micha Hancock; Jordyn Poulter; Justine Wong-Orantes (L); Jordan Larson (c); Annie Drews; Jordan Thompson; Michelle Bartsch-Hackley; Kim Hill; Foluke Akinradewo; Haleigh Washington; Kelsey Robinson; Chiaka Ogbogu Head coach: Karch Kiraly | Brazil Carol Gattaz; Rosamaria Montibeller; Macris Carneiro; Roberta Ratzke; Gabriela Guimarães; Tandara Caixeta; Natália Pereira (c); Ana Carolina da Silva; Fe Garay; Ana Cristina de Souza; Camila Brait (L); Ana Beatriz Corrêa Head coach: Zé Roberto | Serbia Bianka Buša; Mina Popović; Slađana Mirković; Brankica Mihajlović; Maja Ognjenović (c); Ana Bjelica; Maja Aleksić; Milena Rašić; Silvija Popović (L); Tijana Bošković; Bojana Milenković; Jelena Blagojević Head coach: Zoran Terzić |

== Awards ==
The awards were announced on 8 August 2021.

| Position | Player |
|---|---|
| Most valuable player | (United States) Jordan Larson |
| Setter | (United States) Jordyn Poulter |
| Outside hitters | (United States) Jordan Larson |
| Outside hitters | (United States) Michelle Bartsch-Hackley |
| Middle blockers | (United States) Haleigh Washington |
| Middle blockers | (Brazil) Carol Gattaz |
| Opposite spiker | (Serbia) Tijana Bošković |
| Libero | (United States) Justine Wong-Orantes |

== See also ==
- Volleyball at the Summer Olympics
- Volleyball at the 2020 Summer Olympics – Men's tournament
- Beach volleyball at the 2020 Summer Olympics – Women's tournament
- Sitting volleyball at the 2020 Summer Paralympics - Women's tournament
