= Volleyball at the 2020 Summer Olympics – Women's Asian qualification =

2020 Women's Asian Olympic Qualification Tournament
Tournament details
- Host country: Thailand
- City: Nakhon Ratchasima
- Dates: 7–12 January
- Teams: 7 (from 1 confederation)
- Venue: 1 (in 1 host city)

Final positions
- Champions: South Korea (6th title)
- Runners-up: Thailand
- Third place: Kazakhstan
- Fourth place: Chinese Taipei

The 2020 Women's Asian Olympic Qualification Tournament is a volleyball tournament for women's national teams organised by Asian Volleyball Confederation (AVC) and Fédération Internationale de Volleyball (FIVB), to be held in Nakhon Ratchasima, Thailand from 7 to 12 January 2020. 8 teams will play in the tournament, where the winners will qualify to the 2020 women's Olympic volleyball tournament.

== Qualification ==
The maximum of 8 teams in AVC IOQT events will be selected by:

- 8 teams based on the rankings of the 2019 Asian championship.
  - Winners and runners-up of each pool in the preliminary round will qualify.
  - The unused quotas will be reallocated by next ranked teams.

=== Qualified teams ===
Qualified teams
Zone	Team	Qualified as	Qualified on	Previous appearances			Seed
Zone	Team	Qualified as	Qualified on	Total	First	Last	Seed
Central Asia	Kazakhstan	Preliminary Round Pool B runners-up	20 August 2019	2	2008	2016	3
Central Asia	Iran	Preliminary Round Pool A runners-up	20 August 2019	0	–	–	5
East Asia	South Korea	Preliminary Round Pool A winners	18 August 2019	7	1972	2016	2
East Asia	Chinese Taipei	Preliminary Round Pool C runners-up	19 August 2019	3	1996	2012	4
Oceania	Australia	Reallocation of unused quotas	24 August 2019	0	–	–	7
Southeast Asia	Thailand	Preliminary Round Pool C winners	18 August 2019	4	2004	2016	1
Southeast Asia	Indonesia	Preliminary Round Pool D runners-up	20 August 2019	0	–	–	6

=== Unused quotas ===
Qualified teams
Zone	Team	Qualified as (eligible)	Reason of unuse	Reallocation	
Zone	Team	Qualified as (eligible)	Reason of unuse	Team	Qualified as
East Asia	Japan	Preliminary Round Pool B winners	Qualified to the Olympics as the host nation	Australia	9th–12th Classification Round winners
East Asia	China	Preliminary Round Pool D winners	Qualified to the Olympics as the IOQT Pool B winners	India	9th–12th Classification Round runners-up

== Pools composition ==
Teams were seeded in the first two positions of each pool following the serpentine system according to their 2019 Asian Women's Volleyball Championship.

- Pot 1: The two highest-ranked teams
- Pot 2: The next two highest-ranked teams

The remaining two positions of each pool will be randomly drawn. The draw was held in Bangkok, Thailand on 28 October 2019.

- Pot 3: The two qualified teams
- Pot 4: The team that host chose in its pool (pool A).

This meant the 7 teams, qualified and qualifiers, were seeded thus:

Pot 1	Pot 2	Pot 3	Pot 4
1. Thailand (hosts); 2. South Korea	3. Kazakhstan; 4. Chinese Taipei	5. Iran; 6. Indonesia	7. Australia

Draw

== Venue ==
Nakhon Ratchasima, Thailand
Korat Chatchai Hall
Capacity: 5,000
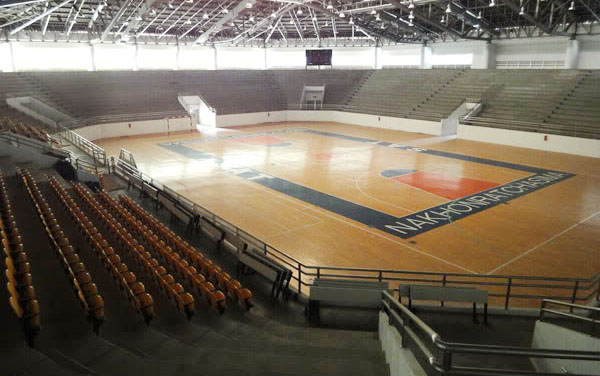

== Pool standing procedure ==
1. Number of matches won
2. Match points
3. Sets ratio
4. Points ratio
5. Result of the last match between the tied teams

Match won 3–0 or 3–1: 3 match points for the winner, 0 match points for the loser
Match won 3–2: 2 match points for the winner, 1 match point for the loser

== Preliminary round ==
- All times are Indochina Time (UTC+07:00).

=== Pool A ===
Pos	Team	Pld	W	L	Pts	SW	SL	SR	SPW	SPL	SPR	Qualification
1	Thailand	2	2	0	6	6	0	MAX	150	93	1.613	Semifinals
2	Chinese Taipei	2	1	1	3	3	3	1.000	128	127	1.008	Semifinals
3	Australia	2	0	2	0	0	6	0.000	92	150	0.613	

Date	Time		Score		Set 1	Set 2	Set 3	Set 4	Set 5	Total	Report
7 Jan	18:00	Chinese Taipei	0–3	Thailand	16–25	21–25	16–25			53–75	Report
8 Jan	18:00	Australia	0–3	Chinese Taipei	20–25	18–25	14–25			52–75	Report
9 Jan	18:00	Thailand	3–0	Australia	25–12	25–15	25–13			75–40	Report

=== Pool B ===
Pos	Team	Pld	W	L	Pts	SW	SL	SR	SPW	SPL	SPR	Qualification
1	South Korea	3	3	0	9	9	0	MAX	225	137	1.642	Semifinals
2	Kazakhstan	3	2	1	6	6	3	2.000	207	182	1.137	Semifinals
3	Indonesia	3	1	2	2	3	8	0.375	210	249	0.843	
4	Iran	3	0	3	1	2	9	0.222	186	260	0.715	

Date	Time		Score		Set 1	Set 2	Set 3	Set 4	Set 5	Total	Report
7 Jan	13:00	Iran	0–3	Kazakhstan	14–25	16–25	14–25			44–75	Report
7 Jan	15:30	South Korea	3–0	Indonesia	25–18	25–10	25–9			75–37	Report
8 Jan	13:00	Indonesia	0–3	Kazakhstan	22–25	23–25	18–25			63–75	Report
8 Jan	15:30	South Korea	3–0	Iran	25–15	25–9	25–19			75–43	Report
9 Jan	13:00	Iran	2–3	Indonesia	21–25	15–25	25–21	26–24	12–15	99–110	Report
9 Jan	15:30	Kazakhstan	0–3	South Korea	20–25	16–25	21–25			57–75	Report

== Final round ==
- All times are Indochina Time (UTC+07:00).

Semi-finals
11 January
South Korea	3
Chinese Taipei	1
11 January
Thailand	3
Kazakhstan	1

Final
12 January
South Korea	3
Thailand	0
Third place
12 January
Chinese Taipei	1
Kazakhstan	3

=== Semi-finals ===
Date	Time		Score		Set 1	Set 2	Set 3	Set 4	Set 5	Total	Report
11 Jan	15:30	South Korea	3–1	Chinese Taipei	18–25	25–9	25–15	25–14		93–63	Report
11 Jan	18:00	Thailand	3–1	Kazakhstan	25–21	25–20	24–26	25–21		99–88	Report

=== 3rd place ===
Date	Time		Score		Set 1	Set 2	Set 3	Set 4	Set 5	Total	Report
12 Jan	15:30	Chinese Taipei	1–3	Kazakhstan	21–25	25–22	21–25	25–27		92–99	Report

=== Final ===
Date	Time		Score		Set 1	Set 2	Set 3	Set 4	Set 5	Total	Report
12 Jan	18:00	South Korea	3–0	Thailand	25–22	25–20	25–20			75–62	Report

== Final standing ==
Rank	Team
1	South Korea
2	Thailand
3	Kazakhstan
4	Chinese Taipei
5	Indonesia
6	Iran
7	Australia

Qualified for the 2020 Olympic Games

== Statistics leaders ==
=== Preliminary round ===
as of January 9, 2020

Best Scorers
	Player	Attacks	Blocks	Serves	Total
1	(Indonesia) Megawati Hangestri Pertiwi	44	1	0	45
2	(Indonesia) Arsela Nuari Purnama	32	3	5	40
3	(South Korea) Lee Jaeyeong	38	0	2	40
4	(Kazakhstan) Sana Anarkulova	34	2	3	39
5	(Iran) Mona Ashofteh	26	2	2	30

Best Attackers
	Player	Spikes	Faults	Shots	Total	%
1	(South Korea) Lee Jaeyeong	38	6	15	59	64.41
2	(Indonesia) Megawati Hangestri Pertiwi	44	19	19	82	53.66
3	(Kazakhstan) Sana Anarkulova	34	11	19	64	53.13
4	(Thailand) Onuma Sittirak	15	3	11	29	51.72
5	(Indonesia) Arsela Nuari Purnama	32	13	17	62	51.61

Best Blockers
	Player	Blocks	Faults	Rebounds	Total	Avg
1	(Kazakhstan) Alessya Safronova	9	13	2	24	1.00
2	(Iran) Haniyeh Mohtasham Pour M.	8	18	4	30	0.73
3	(Australia) Monique Stojanovic	4	15	2	21	0.67
4	(Kazakhstan) Kristina Anikonova	6	12	1	19	0.67
5	(South Korea) Kim Su-ji	6	7	1	14	0.67

Best Servers
	Player	Aces	Faults	Hits	Total	Avg
1	(South Korea) Kang Sohwi	11	4	15	30	1.22
2	(South Korea) Lee Da-yeong	8	2	33	43	0.89
3	(South Korea) Yang Hyo-jin	5	2	30	37	0.56
4	(Iran) Negin Shirtari	6	7	26	39	0.55
5	(Thailand) Onuma Sittirak	3	3	10	16	0.50

Best Setters
	Player	Running	Faults	Still	Total	Avg
1	(Thailand) Nootsara Tomkom	33	1	94	128	5.50
2	(Chinese Taipei) Yi-Chen Hsieh	25	0	154	179	4.17
3	(South Korea) Lee Da-yeong	29	0	142	171	3.22
4	(Indonesia) Tri Retno Mutiara Lutfi	35	4	140	179	3.18
5	(Iran) Negin Shirtari	28	1	146	175	2.55

Best Diggers
	Player	Digs	Faults	Receptions	Total	Avg
1	(Thailand) Yupa Sanitklang	16	2	1	19	2.67
2	(Indonesia) Dita Aziizah	22	13	0	35	2.00
3	(Chinese Taipei) Xiang-Chen Lai	11	13	0	14	1.83
4	(Chinese Taipei) Li-Wen Chang	11	4	0	15	1.83
5	(Chinese Taipei) Yi-Chen Hsieh	10	5	1	16	1.67

Best Receivers
	Player	Excellents	Faults	Serve	Total	%
1	(Chinese Taipei) Tzu Ya Chen	19	1	6	26	69.23
2	(South Korea) Lee Jaeyeong	25	3	4	32	68.75
3	(Chinese Taipei) Li Yun Chang	19	2	5	26	65.38
4	(South Korea) Kang Sohwi	15	2	12	29	44.83
5	(Iran) Mona Ashofteh	34	3	36	73	42.47
