= Volleyball at the 2020 Summer Olympics – Women's African qualification =

2020 Women's African Olympic Qualification Tournament
Tournament details
- Host country: Cameroon
- City: Yaoundé
- Dates: 5–9 January
- Teams: 5 (from 1 confederation)
- Venue: 1 (in 1 host city)

The 2020 Women's African Olympic Qualification Tournament was a volleyball tournament for women's national teams held in Yaoundé, Cameroon from 5 to 9 January 2020. Five teams played in the tournament, where the winner qualified for the 2020 women's Olympic volleyball tournament.

== Pools composition ==
The qualifying tournament featured 5 teams.

- Cameroon
- Botswana
- Egypt
- Kenya
- Nigeria

== Pool standing procedure ==
1. Number of matches won
2. Match points
3. Sets ratio
4. Points ratio
5. Result of the last match between the tied teams

Match won 3–0 or 3–1: 3 match points for the winner, 0 match points for the loser
Match won 3–2: 2 match points for the winner, 1 match point for the loser

== Round robin ==
- All times are Cameroon Standard Time (UTC+01:00).

Pos	Team	Pld	W	L	Pts	SW	SL	SR	SPW	SPL	SPR	Qualification
1	Kenya	4	4	0	11	12	3	4.000	359	283	1.269	2020 Olympic volleyball tournament
2	Cameroon	4	3	1	10	11	3	3.667	325	245	1.327	
3	Egypt	4	2	2	6	7	6	1.167	291	252	1.155	
4	Nigeria	4	1	3	3	3	10	0.300	209	311	0.672	
5	Botswana	4	0	4	0	1	12	0.083	229	322	0.711	

Date	Time		Score		Set 1	Set 2	Set 3	Set 4	Set 5	Total	Report
5 Jan	16:00	Kenya	3–1	Egypt	23–25	25–15	25–21	25–22		98–83	P2 Report
5 Jan	19:00	Botswana	0–3	Cameroon	17–25	4–25	25–27			46–77	P2 Report
6 Jan	16:00	Botswana	0–3	Kenya	17–25	19–25	18–25			54–75	P2 Report
6 Jan	19:00	Nigeria	0–3	Cameroon	12–25	10–25	8–25			30–75	P2 Report
7 Jan	16:00	Nigeria	0–3	Egypt	11–25	12–25	13–25			36–75	P2 Report
7 Jan	19:00	Cameroon	2–3	Kenya	16–25	25–23	21–25	25–23	11–15	98–111	P2 Report
8 Jan	16:00	Botswana	1–3	Nigeria	18–25	25–20	20–25	23–25		86–95	P2 Report
8 Jan	19:00	Egypt	0–3	Cameroon	19–25	22–25	17–25			58–75	P2 Report
9 Jan	16:00	Nigeria	0–3	Kenya	15–25	21–25	12–25			48–75	P2 Report
9 Jan	19:00	Egypt	3–0	Botswana	25–11	25–14	25–18			75–43	P2 Report

== See also ==
- Volleyball at the 2020 Summer Olympics – Men's African qualification
