= Volleyball at the 2020 Summer Olympics – Women's European qualification =

2020 Women's European Olympic Qualification Tournament
Tournament details
- Host country: Netherlands
- City: Apeldoorn
- Dates: 7–12 January
- Teams: 8 (from 1 confederation)
- Venue: 1 (in 1 host city)

Final positions
- Champions: Turkey (1st title)

Tournament awards
- MVP: (Turkey) Meryem Boz

The 2020 Women's European Olympic Qualification Tournament was a volleyball tournament for women's national teams held in Apeldoorn, Netherlands from 7 to 12 January 2020. 8 teams played in the tournament and the winners Turkey qualified to the 2020 Women's Olympic Volleyball Tournament.

== Pools composition ==
The hosts Netherlands and the top seven ranked teams from the CEV National Team Ranking as of 9 September 2019 which had not yet qualified to the 2020 Olympic Games competed in this tournament. Teams were seeded following the Serpentine system. Rankings are shown in brackets.

Pool A	Pool B
Netherlands (3)	Turkey (4)
Bulgaria (7)	Germany (6)
Poland (8)	Belgium (9)
Azerbaijan (11)	Croatia (10)

== Venue ==
All matches
Apeldoorn, Netherlands
Omnisport Arena
Capacity: 5,850
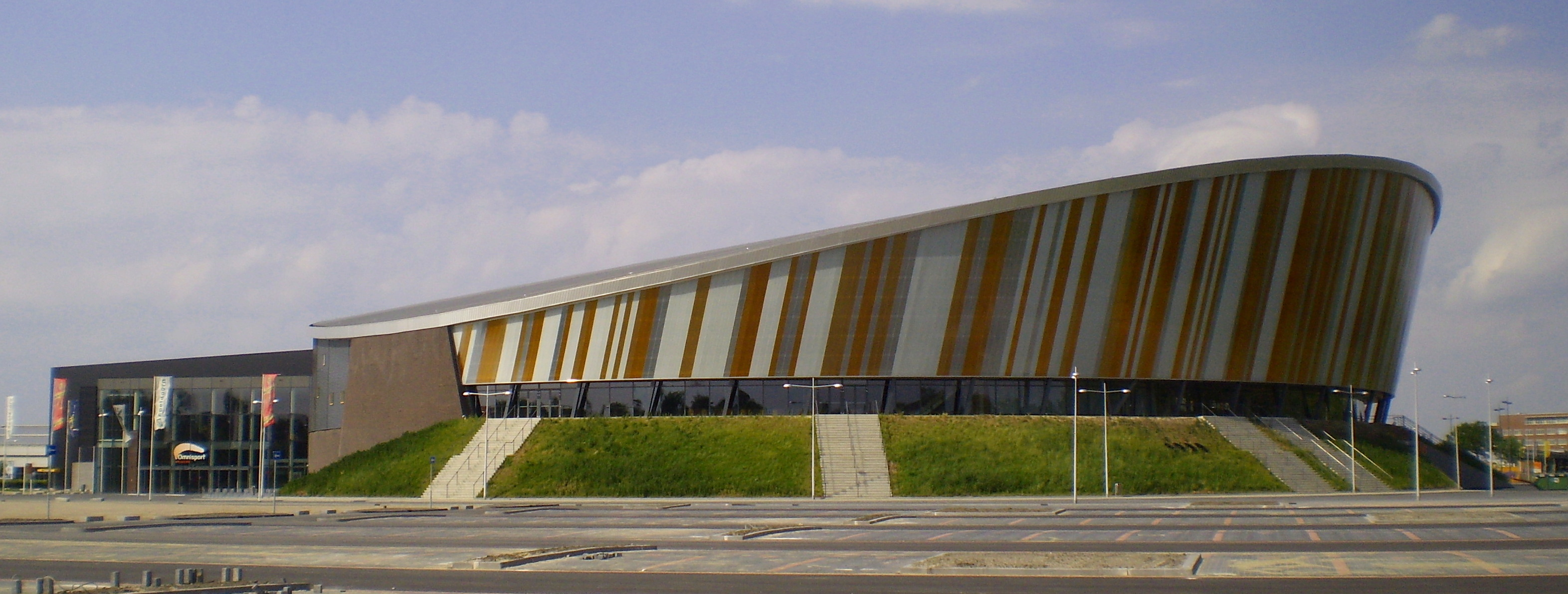

== Pool standing procedure ==
1. Number of matches won
2. Match points
3. Sets ratio
4. Points ratio
5. Result of the last match between the tied teams

Match won 3–0 or 3–1: 3 match points for the winner, 0 match points for the loser
Match won 3–2: 2 match points for the winner, 1 match point for the loser

== Preliminary round ==
- All times are Central European Time (UTC+01:00).

=== Pool A ===
Pos	Team	Pld	W	L	Pts	SW	SL	SR	SPW	SPL	SPR	Qualification
1	Poland	3	3	0	9	9	2	4.500	196	177	1.107	Semifinals
2	Netherlands	3	2	1	6	7	3	2.333	242	223	1.085	Semifinals
3	Bulgaria	3	1	2	3	4	7	0.571	244	263	0.928	
4	Azerbaijan	3	0	3	0	1	9	0.111	152	171	0.889	

Date	Time		Score		Set 1	Set 2	Set 3	Set 4	Set 5	Total	Report
7 Jan	16:00	Poland	3–1	Bulgaria	23–25	25–20	25–19	25–22		98–86	Report
7 Jan	19:30	Azerbaijan	0–3	Netherlands	23–25	18–25	22–25			63–75	Report
8 Jan	19:30	Bulgaria	0–3	Netherlands	19–25	19–25	24–26			62–76	Report
9 Jan	16:00	Bulgaria	3–1	Azerbaijan	25–23	25–19	21–25	25–22		96–89	Report
9 Jan	19:30	Netherlands	1–3	Poland	20–25	23–25	25–23	23–25		91–98	Report
10 Jan	20:00	Poland	3–0	Azerbaijan	25–19	25–19	25–23			75–61	Report

=== Pool B ===
Pos	Team	Pld	W	L	Pts	SW	SL	SR	SPW	SPL	SPR	Qualification
1	Germany	3	3	0	9	9	2	4.500	279	240	1.163	Semifinals
2	Turkey	3	2	1	5	7	6	1.167	290	272	1.066	Semifinals
3	Belgium	3	1	2	4	6	7	0.857	201	197	1.020	
4	Croatia	3	0	3	0	2	9	0.222	225	274	0.821	

Date	Time		Score		Set 1	Set 2	Set 3	Set 4	Set 5	Total	Report
7 Jan	13:00	Germany	3–1	Turkey	25–15	21–25	25–21	25–21		96–82	Report
8 Jan	13:00	Croatia	1–3	Turkey	28–26	12–25	20–25	21–25		81–101	Report
8 Jan	16:00	Belgium	1–3	Germany	31–33	24–26	26–24	22–25		103–108	Report
9 Jan	13:00	Belgium	3–1	Croatia	20–25	28–26	25–16	25–22		98–89	Report
10 Jan	13:30	Germany	3–0	Croatia	25–15	25–17	25–23			75–55	Report
10 Jan	16:30	Turkey	3–2	Belgium	25–20	25–15	20–25	22–25	15–10	107–95	Report

== Final round ==
- All times are Central European Time (UTC+01:00).

Semifinals
11 January
Poland	2
Turkey	3
11 January
Germany	3
Netherlands	0

Final
12 January
Turkey	3
Germany	0

=== Semifinals ===
Date	Time		Score		Set 1	Set 2	Set 3	Set 4	Set 5	Total	Report
11 Jan	17:15	Germany	3–0	Netherlands	27–25	25–23	25–22			77–70	Report
11 Jan	20:45	Poland	2–3	Turkey	25–19	18–25	25–23	31–33	11–15	110–115	Report

=== Final ===
Date	Time		Score		Set 1	Set 2	Set 3	Set 4	Set 5	Total	Report
12 Jan	17:30	Turkey	3–0	Germany	25–17	25–19	25–22			75–58	Report

== Final standing ==
Rank	Team
1	Turkey
2	Germany
3	Poland
4	Netherlands
5	Belgium
6	Bulgaria
7	Croatia
8	Azerbaijan

Qualified for the 2020 Olympic Games

== Individual awards ==
- Most valuable player
  (Turkey) Meryem Boz
- Best setter
  (Poland) Joanna Wołosz
- Best outside spikers
  (Germany) Hanna Orthmann
  (Poland) Magdalena Stysiak
- Best middle blockers
  (Turkey) Eda Erdem Dündar
  (Netherlands) Robin de Kruijf
- Best opposite spiker
  (Germany) Louisa Lippmann
- Best libero
  (Turkey) Simge Şebnem Aköz

== See also ==
- Volleyball at the 2020 Summer Olympics – Men's European qualification
