= Volleyball at the 2020 Summer Olympics – Women's South American qualification =

2020 Women's South American Olympic Qualification Tournament
Tournament details
- Host country: Colombia
- City: Bogotá
- Dates: 7–9 January
- Teams: 4 (from 1 confederation)
- Venue: 1 (in 1 host city)

The 2020 Women's Volleyball South American Olympic Qualification Tournament was a volleyball tournament for women's national teams held in Bogotá, Colombia from 7 to 9 January 2020. 4 teams played in the tournament, where the winner qualified to the 2020 women's Olympic volleyball tournament.

== Qualification ==
The top four teams from the 2019 South American Championship which had not yet qualified to the 2020 Olympic Games qualified for this tournament. Final standings of the 2019 South American Championship are shown in brackets.

- Colombia (2)
- Peru (3)
- Argentina (4)
- Venezuela (5)

== Pool standing procedure ==
1. Number of matches won
2. Match points
3. Sets ratio
4. Points ratio
5. Result of the last match between the tied teams

Match won 3–0 or 3–1: 3 match points for the winner, 0 match points for the loser
Match won 3–2: 2 match points for the winner, 1 match point for the loser

== Round robin ==
- All times are Colombia Time (UTC−05:00).

Pos	Team	Pld	W	L	Pts	SW	SL	SR	SPW	SPL	SPR
1	Argentina	3	3	0	9	9	1	9.000	242	198	1.222
2	Colombia	3	2	1	6	7	3	2.333	238	196	1.214
3	Venezuela	3	1	2	3	3	6	0.500	188	216	0.870
4	Peru	3	0	3	0	0	9	0.000	168	226	0.743

Date	Time		Score		Set 1	Set 2	Set 3	Set 4	Set 5	Total	Report
7 Jan	18:00	Argentina	3–0	Peru	26–24	25–16	25–18			76–58	P2 Report
7 Jan	20:30	Venezuela	0–3	Colombia	26–28	18–25	14–25			58–78	P2 Report
8 Jan	18:00	Argentina	3–0	Venezuela	25–19	25–16	25–20			75–55	P2 Report
8 Jan	20:30	Peru	0–3	Colombia	23–25	12–25	12–25			47–75	P2 Report
9 Jan	18:00	Peru	0–3	Venezuela	18–25	22–25	23–25			63–75	P2 Report
9 Jan	20:30	Argentina	3–1	Colombia	16–25	25–21	25–16	25–23		91–85	P2 Report

== Final standing ==
Rank	Team
1	Argentina
2	Colombia
3	Venezuela
4	Peru

Qualified for the 2020 Olympic Games

== See also ==
- Volleyball at the 2020 Summer Olympics – Men's South American qualification
