= 2025 LOVB Pro season =

Inaugural season of the LOVB Pro

- League: LOVB Pro
- Sport: Volleyball
- Duration: January 8 – April 13
- Teams: 6
- TV partner(s): DAZN; ESPN; LOVB Live; WSN
- Season MVP: Kelsey Cook (ATL)
- Finals champions: LOVB Austin
- Runners-up: LOVB Omaha

The 2025 LOVB Pro season was the inaugural season of the women's volleyball league LOVB Pro. Six teams competed over 14 weeks, including 12 weeks of regular season play, one mid-season tournament (LOVB Classic), and a one-weekend LOVB Finals.

== Teams ==
- 1 LOVB Atlanta
- 2 LOVB Austin
- 3 LOVB Houston
- 4 LOVB Madison
- 5 LOVB Omaha
- 6 LOVB Salt Lake

LOVB Pro's inaugural season did not include a draft; however, it was announced in December 2024 that six rookies (referred to as The LOVB 6) were signed to play with one of the six teams. Three other rookies have joined the league during the league since January 2025. Pittsburgh Panthers alum Rachel Fairbanks was signed by LOVB Atlanta in January. UT Arlington Mavericks alum Paige Reagor joined LOVB Madison in February, after a brief stint at German Bundesliga team Schwarz-Weiss Erfurt. Stanford Cardinals alum Sami Francis joined LOVB Omaha in March.

Team	Head coach	Founding Athlete(s)	LOVB 6 Player	Location	Venue	Capacity	Colors
LOVB Atlanta	Paulo Coco	Kelsey Cook	Onye Ofoegbu	College Park, Georgia	Gateway Center Arena	3,500	
LOVB Austin	~~Marco Bonitta~~; Chris McGown (Note: Marco Bonitta stepped down as LOVB Austin coach on February 18, 2025, and was replaced by Chris McGown.)	Carli Lloyd; Chiaka Ogbogu; Logan Eggleston	Madisen Skinner	Austin, Texas	H-E-B Center; Strahan Arena	8,700; 10,000	
LOVB Houston	Massimo Barbolini	Micha Hancock; Jordan Thompson	Jess Mruzik	Rosenberg, Texas	Fort Bend Epicenter	10,000	
LOVB Madison	Matt Fuerbringer	Lauren Carlini	Sarah Franklin	Madison, Wisconsin	Wisconsin Field House; Alliant Energy Center	7,540; 7,432	
LOVB Omaha	Suzie Fritz	Jordan Larson; Justine Wong-Orantes	Lexi Rodriguez	Omaha, Nebraska	Liberty First Credit Union Arena; Baxter Arena	4,600; 7,898	
LOVB Salt Lake	Tamari Miyashiro	Haleigh Washington; Jordyn Poulter	Sophie Fischer	Salt Lake City, Utah	Lifetime Activities Center; Maverik Center	5,000; 12,500	

=== Rosters ===
LOVB Atlanta
No.	Name	Position	Height	College / Home Club
2	(Thailand) Piyanut Pannoy	Libero	5 ft 6 in (1.68 m)	
3	(Italy) Marta Bechis	Setter	5 ft 11 in (1.80 m)	
4	(Spain) Jessica Rivero Marin	Outside hitter	6 ft 0 in (1.83 m)	
8	(United States) Kayla Haneline	Middle blocker	6 ft 2 in (1.88 m)	Northern Iowa
9	(Poland) Iga Wasilewska	Middle blocker	6 ft 0 in (1.83 m)	Legionovia Legionowo
10	(United States) Madi Bugg	Setter	6 ft 1 in (1.85 m)	Stanford
11	(United States) Onye Ofoegbu	Middle blocker	6 ft 3 in (1.91 m)	Oregon / UC Irvine
12	(United States) Rachel Fairbanks	Setter	6 ft 0 in (1.83 m)	Pittsburgh
13	(United States) McKenzie Adams	Outside hitter	6 ft 4 in (1.93 m)	UTSA
14	(United States) Tia Jimerson	Middle blocker	6 ft 3 in (1.91 m)	Ohio
15	(Czech Republic) Magdalena Jehlárová	Middle blocker	6 ft 3 in (1.91 m)	Washington State
16	(Italy) Beatrice Negretti	Libero	5 ft 7 in (1.70 m)	
17	(United States) Tessa Grubbs	Opposite hitter	6 ft 3 in (1.91 m)	Tennessee
20	(United States) Danielle Cuttino	Opposite hitter	6 ft 4 in (1.93 m)	Purdue
23	(United States) Kelsey Cook	Outside hitter	6 ft 2 in (1.88 m)	Nebraska
77	(United States) Gia Day	Outside hitter	6 ft 2 in (1.88 m)	Maryland / Baylor

LOVB Austin
No.	Name	Position	Height	College / Home Club
1	(United States) Khat Bell	Opposite hitter	6 ft 2 in (1.88 m)	Texas
2	(United States) Leah Hardeman	Outside hitter	5 ft 10 in (1.78 m)	Coastal Carolina
3	(United States) Carli Lloyd	Setter	5 ft 11 in (1.80 m)	California
5	(United States) Molly McCage	Middle blocker	6 ft 4 in (1.93 m)	Texas
6	(Italy) Alessia Gennari	Outside hitter	6 ft 0 in (1.83 m)	
7	(United States) Asjia O'Neal	Middle blocker	6 ft 3 in (1.91 m)	Texas
9	(United States) Saige Ka'aha'aina-Torres	Setter	6 ft 0 in (1.83 m)	Utah / Texas
10	(United States) Zoe Jarvis	Libero	5 ft 7 in (1.70 m)	Texas
11	(United States) Chiaka Ogbogu	Middle blocker	6 ft 2 in (1.88 m)	Texas
12	(United States) Carly DeHoog	Opposite hitter	6 ft 4 in (1.93 m)	Washington
13	(United States) Juliann Faucette	Opposite hitter	6 ft 2 in (1.88 m)	Texas
15	(Japan) Kotoe Inoue	Libero	5 ft 3 in (1.60 m)	
16	(United States) Madisen Skinner	Opposite hitter	6 ft 2 in (1.88 m)	Texas / Kentucky
17	(Sweden) Anna Haak	Outside hitter	5 ft 10 in (1.78 m)	Miami / Marquette
33	(United States) Logan Eggleston	Outside hitter	6 ft 2 in (1.88 m)	Texas

LOVB Houston
No.	Name	Position	Height	College / Home Club
1	(United States) Grace Frohling	Opposite hitter	6 ft 5 in (1.96 m)	San Diego
2	(Slovakia) Karin Palgutová	Outside hitter	6 ft 2 in (1.88 m)	St. John's
3	(United States) Amber Igiede	Middle blocker	6 ft 3 in (1.91 m)	Hawaii
4	(Germany) Anna Pogany	Libero	5 ft 7 in (1.70 m)	
5	(United States) Jess Mruzik	Outside hitter	6 ft 1 in (1.85 m)	Penn State
7	(Italy) Raphaela Folie	Middle blocker	6 ft 1 in (1.85 m)	
8	(France) Christina Bauer	Middle blocker	6 ft 5 in (1.96 m)	ASPTT Mulhouse
9	(United States) Madi Rishel	Outside hitter	6 ft 0 in (1.83 m)	Arizona
10	(Finland) Kaisa Alanko	Setter	5 ft 9 in (1.75 m)	University of Jyväskylä
11	(United States) Anita Anwusi	Middle blocker	6 ft 3 in (1.91 m)	LSU
12	(United States) Micha Hancock	Setter	5 ft 11 in (1.80 m)	Penn State
14	(United States) Julia Brown	Outside hitter	6 ft 1 in (1.85 m)	NC State
17	(Italy) Sara Loda	Outside hitter	5 ft 9 in (1.75 m)	Bergamo
18	(Brazil) Key Alves	Libero	5 ft 5 in (1.65 m)	
23	(United States) Jordan Thompson	Opposite hitter	6 ft 4 in (1.93 m)	Cincinnati

LOVB Madison
No.	Name	Position	Height	College / Home Club
1	(Puerto Rico) Daly Santana	Outside hitter	6 ft 1 in (1.85 m)	Minnesota
2	(United States) Anna Hall	Middle blocker	6 ft 2 in (1.88 m)	Louisville
3	(United States) Mariena Hayden	Outside hitter	6 ft 0 in (1.83 m)	UNLV
4	(Serbia) Milica Medved	Libero	5 ft 11 in (1.80 m)	
5	(China) Simin Wang	Libero	5 ft 5 in (1.65 m)	
6	(Germany) Jennifer Janiska	Outside hitter	6 ft 0 in (1.83 m)	
7	(United States) Lauren Carlini	Setter	6 ft 1 in (1.85 m)	Wisconsin
8	(United States) Claire Felix	Middle blocker	6 ft 6 in (1.98 m)	UCLA
9	(United States) Claire Chaussee	Outside hitter	6 ft 0 in (1.83 m)	Louisville
10	(United States) Taylor Sandbothe	Middle blocker	6 ft 2 in (1.88 m)	Ohio State
11	(United States) Annie Schumacher	Opposite hitter	6 ft 4 in (1.93 m)	Purdue
12	(United States) Temi Thomas-Ailara	Opposite hitter	6 ft 2 in (1.88 m)	Wisconsin / Northwestern
13	(United States) Sarah Franklin	Outside hitter	6 ft 4 in (1.93 m)	Wisconsin / Michigan State
14	(Serbia) Danica Markovic	Setter	6 ft 1 in (1.85 m)	
15	(United States) Paige Reagor	Middle blocker	6 ft 6 in (1.98 m)	UT Arlington
27	(Brazil) Ana Beatriz Corrêa	Middle blocker	6 ft 2 in (1.88 m)	

LOVB Omaha
No.	Name	Position	Height	College / Home Club
1	(United States) Lexi Rodriguez	Libero	5 ft 5 in (1.65 m)	Nebraska
2	(United States) Emily Thater	Middle blocker	6 ft 3 in (1.91 m)	Missouri
3	(Germany) Annie Cesar	Libero	5 ft 8 in (1.73 m)	
4	(United States) Justine Wong-Orantes	Libero	5 ft 6 in (1.68 m)	Nebraska
5	(United States) Jaali Winters	Outside hitter	6 ft 3 in (1.91 m)	Creighton
7	(Canada) Vicky Savard	Outside hitter	6 ft 1 in (1.85 m)	Montréal
8	(Germany) Kimberly Drewniok	Opposite hitter	6 ft 2 in (1.88 m)	RC Sorpesee
10	(United States) Jordan Larson	Outside hitter	6 ft 2 in (1.88 m)	Nebraska
11	(United States) Amber Stivrins	Outside hitter	6 ft 2 in (1.88 m)	Louisville / Georgia / San Diego
12	(United States) Audriana Fitzmorris	Opposite hitter	6 ft 6 in (1.98 m)	Stanford
13	(United States) Gabby Blossom	Setter	5 ft 9 in (1.75 m)	San Diego / Penn State
14	(Netherlands) Laura Dijkema	Setter	6 ft 0 in (1.83 m)	Smash
17	(Argentina) Candelaria Herrera	Middle blocker	6 ft 0 in (1.83 m)	Florida A&M / Iowa State
18	(United States) Sami Francis	Middle blocker	6 ft 6 in (1.98 m)	Stanford
23	(United States) Chiamaka Nwokolo	Middle blocker	6 ft 1 in (1.85 m)	Pittsburgh
26	(United States) Lauren Stivrins	Middle blocker	6 ft 4 in (1.93 m)	Nebraska
33	(United States) Madi Kubik-Banks	Outside hitter	6 ft 3 in (1.91 m)	Nebraska

LOVB Salt Lake
No.	Name	Position	Height	College / Home Club
1	(United States) Jordyn Poulter	Setter	6 ft 2 in (1.88 m)	Illinois
2	(Japan) Tamaki Matsui	Setter	5 ft 7 in (1.70 m)	JWCPE
3	(United States) Morgan Miller	Outside hitter	6 ft 3 in (1.91 m)	California
4	(United States) Maddie Haynes	Outside hitter	6 ft 4 in (1.93 m)	California
5	(United States) Skylar Fields	Opposite hitter	6 ft 3 in (1.91 m)	USC
6	(United States) Tori Dixon	Middle blocker	6 ft 3 in (1.91 m)	Minnesota
7	(United States) Sophie Fischer	Middle blocker	6 ft 5 in (1.96 m)	Georgia
11	(United States) Serena Gray	Middle blocker	6 ft 2 in (1.88 m)	Pittsburgh
12	(United States) Roni Jones-Perry	Outside hitter	6 ft 0 in (1.83 m)	BYU
15	(United States) Haleigh Washington	Middle blocker	6 ft 3 in (1.91 m)	Penn State
16	(Japan) Manami Kojima	Libero	5 ft 2 in (1.57 m)	Aoyama Gakuin
17	(United States) Dani Drews	Outside hitter	6 ft 0 in (1.83 m)	Utah
18	(United States) Mary Lake	Libero	5 ft 7 in (1.70 m)	BYU
21	(United States) Claire Hoffman	Outside hitter	6 ft 2 in (1.88 m)	Washington
33	(Cuba) Heidy Casanova	Opposite hitter	6 ft 0 in (1.83 m)	

== Regular season ==
=== Schedule format ===
- Each team played 16 regular games - 3 games each with 4 of the opponent teams, and 4 games with the remaining one opponent.
- Four games were played each week:
  - One weekday head-to-head match between two teams at one LOVB city.
  - One weekend three-match series between four teams at one LOVB city (billed by the league as "Weekends with LOVB"), with a single match on Friday and a double-header on Saturday.
- Each LOVB city hosted a total of 8 regular season matches.
- All 6 LOVB Pro teams qualified for the season-ending LOVB finals, with the top-2 ranked teams in the final regular season standings earning byes into the semifinals, while the remaining 4 teams played in the quarterfinals.

=== Schedule and results ===
2025 LOVB Pro Season
Week 1

Date	Time	Matchup			City	Set 1	Set 2	Set 3	Set 4	Set 5	TV	Venue
Wednesday, January 8	7:30 PM (ET)	Atlanta	1–**3**	Salt Lake	College Park, GA	22–**25**	25–**27**	**25**–21	21–**25**		LOVB Live	Gateway Center Arena
Thursday, January 9	7:00 PM (CT)	Houston	**3**–2	Austin	Rosenberg, TX	25–**27**	24–**26**	**25**–22	**27**–25	**16**–14	LOVB Live	Fort Bend Epicenter
Friday, January 10	4:30 PM (CT)	Austin	**3**–0	Madison	Rosenberg, TX	**25**–21	**25**–23	**25**–18			LOVB Live	Fort Bend Epicenter
Friday, January 10	7:00 PM (CT)	Houston	0–**3**	Omaha	Rosenberg, TX	19–**25**	20–**25**	26–**28**			LOVB Live	Fort Bend Epicenter

Week 2

Date	Time	Matchup			City	Set 1	Set 2	Set 3	Set 4	Set 5	TV	Venue
Wednesday, January 15	7:00 PM (CT)	Austin	1–**3**	Atlanta	Cedar Park, TX	**25**–18	23–**25**	24–**25**	21–**25**		LOVB Live; DAZN	H-E-B Center
Friday, January 17	8:00 PM (CT)	Madison	**3**–2	Salt Lake	Madison, WI	**26**–24	19–**25**	**25**–19	16–**25**	**15**–13	LOVB Live	Wisconsin Field House
Saturday, January 18	6:00 PM (CT)	Salt Lake	1–**3**	Houston	Madison, WI	9–**25**	16–**25**	**27**–25	12–**25**		LOVB Live	Wisconsin Field House
Saturday, January 18	9:00 PM (CT)	Madison	1–**3**	Omaha	Madison, WI	**25**–20	24–**26**	15–**25**	15–**25**		LOVB Live	Wisconsin Field House

Week 3

Date	Time	Matchup			City	Set 1	Set 2	Set 3	Set 4	Set 5	TV	Venue
Wednesday, January 22	7:00 PM (MT)	Salt Lake	**3**–1	Houston	Taylorsville, UT	22–**25**	**25**–15	**26**–24	**25**–19		LOVB Live; DAZN	Bruin Arena
Friday, January 24	7:00 PM (CT)	Omaha	**3**–1	Madison	Ralston, NE	**25**–20	24–**26**	**25**–18	**25**–23		LOVB Live	Liberty First Credit Union Arena
Saturday, January 25	4:30 PM (CT)	Madison	2–**3**	Atlanta	Ralston, NE	21–**25**	**25**–18	17–**25**	**25**–20	10–**15**	LOVB Live; WSN	Liberty First Credit Union Arena
Saturday, January 25	7:24 PM (CT)	Omaha	0–**3**	Austin	Ralston, NE	23–**25**	20–**25**	15–**25**			LOVB Live; WSN	Liberty First Credit Union Arena

Week 4

Date	Time	Matchup			City	Set 1	Set 2	Set 3	Set 4	Set 5	TV	Venue
Wednesday, January 29	7:00 PM (CT)	Madison	0–**3**	Houston	Madison, WI	19–**25**	17–**25**	21–**25**			LOVB Live; DAZN	Alliant Energy Center
Friday, January 31	7:30 PM (ET)	Atlanta	**3**–0	Salt Lake	College Park, GA	**25**–22	**25**–22	**25**–20			ESPN+	Gateway Center Arena
Saturday, February 1	4:30 PM (ET)	Salt Lake	**3**–2	Austin	College Park, GA	22–**25**	**25**–19	20–**25**	**27**–25	**15**–12	LOVB Live; WSN	Gateway Center Arena
Saturday, February 1	7:00 PM (ET)	Atlanta	**3**–1	Omaha	College Park, GA	21–**25**	**25**–22	**25**–22	**25**–20		LOVB Live; WSN	Gateway Center Arena

Week 5

Date	Time	Matchup			City	Set 1	Set 2	Set 3	Set 4	Set 5	TV	Venue
Wednesday, February 5	7:00 PM (CT)	Austin	1–**3**	Houston	Cedar Park, TX	**33**–31	23–**25**	21–**25**	16–**25**		YouTube; LOVB Live; WSN	H-E-B Center
Friday, February 7	7:00 PM (MT)	Salt Lake	1–**3**	Atlanta	West Valley City, UT	20–**25**	**25**–23	18–**25**	18–**25**		YouTube; LOVB Live; DAZN	Maverik Center
Saturday, February 8	4:30 PM (MT)	Atlanta	**3**–0	Madison	West Valley City, UT	**25**–20	**25**–15	**25**–21			YouTube; LOVB Live; WSN	Maverik Center
Saturday, February 8	7:00 PM (MT)	Salt Lake	2–**3**	Omaha	West Valley City, UT	17–**25**	21–**25**	**25**–18	**25**–19	12–**15**	YouTube; LOVB Live; WSN	Maverik Center

Week 6 (LOVB Classic)

Date	Time	Matchup			City	Set 1	Set 2	Set 3	Set 4	Set 5	TV	Venue
Friday, February 14 quarterfinal	4:30 PM (CT)	Madison	0–**3**	Houston	Kansas City, MO	20–**25**	23–**25**	18–**25**			ESPN+	Municipal Arena
Friday, February 14 quarterfinal	7:00 PM (CT)	Austin	**3**–1	Salt Lake	Kansas City, MO	**26**–24	**25**–14	19–**25**	**25**–22		ESPN+	Municipal Arena
Saturday, February 15 semifinal	4:30 PM (CT)	Houston	**3**–1	Omaha	Kansas City, MO	**25**–20	**25**–17	18–**25**	**25**–21		ESPN+	Municipal Arena
Saturday, February 15 semifinal	7:00 PM (CT)	Austin	1–**3**	Atlanta	Kansas City, MO	15–**25**	**25**–22	23–**25**			ESPN+	Municipal Arena
Sunday, February 16; 5th place	2:00 PM (CT)	Madison	1–**3**	Salt Lake	Kansas City, MO	**25**–17	21–**25**	19–**25**	17–**25**		ESPN+	Municipal Arena
Sunday, February 16; 3rd place	5:00 PM (CT)	Omaha	1–**3**	Austin	Kansas City, MO	**25**–23	24–**26**	19–**25**	19–25		ESPN+ ESPNU	Municipal Arena
Sunday, February 16 final	7:30 PM (CT)	Houston	**3**–1	Atlanta	Kansas City, MO	**25**–23	25–**27**	**25**–20	**29**–27		ESPN+ ESPN2	Municipal Arena

Week 7

Date	Time	Matchup			City	Set 1	Set 2	Set 3	Set 4	Set 5	TV	Venue
Wednesday, February 19	7:00 PM ( CT )	Austin	**3**–1	Houston	Cedar Park, TX	**25** – 20	19 – **25**	**25** – 18	**26** – 24		YouTube; LOVB Live; DAZN	H-E-B Center
Thursday, February 20	4:30 PM ( CT )	Houston	**3** – 0	Omaha	Cedar Park, TX	**26** – 24	**25** – 23	**25** – 16			YouTube; LOVB Live; DAZN	H-E-B Center
Thursday, February 20	7:00 PM ( CT )	Austin	**3** – 1	Salt Lake	Cedar Park, TX	**25** – 21	**25** – 22	21 – **25**	**25** – 21		YouTube; LOVB Live; DAZN	H-E-B Center
Friday, February 21	7:30 PM ( ET )	Atlanta	**3** – 2	Madison	College Park, GA	**25** – 15	**25** – 21	23 – **25**	23 – **25**	**15** – 7	YouTube; LOVB Live; DAZN	Gateway Center Arena

Week 8

Date	Time	Matchup			City	Set 1	Set 2	Set 3	Set 4	Set 5	TV	Venue
Thursday, February 27	7:00 PM (CT)	Houston	0– **3**	Salt Lake	Rosenberg, TX	17– **25**	21– **25**	21– **25**			YouTube; LOVB Live; DAZN	Fort Bend Epicenter
Friday, February 28	7:00 PM (CT)	Madison	**3** –1	Omaha	Madison, WI	18– **25**	**25** –22	**25** –16	**25** –21		YouTube; LOVB Live; WSN	Alliant Energy Center
Saturday, March 1	4:30 PM (CT)	Omaha	2– **3**	Atlanta	Madison, WI	**25** –21	**27** –25	19– **25**	13– **25**	12– **15**	YouTube; LOVB Live; WSN	Alliant Energy Center
Saturday, March 1	7:00 PM (CT)	Madison	**3** –0	Austin	Madison, WI	**25** –22	**25** –21	**25** –17			YouTube; LOVB Live; WSN	Alliant Energy Center

Week 9

Date	Time	Matchup			City	Set 1	Set 2	Set 3	Set 4	Set 5	TV	Venue
Thursday, March 6	8:00 PM (CT)	Omaha	1– **3**	Salt Lake	Ralston, NE	**25** –16	23– **25**	23– **25**	19– **25**		ESPNU; ESPN+	Liberty First Credit Union Arena
Friday, March 7	7:30 PM (ET)	Atlanta	2– **3**	Houston	College Park, GA	**25** –21	**25** –18	21– **25**	17– **25**	10– **15**	YouTube; LOVB Live; DAZN	Gateway Center Arena
Saturday, March 8	4:30 PM (ET)	Houston	1– **3**	Madison	College Park, GA	**25** –19	26– **28**	26– **28**	16– **25**		YouTube; LOVB Live; WSN	Gateway Center Arena
Saturday, March 8	7:00 PM (ET)	Atlanta	**3** –1	Austin	College Park, GA	**25** –22	24– **26**	**25** –15	**27** –25		YouTube; LOVB Live; WSN	Gateway Center Arena

Week 10

Date	Time	Matchup			City	Set 1	Set 2	Set 3	Set 4	Set 5	TV	Venue
Thursday, March 13	7:00 PM (CT)	Madison	**3** –1	Omaha	Madison, WI	**25** –16	**25** –17	26– **28**	**25** –16		YouTube; LOVB Live; DAZN	Alliant Energy Center
Friday, March 14	7:00 PM (CT)	Houston	**3** –2	Atlanta	Rosenberg, TX	**25** –23	**25** –23	15– **25**	19– **25**	**15** –8	ESPN+	Fort Bend Epicenter
Saturday, March 15	4:30 PM (CT)	Atlanta	**3** –2	Salt Lake	Rosenberg, TX	**25** –17	23– **25**	**25** –18	23– **25**	**15** –11	YouTube; LOVB Live; WSN	Fort Bend Epicenter
Saturday, March 15	7:00 PM (CT)	Houston	**3** –1	Austin	Rosenberg, TX	**27** –25	**25** –18	19– **25**	**25** –22		YouTube; LOVB Live; WSN	Fort Bend Epicenter

Week 11

Date	Time	Matchup			City	Set 1	Set 2	Set 3	Set 4	Set 5	TV	Venue
Thursday, March 20	7:00 PM (MT)	Salt Lake	2- **3**	Madison	Taylorsville, UT	**25** -20	15- **25**	**25** -17	30- **32**	7- **15**	YouTube; LOVB Live; DAZN	Bruin Arena
Friday, March 21	7:00 PM (CT)	Omaha	2- **3**	Austin	Omaha, NE	**26** -24	20- **25**	15- **25**	**25** -23	16- **18**	ESPN+	Baxter Arena
Saturday, March 22	4:30 PM (CT)	Austin	0- **3**	Atlanta	Omaha, NE	19- **25**	21- **25**	15- **25**			YouTube; LOVB Live; WSN	Baxter Arena
Saturday, March 22	7:00 PM (CT)	Omaha	1- **3**	Houston	Omaha, NE	21- **25**	18- **25**	**25** -23	23- **25**		YouTube; LOVB Live; WSN	Baxter Arena

Week 12

Date	Time	Matchup			City	Set 1	Set 2	Set 3	Set 4	Set 5	TV	Venue
Thursday, March 27, 2025	7:00 PM (CT)	Houston	1– **3**	Atlanta	Rosenberg, TX	**25** –13	21– **25**	21– **25**	20– **25**		YouTube; LOVB Live; DAZN	Fort Bend Epicenter
Friday, March 28, 2025	7:00 PM (CT)	Austin	2– **3**	Omaha	San Marcos, TX	23– **25**	**25** –17	16– **25**	**25** –23	12– **15**	ESPN+	Strahan Arena
Saturday, March 29, 2025	6:00 PM (CT)	Omaha	2– **3**	Salt Lake	San Marcos, TX	**26** –24	**33** –31	19– **25**	15– **25**	11– **15**	ESPN+	Strahan Arena
Saturday, March 29, 2025	9:00 PM (CT)	Austin	2– **3**	Madison	San Marcos, TX	**25** –22	23– **25**	12– **25**	**25** –23	11– **15**	ESPN2; ESPN+	Strahan Arena

Week 13

Date	Time	Matchup			City	Set 1	Set 2	Set 3	Set 4	Set 5	TV	Venue
Thursday, April 3, 2025	7:00 PM (CT)	Omaha	0– **3**	Atlanta	Ralston, NE	23– **25**	23– **25**	19– **25**			YouTube; LOVB Live; DAZN	Liberty First Credit Union Arena
Friday, April 4, 2025	8:00 PM (MT)	Salt Lake	1– **3**	Madison	Taylorsville, UT	24– **26**	22– **25**	**25** –21	21– **25**		ESPNU; ESPN+	Bruin Arena
Saturday, April 5, 2025	4:30 PM (MT)	Madison	0– **3**	Houston	Taylorsville, UT	20– **25**	19– **25**	21– **25**			YouTube; LOVB Live; DAZN	Bruin Arena
Saturday, April 5, 2025	7:00 PM (MT)	Salt Lake	**3** –2	Austin	Taylorsville, UT	18– **25**	**25** –16	23– **25**	**25** –17	**15** –13	YouTube; LOVB Live; DAZN	Bruin Arena

Week 14 (LOVB Finals)

Date	Time	Matchup			City	Set 1	Set 2	Set 3	Set 4	Set 5	TV	Venue
Thursday, April 10, 2025 quarterfinal #1	4:30 PM (ET)	Salt Lake	2–**3**	**Austin**	Louisville, KY	**26**–24	**26**–24	25–**27**	23–**25**	16–**18**	ESPN+	KFC Yum! Center
Thursday, April 10, 2025 quarterfinal #2	7:00 PM (ET)	Madison	1–**3**	**Omaha**	Louisville, KY	17–**25**	**25**–18	18–**25**	21–**25**	–	ESPN+	KFC Yum! Center
Friday, April 11, 2025 semifinal #1	7:00 PM (ET)	Austin	**3**–2	Atlanta	Louisville, KY	21–**25**	21–**25**	**25**–22	**25**–10	**16**–14	ESPN2; ESPN+	KFC Yum! Center
Friday, April 11, 2025 semifinal #2	9:30 PM (ET)	Omaha	**3**–2	Houston	Louisville, KY	15–**25**	24–**26**	**25**–23	**25**–23	**15**–12	ESPN2; ESPN+	KFC Yum! Center
Sunday, April 13, 2025 league championship	4:00 PM (ET)	Omaha	0–**3**	Austin	Louisville, KY	19–**25**	22–**25**	23–**25**	–	–	ESPN2; ESPN+	KFC Yum! Center

=== Standings ===
Matches in the LOVB Classic (see below) did not count toward the regular season standings or tiebreakers.

#	Team	MP	W	L	W%	Sets	S%	Points	P%	H	A	N
1	LOVB Atlanta	16	13	3	.813	44 – 22	.667	1508 – 1372	.524	4 – 2	4 – 1	5 – 0
2	LOVB Houston	16	10	6	.625	34 – 28	.548	1418 – 1366	.509	3 – 3	4 – 2	3 – 1
3	LOVB Madison	16	8	8	.500	30 – 34	.469	1378 – 1419	.493	4 – 2	3 – 2	1 – 4
4	LOVB Salt Lake	16	7	9	.438	33 – 36	.478	1491 – 1520	.495	2 – 4	3 – 3	2 – 2
5	LOVB Austin	16	5	11	.313	29 – 37	.439	1450 – 1490	.493	2 – 4	2 – 5	1 – 2
6	LOVB Omaha	16	5	11	.313	26 – 39	.400	1405 – 1483	.486	1 – 5	4 – 3	0 – 3

=== Standings procedure ===
The ranking of teams in the LOVB regular season standings were determined as follows:

- Each team will be ranked by their match win percentage (matches won divided by total matches played).
- If two teams are tied, the following tie-breakers will be applied in this order:
1. Head-to-Head (H2H) win ratio
2. H2H set ratio (sets won divided by sets played)
3. H2H point ratio (points won divided by total points)
4. Total set ratio against all opponents
5. Total point ratio against all opponents
- If more than two teams are tied, the following tie-breakers will be applied:
1. Win ratio, only including games played between tied teams
2. Set ratio, only including games played between tied teams
3. Point ratio, only including games played between tied teams
4. If one team is eliminated from the multiple-team H2H tie, the tie-breaking process will revert to the top of the multiple-team H2H process, or to the top of the two-team H2H process if only two teams remain.

==== Head-to-Head ====
	**vs.** **ATL**			**vs.** **ATX**			**vs.** **HTX**			**vs.** **MAD**			**vs.** **OMA**			**vs.** **SLC**		
	**WL**	**S%**	**P%**	**WL**	**S%**	**P%**	**WL**	**S%**	**P%**	**WL**	**S%**	**P%**	**WL**	**S%**	**P%**	**WL**	**S%**	**P%**
LOVB Atlanta				**3–0**	.818	.533	1–2	.500	.500	**3–0**	.692	.539	**3–0**	.750	.530	**3–1**	.625	.527
LOVB Austin	0–3	.182	.467				1–3	.412	.494	1–2	.455	.483	**2–1**	.615	.523	1–2	.500	.495
LOVB Houston	**2–1**	.500	.500	**3–1**	.588	.506				**2–1**	.700	.528	**2–1**	.600	.512	1–2	.364	.505
LOVB Madison	0–3	.308	.461	**2–1**	.545	.517	1–2	.300	.472				2–2	.500	**.503**	**3–0**	.643	.506
LOVB Omaha	0–3	.250	.470	1–2	.385	.477	1–2	.400	.488	2–2	.500	.497				1–2	.429	.488
LOVB Salt Lake	1–3	.375	.473	**2–1**	.500	.505	**2–1**	.636	.495	0–3	.357	.494	**2–1**	.571	.512			

When reading across the table, a team would win the H2H tie-breaker based on values in boldface font, while they would lose the tie-breaker based on values in italicized font.

== LOVB Classic ==
The inaugural mid-season LOVB Classic tournament was held at Kansas City, Missouri on Valentine's Day weekend, February 14-16, 2025. It was announced that the top three teams would be awarded with a cash prize of $100,000, $40,000, and $20,000, respectively.

Teams were seeded for the LOVB Classic based on league standings after Week 5.

- In Friday's quarterfinals, #3 Houston defeated #6 Madison, and #5 Austin upset #4 Salt Lake.
- Saturday's semifinals featured another upset win, with #3 Houston defeating #2 Omaha in the first match. In the second semifinal, #1 seed Atlanta defeated #5 Austin and advanced to the final.
- Sunday started with the 5th place match where #4 Salt Lake won against #6 Madison. In the 3rd place match, #5 Austin prevailed over #2 Omaha to win a $20,000 prize. The final match was another upset, with #3 Houston defeating #1 seed Atlanta. Atlanta took second place, and won $40,000. Houston won the inaugural LOVB Classic title along with the $100,000 prize.

=== Bracket ===
Quarterfinals
#6 LOVB Madison	0	20	23	18
#3 LOVB Houston	3	25	25	25
#5 LOVB Austin	3	26	25	19	25
#4 LOVB Salt Lake	1	24	14	25	22

Semifinals
#3 LOVB Houston	3	25	17	25	25
#2 LOVB Omaha	1	20	25	18	21
#5 LOVB Austin	1	15	25	23	20
#1 LOVB Atlanta	3	25	22	25	25

Final
#3 LOVB Houston	3	25	25	25	29
#1 LOVB Atlanta	1	23	27	20	27
Third place
#5 LOVB Austin	3	23	26	25	25
#2 LOVB Omaha	1	25	24	19	19

=== All-Tournament Team ===
All-tournament team was announced after LOVB Classic's final match.

Position	Player	Team
MVP	(United States) Jordan Thompson	LOVB Houston
Opposite Hitter	(United States) Jordan Thompson	LOVB Houston
Setter	(United States) Micha Hancock	LOVB Houston
Middle Blocker	(United States) Amber Igiede	LOVB Houston
Outside Hitter	(United States) Logan Eggleston	LOVB Austin
Libero	(Thailand) Piyanut Pannoy	LOVB Atlanta

== 2025 LOVB Finals ==
The 2025 LOVB finals were held at KFC Yum! Center in Louisville, Kentucky on April 10-13, 2025. LOVB Austin won the championship match in a 3-set sweep of LOVB Omaha, with Logan Eggleston and Madisen Skinner leading the scoring for Austin with 22 and 21 points, respectively. Austin also had a 16–3 advantage in blocks. Both Austin and Omaha (respectively the 5th and 6th seeds in the Finals) reached the championship after "reverse sweep" semifinal wins, with Austin coming back from a 2-set deficit to beat top-seed LOVB Atlanta and Omaha doing the same against #2 seed LOVB Houston. Austin's reverse sweep in the semis was its second of the Finals tournament, as they also came back from 0–2 down to top #4 seed LOVB Salt Lake in the quarterfinals; Omaha defeated #3 seed LOVB Madison in 4 sets in the quarters.

=== Bracket ===
Quarterfinals
#6 LOVB Omaha	3	25	18	25	25	-
#3 LOVB Madison	1	17	25	18	21	-
#5 LOVB Austin	3	24	24	27	25	18
#4 LOVB Salt Lake	2	26	26	25	23	16

Semifinals
#6 LOVB Omaha	3	15	24	25	25	15
#2 LOVB Houston	2	25	26	23	23	12
#5 LOVB Austin	3	21	21	25	25	16
#1 LOVB Atlanta	2	25	25	22	10	14

Final
#6 LOVB Omaha	0	19	22	23	-	-
#5 LOVB Austin	3	25	25	25	-	-

=== Final standing ===
Rank	Team
	LOVB Austin
2	LOVB Omaha
3	LOVB Atlanta
3	LOVB Houston
5	LOVB Salt Lake
5	LOVB Madison

2025 LOVB Pro League Champions
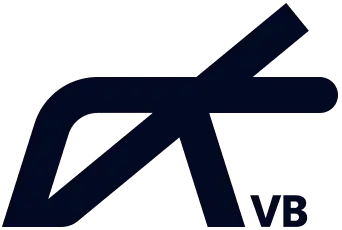
LOVB Austin
1st Title

Championship Roster
Alessia Gennari, Anna Haak, Asjia O'Neal, Carli Lloyd, Carly DeHoog, Chiaka Ogbogu, Juliann Faucette, Khat Bell, Kotoe Inoue, Leah Hardeman, Logan Eggleston, Madisen Skinner, Molly McCage, Saige Ka'aha'aina-Torres, Zoe Jarvis
Head coach
Chris McGown

== Awards ==
=== Weekly awards ===
Save for one week during the regular season, two players (one offensive, one defensive) were awarded with LOVB Players of the Week. The exception was for the LOVB Classic in Week 6, where in addition to an All-Tournament team (see above), one player was awarded the tournament's Most Valuable Player.

Week	Offensive	Defensive
1	(United States) Jaali Winters; LOVB Omaha	(Japan) Manami Kojima; LOVB Salt Lake
2	(United States) Micha Hancock; LOVB Houston	(United States) Justine Wong-Orantes; LOVB Omaha
3	(United States) Skylar Fields; LOVB Salt Lake	(Thailand) Piyanut Pannoy; LOVB Atlanta
4	(United States) Skylar Fields; LOVB Salt Lake	(United States) Madi Rishel; LOVB Houston
5	(United States) Tessa Grubbs; LOVB Atlanta	(United States) Madi Rishel; LOVB Houston
6 LOVB Classic MVP	(United States) Jordan Thompson; LOVB Houston	
7	(United States) Jordan Thompson; LOVB Houston	(Japan) Kotoe Inoue; LOVB Austin
8	(United States) Annie Drews Schumacher; LOVB Madison	(Czech Republic) Magdalena Jehlárová; LOVB Atlanta
9	(United States) Jordyn Poulter; LOVB Salt Lake	(Serbia) Milica Medved; LOVB Madison
10	(United States) Lauren Carlini; LOVB Madison	(United States) Kelsey Cook; LOVB Atlanta
11	(United States) Annie Drews Schumacher; LOVB Madison	(United States) Chiaka Ogbogu; LOVB Austin
12	(United States) Annie Drews Schumacher; LOVB Madison	(Japan) Manami Kojima; LOVB Salt Lake
13	(United States) Micha Hancock; LOVB Houston	(Italy) Raphaela Folie; LOVB Houston
14 LOVB Finals MVP	(United States) Madisen Skinner; LOVB Austin	

=== Season awards ===
The following awards were announced by LOVB Pro on April 9, 2025:

Award	Winner	Team
Most Valuable Player	(United States) Kelsey Cook	LOVB Atlanta
Middle Blocker of the Year	(United States) Chiaka Ogbogu	LOVB Austin
Libero of the Year	(Japan) Manami Kojima	LOVB Salt Lake
Opposite Hitter of the Year	(United States) Jordan Thompson	LOVB Houston
Outside Hitter of the Year	(United States) McKenzie Adams	LOVB Atlanta
Setter of the Year	(United States) Lauren Carlini	LOVB Madison
Coach of the Year	(Brazil) Paulo Coco	LOVB Atlanta

=== 2025 LOVB Icons ===
All-star teams, dubbed "LOVB Icons", were determined by a weighted voting system selected by fans (50%), players (25%), and coaches (25%), and were announced on April 7, 2025.

==== First Team ====
Position	Player	Team
Outside Hitters	(United States) Kelsey Cook	LOVB Atlanta
Outside Hitters	(United States) Jess Mruzik	LOVB Houston
Middle Blockers	(United States) Amber Igiede	LOVB Houston
Middle Blockers	(United States) Chiaka Ogbogu	LOVB Austin
Setter	(United States) Lauren Carlini	LOVB Madison
Opposite Hitter	(United States) Annie Drews Schumacher	LOVB Madison
Libero	(United States) Lexi Rodriguez	LOVB Omaha

==== Second Team ====
Position	Player	Team
Outside Hitters	(United States) Claire Chaussee	LOVB Madison
Outside Hitters	(United States) Jordan Larson	LOVB Omaha
Middle Blockers	(United States) Anna Hall	LOVB Madison
Middle Blockers	(United States) Tia Jimerson	LOVB Atlanta
Setter	(United States) Rachel Fairbanks	LOVB Atlanta
Opposite Hitter	(United States) Jordan Thompson	LOVB Houston
Libero	(Japan) Manami Kojima	LOVB Salt Lake
