= Saige Ka'aha'aina-Torres =

American volleyball player (born 2000)

Personal information
- Nationality: United States
- Born: July 30, 2000 (age 26); Honolulu, Hawaii, U.S.
- Height: 1.83 m (6 ft 0 in)
- Education: Utah (2018–2021); Texas (2021–2022)

Volleyball information
- Position: Setter
- Current team: LOVB Atlanta
- Number: 9

Career
| Years | Teams |
|---|---|
| 2023 | Changas de Naranjito |
| 2023–2024 | Vandœuvre Nancy |
| 2025 | LOVB Austin |
| 2026 | Grand Rapids Rise |
| 2027 | LOVB Atlanta |

National team
| 2025– | United States |

Saige Hinaea Ka'aha'aina-Torres (born July 30, 2000) is an American professional volleyball player who plays for the Grand Rapids Rise of Major League Volleyball (MLV) and the United States national team.

== College career ==
After a standout high school career at ʻIolani School, Ka'aha'aina-Torres began her college career at Utah from 2018-2020 (with the latter season ending in 2021 due to the COVID-19 pandemic in the United States). In the fall of 2021, she transferred to Texas, where she won two Big 12 championships (2021 and 2022) and one NCAA national championship (2022).

== Club career ==
Ka'aha'aina-Torres began her professional career in Puerto Rico, where she played in the Liga de Voleibol Superior Femenino with Changas de Naranjito in 2023. She played in French Ligue A with Vandœuvre Nancy for the 2023-24 season.

In 2025, she returned to the United States to play in LOVB Pro with LOVB Austin, winning the inaugural LOVB championship. In 2026, she played for the Grand Rapids Rise of Major League Volleyball (MLV).

It was announced in 2026 that SKT would be going back to LOVB, and will wear the colours of the Atlanta team.

== International career ==
In 2025, Ka'aha'aina-Torres made her debut for the United States national team during the Volleyball Nations League.

== Personal life ==
Ka'aha'aina-Torres is of Hawaiian and Samoan descent. She is the daughter of former Arizona State football player Malo Torres and Jennifer Ka’aha’aina. She has two brothers, Elijah and Houston, who played football at Michigan and Nebraska.

== Honours ==
=== College ===
- 2022 NCAA Division I: Omaha regional All-Tournament Team

=== Clubs ===
- 2025 LOVB Pro - Champions, with LOVB Austin
