= Sangiacomo =

Sangiacomo is a surname. Notable people with the surname include:

- Angelo Sangiacomo (1924–2015), American real estate developer
- Arturo Olivieri Sangiacomo (1861–1903), Italian writer and journalist
- Julia Sangiacomo (born 2001), American volleyball player
