= Anna Haak =

Swedish volleyball player

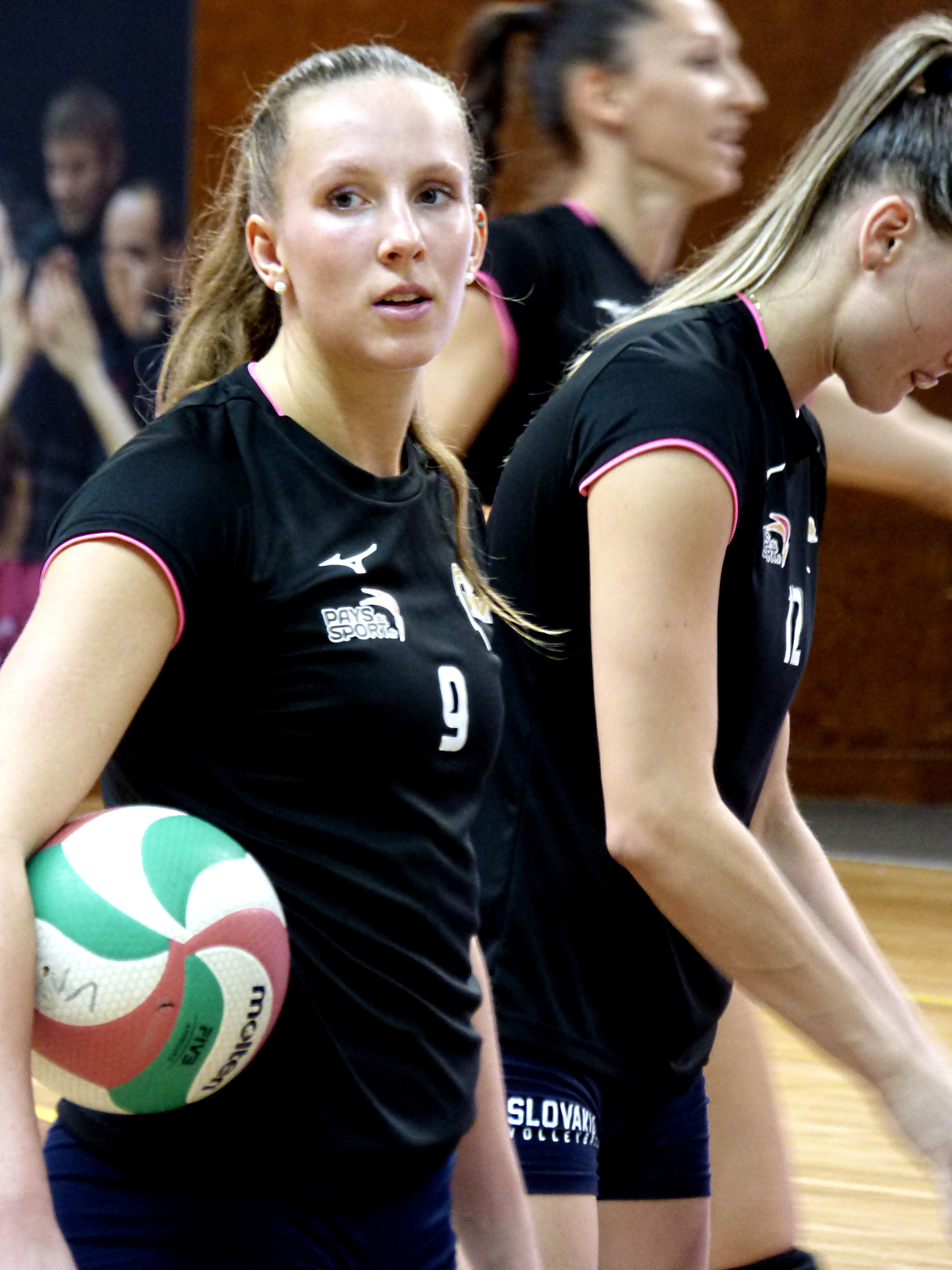

Personal information
- Nationality: Swedish
- Born: 12 September 1996 (age 30) Mulhouse, France
- Height: 1.79 m (5 ft 10 in)
- Spike: 320 cm (126 in)
- Block: 232 cm (91 in)

Volleyball information
- Position: Outside hitter
- Current club: (Japan) Victorina Himeji
- Number: 17

Career
- Years: Team
- 2012–2015: (Sweden) Engelholms VS
- 2015–2017: (United States) University of Miami
- 2017–2019: (United States) Marquette University
- 2019–2020: (France) Vandœuvre Nancy Volleyball
- 2020–2023: (France) ASPTT Mulhouse
- 2023–2024: (Italy) Cuneo Granda Volley
- 2024–2025: (United States) LOVB Austin
- 2025–2026: (United States) LOVB Madison
- 2026–: (Japan) Victorina Himeji

National team
- Years: Team
- 2014–: Sweden

Anna Haak (born 12 September 1996) is a Swedish volleyball player, who plays as an outside hitter for the Japanese club Victorina Himeji and the Swedish national team.

== Club career ==
Anna Haak was a part of her hometown's local volleyball team, Engelhoms VS, for at least three years, from 2012 to 2015. In the 2014–2015 season, Engelhoms VS won 1st Place.

While playing for the University of Miami, she tallied 3.21 kills per set and 2.36 digs per game.

== International career ==
In 2014, Haak helped Sweden to a gold medal at the NEVZA U19 tournament and earned a spot on the all-tournament team. With the Haak, Sweden won Gold at the 2018 Women's Silver European Volleyball League. In 2021, Sweden reached the Quarter-finals at the European Championship.

== Personal life ==
Haak was born in Mulhouse to a French father and a Swedish mother, but she later moved to Ängelholm shortly after her father had died from stomach cancer when she was 12 years old. Her younger sister Isabelle is also a national volleyball player and was her teammate during her time in Engelholms VS.

== Awards ==
=== Individuals ===
- 2015 Angelholms Gymnasieskola Idrottskolden "Sports Performance of the Year"

=== Clubs ===
- 2014–15 Elitserien – Champion, with Engelholms VS
- 2020–21 French Cup – Champion, with ASPTT Mulhouse
- 2020–21 French Championship – Champion, with ASPTT Mulhouse
- 2021 French Super Cup – Champion, with ASPTT Mulhouse
- 2021–22 French Championship – Runner-Up, with ASPTT Mulhouse
- 2022 French Super Cup – Champion, with ASPTT Mulhouse
- 2022–23 French Championship – Runner-Up, with ASPTT Mulhouse
- 2025 LOVB Pro – Champion, with LOVB Austin

=== National team ===
==== Junior team ====
- 2014 U19 NEVZA Championship – Gold Medal

==== Senior team ====
- 2018 European Silver League – Gold Medal
- 2022 European Silver League – Gold Medal
- 2023 European Golden League – Silver Medal
- 2024 European Golden League – Gold Medal
- 2026 European League – Gold Medal
