= Logan Eggleston =

American volleyball player (born 2000)

Personal information
- Born: November 13, 2000 (age 25)
- Height: 6 ft 2 in (188 cm)
- Education: Texas (2018–2023)

Volleyball information
- Position: Outside hitter
- Current club: LOVB Austin
- Number: 33

Career
Years	Teams
2023–2024	Galatasaray
2025–2026	LOVB Austin
2026-	Chieri '76

National team
2023–	United States
Medal record
Indoor Volleyball
Representing the United States
Pan-American Cup
Bronze medal – third place	2023 Ponce
Pan American Cup Final Six
Gold medal – first place	2023 Santo Domingo

Logan Eggleston (born November 13, 2000) is an American professional volleyball player for LOVB Austin. She played college volleyball for the Texas Longhorns, winning the NCAA championship and being named AVCA National Player of the Year in 2022.

== Early life ==
Eggleston was born on November 13, 2000, in Brentwood, Tennessee, to a white mother and black father. She played basketball in her youth but took up volleyball at age 13. She was selected to the United States junior national team at 16 and was named the team's Most Valuable Player and Best Server in 2018. She won three straight state championships at Brentwood High School before graduating a year early to attend the University of Texas at Austin.

== College career ==
Eggleton played at the University of Texas from 2018 to 2022. She was named Big 12 Conference Freshman of the Year in 2018. She became captain of the Longhorns as a sophomore. She became the president of the school's Student-Athlete Advisory Committee in 2020, taking part in campus activism to rename landmarks and build statues of former black students, and sitting on a committee to review the minstrelsy-related school song "The Eyes of Texas", during the George Floyd protests that summer. She took Texas to the 2020 NCAA tournament finals and was named Big 12 Player of the Year for the first of three times (2020, 2021, 2022).

In her fifth year of eligibility, Eggleston led Texas to win the 2022 NCAA championship alongside fellow first-team All-Americans Asjia O'Neal and Zoe Fleck. Eggleston was named the tournament's Most Outstanding Player and the national AVCA Player of the Year. She won five straight Big 12 championships at Texas and set the Big 12 career ace record with 208 aces.

== Professional career ==
Eggleston signed a 1 1/2-year contract with the Turkish volleyball club Galatasaray S.K., based in Istanbul, during the 2022–23 season.

In December 2024, Eggleston joined LOVB Austin ahead of LOVB Pro's inaugural season. Austin was fifth of six teams in the 2025 regular season, going 5–11. However, in the inaugural LOVB finals, the team clicked and completed two reverse sweeps, against Salt Lake and No. 1 Atlanta, before winning the championship game in three sets over Omaha. Eggleston and Madi Skinner led the team with 17 kills each in the title game. Eggleston stayed with Austin for another season where they won back to back league championships.

Italian club Chieri '76 announced Eggleston will be joining them for the 2026/2027 season.

== Awards and honors ==
- 2023 NCAA Woman of the Year Award
