= Eva Hudson =

American volleyball player

Eva Hudson (born May 18, 2004) is an American volleyball player who plays as an outside hitter for LOVB Atlanta. She played her collegiate career at Purdue University (2022–2024) and the University of Kentucky (2025), helping lead the latter to the NCAA Division I championship match.

During her lone season at Kentucky, Hudson was named the 2025 Southeastern Conference (SEC) Player of the Year and was a finalist for AVCA National Player of the Year. While at Purdue, Hudson became the fastest player in program history to reach 1,000 career kills during the rally-scoring era, reaching the milestone during the 2023 season.

Internationally, Hudson has represented the United States at multiple levels. She earned a silver medal with the U.S. women's national team at the 2024 NORCECA Pan Am Cup Final Six and won gold medals with U.S. age-group national teams at the U23 level in 2025 and the U21 level in 2023.
