= Jordan Thompson (volleyball) =

American volleyball player (born 1997)

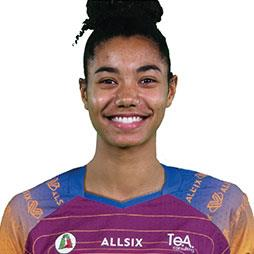
- Thompson in 2022

Personal information
- Full name: Jordan Mackenzie Thompson
- Nationality: American
- Born: May 5, 1997 (age 29) Edina, Minnesota, U.S.
- Education: University of Cincinnati
- Height: 1.93 m (6 ft 4 in)
- Weight: 70 kg (154 lb)
- Spike: 320 cm (126 in)
- Block: 314 cm (124 in)

Volleyball information
- Position: Opposite hitter
- Current club: LOVB Houston
- Number: 12 (national team) 23 (LOVB Houston)

Career
- Years: Team
- 2019–2020: Fenerbahçe
- 2020–2021: Eczacıbaşı VitrA
- 2022–2023: Vero Volley Milano
- 2023–2024: VakıfBank S.K.
- 2024–: LOVB Houston

National team
- Years: Team
- 2019–: United States
Medal record
Women's volleyball
Representing the United States
Olympic Games
| Gold medal – first place | 2020 Tokyo | Team |
| Silver medal – second place | 2024 Paris | Team |
FIVB Nations League
| Gold medal – first place | 2019 Nanjing | Team |
| Gold medal – first place | 2021 Rimini | Team |

Jordan Mackenzie Thompson (born May 5, 1997) is an American volleyball player for the United States women's national volleyball team and LOVB Houston.

Thompson played collegiate volleyball with the University of Cincinnati Bearcats from 2015 to 2019, becoming the team's all-time career kills leader as well as the seventh all-time NCAA leader in career kills.

With Team USA, Thompson has placed first in several international competitions, including the program's first-ever gold medal at the 2020 Summer Olympics and a silver medal at the 2024 Summer Olympics.

== Early life ==
Thompson was born in Edina, Minnesota, to parents Tyrone Doleman and Mary Thompson. Her father also had an athletic career, as he played basketball at the University of Pittsburgh at Johnstown, with the Harlem Globetrotters and eight years professionally overseas. Her uncle was Pro Football Hall of Famer Chris Doleman.

Thompson initially played basketball in middle school, but became frustrated with it and decided to try volleyball. After just two years of club volleyball, she got her first NCAA Division I scholarship offer.

She attended Edina High School where she was a four-year letterwinner, won two conference championships (2011, 2012) and led the team in blocks and kills during her senior season. She first played club volleyball at Club 43, but then transferred to Northern Lights, leading them to an AAU 17 Open title.

== Career ==
=== Cincinnati ===
Thompson played college volleyball for Cincinnati, where she was the a three time unanimous American Athletic Conference Player of the Year and a two-time AVCA All-American, garnering first-team honors as well as North Region Player of the Year in her redshirt senior season in 2019. In a win over Connecticut on Nov. 3, 2019, she had 50 kills in the match which is the most kills ever in an NCAA Division I match since the rally-scoring era began.

Thompson's suffered a UCL injury in her elbow during practice at Cincinnati before her junior season. She successfully underwent Tommy John surgery and recovered from her injury, returning to play after taking a redshirt season in 2017.

In her final season, she led Cincinnati to the 2019 NCAA Division I women's volleyball tournament Sweet Sixteen round, where they lost in a close five set match to Penn State. It was the first time any school from the American Athletic Conference made it into the Sweet Sixteen round of the NCAA tournament. She finished her collegiate career ranked seventh all-time in career kills in NCAA history and led the nation in kills, points, kills per set and points per set. She is the all-time leader in career kills at Cincinnati.

=== Professional clubs ===
Thompson signed her first professional volleyball contract in 2019 began when she played for Turkish club Fenerbahçe. She then signed with Eczacıbaşı VitrA, another club from Turkey, for the 2020–2021 season. She was named best outside hitter in the 2020 Turkish Super Cup, helping Eczacıbaşı VitrA to the Turkish League Title. Although she was to play another season with Eczacıbaşı VitrA in 2021–2022, she parted ways with the team by mutual agreement in the early stages of the season. Thompson returned to the United States to continue treatment for the ankle injury she sustained during the 2020 Olympics.

In June 2022, Italian Serie A1 team Vero Volley Milano announced that Thompson would join the team for the 2022–2023 season.

During the 2023 northern hemisphere summer, Thompson was signed to VakıfBankSporKulübü / VakıfBank Istanbul.

Thompson became a founding athlete for League One Volleyball's Houston team and played in the league's inaugural season in 2025. As LOVB Houston's leading points scorer, she was named Opposite Hitter of the Year and named to the All-League Second Team.

=== USA National Team ===
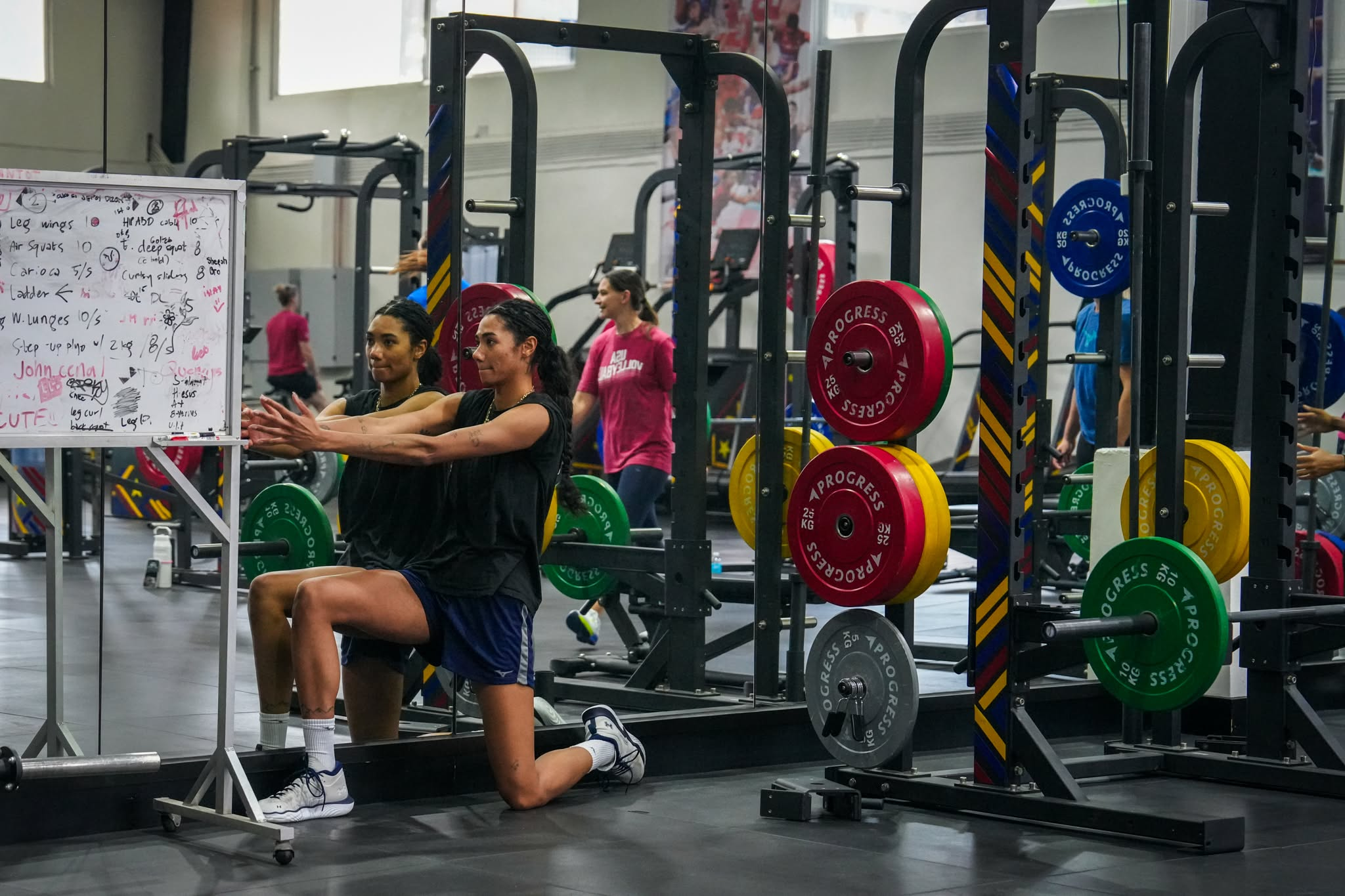
Thompson (left) training in Manila ahead of the 2026 FIVB Women's Volleyball Nations League

Thompson's first major tournament play with the USA National Team came in 2019 during the 2020 Summer Olympics qualifier tournament, where she helped Team USA qualify for the Olympics. She was one of just three players on Team USA's qualifying roster with collegiate eligibility, and was the only one of the three to see playing time.

She was chosen to represent USA at the 2019 FIVB Volleyball Women's Nations League, where she scored 33 points versus Brazil in the Finals Round pool play. USA would eventually win the gold medal. After a one-year delay due to the 2020 Nations League being cancelled due to the COVID-19 pandemic, she was selected to again represent USA at the 2021 FIVB Volleyball Women's Nations League in May 2021. She had a match high 17 points in USA's sweep of Thailand. USA won the gold medal for the third year in a row after defeating Brazil, 3 sets to 1.

On June 7, 2021, she was named to the 12-player Olympic roster for the 2020 Summer Olympics in Tokyo. In a pool play match against China, Thompson led all players with 34 total points, helping team USA win 3–0 against the defending Olympic champions. After suffering an ankle injury in a pool match against Russia, she did not make an appearance for the remainder of the tournament. Despite Thompson's absence, USA would eventually win the gold medal, the first in program history, after defeating Brazil in straight sets.

In June 2022, Thompson returned to national team competition after recovering from her ankle injury sustained during the 2020 Olympic Games, when she played in the 2022 FIVB Volleyball Women's Nations League tournament. She had 15 points in a win vs. the Dominican Republic.

Thompson was expected to compete in the 2022 FIVB Volleyball Women's World Championship, but did not make the final roster at the last minute due to injury. In 2024, she was again selected as part of the Olympic roster for the 2024 Summer Olympics in Paris, where she won a silver medal with the team.

== Personal life ==
Thompson has said she is a Christian. In 2018, she married Blake Yager. In 2026, Thompson became engaged to Canadian basketball player Dyshawn Pierre. The same year, she spoke out against ICE's actions in her home state of Minnesota. While visiting her home state, Thompson attended a protest and had a flashbang thrown near her.

== Individual awards ==
=== College ===
- 2015 American Athletic Conference Freshman of the Year
- 2015 Unanimous First Team All-American Athletic Conference
- 2016 AVCA Honorable Mention All-America
- 2016 AVCA All–Region
- 2016 First Team All-American Athletic Conference
- 2016 Unanimous American Athletic Conference Player of the Year
- 2018 AVCA Third Team All-America
- 2018 AVCA All–Region
- 2018 Unanimous American Athletic Conference Player of the Year
- 2019 CoSida Third Team Academic All-American
- 2019 Unanimous American Athletic Conference Player of the Year
- 2019 AVCA All–Region
- 2019 AVCA First Team All-America
- 2019 AVCA North Region Player of the Year

=== Professional ===
- 2020 Turkish Super Cup – Best outside hitter
- 2025 League One Volleyball – Opposite hitter of the year
- 2025 League One Volleyball – Icons second team
- 2025 Athletes Unlimited Volleyball Champion
- 2026 League One Volleyball – Most Valuable Player
- 2026 League One Volleyball – Opposite hitter of the year
- 2026 League One Volleyball – Icons first team
