= Juliann Faucette =

American volleyball player (born 1989)

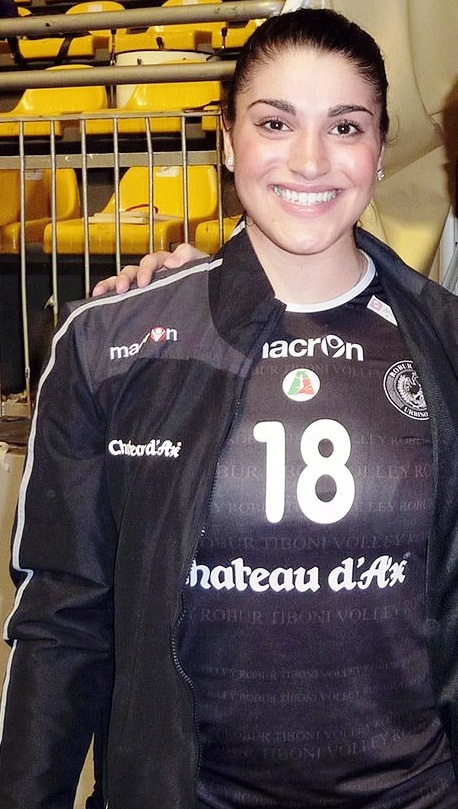

Personal information
- Nationality: American
- Born: November 25, 1989 (age 36); San Diego, California, U.S.
- Height: 1.90 m (6 ft 3 in)
- Education: Texas Longhorns

Volleyball information
- Position: Opposite spiker
- Current team: LOVB Austin
- Number: 13

Career
| Years | Teams |
|---|---|
| 2011–2012 | Robur Tiboni Urbino |
| 2012–2013 | UYBA Volley |
| 2013–2014 | Guangdong Evergrande |
| 2014–2015 | RC Cannes |
| 2015–2016 | Fujian |
| 2016–2017 | Guangdong |
| 2017–2018 | Kurobe AquaFairies |
| 2020–2021 | Bergamo |
| 2025– | LOVB Austin |

National team
| 2008–2014 | United States |

Juliann Faucette (born November 25, 1989) is an American professional volleyball player who plays as an opposite spiker for the LOVB Pro team LOVB Austin. She also represented the United States national team.

== Youth and college career ==
Faucette's volleyball career began in 2004 when she joined the San Diego Coast team. From 2007 to 2010, she played for the Texas Longhorns.

== Club career ==
In the 2011–12 season, Faucette was signed by the Italian team Robur Tiboni Urbino, in Serie A1, while in the following season she moved to Busto Arsizio with whom she won the Supercoppa Italiana.

In the 2013–14 season, Faucette moved to Guangdong Hengda, in the Chinese Volleyball League A, but returned to Europe the following season, when she played in the French Ligue A for RC Cannes, with whom she won the championship. In the 2015–16 championship, she returned to China, this time defending the colors of Fujian; however, in the following championship she changed jersey again, arriving at Guangdong, engaged in the qualifying tournament for the Volleyball League A.

In the 2017–18 season Faucette played in the Japanese V.Challenge League with the Kurobe AquaFairies; she announced her retirement at the end of the season.

Faucette came out of retirement in the 2020–21 season when it was announced she was signed by Bergamo, thanks to which she returned to the fields of the top Italian league. After another period of inactivity, she returned to competition in her homeland, where he took part in the first season of the LOVB Pro with LOVB Austin, winning the national title.

== International career ==
In 2008, Faucette received her first call-ups to the United States national team, with whom she participated in the 2008 Pan American Cup. In 2014, with the US national team, she won the silver medal at the Pan American Cup.

== Personal life ==
Faucette is the daughter of Chuck Faucette, a former football linebacker. She is a single mother of three children.

== Honours ==
=== College ===
- 2007 National Freshman of the Year
- 2007 All-America First Team
- 2009 All-America Third Team
- 2009 NCAA Division I: Omaha regional All-Tournament Team
- 2009 NCAA Division I: Tampa national All-Tournament Team
- 2010 All-America First Team
- 2010 NCAA Division I: Austin regional MVP
- 2010 NCAA Division I: Kansas City national All-Tournament Team

=== Clubs ===
- 2012 Supercoppa Italiana – Champion, with UYBA Volley
- 2014–15 French Championship – Champion, with RC Cannes
- 2025 LOVB Pro - Champions, with LOVB Austin

=== National team ===
- 2014 Montreux Volley Masters
- 2014 Women's Pan-American Volleyball Cup
