= Amber Igiede =

American volleyball player (born 2001)

Personal information
- Nationality: American
- Born: January 8, 2001 (age 25); Baton Rouge, Louisiana, U.S.
- Height: 6 ft 3 in (1.91 m)
- Education: University of Hawaiʻi at Mānoa

Volleyball information
- Position: Middle blocker
- Current club: (United States) LOVB Houston
- Number: 3 (LOVB Houston)

National team
| United States |
Medal record
Pan-American Cup
| Silver medal – second place | 2024 León and Irapuato |

Amber Igiede (born January 8, 2001) is an American volleyball player who plays as a middle blocker for LOVB Houston.

== Club career ==
Igiede's career began in the Louisiana high school tournaments, playing for St. Michael. She then joined the NCAA Division I tournament, where she played from 2019 to 2023 with Hawaii, receiving some individual recognition.

In March 2024, Igiede signed her first professional contract in Italy, when thanks to the signing of Roma Volley Club, she took part in the final phase of the 2023–24 Serie A1. She subsequently returned to the field in her homeland, playing in the LOVB Pro 2025 with LOVB Houston, with which she won the LOVB Classic, being awarded as best middle blocker, as well as being included in the first team of the LOVB Icons.

In the 2025–26 season, Igiede returned to the top Italian division, this time to join AGIL for a few months, before returning to LOVB Houston for the 2026 season.

== International career ==
In 2024, Igiede made her national team debut at the Pan American Cup, where she won the silver medal. She was also part of the US roster in the 2025 FIVB Women's Volleyball Nations League.

== Awards ==
=== Club ===
- 2025 LOVB Classic – Champions, with LOVB Houston

=== Individual ===
- 2022 – All-America Third Team
- 2023 – All-America Third Team
- 2025 – LOVB Classic: Best Middle Blocker
- 2025 – League One Volleyball: LOVB Icons First Team
