= Alessia Gennari =

Italian volleyball player

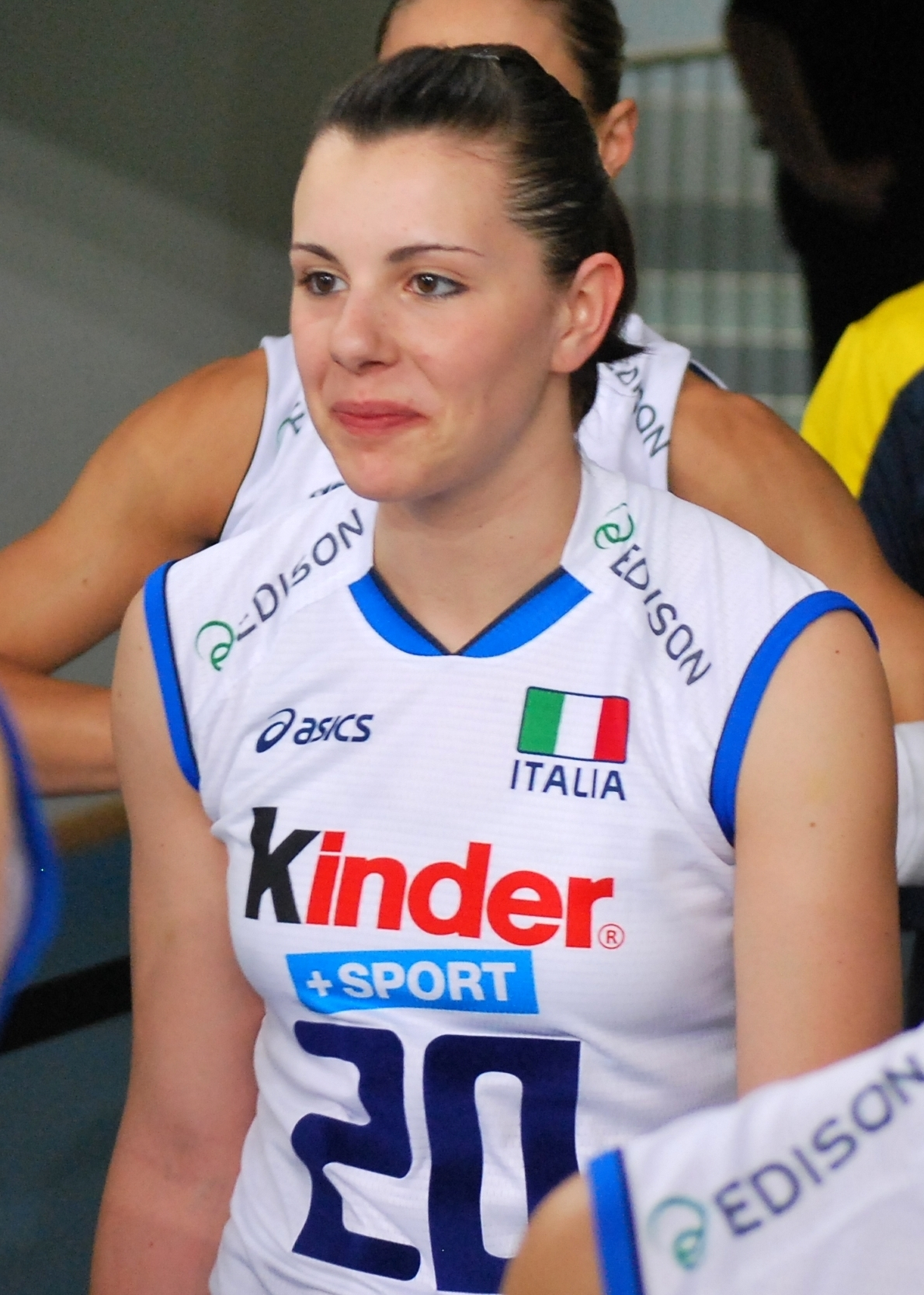
- Gennari in 2012

Personal information
- Nationality: Italian
- Born: 3 November 1991 (age 34); Parma, Italy
- Height: 1.84 m (6 ft 0 in)
- Weight: 68 kg (150 lb)
- Spike: 302 cm (119 in)
- Block: 284 cm (112 in)

Volleyball information
- Position: Outside hitter
- Current club: LOVB Austin
- Number: 6

Career
Years	Teams
2005–2009	Volley Sassuolo
2009–2011	Volley Cadelbosco
2011–2012	Riso Scotti Pavia
2012–2013	River Volley
2013	Chieri Torino Volley Club
2013–2015	VBC Casalmaggiore
2015–2017	Volley Bergamo
2017–2021	UYBA Volley
2021–2022	Vero Volley Monza
2022–2024	Imoco Volley
2024–present	LOVB Austin

National team
2011–	Italy
Honours
Women's volleyball
Representing Italy
FIVB World Championship
Bronze medal – third place	2022 Poland/Netherlands	Team
FIVB Nations League
Gold medal – first place	2022 Ankara	Team
European Championship
Gold medal – first place	2021 Serbia/Bulgaria/Croatia/Romania	Team
Mediterranean Games
Gold medal – first place	2013 Mersin	Team

Alessia Gennari (born 3 November 1991) is an Italian volleyball player, who plays as an outside hitter for the American club LOVB Austin and the Italian women's national volleyball team. At club level, she has won the Italian Championship, the Italian Cup, the CEV Cup and the FIVB Club World Championship with the clubs she played for. With the national team, she competed in the women's tournament at the 2016 Summer Olympics and has won the 2021 European Championship and the 2022 FIVB Volleyball Nations League.

== Awards ==
=== Individuals ===
- 2007 Junior European Championships "Best Hitter"

=== Clubs ===
- 2014–15 Italian League - Champion, with VBC Casalmaggiore
- 2015–16 Italian Cup - Champion, with Volley Bergamo
- 2016 Italian Super Cup – Runner-Up, with Volley Bergamo
- 2018–19 CEV Cup - Champion, with UYBA Volley
- 2019–20 Italian Cup – Runner-Up, with UYBA Volley
- 2020 Italian Super Cup – Runner-Up, with UYBA Volley
- 2021–22 Italian League – Runner-Up, with Vero Volley Monza
- 2022 Italian Super Cup – Champion, with Imoco Volley
- 2022 FIVB Club World Championship – Champion, with Imoco Volley
- 2022–23 Italian Cup – Champion, with Imoco Volley
- 2022–23 Italian League – Champion, with Imoco Volley
- 2023 Italian Super Cup – Champion, with Imoco Volley
- 2023–24 Italian Cup – Champion, with Imoco Volley
- 2023–24 Italian League – Champion, with Imoco Volley
- 2023–24 CEV Champions League – Champion, with Imoco Volley

=== National team ===
==== Junior team ====
- 2007 Junior European Championship – Bronze Medal

==== Senior team ====
- 2013 Mediterranean Games – Gold Medal
- 2021 European Championship – Gold Medal
- 2022 FIVB Volleyball Nations League – Gold Medal
- 2022 FIVB World Championship – Bronze Medal
