= Anna Hall (volleyball) =

American volleyball player (born 1999)

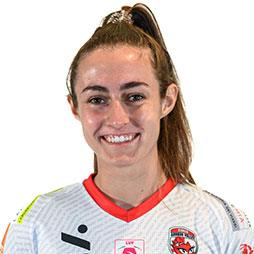
- Hall in 2022

Personal information
- Full name: Anna Elise Hall
- Nationality: United States
- Born: July 8, 1999 (age 27)
- Home town: Laurens, South Carolina
- Education: Louisville
- Height: 187 cm (6 ft 2 in)
- Weight: 73 kg (161 lb)

Volleyball information
- Position: Middle Blocker
- Current club: (United States) LOVB Madison
- Number: 2

Career
- Years: Team
- 2021–2022: (Turkey) Aydın Büyükşehir Belediyespor
- 2022–2024: (Italy) Cuneo Granda Volley
- 2024–: (United States) LOVB Madison

National team
- Years: Team
- 2022–: United States

Anna Elise Hall (née Stevenson; born July 8, 1999) is an American professional volleyball player who plays as a middle blocker for the United States women's national volleyball team and LOVB Pro professional team LOVB Madison.

== Early life ==
Hall grew up in Laurens, South Carolina and attended Laurens High School, where she played volleyball. She was the 82nd nationally ranked recruit in her graduating class, and was high school All-American. With her high school club team, she was a two-time national champion.

== Career ==
=== College ===
Hall played college volleyball for a total of five years, as she opted to use the extra year of eligibility granted by the NCAA due to the COVID-19 pandemic. After playing two seasons at Auburn, Hall transferred to Louisville, playing from 2019 to 2021. In her second season with Louisville in 2020, she earned AVCA Second Team All-American honors. In her final year in 2021, she was named a First Team All-American and helped Louisville finish as a semifinalist in the 2021 NCAA tournament. She was a member of the U.S. Collegiate National team as well in 2021.

=== Professional clubs ===
- (Turkey) Aydın Büyükşehir Belediyespor (2021–2022)
- (Italy) Cuneo Granda Volley (2022–2024)
- (United States) LOVB Madison (2024–)

=== USA National Team ===
In May 2022, Hall made her national team debut when she was named to the 25-player roster for the 2022 FIVB Volleyball Nations League tournament.

Hall was named to the roster for the FIVB World Championship. She saw limited playing time in the tournament, but notably had 12 points in a match against Germany, with 6 kills, 3 blocks, and 3 services aces. She also recorded 2 kills in a match against Serbia. The U.S. finished in fourth place.

== Personal life ==
In 2022, she married Duncan Hall. The two met while she was playing in Louisville.

In early 2025, Hall announced her pregnancy.

In September 2025, Hall announced the birth of her son.

== Awards and honors ==
=== Clubs ===
- 2021–2022 BVA Cup – Gold medal, with Aydın Büyükşehir Belediyespor.
- 2021–2022 CEV Challenge Cup Bronze medal, with Aydın Büyükşehir Belediyespor.

=== College ===
- AVCA First Team All-American (2021)
- AVCA Second Team All-American (2020)
