= LOVB Madison =

American volleyball team

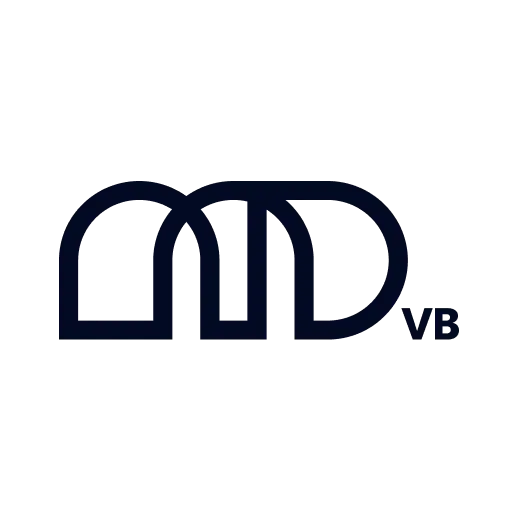
- Founded: 2023
- Ground: Alliant Energy Center; Madison, Wisconsin, U.S. Wisconsin Field House (2025); Madison, Wisconsin, U.S.
- Manager: Fernando Morales
- League: LOVB Pro
- 2026: DNQ; 6th in LOVB Pro
- Website: www.lovb.com/teams/lovb-madison-volleyball
- Championships: None

LOVB Madison is a United States professional women's indoor volleyball team based in Madison, Wisconsin. It is a member of LOVB Pro, which began play in January 2025. They are a member of the Eastern Conference. They are one of the six original teams of LOVB Pro.

== History ==
In 2021, LOVB announced plans to start a professional women's volleyball league in the United States. Madison was announced as LOVB's third team location in April 2023. Lauren Carlini, who played college volleyball for the Wisconsin Badgers in Madison, was the team's first player signed.

== Roster ==
As of April 21, 2026.

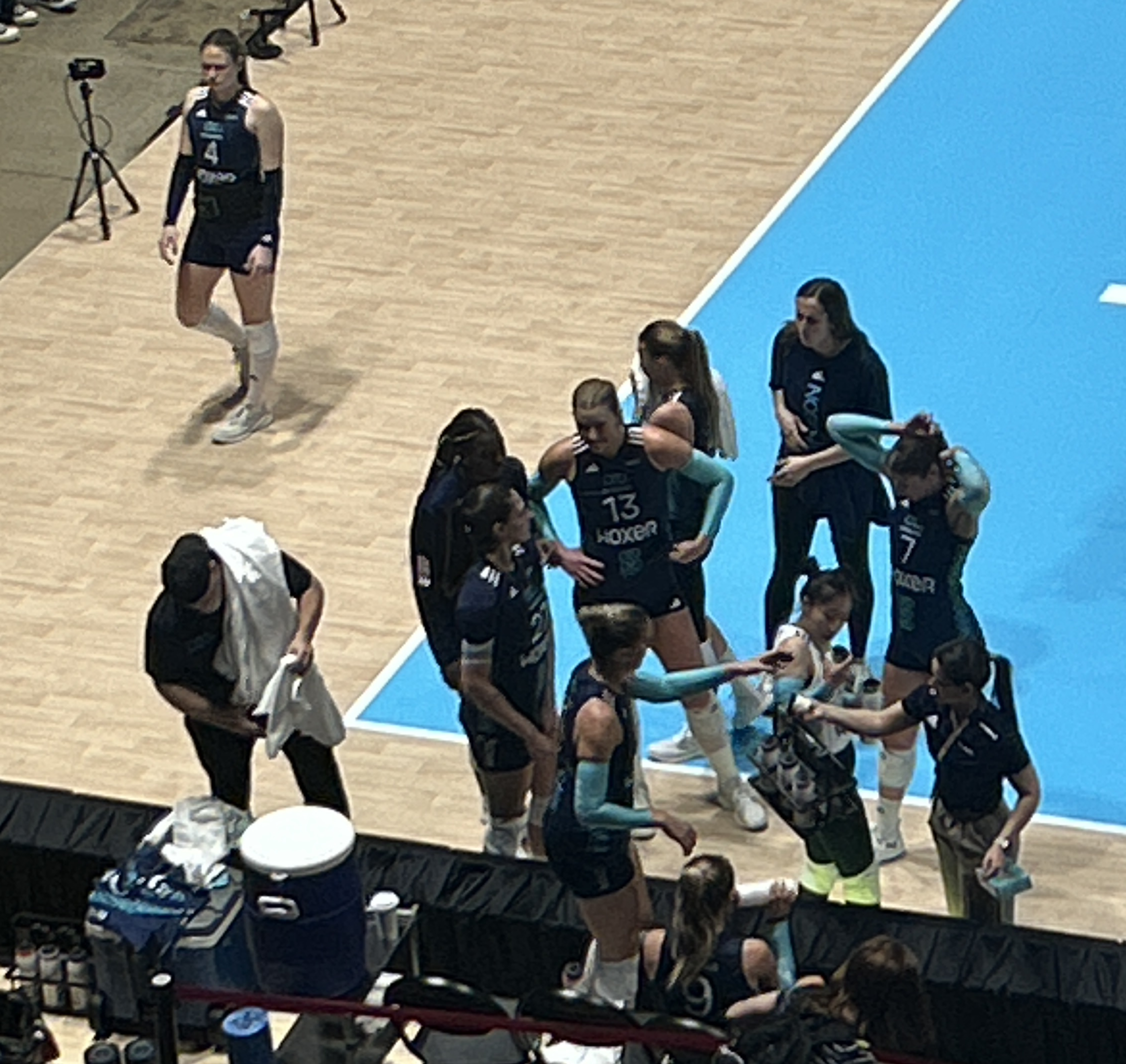
LOBV Madison players during a January 17, 2025 match at the Wisconsin Field House

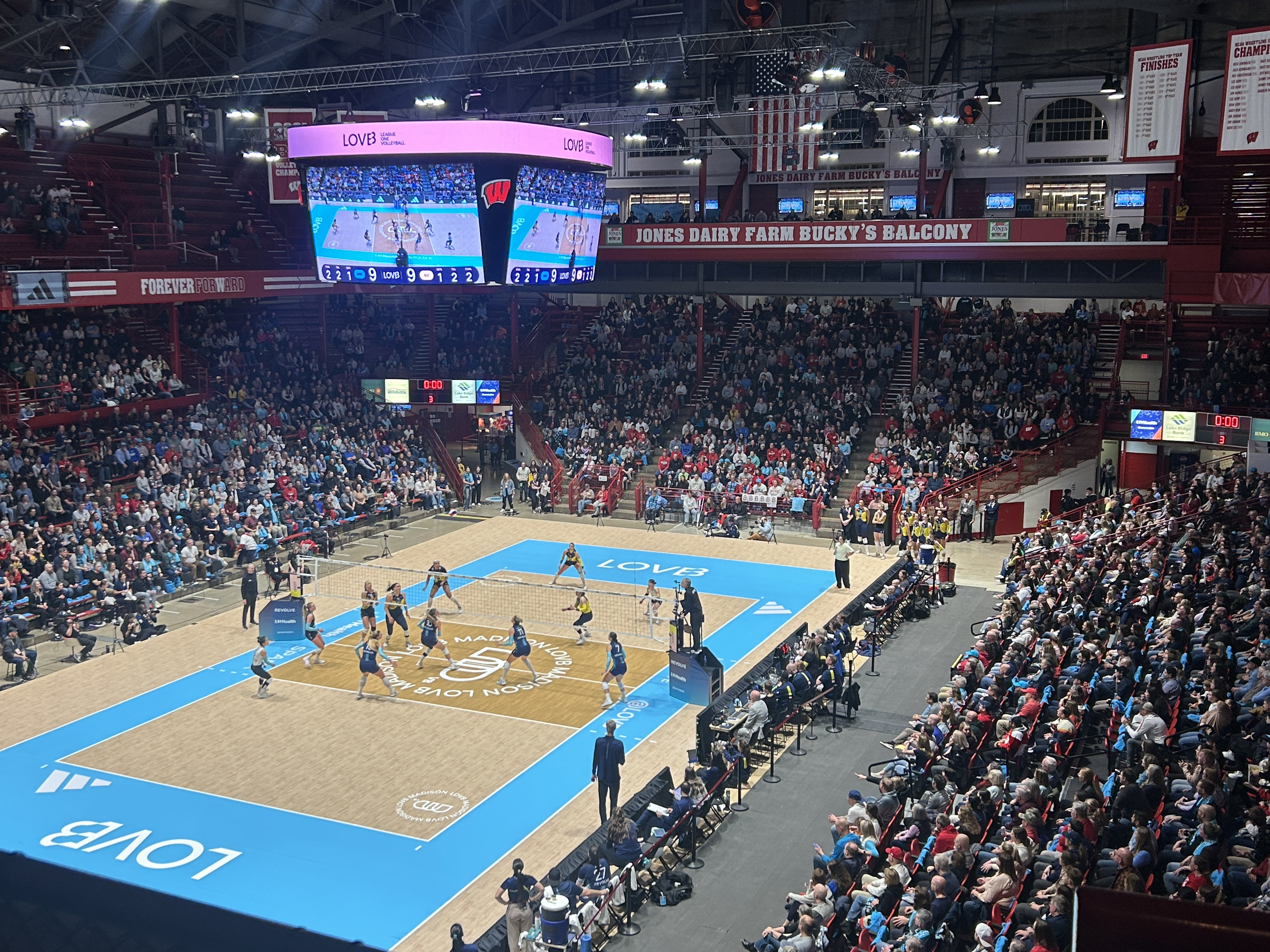
January 17, 2025 game at Wisconsin Field House

No.	Name	Position	Height	College / Home club	Nationality
1	Indrė Sorokaitė	Outside hitter	6 ft 0 in (1.83 m)		Italy
2	Anna Hall	Middle blocker	6 ft 2 in (1.88 m)	Louisville	United States
3	Mariena Hayden	Outside hitter	6 ft 0 in (1.83 m)	UNLV	United States
4	Milica Medved	Libero	5 ft 11 in (1.80 m)		Serbia
5	Rebekah Allick	Middle blocker	6 ft 4 in (1.93 m)	Nebraska	United States
6	Xiangyu Gong	Opposite hitter	6 ft 2 in (1.88 m)		China
7	Lauren Carlini	Setter	6 ft 1 in (1.85 m)	Wisconsin	United States
8	Argentina Ung	Setter	5 ft 11 in (1.80 m)	Arizona State / Washington State	Mexico
9	Claire Chaussee	Outside hitter	6 ft 0 in (1.83 m)	Louisville	United States
10	Annayka Legros	Middle blocker	6 ft 5 in (1.96 m)	Coastal Carolina	United States
11	Anna Pogany	Libero	5 ft 7 in (1.70 m)		Germany
12	Temi Thomas-Ailara	Opposite hitter	6 ft 2 in (1.88 m)	Wisconsin / Northwestern	United States
17	Anna Haak	Outside hitter	5 ft 10 in (1.78 m)	Marquette	Sweden
23	Gillian Grimes	Libero	5 ft 6 in (1.68 m)		United States
25	Callie Schwarzenbach	Middle blocker	6 ft 5 in (1.96 m)	Nebraska	United States
27	Ana Beatriz Corrêa	Middle blocker	6 ft 2 in (1.88 m)		Brazil

== Season standings ==
- 2025: 3rd (8–8), Quarterfinals (23 points)
- 2026: 6th (6–14), DNQ (22 points)
