= Khat Bell =

American volleyball player

Katherine Bell
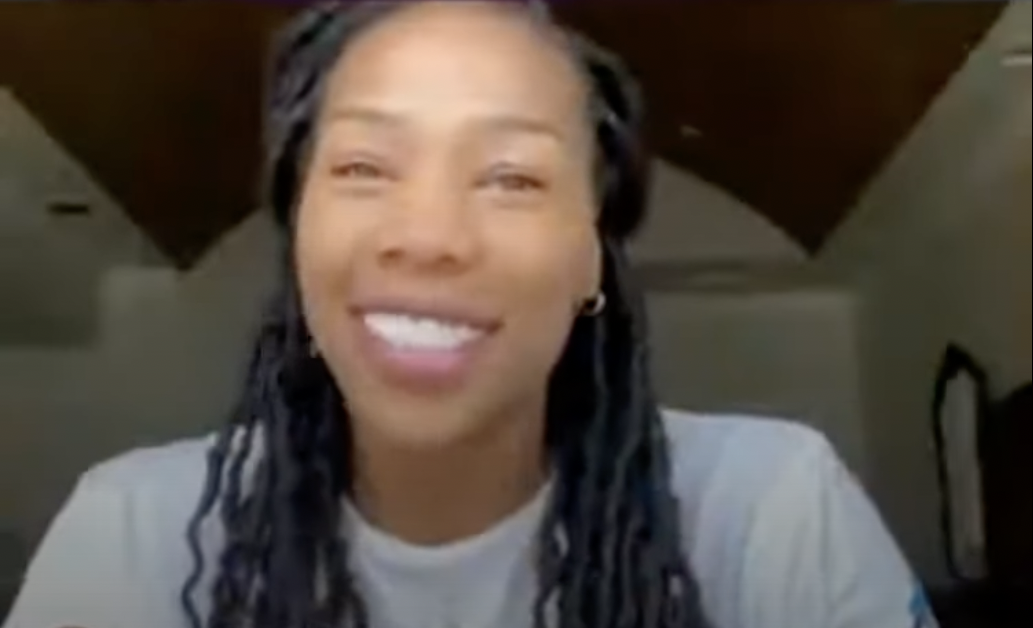
- Bell in 2019

Personal information
- Full name: Katherine Briana Bell
- Nickname: Khat
- Nationality: American
- Born: 5 March 1993 (age 33); San Diego, California, U.S
- Hometown: Mesquite, Texas, U.S.
- Height: 6 ft 2 in (1.88 m)
- Weight: 163 lb (74 kg)
- Education: University of Texas (2011–2014)

Volleyball information
- Position: Wing Spiker
- Current club: LOVB Austin
- Number: 1

Career
Years	Teams
2015–2016	GS Caltex Seoul KIXX
2016	Gigantes de Carolina
2016–2017	Manisa BB SK
2017–2018	Balıkesir Büyükşehir Belediyespor
2018–2020	Petron Blaze Spikers
2020–2021	Bolu BLD
2021–2022	Incheon Heungkuk Pink Spiders
2022	Galatasaray HDI Sigorta
2023	Korea Expressway Corporation Hi-Pass
2023-2024	Vegas Thrill
2024	Athletes Unlimited Pro Volleyball
2024	Chery Tiggo Crossovers
2024-	LOVB Austin

National team
2009	United States U18
2015	United States (Universiade)

Katherine Briana "Khat" Bell (born May 5, 1993) is an American volleyball player who currently plays for the LOVB Austin of LOVB Pro. Bell played for the Petron Blaze Spikers in the Philippine Super Liga from 2018 to 2020. and for Korea Expressway Corporation Hi-Pass in the Korean V-League in 2024.

== Early life ==
Bell was born on March 5, 1993, to Kenneth Bell and Regina Williams. She was born in San Diego, California, though she considers Mesquite, Texas, as her hometown. She has two sisters and a brother.

== Career ==
=== College ===
Bell during her attendance at the University of Texas played for the Texas Longhorns women's volleyball team in the NCAA. During her stint, she was named to the All-American women's volleyball team thrice. She, along with teammate Haley Eckerman, became the first senior class to win all four Big 12 championships for the Longhorns and advanced to three NCAA semifinals in four years. In 2012, they helped the Longhorns earn their first National Championship since 1988. Also, for the year 2012, she was named Cobra Magazine National Defensive Player of the Year. She finished fourth in the University of Texas' career chart with a record of 1.17 blocks per set. She graduated from the university in 2015.

=== Club ===
After graduating from the University of Texas, Bell started her club career in South Korea with GS Caltex Seoul. She played for the Korean club from 2015 to 2016 before playing for Gigantes de Carolina in Puerto Rico in 2016. Bell later played for Turkish clubs Manisa BB SK (2016–2017) and Balıkesir Büyükşehir Belediyespor (2017–2018). Two weeks before her stint with Balıkesir was set to end, Bell was contacted by the Petron Blaze Spikers of the Philippine Super Liga (PSL) due to its import player Hillary Hurley having recurring injuries. Bell replaced Hurley as Petron entered the semifinals of the 2018 PSL Grand Prix Conference. On May 1, 2018, Bell scored 42 points for Petron which is the PSL's 2nd highest record for points.

==== Galatasaray ====
She signed a 1-year contract with Galatasaray on September 22, 2022.

On 29 December 2022, she announced on her social media account that she had parted ways with Galatasaray.

=== Professional ===
Bell played for Athletes Unlimited Pro Volleyball during the 2024 Season.

=== International ===
Bell was part of the United States U18 girls' youth team that played at the 2009 FIVB Volleyball Girls' U18 World Championship in Thailand. She was also a participant of the 2015 Summer Universiade in South Korea, playing for the Universiade volleyball team of the United States.

== Television ==
Bell was a contestant on the second season of the American TV series The Circle.

== Sporting achievements ==
=== Individual ===
Korean V-League:

- Best Blocker

Philippine Superliga:

- Best Outside Spiker (2019 PSL Grand Prix Conference)

=== Team ===
Philippine Superliga:

- Champions - Petron Blaze Spikers (2018 PSL Grand Prix Conference, 2019 PSL Grand Prix Conference)
