= LOVB Houston =

American volleyball team

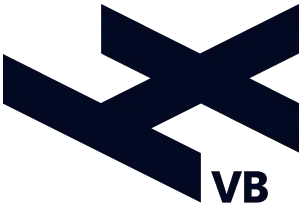
- Founded: 2023
- Ground: Fort Bend Epicenter; Rosenberg, Texas, U.S. Berry Center; Cypress, Texas, U.S.
- Manager: Sanja Tomašević
- League: LOVB Pro
- 2026: Semi-final; 1st in LOVB Pro
- Website: www.lovb.com/teams/lovb-houston-volleyball
- Championships: None

LOVB Houston is an American professional women's indoor volleyball team based in Houston, Texas. It is a member of LOVB Pro, which began play in January 2025.

== History ==
In 2021, LOVB announced plans to start a professional women's volleyball league in the United States. Houston was revealed as one of LOVB's first two team locations alongside Atlanta in March 2023. Micha Hancock and Jordan Thompson joined Houston as LOVB's first player signings.

== Roster ==
As of January 10, 2026.

No.	Name	Position	Height	College / Home club	Nationality
1	Grace Frohling	Opposite hitter	6 ft 5 in (1.96 m)	San Diego	United States
2	Karin Palgutová	Outside hitter	6 ft 2 in (1.88 m)	St. John's	Slovakia
3	Amber Igiede	Middle blocker	6 ft 3 in (1.91 m)	Hawaii	United States
4	Justine Wong-Orantes	Libero	5 ft 6 in (1.68 m)	Nebraska	United States
5	Lauren Briseño	Libero	5 ft 7 in (1.70 m)	Baylor	United States
6	Jazmine White	Middle blocker	6 ft 1 in (1.85 m)	Michigan State	Canada
7	Raphaela Folie	Middle blocker	6 ft 1 in (1.85 m)		Italy
8	Kaisa Alanko	Setter	5 ft 9 in (1.75 m)	University of Jyväskylä	Finland
9	Madi Rishel	Outside hitter	6 ft 0 in (1.83 m)	Arizona	United States
10	Maya Sands	Libero	5 ft 7 in (1.70 m)	Missouri	United States
11	Anita Anwusi	Middle blocker	6 ft 3 in (1.91 m)	LSU	United States
12	Micha Hancock	Setter	5 ft 11 in (1.80 m)	Penn State	United States
14	Julia Brown	Outside hitter	6 ft 1 in (1.85 m)	NC State	United States
16	Maddie Waak	Setter	5 ft 10 in (1.78 m)	Texas A&M	United States
17	Sara Loda	Outside hitter	5 ft 9 in (1.75 m)	Bergamo	Italy
18	Logan Lednicky	Opposite hitter	6 ft 3 in (1.91 m)	Texas A&M	United States
19	Jess Mruzik	Outside hitter	6 ft 1 in (1.85 m)	Penn State	United States
23	Jordan Thompson	Opposite hitter	6 ft 4 in (1.93 m)	Cincinnati	United States

== Season standings ==
- 2025: 2nd (10–6), Semifinals (27 points)
- 2026: 1st (13–7), Semifinals (39 points)
