= Julia Sangiacomo =

American volleyball player (born 2001)

Personal information
- Nationality: United States
- Born: 1 November 2001 (age 24)
- Hometown: Sonoma, California
- Height: 1.95 m (6 ft 5 in)

Volleyball information
- Position: Outside hitter
- Number: 2

Career
Years	Teams
2019–2023	(United States) Santa Clara University
2023–2024	(United States) Northwestern University
2024–2025	(Turkey) SigortaShop
2025	Gresik Petrokimia Pupuk Indonesia
2025	(Vietnam) Than Quảng Ninh VC (loan)
2025–present	(United States) LOVB Atlanta

Julia Sangiacomo (born November 1, 2001) is an American volleyball player who plays as an outside hitter. As of 2024–2025 season, she is playing for SigortaShop. She has played for Santa Clara University and Northwestern University before.

== Career ==
=== College ===
- (United States) Santa Clara University (2019–2023)
- (United States) Northwestern University (2023–2024)

=== Professional clubs ===
- (Turkey) SigortaShop (2024–2025)
- Gresik Petrokimia Pupuk Indonesia (2025)
- (Vietnam) Than Quảng Ninh VC (2025, loan)
- (United States) LOVB Atlanta (2025–present)
