= LOVB Salt Lake =

American volleyball team

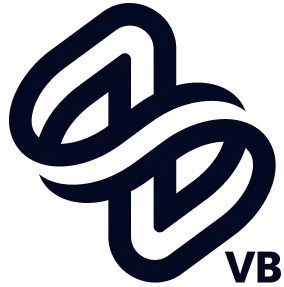
- Founded: 2023
- Ground: SLCC Bruin Arena; Taylorsville, Utah, U.S. Smith Fieldhouse; Provo, Utah, U.S. Maverik Center (2025); West Valley City, Utah, U.S.
- Manager: Tamari Miyashiro
- League: LOVB Pro
- 2026: Runners-Up; 4th in LOVB Pro
- Website: www.lovb.com/teams/lovb-salt-lake-volleyball
- Championships: None

LOVB Salt Lake is an American professional women's indoor volleyball team based in Salt Lake County, Utah. It is a member of LOVB Pro, which began play in January 2025.

== History ==
In 2021, LOVB announced plans to start a professional women's volleyball league in the United States. Salt Lake City was announced as LOVB's fourth team location in June 2023. Jordyn Poulter and Haleigh Washington were the team's founding athletes.

LOVB Salt Lake played its first home match on January 22, 2025 at Salt Lake Community College, drawing a sold-out crowd of 3,006 fans to the campus in Taylorsville.

== Roster ==
As of December 22, 2024.

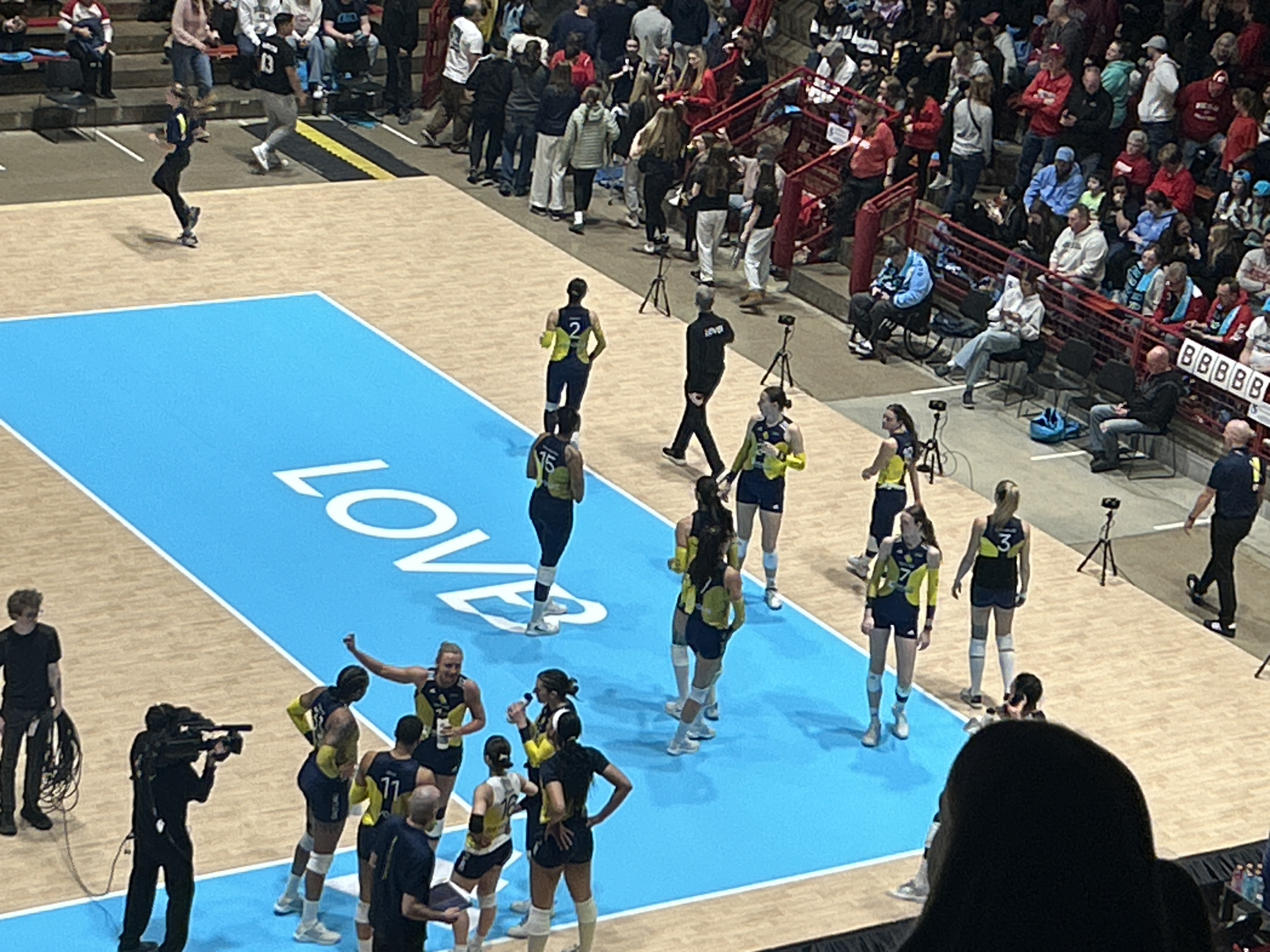
LOBV Salt Lake players during a January 17, 2025 match

| No. | Name | Position | Height | College / Home club | Nationality |
|---|---|---|---|---|---|
| 1 | Jordyn Poulter | Setter | 6 ft 2 in (1.88 m) | Illinois | United States |
| 2 | Tamaki Matsui | Setter | 5 ft 7 in (1.70 m) | JWCPE | Japan |
| 3 | Morgan Miller | Outside hitter | 6 ft 3 in (1.91 m) | California | United States |
| 4 | Maddie Haynes | Outside hitter | 6 ft 4 in (1.93 m) | California | United States |
| 5 | Skylar Fields | Opposite hitter | 6 ft 3 in (1.91 m) | USC | United States |
| 6 | Tori Dixon | Middle blocker | 6 ft 3 in (1.91 m) | Minnesota | United States |
| 7 | Sophie Fischer | Middle blocker | 6 ft 5 in (1.96 m) | Georgia | United States |
| 11 | Serena Gray | Middle blocker | 6 ft 2 in (1.88 m) | Pittsburgh | United States |
| 12 | Roni Jones-Perry | Outside hitter | 6 ft 0 in (1.83 m) | BYU | United States |
| 15 | Haleigh Washington | Middle blocker | 6 ft 3 in (1.91 m) | Penn State | United States |
| 16 | Manami Kojima | Libero | 5 ft 2 in (1.57 m) | Aoyama Gakuin | Japan |
| 17 | Dani Drews | Outside hitter | 6 ft 0 in (1.83 m) | Utah | United States |
| 18 | Mary Lake | Libero | 5 ft 7 in (1.70 m) | BYU | United States |
| 21 | Claire Hoffman | Outside hitter | 6 ft 2 in (1.88 m) | Washington | United States |
| 33 | Heidy Casanova | Opposite hitter | 6 ft 0 in (1.83 m) | | Cuba |

== Season standings ==
- 2025: 4th (7–9), Quarterfinals (22 points)
- 2026: 4th (10–10), Runners-Up (28 points)
