= McKenzie Adams =

American volleyball player

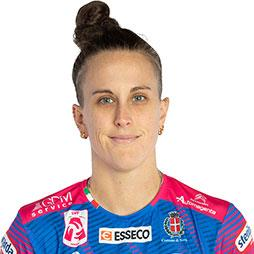
- Adams in 2022

Personal information
- Full name: McKenzie Elise Adams
- Nationality: American
- Born: February 13, 1992 (age 34)
- Hometown: Schertz, Texas
- Height: 192 cm (6 ft 4 in)
- Spike: 303 cm (119 in)
- Block: 285 cm (112 in)
- Education: Virginia/UTSA

Volleyball information
- Position: Outside hitter
- Current club: (United States) LOVB Atlanta
- Number: 13

Career
Years	Teams
2010	(United States) Virginia
2011–2013	(United States) UTSA
2014–2015	(Puerto Rico) Indias de Mayagüez
2016–2018	(Germany) Ladies in Black Aachen
2018–2020	(Germany) SSC Schwerin
2020–2021	(Italy) Imoco Volley Conegliano
2021–2022	(Turkey) Eczacıbaşı Dynavit
2022–2023	(Italy) Igor Gorgonzola Novara
2023-2024	(Japan) Hisamitsu Springs
2024	(Puerto Rico) Cangrejeros de Santurce
2024-present	(United States) LOVB Atlanta

McKenzie Elise Adams (born February 13, 1992) is an American professional volleyball player who plays as an outside hitter for LOVB Pro team LOVB Atlanta. She played collegiately at Virginia for one season before transferring and finishing her career out at UTSA, where she became the first ever All-American in the program's history.

== Personal life ==
Adams originates from Schertz, Texas and attended high school at Steele High School. She was a first-team all-state honoree and ranked as the national No. 24 recruit in her graduating class.

== Career ==
=== College ===
Adams played one season of college volleyball at Virginia. She earned accolades such as NCAA East Region, Atlantic Coast Conference and Virginia Sports Information Directors Freshman of the Year. She posted 265 kills and had over 100 digs on the season. She completed her final three seasons at the University of Texas, San Antonio. In her first season with UTSA, she was named the Southland Conference Newcomer of the Year and first-team All-Southland. During her junior season in 2012, she became the first All-American in program history after earning honorable mention All-America honor. She was also named to AVCA All-West Region, was the Western Athletic Conference Player of the Year and first-team All-WAC. She ranked second in the conference and 24th in the nation with 4.33 kills per set, and was fourth in the league with 3.84 assists per set. She finished the season as the 30th ranked national player in points per set (4.85).

=== Professional clubs ===
- (Puerto Rico) Indias de Mayagüez (2014–2015)
- (Germany) Ladies in Black Aachen (2016–2018)
- (Germany) SSC Schwerin (2018–2020)
- (Italy) Imoco Volley Conegliano (2020–2021)
- (Turkey) Eczacıbaşı Dynavit(2021–2022)
- (Italy) Igor Gorgonzola Novara (2022–2023)
- (Japan) Hisamitsu Springs (2023-2024)
- (Puerto Rico) Cangrejeros de Santurce (2024)
- (United States) LOVB Atlanta (2024-)

== Awards and honors ==
=== Clubs ===
- 2021-2022 CEV Cup – Champions, with Eczacıbaşı Dynavit
- 2021–2022 Turkish League – Bronze medal, with Eczacıbaşı Dynavit
- 2021–2022 Turkish Cup – Bronze medal, with Eczacıbaşı Dynavit
- 2021–2022 Turkish Super Cup – Silver, with Eczacıbaşı Dynavit
- 2020–2021 CEV Champions League – Champions, with Imoco Volley Conegliano
- 2020–2021 Italian Super Cup – Champions, with Imoco Volley Conegliano
- 2020–2021 Italian Cup – Champions, with Imoco Volley Conegliano
- 2019–2020 German Super Cup – Champions, with SSC Schwerin
- 2018–2019 German Super Cup – Champions, with SSC Schwerin
- 2018–2019 German Bundesliga – Silver medal, with SSC Schwerin
- 2014–2015 Puerto Rican League – Silver medal, with Indias de Mayagüez

=== Individual awards ===
==== Club ====
- 2019–2020 German Super Cup – Most valuable player

==== College ====
- AVCA All-American (Third Team, 2013))
- Western Athletic Conference Player of the Year (2012)
