= TeTori Dixon =

American volleyball player

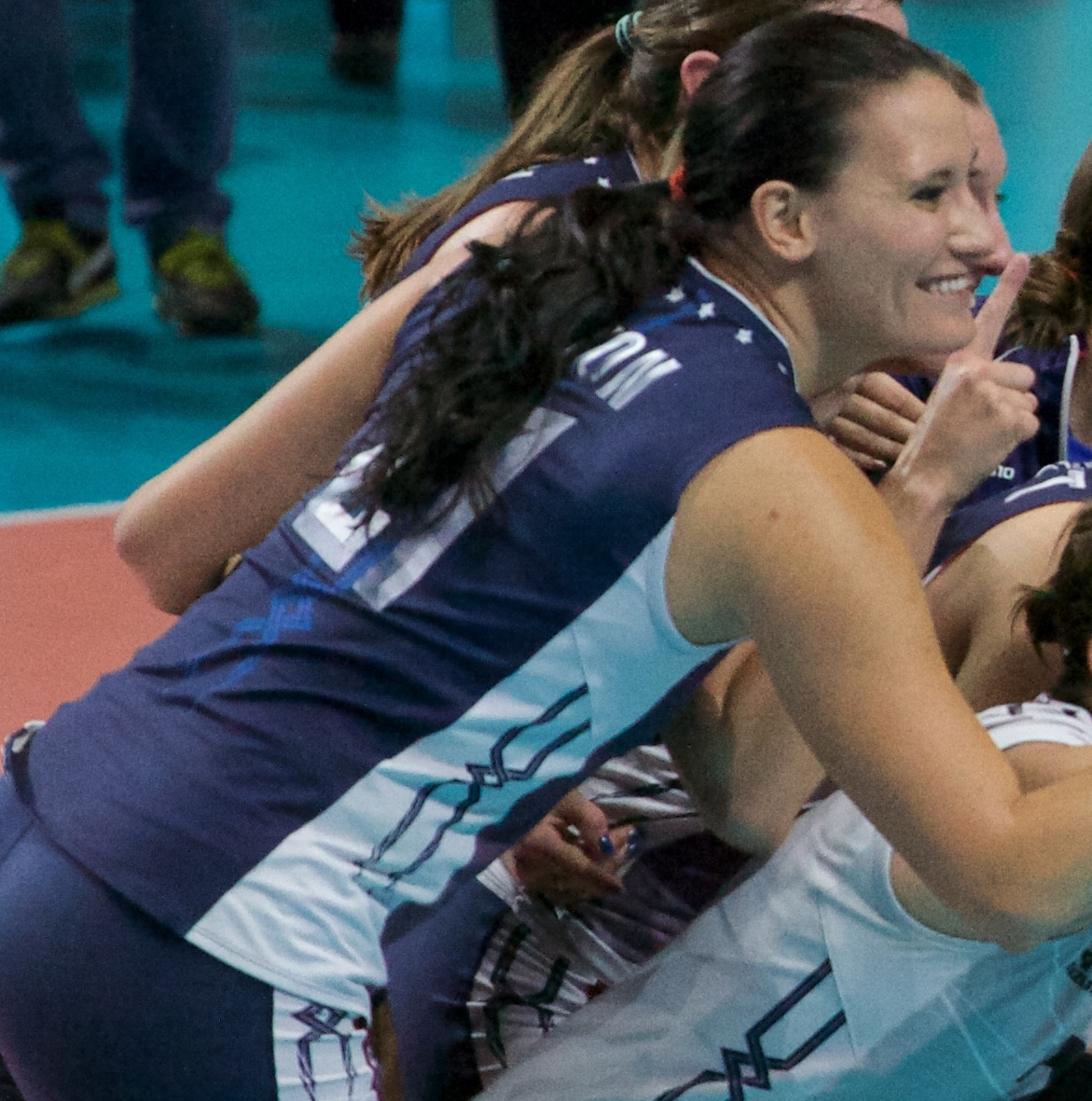

Personal information
- Full name: TeTori Elsie Dixon
- Born: August 4, 1992 (age 34); Arizona, U.S.
- Hometown: Burnsville, Minnesota, U.S.
- Height: 6 ft 3 in (1.90 m)
- Spike: 121 in (307 cm)
- Block: 116 in (295 cm)

Volleyball information
- Position: Middle Blocker
- Current club: (United States) LOVB Salt Lake
- Number: 6

Career
Years	Teams
2013–2015; 2015–2017; 2017–2018; 2018–? 2021–2022; 2023–2024; 2024; 2024–	(Azerbaijan) Rabita Baku (Japan) Toray Arrows (Italy) US Victoria Monza (China) Beijing BAIC Motors (Turkey) Türk Hava Yolları (United States) Omaha Supernovas] (United States) Athletes Unlimited Pro Volleyball (United States) LOVB Salt Lake

National team
2013–present	United States
Medal record
Women's volleyball
Representing the United States
World Championship
Gold medal – first place	2014 Italy	Team
World Cup
Silver medal – second place	2019 Japan	Team
Bronze medal – third place	2015 Japan	Team
NORCECA Championship
Silver medal – second place	2019 San Juan	Team
World Grand Champions Cup
Bronze medal – third place	2017 Japan	Team
FIVB Nations League
Gold medal – first place	2018 Nanjing	Team
Gold medal – first place	2019 Nanjing	Team

TeTori "Tori" Elsie Dixon (born August 4, 1992) is an American indoor volleyball player for the LOVB Salt Lake of the LOVB Pro. She is best known for being part of the United States national team that won the 2014 World Championship gold medal.

== Career ==
=== College ===
She played college volleyball for the University of Minnesota Golden Gophers women's volleyball team. Dixon was Selected AVCA All-America First-Team a unanimous All-Big Ten. She finished her career ranked fifth all time in total blocks (507), the best ever career hitting percentage (.369) and ninth all-time in career kills (1,479).

=== International ===
Dixon was part of the USA national team that won the 2014 World Championship gold medal when the team defeated China 3-1 in the final match. Dixon was named Best Middle Blocker at the 2014 Women's Pan-American Volleyball Cup.

Dixon played for Rabita Baku for the 2014/15 season, taking part of the Women's CEV Champions League and Azerbaijan Women's Volleyball Super League. She then played for the Japanese club Toray Arrows for the 2015/16 season. In 2019 she played for Beijing BAIC Motor China Volleyball League.

In May 2021, she was named to the 18-player roster for the FIVB Volleyball Nations League tournament. that will be played May 25 – June 24 in Rimini, Italy. It is the only major international competition before the Tokyo Olympics in July.

== Awards ==
=== Individual ===
- 2015 FIVB World Cup "Best Middle Blockers"
- 2018 Nations League "Best Middle Blockers"
- 2018–19 Chinese Volleyball League "Most Valuable Player"

== Personal ==
Dixon is the daughter of former National Football League player David Dixon. She is of Māori descent.

Awards
Preceded by -	Best Middle Blocker of FIVB Nations League; 2018 ex aequo (Turkey) Eda Erdem Dündar	Succeeded by (Brazil) Ana Beatriz Corrêa (United States) Haleigh Washington
