= Lauren Carlini =

American volleyball player (born 1995)

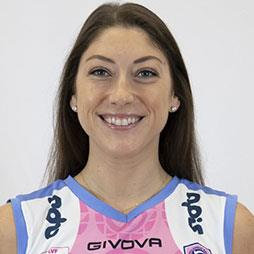
- Carlini in 2023

Personal information
- Full name: Lauren Nicole Carlini
- Nationality: United States
- Born: February 28, 1995 (age 31); Geneva, Illinois, U.S.
- Hometown: Aurora, Illinois, U.S.
- Height: 6 ft 1 in (1.85 m)
- Weight: 170 lb (77 kg)
- Spike: 119 in (302 cm)
- Block: 116 in (295 cm)
- Education: University of Wisconsin

Volleyball information
- Position: Setter
- Current club: (United States) LOVB Madison

Career
Years	Teams
2017–2018	(Italy) Savino Del Bene Scandicci
2018–2019	(Italy) Igor Gorgonzola Novara
2019–2020	(Russia) Dinamo Moscow
2020–2022	(Turkey) Türk Hava Yolları
2022–2023	(Italy) Casalmaggiore
2023–2024	(Turkey) Aydın Büyükşehir Belediyespor
2024–present	(United States) LOVB Madison

National team
2016–2024	United States
Medal record
Women's volleyball
Representing the United States
Olympic Games
Silver medal – second place	2024 Paris	Team
World Cup
Silver medal – second place	2019 Japan	Team
FIVB Nations League
Gold medal – first place	2019 Nanjing	Team
Pan-American Cup
Gold medal – first place	2017 Cañete/Lima
Gold medal – first place	2018 Santo Domingo
Bronze medal – third place	2016 Santo Domingo

Lauren Nicole Carlini (/kɑːrˈliːni/ kar-LEE-nee; born February 28, 1995) is an American volleyball player. She plays for the United States women's volleyball team. She won the 2016 Sullivan Award as America's best amateur athlete.

== Early life ==
Carlini attended West Aurora High School in Aurora, Illinois. In 2012, she was named the Gatorade National Volleyball Player of the Year.

== College ==
Carlini played for the University of Wisconsin from 2013 to 2016, where she was the first player in program history to be named a four-time All-American.

As a freshman, Carlini led Wisconsin to its first tournament appearance since 2005 and its first championship match since 2000, where the Badgers lost in four sets to Penn State. Carlini registered 39 assists in the match and was named to the All-Tournament Team. In 2014, Carlini was named the Big Ten Player of the Year.

For her accomplishments at Wisconsin, Carlini became the first-ever volleyball player and Wisconsin athlete to win the 2017 AAU James E. Sullivan Award. She was also named as one of four finalists for the Honda Sports Award in volleyball for both the 2014–15 season and the 2015–16 season.

== International career ==
=== Club ===
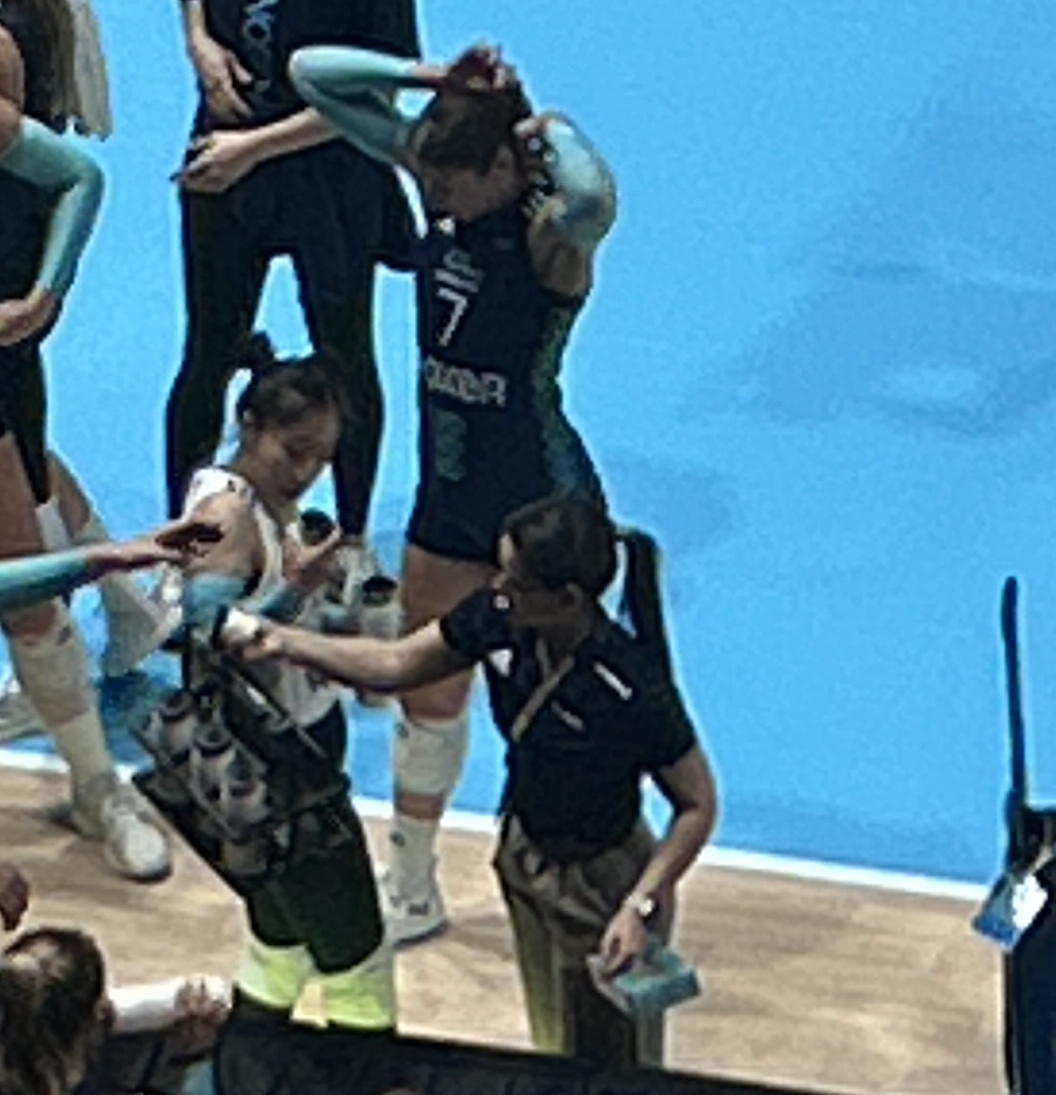
Carlini playing with LOVB Madison in January 2025

On a club level, she played professionally in Italy, Russia and Turkey. In 2025, Carlini competed for LOVB Madison in the league's inaugural season.

=== National team ===
In May 2021, she was named to the 18-player roster for the FIVB Volleyball Nations League tournament. that was played May 25 – June 24 in Rimini, Italy. It was the only major international competition before the Tokyo Olympics.

She was selected as an Olympic alternate for the 2020 Summer Olympics. She was named to the Olympic team for the 2024 Summer Olympics. Following the 2024 games, Carlini announced her retirement from the national team.

== Coaching ==
In September 2024, Carlini was hired by the University of Wisconsin team as an offensive analyst and strategy consultant.
