= Kotoe Inoue =

Japanese volleyball player (born 1990)

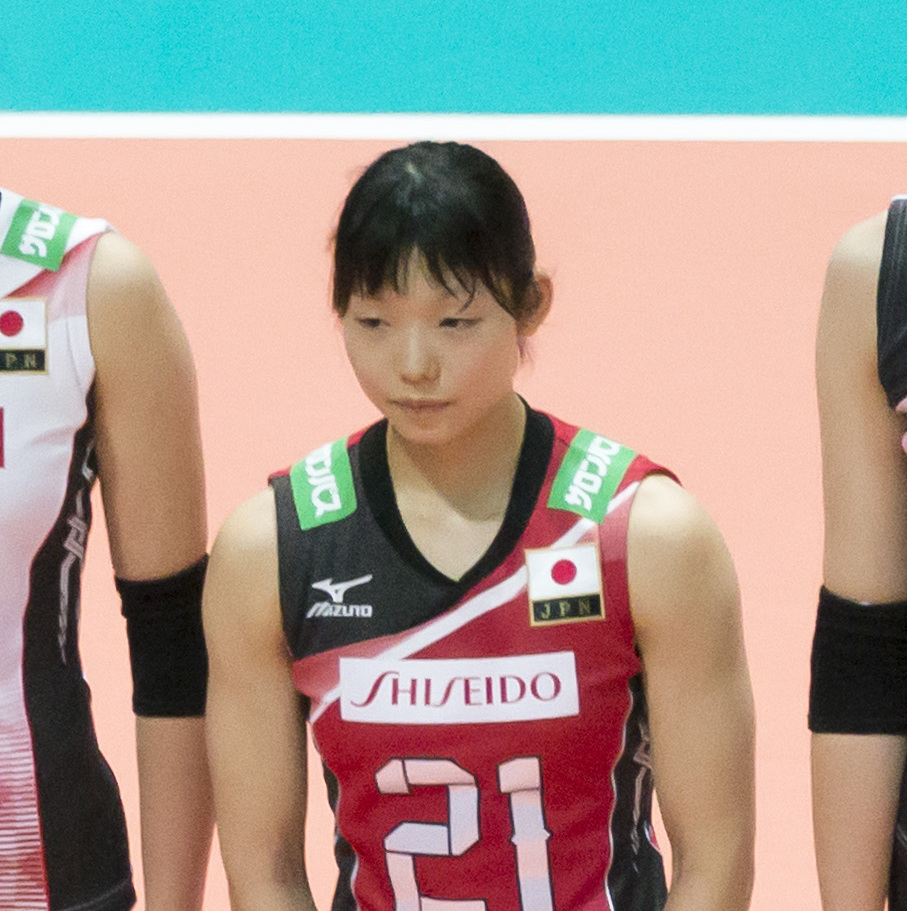

Personal information
- Full name: Kotoe Inoue
- Nickname: Koto
- Born: February 15, 1990 (age 36) Kyoto, Japan
- Height: 1.61 m (5 ft 3 in)
- Weight: 55 kg (121 lb)
- Spike: 285 cm (112 in)

Volleyball information
- Position: Libero
- Current club: (United States) LOVB Austin
- Number: 15

National team
- Years: Team
- –: Japan

Kotoe Inoue (井上琴絵 Inoue Kotoe, born February 15, 1990) is a Japanese volleyball player who plays for LOVB Austin.

== Career ==
While attending high school, her volleyball team won in the Domestic Sports Festival.

Inoue won the bronze medal and the Best Libero award at the 2010 Asian Club Championship.

Inoue won the 2017 World Grand Champions Cup Best Libero award.

== Clubs ==
- (Japan) JT Marvelous (2008–2018)
- (Romania) CSM București (2018–2019)
- (Japan) Denso Airybees (2019–2021)
- (Japan) NEC Red Rockets (2021–2023)
- (Israel) Hapoel Kfar Saba (2023–2024)
- (Thailand) Nakhon Ratchasima Huione QminC (2023–2024)
- (United States) LOVB Austin (2024-present)

== Awards ==
=== Individuals ===
- 2007 6th Asian Youth Volleyball Championship - Best Libero award
- 2008 57th Kurowashiki All Japan Volleyball Tournament - New Face award
- 2008 14th Asian Junior Volleyball Championship - Best Libero award
- 2010 Asian Club Championship "Best Libero"'
- 2011 2010-11 V.Premier League - Best Libero award
- 2017 World Grand Champions Cup "Best Libero"

=== Clubs ===
- 2009-2010 V.Premier League - Runner-Up, with JT Marvelous.
- 2010 Kurowashiki All Japan Volleyball Tournament - Runner-Up, with JT Marvelous.
- 2010 Asian Club Championship - Bronze Medal with JT Marvelous.
- 2010-11 V.Premier League - Champion, with JT Marvelous.
- 2011 60th Kurowashiki All Japan Volleyball Tournament - Champion, with JT Marvelous.
- 2015 64th Kurowashiki All Japan Volleyball Tournament - Champion, with JT Marvelous.
- 2024 Asian Women's Club Volleyball Championship — Bronze Medal, with Nakhonratchasima Qminc VC

== National team ==
=== Senior team ===
- 2017 Asian Women's Volleyball Championship - Champion

=== Junior team ===
- 2007 Youth National Team - Champion
- 2008 Junior National Team - Champion

Awards
Preceded by (Japan) Arisa Satō	Best Libero of World Grand Champions Cup; 2017	Succeeded by TBD
