= Haleigh Washington =

American volleyball player (born 1995)

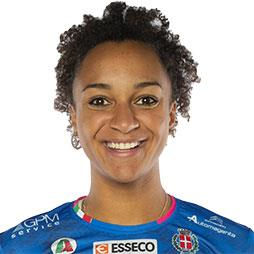
- Washington in 2022

Personal information
- Full name: Haleigh Meridian Washington
- Nationality: American
- Born: September 22, 1995 (age 31); Denver, Colorado, U.S.
- Height: 1.90 m (6 ft 3 in)
- Weight: 82 kg (181 lb)
- Spike: 307 cm (121 in)
- Block: 295 cm (116 in)
- Education: Pennsylvania State University

Volleyball information
- Position: Middle Blocker
- Current club: (United States) LOVB Salt Lake
- Number: 22 (national team) 15 (LOVB Salt Lake)

Career
Years	Teams
2014–2017	(United States) Penn State
2017–2018	(Italy) Olimpia Ravenna (it)
2018–2019	(Italy) Volley Millenium Brescia
2019–2020	(Italy) Busto Arsizio Volley
2020–2022	(Italy) Igor Gorgonzola Novara
2022–2024	(Italy) Savino Del Bene Scandicci
2024–	(United States) LOVB Salt Lake

National team
2018–	United States
Medal record
Women's volleyball
Representing the United States
Olympic Games
Gold medal – first place	2020 Tokyo	Team
Silver medal – second place	2024 Paris	Team
FIVB World Cup
Silver medal – second place	2019 Japan	Team
FIVB Nations League
Gold medal – first place	2019 Nanjing	Team
Gold medal – first place	2021 Rimini	Team
Pan-American Cup
Gold medal – first place	2018 Santo Domingo
NORCECA
Silver medal – second place	2019 San Juan

Haleigh Meridian Washington (born September 22, 1995) is an American volleyball player of the United States women's national volleyball team. Washington was an All-American middle blocker for the Penn State women's volleyball team, where she helped lead the team to the 2014 NCAA national championship. Washington won gold with the national team at the 2020 Tokyo Summer Olympics.

== Personal life ==
Washington was born in Denver, Colorado to parents Danielle and Alecs. In her early athletic days, she showed talent in basketball, but ended up being more passionate about volleyball while on the seventh-grade team. She would attend Clear Creek High School, where she began being recruited by college volleyball coaches in her freshman year. Her family relocated to Colorado Springs before her junior year, and she finished her high school career at Doherty High School, where she holds a state record after putting down 48 kills in a match with her high school team.

She earned consecutive Colorado Volleyball Player of the Year honors in 2012 and 2013 and led her team to a state championship title in 2012, and was the 2013 Volleyball Magazine National Player of the Year. She was considered to be the nation's top high school recruit in her class, and ultimately decided to play collegiate volleyball at Penn State.

Washington has one brother, Kayden, and one sister, Leilani. In 2020, Washington came out as bisexual.

== Penn State ==
Washington was a three-time first-team All-American and helped lead the team to the 2014 NCAA National Title as a freshman, as well as an appearance in the 2017 Final Four in her senior season. She was named the Big Ten Freshman of the Year after hitting .463 for the season. In her senior season, she earned the 2017 Big Ten Defensive Player of the Year, and led the nation with a .503 hitting percentage, while putting down 3.03 kills per set on the season. She earned AVCA All-American honors three times and was selected as a Honda Sports Award nominee after her senior season.

Washington credited Penn State's head coach Russ Rose for acclimating her to the grueling demands and expectations of competing on the international stage.

== Professional clubs ==
Washington has played in multiple Italian Series A1 professional volleyball teams, including Igor Gorgonzola Novara from 2020 to 2022. In the 2022–2023 season, plays with Savino Del Bene Scandicci.

== United States national team ==
With Team USA, she started all three matches of the 2019 Tokyo Qualification Tournament in which Team USA earned its bid into the 2020 Olympic Games.

She was named to the 18-player roster of the 2021 FIVB Volleyball Women's Nations League. In her first match as the starting middle, had nine kills and a block against Brazil.

On June 7, 2021, US National Team head coach Karch Kiraly announced she would be part of the 12-player Olympic roster for the 2020 Summer Olympics in Tokyo. Washington helped lead her team to the USA's first ever gold medal and was named Best Middle Blocker of the tournament.

== Awards and honors ==
=== International ===
- 2019 FIVB Nations League – "Best Middle Blocker"
- 2020 Summer Olympics – "Best Middle Blocker"

=== Professional clubs ===
- 2022–23 Women's CEV Cup - Champion, with Savino del Bene Scandicci
- 2021–22 Italian Serie A1 League – Bronze medal, with Novara
- 2021–22 Italian Cup (Coppa Italia) – Silver medal, with Novara
- 2021–22 Italian Super Cup – Silver medal, with Novara
- 2020–21 CEV Women's Champions League – Bronze medal, with Novara
- 2020–21 Italian Cup (Coppa Italia) – Silver medal, with Novara
- 2020–21 Italian Serie A1 League – Silver medal, with Novara
- 2020–21 Italian Super Cup – Bronze medal, with Novara
- 2019–20 Italian Cup (Coppa Italia) – Silver medal, with Busto

=== College ===
- 2014 NCAA Division I National Champions
- 2014 Big Ten Freshman of the Year
- 2014 Unanimous All-Big Ten Freshman Team
- 2014 NCAA Louisville Regional All-Tournament
- 2014 All-Big Ten
- AVCA First Team All-American (2015, 2016, 2017)
- Unanimous All-Big Ten selection (2015, 2016, 2017)
- 2015 B1G/Pac-12 Challenge Most Valuable Player
- 2016 CoSIDA Third-Team Academic All-America
- 2017 Senior CLASS Award winner in NCAA Division I volleyball
- 2017 Big Ten Defensive Player of the Year

== See also ==
- List of Pennsylvania State University Olympians

Awards
Preceded by (Serbia) Milena Rašić (United States) Foluke Akinradewo	Best Middle Blockers of Olympic Games; 2020 (with (Brazil) Carol Gattaz)	Succeeded by Incumbent
Preceded by (United States) TeTori Dixon (Turkey) Eda Erdem Dündar	Best Middle Blockers of FIVB Nations League; 2019 (with (Brazil) Ana Beatriz Corrêa)	Succeeded by (Turkey) Eda Erdem Dündar (Brazil) Carol Gattaz
