= Fort Bend Epicenter =

Indoor arena in Rosenberg, Texas

- Location within Texas Location within the United States
- Address: 28505 Southwest Freeway
- Location: Rosenberg, Texas, U.S.
- Coordinates: 29.52964°N 95.81565°W
- Owner: Stonehenge LLC
- Operator: The Sports Facilities Companies
- Capacity: 8,600 (expandable to 10,000)

Construction
- Groundbreaking: November 15, 2021
- Opened: August 26, 2023
- Cost: US$120 million
- Architect: PBK Architects

Tenant
- LOVB Houston (LOVB Pro) (2025–present)

Website
- fbepicenter.com

The Fort Bend Epicenter (sometimes stylized as EpiCenter) is a 230,000 square foot (21,368 m^{2}) multi-purpose arena and event space in the Houston suburb of Rosenberg, Texas. It is one of two home venues of LOVB Houston in LOVB Pro. The facility comprises an 8,600-seat arena, conference rooms, a multi-purpose area, and an outdoor pavilion. The arena is owned by Stonehenge LLC, with ownership transferring to Fort Bend County following its bond repayment to the private firm by 2050.

It is named for being at the geographic center of Fort Bend County.

== History ==
In 2015, Fort Bend County officials began considering building an arena that could provide more events outside of downtown Houston. A feasibility study was conducted thereafter and ended in 2018. The project was unanimously approved by the Fort Bend County Commissioners Court on February 23, 2021. On November 15, 2021, a groundbreaking ceremony was held for the Epicenter. The arena opened on August 26, 2023.

== Facilities ==
The facility's arena can host large-scale events such as concerts and graduation ceremonies, while its multi-purpose area can host smaller events, such as basketball tournaments. The outdoor pavilion is intended for outdoor sports or livestock events.

== Notable events and tenants ==
In October 2023, All Elite Wrestling taped episodes of Dynamite and Rampage at the arena.

In July 2024, it was announced professional volleyball team LOVB Houston of LOVB Pro would be playing their home matches at the arena as the first major permanent tenant. Their first match was on January 9, 2025.
