= Lifetime Activities Center =

Arena in Taylorsville, Utah

- Bruin Arena
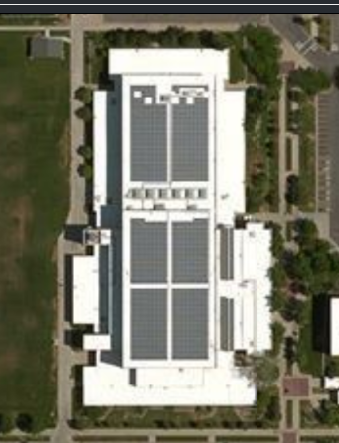

- Location of arena in Utah / United States Lifetime Activities Center (the United States)
- Location: South Redwood Road; Salt Lake City, Utah, United States
- Coordinates: 40°40′22″N 111°56′44″W
- Owner: Salt Lake Community College
- Capacity: 5,000
- Scoreboard: Yes

Construction
- Opened: 1996

Tenants
- Salt Lake Community College Bruins (NJCAA) (1996-present); Utah Eagles (CBA) (2006–2007); Salt Lake City Stars (NBAGL) (2016–2022)

Website
- slcc.edu/lac

The Lifetime Activities Center is a 5,000-seat multi-purpose arena in Taylorsville, Utah, on campus of Salt Lake Community College. The arena hosts the Bruins' basketball team, and formerly the G League affiliate of the Utah Jazz, the Salt Lake City Stars. Every February through March, it hosts Utah high school girls' basketball championships. In addition to the 5,000-seat arena, it also hosts a fitness center and weight room, as well as classrooms for SLCC classes.
