= LOVB Austin =

American volleyball team

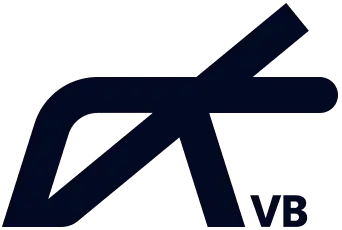
- Founded: 2023
- Ground: H-E-B Center at Cedar Park; Cedar Park, Texas, U.S. Frost Bank Center; San Antonio, Texas, U.S. Strahan Arena (2025); San Marcos, Texas, U.S.
- Chairman: David Blitzer; Peter Holt; Amy Griffin
- Manager: Erik Sullivan
- League: LOVB Pro
- 2026: Champions; 3rd in LOVB Pro
- Website: www.lovb.com/teams/lovb-austin-volleyball
- Championships: 2 (2025, 2026)

LOVB Austin is an American professional women's indoor volleyball team based in Austin, Texas. It is a member of LOVB Pro, which began play in January 2025.

== History ==
In 2021, LOVB announced plans to start a professional women's volleyball league in the United States. Austin, home of the Texas Longhorns women's volleyball team, was announced as LOVB's sixth team location in December 2023. Carli Lloyd was the team's founding player. Austin's inaugural roster for the 2025 season featured eight former Texas Longhorns, including Madisen Skinner, Logan Eggleston, Asjia O'Neal, Saige Ka'aha'aina-Torres, and Zoe Jarvis. Finishing in 5th place in the 6-team LOVB Pro's inaugural season, Austin would win the LOVB Finals, defeating LOVB Omaha 3 sets to 0 in the title match after coming from 2-0 down to win both their quarterfinal and semifinal matches.

In June 2025, LOVB Austin was announced as the first LOVB Pro franchise to have non-league ownership. The team is now owned by a group headed by David Blitzer, Peter Holt (investing through his San Antonio-based Spurs Sports & Entertainment), and Amy Griffin. As part of the sale, the trio also acquired an equity stake in the league.

== Roster ==
LOVB Austin roster
No.	Nat.	Player	Pos.	Height	From
1	(United States)	Khat Bell	Opposite Hitter	6 ft 2 in (1.88 m)	Texas
2	(United States)	Leah Hardeman	Outside Hitter	5 ft 10 in (1.78 m)	Coastal Carolina
3	(United States)	Carli Lloyd	Setter	5 ft 11 in (1.80 m)	California
4	(United States)	Madi Banks	Outside Hitter	6 ft 3 in (1.91 m)	Nebraska
5	(United States)	Molly McCage	Middle Blocker	6 ft 4 in (1.93 m)	Texas
6	(United States)	Madisen Skinner	Opposite Hitter	6 ft 2 in (1.88 m)	Texas / Kentucky
7	(United States)	Asjia O'Neal	Middle Blocker	6 ft 3 in (1.91 m)	Texas
10	(United States)	Zoe Jarvis	Libero	5 ft 7 in (1.70 m)	Texas
11	(United States)	Bella Bergmark	Middle Blocker	6 ft 3 in (1.91 m)	Texas / California
13	(United States)	Juliann Faucette	Opposite Hitter	6 ft 2 in (1.88 m)	Texas
15	(Japan)	Kotoe Inoue	Libero	5 ft 3 in (1.60 m)	
17	(Canada)	Brie O'Reilly	Setter	6 ft 0 in (1.83 m)	
22	(United States)	Bailey Miller	Outside Hitter	6 ft 3 in (1.91 m)	Arizona State / West Virginia
33	(United States)	Logan Eggleston	Outside Hitter	6 ft 2 in (1.88 m)	Texas
33	(Poland)	Magdalena Jurczyk	Middle Blocker	6 ft 0 in (1.83 m)	
Updated as of: February 2, 2026 | Source:

== Season standings ==
- 2025: 5th (5–11), Champions (19 points)
- 2026: 3rd (10–10), Champions (26 points)
