= LOVB Atlanta =

American volleyball team

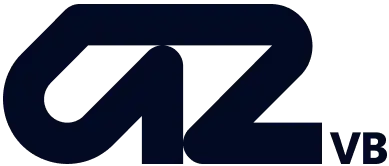
- Founded: 2023
- Ground: Gateway Center Arena; College Park, Georgia, U.S. McCamish Pavilion; Atlanta, Georgia, U.S. Overtime Elite Arena; Atlanta, Georgia, U.S.
- Manager: Paulo Coco
- League: LOVB Pro
- 2026: Semi-final; 2nd in LOVB Pro
- Website: www.lovb.com/teams/lovb-atlanta-volleyball
- Championships: None

LOVB Atlanta is an American professional women's indoor volleyball team based in Atlanta, Georgia. It is a member of LOVB Pro, which began play in January 2025.

== History ==
In 2021, LOVB announced plans to start a professional women's volleyball league in the United States. Atlanta was revealed as one of LOVB's first two team locations alongside Houston in March 2023. The city also hosted the Atlanta Vibe of the rival Pro Volleyball Federation.

== Roster ==
As of January 18, 2026.

No.	Name	Position	Height	College / home club	Nationality
2	Piyanut Pannoy	Libero	5 ft 6 in (1.68 m)		Thailand
6	Miroslava Paskova	Outside hitter	5 ft 11 in (1.80 m)		Bulgaria
7	Ella May Powell	Setter	6 ft 0 in (1.83 m)	Washington	United States
10	Rachel Fairbanks	Setter	6 ft 0 in (1.83 m)	Pittsburgh	United States
11	Onye Ofoegbu	Middle blocker	6 ft 3 in (1.91 m)	Oregon / UC Irvine	United States
12	Carly DeHoog	Opposite hitter	6 ft 4 in (1.93 m)	Washington	United States
13	McKenzie Adams	Outside hitter	6 ft 4 in (1.93 m)	UTSA	United States
14	Tia Jimerson	Middle blocker	6 ft 3 in (1.91 m)	Ohio	United States
15	Magdalena Jehlárová	Middle blocker	6 ft 3 in (1.91 m)	Washington State	Czech Republic
16	Beatrice Negretti	Libero	5 ft 7 in (1.70 m)		Italy
17	Tessa Grubbs	Opposite hitter	6 ft 3 in (1.91 m)	Tennessee	United States
18	Ivonee Montaño	Opposite hitter	6 ft 2 in (1.88 m)		Colombia
19	Jess Robinson	Middle blocker	6 ft 2 in (1.88 m)	Michigan / Duke	United States
22	Julia Sangiacomo	Outside hitter	6 ft 5 in (1.96 m)	Northwestern / Santa Clara	United States
24	Eva Hudson	Outside hitter	6 ft 1 in (1.85 m)	Kentucky / Purdue	United States

== Season standings ==
- 2025: 1st (13–3), Semifinals (37 points)
- 2026: 2nd (11–9), Semifinals (35 points)
