= 2018 FIVB Women's Volleyball Nations League squads =

This article shows the roster of all participating teams at the 2018 FIVB Women's Volleyball Nations League. The 16 national teams involved in the tournament were required to register a squad of 21 players, which every week's 14-player roster must be selected from. Each country must declare its 14-player roster two days before the start of each week's round-robin competition.

== Argentina ==
A preliminary squad with 26 names was announced on 26 April 2018.

Head coach: Guillermo Orduna

No.	Name	Date of birth	Height	Weight	Spike	Block	2017–18 club
1	Priscila Bosio	11 March 1994	1.82 m (6 ft 0 in)	72 kg (159 lb)	292 cm (115 in)	275 cm (108 in)	(Argentina) Avellaneda
2	Tanya Acosta	11 March 1991	1.82 m (6 ft 0 in)	70 kg (150 lb)	287 cm (113 in)	280 cm (110 in)	(Brazil) Pinheiros
3	Yamila Nizetich	27 January 1989	1.81 m (5 ft 11 in)	74 kg (163 lb)	305 cm (120 in)	295 cm (116 in)	(Italy) Pesaro
6	Elina Rodríguez	11 February 1997	1.89 m (6 ft 2 in)	72 kg (159 lb)	300 cm (120 in)	284 cm (112 in)	(Argentina) San Lorenzo
7	Natalia Aispurúa	20 December 1991	1.92 m (6 ft 4 in)	78 kg (172 lb)	310 cm (120 in)	293 cm (115 in)	(Argentina) Boca Juniors
8	Sol Piccolo	11 September 1996	1.84 m (6 ft 0 in)	74 kg (163 lb)	294 cm (116 in)	282 cm (111 in)	(Argentina) Vélez Sarsfield
9	Clarisa Sagardía	29 June 1989	1.74 m (5 ft 9 in)	67 kg (148 lb)	290 cm (110 in)	280 cm (110 in)	(Greece) Makedones
10	Anahi Tosi	10 July 1998	1.81 m (5 ft 11 in)	60 kg (130 lb)	290 cm (110 in)	272 cm (107 in)	(Argentina) 9 de Julio
11	Julieta Lazcano	25 June 1989	1.90 m (6 ft 3 in)	74 kg (163 lb)	312 cm (123 in)	293 cm (115 in)	(France) Saint-Cloud Paris
12	Tatiana Rizzo	30 December 1986	1.78 m (5 ft 10 in)	64 kg (141 lb)	280 cm (110 in)	268 cm (106 in)	(Brazil) Rio do Sul
15	Antonela Fortuna	10 May 1995	1.75 m (5 ft 9 in)	61 kg (134 lb)	285 cm (112 in)	275 cm (108 in)	(Argentina) San Lorenzo
16	Florencia Busquets	27 June 1989	1.92 m (6 ft 4 in)	68 kg (150 lb)	305 cm (120 in)	290 cm (110 in)	(Switzerland) Franches-Montagnes
17	Helena Vidal	6 January 1989	1.86 m (6 ft 1 in)	71 kg (157 lb)	300 cm (120 in)	293 cm (115 in)	(Switzerland) Lugano
18	Victoria Mayer	19 June 2001	1.80 m (5 ft 11 in)	59 kg (130 lb)	285 cm (112 in)	265 cm (104 in)	(Argentina) Santa Fe
19	Morena Franchi	19 February 1993	1.64 m (5 ft 5 in)	62 kg (137 lb)	285 cm (112 in)	264 cm (104 in)	(Poland) Budowlani Toruń
22	Camila Hiruela	1 February 1997	1.76 m (5 ft 9 in)	77 kg (170 lb)	287 cm (113 in)	280 cm (110 in)	(Argentina) River Plate
23	Victoria Michel Tosi	1 July 1999	1.82 m (6 ft 0 in)	69 kg (152 lb)	283 cm (111 in)	273 cm (107 in)	(Argentina) Echagüe
24	Victoria Zabala	5 June 1992	1.80 m (5 ft 11 in)	60 kg (130 lb)	298 cm (117 in)	285 cm (112 in)	(Argentina) Boca Juniors
25	Bianca Farriol	18 December 2001	1.80 m (5 ft 11 in)	68 kg (150 lb)	290 cm (110 in)	270 cm (110 in)	(Argentina) Universidad La Matanza
26	Agostina Soria	9 October 1998	1.79 m (5 ft 10 in)	65 kg (143 lb)	279 cm (110 in)	271 cm (107 in)	(Argentina) Vélez Sarsfield
27	Candelaria Salinas	23 May 2000	1.83 m (6 ft 0 in)	64 kg (141 lb)	278 cm (109 in)	265 cm (104 in)	(Argentina) Boca Juniors

== Belgium ==
Head coach: Gert Vande Broek

No.	Name	Date of birth	Height	Weight	Spike	Block	2017–18 club
1	Lisa Neyt	2 September 1993	1.75 m (5 ft 9 in)	71 kg (157 lb)	277 cm (109 in)	265 cm (104 in)	(Belgium) Gent
2	Elise Van Sas	1 August 1997	1.88 m (6 ft 2 in)	74 kg (163 lb)	296 cm (117 in)	281 cm (111 in)	(Belgium) Oudegem
3	Britt Herbots	24 September 1999	1.82 m (6 ft 0 in)	63 kg (139 lb)	310 cm (120 in)	290 cm (110 in)	(France) Mulhouse
4	Nathalie Lemmens	12 March 1995	1.92 m (6 ft 4 in)	85 kg (187 lb)	311 cm (122 in)	288 cm (113 in)	(Belgium) Asterix Kieldrecht
6	Laure Flament	18 June 1998	1.82 m (6 ft 0 in)	76 kg (168 lb)	295 cm (116 in)	288 cm (113 in)	(Belgium) Gent
7	Celine Van Gestel	7 November 1997	1.83 m (6 ft 0 in)	70 kg (150 lb)	310 cm (120 in)	280 cm (110 in)	(Belgium) Asterix Kieldrecht
8	Kaja Grobelna	4 January 1995	1.88 m (6 ft 2 in)	72 kg (159 lb)	318 cm (125 in)	299 cm (118 in)	(Poland) Budowlani Łódź
11	Iris Vandewiele	7 March 1994	1.89 m (6 ft 2 in)	71 kg (157 lb)	295 cm (116 in)	286 cm (113 in)	(Belgium) Gent
12	Dominika Strumilo	26 December 1996	1.87 m (6 ft 2 in)	63 kg (139 lb)	311 cm (122 in)	292 cm (115 in)	(Germany) Dresdner
13	Marlies Janssens	4 June 1997	1.93 m (6 ft 4 in)	79 kg (174 lb)	312 cm (123 in)	299 cm (118 in)	(Belgium) Asterix Kieldrecht
14	Lotte Vandendriessche	5 April 1997	1.97 m (6 ft 6 in)	79 kg (174 lb)	293 cm (115 in)	280 cm (110 in)	(Belgium) Oudegem
16	Karolina Goliat	25 October 1996	1.90 m (6 ft 3 in)	79 kg (174 lb)	308 cm (121 in)	295 cm (116 in)	(France) Saint-Raphaël
17	Ilka Van de Vyver (c)	26 January 1993	1.70 m (5 ft 7 in)	79 kg (174 lb)	296 cm (117 in)	273 cm (107 in)	(Germany) Vilsbiburg
18	Oriane Moulin	18 February 2000	1.81 m (5 ft 11 in)	63 kg (139 lb)	303 cm (119 in)	287 cm (113 in)	(Belgium) Tchalou
19	Silke Van Avermaet	2 June 1999	1.92 m (6 ft 4 in)	76 kg (168 lb)	311 cm (122 in)	290 cm (110 in)	(Belgium) Asterix Kieldrecht
20	Jodie Guilliams	26 April 1997	1.80 m (5 ft 11 in)	73 kg (161 lb)	305 cm (120 in)	289 cm (114 in)	(Belgium) Asterix Kieldrecht
21	Manon Stragier	12 March 1999	1.82 m (6 ft 0 in)	69 kg (152 lb)	308 cm (121 in)	283 cm (111 in)	(Belgium) Richa Michelbeke
22	Anna Valkenborg	4 January 1998	1.74 m (5 ft 9 in)	59 kg (130 lb)	290 cm (110 in)	270 cm (110 in)	(Belgium) Datovoc Tongeren
23	Bieke Kindt	11 February 2000	1.91 m (6 ft 3 in)	74 kg (163 lb)	302 cm (119 in)	284 cm (112 in)	(Belgium) Oudegem
25	Britt Rampelberg	5 June 2000	1.65 m (5 ft 5 in)	58 kg (128 lb)	283 cm (111 in)	269 cm (106 in)	(Belgium) Vilvoorde
28	Lara Nagels	3 June 1997	1.80 m (5 ft 11 in)	65 kg (143 lb)	290 cm (110 in)	274 cm (108 in)	(Belgium) Oudegem

== Brazil ==
A preliminary squad with 26 names was announced on 24 April 2018.

Head coach: José Roberto Guimarães

No.	Name	Date of birth	Height	Weight	Spike	Block	2017–18 club
1	Mara Leão	26 July 1991	1.90 m (6 ft 3 in)	77 kg (170 lb)	310 cm (120 in)	297 cm (117 in)	(Brazil) Minas Tênis Clube
3	Macris Carneiro	3 March 1989	1.78 m (5 ft 10 in)	68 kg (150 lb)	292 cm (115 in)	285 cm (112 in)	(Brazil) Minas Tênis Clube
4	Ana Carolina da Silva	8 April 1991	1.83 m (6 ft 0 in)	73 kg (161 lb)	290 cm (110 in)	290 cm (110 in)	(Turkey) Nilüfer
5	Adenízia da Silva	18 December 1986	1.86 m (6 ft 1 in)	63 kg (139 lb)	312 cm (123 in)	290 cm (110 in)	(Italy) Scandicci
6	Thaísa Menezes	15 May 1987	1.96 m (6 ft 5 in)	79 kg (174 lb)	316 cm (124 in)	301 cm (119 in)	(Brazil) Barueri
7	Rosamaria Montibeller	9 April 1994	1.85 m (6 ft 1 in)	76 kg (168 lb)	291 cm (115 in)	285 cm (112 in)	(Brazil) Minas Tênis Clube
8	Jaqueline Carvalho	31 December 1983	1.87 m (6 ft 2 in)	70 kg (150 lb)	302 cm (119 in)	286 cm (113 in)	(Brazil) Barueri
9	Roberta Ratzke (c)	28 April 1990	1.85 m (6 ft 1 in)	71 kg (157 lb)	287 cm (113 in)	278 cm (109 in)	(Brazil) Rio de Janeiro
10	Gabriela Guimarães	19 May 1994	1.80 m (5 ft 11 in)	69 kg (152 lb)	295 cm (116 in)	274 cm (108 in)	(Brazil) Rio de Janeiro
11	Gabriella Souza	14 December 1993	1.76 m (5 ft 9 in)	69 kg (152 lb)	296 cm (117 in)	273 cm (107 in)	(Brazil) Rio de Janeiro
13	Amanda Francisco	16 August 1988	1.80 m (5 ft 11 in)	62 kg (137 lb)	304 cm (120 in)	286 cm (113 in)	(Brazil) Praia Clube
14	Drussyla Costa	1 July 1996	1.82 m (6 ft 0 in)	73 kg (161 lb)	304 cm (120 in)	286 cm (113 in)	(Brazil) Rio de Janeiro
15	Monique Pavão	31 October 1986	1.80 m (5 ft 11 in)	67 kg (148 lb)	294 cm (116 in)	285 cm (112 in)	(Brazil) Rio de Janeiro
16	Tandara Caixeta	30 October 1988	1.84 m (6 ft 0 in)	87 kg (192 lb)	305 cm (120 in)	297 cm (117 in)	(Brazil) Osasco
17	Suelen Pinto	4 October 1987	1.66 m (5 ft 5 in)	81 kg (179 lb)	256 cm (101 in)	238 cm (94 in)	(Brazil) Praia Clube
18	Juma Silva	17 January 1993	1.81 m (5 ft 11 in)	65 kg (143 lb)	0 cm (0 in)	0 cm (0 in)	(Brazil) Bauru
20	Ana Beatriz Corrêa	7 February 1992	1.87 m (6 ft 2 in)	70 kg (150 lb)	298 cm (117 in)	292 cm (115 in)	(Brazil) Osasco
21	Mariana Costa	30 July 1986	1.81 m (5 ft 11 in)	73 kg (161 lb)	295 cm (116 in)	283 cm (111 in)	(Brazil) Osasco
24	Bruna Silva	3 July 1989	1.81 m (5 ft 11 in)	80 kg (180 lb)	300 cm (120 in)	288 cm (113 in)	(Brazil) Pinheiros
25	Priscila Daroit	10 August 1988	1.82 m (6 ft 0 in)	74 kg (163 lb)	290 cm (110 in)	280 cm (110 in)	(Brazil) Minas Tênis Clube
26	Milka Silva	18 July 1994	1.90 m (6 ft 3 in)	0 kg (0 lb)	0 cm (0 in)	0 cm (0 in)	(Brazil) Pinheiros

== China ==
A preliminary squad with 26 names was announced on 24 April 2018.

Head coach: Lang Ping

No.	Name	Date of birth	Height	Weight	Spike	Block	2017–18 club
1	Yuan Xinyue	21 December 1996	2.01 m (6 ft 7 in)	78 kg (172 lb)	317 cm (125 in)	311 cm (122 in)	(China) Army
2	Zhu Ting (c)	29 November 1994	1.98 m (6 ft 6 in)	78 kg (172 lb)	327 cm (129 in)	300 cm (120 in)	(Turkey) Vakıfbank Istanbul
3	Yang Fangxu	6 October 1994	1.90 m (6 ft 3 in)	82 kg (181 lb)	308 cm (121 in)	300 cm (120 in)	(China) Shandong
4	Yang Hanyu	12 October 1999	1.92 m (6 ft 4 in)	72 kg (159 lb)	317 cm (125 in)	311 cm (122 in)	(China) Shandong
5	Gao Yi	22 July 1998	1.94 m (6 ft 4 in)	66 kg (146 lb)	304 cm (120 in)	298 cm (117 in)	(China) Army
6	Gong Xiangyu	21 April 1997	1.86 m (6 ft 1 in)	72 kg (159 lb)	313 cm (123 in)	302 cm (119 in)	(China) Jiangsu
7	Wang Yuanyuan	14 July 1997	1.95 m (6 ft 5 in)	75 kg (165 lb)	312 cm (123 in)	300 cm (120 in)	(China) Tianjin
8	Zeng Chunlei	3 November 1989	1.87 m (6 ft 2 in)	67 kg (148 lb)	315 cm (124 in)	315 cm (124 in)	(China) Beijing
10	Liu Xiaotong	16 February 1990	1.88 m (6 ft 2 in)	80 kg (180 lb)	312 cm (123 in)	300 cm (120 in)	(China) Beijing
11	Yao Di	15 August 1992	1.82 m (6 ft 0 in)	65 kg (143 lb)	306 cm (120 in)	298 cm (117 in)	(China) Tianjin
12	Li Yingying	19 February 2000	1.96 m (6 ft 5 in)	71 kg (157 lb)	302 cm (119 in)	294 cm (116 in)	(China) Tianjin
13	Diao Linyu	7 April 1994	1.82 m (6 ft 0 in)	69 kg (152 lb)	309 cm (122 in)	303 cm (119 in)	(China) Jiangsu
15	Lin Li	5 July 1992	1.71 m (5 ft 7 in)	65 kg (143 lb)	294 cm (116 in)	294 cm (116 in)	(China) Fujian
16	Ding Xia	13 January 1990	1.80 m (5 ft 11 in)	67 kg (148 lb)	305 cm (120 in)	300 cm (120 in)	(China) Liaoning
17	Yan Ni	2 March 1987	1.92 m (6 ft 4 in)	74 kg (163 lb)	317 cm (125 in)	306 cm (120 in)	(China) Liaoning
18	Wang Mengjie	14 November 1995	1.72 m (5 ft 8 in)	65 kg (143 lb)	289 cm (114 in)	280 cm (110 in)	(China) Shandong
19	Liu Yanhan	19 January 1993	1.88 m (6 ft 2 in)	75 kg (165 lb)	315 cm (124 in)	305 cm (120 in)	(China) Army
20	Duan Fang	26 December 1994	1.86 m (6 ft 1 in)	73 kg (161 lb)	301 cm (119 in)	296 cm (117 in)	(China) Liaoning
21	Zhang Yichan	11 February 1991	1.87 m (6 ft 2 in)	76 kg (168 lb)	318 cm (125 in)	307 cm (121 in)	(China) Shanghai
25	Hu Mingyuan	17 May 1996	1.87 m (6 ft 2 in)	69 kg (152 lb)	305 cm (120 in)	297 cm (117 in)	(China) Liaoning
26	Meng Zixuan	18 November 1996	1.80 m (5 ft 11 in)	62 kg (137 lb)	298 cm (117 in)	290 cm (110 in)	(China) Tianjin

== Dominican Republic ==
Head coach: Marcos Kwiek

No.	Name	Date of birth	Height	Weight	Spike	Block	2017–18 club
1	Annerys Vargas	7 August 1981	1.96 m (6 ft 5 in)	70 kg (150 lb)	327 cm (129 in)	320 cm (130 in)	Free agent
2	Winifer Fernández (L)	6 January 1995	1.69 m (5 ft 7 in)	62 kg (137 lb)	270 cm (110 in)	265 cm (104 in)	(Dominican Republic) Cienfuegos
3	Lisvel Elisa Eve	10 September 1991	1.94 m (6 ft 4 in)	70 kg (150 lb)	325 cm (128 in)	315 cm (124 in)	(Dominican Republic) Puerto Plata
4	Marianne Fersola	16 January 1992	1.91 m (6 ft 3 in)	60 kg (130 lb)	315 cm (124 in)	310 cm (120 in)	(Dominican Republic) Mirador
5	Brenda Castillo	5 June 1992	1.67 m (5 ft 6 in)	55 kg (121 lb)	245 cm (96 in)	230 cm (91 in)	(Dominican Republic) San Cristóbal
6	Camil Domínguez	7 December 1991	1.76 m (5 ft 9 in)	75 kg (165 lb)	232 cm (91 in)	275 cm (108 in)	(Dominican Republic) Mirador
7	Niverka Marte	19 October 1990	1.78 m (5 ft 10 in)	71 kg (157 lb)	295 cm (116 in)	283 cm (111 in)	(Dominican Republic) Deportivo Nacional
8	Cándida Arias	11 March 1992	1.94 m (6 ft 4 in)	68 kg (150 lb)	320 cm (130 in)	315 cm (124 in)	(Dominican Republic) San Cristóbal
10	Natalia Martínez	25 November 2000	1.86 m (6 ft 1 in)	71 kg (157 lb)	310 cm (120 in)	300 cm (120 in)	(Dominican Republic) Mirador
11	Jeoselyna Rodríguez	9 December 1991	1.87 m (6 ft 2 in)	63 kg (139 lb)	325 cm (128 in)	315 cm (124 in)	(Dominican Republic) Mirador
12	Yokaty Pérez	6 August 1998	1.78 m (5 ft 10 in)	79 kg (174 lb)	291 cm (115 in)	257 cm (101 in)	(Dominican Republic) Los Cachorros
14	Prisilla Rivera	29 December 1984	1.83 m (6 ft 0 in)	67 kg (148 lb)	309 cm (122 in)	305 cm (120 in)	(Dominican Republic) San Pedro de Macorís
16	Yonkaira Peña	10 May 1993	1.90 m (6 ft 3 in)	70 kg (150 lb)	320 cm (130 in)	310 cm (120 in)	(Brazil) Rio de Janeiro
17	Gina Mambrú	21 January 1986	1.82 m (6 ft 0 in)	65 kg (143 lb)	330 cm (130 in)	315 cm (124 in)	(Dominican Republic) Los Cachorros
18	Bethania de la Cruz	13 May 1987	1.88 m (6 ft 2 in)	70 kg (150 lb)	330 cm (130 in)	320 cm (130 in)	(Italy) Scandicci
19	Ana Binet	9 February 1992	1.74 m (5 ft 9 in)	58 kg (128 lb)	280 cm (110 in)	260 cm (100 in)	(Dominican Republic) Samaná
20	Brayelin Martínez	11 September 1996	2.01 m (6 ft 7 in)	83 kg (183 lb)	330 cm (130 in)	320 cm (130 in)	(Italy) Casalmaggiore
21	Jineiry Martínez	3 December 1997	1.90 m (6 ft 3 in)	68 kg (150 lb)	305 cm (120 in)	280 cm (110 in)	(Dominican Republic) Mirador
23	Gaila González	25 June 1997	1.88 m (6 ft 2 in)	73 kg (161 lb)	304 cm (120 in)	276 cm (109 in)	(Dominican Republic) Mirador
24	Vielka Peralta	13 April 1999	1.86 m (6 ft 1 in)	56 kg (123 lb)	310 cm (120 in)	305 cm (120 in)	(Dominican Republic) Deportivo Nacional
26	Larysmer Caro	18 October 1996	1.74 m (5 ft 9 in)	68 kg (150 lb)	288 cm (113 in)	258 cm (102 in)	(Dominican Republic) Deportivo Nacional

== Germany ==
A preliminary squad with 26 names was announced on 26 April 2018.

Head coach: Felix Koslowski

No.	Name	Date of birth	Height	Weight	Spike	Block	2017–18 club
1	Lenka Dürr	10 December 1990	1.71 m (5 ft 7 in)	59 kg (130 lb)	280 cm (110 in)	270 cm (110 in)	(Romania) Târgoviște
2	Pia Kästner	29 June 1998	1.82 m (6 ft 0 in)	68 kg (150 lb)	297 cm (117 in)	286 cm (113 in)	(Germany) Stuttgart
3	Denise Hanke	31 August 1989	1.79 m (5 ft 10 in)	58 kg (128 lb)	284 cm (112 in)	272 cm (107 in)	(Germany) Schweriner
4	Maren Brinker (c)	10 July 1986	1.84 m (6 ft 0 in)	68 kg (150 lb)	303 cm (119 in)	295 cm (116 in)	(Turkey) Çanakkale
5	Jana Franziska Poll	7 May 1988	1.85 m (6 ft 1 in)	69 kg (152 lb)	310 cm (120 in)	290 cm (110 in)	(Greece) Olympiacos
6	Jennifer Geerties	5 April 1994	1.84 m (6 ft 0 in)	58 kg (128 lb)	298 cm (117 in)	288 cm (113 in)	(Germany) Schweriner
7	Jennifer Pettke	29 May 1989	1.87 m (6 ft 2 in)	71 kg (157 lb)	302 cm (119 in)	290 cm (110 in)	(Germany) Vilsbiburg
8	Kimberly Drewniok	11 August 1997	1.88 m (6 ft 2 in)	73 kg (161 lb)	311 cm (122 in)	298 cm (117 in)	(Germany) Wiesbaden
10	Lena Stigrot	20 December 1994	1.84 m (6 ft 0 in)	68 kg (150 lb)	303 cm (119 in)	295 cm (116 in)	(Germany) Vilsbiburg
11	Louisa Lippmann	23 September 1994	1.91 m (6 ft 3 in)	78 kg (172 lb)	319 cm (126 in)	312 cm (123 in)	(Germany) Schweriner
12	Hanna Orthmann	3 October 1998	1.88 m (6 ft 2 in)	74 kg (163 lb)	302 cm (119 in)	291 cm (115 in)	(Italy) Monza
13	Magdalena Gryka	28 March 1994	1.78 m (5 ft 10 in)	65 kg (143 lb)	290 cm (110 in)	280 cm (110 in)	(Poland) Ostrowiec Świętokrzyski
14	Marie Schölzel	1 August 1997	1.88 m (6 ft 2 in)	66 kg (146 lb)	307 cm (121 in)	299 cm (118 in)	(Germany) Schweriner
15	Barbara Roxana Wezorke	12 April 1993	1.85 m (6 ft 1 in)	75 kg (165 lb)	305 cm (120 in)	290 cm (110 in)	(Germany) Vilsbiburg
16	Elisa Lohmann	22 July 1998	1.74 m (5 ft 9 in)	60 kg (130 lb)	290 cm (110 in)	278 cm (109 in)	(Germany) Schweriner
17	Anna Pogany	21 July 1994	1.70 m (5 ft 7 in)	60 kg (130 lb)	280 cm (110 in)	270 cm (110 in)	(Switzerland) Aesch Pfeffingen
18	Leonie Schwertmann	12 January 1994	1.90 m (6 ft 3 in)	80 kg (180 lb)	300 cm (120 in)	290 cm (110 in)	(Germany) Vilsbiburg
20	Vanessa Agbortabi	4 December 1998	1.81 m (5 ft 11 in)	65 kg (143 lb)	298 cm (117 in)	283 cm (111 in)	(Germany) Vilsbiburg
21	Ivana Vanjak	30 May 1995	1.90 m (6 ft 3 in)	70 kg (150 lb)	315 cm (124 in)	306 cm (120 in)	(Germany) Münster
22	Lisa Gründing	2 December 1991	1.86 m (6 ft 1 in)	68 kg (150 lb)	303 cm (119 in)	291 cm (115 in)	(Germany) Potsdam
24	Denise Imoudu	14 December 1995	1.80 m (5 ft 11 in)	67 kg (148 lb)	290 cm (110 in)	280 cm (110 in)	(Germany) Potsdam

== Italy ==
Head coach: Davide Mazzanti

No.	Name	Date of birth	Height	Weight	Spike	Block	2017–18 club
1	Serena Ortolani	7 January 1987	1.87 m (6 ft 2 in)	63 kg (139 lb)	320 cm (130 in)	240 cm (94 in)	(Italy) Monza
2	Alice Degradi	4 October 1996	1.82 m (6 ft 0 in)	75 kg (165 lb)	312 cm (123 in)	300 cm (120 in)	(Italy) Legnano
3	Carlotta Cambi	28 May 1996	1.77 m (5 ft 10 in)	66 kg (146 lb)	302 cm (119 in)	292 cm (115 in)	(Italy) Pesaro
4	Sara Bonifacio	3 July 1996	1.88 m (6 ft 2 in)	75 kg (165 lb)	328 cm (129 in)	310 cm (120 in)	(Italy) Novara
5	Ofelia Malinov	29 February 1996	1.85 m (6 ft 1 in)	70 kg (150 lb)	304 cm (120 in)	285 cm (112 in)	(Italy) Bergamo
6	Monica De Gennaro	8 January 1987	1.74 m (5 ft 9 in)	67 kg (148 lb)	292 cm (115 in)	217 cm (85 in)	(Italy) Conegliano
8	Alessia Orro	18 July 1998	1.80 m (5 ft 11 in)	74 kg (163 lb)	308 cm (121 in)	231 cm (91 in)	(Italy) Busto Arsizio
9	Rossella Olivotto	27 April 1991	1.86 m (6 ft 1 in)	72 kg (159 lb)	313 cm (123 in)	300 cm (120 in)	(Italy) Pesaro
10	Cristina Chirichella (c)	10 February 1994	1.95 m (6 ft 5 in)	79 kg (174 lb)	322 cm (127 in)	306 cm (120 in)	(Italy) Novara
11	Anna Danesi	20 April 1996	1.98 m (6 ft 6 in)	78 kg (172 lb)	312 cm (123 in)	294 cm (116 in)	(Italy) Conegliano
12	Anastasia Guerra	15 October 1996	1.87 m (6 ft 2 in)	69 kg (152 lb)	312 cm (123 in)	294 cm (116 in)	(Italy) Casalmaggiore
13	Sarah Fahr	12 September 2001	1.94 m (6 ft 4 in)	84 kg (185 lb)	322 cm (127 in)	206 cm (81 in)	(Italy) Club Italia
14	Elena Pietrini	17 March 2000	1.90 m (6 ft 3 in)	73 kg (161 lb)	330 cm (130 in)	206 cm (81 in)	(Italy) Club Italia
15	Marina Lubian	11 April 2000	1.95 m (6 ft 5 in)	73 kg (161 lb)	318 cm (125 in)	300 cm (120 in)	(Italy) Club Italia
16	Lucia Bosetti	9 July 1989	1.80 m (5 ft 11 in)	63 kg (139 lb)	310 cm (120 in)	292 cm (115 in)	(Italy) Scandicci
17	Miriam Sylla	8 January 1995	1.87 m (6 ft 2 in)	80 kg (180 lb)	320 cm (130 in)	240 cm (94 in)	(Italy) Bergamo
18	Paola Egonu	18 December 1998	1.93 m (6 ft 4 in)	80 kg (180 lb)	344 cm (135 in)	321 cm (126 in)	(Italy) Novara
19	Camilla Mingardi	19 October 1997	1.82 m (6 ft 0 in)	86 kg (190 lb)	300 cm (120 in)	280 cm (110 in)	(Italy) Modena
20	Beatrice Parrocchiale	26 December 1995	1.68 m (5 ft 6 in)	59 kg (130 lb)	286 cm (113 in)	258 cm (102 in)	(Italy) Firenze
21	Ilaria Spirito	20 February 1994	1.74 m (5 ft 9 in)	56 kg (123 lb)	250 cm (98 in)	243 cm (96 in)	(Italy) Club Italia
23	Beatrice Berti	12 January 1996	1.93 m (6 ft 4 in)	87 kg (192 lb)	304 cm (120 in)	288 cm (113 in)	(Italy) Busto Arsizio

== Japan ==
Head coach: Kumi Nakada

No.	Name	Date of birth	Height	Weight	Spike	Block	2017–18 club
1	Miyu Nagaoka	25 July 1991	1.79 m (5 ft 10 in)	64 kg (141 lb)	308 cm (121 in)	303 cm (119 in)	(Japan) Hisamitsu Springs
2	Sarina Koga	21 May 1996	1.80 m (5 ft 11 in)	67 kg (148 lb)	302 cm (119 in)	290 cm (110 in)	(Japan) Red Rockets
3	Nana Iwasaka (c)	3 July 1990	1.87 m (6 ft 2 in)	75 kg (165 lb)	300 cm (120 in)	293 cm (115 in)	(Japan) Hisamitsu Springs
4	Risa Shinnabe	11 July 1990	1.73 m (5 ft 8 in)	64 kg (141 lb)	292 cm (115 in)	285 cm (112 in)	(Japan) Hisamitsu Springs
6	Haruka Miyashita	1 September 1994	1.77 m (5 ft 10 in)	61 kg (134 lb)	291 cm (115 in)	272 cm (107 in)	(Japan) Okayama Seagulls
7	Yuki Ishii	8 May 1991	1.80 m (5 ft 11 in)	68 kg (150 lb)	302 cm (119 in)	287 cm (113 in)	(Japan) Hisamitsu Springs
8	Mami Uchiseto	25 October 1991	1.70 m (5 ft 7 in)	74 kg (163 lb)	293 cm (115 in)	285 cm (112 in)	(Italy) Olbia
9	Haruyo Shimamura	4 March 1992	1.82 m (6 ft 0 in)	78 kg (172 lb)	298 cm (117 in)	280 cm (110 in)	(Japan) Red Rockets
10	Koyomi Tominaga	1 May 1989	1.75 m (5 ft 9 in)	68 kg (150 lb)	297 cm (117 in)	280 cm (110 in)	(Japan) Ageo Medics
11	Yurie Nabeya	15 December 1993	1.76 m (5 ft 9 in)	55 kg (121 lb)	302 cm (119 in)	292 cm (115 in)	(Japan) Denso Airybees
12	Miya Sato	7 March 1990	1.75 m (5 ft 9 in)	62 kg (137 lb)	284 cm (112 in)	280 cm (110 in)	(Japan) Hitachi Rivale
13	Mai Okumura	31 October 1990	1.77 m (5 ft 10 in)	69 kg (152 lb)	297 cm (117 in)	285 cm (112 in)	(Japan) JT Marvelous
15	Kotoe Inoue	15 February 1990	1.62 m (5 ft 4 in)	55 kg (121 lb)	288 cm (113 in)	275 cm (108 in)	(Japan) JT Marvelous
18	Saori Takahashi	9 December 1992	1.77 m (5 ft 10 in)	66 kg (146 lb)	307 cm (121 in)	290 cm (110 in)	(Japan) Queenseis
19	Mari Horikawa	3 May 1992	1.83 m (6 ft 0 in)	72 kg (159 lb)	301 cm (119 in)	288 cm (113 in)	(Japan) Toray Arrows
20	Arisa Inoue	8 May 1995	1.78 m (5 ft 10 in)	66 kg (146 lb)	300 cm (120 in)	285 cm (112 in)	(Japan) Hisamitsu Springs
21	Ai Kurogo	14 June 1998	1.80 m (5 ft 11 in)	69 kg (152 lb)	306 cm (120 in)	295 cm (116 in)	(Japan) Toray Arrows
22	Kanami Tashiro	25 March 1991	1.73 m (5 ft 8 in)	66 kg (146 lb)	283 cm (111 in)	273 cm (107 in)	(Japan) Toray Arrows
23	Akane Yamagishi	8 January 1991	1.65 m (5 ft 5 in)	55 kg (121 lb)	280 cm (110 in)	260 cm (100 in)	(Japan) Ageo Medics
24	Aika Akutagawa	3 April 1991	1.80 m (5 ft 11 in)	62 kg (137 lb)	304 cm (120 in)	280 cm (110 in)	(Japan) JT Marvelous
27	Mana Toe	18 May 1994	1.63 m (5 ft 4 in)	58 kg (128 lb)	272 cm (107 in)	264 cm (104 in)	(Japan) Hisamitsu Springs

== Netherlands ==
Head coach: Jamie Morrison

No.	Name	Date of birth	Height	Weight	Spike	Block	2017–18 club
1	Kirsten Knip	14 September 1992	1.79 m (5 ft 10 in)	70 kg (150 lb)	281 cm (111 in)	275 cm (108 in)	(Germany) Ladies in Black
2	Femke Stoltenborg	30 July 1991	1.90 m (6 ft 3 in)	81 kg (179 lb)	303 cm (119 in)	299 cm (118 in)	(Germany) Stuttgart
3	Yvon Beliën	28 December 1993	1.88 m (6 ft 2 in)	73 kg (161 lb)	307 cm (121 in)	303 cm (119 in)	(Turkey) Bursa
4	Celeste Plak	26 October 1995	1.90 m (6 ft 3 in)	87 kg (192 lb)	314 cm (124 in)	302 cm (119 in)	(Italy) Novara
5	Robin de Kruijf	5 May 1991	1.93 m (6 ft 4 in)	81 kg (179 lb)	313 cm (123 in)	300 cm (120 in)	(Italy) Conegliano
6	Maret Balkestein-Grothues (c)	16 September 1988	1.80 m (5 ft 11 in)	68 kg (150 lb)	304 cm (120 in)	285 cm (112 in)	(Italy) Casalmaggiore
7	Juliet Lohuis	10 September 1996	1.90 m (6 ft 3 in)	77 kg (170 lb)	305 cm (120 in)	295 cm (116 in)	(Germany) Münster
8	Sarah Van Aalen	21 January 2000	1.83 m (6 ft 0 in)	68 kg (150 lb)	300 cm (120 in)	293 cm (115 in)	(Netherlands) Arnhem
9	Myrthe Schoot	29 August 1988	1.84 m (6 ft 0 in)	70 kg (150 lb)	298 cm (117 in)	286 cm (113 in)	(Germany) Dresdner
10	Lonneke Slöetjes	15 November 1990	1.92 m (6 ft 4 in)	76 kg (168 lb)	322 cm (127 in)	315 cm (124 in)	(Turkey) Vakıfbank Istanbul
11	Anne Buijs	2 December 1991	1.91 m (6 ft 3 in)	73 kg (161 lb)	317 cm (125 in)	299 cm (118 in)	(Turkey) Nilüfer
12	Britt Bongaerts	3 November 1996	1.85 m (6 ft 1 in)	68 kg (150 lb)	296 cm (117 in)	284 cm (112 in)	(Germany) Ladies in Black
13	Demi Korevaar	9 August 2000	1.87 m (6 ft 2 in)	71 kg (157 lb)	311 cm (122 in)	303 cm (119 in)	(Netherlands) Arnhem
14	Laura Dijkema	18 February 1990	1.84 m (6 ft 0 in)	70 kg (150 lb)	293 cm (115 in)	279 cm (110 in)	(Italy) Firenze
16	Susanne Kos	5 January 2000	1.70 m (5 ft 7 in)	64 kg (141 lb)	275 cm (108 in)	268 cm (106 in)	(Netherlands) Arnhem
17	Nicole Oude Luttikhuis	26 December 1997	1.91 m (6 ft 3 in)	82 kg (181 lb)	312 cm (123 in)	305 cm (120 in)	(Germany) Ladies in Black
18	Marrit Jasper	28 February 1996	1.80 m (5 ft 11 in)	75 kg (165 lb)	300 cm (120 in)	285 cm (112 in)	(Germany) Dresdner
19	Nika Daalderop	29 November 1998	1.89 m (6 ft 2 in)	72 kg (159 lb)	317 cm (125 in)	308 cm (121 in)	(Germany) Stuttgart
20	Tessa Polder	10 October 1997	1.89 m (6 ft 2 in)	76 kg (168 lb)	301 cm (119 in)	293 cm (115 in)	(Germany) Ladies in Black
22	Nicole Koolhaas	31 January 1991	1.98 m (6 ft 6 in)	77 kg (170 lb)	310 cm (120 in)	300 cm (120 in)	(Romania) București
24	Hester Jasper	7 May 2001	1.75 m (5 ft 9 in)	63 kg (139 lb)	295 cm (116 in)	287 cm (113 in)	(Netherlands) Sneek

== Poland ==
A preliminary squad with 27 names was announced on 19 April 2018.

Head coach: Jacek Nawrocki

No.	Name	Date of birth	Height	Weight	Spike	Block	2017–18 club
1	Julia Nowicka	21 October 1998	1.74 m (5 ft 9 in)	58 kg (128 lb)	295 cm (116 in)	278 cm (109 in)	(Poland) Bielsko-Biała
2	Gabriela Polańska	27 November 1988	2.02 m (6 ft 8 in)	81 kg (179 lb)	308 cm (121 in)	299 cm (118 in)	(Poland) Budowlani Łódź
3	Klaudia Alagierska	2 January 1996	1.90 m (6 ft 3 in)	76 kg (168 lb)	297 cm (117 in)	290 cm (110 in)	(Poland) Legionovia Legionowo
4	Marlena Pleśnierowicz	9 January 1992	1.76 m (5 ft 9 in)	61 kg (134 lb)	295 cm (116 in)	281 cm (111 in)	(Poland) Bielsko-Biała
5	Agnieszka Kąkolewska (c)	17 October 1994	1.97 m (6 ft 6 in)	75 kg (165 lb)	309 cm (122 in)	295 cm (116 in)	(Poland) Budowlani Łódź
6	Justyna Łukasik	27 January 1993	1.87 m (6 ft 2 in)	77 kg (170 lb)	301 cm (119 in)	285 cm (112 in)	(Poland) Kraków
7	Emilia Mucha	7 December 1993	1.86 m (6 ft 1 in)	78 kg (172 lb)	300 cm (120 in)	283 cm (111 in)	(Poland) Bielsko-Biała
8	Maria Stenzel	25 November 1998	1.68 m (5 ft 6 in)	53 kg (117 lb)	278 cm (109 in)	262 cm (103 in)	(Poland) Wrocław
9	Olivia Różański	5 June 1997	1.85 m (6 ft 1 in)	74 kg (163 lb)	315 cm (124 in)	300 cm (120 in)	(Poland) Bielsko-Biała
10	Zuzanna Efimienko	8 August 1989	1.97 m (6 ft 6 in)	72 kg (159 lb)	318 cm (125 in)	303 cm (119 in)	(Poland) ŁKS Łódź
12	Monika Bociek	6 April 1996	1.85 m (6 ft 1 in)	70 kg (150 lb)	302 cm (119 in)	287 cm (113 in)	(Poland) Muszyna
13	Agata Witkowska	19 August 1989	1.70 m (5 ft 7 in)	63 kg (139 lb)	280 cm (110 in)	275 cm (108 in)	(Poland) Budowlani Łódź
14	Martyna Łukasik	26 November 1999	1.89 m (6 ft 2 in)	75 kg (165 lb)	315 cm (124 in)	288 cm (113 in)	(Poland) Kraków
15	Martyna Grajber	28 March 1995	1.80 m (5 ft 11 in)	67 kg (148 lb)	293 cm (115 in)	276 cm (109 in)	(Poland) Budowlani Łódź
16	Natalia Mędrzyk	13 January 1992	1.83 m (6 ft 0 in)	73 kg (161 lb)	305 cm (120 in)	287 cm (113 in)	(Poland) Police
17	Malwina Smarzek	3 June 1996	1.91 m (6 ft 3 in)	80 kg (180 lb)	318 cm (125 in)	292 cm (115 in)	(Poland) Police
18	Alicja Grabka	9 May 1998	1.78 m (5 ft 10 in)	62 kg (137 lb)	290 cm (110 in)	280 cm (110 in)	(Poland) Legionovia Legionowo
20	Oliwia Bałuk	17 May 2000	1.75 m (5 ft 9 in)	62 kg (137 lb)	288 cm (113 in)	279 cm (110 in)	(Poland) Szczyrk
22	Natalia Murek	8 September 1999	1.80 m (5 ft 11 in)	70 kg (150 lb)	302 cm (119 in)	283 cm (111 in)	(Poland) Wrocław
23	Julia Twardowska	4 May 1995	1.85 m (6 ft 1 in)	66 kg (146 lb)	297 cm (117 in)	283 cm (111 in)	(Poland) Budowlani Łódź
26	Weronika Wołodko	9 October 1998	1.80 m (5 ft 11 in)	66 kg (146 lb)	297 cm (117 in)	280 cm (110 in)	(Poland) Wrocław

== Russia ==
Head coach: Vadim Pankov

No.	Name	Date of birth	Height	Weight	Spike	Block	2017–18 club
1	Angelina Lazarenko	13 April 1998	1.93 m (6 ft 4 in)	80 kg (180 lb)	320 cm (130 in)	305 cm (120 in)	(Switzerland) Voléro Zürich
2	Daria Talysheva	16 October 1991	1.82 m (6 ft 0 in)	67 kg (148 lb)	295 cm (116 in)	288 cm (113 in)	(Russia) Dinamo Moscow
3	Ekaterina Efimova	3 July 1993	1.92 m (6 ft 4 in)	70 kg (150 lb)	305 cm (120 in)	295 cm (116 in)	(Russia) Yenisey Krasnoyarsk
4	Daria Malygina	4 April 1994	2.02 m (6 ft 8 in)	82 kg (181 lb)	317 cm (125 in)	305 cm (120 in)	(Russia) Dinamo Kazan
5	Julia Kutyukova	30 March 1989	1.83 m (6 ft 0 in)	74 kg (163 lb)	0 cm (0 in)	299 cm (118 in)	(Russia) Leningradka Saint Petersburg
6	Irina Zaryazhko	4 October 1991	1.96 m (6 ft 5 in)	78 kg (172 lb)	305 cm (120 in)	290 cm (110 in)	(Russia) Dinamo Kazan
7	Tatiana Romanova	9 September 1994	1.78 m (5 ft 10 in)	64 kg (141 lb)	292 cm (115 in)	285 cm (112 in)	(Russia) Uralochka Yekaterinburg
8	Nataliya Goncharova	1 June 1989	1.94 m (6 ft 4 in)	75 kg (165 lb)	315 cm (124 in)	306 cm (120 in)	(Russia) Dinamo Moscow
10	Elena Novik	23 March 1994	1.80 m (5 ft 11 in)	66 kg (146 lb)	295 cm (116 in)	290 cm (110 in)	(Russia) Sakhalin
11	Ekaterina Lyubushkina	2 January 1990	1.88 m (6 ft 2 in)	81 kg (179 lb)	300 cm (120 in)	285 cm (112 in)	(Russia) Dinamo Moscow
12	Daria Ryseva	5 March 1998	1.75 m (5 ft 9 in)	69 kg (152 lb)	282 cm (111 in)	266 cm (105 in)	(Russia) Zarechye Odintsovo
14	Irina Fetisova	7 September 1994	1.90 m (6 ft 3 in)	76 kg (168 lb)	307 cm (121 in)	286 cm (113 in)	(Russia) Dinamo Moscow
15	Viktoriia Gorbacheva	2 April 1995	1.74 m (5 ft 9 in)	66 kg (146 lb)	284 cm (112 in)	276 cm (109 in)	(Russia) Leningradka Saint Petersburg
16	Irina Voronkova	20 October 1995	1.90 m (6 ft 3 in)	84 kg (185 lb)	305 cm (120 in)	290 cm (110 in)	(Russia) Dinamo Kazan
17	Natalia Malykh	8 December 1993	1.87 m (6 ft 2 in)	65 kg (143 lb)	308 cm (121 in)	297 cm (117 in)	(Russia) Dinamo Krasnodar
18	Kseniia Ilchenko	31 October 1994	1.83 m (6 ft 0 in)	64 kg (141 lb)	300 cm (120 in)	286 cm (113 in)	(Russia) Leningradka Saint Petersburg
19	Olga Biryukova	19 September 1994	1.93 m (6 ft 4 in)	74 kg (163 lb)	300 cm (120 in)	283 cm (111 in)	(Turkey) Beşiktaş
20	Anastasia Shlyakhovaya	5 October 1990	1.92 m (6 ft 4 in)	69 kg (152 lb)	313 cm (123 in)	307 cm (121 in)	(Russia) Dinamo Kazan
21	Anna Kotikova	13 October 1999	1.85 m (6 ft 1 in)	71 kg (157 lb)	306 cm (120 in)	300 cm (120 in)	(Russia) Dinamo Kazan
22	Tatiana Iurinskaia	25 January 1996	1.95 m (6 ft 5 in)	69 kg (152 lb)	305 cm (120 in)	275 cm (108 in)	(Russia) Zarechye Odintsovo
24	Kristina Kurnosova	17 June 1997	1.76 m (5 ft 9 in)	62 kg (137 lb)	288 cm (113 in)	278 cm (109 in)	(Russia) Dinamo Moscow

== Serbia ==
Head coach: Zoran Terzić

No.	Name	Date of birth	Height	Weight	Spike	Block	2017–18 club
1	Bianka Buša	25 July 1994	1.87 m (6 ft 2 in)	74 kg (163 lb)	312 cm (123 in)	298 cm (117 in)	(Poland) Police
2	Katarina Lazović	12 September 1999	1.82 m (6 ft 0 in)	65 kg (143 lb)	290 cm (110 in)	277 cm (109 in)	(Serbia) Vizura
4	Bojana Živković	29 March 1988	1.86 m (6 ft 1 in)	70 kg (150 lb)	298 cm (117 in)	283 cm (111 in)	(France) Le Cannet
5	Mina Popović	16 September 1994	1.87 m (6 ft 2 in)	73 kg (161 lb)	315 cm (124 in)	305 cm (120 in)	(Italy) Bergamo
6	Tijana Malešević	18 March 1991	1.85 m (6 ft 1 in)	78 kg (172 lb)	300 cm (120 in)	286 cm (113 in)	(Romania) Alba Blaj
7	Ana Antonijević	26 August 1987	1.85 m (6 ft 1 in)	71 kg (157 lb)	282 cm (111 in)	269 cm (106 in)	(Switzerland) Voléro Zürich
9	Brankica Mihajlović	13 April 1991	1.90 m (6 ft 3 in)	83 kg (183 lb)	302 cm (119 in)	290 cm (110 in)	(Japan) JT Marvelous
10	Slađana Mirković	8 October 1995	1.85 m (6 ft 1 in)	78 kg (172 lb)	293 cm (115 in)	283 cm (111 in)	(Poland) Police
11	Stefana Veljković	9 January 1990	1.90 m (6 ft 3 in)	76 kg (168 lb)	325 cm (128 in)	310 cm (120 in)	(Poland) Police
12	Teodora Pušić	12 March 1993	1.70 m (5 ft 7 in)	58 kg (128 lb)	270 cm (110 in)	260 cm (100 in)	(Germany) Stuttgart
13	Ana Bjelica	3 April 1992	1.90 m (6 ft 3 in)	78 kg (172 lb)	310 cm (120 in)	305 cm (120 in)	(Switzerland) Voléro Zürich
14	Maja Aleksić	6 June 1997	1.88 m (6 ft 2 in)	72 kg (159 lb)	302 cm (119 in)	289 cm (114 in)	(Serbia) Vizura
15	Jovana Stevanović	30 June 1992	1.92 m (6 ft 4 in)	72 kg (159 lb)	308 cm (121 in)	295 cm (116 in)	(Italy) Casalmaggiore
16	Milena Rašić (c)	25 October 1990	1.93 m (6 ft 4 in)	72 kg (159 lb)	315 cm (124 in)	310 cm (120 in)	(Turkey) Vakıfbank Istanbul
17	Silvija Popović	15 March 1986	1.78 m (5 ft 10 in)	65 kg (143 lb)	286 cm (113 in)	276 cm (109 in)	(Switzerland) Voléro Zürich
18	Tijana Bošković	8 March 1997	1.93 m (6 ft 4 in)	82 kg (181 lb)	315 cm (124 in)	300 cm (120 in)	(Turkey) Eczacıbaşı VitrA
19	Bojana Milenković	6 March 1997	1.85 m (6 ft 1 in)	70 kg (150 lb)	294 cm (116 in)	288 cm (113 in)	(Serbia) Crvena Zvezda
20	Jelena Blagojević	1 December 1988	1.81 m (5 ft 11 in)	67 kg (148 lb)	302 cm (119 in)	284 cm (112 in)	(Poland) Rzeszów
21	Jovana Jovičić	20 July 1994	1.84 m (6 ft 0 in)	75 kg (165 lb)	310 cm (120 in)	295 cm (116 in)	(Serbia) Železničar Lajkovac
22	Sara Lozo	29 April 1997	1.86 m (6 ft 1 in)	61 kg (134 lb)	295 cm (116 in)	290 cm (110 in)	(Serbia) Vizura
24	Aleksandra Ćirović	30 September 1997	1.75 m (5 ft 9 in)	57 kg (126 lb)	285 cm (112 in)	275 cm (108 in)	(Serbia) Vizura

== South Korea ==
The final squad was announced on 20 April 2018.

Head coach: Cha Hae-won

No.	Name	Date of birth	Height	Weight	Spike	Block	2017–18 club
1	Na Hyun-soo	15 September 1999	1.83 m (6 ft 0 in)	61 kg (134 lb)	285 cm (112 in)	267 cm (105 in)	(South Korea) Daejeon Yongsan High School
2	Kim Ju-hyang	27 March 1999	1.84 m (6 ft 0 in)	63 kg (139 lb)	283 cm (111 in)	274 cm (108 in)	(South Korea) Suwon
3	Kim Hae-ran	16 March 1984	1.68 m (5 ft 6 in)	60 kg (130 lb)	260 cm (100 in)	250 cm (98 in)	(South Korea) Incheon Pink Spiders
4	Kim Hee-jin	29 April 1991	1.85 m (6 ft 1 in)	79 kg (174 lb)	280 cm (110 in)	275 cm (108 in)	(South Korea) Hwaseong
5	Lee Hyo-hee	9 September 1980	1.73 m (5 ft 8 in)	58 kg (128 lb)	280 cm (110 in)	271 cm (107 in)	(South Korea) Gimcheon
6	Lee Na-yeon	25 March 1992	1.73 m (5 ft 8 in)	63 kg (139 lb)	270 cm (110 in)	260 cm (100 in)	(South Korea) Seoul
8	Yim Myung-ok	5 May 1986	1.75 m (5 ft 9 in)	60 kg (130 lb)	278 cm (109 in)	266 cm (105 in)	(South Korea) Gimcheon
9	Jeong Sun-ah	30 September 1998	1.84 m (6 ft 0 in)	71 kg (157 lb)	283 cm (111 in)	263 cm (104 in)	(South Korea) Gimcheon
10	Kim Yeon-koung (c)	26 February 1988	1.92 m (6 ft 4 in)	73 kg (161 lb)	350 cm (140 in)	340 cm (130 in)	(China) Shanghai
11	Kim Su-ji	11 July 1987	1.87 m (6 ft 2 in)	68 kg (150 lb)	335 cm (132 in)	320 cm (130 in)	(South Korea) Hwaseong
12	Kim Chae-yeon	11 December 1999	1.83 m (6 ft 0 in)	70 kg (150 lb)	290 cm (110 in)	279 cm (110 in)	(South Korea) Incheon Pink Spiders
13	Park Jeong-ah	26 March 1993	1.87 m (6 ft 2 in)	75 kg (165 lb)	300 cm (120 in)	290 cm (110 in)	(South Korea) Gimcheon
14	Yang Hyo-jin	14 December 1989	1.90 m (6 ft 3 in)	72 kg (159 lb)	340 cm (130 in)	332 cm (131 in)	(South Korea) Suwon
15	Kang So-hwi	18 July 1997	1.80 m (5 ft 11 in)	68 kg (150 lb)	295 cm (116 in)	278 cm (109 in)	(South Korea) Seoul
16	Kim Yeong-yeon	1 December 1993	1.63 m (5 ft 4 in)	54 kg (119 lb)	250 cm (98 in)	240 cm (94 in)	(South Korea) Suwon
17	Lee Jae-yeong	15 October 1996	1.79 m (5 ft 10 in)	64 kg (141 lb)	286 cm (113 in)	267 cm (105 in)	(South Korea) Incheon Pink Spiders
18	Yoo Seo-yeun	12 January 1999	1.74 m (5 ft 9 in)	62 kg (137 lb)	275 cm (108 in)	254 cm (100 in)	(South Korea) Gimcheon
19	Lee Da-yeong	15 October 1996	1.79 m (5 ft 10 in)	62 kg (137 lb)	282 cm (111 in)	263 cm (104 in)	(South Korea) Suwon
20	Na Hyun-jung	10 March 1990	1.63 m (5 ft 4 in)	54 kg (119 lb)	257 cm (101 in)	250 cm (98 in)	(South Korea) Seoul
21	Lee Won-jeong	12 January 2000	1.77 m (5 ft 10 in)	64 kg (141 lb)	270 cm (110 in)	270 cm (110 in)	(South Korea) Gimcheon
25	Park Eun-jin	15 December 1999	1.88 m (6 ft 2 in)	72 kg (159 lb)	295 cm (116 in)	280 cm (110 in)	(South Korea) Seonmyeong Girl's High School

== Thailand ==
A preliminary squad with 26 names was announced on 26 April 2018.

Head coach: Danai Sriwatcharamethakul

No.	Name	Date of birth	Height	Weight	Spike	Block	2017–18 club
1	Wipawee Srithong	28 January 1999	1.74 m (5 ft 9 in)	65 kg (143 lb)	288 cm (9 ft 5 in)	266 cm (8 ft 9 in)	(Thailand) Chonburi
2	Piyanut Pannoy	10 November 1989	1.71 m (5 ft 7 in)	62 kg (137 lb)	280 cm (9 ft 2 in)	275 cm (9 ft 0 in)	(Kazakhstan) Altay
3	Pornpun Guedpard	5 May 1993	1.70 m (5 ft 7 in)	63 kg (139 lb)	288 cm (9 ft 5 in)	279 cm (9 ft 2 in)	(Thailand) Bangkok
4	Thatdao Nuekjang	3 February 1994	1.84 m (6 ft 0 in)	72 kg (159 lb)	308 cm (10 ft 1 in)	296 cm (9 ft 9 in)	(Thailand) Khonkaen Star
5	Pleumjit Thinkaow (C)	9 November 1983	1.80 m (5 ft 11 in)	62 kg (137 lb)	305 cm (10 ft 0 in)	296 cm (9 ft 9 in)	(Thailand) Bangkok
6	Onuma Sittirak	13 June 1986	1.75 m (5 ft 9 in)	72 kg (159 lb)	304 cm (10 ft 0 in)	285 cm (9 ft 4 in)	(Thailand) Nakhon Ratchasima
7	Hattaya Bamrungsuk	12 August 1993	1.80 m (5 ft 11 in)	71 kg (157 lb)	292 cm (9 ft 7 in)	282 cm (9 ft 3 in)	(Thailand) Nakhon Ratchasima
8	Watchareeya Nualjam	22 July 1996	1.77 m (5 ft 10 in)	64 kg (141 lb)	292 cm (9 ft 7 in)	279 cm (9 ft 2 in)	(Thailand) Chonburi
9	Jarasporn Bundasak	1 March 1993	1.81 m (5 ft 11 in)	65 kg (143 lb)	291 cm (9 ft 7 in)	283 cm (9 ft 3 in)	(Thailand) Bangkok
10	Wilavan Apinyapong	6 June 1984	1.74 m (5 ft 9 in)	70 kg (150 lb)	294 cm (9 ft 8 in)	282 cm (9 ft 3 in)	(Thailand) Chonburi
11	Soraya Phomla	6 August 1992	1.69 m (5 ft 7 in)	60 kg (130 lb)	280 cm (9 ft 2 in)	270 cm (8 ft 10 in)	(Thailand) Chonburi
12	Tapaphaipun Chaisri	29 November 1989	1.68 m (5 ft 6 in)	70 kg (150 lb)	295 cm (9 ft 8 in)	276 cm (9 ft 1 in)	(Thailand) Khonkaen Star
13	Nootsara Tomkom	7 July 1985	1.69 m (5 ft 7 in)	57 kg (126 lb)	289 cm (9 ft 6 in)	278 cm (9 ft 1 in)	(Turkey) Fenerbahçe
14	Chitaporn Kamlangmak	17 March 1996	1.84 m (6 ft 0 in)	74 kg (163 lb)	290 cm (9 ft 6 in)	282 cm (9 ft 3 in)	(Thailand) Khonkaen Star
15	Malika Kanthong	8 January 1987	1.78 m (5 ft 10 in)	65 kg (143 lb)	292 cm (9 ft 7 in)	278 cm (9 ft 1 in)	(Thailand) Chonburi
16	Pimpichaya Kokram	16 June 1998	1.78 m (5 ft 10 in)	62 kg (137 lb)	293 cm (9 ft 7 in)	283 cm (9 ft 3 in)	(Thailand) Nonthaburi
18	Ajcharaporn Kongyot	18 June 1995	1.78 m (5 ft 10 in)	65 kg (143 lb)	298 cm (9 ft 9 in)	287 cm (9 ft 5 in)	(Thailand) Chonburi
19	Chatchu-on Moksri	6 November 1999	1.78 m (5 ft 10 in)	58 kg (128 lb)	298 cm (9 ft 9 in)	290 cm (9 ft 6 in)	(Thailand) Nakhon Ratchasima
20	Supattra Pairoj	27 June 1990	1.60 m (5 ft 3 in)	58 kg (128 lb)	275 cm (9 ft 0 in)	265 cm (8 ft 8 in)	(Thailand) Chonburi
21	Kullapa Piampongsan	17 March 1991	1.78 m (5 ft 10 in)	60 kg (130 lb)	280 cm (9 ft 2 in)	274 cm (9 ft 0 in)	(Thailand) Khonkaen Star
22	Hathairat Jarat	9 February 1996	1.82 m (6 ft 0 in)	65 kg (143 lb)	286 cm (9 ft 5 in)	277 cm (9 ft 1 in)	(Thailand) Khonkaen Star

== Turkey ==
Head coach: Giovanni Guidetti

No.	Name	Date of birth	Height	Weight	Spike	Block	2017–18 club
1	Hatice Gizem Örge	26 April 1993	1.72 m (5 ft 8 in)	59 kg (130 lb)	270 cm (110 in)	260 cm (100 in)	(Turkey) Vakıfbank Istanbul
2	Simge Şebnem Aköz	23 April 1991	1.68 m (5 ft 6 in)	55 kg (121 lb)	250 cm (98 in)	245 cm (96 in)	(Turkey) Eczacıbaşı VitrA
3	Kübra Akman	13 October 1994	1.98 m (6 ft 6 in)	89 kg (196 lb)	310 cm (120 in)	310 cm (120 in)	(Turkey) Vakıfbank Istanbul
4	Beyza Arıcı	27 July 1995	1.93 m (6 ft 4 in)	82 kg (181 lb)	302 cm (119 in)	293 cm (115 in)	(Turkey) Eczacıbaşı VitrA
5	Şeyma Ercan	5 July 1994	1.87 m (6 ft 2 in)	75 kg (165 lb)	302 cm (119 in)	295 cm (116 in)	(Turkey) Beşiktaş
7	Hande Baladın	1 September 1997	1.89 m (6 ft 2 in)	71 kg (157 lb)	310 cm (120 in)	300 cm (120 in)	(Turkey) Eczacıbaşı VitrA
8	Buse Ünal	29 July 1997	1.86 m (6 ft 1 in)	72 kg (159 lb)	280 cm (110 in)	270 cm (110 in)	(Turkey) Manisa
9	Meliha İsmailoğlu	17 September 1993	1.88 m (6 ft 2 in)	70 kg (150 lb)	310 cm (120 in)	301 cm (119 in)	(Turkey) Eczacıbaşı VitrA
10	Fulden Ural	3 January 1991	1.86 m (6 ft 1 in)	76 kg (168 lb)	310 cm (120 in)	305 cm (120 in)	(Turkey) Ankara
11	Aslıhan Kılıç	21 April 1998	1.78 m (5 ft 10 in)	71 kg (157 lb)	278 cm (109 in)	277 cm (109 in)	(Turkey) Ankara
12	Cansu Özbay	17 October 1996	1.82 m (6 ft 0 in)	75 kg (165 lb)	285 cm (112 in)	284 cm (112 in)	(Turkey) Vakıfbank Istanbul
13	Meryem Çalık	3 February 1988	1.95 m (6 ft 5 in)	63 kg (139 lb)	315 cm (124 in)	310 cm (120 in)	(Turkey) Seramiksan
14	Eda Erdem Dündar (c)	22 June 1987	1.88 m (6 ft 2 in)	73 kg (161 lb)	311 cm (122 in)	305 cm (120 in)	(Turkey) Fenerbahçe
16	Zehra Güneş	7 July 1999	2.03 m (6 ft 8 in)	82 kg (181 lb)	309 cm (122 in)	255 cm (100 in)	(Turkey) Vakıfbank Istanbul
18	Gamze Alikaya	1 January 1993	1.79 m (5 ft 10 in)	68 kg (150 lb)	300 cm (120 in)	280 cm (110 in)	(Turkey) Galatasaray
19	Ceren Kestirengöz	19 July 1993	1.88 m (6 ft 2 in)	82 kg (181 lb)	290 cm (110 in)	280 cm (110 in)	(Turkey) Beylikdüzü
20	Aylin Sarıoğlu	21 July 1995	1.68 m (5 ft 6 in)	67 kg (148 lb)	300 cm (120 in)	290 cm (110 in)	(Turkey) Bursa
55	Yagmur Mislina Kılıç	30 March 1996	1.89 m (6 ft 2 in)	66 kg (146 lb)	283 cm (111 in)	280 cm (110 in)	(Turkey) Türk Hava Yolları
90	Ebrar Karakurt	17 January 2000	1.96 m (6 ft 5 in)	72 kg (159 lb)	307 cm (121 in)	305 cm (120 in)	(Turkey) Vakıfbank Istanbul
98	Saliha Sahin	5 November 1998	1.85 m (6 ft 1 in)	62 kg (137 lb)	282 cm (111 in)	275 cm (108 in)	(Turkey) Karayolları
99	Yasemin Guveli	5 January 1999	1.87 m (6 ft 2 in)	68 kg (150 lb)	300 cm (120 in)	285 cm (112 in)	(Turkey) Karayolları

== United States ==
A preliminary squad with 26 names was announced on 19 April 2018.

Head coach: Karch Kiraly

No.	Name	Date of birth	Height	Weight	Spike	Block	2017–18 club
1	Micha Hancock	10 November 1992	1.80 m (5 ft 11 in)	76 kg (168 lb)	305 cm (120 in)	297 cm (117 in)	(Italy) Monza
3	Carli Lloyd	6 August 1989	1.80 m (5 ft 11 in)	75 kg (165 lb)	313 cm (123 in)	295 cm (116 in)	(Brazil) Barueri
4	Justine Wong-Orantes	6 October 1995	1.68 m (5 ft 6 in)	66 kg (146 lb)	282 cm (111 in)	277 cm (109 in)	(United States) University of Nebraska
5	Rachael Adams	3 June 1990	1.88 m (6 ft 2 in)	81 kg (179 lb)	318 cm (125 in)	307 cm (121 in)	(Turkey) Eczacıbaşı VitrA
6	TeTori Dixon	4 August 1992	1.91 m (6 ft 3 in)	83 kg (183 lb)	306 cm (120 in)	295 cm (116 in)	(Italy) Monza
7	Lauren Carlini	28 February 1995	1.86 m (6 ft 1 in)	77 kg (170 lb)	302 cm (119 in)	295 cm (116 in)	(Italy) Scandicci
8	Lauren Gibbemeyer	8 September 1988	1.87 m (6 ft 2 in)	71 kg (157 lb)	307 cm (121 in)	293 cm (115 in)	(Italy) Novara
9	Madison Kingdon	20 April 1993	1.84 m (6 ft 0 in)	78 kg (172 lb)	307 cm (121 in)	293 cm (115 in)	(South Korea) Hwaseong
10	Jordan Larson (c)	16 October 1986	1.90 m (6 ft 3 in)	75 kg (165 lb)	302 cm (119 in)	295 cm (116 in)	(Turkey) Eczacıbaşı VitrA
11	Andrea Drews	25 December 1993	1.91 m (6 ft 3 in)	77 kg (170 lb)	316 cm (124 in)	312 cm (123 in)	(Italy) Casalmaggiore
12	Kelly Murphy	20 October 1989	1.88 m (6 ft 2 in)	79 kg (174 lb)	315 cm (124 in)	307 cm (121 in)	Free agent
13	Sarah Wilhite	30 July 1995	1.85 m (6 ft 1 in)	75 kg (165 lb)	305 cm (120 in)	300 cm (120 in)	(Italy) Busto Arsizio
14	Michelle Bartsch-Hackley	12 February 1990	1.90 m (6 ft 3 in)	78 kg (172 lb)	305 cm (120 in)	296 cm (117 in)	(Italy) Busto Arsizio
15	Kim Hill	30 November 1989	1.93 m (6 ft 4 in)	72 kg (159 lb)	320 cm (130 in)	310 cm (120 in)	(Italy) Conegliano
16	Foluke Akinradewo	5 October 1987	1.91 m (6 ft 3 in)	79 kg (174 lb)	331 cm (130 in)	300 cm (120 in)	(Japan) Hisamitsu Springs
18	Aiyana Whitney	6 April 1993	1.94 m (6 ft 4 in)	71 kg (157 lb)	300 cm (120 in)	290 cm (110 in)	(China) Yunnan
20	Amanda Benson	9 March 1995	1.69 m (5 ft 7 in)	63 kg (139 lb)	265 cm (104 in)	257 cm (101 in)	(France) Nancy
22	Molly McCage	2 February 1994	1.91 m (6 ft 3 in)	75 kg (165 lb)	321 cm (126 in)	304 cm (120 in)	(Germany) Stuttgart
23	Kelsey Robinson	25 June 1992	1.88 m (6 ft 2 in)	73 kg (161 lb)	307 cm (121 in)	298 cm (117 in)	(Turkey) Vakıfbank Istanbul
25	Chiaka Ogbogu	15 April 1995	1.88 m (6 ft 2 in)	73 kg (161 lb)	318 cm (125 in)	307 cm (121 in)	(Italy) Firenze
27	Caroline Knop	25 January 1996	1.72 m (5 ft 8 in)	63 kg (139 lb)	283 cm (111 in)	278 cm (109 in)	(United States) University of Florida
