= Wołodko =

Wołodko is a Polish-language surname. The surname is derived from the given name Wolodko, a diminutive from "Wołodimierz".

Russian and Ukrainian languages equivalent: Volodko, Belarusian: Valadzko.

Notable people with this surname include:

- Stanisław Wołodko (1950–2021), Polish athlete
- Weronika Wołodko (born 1998), Polish women's volleyball player
