= Lexi Rodriguez =

American volleyball player (born 2003)

Personal information
- Full name: Alexis Rodriguez
- Nickname: Lexi
- Born: March 11, 2003 (age 23)
- Hometown: Sterling, Illinois, U.S.
- Height: 5 ft 5 in (165 cm)
- Education: Nebraska Cornhuskers (2021–2024)

Volleyball information
- Position: Libero
- Current club: LOVB Nebraska

Career
Years	Teams
2025–	LOVB Nebraska

National team
2019–	United States
Medal record
Women's volleyball
Representing United States
FIVB Girls' U19 World Championship
Gold medal – first place	2019 Egypt	Team

Alexis "Lexi" Rodriguez (born March 11, 2003) is an American professional volleyball libero for LOVB Nebraska of LOVB Pro. She played college volleyball for the Nebraska Cornhuskers, where she holds the program record for career digs. She was named AVCA All-American four times and Big Ten Defensive Player or Libero of the Year three times.

== Early life ==
Rodriguez was raised in Sterling, Illinois, the younger of two daughters born to Chris and Crystal Rodriguez. Her sister, Kaylee Martin, played college volleyball at Illinois State and Clemson. She attended Sterling High School, where she led the volleyball team to two Illinois state titles and set the school record for career digs. She was named the Illinois Gatorade Player of the Year in her junior season. She played club volleyball for Sports Performance Volleyball and Club Fusion Volleyball, winning three national titles. She was ranked by PrepVolleyball.com as the tenth-best recruit and top libero of the 2021 class. She later signed to the Nebraska volleyball team in 8th grade.

== College career ==
Rodriguez made a career-high 4.33 digs per set as a freshman with the Nebraska Cornhuskers. She helped Nebraska go 26–8 as they made the 2021 national championship game, where they lost 3–2 to Wisconsin. Rodriguez became the first libero to be named AVCA National Freshman of the Year. In her sophomore season, made 4.26 digs per set and helped Nebraska keep opponents to a nation-low 0.128 hitting percentage. Nebraska went 26–6 in the 2022 season, reaching the NCAA tournament regional semifinals. Rodriguez made 3.60 digs and a career-high 1.24 assists per set in her junior season. She led Nebraska to go 33–2, secure their first Big Ten title in six years, and make the 2023 national title game, where they lost 3–0 to defending champions Texas. She made 3.88 digs per set in her senior season as Nebraska went 33–3. In her final game, she passed Justine Wong-Orantes's program career digs record (finishing with 1,897) as Nebraska was reverse swept by Penn State in the semifinals of the NCAA tournament. Highly decorated throughout her college career, Rodriguez was named three-time first-team All-American (and once second-team All-American), four-time first-team All-Big Ten, two-time Big Ten Defensive Player of the Year, and one-time Big Ten Libero of the Year.

== Professional career ==
Two days after her last game for Nebraska, Rodriguez signed with LOVB Nebraska ahead of LOVB Pro's inaugural 2025 season.

== International career ==
Rodriguez played for the United States youth national team since the under-18 level. She helped win the 2019 FIVB Volleyball Girls' U18 World Championship and placed fifth at the 2021 FIVB Volleyball Women's U20 World Championship.

Rodriguez made her senior national team debut in the 2025 Volleyball Nations League. Later that summer, she was one of two liberos named to the roster for the FIVB Women's World Championship.

== Awards ==
- 2024: 95th AAU James E. Sullivan Award
