= Volleyball in the United States =

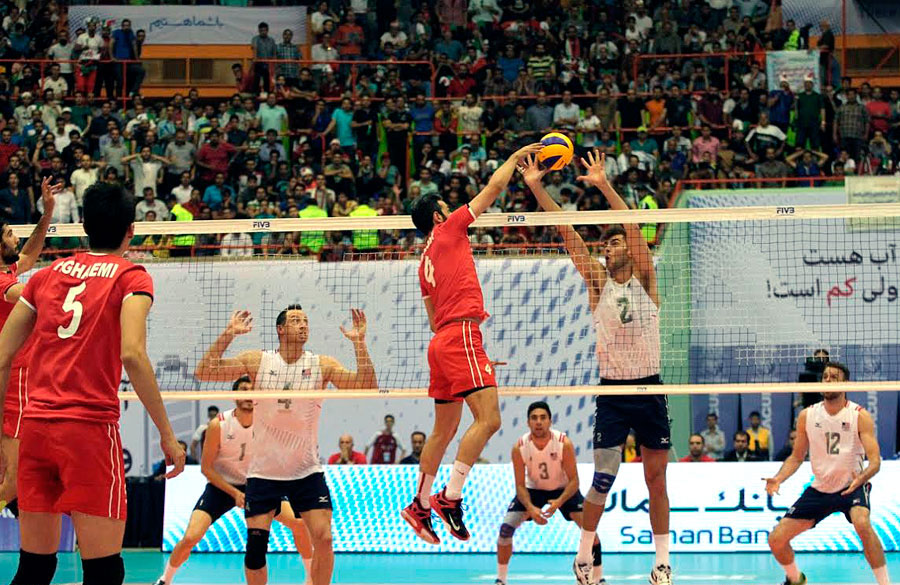
- Country: United States
- Governing body: USA Volleyball
- National team: United States
- First played: 1895, Holyoke, Massachusetts (USA)

National competitions
- League One Volleyball; Major League Volleyball

International competitions
- FIVB Men's/Women's World Championship; FIVB Men's/Women's World Cup; Summer Olympics

Volleyball is a popular sport in the United States with both male and female participants of all ages. Almost all high schools and colleges in the United States have female volleyball teams, and most regions of the country have developmental programs for girls of all ages as well. While many areas of the country are forming male teams and development programs, there are still fewer opportunities for young male athletes to play volleyball in the United States than for young female athletes. Men's volleyball is a fast-growing sport among high schools, with 36 states having male volleyball programs (though in several of these states, it is organized as a club sport and not sanctioned by the state's high school governing body). Most men's seasons are in the spring while women's seasons take place primarily in the fall; however, there are a few men's teams such as in Wisconsin, Virginia, and New York who play in the fall as well.

== National teams ==
The United States men's national volleyball team has won three gold medals at the 1984, 1988, and 2008 Olympic Games, the 1986 FIVB World Championship, the 1985 and 2015 FIVB Volleyball Men's World Cup, and the 2014 FIVB World League.

Meanwhile, the United States women's national volleyball team has won the 2020 Tokyo Olympics, the 2014 FIVB World Championship, six editions of the FIVB World Grand Prix, and the 2018, 2019 and 2021 FIVB Nations League. Also, they finished second at the 1984, 2008, 2012 and 2024 Olympic Games, the 1967 and 2002 FIVB World Championship, the 2005 and 2013 FIVB World Grand Champions, and the 2011 and 2019 FIVB World Cup.

== Professional volleyball ==
As a professional sport, volleyball has had limited success in the United States. International Volleyball Association was a co-ed professional league that existed from 1975 to 1980. Numerous attempts have been made to start professional indoor women's volleyball leagues. Major League Volleyball was a women's league with six teams that played for two-and-a-half seasons from 1987 to 1989 with games shown on ESPN on tape delay; it folded mid-season in 1989, however, due to financial losses. USA Volleyball Cup is an annual indoor volleyball championship. Two-man and two-woman professional beach volleyball leagues have done better, most notably the Association of Volleyball Professionals (AVP), but none have gained a wide following that would get them consistent coverage by the major television networks. In 2002, United States Professional Volleyball League was begun as a women's professional indoor league, but only lasted one season. In 2004 and again in 2005, NBC aired the Nissan Championship series, with Fox Sports carrying the majority of the season.

There has been a large push within the volleyball community to provide professional outlets for developing athletes. As of 2019 there are currently two leagues that branch across the United States. First of these is the National Volleyball Association (NVA) founded in 2017. The NVA currently has 12 teams. The second league is the Volleyball League of America (VLA) founded in 2019 and has 8 men's Tier 1 teams, 32 men's Tier 2 teams and 8 women's teams spread across the United States.

Professional women's indoor leagues saw a resurgence in the 2020s, starting with Athletes Unlimited Volleyball (AUV) in 2021. This league had a unique format, with 30 games taking place over five weeks and players changing teams weekly. In 2026, Athletes Unlimited announced they would be pausing their volleyball league for the 2026 and 2027 seasons. League One Volleyball (LOVB) was started in 2020 as a network of youth volleyball clubs, and expanded in 2025 to include a women's professional league called LOVB Pro. The league consisted of 6 teams for the first two seasons, and will expand to 10 teams in 2027. In 2024, the first Pro Volleyball Federation season started, which featured 7 women's teams. They expanded to 8 teams in 2025 and 9 teams in 2026, with 12 teams set to play in 2027. Major League Volleyball (MLV) was set to launch in 2026, with the Omaha Supernovas of the PVF moving over to become the league's founding franchise. However, in 2025 PVF and MLV reached a peace agreement, which kept all teams and investors together under the Major League Volleyball branding.

Liga de Voleibol Superior Masculino and Liga de Voleibol Superior Femenino are professional volleyball leagues in Puerto Rico.

NVA teams:

NVA members	Location	Established
LA Blaze	Los Angeles, CA	2019
Ontario Matadors	Ontario, CA	2019
Las Vegas Ramblers	Las Vegas, NV	2019
Southern Exposure	Orlando, FL	2019
Utah Stingers	Saint George, UT	2019
Orange County Stunners	Orange County, CA	2017
Team Freedom	Union, NJ	2019
Texas Tyrants	Dallas, Texas	2019
Dallas Tornadoes	Dallas, Texas	2021
Chicago Untouchables	Chicago, Illinois	2021
Seattle Sasquatch	Seattle, Washington	2022
Colorado Kraken	Aurora, Colorado	2022

VLA Tier 1 teams:

VLA members	Location	Established
Phoenix Ascension	Phoenix, AZ	2019
Chicago Icemen	Chicago, IL	2019
New York Team LVC	Albany, NY	2019
Indiana Team Pineapple	Angola, IN	2019
Southern California Rising Tide	Orange County, CA	2019
Northeast Force	Norwalk, CT	2022
Boston Bounce	Boston, MA	2021
Chicago Sweed	Chicago, IL	2022

=== Premier Volleyball League ===
A new indoor professional league, the Premier Volleyball League (sanctioned by USA Volleyball), began in 2012 with a women's division. In 2013 the PVL incorporated and launched a men's division. The PVL was discontinued in 2017.

Women's tournament
Team	Region	Founded	Results
Arizona Sizzle	Arizona	2012	2012: 5th 2013: 11th 2014:11th 2015: 3rd
Chesapeake Rising Tide	Chesapeake Bay (Maryland, Delaware, Washington, D.C., and Virginia)	2014	2014: 9th 2015: 7th
Florida Wave	Florida	2012	2012: 5th 2013: Runners-up; 2014: Runners-up; 2015: 4th
Gateway	Gateway (Southern Illinois and eastern Missouri)	2015	2015: 10th
Team GEVA	Garden Empire (New Jersey, most of New York, western Connecticut)	2014	2014: 5th 2015: 13th
Great Lakes	Great Lakes (Illinois)	2012	2012: 5th 2013: 7th 2014: 5th 2015: 5th
Team IE	Iroquois Empire (Northeast New York State)	2015	2015: 11th
Iowa Ice	Iowa	2012	2012: Runners-up; 2013: Champions; 2014: 3rd 2015: 6th
Lakeshore	Lakeshore (Michigan)	2015	2015: 7th
New England Night Riders	New England	2012	2012: 10th 2013: 10th 2014: 13th 2015: 13th
Team North Texas	North Texas	2012	2012: 3rd 2013: 5th 2015: Champions
NorCal Wildfire	Northern California	2012	2012: 5th 2013: 4th 2014: 11th 2015: 10th
SoCal Barricade	Southern California	2016	

Men's tournament
Team	Region	Founded	Results
Arizona Sizzle	Arizona	2014	2014: 7th 2015: 4th
Badger Blizzards	Wisconsin	2016	
Chesapeake Rising Tide	Chesapeake (Maryland, Delaware, Washington, D.C., and Virginia)	2014	2014: Runners-up; 2015: 7th
Florida Wave	Florida	2013	2013: Champions; 2014: 5th 2015: 5th
Team GEVA	Garden Empire (New Jersey, most of New York, western Connecticut)	2014	2014: 9th 2015: 11th
Gateway	Gateway (Southern Illinois and eastern Missouri)	2015	2015: 10th
Great Lakes	Great Lakes (Illinois)	2013	2013: Runners-up; 2014: Champions; 2015: Runners-up
Team Pineapple	Hoosier (Indiana)	2014	2013: Runners-up; 2014:4th 2015: Champions
Iowa Icemen	Iowa	2014	2014: 5th 2015: 11th
Team IE	Iroquois Empire (Northeast New York State)	2014	2014: 11th 2015: 6th
Lakeshore	Lakeshore (Michigan)	2015	2015: 9th
Penn Blast	Keystone (Pennsylvania)	2014	2014: 3rd 2015: 3rd
New England Night Riders	New England	2013	2013: 5th 2014: 11th 2015: 13th
Virginia Vibe	Old Dominion (Virginia)	2015	2015: 7th
Norcal Premier	Northern California	2013	2013: 4th 2014: 9th
SoCal Avalanche	Southern California	2014	2014: 8th

Past teams
Team	Region	Founded	Results
Badger Blizzards (Women)	Wisconsin	2013	2013: 7th 2014:5th
Team Evergreen	Evergreen (Eastern Washington, northern Idaho and Montana)	2012	2012: 11th 2013: 13th 2014:13th
Great Plains Tornados (Women)	Great Plains (Nebraska)	2013	2013: 11th
Heart of America (Women)	Heart of America (Kansas, Missouri)	2013	2013: 9th 2014: 5th
Hoosier Exterminators (Women)	Hoosier (Indiana)	2012	2012: Champions; 2013: 6th
Utah Unity (Women)	Intermountain (Utah and Southern Idaho)	2012	2012: 4th
Carolina Flight (Women)	North Carolina	2014	2014: 4th
Ohio Valley	Ohio Valley (Ohio, western Pennsylvania and West Virginia)	2015	2015: 9th (W), 13th (M)
Pioneer Mayhem (Women)	Pioneer (Kentucky)	2013	2013: 3rd
Sound Premier Volleyball Team (Women)	Puget Sound (Western Washington)	2012	2012: 9th 2013: 13th 2014: 10th
Team Western Empire (Men)	Western Empire (Western New York)	2013	2013: 3rd
Team Western Empire (Women)	Western Empire	2012	2012: 9th 2013: 13th 2014: Champions; 2015: Runners-up

== College volleyball ==
Volleyball is a popular NCAA sport, mostly for women. In the 2013-14 school year, 1064 NCAA member schools, 329 of them in the top-level Division I, sponsored women's volleyball at the varsity level, with 16,647 participants across all three divisions. At the same time, 109 schools in all three NCAA divisions combined sponsored varsity men's volleyball, with only 23 of them in Division I; the number of men's varsity volleyball players was roughly one-tenth of women's participation (1,720 to 16,647).

Men's volleyball experienced explosive growth at the Division III level in the 2010s and early 2020s. In the 2010 season (2009–10 school year), only 13 Division III schools competed within the NCAA, although many other D-III members competed outside the NCAA. The next season saw 56 teams play under D-III regulations, leading the NCAA to establish a separate Division III championship in 2012. In that season, 63 teams played D-III men's volleyball, with the number increasing to 113 by the 2022 season.

In 2012, NCAA sanctioned college beach volleyball teams for women for the first time; 14 schools sponsored the sport, with slightly more than 200 participants. The NCAA held its first beach volleyball championship in 2016, by which time nearly 50 schools were sponsoring the sport. In the 2022 season (2021–22 school year), 85 schools were sponsoring the sport.

== High school volleyball ==
High school volleyball is a fall sport for girls and spring sport for boys (except in a few states). Schools typically have a varsity and junior varsity team, and some schools also have freshman teams. Teams play in pre-season and season competition, generally followed by a post-season that includes a regional or sectional championship and often a state championship.

While each state governs its own high school volleyball competitions through their state athletic associations, most follow the lead of the National Federation of State High School Associations (NFHS) for the governance of the sport. Most volleyball rules from state to state are basically the same in the United States. However, because of the individual associations, some minor changes and variations may occur. For example, the Ohio High School Athletic Association (OHSAA) may allow competition to be the best of five while the Kentucky High School Athletic Association (KHSAA) or the West Virginia Secondary School Activities Commission (WVSSAC) may only allow competition to be the best of three. Today, however, most state associations are now using the same guidelines and are also using rally scoring, the best-of-five competition format, and allowing the libero to serve. In addition, most states, if not all, have adopted the plain, white polo shirt for officials as opposed to the black and white striped shirt worn in the past.

== Junior volleyball ==
Junior volleyball is played in the U.S. in many organizations such as churches, the YMCA and the Amateur Athletic Union (AAU), but the largest sponsoring organization is USA Volleyball, which oversees what is commonly referred to as "club volleyball" and hosts a Junior Olympic Championship each year.

In club volleyball, junior players develop their skills and knowledge of the game, usually with the purpose of playing for high school teams. Elite players also prepare for college volleyball. The club season typically lasts from the end of November until July, with the annual Junior Olympic Championships (JOs) taking place in late June, early July. Teams typically play tournaments throughout the season, establishing their ranking in the various regions and preparing for JOs or a season-ending tournament such as the Volleyball Festival, which claims to be the largest annual sporting event in the world.

To qualify for JOs, teams must compete in JO Qualifiers, also referred to as National Qualifiers. There are nine qualifying tournaments across the country, to which teams travel to gain an invitation to JOs. Top teams attend these tournaments to earn their bids, and college coaches will attend to view the year's crop of players.

The club season, long considered a supplemental place for girls and boys to gain experience in preparation for their upcoming high-school seasons, is now an almost necessity to stay competitive in the local high schools. It is also extremely important in the college recruitment process, as most college seasons coincide with state high school seasons, causing the college coaches to miss the entire season. This time is made up during the club season when college coaches are able to travel to various tournaments and meet with club coaches, watch club players, and recruit for their teams.

== Today ==
Volleyball is one of the most popular girls' sports, and strong high school and club programs are found throughout the country. According to a 2022 survey by the National Federation of State High School Associations, volleyball is the second highest sport for female participation at the high school level, trailing outdoor track and field by fewer than 3,000 participants. One of the biggest events in high school-age sports is the annual Volleyball Festival in Phoenix, Arizona, (formerly in Reno, Nevada until 2009 and Sacramento, California until 2004), which draws as many as 10,000 players and 3,000 coaches for its five-day tournament.

Boys' volleyball is popular on a regional basis, and by far the greatest number of boys' teams are in Southern California. However, on the national stage, boys' volleyball remains far less popular than the girls' game at the high school level, as borne out by the following statistics from the aforementioned 2022 NFHS survey:

- For every boy currently competing in high school volleyball, nearly seven girls are involved. This is an improvement from 2012, when this ratio was more than 8:1.
- While all states as well as the District of Columbia sanction girls' volleyball, about half of the states do not sanction the boys' game (25 sanctioned the sport in 2021–22). Sixteen states reported participation of over 10,000 girls in high school volleyball. Of these states, four have no boys' high school volleyball—Texas (#1 in girls' participation), Minnesota (#8), Iowa (#11), and Washington (#15), though Minnesota will begin sanctioning boys' volleyball in 2024–25. Two other high-participation states for girls, Michigan (#4) and Ohio (#6), reported fewer than 500 boys' participants (respectively 337 and 23).
- Even those states that do sanction volleyball for both sexes typically have considerably fewer schools sponsoring the boys' game and thus fewer participants. Of the remaining 12 high-participation girls' volleyball states, only California, with over 45,000 girls and about 25,000 boys, had even half as many boys competing as girls. California has more than a third of all boys' players in the country.

In the four years from 2004 to 2008, high school participation in boys' volleyball rose by more than 15%, from about 42,000 to nearly 50,000. Boys' volleyball has experienced noticeable growth in the 2010s and 2020s, coinciding with the relative boom in NCAA Division III men's volleyball; in 2021–22, roughly 66,500 boys were reported to be playing officially sanctioned high school volleyball. This does not include boys playing at club level in states where high school competition is not officially sanctioned.
