= Kirsten Bernthal Booth =

American volleyball player and coach

Current position
- Record: 502–192 (.723)

Biographical details
- Born: October 16, 1974 (age 52)
- Education: Truman State University(B.A.); University of Iowa

Coaching career (HC unless noted)
- 1997: Iowa (volunteer assistant)
- 1998: Iowa (interim HC; spring season only)
- 2000–2002: Kirkwood Community College
- 2003–2024: Creighton

Head coaching record
- Overall: 614–233 (.725)

Accomplishments and honors

Championships
- 11x Big East – Regular Season (2014–2024); 10x Big East – Tournament (2014–2018, 2020–2024)

Awards
- Volleyball Magazine National Coach of the Year (2016) AVCA West Region Coach of the Year (2024); 4x AVCA East Region Coach of the Year (2015–16, 2018, 2023); 5x Big East Coach of the Year (2015–16, 2019, 2023–24); Missouri Valley Conference Coach of the Year (2012); 2x NJCAA District Coach of the Year (2000–01) Truman State University Athletic Hall of Fame (2011)

Kirsten Bernthal Booth (born October 16, 1974) is an American former volleyball player who was the head coach of the Creighton Bluejays women's volleyball team from 2003 until 2024. She was previously the head volleyball coach at Kirkwood Community College.

Bernthal Booth currently serves as President of Business Operations for LOVB Nebraska, League One Volleyball's Nebraska-based franchise.

== Personal life ==
Kirsten Bernthal Booth was born on October 16, 1974. She is originally from Nebraska, graduating from Lincoln East High School in 1993. She was inducted into Lincoln East's Athletic Hall of Fame.

== Career ==
=== Playing career ===
Bernthal Booth was a setter for Truman State University from 1993 to 1996. She was named the 1993 MIAA National Freshman of the Year while breaking the school record for single-season assists. She graduated as the all-time assists leader. In 1996, she was the MIAA Most Valuable Player and earned AVCA All-region honors. She was the state of Missouri's nominee for the 1997 NCAA Woman of the Year Award. In 2011, she was inducted into Truman State's Athletic Hall of Fame.

== Head coaching record ==
Record table
Season	Team	Overall	Conference	Standing	Postseason
Kirkwood Community College (ICCAC) (2000–2003)
2000	Kirkwood	37–12			NJCAA runner up
2001	Kirkwood	36–18			NJCAA national semifinals
2002	Kirkwood	39–11			
Kirkwood:		112–41 (.732)	– (–)		
Creighton Bluejays (Missouri Valley Conference) (2003–2013)
2003	Creighton	12–18	9–9	T–5th	did not qualify
2004	Creighton	18–11	10–8	5th	did not qualify
2005	Creighton	16–14	10–8	5th	did not qualify
2006	Creighton	21–10	12–6	4th	did not qualify
2007	Creighton	21–10	14–4	T–2nd	did not qualify
2008	Creighton	18–9	15–3	2nd	did not qualify
2009	Creighton	14–17	10–8	T–4th	did not qualify
2010	Creighton	21–12	13–5	3rd	NCAA second round
2011	Creighton	17–14	12–6	4th	did not qualify
2012	Creighton	29–4	17–1	1st	NCAA first round
Creighton Bluejays (Big East) (2013–2024)
2013	Creighton	23–9	12–4	2nd	NCAA second round
2014	Creighton	25–9	16–2	1st	NCAA first round
2015	Creighton	27–9	17–1	1st	NCAA regional semifinal
2016	Creighton	29–7	18–0	1st	NCAA regional final
2017	Creighton	26–7	16–2	1st	NCAA second round
2018	Creighton	29–5	18–0	1st	NCAA second round
2019	Creighton	25–6	17–1	1st	NCAA second round
2020	Creighton	12–4	7–1	1st	NCAA first round
2021	Creighton	31–4	16–2	1st	NCAA second round
2022	Creighton	27–5	17–1	1st	NCAA first round
2023	Creighton	29–5	16–2	1st	NCAA regional semifinal
2024	Creighton	32–3	18–0	1st	NCAA regional final
Creighton:		502–192 (.723)	310–74 (.807)		
Total:		614–233 (.725)			
National champion Postseason invitational champion Conference regular season champion Conference regular season and conference tournament champion Division regular season champion Division regular season and conference tournament champion Conference tournament champion
