= Valadzko =

Valadzko is a Belarusian language surname, the equivalent of Polish Wołodko. Notable people with this surname include:

- Alyaksandr Valadzko (born 1986), Belarusian footballer of Polish descent
- Maksim Valadzko (born 1992), Belarusian footballer
- Siarhei Valadzko (born 1992), Belarusian rower
