= LOVB Nebraska =

American volleyball team

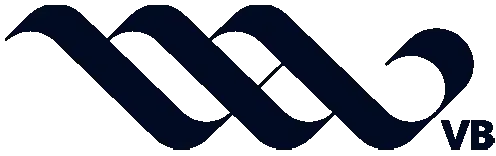
- Founded: 2023
- Ground: Baxter Arena; Omaha, Nebraska, U.S. Heartland Events Center; Grand Island, Nebraska, U.S. Liberty First Credit Union Arena (2025); Ralston, Nebraska, U.S.
- Manager: Suzie Fritz
- League: LOVB Pro
- 2026: DNQ; 5th in LOVB Pro
- Website: www.lovb.com/teams/lovb-nebraska-volleyball
- Championships: None

LOVB Nebraska is an American professional women's indoor volleyball team based in Omaha, Nebraska. Originally known as LOVB Omaha, the team is an inaugural member of LOVB Pro, the professional level of League One Volleyball that began play in January 2025.

== History ==
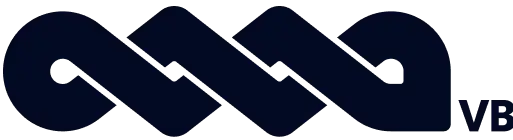
The team's logo as LOVB Omaha

In 2021, LOVB announced plans to start a professional women's volleyball league in the United States. Omaha was announced as LOVB's fifth team location in August 2023. The city also hosts the Omaha Supernovas of the rival Major League Volleyball.

LOVB Omaha played its first season in 2025, with an inaugural roster including Jordan Larson and Justine Wong-Orantes, who played college volleyball for the Nebraska Cornhuskers and were the team's first players signed. Though they finished in 6th place in the 6-team LOVB Pro with a 5-11 record, Omaha would win its quarterfinal and semifinal matches in the 2025 LOVB Finals championship match, where they were swept 3 sets to 0 by LOVB Austin.

In August 2025, LOVB Pro announced that a group headlined by former Nebraska Cornhuskers volleyball star Jordan Larson would purchase the LOVB Omaha franchise, becoming the second LOVB Pro team to have non-league ownership (LOVB Austin became the first that June). Coinciding with the sale, the league announced that LOVB Omaha would rebrand to LOVB Nebraska, a nod to the popularity of volleyball throughout the state. Former Creighton Bluejays coach Kirsten Bernthal Booth was also announced as the team's president of business operations.

== Roster ==
2026 Season Roster
No.	Name	Position	Height	College / Home club	Nationality
1	Lexi Rodriguez	Libero	5 ft 5 in (1.65 m)	Nebraska	United States
2	Emily Thater	Middle blocker	6 ft 3 in (1.91 m)	Missouri	United States
3	Annie Cesar	Libero	5 ft 8 in (1.73 m)		Germany
4	Vicky Savard	Outside hitter	6 ft 1 in (1.85 m)	Montréal	Canada
5	Jaali Winters	Outside hitter	6 ft 3 in (1.91 m)	Creighton	United States
8	Kimberly Drewniok	Opposite hitter	6 ft 2 in (1.88 m)	RC Sorpesee	Germany
9	Iga Wasilewska	Middle blocker	6 ft 0 in (1.83 m)	Legionovia Legionowo	Poland
10	Jordan Larson	Outside hitter	6 ft 2 in (1.88 m)	Nebraska	United States
11	Anne Buijs	Outside hitter	6 ft 3 in (1.91 m)		Netherlands
12	Audriana Fitzmorris	Opposite hitter	6 ft 6 in (1.98 m)	Stanford	United States
13	Gabby Blossom	Setter	5 ft 9 in (1.75 m)	San Diego / Penn State	United States
14	Laura Dijkema	Setter	6 ft 0 in (1.83 m)	Smash	Netherlands
15	Ana Carolina da Silva	Middle blocker	6 ft 0 in (1.83 m)		Brazil
17	Candelaria Herrera	Middle blocker	6 ft 0 in (1.83 m)	Florida A&M / Iowa State	Argentina
19	Alexis Hart	Outside hitter	6 ft 0 in (1.82 m)	Minnesota	United States

As of April 9, 2025.

2025 Season Roster
No.	Name	Position	Height	College / Home club	Nationality
1	Lexi Rodriguez	Libero	5 ft 5 in (1.65 m)	Nebraska	United States
2	Emily Thater	Middle blocker	6 ft 3 in (1.91 m)	Missouri	United States
3	Annie Cesar	Libero	5 ft 8 in (1.73 m)		Germany
4	Justine Wong-Orantes	Libero	5 ft 6 in (1.68 m)	Nebraska	United States
5	Jaali Winters	Outside hitter	6 ft 3 in (1.91 m)	Creighton	United States
7	Vicky Savard	Outside hitter	6 ft 1 in (1.85 m)	Montréal	Canada
8	Kimberly Drewniok	Opposite hitter	6 ft 2 in (1.88 m)	RC Sorpesee	Germany
10	Jordan Larson	Outside hitter	6 ft 2 in (1.88 m)	Nebraska	United States
11	Amber Stivrins	Outside hitter	6 ft 2 in (1.88 m)	Louisville / Georgia / San Diego	United States
12	Audriana Fitzmorris	Opposite hitter	6 ft 6 in (1.98 m)	Stanford	United States
13	Gabby Blossom	Setter	5 ft 9 in (1.75 m)	San Diego / Penn State	United States
14	Laura Dijkema	Setter	6 ft 0 in (1.83 m)	Smash	Netherlands
17	Candelaria Herrera	Middle blocker	6 ft 0 in (1.83 m)	Florida A&M / Iowa State	Argentina
18	Sami Francis	Middle blocker	6 ft 6 in (1.98 m)	Stanford	United States
23	Chiamaka Nwokolo	Middle blocker	6 ft 1 in (1.85 m)	Pittsburgh	United States
26	Lauren Stivrins	Middle blocker	6 ft 4 in (1.93 m)	Nebraska	United States
33	Madi Kubik-Banks	Outside hitter	6 ft 3 in (1.91 m)	Nebraska	United States

== Season standings ==
- 2025: 6th (5–11), Runners-Up (16 points)
- 2026: 5th (10–10), DNQ (30 points)
