= International Volleyball Association =

Co-ed volleyball league in the United States (1975–1980)

- Sport: Volleyball
- First season: 1975
- Folded: 1980
- Commissioner: Wilt Chamberlain
- No. of teams: 14
- Country: United States; Mexico
- Continent: North America

The International Volleyball Association was a short lived co-ed professional volleyball league in the United States from 1975 to 1980. Like other major sports leagues in the United States, it had two geographic divisions. However, its teams were entirely in the west. It is one of the few examples of a professional sports league where men and women competed on the same teams.

In keeping with the "International" name, the league included one team, El Paso-Juarez Sol, which acknowledged both sides of the international twin town in its name.

== Divisions ==
The league started with 5 teams in 1975, but split into two divisions with the addition of the Tucson Turquoise in 1976. The two divisions were Western, which consisted of teams on the Pacific Coast, and a second, called Eastern in 1975 and Continental after 1977, for teams from the Rocky Mountain states.

The only team from the Eastern or Continental Division to win a championship was the Tucson Sky in 1979.

== Teams ==
The teams and the years of existence were:

Team	Years
Santa Barbara Spikers	1975–1979
El Paso-Juarez Sol	1975–1977
Los Angeles Stars	1975–1977
Orange County Stars (Moved from Los Angeles)	1977–1978
San Diego Breakers	1975–1978
Southern California Bangers	1975
Tucson Turquoise (Moved from Southern California)	1976
Tucson Sky (Changed name from Turquoise)	1977–1979
Phoenix Heat	1976–1977
Denver Comets	1976–1977
Seattle Smashers	1978–1979
Albuquerque Lasers	1979
Salt Lake City Stingers	1979
San Jose Diablos	1979

Venues:

- The Diablos played their home games at the San Jose Civic Auditorium.

== Season by year ==
=== 1975 ===
Regular Season

The league consisted of a single division. The top three teams made the playoffs, with the top team receiving a bye in the first round.

Team	Win	Loss	Pct
Los Angeles Stars	18	6	.750
San Diego Breakers	17	7	.708
Santa Barbara Spikers	13	11	.542
Southern California Bangers	6	18	.250
El Paso-Juarez Sol	6	18	.250

Playoffs

Round 1

San Diego	1
Santa Barbara	0

Championship (Best 3 of 5)

Los Angeles	3
San Diego	1

=== 1976 ===
Regular Season

The league was split into two divisions: The Eastern Division and the Western Division. The top five teams made the playoffs. The top team from each division received a bye in first round.

Eastern Division

Team	Win	Loss	Pct
El Paso - Juarez Sol	17	23	.425
Phoenix Heat	14	26	.350
Tucson Turquoise	11	29	.275

Western Division

Team	Win	Loss	Pct
San Diego Breakers	29	11	.725
Los Angeles Stars	25	15	.625
Santa Barbara Spikers	24	16	.600

Playoffs and Championship

Best 3 of 5

Round 1

Santa Barbara	3
Phoenix	0

Round 2

San Diego	3
Santa Barbara	0

Los Angeles	3
El Paso-Juarez	0

Championship

San Diego	3
Los Angeles	1

=== 1977 ===
Regular Season

The league remained divided into two divisions. The Eastern Division from the previous season was renamed the Continental Division. The top two teams from each division played for the division championship, with the winners advancing to play for the league title.

Continental Division

Team	Win	Loss	Pct
Denver Comets	22	14	.612
El Paso - Juarez Sol	21	15	.584
Phoenix Heat	15	21	.417
Tucson Sky	11	25	.306

Western Division

Team	Win	Loss	Pct
Orange County Stars	20	16	.556
Santa Barbara Spikers	19	17	.528
San Diego Breakers	18	18	.500

Playoffs and Championships

Best 3 out of 5

Continental Division

El Paso - Juarez	3
Denver	2

Western Division

Orange County	3
Santa Barbara	2

Championship

Orange County	3
El Paso - Juarez	2

Records

Attendance

The league's total attendance during the 1977 regular season was 227,058, which set a new record for the league. Including both the regular season and the postseason, the league's total attendance was 240,803.

Awards

Most Valuable Male Player: Ed Skorek (El Paso-Juarez Sol)

Most Valuable Female Player: Rosie Wegrich (San Diego Breakers)

Coach of the Year: Dodge Parker (Orange County Stars)

All-IVA First Team

Ed Skorek (El Paso-Juarez Sol)

Rosie Wegrich (San Diego Breakers)

Jon Stanley (Denver Comets)

Stan Gosciniak (Phoenix Heat)

Hilary Johnson (Orange County Stars)

Jon Roberts (Orange County Stars)

All-IVA Second Team

Jose Garcia (Santa Barbara Spikers)

Linda Fernandez (Santa Barbara Spikers)

Bebeto DeFreitas (Santa Barbara Spikers)

Larry Benecke (Denver Comets)

Scott English (Phoenix Heat)

Dodge Parker (Orange County Stars)

Mercedes Gonzalez (Tucson Sky)

=== 1978 ===
Regular Season

The final standings for the season are incomplete. The latest published standings for the league that list the win–loss records for every team read as follows:

Continental Division

Team	Win	Loss	Pct
Tucson Sky	20	13	.606
El Paso-Juarez Sol	15	19	.441
Denver Comets	14	22	.389

West Division

Team	Win	Loss	Pct
Santa Barbara Spikers	26	8	.765
Orange County Stars	20	15	.571
Seattle Smashers	15	19	.441
San Diego Breakers	10	24	.294

Before the playoffs began, the league announced that the Tucson Sky had forfeited their August 19 match against the San Diego Breakers, which had not been played due to the Sky's flight being delayed. After forfeiting the match, Tucson's final record was 21–15, while San Diego's record was 11–25. The Santa Barbara Spikers and Orange County Stars finished the season with the records shown in the table above. The El Paso-Juarez Sol finished with a 16–20 record.

Playoffs and Championship

In the Continental Division playoffs, the Tucson Sky faced the El Paso-Juarez Sol. Tucson won the first match at El Paso on August 31 in three straight sets (12–7, 12–3, 12–5). In the following match, which was played in Tucson on September 4, the Sky won 3-0 (13–11, 12–5, 12–7) to move into the finals.

In the West Division playoffs, the Santa Barbara Spikers played the Orange County Stars. The Stars won the first match, which was played on September 1, 3-1 (12–3, 12–9, 5–12, 15–13). On September 3, Santa Barbara won the second match 3-0 (12–10, 12–4, 12–10). With the series tied 1-1, the teams then played a tiebreaker, which Santa Barbara won 12–6 to advance to the finals.

In the finals, the Sky and Spikers played a close opening match on September 6. The Sky ultimately won 3-2 (12–6, 8–12, 12–10, 3–12, 6–3). Santa Barbara won the second match, which was played the following night, 3-0 (12–8, 12–5, 12–9). The match was immediately followed by a tiebreaker for the league title, which was at one point tied 8–8 before Santa Barbara scored four consecutive points to win 12–8.

The players for Santa Barbara were Reede Reynolds (USA), Luis Eymard (Brazil), Jose Luis Garcia (Mexico), Bebeto de Freitas (Brazil), Larry Milliken, Sue Herrington, Rosie Wegrich and Peter Stefaniuk (Canada).

Records and Statistics

The Tucson Sky's Scott English set four playoff match records for highest average (.700), highest efficiency (.650), most service aces (four), and most service aces in a series (seven). Tucson's Irma Cordero set playoff records for the highest serve receiving average (.962) and with two other players set the record for the highest serve receiving average in a match (1.000). Rosie Wegrich of the Santa Barbara Spikers played in her thirty-third playoff match, setting the new league record.

The Tucson Sky set three playoff match records, including highest average (.588), most service aces (eight), and most service aces in a series (24).

Attendance

Tucson led the league with 2,347 fans per game, while the expansion Seattle Smashers averaged 2,306 fans per game after the All-Star break. The league's total attendance during the regular season (247,661) was nearly ten percent higher than it had been the previous season. Including the postseason, the IVA's total attendance for 1978 was 264,292.

Awards

Most Valuable Male Player: Bebeto DeFreitas (Santa Barbara Spikers)

Most Valuable Female Player: Rosie Wegrich (Santa Barbara Spikers)

Coach of the Year: Byron Shewman (Tucson Sky)

All-IVA First Team

Luiz Eymard (Santa Barbara Spikers)

Bebeto DeFreitas (Santa Barbara Spikers)

Rosie Wegrich (Santa Barbara Spikers)

Garth Pischke (El Paso-Juarez Sol)

Scott English (Tucson Sky)

Irma Cordero (Tucson Sky)

All-IVA Second Team

Ed Skorek (Seattle Smashers)

Linda Fernandez (Seattle Smashers)

Jon Stanley (Denver Comets)

Jon Robert (Orange County Stars)

Dodge Parker (Orange County Stars)

Hilary Johnson (San Diego Breakers)

=== 1979 ===
Regular Season

The league remained divided into two divisions. Similar to the playoff format from the year before, the top two teams in each division played for the division championships, with the winners advancing to the league championship.

Continental Division

Team	Win	Loss	Pct
Denver Comets	29	11	.725
Tucson Sky	23	17	.575
Salt Lake City Stingers	17	23	.425
Albuquerque Lasers	9	31	.225

Western Division

Team	Win	Loss	Pct
Santa Barbara Spikers	27	13	.675
Seattle Smashers	23	17	.575
San Jose Diablos	12	28	.300

Playoffs and Championship

Best 3 out of 5

Continental Division

Tucson	3
Denver	1

Western Division

Santa Barbara	3
Seattle	2

Championship

Tucson	3
Santa Barbara	2

=== 1980 ===
The IVA fell apart during the 1980 season. On June 11, the owners of the San Jose Diablos halted operations. On June 12, William Levy, the owner of the Santa Barbara Spikers, sold the team to Don Moger. Moger planned to move the team to Los Angeles. The league refused to approve the sale, believing that Moger planned to move the Spikers to Los Angeles during the season instead of waiting until 1981. Following the league's decision, Levy chose not to finance the team, which played no games after June 17. Next, the partnership that owned the Albuquerque Lasers announced on June 16 that it did not have enough money to continue running the franchise. Jim Matison and Don Sammis, who owned the Tucson Sky and Salt Lake Stingers, respectively, attempted to come to an agreement to purchase the league and keep it running. However, Sammis withdrew from the deal on July 9, and the league subsequently collapsed.

== Notable players ==
NBA great Wilt Chamberlain played for the Southern California Bangers in 1975, but did not play in 1976. When he became an investor in the IVA and president of the league in 1977, he returned as a player for the Orange County Stars. He played for the Seattle Smashers in 1978 and the Albuquerque Lasers in 1979.

== See also ==
- National Volleyball Association (US)
- Volleyball in the United States
