= Baxter Arena =

Sports arena in Omaha, Nebraska, U.S.

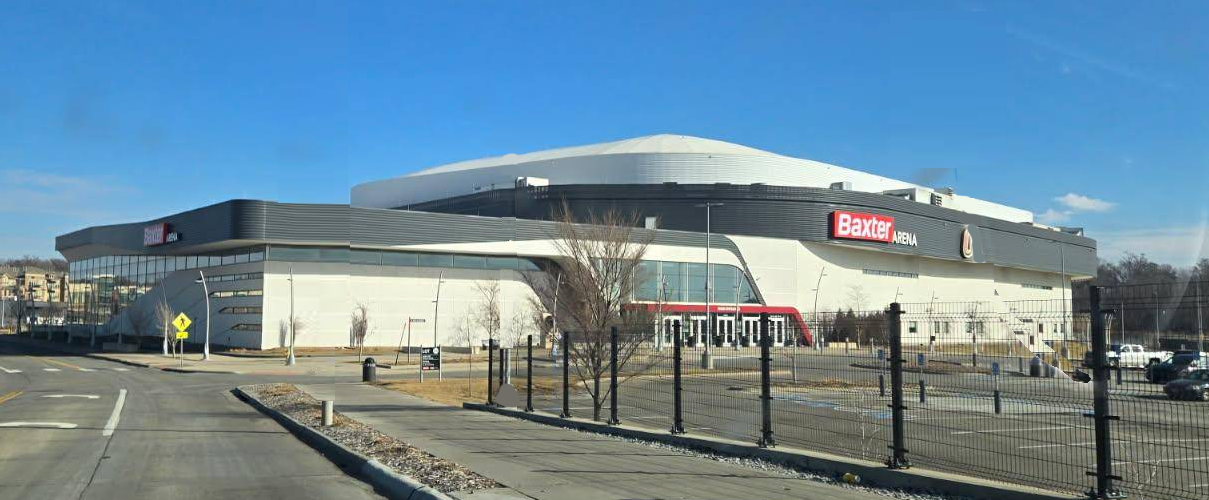
- Baxter Arena in 2026
- Interactive map of Baxter Arena
- Address: 2425 South 67th Street
- Location: Omaha, Nebraska, U.S.
- Coordinates: 41.236°N 96.013°W
- Owner: University of Nebraska Omaha
- Operator: University of Nebraska Omaha
- Capacity: 7,898

Construction
- Groundbreaking: 2014
- Opened: October 23, 2015
- Cost: US$88.1 million
- Architects: HDR, Inc. (lead); Lempka + Edson (secondary)
- General contractor: Kiewit Building Group

Tenants
- Omaha Mavericks (NCAA DI) (2015–present) men: ice hockey and basketball women: basketball and volleyball Omaha Kings FC (MASL2) (2022–present); Omaha Queens FC (MASLW) (2022–present); LOVB Nebraska (LOVB) (2023–present)

Baxter Arena (original working name UNO Community Arena) is a sports arena in Omaha, Nebraska, United States. Owned and operated by the University of Nebraska Omaha, it serves as the home of several of the university's intercollegiate athletic teams, known as the Omaha Mavericks. The arena opened to the public on October 23, 2015, when the hockey team defeated Air Force 4–2.

== History ==
In 2012, Omaha mayor Jim Suttle announced that the Omaha Civic Auditorium, which originally opened in 1954, would close in 2014 due to excessive maintenance costs. The closing of the Auditorium would leave Omaha without a mid-sized indoor venue, and would also have a major impact on the Mavericks ice hockey team. While the team played its home games at the city's main indoor venue, then known as CenturyLink Center Omaha, it regularly practiced at the Auditorium. It was already one of the few NCAA Division I hockey teams without a dedicated practice facility. Additionally, the 14,000-seat CenturyLink Center was increasingly being seen as too large for the hockey program's needs.

The university then began planning for a new arena, selecting a site at the Aksarben Village development, which has become integrated with the UNO campus in recent years. The arena received approval from the University of Nebraska Board of Regents on March 15, 2013. It was originally budgeted at $75 million, but the final cost came in at $81.6 million. Nearly half of the cost was expected to be covered by donations, and UNO announced in June 2015 that it had sold the naming rights to Baxter Auto, a group of auto dealerships in Omaha and the surrounding region, for $400,000 per year over 10 years.

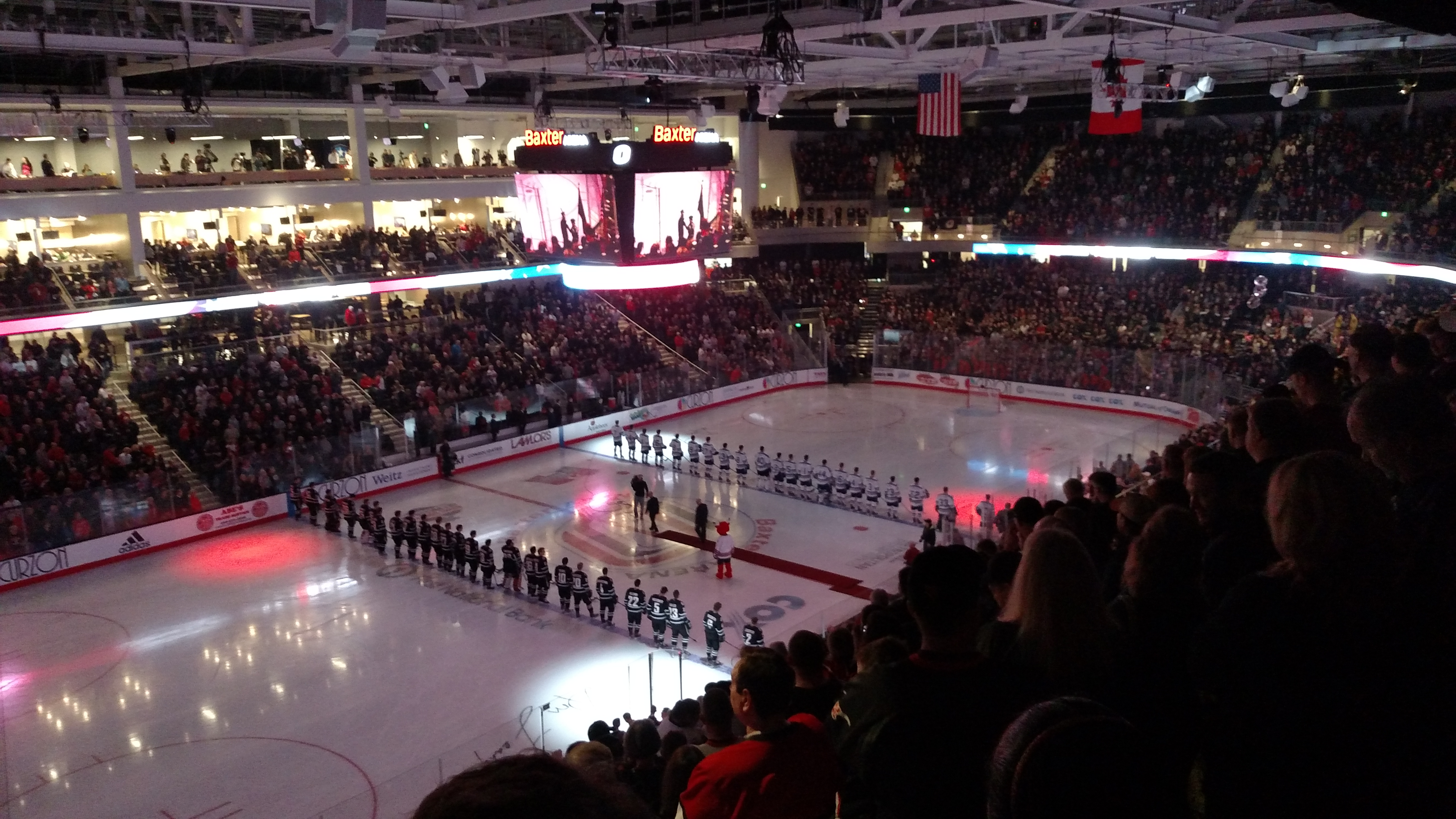
Baxter Arena opening ceremonies, October 2015

The arena was expected to more than cover its required debt service. UNO's financial projections assumed that the arena would host only four non-university events per year. However, the venue is available to lease for events that would have been hosted by the Auditorium before its closure. At least three area school districts, including Omaha Public Schools, moved their high school graduations to the arena by 2016.

The new arena has been the home court for the Omaha men's and women's basketball teams and a secondary home for the women's volleyball team from its opening. The volleyball team played its first game in the arena near the end of the 2015 season on November 1, and also played its final home game of the season there on November 10. Ever since, both basketball teams have played all home games at the arena. President Barack Obama spoke at the arena in 2016 and became the first incumbent president to visit the university.

== Features ==
The arena currently has a fixed-seat capacity of 7,898, with 17 luxury suites, 750 club seats, and a 750-seat student section. It also has two separate ice sheets—one in the main arena for games, and a second that serves as a dedicated practice facility for the Mavericks.

Unlike most venues of this type, the practice rink is the most visible to those entering through the main gate—according to previous Mavericks athletic director Trev Alberts, "This will probably be the first and only arena you’ll see where the focal point of the entire arena is the community ice." UNO has committed to provide at least a third of the venue's ice time for community purposes.

The elevation at street level is approximately 1,030 feet (315 m) above sea level.

== Events ==
The arena held two major curling events in 2017. In August was the U.S. Grand Prix of Curling, a made-for-television competition that is broadcast as Curling Night in America. Three months later in November, the United States Curling Association held the 2017 United States Olympic Curling Trials at the arena.

Baxter Arena is also home to LOVB Nebraska, a professional volleyball team based in Omaha. Matches during their opening season were played at both Liberty First Credit Union Arena and Baxter Arena, with the first game at Baxter Arena being held on Friday, March 21, 2025.

== See also ==
- University of Nebraska Omaha
- List of NCAA Division I basketball arenas
