= Caroline Knop =

American volleyball player (born 1996)

Personal information
- Nationality: American
- Born: January 25, 1996 (age 30)
- Hometown: Pasadena, California
- Height: 5 ft 8 in (1.72 m)
- Weight: 139 lb (63 kg)
- Spike: 111 in (283 cm)
- Block: 109 in (278 cm)
- Education: University of Florida

Volleyball information
- Position: Libero

National team
United States

Caroline E. Knop (born January 25, 1996) is a volleyball player. She plays for the United States women's volleyball team. She participated in the 2018 FIVB Volleyball Women's Nations League.

== Career ==
She played for the University of Michigan and University of Florida.

== Coaching ==
Knop joined Florida's volleyball staff as a volunteer assistant coach, starting in the 2022 season. Prior to Florida, she spent three seasons as an assistant coach at College of Charleston.
