= National Volleyball Association =

Men's volleyball league in the U.S.

- Upcoming season or competition: 2025 NVA season
- Sport: Volleyball
- Founded: 2017; 9 years ago
- First season: 2018
- No. of teams: 12
- Country: United States
- Headquarters: 3100 Airway Ave; Costa Mesa, CA 92626
- Continent: North America
- Most recent champions: Orange County Stunners (2nd title)
- Streaming partner: NVA TV
- Website: nvausa.com

The National Volleyball Association (NVA) is a men's professional indoor volleyball league in the United States. The league comprises 12 teams. The NVA was founded in Costa Mesa, California, in 2017. The league's regular season runs from March to August, with each team playing nine games during the regular season.

NVA's 2020 season was postponed due to COVID-19 pandemic. In 2021, two new teams joined the league, the Chicago Untouchables and the Dallas Tornadoes. In 2022, the Seattle Sasquatch and Colorado Kraken brought the league to a total of 12 teams. Entering the 2023 season, three new teams joined the league including, the Puerto Rico Pythons, Philadelphia Founders, and the San Diego Wild. These teams took the place of the Tornadoes, Kraken, and Sasquatch.

The OC Stunners are the reigning champions, beating the San Diego Wild 3–0 in the 2023 NVA Championship Cup Finals becoming the first team to obtain two National Titles with the NVA.

== Teams ==
National Volleyball Association's 12 teams are divided between the National and American Conferences.

Current NVA team locations (out of frame: Puerto Rico Pythons)

National Volleyball Association teams
Conference	Team	Location	Division	Joined
National Conference	Chicago Untouchables	Chicago, Illinois	Central	2021
National Conference	Los Angeles Blaze	Los Angeles, California	Central	2018
National Conference	Texas Tyrants	Lewisville, Texas	Central	2018
National Conference	Orange County Stunners	Costa Mesa, California	Coastal	2018
National Conference	Team Freedom	Fairfield, New Jersey	Coastal	2018
National Conference	Puerto Rico Pythons	San Juan, Puerto Rico	Coastal	2023
American Conference	San Diego Wild	San Diego, California	Central	2023
American Conference	Philadelphia Founders	Philadelphia, Pennsylvania	Central	2023
American Conference	Utah Stingers	Salt Lake City, Utah	Central	2018
American Conference	Las Vegas Ramblers	Las Vegas, Nevada	Coastal	2018
American Conference	Ontario Matadors	Rancho Cucamonga, California	Coastal	2018
American Conference	Southern Exposure	Gainesville, Florida	Coastal	2018

== Season structure ==
The regular season starts in March and goes through to August. Each team plays ten games at different exhibition locations. A team faces each of its opponents in its division two times a year (four games). Each team plays the three teams from the other division in their conference (American or National Conference) and then another three teams from one division in the opposing conference (six games). This asymmetrical structure means the strength of schedule will vary between teams. Over the seasons, each team will have played seven games against their conference and three from their opposing conference.

The NVA Cup Championship playoffs begin in August after the regular season with the top four teams in each conference, regardless of divisional alignment. Seeds are awarded in strict order of the regular-season record (with the FIVB point system to decide tiebreakers as needed). The playoffs follow a single-elimination tournament format. Losers from the semi-final matches are eliminated from the championship match but play in the bronze medal match. The winner of the NVA Finals receives the NVA Cup Trophy. In addition, the league awards the Most Valuable Player Award to the best-performing player of the championship event and seven awards for the best-performing player of each position during the regular season.

== Champions ==
National Volleyball Association champions
Year	Champion	Runner–up	Third place
2018	Team Pineapple	Arizona Sizzle	Icemen
2019	Team LVC	Team Pineapple	Orange County Stunners
2020	Utah Stingers	Orange County Stunners	Las Vegas Ramblers
2021	Orange County Stunners	Las Vegas Ramblers	Utah Stingers
2022	Las Vegas Ramblers	Orange County Stunners	Texas Tyrants
2023	Orange County Stunners	San Diego Wild	Texas Tyrants

== See also ==
- Athletes Unlimited Volleyball (AUV)
- International Volleyball Association
- Volleyball in the United States
