= Laura Dijkema =

Dutch volleyball player

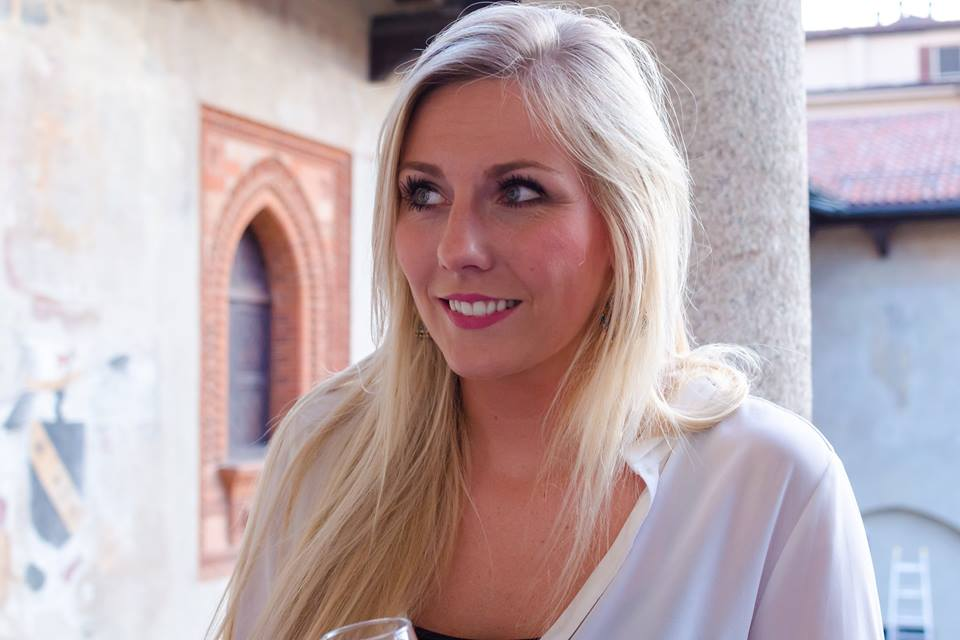
- Dijkema, 2016

Personal information
- Full name: Laura Chantal Dijkema
- Nationality: Dutch
- Born: 18 February 1990 (age 36); Beilen, Netherlands
- Hometown: Amsterdam
- Height: 1.84 m (6 ft 0 in)
- Weight: 70 kg (154 lb)
- Spike: 297 cm (117 in)
- Block: 279 cm (110 in)

Volleyball information
- Position: Setter
- Current club: LOVB Omaha
- Number: 14

Career
Years	Teams
2006–2007; 2007–2008; 2008–2011; 2011–2012; 2012–2013; 2013–2014; 2014–2016; 2016–2017; 2018–2020; 2020–2021; 2021–2022; 2022–2023; 2023–2024; 2025–2026	TFM/DOK; SCU Emlichheim; Martinus/TVC Amstelveen; VfB Suhl; USC Münster; Halkbank Ankara; Dresdner SC; Igor Gorgonzola Novara; Il Bisonte Firenze; Lokomotiv Kaliningrad; Leningradka Saint-Petersburg; Helvia Recina Volley Macerata; Megabox Volley Vallefoglia; LOVB Nebraska

National team
2010–	Netherlands
Honours
Women's volleyball
Representing the Netherlands
World Grand Prix
Bronze medal – third place	2016 Bangkok
European Championship
Silver medal – second place	2015 Belgium / Netherlands
Silver medal – second place	2017 Azerbaijan/Georgia
Bronze medal – third place	2023 Belgium/Estonia/Germany/Italy

Laura Chantal Dijkema (born 18 February 1990) is a Dutch volleyball player, who plays as a setter. She is a member of the Netherlands women's national team.

== Career ==
Dijkema began playing volleyball in 1997 at the age of 7, at the club Smash in her hometown of Beilen. In 2006 as a 16-year-old she went to play at DOK from Dwingeloo, then in the highest league in the Netherlands. In 2010, Dijkema, then at Halkbank from Turkey, got her first chance at the Dutch national team at the Montreux Volley Masters. From 2011 to 2016 Dijkema played for several clubs in Germany. For the season 2016-17 she has signed a contract with Novara from Italy.

== Awards ==
=== Clubs ===
==== National championships ====
- 2008/2009 Dutch Cup, with Martinus Amstelveen
- 2008/2009 Dutch Championship, with Martinus Amstelveen
- 2009/2010 Dutch SuperCup 2009, with TVC Amstelveen
- 2009/2010 Dutch Cup, with Martinus Amstelveen
- 2009/2010 Dutch Championship, with TVC Amstelveen
- 2010/2011 Dutch SuperCup 2010, with TVC Amstelveen
- 2010/2011 Dutch Championship, with TVC Amstelveen
- 2014/2015 German Championship, with Dresdner SC
- 2015/2016 German Cup, with Dresdner SC
- 2015/2016 German Championship, with Dresdner SC
- 2016/2017 Italian Championship, with Igor Gorgonzola Novara
- 2020/2021 Russian Championship (with Lokomotiv Kaliningrad)

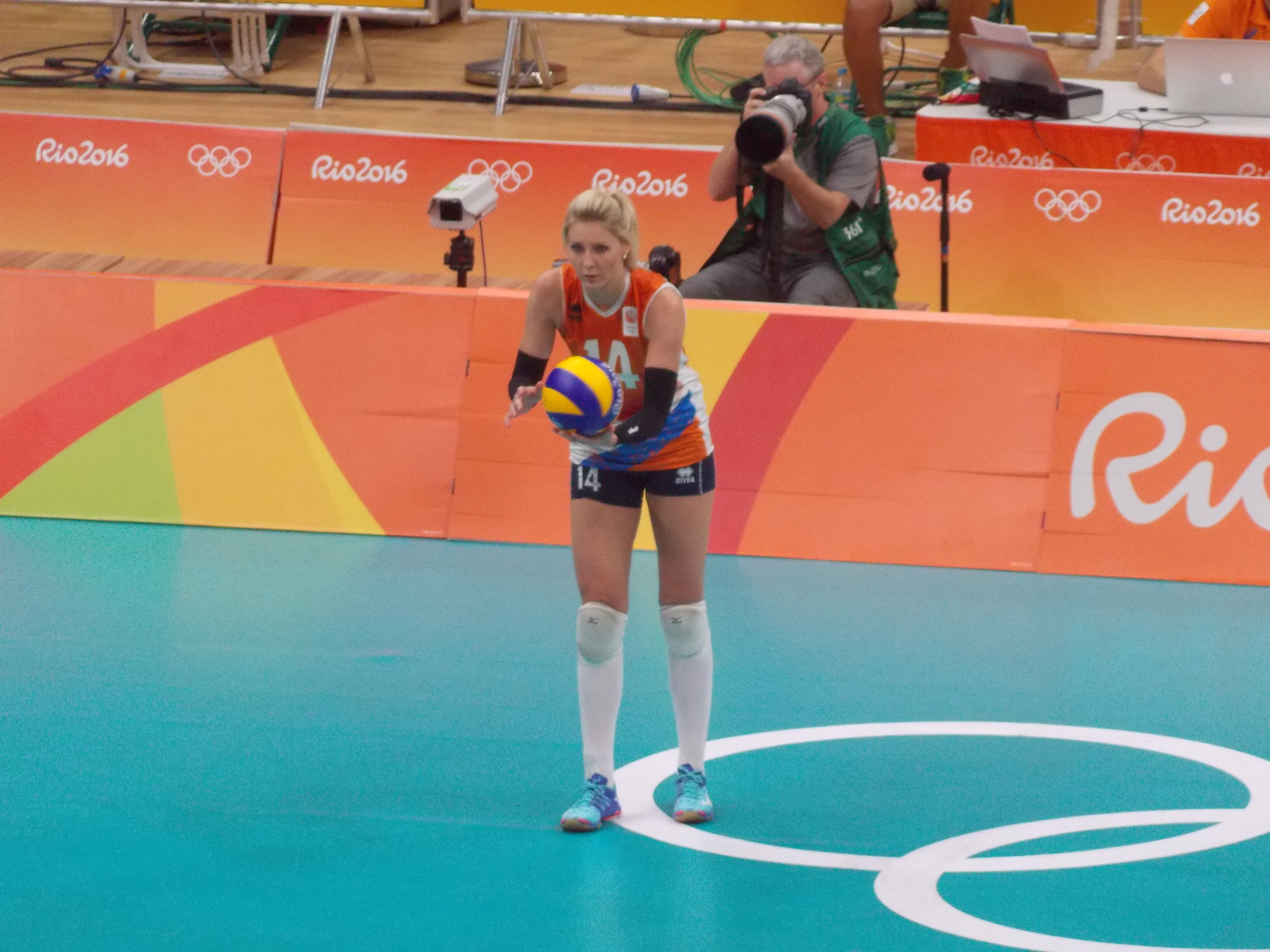
Dijkema at the 2016 Summer Olympics.

=== National team ===
==== Senior team ====
- 2015 Montreux Volley Masters
- 2015 CEV European Championship
- 2016 FIVB World Grand Prix

=== Individuals ===
- 2017 European Championship "Best Setter"

Awards
Preceded by (Serbia) Maja Ognjenović	Best Setter of European Championship; 2017	Succeeded by (Serbia) Maja Ognjenović
