= LOVB Pro =

American women's volleyball league

LOVB
- Current season, competition or edition: 2026 LOVB Pro season
- Sport: Volleyball
- Founded: October 19, 2021; 5 years ago
- First season: 2025
- Owner: League One Volleyball
- Commissioner: Sandra Idehen
- No. of teams: 6 (expanding to 10 teams for 2027)
- Country: United States
- Headquarters: Los Angeles, California, United States
- Most recent champion: LOVB Austin
- Most titles: LOVB Austin (2 titles)
- Broadcasters: USA Network; ESPN
- Streaming partners: ESPN; Victory+
- Website: LOVB.com

LOVB Pro (pronounced "love" and commonly referred to as League One Volleyball) is a women's professional indoor volleyball league in the United States. The league is owned by League One Volleyball (LOVB), a volleyball body founded in 2020. The league held its first season in 2025.

== History ==
League One Volleyball (LOVB) was founded in 2020 by Katlyn Gao, Peter Hirschmann, and Olympian Kevin Wong as a network of youth volleyball clubs across the United States with the intent of eventually creating and sustaining a professional league. As of July 2025, LOVB's youth business includes 77 club locations in 28 states, with over 22,000 youth athletes and 3,500+ coaches. These clubs provide volleyball coaching and preparation for team competition for youth ages 12-18 interested in playing travel volleyball.

On October 19, 2021, LOVB formally announced the creation of its professional league, branded as LOVB Pro.

On March 9, 2023, LOVB announced its first professional cities as Atlanta, Georgia, and Houston, Texas. Upon announcement, each team also announced their first player or players (all of whom have won Olympic medals), dubbed their "founding athletes"; Atlanta announced Fabiana Claudino and Kelsey Robinson-Cook, and Houston announced Micha Hancock and Jordan Thompson. On April 27, a team was added in Madison, Wisconsin, with founding athlete Lauren Carlini. On June 5, the fourth city was announced as Salt Lake City, Utah, led by founding athletes Jordyn Poulter and Haleigh Washington. On August 16, Omaha, Nebraska was announced as the fifth host city with founding athletes Jordan Larson and Justine Wong-Orantes. In December, the league announced it would be building a dedicated training facility for LOVB Madison and area LOVB youth squads in the Madison suburb of Sun Prairie. A week later, the league announced its final city as Austin, Texas, with founding athlete Carli Lloyd.

=== 2025 Inaugural season ===
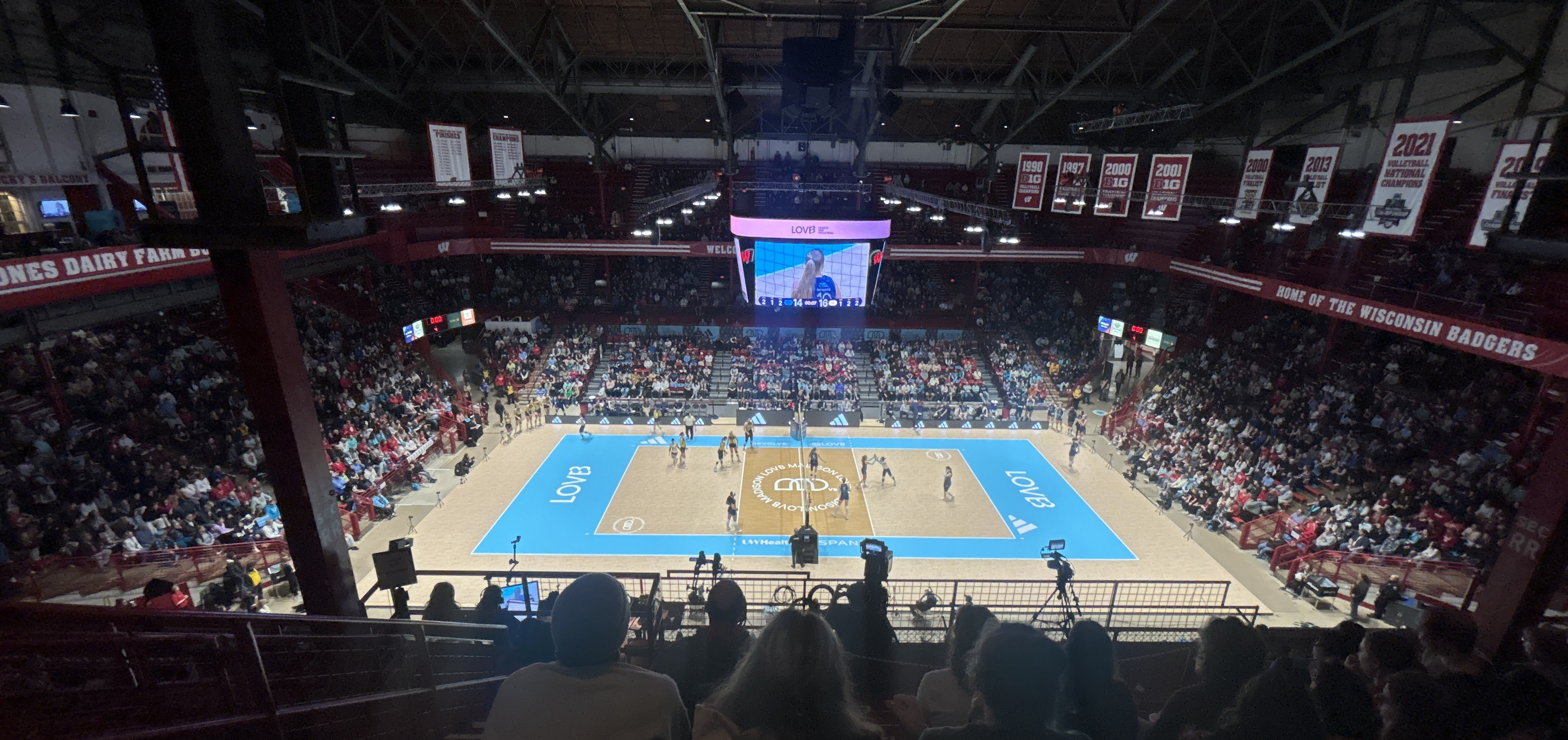
LOVB Madison's inaugural match against LOVB Salt Lake (January 17, 2025 at the Wisconsin Field House)

Team venues and schedules for LOVB Pro's inaugural 2025 season were announced on July 18, 2024, with each team playing 16 matches. The season featured four matches per week, a single head-to-head match and a homestand-style "Weekend with LOVB" where one team would host two others for three total matches. An in-season tournament, the LOVB Classic, would be held alongside the Triple Crown NIT youth invitational in February in Kansas City, Missouri. The LOVB Finals, a single-elimination tournament involving all 6 teams, would be held in April in Louisville, Kentucky, with LOVB Austin claiming the crown.

=== 2026 season ===
LOVB's 2026 season featured the same 6 teams as in 2025, with LOVB Omaha rebranding as LOVB Nebraska. The season, which increased from 16 matches per team to 20, eschewed the "Weekend with LOVB" format and saw a revamp the LOVB Classic into a 3-match, non-tournament format with all 6 teams playing one match that counted in the season standings. The postseason was also revamped to include only the top-4 finishers in the single-table standings playing semifinal and championship rounds that were 2-match formats (with a first-to-15-point mini-match played if the first two matches were split). The semifinals were played in Louisville and the Championship round in Long Beach, California, where LOVB Austin defeated LOVB Salt Lake.

=== Future plans ===
In the fourth quarter of 2025, LOVB announced its first expansion teams, located in Los Angeles, Minnesota, and San Francisco, would take to the court in 2027. A fourth expansion team for 2027, LOVB Miami, was announced in May 2026, which will give the league 10 teams for 2027, split into two conferences — Atlanta, Madison, Miami, Minnesota, and Nebraska will comprise an Eastern Conference; Austin, Houston, Los Angeles, Salt Lake, and San Francisco will play in the Western Conference.

== Teams ==
Eastern Conference:
- 1 LOVB Atlanta
- 2 LOVB Madison
- 3 LOVB Miami
- 4 LOVB Minnesota
- 5 LOVB Nebraska
Western Conference:
- 6 LOVB Austin
- 7 LOVB Houston
- 8 Los Angeles Orbit
- 9 LOVB Salt Lake
- 10 San Francisco Signal

Eight of LOVB Pro's ten teams do not have traditional city-nickname team identities, only being referred to as "LOVB" followed by the city, state, or region they represent. Expansion teams in San Francisco and Los Angeles would be the first league teams to adopt traditional nicknames, revealing their names as the San Francisco Signal and Los Angeles Orbit, respectively. At least two other teams, LOVB Houston and LOVB Nebraska, have been entertaining fan input on a more-traditional team identity.

=== Current teams ===
Eastern Conference
Team	Location	Venue	Capacity	Joined
LOVB Atlanta	Atlanta, Georgia	Gateway Center Arena	3,500	2025
LOVB Madison	Madison, Wisconsin	Alliant Energy Center	7,432	2025
LOVB Miami	Miami, Florida	Watsco Center	7,972	2027
LOVB Minnesota	Minneapolis, Minnesota	Maturi Pavilion	5,700	2027
LOVB Nebraska	Omaha, Nebraska	Baxter Arena; BigIron Events Center; Bob Devaney Sports Center	7.898; 6,000; 8,309	2025
Western Conference
LOVB Austin	Austin, Texas	H-E-B Center; Frost Bank Center	8,700; 18,418	2025
LOVB Houston	Houston, Texas	Berry Center	9,500	2025
Los Angeles Orbit	Los Angeles, California	Intuit Dome	18,300	2027
LOVB Salt Lake	Salt Lake City, Utah	Lifetime Activities Center; BYU Smith Fieldhouse	5,000; 5,000	2025
San Francisco Signal	San Francisco, California	Bill Graham Civic Auditorium	8,500	2027

== League sponsorship, funding, and ownership ==
On September 28, 2022, LOVB raised $16.75 million in a Series A funding round, headlined by Billie Jean King and Kevin Durant. A year later, LOVB raised $35 million in a Series B round that included investments from Lindsey Vonn, Jayson Tatum, and Candace Parker.

On June 17, 2024, LOVB and Adidas signed an apparel partnership that would make Adidas the uniform supplier of LOVB Pro. Two days later, LOVB announced a partnership with Spanx, the apparel brand's first sports partnership, to provide apparel and support league initiatives for LOVB's youth and professional circuits.

LOVB Pro owned and operated each of the six franchises that played its inaugural 2025 season. In June 2025, LOVB announced its first sale of a franchise, with a group headed by David Blitzer, Peter Holt (investing through his San Antonio-based Spurs Sports & Entertainment), and Amy Griffin purchasing the LOVB Austin franchise as well as acquiring an equity stake in the league. In August 2025, it was announced that LOVB Omaha would be acquired by a group headlined by former Nebraska Cornhuskers volleyball star Jordan Larson; it coincided with a team rebrand to LOVB Nebraska.

== Broadcasting ==
On May 9, 2024, LOVB and ESPN announced an international media rights agreement that would see 10 matches broadcast on ESPN networks and an additional 18 streamed on ESPN+ in the United States for the 2025 season. Alongside ESPN, Women's Sports Network, a free ad-supported streaming television (FAST) network, would air 16 matches, most of which were Saturday doubleheaders. Another streaming service, DAZN, also aired 16 matches both in the U.S. and globally.

Outside the U.S., 28 LOVB matches in 2025 aired on ESPN networks in Brazil, Canada, the Caribbean, Mexico, Dominican Republic, Central America, Spanish-speaking South America, Australia, New Zealand and the Pacific Islands. SPOTV also aired all 60 LOVB matches to audiences in Southeast Asia.

For the 2026 season, ESPN returned as a broadcaster for 28 matches. In addition, LOVB reached an agreement with USA Network to broadcast Wednesday night matches, the LOVB Playoffs and the LOVB Championships. The remaining matches 22 matches will stream on FAST network Victory+.

== See also ==
- Volleyball in the United States
- National Volleyball Association
- Athletes Unlimited Volleyball
- Pro Volleyball Federation
- Major League Volleyball (2026)
- Major League Volleyball (1987)
