= United States national volleyball team =

United States national volleyball team may refer to:

- United States men's national volleyball team
- United States women's national volleyball team
