= Weronika Wołodko =

Polish volleyball player (born 1998)

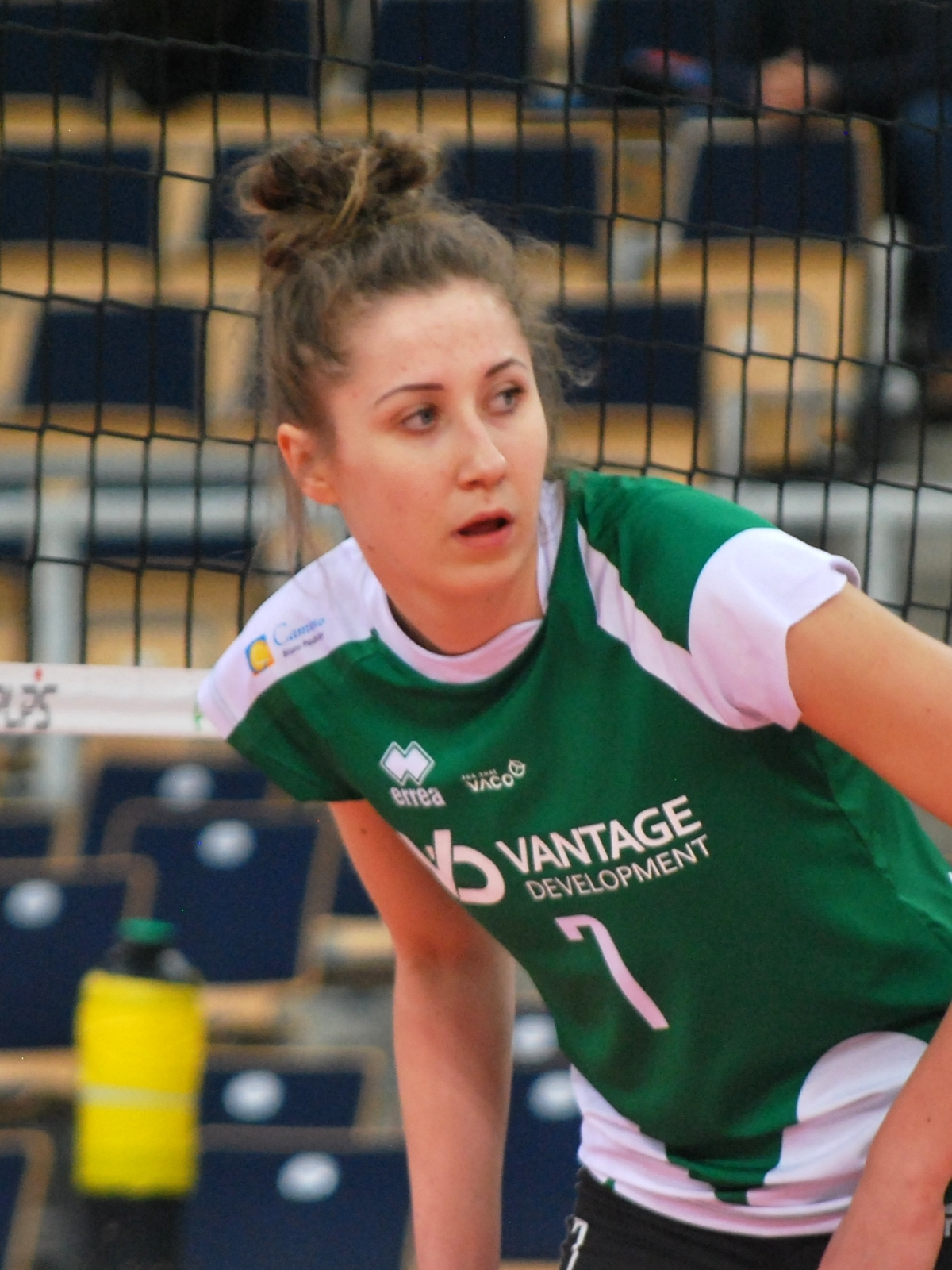

Personal information
- Nationality: Polish
- Born: 8 October 1998 (age 28) Elbląg
- Height: 180 cm (71 in)
- Weight: 66 kg (146 lb)
- Spike: 297 cm (117 in)
- Block: 280 cm (110 in)

Volleyball information
- Position: Setter
- Current club: Budowlani Łódź
- Number: 23 (national team)

Career
- Years: Team
- 2015: Budowlani Łódź

National team
- Years: Team
- 2008-: Poland

Weronika Wołodko (born 9 October 1998 in Elbląg) is a Polish women's volleyball player, playing as a Setter.

Since the 2017–2018 season, she has been a player at Impel Wrocław. In 2017, she was named to the Poland women's national volleyball team; She participated at the 2018 FIVB Volleyball Women's Nations League.
