= Sarah Wilhite Parsons =

American volleyball player

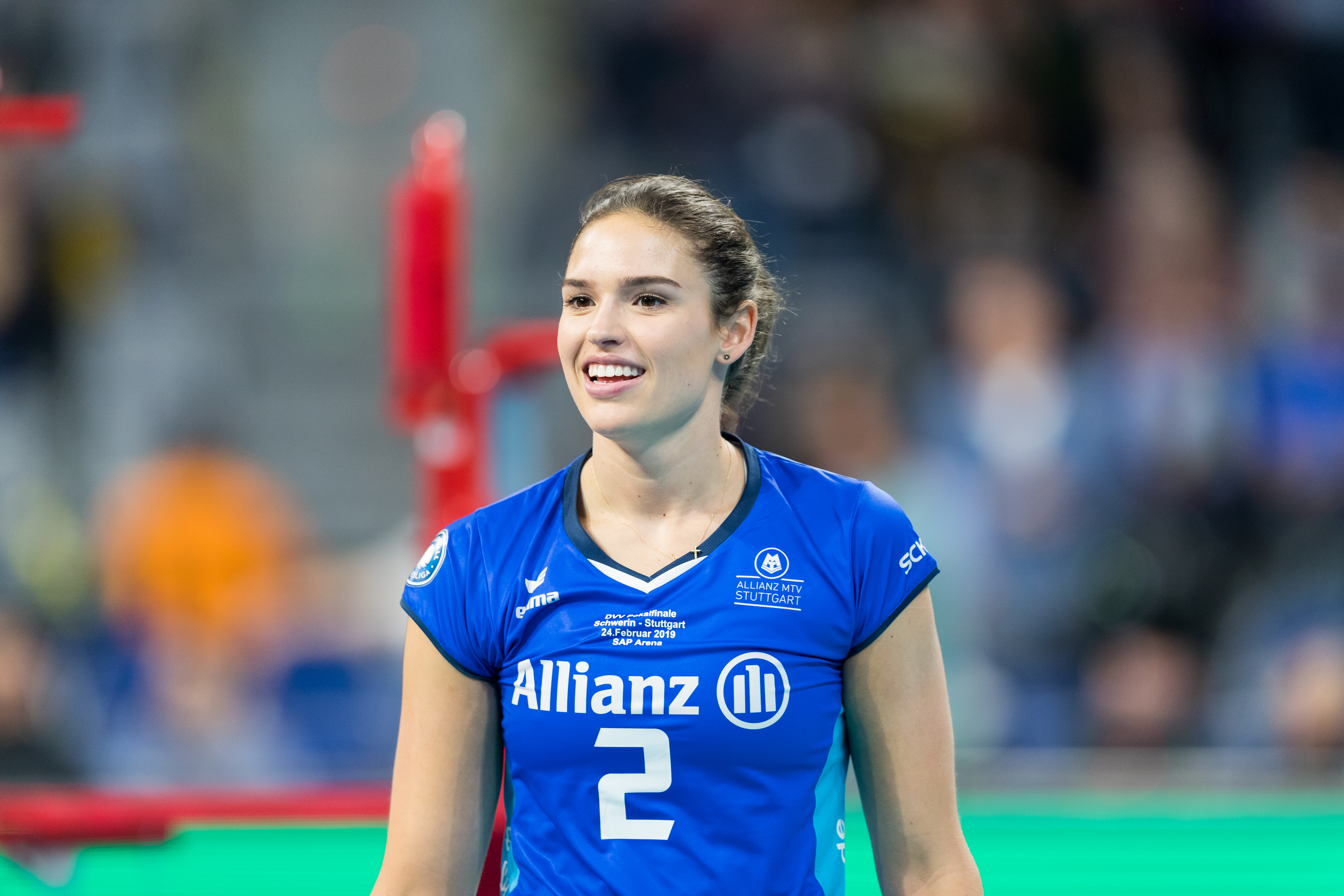
- Wilhite Parsons in 2019

Personal information
- Nationality: American
- Born: July 30, 1995 (age 31)
- Hometown: Eden Prairie, Minnesota, U.S.
- Height: 188 cm (6 ft 2 in)
- Weight: 75 kg (165 lb)
- Spike: 305 cm (120 in)
- Block: 300 cm (118 in)
- Education: University of Minnesota

Volleyball information
- Position: Outside hitter
- Current club: Omaha Supernovas
- Number: 11 (club); 13 (national team)

Career
Years	Teams
2013–2016	(United States) Minnesota
2017–2018	(Italy) Busto
2018–2019	(Germany) Allianz MTV Stuttgart
2019–2020	(Brazil) Sesi Vôlei Bauru
2020–2022	(Japan) NEC Red Rockets
2026	(United States) Omaha Supernovas

National team
2017–	United States
Medal record
Women's volleyball
Representing United States
Pan-American Cup
Gold medal – first place	2017 Lima/Cañete	Team
Gold medal – first place	2018 Santo Domingo	Team
Bronze medal – third place	2023 Ponce	Team
Pan American Cup Final Six
Gold medal – first place	2023 Santo Domingo
NORCECA Champions Cup
Gold medal – first place	2019 Colorado Springs	Team

Sarah Grace Wilhite Parsons (born July 30, 1995) is an American professional volleyball player who plays as an outside hitter for Japan professional club NEC Red Rockets and the United States women's national volleyball team.

== Personal life ==
Wilhite Parsons is from Eden Prairie, Minnesota and attended Eden Prairie High School. She was the Minnesota Gatorade Player of the Year in 2011 and 2012 and was the number 14 nationally ranked recruit coming out of high school.

She is married to Jameson Parsons.

== Career ==
=== College ===
Wilhite Parsons played college volleyball for Minnesota. In her sophomore season in 2014, she was 2nd on the team in kills with 309 kills. During her junior season in 2015, she trained with the US Collegiate National Team. During that year, she helped Minnesota to its first NCAA Final Four appearance since 2009 in 2015.

Head coach Hugh McCutcheon stated that it was her junior season when he saw real potential in her to become the team leader as a six-rotation outside hitter. With having won no major awards her entire career, she had a breakout season during her final season in 2016. She worked on her all-around volleyball skills and ended up averaging 4.20 kills per set and helped Minnesota to its second straight NCAA Final Four appearance in 2016. Her season performance garnered her multiple awards such as the AVCA and ESPNW National Player of the Year, becoming the first player in Minnesota's history to receive the award. She was also named the Big Ten Player of the Year. She was named Minnesota's Female Athlete of the Year and Breakthrough Athlete of the Year in 2017. She finished her career with 1,182 kills.

=== National team ===
Wilhite Parsons has participated in several tournaments with the U.S. national team including the 2017 Pan-American Cup, 2017 FIVB World Grand Prix, 2018 Pan-American Cup, 2018 FIVB World Championship, and preliminary rounds during the FIVB Nations League in 2018, 2019, 2021, and 2022.

She was named an alternate for the 2020 Olympic Games, but did not travel with the team to Tokyo.

=== Professional clubs ===
- (Italy) Busto (2017–2018)
- (Germany) Allianz MTV Stuttgart (2018–2019)
- (Brazil) Sesi Vôlei Bauru (2019–2020)
- (Japan) NEC Red Rockets (2020–2022)
- (United States) Omaha Supernovas (2026–)

== Awards and honors ==
=== Clubs ===
- 2022–2023 Final Stage Champion, with NEC Red Rockets
- 2021–2022 Empress' Cup All Japan Volleyball Championship – Gold Medal, with NEC Red Rockets
- 2021–2022 Kurowashiki Tournament – Bronze Medal, with NEC Red Rockets
- 2019–2020 Brazilian Cup – Bronze Medal, with Sesi Vôlei Bauru
- 2019–2020 Paulista Championship – Bronze Medal, with Sesi Vôlei Bauru
- 2018–2019 German Bundesliga – Gold Medal, with Allianz MTV Stuttgart
- 2018–2019 German Cup – Silver Medal, with Allianz MTV Stuttgart
- 2017–2018 Italian Cup – Bronze Medal, with Busto

=== College ===
- AVCA First Team All-American (2016)
- ESPNW National Player of the Year (2016)
- Big Ten Player of the Year (2016)

=== International ===
- 2019 NORCECA Champions Cup – Most Valuable Player
