= Paige Sander =

American volleyball player (born 1995)

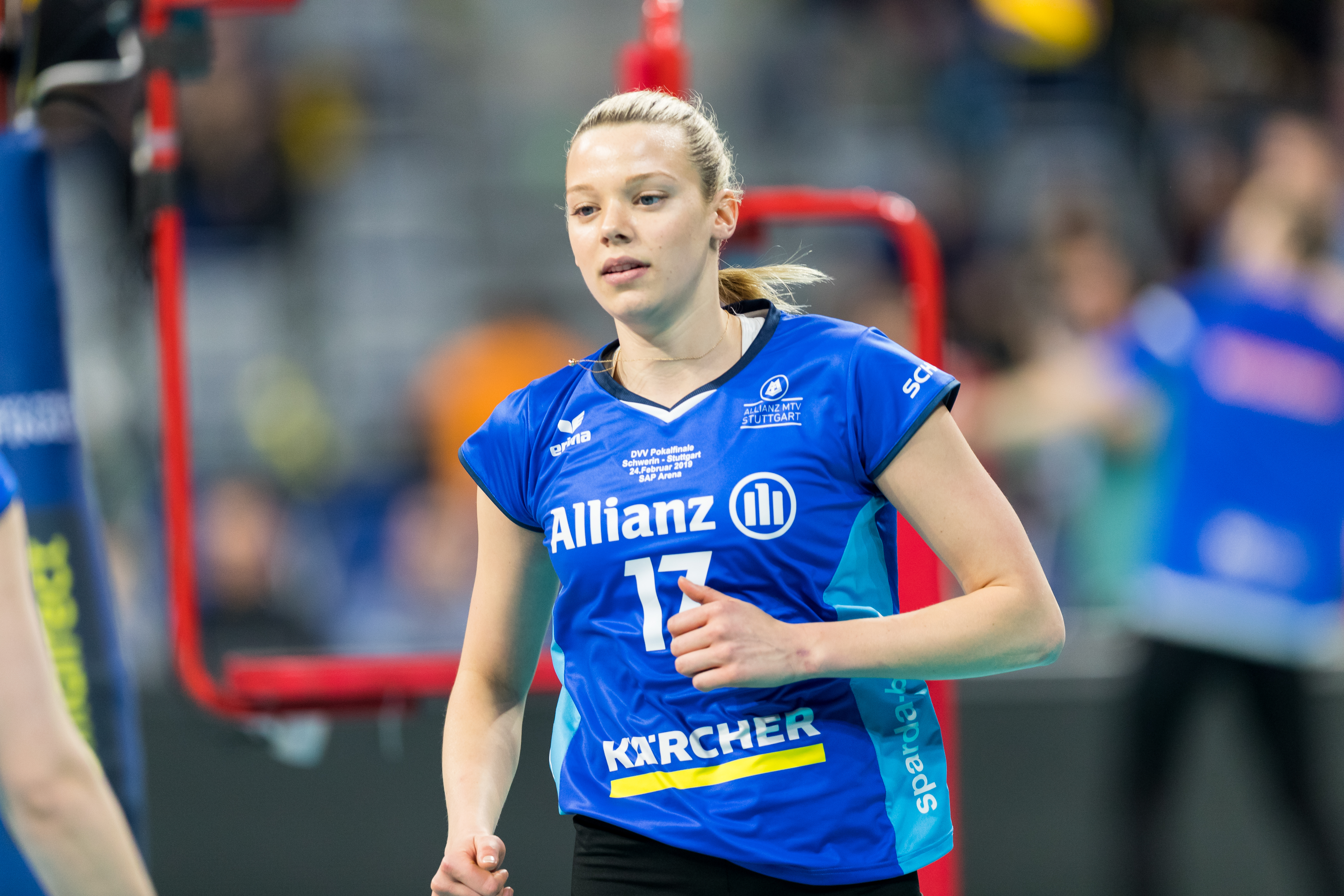
- Sander in 2019

Personal information
- Full name: Paige Nicole Sander
- Nationality: American
- Born: June 21, 1995 (age 31)
- Hometown: Stewartville, Minnesota, U.S.
- Height: 187 cm (6 ft 2 in)
- Weight: 67 kg (148 lb)
- Spike: 312 cm (123 in)
- Block: 300 cm (118 in)
- Education: Minnesota

Volleyball information
- Position: Middle Blocker

Career
Years	Teams
2013–2016	(United States) Minnesota
2016–2017	(Puerto Rico) Valencianas de Juncos
2017–2019	(Germany) Allianz MTV Stuttgart

National team
2017–2019	United States
Medal record
Indoor Volleyball
Representing the United States
Pan-American Cup
Gold medal – first place	2017 Lima/Cañete
Gold medal – first place	2018 Santo Domingo

Paige Nicole Sander (née Tapp; born June 21, 1995) is an American former volleyball player who played in the middle blocker position.

Sander played collegiately for Minnesota from 2013 to 2016 where she was an All-American and was a member of the U.S. national team. With the national team, she won a gold medal at the 2017 and 2018 Pan American Cup, and participated in the 2017 FIVB World Grand Prix tournament.

== Personal life ==
Sander is from Stewartville, Minnesota and played volleyball for Stewartville High School.

Sander's twin sister, Hannah, also played volleyball with her at Minnesota and the national team. In 2022, she married former men's national team player Brenden Sander.

== Career ==
=== Minnesota ===
At Minnesota, Sander began her career in 2013, but seldom played her freshman season, only seeing action in 21 sets. The following season in 2014, Sander was named a Third Team All-American. She played in 110 of 111 possible sets and started in all 31 matches, averaging 1.55 blocks per set and had 171 total blocks. Her season average for blocks and blocks per set ranked second in school history in a single season. She was the nation's third-best blocker and led the Big Ten in blocks per set. She also played with the United States Collegiate Team under former Minnesota Gopher coach Mike Hebert.

In 2015, she again played for team USA Volleyball's Collegiate National Team that competed at the World University Games in South Korea. For Minnesota, she started all 35 matches and played in all 129 sets. By season's end, she was second on team in blocks and third in kills and points. Minnesota reached the 2015 NCAA final four and she had 13 kills in the match, but Minnesota would lose to Texas.

During her senior season in 2016, Minnesota advanced to its second straight NCAA final four, after she contributed 7 kills in the elite eight win vs. UCLA. In the final four, she had seven kills and five blocks in the final four semi-final loss versus eventual national champion Stanford. After concluding her senior season, she became the first-ever University of Minnesota player in any sport to win the Senior CLASS Award. She finished her career at Minnesota with 783 kills, 249 digs, and 495 blocks.

=== U.S. national team ===
After college, she joined the U.S. senior national team. With the team, she won a gold medal at the 2017 and 2018 Pan American Cup, and participated in the 2017 FIVB World Grand Prix tournament, placing 5th at the tournament.

=== Professional clubs ===
Sander played professional volleyball in Puerto Rico (2016–2017) and Germany (2017–2019).

- 2018–2019 German Bundesliga – Gold Medal, with Allianz MTV Stuttgart
- 2018–2019 German Cup – Silver Medal, with Allianz MTV Stuttgart
- 2017–2018 CEV Cup – Bronze Medal, with Allianz MTV Stuttgart
- 2017–2018 German Bundesliga – Silver Medal, with Allianz MTV Stuttgart
- 2017–2018 German Cup – Bronze Medal, with Allianz MTV Stuttgart
- 2017–2018 German Super Cup – Silver Medal, with Allianz MTV Stuttgart
- 2016–2017 Puerto Rican League Championship – Silver Medal, with Valencianas de Juncos
