= Aleksandra Jegdić =

Serbian volleyball player (born 1994)

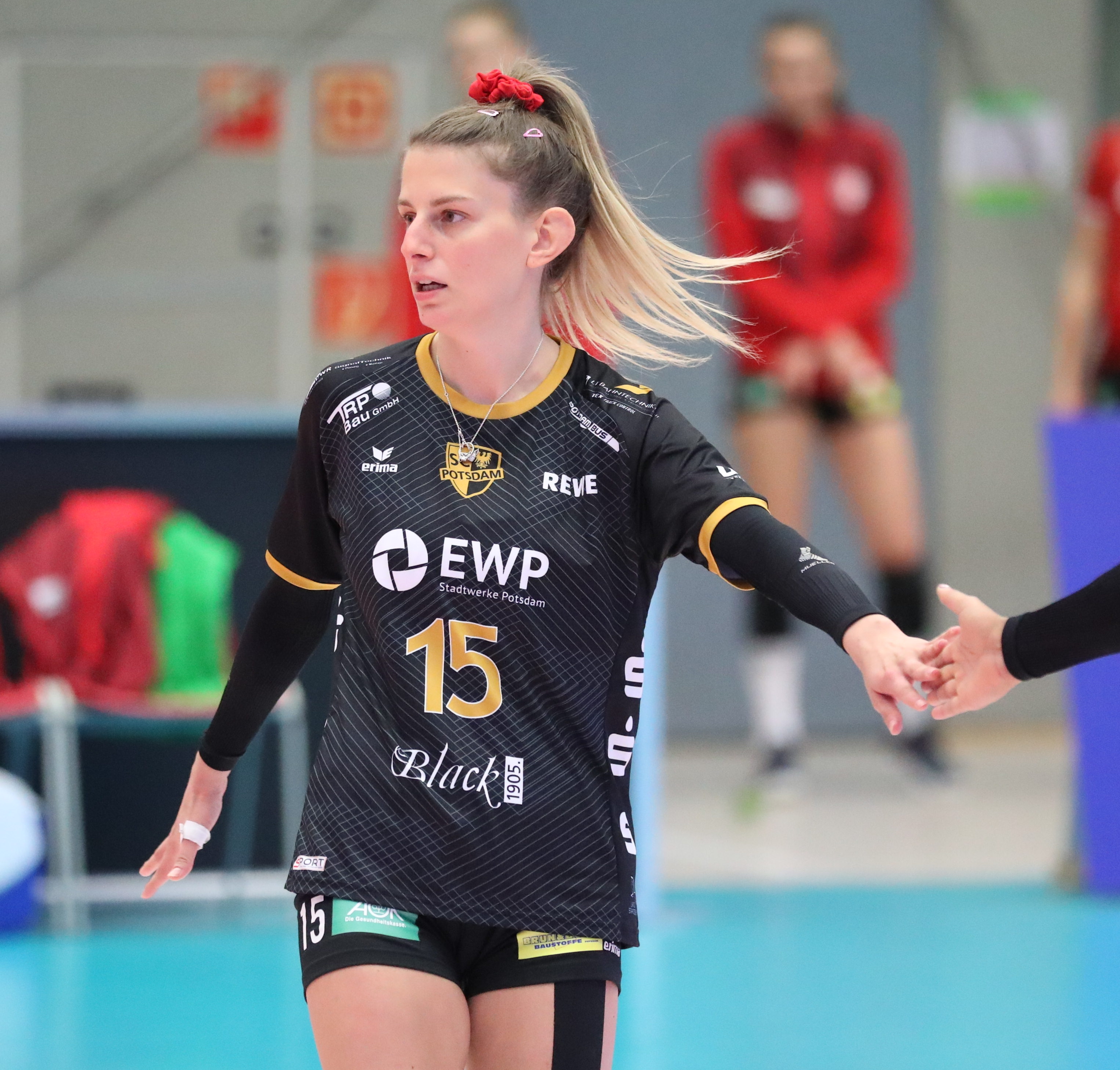

Personal information
- Nationality: Serbian
- Born: 9 October 1994 (age 32); Belgrade, Serbia, FR Yugoslavia
- Height: 1.67 m (5 ft 6 in)

Volleyball information
- Position: Libero
- Current club: Vakıfbank

Career
Years	Teams
2011–12; 2012–13; 2013–14; 2014–15; 2015–18; 2018–23; 2023–2024; 2024-2025; 2025-2026; 2026-	(Serbia) Radnički Beograd (Serbia) OK Kolubara Lazarevac (Serbia) OK Železničar (Serbia) Radnički Beograd (Serbia) ŽOK Spartak (Germany) SC Potsdam (Germany) Dresdner SC 1898 (Romania) Rapid București (United States) Columbus Fury (Turkey) Vakıfbank

National team
2022–	Serbia
Honours
World Championship
Gold medal – first place	2022 Netherlands/Poland	Team
European Championship
Silver medal – second place	2023 Belgium/Estonia/Germany/Italy

Aleksandra Jegdić (Serbian Cyrillic: Александра Јегдић; born 9 October 1994) is a Serbian volleyball player for SC Potsdam and the Serbian national team.

Jegdić started playing volleyball at school at the age of nine. In Serbia she played for Radnički Belgrade, Kolubara Lazarevac and OK Spartak Subotica. She also took part in European Cup competitions. In 2018, she was signed by the German Bundesliga club SC Potsdam.

She participated at 2023 World Championship and 2023 European Championship.

== Awards ==
=== National team ===
- 2022 World Championship - Gold Medal
- 2023 European Championship - Silver Medal

=== Club ===
Serbian Cup

- 2015–16 Serbian Cup – Bronze medal, with ŽOK Spartak
- 2016–17 Serbian Cup – Bronze medal, with ŽOK Spartak

Serbian Superleague

- 2015–16 Serbian Superleague – Bronze medal, with ŽOK Spartak

Volleyball-Bundesliga

- 2018–19 Volleyball-Bundesliga – Bronze medal, with SC Potsdam
- 2021–22 Volleyball-Bundesliga – Runner-Up, with SC Potsdam
- 2022–23 Volleyball-Bundesliga – Runner-Up, with SC Potsdam
- 2023–24 Volleyball-Bundesliga – Bronze medal, with Dresdner SC 1898

German Cup

- 2018–19 German Cup – Bronze medal, with SC Potsdam
- 2020–21 German Cup – Runner-Up, with SC Potsdam
- 2021–22 German Cup – Bronze medal, with SC Potsdam
- 2022–23 German Cup – Runner-Up, with SC Potsdam
- 2023–24 German Cup – Bronze medal, with Dresdner SC 1898

German SuperCup

- 2022–23 German Cup – Champion, with SC Potsdam

CEV Champions League

- 2025/26 CEV Champions League - Champion, with VakifBank Istanbul

== Personal life ==
She is married to volleyball coach Vladimir Kapriš.
