= Miku Akimoto =

Japanese volleyball player (born 2006)

Personal information
- Nationality: Japanese
- Born: 18 August 2006 (age 20) Kanagawa, Japan
- Height: 1.85 m (6 ft 1 in)
- Weight: 64 kg (141 lb)
- Spike: 316 cm (124 in)
- Block: 298 cm (117 in)

Volleyball information
- Position: Outside hitter
- Current club: (Germany) Dresdner SC 1898
- Number: 33 (national); 10 (club)

Career
- Years: Team
- 2022–2025 2024–2025 2025-present: (Japan) Kyoei Gakuen High School (Japan) Victorina Himeji (Germany) Dresdner SC 1898

National team
- Years: Team
- 2022–: Japan
Honours
Women's volleyball
Representing Japan
AVC Continental Championship
| Bronze medal – third place | 2026 Tianjin | Team |
Asian U20 Championship
| Silver medal – second place | 2024 Jiangmen | Team |
Asian U18 Championship
| Gold medal – first place | 2022 Nakhon Pathom | Team |

Miku Akimoto (秋本 美空, Akimoto Miku; born 18 August 2006) is a Japanese professional volleyball player. She plays in the Bundesliga for Dresdner SC 1898.

== Biography ==
Akimoto is the eldest daughter of former Japan national team player Ai Otomo and professional beach volleyball player Tatsuo Yamamoto. Her step father is judoka Hiroyuki Akimoto. She started playing volleyball in the second grade of elementary school.

In 2026, following the divorce of her stepfather, Hiroyuki Akimoto, and her mother, Ai Otomo, she changed her surname to her mother's maiden name and will compete under the name Miku Otomo from now on.。

== Career ==
=== Early years ===
She started playing volleyball with the local Tsukuba United junior team.

In 2019, Akimoto enrolled in Kyoei Gakuen Junior High School. During her junior high school years, she mainly played as an opposite hitter. She also had experience as a middle blocker and setter. In her third year, she was recognized as a promising Olympic athlete at the National Prefectural Junior High School Tournament (JOC Cup), and was subsequently selected as a certified player for the National Junior High School Selection Team.

In March 2022, before enrolling at Kyoei Gakuen High School, she made her high school volleyball debut as a player for the school in the All Japan Private High School Boys' and Girls' Volleyball Championship (Sakura Volleyball). In April the same year, she enrolled at Kyoei Gakuen High School. In June the same year, she was selected to represent Japan at the 14th Asian U18 Championship in Thailand where she won the championship despite limited playing time due to injury.

In 2023, she competed in the 75th All Japan High School Championship (Haruko) and reached the quarterfinals. She was also selected as a member of Japan women's national volleyball team at the age of 16 (second grade of high school). In the same year, she was also selected for U19 World Championship. She was the top scorer despite her team finished in fourth place.

In 2024, she was selected to represent Japan in the Asian U20 Championship in China. She contributed to the team's runner-up finish and was awarded Best Opposite.

In 2025, at the 77th All Japan High School Championship, she scored 42 points in the semi-final against Shujitsu High School and 35 points against Shimokitazawa Seitoku High School in the finals,contributing to Kyoei Gakuen's first championship in 19 years. She was awarded MVP.

=== Professional years ===
On 16 January 2025, it was announced that she have signed contract with Victorina Himeji. She made her SV.League debut on 8 March against NEC Red Rockets Kawasaki.

In 2025, she was selected for national team again and registered for 2025 VNL. She made her senior national team debut and scored her first point as a subtitute in the first match of the week against the Netherland.

In August 2025, it was announced that she would be loaned to Dresdner SC 1898 in the Bundesliga. She scored 19 points in her debut in the German Super Cup and was named MVP.

== Award ==
=== Individual ===
- 2023 U19 World Championship – Best Scorer
- 2024 Asian U20 Championship – Best Opposite
- 2024-25 All Japan High School Championship – MVP
- 2025-26 German Super Cup – Best Outside Hitter, MVP

=== High School Team ===
- 2024-25 All Japan High School Championship – – Champion, with Kyoei Gakuen High School

=== Club Team ===
- 2024-25 Empress' Cup All Japan Volleyball Championship – – Champion, with Victorina Himeji
- 2025-26 CEV Cup – – Bronze Medal, with Dresdner SC 1898
- 2025-26 German Cup – – Bronze Medal – with Dresdner SC 1898
- 2025-26 German Super Cup – – Champion, with Dresdner SC 1898

=== National Team ===
- (China) 2022 Asian U18 Championship – – Champion
- (China) 2024 Asian U20 Championship – – Runner-up
- (China) 2026 AVC Women's Volleyball Continental Championship - - Bronze Medal
