= Tore Aleksandersen =

Norwegian women's volleyball coach (1968–2023)

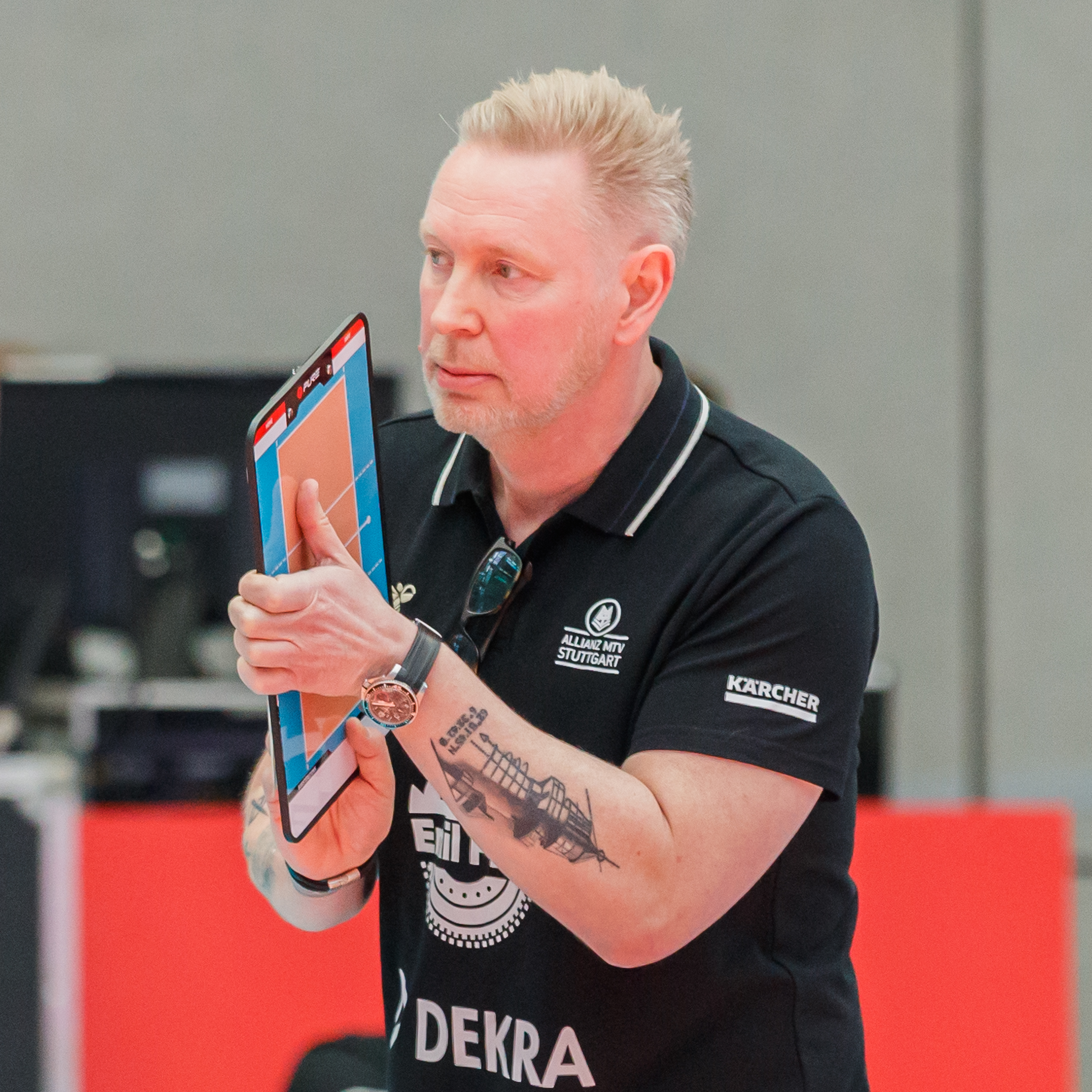
- Aleksandersen in 2021

Personal information
- Nationality: Norwegian
- Born: 27 February 1968 Molde, Norway
- Died: 6 December 2023 (aged 55)

Tore Aleksandersen (27 February 1968 – 6 December 2023) was a Norwegian women's volleyball coach. He was the head coach of German club Allianz MTV Stuttgart, a club that plays in the first-tier German Volleyball League, until his death in 2023. He also coached the Norwegian women's national volleyball team.

== Career ==
In the 1990s, Aleksandersen started his coaching career in Norway with the Aukra VBK team, where he started competing in the Norwegian 1st League Division. In 2001, he went to the US for experience in the United States Professional Volleyball League and was successful with the Minnesota Chill when he won the league.

After Aleksandersen coached Arie Selinger for a few weeks in Japan, he landed at German Volleyball League club Schweriner SC. In 2006, he was a German Volleyball League and German Women's Volleyball Cup winner. In 2007, he came in second in Germany as the DVV Cup winner. After five years in Germany, Aleksandersen returned to Norway for family reasons, where he coached KFUM in 2009, and in 2010 with UiS Volley, he became the Norwegian champion, and then he looked for the Norwegian women's national team.

From January 2010, Aleksandersen was a trainer in Germany at Schweriner SC and was also the head coach of the Finland women's national volleyball team. In the 2010–11 season, he secured the German championship with Schweriner SC, then left the club to concentrate on his position as Finland women's national team coach. From 2012 to 2017, he was a coach with the Polish first division teams Wrocław and then BKS Stal Bielsko-Biała.

Aleksandersen was a Norway national team coach again, beginning in 2018 until the 2019–20 season, when he moved to train the Turkish club Nilüfer Belediyespor. After one year he returned to Germany to take over Allianz MTV Stuttgart. The team finished in the second position in the 2021 season, Aleksandersen's second season with Stuttgart. The team finished the season as champions, and won the German Women's Volleyball Cup and reached the final of the CEV Cup in the same year.

== Personal life ==
Aleksandersen was born in Molde on 27 February 1968. He was married and had three children. In spring 2020, he was diagnosed with prostate cancer. Aleksandersen died from the disease on 6 December 2023, at the age of 55.

== Teams coached ==
- Norway national team 2023
- Allianz MTV Stuttgart 2020–2023
- Nilüfer Belediyespor 2019–2020
- Norway national team 2018–2022
- Bielsko-Biała 2015–2018
- Impel Wrocław 2013–2015
- Finland national team 2010–2013
- Schweriner SC 2010–2011
- UiS Volley 2009–2010
- KFUM/Stavanger 2008–2009
- Norway national team 2008–2009
- Schweriner SC 2003—2008
- Minnesota Chill 2001–2002
- Aukra VBK 1998–2001
