= German Women's 2 Volleyball Bundesliga =

Women's Volleyball 2. Bundesliga Pro
- Current season, competition or edition: 2023–24 Women's Volleyball 2. Bundesliga Pro
- Sport: Volleyball
- Founded: 1976; 50 years ago
- Administrator: DVV
- No. of teams: 13 (2023–24)
- Country: Germany
- Confederation: CEV
- Continent: Europe
- Level on pyramid: Level 2
- Promotion to: Volleyball Bundesliga
- Relegation to: 2. Bundesliga North; 2. Bundesliga South
- Domestic cup: German Cup
- Website: Volleyball-Bundesliga.de

The Women's 2. Volleyball Bundesliga Pro or in (German : Die 2. Volleyball-Bundesliga der Frauen) is the second highest division in German women's volleyball. After the season 2022–23 the new 2. Volleyball-Bundesliga Pro (de) has replace 2. Volleyball Bundesliga.

The league is now consider it as a second division in the German women's volleyball system.
