= 2020–21 German Women's Volleyball League =

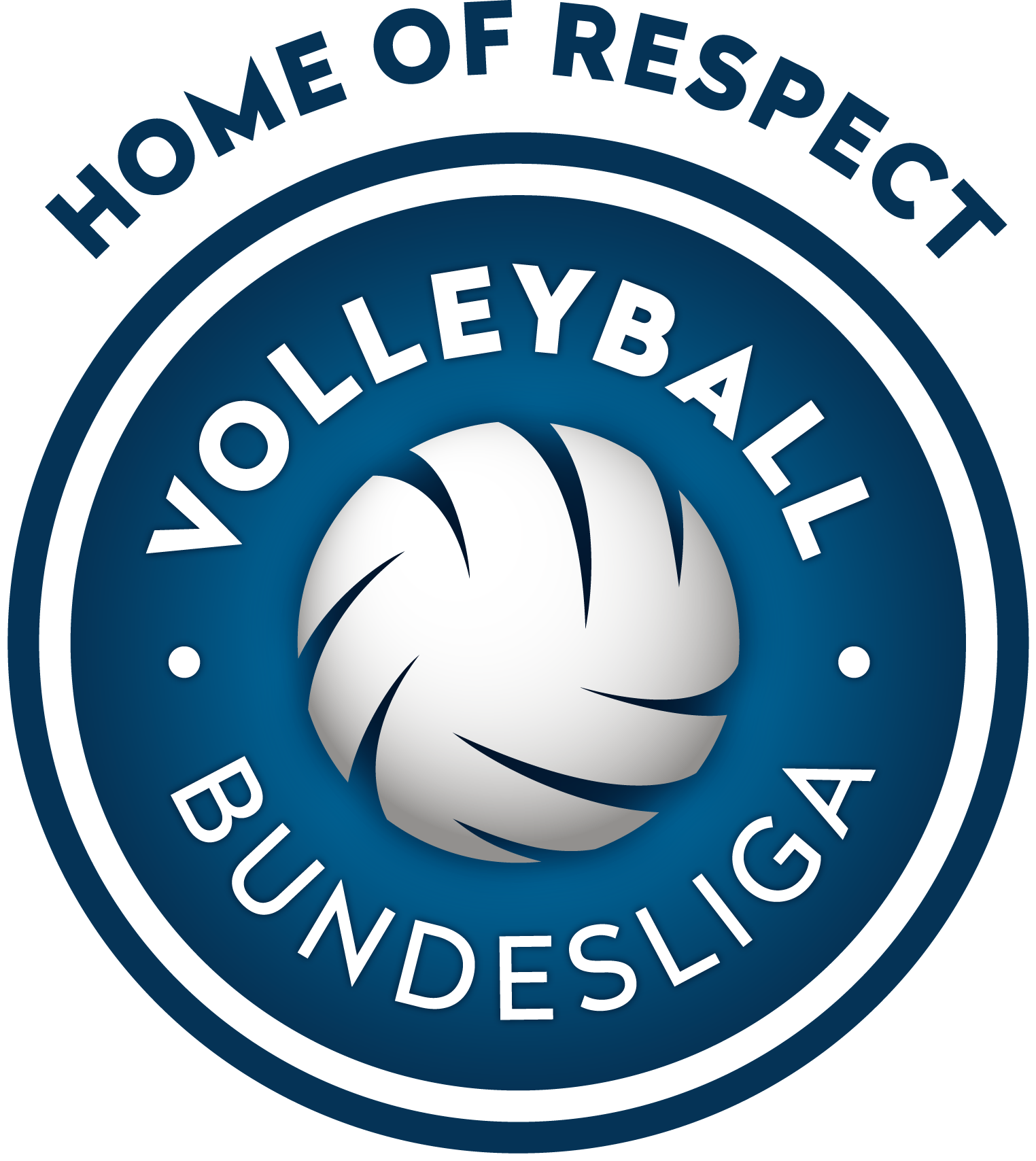

Seasons
- Bundesliga 2019/20 Bundesliga 2021/22

The 2020/21 German Women's Volleyball League season began on October 3, 2020 and ended with the last playoff final game on April 24, 2021. Since the 2019/20 season was canceled due to the COVID-19 pandemic, there was no defending champion.

Dresdner SC prevailed in the playoff final against Allianz MTV Stuttgart and thus became German champions.

Teams of the Volleyball Bundesliga (women) 2020/21

== Teams ==
This season the following eleven teams played in the first division:

- Ladies in Black Aachen
- Dresdner SC
- Black and White Erfurt
- USC Münster
- SC Potsdam
- SSC Palmberg Schwerin
- NawaRo Straubing
- Allianz MTV Stuttgart
- VfB Suhl Lotto Thuringia
- Rote Raben Vilsbiburg
- 1. VC Wiesbaden

There was no newcomer. The German youth team VC Olympia Berlin played again this season in the 2. Bundesliga North.

== Main round ==
The women's Bundesliga was made up of eleven teams in the 2020/21 season, which initially competed against each other in the two rounds. There was no relegation.

=== Results ===
Because of the COVID-19 pandemic in Germany, numerous games had to be postponed to another date.

Status: March 13, 2021	LIB	DSC	Result	USC	Pot	SSC	Str	Stu	Suhl	RRV	VCW
Ladies in Black Aachen		0: 3	3: 1	3: 0	2: 3	3: 2	3: 0	0: 3	0: 3	1: 3	3: 2
Dresdner SC	3: 0		3: 0	3: 0	3: 0	3: 0	3: 0	0: 3	3: 1	3: 1	3-0
Black and white Erfurt	2: 3	0: 3		3: 2	1: 3	1: 3	1: 3	1: 3	2: 3	0: 3	3: 2
USC Münster	3: 1	0: 3	3: 0		0: 3	3: 1	2: 3	1: 3	3: 0	2: 3	3: 2
SC Potsdam	3: 1	3: 0	3: 0	3: 0		2: 3	0: 3	3: 0	3: 0	1: 3	3-0
SSC Palmberg Schwerin	3: 1	0: 3	3: 0	3: 0	3: 2		3: 0	0: 3	3: 1	3: 0	3: 1
NaWaRo Straubing	2: 3	0: 3	3: 1	3: 0	0: 3	2: 3		3: 0	0: 3	0: 3	3: 1
Allianz MTV Stuttgart	3: 1	3: 0	3: 0	3: 1	3: 0	0: 3	3: 0		3: 0	3: 0	3-0
VfB Suhl Lotto Thuringia	3: 0	1: 3	3: 0	3: 0	3: 2	1: 3	3: 0	3: 2		3: 2	0: 3
Rote Raben Vilsbiburg	2: 3	1: 3	3: 1	3: 0	2: 3	0: 3	3: 0	2: 3	1: 3		3-0
1. VC Wiesbaden	3: 2	0: 3	3: 0	2: 3	1: 3	3: 2	3: 0	0: 3	1: 3	0: 3	
Home team in the left column, visiting team in the top row

=== table ===
Since the 2013/14 season, the following rule of points has been in force for the DVV's game operations: three points are awarded for a 3-0 or 3-1 win, two points for a 3-2 win and two points for a 2-3 defeat one point and no point for a 1-3 or 3-0 defeat. In the event of a tie, the number of games won first decides, then the set quotient (division method) and finally the ball point quotient (division method).

	society	Number Games	Points	Games	sentences	Balls
1.	Dresdner SC '(P)'	20	51	17	51:13	1555: 1293
2.	Allianz MTV Stuttgart	20	48	16	50:18	1634: 1369
3.	SSC Palmberg Schwerin	20	41	14	47:29	1721: 1606
4.	SC Potsdam	20	40	13	46: 28	1684: 1547
5.	Rote Raben Vilsbiburg	20	33	10	41:35	1659: 1647
6.	VfB Suhl Lotto Thuringia	20	32	12	40:34	1626: 1605
7.	NawaRo Straubing	20	22	7	25:44	1454: 1560
8.	Ladies in Black Aachen	20	21	8	33:47	1732: 1841
9.	USC Münster	20	19	6	26:48	1562: 1686
10.	1. VC Wiesbaden	20	17	5	27:49	1582: 1724
11.	Black and white Erfurt	20	6	2	17:58	1441: 1772
As of March 13, 2021

Legend

	Play-off participants
(P)	DVV-Pokal - Winner 2019/20

== Play-offs ==
The teams in the first eight places qualified for the playoffs. Except for the final (Best-of-Five-Modus) all games were played in Best-of-Three-Modus.

quarter finals
1.	'Dresden'	3	3	-
8.	Aachen	1	2	-
4.	'Potsdam'	3	3	-
5.	Vilsbiburg	1	1	-
3.	'Schwerin'	2	3	3
6.	Suhl	3	1	0
2.	'Stuttgart'	3	3	-
7.	Straubing	0	0	-

semi-finals
1.	'Dresden'	3	3	-
4.	Potsdam	1	2	-
3.	Schwerin	3	0	0
2.	'Stuttgart'	0	3	3

final
1.	'Dresden'	0	2	3	3	3
2.	Stuttgart	3	3	2	2	0

== Venues ==
society	Hall	capacity
Ladies in Black Aachen	Sports hall Neuköllner Straße	1,268
Dresdner SC	Margon Arena	3,450
Black and white Erfurt	Riethsporthalle Erfurt	1,520
USC Münster	Berg Fidel sports hall	3,300
SC Potsdam	MBS Arena Potsdam	2,048
SSC Palmberg Schwerin	Palmberg Arena Schwerin	1.914
NawaRo Straubing	turmair volleyball arena	1.006
Allianz MTV Stuttgart	Scharrena Stuttgart	2,039
VfB Suhl Lotto Thuringia	Wolfsgrube sports hall	1,816
Rote Raben Vilsbiburg	Ball sports hall Vilsbiburg	2,000
1. VC Wiesbaden	Sports hall at the Platz der Deutschen Einheit	2,105
