= Athina Papafotiou =

Greek volleyball player (born 1989)

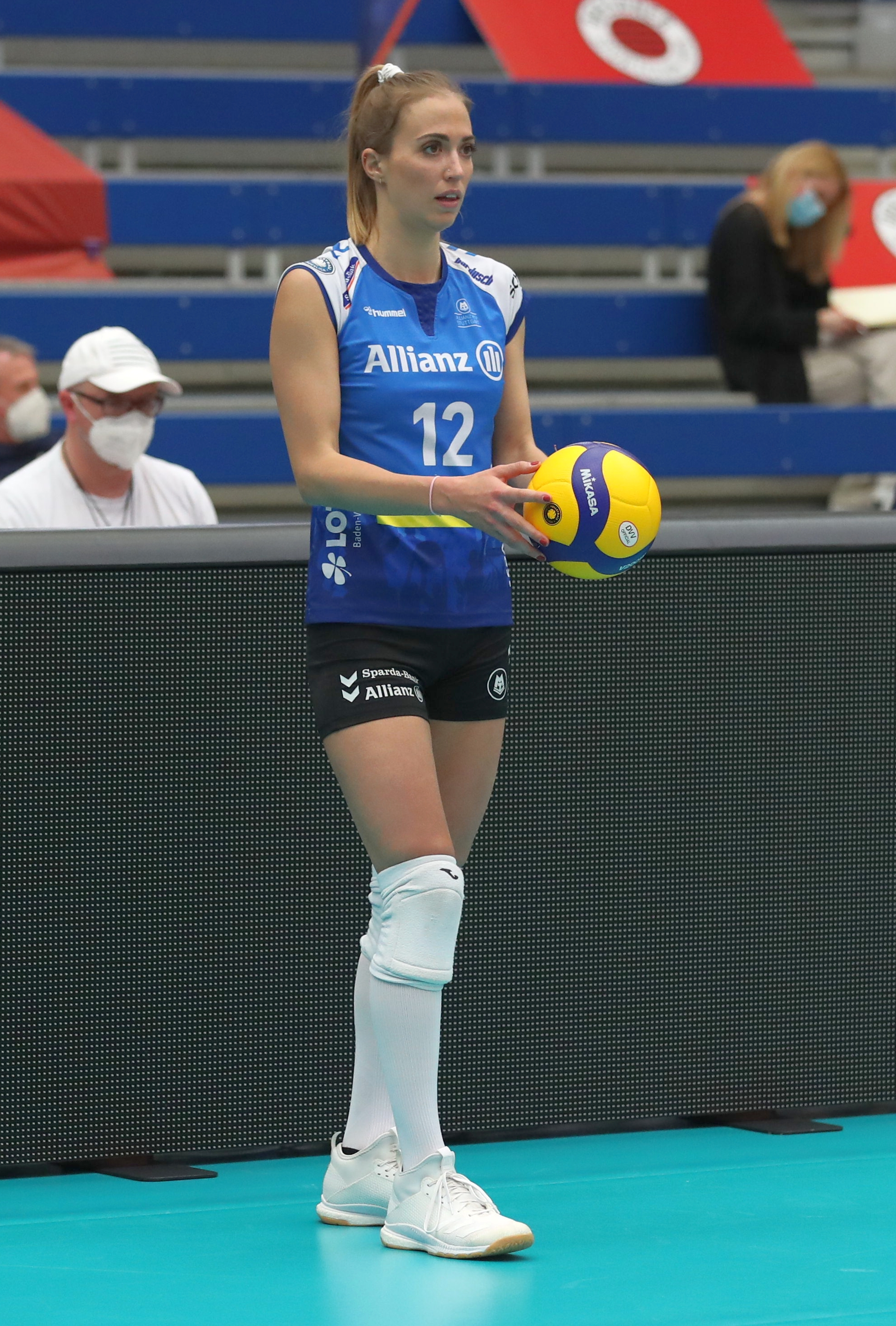
- Papafotiou playing for Allianz MTV Stuttgart in 2021

Personal information
- Nationality: Greece
- Born: 23 August 1989 (age 37); Athens, Greece
- Height: 1.81 m (5 ft 11 in)
- Weight: 69 kg (152 lb)
- Spike: 278 cm (109 in)
- Block: 266 cm (105 in)

Volleyball information
- Position: Setter

Career
Years	Teams
2007–2008; 2008–2009; 2009–2010; 2010–2011; 2011–2014; 2014–2015; 2015–2017; 2017–2018; 2018; 2018–2019; 2020–2021; 2021–2025	(Greece) Ilisakos (Greece) AE Agias Paraskevis (Greece) Panionios (Greece) Panathinaikos (Greece) AEK Athens (Germany) Allianz MTV Stuttgart (France) ASPTT Mulhouse (Italy) Imoco Volley (Poland) ŁKS Łódź (France) ASPTT Mulhouse (Germany) Allianz MTV Stuttgart (Greece) Panathinaikos

National team
Greece

Athina Papafotiou is a female professional volleyball player from Greece. She plays as setter.

In 2014–15, Athina Papafotiou played for Allianz MTV Stuttgart. There, Papafotiou played alongside Kim Renkema who later became the club's sporting director.

In April 2020, she returned to Stuttgart.

In Mai 2021, she signed with Panathinaikos again after ten years of absence.

== Awards and accomplishments ==
=== Pro career ===
- A1 Ethniki Women's Volleyball champion

2011, 2012, 2022, 2023, 2024

- Greek Women's Volleyball Cup winner

2022

- German Women's Volleyball League cup winner

2015

- French Women's Volleyball League winner

2017

- Italian Women's Volleyball League winner

2018

=== Personal Awards ===
- French Women's Volleyball League MVP

2019

- French Women's Volleyball League Best Passer

2016, 2017, 2019

- A1 Ethniki Women's Volleyball MVP

2023
