= Marie Schölzel =

German volleyball player (born 1997)

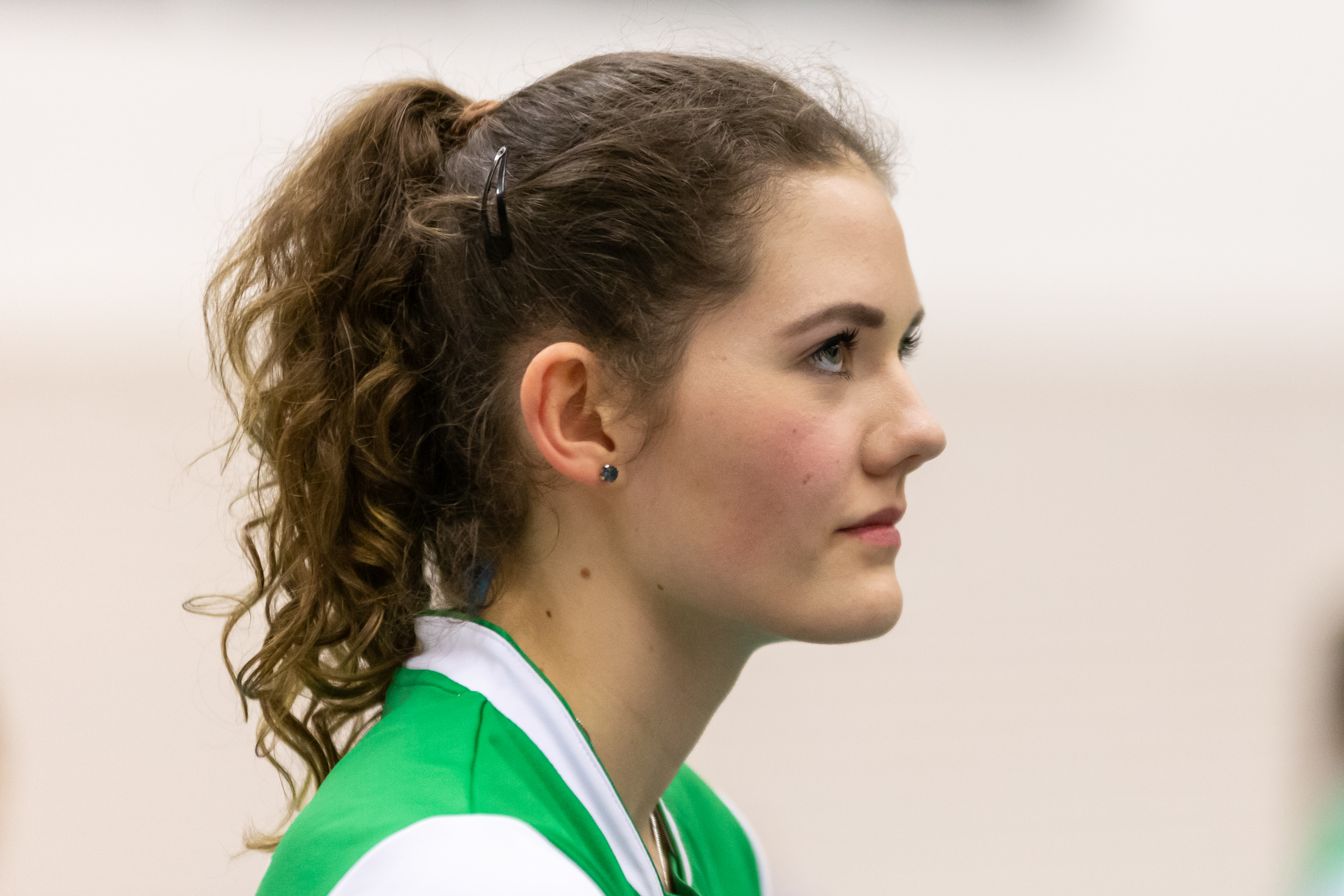
- Marie Schölzel in Erfurt (2019)

Personal information
- Nationality: German
- Born: 1 August 1997 (age 29); Berlin
- Height: 1.90 m (6 ft 3 in)
- Weight: 66 kg (146 lb)
- Spike: 307 cm (121 in)
- Block: 299 cm (118 in)

Volleyball information
- Position: Middle blocker
- Current club: (Germany) SSC Palmberg Schwerin
- Number: 16

National team
2015	Germany
Honours
Women's volleyball
Representing Germany
German League
Gold medal – first place	2020 Germany	Team
Gold medal – first place	2021 Germany	Team

Marie Schölzel (born 1 August 1997) is a German volleyball player. She made her début in the national team in 2015, and since then has been playing with SSC Palmberg Schwerin.

== Career ==
Schölzel started her career at the age of 8 at SG Rotation Prenzlauer Berg. In 2011, she became the German champion in the under-16 group, and in 2014, champion in the under-18 and under-20 group.

In 2015, Schölzel made her début in Germany women's national volleyball team in Montreux. In 2015, she started playing with Schweriner SC. In 2016/17, she reached the cup final with her team and became German champion. In 2018, she could not perform at the 2018 World Championship due to an injury. In the 2019/20 DVV-Pokal, the team reached the semi-finals. The season was cancelled due to COVID-19, however SSC Palmberg Schwerin was in first position. In 2021, her team won the DVV Pokal.
