= Stephanie Samedy =

American volleyball player

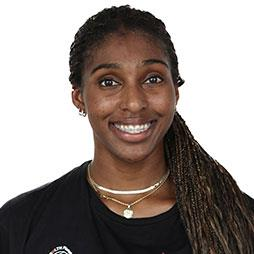
- Samedy in 2022

Personal information
- Nationality: United States
- Born: September 27, 1998 (age 28)
- Height: 6 ft 2 in (1.88 m)
- Education: University of Minnesota

Volleyball information
- Position: Opposite
- Current club: (Japan) Hisamitsu Springs

Career
Years	Teams
2017–2021	(United States) Minnesota
2021–2022	(Germany) SSC Palmberg Schwerin
2022-2023	(Italy) Wealth Planet Perugia Volley
2022-2023	(Italy) Imoco Volley Conegliano
2023-2024	(Turkey) SigortaShop
2023-2024	(United States) Omaha Supernovas
2024-2026	(Japan) Hisamitsu Springs
2027	(United States) Minnesota Forge

National team
2015	United States U18 Team
2022–	United States
Medal record
Women's volleyball
Representing the United States
Pan-American Cup
Bronze medal – third place	2022 Hermosillo
Bronze medal – third place	2023 Ponce
Pan American Cup Final Six
Gold medal – first place	2023 Santo Domingo
FIVB U18 World Championship
Silver medal – second place	2015 Lima	Team

Stephanie Samedy (born September 27, 1998) is an American professional volleyball player who plays as an opposite hitter for Italian Series A1 team Imoco Volley Conegliano. She played collegiately at the University of Minnesota.

== Personal life ==
Samedy is from Clermont, Florida and played volleyball at her high school, East Ridge. She was the first volleyball athlete in her high school's history to sign with an NCAA Division I program when she signed with Minnesota. She was named an Under Armour All-American and was the 2016-17 Florida Gatorade Volleyball Player of the Year, recording 424 kills, 189 digs, and 25 blocks during her senior year. She played on the youth and junior USA national teams, and won a silver medal at the 2015 FIVB Volleyball Girls' U18 World Championship.

== Career ==
=== College ===
Samedy became the first player in Minnesota's history to earn AVCA First Team All-American honors as a freshman. In her freshman season, she led the team with 478 kills. In her sophomore season, she was again selected as a First Team All-American, and again led the team with 359 kills. As a junior, she was named a second team All-American and led the team with 353 kills. She ended her career as a five time AVCA All-American at the University of Minnesota. She was eligible to receive the award five time due to the extra year of eligibility granted by the NCAA due to the COVID-19 pandemic. She is one of only two five time All-Americans in NCAA history. Samedy helped Minnesota to a conference championship in 2018 and an NCAA Final Four appearance in 2019.

Samedy was named the Big Ten Player of the Year in 2020 and 2021. She finished her career as only the second player in conference history to surpass 2,000 kills and 1,500 digs. She was named First Team All-Big Ten all five seasons, one of only two players in conference history to do so.

=== Professional clubs ===
- (Germany) SSC Palmberg Schwerin (2021–2022)
- (Italy) Wealth Planet Perugia Volley (2022)
- (Italy) Imoco Volley Conegliano (2023)
- (Turkey) SigortaShop (2023)
- (United States) Omaha Supernovas (2023)
- (Japan) Hisamitsu Springs (2024-2026)
- (United States) Minnesota Forge (2027)

== Awards and honors ==
=== Clubs ===
- 2021–2022 German Super Cup – Silver medal, with SSC Palmberg Schwerin.

=== College ===
- AVCA All-American (First Team in 2017, 2018, 2020, and 2021; Second Team in 2019)
- Big Ten Player of the Year (2020, 2021)
- Senior CLASS Award winner in volleyball (2020)
- Five Time First Team All-Big Ten (2017–2021)
