= 2018 Women's Pan-American Volleyball Cup =

Tournament details
- Host country: Dominican Republic
- Dates: 8–14 July
- Teams: 12
- Venue: 1 (in 1 host city)

Final positions
- Champions: United States (6th title)

Tournament awards
- MVP: Lauren Carlini (USA)

The 2018 Women's Pan-American Volleyball Cup was the 17th edition of the annual women's volleyball tournament. It was held in Santo Domingo, Dominican Republic from 8 to 14 July. Twelve teams competed and the top five ranked teams at the end of the tournament qualified to the 2019 Pan American Games in Lima, Peru.

The United States won the second straight title (sixth in history) after defeating the Dominican Republic 3–2 in the final. American Lauren Carlini was awarded the Most Valuable Player.

== Pools composition ==
Pool A	Pool B	Pool C
Canada	Cuba	Argentina
Costa Rica	Puerto Rico	Brazil
Dominican Republic	Trinidad and Tobago	Colombia
Peru	United States	Mexico

== Venue ==
- Ricardo Arias Gymnasium, Santo Domingo

== Pool standing procedure ==
1. Number of matches won
2. Match points
3. Points ratio
4. Sets ratio
5. Result of the last match between the tied teams

Match won 3–0: 5 match points for the winner, 0 match points for the loser
Match won 3–1: 4 match points for the winner, 1 match point for the loser
Match won 3–2: 3 match points for the winner, 2 match points for the loser

== Preliminary round ==
- All times are Atlantic Standard Time (UTC−04:00)

=== Group A ===
Pos	Team	Pld	W	L	Pts	SPW	SPL	SPR	SW	SL	SR	Qualification
1	Canada	3	3	0	15	225	134	1.679	9	0	MAX	Semifinals
2	Dominican Republic	3	2	1	10	207	162	1.278	6	3	2.000	Quarterfinals
3	Peru	3	1	2	5	172	205	0.839	3	6	0.500	7th–10th classification
4	Costa Rica	3	0	3	0	122	225	0.542	0	9	0.000	

Date	Time		Score		Set 1	Set 2	Set 3	Set 4	Set 5	Total	Report
8 Jul	14:20	Canada	3–0	Peru	25–21	25–12	25–17			75–50	P2 P3
8 Jul	22:15	Dominican Republic	3–0	Costa Rica	25–14	25–10	25–16			75–40	P2 P3
9 Jul	10:00	Costa Rica	0–3	Canada	10–25	10–25	7–25			27–75	P2 P3
10 Jul	01:35	Dominican Republic	3–0	Peru	25–16	25–15	25–16			75–47	P2 P3
10 Jul	21:05	Dominican Republic	0–3	Canada	23–25	14–25	20–25			57–75	P2 P3
10 Jul	23:00	Peru	3–0	Costa Rica	25–22	25–18	25–15			75–55	P2 P3

=== Group B ===
Pos	Team	Pld	W	L	Pts	SPW	SPL	SPR	SW	SL	SR	Qualification
1	United States	3	2	1	11	279	230	1.213	8	4	2.000	Quarterfinals
2	Puerto Rico	3	2	1	8	249	242	1.029	6	5	1.200	Quarterfinals
3	Cuba	3	2	1	8	234	245	0.955	6	5	1.200	7th–10th classification
4	Trinidad and Tobago	3	0	3	3	248	293	0.846	3	9	0.333	

Date	Time		Score		Set 1	Set 2	Set 3	Set 4	Set 5	Total	Report
8 Jul	10:00	Trinidad and Tobago	1–3	United States	25–21	15–25	22–25	15–25		77–96	P2 P3
8 Jul	19:00	Puerto Rico	3–0	Cuba	25–13	25–22	25–23			75–58	P2 P3
9 Jul	12:00	Trinidad and Tobago	2–3	Puerto Rico	28–30	20–25	25–21	28–26	8–15	109–117	P2 P3
9 Jul	22:50	Cuba	3–2	United States	18–25	25–22	25–23	13–25	15–13	96–108	P2 P3
10 Jul	12:00	Cuba	3–0	Trinidad and Tobago	25–15	30–28	25–19			80–62	P2 P3
10 Jul	19:10	United States	3–0	Puerto Rico	25–22	25–21	25–14			75–57	P2 P3

=== Group C ===
Pos	Team	Pld	W	L	Pts	SPW	SPL	SPR	SW	SL	SR	Qualification
1	Brazil	3	3	0	11	286	251	1.139	9	4	2.250	Semifinals
2	Colombia	3	2	1	10	285	253	1.126	8	5	1.600	Quarterfinals
3	Mexico	3	1	2	5	181	205	0.883	3	6	0.500	7th–10th classification
4	Argentina	3	0	3	4	243	286	0.850	4	9	0.444	7th–10th classification

Date	Time		Score		Set 1	Set 2	Set 3	Set 4	Set 5	Total	Report
8 Jul	12:30	Brazil	3–0	Mexico	25–21	25–19	25–17			75–57	P2 P3
8 Jul	16:10	Argentina	2–3	Colombia	16–25	16–25	25–22	25–18	15–17	97–107	P2 P3
9 Jul	18:00	Colombia	2–3	Brazil	25–18	26–24	16–25	23–25	13–15	103–107	P2 P3
9 Jul	21:00	Mexico	3–0	Argentina	25–20	25–15	25–20			75–55	P2 P3
10 Jul	14:35	Colombia	3–0	Mexico	25–15	25–22	25–12			75–49	P2 P3
10 Jul	16:40	Brazil	3–2	Argentina	20–25	25–20	25–15	19–25	15–6	104–91	P2 P3

== Final round ==
=== Championship bracket ===
Quarterfinals
A2	Dominican Republic	3
B2	Puerto Rico	2
B1	United States	3
C2	Colombia	0

Semifinals
C1	Brazil	0
A2	Dominican Republic	3
A1	Canada	1
B1	United States	3

Final
A2	Dominican Republic	2
B1	United States	3
Third place
C1	Brazil	0
A1	Canada	3

=== 5th–8th places bracket ===
Classification 7–10
B3	Cuba	3
C4	Argentina	2
C3	Mexico	1
A3	Peru	3

Classification 5–8
B3	Cuba	0
C2	Colombia	3
A3	Peru	0
B2	Puerto Rico	3

5th place
C2	Colombia	3
B2	Puerto Rico	2
7th place
B3	Cuba	3
A3	Peru	1

=== 9th–12th places bracket ===
Classification 9–12
A4	Costa Rica	0
C4	Argentina	3
B4	Trinidad and Tobago	1
C3	Mexico	3

9th place
C4	Argentina	3
C3	Mexico	1
11th place
A4	Costa Rica	0
B4	Trinidad and Tobago	3

==== Classification 7th–10th ====
Date	Time		Score		Set 1	Set 2	Set 3	Set 4	Set 5	Total	Report
11 Jul	14:00	Cuba	3–2	Argentina	25–18	21–25	14–25	25–23	15–8	100–99	P2 P3
11 Jul	16:45	Mexico	1–3	Peru	25–16	22–25	29–31	32–34		108–106	P2 P3

==== Quarterfinals ====
Date	Time		Score		Set 1	Set 2	Set 3	Set 4	Set 5	Total	Report
11 Jul	19:45	United States	3–0	Colombia	25–12	25–17	25–17			75–46	P2 P3
11 Jul	21:25	Dominican Republic	3–2	Puerto Rico	25–21	18–25	21–25	25–22	15–10	104–103	P2 P3

==== Classification 9th–12th ====
Date	Time		Score		Set 1	Set 2	Set 3	Set 4	Set 5	Total	Report
12 Jul	14:00	Costa Rica	0–3	Argentina	16–25	13–25	12–25			41–75	P2 P3
12 Jul	16:00	Trinidad and Tobago	1–3	Mexico	15–25	15–25	25–19	17–25		72–94	P2 P3

==== Classification 5th–8th ====
Date	Time		Score		Set 1	Set 2	Set 3	Set 4	Set 5	Total	Report
12 Jul	18:00	Cuba	0–3	Colombia	20–25	21–25	17–25			58–75	P2 P3
12 Jul	20:00	Peru	0–3	Puerto Rico	20–25	16–25	20–25			56–75	P2 P3

==== 11th place match ====
Date	Time		Score		Set 1	Set 2	Set 3	Set 4	Set 5	Total	Report
13 Jul	14:00	Costa Rica	0–3	Trinidad and Tobago	24–26	18–25	16–25			58–76	P2 P3

==== 9th place match ====
Date	Time		Score		Set 1	Set 2	Set 3	Set 4	Set 5	Total	Report
13 Jul	16:00	Argentina	3–1	Mexico	23–25	25–22	25–22	25–19		98–88	P2 P3

==== Semifinals ====
Date	Time		Score		Set 1	Set 2	Set 3	Set 4	Set 5	Total	Report
13 Jul	18:00	Canada	1–3	United States	18–25	25–23	23–25	19–25		85–98	P2 P3
13 Jul	20:00	Brazil	0–3	Dominican Republic	16–25	12–25	23–25			51–75	P2 P3

==== 7th place match ====
Date	Time		Score		Set 1	Set 2	Set 3	Set 4	Set 5	Total	Report
14 Jul	12:00	Cuba	3–1	Peru	25–23	38–40	25–11	25–22		113–96	P2 P3

==== 5th place match ====
Date	Time		Score		Set 1	Set 2	Set 3	Set 4	Set 5	Total	Report
14 Jul	14:00	Colombia	3–2	Puerto Rico	25–15	22–25	21–25	25–21	15–12	108–98	P2 P3

==== 3rd place match ====
Date	Time		Score		Set 1	Set 2	Set 3	Set 4	Set 5	Total	Report
14 Jul	16:00	Brazil	0–3	Canada	19–25	20–25	21–25			60–75	P2 P3

==== Final ====
Date	Time		Score		Set 1	Set 2	Set 3	Set 4	Set 5	Total	Report
14 Jul	18:00	Dominican Republic	2–3	United States	26–24	25–21	21–25	19–25	8–15	99–110	P2 P3

== Final standing ==
Rank	Team
1st place, gold medalist(s)	United States
2nd place, silver medalist(s)	Dominican Republic
3rd place, bronze medalist(s)	Canada
4	Brazil
5	Colombia
6	Puerto Rico
7	Cuba
8	Peru
9	Argentina
10	Mexico
11	Trinidad and Tobago
12	Costa Rica

Qualified for the 2019 Pan American Games

2018 Women's Pan-American Cup

United States
6th title

14-woman roster
Jordyn Poulter, Justine Wong-Orantes, Lauren Carlini, Krystal Rivers, Simone Lee,
Sarah Wilhite, Adora Anae, Haleigh Washington, Aiyana Whitney, Amanda Benson,
Paige Tapp, Molly McCage, Kadie Rolfzen, Chiaka Ogbogu
Head Coach
Jona Newman-Gonchar

== Individual awards ==
- Most valuable player
  (United States) Lauren Carlini
- Best setter
  (United States) Lauren Carlini
- Best Outside Hitters
  (Dominican Republic) Brayelin Martínez
  (Argentina) Elina Rodríguez
- Best Middle Blockers
  (United States) Chiaka Ogbogu
  (Colombia) Melissa Rangel
- Best Opposite
  (Trinidad and Tobago) Krystle Esdelle
- Best scorer
  (Trinidad and Tobago) Krystle Esdelle
- Best server
  (Canada) Kiera Van Ryk
- Best libero
  (Dominican Republic) Brenda Castillo
- Best digger
  (Dominican Republic) Brenda Castillo
- Best receiver
  (Dominican Republic) Brenda Castillo
