= Micha Hancock =

American volleyball player

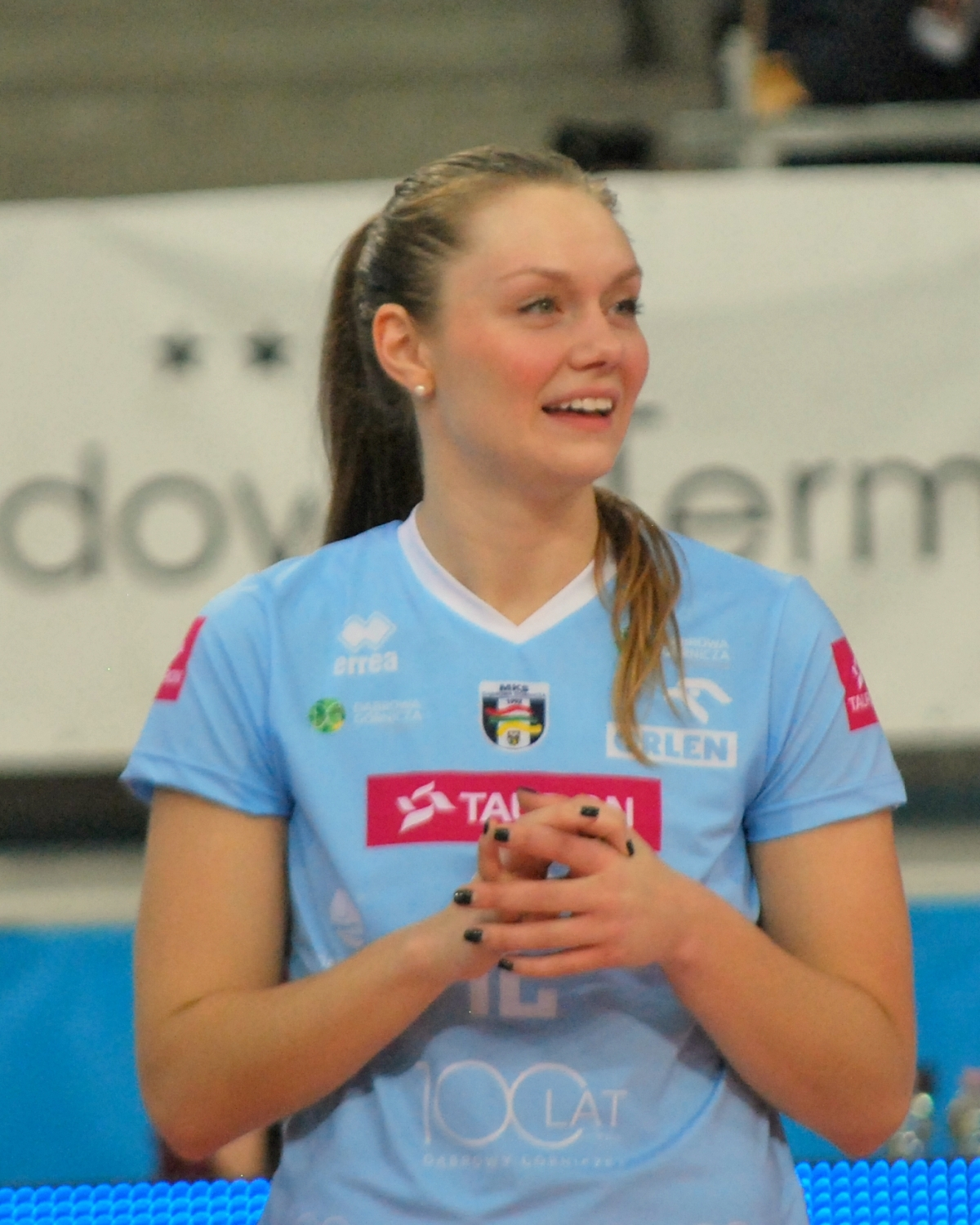
- Hancock in 2016

Personal information
- Full name: Micha Danielle Hancock
- Born: November 10, 1992 (age 33); McAlester, Oklahoma, U.S.
- Height: 5 ft 11 in (1.80 m)
- Weight: 168 lb (76 kg)
- Spike: 305 cm (120 in)
- Block: 297 cm (117 in)
- Education: Penn State

Volleyball information
- Position: Setter
- Current club: LOVB Houston
- Number: 12

Career
Years	Teams
2015	(Italy) Imoco Volley Conegliano
2015	(Puerto Rico) Indias de Mayagüez
2015–2016	(Poland) Dąbrowa Górnicza
2016–2017	(Poland) Impel Wrocław
2017–2019	(Italy) US Pro Victoria Monza
2019–2021	(Italy) Igor Gorgonzola Novara
2022–2023	(Italy) Megabox Volley Vallefoglia
2023–2024	(Italy) VBC Casalmaggiore
2024–present	(United States) LOVB Houston

National team
2014–	United States
Medal record
Women's volleyball
Representing the United States
Olympic Games
Gold medal – first place	2020 Tokyo	Team
Silver medal – second place	2024 Paris	Team
FIVB Nations League
Gold medal – first place	2018 Nanjing	Team
Gold medal – first place	2019 Nanjing	Team
Gold medal – first place	2021 Rimini	Team
Pan-American Cup
Gold medal – first place	2017 Cañete/Lima
Gold medal – first place	2019 Trujillo/Chiclayo
Bronze medal – third place	2016 Santo Domingo
Youth Olympic Games
Silver medal – second place	2010 Singapore	Team

Micha Danielle Hancock (/ˈmaɪkə/ MY-kə; born November 10, 1992) is an American indoor volleyball player for the United States women's national volleyball team. Hancock played setter for the Penn State women's volleyball team, and won back-to-back national championships in 2013 and 2014. Hancock won gold with the national team at the 2020 Tokyo Summer Olympics.

== Career ==
=== High school ===
Hancock played volleyball for Edmond Memorial High School in Edmond, Oklahoma. She guided her team to the 2007, 2009 and 2010 Oklahoma 6A State Championship, was a two-time All-Edmond Player of the Year, All-City Player of the Year and MVP of the State Championship All-Tournament Team. She was named the Oklahoma Gatorade Player of the Year twice.

=== College ===
She played college women's volleyball at Penn State University. In her freshman season in 2011, Hancock was the Big Ten Freshman of the Year as well as the AVCA Mideast Region Freshman of the Year and set the Penn State single-season aces record with 91. As a sophomore in 2012, she was a first-team All-American and Big Ten Setter of the Year. Hancock set the NCAA Tournament record for aces in tournament play with 22, including the Penn State single-match record for aces with 10. In her final two seasons, she helped Penn State win back-to-back NCAA titles. In 2013, Hancock was named a First-Team All-American and earned NCAA Tournament Most Outstanding Player honors, and she became the Nittany Lions' all-time career aces leader with 254. In 2014, she was named the AVCA National Player of the Year and her third consecutive First-Team All-America honor. Under her guidance, Hancock ranked first nationally as a college senior in aces per set (1.05) with at least one ace in all but three matches in 2014. Hancock finished her career among Penn State's all-time career record-holders, ranking first in service aces (380) and service aces per game (0.76), fifth in assists (5,578) and sixth in assists per game (11.16).

Hancock was named as one of the four finalists for the Honda Sports Award in volleyball for 2014–15.

== International ==
In the 2016 Pan-American Cup she was awarded Best Server after she set a new serving record in a single match, first with 11 aces in the pool play against Costa Rica, then 12 aces in the bronze medal match over Cuba. She was named Most Valuable Player in the 2017 Pan-American Cup. She was selected to play the Italian League All-Star game in 2017.

In May 2021, Hancock was named to the 18-player roster for the FIVB Volleyball Nations League tournament. It was the only major international competition before the 2020 Summer Olympics. U.S. won the gold medal for the third year in a row after defeating Brazil in the final.

On June 7, 2021, U.S. National Team head coach Karch Kiraly announced she would be part of the 12-player Olympic roster for the 2020 Summer Olympics in Tokyo. Primarily used as a backup setter and serving substitute, Hancock stepped in after starting setter Jordyn Poulter injured her ankle during U.S.'s final pool play match against Italy, helping lead the team to victory in 5 sets. In the quarterfinals against Dominican Republic, Hancock started again and led her to team to victory, advancing U.S. to the semifinals. Team USA eventually won the gold medal after defeating Brazil, 3 sets to none.

== Clubs ==
- (United States) Penn State University (2011–2014)
- (Italy) Imoco Volley Conegliano (2015)
- (Puerto Rico) Indias de Mayagüez (2015)
- (Poland) Dąbrowa Górnicza (2015–2016)
- (Poland) Impel Wrocław (2016–2017)
- (Italy) US Pro Victoria Monza (2017–2019)
- (Italy) Igor Gorgonzola Novara (2019–2021)
- (Italy) Megabox Volley Vallefoglia (2022–2023)
- (Italy) VBC Casalmaggiore (2023–2024)
- (United States) LOVB Houston (2024-present)

== Awards ==
=== Individuals ===
- 2015 Nominee for Honda Sports Award (volleyball)
- 2016 Pan-American Cup "Best Server"
- 2017 Pan-American Cup "Best Server"
- 2017 Pan-American Cup "Best Setter"
- 2017 Pan-American Cup "Most Valuable Player"
- 2019 Pan-American Cup "Most Valuable Player"

== See also ==
List of Pennsylvania State University Olympians
