= Roosa Koskelo =

Finnish volleyball player (born 1991)

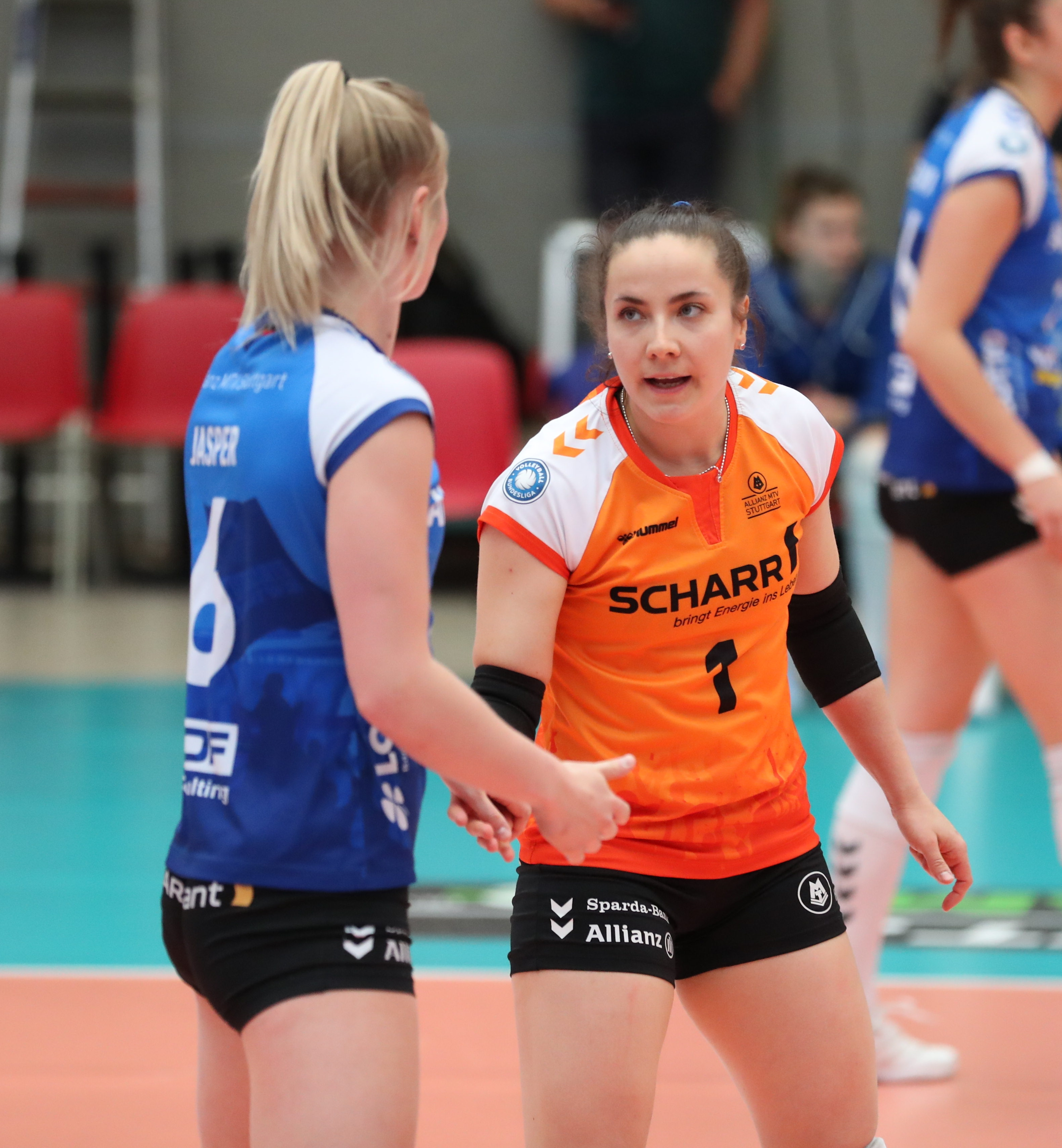

Personal information
- Nationality: Finnish
- Born: 20 August 1991 (age 35); Forssa
- Height: 1.65 cm (1 in)
- Weight: 66 kg (146 lb)
- Spike: 279 cm (110 in)
- Block: 264 cm (104 in)

Volleyball information
- Position: Libero
- Current club: (Germany) Allianz MTV Stuttgart
- Number: 1

Career
Years	Teams
2009-2012; 2012-2013; 2013-2016; 2016-2018; 2018-	(Finland) HPK Naiset (Finland) LP Kangasala (Finland) LP Viesti Salo (Slovenia) OK Nova KBM Branik Maribor (Germany) Allianz MTV Stuttgart

Roosa Koskelo (born 20 August 1991 in Forssa) is a Finnish volleyball player, and a member of the German club Allianz MTV Stuttgart.

== Sporting achievements ==
=== Clubs ===
Finland Championship:

- 2014, 2015
- 2010, 2012, 2013, 2016
- 2011

Finland Cup:

- 2012, 2014, 2015

Slovenia Cup:

- 2017, 2018

MEVZA League:

- 2017, 2018

Slovenia Championship:

- 2017, 2018

German Championship:

- 2019, 2022
- 2021

German Cup:

- 2022

CEV Cup:

- 2022
