= Adora Anae =

American volleyball player (born 1996)

Personal information
- Nationality: United States
- Born: October 1, 1996 (age 30)
- Home town: Punaluu, Hawaii, U.S.
- Education: University of Utah
- Height: 6 ft 2 in (1.88 m)

Volleyball information
- Position: Outside Hitter

Career
- Years: Team
- 2018–2020 2020–2021 2021–2022 2022 2022–2023 2024–2025 2025 2025: (South Korea) Hwaseong IBK Altos (Turkey) Bolu Bld (Puerto Rico) Criollas de Caguas (Ukraine) SC Prometey (Greece) Panathinaikos (United States) Orlando Valkyries (United States) Vegas Thrill (Vietnam) Hà Nội Tasco Auto (loan)

National team
- Years: Team
- 2018: United States
Medal record
Women's Volleyball
Representing the United States
Women's Pan-American Volleyball Cup
Gold medal – first place	2018 Santo Domingo

Adora Philomen Api'iena Anae (born October 1, 1996) is an American volleyball player who played for the Orlando Valkyries and Vegas Thrill of the Pro Volleyball Federation and the United States national team. She played college volleyball at Utah.

== Early life ==
Anae grew up in Laie, Hawaii and attended Kahuku High & Intermediate School, where she was a member of the basketball, soccer, and track teams.

== Career ==
=== Utah ===
During her collegiate career at Utah, Anae was an AVCA All-American selection in 2016 and 2017, AVCA Pacific South Region Player of the Year in 2017, All-Pac-12 selection in 2015, 2016, and 2017, and Pac-12 All-Freshman Team honoree in 2014. On October 8, 2017, Anae became the Utes all-time kills leader.

=== Professional clubs ===
In the 2018–19 season she signed her first professional contract, selected after a draft by the IBK Altos, in the South Korean V-League; after two years with the Asian team, she arrived in Turkey in the 2020-21 championship, playing in the cadet division with Bolu, gaining promotion to Sultanlar Ligi. She joined Criollas de Caguas in Puerto Rico, in May 2021, for the 2021 Liga de Voleibol Superior Femenino, winning the championship. She joined Prometej in the Ukrainian Superliha, but was forced to leave the club prematurely, due to the Russian invasion of Ukraine. In May 2022 she returned to Criollas de Caguas. She then joined Panathinaikos, in Greece, for the 2022-2023 season and won the championship. Anae played in the Pro Volleyball Federation for a season and a half (2024-2025) with the Orlando Valkyries before finishing the 2025 season with the Vegas Thrill.

=== USA National Team ===
Anae won a gold medal with Team USA at the 2018 Pan American Volleyball Cup.

== Personal life ==
Anae has five siblings and is of Cook Islander and Samoan descent. Her father Brad played college football at Hawaii and BYU before playing professionally in the USFL. Her older sister Pati played college volleyball at Portland State and the College of Southern Idaho. Her younger sister Bradina was member of the BYU track and field team. Her younger brother Bradlee played college football at Utah and professionally in the NFL and CFL.
