= List of Senior CLASS Award women's volleyball winners =

Senior CLASS Award for women's volleyball
- Awarded for: the outstanding senior NCAA Division I Student-Athlete of the Year in women's volleyball
- Country: United States
- Presented by: Premier Sports Management
- First award: 2010
- Currently held by: Sydney Hilley, Wisconsin
- Website: http://www.seniorclassaward.com/volleyball/

The Senior CLASS Award is presented each year to the outstanding senior NCAA Division I Student-Athlete of the Year in women's volleyball. The award was established in 2010 and the first award went to Ellie Blankenship of the Northern Iowa Panthers.

So far, no men's version of this award has been created. Three NCAA sports that are sponsored for both men and women have Senior CLASS Awards for only one sex—ice hockey and lacrosse do not have women's awards, and volleyball does not have a men's award.

Year	Winner	School
2010	Ellie Blankenship	Northern Iowa
2011	Kanani Danielson	Hawaii
2012	Gina Mancuso	Nebraska
2013	Ariel Scott	Penn State
2014	Liz McMahon	Illinois
2015	Cassie Strickland	Washington
2016	Paige Tapp	Minnesota
2017	Haleigh Washington	Penn State
2018	Mikaela Foecke	Nebraska
2019	Kathryn Plummer	Stanford
2020–21 (Note: Due to COVID-19 disruptions, the NCAA moved the D-I championship to spring 2021 from its originally intended fall 2020 schedule. It designated the championship tournament as the "2020" edition, but the season as "2020–21".)	Stephanie Samedy	Minnesota
2021	Sydney Hilley	Wisconsin

== See also ==
- List of sports awards honoring women
