= 2017 Women's Pan-American Volleyball Cup =

Tournament details
- Host country: Peru
- Dates: 17–25 June
- Teams: 12
- Venue: (in 2 host cities)

Final positions
- Champions: United States (5th title)

Tournament awards
- MVP: Micha Hancock (USA)

The 2017 Women's Pan-American Volleyball Cup was the 16th edition of the annual women's volleyball tournament. It was held in two cities, Lima and Cañete, in Peru from 17 June to 25 June. Twelve teams competed in the tournament.

The United States won the title when they defeated the Dominican Republic 3–1 in the final. American Micha Hancock was awarded the Most Valuable Player.

== Pools composition ==
Pool A	Pool B
Argentina	Canada
Colombia	Chile
Mexico	Cuba
Puerto Rico	Dominican Republic
United States	Peru
Venezuela	Trinidad and Tobago

== Venues ==
- Coliseo Eduardo Dibós, Lima
- Coliseo Lolo Fernández, Cañete

== Pool standing procedure ==
1. Number of matches won
2. Match points
3. Points ratio
4. Sets ratio
5. Result of the last match between the tied teams

Match won 3–0: 5 match points for the winner, 0 match points for the loser
Match won 3–1: 4 match points for the winner, 1 match point for the loser
Match won 3–2: 3 match points for the winner, 2 match points for the loser

== Preliminary round ==
- All times are Peru Standard Time (UTC−05:00)

=== Group A ===
Pos	Team	Pld	W	L	Pts	SPW	SPL	SPR	SW	SL	SR	Qualification
1	United States	5	5	0	23	415	301	1.379	15	2	7.500	Semifinals
2	Puerto Rico	5	4	1	21	426	362	1.177	14	4	3.500	Quarterfinals
3	Argentina	5	3	2	15	398	366	1.087	10	7	1.429	Quarterfinals
4	Colombia	5	2	3	8	367	376	0.976	6	11	0.545	
5	Venezuela	5	1	4	3	284	398	0.714	3	14	0.214	
6	Mexico	5	0	5	5	376	463	0.812	5	15	0.333	

- Venue: Coliseo Lolo Fernández, Cañete

Date	Time		Score		Set 1	Set 2	Set 3	Set 4	Set 5	Total	Report
17 Jun	15:00	Puerto Rico	3–0	Colombia	25–20	25–16	28–26			78–62	P2 P3
17 Jun	17:00	United States	3–0	Venezuela	25–9	25–16	25–11			75–36	P2 P3
17 Jun	19:00	Argentina	3–1	Mexico	25–22	25–20	23–25	25–21		98–88	P2 P3
18 Jun	15:00	Colombia	0–3	United States	8–25	19–25	27–29			54–79	P2 P3
18 Jun	17:00	Venezuela	0–3	Argentina	11–25	10–25	20–25			41–75	P2 P3
18 Jun	19:00	Mexico	0–3	Puerto Rico	18–25	21–25	15–25			54–75	P2 P3
19 Jun	15:00	Argentina	3–0	Colombia	25–22	26–24	26–24			77–70	P2 P3
19 Jun	17:00	Venezuela	3–2	Mexico	25–22	23–25	25–19	21–25	15–7	109–98	P2 P3
19 Jun	19:00	United States	3–2	Puerto Rico	25–23	25–23	23–25	21–25	15–12	109–108	P2 P3
20 Jun	15:00	Colombia	3–0	Venezuela	25–15	25–17	25–15			75–47	P2 P3
20 Jun	17:00	Mexico	0–3	United States	13–25	15–25	13–25			41–75	P2 P3
20 Jun	19:00	Puerto Rico	3–1	Argentina	15–25	25–19	25–21	25–21		90–86	P2 P3
21 Jun	15:00	Venezuela	0–3	Puerto Rico	14–25	21–25	16–25			51–75	P2 P3
21 Jun	17:00	Colombia	3–2	Mexico	23–25	18–25	25–16	25–20	15–9	106–95	P2 P3
21 Jun	19:00	Argentina	0–3	United States	25–27	14–25	23–25			62–77	P2 P3

=== Group B ===
Pos	Team	Pld	W	L	Pts	SPW	SPL	SPR	SW	SL	SR	Qualification
1	Dominican Republic	5	5	0	25	375	265	1.415	15	0	MAX	Semifinals
2	Peru	5	3	2	16	407	361	1.127	11	7	1.571	Quarterfinals
3	Cuba	5	3	2	14	356	331	1.076	9	7	1.286	Quarterfinals
4	Canada	5	3	2	14	383	363	1.055	10	8	1.250	
5	Trinidad and Tobago	5	1	4	6	328	385	0.852	4	12	0.333	
6	Chile	5	0	5	0	232	376	0.617	0	15	0.000	

- Venue: Coliseo Eduardo Dibós, Lima

Date	Time		Score		Set 1	Set 2	Set 3	Set 4	Set 5	Total	Report
17 Jun	15:00	Trinidad and Tobago	0–3	Dominican Republic	22–25	21–25	20–25			63–75	P2 P3
17 Jun	17:00	Canada	1–3	Cuba	25–21	20–25	10–25	22–25		77–96	P2 P3
17 Jun	19:00	Peru	3–0	Chile	25–13	25–13	25–12			75–38	P2 P3
18 Jun	14:00	Canada	3–0	Trinidad and Tobago	25–19	25–12	25–19			75–50	P2 P3
18 Jun	16:00	Chile	0–3	Dominican Republic	16–25	23–25	9–25			48–75	P2 P3
18 Jun	18:00	Peru	3–0	Cuba	25–19	25–17	25–21			75–57	P2 P3
19 Jun	15:00	Cuba	3–0	Chile	25–12	25–17	25–19			75–48	P2 P3
19 Jun	17:00	Dominican Republic	3–0	Canada	25–19	25–11	25–18			75–48	P2 P3
19 Jun	19:00	Peru	3–1	Trinidad and Tobago	25–19	24–26	25–21	25–17		99–83	P2 P3
20 Jun	15:00	Trinidad and Tobago	3–0	Chile	26–24	25–22	25–15			76–61	P2 P3
20 Jun	17:00	Dominican Republic	3–0	Cuba	25–16	25–17	25–20			75–53	P2 P3
20 Jun	19:00	Peru	2–3	Canada	25–21	25–19	22–25	17–25	16–18	105–108	P2 P3
21 Jun	15:00	Cuba	3–0	Trinidad and Tobago	25–14	25–21	25–21			75–56	P2 P3
21 Jun	17:00	Chile	0–3	Canada	16–25	12–25	9–25			37–75	P2 P3
21 Jun	19:00	Peru	0–3	Dominican Republic	19–25	16–25	18–25			53–75	P2 P3

== Final round ==
=== Championship bracket ===
Quarterfinals
B2	Peru	3
A3	Argentina	2
A2	Puerto Rico	3
B3	Cuba	0

Semifinals
A1	United States	3
B2	Peru	0
B1	Dominican Republic	3
A2	Puerto Rico	0

Finals
A1	United States	3
B1	Dominican Republic	1
Third place
B2	Peru	1
A2	Puerto Rico	3

=== 5th–10th places bracket ===
Classification 5–10
B4	Canada	3
A5	Venezuela	2
A4	Colombia	3
B5	Trinidad and Tobago	0

Classification 5–8
A3	Argentina	1
B4	Canada	3
B3	Cuba	3
A4	Colombia	1
Classification 9–10
B5	Trinidad and Tobago	3
A5	Venezuela	1

Classification 5–6
B4	Canada	1
B3	Cuba	3
Classification 7–8
A3	Argentina	2
A4	Colombia	3

=== 11th place ===
Date	Time		Score		Set 1	Set 2	Set 3	Set 4	Set 5	Total	Report
23 Jun	14:00	Mexico	3–0	Chile	25–19	25–17	25–17			75–53	P2 P3

=== 7th–10th classification ===
Date	Time		Score		Set 1	Set 2	Set 3	Set 4	Set 5	Total	Report
23 Jun	16:00	Colombia	3–0	Trinidad and Tobago	25–19	25–22	25–17			75–58	P2 P3
23 Jun	18:00	Canada	3–2	Venezuela	21–25	22–25	25–17	25–22	15–10	108–99	P2 P3

=== Quarterfinals ===
Date	Time		Score		Set 1	Set 2	Set 3	Set 4	Set 5	Total	Report
23 Jun	17:00	Puerto Rico	3–0	Cuba	25–23	25–22	25–17			75–62	P2 P3
23 Jun	19:00	Peru	3–2	Argentina	20–25	25–21	20–25	25–19	15–9	105–99	P2 P3

=== 9th place ===
Date	Time		Score		Set 1	Set 2	Set 3	Set 4	Set 5	Total	Report
24 Jun	16:00	Trinidad and Tobago	3–1	Venezuela	25–22	25–17	19–25	25–18		94–82	P2 P3

=== 5th–8th classification ===
Date	Time		Score		Set 1	Set 2	Set 3	Set 4	Set 5	Total	Report
24 Jun	18:00	Colombia	1–3	Cuba	15–25	22–25	25–18	21–25		83–93	P2 P3
24 Jun	20:00	Canada	3–1	Argentina	28–26	22–25	25–22	25–19		100–92	P2 P3

=== Semifinals ===
Date	Time		Score		Set 1	Set 2	Set 3	Set 4	Set 5	Total	Report
24 Jun	17:00	Dominican Republic	3–0	Puerto Rico	25–18	25–21	25–19			75–58	P2 P3
24 Jun	19:00	United States	3–0	Peru	25–14	25–17	27–25			77–56	P2 P3

=== 7th place ===
Date	Time		Score		Set 1	Set 2	Set 3	Set 4	Set 5	Total	Report
25 Jun	15:00	Colombia	3–2	Argentina	25–11	21–25	25–19	20–25	15–7	106–87	P2 P3

=== 5th place ===
Date	Time		Score		Set 1	Set 2	Set 3	Set 4	Set 5	Total	Report
25 Jun	17:00	Cuba	3–1	Canada	25–19	23–25	25–17	25–22		98–83	P2 P3

=== 3rd place ===
Date	Time		Score		Set 1	Set 2	Set 3	Set 4	Set 5	Total	Report
25 Jun	15:00	Peru	1–3	Puerto Rico	22–25	25–13	25–27	15–25		87–90	P2 P3

=== Final ===
Date	Time		Score		Set 1	Set 2	Set 3	Set 4	Set 5	Total	Report
25 Jun	17:00	United States	3–1	Dominican Republic	25–16	19–25	25–20	25–23		94–84	P2 P3

== Final standing ==
Rank	Team
1st place, gold medalist(s)	United States
2nd place, silver medalist(s)	Dominican Republic
3rd place, bronze medalist(s)	Puerto Rico
4	Peru
5	Cuba
6	Canada
7	Colombia
8	Argentina
9	Trinidad and Tobago
10	Venezuela
11	Mexico
12	Chile

2017 Women's Pan-American Cup

United States
5th title

14-woman roster
Hancock, Alhassan, Wong-Orantes, Rolfzen, Carlini, Kingdon, Drews, Bartsch-Hackley,
McCage, Courtney, Newcombe, Benson, Tapp, McMahon
Head Coach
Karch Kiraly

== Individual awards ==
- Most valuable player
  (United States) Micha Hancock
- Best setter
  (United States) Micha Hancock
- Best Outside Hitters
  (Cuba) Regla Gracia
  (Dominican Republic) Bethania de la Cruz
- Best Middle Blockers
  (Trinidad and Tobago) Sinead Jack
  (Argentina) Natalia Aispurúa
- Best Opposite
  (United States) Elizabeth McMahon
- Best scorer
  (Cuba) Heidy Casanova
- Best server
  (United States) Micha Hancock
- Best libero
  (Peru) Mirian Patiño
- Best digger
  (Dominican Republic) Brenda Castillo
- Best receiver
  (Peru) Mirian Patiño
