= Norwegian Women's Volleyball League =

Women's volleyball competition in Norway

Mizunoligaen
- Current season, competition or edition: 2025–26 Volleyball Mizunoligaen
- Sport: Volleyball
- Founded: 1973
- First season: 1973
- Administrator: NVBF
- No. of teams: 9 (2025–26)
- Country: Norway
- Continent: Europe
- Most recent champion: TIF Viking (1st title)
- Most titles: Koll Volleyball (14 titles)
- Level on pyramid: 1
- Relegation to: 2nd League
- Domestic cups: Norway Cup; Norway Super Cup
- International cups: CEV Champions League; CEV Cup; CEV Challenge Cup
- Website: http://www.volleyball.no/

The Norwegian Women's Volleyball League is a women's volleyball competition which has existed since 1973. It is organized by the Norwegian Volleyball Federation (Norges Volleyballforbund, NVBF).

== History ==
Teams participated in the 2024/25 Eliteserien Championship: IL Koll, Randaberg IL, KFUM Volda, Førde, NTNUI, TIF Viking, Oslo Volley, ToppVolley Norge, ØKSIL. The championship title was won by TIF Viking, who won the finals by beating IL Koll 3-2. 3rd place went to ØKSIL.

=== List of Champions ===
Years	(gold) Gold	(silver) Silver	(bronze) Bronze
1973	Norges Idrettsh.sk.	St. Svithun gymn.	KSI
1974	BSI Volleyball	Ålesund	NIHI
1975	KSI	BSI Volleyball	Sandnes
1976	Ålesund	NIHI	BSI Volleyball
1977	KSI	BSI Volleyball	Ålesund
1978	NIHI	KSI	BSI Volleyball
1979	BSI Volleyball	KSI	St. Svithun
1980	BSI Volleyball	KSI	Sandnes
1981	BSI Volleyball	NIHI	Ålesund
1982	BSI Volleyball	Tambarskjelvar	Oslo
1983	BSI Volleyball	Oslo	Sortland VBK
1984	Sortland VBK	Oslo	Bergkameratene
1985	Bergkameratene	KFUM/Oslo	BSI Volleyball
1986	KFUM/Oslo	Bergkameratene	BSI Volleyball
1987	BSI Volleyball	Bergkameratene	
1988	KFUM/Oslo	Bergkameratene	
1989	Bergkameratene	KFUM/Oslo	
1990	Sandnes	Harstad	
1991	IL Koll	BSI Volleyball	
1992	Sandnes	BSI Volleyball	
1993	IL Koll	Sandnes	Blindheim
1994	IL Koll	Klepp	Harstad
1995	IL Koll	Fyllingen	Klepp
1996	Klepp	IL Koll	Harstad
1997	Klepp	IL Koll	Fyllingen
1998	Klepp	KFUM/Oslo	Aukra
1999	Klepp	IL Koll	KFUM/Oslo
2000	IL Koll	Klepp	Oslo Volley
2001	IL Koll	Klepp	Aukra
2002	Klepp	NTNUI Gløshaugen	IL Koll
2003	IL Koll	NTNUI Gløshaugen	KFUM Stavanger
2004	IL Koll	Tromsø Volley	NTNUI Gløshaugen
2005	IL Koll	NTNUI Gløshaugen	Oslo Volley
2006	IL Koll	Oslo Volley	BSI Volleyball
2007	IL Koll	Oslo Volley	BSI Volleyball
2008	IL Koll	Oslo Volley	BSI Volleyball
2009	IL Koll	Oslo Volley	BSI Volleyball
2010	UiS Stavanger	IL Koll	BSI Volleyball
2011	UiS Stavanger	Oslo Volley	IL Koll
2012	Stod Volley	Oslo Volley	BSI Volleyball
2013	Oslo Volley	Stod Volley	BSI Volleyball
2014	Stod Volley	Oslo Volley	Førde VBK
2015	Stod Volley	Oslo Volley	Randaberg IL
2016	Randaberg IL	Oslo Volley	ToppVolley Norge
2017	Randaberg IL	Oslo Volley	ToppVolley Norge
2018	Førde VBK	ToppVolley Norge	Oslo Volley
2019	ToppVolley Norge	Førde VBK	Oslo Volley
2020	Koll IL	Randaberg IL	BK Tromsø
2021	BK Tromsø	Randaberg IL	Koll IL
2022	BK Tromsø	Randaberg IL	Koll IL
2023	Randaberg IL	Koll IL	TIF Viking
2024	Randaberg IL	Koll IL	TIF Viking
2025	TIF Viking	Koll IL	ØKSIL

== Table by club ==
rk.	Club	Titles	Location	Years Won
1	Koll Volleyball	14	Oslo	1991, (1993—1995), (2000—2001), (2003—2009), 2020
2	BSI Volleyball	7	Bergen	1974, (1979—1983), 1987
3	Klepp	5	Kleppe	(1996—1999), 2002
4	Randaberg IL	4	Randaberg	(2016—2017), (2023—2024)
5	Stod Volley	3	Steinkjer	2012, (2014—2015)
6	NIHI	2	Oslo	1973, 1978
=	KSI	2	Kristiansand	1975, 1977
=	Bergkameratene	2	Kongsberg	1985, 1989
=	KFUM/Oslo	2	Oslo	1986, 1988
=	Sandnes	2	Sandnes	1990, 1992
=	UiS Volley	2	Stavanger	(2010—2011)
=	BK Tromsø	2	Tromsø	(2021—2022)
13	Ålesund	1	Ålesund	1976
=	Sortland VBK	1	Sortland	1984
=	Oslo Volley	1	Oslo	2013
=	Førde VBK	1	Førde	2018
=	ToppVolley Norge	1	Suldal	2019
=	TIF Viking	1	Bergenhus	2025
