= Rote Raben Vilsbiburg =

German women's volleyball team

- Founded: 1971
- Last season: Bundesliga-Fünfter, Playoff-Viertelfinale
- Association: German Volleyball Association
- League: German Women's Volleyball League
- Location: Seyboldsdorfer Str. 20; 84137 Vilsbiburg
- Ballpark: Ball sports hall
- Head coach: Florian Völker
- Manager: André Wehnert
- Championships: 2005, 2006 Deutscher Vizemeister; 2008 Deutscher Meister; 2009 DVV-Pokalsieger; 2009 Deutscher Vizemeister; 2010 Deutscher Meister; 2012 DVV-Pokalfinalist; 2014 DVV-Pokalsieger; 2014 Deutscher Vizemeister
- Assistant Coaches: Rebekka Maria Schneider, Andreas Häußler, Akis Efstathopoulos
- Website: roteraben.de

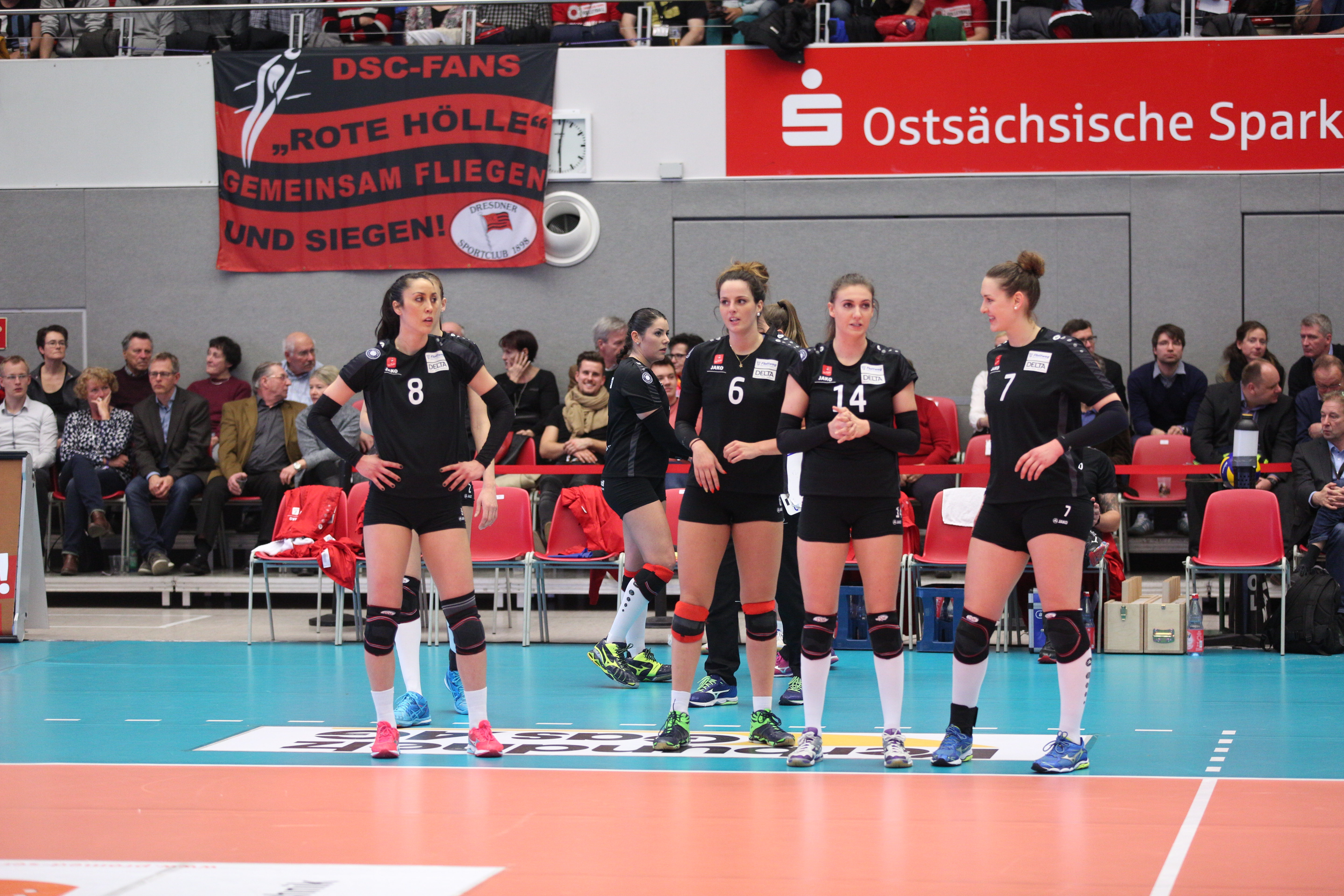
RRV in 2017

Rote Raben Vilsbiburg (Red Ravens) is a German women's volleyball team based in Vilsbiburg, Bavaria. The team competes in the Bundesliga, and has been national champion two times (2008, 2010) and DVV-Pokal cup winner two times (2009, 2014).

== Players ==
- Yeisy Soto
- Jeannette Huskic
- Cayetana Lopez
- Jana Gärtner
- Pauline Martin
- Irene Ramos
- Alondra Vazquez
- Dayana Segovia
- Neira Ortiz
- Alba Hernandez
- Lourdes Tamis
- Monika Salkute
- Diana Vavrek
