= German Women's Volleyball Super Cup =

- Current season, competition or edition: 2023
- Sport: Volleyball
- Founded: 1988
- No. of teams: 2
- Country: Germany
- Most recent champion: Allianz MTV Stuttgart

The German Women's Volleyball Supercup is a women's volleyball competition between the champion of Germany and the winner of the Cup of Germany . The first edition of this competition was contested in the 1988 season.

== Winners list ==
Years	Champions	Score	Runners-up
1988	VF Bayern Lohhof		CJD Feuerbach
1990	SC Dynamo Berlin		CJD Feuerbach
1992	USC Münster		
2002	Dresdner SC		Schweriner SC
2016	Allianz MTV Stuttgart	3 – 1 (25-20, 25–23, 24–26, 25–20)	Dresdner SC
2017	SSC Palmberg Schwerin	3 – 0 (25-17, 25–14, 25–18)	Allianz MTV Stuttgart
2018	SSC Palmberg Schwerin	3 – 1 (25-17, 25–23, 24–26, 25–18)	Dresdner SC
2019	SSC Palmberg Schwerin	3 – 1 (25-22, 31–33, 25–19, 25–18)	Allianz MTV Stuttgart
2020	SSC Palmberg Schwerin	3 – 0 (25-23, 27–25, 25–21)	Dresdner SC
2021	Dresdner SC	3 – 2 (25-17, 25–18, 17–25, 18–25, 15–10)	SSC Palmberg Schwerin
2022	SC Potsdam	3 – 1 (25-20, 25–15, 20–25, 25–16)	Allianz MTV Stuttgart
2023	Allianz MTV Stuttgart	3 – 1 (27-25, 21–25, 25–17, 25–21)	SSC Palmberg Schwerin

== Honours by club ==
Rk.	Club	Titles	City	Years won
1	SSC Palmberg Schwerin	4	Schwerin	2017, 2018, 2019, 2020
2	Dresdner SC	2	Dresdner	2002, 2021
3	Allianz MTV Stuttgart	2	Stuttgart	2016, 2023
=	VF Bayern Lohhof	1	Lohhof	1988
=	SC Dynamo Berlin	1	Berlin	1990
=	USC Münster	1	Münster	1992
=	SC Potsdam	1	Potsdam	2022
