= Allianz MTV Stuttgart =

German volleyball team

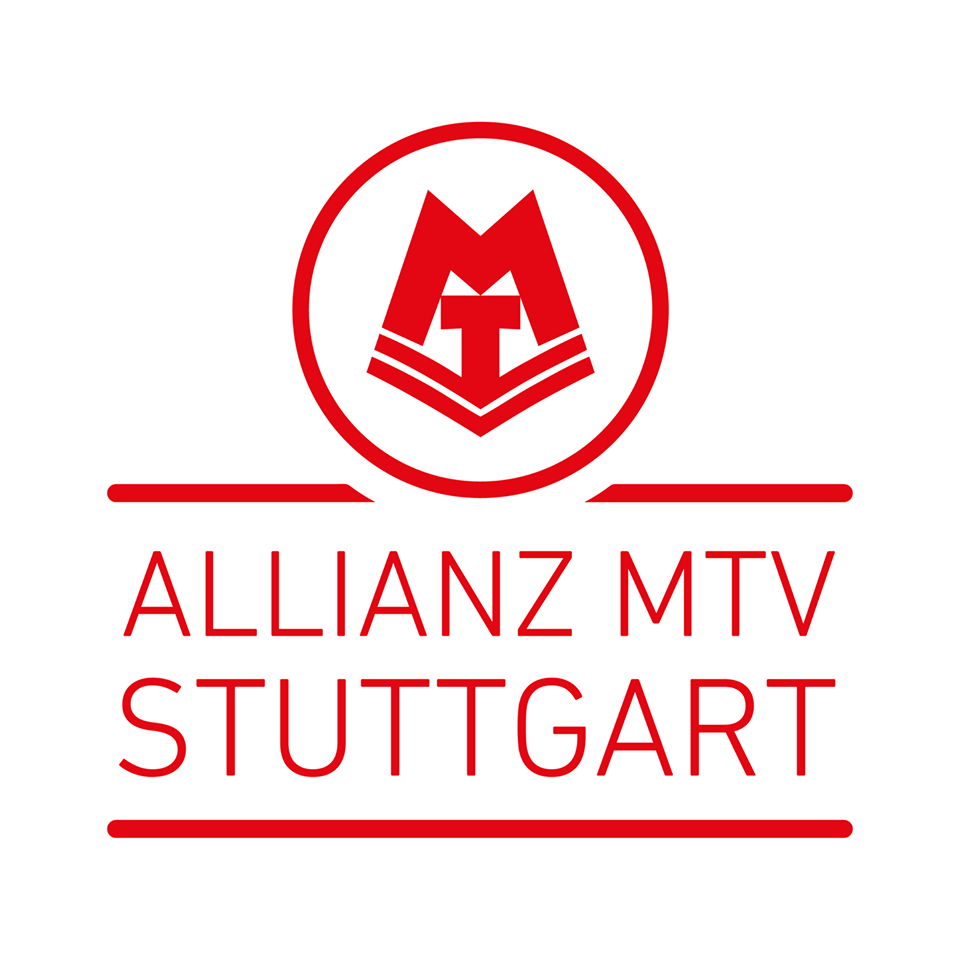
- Short name: VC Stuttgart
- Founded: 2007
- Ground: Scharrena Stuttgart (Capacity: 2,019)
- Manager: Konstantin Bitter
- Captain: Roosa Koskelo
- League: German Women's Volleyball League
- 2021-22: 1st
- Website: Club home page

Uniforms
Home	Away

Allianz MTV Stuttgart is a German professional volleyball team based in Stuttgart, Baden-Württemberg.

== History ==
The club was founded in 2007 following a merger between the volleyball departments of MTV Stuttgart and TSV Georgii-Allianz Stuttgart. Initially named "VC Stuttgart", the team debuted in the Bundesliga in the 2008–09 season. In 2010, the team became known as "Smart Allianz Stuttgart", later changing to its current name, Allianz MTV Stuttgart, in 2012.

In 2013, the club's youth program was integrated into the MTV Stuttgart Volleyball Academy, which functions as a recognized federal training base (Bundesstützpunkt) for top-level development.

In 2020, sports director was Kim Renkema whereas managing director was Aurel Irion.

For the 2020-21 season, Stuttgart re-hired Athina Papafotiou and also kept Krystal Rivers who had been an important building block. Further, the Dutch girl Hester Jasper (18) joined from German Women's Volleyball League competitor VfB Suhl. The attacker signed a two-year contract. Yet, Stuttgart had to cope with the departure of Annie Cesar, who left to get more playing time.

As of 2021, the head coach has been Tore Aleksandersen who replaced 2020 coach Giannis Athanasopoulos.

In the 2023–24 season, the team achieved the domestic treble—winning the Bundesliga, DVV-Pokal, and Supercup in the same year. The team has also regularly competed in the CEV Women's Champions League.

== Home Venue ==
The team plays at SCHARRena Stuttgart, a modern indoor arena located in Stuttgart-Bad Cannstatt. The facility has a capacity of approximately 2,000 and has hosted both domestic and international volleyball competitions.

== Titles and accomplishments ==
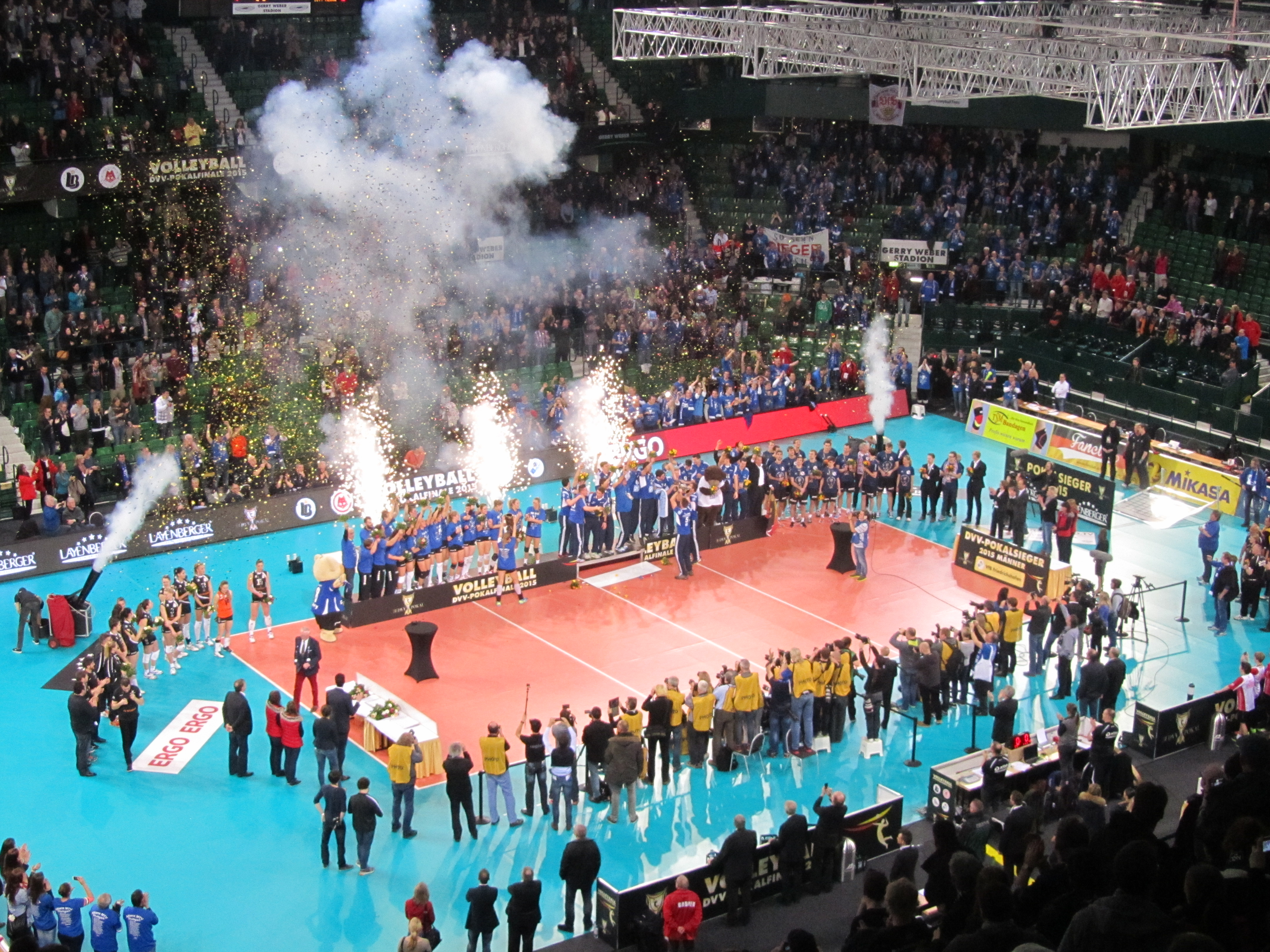
Stuttgart (on the left) wins 2015 German Cup

=== National competitions ===
- German Women's Volleyball League
  - Gold: 2018–19, 2021–22
  - Silver: 2014–15, 2015–16, 2016–17, 2017–18, 2020–21
- German Women's Volleyball Cup
  - Gold: 2011, 2015, 2017, 2022
- German Women's Volleyball Supercup
  - Gold: 2016

=== International competitions ===
- Women's CEV Cup
  - Silver: 2021–22

== Team roster 2025–26 ==
As of July 2025.

No.	Name	Country	Date of Birth	Position
1	Roosa Koskelo	(Finland)	20 August 1991	Libero
13	Krystal Rivers	(United States)	23 May 1994	Opposite
Head coach	Konstantin Bitter	(Germany)		
Assistant Coach	Per-Erik Dalqvist	(Sweden)		
Assistant Coach	Kiyarash Maleki	(Iran)		

== Notable players ==
- Krystal Rivers – One of the club’s standout players since 2018, consistently among the top scorers in the league and MVP in multiple seasons.
- Roosa Koskelo – Finnish libero and team captain during the 2021–2023 seasons.
- Athina Papafotiou – Greek setter, returned to the club for the 2020–21 season.
- Britt Bongaerts
- Maria Segura Pallerés
- Emilie Olimstead
- Celine Van Gestel
- Sarka Barborkova

== Youth Development ==
The club operates the Volleyballakademie Stuttgart, which collaborates with regional and national sports bodies to support talented youth athletes.

== See also ==
- German Women's Volleyball League
- Volleyball in Germany
