= German Volleyball Association =

Governing body of volleyball in Germany

- Sport: Volleyball; Beach volleyball
- Jurisdiction: Germany
- Abbreviation: DVV
- Founded: 1955
- Affiliation: FIVB
- Affiliation date: 1957
- Regional affiliation: CEV
- Headquarters: Frankfurt am Main
- Location: Germany
- President: Markus Dieckmann

Official website
- www.volleyball-verband.de
- (Germany)

The German Volleyball Association (DVV) or in (German: Deutscher Volleyball-Verband) is the governing body for volleyball in the Federal Republic of Germany. The DVV is a member of the International Volleyball Federation (FIVB), the European Volleyball Confederation (CEV) and it is associated with the German Olympic Sports Confederation (DOSB). It has an active 7,009 sport societies and 408,863 registered members.

It organizes the men's and women's volleyball championships in Germany and it manages and organizes all the activities of the men's and women's national teams from seniors to under-age categories. DVV also is responsible for all activities in beach volleyball in Germany.
