= German Women's Volleyball League =

Women's Volleyball Bundesliga
- Current season, competition or edition: 2024–25 Women's Volleyball Bundesliga
- Sport: Volleyball
- Founded: 1976; 50 years ago
- No. of teams: 12
- Country: Germany
- Confederation: CEV
- Continent: Europe
- Most recent champion: VC Stuttgart (4th title) (2023–24)
- Most titles: Hannover VC (18 titles)
- Broadcaster: Sport 1
- Relegation to: 2. Bundesliga
- Domestic cups: German Cup; German Super Cup
- International cups: CEV Champions League; CEV Cup; CEV Challenge Cup
- Website: volleyball-bundesliga.de

The German Women's volleyball League or in (German : Volleyball-Bundesliga der Frauen) is the highest division in German women's volleyball. The German champion has been determined in this competition since the 1976/77 season.

== Current mode ==
The women's Bundesliga is made up of 11 teams in the 2018/19 season. The last placed teams after the main round descends into the second division . The teams in the first eight places are qualified for the playoffs. Except for the playoff final ( best-of-five mode ), all games were first played in best-of-three mode . In the season 2018/19 the first time the semi-finals in the best-of-five mode was held.

== History ==
The 2019/20 season was canceled on March 12, 2020, due to the COVID-19 pandemic before the final round of the main-round. A championship title was not awarded, there were also no relegations. It was the first time in the history of the Volleyball Bundesliga that a season ended prematurely.

== Media ==
Since the 2013/14 season there have been regular live broadcasts on the Internet of the matches of the First Bundesliga. The clubs will contribute 100,000 EUR to the production costs. The transfer of around 40 games is planned. During the main round, a top game is to be broadcast every week. In the play-offs, a game is to be shown live on every match day. SPORT1 has been broadcasting some games on free-to-air television since the 2017/18 season.

== Viewers ==
The record number of spectators in the Women's volleyball Bundesliga was set on April 30, 2016, by the play-off game between Allianz MTV Stuttgart and Dresdner SC. 5,392 spectators watched the game in the Stuttgart Porsche Arena, which Allianz MTV Stuttgart won 3–2. In second place in the list of the best of the audience follows the final game of the CJD Feuerbach against Bayern Lohhof in the Sindelfingen glass palace in 1987 with 5,000 spectators. In 2005 USC Münster played against the Rote Raben Vilsbiburg in front of a crowd of 4,500, third place on the leaderboard.

== Strongest Women's League of Germany ==
Measured by the number of spectators at home games, the Women's volleyball Bundesliga occupies a special position among team sports in Germany. In no other sport is the women's league stronger than the men's league. Of all professional leagues in Germany, Women's Volleyball Bundesliga has the highest audience average, even ahead of women in football, handball or basketball.

Germany - Women's Division 1 - DVL - Prize list since 1956/1957

Season	Champion	2nd Place	3rd Place
2023/2024	MTV Stuttgart	Schweriner SC	
2022/2023	MTV Stuttgart	SC Potsdam	
2021/2022	MTV Stuttgart	SC Potsdam	
2020/2021	Dresdner SC	MTV Stuttgart	
2019/2020	Event cancelled		
2018/2019	MTV Stuttgart	Schweriner SC	
2017/2018	Schweriner SC	MTV Stuttgart	
2016/2017	Schweriner SC	MTV Stuttgart	
2015/2016	Dresdner SC	MTV Stuttgart	Schweriner SC
2014/2015	Dresdner SC	MTV Stuttgart	Schweriner SC
2013/2014	Dresdner SC	Rote Raben Vilsbiburg	Wiesbaden VC
2012/2013	Schweriner SC	Dresdner SC	Rote Raben Vilsbiburg
2011/2012	Schweriner SC	Dresdner SC	Rote Raben Vilsbiburg
2010/2011	Schweriner SC	Dresdner SC	Rote Raben Vilsbiburg
2009/2010	Rote Raben Vilsbiburg	Wiesbaden VC	Schweriner SC
2008/2009	Schweriner SC	Rote Raben Vilsbiburg	Dresdner SC
2007/2008	Rote Raben Vilsbiburg	Dresdner SC	Schweriner SC
2006/2007	Dresdner SC	Schweriner SC	VfB 91 Suhl
2005/2006	Schweriner SC	Rote Raben Vilsbiburg	Dresdner SC
2004/2005	USC Münster	Rote Raben Vilsbiburg	Dresdner SC
2003/2004	USC Münster	Bayer 04 Leverkusen	Schweriner SC
2002/2003	SSV Ulm 1846	USC Münster	VT Aurubis Hamburg
2001/2002	Schweriner SC	Dresdner SC	DJK Karbach
2000/2001	Schweriner SC	USC Münster	DJK Karbach
1999/2000	Schweriner SC	USC Münster	DJK Karbach
1998/1999	Dresdner SC	Bayer 04 Leverkusen	DJK Karbach
1997/1998	Schweriner SC	USC Münster	CJD Berlin
1996/1997	USC Münster	Schweriner SC	DJK Karbach
1995/1996	USC Münster	CJD Berlin	Schweriner SC
1994/1995	Schweriner SC	USC Münster	CJD Berlin
1993/1994	CJD Berlin	Schweriner SC	USC Münster
1992/1993	CJD Berlin	USC Münster	Schweriner SC
1991/1992	USC Münster	CJD Feuerbach	CJD Berlin
1990/1991	CJD Feuerbach	USC Münster	SV Lohhof
1989/1990	CJD Feuerbach	SV Lohhof	USC Münster
1988/1989	CJD Feuerbach		
1987/1988	SV Lohhof		
1986/1987	SV Lohhof		
1985/1986	SV Lohhof		
1984/1985	Viktoria Augsburg		
1983/1984	SV Lohhof		
1982/1983	SV Lohhof		
1981/1982	SV Lohhof		
1980/1981	USC Münster		
1979/1980	USC Münster		
1978/1979	Schwerte VC		
1977/1978	Schwerte VC		
1976/1977	USC Münster		
1975/1976	Hannover VC		
1974/1975	Hannover VC		
1973/1974	USC Münster		
1972/1973	Hannover VC		
1971/1972	Hannover VC		
1970/1971	Hannover VC		
1969/1970	Hannover VC		
1968/1969	Hannover VC		
1967/1968	Hannover VC		
1966/1967	Hannover VC		
1965/1966	Hannover VC		
1964/1965	Hannover VC		
1963/1964	Hannover VC		
1962/1963	Hannover VC		
1961/1962	Hannover VC		
1960/1961	Hannover VC		
1959/1960	Hannover VC		
1958/1959	Hannover VC		
1957/1958	Hannover VC		
1956/1957	PH Hannover		

== Teams ==
The following teams compete in the Bundesliga during 2020-21 season:

Teams of the Volleyball Bundesliga (women) 2020/21
- Ladies in Black Aachen
- Dresdner SC
- Black and White Erfurt
- USC Münster
- SC Potsdam
- SSC Palmberg Schwerin
- NawaRo Straubing
- Allianz MTV Stuttgart
- VfB Suhl Lotto Thuringia
- Rote Raben Vilsbiburg
- 1. VC Wiesbaden

== All-time team records ==
Since 1956/57:

Team	Victories	First Victory	Last Victory
Hannover VC	18	1957/1958	1975/1976
Schweriner SC	12	1994/1995	2017/2018
USC Münster	9	1973/1974	2004/2005
SV Lohhof	6	1981/1982	1987/1988
Dresdner SC	6	1998/1999	2020/2021
CJD Feuerbach	3	1988/1989	1990/1991
CJD Berlin	2	1992/1993	1993/1994
Schwerte VC	2	1977/1978	1978/1979
Rote Raben Vilsbiburg	2	2007/2008	2009/2010
MTV Stuttgart	2	2018/2019	2021/2022
SSV Ulm 1846	1	2002/2003	2002/2003
Viktoria Augsburg	1	1984/1985	1984/1985
PH Hannover	1	1956/1957	1956/1957

Since 2015/16:

Number of appearances
1	Dresdner SC	7
2	Ladies in Black Aachen	7
3	MTV Stuttgart	7
4	Rote Raben Vilsbiburg	7
5	SC Potsdam	7
6	Schweriner SC	7
7	USC Münster	7
8	VfB 91 Suhl	7
9	Wiesbaden VC	7
10	Schwarz-Weiß Erfurt	6

Number of matches
1	MTV Stuttgart	123
2	Schweriner SC	117
3	Dresdner SC	111
4	Ladies in Black Aachen	104
5	SC Potsdam	103
6	USC Münster	101
7	Wiesbaden VC	100
8	Rote Raben Vilsbiburg	97
9	VfB 91 Suhl	90
10	VCO Berlin	88

Wins
1	Schweriner SC	99
2	MTV Stuttgart	93
3	Dresdner SC	80
4	Wiesbaden VC	58
5	SC Potsdam	53
6	USC Münster	53
7	Ladies in Black Aachen	48
8	Rote Raben Vilsbiburg	48
9	VfB 91 Suhl	23
10	Köpenicker SC	20

Number of wins in games played
1	Schweriner SC	85 %
2	MTV Stuttgart	76 %
3	Dresdner SC	72 %
4	Wiesbaden VC	58 %
5	USC Münster	52 %
6	SC Potsdam	51 %
7	Rote Raben Vilsbiburg	49 %
8	Ladies in Black Aachen	46 %
9	TV Fischbek	46 %
10	FTSV Straubing	42 %

(Based on W=2 pts and D=1 pts)

	Team	S	Firs	Best	Pts	MP	W	L	GF	GA	diff
1	Schweriner SC	7	2015/2016	1st	216	117	99	18	321	112	+209
2	MTV Stuttgart	7	2015/2016	1st	216	123	93	30	310	143	+167
3	Dresdner SC	7	2015/2016	1st	191	111	80	31	274	135	+139
4	Wiesbaden VC	7	2015/2016	-	158	100	58	42	206	183	+23
5	SC Potsdam	7	2015/2016	-	156	103	53	50	208	200	+8
6	USC Münster	7	2015/2016	-	154	101	53	48	195	187	+8
7	Ladies in Black Aachen	7	2015/2016	-	152	104	48	56	186	197	-11
8	Rote Raben Vilsbiburg	7	2015/2016	-	145	97	48	49	180	176	+4
9	VfB 91 Suhl	7	2015/2016	-	113	90	23	67	98	218	-120
10	VCO Berlin	4	2015/2016	-	89	88	1	87	41	263	-222
11	Schwarz-Weiß Erfurt	6	2016/2017	-	73	64	9	55	53	175	-122
12	Köpenicker SC	2	2015/2016	-	72	52	20	32	87	116	-29
13	TV Fischbek	1	2015/2016	-	35	24	11	13	41	52	-11
14	FTSV Straubing	1	2015/2016	-	34	24	10	14	42	49	-7
15	NawaRo Straubing	4	2018/2019	-	27	22	5	17	22	55	-33
16	VT Aurubis Hamburg	1	2015/2016	-	2	2	0	2	3	6	-3

== See also ==
- German Women's Volleyball Cup
- German Women's Volleyball Super Cup
- Deutsche Volleyball-Bundesliga
