= German Women's Volleyball Cup =

Volleyball in Germany

- Sport: Volleyball
- Founded: 1973
- First season: 1973
- Administrator: DVV
- Country: Germany
- Continent: Europe
- Most recent champion: Allianz MTV Stuttgart (4th title)
- Most titles: USC Münster (11 titles)
- Broadcaster: Sport 1
- Streaming partner: Dyn / Twitch
- Website: DVV-Pokal.de

The DVV-Pokal für Frauen is the national cup competition of German women's volleyball . The organizer is the German Volleyball Association (DVV). The finals have been held in the SAP Arena in Mannheim since 2016. The current title holders in 2021 are the Schweriner SC.

== Competition history ==
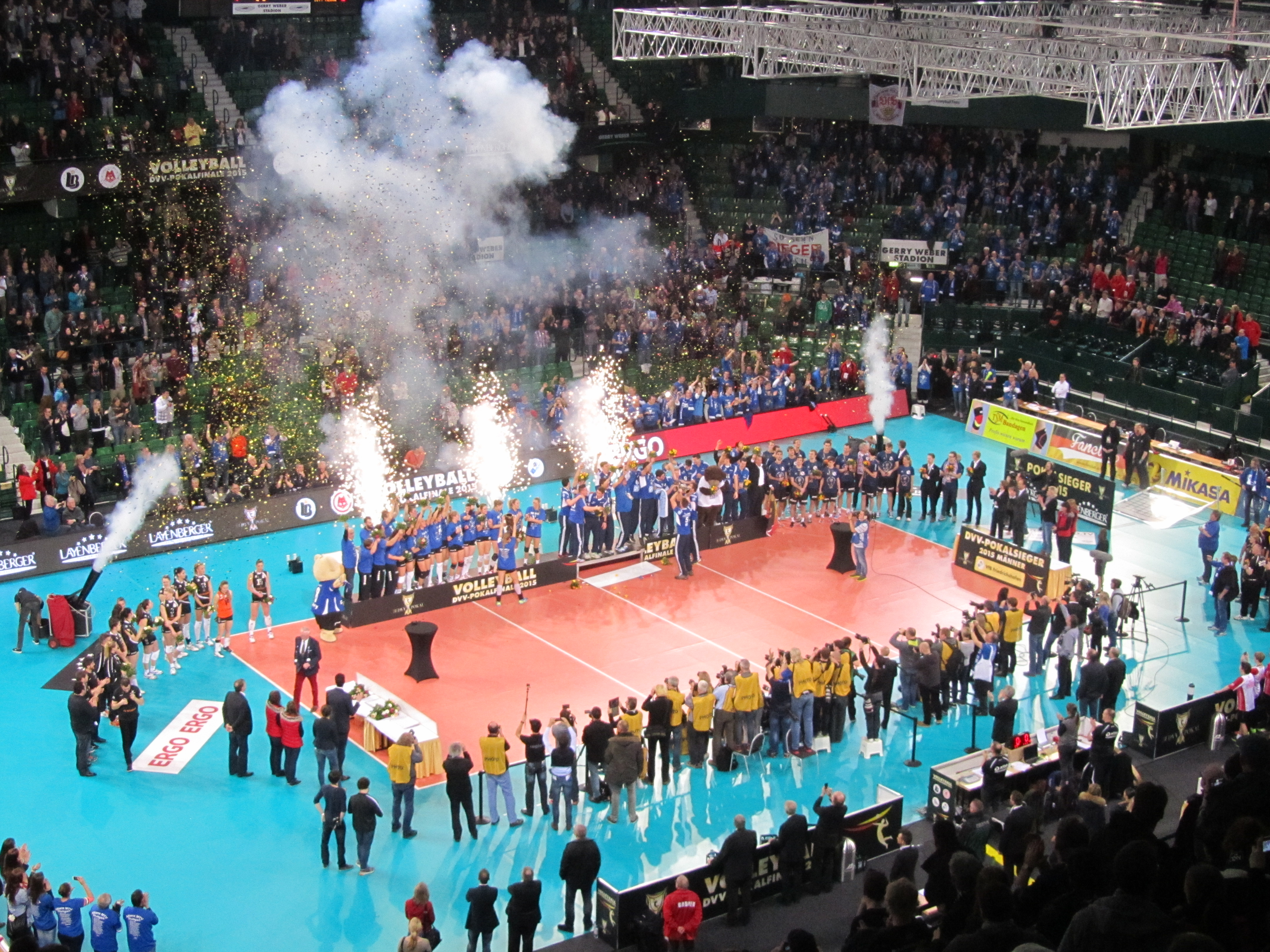
Award ceremony at the 2015 cup final in the Gerry Weber Stadium

The DVV Cup has been held since 1973. Its East German counterpart was the FDGB Cup under the direction of the German Sports Association Volleyball of the GDR (DSVB), which was held between 1953 and 1991.

From 2006 to 2015 the finals took place in the Gerry Weber Stadium in Halle. In April 2015, the DVV announced that there was a new venue. Since February 28, 2016, the finals have been held in the SAP Arena in Mannheim. In March 2018, the German Volleyball Association, the Volleyball Bundesliga and the operators of the SAP Arena agreed to extend the two-year contract by two more years until 2020. The contract, which expires in 2020, was again extended to at least 2025.

== List of champions ==
Years	Champions	Score	Runners-up
1973	USC Münster		
1974	USC Münster		
1975	USC Münster		
1976	USC Münster		
1977	1. VC Schwerte		
1978	1. VC Schwerte		
1979	USC Münster		
1980	1. VC Schwerte		
1981	TG 1862 Rüsselsheim		
1982	SV Lohhof		
1983	SV Lohhof		
1984	SV Lohhof		
1985	TG Viktoria Augsburg		
1986	SV Lohhof		
1987	SG/JDZ Feuerbach		
1988	CJD Feuerbach		
1989	CJD Feuerbach		
1990	CJD Feuerbach		
1991	USC Münster		
1992	CJD Berlin		
1993	CJD Berlin		
1994	CJD Berlin		
1995	CJD Berlin		
1996	USC Münster		
1997	USC Münster		
1998	VEW Telnet Schwerte		
1999	Dresdner SC		
2000	USC Münster		
2001	Schweriner SC		
2002	Dresdner SC		NA. Hamburg
2003	SSV Ulm Aliud Pharma		USC Münster
2004	USC Münster	3 – 2 (17-25, 20–25, 25–14, 25–21, 15–8)	NA. Hamburg
2005	USC Münster	3 – 0 (25-19, 25–23, 25–19)	Bayer 04 Leverkusen
2006	Schweriner SC	3 – 0 (25-19, 26–24, 25–23)	USC Münster
2007	Schweriner SC	3 – 1 (25-17, 25–21, 17–25, 25–17)	Dresdner SC
2008	VfB Suhl	3 – 1 (25-20, 25–22, 23–25, 25–19)	NA. Hamburg
2009	Rote Raben Vilsbiburg	3 – 2 (25-22, 25–23, 16–25, 18–25, 15–12)	Dresdner SC
2010	Dresdner SC	3 – 1 (29-27, 16–25, 25–22, 25–19)	VfB Suhl
2011	Smart Allianz Stuttgart	3 – 0 (25-21, 28–26, 25–20)	VfB Suhl
2012	Schweriner SC	3 – 1 (25-21, 25–15, 23–25, 27–25)	Rote Raben Vilsbiburg
2013	Schweriner SC	3 – 0 (25-20, 25–20, 25–17)	1. VC Wiesbaden
2014	Rote Raben Vilsbiburg	3 – 0 (25-22, 25–22, 25–20)	VolleyStars Thüringen
2015	Allianz MTV Stuttgart	3 – 2 (17-25, 20–25, 25–19, 25–19, 15–13)	Ladies in Black Aachen
2016	Dresdner SC	3 – 2 (25-22, 20–25, 25–18, 17–25, 15–10)	Allianz MTV Stuttgart
2017	Allianz MTV Stuttgart	3 – 2 (22-25, 21–25, 25–23, 25–15, 15–12)	Schweriner SC
2018	Dresdner SC	3 – 0 (25-21, 25–22, 25–18)	1. VC Wiesbaden
2019	SSC Palmberg Schwerin	3 – 0 (25-21, 25–21, 25–20)	Allianz MTV Stuttgart
2020	Dresdner SC	3 – 2 (25-19, 20–25, 21–25, 28–26, 17–15)	Allianz MTV Stuttgart
2021	SSC Palmberg Schwerin	3 – 0 (25-19, 25–13, 25–18)	SC Potsdam
2022	Allianz MTV Stuttgart	3 – 0 (25-17, 25-15, 25-15)	Dresdner SC
2023	SSC Palmberg Schwerin	3 – 1 (20-25, 25-14, 25-17, 25-20)	SC Potsdam
2024	Allianz MTV Stuttgart	3 – 0 (25-14, 25-19, 25-15)	SC Potsdam

== Honours by club ==
Rk.	Club	Titles	City	Years won
1	USC Münster	11	Münster	1973, 1974, 1975, 1976, 1979, 1991, 1996, 1997, 2000, 2004, 2005
2	Schweriner SC	8	Schwerin	2001, 2006, 2007, 2012, 2013, 2019, 2021, 2022
3	Dresdner SC	6	Dresden	1999, 2002, 2010, 2016, 2018, 2020
4	Allianz MTV Stuttgart	5	Stuttgart	2011, 2015, 2017, 2022, 2023
5	1. VC Schwerte	4	Schwerte	1977, 1978, 1980, 1998
=	SV Lohhof	4	Unterschleißheim	1982, 1983, 1984, 1986
=	CJD Feuerbach	4	Feuerbach	1987, 1988, 1989, 1990
=	CJD Berlin	4	Berlin	1992, 1993, 1994, 1995
9	Rote Raben Vilsbiburg	2	Vilsbiburg	2009, 2014
10	TG 1862 Rüsselsheim	1	Rüsselsheim	1981
=	TG Viktoria Augsburg	1	Augsbourg	1985
=	SSV Ulm Aliud Pharma	1	Ulm	2003
=	VfB Suhl	1	Suhl	2008
