= 2002 Women's Pan-American Volleyball Cup squads =

This article shows all participating team squads at the 2002 Women's Pan-American Volleyball Cup, held from June 26–30, 2002 in Tijuana, Mexico.

== Canada ==
- Head Coach: Lorne Sawula

#	Name	Date of Birth	Height	Weight	Spike	Block
7	Barb Bellini	March 14, 1977 (aged 25)	185 cm (6 ft 1 in)
9	Miroslava Pribylova	August 15, 1970 (aged 31)	178 cm (5 ft 10 in)
11	Jennifer Rauh	July 11, 1971 (aged 30)	182 cm (6 ft 0 in)
13	Rae-Anne Mitchell	March 18, 1973 (aged 29)	188 cm (6 ft 2 in)
15	Melissa Raymond (c)	August 27, 1980 (aged 21)	187 cm (6 ft 2 in)
16	Annie Levesque	September 9, 1979 (aged 22)	164 cm (5 ft 5 in)
17	Cheryl Stinson	February 8, 1980 (aged 22)	185 cm (6 ft 1 in)
18	Janis Kelly	March 20, 1971 (aged 31)	175 cm (5 ft 9 in)

== Cuba ==
- Head Coach: Eugenio George

#	Name	Date of Birth	Height	Weight	Spike	Block
1	Yumilka Ruiz (c)
2	Yaneli Santos
3	Nancy Carrillo
8	Yaima Ortiz
11	Liana Mesa
13	Anniara Muñoz
15	Marta Zamora
17	Marta Sánchez
18	Zoila Barros

== Dominican Republic ==
- Head Coach:

#	Name	Date of Birth	Height	Weight	Spike	Block
1	Annerys Vargas (c)
3	Yudelkis Bautista
5	Evelin Carreras
9	Nurys Arias
10	Milagros Cabral
12	Francia Jackson
18	Cosiri Rodríguez

== Mexico ==
- Head Coach: Sergio Hernández

#	Name	Date of Birth	Height	Weight	Spike	Block
1	Yendy Cortinas	04.07.1982	185	71	296	294
2	Migdalel Ruiz (c)	03.03.1983	180	75	307	298
3	Célida Córdova	01.08.1980	174	68	282	272
5	Kenia Olvera	06.05.1975	185	74	295	275
7	Laura Salinas (c)
10	Bibiana Candelas	02.12.1983	196	78	310	302
11	Blanca Chan	26.07.1981	182	75	298	286
12	Claudia Rodríguez	10.08.1981	191	95	315	305
13	Mariana López	30.08.1985	178	69	295	286
17	Paola Estrada	11.09.1979	171	67	285	265

== Mexico ==
- Head Coach:

#	Name	Date of Birth	Height	Weight	Spike	Block
1	Lourdes Isern
6	Yarleen Santiago
7	Sheila Ocasio
11	Karina Ocasio
12	Xiomara Molero
15	Ania Ruiz
17	Jetzabel del Valle

== United States ==
- Head Coach:

#	Name	Date of Birth	Height	Weight	Spike	Block
1	Erin Aldrich
3	Kathleen Olsovsky
4	Nina Puikkonen
5	Addie Hauschild
7	Kim Willoughby
10	Nicole Branagh
12	Greichaly Cepero
