= 2003 Women's NORCECA Volleyball Championship squads =

This article shows all participating team squads at the 2003 Women's NORCECA Volleyball Championship, held from September 13 to September 18, 2003, in Santo Domingo, Dominican Republic.

== Canada ==
- Head Coach: Lorne Sawula

#	Name	Date of Birth	Height	Weight	Spike	Block
1	Stephanie Wheler
3	Amy Tutt
4	Tammy Mahon
6	Anne-Marie Lemieux
7	Barb Bellini
10	Lies Verhoeff
13	Sarah Pavan
14	Julie Salyn
15	Melissa Raymond (c)
16	Annie Levesque
17	Cheryl Stinson
18	Gina Schmidt

== Cuba ==
- Head Coach: Luis Felipe Calderon

#	Name	Date of Birth	Height	Weight	Spike	Block
1	Yumilka Ruiz (c)
2	Yaneli Santos
3	Nancy Carrillo
4	Katia Guevara
8	Yaima Ortiz
9	Indira Mestre
11	Liana Mesa
12	Rosir Calderon
13	Anniara Muñoz
16	Dulce Tellez
17	Marta Sánchez
18	Zoila Barros

== United States ==
- Head Coach: Toshi Yoshida

#	Name	Date of Birth	Height	Weight	Spike	Block
1	Prikeba Phipps	30.06.1969	190	77	319	303
2	Danielle Scott (c)	01.10.1972	188	84	325	302
3	Tayyiba Haneef	23.03.1979	200	80	318	299
4	Lindsey Berg	16.07.1980	173	81	285	270
5	Stacy Sykora	24.06.1977	176	61	305	295
6	Elisabeth Bachman	07.11.1978	192	88	319	299
7	Heather Bown	29.11.1978	188	90	301	290
10	Brittany Hochevar		183
11	Robyn Ah Mow-Santos	15.09.1975	172	68	291	281
12	Nancy Metcalf	12.11.1978	184	73	314	292
15	Logan Tom	25.05.1981	184	80	306	297
16	Sarah Noriega	24.04.1976	187	70	302	301
