= 2003 Women's Pan-American Volleyball Cup squads =

This article shows all participating team squads at the 2003 Women's Pan-American Volleyball Cup, held from Monday June 30 to Saturday July 5, 2003 in Saltillo, Coahuila, Mexico.

== Canada ==
- Head Coach: Lorne Sawula

#	Name	Date of Birth	Height	Weight	Spike	Block
1	Stephanie Wheler
3	Amy Tutt
5	Lisa Reynolds
6	Anne-Marie Lemieux
7	Barb Bellini
9	Janis Kelly
10	Lies Verhoeff
14	Julie Salyn
15	Melissa Raymond (c)
16	Annie Levesque
17	Cheryl Stinson
18	Gina Schmidt

== Cuba ==
- Head Coach: Luis Felipe Calderon

#	Name	Date of Birth	Height	Weight	Spike	Block
1	Yumilka Ruiz (c)
2	Yaneli Santos
3	Nancy Carrillo
4	Katia Guevara
8	Yaima Ortiz
9	Indira Mestre
11	Liana Mesa
12	Rosir Calderon
13	Anniara Muñoz
16	Dulce Tellez
17	Marta Sánchez
18	Zoila Barros

== Mexico ==
- Head Coach: Sergio Hernández

#	Name	Date of Birth	Height	Weight	Spike	Block
1	Yendy Cortinas	04.07.1982	185	71	296	294
2	Migdalel Ruiz (c)	03.03.1983	180	75	307	298
3	Célida Córdova	01.08.1980	174	68	282	272
4	Selena Barajas	22.01.1982	182	72	296	275
5	Kenia Olvera	06.05.1975	185	74	295	275
6	Martha Revuelta	06.09.1986	176	77	295	287
10	Bibiana Candelas	02.12.1983	196	78	310	302
11	Blanca Chan	26.07.1981	182	75	298	286
12	Claudia Rodríguez	10.08.1981	191	95	315	305
13	Mariana López	30.08.1985	178	69	295	286
17	Paola Estrada	11.09.1979	171	67	285	265
18	Gloria Segura
