= 2005 Women's NORCECA Volleyball Championship squads =

This article shows all participating team squads at the 2005 Women's NORCECA Volleyball Championship, held from September 4 to September 12, 2005 in Port of Spain, Trinidad and Tobago.

== Canada ==
- Head Coach: Lorne Sawula

#	Name	Date of Birth	Height	Weight	Spike	Block
2	Tara Smart
4	Tammy Mahon
6	Anne-Marie Lemieux
9	Emily Cordonier
10	Lies Reimer
11	Julie Morin
12	Tawana Wardlaw
14	Julie Salyn
15	Melissa Raymond (c)
16	Annie Levesque
17	Cheryl Stinson
18	Gina Schmidt

== Cuba ==
- Head Coach: Luis Felipe Calderon

#	Name	Date of Birth	Height	Weight	Spike	Block
1	Yumilka Ruiz (c)
2	Yanelis Santos
3	Nancy Carrillo
4	Katia Guevara
6	Daimi Ramírez
8	Yaima Ortiz
9	Indira Mestre
12	Rosir Calderon
18	Zoila Barros

== Dominican Republic ==
- Head Coach: Francisco Cruz Jiménez

#	Name	Date of Birth	Height	Weight	Spike	Block
1	Annerys Vargas	07.08.1982	191	70	303	298
3	Yudelkys Bautista	05.12.1974	193	68	312	308
4	Dahiana Burgos	07.04.1985	188	58	312	302
6	Alexandra Caso	25.04.1987	168	59	243	241
7	Sofía Mercedes (c)	25.05.1976	185	70	306	298
11	Juana Miguelina González	03.01.1979	185	70	295	290
12	Karla Echenique	16.05.1986	181	62	279	273
13	Cindy Rondón	12.11.1988	189	61	312	305
14	Prisilla Rivera	29.12.1986	183	67	309	305
15	Cosiri Rodríguez	30.08.1977	191	72	313	305
16	Kenya Moreta	07.04.1981	191	76	310	305
18	Bethania de la Cruz	13.05.1989	188	58	322	305

== Mexico ==
- Head Coach: Marco Heredia

#	Name	Date of Birth	Height	Weight	Spike	Block
	Elizabeth Salas
	Arcelia Rangel
	Mariela García
	Valery Garza
2	Migdalel Ruiz	03.03.1983	180	75	307	298
3	Célida Córdova	01.08.1980	174	68	282	272
8	Ana Mercado (c)	19.02.1983	185	82
11	Blanca Chan	26.07.1981	182	75	298	286
12	Claudia Rodríguez	10.08.1981	191	95	315	305
18	Gloria Segura	11.02.1982	189	79

== United States ==
- Head Coach: Lang Ping

#	Name	Date of Birth	Height	Weight	Spike	Block
1	Patrice Arrington
2	Danielle Scott
3	Tayyiba Haneef
4	Lindsey Berg
5	Sarah Drury
6	Elisabeth Bachman
8	Katie Wilkins
10	Therese Crawford
11	Robyn Ah Mow-Santos
12	Nancy Metcalf
15	Nicole Davis
17	Jennifer Joines
