= 2005 Women's Pan-American Volleyball Cup squads =

This article shows all participating team squads at the 2005 Women's Pan-American Volleyball Cup, held from June 8 to June 19, 2005, in Santo Domingo, Dominican Republic.

== Argentina ==
- Head Coach: Alejandro Arconada

#	Name	Date of Birth	Height	Weight	Spike	Block
1	Georgina Pinedo	30.05.1981	177	65	305	281
2	Marianela Robinet	24.11.1983	172	54	286	275
3	María Frontera
4	Sabrina Segui	12.05.1978	180	68	282	271
5	Mirna Ansaldi (c)	10.07.1977
6	Viviana Dominko
7	Paula Parisi	15.09.1967	177	68	305	283
9	Melisa Callo	05.03.1988
10	Micaela Vogel
12	Ileana Leyendeker	14.10.1986
13	Leticia Boscacci	08.11.1985
15	Antonella Bortolozzi

== Canada ==
- Head Coach: Naoki Miyashita

#	Name	Date of Birth	Height	Weight	Spike	Block
1	Stephanie Wheler
3	Joanna Niemczewska	07.12.1983
4	Tammy Mahon
8	Stephanie Penner
9	Emily Cordonier
10	Lies Reimer
11	Julie Morin
13	Falin Schaefer
15	Melissa Raymond (c)
16	Annie Levesque
17	Cheryl Stinson
18	Gina Schmidt

== Cuba ==
- Head Coach: Luis Felipe Calderon

#	Name	Date of Birth	Height	Weight	Spike	Block
1	Yumilka Ruiz (c)
2	Yanelis Santos
3	Nancy Carrillo
6	Daimi Ramírez
8	Yaima Ortiz
9	Rachel Sánchez
12	Rosir Calderon
14	Kenia Carcaces
18	Zoila Barros

== Dominican Republic ==
- Head Coach: Francisco Cruz Jiménez

#	Name	Date of Birth	Height	Weight	Spike	Block
1	Annerys Vargas	07.08.1982	191	70	303	298
3	Yudelkys Bautista	05.12.1974	193	68	312	308
4	Dahiana Burgos	07.04.1985	188	58	312	302
5	Evelyn Carrera	05.10.1971	182	70	301	297
7	Sofía Mercedes (c)	25.05.1976	185	70	306	298
11	Juana Miguelina González	03.01.1979	185	70	295	290
12	Karla Echenique	16.05.1986	181	62	279	273
13	Cindy Rondón	12.11.1988	189	61	312	305
14	Prisilla Rivera	29.12.1986	183	67	309	305
15	Cosiri Rodríguez	30.08.1977	191	72	313	305
16	Kenya Moreta	07.04.1981	191	76	310	305
17	Sidarka de los Milagros	25.06.1984	188	58	312	308

== United States ==
- Head Coach: Lang Ping

#	Name	Date of Birth	Height	Weight	Spike	Block
1	Cynthia Barboza
2	Jane Collymore
3	Foluke Akinradewo
4	Lindsey Berg
5	Melissa Villaroman
6	Angie McGinnis
8	Greichaly Cepero-Febres
9	Ogonna Nnamani
11	Patrice Arrington
12	Nancy Metcalf
13	Elisha Thomas
15	Nicole Davis
17	Jennifer Joines
18	Shonda Cole
