= 2004 Women's Pan-American Volleyball Cup squads =

This article shows all participating team squads at the 2004 Women's Pan-American Volleyball Cup, held from June 17 to June 27, 2004, in Mexicali and Tijuana, Mexico.

== Canada ==
- Head Coach: Lorne Sawula

#	Name	Date of birth	Height	Weight	Spike	Block
1	Stephanie Wheler					
3	Amy Tutt					
4	Tammy Mahon					
6	Anne-Marie Lemieux					
7	Barb Bellini					
9	Emily Cordonier					
10	Lies Verhoeff					
13	Falin Schaefer					
15	Melissa Raymond (c)					
16	Annie Levesque					
17	Cheryl Stinson					
18	Gina Schmidt					

== United States ==
- Head Coach: Kevin Hambly

No.	Name	Hgt.	Pos.	School/Club	Hometown
4	Lindsey Berg	5-8	S	Minnesota	Honolulu, Hawaii
6	Elisabeth Bachman	6-4	MB	UCLA	Lakeville, Minn.
8	Greichaly Cepero-Febres	6-2	S	Nebraska	Dorado, Puerto Rico
9	Ogonna Nnamani	6-1	OH	Stanford	Normal, Ill.
10	Brittany Hochevar	6-0	OH/S	Long Beach State	Fowler, Colo.
12	Nancy Metcalf	6-1	OPP	Nebraska	Hull, Iowa
14	Elisha Thomas	6-3	MB	Long Beach State	Grass Valley, Calif.
16	Sarah Noriega	6-3	OPP	Loyola Marymount	Ulysses, Kan.
17	Sarah Drury	5-5	L	Louisville	Louisville, Ky.
18	Cynthia Barboza	6-0	OH	Long Beach Wilson HS	Long Beach, Calif.
