= 2022 Women's Pan-American Volleyball Cup squads =

This article shows the roster of all participating teams at the 2022 Women's Pan-American Volleyball Cup.

== Pool A ==
=== Dominican Republic ===
The following is the Dominican Republic's roster

Head coach: (Brazil) Marcos Kwiek

- 1 Florangel Terrero MB
- 2 Yaneirys Rodriguez L
- 4 Vielka Peralta OH
- 5 Brenda Castillo L
- 7 Niverka Marte S
- 8 Cándida Arias MB
- 9 Angélica Hinojosa MB
- 14 Camila de la Rosa S
- 15 Madeline Guillen OH
- 16 Yonkaira Peña OH
- 18 Bethania de la Cruz OH
- 22 Samaret Caraballo OH
- 23 Gaila González OP
- 24 Geraldine González MB

=== Costa Rica ===
The following is the Costa Rica's roster:

Head coach:

=== Peru ===
The following is Peru's roster:

Head coach:

=== Puerto Rico ===
The following is the Puerto Rico's roster:

Head coach:

=== United States ===
The following is United States' roster:

Head Coach: Brad Rostratter

- 10 Brionne Butler MB
- 14 Mac May OH
- 17 Dani Drews OH
- 21 Roni Jones-Perry OH
- 22 Kendall White L
- 26 Rhamat Alhassan MB
- 27 Avery SkinnerOH
- 28 Ashley Evans S
- 32 Hana Lishman L
- 33 Nia Reed OP
- 34 Stephanie Samedy OP
- 35 Tori Dilfer S
- 36 Madeleine Gates MB
- 37 Ali Bastianelli MB

== Pool B ==
=== Canada ===
Head Coach:

- 1 Alyssah Fitterer OP
- 2 Melissa Langegger OH
- 6 Grace Calnan MB
- 7 Layne Van Buskirk MB
- 10 Courtney Baker S
- 14 Gabrielle Attieh MB
- 15 Trinity Solecki OH
- 17 Kacey Jost L
- 19 Hannah Duchesneau OH
- 21 Avery Heppell MB
- 22 Kennedy Snape L
- 23 Laura Madill S
- 24 Natasha Calkins OH
- 25 Sydney Grills OH

=== Cuba ===
The following is Cuba's roster:

Head Coach:

=== Colombia ===
The following is Colombia's roster:

Head Coach:

=== Mexico ===
The following is Mexico's roster:

Head Coach:

=== Nicaragua ===
The following is Nicaragua's roster:

Head Coach:
