= Andrea Mitrovic =

Volleyball player for Canada women's national volleyball team

Personal information
- Nationality: (Canada) Canadian
- Born: June 3, 1999 (age 27); Mississauga, Ontario
- Height: 187 cm (6 ft 2 in)
- Education: Buffalo & Arizona

Volleyball information
- Position: Outside hitter
- Current club: Dentil Praia Clube
- Number: 11 (national team)

Career
Years	Teams
2017–2019	Buffalo University
2019-2020	Arizona State
2020–2021	CSU Medicina Târgu Mureș
2021-2022	AO Thiras
2022-2023	Karayolları Spor Kulübü
2023-2024	Grot Budowlani Łódź
2024-2025	Shenzhen Zhongsai
2024-2025	Bộ Tư lệnh Thông tin
2025-2026	LOVB Madison
2026-	Dentil Praia Clube

National team
Canada
Honours
Women's volleyball
Representing Canada
Challenger Cup
Gold medal – first place	2019 Lima	Team
NORCECA Championship
Gold medal – first place	2026 Santo Domingo
Bronze medal – third place	2021 Guadalajara
Bronze medal – third place	2023 Quebec City

Andrea Mitrovic (Serbian Cyrillic: Андреа Митровић; born 3 June 1999) is a Serbian Canadian volleyball player who plays as an outside hitter for the Canada women's national volleyball team.

== Early life ==
Mitrovic attended Silverthorn Collegiate Institute in Toronto, where she helped lead her high school volleyball team to an 18-1 record.

== Career ==
Mitrovic played for University at Buffalo and Arizona State University. She plays for Karayolları Spor Kulübü.

She competed at the 2022 FIVB Volleyball Women's Nations League, and 2023 FIVB Volleyball Women's Nations League.
