= 2008 CIS Women's Volleyball Championship =

- Season: 2007–08
- Teams: Eight
- Finals site: Aitken University Centre; Fredericton, New Brunswick
- Champions: UBC Thunderbirds (5th title)
- Runner-up: Montreal Carabins
- Winning coach: Doug Reimer (2nd title)
- Championship MVP: Carla Bradstock (UBC Thunderbirds)

The 2008 CIS Women's Volleyball Championship was held February 28, 2008 to March 1, 2008, in Fredericton, New Brunswick, to determine a national champion for the 2007–08 CIS women's volleyball season. The tournament was played at the Aitken University Centre and was hosted by the University of New Brunswick. It was the first time that the University of New Brunswick had hosted the tournament.

The fourth-seeded UBC Thunderbirds won a five-set gold medal match over the Montreal Carabins to win their first national championship since 1978. UBC had won medals in seven of the previous 13 tournaments, but had fallen short of a gold medal win, including in 2005 and 2006 when they lost to Sherbrooke and Laval, respectively. Notably, from this year's championship team, Carla Bradstock's and Kyla Richey's mothers were members of the 1978 Thunderbirds team that had last won a national championship for UBC.

== Participating teams ==
Seed	Team	Qualified	Record	Last	Total
1	Alberta Pandas	Canada West Champion	14–6	2007	7
2	Montreal Carabins	QSSF Champion	18–3	None	0
3	Calgary Dinos	Canada West Finalist	16–4	2004	3
4	UBC Thunderbirds	Canada West Bronze	17–3	1978	4
5	Sherbrooke Vert et Or	QSSF Finalist	16–5	2005	2
6	McMaster Marauders	OUA Champion	15–4	None	0
7	UNB Varsity Reds	AUS Champion (Host)	15–5	None	0
8	Saint Mary's Huskies	AUS Finalist	13–7	None	0

== Championship bracket ==
First Round: February 28
1	Alberta Pandas	3
8	Saint Mary's Huskies	0
4	UBC Thunderbirds	3
5	Sherbrooke Vert et Or	0
2	Montreal Carabins	3
7	UNB Varsity Reds	1
3	Calgary Dinos	3
6	McMaster Marauders	0

Semi-Finals: February 29
1	Alberta Pandas	2
4	UBC Thunderbirds	3
2	Montreal Carabins	3
3	Calgary Dinos	1

Gold Medal Game: March 1
2	Montreal Carabins	2
4	UBC Thunderbirds	3
Bronze Medal Game: March 1
1	Alberta Pandas	2
3	Calgary Dinos	3

== Consolation bracket ==
Semi-Finals: February 29
5	Sherbrooke Vert et Or	3
8	Saint Mary's Huskies	0
6	McMaster Marauders	3
7	UNB Varsity Reds	1

Fifth Place Game: March 1
5	Sherbrooke Vert et Or	3
6	McMaster Marauders	1

== Awards ==
=== Championship awards ===
- CIS Tournament MVP – Carla Bradstock, UBC
- R.W. Pugh Fair Play Award – Stéphanie Amyot, Sherbrooke

=== All-Star Team ===
- Carla Bradstock, UBC
- Liz Cordonier, UBC
- Jamie Broder, UBC
- Laetitia Tchoualack, Montréal
- Janie Guimond, Montréal
- Holly Harper, Calgary
- Daryll Roper, Alberta
