= Shannon Winzer =

Canadian volleyball coach

Personal information
- Nationality: Canada; Australia
- Born: Shannon Campbell; 1979 (age 46–47); Port Coquitlam, British Columbia, Canada

Coaching information
- Current team: Canada women's national volleyball team (high performance director)
Previous teams coached
Years	Teams
2013–2017; 2017–2019; 2019–2021; 2014–2015; 2016–2018; 2017; 2019–2020; 2020–2025	Uni Blues; Centre of Excellence; National Excellence Program; Australia (assistant coach); Australia; Australia U23; Canada (assistant coach); Canada U23; Canada
Honours
Coach for Women's volleyball
Canada
NORCECA Championship
Bronze medal – third place	2019 San Juan
Bronze medal – third place	2021 Guadalajara
Bronze medal – third place	2023 Quebec City
Challenger Cup
Gold medal – first place	2019 Lima

Shannon Winzer (née Campbell; born 1979) is the current Volleyball Canada high performance director, former volleyball coach, and retired volleyball player. She was the head coach for Canada women's national volleyball team from 2020 to 2025. She coached the Australia women's national team between 2016 and 2018.
