= 2021 Women's Pan-American Volleyball Cup =

Volleyball tournament

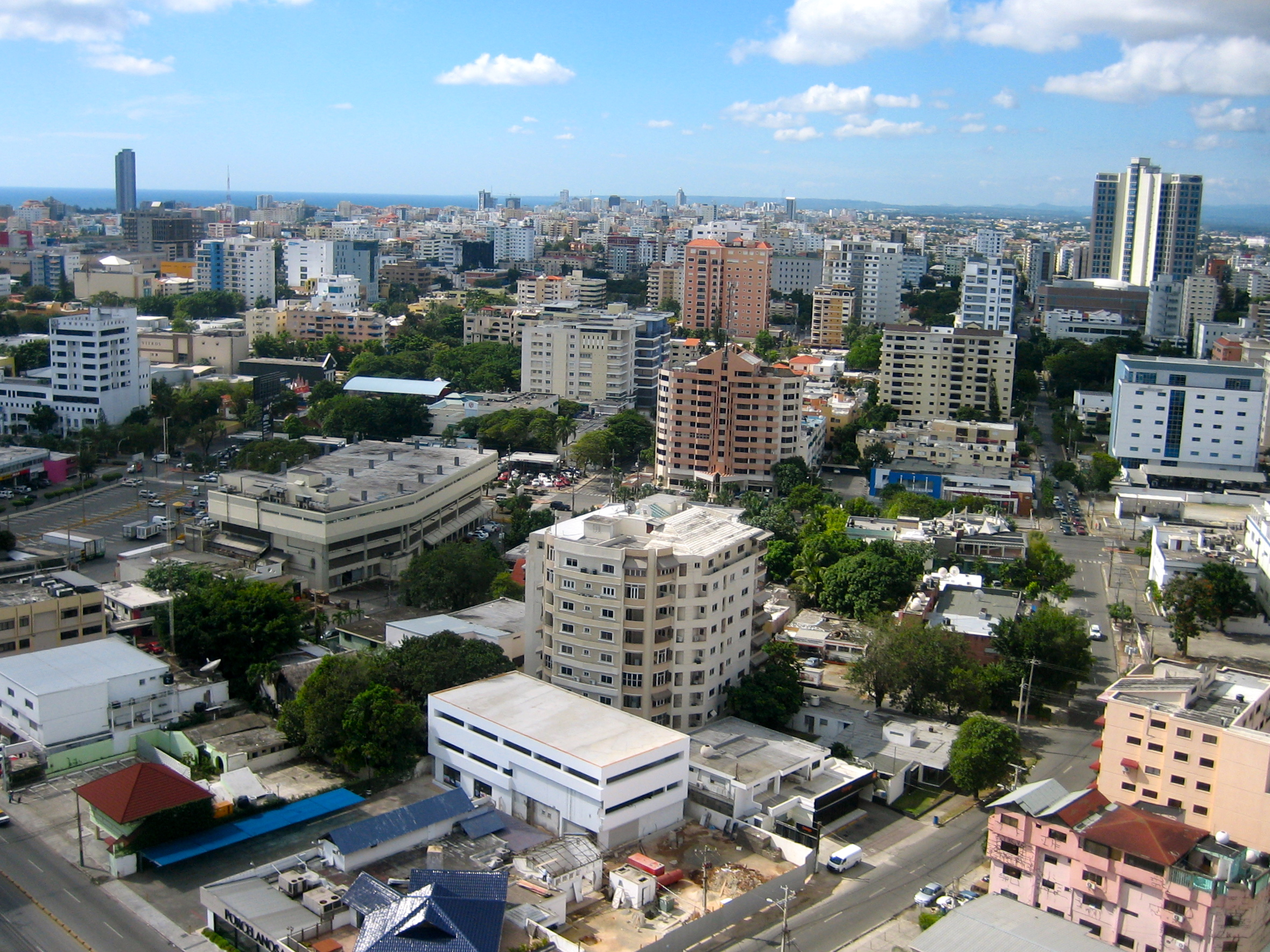
- Santo Domingo, host city of the tournament

Tournament details
- Host country: Dominican Republic
- Dates: 11–20 September
- Teams: 6
- Venue: 1 (in 1 host city)

Final positions
- Champions: Dominican Republic (5th title)

Tournament awards
- MVP: (Dominican Republic) Prisilla Rivera

The 2021 Women's Pan-American Volleyball Cup was an exceptional edition of the annual women's volleyball tournament. It was held in Santo Domingo, Dominican Republic from September 11–20, 2021.

Dominican Republic won the gold medal after defeating the Mexico in the final by 3–0.

== Venues ==
- Pabellón de Voleibol, Santo Domingo, Dominican Republic

== Participating nations ==
A maximum of six (6) teams are qualified by the FIVB/NORCECA ranking, plus the points earned as results of the past 2019 XVIII Norceca Senior Women Pan- American Cup to participate in the 2021 Norceca XIX Senior Women Pan American Cup, Final Six.

Dominican Republic qualified as the host nation, and the remaining 5 qualifying teams are the top 5 in the NORCECA continental ranking as of January 1, 2021.

No South American teams participated as this tournament coincided with the South American women's championships.

- Canada
- Cuba
- Dominican Republic
- Mexico
- Puerto Rico
- United States

== Round robin ==
Date	Time		Score		Set 1	Set 2	Set 3	Set 4	Set 5	Total	Report
13 Sept	15:00	Puerto Rico	0–3	Canada	17–25	16–25	18–25			51–75	P2 P3
13 Sept	17:00	United States	3–1	Mexico	21–25	25–17	26–24	29–27		101–93	P2 P3
13 Sept	19:00	Dominican Republic	3–0	Cuba	25–17	25–12	25–20			75–49	P2 P3
14 Sept	15:00	Cuba	0–3	Canada	11–25	14–25	10–25			35–75	P2 P3
14 Sept	17:00	United States	3–0	Puerto Rico	25–19	25–14	25–17			75–50	P2 P3
14 Sept	19:00	Dominican Republic	3–0	Mexico	25–22	25–12	25–17			75–51	P2 P3
15 Sept	15:00	Cuba	2–3	Mexico	25–22	24–26	25–17	16–25	10–15	100–105	P2 P3
15 Sept	17:00	United States	3–0	Canada	25–22	25–16	25–18			75–56	P2 P3
15 Sept	19:00	Dominican Republic	3–0	Puerto Rico	25–11	25–10	25–20			75–41	P2 P3
16 Sept	15:00	Mexico	3–1	Puerto Rico	19–25	25–15	25–13	25–15		94–68	P2 P3
16 Sept	17:00	United States	3–0	Cuba	25–11	25–18	25–17			75–46	P2 P3
16 Sept	19:00	Dominican Republic	3–0	Canada	25–11	25–15	25–20			75–46	P2 P3
17 Sept	15:00	Puerto Rico	1–3	Cuba	25–15	21–25	20–25	19–25		85–90	P2 P3
17 Sept	17:00	Canada	2–3	Mexico	24–26	25–22	22–25	25–17	12–15	108–105	P2 P3
17 Sept	19:00	Dominican Republic	3–0	United States	25–22	25–15	25–12			75–49	P2 P3

== Final rounds ==
=== Semifinals ===
Date	Time		Score		Set 1	Set 2	Set 3	Set 4	Set 5	Total	Report
18 Sept	15:00	Cuba	3–0	Puerto Rico	25–19	25–23	25–20			75–62	P2 P3
18 Sept	17:00	United States	1–3	Mexico	25–22	21–25	23–25	19–25		88–97	P2 P3
18 Sept	19:00	Dominican Republic	3–0	Canada	25–15	25–20	25–21			75–56	P2 P3

=== 3rd place match ===
Date	Time		Score		Set 1	Set 2	Set 3	Set 4	Set 5	Total	Report
19 Sept	17:00	United States	3–0	Canada	26–24	25–17	25–17			76–58	P2 P3

=== Final ===
Date	Time		Score		Set 1	Set 2	Set 3	Set 4	Set 5	Total	Report
19 Sept	19:00	Mexico	0–3	Dominican Republic	15–25	21–25	14–25			50–75	P2 P3

== Statistics leaders ==
Statistics leaders of the tournament:

Top Scorers
	Player	Total
1	(Mexico) María Fernanda Rodríguez	105
2	(Canada) Hilary Howe	95
3	(Mexico) Samantha Bricio	88
4	(United States) Veronica Jones-Perry	82
5	(Dominican Republic) Gaila González	78

Best Blockers
	Player	Blocks
1	(Dominican Republic) Jineiry Martínez	17
2	(United States) Alison Bastianelli	16
3	(Mexico) Karina Flores	16
4	(Canada) Nyadholi Thokbuom	14
5	(United States) Danielle Cuttino	14

Best Servers
	Player	Aces
1	(Dominican Republic) Gaila González	17
2	(Canada) Hilary Howe	13
3	(Mexico) María Fernanda Rodríguez	12
4	(Mexico) Karina Flores	11
5	(Mexico) Samantha Bricio	10

== Final standing ==
Rank	Team
1st place, gold medalist(s)	Dominican Republic
2nd place, silver medalist(s)	Mexico
3rd place, bronze medalist(s)	United States
4	Canada
5	Cuba
6	Puerto Rico

2021 Women's Pan-American Cup

Dominican Republic
5th title

14-woman roster
Prisilla Rivera, Gaila González, Yonkaira Peña, Yaneirys Rodríguez, Brenda Castillo, Niverka Marte, María Hinojosa,
Geraldine González, Yokaty Pérez, Madeline Guillén, Esthefany Rabit, Brayelin Martínez, Jineiry Martínez, Larysmer Martínez
Head coach
Marcos Kwiek

== Individual awards ==
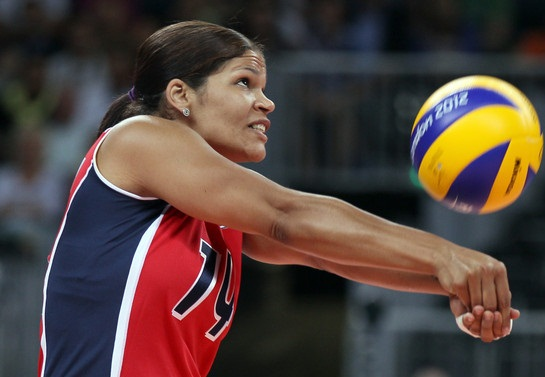
Prisilla Rivera was the 2021 Pan American Cup MVP

The following players received individual recognition following the conclusion of the tournament:

- Most valuable player
  (Dominican Republic) Prisilla Rivera
- Best setter
  (Canada) Brie O'Reilly
- Best outside hitters
  (Dominican Republic) Prisilla Rivera
  (United States) Veronica Jones-Perry
- Best middle blockers
  (Dominican Republic) Jineiry Martínez
  (United States) Alison Bastianelli
- Best Opposite
  (Mexico) María Fernanda Rodríguez
- Best scorer
  (Mexico) María Fernanda Rodríguez
- Best server
  (Dominican Republic) Gaila González
- Best libero
  (Dominican Republic) Brenda Castillo
- Best digger
  (Dominican Republic) Brenda Castillo
- Best receiver
  (Dominican Republic) Brenda Castillo
