= Marisa Field =

Canadian volleyball player

Personal information
- Nationality: Canadian
- Height: 1.89 m (6 ft 2 in)
- Spike: 312 cm (123 in)
- Block: 297 cm (117 in)
- Education: University of British Columbia

Volleyball information
- Position: Middle Blocker
- Current club: Sta. Lucia Lady Realtors
- Number: 3

Career
Years	Teams
2009	CV Las Palmas
2010	SV Sinsheim
2012	Istres Ouest Provence
2013	VolleyStars Thüringen
2014	Sagres NUC
2015	Panathinaikos
2016	Engelholms VS
2016	Panathinaikos
2017	Sta. Lucia Lady Realtors

National team
2007–	Canada

Marisa Field is a Canadian volleyball player who twice represented her home country in the FIVB World Championship, in 2010 and 2014.

She is a member of the Canada national team. She won the 2009 & 2011 NORCECA Championship Best Blocker award and played the FIVB World Grand Prix in 2014, 2015, and 2016.

== Career ==
Field studied in the University of British Columbia Okanagan and played with the Okanagan Lakers from 2004–2006, winning the British Columbia Colleges' Athletic Association All-Star the two seasons she played there. She later moved to the University of British Columbia campus of Vancouver to play for the Thunderbirds where she won the Canadian Interuniversity Sport national championship in 2008 and 2009 individually being awarded Conference First Team All-Star and CIS All-Canadian second team. and majored in Chemistry. In her last year of eligibility, she was part of the Team Canada that ranked 13th in the 2009 Summer Universiade held in Belgrade, Serbia. She was selected for the Canada national team in 2007.

Field teamed up with fellow Canadian Brittney Page among other international players in the Spanish club Ciudad Las Palmas G.C. Cantur. She would later recall that professional experience as the worst she ever had because of the many difficulties while in Spain.

She was part of the Canadian national team at the 2010 FIVB World Championship. She then departed for Germany to play with the professional club SV Sinsheim along with Tonya Mokelki.

Field won the Best Blocker award in the 2011 NORCECA Championship were her national team reached the sixth place.

She returned for her German club, now named Envacom Volleys Sinsheim.

For the 2012/13 she played with the French professional club Istres OPVB. There she had an eye accident and she was blind for two days, since that accident she uses glasses for playing, in order to prevent her eye being hit again. In June 2013, Field played with national team that ranked seventh in the 2013 Pan-American Cup.

The next season, Field moved to Germany playing with VfB 91 Suhl as the VolleyStars Thüringen project, helping her financially troubled club to the German Cup silver medal.

After playing the 2014 FIVB World Championship in Italy, Field moved to the Swiss Sagres Neuchâtel for the 2014/15 season, playing the 2014–15 CEV Cup with this club. Field joined her national team that ranked eight in the 2015 Pan American Games held in Toronto, Canada.

In January 2016, she joined the Swedish club Engelholms VS. Field played with her national team the 2016 FIVB World Grand Prix. She returned for Panathinaikos, as she signed the 2016/2017 season with the Greek club with compatriot Kyla Richey and later played the 2017 Pan-American Cup held in Peru, helping her national team to reach the sixth place. In September, she signed with the Philippine Super Liga club Sta. Lucia Lady Realtors.

== Clubs ==
- (Spain) Ciudad Las Palmas G.C. Cantur (2009–2010)
- (Germany) SV Sinsheim (2010–2012)
- (France) Istres OPVB (2012–2013)
- (Germany) VfB 91 Suhl (2013–2014)
- (Switzerland) Sagres Neuchâtel (2014–2015)
- (Greece) Panathinaikos (2015–2016)
- (Sweden) Engelholms VS (2016)
- (Greece) Panathinaikos (2016–2017)
- (Philippines) Sta. Lucia Lady Realtors (2017–2018)
- (Greece) AO Thiras (2018–2019)

== Awards ==
=== Individuals ===
- 2009 Women's NORCECA Volleyball Championship “Best Blocker”
- 2011 NORCECA Championship "Best Blocker"

=== Clubs ===
- 2014 German Cup – Runner-up, with VfB 91 Suhl
- 2015 Swiss Championship – Bronze medal, with Sagres Neuchâtel
- 2016 Swedish Championship – Champions, with Engelholms VS
- 2017 Greek Championship – Bronze medal, with Panathinaikos
