= Cassandra Bujan =

Canadian volleyball player, b. 1996

Personal information
- Nickname: Cassie
- Nationality: Canada
- Born: 25 April 1996 (age 30); Anola, Manitoba, Canada
- Height: 1.68 m (5 ft 6 in)
- Spike: 277 cm (109 in)
- Block: 262 cm (103 in)
- Education: University of Manitoba

Volleyball information
- Position: Libero

Career
Years	Teams
2019-20	Arenal Emervé

National team
2021 – present	Canada

Cassandra (Cassie) Bujan (born 25 April 1996) is a Canadian volleyball player from Anola, Manitoba. She played five years at the University of Manitoba, and made her first appearance on Team Canada in the 2019 FISU Summer Universiade in Naples, Italy.

She has since been on the Canadian women's national volleyball team for the 2021 FIVB Volleyball Women's Nations League and the 2021 Women's NORCECA Volleyball Championship.

She played for Arenal Emevé in the Spanish Superliga in 2020–21.

== Clubs ==
- 2013-2015 - Cobras volleyball
- 2015-2019 - University of Manitoba Bisons
- 2019 – (Spain) Arenal Emevé
- 2026 - orange crush women's league Div 2 (Dakota Community Centre League)
