= Canada women's national volleyball team =

Women's national volleyball team representing Canada

Canada
- Association: Volleyball Canada
- Confederation: NORCECA
- Head coach: Giovanni Guidetti
- FIVB ranking: 8 ▲4 (2 October 2026)

Uniforms
Home	Away

Summer Olympics
- Appearances: 3 (First in 1976)
- Best result: 8th place (1976, 1984)

World Championship
- Appearances: 11 (First in 1974)
- Best result: 10th place (2022)

World Cup
- Appearances: 4 (First in 1973)
- Best result: Group stage (1973)

NORCECA Championship
- Appearances: 27 (First in 1969)
- Best result: (2026)
- volleyball.ca
Honours
Medal record
Challenger Cup
Gold medal – first place	2019 Peru
Pan American Games
Bronze medal – third place	1995 Mar del Plata	Team
Pan-American Cup
Bronze medal – third place	2002 Mexico
Bronze medal – third place	2018 Dominican Republic
NORCECA Championship
Gold medal – first place	2026 Santo Domingo
Silver medal – second place	1973 Tijuana
Silver medal – second place	1989 San Juan
Bronze medal – third place	1977 Santo Domingo
Bronze medal – third place	1983 Indianapolis
Bronze medal – third place	1985 Santiago de los Caballeros
Bronze medal – third place	1987 Havana
Bronze medal – third place	1991 Regina
Bronze medal – third place	1993 Colorado
Bronze medal – third place	1995 Santo Domingo
Bronze medal – third place	1999 Monterrey
Bronze medal – third place	2019 San Juan
Bronze medal – third place	2021 Guadalajara
Bronze medal – third place	2023 Quebec City
NORCECA Championship Cup
Bronze medal – third place	2019 Colorado Springs
Savaria Cup
Silver medal – second place	1976 Szombathely

The Canada women's indoor national volleyball team represents Canada in international volleyball competitions. They are overseen by Volleyball Canada, the governing body for volleyball in Canada.

The purpose of the senior women's national team program is to identify, select, and train a group of athletes who have potential and demonstrated international skill and experience to represent Canada at the elite level.

== Results ==
=== Summer Olympics ===
Champions Runners up Third place Fourth place

Summer Olympics record
Year	Round	Position	Pld	W	L	SW	SL	Squad
(Japan) 1964	Did not qualify							
(Mexico) 1968	Did not qualify							
(West Germany) 1972	Did not qualify							
(Canada) 1976	Group stage	8th place	5	0	5	6	15	Squad
(Soviet Union) 1980	Did not qualify							
(United States) 1984	Group stage	8th place	5	0	5	0	15	Squad
(South Korea) 1988	Did not qualify							
(Spain) 1992	Did not qualify							
(United States) 1996	Group stage	9th place	5	1	4	3	14	Squad
(Australia) 2000	Did not qualify							
(Greece) 2004	Did not qualify							
(China) 2008	Did not qualify							
(United Kingdom) 2012	Did not qualify							
(Brazil) 2016	Did not qualify							
(Japan) 2020	Did not qualify							
(France) 2024	Did not qualify							
(United States) 2028	Qualified							
(Australia) 2032	To be determined							
Total	0 Titles	4/18	15	1	14	9	44	

=== World Championship ===
Champions Runners up Third place Fourth place

World Championship record
Year	Round	Position	Pld	W	L	SW	SL	Squad
(Soviet Union) 1952	Did not enter							
(France) 1956	Did not enter							
(Brazil) 1960	Did not enter							
(Soviet Union) 1962	Did not enter							
(Japan) 1967	Did not enter							
(Bulgaria) 1970	Did not qualify							
(Mexico) 1974	7th–12th places	11th place	11	3	8	15	27	Squad
(Soviet Union) 1978	13th–16th places	14th place	9	5	4	16	13	Squad
(Peru) 1982	9th–12th places	11th place	9	3	6	12	18	Squad
(Czechoslovakia) 1986	13th–16th places	15th place	3	0	3	2	9	Squad
(China) 1990	13th–16th places	14th place	6	2	4	9	12	Squad
(Brazil) 1994	Did not qualify							
(Japan) 1998	Did not qualify							
(Germany) 2002	First round	18th place	5	1	4	5	12	Squad
(Japan) 2006	Did not qualify							
(Japan) 2010	First round	21st place	5	0	5	3	15	Squad
(Italy) 2014	First round	17th place	5	1	4	4	13	Squad
(Japan) 2018	First round	18th place	5	1	4	4	13	Squad
(Netherlands) (Poland) 2022	Second round	10th place	9	5	4	17	18	Squad
(Thailand) 2025	Round of 16	15th place	4	2	2	6	9	Squad
(United States) (Canada) 2027	Qualified (Hosts)							
(Philippines) 2029	To be determined							
Total	0 Titles	11/22	71	23	48	93	159	

=== World Cup ===
Champions Runners up Third place Fourth place

World Cup record
Year	Round	Position	Pld	W	L	SW	SL	Squad
(Uruguay) 1973	Group stage	7th place	6	3	3	11	9	Squad
(Japan) 1977	Did not qualify							
(Japan) 1981	Did not qualify							
(Japan) 1985	Did not qualify							
(Japan) 1989	Group stage	8th place	7	0	7	4	21	Squad
(Japan) 1991	Group stage	10th place	5	1	4	6	13	Squad
(Japan) 1995	Group stage	9th place	11	3	8	11	24	Squad
(Japan) 1999	Did not qualify							
(Japan) 2003	Did not qualify							
(Japan) 2007	Did not qualify							
(Japan) 2011	Did not qualify							
(Japan) 2015	Did not qualify							
(Japan) 2019	Did not qualify							
Total	0 Titles	4/13	29	7	22	32	67	

=== World Grand Prix ===
Champions Runners up Third place Fourth place

World Grand Prix record
Year	Round	Position	Pld	W	L	SW	SL	Squad
(Hong Kong) 1993	Did not enter							
(China) 1994	Did not enter							
(China) 1995	Did not enter							
(China) 1996	Did not enter							
(Japan) 1997	Did not enter							
(Hong Kong) 1998	Did not enter							
(China) 1999	Did not enter							
(Philippines) 2000	Did not enter							
(Macau) 2001	Did not enter							
(Hong Kong) 2002	Did not enter							
(Italy) 2003	Preliminary round	11th place	5	0	5	2	15	Squad
(Italy) 2004	Did not qualify							
(Japan) 2005	Did not qualify							
(Italy) 2006	Did not qualify							
(China) 2007	Did not qualify							
(Japan) 2008	Did not qualify							
(Japan) 2009	Did not qualify							
(China) 2010	Did not qualify							
(Macau) 2011	Did not qualify							
(China) 2012	Did not qualify							
(Japan) 2013	Did not qualify							
(Japan) 2014	Group 2	19th place	9	2	7	11	23	Squad
(United States) 2015	Group 2	18th place	6	2	4	9	15	Squad
(Thailand) 2016	Group 2	19th place	6	0	6	3	18	Squad
(China) 2017	Group 2	20th place	9	3	6	15	20	Squad
Total	0 Titles	5/25	35	7	28	40	91	

=== Nations League ===
Champions Runners up Third place Fourth place

Year	Position	Pld	W	L	SW	SL
(China) 2018	Did not qualify					
(China) 2019	Did not qualify					
(China) 2020	Not held due to the COVID-19 pandemic					
(Italy) 2021	14th	15	3	12	17	39
(Turkey) 2022	12th	12	4	8	17	26
(United States) 2023	10th	12	6	6	24	24
(Thailand) 2024	10th	12	7	5	24	19
(Poland) 2025	16th	12	3	9	19	33
(Macau) 2026	6th	13	8	5	31	24
Total	6/8	76	31	45	132	165

=== Challenger Cup ===
Champions Runners up Third place Fourth place

Challenger Cup record
Year	Round	Position	Pld	W	L	SW	SL	Squad
(Peru) 2018	Did not enter							
(Peru) 2019	Final	Champions	4	4	0	12	2	Squad
(Croatia) 2022	Did not enter							
(France) 2023	Did not enter							
(Philippines) 2024	Did not enter							
Total	1 Title	1/5	4	4	0	12	2	

=== NORCECA Championship ===
Champions Runners up Third place Fourth place

NORCECA Championship record
Year	Round	Position	Pld	W	L	SW	SL	Squad
(Mexico) 1969		4th place						Squad
(Cuba) 1971	Did not enter							
(Mexico) 1973		Runners up						Squad
(United States) 1975		4th place						Squad
(Dominican Republic) 1977		Third place						Squad
(Cuba) 1979		4th place						Squad
(Mexico) 1981		4th place						Squad
(United States) 1983		Third place						Squad
(Dominican Republic) 1985		Third place						Squad
(Cuba) 1987		Third place						Squad
(Puerto Rico) 1989		Runners up						Squad
(Canada) 1991		Third place						Squad
(United States) 1993		Third place						Squad
(Dominican Republic) 1995		Third place						Squad
(Puerto Rico) 1997		4th place						Squad
(Mexico) 1999		Third place	6	4	2			Squad
(Dominican Republic) 2001	Did not enter							
(Dominican Republic) 2003	Semi Finals	4th place	6	3	3			Squad
(Trinidad and Tobago) 2005		5th place	5	2	3			Squad
(Canada) 2007	Semi Finals	4th place	6	3	3			Squad

NORCECA Championship record
Year	Round	Position	Pld	W	L	SW	SL	Squad
(Puerto Rico) 2009		5th place	6	3	3			Squad
(Puerto Rico) 2011		6th place	4	1	3			Squad
(United States) 2013	Semi Finals	4th place	5	2	3			Squad
(Mexico) 2015	Semi Finals	4th place	6	3	3			Squad
(Canada) 2017	Group stage	qualified for 2018 World Championship	3	3	0	9	0	Squad
(Puerto Rico) 2019		Third place	6	4	2	12	8	Squad
(Mexico) 2021		Third place	4	2	2	9	9	Squad
(Canada) 2023		Third place	4	3	1	10	4	Squad
(Dominican Republic) 2026	Final	Champions	5	5	0	15	4	Squad
Total	1 Title	27/29						

=== Pan American Games ===
Champions Runners up Third place Fourth place

Pan American Games record
Year	Round	Position	Pld	W	L	SW	SL	Squad
(Mexico) 1955	Did not enter							
(United States) 1959	Did not enter							
(Brazil) 1963	Did not enter							
(Canada) 1967	Round robin	6th place	5	0	5	0	15	Squad
(Colombia) 1971	Round robin	5th place	8	4	4	14	14	Squad
(Mexico) 1975	Round robin	4th place	6	3	3	12	13	Squad
(Puerto Rico) 1979	First round	6th place	7	2	5	9	16	Squad
(Venezuela) 1983	Group stage	5th place	7	3	4	9	12	Squad
(United States) 1987	Group stage	5th place	4	0	4	1	12	Squad
(Cuba) 1991	Semi-final	4th place	7	3	4	6	16	Squad
(Argentina) 1995	Semi-final	Third place	7	4	3	12	11	Squad
(Canada) 1999	Group stage	5th place	6	1	5	7	16	Squad

Pan American Games record
Year	Round	Position	Pld	W	L	SW	SL	Squad
(Dominican Republic) 2003	Did not enter							
(Brazil) 2007	Did not enter							
(Mexico) 2011	Preliminary round	7th place	5	1	4	6	13	Squad
(Canada) 2015		8th place	3	1	2	4	7	Squad
(Peru) 2019		8th place	4	0	4	2	12	Squad
(Chile) 2023	Did not qualify							
Total	0 Titles	12/18	69	22	47	82	157	

=== Pan American Cup ===
Champions Runners-up Third place Fourth place

Pan-American Cup record
Year	Round	Position	Pld	W	L	SW	SL	Squad
(Mexico) 2002	Semi-finals	Third place	5	3	2	9	6	Squad
(Mexico) 2003	Quarter-finals	6th place	5	1	4	4	13	Squad
(Mexico) 2004	Round robin	5th place	5	3	2	9	6	Squad
(Dominican Republic) 2005	Quarter-finals	6th place	7	3	4	9	12	Squad
(Puerto Rico) 2006	Round robin	7th place	6	3	3	11	11	Squad
(Mexico) 2007	Round robin	9th place	6	2	4	9	13	Squad
(Mexico) 2008	Quarter-finals	8th place	8	4	4	19	15	Squad
(United States) 2009	Round robin	7th place	7	3	4	12	14	Squad
(Mexico) 2010	Round robin	7th place	7	2	5	12	16	Squad
(Mexico) 2011	Round robin	7th place	8	4	4	13	12	Squad
(Mexico) 2012	Round robin	8th place	8	3	5	11	19	Squad
(Peru) 2013	Quarter-finals	7th place	5	2	3	11	11	Squad

Pan-American Cup record
Year	Round	Position	Pld	W	L	SW	SL	Squad
(Mexico) 2014	Quarter-finals	6th place	7	3	4	12	13	Squad
(Peru) 2015	Quarter-finals	5th place	7	4	3	13	12	Squad
(Dominican Republic) 2016	Quarter-finals	6th place	8	4	4	14	14	Squad
(Peru) 2017	Round robin	6th place	8	5	3	17	14	Squad
(Dominican Republic) 2018	Semi-finals	Third place	5	4	1	13	3	Squad
(Peru) 2019	Quarter-finals	6th place	8	5	3	17	14	Squad
(Dominican Republic) 2021	Semi-finals	Fourth place	7	2	5	8	15	Squad
(Mexico) 2022	Round robin	9th place	6	2	4	6	12	Squad
(Puerto Rico) 2023	Quarter-finals	8th place	5	2	3	8	11	Squad
(Mexico) 2024	Final round	7th place	8	4	4	16	14	Squad
(Mexico) 2025	Final round	8th place	6	2	4	11	13	Squad
Total	0 Titles	23/23						

== Team ==
=== Current squad ===
Roster for the 2025 FIVB Nations League.

Head coach: (Italy) Giovanni Guidetti

- 1 Katerina Georgiadis L
- 3 Kiera Van Ryk O
- 6 Jazmine White MB
- 9 Alexa Gray OH
- 10 Courtney Baker S
- 11 Andrea Mitrovic OH
- 13 Brie Fransen S
- 14 Hilary Johnson OH
- 16 Abagayle Guezen OH
- 17 Kacey Jost L
- 18 Anna Smrek O
- 19 Emily Maglio MB
- 22 Olivia Andulajevic OH
- 27 Nyadholi Thokbuom MB
- 37 Jessica Andrews MB

=== Coaching staff ===
Name	Position
(Italy) Giovanni Guidetti	Head Coach
(Italy) Vincenzo Mallia	Lead Assistant Coach
(Canada) Carolyn O'Dwyer	2nd Assistant Coach

=== 1976 Summer Olympics ===
- Regyna Armonas
- Betty Baxter
- Carole Bishop
- Barbara Dalton
- Mary Dempster
- Kathy Girvan
- Debbie Heeps
- Anne Ireland
- Connie Lebrun
- Claire Lloyd
- Patty Olson
- Audrey Vandervelden
- Head coach: Park Moo

=== 1984 Summer Olympics ===
- Diane Ratnik
- Suzi Smith
- Tracy Mills
- Joyce Gamborg
- Audrey Vandervelden
- Monica Hitchcock
- Karen Moore
- Rachel Beliveau
- Lise Martin
- Caroline Cote
- Barbara Broen
- Josee Lebel
- Head coach: Lorne Sawula

=== 1995 Pan American Games ===
- Lisa Kachkowsky
- Christine Toews
- Kerri Buchberger
- Tara MacIntyre
- Jenny Rauh
- Wanda Guenette
- Josée Corbeil
- Felicity Culley
- Janis Kelly
- Brigitte Soucy
- Michelle Sawatzky
- Lori Ann Mundt
- Head coach: Mike Burchuk

=== 1996 Summer Olympics ===
- Kerri Buchberger
- Josée Corbeil
- Wanda Guenette
- Janis Kelly
- Lori Ann Mundt
- Diane Ratnik
- Erminia Russo
- Michelle Sawatzky
- Brigitte Soucy
- Christine Stark
- Kathy Tough
- Katrina Von Sass
- Head coach: Mike Burchuk

=== 2002 World Championship ===
- Barb Bellini
- Kim Exner
- Janis Kelly
- Krista Kinsman
- Anne-Marie Lemieux
- Annie Levesque
- Rae-Anne Mitchell
- Miroslava Pribylova
- Melissa Raymond
- Joanne Ross
- Jennifer Rauh
- Amy Tutt
- Head coach: Lorne Sawula

=== 2003 World Grand Prix ===
- Stephanie Wheler
- Amy Tutt
- Tammy Mahon
- Lisa Reynolds
- Anne-Marie Lemieux
- Barb Bellini
- Janis Kelly
- Lies Verhoeff
- Sarah Pavan
- Melissa Raymond
- Annie Levesque
- Gina Schmidt
- Head coach: Lorne Sawula

=== 2007 NORCECA Championship ===
- Shelley Chalmers
- Emily Cordonier
- Larissa Cundy
- Tiffany Dodds
- Andrea Frustaci
- Stacey Gordon
- Sherline Tasha Holness
- Dayna Jansen
- Annie Levesque
- Tammy Mahon
- Stephanie Penner
- Tara Smart
- Head coach: Naoki Miyashita

=== 2008 Pan-American Cup ===
- Nadine Alphonse
- Emily Cordonier
- Larissa Cundy
- Tiffany Dodds
- Janie Guimond
- Sherline Tasha Holness
- Dayna Jansen
- Annie Levesque
- Samantha Loewen
- Tammy Mahon
- Tonya Mokelki
- Ashley Voth
- Head coach: Naoki Miyashita

=== 2009 Pan-American Cup ===
- Nadine Alphonse
- Julie Young
- Larissa Cundy
- Tiffany Dodds
- Janie Guimond
- Sherline Holness
- Jennifer Hinze
- Sophie Schlagintweit
- Colette Meek
- Tammy Mahon
- Tonya Mokelki
- Ashley Voth
- Brittney Page
- Lauren O'Reilly
- Head coach: Arnd Ludwig

=== 2009 Women's NORCECA Championship ===
- Nadine Alphonse
- Julie Young
- Larissa Cundy
- Tiffany Dodds
- Janie Guimond
- Sherline Holness
- Kristina Fabris
- Marisa Field
- Colette Meek
- Tammy Mahon
- Tonya Mokelki
- Ashley Voth
- Brittney Page
- Samantha Loewen
- Head coach: Arnd Ludwig

=== 2010 Women's Pan American Cup ===
- Nadine Alphonse
- Julie Young
- Carla Bradstock
- Janie Guimond
- Sherline Holness
- Lauren O'Reilly
- Marisa Field
- Sarah Pavan
- Tammy Mahon
- Tonya Mokelki
- Ashley Voth
- Kyla Richey
- Head coach: Arnd Ludwig

=== 2010 FIVB World Championship ===
- Nadine Alphonse
- Julie Young
- Carla Bradstock
- Janie Guimond
- Lauren O'Reilly
- Sherline Holness
- Tiffany Dodds
- Marisa Field
- Sarah Pavan
- Tammy Mahon
- Tonya Mokelki
- Kyla Richey
- Brittney Page
- Jennifer Hinze
- Head coach: Arnd Ludwig

=== 2011 Pan American Cup ===
- Nadine Alphonse
- Claire Hanna
- Carla Bradstock
- Marie Pier Murray-Methot
- Lauren O'Reilly
- Sherline Holness
- Lucy Charuk
- Elizabeth Cordonier
- Sarah Pavan
- Tammy Mahon
- Kyla Richey
- Brittney Page
- Head coach: Arnd Ludwig

=== 2011 NORCECA Championship ===
- Claire Hanna
- Julie Young
- Carla Bradstock
- Lauren O'Reilly
- Sherline Holness
- Marisa Field
- Elizabeth Cordonier
- Sarah Pavan
- Tammy Mahon
- Kyla Richey
- Brittney Page
- Jennifer Hinze
- Head coach: Arnd Ludwig

=== 2011 Pan American Games ===
- Claire Hanna
- Julie Young
- Carla Bradstock
- Lauren O'Reilly
- Sherline Holness
- Tricia Mayba
- Elizabeth Cordonier
- Colette Meek
- Tammy Mahon
- Kyla Richey
- Brittney Page
- Jennifer Hinze
- Head coach: Arnd Ludwig

=== 2012 Pan American Cup ===
- Janie Guimond
- Shanice Marcelle
- Jaclyn Ellis
- Kelci French
- Jennifer Cross
- Rebecca Pavan
- Lisa Barclay
- Marie-Pier Murray-Methot
- Jaimie Thibeault
- Alicia Perrin
- Brittney Page
- Sarah Pavan
- Head coach: Arnd Ludwig

=== 2019 Pan American Games ===
- Tesca Andrew-Wasylik
- Marisa Field
- Kyla Richey
- Danielle Smith
- Jennifer Lundqvist
- Brittney Page
- Dana Cranston
- Lisa Barclay
- Shanice Marcelle
- Lucy Charuk
- Tabitha Love
- Jaimie Thibeault
- Head coach:
  Shannon Winzer

=== 2019 FIVB Volleyball Women's Challenger Cup ===
- Kyla Richey
- Jessica Niles
- Autumn Bailey
- Kiera Van Ryk
- Danielle Smith
- Alicia Ogoms
- Alexa Lea Gray
- Andrea Mitrovic
- Jennifer Cross
- Shainah Joseph
- Kristen Moncks
- Alicia Perrin
- Megan Cyr
- Emily Maglio
- Head coach: Tom Black

=== 2019 NORCECA Championship ===
- Jessica Niles
- Kiera Van Ryk
- Kyla Richey
- Danielle Smith
- Alicia Ogoms
- Alexa Gray
- Jennifer Cross
- Brie O'Reilly
- Hilary Howe
- Shainah Joseph
- Kristen Moncks
- Marie-Alex Bélanger
- Alicia Perrin
- Emily Maglio
- Head coach:
  Ben Josephson

=== 2021 FIVB Nations League ===
- Parker Austin
- Cassandra Bujan
- Jennifer Cross
- Alexa Gray
- Hilary Howe
- Shainah Joseph
- Brie O'Reilly
- Caroline Livingston
- Alicia Ogoms
- Emily Maglio
- Andrea Mitrovic
- Kim Robitaille
- Danielle Smith
- Kennedy Snape
- Layne Van Buskirk
- Kiera Van Ryk
- Jazmine White
- Head coach Shannon Winzer

=== 2021 NORCECA Championship ===
- Cassandra Bujan
- Natasha Calkins
- Jennifer Cross
- Hilary Howe
- Brie O'Reilly
- Caroline Livingston
- Alicia Ogoms
- Andrea Mitrovic
- Julia Murmann
- Kim Robitaille
- Vicky Savard
- Layne Van Buskirk
- Kiera Van Ryk
- Jazmine White
- Head coach Shannon Winzer

=== 2023 NORCECA Championship ===
- Kiera Van Ryk
- Vicky Savard
- Julia Murmann
- Jazmine White
- Layne Van Buskirk
- Alicia Ogoms
- Alexa Gray
- Andrea Mitrovic
- Brie O'Reilly
- Hilary Howe
- Shainah Joseph
- Kacey Jost
- Emily Maglio
- Quinn Pelland
- Head coach Shannon Winzer

2023 Olympic Qualification Tournaments

- Kiera Van Ryk
- Vicky Savard
- Julia Murmann
- Jazmine White
- Alicia Ogoms
- Alexa Gray
- Andrea Mitrovic
- Brie King
- Hilary Howe
- Shainah Joseph
- Kacey Jost
- Emily Maglio
- Avery Heppell
- Quinn Pelland
- Head coach Shannon Winzer

2024 FIVB Nations League

- Katerina Georgiadis
- Kiera Van Ryk
- Vicky Savard
- Julia Murmann
- Jazmine White
- Layne Van Buskirk
- Alicia Ogoms
- Alexa Gray
- Courtney Baker
- Andrea Mitrovic
- Jennifer Cross
- Brie King
- Hilary Howe
- Shainah Joseph
- Kacey Jost
- Kim Robitaille
- Emily Maglio
- Lucy Borowski
- Avery Heppell
- Averie Allard
- Emoni Bush
- Quinn Pelland
- Nyadholi Thokbuom
- Raya Surinx
- Kaylee Plouffe
- Madyson Saris
- Jasmine Rivest
- Thana Fayad
- Gabrielle Attieh
- Isabella Noble
- Head coach Shannon Winzer

== See also ==
- Canada men's national volleyball team
- Canada men's junior national volleyball team
