= Pribylov =

Pribylov (masculine, Russian: Прибылов) or Pribylova (feminine, Russian: Прибылова) is a Russian surname. Notable people with the surname include:

- Gavriil Pribylov (died 1796), Russian navigator
- Miroslava Pribylova (born 1970), Canadian volleyball player

== See also ==
- Pribilof Islands
