= Janis Kelly =

Janis Kelly may refer to:

- Janis Kelly (volleyball)
- Janis Kelly (soprano)
