= Josée Corbeil =

Canadian volleyball player (born 1973)

Personal information
- Born: May 25, 1973 (age 53)
Medal record
Women's volleyball
Representing Canada
Pan American Games
Bronze medal – third place	1995 Mar del Plata	Team competition

Josée Corbeil (born May 25, 1973 in Dollard-des-Ormeaux, Quebec) is a retired female volleyball player from Canada women's national volleyball team, who competed for her native country at the 1996 Summer Olympics in Atlanta, Georgia. At the age of 23, she was the youngest player of the Canadian Olympic Team.

Prior to playing for the National Team, she received various national awards:

- Canadian champion 1989, MVP.
- Canadian JR champion 1992 and 1993, MVP.
- Canadian collegiate AAA champion 1992, MVP. Recipient of a 125th Anniversary of the Confederation of Canada Medal, 1992.
- Canadian university rookie of the year 1993.

At the age of 17, she participated in the 1991 World Student Games in Sheffield as well as 1993 in Buffalo and 1997 in Sicily where, as captain, she led the team to a fourth position. She won a bronze medal at the 1995 Pan American Games in Mar del Plata. After her participation at the 1996 Summer Olympics she moved overseas to compete in the professional league of Clamart in France. She was inducted into the Quebec Volleyball hall of fame in 2014.

She retired from the Canadian National Team in 1998. She is the co-founder and owner of the innovative food concept évoilà5 and is a television commentator for beach and indoor volleyball for the Reseau des Sports (RDS) and Radio-Canada television. She commented the 1999 Pan American Games in Winnipeg, the 2000 Olympic Games in Sydney, the 2004 Olympic Games in Athens, the 2008 Olympic Games in Beijing, the 2012 Olympic Games in London, the 2016 Olympic Games in Rio de Janeiro and the 2020 Olympic Games in Tokyo and the 2024 Olympic Games in Paris, amongst various other international events. Corbeil delivers motivational speeches to students, athletes and business corporations; and is a master of ceremony for various events. She is married and has two daughters.
