= Lauren O'Reilly (volleyball) =

Canadian volleyball player (born 1989)

Personal information
- Nationality: Canadian
- Born: 4 April 1989 (age 37)
- Height: 1.78 m (5 ft 10 in)
- Spike: 293 cm (115 in)
- Block: 273 cm (107 in)

Volleyball information
- Number: 19

Career
Years	Teams
2010	Trinity Western University

National team
2010	Canada

Lauren O'Reilly (born 4 April 1989) is a Canadian retired volleyball player. She was part of the Canada women's national volleyball team at the 2010 FIVB Volleyball Women's World Championship in Japan. She played with Trinity Western University.

== Clubs ==
- Trinity Western University (2010)
