= Kathy Tough =

Canadian volleyball player (born 1969)

Kathy Tough (born February 22, 1969, in Calgary, Alberta) is a retired volleyball player from Canada, who competed for her native country at the 1996 Summer Olympics in Atlanta. There she ended up in tenth place with the Women's National Team.
