= Christine Stark =

Canadian volleyball player (born 1970)

Personal information
- Nationality: Canada
- Born: May 8, 1970 (age 56); Winnipeg, Manitoba

National team
| Canada |

Christine Stark (born May 8, 1970 in Winnipeg, Manitoba) is a retired female volleyball player from Canada.

Stark competed for her native country at the 1996 Summer Olympics in Atlanta, Georgia. There the resident of St. François Xavier, Manitoba finished in 10th place with the Women's National Team.
