= Sofía Mercedes =

Dominican Republic volleyball player (born 1976)

Personal information
- Full name: Sofía Esmeralda Mercedes Heredia
- Nationality: Dominican Republic
- Born: May 25, 1976 (age 50); Santo Domingo
- Hometown: Santo Domingo
- Height: 1.85 m (6 ft 1 in)
- Weight: 70 kg (154 lb)
- Spike: 306 cm (120 in)
- Block: 298 cm (117 in)

Volleyball information
- Position: Wing Spiker

National team
2003–2007	Dominican Republic
Honours
Women's volleyball
Representing the Dominican Republic
Pan American Games
Gold medal – first place	2003 Santo Domingo	Team
Pan-American Cup
Silver medal – second place	2005 Santo Domingo	Team
Bronze medal – third place	2007 Colima	Team
NORCECA Championship
Bronze medal – third place	2003 Santo Domingo	Team
- Last updated: July 2010

Sofía Esmeralda Mercedes Heredia born May 25, 1976, in Santo Domingo, is a volleyball player from the Dominican Republic. Sofia Esmeralda won the gold medal with the women's national team at the 2003 Pan American Games in her home town Santo Domingo, Dominican Republic. Playing as a wing-spiker she also competed at the 2004 Summer Olympics for her native country.

She played for the 2003/2004 season with the Italian team Siram Roma. Later that year, she helped the Dominican professional team Los Cachorros to finish in second place for the Dominican Republic 2004 season.

== Clubs ==
- (Italy) Olimpia Teodora Ravenna (1999–2000)
- (Dominican Republic) San Cristóbal (2000–2002)
- (Italy) Siram Roma (2003–2004)
- (Dominican Republic) Los Cachorros (2004)
- (Spain) Ribeira Sacra (2006–2007)
- University of Trinidad and Tobago (2008)

== Awards ==
=== Clubs ===
- 2004 Dominican Republic Distrito Nacional Superior Tournament – Runner-Up, with Los Cachorros
