= Brigitte Soucy =

Canadian volleyball player

Medal record

Women's volleyball

Representing Canada

Pan American Games
Bronze medal – third place	1995 Mar del Plata	Team competition

Brigitte Soucy (born October 11, 1972, in Moncton, New Brunswick) is a retired female volleyball player from Canada.

Soucy competed for her native country at the 1996 Summer Olympics in Atlanta, Georgia. There the resident of Winnipeg, Manitoba finished in 10th place with the Women's National Team after having won the bronze medal a year earlier at the Pan American Games.

After the Olympics she played volleyball in Italy for nine years. She was said to be the best Canadian all-rounder and she was induct into the Volleyball Canada Hall of Fame.
