= Kacey Jost =

Canadian volleyball player (born 2000)

Personal information
- Nationality: Canada
- Born: 15 February 2000 (age 26)
- Hometown: St. Albert, Alberta
- Height: 5 ft 7 in (170 cm)
- Education: UBC Thunderbirds

Volleyball information
- Position: Libero
- Number: 17

National team
2023–present	Canada
Honours
Women's volleyball
Representing the Canada
NORCECA Championship
Gold medal – first place	2026 Santo Domingo	Team
Bronze medal – third place	2023 Quebec City	Team

Kacey Jost (born 15 February 2000) is a Canadian volleyball player for the Canada women's national volleyball team. She was a part of the women's team that competed at the 2023 FIVB Volleyball Women's Olympic Qualification Tournaments. Jost's older brother Tyson is a professional hockey player in the National Hockey League who plays for the Nashville Predators and has previously played for the Colorado Avalanche, Minnesota Wild, Buffalo Sabres, and Carolina Hurricanes.

== University career ==
Jost played U Sports volleyball for the UBC Thunderbirds from 2018 to 2024. She won three U Sports women's volleyball championships in 2019, 2023, and 2024. She was also named the Canada West Libero of the Year for the 2022–23 and 2023–24 seasons.
