= Kerri Buchberger =

Canadian volleyball player (born 1970)

Personal information
- Born: 23 June 1970 (age 56) Russell, Manitoba
- Height: 182 cm (6 ft 0 in)
Medal record
Women's volleyball
Representing Canada
Pan American Games
Bronze medal – third place	1995 Mar del Plata	Team competition

Kerri Buchberger-Kendziora (born June 23, 1970, in Russell, Manitoba) is a retired volleyball player from Canada, who competed for her native country at the 1996 Summer Olympics in Atlanta, Georgia. There the resident of Winnipeg ended up in tenth place with the Women's National Team after having won the bronze medal a year earlier at the Pan American Games. Her brother is Kelly Buchberger, professional ice hockey coach and former player. Her daughter Megan Kendziora committed to play volleyball for the University of Winnipeg Wesmen in 2023.
