= Layne Van Buskirk =

Canadian volleyball player

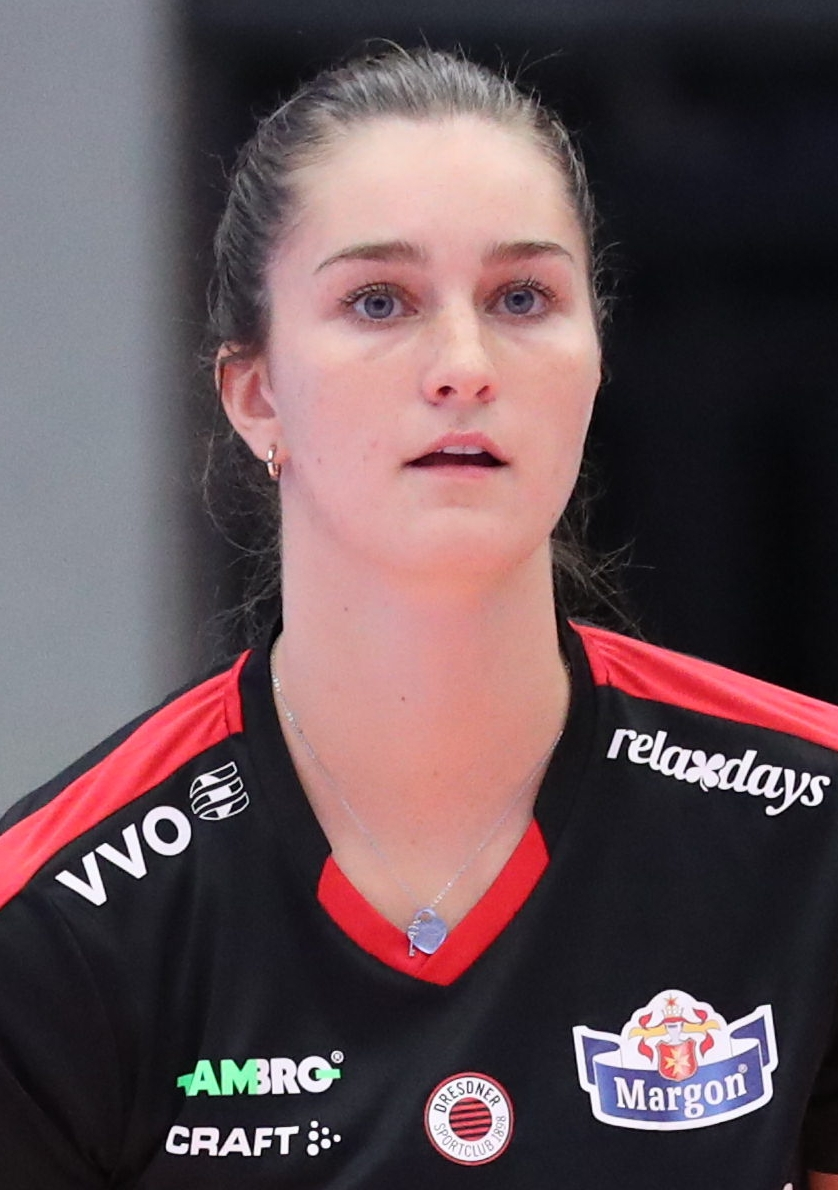

Personal information
- Nationality: Canadian
- Born: February 19, 1998 (age 28); Windsor, Ontario
- Height: 6 ft 4 in (1.93 m)
- Education: (United States) University of Pittsburgh

Volleyball information
- Position: Middle blocker
- Current club: Dallas Pulse
- Number: 7

Career
| Years | Teams |
|---|---|
| 2016–2020; 2020–2021; 2021–2022; 2022–2023; 2023; 2024– | (United States) University of Pittsburgh (France) VBC Chamalières (Germany) Dresdner SC (Germany) Ladies in Black Aachen (Italy) E-Work Busto Arsizio (United States) Vegas Thrill |

National team
| 2017– | Canada |

Layne Van Buskirk (born February 19, 1998) is a Canadian volleyball player, currently playing for the Vegas Thrill of the Pro Volleyball Federation. She played college volleyball from 2016 to 2019 for the Pittsburgh Panthers where she earned honorable mention All-American honors in 2018 and 2019.

== Sporting achievements ==
=== Clubs ===
German Super Cup:

- 2021

=== National team ===
NORCECA Championship:

- 2021
