= Lori Ann Mundt =

Canadian volleyball player (born 1971)

Personal information
- Born: May 19, 1971 (age 55) Yorkton, Saskatchewan, Canada
Medal record
Women's volleyball
Representing Canada
Pan American Games
Bronze medal – third place	1995 Mar del Plata	Team competition

Lori Ann Mundt (born May 19, 1971) is a retired female volleyball player from Canada.

Mundt competed for her native country at the 1996 Summer Olympics in Atlanta, Georgia. There the resident of Winnipeg, Manitoba finished in 10th place with the Women's National Team.
