= Brie O'Reilly =

Canadian women's volleyball player

Brie O’Reilly
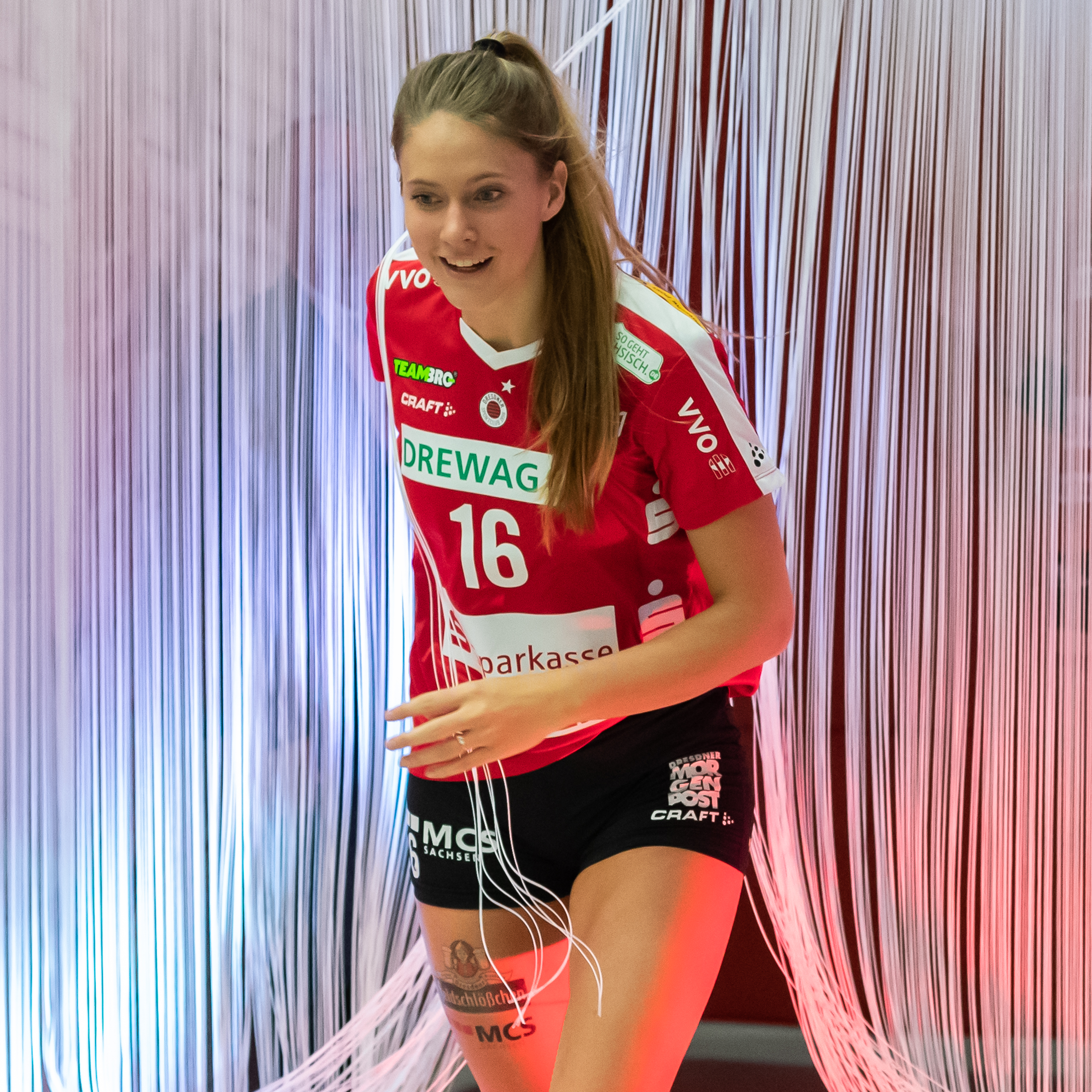
- O’Reilly in 2019.

Personal information
- Nationality: (Canada) Canadian
- Born: Brie Joy O’Reilly; January 24, 1998 (age 28) Langley, British Columbia
- Home town: Langley, British Columbia
- Education: Trinity Western University
- Height: 183 cm (6 ft 0 in)

Volleyball information
- Position: Setter
- Current club: (United States) LOVB Austin
- Number: 13 (national team)

Career
- Years: Team
- 2015–2019: (Canada) Trinity Western
- 2019–2020: (Germany) Dresdner SC
- 2021: (United States) Athletes Unlimited
- 2021–2022: (France) Béziers Volley [fr]
- 2022–2025: (Brazil) Sesc-RJ/Flamengo
- 2025-: (United States) LOVB Austin

National team
- Years: Team
- 2019–present: Canada
Honours
Women's volleyball
Representing Canada
NORCECA Championship
Bronze medal – third place	2019 San Juan	Team
Bronze medal – third place	2021 Guadalajara	Team
NORCECA Champions Cup
Bronze medal – third place	2019 Colorado Springs	Team

Brie Joy Fransen (O'Reilly) (born January 24, 1998) is a Canadian volleyball player and musician. She is part of the Canadian women's national volleyball team. Professionally, she plays for Brazilian club Sesc-RJ/Flamengo.

== Personal life ==
Fransen (O’Reilly) is the youngest of 5 children born to Mark and Laura O'Reilly. Her sister Lauren Carrasco (née O'Reilly) also played volleyball at TWU and for Team Canada. She is a Christian, and attends Christian Life Assembly in Langley with her family. Fransen (O’Reilly) is singer/songwriter. She released her first album entitled First Things First in 2021.

== Career ==
=== College ===
Fransen (O'Reilly) played collegiate volleyball at Trinity Western University in Langley, British Columbia.

=== Professional clubs ===
- (Germany) Dresdner SC
- (United States) Athletes Unlimited (2021)
- (France) Béziers Volley [fr] (2021–2022)
- (Brazil) Sesc-RJ/Flamengo (2022–2025)
- (United States) LOVB Austin (2025–)

=== Canadian national team ===
Fransen (O'Reilly) joined the Canadian national team in 2019. She was named the "Best Setter" at the 2021 Pan-American Cup.

== Awards and honors ==
=== International ===
- 2021 Women's Pan-American Volleyball Cup – Best Setter

== Discography ==
Albums

- First Things First (2023)
- When the Lights Come On - EP (2024)

== Exteneral links ==
- Brie O'Reilly at Volleyball Canada
- Brie O’Reilly at FIVB.com
- Brie O’Reilly at the European Volleyball Confederation
- Brie O’Reilly at Volleyball-Bundesliga (in German)
- Brie O’Reilly at Volleybox
