= Joanne Ross =

Canadian volleyball player (born 1977)

Personal information
- Nationality: Canadian
- Born: 1 November 1977 (age 48)
- Height: 1.96 m (6 ft 5 in)

Volleyball information
- Position: middle blocker
- Number: 10 (national team)

National team
2002	Canada

Joanne Ross (born 1 November 1977) is a Canadian retired female volleyball player, who played as a middle blocker.

She was part of the Canada women's national volleyball team at the 2002 FIVB Volleyball Women's World Championship in Germany.
