= Quinn Pelland =

Canadian national team volleyball player

Personal information
- Nationality: Canada
- Born: 11 May 1999 (age 27)
- Home town: Wanham, Alberta
- Education: Mount Royal University
- Height: 1.80 m (5 ft 11 in)

Volleyball information
- Position: Setter

National team
- Years: Team
- –: Canada
- Updated on September 20, 2023

Quinn Pelland (born 11 May 1999) is a Canadian professional volleyball player. She is part of the Canada women's national volleyball team and competed at the 2023 FIVB Volleyball Women's Olympic Qualification Tournaments.

== Early life and education ==
Pelland was born 11 May 1999 and grew up in Wanham, Alberta. She attended Mount Royal University in Calgary, where she studied Business Administration and Management.

== Career ==
=== University ===
While studying at Mount Royal University, Pelland played for the university's volleyball team. In 2022, she played as team captain and was named to the Canada West First All-Star team and the U Sports Second Team All-Canadian team. In February of the following year, she was named both Canada West and U Sports Volleyball Player of the Week. At the end of the season, she received the university's Brian Fleming Award, which is presented annually to two "student-athletes who excel in academics, athletics and the community". She was also named the women volleyball team's most valuable player.

=== Club ===
In July 2023, Pelland signed a contract to play volleyball professionally with Pays d'Aix Venelles in France. In 2026, Pelland signed a contract to play volleyball professionally with the Minnesota Forge in the United States.

=== International ===
The 2023, Pelland was selected for Volleyball Canada's 2023 Women's NextGen team, which helps prepare players for Canada's women's national volleyball team. She also competed at the 2023 FIVB Volleyball Women's Olympic Qualification Tournaments, where Canada placed third, falling just short of qualifying for the 2024 Summer Olympics.
