= Audrey Vandervelden =

Canadian volleyball player (born 1954)

Audrey Helen Vandervelden (born July 18, 1954 in Vancouver, British Columbia) is a retired volleyball player from Canada.

The 6ft 2in (188 cm) tall Vandervelden competed for her native country in two Summer Olympics: 1976 and 1984. A resident of Surrey, British Columbia she twice finished in 8th place with the Women's National Team.
