= Krista Lee Kinsman =

Canadian volleyball player (born 1978)

Personal information
- Nationality: Canadian
- Born: 1 February 1978 (age 48)
- Hometown: Calgary
- Height: 1.86 m (6 ft 1 in)

Volleyball information
- Position: wing spiker
- Number: 5 (national team)

National team
1996-2003	Canada

Krista Lee Kinsman (born 2 January 1978) is a Canadian retired volleyball player, who played as a wing spiker.

She was part of the Canada women's national volleyball team at the 2002 FIVB Volleyball Women's World Championship in Germany.
