= Ashley Voth =

Canadian volleyball player (born 1988)

Personal information
- Nationality: Canadian
- Born: 24 September 1988 (age 38)
- Height: 1.88 m (6 ft 2 in)
- Weight: 70 kg (154 lb)
- Spike: 308 cm (121 in)
- Block: 283 cm (111 in)

Volleyball information
- Number: 14

Career
Years	Teams
2010	University of Manitoba

National team
2010	Canada

Ashley Voth (born 24 September 1988) is a Canadian retired female volleyball player. She was part of the Canada women's national volleyball team.

She participated in the 2010 FIVB Volleyball Women's World Championship. She played with University of Manitoba.

== Clubs ==
- University of Manitoba (2010)
