= Rae-Anne Mitchell =

Canadian volleyball player (born 1973)

Personal information
- Nationality: Canadian
- Born: 18 March 1974 (age 52); Prince George, British Columbia
- Hometown: Vancouver, British Columbia
- Height: 1.88 m (6 ft 2 in)

Volleyball information
- Position: middle blocker
- Current club: St. Cloud Suresnes
- Number: 13 (national team)

National team
2002	Canada

Rae-Anne Mitchell (born 18 March 1974) is a retired Canadian female volleyball player, who played as a middle blocker.

She was part of the Canada women's national volleyball team at the 2002 FIVB Volleyball Women's World Championship in Germany. On club level she played with St. Cloud Suresnes.

== Clubs ==
- St. Cloud Suresnes (2002)
