= Emily Maglio =

Canadian national team volleyball player (born 1996)

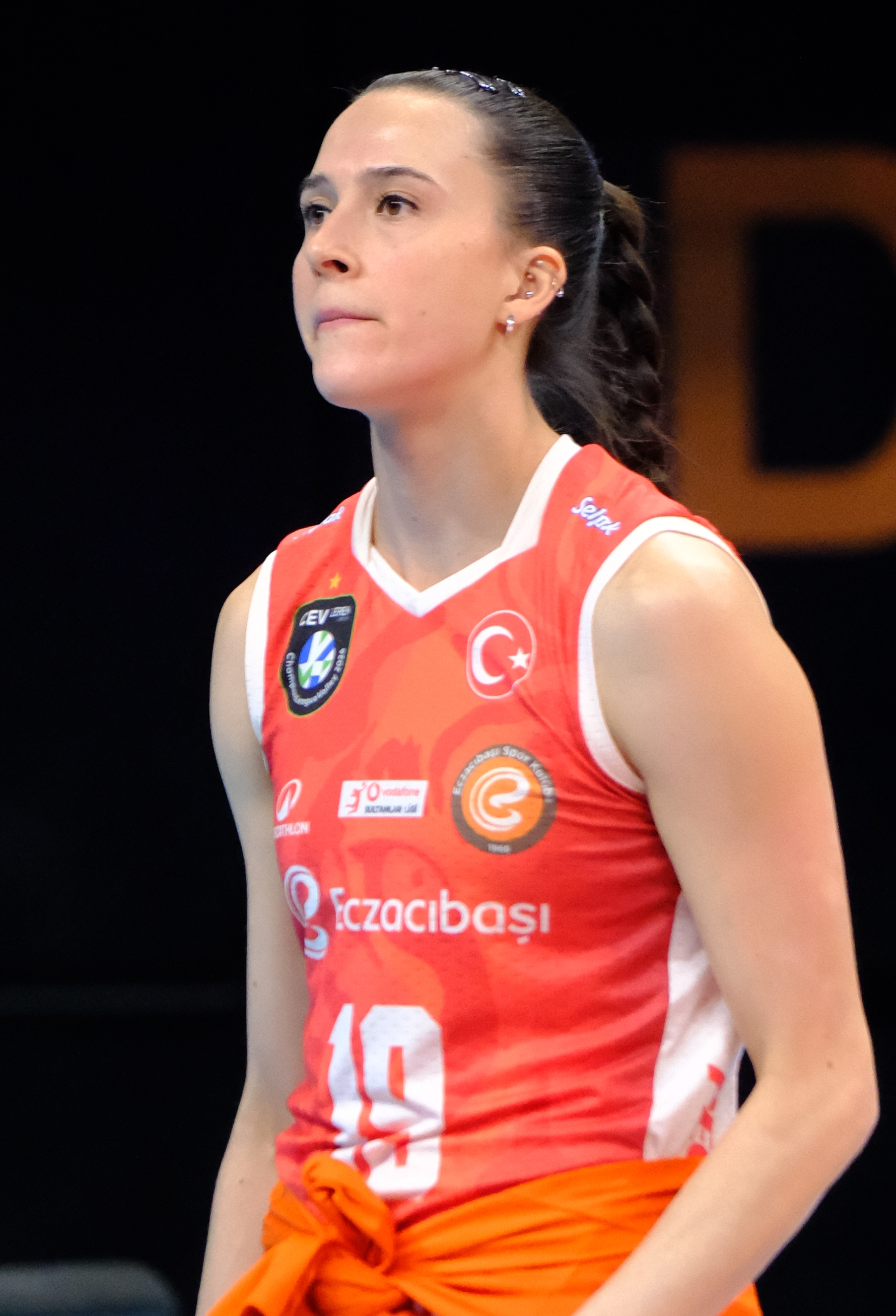

Personal information
- Nationality: Canada
- Born: 13 November 1996 (age 29)
- Hometown: Coquitlam, British Columbia
- Height: 1.91 m (6 ft 3 in)
- Spike: 322 cm (127 in)
- Block: 304 cm (120 in)
- Education: University of Hawaii at Manoa

Volleyball information
- Position: Middle blocker
- Number: 19

Career
Years	Teams
2019-2020	II Bisonte Firenze
2020-2022	Nilüfer Belediyespor
2022-2023	THY
2023-2024	Beşiktaş
2023-2024	Levallois Paris Saint-Cloud
2024-2025	Beşiktaş
2025-2026	Eczacıbaşı
2026-	Vakıfbank

National team
2018 – present	Canada
- Last updated: September 20, 2023

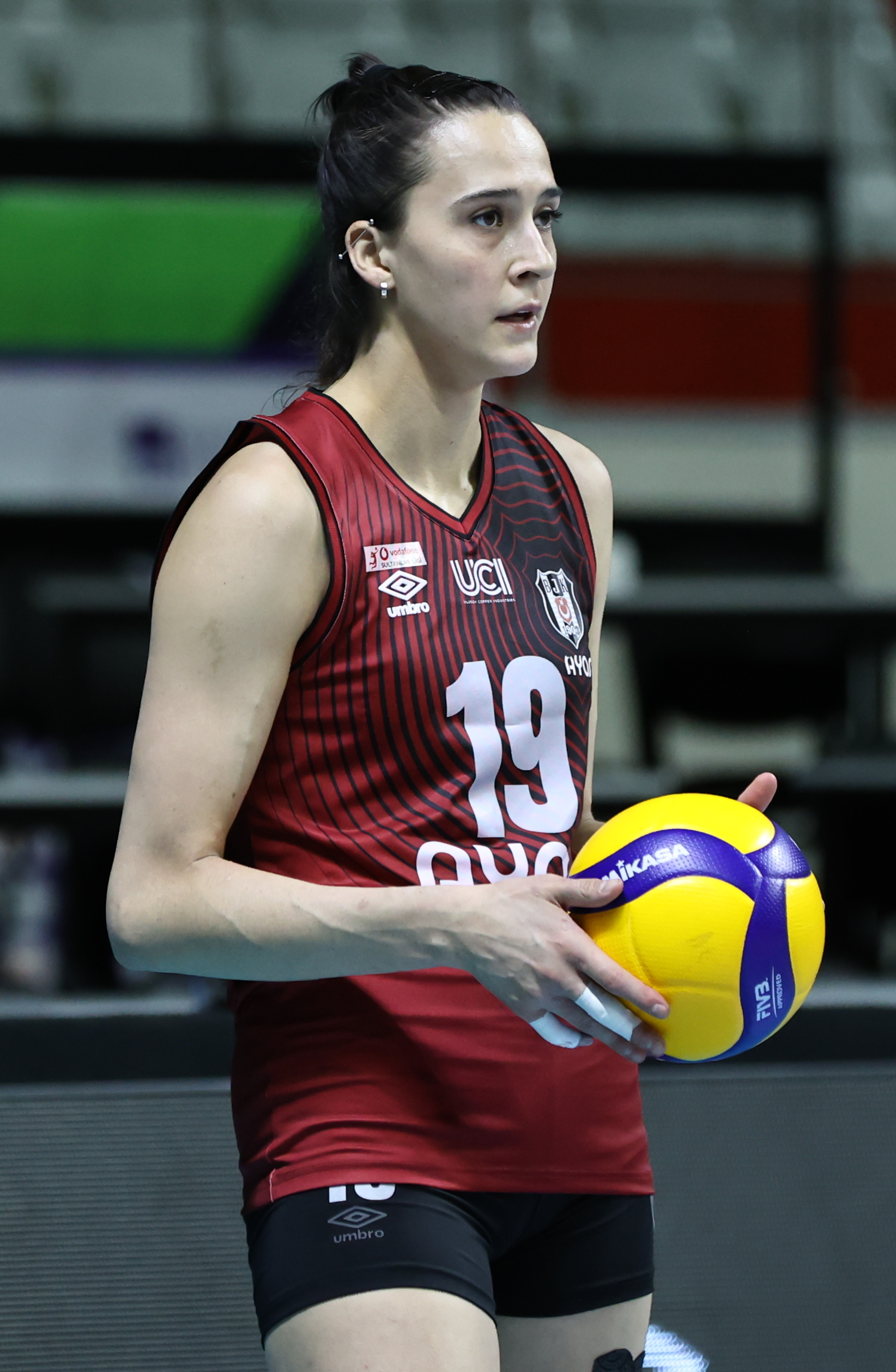

Emily Maglio (born 13 November 1996 in Cranbrook) is a Canadian female volleyball player. She was part of the Canada women's national volleyball team, and participated at the 2018 Women's Pan-American Volleyball Cup, and 2018 FIVB Volleyball Women's World Championship.

She attended Pinetree Secondary School in Coquitlam. She played for the University of Hawaii at Manoa.

Maglio has experience across France, Italy, and has been in Turkiye for several seasons. The Canadian Captain is set to join Vakifbank for the 2026-2027 season
