= Janie Guimond =

Canadian volleyball player (born 1984)

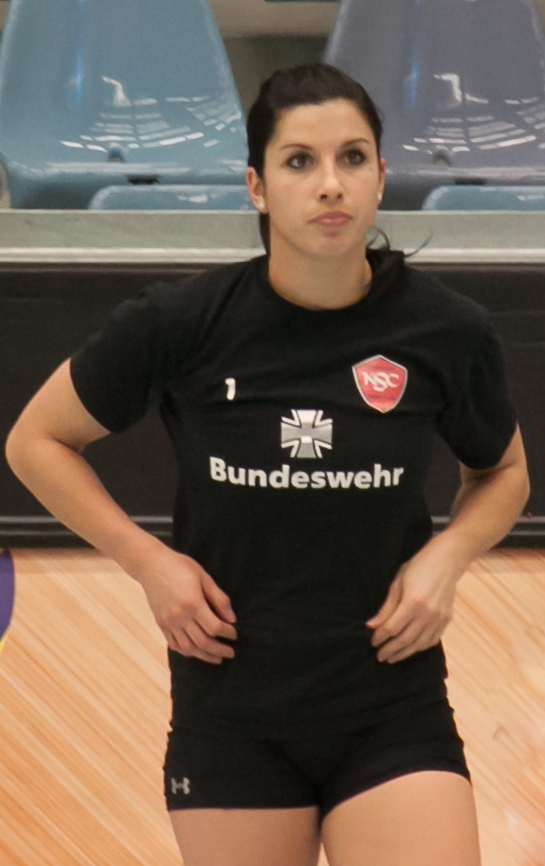

Personal information
- Nationality: Canada
- Born: 11 April 1984 (age 42)
- Height: 1.65 m (5 ft 5 in)
- Spike: 288 cm (113 in)
- Block: 288 cm (113 in)
- Education: Montreal Carabins

Volleyball information
- Number: 1

Career
Years	Teams
2014	(France) Terville Florange

Janie Guimond (born 11 April 1984) is a former Canadian female volleyball player and currently an assistant coach for the Montreal Carabins women's volleyball team.

== University career ==
Guimond played U Sports volleyball for the Montreal Carabins for five seasons from 2003 to 2008 where she finished her career with a silver medal in the national championship in 2008.

== Professional career ==
She was part of the Canadian national team at the 2010 FIVB Volleyball Women's World Championship, and 2014 FIVB Volleyball Women's World Championship in Italy. She was a member of the Canada women's national volleyball team and played for Terville Florange in 2014. She announced her retirement in 2016.

=== Clubs ===
- (France) Terville Florange (2014)

== Awards ==
=== Individuals ===
- 2013 NORCECA Championship "Best Libero"
