= Danielle Smith (volleyball) =

Canadian volleyball player (born 1995)

Personal information
- Nationality: Canada
- Born: 29 April 1990 (age 36); Grande Prairie, Alberta
- Hometown: Beaverlodge, Alberta
- Height: 1.78 m (5 ft 10 in)
- Spike: 291 cm (115 in)
- Block: 271 cm (107 in)

Volleyball information
- Position: Setter

Career
Years	Teams
2018	CSM Targoviste

National team
2013 – present	Canada

Danielle Smith (born 29 April 1990 in Grande Prairie, Alberta) is a Canadian volleyball player. She was part of the Canada women's national volleyball team, and participated at the 2017 FIVB Volleyball Women's World Grand Prix, and 2018 FIVB Volleyball Women's World Championship. She played for five years for the VIU Mariners of the Canadian Collegiate Athletic Association where she won a national championship in 2012.

On a club level she plays for CSM Targoviste.
