= 2007 Women's Pan-American Volleyball Cup =

Tournament details
- Host country: Mexico
- Dates: June 19 to 30 2007
- Teams: 12
- Venue: Polideportivo Universitario (in Colima host cities)

Final positions
- Champions: Cuba (4th title)

Tournament awards
- MVP: (Cuba) Nancy Carrillo

The 2007 Women's Pan-American Volleyball Cup was the sixth edition of the annual women's volleyball tournament, played by twelve countries from June 19 to June 30, 2007, in Colima, Mexico. The intercontinental event served as a qualifier for the 2008 FIVB World Grand Prix in the Yokohama Arena in Yokohama, Japan. The winner of each pool automatically advanced to the semi-finals and the teams placed in second and third met in crossed matches in the quarterfinals round.

== Competing nations ==
Group A	Group B
Argentina; Costa Rica; Dominican Republic; Mexico; Trinidad and Tobago; United States	Brazil; Cuba; Canada; Peru; Puerto Rico; Uruguay

== Preliminary round ==
=== Group A ===
	Team	Points	G	W	L	PW	PL	Ratio	SW	SL	Ratio
1.	United States	10	5	5	0	419	296	1.383	15	3	5.000
2.	Dominican R.	9	5	4	1	407	276	1.475	14	3	4.666
3.	Argentina	8	5	3	2	365	305	1.197	10	6	1.666
4.	Costa Rica	7	5	2	3	324	380	0.855	6	11	0.545
5.	Mexico	6	5	1	4	314	366	0.876	5	12	0.416
6.	Trinidad & T.	5	5	0	5	170	376	0.452	0	15	0.000

- June 21

Dominican R.	3 – 0	Costa Rica	25–21 25–22 25–10
Mexico	3 – 0	Trinidad & T.	25–10 25–19 25–08
United States	3 – 1	Argentina	17–25 25–20 25–23 25–16

- June 22

United States	3 – 0	Costa Rica	25–14 25–15 25–13
Dominican R.	3 – 0	Trinidad & T.	25-07 25-09 25–10
Argentina	3 – 0	Mexico	25–20 25022 25–14

- June 23

Argentina	3 – 0	Trinidad & T.	25–10 25–11 25–12
United States	3 – 2	Dominican R.	25–20 18–25 26–24 18–25 15–13
Costa Rica	3 – 2	Mexico	25–15 15–25 22–25 26–24 16–14

- June 24

United States	3 – 0	Trinidad & T.	25-08 25-09 25–05
Argentina	3 – 0	Costa Rica	25–19 25–15 25–15
Dominican R.	3 – 0	Mexico	25–10 25–16 25–13

- June 25

Costa Rica	3 – 0	Trinidad & T.	25–10 26–24 25–18
Dominican R.	3 – 0	Argentina	25–18 25–18 25–20
United States	3 – 0	Mexico	25–18 25–12 25–11

=== Group B ===
	Team	Points	G	W	L	PW	PL	Ratio	SW	SL	Ratio
1.	Cuba	9	5	4	1	398	302	1.318	14	3	4.666
2.	Brazil	9	5	4	1	392	338	1.160	12	4	3.000
3.	Puerto Rico	9	5	4	1	402	348	1.155	12	5	2.400
4.	Peru	7	5	2	3	353	384	0.919	6	11	0.545
5.	Canada	6	5	1	4	381	403	0.945	6	12	0.500
6.	Uruguay	5	5	0	5	224	375	0.597	0	15	0.000

- June 21

Cuba	3 – 0	Uruguay	25–13 25–11 25–14
Peru	3 – 2	Canada	25–21 21–25 31–29 16–25 16–14
Brazil	3 – 0	Puerto Rico	35–33 25–23 25–19

- June 22

Canada	3 – 0	Uruguay	25–16 25–17 25–13
Brazil	3 – 0	Peru	25–18 25–23 25–16
Puerto Rico	3 – 2	Cuba	20–25 25–15 17–25 25–20 15–13

- June 23

Brazil	3 – 0	Uruguay	25–13 25–16 25–14
Cuba	3 – 0	Canada	25–14 25–16 25–18
Puerto Rico	3 – 0	Peru	25–20 25–16 25–21

- June 24

Puerto Rico	3 – 0	Uruguay	25–17 25–19 25–16
Brazil	3 – 1	Canada	25–22 25–22 23–25 25–19
Cuba	3 – 0	Peru	25–23 25–12 25–20

- June 25

Peru	3 – 0	Uruguay	25–14 25–18 25–13
Puerto Rico	3 – 0	Canada	25–21 25–17 25–18
Cuba	3 – 0	Brazil	25–22 25–19 25–18

== Final round ==
Semi-finals
2007-06-29 – Colima, Mexico
United States	0
Brazil	3
2007-06-29 – Colima, Mexico
Cuba	3
Dominican Republic	0

Final
2007-06-30 – Colima, Mexico
Brazil	0
Cuba	3
3rd place
2007-06-30 – Colima, Mexico
United States	1
Dominican Republic	3

=== Quarterfinals ===
- Wednesday June 27, 2007

Dominican R.	3 – 2	Puerto Rico	25–17 22–25 25–27 25–17 15–07
Brazil	3 – 0	Argentina	25–11 25–18 25–19

=== Semi-finals ===
- Friday June 29, 2007

United States	0 – 3	Brazil	15–25 15–25 18–25
Cuba	3 – 0	Dominican R.	28–26 25–22 25–18

=== Finals ===
- Wednesday June 27, 2007 — Eleventh Place Match

Uruguay	3 – 0	Trinidad & T.	25–20 25–14 25–18

- Wednesday June 27, 2007 — Ninth Place Match

Canada	3 – 1	Mexico	25–12 25–23 25–27 25–22

- Thursday June 28, 2007 — Seventh Place Match

Peru	3 – 0	Costa Rica	25–14 25–17 25–22

- Thursday June 28, 2007 — Fifth Place Match

Puerto Rico	3 – 2	Argentina	21–25 15–25 25–17 25–22 15–10

- Saturday June 30, 2007 — Bronze Medal Match

United States	1 – 3	Dominican R.	19–25 28–26 18–25 26–28

- Saturday June 30, 2007 — Gold Medal Match

Brazil	0 – 3	Cuba	14–25 21–25 20–25

== Final ranking ==
Place	Team
1.	Cuba
2.	Brazil
3.	Dominican Republic
4.	United States
5.	Puerto Rico
6.	Argentina
7.	Peru
8.	Costa Rica
9.	Canada
10.	Mexico
11.	Uruguay
12.	Trinidad and Tobago

2007 Women's Pan-American Cup winners

Cuba
Fourth title

- Cuba, Brazil, Dominican Republic and the United States qualified for the 2008 World Grand Prix

== Awards ==
- Most valuable player
  - (Cuba) Nancy Carrillo
- Best attacker
  - (Cuba) Nancy Carrillo
- Best scorer
  - (Dominican Republic) Bethania de la Cruz
- Best defender
  - (Brazil) Camila Brait
- Best setter
  - (Canada) Larissa Cundy
- Best server
  - (Cuba) Nancy Carrillo
- Best receiver
  - (Peru) Vanessa Palacios
- Best libero
  - (Dominican Republic) Carmen Rosa Caso
- Best blocker
  - (Canada) Sherline Tasha Holness
