= Kenia Moreta =

Dominican Republic volleyball player (born 1981)

Kenia

Personal information
- Full name: Kenia Moreta Pérez
- Nationality: Dominican Republic
- Born: 7 April 1981 (age 45); Santo Domingo
- Hometown: Santo Domingo
- Height: 1.91 m (6 ft 3 in)
- Weight: 70 kg (154 lb)
- Spike: 310 cm (120 in)
- Block: 305 cm (120 in)

Volleyball information
- Position: Middle blocker / Wing Spiker

National team
2002–2007	Dominican Republic
Honours
Women's volleyball
Representing the Dominican Republic
Pan American Games
Gold medal – first place	2003 Santo Domingo	Team
Central American and Caribbean Games
Gold medal – first place	2002 San Salvador	Team
Gold medal – first place	2006 Cartagena	Team
Pan-American Cup
Silver medal – second place	2005 Santo Domingo	Team
NORCECA Championship
Bronze medal – third place	2003 Santo Domingo	Team
Bronze medal – third place	2005 Port of Spain	Team
- Last updated: September 2010

Kenia Moreta Pérez (born 7 April 1981 in Santo Domingo) is a retired volleyball player from the Dominican Republic, who competed for her native country at the 2004 Summer Olympics in Athens, Greece, wearing the number #16 jersey.

There she ended up in eleventh place with the Dominican Republic women's national team. Moreta played as a middle-blocker. She claimed the gold medal with the national squad at the 2003 Pan American Games.

She played during the 2004–2005 for the Italian team Burro Virgilio Gabbioli Curtatone from the A2 Italian Series.

For the 2007–2008 season, she played for the Japanese professional team Denso Airybees.

== Clubs ==
- (Dominican Republic) Mirador (2003–2004)
- (Dominican Republic) Bameso (2005)
- (Italy) Burro Virgilio Gabbioli Curtatone (2004–2005)
- (Japan) Denso Airybees (2007–2008)
