= 2003 Women's NORCECA Volleyball Championship =

Tournament details
- Host country: Dominican Republic
- Dates: September 13–18, 2003
- Teams: 8
- Venue(s): Volleyball Pavilion, Centro Olímpico Juan Pablo Duarte (in Santo Domingo host cities)

Final positions
- Champions: United States (4th title)

Tournament awards
- MVP: (Cuba) Yumilka Ruiz

The 2003 Women's NORCECA Volleyball Championship was the 18th edition of the Women's Continental Volleyball Tournament, played by eight countries from September 13 to September 18, 2003, in Santo Domingo, Dominican Republic.

The United States won the championship, after defeating Cuba 3–0, and both teams qualified to the 2003 FIVB World Cup. The Dominican Republic won the bronze medal.

== Competing nations ==
Group A	Group B
Canada; Dominican Republic; Puerto Rico; Trinidad and Tobago	Costa Rica; Cuba; ~~Mexico~~ — withdrew United States

== Preliminary round ==
=== Group A ===
	Team	Points	G	W	L	PW	PL	Ratio	SW	SL	Ratio
1.	Dominican R.	6	3	3	0	258	188	1.372	9	2	4.500
2.	Canada	5	3	2	1	268	211	1.270	8	4	2.000
3.	Puerto Rico	4	3	1	2	202	219	0.922	4	6	0.666
4.	Trinidad and T.	3	3	0	3	115	225	0.511	0	9	0.000

- September 13

Canada	3 – 0	Trinidad & T.	25-12 25- 9 25–10
Dominican R.	3 – 0	Puerto Rico	25-23 25-16 25–16

- September 14

Puerto Rico	3 – 0	Trinidad & T.	25-15 25-14 25–21
Dominican R.	3 – 2	Canada	22-25 25-20 25-21 21-25 15–08

- September 15

Dominican R.	3 – 0	Trinidad & T.	25-12 25-08 25–14
Canada	3 – 1	Puerto Rico	19-25 25-20 25-10 25–17

=== Group B ===
	Team	Points	G	W	L	PW	PL	Ratio	SW	SL	Ratio
1.	United States	4	2	2	0	178	144	1.236	6	2	3.000
2.	Cuba	3	2	1	1	178	141	1.262	5	3	1.666
3.	Costa Rica	2	2	0	2	79	150	0.526	0	6	0.000
4.	~~Mexico~~	0	0	0	0	0	0	0.000	0	0	0.000

- September 13

Cuba	3 – 0	Costa Rica	25-14 25-11 25–13

- September 14

United States	3 – 0	Costa Rica	25-11 25-11 25–19

- September 15

United States	3 – 2	Cuba	20-25 25-20 25-20 18-25 15–13

== Final round ==
Semi-finals
2003-09-17 – Santo Domingo
Dominican Republic	2
Cuba	3
2003-09-17 – Santo Domingo
United States	3
Canada	0

Final
2003-09-18 – Santo Domingo
Cuba	0
United States	3
3rd place
2003-09-18 – Santo Domingo
Dominican Republic	3
Canada	0

=== Quarter-finals ===
- September 16

Cuba	3 – 0	Puerto Rico	25-06 25-15 25–14
Canada	3 – 0	Costa Rica	25-18 25-08 25–15

=== Semi-finals ===
- September 17

Dominican R.	2 – 3	Cuba	23-25 22-25 25-20 25-20 11–15
United States	3 – 0	Canada	25-16 25-19 25–16

=== Finals ===
- September 17 — Fifth Place Match

Puerto Rico	3 – 2	Costa Rica	25-19 20-25 25-20 19-25 15–13

- September 18 — Bronze Medal Match

Dominican R.	3 – 0	Canada	25-22 25-19 25–21

- September 18 — Gold Medal Match

Cuba	0 – 3	United States	22-25 17-25 28-30

== Final ranking ==
Place	Team
1st place, gold medalist(s)	United States
2nd place, silver medalist(s)	Cuba
3rd place, bronze medalist(s)	Dominican Republic
4.	Canada
5.	Puerto Rico
6.	Costa Rica
7.	Trinidad and Tobago

2003 Women's NORCECA winners

United States
Fourth title

- The United States and Cuba qualified for the 2003 FIVB Women's World Cup

== Individual awards ==
- Most valuable player
  - Yumilka Ruiz (CUB)
- Best spiker
  - Prikeba Phipps (USA)
- Best blocker
  - Annerys Vargas (DOM)
- Best server
  - Zoila Barros (CUB)
- Best digger
  - Amy Tutt (CAN)
- Best setter
  - Robyn Ah Mow-Santos (USA)
- Best receiver
  - Cosiri Rodríguez (DOM)
- Best libero
  - Annie Levesque (CAN)
- Best coach
  - Yoshiaki Toshida (USA)
