= Hilary Howe =

Canadian volleyball player (born 1998)

Personal information
- Nationality: Canada
- Born: 16 June 1998 (age 28)
- Hometown: Calgary, Alberta
- Height: 187 (6 ft 1 in)
- Education: Trinity Western

Volleyball information
- Position: Outside Hitter
- Current club: Minas Tenis Clube
- Number: 14

Career
Years	Teams
2021-2022	Béziers Volley
2022-2023	Ladies in Black
2023-2024	MOYA Radomka Radom
2024-2025	Aydın Büyükşehir Belediyespor
2025-	Minas Tenis Clube

National team
2023 – present	Canada

Hilary Howe (born 16 June 1998) is a Canadian volleyball player for the Canada women's national volleyball team. She was a part of the women's team that competed at the 2023 FIVB Volleyball Women's Olympic Qualification Tournaments.

== Career ==
She played for Trinity Western University for five seasons. Prior to university she attended Dr. E.P. Scarlett High School
