= Gaila González =

Dominican Republic volleyball player (born 1997)

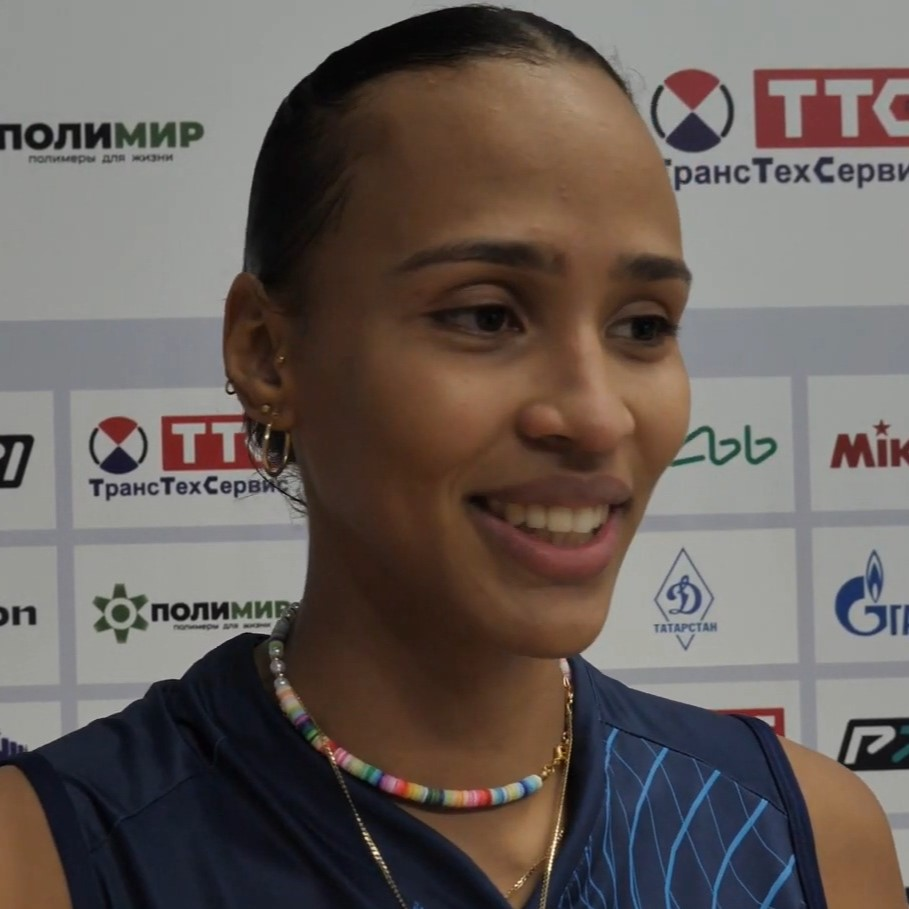
- González in 2022

Personal information
- Full name: Gaila Ceneida González López
- Nationality: Dominican
- Born: June 25, 1997 (age 29)
- Hometown: Santo Domingo
- Height: 1.90 m (6 ft 3 in)
- Weight: 73 kg (161 lb)
- Spike: 304 cm (120 in)
- Block: 276 cm (109 in)

Volleyball information
- Position: Opposite
- Current club: Dinamo Ak-Bars
- Number: 23

Career
Years	Teams
2015–2016	Mirador Volleyball
2016–2017	Capitalinas de San Juan
2017–2019	Cristo Rey Volleyball Club
2018–2019	Aydın Büyükşehir Belediyespor
2019–2020	Kale 1957 Spor
2020–2021	Sigorta Shop Kalecik
2021–2022	Mert Grup Sigorta
2022-2023	Dinamo-Ak Bars
2023-2024	Kuzeyboru
2024-	Dinamo-Ak Bars

National team
2017-present	Dominican Republic
Honours
Women's volleyball
Representing the Dominican Republic
Pan American Games
Gold medal – first place	2023 Santiago	Team
Pan-American Cup
Gold medal – first place	2021 Santo Domingo	Team
Gold medal – first place	2022 Hermosillo	Team
Gold medal – first place	2025 Colima	Team
Central American and Caribbean Games
Gold medal – first place	2026 Santo Domingo	Team
Bolivarian Games
Gold medal – first place	2017 Santa Marta	Team

Gaila Ceneida González López (Note: In this Spanish name, the first or paternal surname is González and the second or maternal family name is López.) (born 25 June 1997) is a Dominican Republic volleyball player. She competed in the 2024 and 2020 Summer Olympics.

== 2026 ==
González helped her national team to win the gold medal at the 2026 Central American and Caribbean Games, the seventh consecutive for her home country. She was awarded tournament's Best Server.

== Awards ==
=== Individual ===
- 2022 Pan American Cup "Best Opposite"
- 2021 NORCECA Championship "Best Opposite"
- 2021 NORCECA Championship "Best Scorer"
- 2021 NORCECA Championship "Most Valuable Player"
- 2021 Pan-American Cup "Best Server"
- 2021 Women's NORCECA Champions Cup "Best Opposite"
- 2017 NORCECA Championship "Best Opposite"
- 2026 Central American and Caribbean Games "Best Server"
