= Jennifer Cross =

Canadian volleyball player

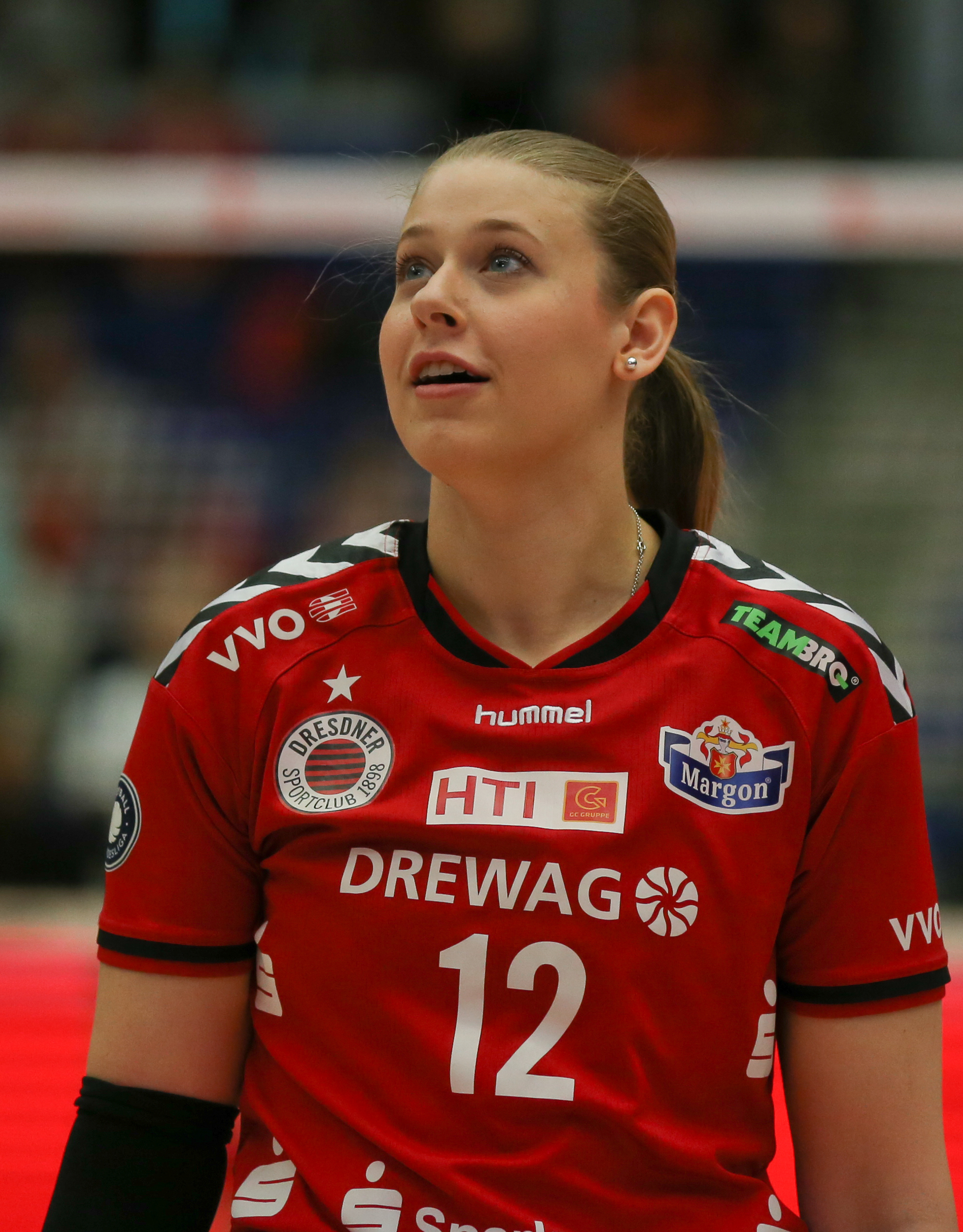

Personal information
- Nationality: Canada
- Born: 4 July 1992 (age 34); Scarborough, Ontario
- Height: 1.95 m (6 ft 5 in)
- Spike: 315 cm (124 in)
- Block: 296 cm (117 in)
- Education: University of Michigan

Volleyball information
- Position: Middle blocker

Career
Years	Teams
2009–2013; 2014-2015; 2015–2017; 2017-2018; 2018–2020; 2020–2021; 2021–2022; 2022–2023; 2023	(United States) Michigan Wolverines (Sweden) Engelholm VS (Germany) Dresdner SC (Hungary) Újpesti TE (Bulgaria) VC Maritza Plovdiv (Turkey) Yeşilyurt (Greece) Panathinaikos (Romania) CS Rapid București (Greece) Panathinaikos

National team
Canada

Jennifer Cross (born 4 July 1992) is a Canadian volleyball player. She is currently a captain on the Canadian national volleyball team. She has also previously played professional volleyball across Europe. She was a 2 time All-American at the University of Michigan, graduating with a degree in Biomechanics (2010-2014). She also competed in the 2017 FIVB Volleyball World Grand Prix.

She attended high school at Birchmount Park Collegiate Institute, as a member of the Birchmount Exceptional Athlete Program (BEAP).

== Clubs ==
- 2014-2015: Engelholm Volleyboll Sällskap - Sweden,
- 2015-2017: Dresden Sports Club - Germany
- 2017-2018: UTE-Budapest, Hungary
- 2018-2020: Maritza Plovdiv
- 2020-2021: Yeşilyurt
- 2021-2022: Panathinaikos
- 2022-2023: CS Rapid București
- 2023: Panathinaikos

== Titles ==
=== National championships ===
- 2021/2022 Greek Championship, with Panathinaikos
- 2022/2023 Greek Championship, with Panathinaikos

=== National cups ===
- 2021/2022 Greek Cup, with Panathinaikos
