= Jennifer Rauh =

Canadian volleyball player (born 1971)

Personal information
- Nationality: Canadian
- Born: 1 July 1971 (age 55)
- Height: 1.82 m (6 ft 0 in)

Volleyball information
- Position: Wing spiker
- Current club: Herentals VBC
- Number: 11 (national team)

National team
2002	Canada

Jennifer Rauh (born 1 July 1971) is a Canadian retired female volleyball player, who played as a wing spiker.

She was part of the Canada women's national volleyball team at the 2002 FIVB Volleyball Women's World Championship in Germany. On club level she played with Herentals VBC.

== Clubs ==
- Herentals VBC (2002)
