= Carla Bradstock =

Canadian volleyball player and coach

Personal information
- Nationality: Canadian
- Born: 11 August 1985 (age 41); Vancouver, BC
- Hometown: Richmond, BC
- Height: 1.78 m (5 ft 10 in)
- Spike: 282 cm (111 in)
- Block: 271 cm (107 in)
- Education: University of British Columbia

Volleyball information
- Position: Setter
- Number: 8

Career
| Years | Teams |
|---|---|
| 2010 | Team Canada |

National team
| 2008, 2010, 2011, 2012 | Canada |

Carla Bradstock (born 11 August 1985) was a Canadian volleyball player and coach.

== Career ==
She was part of the Canada women's national volleyball team in several tournaments over her years with Canada, including the 2008 FISU Games, and the 2010 FIVB Volleyball Women's World Championship in Japan. In 2011, Carla played in the PanAm Games in Guadalajara, Mexico. She was also training on the Olympic Qualification team, but Canada did not qualify for the Games in 2012. Bradstock also played professional volleyball in Sollentuna, Sweden; Linz, Austria; and Baku, Azerbaijan. Previous to playing professionally, she was the MVP at the 2008 Canadian university national championship, with a gold medal finish in her final year for the University of British Columbia.

After retiring from volleyball, Bradstock went on to be a delegate for Miss Universe Canada in 2012.

== Clubs ==
- Team Canada (2008, 2010, 2011, 2012)
- Team Shirvan (2011)
- Team Linz (2010)
- Team Sollentuna (2009)
- University of British Columbia (2003-2008)
