= 2023 Women's NORCECA Volleyball Championship =

International volleyball contest

2023 Women's NORCECA Championship

Tournament details
- Host country: Canada
- City: Quebec City
- Dates: 29 August – 3 September 2023
- Teams: 7
- Venue: 1 (in 1 host city)

Final positions
- Champions: Dominican Republic (4th title)
- Runners-up: United States
- Third place: Canada
- Fourth place: Cuba

Tournament awards
- MVP: (Dominican Republic) Brenda Castillo
- Best Setter: (Canada) Brie King
- Best OH: (Canada) Kiera Van Ryk (Canada) Alexa Gray
- Best MB: (Puerto Rico) Neira Ortiz (Canada) Emily Maglio
- Best OPP: (United States) Jordan Thompson
- Best Libero: (Dominican Republic) Brenda Castillo

Tournament statistics
- Matches played: 17
- Attendance: 17,789 (1,046 per match)
- Best scorer: (Puerto Rico) Paola Santiago
- Best server: (Dominican Republic) Lisvel Elisa Eve
- Best digger: (Dominican Republic) Brenda Castillo
- Best receiver: (United States) Justine Wong-Orantes

The 2023 Women's NORCECA Volleyball Championship was the 28th edition of the tournament, and was played from 29 August to 3 September 2023 in Quebec City, Canada. The top three teams of the tournament qualified for the 2025 FIVB Volleyball Women's World Championship as the NORCECA representatives.

== Competing nations ==
The following national teams have qualified:

| Pool A | Pool B |
|---|---|
| Canada | Costa Rica |
| Mexico | Cuba |
| Puerto Rico | Dominican Republic |
| | United States |

== Pool standing procedure ==
1. Number of matches won
2. Match points
3. Points ratio
4. Sets ratio
5. Result of the last match between the tied teams

Match won 3–0: 5 match points for the winner, 0 match points for the loser
Match won 3–1: 4 match points for the winner, 1 match point for the loser
Match won 3–2: 3 match points for the winner, 2 match points for the loser

== Preliminary round ==
=== Pool A ===
| Pos | Team | Pld | W | L | Pts | SPW | SPL | SPR | SW | SL | SR | Qualification |
|---|---|---|---|---|---|---|---|---|---|---|---|---|
| 1 | Canada (H) | 2 | 2 | 0 | 10 | 150 | 112 | 1.339 | 6 | 0 | MAX | Semifinals |
| 2 | Puerto Rico | 2 | 1 | 1 | 3 | 152 | 184 | 0.826 | 3 | 5 | 0.600 | Quarterfinals |
| 3 | Mexico | 2 | 0 | 2 | 2 | 167 | 173 | 0.965 | 2 | 6 | 0.333 | Quarterfinals |

Source: FIVB Live Center
(H) Host

| Date | Time | | Score | | Set 1 | Set 2 | Set 3 | Set 4 | Set 5 | Total | Report |
|---|---|---|---|---|---|---|---|---|---|---|---|
| 29 Aug | 19:30 | Canada | 3–0 | Mexico | 25–20 | 25–18 | 25–20 | | | 75–58 | P2 P3 |
| 30 Aug | 19:30 | Puerto Rico | 0–3 | Canada | 18–25 | 13–25 | 23–25 | | | 54–75 | P2 P3 |
| 31 Aug | 17:00 | Puerto Rico | 3–2 | Mexico | 27–25 | 17–25 | 14–25 | 25–23 | 15–11 | 98–109 | P2 P3 |

=== Pool B ===
| Pos | Team | Pld | W | L | Pts | SPW | SPL | SPR | SW | SL | SR | Qualification |
|---|---|---|---|---|---|---|---|---|---|---|---|---|
| 1 | United States | 3 | 3 | 0 | 15 | 225 | 120 | 1.875 | 9 | 0 | MAX | Semifinals |
| 2 | Dominican Republic | 3 | 2 | 1 | 10 | 210 | 156 | 1.346 | 6 | 3 | 2.000 | Quarterfinals |
| 3 | Cuba | 3 | 1 | 2 | 5 | 161 | 188 | 0.856 | 3 | 6 | 0.500 | Quarterfinals |
| 4 | Costa Rica | 3 | 0 | 3 | 0 | 93 | 225 | 0.413 | 0 | 9 | 0.000 | 6th place match |

Source: FIVB Live Center

| Date | Time | | Score | | Set 1 | Set 2 | Set 3 | Set 4 | Set 5 | Total | Report |
|---|---|---|---|---|---|---|---|---|---|---|---|
| 29 Aug | 13:30 | United States | 3–0 | Costa Rica | 25–3 | 25–13 | 25–5 | | | 75–21 | P2 P3 |
| 29 Aug | 17:00 | Dominican Republic | 3–0 | Cuba | 25–14 | 25–17 | 25–16 | | | 75–47 | P2 P3 |
| 30 Aug | 13:30 | Cuba | 0–3 | United States | 8–25 | 17–25 | 14–25 | | | 39–75 | P2 P3 |
| 30 Aug | 17:00 | Costa Rica | 0–3 | Dominican Republic | 13–25 | 11–25 | 10–25 | | | 34–75 | P2 P3 |
| 31 Aug | 13:30 | Cuba | 3–0 | Costa Rica | 25–18 | 25–11 | 25–9 | | | 75–38 | P2 P3 |
| 31 Aug | 19:30 | United States | 3–0 | Dominican Republic | 25–22 | 25–22 | 25–16 | | | 75–60 | P2 P3 |

== Final round ==
Quarterfinals
1 September
Dominican Republic | 3
Mexico | 0
1 September
Puerto Rico | 0
Cuba | 3

Semifinals
2 September
Canada | 1
Dominican Republic | 3
2 September
United States | 3
Cuba | 0

Final
3 September
Dominican Republic | 3
United States | 2
3rd place match
3 September
Canada | 3
Cuba | 1

| 5th place match |
| 2 September |
| Mexico | 3 |
| Puerto Rico | 0 |

| 6th place match |
| 3 September |
| Puerto Rico | 3 |
| Costa Rica | 0 |

=== Quarterfinals ===
| Date | Time | | Score | | Set 1 | Set 2 | Set 3 | Set 4 | Set 5 | Total | Report |
|---|---|---|---|---|---|---|---|---|---|---|---|
| 1 Sep | 17:00 | Puerto Rico | 0–3 | Cuba | 21–25 | 23–25 | 22–25 | | | 66–75 | P2 P3 |
| 1 Sep | 19:30 | Dominican Republic | 3–0 | Mexico | 25–17 | 25–10 | 25–12 | | | 75–39 | P2 P3 |

=== 5th place match ===
| Date | Time | | Score | | Set 1 | Set 2 | Set 3 | Set 4 | Set 5 | Total | Report |
|---|---|---|---|---|---|---|---|---|---|---|---|
| 2 Sep | 13:30 | Mexico | 3–0 | Puerto Rico | 25–22 | 32–30 | 25–22 | | | 82–74 | P2 P3 |

=== Semifinals ===
| Date | Time | | Score | | Set 1 | Set 2 | Set 3 | Set 4 | Set 5 | Total | Report |
|---|---|---|---|---|---|---|---|---|---|---|---|
| 2 Sep | 17:00 | United States | 3–0 | Cuba | 25–12 | 25–11 | 25–16 | | | 75–39 | P2 P3 |
| 2 Sep | 19:30 | Canada | 1–3 | Dominican Republic | 25–27 | 22–25 | 25–23 | 20–25 | | 92–100 | P2 P3 |

=== 6th place match ===
| Date | Time | | Score | | Set 1 | Set 2 | Set 3 | Set 4 | Set 5 | Total | Report |
|---|---|---|---|---|---|---|---|---|---|---|---|
| 3 Sep | 11:30 | Puerto Rico | 3–0 | Costa Rica | 25–13 | 25–7 | 25–9 | | | 75–29 | P2 P3 |

=== 3rd place match ===
| Date | Time | | Score | | Set 1 | Set 2 | Set 3 | Set 4 | Set 5 | Total | Report |
|---|---|---|---|---|---|---|---|---|---|---|---|
| 3 Sep | 15:00 | Canada | 3–1 | Cuba | 25–21 | 25–17 | 17–25 | 25–16 | | 92–79 | P2 P3 |

=== Final ===
| Date | Time | | Score | | Set 1 | Set 2 | Set 3 | Set 4 | Set 5 | Total | Report |
|---|---|---|---|---|---|---|---|---|---|---|---|
| 3 Sep | 17:30 | Dominican Republic | 3–2 | United States | 12–25 | 25–21 | 19–25 | 25–19 | 15–13 | 96–103 | P2 P3 |

== Final standing ==
| Rank | Team |
|---|---|
| 1st place, gold medalist(s) | Dominican Republic |
| 2nd place, silver medalist(s) | United States |
| 3rd place, bronze medalist(s) | Canada |
| 4 | Cuba |
| 5 | Mexico |
| 6 | Puerto Rico |
| 7 | Costa Rica |

| Qualified for the 2025 World Championship |
| Qualified for the 2025 World Championship via FIVB World Ranking |

2023 Women's NORCECA champions

Dominican Republic
4th title

== Awards ==
- Most valuable player
  Brenda Castillo (DOM)
- Best setter
  Brie King (CAN)
- Best outside spikers
  Kiera Van Ryk (CAN)
  Alexa Gray (CAN)
- Best opposite spiker
  Jordan Thompson (USA)
- Best middle blockers
  Neira Ortiz (PUR)
  Emily Maglio (CAN)
- Best libero
  Brenda Castillo (DOM)
- Best scorer
  Paola Santiago (PUR)
- Best receiver
  Justine Wong-Orantes (USA)
- Best server
  Lisvel Elisa Eve (DOM)
- Best digger
  Brenda Castillo (DOM)

== See also ==
- 2023 Men's NORCECA Volleyball Championship
