= Courtney Baker =

Canadian volleyball player (born 1997)

Personal information
- Born: 14 July 1997 (age 29)
- Hometown: Bridgewater, Nova Scotia
- Height: 180 cm (5 ft 11 in)
- Weight: 68 kg (150 lb)
- Spike: 309 cm (122 in)
- Block: 290 cm (114 in)
- Education: Dalhousie University

Volleyball information
- Position: Setter
- Current club: (France) RC Cannes

Career
Years	Teams
2015–2020	(Canada) Dalhousie University
2020–2021	(Hungary) Szent Benedek RA
2021–2022	(Finland) Puijo Wolley
2022–2023	(Hungary) Szent Benedek RA
2023–2024	(France) Terville-Florange OC
2024–2025	(France) RC Cannes
- Last updated: 5 July 2024

Courtney Baker (born 14 July 1997) is a Canadian volleyball player from Bridgewater, Nova Scotia who plays as a setter for the Canada women's national volleyball team.

== Career ==
Baker competed at the 2022 FIVB Volleyball Women's Nations League.

She has played for Dalhousie University, Szent Benedek RA, Puijo Wolley, and Terville-Florange OC. As of July 2024, she plays for RC Cannes.
