= Brittney Page =

Canadian volleyball player (born 1984)

Personal information
- Nationality: Canadian
- Born: 4 February 1984 (age 42); Kelowna, British Columbia
- Height: 1.84 m (6 ft 0 in)
- Spike: 309 cm (122 in)
- Block: 292 cm (115 in)

Volleyball information
- Number: 3

Career
Years	Teams
2014	SC Potsdam

Brittney Page (born 4 February 1984) is a Canadian female volleyball player. She is a member of the Canada women's national volleyball team and played for SC Potsdam in 2014. She was part of the Canadian national team at the 2014 FIVB Volleyball Women's World Championship in Italy.

== Clubs ==
- (Germany) SC Potsdam (2014)
