= Miroslava Pribylova =

Canadian volleyball player (born 1970)

Personal information
- Nationality: Canadian
- Born: 15 August 1970 (age 56)
- Height: 1.78 m (5 ft 10 in)

Volleyball information
- Position: setter
- Current club: SSV Ulm Aliud Pharma
- Number: 9 (national team)

National team
2002	Canada

Miroslava Pribylova (born 15 August 1970) is a Canadian retired volleyball player, who played as a setter.

She was part of the Canada women's national volleyball team at the 2002 FIVB Volleyball Women's World Championship in Germany. On club level she played with SSV Ulm Aliud Pharma.

== Clubs ==
- SSV Ulm Aliud Pharma (2002)
