= Janis Kelly (volleyball) =

Canadian volleyball player (born 1971)

Personal information
- Born: March 20, 1971 (age 55) Winnipeg, Manitoba
Medal record
Women's volleyball
Representing Canada
Pan American Games
Bronze medal – third place	1995 Mar del Plata	Team competition

Janis Louise Kelly (born March 20, 1971, in Winnipeg, Manitoba) is a retired volleyball player from Canada.

She competed for her native country at the 1996 Summer Olympics in Atlanta, Georgia. There she finished in 10th place with the Women's National Team. She competed at the 2002 FIVB Volleyball Women's World Championship in Germany.
