= Barb Bellini =

Canadian volleyball player (born 1977)

Personal information
- Nationality: Canadian
- Born: 14 March 1977 (age 49)
- Height: 1.85 m (6 ft 1 in)

Volleyball information
- Position: Wing spiker

National team
2002-2005	Canada

Barb Bellini (born 14 March 1977) is a Canadian retired female volleyball player, who played as a wing spiker.

== Career ==
She was part of the Canada women's national volleyball team at the 2002 FIVB Volleyball Women's World Championship in Germany. On club level she played with the Puerto Rican club Criollas de Caguas, winning the 2002 league championship.

== Clubs ==
- (Puerto Rico) Criollas de Caguas (2002)
