= Amy Nicole Tutt =

Canadian volleyball player (born 1976)

Personal information
- Nationality: Canadian
- Born: 25 April 1976 (age 50)
- Height: 1.82 m (6 ft 0 in)

Volleyball information
- Position: wing spiker
- Current club: Club Voleibol Benidorm
- Number: 3 (national team)

National team
2002	Canada

Amy Nicole Tutt (born 25 April 1976) is a retired Canadian volleyball player, who played as a wing spiker. She was part of the Canada women's national volleyball team.

She participated at the 2002 FIVB Volleyball Women's World Championship in Germany. and the 2003 FIVB World Grand Prix. On club level she played with Club Voleibol Benidorm.

== Clubs ==
- Club Voleibol Benidorm (2002)
