= Anne-Marie Lemieux =

Canadian volleyball player (born 1976)

Personal information
- Nationality: Canadian
- Born: 23 July 1976 (age 50)
- Height: 1.78 m (5 ft 10 in)

Volleyball information
- Position: setter
- Number: 6 (national team)

National team
2002-2006	Canada

Anne-Marie Lemieux (born 23 July 1976) is a retired Canadian female volleyball player, who played as a setter.

She was part of the Canada women's national volleyball team at the 2002 FIVB Volleyball Women's World Championship in Germany.
