= 2021 Women's NORCECA Volleyball Championship =

2021 Women's NORCECA Championship
Tournament details
- Host country: Mexico
- Dates: 26 – 31 August
- Teams: 7
- Venue: 1 (in 1 host city)

Final positions
- Champions: Dominican Republic (3rd title)

Tournament awards
- MVP: (Dominican Republic) Gaila González
- Best Setter: (Puerto Rico) Natalia Valentín
- Best OH: (Dominican Republic) Prisilla Rivera (Dominican Republic) Bethania De La Cruz
- Best MB: (United States) Rachael Kramer (Canada) Jennifer Cross
- Best OPP: (Dominican Republic) Gaila González
- Best Libero: (Puerto Rico) Shara Venegas

Tournament statistics
- Best scorer: (Dominican Republic) Gaila González (79 points)

The 2021 Women's NORCECA Volleyball Championship was the 27th edition of the tournament, and was played from 26 August to 31 August 2021 in Guadalajara, Mexico. The champion and first runner-ups will qualify for the 2022 FIVB Volleyball Women's World Championship.

== Competing nations ==
The following national teams have qualified:

Pool A	Pool B
Puerto Rico	Trinidad and Tobago
Canada	Dominican Republic
United States	Mexico
	Costa Rica

== Pool standing procedure ==
1. Number of matches won
2. Match points
3. Points ratio
4. Sets ratio
5. Result of the last match between the tied teams

Match won 3–0: 5 match points for the winner, 0 match points for the loser
Match won 3–1: 4 match points for the winner, 1 match point for the loser
Match won 3–2: 3 match points for the winner, 2 match points for the loser

== Preliminary round ==
=== Pool A ===
Pos	Team	Pld	W	L	Pts	SPW	SPL	SPR	SW	SL	SR	Qualification
1	Canada	2	1	1	6	189	178	1.062	5	4	1.250	Semifinals
2	United States	2	1	1	5	203	200	1.015	5	5	1.000	Quarterfinals
3	Puerto Rico	2	1	1	4	189	203	0.931	4	5	0.800	Quarterfinals

Date	Time		Score		Set 1	Set 2	Set 3	Set 4	Set 5	Total	Report
26 Aug	14:00	United States	2–3	Puerto Rico	25–21	26–28	19–25	25–21	9–15	104–110	P2P3
27 Aug	17:30	United States	3–2	Canada	25–17	15–25	19–25	25–15	15–8	99–90	P2P3
28 Aug	17:30	Puerto Rico	1–3	Canada	17–25	22–25	26–24	14–25		79–99	P2P3

=== Pool B ===
Pos	Team	Pld	W	L	Pts	SPW	SPL	SPR	SW	SL	SR	Qualification
1	Dominican Republic	3	3	0	14	259	172	1.506	9	1	9.000	Semifinals
2	Mexico	3	2	1	11	241	188	1.282	8	4	2.000	Quarterfinals
3	Costa Rica	3	1	2	5	169	177	0.955	5	8	0.625	Quarterfinals
4	Trinidad and Tobago	3	0	3	0	93	225	0.413	0	9	0.000	

Date	Time		Score		Set 1	Set 2	Set 3	Set 4	Set 5	Total	Report
26 Aug	17:30	Dominican Republic	3–0	Costa Rica	25–11	25–21	25–15			75–47	P2P3
26 Aug	20:00	Mexico	3–0	Trinidad and Tobago	25–13	25–9	25–10			75–32	P2P3
27 Aug	14:00	Dominican Republic	3–0	Trinidad and Tobago	25–5	25–17	25–12			75–34	P2P3
27 Aug	20:00	Mexico	3–0	Costa Rica	25–14	25–12	25–21			75–47	P2P3
28 Aug	14:00	Trinidad and Tobago	0–3	Costa Rica	13–25	4–25	10–25			27–75	P2P3
28 Aug	20:00	Mexico	1–3	Dominican Republic	30–28	19–25	13–25	29–31		91–109	P2P3

== Final round ==
Quarterfinals
29 August
Mexico	1
Puerto Rico	3
29 August
United States	3
Costa Rica	0

Semifinals
30 August
Canada	1
Puerto Rico	3
30 August
Dominican Republic	3
United States	0

Final
31 August
Puerto Rico	2
Dominican Republic	3
3rd place
31 August
Canada	3
United States	2

5th place
30 August
Costa Rica	0
Mexico	3

=== Quarterfinals ===
Date	Time		Score		Set 1	Set 2	Set 3	Set 4	Set 5	Total	Report
29 Aug	17:30	United States	3–0	Costa Rica	25–11	25–17	25–10			75–38	P2P3
29 Aug	20:00	Mexico	1–3	Puerto Rico	22–25	19–25	27–25	23–25		91–100	P2P3

=== Fifth place match ===
Date	Time		Score		Set 1	Set 2	Set 3	Set 4	Set 5	Total	Report
30 Aug	14:00	Costa Rica	0–3	Mexico	15–25	10–25	15–25			40–75	P2P3

=== Semifinals ===
Date	Time		Score		Set 1	Set 2	Set 3	Set 4	Set 5	Total	Report
30 Aug	17:30	Canada	1–3	Puerto Rico	18–25	25–19	23–25	20–25		86–94	P2P3
30 Aug	20:00	Dominican Republic	3–0	United States	25–16	25–18	25–20			75–54	P2P3

=== 3rd place match ===
Date	Time		Score		Set 1	Set 2	Set 3	Set 4	Set 5	Total	Report
31 Aug	17:30	Canada	3–2	United States	25–17	17–25	25–22	23–25	15–8	105–97	P2P3

=== Final ===
Date	Time		Score		Set 1	Set 2	Set 3	Set 4	Set 5	Total	Report
31 Aug	20:00	Puerto Rico	2–3	Dominican Republic	22–25	25–15	17–25	25–21	12–15	101–101	P2P3

== Final standing ==
Rank	Team
1st place, gold medalist(s)	Dominican Republic
2nd place, silver medalist(s)	Puerto Rico
3rd place, bronze medalist(s)	Canada
4	United States
5	Mexico
6	Costa Rica
7	Trinidad and Tobago

Qualified for the 2022 World Championship

2021 Women's NORCECA champions

Dominican Republic
3rd title

== Awards ==
- Most valuable player
  - Gaila González (DOM)
- Best scorer
  - Gaila González (DOM)
- Best server
  - Jocelyn Urías (MEX)
- Best digger
  - María José Castro (CRC)
- Best receiver
  - Shara Venegas (PUR)
- Best setter
  - Natalia Valentín (PUR)
- Best outside spikers
  - Prisilla Rivera (DOM)
  - Bethania De La Cruz (DOM)
- Best middle blockers
  - Rachael Kramer (USA)
  - Jennifer Cross (CAN)
- Best opposite spiker
  - Gaila González (DOM)
- Best libero
  - Shara Venegas (PUR)

== See also ==
- 2021 Men's NORCECA Volleyball Championship
