= Nancy Carrillo =

Cuban volleyball player (born 1986)

Nancy Carrillo de la Paz

Personal information
- Full name: Nancy Carillo de la Paz
- Born: 11 January 1986 (age 40); Havana, Cuba
- Height: 1.90 m (6 ft 3 in)
- Spike: 320 cm (130 in)
- Block: 315 cm (124 in)

Volleyball information
- Position: Middle blocker / Opposite
- Number: 3
Honours
Women's volleyball
Representing Cuba
Olympic Games
Bronze medal – third place	2004 Athens	Team
FIVB World Grand Prix
Silver medal – second place	Yokohama 2008
NORCECA Championship
Gold medal – first place	2007 Winnipeg
Silver medal – second place	2005 Port of Spain
Bronze medal – third place	2009 Bayamón
Pan-American Cup
Gold medal – first place	2007 Colima
Pan American Games
Gold medal – first place	2007 Rio de Janeiro	Team
Silver medal – second place	2003 Santo Domingo	Team
Central American and Caribbean Games
Silver medal – second place	2006 Cartagena	Team

Nancy Carillo de la Paz (born 11 January 1986, in Havana) is a volleyball player from Cuba.

Carrillo de la Paz represented her native country at the 2004 Summer Olympics in Athens, Greece, where she won the bronze medal with the national team in the women's team competition. She participated in the 2006 FIVB Volleyball Women's World Championship.

Carrillo de la Paz was named the "Best Server" at the 2002 World Championship.

== Awards ==
=== Individuals ===
- 2002 Pan-American Cup "Best Spiker"
- 2002 Pan-American Cup "Best Server"
- 2002 World Championship "Best Server"
- 2003 Pan-American Games "Best Attacker"
- 2005 FIVB World Grand Prix "Best Blocker"
- 2005 NORCECA Championship "Best Server"
- 2006 FIVB World Grand Prix "Best Server"
- 2007 FIVB World Cup "Best Spiker"
- 2007 Pan-American Games "Most Valuable Player"
- 2007 NORCECA Championship "Most Valuable Player"
- 2007 NORCECA Championship "Best Spiker"
- 2007 NORCECA Championship "Best Blocker"
- 2007 Pan-American Cup "Most Valuable Player"
- 2007 Pan-American Cup "Best Attacker"
- 2007 Pan-American Cup "Best Server"
- 2007 Montreux Volley Masters "Most Valuable Player"
- 2008 Montreux Volley Masters "Best Blocker"
- 2009 NORCECA Championship "Best Blocker"

== Notes ==
Awards
Preceded by (Italy) Manuela Leggeri	Best Blocker of FIVB World Grand Prix; 2005	Succeeded by (Italy) Sara Anzanello
Preceded by (China) Yang Hao	Best Server of FIVB World Grand Prix; 2006	Succeeded by (China) Yang Hao
