= Melissa Raymond =

Canadian volleyball player (born 1980)

Personal information
- Nationality: Canadian
- Born: 27 August 1980 (age 46)
- Height: 1.87 m (6 ft 2 in)

Volleyball information
- Position: middle blocker
- Current club: Université de Sherbrooke
- Number: 14 (national team)

National team
2002	Canada

Melissa Raymond (born 27 August 1980) is a Canadian retired female volleyball player, who played as a middle blocker.

She was part of the Canada women's national volleyball team at the 2002 FIVB Volleyball Women's World Championship in Germany. On club level, she played with Université de Sherbrooke.

== Clubs ==
- Université de Sherbrooke (2002)
