= Annie Levesque =

Canadian volleyball player (born 1979)

Personal information
- Nationality: Canadian
- Born: 9 September 1979 (age 47)
- Height: 1.64 m (5 ft 5 in)

Volleyball information
- Position: libero
- Current club: Université de Sherbrooke
- Number: 15 (national team)

National team
2002-2008	Canada

Annie Levesque (born 9 September 1979) is a Canadian retired female volleyball player, who played as a libero. She was part of the Canada women's national volleyball team.

She participated at the 2002 FIVB Volleyball Women's World Championship in Germany. On club level she played with Université de Sherbrooke.

== Clubs ==
- Université de Sherbrooke (2002)
