= 2009 Women's Pan-American Volleyball Cup squads =

This article shows all participating team squads at the 2009 Women's Pan-American Volleyball Cup, held from June 24 to July 5, 2009 in Miami, Florida.

== Argentina ==
- Head Coach: Horacio Bastit

#	Name	Date of birth	Height	Weight	Spike	Block
1	Tatiana Rizzo	30.12.1986
3	Yamila Nizetich
4	Leticia Boscacci	08.11.1985
5	Lucía Fresco
8	Georgina Klug (c)
9	Natali Flaviani	08.10.1985	183	72	286	280
10	Lucía Bertaina
11	Georgina Pinedo	30.05.1981	175	65	305	295
12	Marianela Robinet	24.11.1983	172	54	286	275
13	Sabrina Segui	12.05.1978	180	68	282	271
14	Camila Jersonsky
16	Florencia Busquets

== Brazil ==
- Head Coach: José Roberto Guimarães

#	Name	Date of birth	Height	Weight	Spike	Block
1	Fabiana Claudino	24.01.1985	193	76	314	293
2	Ana Takagui	26.10.1987	187	74	295	284
3	Marianne Steinbrecher	23.08.1983	188	70	310	290
5	Caroline Gattaz	27.07.1981	192	87	304	280
6	Thaisa Menezes	15.05.1987	196	79	316	301
8	Danielle Lins (c)	05.01.1985	181	68	290	276
10	Welissa Gonzaga	09.09.1982	179	76	300	287
11	Natalia Pereira	24.04.1989	183	76	300	288
13	Sheilla Castro	01.07.1983	185	64	302	284
14	Fabiana de Oliveira	07.03.1980	169	59	276	266
15	Adenizia da Silva	18.12.1986	185	63	312	290
16	Regiane Bidias	02.10.1986	189	74	304	286
18	Joyce Silva	13.06.1984	190	67	311	294
19	Camila Brait	28.10.1988	170	58	271	256

== Canada ==
- Head Coach: Arnd Ludwig

#	Name	Date of birth	Height	Weight	Spike	Block
1	Larissa Cundy
2	Julie Young
3	Janie Guimond
4	Tammy Mahon (c)
5	Tiffany Dodds
7	Tonya Mokelki
8	Sofie-Hanna Schlagintweit
11	Nadine Alphonse
12	Sherline Tasha Holness
14	Ashley Voth
15	Colette Meek
16	Jennifer Hinze
17	Brittney Page
19	Samantha Loewen

== Costa Rica ==
- Head Coach: Braulio Godínez

#	Name	Date of birth	Height	Weight	Spike	Block
1	Dionisia Thompson
2	Tatiana Murillo
5	Karen Cope
6	Angela Willis
7	Mariela Quesada
8	Susana Chávez González
9	Verania Willis (c)
10	Paola Ramírez
11	Onikca Pinnock
13	Melissa Fernández Monge
14	Irene Fonseca
16	Mijal Hines Cuza
17	Marianela Alfaro

== Dominican Republic ==
- Head Coach: Marcos Kwiek

#	Name	Date of birth	Height	Weight	Spike	Block
1	Annerys Vargas	07.08.1981	194	70	325	315
3	Lisvel Elisa Eve	10.09.1991	189	70	250	287
5	Brenda Castillo	05.06.1992	167	55	220	270
8	Niverka Marte	19.10.1990	178	71	233	283
9	Nuris Arias	20.05.1973	190	78	315	306
10	Milagros Cabral (c)	17.10.1978	181	63	308	305
11	Jeoselyna Rodríguez	09.12.1991	184	63	242	288
12	Karla Echenique	16.05.1986	181	62	279	273
14	Prisilla Rivera	29.12.1984	186	70	312	308
16	Marifranchi Rodríguez	29.08.1990	184	68	310	300
17	Altagracia Mambrú	21.01.1986	180	55	312	302
18	Bethania de la Cruz	13.05.1989	188	58	322	305

== Guatemala ==
- Head Coach: Julio Domínguez

#	Name	Date of birth	Height	Weight	Spike	Block
1	Íngrid López Guerra
2	Andrea Trampe Portillo
3	Blanca Recinos
6	Rut Beatriz Gomes
7	Diana Arias Azurdia
8	Walda Maldonado
11	Marie-Franz Burmester
12	Aneliesse Burmester (c)
15	María Estrada Santizo
16	Susana Alvarado
19	Silvia Herrera Juárez

== Mexico ==
- Head Coach: Samuel Cibrián

#	Name	Date of birth	Height	Weight	Spike	Block
2	Migdalel Ruiz (c)
3	Célida Córdova
4	Victoria Castilleja
5	Zaira Orellana
6	Lizeth López
8	Julieta López
10	Martha Revuelta	06.09.1986	176	77	295	287
11	Carolina Carranza
12	Evelyn Escobar
13	Olivia Meza
16	Gabriela Corona
17	Nancy Ortega

== Peru ==
- Head Coach: Cheol Yong Kim

#	Name	Date of birth	Height	Weight	Spike	Block
1	Angélica Aquino
2	Mirtha Uribe	12.03.1985	182	67	297	286
3	Paola García
4	Patricia Soto	10.02.1980	179	67	300	295
5	Vanessa Palacios	03.07.1984	167	66	255	250
6	Jessenia Uceda
7	Yulissa Zamudio	24.03.1976	184	61	320	300
10	Leyla Chihuán (c)
12	Carla Rueda
13	Zoila La Rosa
14	Elena Keldibekova
15	Karla Ortiz
16	Linda Paredes

== Puerto Rico ==
- Head Coach: Carlos Cardona

#	Name	Date of birth	Height	Weight	Spike	Block
1	Deborah Seilhamer	10.04.1985	182	68	280	272
3	Vilmarie Mojica (c)	13.08.1985	177	63	295	274
4	Tatiana Encarnación	28.07.1985	182	66	301	288
5	Sarai Álvarez	03.04.1986	189	61	295	286
6	Yarimar Rosa
9	Áurea Cruz	10.01.1982	182	63	310	290
10	Roselly Pérez
11	Karina Ocasio	08.01.1985	192	76	298	288
12	Ania Ruiz	07.11.1982	182	68	305	284
13	Yamileska Yantín
15	Jessica Candelario
16	Alexandra Oquendo	03.02.1984	189	64	298	297
17	Sheila Ocasio	17.11.1982	192	74	310	292

== Trinidad and Tobago ==
- Head Coach: Francisco Cruz Jiménez

#	Name	Date of birth	Height	Weight	Spike	Block
2	Jalicia Ross
3	Channon Thompson	29.03.1984	180	72	315	303
4	Kelly-Anne Billingy (c)	15.05.1986	187	87	316	303
6	Sinead Jack	08.11.1993	188	65	314	294
7	Marisha Herbert
8	Darlene Ramdin
10	Courtnee-Mae Clifford	06.07.1990	165	60	280	273
12	Renele Forde
13	Carleen Williams
14	Delana Mitchell
16	Krystle Esdelle	01.08.1984	187	67	291	282
17	Abigail Gloud	15.07.1987	182	65	285	282

== United States ==
- Head Coach: Hugh McCutcheon

#	Name	Date of birth	Height	Weight	Spike	Block
2	Danielle Scott-Arruda	01.10.1972	188	84	325	302
3	Tayyiba Haneef-Park	23.03.1979	201	80	318	299
4	Angela Pressey	06.06.1986	173	74	289	266
5	Stacy Sykora	24.06.1977	176	61	305	295
6	Nicole Davis	24.04.1982	167	73	284	266
7	Heather Bown	29.11.1978	188	90	301	290
8	Cynthia Barboza	07.02.1987	183	73	310	285
10	Kristin Richards	30.06.1985	182	61	300	284
11	Jordan Larson	16.10.1986	188	75	302	295
12	Nancy Metcalf	12.11.1978	186	73	314	292
15	Courtney Thompson	04.11.1984	170	66	276	263
16	Christa Harmotto	12.10.1986	188	79	322	300
17	Mary Spicer	03.07.1987	175	65	292	280
19	Jane Collymore	30.09.1984	182	68	310	305
