= 2011 Women's NORCECA Volleyball Championship squads =

This article shows all participating team squads at the 2011 Women's NORCECA Volleyball Championship, held from September 12 to September 17, 2011 in Caguas, Puerto Rico.

== Canada ==
- Head Coach: Arnd Ludwig

#	Name	Date of Birth	Height	Weight	Spike	Block
2	Julie Young	07.03.1986	188	72	287	273
4	Tammy Mahon (c)	04.11.1980	180	76	298	282
6	Claire Hanna	27.04.1986	182	67	291	279
8	Carla Bradstock	11.08.1985	178	68	282	271
9	Sarah Pavan	16.08.1986	196	73	314	302
10	Marisa Field	10.07.1987	189	71	309	291
12	Sherline Tasha Holness	11.02.1980	188	87	315	295
14	Elizabeth Cordonier	03.03.1987	183	75	304	285
16	Jennifer Hinze	20.05.1988	185	75	306	284
17	Brittney Page	04.02.1984	184	67	305	287
18	Kyla Richey	20.06.1989	188	79	302	287
19	Lauren O'Reilly	04.04.1989	178	69	293	273

== Costa Rica ==
- Head Coach: Braulio Godinez

#	Name	Date of Birth	Height	Weight	Spike	Block
2	Catalina Fernández Campos	12.12.1986	180	68	291	274
6	Angela Willis	26.01.1977	188	67	305	292
8	Susana Chávez González	24.11.1986	160	55	268	255
9	Verania Willis (c)	23.09.1979	182	73	303	285
10	Paola Ramírez	23.02.1987	186	85	294	285
11	Kiara Jiménez Corrales	23.03.1992	174	65	280	269
12	Daniela Vargas Quiroz	04.05.1996	184	62	254	246
14	Irene Fonseca	10.10.1985	182	70	285	272
15	Amelia Arias	17.12.1991	164	58	276	258
16	Mijal Hines Cuza	15.12.1993	186	80	290	280
17	Daniela Vargas Azofeita	13.11.1982	166	53	265	250
18	Maria Fernanda Conejo	24.08.1982	182	75	282	270

== Cuba ==
- Head Coach: Juan Carlos Gala

#	Name	Date of Birth	Height	Weight	Spike	Block
1	Wilma Salas	09.03.1991	188	60	313	298
2	Yanelis Santos	30.03.1986	179	71	315	312
3	Alena Rojas	09.08.1992	186	78	320	305
4	Yoana Palacios	06.10.1990	184	72	321	300
6	Daymara Lescay	05.09.1992	184	72	308	290
8	Emily Borrell	19.02.1992	167	55	270	260
10	Ana Cleger	27.11.1989	185	73	315	297
11	Leanny Castañeda	18.10.1986	188	70	325	320
13	Rosanna Giel	10.06.1992	187	62	320	315
14	Kenia Carcaces	22.01.1986	188	69	308	306
15	Yusidey Silié (c)	11.11.1984	183	80	316	300
17	Gyselle Silva	29.10.1991	184	70	302	295

== Dominican Republic ==
- Head Coach: Marcos Kwiek

#	Name	Date of Birth	Height	Weight	Spike	Block
1	Annerys Vargas	07.08.1981	194	70	325	315
2	Dahiana Burgos	07.04.1985	180	70	305	312
5	Brenda Castillo	05.06.1992	167	55	220	270
7	Niverka Marte	19.10.1990	178	71	233	283
8	Cándida Arias	11.03.1992	191	68	295	301
9	Sidarka Núñez	25.06.1984	188	62	330	315
10	Milagros Cabral (c)	17.10.1978	181	63	308	305
12	Karla Echenique	16.05.1986	181	62	279	273
13	Cindy Rondón	12.11.1988	183	61	312	305
14	Prisilla Rivera	29.12.1984	186	70	312	308
18	Bethania de la Cruz	13.05.1989	188	58	322	305
19	Ana Yorkira Binet	09.02.1992	174	62	267	288

== Mexico ==
- Head Coach: Mario Herrera

#	Name	Date of Birth	Height	Weight	Spike	Block
1	Nancy Ortega	31.03.1990	170	68	285	273
4	Gema León	11.03.1991	181	63	290	278
5	Andrea Rangel	19.05.1993	178	57	292	283
6	Karla Sainz	22.07.1993	184	75	298	285
7	Laura Daniela Lloreda	30.04.1981	173	80	295	289
8	Samantha Bricio	22.11.1994	185	58	296	283
13	Alejandra Isiordia	17.04.1994	184	72	283	274
14	Claudia Ríos (c)	22.09.1992	180	68	282	264
16	Dulce Carranza	29.06.1990	178	84	287	274
17	Zaira Orellana	03.05.1989	183	65	295	287
18	Andrea Aguilera	24.09.1993	184	74	299	284
19	Itzel Gaytan	21.10.1992	170	65	270	260

== Panama ==
- Head Coach: Reynaldo Ortega

#	Name	Date of Birth	Height	Weight	Spike	Block
1	Katherine Taju	18.09.1981	178	70	300	220
2	Jasmin Rojas	09.01.1982	175	66	200	180
3	Thais Mosquera	26.06.1984	162	112	170	165
4	Joanna Arroyo (c)	14.03.1979	170	73	280	200
5	Dionelis Delgado	07.04.1989	166	54	180	170
6	Maria Gallimore	20.02.1989	175	54	200	180
7	Ángela Evans	21.07.1994	183	68	300	220
8	Carina Corella	04.10.1982	178	65	220	185
9	Suany Terreros	09.10.1976	179	64	250	200
11	Katiuska Quintana	07.03.1983	180	79	200	180
13	Hashlyn Cuero	01.04.1990	180	68	250	200
16	Yokanny Comrie	31.10.1982	170	64	200	180

== Puerto Rico ==
- Head Coach: David Alemán

#	Name	Date of Birth	Height	Weight	Spike	Block
2	Pamela Cartagena	05.02.1987	188	55	299	292
3	Vilmarie Mojica (c)	13.08.1985	177	63	295	274
5	Sarai Álvarez	03.04.1986	189	61	295	286
6	Yarimar Rosa	20.06.1988	188	58	295	285
7	Stephanie Enright	15.12.1990	183	74	309	295
9	Áurea Cruz	10.01.1982	182	63	310	290
10	Diana Reyes	29.04.1993	191	80	303	299
12	Michelle Nogueras	05.12.1988	182	58	275	262
13	Shirley Ferrer	23.06.1991	183	63	290	293
15	Shara Venegas	18.09.1992	172	58	280	270
18	Linda Morales	20.05.1988	193	94	302	296
19	Amanda Vázquez	30.03.1984	194	94	302	297

== Trinidad and Tobago ==
- Head Coach: Francisco Cruz Jiménez

#	Name	Date of Birth	Height	Weight	Spike	Block
1	Andrea Kinsale	24.12.1989	188	65	315	297
3	Channon Thompson	29.03.1984	180	72	315	303
4	Kelly-Anne Billingy	15.05.1986	187	87	316	303
5	Shurvette Beckles	10.06.1990	184	65	303	294
6	Sinead Jack	08.11.1993	188	65	314	294
9	Rheeza Grant	10.08.1986	181	70	294	279
10	Courtnee-Mae Clifford	06.07.1990	165	60	280	273
14	Delana Mitchell	23.09.1987	185	63	304	289
15	Abby Blackman	27.06.1993	183	65	304	293
16	Krystle Esdelle (c)	01.08.1984	187	67	291	282
17	Abigail Gloud	15.07.1987	182	65	285	282
18	Rechez Lindsay	19.01.1994	164	57	260	240

== United States ==
- Head Coach: Hugh McCutcheon

#	Name	Date of Birth	Height	Weight	Spike	Block
4	Lindsey Berg	16.07.1980	173	81	285	270
6	Nicole Davis	24.04.1982	167	73	284	266
7	Heather Bown	29.11.1978	188	90	301	290
8	Alisha Glass	05.04.1988	184	72	305	300
9	Jennifer Tamas (c)	23.11.1982	191	82	315	301
10	Kimberly Glass	18.08.1984	190	75	314	299
11	Jordan Larson	16.10.1986	188	75	302	295
12	Nancy Metcalf	12.11.1978	186	73	314	292
15	Logan Tom	25.05.1981	186	80	306	297
16	Foluke Akinradewo	05.10.1987	191	79	331	300
18	Megan Hodge	15.10.1988	191	74	330	317
19	Destinee Hooker	07.09.1987	193	73	320	304
