= 2009 Women's NORCECA Volleyball Championship squads =

This article shows all participating team squads at the 2009 Women's NORCECA Volleyball Championship, held from September 22 to September 27, 2009 in Bayamón, Puerto Rico.

== Canada ==
- Head Coach: Arnd Ludwig

No.	Name	Date of birth	Club
1	Larissa Cundy		
2	Julie Young	7 March 1986	
3	Janie Guimond	11 April 1984	
4	Tammy Mahon	4 November 1980	Tomis Constanța
5	Tiffany Dodds	21 January 1986	Club Voleibol Haro
7	Tonya Mokelki	10 May 1985	SV Sinsheim
10	Marisa Field	10 July 1987	
11	Nadine Alphonse	22 July 1983	
12	Sherline Holness	11 February 1980	
13	Samantha Loewen	31 March 1989	University of Manitoba
15	Colette Meek	25 July 1986	USSP Albi
17	Brittney Page	4 February 1984	

== Costa Rica ==
- Head Coach: Braulio Godínez

No.	Name	Date of birth	Club
4	Johana Moore	10 March 1978	
5	Karen Cope	6 November 1985	San José
6	Angela Willis	26 January 1977	Limón
7	Mariela Quesada	8 July 1987	Santa Bárbara
8	Susana Chavez	24 November 1986	
9	Verania Willis	23 September 1979	Limón
10	Paola Ramírez	23 February 1987	UCR
12	Tracy Fernández		
13	Melissa Fernández		
14	Irene Fonseca	10 October 1985	Santa Bárbara
16	Mijal Hines	15 December 1993	Goicoechea
17	Marianela Alfaro	28 March 1985	Santa Bárbara

== Cuba ==
- Head Coach: Luis Oviedo

#	Name	Date of Birth	Height	Weight	Spike	Block
1	Wilma Salas	09.03.1991	188	60	313	298
2	Yanelis Santos	30.03.1986	183	71	315	312
3	Nancy Carrillo	11.01.1986	190	74	318	315
4	Yoana Palacios	06.10.1990	184	72	321	300
7	Lisbet Arredondo	22.11.1987	181	62	315	312
9	Rachel Sánchez	09.01.1989	188	75	325	320
10	Ana Cleger	27.11.1989	185	73	315	297
11	Leanny Castañeda	18.10.1986	188	70	325	320
14	Kenia Carcaces	22.01.1986	188	69	308	306
15	Yusidey Silié (c)	11.11.1984	183	80	316	300
17	Gyselle Silva	29.10.1991	184	70	302	295
19	Jennifer Álvarez

== Dominican Republic ==
- Head Coach: Marcos Kwiek

#	Name	Date of Birth	Height	Weight	Spike	Block
1	Annerys Vargas	07.08.1981	196	70	327	320
3	Lisvel Elisa Eve	10.09.1991	194	70	325	315
5	Brenda Castillo	05.06.1992	167	55	240	230
6	Ana Yorkira Binet	09.02.1992	174	62	280	288
7	Niverka Marte	19.10.1990	178	71	295	283
8	Cándida Arias	11.03.1992	194	68	320	315
10	Milagros Cabral (c)	17.10.1978	182	63	325	320
11	Jeoselyna Rodríguez	09.12.1991	187	63	325	315
12	Karla Echenique	16.05.1986	180	62	300	290
14	Prisilla Rivera	29.12.1984	183	70	309	305
17	Altagracia Mambrú	21.01.1986	182	55	330	315
18	Bethania de la Cruz	13.05.1989	188	58	330	320

== Mexico ==
- Head Coach: Samuel Cibrián

No.	Name	Date of birth	Club
1	Karla Sainz	22 July 1993	Baja Volleyball
3	Marlene Osorio		
6	Ana Rios		
7	Pamela Aguirre		
11	Grecia Rivera	8 June 1992	
12	Ruth Duran		
13	Olivia Meza	14 March 1991	Sinaloa
14	Cecilia Rios	22 September 1992	Tamaulipas
16	Violeta Rios		
17	Nancy Ortega	31 March 1990	Baja Volleyball

== Puerto Rico ==
- Head Coach: Carlos Cardona

#	Name	Date of Birth	Height	Weight	Spike	Block
2	Shara Venegas
3	Vilmarie Mojica (c)	13.08.1985	177	63	295	274
4	Tatiana Encarnación	28.07.1985	182	66	301	288
5	Sarai Álvarez	03.04.1986	189	61	295	286
7	Stephanie Enright	15.12.1990	183	74	309	295
8	Eva Cruz	22.01.1974	182	72	305	290
9	Áurea Cruz	10.01.1982	182	63	310	290
10	Raimariely Santos
12	Ania Ruiz	07.11.1982	182	68	305	284
16	Alexandra Oquendo	03.02.1984	189	64	298	297
17	Sheila Ocasio	17.11.1982	192	74	310	292
18	Wilnelia González

== Trinidad and Tobago ==
- Head Coach: Francisco Cruz Jimenez

No.	Name	Date of birth	Club
3	Channon Thompson	29 March 1984	UTT Volleyball
4	Kelly-Anne Billingy	15 May 1986	Glamorgan Volleyball
6	Shurvette Beckles	8 November 1993	
7	Marisha Herbert		
9	Arielle Herbert		
10	Courtneemae Clifford	6 July 1990	UTT Volleyball
14	Delana Mitchell	23 September 1987	UTT Volleyball
16	Krystle Esdelle	1 August 1984	UTT Volleyball
17	Abigail Gloud	15 July 1987	

== United States ==
- Head Coach: Hugh McCutcheon

#	Name	Date of Birth	Height	Weight	Spike	Block
1	Nicole Fawcett	16.12.1986	191	82	310	291
2	Danielle Scott-Arruda	01.10.1972	188	84	325	302
3	Angela Pressey	06.06.1986	173	74	289	266
4	Lindsey Berg	16.07.1980	173	81	285	270
5	Stacy Sykora	24.06.1977	176	61	305	295
6	Nicole Davis	24.04.1982	167	73	284	266
7	Heather Bown	29.11.1978	188	90	301	290
8	Cynthia Barboza	07.02.1987	183	73	310	285
11	Jordan Larson	16.10.1986	188	75	302	295
12	Nancy Metcalf (c)	12.11.1978	186	73	314	292
16	Christa Harmotto	12.10.1986	188	79	322	300
18	Courtney Thompson	04.11.1984	170	66	276	263
