= 2007 Women's NORCECA Volleyball Championship squads =

This article shows all participating team squads at the 2007 Women's NORCECA Volleyball Championship, held from September 16 to September 21, 2007 in the Investors Group Athletic Centre in Winnipeg, Canada.

== Canada ==
- Head Coach: Naoki Miyashita

No.	Name	Date of birth	Club
1	Dayna Jansen		
2	Tara Smart		
3	Larissa Cundy		
4	Tammy Mahon	4 November 1980	
5	Tiffany Dodds	21 January 1986	
8	Stephanie Penner		
9	Emily Cordonier		
10	Stacey Gordon	2 October 1982	
12	Tasha Holness		
14	Shelley Chalmers		
16	Annie Levesque	9 September 1979	

== Costa Rica ==
- Head Coach: Eladio Vargas

No.	Name	Date of birth	Club
1	Karen Cope	6 November 1985	
2	Catalina Fernández	12 December 1986	
7	Mariela Quesada	8 July 1987	
8	Olga Solano		
10	Paola Ramírez	23 February 1987	
11	Kimberly Palmer		
12	Angelica Jiménez	21 February 1990	
13	Irene Fonseca	10 October 1985	
15	Nathalia Alfaro	8 April 1987	
17	Marianela Alfaro	28 March 1985	

== Cuba ==
- Head Coach: Antonio Perdomo

#	Name	Date of Birth	Height	Weight	Spike	Block
1	Yumilka Ruiz (c)	08.05.1978	179	62	329	315
2	Yanelis Santos	30.03.1986	183	71	315	312
3	Nancy Carrillo	11.01.1986	190	74	318	315
4	Yenisey González	23.08.1983	193	67	315	312
6	Daimí Ramírez	08.10.1983	176	67	305	290
8	Yaima Ortiz	09.11.1981	179	70	325	313
10	Yusleinis Herrera	12.03.1984	180	67	312	310
12	Rosir Calderón	28.12.1984	191	66	330	325
14	Kenia Carcaces	22.01.1986	188	69	308	306
15	Yusidey Silié	11.11.1984	183	80	316	300
17	Gyselle Silva	29.10.1991	184	70	302	295
18	Zoila Barros	06.08.1976	188	76	325	312

== Dominican Republic ==
- Head Coach: Beato Miguel Cruz

#	Name	Date of Birth	Height	Weight	Spike	Block
3	Lisvel Elisa Eve	10.09.1991	189	70	250	287
4	Sidarka Núñez	25.06.1984	188	58	312	308
5	Brenda Castillo	05.06.1992	167	55	220	270
6	Carmen Rosa Caso	29.11.1981	168	59	243	241
8	Gina Del Rosario	12.05.1986	189	61	310	300
10	Milagros Cabral	17.10.1978	181	63	308	305
12	Iris Santos	29.01.1984	175	65
13	Cindy Rondón	12.11.1988	189	61	312	305
14	Jeoselyna Rodríguez Santos	09.12.1991	184	63	242	288
15	Cosiri Rodríguez (c)	30.08.1977	191	72	313	305
18	Bethania de la Cruz	13.05.1989	188	58	322	305

== Mexico ==
- Head Coach: Macario González

No.	Name	Date of birth	Club
1	Diana Rubio		
2	Migdalel Ruiz	3 March 1983	
3	Celida Cordova	1 August 1980	
7	Gema Leon		
8	Xitlali Herrera	2 January 1992	
9	Victoria Castilleja	16 May 1990	
10	Martha Revuelta	6 September 1986	
11	Carolina Carranza	29 June 1990	

== Puerto Rico ==
- Head Coach: Juan Carlos Núñez

#	Name	Date of Birth	Height	Weight	Spike	Block
1	Deborah Seilhamer	10.04.1985	182	68	280	272
3	Vilmarie Mojica	13.08.1985	177	63	295	274
4	Tatiana Encarnación	28.07.1985	182	72	300	279
6	Michelle Cardona	05.09.1981	172	50	290	259
8	Eva Cruz	22.01.1974	182	72	305	290
9	Áurea Cruz (c)	10.01.1982	182	63	310	290
13	Dariam Acevedo
16	Alexandra Oquendo
17	Sheila Ocasio	17.11.1982	192	74	310	292
18	Ana Rosa Luna
19	Wilnelia González

== Trinidad and Tobago ==
- Head Coach: Francisco Cruz Jiménez

No.	Name	Date of birth	Club
2	Shari Beharry		
3	Kervelle Redhead		
6	Sinead Jack	8 November 1993	
7	Karen Moses		
8	Darlene Ramdin	5 August 1989	
9	Rheeza Grant	10 August 1986	
10	Courtnee Mae Clifford	6 July 1990	
11	Malika Charles		
12	Renele Forde	6 August 1990	
13	Carleen Williams	6 July 1982	
15	Taila de Souza		
16	Krystle Esdelle	1 August 1984	

== United States ==
- Head Coach: Lang Ping

#	Name	Date of Birth	Height	Weight	Spike	Block
1	Ogonna Nnamani	29.07.1983	185	80	315	305
2	Danielle Scott	01.10.1972	188	84	325	302
3	Tayyiba Haneef	23.03.1979	201	80	318	299
4	Lindsey Berg	16.07.1980	173	81	285	270
5	Sarah Drury
7	Heather Bown	29.11.1978	188	90	301	290
8	Katherine Wilkins	10.05.1982	193	81	309	299
9	Jennifer Joines	23.11.1982	191	82	315	301
11	Robyn Ah Mow (c)	15.09.1975	172	68	291	281
13	Kathleen Olsovsky	03.01.1982	188	75	309	295
15	Nicole Davis	24.04.1982	167	73	284	266
18	Cassandra Busse
