= 2026 Women's Pan-American Volleyball Cup =

Tournament details
- Host country: Mexico
- Dates: 9–19 September 2026
- Teams: 10
- Venue: (in León host cities)

Final positions
- Champions: United States (8th title)
- Runners-up: Dominican Republic
- Third place: Mexico

Tournament awards
- MVP: Jess Mruzik (USA)

The 2026 Women's Pan-American Volleyball Cup, officially named 2026 NORCECA XXIII Panamerican Women Cup, was the 23rd edition of the Women's Pan-American Volleyball Cup, the annual volleyball tournament organized by the Pan-American Volleyball Union (UPV) that brings together the NORCECA and Confederación Sudamericana de Voleibol (CSV) women's national teams. It was held in Mexico from 9 to 19 September 2026.

The United States won their eighth title and the top of the podium since 2019, after defeated Dominican Republic 3–0 in final. Jess Mruzik of the United States won the Most Valuable Player award.

== Preliminary round ==
=== Group A ===
| Pos | Team | Pld | W | L | Pts | SW | SL | SR | SPW | SPL | SPR | Qualification |
|---|---|---|---|---|---|---|---|---|---|---|---|---|
| 1 | Puerto Rico | 4 | 4 | 0 | 18 | 12 | 2 | 6.000 | 342 | 240 | 1.425 | Semifinals |
| 2 | Dominican Republic | 4 | 3 | 1 | 15 | 10 | 4 | 2.500 | 332 | 255 | 1.302 | Quarterfinals |
| 3 | Canada | 4 | 2 | 2 | 12 | 8 | 6 | 1.333 | 307 | 284 | 1.081 | Quarterfinals |
| 4 | Nicaragua | 4 | 1 | 3 | 3 | 3 | 11 | 0.273 | 216 | 334 | 0.647 | |
| 5 | Venezuela | 4 | 0 | 4 | 2 | 2 | 12 | 0.167 | 249 | 333 | 0.748 | |

Source: NORCECA

| Date | Time | | Score | | Set 1 | Set 2 | Set 3 | Set 4 | Set 5 | Total | Report |
|---|---|---|---|---|---|---|---|---|---|---|---|
| 11 Sep | 14:00 | Puerto Rico | 3–0 | Venezuela | 25–19 | 25–13 | 25–11 | | | 75–43 | |
| 11 Sep | 16:00 | Dominican Republic | 3–0 | Nicaragua | 25–9 | 25–13 | 25–9 | | | 75–31 | |
| 12 Sep | 14:00 | Dominican Republic | 3–0 | Venezuela | 25–18 | 25–20 | 25–9 | | | 75–47 | |
| 12 Sep | 16:00 | Canada | 1–3 | Puerto Rico | 25–19 | 23–25 | 18–25 | 12–25 | | 78–94 | |
| 13 Sep | 14:00 | Venezuela | 2–3 | Nicaragua | 25–22 | 24–26 | 25–19 | 24–26 | 11–15 | 109–108 | |
| 13 Sep | 18:00 | Dominican Republic | 3–1 | Canada | 25–12 | 23–25 | 27–25 | 25–17 | | 100–79 | |
| 14 Sep | 14:00 | Puerto Rico | 3–0 | Nicaragua | 25–17 | 25–11 | 25–9 | | | 75–37 | |
| 14 Sep | 18:00 | Canada | 3–0 | Venezuela | 25–14 | 25–21 | 25–15 | | | 75–50 | |
| 15 Sep | 18:00 | Canada | 3–0 | Nicaragua | 25–13 | 25–9 | 25–18 | | | 75–40 | |
| 15 Sep | 20:00 | Dominican Republic | 1–3 | Puerto Rico | 22–25 | 25–23 | 16–25 | 19–25 | | 82–98 | |

=== Group B ===
| Pos | Team | Pld | W | L | Pts | SW | SL | SR | SPW | SPL | SPR | Qualification |
|---|---|---|---|---|---|---|---|---|---|---|---|---|
| 1 | Mexico | 4 | 4 | 0 | 19 | 12 | 1 | 12.000 | 320 | 212 | 1.509 | Semifinals |
| 2 | United States | 4 | 3 | 1 | 16 | 10 | 3 | 3.333 | 312 | 210 | 1.486 | Quarterfinals |
| 3 | Cuba | 4 | 2 | 2 | 10 | 6 | 6 | 1.000 | 255 | 238 | 1.071 | Quarterfinals |
| 4 | Guatemala | 4 | 1 | 3 | 3 | 3 | 11 | 0.273 | 212 | 330 | 0.642 | |
| 5 | Costa Rica | 4 | 0 | 4 | 2 | 2 | 12 | 0.167 | 217 | 326 | 0.666 | |

Source: NORCECA

| Date | Time | | Score | | Set 1 | Set 2 | Set 3 | Set 4 | Set 5 | Total | Report |
|---|---|---|---|---|---|---|---|---|---|---|---|
| 11 Sep | 18:00 | United States | 3–0 | Cuba | 25–16 | 25–15 | 25–20 | | | 75–51 | |
| 11 Sep | 20:00 | Mexico | 3–0 | Costa Rica | 25–8 | 25–13 | 25–11 | | | 75–32 | |
| 12 Sep | 18:00 | Cuba | 3–0 | Guatemala | 25–11 | 25–14 | 25–16 | | | 75–41 | |
| 12 Sep | 20:00 | United States | 1–3 | Mexico | 21–25 | 21–25 | 25–20 | 20–25 | | 87–95 | |
| 13 Sep | 16:00 | United States | 3–0 | Costa Rica | 25–9 | 25–8 | 25–16 | | | 75–33 | |
| 13 Sep | 20:00 | Mexico | 3–0 | Guatemala | 25–11 | 25–15 | 25–13 | | | 75–39 | |
| 14 Sep | 16:00 | Costa Rica | 2–3 | Guatemala | 21–25 | 25–13 | 25–23 | 21–25 | 13–15 | 105–101 | |
| 14 Sep | 20:00 | Mexico | 3–0 | Cuba | 25–19 | 25–20 | 25–15 | | | 75–54 | |
| 15 Sep | 14:00 | United States | 3–0 | Guatemala | 25–9 | 25–8 | 25–14 | | | 75–31 | |
| 15 Sep | 16:00 | Cuba | 3–0 | Costa Rica | 25–16 | 25–16 | 25–15 | | | 75–47 | |

== Bracket ==
Quarterfinals
B2 | United States | 3
A3 | Canada | 0
A2 | Dominican Republic | 3
B3 | Cuba | 0

Semifinals
B2 | United States | 3
A1 | Puerto Rico | 1
A2 | Dominican Republic | 3
B1 | Mexico | 2

Final
B2 | United States | 3
A2 | Dominican Republic | 0
Third place
A1 | Puerto Rico | 1
B1 | Mexico | 3

== Classification 7th–10th ==
| Date | Time | | Score | | Set 1 | Set 2 | Set 3 | Set 4 | Set 5 | Total | Report |
|---|---|---|---|---|---|---|---|---|---|---|---|
| 16 Sep | 14:00 | Nicaragua | 0–3 | Costa Rica | 21–25 | 15–25 | 15–25 | | | 51–75 | |
| 16 Sep | 16:00 | Guatemala | 0–3 | Venezuela | 12–25 | 16–25 | 19–25 | | | 47–75 | |

== Quarterfinals ==
| Date | Time | | Score | | Set 1 | Set 2 | Set 3 | Set 4 | Set 5 | Total | Report |
|---|---|---|---|---|---|---|---|---|---|---|---|
| 16 Sep | 18:00 | Dominican Republic | 3–1 | Cuba | 18–25 | 25–23 | 25–15 | 25–21 | | 93–84 | |
| 16 Sep | 20:00 | United States | 3–0 | Canada | 25–15 | 25–19 | 25–12 | | | 75–46 | |

== Ninth place match ==
| Date | Time | | Score | | Set 1 | Set 2 | Set 3 | Set 4 | Set 5 | Total | Report |
|---|---|---|---|---|---|---|---|---|---|---|---|
| 17 Sep | 14:00 | Nicaragua | 3–0 | Guatemala | 25–18 | 25–20 | 25–17 | | | 75–55 | |

== Seventh place match ==
| Date | Time | | Score | | Set 1 | Set 2 | Set 3 | Set 4 | Set 5 | Total | Report |
|---|---|---|---|---|---|---|---|---|---|---|---|
| 17 Sep | 16:00 | Costa Rica | 2–3 | Venezuela | 22–25 | 23–25 | 25–20 | 25–20 | 12–15 | 107–105 | |

== Semifinals ==
| Date | Time | | Score | | Set 1 | Set 2 | Set 3 | Set 4 | Set 5 | Total | Report |
|---|---|---|---|---|---|---|---|---|---|---|---|
| 17 Sep | 20:00 | Mexico | 2–3 | Dominican Republic | 25–19 | 21–25 | 21–25 | 25–20 | 12–15 | 104–104 | |
| 17 Sep | 18:00 | Puerto Rico | 1–3 | United States | 18–25 | 25–23 | 26–28 | 24–26 | | 93–102 | |

== Third place match ==
| Date | Time | | Score | | Set 1 | Set 2 | Set 3 | Set 4 | Set 5 | Total | Report |
|---|---|---|---|---|---|---|---|---|---|---|---|
| 18 Sep | 18:00 | Puerto Rico | 1–3 | Mexico | 25–20 | 20–25 | 23–25 | 26–28 | | 94–98 | |

== Final ==
| Date | Time | | Score | | Set 1 | Set 2 | Set 3 | Set 4 | Set 5 | Total | Report |
|---|---|---|---|---|---|---|---|---|---|---|---|
| 18 Sep | 20:00 | United States | 3–0 | Dominican Republic | 28–26 | 25–19 | 25–18 | | | 78–63 | |

== Final standing ==
| Rank | Team |
|---|---|
| 1st place, gold medalist(s) | United States |
| 2nd place, silver medalist(s) | Dominican Republic |
| 3rd place, bronze medalist(s) | Mexico |
| 4 | Puerto Rico |
| 5 | Canada |
| 6 | Cuba |
| 7 | Venezuela |
| 8 | Costa Rica |
| 9 | Nicaragua |
| 10 | Guatemala |

== Individual awards ==
- Most valuable player
  - Jess Mruzik (USA)
- Best scorer
  - Flormarie Heredia (DOM)
- Best setter
  - Rachel Fairbanks (USA)
- Best Opposite
  - Sofía Maldonado (MEX)
- Best spikers
  - Flormarie Heredia (DOM)
  - Aimé Topete (MEX)
- Best blockers
  - Geraldine González (DOM)
  - Emma Boyd (CAN)
- Best libero
  - Yaneirys Rodríguez (DOM)
- Best server
  - Ivania Ortiz (PUR)
- Best receiver
  - Valeria Vázquez (PUR)
- Best digger
  - Yaneirys Rodríguez (DOM)
