= United States women's national volleyball team =

United States
- Association: USA Volleyball
- Confederation: NORCECA
- Head coach: Erik Sullivan
- FIVB ranking: 7 (24 May 2026)

Uniforms
Home	Away

Summer Olympics
- Appearances: 13 (First in 1964)
- Best result: (2020)

World Championship
- Appearances: 18 (First in 1956)
- Best result: (2014)

World Cup
- Appearances: 11 (First in 1973)
- Best result: (2011, 2019)
- www.usavolleyball.org
Honours
Olympic Games
Gold medal – first place	2020 Tokyo	Team
Silver medal – second place	1984 Los Angeles	Team
Silver medal – second place	2008 Beijing	Team
Silver medal – second place	2012 London	Team
Silver medal – second place	2024 Paris	Team
Bronze medal – third place	1992 Barcelona	Team
Bronze medal – third place	2016 Rio de Janeiro	Team
FIVB World Championship
Gold medal – first place	2014 Italy
Silver medal – second place	1967 Japan
Silver medal – second place	2002 Germany
Bronze medal – third place	1982 Peru
Bronze medal – third place	1990 China
FIVB World Cup
Silver medal – second place	2011 Japan
Silver medal – second place	2019 Japan
Bronze medal – third place	2003 Japan
Bronze medal – third place	2007 Japan
Bronze medal – third place	2015 Japan
World Grand Champions
Silver medal – second place	2005 Japan
Silver medal – second place	2013 Japan
Bronze medal – third place	2017 Japan
FIVB Nations League
Gold medal – first place	2018 Nanjing
Gold medal – first place	2019 Nanjing
Gold medal – first place	2021 Rimini
FIVB World Grand Prix
Gold medal – first place	1995 Shanghai
Gold medal – first place	2001 Macau
Gold medal – first place	2010 Ningbo
Gold medal – first place	2011 Macau
Gold medal – first place	2012 Ningbo
Gold medal – first place	2015 Omaha
Silver medal – second place	2016 Bangkok
Bronze medal – third place	2003 Andria
Bronze medal – third place	2004 Reggio Calabria
Pan American Games
Gold medal – first place	1967 Winnipeg	Team
Gold medal – first place	2015 Toronto	Team
Silver medal – second place	1955 Mexico City	Team
Silver medal – second place	1959 Chicago	Team
Silver medal – second place	1963 São Paulo	Team
Silver medal – second place	1983 Caracas	Team
Silver medal – second place	1995 Mar del Plata	Team
Bronze medal – third place	1987 Indianapolis	Team
Bronze medal – third place	1999 Winnipeg	Team
Bronze medal – third place	2003 Santo Domingo	Team
Bronze medal – third place	2007 Rio de Janeiro	Team
Bronze medal – third place	2011 Guadalajara	Team
Pan-American Cup
Gold medal – first place	2003 Saltillo
Gold medal – first place	2012 Mexico
Gold medal – first place	2013 Peru
Gold medal – first place	2015 Lima/Callao
Gold medal – first place	2017 Lima/Cañete
Gold medal – first place	2018 Santo Domingo
Gold medal – first place	2019 Trujillo/Chiclayo
Gold medal – first place	2026 León
Silver medal – second place	2004 Tijuana/Mexicali
Silver medal – second place	2014 Mexico City
Silver medal – second place	2024 León and Irapuato
Bronze medal – third place	2010 Rosarito/Tijuana
Bronze medal – third place	2011 Chihuahua/Mexicali
Bronze medal – third place	2016 Santo Domingo
Bronze medal – third place	2021 Santo Domingo
Bronze medal – third place	2022 Hermosillo
Bronze medal – third place	2023 Ponce
NORCECA Championship
Gold medal – first place	1981 Mexico City
Gold medal – first place	1983 Indianapolis
Gold medal – first place	2001 Santo Domingo
Gold medal – first place	2003 Santo Domingo
Gold medal – first place	2005 Port of Spain
Gold medal – first place	2011 Caguas
Gold medal – first place	2013 Omaha
Gold medal – first place	2015 Morelia
Silver medal – second place	1975 Los Angeles
Silver medal – second place	1977 Santo Domingo
Silver medal – second place	1979 Havana
Silver medal – second place	1985 Santiago de los Caballeros
Silver medal – second place	1987 Havana
Silver medal – second place	1991 Regina
Silver medal – second place	1993 Colorado
Silver medal – second place	1995 Santo Domingo
Silver medal – second place	1997 Caguas
Silver medal – second place	1999 Monterrey
Silver medal – second place	2007 Winnipeg
Silver medal – second place	2019 San Juan
Silver medal – second place	2023 Quebec City
Silver medal – second place	2026 Santo Domingo
Bronze medal – third place	1969 Mexico City
Bronze medal – third place	1973 Tijuana
Bronze medal – third place	1989 San Juan
NORCECA Final Six
Gold medal – first place	2023 Santo Domingo
Gold medal – first place	2025 Guadalajara
Gold medal – first place	2026 Zinacantepec
Silver medal – second place	2022 Santo Domingo
Silver medal – second place	2024 Santo Domingo
Final Four Cup
Silver medal – second place	2009 Lima
Montreux Volley Masters
Silver medal – second place	1991 Switzerland
Silver medal – second place	2004 Switzerland
Silver medal – second place	2010 Switzerland
Silver medal – second place	2014 Switzerland
Bronze medal – third place	1995 Switzerland
Bronze medal – third place	1996 Switzerland
Goodwill Games
Silver medal – second place	1994 Saint Petersburg

The United States women's national volleyball team participates in international volleyball competitions and friendly games, and is governed by USA Volleyball. Their last head coach was three-time Olympic gold medalist and retired dominant beach volleyball player Karch Kiraly.

Before 2014, the United States women's national volleyball team had achieved second place six times in major competitions (1967 World Women's Volleyball Championship, 1984 Los Angeles Olympic Games, 2002 World Women's Volleyball Championship, 2008 Beijing Olympic Games, 2011 World Cup, 2012 London Olympic Games) but had never reached the top. In 2014, the team had a breakthrough to capture its first major title by defeating China in the Women's Volleyball World Championship final. The team captured its first Olympic gold medal at the 2020 Tokyo Olympics.

== Tournament record ==
=== Summer Olympics ===
Champions Runners up Third place Fourth place

Summer Olympics record
Year	Round	Position	Pld	W	L	SW	SL	Squad
(Japan) 1964	Group stage	5th Place	5	1	4	3	12	Squad
(Mexico) 1968	Group stage	8th Place	7	0	7	4	21	Squad
(West Germany) 1972	did not participate							
(Canada) 1976	did not participate							
(Soviet Union) 1980	withdrew							
(United States) 1984	Final	Silver	5	4	1	12	6	Squad
(South Korea) 1988	5th–8th places	7th Place	5	2	3	9	13	Squad
(Spain) 1992	Semifinals	Bronze	6	4	2	16	9	Squad
(United States) 1996	5th–8th places	7th Place	8	5	3	16	12	Squad
(Australia) 2000	Semifinals	Fourth place	8	5	3	18	12	Squad
(Greece) 2004	Quarterfinals	5th Place	6	2	4	13	13	Squad
(China) 2008	Final	Silver	8	6	2	19	14	Squad
(United Kingdom) 2012	Final	Silver	8	7	1	22	5	Squad
(Brazil) 2016	Semifinals	Bronze	8	7	1	23	9	Squad
(Japan) 2020	Final	Gold	8	7	1	21	7	Squad
(France) 2024	Final	Silver	6	4	2	14	10	Squad
(United States) 2028	Qualified (Hosts)							
(Australia) 2032	TBD							
Total	1 Title	13/18	88	54	34	190	133	—

=== World Championship ===
Champions Runners up Third place Fourth place

World Championship record
Year	Round	Position	Pld	W	L	SW	SL	Squad
(Soviet Union) 1952	Didn't Participate							
(France) 1956	Final round	9th Place	11	4	7	17	23	Squad
(Brazil) 1960	Final round	6th Place	6	1	5	4	15	Squad
(Soviet Union) 1962	Didn't Participate							
(Japan) 1967	Round Robin	Runners Up	3	2	1	6	5	Squad
(Bulgaria) 1970	9th–16th places	11th Place	9	5	4	20	17	Squad
(Mexico) 1974	7th–12th places	12th Place	11	2	9	7	29	Squad
(Soviet Union) 1978	5th–8th places	5th Place	9	7	2	23	6	Squad
(Peru) 1982	Semifinals	Third Place	9	7	2	23	7	Squad
(Czechoslovakia) 1986	9th–12th places	10th Place	8	3	5	13	18	Squad
(China) 1990	Semifinals	Third Place	7	5	2	15	8	Squad
(Brazil) 1994	5th–8th places	6th Place	7	4	3	14	11	Squad
(Japan) 1998	First round	13th Place	3	0	3	0	9	Squad
(Germany) 2002	Final	Runners Up	11	10	1	32	9	Squad
(Japan) 2006	9th–12th places	9th Place	11	7	4	24	19	Squad
(Japan) 2010	Semifinals	Fourth place	11	7	4	26	14	Squad
(Italy) 2014	Final	Champions	13	11	2	33	11	Squad
(Japan) 2018	Third round	5th Place	12	8	4	29	18	Squad
(Netherlands) (Poland) 2022	Semifinals	Fourth place	12	8	4	25	17	Squad
(Thailand) 2025	Quarterfinals	5th place	5	4	1	13	5	Squad
(Canada) (United States) 2027	Qualified (Hosts)							
(Philippines) 2029	To be determined							
Total	1 Title	19/22	158	95	63	324	241	—

=== World Cup ===
Champions Runners up Third place Fourth place

World Cup record
Year	Round	Position	Pld	W	L	SW	SL	Squad
(Uruguay) 1973	First round	6th Place	6	2	4	7	13	Squad
(Japan) 1977	First round	7th Place	6	2	4	10	15	Squad
(Japan) 1981	Round Robin	Fourth place	7	5	2	17	9	Squad
(Japan) 1985	Didn't Qualify							
(Japan) 1989	Didn't Qualify							
(Japan) 1991	Final round	Fourth place	8	5	3	19	13	Squad
(Japan) 1995	Round Robin	7th Place	11	6	5	19	18	Squad
(Japan) 1999	Round Robin	9th Place	11	3	8	17	26	Squad
(Japan) 2003	Round Robin	Third place	11	8	3	28	13	Squad
(Japan) 2007	Round Robin	Third place	11	9	2	28	13	Squad
(Japan) 2011	Round Robin	Runners up	11	9	2	27	10	Squad
(Japan) 2015	Round Robin	Third place	11	9	2	29	7	Squad
(Japan) 2019	Round Robin	Runners up	11	10	1	30	10	Squad
Total	0 Titles	11/13	104	68	36	231	147	—

=== World Grand Champions Cup ===
Champions Runners up Third place Fourth place

World Grand Champions record
Year	Round	Position	Pld	W	L	SW	SL	Squad
(Japan) 1993	Round Robin	5th place	5	1	4	8	14	Squad
(Japan) 1997	Did not qualify							
(Japan) 2001	Round Robin	5th Place	5	1	4	8	13	Squad
(Japan) 2005	Round Robin	Runners Up	5	4	1	12	4	Squad
(Japan) 2009	Did not qualify							
(Japan) 2013	Round Robin	Runners Up	5	4	1	12	9	Squad
(Japan) 2017	Round Robin	Third place	5	3	2	10	10	Squad
Total	0 Titles	5/7	25	13	12	50	50	—

=== Nations League ===
Champions Runners up Third place Fourth place

Nations League record
Year	Round	Position	Pld	W	L	SW	SL	Squad
(China) 2018	Final	Champions	19	17	2	54	13	Squad
(China) 2019	Final	Champions	19	16	3	51	22	Squad
(Italy) 2021	Final	Champions	17	16	1	48	8	Squad
(Turkey) 2022	Quarterfinals	5th place	13	11	2	35	10	Squad
(United States) 2023	Semifinals	Fourth place	15	11	4	40	23	Squad
(Thailand) 2024	Quarterfinals	7th place	13	7	6	27	20	Squad
(Poland) 2025	Quarterfinals	8th place	13	7	6	26	26	Squad
(Macau) 2026	Quarterfinals	5th place	13	10	3	34	14	Squad
Total	3 Titles	8/8	122	95	27	315	136	—

=== World Grand Prix ===
Champions Runners up Third place Fourth place

World Grand Prix record
Year	Round	Position	Pld	W	L	SW	SL	Squad
(Hong Kong) 1993	Preliminary round	7th Place	9	3	6	15	21	Squad
(China) 1994	Preliminary round	6th Place	9	7	2	24	12	Squad
(China) 1995	Final round Robin	Champions	15	14	1	44	21	Squad
(China) 1996	Preliminary round	5th Place	12	7	5	28	24	Squad
(Japan) 1997	Preliminary round	8th Place	9	0	9	5	27	Squad
(Hong Kong) 1998	Preliminary round	8th Place	9	0	9	4	27	Squad
(China) 1999	Didn't Participate							
(Philippines) 2000	Preliminary round	6th Place	11	5	6	18	22	Squad
(Macau) 2001	Final	Champions	14	10	4	33	22	Squad
(Hong Kong) 2002	Preliminary round	6th Place	9	3	6	16	20	Squad
(Italy) 2003	Final round Robin	Third Place	10	7	3	24	12	Squad
(Italy) 2004	Semifinals	Third Place	13	8	5	33	20	Squad
(Japan) 2005	Preliminary round	8th Place	9	4	5	16	19	Squad
(Italy) 2006	Preliminary round	7th Place	9	4	5	19	18	Squad
(China) 2007	Preliminary round	7th Place	9	5	4	18	18	Squad
(Japan) 2008	Final round Robin	Fourth place	14	9	5	31	24	Squad
(Japan) 2009	Preliminary round	9th Place	9	3	6	14	22	Squad
(China) 2010	Final round Robin	Champions	14	12	2	38	14	Squad
(Macau) 2011	Final	Champions	14	12	2	38	10	Squad
(China) 2012	Final round Robin	Champions	14	14	0	42	6	Squad
(Japan) 2013	Final round Robin	6th Place	14	9	5	31	23	Squad
(Japan) 2014	Intercontinental round	6th Place	9	5	4	20	18	Squad
(United States) 2015	Round Robin	Champions	14	13	1	41	11	Squad
(Thailand) 2016	Final	Runners-up	13	11	2	36	8	Squad
(China) 2017	Final round	5th Place	11	6	5	26	20	Squad
Total	6 Titles	24/25	273	171	102	614	439	—

=== Pan American Games ===
Champions Runners up Third place Fourth place

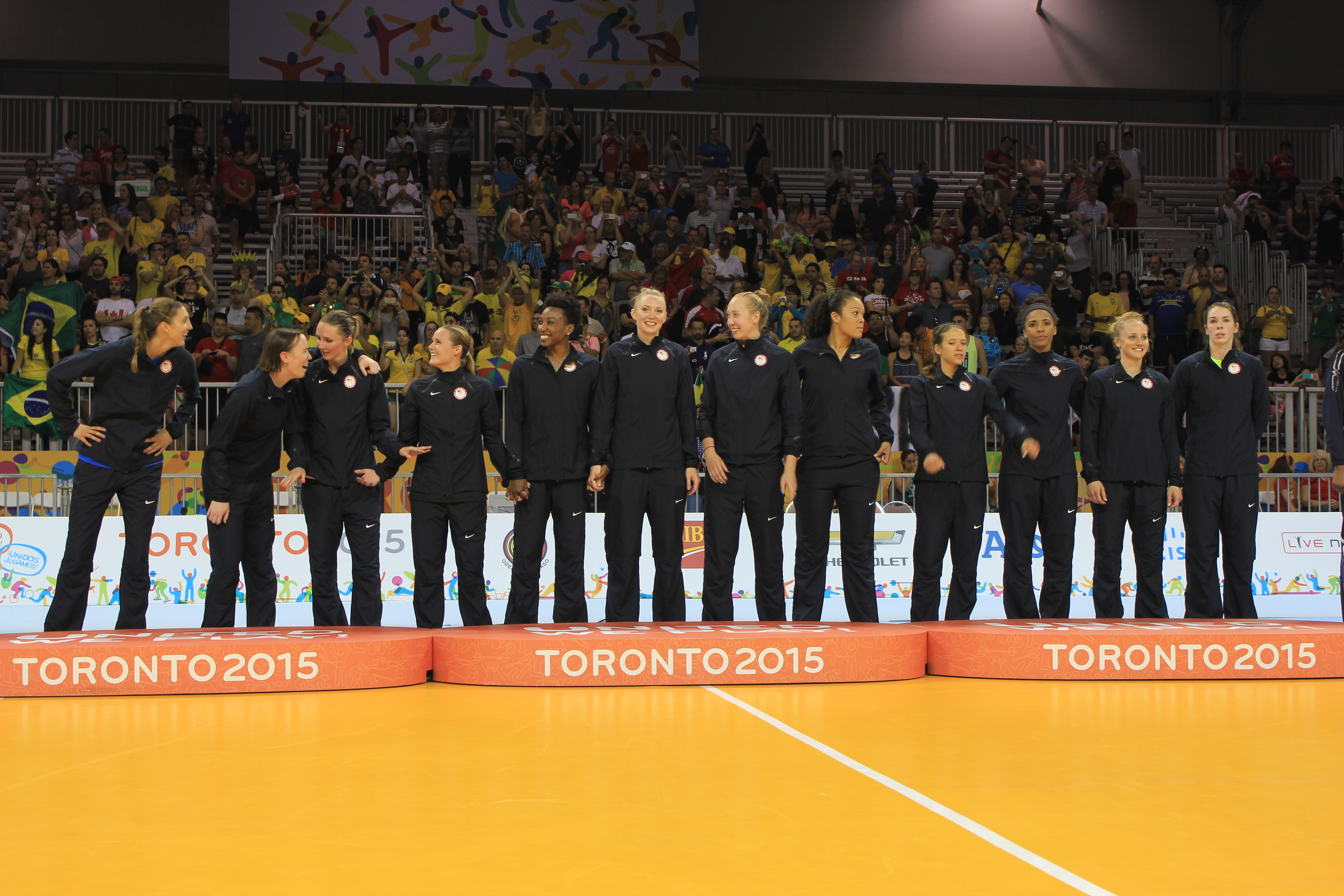
United States team in Toronto 2015.

Pan American Games record
Year	Round	Position	Pld	W	L	SW	SL	Squad
(Mexico) 1955		Runners Up						Squad
(United States) 1959		Runners Up						Squad
(Brazil) 1963		Runners Up						Squad
(Canada) 1967		Champions						Squad
(Colombia) 1971		6th Place						Squad
(Mexico) 1975		6th Place						Squad
(Puerto Rico) 1979		4th Place						Squad
(Venezuela) 1983		Runners Up						Squad
(United States) 1987		Third Place						Squad
(Cuba) 1991		5th Place						Squad
(Argentina) 1995		Runners Up						Squad
(Canada) 1999		Third Place						Squad
(Dominican Republic) 2003		Third Place						Squad
(Brazil) 2007		Third Place						Squad
(Mexico) 2011		Third Place						Squad
(Canada) 2015	Final Round	Champions	6	5	1	17	5	Squad
(Peru) 2019	Final Round	7th place	4	1	3	5	11	Squad
(Chile) 2023	Withdrew							
Total	2 Titles	17/18						—

=== Pan American Cup ===
Champions Runners-up Third place Fourth place

Pan-American Cup record
Year	Round	Position	Pld	W	L	SW	SL	Squad
(Mexico) 2002	Round robin	6th place						Squad
(Mexico) 2003	Final	Champions						Squad
(Mexico) 2004	Final	Runners-up						Squad
(Dominican Republic) 2005	Semi-finals	Fourth place						Squad
(Puerto Rico) 2006	Semi-finals	Fourth place						Squad
(Mexico) 2007	Semi-finals	Fourth place						Squad
(Mexico) 2008	Quarter-finals	5th place						Squad
(United States) 2009	Semi-finals	Fourth place						Squad
(Mexico) 2010	Semi-finals	Third place						Squad
(Mexico) 2011	Semi-finals	Third place						Squad
(Mexico) 2012	Final	Champions						Squad
(Peru) 2013	Final	Champions						Squad
(Mexico) 2014	Final	Runners-up						Squad
(Peru) 2015	Final	Champions						Squad
(Dominican Republic) 2016	Semi-finals	Third place						Squad
(Peru) 2017	Final	Champions						Squad
(Dominican Republic) 2018	Final	Champions						Squad
(Mexico) 2019	Final	Champions						Squad
(Dominican Republic) 2021	Semi-finals	Third place						Squad
(Mexico) 2022	Semi-finals	Third place						Squad
(Puerto Rico) 2023	Semi-finals	Third place						Squad
(Mexico) 2024	Final	Runners-up						Squad
(Mexico) 2025	Withdrew							
(Mexico) 2026	Final	Champions	7	6	1	19	4	Squad
Total	8 Titles	23/24						—

=== NORCECA Championship ===
Champions Runners up Third place Fourth place

NORCECA Championship record
Year	Round	Position	Pld	W	L	SW	SL	Squad
(Mexico) 1969	Semifinals	Third Place	5	3	2	9	7	Squad
(Cuba) 1971	Did not enter							
(Mexico) 1973	Semifinals	Third Place	4	2	2	9	8	Squad
(United States) 1975	Round Robin	Runners Up	4	3	1	9	5	Squad
(Dominican Republic) 1977	Final	Runners Up	7	5	2	16	6	Squad
(Cuba) 1979	Round Robin	Runners Up	6	5	1	16	5	Squad
(Mexico) 1981	Final	Champions	5	5	0	15	1	Squad
(United States) 1983	Round Robin	Champions	5	5	0	15	0	Squad
(Dominican Republic) 1985	Final	Runners Up	6	5	1	15	4	Squad
(Cuba) 1987	Round Robin	Runners Up	6	5	1	15	3	Squad
(Puerto Rico) 1989	Semifinals	Third Place	6	4	2	12	6	Squad
(Canada) 1991	Final	Runners Up	8	6	2	18	6	Squad
(United States) 1993	Final	Runners Up	4	3	1	10	3	Squad
(Dominican Republic) 1995	Final	Runners Up	6	5	1	16	5	Squad
(Puerto Rico) 1997	Final	Runners Up	6	4	2	13	7	Squad
(Mexico) 1999	Final	Runners Up	6	4	2	12	6	Squad
(Dominican Republic) 2001	Final	Champions	4	4	0	12	3	Squad
(Dominican Republic) 2003	Final	Champions	4	4	0	12	2	Squad
(Trinidad and Tobago) 2005	Final	Champions	5	4	1	12	6	Squad
(Canada) 2007	Final	Runners Up	5	4	1	14	3	Squad
(Puerto Rico) 2009	Semifinals	Fourth place	6	3	3	13	10	Squad
(Puerto Rico) 2011	Final	Champions	5	5	0	15	0	Squad
(United States) 2013	Final	Champions	4	4	0	12	1	Squad
(Mexico) 2015	Final	Champions	5	5	0	15	1	Squad
(Canada) / (Dominican Republic) / (Trinidad and Tobago) 2017	Did not qualify as Reigning World Champions							
(Puerto Rico) 2019	Final	Runners Up	5	4	1	14	3	Squad
(Mexico) 2021	Semifinals	Fourth place	5	2	3	10	11	Squad
(Canada) 2023	Final	Runners Up	5	4	1	14	3	Squad
(Dominican Republic) 2026	Final	Runners Up	6	4	2	16	6	Squad
Total	8 Titles	27/29	143	111	32	359	121	—

=== NORCECA Final Six ===
Champions Runners up Third place Fourth place

NORCECA Final Six record
Year	Round	Position	Pld	W	L	SW	SL	Squad
(Dominican Republic) 2022	Final	Runners Up						
(Dominican Republic) 2023	Final	Champions						
(Dominican Republic) 2024	Final	Runners Up						
(Mexico) 2025	Final	Champions						
(Mexico) 2026	Final	Champions	7	7	0	21	4	
Total	3 Titles	5/5						—

=== Final Four Cup ===
Champions Runners up Third place Fourth place

Final Four Cup record
Year	Round	Position	Pld	W	L	SW	SL	Squad
(Brazil) 2008	Didn't Compete							
(Peru) 2009	Final Round	Runners Up						Squad
(Mexico) 2010	Didn't Compete							
Total	0 Titles	1/3						—

=== Montreux Volley Masters ===
Champions Runners up Third place Fourth place

Montreux Masters record
Year	Round	Position	Pld	W	L	SW	SL	Squad
(Switzerland) 1990	Didn't Participate							
(Switzerland) 1991		Runners Up						Squad
(Switzerland) 1992		4th Place						Squad
(Switzerland) 1993		6th Place						Squad
(Switzerland) 1994		4th Place						Squad
(Switzerland) 1995		Third Place						Squad
(Switzerland) 1996		Third Place						Squad
(Switzerland) 1997	Competitions Cancelled							
(Switzerland) 1998		6th Place						Squad
(Switzerland) 1999		7th Place						Squad
(Switzerland) 2000		7th Place						Squad
(Switzerland) 2001		5th Place						Squad
(Switzerland) 2002		7th Place						Squad
(Switzerland) 2003		4th Place						Squad
(Switzerland) 2004		Runners Up						Squad
(Switzerland) 2005		7th Place						Squad
(Switzerland) 2006	Didn't Participate							
(Switzerland) 2007	Didn't Participate							
(Switzerland) 2008	Didn't Participate							
(Switzerland) 2009	Didn't Participate							
(Switzerland) 2010		Runners Up						Squad
(Switzerland) 2011		4th Place						Squad
(Switzerland) 2012	Competitions Cancelled							
(Switzerland) 2013	Didn't Participate							
(Switzerland) 2014		Runners Up						Squad
(Switzerland) 2015	Didn't Participate							
(Switzerland) 2016	Didn't Participate							
(Switzerland) 2017	Didn't Participate							
(Switzerland) 2018	Didn't Participate							
(Switzerland) 2019	Didn't Participate							
Total	0 Titles	17/26						—

== Head-to-head record ==
This page shows United States women's national volleyball team's Head-to-head record at the Volleyball at the Summer Olympics, FIVB Women's Volleyball Nations League.

Opponent	GP	MW	ML	SW	SL
Argentina	2	2	0	6	0
Australia	1	1	0	3	0
Belgium	4	4	0	12	0
Brazil	20	12	7	43	32
Bulgaria	4	4	0	12	0
Canada	3	3	0	9	1
China	19	11	8	40	31
Croatia	2	2	0	6	1
Cuba	5	2	3	8	9
Czechoslovakia	1	0	1	1	3
Dominican Republic	8	6	2	22	6
East Germany	1	0	1	1	3
France	2	2	0	6	0
Germany	7	7	0	21	4
Italy	9	7	2	22	16
Japan	13	8	5	28	18
Kenya	1	1	0	3	0
Mexico	1	0	1	0	3
Netherlands	8	8	0	24	7
Peru	3	1	2	6	6
Poland	12	8	4	27	19
Puerto Rico	1	1	0	3	0
Romania	1	0	1	0	3
Russia	6	3	3	13	10
Serbia	12	9	3	32	15
South Korea	12	10	2	31	13
Soviet Union	3	1	2	4	8
Spain	1	1	0	3	0
Thailand	6	6	0	18	2
Turkey	12	8	4	29	23
Ukraine	1	1	0	3	0
Venezuela	1	1	0	3	1
West Germany	1	1	0	3	0
Total	184	131	51	442	234

== Current squad ==
Roster for the 2026 NORCECA Continental Championship.

Head coach: Erik Sullivan

No.	Name	Date of birth	Position	Height	2026 club
2	Jordyn Poulter	July 31, 1997	Setter	6 ft 2 in (1.88 m)	(United States) LOVB Salt Lake
3	Avery Skinner	April 25, 1999	Outside Hitter	6 ft 1 in (1.86 m)	(Italy) Pallavolo Scandicci
6	Morgan Hentz	July 27, 1998	Libero	5 ft 9 in (1.76 m)	(United States) Grand Rapids Rise
7	Asjia O’Neal	October 23, 1999	Middle Blocker	6 ft 3 in (1.90 m)	(United States) LOVB Austin
8	Lexi Rodriguez	March 11, 2003	Libero	5 ft 5 in (1.66 m)	(United States) LOVB Omaha
10	Simone Lee	October 7, 1996	Outside Hitter	6 ft 1 in (1.86 m)	(Brazil) Sesc Flamengo
11	Saige Ka'aha'aina-Torres	July 30, 2000	Setter	6 ft 0 in (1.83 m)	(United States) Grand Rapids Rise
12	Jordan Thompson	May 5, 1997	Opposite	6 ft 4 in (1.93 m)	(United States) LOVB Houston
16	Dana Rettke	January 21, 1999	Middle Blocker	6 ft 8 in (2.04 m)	(Turkey) Eczacıbaşı Dynavit
24	Chiaka Ogbogu	April 15, 1995	Middle Blocker	6 ft 1 in (1.85 m)	(Turkey) Fenerbahçe S.K.
25	Kara Hallock	March 24, 1998	Outside Hitter	6 ft 2 in (1.88 m)	(United States) San Francisco Signal
27	Madi Kubik-Banks	January 8, 2001	Outside Hitter	6 ft 3 in (1.91 m)	(United States) LOVB Austin
33	Logan Eggleston	November 13, 2000	Outside Hitter	6 ft 2 in (1.88 m)	(United States) LOVB Austin
34	Stephanie Samedy	September 27, 1998	Opposite	6 ft 2 in (1.88 m)	(Japan) Hisamitsu Springs

== Coaching staff ==
Position	Name
Head coach	(United States) Erik Sullivan
Assistant coach	(United States) Mike Wall
Assistant coach	(United States) Brandon Taliaferro
Assistant coach	(United States) Tayyiba Haneef-Park
Performance analyst	(United States) Virginia Pham
Physiotherapist	(United States) Kara Kessans
Mental Performance Coach	(United States) Katy Stanfill

== Gallery ==
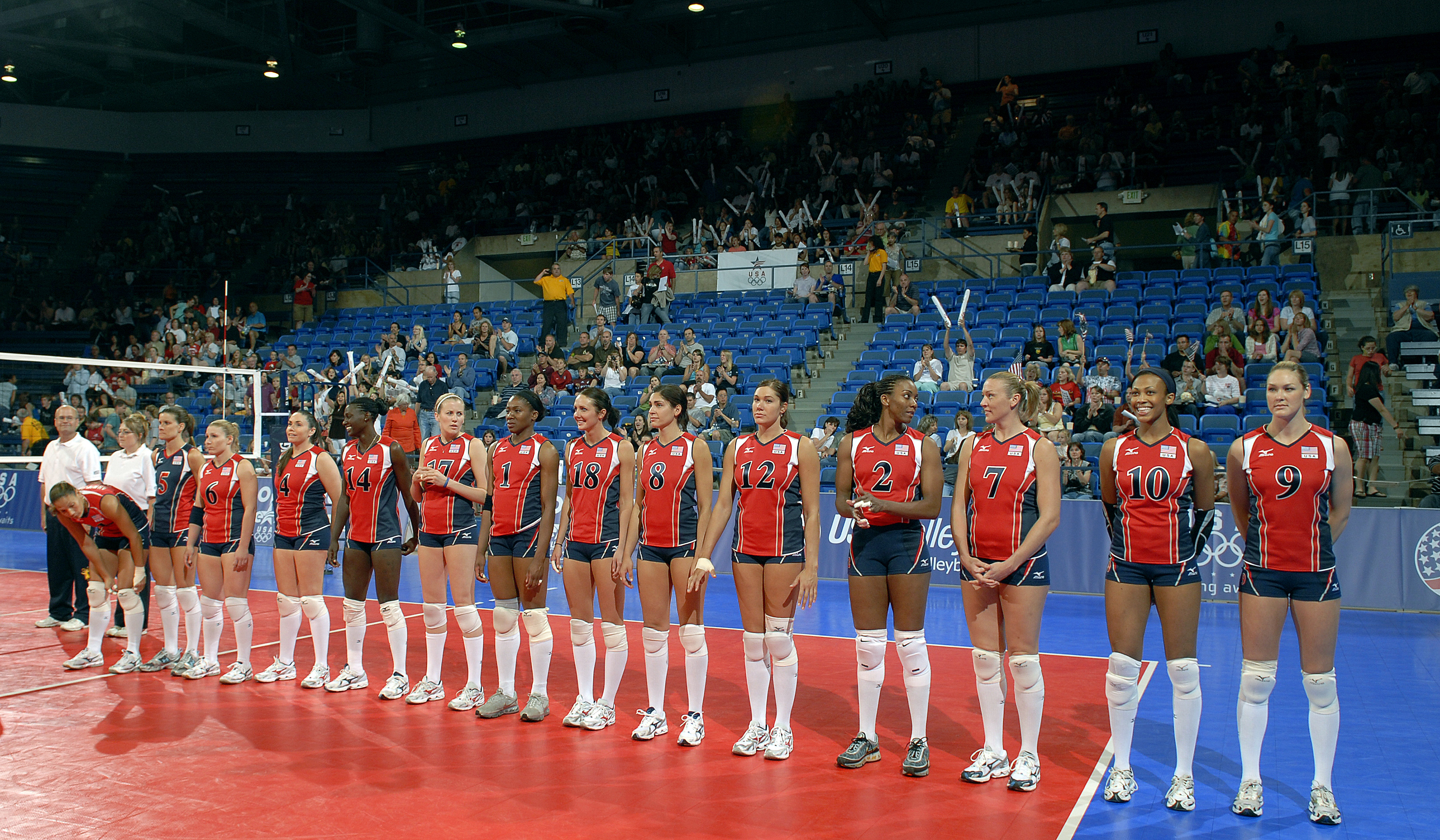
U.S. women's volleyball Olympic team of 2008

== See also ==
- United States men's national volleyball team
- United States national beach volleyball team
