= 2015 NORCECA Women's Champions Cup (Final Four) =

2015 NORCECA Champions Cup
Tournament details
- Host country: Cuba
- Dates: 5 – 7 June
- Teams: 4
- Venue: 1 (in 1 host city)

Final positions
- Champions: Dominican Republic (1st title)

Tournament awards
- MVP: (Dominican Republic) Lisvel Eve Mejia

The 2015 Women's NORCECA Champions Cup (Final Four) was played from June 5 to June 7 in Havana, Cuba. The Dominican Republic won the tournament and together with Cuba, both qualified for the 2015 FIVB Volleyball Women's World Cup in Japan.

== Qualification ==
The top four teams from the NORCECA confederation who did not yet qualify for the 2015 FIVB Volleyball Women's World Cup played a single round robin system playoff. The United States did not play because they were already qualified as 2014 World Champions. The next three best NORCECA ranking joined the host country for the tournament.

=== Qualified teams ===
- Cuba (Host)
- Dominican Republic (NORCECA Ranking 2)
- Puerto Rico (NORCECA Ranking 4)
- Canada (NORCECA Ranking 5)

== Venues ==
Havana, Cuba
Coliseo de la Ciudad Deportiva
Capacity: 15,000

== Pool standing procedure ==
1. Numbers of matches won
2. Match points
3. Points ratio
4. Sets ratio
5. Result of the last match between the tied teams

Match won 3–0: 5 match points for the winner, 0 match points for the loser
Match won 3–1: 4 match points for the winner, 1 match point for the loser
Match won 3–2: 3 match points for the winner, 2 match points for the loser

== Results ==
- All times are Cuba Daylight Time (UTC−04:00).

Pos	Team	Pld	W	L	Pts	SPW	SPL	SPR	SW	SL	SR
1	Dominican Republic	3	2	1	10	249	244	1.020	7	4	1.750
2	Cuba	3	2	1	9	275	258	1.066	7	5	1.400
3	Puerto Rico	3	2	1	9	235	222	1.059	6	4	1.500
4	Canada	3	0	3	2	229	264	0.867	2	9	0.222

Date	Time		Score		Set 1	Set 2	Set 3	Set 4	Set 5	Total	Report
5 Jun	13:30	Dominican Republic	3–1	Canada	25–20	17–25	25–19	25–22		92–86	P2 P3
5 Jun	15:30	Cuba	1–3	Puerto Rico	17–25	25–23	23–25	17–25		82–98	P2 P3
6 Jun	13:30	Puerto Rico	0–3	Dominican Republic	26–28	20–25	15–25			61–78	P2 P3
6 Jun	15:30	Cuba	3–1	Canada	21–25	25–11	25–22	25–23		96–81	P2 P3
7 Jun	15:30	Canada	0–3	Puerto Rico	21–25	17–25	24–26			62–76	P2 P3
7 Jun	18:00	Cuba	3–1	Dominican Republic	22–25	25–18	25–13	25–23		97–79	P2 P3

== Final standing ==
Rank	Team
1st place, gold medalist(s)	Dominican Republic
2nd place, silver medalist(s)	Cuba
3rd place, bronze medalist(s)	Puerto Rico
4	Canada

Qualified for the 2015 World cup

2015 NORCECA Champions Cup

Dominican Republic
1st title

== Awards ==
- Most valuable player
  (Dominican Republic) Lisvel Eve Mejia
- Best outside spiker
  (Cuba) Melissa Vargas
  (Puerto Rico) Aurea Cruz
- Best middle blocker
  (Cuba) Daymara Lescay
  (Canada) Lucille Charuk
- Best setter
  (Canada) Jennifer Lundquist
- Best opposite spiker
  (Puerto Rico) Karina Ocasio
- Best libero
  (Canada) Janie Guimod
- Best scorer
  (Cuba) Melissa Vargas
- Best server
  (Puerto Rico) Sheila Ocasio
- Best digger
  (Dominican Republic) Brenda Castillo
- Best receiver
  (Cuba) Emily Borrel

== See also ==
- 2015 NORCECA Men's Champions Cup (Final Four)
