= 2013 Women's NORCECA Volleyball Championship =

Tournament details
- Host country: United States
- Dates: September 16–21
- Teams: 9
- Venue: Ralston Arena (in Omaha host cities)

Final positions
- Champions: United States (7th title)

Tournament awards
- MVP: Kelly Murphy (USA)

The 2013 Women's NORCECA Volleyball Championship was the 23rd edition of the Women's Continental Volleyball Tournament. Nine countries competed from September 16 to September 21, 2013, in Omaha, Nebraska, United States. The United States qualified for the 2013 FIVB Women's World Grand Champions Cup, after winning the Continental Championship 3–1 in final, defeated to the Dominican Republic. Kelly Murphy of the United States won the MVP Award.

== Competing nations ==
The following national teams have qualified:

Pool A	Pool B	Pool C
Dominican Republic	United States	Puerto Rico
Costa Rica	Cuba	Canada
Trinidad and Tobago	Mexico	Saint Lucia

== Pool standing procedure ==
To establish the ranking of teams after Preliminary Round, the ranking of the teams will be determined as follows:
1. By the results of matches won and lost.
2. In case of equality in the number of matches won and lost, among two or more teams of the same group, the final ranking of the teams will be determined by the number of points gained among teams of the same group during the Preliminary Round.
3. The following points will be awarded to each team per match, according to the number of sets won/lost:

- Match won 3–0: 5 points for the winner, 0 points for the loser
- Match won 3–1: 4 points for the winner, 1 point for the loser
- Match won 3–2: 3 points for the winner, 2 points for the loser

In case of tie, the teams were classified according to the following criteria:
points ratio and sets ratio.

== First round ==
=== Pool A ===
Pos	Team	Pld	W	L	Pts	SPW	SPL	SPR	SW	SL	SR	Qualification
1	Dominican Republic	2	2	0	10	150	85	1.765	6	0	MAX	Semifinals
2	Trinidad and Tobago	2	1	1	3	156	177	0.881	3	5	0.600	Quarterfinals
3	Costa Rica	2	0	2	2	141	185	0.762	2	6	0.333	

Date	Time		Score		Set 1	Set 2	Set 3	Set 4	Set 5	Total	Report
16 Sep	16:00	Dominican Republic	3–0	Costa Rica	25–13	25–6	25–20			75–39	75–39
17 Sep	16:00	Costa Rica	2–3	Trinidad and Tobago	14–25	25–22	25–21	25–27	13–15	102–110	102–110
18 Sep	16:00	Dominican Republic	3–0	Trinidad and Tobago	25–13	25–20	25–13			75–46	75–46

=== Pool B ===
Pos	Team	Pld	W	L	Pts	SPW	SPL	SPR	SW	SL	SR	Qualification
1	United States	2	2	0	10	150	66	2.273	6	0	MAX	Semifinals
2	Mexico	2	1	1	3	144	182	0.791	3	5	0.600	Quarterfinals
3	Cuba	2	0	2	2	141	187	0.754	2	6	0.333	

Date	Time		Score		Set 1	Set 2	Set 3	Set 4	Set 5	Total	Report
16 Sep	20:00	United States	3–0	Mexico	25–9	25–12	25–11			75–32	75–32
17 Sep	20:00	Mexico	3–2	Cuba	25–18	25–23	23–25	21–25	18–16	112–107	112–107
18 Sep	20:00	Cuba	0–3	United States	9–25	13–25	12–25			34–75	34–75

=== Pool C ===
Pos	Team	Pld	W	L	Pts	SPW	SPL	SPR	SW	SL	SR	Qualification
1	Puerto Rico	2	2	0	8	175	143	1.224	6	2	3.000	Quarterfinals
2	Canada	2	1	1	7	182	137	1.328	5	3	1.667	Quarterfinals
3	Saint Lucia	2	0	2	0	73	150	0.487	0	6	0.000	

Date	Time		Score		Set 1	Set 2	Set 3	Set 4	Set 5	Total	Report
16 Sep	18:00	Puerto Rico	3–0	Saint Lucia	25–9	25–15	25–12			75–36	75–36
17 Sep	18:00	Saint Lucia	0–3	Canada	14–25	9–25	14–25			37–75	37–75
18 Sep	18:00	Canada	2–3	Puerto Rico	25–19	26–28	23–25	25–13	8–15	107–100	107–100

== Final bracket ==
Quarterfinals
19 Sep
Puerto Rico	3
Mexico	0
19 Sep
Canada	3
Trinidad and Tobago	0

Semifinals
20 Sep
Dominican Republic	3
Puerto Rico	1
20 Sep
United States	3
Canada	0

Final
21 Sep
Dominican Republic	1
United States	3
3rd place
21 Sep
Puerto Rico	3
Canada	0

=== 8th place match ===
Date	Time		Score		Set 1	Set 2	Set 3	Set 4	Set 5	Total	Report
19 Sep	16:00	Cuba	3–0	Saint Lucia	25–16	25–15	25–6			75–37	75–37

=== Quarterfinals ===
Date	Time		Score		Set 1	Set 2	Set 3	Set 4	Set 5	Total	Report
19 Sep	18:00	Canada	3–0	Trinidad and Tobago	27–25	25–11	25–22			77–58	77–58
19 Sep	20:00	Puerto Rico	3–0	Mexico	25–16	25–22	25–19			75–57	75–57

=== Semifinals ===
Date	Time		Score		Set 1	Set 2	Set 3	Set 4	Set 5	Total	Report
20 Sep	18:00	Dominican Republic	3–1	Puerto Rico	25–18	26–24	19–25	25–21		95–88	95–88
20 Sep	20:00	United States	3–0	Canada	25–22	25–14	25-15			75–36	75-51

=== 7th place match ===
Date	Time		Score		Set 1	Set 2	Set 3	Set 4	Set 5	Total	Report
20 Sep	16:00	Costa Rica	1–3	Cuba	24–26	25–23	15–25	22–25		86–99	86–99

=== 5th place match ===
Date	Time		Score		Set 1	Set 2	Set 3	Set 4	Set 5	Total	Report
21 Sep	16:00	Trinidad and Tobago	0–3	Mexico	23–25	19–25	22–25			64–75	P2P3

=== 3rd place match ===
Date	Time		Score		Set 1	Set 2	Set 3	Set 4	Set 5	Total	Report
21 Sep	18:00	Puerto Rico	3–0	Canada	25–23	25–16	25–16			75–55	P2P3

=== Final ===
Date	Time		Score		Set 1	Set 2	Set 3	Set 4	Set 5	Total	Report
21 Sep	20:00	Dominican Republic	1–3	United States	19–25	24–26	25–21	19–25		87–97	P2P3

== Final standing ==
Rank	Team
Gold medal	United States
Silver medal	Dominican Republic
Bronze medal	Puerto Rico
4	Canada
5	Mexico
6	Trinidad and Tobago
7	Cuba
8	Costa Rica
9	Saint Lucia

2013 Women's NORCECA champions

United States
7th title

== Individual awards ==
- MVP: Kelly Murphy (USA)
- Best scorer: Karina Ocasio (PUR)
- Best spiker: Kelly Murphy (USA)
- Best blocker: Sinead Jack (TRI)
- Best server: Jordan Larson (USA)
- Best digger: Brenda Castillo (DOM)
- Best setter: Alisha Glass (USA)
- Best receiver: Debora Seilhamer (PUR)
- Best libero: Janie Guimond (CAN)

== All-Star team ==
- Most valuable player
  - Kelly Murphy (USA)
- Best setter
  - Alisha Glass (USA)
- Best Opposite
  - Kelly Murphy (USA)
- Best Outside Hitters
  - Bethania de la Cruz (DOM)
  - Aurea Cruz (PUR)
- Best Middle Blockers
  - Sinead Jack (TRI)
  - Candida Arias (DOM)
- Best libero
  - Janie Guimond (CAN)
