= Amanda Vázquez =

Puerto Rican volleyball player (born 1984)

Amanda Vazquez

Personal information
- Nationality: Puerto Rico
- Born: 30 March 1984 (age 42); Honolulu, Hawaii
- Height: 1.85 m (6 ft 1 in)
- Weight: 74 kg (163 lb)
- Spike: 302 cm (119 in)
- Block: 297 cm (117 in)
- Education: University of California, Irvine

Volleyball information
- Position: Middle Blocker

Career
Years	Teams
2007-present	Mayaguez

National team
2007, 2011, 2012, 2014	Puerto Rico

Amanda Vazquez (born 30 March 1984) is a Puerto Rican female volleyball player. She is part of the Puerto Rico women's national volleyball team.

She participated in the 2014 FIVB Volleyball World Grand Prix. On club level she played for Mayaguez in 2014.
