= Dolly Meléndez =

Puerto Rican volleyball player (born 1984)

Personal information
- Nationality: Puerto Rican
- Born: April 16, 1984 (age 42)
- Height: 1.78 m (5 ft 10 in)
- Weight: 69 kg (152 lb)
- Spike: 295 cm (116 in)
- Block: 251 cm (99 in)

National team
Puerto Rico

Dolly Meléndez (born April 16, 1984) is a retired Puerto Rican female volleyball that played with the Puerto Rican national team.

She was part of the Puerto Rico women's national volleyball team at the 2002 FIVB Volleyball Women's World Championship in Germany, She played for Criollas de Caguas, winning the 2002 league championship.

== Clubs ==
- (Puerto Rico) Criollas de Caguas (2002-2006)
