= Volleyball at the 1955 Pan American Games =

This page presents the results of the men's and women's volleyball tournament during the 1955 Pan American Games, which was held from March 15 to March 24, 1955 in Mexico City, Mexico.

== Men's indoor tournament ==
=== Preliminary round robin ===
| Date | | Score | | Set 1 | Set 2 | Set 3 | Set 4 | Set 5 | Total | Report |
|---|---|---|---|---|---|---|---|---|---|---|
| Mar 16 | Mexico | 3–0 | Uruguay | 15–9 | 15–10 | 15–6 | | | 45–24 | |
| Mar 16 | United States | 3–0 | Venezuela | 15–6 | 15–9 | 15–3 | | | 45–18 | |
| Mar 17 | Mexico | 3–1 | Brazil | 15–8 | 15–11 | 11–15 | 15–8 | | 56–42 | |
| Mar 17 | Cuba | 3–2 | Uruguay | 5–15 | 15–13 | 6–15 | 15–7 | 15–5 | 56–55 | |
| Mar 18 | United States | 3–0 | Brazil | 15–6 | 15–10 | 15–8 | | | 45–24 | |
| Mar 18 | Cuba | 3–1 | Venezuela | 12–15 | 15–10 | 15–?? | 15–?? | | 57–?? | |

=== Final ranking ===
| Place | Team |
|---|---|
| 1. | United States |
| 2. | Mexico |
| 3. | Brazil |
| 4. | Cuba |
| 5. | Uruguay |
| 6. | Venezuela |

1955 Pan American Games winners

United States
First title

== Women's indoor tournament ==
=== Final ranking ===
| Place | Team |
|---|---|
| 1. | Mexico |
| 2. | United States |
| 3. | Brazil |
| 4. | Dominican Republic |

1955 Pan American Games winners

Mexico
First title
