= Angela Pressey =

American volleyball player (born 1986)

Personal information
- Nationality: American
- Born: June 6, 1986 (age 40)
- Height: 1.73 m (5 ft 8 in)
- Weight: 74 kg (163 lb)
- Spike: 289 cm (114 in)
- Block: 266 cm (105 in)

Volleyball information
- Position: outside hitter/libero
- Number: 20

National team
- Years: Team
- 2010: United States
Medal record
Women's volleyball
Representing United States
Pan American Games
Bronze medal – third place	2011 Guadalajara	Team

Angela Pressey (born June 6, 1986) is a retired American female volleyball player. She was part of the United States women's national volleyball team at the 2010 FIVB Volleyball Women's World Championship in Japan.
