= Eva Cruz =

Puerto Rican volleyball player (born 1974)

Eva Marie Cruz Dalmau

Personal information
- Full name: Eva Marie Cruz Dalmau
- Nickname: La Reina
- Nationality: Puerto Rican
- Height: 182 cm (6 ft 0 in)

Volleyball information
- Position: Wing spiker
Honours
Women's volleyball
Representing Puerto Rico
NORCECA Championship
Silver medal – second place	2009 Bayamón	Team
Central American and Caribbean Games
Bronze medal – third place	2006 Cartagena	Team

Eva Marie Cruz Dalmau (born January 22, 1974, in Toa Baja, Puerto Rico), known as Eva Cruz, is a former member of the Puerto Rican national volleyball team. Cruz played for Valencianas of Juncos in the Puerto Rican league of volleyball. She is for many "La Reina" (the queen) of volleyball in Puerto Rico.

Cruz participated at the 2002 FIVB Women's Volleyball World Championship in Germany. She was the first player in the Puerto Rican women's volleyball league (Liga de Voleibol Superior Femenino) to achieve 4,000 points. She reached this mark on February 27, 2009. She reached 2,000 digs and 200 aces on February 2, 2007, becoming the second in league history.

== Awards ==
=== Individuals ===
- 2006 Central American and Caribbean Games "Best Attacker"

== See also ==
- Volleyball in Puerto Rico
