= Yarimar Rosa =

Puerto Rican volleyball player (born 1988)

Personal information
- Nationality: Puerto Rican
- Born: June 20, 1988 (age 38) Vega Baja, Puerto Rico
- Height: 1.78 m (5 ft 10 in)
- Weight: 62 kg (137 lb)
- Spike: 295 cm (116 in)
- Block: 285 cm (112 in)

Volleyball information
- Position: Outside hitter
- Number: 6

Career
- Years: Team
- 2014: Indias de Mayagüez

National team
- Years: Team
- 2003–2016: Puerto Rico

Yarimar Rosa (born June 20, 1988) is a Puerto Rican volleyball player.

She is a member of the Puerto Rico women's national volleyball team and played for Indias de Mayagüez in 2014. She was part of the Puerto Rican national team at the 2014 FIVB Volleyball Women's World Championship in Italy, and at the 2015 FIVB World Grand Prix.

== Clubs ==
- (Puerto Rico) Indias de Mayagüez (2014)
