= Braulio Godínez =

Mexican footballer (born 1984)

Personal information
- Full name: Braulio Antonio Godínez Durán
- Date of birth: 27 March 1984 (age 42)
- Place of birth: Silao, Guanajuato, Mexico
- Height: 1.80 m (5 ft 11 in)
- Position: Defender

Senior career*
Years	Team	Apps	(Gls)
2003–2010	Pachuca	19	(0)
2008	→ Indios (loan)	3	(0)
2009	→ Dorados (loan)	13	(0)
2010–2012	Indios	41	(2)
2012–2013	La Piedad	27	(1)
2013–2014	Oaxaca	11	(0)
2014	Mérida	8	(1)
2015	Oaxaca	5	(0)
2015–2016	Lobos BUAP	5	(0)
- * Club domestic league appearances and goals as of 31 July 2013

Braulio Antonio Godínez Durán (Note: In this Spanish name, the first or paternal surname is Godínez and the second or maternal family name is Durán.) (born 27 March 1984), known as Braulio Godínez, is a Mexican retired footballer, who played as defender for Alebrijes de Oaxaca of Liga MX.

== Club career ==
After making his Mexican Primera División debut with C.F. Pachuca in 2003, Godínez has spent most of his career playing for Indios de Ciudad Juárez or its affiliate clubs. In 2012, when Indios were dissolved he returned to Liga de Ascenso side Dorados de Sinaloa.
