= Puerto Rico women's national volleyball team =

National sports team

Puerto Rico
- Association: Puerto Rican Volleyball Federation
- Confederation: NORCECA
- Head coach: José Mieles
- FIVB ranking: 23 (24 May 2026)

Uniforms
Home	Away

Summer Olympics
- Appearances: 1 (First in 2016)
- Best result: 11th place (2016)

World Championship
- Appearances: 9 (First in 1974)
- Best result: 10th place (2002)
- www.fedpurvoli.com
Honours
Medal record
Challenger Cup
Silver medal – second place	2024 Manila	Team
Bronze medal – third place	2018 Lima	Team
Bronze medal – third place	2022 Zadar	Team
Pan-American Cup
Silver medal – second place	2023 Ponce	Team
Silver medal – second place	2016 Santo Domingo	Team
Bronze medal – third place	2009 Miami	Team
Bronze medal – third place	2014 Mexico City	Team
Bronze medal – third place	2017 Cañete	Team
NORCECA Championship
Silver medal – second place	2009 Bayamón	Team
Silver medal – second place	2021 Guadalajara	Team
Bronze medal – third place	2013 Omaha	Team
Bronze medal – third place	2015 Michoacan	Team
NORCECA Championship Cup
Bronze medal – third place	2015 Havana
NORCECA Pan-American Cup Final Six
Bronze medal – third place	2022 Santo Domingo
Central American and Caribbean Games
Silver medal – second place	1938 Panama City	Team
Silver medal – second place	1946 Barranquilla	Team
Silver medal – second place	1962 Kingston	Team
Silver medal – second place	2010 Mayagüez	Team
Silver medal – second place	2014 Veracruz	Team
Silver medal – second place	2023 San Salvador	Team
Bronze medal – third place	2006 Cartagena	Team
Bronze medal – third place	2018 Barranquilla	Team

The Puerto Rico women's national volleyball team is part of the NORCECA zone. Puerto Rico has taken one silver and two bronze medals in the NORCECA Women's Volleyball Championship, one silver and three bronzes in the Pan-American Cup, and five silvers and one bronze at the Central American and Caribbean Games. The team has participated at least once in all FIVB competitions, except for the World Cup.

== Results ==
=== Summer Olympics ===
Champions Runners up Third place Fourth place

Summer Olympics record
Year	Round	Position	Pld	W	L	SW	SL	Squad
(Brazil) 2016	Group stage	11th Place	5	0	5	0	15	Squad
Total	0 titles	1/16	5	0	5	0	15	—

=== World Championship ===
Champions Runners up Third place Fourth place

World Championship record
Year	Round	Position	Pld	W	L	SW	SL	Squad
(Soviet Union) 1952	did not enter							
(France) 1956	did not enter							
(Brazil) 1960	did not enter							
(Soviet Union) 1962	did not enter							
(Japan) 1967	did not enter							
(Bulgaria) 1970	did not qualify							
(Mexico) 1974	Round 1	22nd Place	2	0	2	0	6	Squad
(Soviet Union) 1978	did not qualify							
(Peru) 1982	Round 1	17th Place	3	0	3	0	9	Squad
(Czechoslovakia) 1986	did not qualify							
(China) 1990	did not qualify							

World Championship record
Year	Round	Position	Pld	W	L	SW	SL	Squad
(Brazil) 1994	did not qualify							
(Japan) 1998	did not qualify							
(Germany) 2002	Round 2	12th Place	8	3	5	9	15	Squad
(Japan) 2006	Round 2	16th Place	9	2	7	6	22	Squad
(Japan) 2010	Round 1	20th Place	5	1	4	3	12	Squad
(Italy) 2014	Round 1	17th Place	5	1	4	5	12	Squad
(Japan) 2018	Round 2	14th Place	9	3	6	10	19	Squad
(Netherlands) / (Poland) 2022	Round 2	15th place	9	3	6	10	20	Squad
(Thailand) 2025	Round 1	28th place	3	0	3	2	9	Squad
(Canada) / (United States) 2027	Qualified							
(Philippines) 2029	to be determined							
Total	0 titles	10/22	53	13	40	45	124	—

=== World Grand Prix ===
Champions Runners up Third place Fourth place

World Grand Prix record
Year	Round	Position	Pld	W	L	SW	SL	Squad
(Hong Kong) 1993	did not enter							
(China) 1994	did not enter							
(China) 1995	did not enter							
(China) 1996	did not enter							
(Japan) 1997	did not enter							
(Hong Kong) 1998	did not enter							
(China) 1999	did not enter							
(Philippines) 2000	did not enter							
(Macau) 2001	did not enter							
(Hong Kong) 2002	did not enter							
(Italy) 2003	did not enter							
(Italy) 2004	did not qualify							
(Japan) 2005	did not qualify							
(Italy) 2006	did not qualify							
(China) 2007	did not qualify							
(Japan) 2008	did not qualify							
(Japan) 2009	Preliminary Rounds	10th Place	9	2	7	9	25	Squad
(China) 2010	Preliminary Rounds	11th Place	9	1	8	7	24	Squad
(Macau) 2011	did not qualify							
(China) 2012	Preliminary Round	13th Place	9	2	7	8	24	Squad

World Grand Prix record
Year	Round	Position	Pld	W	L	SW	SL	Squad
(Japan) 2013	Preliminary Round	18th Place	9	1	8	5	26	Squad
(China) 2014	Group 2 Finals	15th Place	11	8	3	25	15	Squad
(United States) 2015	Group 2 finals	16th place	8	4	4	16	17	Squad
(Thailand) 2016	Group 2 Finals	15th place	8	7	1	22	8	Squad
(China) 2017	Intercontinental Round	18th place	9	5	4	17	19	Squad
Total	0 titles	8/25						

=== Challenger Cup ===
Champions Runners up Third place Fourth place

Challenger Cup record
Year	Round	Position	Pld	W	L	SW	SL	Squad
(Peru) 2018	Semifinals	Third place	4	2	2	7	8	Squad
(Peru) 2019	did not qualify							
(Croatia) 2022	Semifinals	Third place	3	2	1	7	4	Squad
(France) 2023	did not qualify							
(Philippines) 2024	Final	Runners-up	3	2	1	7	3	Squad
Total	0 titles	3/5	10	6	4	21	15	

=== Pan American Cup ===
Champions Runners-up Third place Fourth place

Pan-American Cup record
Year	Round	Position	Pld	W	L	SW	SL	Squad
(Mexico) 2002	Round robin	7th place						Squad
(Mexico) 2003	Round robin	7th place						Squad
(Mexico) 2004	Round robin	6th place						Squad
(Dominican Republic) 2005	Quarter-finals	5th place						Squad
(Puerto Rico) 2006	Quarter-finals	5th place						Squad
(Mexico) 2007	Quarter-finals	5th place						Squad
(Mexico) 2008	Semi-finals	Fourth place						Squad
(United States) 2009	Semi-finals	Third place						Squad
(Mexico) 2010	Quarter-finals	6th place						Squad
(Mexico) 2011	Quarter-finals	5th place						Squad
(Mexico) 2012	Round robin	6th place						Squad
(Peru) 2013	Round robin	5th place	6	4	2	14	9	Squad

Pan-American Cup record
Year	Round	Position	Pld	W	L	SW	SL	Squad
(Mexico) 2014	Semi-finals	Third place	7	4	3	12	11	Squad
(Peru) 2015	Quarter-finals	6th place	8	3	5	14	12	Squad
(Dominican Republic) 2016	Final	2nd place	8	6	2	20	7	Squad
(Peru) 2017	Semi-finals	Third place	8	6	2	20	8	Squad
(Dominican Republic) 2018	Quarter-finals	6th place	5	3	2	11	8	Squad
(Peru) 2019	Semi-finals	Fourth place	7	4	3	14	11	Squad
(Dominican Republic) 2021	Semi-finals	6th place	6	0	6	2	18	Squad
(Mexico) 2022	Quarter-finals	6th place	5	2	3	8	11	Squad
(Puerto Rico) 2023	Final	2nd place	7	4	3	17	15	Squad
Total	0 titles	21/21						

=== Pan American Games ===
Champions Runners up Third place Fourth place

Pan American Games record
Year	Round	Position	Pld	W	L	SW	SL	Squad
(Mexico) 1955	did not enter							
(United States) 1959		4th Place						Squad
(Brazil) 1963		5th Place						Squad
(Canada) 1967	did not enter							
(Colombia) 1971	did not enter							
(Mexico) 1975		7th Place						Squad
(Puerto Rico) 1979		8th Place						Squad
(Venezuela) 1983	did not enter							
(United States) 1987	did not enter							
(Cuba) 1991	did not enter							
(Argentina) 1995	did not enter							
(Canada) 1999	did not enter							

Pan American Games record
Year	Round	Position	Pld	W	L	SW	SL	Squad
(Dominican Republic) 2003		6th Place	3	1	2	6	6	Squad
(Brazil) 2007		6th Place	3	1	2	5	6	Squad
(Mexico) 2011	Quarterfinals	5th Place	4	2	2	8	8	Squad
(Canada) 2015	Semifinal	4th place	6	2	4	11	14	Squad
(Peru) 2019		5th place	4	2	2	8	9	Squad
(Chile) 2023	Quarterfinals	7th place	4	1	3	4	9	Squad
Total	0 titles	10/18						

=== Central American & Caribbean Games ===
Champions Runners up Third place Fourth place

Central American & Caribbean Games record
Year	Round	Position	Pld	W	L	SW	SL	Squad
(Panama) 1938	Round Robin	Runners Up						Squad
(Colombia) 1946	Round Robin	Runners Up						Squad
(Venezuela) 1959	did not enter							
(Jamaica) 1962	Round Robin	Runners Up						Squad
(Puerto Rico) 1966	Round Robin	5th Place						Squad
(Panama) 1970	did not enter							
(Dominican Republic) 1974	Round Robin	4th Place						Squad
(Colombia) 1978	Round Robin	5th Place						Squad
(Cuba) 1982	Semifinals	4th Place						Squad
(Dominican Republic) 1986		5th Place						Squad
(Mexico) 1990		5th Place						Squad
(Puerto Rico) 1993		5th Place						Squad

Central American & Caribbean Games record
Year	Round	Position	Pld	W	L	SW	SL	Squad
(Venezuela) 1998	Semifinals	4th Place						Squad
(El Salvador) 2002	Semifinals	4th Place	5	3	2	12	9	Squad
(Colombia) 2006	Semifinals	Third Place	5	3	2	11	6	Squad
(Puerto Rico) 2010	Final Round	Runners Up	5	4	1	14	3	Squad
(Mexico) 2014	Final Round	Runners Up	5	3	2	11	9	Squad
(Colombia) 2018	Semi Finals	Third Place	6	4	2	12	9	Squad
(El Salvador) 2023	Final Round	Runners Up	5	3	2	10	8	Squad
Total	0 titles	17/19						

=== NORCECA Championship ===
Champions Runners up Third place Fourth place

NORCECA Championship record
Year	Round	Position	Pld	W	L	SW	SL	Squad
(Mexico) 1969		5th Place						Squad
(Cuba) 1971		4th Place						Squad
(Mexico) 1973		6th Place						Squad
(United States) 1975	did not enter							
(Dominican Republic) 1977		5th Place						Squad
(Cuba) 1979	did not enter							
(Mexico) 1981		6th Place						Squad
(United States) 1983		5th Place						Squad
(Dominican Republic) 1985		4th Place						Squad
(Cuba) 1987		5th Place						Squad
(Puerto Rico) 1989		6th Place						Squad
(Canada) 1991		6th Place						Squad
(United States) 1993		5th Place						Squad
(Dominican Republic) 1995		5th Place						Squad
(Puerto Rico) 1997		5th Place						Squad
(Mexico) 1999		5th Place						Squad
(Dominican Republic) 2001	did not enter							
(Dominican Republic) 2003		5th Place						Squad
(Trinidad and Tobago) 2005	Semifinals	4th Place						Squad
(Canada) 2007		5th Place						Squad

NORCECA Championship record
Year	Round	Position	Pld	W	L	SW	SL	Squad
(Puerto Rico) 2009	Final Round	Runners Up						Squad
(Puerto Rico) 2011	Semifinals	4th Place						Squad
(United States) 2013	Semifinals	Third Place	5	4	1	13	5	Squad
(Mexico) 2015	Semifinals	Third place	6	4	2	14	10	Squad
0 titles	21/24							

=== Olympic qualifiers ===
Olympic Volleyball Qualifiers
Year	Round	Position	Pld	W	L	SW	SL
(Japan) 2004	Final Round	6th Place	7	2	5	6	16
(Japan) 2008	Final Round	8th Place	7	1	6	5	20
(Mexico) 2012	Semi-finals	Third Place	8	6	2	14	8
(Puerto Rico) 2016	Round Robin	1st place	3	3	0	9	0
(Dominican Republic) 2020	Round Robin	2nd place	3	2	1	6	5
Total		2/9	28	14	14	40	49

== Team ==
=== Current squad ===
The following is the Puerto Rican roster in the 2018 World Championship.

Head coach: José Mieles

No.	Name	Date of birth	Height	Weight	Spike	Block	2017–18 club
1	Daly Santana	19 February 1995	1.82 m (6 ft 0 in)	72 kg (159 lb)	243 cm (96 in)	219 cm (86 in)	(Italy) Il Bisonte Firenze
2	Shara Venegas	18 September 1992	1.73 m (5 ft 8 in)	68 kg (150 lb)	280 cm (110 in)	272 cm (107 in)	(Puerto Rico) Llaneras de Toa Baja
3	Valeria León	21 May 1995	1.66 m (5 ft 5 in)	67 kg (148 lb)	248 cm (98 in)	242 cm (95 in)	(Puerto Rico) Leonas de Ponce
4	Raymariely Santos	13 April 1992	1.83 m (6 ft 0 in)	73 kg (161 lb)	290 cm (110 in)	288 cm (113 in)	(Puerto Rico) Indias de Mayagüez
5	Julymar Otero	31 October 1996	1.77 m (5 ft 10 in)	65 kg (143 lb)	235 cm (93 in)	239 cm (94 in)	Free agent
7	Stephanie Enright	15 December 1990	1.79 m (5 ft 10 in)	56 kg (123 lb)	300 cm (120 in)	292 cm (115 in)	(Italy) Igor Gorgonzola Novara
11	Karina Ocasio	1 August 1985	1.92 m (6 ft 4 in)	76 kg (168 lb)	298 cm (117 in)	288 cm (113 in)	(Puerto Rico) Criollas de Caguas
12	Neira Ortiz	6 July 1993	1.92 m (6 ft 4 in)	68 kg (150 lb)	262 cm (103 in)	256 cm (101 in)	Free agent
14	Natalia Valentín (c)	12 September 1989	1.70 m (5 ft 7 in)	61 kg (134 lb)	244 cm (96 in)	240 cm (94 in)	(France) Saint-Raphaël Var VB
17	Noami Santos	29 November 1995	1.92 m (6 ft 4 in)	63 kg (139 lb)	309 cm (122 in)	300 cm (120 in)	(Puerto Rico) Capitalinas de San Juan
16	Alba Hernández	3 October 1995	2.07 m (6 ft 9 in)	87 kg (192 lb)	305 cm (120 in)	293 cm (115 in)	(Puerto Rico) Changas de Naranjito
19	Ana Sofía Jusino	5 January 1995	1.89 m (6 ft 2 in)	65 kg (143 lb)	310 cm (120 in)	294 cm (116 in)	(Puerto Rico) Criollas de Caguas
22	Adriana Vinas Joy	1 March 1994	1.78 m (5 ft 10 in)	74 kg (163 lb)	245 cm (96 in)	237 cm (93 in)	(Puerto Rico) Gigantes de Carolina
23	Diana Reyes	29 April 1993	1.91 m (6 ft 3 in)	80 kg (180 lb)	303 cm (119 in)	299 cm (118 in)	(Puerto Rico) Criollas de Caguas

=== Former squads ===
- 2002 World Championship — 12th place
  Dariam Acevedo, Áurea Cruz, Eva Cruz, Tatiana Encarnación, Lourdes Isern, Dolly Meléndez, Vilmarie Mojica, Xiomara Molero, Karina Ocasio, Yarleen Santiago, and Jetzabel Del Valle. Head coach: David Alemán.
- 2004 Olympic Qualifying Tournament — 6th place (did not qualify)
  Sarai Álvarez, Michelle Cardona, Áurea Cruz, Eva Cruz, Omayra George, Xiomara Molero, Karina Ocasio, Sheila Ocasio, Alexandra Oquendo, Yarleen Santiago, Shannon Torregrosa, and Shirley Pérez. Head coach: David Alemán.
- 2006 Pan-American Cup — 5th place
  Sarai Álvarez, Áurea Cruz, Eva Cruz, Tatiana Encarnación, Vilmarie Mojica, Karina Ocasio, Sheila Ocasio, Alexandra Oquendo, Glorimar Ortega, Yarleen Santiago, Shannon Torregrosa, and Jetzabel Del Valle.
- 2006 Central American and Caribbean Games — Bronze Medal
  Vilmarie Mojica, Tatiana Encarnación, Yarleen Santiago, Eva Cruz, Áurea Cruz, Vanessa Vélez, Karina Ocasio, Dariam Acevedo, Glorimar Ortega, Shannon Torregrosa, Alexandra Oquendo, and Sheila Ocasio. Head coach: Juan Carlos Núñez.
- 2006 World Championship — 16th place
  Sarai Álvarez, Áurea Cruz, Eva Cruz, Xaimara Colón, Tatiana Encarnación, Vilmarie Mojica, Karina Ocasio, Sheila Ocasio, Glorimar Ortega, Alexandra Oquendo, Yarleen Santiago, and Jetzabel Del Valle. Head coach: Juan Carlos Núñez.
- 2007 Pan American Games — 6th place
  Dariam Acevedo, Sarai Álvarez, Áurea Cruz, Eva Cruz, Michelle Cardona, Tatiana Encarnación, Vilmarie Mojica, Karina Ocasio, Sheila Ocasio, Shannon Torregrosa, Deborah Seilhamer, and Vanessa Vélez. Head coach: Juan Carlos Núñez.
- 2007 NORCECA Championship — 5th place
  Dariam Acevedo, Michelle Cardona, Áurea Cruz (c), Eva Cruz, Tatiana Encarnación, Wilnelia González, Ana Rosa Luna, Vilmarie Mojica, Sheila Ocasio, Alexandra Oquendo, and Deborah Seilhamer. Head coach: Juan Carlos Núñez.
- 2008 Olympic Qualifying Tournament — 8th place (did not qualify)
  Sarai Álvarez, Michelle Cardona, Deborah Seilhamer, Xaimara Colón, Vilmarie Mojica (c), Eva Cruz, Áurea Cruz, Karina Ocasio, Ania Ruiz, Shanon Torregrosa, Sheila Ocasio, and Jetzabel Del Valle. Head coach: Juan Carlos Núñez.
- 2013 Pan-American Volleyball Cup — 5th place
  Yarimar Rosa (c), Karina Ocasio, Sheila Ocasio, Diana Reyes, Lynda Morales, Ania Ruiz, Shara Venegas, Génesis Collazo, Natalia Valentín, Michelle Nogueras, Daly Santana and Pilar M. Victoria. Head coach: Epique Olazagasti.
- 2015 Pan-American Games — 4th place
  Yarimar Rosa (c), Karina Ocasio, Sheila Ocasio, Lynda Morales, Debora Seilhamer, Vilmarie Mojica, Aurea Cruz, Natalia Valentín, Stephanie Enright, Shirley Ferrer, Nayka Benítez and Alexandra Oquendo. Head coach: José Mieles.

== See also ==
- Puerto Rico women's national under-20 volleyball team
- Puerto Rico women's national under-18 volleyball team
- Dominicana Flight 603 - a 1970 crash where many members of the national team died
