= Ania Ruiz =

Puerto Rican volleyball player (born 1982)

Personal information
- Nationality: Puerto Rico
- Born: 11 July 1982 (age 44); Arroyo, Puerto Rico
- Height: 1.82 m (6 ft 0 in)
- Weight: 68 kg (150 lb)
- Spike: 305 cm (120 in)
- Block: 284 cm (112 in)

Career
Years	Teams
2013	Bayamon

National team
2013	Puerto Rico

Ania Ruiz (born 11 July 1982) is a Puerto Rican female volleyball player. She was part of the Puerto Rico women's national volleyball team.

She participated in the 2013 FIVB Volleyball World Grand Prix. On club level she played for Bayamon in 2013.
