= Gema León =

Mexican volleyball player

Personal information
- Nationality: Mexico
- Born: 11 March 1991 (age 35)
- Height: 1.81 m (5 ft 11 in)
- Weight: 61 kg (134 lb)
- Spike: 292 cm (115 in)
- Block: 275 cm (108 in)

Volleyball information
- Number: 1

Career
Years	Teams
2014	(Mexico) Nuevo León

Gema León (born 11 March 1991) is a Mexican female volleyball player. She is a member of the Mexico women's national volleyball team and played for Nuevo León in 2014.

She was part of the Mexico national team at the 2014 FIVB Volleyball Women's World Championship in Italy.

== Clubs ==
- (Mexico) Nuevo León (2014)
