= Alexandra Oquendo =

Puerto Rican volleyball player (born 1984)

Personal information
- Nationality: Puerto Rican
- Born: February 3, 1984 (age 42); San Juan, Puerto Rico
- Height: 1.89 m (6 ft 2 in)
- Weight: 75 kg (165 lb)
- Spike: 297 cm (117 in)
- Block: 284 cm (112 in)

Volleyball information
- Current club: Polluelas de Aibonito

National team
Puerto Rico

Alexandra Oquendo (born February 3, 1984) is a Puerto Rican volleyball player who represented her home country at the 2016 Summer Olympics.

== Career ==
She was part of the Puerto Rico women's national volleyball team at the 2014 FIVB Volleyball Women's World Championship in Italy. She participated at the 2016 Olympic Games in Rio de Janeiro.

Oquendo played for Leonas de Ponce in 2015 and Lancheras de Cataño for the 2016 Puerto Rican league season. When her club moved to Aibonito, she stayed with this club, then Polluelas de Aibonito.

== Clubs ==
- (Puerto Rico) Criollas de Caguas (2014)
- (Puerto Rico) Leonas de Ponce (2015)
- (Puerto Rico) Lancheras de Cataño (2016)
- (Puerto Rico) Polluelas de Aibonito (2017)
