= Marcos Kwiek =

Brazilian volleyball coach

Current position
- Title: Head coach

Biographical details
- Born: July 18, 1967 (age 59); São Paulo

Marcos Kwiek (born 18 July 1967) is a volleyball coach from Brazil. He took over in May 2008 from Beato Miguel Cruz as the head coach of the Dominican Women's National Team, whom he guided to the 8th place at the 2008 Grand Prix.

== National Teams ==
- (Brazil) Brazilian Women's National Team (2003–2007) Assistant Coach
- (Dominican Republic) Dominican Women's National Team (2008–) Head Coach

== Clubs ==
Club	Country	From	To
Grêmio Recreativo Barueri	Brazil	1995	1996
Aché Clube - Dayvit	Brazil	1997	1998
Universidade de Guarulhos	Brazil	1998	1999
Associação Brasileira A Hebraica de São Paulo	Brazil	1999	2001
Associação Desportiva Classista	Brazil	2001	2002
Associação Desportiva Classista Finasa	Brazil	2002	2005
Unisul Esporte Clube	Brazil	2005	2006
Esporte Clube Pinheiros	Brazil	2007	2007
Mirador	Dominican Republic	2010	2015
Sesi Bauru	Brazil	2022	2022
