= Mijal Hines Cuza =

Costa Rican volleyball and basketball player

Personal information
- Full name: Mijal Arantxa Hines Cuza
- Nickname: Mijal
- Born: December 15, 1993 (age 32); Heredia, Costa Rica
- Hometown: Heredia, Costa Rica
- Height: 1.85 m (6 ft 1 in)
- Weight: 84 kg (185 lb)
- Spike: 290 cm (114 in)
- Block: 280 cm (110 in)

Volleyball information
- Current club: Goicoechea
- Number: 16

National team
Costa Rica
Honours
Women's volleyball
Representing Costa Rica
Central American and Caribbean Games
Bronze medal – third place	2010 Mayagüez	Team

Mijal Arantxa Hines Cuza (born December 15, 1993, in Heredia) is a volleyball and basketball player from Costa Rica, who played with the Costa Rica women's national volleyball team in the 2009 Women's Pan-American Volleyball Cup in Miami, Florida. There her team finished in 8th place. She also participated at the 2010 World Championship NORCECA Qualification Pool G, in Orlando, Florida, finishing in second place, and qualifying for the continental play-off. She uses the #16 jersey.

== Basketball ==
In basketball, she participated in the COCABA U16 Championship for Women 2008.

== Personal life ==
Her father is former Costa Rica national football team player César Hines.

== Awards ==
=== Individuals ===
- 2014 Central American and Caribbean Games "Best Middle Blocker"
