= Kelly-Anne Billingy =

Trinidad and Tobago volleyball player (born 1986)

Personal information
- Nationality: Trinidad and Tobago
- Born: 15 May 1986 (age 40)
- Height: 187 cm (74 in)
- Weight: 87 kg (192 lb)
- Spike: 316 cm (124 in)
- Block: 303 cm (119 in)
- Education: Marshall University

Volleyball information
- Position: outside hitter
- Number: 4 (national team)

National team
| 2011 | Trinidad and Tobago |

Kelly-Anne Billingy (born 15 May 1986) is a retired Trinidad and Tobago female volleyball player. She was part of the Trinidad and Tobago women's national volleyball team.

She participated in the 2011 Women's Pan-American Volleyball Cup.
