= Dominican Republic women's national volleyball team =

National sports team

Dominican Republic
- Association: Confederación Dominicana de Voleibol
- Confederation: NORCECA
- Head coach: Marcos Kwiek
- FIVB ranking: 11 (24 May 2026)

Uniforms
Home	Away

Summer Olympics
- Appearances: 4 (First in 2004)
- Best result: 5th place (2012)

World Championship
- Appearances: 10 (First in 1974)
- Best result: 5th place (2014)

World Cup
- Appearances: 5 (First in 2003)
- Best result: 7th place (2015, 2019)
- www.fedovoli.org (in Spanish)
Honours
FIVB World Grand Champions Cup
Bronze medal – third place	2009 Japan
Pan American Games
Gold medal – first place	2003 Santo Domingo	Team
Gold medal – first place	2019 Lima	Team
Gold medal – first place	2023 Santiago	Team
Bronze medal – third place	2015 Toronto	Team
Pan-American Cup
Gold medal – first place	2008 Tijuana/Mexicali
Gold medal – first place	2010 Rosarito/Tijuana
Gold medal – first place	2014 Ciudad de México
Gold medal – first place	2016 Santo Domingo
Gold medal – first place	2021 Santo Domingo
Gold medal – first place	2022 Hermosillo
Silver medal – second place	2002 Mexicali
Silver medal – second place	2003 Saltillo
Silver medal – second place	2005 Santo Domingo
Silver medal – second place	2009 Miami
Silver medal – second place	2011 Ciudad Juárez
Silver medal – second place	2013 Lima
Silver medal – second place	2015 Lima/Callao
Silver medal – second place	2017 Lima/Cañete
Silver medal – second place	2018 Santo Domingo
Silver medal – second place	2019 Trujillo/Chiclayo
Bronze medal – third place	2004 Tijuana/Mexicali
Bronze medal – third place	2006 San Juan
Bronze medal – third place	2007 Colima
NORCECA Championship
Gold medal – first place	2009 Bayamón
Gold medal – first place	2019 San Juan
Gold medal – first place	2021 Guadalajara
Gold medal – first place	2023 Quebec City
Silver medal – second place	2011 Caguas
Silver medal – second place	2013 Omaha
Silver medal – second place	2015 Morelia
Bronze medal – third place	1997 Caguas
Bronze medal – third place	2001 Santo Domingo
Bronze medal – third place	2003 Santo Domingo
Bronze medal – third place	2005 Port of Spain
Bronze medal – third place	2007 Winnipeg
Final Four Cup
Gold medal – first place	2010 Chiapas
Silver medal – second place	2008 Fortaleza
Bronze medal – third place	2009 Lima
Central American and Caribbean Games
Gold medal – first place	1946 Barranquilla
Gold medal – first place	1962 Kingston
Gold medal – first place	2002 San Salvador
Gold medal – first place	2006 Cartagena
Gold medal – first place	2010 Mayaguez
Gold medal – first place	2014 Veracruz
Gold medal – first place	2018 Barranquilla
Silver medal – second place	1998 Maracaibo
Bronze medal – third place	1966 San Juan
Bronze medal – third place	1974 Santo Domingo
Bronze medal – third place	1978 Medellín
Bronze medal – third place	1982 Havana

The Dominican Republic women's national volleyball team had its biggest recent win in 2023, when the team beat out the USA in 5 sets at the 2023 NORCECA Women’s Championship in Quebec. The team is ranked 11th in the FIVB world ranking as of 8 January 2025.

== Results ==
=== Summer Olympics ===
Champions Runners-up Third place Fourth place

Summer Olympics record
Year	Round	Position	Pld	W	L	SW	SL	Squad
(Japan) 1964	did not qualify							
(Mexico) 1968	did not qualify							
(West Germany) 1972	did not qualify							
(Canada) 1976	did not qualify							
(Soviet Union) 1980	did not qualify							
(United States) 1984	did not qualify							
(South Korea) 1988	did not qualify							
(Spain) 1992	did not qualify							
(United States) 1996	did not qualify							
(Australia) 2000	did not qualify							
(Greece) 2004	Preliminary round	11th place	5	1	4	3	14	Squad
(China) 2008	did not qualify							
(United Kingdom) 2012	Quarterfinals	5th place	6	2	4	8	12	Squad
(Brazil) 2016	did not qualify							
(Japan) 2020	Quarterfinals	8th place	6	2	4	10	13	Squad
(France) 2024	Quarterfinals	8th place	4	1	3	5	10	Squad
(United States) 2028	future events							
(Australia) 2032	future events							
Total	0 titles	4/18	21	6	15	26	49	—

=== World Championship ===
Champions Runners up Third place Fourth place

World Championship record
Year	Round	Position	Pld	W	L	SW	SL	Squad
(Soviet Union) 1952	did not enter							
(France) 1956	did not enter							
(Brazil) 1960	did not enter							
(Soviet Union) 1962	did not enter							
(Japan) 1967	did not enter							
(Bulgaria) 1970	did not qualify							
(Mexico) 1974	did not qualify							
(Soviet Union) 1978	17th–20th places	19th Place	5	1	4	4	14	squad
(Peru) 1982	did not qualify							
(Czechoslovakia) 1986	did not qualify							
(China) 1990	did not qualify							
(Brazil) 1994	did not qualify							
(Japan) 1998	Second round	11th Place	8	1	7	5	23	Squad
(Germany) 2002	First round	13th Place	5	2	3	7	9	Squad
(Japan) 2006	First round	17th Place	5	1	4	5	12	Squad
(Japan) 2010	First round	17th Place	5	1	4	6	13	Squad
(Italy) 2014	Third round	5th Place	11	7	4	27	22	Squad
(Japan) 2018	Second round	9th Place	9	5	4	17	12	Squad
(Netherlands) / (Poland) 2022	Second round	11th place	9	4	5	19	17	Squad
(Thailand) 2025	Round of 16	14th place	4	2	2	7	6	Squad
(Canada) / (United States) 2027	qualified							
(Philippines) 2029	to be determined							
Total	0 Titles	10/22	61	24	37	97	128	—

=== World Grand Champions Cup ===
Champions Runners up Third place Fourth place

World Grand Champions record
Year	Round	Position	Pld	W	L	SW	SL	Squad
(Japan) 1993	did not qualify							
(Japan) 1997	did not qualify							
(Japan) 2001	did not qualify							
(Japan) 2005	did not qualify							
(Japan) 2009	Round Robin	Third Place	5	3	2	9	8	Squad
(Japan) 2013	Round Robin	6th Place	5	1	4	6	12	Squad
(Japan) 2017	did not qualify							
Total	0 Titles	2/7	10	4	6	15	20	—

=== World Cup ===
Champions Runners up Third place Fourth place

World Cup record
Year	Round	Position	Pld	W	L	SW	SL	Squad
(Uruguay) 1973	did not qualify							
(Japan) 1977	did not qualify							
(Japan) 1981	did not qualify							
(Japan) 1985	did not qualify							
(Japan) 1989	did not qualify							
(Japan) 1991	did not qualify							
(Japan) 1995	did not qualify							
(Japan) 1999	did not qualify							
(Japan) 2003		10th Place	11	3	8	11	26	Squad
(Japan) 2007		9th Place	11	3	8	12	28	Squad
(Japan) 2011		8th Place	11	4	7	17	25	Squad
(Japan) 2015		7th Place	11	5	6	18	21	Squad
(Japan) 2019		7th Place	11	6	5	22	21	Squad
Total	0 Titles	5/13	55	21	34	80	121	—

=== World Grand Prix ===
Champions Runners-up Third place Fourth place

World Grand Prix record
Year	Round	Position	Pld	W	L	SW	SL	Squad
(Hong Kong) 1993	did not enter							
(China) 1994	did not enter							
(China) 1995	did not enter							
(China) 1996	did not enter							
(Japan) 1997	did not enter							
(Hong Kong) 1998	did not enter							
(China) 1999	did not enter							
(Philippines) 2000	did not enter							
(Macau) 2001	did not enter							
(Hong Kong) 2002	did not enter							
(Italy) 2003	did not enter							
(Italy) 2004		12th Place	9	1	8			Squad
(Japan) 2005		11th Place	9	1	8			Squad
(Italy) 2006		8th Place	9	2	7			Squad
(China) 2007		11th Place	9	1	8			Squad
(Japan) 2008		9th Place	9	4	5			Squad
(Japan) 2009		11th Place	9	1	8			Squad
(China) 2010		8th Place	9	1	8			Squad
(Macau) 2011		12th Place	9	3	6			Squad
(China) 2012		12th Place	9	2	7			Squad

World Grand Prix record
Year	Round	Position	Pld	W	L	SW	SL	Squad
(Japan) 2013		10th Place	9	6	3			Squad
(Japan) 2014		12th Place	9	1	8			Squad
(United States) 2015		12th Place	9	0	9			Squad
(Thailand) 2016		13th Place	8	7	1			Squad
(China) 2017		8th Place	9	4	5			Squad
Total	0 Titles	14/25	126	34	92			—

=== Nations League ===
Nations League record
Year	Round	Position	GP	MW	ML	SW	SL	Squad
(China) 2018	Preliminary round	14th	15	3	12	17	37	Squad
(China) 2019	Preliminary round	8th	15	8	7	31	33	Squad
(Italy) 2021	Preliminary round	6th	15	9	6	34	25	Squad
(Turkey) 2022	Preliminary round	9th	12	5	7	19	27	Squad
(United States) 2023	Preliminary round	11th	12	6	6	25	28	Squad
(Thailand) 2024	Preliminary round	11th	12	3	9	15	29	Squad
(Poland) 2025	Preliminary round	12th	12	5	7	20	27	Squad
(Macau) 2026	Preliminary round	15th	12	3	9	17	31	Squad
(N/A) 2027	qualified							
Total	0 Titles	9/9	105	42	63	178	237	—

=== Pan American Games ===
Champions Runners up Third place Fourth place

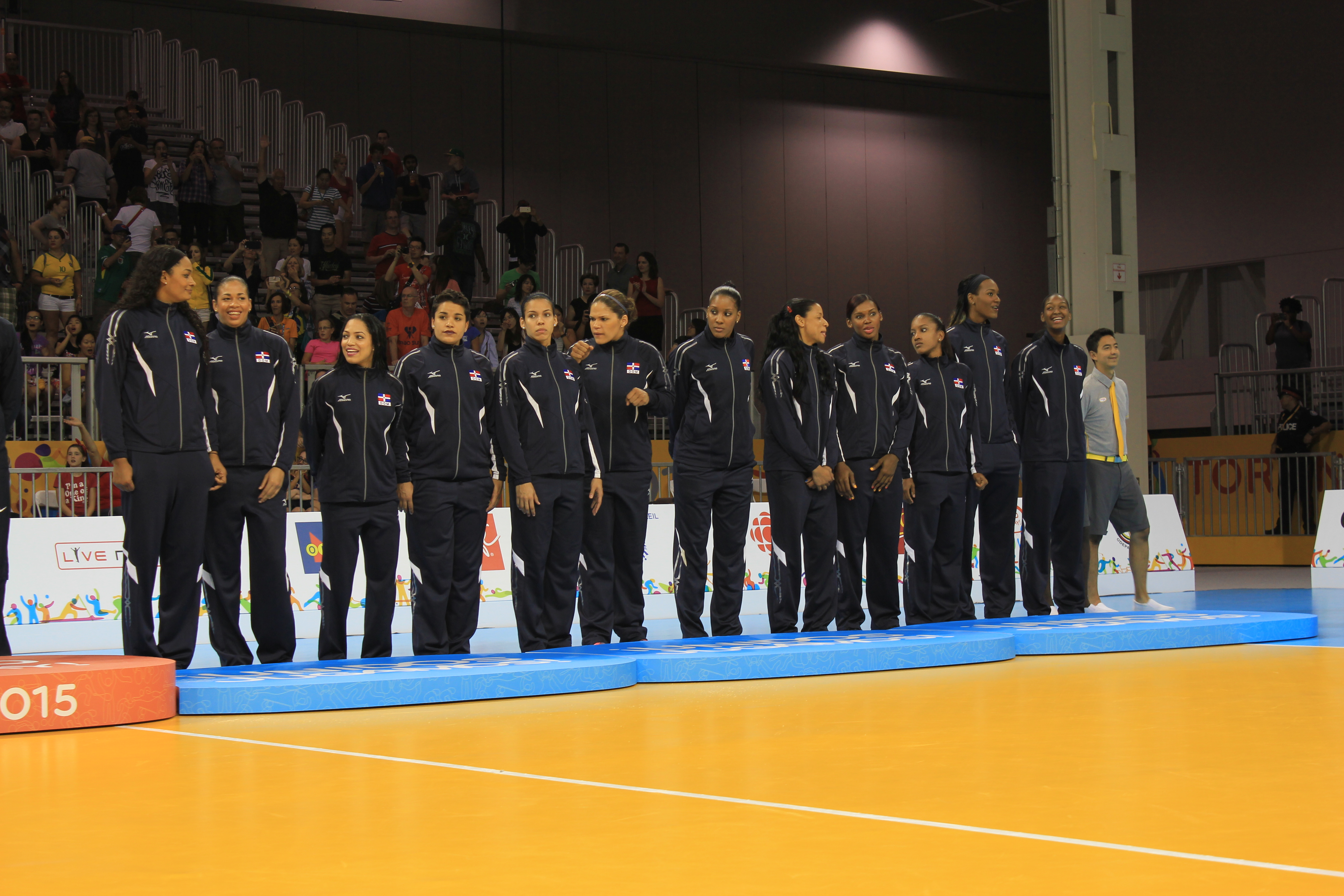
Team in Toronto 2015

Pan American Games record
Year	Round	Position	Pld	W	L	SW	SL	Squad
(Dominican Republic) 1955		4th Place						Squad
(United States) 1959	did not enter							
(Brazil) 1963	did not enter							
(Canada) 1967	did not enter							
(Colombia) 1971	did not enter							
(Mexico) 1975	did not enter							
(Puerto Rico) 1979		7th Place						Squad
(Venezuela) 1983	did not enter							
(United States) 1987	did not enter							
(Cuba) 1991	did not enter							
(Argentina) 1995	did not enter							
(Canada) 1999		4th Place						Squad

Pan American Games record
Year	Round	Position	Pld	W	L	SW	SL	Squad
(Dominican Republic) 2003		Champions						Squad
(Brazil) 2007		5th Place						Squad
(Mexico) 2011		4th Place						Squad
(Canada) 2015		3rd Place						Squad
(Peru) 2019		Champions						Squad
(Chile) 2023		Champions						Squad
Total	3 Titles	9/18						—

=== Pan American Cup ===
Champions Runners-up Third place Fourth place

Pan-American Cup record
Year	Round	Position	Pld	W	L	SW	SL	Squad
(Mexico) 2002	Final	Runners-up	4	3	1	13	3	Squad
(Mexico) 2003	Final	Runners-up	6	4	2	12	5	Squad
(Mexico) 2004	Semi-finals	Third place	6	4	2	14	9	Squad
(Dominican Republic) 2005	Final	Runners-up	7	6	1	18	9	Squad
(Puerto Rico) 2006	Semi-finals	Third place	8	6	2	20	7	Squad
(Mexico) 2007	Semi-finals	Third place	8	6	2	20	9	Squad
(Mexico) 2008	Final	Champions	7	6	1	19	8	Squad
(United States) 2009	Final	Runners-up	6	5	1	15	9	Squad
(Mexico) 2010	Final	Champions	7	6	1	20	7	Squad
(Mexico) 2011	Final	Runners-up	7	6	1	18	5	Squad
(Mexico) 2012	Semi-finals	Fourth place	8	4	4	19	13	Squad
(Peru) 2013	Final	Runners-up	5	4	1	12	4	Squad

Pan-American Cup record
Year	Round	Position	Pld	W	L	SW	SL	Squad
(Mexico) 2014	Final	Champions	7	7	0	21	4	Squad
(Peru) 2015	Final	Runners-up	7	6	1	18	8	Squad
(Dominican Republic) 2016	Final	Champions	7	7	0	21	3	Squad
(Peru) 2017	Final	Runners-up	7	6	1	19	3	Squad
(Dominican Republic) 2018	Final	Runners-up	6	4	2	14	8	Squad
(Peru) 2019	Final	Runners-up	7	6	1	18	10	Squad
(Dominican Republic) 2021	Final	Champions	7	7	0	21	0	Squad
(Mexico) 2022	Final	Champions	6	6	0	18	4	Squad
(Puerto Rico) 2023	Semi-finals	Fourth place	6	4	2	15	9	Squad
(Mexico) 2024	Semi-finals	Fourth place	8	5	3	16	14	Squad
(Mexico) 2025	Final	Champions	6	6	0	15	4	Squad
Total	7 Titles	22/22	153	124	29	396	155	—

=== NORCECA Championship ===
Champions Runners-up Third place Fourth place

NORCECA Championship record
Year	Round	Position	Pld	W	L	SW	SL	Squad
(Mexico) 1969	did not enter							
(Cuba) 1971	did not enter							
(Mexico) 1973		5th Place						Squad
(United States) 1975		5th Place						Squad
(Dominican Republic) 1977		4th Place						Squad
(Cuba) 1979		5th Place						Squad
(Mexico) 1981		5th Place						Squad
(United States) 1983		6th Place						Squad
(Dominican Republic) 1985		5th Place						Squad
(Cuba) 1987	did not enter							
(Puerto Rico) 1989		5th Place						Squad
(Canada) 1991		5th Place						Squad
(United States) 1993		6th Place						Squad
(Dominican Republic) 1995	Semi-finals	4th Place						Squad
(Puerto Rico) 1997	Semi-finals	4th Place						Squad
(Mexico) 1999	Semi-finals	4th Place	5	3	2	10	8	Squad
(Dominican Republic) 2001	Semi-finals	Third Place	4	3	1	11	4	Squad
(Dominican Republic) 2003	Semi-finals	Third Place	5	4	1	14	5	Squad
(Trinidad and Tobago) 2005	Semi-finals	Third Place	6	4	2	12	6	Squad
(Canada) 2007	Semi-finals	Third Place	6	4	2	12	8	Squad

NORCECA Championship record
Year	Round	Position	Pld	W	L	SW	SL	Squad
(Puerto Rico) 2009	Final	Champions	5	5	0	15	5	Squad
(Puerto Rico) 2011	Final	Runners Up	5	3	2	9	6	Squad
(United States) 2013	Final	Runners Up	4	3	1	10	4	Squad
(Mexico) 2015	Final	Runners Up	5	4	1	13	6	Squad
(Puerto Rico) 2019	Final	Champions	6	5	1	15	7	Squad
(Mexico) 2021	Final	Champions	6	5	1	15	7	Squad
(Canada) 2023	Final	Champions	6	5	1	15	6	Squad
(Dominican Republic) 2026	Semifinals	4th	5	3	2	9	7	Squad
Total	4 Titles	25/28					—	

== Current squad ==
Roster for the week two 2026 Nations League.

Head coach: Marcos Kwiek

No.	Name	Date of birth	Position	Height	Flag
2	Yaneirys Rodriguez Duran	June 26, 2006	Libero	5 ft 7 in (1.71 m)	(Dominican Republic)
7	Niverka Marte	October 19, 1900	Setter	5 ft 10 in (1.78 m)	(Dominican Republic)
8	Alondra Tapia	May 19, 2004	Opposite	6 ft 4 in (1.93 m)	(Dominican Republic)

== Notable players ==
Alexandra Caso; Ana Ligia Fabian; Ana Yorkira Binet; Annerys Vargas; Berenice Restituyo; Bethania Almánzar; Bethania de la Cruz; Brenda Castillo; Camil Domínguez; Cándida Arias; Carmen Rosa Caso; Cindy Rondón; Cinthia Piñeiro; Cosiri Rodríguez; Dahiana Burgos; Evelyn Carrera; Flor Colón; Francia Jackson; Gina del Rosario; Gina Mambrú; Ginnette del Rosario; Gisselinet Raposo; Grace Moya	Iris Santos; Jeoselyna Rodríguez; Juana Miguelina González; Juana Saviñón; Karla Echenique; Kenia Moreta; Lisvel Elisa Eve; Lucy Suazo; Madeline Guillén; Margarita Suero; Marifranchi Rodríguez; Milagros Cabral; Natalia Martínez; Niverka Marte; Nuris Arias; Prisilla Rivera; Rosa Medrano; Rosalín Ángeles; Sidarka Núñez; Sofía Mercedes; Winifer Fernández; Yndys Novas; Yudelka Bonilla; Yudelkys Bautista
