= Krystle Esdelle =

Trinidad and Tobago volleyball player (born 1984)

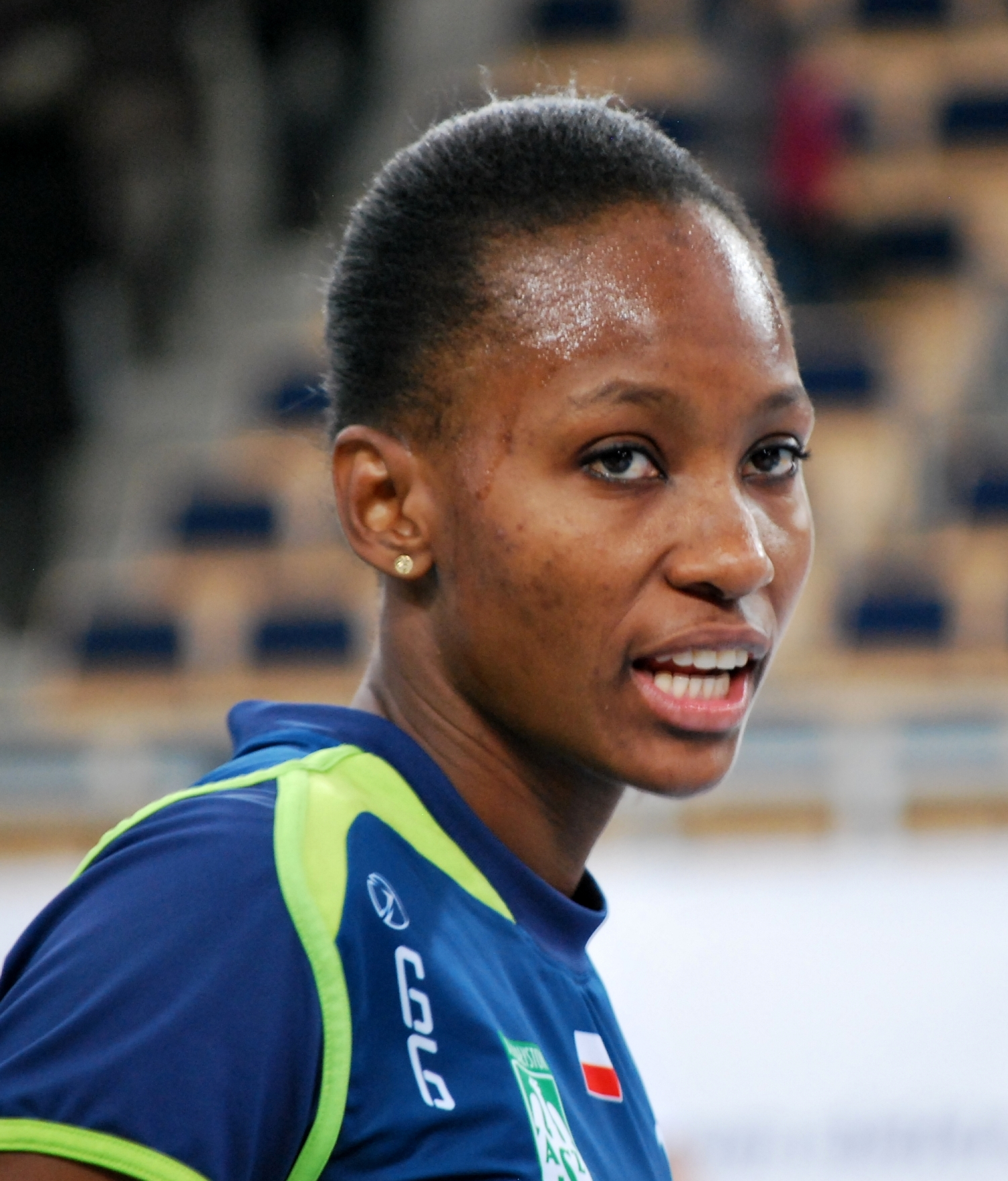
- Esdelle in 2012

Personal information
- Nationality: Trinidad and Tobago
- Born: 1 August 1984 (age 42)
- Height: 190 cm (75 in)
- Weight: 67 kg (148 lb)
- Spike: 291 cm (115 in)
- Block: 282 cm (111 in)

Volleyball information
- Position: opposite
- Number: 16 (national team)

National team
2007–2015	Trinidad and Tobago

Krystle Esdelle (born 1 August 1984) is a Trinidad and Tobago female volleyball player, playing as an opposite spiker. She is part of the Trinidad and Tobago women's national volleyball team.

She participated at the 2011 Women's Pan-American Volleyball Cup.
