= Courtnee-Mae Clifford =

Trinidad and Tobago volleyball player (born 1990)

Personal information
- Nationality: Trinidad and Tobago
- Born: 6 July 1990 (age 36)
- Height: 165 cm (65 in)
- Weight: 60 kg (132 lb)
- Spike: 280 cm (110 in)
- Block: 273 cm (107 in)

Volleyball information
- Position: libero
- Number: 10 (national team)

National team
2011	Trinidad and Tobago

Courtnee-Mae Clifford (born 6 July 1990) is a retired Trinidad and Tobago female volleyball player. She was part of the Trinidad and Tobago women's national volleyball team.

She participated at the 2011 Women's Pan-American Volleyball Cup.
