= Áurea Cruz =

Puerto Rican volleyball player

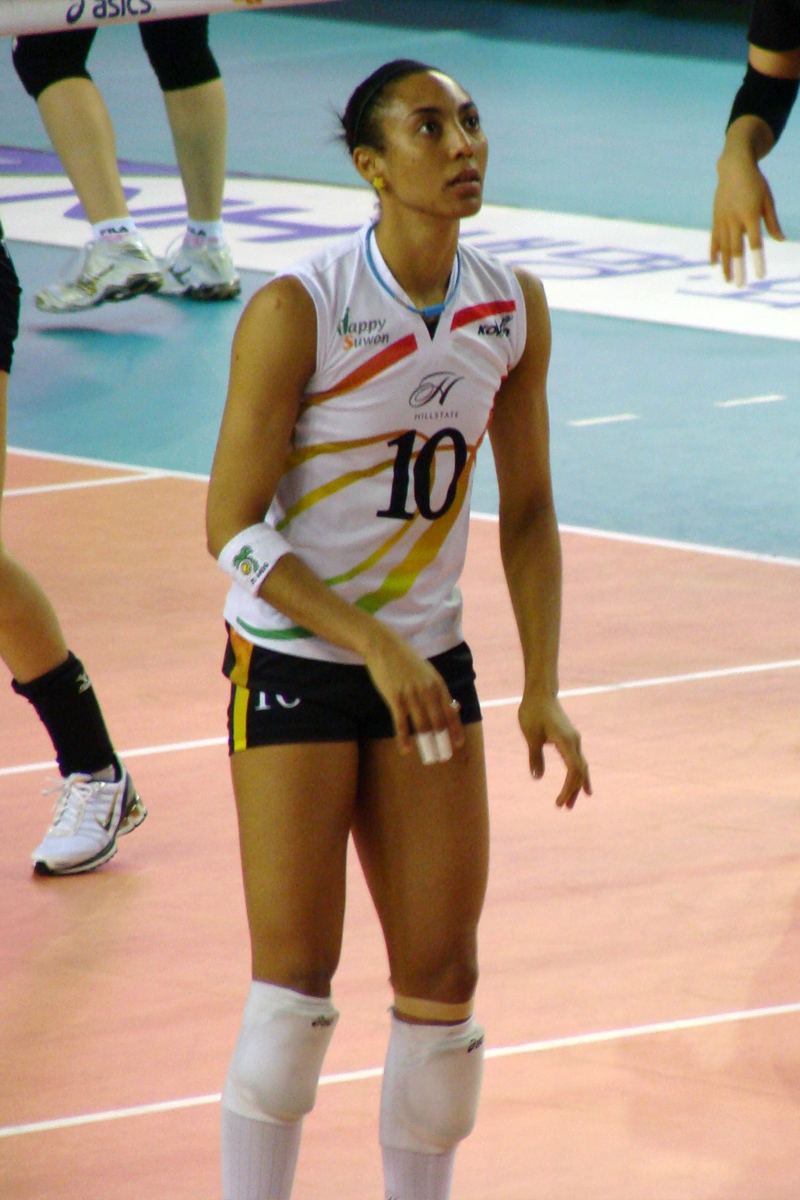

Personal information
- Full name: Áurea Esther Cruz Dalmau
- Nickname: Aury
- Nationality: Puerto Rican
- Born: January 10, 1982 (age 44); New York, New York, U.S.
- Height: 1.80 m (5 ft 11 in)
- Spike: 310 cm (122 in)
- Block: 290 cm (114 in)

Volleyball information
- Position: Outside hitter
- Current club: Orlando Valkyries

Career
| Years | Teams |
|---|---|
| 1998–1999 | Llaneras de Toa Baja |
| 2004–2005 | Llaneras de Toa Baja |
| 2005–2006 | Airone Tortolì |
| 2006–2007 | Altamura |
| 2007–2008 | Ícaro Palma |
| 2008–2009 | Hyundai Greenfox |
| 2009 | Llaneras de Toa Baja |
| 2009–2012 | MC-Carnaghi Villa Cortese |
| 2012–2015 | Rabita Baku |
| 2015–2016 | Igor Volley Novara |
| 2016-2017 | Savino Del Bene Scandicci |
| 2024- | Orlando Valkyries |

National team
| 1996–2016 | Puerto Rico |
Medal record
Women's volleyball
Representing Puerto Rico
NORCECA Championship
| Silver medal – second place | 2009 Bayamón | Team |
Central American and Caribbean Games
| Silver medal – second place | 2010 Mayagüez | Team |
| Silver medal – second place | 2014 Veracruz | Team |
| Bronze medal – third place | 2006 Cartagena | Team |
Pan-American Cup
| Bronze medal – third place | 2009 Miami | Team |

Áurea Esther "Aury" Cruz Dalmau (born January 10, 1982) is an indoor and beach volleyball player from Puerto Rico who currently plays for the Orlando Valkyries of the Pro Volleyball Federation. She is best known for competing for the Puerto Rico national team at the 2008 Olympic Qualification Tournament in Japan, where she was named Best Server at the event.

== College career ==
Cruz accepted an athletic scholarship to attend the University of Florida in Gainesville, Florida, where she competed for coach Mary Wise's Florida Gators women's volleyball team from 2000 to 2003. The Gators competed in NCAA Division I and the Southeastern Conference (SEC), and were the regular season SEC champions for four straight years during Cruz's college career. In 2003, Cruz guided the Gators to their first-ever appearance in the NCAA championship final, where they lost to the University of Southern California (USC). Following her 2003 senior season, she was nominated for Best Player in NCAA Division I. She was a three-time first-team All-SEC selection, and received AVCA first-team All-American honors three consecutive years (2001, 2002, 2003). She graduated from the university with a bachelor's degree in recreation in 2005, and was inducted into the University of Florida Athletic Hall of Fame as a "Gator Great" in 2014.

== Career ==
In 1999, Cruz received the Final Series Most Valuable Player award when her team from Puerto Rico, Llaneras de Toa Baja won the League Championship. She participated at the 2002 FIVB Volleyball Women's World Championship in Germany. Cruz won the silver medal in the 2012 FIVB Club World Championship, playing with the Azerbaijani club Rabita Baku.

Cruz's club, Rabita Baku, won the bronze medal of the 2013–14 CEV Champions League after falling 0–3 to the Russian Dinamo Kazan in the semifinals, but defeating the Turkish Eczacıbaşı VitrA Istanbul 3–0 in the third place match.

In May 2015, the Italian club Igor Novara announced the signing of Cruz for the 2015–16 season.

== Clubs ==
- (Puerto Rico) Llaneras de Toa Baja (1998–1999)
- (Puerto Rico) Llaneras de Toa Baja (2004–2005)
- (Italy) Airone Tortolì (2005–2006)
- (Italy) Altamura (2006–2007)
- (Spain) Ícaro Palma (2007–2008)
- (South Korea) Hyundai Greenfox (2008–2009)
- (Puerto Rico) Llaneras de Toa Baja (2009)
- (Italy) MC-Carnaghi Villa Cortese (2009–2012)
- (Azerbaijan) Rabita Baku (2012–2015)
- (Italy) Igor Volley Novara (2015–2016)
- (Italy) Savino Del Bene Scandicci (2016–2017)
- (United States) Orlando Valkyries (2024–)

== Awards ==
=== Individual ===
- 1999 Puerto Rican Liga de Voleibol Superior Femenino "Final Series Most Valuable Player"
- 2005 NORCECA Championship "Best receiver"
- 2006 Pan-American Cup "Best scorer"
- 2006 Pan-American Cup "Best server"
- 2006 Central American and Caribbean Games "Best receiver"
- 2006 Central American and Caribbean Games "Best scorer"
- 2006/2007 Italian A-1 League All Star
- 2007/2008 – For her excellent performance with Icaro Palma at "Copa de la Reina", she was chosen for the All-Star Team.
- 2007 Pan-American Games "Best receiver"
- 2007 NORCECA Championship "Best server"
- 2008 Olympic Qualifier "Best server"
- 2009 Pan-American Cup "Best scorer"
- 2009 NORCECA Championship "Best scorer"
- 2010 Central American and Caribbean Games "Best spiker"
- 2010/2011 Recipient of Gazzetta Trophy, awarded by the Italian sports newspaper La Gazzetta Dello Sport
- 2010/2011 Italian A-1 League "Best receiver"
- 2010/2011 Italian A-1 League "Best scorer"
- 2012/2013 Azerbaijan Super League "Best receiver"
- 2013 NORCECA Championship "Best outside hitter"
- 2013/2014 Azerbaijan Super League "MVP", "Best receiver", "Best digger"
- 2014 Central American and Caribbean Games "Best outside hitter"
- 2014/2015 Azerbaijan Super League "MVP of Finals", "Best spiker"
- 2015 NORCECA Champions Cup "Best outside spiker"

=== Club ===
- 1999 Puerto Rican League – Champion, with Llaneras de Toa Baja
- 2007/2008 Spanish Superleague – Runner-Up, with Icaro Palma
- 2009/2010 Italian League – Runner-Up, with MC-Carnaghi Villa Cortese
- 2010/2011 Italian League – Runner-Up, with MC-Carnaghi Villa Cortese
- 2011/2012 Italian League – Runner-Up, with MC-Carnaghi Villa Cortese
- 2010 Italian Cup – Champion, with MC-Carnaghi Villa Cortese
- 2011 Italian Cup – Champion, with MC-Carnaghi Villa Cortese
- 2012 FIVB Club World Championship – Runner-Up, with Rabita Baku
- 2012–13 CEV Champions League – Runner-Up, with Rabita Baku
- 2012–13 Azerbaijan Super League – Champion, with Rabita Baku
- 2013–14 CEV Champions League – Bronze medal, with Rabita Baku
- 2013–2014 Azerbaijan Super League – Champion, with Rabita Baku
- 2014–2015 Azerbaijan Super League – Champion, with Rabita Baku

== See also ==
- List of University of Florida Athletic Hall of Fame members
