= Volleyball at the 2003 Pan American Games – Women's team rosters =

This article show all participating team squads at the 2003 Pan American Games, played by eight countries held from August 1 to August 17, 2003 in Santo Domingo, Dominican Republic.

== Brazil ==
- Head Coach:

#	Name	Date of Birth	Height	Weight	Spike	Block
	Janina Conceição
	Dayse Figueiredo
	Camila Adão
	Fernanda Alves
	Fabiana Claudino
	Katia Rodrigues
	Fernanda Gritzbach
	Danielle Lins
	Mari Ellen Mendes
	Elimara Silva
	Joyce Silva
	Alessandra Sperb

== Cuba ==
- Head Coach: Luis Felipe Calderón

#	Name	Date of Birth	Height	Weight	Spike	Block
1	Yumilka Ruiz (c)	08.05.1978	179	62	329	315
2	Yanelis Santos	30.03.1986	183	71	315	312
3	Nancy Carrillo de la Paz	11.01.1986	190	74	318	315
4	Katia Guevara
5	Maisbelis Martínez	13.06.1977	182	79	322	306
8	Yaima Ortiz Charro	09.11.1981	179	70	325	313
10	Indira Mestre
11	Liana Mesa Luaces	26.12.1977	179	70	318	307
12	Azurrima Álvarez
13	Anniara Muñoz
17	Martha Sánchez
18	Zoila Barros	06.08.1976	188	76	325	312

== Dominican Republic ==
- Head Coach: Jorge Garbey

#	Name	Date of Birth	Height	Weight	Spike	Block
1	Annerys Vargas	07.08.1981	194	70	325	315
2	Rosalín Ángeles	23.07.1985	189	61	310	300
3	Yudelkys Bautista	05.12.1974	193	68	312	308
5	Evelyn Carrera	05.10.1971	182	70	301	297
6	Alexandra Caso	25.04.1987	168	59	243	241
7	Sofía Mercedes	25.05.1976	185	70	306	298
9	Nuris Arias	20.05.1973	190	78	315	306
10	Milagros Cabral	17.10.1978	181	63	308	305
12	Francia Jackson (c)	08.11.1975	168	71	280	275
14	Prisilla Rivera	29.12.1986	183	67	309	305
15	Cosiri Rodríguez	30.08.1977	191	72	313	305
16	Kenia Moreta	07.04.1981	191	76	310	305

== Peru ==
- Head Coach: Carlos Aparicio

#	Name	Date of Birth	Height	Weight	Spike	Block
	Veronica Contreras
	Milagros Moy
	Mirtha Uribe
	Leyla Chihuan
	Vanesa Palacios
	Natalia Romanova
	Kelly Culquimboz
	Andrea Ampuero
	Carla Tristan
	Natalia Malaga

== United States ==
- Head Coach: Mike Hebert

#	Name	Date of Birth	Height	Weight	Spike	Block
	Erin Aldrich
	Elisabeth Bachman
	Nicole Branagh
	Tracy Stalls
	Therese Crawford
	Sarah Drury
	Cynthia Barboza
	Lizzy Fitzgerald
	Brittany Hochevar
	Jennifer Joines
	Ogonna Nnamani
	Katie Olsovsky
