= Mercedes Pérez (volleyball) =

Cuban volleyball player (born 1950)

Personal information
- Full name: Mercedes Pérez Hernández
- Nickname: Mamita
- Born: 4 June 1950 (age 76); Havana, Cuba
- Height: 1.76 m (5 ft 9 in)

Volleyball information
- Position: Outside hitter
- Number: 1

National team
1965–1985	Cuba
Honours
Women's volleyball
Representing Cuba
World Championship
Gold medal – first place	1978 Soviet Union
FIVB World Cup
Silver medal – second place	1977 Japan
Pan American Games
Gold medal – first place	1971 Cali	Team
Gold medal – first place	1975 Mexico City	Team
Gold medal – first place	1979 Caguas	Team
Gold medal – first place	1983 Caracas	Team
Bronze medal – third place	1967 Winnipeg	Team
Central American and Caribbean Games
Gold medal – first place	1966 San Juan	Team
Gold medal – first place	1974 Santo Domingo	Team
Gold medal – first place	1978 Medellín	Team
Gold medal – first place	1982 Havana	Team
Silver medal – second place	1970 Panama City	Team

Mercedes Pérez (born 4 June 1950) is a Cuban former volleyball player and three-time Olympian. She competed with the Cuban women's national volleyball team at the 1972 Summer Olympics in Munich, the 1976 Summer Olympics in Montreal, and the 1980 Summer Olympics in Moscow.

Pérez was part of the Cuban national team that won the silver medal at the 1977 FIVB World Cup in Japan and the gold medal at the 1978 FIVB World Championship in the Soviet Union. In 1978, she was selected as the best player in the world by the FIVB.

In 1985, Pérez retired from volleyball due to the 1984 Olympic boycott and an expected 1988 Olympic boycott brought by geopolitical tensions.

== Personal life ==
In 1987, Pérez gave birth to her daughter.

== Awards ==
- Pan American Games bronze medal 1967
- Four-time Pan American Games gold medal 1971, 1975, 1979, 1983
- FIVB World Cup silver medal 1977
- FIVB best player in the world 1978
- FIVB World Championship gold medal 1978
