= Ana Díaz (volleyball) =

Cuban volleyball player

Personal information
- Full name: Ana Ibis Díaz Martínez
- Born: 17 February 1954 (age 72); Santiago de Cuba, Cuba
- Height: 1.75 m (5 ft 9 in)

Volleyball information
- Number: 3

National team
1971–1982	Cuba
Honours
Women's volleyball
Representing Cuba
World Championship
Gold medal – first place	1978 Soviet Union
FIVB World Cup
Silver medal – second place	1977 Japan
Pan American Games
Gold medal – first place	1971 Cali	Team
Gold medal – first place	1975 Mexico City	Team
Gold medal – first place	1979 Caguas	Team
Central American and Caribbean Games
Gold medal – first place	1974 Santo Domingo	Team
Gold medal – first place	1978 Medellín	Team
Gold medal – first place	1982 Havana	Team

Ana Díaz (born 17 February 1954) is a retired Cuban volleyball player and three-time Olympian. She competed with the Cuban women's national volleyball team at the 1972, the 1976, and the 1980 Summer Olympics. She won a gold medal with the Cuban team at the 1978 FIVB World Championship.

Díaz also helped the Cuban team win gold medals at the 1971, 1975, and 1979 Pan American Games.
