= Mercedes Pomares =

Cuban volleyball player (1954–2024)

Personal information
- Full name: Mercedes Pomares Primelles
- Nickname: La Zurda de Majagua, La Zurda de Oro
- Born: 9 April 1954; Majagua, Cuba
- Died: 6 August 2024 (aged 70)
- Height: 1.81 m (5 ft 11 in)

Volleyball information
- Position: Outside hitter
- Number: 4

National team
1969–1984	Cuba
Honours
Women's volleyball
Representing Cuba
World Championship
Gold medal – first place	1978 Soviet Union
FIVB World Cup
Silver medal – second place	1977 Japan
Friendship Games
Gold medal – first place	1984 Varna
Pan American Games
Gold medal – first place	1971 Cali	Team
Gold medal – first place	1975 Mexico City	Team
Gold medal – first place	1979 Caguas	Team
Gold medal – first place	1983 Caracas	Team
Central American and Caribbean Games
Gold medal – first place	1974 Santo Domingo	Team
Gold medal – first place	1978 Medellín	Team
Gold medal – first place	1982 Havana	Team

Mercedes Pomares (9 April 1954 – 6 August 2024) was a Cuban volleyball player and three-time Olympian. She competed with the Cuba national team at the 1972 Summer Olympics in Munich, the 1976 Summer Olympics in Montreal, and the 1980 Summer Olympics in Moscow. Nicknamed "La Zurda de Majagua" ("The Lefty of Majagua"), she was a left-handed striker who was the captain of the Cuban team in the late 1970s.

== Career ==
Pomares was part of the Cuba national team that won the silver medal at the 1977 FIVB World Cup in Japan and the gold medal at the 1978 FIVB World Championship in the Soviet Union. She was awarded as the "best attacker" in both tournaments.

Pomares also won gold medals with the Cuban team at the 1971, 1975, 1979, and 1983 Pan American Games.

== Personal life and death ==
Pomares enjoyed listening to the music of Bob Marley. She died on 6 August 2024, at the age of 70.
