= Maura Alfonso =

Cuban volleyball player

Personal information
- Born: 13 September 1955 (age 71); Cárdenas, Matanzas, Cuba
- Height: 1.76 m (5 ft 9 in)

Volleyball information
- Number: 8

National team
1977–1980	Cuba
Honours
Women's volleyball
Representing Cuba
World Championship
Gold medal – first place	1978 Soviet Union
FIVB World Cup
Silver medal – second place	1977 Japan
Pan American Games
Gold medal – first place	1979 Caguas	Team
Central American and Caribbean Games
Gold medal – first place	1978 Medellín	Team

Maura Alfonso (born 13 September 1955) is a retired Cuban volleyball player. She competed in the women's tournament at the 1980 Summer Olympics in Moscow. She won gold medals with the Cuban team at the 1978 FIVB World Championship in the Soviet Union and the 1979 Pan American Games in Caguas.
