= Nelly Barnet =

Cuban volleyball player (born 1951)

Personal information
- Full name: Nelly Barnet Wilson
- Born: 13 January 1951 (age 75); Camagüey, Cuba
- Height: 1.84 m (6 ft 0 in)

Volleyball information
- Number: 10

National team
1967–1978	Cuba
Honours
Women's volleyball
Representing Cuba
World Championship
Gold medal – first place	1978 Soviet Union
FIVB World Cup
Silver medal – second place	1977 Japan
Pan American Games
Gold medal – first place	1971 Cali	Team
Gold medal – first place	1975 Mexico City	Team
Bronze medal – third place	1967 Winnipeg	Team
Central American and Caribbean Games
Gold medal – first place	1974 Santo Domingo	Team
Gold medal – first place	1978 Medellín	Team
Silver medal – second place	1970 Panama City	Team

Nelly Barnet (born 13 January 1951) is a Cuban former volleyball player and three-time Olympian. She competed at the 1972 Summer Olympics in Munich, the 1976 Summer Olympics in Montreal, and the 1980 Summer Olympics in Moscow. She won a gold medal with the Cuban team at the 1978 FIVB World Championship in the Soviet Union. She was known as a clutch player who would ask for the ball late in matches when they were close.

Barnet also won a bronze medal at the 1967 Pan American Games, and a gold medal at the 1971 and 1975 Pan American Games.
