= Imilsis Téllez =

Cuban volleyball player (born 1959)

Personal information
- Full name: Imilsis Téllez Quesada
- Nickname: Matiti
- Born: 7 June 1959 (age 67); Santiago de Cuba, Cuba
- Height: 1.79 m (5 ft 10 in)

Volleyball information
- Position: Setter
- Number: 2

National team
1973–1991	Cuba
Honours
Women's volleyball
Representing Cuba
World Championship
Gold medal – first place	1978 Soviet Union
FIVB World Cup
Gold medal – first place	1989 Japan
Silver medal – second place	1977 Japan
Friendship Games
Gold medal – first place	1984 Varna
Pan American Games
Gold medal – first place	1975 Mexico City	Team
Gold medal – first place	1979 Caguas	Team
Gold medal – first place	1983 Caracas	Team
Gold medal – first place	1987 Indianapolis	Team
Central American and Caribbean Games
Gold medal – first place	1978 Medellín	Team

Imilsis Téllez (born 7 June 1959) is a Cuban former volleyball player. She competed with the Cuban women's national volleyball team at the 1976 Summer Olympics in Montreal and the 1980 Summer Olympics in Moscow. She was a setter.

Téllez helped the Cuban national team win the silver medal at the 1977 FIVB World Cup in Japan and the gold medal at the 1978 FIVB World Championship in the Soviet Union. She also won a gold medal with Cuba at the 1989 FIVB World Cup in Japan. Additionally, she won gold medals at the 1975, 1979, 1983, and 1987 Pan American Games.

In total, Téllez played over 500 international matches with the Cuban national team. She retired officially from playing in 1991, after a fourth place finish at the 1990 FIVB World Championship in China.
