= Ana María García (volleyball) =

Cuban volleyball player

Personal information
- Full name: Ana María García Crespo
- Nationality: Cuban
- Born: 6 November 1957 (age 68)
- Height: 1.77 m (5 ft 10 in)

Volleyball information
- Position: Setter
- Number: 11 (1976); 14 (1986)

National team
1976–1986	Cuba
Honours
Women's volleyball
Representing Cuba
World Championship
Gold medal – first place	1978 Soviet Union
Silver medal – second place	1986 Czechoslovakia	Team
FIVB World Cup
Silver medal – second place	1977 Japan
Friendship Games
Gold medal – first place	1984 Varna
Pan American Games
Gold medal – first place	1979 Caguas	Team
Central American and Caribbean Games
Gold medal – first place	1978 Medellín	Team
Gold medal – first place	1986 Santiago de los Caballeros	Team

Ana María García (born 6 November 1957) is a Cuban former volleyball player. García competed with the Cuban women's national volleyball team at the 1976 Summer Olympics in Montreal and the 1980 Summer Olympics in Moscow. She also helped the Cuban national team win the gold medal at the 1978 FIVB World Championship in the Soviet Union.

== Personal life ==
García married Lorenzo Martínez, who played for the Cuban men's national volleyball team and won a bronze medal at the 1976 Summer Olympics.
