= Miriam Herrera (volleyball) =

Cuban volleyball player (born 1950)

Personal information
- Full name: Miriam Herrera León
- Nationality: Cuban
- Born: 28 July 1950 (age 76)
- Height: 1.79 m (5 ft 10 in)

Volleyball information
- Number: 7

National team
1970–1978	Cuba
Honours
Women's volleyball
Representing Cuba
Pan American Games
Gold medal – first place	1971 Cali	Team
Gold medal – first place	1975 Mexico City	Team
Central American and Caribbean Games
Gold medal – first place	1974 Santo Domingo	Team
Gold medal – first place	1978 Medellín	Team
Silver medal – second place	1970 Panama City	Team

Miriam Herrera (born 28 July 1950) is a retired Cuban volleyball player and two-time Olympian. She competed at the 1972 and 1976 Summer Olympics. Herrera helped the Cuban team win gold medals at the 1971 and 1975 Pan American Games.
