= Eugenio George Lafita =

Cuban volleyball coach (1933–2014)

Personal information
- Full name: Rafael Eugenio George Lafita
- Nickname: Volleyball guru
- Born: 29 March 1933 Baracoa, Republic of Cuba
- Died: 1 June 2014 (aged 81) Havana, Cuba
- Occupation: Volleyball coach
Medal record
Head coach for Cuba women's volleyball
Olympic Games
Gold medal – first place	1992 Barcelona	Team
Gold medal – first place	1996 Atlanta	Team
Gold medal – first place	2000 Sydney	Team
Bronze medal – third place	2004 Athens	Team
World Championship
Gold medal – first place	1978 Soviet Union
Gold medal – first place	1994 Brazil
Gold medal – first place	1998 Japan
Silver medal – second place	1986 Czechoslovakia
FIVB World Cup
Gold medal – first place	1989 Japan
Gold medal – first place	1991 Japan
Gold medal – first place	1995 Japan
Gold medal – first place	1999 Japan
Silver medal – second place	1977 Japan
Silver medal – second place	1985 Japan
FIVB World Grand Prix
Gold medal – first place	1993 Hong Kong
Gold medal – first place	2000 Manila
Silver medal – second place	1994 Shanghai
Silver medal – second place	1997 Kobe
Silver medal – second place	2008 Yokohama
Bronze medal – third place	1995 Shanghai
Bronze medal – third place	1998 Hong Kong
World Grand Champions Cup
Gold medal – first place	1993 Japan
Silver medal – second place	1997 Japan
Friendship Games
Gold medal – first place	1984 Varna
Pan American Games
Gold medal – first place	1971 Cali	Team
Gold medal – first place	1975 Mexico City	Team
Gold medal – first place	1979 Caguas	Team
Gold medal – first place	1983 Caracas	Team
Gold medal – first place	1987 Indianapolis	Team
Gold medal – first place	1991 Havana	Team
Gold medal – first place	1995 Mar del Plata	Team
Gold medal – first place	2007 Rio de Janeiro	Team
Silver medal – second place	1999 Winnipeg	Team
Silver medal – second place	2003 Santo Domingo	Team

Eugenio George Lafita (29 March 1933 – 1 June 2014), also known as Eugenio George, was a Cuban volleyball coach. Nicknamed "Volleyball guru", George led the Cuban women's team to gold medals at the Olympics in 1992, 1996, and 2000. In 2000, the International Volleyball Federation (FIVB) named him the Best Women's Volleyball Team Coach of the Twentieth Century. In 2005, he was inducted into the International Volleyball Hall of Fame.

== Early life ==
George was born on 29 March 1933, in Baracoa, Cuba. He began playing volleyball in 1947 at the Pepe Barrientos Gymnasium in the Luyano neighborhood in Havana. He played on the Cuban national volleyball team for a few years, and participated in the 1955 and 1959 Pan American Games.

== Coaching ==
=== Cuban men's national team ===
George's coaching career began in 1963 with the Cuban men's junior team. He built up the foundation of the Cuban men's volleyball team that took the gold medal at the 1966 Central American and Caribbean Games in San Juan.

=== Cuban women's national team ===
In 1968, George took charge of the Cuban women's national volleyball team. Under the management of George, the Cubans clinched titles at the FIVB World Championship in the Soviet Union (1978), Brazil (1994) and Japan (1998); the FIVB World Cup in Japan (1989, 1991, 1995 and 1999); and the FIVB World Grand Prix in Quezon City (1993) and Hong Kong (2000). Most notably, he led the Cuban national team to three straight gold medal wins at the Olympics from 1992 to 2000, establishing the Cuban team as the most dominant team of the 1990s. Though he was removed as head coach shortly after the 1996 Olympics in Atlanta, he remained involved with the team as an assistant coach up to the 2008 Olympics in Beijing.

=== NORCECA ===
George was the president of the NORCECA Technical and Coaches Commission, and was a member of the FIVB Coaches Commission.

In 2009, the NORCECA Congress in Antigua, Guatemala established the "Eugenio George Lafita Trophy" to the Most Outstanding Coach of the biennial Women's Continental Championship.

== Personal life ==
For more than 40 years, George was married to Graciela González until her death in 2007.

== Death ==
George died in Havana on 1 June 2014, at the age of 81 after a fight with cancer.
