= Lucila Urgelles =

Cuban volleyball player

Lucila Urgellés

Personal information
- Full name: Lucila Urgellés Savon
- Born: 31 October 1957 (age 68); Guantánamo, Cuba
- Height: 1.83 m (6 ft 0 in)

Volleyball information
- Number: 5

National team
1976–1984	Cuba
Honours
Women's volleyball
Representing Cuba
World Championship
Gold medal – first place	1978 Soviet Union
Friendship Games
Gold medal – first place	1984 Varna
Pan American Games
Gold medal – first place	1979 Caguas	Team
Central American and Caribbean Games
Gold medal – first place	1978 Medellín	Team

Lucila Urgellés (born 31 October 1957) is a Cuban former volleyball player. She competed at the 1976 Summer Olympics in Montreal and the 1980 Summer Olympics in Moscow. She helped Cuba win gold medals at the 1978 FIVB World Championship in the Soviet Union and the 1979 Pan American Games in Caguas.
