= Sirenia Martínez =

Cuban volleyball player

Personal information
- Full name: Sirenia Martínez Lendi
- Born: 1 November 1956 (age 69); Guantánamo, Cuba

Volleyball information
- Number: 5

National team
1974–1979	Cuba
Honours
Women's volleyball
Representing Cuba
World Championship
Gold medal – first place	1978 Soviet Union
Pan American Games
Gold medal – first place	1979 Caguas	Team
Central American and Caribbean Games
Gold medal – first place	1978 Medellín	Team

Sirenia Martínez (born 1 November 1956) is a Cuban former volleyball player who won gold medals with the Cuban women's national volleyball team at the 1978 FIVB World Championship in the Soviet Union and the 1979 Pan American Games in Caguas.
