= Mavis Guilarte =

Cuban volleyball player

Personal information
- Full name: Mavis Guilarte Fernández
- Nationality: Cuban
- Born: 10 May 1951 (age 75)
- Height: 1.79 m (5 ft 10 in)

Volleyball information
- Number: 5

National team
1970–1980	Cuba
Honours
Women's volleyball
Representing Cuba
World Championship
Gold medal – first place	1978 Soviet Union
Pan American Games
Gold medal – first place	1971 Cali	Team
Gold medal – first place	1975 Mexico City	Team
Gold medal – first place	1979 Caguas	Team
Central American and Caribbean Games
Gold medal – first place	1974 Santo Domingo	Team
Silver medal – second place	1970 Panama City	Team

Mavis Guilarte (born 10 May 1951) is a Cuban former volleyball player. She competed with the Cuban women's national volleyball team at the 1972 and 1980 Summer Olympics. Guilarte won gold medals with the Cuban team at the 1978 FIVB World Championship and at the 1971, 1975, and 1979 Pan American Games.
