= Ogonna Nnamani =

American volleyball player

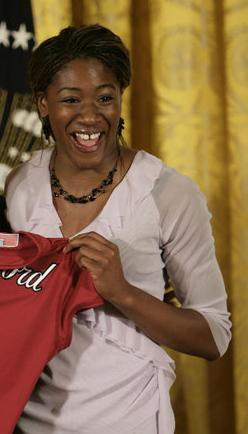
- Nnamani in 2005

Personal information
- Full name: Ogonna Nneka Nnamani
- Nationality: American
- Born: July 29, 1983 (age 43) Bloomington, Illinois, U.S.
- Education: Stanford
- Height: 6 ft 0 in (1.83 m)

Volleyball information
- Position: Outside hitter
- Current club: USA Women's National Volleyball Team
- Number: 1

Career
- Years: Team
- 2006 2006 2007 2007–08 2008–09 2009–2010: (Puerto Rico) Pinkin de Corozal (Italy) Rebecchi Piacenza (Switzerland) Voléro Zürich (Italy) Asystel Novara (Turkey) Galatasaray (Czech Republic) VK Prostějov (Switzerland) Voléro Zürich (Italy) Asystel Novara (Turkey) Galatasaray (Czech Republic) VK Prostějov

National team
- Years: Team
- 2002–2011: United States
Medal record
Women's volleyball
Representing the United States
Olympic Games
Silver medal – second place	2008 Beijing	Team
World Cup
Bronze medal – third place	2007 Japan	Team
World Grand Prix
Gold medal – first place	2010 Ningbo	Team
Bronze medal – third place	2004 Reggio Calabria	Team
Montreux Volley Masters
Silver medal – second place	2004 Montreux
Silver medal – second place	2010 Montreux
Pan American Games
Bronze medal – third place	2003 Santo Domingo	Team
Pan American Cup
Silver medal – second place	2004 Mexicali & Tijuana
Bronze medal – third place	2010 Rosarito & Tijuana
NORCECA Championship
Silver medal – second place	2007 Winnipeg

Ogonna Nneka Nnamani // (born July 29, 1983) is a physician, retired American indoor volleyball player, and former member of the United States National and Olympic teams. She was awarded the Honda-Broderick Cup in 2004 as the nation's top female athlete across all NCAA sports and is regarded as one of the best players in Stanford University's history with a career record of 2,450 kills, for which she entered the Stanford Hall of Fame in 2015.

Nnamani has played at two Olympic Games, in 2004 and 2008. In 2004, she became the second woman in history to make the U.S. national team for an Olympic Games while still in college, and as part of the second U.S. team in history to reach the Olympic finals, earned the 2008 Olympic silver medal for indoor volleyball. She led Stanford University to three NCAA championship matches, winning the national title in 2001 and 2004. Nnamani has led her professional teams to national league titles in 2007 (Swiss Volleyball League) and 2010 (Czech Extraliga), and a runner-up finish in 2006 (Puerto Rico LVSF).

== High school and personal life ==
Nnamani was born in Bloomington, Illinois, and attended University High School in Normal, Illinois, where she also played basketball. During her time at University High School she won back to back state championships in 1999 and 2000. She has a younger sister, Nji, who played volleyball alongside her at Stanford University and married professional track athlete Russell Wolf Brown. Nnamani also has two younger brothers, Nnaemeka and Ikechi Nnamani. Nnaemeka ran track and field at Illinois State University, competing in the long and triple jump. Ikechi was the 2009 Illinois High School Association champion in the high jump and former state record holder. He competed at Rice University and the University of Pennsylvania. Her parents speak the Igbo language.

Nnamani was considered the top high school recruit for her class, as she was recruited by major universities in 49 of the 50 U.S. States and won the Gatorade National Player of the Year award as a senior in high school.

She is the oldest child of Uzo and Chika Nnamani. Her parents emigrated to the United States from Nigeria in pursuit of better educational opportunities. They are alumni of Illinois State University. Her father, Chika Nnamani, is an adjunct professor in Politics and Government and also the former Assistant Vice President and Director of Housing at Illinois State University and her mother, Uzo, is an artist and a teacher.

Her last name translates to one who knows the land in the Igbo language.

In 2009 Nnamani signed a contract to play with VK Prostějov for her 2010 professional season. In the same year, she signed a contract extension with Nike.

On August 25, 2012 she married former Stanford football player, Mike Silva. Silva graduated from Stanford University with a degree in Economics. Silva also completed a master's degree in Engineering at Stanford and a master's in business administration from the Stanford Graduate School of Business. He is currently a venture capitalist. Nnamani received her Doctorate in Medicine from University of California San Francisco School of Medicine in 2020 where she was named a Regent Scholar and graduated with Alpha Omega Alpha honors. Mike and Ogonna have a daughter, Anya, and resided in San Francisco, California for 10 years. They moved to Chestnut Hill, Massachusetts, and she is currently a resident in plastic and reconstructive surgery at Harvard Medical School. She is known to be a talented orator and is a motivational speaker for organizations such as Nike, Gatorade, the Women’s Sports Foundation, Honda, and the National Football Foundation. She was a guest lecturer with Alex Rodriguez and Jeffrey K. Lee for several courses taught by Allison Kluger at the Stanford Graduate School of Business.

== Stanford University ==
=== 2001 (freshman) ===
As a freshman at Stanford, she won an NCAA Women's Volleyball Championship, and for her efforts was named on the NCAA Final Four all-tournament team as she had 19 kills against previously undefeated Long Beach State in the NCAA championship match. She was named the Pac-10, Volleyball Magazine, and AVCA Pacific Region Freshman of the Year.

=== 2002 (sophomore) ===
As a sophomore, she was named an AVCA second team all-American en route to helping Stanford to an NCAA runner-up finish, losing to Pac-10 rival USC in the final. She averaged 4.10 kills, 1.14 digs, 0.67 blocks and 4.59 points per game.

=== 2003 (junior) ===
Nnamani was named a First Team All-American as well as a Honda Sports Award nominee for volleyball. She set a Stanford single-season kills record with 627. She had 27 kills while hitting .415 in NCAA Second Round win over Pacific She was named the tournament MVP at University Park Holiday Inn Classic.

=== 2004 (senior) ===
As a senior, Nnamani won an NCAA championship, was named the AVCA National co-Player of the Year, the Honda-Broderick Cup winner, Academic All-American of the Year, and an NCAA Top Eight Award as part of the Class of 2005. Nnamani led Stanford to an unexpected NCAA championship as Stanford was not favored to win as the NCAA tournament's overall 11th seed, but Nnamani set an NCAA tournament record for kills en route to a win over number 4 seed Minnesota in the final at Long Beach Arena in Long Beach, California.

She graduated from Stanford with a degree in human biology.

== International and Olympic career ==
Nnamani is a 6 ft 1 in (185 cm) outside hitter. She joined the U.S. national team in 2002 and went to the 2004 and the 2008 Olympics. She was the youngest player on the 2004 Olympic Team and the second youngest player on the 2008 Olympic Team.

In 2005, Nnamani garnered media attention for an interview with USA Today where she remarked, "I know you can run a 100-yard dash by yourself or throw a really good pitch on your own. But in volleyball you rely on your team for every skill you perform." The quote was widely reproduced in newspapers when she was in contention for the Honda-Broderick Cup and later in September 2006 when the Italian media reported that she was being sought after by the A-1 teams.

Nnamani made her international professional debut under the Puerto Rican LVSF league for the Pinkin club of Corozal. Under Nnamani's leadership, the Pinkin team reached the finals of the national league for the first time since 1996, finishing second to the Carolina Gigantes.

After an abbreviated season in the Italian A-1 League, Nnamani signed on to Voléro Zürich of Switzerland for 2007. She joined fellow USA Olympian Robyn Ah Mow-Santos on the team. She helped Voléro Zürich team win the Swiss Cup Final, the Championship League and placed fourth in the Indesit European Championship.

After contesting the World Cup in Japan, where the United States took a bronze medal and qualified for the 2008 Beijing Olympics, Nnamani returned to Italy and joined fellow USA Olympian Lindsey Berg at Asystel Novara. Novara finished with the bronze medal in the Indesit European Championship; highlights for Nnamani included hitting at a .710 percentage on 21 swings against her former team, Volero Zurich, in the playoffs. In January 2008, she was selected by popular vote to join the "All-Star" team for an exhibition game against the Italian National Team in Turin.

At the 2008 Summer Olympics in Beijing, China, Nnamani played in both outside positions (outside hitter and opposite). Her play included a 17-point performance in a win that eliminated Poland on August 17, 2008. The United States finished with a silver medal after losing to World No. 1 Brazil, the first time it had made the gold medal match since 1984.

For the 2008–09 professional season, Nnamani played with Galatasaray, a Turkish volleyball club known for its FC (football club) that has been successful in the UEFA tournaments. Nnamani, the top scorer of her team, led Galatasaray to one of the biggest upsets in league history when the eighth-seeded Galatasaray upset first seed VakıfBank Güneş Sigorta Istanbul in the quarterfinals. The 322 points she scored during the regular season placed her fourth among all players in the Turkish Professional League.

== Collegiate awards ==
- Four time AVCA All-American (2001, 2002: 2nd team; 2003, 2004: 1st team)
- Four time First Team All-Pac-10 (2001–04)
- Four time NCAA Pacific Region Team (2001–04)
- Three time NCAA final four all-tournament team (2001, 2002, 2004)
- 2004 – Honda-Broderick Cup winner
- 2004 – Honda Sports Award volleyball winner
- 2004 – NCAA Top Eight Award
- 2004 – NCAA Women's Volleyball Championship Most Outstanding Player
- 2004 – AVCA National co-Player of the Year
- 2003 – Third-team CoSIDA Academic All-American
- 2003 – Honda Sports Award volleyball nominee
- 2003 – Second-team Pac-10 All-Academic
- 2003 – CoSIDA First-team District VIII All-Academic selection
- 2003 – Pac-10 Player of the Week (11/10)
- 2003 – University Park Holiday Inn Classic MVP
- 2002 – Third-team Verizon Academic All-American honors
- 2002 – NCAA Regional All-Tournament Team
- 2001 – NCAA Regional All-Tournament Team
- 2001 – ASICS/Volleyball Magazine National Freshman of the Year
- 2001 – Pac-10 Freshman of the Year
- 2001 – AVCA Pacific Region Freshman of the Year
- 2001 – Pac-10 First team All-Freshman
