= Jennifer Tamas =

American volleyball player

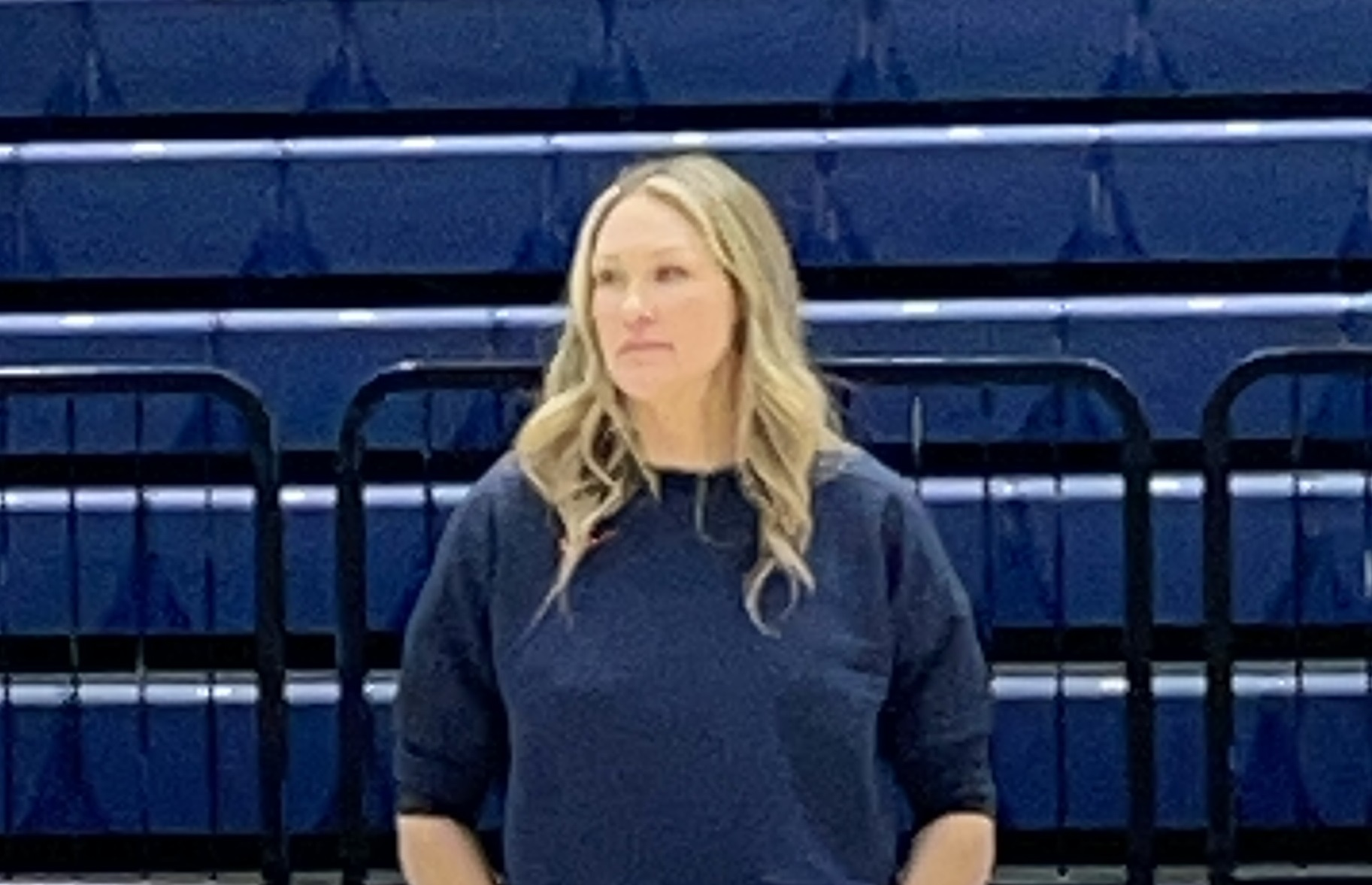
- Jen Tamas at an Illinois volleyball practice in October 2022

Personal information
- Full name: Jennifer Claire Tamas
- Born: November 23, 1982 (age 43); Santa Clara, California, U.S.
- Height: 6 ft 4 in (1.93 m)
- Spike: 124 in (315 cm)
- Block: 119 in (301 cm)

Volleyball information
- Position: Middle blocker
- Current club: Azerrail Baku
- Number: 9

Career
Years
2000–03
2004
2006–07
2007
2007–08
2008–09
2010-10
2010–11
Teams
(United States) University of the Pacific
(Puerto Rico) Pinkin de Corozal
(Italy) Chieri Volleyball
(Puerto Rico) Pinkin de Corozal
(Japan) TAB Queenseis
(Russia) Fakel Novy Urengoy
(Puerto Rico) Llaneras de Toa Baja
(Azerbaijan) Azerrail Baku

National team
| 2001–2011 | United States |
Medal record
Women's volleyball
Representing the United States
Olympic Games
| Silver medal – second place | 2008 Beijing | Team |
World Cup
| Bronze medal – third place | 2007 Japan | Team |
World Grand Prix
| Gold medal – first place | 2010 Ningbo | Team |
| Gold medal – first place | 2011 Macau | Team |
Pan American Games
| Bronze medal – third place | 2003 Santo Domingo | Team |
Pan-American Cup
| Bronze medal – third place | 2011 Ciudad Juárez |

Jennifer Claire Tamas (née Joines; born November 23, 1982) is an American indoor volleyball player. Tamas made her first Olympic appearance at the 2008 Beijing Olympics, and helped Team USA to a silver medal.

== Personal life ==
Tamas was born in Santa Clara, California, to David and Jody Joines. She has a brother, John, who also graduated from the University of Pacific and played baseball for four years as an outfielder. She lives and coaches in Illinois.

She attended Milpitas High coached by Jeff Lamb for two years and Presentation High School in San Jose, California, coached by Jim Reilly and graduated in 2000. She chose to play volleyball at the University of the Pacific in Stockton, California, where she majored in communications and business and was a member of Alpha Phi.

On August 22, 2009, she married her college sweetheart, Chris Tamas, in Paso Robles, California. Chris also played collegiate volleyball at Pacific where he was an All-American setter and holds the all-time assist record.

== University of the Pacific ==
In 2003, Tamas capped her career at University of the Pacific by being selected as an American Volleyball Coaches Association (AVCA) First-Team All-American and became the first four-time All-American in school history. She was also named the 2003 Big West Conference Player of the Year. She was named first-team All-Big West Conference for the fourth-straight season. For the season, she recorded a .340 hitting percentage with 5.63 kills, 2.09 digs and 1.20 blocks per game.

In 2002, she averaged 4.99 kills and 1.32 blocks per game and finished her junior season third in the Pacific career record book in kills (1,501) and seventh in total blocks (486). As a sophomore in 2001, she led the Tigers and Big West with 601 kills, 4.73 kills per game and a .313 hitting percentage. As a freshman in 2000, she broke 15-year-old record for single-season hitting percentage at .402 and was named the Big West Freshman of the Year and First Team All-Big West.

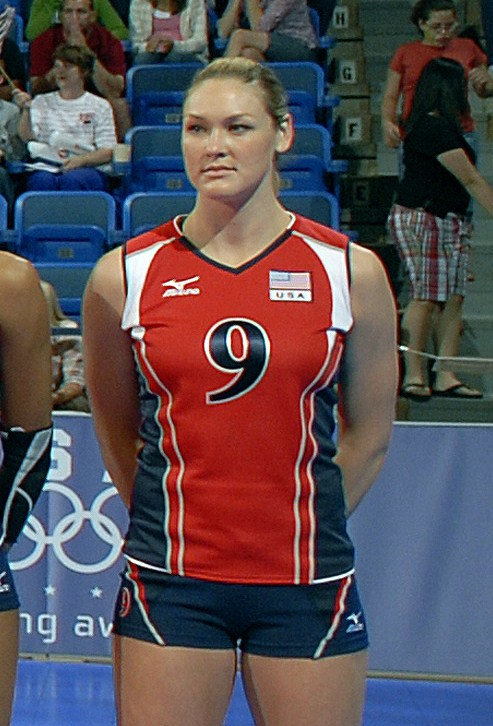

== Major international competition ==
2010

- World Championship (fourth place)

2008

- Olympic Games (silver medal)
- U.S. Olympic team exhibition vs. Brazil
- FIVB World Grand Prix *World Champions Cup

2007

- Pan American Cup (fourth place)
- FIVB World Grand Prix (eighth place)
- NORCECA Championship (silver medal)
- FIVB World Cup (bronze medal)

2006

- Pan American Cup (fourth place)
- FIVB World Grand Prix (seventh place)
- World Championships (ninth place)

2005

- Front Range Tour vs. Brazil
- Pan American Cup
- FIVB World Championship Qualifying Tournament (gold medal)
- NORCECA Continental Championships (gold medal)
- World Champions Cup

2003

- Pan American Games (bronze medal)

=== International highlights ===
2008 – Started eight of nine sets played in the opening preliminary weekend of the FIVB World Grand Prix. She averaged 3.11 points with 2.78 kills and 0.33 blocks per set and compiled a .511 hitting efficiency on 45 swings and just two errors.
2007 – Averaged 2.40 points per set during Pan American Cup and only non-libero to play in all 25 sets. She produced 15 points, including international career-high five blocks, versus Dominican Republic on June 29. She started 18 sets and three matches at the FIVB World Cup and averaged 2.11 points, 1.47 kills and 0.58 blocks per set with an overall .386 hitting percentage.
2006 – Averaged 3.33 points in 24 sets over seven matches of a tour of Italy March 22 to April 2. She scored in every match of the Pan American Cup with 10 points against Venezuela and 13 points against Argentina. She scored 61 total points at Pan American Cup. She played in 14 sets of the World Championships with eight individual set starts and compiled 24 points on 18 kills and six blocks, including a personal tournament high 10 points coming off the bench against Kazakhstan on Oct. 31.
2005 – Selected as a member of the USA Women's National Team that captured the silver medal at the season-ending FIVB World Grand Champions Cup in Japan in November, where the United States finished the tournament with a record of 4–1 as it earned wins over Korea, 2004 Olympic gold medalist China, Poland and Japan along the way.

== Professional ==
Tamas played for Toyota Auto Body Queenseis in Japan's V-League in 2008. In 2007, she played for Bigmat San Paolo Chieri of the Italian Serie A League. Produced a 2.10 points per set average and 52.6 kill efficiency for Chieri, which advanced to the league quarterfinals.
