= Idalmis Gato =

Cuban volleyball player (born 1971)

Personal information
- Full name: Idalmis Gato Moya
- Born: 30 August 1971 (age 55); Camagüey, Cuba
- Height: 1.78 m (5 ft 10 in)

Volleyball information
- Position: Outside hitter
- Number: 5 (1992–1996); 6 (2000)

National team
1991–2000	Cuba
Honours
Women's volleyball
Representing Cuba
Olympic Games
Gold medal – first place	1992 Barcelona	Team
Gold medal – first place	1996 Atlanta	Team
Gold medal – first place	2000 Sydney	Team
World Championship
Gold medal – first place	1994 Brazil	Team
FIVB World Cup
Gold medal – first place	1991 Japan
Gold medal – first place	1995 Japan	Team
World Grand Champions Cup
Gold medal – first place	1993 Japan
Silver medal – second place	1997 Japan
Pan American Games
Gold medal – first place	1991 Havana	Team
Gold medal – first place	1995 Mar del Plata	Team
Central American and Caribbean Games
Gold medal – first place	1998 Maracaibo	Team

Idalmis Gato Moya (born 30 August 1971) is a Cuban former volleyball player and three-time Olympic champion. She won gold medals with the Cuban women's national volleyball team at the 1992 Summer Olympics in Barcelona, the 1996 Summer Olympics in Atlanta, and the 2000 Olympic Games in Sydney.

Gato also won a gold medal at the 1994 FIVB World Championship in Brazil.

== Coaching ==
Gato has been coaching the Trinidad and Tobago under-18 girls team.
