= Libertad González =

Cuban volleyball player

Personal information
- Born: 24 February 1959 (age 67); Camagüey, Cuba
- Height: 1.75 m (5 ft 9 in)

Volleyball information
- Number: 10

National team
1978–1980	Cuba
Honours
Women's volleyball
Representing Cuba
World Championship
Gold medal – first place	1978 Soviet Union
Pan American Games
Gold medal – first place	1979 Caguas	Team

Libertad González (born 24 February 1959) is a Cuban former volleyball player. She was part of the Cuban women's national volleyball team at the 1980 Summer Olympics in Moscow. While playing with the Cuban team, she won a gold medal at the 1978 FIVB World Championship in the Soviet Union.
