= Rosir Calderón =

Cuban-Russian volleyball player

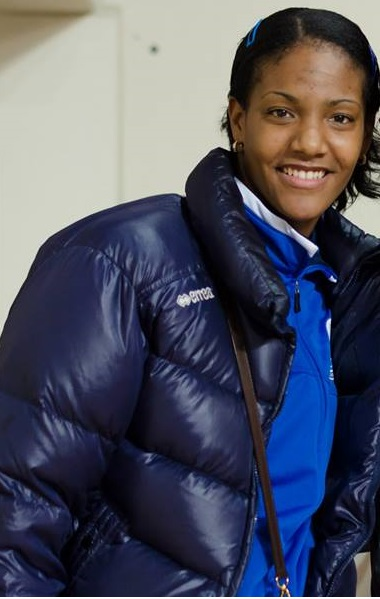
- Calderon in November, 2014

Personal information
- Full name: Rosir Calderón Díaz
- Nationality: Cuban / Russian
- Born: 28 December 1984 (age 41); Havana, Cuba
- Height: 1.91 m (6 ft 3 in)
- Weight: 70 kg (154 lb)
- Spike: 330 cm (130 in)
- Block: 325 cm (128 in)

Volleyball information
- Position: Outside hitter
- Current club: San Diego Mojo
- Number: 12

National team
2001–2009	Cuba
Honours
Women's volleyball
Representing Cuba
Olympic Games
Bronze medal – third place	2004 Athens	Team
FIVB World Grand Prix
Silver medal – second place	2008 Yokohama
NORCECA Championship
Gold medal – first place	2007 Winnipeg
Pan American Games
Gold medal – first place	2007 Rio de Janeiro	Team
Pan-American Cup
Gold medal – first place	2007 Colima
Central American and Caribbean Games
Silver medal – second place	2006 Cartagena	Team
- Last updated: May 2015

Rosir Calderón Díaz (born 28 December 1984) is a Cuban-born Russian volleyball player who was a member of the Cuban women's national team that won the bronze medal at the 2004 Summer Olympics in Athens. In November 2014, she received Russian Sport citizenship. She currently plays for the San Diego Mojo in the US Pro Volleyball Federation.

== Personal life ==
Calderón was born in Havana, Cuba, on 28 December 1984, and is the daughter of former national coach Luis Felipe Calderón and former Morenas del Caribe World Champion Erenia Díaz. She is 189 cm (6 ft 2 in) tall and weighs 74 kilograms (163 lb). She moved to Russia, getting married there. In November 2014, she received her Russian sport nationality from the FIVB, in addition to her already own civil Russian passport.

== Career ==
Calderón played the 2005 FIVB World Grand Prix helping her team to reach the fourth place and earning the Best Spiker award. She later played the 2006 FIVB qualification championship won by her national team and she was awarded Most Valuable Player and Best Spiker.

In November 2006, Calderón played the 2006 FIVB World Championship, helping Cuba to the seventh place. She posted a 59.68 average of success during the tournament to win the Best Spiker award and the US$50,000 reward.

Calderón was one of six players included by the Cuban National Federation in an agreement with their Russian counterpart led by the head coach Nikolai Karpol, who previously visited the Island in order to raise the Cuban technical level. She played with the Russian Club Uraločka NTMK for the 2005–06 season and finished that season as league's Best Scorer.

She decided to take a break from volleyball in 2009 and gave birth in February 2010, returning to the court in August 2010.

Calderón was signed by the Swiss club Voléro Zürich in a five-year contract in February 2011 and transferred on loan to Galatasaray in August 2011.

Galatasaray played the 2011–12 in the CEV Cup, making it to the finals where they faced the Italian club Yamamay Busto Arsizio, winning the first final series match 3–1, but they lost 1–3 and lost the Golden Set to end in second place.

Calderón played the 2012–13 CEV Women's Champions League with Galatasaray Daikin, finishing in fourth place after falling to Vakıfbank in the semifinals and Unendo Busto in the third place match. She won the tournament's Best Spiker award.

After being transfer on loan to the Russian Club Dinamo Krasnodar with a three-year contract, Calderón won the gold medal and the Most Valuable Player at the Basel's Top Volley International tournament.

In December 2014, Calderón won with her club the Russian Cup, after defeating Omichka Omsk. Taking the Golden Set, Calderón's Dinamo Krasnodar won the 2014–15 CEV Cup defeating the Polish club PGE Atom Trefl Sopot in Poland. Shortly afterwards, the Krasnodar club received a wild card to compete at the 2015 FIVB Club World Championship. After beating Rexona Ades Rio in the semifinals, they lost to Eczacıbaşı VitrA in the final match.

In August 2022, Calderón joined the Greek club AEK Athens.

In July 2024, Calderón signed with the San Diego Mojo of the Pro Volleyball Federation for the 2025 season.

== Clubs ==
- (Cuba) Ciudad Habana (2003–2005)
- (Russia) Uraločka NTMK (2005–2006)
- (Cuba) Ciudad Habana (2006–2009)
- (Switzerland) Voléro Zürich (2010–2011)
- (Turkey) Galatasaray Daikin (2011–2013)
- (Russia) Dinamo Krasnodar (2013–2015)
- (Turkey) Eczacıbaşı VitrA (2015–2016)
- (Japan) Ageo Medics (2016–2017)
- (France) RC Cannes (2016–2017)
- (Switzerland) Volero Zurich (2017–2018)
- (France) Volero Le Cannet (2018–2019)
- (Indonesia) Bandung Bank BJB Pakuan (2019–2020)
- (Turkey) Bolu Belediye Spor(2021–2022)
- (Greece) AEK Athens (2022–2024)
- (Greece) AONS Milon (2024)
- (Saudi Arabia) Al-Nassr VC (2024)
- (United States) San Diego Mojo (2025)

== Awards ==
=== Individuals ===
- 2005 FIVB World Grand Prix "Best spiker"
- 2005–06 Russian League "Best scorer"
- 2006 World Championship "Best spiker"
- 2007 Montreux Volley Masters "Best spiker"
- 2008 Summer Olympics "Best spiker"
- 2012–13 CEV Champions League "Best spiker"

=== Club ===
- 2011–12 Turkish Cup – Runner-up, with Galatasaray Daikin
- 2011–12 CEV Cup – Runner-up, with Galatasaray Daikin
- 2012 Turkish Volleyball Super Cup – Runner-Up, with Galatasaray Daikin
- 2012–13 Turkish Cup – Bronze Medal with Galatasaray Daikin
- 2013–14 Russian Cup – Bronze Medal with Dinamo Krasnodar
- 2014–15 Russian Cup – Champion, with Dinamo Krasnodar
- 2014–15 CEV Cup – Champion, with Dinamo Krasnodar
- 2015 FIVB Club World Championship – Runner-up, with Dinamo Krasnodar

Awards
Preceded by (Cuba) Yumilka Ruiz	Best Spiker of FIVB World Grand Prix; 2005	Succeeded by (Brazil) Fabiana Claudino
Preceded by (Russia) Elizaveta Tichtchenko	Best Spiker of FIVB World Championship; 2006	Succeeded by (Russia) Tatiana Kosheleva
