= Lafita =

Lafita is a surname. Notable people with the surname include:

- Ángel Lafita (born 1984), Spanish footballer
- Eugenio George Lafita (1933–2014), Cuban volleyball coach

== See also ==
- Lafata
