= Erenia Díaz =

Cuban volleyball player

Personal information
- Full name: Erenia Díaz Sánchez
- Nationality: Cuban
- Born: 14 April 1958 (age 68)
- Height: 1.84 m (6 ft 0 in)

Volleyball information
- Position: Middle blocker
- Number: 7

National team
1978–1982	Cuba
Honours
Women's volleyball
Representing Cuba
World Championship
Gold medal – first place	1978 Soviet Union
Pan American Games
Gold medal – first place	1979 Caguas	Team
Central American and Caribbean Games
Gold medal – first place	1982 Havana	Team

Erenia Díaz (born 14 April 1958) is a Cuban former volleyball player. She competed in the women's tournament at the 1980 Summer Olympics in Moscow. She won gold medals with the Cuban team at the 1978 FIVB World Championship in the Soviet Union and the 1979 Pan American Games in Caguas.
