= Regla Torres =

Cuban volleyball player

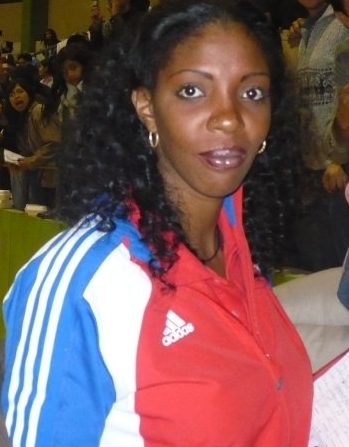
- Torres Herrera in 2009

Personal information
- Full name: Regla Radameris Torres Herrera
- Born: 12 February 1975 (age 51); Havana, Cuba
- Hometown: Havana, Cuba
- Height: 1.91 m (6 ft 3 in)
- Weight: 75 kg (165 lb)
- Spike: 331 cm (130 in)
- Block: 315 cm (124 in)

Volleyball information
- Position: Front blocker
- Number: 10

Career
Teams
	Ciudad Habana

National team
1991–2002	Cuba
Medal record
Women's volleyball
Representing Cuba
Olympic Games
Gold medal – first place	1992 Barcelona	Team
Gold medal – first place	1996 Atlanta	Team
Gold medal – first place	2000 Sydney	Team
World Championship
Gold medal – first place	1994 Brazil	Team
Gold medal – first place	1998 Japan	Team
FIVB World Cup
Gold medal – first place	1991 Japan
Gold medal – first place	1995 Japan	Team
World Grand Champions Cup
Gold medal – first place	1993 Japan
Silver medal – second place	1997 Japan
FIVB World Grand Prix
Gold medal – first place	1993 Hong Kong
Gold medal – first place	2000 Quezon City
Silver medal – second place	1994 Shanghai
Silver medal – second place	1996 Shanghai
Bronze medal – third place	1995 Shanghai
Bronze medal – third place	1998 Hong Kong
Pan American Games
Gold medal – first place	1991 Havana	Team
Gold medal – first place	1995 Mar del Plata	Team
Central American and Caribbean Games
Gold medal – first place	1998 Maracaibo	Team

Regla Torres Herrera (born 12 February 1975) is a Cuban former volleyball player who won three Olympic gold medals with the Cuban women's national volleyball team. Torres began playing on the international circuit at the age of 14. As a middle blocker, she was a key player in the dominance of the Cuban national team of the 1990s.

In 2001, Torres was the recipient of the "Best Player of the 20th Century" award by the FIVB and was inducted into the International Volleyball Hall of Fame.

== Early life ==
Torres was born in Havana, Cuba on 12 February 1975. Since she was a young girl, Torres was encouraged by teachers to play sports due to her height. Though her parents separated while she was in primary school, both were involved in her upbringing. While Torres was more interested in the high jump than volleyball, her mother insisted that she focus on the latter. In the fourth grade, Torres was sent to a sports school to develop her athletic talent. At the age of 14, she was sent to the Cerro Pelado school, where she quickly developed her volleyball skills. She then joined the national team in 1989.

== Career ==
=== Olympic Games ===
Torres won her first Olympic gold medal in 1992 in Barcelona at the age of 17. She helped her team to additional gold medals at the 1996 Olympics in Atlanta and the 2000 Olympics in Sydney, achieving the extraordinary feat of winning three Olympics in a row. She was selected as the best spiker at the Sydney Olympics.

=== Pan American Games ===
Torres helped the Cuban team to the gold medal at the 1991 Pan American Games in Havana, at the age of 16. She won another gold medal with the national team at the 1995 Pan American Games in Mar del Plata.

=== World Cups and World Championships ===
Torres helped Cuba win gold medals at the 1991 and 1995 FIVB World Cup in Japan. She also helped Cuba win the 1994 FIVB World Championship in Brazil and the 1998 FIVB World Championship in Japan, and was selected as the MVP in both tournaments.

=== World Grands Prix ===
Torres won additional gold medals with the Cuban team at the 1993 and 2000 FIVB World Grand Prix in Japan.

== Awards ==
- Three-time Olympic gold medal — 1992, 1996, 2000
- Two-time FIVB World Cup gold medal — 1991, 1995
- Two-time Pan American Games gold medal — 1991, 1995
- Two-time FIVB World Grand Prix gold medal — 1993, 2000
- Two-time FIVB World Championship gold medal — 1994, 1998
- Two-time FIVB World Championship MVP — 1994, 1998
- Olympic best spiker, MVP — Sydney 2000
- FIVB Best Player of the 20th Century — 2001
- International Volleyball Hall of Fame — 2001

Awards
Preceded by First Award	Best Server of FIVB World Grand Prix; 1993	Succeeded by (Cuba) Lilia Izquierdo
