= Sonia Lescaille =

Cuban volleyball player

Personal information
- Born: 19 March 1971 (age 55); Guantánamo, Cuba
- Height: 1.80 m (5 ft 11 in)

Volleyball information
- Position: Outside hitter
- Number: 11

National team
1991–1995	Cuba
Honours
Women's volleyball
Representing Cuba
World Championship
Gold medal – first place	1994 Brazil	Team
FIVB World Cup
Gold medal – first place	1991 Japan
World Grand Champions Cup
Gold medal – first place	1993 Japan
Pan American Games
Gold medal – first place	1991 Havana	Team
Gold medal – first place	1995 Mar del Plata	Team

Sonia Lescaille (born 19 March 1971) is a Cuban former volleyball player. She was part of the Cuban women's national volleyball team that won the gold medal at the 1994 FIVB World Championship in Brazil.

Lescaille also won gold medals with the Cuban team at the 1991 Pan American Games in Havana, Cuba and the 1995 Pan American Games in Mar del Plata, Argentina.
