= Cuba women's national volleyball team =

Women's national volleyball team representing Cuba

Cuba
- Nickname(s): The Spectacular Caribbean Girls
- Association: Federación Cubana De Voleibol
- Confederation: NORCECA
- Head coach: Tomás Fernández
- FIVB ranking: NR (2 October 2026)

Uniforms
Home	Away

Summer Olympics
- Appearances: 8 (First in 1972)
- Best result: (1992, 1996, 2000)

World Championship
- Appearances: 14 (First in 1970)
- Best result: (1978, 1994, 1998)

World Cup
- Appearances: 10 (First in 1973)
- Best result: (1989, 1991, 1995, 1999)
Honours
Olympic Games
Gold medal – first place	1992 Barcelona	Team
Gold medal – first place	1996 Atlanta	Team
Gold medal – first place	2000 Sydney	Team
Bronze medal – third place	2004 Athens	Team
World Championship
Gold medal – first place	1978 Soviet Union	Team
Gold medal – first place	1994 Brazil	Team
Gold medal – first place	1998 Japan	Team
Silver medal – second place	1986 Czechoslovakia	Team
World Cup
Gold medal – first place	1989 Japan	Team
Gold medal – first place	1991 Japan	Team
Gold medal – first place	1995 Japan	Team
Gold medal – first place	1999 Japan	Team
Silver medal – second place	1977 Japan	Team
Silver medal – second place	1985 Japan	Team
World Grand Champions Cup
Gold medal – first place	1993 Japan	Team
Silver medal – second place	1997 Japan	Team
World Grand Prix
Gold medal – first place	1993 Hong Kong	Team
Gold medal – first place	2000 Manila	Team
Silver medal – second place	1994 Shanghai	Team
Silver medal – second place	1996 Shanghai	Team
Silver medal – second place	1997 Kobe	Team
Silver medal – second place	2008 Yokohama	Team
Bronze medal – third place	1995 Shanghai	Team
Bronze medal – third place	1998 Hong Kong	Team
Pan American Games
Gold medal – first place	1971 Cali	Team
Gold medal – first place	1975 Mexico City	Team
Gold medal – first place	1979 San Juan	Team
Gold medal – first place	1983 Caracas	Team
Gold medal – first place	1987 Indianapolis	Team
Gold medal – first place	1991 Havana	Team
Gold medal – first place	1995 Mar del Plata	Team
Gold medal – first place	2007 Rio de Janeiro	Team
Silver medal – second place	1999 Winnipeg	Team
Silver medal – second place	2003 Santo Domingo	Team
Silver medal – second place	2011 Guadalajara	Team
Bronze medal – third place	1967 Winnipeg	Team
Central American and Caribbean Games
Silver medal – second place	2006 Cartagena	Team
Bronze medal – third place	2014 Veracruz	Team

The Cuba women's national volleyball team was the first team to break the domination of the USSR and Japan in the world women's volleyball by winning the 1978 World Women's Volleyball Championship.

The Cuba women's national volleyball team dominated the world in the last decade of the 20th century (1991–2000), winning eight times in a row as FIVB World Champions in straight (6th World Cup in 1991, Barcelona Olympic Games in 1992, 12th World Championship in 1994, 7th World Cup in 1995, Atlanta Olympic Games in 1996, 13th World Championship in 1998, 8th World Cup in 1999, Sydney Olympic Games in 2000).

The team's nickname was Las Espectaculares Morenas del Caribe ("The Spectacular Caribbean Girls" in English).

== Results ==
=== Olympic Games ===
Gold Silver Bronze Fourth place

Olympic Games record
Year	Round	Position	GP	MW	ML	SW	SL
(Japan) 1964	Did not qualify						
(Mexico) 1968	Did not qualify						
(West Germany) 1972	5th–8th places	6th place	5	2	3	8	10
(Canada) 1976	5th–8th places	5th place	5	3	2	12	9
(Soviet Union) 1980	5th–8th places	5th place	5	3	2	10	7
(United States) 1984	Did not participate due to boycott						
(South Korea) 1988	Did not participate due to boycott						
(Spain) 1992	Final	Gold	5	5	0	15	5
(United States) 1996	Final	Gold	8	6	2	19	9
(Australia) 2000	Final	Gold	8	7	1	23	8
(Greece) 2004	Semifinals	Bronze	8	5	3	19	16
(China) 2008	Semifinals	Fourth place	8	6	2	19	9
(United Kingdom) 2012	Did not qualify						
(Brazil) 2016	Did not qualify						
(Japan) 2020	Did not qualify						
(France) 2024	Did not qualify						
(United States) 2028	To be determined						
(Australia) 2032	To be determined						
Total	3 titles	8/18	52	37	15	125	73

=== World Championship ===
Champions Runners up Third place Fourth place

World Championship record
Year	Round	Position	GP	MW	ML	SW	SL
(Soviet Union) 1952	Did not compete						
(France) 1956	Did not compete						
(Brazil) 1960	Did not compete						
(Soviet Union) 1962	Did not compete						
(Japan) 1967	Did not compete						
(Bulgaria) 1970	Final places	8th place	9	2	7	9	25
(Mexico) 1974	7th–12th places	7th place	11	9	2	29	7
(Soviet Union) 1978	Final	Champions	9	9	0	27	2
(Peru) 1982	5th–8th places	5th place	9	8	1	24	10
(Czechoslovakia) 1986	Final	Runners-up	8	7	1	22	7
(China) 1990	Semifinals	Fourth place	7	5	2	16	7
(Brazil) 1994	Final	Champions	7	7	0	21	0
(Japan) 1998	Final	Champions	8	8	0	24	2
(Germany) 2002	5th–8th places	5th place	11	8	3	27	17
(Japan) 2006	5th–8th places	7th place	11	8	3	27	12
(Japan) 2010	9th–12th places	12th place	11	4	7	16	26
(Italy) 2014	First round	21st place	5	0	5	1	15
(Japan) 2018	First round	22nd place	5	0	5	2	15
(Netherlands) (Poland) 2022	Did not qualify						
(Thailand) 2025	Preliminary round	23rd place	3	1	2	3	7
(Canada) (United States) 2027	Qualified						
(Philippines) 2029	To be determined						
Total	3 titles	15/22	114	78	36	248	152

=== World Cup ===
- 1973 – 5th place
- 1977 – Silver Medal
- 1981 – 6th place
- 1985 – Silver Medal
- 1989 – Gold Medal
- 1991 – Gold Medal
- 1995 – Gold Medal
- 1999 – Gold Medal
- 2003 – 6th place
- 2007 – 4th place
- 2011 – did not qualify
- 2015 – 9th place
- 2019 – did not qualify
- 2023 – did not qualify

=== World Grand Prix ===
- 1993 – Gold Medal
- 1994 – Silver Medal
- 1995 – Bronze Medal
- 1996 – Silver Medal
- 1997 – Silver Medal
- 1998 – Bronze Medal
- 1999 – 5th place
- 2000 – Gold Medal
- 2001 – 4th place
- 2002 – 7th place
- 2003 – 11th place
- 2004 – 4th place
- 2005 – 4th place
- 2006 – 4th place
- 2007 – 7th place
- 2008 – Silver Medal
- 2009 – did not participate
- 2010 – did not participate
- 2011 – 11th place
- 2012 – 6th place
- 2013 – 19th place
- 2014 – 20th place
- 2015 – 25th place
- 2016 – 25th place

=== FIVB World Grand Champions Cup ===
- 1993 – Gold Medal
- 1997 – Silver Medal

=== Pan American Games ===
- 1955 – did not participate
- 1959 – did not participate
- 1963 – did not participate
- 1967 – Bronze Medal
- 1971 – Gold Medal
- 1975 – Gold Medal
- 1979 – Gold Medal
- 1983 – Gold Medal
- 1987 – Gold Medal
- 1991 – Gold Medal
- 1995 – Gold Medal
- 1999 – Silver Medal
- 2003 – Silver Medal
- 2007 – Gold Medal
- 2011 – Silver Medal
- 2015 – 5th place

=== Pan-American Cup ===
- 2002 – Gold Medal
- 2003 – Bronze Medal
- 2004 – Gold Medal
- 2005 – Gold Medal
- 2006 – Silver Medal
- 2007 – Gold Medal
- 2008 – 11th place
- 2009 – did not participate
- 2010 – 4th place
- 2011 – 4th place
- 2012 – Bronze Medal
- 2013 – 6th place
- 2014 – 5th place
- 2015 – 4th place
- 2016 – 4th place
- 2017 – 5th place
- 2018 – 7th place
- 2019 – 8th place
- 2020 – 5th place
- 2021 – 5th place

=== Final Four Cup ===
- 2008 – 4th place
- 2009 – did not participate
- 2010 – did not participate

== Current squad ==
The following is the Cuban roster in the 2018 World Championship.

Head coach: Tomás Fernández

No.	Name	Date of birth	Height	Weight	Spike	Block	2019–20 club
1	Claudia Hernández Aguila	9 January 1997	1.82 m (6 ft 0 in)	78 kg (172 lb)	225 cm (89 in)	223 cm (88 in)	(France) Volley-Ball Club Chamalières
4	Lianny Tamayo Canton	30 April 1999	1.81 m (5 ft 11 in)	58 kg (128 lb)	295 cm (116 in)	290 cm (110 in)	(Spain) CV Emeve
7	Evilania Martínez Luis	11 January 2000	1.86 m (6 ft 1 in)	71 kg (157 lb)	305 cm (120 in)	300 cm (120 in)	(Cuba) Camagüey
8	Diaris Pérez (c)	16 November 1998	1.83 m (6 ft 0 in)	75 kg (165 lb)	304 cm (120 in)	295 cm (116 in)	(France) Volley-Ball Club Chamalières
11	Gretell Elena Moreno Borrero	30 January 1998	1.84 m (6 ft 0 in)	68 kg (150 lb)	287 cm (113 in)	280 cm (110 in)	(Czech Republic) VK Královo Pole Brno
12	Ailama Cesé Montalvo	29 October 2000	1.90 m (6 ft 3 in)	58 kg (128 lb)	322 cm (127 in)	308 cm (121 in)	(Russia) Uralochka-NTMK
14	Jessica Aguilera Carbajal	25 May 1999	1.86 m (6 ft 1 in)	68 kg (150 lb)	311 cm (122 in)	302 cm (119 in)	(France) Volley-Ball Club Chamalières
13	Yamileidys Viltres	26 July 2001	1.90 m (6 ft 3 in)	77 kg (170 lb)	308 cm (121 in)	295 cm (116 in)	(Russia) Uralochka-URGEU
19	Laura Beatriz Suárez Hernández	13 December 1998	1.88 m (6 ft 2 in)	75 kg (165 lb)	304 cm (120 in)	292 cm (115 in)	(Peru) Deportivo Jaamsa
22	Egli Sabin Terry	25 November 1991	1.87 m (6 ft 2 in)	76 kg (168 lb)	315 cm (124 in)	308 cm (121 in)	(Serbia) Leskovac 98
23	Daima del Río Preval	9 September 2000	1.85 m (6 ft 1 in)	77 kg (170 lb)	326 cm (128 in)	324 cm (128 in)	(Hungary) UTE Budapest
25	Ivy May Vila Wittingham	22 July 2001	1.82 m (6 ft 0 in)	78 kg (172 lb)	325 cm (128 in)	322 cm (127 in)	(Cuba) Camagüey

== Former squads ==
- 1976 Olympic Games – 5th place
  Nelly Barnet, Evelina Borroto, Ana Díaz, Ana María García, Miriam Herrera, Mercedes Pérez, Mercedes Pomares, Mercedes Roca, Melanea Tartabull, Imilsis Téllez, Lucila Urgelles and Claudina Villaurrutia. Head coach: Eugenio George Lafita.
- 1978 World Championship – Gold medal
  Nelly Barnet, Ana Díaz, Erenia Díaz, Ana María García, Mavis Guilarte, Libertad González, Sirenia Martínez, Mercedes Pérez, Mercedes Pomares, Imilsis Téllez and Lucila Urgelles. Head coach: Eugenio George Lafita.
- 1980 Olympic Games – 5th place
  Maura Alfonso, Nelly Barnet, Ana Díaz, Erenia Díaz, Josefina Capote, Ana María García, Libertad Gonzalez, Mavis Guilarte, Mercedes Pérez, Mercedes Pomares, Imilsis Téllez and Lucila Urgelles. Head coach: Eugenio George Lafita.
- 1992 Olympic Games – Gold medal
  Regla Bell, Mercedes Calderón, Magalys Carvajal, Marlenys Costa, Ana Fernández, Idalmis Gato, Lilia Izquierdo, Norka Latamblet, Mireya Luis, Raisa O'Farril, Tania Ortiz and Regla Torres. Head coach: Eugenio George Lafita.
- 1994 World Championship – Gold medal
  Regla Bell, Mercedes Calderón, Magalys Carvajal, Marlenys Costa, Ana Fernández, Mirka Francia, Idalmis Gato, Mireya Luis Hernández, Lilia Izquierdo, Sonia Lescaille, Tania Ortíz and Regla Torres. Head coach: Eugenio George Lafita.
- 1996 Olympic Games – Gold medal
  Taismary Agüero, Regla Bell, Magalys Carvajal, Marlenys Costa, Ana Fernández, Mirka Francia, Idalmis Gato, Lilia Izquierdo, Mireya Luis, Raisa O'Farril, Yumilka Ruíz and Regla Torres. Head coach: Eugenio George Lafita.
- 1998 World Championship – Gold medal
  Taismary Agüero, Regla Bell, Marlenys Costa, Mirka Francia, Mireya Luis, Lilia Izquierdo, Liana Mesa, Indira Mestre, Yumilka Ruíz, Martha Sánchez, Regla Torres and Ana Fernández. Head coach: Antonio Perdomo.
- 1999 FIVB World Cup – Gold medal
  Taismary Agüero, Azurima Álvarez, Regla Bell, Marlenys Costa, Mirka Francia, Lilia Izquierdo, Enia Martínez, Liana Mesa, Yoselín Roque Palacios, Yumilka Ruíz, Martha Sánchez and Ana Fernández. Head coach: Antonio Perdomo.
- 2000 Olympic Games – Gold medal
  Taismary Agüero, Zoila Barros, Regla Bell, Marlenys Costa, Ana Fernández, Mirka Francia, Idalmis Gato, Lilia Izquierdo, Mireya Luis, Yumilka Ruíz, Martha Sánchez and Regla Torres. Head coach: Luis Felipe Calderón
- 2001 FIVB World Grand Prix – 4th place
  Zoila Barros, Ana Fernández, Maisbelis Martínez, Misleidis Martínez, Liana Mesa, Indira Mestre, Anniara Muñoz, Yoslan Muñoz, Yaima Ortiz, Yumilka Ruíz, Martha Sánchez and Regla Torres. Head coach: Luis Felipe Calderón.
- 2002 World Championship – 5th place
  Zoila Barros, Rosir Calderón, Nancy Carrillo, Liana Mesa, Indira Mestre, Anniara Muñoz, Yoslan Muñoz, Yaima Ortiz, Yumilka Ruíz, Martha Sánchez, Yanelis Santos and Regla Torres. Head coach: Luis Felipe Calderón.
- 2003 FIVB World Cup – 6th place
  Zoila Barros, Rosir Calderón, Nancy Carrillo, Maisbelis Martínez, Liana Mesa, Anniara Muñoz, Yaima Ortiz, Daimí Ramírez, Yumilka Ruíz, Martha Sánchez, Yanelis Santos and Dulce Téllez. Head coach: Luis Felipe Calderón.
- 2004 Olympic Games – Bronze medal
  Zoila Barros, Rosir Calderón, Nancy Carrillo, Ana Fernández, Maisbelis Martínez, Liana Mesa, Anniara Muñoz, Yaima Ortíz, Daimí Ramírez, Yumilka Ruíz, Marta Sánchez and María Téllez. Head coach: Luis Felipe Calderón.
- 2005 FIVB World Grand Prix – 4th place
  Zoila Barros, Rosir Calderón, Nancy Carrillo, Kenia Carcaces, Maisbelis Martínez, Liana Mesa, Yaima Ortíz, Daimí Ramírez, Yumilka Ruíz, Rachel Sánchez and Yanelis Santos. Head coach: Luis Felipe Calderón.
- 2006 World Championship – 7th place
  Lisbet Arredondo, Zoila Barros, Rosir Calderón, Kenia Carcaces, Nancy Carrillo, Yenisey Gonzalez, Liana Mesa, Yaima Ortíz, Daimí Ramírez, Yumilka Ruíz (c), Rachel Sánchez and Yanelis Santos. Head coach: Eugenio George Lafita.
- 2007 NORCECA Championship – Gold medal
  Zoila Barros, Rosir Calderón, Nancy Carrillo, Kenia Carcaces, Yenisey González, Yusleidys Hernández, Yaima Ortíz, Daimí Ramírez, Yumilka Ruíz (c), Yanelis Santos, Yusidey Silié and Gyselle Silva. Head coach: Antonio Perdomo.
- 2007 FIVB World Cup – 4th place
  Zoila Barros, Rosir Calderón, Kenia Carcaces, Nancy Carrillo, Yenisei González, Yusleidys Herera, Yaima Ortiz, Daimí Ramírez, Yumilka Ruíz (c), Dominica Salmon, Rachel Sánchez, Yanelis Santos and Yusidey Silié. Head coach: Antonio Perdomo.
- 2011 Pan-American Games – Silver medal
  Emily Borrell, Kenia Carcaces, Liannes Castañeda, Ana Yilian Cleger, Rosanna Giel, Daymara Lescay, Yoana Palacios, Alena Rojas, Wilma Salas, Yanelis Santos, Yusidey Silie (c) and Gyselle Silva. Head coach: Juan Carlos Gala.

== See also ==
- Cuba women's national under-23 volleyball team
- Cuba women's national under-20 volleyball team
- Cuba women's national under-18 volleyball team
