= Katia Rodrigues =

Brazilian volleyball player (born 1979)

Personal information
- Full name: Kátia Maria Rodrigues de Oliveira
- Born: 17 May 1979 (age 47); Piracicaba, São Paulo, Brazil
- Height: 1.82 m (6 ft 0 in)
- Weight: 64 kg (141 lb)
- Spike: 304 cm (120 in)
- Block: 290 cm (114 in)

Volleyball information
- Position: Middle blocker
- Current club: Retired

National team
2005	Brazil
Honours
Women's volleyball
Representing Brazil
World Grand Prix
Gold medal – first place	2005 Sendai	Team

Katia Rodrigues (born 17 May 1979) is a Brazilian female volleyball player.

She was part of the Brazil women's national volleyball team at the 2003 Pan American Games, and the 2005 FIVB World Grand Prix.

== Clubs ==
- Rexona Ades (2005)
