= Indira Mestre =

Cuban volleyball player

Personal information
- Full name: Indira Mestre Baro
- Nationality: Cuban
- Born: 21 April 1979 (age 47)
- Height: 1.81 m (5 ft 11 in)
- Spike: 332 cm (131 in)
- Block: 329 cm (130 in)

Volleyball information
- Position: Middle blocker
- Number: 9

National team
1997–2005	Cuba
Honours
Women's volleyball
Representing Cuba
World Championship
Gold medal – first place	1998 Japan	Team
FIVB World Grand Prix
Bronze medal – third place	1998 Hong Kong
World Grand Champions Cup
Silver medal – second place	1997 Japan
Pan American Games
Silver medal – second place	1999 Winnipeg	Team
Silver medal – second place	2003 Santo Domingo	Team

Indira Mestre (born 21 April 1979) is a Cuban former volleyball player. Mestre was part of the Cuban women's national volleyball team at the 1998 FIVB World Championship in Japan, where she won a gold medal, and also at the 2002 FIVB World Championship in Germany.
