= Yasser Portuondo =

Cuban volleyball player (born 1983)

Yasser Portuando
Personal information
- Nationality: Cuban
- Born: 2 February 1983 (age 43)
- Height: 196 cm (6 ft 5 in)
- Weight: 90 kg (198 lb)
- Spike: 351 cm (138 in)
- Block: 319 cm (126 in)

Volleyball information
- Number: 4 (national team)

Career
- Years: Team
- 2004: Santigao de Cuba, CUB

National team
- Years: Team
- 2003–2007: Cuba
Honours
Men's volleyball
Representing Cuba
Pan American Games
Silver medal – second place	2003 San Domingo	Team

Yasser Portuondo (born February 2, 1983) is a male volleyball player from Cuba. He was a member of the Men's National Team that claimed the silver at the 2003 Pan American Games after losing to Venezuela in the final. There he was named Best Receiver of the tournament.
