= 1991 FIVB Volleyball Women's World Cup =

Volleyball competition held in Japan

1991 Women's World Cup
Tournament details
- Host country: Japan
- Dates: 8–17 November
- Teams: 12
- Venue: (in 3 host cities)

Final positions
- Champions: Cuba (2nd title)

Tournament awards
- MVP: (United States) Caren Kemner

The 1991 FIVB Women's World Cup was held from 8 to 17 November 1991 in 3 cities in Japan: Tokyo, Sendai, and Osaka. Twelve national teams played for the right to a fast lane ticket into the 1992 Summer Olympics in Barcelona, Spain.

== Teams ==
Group A	Group B
Soviet Union	Brazil
Canada	China
South Korea	Cuba
Japan	Germany
Peru	United States
Spain	Kenya

== Results ==
=== First round ===
==== Pool A ====
Pos	Team	Pld	W	L	Pts	SW	SL	SR	SPW	SPL	SPR	Qualification
1	Soviet Union	5	5	0	10	15	5	3.000	293	215	1.363	Final places
2	Peru	5	3	2	8	12	8	1.500	278	235	1.183	Final places
3	South Korea	5	3	2	8	13	9	1.444	288	249	1.157	Final places
4	Japan	5	3	2	8	12	9	1.333	276	234	1.179	7th–12th places
5	Canada	5	1	4	6	6	13	0.462	207	260	0.796	7th–12th places
6	Spain	5	0	5	5	1	15	0.067	90	239	0.377	7th–12th places

Location: Tokyo

Date		Score		Set 1	Set 2	Set 3	Set 4	Set 5	Total
8 Nov	Soviet Union	3–0	Spain	15–1	15–10	15–2			45–13
8 Nov	Peru	3–2	South Korea	15–2	12–15	17–15	13–15	17–16	74–63
8 Nov	Japan	3–1	Canada	15–10	15–8	11–15	15–5		56–38
9 Nov	Soviet Union	3–1	Peru	14–16	17–15	15–7	15–11		61–49
9 Nov	South Korea	3–1	Canada	12–15	15–3	15–5	15–10		57–33
9 Nov	Japan	3–0	Spain	15–2	15–5	15–4			45–11
10 Nov	Peru	3–0	Canada	15–10	15–6	15–13			45–29
10 Nov	South Korea	3–0	Spain	15–5	15–3	15–2			45–10
10 Nov	Soviet Union	3–1	Japan	11–15	15–10	15–10	15–11		56–46

Location: Gifu

Date		Score		Set 1	Set 2	Set 3	Set 4	Set 5	Total
12 Nov	Soviet Union	3–2	South Korea	11–15	15–13	15–7	14–16	15–8	70–59
12 Nov	Canada	3–1	Spain	15–12	14–16	15–2	15–11		59–41
12 Nov	Japan	3–2	Peru	15–13	10–15	10–15	15–7	17–15	67–65
13 Nov	Soviet Union	3–1	Canada	16–14	15–12	15–17	15–5		61–48
13 Nov	Peru	3–0	Spain	15–3	15–11	15–1			45–15
13 Nov	South Korea	3–2	Japan	6–15	15–11	15–6	11–15	17–15	64–62

==== Pool B ====
Pos	Team	Pld	W	L	Pts	SW	SL	SR	SPW	SPL	SPR	Qualification
1	Cuba	5	5	0	10	15	3	5.000	252	174	1.448	Final places
2	China	5	4	1	9	12	4	3.000	228	153	1.490	Final places
3	United States	5	3	2	8	11	8	1.375	245	204	1.201	Final places
4	Brazil	5	2	3	7	10	9	1.111	250	210	1.190	7th–12th places
5	Germany	5	1	4	6	3	12	0.250	146	197	0.741	7th–12th places
6	Kenya	5	0	5	5	0	15	0.000	42	225	0.187	7th–12th places

Location: Sendai

Date		Score		Set 1	Set 2	Set 3	Set 4	Set 5	Total
8 Nov	United States	3–2	Brazil	17–15	8–15	15–11	7–15	15–9	62–65
8 Nov	China	3–0	Germany	15–6	15–6	15–10			45–22
8 Nov	Cuba	3–0	Kenya	15–3	15–5	15–2			45–10
9 Nov	Cuba	3–0	China	15–7	15–13	16–14			46–34
9 Nov	Brazil	3–0	Germany	15–13	15–6	15–13			45–32
9 Nov	United States	3–0	Kenya	15–4	15–2	15–1			45–7
10 Nov	Germany	3–0	Kenya	15–3	15–9	15–5			45–17
10 Nov	China	3–0	Brazil	15–11	15–11	15–6			45–28
10 Nov	Cuba	3–1	United States	4–15	15–11	15–7	15–7		49–40

Location: Kyoto

Date		Score		Set 1	Set 2	Set 3	Set 4	Set 5	Total
12 Nov	China	3–1	United States	13–15	15–12	16–14	15–12		59–53
12 Nov	Brazil	3–0	Kenya	15–4	15–0	15–0			45–4
12 Nov	Cuba	3–0	Germany	15–6	15–9	15–8			45–23
13 Nov	Cuba	3–2	Brazil	17–15	16–17	4–15	15–11	15–9	67–67
13 Nov	China	3–0	Kenya	15–2	15–0	15–2			45–4
13 Nov	United States	3–0	Germany	15–8	15–8	15–8			45–24

=== Final round ===
The results and the points of the matches between the same teams that were already played during the first round are taken into account for the final round.

==== 7th–12th places ====
Pos	Team	Pld	W	L	Pts	SW	SL	SR	SPW	SPL	SPR
7	Japan	5	5	0	10	15	4	3.750	267	166	1.608
8	Brazil	5	4	1	9	13	3	4.333	223	123	1.813
9	Germany	5	3	2	8	11	7	1.571	239	204	1.172
10	Canada	5	2	3	7	8	10	0.800	210	199	1.055
11	Spain	5	1	4	6	4	12	0.333	137	213	0.643
12	Kenya	5	0	5	5	0	15	0.000	54	225	0.240

Date		Score		Set 1	Set 2	Set 3	Set 4	Set 5	Total
15 Nov	Japan	3–0	Kenya	15–2	15–4	15–2			45–8
15 Nov	Brazil	3–0	Spain	15–6	15–4	15–2			45–12
15 Nov	Germany	3–1	Canada	15–11	15–12	6–15	15–7		51–45
16 Nov	Japan	3–2	Germany	15–12	10–15	12–15	17–16	15–8	69–66
16 Nov	Brazil	3–0	Canada	15–5	15–6	15–12			45–23
16 Nov	Spain	3–0	Kenya	15–1	15–5	15–13			45–19
17 Nov	Japan	3–1	Brazil	15–11	7–15	15–10	15–7		52–43
17 Nov	Germany	3–0	Spain	15–8	15–8	15–12			45–28
17 Nov	Canada	3–0	Kenya	15–3	15–3	15–0			45–6

==== Final places ====
Location: Osaka

Pos	Team	Pld	W	L	Pts	SW	SL	SR	SPW	SPL	SPR
1	Cuba	5	4	1	9	12	5	2.400	221	195	1.133
2	China	5	4	1	9	12	6	2.000	239	194	1.232
3	Soviet Union	5	4	1	9	13	8	1.625	270	239	1.130
4	United States	5	2	3	7	10	11	0.909	248	252	0.984
5	Peru	5	1	4	6	8	14	0.571	269	285	0.944
6	South Korea	5	0	5	5	4	15	0.267	197	279	0.706

Date		Score		Set 1	Set 2	Set 3	Set 4	Set 5	Total
15 Nov	China	3–1	Peru	15–4	15–11	6–15	15–11		51–41
15 Nov	Soviet Union	3–2	United States	15–6	8–15	7–15	15–3	15–8	60–47
15 Nov	Cuba	3–0	South Korea	15–7	15–8	15–12			45–27
16 Nov	United States	3–0	South Korea	15–10	15–6	15–10			45–26
16 Nov	China	3–1	Soviet Union	15–3	5–15	15–7	15–7		50–32
16 Nov	Cuba	3–1	Peru	15–9	15–12	2–15	15–11		47–47
17 Nov	China	3–0	South Korea	15–7	15–11	15–4			45–22
17 Nov	United States	3–2	Peru	7–15	15–11	15–5	11–15	15–12	63–58
17 Nov	Soviet Union	3–0	Cuba	15–11	17–15	15–8			47–34

== Final standing ==
Rank	Team
1st place, gold medalist(s)	Cuba
2nd place, silver medalist(s)	China
3rd place, bronze medalist(s)	Soviet Union
4	United States
5	Peru
6	South Korea
7	Japan
8	Brazil
9	Germany
10	Canada
11	Spain
12	Kenya

1991 Women's World Cup champions

Cuba
2nd title

Team roster
Mireya Luis, Sonia Lescaille, Inés Saavedra, Lilia Izquierdo, Tania Ortiz, Mercedes Calderón, Regla Torres, Magaly Carvajal, Regla Bell, Marlenis Costa, Idalmis Gato, Norka Latamblet
Head coach
Eugenio George Lafita

== Awards ==
- Most valuable player
  (United States) Caren Kemner
- Best scorer
  (United States) Caren Kemner
- Best attacker
  (Cuba) Mireya Luis
- Best blocker
  (Peru) Gabriela Pérez del Solar
- Best setter
  (China) Ma Fang
- Best server
  (Cuba) Mercedes Calderón
- Best defender
  (South Korea) Chang Yoon-hee
- Best coach
  (Cuba) Eugenio George Lafita
- Spirit of Fight
  (Cuba) Mireya Luis

== Statistics leaders ==
Best scorers

Rank	Name	Points
1	(United States) KEMNER	116
2	(Soviet Union) SMIRNOVA	112
3	(Cuba) LUIS	106
4	(Brazil) MOSER	104
5	(Cuba) CARVAJAL	97
6	(China) WU Dan	94
7	(Soviet Union) OGUIENKO	93
8	(Peru) PEREZ Del Solar	90
9	(Cuba) CALDERON	89
10	(Japan) OBAYASHI	86

Best spikers

Rank	Name	%Eff
1	(Cuba) LUIS	45.23
2	(Brazil) KEMNER	37.45
3	(China) WU Dan	35.21
4	(Peru) PEREZ Del Solar	34.11
5	(Soviet Union) CHEBUKINA	31.31

Best blockers

Rank	Name	Avg
1	(Peru) PEREZ Del Solar	1.45
2	(Cuba) CARVAJAL	1.11
3	(Cuba) CALDERON	0.96
4	(Soviet Union) OGUIENKO	0.93
5	(United States) ODEN K.	0.89

Best servers

Rank	Name	Avg
1	(Cuba) CALDERON	0.41
2	(Brazil) MOSER	0.40
3	(Cuba) ORTIZ	0.35

Best receivers

Rank	Name	%Succ
1	(Cuba) LUIS	70.34
2	(South Korea) CHANG Yoon Hee	69.54
3	(Brazil) SANGLARD	67.42

Best diggers

Rank	Name	Avg
1	(South Korea) CHANG Yoon Hee	2.91
2	(United States) KEMNER	2.83
3	(Japan) OBAYASHI	2.32

Best setters

Rank	Name	Avg
1	(China) MA Fang	9.98
2	(United States) ENDICOTT	9.27
3	(Soviet Union) PARKHOMCHUK	8.56
4	(Brazil) VENTURINI	6.31
5	(Peru) GARCIA	5.32
