= Mayvelis Martínez =

Cuban volleyball player

Maybelis Martínez

Personal information
- Full name: Maybelis Martínez Adlúm
- Nationality: Cuban
- Born: 12 June 1977 (age 49)
- Height: 1.78 m (5 ft 10 in)
- Weight: 74 kg (163 lb)
- Spike: 318 cm (125 in)
- Block: 315 cm (124 in)

Volleyball information
- Position: Libero (2004)
- Number: 5

National team
1993–2005	Cuba
Honours
Women's volleyball
Representing Cuba
Olympic Games
Bronze medal – third place	2004 Athens	Team
Pan American Games
Silver medal – second place	2003 Santo Domingo	Team
Central American and Caribbean Games
Gold medal – first place	1993 Ponce	Team
Gold medal – first place	1998 Maracaibo	Team

Maybelis Martínez (born 12 June 1977) is a Cuban former volleyball player who was a member of the Cuban women's national volleyball team. She competed at the 2004 Summer Olympics in Athens.

While representing Cuba, Martínez participated at the 2001 FIVB World Grand Prix, the 2002 FIVB World Grand Prix, and won the bronze medal at the 2004 Olympic tournament.
