= Anniara Muñoz =

Cuban volleyball player (born 1980)

Personal information
- Full name: Anniara Muñoz Carrazana
- Nationality: Cuban
- Born: 24 January 1980 (age 46)
- Height: 1.80 m (5 ft 11 in)
- Weight: 69 kg (152 lb)
- Spike: 320 cm (126 in)
- Block: 312 cm (123 in)

Volleyball information
- Position: Universal
- Current club: Cienfuegos
- Number: 13

National team
2002–2006	Cuba
Honours
Women's volleyball
Representing Cuba
Olympic Games
Bronze medal – third place	2004 Athens	Team
Pan American Games
Silver medal – second place	2003 Santo Domingo	Team

Anniara Muñoz Carrazana (born January 24, 1980) is a Cuban volleyball player who competed with the Cuba women's national volleyball team at the 2004 Summer Olympics winning the bronze medal. She also competed at the 2002 FIVB Volleyball Women's World Championship in Germany. On club level she played with Cienfuegos.

== Clubs ==
- Cienfuegos (2002)
