= Luis Calderon =

Cuban volleyball player (1952–2009)

Luis Calderón

Personal information
- Full name: Luis Felipe Calderón Blet
- Born: 2 May 1952; Havana, Cuba
- Died: 17 June 2009 (aged 57); Havana, Cuba

Volleyball information
- Number: 7

National team
1970–1972	Cuba
Honours
Men's volleyball
Representing Cuba
Pan American Games
Gold medal – first place	1971 Cali	Team
Central American and Caribbean Games
Gold medal – first place	1970 Panama City	Team

Luis Felipe Calderón Blet (2 May 1952 – 17 June 2009), also known as Luis Felipe Calderón, was a Cuban volleyball player and coach. Calderón competed with the Cuban men's national volleyball team at the 1972 Summer Olympics in Munich. The year before, in 1971, he won a gold medal with the Cuban team at the Pan American Games in Cali.

== Coaching ==
Calderón was the head coach of the Cuban women's national volleyball team for the 2000 Summer Olympics in Sydney and the 2004 Summer Olympics in Athens, winning a gold medal and a bronze medal, respectively. He also coached the Cuban women during the 2002 FIVB World Championship in Germany and the 2006 FIVB World Championship in Japan.

== Personal life and death ==
Calderón's daughter, Rosir Calderón, played for the Cuban national volleyball team and won a bronze medal at the 2004 Summer Olympics.

Calderón died on 17 June 2009, after a long illness.
