= Lafata =

Lafata is a surname. Notable people with the surname include:

- David Lafata (born 1981), Czech footballer
- Joe Lafata (1921–2004), American baseball player

== See also ==
- Lafita
