= 2010 FIVB Volleyball World Grand Prix =

International women's volleyball tournament

2010 FIVB World Grand Prix
Tournament details
- Host country: China (Final)
- Dates: 6–29 August
- Teams: 12
- Venue: 1 (in 1 host city)

Final positions
- Champions: United States (3rd title)
- Runners-up: Brazil
- Third place: Italy
- Fourth place: China

Tournament awards
- MVP: Foluke Akinradewo (USA)

The 2010 FIVB World Grand Prix was a women's volleyball tournament to be played by 12 countries from 6–29 August 2010. The finals were held at the Beilun Gymnasium in Ningbo, China.

The United States claimed their 3rd title and Foluke Akinradewo of the United States won the Most Valuable Player award.

== Competing nations ==
The following national teams qualified:

Europe	America	Asia
Poland; Netherlands; Italy; Germany	Brazil; Puerto Rico; Dominican Republic; United States	China; Japan; Chinese Taipei; Thailand

== Calendar ==
Week 1 6–8 August 2010
Group A: São Carlos, Brazil	Group B: Gdynia, Poland	Group C: Chengdu, China
Brazil; Italy; Japan; Chinese Taipei	Poland; Germany; United States; Dominican Republic	China; Netherlands; Thailand; Puerto Rico
Week 2 13–15 August 2010
Group D: Bangkok, Thailand	Group E: Macau	Group F: Okayama, Japan
Thailand; Italy; United States; Puerto Rico	China; Brazil; Netherlands; Dominican Republic	Japan; Poland; Germany; Chinese Taipei
Week 3 20–22 August 2010
Group G: Hong Kong	Group H: Taipei, Chinese Taipei	Group I: Tokyo, Japan
China; United States; Germany; Thailand	Chinese Taipei; Brazil; Poland; Puerto Rico	Japan; Italy; Netherlands; Dominican Republic
Week 4 Final round 25–29 August 2010
Ningbo, China
Top five teams Brazil; United States; Poland; Japan; Italy and China as host

== Standing and tie-breaking procedure ==
Match won 3–0 or 3–1: 3 points for the winner, 0 points for the loser
Match won 3–2: 2 points for the winner, 1 point for the loser
In case of tie, the teams will be classified according to the following criteria:
number of matches won, points ratio and sets ratio

== Preliminary rounds ==
=== Ranking ===
The host China and top five teams in the preliminary round advanced to the final round.

Pos	Team	Pld	W	L	Pts	SPW	SPL	SPR	SW	SL	SR	Qualification
1	Brazil	9	8	1	24	711	535	1.329	25	4	6.250	Final round
2	United States	9	7	2	21	802	652	1.230	23	10	2.300	Final round
3	Poland	9	7	2	21	726	651	1.115	22	9	2.444	Final round
4	Japan	9	6	3	19	830	725	1.145	21	13	1.615	Final round
5	Italy	9	6	3	19	811	757	1.071	22	12	1.833	Final round
6	China	9	6	3	19	718	671	1.070	21	11	1.909	Hosts for the final round
7	Netherlands	9	5	4	13	721	731	0.986	17	16	1.063	
8	Dominican Republic	9	3	6	7	767	863	0.889	13	24	0.542	
9	Germany	9	2	7	7	727	803	0.905	12	22	0.545	
10	Thailand	9	2	7	6	657	727	0.904	8	23	0.348	
11	Puerto Rico	9	1	8	4	600	747	0.803	7	24	0.292	
12	Chinese Taipei	9	1	8	2	508	716	0.709	3	26	0.115	

=== First round ===
==== Group A ====
Date		Score		Set 1	Set 2	Set 3	Set 4	Set 5	Total	Report
6 Aug	Brazil	3–0	Chinese Taipei	25–15	25–19	25–12			75–46	P2 P3
6 Aug	Italy	1–3	Japan	28–30	29–27	20–25	13–25		90–107	P2 P3
7 Aug	Brazil	3–0	Japan	25–20	25–19	25–20			75–59	P2 P3
7 Aug	Chinese Taipei	0–3	Italy	15–25	20–25	19–25			54–75	P2 P3
8 Aug	Brazil	1–3	Italy	22–25	21–25	25–18	19–25		87–93	P2 P3
8 Aug	Japan	3–0	Chinese Taipei	25–16	25–16	25–16			75–48	P2 P3

==== Group B ====
Date		Score		Set 1	Set 2	Set 3	Set 4	Set 5	Total	Report
6 Aug	Dominican Republic	1–3	United States	24–26	25–22	14–25	19–25		82–98	P2 P3
6 Aug	Poland	3–1	Germany	25–18	16–25	25–22	26–24		92–89	P2 P3
7 Aug	Poland	3–0	Dominican Republic	25–23	25–16	25–14			75–54	P2 P3
7 Aug	United States	1–3	Germany	23–25	22–25	25–16	23–25		93–91	P2 P3
8 Aug	Poland	3–1	United States	16–25	26–24	25–19	25–23		92–91	P2 P3
8 Aug	Germany	2–3	Dominican Republic	19–25	25–22	29–31	25–16	17–19	115–113	P2 P3

==== Group C ====
Date		Score		Set 1	Set 2	Set 3	Set 4	Set 5	Total	Report
6 Aug	Netherlands	3–0	Thailand	25–22	25–22	25–23			75–67	P2 P3
6 Aug	China	3–0	Puerto Rico	25–20	25–18	25–22			75–60	P2 P3
7 Aug	Puerto Rico	0–3	Netherlands	9–25	12–25	21–25			42–75	P2 P3
7 Aug	Thailand	0–3	China	16–25	16–25	22–25			54–75	P2 P3
8 Aug	Thailand	0–3	Puerto Rico	22–25	23–25	21–25			66–75	P2 P3
8 Aug	China	3–1	Netherlands	19–25	25–20	25–15	25–21		94–81	P2 P3

=== Second round ===
==== Group D ====
Date		Score		Set 1	Set 2	Set 3	Set 4	Set 5	Total	Report
13 Aug	United States	3–1	Italy	26–28	26–24	25–23	25–15		102–90	P2 P3
13 Aug	Thailand	3–1	Puerto Rico	23–25	25–17	25–23	25–19		98–84	P2 P3
14 Aug	Puerto Rico	0–3	Italy	12–25	17–25	18–25			47–75	P2 P3
14 Aug	United States	3–0	Thailand	25–18	25–21	25–13			75–52	P2 P3
15 Aug	Puerto Rico	1–3	United States	25–21	22–25	12–25	15–25		74–96	P2 P3
15 Aug	Italy	3–1	Thailand	21–25	25–23	25–21	25–20		96–89	P2 P3

==== Group E ====
Date		Score		Set 1	Set 2	Set 3	Set 4	Set 5	Total	Report
13 Aug	Brazil	3–0	Dominican Republic	25–14	25–18	25–14			75–46	P2 P3
13 Aug	China	3–0	Netherlands	25–16	25–19	25–16			75–51	P2 P3
14 Aug	Brazil	3–1	Netherlands	25–21	21–25	25–15	26–24		97–85	P2 P3
14 Aug	China	2–3	Dominican Republic	20–25	25–20	25–21	22–25	9–15	101–106	P2 P3
16 Aug	Netherlands	3–2	Dominican Republic	25–23	25–20	17–25	23–25	15–7	105–100	P2 P3
16 Aug	China	0–3	Brazil	12–25	19–25	19–25			50–75	P2 P3

==== Group F ====
Date		Score		Set 1	Set 2	Set 3	Set 4	Set 5	Total	Report
13 Aug	Chinese Taipei	0–3	Poland	16–25	19–25	15–25			50–75	P2 P3
13 Aug	Japan	3–1	Germany	26–28	25–17	25–20	25–11		101–76	P2 P3
14 Aug	Germany	3–0	Chinese Taipei	25–19	25–14	25–19			75–52	P2 P3
14 Aug	Japan	3–1	Poland	25–19	25–21	19–25	25–16		94–81	P2 P3
15 Aug	Germany	1–3	Poland	23–25	23–25	31–29	20–25		97–104	P2 P3
15 Aug	Japan	3–0	Chinese Taipei	28–26	25–15	25–11			78–52	P2 P3

=== Third round ===
==== Group G ====
Date		Score		Set 1	Set 2	Set 3	Set 4	Set 5	Total	Report
20 Aug	Germany	0–3	United States	15–25	18–25	13–25			46–75	P2 P3
20 Aug	China	3–1	Thailand	16–25	27–25	25–23	25–15		93–88	P2 P3
21 Aug	Thailand	0–3	United States	16–25	16–25	16–25			48–75	P2 P3
21 Aug	China	3–0	Germany	25–14	25–19	28–26			78–59	P2 P3
22 Aug	Germany	1–3	Thailand	25–20	16–25	16–25	22–25		79–95	P2 P3
22 Aug	China	1–3	United States	20–25	10–25	25–22	22–25		77–97	P2 P3

==== Group H ====
Date		Score		Set 1	Set 2	Set 3	Set 4	Set 5	Total	Report
20 Aug	Brazil	3–0	Puerto Rico	25–18	25–13	25–20			75–51	P2 P3
20 Aug	Poland	3–0	Chinese Taipei	25–19	25–18	25–9			75–46	P2 P3
21 Aug	Puerto Rico	0–3	Poland	20–25	20–25	14–25			54–75	P2 P3
21 Aug	Chinese Taipei	0–3	Brazil	15–25	17–25	16–25			48–75	P2 P3
22 Aug	Brazil	3–0	Poland	25–16	27–25	25–16			77–57	P2 P3
22 Aug	Chinese Taipei	3–2	Puerto Rico	27–29	25–21	18–25	25–23	17–15	112–113	P2 P3

==== Group I ====
Date		Score		Set 1	Set 2	Set 3	Set 4	Set 5	Total	Report
20 Aug	Italy	3–0	Netherlands	29–27	25–16	25–15			79–58	P2 P3
20 Aug	Japan	3–1	Dominican Republic	25–15	23–25	31–29	25–20		104–89	P2 P3
21 Aug	Dominican Republic	0–3	Netherlands	19–25	22–25	20–25			61–75	P2 P3
21 Aug	Japan	1–3	Italy	23–25	25–27	25–21	23–25		96–98	P2 P3
22 Aug	Dominican Republic	3–2	Italy	23–25	32–30	25–22	22–25	15–13	117–115	P2 P3
22 Aug	Japan	2–3	Netherlands	19–25	25–22	36–38	25–16	11–15	116–116	P2 P3

== Final round ==
- Venue: Beilun Gymnasium, Ningbo, China

Date		Score		Set 1	Set 2	Set 3	Set 4	Set 5	Total	Report
25 Aug	United States	3–2	Poland	13–25	18–25	28–26	25–19	15–12	99–107	P2 P3
25 Aug	Brazil	2–3	Japan	25–13	23–25	25–18	22–25	13–15	108–96	P2 P3
25 Aug	China	0–3	Italy	20–25	16–25	21–25			57–75	P2 P3
26 Aug	United States	3–0	Italy	25–23	25–20	25–14			75–57	P2 P3
26 Aug	Poland	1–3	Brazil	21–25	25–23	20–25	17–25		83–98	P2 P3
26 Aug	China	3–1	Japan	29–27	23–25	25–20	25–19		102–91	P2 P3
27 Aug	Japan	3–2	Italy	23–25	25–14	26–28	25–20	17–15	116–102	P2 P3
27 Aug	Brazil	2–3	United States	25–22	19–25	28–30	25–17	13–15	110–109	P2 P3
27 Aug	China	3–0	Poland	25–19	25–19	25–17			75–55	P2 P3
28 Aug	Poland	3–1	Japan	25–15	21–25	25–23	25–22		96–85	P2 P3
28 Aug	Brazil	3–0	Italy	25–18	25–13	25–16			75–47	P2 P3
28 Aug	China	0–3	United States	21–25	25–27	22–25			68–77	P2 P3
29 Aug	Japan	0–3	United States	24–26	20–25	23–25			67–76	P2 P3
29 Aug	Italy	3–1	Poland	23–25	25–15	25–23	25–17		98–80	P2 P3
29 Aug	China	0–3	Brazil	12–25	16–25	15–25			43–75	P2 P3

=== Final ranking ===
Pos	Team	Pld	W	L	Pts	SPW	SPL	SPR	SW	SL	SR
1	United States	5	5	0	13	436	409	1.066	15	4	3.750
2	Brazil	5	3	2	11	466	378	1.233	13	7	1.857
3	Italy	5	2	3	7	379	403	0.940	8	10	0.800
4	China	5	2	3	6	345	373	0.925	6	10	0.600
5	Japan	5	2	3	4	455	484	0.940	8	13	0.615
6	Poland	5	1	4	4	421	455	0.925	7	13	0.538

== Overall ranking ==
Place	Team
1st place, gold medalist(s)	United States
2nd place, silver medalist(s)	Brazil
3rd place, bronze medalist(s)	Italy
4	China
5	Japan
6	Poland
7	Netherlands
8	Dominican Republic
9	Germany
10	Thailand
11	Puerto Rico
12	Chinese Taipei

2010 FIVB Women's World Grand Prix winners

United States
Third title

Team roster:
Ogonna Nnamani, Alisha Glass, Stacy Sykora, Nicole Davis, Heather Bown, Cynthia Barboza, Jennifer Tamas, Jordan Larson, Nicole Fawcett, Logan Tom, Foluke Akinradewo, Nellie Spicer, Megan Hodge, Destinee Hooker.
Head coach: Hugh McCutcheon

== Individual awards ==
- Most valuable player:
  - Foluke Akinradewo (USA)
- Best spiker:
  - Jaqueline Carvalho (BRA)
- Best blocker:
  - Foluke Akinradewo (USA)
- Best server:
  - Wang Yimei (CHN)
- Best libero:
  - Zhang Xian (CHN)
- Best setter:
  - Alisha Glass (USA)
- Best scorer:
  - Saori Kimura (JPN)
