= 1978 FIVB Women's Volleyball World Championship =

1978 FIVB Women's World Championship
Tournament details
- Host country: Soviet Union
- Dates: 25 August – 6 September
- Teams: 24 (1 withdraw)
- Venue: (in 4 host cities)
- Officially opened by: Leonid Brezhnev

Final positions
- Champions: Cuba (1st title)
- Runners-up: Japan
- Third place: Soviet Union
- Fourth place: South Korea

The 1978 FIVB Women's World Championship was the eighth edition of the tournament, organised by the world's governing body, the FIVB. It was held from 25 August to 7 September 1978 in the Soviet Union.

== Teams ==
- Belgium
- Brazil
- Bulgaria
- Canada
- China
- Cuba
- Czechoslovakia
- Dominican Republic
- East Germany
- Finland
- Hungary
- Italy
- Japan
- Mexico
- Netherlands
- North Korea (withdraw)
- Peru
- Poland
- South Korea
- Soviet Union
- Tunisia
- United States
- West Germany
- Yugoslavia

== Venues ==
Pool E, L, Final round	Pool A, C, G, Final round	Host cities in the Soviet Union
Riga	Leningrad	Host cities in the Soviet Union
Capacity:	Capacity:	Host cities in the Soviet Union
Pool D, I, Final round	Pool B, F, H	Host cities in the Soviet Union
Minsk	Volgograd	Host cities in the Soviet Union
Capacity:	Capacity:	Host cities in the Soviet Union

== Format ==
The tournament was played in three different stages (first, second and final rounds). In the First round, the 23 participants were divided in six groups (A to F, five groups of four teams and one group of three teams). A single round-robin format was played within each group to determine the teams group position, all teams progressed to the next round.

In the Second round, four new groups were created, two groups of six teams playing for 1st-12th (G and H) and two groups (one of six teams and one of five teams) playing for 13th-23rd (I and L), teams were allocated to a group according to their First round group position (best two teams of each group going to 1st-12th groups and the remaining teams to 13th-23rd groups). A single round-robin format was played within each group to determine the teams group position, matches already played between teams in the First round also counted in this round, all teams progressed to the next round.

In the Final round, teams were allocated to a semifinal for placements according to their Second round group position (groups G and H best two teams to 1st-4th, third and fourth to 5th-8th, fifth and sixth to 9th-12th while groups I and L best two teams to 13th-16th, third and fourth to 16th-20th, fifth and sixth to 21st-23rd). Winners and losers of all semifinals played a last match for final standings places.

== Pools composition ==
Pool A	Pool B	Pool C	Pool D	Pool E	Pool F
Bulgaria	Italy	Brazil	Belgium	China	Cuba
Dominican Republic	Japan	Canada	Czechoslovakia	Finland	Netherlands
~~North Korea~~	Tunisia	South Korea	East Germany	Hungary	Peru
Soviet Union	United States	West Germany	Mexico	Poland	Yugoslavia

== Results ==
=== First round ===
==== Pool A ====
Location: Leningrad

Pos	Team	Pld	W	L	Pts	SW	SL	SR	SPW	SPL	SPR	Qualification
1	Soviet Union	2	2	0	4	6	0	MAX	90	22	4.091	1st–12th pools
2	Bulgaria	2	1	1	3	3	3	1.000	60	62	0.968	1st–12th pools
3	Dominican Republic	2	0	2	2	0	6	0.000	24	90	0.267	13th–23rd pools

Date		Score		Set 1	Set 2	Set 3	Set 4	Set 5	Total
25 Aug	Soviet Union	3–0	Bulgaria	15–3	15–3	15–9			45–15
26 Aug	Soviet Union	3–0	Dominican Republic	15–1	15–1	15–5			45–7
27 Aug	Bulgaria	3–0	Dominican Republic	15–3	15–8	15–6			45–17

==== Pool B ====
Location: Volgograd

Pos	Team	Pld	W	L	Pts	SW	SL	SR	SPW	SPL	SPR	Qualification
1	Japan	3	3	0	6	9	2	4.500	151	70	2.157	1st–12th pools
2	United States	3	2	1	5	8	3	2.667	148	84	1.762	1st–12th pools
3	Italy	3	1	2	4	3	6	0.500	70	99	0.707	13th–23rd pools
4	Tunisia	3	0	3	3	0	9	0.000	19	135	0.141	13th–23rd pools

Date		Score		Set 1	Set 2	Set 3	Set 4	Set 5	Total
25 Aug	Italy	3–0	Tunisia	15–2	15–3	15–4			45–9
25 Aug	Japan	3–2	United States	15–9	7–15	15–11	9–15	15–8	61–58
26 Aug	United States	3–0	Tunisia	15–5	15–1	15–1			45–7
26 Aug	Japan	3–0	Italy	15–5	15–2	15–2			45–9
27 Aug	Japan	3–0	Tunisia	15–2	15–0	15–1			45–3
27 Aug	United States	3–0	Italy	15–11	15–1	15–4			45–16

==== Pool C ====
Location: Leningrad

Pos	Team	Pld	W	L	Pts	SW	SL	SR	SPW	SPL	SPR	Qualification
1	South Korea	3	3	0	6	9	0	MAX	135	50	2.700	1st–12th pools
2	Brazil	3	2	1	5	6	4	1.500	105	113	0.929	1st–12th pools
3	Canada	3	1	2	4	4	6	0.667	111	105	1.057	13th–23rd pools
4	West Germany	3	0	3	3	0	9	0.000	52	135	0.385	13th–23rd pools

Date		Score		Set 1	Set 2	Set 3	Set 4	Set 5	Total
25 Aug	Brazil	3–0	West Germany	15–8	15–9	15–7			45–24
25 Aug	South Korea	3–0	Canada	15–10	15–2	15–10			45–22
26 Aug	South Korea	3–0	West Germany	15–1	15–7	15–8			45–16
26 Aug	Brazil	3–1	Canada	3–15	15–6	15–11	15–12		48–44
27 Aug	South Korea	3–0	Brazil	15–3	15–3	15–6			45–12
27 Aug	Canada	3–0	West Germany	15–1	15–11	15–0			45–12

==== Pool D ====
Location: Minsk

Pos	Team	Pld	W	L	Pts	SW	SL	SR	SPW	SPL	SPR	Qualification
1	East Germany	3	3	0	6	9	2	4.500	156	83	1.880	1st–12th pools
2	Czechoslovakia	3	2	1	5	6	3	2.000	124	86	1.442	1st–12th pools
3	Mexico	3	1	2	4	5	6	0.833	117	139	0.842	13th–23rd pools
4	Belgium	3	0	3	3	0	9	0.000	46	135	0.341	13th–23rd pools

Date		Score		Set 1	Set 2	Set 3	Set 4	Set 5	Total
25 Aug	Czechoslovakia	3–0	Mexico	15–6	20–18	15–3			50–27
25 Aug	East Germany	3–0	Belgium	15–2	15–3	15–4			45–9
26 Aug	Czechoslovakia	3–0	Belgium	15–1	15–8	15–5			45–14
26 Aug	East Germany	3–2	Mexico	15–3	15–17	15–3	6–15	15–7	66–45
27 Aug	Mexico	3–0	Belgium	15–11	15–6	15–6			45–23
27 Aug	East Germany	3–0	Czechoslovakia	15–10	15–6	15–13			45–29

==== Pool E ====
Location: Riga

Pos	Team	Pld	W	L	Pts	SW	SL	SR	SPW	SPL	SPR	Qualification
1	China	3	3	0	6	9	0	MAX	136	54	2.519	1st–12th pools
2	Poland	3	2	1	5	6	4	1.500	118	120	0.983	1st–12th pools
3	Hungary	3	1	2	4	4	6	0.667	122	114	1.070	13th–23rd pools
4	Finland	3	0	3	3	0	9	0.000	47	135	0.348	13th–23rd pools

Date		Score		Set 1	Set 2	Set 3	Set 4	Set 5	Total
25 Aug	Poland	3–0	Finland	15–11	15–12	15–5			45–28
25 Aug	China	3–0	Hungary	15–4	15–12	16–14			46–30
26 Aug	China	3–0	Finland	15–3	15–1	15–4			45–8
26 Aug	Poland	3–1	Hungary	15–13	12–15	15–10	15–9		57–47
27 Aug	China	3–0	Poland	15–2	15–8	15–6			45–16
27 Aug	Hungary	3–0	Finland	15–4	15–2	15–5			45–11

==== Pool F ====
Location: Volgograd

Pos	Team	Pld	W	L	Pts	SW	SL	SR	SPW	SPL	SPR	Qualification
1	Cuba	3	3	0	6	9	1	9.000	148	59	2.508	1st–12th pools
2	Peru	3	2	1	5	6	3	2.000	112	72	1.556	1st–12th pools
3	Yugoslavia	3	1	2	4	4	7	0.571	84	146	0.575	13th–23rd pools
4	Netherlands	3	0	3	3	1	9	0.111	73	140	0.521	13th–23rd pools

Date		Score		Set 1	Set 2	Set 3	Set 4	Set 5	Total
25 Aug	Peru	3–0	Yugoslavia	15–2	15–7	15–1			45–10
25 Aug	Cuba	3–0	Netherlands	15–1	15–4	15–8			45–13
26 Aug	Yugoslavia	3–1	Netherlands	15–6	15–9	5–15	15–13		50–43
26 Aug	Cuba	3–0	Peru	15–7	15–12	15–3			45–22
27 Aug	Cuba	3–1	Yugoslavia	15–5	13–15	15–2	15–2		58–24
27 Aug	Peru	3–0	Netherlands	15–2	15–8	15–7			45–17

=== Second round ===
The results and the points of the matches between the same teams that were already played during the first round are taken into account for the second round.

==== 1st–12th pools ====
===== Pool G =====
Location: Leningrad

Pos	Team	Pld	W	L	Pts	SW	SL	SR	SPW	SPL	SPR	Qualification
1	South Korea	5	4	1	9	13	3	4.333	229	145	1.579	Finals
2	Soviet Union	5	4	1	9	12	3	4.000	217	114	1.904	Finals
3	China	5	4	1	9	12	4	3.000	213	159	1.340	5th–8th places
4	Brazil	5	2	3	7	6	13	0.462	171	241	0.710	5th–8th places
5	Bulgaria	5	1	4	6	5	13	0.385	158	241	0.656	9th–12th places
6	Poland	5	0	5	5	3	15	0.200	154	242	0.636	9th–12th places

Date		Score		Set 1	Set 2	Set 3	Set 4	Set 5	Total
30 Aug	Soviet Union	3–0	Brazil	15–5	15–5	15–6			45–16
30 Aug	China	3–0	Bulgaria	15–11	15–12	15–6			45–29
30 Aug	South Korea	3–0	Poland	15–5	15–8	15–9			45–22
31 Aug	Bulgaria	3–1	Poland	4–15	15–11	15–6	15–9		49–41
31 Aug	South Korea	3–0	Soviet Union	15–13	15–12	15–12			45–37
31 Aug	China	3–0	Brazil	15–3	15–7	15–10			45–20
1 Sep	Brazil	3–2	Poland	15–7	15–8	7–15	6–15	15–10	58–55
1 Sep	South Korea	3–0	Bulgaria	15–9	15–2	15–3			45–14
1 Sep	Soviet Union	3–0	China	15–4	15–4	15–10			45–18
2 Sep	China	3–1	South Korea	16–14	14–16	15–9	15–10		60–49
2 Sep	Soviet Union	3–0	Poland	15–2	15–8	15–10			45–20
2 Sep	Brazil	3–2	Bulgaria	15–4	6–15	14–16	15–7	15–9	65–51

===== Pool H =====
Location: Volgograd

Pos	Team	Pld	W	L	Pts	SW	SL	SR	SPW	SPL	SPR	Qualification
1	Cuba	5	5	0	10	15	0	MAX	225	114	1.974	Finals
2	Japan	5	4	1	9	12	8	1.500	261	206	1.267	Finals
3	United States	5	3	2	8	11	6	1.833	213	194	1.098	5th–8th places
4	East Germany	5	2	3	7	6	11	0.545	192	221	0.869	5th–8th places
5	Peru	5	1	4	6	6	14	0.429	202	266	0.759	9th–12th places
6	Czechoslovakia	5	0	5	5	4	15	0.267	173	265	0.653	9th–12th places

Date		Score		Set 1	Set 2	Set 3	Set 4	Set 5	Total
30 Aug	Japan	3–0	East Germany	15–9	15–3	15–10			45–22
30 Aug	Cuba	3–0	United States	15–7	15–3	15–10			45–20
30 Aug	Peru	3–2	Czechoslovakia	16–14	6–15	15–2	8–15	15–5	60–51
31 Aug	Japan	3–1	Peru	13–15	15–9	15–4	15–6		58–34
31 Aug	United States	3–0	East Germany	15–13	15–11	15–11			45–35
31 Aug	Cuba	3–0	Czechoslovakia	15–1	15–9	15–12			45–22
1 Sep	United States	3–0	Peru	15–8	15–10	15–11			45–29
1 Sep	Cuba	3–0	East Germany	15–4	15–6	15–13			45–23
1 Sep	Japan	3–2	Czechoslovakia	13–15	15–4	15–8	12–15	15–5	70–47
2 Sep	East Germany	3–2	Peru	12–15	15–10	10–15	15–6	15–11	67–57
2 Sep	Cuba	3–0	Japan	15–8	15–9	15–10			45–27
2 Sep	United States	3–0	Czechoslovakia	15–0	15–12	15–12			45–24

==== 13th–23rd pools ====
===== Pool I =====
Location: Minsk

Pos	Team	Pld	W	L	Pts	SW	SL	SR	SPW	SPL	SPR	Qualification
1	Mexico	5	5	0	10	15	4	3.750	265	164	1.616	13th–16th places
2	Yugoslavia	5	4	1	9	14	4	3.500	246	158	1.557	13th–16th places
3	Italy	5	3	2	8	9	6	1.500	175	157	1.115	17th–20th places
4	Netherlands	5	2	3	7	9	9	1.000	229	192	1.193	17th–20th places
5	Belgium	5	1	4	6	3	12	0.250	123	185	0.665	21st–23rd places
6	Tunisia	5	0	5	5	0	15	0.000	43	225	0.191	21st–23rd places

Date		Score		Set 1	Set 2	Set 3	Set 4	Set 5	Total
30 Aug	Yugoslavia	3–0	Belgium	15–10	15–3	15–7			45–20
30 Aug	Mexico	3–0	Tunisia	15–0	15–1	15–2			45–3
30 Aug	Italy	3–0	Netherlands	15–13	15–12	15–11			45–36
31 Aug	Belgium	3–0	Tunisia	15–3	15–2	15–0			45–5
31 Aug	Mexico	3–2	Netherlands	18–16	5–15	15–12	12–15	15–2	65–60
31 Aug	Yugoslavia	3–0	Italy	15–6	15–11	15–6			45–23
1 Sep	Netherlands	3–0	Tunisia	15–6	15–12	15–1			45–19
1 Sep	Italy	3–0	Belgium	15–8	15–8	15–6			45–22
1 Sep	Mexico	3–2	Yugoslavia	14–16	15–13	6–15	15–6	15–11	65–61
2 Sep	Mexico	3–0	Italy	15–7	15–7	15–3			45–17
2 Sep	Netherlands	3–0	Belgium	15–2	15–10	15–1			45–13
2 Sep	Yugoslavia	3–0	Tunisia	15–2	15–2	15–3			45–7

===== Pool L =====
Location: Riga

Pos	Team	Pld	W	L	Pts	SW	SL	SR	SPW	SPL	SPR	Qualification
1	Hungary	4	4	0	8	12	0	MAX	181	61	2.967	13th–16th places
2	Canada	4	3	1	7	9	4	2.250	159	123	1.293	13th–16th places
3	Dominican Republic	4	2	2	6	6	8	0.750	150	164	0.915	17th–20th places
4	West Germany	4	1	3	5	4	11	0.364	135	199	0.678	17th–20th places
5	Finland	4	0	4	4	4	12	0.333	143	221	0.647	21st–23rd places

Date		Score		Set 1	Set 2	Set 3	Set 4	Set 5	Total
30 Aug	West Germany	3–2	Finland	12–15	12–15	15–13	15–4	15–10	69–57
30 Aug	Hungary	3–0	Dominican Republic	15–6	16–14	15–1			46–21
31 Aug	Canada	3–1	Finland	15–8	7–15	15–6	16–14		53–43
31 Aug	Dominican Republic	3–1	West Germany	15–3	7–15	15–7	15–13		52–38
1 Sep	Hungary	3–0	West Germany	15–7	15–2	15–7			45–16
1 Sep	Canada	3–0	Dominican Republic	18–16	15–1	15–6			48–23
2 Sep	Hungary	3–0	Canada	15–6	15–0	15–7			45–13
2 Sep	Dominican Republic	3–1	Finland	8–15	16–14	15–1	15–2		54–32

=== Final round ===
==== 21st–23rd places ====
21st–23rd semifinals
5 September – Leningrad
Finland	3
Tunisia	0
Belgium
Bye

21st place
6 September – Leningrad
Finland	3
Belgium	2

===== 21st–23rd semifinals =====
Date		Score		Set 1	Set 2	Set 3	Set 4	Set 5	Total
5 Sep	Finland	3–0	Tunisia	15–7	15–4	15–4			45–15

===== 21st place match =====
Date		Score		Set 1	Set 2	Set 3	Set 4	Set 5	Total
6 Sep	Finland	3–2	Belgium	14–16	15–10	11–15	15–4	15–12	70–57

==== 17th–20th places ====
17th–20th semifinals
5 September – Riga
Netherlands	3
Dominican Republic	1
5 September – Riga
West Germany	3
Italy	1

17th place
6 September – Riga
Netherlands	3
West Germany	1
19th place
6 September – Riga
Dominican Republic	3
Italy	2

===== 17th–20th semifinals =====
Date		Score		Set 1	Set 2	Set 3	Set 4	Set 5	Total
5 Sep	Netherlands	3–1	Dominican Republic	20–18	15–7	13–15	17–15		65–55
5 Sep	West Germany	3–1	Italy	14–16	15–10	15–9	17–15		61–50

===== 19th place match =====
Date		Score		Set 1	Set 2	Set 3	Set 4	Set 5	Total
6 Sep	Dominican Republic	3–2	Italy	1–15	15–10	15–13	5–15	15–10	51–63

===== 17th place match =====
Date		Score		Set 1	Set 2	Set 3	Set 4	Set 5	Total
6 Sep	Netherlands	3–1	West Germany	15–5	15–5	9–15	15–9		54–34

==== 13th–16th places ====
13th–16th semifinals
5 September – Minsk
Hungary	3
Yugoslavia	0
5 September – Minsk
Canada	3
Mexico	0

13th place
6 September – Minsk
Hungary	3
Canada	0
15th place
6 September – Minsk
Yugoslavia	0
Mexico	3

===== 13th–16th semifinals =====
Date		Score		Set 1	Set 2	Set 3	Set 4	Set 5	Total
5 Sep	Hungary	3–0	Yugoslavia	15–10	15–3	15–5			45–18
5 Sep	Canada	3–0	Mexico	15–13	15–10	15–4			45–27

===== 15th place match =====
Date		Score		Set 1	Set 2	Set 3	Set 4	Set 5	Total
6 Sep	Yugoslavia	0–3	Mexico	10–15	13–15	3–15			26–45

===== 13th place match =====
Date		Score		Set 1	Set 2	Set 3	Set 4	Set 5	Total
6 Sep	Hungary	3–0	Canada	15–5	15–4	15–11			45–20

==== 9th–12th places ====
9th–12th semifinals
5 September – Minsk
Bulgaria	3
Czechoslovakia	2
5 September – Minsk
Peru	3
Poland	0

9th place
6 September – Minsk
Bulgaria	3
Peru	2
11th place
6 September – Minsk
Czechoslovakia	2
Poland	3

===== 9th–12th semifinals =====
Date		Score		Set 1	Set 2	Set 3	Set 4	Set 5	Total
5 Sep	Bulgaria	3–2	Czechoslovakia	15–11	7–15	15–8	9–15	15–13	61–62
5 Sep	Peru	3–0	Poland	15–4	15–6	15–11			45–21

===== 11th place match =====
Date		Score		Set 1	Set 2	Set 3	Set 4	Set 5	Total
6 Sep	Czechoslovakia	2–3	Poland	4–15	15–3	16–18	15–8	6–15	56–59

===== 9th place match =====
Date		Score		Set 1	Set 2	Set 3	Set 4	Set 5	Total
6 Sep	Bulgaria	3–2	Peru	15–9	11–15	11–15	15–8	17–15	69–62

==== 5th–8th places ====
5th–8th semifinals
5 September – Riga
United States	3
Brazil	0
5 September – Riga
China	3
East Germany	2

5th place
6 September – Riga
United States	3
China	0
7th place
6 September – Riga
Brazil	3
East Germany	2

===== 5th–8th semifinals =====
Date		Score		Set 1	Set 2	Set 3	Set 4	Set 5	Total
5 Sep	United States	3–0	Brazil	15–5	15–13	15–8			45–26
5 Sep	China	3–2	East Germany	15–7	11–15	9–15	15–5	15–8	65–50

===== 7th place match =====
Date		Score		Set 1	Set 2	Set 3	Set 4	Set 5	Total
6 Sep	Brazil	3–2	East Germany	16–18	16–14	16–14	11–15	15–13	74–74

===== 5th place match =====
Date		Score		Set 1	Set 2	Set 3	Set 4	Set 5	Total
6 Sep	United States	3–0	China	15–13	15–11	15–10			45–34

==== Finals ====
Semifinals
5 September – Leningrad
Cuba	3
Soviet Union	1
5 September – Leningrad
Japan	3
South Korea	1

Final
6 September – Leningrad
Cuba	3
Japan	0
3rd place
6 September – Leningrad
Soviet Union	3
South Korea	1

===== Semifinals =====
Date		Score		Set 1	Set 2	Set 3	Set 4	Set 5	Total
5 Sep	Cuba	3–1	Soviet Union	12–15	16–14	15–10	15–12		58–51
5 Sep	Japan	3–1	South Korea	12–15	15–8	15–11	15–11		57–45

===== 3rd place match =====
Date		Score		Set 1	Set 2	Set 3	Set 4	Set 5	Total
6 Sep	Soviet Union	3–1	South Korea	15–2	15–7	11–15	15–9		56–33

===== Final =====
Date		Score		Set 1	Set 2	Set 3	Set 4	Set 5	Total
6 Sep	Cuba	3–0	Japan	15–6	15–9	15–10			45–25

== Final standing ==
Rank	Team
1st place, gold medalist(s)	Cuba
2nd place, silver medalist(s)	Japan
3rd place, bronze medalist(s)	Soviet Union
4	South Korea
5	United States
6	China
7	Brazil
8	East Germany
9	Bulgaria
10	Peru
11	Poland
12	Czechoslovakia
13	Hungary
14	Canada
15	Mexico
16	Yugoslavia
17	Netherlands
18	West Germany
19	Dominican Republic
20	Italy
21	Finland
22	Belgium
23	Tunisia
24	North Korea

Qualified for the 1980 Olympic Games as hosts
Qualified for the 1980 Olympic Games

1978 Women's World champions

Cuba
1st title

Team roster
Nelly Barnet, Ana Díaz, Erenia Díaz, Ana María García, Mavis Guilarte, Libertad González, Sirenia Martínez, Mercedes Pérez, Mercedes Pomares, Imilsis Téllez, Lucila Urgelles
Head coach
Eugenio George
