= Volleyball at the 1995 Pan American Games =

- Start date: 12 March 1995
- End date: 18 March 1995

This page presents the results of the men's and women's volleyball tournament of the 1995 Pan American Games, which was held in the Polideportivo from 12 March to 18 March 1995 in Mar del Plata, Argentina.

== Medal summary ==
=== Medal table ===
* Host nation (Argentina)

Rank	Nation	Gold	Silver	Bronze	Total
1	Cuba	1	0	1	2
2	Argentina*	1	0	0	1
3	United States	0	2	0	2
4	Canada	0	0	1	1
Totals (4 entries)		2	2	2	6

=== Events ===
Event	Gold	Silver	Bronze
Men's	Argentina	United States	Cuba
Women's	Cuba	United States	Canada

== Men's indoor tournament ==
=== Teams ===
Group A

- Argentina
- Puerto Rico
- United States

Group B

- Brazil
- Canada
- Cuba
- Venezuela

=== Final round ===
Semifinals
1995-03-17 – Mar del Plata
Argentina	3
Venezuela	0
1995-03-17 – Mar del Plata
United States	3
Cuba	2

Final
1995-03-18 – Mar del Plata
Argentina	3
United States	2
3rd place
1995-03-18 – Mar del Plata
Venezuela	0
Cuba	3

=== Final ranking ===
Place	Team
1.	Argentina
2.	United States
3.	Cuba
4.	Venezuela
5.	Canada
6.	Puerto Rico
7.	Brazil

1995 Pan American Games winners

Argentina
First title

== Women's indoor tournament ==
=== Final round ===
Semifinals
1995-03-17 – Mar del Plata
United States	3
Canada	0
1995-03-17 – Mar del Plata
Cuba	3
Argentina	0

Final
1995-03-18 – Mar del Plata
United States	1
Cuba	3
3rd place
1995-03-18 – Mar del Plata
Canada	3
Argentina	1

=== Final ranking ===
Place	Team
1.	Cuba
2.	United States
3.	Canada
4.	Argentina
5.	Peru
6.	Brazil

1995 Pan American Games winners

Cuba
Seventh title
