= Volleyball at the 2003 Pan American Games =

- Dates: August 3 to August 15, 2003

This page presents the results of the Men's and Women's Volleyball Tournament during the 2003 Pan American Games, which was held from August 3 to August 15, 2003, in Santo Domingo, Dominican Republic. There were four medal events, two (indoor and beach) for both men and women.

== Men's Volleyball tournament ==
=== Preliminary round ===
==== Group A ====
Team	Pld	W	L	SF	SA	Diff	Pts
United States	3	3	0	9	2	+7	6
Venezuela	3	2	1	8	5	+3	5
Dominican Republic	3	1	2	5	6	-1	4
Barbados	3	0	3	0	9	-9	3

- August 3

United States	3-0	Barbados	(25–15, 25–21, 25–15)
Dominican Republic	2-3	Venezuela	(20–25, 25–23, 24–26, 25–22, 10–15)

- August 5

Barbados	0-3	Venezuela	(23–25, 21–25, 18–25)
Dominican Republic	0-3	United States	(22–25, 24–26, 20–25)

- August 7

United States	3-2	Venezuela	(25–18, 25–20, 20–25, 13–25, 15–10)
Barbados	0-3	Dominican Republic	(22–25, 29–31, 18–25)

==== Group B ====
Team	Pld	W	L	SF	SA	Diff	Pts
Brazil	3	3	0	9	0	+9	6
Cuba	3	2	1	6	4	+2	5
Canada	3	1	2	3	6	-3	4
Puerto Rico	3	0	3	1	9	-8	3

- August 4

Cuba	3-1	Puerto Rico	(31–29, 25–22, 22–25, 25–17)
Canada	0-3	Brazil	(22–25, 21–25, 25–27)

- August 6

Cuba	3-0	Canada	(35–33, 25–21, 25–19)
Brazil	3-0	Puerto Rico	(25–21, 25–19, 25–22)

- August 8

Canada	3-0	Puerto Rico	(25–17, 27–25, 25–21)
Brazil	3-0	Cuba	(25–14, 25–17, 29–27)

=== Quarterfinals ===
- August 10

Cuba	3-1	Dominican Republic	(25–18, 21–25, 25–18, 25–11)
Venezuela	3-0	Canada	(26–24, 25–16, 29–27)

=== Final round ===
Semi-finals
2003-08-13 – Santo Domingo
Brazil	2
Venezuela	3
2003-08-13 – Santo Domingo
United States	2
Cuba	3

Final
2003-08-15 – Santo Domingo
Venezuela	3
Cuba	0
3rd place
2003-08-15 – Santo Domingo
Brazil	3
United States	0

==== Semifinals ====
- August 13

Brazil	2-3	Venezuela	(20–25, 25–19, 25–22, 19–25, 12–15)
United States	2-3	Cuba	(25–22, 19–25, 25–17, 23–25, 08–15)

==== Finals ====
===== Classification match (7th/8th place) =====
- August 10

Puerto Rico	3-0	Barbados	(29–27, 25–20, 25–18)

===== Classification match (5th/6th place) =====
- August 11

Dominican Republic	1-3	Canada	(21–25, 19–25, 25–20, 23–25)

===== Bronze-medal match =====
- August 15

Brazil	3-0	United States	(25–23, 25–17, 25–20)

===== Gold-medal match =====
- August 15

Venezuela	3-0	Cuba	(25–23, 25–18, 25–20)

=== Final standings ===
1. Venezuela
2. Cuba
3. Brazil
4. United States
5. Canada
6. Dominican Republic
7. Puerto Rico
8. Barbados

2003 Pan American Games winners

Venezuela
First title

=== Individual awards ===
- Most valuable player
  - (Venezuela) Ernardo Gómez
- Best attacker
  - (Venezuela) Ronald Méndez
- Best scorer
  - (Venezuela) Ernardo Gómez
- Best defender
  - (Brazil) Nalbert Bittencourt
- Best setter
  - (Venezuela) Rodman Valera
- Best server
  - (United States) Gabriel Gardner
- Best receiver
  - (Cuba) Yasser Portuondo
- Best libero
  - (Brazil) Sergio Santos
- Best blocker
  - (Brazil) Gustavo Endres

=== Team rosters ===
Brazil

- Maurício Lima
- Ricardo García
- Dante Amaral
- Nalbert Bitencourt
- Giba
- Anderson Rodrigues
- André Nascimento
- André Heller
- Gustavo Endres
- Rodrigo Santana
- Giovane Gávio
- Sérgio Santos

Cuba

- Tomás Aldazabal
- Javier Brito
- Yosleides Herrera
- Raydel Corrales
- Odelvis Dominico
- Ariel Gil
- Javier González
- Osmany Juantorena
- Pavel Pimienta
- Yasser Portuondo
- Maikel Salas
- Charles Vinent

Venezuela

- Juan Carlos Blanco
- Luis Díaz
- Thomas Ereu
- Hernardo Gómez
- Carlos Luna
- Andrés Manzanillo
- Iván Márquez
- Ronald Méndez
- Andy Rojas
- Carlos Tejeda
- Gustavo Valderrama
- Rodman Valera

United States

- Brook Billings
- Scott Bunker
- Gabriel Gardner
- David McKienzie
- Adam Naeve
- James Polster
- William Priddy
- Salmon Riley
- Christopher Siefert
- Erik Sullivan
- Donald Suxho
- Mackay Wilson

== Women's indoor tournament ==
=== Preliminary round ===
==== Group A ====
Team	Pld	W	L	SF	SA	Diff	Pts
Brazil	3	2	1	8	4	+4	5
United States	3	2	1	6	6	0	5
Puerto Rico	3	1	2	6	6	0	4
Peru	3	1	2	4	8	-4	4

- August 3

Puerto Rico	3-0	Peru	(25–19, 25–21, 25–15)
Brazil	3-0	United States	(30–28, 25–13, 25–18)

- August 5

Brazil	2-3	Peru	(25–21, 25–16, 22–25, 16–25, 6–15)
Puerto Rico	2-3	United States	(26–24, 23–25, 25–17, 23–25, 14–16)

- August 7

United States	3-1	Peru	(25–20, 21–25, 25–22, 25–22)
Brazil	3-1	Puerto Rico	(25–21, 25–16, 21–25, 30–28)

==== Group B ====
Team	Pld	W	L	SF	SA	Diff	Pts
Cuba	3	3	0	9	1	+8	6
Dominican Republic	3	2	1	7	3	+4	5
Venezuela	3	1	2	3	7	-4	4
Mexico	3	0	3	1	9	-8	3

- August 4

Cuba	3-0	Venezuela	(25–16, 25–17, 25–16)
Dominican Republic	3-0	Mexico	(25–23, 25–13, 25–18)

- August 6

Cuba	3-0	Mexico	(25–10, 25–23, 25–18)
Dominican Republic	3-0	Venezuela	(26–24, 25–19, 25–18)

- August 8

Mexico	1-3	Venezuela	(25–21, 19–25, 22–25, 18–25)
Dominican Republic	1-3	Cuba	(25–23, 20–25, 20–25, 21–25)

=== Quarterfinals ===
- August 10

United States	3-0	Venezuela	(25–18, 25–20, 36–34)
Dominican Republic	3-1	Puerto Rico	(25–23, 25–22, 18–25, 33–31)

=== Final round ===
Semi-finals
2003-08-13 – Santo Domingo
Brazil	2
Dominican Republic	3
2003-08-13 – Santo Domingo
United States	0
Cuba	3

Final
2003-08-14 – Santo Domingo
Dominican Republic	3
Cuba	2
3rd place
2003-08-14 – Santo Domingo
Brazil	1
United States	3

==== Semifinals ====
- August 13

Brazil	2-3	Dominican Republic	(18–25, 25–23, 25–23, 14–25, 13–15)
Cuba	3-0	United States	(25–19, 25–19, 25–21)

==== Finals ====
===== Classification match (7th/8th place) =====
- August 11

Peru	3-2	Mexico	(25–18, 29–27, 19–25, 22–25, 17–15)

===== Classification match (5th/6th place) =====
- August 12

Puerto Rico	1-3	Venezuela	(25–17, 20–25, 21–25, 24–26)

===== Bronze-medal match =====
- August 14

Brazil	1-3	United States	(23–25, 19–25, 25–19, 17–25)

===== Gold-medal match =====
August 14, 2003	Dominican Republic	3–2	Cuba
August 14, 2003	(25–16, 25–17, 14–25, 26–28, 15–13)

=== Final standings ===
1. Dominican Republic
2. Cuba
3. United States
4. Brazil
5. Venezuela
6. Puerto Rico
7. Peru
8. Mexico

2003 Pan American Games winners

Dominican Republic
First title

=== Awards ===
- Most valuable player
  - (Dominican Republic) Yudelkys Bautista
- Best attacker
  - (Cuba) Nancy Carrillo
- Best scorer
  - (United States) Nicole Branagh
- Best defender
  - (Dominican Republic) Cosiri Rodríguez
- Best setter
  - (United States) Lizzy Fitzgerald
- Best server
  - (Dominican Republic) Annerys Vargas
- Best receiver
  - (Dominican Republic) Cosiri Rodríguez
- Best libero
  - (Dominican Republic) Evelyn Carrera
- Best blocker
  - (Dominican Republic) Annerys Vargas
