= Volleyball at the 1971 Pan American Games =

This page presents the results of the men's and women's volleyball tournament during the 1971 Pan American Games, which was held from July 31 to August 11, 1971 in Cali, Colombia.

== Men's indoor tournament ==
=== Preliminary round ===
==== GROUP A ====
	Team	Points	G	W	L	SW	SL	Ratio
1.	Cuba	6	3	3	0	9	0	MAX
2.	Argentina	5	3	2	1	6	6	1.000
3.	Chile	4	3	1	2	4	7	0.571
4.	Puerto Rico	3	3	0	3	3	9	0.333

==== GROUP B ====
	Team	Points	G	W	L	SW	SL	Ratio
1.	Brazil	6	3	3	0	9	0	MAX
2.	Mexico	5	3	2	1	6	3	2.000
3.	Canada	4	3	1	2	3	6	0.500
4.	Haiti	3	3	0	3	0	9	0.000

==== GROUP C ====
	Team	Points	G	W	L	SW	SL	Ratio
1.	United States	6	3	3	0	9	0	MAX
2.	Venezuela	5	3	2	1	6	3	2.000
3.	Colombia	4	3	1	2	3	6	0.500
4.	Bahamas	3	3	0	3	0	9	0.000

=== Final Round ===
	Team	Points	G	W	L	SW	SL	Ratio
1.	Cuba	9	5	4	1	12	3	4.000
2.	United States	9	5	4	1	12	3	4.000
3.	Brazil	9	5	4	1	12	3	4.000
4.	Venezuela	7	5	2	3	6	10	0.600
5.	Argentina	4	4	0	4	1	12	0.083
6.	Mexico	4	4	0	4	0	12	0.000

=== Final ranking ===
1. Cuba
2. United States
3. Brazil
4. Venezuela
5. Mexico
6. Argentina
7. Chile
8. Haiti
9. Puerto Rico
10. Canada
11. Colombia
12. Bahamas

1971 Pan American Games winners

Cuba
First title

== Women's indoor tournament ==
=== Round Robin ===
	Team	Points	G	W	L	SW	SL	Ratio
1.	Cuba	16	8	8	0	24	1	24.000
2.	Peru	14	8	6	2	19	7	2.714
3.	Mexico	14	8	6	2	19	7	2.714
4.	Brazil	14	8	6	2	19	8	2.375
5.	Canada	12	8	4	4	14	14	1.000
6.	United States	11	8	3	5	10	15	0.666
7.	Colombia	10	8	2	6	7	18	0.388
8.	Haiti	9	8	1	7	3	21	0.142
9.	Bahamas	8	8	0	8	0	24	0.000

=== Final ranking ===
Place	Team
1.	Cuba
2.	Peru
3.	Mexico
4.	Brazil
5.	Canada
6.	United States
7.	Colombia
8.	Haiti
9.	Bahamas

1971 Pan American Games winners

Cuba
First title
