= Volleyball at the 1978 Central American and Caribbean Games =

Volleyball events were contested at the 1978 Central American and Caribbean Games in Medellín, Colombia.

Event	Gold	Silver	Bronze
Men's volleyball	Cuba (CUB)	Venezuela (VEN)	Mexico (MEX)
Women's volleyball	Cuba (CUB)	Mexico (MEX)	Dominican Republic (DOM)
