= 1978 Central American and Caribbean Games =

Sports events held in Medellín, Colombia

Central American and Caribbean Games
- Host city: Medellín
- Country: Colombia
- Edition: 13th
- Nations: 21
- Athletes: 2,605
- Opening: 7 July 1978
- Closing: 28 July 1978
- Opened by: Alfonso López Michelsen
- Torch lighter: Ramón Hoyos
- Main venue: Estadio Atanasio Girardot

The 13th Central American and Caribbean Games were held in Medellín, Colombia from July 7 to July 28, 1978, and included 2,605 athletes from nineteen nations, competing in 21 sports.

== Sports ==
- Athletics ()
- Baseball ()
- Basketball ()
- Boxing ()
- Cycling ()
- Diving ()
- Fencing ()
- Football ()
- Gymnastics ()
- Judo ()
- Shooting ()
- Softball ()
- Swimming ()
- Synchronized swimming ()
- Tennis ()
- Volleyball ()
- Water polo ()
- Weightlifting ()
- Wrestling ()

== Medal table ==
* Host nation (Colombia)

1978 Central American and Caribbean Games medal table
Rank	Nation	Gold	Silver	Bronze	Total
1	Cuba	120	44	18	182
2	Mexico	25	48	43	116
3	Puerto Rico	13	15	33	61
4	Colombia*	8	24	36	68
5	Jamaica	6	6	5	17
6	Venezuela	5	24	29	58
7	Dominican Republic	3	8	16	27
8	Costa Rica	2	4	3	9
9	Bahamas	2	0	2	4
10	Trinidad and Tobago	1	5	2	8
11	Netherlands Antilles	1	1	2	4
12	Virgin Islands	1	1	1	3
13	Bermuda	1	0	1	2
14	Panama	0	6	5	11
15	Nicaragua	0	1	2	3
16	Barbados	0	1	0	1
16	Suriname	0	1	0	1
18	Guatemala	0	0	6	6
19	El Salvador	0	0	2	2
Totals (19 entries)		188	189	206	583
