= Volleyball at the 1979 Pan American Games =

This page presents the results of the men's and women's volleyball tournament during the 1979 Pan American Games, which was held in the first two weeks of July, 1979 in Caguas, Puerto Rico.

== Men's indoor tournament ==
=== Final ranking ===
Place	Team
1.	Cuba
2.	Brazil
3.	Canada
4.	Mexico
5.	United States
6.	Puerto Rico
7.	Dominican Republic
8.	Venezuela

1979 Pan American Games winners

Cuba
Third title

== Women's indoor tournament ==
=== Final ranking ===
Place	Team
1.	Cuba
2.	Peru
3.	Brazil
4.	United States
5.	Mexico
6.	Canada
7.	Dominican Republic
8.	Puerto Rico

1979 Pan American Games winners

Cuba
Third title
