= 2014 FIVB Men's Volleyball World Championship squads =

This article shows the rosters of all participating teams at the 2014 FIVB Men's Volleyball World Championship in Poland.

== Pool A ==
=== Poland ===
The following is the Polish roster in the 2014 FIVB Men's Volleyball World Championship.

Head coach: (France) Stéphane Antiga

| No. | Name | Date of birth | Height | Weight | Spike | Block | 2014 club |
|---|---|---|---|---|---|---|---|
| 1 | Piotr Nowakowski | 18 December 1987 | 2.05 m (6 ft 9 in) | 90 kg (200 lb) | 355 cm (140 in) | 340 cm (130 in) | (Poland) Asseco Resovia Rzeszów |
| 2 | Michał Winiarski (c) | 28 September 1983 | 2.00 m (6 ft 7 in) | 82 kg (181 lb) | 345 cm (136 in) | 332 cm (131 in) | (Russia) Fakel Novy Urengoy |
| 3 | Dawid Konarski | 31 August 1989 | 1.98 m (6 ft 6 in) | 93 kg (205 lb) | 353 cm (139 in) | 320 cm (130 in) | (Poland) Asseco Resovia Rzeszów |
| 5 | Paweł Zagumny | 18 October 1977 | 2.00 m (6 ft 7 in) | 88 kg (194 lb) | 336 cm (132 in) | 317 cm (125 in) | (Poland) ZAKSA Kędzierzyn-Koźle |
| 7 | Karol Kłos | 8 August 1989 | 2.01 m (6 ft 7 in) | 87 kg (192 lb) | 357 cm (141 in) | 326 cm (128 in) | (Poland) PGE Skra Bełchatów |
| 8 | Andrzej Wrona | 27 December 1988 | 2.05 m (6 ft 9 in) | 95 kg (209 lb) | 350 cm (140 in) | 265 cm (104 in) | (Poland) PGE Skra Bełchatów |
| 10 | Mariusz Wlazły | 4 August 1983 | 1.94 m (6 ft 4 in) | 80 kg (180 lb) | 360 cm (140 in) | 329 cm (130 in) | (Poland) PGE Skra Bełchatów |
| 11 | Fabian Drzyzga | 3 January 1990 | 1.96 m (6 ft 5 in) | 90 kg (200 lb) | 325 cm (128 in) | 304 cm (120 in) | (Poland) Asseco Resovia Rzeszów |
| 13 | Michał Kubiak | 23 February 1988 | 1.91 m (6 ft 3 in) | 80 kg (180 lb) | 328 cm (129 in) | 312 cm (123 in) | (Poland) Jastrzębski Węgiel |
| 16 | Krzysztof Ignaczak | 15 May 1978 | 1.88 m (6 ft 2 in) | 86 kg (190 lb) | 330 cm (130 in) | 315 cm (124 in) | (Poland) Asseco Resovia Rzeszów |
| 17 | Paweł Zatorski | 21 June 1990 | 1.84 m (6 ft 0 in) | 73 kg (161 lb) | 328 cm (129 in) | 304 cm (120 in) | (Poland) PGE Skra Bełchatów |
| 18 | Marcin Możdżonek | 9 February 1985 | 2.11 m (6 ft 11 in) | 93 kg (205 lb) | 358 cm (141 in) | 338 cm (133 in) | (Poland) ZAKSA Kędzierzyn-Koźle |
| 20 | Mateusz Mika | 21 January 1991 | 2.06 m (6 ft 9 in) | 86 kg (190 lb) | 352 cm (139 in) | 320 cm (130 in) | (France) Montpellier UC |
| 21 | Rafał Buszek | 28 April 1987 | 1.94 m (6 ft 4 in) | 81 kg (179 lb) | 345 cm (136 in) | 327 cm (129 in) | (Poland) Indykpol AZS Olsztyn |

=== Argentina ===
The following is the Argentine roster in the 2014 FIVB Men's Volleyball World Championship.

Head coach: Julio Velasco

| No. | Name | Date of birth | Height | Weight | Spike | Block | 2014 club |
|---|---|---|---|---|---|---|---|
| 1 | Santiago Darraidou | 24 November 1980 | 1.94 m (6 ft 4 in) | 95 kg (209 lb) | 345 cm (136 in) | 355 cm (140 in) | (Argentina) Sarmiento Santana Textiles |
| 2 | Javier Filardi (c) | 7 February 1980 | 1.90 m (6 ft 3 in) | 89 kg (196 lb) | 340 cm (130 in) | 318 cm (125 in) | (Argentina) UPCN San Juan |
| 3 | Gustavo Porporatto | 7 May 1981 | 1.99 m (6 ft 6 in) | 94 kg (207 lb) | 365 cm (144 in) | 260 cm (100 in) | (Argentina) La Unión de Formosa |
| 4 | Sebastián Garrocq | 27 November 1979 | 1.70 m (5 ft 7 in) | 63 kg (139 lb) | 320 cm (130 in) | 302 cm (119 in) | (Argentina) UPCN San Juan |
| 5 | Nicolás Uriarte | 21 March 1990 | 1.92 m (6 ft 4 in) | 82 kg (181 lb) | 346 cm (136 in) | 326 cm (128 in) | (Poland) PGE Skra Bełchatów |
| 7 | Facundo Conte | 25 August 1989 | 1.98 m (6 ft 6 in) | 90 kg (200 lb) | 350 cm (140 in) | 326 cm (128 in) | (Poland) PGE Skra Bełchatów |
| 9 | Rodrigo Quiroga | 23 March 1987 | 1.90 m (6 ft 3 in) | 86 kg (190 lb) | 345 cm (136 in) | 321 cm (126 in) | (Brazil) VBCE Maringá |
| 10 | José Luis González | 27 December 1984 | 2.06 m (6 ft 9 in) | 97 kg (214 lb) | 350 cm (140 in) | 333 cm (131 in) | (Poland) BBTS Bielsko-Biała |
| 11 | Sebastián Solé | 12 June 1991 | 2.02 m (6 ft 8 in) | 88 kg (194 lb) | 350 cm (140 in) | 328 cm (129 in) | (Italy) Diatec Trentino |
| 14 | Pablo Crer | 12 June 1989 | 2.05 m (6 ft 9 in) | 78 kg (172 lb) | 350 cm (140 in) | 330 cm (130 in) | (Italy) Tonno Callipo Vibo Valentia |
| 15 | Luciano De Cecco | 2 June 1988 | 1.94 m (6 ft 4 in) | 89 kg (196 lb) | 333 cm (131 in) | 315 cm (124 in) | (Italy) Copra Elior Piacenza |
| 16 | Martín Ramos | 26 August 1991 | 1.97 m (6 ft 6 in) | 95 kg (209 lb) | 340 cm (130 in) | 315 cm (124 in) | (Argentina) UPCN San Juan |
| 20 | Alejandro Toro | 20 July 1989 | 1.90 m (6 ft 3 in) | 88 kg (194 lb) | 326 cm (128 in) | 308 cm (121 in) | (Argentina) Lomas Vóley |
| 21 | Sebastián Closter | 13 May 1989 | 1.80 m (5 ft 11 in) | 66 kg (146 lb) | 296 cm (117 in) | 278 cm (109 in) | (Argentina) Club Ciudad de Bolívar |

=== Serbia ===
The following is the Serbian roster in the 2014 FIVB Men's Volleyball World Championship.

Head coach: (Montenegro) Igor Kolaković

| No. | Name | Date of birth | Height | Weight | Spike | Block | 2014 club |
|---|---|---|---|---|---|---|---|
| 1 | Nikola Kovačević | 14 February 1983 | 1.93 m (6 ft 4 in) | 78 kg (172 lb) | 350 cm (140 in) | 340 cm (130 in) | (Italy) Calzedonia Verona |
| 2 | Uroš Kovačević | 6 May 1993 | 1.97 m (6 ft 6 in) | 90 kg (200 lb) | 340 cm (130 in) | 310 cm (120 in) | (Italy) Casa Modena |
| 3 | Marko Ivović | 22 December 1990 | 1.92 m (6 ft 4 in) | 89 kg (196 lb) | 350 cm (140 in) | 330 cm (130 in) | (France) Paris Volley |
| 4 | Nemanja Petrić | 28 July 1987 | 2.02 m (6 ft 8 in) | 86 kg (190 lb) | 333 cm (131 in) | 320 cm (130 in) | (Italy) Sir Safety Perugia |
| 5 | Vlado Petković | 6 January 1983 | 1.98 m (6 ft 6 in) | 97 kg (214 lb) | 325 cm (128 in) | 318 cm (125 in) | (Iran) Shahrdari Urmia |
| 7 | Dragan Stanković (c) | 18 October 1985 | 2.05 m (6 ft 9 in) | 80 kg (180 lb) | 343 cm (135 in) | 333 cm (131 in) | (Italy) Lube Banca Marche Macerata |
| 9 | Nikola Jovović | 13 February 1992 | 1.97 m (6 ft 6 in) | 75 kg (165 lb) | 335 cm (132 in) | 315 cm (124 in) | (Germany) VfB Friedrichshafen |
| 10 | Miloš Nikić | 31 March 1986 | 1.94 m (6 ft 4 in) | 79 kg (174 lb) | 350 cm (140 in) | 330 cm (130 in) | (Russia) Gubernia Nizhniy Novgorod |
| 14 | Aleksandar Atanasijević | 4 September 1991 | 2.00 m (6 ft 7 in) | 92 kg (203 lb) | 350 cm (140 in) | 329 cm (130 in) | (Italy) Sir Safety Perugia |
| 15 | Saša Starović | 19 October 1988 | 2.07 m (6 ft 9 in) | 89 kg (196 lb) | 335 cm (132 in) | 321 cm (126 in) | (Italy) Andreoli Latina |
| 17 | Neven Majstorović | 17 March 1989 | 1.92 m (6 ft 4 in) | 83 kg (183 lb) | 335 cm (132 in) | 315 cm (124 in) | (Serbia) Partizan Vizura Beograd |
| 18 | Marko Podraščanin | 29 August 1987 | 2.04 m (6 ft 8 in) | 92 kg (203 lb) | 343 cm (135 in) | 326 cm (128 in) | (Italy) Lube Banca Marche Macerata |
| 19 | Nikola Rosić | 5 August 1984 | 1.92 m (6 ft 4 in) | 85 kg (187 lb) | 328 cm (129 in) | 315 cm (124 in) | (Switzerland) Energy Investments Lugano |
| 20 | Srećko Lisinac | 17 May 1992 | 2.05 m (6 ft 9 in) | 79 kg (174 lb) | 345 cm (136 in) | 335 cm (132 in) | (Germany) Berlin Recycling Volleys |

=== Australia ===
The following is the Australian roster in the 2014 FIVB Men's Volleyball World Championship.

Head coach: (Argentina) Jon Uriarte

| No. | Name | Date of birth | Height | Weight | Spike | Block | 2014 club |
|---|---|---|---|---|---|---|---|
| 1 | Aidan Zingel (c) | 19 November 1990 | 2.07 m (6 ft 9 in) | 100 kg (220 lb) | 361 cm (142 in) | 346 cm (136 in) | (Italy) Calzedonia Verona |
| 3 | Nathan Roberts | 17 February 1986 | 1.99 m (6 ft 6 in) | 90 kg (200 lb) | 342 cm (135 in) | 328 cm (129 in) | (Switzerland) Energy Investments Lugano |
| 5 | Travis Passier | 26 April 1989 | 2.06 m (6 ft 9 in) | 99 kg (218 lb) | 351 cm (138 in) | 340 cm (130 in) | (Australia) Australian Institute of Sport |
| 6 | Thomas Edgar | 21 June 1989 | 2.12 m (6 ft 11 in) | 106 kg (234 lb) | 357 cm (141 in) | 341 cm (134 in) | (South Korea) LIG Insurance Greaters |
| 7 | Harrison Peacock | 31 January 1991 | 1.92 m (6 ft 4 in) | 87 kg (192 lb) | 353 cm (139 in) | 339 cm (133 in) | (Australia) Australian Institute of Sport |
| 9 | Adam White | 8 November 1989 | 2.03 m (6 ft 8 in) | 89 kg (196 lb) | 351 cm (138 in) | 336 cm (132 in) | (Italy) Calzedonia Verona |
| 11 | Luke Perry | 20 November 1995 | 1.80 m (5 ft 11 in) | 75 kg (165 lb) | 330 cm (130 in) | 315 cm (124 in) | (Australia) Australian Institute of Sport |
| 12 | Nehemiah Mote | 21 June 1993 | 2.04 m (6 ft 8 in) | 91 kg (201 lb) | 362 cm (143 in) | 354 cm (139 in) | (Australia) Australian Institute of Sport |
| 14 | Grigory Sukochev | 18 February 1988 | 1.96 m (6 ft 5 in) | 86 kg (190 lb) | 340 cm (130 in) | 329 cm (130 in) | (Latvia) Klubs "Laze-R" |
| 15 | Thomas Douglas-Powell | 16 September 1992 | 1.94 m (6 ft 4 in) | 82 kg (181 lb) | 356 cm (140 in) | 332 cm (131 in) | (Canada) University of Winnipeg |
| 16 | Luke Smith | 30 August 1990 | 2.04 m (6 ft 8 in) | 95 kg (209 lb) | 360 cm (140 in) | 342 cm (135 in) | (Czech Republic) VO Příbram |
| 17 | Paul Carroll | 16 May 1986 | 2.07 m (6 ft 9 in) | 98 kg (216 lb) | 354 cm (139 in) | 340 cm (130 in) | (Germany) Berlin Recycling Volleys |

=== Cameroon ===
The following is the Cameroonian roster in the 2014 FIVB Men's Volleyball World Championship.

Head coach: (Germany) Peter Nonnenbroich

| No. | Name | Date of birth | Height | Weight | Spike | Block | 2014 club |
|---|---|---|---|---|---|---|---|
| 1 | Olivier Nongni Zanguim Mefani | 9 February 1987 | 2.00 m (6 ft 7 in) | 110 kg (240 lb) | 355 cm (140 in) | 330 cm (130 in) | (Cameroon) Cameroun Sports VB |
| 2 | Ahmed Awal Mbutngam | 23 April 1990 | 1.92 m (6 ft 4 in) | 84 kg (185 lb) | 340 cm (130 in) | 325 cm (128 in) | (Cameroon) FAP Yaoundé |
| 3 | Georges Kari Adeke | 13 July 1981 | 1.91 m (6 ft 3 in) | 88 kg (194 lb) | 335 cm (132 in) | 315 cm (124 in) | (France) Mende Volley Lozère |
| 6 | Sem Dolegombai | 18 May 1990 | 2.00 m (6 ft 7 in) | 95 kg (209 lb) | 350 cm (140 in) | 335 cm (132 in) | (Cameroon) FAP Yaoundé |
| 7 | Jean Patrice Ndaki Mboulet (c) | 5 May 1979 | 2.01 m (6 ft 7 in) | 108 kg (238 lb) | 352 cm (139 in) | 330 cm (130 in) | Kuwait SC |
| 8 | Jean Junior Nyabeye | 1 January 1989 | 1.90 m (6 ft 3 in) | 80 kg (180 lb) | 340 cm (130 in) | 320 cm (130 in) | (France) EV Beaucourt-Sochaux |
| 9 | Hervé Kofane Boyomo | 14 September 1988 | 2.06 m (6 ft 9 in) | 95 kg (209 lb) | 360 cm (140 in) | 335 cm (132 in) | (Cameroon) Bafia VB |
| 10 | Maliki Moussa | 2 February 1978 | 2.06 m (6 ft 9 in) | 97 kg (214 lb) | 350 cm (140 in) | 333 cm (131 in) | (France) Vendée VB |
| 14 | Nathan Wounembaina | 22 November 1984 | 1.98 m (6 ft 6 in) | 83 kg (183 lb) | 360 cm (140 in) | 345 cm (136 in) | (France) Chaumont VB |
| 15 | Yvan Bitjaa | 25 August 1991 | 2.13 m (7 ft 0 in) | 92 kg (203 lb) | 360 cm (140 in) | 342 cm (135 in) | (Cameroon) FAP Yaoundé |
| 16 | Alain Fossi Kamto | 4 November 1980 | 1.83 m (6 ft 0 in) | 81 kg (179 lb) | 333 cm (131 in) | 302 cm (119 in) | (France) VBP Niort |
| 17 | Serge Patrice Ag | 22 March 1974 | 1.81 m (5 ft 11 in) | 82 kg (181 lb) | 320 cm (130 in) | 295 cm (116 in) | (Cameroon) Port de Douala |
| 18 | David Feughouo | 5 May 1989 | 2.06 m (6 ft 9 in) | 95 kg (209 lb) | 350 cm (140 in) | 330 cm (130 in) | (France) Nancy Volley |
| 19 | Frédéric Bassige Ba Bindop | 13 June 1984 | 1.83 m (6 ft 0 in) | 81 kg (179 lb) | 325 cm (128 in) | 300 cm (120 in) | (Cameroon) FAP Yaoundé |

=== Venezuela ===
The following is the Venezuelan roster in the 2014 FIVB Men's Volleyball World Championship.

Head coach: (Italy) Vincenzo Nacci

| No. | Name | Date of birth | Height | Weight | Spike | Block | 2014 club |
|---|---|---|---|---|---|---|---|
| 1 | Régulo Briceño | 13 February 1989 | 1.75 m (5 ft 9 in) | 85 kg (187 lb) | 332 cm (131 in) | 327 cm (129 in) | (Venezuela) Aragua VC |
| 3 | Fernando González | 30 June 1989 | 1.94 m (6 ft 4 in) | 84 kg (185 lb) | 333 cm (131 in) | 328 cm (129 in) | (Argentina) Chubut Voley |
| 4 | Héctor Mata | 27 January 1993 | 1.79 m (5 ft 10 in) | 77 kg (170 lb) | 310 cm (120 in) | 304 cm (120 in) | (Venezuela) Deportivo Anzoátegui |
| 5 | Emerson Rodríguez | 2 February 1993 | 2.02 m (6 ft 8 in) | 90 kg (200 lb) | 338 cm (133 in) | 333 cm (131 in) | (Venezuela) Distrito Capital |
| 6 | Carlos Páez | 9 November 1991 | 1.92 m (6 ft 4 in) | 82 kg (181 lb) | 342 cm (135 in) | 337 cm (133 in) | (Venezuela) Industriales de Valencia |
| 8 | Héctor Salerno | 18 June 1991 | 1.96 m (6 ft 5 in) | 76 kg (168 lb) | 358 cm (141 in) | 351 cm (138 in) | (Venezuela) Aragua VC |
| 9 | José Carrasco | 20 May 1989 | 1.95 m (6 ft 5 in) | 89 kg (196 lb) | 345 cm (136 in) | 347 cm (137 in) | (Venezuela) Yaracuy |
| 10 | Kervin Piñerúa (c) | 22 February 1991 | 1.91 m (6 ft 3 in) | 85 kg (187 lb) | 339 cm (133 in) | 334 cm (131 in) | (Venezuela) Vikingos de Miranda |
| 11 | Ernando Gómez | 30 July 1982 | 1.95 m (6 ft 5 in) | 90 kg (200 lb) | 355 cm (140 in) | 350 cm (140 in) | (Japan) Toyoda Gosei Trefuerza |
| 12 | Jhoser Contreras | 4 April 1991 | 1.91 m (6 ft 3 in) | 84 kg (185 lb) | 340 cm (130 in) | 334 cm (131 in) | (Venezuela) Zulia |
| 13 | Jesús Chourio | 2 January 1991 | 2.01 m (6 ft 7 in) | 88 kg (194 lb) | 345 cm (136 in) | 340 cm (130 in) | (Venezuela) Zulia |
| 14 | Máximo Montoya | 26 June 1989 | 1.98 m (6 ft 6 in) | 86 kg (190 lb) | 347 cm (137 in) | 343 cm (135 in) | (Venezuela) Apure |
| 17 | Daniel Escobar | 10 July 1990 | 2.02 m (6 ft 8 in) | 90 kg (200 lb) | 350 cm (140 in) | 345 cm (136 in) | (Venezuela) Vikingos de Miranda |
| 18 | Fredy Cedeño | 10 September 1981 | 2.05 m (6 ft 9 in) | 97 kg (214 lb) | 358 cm (141 in) | 335 cm (132 in) | (Spain) CV Almería |

== Pool B ==
=== Brazil ===
The following is the Brazilian roster in the 2014 FIVB Men's Volleyball World Championship.

Head coach: Bernardo Rezende

| No. | Name | Date of birth | Height | Weight | Spike | Block | 2014 club |
|---|---|---|---|---|---|---|---|
| 1 | Bruno Rezende (c) | 2 July 1986 | 1.90 m (6 ft 3 in) | 76 kg (168 lb) | 323 cm (127 in) | 302 cm (119 in) | (Italy) Casa Modena |
| 3 | Éder Carbonera | 19 October 1983 | 2.04 m (6 ft 8 in) | 101 kg (223 lb) | 350 cm (140 in) | 330 cm (130 in) | (Brazil) Sada Cruzeiro Vôlei |
| 4 | Wallace de Souza | 26 June 1987 | 1.98 m (6 ft 6 in) | 87 kg (192 lb) | 344 cm (135 in) | 318 cm (125 in) | (Brazil) Sada Cruzeiro Vôlei |
| 5 | Sidnei Santos | 9 July 1982 | 2.03 m (6 ft 8 in) | 98 kg (216 lb) | 344 cm (135 in) | 318 cm (125 in) | (Brazil) SESI São Paulo |
| 6 | Leandro Vissotto Neves | 30 April 1983 | 2.12 m (6 ft 11 in) | 97 kg (214 lb) | 370 cm (150 in) | 345 cm (136 in) | (South Korea) KEPCO Vixtorm |
| 8 | Murilo Endres | 3 May 1981 | 1.90 m (6 ft 3 in) | 76 kg (168 lb) | 343 cm (135 in) | 319 cm (126 in) | (Brazil) SESI São Paulo |
| 9 | Renan Buiatti | 10 January 1990 | 2.12 m (6 ft 11 in) | 85 kg (187 lb) | 330 cm (130 in) | 314 cm (124 in) | (Brazil) São Bernardo Vôlei |
| 10 | Ricardo Lucarelli | 14 February 1992 | 1.95 m (6 ft 5 in) | 79 kg (174 lb) | 338 cm (133 in) | 308 cm (121 in) | (Brazil) SESI São Paulo |
| 11 | Felipe Silva | 25 August 1990 | 1.88 m (6 ft 2 in) | 77 kg (170 lb) | 302 cm (119 in) | 297 cm (117 in) | (Brazil) São Bernardo Vôlei |
| 12 | Luiz Felipe Fonteles | 19 June 1984 | 1.96 m (6 ft 5 in) | 89 kg (196 lb) | 330 cm (130 in) | 320 cm (130 in) | (Turkey) Fenerbahçe Grundig Istanbul |
| 16 | Lucas Saatkamp | 6 March 1986 | 2.09 m (6 ft 10 in) | 101 kg (223 lb) | 340 cm (130 in) | 321 cm (126 in) | (Brazil) SESI São Paulo |
| 18 | Maurício Borges Silva | 4 February 1989 | 1.99 m (6 ft 6 in) | 99 kg (218 lb) | 335 cm (132 in) | 315 cm (124 in) | (Brazil) Minas TC |
| 19 | Mário Pedreira | 3 May 1982 | 1.92 m (6 ft 4 in) | 91 kg (201 lb) | 330 cm (130 in) | 321 cm (126 in) | (Brazil) RJ Vôlei |
| 20 | Raphael Oliveira | 14 June 1979 | 1.90 m (6 ft 3 in) | 82 kg (181 lb) | 330 cm (130 in) | 306 cm (120 in) | (Turkey) Halkbank Ankara |

=== Cuba ===
The following is the Cuban roster in the 2014 FIVB Men's Volleyball World Championship.

Head coach: Rodolfo Sánchez

| No. | Name | Date of birth | Height | Weight | Spike | Block | 2014 club |
|---|---|---|---|---|---|---|---|
| 2 | Inovel Romero | 28 January 1995 | 1.97 m (6 ft 6 in) | 80 kg (180 lb) | 350 cm (140 in) | 335 cm (132 in) | (Cuba) Ciego de Ávila |
| 3 | Ricardo Calvo | 2 October 1996 | 1.93 m (6 ft 4 in) | 74 kg (163 lb) | 343 cm (135 in) | 334 cm (131 in) | (Cuba) Villa Clara |
| 4 | Javier Jiménez | 16 November 1989 | 1.98 m (6 ft 6 in) | 89 kg (196 lb) | 352 cm (139 in) | 345 cm (136 in) | (Cuba) Matanzas |
| 5 | Leandro Macías | 13 February 1990 | 1.92 m (6 ft 4 in) | 70 kg (150 lb) | 325 cm (128 in) | 318 cm (125 in) | Santiago de Cuba |
| 6 | Keibel Gutiérrez | 6 May 1987 | 1.78 m (5 ft 10 in) | 80 kg (180 lb) | 305 cm (120 in) | 295 cm (116 in) | (Cuba) Villa Clara |
| 8 | Rolando Cepeda (c) | 13 March 1989 | 1.98 m (6 ft 6 in) | 77 kg (170 lb) | 359 cm (141 in) | 344 cm (135 in) | (Cuba) Sancti Spíritus |
| 9 | Liván Osoria | 5 February 1994 | 2.01 m (6 ft 7 in) | 96 kg (212 lb) | 345 cm (136 in) | 325 cm (128 in) | Santiago de Cuba |
| 12 | Abrahan Alfonso Gavilán | 23 February 1995 | 1.97 m (6 ft 6 in) | 72 kg (159 lb) | 343 cm (135 in) | 320 cm (130 in) | (Cuba) La Habana |
| 13 | David Fiel | 28 August 1993 | 2.04 m (6 ft 8 in) | 93 kg (205 lb) | 374 cm (147 in) | 369 cm (145 in) | (Cuba) La Habana |
| 16 | Isbel Mesa | 2 June 1989 | 2.04 m (6 ft 8 in) | 89 kg (196 lb) | 358 cm (141 in) | 331 cm (130 in) | (Cuba) La Habana |
| 17 | Félix Chapman | 5 October 1996 | 1.98 m (6 ft 6 in) | 84 kg (185 lb) | 350 cm (140 in) | 330 cm (130 in) | (Cuba) Mayabeque |
| 20 | Osmany Uriarte | 4 June 1995 | 1.97 m (6 ft 6 in) | 81 kg (179 lb) | 352 cm (139 in) | 348 cm (137 in) | (Cuba) Sancti Spíritus |

=== Germany ===
The following is the German roster in the 2014 FIVB Men's Volleyball World Championship.

Head coach: (Belgium) Vital Heynen

| No. | Name | Date of birth | Height | Weight | Spike | Block | 2014 club |
|---|---|---|---|---|---|---|---|
| 1 | Christian Fromm | 15 August 1990 | 2.04 m (6 ft 8 in) | 99 kg (218 lb) | 345 cm (136 in) | 324 cm (128 in) | (Italy) Sir Safety Perugia |
| 2 | Markus Steuerwald | 7 March 1989 | 1.82 m (6 ft 0 in) | 85 kg (187 lb) | 340 cm (130 in) | 318 cm (125 in) | (France) Paris Volley |
| 3 | Sebastian Schwarz | 2 October 1985 | 1.97 m (6 ft 6 in) | 94 kg (207 lb) | 340 cm (130 in) | 325 cm (128 in) | (Germany) Generali Unterhaching |
| 5 | Sebastian Kühner | 15 March 1987 | 2.03 m (6 ft 8 in) | 91 kg (201 lb) | 341 cm (134 in) | 332 cm (131 in) | (Germany) Berlin Recycling Volleys |
| 6 | Denys Kaliberda | 24 June 1990 | 1.93 m (6 ft 4 in) | 95 kg (209 lb) | 343 cm (135 in) | 314 cm (124 in) | (Poland) Jastrzębski Węgiel |
| 7 | Dirk Westphal | 31 January 1986 | 2.03 m (6 ft 8 in) | 92 kg (203 lb) | 354 cm (139 in) | 331 cm (130 in) | (Poland) Czarni Radom |
| 8 | Marcus Böhme | 25 August 1985 | 2.11 m (6 ft 11 in) | 116 kg (256 lb) | 360 cm (140 in) | 330 cm (130 in) | (Germany) Generali Unterhaching |
| 9 | György Grozer | 27 November 1984 | 2.00 m (6 ft 7 in) | 102 kg (225 lb) | 374 cm (147 in) | 345 cm (136 in) | (Russia) Belogorie Belgorod |
| 10 | Jochen Schöps (c) | 8 October 1983 | 2.00 m (6 ft 7 in) | 100 kg (220 lb) | 360 cm (140 in) | 335 cm (132 in) | (Poland) Asseco Resovia Rzeszów |
| 11 | Lukas Kampa | 29 November 1986 | 1.96 m (6 ft 5 in) | 90 kg (200 lb) | 335 cm (132 in) | 320 cm (130 in) | (Poland) Czarni Radom |
| 12 | Ferdinand Tille | 8 December 1988 | 1.85 m (6 ft 1 in) | 75 kg (165 lb) | 338 cm (133 in) | 316 cm (124 in) | (Poland) PGE Skra Bełchatów |
| 15 | Tim Broshog | 2 December 1987 | 2.05 m (6 ft 9 in) | 112 kg (247 lb) | 340 cm (130 in) | 332 cm (131 in) | (Belgium) Noliko Maaseik |
| 16 | Max Günthör | 9 August 1985 | 2.07 m (6 ft 9 in) | 93 kg (205 lb) | 350 cm (140 in) | 325 cm (128 in) | (Germany) VfB Friedrichshafen |
| 18 | Michael Andrei | 6 August 1985 | 2.10 m (6 ft 11 in) | 98 kg (216 lb) | 345 cm (136 in) | 340 cm (130 in) | (Belgium) Topvolley Antwerpen |

=== Tunisia ===
The following is the Tunisian roster in the 2014 FIVB Men's Volleyball World Championship.

Head coach: Fethi Mkaouar

| No. | Name | Date of birth | Height | Weight | Spike | Block | 2014 club |
|---|---|---|---|---|---|---|---|
| 2 | Ahmed Kadhi | 19 April 1989 | 1.99 m (6 ft 6 in) | 99 kg (218 lb) | 345 cm (136 in) | 318 cm (125 in) | (Tunisia) ES Sahel |
| 4 | Marouen Garci | 21 March 1988 | 1.97 m (6 ft 6 in) | 87 kg (192 lb) | 317 cm (125 in) | 308 cm (121 in) | (Tunisia) ES Sahel |
| 5 | Samir Sellami (c) | 13 July 1977 | 1.95 m (6 ft 5 in) | 93 kg (205 lb) | 320 cm (130 in) | 308 cm (121 in) | (Tunisia) CS Sfaxien |
| 6 | Mohamed Ali Ben Othmen Miladi | 12 May 1991 | 1.88 m (6 ft 2 in) | 73 kg (161 lb) | 315 cm (124 in) | 289 cm (114 in) | (Tunisia) CO Kelibia |
| 7 | Elyes Karamosli | 22 August 1989 | 1.98 m (6 ft 6 in) | 99 kg (218 lb) | 345 cm (136 in) | 320 cm (130 in) | (Tunisia) ES Tunis |
| 10 | Hamza Nagga | 29 May 1990 | 1.91 m (6 ft 3 in) | 84 kg (185 lb) | 326 cm (128 in) | 311 cm (122 in) | (Tunisia) ES Sahel |
| 11 | Ismail Moalla | 30 January 1990 | 1.95 m (6 ft 5 in) | 84 kg (185 lb) | 324 cm (128 in) | 308 cm (121 in) | (Tunisia) CS Sfaxien |
| 12 | Anouer Taouerghi | 17 August 1983 | 1.78 m (5 ft 10 in) | 74 kg (163 lb) | 302 cm (119 in) | 292 cm (115 in) | (Tunisia) CS Sfaxien |
| 15 | Hichem Kaabi | 13 September 1986 | 1.94 m (6 ft 4 in) | 84 kg (185 lb) | 360 cm (140 in) | 345 cm (136 in) | (Tunisia) ES Tunis |
| 16 | Khaled Ben Slimene | 14 December 1994 | 1.93 m (6 ft 4 in) | 78 kg (172 lb) | 290 cm (110 in) | 285 cm (112 in) | (Tunisia) CO Kelibia |
| 20 | Omar Agrebi | 26 August 1992 | 2.05 m (6 ft 9 in) | 82 kg (181 lb) | 325 cm (128 in) | 310 cm (120 in) | (Tunisia) CS Sfaxien |
| 21 | Nabil Miladi | 28 February 1988 | 1.96 m (6 ft 5 in) | 73 kg (161 lb) | 355 cm (140 in) | 340 cm (130 in) | (Tunisia) ES Tunis |

=== South Korea ===
The following is the South Korean roster in the 2014 FIVB Men's Volleyball World Championship.

Head coach: Park Ki-won

| No. | Name | Date of birth | Height | Weight | Spike | Block | 2014 club |
|---|---|---|---|---|---|---|---|
| 1 | Song Myung-geun | 12 March 1993 | 1.95 m (6 ft 5 in) | 85 kg (187 lb) | 315 cm (124 in) | 305 cm (120 in) | (South Korea) Rush & Cash Vespid |
| 2 | Han Sun-soo (c) | 16 December 1985 | 1.89 m (6 ft 2 in) | 80 kg (180 lb) | 310 cm (120 in) | 297 cm (117 in) | Unattached |
| 4 | Shin Yung-suk | 4 October 1986 | 1.98 m (6 ft 6 in) | 90 kg (200 lb) | 335 cm (132 in) | 325 cm (128 in) | (South Korea) Sangmu |
| 6 | Lee Min-gyu | 3 December 1992 | 1.94 m (6 ft 4 in) | 78 kg (172 lb) | 305 cm (120 in) | 295 cm (116 in) | (South Korea) Rush & Cash Vespid |
| 8 | Park Sang-ha | 4 April 1986 | 1.93 m (6 ft 4 in) | 95 kg (209 lb) | 343 cm (135 in) | 314 cm (124 in) | (South Korea) Sangmu |
| 9 | Kwak Seung-suk | 23 March 1988 | 1.90 m (6 ft 3 in) | 81 kg (179 lb) | 325 cm (128 in) | 320 cm (130 in) | (South Korea) Korean Air Jumbos |
| 10 | Bu Yong-chan | 30 November 1989 | 1.75 m (5 ft 9 in) | 65 kg (143 lb) | 290 cm (110 in) | 284 cm (112 in) | (South Korea) LIG Insurance Greaters |
| 11 | Choi Min-ho | 28 April 1988 | 1.98 m (6 ft 6 in) | 86 kg (190 lb) | 330 cm (130 in) | 312 cm (123 in) | (South Korea) Hyundai Capital Skywalkers |
| 12 | Jeon Kwang-in | 18 September 1991 | 1.94 m (6 ft 4 in) | 82 kg (181 lb) | 310 cm (120 in) | 300 cm (120 in) | (South Korea) KEPCO Vixtorm |
| 13 | Park Chul-woo | 25 July 1985 | 1.98 m (6 ft 6 in) | 88 kg (194 lb) | 332 cm (131 in) | 319 cm (126 in) | (South Korea) Samsung Fire Bluefangs |
| 17 | Seo Jae-duck | 21 July 1989 | 1.95 m (6 ft 5 in) | 98 kg (216 lb) | 315 cm (124 in) | 305 cm (120 in) | (South Korea) KEPCO Vixtorm |
| 19 | Jeong Min-su | 5 October 1991 | 1.78 m (5 ft 10 in) | 75 kg (165 lb) | 270 cm (110 in) | 250 cm (98 in) | (South Korea) Woori Card Hansae |

=== Finland ===
The following is the Finnish roster in the 2014 FIVB Men's Volleyball World Championship.

Head coach: Tuomas Sammelvuo

| No. | Name | Date of birth | Height | Weight | Spike | Block | 2014 club |
|---|---|---|---|---|---|---|---|
| 2 | Eemi Tervaportti | 26 July 1989 | 1.93 m (6 ft 4 in) | 73 kg (161 lb) | 338 cm (133 in) | 317 cm (125 in) | (Belgium) Knack Roeselare |
| 3 | Mikko Esko | 3 September 1978 | 1.98 m (6 ft 6 in) | 89 kg (196 lb) | 331 cm (130 in) | 319 cm (126 in) | (Russia) Gubernia Nizhniy Novgorod |
| 4 | Lauri Kerminen | 18 January 1993 | 1.82 m (6 ft 0 in) | 70 kg (150 lb) | 320 cm (130 in) | 290 cm (110 in) | (France) Nantes RMV |
| 5 | Antti Siltala (c) | 14 March 1984 | 1.93 m (6 ft 4 in) | 90 kg (200 lb) | 348 cm (137 in) | 330 cm (130 in) | (France) GFC Ajaccio |
| 6 | Niklas Seppänen | 30 June 1993 | 1.92 m (6 ft 4 in) | 82 kg (181 lb) | 335 cm (132 in) | 320 cm (130 in) | (Finland) Kokkolan Tiikerit |
| 9 | Tommi Siirilä | 5 August 1993 | 2.03 m (6 ft 8 in) | 98 kg (216 lb) | 340 cm (130 in) | 325 cm (128 in) | (Finland) Kokkolan Tiikerit |
| 10 | Urpo Sivula | 15 March 1988 | 1.95 m (6 ft 5 in) | 100 kg (220 lb) | 350 cm (140 in) | 330 cm (130 in) | (Turkey) Arkas Izmir |
| 11 | Timo Tolvanen | 8 November 1977 | 1.83 m (6 ft 0 in) | 70 kg (150 lb) | 320 cm (130 in) | 310 cm (120 in) | (Finland) LEKA Volley |
| 12 | Olli Kunnari | 2 February 1982 | 1.97 m (6 ft 6 in) | 85 kg (187 lb) | 342 cm (135 in) | 315 cm (124 in) | (Finland) Vammalan Lentopallo |
| 13 | Mikko Oivanen | 26 May 1986 | 1.98 m (6 ft 6 in) | 92 kg (203 lb) | 360 cm (140 in) | 320 cm (130 in) | (Poland) Czarni Radom |
| 14 | Konstantin Shumov | 15 February 1985 | 2.05 m (6 ft 9 in) | 101 kg (223 lb) | 351 cm (138 in) | 331 cm (130 in) | (Germany) Generali Unterhaching |
| 15 | Matti Oivanen | 26 May 1986 | 1.98 m (6 ft 6 in) | 90 kg (200 lb) | 355 cm (140 in) | 320 cm (130 in) | (Poland) Indykpol AZS Olsztyn |
| 16 | Olli-Pekka Ojansivu | 31 December 1987 | 1.97 m (6 ft 6 in) | 90 kg (200 lb) | 344 cm (135 in) | 325 cm (128 in) | (Finland) Kokkolan Tiikerit |
| 18 | Jukka Lehtonen | 22 February 1982 | 1.97 m (6 ft 6 in) | 90 kg (200 lb) | 346 cm (136 in) | 325 cm (128 in) | (Switzerland) Energy Investments Lugano |

== Pool C ==
=== Russia ===
The following is the Russian roster in the 2014 FIVB Men's Volleyball World Championship.

Head coach: Andrey Voronkov

| No. | Name | Date of birth | Height | Weight | Spike | Block | 2014 club |
|---|---|---|---|---|---|---|---|
| 2 | Sergey Makarov (c) | 28 March 1980 | 1.96 m (6 ft 5 in) | 97 kg (214 lb) | 337 cm (133 in) | 329 cm (130 in) | (Russia) Kuzbass Kemerovo |
| 3 | Nikolay Apalikov | 26 August 1982 | 2.03 m (6 ft 8 in) | 103 kg (227 lb) | 353 cm (139 in) | 344 cm (135 in) | (Russia) Zenit Kazan |
| 5 | Sergey Grankin | 21 January 1985 | 1.95 m (6 ft 5 in) | 96 kg (212 lb) | 351 cm (138 in) | 320 cm (130 in) | (Russia) Dinamo Moscow |
| 7 | Nikolay Pavlov | 22 May 1982 | 1.96 m (6 ft 5 in) | 93 kg (205 lb) | 342 cm (135 in) | 321 cm (126 in) | (Russia) Gubernia Nizhniy Novgorod |
| 8 | Denis Biriukov | 8 December 1988 | 2.02 m (6 ft 8 in) | 93 kg (205 lb) | 352 cm (139 in) | 324 cm (128 in) | (Russia) Dinamo Moscow |
| 9 | Aleksey Spiridonov | 26 June 1988 | 1.96 m (6 ft 5 in) | 96 kg (212 lb) | 347 cm (137 in) | 328 cm (129 in) | (Russia) Zenit Kazan |
| 10 | Sergey Savin | 7 October 1988 | 2.01 m (6 ft 7 in) | 92 kg (203 lb) | 343 cm (135 in) | 325 cm (128 in) | (Russia) Gubernia Nizhniy Novgorod |
| 11 | Andrey Ashchev | 10 May 1983 | 2.02 m (6 ft 8 in) | 105 kg (231 lb) | 350 cm (140 in) | 338 cm (133 in) | (Russia) Zenit Kazan |
| 13 | Dmitriy Muserskiy | 29 October 1988 | 2.18 m (7 ft 2 in) | 104 kg (229 lb) | 375 cm (148 in) | 347 cm (137 in) | (Russia) Belogorie Belogorod |
| 14 | Artem Volvich | 22 January 1990 | 2.08 m (6 ft 10 in) | 96 kg (212 lb) | 350 cm (140 in) | 330 cm (130 in) | (Russia) Lokomotiv Novosibirsk |
| 15 | Dmitriy Ilinikh | 31 January 1987 | 2.01 m (6 ft 7 in) | 92 kg (203 lb) | 338 cm (133 in) | 330 cm (130 in) | (Russia) Belogorie Belogorod |
| 18 | Pavel Moroz | 26 February 1987 | 2.05 m (6 ft 9 in) | 105 kg (231 lb) | 352 cm (139 in) | 343 cm (135 in) | (Russia) Lokomotiv Novosibirsk |
| 20 | Artem Ermakov | 16 March 1982 | 1.88 m (6 ft 2 in) | 80 kg (180 lb) | 323 cm (127 in) | 313 cm (123 in) | (Russia) Dinamo Moscow |
| 21 | Valentin Golubev | 3 May 1992 | 1.90 m (6 ft 3 in) | 70 kg (150 lb) | 310 cm (120 in) | 305 cm (120 in) | (Russia) Lokomotiv Novosibirsk |

=== Bulgaria ===
The following is the Bulgarian roster in the 2014 FIVB Men's Volleyball World Championship.

Head coach: Plamen Konstantinov

| No. | Name | Date of birth | Height | Weight | Spike | Block | 2014 club |
|---|---|---|---|---|---|---|---|
| 3 | Andrey Zhekov | 12 March 1980 | 1.90 m (6 ft 3 in) | 82 kg (181 lb) | 340 cm (130 in) | 326 cm (128 in) | (Italy) Copra Elior Piacenza |
| 4 | Martin Bozhilov | 11 April 1988 | 1.90 m (6 ft 3 in) | 82 kg (181 lb) | 320 cm (130 in) | 305 cm (120 in) | (Bulgaria) Marek Union Ivkoni |
| 5 | Svetoslav Gotsev | 31 August 1990 | 2.05 m (6 ft 9 in) | 97 kg (214 lb) | 358 cm (141 in) | 335 cm (132 in) | (Italy) Calzedonia Verona |
| 6 | Danail Milushev | 3 February 1984 | 2.00 m (6 ft 7 in) | 102 kg (225 lb) | 360 cm (140 in) | 340 cm (130 in) | (France) Toulouse OAC |
| 7 | Miroslav Gradinarov | 10 February 1985 | 2.03 m (6 ft 8 in) | 91 kg (201 lb) | 350 cm (140 in) | 330 cm (130 in) | (Japan) F.C. Tokyo |
| 8 | Todor Skrimov | 9 January 1990 | 1.91 m (6 ft 3 in) | 87 kg (192 lb) | 348 cm (137 in) | 330 cm (130 in) | (Italy) Andreoli Latina |
| 9 | Dobromir Dimitrov | 7 July 1991 | 1.98 m (6 ft 6 in) | 84 kg (185 lb) | 345 cm (136 in) | 335 cm (132 in) | (Bulgaria) CVC Gabrovo |
| 12 | Viktor Yosifov | 16 October 1985 | 2.04 m (6 ft 8 in) | 100 kg (220 lb) | 350 cm (140 in) | 340 cm (130 in) | (Germany) VfB Friedrichshafen |
| 13 | Teodor Salparov | 16 August 1982 | 1.87 m (6 ft 2 in) | 77 kg (170 lb) | 320 cm (130 in) | 305 cm (120 in) | (France) ASUL Lyon Volley-Ball |
| 14 | Teodor Todorov | 1 September 1989 | 2.08 m (6 ft 10 in) | 94 kg (207 lb) | 365 cm (144 in) | 345 cm (136 in) | (Russia) Gazprom-Yugra Surgut |
| 15 | Todor Aleksiev (c) | 21 April 1983 | 2.04 m (6 ft 8 in) | 105 kg (231 lb) | 355 cm (140 in) | 340 cm (130 in) | (Russia) Gazprom-Yugra Surgut |
| 17 | Nikolay Penchev | 22 May 1992 | 1.97 m (6 ft 6 in) | 87 kg (192 lb) | 341 cm (134 in) | 335 cm (132 in) | (Poland) Asseco Resovia Rzeszów |
| 19 | Tsvetan Sokolov | 31 December 1989 | 2.06 m (6 ft 9 in) | 100 kg (220 lb) | 370 cm (150 in) | 350 cm (140 in) | (Italy) Diatec Trentino |
| 22 | Georgi Seganov | 10 June 1993 | 1.98 m (6 ft 6 in) | 83 kg (183 lb) | 335 cm (132 in) | 325 cm (128 in) | (Bulgaria) VC CSKA Sofia |

=== Canada ===
The following is the Canadian roster in the 2014 FIVB Men's Volleyball World Championship.

Head coach: Glenn Hoag

| No. | Name | Date of birth | Height | Weight | Spike | Block | 2014 club |
|---|---|---|---|---|---|---|---|
| 1 | TJ Sanders | 14 December 1991 | 1.91 m (6 ft 3 in) | 81 kg (179 lb) | 326 cm (128 in) | 308 cm (121 in) | (Netherlands) Abiant Lycurgus |
| 2 | John Gordon Perrin | 17 August 1989 | 2.01 m (6 ft 7 in) | 95 kg (209 lb) | 353 cm (139 in) | 329 cm (130 in) | (Turkey) Arkas Izmir |
| 3 | Daniel Lewis | 3 April 1976 | 1.89 m (6 ft 2 in) | 86 kg (190 lb) | 340 cm (130 in) | 325 cm (128 in) | (Poland) ZAKSA Kędzierzyn-Koźle |
| 5 | Rudy Verhoeff | 24 June 1989 | 1.98 m (6 ft 6 in) | 88 kg (194 lb) | 349 cm (137 in) | 317 cm (125 in) | (France) Chaumont VB 52 |
| 6 | Justin Duff | 10 May 1988 | 2.02 m (6 ft 8 in) | 94 kg (207 lb) | 370 cm (150 in) | 335 cm (132 in) | (Indonesia) Jakarta Energy |
| 7 | Dallas Soonias | 25 April 1984 | 2.00 m (6 ft 7 in) | 91 kg (201 lb) | 356 cm (140 in) | 323 cm (127 in) | (China) Fujian |
| 8 | Adam Simac | 9 August 1983 | 2.03 m (6 ft 8 in) | 101 kg (223 lb) | 348 cm (137 in) | 336 cm (132 in) | (Switzerland) Energy Investments Lugano |
| 9 | Dustin Schneider | 27 February 1985 | 1.82 m (6 ft 0 in) | 82 kg (181 lb) | 322 cm (127 in) | 297 cm (117 in) | (Poland) ZAKSA Kędzierzyn-Koźle |
| 10 | Toontje Van Lankvelt | 1 July 1984 | 1.97 m (6 ft 6 in) | 91 kg (201 lb) | 347 cm (137 in) | 317 cm (125 in) | (France) ASUL Lyon Volley-Ball |
| 12 | Gavin Schmitt | 27 January 1986 | 2.08 m (6 ft 10 in) | 106 kg (234 lb) | 372 cm (146 in) | 340 cm (130 in) | (Turkey) Arkas Izmir |
| 15 | Frederic Winters (c) | 25 September 1982 | 1.95 m (6 ft 5 in) | 98 kg (216 lb) | 359 cm (141 in) | 327 cm (129 in) | (China) Beijing |
| 17 | Graham Vigrass | 17 June 1989 | 2.05 m (6 ft 9 in) | 97 kg (214 lb) | 354 cm (139 in) | 330 cm (130 in) | (France) Arago de Sète |
| 18 | Nicholas Hoag | 19 August 1992 | 2.00 m (6 ft 7 in) | 91 kg (201 lb) | 342 cm (135 in) | 322 cm (127 in) | (France) Tours VB |
| 22 | Steven Marshall | 23 November 1989 | 1.89 m (6 ft 2 in) | 79 kg (174 lb) | 350 cm (140 in) | 322 cm (127 in) | Unattached |

=== Egypt ===
The following is the Egyptian roster in the 2014 FIVB Men's Volleyball World Championship.

Head coach: Ibrahim Fakheldin

| No. | Name | Date of birth | Height | Weight | Spike | Block | 2014 club |
|---|---|---|---|---|---|---|---|
| 1 | Saleh Youssef (c) | 25 July 1982 | 1.94 m (6 ft 4 in) | 91 kg (201 lb) | 345 cm (136 in) | 332 cm (131 in) | (Egypt) Zamalek |
| 2 | Islam Abdelkader | 9 February 1994 | 1.94 m (6 ft 4 in) | 85 kg (187 lb) | 319 cm (126 in) | 310 cm (120 in) | (Egypt) El-Gaish |
| 3 | Ahmed El Sayed | 14 January 1991 | 1.84 m (6 ft 0 in) | 84 kg (185 lb) | 325 cm (128 in) | 312 cm (123 in) | (Egypt) Zamalek |
| 4 | Ahmed Abdelhay | 19 August 1984 | 1.97 m (6 ft 6 in) | 87 kg (192 lb) | 342 cm (135 in) | 316 cm (124 in) | (Egypt) Al Ahly |
| 6 | Mamdouh Abdelrehim | 5 August 1989 | 2.07 m (6 ft 9 in) | 90 kg (200 lb) | 338 cm (133 in) | 325 cm (128 in) | (Egypt) Al Ahly |
| 8 | Mohamed Thakil | 12 July 1986 | 1.84 m (6 ft 0 in) | 71 kg (157 lb) | 326 cm (128 in) | 315 cm (124 in) | (Egypt) Al Ahly |
| 9 | Rashad Atia | 2 September 1986 | 2.01 m (6 ft 7 in) | 91 kg (201 lb) | 348 cm (137 in) | 342 cm (135 in) | (Egypt) Zamalek |
| 12 | Hossam Abdalla | 16 February 1988 | 2.03 m (6 ft 8 in) | 97 kg (214 lb) | 343 cm (135 in) | 321 cm (126 in) | (Egypt) Al Ahly |
| 13 | Mohamed Badawy | 11 January 1986 | 1.97 m (6 ft 6 in) | 97 kg (214 lb) | 351 cm (138 in) | 343 cm (135 in) | (Egypt) Zamalek |
| 15 | Ahmed Elkotb | 23 July 1991 | 1.97 m (6 ft 6 in) | 80 kg (180 lb) | 328 cm (129 in) | 318 cm (125 in) | (Egypt) Al Ahly |
| 19 | Mohamed Moawad | 26 August 1987 | 1.94 m (6 ft 4 in) | 90 kg (200 lb) | 321 cm (126 in) | 310 cm (120 in) | (Egypt) Al Ahly |
| 20 | Abd Elhalim | 3 June 1989 | 2.10 m (6 ft 11 in) | 88 kg (194 lb) | 285 cm (112 in) | 270 cm (110 in) | (Egypt) Al Ahly |

=== China ===
The following is the Chinese roster in the 2014 FIVB Men's Volleyball World Championship.

Head coach: Xie Guochen

| No. | Name | Date of birth | Height | Weight | Spike | Block | 2014 club |
|---|---|---|---|---|---|---|---|
| 1 | Chen Longhai | 29 March 1991 | 2.01 m (6 ft 7 in) | 85 kg (187 lb) | 351 cm (138 in) | 340 cm (130 in) | (China) Shanghai |
| 3 | Yuan Zhi | 29 September 1981 | 1.95 m (6 ft 5 in) | 88 kg (194 lb) | 348 cm (137 in) | 334 cm (131 in) | (China) Liaoning |
| 6 | Liang Chunlong | 25 March 1988 | 2.06 m (6 ft 9 in) | 91 kg (201 lb) | 351 cm (138 in) | 333 cm (131 in) | (China) Liaoning |
| 7 | Zhong Weijun (c) | 20 April 1989 | 1.99 m (6 ft 6 in) | 80 kg (180 lb) | 347 cm (137 in) | 335 cm (132 in) | (China) Bayi |
| 8 | Cui Jianjun | 1 August 1985 | 1.90 m (6 ft 3 in) | 89 kg (196 lb) | 350 cm (140 in) | 335 cm (132 in) | (China) Henan |
| 9 | Jiao Shuai | 28 January 1984 | 1.94 m (6 ft 4 in) | 76 kg (168 lb) | 350 cm (140 in) | 341 cm (134 in) | (China) Henan |
| 11 | Geng Xin | 15 November 1989 | 2.08 m (6 ft 10 in) | 80 kg (180 lb) | 348 cm (137 in) | 338 cm (133 in) | (China) Shandong |
| 12 | Kong Fanwei | 4 December 1989 | 1.76 m (5 ft 9 in) | 80 kg (180 lb) | 320 cm (130 in) | 305 cm (120 in) | (China) Liaoning |
| 13 | Kou Zhichao | 26 June 1989 | 2.02 m (6 ft 8 in) | 95 kg (209 lb) | 355 cm (140 in) | 345 cm (136 in) | (China) Shandong |
| 14 | Xu Jingtao | 7 July 1988 | 2.02 m (6 ft 8 in) | 76 kg (168 lb) | 356 cm (140 in) | 320 cm (130 in) | (China) Bayi |
| 15 | Li Runming | 1 March 1990 | 1.98 m (6 ft 6 in) | 90 kg (200 lb) | 350 cm (140 in) | 326 cm (128 in) | (China) Shandong |
| 16 | Ren Qi | 24 February 1984 | 1.74 m (5 ft 9 in) | 70 kg (150 lb) | 322 cm (127 in) | 312 cm (123 in) | (China) Shanghai |
| 18 | Ji Daoshuai | 7 February 1992 | 1.95 m (6 ft 5 in) | 75 kg (165 lb) | 355 cm (140 in) | 335 cm (132 in) | (China) Shandong |
| 19 | Fang Yingchao | 3 August 1982 | 1.98 m (6 ft 6 in) | 79 kg (174 lb) | 360 cm (140 in) | 350 cm (140 in) | (China) Shanghai |

=== Mexico ===
The following is the Mexican roster in the 2014 FIVB Men's Volleyball World Championship.

Head coach: Sergio Hernández

| No. | Name | Date of birth | Height | Weight | Spike | Block | 2014 club |
|---|---|---|---|---|---|---|---|
| 1 | Daniel Vargas | 1 September 1986 | 1.99 m (6 ft 6 in) | 85 kg (187 lb) | 340 cm (130 in) | 330 cm (130 in) | (Mexico) Pumas UNAM |
| 4 | Gustavo Meyer | 3 October 1979 | 1.93 m (6 ft 4 in) | 84 kg (185 lb) | 340 cm (130 in) | 330 cm (130 in) | (Mexico) Pumas UNAM |
| 5 | Jesús Rangel | 20 September 1980 | 1.93 m (6 ft 4 in) | 82 kg (181 lb) | 337 cm (133 in) | 330 cm (130 in) | (Mexico) Halcones |
| 7 | Jorge Quiñones | 13 November 1981 | 1.86 m (6 ft 1 in) | 80 kg (180 lb) | 330 cm (130 in) | 325 cm (128 in) | (Mexico) Guanajuato |
| 8 | Édgar Herrera | 22 January 1988 | 1.94 m (6 ft 4 in) | 75 kg (165 lb) | 330 cm (130 in) | 320 cm (130 in) | (Mexico) Cocoteros de Colima |
| 9 | Carlos Guerra (c) | 3 August 1981 | 1.96 m (6 ft 5 in) | 95 kg (209 lb) | 339 cm (133 in) | 330 cm (130 in) | (Switzerland) Chênois Genève |
| 10 | Pedro Rangel | 16 September 1988 | 1.94 m (6 ft 4 in) | 78 kg (172 lb) | 340 cm (130 in) | 324 cm (128 in) | (Germany) Moerser SC |
| 11 | Jorge Barajas | 7 May 1991 | 1.87 m (6 ft 2 in) | 80 kg (180 lb) | 320 cm (130 in) | 317 cm (125 in) | (Mexico) Tigres UANL |
| 13 | Samuel Córdova | 13 March 1989 | 2.00 m (6 ft 7 in) | 89 kg (196 lb) | 353 cm (139 in) | 335 cm (132 in) | (Mexico) Cocoteros de Colima |
| 14 | Tomás Aguilera | 15 November 1988 | 2.02 m (6 ft 8 in) | 95 kg (209 lb) | 350 cm (140 in) | 340 cm (130 in) | (Mexico) Chihuahua |
| 15 | Martín Petris | 23 July 1990 | 1.95 m (6 ft 5 in) | 80 kg (180 lb) | 337 cm (133 in) | 322 cm (127 in) | (Mexico) Halcones |
| 16 | Jesús Alberto Perales | 22 December 1993 | 2.00 m (6 ft 7 in) | 86 kg (190 lb) | 328 cm (129 in) | 304 cm (120 in) | (Mexico) Halcones |
| 17 | Néstor Orellana | 7 January 1992 | 1.90 m (6 ft 3 in) | 84 kg (185 lb) | 332 cm (131 in) | 327 cm (129 in) | (Mexico) Tigres UANL |
| 20 | Julián Duarte | 16 June 1994 | 2.00 m (6 ft 7 in) | 79 kg (174 lb) | 321 cm (126 in) | 302 cm (119 in) | (Mexico) Sonora |

== Pool D ==
=== Italy ===
The following is the Italian roster in the 2014 FIVB Men's Volleyball World Championship.

Head coach: Mauro Berruto

| No. | Name | Date of birth | Height | Weight | Spike | Block | 2014 club |
|---|---|---|---|---|---|---|---|
| 2 | Jiří Kovář | 10 April 1989 | 2.02 m (6 ft 8 in) | 95 kg (209 lb) | 353 cm (139 in) | 330 cm (130 in) | (Italy) Lube Banca Marche Macerata |
| 3 | Simone Parodi | 16 June 1986 | 1.96 m (6 ft 5 in) | 82 kg (181 lb) | 350 cm (140 in) | 335 cm (132 in) | (Italy) Lube Banca Marche Macerata |
| 4 | Luca Vettori | 26 April 1991 | 2.00 m (6 ft 7 in) | 95 kg (209 lb) | 345 cm (136 in) | 323 cm (127 in) | (Italy) Casa Modena |
| 7 | Salvatore Rossini | 13 July 1986 | 1.85 m (6 ft 1 in) | 82 kg (181 lb) | 312 cm (123 in) | 301 cm (119 in) | (Italy) Casa Modena |
| 9 | Ivan Zaytsev | 2 October 1988 | 2.02 m (6 ft 8 in) | 92 kg (203 lb) | 355 cm (140 in) | 348 cm (137 in) | (Italy) Lube Banca Marche Macerata |
| 10 | Filippo Lanza | 3 March 1991 | 1.98 m (6 ft 6 in) | 98 kg (216 lb) | 350 cm (140 in) | 330 cm (130 in) | (Italy) Diatec Trentino |
| 11 | Simone Buti | 19 September 1983 | 2.06 m (6 ft 9 in) | 100 kg (220 lb) | 346 cm (136 in) | 328 cm (129 in) | (Italy) Sir Safety Perugia |
| 13 | Dragan Travica | 28 August 1986 | 2.00 m (6 ft 7 in) | 94 kg (207 lb) | 335 cm (132 in) | 320 cm (130 in) | (Russia) Belogorie Belgorod |
| 14 | Matteo Piano | 24 October 1990 | 2.08 m (6 ft 10 in) | 102 kg (225 lb) | 352 cm (139 in) | 325 cm (128 in) | (Italy) Casa Modena |
| 15 | Emanuele Birarelli (c) | 8 February 1981 | 2.02 m (6 ft 8 in) | 95 kg (209 lb) | 340 cm (130 in) | 316 cm (124 in) | (Italy) Diatec Trentino |
| 16 | Michele Baranowicz | 5 August 1989 | 1.96 m (6 ft 5 in) | 93 kg (205 lb) | 350 cm (140 in) | 328 cm (129 in) | (Italy) Lube Banca Marche Macerata |
| 18 | Giulio Sabbi | 10 August 1989 | 2.01 m (6 ft 7 in) | 92 kg (203 lb) | 352 cm (139 in) | 325 cm (128 in) | (Italy) Lube Banca Marche Macerata |
| 19 | Simone Anzani | 24 February 1992 | 2.04 m (6 ft 8 in) | 100 kg (220 lb) | 350 cm (140 in) | 330 cm (130 in) | (Italy) Calzedonia Verona |
| 20 | Massimo Colaci | 21 February 1985 | 1.80 m (5 ft 11 in) | 75 kg (165 lb) | 324 cm (128 in) | 308 cm (121 in) | (Italy) Diatec Trentino |

=== United States ===
The following is the American roster in the 2014 FIVB Men's Volleyball World Championship.

Head coach: John Speraw

| No. | Name | Date of birth | Height | Weight | Spike | Block | 2014 club |
|---|---|---|---|---|---|---|---|
| 1 | Matt Anderson | 18 April 1987 | 2.02 m (6 ft 8 in) | 100 kg (220 lb) | 360 cm (140 in) | 332 cm (131 in) | (Russia) Zenit Kazan |
| 3 | Taylor Sander | 17 March 1992 | 1.96 m (6 ft 5 in) | 80 kg (180 lb) | 345 cm (136 in) | 320 cm (130 in) | (United States) BYU |
| 4 | David Lee (c) | 8 March 1982 | 2.03 m (6 ft 8 in) | 105 kg (231 lb) | 350 cm (140 in) | 325 cm (128 in) | (China) Shanghai |
| 6 | Paul Lotman | 3 November 1985 | 2.00 m (6 ft 7 in) | 102 kg (225 lb) | 336 cm (132 in) | 312 cm (123 in) | (Poland) Asseco Resovia Rzeszów |
| 7 | Kawika Shoji | 11 November 1987 | 1.90 m (6 ft 3 in) | 79 kg (174 lb) | 331 cm (130 in) | 315 cm (124 in) | (Germany) Berlin Recycling Volleys |
| 10 | Antonio Ciarelli | 13 April 1990 | 1.83 m (6 ft 0 in) | 95 kg (209 lb) | 335 cm (132 in) | 304 cm (120 in) | Unattached |
| 11 | Micah Christenson | 8 May 1993 | 1.98 m (6 ft 6 in) | 88 kg (194 lb) | 349 cm (137 in) | 340 cm (130 in) | (United States) USC |
| 15 | Carson Clark | 20 January 1989 | 2.05 m (6 ft 9 in) | 93 kg (205 lb) | 365 cm (144 in) | 360 cm (140 in) | (Poland) Transfer Bydgoszcz |
| 17 | Maxwell Holt | 12 March 1987 | 2.05 m (6 ft 9 in) | 90 kg (200 lb) | 351 cm (138 in) | 333 cm (131 in) | (Russia) Dinamo Moscow |
| 18 | Garrett Muagututia | 26 February 1988 | 2.05 m (6 ft 9 in) | 92 kg (203 lb) | 359 cm (141 in) | 345 cm (136 in) | (Turkey) Konak Belediyesi |
| 19 | Alfredo Reft | 15 December 1982 | 1.78 m (5 ft 10 in) | 83 kg (183 lb) | 319 cm (126 in) | 309 cm (122 in) | Unattached |
| 20 | David Smith | 15 May 1985 | 2.01 m (6 ft 7 in) | 86 kg (190 lb) | 348 cm (137 in) | 314 cm (124 in) | (France) Tours VB |
| 21 | Nicholas Vogel | 5 February 1990 | 2.05 m (6 ft 9 in) | 90 kg (200 lb) | 328 cm (129 in) | 310 cm (120 in) | (United States) UCLA |
| 22 | Erik Shoji | 24 August 1989 | 1.84 m (6 ft 0 in) | 83 kg (183 lb) | 330 cm (130 in) | 321 cm (126 in) | (Austria) Hypo Tirol Innsbruck |

=== Iran ===
The following is the Iranian roster in the 2014 FIVB Men's Volleyball World Championship.

Head coach: (Serbia) Slobodan Kovač

| No. | Name | Date of birth | Height | Weight | Spike | Block | 2014 club |
|---|---|---|---|---|---|---|---|
| 1 | Shahram Mahmoudi | 20 July 1988 | 1.98 m (6 ft 6 in) | 95 kg (209 lb) | 347 cm (137 in) | 332 cm (131 in) | (Iran) Matin Varamin |
| 2 | Milad Ebadipour | 17 October 1993 | 2.02 m (6 ft 8 in) | 78 kg (172 lb) | 350 cm (140 in) | 310 cm (120 in) | (Iran) Kalleh Mazandaran |
| 3 | Saman Faezi | 23 August 1991 | 2.04 m (6 ft 8 in) | 87 kg (192 lb) | 343 cm (135 in) | 335 cm (132 in) | (Iran) Paykan Tehran |
| 4 | Saeid Marouf (c) | 20 October 1985 | 1.89 m (6 ft 2 in) | 81 kg (179 lb) | 331 cm (130 in) | 311 cm (122 in) | (Iran) Matin Varamin |
| 5 | Farhad Ghaemi | 28 August 1989 | 1.97 m (6 ft 6 in) | 73 kg (161 lb) | 355 cm (140 in) | 335 cm (132 in) | (Iran) Barij Essence Kashan |
| 6 | Mohammad Mousavi | 22 August 1987 | 2.03 m (6 ft 8 in) | 86 kg (190 lb) | 362 cm (143 in) | 344 cm (135 in) | (Iran) Matin Varamin |
| 7 | Pouria Fayazi | 12 January 1993 | 1.94 m (6 ft 4 in) | 87 kg (192 lb) | 348 cm (137 in) | 326 cm (128 in) | (Iran) Shahrdari Urmia |
| 8 | Farhad Zarif | 3 March 1983 | 1.65 m (5 ft 5 in) | 60 kg (130 lb) | 290 cm (110 in) | 271 cm (107 in) | (Iran) Kalleh Mazandaran |
| 9 | Adel Gholami | 9 February 1986 | 1.95 m (6 ft 5 in) | 88 kg (194 lb) | 341 cm (134 in) | 330 cm (130 in) | (Iran) Kalleh Mazandaran |
| 10 | Amir Ghafour | 6 June 1991 | 2.02 m (6 ft 8 in) | 90 kg (200 lb) | 354 cm (139 in) | 334 cm (131 in) | (Iran) Barij Essence Kashan |
| 12 | Mojtaba Mirzajanpour | 7 October 1991 | 1.95 m (6 ft 5 in) | 88 kg (194 lb) | 325 cm (128 in) | 315 cm (124 in) | (Iran) Matin Varamin |
| 13 | Mehdi Mahdavi | 13 February 1984 | 1.91 m (6 ft 3 in) | 96 kg (212 lb) | 330 cm (130 in) | 310 cm (120 in) | (Iran) Barij Essence Kashan |
| 15 | Armin Tashakkori | 8 December 1986 | 2.00 m (6 ft 7 in) | 94 kg (207 lb) | 355 cm (140 in) | 335 cm (132 in) | (Iran) Barij Essence Kashan |
| 16 | Abdolreza Alizadeh | 19 February 1987 | 1.83 m (6 ft 0 in) | 80 kg (180 lb) | 272 cm (107 in) | 252 cm (99 in) | (Iran) Shahrdari Urmia |

=== France ===
The following is the French roster in the 2014 FIVB Men's Volleyball World Championship.

Head coach: Laurent Tillie

| No. | Name | Date of birth | Height | Weight | Spike | Block | 2014 club |
|---|---|---|---|---|---|---|---|
| 1 | Jonas Aguenier | 28 April 1992 | 2.00 m (6 ft 7 in) | 97 kg (214 lb) | 340 cm (130 in) | 310 cm (120 in) | (France) AS Cannes |
| 2 | Jenia Grebennikov | 13 August 1990 | 1.88 m (6 ft 2 in) | 74 kg (163 lb) | 345 cm (136 in) | 330 cm (130 in) | (Germany) VfB Friedrichshafen |
| 4 | Antonin Rouzier | 18 August 1986 | 2.01 m (6 ft 7 in) | 100 kg (220 lb) | 350 cm (140 in) | 330 cm (130 in) | (Turkey) Ziraat Bankası Ankara |
| 6 | Benjamin Toniutti (c) | 30 October 1989 | 1.83 m (6 ft 0 in) | 74 kg (163 lb) | 320 cm (130 in) | 300 cm (120 in) | (Italy) CMC Ravenna |
| 7 | Kévin Tillie | 2 November 1990 | 1.98 m (6 ft 6 in) | 83 kg (183 lb) | 345 cm (136 in) | 325 cm (128 in) | (Turkey) Arkas Izmir |
| 9 | Earvin N'Gapeth | 12 February 1991 | 1.94 m (6 ft 4 in) | 93 kg (205 lb) | 358 cm (141 in) | 327 cm (129 in) | (Italy) Casa Modena |
| 10 | Kévin Le Roux | 11 May 1989 | 2.09 m (6 ft 10 in) | 95 kg (209 lb) | 365 cm (144 in) | 340 cm (130 in) | (Italy) Copra Elior Piacenza |
| 14 | Nicolas Le Goff | 15 February 1992 | 2.04 m (6 ft 8 in) | 97 kg (214 lb) | 346 cm (136 in) | 317 cm (125 in) | (France) Montpellier UC |
| 15 | Samuel Tuia | 24 July 1986 | 1.95 m (6 ft 5 in) | 95 kg (209 lb) | 345 cm (136 in) | 325 cm (128 in) | (Turkey) Galatasaray Istanbul |
| 16 | Nicolas Maréchal | 4 March 1987 | 1.98 m (6 ft 6 in) | 83 kg (183 lb) | 338 cm (133 in) | 327 cm (129 in) | (Poland) Jastrzębski Węgiel |
| 17 | Franck Lafitte | 8 March 1989 | 2.03 m (6 ft 8 in) | 95 kg (209 lb) | 350 cm (140 in) | 330 cm (130 in) | (France) Montpellier UC |
| 18 | Yoann Jaumel | 16 September 1987 | 1.81 m (5 ft 11 in) | 77 kg (170 lb) | 320 cm (130 in) | 303 cm (119 in) | (France) GFC Ajaccio |
| 19 | Nicolas Rossard | 23 May 1990 | 1.83 m (6 ft 0 in) | 65 kg (143 lb) | 315 cm (124 in) | 305 cm (120 in) | (France) Arago de Sète |
| 21 | Mory Sidibé | 17 June 1987 | 1.93 m (6 ft 4 in) | 92 kg (203 lb) | 367 cm (144 in) | 330 cm (130 in) | (France) Paris Volley |

=== Puerto Rico ===
The following is the Puerto Rican roster in the 2014 FIVB Men's Volleyball World Championship.

Head coach: David Alemán

| No. | Name | Date of birth | Height | Weight | Spike | Block | 2014 club |
|---|---|---|---|---|---|---|---|
| 1 | José Rivera | 2 July 1977 | 1.92 m (6 ft 4 in) | 85 kg (187 lb) | 325 cm (128 in) | 320 cm (130 in) | (Puerto Rico) Nuevos Gigantes de Carolina |
| 2 | Edgardo Goás | 27 January 1989 | 1.97 m (6 ft 6 in) | 95 kg (209 lb) | 345 cm (136 in) | 330 cm (130 in) | (Puerto Rico) Capitanes de Arecibo |
| 4 | Dennis Del Valle | 27 January 1989 | 1.75 m (5 ft 9 in) | 58 kg (128 lb) | 300 cm (120 in) | 290 cm (110 in) | (Puerto Rico) Mets de Guaynabo |
| 5 | Roberto Muñiz | 11 June 1980 | 1.96 m (6 ft 5 in) | 92 kg (203 lb) | 333 cm (131 in) | 326 cm (128 in) | (Puerto Rico) Capitanes de Arecibo |
| 10 | Ezequiel Cruz | 15 July 1986 | 1.93 m (6 ft 4 in) | 88 kg (194 lb) | 320 cm (130 in) | 310 cm (120 in) | (Puerto Rico) Mets de Guaynabo |
| 11 | Maurice Torres | 6 July 1991 | 1.92 m (6 ft 4 in) | 68 kg (150 lb) | 305 cm (120 in) | 299 cm (118 in) | Unattached |
| 12 | Héctor Soto (c) | 20 June 1978 | 1.97 m (6 ft 6 in) | 85 kg (187 lb) | 340 cm (130 in) | 332 cm (131 in) | (Puerto Rico) Mets de Guaynabo |
| 14 | Mannix Román | 17 January 1983 | 1.90 m (6 ft 3 in) | 85 kg (187 lb) | 295 cm (116 in) | 288 cm (113 in) | (Puerto Rico) Mets de Guaynabo |
| 16 | Jackson Rivera | 19 August 1987 | 1.86 m (6 ft 1 in) | 66 kg (146 lb) | 360 cm (140 in) | 350 cm (140 in) | (Puerto Rico) Mets de Guaynabo |
| 17 | Pedrito Sierra | 21 July 1989 | 1.96 m (6 ft 5 in) | 89 kg (196 lb) | 305 cm (120 in) | 298 cm (117 in) | (Puerto Rico) Cariduros de Fajardo |
| 19 | Jean Carlos Ortiz | 23 February 1988 | 1.93 m (6 ft 4 in) | 77 kg (170 lb) | 288 cm (113 in) | 281 cm (111 in) | (Puerto Rico) Mets de Guaynabo |
| 20 | Fernando Morales | 4 February 1982 | 1.86 m (6 ft 1 in) | 68 kg (150 lb) | 325 cm (128 in) | 318 cm (125 in) | (Puerto Rico) Mets de Guaynabo |

=== Belgium ===
The following is the Belgian roster in the 2014 FIVB Men's Volleyball World Championship.

Head coach: Dominique Baeyens

| No. | Name | Date of birth | Height | Weight | Spike | Block | 2014 club |
|---|---|---|---|---|---|---|---|
| 1 | Bram Van Den Dries | 14 August 1989 | 2.06 m (6 ft 9 in) | 100 kg (220 lb) | 365 cm (144 in) | 344 cm (135 in) | (France) Beauvais Oise UC |
| 2 | Hendrik Tuerlinckx | 1 December 1987 | 1.95 m (6 ft 5 in) | 86 kg (190 lb) | 355 cm (140 in) | 338 cm (133 in) | (Belgium) Knack Roeselare |
| 3 | Sam Deroo | 29 April 1992 | 2.02 m (6 ft 8 in) | 101 kg (223 lb) | 360 cm (140 in) | 340 cm (130 in) | (Italy) Casa Modena |
| 4 | Pieter Coolman | 24 April 1989 | 2.00 m (6 ft 7 in) | 92 kg (203 lb) | 353 cm (139 in) | 346 cm (136 in) | (Belgium) Knack Roeselare |
| 5 | Frank Depestele (c) | 3 September 1977 | 1.91 m (6 ft 3 in) | 96 kg (212 lb) | 335 cm (132 in) | 330 cm (130 in) | (France) Beauvais Oise UC |
| 7 | Gertjan Claes | 30 March 1985 | 1.90 m (6 ft 3 in) | 88 kg (194 lb) | 336 cm (132 in) | 307 cm (121 in) | (Belgium) Knack Roeselare |
| 8 | Kevin Klinkenberg | 4 October 1990 | 1.97 m (6 ft 6 in) | 86 kg (190 lb) | 342 cm (135 in) | 320 cm (130 in) | (France) Tours VB |
| 9 | Pieter Verhees | 8 December 1989 | 2.05 m (6 ft 9 in) | 107 kg (236 lb) | 355 cm (140 in) | 342 cm (135 in) | (Italy) Andreoli Latina |
| 10 | Simon Van De Voorde | 19 December 1989 | 2.08 m (6 ft 10 in) | 85 kg (187 lb) | 348 cm (137 in) | 327 cm (129 in) | (Poland) Jastrzębski Węgiel |
| 11 | Matthijs Verhanneman | 8 December 1988 | 1.98 m (6 ft 6 in) | 96 kg (212 lb) | 344 cm (135 in) | 320 cm (130 in) | (Belgium) Knack Roeselare |
| 12 | Gert Van Walle | 7 August 1987 | 1.97 m (6 ft 6 in) | 87 kg (192 lb) | 355 cm (140 in) | 335 cm (132 in) | (Italy) Altotevere Città di Castello |
| 14 | Bert Derkoningen | 10 July 1982 | 1.89 m (6 ft 2 in) | 78 kg (172 lb) | 330 cm (130 in) | 320 cm (130 in) | (Belgium) Noliko Maaseik |
| 16 | Matthias Valkiers | 8 April 1990 | 1.98 m (6 ft 6 in) | 92 kg (203 lb) | 321 cm (126 in) | 308 cm (121 in) | (Belgium) Noliko Maaseik |
| 18 | Lowie Stuer | 24 November 1995 | 1.93 m (6 ft 4 in) | 81 kg (179 lb) | 367 cm (144 in) | 330 cm (130 in) | (Belgium) Knack Roeselare |

== See also ==
- 2014 FIVB Volleyball Women's World Championship squads
