= 2014 Central American and Caribbean Games women's volleyball squads =

This article shows all participating women's volleyball squads at the 2014 Central American and Caribbean Games, held from November 15 to 22, 2014 in Veracruz, Mexico.

== Colombia ==
- Head coach: Mauro Marasciulo

| # | Name | Date of birth | Height | Weight | Spike | Block |
|---|---|---|---|---|---|---|
| 2 | Paola Ampudia | 05.08.1988 | 183 | 66 | 310 | 290 |
| 3 | Yeisy Soto | 07.04.1996 | 184 | 61 | 301 | 275 |
| 6 | Manuela Vargas | 13.09.1996 | 174 | 74 | 299 | 290 |
| 8 | Veronica Pasos | 15.06.1996 | 180 | 63 | 302 | 285 |
| 9 | Yurani Romana | 04.10.1989 | 183 | 72 | 315 | 295 |
| 10 | Diana Arrechea | 14.09.1994 | 176 | 67 | 293 | 278 |
| 11 | Danna Escobar | 25.01.1994 | 195 | 98 | 295 | 283 |
| 12 | Ivonne Monaño | 12.11.1995 | 187 | 72 | 302 | 291 |
| 13 | Camila Gómez | 06.07.1995 | 158 | 61 | 283 | 250 |
| 15 | Maria Alejandra Marin (c) | 04.11.1995 | 178 | 68 | 281 | 270 |
| 19 | Margarita Martínez | 19.05.1995 | 178 | 71 | 293 | 281 |
| 20 | Amanda Coneo | 20.12.1996 | 177 | 58 | 295 | 280 |

== Costa Rica ==
- Head coach: Horacio Bastit

| # | Name | Date of birth | Height | Weight | Spike | Block |
|---|---|---|---|---|---|---|
| 2 | Monica Picado | 10.01.1994 | 155 | 75 | 250 | 240 |
| 3 | Viviana Murillo | 06.02.1992 | 164 | 63 | 260 | 250 |
| 6 | Angela Willis (c) | 26.01.1977 | 186 | 67 | 315 | 310 |
| 7 | Monica Muñoz | 20.12.1995 | 178 | 72 | 278 | 278 |
| 9 | Verania Willis | 23.09.1979 | 182 | 73 | 303 | 285 |
| 10 | Paola Ramírez | 23.02.1987 | 186 | 73 | 305 | 300 |
| 11 | Daniela Vargas | 04.05.1996 | 184 | 72 | 295 | 285 |
| 12 | Tatiana Sayles | 01.08.1997 | 177 | 77 | 288 | 268 |
| 14 | Irene Fonseca | 10.10.1985 | 180 | 70 | 285 | 280 |
| 15 | Tania Carazo | 11.08.1996 | 173 | 53 | 280 | 265 |
| 16 | Mijal Hines Cuza | 15.12.1993 | 184 | 80 | 290 | 285 |
| 20 | Valeria Campos | 20.01.1995 | 178 | 70 | 280 | 270 |

== Cuba ==
- Head coach: Juan Gala

| # | Name | Date of birth | Height | Weight | Spike | Block |
|---|---|---|---|---|---|---|
| 2 | Regla Gracia | 28.05.1993 | 177 | 67 | 301 | 282 |
| 3 | Alena Rojas | 09.08.1992 | 186 | 76 | 320 | 305 |
| 4 | Melissa Vargas | 16.10.1999 | 192 | 72 | 322 | 305 |
| 5 | Yamila Hernández | 08.11.1992 | 192 | 69 | 301 | 285 |
| 6 | Daymara Lescay | 05.09.1992 | 184 | 72 | 308 | 290 |
| 9 | Dayessi Luis | 23.10.1996 | 170 | 60 | 297 | 293 |
| 10 | Emily Borrell | 19.02.1992 | 167 | 55 | 270 | 260 |
| 11 | Gretell Moreno | 30.01.1998 | 184 | 65 | 304 | 295 |
| 14 | Dayami Sánchez | 14.03.1994 | 188 | 64 | 314 | 302 |
| 17 | Heidy Casanova | 06.11.1998 | 184 | 78 | 244 | 240 |
| 18 | Sulian Matienzo (c) | 14.12.1994 | 178 | 75 | 232 | 230 |
| 20 | Jennifer Álvarez | 19.11.1993 | 184 | 72 | 310 | 294 |

== Dominican Republic ==
- Head coach: Marcos Kwiek

| # | Name | Date of birth | Height | Weight | Spike | Block |
|---|---|---|---|---|---|---|
| 1 | Annerys Vargas | 07.08.1981 | 196 | 70 | 327 | 320 |
| 4 | Marianne Fersola | 16.01.1992 | 191 | 60 | 315 | 310 |
| 5 | Brenda Castillo | 05.06.1992 | 167 | 55 | 220 | 270 |
| 6 | Camil Domínguez | 07.12.1991 | 176 | 75 | 232 | 275 |
| 7 | Niverka Marte | 19.10.1990 | 178 | 71 | 295 | 283 |
| 8 | Cándida Arias | 11.03.1992 | 194 | 68 | 320 | 315 |
| 14 | Prisilla Rivera | 29.12.1984 | 183 | 67 | 309 | 305 |
| 16 | Yonkaira Peña | 10.05.1993 | 190 | 70 | 320 | 310 |
| 17 | Gina Mambrú | 21.01.1986 | 182 | 65 | 330 | 315 |
| 18 | Bethania de la Cruz (c) | 13.05.1987 | 188 | 70 | 330 | 320 |
| 19 | Ana Yorkira Binet | 09.02.1992 | 174 | 58 | 280 | 260 |
| 20 | Brayelin Martínez | 11.09.1996 | 200 | 72 | 330 | 320 |

== Mexico ==
- Head coach: Jorge Azair

| # | Name | Date of birth | Height | Weight | Spike | Block |
|---|---|---|---|---|---|---|
| 1 | Gema León | 11.03.1991 | 181 | 61 | 292 | 275 |
| 2 | Lizette López | 14.05.1990 | 164 | 62 | 277 | 252 |
| 3 | Claudia Resendiz | 21.05.1994 | 172 | 72 | 268 | 260 |
| 5 | Andrea Rangel (c) | 19.05.1993 | 180 | 57 | 297 | 289 |
| 8 | Carolina Carranza | 29.06.1990 | 178 | 83 | 275 | 252 |
| 9 | Patricia Segura | 09.11.1993 | 173 | 69 | 270 | 260 |
| 10 | Seomara Sainz | 14.12.1995 | 178 | 55 | 295 | 285 |
| 13 | Marion Frias | 19.01.1982 | 191 | 100 | 305 | 296 |
| 14 | Claudia Ríos | 22.09.1992 | 174 | 54 | 282 | 272 |
| 15 | Jocelyn Urias | 16.02.1996 | 190 | 65 | 296 | 284 |
| 18 | Yasmin Hernández | 18.09.1989 | 175 | 70 | 286 | 280 |
| 21 | Kaomi Solis | 06.08.1994 | 160 | 56 | 250 | 240 |

== Puerto Rico ==
- Head coach: José Mieles

| # | Name | Date of birth | Height | Weight | Spike | Block |
|---|---|---|---|---|---|---|
| 3 | Vilmarie Mojica | 13.08.1985 | 180 | 78 | 244 | 242 |
| 4 | Patricia Montero | 22.08.1997 | 178 | 77 | 242 | 236 |
| 5 | Sarai Álvarez | 03.04.1986 | 185 | 82 | 246 | 239 |
| 6 | Yarimar Rosa (c) | 20.06.1988 | 178 | 78 | 244 | 238 |
| 7 | Stephanie Enright | 15.12.1990 | 177 | 77 | 244 | 238 |
| 9 | Áurea Cruz | 10.01.1982 | 180 | 77 | 248 | 242 |
| 14 | Natalia Valentin | 12.09.1989 | 170 | 77 | 182 | 236 |
| 15 | Nayka Benítez | 08.02.1989 | 170 | 74 | 222 | 217 |
| 16 | Jessica Candelario | 11.02.1987 | 189 | 77 | 242 | 237 |
| 18 | Lynda Morales | 20.05.1988 | 188 | 78 | 242 | 235 |
| 19 | Legna Hernández | 18.07.1991 | 178 | 72 | 242 | 236 |
| 21 | Amanda Vásquez | 30.03.1984 | 185 | 69 | 244 | 239 |

== Trinidad and Tobago ==
- Head coach: Drakes Nicholson

| # | Name | Date of birth | Height | Weight | Spike | Block |
|---|---|---|---|---|---|---|
| 2 | Jalicia Ross-Kydd | 26.07.1984 | 186 | 75 | 316 | 296 |
| 3 | Channon Thompson | 29.03.1984 | 185 | 72 | 315 | 303 |
| 4 | Kelly-Anne Billingy (c) | 15.05.1986 | 187 | 80 | 316 | 303 |
| 6 | Sinead Jack | 08.11.1993 | 189 | 65 | 289 | 290 |
| 7 | Marisha Herbert | 27.06.1993 | 180 | 65 | 270 | 272 |
| 8 | Darlene Ramdin | 05.08.1989 | 187 | 89 | 286 | 281 |
| 9 | Malika Davidson | 06.03.1986 | 185 | 65 | 285 | 280 |
| 10 | Courtnee-Mae Clifford | 06.07.1990 | 165 | 65 | 280 | 273 |
| 11 | Malika York | 07.01.1995 | 185 | 75 | 245 | 263 |
| 12 | Sakile Grannum | 26.10.1996 | 152 | 55 | 235 | 230 |
| 14 | Kaylon Cruickshank | 09.07.1998 | 181 | 60 | 270 | 262 |
| 19 | Maya Roberts | 03.07.1996 | 152 | 58 | 230 | 228 |

== Venezuela ==
- Head coach: Sergio Rivero

| # | Name | Date of birth | Height | Weight | Spike | Block |
|---|---|---|---|---|---|---|
| 1 | Yessica Paz | 07.10.1989 | 191 | 78 | 312 | 309 |
| 2 | Isis Francesco | 23.05.1996 | 168 | 66 |
| 5 | Genesis Francesco | 06.05.1990 | 175 | 62 | 295 | 290 |
| 6 | Naimir García | 02.03.1996 | 173 | 58 | 295 | 291 |
| 7 | Angerlis Colmenaris | 21.01.1998 | 189 | 68 | 302 | 298 |
| 8 | Diana Paredes | 18.07.1996 | 175 | 56 | 296 | 291 |
| 10 | Desiree Glod (c) | 28.09.1982 | 175 | 62 | 308 | 302 |
| 11 | Meriyen Serrano | 14.12.1997 | 192 | 66 | 312 | 305 |
| 14 | Sharlin Bidean | 19.01.1992 | 189 | 72 | 305 | 300 |
| 15 | María José Pérez | 18.03.1988 | 183 | 71 | 315 | 300 |
| 16 | Leyna Morillo | 12.06.1983 | 183 | 68 | 302 | 298 |
| 17 | Roslandy Acosta | 25.02.1992 | 190 | 68 | 310 | 306 |
