= 2014 Men's Pan-American Volleyball Cup =

Tournament details
- Host country: Mexico
- Dates: 11–16 August
- Teams: 9
- Venue: 1 (in 1 host city)

Final positions
- Champions: Cuba (1st title)

Tournament awards
- MVP: (Cuba) Rolando Cepeda

The 2014 Men's Pan-American Volleyball Cup was the ninth edition of the annual men's volleyball tournament, played by nine countries. It was held in Tijuana, Mexico, from 11 to 16 August 2014. The tournament served as a rating for the 2015 FIVB World League.

== Pools composition ==
Pool A	Pool B	Pool C
Mexico	Cuba	Canada
Colombia	Puerto Rico	Venezuela
United States	Dominican Republic	Argentina

== Venue ==
- Centro de Alto Rendimiento de Tijuana, Tijuana, Mexico

== Pool standing procedure ==
1. Numbers of matches won
2. Match points
3. Points ratio
4. Sets ratio
5. Result of the last match between the tied teams

Match won 3–0: 5 match points for the winner, 0 match points for the loser
Match won 3–1: 4 match points for the winner, 1 match point for the loser
Match won 3–2: 3 match points for the winner, 2 match points for the loser

== Preliminary round ==
- All times are Pacific Daylight Time (UTC−07:00).

Qualified for the semifinals
Qualified for the quarterfinals
Qualified for the 7th-place match
Qualified for the 9th-place match

=== Pool A ===
Pos	Team	Pld	W	L	Pts	SPW	SPL	SPR	SW	SL	SR
1	United States	2	2	0	10	156	131	1.191	6	0	MAX
2	Mexico	2	1	1	5	151	145	1.041	3	3	1.000
3	Colombia	2	0	2	0	120	151	0.795	0	6	0.000

Date	Time		Score		Set 1	Set 2	Set 3	Set 4	Set 5	Total	Report
11 Aug	21:28	Mexico	3–0	Colombia	25–20	25–20	26–24			76–64	P2 P3
12 Aug	19:08	Colombia	0–3	United States	18–25	23–25	15–25			56–75	P2 P3
13 Aug	19:46	Mexico	0–3	United States	29–31	23–25	23–25			75–81	P2 P3

=== Pool B ===
Pos	Team	Pld	W	L	Pts	SPW	SPL	SPR	SW	SL	SR
1	Cuba	2	2	0	8	180	167	1.078	6	2	3.000
2	Puerto Rico	2	1	1	7	184	166	1.108	5	3	1.667
3	Dominican Republic	2	0	2	0	122	153	0.797	0	6	0.000

Date	Time		Score		Set 1	Set 2	Set 3	Set 4	Set 5	Total	Report
11 Aug	17:37	Cuba	3–2	Puerto Rico	18–25	26–24	25–20	21–25	15–12	105–106	P2 P3
12 Aug	15:00	Puerto Rico	3–0	Dominican Republic	25–17	25–18	28–26			78–61	P2 P3
13 Aug	15:00	Dominican Republic	0–3	Cuba	19–25	19–25	23–25			61–75	P2 P3

=== Pool C ===
Pos	Team	Pld	W	L	Pts	SPW	SPL	SPR	SW	SL	SR
1	Argentina	2	2	0	8	198	183	1.082	6	2	3.000
2	Venezuela	2	1	1	4	177	175	1.011	3	4	0.750
3	Canada	2	0	2	3	197	214	0.921	3	6	0.500

Date	Time		Score		Set 1	Set 2	Set 3	Set 4	Set 5	Total	Report
11 Aug	15:00	Canada	1–3	Venezuela	20–25	17–25	25–21	28–30		90–101	P2 P3
12 Aug	17:00	Venezuela	0–3	Argentina	20–25	33–35	23–25			76–85	P2 P3
13 Aug	17:00	Argentina	3–2	Canada	25–18	21–25	25–22	23–25	19–17	113–107	P2 P3

== Final round ==
- All times are Pacific Daylight Time (UTC−07:00).

=== 7th–9th places ===
9th place match			7th place match
			1	Canada	3
2	Dominican Republic	3		Dominican Republic	2
3	Colombia	1

==== 9th place match ====
Date	Time		Score		Set 1	Set 2	Set 3	Set 4	Set 5	Total	Report
14 Aug	15:00	Dominican Republic	3–1	Colombia	25–21	25–27	25–20	25–21		100–89	P2 P3

==== 7th place match ====
Date	Time		Score		Set 1	Set 2	Set 3	Set 4	Set 5	Total	Report
15 Aug	15:00	Canada	3–2	Dominican Republic	25–21	22–25	22–25	25–16	15–13	109–100	P2 P3

=== Championship ===
First round
14 August
Cuba	3
Venezuela	2
14 August
Puerto Rico	3
Mexico	1

Semifinals
15 August
Argentina	2
Cuba	3
15 August
United States	3
Puerto Rico	0
Fifth place
16 August
Mexico	1
Venezuela	3

Final
16 August
Cuba	3
United States	0
Third place
16 August
Argentina	3
Puerto Rico	2

==== Quarterfinals ====
Date	Time		Score		Set 1	Set 2	Set 3	Set 4	Set 5	Total	Report
14 Aug	17:00	Cuba	3–2	Venezuela	23–25	25–20	25–16	29–31	15–6	117–98	P2 P3
14 Aug	20:13	Puerto Rico	3–1	Mexico	27–25	25–23	23–25	25–16		100–89	P2 P3

==== Semifinals ====
Date	Time		Score		Set 1	Set 2	Set 3	Set 4	Set 5	Total	Report
15 Aug	17:39	Argentina	2–3	Cuba	22–25	18–25	25–19	25–23	13–15	103–107	P2 P3
15 Aug	20:13	United States	3–0	Puerto Rico	28–26	25–22	26–24			79–72	P2 P3

==== 5th place match ====
Date	Time		Score		Set 1	Set 2	Set 3	Set 4	Set 5	Total	Report
16 Aug	15:00	Mexico	1–3	Venezuela	25–22	20–25	15–25	23–25		83–97	P2 P3

==== 3rd place match ====
Date	Time		Score		Set 1	Set 2	Set 3	Set 4	Set 5	Total	Report
16 Aug	17:19	Argentina	3–2	Puerto Rico	25–21	25–23	20–25	24–26	18–16	112–111	P2 P3

==== Final ====
Date	Time		Score		Set 1	Set 2	Set 3	Set 4	Set 5	Total	Report
16 Aug	20:00	Cuba	3–0	United States	25–16	25–23	25–23			75–62	P2 P3

== Final standing ==
Rank	Team
1st place, gold medalist(s)	Cuba
2nd place, silver medalist(s)	United States
3rd place, bronze medalist(s)	Argentina
4	Puerto Rico
5	Venezuela
6	Mexico
7	Canada
8	Dominican Republic
9	Colombia

2014 Men's Pan-American Cup
champions

Cuba
First title

12–man roster
González, Romero, Jiménez, Macías, Gutiérrez, Cepeda, Osoria, Fundora, Fiel, Mesa, Chapman, Uriarte
Head coach
Sánchez

== Awards ==
=== Best players ===
- Most valuable player
  (Cuba) Rolando Cepeda
- Best scorer
  (Puerto Rico) Maurice Torres
- Best spiker
  (Dominican Republic) José Miguel Cáceres
- Best blocker
  (Puerto Rico) Mannix Román
- Best server
  (Venezuela) Kervin Piñerua
- Best digger
  (Argentina) Franco López
- Best setter
  (United States) Robert Boldog
- Best receiver
  (Puerto Rico) José Rivera
- Best libero
  (Argentina) Franco López

=== All–star team ===
- Best setter
  (United States) Robert Boldog
- Best outside spikers
  (Cuba) Javier Jiménez
  (Argentina) Rodrigo Villalba
- Best middle blockers
  (Puerto Rico) Mannix Román
  (Cuba) David Fiel
- Best opposite spiker
  (Dominican Republic) José Miguel Cáceres
- Best libero
  (Argentina) Franco López
