= Volleyball at the 2014 Central American and Caribbean Games =

2014 Central American and Caribbean Games
Tournament details
- Host country: Mexico
- Dates: 15–30 November
- Teams: 15
- Venue: Córdoba Arena (in Veracruz, Mexico host cities)

The volleyball competition at the 2014 Central American and Caribbean Games was held in Veracruz, Mexico. The tournament was scheduled to be held from 15 to 30 November at the Córdoba Arena.

== Medal summary ==
Event	Gold	Silver	Bronze
Men's tournament	Dominican Republic; Antonio Rodríguez; Elvis Contreras; Wilfrido Hernández; Enger Mieses; Henry López; Luis Adames; Francisco Abreu López; José Miguel Cáceres; Mario Frias; Cesar Alcántara; Henry Tapia; Germán Recio	Puerto Rico; Pedro Cabrera; Edgardo Goas; Juan Figueroa; Roberto Muñiz; Jessie Colon; Ezequiel Cruz; Maurice Torres; Hector Soto; Mannix Roman; Fernando Morales; Jackson Rivera; Jean Ortíz	Cuba; Inovel Romero; Ricardo Calvo; Javier Jiménez; Leandro Macias; Keibel Gutiérrez; Yonder García; Rolando Cepeda; Livan Osoria; Lazaro Fundora; Isbel Mesa; Félix Chapman; Osmany Uriarte
Women's tournament	Dominican Republic; Annerys Vargas; Marianne Fersola; Brenda Castillo; Camil Domínguez; Niverka Marte; Candida Arias; Prisilla Rivera; Yonkaira Peña; Gina Mambru; Bethania de la Cruz; Ana Binet; Brayelin Martínez	Puerto Rico; Vilmarie Mojica; Patricia Montero; Sarai Alvarez; Yarimar Rosa; Stephanie Enright; Aurea Cruz; Natalia Valentin; Nayka Benítez; Jessica Candelario; Lynda Morales; Legna Hernandez; Amanda Vázquez	Cuba; Regla Gracia; Alena Rojas; Melissa Vargas; Yamila Hernández; Daymara Lescay; Dayessi Luis; Emily Borrell; Gretell Moreno; Dayami Sánchez; Heidy Casanova; Sulian Matienzo; Jennifer Álvarez

== Women's tournament ==
=== Participating teams ===
Group A	Group B
Colombia; Cuba; Dominican Republic; Venezuela	Costa Rica; Mexico; Puerto Rico; Trinidad and Tobago

=== Pool A ===
Pos	Team	Pld	W	L	Pts	SW	SL	SR	SPW	SPL	SPR	Qualification
1	Dominican Republic	3	3	0	15	9	0	MAX	225	155	1.452	Semifinals
2	Cuba	3	2	1	10	6	3	2.000	208	179	1.162	Quarterfinals
3	Colombia	3	1	2	5	3	6	0.500	186	219	0.849	Quarterfinals
4	Venezuela	3	0	3	0	0	9	0.000	160	226	0.708	5th–8th place

Date	Time		Score		Set 1	Set 2	Set 3	Set 4	Set 5	Total	Report
15 Nov	14:00	Cuba	3–0	Colombia	25–13	25–17	25–20			75–50	P2 P3
15 Nov	19:00	Dominican Republic	3–0	Venezuela	25–6	25–15	25–16			75–37	P2 P3
16 Nov	16:00	Venezuela	0–3	Cuba	22–25	20–25	12–25			54–75	P2 P3
16 Nov	19:00	Colombia	0–3	Dominican Republic	22–25	21–25	17–25			60–75	P2 P3
17 Nov	14:00	Venezuela	0–3	Colombia	22–25	24–26	23–25			69–76	P2 P3
17 Nov	19:00	Cuba	0–3	Dominican Republic	20–25	19–25	19–25			58–75	P2 P3

=== Pool B ===
Pos	Team	Pld	W	L	Pts	SW	SL	SR	SPW	SPL	SPR	Qualification
1	Puerto Rico	3	2	1	11	8	4	2.000	278	229	1.214	Semifinals
2	Mexico	3	2	1	11	7	3	2.333	237	202	1.173	Quarterfinals
3	Costa Rica	3	2	1	8	6	5	1.200	220	231	0.952	Quarterfinals
4	Trinidad and Tobago	3	0	3	0	0	9	0.000	152	225	0.676	5th–8th place

Date	Time		Score		Set 1	Set 2	Set 3	Set 4	Set 5	Total	Report
15 Nov	16:00	Puerto Rico	2–3	Costa Rica	22–25	25–13	21–25	25–12	11–15	104–90	P2 P3
15 Nov	21:00	Mexico	3–0	Trinidad and Tobago	25–17	25–16	25–15			75–48	P2 P3
16 Nov	14:00	Puerto Rico	3–0	Trinidad and Tobago	25–20	25–13	25–19			75–52	P2 P3
16 Nov	21:00	Mexico	3–0	Costa Rica	25–15	25–20	25–20			75–55	P2 P3
17 Nov	16:00	Trinidad and Tobago	0–3	Costa Rica	19–25	19–25	14–25			52–75	P2 P3
17 Nov	21:00	Mexico	1–3	Puerto Rico	17–25	25–22	25–27	20–25		87–99	P2 P3

=== Final round ===
==== Championship bracket ====
Quarterfinals
A2	Cuba	3
B3	Costa Rica	0
B2	Mexico	3
A3	Colombia	0

Semifinals
A1	Dominican Republic	3
B2	Mexico	0
B1	Puerto Rico	3
A2	Cuba	2

Finals
A1	Dominican Republic	3
B1	Puerto Rico	0
Third place
B2	Mexico	2
A2	Cuba	3

==== 5th to 8th places bracket ====
Classification 5-8
A4	Venezuela	3
B3	Costa Rica	1
B4	Trinidad and Tobago	1
A3	Colombia	3

Classification 7–8
B3	Costa Rica	3
B4	Trinidad and Tobago	1
Classification 5-6
A3	Colombia	2
A4	Venezuela	3

==== Quarterfinals ====
Date	Time		Score		Set 1	Set 2	Set 3	Set 4	Set 5	Total	Report
18 Nov	19:00	Cuba	3–0	Costa Rica	25–17	25–12	25–17			75–46	P2 P3
18 Nov	21:00	Mexico	3–0	Colombia	25–23	25–17	26–24			76–64	P2 P3

==== Classification 5–8 ====
Date	Time		Score		Set 1	Set 2	Set 3	Set 4	Set 5	Total	Report
19 Nov	14:00	Venezuela	3–1	Costa Rica	25–19	25–22	22–25	25-19		97–66	P2 P3
19 Nov	16:00	Trinidad and Tobago	0–3	Colombia	15–25	20–25	15–25			50–75	P2 P3

==== Semifinals ====
Date	Time		Score		Set 1	Set 2	Set 3	Set 4	Set 5	Total	Report
19 Nov	19:00	Dominican Republic	3–0	Mexico	25–11	25–23	27–25			77–59	P2 P3
19 Nov	21:00	Puerto Rico	3–2	Cuba	25–23	25–21	14–25	22-25	15-13	101–69	P2 P3

==== Classification 7–8 ====
Date	Time		Score		Set 1	Set 2	Set 3	Set 4	Set 5	Total	Report
20 Nov	14:00	Costa Rica	3–1	Trinidad and Tobago	25–19	25–13	17–25	25-18		92–57	P2 P3

==== Classification 5–6 ====
Date	Time		Score		Set 1	Set 2	Set 3	Set 4	Set 5	Total	Report
20 Nov	16:00	Venezuela	3–2	Colombia	36–34	21–25	25–15	20-25	15-13	117–74	P2 P3

==== Classification 3–4 ====
Date	Time		Score		Set 1	Set 2	Set 3	Set 4	Set 5	Total	Report
20 Nov	19:00	Mexico	2–3	Cuba	26–24	20–25	17–25	25-22	13-15	101–74	P2 P3

==== Final ====
Date	Time		Score		Set 1	Set 2	Set 3	Set 4	Set 5	Total	Report
20 Nov	21:00	Dominican Republic	3–0	Puerto Rico	25–19	25–19	25–19			75–57	P2 P3

=== Final standings ===
Rank	Team
1st place, gold medalist(s)	Dominican Republic
2nd place, silver medalist(s)	Puerto Rico
3rd place, bronze medalist(s)	Cuba
4	Mexico
5	Venezuela
6	Colombia
7	Costa Rica
8	Trinidad and Tobago

2014 Central American and Caribbean Games winners

Dominican Republic
Sixth title

=== Awards ===
- Most valuable player
  Brenda Castillo (DOM)
- Best scorer
  Melissa Vargas (CUB)
- Best outside spikers
  Regla Gracia (CUB)
  Áurea Cruz (PUR)
- Best middle blockers
  Annerys Vargas (DOM)
  Mijal Hines Cuza (CRC)
- Best opposite spiker
  Sarai Álvarez (PUR)
- Best digger
  Brenda Castillo (DOM)
- Best receiver
  Brenda Castillo (DOM)
- Best libero
  Brenda Castillo (DOM)
- Best setter
  Niverka Marte (DOM)
- Best server
  Gina Mambru (DOM)

== Men's tournament ==
=== Participating teams ===
Group A	Group B
Colombia; Dominican Republic; Mexico; Trinidad and Tobago	Bahamas; Cuba; Puerto Rico; Venezuela

=== Pool A ===
Pos	Team	Pld	W	L	Pts	SW	SL	SR	SPW	SPL	SPR	Qualification
1	Dominican Republic	3	3	0	14	9	1	9.000	250	197	1.269	Semifinals
2	Mexico	3	2	1	9	7	5	1.400	272	266	1.023	Quarterfinals
3	Colombia	3	1	2	7	5	6	0.833	247	229	1.079	Quarterfinals
4	Trinidad and Tobago	3	0	3	0	0	9	0.000	148	225	0.658	5th–8th place

Date	Time		Score		Set 1	Set 2	Set 3	Set 4	Set 5	Total	Report
25 Nov	14:00	Dominican Republic	3–0	Colombia	25–18	25–19	27–25			77–62	
25 Nov	19:00	Mexico	3–0	Trinidad and Tobago	25–19	25–18	25–21			75–58	
26 Nov	16:00	Trinidad and Tobago	0–3	Colombia	10–25	23–25	13–25			46–75	
26 Nov	19:00	Mexico	1–3	Dominican Republic	25–18	28–30	17–25	21-25		91–73	
27 Nov	14:00	Dominican Republic	3–0	Trinidad and Tobago	25–14	25–15	25–15			75–44	
27 Nov	19:00	Mexico	3–2	Colombia	27–25	18–25	25–23	21-25	15-12	106–73	

=== Pool B ===
Pos	Team	Pld	W	L	Pts	SW	SL	SR	SPW	SPL	SPR	Qualification
1	Puerto Rico	3	2	1	11	7	3	2.333	247	206	1.199	Semifinals
2	Cuba	3	2	1	10	6	3	2.000	222	193	1.150	Quarterfinals
3	Venezuela	3	2	1	8	6	5	1.200	263	242	1.087	Quarterfinals
4	Bahamas	3	0	3	1	1	9	0.111	155	246	0.630	5th–8th place

Date	Time		Score		Set 1	Set 2	Set 3	Set 4	Set 5	Total	Report
25 Nov	16:00	Cuba	3–0	Bahamas	25–22	25–16	25–15			75–53	
25 Nov	21:00	Puerto Rico	1–3	Venezuela	20–25	23–25	25–23	27-29		95–73	
26 Nov	14:00	Puerto Rico	3–0	Bahamas	25–12	25–15	25–10			75–37	
26 Nov	21:00	Cuba	3–0	Venezuela	30–28	25–18	25–19			80–65	
27 Nov	16:00	Venezuela	3–1	Bahamas	25–12	21–25	25–13	25-17		96–50	
27 Nov	21:00	Cuba	0–3	Puerto Rico	19–25	23–25	25–27			67–77	

=== Final round ===
==== Championship bracket ====
Quarterfinals
B2	Cuba	3
A3	Colombia	0
A2	Mexico	3
B3	Venezuela	2

Semifinals
A1	Dominican Republic	3
B2	Cuba	1
B1	Puerto Rico	3
A2	Mexico	1

Finals
A1	Dominican Republic	3
B1	Puerto Rico	2
Third place
A2	Mexico	0
B2	Cuba	3

==== 5th to 8th places bracket ====
Classification 5-8
A4	Trinidad and Tobago	0
B3	Venezuela	3
B4	Bahamas	3
A3	Colombia	0

Classification 7–8
A4	Trinidad and Tobago	0
A3	Colombia	3
Classification 5-6
B3	Venezuela	3
B4	Bahamas	0

==== Quarterfinals ====
Date	Time		Score		Set 1	Set 2	Set 3	Set 4	Set 5	Total	Report
28 Nov	19:00	Cuba	3–0	Colombia	25–18	26–24	25–22			76–64	
28 Nov	21:05	Mexico	3–2	Venezuela	25–22	24–26	23–25	25-23	27-25	124–73	

==== Classification 5–8 ====
Date	Time		Score		Set 1	Set 2	Set 3	Set 4	Set 5	Total	Report
29 Nov	14:00	Trinidad and Tobago	0–3	Venezuela	22–25	15–25	21–25			58–75	
29 Nov	16:00	Bahamas	3–0	Colombia	32–30	27–25	25–19			84–74	

==== Semifinals ====
Date	Time		Score		Set 1	Set 2	Set 3	Set 4	Set 5	Total	Report
29 Nov	19:00	Dominican Republic	3–1	Cuba	25–23	25–20	14–25	25-20		89–68	
29 Nov	21:22	Puerto Rico	3–1	Mexico	25–21	25–21	23–25	25-14		98–67	

==== Classification 7–8 ====
Date	Time		Score		Set 1	Set 2	Set 3	Set 4	Set 5	Total	Report
30 Nov	10:00	Trinidad and Tobago	0–3	Colombia	15–25	21–25	13–25			49–75	

==== Classification 5–6 ====
Date	Time		Score		Set 1	Set 2	Set 3	Set 4	Set 5	Total	Report
30 Nov	12:00	Venezuela	3–0	Bahamas	25–13	25–13	25–14			75–40	

==== Classification 3–4 ====
Date	Time		Score		Set 1	Set 2	Set 3	Set 4	Set 5	Total	Report
30 Nov	15:00	Cuba	3–0	Mexico	25–19	43–41	25–22			93–82	

==== Final ====
Date	Time		Score		Set 1	Set 2	Set 3	Set 4	Set 5	Total	Report
30 Nov	17:00	Dominican Republic	3–2	Puerto Rico	25–22	23–25	23–25	25-22	24-22	120–72	

=== Final standings ===
Rank	Team
1st place, gold medalist(s)	Dominican Republic
2nd place, silver medalist(s)	Puerto Rico
3rd place, bronze medalist(s)	Cuba
4	Mexico
5	Venezuela
6	Bahamas
7	Colombia
8	Trinidad and Tobago

2014 Central American and Caribbean Games winners

Dominican Republic
First title

=== Individual awards ===
- Most valuable player
  Elvis Contreras (DOM)
- Best scorer
  Elvis Contreras (DOM)
- Best outside spikers
  Elvis Contreras (DOM)
  Javier Jiménez (CUB)
- Best middle blockers
  Wilfrido Hernández (DOM)
  Germán Recio (DOM)
- Best opposite spiker
  José Miguel Cáceres (DOM)
- Best digger
  Pedro Cabrera (PUR)
- Best receiver
  Jorge Quiñones (MEX)
- Best libero
  Jesús Rangel (MEX)
- Best setter
  Leandro Macías (CUB)
- Best server
  Javier Jiménez (CUB)

== Medal table ==
Rank	Nation	Gold	Silver	Bronze	Total
1	Dominican Republic (DOM)	2	0	0	2
2	Puerto Rico (PUR)	0	2	0	2
3	Cuba (CUB)	0	0	2	2
Totals (3 entries)		2	2	2	6
