= Islam Abdelkader =

Egyptian volleyball player (born 1994)

Personal information
- Nationality: Egyptian
- Born: 9 February 1994 (age 32)
- Height: 1.94 m (6 ft 4 in)
- Weight: 85 kg (187 lb)
- Spike: 319 cm (126 in)
- Block: 310 cm (122 in)

Volleyball information
- Number: 2

Career
Years	Teams
2014	(Egypt) El-Gaish

National team
2014	Egypt

Islam Abdelkader (born 9 February 1994) is an Egyptian male volleyball player. He was part of the Egypt men's national volleyball team at the 2014 FIVB Volleyball Men's World Championship in Poland. He played for El-Gaish.

== Clubs ==
- El-Gaish (2014)
