= Harrison Peacock =

Australian volleyball player (born 1991)

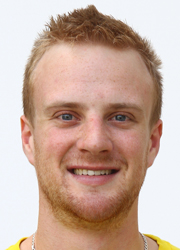
- Peacock in 2012

Personal information
- Nationality: Australian
- Born: 31 January 1991 (age 35)
- Height: 2.05 m (6 ft 9 in)
- Weight: 79 kg (174 lb)

Harrison Peacock (born 31 January 1991) is an Australian volleyball player. He competed for Australia at the 2012 Summer Olympics. He also competed at the 2014 FIVB Volleyball Men's World Championship.

== Early life ==
Peacock began playing volleyball after he watched his older sister Jessica play the game at age 16. From there, he played volleyball throughout primary and high school. As a junior player, he represented Australia at the Youth Beach Volleyball World Championships before receiving an AIS scholarship in 2008 to play indoor volleyball.

In 2013, Peacock suffered from hip dysplasia which required five surgeries. However, he returned to playing volleyball in 2014 and competed in the 2014 FIVB Volleyball Men's World Championship.

In 2018, he joined Adelaide Storm in the Australian Volleyball League. At the time, his brother was also on the team.
