= Nayka Benítez =

Puerto Rican female volleyball player

Nayka Benitez
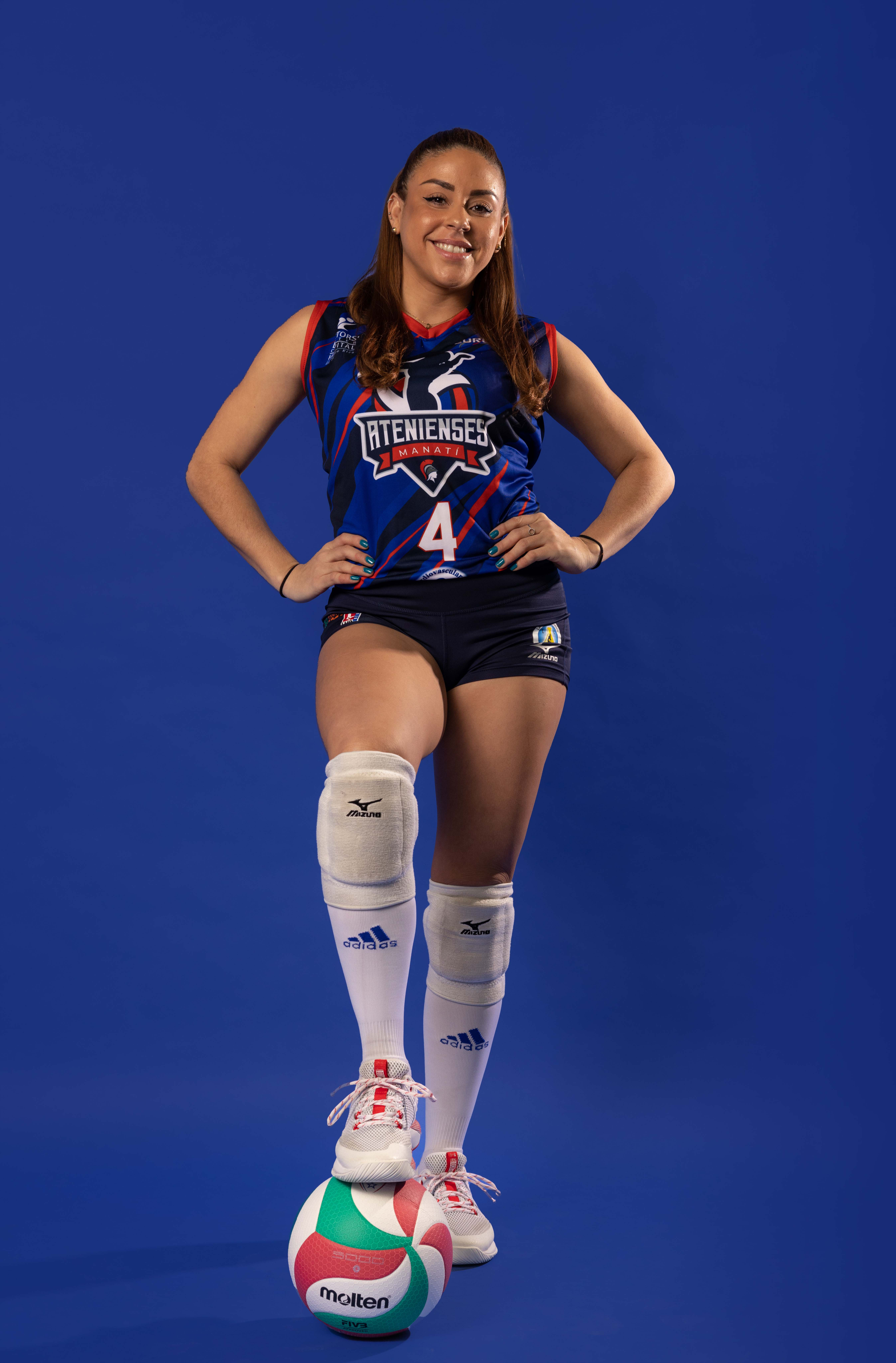
- Benítez in 2023

Personal information
- Full name: Nayka Darlyn Benítez Martínez
- Nationality: Puerto Rican
- Born: 8 February 1989 (age 37); San Juan, Puerto Rico
- Hometown: San Juan, Puerto Rico
- Height: 1.8 m (5 ft 11 in)
- Weight: 66 kg (146 lb)
- Spike: 246 cm (97 in)
- Block: 240 cm (94 in)
- Education: Creighton University

Volleyball information
- Position: Libero
- Current club: Atenienses de Manatí
- Number: 4

National team
Puerto Rico
Honours
Women's volleyball
Representing Puerto Rico
Central American and Caribbean Games
Silver medal – second place	2014 Veracruz	Women's volleyball

Nayka Darlyn Benítez Martínez (born 8 February 1989) is a professional Puerto Rican female volleyball player.

She is a member of the Puerto Rico women's national volleyball team. She was part of the Puerto Rican national team at the XXII Juegos Centroamericanos y del Caribe Veracruz 2014, 2015 Pan American Games, and at the 2015 FIVB World Grand Prix.

She played for Guaynabo 2011, 2012, 2013, 2014 and for Ponce 2015, 2016, 2017. Also went to Creighton University.

== Clubs ==
- (Puerto Rico) Guaynabo Mets
- Leonas de Ponce LVSF
- Atenienses de Manatí LVSF
