= Julián Duarte =

Mexican volleyball player (born 1994)

Personal information
- Nationality: Mexican
- Born: 16 June 1994 (age 32)
- Height: 2.00 m (6 ft 7 in)
- Weight: 79 kg (174 lb)
- Spike: 321 cm (126 in)
- Block: 302 cm (119 in)

Career
| Years | Teams |
|---|---|
| 2014 | Sonora |

National team
| 2014 | Mexico |

Julián Duarte (born 16 June 1994) is a Mexican male volleyball player. He was part of the Mexico men's national volleyball team at the 2014 FIVB Volleyball Men's World Championship in Poland. He played for Sonora.

== Clubs ==
- (Mexico) Sonora (2014)
