= Pedrito Sierra =

Puerto Rican volleyball player (born 1989)

Personal information
- Nationality: Puerto Rico
- Born: 21 July 1989 (age 37)
- Height: 6 ft and 9 in
- Weight: 89 kg (196 lb)
- Spike: 305 cm (120 in)
- Block: 298 cm (117 in)

Volleyball information
- Number: 17

Career
| Years | Teams |
|---|---|
| 2014 | (Puerto Rico) Cariduros de Fajardo |

National team
| 2014 | Puerto Rico |

Pedrito Sierra (born 21 July 1989) is a Puerto Rican male volleyball player. He was part of the Puerto Rico men's national volleyball team at the 2014 FIVB Volleyball Men's World Championship in Poland. He played for Cariduros de Fajardo.

== Clubs ==
- Cariduros de Fajardo (2014)
