= Javier Jiménez (volleyball) =

Cuban volleyball player (born 1989)

Javier Jimenez
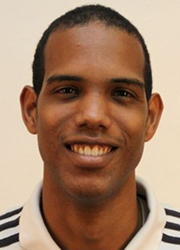

Personal information
- Full name: Javier Ernesto Jimenez Scull
- Nationality: Cuban
- Born: 16 November 1989 (age 36)
- Height: 198 cm (6 ft 6 in)
- Weight: 89 kg (196 lb)
- Spike: 352 cm (139 in)
- Block: 345 cm (136 in)

Volleyball information
- Position: Outside hitter
- Current club: (Romania) SCM U Craiova
- Number: 1

Career
Years	Teams
–2014; 2014–2016; 2016–2017; 2017–2018; 2018–2019; 2019–2020; 2020–2022; 2022–2023; 2023–	(Cuba) Matanzas (Greece) PAOK (Italy) Pallavolo Molfetta (Argentina) Obras UDAP (Greece) PAOK (Estonia) Saaremaa (Spain) Almería (Cyprus) Pafiakos Paphos (Romania) SCM U Craiova

National team
2013–2018	Cuba
Honours
Men's volleyball
Representing Cuba
NORCECA Championship
Silver medal – second place	2015 Mexico
Bronze medal – third place	2013 Canada
Pan American Cup
Gold medal – first place	2014 Mexico
Central American and Caribbean Games
Bronze medal – third place	2014 Mexico
- Last updated: 30 december 2019

Javier Ernesto Jiménez Scull (born November 16, 1989) is a Cuban volleyball player, who plays as an outside hitter for the Cuba men's national volleyball team. On 2014 he became the first Cuban player ever to be transferred to a non-Cuban team (PAOK VC) having acquired at first the approval of the Cuban Sports Ministry. He played for PAOK VC from 2014-2016 having a major contribution to the team's first ever Championship, including the first ever Double (Championship and Cup) on 2015 and the Championship of the 2016 Greek Volleyleague. During his period in Thessaloniki and PAOK VC he was much beloved by the PAOK fans, especially for his way of celebrating points.

== Sporting achievements ==
=== National Championships/Cups ===
- 2014/2015 Greek Championship, with PAOK
- 2014/2015 Greek Cup, with PAOK
- 2015/2016 Greek Championship, with PAOK
- 2019/2020 Estonian Cup 2019, with Saaremaa
