= Jesús Alberto Perales =

Mexican volleyball player (born 1993)

Jesús Alberto Perales González
Personal information
- Nicknames: Chuy, Príncipe
- Nationality: Mexican
- Born: 22 December 1993 (age 32) Monterrey
- Home town: Monterrey
- Education: University of Monterrey; University of Liverpool
- Height: 1.97 m (6 ft 6 in)
- Weight: 90 kg (198 lb)
- Spike: 343 cm (135 in)
- Block: 326 cm (128 in)

Volleyball information
- Position: Setter, Opposite
- Current club: (Portugal) Famalicense Atletico Clube
- Number: 6

Career
- Years: Team
- 2012-2016 2014–2015 2015–2016 2017-2018 2018-2019: (Mexico) Universidad de Monterrey (Mexico) Halcones (Mexico) Virtus (England) University of Liverpool (Portugal) Famalicense Atletico Clube

National team
- Years: Team
- 2014-2019: Mexico
Honours
Representing Mexico
Men's Volleyball
- 2018 Central American and Caribbean Games

Jesús Alberto Perales (born 22 December 1993) is a Mexican male volleyball player. He was part of the Mexico men's national volleyball team at the Olympic Games 2016.

== Career ==
During the summer of 2016, Perales along with Mexico men's national volleyball team, qualified for the first time in history to the Olympic Games through the World Olympic Qualification Tournament, which took place in their home turf in Mexico City.

== Clubs ==
- Halcones (2014)
- Virtus Guanajuato (2015–2016)
- University of Liverpool (2017–2018
- Famalicense Atletico Clube (2018–2019)
