= Jazmin Hernández =

Mexican volleyball player

Personal information
- Nationality: Mexico
- Born: 18 September 1989 (age 37)
- Height: 1.75 m (5 ft 9 in)
- Weight: 70 kg (150 lb)
- Spike: 295 cm (116 in)
- Block: 287 cm (113 in)

Volleyball information
- Number: 18

Career
Years	Teams
2014	(Mexico) Nuevo León

Jazmin Hernández (born 18 September 1989) is a Mexican female volleyball player. She is a member of the Mexico women's national volleyball team and played for Nuevo León in 2014. She was part of the Mexico national team at the 2014 FIVB Volleyball Women's World Championship in Italy.

== Clubs ==
- (Mexico) Nuevo León (2014)
