= Claudia Reséndiz =

Mexican volleyball player (born 1994)

Personal information
- Full name: Claudia Lizbeth Reséndiz López
- Nationality: Mexico
- Born: 21 May 1994 (age 32)
- Height: 1.72 m (5 ft 8 in)
- Weight: 72 kg (159 lb)
- Spike: 268 cm (106 in)
- Block: 260 cm (100 in)

Volleyball information
- Number: 3

Career
Years	Teams
2014	JALISCO

Claudia Lizbeth Reséndiz López (born 21 May 1994) is a Mexican female volleyball player. She is a member of the Mexico women's national volleyball team and played for Jalisco in 2014.

She was part of the Mexico national team at the 2014 FIVB Volleyball Women's World Championship in Italy.

== Clubs ==
- Jalisco (2014)
