= David Fiel =

Cuban volleyball player (born 1993)

Personal information
- Full name: David Fiel Rodriguez
- Born: 28 August 1993 (age 33) Havana, Cuba
- Height: 2.06 m (6 ft 9 in)
- Weight: 100 kg (220 lb)
- Spike: 374 cm (147 in)
- Block: 360 cm (142 in)

Volleyball information
- Position: Middle blocker
- Current club: (France) Cambrai Volley-Ball
- Number: 15

Career
- Years: Team
- 2012–2013 2013–2014 2016–2017 2018–2019 2019–2020 2020–2021 2021–: (Cuba) Capitalinos (Cuba) La Habana (Qatar) El Jaish (Poland) Skra Bełchatów (France) Tourcoing LM (Germany) VfB Friedrichshafen (France) Paris Volley

National team
- Years: Team
- 2011–2014, 2025: Cuba
Honours
Men's volleyball
Representing Cuba
FIVB World League
Bronze medal – third place	2012 Sofia
Pan American Cup
Gold medal – first place	2014 Tijuana
NORCECA Championship
Bronze medal – third place	2013 Canada

David Fiel Rodriguez (born 28 August 1993) is a Cuban volleyball player and a Cuban national volleyball team member. At the professional club level, he plays for the Russian team, [Kuzbass, Kemerovo].

== Sporting achievements ==
=== Clubs ===
- National championships
  - 2016/2017 Qatari Championship, with El Jaish
  - 2018/2019 Polish SuperCup, with PGE Skra Bełchatów
  - 2020/2021 German Championship, with VfB Friedrichshafen

=== Individual awards ===
- 2014: Pan American Cup – Best Middle Blocker
