= Félix Chapman =

Cuban volleyball player (born 1996)

Personal information
- Full name: Félix Emilio Chapman Piñeiro
- Nationality: Cuban
- Born: October 5, 1996 (age 30)
- Height: 2.00 m (6 ft 7 in)
- Weight: 84 kg (185 lb)
- Spike: 350 cm (138 in)
- Block: 330 cm (130 in)
- Education: Universidad del Turabo

Volleyball information
- Position: Middle blocker

Career
Years	Teams
2014	Mayabeque

National team
2014–2015	Cuba
Honours
Men's volleyball
Representing Cuba
Central American and Caribbean Games
Bronze medal – third place	2014 Mexico

Félix Emilio Chapman Piñeiro (born October 5, 1996) is a Cuban volleyball player. He was part of the Cuban men's national volleyball team at the 2014 FIVB World Championship in Poland.

== Defection ==
Along with Inovel Romero, he defected to the United States after they won the bronze medal in the 2015 NORCECA Champions Cup in Detroit, Michigan, and asked for political asylum.

== Clubs ==
- Mayabeque (2014)
