= Inovel Romero =

Cuban volleyball player (born 1995)

Personal information
- Full name: Inovel Romero Valdes
- Nationality: Cuban
- Born: January 28, 1995 (age 31)
- Height: 1.97 m (6 ft 6 in)
- Weight: 80 kg (176 lb)
- Spike: 350 cm (138 in)
- Block: 335 cm (132 in)
- Education: Universidad Metropolitana

Volleyball information
- Position: Wing spiker

Career
Years	Teams
2014	Ciego de Ávila

National team
2012–2015	Cuba
Honours
Men's volleyball
Representing Cuba
Central American and Caribbean Games
Bronze medal – third place	2014 Mexico

Inovel Romero Valdes (born January 28, 1995) is a Cuban male volleyball player. He was part of the Cuba men's national volleyball team at the 2014 FIVB Volleyball Men's World Championship in Poland.

== Defection ==
Along with Félix Chapman, he defected in the United States after they won the bronze medal in the 2015 NORCECA Champions Cup in Detroit, Michigan, asking Political asylum in that country.

== Clubs ==
- Ciego de Ávila (2014)
