= Legna Hernández =

Puerto Rican volleyball player (born 1991)

Personal information
- Full name: Legna Janette Hernández Hernández
- Nationality: Puerto Rico
- Born: 18 July 1991 (age 35); Camuy, Puerto Rico
- Height: 1.78 m (5 ft 10 in)
- Weight: 66 kg (146 lb)
- Spike: 278 cm (109 in)
- Block: 272 cm (107 in)

Career
| Years | Teams |
|---|---|
| 2014 | Leonas de Ponce |
| 2018 | Al Muharraq |

National team
| 2014 | Puerto Rico |

Legna Hernández (born 18 July 1991 in Camuy, Puerto Rico) is a Puerto Rican female volleyball player. She is part of the Puerto Rico women's national volleyball team.

== Career ==
She participated in the 2014 FIVB Volleyball World Grand Prix. On club level she played for Leonas de Ponce in 2014.

Hernández played the 2018 Arab Women Sports Tournament with the club from Bahrain Al Muharraq.
