= Mannix Román =

Puerto Rican volleyball player (born 1983)

Personal information
- Nationality: Puerto Rico
- Born: 17 January 1983 (age 43)
- Height: 1.90 m (6 ft 3 in)
- Weight: 85 kg (187 lb)
- Spike: 295 cm (116 in)
- Block: 288 cm (113 in)

Volleyball information
- Number: 14

Career
Years	Teams
2014	(Puerto Rico) Mets de Guaynabo

National team
2014	Puerto Rico

Mannix Román (born 17 January 1983) is a Puerto Rican volleyball player. He was part of the Puerto Rico men's national volleyball team at the 2014 FIVB Volleyball Men's World Championship in Poland. He played for Mets de Guaynabo.

== Clubs ==
- Mets de Guaynabo (2014)
