= Volleyball at the 2008 Summer Olympics – Women's team rosters =

This article shows the rosters of all participating teams at the women's volleyball tournament at the 2008 Summer Olympics in Beijing.

== Group A ==
=== China ===
The following is the Chinese roster in the women's volleyball tournament of the 2008 Summer Olympics.

Head coach: Chen Zhonghe

№	Name	Date of birth	Height	Weight	Spike	Block	2008 club
1	Wang Yimei	11 January 1988	1.90 m (6 ft 3 in)	90 kg (200 lb)	318 cm (125 in)	305 cm (120 in)	(China) Liaoning
2	Feng Kun (c)	28 December 1978	1.83 m (6 ft 0 in)	75 kg (165 lb)	319 cm (126 in)	310 cm (120 in)	(China) Beijing
3	Yang Hao	21 March 1980	1.83 m (6 ft 0 in)	75 kg (165 lb)	319 cm (126 in)	314 cm (124 in)	(China) Liaoning
4	Liu Yanan	29 September 1980	1.86 m (6 ft 1 in)	73 kg (161 lb)	320 cm (130 in)	313 cm (123 in)	(China) Liaoning
5	Wei Qiuyue	26 September 1988	1.82 m (6 ft 0 in)	65 kg (143 lb)	305 cm (120 in)	300 cm (120 in)	(China) Tianjin
6	Xu Yunli	2 August 1987	1.94 m (6 ft 4 in)	75 kg (165 lb)	313 cm (123 in)	306 cm (120 in)	(China) Fujian
7	Zhou Suhong	23 April 1979	1.82 m (6 ft 0 in)	73 kg (161 lb)	313 cm (123 in)	305 cm (120 in)	(China) Zhejiang
9	Zhao Ruirui	8 October 1981	1.98 m (6 ft 6 in)	70 kg (150 lb)	326 cm (128 in)	315 cm (124 in)	(China) Army
10	Xue Ming	23 February 1987	1.92 m (6 ft 4 in)	68 kg (150 lb)	322 cm (127 in)	310 cm (120 in)	(China) Beijing
11	Li Juan	15 May 1981	1.85 m (6 ft 1 in)	73 kg (161 lb)	315 cm (124 in)	307 cm (121 in)	(China) Tianjin
16	Zhang Na (L)	19 April 1980	1.80 m (5 ft 11 in)	72 kg (159 lb)	302 cm (119 in)	292 cm (115 in)	(China) Tianjin
17	Ma Yunwen	19 October 1986	1.89 m (6 ft 2 in)	70 kg (150 lb)	315 cm (124 in)	307 cm (121 in)	(China) Shanghai

=== Cuba ===
The following is the Cuban roster in the women's volleyball tournament of the 2008 Summer Olympics.

Head Coach: Antonio Perdomo

№	Name	Date of birth	Height	Weight	Spike	Block	2008 club
1	Yumilka Ruíz (c)	8 May 1978	1.79 m (5 ft 10 in)	63 kg (139 lb)	326 cm (128 in)	305 cm (120 in)	(Cuba) Camagüey
2	Yanelis Santos	30 March 1986	1.80 m (5 ft 11 in)	69 kg (152 lb)	324 cm (128 in)	304 cm (120 in)	(Cuba) Ciego de Ávila
3	Nancy Carrillo	11 January 1986	1.90 m (6 ft 3 in)	74 kg (163 lb)	320 cm (130 in)	315 cm (124 in)	(Cuba) Ciudad Habana
6	Daimí Ramírez	8 October 1983	1.81 m (5 ft 11 in)	67 kg (148 lb)	305 cm (120 in)	290 cm (110 in)	(Cuba) Camagüey
8	Yaima Ortíz (L)	9 November 1981	1.78 m (5 ft 10 in)	72 kg (159 lb)	326 cm (128 in)	303 cm (119 in)	(Cuba) Ciudad Habana
9	Rachel Sánchez	9 January 1989	1.88 m (6 ft 2 in)	75 kg (165 lb)	315 cm (124 in)	305 cm (120 in)	(Cuba) Pinar del Río
10	Yusleynis Herrera	12 March 1984	1.78 m (5 ft 10 in)	63 kg (139 lb)	325 cm (128 in)	305 cm (120 in)	(Cuba) Ciudad Habana
11	Liana Mesa	26 December 1977	1.83 m (6 ft 0 in)	73 kg (161 lb)	316 cm (124 in)	300 cm (120 in)	(Cuba) Camagüey
12	Rosir Calderón	28 December 1984	1.90 m (6 ft 3 in)	70 kg (150 lb)	330 cm (130 in)	307 cm (121 in)	(Cuba) Ciudad Habana
14	Kenia Carcaces	23 January 1986	1.90 m (6 ft 3 in)	69 kg (152 lb)	310 cm (120 in)	306 cm (120 in)	(Cuba) Holguín
15	Yusidey Silié	11 November 1984	1.84 m (6 ft 0 in)	75 kg (165 lb)	315 cm (124 in)	307 cm (121 in)	(Cuba) Ciudad Habana
18	Zoila Barros	6 August 1976	1.88 m (6 ft 2 in)	72 kg (159 lb)	328 cm (129 in)	307 cm (121 in)	(Cuba) Ciudad Habana

=== Japan ===
The following is the Japanese roster in the women's volleyball tournament of the 2008 Summer Olympics.

Head Coach: Shoichi Yanagimoto

№	Name	Date of birth	Height	Weight	Spike	Block	2008 club
1	Megumi Kurihara	31 July 1984	1.88 m (6 ft 2 in)	69 kg (152 lb)	305 cm (120 in)	285 cm (112 in)	(Japan) Pioneer Red Wings
2	Asako Tajimi	26 June 1972	1.80 m (5 ft 11 in)	70 kg (150 lb)	309 cm (122 in)	304 cm (120 in)	(Japan) Pioneer Red Wings
3	Yoshie Takeshita (c)	18 March 1978	1.59 m (5 ft 3 in)	52 kg (115 lb)	280 cm (110 in)	270 cm (110 in)	(Japan) JT Marvelous
4	Kanako Omura	15 December 1976	1.84 m (6 ft 0 in)	70 kg (150 lb)	319 cm (126 in)	310 cm (120 in)	(Japan) Hisamitsu Springs
5	Miyuki Takahashi	25 December 1978	1.70 m (5 ft 7 in)	65 kg (143 lb)	290 cm (110 in)	285 cm (112 in)	(Japan) NEC Red Rockets
6	Yuko Sano (L)	26 July 1979	1.59 m (5 ft 3 in)	54 kg (119 lb)	260 cm (100 in)	250 cm (98 in)	(Japan) Hisamitsu Springs
7	Sachiko Sugiyama	19 October 1979	1.84 m (6 ft 0 in)	66 kg (146 lb)	310 cm (120 in)	305 cm (120 in)	(Japan) NEC Red Rockets
8	Yuka Sakurai	2 September 1974	1.67 m (5 ft 6 in)	63 kg (139 lb)	290 cm (110 in)	275 cm (108 in)	(Japan) Denso Airybees
9	Miyuki Kano	17 May 1977	1.74 m (5 ft 9 in)	65 kg (143 lb)	298 cm (117 in)	275 cm (108 in)	(Japan) Hisamitsu Springs
11	Erika Araki	3 August 1984	1.86 m (6 ft 1 in)	79 kg (174 lb)	307 cm (121 in)	298 cm (117 in)	(Japan) Toray Arrows
12	Saori Kimura	19 August 1986	1.85 m (6 ft 1 in)	66 kg (146 lb)	298 cm (117 in)	293 cm (115 in)	(Japan) Toray Arrows
14	Yuki Kawai	22 January 1990	1.68 m (5 ft 6 in)	63 kg (139 lb)	280 cm (110 in)	275 cm (108 in)	(Japan) JT Marvelous

=== Poland ===
The following is the Polish roster in the women's volleyball tournament of the 2008 Summer Olympics.

Head Coach: (Italy) Marco Bonitta

№	Name	Date of birth	Height	Weight	Spike	Block	2008 club
1	Katarzyna Skowrońska	30 June 1983	1.89 m (6 ft 2 in)	75 kg (165 lb)	314 cm (124 in)	296 cm (117 in)	(Italy) Asystel Novara
2	Mariola Zenik (L)	3 July 1982	1.74 m (5 ft 9 in)	64 kg (141 lb)	300 cm (120 in)	290 cm (110 in)	(Poland) Muszynianka Muszyna
4	Katarzyna Gajgał	21 September 1981	1.90 m (6 ft 3 in)	85 kg (187 lb)	300 cm (120 in)	287 cm (113 in)	(Poland) BKS Bielsko-Biała
6	Anna Podolec	30 October 1985	1.95 m (6 ft 5 in)	71 kg (157 lb)	318 cm (125 in)	305 cm (120 in)	(Russia) Balakovskaia AES Balakovo
7	Małgorzata Glinka	30 September 1978	1.93 m (6 ft 4 in)	84 kg (185 lb)	314 cm (124 in)	303 cm (119 in)	(Spain) Grupo 2002 Murcia
9	Agnieszka Bednarek	20 February 1986	1.85 m (6 ft 1 in)	70 kg (150 lb)	309 cm (122 in)	292 cm (115 in)	(Poland) PTPS Nafta Gaz Piła
11	Anna Barańska	15 May 1984	1.79 m (5 ft 10 in)	66 kg (146 lb)	308 cm (121 in)	292 cm (115 in)	(Poland) Winiary Kalisz
12	Milena Sadurek	18 October 1984	1.77 m (5 ft 10 in)	65 kg (143 lb)	302 cm (119 in)	295 cm (116 in)	(Poland) BKS Bielsko-Biała
13	Milena Rosner (c)	4 January 1980	1.79 m (5 ft 10 in)	67 kg (148 lb)	307 cm (121 in)	292 cm (115 in)	(Italy) Foppapedretti Bergamo
14	Maria Liktoras	20 February 1975	1.92 m (6 ft 4 in)	73 kg (161 lb)	312 cm (123 in)	302 cm (119 in)	(Russia) Dynamo Moscow
17	Joanna Kaczor	16 September 1984	1.93 m (6 ft 4 in)	64 kg (141 lb)	305 cm (120 in)	290 cm (110 in)	(Poland) Impel Gwardia
18	Katarzyna Skorupa	16 September 1984	1.84 m (6 ft 0 in)	69 kg (152 lb)	302 cm (119 in)	296 cm (117 in)	(Poland) PTPS Piła

=== United States ===
The following is the American roster in the women's volleyball tournament of the 2008 Summer Olympics.

Head Coach: (China) Lang Ping

№	Name	Date of birth	Height	Weight	Spike	Block	2008 club
1	Ogonna Nnamani	29 July 1983	1.83 m (6 ft 0 in)	80 kg (180 lb)	315 cm (124 in)	305 cm (120 in)	(Italy) Asystel Novara
2	Danielle Scott-Arruda	1 October 1972	1.88 m (6 ft 2 in)	84 kg (185 lb)	325 cm (128 in)	302 cm (119 in)	(Italy) Florens Castellana
3	Tayyiba Haneef-Park	23 March 1979	2.00 m (6 ft 7 in)	82 kg (181 lb)	328 cm (129 in)	312 cm (123 in)	(Turkey) Eczacıbaşı Zentiva
4	Lindsey Berg	16 July 1980	1.73 m (5 ft 8 in)	75 kg (165 lb)	287 cm (113 in)	274 cm (108 in)	(Italy) Asystel Novara
5	Stacy Sykora (L)	24 June 1977	1.76 m (5 ft 9 in)	61 kg (134 lb)	305 cm (120 in)	295 cm (116 in)	(Italy) Lines Ecocapitanata Altamura
6	Nicole Davis (L)	24 April 1982	1.67 m (5 ft 6 in)	73 kg (161 lb)	284 cm (112 in)	266 cm (105 in)	(Turkey) Fenerbahçe
7	Heather Bown	29 November 1978	1.88 m (6 ft 2 in)	90 kg (200 lb)	301 cm (119 in)	290 cm (110 in)	(Italy) Marche Jesi
9	Jennifer Joines	23 November 1982	1.91 m (6 ft 3 in)	82 kg (181 lb)	315 cm (124 in)	301 cm (119 in)	(Japan) Toyota Auto Body Queenseis
10	Kim Glass	18 August 1984	1.90 m (6 ft 3 in)	75 kg (165 lb)	314 cm (124 in)	299 cm (118 in)	(Turkey) Fenerbahçe
11	Robyn Ah Mow-Santos (c)	15 September 1975	1.72 m (5 ft 8 in)	67 kg (148 lb)	291 cm (115 in)	281 cm (111 in)	(Switzerland) Voléro Zürich
12	Kim Willoughby	7 November 1980	1.78 m (5 ft 10 in)	75 kg (165 lb)	315 cm (124 in)	300 cm (120 in)	(Italy) Famila Chieri
15	Logan Tom	25 May 1981	1.84 m (6 ft 0 in)	80 kg (180 lb)	315 cm (124 in)	297 cm (117 in)	(Russia) Dynamo Moscow

=== Venezuela ===
The following is the Venezuelan roster in the women's volleyball tournament of the 2008 Summer Olympics.

Head Coach: (Cuba) Tomas Fernández

№	Name	Date of birth	Height	Weight	Spike	Block	2008 club
1	Yessica Paz	7 October 1989	1.92 m (6 ft 4 in)	72 kg (159 lb)	304 cm (120 in)	300 cm (120 in)	(Venezuela) Aragua
5	Génesis Franchesco	6 May 1990	1.74 m (5 ft 9 in)	58 kg (128 lb)	236 cm (93 in)	232 cm (91 in)	(Venezuela) Miranda
6	Maria Valero (L)	18 September 1991	1.65 m (5 ft 5 in)	60 kg (130 lb)	245 cm (96 in)	242 cm (95 in)	(Venezuela) Barinas
8	Amarilis Villar	30 March 1984	1.78 m (5 ft 10 in)	70 kg (150 lb)	280 cm (110 in)	276 cm (109 in)	(Venezuela) Vargas
9	Jayce Andrade (c)	19 May 1984	1.88 m (6 ft 2 in)	72 kg (159 lb)	300 cm (120 in)	296 cm (117 in)	(Venezuela) Zulia
10	Desiree Glod	28 September 1982	1.76 m (5 ft 9 in)	64 kg (141 lb)	305 cm (120 in)	301 cm (119 in)	(Spain) Ícaro Alaró
12	Gheraldine Quijada	31 January 1988	1.79 m (5 ft 10 in)	65 kg (143 lb)	286 cm (113 in)	282 cm (111 in)	(Venezuela) D.C.
13	Shirley Florian	27 July 1991	1.91 m (6 ft 3 in)	67 kg (148 lb)	305 cm (120 in)	301 cm (119 in)	(Venezuela) Zulia
14	Aleoscar Blanco	18 July 1987	1.89 m (6 ft 2 in)	75 kg (165 lb)	300 cm (120 in)	296 cm (117 in)	(Venezuela) Vargas
15	María José Pérez	18 March 1988	1.88 m (6 ft 2 in)	69 kg (152 lb)	300 cm (120 in)	296 cm (117 in)	(Puerto Rico) Llaneras de Toa Baja
17	Roslandy Acosta	25 February 1992	1.90 m (6 ft 3 in)	62 kg (137 lb)	295 cm (116 in)	291 cm (115 in)	(Venezuela) Vargas
18	Wendy Romero	8 February 1992	1.78 m (5 ft 10 in)	71 kg (157 lb)	295 cm (116 in)	291 cm (115 in)	(Venezuela) Cojedes

== Group B ==
=== Algeria ===
The following is the Algerian roster in the women's volleyball tournament of the 2008 Summer Olympics.

Head Coach: Mouloud Ikhedji

№	Name	Date of birth	Height	Weight	Spike	Block	2008 club
1	Mélinda Hennaoui	18 March 1990	1.75 m (5 ft 9 in)	68 kg (150 lb)	288 cm (113 in)	270 cm (110 in)	(France) Istres Volleyball
2	Sehryne Hanaoui	10 January 1988	1.72 m (5 ft 8 in)	69 kg (152 lb)	280 cm (110 in)	266 cm (105 in)	(France) Istres Volleyball
4	Nassima Ben Hamouda	20 October 1973	1.80 m (5 ft 11 in)	67 kg (148 lb)	299 cm (118 in)	287 cm (113 in)	(Algeria) GSP Algiers
7	Raouia Rouabhia	25 June 1978	1.78 m (5 ft 10 in)	67 kg (148 lb)	296 cm (117 in)	286 cm (113 in)	(France) Venelle
9	Narimène Madani (c)	12 March 1984	1.76 m (5 ft 9 in)	62 kg (137 lb)	298 cm (117 in)	287 cm (113 in)	(Algeria) NC Bejaïa
10	Fatima-Zohra Oukazi	18 January 1984	1.75 m (5 ft 9 in)	67 kg (148 lb)	295 cm (116 in)	283 cm (111 in)	(Algeria) GSP Algiers
11	Mouni Abderrahim	19 November 1985	1.73 m (5 ft 8 in)	60 kg (130 lb)	300 cm (120 in)	290 cm (110 in)	(Algeria) ASW Bejaïa
12	Safia Boukhima	10 January 1991	1.76 m (5 ft 9 in)	64 kg (141 lb)	294 cm (116 in)	284 cm (112 in)	(Algeria) ASW Bejaïa
13	Nawal Mansouri (L)	1 August 1985	1.72 m (5 ft 8 in)	65 kg (143 lb)	291 cm (115 in)	281 cm (111 in)	(Algeria) NC Bejaïa
14	Faïza Tsabet	22 March 1985	1.83 m (6 ft 0 in)	79 kg (174 lb)	305 cm (120 in)	286 cm (113 in)	(France) Istres Volleyball
17	Lydia Oulmou	2 February 1986	1.86 m (6 ft 1 in)	70 kg (150 lb)	305 cm (120 in)	294 cm (116 in)	(France) Istres Volleyball
18	Tassadit Aïssou	19 June 1989	1.83 m (6 ft 0 in)	70 kg (150 lb)	295 cm (116 in)	285 cm (112 in)	(Algeria) ASW Bejaïa

=== Brazil ===
The following is the Brazilian roster in the women's volleyball tournament of the 2008 Summer Olympics.

Head Coach: José Roberto Guimarães

№	Name	Date of birth	Height	Weight	Spike	Block	2008 club
1	Walewska Oliveira	1 October 1979	1.90 m (6 ft 3 in)	73 kg (161 lb)	310 cm (120 in)	290 cm (110 in)	(Spain) CAV Murcia
2	Carolina Albuquerque	25 July 1977	1.82 m (6 ft 0 in)	76 kg (168 lb)	289 cm (114 in)	279 cm (110 in)	(Brazil) Finasa
3	Marianne Steinbrecher	23 August 1983	1.89 m (6 ft 2 in)	70 kg (150 lb)	310 cm (120 in)	290 cm (110 in)	(Italy) Scavolini Pesaro
4	Paula Pequeno	22 January 1982	1.84 m (6 ft 0 in)	74 kg (163 lb)	302 cm (119 in)	285 cm (112 in)	(Brazil) Finasa
6	Thaísa Menezes	15 May 1987	1.96 m (6 ft 5 in)	79 kg (174 lb)	316 cm (124 in)	301 cm (119 in)	(Brazil) Rexona Ades
7	Hélia Souza (c)	3 October 1970	1.75 m (5 ft 9 in)	63 kg (139 lb)	283 cm (111 in)	264 cm (104 in)	(Spain) CAV Murcia
8	Valeska Menezes	23 April 1976	1.80 m (5 ft 11 in)	62 kg (137 lb)	302 cm (119 in)	290 cm (110 in)	(Italy) Asystel Novara
9	Fabiana Claudino	24 January 1985	1.94 m (6 ft 4 in)	76 kg (168 lb)	314 cm (124 in)	293 cm (115 in)	(Brazil) Rexona Ades
10	Wélissa Gonzaga	9 September 1982	1.80 m (5 ft 11 in)	76 kg (168 lb)	300 cm (120 in)	287 cm (113 in)	(Brazil) Rexona Ades
12	Jaqueline Carvalho	31 December 1983	1.86 m (6 ft 1 in)	70 kg (150 lb)	302 cm (119 in)	286 cm (113 in)	(Spain) CAV Murcia
13	Sheilla Castro	1 July 1983	1.86 m (6 ft 1 in)	64 kg (141 lb)	302 cm (119 in)	284 cm (112 in)	(Italy) Scavolini Pesaro
14	Fabiana de Oliveira (L)	7 March 1980	1.68 m (5 ft 6 in)	59 kg (130 lb)	276 cm (109 in)	266 cm (105 in)	(Brazil) Rexona Ades

=== Italy ===
The following is the Italian roster in the women's volleyball tournament of the 2008 Summer Olympics.

Head Coach: Massimo Barbolini

№	Name	Date of birth	Height	Weight	Spike	Block	2008 club
1	Paola Croce	6 March 1978	1.67 m (5 ft 6 in)	52 kg (115 lb)	290 cm (110 in)	265 cm (104 in)	(Italy) Volley Bergamo
3	Nadia Centoni	19 June 1981	1.84 m (6 ft 0 in)	63 kg (139 lb)	307 cm (121 in)	291 cm (115 in)	(France) RC Cannes
5	Martina Guiggi	1 May 1984	1.87 m (6 ft 2 in)	69 kg (152 lb)	315 cm (124 in)	290 cm (110 in)	(Italy) Scavolini Pesaro
6	Jenny Barazza	24 July 1981	1.88 m (6 ft 2 in)	77 kg (170 lb)	300 cm (120 in)	285 cm (112 in)	(Italy) Volley Bergamo
7	Manuela Secolo	22 February 1977	1.80 m (5 ft 11 in)	70 kg (150 lb)	302 cm (119 in)	279 cm (110 in)	(Italy) Famila Chieri
8	Paola Cardullo (L)	18 March 1982	1.62 m (5 ft 4 in)	56 kg (123 lb)	275 cm (108 in)	268 cm (106 in)	(Italy) Asystel Novara
9	Serena Ortolani	7 January 1987	1.86 m (6 ft 1 in)	63 kg (139 lb)	308 cm (121 in)	288 cm (113 in)	(Italy) Yamamay Busto Arsizio
11	Francesca Piccinini	10 January 1979	1.84 m (6 ft 0 in)	75 kg (165 lb)	304 cm (120 in)	279 cm (110 in)	(Italy) Volley Bergamo
12	Francesca Ferretti	15 February 1984	1.80 m (5 ft 11 in)	70 kg (150 lb)	296 cm (117 in)	280 cm (110 in)	(Italy) Scavolini Pesaro
14	Eleonora Lo Bianco (c)	22 December 1979	1.71 m (5 ft 7 in)	70 kg (150 lb)	287 cm (113 in)	273 cm (107 in)	(Italy) Volley Bergamo
15	Taismary Agüero	5 March 1977	1.78 m (5 ft 10 in)	69 kg (152 lb)	322 cm (127 in)	300 cm (120 in)	(Turkey) Türk Telekom Ankara
16	Simona Gioli	17 September 1977	1.84 m (6 ft 0 in)	72 kg (159 lb)	307 cm (121 in)	283 cm (111 in)	(Italy) Despar Sirio Perugia

=== Kazakhstan ===
The following is the Kazakh roster in the women's volleyball tournament of the 2008 Summer Olympics.

Head Coach: Viktor Zhuravlyev

№	Name	Date of birth	Height	Weight	Spike	Block	2008 club
1	Natalya Zhukova	29 March 1980	1.84 m (6 ft 0 in)	70 kg (150 lb)	305 cm (120 in)	285 cm (112 in)	(Turkey) Iller Bankasi
2	Tatyana Pyurova	5 April 1983	1.82 m (6 ft 0 in)	67 kg (148 lb)	305 cm (120 in)	295 cm (116 in)	(Kazakhstan) Zhetyssu
4	Olga Karpova	10 June 1980	1.85 m (6 ft 1 in)	64 kg (141 lb)	300 cm (120 in)	290 cm (110 in)	(Kazakhstan) Rahat
5	Yuliya Kutsko	18 April 1980	1.91 m (6 ft 3 in)	74 kg (163 lb)	305 cm (120 in)	295 cm (116 in)	(Kazakhstan) Rahat
6	Olga Nasedkina	28 December 1982	1.91 m (6 ft 3 in)	75 kg (165 lb)	305 cm (120 in)	295 cm (116 in)	(Kazakhstan) Rahat
8	Korinna Ishimtseva	8 February 1984	1.84 m (6 ft 0 in)	73 kg (161 lb)	280 cm (110 in)	275 cm (108 in)	(Kazakhstan) Rahat
9	Kseniya Ilyuchshenko	29 May 1979	1.80 m (5 ft 11 in)	70 kg (150 lb)	300 cm (120 in)	250 cm (98 in)	(Turkey) Iller Bankasi
10	Yelena Ezau (L)	9 March 1983	1.75 m (5 ft 9 in)	55 kg (121 lb)	285 cm (112 in)	275 cm (108 in)	(Kazakhstan) Rahat
11	Olga Grushko	7 April 1976	1.80 m (5 ft 11 in)	70 kg (150 lb)	305 cm (120 in)	295 cm (116 in)	(Turkey) Marmaris
12	Irina Zaitseva	25 September 1982	1.85 m (6 ft 1 in)	66 kg (146 lb)	305 cm (120 in)	290 cm (110 in)	(Kazakhstan) Rahat
13	Yelena Pavlova (c)	12 December 1978	1.84 m (6 ft 0 in)	70 kg (150 lb)	315 cm (124 in)	290 cm (110 in)	(Japan) Hisamitsu Springs
16	Inna Matveyeva	12 October 1978	1.86 m (6 ft 1 in)	74 kg (163 lb)	305 cm (120 in)	295 cm (116 in)	(Kazakhstan) Rahat

=== Russia ===
The following is the Russian roster in the women's volleyball tournament of the 2008 Summer Olympics.

Head Coach: (Italy) Giovanni Caprara

№	Name	Date of birth	Height	Weight	Spike	Block	2008 club
1	Maria Borodakova	8 March 1986	1.90 m (6 ft 3 in)	80 kg (180 lb)	312 cm (123 in)	308 cm (121 in)	(Russia) Dynamo Moscow
3	Natalia Alimova	9 December 1978	1.89 m (6 ft 2 in)	78 kg (172 lb)	315 cm (124 in)	308 cm (121 in)	(Russia) Leningradka
4	Olga Fateeva	4 May 1985	1.90 m (6 ft 3 in)	72 kg (159 lb)	310 cm (120 in)	303 cm (119 in)	(Russia) Zarechie Odintsovo
5	Lioubov Sokolova	4 December 1977	1.92 m (6 ft 4 in)	72 kg (159 lb)	315 cm (124 in)	307 cm (121 in)	(Russia) Zarechie Odintsovo
6	Yelena Godina	17 September 1977	1.96 m (6 ft 5 in)	72 kg (159 lb)	317 cm (125 in)	310 cm (120 in)	(Russia) Dynamo Moscow
8	Yevgeniya Estes	17 July 1975	1.92 m (6 ft 4 in)	75 kg (165 lb)	315 cm (124 in)	306 cm (120 in)	(Russia) Uralochka
11	Yekaterina Gamova	17 October 1980	2.04 m (6 ft 8 in)	80 kg (180 lb)	321 cm (126 in)	310 cm (120 in)	(Russia) Dynamo Moscow
12	Marina Sheshenina (c)	26 June 1985	1.78 m (5 ft 10 in)	62 kg (137 lb)	302 cm (119 in)	295 cm (116 in)	(Russia) Uralochka
14	Ekaterina Kabeshova (L)	5 August 1986	1.72 m (5 ft 8 in)	62 kg (137 lb)	298 cm (117 in)	290 cm (110 in)	(Russia) Leningradka
15	Aleksandra Pasynkova	14 April 1987	1.90 m (6 ft 3 in)	75 kg (165 lb)	292 cm (115 in)	287 cm (113 in)	(Russia) Uralochka
16	Yulia Merkulova	17 February 1984	2.02 m (6 ft 8 in)	75 kg (165 lb)	317 cm (125 in)	308 cm (121 in)	(Russia) Zarechie Odintsovo
18	Marina Akulova	13 December 1985	1.78 m (5 ft 10 in)	70 kg (150 lb)	303 cm (119 in)	290 cm (110 in)	(Russia) Samorodok Khabarovsk

=== Serbia ===
The following is the Serbian roster in the women's volleyball tournament of the 2008 Summer Olympics.

Head Coach: Zoran Terzić

№	Name	Date of birth	Height	Weight	Spike	Block	2008 club
1	Jelena Nikolić	13 April 1982	1.92 m (6 ft 4 in)	75 kg (165 lb)	315 cm (124 in)	300 cm (120 in)	(Japan) Takefuji Bamboo
2	Jovana Brakočević	5 March 1988	1.96 m (6 ft 5 in)	77 kg (170 lb)	309 cm (122 in)	295 cm (116 in)	(Italy) Spess Volley Conegliano
3	Ivana Đerisilo	8 August 1983	1.85 m (6 ft 1 in)	72 kg (159 lb)	306 cm (120 in)	291 cm (115 in)	(Switzerland) Voléro Zürich
5	Nataša Krsmanović	19 June 1985	1.86 m (6 ft 1 in)	70 kg (150 lb)	294 cm (116 in)	273 cm (107 in)	(Switzerland) Voléro Zürich
7	Brižitka Molnar	28 July 1985	1.82 m (6 ft 0 in)	66 kg (146 lb)	304 cm (120 in)	290 cm (110 in)	(Romania) Metal Galati
9	Jovana Vesović	21 June 1987	1.82 m (6 ft 0 in)	68 kg (150 lb)	283 cm (111 in)	268 cm (106 in)	(Serbia) Jedinstvo Užice
10	Maja Ognjenović	6 August 1984	1.83 m (6 ft 0 in)	68 kg (150 lb)	290 cm (110 in)	270 cm (110 in)	(Romania) Metal Galati
11	Vesna Čitaković (c)	3 February 1979	1.87 m (6 ft 2 in)	75 kg (165 lb)	305 cm (120 in)	300 cm (120 in)	(Turkey) Eczacıbaşı Istanbul
13	Maja Simanić	8 February 1980	1.80 m (5 ft 11 in)	70 kg (150 lb)	280 cm (110 in)	270 cm (110 in)	(Croatia) ZOK Rijeka
15	Sanja Malagurski	8 June 1990	1.92 m (6 ft 4 in)	77 kg (170 lb)	305 cm (120 in)	295 cm (116 in)	(Slovenia) Hit Nova Gorica
17	Stefana Veljković	9 January 1990	1.90 m (6 ft 3 in)	76 kg (168 lb)	320 cm (130 in)	305 cm (120 in)	(Serbia) Poštar 064 Beograd
18	Suzana Ćebić (L)	9 November 1984	1.67 m (5 ft 6 in)	60 kg (130 lb)	279 cm (110 in)	255 cm (100 in)	(Serbia) Jedinstvo Užice

== See also ==
Volleyball at the 2008 Summer Olympics – Men's team rosters
