= 2008 Women's Pan-American Volleyball Cup squads =

This article shows all participating team squads at the 2008 Women's Pan-American Volleyball Cup, held from May 30 to June 7, 2008 in Mexicali and Tijuana, Mexico.

== Argentina ==
- Head coach: Horacio Bastit

#	Name	Date of birth	Height	Weight	Spike	Block
1	Yamila Nizetich	27.01.1989
4	Leticia Boscacci	08.11.1985
7	Tatiana Rizzo	30.12.1986
8	Georgina Klug (c)
9	Natali Flaviani	08.10.1985	183	72	286	280
10	Natalia Espinosa
11	Ileana Leyendeker	14.10.1986
12	Marianela Robinet	24.11.1983	172	54	286	275
13	Sabrina Segui	12.05.1978	180	68	282	271
14	Mirna Ansaldi	10.07.1977	186	80	305	297
17	Georgina Pinedo	30.05.1981	175	65	305	295
18	Yael Castiglione

== Brazil ==
- Head coach: Luizomar De Moura

#	Name	Date of birth	Height	Weight	Spike	Block
2	Suelle Oliveira
3	Barbara Bruch
4	Danielle Lins (c)
5	Adenizia da Silva
8	Regiane Bidias
10	Juliana Valengo de Castro
12	Natalia Pereira
14	Natalia Martins
15	Ana Takagui
16	Michelle Pavao
17	Dayse Figueiredo
18	Camila Brait

== Canada ==
- Head coach: Naoki Miyashita

#	Name	Date of birth	Height	Weight	Spike	Block
1	Dayna Jansen
2	Larissa Cundy
4	Tammy Mahon (c)
5	Tiffany Dodds
9	Emily Cordonier
11	Nadine Alphonse
12	Sherline Tasha Holness
13	Samantha Loewen
14	Ashley Voth
16	Annie Levesque
17	Janie Guimond
18	Tonya Mokelkin

== Costa Rica ==
- Head coach: Braulio Godínez

#	Name	Date of birth	Height	Weight	Spike	Block
1	Dionisia Thompson
2	Karen Cope
4	Viera Chacón
5	Eugenia Guzmán
6	Angela Willis
7	Mariela Quesada
8	Angie Arias
9	Verania Willis (c)
10	Paola Ramírez
14	Irene Fonseca
16	Kimberly Palmer
18	Angélica Jiménez

== Cuba ==
- Head coach: Luis Calderón

#	Name	Date of birth	Height	Weight	Spike	Block
1	Leanny Castañeda
2	Yoana Palacios
3	Leidis Cabrera
4	Yenisey González
5	Dayesi Maso
6	Suramis Acosta
8	Yaima Ortiz
9	Wilma Salas
10	Yusleinis Herrera (c)
11	Lilianny Agüero
16	Ana Cleger
17	Gyselle Silva

== Dominican Republic ==
- Head coach: Beato Miguel Cruz

#	Name	Date of birth	Height	Weight	Spike	Block
1	Annerys Vargas	07.08.1981	194	70	325	315
3	Lisvel Elisa Eve	10.09.1991	189	70	250	287
4	Sidarka Núñez	25.06.1984	188	58	312	308
5	Brenda Castillo	05.06.1992	167	55	220	270
6	Carmen Rosa Caso	29.11.1981	168	59	243	241
8	Niverka Marte	19.10.1990	178	71	233	283
10	Milagros Cabral	17.10.1978	181	63	308	305
12	Karla Echenique	16.05.1986	181	62	279	273
13	Cindy Rondón	12.11.1988	189	61	312	305
14	Prisilla Rivera	29.12.1984	186	70	312	308
15	Cosiri Rodríguez (c)	30.08.1977	191	72	313	305
18	Bethania de la Cruz	13.05.1989	188	58	322	305

== Mexico ==
- Head coach: Luis León

#	Name	Date of birth	Height	Weight	Spike	Block
1	Diana Rubio
2	Migdalel Ruiz
3	Célida Córdova
4	Alicia Castro
5	Zaira Orellana
7	Alejandra Perales
9	Victoria Castilleja
10	Martha Revuelta (c)	06.09.1986	176	77	295	287
11	Carolina Carranza
12	Gema León
15	Lizeth López
17	Carolina Alvarado

== Peru ==
- Head coach: José dos Santos

#	Name	Date of birth	Height	Weight	Spike	Block
1	Sara Joya
2	Mirtha Uribe	12.03.1985	182	67	297	286
3	Verónica Contreras	08.06.1977	174	63	280	282
4	Patricia Soto (c)	10.02.1980	179	67	300	295
5	Vanessa Palacios	03.07.1984	167	66	255	250
6	Jessenia Uceda	14.08.1981	178	69	304	294
7	Yulissa Zamudio	24.03.1976	184	61	320	300
8	Érika Salazar
9	Carla Tristán
12	Carla Rueda	19.04.1990	180	65	284	280
15	Yvon Cancino
16	Kely Culquimboz	06.02.1982	180	63	287	286

== Puerto Rico ==
- Head coach: Juan Carlos Núñez

#	Name	Date of birth	Height	Weight	Spike	Block
1	Deborah Seilhamer	10.04.1985	182	68	280	272
2	Xaimara Colón	11.09.1988	176	62	255	246
3	Vilmarie Mojica (c)	13.08.1985	177	63	295	274
5	Sarai Álvarez	03.04.1986	189	61	295	286
8	Eva Cruz	22.01.1974	182	72	305	290
9	Áurea Cruz	10.01.1982	182	63	310	290
11	Karina Ocasio	08.01.1985	192	76	298	288
12	Ania Ruiz	07.11.1982	182	68	305	284
14	Glorimar Ortega
17	Sheila Ocasio	17.11.1982	192	74	310	292
18	Jetzabel Del Valle	19.12.1979	185	73	305	292

== Trinidad and Tobago ==
- Head coach: Francisco Cruz Jiménez

#	Name	Date of birth	Height	Weight	Spike	Block
1	Cassia Ferreira
4	Marisha Herbert
7	Nadiege Honore
9	Rheeza Grant
10	Courtnee-Mae Clifford	06.07.1990	165	60	280	273
11	Malika Charles
12	Renele Forde
13	Carleen Williams (c)
14	Delana Mitchell
15	Taila de Souza
16	Krystle Esdelle	01.08.1984	187	67	291	282
17	Tondonileshula Hamilton

== United States ==
- Head coach: Thomas Hogan

#	Name	Date of birth	Height	Weight	Spike	Block
3	Cynthia Barboza	07.02.1987	183	73	310	285
4	Alix Klineman
5	Stacy Sykora	24.06.1977	176	61	305	295
7	Tracy Stalls
9	Lauren Paolini
10	Alexis Crimes
12	Heather Hughes
13	Katie Olsovsky
16	Lindsey Hunter
17	Angela McGinnis (c)
18	Kristin Richards
19	Juliann Faucette

== Venezuela ==
- Head coach: Tomás Fernández

#	Name	Date of birth	Height	Weight	Spike	Block
1	Yessica Paz
2	Luz Delfines
5	Génesis Franchesco
6	María Valero
9	Jayce Andrade (c)
10	Desiree Glod
11	Nelmaira Valdez
12	Geraldine Quijada
13	Shirley Florián
14	Aleoscar Blanco
15	María José Pérez
17	Roslandy Acosta
