= Volleyball at the 2005 Bolivarian Games – Women's team rosters =

This article shows all participating women's volleyball squads at the 2005 Bolivarian Games, held from August 13 to 17, 2005 in Pereira, Colombia.

== Colombia ==
- Head Coach:

#	Name	Date of Birth	Height	Weight	Spike	Block
1	Paola Ampudia	05.08.1988	183	60
2	Sandra Montoya	17.05.1982	169	61
4	Carolina Bahamon (c)	08.05.1987	171	57
6	Paula Cortés	31.12.1988	180	70
7	Katerine Trejos	21.10.1985	177	65
8	Mery Mancilla	04.05.1984	185	69
9	Kenny Moreno	06.01.1979	184	60
10	Diana Arango	18.11.1983	167	56
11	Laura Cadavid	21.06.1987	181	62
14	Silvia Lobo	05.12.1985	180	60
15	Jessica Angulo	10.09.1987	185	61
18	Cindy Ramírez	06.05.1989	190	78

== Ecuador ==
- Head Coach:

#	Name	Date of Birth	Height	Weight	Spike	Block
1	Kerly Avecillas	14.07.1984	176	80
2	Diana Bruzzone	18.05.1986	166	61
3	Pamela Castillo	02.02.1987	176	70
4	Victoria Davila	22.06.1983	174	76
5	Stephany Donoso	15.11.1984	150	53
6	Mercedes Gómez	24.09.1987	178	72
9	Malena Izquierdo	06.04.1986	164	66
11	Tania Manangon	18.12.1987	179	64
12	Estefania Mata	28.04.1987	179	70
13	Betsy Melendes	11.02.1987	151	54
14	Carla Ortíz (c)	05.08.1982	160	53
17	Carla Sereni	24.02.1987	176	67

== Peru ==
- Head Coach: Carlos Aparicio

#	Name	Date of Birth	Height	Weight	Spike	Block
1	Natalia Romanova	11.12.1972	185	69
2	Mirtha Uribe	12.03.1985	182	67	297	286
3	Milagros Contreras	08.06.1977	174	63
4	Patricia Soto	10.02.1980	179	67	300	295
5	Vanessa Palacios	03.07.1984	167	66	255	250
6	Evelyn Ampuero	27.12.1987	171	65
8	Milagros Moy	17.10.1975	176	72	296	282
9	Paola García	25.08.1987	182	68
10	Leyla Chihuán (c)	04.09.1975	180	67	297	306
11	Valeria Tipiana	04.05.1984	183	65
12	Kely Culquinboz	06.02.1982	180	63
14	Elena Keldibekova	23.06.1974	177	72	289	280

== Venezuela ==
- Head Coach: Carlos Efrain Aparicios

#	Name	Date of Birth	Height	Weight	Spike	Block
4	Yessica Paz	07.10.1989	192	72	304	300
5	Graciela Márquez (c)	23.03.1978	182	56
6	Suyika Oropeza	23.12.1985	188	82
7	Carmen San Miguel	07.12.1984	185	64
8	Amarilis Villar	30.03.1984	178	70	280	276
9	Jayce Andrade	19.05.1984	179	66	300	296
10	Desiree Glod	28.09.1982	176	64	305	301
11	Irelis Ilarza	08.06.1989	185	69
12	Gheraldine Quijada	31.01.1988	179	65	286	282
13	Verónica Gómez	30.08.1985	184	79
14	Aleoscar Blanco	18.07.1987	189	75	300	296
15	María José Pérez	18.03.1988	188	69	300	296
17	Soriana Pacheco	03.06.1987	176	66
