= 2006 Central American and Caribbean Games women's volleyball squads =

This article shows all participating women's volleyball squads at the 2006 Central American and Caribbean Games, held from July 15 to July 30, 2006, in Cartagena, Colombia.

== Barbados ==
- Head Coach:

#	Name	Date of Birth	Height	Weight	Spike	Block
1	Jannette Brown	10.02.1976	172	72
3	Janelle Chase	22.02.1981	177	59
4	Rhe-Ann Niles	14.06.1986	173	69
5	Shennel Pooler (c)	04.09.1980	170	64
7	Juan Bovell	22.06.1982	179	76
8	Shari Matthews	08.10.1985	169	66
16	Tronya Joseph	18.09.1986	172	70
17	Avara Brown	24.02.1982	176	70
18	Donna Sealy	27.10.1983

== Colombia ==
- Head Coach:

#	Name	Date of Birth	Height	Weight	Spike	Block
1	Etanislasa Cuello Hidalgo	28.01.1984	183	60
2	Sandra Montoya	17.05.1982	169	61
4	Carolina Bahamon	08.05.1987	171	57
5	Tatiana González	01.02.1986	180	64
6	Lina Vanegas	28.09.1986	182	68
8	Mery Mancilla	04.05.1984	185	69
9	Paola Ampudia	05.08.1988	183	60
10	Diana Arango	18.11.1983	167	56
11	Laura Cadavid	21.06.1987	181	62
12	Paula Cortés	31.12.1988	180	70
15	Jessica Ángulo (c)	10.09.1987	185	61
18	Cindy Ramiréz	06.05.1989	190	78

== Costa Rica ==
- Head Coach:

#	Name	Date of Birth	Height	Weight	Spike	Block
1	Dionisia Thompson	09.06.1978
4	Íngrid Morales	29.05.1975
5	Karen Cope	06.11.1985
6	Verania Willis	23.09.1979
7	Adriana Chinchilla	20.03.1980
9	Angela Willis (c)	26.01.1977
10	Paola Ramírez	23.02.1987
11	Onicka Pinock	13.05.1987
14	Johana Moore	10.03.1978
15	Catalina Fernández	12.12.1986
17	Marianela Alfaro	28.03.1985
18	Mariela Quesada	06.07.1987

== Cuba ==
- Head Coach:

#	Name	Date of Birth	Height	Weight	Spike	Block
1	Yumilka Ruiz (c)	08.05.1978	180	63	326	305
2	Yanelis Santos	30.03.1986	183	71	315	312
3	Nancy Carrillo	11.01.1986	190	74	318	315
6	Daimí Ramírez	08.10.1983	176	67	305	290
7	Lisbet Arredondo	22.11.1987	182	67
8	Yaima Ortíz	09.11.1981	181	72
9	Rachel Sánchez	09.01.1989	188	75	325	320
11	Liana Mesa Luaces	26.12.1977	179	70	318	307
12	Rosir Calderón	28.12.1984	191	66	330	325
13	Anniara Muñoz	24.01.1980	181	66
14	Kenia Carcaces	23.01.1986	188	69	308	306
18	Zoila Barros	06.08.1976	188	76	325	312

== Dominican Republic ==
- Head Coach: Beato Miguel Cruz

#	Name	Date of Birth	Height	Weight	Spike	Block
1	Annerys Vargas	07.08.1981	194	70	325	315
5	Evelyn Carrera	05.10.1971	180	70	301	297
6	Carmen Rosa Caso	29.11.1981	168	59	243	241
9	Nuris Arias	20.05.1973	190	78	315	306
10	Milagros Cabral	17.10.1978	181	63	308	305
11	Juana Miguelina González	03.01.1979	185	70	295	290
12	Karla Echenique	16.05.1987	179	62	279	273
13	Cindy Rondón	12.11.1988	189	61	312	305
14	Prisilla Rivera	29.12.1984	186	70	312	308
15	Cosiri Rodríguez (c)	30.08.1977	191	72	313	305
16	Kenia Moreta	07.04.1981	191	76	310	305
18	Bethania de la Cruz	13.05.1989	188	58	322	305

== Mexico ==
- Head Coach:

#	Name	Date of Birth	Height	Weight	Spike	Block
1	Yendy Cortinas	04.07.1982	185	71	296	294
2	Migdalel Ruiz	03.03.1983	180	75	307	298
3	Célida Córdova	01.08.1980	174	68	282	272
6	Mariela García	09.08.1985
7	Bibiana Candelas (c)	02.12.1983	196	78	310	302
8	Ana Mercado	19.02.1983	185	82
11	Blanca Chan	26.07.1981	182	75	298	286
12	Claudia Rodríguez	10.08.1981	191	95	315	305
13	Mariana López	30.08.1985	178	69	295	286
14	Alejandra Acosta	01.07.1986	177	75	290	284
17	Zaira Orellana	03.05.1989	183	63	295	287
18	Gloria Segura	11.02.1982	189	79

== Puerto Rico ==
- Head Coach: Juan Carlos Núñez

#	Name	Date of Birth	Height	Weight	Spike	Block
3	Vilmarie Mojica	13.08.1985	177	63	295	274
4	Tatiana Encarnación	28.07.1985	182	72	300	279
6	Yarleen Santiago	18.01.1978	182	72	305	287
8	Eva Cruz	22.01.1974	182	72	305	290
9	Áurea Cruz (c)	10.01.1982	182	63	310	290
10	Vanessa Vélez	29.08.1986	182	63	292	280
11	Karina Ocasio	08.01.1985	192	76	298	288
13	Dariam Acevedo	15.12.1984	178	68	297	284
14	Glorimar Ortega	21.11.1983	179	70	297	285
15	Shanon Torregrosa	11.02.1981	182	68	307	287
16	Alexandra Oquendo	03.02.1984	189	75	297	284
17	Sheila Ocasio	17.11.1982	192	74	310	292

== Venezuela ==
- Head Coach: Tomás Fernández

#	Name	Date of Birth	Height	Weight	Spike	Block
1	Yessica Paz (c)	07.10.1989	192	72	304	300
2	Yecksimar Gil	07.04.1984	191	72
5	Graciela Márquez	23.03.1978	182	56
6	Suyika Oropeza	23.12.1985	188	82
7	Carmen San Miguel	07.12.1984	185	64
8	Amarilis Villar	30.03.1984	178	70	280	276
10	Desiree Glod	28.09.1982	176	64	305	301
12	Gheraldine Quijada	31.01.1988	179	65	286	282
13	Verónica Gómez	30.08.1985	184	79
14	Aleoscar Blanco	18.07.1987	189	75	300	296
15	María José Pérez	18.03.1988	188	69	300	296
18	Carolin Orozco	27.10.1980	185	80
