= 2008 Women's Junior South American Volleyball Championship =

Tournament details
- Host country: Peru
- Dates: October 1–5
- Teams: 8
- Venues: 2 (in Chosica and Callao host cities)

Final positions
- Champions: Brazil (15th title)

Tournament awards
- MVP: Ivna Marra (BRA)

The 2008 Women's Junior South American Volleyball Championship was the 19th edition of the tournament, organised by South America's governing volleyball body, the Confederación Sudamericana de Voleibol (CSV). It was held in Chosica and Callao, Lima, Peru.

== Competing nations ==
The following national teams qualified, they were seeded according to how they finished in the previous edition of the tournament:

Pool A	Pool B
Brazil (1st); Venezuela (3rd); Colombia (5th); Chile	Peru (Host & 4th); Argentina (2nd); Uruguay (6th); Bolivia

== First round ==
All times are Peruvian Standard Time (UTC-5)

=== Pool A ===
Pos	Team	Pld	W	L	Pts	SW	SL	SR	SPW	SPL	SPR	Qualification
1	Brazil	3	3	0	6	9	0	MAX	225	120	1.875	Semifinals
2	Venezuela	3	2	1	5	6	4	1.500	221	210	1.052	Semifinals
3	Colombia	3	1	2	4	4	7	0.571	214	251	0.853	
4	Chile	3	0	3	3	1	9	0.111	168	247	0.680	

Date	Time		Score		Set 1	Set 2	Set 3	Set 4	Set 5	Total
1 Oct	19:00	Brazil	3–0	Chile	25–17	25–12	25–6			75–35
1 Oct	21:00	Venezuela	3–1	Colombia	25–21	21–25	25–19	25–17		96–82
2 Oct	19:00	Venezuela	3–0	Chile	25–18	25–21	25–14			75–53
2 Oct	21:00	Brazil	3–0	Colombia	25–18	25–6	25–11			75–35
3 Oct	17:00	Brazil	3–0	Venezuela	25–18	25–12	25–20			75–50
3 Oct	19:00	Colombia	3–1	Chile	25–12	22–25	25–20	25–23		97–80

=== Pool B ===
Pos	Team	Pld	W	L	Pts	SW	SL	SR	SPW	SPL	SPR	Qualification
1	Argentina	3	3	0	6	9	0	MAX	225	131	1.718	Semifinals
2	Peru	3	2	1	5	6	3	2.000	207	134	1.545	Semifinals
3	Bolivia	3	1	2	4	3	6	0.500	143	206	0.694	
4	Uruguay	3	0	3	3	0	9	0.000	121	225	0.538	

Date	Time		Score		Set 1	Set 2	Set 3	Set 4	Set 5	Total
1 Oct	17:00	Argentina	3–0	Uruguay	25–19	25–10	25–14			75–43
1 Oct	19:00	Peru	3–0	Bolivia	25–10	25–12	25–15			75–37
2 Oct	17:00	Argentina	3–0	Bolivia	25–10	25–13	25–8			75–31
2 Oct	19:00	Peru	3–0	Uruguay	25–8	25–6	25–8			75–22
3 Oct	19:00	Peru	0–3	Argentina	20–25	16–25	21–25			57–75
3 Oct	21:00	Bolivia	3–0	Uruguay	25–20	25–13	25–23			75–56

== Final round ==
=== Championship ===
Semifinals
2008-10-4 – Callao
Brazil	3
Peru	1
2008-10-4 – Callao
Argentina	1
Venezuela	3

Final
2008-10-5 – Callao
Brazil	3
Venezuela	0
Third place
2008-10-5 – Callao
Peru	3
Argentina	2

=== Semifinals ===
Date	Time		Score		Set 1	Set 2	Set 3	Set 4	Set 5	Total
4 Oct	17:00	Brazil	3–1	Peru	25–16	23–25	25–15	25–20		98–76
4 Oct	19:00	Argentina	1–3	Venezuela	16–25	20–25	25–23	15–25		76–98

=== Seventh place match ===
Date	Time		Score		Set 1	Set 2	Set 3	Set 4	Set 5	Total
5 Oct	14:00	Chile	3–1	Uruguay	25–8	25–16	20–25	25–13		95–62

=== Fifth place match ===
Date	Time		Score		Set 1	Set 2	Set 3	Set 4	Set 5	Total
5 Oct	16:00	Colombia	3–1	Bolivia	25–20	25–14	22–25	25–21		97–80

=== Third place match ===
Date	Time		Score		Set 1	Set 2	Set 3	Set 4	Set 5	Total
5 Oct	18:00	Peru	3–2	Argentina	23–25	20–25	25–23	25–21	15–7	108–101

=== First place match ===
Date	Time		Score		Set 1	Set 2	Set 3	Set 4	Set 5	Total
5 Oct	20:00	Brazil	3–0	Venezuela	25–17	25–15	25–18			75–50

== Final standing ==
Rank	Team
1st place, gold medalist(s)	Brazil
2nd place, silver medalist(s)	Venezuela
3rd place, bronze medalist(s)	Peru
4	Argentina
5	Colombia
6	Bolivia
7	Chile
8	Uruguay

Qualified for the 2009 Junior World Championship

2008 Women's Junior South American Volleyball Championship

Brazil
15th title

== Individual awards ==
- Most valuable player
  - Ivna Marra (BRA)
- Best spiker
  - Isadora Rodrigues (BRA)
- Best blocker
  - Roslandy Acosta (VEN)
- Best server
  - Keith Meneses (PER)
- Best setter
  - Roberta Ratzke (BRA)
- Best digger
  - Maria Roldan (ARG)
- Best receiver
  - Ivna Marra (BRA)
- Best libero
  - María Valero (VEN)
