= 1999 Women's South American Volleyball Championship =

Tournament details
- Host country: Venezuela
- Dates: September 23–26
- Teams: 7
- Venue: 1 (in Valencia host cities)

Final positions
- Champions: Brazil (11th title)

The 1999 Women's South American Volleyball Championship was the 23rd edition of the Women's South American Volleyball Championship, organised by South America's governing volleyball body, the Confederación Sudamericana de Voleibol (CSV). It was held in Valencia, Carabobo, Venezuela

== Teams ==
Teams

Argentina
Brazil
Chile
Paraguay
Peru
Uruguay
Venezuela

== Competition System ==
The competition system for the 1999 Women's South American Championship consisted of three rounds, with Brazil, Peru and Venezuela automatically playing the second round, the other four teams played a single Round-Robin system. Each team played once against each of the 3 remaining teams. Points were accumulated during the first round and the top team advanced to second round. The second round saw another Round-Robin pool, points were again accumulated during the second round and the top two team advanced to play for the gold while the bottom two teams played for bronze.

=== First round ===
==== Standings ====
Pos	Team	Pld	W	L	Pts	SW	SL	SR	SPW	SPL	SPR
1	Argentina	3	3	0	6	9	1	9.000	240	167	1.437
2	Uruguay	3	2	1	5	7	7	1.000	306	291	1.052
3	Paraguay	3	1	2	4	5	6	0.833	218	232	0.940
4	Chile	3	0	3	3	2	9	0.222	180	254	0.709

==== Matches ====
Date		Score		Set 1	Set 2	Set 3	Set 4	Set 5	Total
16 Sep	Argentina	3–0	Chile	25–12	25–13	25–12			25–37
16 Sep	Uruguay	3–2	Paraguay	25–20	27–25	22–25	25–27	15–4	104–101
17 Sep	Argentina	3–0	Paraguay	25–12	25–18	25–12			25–48
17 Sep	Uruguay	3–2	Chile	25–21	21–25	18–25	25–18	15–8	104–100
18 Sep	Argentina	3–1	Uruguay	25–21	15–25	25–20	25–22		90–88
18 Sep	Paraguay	3–0	Chile	25–9	25–18	25–16			75–43

=== Second round ===
==== Standings ====
Pos	Team	Pld	W	L	Pts	SW	SL	SR	SPW	SPL	SPR
1	Brazil	3	3	0	6	9	2	4.500	262	181	1.448
2	Argentina	3	2	1	5	6	4	1.500	214	226	0.947
3	Peru	3	1	2	4	5	7	0.714	259	259	1.000
4	Venezuela	3	0	3	3	2	9	0.222	196	265	0.740

==== Matches ====
Date		Score		Set 1	Set 2	Set 3	Set 4	Set 5	Total
23 Sep	Venezuela	1–3	Argentina	19–25	25–19	22–25	18–25		84–94
23 Sep	Brazil	3–2	Peru	25–14	25–18	24–26	23–25	15–13	112–96
24 Sep	Venezuela	1–3	Peru	14–25	25–21	19–25	13–25		71–96
24 Sep	Brazil	3–0	Argentina	25–13	25–16	25–15			75–44
25 Sep	Peru	0–3	Argentina	24–26	22–25	21–25			67–76
25 Sep	Venezuela	0–3	Brazil	14–25	13–25	14–25			41–75

=== Final round ===
==== Third place ====
Date		Score		Set 1	Set 2	Set 3	Set 4	Set 5	Total
26 Sep	Peru	3–0	Venezuela	25–19	25–20	25–18			75–57

==== First place ====
Date		Score		Set 1	Set 2	Set 3	Set 4	Set 5	Total
26 Sep	Brazil	3–0	Argentina	25–19	25–15	25–20			75–54

== Final standing ==
Rank	Team
1st place, gold medalist(s)	Brazil
2nd place, silver medalist(s)	Argentina
3rd place, bronze medalist(s)	Peru
4	Venezuela
5	Uruguay
6	Paraguay
7	Chile

Qualified for the 1999 World Cup
Qualified as Wild Card for the 1999 World Cup

1999 Women's South American Volleyball Championship

Brazil
11th title
