= 1964 Women's South American Volleyball Championship =

The 1964 Women's South American Volleyball Championship was the 6th edition of the Women's South American Volleyball Championship, organised by South America's governing volleyball body, the Confederación Sudamericana de Voleibol (CSV). It was held in Buenos Aires, Argentina, from 30 March to 8 April.

== Notes ==
Due to a political turmoil in Brazil, the Brazil national team did not participate in this tournament, this is the only edition of the competition so far not featuring the Green and Golds in the final.

== Final standing ==
Rank	Team
1st place, gold medalist(s)	Peru
2nd place, silver medalist(s)	Paraguay
3rd place, bronze medalist(s)	Argentina
4	Uruguay

1964 Women's South American Volleyball Championship

Peru
1st title
