= Amarilis Villar =

Venezuelan volleyball player

Personal information
- Full name: Amarilis Villar Mayorga
- Nickname: Amy
- Nationality: Venezuela
- Born: 30 March 1984 (age 42); Vargas
- Height: 1.78 m (5 ft 10 in)
- Weight: 70 kg (150 lb)
- Spike: 280 cm (110 in)
- Block: 276 cm (109 in)

Volleyball information
- Position: Wing spiker
- Current club: (Venezuela) Vargas
- Number: 8

National team
| 2002–2008 | Venezuela |
Honours
Women's volleyball
Representing Venezuela
South American Championship
| Bronze medal – third place | 2007 Porto Alegre | Team |
Central American and Caribbean Games
| Silver medal – second place | 2002 San Salvador | Team |
- Last updated: June 2010

Amarilis Villar Mayorga (born 30 March 1984 in Vargas) is a volleyball player from Venezuela, who competed for her native country at the 2008 Summer Olympics in Beijing, China. Her team ended up in 8th place.

== Clubs ==
- (Venezuela) Vargas (2001–2010)

== Awards ==
=== National team ===
==== Senior team ====
- 2007 South American Championship - Bronze medal
- 2005 Bolivarian Games - Silver medal
- 2002 Central American and Caribbean Games - Silver medal
- 2001 South American Championship - Bronze medal
- 2001 Bolivarian Games - Silver medal

==== Junior team ====
- South America Junior Continental Championship U-20 - Silver medal
