= 2015 Women's South American Volleyball Championship =

Tournament details
- Host country: Colombia
- Dates: September 29–October 3
- Teams: 8
- Venue: 1

Final positions
- Champions: Brazil (19th title)

Tournament awards
- MVP: Gabriela Guimarães (BRA)

The 2015 Women's South American Volleyball Championship was the 31st edition of the Women's South American Volleyball Championship held in Cartagena, Colombia and organised by South America's governing volleyball body, the Confederación Sudamericana de Voleibol (CSV). Brazil won its 19th title with Gabriela Guimarães being elected Most Valuable Player.

== Competing nations ==
The following national teams participated:

- Argentina
- Brazil
- Chile
- Colombia
- Paraguay
- Peru
- Uruguay
- Venezuela

== Preliminary round ==
=== Pool A ===
Pos	Team	Pld	W	L	Pts	SW	SL	SR	SPW	SPL	SPR	Qualification
1	Peru	3	3	0	8	9	3	3.000	274	197	1.391	Semifinals
2	Colombia	3	2	1	6	7	3	2.333	233	180	1.294	Semifinals
3	Venezuela	3	1	2	4	5	6	0.833	215	222	0.968	5th–8th place classification
4	Paraguay	3	0	3	0	0	9	0.000	102	225	0.453	5th–8th place classification

Date	Time		Score		Set 1	Set 2	Set 3	Set 4	Set 5	Total	Report
29 Sep	15:00	Peru	3–2	Venezuela	19–25	25–17	17–25	25–15	15–6	101–88	Report
29 Sep	19:00	Colombia	3–0	Paraguay	25–8	25–12	25–10			75–30	Report
30 Sep	11:00	Peru	3–0	Paraguay	25–4	25–11	25–11			75–26	Report
30 Sep	19:00	Venezuela	0–3	Colombia	19–25	15–25	18–25			52–75	Report
1 Oct	11:45	Venezuela	3–0	Paraguay	25–9	25–19	25–18			75–46	Report
1 Oct	19:00	Colombia	1–3	Peru	25–22	18–25	24–26	16–25		83–98	Report

=== Pool B ===
Pos	Team	Pld	W	L	Pts	SW	SL	SR	SPW	SPL	SPR	Qualification
1	Brazil	3	3	0	9	9	0	MAX	225	124	1.815	Semifinals
2	Argentina	3	2	1	6	6	3	2.000	197	171	1.152	Semifinals
3	Chile	3	1	2	3	3	7	0.429	185	243	0.761	5th–8th place classification
4	Uruguay	3	0	3	0	1	9	0.111	182	251	0.725	5th–8th place classification

Date	Time		Score		Set 1	Set 2	Set 3	Set 4	Set 5	Total	Report
29 Sep	13:00	Argentina	3–0	Chile	25–17	25–18	25–12			75–47	Report
29 Sep	17:00	Brazil	3–0	Uruguay	25–14	25–11	25–15			75–40	Report
30 Sep	09:00	Chile	0–3	Brazil	16–25	6–25	15–25			37–75	Report
30 Sep	17:00	Argentina	3–0	Uruguay	25–16	25–11	25–22			75–49	Report
1 Oct	09:45	Chile	3–1	Uruguay	25–22	25–22	26–28	25–21		101–93	Report
1 Oct	17:00	Brazil	3–0	Argentina	25–16	25–17	25–14			75–47	Report

== Final round ==
=== 5th–8th classification ===
5th-8th Semifinals
2 October
Paraguay	0
Chile	3
2 October
Venezuela	3
Uruguay	0

5th place match
3 October
Chile	0
Venezuela	3
7th place match
3 October
Paraguay	0
Uruguay	3

==== 5th–8th semifinals ====
Date	Time		Score		Set 1	Set 2	Set 3	Set 4	Set 5	Total	Report
2 Oct	9:00	Paraguay	0–3	Chile	14–25	15–25	10–25			39–75	Report
2 Oct	11:00	Venezuela	3–0	Uruguay	25–23	25–21	25–21			75–65	Report

==== 7th place match ====
Date	Time		Score		Set 1	Set 2	Set 3	Set 4	Set 5	Total	Report
3 Oct	9:00	Paraguay	0–3	Uruguay	13–25	21–25	21–25			55–75	Report

==== 5th place match ====
Date	Time		Score		Set 1	Set 2	Set 3	Set 4	Set 5	Total	Report
3 Oct	11:00	Chile	0–3	Venezuela	23–25	17–25	19–25			59–75	Report

=== Championship ===
Semifinals
2 October
Peru	3
Argentina	2
2 October
Brazil	3
Colombia	0

Final
3 October
Peru	0
Brazil	3
Third place
3 October
Argentina	2
Colombia	3

==== Semifinals ====
Date	Time		Score		Set 1	Set 2	Set 3	Set 4	Set 5	Total	Report
2 Oct	17:00	Peru	3–2	Argentina	25–23	25–27	25–20	25–27	15–13	115–110	Report
2 Oct	19:00	Brazil	3–0	Colombia	25–17	25–12	25–12			75–41	Report

==== Bronze medal match ====
Date	Time		Score		Set 1	Set 2	Set 3	Set 4	Set 5	Total	Report
3 Oct	16:30	Argentina	2–3	Colombia	21–25	24–26	25–19	25–23	6–15	101–108	Report

==== Final ====
Date	Time		Score		Set 1	Set 2	Set 3	Set 4	Set 5	Total	Report
3 Oct	19:00	Peru	0–3	Brazil	17–25	21–25	13–25			51–75	Report

== Final standing ==
Rank	Team
1st place, gold medalist(s)	Brazil
2nd place, silver medalist(s)	Peru
3rd place, bronze medalist(s)	Colombia
4	Argentina
5	Venezuela
6	Chile
7	Uruguay
8	Paraguay

Qualified for the 2017 World Championship

2015 South American Championship

Brazil
19th title

14–woman Roster
Fabiana Claudino (c), Juciely Barreto, Dani Lins, Ana Carolina da Silva, Adenízia da Silva, Gabriela Guimarães, Natália Pereira, Sheilla Castro, Monique Pavão, Fernanda Garay, Roberta Ratzke, Camila Brait, Léia Silva, Mariana Costa
Head coach
José Roberto Guimarães

== Awards ==
- Most valuable player
  (Brazil) Gabriela Guimarães
- Best setter
  (Colombia) María Marín
- Best Outside Hitters
  (Brazil) Gabriela Guimarães
  (Peru) Ángela Leyva
- Best Middle Blockers
  (Brazil) Juciely Barreto
  (Argentina) Natalia Aizpurúa
- Best Opposite
  (Argentina) Carla Castiglione
- Best libero
  (Colombia) Camila Gómez

== See also ==
- South American Men's Volleyball Championship
- Women's U22 South American Volleyball Championship
- Women's Junior South American Volleyball Championship
- Girls' Youth South American Volleyball Championship
- Girls' U16 South American Volleyball Championship
- Volleyball at the Pan American Games
- Women's Pan-American Volleyball Cup
