= 2001 Women's South American Volleyball Championship =

Tournament details
- Host country: Argentina
- Dates: September 13–16
- Teams: 7
- Venue: (in Morón host cities)

Final positions
- Champions: Brazil (12th title)

The 2001 Women's South American Volleyball Championship was the 24th edition of the Women's South American Volleyball Championship, organised by South America's governing volleyball body, the Confederación Sudamericana de Voleibol (CSV). It was held in Morón, Buenos Aires, Argentina

== Teams ==
Due to a conflict between the Peruvian Volleyball Federation and the FIVB, this is the only edition where the red-and-whites have not participated in the South American tournament. So far, the powerful Peruvian women's national volleyball team has won at least a medal in every edition they have participated.

Teams

Argentina
Bolivia
Brazil
Chile
Paraguay
Uruguay
Venezuela

== Competition System ==
The competition system for the 2001 Women's South American Championship consisted of three rounds, with Brazil, Argentina and Venezuela automatically playing the second round, the other four teams played a single Round-Robin system. Each team played once against each of the 3 remaining teams. Points were accumulated during the first round and the top team advanced to second round. The second round saw another Round-Robin pool, points were again accumulated during the second round and the top two team advanced to play for the gold while the bottom two teams played for bronze.

=== First round ===
==== Standings ====
| Pos | Team | Pld | W | L | Pts |
|---|---|---|---|---|---|
| 1 | Uruguay | 4 | 4 | 0 | 8 |
| 2 | Chile | 4 | 3 | 1 | 7 |
| 3 | Paraguay | 4 | 2 | 2 | 6 |
| 4 | Bolivia | 4 | 1 | 3 | 5 |

==== Matches ====
| Date | | Score | | Set 1 | Set 2 | Set 3 | Set 4 | Set 5 | Total |
|---|---|---|---|---|---|---|---|---|---|
| 24 Aug | Uruguay | 3–0 | Paraguay | 25–19 | 25–13 | 25–13 | | | 75–45 |
| 24 Aug | Chile | 3–0 | Bolivia | | | | | | |
| 25 Aug | Uruguay | 3–1 | Bolivia | 25–15 | 25–16 | 18–25 | 26–24 | | 94–80 |
| 25 Aug | Chile | 3–0 | Paraguay | | | | | | |
| 26 Aug | Paraguay | 3–? | Bolivia | | | | | | |
| 27 Aug | Uruguay | 3–? | Chile | | | | | | |

=== Second round ===
==== Standings ====
| Pos | Team | Pld | W | L | Pts | SW | SL | SR | SPW | SPL | SPR |
|---|---|---|---|---|---|---|---|---|---|---|---|
| 1 | Brazil | 3 | 3 | 0 | 6 | 9 | 0 | MAX | 225 | 133 | 1.692 |
| 2 | Argentina | 3 | 2 | 1 | 5 | 6 | 3 | 2.000 | 204 | 183 | 1.115 |
| 3 | Venezuela | 3 | 1 | 2 | 4 | 3 | 6 | 0.500 | 179 | 203 | 0.882 |
| 4 | Uruguay | 3 | 0 | 3 | 3 | 0 | 9 | 0.000 | 136 | 225 | 0.604 |

| Date | | Score | | Set 1 | Set 2 | Set 3 | Set 4 | Set 5 | Total |
|---|---|---|---|---|---|---|---|---|---|
| 13 Sep | Brazil | 3–0 | Venezuela | 25–16 | 25–17 | 25–11 | | | 75–44 |
| 13 Sep | Argentina | 3–0 | Uruguay | 25–16 | 25–11 | 25–21 | | | 75–48 |
| 14 Sep | Venezuela | 3–0 | Uruguay | 25–17 | 25–17 | 25–19 | | | 75–53 |
| 14 Sep | Argentina | 0–3 | Brazil | 20–25 | 14–25 | 20–25 | | | 54–75 |
| 15 Sep | Brazil | 3–0 | Uruguay | 25–14 | 25–12 | 25–9 | | | 75–35 |
| 15 Sep | Argentina | 3–0 | Venezuela | 25–16 | 25–23 | 25–21 | | | 75–60 |

=== Final round ===
==== Third place ====
| Date | | Score | | Set 1 | Set 2 | Set 3 | Set 4 | Set 5 | Total |
|---|---|---|---|---|---|---|---|---|---|
| 16 Sep | Venezuela | 3–0 | Uruguay | 25–21 | 26–24 | 25–23 | | | 76–68 |

==== First place ====
| Date | | Score | | Set 1 | Set 2 | Set 3 | Set 4 | Set 5 | Total |
|---|---|---|---|---|---|---|---|---|---|
| 16 Sep | Brazil | 3–0 | Argentina | 25–18 | 25–22 | 26–24 | | | 76–64 |

== Final standing ==
| Rank | Team |
|---|---|
| 1st place, gold medalist(s) | Brazil |
| 2nd place, silver medalist(s) | Argentina |
| 3rd place, bronze medalist(s) | Venezuela |
| 4 | Uruguay |
| 5 | Chile |
| 6 | Paraguay |
| 7 | Bolivia |

| Qualified for the 2001 World Grand Champions Cup |

2001 Women's South American Volleyball Championship

Brazil
12th title
