= Wendy Romero =

Venezuelan volleyball player (born 1992)

Personal information
- Nationality: Venezuelan
- Born: 8 February 1992 (age 34)
- Height: 1.78 m (5 ft 10 in)
- Weight: 71 kg (157 lb)
- Spike: 295 cm (116 in)
- Block: 291 cm (115 in)

Volleyball information
- Number: 18

Career
- Years: Team
- 2008: (Venezuela) Cojedes

National team
- Years: Team
- 2008: Venezuela

Wendy Romero (born 8 February 1992) is a Venezuelan female volleyball player. She was part of the Venezuela women's national volleyball team.

== Career ==
She competed with the national team at the 2008 Summer Olympics in Beijing, China. She played with Cojedes in 2008.

== Clubs ==
- (Venezuela) Cojedes (2008)

== See also ==
- Venezuela at the 2008 Summer Olympics
