= 2003 Women's South American Volleyball Championship =

Tournament details
- Host country: Colombia
- Dates: September 4–6
- Teams: 4
- Venue: 1 (in Bogotá host cities)

Final positions
- Champions: Brazil (13th title)

The 2003 Women's South American Volleyball Championship was the 25th edition of the South American Women's Volleyball Championship, organised by South America's governing volleyball body, the Confederación Sudamericana de Voleibol (CSV). It was held in Bogotá, Colombia from September 4 to 6, 2003.

== Teams ==
=== Play-off ===
- Venue: Caracas, Venezuela

Team 1	Agg.	Team 2	1st leg	2nd leg
Venezuela	0–2	Peru	2–3	2–3

Date		Score		Set 1	Set 2	Set 3	Set 4	Set 5	Total
30 Aug	Venezuela	2–3	Peru	23–25	25–19	16–25	25–12	11–15	100–96
31 Aug	Peru	3–2	Venezuela	12–25	25–15	18–25	25–16	15–10	95–91

Peru and Venezuela played a qualification play-off, Brazil and Argentina played the final round automatically as best two in the previous edition and Colombia qualified as host.

Teams

Argentina
Brazil
Colombia
Peru

== Competition System ==
The competition system for the 2003 Women's South American Championship was a single Round-Robin system. Each team plays once against each of the 3 remaining teams. Points are accumulated during the whole tournament, and the final ranking is determined by the total points gained.

== Standings ==
Pos	Team	Pld	W	L	Pts	SW	SL	SR	SPW	SPL	SPR
1	Brazil	3	3	0	6	9	0	MAX	226	212	1.066
2	Argentina	3	2	1	5	6	6	1.000	255	274	0.931
3	Peru	3	1	2	4	5	7	0.714	255	261	0.977
4	Colombia	3	0	3	3	2	9	0.222	191	272	0.702

== Matches ==
Date		Score		Set 1	Set 2	Set 3	Set 4	Set 5	Total
4 Sep	Argentina	3–2	Peru	25–27	28–26	21–25	25–20	15–13	114–112
4 Sep	Brazil	3–0	Colombia	25–15	25–11	25–9			75–34
5 Sep	Brazil	3–0	Peru	26–24	25–14	25–6			76–44
5 Sep	Argentina	3–1	Colombia	25–15	25–23	23–25	25–14		98–87
6 Sep	Peru	3–1	Colombia	25–15	24–26	25–16	25–13		99–71
6 Sep	Brazil	3–0	Argentina	25–17	25–13	25–13			75–43

== Final standing ==
Rank	Team
1st place, gold medalist(s)	Brazil
2nd place, silver medalist(s)	Argentina
3rd place, bronze medalist(s)	Peru
4	Colombia

Qualified for the 2003 World Cup

2003 Women's South American champions

Brazil
13th title
