= 2005 Women's South American Volleyball Championship =

Tournament details
- Host country: Bolivia
- Dates: September 17–23
- Teams: 7
- Venue: 1 (in La Paz host cities)

Final positions
- Champions: Brazil (14th title)

Tournament awards
- MVP: Valeska Menezes (BRA)

The 2005 Women's South American Volleyball Championship was the 26th edition of the Women's South American Volleyball Championship, organised by South America's governing volleyball body, the Confederación Sudamericana de Voleibol (CSV). It was held in La Paz, Bolivia from September 17 to 23, 2005.

== Teams ==
Teams

Argentina
Bolivia
Brazil
Chile
Peru
Uruguay
Venezuela

== Competition System ==
The competition system for the 2005 Women's South American Championship was a single Round-Robin system. Each team plays once against each of the 6 remaining teams with one team having a break each date. Points are accumulated during the whole tournament, and the final ranking is determined by the total points gained.

The matches were divided into 2 rounds.

Round 1: Top 3 teams (Brazil, Peru and Argentina according to FIVB Ranking) will play against the 4 remaining teams.

Round 2: Top 3 teams will play against each other, the 4 remaining teams will play against each other too.

== Matches ==
=== Standings ===
Pos	Team	Pld	W	L	Pts	SW	SL	SR	SPW	SPL	SPR
1	Brazil	6	6	0	12	18	0	MAX	450	231	1.948
2	Peru	6	5	1	11	15	3	5.000	424	331	1.281
3	Argentina	6	4	2	10	12	8	1.500	447	439	1.018
4	Venezuela	6	3	3	9	9	11	0.818	415	437	0.950
5	Uruguay	6	2	4	8	9	13	0.692	458	512	0.895
6	Bolivia	6	1	5	7	3	15	0.200	344	427	0.806
7	Chile	6	0	6	6	2	18	0.111	325	491	0.662

=== Round 1 ===
Date		Score		Set 1	Set 2	Set 3	Set 4	Set 5	Total
17 Sep	Argentina	3–1	Uruguay	27–25	25–16	27–29	27-25		106–95
17 Sep	Peru	3–0	Chile	25–19	25–16	25–11			75–46
17 Sep	Bolivia	0–3	Brazil	10–25	12–25	18–25			50–75
18 Sep	Brazil	3–0	Chile	25–7	25–7	25–8			75–22
18 Sep	Bolivia	0–3	Peru	18–25	11–25	19–25			48–75
18 Sep	Argentina	3–0	Venezuela	26–24	25–23	25–18			76–65
19 Sep	Brazil	3–0	Uruguay	25–8	25–8	25–13			75–29
19 Sep	Argentina	3–1	Chile	25–19	25–14	21–25	25–16		96–74
19 Sep	Peru	3–0	Venezuela	25–8	25–20	25–20			75–48
20 Sep	Peru	3–0	Uruguay	26–24	25–20	25–17			76–61
20 Sep	Bolivia	0–3	Argentina	19–25	22–25	14–25			55–75
20 Sep	Brazil	3–0	Venezuela	25–10	25–10	25–11			75–41

=== Round 2 ===
Date		Score		Set 1	Set 2	Set 3	Set 4	Set 5	Total
21 Sep	Chile	1–3	Uruguay	22–25	25–15	20–25	17–25		84–90
21 Sep	Bolivia	0–3	Venezuela	17–25	18–25	21–25			56–75
21 Sep	Brazil	3–0	Argentina	25–15	25–14	25–12			75–41
22 Sep	Venezuela	3–2	Uruguay	26–24	22–25	25–21	23–25	15–11	111–106
22 Sep	Bolivia	3–0	Chile	25–18	25–17	25–15			75–50
22 Sep	Peru	3–0	Argentina	25–20	25–15	25–18			75–53
23 Sep	Venezuela	3–0	Chile	25–19	25–12	25–18			75–49
23 Sep	Uruguay	3–0	Bolivia	25–18	25–17	27–25			77–60
23 Sep	Brazil	3–0	Peru	25–18	25–17	25–13			75–48

== Final standing ==
Rank	Team
1st place, gold medalist(s)	Brazil
2nd place, silver medalist(s)	Peru
3rd place, bronze medalist(s)	Argentina
4	Venezuela
5	Uruguay
6	Bolivia
7	Chile

Qualified for the 2005 World Grand Champions Cup

2005 Women's South American champions

Brazil
14th title

== Individual awards ==
- Most valuable player
  - Valeska Menezes (BRA)
- Best spiker
  - Leyla Chihuan (PER)
- Best blocker
  - Carol Gattaz (BRA)
- Best server
  - Sassá (BRA)
- Best digger
  - Elena Berroterán (VEN)
- Best setter
  - Carolina Albuquerque (BRA)
- Best receiver
  - Milagros Moy (PER)
- Best libero
  - Fabi (BRA)
