= Irina Zaitseva =

Kazakhstani volleyball player (born 1982)

Personal information
- Nationality: Kazakhstani
- Born: 25 September 1982 (age 44); Tashkent, Uzbek SSR, Soviet Union
- Height: 1.85 m (6 ft 1 in)
- Weight: 66 kg (146 lb)
- Spike: 305 cm (120 in)
- Block: 290 cm (110 in)

Volleyball information
- Number: 12

Career
Years	Teams
2008	(Kazakhstan) Rahat

National team
2008	Kazakhstan

Irina Zaitseva (born 25 September 1982) is a Kazakhstani female volleyball player. She was part of the Kazakhstan women's national volleyball team.

She competed with the national team at the 2008 Summer Olympics in Beijing, China. She played with Rahat in 2008.

== Clubs ==
- (Kazakhstan) Rahat (2008)

== See also ==
- Kazakhstan at the 2008 Summer Olympics
