= Verónica Gómez =

Venezuelan volleyball player (1985–2012)

Personal information
- Full name: Verónica Maria Gómez Carabali
- Nationality: Venezuelan
- Born: 30 August 1985
- Died: 13 April 2012 (aged 26)
- Height: 184 cm (72 in)
- Weight: 79 kg (174 lb)

Volleyball information
- Number: 2 (national team)

Career
- Years: Team
- 2011-2012: Lokomotiv Baku

National team
- Years: Team
- 2002-2012: Venezuela

Verónica Maria Gómez Carabali (30 August 1985 - 13 April 2012) was a Venezuelan female volleyball player.

== Career ==
She was part of the Venezuela women's national volleyball team. She won the silver medal at the 2002 Central American and Caribbean Games and the silver medal at the 2005 Bolivarian Games. She was in 2007 awarded in Belgium as volleyball player of the year.

Gómez died at the age of 26 due to heart failure. She recovered in Venezuela from surgery on the Achilles tendon when she died unexpectedly.
