= Alejandra Perales =

Mexican volleyball player (born 1992)

Personal information
- Nationality: Mexican
- Born: 11 August 1992 (age 34)
- Height: 170 cm (67 in)
- Weight: 57 kg (126 lb)
- Spike: 263 cm (104 in)
- Block: 250 cm (98 in)

Volleyball information
- Number: 7 (national team)

Career
Years	Teams
2014	NUEVO LEON

National team
2008-	Mexico

Alejandra Perales (born 11 August 1992) is a Mexican female volleyball player. She is part of the Mexico women's national volleyball team.

She participated in the 2014 FIVB Volleyball World Grand Prix. On club level she played for NUEVO LEON in 2014.
