= 2007 Women's South American Volleyball Championship =

Tournament details
- Host country: Chile
- Dates: September 26–30
- Teams: 8
- Venue: 1 (in Santiago host cities)

Final positions
- Champions: Brazil (15th title)

Tournament awards
- MVP: Paula Pequeno (BRA)

The 2007 Women's South American Volleyball Championship was the 27th edition of the Women's South American Volleyball Championship, organised by South America's governing volleyball body, the Confederación Sudamericana de Voleibol (CSV). It was held in Santiago, Chile from September 26 to 30, 2007.

== Teams ==
Pool A	Pool B
Argentina; Brazil; Colombia; Venezuela	Chile; Paraguay; Peru; Uruguay

== Preliminary round ==
=== Pool A ===
Pos	Team	Pld	W	L	Pts	SW	SL	SR	SPW	SPL	SPR	Qualification
1	Brazil	3	3	0	6	9	0	MAX	225	123	1.829	Semifinals
2	Venezuela	3	2	1	5	6	5	1.200	219	232	0.944	Semifinals
3	Argentina	3	1	2	4	5	7	0.714	245	253	0.968	
4	Colombia	3	0	3	3	1	9	0.111	167	248	0.673	

Date		Score		Set 1	Set 2	Set 3	Set 4	Set 5	Total
26 Sep	Venezuela	3–2	Argentina	23–25	25–22	12–25	25-18	15-11	100–101
26 Sep	Brazil	3–0	Colombia	25–13	25–6	25–14			75–33
27 Sep	Colombia	1–3	Argentina	11–25	18–25	25–22	24-26		78–98
27 Sep	Brazil	3–0	Venezuela	25–10	25–17	25–17			75–44
28 Sep	Venezuela	3–0	Colombia	25–13	25–21	25–22			75–56
28 Sep	Brazil	3–0	Argentina	25–20	25–12	25–14			75–46

=== Pool B ===
Pos	Team	Pld	W	L	Pts	SW	SL	SR	SPW	SPL	SPR	Qualification
1	Peru	3	3	0	6	9	0	MAX	225	143	1.573	Semifinals
2	Uruguay	3	2	1	5	6	4	1.500	224	210	1.067	Semifinals
3	Chile	3	1	2	4	4	6	0.667	201	242	0.831	
4	Paraguay	3	0	3	3	0	9	0.000	146	225	0.649	

Date		Score		Set 1	Set 2	Set 3	Set 4	Set 5	Total
26 Sep	Peru	3–0	Uruguay	25–19	25–19	25–19			75–57
26 Sep	Chile	3–0	Paraguay	25–12	25–21	25–18			75–51
27 Sep	Peru	3–0	Paraguay	25–17	25–15	25–7			75–39
27 Sep	Uruguay	3–1	Chile	25–22	17–25	25–21	25-11		92–79
28 Sep	Uruguay	3–0	Paraguay	25–22	25–20	25–14			75–56
28 Sep	Chile	0–3	Peru	16–25	19–25	12–25			47–75

== Final round ==
=== 5th/8th bracket ===
5th/8th bracket
2007-9-29 - Santiago
Argentina	3
Paraguay	0
2007-9-29 - Santiago
Chile	0
Colombia	3

5th place match
2007-9-29 - Santiago
Argentina	3
Colombia	0
7th place match
2007-9-29 - Santiago
Paraguay	1
Chile	3

=== Championship bracket ===
Semifinals
2007-9-30 - Santiago
Brazil	3
Uruguay	0
2007-9-30 - Santiago
Peru	3
Venezuela	0

Final
2007-9-30 - Santiago
Brazil	3
Peru	0
3rd place
2007-9-30 - Santiago
Uruguay	0
Venezuela	3

=== 5th to 8th classification ===
Date		Score		Set 1	Set 2	Set 3	Set 4	Set 5	Total
29 Sep	Argentina	3–0	Paraguay	25–13	25–16	25–15			75–44
29 Sep	Chile	0–3	Colombia	17–25	28–30	14–25			59–80

=== Semifinals ===
Date		Score		Set 1	Set 2	Set 3	Set 4	Set 5	Total
29 Sep	Peru	3–0	Venezuela	25–20	25–22	25–19			75–61
29 Sep	Brazil	3–0	Uruguay	25–8	25–15	25–12			75–35

=== Seventh place ===
Date		Score		Set 1	Set 2	Set 3	Set 4	Set 5	Total
30 Sep	Paraguay	1–3	Chile	25–13	24–26	23–25	20-25		92–89

=== Fifth place ===
Date		Score		Set 1	Set 2	Set 3	Set 4	Set 5	Total
30 Sep	Argentina	3–0	Colombia	25–15	25–11	25–19			75–45

=== Third place ===
Date		Score		Set 1	Set 2	Set 3	Set 4	Set 5	Total
30 Sep	Venezuela	3–0	Uruguay	25–9	25–19	25–15			75–43

=== First place ===
Date		Score		Set 1	Set 2	Set 3	Set 4	Set 5	Total
30 Sep	Brazil	3–0	Peru	25–20	25–17	25–15			75–52

== Final standing ==
Rank	Team
1st place, gold medalist(s)	Brazil
2nd place, silver medalist(s)	Peru
3rd place, bronze medalist(s)	Venezuela
4	Uruguay
5	Argentina
6	Colombia
7	Chile
8	Paraguay

Qualified for the 2007 World Cup

2007 Women's South American champions

Brazil
15th title

== Individual awards ==
- Most valuable player
  - Paula Pequeno (BRA)
- Best spiker
  - Sheilla Castro (BRA)
- Best blocker
  - Yulissa Zamudio (PER)
- Best server
  - Walewska Oliveira (BRA)
- Best digger
  - Vanessa Palacios (PER)
- Best setter
  - Helia Souza (BRA)
- Best receiver
  - Desiree Glod (VEN)
- Best libero
  - Fabi (BRA)
