= Alicia Castro (volleyball) =

Mexican volleyball player (born 1994)

Personal information
- Nationality: Mexican
- Born: 27 December 1994 (age 31)
- Height: 175 cm (5 ft 9 in)
- Weight: 58 kg (128 lb)
- Spike: 290 cm (114 in)
- Block: 278 cm (109 in)

National team
2008-2010	Mexico

Alicia Castro (born 27 December 1994) is a Mexican female volleyball player. She was part of the Mexico women's national volleyball team.

She participated in the 2010 Women's Pan-American Volleyball Cup.
