= Génesis Franchesco =

Venezuelan volleyball player (born 1990)

Personal information
- Nationality: Venezuelan
- Born: 6 May 1990 (age 36)
- Height: 1.74 m (5 ft 9 in)
- Weight: 61 kg (134 lb)
- Spike: 236 cm (93 in)
- Block: 232 cm (91 in)

Volleyball information
- Current club: Vikingas de Miranda
- Number: 5

National team
- Years: Team
- 2008: Venezuela

Génesis del Carmen Franchesco Machado (born 6 May 1990) is a Venezuelan female volleyball player. She was part of the Venezuela women's national volleyball team.

== Career ==
She competed with the national team at the 2008 Summer Olympics in Beijing, China. She played with Miranda in 2008. She took part of the 2015 Venezuela League championship with Vikingas de Miranda.

== Clubs ==
- (Venezuela) Vikingas de Miranda (2008)
- (Venezuela) Guerreras de Guarico (2013-2014)
- (Venezuela) Vikingas de Miranda (2015)

== Awards ==
=== Club Championships ===
- 2015 Venezuelan League Championship - Champion, with Vikingas de Miranda

== See also ==
- Venezuela at the 2008 Summer Olympics
