= Shirley Florián =

Venezuelan volleyball player (born 1991)

Personal information
- Nationality: Venezuelan
- Born: 27 July 1991 (age 35)
- Height: 1.91 m (6 ft 3 in)
- Weight: 67 kg (148 lb)
- Spike: 305 cm (120 in)
- Block: 301 cm (119 in)

Volleyball information
- Number: 13

Career
Years	Teams
2008	Zulia

National team
2008	Venezuela

Shirley Florián (born 27 July 1991) is a Venezuelan female volleyball player. She was part of the Venezuela women's national volleyball team.

== Career ==
She competed with the national team at the 2008 Summer Olympics in Beijing, China, She played with Zulia in 2008. and at the 2017 FIVB Volleyball World Grand Prix.

== Clubs ==
- Zulia (2008)

== See also ==
- Venezuela at the 2008 Summer Olympics
