= María José Pérez (volleyball) =

Venezuelan volleyball player

Personal information
- Full name: María José Pérez González
- Nationality: Venezuelan
- Born: 18 March 1988 (age 38); Aragua
- Height: 1.88 m (6 ft 2 in)
- Weight: 69 kg (152 lb)
- Spike: 300 cm (120 in)
- Block: 296 cm (117 in)

Volleyball information
- Position: Wing spiker
- Current club: Cignal HD Spikers

National team
2006–	Venezuela
Honours
Women's volleyball
Representing Venezuela
South American Championship
Bronze medal – third place	2007 Porto Alegre	Team
- Last updated: October 2017

María José Pérez González (born 18 March 1988 in Aragua) is a female volleyball player from Venezuela who competed at the 2008 Summer Olympics in Beijing, China. Her team finished in 11th place.

== Career ==
With her national team, she participated at the 2006 Central American and Caribbean Games, finishing in 5th place. A year later, she won the bronze medal at the 2007 South American Championship.

She signed with Llaneras de Toa Baja for the 2008 season of Puerto Rican league, Liga de Voleibol Superior Femenino. Later that year, started playing with the Finnish club Liiga Eura.

She started the 2014 playing the Indonesian Proliga with Manokwari Valeria Papua Barat. Pérez later won the 2014 Venezuelan League championship silver medal with Académicas de Caracas and was awarded best scorer.

She played again in the Indonesian League, this time with Jakarta Electric PLN, winning the Indonesian Proliga championship.

She was chosen best scorer and best spiker for the 2015 season of the Venezuelan league were her club, Académicas de Caracas finished second in the league championship.

Pérez signed in February 2017 with the Indonesian league club Jakarta Elektrik PLN, winning with this club the local championship.

In October 2017, Perez signed with F2 Logistics Cargo Movers to play in the Philippine Superliga. The team won the championship in the tournament and Pérez was awarded the Most Valuable Player.

== Clubs ==
- (Puerto Rico) Llaneras de Toa Baja (2008)
- (Finland) Liiga Eura (2008–2010)
- (Cyprus) AEL Limassol (2010-2011)
- (Finland) Liiga Eura (2011–2012)
- (France) Stella ES Calais (2012-2013)
- (Indonesia) Manokwari Valeria Papua Barat (2014)
- (Venezuela) Académicas de Caracas (2014)
- (Indonesia) Jakarta Electric PLN (2015)
- (Venezuela) Académicas de Caracas (2014)
- (Indonesia) Jakarta Elektrik PLN (2017)
- (Philippines) F2 Logistics Cargo Movers (2017, 2018)
- (Italy) Golden Tulip Volalto Caserta (2018-2019)
- (Philippines) F2 Logistics Cargo Movers (2019)
- (Vietnam) Than Quảng Ninh VC (2022)
- (Philippines) Cignal HD Spikers (2024–present)

== Awards ==
=== Individuals ===
- 2014 Venezuelan League "Best Scorer"
- 2015 Venezuelan League "Best Scorer"
- 2015 Venezuelan League "Best Spiker"
- 2017 Philippine SuperLiga Grand Prix "Most Valuable Player"
- 2024 Premier Volleyball League Reinforced Conference "Best Foreign Guest Player"

=== Clubs ===
- 2014 Venezuelan League – Runner-Up, with Académicas de Caracas
- 2015 Indonesian Proliga – Champion, with Jakarta Elektrik PLN
- 2015 Venezuelan League – Runner-Up, with Académicas de Caracas
- 2017 Indonesian Proliga – Champion, with Jakarta Elektrik PLN
- 2017 Philippine SuperLiga Grand Prix – Champion, with F2 Logistics Cargo Movers
- 2024 Premier Volleyball League Reinforced Conference - Bronze medal, with Cignal HD Spikers

=== National team ===
==== Senior team ====
- 2005 Bolivarian Games - Silver medal
- 2007 South American Championship - Bronze medal
- 2013 Bolivarian Games - Silver medal
