= Yusleinis Herrera =

Cuban volleyball player (born 1984)

Personal information
- Full name: Yusleinis Herrera Álvarez
- Nationality: Cuban
- Born: 12 March 1984 (age 42)
- Height: 5 ft 10 in (1.78 m) (2008)
- Weight: 139 lb (63 kg) (2008)

Volleyball information
- Position: Universal
Honours
Pan-American Cup
Gold medal – first place	2007 Colima	Team
FIVB World Grand Prix
Silver medal – second place	2008 Yokohama	Team

Yusleinis Herrera Álvarez (born 12 March 1984) is a Cuban volleyball player who competed in the 2008 Summer Olympics.

In 2008 she finished fourth with the Cuban team in the Olympic tournament.
