= Roslandy Acosta =

Venezuelan volleyball player (born 1992)

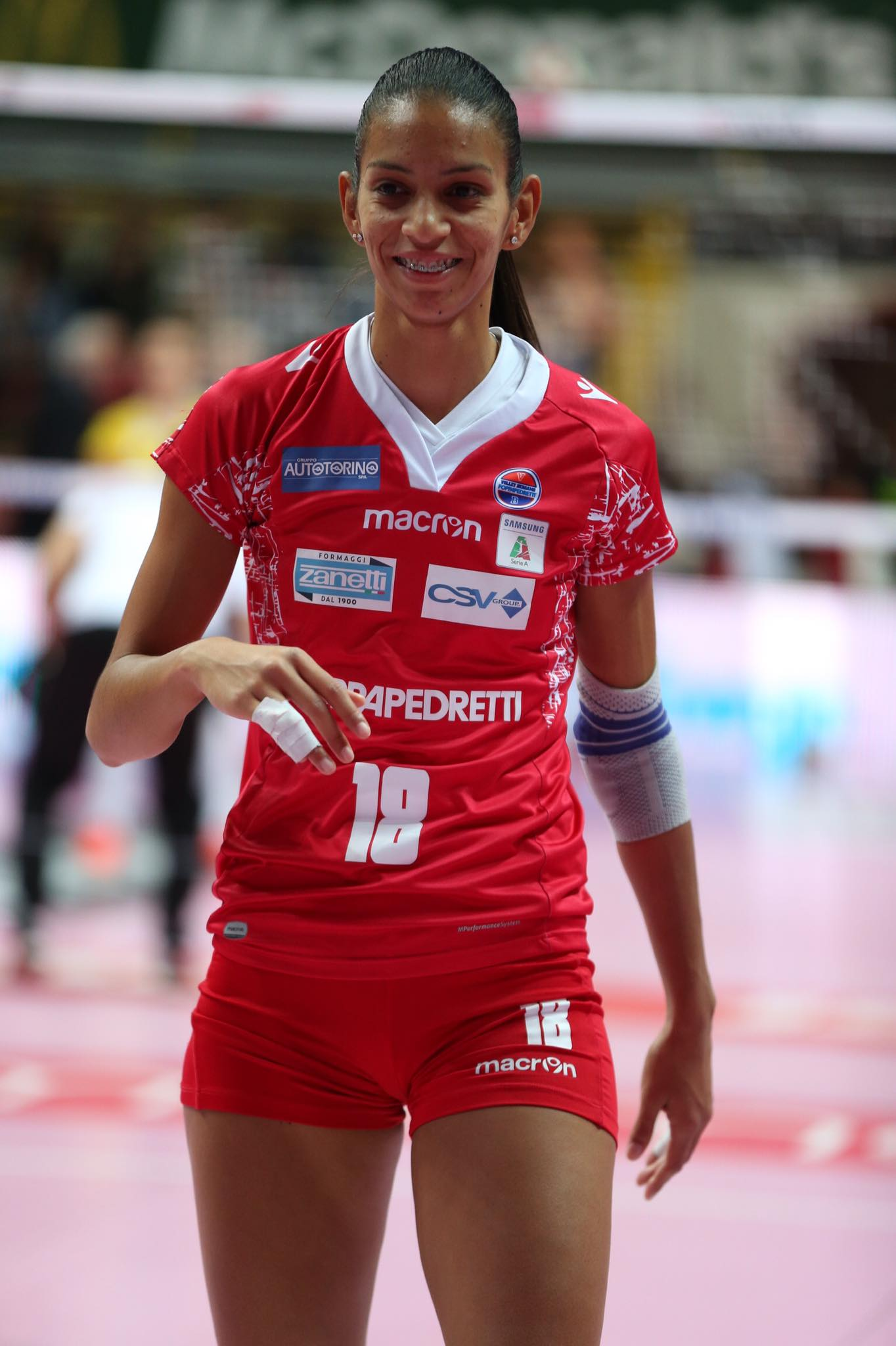

Personal information
- Born: 25 February 1992 (age 34); La Guaira, Venezuela
- Height: 1.90 m (6 ft 3 in)
- Weight: 62 kg (137 lb)
- Spike: 295 cm (116 in)
- Block: 291 cm (115 in)

Volleyball information
- Number: 17

Career
Years	Teams
2008	(Venezuela) Vargas

National team
2008	Venezuela

Roslandy del Valle Acosta Alvarado (born 25 February 1992) is a Venezuelan female volleyball player. She was part of the Venezuela women's national volleyball team. She competed with the national team at the 2008 Summer Olympics.

== Clubs ==
- (Finland) Kangasala (2014)
- (Switzerland) Volley Koniz (2015)
- (Germany) Vilsbiburg (2016)
- (Germany) SC Potsdam (2017)
- (Italy) Volley Bergamo (2018)
- (Brazil) Itambé Minas(2020)
- (Japan) Denso Airybees (2021)

== See also ==
- Venezuela at the 2008 Summer Olympics
