= Gheraldine Quijada =

Venezuelan volleyball player (born 1988)

Personal information
- Nationality: Venezuelan
- Height: 1.79 m (5 ft 10 in)
- Weight: 65 kg (143 lb)
- Spike: 286 cm (113 in)
- Block: 282 cm (111 in)

National team
2008	Venezuela

Gheraldine Quijada was part of the Venezuela women's national volleyball team that competed at the 2008 Summer Olympics in Beijing, China.

== See also ==
- Venezuela at the 2008 Summer Olympics
