= María Valero =

Venezuelan volleyball player (born 1991)

Personal information
- Full name: María Alejandra Valero Balaguer
- Nationality: Venezuelan
- Born: 18 September 1991 (age 35)
- Height: 1.65 m (5 ft 5 in)
- Weight: 60 kg (130 lb)
- Spike: 245 cm (96 in)
- Block: 242 cm (95 in)

Volleyball information
- Number: 6

Career
Years	Teams
2008	(Venezuela) Barinas

National team
2008	Venezuela

María Alejandra Valero Balaguer (born 18 September 1991) is a Venezuelan female former volleyball player. She was part of the Venezuela women's national volleyball team.

== Career ==
She competed with the national team at the 2008 Summer Olympics in Beijing, China, and the 2010 FIVB Volleyball Women's World Championship qualifiers. She played with Barinas in 2008.

== Clubs ==
- (Venezuela) Barinas (2008)

== See also ==
- Venezuela at the 2008 Summer Olympics
