= Jayce Andrade =

Venezuelan volleyball player (born 1984)

Personal information
- Nationality: Venezuelan
- Born: 19 May 1984 (age 42)
- Height: 1.88 m (6 ft 2 in)
- Weight: 72 kg (159 lb)
- Spike: 300 cm (120 in)
- Block: 296 cm (117 in)

Volleyball information
- Number: 9

Career
| Years | Teams |
|---|---|
| 2008 | (Venezuela) Zulia |

National team
| 2008 | Venezuela |

Jayce Josefina Andrade Andrade (born 19 May 1984) is a Venezuelan volleyball player. She was part of the Venezuela women's national volleyball team.

== Career ==
She competed with the national team at the 2008 Summer Olympics in Beijing, China. She played with Zulia in 2008.

== Clubs ==
- (Venezuela) Zulia (2008)

== See also ==
- Venezuela at the 2008 Summer Olympics
