= Desiree Glod =

Venezuelan volleyball player (born 1982)

Personal information
- Full name: Desiree Guillermina Glod John
- Nationality: Venezuela
- Born: 28 September 1982 (age 44); Miranda
- Height: 1.80 m (5 ft 11 in)
- Weight: 64 kg (141 lb)
- Spike: 305 cm (120 in)
- Block: 301 cm (119 in)

Volleyball information
- Position: Wing spiker
- Current club: (Peru) ACD Túpac Amaru
- Number: 10

National team
2002–	Venezuela
Honours
Women's volleyball
Representing Venezuela
South American Championship
Bronze medal – third place	2007 Porto Alegre	Team
Central American and Caribbean Games
Silver medal – second place	2002 San Salvador	Team
- Last updated: November 2015

Desiree Guillermina Glod John (born 28 September 1982 in Miranda) is a volleyball player from Venezuela, who competed for her native country at the 2008 Summer Olympics in Beijing, China. Her team ended up in 8th place.

== Career ==
Playing at the 2005/2006 season at the Spanish Superliga Femenina de Voleibol with the team Maspalomas Costa Canaria, Glod finished the season as the Best Scorer.

The next season she helped Ícaro Alaró to get the promotion to Superliga, winning the Liga FEV Championship.

Glod won with her national team the silver medal at the 2009 Bolivarian Games.

== Clubs ==
- (Spain) Calzada Gijón (2002–2003)
- (Spain) Maspalomas Costa Canaria (2005–2006)
- (Spain) Ícaro Alaró (2006–2007)
- (Spain) Universitat de València (2007–2008)
- (Spain) Palma Volley (2008–2009)
- (Italy) Magliano Trasformatori Chieri (2009–2010)
- (Italy) Banca Reale Yoyogurt Giaveno (2010–2011)
- (Italy) Assitur Corriere Espresso Soverato (2011–2012)
- (Italy) Crovegli Volley (2012–2013)
- (Venezuela) Academicas de Caracas (2013)
- (Turkey) Salihli Belediyesi (2014–2015)
- (Venezuela) Vikingas de Miranda (2015)
- (Peru) ACD Túpac Amaru (2015–2016)

== Awards ==
=== Individual ===
- 2005/2006 Superliga Femenina de Voleibol "Best Scorer"
- 2008 Pan-American Cup "Best Scorer"

=== National team ===
==== Senior team ====
- 2002 Central American and Caribbean Games Silver medal
- 2005 Bolivarian Games – Silver medal
- 2007 South American Championship – Bronze medal
- 2009 Bolivarian Games – Silver medal
- 2013 Bolivarian Games – Silver medal

=== Clubs ===
- 2006–2007 Liga FEV – Champion, with Ícaro Alaró
- 2008–2009 Superliga Femenina de Voleibol – Runner-up, with Palma Volley
