= Aleoscar Blanco =

Venezuelan volleyball player (born 1987)

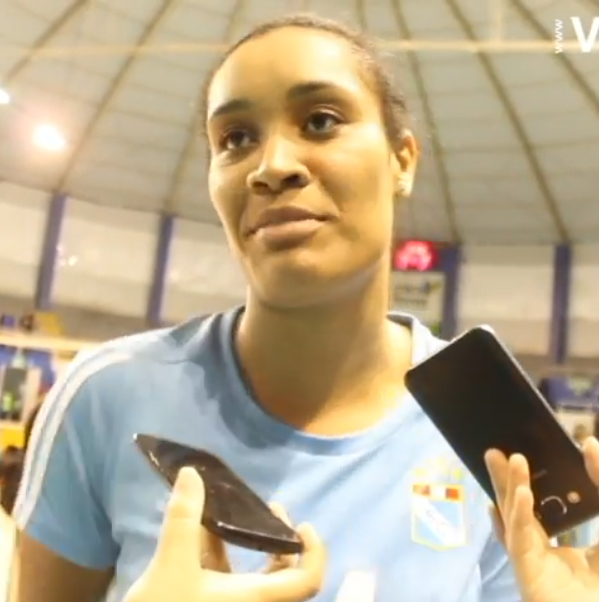
- In a 2015 interview

Personal information
- Nationality: Venezuelan
- Born: 18 July 1987 (age 39)
- Height: 1.89 m (6 ft 2 in)
- Weight: 75 kg (165 lb)
- Spike: 300 cm (118 in)
- Block: 296 cm (117 in)

Volleyball information
- Position: Middle Blocker
- Current club: Creamline Cool Smashers
- Number: 14

National team
| 2008– | Venezuela |

Aleoscar Blanco (born 18 July 1987) is a Venezuelan female volleyball player who participated with the Venezuela national team at the 2008 Summer Olympics in Beijing, China.

== Career ==
She played with Vargas in 2008. Blanco played for the Spanish club Ciudad Las Palmas G.C. Cantur for the 2008/09 season.

== Clubs ==
- (Venezuela) Vargas (2008–2011)
- (Spain) Ciudad Las Palmas G.C. Cantur (2008–2009)
- (Azerbaijan) Igtisadchi Baku (2010–2012)
- (Greece) Olympiacos Piraeus (2012–2013)
- (Slovakia) VTC Pezinok (2013–2014)
- (Peru) Sporting Cristal (2014–2016)
- (Peru) Universidad San Martín (2016–2017)
- (Thailand) Supreme Chonburi (2017–2018)
- (Peru) Regatas Lima (2017–2018)
- (Philippines) Creamline Cool Smashers (2018–2019)
- (France) Rennes EC (2020–2021)
- (Czech Republic) VK UP Olomouc (2021–2022)
- (Chinese Taipei) Top Speed (2022–)

== Awards ==
=== Individual ===
- 2017–18 Thailand League "Best Middle Blocker"

=== Club ===
- 2017–18 Thailand League - Champion, with Supreme Chonburi
- 2018 Thai-Denmark Super League - Champion, with Supreme Chonburi

== See also ==
- Venezuela at the 2008 Summer Olympics
