= Women's South American Volleyball Championship =

Women's volleyball competition in South America

- Upcoming season or competition: 2026 Women's South American Volleyball Championship
- Sport: Volleyball
- Founded: 1951
- No. of teams: 6 (Finals)
- Continent: South America (CSV)
- Most recent champion: Brazil (24th title)
- Most titles: Brazil (24 titles)

The Women's South American Volleyball Championship is the official competition for senior women's national volleyball teams of South America, organized by the Confederación Sudamericana de Voleibol (CSV). The initial gap between championships was variable, but since 1967 they have been awarded every two years. The competition has been dominated by Brazil and Peru.

== History ==
Year	Host	Final			3rd place match			Teams
Year	Host	Champions	Score	Runners-up	3rd place	Score	4th place	Teams
1951; Details	(Brazil); Rio de Janeiro	Brazil	Round-robin	Uruguay	Peru	Round-robin	Argentina	4
1956; Details	(Uruguay); Montevideo	Brazil	Round-robin	Uruguay	Peru	Round-robin	Paraguay	4
1958; Details	(Brazil); Porto Alegre	Brazil	Round-robin	Peru	Uruguay	Round-robin	Paraguay	5
1961; Details	(Peru); Lima	Brazil	Round-robin	Peru	Argentina	Round-robin	Chile	4
1962; Details	(Chile); Santiago	Brazil	Round-robin	Peru	Argentina	Round-robin	Chile	4
1964; Details	(Argentina); Buenos Aires	Peru	Round-robin	Paraguay	Argentina	Round-robin	Uruguay	4
1967; Details	(Brazil); Santos	Peru	Round-robin	Brazil	Paraguay	Round-robin	Uruguay	5
1969; Details	(Venezuela); Caracas	Brazil	Round-robin	Peru	Uruguay	Round-robin	Venezuela	6
1971; Details	(Uruguay); Montevideo	Peru	Round-robin	Brazil	Uruguay	Round-robin	Paraguay	8
1973; Details	(Colombia); Bucaramanga	Peru	Round-robin	Brazil	Uruguay	Round-robin	Chile	7
1975; Details	(Paraguay); Asunción	Peru	Round-robin	Brazil	Argentina	Round-robin	Uruguay	6
1977; Details	(Peru); Arequipa / Lima	Peru	Round-robin	Brazil	Argentina	Round-robin	Chile	8
1979; Details	(Argentina); Rosario / Santa Fe	Peru	Round-robin	Brazil	Argentina	Round-robin	Chile	7
1981; Details	(Brazil); Santo André	Brazil	Round-robin	Peru	Argentina	Round-robin	Paraguay	6
1983; Details	(Brazil); São Paulo	Peru	Round-robin	Brazil	Argentina	Round-robin	Venezuela	5
1985; Details	(Venezuela); Caracas	Peru	Round-robin	Brazil	Venezuela	Round-robin	Colombia	4
1987; Details	(Uruguay); Punta del Este	Peru	Round-robin	Brazil	Venezuela	Round-robin	Argentina	7
1989; Details	(Brazil); Curitiba	Peru	Round-robin	Brazil	Argentina	Round-robin	Venezuela	6
1991; Details	(Brazil); Osasco	Brazil	3–1	Peru	Colombia	Round-robin	Argentina	9
1993; Details	(Peru); Cusco	Peru	3–1	Brazil	Venezuela	Round-robin	Colombia	6
1995; Details	(Brazil); Porto Alegre	Brazil	3–0	Peru	Argentina	Round-robin	Venezuela	8
1997; Details	(Peru); Lima	Brazil	3–0	Peru	Argentina	3–0	Venezuela	6
1999; Details	(Venezuela); Valencia	Brazil	3–0	Argentina	Peru	3–0	Venezuela	7
2001; Details	(Argentina); Morón	Brazil	3–0	Argentina	Venezuela	3–0	Uruguay	4 / 8
2003; Details	(Colombia); Bogotá	Brazil	Round-robin	Argentina	Peru	Round-robin	Colombia	4 / 9
2005; Details	(Bolivia); La Paz	Brazil	Round-robin	Peru	Argentina	Round-robin	Venezuela	7
2007; Details	(Chile); Rancagua / Santiago	Brazil	3–0	Peru	Venezuela	3–0	Uruguay	8
2009; Details	(Brazil); Porto Alegre	Brazil	3–0	Argentina	Peru	3–1	Colombia	8
2011; Details	(Peru); Callao	Brazil	3–0	Argentina	Peru	3–1	Colombia	4 / 7
2013; Details	(Peru); Ica	Brazil	Round-robin	Argentina	Peru	Round-robin	Colombia	6
2015; Details	(Colombia); Cartagena	Brazil	3–0	Peru	Colombia	3–2	Argentina	8
2017; Details	(Colombia); Cali	Brazil	Round-robin	Colombia	Peru	Round-robin	Argentina	6
2019; Details	(Peru); Cajamarca	Brazil	3–0	Colombia	Peru	3–2	Argentina	8
2021; Details	(Colombia); Barrancabermeja	Brazil	Round-robin	Colombia	Argentina	Round-robin	Peru	5
2023; Details	(Brazil); Recife	Brazil	Round-robin	Argentina	Colombia	Round-robin	Chile	5
2026; Details	(Brazil); Rio de Janeiro	Brazil	Round-robin	Argentina	Colombia	Round-robin	Venezuela	6

== Medals summary ==
Rank	Nation	Gold	Silver	Bronze	Total
1	Brazil	24	11	0	35
2	Peru	12	11	9	32
3	Argentina	0	8	13	21
4	Colombia	0	3	4	7
5	Uruguay	0	2	4	6
6	Paraguay	0	1	1	2
7	Venezuela	0	0	5	5
Totals (7 entries)		36	36	36	108

== Most valuable player by edition ==
- 1951 - Unknown
- 1956 - Unknown
- 1958 - Unknown
- 1961 - Unknown
- 1962 - Unknown
- 1964 - Sara Pinedo (PER)
- 1967 - Luisa "Lucha" Fuentes (PER)
- 1969 - Unknown
- 1971 - Unknown
- 1973 - Unknown
- 1975 - Unknown
- 1977 - Unknown
- 1979 - Unknown
- 1981 - Cecilia Tait (PER)
- 1983 - (Peru) Cecilia Tait (2)
- 1985 - Unknown
- 1987 - Denisse Fajardo (PER)
- 1989 - Gabriela Pérez del Solar (PER)
- 1991 - Fernanda Venturini (BRA)
- 1993 - Sonia Ayaucán (PER)
- 1995 - Ana Moser (BRA)
- 1997 - Hélia Souza "Fofão" (BRA)
- 1999 - Unknown
- 2001 - Virna Dias (BRA)
- 2003 - Unknown
- 2005 - Valeska Menezes (BRA)
- 2007 - Paula Pequeno (BRA)
- 2009 - Fabiana de Oliveira (BRA)
- 2011 - Sheilla Castro (BRA)
- 2013 - Madelaynne Montaño (COL)
- 2015 - Gabriela Guimarães (BRA)
- 2017 - Tandara Caixeta (BRA)
- 2019 - Lorenne Teixeira (BRA)
- 2021 - (Brazil) Gabriela Guimarães (2)
- 2023 - (Brazil) Gabriela Guimarães (3)
- 2026 - (Brazil) Gabriela Guimarães (4)

== See also ==
- South American Men's Volleyball Championship
- Women's U22 South American Volleyball Championship
- Women's Junior South American Volleyball Championship
- Girls' Youth South American Volleyball Championship
- Girls' U16 South American Volleyball Championship
- Volleyball at the Pan American Games
- Men's Pan-American Volleyball Cup
- Women's Pan-American Volleyball Cup
