= Yessica Paz =

Venezuelan volleyball player (born 1989)

Personal information
- Nationality: Venezuelan
- Born: 7 October 1989 (age 37)
- Height: 1.92 m (6 ft 4 in)
- Weight: 72 kg (159 lb)
- Spike: 304 cm (120 in)
- Block: 300 cm (120 in)

Volleyball information
- Number: 1

Career
- Years: Team
- 2008: (Venezuela) Aragua

National team
- Years: Team
- 2008: Venezuela

Yessica María Paz Hidalgo (born 7 October 1989) is a Venezuelan female volleyball player. She was part of the Venezuela women's national volleyball team.

== Career ==
She competed with the national team at the 2008 Summer Olympics in Beijing, China. She played with Aragua in 2008.

== Clubs ==
- (Venezuela) Aragua (2008)

== See also ==
- Venezuela at the 2008 Summer Olympics
