= Uruguay women's national volleyball team =

National sports team

Uruguay
- Association: Federación Uruguaya de Voleibol
- Confederation: CSV
- Head coach: Rafael Codina
- FIVB ranking: – (as of 8 January 2025)

Uniforms
| Home | Away |
- uruvoley.com.uy (in Spanish)

Uruguay women's national volleyball team
Medal record

South American Championship
| Silver medal – second place | 1951 | Rio de Janeiro |
| Silver medal – second place | 1956 | Montevideo |
| Bronze medal – third place | 1958 | Porto Alegre |
| Bronze medal – third place | 1969 | Caracas |
| Bronze medal – third place | 1971 | Montevideo |
| Bronze medal – third place | 1973 | Bucaramanga |

The Uruguay women's national volleyball team is the national team of Uruguay. The squad won the silver medal at the inaugural 1951 South American Championship in Rio de Janeiro, Brazil. The dominant forces in women's volleyball on the South American continent however became Brazil and Peru.

== Results ==
=== FIVB tournaments ===
- 1960 FIVB Volleyball Women's World Championship — 9th place
- 1973 FIVB Volleyball Women's World Cup — 10th place

=== Pan-American Cup ===
- 2002 — did not participate
- 2003 — did not participate
- 2004 — did not participate
- 2005 — did not participate
- 2006 — did not participate
- 2007 — 11th place
- 2008 — did not participate
- 2009 — did not participate
- 2010 — did not participate
- 2011 — did not participate
- 2012 — 12th place

=== South American Championship ===
- 2005 — 5th place
- 2007 — 4th place
- 2009 — 5th place
- 2011 — 5th place
- 2013 — did not participate
- 2015 — 7th place
- 2017 — did not participate
- 2019 — 8th place
