= Paraguay women's national volleyball team =

National sports team

Paraguay
- Association: Federación Paraguaya de Voleibol
- Confederation: CSV
- FIVB ranking: NR (24 May 2026)

Uniforms
Home

Paraguay women's national volleyball team
Medal record

South American Championship
| Silver medal – second place | 1964 | Buenos Aires |
| Bronze medal – third place | 1967 | Santos |

The Paraguay women's national volleyball team represents Paraguay in international volleyball competitions. In the 1960s the squad twice won a medal (silver and bronze) at the South American Championship. Paraguay also participated in the 1982 FIVB Women's World Championship in Lima, Peru.

== Results ==
=== FIVB World Championship ===
- 1982 — 19th place

=== Pan American Games ===
- 2031 - Qualified as host

=== South American Championship ===
- 2009 — 8th place
- 2011 — 7th place

== See also ==
- Paraguay men's national volleyball team
