= Venezuela women's national volleyball team =

National sports team

Venezuela
- Association: Federación Venezolana de Voleibol
- Confederation: CSV
- FIVB ranking: 63 ▲23 (2 October 2026)

Uniforms
Home	Away

Summer Olympics
- Appearances: 1 (First in 2008)
- Best result: 11th
- www.fvvb.com.ve (in Spanish)

Venezuela women's national volleyball team
Medal record

South American Championship
Bronze medal – third place	1985	Caracas
Bronze medal – third place	1987	Montevideo
Bronze medal – third place	1993	Cuzco
Bronze medal – third place	2001	Morón
Bronze medal – third place	2007	Santiago

The Venezuela women's national volleyball team is the national team of Venezuela. The dominant forces in women's volleyball on the South American continent are Brazil, Peru and Argentina. The team's highest achievement was during the 2008 South American Olympic Qualification Tournament, defeating Peru in the finals and becoming the only South American team other than Brazil and Peru to compete at the Olympics. But they have yet to qualify for the World Cup.

== Team roster ==
№	Name	Date of birth	Height	Weight	Spike	Block	2017 club
1	Yessica Maria Paz Hidalgo	7 October 1989	1.92 m (6 ft 4 in)	72 kg (159 lb)	304 cm (120 in)	300 cm (120 in)	(Venezuela) Aragua
5	Génesis Franchesco	6 May 1990	1.74 m (5 ft 9 in)	58 kg (128 lb)	236 cm (93 in)	232 cm (91 in)	(Venezuela) Miranda
6	Maria Valero	18 September 1991	1.65 m (5 ft 5 in)	60 kg (130 lb)	245 cm (96 in)	242 cm (95 in)	(Venezuela) Barinas
8	Amarilis Villar	30 March 1984	1.78 m (5 ft 10 in)	70 kg (150 lb)	280 cm (110 in)	276 cm (109 in)	(Venezuela) Vargas
9	Jayce Andrade	19 May 1984	1.88 m (6 ft 2 in)	72 kg (159 lb)	300 cm (120 in)	296 cm (117 in)	(Venezuela) Zulia
10	Desiree Glod	28 September 1982	1.76 m (5 ft 9 in)	64 kg (141 lb)	305 cm (120 in)	301 cm (119 in)	(Venezuela) Miranda
12	Gheraldine Quijada	31 January 1988	1.79 m (5 ft 10 in)	65 kg (143 lb)	286 cm (113 in)	282 cm (111 in)	(Venezuela) D.C.
13	Shirley Florian	27 July 1991	1.91 m (6 ft 3 in)	67 kg (148 lb)	305 cm (120 in)	301 cm (119 in)	(Venezuela) Zulia
14	Aleoscar Blanco	18 July 1987	1.89 m (6 ft 2 in)	75 kg (165 lb)	300 cm (120 in)	296 cm (117 in)	(Thailand) Supreme Chonburi
15	María José Pérez	18 March 1988	1.88 m (6 ft 2 in)	69 kg (152 lb)	300 cm (120 in)	296 cm (117 in)	(Philippines) F2 Logistics Cargo Movers
17	Roslandy Acosta	25 February 1992	1.90 m (6 ft 3 in)	62 kg (137 lb)	295 cm (116 in)	291 cm (115 in)	(Venezuela) Vargas
18	Wendy Romero	8 February 1992	1.78 m (5 ft 10 in)	71 kg (157 lb)	295 cm (116 in)	291 cm (115 in)	(Venezuela) Cojedes

== Results ==
=== Olympic Games ===
- 1964 to 2004 — did not qualify
- 2008 — 11th place
  Yéssica Paz, Génesis Franchesco, Jayce Andradre, María Valero, Amarilis Villar, Desiree Glod, Aleoscar Blanco, Shirley Florian, Gheraldine Quijada, María José Pérez, Roslandy Acosta and Wendy Romero. Head coach: Tomas Fernández
- 2012 to 2024 — did not qualify

=== World Championship ===
- 1952 to 1994 — did not qualify
- 1998 — did not qualify
- 2002 — did not qualify
- 2006 — did not qualify
- 2010 — did not qualify

=== FIVB World Grand Prix ===
- 2017 — 28th

=== Pan American Games ===
- 1955 to 1979 – did not participate
- 1983 — 7th place
- 1987 — did not participate
- 1991 — did not participate
- 1995 — did not participate
- 1999 — did not participate
- 2003 — 5th place
- 2007 — did not participate
- 2011 — did not participate

=== Pan-American Cup ===
- 2002 — did not participate
- 2003 — 5th place
- 2004 — did not participate
- 2005 — 8th place
- 2006 — 8th place
- 2007 — did not participate
- 2008 — 6th place
- 2009 to 2015 — did not participate
- 2016 — 8th place
- 2017 — 10th place

=== Bolivarian Games ===
- 2005 — Silver Medal
- 2009 — Silver Medal

=== South American Championship ===
- 1951 to 1967 — did not participate
- 1969 — 4th place
- 1971 — did not participate
- 1973 — 5th place
- 1975 — did not participate
- 1977 — 7th place
- 1979 — 5th place
- 1981 — did not participate
- 1983 — 4th place
- 1985 — Bronze Medal
- 1987 — Bronze Medal
- 1989 — 4th place
- 1991 — 5th place
- 1993 — Bronze Medal
- 1995 — 4th place
- 1997 — 4th place
- 1999 — 4th place
- 2001 — Bronze Medal
- 2003 — did not participate
- 2005 — 4th place
- 2007 — Bronze Medal
  Yessica Paz, Luz Delfines, Génesis Franchesco, María Valero, Amarilis Villar, Jayce Andrade (c), Desiree Glod, Gheraldine Quijada, Shirley Florian, Aleoscar Blanco, Carmen San Miguel, and María José Pérez. Head coach: Tomás Fernández.
- 2009 — 6th place
- 2011 — did not participate
- 2013 — 5th place
- 2015 — 5th place
- 2017 — 5th place
