= Volleyball at the 2008 Summer Olympics – Women's tournament =

Women's volleyball at the Games of the XXIX Olympiad
- Venue: Capital Indoor Stadium and Beijing Institute of Technology Gymnasium
- Date: 9–23 August
- Competitors: 144 from 12 nations

Medalists
1st place, gold medalist(s)		Brazil (1st title)
2nd place, silver medalist(s)		United States
3rd place, bronze medalist(s)		China

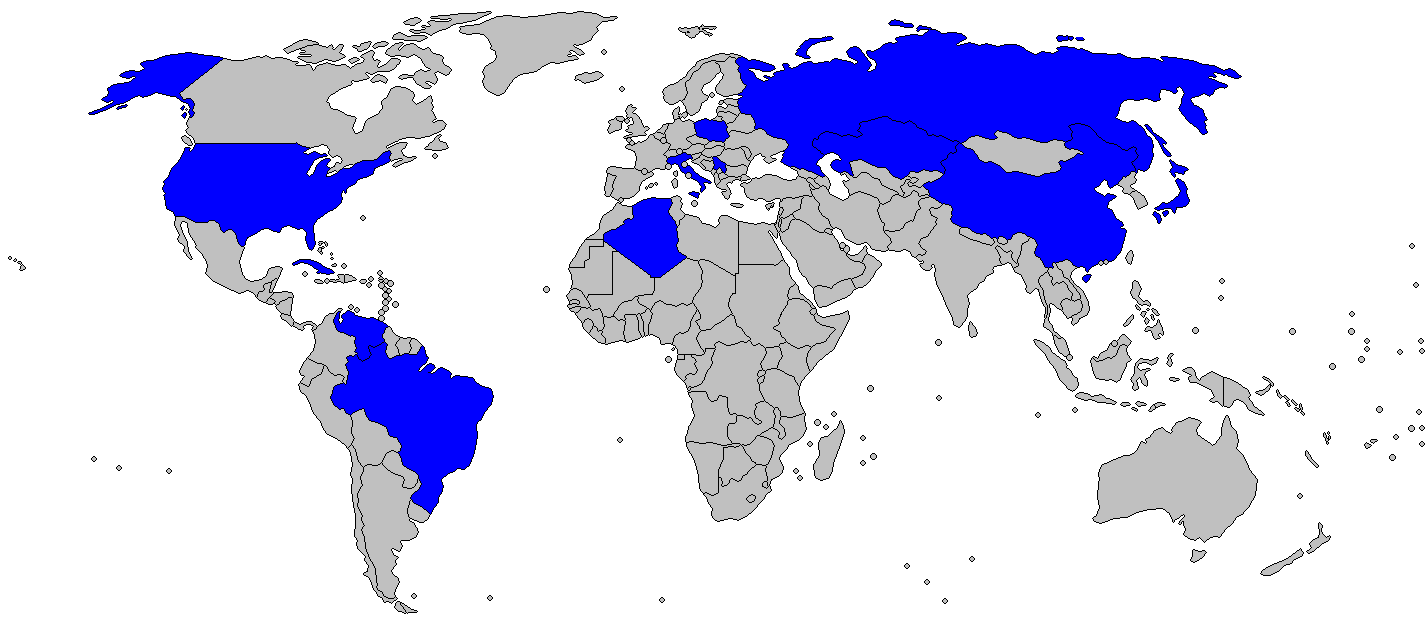
Competing teams

The women's tournament in volleyball at the 2008 Summer Olympics was held at Capital Indoor Stadium and Beijing Institute of Technology Gymnasium from 9 to 23 August 2008.

The twelve competing teams were split equally into two pools of six teams. Each team played all other teams in their pool with the winning team gaining two points and the losing side earning one point. The top four teams from each pool progressed through to the quarterfinals. The rest of the tournament was a single-elimination bracket, with a bronze medal match held between the two semifinal losers.

A total of 38 matches were played: 15 in each group, four quarterfinals, two semifinals, one bronze medal match, and one gold medal match.

Brazil won its first gold by defeating United States in the final.

China won bronze by winning against Cuba.

== Competition schedule ==
P	Preliminary round	¼	Quarterfinals	½	Semifinals	B	Bronze medal match	F	Final

Sat 9	Sun 10	Mon 11	Tue 12	Wed 13	Thu 14	Fri 15	Sat 16	Sun 17	Mon 18	Tue 19	Wed 20	Thu 21	Fri 22	Sat 23	
P		P		P		P		P		¼		½		B	F

== Qualification ==
Means of qualification	Date	Host	Vacancies	Qualified
Host Country	13 July 2001	(Russia) Moscow	1	China
2007 FIVB Women's World Cup	2–16 November 2007	Japan	3	Italy; Brazil; United States
African Olympic Qualification Tournament	22–26 January 2008	(Algeria) Blida	1	Algeria
Asian Olympic Qualification Tournament*	17–25 May 2008	(Japan) Tokyo	1	Kazakhstan
European Olympic Qualification Tournament	15–20 January 2008	(Germany) Halle	1	Russia
North American Olympic Qualification Tournament	17–22 December 2007	(Mexico) Monterrey	1	Cuba
South American Olympic Qualification Tournament	3–7 January 2008	(Peru) Lima	1	Venezuela
World Olympic Qualification Tournament	17–25 May 2008	(Japan) Tokyo	3	Poland; Serbia; Japan
Total			12	

* The Asian Olympic qualification tournament and the World Olympic Qualification Tournament are combined into one event. The top 3 teams at the tournament will qualify as the medallists of the World Olympic Qualification Tournament while the best Asian team outside the top 3 will qualify as the Asian Olympic Qualification Tournament champion.

== Pools composition ==
Teams were seeded following the Serpentine system according to their ranking as of January 2008.

Twelve qualified nations were drawn into two groups, each consisting of six teams. After a robin-round, the four highest-placed teams in each group advanced to a knock-out round to decide the medals.

Group A	Group B
China (Hosts)	Brazil (1)
Cuba (3)	Italy (2)
United States (4)	Russia (5)
Japan (8)	Serbia (7)
Poland (9)	Kazakhstan (16)
Venezuela (29)	Algeria (21)

== Roster ==
Pool A

- China (roster)
- Cuba (roster)
- Japan (roster)
- Poland (roster)
- United States (roster)
- Venezuela (roster)

Pool B

- Algeria (roster)
- Brazil (roster)
- Italy (roster)
- Kazakhstan (roster)
- Russia (roster)
- Serbia (roster)

== Preliminary round ==
All times are China Standard Time (UTC+8).

=== Pool A ===
Pos	Team	Pld	W	L	Pts	SPW	SPL	SPR	SW	SL	SR	Qualification
1	Cuba	5	5	0	10	426	371	1.148	15	3	5.000	Quarterfinals
2	United States	5	4	1	9	459	441	1.041	12	9	1.333	Quarterfinals
3	China	5	3	2	8	467	395	1.182	13	7	1.857	Quarterfinals
4	Japan	5	2	3	7	381	389	0.979	7	11	0.636	Quarterfinals
5	Poland	5	1	4	6	441	445	0.991	9	12	0.750	
6	Venezuela	5	0	5	5	262	395	0.663	1	15	0.067	

9 August 2008; 14:30	Poland	1–3	Cuba	Capital Indoor Stadium; Attendance: 14,000; Referees: Kim Kun-Tae (South Korea), Janpen Jirakakul (Thailand)
9 August 2008; 14:30	(25–21, 17–25, 20–25, 17–25) result statistics			Capital Indoor Stadium; Attendance: 14,000; Referees: Kim Kun-Tae (South Korea), Janpen Jirakakul (Thailand)

9 August 2008; 20:00	Venezuela	0–3	China	Capital Indoor Stadium; Attendance: 12,000; Referees: Dejan Jovanovic (Serbia), Patrick Deregnaucourt (France)
9 August 2008; 20:00	(13–25, 13–25, 18–25) result statistics			Capital Indoor Stadium; Attendance: 12,000; Referees: Dejan Jovanovic (Serbia), Patrick Deregnaucourt (France)

9 August 2008; 22:00	Japan	1–3	United States	Capital Indoor Stadium; Attendance: 11,500; Referees: Massimo Menghini (Italy), Andrei Zenovich (Russia)
9 August 2008; 22:00	(20–25, 25–20, 19–25, 21–25) result statistics			Capital Indoor Stadium; Attendance: 11,500; Referees: Massimo Menghini (Italy), Andrei Zenovich (Russia)

11 August 2008; 12:35	United States	0–3	Cuba	Capital Indoor Stadium; Attendance: 12,000; Referees: Umit Sokullu (Turkey), Dejan Jovanovic (Serbia)
11 August 2008; 12:35	(15–25, 24–26, 17–25) result statistics			Capital Indoor Stadium; Attendance: 12,000; Referees: Umit Sokullu (Turkey), Dejan Jovanovic (Serbia)

11 August 2008; 20:00	China	3–1	Poland	Capital Indoor Stadium; Attendance: 12,000; Referees: Victor Manuel Rodriguez (Puerto Rico), Francisco de Souza (Brazil)
11 August 2008; 20:00	(22–25, 25–15, 25–20, 25–22) result statistics			Capital Indoor Stadium; Attendance: 12,000; Referees: Victor Manuel Rodriguez (Puerto Rico), Francisco de Souza (Brazil)

11 August 2008; 22:15	Japan	3–0	Venezuela	Capital Indoor Stadium; Attendance: 5,000; Referees: Karin Zahorcova (Czech Republic), Frans Loderus (Netherlands)
11 August 2008; 22:15	(25–12, 25–17, 25–12) result statistics			Capital Indoor Stadium; Attendance: 5,000; Referees: Karin Zahorcova (Czech Republic), Frans Loderus (Netherlands)

13 August 2008; 12:00	Venezuela	1–3	United States	Beijing Institute of Technology Gymnasium; Attendance: 3,400; Referees: Andrei Zenovich (Russia), Dejan Jovanovic (Serbia)
13 August 2008; 12:00	(17–25, 25–20, 14–25, 18–25) result statistics			Beijing Institute of Technology Gymnasium; Attendance: 3,400; Referees: Andrei Zenovich (Russia), Dejan Jovanovic (Serbia)

13 August 2008; 20:00	Cuba	3–2	China	Capital Indoor Stadium; Attendance: 13,000; Referees: Frank Leuthauser (Germany), Massimo Menghini (Italy)
13 August 2008; 20:00	(18–25, 14–25, 25–23, 32–30, 15–13) result statistics			Capital Indoor Stadium; Attendance: 13,000; Referees: Frank Leuthauser (Germany), Massimo Menghini (Italy)

13 August 2008; 22:30	Poland	2–3	Japan	Capital Indoor Stadium; Attendance: 5,400; Referees: Humberto Salas (Mexico), Francisco de Souza (Brazil)
13 August 2008; 22:30	(21–25, 20–25, 25–18, 25–23, 11–15) result statistics			Capital Indoor Stadium; Attendance: 5,400; Referees: Humberto Salas (Mexico), Francisco de Souza (Brazil)

15 August 2008; 12:30	Venezuela	0–3	Poland	Capital Indoor Stadium; Attendance: 11,000; Referees: Janpen Jirakakul (Thailand), Humberto Salas (Mexico)
15 August 2008; 12:30	(12–25, 12–25, 20–25) result statistics			Capital Indoor Stadium; Attendance: 11,000; Referees: Janpen Jirakakul (Thailand), Humberto Salas (Mexico)

15 August 2008; 20:00	United States	3–2	China	Capital Indoor Stadium; Attendance: 13,000; Referees: Konstantin Tufekchiev (Bulgaria), Umit Sokullu (Turkey)
15 August 2008; 20:00	(23–25, 25–22, 23–25, 25–20, 15–11) result statistics			Capital Indoor Stadium; Attendance: 13,000; Referees: Konstantin Tufekchiev (Bulgaria), Umit Sokullu (Turkey)

15 August 2008; 22:45	Japan	0–3	Cuba	Capital Indoor Stadium; Attendance: 5,000; Referees: Andrei Zenovich (Russia), Massimo Menghini (Italy)
15 August 2008; 22:45	(17–25, 22–25, 22–25) result statistics			Capital Indoor Stadium; Attendance: 5,000; Referees: Andrei Zenovich (Russia), Massimo Menghini (Italy)

17 August 2008; 12:00	Cuba	3–0	Venezuela	Beijing Institute of Technology Gymnasium; Attendance: 3,500; Referees: Andrei Zenovich (Russia), Konstantin Tufekchiev (Bulgaria)
17 August 2008; 12:00	(25–20, 25–20, 25–19) result statistics			Beijing Institute of Technology Gymnasium; Attendance: 3,500; Referees: Andrei Zenovich (Russia), Konstantin Tufekchiev (Bulgaria)

17 August 2008; 12:30	Poland	2–3	United States	Capital Indoor Stadium; Attendance: 11,000; Referees: Ibrahim al-Naama (Qatar), Francisco de Souza (Brazil)
17 August 2008; 12:30	(25–18, 21–25, 25–19, 19–25, 13–15) result statistics			Capital Indoor Stadium; Attendance: 11,000; Referees: Ibrahim al-Naama (Qatar), Francisco de Souza (Brazil)

17 August 2008; 20:00	China	3–0	Japan	Capital Indoor Stadium; Attendance: 13,000; Referees: Kim Kun-Tae (South Korea), Janpen Jirakakul (Thailand)
17 August 2008; 20:00	(26–24, 25–16, 25–14) result statistics			Capital Indoor Stadium; Attendance: 13,000; Referees: Kim Kun-Tae (South Korea), Janpen Jirakakul (Thailand)

=== Pool B ===
Pos	Team	Pld	W	L	Pts	SPW	SPL	SPR	SW	SL	SR	Qualification
1	Brazil	5	5	0	10	377	226	1.668	15	0	MAX	Quarterfinals
2	Italy	5	4	1	9	372	315	1.181	12	4	3.000	Quarterfinals
3	Russia	5	3	2	8	353	312	1.131	10	6	1.667	Quarterfinals
4	Serbia	5	2	3	7	343	349	0.983	6	10	0.600	Quarterfinals
5	Kazakhstan	5	1	4	6	323	404	0.800	4	13	0.308	
6	Algeria	5	0	5	5	230	392	0.587	1	15	0.067	

9 August 2008; 10:00	Italy	3–1	Russia	Beijing Institute of Technology Gymnasium; Attendance: 3,100; Referees: Frank Leuthauser (Germany), Karin Zahorcova (Czech Republic)
9 August 2008; 10:00	(25–20, 17–25, 25–16, 25–23) result statistics			Beijing Institute of Technology Gymnasium; Attendance: 3,100; Referees: Frank Leuthauser (Germany), Karin Zahorcova (Czech Republic)

9 August 2008; 12:15	Serbia	3–1	Kazakhstan	Beijing Institute of Technology Gymnasium; Attendance: 1,800; Referees: Mitch Davidson (Canada), Victor Manuel Rodriguez (Puerto Rico)
9 August 2008; 12:15	(25–21, 25–17, 23–25, 25–21) result statistics			Beijing Institute of Technology Gymnasium; Attendance: 1,800; Referees: Mitch Davidson (Canada), Victor Manuel Rodriguez (Puerto Rico)

9 August 2008; 12:30	Algeria	0–3	Brazil	Capital Indoor Stadium; Attendance: 12,000; Referees: Liu Jiang (China), Ibrahim al-Naama (Qatar)
9 August 2008; 12:30	(11–25, 11–25, 10–25) result statistics			Capital Indoor Stadium; Attendance: 12,000; Referees: Liu Jiang (China), Ibrahim al-Naama (Qatar)

11 August 2008; 10:00	Algeria	0–3	Serbia	Beijing Institute of Technology Gymnasium; Attendance: 3,100; Referees: Janpen Jirakakul (Thailand), Liu Jiang (China)
11 August 2008; 10:00	(14–25, 13–25, 13–25) result statistics			Beijing Institute of Technology Gymnasium; Attendance: 3,100; Referees: Janpen Jirakakul (Thailand), Liu Jiang (China)

11 August 2008; 12:00	Kazakhstan	0–3	Italy	Beijing Institute of Technology Gymnasium; Attendance: 3,100; Referees: Patricia Salvatore (United States), Humberto Salas (Mexico)
11 August 2008; 12:00	(19–25, 15–25, 21–25) result statistics			Beijing Institute of Technology Gymnasium; Attendance: 3,100; Referees: Patricia Salvatore (United States), Humberto Salas (Mexico)

11 August 2008; 14:30	Brazil	3–0	Russia	Capital Indoor Stadium; Attendance: 12,000; Referees: Osamu Sakaide (Japan), Wang Ning (China)
11 August 2008; 14:30	(25–14, 25–14, 25–16) result statistics			Capital Indoor Stadium; Attendance: 12,000; Referees: Osamu Sakaide (Japan), Wang Ning (China)

13 August 2008; 10:00	Italy	3–0	Algeria	Beijing Institute of Technology Gymnasium; Attendance: 3,400; Referees: Karin Zahorcova (Czech Republic), Janpen Jirakakul (Thailand)
13 August 2008; 10:00	(25–7, 25–20, 25–12) result statistics			Beijing Institute of Technology Gymnasium; Attendance: 3,400; Referees: Karin Zahorcova (Czech Republic), Janpen Jirakakul (Thailand)

13 August 2008; 12:30	Russia	3–0	Kazakhstan	Capital Indoor Stadium; Attendance: 12,000; Referees: Liu Jiang (China), Patricia Salvatore (United States)
13 August 2008; 12:30	(25–19, 25–18, 25–11) result statistics			Capital Indoor Stadium; Attendance: 12,000; Referees: Liu Jiang (China), Patricia Salvatore (United States)

13 August 2008; 14:30	Serbia	0–3	Brazil	Capital Indoor Stadium; Attendance: 11,000; Referees: Kim Kun-Tae (South Korea), Frans Loderus (Netherlands)
13 August 2008; 14:30	(15–25, 13–25, 23–25) result statistics			Capital Indoor Stadium; Attendance: 11,000; Referees: Kim Kun-Tae (South Korea), Frans Loderus (Netherlands)

15 August 2008; 10:00	Algeria	0–3	Russia	Beijing Institute of Technology Gymnasium; Attendance: 3,500; Referees: Patricia Salvatore (United States), Osamu Sakaide (Japan)
15 August 2008; 10:00	(11–25, 19–25, 10–25) result statistics			Beijing Institute of Technology Gymnasium; Attendance: 3,500; Referees: Patricia Salvatore (United States), Osamu Sakaide (Japan)

15 August 2008; 12:00	Brazil	3–0	Kazakhstan	Beijing Institute of Technology Gymnasium; Attendance: 3,500; Referees: Dejan Jovanovic (Serbia), Karin Zahorcova (Czech Republic)
15 August 2008; 12:00	(25–13, 25–6, 27–25) result statistics			Beijing Institute of Technology Gymnasium; Attendance: 3,500; Referees: Dejan Jovanovic (Serbia), Karin Zahorcova (Czech Republic)

15 August 2008; 14:30	Serbia	0–3	Italy	Capital Indoor Stadium; Attendance: 11,000; Referees: Frans Loderus (Netherlands), Frank Leuthauser (Germany)
15 August 2008; 14:30	(23–25, 20–25, 19–25) result statistics			Capital Indoor Stadium; Attendance: 11,000; Referees: Frans Loderus (Netherlands), Frank Leuthauser (Germany)

17 August 2008; 10:00	Kazakhstan	3–1	Algeria	Beijing Institute of Technology Gymnasium; Attendance: 3,500; Referees: Patricia Salvatore (United States), Massimo Menghini (Italy)
17 August 2008; 10:00	(25–18, 25–20, 17–25, 25–16) result statistics			Beijing Institute of Technology Gymnasium; Attendance: 3,500; Referees: Patricia Salvatore (United States), Massimo Menghini (Italy)

17 August 2008; 15:15	Italy	0–3	Brazil	Capital Indoor Stadium; Attendance: 10,500; Referees: Humberto Salas (Mexico), Mitch Davidson (Canada)
17 August 2008; 15:15	(16–25, 22–25, 17–25) result statistics			Capital Indoor Stadium; Attendance: 10,500; Referees: Humberto Salas (Mexico), Mitch Davidson (Canada)

17 August 2008; 22:00	Russia	3–0	Serbia	Capital Indoor Stadium; Attendance: 7,000; Referees: Osamu Sakaide (Japan), Karin Zahorcova (Czech Republic)
17 August 2008; 22:00	(25–21, 25–16, 25–20) result statistics			Capital Indoor Stadium; Attendance: 7,000; Referees: Osamu Sakaide (Japan), Karin Zahorcova (Czech Republic)

== Knockout stage ==
The first four teams in each Preliminary Round pool advanced to the quarterfinals, eight teams in total. The format was as follows:
A1 vs. B4 (first place in pool A vs. fourth place in pool B)
B1 vs. A4
A drawing of lots determined the pairings among A2/A3 and B2/B3. The purpose of this drawing was to prevent a second-place team in a pool from deliberately losing the last game in pool play in order to select an "easier" opponent (in the sense of matchups) in the quarterfinals.

Based on a drawing of lots after the group stage, the United States faced and defeated Italy, while China drew and won against Russia in their quarterfinal matches. The other quarterfinal match-ups were determined by the pool standings. Brazil (pool B winner) played Japan (pool A 4th place). Cuba (pool A winner) played play Serbia (pool B 4th place). Both top seeds went on to defeat their opponents 3–0, thus reaching the semifinals.

In the semifinals, Brazil defeated the host nation and defending champion China, while the United States defeated Cuba. Both semifinal matches were won 3–0.

In the final, Brazil, for the first time in the tournament, lost a set but was able to win the next two sets from the United States to claim the match and the gold medal. In the third-place match, China defeated Cuba for the bronze medal.

=== Bracket ===
Quarter-finals
19 August
Cuba	3
Serbia	0
19 August
United States	3
Italy	2
19 August
China	3
Russia	0
19 August
Japan	0
Brazil	3

Semi-finals
21 August
Cuba	0
United States	3
21 August
China	0
Brazil	3

Gold medal match
23 August
United States	1
Brazil	3
Bronze medal match
23 August
Cuba	1
China	3

All times are China Standard Time (UTC+08:00).

=== Quarterfinals ===
19 August 2008; 10:00	Cuba	3–0	Serbia	Capital Indoor Stadium; Attendance: 12,500; Referees: Ibrahim al-Naama (Qatar), Kim Kun-Tae (South Korea)
19 August 2008; 10:00	(26–24, 25–19, 26–24) result statistics			Capital Indoor Stadium; Attendance: 12,500; Referees: Ibrahim al-Naama (Qatar), Kim Kun-Tae (South Korea)

19 August 2008; 12:00	Japan	0–3	Brazil	Capital Indoor Stadium; Attendance: 12,500; Referees: Konstantin Tufekchiev (Bulgaria), Karin Zahorcova (Czech Republic)
19 August 2008; 12:00	(12–25, 20–25, 16–25) result statistics			Capital Indoor Stadium; Attendance: 12,500; Referees: Konstantin Tufekchiev (Bulgaria), Karin Zahorcova (Czech Republic)

19 August 2008; 20:00	China	3–0	Russia	Capital Indoor Stadium; Attendance: 13,000; Referees: Humberto Salas (Mexico), Victor Manuel Rodriguez (Puerto Rico)
19 August 2008; 20:00	(25–22, 27–25, 25–19) result statistics			Capital Indoor Stadium; Attendance: 13,000; Referees: Humberto Salas (Mexico), Victor Manuel Rodriguez (Puerto Rico)

19 August 2008; 22:00	United States	3–2	Italy	Capital Indoor Stadium; Attendance: 10,000; Referees: Francisco de Souza (Brazil), Osamu Sakaide (Japan)
19 August 2008; 22:00	(20–25, 25–21, 19–25, 25–18, 15–6) result statistics			Capital Indoor Stadium; Attendance: 10,000; Referees: Francisco de Souza (Brazil), Osamu Sakaide (Japan)

=== Semifinals ===
21 August 2008; 12:35	Cuba	0–3	United States	Capital Indoor Stadium; Attendance: 13,000; Referees: Frans Loderus (Netherlands), Dejan Jovanovic (Serbia)
21 August 2008; 12:35	(20–25, 16–25, 17–25) result statistics			Capital Indoor Stadium; Attendance: 13,000; Referees: Frans Loderus (Netherlands), Dejan Jovanovic (Serbia)

21 August 2008; 20:00	China	0–3	Brazil	Capital Indoor Stadium; Attendance: 13,000; Referees: Frank Leuthauser (Germany), Andrei Zenovich (Russia)
21 August 2008; 20:00	(25–27, 22–25, 14–25) result statistics			Capital Indoor Stadium; Attendance: 13,000; Referees: Frank Leuthauser (Germany), Andrei Zenovich (Russia)

=== Bronze medal match ===
23 August 2008; 12:30	Cuba	1–3	China (bronze)	Capital Indoor Stadium; Attendance: 12,500; Referees: Andrei Zenovich (Russia), Konstantin Tufekchiev (Bulgaria)
23 August 2008; 12:30	(16–25, 25–21, 13–25, 20–25) result statistics			Capital Indoor Stadium; Attendance: 12,500; Referees: Andrei Zenovich (Russia), Konstantin Tufekchiev (Bulgaria)

=== Gold medal match ===
23 August 2008; 20:00	(silver) United States	1–3	Brazil (gold)	Capital Indoor Stadium; Attendance: 13.000; Referees: Massimo Menghini (Italy), Umit Sokullu (Turkey)
23 August 2008; 20:00	(15–25, 25–18, 13–25, 21–25) result statistics			Capital Indoor Stadium; Attendance: 13.000; Referees: Massimo Menghini (Italy), Umit Sokullu (Turkey)

=== Award ceremony ===
- 21:50, 23 August 2008

== Statistics leaders ==
- Only players whose teams advanced to the quarterfinals are ranked.

Best Scorers
Rank	Name	Points
1	(United States) Logan Tom	124
2	(Brazil) Sheilla Castro	109
3	(Cuba) Rosir Calderon	106
4	(Cuba) Yumilka Ruiz	103
5	(United States) Tayyiba Haneef-Park	102

Best Spikers
Rank	Name	%Eff
1	(Cuba) Rosir Calderon	42.58
2	(Cuba) Nancy Carrillo	41.13
3	(Cuba) Yumilka Ruiz	40.86
4	(Brazil) Paula Pequeno	39.13
5	(Serbia) Jelena Nikolic	35.00

Best Blockers
Rank	Name	Avg
1	(Japan) Erika Araki	0.86
2	(Russia) Ekaterina Gamova	0.84
2	(Brazil) Fabiana Claudino	0.84
2	(Brazil) Paula Pequeno	0.84
2	(Brazil) Sheilla Castro	0.84

Best Servers
Rank	Name	Avg
1	(Cuba) Yanelis Santos	0.61
2	(Serbia) Jovana Brakocevic	0.53
3	(Cuba) Taismary Aguero	0.48
4	(Brazil) Marianne Steinbrecher	0.40
5	(Japan) Erika Araki	0.38

Best Diggers
Rank	Name	Avg
1	(Italy) Paola Cardullo	3.38
2	(Japan) Yuko Sano	3.29
3	(Brazil) Fabiana de Oliveira	3.24
4	(Serbia) Suzana Cebic	3.21
5	(United States) Nicole Davis	2.88

Best Setters
Rank	Name	Avg
1	(Brazil) Fofão	7.28
2	(Serbia) Maja Ognjenovic	6.58
3	(Japan) Yoshie Takeshita	6.10
4	(Italy) Eleonora Lo Bianco	5.90
5	(United States) Robyn Ah Mow-Santos	3.70

Best Receivers
Rank	Name	%Succ
1	(Italy) Francesca Piccinini	61.00
2	(Serbia) Jelena Nikolic	59.44
3	(Japan) Yuko Sano	77.88
4	(Italy) Antonella Del Core	57.27
5	(Brazil) Marianne Steinbrecher	56.25

== Final standings ==
Place	Team
1st place, gold medalist(s)	Brazil
2nd place, silver medalist(s)	United States
3rd place, bronze medalist(s)	China
4	Cuba
5	Italy
5	Japan
5	Russia
5	Serbia
9	Kazakhstan
9	Poland
11	Algeria
11	Venezuela

2008 Women's Olympic champions

Brazil
1st title

12–woman roster
Oliveira, Albuquerque, Steinbrecher, Pequeno, Menezes, Hélia Souza (c), Menezes, Claudino, Gonzaga, Carvalho, Castro, Fabiana de Oliveira (L)
Head coach
Zé Roberto

== Medalists ==
Gold	Silver	Bronze
Brazil Walewska Oliveira; Carolina Albuquerque; Marianne Steinbrecher; Paula Pequeno; Thaisa Menezes; Hélia Souza (c); Valeska Menezes; Fabiana Claudino; Welissa Gonzaga; Jaqueline Carvalho; Sheilla Castro; Fabiana de Oliveira (L) Head coach: Zé Roberto	United States Ogonna Nnamani; Danielle Scott-Arruda; Tayyiba Haneef-Park; Lindsey Berg; Stacy Sykora (L); Nicole Davis (L); Heather Bown; Jennifer Joines; Kim Glass; Robyn Ah Mow-Santos (c); Kim Willoughby; Logan Tom Head coach: Jenny Lang Ping	China Wang Yimei; Feng Kun (c); Yang Hao; Liu Yanan; Wei Qiuyue; Xu Yunli; Zhou Suhong; Zhao Ruirui; Xue Ming; Li Juan; Zhang Na (L); Ma Yunwen Head coach: Chen Zhonghe

== Individual awards ==
- Most valuable player
  Paula Pequeno (BRA)
- Best scorer
  Logan Tom (USA)
- Best spiker
  Rosir Calderón (CUB)
- Best blocker
  Erika Araki (JPN)
- Best server
  Yanelis Santos (CUB)
- Best setter
  Hélia Souza (BRA)
- Best digger
  Zhang Na (CHN)
- Best receiver
  Zhou Suhong (CHN)
- Best libero
  Fabiana de Oliveira (BRA)
- Fair Play Award:
  Zhao Ruirui (CHN)
- Most popular player:
  Feng Kun (CHN)
