= Peru at the 1976 Summer Olympics =

- IOC code: PER
- NOC: Peruvian Olympic Committee

in Montreal
- Competitors: 13 in 2 sports
- Medals: Gold 0 Silver 0 Bronze 0 Total 0

Summer Olympics appearances (overview)
- 1900; 1904–1932; 1936; 1948; 1952; 1956; 1960; 1964; 1968; 1972; 1976; 1980; 1984; 1988; 1992; 1996; 2000; 2004; 2008; 2012; 2016; 2020; 2024

Peru competed at the 1976 Summer Olympics in Montreal, Canada. An all-female delegation of 13 competitors took part in 3 events in 2 sports.

== Athletics ==
Key

- Note–Ranks given for track events are within the athlete's heat only
- Q = Qualified for the next round
- q = Qualified for the next round as a fastest loser or, in field events, by position without achieving the qualifying target

Women
Track events

Athlete	Event	Heat		Quarterfinal		Semifinal		Final	
Athlete	Event	Time	Rank	Time	Rank	Time	Rank	Time	Rank
Edith Noeding	100 m hurdles	14.14	5	did not advance					

Combined event – Pentathlon

Athlete	Event	100H	SP	HJ	LJ	200 m	Points	Rank
Edith Noeding	Result	14.06	11.41	1.64	—	—	2415	DNF
Edith Noeding	Points	858	682	875	0	0	2415	DNF

== Volleyball ==
=== Volleyball ===
==== Women's team competition ====
- Preliminary round (group A)

- Defeated Canada (3-2)
- Lost to Japan (0-3)
- Lost to Hungary (1-3)

- Classification Matches

- 5th/8th place: Lost to East Germany (2-3)
- 7th/8th place: Defeated Canada (3-1) → Seventh place

- Team roster

- Mercedes Gonzales
- María Cardenas
- Teresa Núñez
- Irma Cordero
- Ana Carrillo
- Luisa Merea
- Delia Cordova
- Silvia Quevedo
- Luisa Fuentes
- María Del-Risco
- María Cervera
- María Ostolaza

- Head coach: Man Bok-Park
