= 2009 Final Four Women's Volleyball Cup squads =

This article shows all participating team squads at the 2009 Final Four Women's Volleyball Cup, held from September 9 to September 13, 2009 in Lima, Peru.

== Brazil ==
- Head Coach: Paulo Barros

#	Name	Date of Birth	Height	Weight	Spike	Block
2	Ana Takagui	26.10.1987	187	74	295	284
3	Danielle Lins	05.01.1985	181	68	290	276
4	Thais Barbosa
5	Caroline Gattaz	27.07.1981	191	87	304	280
8	Adenizia da Silva	18.12.1986	185	63	312	290
9	Juliana Castro
10	Welissa Gonzaga (c)	09.09.1982	179	76	300	287
11	Joyce Silva	13.06.1984	190	67	311	294
12	Natalia Martins
15	Regiane Bidias	02.10.1986	189	74	304	286
16	Fernanda Rodrigues	10.05.1986	179	74	308	288
17	Fabiola de Souza	03.02.1983	184	70	300	285
18	Camila Brait	28.10.1988	170	58	271	256

== Dominican Republic ==
- Head Coach: Marcos Kwiek

#	Name	Date of Birth	Height	Weight	Spike	Block
1	Annerys Vargas	07.08.1981	194	70	325	315
2	Dahiana Burgos	07.04.1985	188	58	312	302
3	Lisvel Elisa Eve	10.09.1991	189	70	250	287
4	Marianne Fersola	16.01.1992	180	60	240	287
5	Brenda Castillo	05.06.1992	167	55	220	270
6	Ana Yorkira Binet	09.02.1992	174	62	267	288
7	Niverka Marte	19.10.1990	178	71	233	283
8	Cándida Arias	11.03.1992	191	68	295	301
10	Milagros Cabral (c)	17.10.1978	181	63	308	305
11	Jeoselyna Rodríguez	09.12.1991	184	63	242	288
12	Karla Echenique	16.05.1986	181	62	279	273
14	Prisilla Rivera	29.12.1984	186	70	312	308
17	Altagracia Mambrú	21.01.1986	180	55	312	302
18	Bethania de la Cruz	13.05.1989	188	58	322	305

== Peru ==
- Head Coach: Cheol Yong Kim

#	Name	Date of Birth	Height	Weight	Spike	Block
1	Angélica Aquino	10.08.1990	170	65	279	268
3	Paola García
4	Patricia Soto	10.02.1980	179	67	300	295
5	Vanessa Palacios	03.07.1984	167	66	255	250
6	Jessenia Uceda	14.08.1981	178	69	304	294
7	Yulissa Zamudio	24.03.1976	184	61	320	300
8	Milagros Moy	17.10.1975	176	72	296	282
10	Leyla Chihuán (c)	04.09.1975	180	67	306	296
12	Carla Rueda	19.04.1990	180	65	284	280
13	Zoila La Rosa	31.05.1990	171	57	285	280
14	Elena Keldibekova	23.06.1974	177	72	289	280
15	Karla Ortiz	20.10.1991	178	60	300	290

== United States ==
- Head Coach: Hugh McCutcheon

#	Name	Date of Birth	Height	Weight	Spike	Block
1	Nicole Fawcett	16.12.1986	191	82	310	291
3	Angela Pressey	06.06.1986	173	74	289	266
4	Lindsey Berg	16.07.1980	173	81	285	270
5	Stacy Sykora	24.06.1977	176	61	305	295
6	Nicole Davis	24.04.1982	167	73	284	266
7	Heather Bown	29.11.1978	188	90	301	290
8	Cynthia Barboza	07.02.1987	183	73	310	285
9	Alexis Crimes	12.06.1986	191	68	325	300
12	Nancy Metcalf (c)	12.11.1978	186	73	314	292
16	Christa Harmotto	12.10.1986	188	79	322	300
17	Mary Spicer	03.07.1987	175	65	292	280
19	Jane Collymore	30.09.1984	182	68	310	305
