= 2010 Final Four Women's Volleyball Cup squads =

This article shows all participating team squads at the 2010 Final Four Women's Volleyball Cup, held from September 21 to September 25, 2010 in Chiapas, Mexico.

== Argentina ==
- Head Coach: Horacio Bastit

#	Name	Date of Birth	Height	Weight	Spike	Block
2	Antonela Bortolozzi	22.01.1986	182	72	298	278
3	Clarisa Sargadia
5	Lucía Fresco	14.05.1991	193	98	308	297
6	Aylin Pereyra	02.07.1988	180	68	300	292
8	Emilce Sosa	11.09.1987	177	65	307	282
9	Natalia Aispurua
12	Josefina Fernández
14	Lucía Gaido
15	María Julia Benet
16	Florencia Busquets	27.06.1989	189	65	309	294
17	Antonela Curatola (c)	23.10.1991	173	72	280	275
18	Tanya Acosta

== Dominican Republic ==
- Head Coach: Marcos Kwiek

#	Name	Date of Birth	Height	Weight	Spike	Block
2	Dahiana Burgos	07.04.1985	188	58	312	302
3	Lisvel Elisa Eve	10.09.1991	189	70	250	287
5	Brenda Castillo	05.06.1992	167	55	220	270
7	Niverka Marte	19.10.1990	178	71	233	283
8	Cándida Arias	11.03.1992	191	68	295	301
9	Sidarka Núñez	25.06.1984	188	58	312	308
11	Jeoselyna Rodríguez	09.12.1991	184	63	242	288
12	Karla Echenique (c)	16.05.1986	181	62	279	273
13	Cindy Rondón	12.11.1988	189	61	312	305
17	Altagracia Mambrú	21.01.1986	180	55	312	302
18	Bethania de la Cruz	13.05.1989	188	58	322	305
19	Ana Yorkira Binet	09.02.1992	174	62	267	288

== Mexico ==
- Head Coach: José A. Bernal

#	Name	Date of Birth	Height	Weight	Spike	Block
2	Valeria Hernández
3	Kaomi Solis
4	María Yessenia Celedón
5	Yazmin Hernández (c)
8	Carolina Alvarado
10	Gabriela Zazueta
12	Seomara Sainz
13	Ruth Durán
15	Grecia Rivera
16	Alejandra Isiordia Carrillo
18	Jocelin Urias Castro
16	Grecia Rivera

== Peru ==
- Head Coach: Cheol Yong Kim

#	Name	Date of Birth	Height	Weight	Spike	Block
1	Angélica Aquino	10.08.1990	171	68	277	260
2	Mirtha Uribe	12.03.1985	182	67	297	286
3	Paola García	25.08.1987	186	78	294	280
4	Patricia Soto	10.02.1980	179	67	300	295
5	Vanessa Palacios	03.07.1984	167	66	255	250
6	Jessenia Uceda	14.08.1981	178	69	304	300
7	Yulissa Zamudio	24.03.1976	184	61	320	300
10	Leyla Chihuán (c)	04.09.1975	180	67	297	306
12	Carla Rueda	19.04.1990	181	65	284	280
13	Zoila La Rosa	31.05.1990	174	60	276	266
14	Elena Keldibekova	23.06.1974	177	72	289	280
15	Karla Ortíz	20.10.1991	178	60	296	290
