= 2011–12 Liga Nacional Superior de Voleibol Femenino =

Liga Nacional Superior de Voleibol Femenino
- Association: FPV
- League: Liga Peruana de Vóley Femenino
- Sport: Volleyball
- Duration: November 16, 2011 to April 13, 2012
- Teams: 12
- Relegated: Deportivo Alianza
- Finals champions: Géminis (3rd title)
- Runners-up: Universidad San Martín

Seasons
- ← 2010–11 2012–13 →

The 2011–12 Liga Nacional Superior de Voleibol Femenino (Spanish for: 2011-12 Women's Senior National Volleyball League) or 2011-12 LNSVF was the 10th official season of the Peruvian Volleyball League. Géminis won the league championship and qualified to the Women's South American Volleyball Club Championship but refused its participation.

During this season, Universidad San Martín made its first appearance in the LNSV after absorbing the Camino de Vida club.

== Teams ==
=== Competing teams ===
Club	Manager
Alianza Lima	(Peru) Carlos Aparicio
Circolo Sportivo Italiano	(Peru) José Antonio Cáceres
Deportivo Alianza	(Peru) Raymundo Valverde
Deportivo Wanka	(Peru) Julio Lung
Divino Maestro	(Peru) Teddy Riera
Géminis	(Peru) Enrique Briceño
Latino Amisa	(Peru) César Arrese
Regatas Lima	(Peru) Antonio Carrasco
Sporting Cristal	(Peru) Walter Lung
Túpac Amaru	(Peru) José Castillo
Universidad César Vallejo	(Cuba) Rolando Díaz
Universidad San Martín	(Peru) David Rodas

== Competition format ==
Because of preparation of some of the players for the London Olympics, this season will not have an "Apertura and Clausura" format, instead it will only have one tournament with two round-robyn rounds. The 2011–12 season started on November 16, 2011, was expected to conclude in April 2012.

== First stage ==
The first round is a Round-Robyn system where all 12 teams will play once against the other 11, due to preparation of some of the players for the London Olympics, and because the league couldn't get 14 first division teams to sign, this round will serve as the Apertura round.

Pool standing procedure

1. Match points
2. Numbers of matches won
3. Sets ratio
4. Points ratio

Match won 3–0 or 3–1: 3 match points for the winner, 0 match points for the loser
Match won 3–2: 2 match points for the winner, 1 match point for the loser

Ranking

Pos	Team	Pld	W	L	Pts	SPW	SPL	SPR	SW	SL	SR
1	Géminis	11	11	0	30	976	791	1.234	33	9	3.667
2	Divino Maestro	11	10	1	29	949	799	1.188	32	9	3.556
3	Alianza Lima	11	8	3	22	996	908	1.097	28	18	1.556
4	Sporting Cristal	11	7	4	19	954	881	1.083	25	17	1.471
5	Universidad San Martín	11	6	5	19	956	880	1.086	24	19	1.263
6	Circolo Sportivo Italiano	11	6	5	18	958	977	0.981	23	22	1.045
7	Túpac Amaru	11	5	6	18	981	942	1.041	23	21	1.095
8	Universidad César Vallejo	11	4	7	14	922	1000	0.922	20	24	0.833
9	Latino Amisa	11	5	6	12	875	899	0.973	18	24	0.750
10	Regatas Lima	11	2	9	9	814	934	0.872	12	29	0.414
11	Deportivo Wanka	11	1	10	4	741	908	0.816	8	30	0.267
12	Deportivo Alianza	11	1	10	3	752	955	0.787	8	32	0.250

=== First round, November 16 – December 20, 2011 ===
The first round consisted of 40 matches, with an average of six matches per week. Teams played seven matches during this round except for four teams that only played six.

Date		Score		Set 1	Set 2	Set 3	Set 4	Set 5	Total	Report
16 Nov	Deportivo Alianza	0–3	Latino Amisa	18–25	27–29	13–25			58–79	
16 Nov	Divino Maestro	3–2	Circolo Sportivo Italiano	21–25	25–18	25–23	22–25	19–17	112–108	
18 Nov	Géminis	3–1	Sporting Cristal	25–22	23–25	25–22	25–21		98–90	
18 Nov	Alianza Lima	3–0	Regatas Lima	25–14	25–20	25–21			75–55	
19 Nov	Universidad San Martín	3–2	Deportivo Wanka	20–25	25–19	25–15	18–25	15–9	103–93	
19 Nov	Universidad César Vallejo	3–1	Túpac Amaru	27–25	27–25	20–25	25–16		99–91	
20 Nov	Universidad César Vallejo	1–3	Alianza Lima	25–21	12–25	20–25	19–25		85–96	
20 Nov	Deportivo Alianza	3–2	Regatas Lima	16–25	25–22	22–25	25–22	15–5	103–99	
23 Nov	Túpac Amaru	3–1	Deportivo Wanka	25–18	25–20	25–27	25–18		100–83	
23 Nov	Géminis	3–0	Latino Amisa	25–21	25–23	25–11			75–55	
25 Nov	Deportivo Alianza	0–3	Universidad San Martín	16–25	17–25	19–25			52–75	
25 Nov	Circolo Sportivo Italiano	0–3	Sporting Cristal	19–25	16–25	21–25			56–75	
26 Nov	Regatas Lima	0–3	Túpac Amaru	17–25	16–25	17–25			50–75	
26 Nov	Alianza Lima	2–3	Latino Amisa	25–22	25–21	20–25	20–25	6–15	96–108	
30 Nov	Sporting Cristal	1–3	Divino Maestro	25–19	18–25	18–25	17–25		78–94	
30 Nov	Alianza Lima	3–0	Deportivo Wanka	25–17	25–15	25–22			75–54	
2 Dec	Universidad César Vallejo	3–0	Deportivo Alianza	25–23	25–14	25–20			75–57	
2 Dec	Géminis	3–0	Regatas Lima	25–21	25–22	25–17			75–60	
3 Dec	Circolo Sportivo Italiano	3–1	Latino Amisa	26–24	14–25	25–19	25–18		90–86	
3 Dec	Universidad San Martín	1–3	Túpac Amaru	22–25	18–25	25–21	23–25		88–96	
4 Dec	Universidad César Vallejo	0–3	Géminis	17–25	5–25	18–25			40–75	
4 Dec	Deportivo Wanka	3–0	Deportivo Alianza	25–22	25–16	25–16			75–54	
7 Dec	Divino Maestro	3–0	Túpac Amaru	25–18	25–14	25–16			75–48	
7 Dec	Sporting Cristal	3–0	Latino Amisa	25–20	25–22	25–14			75–56	
9 Dec	Circolo Sportivo Italiano	3–0	Regatas Lima	25–21	25–16	25–20			75–57	Report
9 Dec	Universidad San Martín	0–3	Alianza Lima	19–25	24–26	15–25			58–76	Report
10 Dec	Latino Amisa	1–3	Divino Maestro	19–25	25–20	20–25	17–25		81–95	
10 Dec	Sporting Cristal	3–0	Regatas Lima	25–17	25–19	25–17			75–53	
11 Dec	Deportivo Wanka	0–3	Géminis	19–25	14–25	17–25			50–75	Report
11 Dec	Divino Maestro	3–2	Universidad San Martín	25–21	15–25	16–25	25–20	15–9	96–100	Report
11 Dec	Alianza Lima	3–2	Túpac Amaru	22–25	25–23	25–19	21–25	15–8	108–100	Report
14 Dec	Circolo Sportivo Italiano	3–1	Deportivo Wanka	25–16	25–20	22–25	25–18		97–79	Report
14 Dec	Divino Maestro	3–0	Alianza Lima	25–14	25–22	25–22			75–58	Report
16 Dec	Túpac Amaru	3–1	Deportivo Alianza	25–22	25–14	24–26	25–17		99–79	
16 Dec	Universidad César Vallejo	2–3	Sporting Cristal	27–25	17–25	25–27	25–23	7–15	101–115	
17 Dec	Latino Amisa	3–2	Regatas Lima	20–25	23–25	25–19	25–13	15–9	108–91	Report
17 Dec	Universidad César Vallejo	2–3	Circolo Sportivo Italiano	25–20	22–25	25–23	17–25	7–15	96–108	Report
17 Dec	Universidad San Martín	2–3	Géminis	25–23	22–25	25–18	12–25	6–15	96–106	
18 Dec	Deportivo Alianza	1–3	Sporting Cristal	18–25	25–22	18–25	6–25		81–97	Report
18 Dec	Divino Maestro	3–0	Deportivo Wanka	25–16	25–23	25–20			75–59	Report

=== Second round, January 6–22, 2012 ===
The second round will see the 26 remaining matches, with an average of seven matches per week.

Date		Score		Set 1	Set 2	Set 3	Set 4	Set 5	Total	Report
6 Jan	Géminis	3–1	Túpac Amaru	26–24	18–25	25–22	25–14		94–85	
6 Jan	Regatas Lima	0–3	Divino Maestro	25–18	25–21	25–12			75–51	Report
7 Jan	Latino Amisa	3–2	Universidad César Vallejo	19–25	25–19	24–26	25–21	15–8	108–99	Report
7 Jan	Alianza Lima	3–2	Deportivo Alianza	24–26	25–12	25–14	20–25	15–5	109–82	Report
8 Jan	Sporting Cristal	3–0	Deportivo Wanka	25–13	25–22	25–14			75–49	Report
8 Jan	Universidad San Martín	3–0	Circolo Sportivo Italiano	25–13	25–22	25–13			75–48	Report
8 Jan	Universidad César Vallejo	3–2	Regatas Lima	25–19	25–22	16–25	14–25	17–15	97–106	Report
11 Jan	Universidad San Martín	3–0	Sporting Cristal	25–21	27–25	25–18			77–64	
11 Jan	Circolo Sportivo Italiano	3–2	Túpac Amaru	22–25	25–21	25–21	17–25	17–15	106–107	
13 Jan	Alianza Lima	2–3	Géminis	17–25	25–18	25–18	15–25	4–15	86–101	
13 Jan	Latino Amisa	3–0	Deportivo Wanka	25–15	25–15	25–20			75–50	
14 Jan	Divino Maestro	3–0	Deportivo Alianza	25–19	25–16	25–10			75–45	
14 Jan	Túpac Amaru	2–3	Sporting Cristal	21–25	25–27	25–19	27–25	8–15	106–111	
14 Jan	Regatas Lima	3–1	Deportivo Wanka	25–19	25–21	22–25	25–20		97–85	
15 Jan	Géminis	3–1	Circolo Sportivo Italiano	19–25	26–24	25–21	25–12		95–82	Report
15 Jan	Universidad César Vallejo	1–3	Universidad San Martín	19–25	31–29	15–25	20–25		85–104	Report
18 Jan	Latino Amisa	1–3	Universidad San Martín	13–25	25–20	15–25	14–25		69–95	
18 Jan	Géminis	3–0	Deportivo Alianza	25–19	25–12	25–22			75–53	Report
20 Jan	Universidad César Vallejo	0–3	Divino Maestro	21–25	24–26	18–25			63–76	
20 Jan	Alianza Lima	3–2	Circolo Sportivo Italiano	25–15	21–25	25–22	21–25	15–4	107–91	Report
21 Jan	Universidad César Vallejo	3–0	Deportivo Wanka	25–12	32–30	25–22			82–64	
21 Jan	Deportivo Alianza	1–3	Circolo Sportivo Italiano	17–25	23–25	25–22	23–25		88–97	
21 Jan	Alianza Lima	3–2	Sporting Cristal	21–25	25–14	24–26	25–21	15–13	110–99	
22 Jan	Latino Amisa	0–3	Túpac Amaru	18–25	14–25	18–25			50–75	
22 Jan	Regatas Lima	3–1	Universidad San Martín	25–21	25–22	20–25	25–23		95–91	
22 Jan	Géminis	3–2	Divino Maestro	22–25	25–15	25–23	21–25	15–13	108–101	

== Second stage ==
The second round of the tournament, also known as the play-offs, will see the 12 teams from the first round compete in another Round-Robyn system, the top 7 teams plus the best team from Round 1 (Géminis) will move on to the knockout stage. It began February 1, 2012 and is expected to conclude March 23, 2012.

Pool standing procedure

1. Match points
2. Numbers of matches won
3. Sets ratio
4. Points ratio

Match won 3–0 or 3–1: 3 match points for the winner, 0 match points for the loser
Match won 3–2: 2 match points for the winner, 1 match point for the loser

Ranking

Pos	Team	Pld	W	L	Pts	SPW	SPL	SPR	SW	SL	SR	Qualification
1	Géminis	22	22	0	61	1934	1584	1.221	66	17	3.882	Quarterfinals
2	Universidad San Martín	22	15	7	47	1903	1659	1.147	55	29	1.897	Quarterfinals
3	Alianza Lima	22	16	6	44	1967	1838	1.070	56	34	1.647	Quarterfinals
4	Divino Maestro	22	15	7	42	1816	1749	1.038	49	34	1.441	Quarterfinals
5	Túpac Amaru	22	13	9	40	1945	1831	1.062	49	37	1.324	Quarterfinals
6	Sporting Cristal	22	12	10	34	1885	1815	1.039	45	40	1.125	Quarterfinals
7	Universidad César Vallejo	22	9	13	30	1925	2031	0.948	42	49	0.857	Quarterfinals
8	Latino Amisa	22	10	12	28	1848	1853	0.997	40	46	0.870	Quarterfinals
9	Circolo Sportivo Italiano	22	9	13	27	1913	1972	0.970	40	50	0.800	
10	Regatas Lima	22	4	18	16	1631	1842	0.885	23	57	0.404	
11	Deportivo Wanka	22	4	18	14	1590	1880	0.846	23	58	0.397	
12	Deportivo Alianza	22	4	18	13	1577	1880	0.839	21	58	0.362	Cuadrangular por la permanencia

=== Results ===
Date		Score		Set 1	Set 2	Set 3	Set 4	Set 5	Total	Report
1 Feb	Divino Maestro	3–0	Deportivo Wanka	25–15	25–22	25–16			75–53	
1 Feb	Géminis	3–0	Deportivo Alianza	25–15	25–20	25–19			75–54	
3 Feb	Latino Amisa	2–3	Sporting Cristal	22–25	31–29	25–21	23–25	12–15	113–105	
3 Feb	Regatas Lima	0–3	Alianza Lima	22–25	15–25	22–25			59–75	
4 Feb	Circolo Sportivo Italiano	1–3	Túpac Amaru	23–25	26–24	26–28	14–25		89–102	
4 Feb	Géminis	3–0	Deportivo Wanka	25–12	25–22	25–16			75–50	
4 Feb	Universidad San Martín	3–1	Universidad César Vallejo	25–15	20–25	26–24	25–21		96–75	
5 Feb	Universidad César Vallejo	0–3	Alianza Lima	19–25	23–25	25–27			67–77	Report
5 Feb	Universidad San Martín	3–0	Circolo Sportivo Italiano	20–25	25–18	25–22	25–14		95–79	Report
5 Feb	Sporting Cristal	0–3	Túpac Amaru	18–25	20–25	28–30			66–80	Report
8 Feb	Divino Maestro	0–3	Latino Amisa	15–25	22–25	23–25			60–75	
8 Feb	Deportivo Alianza	1–3	Regatas Lima	25–20	25–15	23–25	25–22		98–82	
10 Feb	Divino Maestro	2–3	Túpac Amaru	24–26	25–21	20–25	25–23	13–15	107–110	Report
10 Feb	Géminis	3–0	Regatas Lima	25–17	25–17	27–25			77–59	Report
11 Feb	Latino Amisa	2–3	Deportivo Wanka	25–20	25–16	16–25	16–25	15–12	17–98	Report
11 Feb	Circolo Sportivo Italiano	1–3	Deportivo Alianza	33–35	23–25	25–15	21–25		102–100	Report
11 Feb	Universidad San Martín	3–0	Sporting Cristal	25–20	25–18	25–19			75–57	Report
12 Feb	Túpac Amaru	3–1	Deportivo Wanka	22–25	25–18	25–19	25-21		97–83	
12 Feb	Alianza Lima	3–2	Circolo Sportivo Italiano	20–25	25–19	19–25	25-23	15-11	103–104	
12 Feb	Géminis	3–1	Latino Amisa	25–23	19–25	25–20	25–20		94–88	
15 Feb	Alianza Lima	1–3	Sporting Cristal	19–25	14–25	25–17	21–25		79–92	Report
15 Feb	Divino Maestro	0–3	Universidad San Martín	15–25	19–25	13–25			47–75	Report
17 Feb	Divino Maestro	2–3	Alianza Lima	25–20	18–25	25–22	20–25	13–15	101–107	
17 Feb	Universidad César Vallejo	3–2	Circolo Sportivo Italiano	25–19	25–23	18–25	19–25	15–13	102–105	
18 Feb	Universidad San Martín	3–0	Deportivo Wanka	25–13	25–22	25–18			75–53	
18 Feb	Universidad César Vallejo	3–2	Deportivo Alianza	16–25	25–20	15–25	26–24	16–14	98–108	
19 Feb	Sporting Cristal	3–0	Deportivo Alianza	25–21	25–20	25–17			75–58	
19 Feb	Géminis	3–2	Universidad César Vallejo	19–25	18–25	25–22	25–20	15–10	102–102	
19 Feb	Túpac Amaru	3–1	Latino Amisa	25–16	25–19	20–25	25–11		95–71	
24 Feb	Regatas Lima	3–0	Circolo Sportivo Italiano	25–17	26–24	25–23			76–64	
29 Feb	Universidad San Martín	3–0	Latino Amisa	25–21	25–17	25–18			75–56	
29 Feb	Divino Maestro	0–3	Deportivo Alianza	25–27	20–25	20–25			65–77	
2 Mar	Sporting Cristal	3–2	Regatas Lima	22–25	25–13	25–22	14–25	15–11	101–96	
2 Mar	Géminis	3–1	Túpac Amaru	25–21	25–13	11–25	25–22		86–82	
3 Mar	Deportivo Wanka	3–1	Deportivo Alianza	25–12	25–23	10–25	25–16		85–76	
3 Mar	Universidad San Martín	2–3	Túpac Amaru	22–25	25–14	18–25	25–10	10–15	90–89	
3 Mar	Regatas Lima	1–3	Universidad César Vallejo	21–25	25–15	14–25	17–25		77–90	
4 Mar	Alianza Lima	3–2	Deportivo Wanka	26–24	22–25	23–25	25–19	16–14	112–107	
4 Mar	Géminis	3–0	Circolo Sportivo Italiano	25–16	25–18	25–19			75–53	
4 Mar	Sporting Cristal	1–3	Universidad César Vallejo	19–25	25–21	26–28	19–25		89–99	
7 Mar	Divino Maestro	3–0	Regatas Lima	27–25	25–23	25–21			77–69	
7 Mar	Alianza Lima	3–1	Latino Amisa	20–25	26–24	25–22	25–16		96–87	
9 Mar	Sporting Cristal	2–3	Circolo Sportivo Italiano	25–20	22–25	18–25	25–20	9–15	99–105	
9 Mar	Géminis	3–2	Universidad San Martín	25–18	25–22	12–25	25–27	15–13	102–105	
10 Mar	Alianza Lima	3–0	Túpac Amaru	25–20	25–21	25–23			75–64	
10 Mar	Latino Amisa	3–0	Deportivo Alianza	30–28	25–16	26–24			81–68	
10 Mar	Universidad César Vallejo	3–1	Deportivo Wanka	25–23	19–25	25–18	25–20		94–86	
11 Mar	Túpac Amaru	1–3	Deportivo Alianza	25–12	29–31	22–25	20–25		96–93	
11 Mar	Divino Maestro	3–2	Universidad César Vallejo	26–24	25–20	19–25	20–25	15–11	105–105	
11 Mar	Regatas Lima	1–3	Deportivo Wanka	23–25	25–19	23–25	16–25		87–94	
14 Mar	Latino Amisa	3–1	Regatas Lima	25–18	27–25	21–25	25–11		98–79	
14 Mar	Géminis	3–0	Sporting Cristal	25–22	25–23	25–13			75–58	
16 Mar	Divino Maestro	0–3	Circolo Sportivo Italiano	23–25	18–25	21–25			62–75	
16 Mar	Alianza Lima	2–3	Universidad San Martín	19–25	25–18	25–18	16–25	12–15	97–101	
17 Mar	Circolo Sportivo Italiano	3–2	Deportivo Wanka	25–27	25–12	18–25	25–13	15–8	108–85	
17 Mar	Universidad César Vallejo	2–3	Latino Amisa	26–24	25–21	22–25	24–26	6–15	103–111	
17 Mar	Divino Maestro	3–2	Sporting Cristal	25–22	13–25	20–25	25–20	15–13	98–105	
17 Mar	Túpac Amaru	3–0	Regatas Lima	25–18	25–21	25–23			75–62	
18 Mar	Sporting Cristal	3–0	Deportivo Wanka	25–14	25–19	25–23			75–56	
18 Mar	Túpac Amaru	3–0	Universidad César Vallejo	25–19	25–23	25–15			75–57	
18 Mar	Géminis	3–1	Alianza Lima	25–13	25–17	23–25	25–19		98–74	
18 Mar	Universidad San Martín	3–0	Deportivo Alianza	25–23	25–12	25–23			75–58	
21 Mar	Circolo Sportivo Italiano	1–3	Latino Amisa	19–25	25–20	14–25	14–25		72–95	
21 Mar	Universidad San Martín	3–0	Regatas Lima	25–18	25–22	25–15			75–55	
23 Mar	Alianza Lima	3–0	Deportivo Alianza	25–10	25–20	25–21			75–51	
23 Mar	Géminis	3–1	Divino Maestro	25–13	25–18	24–26	25–13		99–70	

== Cuadrangular por la permanencia ==
Ranking

Pos	Team	Pld	W	L	Pts	SPW	SPL	SPR	SW	SL	SR	Qualification
1	Unión Vallejo Tarapoto	3	3	0	9	243	177	1.373	9	1	9.000	
2	Deportivo Alianza	3	2	1	6	226	200	1.130	7	3	2.333	Relegation to 2012–23 LNIV
3	Asociación Huaquillay	3	1	2	3	206	240	0.858	3	7	0.429	Relegation to 2012–23 LNIV
4	ABC San Felipe	3	0	3	0	189	247	0.765	1	9	0.111	Relegation to 2012–23 LNIV

=== Results ===
==== Round 1 ====
Date		Score		Set 1	Set 2	Set 3	Set 4	Set 5	Total	Report
13 Apr	Unión Vallejo Tarapoto	3–0	Asociación Huaquillay	25–18	25–13	25–20			75–51	
13 Apr	Deportivo Alianza	3–0	ABC San Felipe	25–19	25–12	25–18			75–49	

==== Round 2 ====
Date		Score		Set 1	Set 2	Set 3	Set 4	Set 5	Total	Report
14 Apr	Unión Vallejo Tarapoto	3–0	ABC San Felipe	25–17	25–14	25–19			75–50	
14 Apr	Deportivo Alianza	3–0	Asociación Huaquillay	25–21	25–21	25–16			75–58	

==== Round 3 ====
Date		Score		Set 1	Set 2	Set 3	Set 4	Set 5	Total	Report
15 Apr	Asociación Huaquillay	3–1	ABC San Felipe	25–20	21–25	25–21	26–24		97–90	
15 Apr	Unión Vallejo Tarapoto	3–1	Deportivo Alianza	18–25	25–12	25–19	25–20		93–76	

== Final round ==
The final round of the tournament is a knockout stage, teams play the quarterfinals seeded according to how they finished ranking-wise in the second round. The Final Round will begin March 24, 2012 and it is expected to crown the champion team April 14, 2012. This round is played best-out-of-three games, for a team to move on to the next stage, they have to win twice against the opposite team.

Quarterfinals
Géminis	2
Latino Amisa	0
Divino Maestro	2
Túpac Amaru	0
Universidad San Martín	2
Universidad César Vallejo	0
Alianza Lima	2
Sporting Cristal	1

Semifinals
Géminis	2
Divino Maestro	1
Universidad San Martín	2
Alianza Lima	1

Gold-medal match
Géminis	2
Universidad San Martín	0
Bronze-medal match
Alianza Lima	0
Divino Maestro	2

=== Quarterfinals ===
Team 1	Agg.	Team 2	1st leg	2nd leg
Géminis	2–0	Latino Amisa	3–0	3–0
Universidad San Martín	2–0	Universidad César Vallejo	3–0	3–1
Alianza Lima	2–1^{1}	Sporting Cristal	2–3	3–2
Divino Maestro	2–0	Túpac Amaru	3–0	3–2

^{1}Alianza Lima won third leg 3–2.

==== First leg ====
Date		Score		Set 1	Set 2	Set 3	Set 4	Set 5	Total	Report
24 Mar	Alianza Lima	2–3	Sporting Cristal	25–15	25–18	20–25	27–29	4–15	101–102	
24 Mar	Divino Maestro	3–0	Túpac Amaru	25–19	25–16	25–23			75–58	
25 Mar	Universidad San Martín	3–0	Universidad César Vallejo	25–16	25–23	25–16			75–55	
25 Mar	Géminis	3–0	Latino Amisa	25–20	25–14	25–15			75–49	

==== Second leg ====
Date		Score		Set 1	Set 2	Set 3	Set 4	Set 5	Total	Report
28 Mar	Sporting Cristal	2–3	Alianza Lima	22–25	25–23	16–25	25–20	12–15	108–100	
28 Mar	Túpac Amaru	2–3	Divino Maestro	21–25	25–21	25–22	18–25	13–15	102–108	
30 Mar	Universidad César Vallejo	1–3	Universidad San Martín	25–20	18–25	16–25	20–25		79–95	
30 Mar	Latino Amisa	0–3	Géminis	16–25	20–25	22–25			58–75	

==== Extra Games ====
Date		Score		Set 1	Set 2	Set 3	Set 4	Set 5	Total	Report
04 Abr	Alianza Lima	3–2	Sporting Cristal	25–19	25–27	25–22	20–25	17–15	112–108	

=== Bronze-medal matches ===
Team 1	Agg.	Team 2	1st leg	2nd leg
Alianza Lima	0–2	Divino Maestro	0–3	0–3

==== First leg ====
Date		Score		Set 1	Set 2	Set 3	Set 4	Set 5	Total	Report
11 Abr	Alianza Lima	0–3	Divino Maestro	17–25	10–25	21–25			48–75	

==== Second leg ====
Date		Score		Set 1	Set 2	Set 3	Set 4	Set 5	Total	Report
13 Abr	Divino Maestro	3–0	Alianza Lima	25–16	25–12	25–15			75–43	

=== Gold-medal matches ===
Team 1	Agg.	Team 2	1st leg	2nd leg
Géminis	2–0	Universidad San Martín	3–0	3–1

==== First leg ====
Date		Score		Set 1	Set 2	Set 3	Set 4	Set 5	Total	Report
11 Abr	Géminis	3–0	Universidad San Martín	25–21	25–15	25–14				

==== Second leg ====
Date		Score		Set 1	Set 2	Set 3	Set 4	Set 5	Total	Report
13 Abr	Universidad San Martín	1–3	Géminis	25–20	25–27	20–25	14–25		84–97	

== Final standing ==
Rank	Team
1st place, gold medalist(s)	Géminis
2nd place, silver medalist(s)	Universidad San Martín
3rd place, bronze medalist(s)	Divino Maestro
4	Alianza Lima
5	Sporting Cristal
6	Tupac Amaru
7	Universidad César Vallejo
8	Latino Amisa
9	Circolo Sportivo Italiano
10	Regatas Lima
11	Deportivo Wanka
12	Deportivo Alianza

Team qualified for the 2012 South American Club Championship
Team lost A1 category

2011–12 Liga Nacional Superior de Voleibol Champions

Géminis
3rd title

Team Roster:

Sara Joya, Lesly Díaz, Ingrid Herrada, Patricia Soto, Milagros Rodríguez, Yvón Cancino, Danae Carranza (L), Grecia Herrada, Florencia Busquets, Kiara Carrión, Alison Lora,

Carla Rueda
Head Coach: Enrique Briceño

=== Controversy ===
Géminis qualified to the 2012 South American Club Championship, however the club declined to go.

Universidad San Martín as second best was invited to go, the team accepted; however the club also declined to go just a week before the competition. Cenaida Uribe, team manager quoted that since the club was not the winning team of the season, they were not given information about the Continental Club Championship.

So far, either the FPV or the LNSV has officially spoken about the qualification of Peruvian teams to the Club Championship and/or how to prevent this from happening again.

== Individual awards ==
- Most valuable player
  - (Peru) Patricia Soto (Deportivo Géminis)
- Best scorer
  - (Peru) Daniela Uribe (Alianza Lima)
- Best spiker
  - (Dominican Republic) Yonkaira Peña (Universidad San Martín)
- Best blocker
  - (Dominican Republic) Cándida Arias (Universidad San Martín)
- Best server
  - (Peru) Mirian Patiño (Túpac Amaru)
- Best digger
  - (Peru) Mirian Patiño (Túpac Amaru)
- Best setter
  - (Peru) Yvon Cancino (Deportivo Géminis)
- Best receiver
  - (Peru) Janice Torres (Túpac Amaru)
- Best libero
  - (Peru) Vanessa Palacios (Divino Maestro)
