= Rosa García =

Peruvian volleyball player

Personal information
- Full name: Rosa Gisella García Rivas
- Nickname: China
- Born: 21 May 1964 (age 62); Lima, Peru
- Height: 1.75 m (5 ft 9 in)
- Weight: 69 kg (152 lb)

Volleyball information
- Position: Setter
- Number: 3

National team
| 1980–2000 | Peru |
Medal record
Women's volleyball
Representing Peru
Olympic Games
| Silver medal – second place | 1988 Seoul | Team |
World Championship
| Silver medal – second place | 1982 Peru |
| Bronze medal – third place | 1986 Czechoslovakia | Team |
Goodwill Games
| Silver medal – second place | 1986 Moscow |
Pan American Games
| Silver medal – second place | 1987 Indianapolis | Team |
| Bronze medal – third place | 1983 Caracas | Team |
| Bronze medal – third place | 1991 Havana | Team |
CSV South American Championship
| Gold medal – first place | 1983 São Paulo |
| Gold medal – first place | 1985 Caracas |
| Gold medal – first place | 1987 Punta del Este |
| Gold medal – first place | 1989 Curitiba |
| Gold medal – first place | 1993 Cusco |
| Silver medal – second place | 1981 Santo André |
| Silver medal – second place | 1991 São Paulo |
| Silver medal – second place | 1995 Porto Alegre |
| Silver medal – second place | 1997 Lima |
| Bronze medal – third place | 1999 Valencia |

Rosa Gisella García Rivas (born 21 May 1964), more commonly known as Rosa García, is a retired women's volleyball player from Peru who is a four-time Olympian. García was on the Peruvian national team that finished fourth at the 1984 Summer Olympics in Los Angeles, and was a silver medalist at the 1988 Summer Olympics in Seoul. She also was a member of the Peruvian team that won the silver medal in the 1982 FIVB World Championship in Peru. She was a setter.

García was the national flag bearer at the 2000 Summer Olympics in Sydney.

Olympic Games
| Preceded by Juan Giha | Flag bearer for Peru; Sydney 2000 | Succeeded by Francisco Boza |
