= Miriam Gallardo =

Peruvian volleyball player (born 1968)

Personal information
- Full name: Miriam Isabel Gallardo Tenemás
- Born: 2 May 1968 (age 58); Lima, Peru
- Height: 1.80 m (5 ft 11 in)
- Weight: 57 kg (126 lb)

Volleyball information
- Position: Outside hitter
- Number: 10 (1984); 4 (1988)

National team
1984–1994	Peru
Medal record
Women's volleyball
Representing Peru
Olympic Games
Silver medal – second place	1988 Seoul	Team
World Championship
Bronze medal – third place	1986 Czechoslovakia	Team
Goodwill Games
Silver medal – second place	1986 Moscow
Pan American Games
Silver medal – second place	1987 Indianapolis	Team
Bronze medal – third place	1991 Havana	Team
CSV South American Championship
Gold medal – first place	1985 Caracas
Gold medal – first place	1987 Punta del Este
Gold medal – first place	1989 Curitiba
Gold medal – first place	1993 Cusco
Silver medal – second place	1991 São Paulo

Miriam Isabel Gallardo Tenemás (born 2 May 1968), more commonly known as Miriam Gallardo, is a retired volleyball player from Peru. Gallardo won the silver medal with the Peruvian women's national volleyball team at the 1988 Summer Olympics in Seoul. She also competed at the 1984 Summer Olympics in Los Angeles.
