= Cecilia Tait =

Peruvian volleyball player and politician

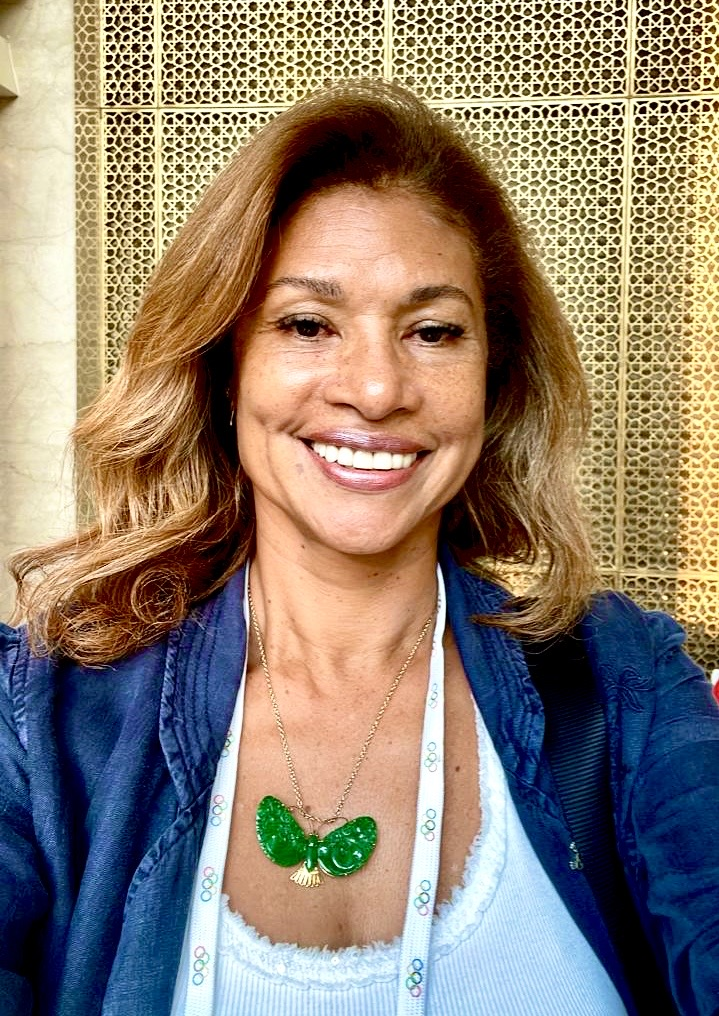
- Cecilia Tait - IOC Member since 2023

Personal information
- Full name: Cecilia Roxana Tait Villacorta
- Nickname: La Zurda de Oro ("The Golden Lefty")
- Born: 5 March 1962 (age 64); Lima, Peru
- Height: 1.82 m (6 ft 0 in)
- Weight: 70 kg (154 lb)

Volleyball information
- Position: Opposite
- Number: 7

National team
1978–1988	Peru
Honours
Women's volleyball
Representing Peru
Olympic Games
Silver medal – second place	1988 Seoul	Team
World Championship
Silver medal – second place	1982 Peru
Bronze medal – third place	1986 Czechoslovakia	Team
Goodwill Games
Silver medal – second place	1986 Moscow
Pan American Games
Silver medal – second place	1979 Caguas	Team
Silver medal – second place	1987 Indianapolis	Team
Bronze medal – third place	1983 Caracas	Team
CSV South American Championship
Gold medal – first place	1979 Rosario
Gold medal – first place	1983 São Paulo
Gold medal – first place	1985 Caracas
Gold medal – first place	1987 Punta del Este
Silver medal – second place	1981 Santo André

Cecilia Roxana Tait Villacorta (born 5 March 1962) is a Peruvian politician and retired volleyball player. She was a key player in the rise of the Peruvian women's national volleyball team in the 1980s.

== Sports career ==
Nicknamed "La Zurda de Oro" ("The Golden Lefty"), Tait participated in three Summer Olympics with the Peru national team, finishing sixth in 1980, fourth in 1984, and winning a silver medal at the 1988 Summer Olympics in Seoul, where she was the team captain. She was a member of the Peruvian team that won the silver medal at the 1982 FIVB World Championship in Peru, and the bronze medal at the 1986 FIVB World Championship in Czechoslovakia. She won a silver medal at the 1979 Pan American Games in Caguas, a bronze medal at the 1983 Pan American Games in Caracas, and a silver medal at the 1987 Pan American Games in Indianapolis.

In 2005, Tait was inducted into the International Volleyball Hall of Fame.

== Political career ==
In 1998, Tait entered politics, becoming elected municipal councillor in Villa María del Triunfo, representing the Fujimorist party Vamos Vecino of President Alberto Fujimori. Tait was elected Congresswoman in 2000, representing Perú Posible. She was the first Afro-Peruvian elected to Peru's Congress.

The resignation of President Alberto Fujimori led to new elections the following year in which she was reelected for the period 2001–2006. Tait sponsored several bills approved by the Congress that expanded sports programs for both the country's most talented athletes and poor school children as well. She failed to attain reelection in 2006, but she was re-elected to Congress in 2011 and left office in 2016 after she failed to attain re-election under the Peruvians for Change party.

== See also ==
- List of Afro-Latinos
