= Iris Falcón =

Peruvian volleyball player

Personal information
- Full name: Iris Rocío Falcón Lurita
- Born: 1 November 1973 (age 52)
- Height: 1.75 m (5 ft 9 in)
- Weight: 78 kg (172 lb)
- Spike: 300 cm (118 in)
- Block: 293 cm (115 in)

Volleyball information
- Position: Outside hitter
- Number: 2

National team
1993–2000	Peru
Honours
Women's volleyball
Representing Peru
South American Championship
Silver medal – second place	1995 Porto Alegre
Silver medal – second place	1997 Lima

Iris Rocio Falcón Lurita (born 1 November 1973), more commonly known as Iris Falcón, is a Peruvian former volleyball player who played for the Peruvian women's national volleyball team at the 1996 Summer Olympics in Atlanta and the 2000 Summer Olympics in Sydney, finishing eleventh in both tournaments.

Falcón also competed at the 1994 FIVB World Championship in Brazil and the 1998 FIVB World Championship in Japan.
