= Jessica Tejada =

Peruvian volleyball player

Personal information
- Born: Jessica Carola Tejada Guzmán; 28 February 1971 (age 55); Lima, Peru
- Height: 1.76 m (5 ft 9 in)
- Spike: 298 cm (117 in)
- Block: 292 cm (115 in)

Volleyball information
- Position: Setter
- Number: 16

National team
1989–2000	Peru
Honours
Women's volleyball
Representing Peru
CSV South American Championship
Gold medal – first place	1989 Curitiba
Silver medal – second place	1991 São Paulo
Silver medal – second place	1997 Lima

Jessica Tejada (born 28 February 1971) is a Peruvian female volleyball player. She is a setter and currently plays for Universitario de Deportes Club of Perú.

Tejada was part of the Peruvian women's national volleyball team at the 1998 FIVB World Championship in Japan.

== Club volleyball ==
Tejada played for Alianza Lima from 1990 to 1993, winning a total of three national championships with the team. She then played for Regatas Lima in 1996.
