= Yolanda Delgado =

Peruvian volleyball player

Margarita Delgado
Personal information
- Full name: Margarita Yolanda Delgado Prada
- Nationality: Peruvian
- Born: 30 January 1970 (age 56)

Volleyball information
- Position: Opposite
- Number: 17

National team
- Years: Team
- 1989–1996: Peru
Honours
Women's volleyball
Representing Peru
Pan American Games
Bronze medal – third place	1991 Havana	Team
CSV South American Championship
Gold medal – first place	1989 Curitiba
Gold medal – first place	1993 Cusco
Silver medal – second place	1991 Osasco

Margarita Delgado (born 30 January 1970) is a Peruvian former volleyball player. She competed in the women's tournament at the 1996 Summer Olympics in Atlanta. Delgado won a bronze medal with the Peruvian team at the 1991 Pan American Games in Havana.
