= Gabriela Pérez del Solar =

Peruvian volleyball player and politician

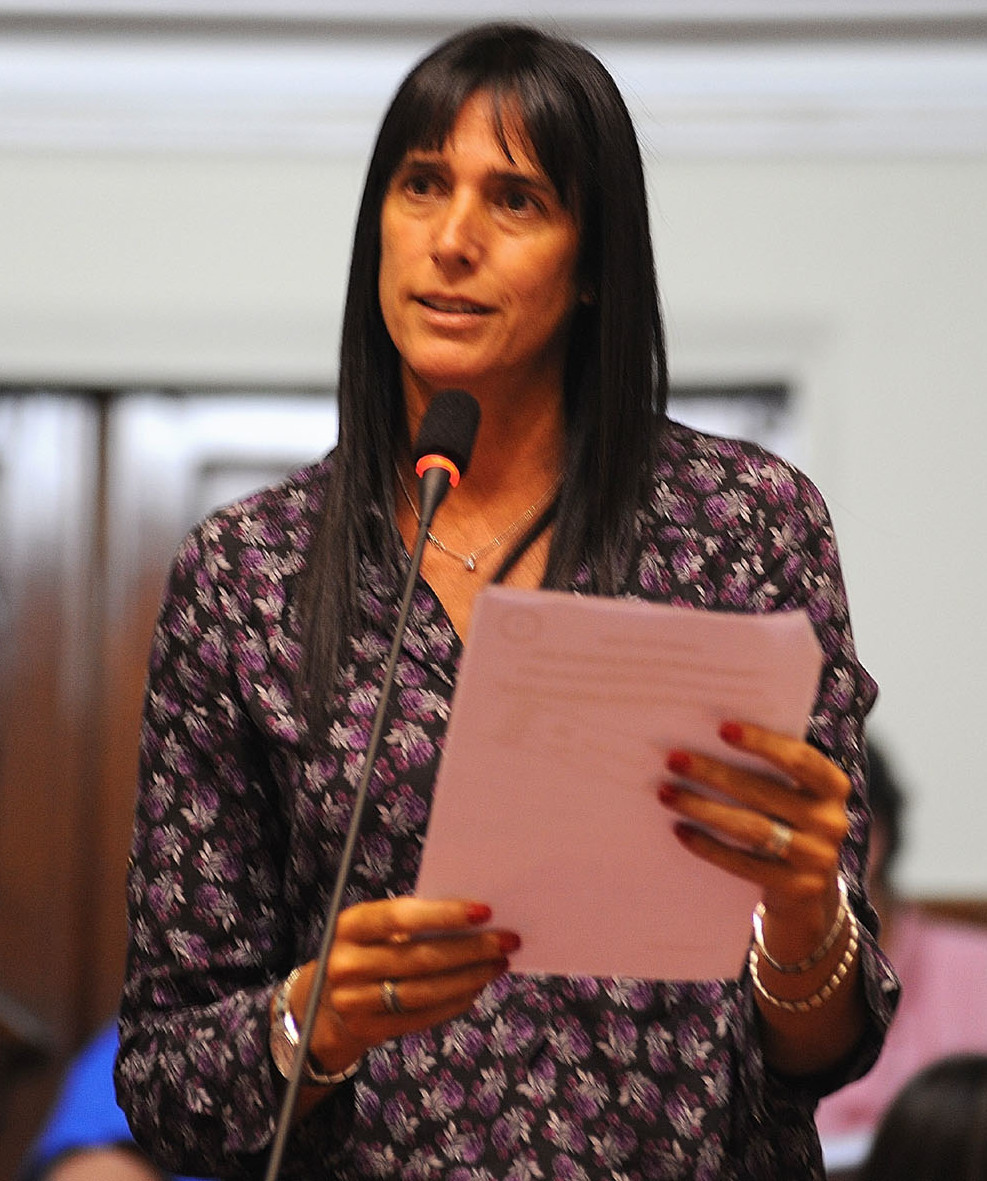
- Pérez del Solar in 2012

Personal information
- Full name: Gabriela Lourdes Pérez del Solar Cuculiza
- Nickname: Gaby
- Born: 10 July 1968 (age 58); Ica, Peru
- Height: 1.94 m (6 ft 4 in)
- Weight: 72 kg (159 lb)

Volleyball information
- Position: Middle blocker
- Number: 5

National team
1983–1993	Peru
Honours
Women's volleyball
Representing Peru
Olympic Games
Silver medal – second place	1988 Seoul	Team
World Championship
Bronze medal – third place	1986 Czechoslovakia	Team
Goodwill Games
Silver medal – second place	1986 Moscow
Pan American Games
Silver medal – second place	1987 Indianapolis	Team
Bronze medal – third place	1991 Havana	Team
CSV South American Championship
Gold medal – first place	1985 Caracas
Gold medal – first place	1987 Punta del Este
Gold medal – first place	1989 Curitiba
Gold medal – first place	1993 Cusco
Silver medal – second place	1991 São Paulo

Gabriela Pérez del Solar

Member of the Congress
- In office 26 July 2006 – 26 July 2016
- Constituency: Lima

Personal details
- Party: Christian People's Party

Gabriela "Gaby" Lourdes Pérez del Solar Cuculiza (born 10 July 1968) is a Peruvian former volleyball player and two-time Olympian. Following her sports career, she entered politics and served as a Congresswoman of the Christian People's Party.

In 2010, Pérez del Solar was inducted into the International Volleyball Hall of Fame.

== Sports career ==
Pérez del Solar began to play volleyball at 14 years old. Her 1.94 m height helped her to become an internationally respected middle blocker. While representing Peru at just 16 years old, she finished in fourth place in the 1984 Summer Olympics in Los Angeles.

Pérez del Solar began to show her abilities for the sport in the 1985 FIVB World Cup in Japan, and at just 17 years old was chosen as the best blocker of the tournament and finished in fifth place. She also won the gold medal in the 1985 South American Championship. She won the bronze medal in the 1986 FIVB World Championship in Czechoslovakia and silver in the 1987 Pan American Games in Indianapolis. She won the gold medal in the 1987 South American Championship in Punta del Este and 1987 Japan Cup, where she was awarded best spiker. She was a member of the team that won the silver medal in the 1988 Summer Olympics in Seoul, and was selected as the best receiver.

Pérez del Solar won the 1988 Top Four bronze medal, 1989 South American Championship gold medal in Curitiba, and finished in fifth place in the 1989 FIVB World Cup in Japan. She finished sixth in the 1990 FIVB World Championship in China and won the bronze medal in the 1991 Pan American Games in Havana, silver in the 1991 South American Championship in São Paulo, and finished fifth in the 1991 FIVB World Cup in Japan. She retired from the Peruvian national team after winning the 1993 South American Championship in Cuzco.

== In Italy ==
After retiring in Peru, Pérez del Solar played volleyball in Italy. She was invited to become a member of the Italian national team but rejected the offer.

== Political life ==
In 2005, the then-presidential candidate Lourdes Flores Nano invited Pérez del Solar to run for Congress and she accepted. In the general elections of 2006, she was elected with the most votes in her district and fifth highest number of votes in the nation. In April 2006, she became a member of the National Unity, in a ceremony prepared by Xavier Barrón and Lourdes Flores. In the 2011 election, she was re-elected for another five-year term on the ticket of the Alliance for the Great Change to which the Christian People's Party now belongs.

== Awards ==
=== Individuals ===
- 1985 World Cup "Best Blocker"
- 1986 World Championship "Best Blocker"
- 1988 Olympics "Best Receiver"
- 1991 World Cup "Best Blocker"
- 1993 South American Championship "Best Blocker"

=== Clubs ===
- 3 Italian Cups (1990, 1991, 1993)
