= Sandra Rodriguez =

Peruvian volleyball player (born 1974)

Sandra Rodriguez V.

Personal information
- Nationality: Peruvian
- Born: 12 April 1974 (age 52)
- Height: 190 cm (6 ft 3 in)

Career
Years	Teams
1994	Latino Amisa

National team
1994-1996	Peru

Sandra Rodriguez V. (born 12 April 1974) is a Peruvian female volleyball player. She was part of the Peru Women's National Volleyball Team.

== Career ==
She competed at the 1996 Summer Olympics, and the 1994 FIVB Volleyball Women's World Championship. On club level, she played with Latino Amisa.

== Clubs ==
- Latino Amisa (1994)
