= Natalia Romanova =

Peruvian volleyball player

Personal information
- Full name: Natalia Romanova De Duarte
- Nationality: Peruvian
- Born: November 12, 1972 (age 53); Kazakhstan, Soviet Union
- Hometown: Lima
- Height: 1.85 m (6 ft 1 in)
- Weight: 69 kg (152 lb)
- Spike: 298 cm (117 in)
- Block: 303 cm (119 in)

Volleyball information
- Position: Opposite

National team
2003–	Peru
Honours
Women's volleyball
Representing Peru
South American Championship
Bronze medal – third place	2003 Bogotá	Team
- Last updated: June 2010

Natalia Romanova (born November 11, 1972) is a retired Soviet Union-born female volleyball player from Peru who competed at the 2006 FIVB World Championship in Japan. Her team finished in 17th place. Romanova married Luis Duarte and obtained Peruvian citizenship.

She played in Spain with the Spanish clubs CV Albacete and Voley Sanse Mepaban after being played for the Italian Palermo.

== Clubs ==
- (Greece) Olympiacos Piraeus (1997–1999)
- (Greece) Panathinaikos (1999–2001)
- (Peru) Regatas Lima (2001–2002)
- (Italy) Città di Palermo (2002–2003)
- (Spain) Albacete (2003–2008)
- (Spain) Voley Sanse Mepaban (2008–2009)

== Awards ==
=== National team ===
==== Senior team ====
- 2005 Bolivarian Games, Gold Medal
- 2003 South American Championship, Bronze Medal
