= Luisa Cervera =

Peruvian volleyball player

Personal information
- Full name: Luisa Haydee Cervera Cevedon
- Nickname: La Gata (The Cat)
- Born: 4 June 1964 (age 62); Lima, Peru
- Height: 1.73 m (5 ft 8 in)
- Weight: 70 kg (154 lb)

Volleyball information
- Position: Middle blocker
- Number: 8

National team
1984–1988	Peru
Medal record
Women's volleyball
Representing Peru
Olympic Games
Silver medal – second place	1988 Seoul	Team
World Championship
Bronze medal – third place	1986 Czechoslovakia	Team
Goodwill Games
Silver medal – second place	1986 Moscow
Pan American Games
Silver medal – second place	1987 Indianapolis	Team
CSV South American Championship
Gold medal – first place	1985 Caracas
Gold medal – first place	1987 Punta del Este

Luisa Haydee Cervera Cevedon (born 4 July 1964, in Lima), more commonly known as Luisa Cervera, is a former Peruvian volleyball player. Cervera received a silver medal at the 1988 Olympic Games in Seoul, after playing the Soviet Union in the final. She also participated in the 1984 Olympic Games in Los Angeles, where Peru reached the semifinals and lost to the United States, finishing fourth.
