= Yulissa Zamudio =

Peruvian volleyball player

Personal information
- Full name: Yulissa Noelia Zamudio Ore
- Nationality: Peruvian
- Born: 24 March 1976 (age 50)
- Education: Universidad San Martín
- Height: 1.85 m (6 ft 1 in)

Volleyball information
- Position: Middle blocker
- Number: 14 (1996); 7 (2000)

National team
- Years: Team
- 1991–2000, 2006–2014: Peru
Honours
Women's volleyball
Representing Peru
Pan American Games
Bronze medal – third place	1991 Havana	Team
South American Championship
Silver medal – second place	1995 Porto Alegre
Silver medal – second place	1997 Lima
Silver medal – second place	2007 Rancagua / Santiago
Bronze medal – third place	2011 Callao
Bronze medal – third place	2013 Ica

Yulissa Noelia Zamudio Ore (born 24 March 1976), more commonly known as Yulissa Zamudio, is a Peruvian former volleyball player. Zamudio competed with the Peruvian women's national volleyball team at the 1996 Summer Olympics in Atlanta and the 2000 Summer Olympics in Sydney, finishing in eleventh place in both tournaments. She was a middle blocker.

Zamudio competed at the 2010 FIVB World Championship in Japan.

== Club volleyball ==
Zamudio played club volleyball for Alianza Lima, AD A Pinguela, and Latino Amisa.
