= Milagros Cámere =

Peruvian volleyball player (1972–2024)

Personal information
- Full name: Milagros Beatriz Cámere Puga
- Nickname: La Zurda de Plata ("The Silver Lefty")
- Nationality: Peruvian
- Born: 22 September 1972
- Died: 5 May 2024 (aged 51)
- Height: 1.78 m (5 ft 10 in)
- Weight: 63 kg (139 lb)

Volleyball information
- Position: Outside hitter
- Number: 7 (1996); 17 (2000)

National team
1991–2000	Peru
Medal record
Women's volleyball
Representing Peru
Pan American Games
Bronze medal – third place	1991 Havana	Team
South American Championship
Gold medal – first place	1993 Cusco
Silver medal – second place	1991 Osasco
Silver medal – second place	1995 Porto Alegre
Silver medal – second place	1997 Lima
Bronze medal – third place	1999 Valencia

Milagros Beatriz Cámere Puga (22 September 1972 – 5 May 2024), more commonly known as Milagros Cámere, was a Peruvian volleyball player. Cámere played with the Peruvian women's national volleyball team at the 1996 Summer Olympics in Atlanta and the 2000 Summer Olympics in Sydney, finishing eleventh in both events. She was nicknamed "La Zurda de Plata" ("The Silver Lefty").

Cámere also represented Peru at the 1994 FIVB World Championship in Brazil and the 1998 FIVB World Championship in Japan.

== Personal life and death ==
Cámere died on 5 May 2024, at the age of 51.

== See also ==
- Peru at the 2000 Summer Olympics
