= Aurora Heredia =

Peruvian volleyball player

Personal information
- Full name: Clara Aurora Heredia Condemaria
- Born: 13 September 1959 (age 67); Lima, Peru
- Height: 1.76 m (5 ft 9 in)

Volleyball information
- Position: Setter
- Number: 10

National team
1977–1985	Peru
Medal record
Women's volleyball
Representing Peru
World Championship
Silver medal – second place	1982 Peru
Pan American Games
Silver medal – second place	1979 Caguas	Team
Bronze medal – third place	1983 Caracas	Team
CSV South American Championship
Gold medal – first place	1979 Rosario
Gold medal – first place	1985 Caracas

Clara Aurora Heredia Condemaria (born 13 September 1959), commonly referred to as Aurora Heredia, is a Peruvian former volleyball player who competed in the 1980 Summer Olympics in Moscow. Heredia was also a member of the Peruvian team that won the silver medal in the 1982 FIVB World Championship in Peru.
