= Carmen Pimentel =

Peruvian volleyball player (born 1961)

Personal information
- Full name: Teresa Carmen Pimentel Peschiera
- Born: 2 August 1961 (age 65); Lima, Peru
- Height: 1.71 m (5 ft 7 in)

Volleyball information
- Position: Setter
- Number: 1

National team
1977–1985	Peru
Medal record
Women's volleyball
Representing Peru
World Championship
Silver medal – second place	1982 Peru
Pan American Games
Silver medal – second place	1979 Caguas	Team
Bronze medal – third place	1983 Caracas	Team
CSV South American Championship
Gold medal – first place	1979 Rosario
Gold medal – first place	1985 Caracas
Silver medal – second place	1981 Santo André

Carmen Pimentel (born 2 August 1961) is a Peruvian former volleyball player who competed in the 1980 Summer Olympics in Moscow and the 1984 Summer Olympics in Los Angeles. She was a member of the Peruvian team that won the silver medal at the 1982 FIVB World Championship in Peru. She was a setter.
