= Cenaida Uribe =

Peruvian volleyball player and politician

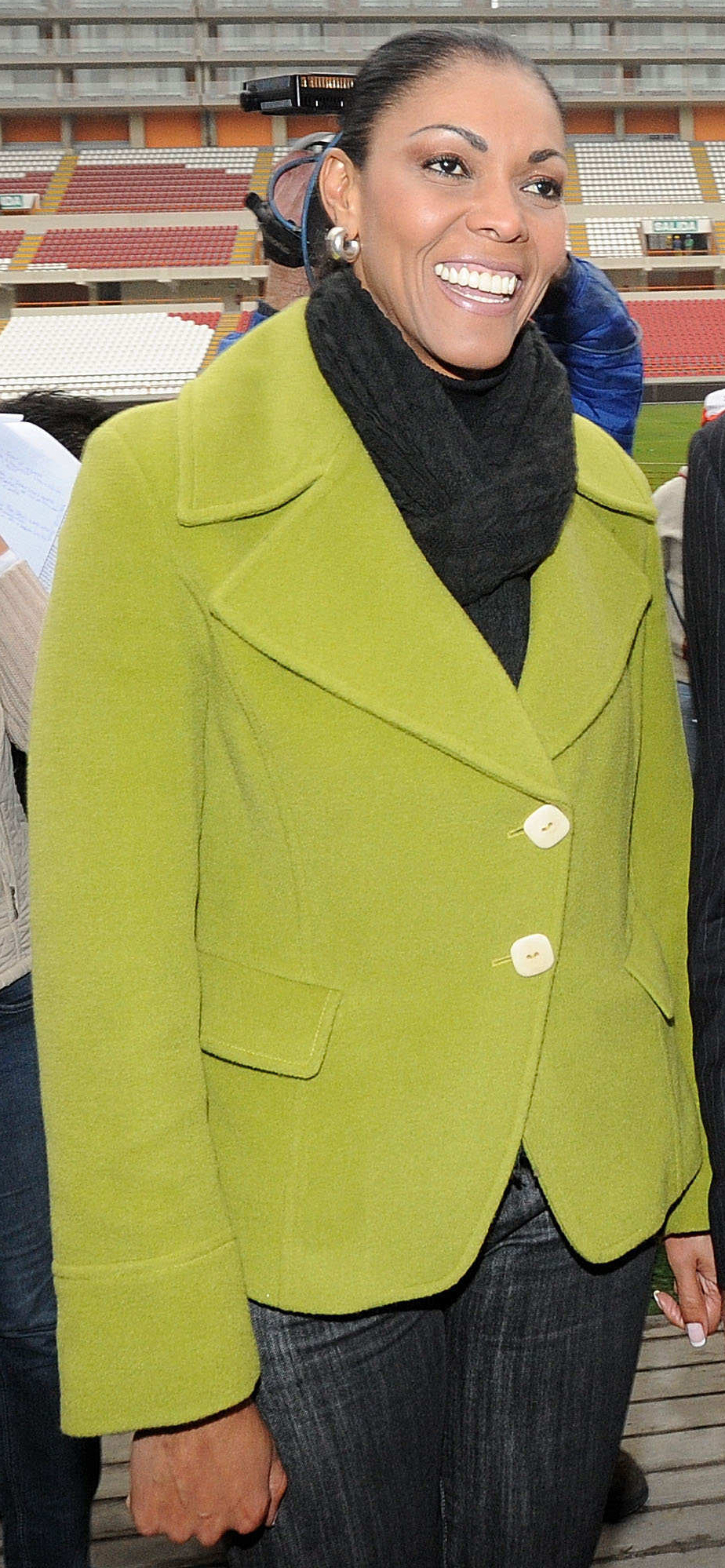
- Uribe in 2011

Personal information
- Full name: Cenaida Cebastiana Uribe Medina
- Born: 2 December 1965 (age 60); Lima, Peru
- Height: 1.74 m (5 ft 9 in)

Volleyball information
- Position: Opposite
- Number: 2

National team
1983–1990	Peru
Honours
Women's volleyball
Representing Peru
Olympic Games
Silver medal – second place	1988 Seoul	Team
World Championship
Bronze medal – third place	1986 Czechoslovakia	Team
Goodwill Games
Silver medal – second place	1986 Moscow
Pan American Games
Silver medal – second place	1987 Indianapolis	Team
Bronze medal – third place	1983 Caracas	Team
South American Championship
Gold medal – first place	1985 Caracas
Gold medal – first place	1987 Punta del Este
Gold medal – first place	1989 Curitiba

Cenaida Cebastiana Uribe Medina (born 2 December 1965, in Lima), more commonly known as Cenaida Uribe, is a Peruvian former volleyball player and politician (PNP). During her sports career, Uribe played for the national team for many years and earned a silver medal at the 1988 Summer Olympics in Seoul. She also helped the Peruvian team win the bronze medal at the 1986 FIVB World Championship in Czechoslovakia.

== Politics ==
In 2006, Uribe ran for Congresswoman on the list of the Union for Peru, which also promoted the candidates of her Peruvian Nationalist Party. She was elected, representing the constituency of Lima for the 2006–2011 term. She was reelected for the 2011–2016 term, this time on the successful Nationalist-dominated Peru Wins list.
