= Yvon Cancino =

Peruvian volleyball player (born 1979)

Personal information
- Nationality: Peruvian
- Born: 3 March 1979 (age 47)
- Height: 170 cm (5 ft 7 in)
- Spike: 292 cm (115 in)
- Block: 290 cm (114 in)

Volleyball information

Career
- Years: Team
- 2011-12: CV Deportivo Géminis

National team
- Years: Team
- 1998, 2008: Peru

Yvon Cancino (born 3 March 1979) is a retired Peruvian female volleyball player.

She was part of the Peru women's national volleyball team at the 1998 FIVB Volleyball Women's World Championship in Japan. For the 2011–12 season she played with CV Deportivo Géminis and was the best setter at the 2011–12 Liga Nacional Superior de Voleibol Femenino.
