= Gina Torrealva =

Peruvian volleyball player

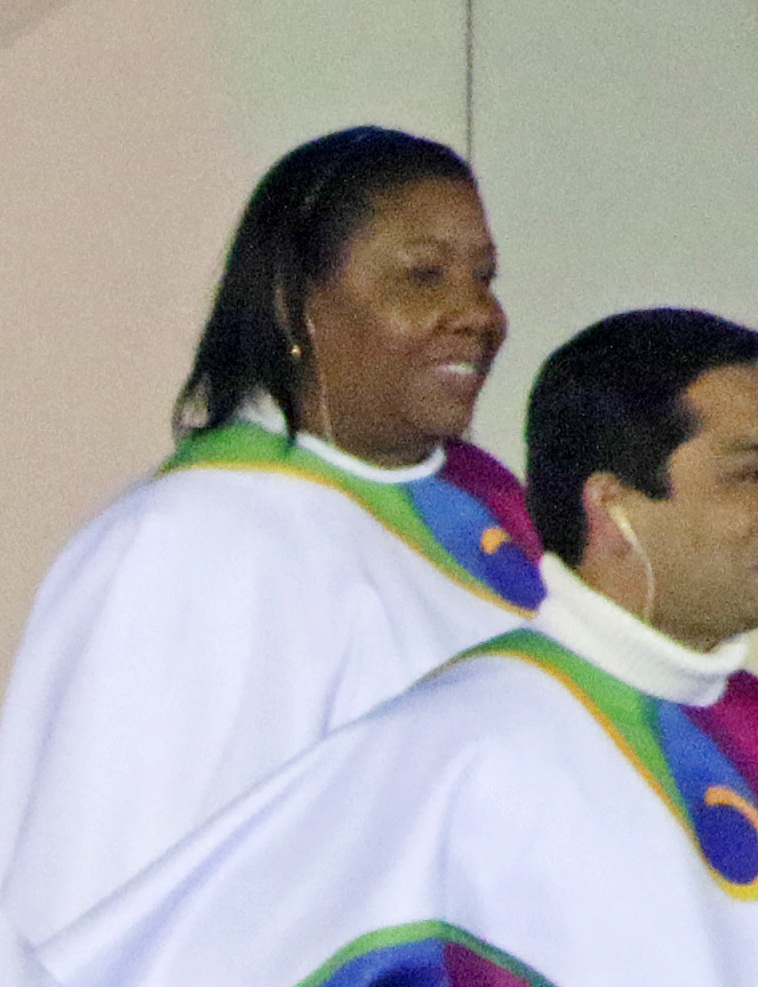
- Torrealva in 2019

Personal information
- Full name: Gina Torrealva Toledo
- Born: 16 November 1961 (age 64); Pisco, Peru
- Height: 1.75 m (5 ft 9 in)
- Weight: 59 kg (130 lb)

Volleyball information
- Position: Outside hitter
- Number: 11

National team
1979–1988	Peru
Medal record
Women's volleyball
Representing Peru
Olympic Games
Silver medal – second place	1988 Seoul	Team
World Championship
Silver medal – second place	1982 Peru
Bronze medal – third place	1986 Czechoslovakia	Team
Goodwill Games
Silver medal – second place	1986 Moscow
Pan American Games
Silver medal – second place	1979 San Juan	Team
Silver medal – second place	1987 Indianapolis	Team
Bronze medal – third place	1983 Caracas	Team
CSV South American Championship
Gold medal – first place	1979 Rosario
Gold medal – first place	1983 São Paulo
Gold medal – first place	1985 Caracas
Gold medal – first place	1987 Punta del Este
Silver medal – second place	1981 Santo André

Gina Torrealva (born 16 November 1961) is a former volleyball player from Peru and two-time Olympian. Torrealva finished fourth at the 1984 Summer Olympics in Los Angeles and won the silver medal at the 1988 Summer Olympics in Seoul. She was a member of the Peruvian team that won the silver medal at the 1982 FIVB World Championship in Peru, and the bronze medal at the 1986 FIVB World Championship in Czechoslovakia. She was an outside hitter.
