= Janet Vasconzuelos =

Peruvian volleyball player

Personal information
- Full name: Janet Daria Vasconzuelos de la Cruz
- Born: 4 July 1969 (age 57); Lima, Peru
- Height: 1.68 m (5 ft 6 in)
- Weight: 61 kg (134 lb)

Volleyball information
- Position: Libero (2000 Olympics)
- Number: 9

National team
1989–2000	Peru
Honours
Women's volleyball
Representing Peru
Pan American Games
Silver medal – second place	1987 Indianapolis	Team
Bronze medal – third place	1991 Havana	Team
CSV South American Championship
Gold medal – first place	1989 Curitiba
Gold medal – first place	1993 Cusco
Silver medal – second place	1991 São Paulo
Bronze medal – third place	1999 Valencia

Janet Vasconzuelos (born 4 July 1969) is a retired Peruvian female volleyball player. Vasconzuelos was part of the Peruvian women's national volleyball team at the 2000 Summer Olympics in Sydney, finishing eleventh. While representing Peru, she won a silver medal at the 1987 Pan American Games in Indianapolis and a bronze medal at the 1991 Pan American Games in Havana.

== Career ==
Vasconzuelos won with the Peruvian club Cristal Bancoper the silver medal in the 1995 South American Club Championship played in Medellin, Colombia.

== See also ==
- Peru at the 2000 Summer Olympics
