= Peru women's national volleyball team =

Women's national volleyball team representing Peru

Peru
- Association: Federación Peruana de Voleibol
- Confederation: CSV
- Head coach: Antonio Rizola
- FIVB ranking: 45 ▼7 (2 October 2026)

Uniforms
Home	Away

Summer Olympics
- Appearances: 7 (First in 1968)
- Best result: (1988)

World Championship
- Appearances: 12 (First in 1960)
- Best result: (1982)

World Cup
- Appearances: 10 (First in 1973)
- Best result: 4th (1973)
- (in Spanish)

The Peru women's national volleyball team represents Peru in international women's volleyball. It is governed by the Peruvian Volleyball Federation (FVF) and was one of the dominant forces in women's volleyball in the 1980s, culminating in the silver medal won at the 1988 Summer Olympics in Seoul, South Korea. The team's nickname is Las Hijas del Sol (The Sun's daughters).

== Current squad ==
As of August 2026

- Coach: (Brazil) Antonio Rizola
- Assistant coach: (Brazil) Marcello Bencardino
- Assistant coach: (Peru) Walter Lung
- Physical Trainer: (Colombia) David Torres
- U17 Category Coach: (Brazil) Marcello Bencardino
- U19 Category Coach: (Peru) Martín Escudero
- U21 Category Coach: (Brazil) Marcello Bencardino

#	Player	Birth Date	Height	2024/25 Club	Position
1.	Yadhira Anchante	19/11/2002	180	(Greece) AO Thiras	Setter
2.	Diana De la Peña	07/06/1999	187	(Peru) Alianza Lima	Middle Blocker
-.	Maria Paula Rodriguez	17/03/2002	185	(Peru) Club Cultural Deportivo Géminis	Opposite
3.	Ingrid Herrarda	11/03/1995	175	(Peru) Club Universitario de Deportes	Setter
4.	Brenda Lobatón	11/12/1997	170	(Peru) CV Universidad de San Martín de Porres	Outside Hitter
5.	Ginna López	28/25/1994	191	(Peru) CV Universidad de San Martín de Porres	Middle Blocker
6.	Aixa Vigil	23/09/2001	185	(Peru) Club Universitario de Deportes	Opposite
7.	Lucía Magallanes	01/09/1998	182	(Peru) Club Universitario de Deportes	Setter
-.	Kiara Vicente	08/10/2002	179	(Peru) Club Cultural Deportivo Géminis	Outside Hitter
8.	Sandra Ostos	10/10/1998	178	(Peru) Alianza Lima	Outside Hitter
9.	Antuanette Arteaga	15/05/2003	178	(Peru) Circolo Sportivo Italiano	Outside Hitter
10.	Mirian Patiño	28/03/1990	170	(Peru) Club Universitario de Deportes	Libero
11.	Kiara Montes	13/01/2001	178	(Peru) Regatas Lima	Outside Hitter
-.	Ángela Leyva	22/11/1996	184	(Greece) A.E.K. Athens	Outside Hitter
12.	Claudia Palza	04/07/2001	181	(Peru) Club Universitario de Deportes	Middle Blocker
13.	María José Rojas	12/07/2003	177	(Peru) Club Atlético Atenea	Setter
-.	Flavia Montes	22/11/2000	187	(Peru) Alianza Lima	Middle Blocker
14.	Alexandra Machado	28/12/1995	181	(Peru) CV Universidad de San Martín de Porres	Middle Blocker
-.	Leslie Leyva	06/12/1998	176	(Portugal) PV Colégio Efanor	Outside Hitter
16.	Xina Cortez	06/04/2006	174	(Peru) Deportivo Soan	Outside Hitter
17.	Jade Cuya	08/03/2003	177	(United States) Jacksonville University	Setter
-.	Ysabella Sanchez	02/07/1999	178	(Peru) Alianza Lima	Outside Hitter
18.	Coraima Gómez	09/08/1996	178	(Peru) Circolo Sportivo Italiano	Outside Hitter
19.	Daniela Muñoz	26/09/2001	182	(Peru) Club Universitario de Deportes	Outside Hitter
-.	Paola Villegas	12/08/1999	167	(Brazil) Esporte Clube Pinheiros	Libero
20.	Saskya Silvano	21/12/2005	183	(Peru) Club Atlético Atenea	Opposite
21.	Elizabeth Braithwaite	15/12/2006	194	(United States) Trinity Valley Community College	Middle Blocker
22.	Anghela Barboza	07/04/2003	184	(Peru) Circolo Sportivo Italiano	Middle Blocker
23.	Thaisa McLeod	01/01/2002	189	(Peru) Club Atlético Atenea	Opposite
24.	Rachell Hidalgo	12/09/2002	160	(Peru) Regatas Lima	Libero
25.	Alondra Alarcón	24/09/2004	182	(Peru) Club Cultural Deportivo Géminis	Outside Hitter
26.	Pamela Cuya	29/12/2003	158	(Peru) CV Universidad de San Martín de Porres	Libero
28.	Andrea Villegas	30/10/1999	163	(Peru) Circolo Sportivo Italiano	Libero
30.	Alondra Villanueva	12/02/2007	180	(United States) Seton Hall University	Opposite
31.	Jeissy Chia	26/04/2006	181	(Peru) Rebaza Acosta	Opposite
32.	Camila Pineda	10/07/2001	174	(Peru) Deportivo Soan	Setter

== Results ==
=== Summer Olympics ===
Champions Runners-up Third place Fourth place

Summer Olympics record
Year	Round	Position	Pld	W	L	SW	SL	Squad
(Japan) 1964	did not qualify							
(Mexico) 1968	Semifinals	4th Place	7	3	4	12	15	Squad
(West Germany) 1972	did not qualify							
(Canada) 1976	Final Round	7th Place	5	2	3	9	12	Squad
(Soviet Union) 1980	Final Round	6th Place	5	1	4	7	12	Squad
(United States) 1984	Semifinals	4th Place	5	2	3	7	11	Squad
(South Korea) 1988	Final	Silver	5	4	1	14	9	Squad
(Spain) 1992	did not qualify							
(United States) 1996	Preliminary round	11th Place	5	0	5	2	15	Squad
(Australia) 2000	Preliminary round	11th Place	5	0	5	2	15	Squad
(Greece) 2004	did not qualify							
(China) 2008	did not qualify							
(United Kingdom) 2012	did not qualify							
(Brazil) 2016	did not qualify							
(Japan) 2020	did not qualify							
(France) 2024	did not qualify							
(United States) 2028	to be determined							
(Australia) 2032	to be determined							
Total	0 Titles	7/18	37	12	25	53	89	—

=== World Championship ===
Champions Runners up Third place Fourth place

World Championship record
Year	Round	Position	Pld	W	L	SW	SL	Squad
(Soviet Union) 1952	Did Not Enter							
(France) 1956	Did Not Enter							
(Brazil) 1960	First round	7th Place	5	2	3	7	10	Squad
(Soviet Union) 1962	Did Not Enter							
(Japan) 1967	Semifinals	4th Place	3	0	3	1	9	Squad
(Bulgaria) 1970	First round	15th Place	10	2	8	7	15	Squad
(Mexico) 1974	Second round	8th Place	11	6	5	18	18	Squad
(Soviet Union) 1978	Second round	10th Place	10	4	6	17	20	Squad
(Peru) 1982	Final round	Runners-Up	10	8	2	24	7	Squad
(Czechoslovakia) 1986	Semi finals	Third Place	10	7	3	25	13	Squad
(China) 1990	Quarter finals	6th Place	7	4	3	13	10	Squad
(Brazil) 1994	First round	13th place	3	0	3	0	9	Squad
(Japan) 1998	Second round	10th Place	8	2	6	6	22	Squad
(Germany) 2002	did not qualify							
(Japan) 2006	First round	17th Place	5	1	4	9	12	Squad
(Japan) 2010	Second round	15th Place	12	2	10	11	31	Squad
(Italy) 2014	did not qualify							
(Japan) 2018	did not qualify							
(Netherlands) / (Poland) 2022	did not qualify							
(Thailand) 2025	did not qualify							
(Canada) / (United States) 2027	to be determined							
(Philippines) 2029	to be determined							
Total	0 Titles	12/22						—

=== World Cup ===
Champions Runners up Third place Fourth place

World Cup record
Year	Round	Position	Pld	W	L	SW	SL	Squad
(Uruguay) 1973	Final round	4th Place	6	3	3	9	10	Squad
(Japan) 1977	Final round	5th Place	6	4	2	15	8	Squad
(Japan) 1981	did not qualify							
(Japan) 1985	Final round	5th Place	7	3	4	9	14	Squad
(Japan) 1989	Final round	5th Place	7	2	5	9	18	Squad
(Japan) 1991	Final round	5th Place	10	4	6	20	22	Squad
(Japan) 1995	Final round	10th Place	11	2	9	7	27	Squad
(Japan) 1999	Final round	10th Place	11	2	9	13	11	Squad
(Japan) 2003	did not qualify							
(Japan) 2007	Final round	11th Place	11	1	10	6	39	Squad
(Japan) 2011	did not qualify							
(Japan) 2015	Final round	11th Place	11	1	10	9	30	Squad
(Japan) 2019	did not qualify							
(Japan) 2023	Final round	8th place	7	0	7	3	21	
Total	0 Titles	9/13						—

=== World Grand Prix ===
Champions Runners up Third place Fourth place

World Grand Prix record
Year	Round	Position	Pld	W	L	SW	SL	Squad
(Hong Kong) 1993	Did Not Enter							
(China) 1994	Preliminary round	11th Place	9	1	8	5	25	Squad
(China) 1995	Did Not Enter							
(China) 1996	Did Not Enter							
(Japan) 1997	Did Not Enter							
(Hong Kong) 1998	Did Not Enter							
(China) 1999	Did Not Enter							
(Philippines) 2000	Did Not Enter							
(Macau) 2001	Did Not Enter							
(Hong Kong) 2002	Did Not Enter							
(Italy) 2003	Did Not Enter							
(Italy) 2004	did not qualify							
(Japan) 2005	did not qualify							
(Italy) 2006	did not qualify							
(China) 2007	did not qualify							
(Japan) 2008	did not qualify							
(Japan) 2009	did not qualify							
(China) 2010	did not qualify							
(Macau) 2011	Preliminary round	16th Place	9	0	9	1	27	Squad
(China) 2012	did not qualify							
(Japan) 2013	did not qualify							
(Japan) 2014	Intercontinental round	18th Place	9	3	6	12	18	Squad
(United States) 2015	Final round	22nd Place	8	6	2	19	7	Squad
(Thailand) 2016	Final round	23rd Place	8	7	1	22	9	Squad
(China) 2017	Intercontinental round	21st Place	9	3	6	13	20	Squad
Total	0 Titles	6/25						—

=== Pan American Games ===
Champions Runners up Third place Fourth place

Pan American Games record
Year	Round	Position	Pld	W	L	SW	SL	Squad
(Mexico) 1955	Did Not Enter							
(United States) 1959		Third Place						Squad
(Brazil) 1963	Did Not Enter							
(Canada) 1967		Runners-Up						Squad
(Colombia) 1971	Round robin	Runners-Up	8	6	2	19	7	Squad
(Mexico) 1975		Runners-Up						Squad
(Puerto Rico) 1979		Runners-Up						Squad
(Venezuela) 1983		Third Place						Squad
(United States) 1987		Runners-Up						Squad
(Cuba) 1991		Third Place						Squad
(Argentina) 1995		5th Place						Squad
(Canada) 1999		6th Place						Squad

Pan American Games record
(Dominican Republic) 2003		7th Place	Squad
(Brazil) 2007	Semi Finals	4th Place	Squad
(Mexico) 2011		6th Place	Squad
(Canada) 2015		7th Place	Squad
(Peru) 2019		6th Place	Squad
Total	0 Titles	15/17	—

=== Pan American Cup ===
Champions Runners-up Third place Fourth place

Pan-American Cup record
Year	Round	Position	Pld	W	L	SW	SL	Squad
(Mexico) 2002	Did Not Enter							
(Mexico) 2003	Did Not Enter							
(Mexico) 2004	Did Not Enter							
(Dominican Republic) 2005	Did Not Enter							
(Puerto Rico) 2006	Quarter-finals	6th place						Squad
(Mexico) 2007	Round robin	7th place						Squad
(Mexico) 2008	Round robin	7th place						Squad
(United States) 2009	Quarter-finals	5th place						Squad
(Mexico) 2010	Final	Runners-up						Squad
(Mexico) 2011	Round robin	8th place						Squad
(Mexico) 2012	Quarter-finals	7th place						Squad
(Peru) 2013	Round robin	8th place						Squad

Pan-American Cup record
Year	Round	Position	Pld	W	L	SW	SL	Squad
(Mexico) 2014	Round robin	9th place						Squad
(Peru) 2015	Round robin	9th place						Squad
(Dominican Republic) 2016	Round robin	9th place						Squad
(Peru) 2017	Semi-finals	Fourth place						Squad
(Dominican Republic) 2018	Round robin	8th place						Squad
(Peru) 2019	Round robin	7th place						Squad
(Dominican Republic) 2021	Did Not Enter							
(Mexico) 2022	Round robin	7th place						Squad
Total	0 Titles	15/20						—

=== South American Championship ===
Champions Runners up Third place Fourth place

South American Championship record
Year	Round	Position	Pld	W	L	SW	SL	Squad
(Brazil) 1951								Squad
(Uruguay) 1956								Squad
(Brazil) 1958								Squad
(Peru) 1961								Squad
(Chile) 1962								Squad
(Argentina) 1964								Squad
(Brazil) 1967								Squad
(Venezuela) 1969								Squad
(Uruguay) 1971								Squad
(Colombia) 1973								Squad
(Paraguay) 1975								Squad
(Peru) 1977								Squad
(Argentina) 1979								Squad
(Brazil) 1981								Squad
(Brazil) 1983								Squad
(Venezuela) 1985								Squad
(Uruguay) 1987								Squad
(Brazil) 1989								Squad
(Brazil) 1991								Squad

South American Championship record
Year	Round	Position	Pld	W	L	SW	SL	Squad
(Peru) 1993								Squad
(Brazil) 1995								Squad
(Peru) 1997								Squad
(Venezuela) 1999								Squad
(Argentina) 2001	Did Not Enter							
(Colombia) 2003								Squad
(Bolivia) 2005								Squad
(Chile) 2007								Squad
(Brazil) 2009								Squad
(Peru) 2011								Squad
(Peru) 2013								Squad
(Colombia) 2015								Squad
(Colombia) 2017	Round-robin	Bronze	5	3	2	9	6	Squad
(Peru) 2019								Squad
(Colombia) 2021	Round-robin	4th	4	2	2	6	7	Squad
(Brazil) 2023	Round-robin	5th	4	0	4	4	12	Squad
Total	12 Titles	34/35						—

== Squads ==
=== Olympic Games ===
- Mexico 1968 — 4th place
  Olga Asato, Irma Cordero, Luisa Fuentes (c), Esperanza Jiménez, Teresa Nuñez, Ana María Ramírez, Aida Reyna, Alicia Sánchez, and Norma Velarde. Head Coach: Akira Kato.
- Montreal 1976 — 7th place
  Gaby Cárdeñas, Ana Cecilia Carrillo, Luisa Cervera (c), Irma Cordero, Delia Córdova, María del Risco, Luisa Fuentes, Mercedes Gonzáles, Luisa Merea, Teresa Núñez, María Ostolaza, and Silvia Quevedo. Head Coach: Park Man-bok.
- Moscow 1980 — 6th place
  Gaby Cárdeñas, Ana Cecilia Carrillo, Raquel Chumpitaz, María del Risco, Denisse Fajardo, Rosa García, Aurora Heredia, Silvia León, Natalia Malaga, Carmen Pimentel, Cecilia Tait (c) and Gina Torrealva. Head Coach: Park Man-bok.
- Los Angeles 1984 — 4th place
  Luisa Cervera, Ana Chaparro, María del Risco, Denisse Fajardo, Miriam Gallardo, Rosa García, Sonia Heredia, Natalia Málaga, Gabriela Pérez del Solar, Carmen Pimentel, Cecilia Tait (c), and Gina Torrealva. Head Coach: Park Man-bok.
- Seoul 1988 — Silver Medal
  Luisa Cervera, Alejandra de la Guerra, Denisse Fajardo, Miriam Gallardo, Rosa García, Sonia Heredia, Katherine Horny, Natalia Málaga, Gabriela Pérez del Solar, Cecilia Tait (c), Gina Torrealva, and Cenaida Uribe. Head Coach: Park Man-bok.
- Atlanta 1996 — 11th place
  Luren Baylon, Milagros Cámere (c), Leyla Chihuán, Verónica Contreras, Yolanda Delgado, Iris Falcón, Sara Joya, Sandra Rodriguez, Milagros Moy, Paola Ramos, Marjorie Vilchez, and Yulissa Zamudio. Head coach: Park Jong-duk.
- Sydney 2000 — 11th place
  Fiorella Aita, Milagros Cámere, Leyla Chihuán, Iris Falcón, Rosa García, Elena Keldibekova, Natalia Málaga, Milagros Moy, Patricia Soto (c), Jessenia Uceda, Janet Vasconzuelos, and Yulissa Zamudio. Head coach: Park Man-bok.

=== World Championships ===
- Brazil 1960 — 7th place
  Unknown
- Japan 1967 — 4th place
  Unknown
- Bulgaria 1970 — 15th place
  Unknown
- Mexico 1974 — 8th place
  Unknown
- URSS 1978 — 10th place
  Unknown
- Peru 1982 — Silver Medal
  Gaby Cárdeñas, Ana Cecilia Carrillo, Raquel Chumpitaz, María del Risco, Denisse Fajardo, Rosa García, Aurora Heredia, Silvia León, Natalia Málaga, Carmen Pimentel, Cecilia Tait, and Gina Torrealva.
- Czechoslovakia 1986 — Bronze Medal
  Sonia Ayaucán, Cenaida Uribe, Rosa Garcia, Miriam Gallardo, Gabriela Perez del Solar, Sonia Heredia, Cecilia Tait, Luisa Cervera, Denisse Fajardo, Ana Arostegui, Gina Torrealva, and Natalia Malaga.
- China 1990 — 6th place
  Sonia Ayaucán, Cenaida Uribe, Rosa Garcia, Miriam Gallardo, Gabriela Perez del Solar, Jessica Tejada, Milagros Cámere, Yolanda Delgado, Sammy Duarte, Paola Paz Soldan, Janet Vasconzuelos, and Natalia Malaga.
- Brazil 1994 — 13th place
  Luren Baylon, Verónica Contreras, Milagros Cámere, Iris Falcón, Miriam Gallardo, Rosa García, Sara Joya, Milagros Moy, Natalia Málaga, Sandra Rodriguez, Janet Vasconzuelos and Yulissa Zamudio
- Japan 1998 — 10th place
  Fiorella Aita, Luren Baylon, Milagros Cámere, Yvon Cancino, Elizabeth Castillo, Sahara Castillo, Leyla Chihuán, Iris Falcón, Roxana Huamán, Jessica Tejada, Patricia Soto and Yulissa Zamudio.
- Japan 2006 — 17th place
  Luren Baylon, Leyla Chihuán, Verónica Contreras, Sara Joya, Elena Keldibekova, Milagros Moy, Vanessa Palacios, Natalia Romanova, Patricia Soto, Carla Tristán, Mirtha Uribe and Yulissa Zamudio.
- Japan 2010 — 15th place
  Angélica Aquino, Leyla Chihuán, Paola García, Elena Keldibekova, Zoila La Rosa, Karla Ortiz, Vanessa Palacios, Carla Rueda, Patricia Soto, Jessenia Uceda, Mirtha Uribe and Yulissa Zamudio. Head coach: Cheol-Yeong Kim.

=== World Grand Prix ===
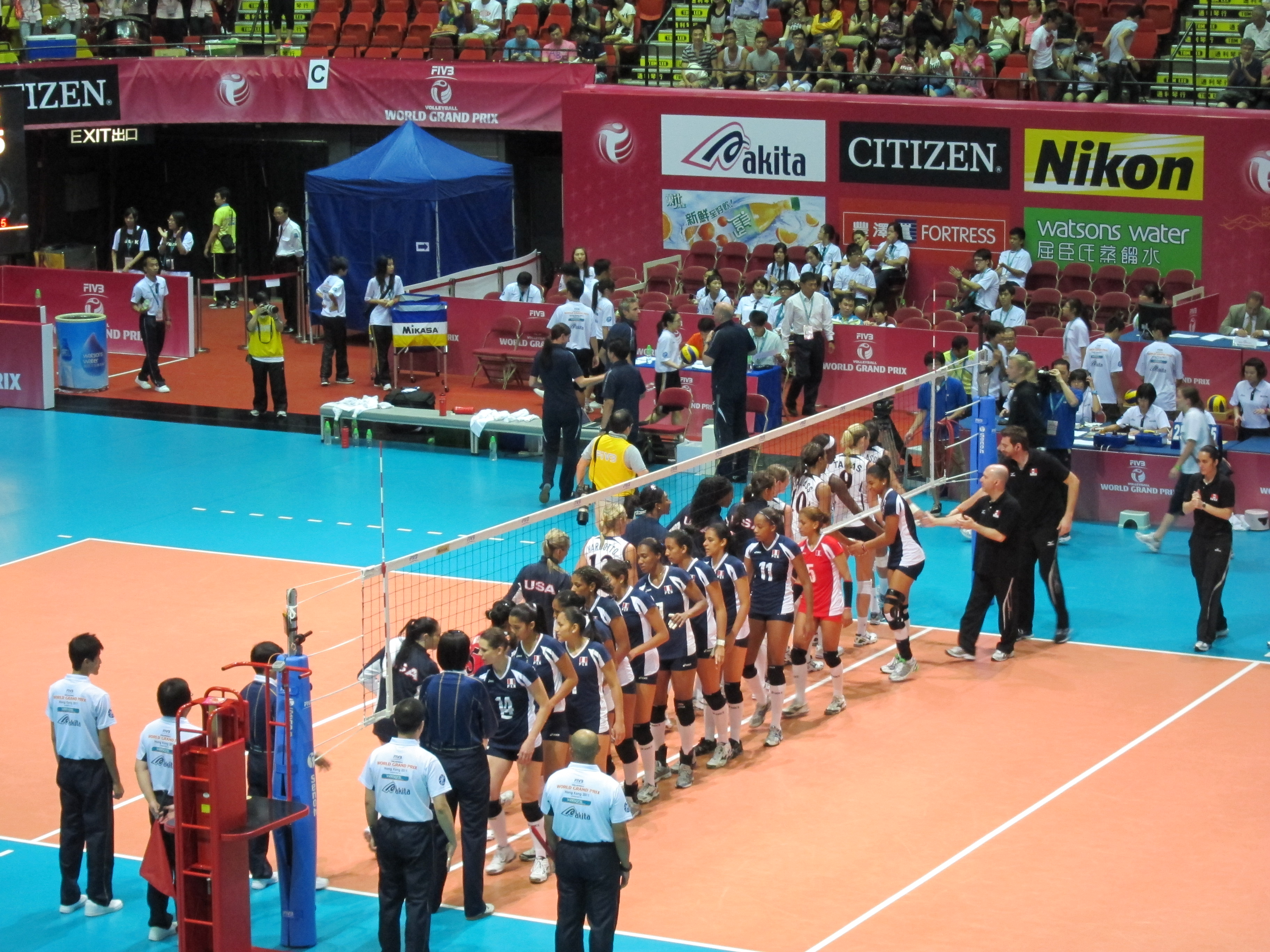
Peru has only qualified once to the World Grand Prix in 2011

- Shanghai 1994 — 11th place
  Unknown
- Macau 2011 — 16th place

- Angélica Aquino, Luren Baylon, Elena Keldibekova, Alexandra Muñoz, Karla Ortiz, Vanessa Palacios, Carla Rueda, Jessenia Uceda, Daniela Uribe, Mirtha Uribe, Clarivett Yllescas and Yulissa Zamudio. Head coach: Luca Cristofani.

=== Pan-American Cups ===
- Puerto Rico 2006 — 6th place
  Luren Baylón, Leyla Chihuán, Verónica Contreras, Teresa de la Borda, Gisela Duarte, Sara Joya, Elena Keldibekova, Vanessa Palacios, Natalia Romanova, Patricia Soto, Mirtha Uribe and Yulissa Zamudio. Head coach: Carlos Aparicio.
- Mexico 2007 — 7th place
  Luren Baylón, Leyla Chihuán, Verónica Contreras, Sara Joya, Elena Keldibekova, Vanessa Palacios, Pietra Schiappa, Patricia Soto, Carla Tristán, Jessenia Uceda, Mirtha Uribe and Yulissa Zamudio. Head coach: Enio de Figueiredo.
- Mexico 2008 — 7th place

- Yvon Cancino, Veronica Contreras, Kely Culquimboz, Sara Joya, Vanessa Palacios, Carla Rueda, Erika Salazar, Patricia Soto, Carla Tristán, Jessenia Uceda, Mirtha Uribe and Yulissa Zamudio. Head coach: José dos Santos.

- USA 2009 — 5th place

- Angélica Aquino, Leyla Chihuán, Paola García, Elena Keldibekova, Zoila La Rosa, Karla Ortiz, Vanessa Palacios, Carla Rueda, Patricia Soto, Jessenia Uceda, Mirtha Uribe and Yulissa Zamudio. Head coach: Cheol Yong Kim.

- Mexico 2010 — Silver Medal

- Angélica Aquino, Leyla Chihuán, Paola García, Elena Keldibekova, Zoila La Rosa, Karla Ortiz, Vanessa Palacios, Carla Rueda, Patricia Soto, Jessenia Uceda, Mirtha Uribe and Yulissa Zamudio. Head coach: Cheol Yong Kim.

- Mexico 2011 — 8th place

- Angélica Aquino, Luren Baylon, Paola García, Elena Keldibekova, Zoila La Rosa, Karla Ortiz, Vanessa Palacios, Carla Rueda, Patricia Soto, Mirtha Uribe and Yulissa Zamudio. Head coach: Luca Cristofani.

- Mexico 2012 — 7th Place

- Angélica Aquino, Raffaella Camet, Elena Keldibekova, Ángela Leyva, Ginna Lopez, Alexandra Muñoz, Karla Ortiz, Vanessa Palacios, Carla Rueda, Daniela Uribe, Mirtha Uribe and Clarivett Yllescas. Head coach: Edwin Jimenez.

- Peru 2013 — 8th Place

- María de Fátima Acosta, Angélica Aquino, Raffaella Camet, Grecia Herrada, Alexandra Muñoz, Zoila La Rosa, Karla Ortiz, Patricia Soto, Janice Torres, Mirtha Uribe, Clarivett Yllescas and Yulissa Zamudio. Head coach: Sung-Jin Hong.

=== South American Championships ===
- Porto Alegre 2009 — Bronze Medal

- Angélica Aquino, Raffaella Camet, Leyla Chihuan, Paola García, Elena Keldibekova, Zoila La Rosa, Karla Ortiz, Vanessa Palacios, Carla Rueda, Patricia Soto, Jessenia Uceda and Clarivett Yllescas. Head coach: Cheol-Yeong Kim.

- Lima 2011 — Bronze Medal

- Angélica Aquino, Luren Baylon, Elena Keldibekova, Alexandra Muñoz, Karla Ortiz, Vanessa Palacios, Carla Rueda, Patricia Soto, Jessenia Uceda, Mirtha Uribe, Clarivett Yllescas and Yulissa Zamudio. Head coach: Luca Cristofani.

- Ica 2013 — Bronze Medal

- María de Fátima Acosta, Angélica Aquino, Raffaella Camet, Grecia Herrada, Zoila La Rosa, Alexandra Muñoz, Karla Ortiz, Vanessa Palacios, Mirtha Uribe, Clarivett Yllescas and Yulissa Zamudio. Head coach: Luca Cristofani.

- Cartagena 2015 — Silver Medal

- Susan Egoavil, Angela Leyva, Katherine Regalado, Mabel Olemar, Maricarmen Guerrero, Alexandra Muñoz, Coraima Gomez, Esmeralda Sanchez, Mirtha Uribe, Clarivett Yllescas, Nair Canessa and Diana De la Peña. Head coach: Mauro Marasciulo.

== See also ==
- Peru women's national under-23 volleyball team
- Peru women's national under-20 volleyball team
- Peru women's national under-18 volleyball team
- Liga Nacional Superior de Voleibol
- Volleyball Copa Latina

== Videos ==
- CUBA Vs PERÚ COPA PANAMERICANA 2015 Partido Completo. Youtube.com video (in Spanish)
