= Raquel Chumpitaz =

Peruvian volleyball player

Raquel West

Personal information
- Full name: Raquel Elsa Chumpitaz (-Gáll-, -West)
- Nickname: La Chunga
- Born: 11 February 1962 (age 64); Lima, Peru
- Height: 1.74 m (5 ft 9 in)

Volleyball information
- Position: Setter / Middle blocker
- Number: 4

National team
1979–1982, 1991; 1983–1987	Peru; Hungary
Honours
Women's volleyball
Representing Peru
World Championship
Silver medal – second place	1982 Peru
Pan American Games
Silver medal – second place	1979 San Juan	Team
Bronze medal – third place	1991 Havana	Team
CSV South American Championship
Gold medal – first place	1979 Rosario
Silver medal – second place	1981 Santo André
Representing Hungary
European Championship
Bronze medal – third place	1983 East Germany

Raquel West (born 11 February 1962), previously known as Raquel Chumpitaz, is a Peruvian former volleyball player who competed in the 1980 Summer Olympics in Moscow. She was a member of the Peruvian team that won second place in the 1982 FIVB World Championship in Peru.

== Personal life ==
West is the club director and head coach at Spaceneedle Volleyball Foundation in Mukilteo, Washington.

West has a son named Matt West who played as a setter at Pepperdine University.
