= Denisse Fajardo =

Peruvian volleyball player

Personal information
- Full name: Denisse Fajardo García
- Born: 1 July 1964 (age 62); Lima, Peru
- Height: 1.71 m (5 ft 7 in)
- Weight: 62 kg (137 lb)

Volleyball information
- Position: Outside hitter
- Number: 9

National team
1980–1993	Peru
Medal record
Women's volleyball
Representing Peru
Olympic Games
Silver medal – second place	1988 Seoul	Team
World Championship
Silver medal – second place	1982 Peru
Bronze medal – third place	1986 Czechoslovakia	Team
Goodwill Games
Silver medal – second place	1986 Moscow
Pan American Games
Silver medal – second place	1987 Indianapolis	Team
Bronze medal – third place	1983 Caracas	Team
Bronze medal – third place	1991 Havana	Team
CSV South American Championship
Gold medal – first place	1983 São Paulo
Gold medal – first place	1985 Caracas
Gold medal – first place	1987 Punta del Este
Gold medal – first place	1989 Curitiba
Silver medal – second place	1981 Santo André
Silver medal – second place	1991 Sao Paulo

Denisse Fajardo García (born 1 July 1964), more commonly known as Denisse Fajardo, is a Peruvian former volleyball player and a three-time Olympian for her native country. Fajardo won the silver medal at the 1988 Olympic Games in Seoul, after playing the Soviet Union in the final. She also competed at the 1984 Olympic Games in Los Angeles, where Peru reached the semi-finals and lost to the United States, and finally finished in fourth place.

Fajardo was a member of the Peruvian team that won the silver medal at the 1982 FIVB World Championship in Peru and the bronze medal at the 1986 FIVB World Championship in Czechoslovakia.

== Club volleyball ==
Fajardo won the 1995 South American Club Championship gold medal playing with the Peruvian club Juventus Sipesa.
