= Silvia León =

Peruvian volleyball player

Personal information
- Full name: Silvia Margarita León Padilla
- Born: February 22, 1955 (age 71); Lima, Peru
- Height: 1.72 m (5 ft 8 in)

Volleyball information
- Number: 8

National team
| 1979–1982 | Peru |
Honours
Women's volleyball
Representing Peru
World Championship
| Silver medal – second place | 1982 Peru |
Pan American Games
| Silver medal – second place | 1979 Caguas | Team |

Silvia León (born 22 February 1958) is a Peruvian former volleyball player who competed in the 1980 Summer Olympics in Moscow. She was a member of the silver medal-winning Peruvian team at the 1979 Pan American Games in Caguas. She was also a member of the Peruvian team that won the silver medal in the 1982 FIVB World Championship in Peru.
