= Sonia Heredia =

Peruvian volleyball player

Personal information
- Full name: Sonia Isabel Heredia Condemarin
- Born: 23 November 1963 (age 62); Peru
- Height: 1.75 m (5 ft 9 in)

Volleyball information
- Position: Outside hitter
- Number: 4 (1984); 6 (1988)

National team
1979–1989	Peru
Medal record
Women's volleyball
Representing Peru
Olympic Games
Silver medal – second place	1988 Seoul	Team
World Championship
Bronze medal – third place	1986 Czechoslovakia	Team
Goodwill Games
Silver medal – second place	1986 Moscow
Pan American Games
Silver medal – second place	1979 Caguas	Team
Silver medal – second place	1987 Indianapolis	Team
Bronze medal – third place	1983 Caracas	Team
CSV South American Championship
Gold medal – first place	1985 Caracas
Gold medal – first place	1987 Punta del Este
Gold medal – first place	1989 Curitiba

Sonia Isabel Heredia Condemarin (born 23 November 1963), more commonly known as Sonia Heredia, is a Peruvian former volleyball player who played with the Peruvian women's national volleyball team. Heredia competed at the 1984 Summer Olympics in Los Angeles and won a silver medal at the 1988 Summer Olympics in Seoul. She won a bronze medal with the Peruvian team at the 1986 FIVB World Championship in Czechoslovakia.
