= Teresa Núñez (volleyball) =

Peruvian volleyball player (born 1951)

Teresa Núñez Laos

Personal information
- Full name: Teresa Núñez Laos
- Born: 20 March 1951 (age 75); Ica, Peru
- Height: 1.60 m (5 ft 3 in)

Volleyball information
- Number: 3

National team
1968–1981	Peru
Honours
Women's volleyball
Representing Peru
Pan American Games
Silver medal – second place	1971 Cali	Team
Silver medal – second place	1975 Mexico City	Team
CSV South American Championship
Gold medal – first place	1971 Montevideo
Gold medal – first place	1973 Bucaramanga
Gold medal – first place	1977 Lima
Silver medal – second place	1981 Santo André

Teresa Núñez Laos (born 20 March 1951) is a Peruvian former volleyball player and two-time Olympian. Nuñez competed with the Peruvian women's national volleyball team at the 1968 Summer Olympics in Mexico City and the 1976 Summer Olympics in Montreal. While representing Peru, she won silver medals at the 1971 Pan American Games in Cali and the 1975 Pan American Games in Mexico City.
