= Irma Cordero =

Peruvian volleyball player (1942–2019)

Personal information
- Full name: Irma Cordero Bonilla
- Born: 8 March 1942; Piura, Peru
- Died: 16 November 2019 (aged 77)
- Height: 1.68 m (5 ft 6 in)

Volleyball information
- Position: Outside hitter
- Number: 4

National team
1967–1977	Peru
Honours
Women's volleyball
Representing Peru
Pan American Games
Silver medal – second place	1967 Winnipeg	Team
Silver medal – second place	1971 Cali	Team
Silver medal – second place	1975 Mexico City	Team
CSV South American Championship
Gold medal – first place	1967 Santos
Gold medal – first place	1971 Montevideo
Gold medal – first place	1973 Bucaramanga
Gold medal – first place	1975 Asunción
Gold medal – first place	1977 Lima
Silver medal – second place	1969 Caracas

Irma Cordero (8 March 1942 – 16 November 2019) was a Peruvian volleyball player. Cordero competed at the 1968 Summer Olympics in Mexico City and the 1976 Summer Olympics in Montreal. She was the captain of the Peruvian team in the late 1960s and 1970s.

Cordero helped the Peruvian team win silver medals at the 1967, 1971, and 1975 Pan American Games.

Cordero died on 16 November 2019.
