= Elena Keldibekova =

Kazakhstani-Peruvian volleyball player

Personal information
- Full name: Elena Keldibekova
- Nickname: Patadita (Little kick, Kicker)
- Nationality: Kazakh / Peruvian
- Born: 23 June 1974 (age 52); Almaty, Kazakhstan (then USSR)
- Hometown: Lima, Peru
- Height: 1.77 m (5 ft 9 1/2 in)
- Weight: 72 kg (159 lb)
- Spike: 289 cm (114 in)
- Block: 280 cm (110 in)

Volleyball information
- Position: Setter

National team
2000–2012	Peru
Honours
Women's volleyball
Representing Peru
Pan-American Cup
Silver medal – second place	2010 Rosarito/Tijuana	National team
South American Championship
Silver medal – second place	2005 La Paz	National team
Silver medal – second place	2007 Santiago	National team
Bronze medal – third place	2003 Bogotá	National team
Bronze medal – third place	2009 Porto Alegre	National team
Bronze medal – third place	2011 Callao	National team
- Last updated: November 2017

Elena Keldibekova (born 23 June 1974) is a Kazakhstani-Peruvian retired volleyball player who played as setter for the Peru national team.

== Personal life ==
Keldibekova was born in Kazakhstan to a family of Russian origin. She moved to Peru when she was 19 years old to play one season for the Club Regatas volleyball club, but decided to stay in the country after the season was over. She is married to Johnny Westreicher, a Peruvian former volleyball player of German ancestry. The two met during her time at Club Regatas, as her then coach for the team. With Westreicher, Keldibekovava had a son named Jan.

Keldibekova is fluent in German, Russian and Spanish.

== Career ==
Keldibekova arrived to Peru and played the 1996/97 season with Regatas Lima. She was with the Peru National Team in the 2000 Summer Olympics in Sydney, Australia. Her team finished winless in tied 11th place.

In 2009, she claimed the Peruvian League Championship with her club Regatas Lima, after defeating Latino Amisa.

Keldibekova became famous because of her saving kick during the qualification tournament to the 2010 World Championship, when she saved a ball during the semifinals against Argentina.

Keldibekova won the Best Setter award and the silver medal in the 2010 Pan-American Cup. Later she won the silver medal, as well the Best Server and Best Setter awards at the 2010 Final Four Cup, held in Peru.

As part of the national team in Montreux, Switzerland at the 2011 Montreux Volley Masters, she won the Best Setter award, the team was in 7th place.

At the 2011 Pan-American Cup, Keldibekova was awarded with the Best Setter award, also finishing eighth with the national team

Patricia Soto, captain of Peru's national team, was injured previous to the 2011 World Grand Prix and the first round of the 2011 South American Championship. Keldibekova was the team captain for both tournaments. She played for the Italian team Time Volley Matera in 2012.

She decided to retire in 2013.

=== Coaching ===
Keldibekova returned to Regatas Lima to play the 2012–13 and 2013–14 seasons.

Keldibekova became the assistant coach of Regatas Lima' men's volleyball team that finished third in the 2013 season.

== Clubs ==
- (Peru) Regatas Lima (1996–2004)
- (Germany) TV Fischbek Hamburg (2004–2006)
- (Peru) Regatas Lima (2006–2010)
- (Azerbaijan) Lokomotiv Baku (2010–2011)
- (Italy) Time Volley Matera (2012)
- (Peru) Regatas Lima (2012–2013)
- (Peru) Circolo Sportivo Italiano (2018–2020)

== Awards ==
=== Individuals ===
- 2010 Pan-American Cup "Best Setter"
- 2010 Final Four Cup "Best Server"
- 2010 Final Four Cup "Best Setter"
- 2011 Montreux Volley Masters "Best Setter"
- 2011 Pan-American Cup "Best Setter"
- 2011 South American Championship "Best Setter"
- 2012 Pan-American Cup "Best Setter"

=== National team ===
==== Senior team ====
- 2005 Bolivarian Games - Gold Medal
- 2009 South American Championship - Bronze Medal
- 2010 Women's Pan-American Volleyball Cup - Silver Medal
- 2010 Final Four Women's Cup - Silver Medal
- 2011 South American Championship - Bronze Medal

=== Clubs ===
- 2008-09 Peruvian League - Champion, with Regatas Lima
- 2010-11 GM Capital Challenge Cup - Runner-up, with Lokomotiv Baku
