= Karla Ortiz =

Peruvian volleyball player

Personal information
- Full name: Karla Beatriz Ortiz Oyola
- Nationality: Peruvian
- Born: October 20, 1991 (age 35); Lima
- Hometown: Lima
- Height: 1.79 m (5 ft 10 in)
- Weight: 60 kg (132 lb)
- Spike: 300 cm (118 in)
- Block: 290 cm (114 in)

Volleyball information
- Position: Wing spiker
- Current club: Sporting Cristal
- Number: 15

National team
2009 -	Peru
Honours
Women's volleyball
Representing Peru
Pan-American Cup
Silver medal – second place	2010 Ciudad Juarez	National team
Bolivarian Games
Gold medal – first place	2013 Trujillo	National team
South American Championship
Bronze medal – third place	2009 Porto Alegre	National team
Bronze medal – third place	2011 Callao	National team
Bronze medal – third place	2013 Ica	National team
- Last updated: November 2013

Karla Beatriz Ortiz Oyola (born October 20, 1991, in Lima, Peru) is a Peruvian volleyball player who plays as Outside Hitter for the Peru national team. Playing volleyball, Ortiz has represented her country at the 2013 Bolivarian Games, the 2011 Pan American Games and the 2010 FIVB World Championship in Japan.

Ortiz played with Boston College in the 2012 season. She played with Haifa VC for the 2014-2015 Israeli League season, finishing as the Best Scorer and Best Spiker.

== Clubs ==
- (Peru) Divino Maestro (2007–2010)
- (Israel) Hapoël Névé Shaanan (2011–2012)
- (Chile) Boston College (2012)
- (Peru) Sporting Cristal (2012–2014)
- (Israel) Haifa VC (2014–2015)
- (Peru) Sporting Cristal (2014–2016)
- (Peru) Regatas Lima (2017–2021)

== Awards ==
=== Individuals ===
- 2013 South American Championship "Best outside hitter"
- 2014-15 Israeli League "Best scorer"
- 2014-15 Israeli League "Best spiker"

=== National team ===
- 2010 Pan-American Cup - Silver Medal
- 2009 South American Championship - Bronze Medal
- 2011 South American Championship - Bronze Medal
- 2013 South American Championship - Bronze Medal
- 2013 Bolivarian Games - Gold Medal

=== Clubs ===
- 2010-11 Liga Nacional Superior de Voleibol Femenino - Champion, with Divino Maestro
- 2011-12 Israeli Volleyball League - Bronze medal, with Hapoël Névé Shaanan
- 2012 Chilean League - Champion, with Boston College
- 2013 South American Club Championship - Bronze medal, with Boston College
- 2013 Chilean League - Bronze medal, with Boston College
- 2012-13 Liga Nacional Superior de Voleibol Femenino - Bronze medal, with Sporting Cristal
- 2013-14 Liga Nacional Superior de Voleibol Femenino - Runner-Up, with Sporting Cristal
