= Gabriela Cárdeñas =

Peruvian volleyball player (1958–2022)

María Cárdenas

Personal information
- Full name: María Cárdenas
- Nickname: Gaby
- Born: 5 January 1958; Lima, Peru
- Died: 4 October 2022 (aged 64)
- Height: 1.73 m (5 ft 8 in)

Volleyball information
- Number: 2

National team
1975–1982	Peru
Honours
Women's volleyball
Representing Peru
World Championship
Silver medal – second place	1982 Peru
Pan American Games
Silver medal – second place	1975 Mexico City	Team
CSV South American Championship
Gold medal – first place	1977 Lima

María "Gaby" Cárdenas (5 January 1958 – 4 October 2022) was a Peruvian volleyball player who competed in the 1976 and 1980 Summer Olympics. She was a member of the Peruvian team that won second place in the 1982 FIVB World Championship in Peru.

Cárdenas died on 4 October 2022.
