= Fiorella Aíta =

Peruvian volleyball player (born 1977)

Personal information
- Born: 13 July 1977 (age 47); Lima, Peru
- Height: 170 cm (5 ft 7 in)

Sport
- Sport: Volleyball

Fiorella Aíta Junek (born 13 July 1977) is a Peruvian volleyball player. She competed in the women's tournament at the 2000 Summer Olympics.
