= Sara Joya =

Peruvian volleyball player

Personal information
- Full name: Sara Inés Joya Lobaton
- Born: 22 February 1976 (age 50); Lima, Peru
- Height: 1.82 m (6 ft 0 in)
- Weight: 70 kg (154 lb)
- Spike: 298 cm (117 in)
- Block: 295 cm (116 in)

Volleyball information
- Position: Middle blocker
- Number: 1

National team
1993–2008	Peru
Medal record
Women's volleyball
Representing Peru
South American Championship
Gold medal – first place	1993 Cusco
Silver medal – second place	1995 Porto Alegre
Silver medal – second place	2007 Santiago

Sara Inés Joya Lobaton (born 22 February 1976), more commonly known as Sara Joya, is a Peruvian former volleyball player who played as a middle blocker. Joya represented her country at the 1996 Summer Olympics in Atlanta. She was a middle blocker.

== Career ==
Joya played in the 1996 Olympic Games, finishing in the eleventh place. She finished tenth in the 1999 FIVB World Cup and twentieth in the 2006 FIVB World Championship. She finished eleventh in the 2007 FIVB World Cup and seventh in both the 2007 Pan-American Cup and 2008 Pan-American Cup.
