= Luren Baylon =

Peruvian volleyball player (born 1977)

Personal information
- Nationality: Peruvian
- Born: 14 August 1977 (age 47)

Sport
- Sport: Volleyball

Luren Baylón Francis (born 14 August 1977) is a Peruvian volleyball player. She competed in the women's tournament at the 1996 Summer Olympics. She competed at the 1998 FIVB Volleyball Women's World Championship, 2006 FIVB Volleyball Women's World Championship, and 2011 FIVB World Grand Prix.
