= Luisa Fuentes =

Peruvian volleyball player (1948–2025)

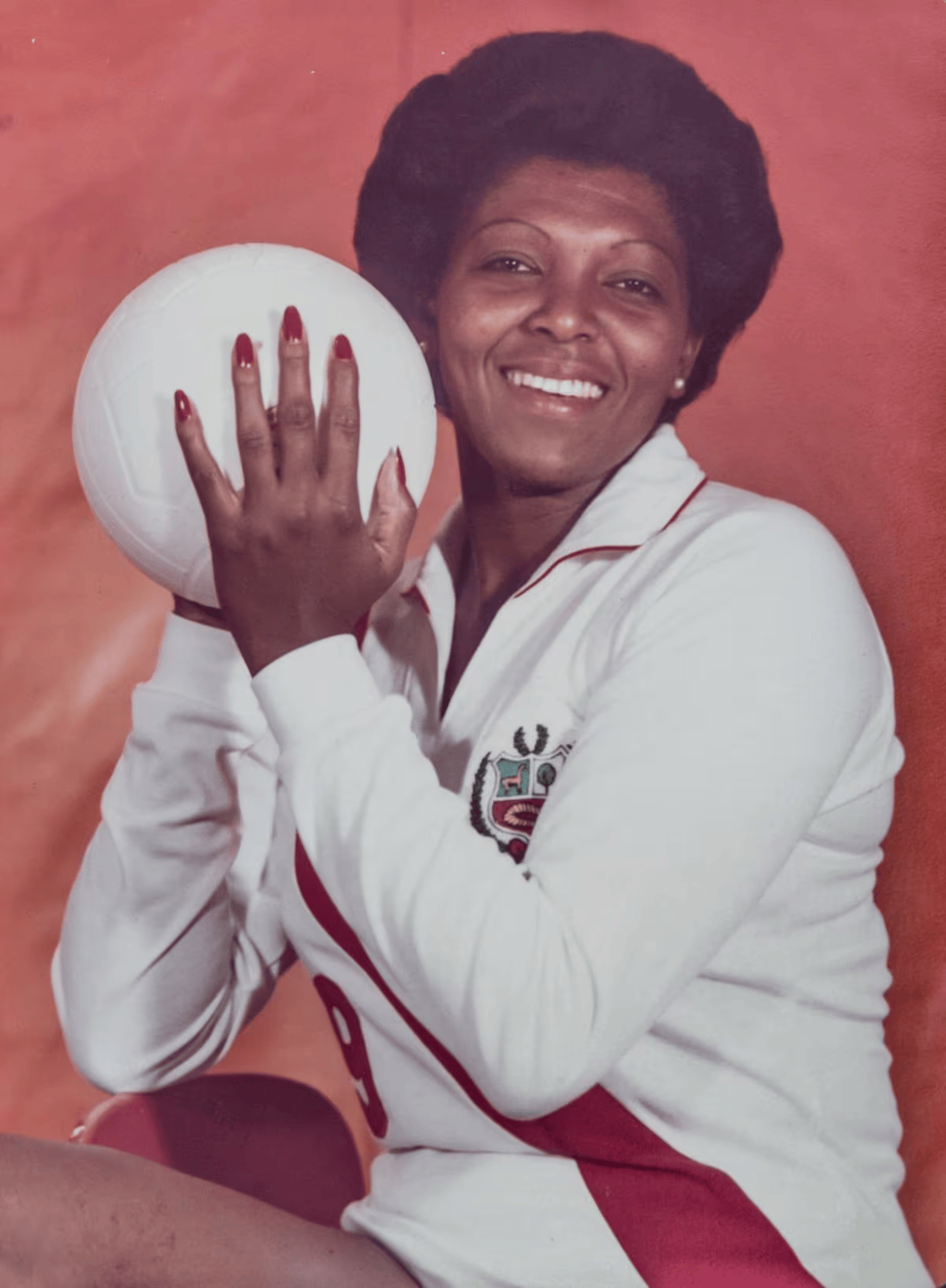
- Fuentes in 1979

Personal information
- Full name: Luisa Fuentes Quijandria
- Nickname: Lucha Fuentes; La Gran Capitana
- Born: 19 August 1948; Ica, Peru
- Died: 28 May 2025 (aged 76); Lima, Peru
- Height: 1.75 m (5 ft 9 in)
- Education: National University of San Marcos (physical education)

Volleyball information
- Number: 9

National team
1967–1979	Peru
Honours
Women's volleyball
Representing Peru
Pan American Games
Silver medal – second place	1967 Winnipeg	Team
Silver medal – second place	1971 Cali	Team
Silver medal – second place	1975 Mexico City	Team
Silver medal – second place	1979 Caguas	Team
CSV South American Championship
Gold medal – first place	1967 Santos
Gold medal – first place	1971 Montevideo
Gold medal – first place	1973 Bucaramanga
Gold medal – first place	1975 Asunción
Gold medal – first place	1977 Lima
Gold medal – first place	1979 Rosario
Silver medal – second place	1969 Caracas

Luisa Estela Fuentes Quijandría (19 August 1948 – 28 May 2025), more commonly known as Lucha Fuentes, was a Peruvian volleyball player who played with the national team in the 1968 and 1976 Summer Olympics. As the captain of the Peruvian team, she was nicknamed "La Gran Capitana" ("The Grand Captain").

== Biography ==
Luisa Fuentes was born on 19 August 1948 in Ica. Her father, Félix Fuentes, was a soccer player for iqueña Estela Quijandría. When she was 14 years old, she was discovered by Akira Kato, and began playing in Lima for the club Divino Maestro.

Fuentes won the silver medal in the 1967 Pan American Games and won the gold medal in the 1967 South American Championship, and finished fourth in the 1967 FIVB World Championship in Tokyo. She was fourth in the 1968 Summer Olympics in Mexico City. and a silver medalist in the 1969 South American Championship. She ranked fourteenth in the 1970 FIVB World Championship in Bulgaria.

Fuentes won the silver medal in the 1971 Pan American Games and gold in the 1971 South American Championship. She won gold in the 1973 South American Championship, and finished eighth in the 1974 FIVB World Championship in Mexico. She won the 1975 Pan American Games silver medal and gold in the 1975 South American Championship. She was seventh in the 1976 Summer Olympics in Montreal, and won gold in the 1977 South American Championship.

In the 1978 FIVB World Championship in the Soviet Union, Fuentes finished in tenth place. She won the silver medal in the 1979 Pan American Games, and finished her career with the gold medal in the 1979 South American Championship in Santa Fe.

Fuentes died in Lima on 28 May 2025, at the age of 76.

== Awards ==
In 2000, Fuentes was nominated by the International Volleyball Federation as the Best Player of the 20th century. Fuentes received the Laureles Deportivos ("Sports Laureate") award and was selected numerous times as Sportsperson of the Year.

== Teaching ==
Fuentes fought to popularize volleyball in Peru. She went on to become a teacher at the Sports Academy School of the Telefónica Foundation, where 300 girls and boys between 9 and 14 attended, but the school closed in 2015.
