= 1993 Women's South American Volleyball Championship =

2003 Women's South American Volleyball Championship
Tournament details
- Host country: Peru
- Dates: September 12–19
- Teams: 6
- Venue: Coliseo de la Juventud (in Cuzco host cities)

Final positions
- Champions: Peru (12th title)

Tournament awards
- MVP: Gaby Pérez (PER)

The 1993 Women's South American Volleyball Championship was the 20th edition of the Women's South American Volleyball Championship, organised by South America's governing volleyball body, the Confederación Sudamericana de Voleibol (CSV). It was held at Coliseo de la Juventud in Cuzco, Peru from September 12 to 19, 1993.

== Teams ==
Teams

Brazil
Chile
Colombia
Peru
Uruguay
Venezuela
Bolivia (withdrew)/ Peru 2^{[a]}

== Competition System ==
The competition system for the 1993 Women's South American Championship consisted of a Round-Robin system in which the top two teams in the ranking would play in the final match. On the first round each team plays once against each of the 5 remaining teams. Points are accumulated during the entire round, and the ranking is determined by the total points gained. Matches played against Peru's Junior team^{[a]} did not count towards the final ranking.

== First round ==
=== Standings ===
Team advanced to the finals

			Matches		Sets		
Rank	Team	Pts	W	L	W	L	Ratio
1	Peru	10	5	0	15	0	MAX
2	Brazil	9	4	1	12	3	4.000
3	Venezuela	8	3	2	9	6	1.500
4	Colombia	7	2	3	6	9	0.666
5	Chile	6	1	4	3	12	0.250
6	Uruguay	5	0	5	0	15	0.000

== Final Match ==
Date		Score		Set 1	Set 2	Set 3	Set 4	Set 5	Total
19 Sep	Peru	3–1	Brazil	16–14	5–15	15–1	15–10		59–32

== Final standing ==
Rank	Team
1st place, gold medalist(s)	Peru
2nd place, silver medalist(s)	Brazil
3rd place, bronze medalist(s)	Venezuela
4	Colombia
5	Chile
6	Uruguay

Qualified for the 1993 World Grand Champions Cup

1993 Women's South American Volleyball Championship

Peru
12th title

Team Roster:

Sonia Ayaucán, Milagros Cámere, Margarita Delgado, Miriam Gallardo, Rosa Garcia, Sara Joya, Natalia Málaga, Gabriela Perez del Solar and Janet Vasconsuelo

Head coach: Park Man-bok

== Individual awards ==
- Most valuable player
  - Gaby Pérez (PER)
- Best spiker
  - Sonia Ayaucan (PER)
- Best blocker
  - Ana Paula Connelly (BRA)
- Best server
  - Ana Paula Connelly (BRA)
- Best digger
  - Ana María Vieira (BRA)
- Best setter
  - Rosa García (PER)
- Best receiver
  - Natalia Málaga (PER)

== Notes ==
^{^[a]} Bolivia withdrew from the competition last minute, Peru's junior team was invited to play Bolivia's matches.
