= Ana Cecilia Carrillo =

Peruvian volleyball player

Personal information
- Full name: Ana Cecilia Carrillo Ruiz
- Nickname: Anace
- Born: 5 November 1955 (age 70); Peru
- Height: 1.74 m (5 ft 9 in)

Volleyball information
- Position: Opposite
- Number: 5

National team
1971–1982	Peru
Honours
Women's volleyball
Representing Peru
World Championship
Silver medal – second place	1982 Peru
Pan American Games
Silver medal – second place	1975 Mexico City	Team
Silver medal – second place	1979 Caguas	Team
CSV South American Championship
Gold medal – first place	1973 Bucaramanga
Gold medal – first place	1975 Asunción
Gold medal – first place	1979 Rosario
Silver medal – second place	1981 Santo André

Ana Cecilia Carrillo (born 5 November 1955) is a Peruvian former volleyball player who competed in the 1976 Summer Olympics in Montreal and the 1980 Summer Olympics in Moscow. She was a member of the Peruvian team that won second place in the 1982 FIVB World Championship in Peru.

Carrillo won silver medals with the Peruvian team in the 1975 and 1979 Pan American Games.
