= Cecilia del Risco =

Peruvian volleyball player

Personal information
- Full name: María Cecilia del Risco Arrieta
- Born: 23 August 1960 (age 66); Lima, Peru
- Height: 1.74 m (5 ft 9 in)

Volleyball information
- Position: Middle blocker
- Number: 6

National team
1976–1984	Peru
Honours
Women's volleyball
Representing Peru
World Championship
Silver medal – second place	1982 Peru
Pan American Games
Silver medal – second place	1979 San Juan	Team
Bronze medal – third place	1983 Caracas	Team
CSV South American Championship
Gold medal – first place	1979 Rosario

María Cecilia del Risco (born 23 August 1960) is a Peruvian former volleyball player who competed in the 1976 Summer Olympics, the 1980 Summer Olympics, and the 1984 Summer Olympics. She was a member of the Peruvian team that won second place in the 1982 FIVB World Championship in Peru.
