= María Ostolaza =

Peruvian volleyball player

Personal information
- Nationality: Peruvian
- Born: 26 February 1953 (age 73)
- Height: 1.63 m (5 ft 4 in)

Volleyball information
- Number: 12

National team
1971-1979	Peru
Honours
Women's volleyball
Representing Peru
Pan American Games
Silver medal – second place	1971 Cali	Team
Silver medal – second place	1975 Mexico	Team

María Ostolaza (born 26 February 1953) is a Peruvian volleyball player. She competed in the women's tournament at the 1976 Summer Olympics.
