= Luisa Merea =

Peruvian volleyball player

Personal information
- Nationality: Peruvian
- Born: 24 September 1958 (age 68)
- Height: 1.77 m (5 ft 10 in)

Volleyball information
- Number: 6

National team
1976	Peru

Luisa Merea (born 24 September 1958) is a Peruvian former volleyball player. Merea competed in the women's tournament at the 1976 Summer Olympics in Montreal, where she finished in seventh place.

== Personal life ==
Merea is the mother of Valeria Silva, a Peruvian former swimmer who competed internationally.
