= Silvia Quevedo =

Peruvian volleyball player

Personal information
- Nationality: Peruvian
- Born: 6 May 1959 (age 67)
- Height: 1.74 m (5 ft 9 in)

Volleyball information
- Number: 8

National team
1976	Peru

Silvia Quevedo (born 6 May 1959) is a Peruvian former volleyball player. Quevedo competed in the women's tournament at the 1976 Summer Olympics in Montreal, where she finished seventh.
