= Carla Rueda =

Peruvian volleyball player (born 1990)

Personal information
- Full name: Carla Rueda Cotito
- Nickname: Coto, Cotito
- Born: 19 April 1990 (age 36); Chincha, Peru
- Hometown: Lima, Peru
- Height: 1.80 m (5 ft 11 in)
- Weight: 70 kg (154 lb)
- Spike: 312 cm (123 in)
- Block: 300 cm (118 in)

Volleyball information
- Position: Wing Spiker
- Current club: AJM FC Porto
- Number: 3

National team
2006 -	Peru
Honours
Women's volleyball
Representing Peru
South American Championship
Silver medal – second place	2007 Santiago	National team
Bronze medal – third place	2009 Florianopolis	National team
Bronze medal – third place	2011 Callao	National team
Pan American Cup
Silver medal – second place	2010 Rosarito	National team
- Last updated: January 2016

Carla Rueda Cotito (born 19 April 1990 in Chincha, Peru) is a Peruvian volleyball player who plays for the Peru national team. Rueda represented her country at the 2006 and 2010 World Championships.

== Clubs ==
- (Peru) Sporting Cristal (2006)
- (Spain) Volley Murcia (2007)
- (Peru) Deportivo Géminis (2007–2008)
- (Portugal) Riberense (2008–2009)
- (Peru) Deportivo Géminis (2010–2011)
- (Trinidad and Tobago) Defense Force (2012)
- (Peru) Deportivo Géminis (2012–2014)
- (Azerbaijan) Azerrail Baku (2014–2015)
- (Italy) Golem Volley Palmi (2015–2016)
- (Peru) Deportivo Géminis (2016–2017)
- (France) ASPTT Mulhouse (2017–2018)
- (Peru) Deportivo Géminis (2018–2019)
- (Greece) Pannaxiakos V.C. (2019–2020)
- (Romania) Știința Bacău (2020)
- (Portugal) AJM/FC Porto (2021–2022)
- (Thailand) Diamond Food Volleyball Club (2022–2023)
