= Zoila La Rosa =

Peruvian volleyball player (born 1990)

Personal information
- Nationality: Peruvian
- Born: 31 May 1990 (age 36)
- Height: 1.75 m (5 ft 9 in)
- Weight: 57 kg (126 lb)
- Spike: 285 cm (112 in)
- Block: 280 cm (110 in)

Volleyball information
- Position: Setter

National team
- Years: Team
- –: Peru

Zoila La Rosa Cajo (born 31 May 1990) is a Peruvian female volleyball player. She was part of the Peru women's national volleyball team at the 2010 FIVB Volleyball Women's World Championship in Japan.

== Clubs ==
- (Peru) Divino Maestro (2010)
- (Peru) USMP (2011–2016)
- (France) Volley Club de Marcq-en-Baroeul Lille Métropole (2016–2020)
- (France) Municipal Olympique Mougins Volley Ball (2020–2021)
- (France) Volley Club de Marcq-en-Baroeul Lille Métropole (since 2021)
