= Vanessa Palacios =

Peruvian volleyball player

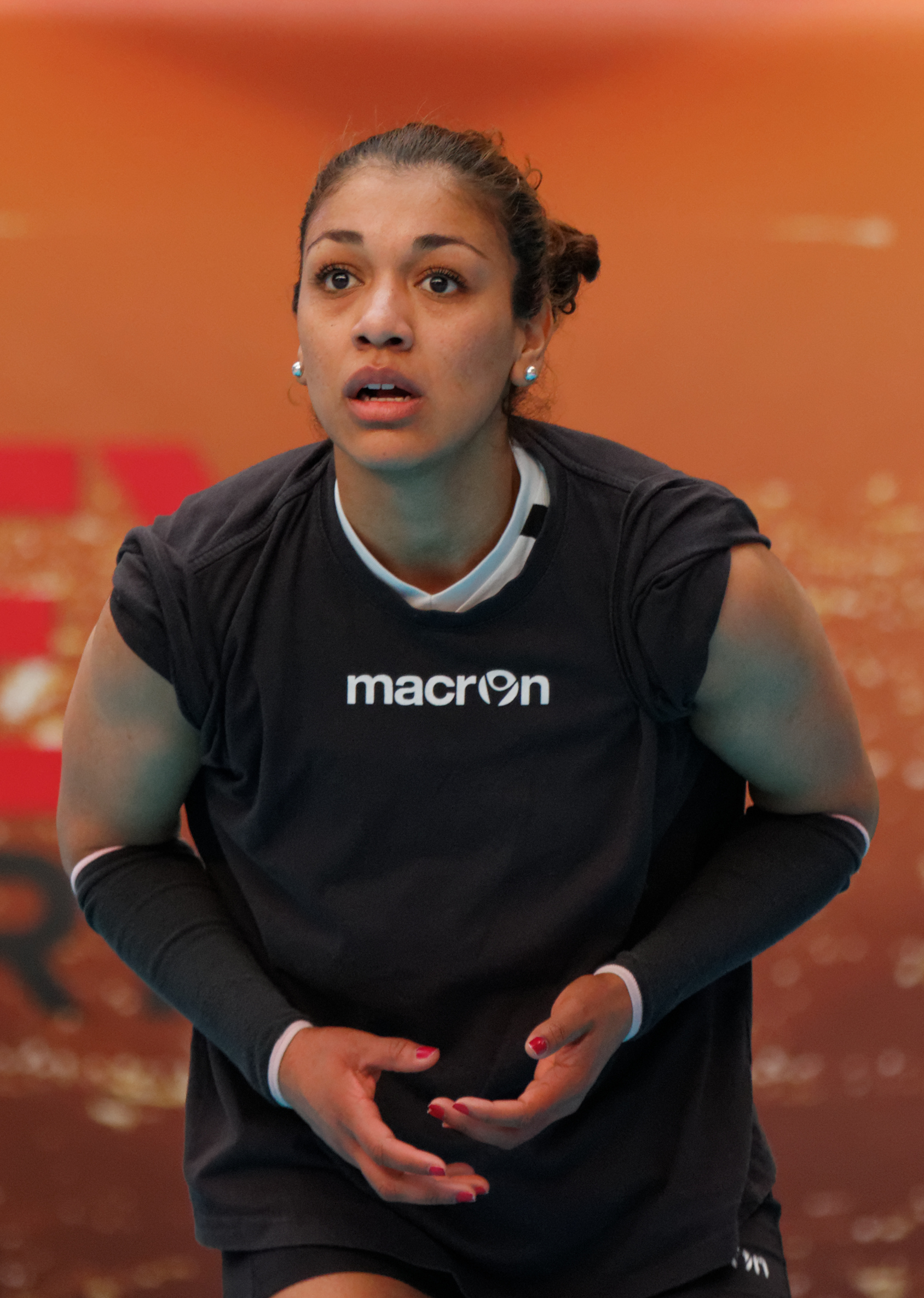
- French Cup 2013

Personal information
- Full name: Vanessa Magda Palacios Silva
- Nickname: Choco
- Born: July 3, 1984 (age 42) Lima, Peru
- Home town: Lima, Peru
- Height: 1.67 m (5 ft 5 1/2 in)
- Weight: 66 kg (146 lb)
- Spike: 275 cm (108 in)
- Block: 260 cm (100 in)

Volleyball information
- Position: Libero
- Current club: Vannes VB
- Number: 5

National team
- Years: Team
- 2005 -: Peru
Honours
Women's volleyball
Representing Peru
Pan-American Cup
Silver medal – second place	2010 Rosarito/Tijuana	National team
South American Championship
Silver medal – second place	2005 La Paz	National team
Silver medal – second place	2007 Santiago	National team
Bronze medal – third place	2009 Porto Alegre	National team
Bronze medal – third place	2011 Callao	National team
Final Four Cup
Silver medal – second place	2010 Chiapas	National team
- Updated on October 2011

Vanessa Magda Palacios Silva (born July 3, 1984, in Lima, Peru) is a Peruvian volleyball player who plays as Libero for the Peru women's national volleyball team.

== Career ==
Palacios was awarded Best Libero in the 2009/10 season from the Spanish Superliga .

== Clubs ==
- (Peru) Divino Maestro
- (Spain) CV Venidorm (2003–2008)
- (Spain) CV Sanse (2008–2009)
- (Spain) CV Tenerife (2009–2010)
- (Peru) Divino Maestro (2010–2011)
- (Spain) CV Tenerife (2011–2012)
- (France) Vannes VB (2012–2013)
- (Peru) CV Universidad César Vallejo (205–2016)
- (France) Istres Provence Volley (2016–2017)
- (France) Volley Club Marcq-en-Barœul (2017-)

== Awards ==
=== Individuals ===
- 2007 South American Championship "Best Digger"
- 2007 Pan-American Cup "Best Receiver"
- 2009 Pan-American Cup "Best Receiver"
- 2009 Pan-American Cup "Best Libero"
- 2009-2010 Spanish Superliga "Best Libero"
- 2010 Final Four Cup "Best Receiver"
- 2011 South American Championship "Best Receiver"
- 2011-12 Liga Nacional Superior de Voleibol "Best Libero"

=== National team ===
==== Senior team ====
- 2005 Bolivarian Games - Gold Medal
- 2009 South American Championship - Bronze Medal
- 2010 Women's Pan-American Volleyball Cup - Silver Medal
- 2010 Final Four Women's Cup - Silver Medal
- 2011 South American Championship - Bronze Medal
