= 2011 Women's South American Volleyball Championship =

Tournament details
- Host country: Peru
- Dates: September 28 - October 2
- Teams: 7
- Venue: 1 (in Callao host cities)

Final positions
- Champions: Brazil (17th title)

Tournament awards
- MVP: Sheilla Castro (BRA)

The 2011 Women's South American Volleyball Championship was the 29th edition of the Women's South American Volleyball Championship, organised by South America's governing volleyball body, the Confederación Sudamericana de Voleibol (CSV). It was held in Callao, Peru from September 28 to October 2, 2011.

== Competing nations ==
The following national teams have qualified:

| Pool A | Pool B |
|---|---|
| Colombia; Peru; Uruguay; Bolivia (withdrew) | Argentina; Brazil; Chile; Paraguay |

== First round ==
=== Pool A ===
| Pos | Team | Pld | W | L | Pts | SW | SL | SR | SPW | SPL | SPR | Qualification |
|---|---|---|---|---|---|---|---|---|---|---|---|---|
| 1 | Peru | 2 | 2 | 0 | 4 | 6 | 1 | 6.000 | 168 | 126 | 1.333 | Semifinals |
| 2 | Colombia | 2 | 1 | 1 | 3 | 4 | 3 | 1.333 | 162 | 138 | 1.174 | Semifinals |
| 3 | Uruguay | 2 | 0 | 2 | 2 | 0 | 6 | 0.000 | 84 | 150 | 0.560 | |

| Date | | Score | | Set 1 | Set 2 | Set 3 | Set 4 | Set 5 | Total |
|---|---|---|---|---|---|---|---|---|---|
| 28 Sep | Peru | 3–1 | Colombia | 25–23 | 25–22 | 18–25 | 25–17 | | 93–87 |
| 29 Sep | Peru | 3–0 | Uruguay | 25–13 | 25–13 | 25–13 | | | 75–39 |
| 30 Sep | Colombia | 3–0 | Uruguay | 25–13 | 25–10 | 25–22 | | | 75–45 |

=== Pool B ===
| Pos | Team | Pld | W | L | Pts | SW | SL | SR | SPW | SPL | SPR | Qualification |
|---|---|---|---|---|---|---|---|---|---|---|---|---|
| 1 | Brazil | 3 | 3 | 0 | 6 | 9 | 0 | MAX | 225 | 87 | 2.586 | Semifinals |
| 2 | Argentina | 3 | 2 | 1 | 5 | 6 | 3 | 2.000 | 187 | 145 | 1.290 | Semifinals |
| 3 | Chile | 3 | 1 | 2 | 4 | 3 | 6 | 0.500 | 141 | 219 | 0.644 | |
| 4 | Paraguay | 3 | 0 | 3 | 3 | 0 | 9 | 0.000 | 126 | 225 | 0.560 | |

| Date | | Score | | Set 1 | Set 2 | Set 3 | Set 4 | Set 5 | Total |
|---|---|---|---|---|---|---|---|---|---|
| 28 Sep | Argentina | 3–0 | Chile | 25–10 | 25–15 | 25–12 | | | 75–37 |
| 28 Sep | Brazil | 3–0 | Paraguay | 25–7 | 25–9 | 25–8 | | | 75–24 |
| 29 Sep | Argentina | 3–0 | Paraguay | 25–6 | 25–10 | 25–17 | | | 75–33 |
| 29 Sep | Brazil | 3–0 | Chile | 25–8 | 25–9 | 25–9 | | | 75–26 |
| 30 Sep | Chile | 3–0 | Paraguay | 26–24 | 25–20 | 27–25 | | | 78–69 |
| 30 Sep | Brazil | 3–0 | Argentina | 25–19 | 25–10 | 25–8 | | | 75–37 |

== Final round ==
=== Championship ===
Semifinals
2011-10-01 – Callao
Peru | 0
Argentina | 3
2011-10-01 – Callao
Brazil | 3
Colombia | 0

Final
2011-10-02 – Callao
Argentina | 0
Brazil | 3
Third place
2011-10-02 – Callao
Peru | 3
Colombia | 1

=== Semifinals ===
| Date | | Score | | Set 1 | Set 2 | Set 3 | Set 4 | Set 5 | Total |
|---|---|---|---|---|---|---|---|---|---|
| 1 Oct | Brazil | 3–0 | Colombia | 25–18 | 25–7 | 25–20 | | | 75–45 |
| 1 Oct | Peru | 0–3 | Argentina | 15–25 | 23–25 | 24–26 | | | 62–76 |

=== Classification 5–7 ===
| Date | | Score | | Set 1 | Set 2 | Set 3 | Set 4 | Set 5 | Total |
|---|---|---|---|---|---|---|---|---|---|
| 1 Oct | Uruguay | 3–0 | Paraguay | 25–6 | 25–14 | 25–13 | | | 75–33 |

=== Fifth place ===
| Date | | Score | | Set 1 | Set 2 | Set 3 | Set 4 | Set 5 | Total |
|---|---|---|---|---|---|---|---|---|---|
| 2 Oct | Uruguay | 3–1 | Chile | 25–16 | 24–26 | 25–18 | 25–19 | | 99–79 |

=== Third place ===
| Date | | Score | | Set 1 | Set 2 | Set 3 | Set 4 | Set 5 | Total |
|---|---|---|---|---|---|---|---|---|---|
| 2 Oct | Colombia | 1–3 | Peru | 23–25 | 22–25 | 25–23 | 22–25 | | 92–98 |

=== First place ===
| Date | | Score | | Set 1 | Set 2 | Set 3 | Set 4 | Set 5 | Total |
|---|---|---|---|---|---|---|---|---|---|
| 2 Oct | Brazil | 3–0 | Argentina | 25–10 | 25–7 | 25–17 | | | 75–34 |

== Final standing ==
| Rank | Team |
|---|---|
| 1st place, gold medalist(s) | Brazil |
| 2nd place, silver medalist(s) | Argentina |
| 3rd place, bronze medalist(s) | Peru |
| 4 | Colombia |
| 5 | Uruguay |
| 6 | Chile |
| 7 | Paraguay |

| Qualified for the 2011 World Cup |
| Qualified as Wild Card for the 2011 World Cup |

2011 Women's South American Volleyball Championship

Brazil
17th title

Team Roster:

Fabiana Claudino, Dani Lins, Adenizia da Silva, Thaisa Menezes, Marianne Steinbrecher, Jaqueline Carvalho, Sassá, Sheilla Castro, Fabíola de Sousa, Fernanda Garay, Tandara Caixeta, Fabiana de Oliveira (L),

Head Coach: Ze Roberto

== Awards ==
- Most valuable player
  - Sheilla Castro (BRA)
- Best scorer
  - Madelaynne Montaño (COL)
- Best spiker
  - Marianne Steinbrecher (BRA)
- Best blocker
  - Fabiana Claudino (BRA)
- Best server
  - Lorena Zuleta (COL)
- Best digger
  - Lucia Gaido (ARG)
- Best setter
  - Elena Keldibekova (PER)
- Best receiver
  - Vanessa Palacios (PER)
- Best libero
  - Fabi (BRA)
