= Diana Soto =

Peruvian volleyball player (born 1980)

Personal information
- Nationality: Peruvian
- Born: 10 February 1980 (age 46)
- Height: 1.79 cm (1 in)
- Weight: 67 kg (148 lb)
- Spike: 300 cm (118 in)
- Block: 295 cm (116 in)

Diana Patricia "Patty" Soto (born 10 February 1980) is a Peruvian volleyball player, and has captained the Peru women's national volleyball team.

She competed in the women's tournament at the 2000 Summer Olympics, 2010 FIVB Volleyball Women's World Championship, the 2011 Women's Pan-American Volleyball Cup, and the 2011 Montreux Volley Masters.
