= 1985 Women's South American Volleyball Championship =

The 1985 Women's South American Volleyball Championship was the 16th edition of the Women's South American Volleyball Championship, organised by South America's governing volleyball body, the Confederación Sudamericana de Voleibol (CSV). It was held in Caracas, Venezuela, from 25 July to 1 August.

== Final standing ==
Rank	Team
1st place, gold medalist(s)	Peru
2nd place, silver medalist(s)	Brazil
3rd place, bronze medalist(s)	Venezuela
4	Colombia

Qualified for the 1985 World Cup and 1986 World Championship
Qualified for the 1986 World B Championship

1985 Women's South American Volleyball Championship

Peru
9th title

Team Roster
Carmen Pimentel, Rosa Garcia, Rocio Malaga, Nancy Erquinigo, Sonia Heredia, Luisa Cervera, Denisse Fajardo, Aurora Heredia, Gina Torrealva, Natalia Malaga, Ines Zegarra, Gianina Finnetti
Head coach
Jorge Sato
