= 1997 Women's South American Volleyball Championship =

Tournament details
- Host country: Peru
- Teams: 9
- Venue: 1 (in Lima host cities)

Final positions
- Champions: Brazil (10th title)

The 1997 Women's South American Volleyball Championship was the 22nd edition of the Women's South American Volleyball Championship, organised by South America's governing volleyball body, the Confederación Sudamericana de Voleibol (CSV). It was held in Lima, Peru

== Final standing ==
Rank	Team
1st place, gold medalist(s)	Brazil
2nd place, silver medalist(s)	Peru
3rd place, bronze medalist(s)	Argentina
4	Venezuela
5	Chile
6	Colombia
7	Paraguay
8	Uruguay
9	Bolivia

1997 Women's South American Volleyball Championship

Brazil
10th title
