= 2014 FIVB Women's Club World Championship squads =

This article shows all participating team squads at the 2014 FIVB Women's Club World Championship squads, held from May 7 to 11, 2014 in Zürich, Switzerland.

== Pool A ==
=== SESI-SP ===
- Head Coach: (Brazil) Talmo de Oliveira

Number	Player
1	(Brazil) Fabiana Claudino (c)
3	(Brazil) Dani Lins
4	(Brazil) Suelle Oliveira
5	(Brazil) Alessandra Januário dos Santos
6	(Brazil) Bárbara Bruch
7	(Brazil) Priscila Daroit
8	(Brazil) Suelen Pinto (L)
10	(Brazil) Mariana Casemiro
11	(Brazil) Ivna Marra
12	(Brazil) Carolina Albuquerque
14	(Brazil) Dayse Figueiredo
20	(Brazil) Ana Beatriz Correa

=== GS Petroliers ===
- Head Coach: (Algeria) Salim Achouri

Number	Player
1	(Algeria) Salima Hammouche (L)
2	(Algeria) Lilya Djenaoui
3	(Algeria) Ahlam Amrani
4	(Algeria) Aicha Mezemate
5	(Algeria) Amel Khamtache
7	(Algeria) Zohra Bensalem
8	(Algeria) Sara Belhocine
9	(Algeria) Djouhar Allache
10	(Algeria) Fatma-Zohra Oukazi (c)
11	(Algeria) Malek Djari
12	(Algeria) Safia Boukhima
13	(Algeria) Yasmine Oudni

=== Voléro Zürich ===
- Head Coach: (Slovenia) Dragutin Baltić

Number	Player
2	(Brazil) Karine Guerra
3	(Serbia) Nađa Ninković
4	(Cuba) Kenia Carcaces Opón
5	(Ukraine) Yevgeniya Nyukhalova
7	(Ukraine) Olesia Rykhliuk
8	(Serbia) Silvija Popović (L)
11	(Bulgaria) Mira Todorova
12	(Serbia) Mira Golubović (c)
14	(Croatia) Karla Klarić
15	(United States) Courtney Thompson
16	(Switzerland) Inès Granvorka
17	(Switzerland) Laura Unternährer

== Pool B ==
=== Dinamo Kazan ===
- Head Coach: (Russia) Rishat Gilyazutdinov

Number	Player
1	(Russia) Maria Borodakova (c)
5	(Russia) Irina Malkova
8	(Russia) Daria Rossamakhina
9	(Russia) Maria Popova
10	(United States) Jordan Larson
11	(Russia) Ekaterina Gamova
13	(Russia) Evgeniya Startseva
14	(Russia) Ekaterina Ulanova (L)
15	(Italy) Antonella Del Core
16	(Russia) Anna Melnikova
17	(Russia) Regina Moroz
18	(Russia) Irina Voronkova

=== Hisamitsu Springs ===
- Head Coach: (Japan) Kumi Nakada

Number	Player
1	(Japan) Miyu Nagaoka
2	(Japan) Chizuru Kotō
3	(Japan) Risa Shinnabe
4	(Japan) Nana Iwasaka
5	(Japan) Yumi Mizuta
6	(Japan) Yuki Ishii
7	(Japan) Mihoko Tsutsui
8	(Japan) Rika Nomoto
9	(Japan) Kanako Hirai
11	(Japan) Maiko Kano
12	(Japan) Sayaka Tsutsui (L)
15	(Japan) Mizuho Ishida

=== Molico/Osasco ===
- Head Coach: (Brazil) Luizomar de Moura

Number	Player
1	(Serbia) Sanja Malagurski
4	(Brazil) Marjorie Correa
5	(Brazil) Adenízia da Silva
6	(Brazil) Thaísa Menezes
7	(Brazil) Talita Ferreira
8	(Brazil) Ana Maria Gosling
9	(Italy) Caterina Bosetti
10	(Brazil) Juliana Castro
12	(Brazil) Gabriella Souza
13	(Brazil) Sheilla Castro (c)
14	(Brazil) Fabiola de Sousa
18	(Brazil) Camila Brait (L)
