= 2013–14 CEV Women's Champions League =

- League: CEV Women's Champions League
- Sport: Volleyball

Finals
- Champions: (Russia) Dinamo Kazan
- Finals MVP: (Russia) Ekaterina Gamova

CEV Women's Champions League seasons
- ← 2012–13 2014–15 →

The CEV Champions League was the highest level of European club volleyball in the 2013–14 season and the 55th edition. It ran from 22 October 2013 until 16 March 2014.

Dinamo Kazan from Russia won the tournament and qualified for the 2014 FIVB Club World Championship after defeating VakıfBank İstanbul 3–0 in the final.

== Teams ==
The number of participants on the basis of ranking list for European Cup Competitions:

Rank	Country	Number of teams	Teams
1	Turkey	3	VakıfBank İstanbul; Eczacıbaşı VitrA Istanbul; Galatasaray Daikin İstanbul
2	Russia	3	Dinamo Kazan; Dinamo Moscow; Omichka Omsk Region
3	Italy	3	RebecchiNMeccanica Piacenza; Prosecco Doc-Imoco Conegliano; Unendo Yamamay Busto Arsizio (WC)
4	France	2	RC Cannes; Béziers Volley
5	Poland	2	Atom Trefl Sopot; Tauron MKS Dąbrowa Górnicza
6	Azerbaijan	3	Rabita Baku; Baki-Azeryol; Igtisadchi Baku (WC)
7	Romania	2	Ştiinţa Bacău; Dinamo Romprest București
8	Serbia	1	Crvena Zvezda Beograd
9	Germany	2	Schweriner SC; Dresdner SC (WC)
10	Switzerland	1	Voléro Zürich
11	Czech Republic	1	Agel Prostějov
12	Belgium	1	Gent Dames

== League round ==
24 teams were drawn to 6 pools of 4 teams each.
The 1st and 2nd ranked qualified for the Playoff 12
The organizer of the Final Four were determined after the end of the League Round and qualified directly for the Final Four.
The team of the organizer of the Final Four was replaced by the best 3rd ranked team with the best score.
The remaining 3rd placed and all 4th placed teams were eliminated.

=== Pool A ===
Pos	Team	Pld	W	L	Pts	SW	SL	SR	SPW	SPL	SPR
1	(Azerbaijan) Rabita Baku	6	6	0	16	18	5	3.600	540	444	1.216
2	(Russia) Omichka Omsk Region	6	4	2	14	16	7	2.286	522	449	1.163
3	(Germany) Dresdner SC	6	2	4	6	7	13	0.538	414	462	0.896
4	(France) Béziers Volley	6	0	6	0	2	18	0.111	377	498	0.757

Date	Time		Score		Set 1	Set 2	Set 3	Set 4	Set 5	Total	Report
23 Oct	19:00	Dresdner SC (Germany)	3–1	(France) Béziers Volley	22–25	25–22	25–18	25–21		97–86	Report
24 Oct	17:00	Rabita Baku (Azerbaijan)	3–2	(Russia) Omichka Omsk Region	25–16	20–25	25–19	23–25	15–13	108–98	Report
29 Oct	20:30	Béziers Volley (France)	0–3	(Azerbaijan) Rabita Baku	23–25	20–25	16–25			59–75	Report
31 Oct	19:00	Omichka Omsk Region (Russia)	3–0	(Germany) Dresdner SC	25–21	25–16	25–17			75–54	Report
26 Nov	20:30	Béziers Volley (France)	0–3	(Russia) Omichka Omsk Region	16–25	22–25	24–26			62–76	Report
27 Nov	19:00	Dresdner SC (Germany)	0–3	(Azerbaijan) Rabita Baku	19–25	23–25	20–25			62–75	Report
4 Dec	19:00	Omichka Omsk Region (Russia)	3–0	(France) Béziers Volley	25–9	25–14	25–17			75–40	Report
5 Dec	17:00	Rabita Baku (Azerbaijan)	3–0	(Germany) Dresdner SC	25–14	25–15	25–19			75–48	Report
11 Dec	17:00	Rabita Baku (Azerbaijan)	3–1	(France) Béziers Volley	25–15	23–25	25–10	27–25		100–75	Report
11 Dec	19:00	Dresdner SC (Germany)	1–3	(Russia) Omichka Omsk Region	25–21	15–25	20–25	18–25		78–96	Report
17 Dec	19:00	Omichka Omsk Region (Russia)	2–3	(Azerbaijan) Rabita Baku	19–25	22–25	25–23	25–19	11–15	102–107	Report
17 Dec	19:00	Béziers Volley (France)	0–3	(Germany) Dresdner SC	17–25	18–25	20–25			55–75	Report

=== Pool B ===
Pos	Team	Pld	W	L	Pts	SW	SL	SR	SPW	SPL	SPR
1	(Italy) RebecchiNMeccanica Piacenza	6	5	1	15	16	6	2.667	526	451	1.166
2	(Russia) Dinamo Moscow	6	4	2	13	15	9	1.667	565	496	1.139
3	(Azerbaijan) Igtisadchi Baku	6	3	3	8	10	12	0.833	482	475	1.015
4	(Serbia) Crvena Zvezda Beograd	6	0	6	0	4	18	0.222	393	544	0.722

Date	Time		Score		Set 1	Set 2	Set 3	Set 4	Set 5	Total	Report
22 Oct	19:00	Dinamo Moscow (Russia)	3–1	(Italy) Nordmeccanica Piacenza	25–21	25–27	25–23	25–19		100–90	Report
22 Oct	18:00	Crvena Zvezda Beograd (Serbia)	0–3	(Azerbaijan) Igtisadchi Baku	15–25	16–25	23–25			54–75	Report
29 Oct	18:00	Igtisadchi Baku (Azerbaijan)	3–2	(Russia) Dinamo Moscow	23–25	25–21	19–25	25–23	15–13	107–107	Report
31 Oct	20:30	Nordmeccanica Piacenza (Italy)	3–0	(Serbia) Crvena Zvezda Beograd	25–18	25–18	25–11			75–47	Report
26 Nov	18:00	Crvena Zvezda Beograd (Serbia)	1–3	(Russia) Dinamo Moscow	26–24	20–25	16–25	18–25		80–99	Report
27 Nov	18:00	Igtisadchi Baku (Azerbaijan)	1–3	(Italy) Nordmeccanica Piacenza	16–25	18–25	25–21	20–25		79–96	Report
4 Dec	19:00	Dinamo Moscow (Russia)	3–1	(Serbia) Crvena Zvezda Beograd	25–14	25–13	22–25	25–16		97–68	Report
5 Dec	20:30	Nordmeccanica Piacenza (Italy)	3–0	(Azerbaijan) Igtisadchi Baku	25–17	25–20	26–24			76–61	Report
10 Dec	19:00	Dinamo Moscow (Russia)	3–0	(Azerbaijan) Igtisadchi Baku	25–23	25–17	25–18			75–58	Report
10 Dec	18:00	Crvena Zvezda Beograd (Serbia)	1–3	(Italy) Nordmeccanica Piacenza	18–25	25–21	19–25	15–25		77–96	Report
17 Dec	18:00	Igtisadchi Baku (Azerbaijan)	3–1	(Serbia) Crvena Zvezda Beograd	27–29	25–13	25–13	25–12		102–67	Report
17 Dec	20:30	Nordmeccanica Piacenza (Italy)	3–1	(Russia) Dinamo Moscow	25–21	25–23	18–25	25–18		93–87	Report

=== Pool C ===
Pos	Team	Pld	W	L	Pts	SW	SL	SR	SPW	SPL	SPR
1	(Turkey) VakıfBank İstanbul	6	6	0	18	18	1	18.000	469	339	1.383
2	(Poland) Atom Trefl Sopot	6	4	2	12	13	8	1.625	473	438	1.080
3	(Romania) Dinamo Romprest București	6	2	4	6	8	12	0.667	414	444	0.932
4	(Belgium) Gent Dames	6	0	6	0	0	18	0.000	315	450	0.700

Date	Time		Score		Set 1	Set 2	Set 3	Set 4	Set 5	Total	Report
23 Oct	19:00	Dinamo Romprest București (Romania)	1–3	(Poland) Atom Trefl Sopot	25–20	17–25	17–25	23–25		82–95	Report
23 Oct	20:30	Gent Dames (Belgium)	0–3	(Turkey) VakıfBank İstanbul	15–25	22–25	21–25			58–75	Report
29 Oct	20:30	Atom Trefl Sopot (Poland)	3–0	(Belgium) Gent Dames	25–9	25–20	25–17			75–46	Report
31 Oct	19:00	VakıfBank İstanbul (Turkey)	3–0	(Romania) Dinamo Romprest București	25–20	25–7	25–11			75–38	Report
26 Nov	19:00	Atom Trefl Sopot (Poland)	1–3	(Turkey) VakıfBank İstanbul	25–19	14–25	19–25	18–25		76–94	Report
27 Nov	19:00	Dinamo Romprest București (Romania)	3–0	(Belgium) Gent Dames	25–20	25–17	25–15			75–52	Report
4 Dec	19:00	VakıfBank İstanbul (Turkey)	3–0	(Poland) Atom Trefl Sopot	25–22	25–20	25–12			75–54	Report
4 Dec	20:30	Gent Dames (Belgium)	0–3	(Romania) Dinamo Romprest București	17–25	12–25	20–25			49–75	Report
11 Dec	19:00	Dinamo Romprest București (Romania)	0–3	(Turkey) VakıfBank İstanbul	23–25	21–25	17–25			61–75	Report
11 Dec	20:30	Gent Dames (Belgium)	0–3	(Poland) Atom Trefl Sopot	23–25	14–25	21–25			58–75	Report
17 Dec	17:30	VakıfBank İstanbul (Turkey)	3–0	(Belgium) Gent Dames	25–13	25–20	25–19			75–52	Report
17 Dec	20:30	Atom Trefl Sopot (Poland)	3–1	(Romania) Dinamo Romprest București	23–25	25–17	25–21	25–20		98–83	Report

=== Pool D ===
Pos	Team	Pld	W	L	Pts	SW	SL	SR	SPW	SPL	SPR
1	(Turkey) Eczacıbaşı VitrA Istanbul	6	6	0	18	18	1	18.000	471	379	1.243
2	(France) RC Cannes	6	4	2	12	12	6	2.000	427	371	1.151
3	(Czech Republic) Agel Prostějov	6	2	4	6	7	14	0.500	458	464	0.987
4	(Germany) Schweriner SC	6	0	6	0	2	18	0.111	351	493	0.712

Date	Time		Score		Set 1	Set 2	Set 3	Set 4	Set 5	Total	Report
22 Oct	20:00	RC Cannes (France)	3–0	(Germany) Schweriner SC	25–17	25–15	25–16			75–48	Report
24 Oct	17:00	Eczacıbaşı VitrA Istanbul (Turkey)	3–0	(Czech Republic) Agel Prostějov	25–15	25–14	25–21			75–50	Report
30 Oct	18:00	Agel Prostějov (Czech Republic)	0–3	(France) RC Cannes	18–25	22–25	23–25			63–75	Report
30 Oct	19:00	Schweriner SC (Germany)	0–3	(Turkey) Eczacıbaşı VitrA Istanbul	21–25	18–25	23–25			62–75	Report
26 Nov	18:00	Agel Prostějov (Czech Republic)	3–1	(Germany) Schweriner SC	25–17	23–25	25–17	25–17		98–76	Report
28 Nov	17:00	Eczacıbaşı VitrA Istanbul (Turkey)	3–0	(France) RC Cannes	26–24	25–21	25–23			76–68	Report
4 Dec	19:00	Schweriner SC (Germany)	1–3	(Czech Republic) Agel Prostějov	25–20	9–25	16–25	18–25		68–95	Report
5 Dec	20:00	RC Cannes (France)	0–3	(Turkey) Eczacıbaşı VitrA Istanbul	18–25	21–25	20–25			59–75	Report
11 Dec	17:00	Eczacıbaşı VitrA Istanbul (Turkey)	3–0	(Germany) Schweriner SC	25–15	25–17	25–15			75–47	Report
12 Dec	20:00	RC Cannes (France)	3–0	(Czech Republic) Agel Prostějov	25–23	25–16	25–20			75–59	Report
17 Dec	18:00	Agel Prostějov (Czech Republic)	1–3	(Turkey) Eczacıbaşı VitrA Istanbul	25–17	26–28	19–25	23–25		93–95	Report
17 Dec	19:00	Schweriner SC (Germany)	0–3	(France) RC Cannes	14–25	16–25	20–25			50–75	Report

=== Pool E ===
Pos	Team	Pld	W	L	Pts	SW	SL	SR	SPW	SPL	SPR
1	(Turkey) Galatasaray Daikin İstanbul	6	5	1	14	17	8	2.125	585	515	1.136
2	(Italy) Prosecco Doc-Imoco Conegliano	6	4	2	11	15	11	1.364	579	559	1.036
3	(Azerbaijan) Baki-Azeryol	6	2	4	8	11	15	0.733	551	594	0.928
4	(Italy) Unendo Yamamay Busto Arsizio	6	1	5	4	6	15	0.400	433	480	0.902

Date	Time		Score		Set 1	Set 2	Set 3	Set 4	Set 5	Total	Report
22 Oct	18:00	Baki-Azeryol (Azerbaijan)	3–2	(Italy) Yamamay Busto Arsizio	24–26	25–20	25–15	17–25	15–13	106–99	Report
23 Oct	20:30	Doc-Imoco Conegliano (Italy)	3–2	(Turkey) Galatasaray İstanbul	25–23	25–23	19–25	21–20	18–16	108–107	Report
29 Oct	20:30	Yamamay Busto Arsizio (Italy)	1–3	(Italy) Doc-Imoco Conegliano	13–25	22–25	25–22	17–25		77–97	Report
30 Oct	20:30	Galatasaray İstanbul (Turkey)	3–1	(Azerbaijan) Baki-Azeryol	25–23	25–21	27–29	25–22		102–95	Report
27 Nov	18:30	Galatasaray İstanbul (Turkey)	3–0	(Italy) Yamamay Busto Arsizio	26–24	25–23	25–11			76–58	Report
28 Nov	20:30	Doc-Imoco Conegliano (Italy)	3–2	(Azerbaijan) Baki-Azeryol	23–25	25–19	22–25	25–15	15–10	110–94	Report
3 Dec	18:00	Baki-Azeryol (Azerbaijan)	3–1	(Italy) Doc-Imoco Conegliano	25–23	30–32	25–22	25–23		105–100	Report
3 Dec	20:30	Yamamay Busto Arsizio (Italy)	0–3	(Turkey) Galatasaray İstanbul	22–25	20–25	23–25			65–75	Report
10 Dec	18:00	Baki-Azeryol (Azerbaijan)	2–3	(Turkey) Galatasaray İstanbul	25–21	22–25	25–21	15–25	14–16	101–108	Report
11 Dec	20:30	Doc-Imoco Conegliano (Italy)	3–0	(Italy) Yamamay Busto Arsizio	25–20	25–15	26–24			76–59	Report
17 Dec	20:30	Galatasaray İstanbul (Turkey)	3–2	(Italy) Doc-Imoco Conegliano	24–26	23–25	25–19	25–15	15–3	112–88	Report
17 Dec	20:30	Yamamay Busto Arsizio (Italy)	3–0	(Azerbaijan) Baki-Azeryol	25–14	25–17	25–19			75–50	Report

=== Pool F ===
Pos	Team	Pld	W	L	Pts	SW	SL	SR	SPW	SPL	SPR
1	(Russia) Dinamo Kazan	6	5	1	16	17	4	4.250	507	399	1.271
2	(Switzerland) Voléro Zürich	6	4	2	11	14	12	1.167	575	541	1.063
3	(Romania) Ştiinţa Bacău	6	2	4	5	7	15	0.467	429	527	0.814
4	(Poland) Tauron MKS Dąbrowa Górnicza	6	1	5	4	8	15	0.533	489	533	0.917

Date	Time		Score		Set 1	Set 2	Set 3	Set 4	Set 5	Total	Report
23 Oct	20:30	MKS Dąbrowa Górnicza (Poland)	3–0	(Romania) Ştiinţa Bacău	25–21	25–15	25–18			75–54	Report
24 Oct	20:00	Voléro Zürich (Switzerland)	0–3	(Russia) Dinamo Kazan	18–25	12–25	18–25			48–75	Report
29 Oct	17:00	Ştiinţa Bacău (Romania)	3–2	(Switzerland) Voléro Zürich	17–25	27–25	25–20	8–25	15–13	92–108	Report
31 Oct	19:00	Dinamo Kazan (Russia)	3–1	(Poland) MKS Dąbrowa Górnicza	29–27	22–25	25–15	25–13		101–80	Report
26 Nov	19:00	Dinamo Kazan (Russia)	3–0	(Romania) Ştiinţa Bacău	25–16	25–18	25–16			75–50	Report
28 Nov	20:00	Voléro Zürich (Switzerland)	3–1	(Poland) MKS Dąbrowa Górnicza	25–12	16–25	25–15	25–18		91–70	Report
4 Dec	19:00	MKS Dąbrowa Górnicza (Poland)	2–3	(Switzerland) Voléro Zürich	26–28	25–21	23–25	25–22	9–15	108–111	Report
5 Dec	17:00	Ştiinţa Bacău (Romania)	0–3	(Russia) Dinamo Kazan	15–25	17–25	10–25			42–75	Report
11 Dec	19:00	MKS Dąbrowa Górnicza (Poland)	0–3	(Russia) Dinamo Kazan	22–25	21–25	20–25			63–75	Report
12 Dec	20:00	Voléro Zürich (Switzerland)	3–1	(Romania) Ştiinţa Bacău	25–16	25–23	26–28	25–23		101–90	Report
17 Dec	17:00	Ştiinţa Bacău (Romania)	3–1	(Poland) MKS Dąbrowa Górnicza	20–25	31–29	25–16	25–23		101–93	Report
17 Dec	19:00	Dinamo Kazan (Russia)	2–3	(Switzerland) Voléro Zürich	25–23	25–23	20–25	28–30	8–15	106–116	Report

== Playoffs ==
Group	Winners	Runners-up
A	(Azerbaijan) Rabita Baku	(Russia) Omichka Omsk Region
B	(Italy) RebecchiNMeccanica Piacenza	(Russia) Dinamo Moscow
C	(Turkey) VakıfBank İstanbul	(Poland) Atom Trefl Sopot
D	(Turkey) Eczacıbaşı VitrA Istanbul	(France) RC Cannes
E	(Turkey) Galatasaray Daikin İstanbul	(Italy) Prosecco Doc-Imoco Conegliano
F	(Russia) Dinamo Kazan	(Switzerland) Voléro Zürich
Best third ranked		(Azerbaijan) Igtisadchi Baku

=== Playoffs 12 ===
Team 1	Agg.	Team 2	1st leg	2nd leg
Prosecco Doc-Imoco Conegliano (Italy)	3–3^{1}	(Russia) Omichka Omsk Region	3–0	0–3
Atom Trefl Sopot (Poland)	0–6	(Turkey) Eczacıbaşı VitrA Istanbul	0–3	1–3
RC Cannes (France)	6–0	(Turkey) Galatasaray Daikin İstanbul	3–1	3–0
Igtisadchi Baku (Azerbaijan)	0–6	(Turkey) VakıfBank İstanbul	0–3	0–3
Dinamo Moscow (Russia)	0–6	(Russia) Dinamo Kazan	1–3	0–3
Voléro Zürich (Switzerland)	6–0	(Italy) RebecchiNMeccanica Piacenza	3–1	3–1

^{1}Omichka Omsk won the golden set 15–10

==== First leg ====
Date	Time		Score		Set 1	Set 2	Set 3	Set 4	Set 5	Total	Report
14 Jan	20:00	RC Cannes (France)	3–1	(Turkey) Galatasaray Daikin İstanbul	25–17	25–21	25–27	25–23		100–88	Report
15 Jan	19:00	Dinamo Moscow (Russia)	1–3	(Russia) Dinamo Kazan	21–25	21–25	25–18	16–25		83–93	Report
15 Jan	20:30	Doc-Imoco Conegliano (Italy)	3–0	(Russia) Omichka Omsk Region	25–23	25–18	25–23			75–64	Report
15 Jan	20:30	Atom Trefl Sopot (Poland)	0–3	(Turkey) Eczacıbaşı VitrA Istanbul	21–25	20–25	22–25			63–75	Report
16 Jan	18:00	Igtisadchi Baku (Azerbaijan)	0–3	(Turkey) VakıfBank İstanbul	22–25	20–25	20–25			62–75	Report
16 Jan	20:00	Voléro Zürich (Switzerland)	3–1	(Italy) Nordmeccanica Piacenza	25–18	24–26	26–24	25–19		100–87	Report

==== Second leg ====
Date	Time		Score		Set 1	Set 2	Set 3	Set 4	Set 5	Total	Report
21 Jan	17:30	Eczacıbaşı VitrA Istanbul (Turkey)	3–1	(Poland) Atom Trefl Sopot	16–25	25–21	25–21	25–20		91–87	Report
21 Jan	20:30	Nordmeccanica Piacenza (Italy)	1–3	(Switzerland) Voléro Zürich	25–22	18–25	20–25	19–25		82–97	Report
22 Jan	19:30	Dinamo Kazan (Russia)	3–0	(Russia) Dinamo Moscow	25–15	25–22	25–23			75–60	Report
22 Jan	20:30	VakıfBank İstanbul (Turkey)	3–0	(Azerbaijan) Igtisadchi Baku	25–13	25–12	25–20			75–45	Report
23 Jan	19:00	Omichka Omsk Region (Russia)	3–0	(Italy) Doc-Imoco Conegliano	25–20	25–19	29–27			79–66	Report
23 Jan	19:00	Galatasaray Daikin İstanbul (Turkey)	0–3	(France) RC Cannes	19–25	16–25	21–25			56–75	Report

=== Playoffs 6 ===
Team 1	Agg.	Team 2	1st leg	2nd leg
Omichka Omsk Region (Russia)	0–6	(Turkey) Eczacıbaşı VitrA Istanbul	1–3	0–3
VakıfBank İstanbul (Turkey)	3–3^{1}	(France) RC Cannes	3–1	1–3
Voléro Zürich (Switzerland)	0–6	(Russia) Dinamo Kazan	1–3	1–3

^{1}VakıfBank İstanbul won the golden set 15–12

==== First leg ====
Date	Time		Score		Set 1	Set 2	Set 3	Set 4	Set 5	Total	Report
6 Feb	19:00	Omichka Omsk Region (Russia)	1–3	(Turkey) Eczacıbaşı VitrA Istanbul	17–25	27–29	25–22	21–25		90–101	Report
6 Feb	20:00	VakıfBank İstanbul (Turkey)	3–1	(France) RC Cannes	21–25	25–7	25–18	25–9		96–59	Report
6 Feb	20:00	Voléro Zürich (Switzerland)	1–3	(Russia) Dinamo Kazan	25–20	14–25	25–27	22–25		86–97	Report

==== Second leg ====
Date	Time		Score		Set 1	Set 2	Set 3	Set 4	Set 5	Total	Report
11 Feb	19:00	Dinamo Kazan (Russia)	3–1	(Switzerland) Voléro Zürich	21–25	25–16	25–19	25–21		96–81	Report
12 Feb	20:00	RC Cannes (France)	3–1	(Turkey) VakıfBank İstanbul	19–25	25–17	25–22	25–22		94–86	Report
13 Feb	20:30	Eczacıbaşı VitrA Istanbul (Turkey)	3–0	(Russia) Omichka Omsk Region	25–19	25–21	25–16			75–56	Report

=== Final Four ===
The Final Four were played on 15 and 16 March 2014. The participants were the host team and the three winners of Playoff 6 round.

- Organizer: (Azerbaijan) Rabita Baku
- Venue: Baku Crystal Hall, Baku, Azerbaijan

==== Bracket ====
Semifinals
(Russia) Dinamo Kazan	3
(Azerbaijan) Rabita Baku	0
(Turkey) VakıfBank İstanbul	3
(Turkey) Eczacıbaşı VitrA Istanbul	1

Final
(Russia) Dinamo Kazan	3
(Turkey) VakıfBank İstanbul	0
Third place
(Azerbaijan) Rabita Baku	3
(Turkey) Eczacıbaşı VitrA Istanbul	0

==== Semifinals ====
Date	Time		Score		Set 1	Set 2	Set 3	Set 4	Set 5	Total	Report
15 Mar	16:00	VakıfBank İstanbul (Turkey)	3–1	(Turkey) Eczacıbaşı VitrA Istanbul	19–25	25–19	25–22	25–17		94–83	Report
15 Mar	19:00	Dinamo Kazan (Russia)	3–0	(Azerbaijan) Rabita Baku	25–15	25–21	25–19			75–55	Report

==== 3rd place match ====
Date	Time		Score		Set 1	Set 2	Set 3	Set 4	Set 5	Total	Report
16 Mar	16:00	Rabita Baku (Azerbaijan)	3–0	(Turkey) Eczacıbaşı VitrA Istanbul	25–21	25–12	27–25			77–58	Report

==== Final ====
Date	Time		Score		Set 1	Set 2	Set 3	Set 4	Set 5	Total	Report
16 Mar	19:00	Dinamo Kazan (Russia)	3–0	(Turkey) VakıfBank İstanbul	25–23	25–11	25–23			75–57	Report

== Final standing ==
Rank	Team
1st place, gold medalist(s)	(Russia) Dinamo Kazan
2nd place, silver medalist(s)	(Turkey) VakıfBank İstanbul
3rd place, bronze medalist(s)	(Azerbaijan) Rabita Baku
4	(Turkey) Eczacıbaşı VitrA Istanbul

2013–14 Women's Club European Champions

1st title

Roster for Final Four
Borodakova, Malkova, Rossamakhina, Frolova, Larson, Gamova, Startseva, Ulanova, Del Core, Melnikova, Moroz and Voronkova
Head coach
Gilyazutdinov

== Awards ==
Award	Winner	Team
MVP	(Russia) Ekaterina Gamova	(Russia) Dinamo Kazan
Best scorer	(Russia) Ekaterina Gamova	(Russia) Dinamo Kazan
Best setter	(Thailand) Nootsara Tomkom	(Azerbaijan) Rabita Baku
Best blocker	(United States) Jordan Larson	(Russia) Dinamo Kazan
Best server	(Italy) Antonella Del Core	(Russia) Dinamo Kazan
Best spiker	(Turkey) Neslihan Demir	(Turkey) Eczacıbaşı VitrA Istanbul
Best receiver	(Italy) Carolina Costagrande	(Turkey) VakıfBank İstanbul
Best libero	(Dominican Republic) Brenda Castillo	(Azerbaijan) Rabita Baku
Fair play award	(Turkey) Naz Aydemir	(Turkey) VakıfBank İstanbul
