= Ana Carolina da Silva =

Brazilian volleyball player (born 1991)

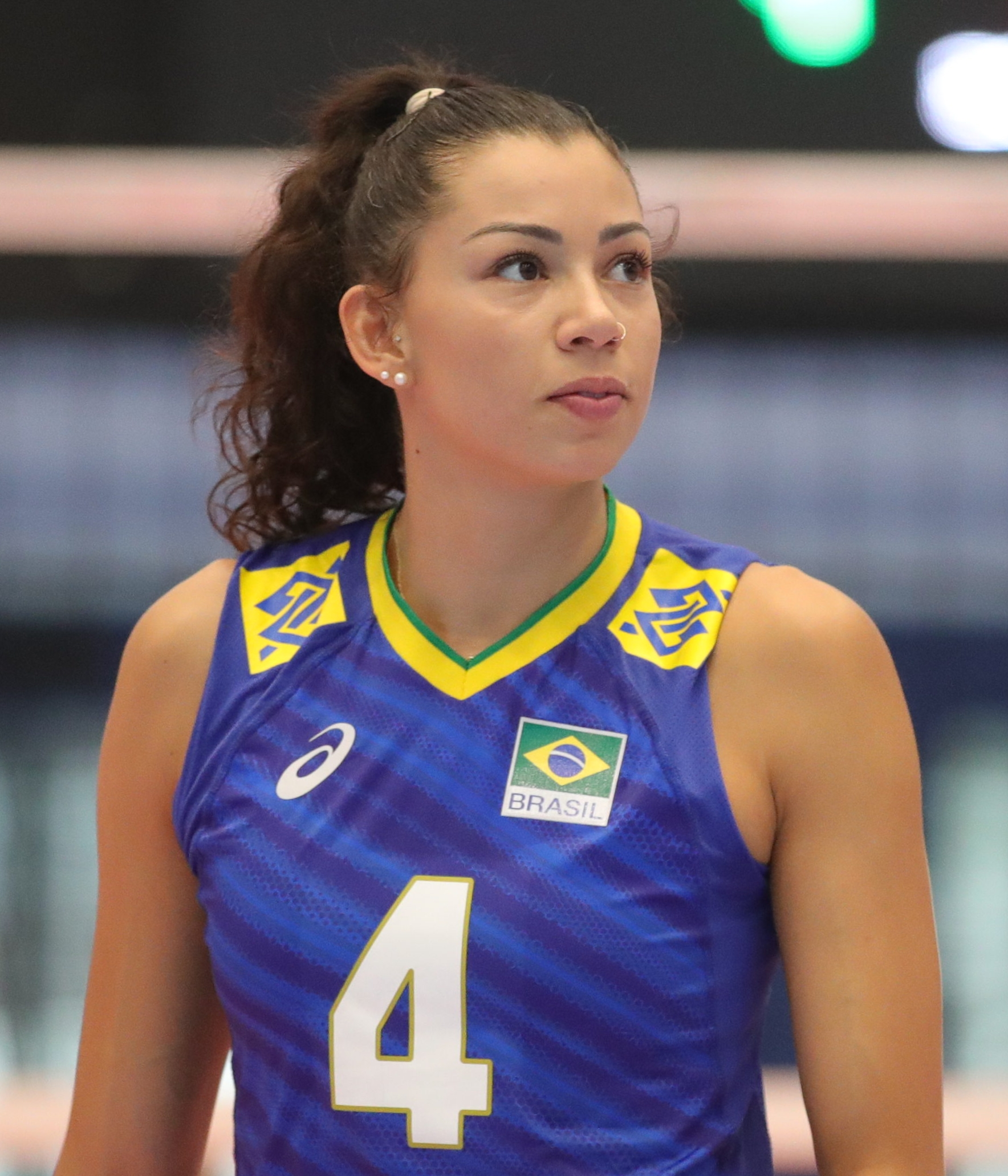
- Da Silva in 2022

Personal information
- Full name: Ana Carolina da Silva
- Nickname: Carolana
- Nationality: Brazilian
- Born: 8 April 1991 (age 35); Belo Horizonte, Minas Gerais, Brazil
- Height: 1.83 m (6 ft 0 in)
- Weight: 73 kg (161 lb)
- Spike: 316 cm (124 in)
- Block: 309 cm (122 in)

Volleyball information
- Position: Middle-Blocker
- Current club: (United States) LOVB Nebraska
- Number: 15

Career
Years	Teams
2005–10	(Brazil) Mackenzie/Newton Paiva
2010–11	(Brazil) Pinheiros/Mackenzie
2011–12	(Brazil) Unilever Vôlei
2012–13	(Brazil) EC Pinheiros
2013–17	(Brazil) Rio de Janeiro Vôlei Clube
2017–18	(Turkey) Nilüfer Belediyespor
2018–23	(Brazil) Dentil/Praia Clube
2023—25	(Italy) Savino del Bene Scandicci
2025—	(United States) LOVB Nebraska

National team
2014–2024	Brazil
Honours
Women's volleyball
Representing Brazil
Olympic Games
Silver medal – second place	2020 Tokyo	Team
Bronze medal – third place	2024 Paris	Team
World Championship
Silver medal – second place	2022 Netherlands/Poland	Team
Bronze medal – third place	2014 Italy	Team
World Grand Champions Cup
Silver medal – second place	2017 Japan	Team
Nations League
Silver medal – second place	2019 Nanjing	Team
Silver medal – second place	2021 Rimini	Team
Silver medal – second place	2022 Ankara	Team
World Grand Prix
Gold medal – first place	2014 Tokyo	Team
Gold medal – first place	2017 Nanjing	Team
Bronze medal – third place	2015 Omaha	Team
Montreux Volley Masters
Gold medal – first place	2017 Switzerland	Team
South American Championship
Gold medal – first place	2015 Cartagena
Gold medal – first place	2017 Cali
Gold medal – first place	2019 Cajamarca
Gold medal – first place	2021 Barrancabermeja
Gold medal – first place	2023 Recife

Ana Carolina da Silva (Brazilian Portuguese pronunciation: [ˈɐnɐ kaɾoˈlinɐ da ˈsiwvɐ]; born 8 April 1991) is a Brazilian indoor volleyball player. She plays as a Middle blocker and was a member of the Brazil women's national volleyball team from 2014 to 2024.

== Career ==
Da Silva won the silver medal and the Best Middle Blocker award at the 2013 Club World Championship playing with Unilever Vôlei. Da Silva played with her national team, winning the bronze at the 2014 World Championship when her team defeated Italy 3–2 in the bronze medal match.

During the 2015 FIVB Club World Championship, Da Silva played with the Brazilian club Rexona Ades Rio and her team lost the bronze medal match to the Swiss Voléro Zürich, Nonetheless, she won the tournament's Best Blocker award along with the Croatian Maja Poljak. She averaged 1.07 stuff blocks per set, just behind Poljak who blocked 1.19.

She won the 2017 South American Championship Best Middle Blocker award. and later the 2017 FIVB World Grand Champions Cup Best Middle Blocker award. In 2021, she competed for the first time in the Olympics in Tokyo 2020, winning silver medal with Brazil Volleyball Team. In the 2022 World Championship, won the silver medal after losing the final match against Serbia.

On 11 August 2024, Brazil defeated Turkey in the bronze medal match and Da Silva won her second olympic medal at the Paris 2024 Olympics.

On 2 August 2025, Carol announced her retirement after 10 years defending the Brazilian National Team.

== Personal life ==
On 2 March 2023, Da Silva married her long-time partner Anne Buijs, who is also a player for the Netherlands' National Team. They've been together since 2016, when they were both playing for the same club in Rio de Janeiro, Rexona-Sesc. After that they played together for two international volleyball clubs, Nilufer in Turkey and Praia Clube located in Uberlândia, Brazil, where they got married. Playing together they won two times the Brazilian Superliga, in 2016/17 and 2022/23. They also played the same olympics for the first time, in Paris 2024, with their respective countries.

== Awards ==
=== Individuals ===
==== In teams ====
- 2013 FIVB Club World Championship – "Best Middle Blocker"
- 2013 FIVB Club World Championship – "Best Blocker"
- 2015 FIVB Club World Championship – "Best Middle Blocker"
- 2014–15 Brazilian Superliga – "Best Blocker"
- 2015–16 Brazilian Superliga – "Best Blocker"
- 2015–16 Brazilian Superliga – "Best Server"
- 2018–19 Brazilian Superliga – "Best Blocker"
- 2018–19 Brazilian Superliga – "Best Middle Blocker"
- 2020–21 Brazilian Superliga – "Best Middle Blocker"
- 2021–22 Brazilian Superliga – "Best Middle Blocker"
- 2022–23 Brazilian Superliga – "Best Middle Blocker"
- 2017–18 Turkish Women's Volleyball League – "Best Middle Blocker"
- 2017–18 Turkish Women's Volleyball League – "Best Blocker"
- 2015 South American Club Championship – "Best Middle Blocker"
- 2016 South American Club Championship – "Best Middle Blocker"
- 2016 South American Club Championship – "Most Valuable Player"
- 2020 South American Club Championship – "Best Middle Blocker"
- 2022 South American Club Championship – "Best Middle Blocker"

==== In Brazil's national team ====
- 2014 Montreux Volley Masters – "Best Blocker"
- 2017 Montreux Volley Masters – "Best Middle Blocker"
- 2017 Montreux Volley Masters – "Most Valuable Player"
- 2017 South American Championship – "Best Middle Blocker"
- 2021 South American Championship – "Best Middle Blocker"
- 2017 FIVB World Grand Champions Cup – "Best Middle Blocker"
- 2017 FIVB World Grand Champions Cup – "Best Blocker"
- 2022 FIVB Nations League – "Best Middle Blocker"
- 2022 World Championship – "Best Middle Blocker"

=== Clubs ===
- 2011-12 Brazilian Superliga – Runner-Up, with Unilever Vôlei
- 2013-14 Brazilian Superliga – Champion, with Unilever Vôlei
- 2014-15 Brazilian Superliga – Champion, with Rexona-Ades
- 2015-16 Brazilian Superliga – Champion, with Rexona-Ades
- 2016-17 Brazilian Superliga – Champion, with Rexona-Sesc
- 2013 FIVB Club World Championship – Runner-Up, with Unilever Vôlei
- 2015 South American Club Championship – Champion, with Rexona-Ades
- 2016 South American Club Championship – Champion, with Rexona-Ades
- 2017 South American Club Championship – Champion, with Rexona-Sesc
- 2018-19 Brazilian Superliga – Runner-Up, with Dentil/Praia Clube
- 2019 South American Club Championship – Runner-Up, with Dentil/Praia Clube
- 2020 South American Club Championship – Runner-Up, with Dentil/Praia Clube
- 2020-21 Brazilian Superliga – Runner-Up, with Dentil/Praia Clube
- 2021 South American Club Championship – Champion, with Dentil/Praia Clube
- 2021-22 Brazilian Superliga – Runner-Up, with Dentil/Praia Clube
- 2022 South American Club Championship – Runner-Up, with Dentil/Praia Clube
- 2022-23 Brazilian Superliga – Champion, with Dentil/Praia Clube
- 2023 South American Club Championship – Champion, with Dentil/Praia Clube
- 2023-24 Italian Superliga - Runner-Up, with Savino Del Bene Scandicci
- 2024-25 Champions League - Runner-Up, with Savino Del Bene Scandicci

Awards
Preceded by Not awarded - (Brazil) Thaísa Menezes (Russia) Regina Moroz	Best Middle Blocker of FIVB Club World Championship; 2013 ex aequo (Germany) Christiane Fürst; 2015 ex aequo (Croatia) Maja Poljak	Succeeded by (Brazil) Thaísa Menezes (Russia) Regina Moroz - (United States) Foluke Akinradewo (Serbia) Milena Rašić
Preceded by (China) Hui Ruoqi	Most Valuable Player of Montreux Volley Masters; 2017	Succeeded by (Italy) Paola Egonu
Preceded by (China) Zhang Xiaoya and (Thailand) Hattaya Bamrungsuk	Best Middle Blocker of Montreux Volley Masters; 2017 ex aequo (Germany) Marie Schölzel	Succeeded by -
Preceded by (Russia) Iuliia Morozova and (Thailand) Pleumjit Thinkaow	Best Middle Blocker of World Grand Champions Cup; 2017 ex aequo (China) Yuan Xinyue	Succeeded by -
Preceded by (Turkey) Eda Erdem and (Brazil) Carol Gattaz	Best Middle Blocker of FIVB Nations League; 2022 (with (Serbia) Jovana Stevanović)	Succeeded by (Turkey) Zehra Güneş and (China) Yuan Xinyue
Preceded by (China) Yan Ni and (Serbia) Milena Rašić	Best Middle Blocker of FIVB World Championship; 2022 (with (Italy) Anna Danesi)	Succeeded by (Italy) Anna Danesi and (Turkey) Eda Erdem
