= Bárbara Bruch =

Brazilian volleyball player (born 1987)

Barbara Bruch

Personal information
- Full name: Bárbara Louise Bruch
- Nationality: Brazilian
- Born: 28 May 1987 (age 39); Blumenau, Santa Catarina
- Height: 1.88 m (6 ft 2 in)
- Weight: 72 kg (159 lb)
- Spike: 298 cm (117 in)
- Block: 279 cm (110 in)

Volleyball information
- Position: Middle Blocker
- Current club: Retired

National team
2015	Brazil
Honours
Women's volleyball
Representing Brazil
Pan American Games
Silver medal – second place	2015 Toronto	Team

Barbara Bruch (born 28 May 1987) is a Brazilian female volleyball player.

With her club SESI-SP she competed at the 2014 FIVB Volleyball Women's Club World Championship.

== Clubs ==
- (Brazil) Osasco Vôlei (2002–2004)
- (Brazil) São Caetano (2004–2008)
- (Brazil) Osasco Vôlei (2008–2009)
- (Brazil) EC Pinheiros (2009–2012)
- (Brazil) Minas Tênis Clube (2012–2013)
- (Brazil) SESI-SP (2013–2014)
- (Brazil) Brasília Vôlei (2015–2016)
- (Brazil) EC Pinheiros (2016–2017)

== Awards ==
=== Clubs ===
- 2002–03 Brazilian Superliga – Champion, with Osasco Vôlei
- 2003–04 Brazilian Superliga – Champion, with Osasco Vôlei
- 2008–09 Brazilian Superliga – Runner-up, with Osasco Vôlei
- 2013–14 Brazilian Superliga – Runner-up, with SESI-SP
- 2009 South American Club Championship – Champion, with Osasco Vôlei
- 2014 South American Club Championship – Champion, with SESI-SP
- 2014 FIVB Club World Championship – Bronze medal, with SESI-SP
