= Suelen Pinto =

Brazilian volleyball player (born 1987)

Personal information
- Full name: Suelen Fernanda Santana Pinto
- Nationality: Brazilian
- Born: 4 October 1987 (age 39); Belo Horizonte, Minas Gerais
- Height: 1.66 m (5 ft 5 in)
- Weight: 81 kg (179 lb)
- Spike: 256 cm (101 in)
- Block: 238 cm (94 in)

Volleyball information
- Position: Libero
- Current club: Dentil Praia Clube
- Number: 8

Career
Years	Teams
2004–06; 2006–08; 2008–10; 2010–12; 2012–13; 2013–16; 2016–17; 2017–present	(Brazil) Minas Tênis Clube (Brazil) Vôlei Futuro (Brazil) São Caetano (Brazil) EC Pinheiros (Brazil) Vôlei Amil (Brazil) SESI-SP (Italy) Foppapedretti Bergamo (Brazil) Dentil Praia Clube

National team
2013–2019	Brazil
Honours
Women's volleyball
Representing Brazil
World Grand Champions Cup
Silver medal – second place	2017 Japan	Team
World Grand Prix
Gold medal – first place	2017 Nanjing	Team
Montreux Volley Masters
Gold medal – first place	2013 Switzerland
Gold medal – first place	2017 Switzerland	Team
South American Championship
Gold medal – first place	2017 Cali
Gold medal – first place	2019 Cajamarca

Suelen Pinto (born 4 October 1987) is a Brazilian female volleyball player. With her club SESI-SP she competed at the 2014 FIVB Volleyball Women's Club World Championship.

== Awards ==
=== Individual ===
- 2004 U20 South American Championship – "Best Receiver"
- 2005 Pan-American Cup – "Best Receiver"
- 2008–09 Brazilian Superliga – "Best Receiver"
- 2014 South American Club Championship – "Best Libero"
- 2017–18 Brazilian Superliga – "Best Digger"
- 2018 FIVB Nations League – "Best Libero"

=== Clubs ===
- 2013–14 Brazilian Superliga – Runner-up, with SESI-SP
- 2017–18 Brazilian Superliga – Champion, with Dentil/Praia Clube
- 2018–19 Brazilian Superliga – Runner-up, with Dentil/Praia Clube
- 2020–21 Brazilian Superliga – Runner-up, with Dentil/Praia Clube
- 2021–22 Brazilian Superliga – Runner-up, with Dentil/Praia Clube
- 2022–23 Brazilian Superliga – Champion, with Dentil/Praia Clube
- 2014 South American Club Championship – Champion, with SESI-SP
- 2019 South American Club Championship – Runner-up, with Dentil/Praia Clube
- 2020 South American Club Championship – Runner-up, with Dentil/Praia Clube
- 2021 South American Club Championship – Champion, with Dentil/Praia Clube
- 2022 South American Club Championship – Runner-up, with Dentil/Praia Clube

Awards
Preceded by –	Best Libero of FIVB Nations League; 2018	Succeeded by (United States) Megan Courtney
