= Ana Beatriz Corrêa =

Brazilian volleyball player (born 1992)

Ana Beatriz Correa
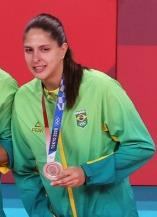
- Corrêa in 2021

Personal information
- Full name: Ana Beatriz Silva Correa
- Born: February 7, 1992 (age 34); Sorocaba, São Paulo, Brazil
- Height: 1.88 m (6 ft 2 in)
- Weight: 78 kg (172 lb)
- Spike: 298 cm (117 in)
- Block: 292 cm (115 in)

Volleyball information
- Position: Middle-Blocker
- Current club: (United States) LOVB Madison
- Number: 27

Career
Years	Teams
2008–09	(Brazil) Finasa/Osasco
2009–11	(Brazil) Banana Boat/Praia Clube
2011–12	(Brazil) Sollys Nestlé/Osasco
2012–16	(Brazil) Sesi-SP
2016–18	(Brazil) Vôlei Nestlé/Osasco
2018–19	(Brazil) Sesc-RJ
2019–21	(Brazil) Osasco/São Cristóvão Saúde
2021–22	(Italy) Savino Del Bene Scandicci
2022–23	(Turkey) Kuzeyboru Spor Kulübü
2023–24	(Italy) Smi Roma Volley
2024–	(United States) LOVB Madison

National team
2013; 2017-2021	Brazil
Honours
Women's volleyball
Representing Brazil
Olympic Games
Silver medal – second place	2020 Tokyo	Team
World Grand Champions Cup
Silver medal – second place	2017 Japan	Team
Nations League
Silver medal – second place	2019 Nanjing	Team
Silver medal – second place	2021 Rimini	Team
World Grand Prix
Gold medal – first place	2017 Nanjing	Team
South American Championship
Gold medal – first place	2019 Cajamarca
Gold medal – first place	2021 Barrancabermeja

Ana Beatriz Silva Correa (born 7 February 1992) is a Brazilian volleyball player. With her club SESI-SP she competed at the 2014 FIVB Volleyball Women's Club World Championship.

== Career ==
Correa won the 2017 FIVB World Grand Prix gold medal and the Best Middle Blocker individual award.

== Awards ==
=== Individuals ===
- 2009 FIVB U18 World Championship – "Best Blocker"
- 2017 FIVB World Grand Prix – "Best Middle Blocker"
- 2017–18 Brazilian Superliga – "Best Blocker"
- 2019 FIVB Nations League – "Best Middle Blocker"
- 2019 South American Championship – "Best Middle Blocker"

=== Clubs ===
- 2008–09 Brazilian Superliga – Runner-up, with Finasa/Osasco
- 2011–12 Brazilian Superliga – Champion, with Sollys Nestlé/Osasco
- 2013–14 Brazilian Superliga – Runner-up, with Sesi-SP
- 2014–15 Brazilian Superliga – Bronze medal, with Molico Nestlé/Osasco
- 2016–17 Brazilian Superliga – Runner-up, with Vôlei Nestlé/Osasco
- 2020–21 Brazilian Superliga – Bronze medal, with Osasco/São Cristóvão Saúde
- 2009 South American Club Championship – Champion, with Finasa/Osasco
- 2011 South American Club Championship – Champion, with Sollys Nestlé/Osasco
- 2014 South American Club Championship – Champion, with Sesi-SP
- 2011 FIVB Club World Championship – Bronze medal, with Sollys Nestlé/Osasco
- 2014 FIVB Club World Championship – Bronze medal, with Sesi-SP

Awards
Preceded by (Brazil) Thaísa Menezes and (United States) Rachael Adams	Best Middle Blocker of FIVB World Grand Prix; 2017 (with (Serbia) Milena Rašić)	Succeeded by Incumbent
