= Kenia Carcaces =

Cuban volleyball player (born 1986)

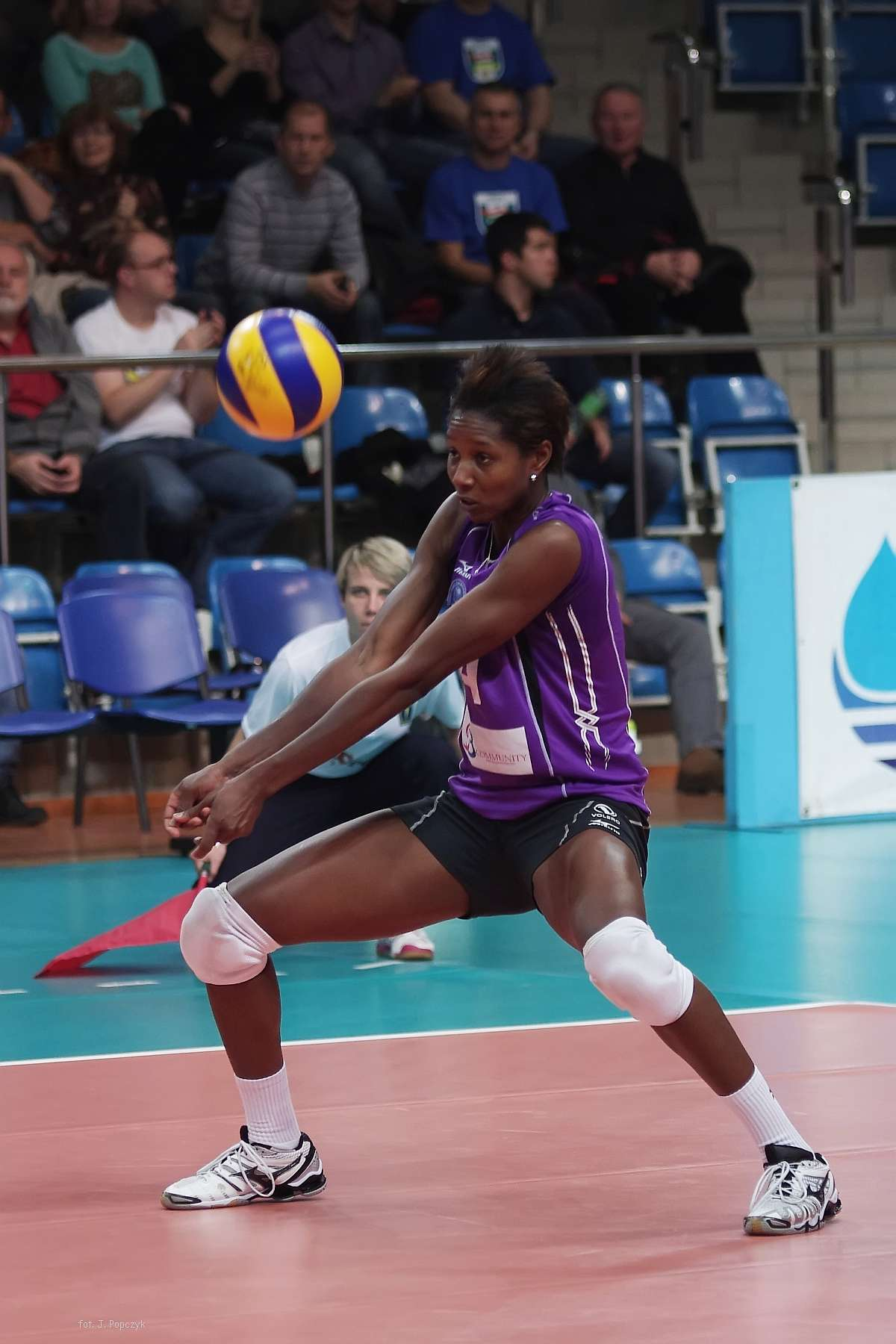

Personal information
- Full name: Kenia Carcaces Opón
- Born: 22 January 1986 (age 40); Holguín, Cuba
- Height: 1.89 m (6 ft 2 1/2 in)
- Weight: 69 kg (152 lb)
- Spike: 323 cm (127 in)
- Block: 306 cm (120 in)

Volleyball information
- Position: Outside hitter / Opposite
- Current club: Karşıyaka
- Number: 14

National team
2006–2011	Cuba
Honours
Women's volleyball
Representing Cuba
FIVB World Grand Prix
Silver medal – second place	2008 Yokohama	Team
Pan American Games
Gold medal – first place	2007 Rio de Janeiro	Team
Silver medal – second place	2011 Guadalajara	Team
Pan-American Cup
Gold medal – first place	2007 Colima	Team
NORCECA Championship
Gold medal – first place	2007 Winnipeg	Team
Bronze medal – third place	2011 Caguas	Team
- Last updated: October 2013

Kenia Carcaces Opón (born 22 January 1986), also known as Kenia Carcaces, is a Cuban volleyball player who currently plays for Karşıyaka in Turkey. She also competed in the 2008 Summer Olympics, finishing fourth with the Cuban team in the Olympic tournament. She won the 2007 Pan American Games gold medal in Rio de Janeiro, Brazil.

== Career ==
At the 2007 Cuban Liga Nacional, Carcaces was selected Best digger. Playing Ciudad de La Habana, she won the Cuban National League Championship for the 2010 season and also being selected Best spiker.

At the 2010 Montreux Volley Masters, Carcaces finished in third place, and she was selected Best scorer and Most Valuable Player.

Carcaces won the silver medal at the 2011 Pan American Games held in Guadalajara, Mexico.

Carcaces played at the 2013 Club World Championship with Voléro Zürich and she was selected Best Outside Hitter. Her team lost the bronze medal to Guangdong Evergrande.

Carcaces won the Best Outside Spiker among the Best Team of the 2014 FIVB Club World Championship after her club lost the bronze medal to the Brazilian SESI-SP 2–3.

In the 2015 South American Club Championship, Carcaces won the Most Valuable Player award and the silver medal in the continental championship.

== Clubs ==
- (Cuba) Holguín
- (Japan) Hisamitsu Springs (2005–2006)
- (Cuba) Ciudad de La Habana (2009–2010)
- (Switzerland) Voléro Zürich (2013–2014)
- (Brazil) Molico Osasco (2014–2016)
- (Switzerland) Voléro Zürich (2016–2017)
- (Japan) Saitama Ageo Medics (2017–2018)
- (Italy) VBC Èpiù Casalmaggiore (2018–2020)
- (Italy) Wealth Planet Perugia Volley (2020–2021)
- (Italy) Megabox Volley Vallefoglia (2021–2022)
- (Italy) Igor Gorgonzola Novara (2022–2023)
- (Greece) Panathinaikos (2023–2024)
- (Indonesia) Jakarta BIN (2024)
- (Turkey) Karşıyaka (2024)
- (Italy) Akademia Sant'Anna (2025)
- (Greece) Olympiacos (2026)

== Awards ==
=== Individual ===
- 2005–06 V.Premier League "Best scorer"
- 2007 Cuban Liga Nacional "Best spiker"
- 2010 Cuban Liga Nacional "Best digger"
- 2010 Montreux Volley Masters "Most valuable player"
- 2010 Montreux Volley Masters "Best scorer"
- 2010 Pan-American Cup "Best scorer"
- 2013 FIVB Club World Championship "Best outside hitter"
- 2014 FIVB Club World Championship "Best outside hitter"
- 2015 South American Club Championship "Most valuable player"

=== Club ===
- 2005–06 V.Premier League – Runner-up, with Hisamitsu Springs
- 2006 Kurowashiki All Japan Volleyball Tournament – Champion, with Hisamitsu Springs
- 2010 Cuban Liga Nacional – Champion, with Ciudad de La Habana
- 2014 Swiss Cup – Champion, with Voléro Zürich
- 2014 Swiss A League – Champion, with Voléro Zürich
- 2015 South American Club Championship – Champion, with Molico/Osasco
- 2016 Swiss Supercup – Champion, with Voléro Zürich
- 2017 FIVB Club World Championship – Bronze medal, with Voléro Zürich
- 2017 Swiss Cup – Champion, with Voléro Zürich
- 2017 Swiss A League – Champion, with Voléro Zürich
- 2023–24 Greek Volleyball League – Champion, with Panathinaikos
- 2024 Indonesian Women's Proliga – Champion, with Jakarta BIN

=== National team ===
==== Senior team ====
- 2007 Montreux Volley Masters – Silver medal
- 2007 Pan American Games – Gold medal
- 2007 NORCECA Championship – Gold medal
- 2008 FIVB World Grand Prix – Silver medal
- 2010 Montreux Volley Masters – Bronze medal
- 2011 Montreux Volley Masters – Silver medal
- 2011 Pan American Games – Silver medal

==== Junior team ====
- 2002 NORCECA Women´s Junior Continental Championship U-20 – Bronze medal

Awards
Preceded by Not awarded	Best Outside Hitter of FIVB Club World Championship; 2013 ex aequo (Turkey) Gözde Kırdar Sonsırma 2014 ex aequo (Brazil) Suelle Oliveira	Succeeded by (Russia) Tatiana Kosheleva (Brazil) Fernanda Garay
