= 2013–14 Champions League =

The 2013–14 Champions League can refer to:

- 2013–14 UEFA Champions League
- 2013–14 UEFA Women's Champions League
- 2013–14 CONCACAF Champions League
- 2013–14 OFC Champions League
- 2013–14 EHF Women's Champions League
- 2013–14 CEV Champions League
- 2013–14 CEV Women's Champions League
