= Serviço Social da Indústria-SP (women's volleyball) =

Serviço Social da Indústria-SP Volei Feminino
- Short name: SESI-SP
- Founded: 2011
- Chairman: Paulo Skaf
- Captain: Fabiana Claudino
- League: Brazilian Superliga
- 2017–18: 12th (relegated)
- Website: Club home page

Uniforms
Home	Away

Serviço Social da Indústria-SP Volei Feminino (SESI-SP) is a Brazilian women's volleyball club founded on 2011 based in São Paulo, Brazil and plays in the Brazilian Superliga.

== History ==
Created by SESI-SP President Paulo Skaf in 2011 as one of the newest teams in Brazil. Their achievements include two championships in São Paulo Cup. There have been 99 games played by the team.

They won the 14th edition of the South American Volleyball Club Championship women's edition in February 2014 to qualify for the 8th edition of the FIVB Women's Volleyball Club World Championship which was held in Zurich, Switzerland on May 7 to 11, 2014.

== Team roster ==
=== 2016–2017 team ===
Head coach: (Brazil) Giuliano Ribas

Shirt No	Nationality	Player	Position	Height	Birth Date
1	Brazilian	Juliana Mello	Middle Blocker	186	June 29, 1994 (age 31)
2	Brazilian	Giovana Gasparini	Setter	174	July 5, 1994 (age 31)
3	Brazilian	Natália Araujo	Libero	162	April 10, 1997 (age 28)
4	Brazilian	Natália Fernandes Silva	Wing Spiker	190	March 31, 1995 (age 30)
6	Brazilian	Gabriela Candido	Wing-Spiker	181	May 22, 1996 (age 29)
7	Brazilian	Mariane Cássia de Oliveira	Middle Blocker	187	February 7, 1995 (age 30)
8	Brazilian	Lorenne Teixeira	Opposite	185	January 8, 1996 (age 30)
10	Brazilian	Linda Jéssica Costa	Middle Blocker	188	September 2, 1994 (age 31)
11	Brazilian	Mayara Alexandre Santos	Middle Blocker	186	August 18, 1995 (age 30)
12	Brazilian	Thaís Evellin de Oliveira	Setter	180	April 1, 1996 (age 29)
13	Brazilian	Lais Vasques	Libero	174	February 12, 1996 (age 29)
14	Brazilian	Amabilie Tereza Koester	Wing-Spiker	185	April 14, 1995 (age 30)
15	Brazilian	Eduarda Regina Cavatão	Opposite	185	September 28, 1998 (age 27)
17	Brazilian	Isabela da Silveira Paquiardi	Wing-Spiker	180	April 3, 1992 (age 33)

2013–2014 Team
Shirt No	Nationality	Player	Position	Height	Birth Date
1	Brazilian	Fabiana Claudino (c)	Middle Blocker	193	January 24, 1985 (age 41)
2	Brazilian	Danielle Lins	Setter	181	January 5, 1985 (age 41)
4	Brazilian	Suelle Oliveira	Wing Spiker	187	April 29, 1987 (age 38)
5	Brazilian	Alessandra Januario Dos Santos	Unknown	174	April 13, 1988 (age 37)
6	Brazilian	Barbara Bruch	Middle Blocker	186	May 28, 1987 (age 38)
7	Brazilian	Priscila Daroit	Unknown	182	August 10, 1988 (age 37)
8	Brazilian	Suelen Pinto	Libero	166	October 4, 1987 (age 38)
9	Brazilian	Natalia Fernandes Silva	Unknown	191	March 31, 1995 (age 30)
10	Brazilian	Mariana Casemiro	Unknown	181	March 27, 1987 (age 38)
11	Brazilian	Ivna Marra	Unknown	185	January 25, 1990 (age 36)
12	Brazilian	Carolina Albuquerque	Setter	182	July 25, 1977 (age 48)
13	Brazilian	Francyne Aparecida Jacintho	Unknown	190	July 16, 1992 (age 33)
14	Brazilian	Dayse Figueiredo	Wing Spiker	183	June 27, 1984 (age 41)
15	Brazilian	Sarah Blefari Nather	Setter	171	February 2, 1993 (age 32)
17	Brazilian	Juliana Costa	Unknown	186	May 9, 1982 (age 43)
18	Brazilian	Juliana Paes Fillipelli	Unknown	164	May 18, 1994 (age 31)
19	Brazilian	Stephanie Cristina Apolinário Corrêa	Unknown	186	July 15, 1994 (age 31)
20	Brazilian	Ana Beatriz Correa	Unknown	187	February 7, 1992 (age 33)

== Technical and managerial staff ==
Name	Role	Nationality
Tavolari Neto Renato	Team Manager	Brazilian
Curto De Oliveira Talmo	Coach	Brazilian
Dantas Borges Ferrante Alexandre	Assistant Coach	Brazilian
Juliano Ribas	2nd Assistant Coach	Brazilian
Xavier Segio Augusto	Doctor	Brazilian
Planas Corrêa Da Silva Raphael	Physiotherapist	Brazilian

== Honors ==
- FIVB Club World Championship

Third Place (1): 2014

- Women's South American Volleyball Club Championship

Champions (1): 2014

- Superliga

Runner-Up (1): 2014
Fourth (1): 2013
Fifth (1): 2012

- São Paulo Volleyball Cup

Champion (1): 2012

== See also ==
- Serviço Social da Indústria-SP (men's volleyball)
