= 2015 Women's South American Volleyball Club Championship =

Volleyball tournament

Tournament details
- Host country: Brazil
- Dates: 4 – 8 February 2015
- Teams: 8
- Venue: 1 (in São Paulo host cities)

Final positions
- Champions: (Brazil) Rexona Ades (2nd title)

Tournament awards
- MVP: Kenia Carcaces (CUB)

The 2015 Women's South American Volleyball Club Championship was the seventh official edition of the women's volleyball tournament, played by eight teams from 4 – 8 February 2015 in São Paulo, Brazil. The Brazilian club Rexona Ades claimed their second title defeating another Brazilian club, Molico/Osasco 3–1 in the final match.

== Competing clubs ==
Teams were seeded in two pools of four according to how the representatives of their countries finished in the 2014 edition.

Pool A	Pool B
(Brazil) Molico/Osasco (Peru) Universidad San Martín (Chile) Boston College (Uruguay) Atlético Bohemios	(Brazil) Rexona Ades (Argentina) Villa Dora (Venezuela) Aragua (Bolivia) Universidad San Francísco Xavier

== Preliminary round ==
- All times are Brasília Time (UTC−03:00).

== First round ==
=== Pool A ===
Pos	Team	Pld	W	L	Pts	SW	SL	SR	SPW	SPL	SPR	Qualification
1	(Brazil) Molico/Osasco	3	3	0	9	9	0	MAX	225	110	2.045	Semifinals
2	(Peru) Universidad San Martín	3	2	1	6	6	3	2.000	212	161	1.317	Semifinals
3	(Chile) Boston College	3	1	2	3	3	6	0.500	157	196	0.801	
4	(Uruguay) Atlético Bohemios	3	0	3	0	0	9	0.000	98	225	0.436	

Date		Score		Set 1	Set 2	Set 3	Set 4	Set 5	Total
4 Feb	Universidad San Martín (Peru)	3–0	(Chile) Boston College	25–20	25–15	25–20			75–55
4 Feb	Molico/Osasco (Brazil)	3–0	(Uruguay) Atlético Bohemios	25–4	25–9	25–8			75–21
5 Feb	Universidad San Martín (Peru)	3–0	(Uruguay) Atlético Bohemios	25–11	25–13	25–7			75–31
5 Feb	Molico/Osasco (Brazil)	3–0	(Chile) Boston College	25–11	25–4	25–12			75–27
6 Feb	Boston College (Chile)	3–0	(Uruguay) Atlético Bohemios	25–16	25–18	25–12			75–46
6 Feb	Molico/Osasco (Brazil)	3–0	(Peru) Universidad San Martín	25–23	25–22	25–17			75–62

=== Pool B ===
Pos	Team	Pld	W	L	Pts	SW	SL	SR	SPW	SPL	SPR	Qualification
1	(Brazil) Rexona Ades	3	3	0	9	9	0	MAX	225	114	1.974	Semifinals
2	(Argentina) Atlético Villa Dora	2	2	0	6	6	1	6.000	226	214	1.056	Semifinals
3	(Venezuela) Aragua	3	1	2	3	4	7	0.571	224	240	0.933	
4	(Bolivia) Universidad San Francísco Xavier	3	0	3	0	1	9	0.111	140	247	0.567	

Date		Score		Set 1	Set 2	Set 3	Set 4	Set 5	Total
4 Feb	Villa Dora (Argentina)	3–0	(Bolivia) Universidad San Francísco Xavier	25–15	25–19	25–15			75–49
4 Feb	Aragua (Venezuela)	0–3	(Brazil) Rexona Ades	17–25	9–25	11–25			37–75
5 Feb	Villa Dora (Argentina)	3–1	(Venezuela) Aragua	19–25	26–24	26–24	25–17		96–90
5 Feb	Rexona Ades (Brazil)	3–0	(Bolivia) Universidad San Francísco Xavier	25–5	25–12	25–5			75–22
6 Feb	Universidad San Francísco Xavier (Bolivia)	1–3	(Venezuela) Aragua	25–22	15–25	12–25	17–25		69–97
6 Feb	Rexona Ades (Brazil)	3–0	(Argentina) Villa Dora	25–15	25–17	25–23			75–55

== Final round ==
=== Bracket ===
Semifinals
February 08 – São Paulo
(Brazil) Molico/Osasco	3
(Argentina) Villa Dora	0
February 08 – São Paulo
(Peru) Universidad San Martín	0
(Brazil) Rexona Ades	3

Final
February 09 – São Paulo
(Brazil) Molico/Osasco	1
(Brazil) Rexona Ades	3
3rd place
February 09 – São Paulo
(Peru) Universidad San Martín	3
(Argentina) Villa Dora	0

== Final standing ==
Rank	Team
1st place, gold medalist(s)	(Brazil) Rexona Ades
2nd place, silver medalist(s)	(Brazil) Molico/Osasco
3rd place, bronze medalist(s)	(Peru) Universidad San Martín
4	(Argentina) Villa Dora
5	(Chile) Boston College
6	(Venezuela) Aragua
7	(Bolivia) Universidad San Francísco Xavier
8	(Uruguay) Atlético Bohemios

Qualified for the 2015 FIVB Volleyball Women's Club World Championship

2015 Women's South American Volleyball Club Champions

2nd title

== All-Star team ==
- Most valuable player
  - (Cuba) Kenia Carcaces (Molico/Osasco)
- Best Opposite
  - (Brazil) Marianne Steinbrecher (Molico/Osasco)
- Best Outside Hitters
  - (Brazil) Gabriela Guimarães (Rexona Ades)
  - (Peru) Angela Leyva (Universidad San Martín)
- Best setter
  - (Brazil) Dani Lins (Molico/Osasco)
- Best Middle Blockers
  - (Brazil) Ana Carolina da Silva (Rexona Ades)
  - (Venezuela) Milagros Hernández (Aragua)
- Best libero
  - (Brazil) Fabiana de Oliveira (Rexona Ades)
