= Ana Maria Gosling =

Brazilian volleyball player (born 1985)

Personal information
- Full name: Ana Maria Padão Gosling
- Nationality: Brazilian
- Born: 24 January 1985 (age 41)
- Height: 176 cm (5 ft 9 in)
- Weight: 64 kg (141 lb)
- Spike: 288 cm (113 in)
- Block: 276 cm (109 in)

Career
Years	Teams
2011; 2014	Sollys Nestlé Osasco; Molico/Osasco

Ana Maria Padão Gosling (born 24 January 1985) is a Brazilian female volleyball player.

With her club Sollys Nestlé Osasco she competed at the 2011 FIVB Volleyball Women's Club World Championship and with Molico/Osasco at the 2014 FIVB Volleyball Women's Club World Championship.
