= Ekaterina Ulanova =

Russian volleyball player

Personal information
- Full name: Ekaterina Vladimirovna Kabeshova Ulanova
- Nationality: Russian
- Born: August 5, 1986 (age 40); Ivanovo, Soviet Union
- Height: 1.72 m (5 ft 8 in)
- Weight: 61 kg (134 lb)
- Spike: 298 cm (117 in)
- Block: 290 cm (110 in)

Volleyball information
- Position: Libero
- Current club: Dinamo Kazan
- Number: 14

National team
2004 - 2012	Russia
Honours
Women's volleyball
Representing Russia
World Championship
Gold medal – first place	2010 Japan	Team
FIVB World Grand Prix
Silver medal – second place	2009 Tokyo	Team
European Championship
Bronze medal – third place	2005 Zagreb-Pula	Team
Bronze medal – third place	2007 Charleroi-Luxembourg	Team
- Last updated: May 2014

Ekaterina Ulanova (née Kabeshova) (Russian: Екатерина Владимировна Кабешова; born August 5, 1986) is a Russian volleyball player. She competed for the Russia women's national volleyball team in the 2008 and the 2012 Summer Olympics. She also won the gold medal at the 2014 FIVB Club World Championship, playing with Dinamo Kazan.

== Personal and early life ==
Ulanova is 172 cm (5 ft 8 in) tall 61 kilograms (134 lb), born as Yekaterina Vladimirovna Kabeshova on August 5, 1986, in Ivanovo, Soviet Union. She married the CSKA Moscow football player Ivan Ulanov in 2011.

== Career ==
In 2010, she joined Dinamo Kazan, winning with this team the Russian Superleague in 2011, 2012 and 2013 and two times the Russian Cup, in 2010 and 2012.

Ulanova won with the Russian club Dinamo Kazan the 2013–14 CEV Champions League held in Baku, Azerbaijan, defeating 3-0 the home owners Rabita Baku in the semifinals and 3–0 to the Turkish VakıfBank İstanbul in the final.

Ulanova won the 2014 FIVB Club World Championship gold medal playing with the Russian club Dinamo Kazan that defeated 3–0 the Brazilian Molico Osasco in the championship match. She was also awarded competition's Best Libero.

== Clubs ==
- (Russia) Olympia Shuja (2003–2004)
- (Russia) Dinamo Moscow (2004–2006)
- (Russia) CSKA Moscow 2006–2007)
- (Russia) Leningradka Saint Petersburg (2007–2009)
- (Russia) Dynamo Krasnodar (2009–2010)
- (Russia) Dinamo Kazan (2010–2014)

== Awards ==
=== Individuals ===
- 2011 Russian Cup "Best Libero"
- 2011 Russian Cup "Best Receiver"
- 2014 FIVB Club World Championship "Best Libero"

=== Clubs ===
- 2011 Russian League Championship – Champion, with Dinamo Kazan
- 2011–12 CEV Champions League – Bronze medal, with Dinamo Kazan
- 2012 Russian League Championship – Champion, with Dinamo Kazan
- 2013 Russian League Championship – Champion, with Dinamo Kazan
- 2013–14 CEV Champions League - Champion, with Dinamo Kazan
- 2014 FIVB Club World Championship – Champion, with Dinamo Kazan
- 2016–17 CEV Cup – Champion, with Dinamo Kazan
