= Fabiana Claudino =

Brazilian volleyball player (born 1985)

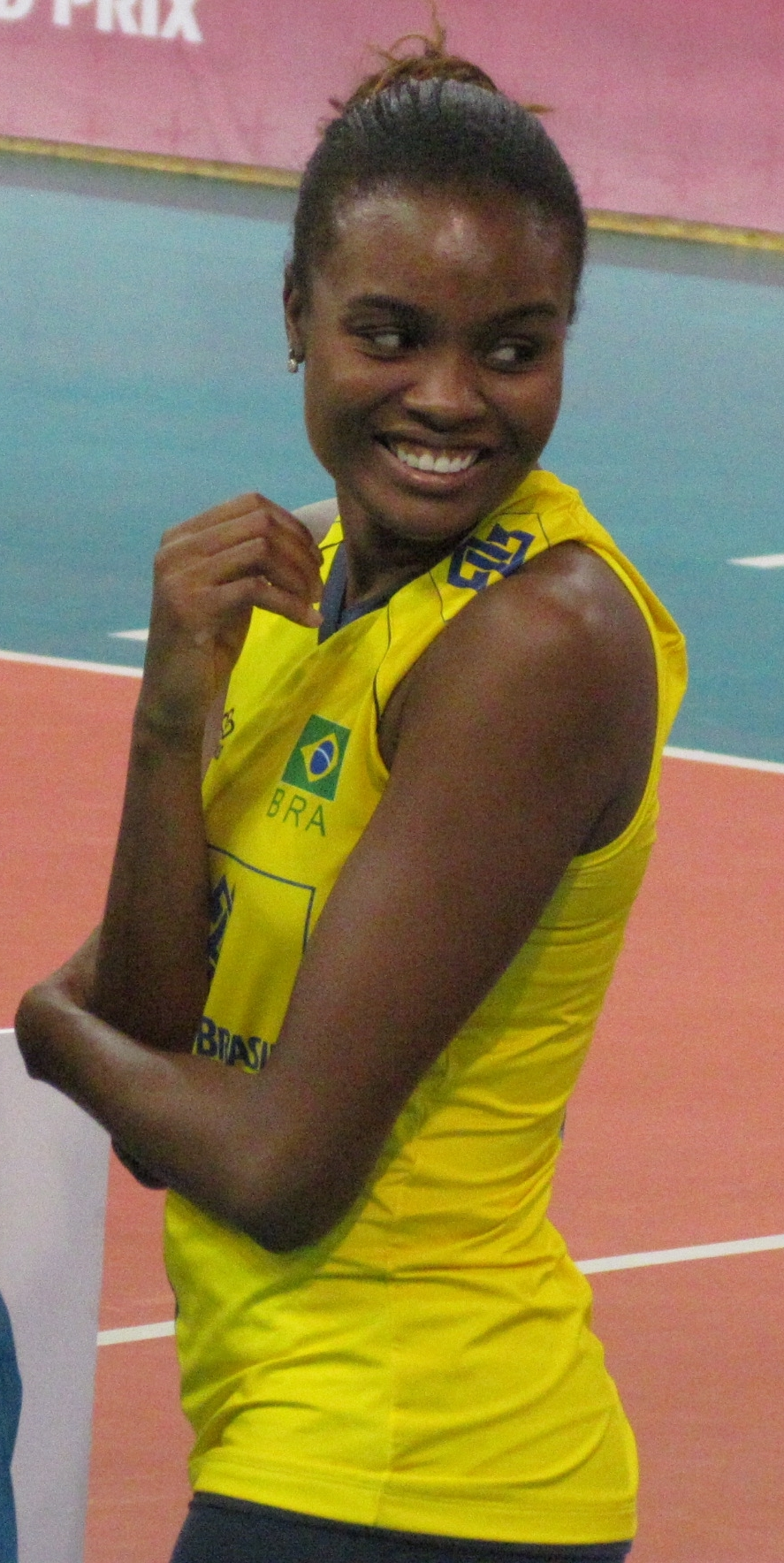

Personal information
- Full name: Fabiana Marcelino Claudino
- Nickname: Fabizona
- Born: 24 January 1985 (age 41); Belo Horizonte, Brazil
- Hometown: Belo Horizonte, Brazil
- Height: 1.94 m (6 ft 4 in)
- Weight: 76 kg (168 lb)
- Spike: 314 cm (124 in)
- Block: 293 cm (115 in)

Volleyball information
- Position: Middle blocker

National team
2003–16 / 2019	Brazil
Medal record
Women's volleyball
Representing Brazil
Olympic Games
Gold medal – first place	2008 Beijing	Team
Gold medal – first place	2012 London	Team
World Championship
Silver medal – second place	2006 Japan	Team
Silver medal – second place	2010 Japan	Team
Bronze medal – third place	2014 Italy	Team
World Cup
Silver medal – second place	2003 Japan	Team
Silver medal – second place	2007 Japan	Team
World Grand Prix
Gold medal – first place	2004 Reggio Calabria	Team
Gold medal – first place	2006 Reggio Calabria	Team
Gold medal – first place	2008 Yokohama	Team
Gold medal – first place	2009 Tokyo	Team
Gold medal – first place	2013 Sapporo	Team
Gold medal – first place	2014 Tokyo	Team
Gold medal – first place	2016 Bangkok	Team
Silver medal – second place	2010 Ningbo	Team
Silver medal – second place	2011 Macau	Team
Silver medal – second place	2012 Ningbo	Team
Pan American Games
Gold medal – first place	2011 Guadalajara	Team
Silver medal – second place	2007 Rio de Janeiro	Team
Pan-American Cup
Gold medal – first place	2006 San Juan
Gold medal – first place	2011 Ciudad Juárez
South American Championship
Gold medal – first place	2005 La Paz
Gold medal – first place	2007 Santiago
Gold medal – first place	2011 Callao
Gold medal – first place	2013 Ica
Gold medal – first place	2015 Cartagena
Gold medal – first place	2019 Cajamarca
- Last updated: March 2026

Fabiana Marcelino Claudino (born 24 January 1985) is a former Brazilian volleyball player who specialized as a Middle blocker. She won a gold medal at the Beijing Olympics and captained Brazil to a second consecutive gold medal at the 2012 Olympics.

Claudino made her debut for the Brazilian national team against Croatia.

== Personal life ==
Claudino was born on 24 January 1985 in Belo Horizonte, Brazil.

== Early life ==
Claudino began playing volleyball in 2000 at Minas Tênis Clube. After one year, in 2011, she won the Junior World Championship.

== Career ==
Claudino was named Best Spiker at the 2006 World Grand Prix in Reggio Calabria, Italy, where Brazil claimed the gold medal for the sixth time at the annual competition. She represented her native country at the 2004 Summer Olympics in Athens, Greece.

Claudino was a part of the national team who won the gold medal at the 2011 Pan American Games held in Guadalajara, Mexico.

She played for Turkish professional club Fenerbahçe during the 2011–12 season.

Claudino won one of the Best Middle Blockers awards during the 2013 South American Championship. Her National Team won the Continental Championship qualifying to the 2013 World Grand Champions Cup and the 2014 World Championship.

Claudino won the bronze medal in the 2014 FIVB Club World Championship after her team defeated the Swiss club Voléro Zürich, 3–2.

Claudino played with her national team, winning the bronze at the 2014 World Championship when her team defeated Italy, 3–2, in the bronze medal match.

== Clubs ==
- (Brazil) MRV/Minas (2002–03)
- (Brazil) Rio Rexona/Ades (2003–09)
- (Brazil) Araçatuba Vôlei Futuro (2010–11)
- (Turkey) Fenerbahçe Universal (2011–12)
- (Brazil) SESI-SP (2012–16)
- (Brazil) Praia Clube (2016–19)
- (Japan) Saga Hisamitsu Springs (2019–20)
- (Brazil) Osasco São Cristóvão (2021–23)

== Awards ==
=== Individuals ===
- 2001 FIVB U17 World Championship – "Best Spiker"
- 2001 FIVB U17 World Championship – "Best Blocker"
- 2003 FIVB U20 world Championship – "Best Spiker"
- 2005 FIVB World Grand Champions Cup – "Best Blocker"
- 2006 FIVB World Grand Prix – "Best Spiker"
- 2006 Pan-American Cup – "Best Blocker"
- 2008 Final Four Cup – "Best Blocker"
- 2009 Montreux Volley Masters – "Most Valuable Player"
- 2009 FIVB World Grand Prix – "Best Blocker"
- 2011 South American Championship – "Best Blocker"
- 2012 Summer Olympics – "Best Blocker"
- 2013 South American Championship – "Best Middle Blocker"
- 2013 FIVB Grand Champions Cup – "Most Valuable Player
- 2014 South American Club Championship – "Most Valuable Player"
- 2014 FIVB World Grand Prix – "Best Middle Blocker"
- 2017 South American Club Championship – "Best Middle Blocker"
- 2019 South American Club Championship – "Best Middle Blocker"

=== Clubs ===
- 2002–03 Brazilian Superliga – Runner-up, with MRV/Minas
- 2003–04 Brazilian Superliga – Runner-up, with MRV/Minas
- 2004–05 Brazilian Superliga – Runner-up, with Rexona/Ades
- 2005–06 Brazilian Superliga – Champion, with Rexona/Ades
- 2006–07 Brazilian Superliga – Champion, with Rexona/Ades
- 2007–08 Brazilian Superliga – Champion, with Rexona/Ades
- 2008–09 Brazilian Superliga – Champion, with Rexona/Ades
- 2009–10 Brazilian Superliga – Runner-up, with Rexona/Ades
- 2010–11 Brazilian Superliga – Champion, with Rexona/Ades
- 2013–14 Brazilian Superliga – Runner-up, with SESI-SP
- 2017–18 Brazilian Superliga – Champion, with Dentil/Praia Clube
- 2018–19 Brazilian Superliga – Runner-up, with Dentil/Praia Clube
- 2006 Women's Top Volley International – Champion, with Rexona/Ades
- 2009 Women's Top Volley International – Champion, with Rexona/Ades
- 2011–12 CEV Champions League – Champion, with Fenerbahçe Universal
- 2014 South American Club Championship - Champion, with SESI-SP
- 2017 South American Club Championship – Runner-up, with Dentil/Praia Clube
- 2019 South American Club Championship – Runner-up, with Dentil/Praia Clube
- 2014 FIVB Club World Championship - Bronze medal, with SESI-SP

Awards
Preceded by (Cuba) Rosir Calderón	Best Spiker of FIVB World Grand Prix; 2006	Succeeded by (Italy) Taismary Agüero
Preceded by (Brazil) Walewska Oliveira	Best Blocker of FIVB World Grand Prix; 2009	Succeeded by (United States) Foluke Akinradewo
Preceded by (Japan) Erika Araki	Best Blocker of Olympic Games; 2012	Succeeded by -
Preceded by (Italy) Simona Gioli	Most Valuable Player of FIVB World Grand Champions Cup; 2013	Succeeded by (China) Zhu Ting
Preceded by (Brazil) Thaísa Menezes and (Serbia) Milena Rašić	Best Middle Blocker of FIVB World Grand Prix; 2014 (with (Russia) Irina Fetisova)	Succeeded by (Brazil) Juciely Barreto and (United States) Christa Harmotto
