= Ivna Marra =

Brazilian volleyball player (born 1990)

Personal information
- Full name: Ivna Franco Marra
- Nationality: Brazilian
- Born: 25 January 1990 (age 36) Coromandel, Minas Gerais
- Height: 1.85 m (6 ft 1 in)
- Weight: 76 kg (168 lb)
- Spike: 305 cm (120 in)
- Block: 294 cm (116 in)

Volleyball information
- Position: Opposite spiker
- Current club: Victorina Himeji

National team
- Years: Team
- 2015: Brazil
Honours
Women's volleyball
Representing Brazil
World Grand Prix
Bronze medal – third place	2015 Omaha	Team

Ivna Franco Marra (born 25 January 1990) is a Brazilian female volleyball player. With her club Sollys Nestlé Osasco she competed at the 2011 FIVB Volleyball Women's Club World Championship and with SESI-SP at the 2014 FIVB Volleyball Women's Club World Championship.

== Clubs ==
- (Brazil) Minas Tênis Clube (2007–2011)
- (Brazil) Sollys Osasco (2011–2013
- (Brazil) SESI-SP (2013–2014)
- (Brazil) Molico Osasco (2014–2016)
- (France) Le Canneto (2016–2017)
- (Brazil) EC Pinheiros (2017–2018)
- (Brazil) Balneário Camboriú (2018–2019)
- (Japan) Victorina Himeji (2019–)

== Awards ==
=== Individuals ===
- 2008 U20 South American Championship – "Most valuable player"
- 2008 U20 South American Championship – "Best receiver"
- 2011 South American Club Championship – "Best spiker"
- 2014 South American Club Championship – "Best opposite spiker"

=== Clubs ===
- 2011–12 Brazilian Superliga – Champion, with Sollys Osasco
- 2012–13 Brazilian Superliga – Runner-up, with Sollys Osasco
- 2013–14 Brazilian Superliga – Runner-up, with SESI-SP
- 2014–15 Brazilian Superliga – Runner-up, with Molico Osasco
- 2016–17 French League – Runner-up, with Le Cannet
- 2011 South American Club Championship – Champion, with Sollys Osasco
- 2014 South American Club Championship – Champion, with SESI-SP
- 2011 FIVB Club World Championship – Bronze medal, with Sollys Osasco
- 2012 FIVB Club World Championship – Champion, with Sollys Osasco
- 2014 FIVB Club World Championship – Bronze medal, with SESI-SP
