= Neneca (volleyball) =

Brazilian volleyball player (born 1988)

Alessandra Januario Dos Santos

Personal information
- Nationality: Brazilian
- Born: 13 April 1988 (age 38)
- Height: 174 cm (5 ft 9 in)
- Weight: 60 kg (132 lb)

Career
| Years | Teams |
|---|---|
| 2014 | SESI-SP |

Alessandra Januario Dos Santos (born 13 April 1988), known as Neneca, is a Brazilian volleyball player.

With her club SESI-SP she competed at the 2014 FIVB Volleyball Women's Club World Championship.
