= Dani Lins =

Brazilian volleyball player

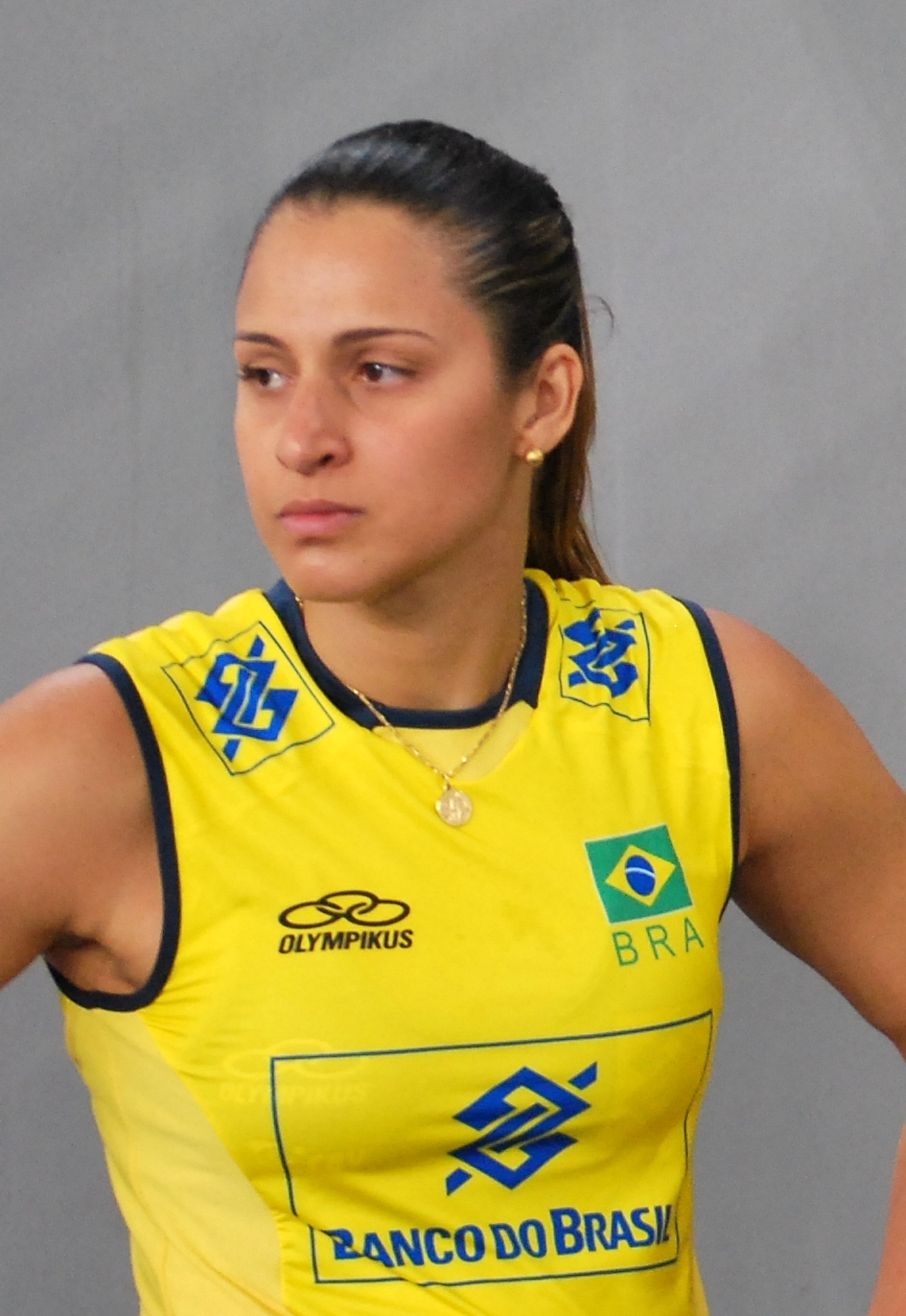

Personal information
- Full name: Danielle Rodrigues Lins
- Born: 5 January 1985 (age 41); Recife, Brazil
- Height: 1.81 m (5 ft 11 in)
- Weight: 68 kg (150 lb)
- Spike: 290 cm (114 in)
- Block: 276 cm (109 in)

Volleyball information
- Position: Setter
- Current club: (Brazil) Vôlei Bauru
- Number: 3

Career
Years	Teams
2000–2005; 2005–2006; 2006–2011; 2011–2014; 2014–2017; 2018–2019; 2019–	(Brazil) Finasa Osasco (Brazil) Esporte Clube Pinheiros (Brazil) Rio de Janeiro (Brazil) SESI-SP (Brazil) Molico Osasco (Brazil) Hinode Barueri (Brazil) Vôlei Bauru

National team
2009–2021	Brazil
Honours
Representing Brazil
Olympic Games
Gold medal – first place	2012 London	Team
World Championship
Silver medal – second place	2010 Japan	Team
Bronze medal – third place	2014 Italy	Team
World Grand Champions Cup
Silver medal – second place	2009 Japan
World Grand Prix
Gold medal – first place	2009 Tokyo	Team
Gold medal – first place	2013 Sapporo	Team
Gold medal – first place	2014 Tokyo	Team
Gold medal – first place	2016 Bangkok	Team
Silver medal – second place	2010 Ningbo	Team
Silver medal – second place	2011 Macau	Team
Silver medal – second place	2012 Ningbo	Team
Bronze medal – third place	2015 Omaha	Team
Pan American Games
Gold medal – first place	2011 Guadalajara	Team
Pan-American Cup
Gold medal – first place	2011 Ciudad Juárez
South American Championship
Gold medal – first place	2009 Porto Alegre
Gold medal – first place	2011 Callao
Gold medal – first place	2013 Ica
Gold medal – first place	2015 Cartagena
FIVB Nations League
Silver medal – second place	2021 Rimini	Team

Danielle Rodrigues Lins (born 5 January 1985), better known as Dani Lins, is a Brazilian volleyball player who plays as a setter. She represented her country at the FIVB World Grand Prix 2009 in Tokyo, Japan, where they won the gold medal. In 2012, she became an Olympic champion at the 2012 Summer Olympics.

== Career ==
Born in Recife, Dani Lins defended for Finasa/Osasco from 2003 to 2005, moving to Pinheiros/Blue Life for the 2005–06 season, then joining Unilever in 2006.

Lins won the bronze medal in the 2014 FIVB Club World Championship after her team defeated the Swiss club Voléro Zürich, 3–2.

=== National team ===
Dani Lins helped her country finish in fourth place at the Pan American Games and in the Women's Pan-American Volleyball Cup, both played in 2003. Brazilian national team head coach Zé Roberto chose her on 1 August 2009, to replace Fofão as the team captain. She won the FIVB World Grand Prix in 2009.

Lins was part of the national team who won the gold medal at the 2011 Pan American Games held in Guadalajara, Mexico. She also won the Best Setter award.

In 2012 Dani won the gold medal at the 2012 Olympic Games.

Lins played with her national team, winning the bronze at the 2014 World Championship when her team defeated Italy 3–2 in the bronze medal match.

== Awards ==
=== Individuals ===
- 2009 South American Club Championship – "Best Server"
- 2009 South American Championship – "Best Setter"
- 2011 World Grand Prix – "Best Setter"
- 2011 Pan American Games – "Best Setter"
- 2013 Montreux Volley Masters – "Best Setter"
- 2014 South American Club Championship – "Best Setter"
- 2014 FIVB World Grand Prix – "Best Setter"
- 2015 South American Club Championship – "Best Setter"

=== Clubs ===
- 2014 FIVB Club World Championship – Bronze medal, with SESI-SP
- 2014 South American Club Championship – Champion, with SESI-SP
- 2015 South American Club Championship – Runner-up, with Molico/Osasco
- 2004–05 Brazilian Superliga – Champion, with Finasa/Osasco
- 2006–07 Brazilian Superliga – Champion, with Rexona/Ades
- 2007–08 Brazilian Superliga – Champion, with Rexona/Ades
- 2008–09 Brazilian Superliga – Champion, with Rexona/Ades
- 2009–10 Brazilian Superliga – Runner up, with Rexona/Ades
- 2010–11 Brazilian Superliga – Champion, with Unilever Vôlei
- 2013–14 Brazilian Superliga – Runner up, with SESI-SP
- 2016–17 Brazilian Superliga – Runner up, with Vôlei Nestlé

Awards
Preceded by (Brazil) Helia Souza	Best Setter of South American Championship; 2009	Succeeded by (Peru) Elena Keldibekova
Preceded by (United States) Alisha Glass (United States) Alisha Glass	Best Setter of FIVB World Grand Prix; 2011; 2014	Succeeded by (Thailand) Nootsara Tomkom (United States) Molly Kreklow
