= Fabiana Berto =

Brazilian volleyball player (born 1976)

Personal information
- Full name: Fabiana Berto Belarmino
- Born: 23 January 1976 (age 50); São Paulo, Brazil
- Height: 1.78 m (5 ft 10 in)
- Weight: 61 kg (134 lb)
- Spike: 286 cm (113 in)
- Block: 274 cm (108 in)

Volleyball information
- Position: Setter

National team
2001–2003	Brazil
Honours
Women's volleyball
Representing Brazil
South American Championship
Gold medal – first place	2001 Marón	Team

Fabiana Berto (born 23 January 1976) is a retired Brazilian female volleyball player, who played as a setter.

She was part of the Brazil women's national volleyball team at the 2001 FIVB World Grand Prix and 2002 FIVB Volleyball Women's World Championship in Germany. On club level she played with Club Atlético Estudiantes de Paraná.

== Clubs ==
- Club Atlético Estudiantes de Paraná (2002)
- Esporte Clube Pinheiros (2008–09)
