= Suelle Oliveira =

Brazilian volleyball player (born 1983)

Personal information
- Full name: Suelle do Prado Oliveira
- Nationality: Brazilian
- Born: April 29, 1987 (age 39); Curitiba, Paraná
- Height: 1.87 m (6 ft 2 in)
- Weight: 72 kg (159 lb)
- Spike: 291 cm (115 in)
- Block: 278 cm (109 in)

Volleyball information
- Position: Wing spiker
- Current team: Victorina Voley

National team
2005–2015	Brazil
Honours
Women's volleyball
Representing Brazil
World Grand Prix
Bronze medal – third place	2015 Omaha	Team
Pan-American Cup
Gold medal – first place	2011 Ciudad Juárez	Team
Silver medal – second place	2008 Tijuana-Mexicali	Team
Bronze medal – third place	2005 Santo Domingo	Team

Suelle Oliveira (born 29 April 1987) is a Brazilian volleyball player and a member of the Brazilian team.

== Career ==
She was part of the national team at the 2015 FIVB World Grand Prix.

She participated at the 2014 FIVB Volleyball Women's Club World Championship, with her club SESI-SP.

== Clubs ==
- (Brazil) Paraná Vôlei (2002–2004)
- (Brazil) São Caetano (2004–2007)
- (Brazil) Osasco Vôlei (2007–2009)
- (Brazil) AD Brusque (2009–2010)
- (Brazil) Rio de Janeiro (2010–2011)
- (Brazil) Praia Clube (2011–2012)
- (Brazil) SESI São Paulo (2012–2015)
- (Brazil) Molico Osasco (2015–2016)
- (Brazil) Hinode Barueri (2016–2018)
- (Japan) Victorina Himeji (2018–2019)
- (Brazil) SESI Bauru (2020–2021)

== Awards ==
=== Individuals ===
- 2014 FIVB Club World Championship – "Best outside spiker"

=== Clubs ===
- 2007–08 Brazilian Superliga – Runner-up, with Osasco Vôlei
- 2008–09 Brazilian Superliga – Runner-up, with Osasco Vôlei
- 2010–11 Brazilian Superliga – Champion, with Unilever Vôlei
- 2013–14 Brazilian Superliga – Runner-up, with SESI São Paulo
- 2018–19 V.Challenge League – Champion, with Victorina Himeji
- 2009 South American Club Championship – Champion, with Osasco Vôlei
- 2014 South American Club Championship – Champion, with SESI São Paulo
- 2014 FIVB Club World Championship – Bronze medal, with SESI São Paulo
