= Yevgeniya Startseva =

Russian volleyball player (born 1989)

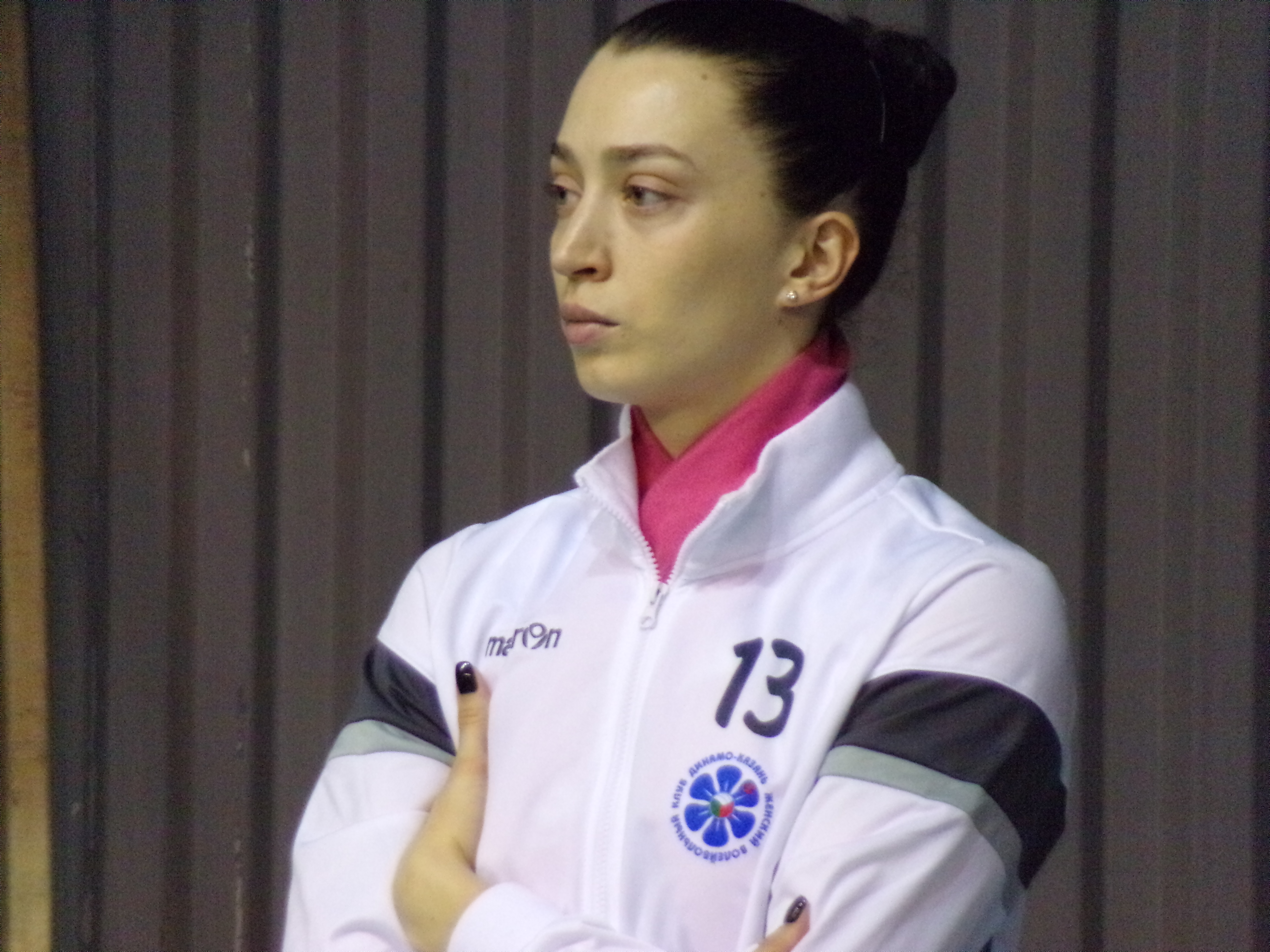

Personal information
- Full name: Yevgeniya Alexandrovna Startseva
- Nationality: Russia
- Born: 12 February 1989 (age 37) Chelyabinsk, Russia
- Height: 1.85 m (6 ft 1 in)
- Weight: 68 kg (150 lb)

Volleyball information
- Current club: Dynamo Moscow

National team
- Years: Team
- 2007-: Russia
Honours
Women's volleyball
Representing Russia
World Championship
Gold medal – first place	2010 Japan	Team
World Cup
Bronze medal – third place	2019 Japan
Grand Prix
Silver medal – second place	2009 Tokyo	Team
Bronze medal – third place	2014 Japan	Team
European Championship
Gold medal – first place	2015 Netherlands/Belgium	Team

Yevgeniya Aleksandrovna Startseva (Russian: Евге́ния Алекса́ндровна Ста́рцева; born 12 February 1989) is a volleyball player from Russia. She was a member of the national team that won the gold medal at the 2010 World Championship. She represented Russia at the 2012 Olympics.

== Career ==
Startseva won a 2014 FIVB Club World Championship gold medal playing with the Russian club Dinamo Kazan, who defeated the Brazilian team Molico Osasco 3–0 in the championship match.

=== National team ===
- 2009 FIVB World Grand Prix – Silver medal (with Russia)
- 2010 FIVB World Championship – Gold medal (with Russia)
- 2014 FIVB World Grand Prix – Bronze medal (with Russia)
- 2015 European Championship – Gold medal (with Russia)
- 2019 World Cup - Bronze medal (with Russia)

== Clubs ==
- (Russia) Avtodor-Metar (2004–2010)
- (Russia) Dinamo Krasnodar (2010-2012)
- (Russia) Dinamo Kazan (2012-2021)
- (Russia) Dynamo Moscow (2022–Present)

=== Awards ===
- Volleyball at the 2012 Summer Olympics – Women's tournament - Best setter
- 2014 FIVB Club World Championship - Champion, with Dinamo Kazan
- 2016 Russian Cup – Champion, with Dinamo Kazan
- 2016–17 CEV Cup – Champion, with Dinamo Kazan
- 2016–17 Russian Championship – Runner-Up, with Dinamo Kazan

Awards
Preceded by (Brazil) Hélia Souza	Best Setter of Olympic Games; 2012	Succeeded by (United States) Alisha Glass
