= Maria Borodakova =

Russian volleyball player (born 1986)

Personal information
- Born: 8 March 1986 (age 40) Gorky, Soviet Union
- Height: 1.90 m (6 ft 3 in)
Medal record
Women's volleyball
Representing Russia
World Championship
Gold medal – first place	2006 Japan	Team
Gold medal – first place	2010 Japan	Team
FIVB World Grand Prix
Silver medal – second place	2006 Reggio Calabria	Team
Silver medal – second place	2009 Tokyo	Team
European Championship
Bronze medal – third place	2005 Zagreb-Pula	Team
Bronze medal – third place	2007 Charleroi-Luxembourg	Team

Maria Borodakova (born 8 March 1986) is a volleyball player from Russia, playing as a middle-blocker. She was a member of the Women's National Team that won the gold medal at the 2006 FIVB Women's World Championship and the 2010 FIVB Women's World Championship.

== Career ==
Borodakova won the bronze medal and the "Best Best Blocker" award at the 2011-12 CEV Champions League, after her Russian team Dinamo Kazan defeated Italian MC-Carnaghi Villa Cortese.

Borodakova won the 2014 FIVB Club World Championship gold medal, playing with the Russian club Dinamo Kazan that defeated 3-0 the Brazilian Molico Osasco in the championship match.

== Awards ==
=== Individuals ===
- 2011–12 CEV Champions League "Best Blocker"

=== Clubs ===
- 2011-12 CEV Champions League - Bronze medal, with Dinamo Kazan
- 2014 FIVB Club World Championship - Champion, with Dinamo Kazan
