= Esporte Clube Pinheiros (women's volleyball) =

Brazilian women's volleyball team

E.C. Pinheiros
- Full name: Esporte Clube Pinheiros São Paulo (E.C.P.S.P.)
- Short name: Esporte Clube Pinheiros (E.C.P.)
- Manager: Wagner Coppini (Wagão)
- League: Brazilian Superliga
- 2017–18: 7th
- Website: Club home page

Uniforms
Home	Away

Esporte Clube Pinheiros, abbreviated as E.C. Pinheiros, is the professional women's volleyball team from the multi-sports club from the same name, based in São Paulo, São Paulo (state), Brazil.

== Current squad ==
Squad for the season 2018–2019

Team roster - season 2018–2019
Number	Player	Position	Height (m)	Birth date
1	(Brazil) Roberta Silva	Middle Blocker	1.87	June 6, 1984 (age 41)
2	(Brazil) Francine Tomazoni	Setter	1.82	November 5, 1991 (age 34)
3	(Brazil) Amanda Rodrigues	Setter	1.82	July 16, 1998 (age 27)
4	(Brazil) Lorena Viezel	Middle Blocker	1.90	July 21, 1999 (age 26)
5	(Brazil) Natália Danielski	Outside Hitter	1.81	December 5, 1999 (age 26)
6	(Brazil) Aline Silva	Middle Blocker	1.93	January 24, 1986 (age 40)
7	(Brazil) Lorrayna da Silva	Opposite	1.86	June 19, 1999 (age 26)
8	(United States) Kelsie Payne	Middle Blocker	1.93	November 29, 1990 (age 35)
9	(Brazil) Lyara Medeiros	Setter	1.84	September 19, 1996 (age 29)
10	(Brazil) Mariana Cassemiro	Outside Hitter	1.85	March 27, 1987 (age 39)
11	(Brazil) Crarisse Peixoto	Outside Hitter	1.80	January 3, 1987 (age 39)
12	(Cuba) Yusleyni Herrera	Outside Hitter	1.79	March 12, 1984 (age 42)
13	(Brazil) Leticia Gomes	Libero	1.60	February 29, 1996 (age 30)
14	(Brazil) Juliana Perdigão	Libero	1.61	April 5, 1991 (age 35)
15	(Brazil) Camila Monteiro	Middle Blocker	1.85	January 17, 1988 (age 38)
16	(Brazil) Pietra Silva	Outside Hitter	1.85	May 4, 1998 (age 28)

Name	Position
Milka da Silva	Middle-Blocker
Bruna Rocha Costa	Setter
Bruna Marques	Opposite
Maira Cipriano	Wing-Spiker
Lana Conceição	Wing-Spiker
Lays de Freitas	Middle-Blocker
Mariana Cassemiro	Wing-Spiker
Roberta Gomes	Middle-Blocker
Letícia Hemelly Gomes	Libero
Diana Xavier	Setter
Ivna Marra	Opposite
Vanessa Janke	Wing-Spiker
Juliana Paes Filippelli	Libero

2016–2017 Team
Name	Position
Milka da Silva	Middle-Blocker
Bruna Rocha Costa	Setter
Adriani Vilvert Joaquim	Middle-Blocker
Maira Cipriano	Wing-Spiker
Lana Conceição	Wing-Spiker
Lays de Freitas	Middle-Blocker
Emilce Sosa	Middle-Blocker
Juliana Nogueira	Wing-Spiker
Letícia Hemelly Gomes	Libero
Bárbara Bruch	Opposite
Ananda Marinho	Setter
Vanessa Janke	Wing-Spiker
Juliana Paes Filippelli	Libero
Marcella Antunes	Wing-Spiker
Tanya Acosta	Opposite

2008–2009 Team
Name	Position
Fabiana Berto	Setter
Fernanda Garay	Setter
Fernanda Tome	Wing-Spiker
Patricia Bianchi	Wing-Spiker
Tandara Caixeta	Wing-Spiker
Thais Custodio	Wing-Spiker
Angela de Moraes	Middle-Blocker
Daniele de Oliveira	Middle-Blocker
Ligia Ronco	Middle-Blocker
Bruna Guido	Middle-Blocker
Arianne de Oliveira	Opposite
Arlene Xavier	Libero

== Notable players ==
- Macris Carneiro
- Ana Carolina da Silva
- Arlene Xavier
- Danielle Lins
- Fernanda Ferreira
- Fernanda Garay
- Léia Silva
- Tandara Caixeta
- Rosamaria Montibeller
- Jaqueline Carvalho
