= Dayse Figueiredo =

Brazilian volleyball player (born 1984)

Personal information
- Nationality: Brazilian
- Born: 27 June 1984 (age 42)
- Height: 183 cm (6 ft 0 in)
- Weight: 72 kg (159 lb)
- Spike: 304 cm (120 in)
- Block: 291 cm (115 in)

Career
Years	Teams
2014	SESI-SP

National team
2003-2014	Brazil

Dayse Figueiredo (born 27 June 1984) is a Brazilian female volleyball player.

With her club SESI-SP she competed at the 2014 FIVB Volleyball Women's Club World Championship.
