= Anna Melnikova (volleyball) =

Russian volleyball player (born 1995)

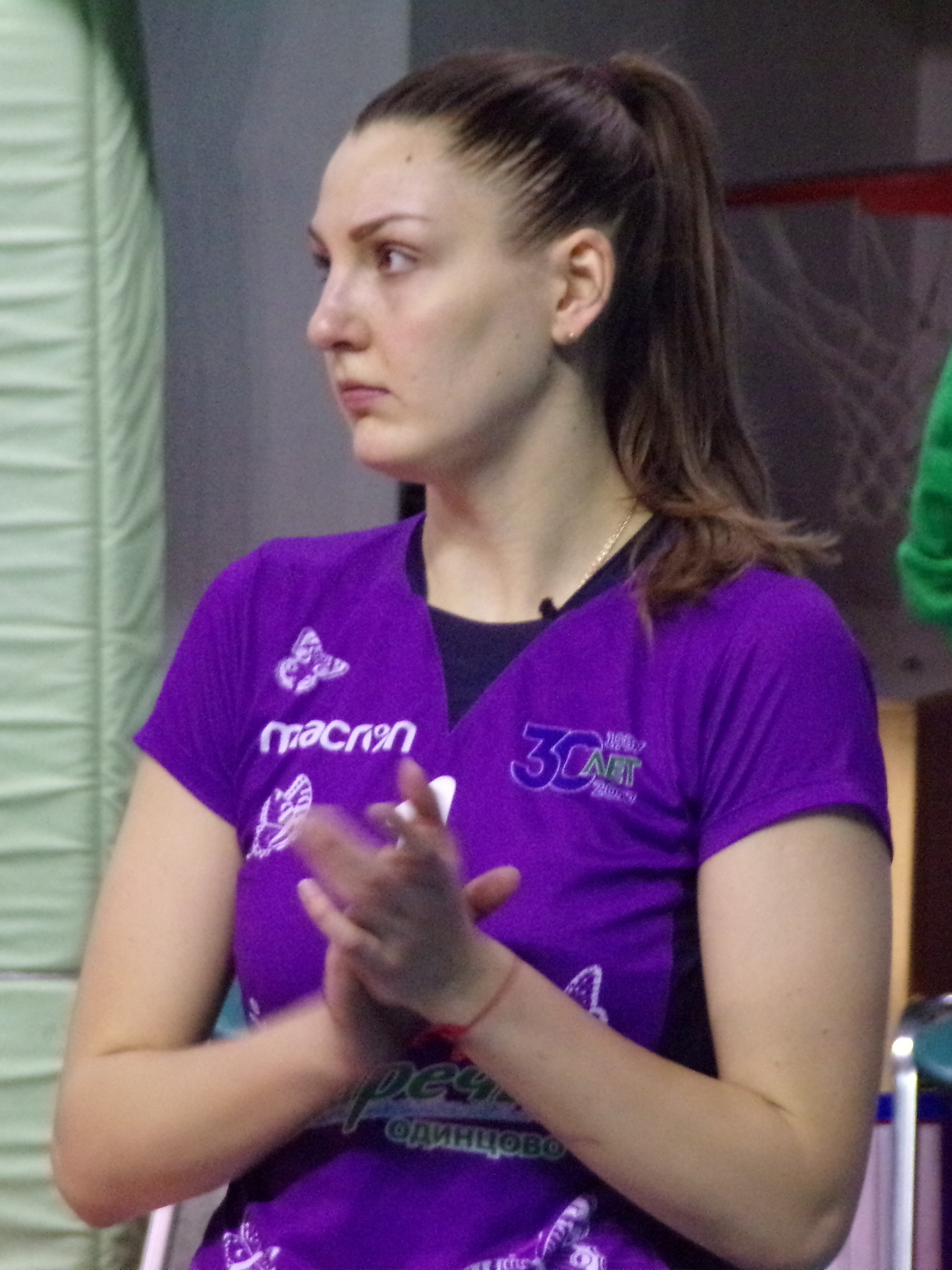

Personal information
- Nationality: Russian
- Born: 13 October 1995 (age 31)
- Height: 192 cm (6 ft 4 in)
- Weight: 87 kg (192 lb)
- Spike: 305 cm (120 in)
- Block: 295 cm (116 in)

Volleyball information
- Current club: Leningradka Saint Petersburg
- Number: 23

Career
- Years: Team
- 2013–2016: Dinamo Kazan

Anna Melnikova (born 13 October 1995) is a Russian female volleyball player.

With her club Dinamo Kazan she competed at the 2014 FIVB Volleyball Women's Club World Championship.
