= 2014 Women's South American Volleyball Club Championship =

Tournament details
- Host country: Brazil
- Dates: 5–9 February 2014
- Teams: 8
- Venue: 1 (in São Paulo host cities)

Final positions
- Champions: (Brazil) SESI-SP (1st title)

Tournament awards
- MVP: Fabiana (BRA)

The 2014 Women's South American Volleyball Club Championship was the sixth official edition of the women's volleyball tournament, played by eight teams from 5 to 9 February 2014 in São Paulo, Brazil.

SESI São Paulo won the 2014 edition qualifying for the 2014 Club World Championship, defeating in the finale hosts Molico/Osasco.

== Competing clubs ==
Teams were seeded in two pools of four according to how the representatives of their countries finished in the 2013 edition.

Pool A	Pool B
(Brazil) Molico/Osasco (Argentina) Boca Juniors (Paraguay) Universidad Metropolitana (Bolivia) Universidad San Francísco Xavier	(Brazil) SESI São Paulo (Peru) LNSV (*); ADO Chile (*) (Colombia) Politécnico Colombiano Jaime Isaza Cadavid

(*) Both Peru and Chile played the tournament with their U23 national teams, Perú played under the name of LNSV, their national volleyball league and Chile played under the name ADO (Asociación de Deportistas Olímpicos, Spanish for Olympic Athletes Association). Both due to a controversial change in the date of the tournament.

== First round ==
=== Pool A ===
Pos	Team	Pld	W	L	Pts	SW	SL	SR	SPW	SPL	SPR
1	(Brazil) Molico/Osasco	3	3	0	9	9	0	MAX	225	107	2.103
2	(Argentina) Boca Juniors	3	2	1	6	6	3	2.000	205	162	1.265
3	(Bolivia) Universidad San Francísco Xavier	3	1	2	2	3	8	0.375	179	240	0.746
4	(Paraguay) Universidad Metropolitana	3	0	3	1	2	9	0.222	158	258	0.612

Date		Score		Set 1	Set 2	Set 3	Set 4	Set 5	Total
5 Feb	Boca Juniors (Argentina)	3–0	(Paraguay) Universidad Metropolitana	25–15	25–15	25–12			75–42
5 Feb	Molico/Osasco (Brazil)	3–0	(Bolivia) Universidad San Francísco Xavier	25–13	25–5	25–8			75–26
6 Feb	Universidad San Francísco Xavier (Bolivia)	0–3	(Argentina) Boca Juniors	16–25	18–25	11–25			45–75
6 Feb	Molico/Osasco (Brazil)	3–0	(Paraguay) Universidad Metropolitana	25–8	25–6	25–12			75–26
7 Feb	Universidad Metropolitana (Paraguay)	2–3	(Bolivia) Universidad San Francísco Xavier	25–20	25–23	16–25	15–25	9–15	90–108
7 Feb	Molico/Osasco (Brazil)	3–0	(Argentina) Boca Juniors	25–17	25–19	25–19			75–55

=== Pool B ===
Pos	Team	Pld	W	L	Pts	SW	SL	SR	SPW	SPL	SPR
1	(Brazil) SESI São Paulo	3	3	0	9	9	0	MAX	225	111	2.027
2	(Peru) LNSV	3	2	1	6	6	3	2.000	204	175	1.166
3	ADO Chile	3	1	2	3	3	6	0.500	183	224	0.817
4	(Colombia) Politécnico Colombiano Jaime Isaza Cadavid	3	0	3	0	0	6	0.000	145	247	0.587

Date		Score		Set 1	Set 2	Set 3	Set 4	Set 5	Total
5 Feb	LNSV (Peru)	3–0	ADO Chile	25–17	25–14	25–22			75–53
5 Feb	SESI São Paulo (Brazil)	3–0	(Colombia) Politécnico Colombiano Jaime Isaza Cadavid	25–9	25–9	25–6			75–24
6 Feb	Politécnico Colombiano Jaime Isaza Cadavid (Colombia)	0–3	(Peru) LNSV	12–25	17–25	18–25			47–75
6 Feb	SESI São Paulo (Brazil)	3–0	ADO Chile	25–11	25-11	25–11			75–33
7 Feb	ADO Chile	3–1	(Colombia) Politécnico Colombiano Jaime Isaza Cadavid	22–25	25–19	25–16	25–14		97–74
7 Feb	SESI São Paulo (Brazil)	3–0	(Peru) LNSV	25-18	25-18	25-18			75-54

== Final round ==
=== Bracket ===
Semifinals
February 08 – São Paulo
(Brazil) SESI São Paulo	3
(Argentina) Boca Juniors	0
February 08 – São Paulo
(Peru) LNSV	0
(Brazil) Molico/Osasco	3

Final
February 09 – São Paulo
(Brazil) SESI São Paulo	3
(Brazil) Molico/Osasco	0
3rd place
February 09 – São Paulo
(Peru) LNSV	0
(Argentina) Boca Juniors	3

== Final standing ==
Rank	Team
1st place, gold medalist(s)	(Brazil) SESI São Paulo
2nd place, silver medalist(s)	(Brazil) Molico/Osasco
3rd place, bronze medalist(s)	(Argentina) Boca Juniors
4	(Peru) LNSV
5	ADO Chile
6	(Bolivia) Universidad San Francísco Xavier
7	(Colombia) Politécnico Colombiano Jaime Isaza Cadavid
8	(Paraguay) Universidad Metropolitana

Qualified for the 2014 FIVB Women's Club World Championship

2014 Women's South American Volleyball Club Champions

1st title

== All-Star team ==
- Most valuable player
  - (Brazil) Fabiana Claudino (SESI SP)
- Best Opposite
  - (Brazil) Ivna Marra (SESI SP)
- Best Outside Hitters
  - (Brazil) Dayse Figueiredo (SESI SP)
  - (Peru) Ángela Leyva (LNSV Club)
- Best setter
  - (Brazil) Dani Lins (SESI SP)
- Best Middle Blockers
  - (Brazil) Adenizia da Silva (Molico/Osasco)
  - (Brazil) Thaisa Menezes (Molico/Osasco)
- Best libero
  - (Brazil) Suelen Pinto (SESI SP)

== Controversy ==
Due to the FIVB's decision to host the 2014 Club World Championship in May 2014 instead of October as the past editions, the CSV changed the date of the South American Club Championship to February, a month where the South American volleyball leagues have not yet declared a champion to participate in the tournament. Most of the countries decided to prepare a qualifier, such as the Brazilian Women's Volleyball Superliga which qualified SESI-SP to the tournament while other countries like Perú decided to send a national team under the name of their national volleyball league.

As the official Spanish name for the tournament is "South American Champion Clubs Championship, most countries raised severe opinions about the top three countries from last years edition not participating with a champion club.
