= 2009 FIVB Volleyball World Grand Prix =

International women's volleyball tournament

2009 FIVB World Grand Prix
Tournament details
- Host country: Japan (Final)
- Dates: 31 July – 23 August
- Teams: 12
- Venue: 1 (in 1 host city)

Final positions
- Champions: Brazil (8th title)
- Runners-up: Russia
- Third place: Germany
- Fourth place: Netherlands

Tournament awards
- MVP: (Brazil) Sheilla Castro

The FIVB World Grand Prix 2009 is a women's volleyball tournament that was played by 12 countries from 31 July to 23 August 2009. The finals were held at the Tokyo Metropolitan Gymnasium in Tokyo, Japan. Brazil, United States, Dominican Republic and Puerto Rico qualified for the tournament at the 2008 Women's Pan-American Cup in Mexicali and Tijuana, Mexico.

== Competing nations ==
The following national teams qualified:

Europe	America	Asia
Poland; Netherlands; Russia; Germany	Brazil; Puerto Rico; Dominican Republic; United States	China; Japan; South Korea; Thailand

== Calendar ==
Week 1 31 July – 2 August 2009
Group A: Rio de Janeiro, Brazil	Group B: Kielce, Poland	Group C: Ningbo, China
Brazil; United States; Germany; Puerto Rico	Poland; Japan; Netherlands; Thailand	China; Russia; Dominican Republic; South Korea
Week 2 7–9 August 2009
Group D: Miaoli, Taiwan	Group E: Macau	Group F: Osaka, Japan
United States; Netherlands; Dominican Republic; Germany	China; Brazil; Poland; Thailand	Japan; South Korea; Russia; Puerto Rico
Week 3 14–16 August 2009
Group G: Hong Kong	Group H: Mokpo, South Korea	Group I: Bangkok, Thailand
China; Poland; Netherlands; Dominican Republic	Brazil; Japan; Germany; South Korea	Thailand; United States; Russia; Puerto Rico
Week 4 Final Round 19–23 August 2009
Tokyo, Japan
Top five teams Brazil; China; Netherlands; Germany; Russia and Japan as host

== Preliminary round ==
=== Ranking ===
The host Japan and top five teams in the preliminary round advance to the final round.

Pos	Team	Pld	W	L	Pts	SW	SL	SR	SPW	SPL	SPR	Qualification
1	Brazil	9	9	0	18	27	7	3.857	793	613	1.294	Final round
2	Netherlands	9	7	2	16	25	7	3.571	772	654	1.180	Final round
3	China	9	7	2	16	25	13	1.923	871	760	1.146	Final round
4	Russia	9	6	3	15	22	15	1.467	832	767	1.085	Final round
5	Japan (Note: Qualified as hosts) (H)	9	5	4	14	18	16	1.125	740	700	1.057	Final round
6	Germany	9	5	4	14	20	15	1.333	748	729	1.026	Final round
7	Poland	9	4	5	13	17	19	0.895	749	778	0.963	
8	Thailand	9	4	5	13	15	21	0.714	724	825	0.878	
9	United States	9	3	6	12	14	22	0.636	752	791	0.951	
10	Puerto Rico	9	2	7	11	9	25	0.360	685	791	0.866	
11	Dominican Republic	9	1	8	10	10	26	0.385	717	830	0.864	
12	South Korea	9	1	8	10	10	26	0.385	697	842	0.828	

(H) Host

=== First round ===
==== Group A ====
Date		Score		Set 1	Set 2	Set 3	Set 4	Set 5	Total	Report
31 Jul	Brazil	3–0	Puerto Rico	25–22	25–17	25–17			75–56	P2 P3
31 Jul	Germany	3–0	United States	25–15	25–15	25–16			75–46	P2 P3
1 Aug	Brazil	3–0	Germany	25–12	25–19	25–16			75–47	P2 P3
1 Aug	Puerto Rico	2–3	United States	25–21	25–20	23–25	14–25	13–15	100–106	P2 P3
2 Aug	Brazil	3–0	United States	25–18	25–22	25–13			75–53	P2 P3
2 Aug	Puerto Rico	3–2	Germany	13–25	27–25	25–21	21–25	15–11	101–107	P2 P3

==== Group B ====
Date		Score		Set 1	Set 2	Set 3	Set 4	Set 5	Total	Report
31 Jul	Poland	2–3	Thailand	25–12	23–25	22–25	25–19	13–15	107–96	P2 P3
31 Jul	Japan	0–3	Netherlands	13–25	19–25	20–25			52–75	P2 P3
1 Aug	Poland	0–3	Netherlands	23–25	20–25	21–25			64–75	P2 P3
1 Aug	Thailand	3–2	Japan	19–25	25–20	25–18	20–25	15–11	104–101	P2 P3
2 Aug	Poland	3–0	Japan	25–20	26–24	27–25			78–69	P2 P3
2 Aug	Netherlands	3–1	Thailand	25–27	25–21	25–17	25–20		100–85	P2 P3

==== Group C ====
Date		Score		Set 1	Set 2	Set 3	Set 4	Set 5	Total	Report
31 Jul	Russia	3–0	South Korea	25–23	25–23	25–15			75–61	P2 P3
31 Jul	China	3–0	Dominican Republic	25–12	25–18	25–19			75–49	P2 P3
1 Aug	Dominican Republic	2–3	Russia	21–25	27–25	25–19	11–25	10–15	94–109	P2 P3
1 Aug	China	3–0	South Korea	25–15	25–21	25–14			75–50	P2 P3
2 Aug	South Korea	2–3	Dominican Republic	22–25	12–25	25–18	26–24	10–15	95–107	P2 P3
2 Aug	China	3–2	Russia	23–25	25–23	20–25	25–14	15–9	108–96	P2 P3

=== Second round ===
==== Group D ====
Date		Score		Set 1	Set 2	Set 3	Set 4	Set 5	Total	Report
7 Aug	United States	3–2	Dominican Republic	25–18	25–19	23–25	21–25	23–21	117–108	P2 P3
7 Aug	Netherlands	3–1	Germany	25–13	25–23	22–25	25–23		97–84	P2 P3
8 Aug	United States	2–3	Netherlands	25–12	22–25	16–25	25–21	13–15	101–98	P2 P3
8 Aug	Dominican Republic	0–3	Germany	16–25	17–25	20–25			53–75	P2 P3
9 Aug	Netherlands	3–0	Dominican Republic	25–19	25–15	25–18			75–52	P2 P3
9 Aug	Germany	3–0	United States	25–22	25–18	27–25			77–65	P2 P3

==== Group E ====
Date		Score		Set 1	Set 2	Set 3	Set 4	Set 5	Total	Report
7 Aug	Brazil	3–0	Thailand	25–14	25–17	25–11			75–42	P2 P3
7 Aug	China	3–2	Poland	25–19	25–27	24–26	25–14	15–12	114–98	P2 P3
8 Aug	Brazil	3–1	Poland	25–22	25–9	13–25	25–15		88–71	P2 P3
8 Aug	China	3–1	Thailand	25–27	25–19	25–17	25–19		100–82	P2 P3
9 Aug	Poland	3–0	Thailand	26–24	25–14	27–25			78–63	P2 P3
9 Aug	China	2–3	Brazil	21–25	20–25	25–19	25–22	12–15	103–106	P2 P3

==== Group F ====
Date		Score		Set 1	Set 2	Set 3	Set 4	Set 5	Total	Report
7 Aug	South Korea	2–3	Russia	25–23	20–25	18–25	27–25	13–15	103–113	P2 P3
7 Aug	Japan	3–0	Puerto Rico	25–22	25–21	25–17			75–60	P2 P3
8 Aug	Russia	1–3	Puerto Rico	17–25	22–25	25–22	26–28		90–100	P2 P3
8 Aug	Japan	3–1	South Korea	22–25	25–13	25–18	25–10		97–66	P2 P3
9 Aug	South Korea	3–2	Puerto Rico	25–18	25–18	24–26	22–25	15–13	111–100	P2 P3
9 Aug	Japan	3–1	Russia	20–25	25–19	25–15	25–21		95–80	P2 P3

=== Third round ===
==== Group G ====
Date		Score		Set 1	Set 2	Set 3	Set 4	Set 5	Total	Report
14 Aug	Poland	0–3	Netherlands	17–25	17–25	13–25			47–75	P2 P3
14 Aug	China	3–1	Dominican Republic	25–21	21–25	25–17	25–20		96–83	P2 P3
15 Aug	Dominican Republic	0–3	Netherlands	14–25	31–33	28–30			73–88	P2 P3
15 Aug	China	2–3	Poland	21–25	21–25	25–18	26–24	11–15	104–107	P2 P3
16 Aug	Dominican Republic	2–3	Poland	25–22	23–25	14–25	25–13	11–15	98–100	P2 P3
16 Aug	China	3–1	Netherlands	25–21	25–22	21–25	25–21		96–89	P2 P3

==== Group H ====
Date		Score		Set 1	Set 2	Set 3	Set 4	Set 5	Total	Report
14 Aug	South Korea	1–3	Germany	28–26	20–25	22–25	11–25		81–101	P2 P3
14 Aug	Japan	1–3	Brazil	12–25	19–25	25–15	13–25		69–90	P2 P3
15 Aug	Brazil	3–2	Germany	25–27	25–15	25–19	19–25	15–10	109–96	P2 P3
15 Aug	South Korea	0–3	Japan	13–25	20–25	22–25			55–75	P2 P3
16 Aug	Germany	2–3	Japan	25–23	14–25	18–25	25–21	10–15	92–109	P2 P3
16 Aug	South Korea	1–3	Brazil	27–25	15–25	15–25	19–25		76–100	P2 P3

==== Group I ====
Date		Score		Set 1	Set 2	Set 3	Set 4	Set 5	Total	Report
14 Aug	Thailand	3–0	Puerto Rico	27–25	30–28	25–13			82–66	P2 P3
14 Aug	United States	1–3	Russia	21–25	24–26	25–19	17–25		87–95	P2 P3
15 Aug	Russia	3–1	Thailand	25–18	24–26	25–11	25–12		99–67	P2 P3
15 Aug	Puerto Rico	0–3	United States	16–25	18–25	22–25			56–75	P2 P3
16 Aug	Thailand	3–2	United States	19–25	25–20	25–21	23–25	15–11	107–102	P2 P3
16 Aug	Puerto Rico	0–3	Russia	16–25	17–25	19–25			52–75	P2 P3

== Final round ==
- Venue– Tokyo Metropolitan Gymnasium, Tokyo

Date		Score		Set 1	Set 2	Set 3	Set 4	Set 5	Total	Report
19 Aug	Netherlands	3–2	China	18–25	25–22	25–22	24–26	15–13	107–108	P2 P3
19 Aug	Brazil	3–2	Russia	25–20	22–25	25–17	24–26	16–14	112–102	P2 P3
19 Aug	Japan	1–3	Germany	21–25	25–16	17–25	22–25		85–91	P2 P3
20 Aug	Netherlands	3–2	Germany	19–25	25–21	25–22	21–25	15–13	105–106	P2 P3
20 Aug	China	0–3	Brazil	21–25	20–25	29–31			70–81	P2 P3
20 Aug	Japan	1–3	Russia	17–25	23–25	29–27	14–25		83–102	P2 P3
21 Aug	China	1–3	Russia	29–27	16–25	19–25	23–25		87–102	P2 P3
21 Aug	Brazil	3–0	Germany	25–15	25–15	25–16			75–46	P2 P3
21 Aug	Japan	3–0	Netherlands	25–22	25–18	25–22			75–62	P2 P3
22 Aug	Germany	1–3	Russia	25–16	21–25	23–25	20–25		89–91	P2 P3
22 Aug	Brazil	3–1	Netherlands	25–22	18–25	25–20	25–16		93–83	P2 P3
22 Aug	Japan	0–3	China	20–25	23–25	17–25			60–75	P2 P3
23 Aug	Germany	3–1	China	25–14	23–25	25–21	25–14		98–74	P2 P3
23 Aug	Russia	3–0	Netherlands	25–20	25–23	25–21			75–64	P2 P3
23 Aug	Japan	1–3	Brazil	21–25	27–25	19–25	19–25		86–100	P2 P3

=== Final ranking ===
Pos	Team	Pld	W	L	Pts	SW	SL	SR	SPW	SPL	SPR
1	Brazil	5	5	0	10	15	4	3.750	461	387	1.191
2	Russia	5	4	1	9	14	6	2.333	472	435	1.085
3	Germany	5	2	3	7	9	11	0.818	430	430	1.000
4	Netherlands	5	2	3	7	7	13	0.538	421	457	0.921
5	China	5	1	4	6	7	12	0.583	414	448	0.924
6	Japan	5	1	4	6	6	12	0.500	389	430	0.905

== Overall ranking ==
Place	Team
1st place, gold medalist(s)	Brazil
2nd place, silver medalist(s)	Russia
3rd place, bronze medalist(s)	Germany
4	Netherlands
5	China
6	Japan
7	Poland
8	Thailand
9	United States
10	Puerto Rico
11	Dominican Republic
12	South Korea

2009 FIVB Women's World Grand Prix winners

Brazil
Eighth title

Team Roster:
Natalia Pereira, Danielle Lins, Sheilla Castro, Adenisia Silva, Marianne Steinbrecher, Thaisa Menezes, Ana Tiemi Takagui, Fabiana de Oliveira, Regiane Bidias, Welissa Gonzaga, Fabiana Claudino, Camila Brait, Caroline Gattaz, Joyce Silva.
Head coach: José Roberto Guimarães

== Individual awards ==
- Most valuable player:
  - Sheilla Castro (BRA)
- Best spiker:
  - Tatiana Kosheleva (RUS)
- Best blocker:
  - Fabiana Claudino (BRA)
- Best server:
  - Manon Flier (NED)
- Best libero:
  - Kerstin Tzscherlich (GER)
- Best setter:
  - Yoshie Takeshita (JPN)
- Best scorer:
  - Manon Flier (NED)
