= Regina Moroz =

Russian volleyball player (born 1987)

Personal information
- Nationality: Russia
- Born: 14 January 1987 (age 39)
- Height: 1.88 m (6 ft 2 in)
- Weight: 70 kg (150 lb)
- Spike: 310 cm (120 in)
- Block: 303 cm (119 in)

Volleyball information
- Position: Middle Blocker
- Number: 22

Career
Years	Teams
2014	(Russia) Dinamo Kazan

Regina Moroz (born 14 January 1987) is a Russian female volleyball player. She is a member of the Russia women's national volleyball team and played for Dinamo Kazan in 2014.

She was part of the Russian national team at the 2014 FIVB Volleyball Women's World Championship in Italy.

== Clubs ==
- (Russia) Dinamo Kazan (2014)
