= 2014 FIVB Volleyball Women's Club World Championship =

2014 Women's Club World Championship
Tournament details
- Host country: Switzerland
- Dates: 7–11 May
- Teams: 6
- Venue: 1 (in 1 host city)

Final positions
- Champions: (Russia) Dinamo Kazan (1st title)

Tournament awards
- MVP: (Russia) Ekaterina Gamova (Dinamo Kazan)

The 2014 FIVB Women's Club World Championship was the 8th edition of the event. It was held in Zürich, Switzerland, from 7 to 11 May 2014. The Russian club Dinamo Kazan won the championship.

== Qualification ==
Team	Qualified as
(Switzerland) Voléro Zürich	Hosts
(Brazil) SESI-SP	2014 South American Champions
(Russia) Dinamo Kazan	2014 European Champions
(Japan) Hisamitsu Springs	2014 Asian Champions
(Brazil) Molico Osasco	Wildcard (2014 South American Runners-up)
(Algeria) GS Pétroliers	Wildcard (2014 African Champions)

== Pools composition ==
Pool A	Pool B
(Switzerland) Voléro Zürich (Brazil) SESI-SP (Algeria) GS Petroliers	(Russia) Dinamo Kazan (Japan) Hisamitsu Springs (Brazil) Molico Osasco

== Venue ==
All rounds
(Switzerland) Zürich
Saalsporthalle
Capacity: 2,300
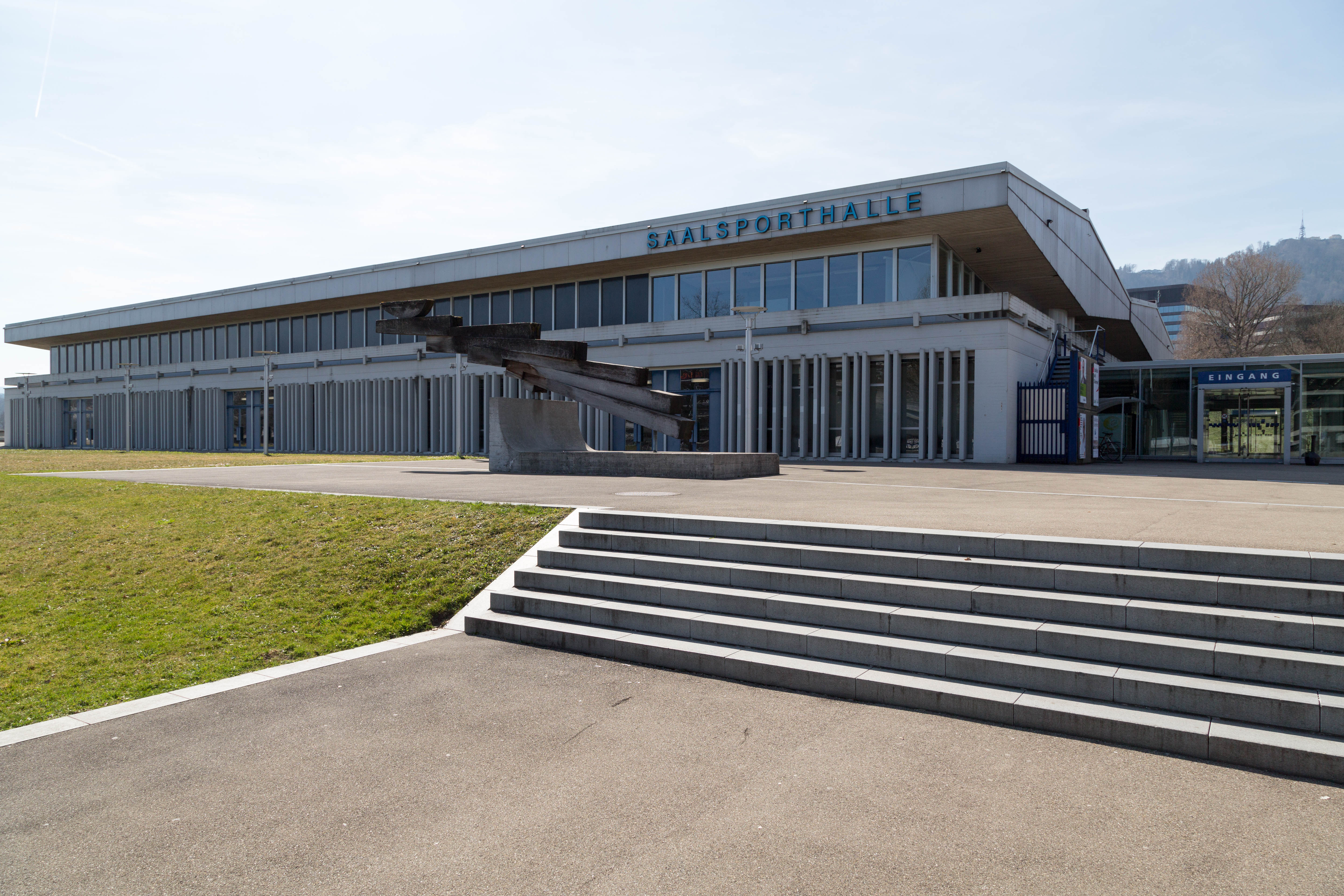

== Pool standing procedure ==
Match won 3–0 or 3–1: 3 points for the winner, 0 points for the loser
Match won 3–2: 2 points for the winner, 1 point for the loser
In case of tie, the teams will be classified according to the following criteria:
number of matches won, sets ratio and points ratio

== Preliminary round ==
- All times are Central European Summer Time (UTC+2).

=== Pool A ===
Pos	Team	Pld	W	L	Pts	SW	SL	SR	SPW	SPL	SPR	Qualification
1	(Switzerland) Voléro Zürich	2	2	0	5	6	2	3.000	172	142	1.211	Semifinals
2	(Brazil) SESI-SP	2	1	1	4	5	3	1.667	165	142	1.162	Semifinals
3	(Algeria) GS Petroliers	2	0	2	0	0	6	0.000	98	151	0.649	

Date	Time		Score		Set 1	Set 2	Set 3	Set 4	Set 5	Total	Report
7 May	20:00	Voléro Zürich (Switzerland)	3–2	(Brazil) SESI-SP	25–12	25–18	16–25	15–25	15–10	96–90	P2 P3
8 May	20:00	Voléro Zürich (Switzerland)	3–0	(Algeria) GS Petroliers	25–15	26–24	25–13			76–52	P2 P3
9 May	17:30	SESI-SP (Brazil)	3–0	(Algeria) GS Petroliers	25–18	25–12	25–16			75–46	P2 P3

=== Pool B ===
Pos	Team	Pld	W	L	Pts	SW	SL	SR	SPW	SPL	SPR	Qualification
1	(Russia) Dinamo Kazan	2	2	0	5	6	3	2.000	206	181	1.138	Semifinals
2	(Brazil) Molico Osasco	2	1	1	4	5	4	1.250	189	186	1.016	Semifinals
3	(Japan) Hisamitsu Springs	2	0	2	0	2	6	0.333	164	192	0.854	

Date	Time		Score		Set 1	Set 2	Set 3	Set 4	Set 5	Total	Report
7 May	17:30	Molico Osasco (Brazil)	3–1	(Japan) Hisamitsu Springs	25–12	20–25	25–18	25–22		95–77	P2 P3
8 May	17:30	Dinamo Kazan (Russia)	3–1	(Japan) Hisamitsu Springs	22–25	25–22	25–22	25–18		97–87	P2 P3
9 May	20:00	Molico Osasco (Brazil)	2–3	(Russia) Dinamo Kazan	11–25	19–25	25–20	25–23	14–16	94–109	P2 P3

== Final round ==
- All times are Central European Summer Time (UTC+2).

Semifinals
10 May
(Switzerland) Voléro Zürich	1
(Brazil) Molico Osasco	3
10 May
(Russia) Dinamo Kazan	3
(Brazil) SESI-SP	1

Final
11 May
(Brazil) Molico Osasco	0
(Russia) Dinamo Kazan	3
3rd place match
11 May
(Switzerland) Voléro Zürich	2
(Brazil) SESI-SP	3

=== Semifinals ===
Date	Time		Score		Set 1	Set 2	Set 3	Set 4	Set 5	Total	Report
10 May	15:30	Voléro Zürich (Switzerland)	1–3	(Brazil) Molico Osasco	21–25	25–18	16–25	20–25		82–93	P2 P3
10 May	18:00	Dinamo Kazan (Russia)	3–1	(Brazil) SESI-SP	25–23	27–29	25–21	25–14		102–87	P2 P3

=== 3rd place match ===
Date	Time		Score		Set 1	Set 2	Set 3	Set 4	Set 5	Total	Report
11 May	14:00	Voléro Zürich (Switzerland)	2–3	(Brazil) SESI-SP	18–25	25–20	21–25	25–23	13–15	102–108	P2 P3

=== Final ===
Date	Time		Score		Set 1	Set 2	Set 3	Set 4	Set 5	Total	Report
11 May	17:00	Molico Osasco (Brazil)	0–3	(Russia) Dinamo Kazan	11–25	16–25	25–27			52–77	P2 P3

== Final standing ==
Rank	Team
1st place, gold medalist(s)	(Russia) Dinamo Kazan
2nd place, silver medalist(s)	(Brazil) Molico Osasco
3rd place, bronze medalist(s)	(Brazil) SESI-SP
4	(Switzerland) Voléro Zürich
5	(Japan) Hisamitsu Springs
5	(Algeria) GS Petroliers

2014 Women's Club World Champions

1st title

Team roster
Borodakova (c), Malkova, Rossamakhina, Popova, Larson-Burbach, Gamova-Mukasey, Startseva, Ulanova, Del Core, Melnikova, Moroz, Voronkova
Head coach
Rishat Gilyazutdinov

== Awards ==
- Most valuable player
  (Russia) Ekaterina Gamova ( (Russia) Dinamo Kazan)
- Best opposite spiker
  (Russia) Ekaterina Gamova ( (Russia) Dinamo Kazan)
- Best outside hitters
  (Cuba) Kenia Carcaces ( (Switzerland) Voléro Zürich)
  (Brazil) Suelle Oliveira ( (Brazil) SESI-SP)
- Best middle blockers
  (Brazil) Thaísa Menezes ( (Brazil) Molico Osasco)
  (Russia) Regina Moroz ( (Russia) Dinamo Kazan)
- Best setter
  (Brazil) Fabiola de Souza ( (Brazil) Molico Osasco)
- Best libero
  (Russia) Ekaterina Ulanova ( (Russia) Dinamo Kazan)
