= List of flag bearers for Peru at the Olympics =

Peru at the Olympics
- IOC code: PER
- NOC: Peruvian Olympic Committee
- Website: www.coperu.org (in Spanish)
- Medals: Gold 1 Silver 3 Bronze 1 Total 5

Summer appearances
- 1900; 1904–1932; 1936; 1948; 1952; 1956; 1960; 1964; 1968; 1972; 1976; 1980; 1984; 1988; 1992; 1996; 2000; 2004; 2008; 2012; 2016; 2020; 2024

Winter appearances
- 2010; 2014; 2018; 2022; 2026

This is a list of flag bearers who have represented Peru at the Olympics.

Flag bearers carry the national flag of their country at the opening ceremony of the Olympic Games.

#	Event year	Season	Flag bearer	Sport
1	1936	Summer	Victor Flores	Manager
2	1948	Summer	Carlos Dominguez Mavila	Weightlifting
3	1972	Summer	Enrique Barúa	Fencing
4	1984	Summer	Edwin Vásquez	Shooting
5	1988	Summer	Rodrigo Ranguna	Manager
6	1992	Summer	Francisco Boza	Shooting
7	1996	Summer	Juan Giha	Shooting
8	2000	Summer	Rosa García	Volleyball
9	2004	Summer	Francisco Boza	Shooting
10	2008	Summer	Sixto Barrera	Wrestling
11	2010	Winter	Roberto Carcelen	Cross-country skiing
12	2012	Summer	Gladys Tejeda	Athletics
13	2014	Winter	Roberto Carcelen	Cross-country skiing
14	2016	Summer	Francisco Boza	Shooting
15	2020	Summer	Lucca Mesinas	Surfing
15	2020	Summer	Daniella Rosas	Surfing
16	2022	Winter	Ornella Oettl Reyes	Alpine skiing
17	2024	Summer	María Luisa Doig	Fencing
17	2024	Summer	Juan Postigos	Judo

== See also ==
- Peru at the Olympics
