= Oettl =

Oettl is a surname. Notable people with the surname include:

- Manfred Oettl Reyes (born 1993), Peruvian alpine skier
- Ornella Oettl Reyes (born 1991), Peruvian alpine skier
- Yannik Oettl (born 1996), German footballer

== See also ==
- Öttl
