= Peru at the 2010 Winter Olympics =

- IOC code: PER
- NOC: Peruvian Olympic Committee
- Website: www.coperu.org (in Spanish)

in Vancouver
- Competitors: 3 in 2 sports
- Flag bearer: Roberto Carcelen
- Medals: Gold 0 Silver 0 Bronze 0 Total 0

Winter Olympics appearances (overview)
- 2010; 2014; 2018; 2022; 2026

Peru sent a delegation to compete in the 2010 Winter Olympics in Vancouver, British Columbia, Canada from 12 to 28 February 2010. This marked Peru's debut at the Winter Olympics. The Peruvian delegation consisted of three athletes: two alpine skiers—Manfred Oettl Reyes and Ornella Oettl Reyes—and the cross-country skier Roberto Carcelen. The nation's best performance in any event was 67th place in the men's giant slalom alpine skiing event by Manfred Oettl Reyes.

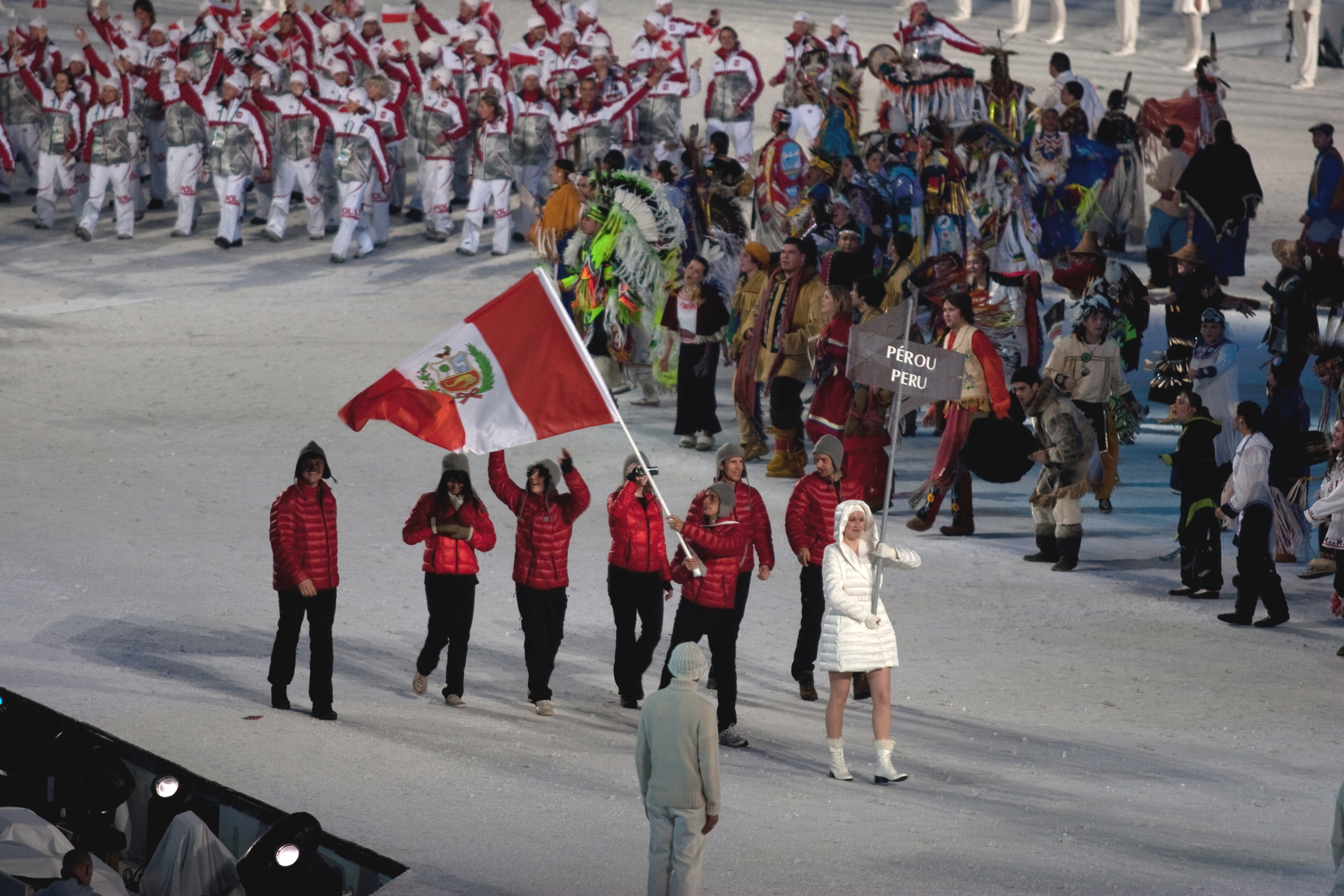
The athletes entering the stadium during the opening ceremonies.

== Background ==
Peru first competed at the Summer Olympics at the 1936 Berlin Games, and with the exception of the 1952 Helsinki Games, has participated in every Summer Games since. These Vancouver Olympics, however, would mark the nation's first participation in a Winter Olympic Games. The Peruvian delegation consisted of three athletes, the alpine skiers and siblings Manfred Oettl Reyes and Ornella Oettl Reyes, and cross-country skier Roberto Carcelen. Carcelen was chosen as the flag bearer for both the opening ceremony and the closing ceremony.

== Alpine skiing ==
Manfred Oettl Reyes was 16 years old at the time of the Games. He was born to a German father, and a Peruvian mother, and at the time, said he had only been to Peru twice in his life. His first event, the giant slalom, was held on 23 February. He posted run times of 1 minute and 29 seconds and 1 minute and 32 seconds. This saw him in 67th place out of 81 competitors who finished the race. On 27 February, he was disqualified during the first run of the slalom.

Ornella Oettl Reyes was 18 years old at the time of the Vancouver Olympics. During 24–25 February, she took part in the weather-impacted giant slalom, finishing the first run in a time of 1 minute and 27 seconds, but she failed to finish the second run and went unplaced in the final standings. The next day, she had a similar experience in the giant slalom, finishing the first run in a time of 59 seconds, but failing to complete the second run.

Athlete	Event	Run 1	Run 2	Total	Rank
Manfred Oettl Reyes	Men's slalom	DSQ	N/A	N/A	N/A
Manfred Oettl Reyes	Men's giant slalom	1:29.56	1:32.49	3:02.05	67
Ornella Oettl Reyes	Women's slalom	59.61	DNF	N/A	DNF
Ornella Oettl Reyes	Women's giant slalom	1:27.25	DNF	N/A	DNF

== Cross-country skiing ==
Roberto Carcelen was 39 years old at the time of the Vancouver Olympics. He took up skiing at the age of 34, after meeting his wife on an online dating site and moving from Peru to Seattle, Washington. He secured qualification at an event held at the Silver Star Mountain Resort in British Columbia. In his race, the 15 kilometre freestyle, he finished with a time of 45 minutes and 53 seconds, placing 94th out of 95 competitors.

Athlete	Event	Final		
Athlete	Event	Time	Deficit	Rank
Roberto Carcelen	15 kilometre freestyle	45:53.6	12:17.3	94
