= Peru at the 2014 Winter Olympics =

- IOC code: PER
- NOC: Peruvian Olympic Committee
- Website: www.coperu.org (in Spanish)

in Sochi
- Competitors: 3 in 2 sports
- Flag bearers: Roberto Carcelen (opening and closing)
- Medals: Gold 0 Silver 0 Bronze 0 Total 0

Winter Olympics appearances (overview)
- 2010; 2014; 2018; 2022; 2026; 2030

Peru competed at the 2014 Winter Olympics in Sochi, Russia from 7 to 23 February 2014. Peru's team consisted of three athletes in two sports. The same three athletes represented the country at the 2010 Winter Olympics in Vancouver.

== Competitors ==
| Sport | Men | Women | Total |
|---|---|---|---|
| Alpine skiing | 1 | 1 | 2 |
| Cross-country skiing | 1 | 0 | 1 |
| Total | 2 | 1 | 3 |

== Alpine skiing ==
According to the quota allocation released on January 20, 2014, Peru had two athletes in qualification position.

| Athlete | Event | Run 1 | | Run 2 | | Total | |
| Athlete | Event | Time | Rank | Time | Rank | Time | Rank |
|---|---|---|---|---|---|---|---|
| Manfred Oettl Reyes | Men's giant slalom | 1:47.05 | 78 | 1:33.91 | 58 | 3:20.96 | 70 |
| Manfred Oettl Reyes | Men's slalom | 58.36 | 65 | DNF | | | |
| Ornella Oettl Reyes | Women's giant slalom | 1:32.87 | 64 | 1:33.45 | 58 | 3:06.32 | 57 |
| Ornella Oettl Reyes | Women's slalom | DNF | | | | | |

== Cross-country skiing ==
According to the final quota allocation released on January 20, 2014, Peru had one athlete in qualification position. Carcelen broke his ribs and suffered contusions and was told by doctors he would miss the games. However he has decided to compete regardless. Carcelen finished in last place in the race, nearly 30 minutes behind the winner Dario Cologna of Switzerland.

Distance

| Athlete | Event | Final | | |
| Athlete | Event | Time | Deficit | Rank |
|---|---|---|---|---|
| Roberto Carcelen | Men's 15 km classical | 1:06:28.9 | +27:59.2 | 87 |

== See also ==
- Peru at the 2014 Summer Youth Olympics
