= Peru at the 2022 Winter Olympics =

- Flag of Peru
- IOC code: PER
- NOC: Peruvian Olympic Committee
- Website: www.coperu.org (in Spanish)

in Beijing, China 4–20 February 2022
- Competitors: 1 (0 men and 1 woman) in 1 sport
- Flag bearer (opening): Ornella Oettl Reyes
- Flag bearer (closing): Volunteer
- Medals: Gold 0 Silver 0 Bronze 0 Total 0

Winter Olympics appearances (overview)
- 2010; 2014; 2018; 2022; 2026

Peru competed at the 2022 Winter Olympics in Beijing, China, from 4 to 20 February 2022. It was the territory's third appearance at the Winter Olympics, since its debut at the 2010 Winter Olympics in Vancouver. The Peruvian delegation consisted of a single athlete competing in one sport. Peru did not win any medals at the Games.

== Background ==
The Peruvian Olympic Committee was formed on 9 October 1924. It was recognized by the International Olympic Committee (IOC) in 1936. Though Peru competed in the first Summer Olympics in 1900, and every Summer Olympics since the 1936 Summer Olympics except the 1952 Games, it made its Winter Olympics debut only in the 2010 Winter Olympics in Vancouver. The 2022 Winter Olympics was the nation's third appearance at the Winter Olympics.

The 2022 Winter Olympics was held in Beijing, China, between 4 and 22 February 2022. Alpine skier Ornella Oettl Reyes was the flag bearer for Peru in the opening ceremony. Meanwhile, a volunteer served as the flagbearer during the closing ceremony. Peru did not win a medal at the Games.

== Competitors ==
The Pueruvian team consists of two athletes (one male and one female) competing in two sports.

Sport	Men	Women	Total
Alpine skiing	0	1	1
Total	0	1	1

== Alpine skiing ==
The basic qualification mark for the slalom and giant slalom events stipulated an average of less than 160 points in the list published by the International Ski Federation (FIS) as on 17 January 2022. The quotas were allocated further based on athletes satisfying other criteria with a maximum of 22 athletes (11 male and 11 female athletes) from a single participating NOC. Peruvian alpine skier Ornella Oettl Reyes met the basic qualification standard and qualified to participate in both the events at the games.

Reyes was born in Germany, to a Peruvian mother. She was brought up in Germany, but chose to represent Peru in international competitions since 2010. She and her brother Manfred Oettl Reyes, were the first Winter Olympians from Peru, making their debut at the 2010 Winter Olympics. They again represented the country in the 2014 Winter Olympics, and this edition marked Reyes' third appearance at the Winter Olympics.

In the giant slalom event held at the Yanqing National Alpine Skiing Centre, Reyes completed her first run in 1:12.52 to rank 57th amongst the 80 competitors. She completed the course during her second run at 1:11.53, and ranked 46th in the classification. With a combined time of 2:24.05, she finished 46th in the overall classification. In the slalom event held on 16 February 2022, she completed her first run in 1:03.25 and was ranked 53rd. Though she improved to 1:01.34 in the second run to be ranked 44th, she eventually finished 44th amongst the 80 competitors.

Athlete	Event	Run 1		Run 2		Total	
Athlete	Event	Time	Rank	Time	Rank	Time	Rank
Ornella Oettl Reyes	Women's giant slalom	1:12.52	57	1:11.53	46	2:24.05	46
Ornella Oettl Reyes	Women's slalom	1:03.25	53	1:01.34	44	2:04.59	44

== See also ==
- Tropical nations at the Winter Olympics
