= Peru at the Olympics =

- IOC code: PER
- NOC: Peruvian Olympic Committee
- Website: www.coperu.org (in Spanish)
- Medals Ranked 98th: Gold 1 Silver 3 Bronze 1 Total 5

Summer appearances
- 1900; 1904–1932; 1936; 1948; 1952; 1956; 1960; 1964; 1968; 1972; 1976; 1980; 1984; 1988; 1992; 1996; 2000; 2004; 2008; 2012; 2016; 2020; 2024

Winter appearances
- 2010; 2014; 2018; 2022; 2026

Peru has officially participated in 20 Summer Olympic Games and 3 Winter Olympic Games. They did not send any athletes to the 1952 Summer Olympics. The Peruvian Olympic Committee is the National Olympic Committee for Peru which was founded in 1924 and recognized by the International Olympic Committee in 1936.

Peru's first official appearance at the Olympic Games was at the 1936 Summer Olympics in Berlin. However, prior to the creation of the Peruvian Olympic Committee in 1924, the Peruvian Carlos de Candamo competed in the 1900 Summer Olympics in two fencing events of foil and épée. Peru's first participation in the Winter Olympic Games occurred during the 2010 Winter Olympics.

Peru has won a total of five medals, three in shooting, one in volleyball and one in sailing. Their only gold medal was won by Edwin Vásquez in the 1948 Summer Olympics in the Men's 50 metre pistol. The first silver medal was won by Francisco Boza in Trap at the 1984 Summer Olympics. The Peru women's national volleyball team won Peru's second silver medal in the 1988 Summer Olympics, and Juan Giha won their third silver and latest medal in skeet at the 1992 Summer Olympics. The first bronze medal was won by Stefano Peschiera at the 2024 Summer Olympics in sailing.

== Medal tables ==
=== Medals by Summer Games ===
Games	Athletes	Gold	Silver	Bronze	Total	Rank
(Nazi Germany) 1936 Berlin	40	0	0	0	0	–
(United Kingdom) 1948 London	42	1	0	0	1	22
(Finland) 1952 Helsinki	did not participate					
(Australia) 1956 Melbourne	8	0	0	0	0	–
(Italy) 1960 Rome	31	0	0	0	0	–
(Japan) 1964 Tokyo	31	0	0	0	0	–
1968 Mexico City	28	0	0	0	0	–
(West Germany) 1972 Munich	20	0	0	0	0	–
(Canada) 1976 Montreal	13	0	0	0	0	–
(Soviet Union) 1980 Moscow	30	0	0	0	0	–
(United States) 1984 Los Angeles	35	0	1	0	1	33
(South Korea) 1988 Seoul	21	0	1	0	1	36
(Spain) 1992 Barcelona	16	0	1	0	1	49
(United States) 1996 Atlanta	29	0	0	0	0	–
(Australia) 2000 Sydney	22	0	0	0	0	–
(Greece) 2004 Athens	12	0	0	0	0	–
(China) 2008 Beijing	13	0	0	0	0	–
(United Kingdom) 2012 London	16	0	0	0	0	–
(Brazil) 2016 Rio de Janeiro	29	0	0	0	0	–
(Japan) 2020 Tokyo	35	0	0	0	0	–
(France) 2024 Paris	26	0	0	1	1	84
(United States) 2028 Los Angeles	future event					
(Australia) 2032 Brisbane	future event					
Total		1	3	1	5	98

=== Medals by Winter Games ===
Games	Athletes	Gold	Silver	Bronze	Total	Rank
(Canada) 2010 Vancouver	3	0	0	0	0	–
(Russia) 2014 Sochi	3	0	0	0	0	–
(South Korea) 2018 Pyeongchang	did not participate					
(China) 2022 Beijing	1	0	0	0	0	–
(Italy) 2026 Milano Cortina	did not participate					
(France) 2030 French Alps	future event					
(United States) 2034 Utah	future event					
Total		0	0	0	0	–

=== Medals by summer sport ===
Sports	Gold	Silver	Bronze	Total	Rank
Shooting	1	2	0	3	41
Volleyball	0	1	0	1	17
Sailing	0	0	1	1	46
Total	1	3	1	5	98

=== Medals by gender ===
Gender	Gold	Silver	Bronze	Total
Men	1	2	1	4
Women	0	1	0	1
Mixed	0	0	0	0
Total	1	3	1	5

== List of medalists ==
Medal	Name	Games	Sport	Event
Gold	Edwin Vásquez	(United Kingdom) 1948 London	Shooting	Men's 50 meter pistol
Silver	Francisco Boza	(United States) 1984 Los Angeles	Shooting	Trap
Silver	National volleyball team: Luisa Cervera Denisse Fajardo Miriam Gallardo Rosa García Alejandra de la Guerra Sonia Heredia Katherine Horny Natalia Málaga Gabriela Pérez del Solar Cecilia Tait Gina Torrealva Cenaida Uribe	(South Korea) 1988 Seoul	Volleyball	Women's tournament
Silver	Juan Giha	(Spain) 1992 Barcelona	Shooting	Skeet
Bronze	Stefano Peschiera	(France) 2024 Paris	Sailing	Laser

== Summary by sport ==
=== Fencing ===
Peru's 1900 Olympic debut included 1 fencer, Carlos de Candamo, who competed in each of the foil and épée individual amateur events and reached the repechage (18th to 24th place) in the foil. As of the 2016 Games, the nation has yet to win a medal in the sport.

Games	Fencers	Events	Gold	Silver	Bronze	Total
1900 Paris	1	2/7	0	0	0	0
Total			0	0	0	0

=== Football (association) ===
Olympic Games Record
Year	Round	Position	GP	W	D*	L	GS	GA
1900–1928	Did not qualify	-	-	-	-	-	-	-
(Germany) 1936	Quarter-finals	5/16	2	2	0	0	11	5
1948–1956	Did not qualify	-	-	-	-	-	-	-
(Italy) 1960	Round 1	11/16	3	1	0	2	6	9
1964–2012	Did not qualify	-	-	-	-	-	-	-
Total	2/24		5	3	0	2	17	14

Olympic Games History
Year	Round	Score	Result
1936	Round of 16	Peru 7 – 3 Finland	Win
1936	Quarter-finals	Peru 4 – 2 Austria	Win(*)
1960	Round 1	Peru 1 – 2 France	Loss
1960	Round 1	Peru 2 – 6 Hungary	Loss
1960	Round 1	Peru 3 – 1 India	Win

==== 1936 Summer Olympics ====
Peru was invited to join the Olympics for its first time in 1936, when they were to be held at Berlin. Among the line of players featured in this first participation of the Blanquirroja were Alejandro Villanueva, Teodoro Fernández, Juan Valdivieso, and Adelfo Magallanes. The Peruvian players, after arriving to Germany by transport of an Italian ship, were awestruck by the modern stadiums and the German idolatry of Adolf Hitler. The first match against Finland was played on August 6, 1936, and was won with great ease by the Peruvians with a 7–3 result. Peru's next match was against Austria in the quarterfinals. The match was highly contested, and the game went into overtime when the Peruvians tied the Austrians after being two goals behind. Peru scored 5 goals during overtime, of which 3 were nulled by the referee, and won by the final score of 4–2.

The Austrians demanded a rematch on the grounds that Peruvian fans had stormed the field, and because the field did not meet the requirements for a football game. Austria further claimed that the Peruvian players had manhandled the Austrian players and that spectators, one holding a revolver, had "swarmed down on the field." Peru was notified of this situation, and they attempted to go to the assigned meeting but were delayed by a German parade. At the end, the Peruvian defense was never heard, and the Olympic Committee and FIFA sided with the Austrians. The rematch was scheduled to be taken under close grounds on August 10, and later rescheduled to be taken on August 11.

As a sign of protest against these actions, which the Peruvians deemed as insulting and discriminatory, the complete Olympic delegations of Peru and Colombia left Germany. Argentina, Chile, Uruguay, and Mexico expressed their solidarity with Peru. Michael Dasso, a member of the Peruvian Olympic Committee, stated: "We've no faith in European athletics. We have come here and found a bunch of merchants." The game was awarded to Austria by default. In Peru, angry crowds protested against the decisions of the Olympic Committee by tearing down an Olympic flag, throwing stones at the German consulate, refusing to load German vessels in the docks of Callao, and listening to inflammatory speeches which included President Oscar Benavides Larrea's mention of "the crafty Berlin decision." To this day, it is not known with certainty what exactly happened at Germany, but it is popularly believed that Adolf Hitler and the Nazi authorities might have had some involvement in this situation.

==== 1960 Summer Olympics ====
After 24 years, Peru once again qualified for the football tournament at the 1960 Summer Olympics held in Rome with their U-23 football team. The team started out with a surprise 1st-minute goal against France, scored by Ángel Uribe. Peru would go on to lose 2–1 against the French, and were later beaten by Hungary 6–2, with Alberto Ramírez earning a brace. The last match was played against India, and Peru would win 3–1 with goals by Nicolas Nieri and Tomás Iwasaki.

Peru has not qualified again to the tournament since 1960, but were close to qualifying again in the 1964, 1972 and 1980 CONMEBOL Men Pre-Olympic Tournament.

== See also ==
- List of flag bearers for Peru at the Olympics
- Category:Olympic competitors for Peru
- Tropical nations at the Winter Olympics
- Peru at the Paralympics
