= Beach volleyball at the 2024 Bolivarian Youth Games =

Beach volleyball competitions at the 2024 Bolivarian Youth Games

- Beach volleyball pictogram
- Venue: Complejo Deportivo Garcilazo
- Dates: 4–7 April 2024
- Competitors: 22 from 6 nations
- Teams: 11 (6 boys and 5 girls)

Medalists
gold medal	Jorge Brain–Vicente Belmar	Chile
gold medal	Ilanna Dvorquez–Stephany Cherrez	Ecuador
silver medal	Rafael Daza–Pablo Choque	Bolivia
silver medal	Maria Belen Peredo–Avril Vásquez	Bolivia
bronze medal	Javier Ávalos–Josmany Bermúdez	Ecuador
bronze medal	Mishelle Gómez–Estephanie Castillo	Peru

Beach volleyball competitions at the 2024 Bolivarian Youth Games in Sucre, Bolivia were held from 4 to 7 April 2024 at Complejo Deportivo Garcilazo.

Two medal events were scheduled to be contested: a boys' tournament and a girls' tournament. A total of 22 athletes (6 pairs of boys and 5 pairs of girls) competed in the events. Athletes had to be born between 1 January 2005 and 31 December 2008 to be eligible (ages 16 to 19).

The pairs from Chile and Ecuador won the boys and girls tournaments, respectively.

== Participating nations ==
A total of 6 National Olympic Committees (NOCs) registered athletes for the beach volleyball competitions. Each NOC was able to enter a maximum of 4 beach volleyball players (one team of two players per gender).

Numbers in parentheses indicate the number of players entered the competition by each NOC.

- Bolivia (4)
- Chile (4)
- Ecuador (4)
- Panama (4)
- Peru (4)
- Venezuela (2)

=== Teams ===
NOC	Boys' pairs	Girls' pairs
Bolivia	Rafael Daza – Pablo Choque	Maria Belen Peredo – Avril Vásquez
Chile	Jorge Brain – Vicente Belmar	Martina Salvatierra – Luna Álvarez
Ecuador	Javier Ávalos – Josmany Bermúdez	Ilanna Dvorquez – Valeska Chérrez
Panama	Bernardo Madrid – Yostin Gantes	Aylin Nájera – Elleny De León
Peru	Renato Parreño – Diego Sarmiento	Mishelle Gómez – Estephanie Castillo
Venezuela	Sebastián Pereira – Eduardo Rodríguez	—

== Medal summary ==
=== Medal table ===
* Host nation (Bolivia)

Rank	NOC	Gold	Silver	Bronze	Total
1	Ecuador (ECU)	1	0	1	2
2	Chile (CHI)	1	0	0	1
3	Bolivia (BOL)*	0	2	0	2
4	Peru (PER)	0	0	1	1
Totals (4 entries)		2	2	2	6

Source: I Bolivarian Youth Games Sucre 2024 – Beach volleyball medals

=== Medalists ===
Event	Gold	Silver	Bronze
Boys' tournament	Chile; Jorge Brain; Vicente Belmar	Bolivia; Rafael Daza; Pablo Choque	Ecuador; Javier Ávalos; Josmany Bermúdez
Girls' tournament	Ecuador; Ilanna Dvorquez; Valeska Chérrez	Bolivia; Maria Belen Peredo; Avril Vásquez	Peru; Mishelle Gómez; Estephanie Castillo

== Boys' tournament ==
2024 Bolivarian Youth Games Boys' Beach volleyball tournament
Tournament details
- Host country: Bolivia
- City: Sucre
- Dates: 4–7 April 2024
- Teams: 6 (from 2 confederations)
- Venue: 1 (in 1 host city)

Final positions
- Champions: Chile; Jorge Brain; Vicente Belmar (1st title)
- Runners-up: Bolivia; Rafael Daza; Pablo Choque
- Third place: Ecuador; Javier Ávalos; Josmany Bermúdez

The boy's tournament was held from 4 to 7 April 2024 and consisted of a preliminary round, semi-finals and placement and medals matches.

All match times are local times, BOT (UTC−4).

=== Preliminary round ===
The preliminary round consisted of a single group of six teams in which each team played once against the other 5 teams in the group on a single round-robin basis. The top four teams advanced to the semi-finals, while the fifth and sixth placed teams played the classification match for the fifth place.

Pos	Team	Pld	W	L	Pts	SW	SL	SR	SPW	SPL	SPR	Qualification
1	Brain–Belmar (CHI)	5	5	0	10	10	1	10.000	221	154	1.435	Semi-finals
2	Pereira–Rodríguez (VEN)	5	4	1	9	9	2	4.500	217	155	1.400	Semi-finals
3	Daza–Choque (BOL) (H)	5	3	2	8	6	5	1.200	208	165	1.261	Semi-finals
4	Ávalos–Bermúdez (ECU)	5	2	3	7	5	6	0.833	183	182	1.005	Semi-finals
5	Madrid–Gantes (PAN)	5	1	4	6	2	8	0.250	134	211	0.635	5th place match
6	Parreño–Sarmiento (PER)	5	0	5	5	0	10	0.000	119	215	0.553	5th place match

(H) Host

4 April 2024; 11:00	Parreño–Sarmiento (Peru)	0–2	(Ecuador) Ávalos–Bermúdez	Complejo Deportivo Garcilazo; Referees: R. Paiva (BRA), E. López (BOL)
4 April 2024; 11:00	(5–21, 12–21); Report			Complejo Deportivo Garcilazo; Referees: R. Paiva (BRA), E. López (BOL)

4 April 2024; 12:00	Brain–Belmar (Chile)	2–1	(Venezuela) Pereira–Rodríguez	Complejo Deportivo Garcilazo; Referees: C. Vega (PER), A. Nina (BOL)
4 April 2024; 12:00	(17–21, 21–18, 15–10); Report			Complejo Deportivo Garcilazo; Referees: C. Vega (PER), A. Nina (BOL)

4 April 2024; 13:00	Daza–Choque (Bolivia)	2–0	(Panama) Madrid–Gantes	Complejo Deportivo Garcilazo; Referees: N. Ordoñez (ARG), O. Urquizu (BOL)
4 April 2024; 13:00	(21–12, 21–12); Report			Complejo Deportivo Garcilazo; Referees: N. Ordoñez (ARG), O. Urquizu (BOL)

4 April 2024; 16:00	Brain–Belmar (Chile)	2–0	(Peru) Parreño–Sarmiento	Complejo Deportivo Garcilazo; Referees: O. Urquizu (BOL), N. Ordoñez (ARG)
4 April 2024; 16:00	(21–13, 21–15); Report			Complejo Deportivo Garcilazo; Referees: O. Urquizu (BOL), N. Ordoñez (ARG)

4 April 2024; 17:00	Ávalos–Bermúdez (Ecuador)	2–0	(Panama) Madrid–Gantes	Complejo Deportivo Garcilazo; Referees: A. Nina (BOL), E. López (BOL)
4 April 2024; 17:00	(21–15, 21–15); Report			Complejo Deportivo Garcilazo; Referees: A. Nina (BOL), E. López (BOL)

4 April 2024; 18:00	Daza–Choque (Bolivia)	0–2	(Venezuela) Pereira–Rodríguez	Complejo Deportivo Garcilazo; Referees: R. Paiva (BRA), N. Ordoñez (ARG)
4 April 2024; 18:00	(19–21, 18–21); Report			Complejo Deportivo Garcilazo; Referees: R. Paiva (BRA), N. Ordoñez (ARG)

5 April 2024; 11:00	Parreño–Sarmiento (Peru)	0–2	(Venezuela) Pereira–Rodríguez	Complejo Deportivo Garcilazo; Referees: N. Ordoñez (ARG), E. López (BOL)
5 April 2024; 11:00	(7–21, 7–21); Report			Complejo Deportivo Garcilazo; Referees: N. Ordoñez (ARG), E. López (BOL)

5 April 2024; 12:00	Brain–Belmar (Chile)	2–0	(Panama) Madrid–Gantes	Complejo Deportivo Garcilazo; Referees: A. Nina (BOL), C. Vega (PER)
5 April 2024; 12:00	(21–5, 21–10); Report			Complejo Deportivo Garcilazo; Referees: A. Nina (BOL), C. Vega (PER)

5 April 2024; 13:00	Daza–Choque (Bolivia)	2–1	(Ecuador) Ávalos–Bermúdez	Complejo Deportivo Garcilazo; Referees: R. Paiva (BRA), N. Ordoñez (ARG)
5 April 2024; 13:00	(21–9, 15–21, 15–10); Report			Complejo Deportivo Garcilazo; Referees: R. Paiva (BRA), N. Ordoñez (ARG)

5 April 2024; 16:00	Pereira–Rodríguez (Venezuela)	2–0	(Panama) Madrid–Gantes	Complejo Deportivo Garcilazo; Referees: A. Nina (BOL), E. López (BOL)
5 April 2024; 16:00	(21–11, 21–7); Report			Complejo Deportivo Garcilazo; Referees: A. Nina (BOL), E. López (BOL)

5 April 2024; 17:00	Brain–Belmar (Chile)	2–0	(Ecuador) Ávalos–Bermúdez	Complejo Deportivo Garcilazo; Referees: R. Paiva (BRA), O. Urquizu (BOL)
5 April 2024; 17:00	(21–12, 21–14); Report			Complejo Deportivo Garcilazo; Referees: R. Paiva (BRA), O. Urquizu (BOL)

5 April 2024; 18:00	Daza–Choque (Bolivia)	2–0	(Peru) Parreño–Sarmiento	Complejo Deportivo Garcilazo; Referees: N. Ordoñez (ARG), C. Vega (PER)
5 April 2024; 18:00	(21–11, 21–6); Report			Complejo Deportivo Garcilazo; Referees: N. Ordoñez (ARG), C. Vega (PER)

6 April 2024; 11:00	Ávalos–Bermúdez (Ecuador)	0–2	(Venezuela) Pereira–Rodríguez	Complejo Deportivo Garcilazo; Referees: C. Vega (PER), E. López (BOL)
6 April 2024; 11:00	(14–21, 19–21); Report			Complejo Deportivo Garcilazo; Referees: C. Vega (PER), E. López (BOL)

6 April 2024; 12:00	Daza–Choque (Bolivia)	0–2	(Chile) Brain–Belmar	Complejo Deportivo Garcilazo; Referees: N. Ordoñez (ARG), C. Vega (PER)
6 April 2024; 12:00	(18–21, 18–21); Report			Complejo Deportivo Garcilazo; Referees: N. Ordoñez (ARG), C. Vega (PER)

6 April 2024; 13:00	Parreño–Sarmiento (Peru)	0–2	(Panama) Madrid–Gantes	Complejo Deportivo Garcilazo; Referees: O. Urquizu (BOL), R. Paiva (BRA)
6 April 2024; 13:00	(19–21, 24–26); Report			Complejo Deportivo Garcilazo; Referees: O. Urquizu (BOL), R. Paiva (BRA)

=== Bracket ===
The semi-finals match-ups were determined based on the teams' positions in the preliminary round as follows:

- Semifinal 1: First placed team vs Fourth placed team
- Semifinal 2: Third placed team vs Second placed team

Winners of semi-finals played the gold medal match, while losers played the bronze medal match.

Semi-finals
6 April
Brain–Belmar (CHI)	2
Ávalos–Bermúdez (ECU)	0
6 April
Daza–Choque (BOL)	2
Pereira–Rodríguez (VEN)	0

Gold medal match
7 April
Brain–Belmar (CHI)	2
Daza–Choque (BOL)	1

Fifth place match
7 April
Madrid–Gantes (PAN)	0
Parreño–Sarmiento (PER) (w/o)	2

Bronze medal match
7 April
Ávalos–Bermúdez (ECU)	2
Pereira–Rodríguez (VEN)	1

=== Semi-finals ===
6 April 2024; 16:00	Brain–Belmar (Chile)	2–0	(Ecuador) Ávalos–Bermúdez	Complejo Deportivo Garcilazo; Referees: R. Paiva (BRA), O. Urquizu (BOL)
6 April 2024; 16:00	(21–15, 21–17); Report			Complejo Deportivo Garcilazo; Referees: R. Paiva (BRA), O. Urquizu (BOL)

6 April 2024; 17:00	Daza–Choque (Bolivia)	2–0	(Venezuela) Pereira–Rodríguez	Complejo Deportivo Garcilazo; Referees: C. Vega (PER), N. Ordoñez (ARG)
6 April 2024; 17:00	(27–25, 24–22); Report			Complejo Deportivo Garcilazo; Referees: C. Vega (PER), N. Ordoñez (ARG)

=== Fifth place match ===
7 April 2024; 10:00	Madrid–Gantes (Panama)	0–2; Forfeited	(Peru) Parreño–Sarmiento	Complejo Deportivo Garcilazo; Referees: O. Urquizu (BOL), E. López (BOL)
7 April 2024; 10:00	(0–21, 0–21); Report			Complejo Deportivo Garcilazo; Referees: O. Urquizu (BOL), E. López (BOL)

Panama did not start and lost the match by forfeit.

=== Bronze medal match ===
7 April 2024; 11:00	Ávalos–Bermúdez (Ecuador)	2–1	(Venezuela) Pereira–Rodríguez	Complejo Deportivo Garcilazo; Referees: A. Nina (BOL), R. Paiva (BRA)
7 April 2024; 11:00	(12–21, 21–19, 15–13); Report			Complejo Deportivo Garcilazo; Referees: A. Nina (BOL), R. Paiva (BRA)

=== Gold medal match ===
7 April 2024; 14:00	Brain–Belmar (Chile)	2–1	(Bolivia) Daza–Choque	Complejo Deportivo Garcilazo; Referees: N. Ordoñez (ARG), R. Paiva (BRA)
7 April 2024; 14:00	(20–22, 21–16, 15–11); Report			Complejo Deportivo Garcilazo; Referees: N. Ordoñez (ARG), R. Paiva (BRA)

== Girls' tournament ==
Beach volleyball at the 2024 Bolivarian Youth Games
Tournament details
- Host country: Bolivia
- City: Sucre
- Dates: 4–7 April 2024
- Teams: 5 (from 2 confederations)
- Venue: 1 (in 1 host city)
- Runners-up: Bolivia; Maria Belen Peredo; Avril Vásquez
- Third place: Peru; Mishelle Gómez; Estephanie Castillo

The girls' tournament was aldo held from 4 to 7 April 2024 and also consisted of a preliminary round, semi-finals and medals matches.

All match times are local times, BOT (UTC−4).

=== Preliminary round ===
The preliminary round consisted of a single group of five teams in which each team played once against the other 4 teams in the group on a single round-robin basis. The top four teams advanced to the semi-finals.

Pos	Team	Pld	W	L	Pts	SW	SL	SR	SPW	SPL	SPR	Qualification
1	Dvorquez–Cherrez (ECU)	4	4	0	8	8	0	MAX	168	100	1.680	Semi-finals
2	Peredo–Vásquez (BOL) (H)	4	3	1	7	6	2	3.000	159	102	1.559	Semi-finals
3	Gómez–Castillo (PER)	3	2	1	5	4	2	2.000	148	125	1.184	Semi-finals
4	Salvatierra–Álvarez (CHI)	4	1	3	5	2	6	0.333	121	135	0.896	Semi-finals
5	Nájera–De León (PAN)	4	0	4	4	0	8	0.000	34	168	0.202	5th place

(H) Host

4 April 2024; 9:00	Dvorquez–Cherrez (Ecuador)	2–0	(Chile) Salvatierra–Álvarez	Complejo Deportivo Garcilazo; Referees: A. Nina (BOL), C. Vega (PER)
4 April 2024; 9:00	(21–12, 21–11); Report			Complejo Deportivo Garcilazo; Referees: A. Nina (BOL), C. Vega (PER)

4 April 2024; 10:00	Peredo–Vásquez (Bolivia)	2–1	(Panama) Nájera–De León	Complejo Deportivo Garcilazo; Referees: N. Ordoñez (ARG), O. Urquizu (BOL)
4 April 2024; 10:00	(21–4, 21–5); Report			Complejo Deportivo Garcilazo; Referees: N. Ordoñez (ARG), O. Urquizu (BOL)

4 April 2024; 14:00	Dvorquez–Cherrez (Ecuador)	2–0	(Peru) Gómez–Castillo	Complejo Deportivo Garcilazo; Referees: E. López (BOL), R. Paiva (BRA)
4 April 2024; 14:00	(21–18, 21–16); Report			Complejo Deportivo Garcilazo; Referees: E. López (BOL), R. Paiva (BRA)

4 April 2024; 15:00	Peredo–Vásquez (Bolivia)	2–0	(Chile) Salvatierra–Álvarez	Complejo Deportivo Garcilazo; Referees: C. Vega (PER), A. Nina (BOL)
4 April 2024; 15:00	(21–13, 21–8); Report			Complejo Deportivo Garcilazo; Referees: C. Vega (PER), A. Nina (BOL)

5 April 2024; 9:00	Dvorquez–Cherrez (Ecuador)	0–2	(Panama) Nájera–De León	Complejo Deportivo Garcilazo; Referees: O. Urquizu (BOL), C. Vega (PER)
5 April 2024; 9:00	(21–4, 21–6); Report			Complejo Deportivo Garcilazo; Referees: O. Urquizu (BOL), C. Vega (PER)

5 April 2024; 10:00	Gómez–Castillo (Peru)	2–0	(Chile) Salvatierra–Álvarez	Complejo Deportivo Garcilazo; Referees: E. López (BOL), R. Paiva (BRA)
5 April 2024; 10:00	(21–16, 21–19); Report			Complejo Deportivo Garcilazo; Referees: E. López (BOL), R. Paiva (BRA)

5 April 2024; 14:00	Peredo–Vásquez (Bolivia)	0–2	(Ecuador) Dvorquez–Cherrez	Complejo Deportivo Garcilazo; Referees: C. Vega (PER), O. Urquizu (BOL)
5 April 2024; 14:00	(19–21, 14–21); Report			Complejo Deportivo Garcilazo; Referees: C. Vega (PER), O. Urquizu (BOL)

5 April 2024; 15:00	Gómez–Castillo (Peru)	2–0	(Panama) Nájera–De León	Complejo Deportivo Garcilazo; Referees: E. López (BOL), A. Nina (BOL)
5 April 2024; 15:00	(21–1, 21–5); Report			Complejo Deportivo Garcilazo; Referees: E. López (BOL), A. Nina (BOL)

6 April 2024; 9:00	Salvatierra–Álvarez (Chile)	2–0	(Panama) Nájera–De León	Complejo Deportivo Garcilazo; Referees: E. López (BOL), A. Nina (BOL)
6 April 2024; 9:00	(21–4, 21–5); Report			Complejo Deportivo Garcilazo; Referees: E. López (BOL), A. Nina (BOL)

6 April 2024; 10:00	Peredo–Vásquez (Bolivia)	2–0	(Peru) Gómez–Castillo	Complejo Deportivo Garcilazo; Referees: R. Paiva (BRA), O. Urquizu (BOL)
6 April 2024; 10:00	(21–19, 21–11); Report			Complejo Deportivo Garcilazo; Referees: R. Paiva (BRA), O. Urquizu (BOL)

=== Bracket ===
The semi-finals match-ups were determined based on the teams' positions in the preliminary round as follows:

- Semifinal 1: First placed team vs Fourth placed team
- Semifinal 2: Third placed team vs Second placed team

Winners of semi-finals played the gold medal match, while losers played the bronze medal match.

Semi-finals
6 April
Dvorquez–Cherrez (ECU)	2
Salvatierra–Álvarez (CHI)	1
6 April
Peredo–Vásquez (BOL)	2
Gómez–Castillo (PER)	0

Gold medal match
7 April
Peredo–Vásquez (ECU)	2
Dvorquez–Cherrez (BOL)	0
Bronze medal match
7 April
Gómez–Castillo (CHI)	0
Salvatierra–Álvarez (PER)	2

=== Semi-finals ===
6 April 2024; 14:00	Peredo–Vásquez (Bolivia)	2–1	(Peru) Gómez–Castillo	Complejo Deportivo Garcilazo; Referees: N. Ordoñez (ARG), O. Urquizu (BOL)
6 April 2024; 14:00	(19–21, 21–18, 15–11); Report			Complejo Deportivo Garcilazo; Referees: N. Ordoñez (ARG), O. Urquizu (BOL)

6 April 2024; 15:00	Dvorquez–Cherrez (Ecuador)	2–0	(Chile) Salvatierra–Álvarez	Complejo Deportivo Garcilazo; Referees: A. Nina (BOL), E. López (BOL)
6 April 2024; 15:00	(21–19, 21–7); Report			Complejo Deportivo Garcilazo; Referees: A. Nina (BOL), E. López (BOL)

=== Bronze medal match ===
7 April 2024; 12:00	Salvatierra–Álvarez (Chile)	0–2	(Peru) Gómez–Castillo	Complejo Deportivo Garcilazo; Referees: E. López (BOL), O. Urquizu (BOL)
7 April 2024; 12:00	(8–21, 8–21); Report			Complejo Deportivo Garcilazo; Referees: E. López (BOL), O. Urquizu (BOL)

=== Gold medal match ===
7 April 2024; 13:00	Dvorquez–Cherrez (Ecuador)	2–0	(Bolivia) Peredo–Vásquez	Complejo Deportivo Garcilazo; Referees: C. Vega (PER), A. Nina (BOL)
7 April 2024; 13:00	(21–13, 21–14); Report			Complejo Deportivo Garcilazo; Referees: C. Vega (PER), A. Nina (BOL)
