= 2024 Bolivarian Youth Games =

Multi-sport event in Bolivia

I Bolivarian Youth Games
- Host city: Sucre
- Country: Bolivia
- Nations: 7
- Athletes: 1,137
- Events: 234 in 24 sports (27 disciplines)
- Opening: 4 April
- Closing: 14 April
- Dates: 4–14 April
- Opened by: President Luis Arce
- Torch lighter: Conrrado Moscoso
- Main venue: Estadio Olímpico Patria
- Website: www.sucre2024.org

The 2024 Bolivarian Youth Games (Spanish: Juegos Bolivarianos de la Juventud 2024), officially known as the I Bolivarian Youth Games "Sucre 2024" and simply known as Sucre 2024, is the first edition of the Bolivarian Youth Games, a regional multi-sport event for athletes of up to 19 years old, organized by the Organización Deportiva Bolivariana (ODEBO). Originally scheduled to be held in Sucre, Bolivia from 17 April to 1 May 2020, the inaugural edition of the Bolivarian Youth Games underwent several postponements until finally held from 4 to 14 April 2024.

== Host city and date changes ==
ODEBO launched the Bolivarian Youth Games for the first time in 2010 with Lima, Peru to be the host city of the first edition in 2015. In February 2015, the event was postponed in order to establish the age limit for athletes as well as the sports program and a new date for the Games. In July 2015, during its Extraordinary General Assembly, ODEBO moved the Games to 2016, keeping Lima as host city.

In January 2016, ODEBO approved the age range for athletes following the same criteria as the International Olympic Committee for the Youth Olympic Games, and the Games were moved to 2019. In 2017, the Games were again rescheduled, this time for 2020, and Peru resigned to host the Games, giving way to Sucre, Bolivia being named as the new host city on 10 November 2017.

Early 2019, the Games were scheduled to be held between 17 April and 1 May 2020, but were then rescheduled for 17–30 October 2020 due to the 2019 Bolivian protests, and later for 5–18 December 2020 due to the COVID-19 pandemic. In May 2020, ODEBO decided to reschedule the games from 24 April to 7 May 2021 and in December 2020 it rescheduled the event again, this time from 27 November to 9 December 2021 at the request of the Organizing Committee due to the health emergency caused by the COVID-19 pandemic prevailing at that time.

In October 2021, the Games were postponed to 2022 due to lack of funding and to avoid a clash with the 2021 Junior Pan American Games (25 November–5 December). In April 2022, ODEBO and Bolivian authorities reactivate the organization of the event, setting April 2023 as the new date for the Games. In August 2022, ODEBO's President Baltazar Medina confirmed the First Bolivarian Youth Games in Sucre from 30 November–9 December 2023 as new tentative dates, which were confirmed in January 2023. Finally, in April 2023, the Games were rescheduled for the last time to take place between 5 and 14 April 2024 in order to allow more time for the organization and to coincide with Sucre's bicentennial commemorative activities.

== Venues ==
These are the venues confirmed to host the games:

- Coliseo Municipal Max Toledo – Badminton.
- Coliseo Jorge Revilla Aldana – 3x3 basketball, Table tennis and Volleyball.
- Coliseo Universitario N° 1 – Boxing and Taekwondo.
- Complejo de Raquetas Conrrado Moscoso – Basque pelota and Squash.
- Complejo de Tenis La Madona – Tennis
- Complejo Deportivo Garcilazo – Archery, Baseball5, Beach volleyball, Futsal, Handball and Cycling BMX racing.
- Circuito Bolivariano El Rollo – Triathlon (cycling and running).
- Estadio Olímpico Patria – Athletics, Karate, Racquetball, Weightlifting and Wrestling.
- Piscina Bolivariana El Rollo – Swimming and Triathlon (swimming).
- Poligimnasio Max Toledo – Artistic gymnastics, Fencing and Judo.
- Sucre-Potosi route – Road cycling
- Cerro Churuquella – Mountain biking.

== The Games ==
=== Participating National Olympic Committees ===
All 7 ODEBO's National Olympic Committees (NOCs) will participate in these games. Each NOC was able to enter a maximum of 200 athletes, with the exception of the host, which was entitled to enter up to 300 athletes. Numbers in brackets denote the number of athletes being sent to the Games.

- Bolivia (238)
- Chile (184)
- Colombia (162)
- Ecuador (101)
- Panama (69)
- Peru (185)
- (International Olympic Committee) Team ODEBO (1)
- Venezuela (197)

=== Sports ===
The original 2020 games program proposed 25 sports in 31 disciplines. The final 2024 program feature 24 sports in 27 disciplines with the following changes regarding the original program: Football and Softball were replaced by Futsal and Baseball5 while Shooting was removed from the program.

Numbers in parentheses indicate the number of medal events to be contested in each sport/discipline.

- 3x3 basketball (2)
- Archery (6)
- Athletics (43)
- Badminton (5)
- Baseball5 (1)
- Basque pelota (4)
- Boxing (10)
- Cycling
  - BMX racing (2)
  - Mountain biking (2)
  - Road cycling (4)
- Fencing (7)
- Futsal (1)
- Gymnastics
  - Artistic gymnastics (14)
- Handball (1)
- Judo (8)
- Karate (8)
- Racquetball (5)
- Squash (7)
- Swimming (38)
- Table tennis (5)
- Taekwondo (15)
- Tennis (5)
- Triathlon (3)
- Volleyball
  - Beach volleyball (2)
  - Volleyball (1)
- Weightlifting (20)
- Wrestling
  - Freestyle wrestling (10)
  - Greco-Roman wrestling (5)

=== Schedule ===
The competition schedule is as follows:

OC	Opening ceremony	●	Event competitions	1	Gold medal events	CC	Closing ceremony

Sports		April											Events
Sports		4th Thu	5th Fri	6th Sat	7th Sun	8th Mon	9th Tue	10th Wed	11th Thu	12th Fri	13th Sat	14th Mon	Events
Ceremonies		OC										CC	—N/a
3x3 basketball				●	2								2
Archery										2	●	4	6
Athletics									13	9	9	12	43
Badminton		●	●	●	5								5
Baseball5		●	●	1									1
Basque pelota		●	●	4									4
Boxing								●	●	●	10		10
Cycling	BMX racing			2									2
Cycling	Mountain biking										2		2
Cycling	Road cycling				2				2				4
Fencing			3	3	1								7
Futsal										●	●	1	1
Gymnastics	Artistic gymnastics		1	1	5	7							14
Handball			●	●	1								1
Judo										4	4		8
Karate						●	4	4					8
Racquetball									●	●	4	1	5
Squash								●	●	4	3		7
Table tennis		●	1	2	2								5
Taekwondo			7	6	2								15
Tennis				●	●	2	3						5
Triathlon									2	1			3
Swimming			10	7	6	15							38
Volleyball	Beach volleyball	●	●	●	2								2
Volleyball	Volleyball							●	●	●	2		2
Weightlifting		7	6	7									20
Wrestling										5	5	5	15
Daily medal events		7	28	33	28	24	7	4	17	25	38	23	234
Cumulative total		7	35	68	96	120	127	131	148	173	211	234	234
April		4th Thu	5th Fri	6th Sat	7th Sun	8th Mon	9th Tue	10th Wed	11th Thu	12th Fri	13th Sat	14th Mon	Total events

== Medal table ==
* Host nation (Bolivia)

Rank	NOC	Gold	Silver	Bronze	Total
1	Colombia	73	51	55	179
2	Venezuela	63	48	46	157
3	Chile	30	40	47	117
4	Ecuador	25	32	32	89
5	Peru	20	26	54	100
6	Bolivia*	9	19	39	67
7	Panama	7	7	11	25
8	Team ODEBO	0	1	0	1
Totals (8 entries)		227	224	284	735

Source: I Bolivarian Youth Games Sucre 2024 – Medal table
