= Handball at the 2024 Bolivarian Youth Games =

Tournament details
- Host country: Bolivia
- Venue: 1 (in 1 host city)
- Dates: 5 – 4 April
- Teams: 4 (from 1 confederation)

Handball competition of the 2024 Bolivarian Youth Games consisted only of the women's tournament and was held from 5 to 7 April at the Coliseo Polideportivo Garcilazo, Sucre, Bolivia. The champion of the tournament was the national team of Chile.

== Participating teams ==
Women

- Bolivia
- Chile
- Peru
- Venezuela

== Medalists ==
Event	Gold	Silver	Bronze
Women's tournament	Chile; Anaís Leonor Larenas Cuevas; Antonia Catalina Millán Longoni; Catalina González Barrientos; Colomba Canessa González; Daniela Asenjo Thomson; Estefania Baeza Benavides; Isabella Victoria Gore Maclean; Isidora Valdivieso Sepúlveda; Ivonnee Rojas Núñez; Noelia Carrasco Vrsalovic; Renata Campos Navarro; Renata Paz Lizana Patterson	Venezuela; Angely Isabella Ramos Montilla; Elimar Yuribi Machado Ocanto; Enmary Gutierrez Hospedales; Greimar Cilie Palacios Pacheco; Keilimar Perez Mindiola; Luisyeri Hernandez Lozano; Massiel Alejandra Loyo Monjes; Mayerling Gomez Arreaza; Nilda Tahis Perez Traviezo; Oscarly Andreina Guilarte Arias; Rosmerlys Mendez Lozada; Yohandely Ramos Mendoza	Peru; Adriana Betsy Manchego Ccori; Alexa Valentina Romero Garay; Allessandra Cama Caballero; Angela Estefany Lopez Puma; Carolina Portocarrero Lioo; Dayanna Perez Chinchay; Estefani Rosado Vilchez; Karla Olenka Romero Ramirez; Lucia Fernandez Valdez; Luciana Valeri Arge Martinez; Marcia Morvelli De La Vega; Mia Alessa Chavez Vidal

== Women's tournament ==
Pos	Team	Pld	W	D	L	GF	GA	GD	Pts
1st place, gold medalist(s)	Chile	6	6	0	0	273	71	+202	12
2nd place, silver medalist(s)	Venezuela	6	4	0	2	159	129	+30	8
3rd place, bronze medalist(s)	Peru	6	2	0	4	126	186	−60	4
4	Bolivia (H)	6	0	0	6	48	220	−172	0

Source: Sucre 2024
Rules for classification: 1) points; 2) head-to-head points; 3) head-to-head goal difference; 4) head-to-head number of goals scored; 5) goal difference.
(H) Hosts

All times are local (UTC−4).

5 April 2024; 09:00	Chile	42–11	Peru	Coliseo Polideportivo Garcilazo, Sucre
5 April 2024; 09:00		(22–4)		Coliseo Polideportivo Garcilazo, Sucre

5 April 2024; 11:o0	Venezuela	31–9	Bolivia	Coliseo Polideportivo Garcilazo, Sucre
5 April 2024; 11:o0		(10–4)		Coliseo Polideportivo Garcilazo, Sucre

5 April 2024; 18:00	Peru	21–26	Venezuela	Coliseo Polideportivo Garcilazo, Sucre
5 April 2024; 18:00		(13–14)		Coliseo Polideportivo Garcilazo, Sucre

5 April 2024; 20:00	Bolivia	7–53	Chile	Coliseo Polideportivo Garcilazo, Sucre
5 April 2024; 20:00		(6–26)		Coliseo Polideportivo Garcilazo, Sucre

6 April 2024; 09:00	Bolivia	12–27	Peru	Coliseo Polideportivo Garcilazo, Sucre
6 April 2024; 09:00		(7–15)		Coliseo Polideportivo Garcilazo, Sucre

6 April 2024; 11:00	Chile	36–18	Venezuela	Coliseo Polideportivo Garcilazo, Sucre
6 April 2024; 11:00		(16–9)		Coliseo Polideportivo Garcilazo, Sucre

6 April 2024; 18:00	Peru	10–61	Chile	Coliseo Polideportivo Garcilazo, Sucre
6 April 2024; 18:00		(8–31)		Coliseo Polideportivo Garcilazo, Sucre

6 April 2024; 20:00	Bolivia	7–27	Venezuela	Coliseo Polideportivo Garcilazo, Sucre
6 April 2024; 20:00		(5–15)		Coliseo Polideportivo Garcilazo, Sucre

7 April 2024; 09:00	Venezuela	34–23	Peru	Coliseo Polideportivo Garcilazo, Sucre
7 April 2024; 09:00		(15–12)		Coliseo Polideportivo Garcilazo, Sucre

7 April 2024; 11:00	Chile	48–2	Bolivia	Coliseo Polideportivo Garcilazo, Sucre
7 April 2024; 11:00		(26–2)		Coliseo Polideportivo Garcilazo, Sucre

7 April 2024; 18:00	Bolivia	11–34	Peru	Coliseo Polideportivo Garcilazo, Sucre
7 April 2024; 18:00		(6–14)		Coliseo Polideportivo Garcilazo, Sucre

7 April 2024; 20:00	Chile	33–23	Venezuela	Coliseo Polideportivo Garcilazo, Sucre
7 April 2024; 20:00		(19–10)		Coliseo Polideportivo Garcilazo, Sucre
