= Futsal at the 2024 Bolivarian Youth Games =

Futsal competitions at the 2024 Bolivarian Youth Games

- Futsal pictogram
- Venue: Complejo Deportivo Garcilazo
- Location: Sucre, Bolivia
- Dates: 12–14 April 2024
- Competitors: 40 from 4 nations
- Teams: 4

Medalists
gold medal	Venezuela
silver medal	Chile
bronze medal	Peru

Futsal competition at the 2024 Bolivarian Youth Games in Sucre, Bolivia was held from 12 to 14 April 2024 at Complejo Deportivo Garcilazo.

The boys' tournament was the only event scheduled to be contested. A total of 40 athletes (10 per team) competed in the event. Athletes had to be born between 1 January 2006 and 31 December 2008 to be eligible (ages 16 to 18).

Venezuela won the boys' tournament and claimed the only gold medal of the futsal event.

== Participating nations ==
A total of 4 National Olympic Committees (NOCs) registered athletes for the futsal competitions. Each NOC was able to enter a maximum of 10 futsal players in their team squad.

Numbers in parentheses indicate the number of players entered the competition by each NOC.

- Bolivia (10)
- Chile (10)
- Peru (10)
- Venezuela (10)

== Medal summary ==
=== Medal table ===
* Host nation (Bolivia)

Rank	NOC	Gold	Silver	Bronze	Total
1	Venezuela (VEN)	1	0	0	1
2	Chile (CHI)	0	1	0	1
3	Peru (PER)	0	0	1	1
Totals (3 entries)		1	1	1	3

Source: I Bolivarian Youth Games Sucre 2024 – Futsal medals

=== Medalists ===
Event	Gold	Silver	Bronze
Boys' tournament	Venezuela; Juan José Carrillo; Yonfre Rodríguez; Carlos Neus; Alejandro Ledezma; Reinaldo Villa; Víctor Manuel Figueroa; David Cabello; Aaron Ruiz; Leonardo Lezama; Diego Medina	Chile; Bairont Morales; Johans Carrasco; Moisés Vargas; Daniel Jamett; Yoshua Jara; Francisco Andrade; Milan Kalazich; Fabián Arredondo; Martín Rojas; Fabián Barría	Peru; Alonso Nole; Anival Santillán; Josimar López; Elías Pérez; Jonathan Cruz; César Fretel; Jostin Guerra; Fabrizio Via Stuat; Luis Pablo Cóndor; César Huerta

== Boys' tournament ==
2024 Bolivarian Youth Games Boys' Futsal tournament
Tournament details
- Host country: Bolivia
- City: Sucre
- Dates: 12–14 April 2024
- Teams: 4 (from 1 confederation)
- Venue: 1 (in 1 host city)

Final positions
- Champions: Venezuela (1st title)
- Runners-up: Chile
- Third place: Peru
- Fourth place: Bolivia

Tournament statistics
- Matches played: 6
- Goals scored: 46 (7.67 per match)
- Top scorer: (Venezuela) Leonardo Lezama (8 goals)

The tournament consisted of a single group of 4 teams in which each team played once against the other 3 teams in the group on a single round-robin basis. The top three teams will be awarded gold, silver and bronze medals, respectively.

Venezuela secured the gold medal at the end of the second matchday when they defeated Peru 4–3, which gave them the advantage in the head-to-head criterion (first tie-breaker in case of equal points) against this same rival, which was the only one that could equal them in points in the last matchday.

All match times are local times, BOT (UTC−4).

=== Standings ===
Pos	Team	Pld	W	D	L	GF	GA	GD	Pts	Final result
1st place, gold medalist(s)	Venezuela	3	2	1	0	13	8	+5	7	Gold medal
2nd place, silver medalist(s)	Chile	3	1	1	1	13	15	−2	4	Silver medal
3rd place, bronze medalist(s)	Peru	3	1	0	2	10	12	−2	3	Bronze medal
4	Bolivia (H)	3	0	2	1	10	11	−1	2	Fourth place

Source: COBOL Sucre 2024
Rules for classification: Tie-breakers
(H) Hosts

=== Matches ===
12 April 2024
18:00

Chile	2–6	Venezuela
Moisés Vargas 24'; Martín Rojas 13'	Report	Aaron Ruiz 10'; Alejandro Ledezma 14'; Leonardo Lezama 25', 26', 33', 40'

Complejo Deportivo Garcilazo
Referee: Rolando Bermúdez (Colombia)
12 April 2024
19:45

Bolivia	2–3	Peru
Agustín Flores 14'; Fabricio Siani 37'	Report	Fabrizio Via Stuat 16', 37', 38'

Complejo Deportivo Garcilazo
Referee: Feliciano Fariña (Paraguay)

13 April 2024
18:00

Peru	2–3	Venezuela
Fabrizio Via Stuat 15'; César Fretel 27'; Luis Pablo Cóndor 31'	Report	Leonardo Lezama 26', 34'; Carlos Neus 27'; Aaron Ruiz 38'

Complejo Deportivo Garcilazo
Referee: Henry Gutiérrez (Bolivia)
13 April 2024
19:45

Bolivia	4–4	Chile
Waldo Paniagua 12'; Giordan Vargas 22'; Jhoan Rea 26'; Alejandro medina 39'	Report	Johans Carrasco 13', 15', 24'; Daniel Jamett 23'

Complejo Deportivo Garcilazo
Referee: Daniel Villacis (Ecuador)

14 April 2024
11:00

Peru	5–7	Chile
Jostin Guerra 14'; César Huerta 17'; Fabrizio Via Stuat 22'; Luis Pablo Cóndor 24'; Anival Santillán 26'	Report	Francisco Andrade 8'; Yoshua Jara 13'; Martín Rojas 29'; Milan Kalazich 31', 36', 38'; Moisés Vargas 31'

Complejo Deportivo Garcilazo
Referee: Daniel Villacis (Ecuador)
14 April 2024
12:45

Bolivia	4–4	Venezuela
Agustín Flores 6'; Waldo Paniagua 11'; Álvaro Garrido 19'; Alejandro Medina 30'	Report	Leonardo Lezama 10', 26'; Diego Medina 25', 35'

Complejo Deportivo Garcilazo
Referee: Feliciano Fariña (Paraguay)
