= Basque pelota at the 2024 Bolivarian Youth Games =

Basque pelota competitions at the 2024 Bolivarian Youth Games

- Basque pelota pictogram
- Venue: Cancha Municipal Max Toledo
- Dates: 4–6 April 2024
- Competitors: 22 from 4 nations

Basque pelota competitions at the 2024 Bolivarian Youth Games in Sucre, Bolivia were held from 4 to 6 April 2024 at Complejo de Raquetas Conrrado Moscoso.

Four medal events were scheduled to be contested: frontball for both boys and girls, doubles frontenis for girls and individual hand fronton 36 metres for boys. A total of 22 athletes (9 boys and 13 girls) competed in the events. Athletes had to be born between 1 January 2005 and 31 December 2008 to be eligible (ages 16 to 19).

== Participating nations ==
A total of 4 National Olympic Committees (NOCs) registered athletes for the basque pelota competitions. Each NOC was able to enter a maximum of 8 pelotaris (4 per gender), with up to two pelotaris for each boys and girls singles events and one only pair for the girls' doubles event.

Numbers in parentheses indicate the number of pelotaris entered the competition by each NOC.

- Bolivia (8)
- Chile (5)
- Peru (5)
- Venezuela (4)

=== Teams ===
Although the frontball and hand fronton 36 meter events were individual competitions, each NOC could enter a single team of two pelotaris with one starter and one alternate in each match. Girls' doubles frontenis allowed a third pelotari to be entered as an alternate in each match. Pelotaris were allowed to compete in up to two events.

The following pelotaris participated (and/or were alternates) in two events:

Pelotari	Boys' frontball	Girls' frontball	Doubles frontenis	Hand fronton 36 meter
(Chile) Renato Bolelli	Yes			Yes
(Chile) Marcos Loaiza	Yes			Yes
(Chile) Florencia Peña		Yes	Yes	
(Peru) Jesús Poma	Yes			Yes
(Peru) Jhojan Quinto	Yes			Yes
(Venezuela) Victoria Febres		Yes	Yes	
(Venezuela) Rosmaris León		Yes	Yes	

== Medal summary ==
=== Medal table ===
* Host nation (Bolivia)

Rank	NOC	Gold	Silver	Bronze	Total
1	Peru (PER)	1	3	0	4
2	Chile (CHI)	1	1	1	3
3	Bolivia (BOL)*	1	0	2	3
4	Venezuela (VEN)	1	0	1	2
Totals (4 entries)		4	4	4	12

Source: I Bolivarian Youth Games Sucre 2024 – Basque pelota medals

=== Medalists ===
Event	Gold	Silver	Bronze
Boys' frontball	Chile; Renato Bolelli; Marcos Loaiza	Peru; Jesús Poma; Jhojan Quinto	Venezuela; Junior Delgado
Girls' frontball	Venezuela; Rosmaris León; Victoria Febres	Peru; Cristina Núñez	Bolivia; Ruby Bejarano; Abigaíl Mena
Girls' doubles frontenis	Peru; Grecia Febres; Nicole Armestar	Chile; Florencia Peña; Mónica Escalona	Bolivia; Estefania Vedia; Gabriela Cardozo
Individual hand fronton	Bolivia; José Soliz; Jherson Laura	Peru; Jhojan Quinto; Jesús Poma	Chile; Marcos Loaiza; Renato Bolelli

== Results ==
=== Boys' frontball ===
==== Classification round ====
Pos	Team	Pld	W	L	GF	GA	GD	PF	PA	PD	Pts	Qualification
1	Chile (CHI)	3	3	0	6	0	+6	60	7	+53	3	Gold medal match
2	Peru (PER)	3	2	1	4	2	+2	41	36	+5	2	Gold medal match
3	Venezuela (VEN)	3	1	2	2	5	−3	35	58	−23	1	Bronze medal match
4	Bolivia (BOL) (H)	3	0	3	1	6	−5	27	62	−35	0	Bronze medal match

(H) Host

Date	Time		Score		Set 1	Set 2	Set 3	Total	Report
4 Apr	10:30	José Cardozo (Bolivia)	0–2	(Peru) Jesús Poma	6–10	0–10		6–20	
4 Apr	11:00	Renato Bolelli (Chile)	2–0	(Venezuela) Junior Delgado	10–3	10–0		20–3	Report
5 Apr	12:30	Renato Bolelli (Chile)	2–0	(Bolivia) José Cardozo	10–2	10–1		20–3	Report
5 Apr	13:00	Jesús Poma (Peru)	2–0	(Venezuela) Junior Delgado	10–7	10–3		20–10	Report
5 Apr	14:30	Renato Bolelli (Chile)	2–0	(Peru) Jhojan Quinto	10–0	10–1		20–1	Report
5 Apr	15:00	Junior Delgado (Venezuela)	2–1	(Bolivia) Diego Escalera	7–10	10–8	5–0	22–18	Report

==== Bronze medal match ====
Date	Time		Score		Set 1	Set 2	Set 3	Total	Report
6 Apr	9:50	Junior Delgado (Venezuela)	2–1	(Bolivia) Diego Escalera	9–10	10–6	5–1	24–17	Report

==== Gold medal match ====
Date	Time		Score		Set 1	Set 2	Set 3	Total	Report
6 Apr	12:20	Renato Bolelli (Chile)	2–1	(Peru) Jesús Poma	10–2	6–10		5–4	Report

=== Girls' frontball ===
==== Classification round ====
Pos	Team	Pld	W	L	GF	GA	GD	PF	PA	PD	Pts	Qualification
1	Venezuela (VEN)	3	3	0	6	1	+5	61	35	+26	3	Gold medal match
2	Peru (PER)	3	2	1	5	3	+2	60	51	+9	2	Gold medal match
3	Chile (CHI)	3	1	2	3	4	−1	41	57	−16	1	Bronze medal match
4	Bolivia (BOL) (H)	3	0	3	0	6	−6	41	60	−19	0	Bronze medal match

(H) Host

Date	Time		Score		Set 1	Set 2	Set 3	Total	Report
4 Apr	11:30	Kemberly Horta (Chile)	1–2	(Peru) Cristina Núñez	10–8	5–10	1–5	16–23	
4 Apr	12:00	Rosmaris León (Venezuela)	2–0	(Bolivia) Ruby Bejarano	10–7	10–6		20–13	
5 Apr	13:30	Kemberly Horta (Chile)	2–0	(Bolivia) Ruby Bejarano	10–7	10–7		20–14	
5 Apr	14:00	Cristina Núñez (Peru)	1–2	(Venezuela) Rosmaris León	10–6	5–10	2–5	17–21	Report
5 Apr	15:30	Ruby Bejarano (Bolivia)	0–2	(Peru) Cristina Núñez	6–10	8–10		14–20	Report
5 Apr	16:00	Rosmaris León (Venezuela)	2–0	(Chile) Kemberly Horta	10–3	10–2		20–5	Report

==== Bronze medal match ====
Date	Time		Score		Set 1	Set 2	Set 3	Total	Report
6 Apr	10:40	Kemberly Horta (Chile)	0–2	(Bolivia) Abigaíl Mena	5–10	2–10		7–20	Report

==== Gold medal match ====
Date	Time		Score		Set 1	Set 2	Set 3	Total	Report
6 Apr	13:10	Rosmaris León (Venezuela)	2–0	(Peru) Cristina Núñez	10–3	10–6		20–9	Report

=== Girls' doubles frontenis ===
Pos	Team	Pld	W	L	GF	GA	GD	PF	PA	PD	Pts	Qualification
1	Peru (PER)	3	3	0	6	0	+6	90	36	+54	3	Gold medal match
2	Chile (CHI)	3	2	1	4	2	+2	69	66	+3	2	Gold medal match
3	Bolivia (BOL) (H)	3	1	2	2	4	−2	62	81	−19	1	Bronze medal match
4	Venezuela (VEN)	3	0	3	0	6	−6	52	90	−38	0	Bronze medal match

(H) Host

Date	Time		Score		Set 1	Set 2	Set 3	Total	Report
4 Apr	9:00	Vedia–Cardozo (Bolivia)	0–2	(Chile) Peña–Escalona	10–15	9–15		19–30	
4 Apr	9:45	Febres–Armestar (Peru)	2–0	(Venezuela) Gómez–Febres	15–6	15–8		30–14	
5 Apr	9:30	Vedia–Cardozo (Bolivia)	0–2	(Peru) Febres–Armestar	6–15	7–15		13–30	Report
5 Apr	10:15	Peña–Escalona (Chile)	2–0	(Venezuela) Gómez–Febres	15–9	15–8		30–17	Report
5 Apr	11:00	Peña–Escalona (Chile)	0–2	(Peru) Armestar–Febres	5–15	4–15		9–30	Report
5 Apr	11:45	Vedia–Cardozo (Bolivia)	2–0	(Venezuela) León–Febres	15–11	15–10		30–21	Report

==== Bronze medal match ====
Date	Time		Score		Set 1	Set 2	Set 3	Total	Report
6 Apr	9:00	Vedia–Cardozo (Bolivia)	2–0	(Venezuela) Gómez–Febres	15–11	15–10		30–21	Report

==== Gold medal match ====
Date	Time		Score		Set 1	Set 2	Set 3	Total	Report
6 Apr	11:30	Febres–Armestar (Peru)	2–0	(Chile) Peña–Escalona	15–9	15–9		30–18	Report

=== Individual hand fronton ===
==== Classification round ====
Pos	Team	Pld	W	L	GF	GA	GD	PF	PA	PD	Pts	Qualification
1	Bolivia (BOL) (H)	2	2	0	4	0	+4	40	4	+36	2	Gold medal match
2	Peru (PER)	2	1	1	2	2	0	21	26	−5	1	Gold medal match
3	Chile (CHI)	2	0	2	0	4	−4	9	40	−31	0	Bronze medal

(H) Host

Date	Time		Score		Set 1	Set 2	Set 3	Total	Report
4 Apr	12:30	José Soliz (Bolivia)	2–0	(Peru) Jhojan Quinto	10–0	10–1		20–1	
5 Apr	9:00	Jesús Poma (Peru)	2–0	(Chile) Marcos Loaiza	10–4	10–2		20–6	Report
5 Apr	16:30	Jherson Laura (Bolivia)	2–0	(Chile) Marcos Loaiza	10–2	10–1		20–3	Report

==== Gold medal match ====
Date	Time		Score		Set 1	Set 2	Set 3	Total	Report
6 Apr	14:00	José Soliz (Bolivia)	2–0	(Peru) Jhojan Quinto	10–0	10–7		20–7	Report
