= Badminton at the 2024 Bolivarian Youth Games =

Badminton competitions at the 2024 Bolivarian Youth Games

- Badminton pictogram
- Venue: Cancha Municipal Max Toledo
- Dates: 4–7 April 2024
- Competitors: 21 from 6 nations

Champions
- Peru (5 gold medals)

Badminton competitions at the 2024 Bolivarian Youth Games in Sucre, Bolivia were held from 4 to 7 April 2024 at Coliseo Municipal Max Toledo.

Five medal events were scheduled to be contested: singles and doubles for both boys and girls and mixed doubles. A total of 21 athletes (11 men and 10 women) competed in the events. Athletes had to be born between 1 January 2005 and 31 December 2006 to be eligible (ages 18 to 19).

Peru dominated the badminton event by winning the 5 gold medals that were at stake, in addition to 2 silver medals and one bronze medal.

== Schedule ==
The competitions were held over a 4-day period:

R16	Round of 16	QF	Quarter-finals	SF	Semi-finals	M	Medal matches

Date Event	Thu 4	Mon 5	Tue 6	Wed 7
Boys' singles	R16	QF	SF	M
Boys' doubles		QF	SF	M
Girls' singles	R16	QF	SF	M
Girls' doubles		QF	SF	M
Mixed doubles	R16	QF	SF	M

== Participating nations ==
A total of 6 National Olympic Committees (NOCs) registered athletes for the badminton competitions. Each NOC was able to enter a maximum of 4 badminton players (2 per gender).

Numbers in parentheses indicate the number of players entered the competition by each NOC.

- Bolivia (4)
- Chile (4)
- Colombia (4)
- Ecuador (1)
- Peru (4)
- Venezuela (4)

== Medal summary ==
=== Medal table ===
* Host nation (Bolivia)

Rank	NOC	Gold	Silver	Bronze	Total
1	Peru (PER)	5	2	1	8
2	Chile (CHI)	0	1	3	4
3	Venezuela (VEN)	0	1	2	3
4	Ecuador (ECU)	0	1	0	1
5	Colombia (COL)	0	0	3	3
6	Bolivia (BOL)*	0	0	1	1
Totals (6 entries)		5	5	10	20

Source: I Bolivarian Youth Games Sucre 2024 – Badminton medals

=== Medalists ===
Event	Gold	Silver	Bronze
Boys' singles	Sharum Durand; Peru	Henry Huebla; Ecuador	José María Rendón; Peru
Boys' singles	Sharum Durand; Peru	Henry Huebla; Ecuador	Nicolás Monne; Chile
Boys' doubles	Sharum Durand; José María Rendón; Peru	Gustavo Albornoz; Abraham Gutiérrez; Venezuela	Nicolás Morales; Sergio Zapata; Colombia
Boys' doubles	Sharum Durand; José María Rendón; Peru	Gustavo Albornoz; Abraham Gutiérrez; Venezuela	Nicolás Monne; Bruno Mora; Chile
Girls' singles	Namie Miyahira; Peru	Fernanda Munar; Peru	Mariangel García; Venezuela
Girls' singles	Namie Miyahira; Peru	Fernanda Munar; Peru	Rosa Quilodrán; Chile
Girls' doubles	Namie Miyahira; Fernanda Munar; Peru	Camila Astorga; Rosa Quilodrán; Chile	Verónica Condori; Melanie Salvatierra; Bolivia
Girls' doubles	Namie Miyahira; Fernanda Munar; Peru	Camila Astorga; Rosa Quilodrán; Chile	Mariangel García; Lusbeth Sánchez; Venezuela
Mixed doubles	Fernanda Munar; José María Rendón; Peru	Sharum Durand; Namie Miyahira; Peru	Laura Galeano; Nicolás Morales; Colombia
Mixed doubles	Fernanda Munar; José María Rendón; Peru	Sharum Durand; Namie Miyahira; Peru	Sara Hurtado; Sergio Zapata; Colombia

== Results ==
The 5 events were played on a single-elimination basis and consisted of round of 16 (except for the boys' and girls' doubles events which started in the quarterfinals round), quarter-finals, semi-finals and the gold medal match. All semi-final losers were awarded bronze medals.

One round was held per day, from 4 to 7 April.

=== Boys' singles ===
Two players were given seeds:

- Henry Huebla (ECU) [1] (final, silver medalist)
- Sharum Durand (PER) [2] (champion, gold medalist)

Round of 16
Gustavo Albornoz (VEN)	19	13	0
José María Rendón (PER)	21	21	2
Sergio Zapata (COL)	21	21	2
Bruno Mora (CHI)	8	10	0
Abraham Gutiérrez (VEN)	17	21	17	1
Nicolás Monne (CHI)	21	16	21	2

Quarter-finals
Henry Huebla (ECU)	21	21	2
Romel Colque (BOL)	6	10	0
José María Rendón (PER)	21	21	2
Sergio Zapata (COL)	17	12	0
Nicolás Monne (CHI)	21	21	2
Gabriel Rosales (BOL)	17	16	0
Nicolás Morales (COL)	9	19	0
Sharum Durand (PER)	21	21	2

Semi-finals
Henry Huebla (ECU)	21	24	2
José María Rendón (PER)	14	22	0
Nicolás Monne (CHI)	6	12	0
Sharum Durand (PER)	21	21	2

Gold medal match
Henry Huebla (ECU)	14	19	0
Sharum Durand (PER)	21	21	2

=== Girls' singles ===
Two players were given seeds:

- Namie Miyahira (PER) [1] (champion, gold medalist)
- Fernanda Munar (PER) [2] (final, silver medalist)

Round of 16
Rosa Quilodrán (CHI)	21	21	2
Lusbeth Sánchez (VEN)	8	13	0
Melanie Salvatierra (BOL)	5	4	0
Laura Galeano (COL)	21	21	2

Quarter-finals
Namie Miyahira (PER)	21	21	2
Verónica Condori (BOL)	4	9	0
Sara Hurtado (COL)	14	21	21	1
Rosa Quilodrán (CHI)	21	17	23	2
Laura Galeano (COL)	21	11	14	1
Mariangel García (VEN)	17	21	21	2
Camila Astorga (CHI)	4	7	0
Fernanda Munar (PER)	21	21	2

Semi-finals
Namie Miyahira (PER)	21	21	2
Rosa Quilodrán (CHI)	11	18	0
Mariangel García (VEN)	5	9	0
Fernanda Munar (PER)	21	21	2

Gold medal match
Namie Miyahira (PER)	21	21	2
Fernanda Munar (PER)	10	10	0

=== Boys' doubles ===
Two pairs were given seeds:

- Sharum Durand – José María Rendón (PER) [1] (champion, gold medalist)
- Gustavo Albornoz – Abraham Gutiérrez (VEN) [2] (final, silver medalist)

Quarter-finals
B Mora – N Monne (CHI)	21	21	2
R Colque – G Rosales (BOL)	13	11	0

Semi-finals
S Durand – JM Rendón (PER)	21	21	2
N Morales – S Zapata (COL)	16	18	0
B Mora – N Monne (CHI)	13	13	0
G Albornoz – A Gutiérrez (VEN)	21	21	2

Gold medal match
S Durand – JM Rendón (PER)	21	21	2
G Albornoz – A Gutiérrez (VEN)	11	9	0

=== Girls' doubles ===
Two pairs were given seeds:

- Namie Miyahira – Fernanda Munar (PER) [1] (champion, gold medalist)
- Camila Astorga – Rosa Quilodrán (CHI) [2] (final, silver medalist)

Quarter-finals – 5 April
M García – L Sánchez (VEN)	13	21	21	2
L Galeano – S Hurtado (COL)	21	19	19	1

Semi-finals – 6 April
N Miyahira – F Munar (PER)	21	21	3
V Condori – M Salvatierra (BOL)	3	8	0
M García – L Sánchez (VEN)	8	13	0
C Astorga – R Quilodrán (CHI)	21	21	2

Gold medal match – 7 April
N Miyahira – F Munar (PER)	21	21	2
C Astorga – R Quilodrán (CHI)	16	13	0

=== Mixed doubles ===
Two pairs were given seeds:

- Sharum Durand – Namie Miyahira (PER) [1] (final, silver medalist)
- Fernanda Munar – José María Rendón (PER) [2] (champion, gold medalist)

Round of 16
R Colque – M Salvatierra (BOL)	8	9	0
L Galeano – N Morales (COL)	21	21	2
V Condori – G Rosales (BOL)	13	7	0
S Hurtado – S Zapata (COL)	21	21	2

Quarter-finals
S Durand – N Miyahira (PER)	21	21	2
M García – A Gutiérrez (VEN)	19	18	0
C Astorga – B Mora (CHI)	16	15	0
L Galeano – N Morales (COL)	21	21	2
S Hurtado – S Zapata (COL)	21	21	2
N Monne – R Quilodrán (CHI)	15	12	0
G Albornoz – L Sánchez (VEN)	13	10	0
F Munar – JM Rendón (PER)	21	21	2

Semi-finals
S Durand – N Miyahira (PER)	21	21	2
L Galeano – N Morales (COL)	8	19	0
S Hurtado – S Zapata (COL)	8	21	12	1
F Munar – JM Rendón (PER)	21	17	21	2

Gold medal match
S Durand – N Miyahira (PER)	20	19	0
F Munar – JM Rendón (PER)	22	21	2
