= Swimming at the 2024 Bolivarian Youth Games =

Swimming competitions at the 2024 Bolivarian Youth Games

- Swimming pictogram
- Venue: Piscina Bolivariana El Rollo
- Dates: 5–8 April
- Competitors: 83 from 7 nations

Champions
- Venezuela (18 gold, 13 silver, 15 Bronze)

Swimming competitions at the 2024 Bolivarian Youth Games in Sucre, Bolivia were held from 5 to 8 April 2024 at Piscina Bolivariana El Rollo.

Thirty-eight medal events were scheduled to be contested: 34 events equally divided among boys and girls, 800 m and 1500 m freestyle for girls and boys respectively and two mixed relay events. A total of 83 athletes (43 boys and 40 girls) competed in the events. Athletes had to be born between 1 January 2006 and 31 December 2010 to be eligible (ages 14 to 18), according to World Aquatics.

Venezuela won the swimming competitions with a total of 46 medals, 18 gold, 16 silver and 15 bronze.

== Participating nations ==
All 7 ODEBO National Olympic Committees (NOCs) registered athletes for the swimming competitions. Each NOC was able to enter a maximum of 24 athletes (12 per gender), with up to two swimmers for each boys and girls individual events and one team for each relay event.

Numbers in parentheses indicate the number of swimmers entered the competition by each NOC.

- Bolivia (24)
- Chile (10)
- Colombia (14)
- Ecuador (6)
- Panama (6)
- Peru (6)
- Venezuela (17)

== Events ==
The following events were scheduled to be contested (all pool events are long course, and distances are in metres unless stated):

- Freestyle: 50, 100, 200, 400, 800 (only for girls), and 1,500 (only for boys);
- Backstroke: 50, 100 and 200;
- Breaststroke: 50, 100 and 200;
- Butterfly: 50, 100 and 200;
- Individual medley: 200 and 400;
- Relays: 4×100 free (including mixed), 4×100 medley (including mixed)

== Medal summary ==
=== Medal table ===
* Host nation (Bolivia)

Rank	NOC	Gold	Silver	Bronze	Total
1	Venezuela (VEN)	18	13	15	46
2	Colombia (COL)	10	12	10	32
3	Chile (CHI)	6	5	5	16
4	Bolivia (BOL)*	2	2	5	9
5	Peru (PER)	2	1	3	6
6	Ecuador (ECU)	0	5	1	6
Totals (6 entries)		38	38	39	115

Source: I Bolivarian Youth Games Sucre 2024 – Swimming medals

=== Medalists ===
==== Boys' events ====
Event	Gold		Silver		Bronze	
50 m freestyle	Dennis Pérez; Venezuela	23.67	Tomás Osorio; Colombia	23.69	Francisco Montaño; Venezuela	24.23
100 m freestyle	Dennis Pérez; Venezuela	51.34	Francisco Montaño; Venezuela	51.76	Juan David Blandón; Colombia	52.08
200 m freestyle	Dennis Pérez; Venezuela	1:55.18	Santiago Arteaga; Colombia	1:56.28	Francisco Montaño; Venezuela	1:56.29
400 m freestyle	Sergio Ybarra; Venezuela	4:11.03	Joseph Paz; Colombia	4:14.36	Vasco Asparria; Peru	4:15.71
1500 m freestyle	Sergio Ybarra; Venezuela	16:53.32	Juan Enrique Alcívar; Ecuador	17:04.45	Joseph Paz; Colombia	17:12.57
50 m backstroke	Edhy Vargas; Chile	27.16	Tomás Osorio; Colombia	27.54	Manuel Díaz; Venezuela	27.58
100 m backstroke	Simón Bermúdez; Colombia	57.45	Edhy Vargas; Chile	58.37	Agustín Góngora; Bolivia	59.49
200 m backstroke	Edhy Vargas; Chile	2:06.17	Simón Bermúdez; Colombia	2:11.81	Víctor Castillo; Venezuela	2:13.96
50 m breaststroke	Vicente Villanueva; Chile	29.03	Javier Colmenares; Venezuela	29.71	Juan José Giraldo; Colombia	29.74
100 m breaststroke	Vicente Villanueva; Chile	1:04.38	Juan José Giraldo; Colombia	1:04.50	Javier Colmenares; Venezuela	1:04.90
200 m breaststroke	Juan José Giraldo; Colombia	2:21.18	Vicente Villanueva; Chile	2:23.50	Javier Colmenares; Venezuela	2:26.72
50 m butterfly	Tomás Osorio; Colombia	24.90	Thiago Solares; Bolivia	25.79	Pedro Aguilera; Chile	25.81
100 m butterfly	Manuel Díaz; Venezuela	55.42	Juan David Blandón; Colombia	56.21	Agustín Góngora; Bolivia	57.16
200 m butterfly	Diego Caruci; Venezuela	2:06.58	Manuel Díaz; Venezuela	2:08.51	Vicente Flores; Peru	2:14.97
200 m individual medley	Manuel Díaz; Venezuela	2:09.29	Simón Bermúdez; Colombia	2:10.04	Javier Colmenares; Venezuela	2:10.92
400 m individual medley	Manuel Díaz; Venezuela	4:46.90	Sergio Ybarra; Venezuela	4:47.38	Vicente Villanueva; Chile	4:52.41
4 × 100 m freestyle relay	Venezuela; Dennis Pérez; Javier Colmenares; Manuel Díaz; Francisco Montaño	3:27.15	Colombia; Tomás Osorio; Juan David Blandón; Santiago Arteaga; Simón Bermúdez	3:28.29	Chile; Pedro Aguilera; Nicolás Álvarez; Edhy Vargas; Vicente Villanueva	3:37.19
4 × 100 m medley relay	Colombia; Juan José Giraldo; Juan David Blandón; Santiago Arteaga; Simón Bermúdez	3:50.37	Chile; Pedro Aguilera; Nicolás Álvarez; Edhy Vargas; Vicente Villanueva	3:52.28	Venezuela; Dennis Pérez; Víctor Castillo; Javier Colmenares; Manuel Díaz	3:53.82

==== Girls' events ====
Event	Gold		Silver		Bronze	
50 m freestyle	María Santana; Colombia	26.68	Nicole Gutiérrez; Venezuela	27.50	Camila Araujo; Venezuela	27.51
100 m freestyle	Fiorella Grossale; Venezuela	59.32	Tiffany Murillo; Colombia	59.40	Nicole Gutiérrez; Venezuela	1:00.58
200 m freestyle	Tiffany Murillo; Colombia	2:07.51	Danna Martínez; Ecuador	2:09.31	Nathalie Medina; Venezuela	2:10.17
400 m freestyle	Tiffany Murillo; Colombia	4:30.65	Danna Martínez; Ecuador	4:37.01	Nathalie Medina; Venezuela	4:44.14
800 m freestyle	Tiffany Murillo; Colombia	9:22.62	Danna Martínez; Ecuador	9:34.79	Nathalie Medina; Venezuela	9:46.59
50 m backstroke	Martina Röper; Chile	30.70	Camila Araujo; Venezuela	31.23	Juliana Romero; Colombia	31.39
100 m backstroke	Martina Röper; Chile	1:05.30	Juliana Romero; Colombia	1:06.93	Mónica Leydar; Venezuela	1:07.43
200 m backstroke	Mónica Leydar; Venezuela	2:25.78	Martina Röper; Chile	2:25.80	Juliana Romero; Colombia	2:28.74
50 m breaststroke	Isabella Berzal; Venezuela	33.13	Valeska Betancourt; Venezuela	34.62	Cristal Gómez; Colombia	35.03
50 m breaststroke	Isabella Berzal; Venezuela	33.13	Valeska Betancourt; Venezuela	34.62	Naiara Roca; Bolivia	35.03
100 m breaststroke	Naiara Roca; Bolivia	1:16.14	Isabella Berzal; Venezuela	1:16.37	Fernanda Pérez; Chile	1:17.23
200 m breaststroke	Naiara Roca; Bolivia	2:47.02	Valeska Betancourt; Venezuela	2:49.75	Isabella Moreno; Colombia	2:50.01
50 m butterfly	Yasmín Silva; Peru	28.63	Nicole Gutiérrez; Venezuela	28.73	María Santana; Colombia	28.87
100 m butterfly	Yasmín Silva; Peru	1:03.37	Elvira Espinosa; Ecuador	1:03.93	María José Orozco; Colombia	1:04.49
200 m butterfly	Mónica Leydar; Venezuela	2:19.30	Yasmín Silva; Peru	2:22.60	Elvira Espinosa; Ecuador	2:24.55
200 m individual medley	Mónica Leydar; Venezuela	2:26.67	Nicole Christensen; Venezuela	2:28.24	María Santana; Colombia	2:29.39
400 m individual medley	Tiffany Murillo; Colombia	5:08.11	Mónica Leydar; Venezuela	5:15.13	Nicole Christensen; Venezuela	5:28.28
4 × 100 m freestyle relay	Venezuela; Fiorella Grossale; Nicole Christensen; Nicole Gutiérrez; Nathalie Medina	4:00.36	Colombia; María Santana; Cristal Gómez; Tiffany Murillo; María José Orozco	4:02.37	Bolivia; Lucía Ordóñez; Bruna Antelo; Ana Fabia Ovando; Lorie Rojas	4:19.09
4 × 100 m medley relay	Venezuela; Fiorella Grossale; Mónica Leydar; Nicole Gutiérrez; Isabella Berzal	4:30.86	Bolivia; Lucía Ordóñez; Naiara Roca; Lorie Rojas; Caroline Nagashiro	4:42.92	Chile; Laura Fingerhuth; Elisa Shnapp; Fernanda Pérez; Martina Röper	4:51.09

==== Mixed events ====
Event	Gold		Silver		Bronze	
4 × 100 m freestyle relay	Colombia; María Santana; Tiffany Murillo; Juan David Blandón; Santiago Arteaga	3:41.30	Venezuela; Fiorella Grossale; Nicole Gutiérrez; Dennis Pérez; Francisco Montaño	3:45.23	Peru; Lia Espinosa; Ariana Moya; Vasco Asparria; Cristobal Amiel Buchholtz	3:52.36
4 × 100 m medley relay	Venezuela; Mónica Leydar; Nicole Gutiérrez; Javier Colmnares; Manuel Díaz	4:06.94	Chile; Pedro Aguilera; Vicente Villanueva; Fernanda Pérez; Martina Röper	4:11.56	Bolivia; Naiara Roca; Lorie Rojas; Agustín Góngora; Thiago Solares	4:18.28
