= Sixto Barrera =

Peruvian Greco-Roman wrestler

Personal information
- Born: September 17, 1983 (age 42)
Medal record
Men's Greco-Roman wrestling
Representing Peru
Pan American Games
Silver medal – second place	2007 Rio de Janeiro	Middleweight

Sixto César Barrera Ochoa (born September 17, 1983) is a sport wrestler born in Lima, Peru. He carried the Peruvian flag at the opening ceremony of the 2008 Olympics in Beijing, PR China. Barrera won a silver medal at the 2007 Pan American Games.

Olympic Games
Preceded by Francisco Boza	Flag bearer for Peru; Beijing 2008	Succeeded by Roberto Carcelen
