= Volleyball at the 2024 Bolivarian Youth Games =

Volleyball competitions at the 2024 Bolivarian Youth Games

- Volleyball pictogram
- Venue: Coliseo Jorge Revilla Aldana
- Location: Sucre, Bolivia
- Dates: 10–13 April 2024
- Competitors: 40 from 4 nations
- Teams: 4

Medalists
gold medal	Chile
silver medal	Peru
bronze medal	Bolivia

Volleyball competition at the 2024 Bolivarian Youth Games in Sucre, Bolivia was held from 10 to 13 April 2024 at Coliseo Jorge Revilla Aldana.

The girls' tournament was the only event scheduled to be contested. A total of 40 athletes (10 per team) competed in the event. Athletes had to be born between 1 January 2005 and 31 December 2008 to be eligible (ages 16 to 19).

Chile won the girls' tournament and claimed the only gold medal of the volleyball event.

== Participating nations ==
A total of 4 National Olympic Committees (NOCs) registered teams for the volleyball competition. Each NOC was able to enter a maximum of 10 volleyball players in their team squad.

Numbers in parentheses indicate the number of players entered the competition by each NOC.

- Bolivia (10)
- Chile (10)
- Peru (10)
- Venezuela (10)

== Medal summary ==
=== Medal table ===
* Host nation (Bolivia)

Rank	NOC	Gold	Silver	Bronze	Total
1	Chile (CHI)	1	0	0	1
2	Peru (PER)	0	1	0	1
3	Bolivia (BOL)*	0	0	1	1
Totals (3 entries)		1	1	1	3

Source: I Bolivarian Youth Games Sucre 2024 – Volleyball medals

=== Medalists ===
Event	Gold	Silver	Bronze
Girls' tournament	Chile; Francisca Vásquez; Francisca Valenzuela; Susana Bulnes; Dominga Aylwin; Kimberly Nieto; Martina Allende; Carla Barbano; Petra Schwartzman; Trinidad Trujillo; María Nielsen	Peru; Elizabeth Braithwaite; Mariana Chalco; Dafne Díaz; Waleska Toro; Carolina Oblea; Johani Tucto; Fabiana Hurtado; Alondra Villanueva; Alexandra García; Valentina Zeballos	Bolivia; Aishly Grass; Maryeli Ancalle; Belén Ferrufino; Emily Ayala; María Marca; Nicole Montaño; Adriana Jiménez; Jeisy Velásquez; Sandra López; Slim Mendizabal

== Girls' tournament ==
2024 Bolivarian Youth Games Girls' Volleyball tournament
Tournament details
- Host country: Bolivia
- City: Sucre
- Dates: 10–13 April 2024
- Teams: 4 (from 1 confederation)
- Venue: 1 (in 1 host city)

Final positions
- Champions: Chile (1st title)
- Runners-up: Peru
- Third place: Bolivia
- Fourth place: Venezuela

The girls' tournament consisted of a single group of 4 teams in which each team played once against the other 3 teams in the group on a single round-robin basis. The top two teams advanced to play the gold medal match, and the third and fourth placed teams played for the bronze medal.

The tournament was contested by U20 national teams.

Chile won the gold medal with a 3–0 win over Peru in the final. Hosts Bolivia defeated Venezuela 3–1 to win the bronze medal.

All match times are local times, BOT (UTC−4).

=== Preliminary stage ===
Pos	Team	Pld	W	L	Pts	SW	SL	SR	SPW	SPL	SPR	Qualification
1	Chile	3	3	0	6	9	0	MAX	225	163	1.380	Gold medal match
2	Peru	3	2	1	5	6	5	1.200	233	228	1.022	Gold medal match
3	Bolivia (H)	3	1	2	4	3	6	0.500	186	206	0.903	Bronze medal match
4	Venezuela	3	0	3	3	2	9	0.222	209	256	0.816	Bronze medal match

Source: COBOL Sucre 2024
(H) Host

10 April 2024; 18:00	Peru	0–3	Chile	Coliseo Jorge Revilla Aldana; Referees: Agustín Del Turco (ARG), Karina Gandarillas (BOL)
10 April 2024; 18:00	(14–25, 18–25, 20–25); Report			Coliseo Jorge Revilla Aldana; Referees: Agustín Del Turco (ARG), Karina Gandarillas (BOL)

10 April 2024; 20:00	Venezuela	0–3	Bolivia	Coliseo Cubierto Julio Monsalvo Castilla; Referees: Pedro Bianchini (BRA), Juan Pablo Flores (PER)
10 April 2024; 20:00	(17–25, 16–25, 23–25); Report			Coliseo Cubierto Julio Monsalvo Castilla; Referees: Pedro Bianchini (BRA), Juan Pablo Flores (PER)

11 April 2024; 18:00	Venezuela	0–3	Chile	Coliseo Jorge Revilla Aldana; Referees: Karina Gandarillas (BOL), Antonio Zurita (BOL)
11 April 2024; 18:00	(21–25, 20–25, 15–25); Report			Coliseo Jorge Revilla Aldana; Referees: Karina Gandarillas (BOL), Antonio Zurita (BOL)

11 April 2024; 20:00	Peru	3–0	Bolivia	Coliseo Cubierto Julio Monsalvo Castilla; Referees: Pedro Bianchini (BRA), Agustín Del Turco (ARG)
11 April 2024; 20:00	(25–22, 25–16, 25–18); Report			Coliseo Cubierto Julio Monsalvo Castilla; Referees: Pedro Bianchini (BRA), Agustín Del Turco (ARG)

12 April 2024; 18:00	Venezuela	2–3	Peru	Coliseo Jorge Revilla Aldana; Referees: Antonio Zurita (BOL), Agustín Del Turco (ARG)
12 April 2024; 18:00	(23–25, 15–25, 25–21, 25–20, 9–15); Report			Coliseo Jorge Revilla Aldana; Referees: Antonio Zurita (BOL), Agustín Del Turco (ARG)

12 April 2024; 21:00 (Note: Match started at 21:00 local time although it was originally scheduled for 20:00 local time.)	Chile	2–0	Bolivia	Coliseo Cubierto Julio Monsalvo Castilla; Referees: Juan Pablo Flores (PER), Pedro Bianchini (BRA)
12 April 2024; 21:00	(25–23, 25–16, 25–16); Report			Coliseo Cubierto Julio Monsalvo Castilla; Referees: Juan Pablo Flores (PER), Pedro Bianchini (BRA)

=== Bronze medal match ===
13 April 2024; 15:00	Bolivia	3–1	Venezuela	Coliseo Jorge Revilla Aldana; Referees: Pedro Bianchini (BRA), Juan Pablo Flores (PER)
13 April 2024; 15:00	(25–21, 25–21, 18–25, 25–16); Report			Coliseo Jorge Revilla Aldana; Referees: Pedro Bianchini (BRA), Juan Pablo Flores (PER)

=== Gold medal match ===
13 April 2024; 17:30 (Note: Match started at 17:30 local time although it was originally scheduled for 17:00 local time.)	Chile	3–0	Peru	Coliseo Jorge Revilla Aldana; Referees: Agustín Del Turco (ARG), Karina Gandarillas (BOL)
13 April 2024; 17:30	(25–12, 25–13, 25–15); Report			Coliseo Jorge Revilla Aldana; Referees: Agustín Del Turco (ARG), Karina Gandarillas (BOL)
