= Ornella Oettl Reyes =

German-Peruvian alpine skier

Personal information
- Born: 14 December 1991 (age 34) Germany

Skiing career
- Sport: Alpine skiing
- Disciplines: Slalom; Giant Slalom

Olympics
- Teams: 3 – (2010, 2014, 2022)

World Championships
- Teams: 6 – (2011–2021)

Ornella Oettl Reyes (born 14 December 1991) is a German-Peruvian alpine skier who was part of the first Peruvian delegation to the Winter Olympics. She specializes in slalom and giant slalom and has competed in six World Championships and two Winter Olympics.

== Career ==
Born in Munich, Germany to a German father and a Peruvian mother, Oettl Reyes carries both citizenships.

Her first International Ski Federation (FIS) competition was the 2006 German National Junior Race, where she was disqualified in the first slalom run and did not finish the second giant slalom run. As of February 2022, her best finish in any competition was second place at a 2008 giant slalom event in Germany.

Since June 2009, Oettl Reyes has been representing Peru in the FIS, having previously been registered as German. At the age of 18, she made her Olympic debut at the 2010 Olympics in Canada, as part of the first-ever Peruvian delegation to the Winter Olympics. A year later, she participated in her first World Championship.

Oettl Reyes has participated in every World Championship since 2011, with varying success. In the 2021 World Championship, she placed 36th in slalom, her best-ever placement in the competition as of 2022.

== Results ==
World Championship
Year
Year	Age	Slalom	Giant; Slalom	Super-G	Downhill	Combined
2011	19	DSQ1	70	—	—	—
2013	21	65	DSQ1	—	—	—
2015	23	DNF1	71	—	—	—
2017	25	DNF1	68	—	—	—
2019	27	DNF1	75	—	—	—
2021	29	36	DNF1	—	—	—

Olympic Winter Games
Year
Year	Age	Slalom	Giant; Slalom	Super-G	Downhill	Combined
2010	18	DNF2	DNF2	—	—	—
2014	22	DNF1	57	—	—	—
2018	26	did not compete				

== Personal life ==
Oettl Reyes has two siblings. Her younger brother Manfred is also an alpine skier.

Olympic Games
Preceded by Lucca Mesinas; Daniella Rosas	Flag bearer for Peru; Beijing 2022	Succeeded by María Luisa Doig; Juan Postigos
