= Öttl =

Öttl is a surname. Notable people with the surname include:

- Peter Öttl (born 1965), German motorcycle road racer
- Philipp Öttl (born 1996), German motorcycle racer, son of Peter
