= Francisco Boza =

Peruvian sport shooter (born 1964)

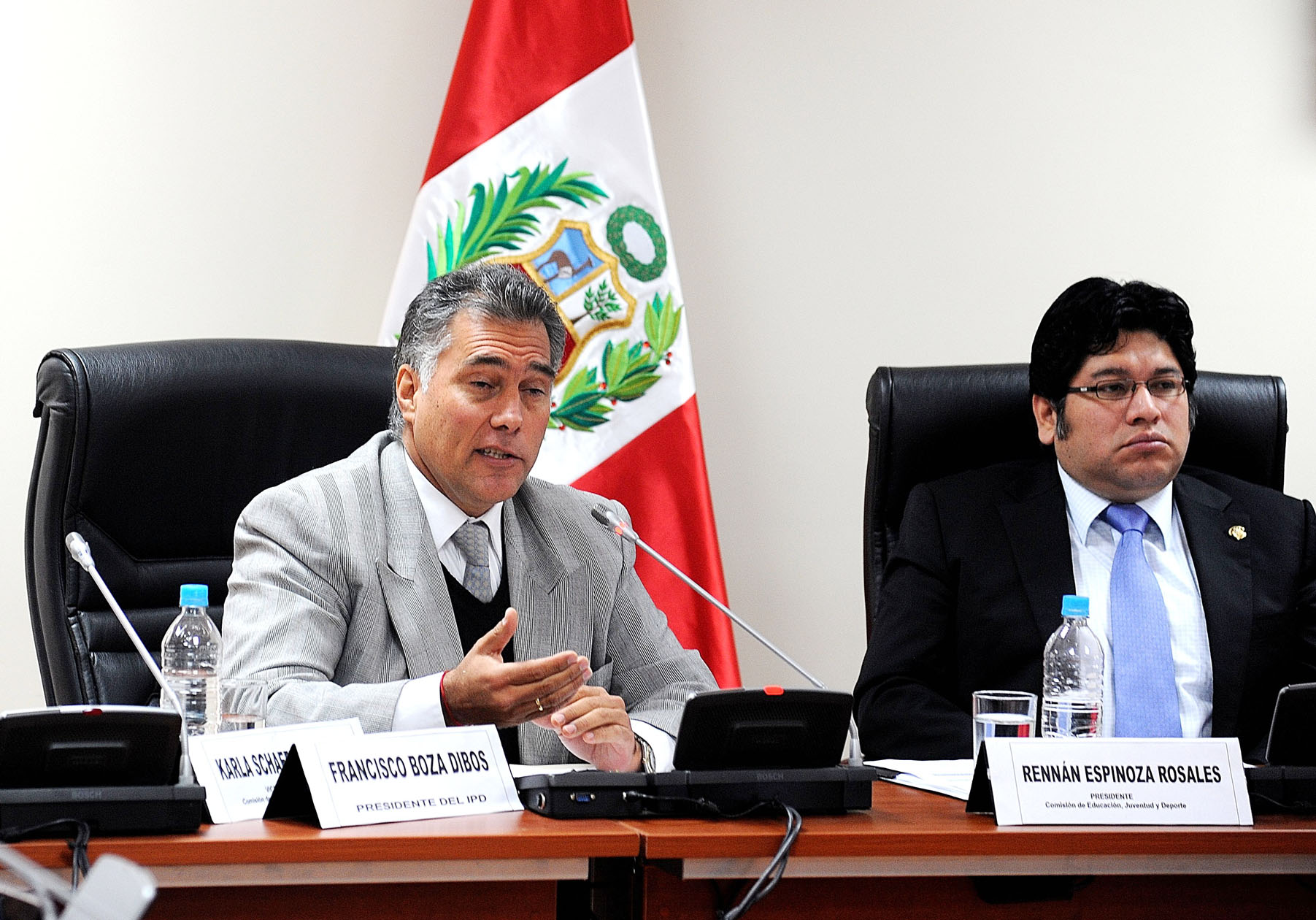

Personal information
- Nationality: Peruvian
- Born: 19 September 1964 (age 61) Perù

Sport
- Sport: Shooting
- Start activity: 1980
Medal record
Men's sport shooting
Representing Peru
Olympic Games
| Silver medal – second place | 1984 Los Angeles | Trap |
Pan American Games
| Gold medal – first place | 2015 Toronto | Trap |

Francisco Boza (born 19 September 1964) is a Peruvian sport shooter and Olympic medalist. He won a silver medal in trap shooting at the 1984 Summer Olympics in Los Angeles and came fourth four years later.

== Biography ==
He has competed in eight Olympic Games, from 1980 to 2016, one of only five shooters ever to do so. As of 2010, no other Peruvian had appeared at even six Olympics. Boza qualified for the 2016 Summer Olympics and was the Peruvian flag bearer. He finished in 28th place in the qualifying round of the men's trap shooting competition and did not advance to the semifinals. Boza was also flag bearer at the 2004 Summer Olympics.

His brother is Esteban Boza, also an Olympic shooter.

== See also ==
- List of athletes with the most appearances at Olympic Games
- Multi-participation men in shooting at the Olympic Games

Olympic Games
| Preceded by Rosa García | Flagbearer for Peru; Athens 2004 | Succeeded by Sixto Barrera |
| Preceded by Roberto Carcelen | Flagbearer for Peru; Rio de Janeiro 2016 | Succeeded by Lucca Mesinas / Daniella Rosas |
