= Roberto Carcelen =

Peruvian-American cross-country skier

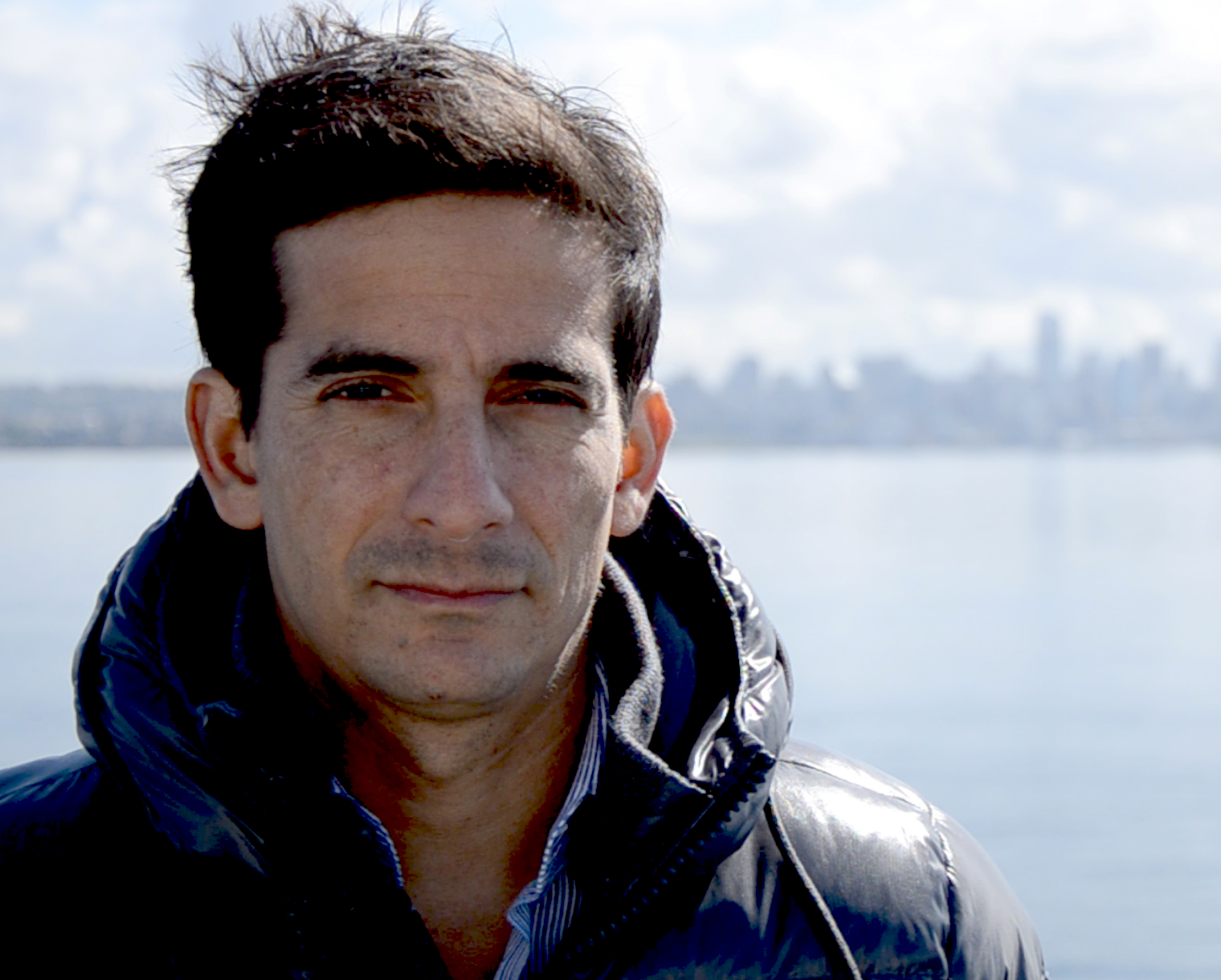

Personal information
- Nationality: Peru
- Born: September 8, 1970 (age 55) Lima, Peru

Sport
- Sport: Skiing

Roberto Carcelen (born September 8, 1970), is a Peruvian-American cross-country skier, who competed at the 2010 and 2014 Winter Olympics for Peru. He was the first Peruvian person ever to compete at the Winter Olympics. He had learned the sport from his American wife.

At the 2010 Olympics, he competed in the 15 kilometre freestyle race, and placed 94th out of 95.

Carcelen qualified again in 2013 for the 2014 Winter Olympics in Sochi, Russia. He competed in the 15 kilometre classical race, although he broke a rib during training, and finished last out of 87 competitors who finished the race.

Carcelen is the founder and executive director of The Roberto Carcelen Foundation.

Olympic Games
Preceded by Sixto Barrera	Flag bearer for Peru; Vancouver 2010	Succeeded by Gladys Tejeda
Preceded by Gladys Tejeda	Flag bearer for Peru; Sochi 2014	Succeeded by Francisco Boza
