= Manfred Oettl Reyes =

Peruvian alpine skier

Personal information
- Nationality: Peruvian
- Born: October 23, 1993 (age 32) Germany

Achievements and titles
- Olympic finals: 2010 Winter Olympics

Manfred Oettl Reyes (born October 23, 1993, in Germany) is an alpine skier who has represented Peru since 2010. Competing in various alpine skiing events, including slalom, giant slalom, downhill, and super combined, he has participated in numerous junior international competitions since 2009. As of February 2010, his best performance was a 32nd-place finish in a downhill event in Italy. He is a member of the Asociación Peruana de Ski.

== Early life and background ==
Oettl Reyes was born in Germany to a Peruvian mother. At the age of 16, he was selected as one of three members of Peru's delegation to the 2010 Winter Olympics in Vancouver, British Columbia, Canada. This marked the first time Peru participated in the Winter Olympics. His older sister, Ornella Oettl Reyes, also an alpine skier, was part of the team.

== 2010 Winter Olympics ==
At the 2010 Winter Olympics, Manfred Oettl Reyes was scheduled to compete in both the slalom and giant slalom events. Although he was not considered a serious contender for a medal, his participation garnered attention and some controversy. Critics questioned his representation of Peru, since he was born and resides in Germany and is only half-Peruvian. Both he and his sister were last-minute additions to the Olympic roster, having met the minimum time qualifications for participation. However, they had not participated in a World Championship before the Olympics, which led to further scrutiny.

== Controversy and response ==
The Peruvian Olympic Committee explained that the siblings were in the process of obtaining their Peruvian passports when the last World Championships occurred, preventing them from competing on behalf of Peru. This explanation was provided in response to criticism regarding their eligibility. The controversy also sparked discussions about the Peruvian government's efforts to identify and develop athletes within the country. Despite these issues, the practice of smaller countries sending athletes who are technically citizens but reside elsewhere is not uncommon. The Oettl Reyes siblings asked for support from Peruvians and sought to be embraced for their participation in the Olympics.
