= Peruvian Olympic Committee =

National Olympic Committee

- Country: Peru
- [[|]]
- Code: PER
- Created: 1924
- Recognized: 1936
- Continental Association: PASO
- Headquarters: Lima, Peru
- President: Renzo Manyari Velazco
- Secretary General: Carlos Manuel Lazarte Labarthe
- Website: www.coperu.org

The Peruvian Olympic Committee (Spanish: Comité Olímpico Peruano, COP) (IOC Code: PER) is the National Olympic Committee representing Peruvian athletes in the Olympic Games, the Pan American Games and the Central American and Caribbean Games. By the IOC was created 1924 and recognized in 1936.

The Peruvian Olympic Committee is headquartered in Lima, Peru.

== Presidents ==
The following is a list of COP presidents starting in 1924.

№	Name	Term
1	Alfredo García Godos	1924–1926
2	Leónidas Gonzales	1926–1928
3	Héctor Menacho	1928
4	Alfredo Larrañaga	1929–1930
5	Jorge Souza	1930–1932
6	Eduardo Dibós Dammert	1933–1941
7	Miguel Dasso	1941–1946
8	Alejandro Carrillo Rocha	1946–1947
9	Ernesto Rodríguez	1948
10	Alejandro Villalobos	1948
11	Leopoldo Molinari	1949–1951
12	Juan Sedó	1951–1952
13	Carlos Miano	1953–1955
14	Miguel Dasso	1955
15	Eduardo Astengo	1955–1956
16	Luis Marrou Correa	1956–1962
17	Alfredo Hohagen Diez Canseco	1962–1964
18	Guillermo Griffiths Escardó	1965
19	Víctor Nagaro Bianchi	1966–1968
20	Javier Aramburu Menchaca	1969–1972
21	Eduardo Guinea Fernández	1973–1976
22	Guillermo Griffiths Escardó	1976–1980
23	Eduardo Guinea Fernández	1981–1985
24	Raúl Gamboa Aboado	1985–1989
25	Raúl Gamboa Aboado	1989
26	Luis E. Woolcott Atard	1989–1993
27	Luis E. Woolcott Atard	1993–1997
28	Mario Suito Sueyras	1997–2001
29	Carlos Paz Soldán Haider	2001–2005
30	Carlos Paz Soldán Haider	2005–2009
31	José Carlos Quiñones González	2009–2013
32	José Carlos Quiñones González	2013–2017
33	Pedro Del Rosario Delgado	2017–2021
34	Renzo Vitto Fabrizio Manyari Velazco	2021–2025

== See also ==
- Peru at the Olympics
- Peru at the Paralympics
- Peru at the Pan American Games
